= 2022–23 Montpellier HSC season =

Montpellier HSC
2022–23 season
- President: Laurent Nicollin
- Head coach: Olivier Dall'Oglio (until 17 October); Romain Pitau (caretaker, from 17 October to 7 February); Michel Der Zakarian (from 8 February)
- Stadium: Stade de la Mosson
- Ligue 1: 12th
- Coupe de France: Round of 64
- Top goalscorer: League: Elye Wahi (19); All: Elye Wahi (19)
- Biggest win: Brest 0–7 Montpellier
- Biggest defeat: Nice 6–1 Montpellier
| Home colours | Away colours | Third colours |

The 2022–23 season was the 104th season in the history of Montpellier HSC and their 14th consecutive season in the top flight. The club participated in Ligue 1 and the Coupe de France.

== Players ==
=== First-team squad ===
As of 31 January 2023

Note: Flags indicate national team as defined under FIFA eligibility rules; some limited exceptions apply. Players may hold more than one non-FIFA nationality.

| No. | Pos. | Nation | Player |
|---|---|---|---|
| 3 | DF | GUI | Issiaga Sylla |
| 4 | DF | MLI | Boubakar Kouyaté |
| 5 | DF | POR | Pedro Mendes |
| 6 | DF | FRA | Christopher Jullien |
| 7 | FW | FRA | Arnaud Nordin |
| 9 | FW | FRA | Valère Germain |
| 10 | FW | ENG | Stephy Mavididi |
| 11 | MF | FRA | Téji Savanier (captain) |
| 12 | MF | FRA | Jordan Ferri (vice-captain) |
| 13 | MF | FRA | Joris Chotard |
| 14 | DF | FRA | Maxime Estève |
| 15 | DF | URU | Mathías Suárez |
| 16 | GK | FRA | Dimitry Bertaud |
| 17 | DF | FRA | Théo Sainte-Luce |
| 18 | MF | FRA | Léo Leroy |

| No. | Pos. | Nation | Player |
|---|---|---|---|
| 20 | FW | ALG | Yanis Guermouche |
| 21 | FW | FRA | Elye Wahi |
| 22 | MF | FRA | Khalil Fayad |
| 26 | DF | FRA | Thibault Tamas |
| 27 | DF | FRA | Faitout Maouassa (on loan from Club Brugge) |
| 28 | FW | CGO | Béni Makouana |
| 29 | DF | CMR | Enzo Tchato |
| 30 | GK | FRA | Matis Carvalho |
| 35 | DF | FRA | Lucas Mincarelli |
| 40 | GK | FRA | Benjamin Lecomte |
| 75 | DF | FRA | Mamadou Sakho |
| 77 | DF | MLI | Falaye Sacko (on loan from Vitória de Guimarães) |
| 90 | GK | SEN | Bingourou Kamara |
| 99 | FW | TUN | Wahbi Khazri |

=== Out on loan ===
Note: Flags indicate national team as defined under FIFA eligibility rules; some limited exceptions apply. Players may hold more than one non-FIFA nationality.

| No. / Pos. / Nation / Player; — / MF / SUI / Gabriel Barès (at Thun until 30 June 2023) | No. / Pos. / Nation / Player; — / MF / FRA / Sacha Delaye (at Le Puy until 30 June 2023) |

== Transfers ==
=== In ===
| No. | Pos. | Player | Transferred from | Fee | Date | Source |
|---|---|---|---|---|---|---|
| 27 | DF | (France) Faitout Maouassa | (Belgium) Club Brugge | Loan | 21 June 2022 | |
| 7 | FW | (France) Arnaud Nordin | (France) Saint-Étienne | Free | 1 July 2022 | |
| 17 | DF | (France) Théo Sainte-Luce | (France) Nîmes | Free | 1 July 2022 | |
| 77 | DF | (Mali) Falaye Sacko | (Portugal) Vitória de Guimarães | Loan | 1 July 2022 | |
| 99 | FW | (Tunisia) Wahbi Khazri | (France) Saint-Étienne | Free | 1 July 2022 | |
| 6 | DF | (France) Christopher Jullien | (Scotland) Celtic | €1 million | 23 August 2022 | |
| 90 | GK | (Senegal) Bingourou Kamara | (France) Strasbourg | Free | 1 September 2022 | |
| 4 | DF | (Mali) Boubakar Kouyaté | (France) Metz | €6 million | 20 January 2023 | |
| 40 | GK | (France) Benjamin Lecomte | (France) Monaco | €3 million | 26 January 2023 | |
| 3 | DF | (Guinea) Issiaga Sylla | (France) Toulouse | Free | 31 January 2023 | |

=== Out ===
| Pos. | Player | Transferred to | Fee | Date | Source |
|---|---|---|---|---|---|
| DF | (Brazil) Matheus Thuler | (Brazil) Flamengo | Loan return | 1 July 2022 | |
| FW | (United States) Nicholas Gioacchini | (France) Caen | Loan return | 1 July 2022 | |
| DF | (France) Clément Vidal | (France) Ajaccio | Undisclosed | 1 July 2022 | |
| MF | (France) Florent Mollet | (Germany) Schalke 04 | €700,000 (Note: Up to €800,000 in bonuses) | 1 July 2022 | |
| DF | (Serbia) Mihailo Ristić | (Portugal) Benfica | Free | 1 July 2022 | |
| DF | (Cameroon) Ambroise Oyongo | Released | Free | 1 July 2022 | |
| DF | (France) Junior Sambia | Released (Note: On 19 July 2022, Sambia signed for Salernitana.) | Free | 1 July 2022 | |
| MF | (France) Rémy Cabella | Released (Note: On 10 July 2022, Cabella signed for Lille.) | Free | 1 July 2022 | |
| FW | (Algeria) Yanis Guermouche | (France) Châteauroux | Loan | 18 July 2022 | |
| MF | (Switzerland) Gabriel Barès | (Switzerland) Thun | Loan | 27 July 2022 | |
| DF | (France) Arnaud Souquet | (United States) Chicago Fire | Free | 9 January 2023 | |
| MF | (France) Sacha Delaye | (France) Le Puy | Loan | 10 January 2023 | |
| GK | (Switzerland) Jonas Omlin | (Germany) Borussia Mönchengladbach | €8 million | 19 January 2023 | |
| DF | (France) Nicolas Cozza | (Germany) VfL Wolfsburg | €500,000 | 26 January 2023 | |

== Pre-season and friendlies ==
Win Draw Loss Fixtures

| 9 July 2022 Friendly | Montpellier | 0–1 | Rodez | Montpellier |
| 19:00 CEST (UTC+2) | | Report | | Stadium: Stade Bernard Gasset Terrain n°2 |

| 16 July 2022 Friendly | Espanyol | 2–0 | Montpellier | Sant Adrià de Besòs, Spain |
| 18:30 CEST (UTC+2) | Melamed 44'; Vinícius (yellow card) 63'; Villahermosa 83' | Report | Mendes (yellow card) 15'; Chotard (yellow card) 42'; Khazri (yellow card) 63'; Ferri (red card) 87' | Stadium: Ciutat Esportiva Dani Jarque |

| 20 July 2022 Friendly | Montpellier | 0–2 | Clermont | Millau |
| 19:00 CEST (UTC+2) | Sakho (yellow card) 42' | Report | Andrić 17', 38', (yellow card) 42'; Kyei (yellow card) 75' | Stadium: Terrain Alex Katona |

| 23 July 2022 Friendly | Montpellier | 4–5 | Toulouse | Agde |
| 19:00 CEST (UTC+2) | Wahi 36' (pen.); Khazri 44'; Nordin 45'; Mavididi 62' (pen.) | Report | Dallinga 10'; Ratão 19'; Ngoumou 30'; Nicolaisen 53'; Diarra 83' | Stadium: Stade Louis Sanguin; Attendance: 1,000; Referee: Gaël Angoula |
Note: Match was played in three 45-minute periods.

| 30 July 2022 Friendly | Crystal Palace | 4–2 | Montpellier | London, England |
| 15:00 BST (UTC+1) | Zaha 23'; Édouard 32', 44'; Guéhi 49' | Report | Mavididi 65', 82' | Stadium: Selhurst Park |

| 10 December 2022 Friendly | Montpellier | 1–2 | Lens | San Pedro de Alcántara, Spain |
| 16:00 CET (UTC+1) | | | | Stadium: Marbella Football Center - Sur 2 |

| 16 December 2022 Friendly | Montpellier | 5–0 | Rodez | Montpellier |
| 16:00 CET (UTC+1) | Nordin 10'; Savanier 23'; Mavididi 34'; Germain 67'; Souquet 73' | | | Stadium: Stade Bernard Gasset Terrain n°2 |

| 20 December 2022 Friendly | Montpellier | 2–1 | Toulouse | Montpellier |
| 16:15 CET (UTC+1) | Sakho 110'; Germain 117' | | Van den Boomen 89' | Attendance: 0 |
Note: Match was played in three 45-minute periods

== Competitions ==
=== Overall record ===
| Competition | First match | Last match | Starting round | Final position | Record | | | | | | | |
| Competition | First match | Last match | Starting round | Final position | Pld | W | D | L | GF | GA | GD | Win % |
|---|---|---|---|---|---|---|---|---|---|---|---|---|
| Ligue 1 | 7 August 2022 | 3 June 2023 | Matchday 1 | 12th | 38 | 15 | 5 | 18 | 65 | 62 | +3 | 39.47 |
| Coupe de France | 6 January 2023 | | Round of 64 | Round of 64 | 1 | 0 | 0 | 1 | 1 | 2 | −1 | 0.00 |
| Total | | | | | 39 | 15 | 5 | 19 | 66 | 64 | +2 | 38.46 |

Source: Soccerway

=== Ligue 1 ===
==== League table ====
| Pos | Team | Pld | W | D | L | GF | GA | GD | Pts | Qualification or relegation |
|---|---|---|---|---|---|---|---|---|---|---|
| 10 | Lorient | 38 | 15 | 10 | 13 | 52 | 53 | −1 | 55 | |
| 11 | Reims | 38 | 12 | 15 | 11 | 45 | 45 | 0 | 51 | |
| 12 | Montpellier | 38 | 15 | 5 | 18 | 65 | 62 | +3 | 50 | |
| 13 | Toulouse | 38 | 13 | 9 | 16 | 51 | 57 | −6 | 48 | Qualification for the Europa League group stage (Note: Toulouse qualified for the Europa League group stage as the 2022–23 Coupe de France winners.) |
| 14 | Brest | 38 | 11 | 11 | 16 | 44 | 54 | −10 | 44 | |

Source: Ligue 1
Rules for classification: 1) Points; 2) Goal difference; 3) Head-to-head points; 4) Head-to-head goal difference; 5) Head-to-head goals scored; 6) Head-to-head away goals scored; 7) Goals scored; 8) Away goals scored; 9) Fair-play points (Note: Head-to-head record is used only after all the matches between the teams in question have been played).

==== Results summary ====
| Overall | | | | | | | | Home | | | | | | Away | | | | | |
| Pld | W | D | L | GF | GA | GD | Pts | W | D | L | GF | GA | GD | W | D | L | GF | GA | GD |
|---|---|---|---|---|---|---|---|---|---|---|---|---|---|---|---|---|---|---|---|
| 38 | 15 | 5 | 18 | 65 | 62 | +3 | 50 | 7 | 3 | 9 | 29 | 29 | 0 | 8 | 2 | 9 | 36 | 33 | +3 |

Source: Ligue 1

==== Results by round ====
| Round | 1 | 2 | 3 | 4 | 5 | 6 | 7 | 8 | 9 | 10 | 11 | 12 | 13 | 14 | 15 | 16 | 17 | 18 | 19 | 20 | 21 | 22 | 23 | 24 | 25 | 26 | 27 | 28 | 29 | 30 | 31 | 32 | 33 | 34 | 35 | 36 | 37 | 38 |
|---|---|---|---|---|---|---|---|---|---|---|---|---|---|---|---|---|---|---|---|---|---|---|---|---|---|---|---|---|---|---|---|---|---|---|---|---|---|---|
| Ground | H | A | H | A | H | H | A | H | A | H | A | H | A | A | H | A | H | A | H | A | H | A | H | A | H | H | A | H | A | H | A | H | A | A | H | A | H | A |
| Result | W | L | L | W | W | L | L | W | L | L | L | L | L | D | D | W | L | L | L | W | L | L | W | W | D | W | W | W | D | L | L | W | W | L | D | W | L | W |
| Position | 4 | 9 | 13 | 8 | 5 | 7 | 10 | 9 | 10 | 10 | 11 | 13 | 14 | 14 | 14 | 12 | 14 | 15 | 15 | 14 | 14 | 14 | 14 | 14 | 14 | 13 | 13 | 11 | 11 | 13 | 13 | 12 | 12 | 12 | 12 | 12 | 12 | 12 |

Source: Ligue 1
A = Away; H = Home; W = Win; D = Draw; L = Loss

==== Matches ====
The league fixtures were announced on 17 June 2022.

| 7 August 2022 1 | Montpellier | 3–2 | Troyes | Montpellier |
| 15:00 CEST (UTC+2) | Sainte-Luce 3'; Savanier 15', 81'; Makouana (yellow card) 52' | Report | Tardieu 12' (pen.); M. Baldé 17' | Stadium: Stade de la Mosson; Attendance: 12,003; Referee: Pierre Gaillouste |

| 13 August 2022 2 | Paris Saint-Germain | 5–2 | Montpellier | Paris |
| 21:00 CEST (UTC+2) | Mbappé (penalty missed) 23', 69'; Sacko 39' (o.g.); Neymar 43' (pen.), 51'; Kimpembe (yellow card) 60'; Vitinha (yellow card) 66'; Sanches 87' | Report | Khazri 58'; Wahi (yellow card) 63'; Tchato 90+2' | Stadium: Parc des Princes; Attendance: 46,000; Referee: Willy Delajod |

| 21 August 2022 3 | Montpellier | 1–2 | Auxerre | Montpellier |
| 15:00 CEST (UTC+2) | Sakho 39', (yellow card) 73'; Fayad (red card) 46'; Savanier (red card) 90+4' | Report | Da Costa (yellow card) 5' (yellow-red card) 88', (goal) 70'; Joly (yellow card) 43'; Niang (red card) 51'; Autret 75' (pen.) | Stadium: Stade de la Mosson; Attendance: 13,137; Referee: Mathieu Vernice |

| 28 August 2022 4 | Brest | 0–7 | Montpellier | Brest |
| 15:00 CEST (UTC+2) | Lees-Melou (red card) 50' | Report | Maouassa 6'; Wahi 10', 31'; Khazri 11'; Cozza 25'; Nordin (yellow card) 62'; Germain 64', 84'; Leroy (yellow card) 71' | Stadium: Stade Francis-Le Blé; Attendance: 11,546; Referee: Marc Bollengier |

| 31 August 2022 5 | Montpellier | 2–0 | Ajaccio | Montpellier |
| 19:00 CEST (UTC+2) | Nordin 28'; Ferri (yellow card) 42'; Omlin (red card) 45'; Sacko (yellow card) 52'; Wahi 77' | Report | Hamouma (yellow card) 20' (yellow-red card) 37'; Gonzalez (yellow card) 72'; Spadanuda (yellow card) 75' | Stadium: Stade de la Mosson; Attendance: 10,051; Referee: Bastien Dechepy |

| 4 September 2022 6 | Montpellier | 1–3 | Lille | Montpellier |
| 13:00 CEST (UTC+2) | Wahi 20'; Germain (red card) 45+3' | Report | Djaló (yellow card) 16'; David 41', 90+5', (yellow card) 90+4'; Ang. Gomes 57'; Ounas (yellow card) 80'; And. Gomes (yellow card) 86' | Stadium: Stade de la Mosson; Attendance: 12,215; Referee: Jérôme Brisard |

| 11 September 2022 7 | Angers | 2–1 | Montpellier | Angers |
| 15:00 CEST (UTC+2) | Hunou 10'; Boufal 69' (pen.); Mendy (yellow card) 80'; Bamba (yellow card) 90+4' | Report | Nordin 7'; Kamara (yellow card) 66'; Leroy (yellow card) 83'; Ferri (yellow card) 90+2'; Khazri (yellow card) 90+3' | Stadium: Stade Raymond Kopa; Attendance: 6,165; Referee: François Letexier |

| 17 September 2022 8 | Montpellier | 2–1 | Strasbourg | Montpellier |
| 17:00 CEST (UTC+2) | Nordin 17', (yellow card) 41'; Chotard (yellow card) 30'; Estève (yellow card) 64'; Cozza (yellow card) 90+4'; Savanier 90+5' (pen.) | Report | Aholou (yellow card) 20'; Bellegarde (yellow card) 45+5'; Doukouré (yellow card) 69'; Diallo 85'; Djiku (yellow card) 90+4' | Stadium: Stade de la Mosson; Attendance: 10,780; Referee: Jérémy Stinat |

| 2 October 2022 9 | Toulouse | 4–2 | Montpellier | Toulouse |
| 15:00 CEST (UTC+2) | Desler (yellow card) 15' (yellow-red card) 60'; Spierings 18', (yellow card) 60'; Aboukhlal 24'; Chaïbi 31'; Sylla (yellow card) 43'; Dejaegere 48'; Genreau (yellow card) 73' | Report | Cozza 7'; Ferri (yellow card) 16'; Chotard (yellow card) 33'; Savanier (yellow card) 53'; Wahi (yellow card) 67', (goal) 68' | Stadium: Stadium de Toulouse; Attendance: 21,820; Referee: Jérémie Pignard |

| 9 October 2022 10 | Montpellier | 0–2 | Monaco | Montpellier |
| 13:00 CEST (UTC+2) | Estève (yellow card) 10'; Jullien (yellow card) 88' | Report | Caio Henrique (yellow card) 26'; Embolo 45+1'; Badiashile (yellow card) 65'; Camara (yellow card) 71'; Boadu 80' | Stadium: Stade de la Mosson; Attendance: 13,048; Referee: Benoît Millot |

| 15 October 2022 11 | Lens | 1–0 | Montpellier | Lens |
| 21:00 CEST (UTC+2) | Medina (yellow card) 19'; Saïd 67'; Machado (yellow card) 65' | Report | Wahi (yellow card) 19'; Estève (yellow card) 31' | Stadium: Stade Bollaert-Delelis; Attendance: 37,320; Referee: Hakim Ben El Hadj |

| 22 October 2022 12 | Montpellier | 1–2 | Lyon | Montpellier |
| 17:00 CEST (UTC+2) | Savanier (yellow card) 59'; Wahi 70', (yellow card) 74'; Mavididi (red card) 74' | Report | Aouar (yellow card) 7', (goal) 33'; Mendes (yellow card) 49'; Diomande (red card) 74'; Lacazette 90' | Stadium: Stade de la Mosson; Attendance: 15,339; Referee: Thomas Léonard |

| 30 October 2022 13 | Rennes | 3–0 | Montpellier | Rennes |
| 15:00 CET (UTC+1) | Terrier 15'; Kalimuendo 23'; Majer (yellow card) 84'; Gouiri 85' | Report | Cozza (yellow card) 23'; Chotard (yellow card) 72' | Stadium: Roazhon Park; Attendance: 25,617; Referee: Bastien Dechepy |

| 6 November 2022 14 | Clermont | 1–1 | Montpellier | Clermont-Ferrand |
| 15:00 CEST (UTC+2) | Ogier (yellow card) 42'; Andrić (penalty missed) 41', 62'; Kyei (penalty missed) 78' | Report | Savanier 10' (pen.); Cozza (yellow card) 34'; Khazri (yellow card) 81' | Stadium: Stade Gabriel Montpied; Attendance: 10,990; Referee: Marc Bollengier |

| 13 November 2022 15 | Montpellier | 1–1 | Reims | Montpellier |
| 15:00 CET (UTC+1) | Souquet (yellow card) 27'; Leroy (yellow card) 40'; Delaye 90+1' | Report | Diouf (yellow card) 24'; Cajuste (yellow card) 72'; Munetsi 87' | Stadium: Stade Auguste-Delaune; Attendance: 11,778; Referee: Florent Batta |

| 28 December 2022 16 | Lorient | 0–2 | Montpellier | Lorient |
| 17:00 CET (UTC+1) | Le Fée (yellow card) 7'; Kalulu (yellow card) 50'; Innocent (yellow card) 59' | Report | Savanier 3', (yellow card) 90'; Wahi 22'; Leroy (yellow card) 28'; Sacko (yellow card) 43'; Omlin (yellow card) 58' | Stadium: Stade du Moustoir; Attendance: 15,963; Referee: Willy Delajod |

| 2 January 2023 17 | Montpellier | 1–2 | Marseille | Montpellier |
| 19:00 CET (UTC+1) | Ferri (yellow card) 51'; Jullien (yellow card) 85'; Savanier 90+1' (pen.) | Report | Mbemba (yellow card) 6'; Tavares 46', (red card) 86'; Estève 60' (o.g.); López (yellow card) 89' | Stadium: Stade de la Mosson; Attendance: 18,971; Referee: Ruddy Buquet |

| 11 January 2023 18 | Nice | 6–1 | Montpellier | Nice |
| 21:00 CET (UTC+1) | Pépé 15', 56', (yellow card) 63'; Thuram 35'; Delort 75'; Barkley 82', 85' | Report | Khazri (yellow card) 63'; Savanier 80' | Stadium: Allianz Riviera; Attendance: 17,500; Referee: Bastien Dechepy |

| 15 January 2023 19 | Montpellier | 0–3 | Nantes | Montpellier |
| 15:00 CET (UTC+1) | Khazri (red card) 42'; Wahi (yellow card) 67' (yellow-red card) 67' | Report | Guessand (yellow card) 45+11'; Girotto 45+13'; Simon (yellow card) 69'; Mohamed 81'; Blas 84' | Stadium: Stade de la Mosson; Attendance: 10,947; Referee: Thomas Léonard |

| 29 January 2023 20 | Auxerre | 0–2 | Montpellier | Auxerre |
| 15:00 CET (UTC+1) | Mensah (yellow card) 54'; Touré (penalty missed) 90+4' | Report | Tchato (yellow card) 40'; Leroy (yellow card) 60'; Mavididi 62', 80', (yellow card) 67' | Stadium: Stade de l'Abbé-Deschamps; Attendance: 14,206; Referee: Jérémy Stinat |

| 1 February 2023 21 | Montpellier | 1–3 | Paris Saint-Germain | Montpellier |
| 21:00 CET (UTC+1) | Jullien (yellow card) 7'; Nordin 89' | Report | Mbappé (penalty missed) 10'; Pereira (yellow card) 11'; Fabián 54'; Messi 71'; Zaïre-Emery 90+1' | Stadium: Stade de la Mosson; Attendance: 17,454; Referee: Jérémie Pignard |

| 5 February 2023 22 | Strasbourg | 2–0 | Montpellier | Strasbourg |
| 15:00 CET (UTC+1) | Diallo 1', 45', (yellow card) 75'; Aholou (red card) 33'; Liénard (yellow card) 37' | Report | Fayad (yellow card) 37'; Sels (yellow card) 84' | Stadium: Stade de la Meinau; Attendance: 25,028; Referee: Stéphanie Frappart |

| 12 February 2023 23 | Montpellier | 3–0 | Brest | Montpellier |
| 15:00 CET (UTC+1) | Hérelle 4' (o.g.); Savanier 17' (pen.); Leroy (yellow card) 45+4'; Wahi 54' | Report | Lemaréchal (yellow card) 74'; Lala (yellow card) 80' | Stadium: Stade de la Mosson; Attendance: 12,901; Referee: Florent Batta |

| 19 February 2023 24 | Troyes | 0–1 | Montpellier | Troyes |
| 15:00 CET (UTC+1) | Agoumé (yellow card) 8'; Yade (red card) 67'; Chavalerin (yellow card) 81' | Report | Chotard (yellow card) 57'; Savanier (red card) 73'; Khazri 90' | Stadium: Stade de l'Aube; Attendance: 7,745; Referee: Benoît Bastien |

| 25 February 2023 25 | Montpellier | 1–1 | Lens | Montpellier |
| 21:00 CET (UTC+1) | Maouassa 59' | Report | Fulgini 4'; Danso (yellow card) 20'; Sotoca (yellow card) 23'; Costa (yellow card) 85' | Stadium: Stade de la Mosson; Attendance: 17,074; Referee: Jérôme Brisard |

| 5 March 2023 26 | Montpellier | 5–0 | Angers | Montpellier |
| 15:00 CET (UTC+1) | Khazri 2'; Kouyaté (yellow card) 8'; Savanier 25' (pen.), 51'; Maouassa 45+3'; Wahi 73' | Report | Camara (yellow card) 33'; Bentaleb (yellow card) 57' (yellow-red card) 57'; Blažič (yellow card) 82' | Stadium: Stade de la Mosson; Attendance: 11,664; Referee: Benoît Millot |

| 12 March 2023 27 | Ajaccio | 0–1 | Montpellier | Ajaccio |
| 15:00 CET (UTC+1) | Youssouf (yellow card) 5'; Gonzalez (yellow card) 90+3' | Report | Nordin (yellow card) 32'; Savanier (yellow card) 59'; Wahi 68' | Stadium: Stade François Coty; Attendance: 13,889; Referee: Hakim Ben El Hadj |

| 19 March 2023 28 | Montpellier | 2–1 | Clermont | Montpellier |
| 15:00 CET (UTC+1) | Wahi 60', 71'; Khazri (yellow card) 85'; Ferri (yellow card) 90' (yellow-red card) 90+1' | Report | Khaoui 31'; Gastien (yellow card) 56' | Stadium: Stade de la Mosson; Attendance: 13,166; Referee: Pierre Gaillouste |

| 29 March 2023 29 | Marseille | 1–1 | Montpellier | Marseille |
| 21:00 CEST (UTC+2) | Guendouzi 44' (pen.); Veretout (yellow card) 45+6'; Gigot (yellow card) 82' | Report | Nordin 12'; Sakho (yellow card) 42'; Germain (yellow card) 81' | Stadium: Stade Vélodrome; Attendance: 58,231; Referee: Thomas Léonard |

| 9 April 2023 30 | Montpellier | 1–2 | Toulouse | Montpellier |
| 15:00 CEST (UTC+2) | Wahi 88' | Report | Dallinga 31'; Genreau (yellow card) 58'; Van den Boomen (yellow card) 70'; Chaïbi 85' | Stadium: Stade de la Mosson; Attendance: 17,283; Referee: Florent Batta |

| 16 April 2023 31 | Lille | 2–1 | Montpellier | Villeneuve-d'Ascq |
| 13:00 CEST (UTC+2) | Alexsandro (yellow card) 34'; David 70'; Cabella 72' | Report | Sylla 24'; Wahi (yellow card) 43'; Jullien (yellow card) 51'; Kouyaté (yellow card) 90+3' | Stadium: Stade Pierre-Mauroy; Attendance: 34,200; Referee: Jérôme Brisard |

| 23 April 2023 32 | Montpellier | 1–0 | Rennes | Montpellier |
| 17:05 CEST (UTC+2) | Kouyaté (yellow card) 46'; Savanier (red card) 52'; Wahi (yellow card) 54'; Khazri (yellow card) 55'; Mavididi 83' | Report | Ugochukwu (yellow card) 43'; Theate (yellow card) 54' | Stadium: Stade de la Mosson; Attendance: 15,537; Referee: Ruddy Buquet |

| 30 April 2023 33 | Monaco | 0–4 | Montpellier | Monaco |
| 13:00 CEST (UTC+2) | Ben Yedder (yellow card) 37'; Maripán (yellow card) 45+1' | Report | Nordin 28', 72'; Kouyaté (yellow card) 58'; Maouassa 65'; Mavididi 79' | Stadium: Stade Louis II; Attendance: 6,150; Referee: Marc Bollengier |

| 7 May 2023 34 | Lyon | 5–4 | Montpellier | Décines-Charpieu |
| 17:05 CEST (UTC+2) | Lacazette 31', 59', 82', 90+10' (pen.); Lovren 70' | Report | Wahi 40', 41', 53' (pen.), 55', (yellow card) 54'; Sacko (yellow card) 89'; Jullien (yellow card) 90+9' | Stadium: Parc Olympique Lyonnais; Attendance: 49,531; Referee: Bastien Dechepy |

| 14 May 2023 35 | Montpellier | 1–1 | Lorient | Montpellier |
| 15:00 CEST (UTC+2) | Ferri (yellow card) 33'; Kouyaté (yellow card) 89'; Maouassa 90+4' | Report | Meïté (yellow card) 25'; Koné (yellow card) 38'; Faivre 68'; Le Fée (yellow card) 90+1' | Stadium: Stade de la Mosson; Attendance: 12,595; Referee: Mathieu Vernice |

| 21 May 2023 36 | Nantes | 0–3 | Montpellier | Nantes |
| 17:00 CEST (UTC+2) | Merlin (yellow card) 20'; Moutoussamy (yellow card) 49'; Mollet (yellow card) 58'; Blas (yellow card) 77' | Report | Ferri 38'; Nordin 47'; Sacko 88' | Stadium: Stade de la Beaujoire; Attendance: 30,170; Referee: Ruddy Buquet |

| 27 May 2023 37 | Montpellier | 2–3 | Nice | Montpellier |
| 21:00 CEST (UTC+2) | Savanier 6', 16' (pen.) | Report | Barkley 52'; Boudaoui (yellow card) 62'; Laborde 66', 78'; Rosario (yellow card) 87'; Dante (yellow card) 89' | Stadium: Stade de la Mosson; Attendance: 16,340; Referee: Benoît Millot |

| 3 June 2023 38 | Reims | 1–3 | Montpellier | Reims |
| 21:00 CEST (UTC+2) | Abdelhamid (yellow card) 13'; Balogun 28' | Report | Leroy (yellow card) 44'; Wahi 54', 76'; Nordin 59', (yellow card) 66' | Stadium: Stade Auguste Delaune; Attendance: 15,036; Referee: Pierre Gaillouste |

=== Coupe de France ===
| 6 January 2023 Round of 64 | Pau | 2–1 | Montpellier | Pau |
| 18:00 CET (UTC+1) | Bassouamina 25'; George 82' | Report | Germain 70' | Stadium: Nouste Camp; Attendance: 3,349; Referee: Mathieu Vernice |

== Statistics ==
=== Appearances and goals ===
Last updated 19 February 2023.

| No. | Pos | Nat | Player | Total | | Ligue 1 | | Coupe de France | |
| No. | Pos | Nat | Player | Apps | Goals | Apps | Goals | Apps | Goals |
Goalkeepers
| 16 | GK | (France) FRA | Dimitry Bertaud | 0 | 0 | 0 | 0 | 0 | 0 |
| 30 | GK | (France) FRA | Matis Carvalho | 2 | 0 | 1+1 | 0 | 0 | 0 |
| 40 | GK | (France) FRA | Benjamin Lecomte | 5 | 0 | 5+0 | 0 | 0 | 0 |
| 90 | GK | (Senegal) SEN | Bingourou Kamara | 6 | 0 | 4+1 | 0 | 1+0 | 0 |
Defenders
| 3 | DF | (Guinea) GUI | Issiaga Sylla | 3 | 0 | 3+0 | 0 | 0 | 0 |
| 4 | DF | (Mali) MLI | Boubakar Kouyaté | 4 | 0 | 4+0 | 0 | 0 | 0 |
| 5 | DF | (Portugal) POR | Pedro Mendes | 0 | 0 | 0 | 0 | 0 | 0 |
| 6 | DF | (France) FRA | Christopher Jullien | 18 | 0 | 18+0 | 0 | 0 | 0 |
| 14 | DF | (France) FRA | Maxime Estève | 19 | 0 | 14+4 | 0 | 1+0 | 0 |
| 17 | DF | (France) FRA | Théo Sainte-Luce | 5 | 1 | 5+0 | 1 | 0 | 0 |
| 26 | DF | (France) FRA | Thibault Tamas | 0 | 0 | 0 | 0 | 0 | 0 |
| 27 | DF | (France) FRA | Faitout Maouassa | 23 | 1 | 16+6 | 1 | 0+1 | 0 |
| 29 | DF | (Cameroon) CMR | Enzo Tchato | 18 | 1 | 11+6 | 1 | 1+0 | 0 |
| 37 | DF | (France) FRA | Téo Allix | 0 | 0 | 0 | 0 | 0 | 0 |
| 75 | DF | (France) FRA | Mamadou Sakho | 10 | 1 | 5+4 | 1 | 1+0 | 0 |
| 77 | DF | (Mali) MLI | Falaye Sacko | 21 | 0 | 17+3 | 0 | 0+1 | 0 |
Midfielders
| 11 | MF | (France) FRA | Téji Savanier | 20 | 8 | 20+0 | 8 | 0 | 0 |
| 12 | MF | (France) FRA | Jordan Ferri | 22 | 0 | 21+0 | 0 | 0+1 | 0 |
| 13 | MF | (France) FRA | Joris Chotard | 22 | 0 | 14+7 | 0 | 1+0 | 0 |
| 18 | MF | (France) FRA | Léo Leroy | 18 | 0 | 10+8 | 0 | 0 | 0 |
| 22 | MF | (France) FRA | Khalil Fayad | 16 | 0 | 5+10 | 0 | 1+0 | 0 |
| 34 | MF | (France) FRA | Mattéo Loubatières | 0 | 0 | 0 | 0 | 0 | 0 |
Forwards
| 7 | FW | (France) FRA | Arnaud Nordin | 23 | 4 | 16+6 | 4 | 1+0 | 0 |
| 9 | FW | (France) FRA | Valère Germain | 23 | 3 | 5+17 | 2 | 1+0 | 1 |
| 10 | FW | (England) ENG | Stephy Mavididi | 13 | 2 | 11+1 | 2 | 0+1 | 0 |
| 20 | FW | (Algeria) ALG | Yanis Guermouche | 0 | 0 | 0 | 0 | 0 | 0 |
| 21 | FW | (France) FRA | Elye Wahi | 21 | 8 | 20+1 | 8 | 0 | 0 |
| 28 | FW | (Republic of the Congo) CGO | Béni Makouana | 9 | 0 | 1+7 | 0 | 1+0 | 0 |
| 36 | FW | (France) FRA | Axel Gueguin | 2 | 0 | 0+2 | 0 | 0 | 0 |
| 39 | FW | (Senegal) SEN | Sérigné Faye | 2 | 0 | 0+2 | 0 | 0 | 0 |
| 99 | FW | (Tunisia) TUN | Wahbi Khazri | 17 | 3 | 10+6 | 3 | 1+0 | 0 |
Players transferred out during the season
| 1 | GK | (Switzerland) SUI | Jonas Omlin | 14 | 0 | 14+0 | 0 | 0 | 0 |
| 2 | DF | (France) FRA | Arnaud Souquet | 12 | 0 | 3+9 | 0 | 0 | 0 |
| 31 | DF | (France) FRA | Nicolas Cozza | 18 | 2 | 14+3 | 2 | 1+0 | 0 |
| 19 | MF | (France) FRA | Sacha Delaye | 4 | 1 | 0+3 | 1 | 0+1 | 0 |

=== Top scorers ===
Includes all competitive matches. The list is sorted by squad number when total goals are equal.

Last updated 19 February 2023.

| Rank | Position | Nationality | No. | Player | Ligue 1 | Coupe de France | Total |
|---|---|---|---|---|---|---|---|
| 1 | MF | (France) | 11 | Téji Savanier | 8 | 0 | 8 |
| 1 | FW | (France) | 21 | Elye Wahi | 8 | 0 | 8 |
| 3 | FW | (France) | 7 | Arnaud Nordin | 4 | 0 | 4 |
| 4 | FW | (France) | 9 | Valère Germain | 2 | 1 | 3 |
| 4 | FW | (Tunisia) | 99 | Wahbi Khazri | 3 | 0 | 3 |
| 6 | DF | (France) | 31 | Nicolas Cozza | 2 | 0 | 2 |
| 6 | FW | (England) | 10 | Stephy Mavididi | 2 | 0 | 2 |
| 8 | DF | (France) | 17 | Théo Sainte-Luce | 1 | 0 | 1 |
| 8 | DF | (France) | 27 | Faitout Maouassa | 1 | 0 | 1 |
| 8 | DF | (Cameroon) | 29 | Enzo Tchato | 1 | 0 | 1 |
| 8 | DF | (France) | 75 | Mamadou Sakho | 1 | 0 | 1 |
| 8 | MF | (France) | 19 | Sacha Delaye | 1 | 0 | 1 |
| | Own goals | | | | 1 | 0 | 1 |
| | TOTALS | | | | 35 | 1 | 36 |

=== Cleansheets ===
Includes all competitive matches. The list is sorted by squad number when total cleansheets are equal.

Last updated 19 February 2023.

| Rank | Position | Nationality | No. | Player | Ligue 1 | Coupe de France | Total |
|---|---|---|---|---|---|---|---|
1
| 1 | GK | (Switzerland) | 1 | Jonas Omlin | 3 | 0 | 3 |
| 1 | GK | (France) | 40 | Benjamin Lecomte | 3 | 0 | 3 |
| TOTALS | | | | | 6 | 0 | 6 |

=== Disciplinary record ===
Includes all competitive matches.

Last updated 19 February 2023.

| Position | Nationality | Number | Name | Ligue 1 | | | Coupe de France | | | Total | | |
| Position | Nationality | Number | Name | Yellow card | (yellow card) (yellow-red card) | Red card | Yellow card | (yellow card) (yellow-red card) | Red card | Yellow card | (yellow card) (yellow-red card) | Red card |
| MF | (France) | 11 | Téji Savanier | 3 | 0 | 2 | 0 | 0 | 0 | 3 | 0 | 2 |
| FW | (France) | 21 | Elye Wahi | 4 | 1 | 0 | 0 | 0 | 0 | 4 | 1 | 0 |
| FW | (Tunisia) | 99 | Wahbi Khazri | 3 | 0 | 1 | 0 | 0 | 0 | 3 | 0 | 1 |
| GK | (Switzerland) | 1 | Jonas Omlin | 1 | 0 | 1 | 0 | 0 | 0 | 1 | 0 | 1 |
| MF | (France) | 22 | Khalil Fayad | 1 | 0 | 1 | 0 | 0 | 0 | 1 | 0 | 1 |
| FW | (England) | 10 | Stephy Mavididi | 1 | 0 | 1 | 0 | 0 | 0 | 1 | 0 | 1 |
| FW | (France) | 9 | Valère Germain | 0 | 0 | 1 | 0 | 0 | 0 | 0 | 0 | 1 |
| MF | (France) | 18 | Léo Leroy | 6 | 0 | 0 | 0 | 0 | 0 | 6 | 0 | 0 |
| MF | (France) | 12 | Jordan Ferri | 4 | 0 | 0 | 0 | 0 | 0 | 4 | 0 | 0 |
| MF | (France) | 13 | Joris Chotard | 4 | 0 | 0 | 0 | 0 | 0 | 4 | 0 | 0 |
| DF | (France) | 6 | Christopher Jullien | 3 | 0 | 0 | 0 | 0 | 0 | 3 | 0 | 0 |
| DF | (France) | 14 | Maxime Estève | 3 | 0 | 0 | 0 | 0 | 0 | 3 | 0 | 0 |
| DF | (France) | 31 | Nicolas Cozza | 3 | 0 | 0 | 0 | 0 | 0 | 3 | 0 | 0 |
| DF | (Mali) | 77 | Falaye Sacko | 2 | 0 | 0 | 0 | 0 | 0 | 2 | 0 | 0 |
| FW | (France) | 7 | Arnaud Nordin | 2 | 0 | 0 | 0 | 0 | 0 | 2 | 0 | 0 |
| GK | (Senegal) | 90 | Bingourou Kamara | 1 | 0 | 0 | 0 | 0 | 0 | 1 | 0 | 0 |
| DF | (France) | 2 | Arnaud Souquet | 1 | 0 | 0 | 0 | 0 | 0 | 1 | 0 | 0 |
| DF | (Cameroon) | 29 | Enzo Tchato | 1 | 0 | 0 | 0 | 0 | 0 | 1 | 0 | 0 |
| DF | (France) | 75 | Mamadou Sakho | 1 | 0 | 0 | 0 | 0 | 0 | 1 | 0 | 0 |
| FW | (Republic of the Congo) | 28 | Béni Makouana | 1 | 0 | 0 | 0 | 0 | 0 | 1 | 0 | 0 |
| | | | TOTALS | 45 | 1 | 7 | 0 | 0 | 0 | 45 | 1 | 7 |
