= 2021–22 Montpellier HSC season =

Montpellier HSC
2021–22 season
- President: Laurent Nicollin
- Head coach: Olivier Dall'Oglio
- Stadium: Stade de la Mosson
- Ligue 1: 13th
- Coupe de France: Round of 16
- Top goalscorer: League: Elye Wahi (10); All: Elye Wahi (10)
Home colours	Away colours	Third colours

The 2021–22 season was the 103rd season in the existence of Montpellier HSC and the club's 13th consecutive season in the top flight of French football. In addition to the domestic league, Montpellier participated in this season's edition of the Coupe de France.

== Players ==
=== First-team squad ===
Note: Flags indicate national team as defined under FIFA eligibility rules; some limited exceptions apply. Players may hold more than one non-FIFA nationality.

No.	Pos.	Nation	Player
1	GK	SUI	Jonas Omlin
2	DF	FRA	Arnaud Souquet
3	DF	FRA	Mamadou Sakho
5	DF	POR	Pedro Mendes
6	MF	FRA	Junior Sambia
7	DF	SRB	Mihailo Ristić
8	DF	CMR	Ambroise Oyongo
9	FW	FRA	Valère Germain
10	FW	ENG	Stephy Mavididi
11	MF	FRA	Téji Savanier (captain)
12	MF	FRA	Jordan Ferri (vice-captain)
13	MF	FRA	Joris Chotard
14	DF	FRA	Maxime Estève

No.	Pos.	Nation	Player
16	GK	FRA	Dimitry Bertaud
17	DF	FRA	Thibault Tamas
18	MF	FRA	Léo Leroy
20	FW	FRA	Yanis Guermouche
21	FW	FRA	Elye Wahi
22	DF	URU	Mathías Suárez
23	FW	USA	Nicholas Gioacchini (on loan from Caen)
25	MF	FRA	Florent Mollet
26	DF	BRA	Matheus Thuler (on loan from Flamengo)
28	FW	CGO	Béni Makouana
30	GK	FRA	Matis Carvalho
31	DF	FRA	Nicolas Cozza

=== Out on loan ===
Note: Flags indicate national team as defined under FIFA eligibility rules; some limited exceptions apply. Players may hold more than one non-FIFA nationality.

No.	Pos.	Nation	Player
—	DF	FRA	Clément Vidal (on loan to Ajaccio)

== Transfers ==
=== In ===
No.	Pos	Player	Transferred from	Fee	Date	Source
28	FW	(France) Valère Germain	Free transfer		1 September 2021	

== Pre-season and friendlies ==
Win Draw Loss

10 July 2021 Friendly	Montpellier	2–4	Sète	Montpellier, France
19:00 CEST (UTC+2)	Delort 11'; Wahi 19'	Report	Ngom 22' (pen.), 42'; Obyssa 65'; Célestine 70'	Stadium: Stade Bernard Gasset

14 July 2021 Friendly	Montpellier	1–0	Rodez	Montpellier, France
18:00 CEST (UTC+2)	Wahi 45+1'	Report		Stadium: Stade Bernard Gasset

17 July 2021 Friendly	Clermont	3–2	Montpellier	Millau, France
18:00 CEST (UTC+2)	Ogier 45+5'; Bayo 58'; Tell 90+2'	Report	Wahi 9'; Mollet 30'	Stadium: Stade Gabriel-Monteillet

23 July 2021 Friendly	RB Leipzig	1–2	Montpellier	Leipzig, Germany
18:00 CEST (UTC+2)	Sørloth 10'; Owusu (yellow card) 26'	Report	Laborde (yellow card) 25'; Sambia (yellow card) 28'; Makouana 96'; Wahi 117'	Stadium: Trainingszentrum RB Leipzig Platz 1 Attendance: 650
Note: The match was played in four quarters 30 minutes each.

31 July 2021 Friendly	Metz	1–0	Montpellier	Metz, France
18:00 CEST (UTC+2)	N'Doram 22'	Report		Stadium: Stade Saint-Symphorien

== Competitions ==
=== Overall record ===
Competition	First match	Last match	Starting round	Final position	Record							
Competition	First match	Last match	Starting round	Final position	Pld	W	D	L	GF	GA	GD	Win %
Ligue 1	8 August 2021	21 May 2022	Matchday 1	13th	38	12	7	19	49	61	−12	31.58
Coupe de France	19 December 2021	29 January 2022	Round of 64	Round of 16	3	2	1	0	3	1	+2	66.67
Total					41	14	8	19	52	62	−10	34.15

Source: Soccerway

=== Ligue 1 ===
==== League table ====
Pos	Team	Pld	W	D	L	GF	GA	GD	Pts
11	Brest	38	13	9	16	49	57	−8	48
12	Reims	38	11	13	14	43	44	−1	46
13	Montpellier	38	12	7	19	49	61	−12	43
14	Angers	38	10	11	17	44	55	−11	41
15	Troyes	38	9	11	18	37	53	−16	38

Source: Ligue 1
Rules for classification: 1) Points; 2) Goal difference; 3) Head-to-head points; 4) Head-to-head goal difference; 5) Head-to-head goals scored; 6) Head-to-head away goals scored; 7) Goals scored; 8) Away goals scored; 9) Fair-play points (Note: Head-to-head record is used only after all the matches between the teams in question have been played).

==== Results summary ====
Overall								Home						Away					
Pld	W	D	L	GF	GA	GD	Pts	W	D	L	GF	GA	GD	W	D	L	GF	GA	GD
38	12	7	19	49	61	−12	43	7	5	7	27	26	+1	5	2	12	22	35	−13

Source: Ligue 1

==== Results by round ====
Round	1	2	3	4	5	6	7	8	9	10	11	12	13	14	15	16	17	18	19	20	21	22	23	24	25	26	27	28	29	30	31	32	33	34	35	36	37	38
Ground	H	A	H	A	H	A	H	A	H	H	A	H	A	A	H	A	H	A	H	H	A	H	A	H	A	H	A	H	A	H	A	H	A	A	H	A	H	A
Result	L	D	W	L	W	D	D	L	D	W	L	W	W	L	L	W	W	W	W	L	L	W	L	L	W	L	L	D	W	L	L	D	L	L	D	L	L	L
Position	17	13	6	11	9	8	10	14	13	13	13	11	6	10	11	9	9	5	5	5	9	6	7	11	9	11	11	11	11	11	11	11	11	11	12	13	13	13

Source: Ligue 1
A = Away; H = Home; W = Win; D = Draw; L = Loss

==== Matches ====
The league fixtures were announced on 25 June 2021.

8 August 2021 1	Montpellier	2–3	Marseille	Montpellier
20:45 CEST (UTC+2)	Peres 30' (o.g.); Laborde 34'	Report	Peres (yellow card) 44'; Ünder 68'; Payet 75', 80'	Stadium: Stade de la Mosson; Attendance: 13,459; Referee: Jérémie Pignard

15 August 2021 2	Reims	3–3	Montpellier	Reims
15:00 CEST (UTC+2)	Cassamá 7', 26'; Cafaro (yellow card) 32'; Locko (yellow card) 49'; Kebbal 82'	Report	Cozza 5'; Thuler (yellow card) 25'; Delort 38'; Laborde 43'	Stadium: Stade Auguste-Delaune; Attendance: 8,887; Referee: Jérémy Stinat

22 August 2021 3	Montpellier	3–1	Lorient	Montpellier
15:00 CEST (UTC+2)	Savanier 50'; Mavididi 58'; Delort 83'	Report	Bertaud 21' (o.g.); Lemoine (yellow card) 49'; Monconduit (yellow card) 67'; Mendes (yellow card) 84' (yellow-red card) 86'; Hergault (yellow card) 87' (yellow-red card) 90+1'	Stadium: Stade de la Mosson; Attendance: 6,527; Referee: Bastien Dechepy

29 August 2021 4	Lille	2–1	Montpellier	Villeneuve-d'Ascq
17:00 CEST (UTC+2)	Fonte (yellow card) 25'; André (yellow card) 33'; Xeka (yellow card) 43'; Yazıcı 45+1'; David 56'	Report	Sambia (yellow card) 24' (yellow-red card) 73'; Ferri (yellow card) 25'; Laborde (yellow card) 34', (goal) 45+4'; Savanier (yellow card) 56'; Chotard (yellow card) 59'; Mollet (yellow card) 70'	Stadium: Stade Pierre-Mauroy; Attendance: 28,859; Referee: Amaury Delerue

12 September 2021 5	Montpellier	2–0	Saint-Étienne	Montpellier
13:00 CEST (UTC+2)	Mavididi 32'; Wahi (yellow card) 34'; Germain 62'	Report	Bouanga (yellow card) 55'; Neyou (yellow card) 69'; Nadé (yellow card) 73'; Saban (yellow card) 88'	Stadium: Stade de la Mosson; Attendance: 10,402; Referee: Benoît Bastien

19 September 2021 6	Troyes	1–1	Montpellier	Troyes
15:00 CEST (UTC+2)	Touzghar 37'; Dingomé (yellow card) 44'; Banhie-Zoukrou (yellow card) 71'; Chavalerin (yellow card) 81'; Rodrigues (yellow card) 90+1'	Report	Thuler (yellow card) 23' (yellow-red card) 79'; Ferri (yellow card) 49'; Savanier (yellow card) 51', (goal) 87'	Stadium: Stade de l'Aube; Attendance: 7,405; Referee: Florent Batta

22 September 2021 7	Montpellier	3–3	Bordeaux	Montpellier
19:00 CEST (UTC+2)	Germain 11', 50'; Mollet 72'	Report	Hwang 18'; Onana 29'; Kalu 85'; Gregersen (yellow card) 90+1'; Mara (yellow card) 90+3'	Stadium: Stade de la Mosson; Attendance: 9,585; Referee: Mikael Lesage

25 September 2021 8	Paris Saint-Germain	2–0	Montpellier	Paris
21:00 CEST (UTC+2)	Gueye 14'; Draxler 88'	Report	Makouana (yellow card) 90+1'	Stadium: Parc des Princes; Attendance: 47,408; Referee: Antony Gautier

2 October 2021 9	Montpellier	1–1	Strasbourg	Montpellier
17:00 CEST (UTC+2)	Mollet 12', (yellow card) 54'; Sakho (yellow card) 90+1'	Report	Gameiro 28'	Stadium: Stade de la Mosson; Attendance: 9,851; Referee: Hakim Ben El Hadj

17 October 2021 10	Montpellier	1–0	Lens	Montpellier
17:00 CEST (UTC+2)	Mavididi 47'; Chotard (yellow card) 58'; Estève (yellow card) 67'; Ferri (yellow card) 68' (yellow-red card) 87'	Report	Wooh (yellow card) 29'; Costa (yellow card) 62'; Jean (yellow card) 77'; Saïd (yellow card) 81'	Stadium: Stade de la Mosson; Attendance: 12,474; Referee: Florent Batta

24 October 2021 11	Monaco	3–1	Montpellier	Monaco
17:00 CEST (UTC+2)	Volland 12'; Ben Yedder 17'; Maripán (yellow card) 24'; Martins 62'	Report	Cozza (yellow card) 43'; Ristić (yellow card) 52'; Makouana (yellow card) 66'; Savanier 81' (pen.), (yellow card) 87'	Stadium: Stade Louis II; Attendance: 4,861; Referee: François Letexier

31 October 2021 12	Montpellier	2–0	Nantes	Montpellier
15:00 CET (UTC+1)	Savanier (yellow card) 37'; Sakho (yellow card) 42'; Mollet 64'; Wahi 71'; Ferri (yellow card) 90+2'	Report	Appiah (yellow card) 35'; Traoré (yellow card) 44'; Pallois (yellow card) 73'; Girotto (yellow card) 90'; Castelletto (yellow card) 90+2'	Stadium: Stade de la Mosson; Attendance: 11,267; Referee: Bastien Dechepy

7 November 2021 13	Nice	0–1	Montpellier	Nice
17:00 CET (UTC+1)	Thuram (yellow card) 63'; Bard (yellow card) 77'	Report	Mollet 80'	Stadium: Allianz Riviera; Attendance: 20,157; Referee: Antony Gautier

20 November 2021 14	Rennes	2–0	Montpellier	Rennes
21:00 CET (UTC+1)	Terrier 8'; Majer 28'; Tait (yellow card) 86'	Report	Savanier (yellow card) 3' (yellow-red card) 41'; Mollet (yellow card) 6'	Stadium: Roazhon Park; Attendance: 27,003; Referee: Mikael Lesage

28 November 2021 15	Montpellier	0–1	Lyon	Montpellier
17:00 CET (UTC+1)	Ferri (yellow card) 68'	Report	Paquetá 16'; Slimani (yellow card) 29'; Caqueret (yellow card) 40'; Boateng (yellow card) 45'; Emerson (yellow card) 67'	Stadium: Stade de la Mosson; Attendance: 14,747; Referee: Thomas Léonard

1 December 2021 16	Metz	1–3	Montpellier	Metz
19:00 CET (UTC+1)	Sarr (yellow card) 34'; Bronn (yellow card) 36'; De Préville 70'	Report	Savanier 36'; Mavididi 45+1'; Wahi 48'; Mollet (yellow card) 72'; Ristić (yellow card) 83'	Stadium: Stade Saint-Symphorien; Attendance: 13,992; Referee: Ruddy Buquet

5 December 2021 17	Montpellier	1–0	Clermont	Montpellier
15:00 CET (UTC+1)	Wahi 28'; Mavididi (yellow card) 38'; Sambia (yellow card) 50'; Chotard (yellow card) 90'	Report	Abdul Samed (yellow card) 51' (yellow-red card) 90+3'; Gastien (yellow card) 90+3'	Stadium: Stade de la Mosson; Attendance: 9,643; Referee: Florent Batta

11 December 2021 18	Brest	0–4	Montpellier	Brest
17:00 CET (UTC+1)	Hérelle (yellow card) 62'; Magnetti (yellow card) 84'	Report	Wahi 45+1'; Mavididi 47'; Sambia 60'; Germain 85'	Stadium: Stade Francis-Le Blé; Attendance: 11,332; Referee: Benoît Millot

22 December 2021 19	Montpellier	4–1	Angers	Montpellier
21:00 CET (UTC+1)	Savanier 14'; Cozza 30'; Sambia (yellow card) 48'; Ristić 51'; Mavididi 76'	Report	Boufal (yellow card) 13'; Pereira Lage 45+1'	Stadium: Stade de la Mosson; Attendance: 10,990; Referee: Hugo Miguel

16 January 2022 21	Strasbourg	3–1	Montpellier	Strasbourg
15:00 CET (UTC+1)	Bellegarde (yellow card) 22'; Kandil (yellow card) 70'; Waris 77'; Thomasson 84'; Gameiro 86'	Report	Mollet 11'; Ferri (yellow card) 59'; Savanier (yellow card) 65'; Wahi (red card) 66'	Stadium: Stade de la Meinau; Attendance: 5,217; Referee: Pierre Gaillouste

19 January 2022 20	Montpellier	0–1	Troyes	Montpellier
19:00 CET (UTC+1)	Mollet (yellow card) 39'; Souquet (yellow card) 58'; Savanier (red card) 63'; Chotard (yellow card) 66'; Mavididi (yellow card) 68'; Ferri (yellow card) 87'	Report	Biancone (yellow card) 21'; Chavalerin 74'	Stadium: Stade de la Mosson; Attendance: 4,943; Referee: Jérémy Stinat

23 January 2022 22	Montpellier	3–2	Monaco	Montpellier
17:05 CET (UTC+1)	Wahi 12'; Mavididi 32', 90+1', (yellow card) 90+2'; Sambia (yellow card) 90+2'	Report	Caio (yellow card) 10'; Ben Yedder 34'; Aguilar (yellow card) 65'; Vanderson 81'	Stadium: Stade de la Mosson; Attendance: 5,000; Referee: Jérémie Pignard

5 February 2022 23	Saint-Étienne	3–1	Montpellier	Saint-Étienne
17:00 CET (UTC+1)	Mangala (yellow card) 16'; Hamouma 82'; Nordin 90'; Khazri 90+3'	Report	Wahi 11'	Stadium: Stade Geoffroy-Guichard; Attendance: 20,000; Referee: Thomas Léonard

12 February 2022 24	Montpellier	0–1	Lille	Montpellier
17:00 CET (UTC+1)	Ferri (yellow card) 46'; Savanier (yellow card) 83'; Germain (yellow card) 87'	Report	André (yellow card) 18'; Gomes (yellow card) 22'; Çelik (yellow card) 45'; Xeka (yellow card) 64', (goal) 77'	Stadium: Stade de la Mosson; Attendance: 11,784; Referee: Stéphanie Frappart

20 February 2022 25	Lorient	0–1	Montpellier	Lorient
15:00 CET (UTC+1)	Laporte (yellow card) 31'; Innocent (yellow card) 47'	Report	Savanier 56'; Oyongo (yellow card) 60'; Souquet (yellow card) 61'	Stadium: Stade du Moustoir; Attendance: 10,135; Referee: Jérémy Stinat

25 February 2022 26	Montpellier	2–4	Rennes	Montpellier
21:00 CET (UTC+1)	Oyongo 19', (yellow card) 85'; Savanier (yellow card) 26'; Wahi 41'; Germain (yellow card) 74'	Report	Terrier 8'; Bourigeaud 15'; Traoré (yellow card) 28'; Laborde 52' (pen.); Omari (yellow card) 70'; Majer 84'	Stadium: Stade de la Mosson; Attendance: 11,000; Referee: Amaury Delerue

6 March 2022 27	Nantes	2–0	Montpellier	Nantes
15:00 CET (UTC+1)	Castelletto (yellow card) 30'; Kolo Muani 69'; Geubbels 90+2'	Report	Ristić (yellow card) 79'	Stadium: Stade de la Beaujoire; Attendance: 21,589; Referee: Hakim Ben El Hadj

12 March 2022 28	Montpellier	0–0	Nice	Montpellier
17:00 CET (UTC+1)	Estève (yellow card) 20'; Savanier (penalty missed) 39'; Wahi (yellow card) 69'; Makouana (yellow card) 90+2'	Report	Lotomba (yellow card) 22'; Boudaoui (yellow card) 32'; Dante (red card) 35'	Stadium: Stade de la Mosson; Attendance: 11,658; Referee: Clément Turpin

20 March 2022 29	Bordeaux	0–2	Montpellier	Bordeaux
15:00 CET (UTC+1)	Mensah (yellow card) 23'; Ahmedhodžić (yellow card) 34'; Fransérgio (yellow card) 37'; Elis (penalty missed) 42'	Report	Wahi 11'; Mollet 16'; Cozza (red card) 39'; Ristić (red card) 45+5'	Stadium: Matmut Atlantique; Attendance: 15,000; Referee: Thomas Léonard

3 April 2022 30	Montpellier	1–2	Brest	Montpellier
15:00 CEST (UTC+2)	Mavididi (yellow card) 32'; Sakho (yellow card) 33'; Savanier 90+3' (pen.)	Report	Satriano (yellow card) 7', (goal) 69'; Hérelle (yellow card) 31'; Chardonnet (yellow card) 66'; Honorat 79'; Brassier (yellow card) 90+1'	Stadium: Stade de la Mosson; Attendance: 10,929; Referee: Florent Batta

10 April 2022 31	Marseille	2–0	Montpellier	Marseille
21:00 CEST (UTC+2)	Dieng 9'; Ünder 19' (pen.)	Report	Ferri (yellow card) 18'; Leroy (yellow card) 66'; Omlin (red card) 90'	Stadium: Stade Vélodrome; Attendance: 51,131; Referee: Jérémy Stinat

17 April 2022 32	Montpellier	0–0	Reims	Montpellier
15:00 CEST (UTC+2)		Report	Munetsi (yellow card) 60'; Foket (yellow card) 70'; Rajković (yellow card) 87'	Stadium: Stade de la Mosson; Attendance: 10,170; Referee: Antony Gautier

20 April 2022 33	Lens	2–0	Montpellier	Lens
21:00 CEST (UTC+2)	Costa 37', (yellow card) 70'; Ganago 75'	Report		Stadium: Stade Bollaert-Delelis; Attendance: 36,250; Referee: Romain Lissorgue

23 April 2022 34	Lyon	5–2	Montpellier	Décines-Charpieu
17:00 CEST (UTC+2)	Dembélé 26'; Mendes 43'; Aouar 63', 90+3'; Toko Ekambi 68'; Boateng (yellow card) 75'; Gusto (yellow card) 89'	Report	Oyongo (yellow card) 28'; Cozza (yellow card) 42'; Wahi 45+1'; Savanier 45+3' (pen.)	Stadium: Groupama Stadium; Attendance: 46,608; Referee: François Letexier

1 May 2022 35	Montpellier	2–2	Metz	Montpellier
15:00 CEST (UTC+2)	Oyongo (yellow card) 29'; Leroy (yellow card) 58'; Souquet 80'; Wahi 90+1'	Report	Delaine 24'; Pajot (yellow card) 51'; Sarr (yellow card) 66'; Lamkel Zé (yellow card) 68'; Mafouta 70'	Stadium: Stade de la Mosson; Attendance: 10,446; Referee: Clément Turpin

8 May 2022 36	Clermont	2–1	Montpellier	Clermont-Ferrand
15:00 CEST (UTC+2)	Rashani 4'; Abdul Samed (yellow card) 35'; Gastien (yellow card) 60'; Bayo 69' (pen.)	Report	Mollet (yellow card) 24'; Chotard 32', (yellow card) 74'; Souquet (yellow card) 71'; Leroy (yellow card) 74'	Stadium: Stade Gabriel Montpied; Attendance: 11,857; Referee: Benoît Bastien

14 May 2022 37	Montpellier	0–4	Paris Saint-Germain	Montpellier
21:00 CEST (UTC+2)	Souquet (yellow card) 41'; Ferri (yellow card) 89'	Report	Messi 6', 20'; Di María 26'; Herrera (yellow card) 34'; Mbappé 60' (pen.), (yellow card) 85'; Simons (yellow card) 70'; Marquinhos (yellow card) 90+2'	Stadium: Stade de la Mosson; Attendance: 19,586; Referee: Jérémy Stinat

21 May 2022 38	Angers	2–0	Montpellier	Angers
21:00 CEST (UTC+2)	Mangani 45+1' (pen.); Pereira Lage 67'; Fulgini (yellow card) 71'	Report	Makouana (yellow card) 30'; Oyongo (yellow card) 44'; Germain (yellow card) 54'; Ferri (yellow card) 59'	Stadium: Stade Raymond Kopa; Attendance: 11,249; Referee: Romain Lissorgue

=== Coupe de France ===
19 December 2021 Round of 64	Andrézieux-Bouthéon FC	0–1	Montpellier	Andrézieux-Bouthéon
16:00 CET (UTC+1)	Diallo (yellow card) 15'; Nyemeck (yellow card) 67'	Report	Thuler (yellow card) 44'; Savanier 68' (pen.); Mavididi (yellow card) 71'; Souquet (yellow card) 81'	Stadium: Envol Stadium; Referee: Clément Turpin

2 January 2022 Round of 32	Montpellier	1–0	Strasbourg	Montpellier
16:00 CET (UTC+1)	Mollet (yellow card) 12'; Ristić 20'; Bertaud (yellow card) 80'	Report	Diallo (yellow card) 27', (penalty missed) 45+1'; Sissoko (yellow card) 48'; Ajorque (yellow card) 73'; Djiku (yellow card) 90+1'	Stadium: Stade de la Mosson; Attendance: 4,575; Referee: Amaury Delerue

29 January 2022 Round of 16	Marseille	1–1 (5–4 p)	Montpellier	Marseille
21:00 CET (UTC+1)	Milik 74'; Kamara (yellow card) 90+1'	Report	Makouana 80'	Stadium: Stade Vélodrome; Attendance: 5,000; Referee: Benoît Millot
	Penalties
	Rongier (penalty scored); Milik (penalty scored); Ünder (penalty scored); Guendouzi (penalty scored); Payet (penalty scored)		(penalty scored) Sakho; (penalty missed) Ristić; (penalty scored) Leroy; (penalty scored) Delaye; (penalty scored) Chotard

== Statistics ==
=== Appearances and goals ===
Last updated 21 May 2022.

No.	Pos	Nat	Player	Total		Ligue 1		Coupe de France	
No.	Pos	Nat	Player	Apps	Goals	Apps	Goals	Apps	Goals
Goalkeepers
1	GK	(Switzerland) SUI	Jonas Omlin	29	0	29+0	0	0	0
16	GK	(France) FRA	Dimitry Bertaud	14	0	9+2	0	3+0	0
30	GK	(France) FRA	Matis Carvalho	0	0	0	0	0	0
Defenders
2	DF	(France) FRA	Arnaud Souquet	37	1	27+7	1	2+1	0
3	DF	(France) FRA	Mamadou Sakho	32	0	29+0	0	3+0	0
5	DF	(Portugal) POR	Pedro Mendes	1	0	0+1	0	0	0
7	DF	(Serbia) SRB	Mihailo Ristić	31	2	19+10	1	2+0	1
8	DF	(Cameroon) CMR	Ambroise Oyongo	12	1	7+4	1	1+0	0
14	DF	(France) FRA	Maxime Estève	24	0	20+4	0	0	0
17	DF	(France) FRA	Thibault Tamas	0	0	0	0	0	0
22	DF	(Uruguay) URU	Mathías Suárez (out on loan)	0	0	0	0	0	0
26	DF	(Brazil) BRA	Thuler	18	0	10+6	0	1+1	0
31	DF	(France) FRA	Nicolas Cozza	37	2	32+2	2	2+1	0
34	DF	(France) FRA	Redouane Halhal	0	0	0	0	0	0
35	DF	(Cameroon) CMR	Enzo Tchato	1	0	0+1	0	0	0
Midfielders
6	MF	(Ivory Coast) CIV	Junior Sambia	32	1	15+14	1	2+1	0
11	MF	(France) FRA	Téji Savanier	31	9	28+1	8	2+0	1
12	MF	(France) FRA	Jordan Ferri	36	0	33+1	0	2+0	0
13	MF	(France) FRA	Joris Chotard	37	1	33+2	1	2+0	0
15	MF	(Switzerland) SUI	Gabriel Barès (out on loan)	0	0	0	0	0	0
18	MF	(France) FRA	Léo Leroy	26	0	7+17	0	2+0	0
22	MF	(France) FRA	Rémy Cabella	5	0	3+2	0	0	0
25	MF	(France) FRA	Florent Mollet	38	6	32+3	6	3+0	0
34	MF	(France) FRA	Sacha Delaye	11	0	3+7	0	0+1	0
Forwards
9	FW	(Algeria) ALG	Andy Delort (transferred out)	3	2	3+0	2	0	0
9	FW	(France) FRA	Valère Germain	36	4	22+12	4	2+0	0
10	FW	(France) FRA	Gaëtan Laborde (transferred out)	4	3	4+0	3	0	0
10	FW	(England) ENG	Stephy Mavididi	32	8	27+4	8	0+1	0
20	FW	(Algeria) ALG	Yanis Guermouche	4	0	0+3	0	0+1	0
21	FW	(France) FRA	Elye Wahi	36	10	21+12	10	2+1	0
23	FW	(United States) USA	Nicholas Gioacchini (in on loan)	31	0	3+25	0	2+1	0
28	FW	(Republic of the Congo) CGO	Béni Makouana	25	1	1+22	0	0+2	1
32	FW	(Serbia) SRB	Petar Škuletić (transferred out)	0	0	0	0	0	0

=== Top scorers ===
Includes all competitive matches. The list is sorted by squad number when total goals are equal.

Last updated 21 May 2022.

Rank	Position	Nationality	No.	Player	Ligue 1	Coupe de France	Total
1	FW	(France)	21	Elye Wahi	10	0	10
2	MF	(France)	11	Téji Savanier	8	1	9
3	FW	(England)	10	Stephy Mavididi	8	0	8
4	MF	(France)	25	Florent Mollet	6	0	6
5	FW	(France)	9	Valère Germain	4	0	4
6	FW	(France)	10	Gaëtan Laborde	3	0	3
7	DF	(Serbia)	7	Mihailo Ristić	1	1	2
7	FW	(Algeria)	9	Andy Delort	2	0	2
7	DF	(France)	31	Nicolas Cozza	2	0	2
10	DF	(France)	2	Arnaud Souquet	1	0	1
10	MF	(Ivory Coast)	6	Junior Sambia	1	0	1
10	DF	(Cameroon)	8	Ambroise Oyongo	1	0	1
10	MF	(France)	13	Joris Chotard	1	0	1
10	FW	(Republic of the Congo)	28	Béni Makouana	0	1	1
	Own goals				1	0	1
	TOTALS				49	3	52

=== Cleansheets ===
Includes all competitive matches. The list is sorted by squad number when total cleansheets are equal.

Last updated 21 May 2022.

Rank	Position	Nationality	No.	Player	Ligue 1	Coupe de France	Total
1
1	GK	(Switzerland)	1	Jonas Omlin	7	0	7
2	GK	(France)	16	Dimitry Bertaud	2	2	4
TOTALS					9	2	11

=== Disciplinary record ===
Includes all competitive matches.

Last updated 21 May 2022.

Position	Nationality	Number	Name	Ligue 1			Coupe de France			Total		
Position	Nationality	Number	Name	Yellow card	(yellow card) (yellow-red card)	Red card	Yellow card	(yellow card) (yellow-red card)	Red card	Yellow card	(yellow card) (yellow-red card)	Red card
MF	(France)	11	Téji Savanier	9	1	1	0	0	0	9	1	1
DF	(Serbia)	7	Mihailo Ristić	3	0	1	0	0	0	3	0	1
FW	(France)	21	Elye Wahi	2	0	1	0	0	0	2	0	1
DF	(France)	31	Nicolas Cozza	2	0	1	0	0	0	2	0	1
GK	(Switzerland)	1	Jonas Omlin	0	0	1	0	0	0	0	0	1
MF	(France)	12	Jordan Ferri	13	1	0	0	0	0	13	1	0
MF	(Ivory Coast)	6	Junior Sambia	5	1	0	0	0	0	5	1	0
DF	(Brazil)	26	Thuler	3	1	0	1	0	0	4	1	0
MF	(France)	25	Florent Mollet	6	0	0	1	0	0	7	0	0
DF	(France)	2	Arnaud Souquet	5	0	0	1	0	0	6	0	0
DF	(Cameroon)	8	Ambroise Oyongo	5	0	0	0	0	0	5	0	0
FW	(England)	10	Stephy Mavididi	4	0	0	1	0	0	5	0	0
MF	(France)	13	Joris Chotard	5	0	0	0	0	0	5	0	0
FW	(Republic of the Congo)	28	Béni Makouana	4	0	0	0	0	0	4	0	0
DF	(France)	3	Mamadou Sakho	3	0	0	0	0	0	3	0	0
FW	(France)	9	Valère Germain	3	0	0	0	0	0	3	0	0
MF	(France)	18	Léo Leroy	3	0	0	0	0	0	3	0	0
DF	(France)	14	Maxime Estève	2	0	0	0	0	0	2	0	0
FW	(France)	10	Gaëtan Laborde	1	0	0	0	0	0	1	0	0
GK	(France)	16	Dimitry Bertaud	0	0	0	1	0	0	1	0	0
			TOTALS	78	4	5	5	0	0	83	4	5
