= Stephy Mavididi =

English footballer (born 1998)

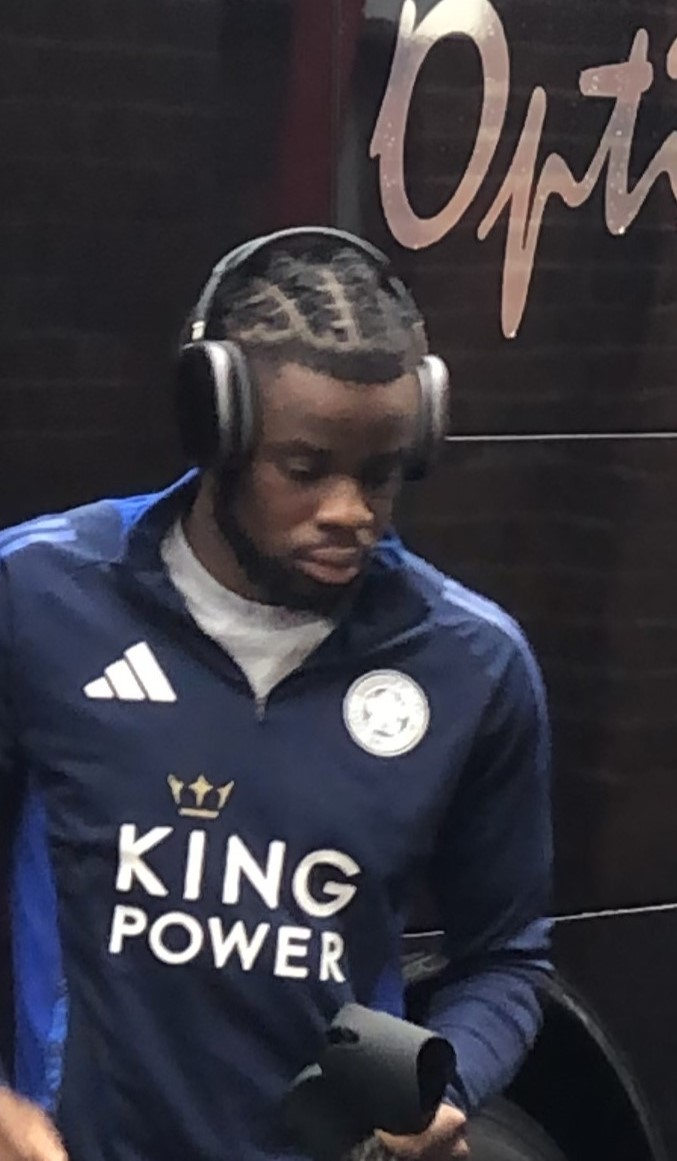
- Mavididi with Leicester City in 2024

Personal information
- Full name: Stephy Alvaro Mavididi
- Date of birth: 31 May 1998 (age 28)
- Place of birth: Derby, England
- Height: 1.82 m (6 ft 0 in)
- Positions: Forward; winger

Team information
- Current team: Watford (on loan from Leicester City)
- Number: 45

Youth career
- Southend United
- 2011–2016: Arsenal

Senior career*
Years	Team	Apps	(Gls)
2016–2018	Arsenal	0	(0)
2017	→ Charlton Athletic (loan)	5	(0)
2017–2018	→ Preston North End (loan)	10	(0)
2018	→ Charlton Athletic (loan)	12	(2)
2018–2019	Juventus U23	32	(6)
2018–2020	Juventus	1	(0)
2019–2020	→ Dijon (loan)	24	(5)
2020–2023	Montpellier	91	(21)
2023–	Leicester City	118	(19)
2026–	→ Watford (loan)	8	(1)

International career^{‡}
2015	England U17	9	(1)
2015	England U18	1	(0)
2016	England U19	5	(2)
2017	England U20	3	(3)
2026–	DR Congo	2	(0)
- * Club domestic league appearances and goals as of 09:20, 22 November 2026 (UTC) ‡ National team caps and goals as of 10:18, 6 October 2026 (UTC)

Stephy Alvaro Mavididi (born 31 May 1998) is a professional footballer who plays as a forward or winger for EFL Championship club Watford, on loan from Leicester City. Born in England, he represents the DR Congo national team.

== Early and personal life ==
Born in Derby, Mavididi was raised in East London. His younger brother Shaun is also a footballer. His great-grandmother was Congolese and married a Ugandan man who lived on the Uganda-DR Congo border and traded smoked fish on Lake Albert, regularly crossing between the two countries.

== Club career ==
=== Arsenal ===
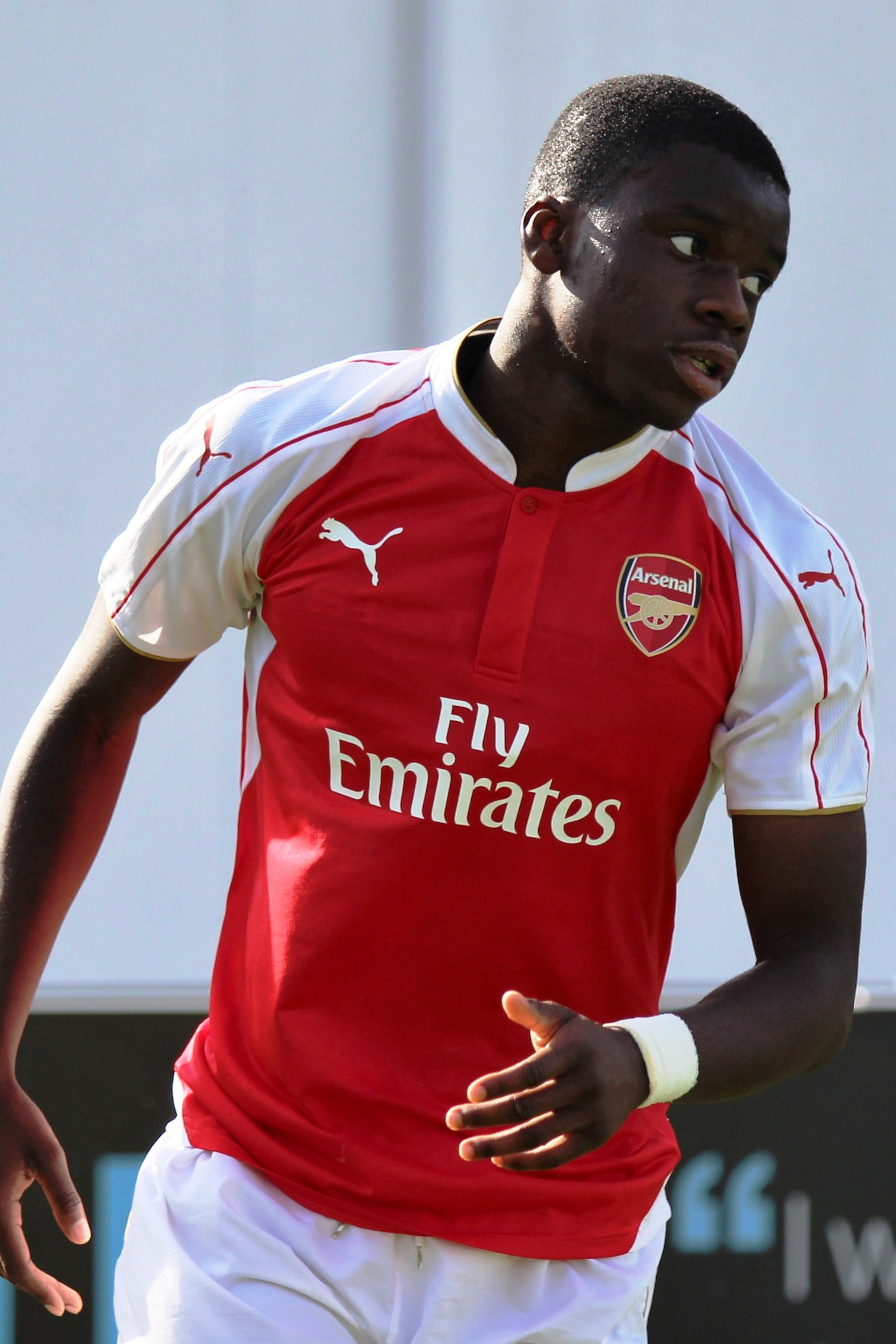
Mavididi playing for Arsenal U19s in 2015.

He began his career at Southend United before joining Arsenal at the age of 13. He turned professional with Arsenal in July 2015.

Mavididi joined Charlton Athletic on loan on 31 January 2017 until the end of the season. However, following an injury in his fifth game for the club, he returned to Arsenal on 1 March 2017, having made three starts and two substitute appearances.

He signed on loan for Preston North End in August 2017.

On 3 January 2018, it was announced by Arsenal that Mavididi had returned to the club and was then subsequently sent on loan with Charlton Athletic. In his first game of his second loan spell at Charlton he scored his first goal in professional football in a 1–0 win over Oldham Athletic. In February 2018 he suffered a hamstring injury.

=== Juventus ===
After eight years with Arsenal, in August 2018, he signed for Italian club Juventus. He was initially signed as a reserve player, having been scouted by Giorgio Chiellini's brother, but soon began training with the first team. On 13 April 2019, Mavididi made his senior Juventus debut in a 2–1 away loss against S.P.A.L. in Serie A. In doing so he became the first English player since David Platt in 1992 to play for Juventus. Juventus won the Serie A title in his first season, but Mavididi did not receive a winner's medal as he had not played in enough matches. Shortly after the championship title was confirmed, Mavididi learned that his father had died.

On 29 August 2019, he joined French club Dijon on loan.

=== Montpellier ===
On 30 June 2020, Mavididi joined French club Montpellier on a permanent deal worth €6.3 million.

On 16 April 2023, Mavididi became the English player with the most appearances in the history of Ligue 1 after making his 108th appearance, overtaking the record of Chris Waddle.

He later described his time with Montpellier saying "Everyone just sees the charmed life, but it is really more than that. For me personally I have been to some dark places being far away from home. For example I have a little brother and I basically missed all his teenage years growing up - it's little things like that, that can really take a toll on you [...] For me the dark times have made me 10 times stronger".

=== Leicester City ===
On 31 July 2023, Mavididi returned to England and joined Championship club Leicester City for an undisclosed fee reported to be around €7.5 million. On 6 August, he made his debut for Leicester, in which he assisted Kiernan Dewsbury-Hall's winning goal against Coventry City, in the club's first game of the season. On 12 August, he scored his first goal for Leicester in the league in the 73rd minute in a 1–0 away win against Huddersfield Town. His form over the next few weeks was inconsistent. Following a run of five goals in seven games, Mavididi was awarded the EFL Championship Player of the Month award for December 2023.

He signed on loan for Watford on 1 September 2026.

== International career ==
Mavididi was born in England and is of DR Congolese, and Ugandan descent.

Mavididi has played for England at under-17 youth level, representing them at the 2015 UEFA European Under-17 Championship, and the 2015 FIFA U-17 World Cup. He has also played for England at under-18 and under-19 levels.

Although he is eligible to play for the DR Congo national football team, Mavididi appeared to commit himself to England in December 2020, stating "my ultimate goal is to get into England's senior team, but for now the best pathway is the Under-21s so I want to try and get into that squad".

In September 2026, he was called-up by the DR Congo national team. He made his international debut in their first friendly against Uganda, which they lost 2–0.

== Career statistics ==
=== Club ===
As of match played 21 November 2026

Appearances and goals by club, season and competition
Club	Season	League			National cup (Note: Includes FA Cup, Coupe de France)		League cup (Note: Includes EFL Cup)		Other		Total	
Club	Season	Division	Apps	Goals	Apps	Goals	Apps	Goals	Apps	Goals	Apps	Goals
Arsenal	2016–17	Premier League	0	0	0	0	0	0	0	0	0	0
Arsenal	2017–18	Premier League	0	0	0	0	0	0	0	0	0	0
Arsenal	Total		0	0	0	0	0	0	0	0	0	0
Charlton Athletic (loan)	2016–17	League One	5	0	0	0	0	0	0	0	5	0
Preston North End (loan)	2017–18	Championship	10	0	0	0	1	0	—		11	0
Charlton Athletic (loan)	2017–18	League One	12	2	—		—		3 (Note: One appearance in EFL Trophy, two appearances in League One play-offs)	0	15	2
Juventus U23	2018–19	Serie C	32	6	—		—		—		32	6
Juventus	2018–19	Serie A	1	0	0	0	—		0	0	1	0
Juventus	2019–20	Serie A	0	0	0	0	—		0	0	0	0
Juventus	Total		1	0	0	0	0	0	0	0	1	0
Dijon (loan)	2019–20	Ligue 1	24	5	4	3	0	0	—		28	8
Montpellier	2020–21	Ligue 1	35	9	5	0	—		—		40	9
Montpellier	2021–22	Ligue 1	30	8	1	0	—		—		31	8
Montpellier	2022–23	Ligue 1	26	4	1	0	—		—		26	4
Montpellier	Total		91	21	7	0	0	0	0	0	98	21
Leicester City	2023–24	Championship	46	12	1	1	1	0	—		48	13
Leicester City	2024–25	Premier League	30	4	1	1	2	1	—		33	6
Leicester City	2025–26	Championship	42	3	2	1	1	0	—		45	4
Leicester City	2026–27	League One	0	0	0	0	1	0	0	0	1	0
Leicester City	Total		118	19	4	3	5	1	0	0	127	23
Watford (loan)	2026–27	Championship	8	1	0	0	0	0	0	0	8	1
Career total			301	54	15	6	6	1	3	0	325	61

=== International ===
As of match played 5 October 2026

DR Congo
Year	Apps	Goals
2026	2	0
Total	2	0

== Honours ==
Leicester City

- EFL Championship: 2023–24

Individual

- EFL Championship Player of the Month: December 2023
