= Léo Leroy =

French footballer (born 2000)

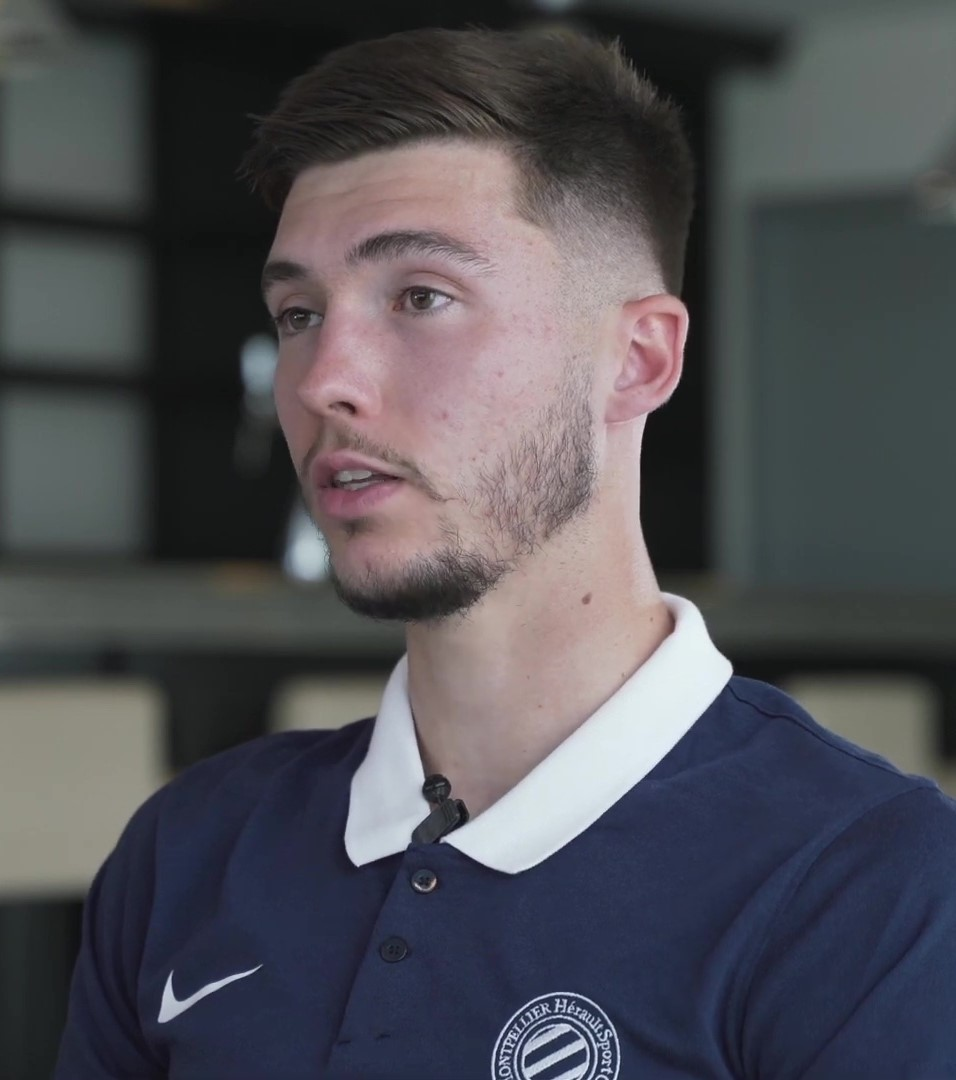
- Leroy with Montpellier in 2021

Personal information
- Full name: Léo Patrick Pierre Leroy
- Date of birth: 14 February 2000 (age 26)
- Place of birth: Marseille, France
- Height: 1.87 m (6 ft 2 in)
- Position: Midfielder

Team information
- Current team: Preston North End
- Number: 27

Youth career
- 2005–2006: Avion
- 2006–2007: Sochaux-Montbéliard
- 2007–2018: Rennes
- 2018–2019: Châteauroux

Senior career*
Years	Team	Apps	(Gls)
2018–2020	Châteauroux B	11	(3)
2019–2021	Châteauroux	55	(1)
2021–2024	Montpellier	72	(0)
2021–2022	Montpellier B	5	(2)
2024–2026	Basel	74	(4)
2026–	Preston North End	14	(1)

International career
2019	France U19	2	(0)
- * Club domestic league appearances and goals as of 02:30, 4 November 2026 (UTC)

Léo Patrick Pierre Leroy (born 14 February 2000) is a French professional footballer who plays as a midfielder for EFL Championship club Preston North End.

== Career ==
Leroy joined the youth academy of Rennes at the age of 8, and spent most of his football development there. On 6 February 2019, he signed his first professional contract with Châteauroux. He made his professional debut with Châteauroux in a 2–2 Ligue 2 tie with Brest on 1 March 2019.

On 28 May 2021, Leroy signed with Montpellier.

On 21 June 2024, Leroy signed for Swiss club Basel.

On 14 August 2026, Leroy signed for EFL Championship club Preston North End on a three-year deal.

== Personal life ==
Leroy is the son of the French former footballer Jérôme Leroy.

== Career statistics ==
=== Club ===
As of match played 3 November 2026

Appearances and goals by club, season and competition
Club	Season	League			National cup (Note: Includes Coupe de France and Swiss Cup)		Continental		Other		Total	
Club	Season	Division	Apps	Goals	Apps	Goals	Apps	Goals	Apps	Goals	Apps	Goals
Châteauroux	2018–19	Ligue 2	3	0	0	0	—		0	0	3	0
Châteauroux	2019–20	Ligue 2	19	1	0	0	—		1 (Note: Appearance(s) in Coupe de la Ligue)	0	20	1
Châteauroux	2020–21	Ligue 2	33	0	1	0	—		—		34	0
Châteauroux	Total		55	1	1	0	—		1	0	57	1
Montpellier	2021–22	Ligue 1	24	0	2	0	—		—		26	0
Montpellier	2022–23	Ligue 1	27	0	0	0	—		—		27	0
Montpellier	2023–24	Ligue 1	21	0	3	0	—		—		24	0
Montpellier	Total		72	0	5	0	—		—		77	0
Basel	2024–25	Swiss Super League	36	3	5	1	—		—		41	4
Basel	2025–26	Swiss Super League	35	1	2	0	10 (Note: Two appearances in UEFA Champions League; Eight appearances in UEFA Europa League)	0	—		47	1
Basel	2026–27	Swiss Super League	3	0	—		—		—		3	0
Basel	Total		74	4	7	1	10	0	—		91	5
Preston North End	2026–27	EFL Championship	14	1	0	0	—		1 (Note: Appearance in EFL Cup)	0	15	1
Career total			215	6	13	1	10	0	2	0	240	7

== Honours ==
Basel

- Swiss Super League: 2024–25
