= Nicolas Cozza =

French footballer (born 1999)

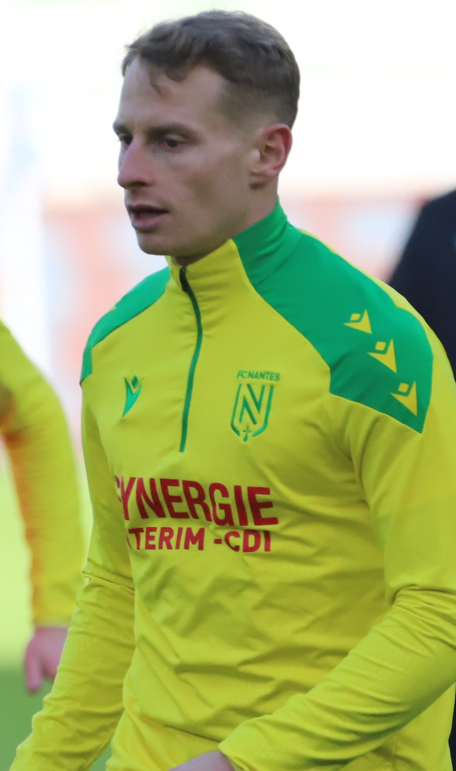
- Cozza with Nantes in 2025

Personal information
- Full name: Nicolas Louis Marcel Cozza
- Date of birth: 8 January 1999 (age 27)
- Place of birth: Ganges, France
- Height: 1.78 m (5 ft 10 in)
- Positions: Centre-back; left-back

Team information
- Current team: Lausanne-Sport
- Number: 31

Youth career
- 2005–2008: FC Pays Viganais Aigoual
- 2008–2010: US Basses Cévennes
- 2010–2017: Montpellier

Senior career*
Years	Team	Apps	(Gls)
2016–2019	Montpellier II	22	(0)
2017–2023	Montpellier	99	(5)
2023–2026	VfL Wolfsburg	11	(0)
2024	→ Nantes (loan)	13	(0)
2024–2026	→ Nantes (loan)	56	(1)
2026–	Lausanne-Sport	4	(0)

International career
2017	France U18	2	(0)
2017–2018	France U19	12	(1)
2018–2019	France U20	5	(0)
2019–2020	France U21	7	(0)
- * Club domestic league appearances and goals as of 20 September 2026

Nicolas Louis Marcel Cozza (born 8 January 1999) is a French professional footballer who plays as a centre-back or left-back for Swiss Super League club Lausanne-Sport.

== Club career ==
Cozza joined Montpellier in 2010 and signed his first professional contract on 14 June 2017. He made his professional debut for Montpellier in a 0–0 Ligue 1 draw against Lyon on 19 November 2017.

On 25 January 2023, Cozza signed a four-and-a-half-year contract with Bundesliga club VfL Wolfsburg.

On 1 February 2024, Cozza was loaned out to French side Nantes until the end of the season.

After remaining on the bench in the first two Wolfsburg games of the 2024–25 season, on 28 August 2024 Cozza returned to Nantes on a new season-long loan. A new Nantes loan for the 2025–26 season was announced on 8 July 2025. His VfL Wolfsburg contract was mutually terminated in May 2026.

On 30 August 2026, Cozza signed a three-year contract with Lausanne-Sport in Switzerland.

== Personal life ==
Cozza is the grandson of former Montpellier captain Jean-Louis Besson. He is of Italian descent from Calabria.

== Career statistics ==
As of match played 2 May 2026

Appearances and goals by club, season and competition
Club	Season	League			Cup		Other		Total	
Club	Season	Division	Apps	Goals	Apps	Goals	Apps	Goals	Apps	Goals
Montpellier B	2016–17	CFA	8	0	—		—		8	0
Montpellier B	2017–18	National 3	9	0	—		—		9	0
Montpellier B	2018–19	National 3	5	0	—		—		5	0
Montpellier B	Total		22	0	—		—		22	0
Montpellier	2017–18	Ligue 1	9	1	1	0	2 (Note: Appearance(s) in the Coupe de la Ligue) (Note: Appearance(s) in the Coupe de la Ligue)	0	12	1
Montpellier	2018–19	Ligue 1	12	0	1	0	1	0	14	0
Montpellier	2019–20	Ligue 1	7	0	0	0	1	0	8	0
Montpellier	2020–21	Ligue 1	20	0	3	0	—		23	0
Montpellier	2021–22	Ligue 1	34	2	3	0	—		37	2
Montpellier	2022–23	Ligue 1	17	2	1	0	—		18	2
Montpellier	Total		99	5	9	0	4	0	112	5
VfL Wolfsburg	2022–23	Bundesliga	5	0	1	0	—		6	0
VfL Wolfsburg	2023–24	Bundesliga	6	0	1	0	—		7	0
VfL Wolfsburg	Total		11	0	2	0	—		13	0
Nantes (loan)	2023–24	Ligue 1	13	0	0	0	—		13	0
Nantes (loan)	2024–25	Ligue 1	27	1	2	0	—		29	1
Nantes (loan)	2025–26	Ligue 1	28	0	2	0	—		30	0
Nantes (loan)	Total		55	1	4	0	—		59	1
Career total			200	6	15	0	4	0	219	6
