= Arnaud Nordin =

French footballer (born 1998)

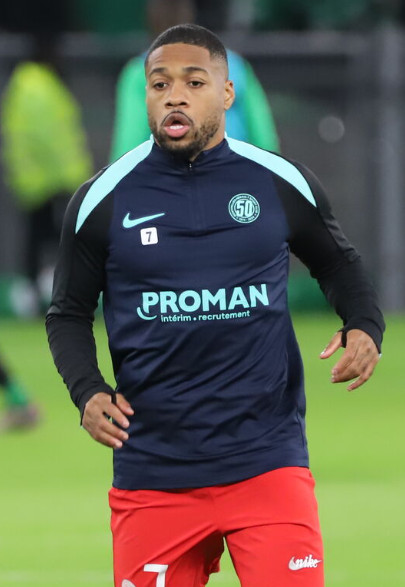
- Nordin with Montpellier in 2024

Personal information
- Full name: Arnaud Dominique Nordin
- Date of birth: 17 June 1998 (age 28)
- Place of birth: Paris, France
- Height: 1.70 m (5 ft 7 in)
- Positions: Forward; winger

Team information
- Current team: Rennes
- Number: 70

Youth career
- 2006–2011: FC Gobelins
- 2011–2013: Créteil
- 2013–2016: Saint-Étienne

Senior career*
Years	Team	Apps	(Gls)
2015–2019	Saint-Étienne B	34	(11)
2015–2022	Saint-Étienne	126	(14)
2017–2018	→ Nancy (loan)	27	(4)
2018	→ Nancy B (loan)	2	(0)
2022–2025	Montpellier	72	(18)
2025–2026	Mainz 05	20	(0)
2026	→ Rennes (loan)	10	(1)
2026–	Rennes	0	(0)

International career^{‡}
2013–2014	France U16	12	(8)
2016	France U18	3	(0)
2016–2017	France U19	4	(1)
2019–2020	France U21	7	(1)
2021	France Olympic	3	(0)
- * Club domestic league appearances and goals as of 19 May 2026 ‡ National team caps and goals as of 25 July 2021

Arnaud Dominique Nordin (born 17 June 1998) is a French professional footballer who plays as a forward or winger for Ligue 1 club Rennes.

== Club career ==
Nordin is a youth exponent from Saint-Étienne. He made his Ligue 1 debut on 25 September 2016 against Lille.

On 13 June 2022, Nordin signed a pre-contract agreement to join Ligue 1 side Montpellier upon the expiration of his Saint-Étienne contract on 1 July 2022. He chose the number 7 shirt at the club.

On 28 January 2025, Nordin moved to Germany and signed a three-and-a-half-year contract with Mainz 05. A transfer fee of €1 million was reported.

On 2 February 2026, Nordin returned to Ligue 1, joining Stade Rennais on loan from FSV Mainz 05 for the remainder of the season, after having struggled for consistent playing time in the Bundesliga.

== Personal life ==
Nordin was born in metropolitan France and is of Martiniquais and Malagasy descent.

== Career statistics ==
As of match played 17 May 2026

Appearances and goals by club, season and competition
Club	Season	League			National cup (Note: Includes Coupe de France)		League cup (Note: Includes Coupe de la Ligue)		Europe		Other		Total	
Club	Season	Division	Apps	Goals	Apps	Goals	Apps	Goals	Apps	Goals	Apps	Goals	Apps	Goals
Saint-Étienne B	2015–16	CFA 2	17	2	—		—		—		—		17	2
Saint-Étienne B	2016–17	CFA 2	13	5	—		—		—		—		13	5
Saint-Étienne B	2018–19	National 2	3	3	—		—		—		—		3	3
Saint-Étienne B	2019–20	National 2	1	1	—		—		—		—		1	1
Saint-Étienne B	Total		34	11	—		—		—		—		34	11
Saint-Étienne	2016–17	Ligue 1	15	2	1	0	1	0	2 (Note: Appearances in UEFA Europa League)	0	—		19	2
Saint-Étienne	2018–19	Ligue 1	25	3	1	0	1	0	—		—		27	3
Saint-Étienne	2019–20	Ligue 1	18	1	3	2	1	0	6	0	—		28	3
Saint-Étienne	2020–21	Ligue 1	32	4	1	0	—		—		—		33	4
Saint-Étienne	2021–22	Ligue 1	36	4	3	2	—		—		2 (Note: Appearances in Ligue 1 relegation/promotion play-offs)	0	41	6
Saint-Étienne	Total		126	14	9	4	3	0	8	0	2	0	148	18
Nancy (loan)	2017–18	Ligue 2	27	4	2	1	1	1	—		—		30	6
Nancy B (loan)	2017–18	National 3	2	0	—		—		—		—		2	0
Montpellier	2022–23	Ligue 1	36	9	1	0	—		—		—		37	9
Montpellier	2023–24	Ligue 1	20	5	1	0	—		—		—		21	5
Montpellier	2024–25	Ligue 1	16	4	1	0	—		—		—		17	4
Montpellier	Total		72	18	3	0	—		—		—		75	18
Mainz 05	2024–25	Bundesliga	6	0	—		—		—		—		6	0
Mainz 05	2025–26	Bundesliga	14	0	2	0	—		4 (Note: Appearances in UEFA Conference League)	0	—		20	0
Mainz 05	Total		20	0	2	0	—		4	0	—		26	0
Rennes (loan)	2025–26	Ligue 1	10	1	0	0	—		—		—		10	1
Rennes	2026–27	Ligue 1	0	0	0	0	—		—		—		0	0
Career total			291	48	16	5	4	1	12	0	2	0	325	54

== Honours ==
Saint-Étienne

- Coupe de France runner-up: 2019–20
