= Elye Wahi =

Ivorian footballer (born 2003)

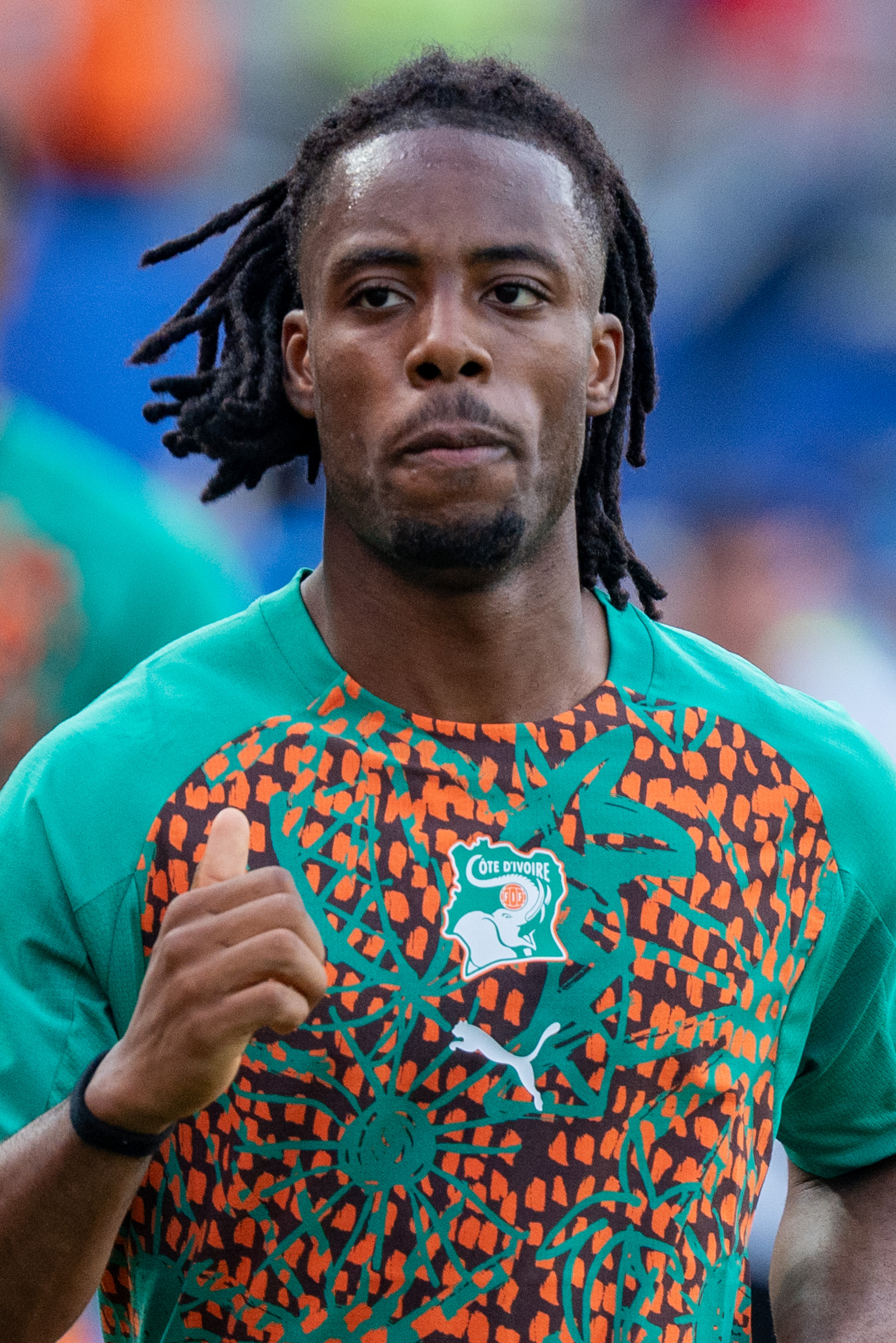
- Wahi with the Ivory Coast in 2026

Personal information
- Full name: Sepe Elye Delmas Wahi
- Date of birth: 2 January 2003 (age 23)
- Place of birth: Courcouronnes, Essonne, France
- Height: 1.82 m (6 ft 0 in)
- Position: Forward

Team information
- Current team: Nice (on loan from Eintracht Frankfurt)
- Number: 11

Youth career
- 2009–2016: Suresnes
- 2016–2018: Caen
- 2018: Montfermeil
- 2018–2020: Montpellier

Senior career*
Years	Team	Apps	(Gls)
2019–2020	Montpellier II	11	(3)
2020–2023	Montpellier	85	(32)
2023–2024	Lens	27	(9)
2024–2025	Marseille	13	(3)
2025–	Eintracht Frankfurt	18	(0)
2026–	→ Nice (loan)	22	(11)

International career^{‡}
2019	France U16	2	(0)
2019	France U17	1	(0)
2021–2022	France U19	10	(4)
2023	France U20	2	(0)
2022–2023	France U21	13	(3)
2024	France Olympic	2	(0)
2026–	Ivory Coast	9	(1)
- * Club domestic league appearances and goals as of 30 October 2026 ‡ National team caps and goals as of 12 November 2026

Sepe Elye Delmas Wahi (born 2 January 2003) is a professional footballer who plays as a forward for Ligue 1 club Nice, on loan from Bundesliga club Eintracht Frankfurt. Born in France, he plays for the Ivory Coast national team.

== Early life ==
Sepe Elye Delmas Wahi was born on 2 January 2003 in Courcouronnes, a commune in the southern suburbs of Paris in the French department of Essonne. He is of Ivorian descent.

Wahi's father died when he was two years old. He grew up with his mother Olga, his sister, and his stepfather Richmond.

== Club career ==
=== Caen ===
While a youth player at Caen, Wahi made headlines for scoring 89 goals in the 2016–17 season as an under-14 and under-15 player.

=== Montpellier ===
On 17 October 2019, Wahi signed his first professional contract with Montpellier. He made his professional debut in a 2–0 Ligue 1 loss to Metz on 16 December 2020.

Wahi scored his first goal for Montpellier in a 3–2 loss to Monaco on 15 January 2021. In doing so, he became the club's second-youngest ever goal scorer at the age of 18 years and 13 days. On 14 March 2022, Wahi signed a contract extension at Montpellier. On 29 December 2022, by scoring his twentieth career Ligue 1 goal in a 2–0 away win over Lorient, Wahi became only the second teenager after Kylian Mbappé to reach this milestone in the previous forty years. He quickly became the second youngest player in the history of Ligue 1 to reach the landmark of 25 goals in the competition. On 7 May 2023, he scored four goals in fifteen minutes for Montpellier in a 5–4 away defeat to Lyon.

=== Lens ===
On 20 August 2023, Wahi signed a five-year contract with Lens following a €35 million transfer from Montpellier. The deal became Lens's record arrival, Montpellier's record sale, and the second-biggest transfer between two Ligue 1 clubs. On the same day, he was presented to the Stade Bollaert-Delelis ahead of a match against Rennes, holding his new number 9 shirt. On 29 September, he scored his first goal at the club in a 1–0 away win over Strasbourg. On 3 October, he scored his first UEFA Champions League goal and provided an assist in a 2–1 home victory over Arsenal, winning the player of the match award.

=== Marseille ===
On 13 August 2024, Wahi joined fellow Ligue 1 club Marseille for a fee of €25 million, plus €5 million in potential bonuses. It was reported by the media, but not confirmed by the club, that he had signed a five-year contract.

=== Eintracht Frankfurt ===
On 24 January 2025, Wahi moved to Germany and signed a five-and-a-half-year contract with Eintracht Frankfurt.

==== Nice (loans) ====
On 1 January 2026, Wahi was loaned to Ligue 1 side Nice until the end of the season. Two days later, he netted a goal on his debut in a 1–1 draw with Strasbourg.

After spending the 2026–27 preseason with Eintracht, on 24 August 2026 Wahi returned to Nice on another loan, with an option to buy.

== International career ==
=== Youth ===
Wahi is a youth international for France. He had a single cap with France U17, where he played against Italy U17 on 3 December 2019. The match ended in a 1–1 draw.

With France U19, he scored a goal against England U19 on 6 October 2021, in a 3–1 win. He then also scored in the next game against Mexico U19, which ended in a 4–1 victory.

In September 2022, Wahi was called up for the first time with France U21 by manager Sylvain Ripoll. He went on to score his first goal on his second cap for the national side against Belgium U21.

=== Senior ===
On 28 March 2026, Wahi's request to switch allegiance to Ivory Coast was approved by FIFA.

On May 15, 2026, Wahi was integrated by Ivory Coast coach Emerse Faé in his list of 26 players in order to participate in the 2026 World Cup. After making his World Cup debut starting in a 1–0 win over Ecuador, he was denied a visa to Canada for the second match against Germany due to alleged involvement in a spot-fixing scandal earlier that year. He was later granted entry after officials confirmed he met the requirements for travel.

== Controversies ==
In March 2018, Elye Wahi was expelled from the Collège Jean-Moulin secondary school in partnership with Caen's youth academy. On 12 March 2018, the Collège had summoned Wahi's stepfather, his legal representative, to a disciplinary committee on the grounds that Wahi had committed the following actions: "Under the verbal threat of physical violence, [Wahi] ordered three of his classmates to follow him into the restrooms and forced them to undress." In November 2021, investigative reporter Romain Molina alleged that Wahi had pressured the three students to masturbate in front of him.

In October 2021, a 22-year-old woman filed a legal complaint against Wahi for violence that resulted in her being incapable to work. She claimed that he had punched her in the nose during an evening out at the L'Entrepôt nightclub in Lattes, Hérault, on the night of 12–13 September a month earlier. The woman received treatment from emergency services for her injuries. Wahi's entourage denied the allegations, and the case was eventually closed without further action.

In June 2026, The Athletic reported Wahi had been arrested by French police in May over alleged fixing offences.

== Career statistics ==
=== Club ===
As of match played 30 October 2026

Appearances and goals by club, season and competition
Club	Season	League			National cup (Note: Includes Coupe de France, DFB-Pokal)		Europe		Other		Total	
Club	Season	Division	Apps	Goals	Apps	Goals	Apps	Goals	Apps	Goals	Apps	Goals
Montpellier II	2018–19	Championnat National 3	1	0	—		—		—		1	0
Montpellier II	2019–20	Championnat National 2	7	1	—		—		—		7	1
Montpellier II	2020–21	Championnat National 3	3	2	—		—		—		3	2
Montpellier II	Total		11	3	—		—		—		11	3
Montpellier	2020–21	Ligue 1	18	3	4	0	—		—		22	3
Montpellier	2021–22	Ligue 1	33	10	3	0	—		—		36	10
Montpellier	2022–23	Ligue 1	33	19	0	0	—		—		33	19
Montpellier	2023–24	Ligue 1	1	0	—		—		—		1	0
Montpellier	Total		85	32	7	0	—		—		92	32
Lens	2023–24	Ligue 1	27	9	1	0	8 (Note: Six appearances and two goals in UEFA Champions League, two appearances and one goal in UEFA Europa League)	3	—		36	12
Marseille	2024–25	Ligue 1	13	3	1	0	—		—		14	3
Eintracht Frankfurt	2024–25	Bundesliga	8	0	—		3 (Note: Appearances in UEFA Europa League)	0	—		11	0
Eintracht Frankfurt	2025–26	Bundesliga	10	0	1	1	3 (Note: Appearances in UEFA Champions League)	0	—		14	1
Eintracht Frankfurt	Total		18	0	1	1	6	0	—		25	1
Nice (loan)	2025–26	Ligue 1	14	5	4	2	—		1 (Note: Appearance in Ligue 1 relegation/promotion play-offs)	2	19	9
Nice (loan)	2026–27	Ligue 1	8	6	0	0	—		—		8	6
Nice (loan)	Total		22	11	4	2	—		1	2	27	15
Career total			176	58	14	3	14	3	1	2	205	66

=== International ===
As of match played 12 November 2026

Appearances and goals by national team and year
National team	Year	Apps	Goals
Ivory Coast	2026	9	1
Total		9	1

Scores and results list Ivory Coast's goal tally first, score column indicates score after each Wahi goal.

List of international goals scored by Elye Wahi
No.	Date	Venue	Opponent	Score	Result	Competition
1	12 November 2026	Bouaké Stadium, Bouaké, Ivory Coast	Gambia	2–0	2–1	2027 Africa Cup of Nations qualification

== Honours ==
Nice

- Coupe de France runner-up: 2025–26

Individual

- Ligue 1 Goal of the Year: 2022–23
