= Maxime Estève =

French footballer (born 2002)

- Estève with Burnley in 2026

Personal information
- Full name: Maxime Fernand Christian Estève
- Date of birth: 26 May 2002 (age 24)
- Place of birth: Montpellier, France
- Height: 1.93 m (6 ft 4 in)
- Position: Centre-back

Team information
- Current team: RB Leipzig
- Number: 3

Youth career
- 2009–2010: Olympique Saint-Andréen
- 2010–2013: Canet Roussillon
- 2013–2020: Montpellier

Senior career*
Years	Team	Apps	(Gls)
2020–2021	Montpellier II	11	(1)
2021–2024	Montpellier	59	(1)
2023–2024	→ Burnley (loan)	16	(0)
2024–2026	Burnley	80	(1)
2026–	RB Leipzig	5	(0)

International career
2021–2022	France U20	7	(0)
2023–2024	France U21	2	(0)
2024–2025	France Olympic	1	(0)
- * Club domestic league appearances and goals as of 17:28, 24 October 2026 (UTC)

Maxime Fernand Christian Estève (French pronunciation: [maksim ɛːtəiv]; born 26 May 2002) is a French professional footballer who plays as a centre-back for Bundesliga club RB Leipzig.

== Club career ==
=== Montpellier ===
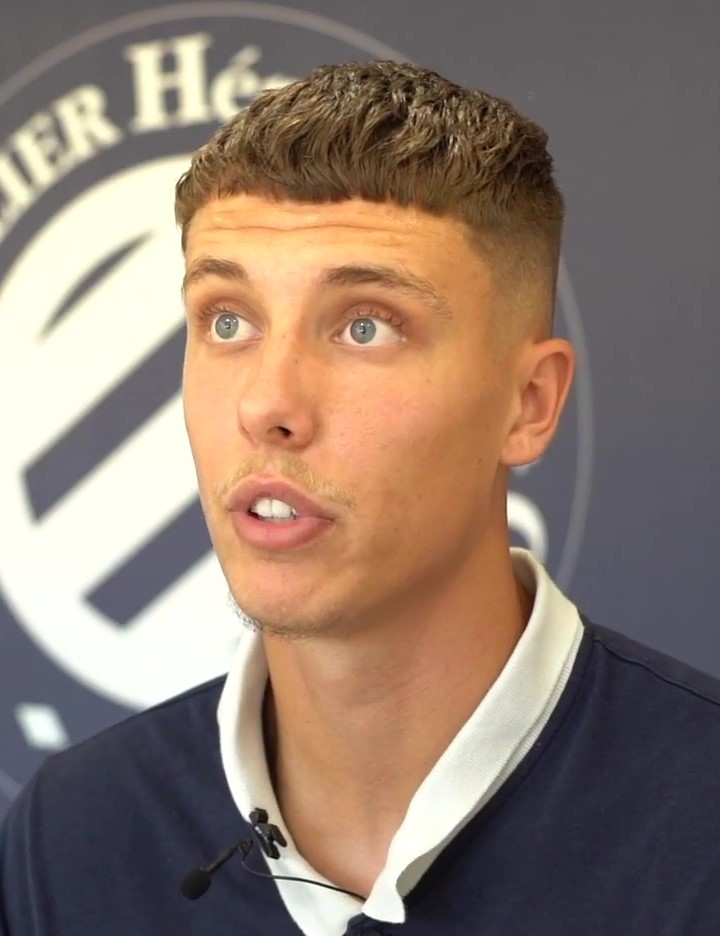
Estève in 2021

Estève signed his first aspirant contract with Montpellier on 19 November 2019. He made his professional debut with Montpellier in a 3–2 Ligue 1 loss to Marseille on 8 August 2021. On 23 September 2021, he signed his first professional contract with the club.

=== Burnley ===
Estève warming up for Burnley in 2025

On 1 February 2024, Estève was loaned out to English side Burnley until the end of the season with an option to buy. On 21 May 2024, Burnley said the loan had been made permanent.

=== RB Leipzig ===
On 17 July 2026, Estève signed for RB Leipzig on a five-year deal.

== International career ==
Estève is a youth international for France, having played for the France U20s. After some injuries in his position at club level with Burnley, he took the decision himself to withdraw from the French 2024 Summer Olympics squad, and was replaced by Loïc Badé.

== Personal life ==
Estève was colloquially known as "Max" by Burnley fans.

== Career statistics ==
As of match played 8 November 2026

Appearances and goals by club, season and competition
Club	Season	League			National cup (Note: Includes Coupe de France, FA Cup)		League cup		Europe		Total	
Club	Season	Division	Apps	Goals	Apps	Goals	Apps	Goals	Apps	Goals	Apps	Goals
Montpellier	2020–21	Ligue 1	0	0	0	0	—		—		0	0
Montpellier	2021–22	Ligue 1	24	0	0	0	—		—		24	0
Montpellier	2022–23	Ligue 1	23	0	1	0	—		—		24	0
Montpellier	2023–24	Ligue 1	12	1	2	0	—		—		14	1
Montpellier	Total		59	1	3	0	—		—		62	1
Burnley (loan)	2023–24	Premier League	16	0	—		—		—		16	0
Burnley	2024–25	Championship	46	1	2	0	0	0	—		48	1
Burnley	2025–26	Premier League	34	0	2	0	0	0	—		36	0
Burnley	Total		96	1	4	0	0	0	—		100	1
RB Leipzig	2026–27	Bundesliga	5	0	0	0	—		0	0	5	0
Career total			160	2	7	0	0	0	0	0	167	2

== Honours ==
Individual

- EFL Championship Team of the Season: 2024–25
- PFA Team of the Year: 2024–25 Championship
