= Jonas Omlin =

Swiss footballer (born 1994)

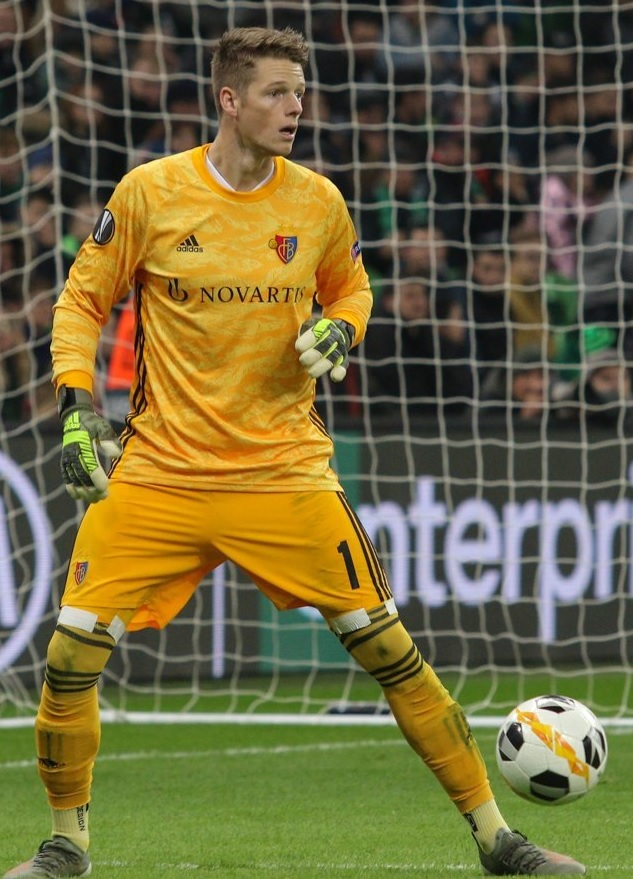
- Omlin playing for Basel in 2019

Personal information
- Full name: Jonas Omlin
- Date of birth: 10 January 1994 (age 32)
- Place of birth: Sarnen, Switzerland
- Height: 1.90 m (6 ft 3 in)
- Position: Goalkeeper

Team information
- Current team: Basel
- Number: 1

Senior career*
Years	Team	Apps	(Gls)
2012–2014	Kriens	26	(0)
2014–2018	Luzern	51	(0)
2015–2016	→ Le Mont (loan)	15	(0)
2018–2020	Basel	59	(0)
2020–2023	Montpellier	74	(0)
2023–2026	Borussia Mönchengladbach	34	(0)
2026	→ Bayer Leverkusen (loan)	0	(0)
2026–	Basel	2	(0)

International career^{‡}
2020–2022	Switzerland	4	(0)
- * Club domestic league appearances and goals as of 28 September 2026 ‡ National team caps and goals as of 12 June 2022 (UTC)

Jonas Omlin (born 10 January 1994) is a Swiss professional footballer who plays as a goalkeeper for Swiss Super League club Basel.

== Club career ==
Omlin played for Kriens in the 1. Liga Promotion. He moved on to Luzern, but was loaned out to Le Mont-sur-Lausanne for the 2015/16 season. He returned to Luzern for two seasons.

FC Basel announced on 22 June 2018 that they had signed goalkeeper Omlin from Luzern. After five test games, Omlin played his domestic league debut for his new club in the home game at the St. Jakob-Park on 21 July 2018 as Basel were defeated 2–1 by St. Gallen.

Under trainer Marcel Koller, Basel won the Swiss Cup in the 2018–19 season. In the first round Basel beat FC Montlingen 3–0, in the second round Echallens Région 7–2 and in the round of 16 Winterthur 1–0. In the quarter-finals Sion were defeated 4–2 after extra time and in the semi-finals Zürich were defeated 3–1. All these games were played away from home. The final was held on 19 May 2019 in the Stade de Suisse Wankdorf Bern against Thun. Striker Albian Ajeti scored the first goal, Fabian Frei the second for Basel, then Dejan Sorgić netted a goal for Thun, but the result was 2–1 for Basel. Omlin played in four cup games. On 12 August 2020, the club announced that Omlin had transferred to Montpellier as of straight away. In his two seasons with the club Omlin played a total of 92 games for Basel. 59 of these games were in the Nationalliga A, five in the Swiss Cup, six in the Champions League, nine in the UEFA Europa League and 13 were friendly games.

On 12 August 2020, Omlin signed for French Ligue 1 side Montpellier.

On 19 January 2023, Omlin signed for Bundesliga club Borussia Mönchengladbach on a four-and-a-half-year deal.

On 27 January 2026, Omlin signed for fellow Bundesliga side Bayer Leverkusen on loan until the end of the season.

On 5 June 2026, Swiss Super League club FC Basel announced the return of Omlin on a three year deal.

== International career ==
In May 2019, he was named to the national team for the 2018–19 UEFA Nations League final matches but did not appear in the tournament.

He made his national team debut on 7 October 2020 in a friendly against Croatia.

=== Euro 2020 ===
Originally called up to the Swiss squad for the Euro 2020, Omlin suffered a minor injury to his right ankle during the warm-up of the opening game. The Swiss Football Association called up Gregor Kobel to replace his position.

=== 2022 World Cup ===
In November 2022, Omlin was named in the Swiss squad for the 2022 FIFA World Cup held in Qatar. He was an unused substitute for all matches.

== Career statistics ==
=== Club ===
As of match played 17 May 2025

Appearances and goals by club, season and competition
Club	Season	League			National cup		Europe		Other		Total	
Club	Season	Division	Apps	Goals	Apps	Goals	Apps	Goals	Apps	Goals	Apps	Goals
Kriens	2012–13	1. Liga Promotion	4	0	—		—		—		4	0
Kriens	2013–14	1. Liga Promotion	22	0	2	0	—		—		24	0
Kriens	Total		26	0	2	0	—		—		28	0
Luzern	2014–15	Swiss Super League	1	0	0	0	—		—		1	0
Luzern	2016–17	Swiss Super League	14	0	5	0	0	0	—		19	0
Luzern	2017–18	Swiss Super League	36	0	2	0	2	0	—		40	0
Luzern	Total		51	0	7	0	2	0	—		60	0
Le Mont (loan)	2015–16	Swiss Challenge League	15	0	0	0	—		—		15	0
Basel	2018–19	Swiss Super League	27	0	4	0	4	0	—		35	0
Basel	2019–20	Swiss Super League	32	0	1	0	11	0	—		44	0
Basel	Total		59	0	5	0	15	0	—		79	0
Montpellier	2020–21	Ligue 1	31	0	0	0	—		—		31	0
Montpellier	2021–22	Ligue 1	29	0	0	0	—		—		29	0
Montpellier	2022–23	Ligue 1	14	0	0	0	—		—		14	0
Montpellier	Total		74	0	0	0	—		—		74	0
Borussia Mönchengladbach	2022–23	Bundesliga	15	0	—		—		—		15	0
Borussia Mönchengladbach	2023–24	Bundesliga	7	0	1	0	—		—		8	0
Borussia Mönchengladbach	2024–25	Bundesliga	12	0	1	0	—		—		13	0
Borussia Mönchengladbach	2025–26	Bundesliga	0	0	0	0	—		—		0	0
Borussia Mönchengladbach	Total		34	0	2	0	—		—		36	0
Basel	2026–27	Swiss Super League	0	0	0	0	0	0	—		0	0
Career total			259	0	16	0	17	0	0	0	292	0

=== International ===
As of match played 12 June 2022

Appearances and goals by national team and year
National team	Year	Apps	Goals
Switzerland	2020	1	0
Switzerland	2021	1	0
Switzerland	2022	2	0
Total		4	0

== Honours ==
Basel

- Swiss Cup: 2018–19

=== Individual ===
- Swiss Super League Team of the Year: 2018–19, 2019–20,
