= Matheus Thuler =

Brazilian footballer (born 1999)

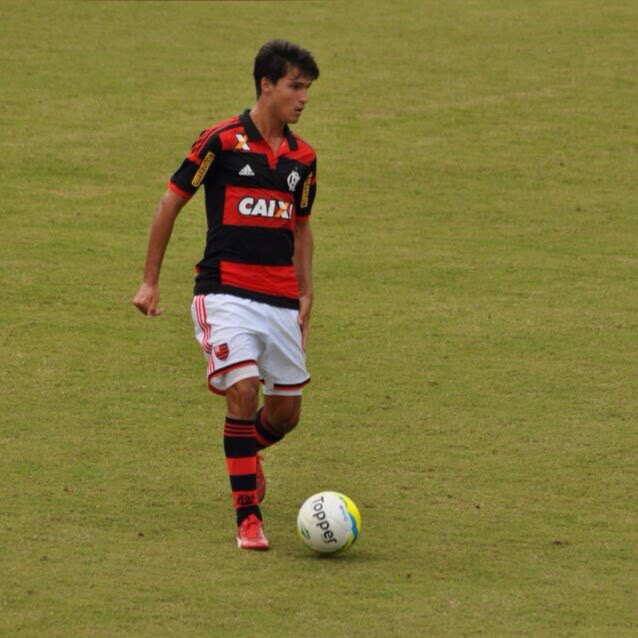
- Thuler with Flamengo in 2015

Personal information
- Full name: Matheus Soares Thuler
- Date of birth: 10 March 1999 (age 27)
- Place of birth: Rio de Janeiro, Brazil
- Height: 1.87 m (6 ft 2 in)
- Position: Centre-back

Team information
- Current team: Vissel Kobe
- Number: 3

Youth career
- 2009–2018: Flamengo

Senior career*
Years	Team	Apps	(Gls)
2017–2022	Flamengo	34	(1)
2021–2022	→ Montpellier (loan)	16	(0)
2022	→ Vissel Kobe (loan)	7	(0)
2023–	Vissel Kobe	112	(8)

International career
2018–2019	Brazil U20	2	(0)
- * Club domestic league appearances and goals as of 30 May 2026

Matheus Soares Thuler (born 10 March 1999) is a Brazilian professional footballer who plays as a centre-back for Japanese club Vissel Kobe.

== Club career ==
=== Early career ===
Thuler started his youth career at Flamengo and was the team captain for the winning side in the Copa São Paulo de Futebol Júnior in 2018.

=== Flamengo ===
Despite still playing for the under-20 team, Thuler debuted for Flamengo in 30 August 2017 in a Primeira Liga match against Paraná in a match were Flamengo fielded reserves and youngsters.

In 2018, after a strong performance at Copa São Paulo de Futebol Júnior Thuler was promoted to the professional team. He played a total of five matches at Rio de Janeiro State League when Flamengo rotated the roster. On 26 May 2018, he debuted in a Brazilian Série A match against Atlético Mineiro at Estádio Independência, he played alongside his former under-20 partner Léo Duarte due to injuries of Juan, Réver and Rhodolfo, Flamengo won that match 1–0. Thuler kept his partnership with Duarte for another four matches until the league break for the 2018 FIFA World Cup, on the last of this five-match run he scored his first goal in a 1–1 draw against Palmeiras at Allianz Parque.

On 17 July 2018, Thuler extended his contract with Flamengo until July 2023. On 28 August 2020, he extended his contract with Flamengo until December 2024.

==== Loan to Montpellier ====
On 25 June 2021, Thuler signed for Ligue 1 club Montpellier on loan until the end of the 2021–22 season.

=== Vissel Kobe ===
On 1 August 2022, Thuler signed for J1 League club Vissel Kobe on loan until the end of the 2022 season. On 4 January 2023, it was announced that he would be permanently transferred to Vissel Kobe.

== International career ==
On 12 June 2018, Thuler was called up to the Brazil U20s for an early period of training ahead of the 2019 South American U-20 Championship.

== Career statistics ==
As of match played 30 May 2026

Appearances and goals by club, season and competition
Club	Season	League			State league		National cup		League cup		Continental		Other		Total	
Club	Season	Division	Apps	Goals	Apps	Goals	Apps	Goals	Apps	Goals	Apps	Goals	Apps	Goals	Apps	Goals
Flamengo	2017	Série A	0	0	1 (Note: Appearances in Campeonato Carioca)	0	—		—		—		1 (Note: Appearances in Primeira Liga)	0	2	0
Flamengo	2018	Série A	7	1	5	0	0	0	—		0	0	—		12	1
Flamengo	2019	Série A	13	0	3	0	0	0	—		1 (Note: appearances in Copa Libertadores)	0	—		17	0
Flamengo	2020	Série A	4	0	2	0	2	0	—		3	1	1 (Note: Appearances in Recopa Sudamericana)	0	12	1
Flamengo	Total		24	1	11	0	2	0	—		4	1	2	0	43	2
Montpellier (loan)	2021–22	Ligue 1	16	0	—		2	0	—		—		—		18	0
Vissel Kobe (loan)	2022	J1 League	7	0	—		0	0	1	0	2 (Note: Appearances in AFC Champions League Elite)	0	—		10	0
Vissel Kobe	2023	J1 League	27	2	—		2	0	1	0	—		—		30	2
Vissel Kobe	2024	J1 League	36	2	—		2	0	0	0	4	0	1 (Note: Appearances in Japanese Super Cup)	0	43	2
Vissel Kobe	2025	J1 League	32	2	—		2	0	1	0	6	0	0	0	41	2
Vissel Kobe	2026	J1 League	17	2	—		—		—		5	1	—		22	3
Vissel Kobe	Vissel Kobe total		119	8	—		6	0	3	0	17	1	1	0	146	9
Career total			159	9	11	0	10	0	3	0	21	2	3	0	207	11

== Honours ==
Flamengo

- Copa Libertadores: 2019
- Recopa Sudamericana: 2020
- Campeonato Brasileiro Série A: 2019, 2020
- Supercopa do Brasil: 2020
- Campeonato Carioca: 2019, 2020

Vissel Kobe

- J1 League: 2023, 2024
- Emperor's Cup: 2024
- J1 100 Year Vision League: 2026

Individual

- J.League Best XI: 2024
- J1 100 Year Vision League Regional Round West Best Eleven: 2026
