= Arnaud Souquet =

French footballer (born 1992)

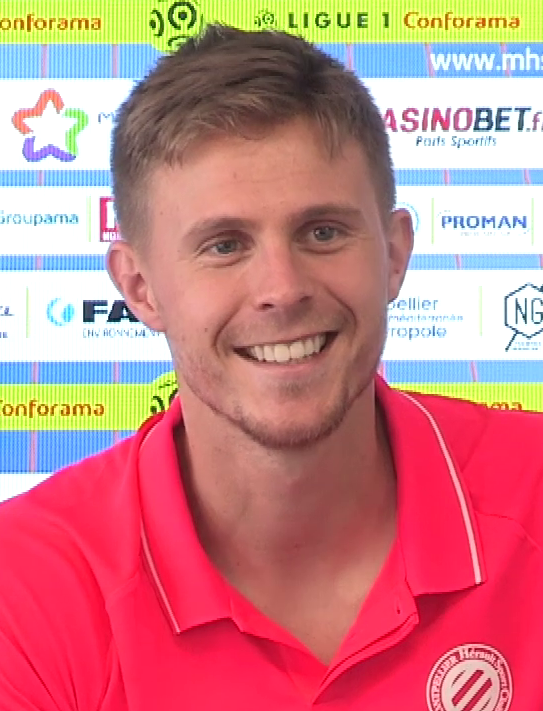
- Souquet with Montpellier in 2019

Personal information
- Date of birth: 12 February 1992 (age 34)
- Place of birth: Paris, France
- Height: 1.79 m (5 ft 10 in)
- Position: Defender

Youth career
- 2001–2007: CO Vincennois
- 2007–2010: Lille

Senior career*
Years	Team	Apps	(Gls)
2009–2014	Lille	1	(0)
2011–2012	→ Paris FC (loan)	33	(1)
2012–2013	→ Mouscron-Péruwelz (loan)	13	(0)
2014	JA Drancy	2	(1)
2014–2015	Poiré-sur-Vie	21	(0)
2015–2016	Dijon	27	(0)
2016–2018	Nice	55	(1)
2018–2019	Gent	31	(0)
2019–2023	Montpellier	93	(4)
2023–2024	Chicago Fire	51	(0)
2024	Chicago Fire II	1	(0)

International career^{‡}
2007–2008	France U16	6	(0)
2008–2009	France U17	15	(2)
2009–2010	France U18	6	(0)
2011–2012	France U20	5	(0)
- * Club domestic league appearances and goals as of 26 October 2024 ‡ National team caps and goals as of 1 June 2012

Arnaud Souquet (born 12 February 1992) is a French professional footballer. He primarily plays as a right-back, but has also been utitilized as a central defender and as a defensive midfielder. Souquet is a France youth international having earned caps with both the under-16s and the under-17 team, whom he played with at the 2009 UEFA European Under-17 Football Championship.

== Club career ==
=== Youth ===
Souquet was born in Paris and began his career playing for CO Vincennois, the same club that produced the likes of Blaise Matuidi and Yacine Brahimi. While attending the Vincennes-based club, Souquet had the opportunity to join both the famous Clairefontaine academy and the Parisian giants Paris Saint-Germain. However, he declined the chance and after his father met with then-president Alain Cayzac of the latter, he declined that chance, as well.

=== Lille ===
Souquet joined Lille in 2007 as a youth player after the club spotted him while playing with Vincennes. After excelling in the club's youth system and internationally, for the 2008–09 season, he was promoted to the club's Championnat de France amateur team, despite being only 16 years old at the time. He made his debut with the reserves in their 1–5 defeat to AS Nancy reserves on 14 September 2008. Over the course of the season, he made 12 appearances, which included nine starts. Following the season, on 17 July 2009, Souquet signed his first professional contract agreeing to a three-year deal.

After starting the season with the club's Championnat de France amateur team, on 30 September 2009, due to injuries to midfielders Florent Balmont and Ludovic Obraniak, manager Rudi Garcia announced that Souquet would be included in the team for the club's match against Czech club Slavia Prague in the UEFA Europa League. Souquet was assigned the number 35 shirt and made his professional debut, as a starter, playing the entire 90 minutes. In the match, which Lille won 5–1, Souquet scored his first professional goal in the 88th minute and also assisted on a goal scored by Pierre-Alain Frau. On 17 October, he made his league debut starting in the club's match against Rennes. The match ended 0–0 with Souquet only playing the first half.

=== Nice ===
On 25 July 2016, Ligue 1 side Nice reached an agreement with Dijon for the transfer of Souquet.

=== Gent ===
On 31 August 2018, the last day of the 2018 summer transfer window, Souquet joined Belgian First Division A side K.A.A. Gent on a four-year contract. The transfer fee was reported as €3 million.

=== Montpellier ===
On 6 August 2019, Souquet joined Montpellier HSC.

=== Chicago Fire ===
On 9 January 2023, Souquet moved to Major League Soccer side Chicago Fire on a 3-year deal. On 13 February 2025, Souquet was released by Chicago Fire.

== International career ==
Souquet has played with both the under-16s and the under-17 team. He was a regular in the under-17s during the run up to the 2009 UEFA European Under-17 Football Championship. During the qualification process, he scored goals against Scotland and Denmark. The 1–0 victory over Denmark assured progression to the tournament, where France were eliminated in the group stages. In total with the under-17s, Souquet made 15 appearances and scored two goals.
