= Gabriel Barès =

Swiss footballer (born 2000)

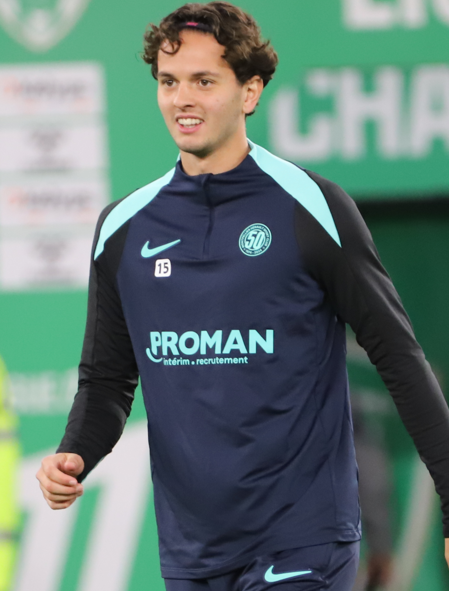
- Barès with Montpellier in 2024

Personal information
- Full name: Gabriel Julien Dominique Barès
- Date of birth: 29 August 2000 (age 26)
- Place of birth: Lausanne, Switzerland
- Height: 1.87 m (6 ft 2 in)
- Position: Midfielder

Youth career
- 2010–2016: Lausanne-Sport

Senior career*
Years	Team	Apps	(Gls)
2016–2017	Team Vaud U21	5	(0)
2017–2022	Lausanne-Sport	57	(0)
2022–2025	Montpellier B	10	(0)
2022–2025	Montpellier	6	(0)
2022–2023	→ Thun (loan)	26	(0)
2023–2024	→ Concarneau (loan)	26	(0)
2025	Burgos	4	(0)
2025–2026	Eupen	25	(0)

International career
2019	Switzerland U20	7	(0)
2021–2022	Switzerland U21	9	(2)
- * Club domestic league appearances and goals as of 20 April 2026

Gabriel Julien Dominique Barès (born 29 August 2000) is a Swiss professional footballer who plays as a midfielder.

== Club career ==
Barès made his professional debut with Lausanne-Sport in a 2–1 Swiss Super League win over Servette on 20 September 2020.

On 25 January 2022, Barès joined Montpellier in France. On 27 July 2022, he returned to Switzerland and joined Thun on loan.

On 3 February 2025, Barès moved to Spain and joined Segunda División side Burgos on an 18-month contract.

On 29 August 2025, Barès signed one-season contract with Eupen in the Belgian second tier.
