= Thibault Tamas =

French footballer (born 2001)

Personal information
- Date of birth: 20 February 2001 (age 25)
- Place of birth: Colombes, France
- Height: 1.78 m (5 ft 10 in)
- Position: Left-back

Team information
- Current team: Stade Beaucairois

Youth career
- 2007–2014: Stade Beaucairois
- 2014–2018: Montpellier

Senior career*
Years	Team	Apps	(Gls)
2018–2023	Montpellier II	39	(3)
2023	Montpellier	1	(0)
2023–2024	Stade Briochin	7	(0)
2023–2024	Stade Briochin II	12	(1)
2024–	Stade Beaucairois	4	(1)

International career^{‡}
2018	France U17	3	(0)
2019	France U18	1	(0)
2019	France U19	1	(0)
- * Club domestic league appearances and goals as of 20 September 2024 ‡ National team caps and goals as of 00:58, 9 June 2023 (UTC)

Thibault Tamas (born 20 February 2001) is a French professional footballer who plays as a left-back for Championnat National 3 club Stade Beaucairois.

== Career ==
Tamas is a youth product of Stade Beaucairois and Montpellier, and signed his first professional contract with the latter on 27 September 2019. He made his senior and professional debut with Montpellier as a late substitute in a 3–1 Ligue 1 win over Reims on 3 June 2023.

== International career ==
Tamas is a youth international for France, having played up to the France U19s.

== Personal life ==
Born in Metropolitan France, Tamas is of Guadeloupean descent. In August 2020, Tamas caught COVID-19 during the COVID pandemic and had to be isolated at home while recovering.
