= Sacha Delaye =

French footballer (born 2002)

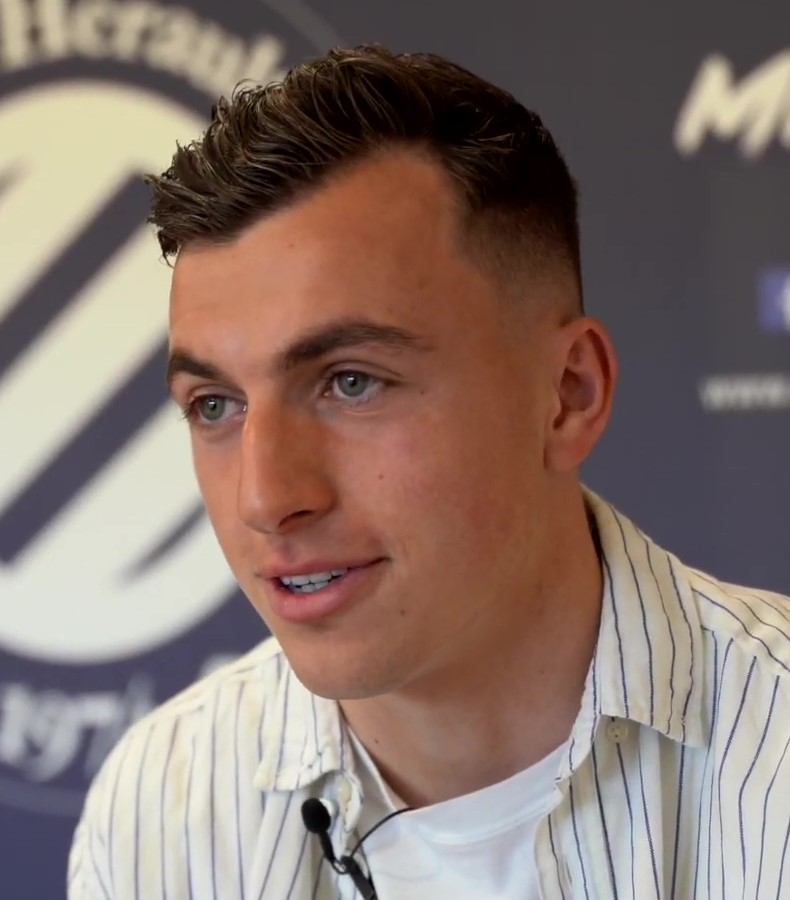
- Delaye with Montpellier in 2022

Personal information
- Date of birth: 23 April 2002 (age 24)
- Place of birth: Rennes, France
- Height: 1.71 m (5 ft 7 in)
- Position: Midfielder

Team information
- Current team: Austria Lustenau
- Number: 19

Youth career
- 2007–2021: Montpellier

Senior career*
Years	Team	Apps	(Gls)
2019–2024	Montpellier B	25	(4)
2021–2024	Montpellier	23	(1)
2023	→ Le Puy (loan)	13	(0)
2024–	Austria Lustenau	45	(3)
- * Club domestic league appearances and goals as of 17 May 2026

Sacha Delaye (born 23 April 2002) is a French professional footballer who plays as a midfielder for 2. Liga club Austria Lustenau.

== Career ==
Delaye is a youth product of Montpellier. He made his professional debut with the club in a 2–1 Ligue 1 win over Nantes on 23 May 2021. On 10 January 2023, Delaye joined Championnat National club Le Puy on loan for the rest of the season.

In July 2024, Delaye joined Austrian 2. Liga club Austria Lustenua on a two-year contract.

== Personal life ==
Delaye is the son of Philippe Delaye, who was also a professional footballer and played for Montpellier.
