= Matis Carvalho =

French footballer (born 1999)

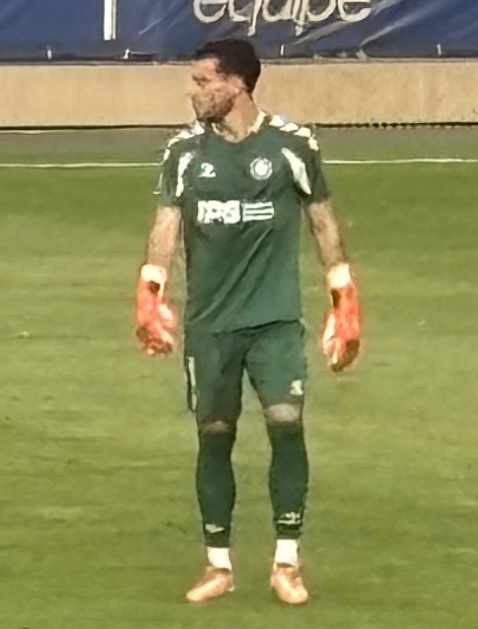
- Carvalho with Le Puy-en-Velay in August 2026

Personal information
- Date of birth: 28 April 1999 (age 27)
- Place of birth: Nantes, France
- Height: 1.86 m (6 ft 1 in)
- Position: Goalkeeper

Team information
- Current team: Le Puy
- Number: 30

Youth career
- 2014–2018: Toulouse

Senior career*
Years	Team	Apps	(Gls)
2018–2019	Toulouse II	18	(0)
2019–2023	Montpellier II	42	(0)
2020–2023	Montpellier	3	(0)
2023–	Le Puy	80	(0)
- * Club domestic league appearances and goals as of 23 June 2026

Matis Carvalho (born 28 April 1999) is a French professional footballer who plays as a goalkeeper for Ligue 3 club Le Puy.

== Career ==
On 19 June 2019, Carvalho signed his first professional contract with Montpellier HSC. He made his professional debut with Montpellier in a 5–0 Ligue 1 loss to Paris Saint-Germain on 1 February 2020.

== Personal life ==
Born in France, Carvalho is of Portuguese descent.

== Honours ==
Le Puy

- Championnat National 2: 2024–25
