= Yanis Guermouche =

Footballer (born 2001)

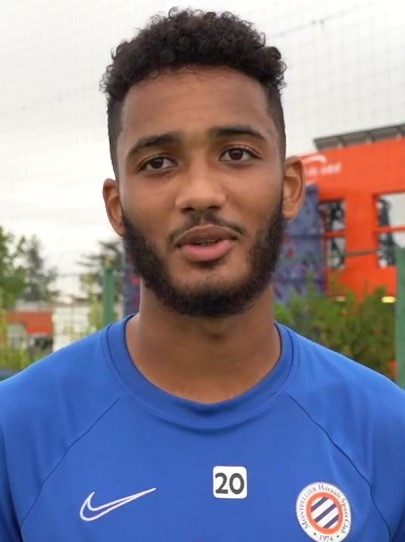
- Guermouche with Montpellier in 2021

Personal information
- Date of birth: 15 April 2001 (age 25)
- Place of birth: Neuilly-sur-Seine, France
- Height: 1.92 m (6 ft 4 in)
- Position: Forward

Team information
- Current team: FC Wacker Innsbruck
- Number: 99

Youth career
- 2004–2012: Montpellier
- 2012–2015: AS Lattes
- 2015–2017: US Mauguio
- 2017–2019: ASPTT Montpellier

Senior career*
| Years | Team | Apps | (Gls) |
| 2019–2024 | Montpellier B | 30 | (9) |
| 2021–2024 | Montpellier | 3 | (0) |
| 2022–2023 | → Châteauroux (loan) | 11 | (0) |
| 2022–2023 | → Châteauroux B (loan) | 2 | (0) |
| 2024 | Iraklis | 12 | (2) |
| 2024 | Krumovgrad | 10 | (0) |
| 2025 | Hebar | 15 | (2) |
| 2025– | Slavia Sofia | 33 | (6) |

International career^{‡}
| 2022 | Algeria U23 | 4 | (1) |
- * Club domestic league appearances and goals as of 11 June 2026 ‡ National team caps and goals as of 21:53, 2 June 2022 (UTC)

Yanis Guermouche (born 15 April 2001) is a professional footballer who plays as a forward for 2. Liga club FC Wacker Innsbruck. Born in France, he has represented Algeria at youth level.

== Club career ==
Guermouche signed his first professional contract with Montpellier on 10 June 2021. He made his professional debut with Montpellier in a 2-0 Ligue 1 win over Saint-Étienne on 15 January 2022.

On 18 July 2022, Guermouche was loaned to Châteauroux, a French third-tier Championnat National club. He returned to Montpellier in January 2023.

Guermouche left Montpellier by mutual consent on 30 January 2024.

On 1 February 2024, Guermouche signed with Iraklis in Greece.

== International career ==
Born in France, Guermouche is of Algerian descent. He was called up to represent the Algeria U23s at the 2022 Maurice Revello Tournament.
