= Clément Vidal =

French footballer (born 2000)

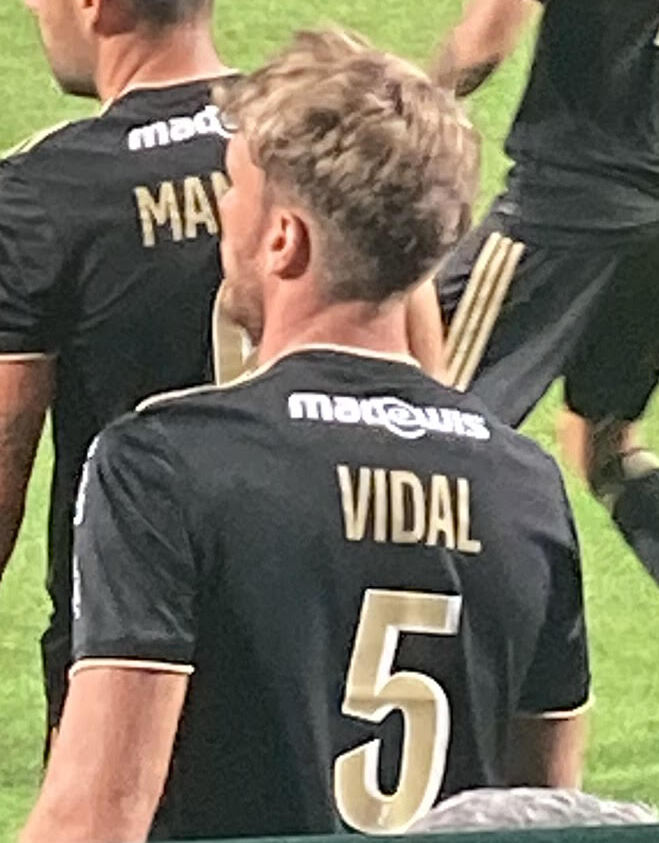
- Vidal with Ajaccio in 2024

Personal information
- Date of birth: 18 June 2000 (age 26)
- Place of birth: Montpellier, France
- Height: 1.81 m (5 ft 11 in)
- Position: Centre-back

Team information
- Current team: Grenoble
- Number: 5

Youth career
- 2006–2008: Pujaulaise
- 2008–2011: Villeneuve
- 2011–2014: SC Orange
- 2014–2019: Montpellier

Senior career*
Years	Team	Apps	(Gls)
2017–2020	Montpellier B	44	(3)
2019–2022	Montpellier	3	(0)
2021–2022	→ Ajaccio (loan)	28	(0)
2021	→ Ajaccio B (loan)	3	(0)
2022–2025	Ajaccio	81	(2)
2022–2024	Ajaccio B	3	(0)
2025–	Grenoble	26	(1)

International career
2016	France U16	2	(0)
2018	France U18	1	(0)
- * Club domestic league appearances and goals as of 12 May 2026

Clément Vidal (born 18 June 2000) is a French professional footballer who plays as a centre-back for Ligue 2 club Grenoble.

== Club career ==
Vidal played youth football for SC Orange. In November 2017, he signed a professional contract with Montpellier. He made his professional debut with the club on 4 December 2019 in a 2–2 draw away to Dijon.

On 1 July 2022, Vidal permanently signed for Ajaccio following a loan spell at the club.

On 1 September 2025, Vidal signed with Grenoble in Ligue 2.
