= 2018–19 Montpellier HSC season =

44th Montpellier HSC season

Montpellier
2018–19 season
- Chairman: Laurent Nicollin
- Manager: Michel Der Zakarian
- Stadium: Stade de la Mosson
- Ligue 1: 6th
- Coupe de France: Round of 64
- Coupe de la Ligue: Round of 16
- Top goalscorer: League: Andy Delort (14); All: Andy Delort (14)
- Highest home attendance: League/All: 20,477 vs. PSG (30 April 2019)
- Lowest home attendance: League: 10,630 vs. Strasbourg (15 September 2018); All: 6,774 vs. Nantes (30 October 2018, CdlL Ro32)
- Average home league attendance: 13,829
- Biggest win: 3–0 (30 September 2018 vs. Nîmes) (27 October 2018 at Toulouse) (4 November 2018 vs. Marseille)
- Biggest defeat: 1–5 (20 February 2019 at PSG)
Home colours	Away colours	Third colours

The 2018–19 Montpellier HSC season was the 44th professional season of the club since its creation in 1974.

== Players ==
French teams are limited to four players without EU citizenship. Hence, the squad list includes only the principal nationality of each player; several non-European players on the squad have dual citizenship with an EU country. Also, players from the ACP countries—countries in Africa, the Caribbean, and the Pacific that are signatories to the Cotonou Agreement—are not counted against non-EU quotas due to the Kolpak ruling.

As of 1 October 2018

Note: Flags indicate national team as defined under FIFA eligibility rules; some limited exceptions apply. Players may hold more than one non-FIFA nationality.

No.	Pos.	Nation	Player
2	DF	FRA	Ruben Aguilar
3	DF	FRA	Daniel Congré
4	DF	BRA	Vitorino Hilton (captain)
5	DF	POR	Pedro Mendes
6	MF	FRA	Junior Sambia
7	MF	FRA	Paul Lasne
8	DF	CMR	Ambroise Oyongo
10	FW	FRA	Gaëtan Laborde
11	FW	FRA	Andy Delort (on loan from Toulouse)
12	FW	FRA	Bilal Boutobba
13	MF	TUN	Ellyes Skhiri (vice-captain)
14	DF	FRA	Damien Le Tallec
15	DF	FRA	Bryan Passi
16	GK	FRA	Dimitry Bertaud

No.	Pos.	Nation	Player
17	FW	FRA	Jérémie Porsan-Clemente
18	FW	FRA	Yanis Ammour
19	FW	SEN	Souleymane Camara
20	FW	RSA	Keagan Dolly
21	MF	FRA	Kylian Kaiboue
22	MF	FRA	Killian Sanson
23	MF	URU	Facundo Píriz
25	MF	FRA	Florent Mollet
27	DF	FRA	Clément Vidal
29	MF	FRA	Amir Adouyev
30	GK	FRA	Jonathan Ligali
31	DF	FRA	Nicolas Cozza
32	FW	SRB	Petar Škuletić
40	GK	FRA	Benjamin Lecomte

=== Out on loan ===
Note: Flags indicate national team as defined under FIFA eligibility rules; some limited exceptions apply. Players may hold more than one non-FIFA nationality.

No.	Pos.	Nation	Player
—	DF	FRA	Morgan Poaty (at Troyes)
—	FW	BEL	Isaac Mbenza (at Huddersfield Town)

No.	Pos.	Nation	Player
—	FW	CIV	Giovanni Sio (at Al-Ittihad)

== Competitions ==
=== Ligue 1 ===
==== League table ====
Pos	Team	Pld	W	D	L	GF	GA	GD	Pts	Qualification or relegation
4	Saint-Étienne	38	19	9	10	59	41	+18	66	Qualification to Europa League group stage
5	Marseille	38	18	7	13	60	52	+8	61	
6	Montpellier	38	15	14	9	53	42	+11	59	
7	Nice	38	15	11	12	30	35	−5	56	
8	Reims	38	13	16	9	39	42	−3	55	

Source: Ligue 1 and Soccerway
Rules for classification: 1) Points; 2) Goal difference; 3) Head-to-head points; 4) Head-to-head goal difference; 5) Head-to-head goals scored; 6) Head-to-head away goals scored; 7) Goals scored; 8) Away goals scored; 9) Most goals scored in single league match; 10) Fairplay ranking.

==== Results summary ====
Overall								Home						Away					
Pld	W	D	L	GF	GA	GD	Pts	W	D	L	GF	GA	GD	W	D	L	GF	GA	GD
38	15	14	9	53	42	+11	59	8	8	3	31	20	+11	7	6	6	22	22	0

Last updated: 24 May 2019.
Source: Competitive matches

==== Results by round ====
Round	1	2	3	4	5	6	7	8	9	10	11	12	13	14	15	16	17	18	19	20	21	22	23	24	25	26	27	28	29	30	31	32	33	34	35	36	37	38
Ground	H	A	H	A	H	H	A	H	A	H	A	H	A	H	A	H	A	A	H	A	A	H	A	H	A	H	A	H	A	H	A	H	A	H	H	A	H	A
Result	L	W	D	W	D	W	D	W	D	W	W	W	L	D	W	L	L	L	D	D	D	W	D	D	D	L	W	D	L	W	L	W	W	W	D	W	D	L
Position	13	11	12	7	6	3	5	3	4	3	3	2	3	3	2	3	3	4	4	5	6	6	5	5	6	7	7	7	8	7	8	6	6	5	5	5	5	6

Source: Results
A = Away; H = Home; W = Win; D = Draw; L = Loss

==== Matches ====
Win Draw Loss

11 August 2018 1	Montpellier	1–2	Dijon	Montpellier
20:00 CEST (UTC+2)	Pedro Mendes 5', (yellow card) 33'; Aguilar (yellow card) 81'	Report	Coulibaly (yellow card) 33', (goal) 90+1'; Tavares 52'; Yambéré (yellow card) 80'	Stadium: Stade de la Mosson; Attendance: 12,765; Referee: Florent Batta

18 August 2018 2	Amiens	1–2	Montpellier	Amiens
20:00 CEST (UTC+2)	Fofana (yellow card) 33'; Konaté 82' (pen.)	Report	Mollet 52'; Aguilar (yellow card) 64'; Delort (yellow card) 66'; Skhiri 71'; Lasne (yellow card) 79'	Stadium: Stade de la Licorne; Attendance: 10,397; Referee: Karim Abed

25 August 2018 3	Montpellier	0–0	Saint-Étienne	Montpellier
20:00 CEST (UTC+2)	Hilton (yellow card) 46'; Aguilar (yellow card) 50'; Lasne (yellow card) 54'	Report		Stadium: Stade de la Mosson; Attendance: 14,777; Referee: Jérôme Brisard

1 September 2018 4	Reims	0–1	Montpellier	Reims
20:00 CEST (UTC+2)		Report	Oyongo 77'	Stadium: Stade Auguste Delaune; Attendance: 12,042; Referee: Jérémy Stinat

15 September 2018 5	Montpellier	1–1	Strasbourg	Montpellier
20:00	Le Tallec 51'; Oyongo (yellow card) 59'	Report	Martin (yellow card) 28'; Martinez (yellow card) 87'; Mothiba 90+3'	Stadium: Stade de la Mosson; Attendance: 10,630; Referee: Willy Delajod

22 September 2018 6	Montpellier	1–0	Nice	Montpellier
20:00	Laborde 35'; Hilton (yellow card) 47'; Sambia (yellow card) 50'; Aguilar (yellow card) 90+1'	Report	Balotelli (yellow card) 53'; Saint-Maximin (yellow card) 90+3'	Stadium: Stade de la Mosson; Attendance: 11,015; Referee: Thomas Leonard

26 September 2018 7	SM Caen	2–2	Montpellier	Caen
19:00	Khaoui 10'; Bammou 64'; Ninga (yellow card) 79'; Fajr (yellow card) 89'	Report	Delort 37'; Le Tallec 52'; Mollet (yellow card) 62'; Hilton (red card) 83'; Sambia (yellow card) 90+2'	Stadium: Stade Michel d'Ornano; Attendance: 14,402; Referee: Antony Gautier

30 September 2018 8	Montpellier	3–0	Nîmes	Montpellier
17:00	Aguilar (yellow card) 3'; Oyongo 28', (yellow card) 62'; Delort 45+6' (pen.); Laborde 78'	Report	Lybohy (yellow card) 42'; Diallo (yellow card) 45+2'; Briançon (yellow card) 45+6'	Stadium: Stade de la Mosson; Attendance: 20,054; Referee: Ruddy Buquet

6 October 2018 9	Guingamp	1–1	Montpellier	Guingamp
20:00 CEST (UTC+2)	Thuram (red card) 7'; Benezet 64'	Report	Delort 30'; Oyongo (yellow card) 31'; Mollet (yellow card) 39' (yellow-red card) 39'	Stadium: Stade de Roudourou; Attendance: 13,643; Referee: Jérémy Stinat

21 October 2018 10	Montpellier	2–0	Bordeaux	Montpellier
15:00 CEST (UTC+2)	Laborde 17'; Pedro Mendes (yellow card) 33'; Skhiri (yellow card) 42'; Delort 53' (pen.)	Report	Karamoh (yellow card) 42'; Sabaly (yellow card) 47'; Lerager (yellow card) 50'; Pablo (yellow card) 53'	Stadium: Stade de la Mosson; Attendance: 12,491; Referee: Frank Schneider

27 October 2018 11	Toulouse	0–3	Montpellier	Toulouse
20:00 CEST (UTC+2)	Durmaz (yellow card) 22'; Jean (yellow card) 90+1'	Report	Delort (yellow card) 1', (goal) 24'; Laborde 21'; Reynet 90+3' (o.g.)	Stadium: Stadium Municipal; Attendance: 14,107; Referee: Karim Abed

4 November 2018 12	Montpellier	3–0	Marseille	Montpellier
21:00 CET (UTC+1)	Laborde 51', 62'; Lasne 70'	Report	Thauvin (yellow card) 30'; Sanson (yellow card) 53'; Gustavo (yellow card) 88'	Stadium: Stade de la Mosson; Attendance: 19,683; Referee: Antony Gautier

10 November 2018 13	Angers	1–0	Montpellier	Angers
20:00 CET (UTC+1)	Thomas 69'; N'Doye (yellow card) 90+1'	Report	Laborde (yellow card) 12'; Delort (yellow card) 50'	Stadium: Stade Raymond Kopa; Attendance: 8,342; Referee: Jérémy Stinat

25 November 2018 14	Montpellier	2–2	Rennes	Montpellier
15:00 CET (UTC+1)	Le Tallec (yellow card) 24'; Congré (yellow card) 37'; Delort 45+1', 49'; Pedro Mendes (yellow card) 85'	Report	Ben Arfa 5'; Mexer (yellow card) 33'; Bourigeaud 71' (pen.)	Stadium: Stade de la Mosson; Attendance: 10,761; Referee: Jérôme Brisard

1 December 2018 15	Monaco	1–2	Montpellier	Monaco
20:00 CET (UTC+1)	Tielemans 42'	Report	Laborde 81'; Škuletić 86'	Stadium: Stade Louis II; Attendance: 6,725; Referee: Olivier Thual

4 December 2018 16	Montpellier	0–1	Lille	Montpellier
21:00 CET (UTC+1)	Congré (yellow card) 52'; Aguilar (yellow card) 74'	Report	Pépé 6'; Ikoné (yellow card) 33'; Xeka (yellow card) 51'	Stadium: Stade de la Mosson; Attendance: 12,486; Referee: Mikael Lesage

22 December 2018 19	Montpellier	1–1	Lyon	Montpellier
21:00 CET (UTC+1)	Mendes (yellow card) 55'; Aguilar (yellow card) 60', (goal) 81'	Report	Fekir 67', (yellow card) 72'	Stadium: Stade de la Mosson; Attendance: 17,275; Referee: François Letexier

8 January 2019 18	Nantes	2–0	Montpellier	Nantes
19:00 CET (UTC+1)	Waris 62'; Touré (yellow card) 64'; Pallois 81'	Report	Mendes (yellow card) 11'; Laborde (red card) 19'; Lasne (yellow card) 88'	Stadium: Stade de la Beaujoire; Attendance: 15,780; Referee: Willy Delajod

13 January 2019 20	Dijon	1–1	Montpellier	Dijon
20:00 CET (UTC+1)	Saïd 54'; Tavares (yellow card) 88'; Lautoa (yellow card) 90'	Report	Le Tallec 61'	Stadium: Stade Gaston Gérard; Attendance: 11,910; Referee: Benoît Bastien

20 January 2019 21	Rennes	0–0	Montpellier	Rennes
15:00 CET (UTC+1)	Da Silva (yellow card) 50'; Sarr (yellow card) 74'	Report	Aguilar (yellow card) 41'; Hilton (yellow card) 53'	Stadium: Roazhon Park; Attendance: 23,990; Referee: Jérôme Miguelgorry

27 January 2019 22	Montpellier	2–0	SM Caen	Montpellier
15:00 CET (UTC+1)	Laborde 51'; Baysse 59' (o.g.); Sambia (yellow card) 84'	Report	Ninga (yellow card) 41'	Stadium: Stade de la Mosson; Attendance: 11,001; Referee: Hakim Ben El Hadj

3 February 2019 23	Nîmes	1–1	Montpellier	Nîmes
15:00 CET (UTC+1)	Landre 2'; Alioui (yellow card) 68'; Briançon (yellow card) 77'	Report	Mollet (yellow card) 45'; Delort 73'	Stadium: Stade des Costières; Attendance: 18,045; Referee: Antony Gautier

10 February 2019 24	Montpellier	2–2	Monaco	Montpellier
15:00 CET (UTC+1)	Skhiri (yellow card) 47'; Laborde 66'; Delort 90+1' (pen.)	Report	Martins 15'; Silva (yellow card) 62'; Falcao (yellow card) 68', (goal) 82'; Jemerson (yellow card) 70' (yellow-red card) 90+4'; Glik (yellow card) 90'; Vinícius (yellow card) 90+3'	Stadium: Stade de la Mosson; Attendance: 13,709; Referee: Frank Schneider

17 February 2019 25	Lille	0–0	Montpellier	Villeneuve-d'Ascq
15:00 CET (UTC+1)	Xeka (yellow card) 37'; Koné (yellow card) 44'; Fonte (yellow card) 78'	Report	Hilton (yellow card) 29'; Le Tallec (yellow card) 44'; Congré (yellow card) 56'	Stadium: Stade Pierre-Mauroy; Attendance: 36,967; Referee: Ruddy Buquet

20 February 2019 17	Paris Saint-Germain	5–1	Montpellier	Paris
21:00 CET (UTC+1)	Kurzawa 13'; Di María 45+1'; Dani Alves (yellow card) 64'; Verratti (yellow card) 67'; Škuletić 73' (o.g.); Hilton 78' (o.g.); Mbappé 79'	Report	Mollet 31'; Oyongo (yellow card) 59'	Stadium: Parc des Princes; Attendance: 47,198; Referee: François Letexier
Note: The match, originally scheduled for 8 December 2018, was postponed due to security concerns as a result of the yellow vests movement.

24 February 2019 26	Montpellier	2–4	Reims	Montpellier
15:00 CET (UTC+1)	Congré 6'; Laborde 55'	Report	Oudin 27', 70'; Zeneli 47' (pen.); Mendy (yellow card) 58'; Chavarría 88'	Stadium: Stade de la Mosson; Attendance: 11,124; Referee: Willy Delajod

5 March 2019 27	Bordeaux	1–2	Montpellier	Bordeaux
19:00 CET (UTC+1)	Bašić 35'; De Préville (yellow card) 39'	Report	Lasne 20'; Congré (yellow card) 42', (goal) 51'	Stadium: Matmut Atlantique; Attendance: 14,522; Referee: Jérôme Brisard

10 March 2019 28	Montpellier	2–2	Angers	Montpellier
15:00 CET (UTC+1)	Delort 3'; Skhiri 16', (yellow card) 70'; Mollet (yellow card) 68'; Lasne (yellow card) 81'	Report	Pavlović (red card) 73'; Fulgini 80'; Bahoken 90+1'	Stadium: Stade de la Mosson; Attendance: 10,931; Referee: Karim Abed

17 March 2019 29	Lyon	3–2	Montpellier	Décines-Charpieu
14:30 CET (UTC+1)	Terrier 12'; Dembélé 58'; Rafael (yellow card) 62'; Aouar 86'	Report	Delort (yellow card) 23'; Mollet 36'; Lasne (yellow card) 81'; Camara 90+1'	Stadium: Parc Olympique Lyonnais; Attendance: 47,134; Referee: Clément Turpin

3 April 2019 30	Montpellier	2–0	Guingamp	Montpellier
19:00 CEST (UTC+2)	Delort 22'; Ristić 78'	Report	Merghem (yellow card) 67'; Traoré (yellow card) 68'	Stadium: Stade de la Mosson; Attendance: 11,187; Referee: Frank Schneider

7 April 2019 31	Nice	1–0	Montpellier	Nice
17:00 CEST (UTC+2)	Dante 20'; Srarfi (yellow card) 83'	Report	Hilton (yellow card) 34'	Stadium: Allianz Riviera; Attendance: 17,980; Referee: Ruddy Buquet

14 April 2019 32	Montpellier	2–1	Toulouse	Montpellier
15:00 CEST (UTC+2)	Mendes (yellow card) 51'; Skhiri 55'; Mollet (yellow card) 63'; Camara 77'	Report	Sidibé 67'; Jullien (yellow card) 86'	Stadium: Stade de la Mosson; Attendance: 11,986; Referee: Benoît Millot

20 April 2019 33	Strasbourg	1–3	Montpellier	Strasbourg
20:00 CEST (UTC+2)	Gonçalves (yellow card) 30'; Martinez 34'; Martin (yellow card) 83'	Report	Delort 22', 86'; Mollet 28'; Mendes (yellow card) 46'; Oyongo (yellow card) 52'	Stadium: Stade de la Meinau; Attendance: 25,192; Referee: François Letexier

30 April 2019 34	Montpellier	3–2	Paris Saint-Germain	Montpellier
19:00 CEST (UTC+2)	Kimpembe 22' (o.g.); Suárez (yellow card) 45+1'; Skhiri (yellow card) 56'; Le Tallec (yellow card) 72'; Delort 80'; Camara 85'	Report	Oyongo 12' (o.g.); Kimpembe (yellow card) 29'; Bernat (yellow card) 40'; Di María 62'; Dagba (yellow card) 76'; Kurzawa (yellow card) 90'	Stadium: Stade de la Mosson; Attendance: 20,477; Referee: Mikael Lesage

5 May 2019 35	Montpellier	1–1	Amiens	Montpellier
15:00 CEST (UTC+2)	Mollet 82'; Congré (yellow card) 90+5'	Report	Mendoza 66'; Gurtner (yellow card) 82'; Dibassy (yellow card) 90+1'	Stadium: Stade de la Mosson; Attendance: 14,330; Referee: Olivier Thual

10 May 2019 36	Saint-Étienne	0–1	Montpellier	Saint-Étienne
20:45 CEST (UTC+2)	Cabella (yellow card) 51' (yellow-red card) 62'; Nordin (yellow card) 56'	Report	Mollet (yellow card) 42'; Suárez (yellow card) 45+1'; Congré (red card) 53'; Skhiri (yellow card) 53'; Lecomte (yellow card) 55'; Laborde 64'	Stadium: Stade Geoffroy-Guichard; Attendance: 35,644; Referee: Benoît Bastien

18 May 2019 37	Montpellier	1–1	Nantes	Montpellier
21:00 CEST (UTC+2)	Mollet 76'	Report	Diego Carlos (yellow card) 2'; Coulibaly 24'; Touré (yellow card) 29'; Pallois (yellow card) 90+6'	Stadium: Stade de la Mosson; Attendance: 16,063; Referee: Ruddy Buquet

24 May 2019 38	Marseille	1–0	Montpellier	Marseille
21:05 CEST (UTC+2)	Sanson (yellow card) 11'; Thauvin 55'; Balotelli (red card) 87'; Hubočan (yellow card) 89'	Report		Stadium: Stade Vélodrome; Attendance: 53,788; Referee: Antony Gautier

=== Coupe de France ===
5 January 2019 Round of 64	L'Entente SSG	1–0	Montpellier	Saint-Gratien
15:00 CET (UTC+1)	Ba (yellow card) 41'; Géran 90+3'	Report	Le Tallec (yellow card) 74'	Stadium: Parc des Sports Michel Hidalgo; Attendance: 3,557; Referee: Ruddy Buquet

=== Coupe de la Ligue ===
30 October 2018 Round of 32	Montpellier	0–3	Nantes	Montpellier
18:45 CET (UTC+1)	Cozza (yellow card) 42'; Mendes (red card) 74'	Report	Waris (yellow card) 24', (goal) 80'; Evangelist (yellow card) 35'; Coulibaly 58'; Girotto (yellow card) 74'; Rongier (yellow card) 84'; Sala 90+4'	Stadium: Stade de la Mosson; Attendance: 6,774; Referee: Olivier Thual

== Statistics ==
=== Appearances and goals ===
No.	Pos	Nat	Player	Total		Ligue 1		Coupe de France		Coupe de la Ligue	
No.	Pos	Nat	Player	Apps	Goals	Apps	Goals	Apps	Goals	Apps	Goals
Goalkeepers
16	GK	(France) FRA	Dimitry Bertaud	2	0	1	0	0	0	1	0
30	GK	(France) FRA	Jonathan Ligali	0	0	0	0	0	0	0	0
40	GK	(France) FRA	Benjamin Lecomte	38	0	37	0	1	0	0	0
Defenders
2	DF	(France) FRA	Ruben Aguilar	30	1	29	1	1	0	0	0
3	DF	(France) FRA	Daniel Congré	39	2	37	2	1	0	1	0
4	DF	(Brazil) BRA	Vitorino Hilton	37	0	36	0	0	0	1	0
5	DF	(Portugal) POR	Pedro Mendes	32	1	31	1	0	0	1	0
8	DF	(Cameroon) CMR	Ambroise Oyongo	27	2	25+1	2	1	0	0	0
14	DF	(France) FRA	Damien Le Tallec	37	3	31+5	3	1	0	0	0
15	DF	(France) FRA	Bryan Passi	0	0	0	0	0	0	0	0
24	DF	(Uruguay) URU	Mathías Suárez	10	0	7+3	0	0	0	0	0
26	DF	(Serbia) SRB	Mihailo Ristić	10	1	3+7	1	0	0	0	0
27	DF	(France) FRA	Clément Vidal	0	0	0	0	0	0	0	0
31	DF	(France) FRA	Nicolas Cozza	14	0	11+1	0	1	0	1	0
Midfielders
6	MF	(France) FRA	Junior Sambia	32	0	7+23	0	1	0	1	0
7	MF	(France) FRA	Paul Lasne	37	2	18+17	2	1	0	1	0
13	MF	(Tunisia) TUN	Ellyes Skhiri	38	3	35+2	3	1	0	0	0
21	MF	(France) FRA	Kylian Kaiboue	0	0	0	0	0	0	0	0
22	MF	(France) FRA	Killian Sanson	0	0	0	0	0	0	0	0
23	MF	(Uruguay) URU	Facundo Píriz	7	0	0+6	0	0	0	1	0
25	MF	(France) FRA	Florent Mollet	33	6	31+1	6	0	0	0+1	0
29	MF	(France) FRA	Amir Adouyev	0	0	0	0	0	0	0	0
Forwards
10	FW	(France) FRA	Gaëtan Laborde	38	11	35+1	11	1	0	0+1	0
11	FW	(France) FRA	Andy Delort	38	14	36	14	1	0	0+1	0
12	FW	(France) FRA	Bilal Boutobba	2	0	0+2	0	0	0	0	0
17	FW	(France) FRA	Jérémie Porsan-Clemente	1	0	0	0	0	0	1	0
18	FW	(France) FRA	Yanis Ammour	1	0	0+1	0	0	0	0	0
19	FW	(Senegal) SEN	Souleymane Camara	13	3	0+12	3	0	0	1	0
20	FW	(South Africa) RSA	Keagan Dolly	4	0	2+1	0	0+1	0	0	0
32	FW	(Serbia) SRB	Petar Škuletić	30	1	4+24	1	0+1	0	1	0
Players transferred out during the season
—	FW	(Ivory Coast) CIV	Giovanni Sio	0	0	0	0	0	0	0	0

Last updated: 24 May 2019
Source: Competitions
