= 2017–18 Montpellier HSC season =

Montpellier HSC
2017–18 season
- Chairman: Laurent Nicollin
- Manager: Michel Der Zakarian
- Stadium: Stade de la Mosson
- Ligue 1: 10th
- Coupe de France: Round of 16
- Coupe de la Ligue: Semi-finals
- Top goalscorer: League: Giovanni Sio (10); All: Isaac Mbenza; Giovanni Sio (10 each)
| Home colours | Away colours | Third colours |

The 2017–18 Montpellier HSC season was the club's 91st season in existence and the club's 16th consecutive season in the top flight of French football. In addition to the domestic league, Montpellier participated in this season's editions of the Coupe de France and the Coupe de la Ligue. The season covered the period from 1 July 2017 to 30 June 2018.

== Players ==
=== First-team squad ===
As of 23 January 2018

Note: Flags indicate national team as defined under FIFA eligibility rules; some limited exceptions apply. Players may hold more than one non-FIFA nationality.

| No. | Pos. | Nation | Player |
|---|---|---|---|
| 1 | GK | FRA | Laurent Pionnier |
| 2 | DF | FRA | Ruben Aguilar |
| 3 | DF | FRA | Daniel Congré |
| 4 | DF | BRA | Vitorino Hilton (captain) |
| 5 | DF | POR | Pedro Mendes |
| 6 | MF | FRA | Junior Sambia (on loan from Niort) |
| 7 | MF | FRA | Paul Lasne |
| 8 | DF | CMR | Ambroise Oyongo |
| 9 | FW | FRA | Jonathan Ikoné (on loan from Paris SG) |
| 13 | MF | TUN | Ellyes Skhiri (vice-captain) |
| 14 | FW | CIV | Giovanni Sio |
| 15 | DF | FRA | Bryan Passi |
| 16 | GK | FRA | Dimitry Bertaud |

| No. | Pos. | Nation | Player |
|---|---|---|---|
| 17 | FW | FRA | Jérémie Porsan-Clemente |
| 18 | FW | BEL | Isaac Mbenza |
| 19 | FW | SEN | Souleymane Camara |
| 20 | FW | RSA | Keagan Dolly |
| 22 | MF | FRA | Killian Sanson |
| 23 | DF | FRA | Nordi Mukiele |
| 24 | DF | FRA | Jérôme Roussillon |
| 26 | DF | FRA | Morgan Poaty |
| 27 | MF | URU | Facundo Píriz (on loan from Grozny) |
| 29 | FW | CHA | Casimir Ninga |
| 31 | DF | FRA | Nicolas Cozza |
| 40 | GK | FRA | Benjamin Lecomte |

=== Out on loan ===
Note: Flags indicate national team as defined under FIFA eligibility rules; some limited exceptions apply. Players may hold more than one non-FIFA nationality.

| No. | Pos. | Nation | Player |
|---|---|---|---|
| — | GK | FRA | Jonathan Ligali (on loan to Dunkerque) |

== Pre-season and friendlies ==
Win Draw Loss Fixtures

| 15 July 2017 Friendly | Montpellier | 0–1 | Rodez |
| --:-- CEST (UTC+2) |

| 19 July 2017 Friendly | Montpellier | 0–2 | Clermont Foot |
| --:-- CEST (UTC+2) |

| 22 July 2017 Friendly | Toulouse | 1–1 | Montpellier |
| --:-- CEST (UTC+2) |

| 26 July 2017 Friendly | Montpellier | 1–0 | Saint-Étienne |
| --:-- CEST (UTC+2) |

| 30 July 2017 Friendly | Montpellier | 1–1 | Lyon |
| --:-- CEST (UTC+2) |

| 5 August 2017 Friendly | Montpellier | 1–0 | Caen |
| --:-- CEST (UTC+2) |

| 6 October 2017 Friendly | Girona | 3–2 | Montpellier |
| --:-- CEST (UTC+2) |

== Competitions ==
=== Overview ===
| Competition | First match | Last match | Starting round | Final position | Record | | | | | | | |
| Competition | First match | Last match | Starting round | Final position | Pld | W | D | L | GF | GA | GD | Win % |
|---|---|---|---|---|---|---|---|---|---|---|---|---|
| Ligue 1 | 5 August 2017 | 19 May 2018 | Matchday 1 | 10th | 38 | 11 | 18 | 9 | 36 | 33 | +3 | 28.95 |
| Coupe de France | 6 January 2018 | 7 February 2018 | Round of 64 | Round of 16 | 3 | 1 | 1 | 1 | 6 | 6 | +0 | 33.33 |
| Coupe de la Ligue | 24 October 2017 | 31 January 2018 | Third round | Semi-finals | 4 | 3 | 0 | 1 | 7 | 3 | +4 | 75.00 |
| Total | | | | | 45 | 15 | 19 | 11 | 49 | 42 | +7 | 33.33 |

Last updated: 19 May 2018
Source: Soccerway

=== Ligue 1 ===
==== League table ====
| Pos | Team | Pld | W | D | L | GF | GA | GD | Pts |
|---|---|---|---|---|---|---|---|---|---|
| 8 | Nice | 38 | 15 | 9 | 14 | 53 | 52 | +1 | 54 |
| 9 | Nantes | 38 | 14 | 10 | 14 | 36 | 41 | −5 | 52 |
| 10 | Montpellier | 38 | 11 | 18 | 9 | 36 | 33 | +3 | 51 |
| 11 | Dijon | 38 | 13 | 9 | 16 | 55 | 73 | −18 | 48 |
| 12 | Guingamp | 38 | 12 | 11 | 15 | 48 | 59 | −11 | 47 |

Source: Ligue 1 and Soccerway
Rules for classification: 1) Points; 2) Goal difference; 3) Head-to-head points; 4) Head-to-head goal difference; 5) Head-to-head goals scored; 6) Head-to-head away goals; 7) Goals scored; 8) Away goals scored; 9) Most goals scored in one league match; 10) Fair-play points

==== Results summary ====
| Overall | | | | | | | | Home | | | | | | Away | | | | | |
| Pld | W | D | L | GF | GA | GD | Pts | W | D | L | GF | GA | GD | W | D | L | GF | GA | GD |
|---|---|---|---|---|---|---|---|---|---|---|---|---|---|---|---|---|---|---|---|
| 38 | 11 | 18 | 9 | 36 | 33 | +3 | 51 | 5 | 9 | 5 | 20 | 19 | +1 | 6 | 9 | 4 | 16 | 14 | +2 |

Last updated: 19 May 2018.
Source: Ligue 1

==== Results by round ====
| Round | 1 | 2 | 3 | 4 | 5 | 6 | 7 | 8 | 9 | 10 | 11 | 12 | 13 | 14 | 15 | 16 | 17 | 18 | 19 | 20 | 21 | 22 | 23 | 24 | 25 | 26 | 27 | 28 | 29 | 30 | 31 | 32 | 33 | 34 | 35 | 36 | 37 | 38 |
|---|---|---|---|---|---|---|---|---|---|---|---|---|---|---|---|---|---|---|---|---|---|---|---|---|---|---|---|---|---|---|---|---|---|---|---|---|---|---|
| Ground | H | A | H | A | H | A | H | A | H | A | H | H | A | H | A | H | A | H | A | H | A | H | A | H | A | H | A | H | A | H | A | A | H | A | H | A | H | A |
| Result | W | L | D | L | L | W | D | D | W | W | L | D | D | W | D | D | D | L | W | D | D | W | L | W | W | D | D | D | D | D | W | D | L | L | L | W | D | D |
| Position | 8 | 11 | 9 | 12 | 17 | 12 | 12 | 13 | 11 | 8 | 9 | 8 | 8 | 7 | 7 | 8 | 7 | 11 | 7 | 8 | 8 | 7 | 7 | 6 | 6 | 6 | 5 | 6 | 8 | 7 | 6 | 6 | 7 | 8 | 8 | 8 | 9 | 10 |

Source: Ligue 1
A = Away; H = Home; W = Win; D = Draw; L = Loss

==== Matches ====
The league fixtures were announced on 15 June 2017.

| 5 August 2017 1 | Montpellier | 1–0 | Caen | Montpellier |
| --:-- CEST (UTC+2) | | Report | | Stadium: Stade de la Mosson |

| 12 August 2017 2 | Toulouse | 1–0 | Montpellier | Toulouse |
| --:-- CEST (UTC+2) | | Report | | Stadium: Stadium Municipal |

| 19 August 2017 3 | Montpellier | 1–1 | Strasbourg | Montpellier |
| --:-- CEST (UTC+2) | | Report | | Stadium: Stade de la Mosson |

| 26 August 2017 4 | Dijon | 2–1 | Montpellier | Dijon |
| --:-- CEST (UTC+2) | | Report | | Stadium: Stade Gaston Gérard |

| 9 September 2017 5 | Montpellier | 0–1 | Nantes | Montpellier |
| --:-- CEST (UTC+2) | | Report | | Stadium: Stade de la Mosson |

| 16 September 2017 6 | Troyes | 0–1 | Montpellier | Troyes |
| --:-- CEST (UTC+2) | | Report | | Stadium: Stade de l'Aube |

| 23 September 2017 7 | Montpellier | 0–0 | Paris Saint-Germain | Montpellier |
| --:-- CEST (UTC+2) | | Report | | Stadium: Stade de la Mosson |

| 29 September 2017 8 | Monaco | 1–1 | Montpellier | Monaco |
| --:-- CEST (UTC+2) | | Report | | Stadium: Stade Louis II |

| 15 October 2017 9 | Montpellier | 2–0 | Nice | Montpellier |
| --:-- CEST (UTC+2) | | Report | | Stadium: Stade de la Mosson |

| 20 October 2017 10 | Saint-Étienne | 0–1 | Montpellier | Saint-Étienne |
| --:-- CEST (UTC+2) | | Report | | Stadium: Stade Geoffroy-Guichard |

| 28 October 2017 11 | Montpellier | 0–1 | Rennes | Montpellier |
| --:-- CEST (UTC+2) | | Report | | Stadium: Stade de la Mosson |

| 4 November 2017 12 | Montpellier | 1–1 | Amiens | Montpellier |
| --:-- CEST (UTC+2) | | Report | | Stadium: Stade de la Mosson |

| 19 November 2017 13 | Lyon | 0–0 | Montpellier | Décines-Charpieu |
| --:-- CEST (UTC+2) | | Report | | Stadium: Parc Olympique Lyonnais |

| 25 November 2017 14 | Montpellier | 3–0 | Lille | Montpellier |
| --:-- CEST (UTC+2) | | Report | | Stadium: Stade de la Mosson |

| 29 November 2017 15 | Guingamp | 0–0 | Montpellier | Guingamp |
| --:-- CEST (UTC+2) | | Report | | Stadium: Stade du Roudourou |

| 3 December 2017 16 | Montpellier | 1–1 | Marseille | Montpellier |
| --:-- CEST (UTC+2) | | Report | | Stadium: Stade de la Mosson |

| 9 December 2017 17 | Angers | 1–1 | Montpellier | Angers |
| --:-- CEST (UTC+2) | | Report | | Stadium: Stade Raymond Kopa |

| 16 December 2017 18 | Montpellier | 1–3 | Metz | Montpellier |
| --:-- CEST (UTC+2) | | Report | | Stadium: Stade de la Mosson |

| 20 December 2017 19 | Bordeaux | 0–2 | Montpellier | Bordeaux |
| --:-- CEST (UTC+2) | | Report | | Stadium: Matmut Atlantique |

| 13 January 2018 20 | Montpellier | 0–0 | Monaco | Montpellier |
| --:-- CEST (UTC+2) | | Report | | Stadium: Stade de la Mosson |

| 17 January 2018 21 | Amiens | 1–1 | Montpellier | Amiens |
| --:-- CEST (UTC+2) | | Report | | Stadium: Stade de la Licorne |

| 20 January 2018 22 | Montpellier | 2–1 | Toulouse | Montpellier |
| --:-- CEST (UTC+2) | | Report | | Stadium: Stade de la Mosson |

| 27 January 2018 23 | Paris Saint-Germain | 4–0 | Montpellier | Paris |
| --:-- CEST (UTC+2) | | Report | | Stadium: Parc des Princes |

| 3 February 2018 24 | Montpellier | 2–1 | Angers | Montpellier |
| --:-- CEST (UTC+2) | | Report | | Stadium: Stade de la Mosson |

| 10 February 2018 25 | Metz | 0–1 | Montpellier | Metz |
| --:-- CEST (UTC+2) | | Report | | Stadium: Stade Saint-Symphorien |

| 17 February 2018 26 | Montpellier | 1–1 | Guingamp | Montpellier |
| --:-- CEST (UTC+2) | | Report | | Stadium: Stade de la Mosson |

| 23 February 2018 27 | Strasbourg | 0–0 | Montpellier | Strasbourg |
| --:-- CEST (UTC+2) | | Report | | Stadium: Stade de la Meinau |

| 4 March 2018 28 | Montpellier | 1–1 | Lyon | Montpellier |
| --:-- CEST (UTC+2) | | Report | | Stadium: Stade de la Mosson |

| 10 March 2018 29 | Lille | 1–1 | Montpellier | Villeneuve-d'Ascq |
| --:-- CEST (UTC+2) | | Report | | Stadium: Stade Pierre-Mauroy |

| 17 March 2018 30 | Montpellier | 2–2 | Dijon | Montpellier |
| --:-- CEST (UTC+2) | | Report | | Stadium: Stade de la Mosson |

| 1 April 2018 31 | Caen | 1–3 | Montpellier | Caen |
| --:-- CEST (UTC+2) | | Report | | Stadium: Stade Michel d'Ornano |

| 8 April 2018 32 | Marseille | 0–0 | Montpellier | Marseille |
| --:-- CEST (UTC+2) | | Report | | Stadium: Stade Vélodrome |

| 15 April 2018 33 | Montpellier | 1–3 | Bordeaux | Montpellier |
| --:-- CEST (UTC+2) | | Report | | Stadium: Stade de la Mosson |

| 22 April 2018 34 | Nice | 1–0 | Montpellier | Nice |
| --:-- CEST (UTC+2) | | Report | | Stadium: Allianz Riviera |

| 27 April 2018 35 | Montpellier | 0–1 | Saint-Étienne | Montpellier |
| --:-- CEST (UTC+2) | | Report | | Stadium: Stade de la Mosson |

| 6 May 2018 36 | Nantes | 0–2 | Montpellier | Nantes |
| --:-- CEST (UTC+2) | | Report | | Stadium: Stade de la Beaujoire |

| 12 May 2018 37 | Montpellier | 1–1 | Troyes | Montpellier |
| --:-- CEST (UTC+2) | | Report | | Stadium: Stade de la Mosson |

| 19 May 2018 38 | Rennes | 1–1 | Montpellier | Rennes |
| --:-- CEST (UTC+2) | | Report | | Stadium: Roazhon Park |

=== Coupe de France ===
| 6 January 2018 Round of 64 | CA Pontarlier | 1–1 (a.e.t.) (2–4 p) | Montpellier | Pontarlier |
| 15:00 CET (UTC+1) | | | | Stadium: Stade Paul Robbe; Attendance: 2,980; Referee: Frank Schneider |

| 24 January 2018 Round of 32 | Montpellier | 4–3 | Lorient | Montpellier |
| 18:30 CET (UTC+1) | | | | Stadium: Stade de la Mosson; Attendance: 3,841; Referee: Benoît Millot |

| 7 February 2018 Round of 16 | Montpellier | 1–2 | Lyon | Montpellier |
| 21:00 CET (UTC+1) | | | | Stadium: Stade de la Mosson; Attendance: 7,000; Referee: Mikael Lesage |

=== Coupe de la Ligue ===
| 24 October 2017 Third round | Guingamp | 0–2 | Montpellier | Guingamp |
| 21:05 CEST (UTC+2) | | | | Stadium: Stade du Roudourou; Attendance: 13,318; Referee: Benoît Millot |

| 13 December 2017 Round of 16 | Montpellier | 4–1 | Lyon | Montpellier |
| 21:05 CET (UTC+1) | | | | Stadium: Stade de la Mosson; Attendance: 7,447; Referee: Jérôme Brisard |

| 10 January 2018 Quarter-finals | Angers | 0–1 | Montpellier | Angers |
| 21:05 CET (UTC+1) | | | | Stadium: Stade Raymond Kopa; Attendance: 4,705; Referee: Ruddy Buquet |

| 31 January 2018 Semi-finals | Monaco | 2–0 | Montpellier | Monaco |
| 21:05 CET (UTC+1) | | | | Stadium: Stade Louis II; Attendance: 6,024; Referee: Amaury Delerue |

== Statistics ==
=== Goalscorers ===
As of 19 May 2018

| Rank | No. | Pos | Nat | Name | Ligue 1 | Coupe de France | Coupe de la Ligue | Total |
|---|---|---|---|---|---|---|---|---|
| 1 | 14 | FW | (Ivory Coast) | Giovanni Sio | 10 | 0 | 0 | 10 |
| 1 | 18 | FW | (Belgium) | Isaac Mbenza | 8 | 1 | 1 | 10 |
| 3 | 13 | MF | (Tunisia) | Ellyes Skhiri | 4 | 0 | 0 | 4 |
| Totals | | | | | 36 | 6 | 7 | 49 |
