= Dimitry Bertaud =

French-Congolese footballer (born 1998)

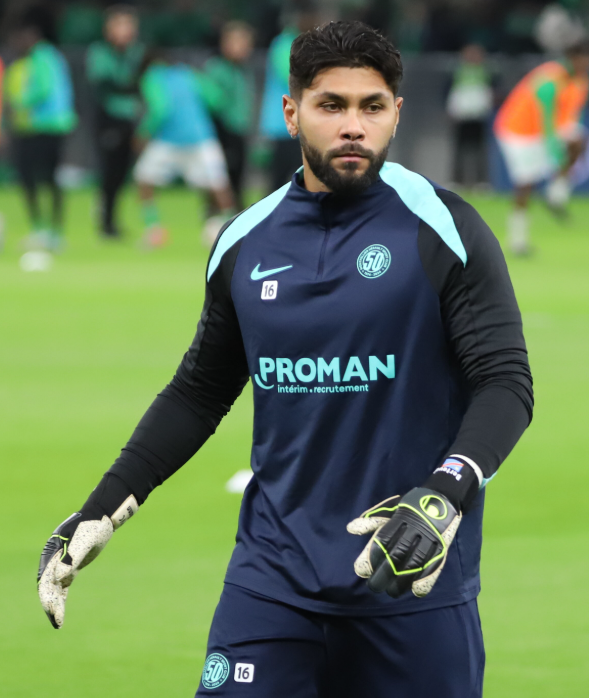
- Bertaud with Montpellier in 2024

Personal information
- Full name: Dimitry Jean Sylvain Bertaud Yaka
- Date of birth: 6 June 1998 (age 28)
- Place of birth: Montpellier, France
- Height: 1.80 m (5 ft 11 in)
- Position: Goalkeeper

Team information
- Current team: Forge FC
- Number: 16

Youth career
- 2004–2011: Avenir Castriote
- 2011–2017: Montpellier

Senior career*
Years	Team	Apps	(Gls)
2014–2024	Montpellier II	65	(0)
2019–2025	Montpellier	32	(0)
2026–	Forge FC	23	(0)

International career^{‡}
2013	France U16	1	(0)
2017	France U19	5	(0)
2017–2018	France U20	5	(0)
2019	France U21	9	(0)
2023–	DR Congo	16	(0)
- * Club domestic league appearances and goals as of 25 October 2026 ‡ National team caps and goals as of 17:47, 2 October 2026 (UTC)

Dimitry Jean Sylvain Bertaud Yaka (born 6 June 1998) is a professional footballer who plays as a goalkeeper for Canadian Premier League club Forge FC. Born in France, he plays for the DR Congo national team.

Bertaud first joined Montpellier at the age of 13 and within three years found himself training with the club's first and reserve teams. He made his professional debut for the club in 2019.

Born in France, Bertaud has represented France internationally in various youth levels, first with the under-16s and later on from the under 19 level, all the way up to the France Olympic football team. He opted to play for the DR Congo national team at the senior level.

== Early life ==
Bertaud was born in Montpellier, France, on 6 June 1998. He was born to a French father and DR Congolese mother.

== Club career ==
=== Early career ===
Bertaud first joined his local football academy, Avenir Castriote, at age 6, where he stayed for seven years, before moving to Montpellier's youth system.

=== Montpellier ===
Bertaud quickly proved his worth at Montpellier, and quickly advanced to teams older than his age group, playing in the U17 and U19 youth leagues, before appearing with the reserves at only age 16.

==== 2014–15 season ====
As is typical with reserve teams of professional clubs in French football, the goalkeeping spot was an object of contention among first team players looking for playing time and youth team players looking for a chance to break through. In a season where Montpellier's reserves were struggling to avoid relegation from the fourth division, this resulted Laurent Pionnier and Jonathan Ligali continuously switching places between the first team's bench in the Ligue 1 and the reserves' starting line-up, with a series of youth players sitting on the reserves' bench. A broken finger for main man Geoffrey Jourdren in November meant that both Pionnier and Ligali would play with the first team, leaving open the number 1 spot for the reserves.

Bertaud was unexpectedly chosen to take that spot, ahead of Benjamin Martinez, Charly Boucherat and Valentin Lamoulie, who had all sat on the reserve team's bench during the season, unlike Bertaud. His debut came on 13 December, in a match against Saint-Priest, which Montpellier's reserves lost 2–0. This was followed by two more lost matches, before Jourdren's recovery sent Pionnier and Ligali back to the bench and reserves. However, this wouldn't last more than a month, as Pionnier himself was incapacitated, and Bertaud again overtook the reserves team's bench to claim the starting position for himself, a position he would keep for two months, during which the reserves lost five games and drew two, failing to register a win.

Bertaud's breakthrough carried on, however, and in April Rolland Courbis called him up to the first team, while Ligali and a recovered Pionnier played with reserves. Bertaud first sat on the first team's bench behind Jourdren on 26 April, and he kept his seat for two more matches. By the end of the season, Montpellier had finished 7th in the Ligue 1, while the reserve team finished 15th in Group C and were relegated. Bertaud played 10 games with the reserves, without yet keeping a clean sheet. The U19 side, with which Bertaud spent most of the season, placed 5th in Group D.

==== 2015–16 season ====
After a breakthrough season, Bertaud sought a chance to build upon his achievements. The reserves had been relegated to the fifth division, making it easier for younger players to claim playing-time. However, despite Jourdren suffering a series of injuries and missing out on most of the season, Pionnier and Ligali continued switching places between first and reserve teams, leaving the younger goalkeepers out. Bertaud was also challenged by Boucherat, who now claimed more playing time, being the reserves' main goalkeeper, following his "graduation" from the club's U19 side.

Bertaud began the season on the reserves' bench, behind Pionnier, but immediately lost the spot to Boucherat. However, by the end of September, he was called up to the first team's bench, instead, again behind Pionnier, as Ligali spent time with the reserves, and stayed there until the end of October. Montpellier had a terrible start at the Ligue 1, with 5 points in 10 games and, despite improving and climbing to 15th place, Courbis resigned after the season's first half, and he was replaced by Frédéric Hantz. Bertaud's first appearance in a match occurred on 13 February against Toulouse's reserves, which Montpellier's reserves won 2–0, earning him his first clean sheet. Excluding another brief stint on the main team's bench, he kept the starting spot during March, before playing the reserves' final three games into June.

Montpellier rallied at the end of the season, finishing 12th and avoiding relegation, while the reserves finished 2nd in Group C and were promoted back to the Championnat de France Amateur. Bertaud played six matches, managing to register a clean sheet. With the U19 side, Bertaud finished 4th in Group D.

==== 2016–17 season ====
Boucherat's move to Agde gave Bertaud the chance to cement himself in with the reserves. This was compounded after Jourdren suffered another injury-marred season, and both Pionnier and Ligali spent much of the season with the first team. However, up until Jourdren's first injury, he started the season on the bench. His first appearance was on 27 August against Toulon, where Montpellier's reserves lost 3–0. His first stint between the posts was between October and December, before returning to the bench behind Ligali.

After the new year, Bertaud would play with both the reserves and the U19 team, as the latter played in the Coupe Gambardella, as well as returning to the first team's bench under coach Jean-Louis Gasset, who had replaced Hantz after he was sacked at the end of January, as Ligali was also injured, alongside Jourdren. Bertraud played the reserves' final games, as they finished 15th in Group D and were once again relegated. Bertaud was eventually called up to the under-19 and under-20 national teams. Montpellier's first team finished 15th, while the U19 team won the Coupe Gambardella, beating Marseille 5–4 in a penalty shoot-out, after a 1–1 draw, also finishing 2nd in Group D. On 12 June, he signed his first professional contract with Montpellier, to the end of the 2021–22 season, and was given the number 40.

==== 2017–18 season ====
With Ligali joining Dunkerque on loan, Bertaud became Montpellier's third-in-line, behind Pionnier and Benjamin Lecomte, who was transferred from Lorient to replace Jourdren, who himself left for Nancy. Taking the number 16, Bertaud played almost all of the reserves' matches, starting with a 1–1 draw against Rodéo on 19 August. He debuted with the first team in a 2–0 Coupe de la Ligue win over Guingamp on 24 October 2017. Montpellier would continue in the Coupe de la Ligue up until the semi-finals, with Bertaud playing as Montpellier knocked out Lyon and Angers, with scorelines of 4–1 and 1–0, respectively. In the semi-final against Monaco, coach Michel Der Zakarian opted for Lecomte; Montpellier lost 2–0 and were knocked out.

Bertaud also played in the Coupe de France round of 32 match against Lorient on 24 January, a hard-fought 4–3 win for Montpellier, before they were knocked out of the cup by Lyon. Montpellier finished tenth in the league, while the reserves finished third in Group H, failing to regain promotion. Bertaud played his first full season with 25 games and 10 clean sheets, building on the previous seasons' chances.

==== 2018–19 season ====
Following his successful season with the reserves, Bertaud became Montpellier's second choice, as Pionnier retired; Ligali returned from his loan as the third choice. This offered him less playing time, although he still played some games in the Championnat National 3 to keep his legs fresh. Once again, he played in the Coupe de la Ligue third round, where Montpellier lost 3–0 to Nantes. Bertaud also played his first Ligue 1 game on 20 January, due to Lecomte fracturing his rib, keeping a clean sheet in a 0–0 draw against Rennes. Montpellier finished sixth, missing out on next season's UEFA competitions, while the reserves finished first in Group H, earning promotion to the Championnat National 2.

==== 2019–20 season ====
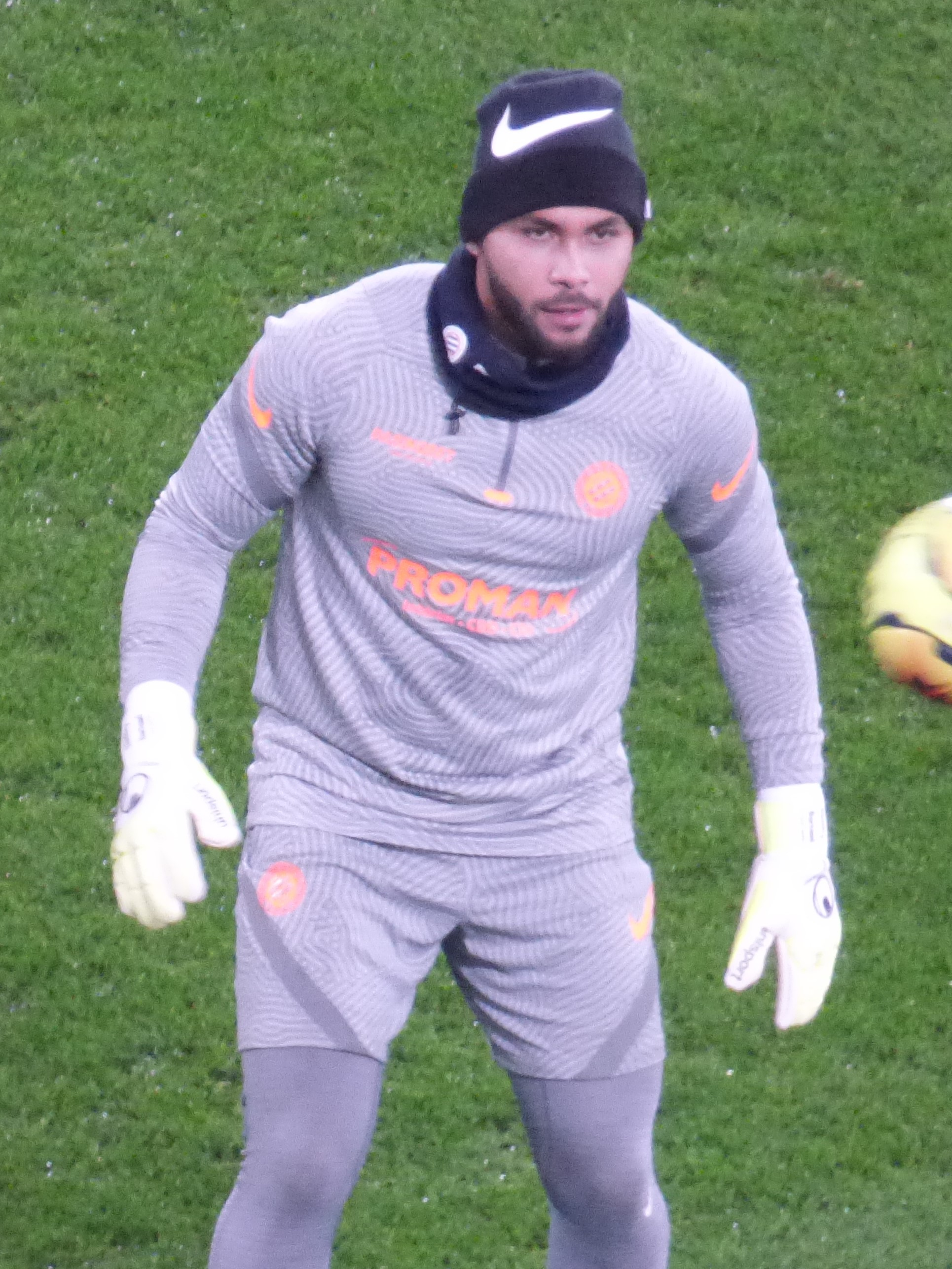
Bertaud warming up for Montpellier HSC in December 2020

After Lecomte joined Monaco, coach Der Zakarian brought in Gerónimo Rulli on loan from Real Sociedad, and Bertaud remained the second choice, ahead of Matis Carvalho, who joined from Toulouse after Ligali left the club. Bertaud played the opener against Rennes, but again spent most of the season on the bench, playing Montpellier's Coupe de la Ligue games, in the competition's final season. Bertaud was then called up to the under-21. He also played in the Coupe de France round of 16 game against Belfort, coming on after Rulli was sent off in the 4th minute of stoppage time. The scoreline stood 0–0 after extra time, and Montpellier were knocked out after losing 5–4 in the subsequent penalty shoot-out. For the next league game on 1 February against Paris Saint-Germain, Rulli was suspended and Bertaud started under the posts, before being himself sent off in the 17th minute, while the score stood 1–0 to PSG; the match ended 5–0, in a game where Joris Chotard was also sent off in the 88th.

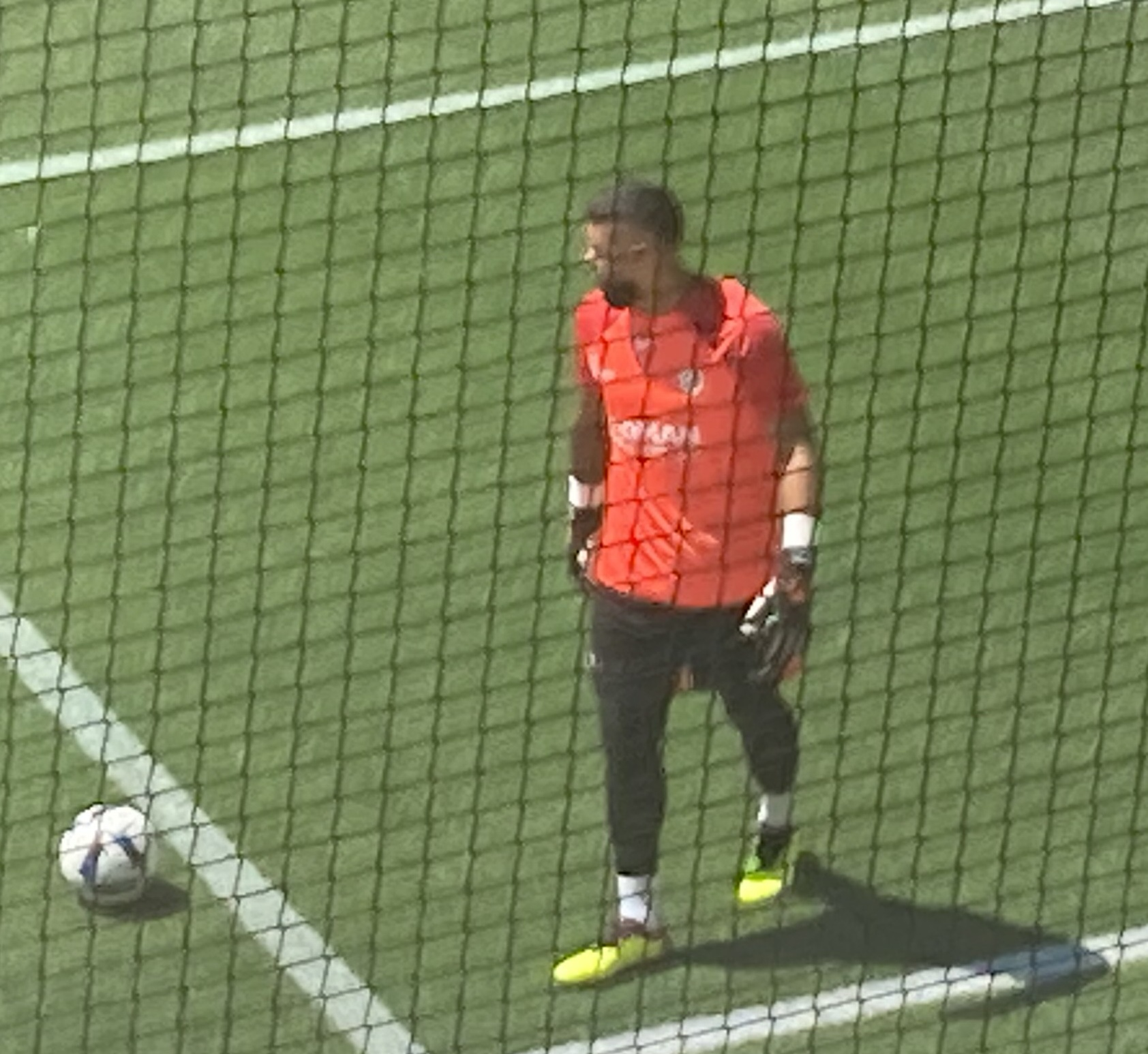
Bertaud warming up for Montpellier in August 2022

Montpellier stood 8th when the league was suspended due to the COVID-19 pandemic, once more narrowly missing out on UEFA competitions. Bertaud had also played a couple of games with the reserves, who stood 14th in Group C when the league was suspended, and were once again relegated.

==== 2020–21 season ====
Bertaud remained second in line after Rulli returned to Sociedad, as coach Der Zakarian brought in Swiss international Jonas Omlin. Nevertheless, he got to play some games in the Ligue 1. He was briefly sidelined with an injured shoulder, before playing for all of Montpellier's Coupe de France campaign, which ended in the semi-finals after a 2–2 draw against PSG; Montpellier lost 6–5 in the penalty shoot-out. At the end of the season Montpellier finished 8th once again.

=== Forge ===
On 1 February 2026, Bertaud signed for Canadian Premier League club Forge FC on a multi-year contract. He made his debut for Forge in a Concacaf Champions Cup match against Tigres, and earned much praise for making seven saves and helping the underdogs keep a 0–0 draw. On 21 October 2026, Bertaud saved three penalties and was named Man of the Match as Forge defeated CF Montreal in the 2026 Canadian Championship final, becoming the first Canadian Premier League team to win the title. Bertaud also received the George Gross Memorial Trophy as tournament MVP.

== International career ==
=== France ===
==== Under-16 ====
While still playing for Montpellier's youth teams, Bertaud got his first national call-up for the France national under-16 football team by Jean-Claude Giuntini, where he debuted on 31 October, in a 2–1 friendly victory over the Netherlands.

==== Under-19 ====
Following Bertaud's professional contract and performances with Montpellier's reserves, Bertaud was called up again by Giuntini after four years, to play with the France national under-19 football team, alongside Saint-Étienne's Anthony Maisonnial, in the 2017 UEFA European Under-19 Championship qualification elite round. After France lost to Bosnia and Herzegovina and Bulgaria, Bertaud debuted on 27 March against Israel, the game ending 0–0. France placed last in Group 5 and were disqualified.

Bertaud also represented France at the 2017 Toulon Tournament. After a clean draw against Wales and a 2–1 defeat to Ivory Coast, France defeated Bahrain 6–1, Bertaud playing all three games.

==== Under-20 ====
Bertaud was quickly promoted to the France national under-20 football team by Philippe Montanier. Later, under Johan Radet, he played at the 2018 Toulon Tournament. France played in Group B, defeating South Korea 4–1 and Togo, losing 1–0 to Scotland and finishing second.

==== Under-21 ====
Thanks to his Ligue 1 performances, Bertaud was called up to the France national under-21 football team by Sylvain Ripoll for the 2021 UEFA European Under-21 Championship qualification tournament, where he was the second choice behind Nantes' Alban Lafont with Leeds' Illan Meslier. Bernaud only played in a friendly match against the Czech Republic, which France won 3–1. France topped Group B of the qualifiers. In the final tournament, Bertaud stayed on the bench as France placed second in Group C, before being knocked out by the Netherlands at the quarter-finals.

==== Under-23 ====
Bertaud was called up to the France Olympic football team for the 2020 Summer Olympics in Tokyo, alongside Angers' Paul Bernardoni and Saint-Étienne's Stefan Bajic. Bertaud stayed on the bench again, as France placed third in Group A.

=== DR Congo ===
On 2 October 2023, he was called up to the DR Congo national team for a set of friendlies.

== Career statistics ==
=== Club ===
As of match played 19 September 2026

Appearances and goals by club, season, and competition
Club	Season	League			National cup (Note: Includes Coupe de France, Canadian Championship)		League cup (Note: Includes Coupe de la Ligue)		Continental		Other		Total	
Club	Season	Division	Apps	Goals	Apps	Goals	Apps	Goals	Apps	Goals	Apps	Goals	Apps	Goals
Montpellier B	2014–15	CFA	10	0	—		—		—		—		10	0
Montpellier B	2015–16	CFA 2	6	0	—		—		—		—		6	0
Montpellier B	2016–17	CFA	12	0	—		—		—		—		12	0
Montpellier B	2017–18	CFA 2	21	0	—		—		—		—		21	0
Montpellier B	2018–19	CFA 2	9	0	—		—		—		—		9	0
Montpellier B	2019–20	CFA	2	0	—		—		—		—		2	0
Montpellier B	2021–22	CFA	2	0	—		—		—		—		2	0
Montpellier B	2022–23	CFA 2	2	0	—		—		—		—		2	0
Montpellier B	2023–24	CFA 2	1	0	—		—		—		—		1	0
Montpellier B	Total		65	0	0	0	0	0	0	0	0	0	65	0
Montpellier	2017–18	Ligue 1	0	0	1	0	3	0	—		—		4	0
Montpellier	2018–19	Ligue 1	1	0	0	0	1	0	—		—		2	0
Montpellier	2019–20	Ligue 1	3	0	1	0	2	0	—		—		6	0
Montpellier	2020–21	Ligue 1	9	0	5	0	—		—		—		14	0
Montpellier	2021–22	Ligue 1	11	0	3	0	—		—		—		14	0
Montpellier	2022–23	Ligue 1	0	0	0	0	—		—		—		0	0
Montpellier	2023–24	Ligue 1	4	0	0	0	—		—		—		4	0
Montpellier	2024–25	Ligue 1	4	0	1	0	—		—		—		5	0
Montpellier	Total		32	0	11	0	6	0	0	0	0	0	49	0
Forge FC	2026	Canadian Premier League	22	0	5	0	—		2 (Note: Appearances in CONCACAF Champions Cup)	0	—		29	0
Career total			119	0	16	0	6	0	2	0	0	0	143	0

=== International ===
As of match played 2 October 2026

Appearances and goals by national team and year
National team	Year	Apps	Goals
DR Congo	2023	1	0
DR Congo	2024	9	0
DR Congo	2025	5	0
DR Congo	2026	1	0
Total		16	0

== Honours ==
Montpellier II

- Coupe Gambardella: 2016–17
- Championnat National 3: 2018–19

Forge FC

- Canadian Championship: 2026

Individual

- George Gross Memorial Trophy: 2026
