= 2019–20 Montpellier HSC season =

Montpellier
2019–20 season
- Chairman: Laurent Nicollin
- Head coach: Michel Der Zakarian
- Stadium: Stade de la Mosson
- Ligue 1: 8th
- Coupe de France: Round of 16
- Coupe de la Ligue: Round of 16
- Top goalscorer: League: Andy Delort (9); All: Andy Delort (12)
- Highest home attendance: 20,197 (vs Paris Saint-Germain, 7 December 2019)
- Lowest home attendance: 10,786 (vs Metz, 5 February 2020)
- Average home league attendance: 14,147
- Biggest win: League: Montpellier 4–0 Brest; All: Montpellier 5–0 Caen, CdF
- Biggest defeat: League/All: Paris Saint-Germain 5–0 Montpellier; Rennes 5–0 Montpellier
Home colours	Away colours	Third colours

The 2019–20 season was Montpellier HSC's 101st season in existence and the club's 11th consecutive season in the top flight of French football. In addition to the domestic league, Montpellier participated in this season's editions of the Coupe de France, and the Coupe de la Ligue. The season covered the period from 1 July 2019 to 30 June 2020.

== Players ==
=== Squad information ===
As of 18 January 2020

Note: Flags indicate national team as defined under FIFA eligibility rules; some limited exceptions apply. Players may hold more than one non-FIFA nationality.

No.	Pos.	Nation	Player
1	GK	ARG	Gerónimo Rulli (on loan from Real Sociedad)
2	DF	FRA	Arnaud Souquet
3	DF	FRA	Daniel Congré
4	DF	BRA	Hilton (vice-captain)
5	DF	POR	Pedro Mendes
6	MF	FRA	Junior Sambia
8	DF	CMR	Ambroise Oyongo
9	FW	ALG	Andy Delort
10	FW	FRA	Gaëtan Laborde
11	MF	FRA	Téji Savanier
12	MF	FRA	Jordan Ferri
13	MF	FRA	Joris Chotard
14	DF	FRA	Damien Le Tallec
15	FW	ALG	Bilal Boutobba

No.	Pos.	Nation	Player
16	GK	FRA	Dimitry Bertaud
19	FW	SEN	Souleymane Camara (captain)
20	MF	RSA	Keagan Dolly
21	MF	FRA	Kylian Kaïboué
24	FW	KOR	Yun Il-lok
25	MF	FRA	Florent Mollet
26	DF	SRB	Mihailo Ristić
27	DF	FRA	Clément Vidal
29	MF	RUS	Amir Adouyev
30	GK	FRA	Mathis Carvalho
31	DF	FRA	Nicolas Cozza
32	FW	SRB	Petar Škuletić

=== Out on loan ===
Note: Flags indicate national team as defined under FIFA eligibility rules; some limited exceptions apply. Players may hold more than one non-FIFA nationality.

No.	Pos.	Nation	Player
—	MF	FRA	Killian Sanson (on loan at Quevilly-Rouen)
—	FW	FRA	Bastian Badu (on loan at FC Chambly)

No.	Pos.	Nation	Player
—	FW	FRA	Yanis Ammour (on loan at Béziers)

== Pre-season and friendlies ==
Win Draw Loss

12 July 2019 Friendly	Montpellier	2–2	Béziers	Millau, France
19:00 CEST (UTC+2)	Laborde 38'; Ferri 48'	Report	Montiel 7' (pen.), 77'	Stadium: Stade Gabriel-Monteillet

19 July 2019 Friendly	Saint-Étienne	4–2	Montpellier	Washington, D.C., United States
20:00 EDT (UTC−4)	Debuchy 33', 73'; Cabella 52' (pen.); Diony 84'	Report	Hilton 35'; Laborde 45' (pen.)	Stadium: Audi Field

21 July 2019 Friendly	Montpellier	1–2	Bordeaux	Washington, D.C., United States
20:00 EDT (UTC−4)	Savanier 45+1' (pen.)	Report	De Préville 7', 54'	Stadium: Audi Field

27 July 2019 Friendly	Huddersfield Town	1–1	Montpellier	Huddersfield, England
15:00 BST (UTC+1)	Grant 55'	Report	Laborde 15'	Stadium: Kirklees Stadium; Attendance: 5,833

3 August 2019 Friendly	Girona	0–1	Montpellier	Girona, Spain
20:30 CEST (UTC+2)		Report	Laborde 3'	Stadium: Estadi Montilivi

== Competitions ==
=== Overview ===
Competition	First match	Last match	Starting round	Final position	Record							
Competition	First match	Last match	Starting round	Final position	Pld	W	D	L	GF	GA	GD	Win %
Ligue 1	10 August 2019	8 March 2020	Matchday 1	8th	28	11	7	10	35	34	+1	39.29
Coupe de France	5 January 2020	28 January 2020	Round of 64	Round of 16	3	2	1	0	6	0	+6	66.67
Coupe de la Ligue	30 October 2019	17 December 2019	Round of 32	Round of 16	2	1	0	1	3	3	+0	50.00
Total					33	14	8	11	44	37	+7	42.42

Source: Soccerway

=== Ligue 1 ===
==== League table ====
Pos	Team	Pld	W	D	L	GF	GA	GD	Pts	PPG	Qualification or relegation
6	Reims	28	10	11	7	26	21	+5	41 (Note: Nice finished ahead of Reims on head-to-head points: Nice 2–0 Reims, Reims 1–1 Nice.)	1.46	Qualification for the Europa League second qualifying round (Note: Since the winners of the Coupe de France and the Coupe de la Ligue, Paris Saint-Germain, qualified for the Champions League, the spot given to the Coupe de France winners (Europa League group stage) was passed to the fifth-placed team and the spot given to the Coupe de la Ligue winners (Europa League second qualifying round) was passed to the sixth-placed team.)
7	Lyon	28	11	7	10	42	27	+15	40	1.43	
8	Montpellier	28	11	7	10	35	34	+1	40	1.43	
9	Monaco	28	11	7	10	44	44	0	40	1.43	
10	Strasbourg	27	11	5	11	32	32	0	38	1.41	

Source: Ligue 1
Rules for classification: 1) Points per game; 2) Head-to-head points; 3) Head-to-head goal difference; 4) Goal difference; 5) Goals scored; 6) Fairplay ranking.

==== Results summary ====
Overall								Home						Away					
Pld	W	D	L	GF	GA	GD	Pts	W	D	L	GF	GA	GD	W	D	L	GF	GA	GD
28	11	7	10	35	34	+1	40	10	2	2	26	10	+16	1	5	8	9	24	−15

Last updated: 8 March 2020.
Source: Ligue 1

==== Results by round ====
Round	1	2	3	4	5	6	7	8	9	10	11	12	13	14	15	16	17	18	19	20	21	22	23	24	25	26	27	28	29	30	31	32	33	34	35	36	37	38
Ground	H	A	H	A	H	A	H	A	H	A	H	A	H	A	H	A	H	A	H	A	H	A	H	H	A	A	H	A	H	A	H	A	H	A	H	A	H	A
Result	L	D	W	L	W	D	W	L	W	L	D	D	W	D	W	D	L	L	W	W	W	L	D	W	L	L	W	L	C	C	C	C	C	C	C	C	C	C
Position	16	14	12	14	12	12	10	10	7	8	10	12	6	6	4	6	10	12	9	6	4	5	5	5	6	9	6	8	8	8	8	8	8	8	8	8	8	8

Source: Ligue 1
A = Away; H = Home; W = Win; D = Draw; L = Loss; C = Cancelled

==== Matches ====
The Ligue 1 schedule was announced on 14 June 2019. The Ligue 1 matches were suspended by the LFP on 13 March 2020 due to COVID-19 until further notices. On 28 April 2020, it was announced that Ligue 1 and Ligue 2 campaigns would not resume, after the country banned all sporting events until September. On 30 April, The LFP ended officially the 2019–20 season.

10 August 2019 1	Montpellier	0–1	Rennes	Montpellier
20:00 CEST (UTC+2)	Souquet (yellow card) 18'; Chotard (yellow card) 49'; Delort (yellow card) 90+4'	Report	Morel 6'; Maouassa (yellow card) 34'; Tait (red card) 69'; Siebatcheu (yellow card) 90+4'; Grenier (yellow card) 90+6'	Stadium: Stade de la Mosson; Attendance: 15,212; Referee: Willy Delajod

17 August 2019 2	Bordeaux	1–1	Montpellier	Bordeaux
20:00 CEST (UTC+2)	Kalu (yellow card) 68'; Maja 70'; Koscielny (yellow card) 85'	Report	Delort 22'; Congré (yellow card) 76'	Stadium: Matmut Atlantique; Attendance: 30,192; Referee: Frank Schneider

27 August 2019 3	Montpellier	1–0	Lyon	Montpellier
19:00 CEST (UTC+2)	Souquet 42', (yellow card) 90'; P. Mendes (yellow card) 54'	Report	Andersen (yellow card) 35'; Tousart (yellow card) 49'; Koné (red card) 51'; T. Mendes (yellow card) 56'; Tete (yellow card) 82'	Stadium: Stade de la Mosson; Attendance: 19,387; Referee: Mikael Lesage

31 August 2019 4	Nantes	1–0	Montpellier	Nantes
20:00 CEST (UTC+2)	Bamba (yellow card) 33'; Abeid (yellow card) 71'; Touré 85'	Report	Mendes (yellow card) 28'; Laborde (yellow card) 45+1'	Stadium: Stade de la Beaujoire; Attendance: 18,980; Referee: Karim Abed

14 September 2019 5	Montpellier	2–1	Nice	Montpellier
20:00 CEST (UTC+2)	Delort 37'; Mendes (yellow card) 39'; Mollet 56', (yellow card) 57'	Report	Atal (yellow card) 21'; Tameze 35'; Coly (yellow card) 42'	Stadium: Stade de la Mosson; Attendance: 12,765; Referee: Olivier Thual

21 September 2019 6	Marseille	1–1	Montpellier	Marseille
17:30 CEST (UTC+2)	Amavi (yellow card) 19'; Strootman (yellow card) 67'; Germain 75'; Kamara (red card) 90+2'; Payet (yellow card) 90+4' (yellow-red card) 90+4'	Report	Sarr 17' (o.g.); Souquet (yellow card) 22'; Oyongo (yellow card) 44'; Mendes (yellow card) 59'; Ferri (red card) 90+2'	Stadium: Stade Vélodrome; Attendance: 48,007; Referee: Amaury Delerue

25 September 2019 7	Montpellier	1–0	Nîmes	Montpellier
19:00 CEST (UTC+2)	Souquet 31'; Mollet (yellow card) 49'; Delort (yellow card) 67'; Hilton (yellow card) 83'	Report	Deaux (yellow card) 21'; Miguel (yellow card) 53'; Landre (yellow card) 60'; Fomba (yellow card) 65'	Stadium: Stade de la Mosson; Attendance: 16,445; Referee: Benoît Bastien

29 September 2019 8	Strasbourg	1–0	Montpellier	Strasbourg
15:00 CEST (UTC+2)	Da Costa (yellow card) 17'; Ajorque 26', (yellow card) 32'; Simakan (yellow card) 45'; Djiku (yellow card) 77'	Report	Dolly (yellow card) 35'; Mendes (yellow card) 67'	Stadium: Stade de la Meinau; Attendance: 25,010; Referee: Hakim Ben El Hadj

5 October 2019 9	Montpellier	3–1	Monaco	Montpellier
20:00 CEST (UTC+2)	Mollet 31'; Mendes 39'; Cozza (yellow card) 47'; Delort 56'	Report	Golovin (yellow card) 58' (yellow-red card) 82'; Ben Yedder 69'	Stadium: Stade de la Mosson; Attendance: 15,532; Referee: François Letexier

19 October 2019 10	Reims	1–0	Montpellier	Reims
20:00 CEST (UTC+2)	Abdelhamid 3'; Cafaro (yellow card) 61'; Romao (yellow card) 83'	Report		Stadium: Stade Auguste-Delaune; Attendance: 12,187; Referee: Florent Batta

26 October 2019 11	Montpellier	0–0	Angers	Montpellier
20:00 CEST (UTC+2)	Savanier (yellow card) 59'; Mollet (yellow card) 90+4'	Report	Traoré (yellow card) 49'; Capelle (yellow card) 75'; Pereira Lage (yellow card) 90+1'	Stadium: Stade de la Mosson; Attendance: 12,678; Referee: Benoît Millot

2 November 2019 12	Metz	2–2	Montpellier	Metz
20:00 CET (UTC+1)	Diallo 26', (yellow card) 52'; Nguette 48'	Report	Hilton (yellow card) 39'; Congré (yellow card) 63'; Delort 73'; Sambia 79'	Stadium: Stade Saint-Symphorien; Attendance: 14,644; Referee: Stéphanie Frappart

10 November 2019 13	Montpellier	3–0	Toulouse	Montpellier
17:00 CET (UTC+1)	Chotard (yellow card) 34'; Laborde 43'; Le Tallec 59'; Savanier 75'; Sambia (yellow card) 87'	Report	Sangaré (yellow card) 39'; Vainqueur (yellow card) 41'	Stadium: Stade de la Mosson; Attendance: 12,734; Referee: Thomas Leonard

24 November 2019 14	Saint-Étienne	0–0	Montpellier	Saint-Étienne
17:00 CET (UTC+1)	Youssouf (yellow card) 27'; Perrin (yellow card) 28'; Trauco (yellow card) 54'	Report	Mendes (yellow card) 21'; Congré (yellow card) 61'; Mollet (yellow card) 90+2'	Stadium: Stade Geoffroy-Guichard; Attendance: 24,336; Referee: Frank Schneider

30 November 2019 15	Montpellier	4–2	Amiens	Montpellier
20:00 CET (UTC+1)	Le Tallec 14'; Laborde 64'; Delort 67'; Mollet 72'; Mendes (yellow card) 74'	Report	Lefort (yellow card) 26'; Mendoza (yellow card) 40'; Kakuta 44'; Otero (red card) 53'; Lahne 86'	Stadium: Stade de la Mosson; Attendance: 11,744; Referee: Jérémie Pignard

4 December 2019 16	Dijon	2–2	Montpellier	Dijon
19:00 CET (UTC+1)	Sambia 2' (o.g.); Mendyl (yellow card) 34'; Amalfitano (yellow card) 43'; Chafik (yellow card) 55'; Mavididi 72'	Report	Mollet 15'; Savanier 30', (yellow card) 76'; Vidal (yellow card) 61'; Le Tallec (yellow card) 78'	Stadium: Stade Gaston Gérard; Attendance: 11,926; Referee: François Letexier

7 December 2019 17	Montpellier	1–3	Paris Saint-Germain	Montpellier
17:30 CET (UTC+1)	Mendes (yellow card) 5' (yellow-red card) 72'; Paredes 41' (o.g.); Oyongo (yellow card) 45+3'; Chotard (yellow card) 79'; Souquet (yellow card) 85'	Report	Diallo (yellow card) 42'; Bernat (yellow card) 59'; Neymar 74'; Mbappé 76'; Icardi 81'; Thiago Silva (yellow card) 83'	Stadium: Stade de la Mosson; Attendance: 20,197; Referee: Antony Gautier

13 December 2019 18	Lille	2–1	Montpellier	Villeneuve-d'Ascq
20:45 CET (UTC+1)	André (yellow card) 25'; Ikoné 40' (pen.), (yellow card) 85'; Sanches 84', (yellow card) 85'	Report	Savanier (yellow card) 37'; Delort 74'	Stadium: Stade Pierre-Mauroy; Attendance: 30,170; Referee: Jérôme Brisard

21 December 2019 19	Montpellier	4–0	Brest	Montpellier
20:45 CET (UTC+1)	Laborde 13', 56'; Savanier 30' (pen.); Delort (yellow card) 49'; Mollet 83'	Report	Chardonnet (yellow card) 28'	Stadium: Stade de la Mosson; Attendance: 12,975; Referee: Jérémy Stinat

11 January 2020 20	Amiens	1–2	Montpellier	Amiens
20:00 CET (UTC+1)	Dibassy 14', (yellow card) 55'; Blin (yellow card) 62'	Report	Laborde 50'; Sambia (yellow card) 58'; Delort 83'	Stadium: Stade de la Licorne; Attendance: 10,205; Referee: Karim Abed

25 January 2020 21	Montpellier	2–1	Dijon	Montpellier
20:00 CET (UTC+1)	Delort (yellow card) 33', (goal) 63'; Congré (yellow card) 48'; Mollet 56'	Report	Chouiar (yellow card) 19' (yellow-red card) 54'; Baldé 76'	Stadium: Stade de la Mosson; Attendance: 11,129; Referee: Jérôme Miguelgorry

1 February 2020 22	Paris Saint-Germain	5–0	Montpellier	Paris
17:30 CET (UTC+1)	Sarabia 8'; Kimpembe (yellow card) 33'; Neymar (yellow card) 38'; Di María 41'; Congré 44' (o.g.); Mbappé 57'; Kurzawa 65'; Paredes (yellow card) 84'	Report	Bertaud (red card) 17'; Mollet (yellow card) 39'; Chotard (yellow card) 81' (yellow-red card) 88'; Souquet (yellow card) 86'	Stadium: Parc des Princes; Attendance: 47,701; Referee: Jérôme Brisard

5 February 2020 23	Montpellier	1–1	Metz	Montpellier
19:00 CET (UTC+1)	Savanier 13'; Souquet (yellow card) 14'; Ferri (yellow card) 39'	Report	N'Doram (yellow card) 64'; Boulaya 80'	Stadium: Stade de la Mosson; Attendance: 10,786; Referee: Hakim Ben El Hadj

9 February 2020 24	Montpellier	1–0	Saint-Étienne	Montpellier
15:00 CET (UTC+1)	Delort 25'; Sambia (red card) 42'; Ristić (yellow card) 64'	Report	Perrin (yellow card) 17'; Fofana (yellow card) 45'; Bouanga (yellow card) 51'	Stadium: Stade de la Mosson; Attendance: 14,669; Referee: Amaury Delerue

14 February 2020 25	Monaco	1–0	Montpellier	Monaco
20:45 CET (UTC+1)	Slimani (yellow card) 22', (goal) 52'	Report	Savanier (yellow card) 54'; Le Tallec (yellow card) 86'	Stadium: Stade Louis II; Attendance: 4,384; Referee: Ruddy Buquet

22 February 2020 26	Angers	1–0	Montpellier	Angers
20:00 CET (UTC+1)	Bamba (yellow card) 32'; Doumbia (yellow card) 40'; Pavlović (yellow card) 64'; Bahoken 68'; Capelle (yellow card) 81'	Report	Delort (yellow card) 83'; Oyongo (yellow card) 90+2'	Stadium: Stade Raymond Kopa; Attendance: 9,453; Referee: Antony Gautier

29 February 2020 27	Montpellier	3–0	Strasbourg	Montpellier
20:00 CET (UTC+1)	Savanier 57' (pen.), 65'; Laborde 61'; Le Tallec (yellow card) 72'	Report	Djiku (yellow card) 56'; Waris (yellow card) 90+2'	Stadium: Stade de la Mosson; Attendance: 11,799; Referee: Mikael Lesage

8 March 2020 28	Rennes	5–0	Montpellier	Rennes
17:00 CET (UTC+1)	Maouassa 9'; Hunou 28', 87' (pen.); Léa Siliki (yellow card) 57'; Tait 68'; Del Castillo 73' (pen.); Bourigeaud (yellow card) 77'	Report	Savanier (yellow card) 25'; Sambia (yellow card) 77'; Mendes (yellow card) 86'	Stadium: Roazhon Park; Attendance: 24,818; Referee: Jérémie Pignard

29	Montpellier	Cancelled	Marseille	Montpellier
--:-- CEST (UTC+2)				Stadium: Stade de la Mosson; Attendance: 0

30	Nice	Cancelled	Montpellier	Nice
--:-- CEST (UTC+2)				Stadium: Allianz Riviera; Attendance: 0

31	Montpellier	Cancelled	Lille	Montpellier
--:-- CEST (UTC+2)				Stadium: Stade de la Mosson; Attendance: 0

32	Nîmes	Cancelled	Montpellier	Nîmes
--:-- CEST (UTC+2)				Stadium: Stade des Costières; Attendance: 0

33	Montpellier	Cancelled	Reims	Montpellier
--:-- CEST (UTC+2)				Stadium: Stade de la Mosson

34	Brest	Cancelled	Montpellier	Brest
--:-- CEST (UTC+2)				Stadium: Stade Francis-Le Blé

35	Montpellier	Cancelled	Bordeaux	Montpellier
--:-- CEST (UTC+2)				Stadium: Stade de la Mosson

36	Lyon	Cancelled	Montpellier	Décines-Charpieu
--:-- CEST (UTC+2)				Stadium: Parc Olympique Lyonnais

37	Montpellier	Cancelled	Nantes	Montpellier
--:-- CEST (UTC+2)				Stadium: Stade de la Mosson

38	Toulouse	Cancelled	Montpellier	Toulouse
--:-- CEST (UTC+2)				Stadium: Stadium de Toulouse

=== Coupe de France ===
5 January 2020 Round of 64	EF Reims Ste Anne Châtillons	0–1	Montpellier	Reims
14:15 CET (UTC+1)	Trémor (yellow card) 90+1'; Barrilliot (yellow card) 90+2'	Report	Hilton 6'	Stadium: Stade Auguste-Delaune; Attendance: 3,824; Referee: Florent Batta

19 January 2020 Round of 32	Montpellier	5–0	Caen	Montpellier
17:15 CET (UTC+1)	Ferri (yellow card) 21'; Savanier 24' (pen.); Laborde 37'; Delort 40', 64'; Congré (yellow card) 50'; Mollet 59'	Report	Pi (yellow card) 32' (yellow-red card) 43'	Stadium: Stade de la Mosson; Attendance: 4,697; Referee: Thomas Léonard

28 January 2020 Round of 16	ASM Belfort	0–0 (a.e.t.) (5–4 p)	Montpellier	Belfort
18:30 CET (UTC+1)	Konki (yellow card) 35'; Arisi (yellow card) 54'; Régnier (yellow card) 74'	Report	Rulli (red card) 90+4'; Le Tallec (yellow card) 98'; Delort (yellow card) 120+2'	Stadium: Stade Roger Serzian; Attendance: 4,500; Referee: Olivier Thual
	Penalties
	Régnier (penalty scored); Magassouba (penalty scored); Grasso (penalty missed); Ranneaud (penalty scored); Cuenin (penalty scored); Loichot (penalty scored)		(penalty scored) Savanier; (penalty scored) Delort; (penalty missed) Sambia; (penalty scored) Laborde; (penalty scored) Camara; (penalty missed) Le Tallec

=== Coupe de la Ligue ===
30 October 2019 Round of 32	Montpellier	3–2	Nancy	Montpellier
21:05 CET (UTC+1)	Mollet 13'; Delort 21'; Congré (yellow card) 28'; Chotard (yellow card) 62', (goal) 76'; Cozza (red card) 68'; Sambia (yellow card) 88'	Report	Lefebvre (yellow card) 42'; Dembélé (yellow card) 57'; Vagner 59'; Lybohy (yellow card) 66', (goal) 89'	Stadium: Stade de la Mosson; Attendance: 7,655; Referee: Hakim Ben El Hadj

17 December 2019 Round of 16	Reims	1–0	Montpellier	Reims
18:45 CET (UTC+1)	Cafaro 78' (pen.); Oudin (yellow card) 90'	Report	Ristić (red card) 69'; Mendes (yellow card) 77'	Stadium: Stade Auguste-Delaune; Attendance: 4,606; Referee: Willy Delajod

== Statistics ==
=== Appearances and goals ===
No.	Pos	Nat	Player	Total		Ligue 1		Coupe de France		Coupe de la Ligue	
No.	Pos	Nat	Player	Apps	Goals	Apps	Goals	Apps	Goals	Apps	Goals
Goalkeepers
1	GK	(Argentina) ARG	Gerónimo Rulli	20	0	19	0	1	0	0	0
16	GK	(France) FRA	Dimitry Bertaud	3	0	1	0	0	0	2	0
30	GK	(France) FRA	Mathis Carvalho	0	0	0	0	0	0	0	0
Defenders
2	DF	(France) FRA	Arnaud Souquet	20	2	17+1	2	1	0	0+1	0
3	DF	(France) FRA	Daniel Congré	19	0	15+1	0	1	0	2	0
4	DF	(Brazil) BRA	Vitorino Hilton	23	1	20	0	1	1	1+1	0
5	DF	(Portugal) POR	Pedro Mendes	17	1	15	1	0	0	2	0
8	DF	(Cameroon) CMR	Ambroise Oyongo	18	0	17	0	0	0	0+1	0
14	DF	(France) FRA	Damien Le Tallec	23	2	20	2	1	0	1+1	0
24	DF	(Uruguay) URU	Mathías Suárez	2	0	1	0	1	0	0	0
26	DF	(Serbia) SRB	Mihailo Ristić	16	0	4+9	0	1	0	2	0
27	DF	(France) FRA	Clément Vidal	1	0	1	0	0	0	0	0
31	DF	(France) FRA	Nicolas Cozza	8	0	6+1	0	0	0	1	0
Midfielders
6	MF	(France) FRA	Junior Sambia	13	1	3+7	1	1	0	2	0
11	MF	(France) FRA	Téji Savanier	13	3	10+1	3	0	0	2	0
12	MF	(France) FRA	Jordan Ferri	9	0	7+1	0	0+1	0	0	0
13	MF	(France) FRA	Joris Chotard	17	1	12+3	0	1	0	1	1
20	MF	(South Africa) RSA	Keagan Dolly	6	0	1+5	0	0	0	0	0
21	MF	(France) FRA	Kylian Kaiboue	0	0	0	0	0	0	0	0
25	MF	(France) FRA	Florent Mollet	19	6	12+5	5	0	0	2	1
29	MF	(Russia) RUS	Amir Adouyev	0	0	0	0	0	0	0	0
Forwards
9	FW	(Algeria) ALG	Andy Delort	22	8	19	7	1	0	1+1	1
10	FW	(France) FRA	Gaëtan Laborde	23	5	19+1	5	1	0	1+1	0
15	FW	(Algeria) ALG	Bilal Boutobba	0	0	0	0	0	0	0	0
19	FW	(Senegal) SEN	Souleymane Camara	12	1	0+11	1	0	0	1	0
32	FW	(Serbia) SRB	Petar Škuletić	6	0	1+4	0	0	0	1	0
Players transferred out during the season

Last updated: 11 January 2020
Source: Competitions
