= Ruben Aguilar =

French footballer (born 1993)

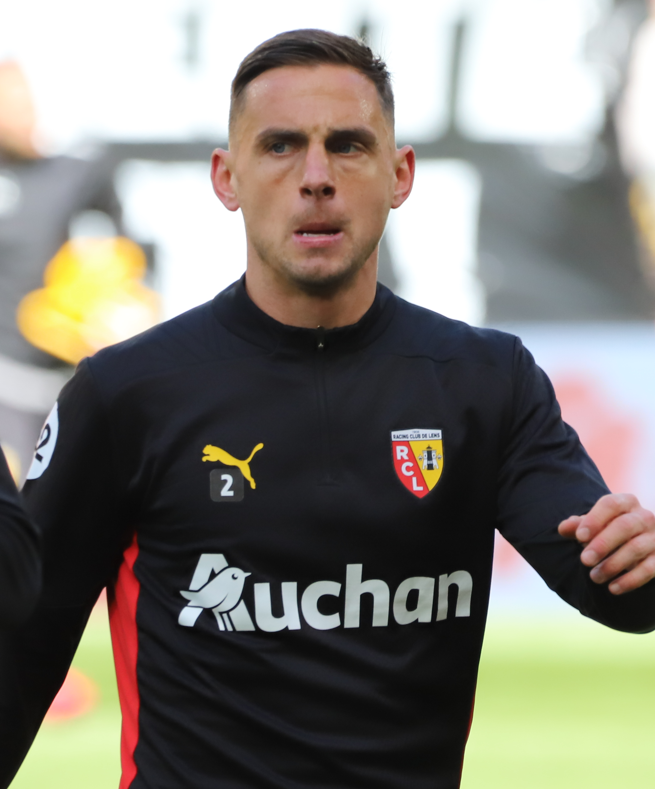
- Aguilar with Lens in 2025

Personal information
- Full name: Ruben Aguilar
- Date of birth: 26 April 1993 (age 33)
- Place of birth: Grenoble, France
- Height: 1.70 m (5 ft 7 in)
- Position: Right-back

Team information
- Current team: Lens
- Number: 2

Youth career
- 1999–2005: Saint-Siméon-de-Bressieux SP
- 2005–2011: Grenoble
- 2011–2013: Saint-Étienne

Senior career*
Years	Team	Apps	(Gls)
2011–2013	Saint-Étienne B	39	(1)
2013–2014	Grenoble	16	(0)
2014–2017	Auxerre	81	(0)
2015	Auxerre B	1	(0)
2017–2019	Montpellier	60	(1)
2019–2023	Monaco	100	(1)
2023–	Lens	75	(5)

International career
2020	France	1	(0)
- * Club domestic league appearances and goals as of 30 October 2026

Ruben Aguilar (born 26 April 1993) is a French professional footballer who plays as a right-back for Ligue 1 club Lens.

== Early life ==
Ruben Aguilar was born on 26 April 1993 in Grenoble, Isère.

== Club career ==
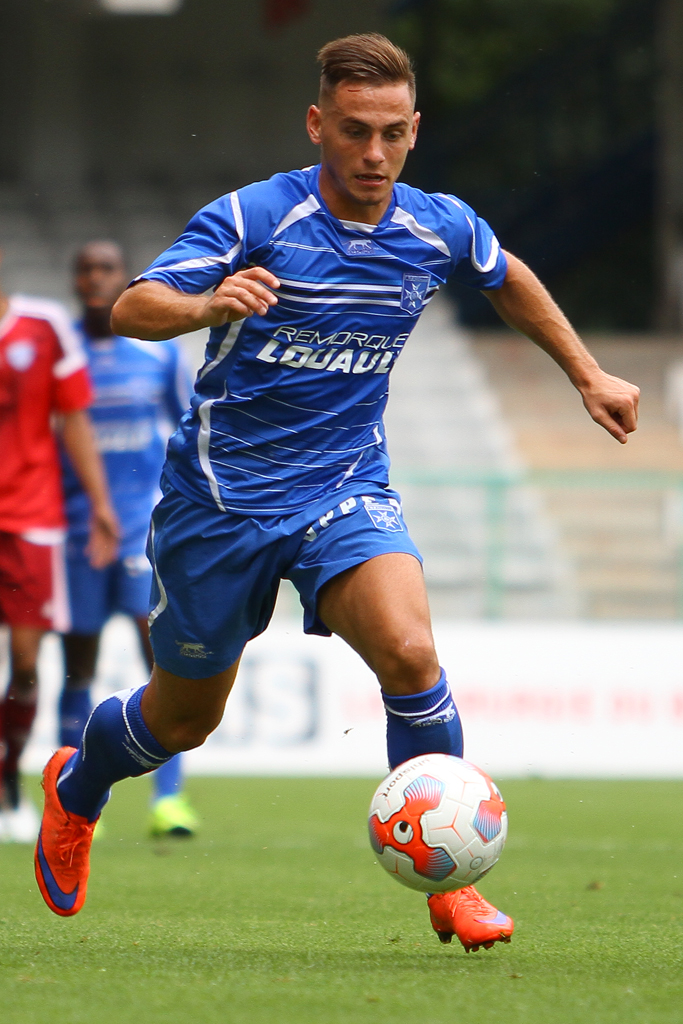
Aguilar playing for Auxerre in 2015

Aguilar joined Auxerre in 2014 from Grenoble. He made his Ligue 2 debut on 1 August 2014 against Le Havre in a 2–0 home win. In the 2016–17 season, he played 30 league matches for the club.

In May 2017, Aguilar signed with Montpellier. On 6 August 2019, he joined Monaco on a five-year deal.

== International career ==
On 9 November 2020, Aguilar was called-up to the France national team for the first time, having previously never played for France at any level.

== Personal life ==
Aguilar was born in Grenoble, Isère to a French mother and a Spanish father. He was once called to the Bolivia national team even though he has no Bolivian descent, due to a Football Manager database mismatch.

== Career statistics ==
=== Club ===
As of match played 30 October 2026

Appearances and goals by club, season and competition
Club	Season	League			Coupe de France		Coupe de la Ligue		Europe		Other		Total	
Club	Season	Division	Apps	Goals	Apps	Goals	Apps	Goals	Apps	Goals	Apps	Goals	Apps	Goals
Saint-Étienne B	2011–12	CFA	15	1	–		–		–		–		15	1
Saint-Étienne B	2012–13	CFA	24	0	–		–		–		–		24	0
Saint-Étienne B	Total		39	1	–		–		–		–		39	1
Grenoble	2013–14	CFA	16	0	0	0	–		–		–		16	0
Auxerre	2014–15	Ligue 2	29	0	6	0	3	0	–		–		38	0
Auxerre	2015–16	Ligue 2	22	0	0	0	0	0	–		–		22	0
Auxerre	2016–17	Ligue 2	30	0	4	1	1	0	–		–		35	1
Auxerre	Total		81	0	10	1	4	0	–		–		95	1
Auxerre B	2015–16	CFA	1	0	–		–		–		–		1	0
Montpellier	2017–18	Ligue 1	31	0	3	0	4	0	–		–		38	0
Montpellier	2018–19	Ligue 1	29	1	1	0	0	0	–		–		30	1
Montpellier	Total		60	1	4	0	4	0	–		–		68	1
Monaco	2019–20	Ligue 1	19	0	2	0	2	1	–		–		23	1
Monaco	2020–21	Ligue 1	33	1	5	1	—		—		38	2		
Monaco	2021–22	Ligue 1	28	0	3	0	–		8 (Note: Two appearances in UEFA Champions League, six appearances in UEFA Europa League)	0	–		39	0
Monaco	2022–23	Ligue 1	20	0	1	0	–		2 (Note: Appearances in UEFA Europa League)	0	–		23	0
Monaco	Total		100	1	11	1	2	1	10	0	–		123	3
Lens	2023–24	Ligue 1	25	1	1	0	–		2 (Note: Appearance in UEFA Europa League)	0	–		28	1
Lens	2024–25	Ligue 1	16	1	0	0	–		0	0	–!!16		1	
Lens	2025–26	Ligue 1	26	2	3	0	–		–		–		29	2
Lens	2026–27	Ligue 1	8	1	0	0	–		3 (Note: Appearances in UEFA Champions League)	0	1 (Note: Appearance in Trophée des Champions)	0	12	1
Lens	Total		75	5	4	0	–		5	0	1	0	85	5
Career total			372	8	29	2	10	1	15	0	1	0	427	11

=== International ===
As of match played 11 November 2020

Appearances and goals by national team and year
National team	Year	Apps	Goals
France	2020	1	0
Total		1	0

== Honours ==
Lens

- Coupe de France: 2025–26
- Trophée des Champions: 2026
