= Junior Sambia =

Central African footballer (born 1996)

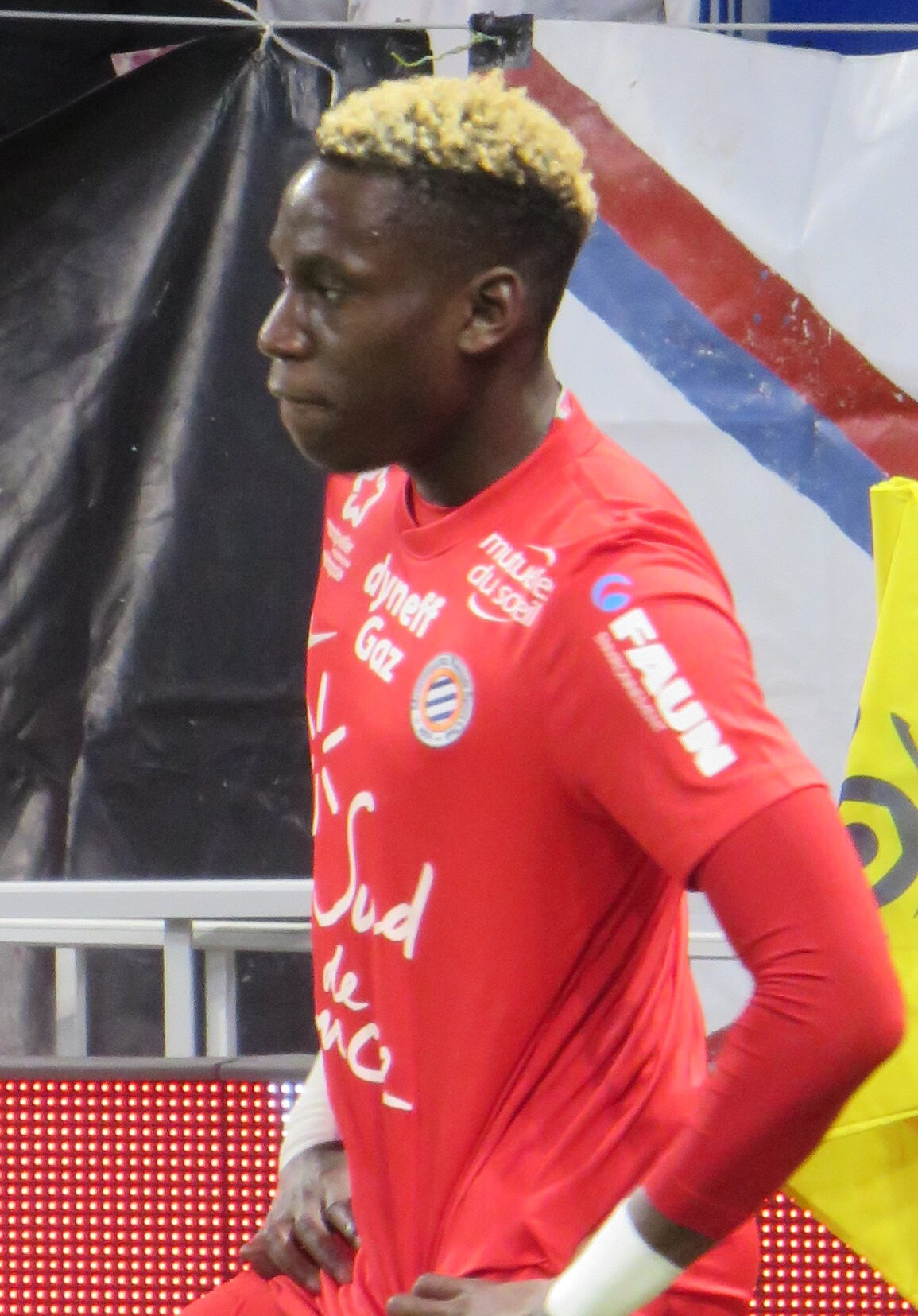
- Sambia with Montpellier in 2017

Personal information
- Full name: Salomon Sambia
- Date of birth: 7 September 1996 (age 30)
- Place of birth: Vaulx-en-Velin, France
- Height: 1.81 m (5 ft 11 in)
- Positions: Right-back; defensive midfielder; winger

Team information
- Current team: Clermont
- Number: 10

Youth career
- 2003–2011: Lyon
- 2011–2013: Mâcon
- 2013–2014: Chamois Niortais

Senior career*
Years	Team	Apps	(Gls)
2014–2018	Chamois Niortais	76	(6)
2017–2018	→ Montpellier (loan)	28	(1)
2015–2016	Chamois Niortais B	5	(0)
2018–2019	Montpellier B	7	(1)
2018–2022	Montpellier	113	(3)
2022–2025	Salernitana	40	(1)
2024–2025	→ Empoli (loan)	17	(0)
2026–	Clermont	5	(0)

International career^{‡}
2026–	Central African Republic	1	(0)
- * Club domestic league appearances and goals as of 4 September 2026 ‡ National team caps and goals as of 0:57, 7 June 2026 (UTC)

Salomon Sambia (born 7 September 1996), commonly known as Junior Sambia, is a professional footballer who plays for Ligue 2 club Clermont. He plays predominantly as a right back, but can also play as a defensive midfielder or winger. Born in France, he represents the Central African Republic national team.

== Career ==
=== Chamois Niortais ===
Born in Lyon, Sambia joined the youth set-up at Niort from Mâcon in 2013. In the summer of 2014, he was awarded a first-team contract alongside fellow youth midfielder Antoine Batisse. Sambia made his senior debut for Niort on 12 September 2014 in the 1–0 defeat to Dijon at the age of 18 years and 5 days, becoming the youngest player ever to start a professional match for the club. He went on to make five league appearances in total during the 2014–15 season.

=== Montpellier ===
In August 2017, Sambia joined Montpellier on a one-year loan with an option to buy. The option would eventually be exercised at the end of the 2017–18 season. In May 2022, his exit from Montpellier at the end of the 2021–22 season was confirmed.

=== Salernitana ===
On 19 July 2022, Sambia signed a four-year contract with Salernitana in Italy.

On 30 August 2024, Sambia was loaned by Empoli.

On 11 July 2025, Sambia's contract was Salernitana was mutually terminated.

== International career ==
Born in France, Sambia is of Central African descent. He was called up to the Central African Republic national team for a set of friendlies in June 2026.

== Personal life ==
In April 2020, Sambia was hospitalised after becoming ill and unconscious and was treated in intensive care. He tested positive for COVID-19 and was placed into an artificial coma. However, he eventually recovered.

== Career statistics ==
As of match played 25 May 2025

Appearance and goals by club, season and competition
Club	Season	League			Cup		Other		Total	
Club	Season	Division	Apps	Goals	Apps	Goals	Apps	Goals	Apps	Goals
Chamois Niortais	2014–15	Ligue 2	5	0	0	0	0	0	5	0
Chamois Niortais	2015–16	Ligue 2	31	2	4	0	0	0	35	2
Chamois Niortais	2016–17	Ligue 2	37	4	4	0	1 (Note: Appearance(s) in the Coupe de la Ligue)	0	42	4
Chamois Niortais	2017–18	Ligue 2	3	0	0	0	1	0	4	0
Chamois Niortais	Total		76	6	8	0	2	0	86	6
Chamois Niortais B	2015–16	CFA 2	5	0	—		—		5	0
Montpellier (loan)	2017–18	Ligue 1	28	1	2	1	4	1	34	3
Montpellier	2018–19	Ligue 1	30	0	1	0	1	0	32	0
Montpellier	2019–20	Ligue 1	17	1	3	0	2	0	22	1
Montpellier	2020–21	Ligue 1	36	1	5	0	—		41	1
Montpellier	2021–22	Ligue 1	30	1	3	0	—		33	1
Montpellier	Total		141	4	14	1	7	1	162	6
Montpellier B	2017–18	National 3	1	0	—		—		1	0
Montpellier B	2018–19	National 3	3	0	—		—		3	0
Montpellier B	2019–20	National 2	3	1	—		—		3	1
Montpellier B			7	1	—		—		7	1
Salernitana	2022–23	Serie A	22	0	0	0	0	0	22	0
Salernitana	2023–24	Serie A	18	1	2	0	0	0	20	1
Salernitana	Total		40	1	2	0	0	0	42	1
Empoli	2024–25	Serie A	17	0	5	0	—		22	0
Career total			286	12	29	1	9	1	324	14
