= Pedro Mendes (footballer, born October 1990) =

Portuguese footballer (born 1990)

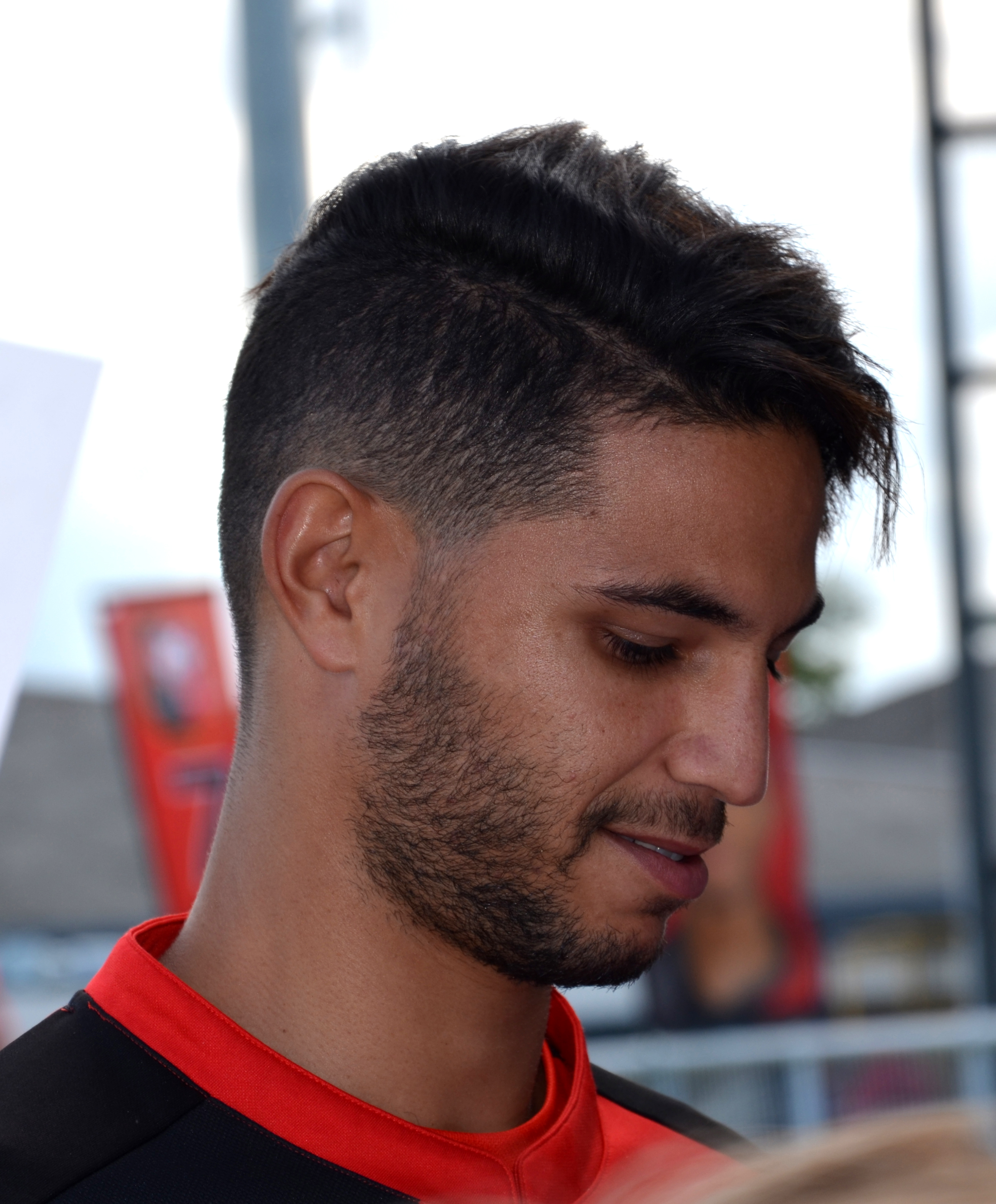
- Mendes with Rennes in 2015

Personal information
- Full name: Pedro Filipe Teodósio Mendes
- Date of birth: 1 October 1990 (age 36)
- Place of birth: Neuchâtel, Switzerland
- Height: 1.86 m (6 ft 1 in)
- Position: Centre-back

Youth career
- 1998–2005: Real Massamá
- 2005–2009: Sporting CP

Senior career*
| Years | Team | Apps | (Gls) |
| 2009–2013 | Sporting CP | 3 | (0) |
| 2009–2010 | → Real Massamá (loan) | 22 | (0) |
| 2010–2011 | → Servette (loan) | 15 | (0) |
| 2011–2012 | → Real Madrid B (loan) | 23 | (1) |
| 2011 | → Real Madrid (loan) | 0 | (0) |
| 2012–2013 | Sporting CP B | 31 | (1) |
| 2013–2014 | Parma | 6 | (0) |
| 2014 | Sassuolo | 9 | (0) |
| 2014–2015 | Parma | 21 | (0) |
| 2015–2017 | Rennes | 41 | (0) |
| 2017–2023 | Montpellier | 105 | (5) |
| 2021–2023 | Montpellier B | 4 | (0) |
| 2023–2024 | Estrela Amadora | 13 | (0) |
| 2025–2026 | Dila | 22 | (1) |
| 2026 | Feirense | 5 | (0) |
| Total | | 320 | (8) |

International career
| 2006–2007 | Portugal U17 | 10 | (0) |
| 2007–2008 | Portugal U18 | 6 | (0) |
| 2008–2009 | Portugal U19 | 16 | (0) |
| 2009–2010 | Portugal U20 | 5 | (0) |
| 2011–2012 | Portugal U21 | 13 | (1) |
| 2018 | Portugal | 1 | (0) |
- * Club domestic league appearances and goals

Pedro Filipe Teodósio Mendes (born 1 October 1990) is a former professional footballer who played as a central defender. Born in Switzerland, he represented Portugal internationally.

== Club career ==
=== Sporting CP ===
Born in Neuchâtel, Switzerland to Portuguese parents, Mendes reached Sporting CP's youth system in 2005, aged 14. In his first two senior seasons he played with Real SC (third division) and Servette FC (Swiss Challenge League), in both cases on loan, helping the latter club to promotion.

In the summer of 2011, still owned by Sporting, Mendes joined Real Madrid, being assigned to the B team. He made his debut with the main squad on 7 December, coming on as a substitute for Álvaro Arbeloa midway through the second half of a 3–0 away win against AFC Ajax in the group stage of the UEFA Champions League; during his spell at the Santiago Bernabéu Stadium, several of his Castilla teammates expressed their dissatisfaction over what they saw as a preferential treatment by first-team manager José Mourinho, the player's compatriot.

Mendes played his first match in the Primeira Liga with Sporting on 27 January 2013, when he replaced the injured Khalid Boulahrouz at half-time of the 1–1 home draw with Vitória de Guimarães.

=== Parma ===
Returning to Sporting for the 2012–13 campaign, Mendes was made captain of the reserves who competed in the Segunda Liga, also appearing sporadically for the main squad. On 28 May 2013, he signed a five-year contract with Parma F.C. in Serie A as a free agent.

On 21 January 2014, Mendes moved to fellow top-tier club US Sassuolo Calcio in a co-ownership deal with Parma. In June he was bought by the latter, who sold Raman Chibsah and Nicola Sansone to the former on the same day.

=== Rennes ===
Mendes joined Stade Rennais F.C. of France on 6 July 2015, after agreeing to a four-year contract. He made his debut in Ligue 1 on 8 August, in a 2–1 away loss to SC Bastia.

=== Montpellier ===
On 18 July 2017, Mendes signed with Montpellier HSC of the same league. He first appeared for them on 5 August, playing the entire 1–0 home victory over Stade Malherbe Caen, and scored his first goal on 16 September by heading from the corner kick as the visitors defeated ES Troyes AC by the same score.

Mendes became a key part of Michel Der Zakarian's resolute Montpellier side over the following seasons, partnering veterans Daniel Congré and Hilton in a three-man central defence. In October 2018, he extended his contract for two more years up to 2023.

Mendes featured rarely in his final two years at the Stade de la Mosson, due to an anterior cruciate ligament injury contracted in April 2021. In an interview to Portuguese website Zerozero, he blasted the club's medical staff over his recovery process.

=== Later career ===
On 24 August 2023, Mendes returned to Portugal one decade after leaving, joining C.F. Estrela da Amadora who had just returned to the top flight following a lengthy absence; the terms of the deal were not disclosed. In June 2024, he left.

In February 2025, Mendes moved to the Georgian Erovnuli Liga with FC Dila Gori. Eleven months later, the 35-year-old joined Portuguese second-tier side C.D. Feirense on a contract until the end of the season.

Mendes announced his retirement in July 2026.

== International career ==
Mendes won exactly 50 caps for Portugal at youth level, including 13 for the under-21 team for whom he scored in a 1–1 home draw against Poland for the 2013 UEFA European Championship qualifiers. He made his only full appearance on 14 October 2018, when he replaced S.L. Benfica's Rúben Dias in the 56th minute of the 3–1 friendly win over Scotland at Hampden Park.

== Career statistics ==
As of match played 26 November 2025

Appearances and goals by club, season and competition
| Club | Season | League | | | National cup (Note: Includes Taça de Portugal, Coppa Italia and Coupe de France) | | League cup (Note: Includes Coupe de la Ligue) | | Continental | | Total | |
| Club | Season | Division | Apps | Goals | Apps | Goals | Apps | Goals | Apps | Goals | Apps | Goals |
|---|---|---|---|---|---|---|---|---|---|---|---|---|
| Real Massamá (loan) | 2009–10 | Segunda Divisão | 22 | 0 | 2 | 1 | — | | — | | 24 | 1 |
| Servette (loan) | 2010–11 | Challenge League | 15 | 0 | 0 | 0 | — | | — | | 15 | 0 |
| Real Madrid B (loan) | 2011–12 | Segunda División B | 23 | 1 | — | | — | | — | | 23 | 1 |
| Real Madrid (loan) | 2011–12 | La Liga | 0 | 0 | 0 | 0 | — | | 1 (Note: Appearance in UEFA Champions League) | 0 | 1 | 0 |
| Sporting CP | 2012–13 | Primeira Liga | 3 | 0 | 0 | 0 | 0 | 0 | 0 | 0 | 3 | 0 |
| Sporting CP B | 2012–13 | Segunda Liga | 31 | 1 | — | | — | | — | | 31 | 1 |
| Parma | 2013–14 | Serie A | 6 | 0 | 2 | 0 | — | | — | | 8 | 0 |
| Sassuolo | 2013–14 | Serie A | 9 | 0 | 0 | 0 | — | | — | | 9 | 0 |
| Parma | 2014–15 | Serie A | 21 | 0 | 2 | 0 | — | | — | | 23 | 0 |
| Rennes | 2015–16 | Ligue 1 | 22 | 0 | 0 | 0 | 2 | 0 | — | | 24 | 0 |
| Rennes | 2016–17 | Ligue 1 | 19 | 0 | 1 | 0 | 0 | 0 | — | | 20 | 0 |
| Rennes | Total | | 41 | 0 | 1 | 0 | 2 | 0 | — | | 44 | 0 |
| Montpellier | 2017–18 | Ligue 1 | 34 | 1 | 3 | 0 | 2 | 0 | — | | 39 | 1 |
| Montpellier | 2018–19 | Ligue 1 | 31 | 1 | 0 | 0 | 1 | 0 | — | | 32 | 1 |
| Montpellier | 2019–20 | Ligue 1 | 16 | 1 | 0 | 0 | 2 | 0 | — | | 18 | 1 |
| Montpellier | 2020–21 | Ligue 1 | 22 | 2 | 2 | 0 | — | | — | | 24 | 2 |
| Montpellier | 2021–22 | Ligue 1 | 1 | 0 | 0 | 0 | — | | — | | 1 | 0 |
| Montpellier | 2022–23 | Ligue 1 | 1 | 0 | 0 | 0 | — | | — | | 1 | 0 |
| Montpellier | Total | | 105 | 5 | 5 | 0 | 5 | 0 | — | | 115 | 5 |
| Montpellier B | 2021–22 | Championnat National 2 | 1 | 0 | — | | — | | — | | 1 | 0 |
| Montpellier B | 2022–23 | Championnat National 3 | 3 | 0 | — | | — | | — | | 3 | 0 |
| Montpellier B | Total | | 4 | 0 | — | | — | | — | | 4 | 0 |
| Estrela Amadora | 2023–24 | Primeira Liga | 13 | 0 | 0 | 0 | 0 | 0 | — | | 13 | 0 |
| Dila | 2025 | Erovnuli Liga | 22 | 1 | 3 | 0 | 0 | 0 | — | | 25 | 1 |
| Career total | | | 315 | 8 | 15 | 1 | 7 | 0 | 1 | 0 | 338 | 9 |

== Honours ==
Real Madrid Castilla

- Segunda División B: 2011–12

Dila

- Georgian Cup: 2025
