= Benjamin Lecomte =

French footballer (born 1991)

- Lecomte with Fulham in 2026

Personal information
- Full name: Benjamin Pascal Lecomte
- Date of birth: 26 April 1991 (age 35)
- Place of birth: Paris, France
- Height: 1.87 m (6 ft 2 in)
- Position: Goalkeeper

Team information
- Current team: Fulham
- Number: 23

Youth career
- 1997–2005: Arcueil Municipal
- 2005–2006: Antony Sports
- 2006–2010: Chamois Niortais

Senior career*
Years	Team	Apps	(Gls)
2010–2012	Lorient B	22	(0)
2010–2017	Lorient	119	(0)
2013–2014	→ Dijon (loan)	31	(0)
2017–2019	Montpellier	75	(0)
2019–2023	Monaco	56	(0)
2021–2022	→ Atlético Madrid (loan)	0	(0)
2022–2023	→ Espanyol (loan)	10	(0)
2023–2025	Montpellier	79	(0)
2025–	Fulham	0	(0)

International career
2009	France U19	4	(0)
2011	France U20	2	(0)
- * Club domestic league appearances and goals as of 25 May 2025

Benjamin Pascal Lecomte (born 26 April 1991) is a French professional footballer who plays as a goalkeeper for Premier League club Fulham.

== Early life ==
Lecomte was born in Paris.

== Club career ==
=== Lorient ===
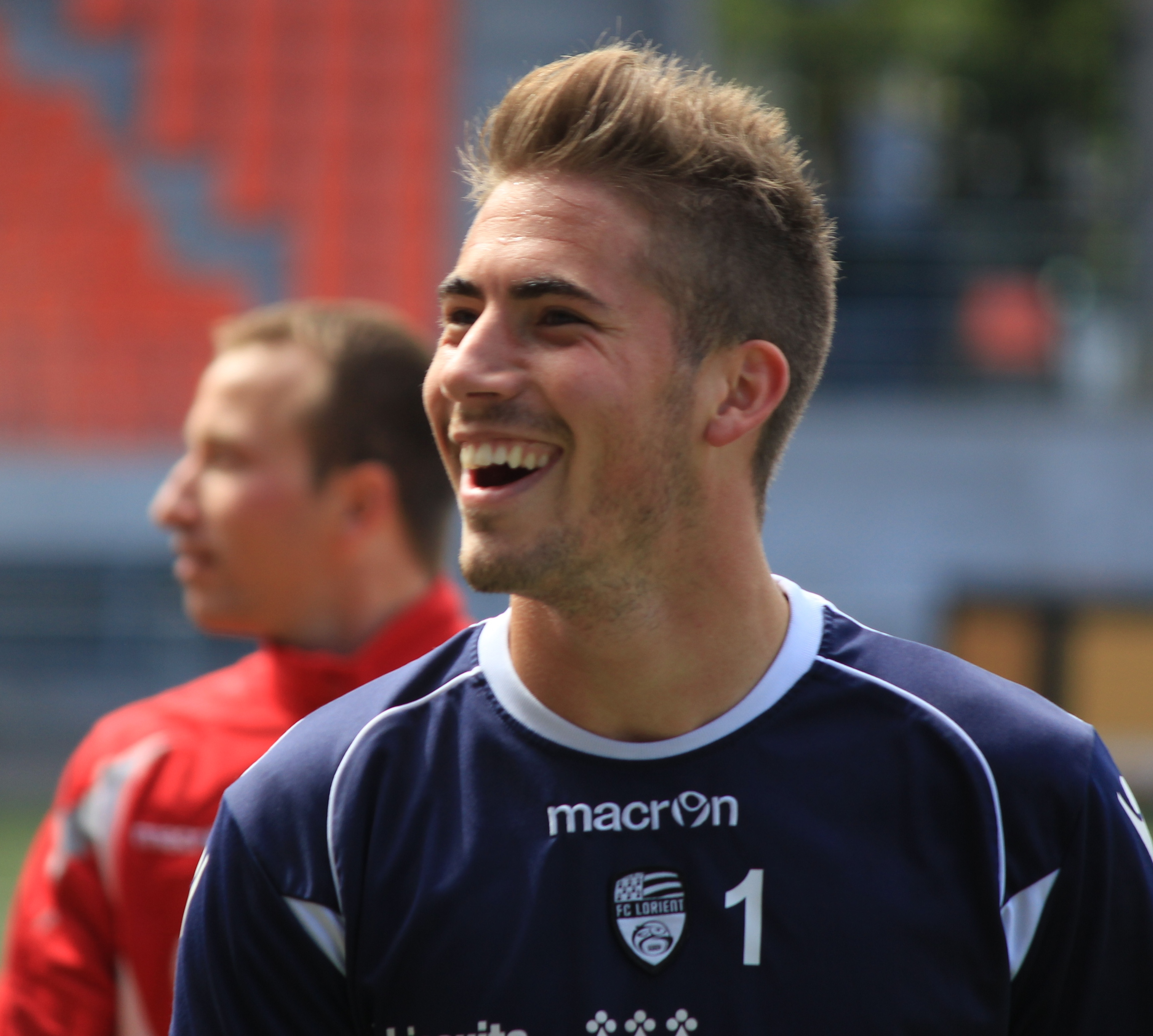
Lecomte with Lorient during training in 2013

On 26 October 2010, Lecomte made his professional debut for Lorient in a Coupe de la Ligue against Monaco. Lorient lost the match 5–3 on penalties. On 20 January 2011, Lecomte signed his first professional contract after agreeing to a three-year deal with Lorient.

=== Montpellier ===
On 29 June 2017, Lecomte signed with Ligue 1 side Montpellier after Lorient was relegated.

=== Monaco ===
On 15 July 2019, Lecomte signed with Monaco on a five-year deal.

==== Loan in Spain ====
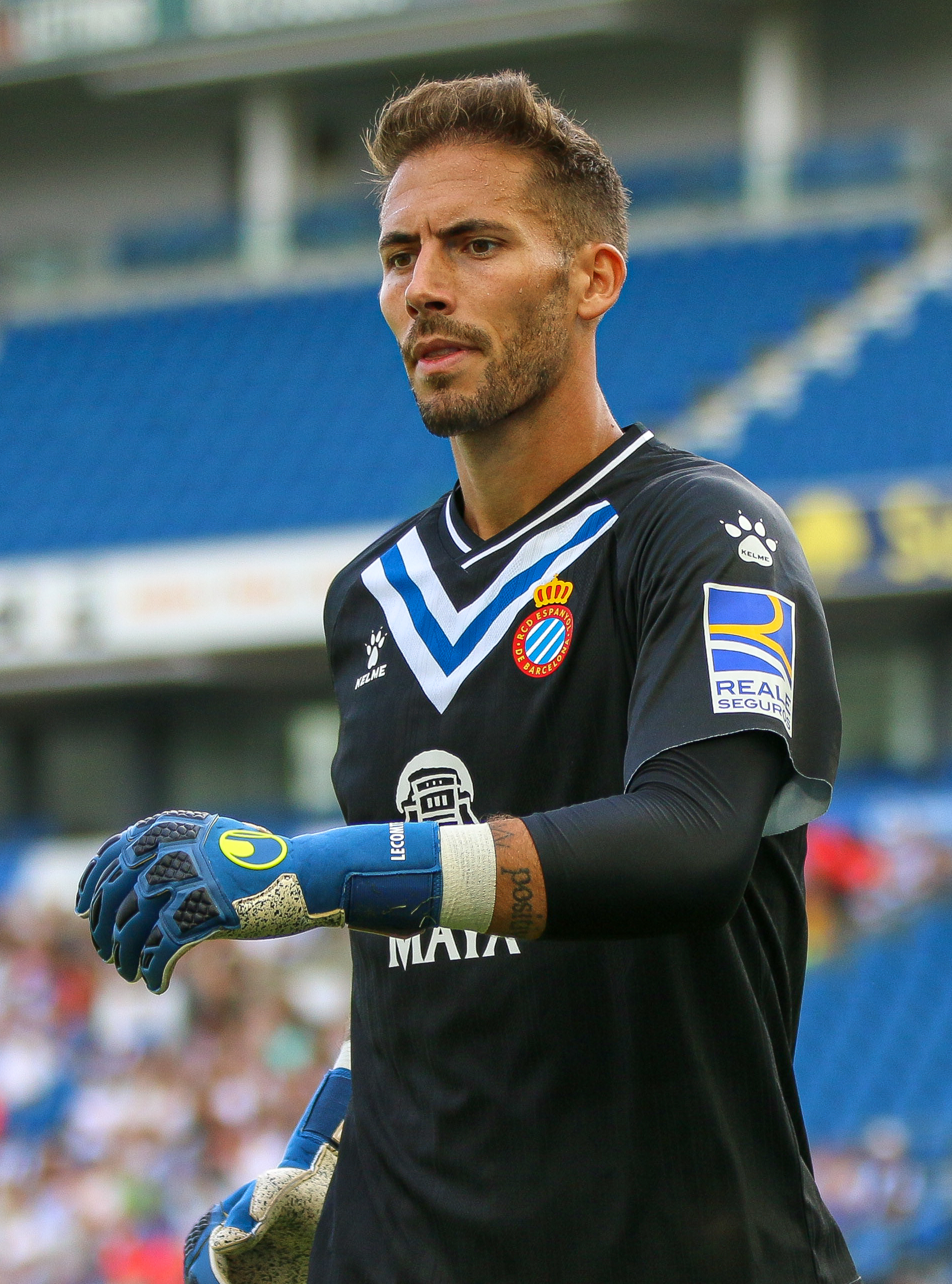
Lecomte playing for Espanyol in 2022

On 20 August 2021, Lecomte moved abroad for the first time in his career, signing a one-year loan deal with La Liga defending champions Atlético Madrid. However, despite the club playing in three major tournaments with a somewhat busy schedule, he spent all 51 games of the season on the bench as a substitute for Jan Oblak.

On 13 July 2022, Lecomte signed with La Liga side Espanyol on a season-long loan.

=== Return to Montpellier ===
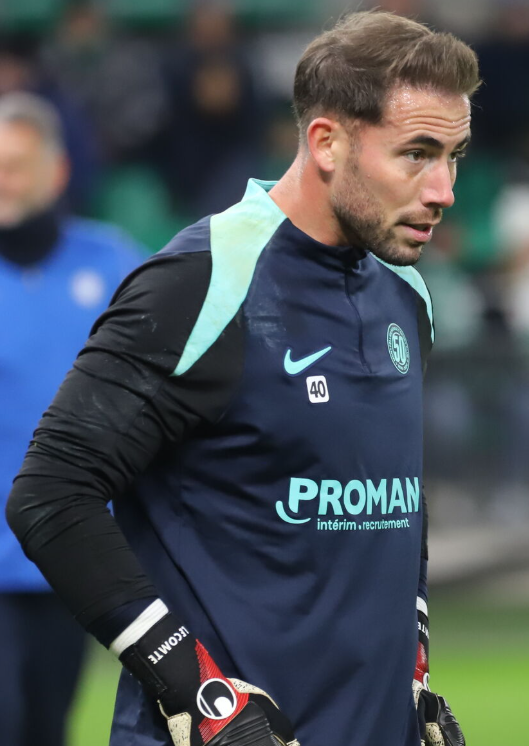
Lecomte with Montpellier in 2024

On 26 January 2023, Lecomte returned to Montpellier for a transfer fee in the region of €3 million. He chose the club's number 40 jersey.

=== Fulham ===
On 26 July 2025, Lecomte joined Premier League club Fulham on a two-year deal.

== International career ==
Lecomte was a French youth international and has served as the goalkeeper at under-19 and under-20 levels. On 3 September 2018, Lecomte was called up to the senior France squad for the first time to face Germany and the Netherlands after captain Hugo Lloris was ruled out due to injury.

== Career statistics ==
As of match played 28 October 2026

Appearances and goals by club, season and competition
Club	Season	League			National cup (Note: Includes Coupe de France, FA Cup)		League cup (Note: Includes Coupe de la Ligue, EFL Cup)		Europe		Other		Total	
Club	Season	Division	Apps	Goals	Apps	Goals	Apps	Goals	Apps	Goals	Apps	Goals	Apps	Goals
Lorient B	2010–11	CFA	17	0	—		—		—		—		17	0
Lorient B	2011–12	CFA	3	0	—		—		—		—		3	0
Lorient B	2012–13	CFA	2	0	—		—		—		—		2	0
Lorient B	Total		22	0	—		—		—		—		22	0
Lorient	2010–11	Ligue 1	2	0	0	0	1	0	—		—		3	0
Lorient	2011–12	Ligue 1	5	0	0	0	3	0	—		—		8	0
Lorient	2012–13	Ligue 1	5	0	5	0	1	0	—		—		11	0
Lorient	2013–14	Ligue 1	1	0	—		—		—		—		1	0
Lorient	2014–15	Ligue 1	38	0	1	0	0	0	—		—		39	0
Lorient	2015–16	Ligue 1	37	0	5	0	0	0	—		—		42	0
Lorient	2016–17	Ligue 1	31	0	3	0	0	0	—		2 (Note: Appearances in Ligue 1 relegation play-offs)	0	36	0
Lorient	Total		119	0	14	0	5	0	—		2	0	140	0
Dijon (loan)	2013–14	Ligue 2	31	0	0	0	—		—		—		31	0
Montpellier	2017–18	Ligue 1	38	0	2	0	1	0	—		—		41	0
Montpellier	2018–19	Ligue 1	37	0	1	0	0	0	—		—		38	0
Montpellier	Total		75	0	3	0	1	0	—		—		79	0
Monaco	2019–20	Ligue 1	28	0	3	0	1	0	—		—		32	0
Monaco	2020–21	Ligue 1	28	0	0	0	—		—		—		28	0
Monaco	Total		56	0	3	0	1	0	—		—		60	0
Atlético Madrid (loan)	2021–22	La Liga	0	0	0	0	—		0	0	0	0	0	0
Espanyol (loan)	2022–23	La Liga	10	0	0	0	—		—		—		10	0
Montpellier	2022–23	Ligue 1	19	0	—		—		—		—		19	0
Montpellier	2023–24	Ligue 1	30	0	3	0	—		—		—		33	0
Montpellier	2024–25	Ligue 1	30	0	0	0	—		—		—		30	0
Montpellier	Total		79	0	3	0	—		—		—		82	0
Fulham	2025–26	Premier League	0	0	3	0	4	0	—		—		7	0
Fulham	2026–27	Premier League	0	0	0	0	2	0	—		—		2	0
Fulham	Total		0	0	3	0	6	0	—		—		9	0
Career total			392	0	26	0	13	0	0	0	2	0	433	0
