= Isaac Mbenza =

Footballer (born 1996)

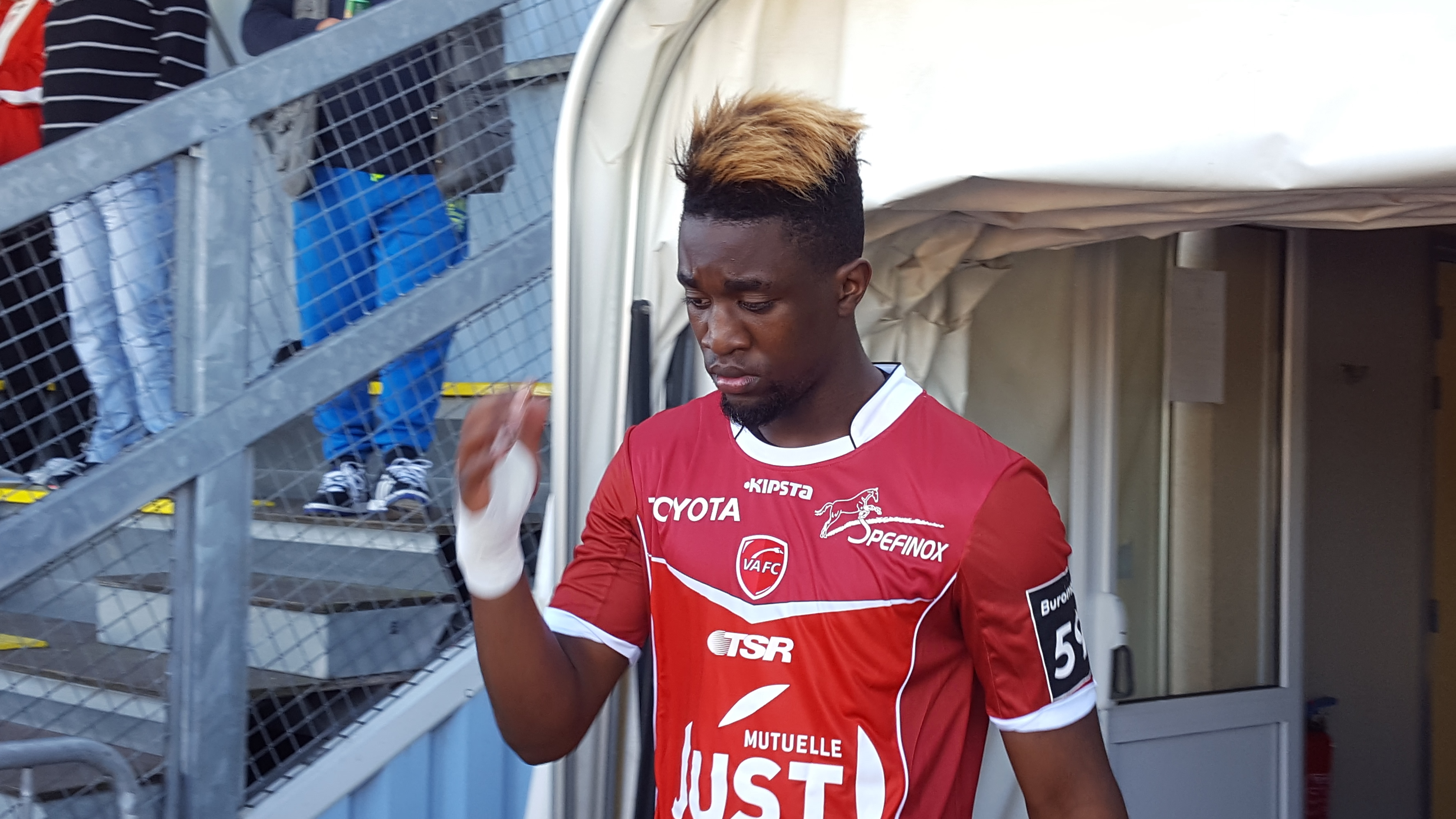
- Mbenza in 2016

Personal information
- Full name: Isaac Mbenza
- Date of birth: 8 March 1996 (age 30)
- Place of birth: Saint-Denis, France
- Height: 1.87 m (6 ft 2 in)
- Position: Forward

Team information
- Current team: Al-Yarmouk

Youth career
- 2005-2011: ROFC Stockel
- 2011-2012: FC Brussels
- 2012-2013: KV Mechelen

Senior career*
Years	Team	Apps	(Gls)
2013–2016	Valenciennes B	30	(3)
2015–2016	Valenciennes	48	(7)
2016–2017	Standard Liège	21	(1)
2017–2019	Montpellier	54	(11)
2018–2019	→ Huddersfield Town (loan)	22	(1)
2019–2021	Huddersfield Town	41	(5)
2020	→ Amiens SC (loan)	3	(0)
2021–2022	Qatar SC	10	(0)
2022–2026	Charleroi	92	(8)
2026–	Al-Yarmouk	0	(0)

International career
2013	Belgium U17	2	(0)
2015	Belgium U19	1	(0)
2017–2019	Belgium U21	16	(2)
- * Club domestic league appearances and goals as of 22 March 2026

Isaac Mbenza (born 8 March 1996) is a professional footballer who plays as a forward for Kuwaiti club Al-Yarmouk. Born in France and eligible to represent DR Congo and Belgium, he has represented the latter at several youth levels.

== Personal life ==
Mbenza was born in France and is of Congolese descent, and emigrated to Belgium at 5.

== Club career ==
Mbenza started playing at ROFC Stockel at the age of 9 before moving on at the age of 15 to FC Brussels for a season, followed by another season at KV Mechelen before his move to Valenciennes FC.

=== Montpellier ===
On 31 January 2017, Mbenza signed for French club Montpellier.

=== Huddersfield Town ===
On 9 August 2018, Mbenza moved to Premier League club Huddersfield Town on a season-long loan with the obligation of a transfer in the summer of 2019.

He made his debut as a 68th-minute substitute in a goalless draw with Cardiff City on 25 August 2018. On 5 May 2019, he scored his only goal in the 2018–19 season, coming as a 60th-minute equaliser in the 1–1 draw with Manchester United.

Following Huddersfield's relegation to the EFL Championship, Mbenza's loan was made permanent on 9 July 2019 until the end of 2020–21 season, with the club having the option of a further season.

He only made 6 appearances for Huddersfield in the 2019–20 season, and departed on loan to Amiens on 3 February 2020 for the remainder of the season.

He featured more under the manager, Carlos Corberàn, who had been appointed in advance of 2020–21 season. He made 37 appearances scoring 5 goals, with 3 coming direct from free kicks in games against Birmingham City, Sheffield Wednesday and Middlesbrough.

On 11 May 2021, Huddersfield exercised their option to extend Mbenza's contract up to the end of the 2021–22 season. But on 6 September, his contract was terminated.

=== Charleroi ===
On 14 March 2022, Mbenza signed a three-month contract with Charleroi, with an option to extend.

== Career statistics ==
As of match played on 1 October 2019

Appearances and goals by club, season and competition
Club	Season	League			National cup		League cup		Other		Total	
Club	Season	Division	Apps	Goals	Apps	Goals	Apps	Goals	Apps	Goals	Apps	Goals
Valenciennes B	2013–14	CFA 2	10	1	—		—		—		10	1
Valenciennes B	2014–15	CFA 2	18	2	—		—		—		18	2
Valenciennes B	2015–16	CFA 2	2	0	—		—		—		2	0
Valenciennes B	Total		30	3	0	0	0	0	0	0	30	3
Valenciennes	2014–15	Ligue 2	13	1	0	0	0	0	0	0	13	1
Valenciennes	2015–16	Ligue 2	35	6	2	0	1	0	0	0	38	6
Valenciennes	Total		48	7	2	0	1	0	0	0	51	7
Standard Liège	2016–17	Belgian First Division A	21	1	0	0	—		6	0	27	1
Montpellier	2016–17	Ligue 1	16	3	0	0	0	0	0	0	16	3
Montpellier	2017–18	Ligue 1	38	8	3	1	2	1	0	0	43	10
Montpellier	Total		54	11	3	1	2	1	0	0	59	13
Huddersfield	2018–19	Premier League	22	1	1	0	1	0	0	0	24	1
Huddersfield	2019–20	Championship	5	0	0	0	1	0	0	0	6	0
Huddersfield	Total		27	1	1	0	2	0	0	0	30	1
Career total			170	23	6	1	5	1	6	0	187	25
