= Bryan Passi =

Congolese footballer (born 1997)

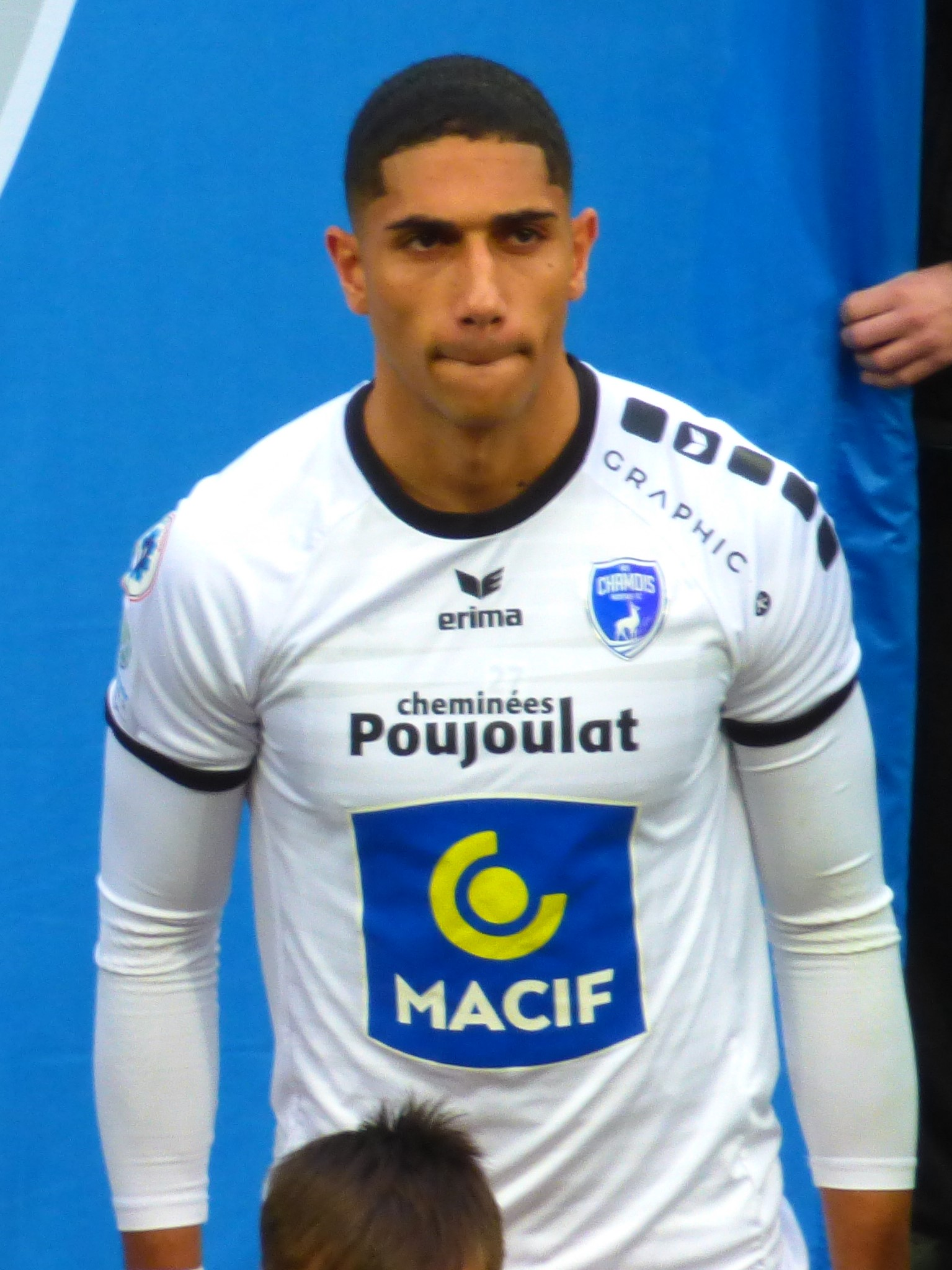
- Passi in 2019

Personal information
- Date of birth: 5 August 1997 (age 29)
- Place of birth: Marseille, France
- Height: 1.89 m (6 ft 2 in)
- Position: Centre-back

Team information
- Current team: Valenciennes
- Number: 5

Youth career
- Montpellier

Senior career*
Years	Team	Apps	(Gls)
2015–2019	Montpellier II	46	(6)
2017–2019	Montpellier	3	(0)
2017–2018	→ Le Havre II (loan)	6	(0)
2019–2022	Niort II	2	(0)
2019–2023	Niort	87	(3)
2023–2024	Hapoel Tel Aviv	28	(1)
2024–2026	Mafra	20	(1)
2026–	Valenciennes	12	(3)

International career^{‡}
2022–	Congo	2	(0)
- * Club domestic league appearances and goals as of 23 June 2026 ‡ National team caps and goals as of 6 November 2023

Bryan Passi (born 5 August 1997) is a professional footballer who plays as a centre-back for Ligue 3 club Valenciennes. Born in France, he plays for the Congo national team.

== Career ==
Passi made his professional debut for Montpellier in a 2–0 Ligue 1 loss against Metz on 21 January 2017. He signed his first professional contract on 14 February 2017.

On 31 August 2017, the last day of the summer transfer window, Passi joined Le Havre of Ligue 2 on loan for the 2017–18 season. The deal included an option for Le Havre to sign him permanently.

== International career ==
Passi is of Congolese descent. He was called up to the Congo national team for a set of friendlies in September 2022. He debuted with the Congo in a 3–3 friendly tie with Madagascar on 24 September 2022.

== Personal life ==
Passi comes from a family of footballers. His paternal grandfather, Camille Passi, was a Congolese former footballer, and coach in his later career. His father, Franck Passi, is a former professional footballer who also played for Montpellier. His uncle, Gérald Passi, was also a professional footballer who played for the France national team.

== Career statistics ==
As of matches played 1 June 2024.

Appearances and goals by club, season and competition
Club	Season	League			Cup		League Cup		Other		Total	
Club	Season	Division	Apps	Goals	Apps	Goals	Apps	Goals	Apps	Goals	Apps	Goals
Montpellier	2016–17	Ligue 1	3	0	0	0	0	0	—		3	0
Montpellier	2017–18	Ligue 1	0	0	0	0	0	0	—		0	0
Montpellier	2018–19	Ligue 1	0	0	0	0	0	0	—		0	0
Montpellier	Total		3	0	0	0	0	0	—		3	0
Le Havre (loan)	2017–18	Ligue 2	0	0	0	0	0	0	—		0	0
Niort	2019–20	Ligue 2	12	0	2	0	3	0	—		17	0
Niort	2020–21	Ligue 2	28	1	0	0	— (Note: The Coupe de la Ligue was indefinitely suspended following the 2019–20 edition)		1 (Note: Matches played in the 2020–21 Ligue 2 relegation playoffs)	0	29	1
Niort	2021–22	Ligue 2	28	1	— (Note: Niort excluded from the 2021–22 Coupe de France)		—		—		28	1
Niort	2022–23	Ligue 2	19	1	3	0	—		—		22	1
Niort	Total		87	3	5	0	3	0	1	0	96	3
Hapoel Tel Aviv	2023–24	Israeli Premier League	28	1	1	0	5	0	—		34	1
Mafra	2024–25	Liga Portugal 2	0	0	0	0	0	0	—		0	0
Career total			116	4	6	0	8	0	1	0	133	4
