= Killian Sanson =

French footballer (born 1997)

Personal information
- Full name: Killian Morgan Sanson
- Date of birth: 7 June 1997 (age 29)
- Place of birth: Saint-Doulchard, France
- Height: 1.73 m (5 ft 8 in)
- Position: Attacking midfielder

Team information
- Current team: FC Chauray
- Number: 11

Youth career
- –2013: Le Mans
- 2013–2016: Evian

Senior career*
Years	Team	Apps	(Gls)
2015–2016	Evian	4	(0)
2016–2020	Montpellier B	44	(11)
2016–2020	Montpellier	1	(0)
2019–2020	→ Quevilly-Rouen (loan)	21	(3)
2019–2020	→ Quevilly-Rouen B (loan)	1	(1)
2020–2021	Thonon Evian	0	(0)
2021–2025	Bourges	82	(16)
2024	Bourges B	1	(0)
2025–	FC Chauray	11	(0)
- * Club domestic league appearances and goals as of 6 December 2025

Killian Sanson (born 7 June 1997) is a French professional footballer who plays as an attacking midfielder for Championnat National 1 club FC Chauray. He has previously played on the professional level with Evian and Montpellier. He is the younger brother of fellow professional footballer Morgan Sanson.

== Club career ==
A youth product of Le Mans, Sanson joined Ligue 1 club Evian in 2013. He made his professional debut for Evian in 2015, in a 2–0 Ligue 2 defeat against Brest.

After Evian were relegated to the fourth-division due to financial issues, Sanson joined Montpellier in July 2016 where he signed his first professional contract, reuniting with his brother Morgan. He made his only Ligue 1 appearance for Montpellier on 20 May 2017, as a second-half substitute in the 2–0 defeat at Angers.

Sanson was loaned by Montpellier to Championnat National side Quevilly-Rouen at the start of the 2019–20 season. He was released by Montpellier at the end of the season, and after having a trial with Neuchâtel Xamax in Switzerland, he signed for the latest incarnation of football in Thonon-les-Bains, Thonon Evian.
