= Khalil Fayad =

French footballer (born 2004)

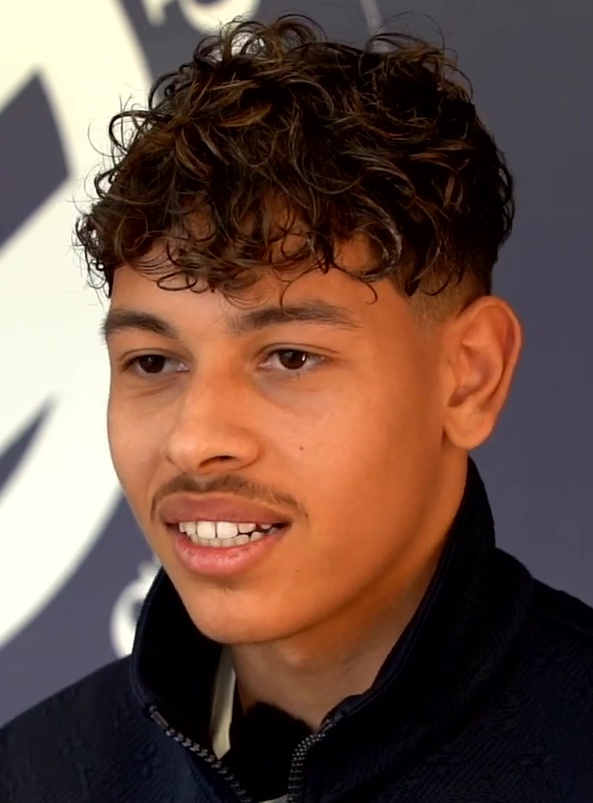
- Fayad in 2023

Personal information
- Date of birth: 9 June 2004 (age 22)
- Place of birth: Montpellier, France
- Height: 1.72 m (5 ft 8 in)
- Position: Midfielder

Team information
- Current team: Hajduk Split
- Number: 8

Youth career
- 2010–2022: Montpellier

Senior career*
Years	Team	Apps	(Gls)
2021–2026	Montpellier B	18	(1)
2022–2026	Montpellier	87	(4)
2026–	Hajduk Split	6	(2)

International career^{‡}
2021	France U18	6	(1)
2022–2023	France U19	7	(0)
2023–2024	France U20	3	(0)
- * Club domestic league appearances and goals as of 26 October 2026 ‡ National team caps and goals as of 25 March 2024

Khalil Fayad (born 9 June 2004) is a French professional footballer who plays as a midfielder for Croatian Football League club Hajduk Split.

== Club career ==
Born in Montpellier, Fayad played all his youth football for local side Montpellier HSC, which he had joined in 2010. He made his professional debut for the club on the 13 August 2022, replacing Joris Chotard during a 5–2 Ligue 1 loss away to Paris Saint-Germain. Fayad delivered the assist for Montpellier's second goal, scored by Enzo Tchato.

On 1 September 2026, Fayad moved to Hajduk Split in Croatia on a three-season contract.

== International career ==
Born in France, Fayad is of Moroccan descent. He is a youth international for France, having played for the France U18s.

== Career statistics ==
As of match played 2 May 2026

Appearances and goals by club, season and competition
Club	Season	League			Coupe de France		Other		Total	
Club	Season	Division	Apps	Goals	Apps	Goals	Apps	Goals	Apps	Goals
Montpellier B	2021–22	CFA 2	15	1	—		—		15	1
Montpellier B	2023–24	National 3	1	0	—		—		1	0
Montpellier B	2024–25	National 3	1	0	—		—		1	0
Montpellier B	2025–26	National 3	1	0	—		—		1	0
Montpellier B	Total		18	1	—		—		18	1
Montpellier	2022–23	Ligue 1	24	0	1	0	—		25	0
Montpellier	2023–24	Ligue 1	23	3	3	0	—		26	3
Montpellier	2024–25	Ligue 1	20	0	1	0	—		21	0
Montpellier	2025–26	Ligue 1	20	1	1	0	—		21	1
Montpellier	Total		87	4	6	0	—		93	4
Career total			105	5	6	0	0	0	111	5
