= 2025–26 Montpellier HSC season =

107th season of Montpellier HSC

Montpellier HSC
2025–26 season
- President: Laurent Nicollin
- Manager: Zoumana Camara
- Stadium: Stade de la Mosson
- Ligue 2: 8th
- Coupe de France: Round of 16
Home colours	Away colours	Third colours

The 2025–26 season was the 107th season in the history of Montpellier HSC, and the club's first season in Ligue 2 since 2009. The team finished in eighth place with 51 points. In addition to the domestic league, Montpellier participated in the Coupe de France, reaching the round of 16.

== Transfers ==
=== In ===
No.	Pos.	Player	Transferred from	Fee	Date	Source
3	DF	(Morocco) Naoufel El Hannach	(France) Paris Saint-Germain	Loan	26 June 2025	
1	GK	(France) Mathieu Michel	(France) Ajaccio	Free	1 July 2025	
15	DF	(France) Julien Laporte	(France) Lorient	Free	1 July 2025	
14	FW	(Nigeria) Victor Orakpo	(France) Nice	Loan	7 July 2025	
7	FW	(France) Nathanaël Mbuku	(Germany) FC Augsburg	Loan (Note: Includes an option to sign permanently for €1.8 million)	8 July 2025	
19	FW	(Guinea-Bissau) Alexandre Mendy	(France) Caen	Undisclosed	11 July 2025	
31	GK	(Cameroon) Simon Ngapandouetnbu	(France) Marseille	Free	7 August 2025	
5	MF	(France) Everson Junior	(France) Ajaccio	Free	15 August 2025	
28	MF	(Belgium) Ayanda Sishuba	(France) Rennes	Loan	1 September 2025	
20	MF	(France) Nabil Homssa	(France) Voltigeurs de Châteaubriant	Free	30 January 2026	
14	FW	(France) Enzo Molebe	(France) Lyon	Loan	2 February 2026	

=== Out ===
Pos.	Player	Transferred to	Fee	Date	Source
DF	(Ivory Coast) Bamo Meïté	(France) Marseille	Loan return	1 July 2025	
MF	(France) Rabby Nzingoula	(France) Strasbourg	Loan return	1 July 2025	
FW	(Algeria) Andy Delort	(Algeria) MC Alger	Loan return	1 July 2025	
GK	(Democratic Republic of the Congo) Dimitry Bertaud	Released	Free	1 July 2025	
DF	(Serbia) Nikola Maksimović	Released	Free	1 July 2025	
DF	(Guinea) Issiaga Sylla	Released (Note: On 15 July 2025, Sylla signed for Asteras Tripolis.)	Free	1 July 2025	
FW	(France) Simon Cara	Released (Note: On 5 August 2025, Cara signed for Istres.)	Free	1 July 2025	
FW	(Tunisia) Wahbi Khazri	Released	Free	1 July 2025	
GK	(Bosnia and Herzegovina) Belmin Dizdarević	(Bosnia and Herzegovina) Velež Mostar	Free	6 July 2025	
FW	(Morocco) Othmane Maamma	(England) Watford	Undisclosed	11 July 2025	
GK	(France) Benjamin Lecomte	(England) Fulham	Undisclosed	26 July 2025	
DF	(Mali) Modibo Sagnan	(Turkey) Çaykur Rizespor	Loan (Note: Includes an option to sign permanently)	2 August 2025	
MF	(France) Jordan Ferri	(Italy) Sampdoria	Free	7 August 2025	
DF	(Mali) Falaye Sacko	(Azerbaijan) Netfçi	Undisclosed	11 August 2025	
MF	(Mali) Birama Touré	(Turkey) Manisa	Undisclosed	12 August 2025	
DF	(Mali) Kiki Kouyaté	(Belgium) Antwerp	Undisclosed	12 August 2025	
MF	(France) Joris Chotard	(France) Brest	€2.4 million (Note: Up to €600,000 in bonuses)	23 August 2025	
MF	(France) Tanguy Coulibaly	(Turkey) Samsunspor	€600,000	2 September 2025	
FW	(Cameroon) Glenn Ngosso	Released	Free	2 October 2025	
FW	(United Arab Emirates) Junior Ndiaye	(France) Quevilly-Rouen	Loan	28 January 2026	
FW	(Nigeria) Victor Orakpo	(France) Nice	Loan return	2 February 2026	
DF	(Switzerland) Bećir Omeragić	(Switzerland) Basel	€2.25 million	16 February 2026	

== Competitions ==
=== Overall record ===
Competition	First match	Last match	Starting round	Final position	Record							
Competition	First match	Last match	Starting round	Final position	Pld	W	D	L	GF	GA	GD	Win %
Ligue 2	8 August 2025	8 May 2026	Matchday 1	8th place	34	14	9	11	41	31	+10	41.18
Coupe de France	16 November 2025	4 February 2026	Third round	Round of 16	5	4	0	1	11	3	+8	80.00
Total					39	18	9	12	52	34	+18	46.15

Last updated: 9 May 2026
Source: Competitions

=== Ligue 2 ===
==== League table ====
Pos	Team	Pld	W	D	L	GF	GA	GD	Pts	Promotion or Relegation
1	Troyes (C, P)	34	20	7	7	60	33	+27	67	Promotion to Ligue 1
2	Le Mans (P)	34	16	14	4	50	31	+19	62	Promotion to Ligue 1
3	Saint-Étienne	34	18	6	10	59	38	+21	60	Qualification for promotion play-off semi-final
4	Red Star	34	16	10	8	45	37	+8	58	Qualification for promotion play-off quarter-final
5	Rodez	34	15	13	6	45	39	+6	58	Qualification for promotion play-off quarter-final
6	Reims	34	14	14	6	53	35	+18	56	
7	Annecy	34	15	7	12	49	39	+10	52	
8	Montpellier	34	14	9	11	41	31	+10	51	
9	Pau	34	12	9	13	48	62	−14	45	
10	Dunkerque	34	11	10	13	53	45	+8	43	
11	Guingamp	34	10	10	14	42	49	−7	40	
12	Grenoble	34	8	15	11	33	39	−6	39	
13	Clermont	34	9	10	15	38	44	−6	37	
14	Nancy	34	9	10	15	35	52	−17	37	
15	Boulogne	34	9	9	16	34	49	−15	36	
16	Laval (O)	34	6	14	14	30	48	−18	32	Qualification for relegation play-off
17	Bastia (R)	34	5	13	16	23	39	−16	28	Relegation to Ligue 3
18	Amiens (R)	34	6	6	22	37	65	−28	24	Relegation to Ligue 3

Source: Ligue 2
Rules for classification: 1) Points; 2) Goal difference; 3) Number of goals scored; 4) Head-to-head goal difference; 5) Fair play points
(C) Champions; (O) Play-off winners; (P) Promoted; (R) Relegated
