= Téji Savanier =

French footballer (born 1991)

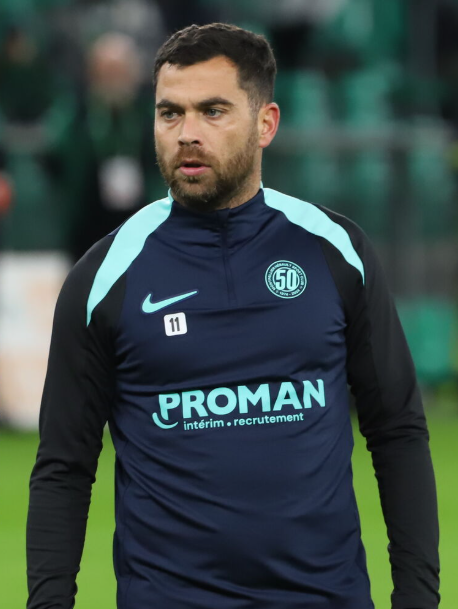
- Savanier with Montpellier in 2024

Personal information
- Full name: Téji Tedy Savanier
- Date of birth: 22 December 1991 (age 34)
- Place of birth: Montpellier, France
- Height: 1.72 m (5 ft 8 in)
- Position: Attacking midfielder

Team information
- Current team: Metz
- Number: 10

Youth career
- 1998–1999: RC Saint-Georges-d'Orques
- 1999–2000: AS Saint-Martin Montpellier
- 2000–2003: Centre Éducatif Palavasien Foot
- 2003–2006: Castelnau Le Crès
- 2006–2010: Montpellier

Senior career*
Years	Team	Apps	(Gls)
2009–2011	Montpellier B	29	(5)
2011–2015	Arles-Avignon	105	(7)
2014–2015	Arles-Avignon B	4	(0)
2015–2019	Nîmes	124	(21)
2019–2026	Montpellier	193	(47)
2026–	Metz	0	(0)

International career
2021	France Olympic	4	(1)
- * Club domestic league appearances and goals as of 11 May 2026

Téji Tedy Savanier (born 22 December 1991) is a French professional footballer who plays as an attacking midfielder for Ligue 2 club Metz.

Formed at Montpellier, where he only made the reserve team in his first spell, he began his professional career at Arles-Avignon in Ligue 2. In 2015 he joined Nîmes, where he won promotion and played in Ligue 1 in the 2018–19 season. Savanier then returned to Montpellier for a club-record fee of €10 million, later becoming the team's captain.

Savanier represented the France Olympic team at the 2020 games.

== Club career ==
=== Early career ===
Formed at his hometown club Montpellier, Savanier had only played for the reserve team when in 2011 he joined Arles-Avignon of Ligue 2. His first professional goal was his only of that season, opening a 3–0 home win over Lens on 24 September.

=== Nîmes ===
In August 2015, Savanier moved to fellow Ligue 2 club Nîmes on a one-year deal with a clause allowing a second season. Two years later, he extended his link until 2020. In 2017–18, he helped the Crocodiles to second place and promotion to Ligue 1 for the first time since 1993. He and teammates Umut Bozok and Rachid Alioui made the league's Team of the Year at the Trophées UNFP du football.

In 2018–19, his debut top-flight season, Savanier helped Nîmes come 9th. He led the league in assists with 14, ahead of Ángel Di María and Nicolas Pépé on 11 each, and surpassed only by Eden Hazard (15) in Europe's five largest leagues. Near the start of the season he was involved in a controversy in a 4–2 home loss to Paris Saint-Germain in which he was sent off for a foul on Kylian Mbappé, who was also given a red card for pushing him in retaliation.

=== Montpellier ===
In July 2019, Savanier returned to Montpellier for an estimated €10 million fee, a club record. He became a key part of the team under manager Michel Der Zakarian.

After the retirement of 43-year-old club veteran Vitorino Hilton, Savanier succeeded him as captain of Montpellier in 2021. In December that year, he was UNFP Player of the Month for his two goals and two assists.

In June 2022, with one year remaining of his contract, Savanier extended it to 2026. He had been of interest to Nice and Lyon. The 2022–23 season was his most prolific with 12 goals, starting with two on the opening day in a 3–2 home win over Troyes. He was sent off three times over the campaign; the third, in a 1–0 home win against Rennes on 23 April, earned him a three-match ban.

== International career ==
Savanier was named as one of three overage players for the French Olympic team for the 2020 tournament in Japan. In the second group game, he scored the added-time winner in a 4–3 victory over South Africa.

In March 2021, Savanier gave an interview to France Bleu in which he said he could equally play for Algeria – where his grandfather was born – as for France. He later clarified that his only wish was to play for France.

== Personal life ==
Born in Montpellier to a Romani family, Savanier lives near his family in Figuerolles, a district of the city. When he played for Arles, one hour away, he rented with his mother.

== Career statistics ==
As of match played 9 May 2026

Appearances and goals by club, season, and competition
Club	Season	League			Coupe de France		Coupe de la Ligue		Total	
Club	Season	Division	Apps	Goals	Apps	Goals	Apps	Goals	Apps	Goals
Montpellier B	2008–09	CFA	3	1	—		—		3	1
Montpellier B	2009–10	CFA	14	2	—		—		14	2
Montpellier B	2010–11	CFA 2	12	2	—		—		12	2
Montpellier B	Total		29	5	—		—		29	5
Arles-Avignon	2011–12	Ligue 2	21	1	0	0	1	0	22	1
Arles-Avignon	2012–13	Ligue 2	27	2	2	1	3	0	32	3
Arles-Avignon	2013–14	Ligue 2	25	1	1	0	1	0	27	1
Arles-Avignon	2014–15	Ligue 2	32	3	1	0	4	1	37	4
Arles-Avignon	Total		105	7	4	1	9	1	118	9
Arles-Avignon B	2013–14	CFA 2	2	0	—		—		2	0
Arles-Avignon B	2014–15	CFA 2	2	0	—		—		2	0
Arles-Avignon B	Total		4	0	—		—		4	0
Nîmes	2015–16	Ligue 2	27	3	1	0	0	0	28	3
Nîmes	2016–17	Ligue 2	34	8	0	0	1	0	35	8
Nîmes	2017–18	Ligue 2	31	4	3	0	1	1	35	5
Nîmes	2018–19	Ligue 1	32	6	1	0	1	0	37	6
Nîmes	Total		124	21	5	0	3	1	132	22
Montpellier	2019–20	Ligue 1	19	6	2	1	2	0	23	7
Montpellier	2020–21	Ligue 1	27	5	4	0	—		31	5
Montpellier	2021–22	Ligue 1	29	8	2	1	—		31	9
Montpellier	2022–23	Ligue 1	30	12	0	0	—		30	12
Montpellier	2023–24	Ligue 1	32	9	2	0	—		34	9
Montpellier	2024–25	Ligue 1	31	2	1	0	—		32	2
Montpellier	2025–26	Ligue 2	25	5	3	1	—		28	6
Montpellier	Total		193	47	14	3	2	0	209	50
Career total			455	80	23	4	14	2	492	86

== Honours ==
Individual

- UNFP Player of the Month: December 2021
- The Athletic Ligue 1 Team of the Season: 2023–24
