= 2024–25 Montpellier HSC season =

Montpellier HSC
2024–25 season
- President: Laurent Nicollin
- Manager: Michel Der Zakarian (until 20 October); Jean-Louis Gasset (22 October–7 April); Zoumana Camara (from 8 April)
- Stadium: Stade de la Mosson
- Ligue 1: 18th (relegated)
- Coupe de France: Round of 64
- Top goalscorer: League: Arnaud Nordin (4); All: Arnaud Nordin (4)
- Highest home attendance: 18,461 vs Marseille
- Average home league attendance: 13,544
Home colours
- All statistics correct as of 26 April 2025.

The 2024–25 season was the 106th season in the history of Montpellier HSC, and its 16th consecutive season in Ligue 1. The club finished 18th and was relegated to Ligue 2. In addition to the domestic league, the team participated in the Coupe de France, getting knocked out in the round of 64.

== Players ==
=== Squad ===
As of 3 February 2025

Note: Flags indicate national team as defined under FIFA eligibility rules; some limited exceptions apply. Players may hold more than one non-FIFA nationality.

No.	Pos.	Nation	Player
1	GK	BIH	Belmin Dizdarević
2	DF	CIV	Bamo Meïté (on loan from Marseille)
3	DF	GUI	Issiaga Sylla
4	DF	MLI	Boubakar Kouyaté
5	DF	MLI	Modibo Sagnan
6	DF	FRA	Christopher Jullien
9	FW	ALG	Andy Delort (on loan from MC Alger)
10	FW	TUN	Wahbi Khazri
11	MF	FRA	Téji Savanier
12	MF	FRA	Jordan Ferri
13	MF	FRA	Joris Chotard
14	FW	MAR	Othmane Maamma
16	GK	COD	Dimitry Bertaud

No.	Pos.	Nation	Player
17	DF	FRA	Théo Sainte-Luce
18	MF	FRA	Nicolas Pays
19	MF	FRA	Rabby Nzingoula (on loan from Strasbourg)
21	DF	FRA	Lucas Mincarelli
22	MF	MAR	Khalil Fayad
27	DF	SUI	Bećir Omeragić
28	FW	CMR	Glenn Ngosso
29	DF	CMR	Enzo Tchato
40	GK	FRA	Benjamin Lecomte (captain)
52	DF	SRB	Nikola Maksimović
70	FW	FRA	Tanguy Coulibaly
77	DF	MLI	Falaye Sacko

=== Out on loan ===
Note: Flags indicate national team as defined under FIFA eligibility rules; some limited exceptions apply. Players may hold more than one non-FIFA nationality.

No.	Pos.	Nation	Player
—	MF	MLI	Birama Touré (at Manisa until 30 June 2025)

== Transfers ==
=== In ===
No.	Pos.	Player	Transferred from	Fee	Date	Source
19	MF	(France) Rabby Nzingoula	(France) Strasbourg	Loan	28 August 2024	
20	MF	(Mali) Birama Touré	Unattached	Free	11 September 2024	
52	DF	(Serbia) Nikola Maksimović	Unattached	Free	31 October 2024	
9	FW	(Algeria) Andy Delort	(Algeria) MC Alger	Loan (Note: Includes an option to sign permanently)	29 January 2025	
18	MF	(France) Nicolas Pays	(France) Le Puy	Free	29 January 2025	
2	DF	(Ivory Coast) Bamo Meïté	(France) Marseille	Loan	3 February 2025	

=== Out ===
Pos.	Player	Transferred to	Fee	Date	Source
DF	(France) Maxime Estève	(England) Burnley	€12 million	10 June 2024	
MF	(France) Léo Leroy	(Switzerland) Basel	€500,000 (Note: Transfer fee between €500,000 and €1 million, according to L'Équipe.)	21 June 2024	
DF	(Switzerland) Silvan Hefti	(Italy) Genoa	Loan return	1 July 2024	
MF	(France) Yann Karamoh	(Italy) Torino	Loan return	1 July 2024	
MF	(France) Sacha Delaye	Austria Lustanau	Free	18 July 2024	
FW	(Nigeria) Akor Adams	(Spain) Sevilla	€7 million	27 January 2025	
FW	(France) Arnaud Nordin	(Germany) Mainz 05	€1 million	28 January 2025	
MF	(Switzerland) Gabriel Barès	(Spain) Burgos	Free	3 February 2025	
FW	(Jordan) Mousa Al-Tamari	(France) Rennes	€8 million	3 February 2025	
MF	(Mali) Birama Touré	(Turkey) Manisa	Loan	7 February 2025	

== Friendlies ==
=== Pre-season ===
20 July 2024 Friendly	Montpellier	3–3	Girona	Les Preses
11:00 CEST (UTC+2)	Nordin 19'; Khazri 71' (pen.), 85'		Dovbyk 24', 38'; Vallejo 81'	Stadium: Instalaciones de Royalverd; Attendance: 0

27 July 2024 Friendly	Southampton	3–1	Montpellier	Spain
11:00

31 July 2024 Friendly	Montpellier	1–2	Saint-Étienne
18:00

4 August 2024 Friendly	Fiorentina	2–1	Montpellier	Bagno a Ripoli, Italy
15:30				Stadium: Stadio Curva Fiesole - Viola Park

7 August 2024 Friendly	Montpellier	2–0	Cannes
18:00

10 August 2024 Friendly	Mainz 05	3–1	Montpellier	Mainz, Germany
15:30				Stadium: MEWA ARENA

== Competitions ==
=== Overall record ===
Competition	First match	Last match	Starting round	Final position	Record							
Competition	First match	Last match	Starting round	Final position	Pld	W	D	L	GF	GA	GD	Win %
Ligue 1	18 August 2024	18 May 2025	Matchday 1		33	4	4	25	23	76	−53	12.12
Coupe de France	21 December 2024	21 December 2024	Round of 64	Round of 64	1	0	0	1	0	4	−4	0.00
Total					34	4	4	26	23	80	−57	11.76

Last updated: 11 May 2025
Source: Soccerway

=== Ligue 1 ===
==== League table ====
Pos	Team	Pld	W	D	L	GF	GA	GD	Pts	Qualification or relegation
14	Angers	34	10	6	18	32	53	−21	36	
15	Le Havre	34	10	4	20	40	71	−31	34	
16	Reims (R)	34	8	9	17	33	47	−14	33	Qualification for the relegation play-offs
17	Saint-Étienne (R)	34	8	6	20	39	77	−38	30	Relegation to Ligue 2
18	Montpellier (R)	34	4	4	26	23	79	−56	16	Relegation to Ligue 2

Source: Ligue 1
Rules for classification: 1) Points; 2) Goal difference; 3) Head-to-head points; 4) Head-to-head goal difference; 5) Head-to-head goals scored; 6) Head-to-head away goals scored; 7) Goals scored; 8) Away goals scored; 9) Fair-play points (Note: Head-to-head record is used only after all the matches between the teams in question have been played).
(R) Relegated

==== Results summary ====
Overall								Home						Away					
Pld	W	D	L	GF	GA	GD	Pts	W	D	L	GF	GA	GD	W	D	L	GF	GA	GD
33	4	4	25	23	76	−53	16	3	4	10	17	41	−24	1	0	15	6	35	−29

Last updated: 11 May 2025.
Source: Ligue 1

==== Results by round ====
Round	1	2	3	4	5	6	7	8	9	10	11	12	13	14	15	16	17	18	19	20	21	22	23	24	25	26	27	28	29	30	31	32	33	34
Ground	H	A	H	A	H	A	A	H	H	A	H	A	H	A	H	A	H	H	A	H	A	H	A	H	A	H	A	H	A	A	H	A	H	A
Result	D	L	L	L	W	L	L	L	L	L	W	L	D	L	D	L	L	W	W	L	L	L	L	L	L	L	L	L	L	L	D	L	L	
Position	8	14	16	18	15	16	17	18	18	18	18	18	18	18	18	18	18	18	17	17	18	18	18	18	18	18	18	18	18	18	18	18	18	18

Updated to match(es) played on 11 May 2025. Source: Ligue 1
A = Away; H = Home; W = Win; D = Draw; L = Loss

==== Matches ====
The league schedule was released on 21 June 2024.

18 August 2024 1	Montpellier	1–1	Strasbourg	Montpellier
17:00 CEST (UTC+2)	Ferri (yellow card) 21'; Sagnan (yellow card) 52'; Savanier 67' (pen.); Nordin (yellow card) 78'; Al-Taamari (yellow card) 90+2'	Report	Sylla (yellow card) 27'; Diarra 58'; Doukouré (yellow card) 82'; Fila (yellow card) 90+8'	Stadium: Stade de la Mosson; Attendance: 15,706; Referee: Mathieu Vernice

23 August 2024 2	Paris Saint-Germain	6–0	Montpellier	Paris
20:45 CEST (UTC+2)	Barcola 4', 53'; Asensio 24'; Dembélé (yellow card) 55'; Hakimi 58'; Zaïre-Emery 60'; Lee 82'	Report	Sacko (yellow card) 33'; Chotard (yellow card) 45+1'; Kouyaté (yellow card) 50'; Khazri (yellow card) 57'	Stadium: Parc des Princes; Attendance: 46,000; Referee: Marc Bollengier

31 August 2024 3	Montpellier	1–3	Nantes	Montpellier
19:00 CEST (UTC+2)	Adams 30'; Nzingoula (yellow card) 85'; Ferri (yellow card) 90+3'	Report	Abline 24'; Simon 45+7' (pen.); Coco (yellow card) 81'; Lafont (yellow card) 85'; Mohamed 85'	Stadium: Stade de la Mosson; Attendance: 13,000; Referee: Benoît Millot

15 September 2024 4	Rennes	3–0	Montpellier	Rennes
15:00 CET (UTC+1)	Seidu (yellow card) 8'; Blas 24'; Kalimuendo 35'; Grønbæk 60'	Report	Sagnan (yellow card) 22'; Nzingoula (yellow card) 79'; Džodić (yellow card) 85'	Stadium: Roazhon Park; Attendance: 27,451; Referee: Jérémie Pignard

22 September 2024 5	Montpellier	3–2	Auxerre	Montpellier
17:00 CEST (UTC+2)	Nzingoula (yellow card) 33'; Adams 65', 75', (yellow card) 76'; Omeragić (yellow card) 65'; Sagnan 71'	Report	Traorè 18'; Owusu (yellow card) 48'; Sinayoko (yellow card) 57'; Diomandé (yellow card) 61'; Perrin (yellow card) 66'; Onaiwu 72'	Stadium: Stade de la Mosson; Attendance: 11,643; Referee: Hakim Ben El Hadj

28 September 2024 6	Monaco	2–1	Montpellier	Monaco
21:00 CEST (UTC+2)	Balogun 32'; Vanderson (yellow card) 50'; Zakaria (yellow card) 50'; Salisu (yellow card) 82'; Camara (yellow card) 88', (goal) 90+8'	Report	Sagnan (yellow card) 4'; Coulibaly (yellow card) 12' (yellow-red card) 90+2'; Nzingoula 16'	Stadium: Stade Louis II; Attendance: 13,065; Referee: Marc Bollengier

6 October 2024 7	Reims	4–2	Montpellier	Reims
17:00 CEST (UTC+2)	Munetsi 6'; Nakamura 25'; Diakité 57', (yellow card) 58'; Fofana (yellow card) 59'; Teuma (yellow card) 73', (goal) 90+3' (pen.)	Report	Touré (yellow card) 27'; Nordin 37', 90+1'; Adams (yellow card) 37'; Džodić (yellow card) 49'; Savanier (yellow card) 64'; Chotard (yellow card) 89'	Stadium: Stade Auguste-Delaune; Attendance: 14,903; Referee: Benoît Bastien

20 October 2024 8	Montpellier	0–5	Marseille	Montpellier
20:45 CEST (UTC+2)	Nzingoula (yellow card) 27'; Džodić (red card) 64'	Report	Wahi 1'; Cornelius (yellow card) 19'; Harit 36'; Højbjerg 40'; Rowe (yellow card) 51'; Greenwood 58'; Henrique 73'; Sternal (yellow card) 90'	Stadium: Stade de la Mosson; Attendance: 18,461; Referee: Clément Turpin

27 October 2024 9	Montpellier	0–3	Toulouse	Montpellier
17:00 UTC+1	Nordin (yellow card) 45+2'; Savanier (red card) 51'	Report	Aboukhlal 5', 8'; King 27'; Cásseres (yellow card) 59'; McKenzie (yellow card) 66'	Stadium: Stade de la Mosson; Attendance: 14,111; Referee: Thomas Léonard

3 November 2024 10	Le Havre	1–0	Montpellier	Le Havre
17:00 CET (UTC+1)	Lloris (yellow card) 31'; Salmier (yellow card) 46'; Touré 73' (pen.)	Report	Ferri (yellow card) 35'	Stadium: Stade Océane; Attendance: 18,703; Referee: Stéphanie Frappart

10 November 2024 11	Montpellier	3–1	Brest	Montpellier
17:00 CET (UTC+1)	Nordin 6' (pen.), (penalty missed) 60'; Khazri 12', (yellow card) 16'; Ferri (yellow card) 56'; Sagnan (yellow card) 60'; Touré (yellow card) 69'; Coulibaly 84'; Chennahi (yellow card) 90+2'	Report	Martin (yellow card) 26', (goal) 50'	Stadium: Stade de la Mosson; Attendance: 12,936; Referee: Jérémie Pignard

23 November 2024 12	Saint-Étienne	1–0	Montpellier	Saint-Étienne
19:00 CET (UTC+1)	Bouchouari 47', (yellow card) 64'; Davitashvili (yellow card) 57'; Boakye (yellow card) 62'	Report	Chotard (yellow card) 28'; Nzingoula (yellow card) 34'; Tchato (yellow card) 41'; Al-Taamari (yellow card) 56'; Sylla (yellow card) 56'	Stadium: Stade Geoffroy-Guichard; Attendance: 33,008; Referee: Florent Batta

1 December 2024 13	Montpellier	2–2	Lille	Montpellier
15:00 CET (UTC+1)	Maksimović (yellow card) 9'; Tchato (yellow card) 35'; Sylla 45+2'; Savanier (yellow card) 52'; Sagnan (yellow card) 83'; Nordin 90+3'; Coulibaly (red card) 90+9'	Report	Mukau (yellow card) 26'; David 44' (pen.), 54' (pen.); Alexsandro (yellow card) 47'; Cabella (yellow card) 52'; Fernandez-Pardo (yellow card) 89'; Bakker (red card) 90+9'; Haraldsson (yellow card) 90+13'	Stadium: Stade de la Mosson; Attendance: 13,691; Referee: Benoît Millot

8 December 2024 14	Lens	2–0	Montpellier	Lens
15:00 CET (UTC+1)	Labeau 39'; Sotoca (yellow card) 79'; Samba (yellow card) 90'; Lecomte 90+1' (o.g.)	Report	Savanier (yellow card) 43'; Sagnan (yellow card) 71'; Tchato (yellow card) 90+4'	Stadium: Stade Bollaert-Delelis; Referee: Mathieu Vernice

15 December 2024 15	Montpellier	2–2	Nice	Montpellier
15:00 CET (UTC+1)	Chotard 22'; Sainte-Luce 80'; Nzingoula (yellow card) 90+4'	Report	Laborde 17'; Bouanani 28', (yellow card) 34'; Clauss (yellow card) 53'	Stadium: Stade de la Mosson; Attendance: 11,612; Referee: Clement Turpin

4 January 2025 16	Lyon	1–0	Montpellier	Décines-Charpieu
21:00 CET (UTC+1)	Veretout (yellow card) 66'; Fayad 90+1' (o.g.)	Report	Sagnan (yellow card) 50'; Maksimović (yellow card) 64'	Stadium: Parc Olympique Lyonnais; Attendance: 48,162; Referee: Jérémy Stinat

12 January 2025 17	Montpellier	1–3	Angers	Montpellier
17:15 CET (UTC+1)	Nzingoula (yellow card) 39'; Al-Taamari (yellow card) 45+1'; Sylla (yellow card) 53'; Savanier 61' (pen.); Kouyaté (yellow card) 73' (yellow-red card) 84'; Fayad (yellow card) 83'; Ferri (red card) 85'	Report	Lepaul 30', 69'; Aholou (yellow card) 47'; Belkebla (yellow card) 90+4'; Ferhat 90+9'	Stadium: Stade de la Mosson; Attendance: 11,719; Referee: Romain Lissorgue

17 January 2025 18	Montpellier	2–1	Monaco	Montpellier
19:00 CET (UTC+1)	Al-Taamari 55', 82'; Mouanga (yellow card) 81'	Report	Kehrer 32'; Magassa (yellow card) 56'; Vanderson (yellow card) 67'	Stadium: Stade de la Mosson; Attendance: 11,371; Referee: Jérôme Brisard

26 January 2025 19	Toulouse	1–2	Montpellier	Toulouse
17:15 CET (UTC+1)	Canvot (yellow card) 47'; Cásseres Jr. 59'	Report	Nzingoula (yellow card) 17'; Chotard (yellow card) 41'; Sagnan 62'; Maamma 83'	Stadium: Stadium de Toulouse; Attendance: 28,382; Referee: Clément Turpin

31 January 2025 20	Montpellier	0–2	Lens	Montpellier
20:45 CET (UTC+1)	Sainte-Luce (yellow card) 18'; Kouyaté (yellow card) 50'; Sagnan (yellow card) 78'; Chotard (yellow card) 90+1'	Report	Nzola 1'; Machado (yellow card) 45+6'; Medina (yellow card) 45+7'; Agbonifo 61'; Ojediran (yellow card) 90+6'	Stadium: Stade de la Mosson; Attendance: 15,330; Referee: Bastien Dechepy

9 February 2025 21	Strasbourg	2–0	Montpellier	Strasbourg
17:15 CET (UTC+1)	Emegha 45+2'; Nanasi 69'; Santos (yellow card) 77'	Report	Sagnan (yellow card) 19'; Meïté (yellow card) 73'; Khazri (yellow card) 80'; Maamma (yellow card) 87'	Stadium: Stade de la Meinau; Attendance: 19,042; Referee: Jérémy Stinat

16 February 2025 22	Montpellier	1–4	Lyon	Montpellier
15:00 CET (UTC+1)	Coulibaly (yellow card) 29', (goal) 38'; Delort (yellow card) 34'; Sainte-Luce (yellow card) 86'	Report	Mikautadze 3'; Nuamah 50'; Tolisso 53'; Tagliafico (yellow card) 64'; Lacazette 73'	Stadium: Stade de la Mosson; Attendance: 16,573; Referee: Marc Bollengier

23 February 2025 23	Nice	2–0	Montpellier	Nice
17:15 CET (UTC+1)	Clauss 30'; Boudaoui 65'; Ndayishimiye (yellow card) 71'	Report	Fayad (yellow card) 50'	Stadium: Allianz Riviera; Attendance: 18,519; Referee: Willy Delajod

2 March 2025 24	Montpellier	0–4	Rennes	Montpellier
17:15 CET (UTC+1)	Ferri (yellow card) 18'; Kouyaté (yellow card) 40'	Report	Fofana 28', (yellow card) 35'; Cissé 56'; Assignon 69'; Kalimuendo (penalty missed) 87', 87'	Stadium: Stade de la Mosson; Attendance: 11,990; Referee: Florent Batta

8 March 2025 25	Lille	1–0	Montpellier	Villeneuve-d'Ascq
19:00 CET (UTC+1)	Alexsandro (yellow card) 9'; David 50'; Diakité (yellow card) 84'	Report	Nzingoula (yellow card) 36'; Sainte-Luce (yellow card) 71'; Kouyaté (yellow card) 78'	Stadium: Stade Pierre-Mauroy; Attendance: 42,467; Referee: Jérémie Pignard

16 March 2025 26	Montpellier	0–2; Awarded	Saint-Étienne	Montpellier
18:15 CEST (UTC+2)	Savanier (yellow card) 15'	Report	Davitashvili (yellow card) 7'; Bernauer (yellow card) 9' (yellow-red card) 45'; Stassin 11', 53'	Stadium: Stade de la Mosson; Attendance: 14,358; Referee: François Letexier
Note: The game was abandoned in the 62nd minute following a 20-minute suspension after home fans threw flares on to the pitch and part of a stand caught fire. Three weeks later, the Professional Football League validated the victory achieved in Montpellier by AS Saint-Etienne.

30 March 2025 27	Auxerre	1–0	Montpellier	Auxerre
17:15 CET (UTC+1)	Owusu (yellow card) 18'; Akpa (yellow card) 35'; Massengo (yellow card) 78'; Ayé 82'	Report	Meïté (yellow card) 47'	Stadium: Stade de l'Abbé-Deschamps; Attendance: 16,558; Referee: Marc Bollengier

6 April 2025 28	Montpellier	0–2	Le Havre	Montpellier
17:15 CET (UTC+1)	Khazri (yellow card) 90+1'; Meïté (red card) 90+6'	Report	Kechta 3'; Touré 33'; Gorgelin (yellow card) 90+1'	Stadium: Stade de la Mosson; Attendance: 10,146; Referee: Benoît Bastien

13 April 2025 29	Angers	2–0	Montpellier	Angers
17:15	Lepaul 2', 43'	Report	Fayad (yellow card) 37'; Sagnan (yellow card) 45'	Stadium: Stade Raymond Kopa; Attendance: 12,514; Referee: Benoît Millot

19 April 2025 30	Marseille	5–1	Montpellier	Marseille
21:05 CEST (UTC+2)	Greenwood 8' (pen.), 67'; Rongier (yellow card) 15'; Bille 60' (o.g.); Rowe 74'; Rabiot (yellow card) 77', (goal) 90'	Report	Nzingoula (yellow card) 46'; Mincarelli 83'; Mouanga (yellow card) 90+3'	Stadium: Stade Vélodrome; Attendance: 66,312; Referee: Jérôme Brisard

27 April 2025 31	Montpellier	0–0	Reims	Montpellier
17:15 CET (UTC+1)	Fayad (yellow card) 37'; Mouanga (yellow card) 41'; Coulibaly (yellow card) 90'	Report	Kipré (yellow card) 45+1'; Akieme (yellow card) 68'; Nakamura (yellow card) 90+3'	Stadium: Stade de la Mosson; Attendance: 10,806; Referee: Jérémie Pignard

4 May 2025 32	Brest	1–0	Montpellier	Brest
17:15 CEST (UTC+2)	Del Castillo 15'; Lees-Melou (yellow card) 73'	Report	Nzingoula (yellow card) 13'; Fayad (yellow card) 89'	Stadium: Stade Francis-Le Blé; Attendance: 13,121; Referee: Romain Lissorgue

10 May 2025 33	Montpellier	1–4	Paris Saint-Germain	Montpellier
21:00 CEST (UTC+2)	Ferri (yellow card) 42'; Coulibaly 64'	Report	Beraldo (yellow card) 39'; Mayulu 44'; Ramos 49', 59' (pen.), 65'	Stadium: Stade de la Mosson; Attendance: 16,787; Referee: Mathieu Vernice

17 May 2025 34	Nantes	3–0	Montpellier	Nantes
21:00 CEST (UTC+2)		Report		Stadium: Stade de la Beaujoire

=== Coupe de France ===
21 December 2024 Round of 64	Le Puy	4–0	Montpellier	Le Puy-en-Velay
18:00 CET (UTC+1)	Zogba 43'; Pays 75'; Diebold (yellow card) 30', (goal) 78'; Mayela 90'	Report	Chotard (yellow card) 53'; Fayad (yellow card) 70'	Stadium: Stade Charles Massot; Referee: Jérémie Pignard
