= Junior Ndiaye =

Emirati footballer (born 2005)

Personal information
- Full name: Junior Salif Ndiaye Billong
- Date of birth: 29 March 2005 (age 21)
- Place of birth: Dubai, United Arab Emirates
- Height: 1.80 m (5 ft 11 in)
- Position: Forward

Team information
- Current team: Valenciennes (on loan from Montpellier)
- Number: 9

Youth career
- 2012–2019: AS Lattoise
- 2019–2024: Montpellier

Senior career*
Years	Team	Apps	(Gls)
2022–2025	Montpellier B	53	(21)
2024–	Montpellier	19	(1)
2026	→ Quevilly-Rouen (loan)	13	(4)
2026–	→ Valenciennes (loan)	6	(3)

International career^{‡}
2022	France U17	6	(2)
2025–	United Arab Emirates U23	13	(6)
Medal record
Men's football
Representing France
UEFA European Under-17 Championship
Winner	2022 Israel
- * Club domestic league appearances and goals as of 5 November 2026 ‡ National team caps and goals as of 23 September 2026

Junior Salif Ndiaye Billong (Arabic: جونيور ساليف سامبا ندياي بيلونغ; born 29 March 2005) is an Emirati professional footballer who plays as a forward for Ligue 3 club Valenciennes, on loan from Ligue 2 club Montpellier. He has also represented France at youth international level.

== Club career ==
Ndiaye started his youth career with AS Lattoise. He joined the youth academy of Montpellier in 2019. In May 2023, he was elected as the club's best male academy player of the season. He made his professional debut for Montpellier on 7 February 2024 in a 4–1 Coupe de France defeat to Nice.

On 21 May 2025, Ndiaye signed his first professional contract with Montpellier. He scored his first goal for the club on 18 August 2025 in a 2–1 league win against Le Mans.

On 28 January 2026, Ndiaye joined Quevilly-Rouen on loan until the end of the season. On 2 September 2026, he joined Valenciennes on a season-long loan deal.

== International career ==
In international football, Ndiaye was eligible to represent France by nationality, the United Arab Emirates by birth, Senegal through his father, and Cameroon through his mother.

Ndiaye has represented France at youth level. In April 2022, he was named in the squad for the 2022 UEFA European Under-17 Championship. He played one match in the tournament as France defeated Netherlands in the final to win their third UEFA European Under-17 Championship.

In August 2024, Ndiaye received his first call-up to the United Arab Emirates national team for FIFA World Cup qualification matches against Qatar and Iran. In March 2025, he was named in the squad for the 2025 WAFF U-23 Championship. In January 2026, he was included in the squad for the 2026 AFC U-23 Asian Cup. In September 2026, he was named in the squad for the 2026 Asian Games.

== Personal life ==
Ndiaye is the son of Senegalese-born former footballer Samba N'Diaye, who represented France at under-21 level. Born in Dubai, Junior Ndiaye moved to France at the age of seven after his father settled there following the end of his playing career.

== Career statistics ==
As of match played 5 November 2026

Appearances and goals by club, season and competition
Club	Season	League			Cup (Note: Includes Coupe de France)		Total	
Club	Season	Division	Apps	Goals	Apps	Goals	Apps	Goals
Montpellier B	2021–22	Championnat National 2	2	0	—		2	0
Montpellier B	2022–23	Championnat National 3	22	4	—		22	4
Montpellier B	2023–24	Championnat National 3	17	6	—		17	6
Montpellier B	2024–25	Championnat National 3	6	5	—		6	5
Montpellier B	2025–26	Championnat National 3	6	6	—		6	6
Montpellier B	Total		53	21	0	0	53	21
Montpellier	2023–24	Ligue 1	0	0	1	0	1	0
Montpellier	2024–25	Ligue 1	15	0	1	0	16	0
Montpellier	2025–26	Ligue 2	4	1	2	0	6	1
Montpellier	2026–27	Ligue 2	0	0	0	0	0	0
Montpellier	Total		19	1	4	0	23	1
Quevilly-Rouen (loan)	2025–26	Championnat National	13	4	—		13	4
Valenciennes (loan)	2026–27	Ligue 3	6	3	0	0	6	3
Career total			91	29	4	0	95	29

== Honours ==
France U17

- UEFA European Under-17 Championship: 2022
