= 2023–24 Montpellier HSC season =

Montpellier HSC
2023–24 season
- President: Laurent Nicollin
- Head coach: Michel Der Zakarian
- Stadium: Stade de la Mosson
- Ligue 1: 12th
- Coupe de France: Round of 16
- Top goalscorer: League: Téji Savanier (9); All: Téji Savanier (9)
- Average home league attendance: 13,901
| Home colours | Away colours | Third colours |

The 2023–24 season was Montpellier Hérault Sport Club's 105th season in existence and 15th consecutive season in Ligue 1. They also competed in the Coupe de France.

== Players ==
=== First-team squad ===
As of 1 February 2024

Note: Flags indicate national team as defined under FIFA eligibility rules; some limited exceptions apply. Players may hold more than one non-FIFA nationality.

| No. | Pos. | Nation | Player |
|---|---|---|---|
| 1 | GK | BIH | Belmin Dizdarević |
| 3 | DF | GUI | Issiaga Sylla |
| 4 | DF | MLI | Boubakar Kouyaté |
| 5 | DF | MLI | Modibo Sagnan |
| 6 | DF | FRA | Christopher Jullien |
| 7 | FW | FRA | Arnaud Nordin |
| 8 | FW | NGR | Akor Adams |
| 9 | FW | JOR | Mousa Al-Tamari |
| 10 | FW | TUN | Wahbi Khazri |
| 11 | MF | FRA | Téji Savanier (captain) |
| 12 | MF | FRA | Jordan Ferri (vice-captain) |
| 13 | MF | FRA | Joris Chotard |
| 16 | GK | COD | Dimitry Bertaud |

| No. | Pos. | Nation | Player |
|---|---|---|---|
| 17 | DF | FRA | Théo Sainte-Luce |
| 18 | MF | FRA | Léo Leroy |
| 19 | MF | FRA | Sacha Delaye |
| 22 | MF | FRA | Khalil Fayad |
| 23 | FW | FRA | Yann Karamoh (on loan from Torino) |
| 27 | DF | SUI | Bećir Omeragić |
| 29 | DF | CMR | Enzo Tchato |
| 35 | DF | FRA | Lucas Mincarelli Davin |
| 36 | DF | SUI | Silvan Hefti (on loan from Genoa) |
| 39 | FW | FRA | Yanis Issoufou |
| 40 | GK | FRA | Benjamin Lecomte |
| 70 | FW | FRA | Tanguy Coulibaly |
| 77 | DF | MLI | Falaye Sacko |

=== Out on loan ===
Note: Flags indicate national team as defined under FIFA eligibility rules; some limited exceptions apply. Players may hold more than one non-FIFA nationality.

| No. / Pos. / Nation / Player; — / DF / FRA / Maxime Estève (at Burnley until 30 June 2024) | No. / Pos. / Nation / Player; — / MF / SUI / Gabriel Barès (at Concarneau until 30 June 2024) |

== Transfers ==
=== In ===
| Pos. | Player | Transferred from | Fee | Date | Source |
|---|---|---|---|---|---|
| DF | (Switzerland) Bećir Omeragić | (Switzerland) Zürich | Free | 1 July 2023 | |
| MF | (Jordan) Musa Al-Taamari | (Belgium) OH Leuven | Free | 1 July 2023 | |
| DF | (Mali) Falaye Sacko | (Portugal) Vitória de Guimarães | €1,300,000 | 1 July 2023 | |
| GK | (Bosnia and Herzegovina) Belmin Dizdarević | (Bosnia and Herzegovina) Sarajevo | Undisclosed | 7 July 2023 | |
| FW | (Nigeria) Akor Adams | (Norway) Lillestrøm | €4,500,000 | 7 August 2023 | |
| DF | (Mali) Modibo Sagnan | (Netherlands) FC Utrecht | €3,200,000 | 1 February 2024 | |
| FW | (Ivory Coast) Yann Karamoh | (Italy) Torino | Loan | 1 February 2024 | |

=== Out ===
| Pos. | Player | Transferred to | Fee | Date | Source |
|---|---|---|---|---|---|
| GK | (Senegal) Bingourou Kamara | Released | | 1 July 2023 | |
| FW | (France) Valère Germain | Released | | 1 July 2023 | |
| FW | (Republic of the Congo) Béni Makouana | (Ukraine) Polissya Zhytomyr | €250,000 | 9 July 2023 | |
| FW | (England) Stephy Mavididi | (England) Leicester City | €7,500,000 | 31 July 2023 | |

Notes
1.Exercised buy option.

== Pre-season and friendlies ==
Win Draw Loss

| 15 July 2023 Friendly | Montpellier | 3–1 | Toulouse | Béziers |
| 19:00 CEST (UTC+2) | Issoufou 45+2'; Khazri 63'; Delaye 83' | | Onaiwu 17' | Stadium: Stade Raoul-Barrière |

| 22 July 2023 Friendly | Nice | 1–0 | Montpellier | Palamos, Spain |
| 10:30 CEST (UTC+2) |

| 29 July 2023 Friendly | Montpellier | v | Saint-Étienne | Montpellier |
| 16:00 CEST (UTC+2) | | | | Stadium: Complexe Sportif de Grammont |
Note: The match was cancelled.

| 2 August 2023 Friendly | Montpellier | 2–1 | Olympique d'Alès en Cévennes | Montpellier |
| 10:00 CEST (UTC+2) | Delaye 3'; Kouyaté 40' | | Mahamat 21' (pen.) | Stadium: Complexe Sportif de Grammont |

| 5 August 2023 Friendly | Borussia Mönchengladbach | 2–2 | Montpellier | Mönchengladbach, Germany |
| 15:30 CEST (UTC+2) | Ranos 30'; Weigl 35'; Netz (yellow card) | Report | Savanier 42'; Al-Taamari 45', (yellow card); Kouyaté (yellow card) | Stadium: Borussia-Park; Attendance: 13,000; Referee: Robin Braun |

== Competitions ==
=== Overall record ===
| Competition | First match | Last match | Starting round | Final position | Record | | | | | | | |
| Competition | First match | Last match | Starting round | Final position | Pld | W | D | L | GF | GA | GD | Win % |
|---|---|---|---|---|---|---|---|---|---|---|---|---|
| Ligue 1 | 13 August 2023 | 19 May 2024 | Matchday 1 | 12th | 34 | 10 | 12 | 12 | 43 | 48 | −5 | 29.41 |
| Coupe de France | 6 January 2024 | 7 February 2024 | Round of 64 | Round of 16 | 3 | 2 | 0 | 1 | 7 | 5 | +2 | 66.67 |
| Total | | | | | 37 | 12 | 12 | 13 | 50 | 53 | −3 | 32.43 |

Source: Soccerway

=== Ligue 1 ===
==== League table ====
| Pos | Team | Pld | W | D | L | GF | GA | GD | Pts |
|---|---|---|---|---|---|---|---|---|---|
| 10 | Rennes | 34 | 12 | 10 | 12 | 53 | 46 | +7 | 46 |
| 11 | Toulouse | 34 | 11 | 10 | 13 | 42 | 46 | −4 | 43 |
| 12 | Montpellier (Note: Montpellier was deducted one point for uncontrolled crowd trouble that caused the abandonment of its match against Clermont.) | 34 | 10 | 12 | 12 | 43 | 48 | −5 | 41 |
| 13 | Strasbourg | 34 | 10 | 9 | 15 | 38 | 50 | −12 | 39 |
| 14 | Nantes | 34 | 9 | 6 | 19 | 30 | 55 | −25 | 33 |

Source: Ligue 1
Rules for classification: 1) Points; 2) Goal difference; 3) Head-to-head points; 4) Head-to-head goal difference; 5) Head-to-head goals scored; 6) Head-to-head away goals scored; 7) Goals scored; 8) Away goals scored; 9) Fair-play points (Note: Head-to-head record is used only after all the matches between the teams in question have been played).

==== Results summary ====
| Overall | | | | | | | | Home | | | | | | Away | | | | | |
| Pld | W | D | L | GF | GA | GD | Pts | W | D | L | GF | GA | GD | W | D | L | GF | GA | GD |
|---|---|---|---|---|---|---|---|---|---|---|---|---|---|---|---|---|---|---|---|
| 34 | 10 | 12 | 12 | 43 | 48 | −5 | 42 | 3 | 9 | 5 | 20 | 23 | −3 | 7 | 3 | 7 | 23 | 25 | −2 |

Source: Ligue 1

==== Results by round ====
| Round | 1 | 2 | 3 | 4 | 5 | 6 | 7 | 8 | 9 | 10 | 11 | 12 | 13 | 14 | 15 | 16 | 17 | 18 | 19 | 20 | 21 | 22 | 23 | 24 | 25 | 26 | 27 | 28 | 29 | 30 | 31 | 32 | 33 | 34 |
|---|---|---|---|---|---|---|---|---|---|---|---|---|---|---|---|---|---|---|---|---|---|---|---|---|---|---|---|---|---|---|---|---|---|---|
| Ground | H | A | H | A | A | H | A | H | A | H | A | H | H | A | H | A | H | A | H | A | H | H | A | H | A | H | A | H | A | A | H | A | H | A |
| Result | D | W | L | L | D | D | W | D | L | W | L | D | L | L | D | W | D | L | D | L | L | W | L | D | W | L | W | W | D | W | D | W | L | D |
| Position | 8 | 4 | 9 | 14 | 14 | 13 | 9 | 12 | 14 | 11 | 13 | 12 | 14 | 13 | 14 | 12 | 12 | 12 | 12 | 13 | 15 | 14 | 15 | 16 | 13 | 14 | 13 | 13 | 13 | 12 | 12 | 10 | 12 | 12 |

Source: Ligue 1
A = Away; H = Home; W = Win; D = Draw; L = Loss

==== Matches ====
The league fixtures were unveiled on 29 June 2023.

| 13 August 2023 1 | Montpellier | 2–2 | Le Havre | Montpellier |
| 15:00 CEST (UTC+2) | Jullien (yellow card) 48'; Adams 58', 60' | Report | Lloris 6'; Sangante (yellow card) 55'; Targhalline (yellow card) 65'; Grandsir 90+1' | Stadium: Stade de la Mosson; Attendance: 15,852; Referee: Clément Turpin |

| 19 August 2023 2 | Lyon | 1–4 | Montpellier | Décines-Charpieu |
| 19:00 CEST (UTC+2) | Diomandé (yellow card) 13'; Lepenant (yellow card) 29'; Kumbedi (yellow card) 45+3'; Lacazette 70', (red card) 80'; Tagliafico (yellow card) 83' | Report | Nordin 20'; Al-Taamari 39', 66'; Kouyaté (yellow card) 51'; Adams 90' | Stadium: Parc Olympique Lyonnais; Attendance: 42,576; Referee: Mathieu Vernice |
Note: The match was originally scheduled for 17:00 CEST, but was postponed by two hours due to the heat wave in Lyon.

| 27 August 2023 3 | Montpellier | 1–3 | Reims | Montpellier |
| 15:00 CEST (UTC+2) | Al-Taamari 45+4'; Chotard (yellow card) 63' | Report | Abdelhamid 9'; Teuma 41', 56'; O. Diakité (penalty missed) 64'; Foket (yellow card) 72' | Stadium: Stade de la Mosson; Attendance: 14,476; Referee: Marc Bollengier |

| 3 September 2023 4 | Lille | 1–0 | Montpellier | Villeneuve-d'Ascq |
| 15:00 CEST (UTC+2) | Yazıcı 2'; Gomes (yellow card) 50'; Alexsandro (yellow card) 73' | Report | Omeragić (yellow card) 90+6' | Stadium: Stade Pierre-Mauroy; Attendance: 35,298; Referee: Benoît Millot |

| 17 September 2023 5 | Strasbourg | 2–2 | Montpellier | Strasbourg |
| 15:00 CEST (UTC+2) | Delaine (yellow card) 11'; Guilbert (yellow card) 45+6'; Lecomte 63' (o.g.); Mothiba 69'; Bakwa (yellow card) 76'; Emegha (yellow card) 90+7' | Report | Adams (yellow card) 29'; Khazri 35'; Nordin 40', (yellow card) 46'; Sylla (yellow card) 45+1'; Savanier (yellow card) 58'; Leroy (yellow card) 86'; Chotard (yellow card) 88' | Stadium: Stade de la Meinau; Attendance: 25,128; Referee: Pierre Gaillouste |

| 24 September 2023 6 | Montpellier | 0–0 | Rennes | Montpellier |
| 17:05 CEST (UTC+2) | Chotard (yellow card) 78'; Ferri (yellow card) 90+4' | Report | Yıldırım (yellow card) 32' | Stadium: Stade de la Mosson; Attendance: 15,430; Referee: Stéphanie Frappart |

| 1 October 2023 7 | Lorient | 0–3 | Montpellier | Lorient |
| 17:05 CEST (UTC+2) | Ponceau (yellow card) 20'; Talbi (yellow card) 33' | Report | Adams 30', 89'; Estève (yellow card) 61'; Savanier 73' (pen.) | Stadium: Stade du Moustoir; Attendance: 13,492; Referee: Jérémy Stinat |

| 22 October 2023 9 | Nantes | 2–0 | Montpellier | Nantes |
| 15:00 CEST (UTC+2) | Mollet 44', (yellow card) 64'; Bamba 74', (yellow card) 75' | Report | Kouyaté (yellow card) 90+2' | Stadium: Stade de la Beaujoire; Attendance: 26,864; Referee: Marc Bollengier |

| 29 October 2023 10 | Montpellier | 3–0 | Toulouse | Montpellier |
| 15:00 CET (UTC+1) | Adams 13', 72'; Fayad (yellow card) 30', (goal) 63'; Kouyaté (yellow card) 45+2' | Report | Suazo (yellow card) 33'; Magri (yellow card) 38'; Schmidt (yellow card) 65' | Stadium: Stade de la Mosson; Attendance: 13,209; Referee: Thomas Léonard |

| 3 November 2023 11 | Paris Saint-Germain | 3–0 | Montpellier | Paris |
| 21:00 CET (UTC+1) | Lee 10'; Zaïre-Emery 58'; Vitinha 66'; Mukiele (yellow card) 82' | Report | | Stadium: Parc des Princes; Attendance: 47,647; Referee: Ruddy Buquet |

| 10 November 2023 12 | Montpellier | 0–0 | Nice | Montpellier |
| 21:00 CET (UTC+1) | | Report | Rosario (yellow card) 5'; Boudaoui (yellow card) 45+1'; Todibo (yellow card) 72'; Bard (yellow card) 82' | Stadium: Stade de la Mosson; Attendance: 13,452; Referee: Hakim Ben El Hadj |

| 26 November 2023 13 | Montpellier | 1–3 | Brest | Montpellier |
| 15:00 CET (UTC+1) | Savanier (yellow card) 24', (goal) 51' (pen.); Adams (yellow card) 90+6' | Report | Estève 20' (o.g.); Lees-Melou (yellow card) 30'; Del Castillo (yellow card) 45'; Pereira Lage 64'; Doumbia 90+3' | Stadium: Stade de la Mosson; Attendance: 12,311; Referee: Pierre Gaillouste |

| 29 November 2023 8 | Montpellier | 1–1 | Clermont | Montpellier |
| 19:00 CET (UTC+1) | Fayad (yellow card) 40'; Sainte-Luce (yellow card) 52'; Savanier 86' (pen.); Omeragić (yellow card) 90+4'; Estève (yellow card) 90+7' (yellow-red card) 90+7'; Leroy (yellow card) 90+7' | Report | Gonalons 7', (yellow card) 90+7'; Konaté (yellow card) 8'; Caufriez (yellow card) 38' (yellow-red card) 90+7'; Pelmard (yellow card) 74'; Keïta (yellow card) 76'; Borges (red card) 90+7' | Stadium: Stade de la Mosson; Attendance: 0 Referee: Mathieu Vernice |
Note: The match was originally played on 8 October 2023, but was abandoned in second-half stoppage time, with Montpellier leading 4–2, after a firework thrown from a Montpellier stand exploded near Clermont goalkeeper Mory Diaw. The teams were then ordered to replay the match from the beginning behind closed doors at a later date.

| 3 December 2023 14 | Monaco | 2–0 | Montpellier | Monaco |
| 15:00 CET (UTC+1) | Minamino 9'; Vanderson (yellow card) 20'; Golovin (yellow card) 75'; Ben Yedder 90+2' | Report | Savanier (yellow card) 45'; Kouyaté (red card) 69'; Chotard (yellow card) 84'; Tchato (yellow card) 90' | Stadium: Stade Louis II; Attendance: 4,599; Referee: Jérémy Stinat |

| 8 December 2023 15 | Montpellier | 0–0 | Lens | Montpellier |
| 21:00 CET (UTC+1) | Delaye (yellow card) 84'; Ferri (yellow card) 90+2' | Report | Danso (yellow card) 12'; Frankowski (yellow card) 29'; Gradit (yellow card) 90+2' | Stadium: Stade de la Mosson; Attendance: 14,159; Referee: Stéphanie Frappart |

| 17 December 2023 16 | Metz | 0–1 | Montpellier | Metz |
| 15:00 CET (UTC+1) | Diallo (yellow card) 53'; Udol (yellow card) 90+2' | Report | Estève 9'; Jullien (yellow card) 74'; Lecomte (yellow card) 85' | Stadium: Stade Saint-Symphorien; Attendance: 23,473; Referee: Marc Bollengier |

| 20 December 2023 17 | Montpellier | 1–1 | Marseille | Montpellier |
| 21:00 CET (UTC+1) | Fayad 14'; Jullien (yellow card) 44'; Savanier (yellow card) 90+4' | Report | Veretout 52'; Gigot (yellow card) 55' | Stadium: Stade de la Mosson; Attendance: 18,565; Referee: Thomas Léonard |

| 14 January 2024 18 | Brest | 2–0 | Montpellier | Brest |
| 15:00 CET (UTC+1) | Magnetti (yellow card) 45', (goal) 48'; Le Douaron 90+2' | Report | Chotard (yellow card) 44'; Julien (yellow card) 57' | Stadium: Stade Francis-Le Blé; Attendance: 12,712; Referee: Jérémie Pignard |

| 28 January 2024 19 | Montpellier | 0–0 | Lille | Montpellier |
| 13:00 CET (UTC+1) | Jullien (yellow card) 26'; Savanier (yellow card) 61'; Khazri (yellow card) 62'; Coulibaly (yellow card) 63' | Report | Bouaddi (yellow card) 37' (yellow-red card) 45+2'; Santos (yellow card) 66' | Stadium: Stade de la Mosson; Attendance: 12,575; Referee: Hakim Ben El Hadj |

| 3 February 2024 20 | Rennes | 2–1 | Montpellier | Rennes |
| 17:00 CET (UTC+1) | Terrier 3'; Truffert (yellow card) 45+4'; Kalimuendo 48' (pen.), (yellow card) 53'; Yıldırım (yellow card) 80'; Le Fée (yellow card) 86' | Report | Sagnan (yellow card) 12'; Khazri (yellow card) 29'; Mincarelli (yellow card) 47'; Savanier 73' | Stadium: Roazhon Park; Attendance: 24,898; Referee: Mathieu Vernice |

| 11 February 2024 21 | Montpellier | 1–2 | Lyon | Montpellier |
| 17:05 CET (UTC+1) | Nordin 23'; Ferri (yellow card) 90' | Report | Tagliafico (yellow card) 28'; Lacazette 74'; Caqueret 82'; Orban (yellow card) 90' | Stadium: Stade de la Mosson; Attendance: 15,519; Referee: Pierre Gaillouste |

| 18 February 2024 22 | Montpellier | 3–0 | Metz | Montpellier |
| 15:00 CET (UTC+1) | Sylla 3'; Kouyaté (yellow card) 13'; Sagnan (yellow card) 30', (goal) 50'; Omeragić (yellow card) 69'; Savanier 86' (pen.) | Report | Asoro (yellow card) 78'; Candé (yellow card) 83'; Camara (yellow card) 90+4' | Stadium: Stade de la Mosson; Attendance: 12,532; Referee: Jérémy Stinat |

| 25 February 2024 23 | Marseille | 4–1 | Montpellier | Marseille |
| 20:45 CET (UTC+1) | Ndiaye 31'; Aubameyang (yellow card) 32', (goal) 43', 62' (pen.); Harit (yellow card) 65'; Sacko 82' (o.g.) | Report | Al-Tamari 5'; Sylla (yellow card) 32'; Hefti (yellow card) 48'; Sagnan (yellow card) 75'; Kouyaté (yellow card) 86' | Stadium: Stade Vélodrome; Attendance: 61,263; Referee: Jérémie Pignard |

| 3 March 2024 24 | Montpellier | 2–2 | Strasbourg | Montpellier |
| 15:00 CET (UTC+1) | Ferri (yellow card) 19'; Doukouré 71' (o.g.); Nordin 87' | Report | Sissoko (yellow card) 34'; Diarra 47' (pen.), (yellow card) 66'; Emegha (yellow card) 83', (goal) 83' | Stadium: Stade de la Mosson; Attendance: 11,635; Referee: Stéphanie Frappart |

| 8 March 2024 25 | Nice | 1–2 | Montpellier | Nice |
| 21:00 CET (UTC+1) | Boga 12'; Rosario (yellow card) 42' | Report | Todibo 10' (o.g.); Savanier 42' (pen.); Khazri (yellow card) 47'; Leroy (yellow card) 90+2' | Stadium: Allianz Riviera; Attendance: 21,819; Referee: Ruddy Buquet |

| 17 March 2024 26 | Montpellier | 2–6 | Paris Saint-Germain | Montpellier |
| 20:45 CET (UTC+1) | Nordin 30'; Savanier 45+3' (pen.) | Report | Vitinha 14'; K. Mbappé 22', 50', 63'; Beraldo (yellow card) 38'; Donnarumma (yellow card) 45'; Lee 53'; Mendes (yellow card) 72', (goal) 89' | Stadium: Stade de la Mosson; Attendance: 19,202; Referee: Florent Batta |

| 31 March 2024 27 | Le Havre | 0–2 | Montpellier | Le Havre |
| 15:00 CEST (UTC+2) | Négo (yellow card) 31'; Casimir (yellow card) 70' | Report | Sagnan (yellow card) 70'; Omeragić (yellow card) 70'; Ferri 72'; Jullien 80' | Stadium: Stade Océane; Attendance: 20,556; Referee: Mathieu Vernice |

| 7 April 2024 28 | Montpellier | 2–0 | Lorient | Montpellier |
| 15:00 CEST (UTC+2) | Ferri (yellow card) 14'; Savanier (yellow card) 42', (goal) 55' (pen.); Khazri (yellow card) 61'; Karamoh 90' | Report | Yongwa (yellow card) 44'; F. Mendy (yellow card) 45+1'; Adjei (yellow card) 52'; Ponceau (yellow card) 58'; Bamba (yellow card) 59'; Katseris (yellow card) 90+5' | Stadium: Stade de la Mosson; Attendance: 15,234; Referee: Romain Lissorgue |

| 14 April 2024 29 | Clermont | 1–1 | Montpellier | Clermont-Ferrand |
| 15:00 CEST (UTC+2) | Cham 45+5' (pen.); Matsima (yellow card) 90+4' | Report | Coulibaly 56', (yellow card) 57' | Stadium: Stade Gabriel-Montpied; Attendance: 10,174; Referee: Thomas Léonard |

| 21 April 2024 30 | Reims | 1–2 | Montpellier | Reims |
| 15:00 CEST (UTC+2) | Abdelhamid (yellow card) 42'; Munetsi (yellow card) 49'; Agbadou 66'; Bojang (yellow card) 90+2' | Report | Sagnan 26', (yellow card) 69'; Sylla (yellow card) 47'; Khazri (yellow card) 82'; Al-Tamari 87' | Stadium: Stade Auguste-Delaune; Attendance: 14,183; Referee: Pierre Gaillouste |

| 26 April 2024 31 | Montpellier | 1–1 | Nantes | Montpellier |
| 21:00 CEST (UTC+2) | Adams 2'; Savanier (yellow card) 24'; Tchato (yellow card) 45'; Mincarelli (red card) 90+1'; Nordin (red card) 90+5' | Report | Abline 7'; Sissoko (yellow card) 45+4' | Stadium: Stade de la Mosson; Attendance: 17,331; Referee: Jérémy Stinat |

| 3 May 2024 32 | Toulouse | 1–2 | Montpellier | Toulouse |
| 19:00 CEST (UTC+2) | Dallinga 34'; Nicolaisen (yellow card) 54' (yellow-red card) 83'; Diarra (yellow card) 60' | Report | Savanier (yellow card) 26', (goal) 27', (red card) 65'; Leroy (yellow card) 44'; Fayad 81'; Karamoh (yellow card) 90+4' | Stadium: Stadium de Toulouse; Attendance: 24,740; Referee: Marc Bollengier |

| 12 May 2024 33 | Montpellier | 0–2 | Monaco | Montpellier |
| 21:00 CEST (UTC+2) | Ferri (yellow card) 19' | Report | Ouattara 52'; Fofana 65'; Singo (yellow card) 72' | Stadium: Stade de la Mosson; Attendance: 14,829; Referee: Stéphanie Frappart |

| 19 May 2024 34 | Lens | 2–2 | Montpellier | Lens |
| 21:00 CEST (UTC+2) | Wahi 4'; Machado 45+3' | Report | Maamma 58'; Mincarelli 74'; Khazri (yellow card) 90+5' | Stadium: Stade Bollaert-Delelis; Attendance: 37,433; Referee: Thomas Léonard |

=== Coupe de France ===
| 6 January 2024 Round of 64 | Amiens | 1–2 | Montpellier | Amiens |
| 18:00 CET (UTC+1) | Kaïboué (yellow card) 28'; Mafouta 59' | Report | Chotard (yellow card) 37'; Assogba 43' (o.g.); Yeboah 56' (pen.) | Stadium: Stade de la Licorne; Attendance: 5,652; Referee: Clément Turpin |

| 24 January 2024 Round of 32 | Feignies Aulnoye | 0–4 | Montpellier | Maubeuge |
| 18:00 CET (UTC+1) | Bridoux (yellow card) 18'; Hospital (yellow card) 56' | Report | Omeragić 59'; Nordin (yellow card) 61'; Gueguin (yellow card) 65'; Sainte-Luce (yellow card) 69'; Adams 74', 90+2'; Delaye 90' | Stadium: Stade Léo Lagrange; Attendance: 1,797; Referee: Willy Delajod |
Note: The match was originally scheduled for 20 January 2024, but was postponed due to heavy snow.

| 7 February 2024 Round of 16 | Montpellier | 1–4 | Nice | Montpellier |
| 20:30 CET (UTC+1) | Savanier (yellow card) 34'; Lecomte (yellow card) 64'; Ndiaye (penalty missed) 74'; Sagnan 74' | Report | Ndayishimiye 29'; Claude-Maurice (yellow card) 34', (goal) 62' (pen.); Louchet 37'; Cho 39'; Rosario (yellow card) 46'; Baldé (yellow card) 71' | Stadium: Stade de la Mosson; Attendance: 5,769; Referee: François Letexier |
