= Nicolas Pays =

French footballer (born 2003)

Personal information
- Date of birth: 7 July 2003 (age 23)
- Place of birth: Le Puy-en-Velay, France
- Height: 1.80 m (5 ft 11 in)
- Position: Attacking midfielder

Team information
- Current team: Montpellier
- Number: 18

Youth career
- –2015: US Blavozy
- 2015–2018: Le Puy
- 2018–2022: Clermont

Senior career*
Years	Team	Apps	(Gls)
2021–2022	Clermont B	8	(1)
2022–2023	US Blavozy		
2023–2025	Le Puy	36	(8)
2025–	Montpellier	39	(4)
- * Club domestic league appearances and goals as of 11 May 2026

Nicolas Pays (born 7 July 2003) is a French professional footballer who plays as an attacking midfielder for Ligue 2 club Montpellier.

== Career ==
Born in Le Puy-en-Velay, Pays grew up in the nearby commune of Blavozy, where he played for local team US Blavozy. In 2015, he signed for Le Puy, before joining the academy of Clermont in 2018. He went on to play for Clermont's reserve side in the Championnat National 3 prior to returning to his hometown club US Blavozy for the 2022–23 Régional 1 season. In 2023, Pays returned to Championnat National 2 club Le Puy.

On 21 December 2024, in the round of 64 of the Coupe de France, Pays scored in a 4–0 Le Puy victory over Ligue 1 club Montpellier. His performance impressed Montpellier head coach Jean-Louis Gasset. On 29 January 2025, Pays signed for Montpellier for no transfer fee. He made his Montpellier and Ligue 1 debut as a substitute in a 2–0 defeat away to Strasbourg on 9 February 2025.

== Career statistics ==
As of match played 19 April 2025

Appearances and goals by club, season and competition
Club	Season	League			Cup		Europe		Other		Total	
Club	Season	Division	Apps	Goals	Apps	Goals	Apps	Goals	Apps	Goals	Apps	Goals
Clermont B	2021–22	National 3	8	1	—		—		—		8	1
Le Puy	2023–24	CFA 2	21	5	7	2	—		—		28	7
Le Puy	2024–25	CFA 2	15	3	6	3	—		—		21	6
Le Puy	Total		36	8	13	5	—		—		49	13
Montpellier	2024–25	Ligue 1	9	0	—		—		—		9	0
Career total			53	9	13	5	0	0	0	0	66	14

== Honours ==
US Blavozy

- Coupe de la Haute-Loire: 2022–23
