= Mouanga =

Mouanga is a surname. Notable people with the surname include:

- Kévin Mouanga (born 2000), French footballer
- Yaël Mouanga (born 2005), French footballer
