= Hervé Mirouze =

French footballer and coach (1924-1998)

Personal information
- Date of birth: 10 December 1924
- Place of birth: Montpellier, France
- Date of death: 17 July 1998 (aged 73)
- Height: 1.73 m (5 ft 8 in)
- Position: Defender

Senior career*
| Years | Team | Apps | (Gls) |
| 1945–1948 | Montpellier | | |
| 1948–1949 | Cannes | | |
| 1949–1951 | Alès | | |
| 1951–1958 | Montpellier | | |

Managerial career
- 1955–1956: Montpellier
- 1957–1963: SO Montpellier
- 1963–1967: Toulon
- 1970–1974: Montpellier-Littoral SC
- * Club domestic league appearances and goals

Hervé Mirouze (10 December 1924 – 17 July 1998) was a French football player and coach.

He spent all his playing career as a defender at his local club, SO Montpellier, AS Cannes and Olympique Alès. In 1955, Mirouze became the coach of the Montpelliérain club. He also coached SC Toulon.

== Honours ==
=== Coach ===
Montpellier

- French Division 2: 1960–61
