= Lucas Mincarelli =

French footballer (born 2004)

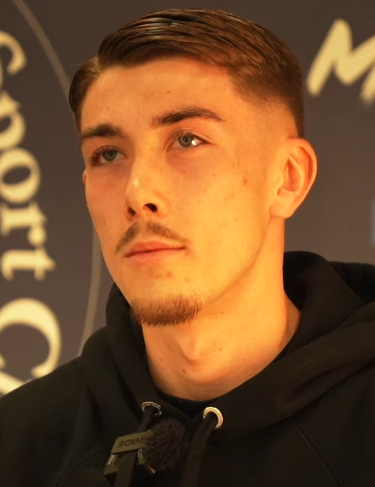
- Mincarelli in 2024

Personal information
- Full name: Lucas Mincarelli Davin
- Date of birth: 5 January 2004 (age 22)
- Place of birth: Saint-Martin-d'Hères, France
- Position: Left-back

Team information
- Current team: Estrela da Amadora
- Number: 3

Youth career
- 2010–2016: FC Lambescain
- 2016–2019: Marignane Gignac
- 2019: Luynes Sports
- 2019–2020: Pays d'Aix
- 2020–2021: Istres

Senior career*
Years	Team	Apps	(Gls)
2021–2022	Istres	12	(1)
2022–	Montpellier B	32	(4)
2023–	Montpellier	46	(2)

International career
2024	France U20	3	(0)
- * Club domestic league appearances and goals as of 11 May 2026

Lucas Mincarelli Davin (born 5 January 2004) is a French professional footballer who plays as a left-back for Primeira Liga club Estrela da Amadora.

== Career ==
Mincarelli is a youth product of FC Lambescain, Marignane Gignac, Luynes Sports, Pays d'Aix, and Istres. He began his senior and professional career with Istres in the Championnat National 3 in 2021. On 16 June 2022, he signed for Montpellier on a two-year contract, and was initially assigned to their reserves. On 13 August 2023, he made his senior debut with Montpellier in a 2–2 Ligue 1 tie with Le Havre as a late substitute. His first start came in a 2–0 defeat to Monaco on 3 December 2023.

== Personal life ==
Born in France, Mincarelli is of Italian descent.

== Career statistics ==
As of match played 17 May 2025

Appearances and goals by club, season and competition
Club	Season	League			Cup		Total	
Club	Season	Division	Apps	Goals	Apps	Goals	Apps	Goals
Istres	2021–22	National 3	12	1	0	0	12	1
Montpellier B	2022–23	National 3	20	3	—		20	3
Montpellier B	2023–24	National 3	6	1	—		6	1
Montpellier B	2024–25	National 3	3	0	—		3	0
Montpellier B	Total		29	4	—		29	4
Montpellier	2023–24	Ligue 1	13	1	1	0	14	1
Montpellier	2024–25	Ligue 1	10	1	0	0	10	1
Montpellier	Total		23	2	1	0	24	2
Career total			61	7	1	0	62	7
