= Yaël Mouanga =

French footballer (born 2005)

Personal information
- Full name: Yaël Mouanga Boudzoumou
- Date of birth: 23 July 2005 (age 21)
- Place of birth: Créteil, France
- Height: 1.83 m (6 ft 0 in)
- Position: Centre-back

Team information
- Current team: Montpellier
- Number: 23

Youth career
- –2022: Bordeaux

Senior career*
Years	Team	Apps	(Gls)
2022–2024	Bordeaux B	25	(0)
2024	Bordeaux	1	(0)
2024–	Montpellier B	9	(1)
2024–	Montpellier	35	(0)
- * Club domestic league appearances and goals as of 11 May 2026

Yaël Mouanga Boudzoumou (born 23 July 2005) is a French professional footballer who plays as a centre-back for Ligue 2 club Montpellier.

== Career ==
Mouanga made his professional debut with Bordeaux in Ligue 2 on 10 May 2024, coming on as a substitute in a 4–2 defeat to Concarneau. It was his only first-team appearance for the club. In August 2024, he joined Montpellier's reserves on a free transfer. On 26 October, newly appointed first-team manager Jean-Louis Gasset called him up for a Ligue 1 match against Toulouse. The following day, amid an injury crisis and after impressing Gasset in training, Mouanga made his Ligue 1 debut as a starter. Despite Montpellier's 3–0 defeat and Mouanga's mixed performance, Gasset praised his effort and highlighted his potential.

== Personal life ==
Born in France, Mouanga is of Congolese descent from the Republic of the Congo. He holds both French and Congolese citizenship.

== Career statistics ==
As of 1 July 2026

Appearances, goals, and clean sheets by club, season, and competition
Club	Season	League			Cup		Other		Total	
Club	Season	Division	Apps	Goals	Apps	Goals	Apps	Goals	Apps	Goals
Bordeaux B	2021–22	National 3	3	0	—		—		3	0
Bordeaux B	2022–23	National 3	18	0	—		—		18	0
Bordeaux B	2023–24	National 3	4	0	—		—		4	0
Bordeaux B	Total		25	0			—		25	0
Bordeaux	2023–24	Ligue 2	1	0	0	0	—		1	0
Montpellier B	2024–25	National 3	7	0	—		—		7	0
Montpellier B	2025–26	National 3	2	1	—		—		2	1
Montpellier B	Total		9	1	—		—		9	1
Montpellier	2024–25	Ligue 1	14	0	0	0	—		14	0
Montpellier	2025–26	Ligue 2	21	0	2	0	—		23	0
Montpellier	Total		35	0	2	0	—		37	0
Career total			70	1	2	0	0	0	72	1
