= Belmin Dizdarević =

Bosnian footballer (born 2001)

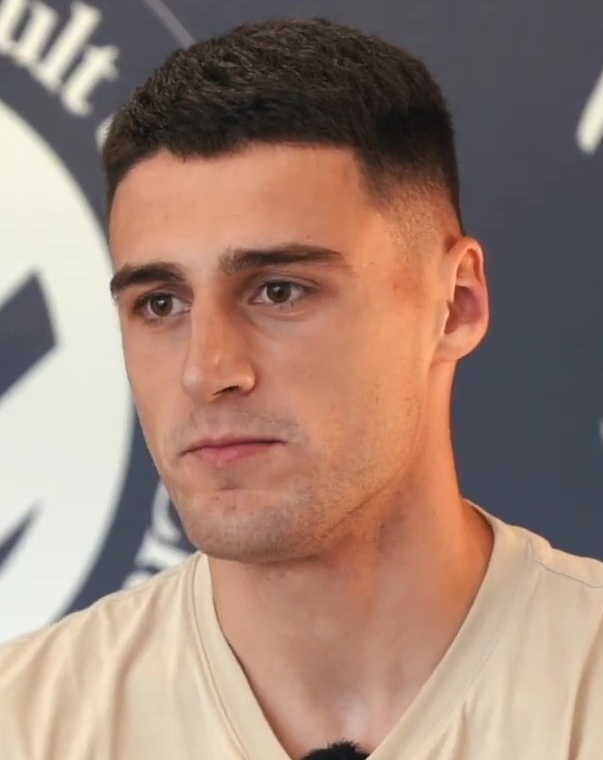
- Dizdarević in 2023

Personal information
- Date of birth: 9 August 2001 (age 25)
- Place of birth: Zenica, Bosnia and Herzegovina
- Height: 1.89 m (6 ft 2 in)
- Position: Goalkeeper

Team information
- Current team: Standard Liège
- Number: 35

Youth career
- 2012–2016: Čelik Zenica
- 2016–2019: Sarajevo

Senior career*
Years	Team	Apps	(Gls)
2019–2023	Sarajevo	47	(0)
2021	→ Mladost Doboj Kakanj (loan)	0	(0)
2023–2025	Montpellier B	17	(0)
2023–2025	Montpellier	0	(0)
2025–2026	Velež Mostar	4	(0)
2026–	Standard Liège	0	(0)

International career
2016	Bosnia and Herzegovina U15	2	(0)
2017	Bosnia and Herzegovina U16	3	(0)
2017–2018	Bosnia and Herzegovina U17	6	(0)
2018–2019	Bosnia and Herzegovina U18	3	(0)
2019	Bosnia and Herzegovina U19	5	(0)
2021	Bosnia and Herzegovina U21	3	(0)
2021	Bosnia and Herzegovina	1	(0)
- * Club domestic league appearances and goals as of 31 May 2026

Belmin Dizdarević (Bosnian pronunciation: [bělmiːn dizdâːreʋitɕ]; born 9 August 2001) is a Bosnian professional footballer who plays as a goalkeeper for Standard Liège.

Dizdarević started his professional career at Sarajevo, who loaned him to Mladost Doboj Kakanj in 2021. Two years later, he joined Montpellier.

A former youth international for Bosnia and Herzegovina, Dizdarević made his senior international debut in 2021.

== Club career ==
=== Sarajevo ===
Dizdarević started playing football at his hometown club Čelik Zenica, before joining Sarajevo's youth academy in 2016. In June 2018, he signed his first professional contract with the team. He made his professional debut against GOŠK Gabela on 25 May 2019 at the age of 17.

In February 2021, he was loaned to Mladost Doboj Kakanj until the end of the season.

=== Montpellier ===
In July 2023, Dizdarević was transferred to French outfit Montpellier for an undisclosed fee.

=== Velež Mostar ===
On 6 July 2025, Dizdarević signed with Velež Mostar.

== International career ==
Dizdarević represented Bosnia and Herzegovina at all youth levels.

In December 2021, he received his first senior call-up, for a friendly game against the United States, and debuted in that game on 19 December.

== Career statistics ==
=== Club ===
As of match played 15 February 2025

Appearances and goals by club, season and competition
Club	Season	League			Cup		Continental		Total	
Club	Season	Division	Apps	Goals	Apps	Goals	Apps	Goals	Apps	Goals
Sarajevo	2018–19	Bosnian Premier League	1	0	—		—		1	0
Sarajevo	2019–20	Bosnian Premier League	0	0	1	0	0	0	1	0
Sarajevo	2020–21	Bosnian Premier League	1	0	0	0	0	0	1	0
Sarajevo	2021–22	Bosnian Premier League	30	0	7	0	0	0	37	0
Sarajevo	2022–23	Bosnian Premier League	15	0	1	0	—		16	0
Sarajevo	Total		47	0	9	0	0	0	56	0
Montpellier B	2023–24	Championnat National 3	9	0	—		—		9	0
Montpellier B	2024–25	Championnat National 3	7	0	—		—		7	0
Montpellier B	Total		16	0	—		—		16	0
Montpellier	2023–24	Ligue 1	0	0	0	0	—		0	0
Montpellier	2024–25	Ligue 1	0	0	0	0	—		0	0
Montpellier	Total		0	0	0	0	—		0	0
Career total			63	0	9	0	0	0	72	0

=== International ===
As of match played 19 December 2021

National team	Year	Apps	Goals
Bosnia and Herzegovina
Bosnia and Herzegovina	2021	1	0
Total		1	0

== Honours ==
Sarajevo

- Premier League of Bosnia and Hezergovina: 2018–19, 2019–20
- Bosnian and Herzegovina Football Cup: 2018–19; runner-up: 2021–22
