= Théo Chennahi =

French footballer (born 2005)

Personal information
- Date of birth: 6 February 2005 (age 21)
- Place of birth: Marseille, France
- Height: 1.82 m (6 ft 0 in)
- Position: Midfielder

Team information
- Current team: Montpellier
- Number: 44

Youth career
- 2013–2017: Burel FC
- 2017–2019: ASPTT Marseille
- 2019–2020: SC Air Bel
- 2020–2024: Montpellier

Senior career*
Years	Team	Apps	(Gls)
2022–2025	Montpellier II	37	(3)
2024–	Montpellier	36	(1)
- * Club domestic league appearances and goals as of 11 May 2026

Théo Chennahi (born 6 February 2005) is a French professional footballer who plays as a midfielder for Ligue 2 club Montpellier.

== Club career ==
Chennahi is a youth product of Burel FC, ASPTT Marseille and SC Air Bel, before moving to Montpellier's academy in 2020 on a 5-year trainee contract to finish his development. In 2022 he was promoted to Montpellier's reserves, and he started training with their senior side in 2024. He made his senior and professional debut with Montpellier in a 3–0 Ligue 1 loss to Rennes on 15 September 2024.

== Personal life ==
Born in France, Chennahi is French.

== Career statistics ==
As of match played 17 May 2025

Appearances, goals, and clean sheets by club, season, and competition
Club	Season	League			Coupe de France		Europe		Other		Total	
Club	Season	Division	Apps	Goals	Apps	Goals	Apps	Goals	Apps	Goals	Apps	Goals
Montpellier B	2022–23	Championnat National 3	6	0	—		—		—		6	0
Montpellier B	2023–24	Championnat National 3	17	2	—		—		—		17	2
Montpellier B	2024–25	Championnat National 3	11	1	—		—		—		11	1
Montpellier B	Total		34	3	—		—		—		34	3
Montpellier	2024–25	Ligue 1	4	0	0	0	—		—		4	0
Career total			38	3	0	0	0	0	0	0	38	3
