= Wilfried Ndollo Bille =

Cameroonian footballer (born 2005)

Wilfried Ndollo
Personal information
- Full name: Wilfried Chancy Ndollo Bille
- Date of birth: 13 July 2005 (age 21)
- Place of birth: Mbanga, Cameroon
- Height: 1.72 m (5 ft 8 in)
- Position: Right-back

Team information
- Current team: Montpellier
- Number: 49

Youth career
- 2020–2023: Academy Foot de Douala
- 2023–2024: Montpellier

Senior career*
Years	Team	Apps	(Gls)
2024–	Montpellier B	29	(0)
2025–	Montpellier	8	(0)
- * Club domestic league appearances and goals as of 16 May 2026

Wilfried Chancy Ndollo Bille (born 13 July 2005) is a Cameroonian professional footballer who plays as a right-back for Ligue 2 club Montpellier.

== Career ==
Ndollo came through the ranks of the Academy Foot de Douala in his native Cameroon. He joined French club Montpellier in August 2023. On 8 March 2025, he made his professional and Ligue 1 debut for the club as a late-match substitute in a 1–0 defeat to Lille. He made his first start in a 2–0 defeat to Angers on 13 April 2025, playing the full 90 minutes.

== Career statistics ==
As of 3 April 2026

Appearances and goals by club, season and competition
Club	Season	League			Cup		Other		Total	
Club	Season	Division	Apps	Goals	Apps	Goals	Apps	Goals	Apps	Goals
Montpellier B	2023–24	National 3	4	0	—		—		4	0
Montpellier B	2024–25	National 3	11	0	—		—		11	0
Montpellier B	2025–26	National 3	8	0	—		—		8	0
Montpellier B	Total		23	0	—		—		23	0
Montpellier	2024–25	Ligue 1	8	0	—		—		8	0
Career total			31	0	0	0	0	0	31	0
