= Modibo Sagnan =

Malian-French footballer (born 1999)

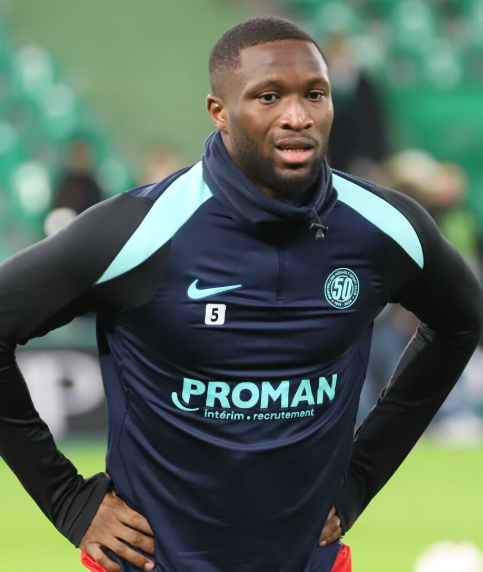
- Sagnan in 2024

Personal information
- Full name: Modibo Sagnan
- Date of birth: 14 April 1999 (age 27)
- Place of birth: Saint-Denis, France
- Height: 1.87 m (6 ft 2 in)
- Position: Centre back

Team information
- Current team: Çaykur Rizespor
- Number: 93

Youth career
- 2009–2012: CS Villetaneuse
- 2012–2017: Lens

Senior career*
Years	Team	Apps	(Gls)
2017–2019	Lens II	24	(1)
2018–2019	Lens	13	(0)
2019–2023	Real Sociedad	16	(0)
2019	→ Lens (loan)	1	(0)
2020	→ Mirandés (loan)	13	(0)
2021–2022	→ Tondela (loan)	27	(1)
2022–2023	→ Utrecht (loan)	25	(1)
2023–2024	Utrecht	13	(1)
2024–2026	Montpellier	40	(4)
2025–2026	→ Çaykur Rizespor (loan)	20	(1)
2026–	Çaykur Rizespor	6	(0)

International career^{‡}
2021	France Olympic	3	(0)
2024–	Mali	7	(2)
- * Club domestic league appearances and goals as of 21 September 2026 ‡ National team caps and goals as of 17 November 2026

Modibo Sagnan (born 14 April 1999) is a Malian professional footballer who plays as a centre back for Turkish Süper Lig club Çaykur Rizespor on loan from Montpellier. Born in France, he represented his country of birth's France Olympic football team before switching his allegiance to the Mali national football team.

== Early life ==
Modibo Sagnan was born on 14 April 1999 in Saint-Denis, Seine-Saint-Denis in France.

== Club career ==
=== Lens ===
A youth product of Lens, Sagnan signed his first professional contract with them on 28 July 2017, tying him down to the club for three years. Sagnan made his professional debut for Lens in a 1–0 Ligue 2 loss to Sochaux on 30 January 2018.

=== Real Sociedad ===
On 30 January 2019, Sagnan joined La Liga side Real Sociedad for an estimated fee of €5 million, and was immediately loaned back to Lens for the remainder of the season. The following 31 January, after failing to make a first team appearance, he was loaned to Segunda División side Mirandés until June.

Sagnan made his debut for the Txuri-urdin on 3 October 2020, replacing Andoni Gorosabel in a 3–0 home win over Getafe CF. On 31 August of the following year, after featuring sparingly, he moved to Portuguese Primeira Liga side Tondela on a one-year loan deal.

=== Utrecht ===
On 11 July 2022, Sagnan was loaned to Utrecht in the Netherlands, with an option to buy. On 2 June 2023, he signed a permanent three-year contract with the club.

=== Montpellier ===
On 1 February 2024, Sagnan signed for Ligue 1 club Montpellier.

==== Loan to Çaykur Rizespor ====
On 2 August 2025, Sagnan signed for Süper Lig club Çaykur Rizespor on loan with an option to buy.

== International career ==
Sagnan made his debut for the senior Mali national team on 26 March 2024 in a friendly against Nigeria.

== Personal life ==
Sagnan was born in France to a Burkinabé and Mauritanian father and a Malian mother. He was raised a Muslim.

== Career statistics ==
=== Club ===
As of match played 21 September 2026

Appearances and goals by club, season and competition
Club	Season	League			National cup		League cup		Continental		Total	
Club	Season	Division	Apps	Goals	Apps	Goals	Apps	Goals	Apps	Goals	Apps	Goals
Lens	2017–18	Ligue 2	3	0	2	0	0	0	—		5	0
Lens	2018–19	Ligue 2	10	0	2	0	1	1	—		13	1
Lens	Total		13	0	4	0	1	1	0	0	18	1
Real Sociedad	2019–20	La Liga	0	0	1	0	—		—		1	0
Real Sociedad	2020–21	La Liga	16	0	1	0	—		4 (Note: Appearance(s) in UEFA Europa League)	0	21	0
Real Sociedad	Total		16	0	2	0	0	0	4	0	22	0
Lens (loan)	2018–19	Ligue 2	1	0	0	0	—		—		1	0
Mirandés (loan)	2019–20	Segunda División	13	0	0	0	—		—		13	0
Tondela	2021–22	Primeira Liga	27	1	3	0	0	0	—		30	1
Utrecht	2022–23	Eredivisie	25	1	3	0	—		0	0	28	1
Utrecht	2023–24	Eredivisie	13	1	1	0	—		—		14	1
Utrecht	Total		38	2	4	0	—		0	0	42	2
Montpellier	2023–24	Ligue 1	13	2	1	1	—		—		14	3
Montpellier	2024–25	Ligue 1	27	2	0	0	—		—		27	2
Montpellier	Total		40	4	1	1	—		—		41	5
Çaykur Rizespor (loan)	2025–26	Süper Lig	20	1	3	0	—		—		23	1
Çaykur Rizespor	2026–27	Süper Lig	6	0	0	0	—		—		6	0
Career total			174	8	17	1	1	1	4	0	196	10

=== International ===
As of matches played on 17 November 2026

Appearances and goals by national team and year
National team	Year	Apps	Goals
Mali	2024	4	1
Mali	2026	3	1
Total		7	2

== Honours ==
Real Sociedad

- Copa del Rey: 2019–20
