= Louis Favre (French footballer) =

French footballer (1923–2008)

Personal information
- Date of birth: 23 October 1923
- Place of birth: Montpellier, France
- Date of death: 15 January 2008 (aged 84)
- Place of death: Montpellier, France

Senior career*
Years	Team	Apps	(Gls)
1941–1945	SO Montpellier		
1945–1946	AS Béziers		
1946–1950	Red Star		
1950–1953	Stade Français		
1953–1954	Olympique alésien		
1954–1957	FC Sète		
1957–1961	SO Montpellier		

Managerial career
- 1963–1968: SO Montpellier
- 1976: SO Montpellier
- * Club domestic league appearances and goals

Louis Favre (23 October 1923 – 15 January 2008) was a French football player and later manager. Youye played as a striker, then as a winger, then as a central midfielder.

== Playing career ==
Born in Montpellier, Louis Favre made his professional debut in 1941 with the club that trained him: SO Montpellier. He left for Béziers in 1945 and played an unofficial international game (against an army and air force selection) for France under 23s in January 1946 during which he came to the attention of scouts from Red Star. He joined Saint-Ouen in summer 1946.

A France B international, he was selected to play in two international games against Scotland and the Netherlands in April 1949, with the A team. One week before the game, Favre was injured during the derby against Racing club de Paris: a fractured fibula and double sprain. He was never picked again for France A. The following season, he fractured his fibula again.

After seven seasons in the capital, he returned to the Languedoc of his birth and signed for Olympique alésien before joining Sète where he played as a midfielder. He finished his career at the club where he started it: SOM.

== Managerial career ==
Once his playing career finished, he became manager of SO Montpellier from 1963 to 1968 during which the club transformed into Montpellier La Paillade where he was joint manager from 1974 to 1978.

== Sources ==
- Louis Favre est décédé, in L'Équipe, Sunday 19 January 2008, n°19 557, page 6.
- Coll., Red Star. Histoire d'un siècle, Paris, Red Star, 1999, p. 275 (including a passage on Alès from 53 to 54, taken from the guide Football 54)
- Gilles Gauthey, Le football professionnel français, "Index alphabétique des joueurs des clubs professionnels de 1932 à 1961", Paris, 1961, p. 36 (including passage on Alès from 53 to 54, taken from the guide Football 54)
- Roger Rabier, Allez SOM, Montpellier, 1985, pp. 251–253 (quote from Favre says that he joined Montpellier straight after Red Star, but all other sources state that he joined Béziers before his transfer)
- Coll., Football 55, Paris, L'Équipe, p. 137 (biography)
- Coll., Football 54, Paris, L'Équipe, p. 143 (composition of the Alès team in 53–54)
