= István Závodi =

Hungarian footballer

Personal information
- Full name: István Závodi-Zavadsky
- Date of birth: 27 July 1906
- Place of birth: Austria-Hungary
- Date of death: 10 November 1987 (aged 81)
- Place of death: Montpellier, France
- Position: Striker

Senior career*
Years	Team	Apps	(Gls)
- Újpest FC
1932–1939	SO Montpellier		
1939–1944	FC Sète		
1944–1945	SO Montpellier		
1945–1946	FC Antibes		
1946–1947	SO Montpellier		

International career
1932	Hungary	2	(1)

Managerial career
- 1951–1952: SO Montpellier
- 1954–1955: FC Sète
- 1956–1957: SO Montpellier
- * Club domestic league appearances and goals

István Závodi, often referred to as Istvan Zavadsky and nicknamed "Pista" (pronounced Pisht'uh; 27 July 1906 – 10 November 1987) was a Hungarian footballer, who capped twice for Hungary national football team.

He spent the majority of his career in France, with SO Montpellier, a team he coached later. During his time in Montpellier in the early 1930s he became close friends with the future leader of Albania, Enver Hoxha.
