= Laciné Megnan-Pavé =

French footballer (born 2010)

- Megnan-Pavé with Montpellier in 2026

Personal information
- Date of birth: 7 March 2010 (age 16)
- Place of birth: Montpellier, France
- Height: 1.87 m (6 ft 2 in)
- Position: Forward

Team information
- Current team: Montpellier
- Number: 9

Youth career
- 2015–2016: ES Paulhan
- 2016–: Montpellier

Senior career*
Years	Team	Apps	(Gls)
2026–	Montpellier	9	(4)

International career^{‡}
2025–2026	France U16	10	(5)
2026–	France U17	1	(0)
- * Club domestic league appearances and goals as of 31 October 2026 ‡ National team caps and goals as of 3 October 2026

Laciné Megnan-Pavé (born 7 March 2010) is a French professional footballer who plays as a forward for Ligue 2 club Montpellier.

== Club career ==
Born in the city of Montpellier, Megnan-Pavé joined Montpellier's academy aged six and was consistently played above his age group. On 2 February 2026, aged 15, he became the youngest player to sign a professional contract in the club's history, agreeing a deal to June 2028. He started the 2026 Coupe Gambardella final, in which he assisted Robin Thiland-Hérard's goal in Montpellier's 3–2 defeat to Paris Saint-Germain, and was substituted in the 90th minute. Having played the 2025–26 season with the under-19s, he simultaneously trained with the first team, becoming eligible to play professionally from 1 July 2026. In August 2026, he was linked with several European clubs, most notably including Paris Saint-Germain, who reportedly made a €10 million offer to Montpellier.

On 8 August 2026, Megnan-Pavé made his professional debut for Montpellier against Dijon, coming on in the 85th minute and opening the scoring five minutes later in a 1–1 draw. The goal was initially recorded as an own goal by Lenny Lacroix; the LFP competitions commission awarded it to Megnan-Pavé three days later, having determined that he touched the ball goalwards before Lacroix diverted it in. Aged 16 years and 154 days, he became Montpellier's youngest goalscorer, the third-youngest in Ligue 2 history behind Jocelyn Gourvennec and George Ilenikhena, and the first player born in 2010 to score in one of Europe's top five leagues or their second tiers.

== International career ==
Megnan-Pavé was born in France and is of Ivorian descent through his father, and holds dual French and Ivorian citizenship. He has captained the France under-16 national team.

== Career statistics ==
=== Club ===
As of match played 31 October 2026

Appearances and goals by club, season and competition
Club	Season	League			Cup		Europe		Other		Total	
Club	Season	Division	Apps	Goals	Apps	Goals	Apps	Goals	Apps	Goals	Apps	Goals
Montpellier	2026–27	Ligue 2	9	4	0	0	—		—		9	4
Career total			9	4	0	0	0	0	0	0	9	4

== Honours ==
Montpellier U18

- Coupe Gambardella runner-up: 2025–26
