= Enzo Tchato =

Footballer (born 2002)

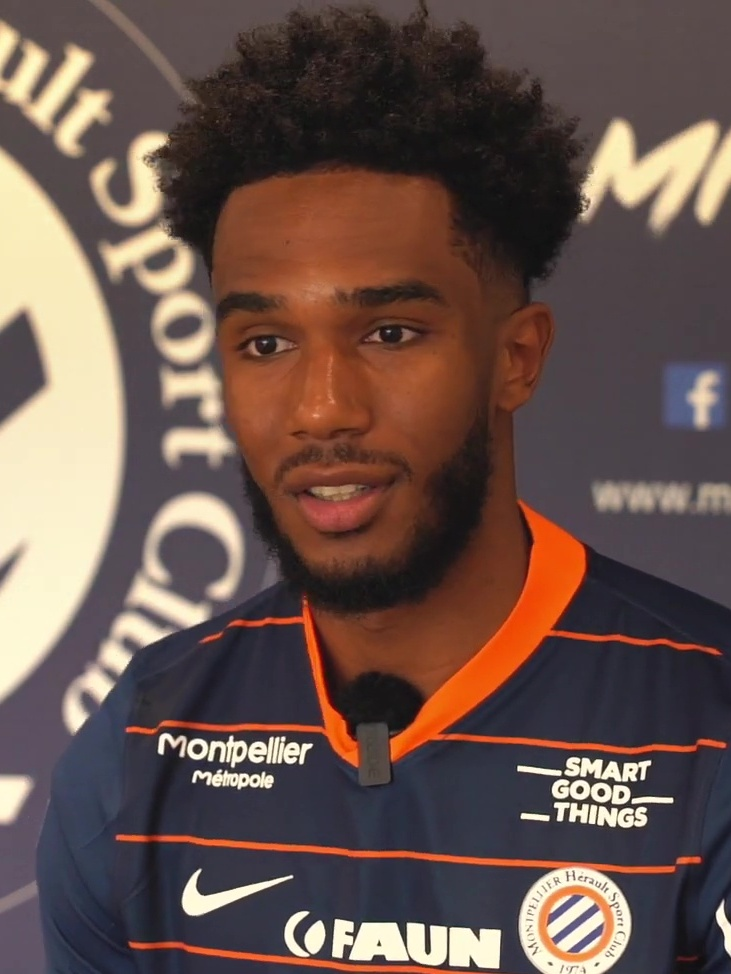
- Tchato in Montpellier in 2023

Personal information
- Full name: Enzo Gianni Tchato Mbiayi
- Date of birth: 23 November 2002 (age 23)
- Place of birth: Montpellier, France
- Height: 1.82 m (6 ft 0 in)
- Position: Defender

Team information
- Current team: Frosinone
- Number: 90

Youth career
- –2021: Montpellier

Senior career*
| Years | Team | Apps | (Gls) |
| 2019–2023 | Montpellier B | 34 | (1) |
| 2022–2026 | Montpellier | 97 | (1) |
| 2026– | Frosinone | 1 | (0) |

International career^{‡}
| 2021 | Cameroon U20 | 2 | (0) |
| 2022– | Cameroon | 5 | (0) |
- * Club domestic league appearances and goals as of 25 October 2026 ‡ National team caps and goals as of 27 January 2024

Enzo Gianni Tchato Mbiayi (born 23 November 2002) is a professional footballer who plays as a defender for Serie A club Frosinone. Born in France, he plays for the Cameroon national team.

== Club career ==
On 3 April 2022, Tchato made his professional debut for Montpellier as a substitute in a 2–1 Ligue 1 defeat at home to Brest. On 23 May, he signed his first professional contract with the club. His first league start came in a 3–2 home victory over Troyes on 7 August. On 13 August, Tchato scored his first professional goal in a 5–2 league defeat away to Paris Saint-Germain.

On 28 May 2024, it was announced that Tchato had signed a contract extension with Montpellier.

On 25 August 2026, Tchato moved to Italian club Frosinone, recently promoted to Serie A, on a four-season contract.

== International career ==
In January 2021, Tchato was called up to the Cameroon U20 national team for a training camp. In February, he participated in the 2021 Africa U-20 Cup of Nations in Mauritania, where his team reached the quarter-finals. At the tournament, Tchato was one of the "revelations" of the Cameroonian team.

On 11 June 2023, Tchato made his Cameroon debut in a 2–2 friendly draw against Mexico.

== Personal life ==
Tchato is French and Cameroonian by descent. His father Bill was a Cameroon international, and played for Montpellier as well.

== Career statistics ==
=== Club ===
As of match played 17 May 2025

Appearances and goals by club, season and competition
| Club | Season | League | | | Coupe de France | | Other | | Total | |
| Club | Season | Division | Apps | Goals | Apps | Goals | Apps | Goals | Apps | Goals |
|---|---|---|---|---|---|---|---|---|---|---|
| Montpellier B | 2019–20 | CFA 2 | 10 | 0 | — | | — | | 10 | 0 |
| Montpellier B | 2020–21 | CFA 2 | 3 | 1 | — | | — | | 3 | 1 |
| Montpellier B | 2021–22 | CFA 2 | 20 | 0 | — | | — | | 20 | 0 |
| Montpellier B | 2023–24 | CFA 2 | 1 | 0 | — | | — | | 1 | 0 |
| Montpellier B | Total | | 34 | 1 | — | | — | | 34 | 1 |
| Montpellier | 2021–22 | Ligue 1 | 1 | 0 | 0 | 0 | — | | 1 | 0 |
| Montpellier | 2022–23 | Ligue 1 | 21 | 1 | 1 | 0 | — | | 22 | 1 |
| Montpellier | 2023–24 | Ligue 1 | 17 | 0 | 0 | 0 | — | | 17 | 0 |
| Montpellier | 2024–25 | Ligue 1 | 27 | 0 | 0 | 0 | — | | 27 | 0 |
| Montpellier | Total | | 66 | 1 | 1 | 0 | — | | 67 | 1 |
| Career total | | | 100 | 2 | 1 | 0 | 0 | 0 | 101 | 2 |

=== International ===
As of matches played on 27 January 2024

Appearances and goals by national team and year
| National team | Year | Apps | Goals |
|---|---|---|---|
| Cameroon | 2023 | 1 | 0 |
| Cameroon | 2024 | 4 | 0 |
| Total | | 5 | 0 |
