= Rabby Nzingoula =

French footballer (born 2005)

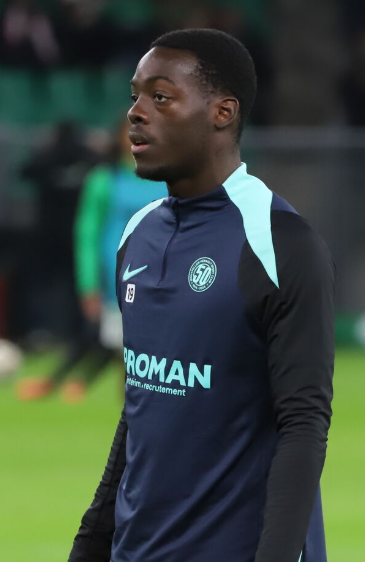
- Nzingoula with Montpellier in 2024

Personal information
- Full name: Rabby Alexandre Jason Nzingoula
- Date of birth: 25 November 2005 (age 20)
- Place of birth: Lille, France
- Height: 1.82 m (6 ft 0 in)
- Position: Defensive midfielder

Team information
- Current team: West Bromwich Albion
- Number: 20

Youth career
- 2011–2020: Grigny
- 2020–2022: Orléans
- 2022–2024: Strasbourg

Senior career*
Years	Team	Apps	(Gls)
2022–2024	Strasbourg B	24	(3)
2024–2026	Strasbourg	10	(0)
2024–2025	→ Montpellier (loan)	27	(1)
2026	→ 1. FC Nürnberg (loan)	15	(1)
2026–	West Bromwich Albion	11	(0)

International career^{‡}
2024–2025	France U20	16	(0)
- * Club domestic league appearances and goals as of 18 October 2026 ‡ National team caps and goals as of 23:30, 15 October 2025 (UTC)

Rabby Alexandre Jason Nzingoula (born 25 November 2005) is a French professional footballer who plays as a defensive midfielder for EFL Championship club West Bromwich Albion. He began his professional career with Strasbourg, and has also played for Montpellier and Nürnberg.

== Club career ==
Nzingoula grew up playing for Grigny in the Paris region. After a spell at Orléans, he joined the youth of academy of Strasbourg in 2022, at the age of 16. On 18 February 2024, Nzingoula made his professional and Ligue 1 debut in a 3–1 loss to Lorient. He signed his first professional contract with Strasbourg on 15 May 2024, a deal until 2027.

On 28 August 2024, Nzingoula signed for fellow Ligue 1 club Montpellier on a season-long loan. He made his debut as a substitute in a 3–1 defeat to Nantes.

On 27 January 2026, Nzingoula was loaned to 1. FC Nürnberg in Germany's 2. Bundesliga.

On 11 August 2026, Nzingoula signed for West Bromwich Albion on a three-year contract, for an undisclosed fee.

== International career ==
Nzingoula made his France U20 debut in a 1–1 friendly draw against Denmark on 16 November 2024.

He represented France at the 2025 FIFA U-20 World Cup, where France finished in fourth place.

== Personal life ==
Born in Lille, France, Nzingoula is of Congolese descent from the Republic of the Congo. His younger brother Rudy Matondo is also a professional footballer.

== Career statistics ==
As of match played 18 October 2026

Appearances and goals by club, season and competition
Club	Season	League			National cup (Note: Includes Coupe de France, FA Cup)		League cup (Note: Includes EFL Cup)		Europe		Total	
Club	Season	Division	Apps	Goals	Apps	Goals	Apps	Goals	Apps	Goals	Apps	Goals
Strasbourg B	2022–23	National 3	14	0	—		—		—		14	0
Strasbourg B	2023–24	National 3	10	3	—		—		—		10	3
Strasbourg B	Total		24	3	—		—		—		24	3
Strasbourg	2023–24	Ligue 1	6	0	1	0	—		—		7	0
Strasbourg	2025–26	Ligue 1	4	0	0	0	—		4 (Note: Appearances in UEFA Conference League)	0	8	0
Strasbourg	2026–27	Ligue 1	0	0	0	0	—		—		0	0
Strasbourg	Total		10	0	1	0	—		4	0	15	0
Montpellier (loan)	2024–25	Ligue 1	27	1	0	0	—		—		27	1
1. FC Nürnberg (loan)	2025–26	2. Bundesliga	15	1	—		—		—		15	1
West Bromwich Albion	2026–27	Championship	11	0	0	0	1	0	—		12	0
Career total			87	5	1	0	1	0	4	0	93	5

== Honours ==
France U20

- Maurice Revello Tournament: 2025
