= Tanguy Coulibaly =

French footballer (born 2001)

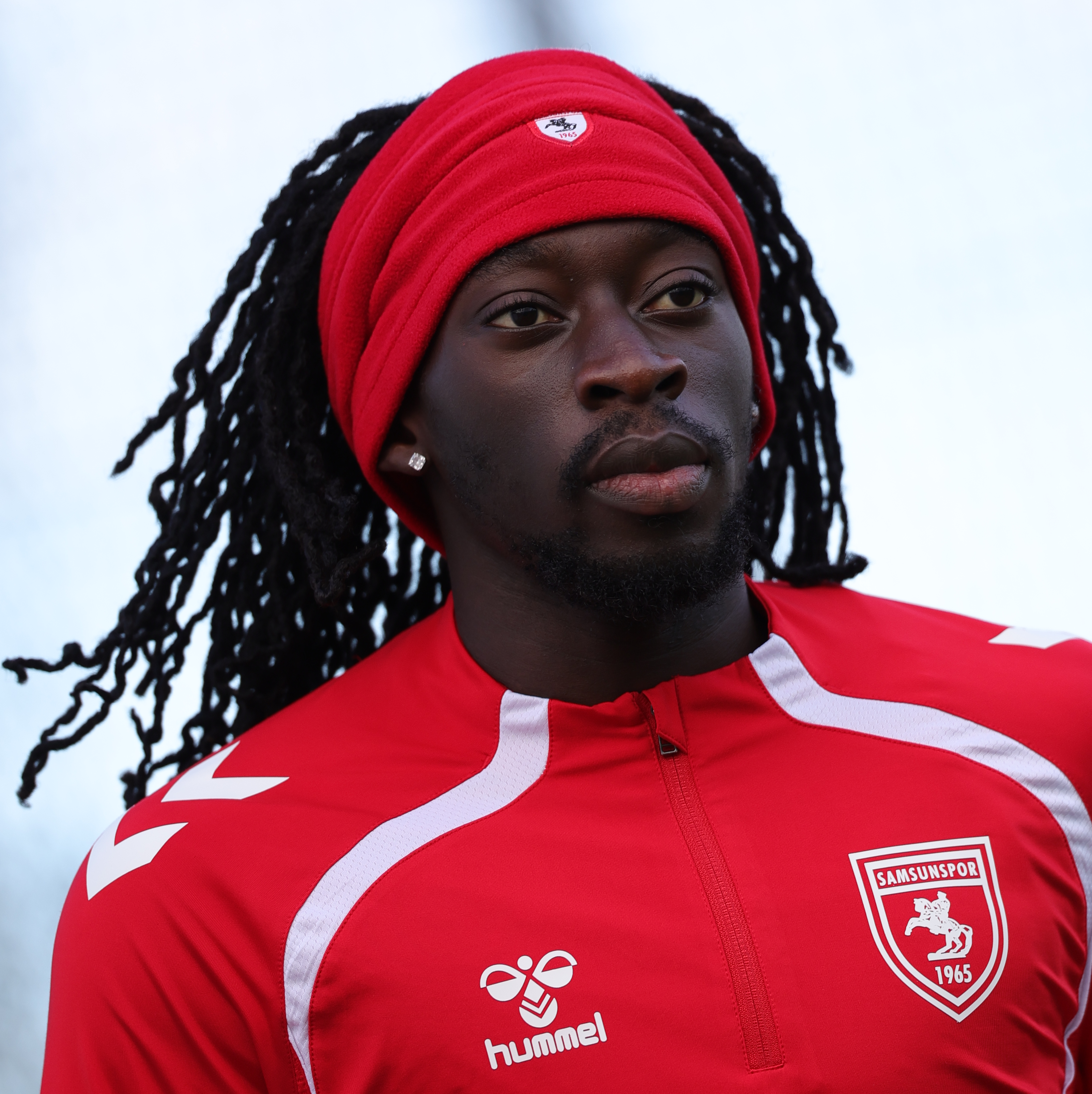
- Coulibaly with Samsunspor in 2025

Personal information
- Full name: Tanguy Bemin Coulibaly
- Date of birth: 18 February 2001 (age 25)
- Place of birth: Sèvres, France
- Height: 1.78 m (5 ft 10 in)
- Position: Winger

Team information
- Current team: Samsunspor
- Number: 10

Youth career
- 2013–2019: Paris Saint-Germain

Senior career*
Years	Team	Apps	(Gls)
2019–2020	VfB Stuttgart II	8	(0)
2019–2023	VfB Stuttgart	68	(6)
2023–2025	Montpellier	45	(5)
2025–	Samsunspor	13	(2)
- * Club domestic league appearances and goals as of 10 June 2026

Tanguy Bemin Coulibaly (born 18 February 2001) is a French professional footballer who plays as a winger for Turkish Süper Lig club Samsunspor.

== Club career ==
=== Paris Saint-Germain ===
Coulibaly is a product of the Paris Saint-Germain Youth Academy. During the 2018–19 season, he played for the U19 side of the club, grabbing one goal and two assists in seven UEFA Youth League appearances. He left Paris Saint-Germain in 2019, having not played any senior football in France.

=== VfB Stuttgart ===
On 2 July 2019, Coulibaly signed for VfB Stuttgart on a four-year contract. He made his debut in the 2. Bundesliga for the team on 20 October 2019 against Holstein Kiel.

Coulibaly's first goal for VfB Stuttgart came in a 3–1 home loss to Bayern Munich on 28 November 2020. On 12 December, he scored in a 5–1 away win against Borussia Dortmund at the Westfalenstadion.

=== Montpellier ===
On 4 December 2023, Coulibaly returned to France by joining Ligue 1 club Montpellier on a free transfer.

=== Samsunspor ===
On 2 September 2025, Coulibaly signed a three-year contract with Samsunspor in Turkey.

== International career ==
Coulibaly holds French, Ivorian and Malian nationalities. In 2019, Coulibaly was called up by the Mali U20 national team for the FIFA U-20 World Cup in Poland.

== Career statistics ==
As of match played 17 May 2025

Appearances and goals by club, season and competition
Club	Season	League			National cup		Other		Total	
Club	Season	Division	Apps	Goals	Apps	Goals	Apps	Goals	Apps	Goals
VfB Stuttgart II	2019–20	Oberliga	8	0	0	0	—		8	0
VfB Stuttgart	2019–20	2. Bundesliga	2	0	0	0	—		2	0
VfB Stuttgart	2020–21	Bundesliga	31	2	2	0	—		33	2
VfB Stuttgart	2021–22	Bundesliga	21	0	1	0	—		22	0
VfB Stuttgart	2022–23	Bundesliga	14	4	2	0	—		16	4
VfB Stuttgart	Total		68	6	5	0	—		73	6
Montpellier	2023–24	Ligue 1	16	1	2	0	—		18	1
Montpellier	2024–25	Ligue 1	25	3	1	0	—		26	3
Montpellier	Total		41	4	3	0	—		44	4
Career total			117	10	8	0	—		125	10
