= Joris Chotard =

French footballer (born 2001)

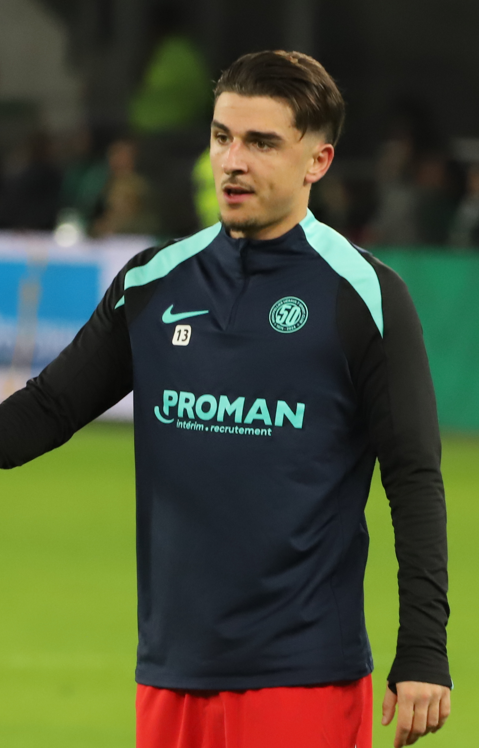
- Chotard with Montpellier in 2024

Personal information
- Full name: Joris Jean-Claude Jacques Chotard
- Date of birth: 24 September 2001 (age 25)
- Place of birth: Orange, Vaucluse, France
- Height: 1.79 m (5 ft 10 in)
- Position: Defensive midfielder

Team information
- Current team: Brest
- Number: 13

Youth career
- 2007–2009: RC de Provence
- 2009–2013: FA Chateaurenard
- 2013–2016: Le Pontet
- 2016–2018: Montpellier

Senior career*
Years	Team	Apps	(Gls)
2018–2019	Montpellier B	8	(0)
2019–2025	Montpellier	178	(2)
2025–	Brest	33	(2)

International career
2018–2019	France U18	7	(0)
2019	France U19	6	(0)
2021–2023	France U21	9	(0)
2024	France Olympic	9	(0)
Medal record
Men's football
Representing (France) France
Olympic Games
Silver medal – second place	2024 Paris	Team
- * Club domestic league appearances and goals as of 19 May 2026

Joris Jean-Claude Jacques Chotard (born 24 September 2001) is a French professional footballer who plays as a defensive midfielder for Ligue 1 club Brest.

== Club career ==
Born in Orange, Vaucluse, Chotard is a product of Montpellier's youth academy. He scored his first professional goal in a 2–1 Ligue 1 defeat to Clermont on 8 May 2022, a volley described as "extraordinary". On 29 June 2022, Chotard extended his contract with Montpellier.

On 23 August 2025, Chotard signed a four-season contract with Brest.

== Career statistics ==
As of match played 17 May 2025

Appearances, goals, and clean sheets by club, season, and competition
Club	Season	League			Cup		League cup		Other		Total	
Club	Season	Division	Apps	Goals	Apps	Goals	Apps	Goals	Apps	Goals	Apps	Goals
Montpellier B	2018–19	National 3	6	0	—		—		—		6	0
Montpellier B	2019–20	CFA 2	2	0	—		—		—		2	0
Montpellier B	Total		8	0	—		—		—		8	0
Montpellier	2019–20	Ligue 1	20	0	2	0	1	0	—		23	0
Montpellier	2020–21	Ligue 1	29	0	4	0	—		—		33	0
Montpellier	2021–22	Ligue 1	36	1	2	0	—		—		38	0
Montpellier	2022–23	Ligue 1	35	0	1	0	—		—		36	0
Montpellier	2023–24	Ligue 1	31	0	1	0	—		—		32	0
Montpellier	2024–25	Ligue 1	26	1	1	0	—		—		27	1
Montpellier	Total		177	2	11	0	1	0	0	0	189	2
Career total			185	2	11	0	1	0	0	0	197	2

== Honours ==
France Olympic

- Summer Olympics silver medal: 2024

Orders

- Knight of the National Order of Merit: 2024
