= 1960–61 French Division 2 =

22nd season of the second-tier football league in France

Division 2
- Season: 1960–61

Statistics of Division 2 in the 1960–61 season.

== Overview ==
It was contested by 19 teams, and Montpellier won the championship.

== League standings ==
Pos	Team	Pld	W	D	L	GF	GA	GD	Pts	Promotion or relegation
1	Montpellier	36	22	4	10	68	35	+33	48	Promoted
2	FC Metz	36	19	10	7	69	37	+32	48	Promoted
3	Sochaux-Montbéliard	36	18	10	8	58	36	+22	46	Promoted
4	RC Strasbourg	36	19	7	10	70	38	+32	45	Promoted
5	Béziers	36	13	16	7	54	52	+2	42	
6	Olympique Marseille	36	15	11	10	56	42	+14	41	
7	Cannes	36	17	7	12	71	59	+12	41	
8	Girondins Bordeaux	36	14	13	9	61	50	+11	41	
9	Lille	36	14	12	10	49	43	+6	40	
10	US Boulogne	36	18	3	15	63	62	+1	39	
11	Nantes	36	15	6	15	61	64	−3	36	
12	Roubaix-Tourcoing	36	13	7	16	59	63	−4	33	
13	Cherbourg	36	10	9	17	45	58	−13	29	
14	Toulon	36	10	9	17	36	59	−23	29	
15	Forbach	36	10	7	19	51	68	−17	27	
16	Olympique Alès	36	10	7	19	39	62	−23	27	Relegated
17	Besançon	36	8	9	19	50	79	−29	25	
18	CA Paris	36	9	7	20	33	56	−23	25	
19	Aix-en-Provence	36	7	8	21	37	65	−28	22	

Source: rsssf.com
