= Jean-Louis Gasset =

French football manager (1953–2025)

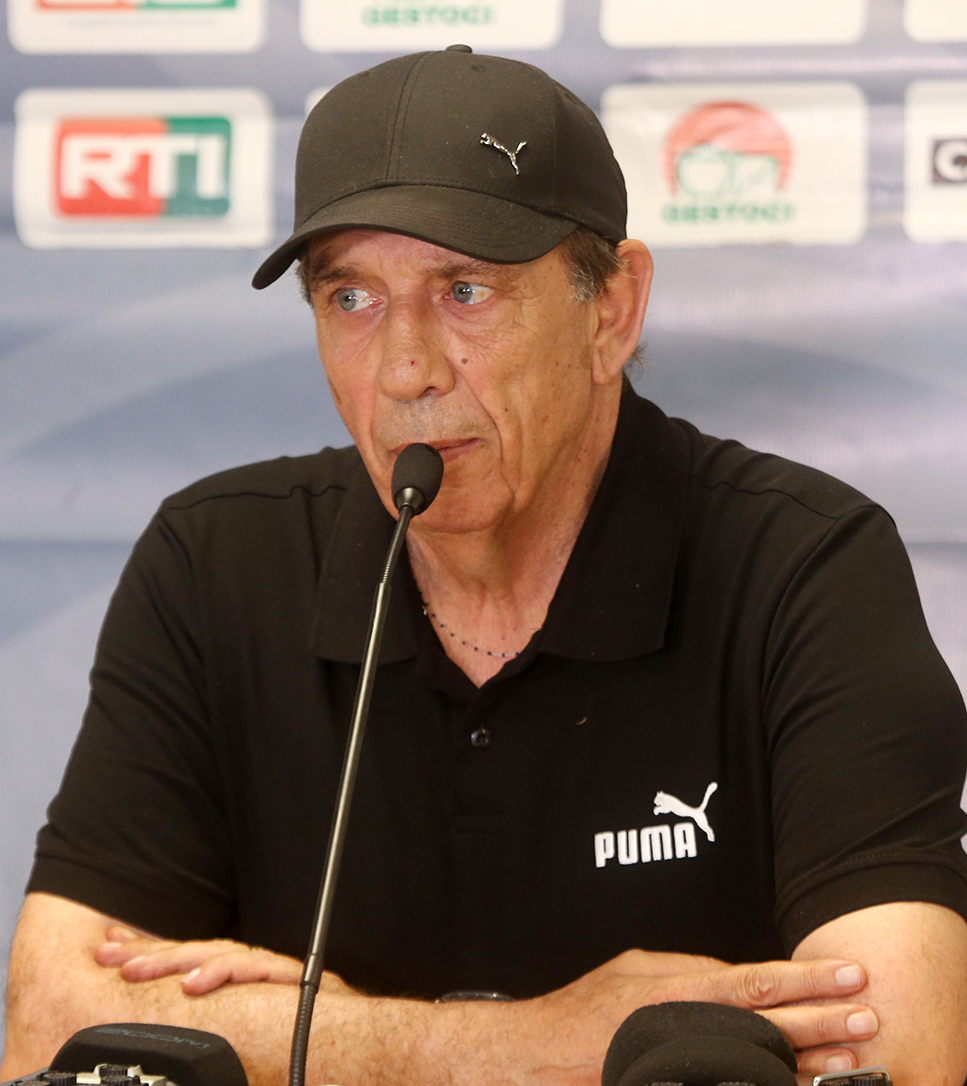
- Gasset as manager of Ivory Coast in 2023

Personal information
- Date of birth: 9 December 1953
- Place of birth: Montpellier, France
- Date of death: 26 December 2025 (aged 72)
- Place of death: Montpellier, France
- Height: 1.76 m (5 ft 9 in)
- Position: Midfielder

Youth career
- 1969–1974: Béziers

Senior career*
Years	Team	Apps	(Gls)
1974–1975	Béziers	4	(0)
1975–1985	Montpellier	231	(10)
Total		235	(10)

Managerial career
- 1998–1999: Montpellier
- 2000–2001: Caen
- 2005–2006: Istres
- 2017: Montpellier
- 2017–2019: Saint-Étienne
- 2020–2021: Bordeaux
- 2022–2024: Ivory Coast
- 2024: Marseille
- 2024–2025: Montpellier
- * Club domestic league appearances and goals

Jean-Louis Gasset (9 December 1953 – 26 December 2025) was a French professional football manager and player. As a player, he played as a midfielder, spending ten years at his hometown club Montpellier.

== Career ==
Born in Montpellier, Gasset played ten years at his hometown club Montpellier.

He led Montpellier to victory in the UEFA Intertoto Cup in 1999. He then coached Caen and Istres. He was assistant to Luis Fernández at Paris Saint-Germain and Spain's Espanyol.

Gasset was the main assistant of Laurent Blanc as manager of Bordeaux, the France national team and PSG from 2007 to 2016, notably conducting the training sessions.

He had the top job at Montpellier again for the second half of the 2016–17 season, finishing 15th. He then became Óscar García's right-hand man at Saint-Étienne, and succeeded the Spaniard in December 2017, just an hour before a 2–1 loss at Guingamp.

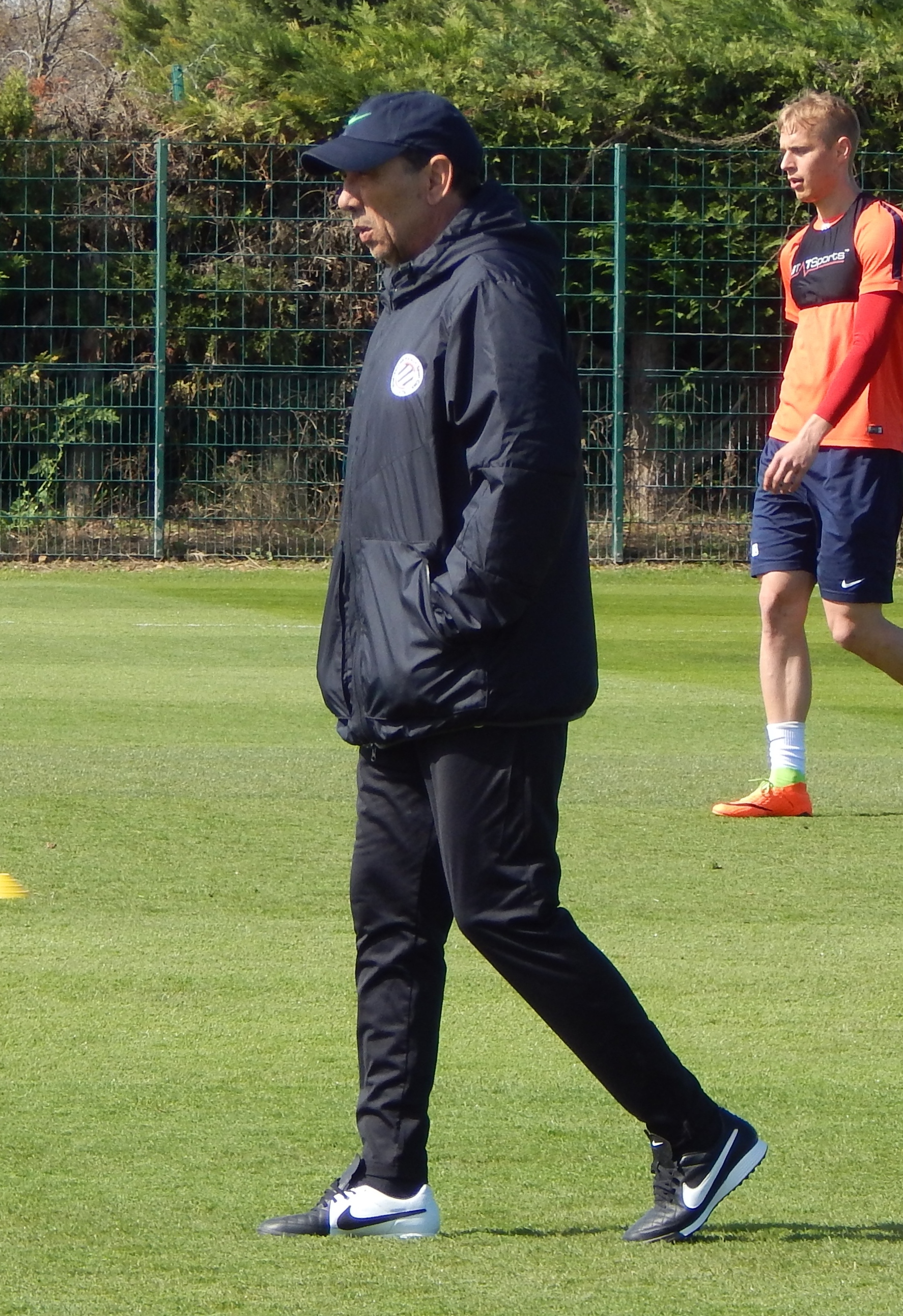
Gasset as manager of Montpellier in 2017

In June 2018, having turned Saint-Étienne's season around to finish sixth, missing out on the UEFA Europa League on goal difference to Bordeaux, Gasset was given another year in the job. A year later, having come fourth and secured a place in that European competition, he resigned due to disputes with the board over transfer budgets.

Gasset was hired by Bordeaux on 12 August 2020, after Paulo Sousa's exit. On 27 July 2021 he left the club.

On 20 May 2022, Gasset was appointed coach of Ivory Coast, succeeding Patrice Beaumelle, whose contract expired on 6 April 2022. He handed his resignation on 24 January 2024, following a poor performance at the group stages of the 2023 Africa Cup of Nations on home soil. Emerse Faé then led the team to the title.

On 20 February 2024, Gasset became the head coach of Marseille, following the dismissal of Gennaro Gattuso.

On 7 April 2025, Gasset left Montpellier by mutual consent as the club sat last in Ligue 1.

== Death ==
Gasset died on 26 December 2025, at the age of 72.

== Managerial statistics ==
Managerial record by team and tenure
Team	From	To	Record				
Team	From	To	G	W	D	L	Win %
Montpellier	1 July 1998	30 November 1999	68	24	17	27	35.29
Caen	1 September 2000	30 June 2001	34	12	8	14	35.29
Istres	17 January 2005	16 September 2006	49	15	14	20	30.61
Montpellier	30 January 2017	23 May 2017	16	5	1	10	31.25
Saint-Étienne	20 December 2017	30 June 2019	62	31	14	17	50.00
Bordeaux	10 August 2020	27 July 2021	39	13	6	20	33.33
Ivory Coast	20 May 2022	24 January 2024	18	11	3	4	61.11
Marseille	20 February 2024	19 May 2024	19	9	3	7	47.37
Montpellier	22 October 2024	7 April 2025	20	3	2	15	15.00
Total			330	124	70	136	37.58

== Honours ==
=== Player ===
Montpellier

- Division 2: 1980–81
- Ligue de la Méditerranée: 1975–76

=== Coach ===
Montpellier

- UEFA Intertoto Cup: 1999
