= Montpellier HSC =

French football club

Montpellier
- Full name: Montpellier Hérault Sport Club
- Nickname: La Paillade
- Short name: MHSC
- Founded: 1974; 52 years ago
- Ground: Stade de la Mosson
- Capacity: 33,556
- Owner: Groupe Nicollin
- President: Laurent Nicollin
- Head coach: Zoumana Camara
- League: Ligue 2
- 2025–26: Ligue 2, 8th of 18
- Website: mhscfoot.com
Home colours	Away colours	Third colours

Montpellier Hérault Sport Club (French: [mɔ̃pəlje eʁo spɔʁ klœb]; Occitan: Montpelhièr Erau Sport Club), commonly referred to as Montpellier HSC, is a French professional football club based in Montpellier, Occitanie, France. The club's origins date back to 1919, but it was officially founded in 1974 through a merger of both Stade Olympique Montpelliérain and AS Paillade.

The club currently competes in Ligue 2, the second level of French football. They play their home matches at the Stade de la Mosson, located within the city. The first team is managed by Zoumana Camara.

Montpellier is owned by Laurent Nicollin, the son of Louis Nicollin, a French entrepreneur, who had been owner since 1974. The club have produced several famous players in its history, most notably Laurent Blanc, who has served as manager of the France national team. Blanc is also the club's all-time leading goalscorer. Eric Cantona, Roger Milla, Carlos Valderrama and Olivier Giroud are other players who have played in Montpellier's colours. In 2001, Montpellier introduced a women's team.

== History ==
=== Origins (1919–1974) ===
Montpellier was founded in 1919 as Stade Olympique Montpelliérain and soon went on to win the Coupe de France in 1929 in a 2–0 victory over FC Sète. SO Montpelliérain was one of twenty clubs to have played in the inaugural 1932–33 Division 1 season, the first season of professional top flight football in France. In 1974, SO Montpelliérain merged with AS Paillade to form the current iteration of the club, Montpellier Hérault Sport Club.

=== Continued success & promotions and relegations (1974–2011) ===
Many decades later, Montpellier went on to win their second Coupe de France in 1990 in a 2–1 victory over RC Paris. The club went on to win the Coupe de la Ligue in 1992 in a 3–1 victory over Angers. The club ended the decade winning the UEFA Intertoto Cup in 1999. Montpellier was relegated to Division 2, as it was known as at the time, at the end of the 1999–2000 season finishing in last place on 31 points. They were promoted the following season, returning to Division 1 for the 2001–02 season. The club was again relegated to Ligue 2 at the end of the 2003–04 season and went on to spend five consecutive seasons in Ligue 2 before being promoted back to Ligue 1 for the 2009–10 season where they finished in 5th place.

=== Title winners & eventual relegation (2011–present) ===
At the end of the 2011–12 season, Montpellier won its first Ligue 1 title, finishing the season with 82 points, three points ahead of runners-up Paris Saint-Germain. The league-winning match took place on 20 May 2012, in a game marred by stoppages for crowd violence which saw John Utaka score a brace to secure a 2–1 victory over Auxerre. Olivier Giroud, who finished the season with 21 goals and 9 assists, was the league's top goal scorer. Despite being tied on goals with Paris Saint-Germain attacker Nenê, he was named the league's top scorer by the Ligue de Football Professionnel due to finishing with more goals in open play.

On 26 April 2025, after 16 consecutive seasons in Ligue 1, Montpellier was relegated to Ligue 2.

== Players ==
=== Current squad ===
As of 7 September 2026

Note: Flags indicate national team as defined under FIFA eligibility rules; some limited exceptions apply. Players may hold more than one non-FIFA nationality.

No.	Pos.	Nation	Player
1	GK	FRA	Mathieu Michel
3	DF	MAR	Naoufel El Hannach (on loan from PSG)
5	MF	FRA	Florian Tardieu
6	DF	FRA	Yaël Mouanga
9	FW	FRA	Laciné Megnan-Pavé
10	FW	FRA	Yassine Benhattab
11	FW	MLI	Mamadou Camara
12	DF	CMR	Oscar Etoundi
15	DF	FRA	Julien Laporte
17	DF	FRA	Théo Sainte-Luce
18	FW	FRA	Nicolas Pays
19	FW	FRA	Nordan Mukiele (on loan from Rennes)
20	MF	FRA	Nabil Homssa
22	FW	FRA	Axel Gueguin

No.	Pos.	Nation	Player
23	FW	ALG	Daryll Benlahlou (on loan from Lyon)
25	DF	CMR	Wilfried Ndollo Bille
26	MF	CMR	Yvan Djemba Mbappé
27	DF	FRA	Daylam Meddah
28	DF	FRA	Yanis Zouaoui
31	GK	CMR	Simon Ngapandouetnbu
39	FW	FRA	Jérémy Hatchi (on loan from Lorient)
44	MF	FRA	Théo Chennahi
50	GK	SRB	Viktor Džodić
58	DF	FRA	Alpha Sissoko
60	GK	CMR	Kevin Kamdem
77	MF	FRA	Everson Junior
90	MF	FRA	Grégory Ayem

=== Out on loan ===
Note: Flags indicate national team as defined under FIFA eligibility rules; some limited exceptions apply. Players may hold more than one non-FIFA nationality.

No.	Pos.	Nation	Player
—	FW	UAE	Junior Ndiaye (at Valenciennes until 30 June 2027)

== Records ==
=== Most appearances ===
Rank	Player	Matches
1	(Senegal) Souleymane Camara	433
2	(France) Pascal Baills	429
3	(France) Bruno Carotti	377
4	(Brazil) Vitorino Hilton	354
5	(Algeria) Kader Ferhaoui	349

=== Top scorers ===
Rank	Player	Goals
1	(France) Laurent Blanc	84
2	(Senegal) Souleymane Camara	76
3	(France) Jean-Marc Valadier	70
4	(France) Christophe Sanchez	50
5	(Algeria) Andy Delort	49

== Management and staff ==
=== Club officials ===
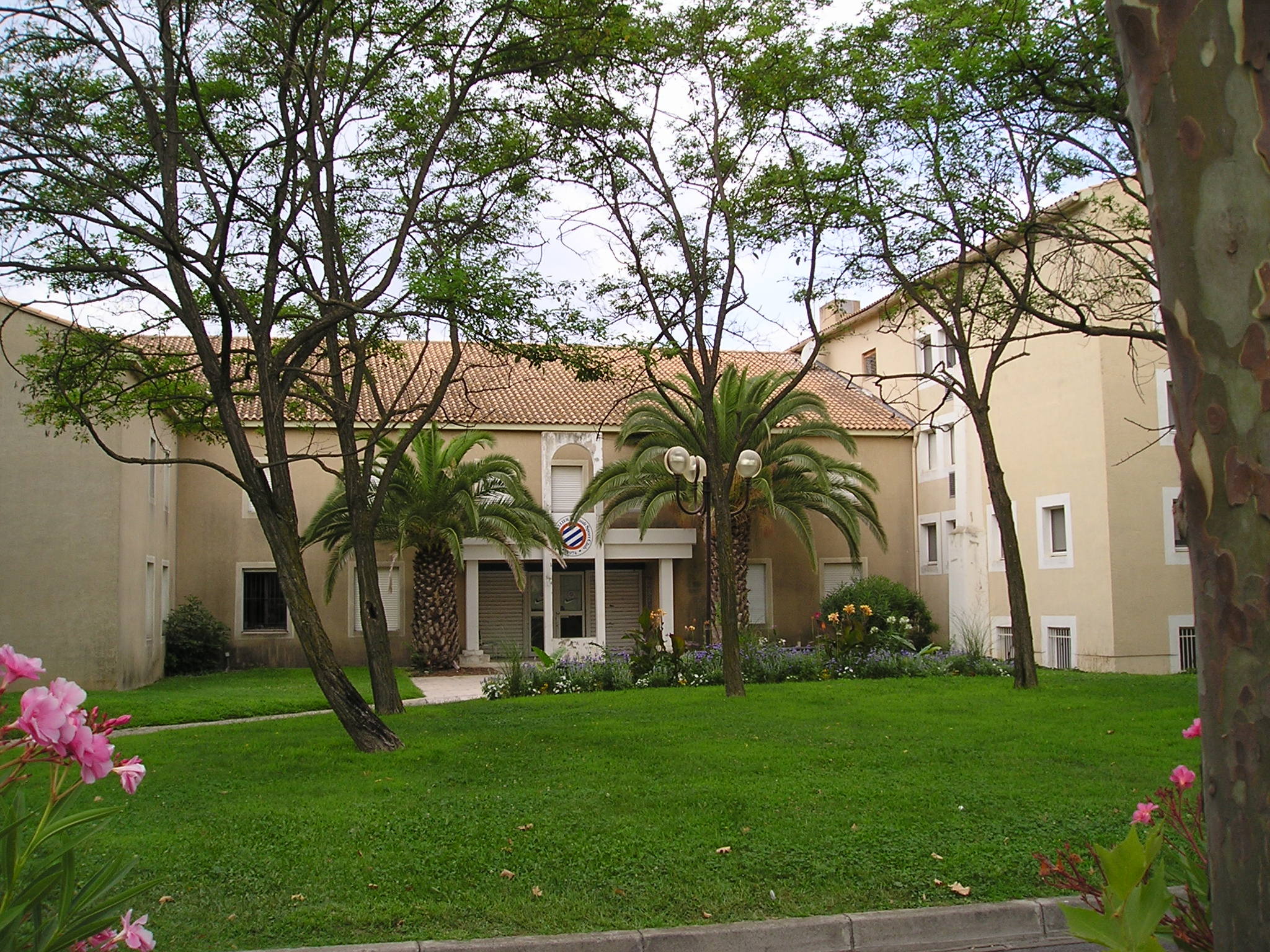
Montpellier HSC headquarters

Senior club staff

- President: Laurent Nicollin
- Association chairman: Gilbert Varlot
- Sporting Director: Bruno Carotti
- Head of Youth: Francis De Taddeo

Coaching and medical staff

- Head coach: Zoumana Camara
- Assistant head coach: Ghislain Printant
- First-Team coach: Hilton
- Goalkeeper coach: Robin Gasset
- Fitness coach: Claude Duvergne
- Scout: Adrien Bordeau

=== Coaching history ===
Tenure	Manager
1924–1925	Victor Gibson
1936–1937	Jules Dewaquez
1937–1938	Istvan Berecz
1938–1939	Georges Azema
1945–1946	Gabriel Bénézech
1946–1948	Georges Kramer
1948–1950	Georges Winckelmans
1950–1951	Jean Bastien
1951–1952	Istvan Zavadsky
1952–1953	Luis Cazarro
1953–1954	Julien Darui
1954–1956	Marcel Tomazover
1956–1958	Istvan Zavadsky
1958–1963	Hervé Mirouze
1963–1968	Louis Favre
1968–1969	Roger Rolhion
1969–1970	Marian Borowski
1970–1974	Hervé Mirouze
1974–1976	André Cristol
1976	Louis Favre
1 July 1976 – 30 June 1980	Robert Nouzaret
1 July 1980 – 30 June 1982	Kader Firoud
1982–1984	Jacques Bonnet
1 July 1983 – 30 June 1985	Robert Nouzaret
1 July 1985 – 30 June 1987	Michel Mézy

Tenure	Manager
1 July 1987 – 30 June 1989	Pierre Mosca
1989–1990	Aimé Jacquet
12 February 1990 – 30 June 1990	Michel Mézy
1990–1992	Henryk Kasperczak
1992–1994	Gérard Gili
1 November 1994 – 30 June 1998	Michel Mézy
1 July 1998 – 30 November 1999	Jean-Louis Gasset
30 November 1999 – 1 November 2002	Michel Mézy
1 November 2002 – 10 February 2004	Gérard Bernardet
10 February 2004 – 29 August 2004	Robert Nouzaret
29 August 2004 – 24 April 2007	Jean-François Domergue
29 April 2007 – 30 June 2009	Rolland Courbis
1 July 2009 – 30 June 2013	René Girard
1 July 2013 – 5 December 2013	Jean Fernandez
9 December 2013– 25 December 2015	Rolland Courbis
27 December 2015 – 26 January 2016	Pascal Baills; Bruno Martini
26 January 2016 – 30 January 2017	Frédéric Hantz
30 January 2017 – 23 May 2017	Jean-Louis Gasset
23 May 2017 – 24 May 2021	Michel Der Zakarian
1 June 2021 – 17 October 2022	Olivier Dall'Oglio
14 November 2022 – 7 February 2023	Romain Pitau
8 February 2023 – 20 October 2024	Michel Der Zakarian
22 October 2024 – 7 April 2025	Jean-Louis Gasset
8 April 2025 – present	Zoumana Camara

== Honours ==
=== Domestic ===
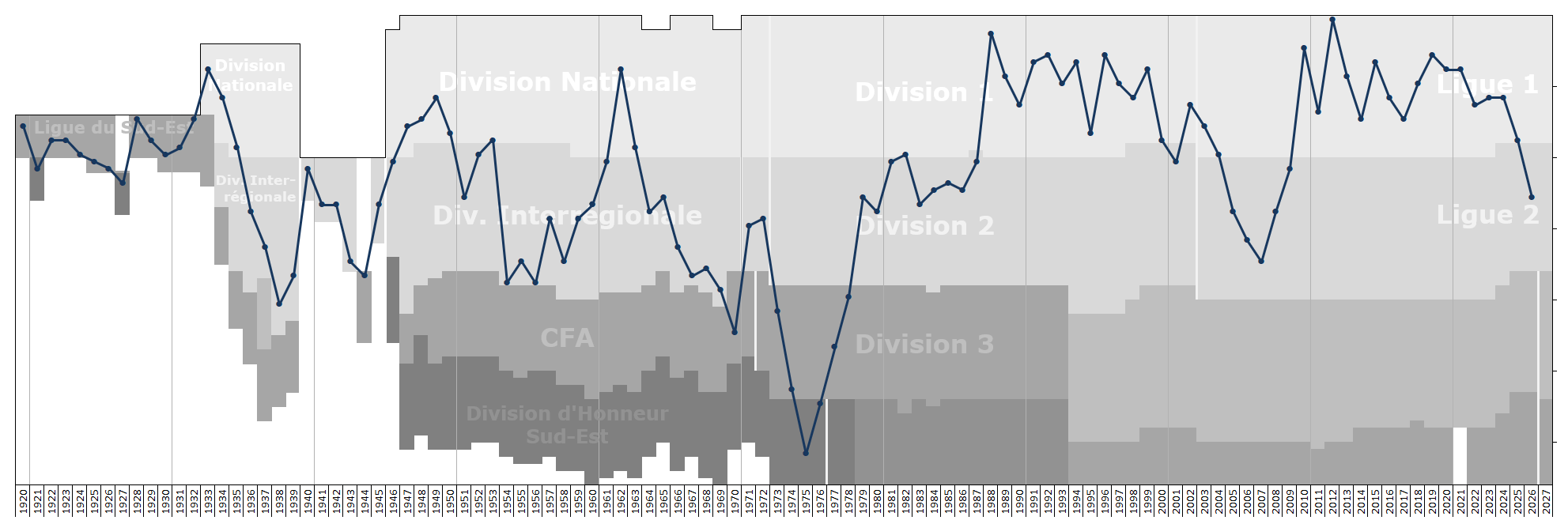
Historical league performance chart of Montpellier HSC

- Ligue 1
  - Champions (1): 2011–12
- Ligue 2
  - Champions (3): 1945–46, 1960–61, 1986–87
- Coupe de France
  - Champions (2): 1928–29, 1989–90
  - Runners-up (2): 1930–31, 1993–94
- Coupe de la Ligue
  - Champions (1): 1992
  - Runners-up (2): 1994, 2010–11
- Division d'Honneur (Languedoc-Roussillon)
  - Champions (2): 1981, 1992

=== Europe ===
- UEFA Intertoto Cup
  - Winners (1): 1999

=== Other ===
- Division d'Honneur (Sud-Est)
  - Champions (3): 1928, 1932, 1976

=== U19 ===
- Coupe Gambardella
  - Champions (3): 1996, 2009, 2017
  - Runners-up (3): 1984, 1985, 1997

== See also ==
- Montpellier HSC (women)
