= 2009–10 AS Monaco FC season =

AS Monaco
2009-10 season
- President: Étienne Franzi
- Head coach: Guy Lacombe
- Stadium: Stade Louis II
- Ligue 1: 8th
- Coupe de France: Runners-up vs Paris Saint-Germain
- Coupe de la Ligue: Third round vs Nancy
- Top goalscorer: League: Nenê (14 goals); All: Nenê (15 goals)
Home colours	Away colours	Third colours

The 2009–10 season was AS Monaco FC's 53rd season in Ligue 1. Guy Lacombe was the club's coach, guiding them to 8th in the league, the Third Round of the Coupe de la Ligue and the Final of the Coupe de France where they lost to Paris Saint-Germain.

== Squad ==
Note: Flags indicate national team as defined under FIFA eligibility rules; some limited exceptions apply. Players may hold more than one non-FIFA nationality.

No.	Pos.	Nation	Player
1	GK	FRA	Yohann Thuram-Ulien
2	DF	COD	Cédric Mongongu (Note: Mongongu was born in Kinshasa, Zaire, now Democratic Republic of the Congo.)
3	DF	CMR	Nicolas N'Koulou
4	DF	FRA	François Modesto
5	MF	URU	Diego Pérez
6	MF	BRA	Eduardo Costa
7	MF	CIV	Jean-Jacques Gosso
8	MF	ARG	Alejandro Alonso
10	FW	KOR	Park Chu-Young
11	FW	BRA	Nenê
12	DF	BRA	Adriano
13	DF	FRA	Vincent Muratori
15	MF	FRA	Thomas Mangani

No.	Pos.	Nation	Player
16	GK	FRA	Stéphane Ruffier
18	DF	MLI	Djimi Traoré
20	FW	COL	Juan Pablo Pino
22	MF	FRA	Mathieu Coutadeur
23	MF	CRO	Jerko Leko
24	FW	CIV	Yannick Sagbo (Note: Sagbo was born in Marseille, France.)
25	MF	NGR	Lukman Haruna
26	FW	FRA	Yohan Mollo
27	FW	FRA	Frédéric Nimani
28	DF	FRA	Sébastien Puygrenier (loan from Zenit St.Petersburg)
29	MF	FRA	Distel Zola
31	FW	NIG	Moussa Maâzou (loan from CSKA Moscow)
32	DF	CIV	Igor Lolo

=== Out on loan ===
Note: Flags indicate national team as defined under FIFA eligibility rules; some limited exceptions apply. Players may hold more than one non-FIFA nationality.

No.	Pos.	Nation	Player
9	FW	ISL	Eiður Guðjohnsen (at Tottenham Hotspur)
17	FW	TOG	Serge Gakpé (at Tours)

No.	Pos.	Nation	Player
—	DF	SEN	Massamba Sambou (at Nantes)
—	MF	FRA	Kévin Diaz (at Ajaccio)

== Transfers ==
=== Summer ===
In: Note: Flags indicate national team as defined under FIFA eligibility rules; some limited exceptions apply. Players may hold more than one non-FIFA nationality.

No.	Pos.	Nation	Player
6	MF	BRA	Eduardo Costa (from (Brazil) São Paulo)
9	FW	ISL	Eiður Guðjohnsen (from (Spain) Barcelona)
18	DF	MLI	Djimi Traoré (from (England) Portsmouth)
22	MF	FRA	Mathieu Coutadeur (from (France) Le Mans)
28	DF	FRA	Sébastien Puygrenier (loan from (Russia) Zenit St.Petersburg)

Out: Note: Flags indicate national team as defined under FIFA eligibility rules; some limited exceptions apply. Players may hold more than one non-FIFA nationality.

No.	Pos.	Nation	Player
6	MF	CRO	Nikola Pokrivač (to (Austria) Red Bull Salzburg)
8	DF	SUI	Patrick Müller (Retired)
11	FW	USA	Freddy Adu (loan return to (Portugal) Benfica)
21	MF	FRA	Camel Meriem
24	MF	FRA	Loïc Dufau (loan to (France) Cassis Carnoux)
27	FW	FRA	Alexandre Licata (to (France) Auxerre)
28	FW	FRA	Djamel Bakar (to (France) Nancy)
30	GK	ITA	Flavio Roma (to (Italy) A.C. Milan)
31	MF	FRA	Kévin Diaz (loan to (France) Ajaccio)
—	DF	SEN	Massamba Sambou (loan to (France) Nantes)

=== Winter ===
In: Note: Flags indicate national team as defined under FIFA eligibility rules; some limited exceptions apply. Players may hold more than one non-FIFA nationality.

No.	Pos.	Nation	Player
31	FW	NIG	Moussa Maâzou (loan from (Russia) CSKA Moscow)

Out: Note: Flags indicate national team as defined under FIFA eligibility rules; some limited exceptions apply. Players may hold more than one non-FIFA nationality.

No.	Pos.	Nation	Player
9	FW	ISL	Eiður Guðjohnsen (loan to (England) Tottenham Hotspur)
17	FW	TOG	Serge Gakpé (loan to (France) Tours)
27	FW	FRA	Frédéric Nimani (loan to (England) Burnley)

== Competitions ==
=== Ligue 1 ===
==== League table ====
Pos	Team	Pld	W	D	L	GF	GA	GD	Pts
6	Bordeaux	38	19	7	12	58	40	+18	64
7	Lorient	38	16	10	12	54	42	+12	58
8	Monaco	38	15	10	13	39	45	−6	55
9	Rennes	38	14	11	13	52	41	+11	53
10	Valenciennes	38	14	10	14	50	50	0	52

Source: Ligue 1
Rules for classification: 1) points; 2) goal difference; 3) number of goals scored.

==== Results summary ====
Overall								Home						Away					
Pld	W	D	L	GF	GA	GD	Pts	W	D	L	GF	GA	GD	W	D	L	GF	GA	GD
38	15	10	13	39	45	−6	55	11	5	3	26	14	+12	4	5	10	13	31	−18

Last updated: 31 March 2015.
Source: Soccerway

==== Results by round ====
Round	1	2	3	4	5	6	7	8	9	10	11	12	13	14	15	16	17	18	19	20	21	22	23	24	25	26	27	28	29	30	31	32	33	34	35	36	37	38
Ground	H	A	H	A	H	A	H	A	H	A	H	A	H	A	H	A	H	H	A	H	A	H	A	H	A	H	A	H	A	H	A	H	A	A	H	A	H	A
Result	W	L	W	L	W	W	L	W	W	W	W	L	D	L	W	L	L	D	D	W	W	W	L	L	L	W	L	D	D	D	D	W	L	L	D	D	W	D
Position	8	13	8	12	7	5	7	4	4	2	2	4	4	5	4	4	6	7	7	6	6	6	6	7	7	7	7	9	8	9	10	9	9	9	9	9	8	8

Source: Ligue 1
A = Away; H = Home; W = Win; D = Draw; L = Loss

==== Results ====
8 August 2009 1	AS Monaco	1-0	Toulouse	Monaco
21:00 CEST (UTC+2)	Pérez (yellow card) 41' (red card) 75'; Nenê 45'; Mongongu (yellow card) 67'; Muratori (yellow card) 74'	Report	Cetto (yellow card) 35'; Capoue (yellow card) 79'; Fofana (yellow card) 90'	Stadium: Stade Louis II; Attendance: 11,260; Referee: Stéphane Bré

15 August 2009 2	Nancy	4–0	AS Monaco	Nantes
19:00 CEST (UTC+2)	Dia 31'; André Luiz 42' (pen.); Alo'o 50', 80'; Lotiès (yellow card) 79'	Report	N'Koulou (yellow card) 40'; Nenê (yellow card) 83'	Stadium: Stade de la Beaujoire; Attendance: 27,042; Referee: Antony Gautier

22 August 2009 3	AS Monaco	2–0	Lorient	Monaco
19:00 CEST (UTC+2)	Nimani 22'; Nenê 33'; Traoré (yellow card) 83'; Sagbo (yellow card) 86'; Haruna (yellow card) 90'	Report	Peñalba (yellow card) 24'; Amalfitano (yellow card) 90'	Stadium: Stade Louis II; Attendance: 8,016; Referee: Sébastien Moreira

29 August 2009 4	Sochaux	1–0	AS Monaco	Montbéliard
19:00 CEST (UTC+2)	Svěrkoš 20' (pen.); Dalmat (yellow card) 78'	Report	Pérez (yellow card) 49'; Puygrenier (yellow card) 67'; Eduardo (yellow card) 83'	Stadium: Stade Auguste Bonal; Attendance: 13,141; Referee: Lionel Jaffredo

13 September 2009 5	AS Monaco	2-0	Paris Saint-Germain	Monaco
21:00 CEST (UTC+2)	Park 85'; Nenê 88'; Alonso (yellow card) 88'; Adriano (yellow card) 90'	Report	Bourillon (yellow card) 55'; Sessègnon (yellow card) 65' (red card) 90'	Stadium: Stade Louis II; Attendance: 10,459; Referee: Laurent Duhamel

19 September 2009 6	Nice	1-3	AS Monaco	Nice
19:00 CEST (UTC+2)	Faé (yellow card) 34'; Rémy 42'; Paisley (yellow card) 70'	Report	Nenê 8'; Alonso 12', 71'; Puygrenier (yellow card) 45+1'; Adriano (yellow card) 73'	Stadium: Stade du Ray; Attendance: 8,430; Referee: Stéphane Lannoy

26 September 2009 7	AS Monaco	1-2	Saint-Étienne	Monaco
19:00 CEST (UTC+2)	Puygrenier 56'; Traoré (yellow card) 66'; Alonso (yellow card) 82'	Report	Sanogo 3'; Sall (yellow card) 16'; Bergessio 90+2'	Stadium: Stade Louis II; Attendance: 8,490; Referee: Pascal Viléo

4 October 2009 8	Marseille	1-2	AS Monaco	Marseille
21:00 CEST (UTC+2)	Taiwo (yellow card) 16'; Kaboré (yellow card) 45+5'; Niang 85'	Report	Pérez (yellow card) 12'; Nenê 20'; Alonso (yellow card) 35'; Park 42'; Traoré (yellow card) 73'	Stadium: Stade Vélodrome; Attendance: 48,566; Referee: Stéphane Bré

18 October 2009 9	AS Monaco	2-0	Lens	Monaco
17:00 CEST (UTC+2)	Nenê 9', 67' (pen.); Gosso (yellow card) 45+1'; Adriano (yellow card) 60'; Haruna (yellow card) 78'	Report	Sow (yellow card) 34'	Stadium: Stade Louis II; Attendance: 7,603; Referee: Clément Turpin

24 October 2009 10	Boulogne	1-3	AS Monaco	Boulogne-sur-Mer
19:00 CEST (UTC+2)	Marcq (yellow card) 33' das Neves (red card) 38'; Dembélé (yellow card) 46'; Blayac 66'	Report	Park 36'; Nenê (yellow card) 44' (goal) 86', 90+2'; Adriano (yellow card) 77'; Alonso (yellow card) 81'; Traoré (yellow card) 89'	Stadium: Stade de la Libération; Attendance: 13,686; Referee: Hervé Piccirillo

31 October 2009 12	Girondins de Bordeaux	1-0	AS Monaco	Bordeaux
19:00 CET (UTC+1)	Chalmé 20'; Planus 62'	Report	Coutadeur (yellow card) 22'; Mongongu (yellow card) 27'; Pérez (yellow card) 44'	Stadium: Stade Chaban-Delmas; Attendance: 32,308; Referee: Philippe Malige

7 November 2009 13	AS Monaco	0-0	Grenoble	Monaco
19:00 CET (UTC+1)		Report	Juan (yellow card) 36'	Stadium: Stade Louis II; Attendance: 6,347; Referee: Sébastien Moreira

21 November 2009 14	Auxerre	2-0	AS Monaco	Auxerre
21:00 CET (UTC+1)	Coulibaly 45+1'; N'Dinga (yellow card) 64' (goal) 87'	Report	Park (yellow card) 28'; Traoré (yellow card) 45'; Alonso (yellow card) 62'; Eduardo (yellow card) 78'	Stadium: Stade de l'Abbé-Deschamps; Attendance: 14,951; Referee: Tony Chapron

5 December 2009 16	Valenciennes	3-1	AS Monaco	Valenciennes
19:00 CET (UTC+1)	Ducourtioux 27'; Tiéné (yellow card) 49'; Sánchez (yellow card) 72'; Mater (yellow card) 80'; Samassa 85'; Ben Khalfallah 90+2'	Report	Puygrenier (yellow card) 33'; Nenê 50' (pen.); Pérez (yellow card) 57'	Stadium: Stade du Hainaut; Attendance: 12,464; Referee: Saïd Ennjimi

13 December 2009 17	AS Monaco	0-4	Lille	Monaco
17:00 CET (UTC+1)	Puygrenier (yellow card) 21'; Park (yellow card) 26'; Adriano (yellow card) 53' (yellow-red card) 71'	Report	de Melo 39', 55'; Hazard (yellow card) 42'; Cabaye 71' (pen.); Aubameyang 86'	Stadium: Stade Louis II; Attendance: 6,323; Referee: Wilfried Bien

16 December 2009 11	AS Monaco	1-0	Rennes	Monaco
19:00 CET (UTC+1)	Park 20' (yellow card) 90+4'	Report	Tettey (yellow card) 90+3'	Stadium: Stade Louis II; Attendance: 5,555; Referee: Laurent Duhamel

20 December 2009 18	AS Monaco	1-1	Lyon	Monaco
21:00 CET (UTC+1)	Park 35'; Gosso (yellow card) 45+1'; N'Koulou (yellow card) 59'	Report	Bastos 22'; Cissokho (yellow card) 52'; Pjanić (yellow card) 53'; Gonalons (yellow card) 71'; Toulalan (yellow card) 90'	Stadium: Stade Louis II; Attendance: 10,620; Referee: Stéphane Bré

23 December 2009 19	Le Mans	1-1	AS Monaco	Le Mans
19:00 CET (UTC+1)	Le Tallec 37'; Cerdan (yellow card) 54'	Report	Modesto (yellow card) 32'; Park 50'; Alonso (yellow card) 54'; Pérez (yellow card) 85'; Puygrenier (yellow card) 90+2'	Stadium: MMArena; Attendance: 8,661; Referee: Lionel Jaffredo

13 January 2010 15	AS Monaco	4-0	Montpellier	Monaco
20:00 CET (UTC+1)	Puygrenier 11'; Haruna 55', 66' (yellow card) 56'; El Kaoutari 87' (o.g.)	Report	Belhanda (yellow card) 37' (yellow-red card) 72'; Collin (yellow card) 53'; Yanga-Mbiwa (yellow card) 83'	Stadium: Stade Louis II; Attendance: 5,763; Referee: Stéphane Lannoy

16 January 2010 20	AS Monaco	2-0	Sochaux	Monaco
21:00 CET (UTC+1)	Haruna (yellow card) 39'; Nenê 84', 90+1'	Report	Martin (yellow card) 27'; Bréchet (yellow card) 44'; Gavanon (yellow card) 45+1'	Stadium: Stade Louis II; Attendance: 5,640; Referee: Fredy Fautrel

20 January 2010 21	Paris Saint-Germain	0–1	AS Monaco	Paris
19:00 CET (UTC+1)	Chantôme (yellow card) 75'; Erdinç (yellow card) 90+1'	Report	Park (yellow card) 18'; Mongongu (yellow card) 21'; Edel 68' (o.g.); Muratori (yellow card) 79'; Alonso (yellow card) 90'; Puygrenier (yellow card) 90+1'	Stadium: Parc des Princes; Attendance: 32,603; Referee: Ruddy Buquet

30 January 2010 22	AS Monaco	3-2	Nice	Monaco
19:00 CET (UTC+1)	Park 19', 60' (yellow card) 63'; Nenê 62'; Puygrenier (yellow card) 79'	Report	Poté (yellow card) 36'; Ben Saada 54'; Civelli (yellow card) 73' (yellow-red card) 90'; Digard 80'	Stadium: Stade Louis II; Attendance: 10,420; Referee: Olivier Thual

7 February 2010 23	Saint-Étienne	3-0	AS Monaco	Saint-Étienne
CEST (UTC+2)	Matuidi 14'; Perrin (yellow card) 50'; Bergessio 74'; Rivière (yellow card) 90+2'	Report	Puygrenier (yellow card) 37'	Stadium: Stade Geoffroy-Guichard; Attendance: 23,241; Referee: Hervé Piccirillo

13 February 2010 24	AS Monaco	1-2	Marseille	Monaco
19:00 CET (UTC+1)	Nenê (yellow card) 30'; Maazou 40'; Mongongu (yellow card) 42'; Modesto (yellow card) 82'; Alonso (yellow card) 90+2' (red card) 90+2'	Report	Niang (yellow card) 30' (goal) 37' (pen.); Mbia (yellow card) 33'; Diawara (yellow card) 54'; N'Koulou 89' (o.g.)	Stadium: Stade Louis II; Attendance: 13,063; Referee: Saïd Ennjimi

20 February 2010 25	Lens	3-0	AS Monaco	Lens
19:00 CET (UTC+1)	Jemâa 31'; Roudet 43'; Bedimo 52' (pen.)	Report	Maâzou (yellow card) 47'; Pérez (yellow card) 75'; Haruna (yellow card) 82'	Stadium: Stade Bollaert-Delelis; Attendance: 33,493; Referee: Damien Ledentu

27 February 2010 26	AS Monaco	1-0	Boulogne	Monaco
19:00 CET (UTC+1)	Maâzou 41'; Haruna (yellow card) 51'; Traoré (yellow card) 65'	Report	Lecointe (yellow card) 67'; Lévêque (yellow card) 72'; Bellaïd (yellow card) 88'	Stadium: Stade Louis II; Attendance: 5,926; Referee: Fredy Fautrel

6 March 2010 27	Rennes	1-0	AS Monaco	Rennes
19:00 CET (UTC+1)	Bocanegra 28'; Lemoine (yellow card) 33'; Danzé (yellow card) 54'	Report	Puygrenier (yellow card) 27'; Nenê (yellow card) 86'	Stadium: Stade de la Route de Lorient; Attendance: 23,177; Referee: Philippe Malige

13 March 2010 28	AS Monaco	0-0	Girondins de Bordeaux	Monaco
19:00 CET (UTC+1)	Mongongu (yellow card) 18'; Haruna (yellow card) 62'	Report	Diarra (yellow card) 62'	Stadium: Stade Louis II; Attendance: 9,535; Referee: Tony Chapron

20 March 2010 29	Grenoble	0-0	AS Monaco	Grenoble
19:00 CET (UTC+1)	Dieuze (yellow card) 42'; Boya (yellow card) 43'; Vitakić (yellow card) 54'; Viviani (red card) 79'	Report	Mollo (yellow card) 36'; Modesto (yellow card) 43'	Stadium: Stade des Alpes; Attendance: 12,949; Referee: Clément Turpin

29 March 2010 30	AS Monaco	0-0	Auxerre	Monaco
21:00 CEST (UTC+2)	Puygrenier (yellow card) 68'	Report	Oliech (yellow card) 16'	Stadium: Stade Louis II; Attendance: 6,037; Referee: Lionel Jaffredo

3 April 2010 31	Montpellier	0-0	AS Monaco	Montpellier
21:00 CEST (UTC+2)	Aït-Fana (yellow card) 22'; Jeunechamp (yellow card) 53'; Montaño (yellow card) 71'	Report	Lolo (yellow card) 14'; N'Koulou (yellow card) 27'; Mongongu (yellow card) 53'	Stadium: Stade de la Mosson; Attendance: 19,675; Referee: Pascal Viléo

10 April 2010 32	AS Monaco	2-1	Valenciennes	Monaco
19:00 CEST (UTC+2)	Muratori (yellow card) 23'; Maâzou (yellow card) 49' (goal) 78'; Nenê 61'	Report	Biševac 37'; Mater (yellow card) 42'	Stadium: Stade Louis II; Attendance: 6,685; Referee: Christian Guillard

18 April 2010 33	Lille	4-0	AS Monaco	Lille
17:00 CEST (UTC+2)	Chedjou 14'; Cabaye 45', 75' de Melo 90+1'	Report	Lolo (yellow card) 45'; Haruna (yellow card) 50'	Stadium: Stade Pierre-Mauroy; Attendance: 16,894; Referee: Laurent Duhamel

27 April 2010 35	AS Monaco	1-1	Le Mans	Monaco
19:00 CEST (UTC+2)	Alonso (yellow card) 20'; Maâzou 48'	Report	Dossevi 10'; Bouhours (yellow card) 25'; Géder (yellow card) 28'; Lamah (yellow card) 55'; Maïga (yellow card) 57'	Stadium: Stade Louis II; Attendance: 5,358; Referee: Philippe Malige

5 May 2010 36	Lorient	2-2	AS Monaco	Lorient
19:00 CEST (UTC+2)	Audard (yellow card) 33'; Amalfitano 42'; Diarra (yellow card) 44'; Gameiro 80'	Report	Alonso (yellow card) 33'; Haruna 41'; Muratori (yellow card) 54'; Maâzou (yellow card) 61' (goal) 72'; Mangani (yellow card) 88'	Stadium: Stade du Moustoir; Attendance: 15,436; Referee: Hervé Piccirillo

8 May 2010 37	AS Monaco	2-1	Nancy	Monaco
21:00 CEST (UTC+2)	Lotiès 7' (o.g.); Adriano (yellow card) 39'; N'Koulou (yellow card) 54'; Maâzou 58'; Muratori (red card) 73'	Report	Sami 75'; Berenguer (yellow card) 78'	Stadium: Stade Louis II; Attendance: 6,878; Referee: Antony Gautier

12 May 2010 34	Lyon	3–0	AS Monaco	Lyon
19:00 CEST (UTC+2)	Pjanić 28'; Gomis 48'; Lloris (yellow card) 65'; López 87'	Report	Adriano (yellow card) 14'; Ruffier (yellow card) 45'; Traoré (yellow card) 65'	Stadium: Stade de Gerland; Attendance: 38,432; Referee: Stéphane Lannoy

15 May 2010 38	Toulouse	0-0	AS Monaco	Toulouse
21:00 CEST (UTC+2)		Report	Puygrenier (yellow card) 69'; Nenê (yellow card) 87'	Stadium: Stadium Municipal; Attendance: 16,641; Referee: Bertrand Layec

=== Coupe de la Ligue ===
23 September 2009 Third Round	Nancy	2 - 0	AS Monaco	Nancy
20:45 CEST UTC+2	Féret 13'; Dia 82'	Summary	Mollo (yellow card) 48'; Alonso (yellow card) 79'; Nenê (yellow card) 90'	Stadium: Stade Marcel Picot; Attendance: 15,020; Referee: Tony Chapron

=== Coupe de France ===
9 January 2010 Round of 64	AS Monaco	0-0 (a.e.t.) (4 – 3 p)	Tours	Fontvieille
19:00 CET UTC+1		Summary		Stadium: Stade Louis II

24 January 2010 Round of 32	AS Monaco	2-1	Lyon	Fontvieille
20:45 CET UTC+1	Traoré (yellow card) 31'; Nenê 50'; Alonso (yellow card) 53'; Park 78'	Summary	Lovren (yellow card) 29'; Boumsong 45'	Stadium: Stade Louis II; Attendance: 4,818; Referee: Philippe Malige

10 February 2010 Round of 16	Bordeaux	0-2	AS Monaco	Bordeaux
20:45 CET UTC+1	Trémoulinas (yellow card) 44'; Ramé (yellow card) 58'	Summary	Traoré 27' (yellow card) 40'; N'Koulou (yellow card) 44'; Maâzou 53'; Pérez (yellow card) 73'; Ruffier (yellow card) 86'	Stadium: Stade Chaban-Delmas; Attendance: 14,062; Referee: Philippe Kalt

24 March 2010 Quarterfinal	AS Monaco	4-3 (a.e.t.)	Sochaux	Fontvieille
17:00 CET UTC+1	Puygrenier 34' (yellow card) 85'; Haruna 38'; Mangani (yellow card) 53'; Pino 90+4'; Maazou 95'; Pérez (yellow card) 119'	Summary	Gavanon (yellow card) 14'; Boudebouz 29'; Dalmat 48'; Bréchet (yellow card) 69'; Ideye 71'	Stadium: Stade Louis II; Attendance: 5,409; Referee: Antony Gautier

13 April 2010 Semifinal	AS Monaco	1-0 (a.e.t.)	Lens	Fontvieille
20:30 CEST UTC+2	Maazou 111'	Summary	Chelle (yellow card) 55'; Roudet (yellow card) 56'; Ramos (yellow card) 60'	Stadium: Stade Louis II; Attendance: 10,382; Referee: Stéphane Bré

1 May 2010 Final	AS Monaco	0-1 (a.e.t.)	Paris Saint-Germain	Saint-Denis
20:45 CEST UTC+2	Alonso (yellow card) 22'; Nenê (yellow card) 63'; Mongongu (yellow card) 105'; Costa (yellow card) 110'	Summary	Makélélé (yellow card) 59'; Hoarau 105' (yellow card) 110'	Stadium: Stade de France; Attendance: 75,000; Referee: Lionel Jaffredo

== Squad statistics ==
=== Appearances and goals ===
No.	Pos	Nat	Player	Total		Ligue 1		Coupe de France		Coupe de la Ligue	
No.	Pos	Nat	Player	Apps	Goals	Apps	Goals	Apps	Goals	Apps	Goals
1	GK	(France) FRA	Yohann Thuram-Ulien	1	0	1	0	0	0	0	0
2	DF	(Democratic Republic of the Congo) COD	Cédric Mongongu	39	0	33	0	5	0	1	0
3	DF	(Cameroon) CMR	Nicolas N'Koulou	28	0	21+3	0	2+1	0	1	0
4	DF	(France) FRA	François Modesto	30	0	23+1	0	6	0	0	0
5	MF	(Uruguay) URU	Diego Pérez	29	0	20+3	0	5	0	1	0
6	MF	(Brazil) BRA	Eduardo Costa	16	0	14+1	0	1	0	0	0
7	MF	(Ivory Coast) CIV	Jean-Jacques Gosso	10	0	7+1	0	0+1	0	1	0
8	MF	(Argentina) ARG	Alejandro Alonso	33	2	27	2	5	0	0+1	0
10	FW	(South Korea) KOR	Park Chu-young	33	9	26+1	8	5	1	0+1	0
11	FW	(Brazil) BRA	Nenê	41	15	34	14	6	1	0+1	0
12	DF	(Brazil) BRA	Adriano	17	0	15+1	0	1	0	0	0
13	DF	(France) FRA	Vincent Muratori	18	0	12+4	0	0+1	0	1	0
15	MF	(France) FRA	Thomas Mangani	19	0	10+4	0	5	0	0	0
16	GK	(France) FRA	Stéphane Ruffier	44	0	37	0	6	0	1	0
18	DF	(Mali) MLI	Djimi Traoré	35	1	28+1	0	6	1	0	0
20	FW	(Colombia) COL	Juan Pablo Pino	18	1	9+5	0	2+2	1	0	0
22	MF	(France) FRA	Mathieu Coutadeur	21	0	11+8	0	0+2	0	0	0
23	MF	(Croatia) CRO	Jerko Leko	5	0	0+4	0	0+1	0	0	0
24	FW	(Ivory Coast) CIV	Yannick Sagbo	17	0	1+14	0	1+1	0	0	0
25	MF	(Nigeria) NGR	Lukman Haruna	29	4	16+7	3	4+2	1	0	0
26	FW	(France) FRA	Yohan Mollo	20	0	7+11	0	0+1	0	1	0
28	DF	(France) FRA	Sébastien Puygrenier	41	3	36	2	5	1	0	0
31	FW	(Niger) NIG	Moussa Maâzou	22	9	10+8	6	0+4	3	0	0
32	DF	(Ivory Coast) CIV	Igor Lolo	18	0	8+7	0	1+1	0	1	0
Players away from the club on loan:
9	FW	(Iceland) ISL	Eiður Guðjohnsen	11	0	6+3	0	0+1	0	1	0
17	FW	(Togo) TOG	Serge Gakpé	4	0	0+3	0	0	0	1	0
27	FW	(France) FRA	Frédéric Nimani	9	1	2+6	1	0	0	1	0
Players who left Monaco during the season:
31	FW	(France) FRA	Djamel Bakar	4	0	4	0	0	0	0	0

=== Goal Scorers ===
Place	Position	Nation	Number	Name	Ligue 1	Coupe de France	Coupe de la Ligue	Total
1	FW	(Brazil)	11	Nenê	14	1	0	15
2	FW	(South Korea)	10	Park Chu-young	8	1	0	9
2	FW	(Niger)	31	Moussa Maâzou	6	3	0	9
4	MF	(Nigeria)	25	Lukman Haruna	3	1	0	4
5	DF	(France)	28	Sébastien Puygrenier	2	1	0	3
5				Own goal	3	0	0	3
7	MF	(Argentina)	8	Alejandro Alonso	2	0	0	1
8	FW	(France)	27	Frédéric Nimani	1	0	0	1
8	DF	(Mali)	18	Djimi Traoré	0	1	0	1
8	FW	(Colombia)	20	Juan Pablo Pino	0	1	0	1
				TOTALS	39	9	0	48

=== Disciplinary record ===
Number	Nation	Position	Name	Ligue 1		Coupe de France		Coupe de la Ligue		Total	
Number	Nation	Position	Name	Yellow card	Red card	Yellow card	Red card	Yellow card	Red card	Yellow card	Red card
2	(Democratic Republic of the Congo)	DF	Cédric Mongongu	6	0	1	0	0	0	7	0
3	(Cameroon)	DF	Nicolas N'Koulou	4	0	1	0	0	0	5	0
4	(France)	DF	François Modesto	3	0	0	0	0	0	3	0
5	(Uruguay)	MF	Diego Pérez	9	1	2	0	0	0	11	1
6	(Brazil)	MF	Eduardo Costa	2	0	1	0	0	0	3	0
7	(Ivory Coast)	MF	Jean-Jacques Gosso	2	0	0	0	0	0	2	0
8	(Argentina)	MF	Alejandro Alonso	11	1	2	0	1	0	14	1
10	(South Korea)	FW	Park Chu-young	4	0	0	0	0	0	4	0
11	(Brazil)	FW	Nenê	5	0	1	0	1	0	7	0
12	(Brazil)	DF	Adriano	8	1	0	0	0	0	8	1
13	(France)	DF	Vincent Muratori	4	1	0	0	0	0	4	1
15	(France)	MF	Thomas Mangani	1	0	1	0	0	0	2	0
16	(France)	GK	Stéphane Ruffier	1	0	1	0	0	0	2	0
18	(Mali)	DF	Djimi Traoré	7	0	2	0	0	0	9	0
22	(France)	MF	Mathieu Coutadeur	1	0	0	0	0	0	1	0
24	(Ivory Coast)	FW	Yannick Sagbo	1	0	0	0	0	0	1	0
25	(Nigeria)	MF	Lukman Haruna	8	0	0	0	0	0	8	0
26	(France)	FW	Yohan Mollo	1	0	0	0	1	0	2	0
28	(France)	DF	Sébastien Puygrenier	11	0	1	0	0	0	12	0
31	(Niger)	FW	Moussa Maâzou	3	0	0	0	0	0	3	0
32	(Ivory Coast)	DF	Igor Lolo	2	0	0	0	0	0	2	0
			TOTALS	94	4	13	0	3	0	110	4
