= 2012–13 AC Ajaccio season =

AC Ajaccio
2012–13 season
- Chairman: Alain Orsoni
- Manager: Alex Dupont
- Stadium: Stade François Coty
- Ligue 1: 17th
- Coupe de France: End of 64
- Coupe de la Ligue: Third round
- Challenge Michel Moretti: Winners
- Top goalscorer: League: Eduardo (1); All: Eduardo (1)
- Highest home attendance: 9,402 vs PSG (19 August 2012)
- Lowest home attendance: 5,874 vs Evian (2 September 2012)
- Average home league attendance: 7,638
Home colours	Away colours	Third colours

The 2012–13 season was AC Ajaccio's 95th season.

== Transfers ==
=== In ===
Date	Name	Moving from	Moving to	Fee
14 June 2012	(Senegal) Ricardo Faty	(Greece) Aris	Ajaccio	Free
27 June 2012	(Belgium) Brandon Deville	(Belgium) Anderlecht	Ajaccio	Free
28 June 2012	(France) Chakhir Belghazouani	(Belgium) Zulte Waregem	Ajaccio	Free
3 July 2012	(Mali) Sigamary Diarra	Lorient	Ajaccio	Free

=== Out ===
Date	Name	Moving from	Moving to	Fee
3 July 2012	(France) Yannick Gigliarelli	Ajaccio	Gazélec Ajaccio	Free
12 July 2012	(Brazil) Ilan	Ajaccio	Bastia	Free
13 July 2012	(France) Richard Socrier	Ajaccio	Angers	Free

== Current squad and statistics ==
As of 25 August 2012

No.	Pos	Nat	Player	Total		Ligue 1		Coupe de France		Coupe de la Ligue	
No.	Pos	Nat	Player	Apps	Goals	Apps	Goals	Apps	Goals	Apps	Goals
1	GK	(Mexico) MEX	Guillermo Ochoa	3	0	3+0	0	0	0	0	0
16	GK	(Mali) MLI	Oumar Sissoko	0	0	0	0	0	0	0	0
30	GK	(France) FRA	David Oberhauser	1	0	0+1	0	0	0	0	0
5	DF	(France) FRA	Mickael Charvet	0	0	0	0	0	0	0	0
13	DF	(France) FRA	Fabrice Begeorgi	2	0	1+1	0	0	0	0	0
17	DF	(France) FRA	Yoann Poulard	3	0	3+0	0	0	0	0	0
20	DF	(France) FRA	Anthony Lippini	0	0	0	0	0	0	0	0
22	DF	(Mali) MLI	Fousseni Diawara	3	0	3+0	0	0	0	0	0
23	DF	(France) FRA	Arnaud Maire	1	0	0+1	0	0	0	0	0
26	DF	(France) FRA	Samuel Bouhours	2	0	2+0	0	0	0	0	0
28	DF	(Brazil) BRA	Felipe Saad	0	0	0	0	0	0	0	0
4	MF	(Senegal) SEN	Ricardo Faty	3	0	3+0	0	0	0	0	0
6	MF	(Algeria) ALG	Carl Medjani	3	0	3+0	0	0	0	0	0
7	MF	(France) FRA	Benjamin André	3	0	3+0	0	0	0	0	0
8	MF	(France) FRA	Jean-Baptiste Pierazzi (captain)	3	0	3+0	0	0	0	0	0
10	MF	(France) FRA	Chakhir Belghazouani	2	0	0+2	0	0	0	0	0
11	MF	(France) FRA	Karim El Hany	0	0	0	0	0	0	0	0
12	MF	(France) FRA	Frédéric Sammaritano	0	0	0	0	0	0	0	0
14	MF	(Algeria) ALG	Mehdi Mostefa	1	0	1+0	0	0	0	0	0
18	MF	(France) FRA	Johan Cavalli	2	0	2+0	0	0	0	0	0
19	MF	(France) FRA	Paul Lasne	2	0	0+2	0	0	0	0	0
24	MF	(France) FRA	Damien Tibéri	1	0	0+1	0	0	0	0	0
25	MF	(Belgium) BEL	Brandon Deville	0	0	0	0	0	0	0	0
9	FW	(France) FRA	Andy Delort	1	0	0+1	0	0	0	0	0
15	FW	(France) FRA	David Gigliotti	0	0	0	0	0	0	0	0
27	FW	(Mali) MLI	Sigamary Diarra	3	0	3+0	0	0	0	0	0
29	FW	(Brazil) BRA	Eduardo	3	1	3+0	1	0	0	0	0

== Friendly matches ==
12 July 2012 Friendly match	Bastia	2–1	Ajaccio	Corte, France
	Yatabaré 66'; Thauvin 82'	Report	36' Belghazouani	Stadium: Stade Santos Manfredi; Attendance: 1,800; Referee: Sébastien Moreira

18 July 2012 Friendly match	Ajaccio	2–1	Bordeaux	Biscarrosse, France
	Eduardo 37' (pen.); S. Diarra 41'	Report	26' Ben Khalfallah	Attendance: 1,500

21 July 2012 Friendly match	Ajaccio	0–0	Toulouse	Tarbes, France

28 July 2012 Friendly match	UNFP	0–2	Ajaccio	Fos-sur-Mer, France
		Report	10' Eduardo; 11' S. Diarra	Stadium: Stade Municipal

== Competitions ==
=== Ligue 1 ===
==== League table ====
Pos	Team	Pld	W	D	L	GF	GA	GD	Pts	Qualification or relegation
15	Sochaux	38	10	11	17	41	57	−16	41	
16	Evian	38	10	10	18	46	53	−7	40	
17	Ajaccio	38	9	15	14	39	51	−12	40 (Note: On 9 August 2012, Ajaccio was docked two points, one suspended, by the Disciplinary Committee of the Ligue de Football Professionnel for the 2012–13 season because of incidents during a 2011–12 league match against Lyon.)	
18	Nancy (R)	38	9	11	18	38	58	−20	38	Relegation to Ligue 2
19	Troyes (R)	38	8	13	17	43	61	−18	37	Relegation to Ligue 2

Source: Ligue 1
Rules for classification: 1) points; 2) goal difference; 3) number of goals scored.
(R) Relegated

==== Results summary ====
Overall								Home						Away					
Pld	W	D	L	GF	GA	GD	Pts	W	D	L	GF	GA	GD	W	D	L	GF	GA	GD
38	9	15	14	39	50	−11	42	7	5	7	19	20	−1	2	10	7	20	30	−10

Last updated: 18 May 2013.
Source: lfp.fr

==== Results by round ====
Round	1	2	3	4	5	6	7	8	9	10	11	12	13	14	15	16	17	18	19	20	21	22	23	24	25	26	27	28	29	30	31	32	33	34	35	36	37	38
Ground	A	H	A	H	A	H	A	H	A	H	A	A	H	A	H	A	H	A	H	A	H	A	H	A	H	A	H	A	H	A	H	A	H	H	A	H	A	H
Result	W	D	L	W	L	D	W	L	D	D	L	W	L	D	D	L	W	L	L	D	D	D	W	W	D	L	L	W	D	L	D	D	L	W	D	L	D	L
Position	7	9	16	14	14	14	14	14	14	14	16	16	16	16	16	16	16	16	16	15	13	13	13	13	13	14	14	13	13	15	15	15	15	15	15	15	16	17

Source: lfp.fr
A = Away; H = Home; W = Win; D = Draw; L = Loss

==== Matches ====
Win Draw Loss Postponed

11 August 2012 1	Nice	0–1	Ajaccio	Nice, France
21:00 (UTC+1)		Report	11' Eduardo; (red card) 45' Mostefa	Stadium: Stade du Ray; Attendance: 9,342; Referee: Ruddy Buquet

19 August 2012 2	Ajaccio	0–0	Paris Saint-Germain	Ajaccio, France
21:00 (UTC+1)		Report	(red card) 58' Lavezzi	Stadium: Stade François Coty; Attendance: 9,402; Referee: Clément Turpin

25 August 2012 3	Valenciennes	3–0	Ajaccio	Valenciennes, France
20:00 (UTC+1)	M. Samassa 16'; Néry 56'; Oberhauser 80' (o.g.)	Report	(red card) 40' Pierazzi	Stadium: Stade du Hainaut; Attendance: 11,876; Referee: Nicolas Rainville

1 September 2012 4	Ajaccio	2–0	Evian	Ajaccio, France
20:00 (UTC+1)	Medjani 20'; Cavalli 42'	Report		Stadium: Stade François Coty; Attendance: 5,874; Referee: Sébastien Moreira

16 September 2012 5	Olympique Lyonnais	2–0	Ajaccio	Lyon, France
17:00 (UTC+1)	Grenier (yellow card) 15'; Lovern 26'; López 75'	Summary	Bonhours (yellow card) 13'; Mutu (yellow card) 70'	Stadium: Stade de Gerland; Attendance: 25,666; Referee: Bartolomeu Varela

23 September 2012 6	Bordeaux	2–2	Ajaccio	Bordeaux, France
14:00 (UTC+1)	Henrique (yellow card) 23' (goal) 54'; Sertic (yellow card) 48'; Carrasso (yellow card) 73'; Gouffran 78'	Summary	Bouhours (yellow card) 35'; Faty 64'; Belghazouani 90+1'	Stadium: Stade Chaban-Delmas; Attendance: 16,295; Referee: Antony Gautier

29 September 2012 7	Ajaccio	1–0	Stade Brestois 29	Ajaccio, France
20:00 (UTC+1)	Mostefa 57'; Belghazouani (yellow card) 88'	Summary	Lička (yellow card) 46'; Coulibaly (yellow card) 62'	Stadium: Stade François Coty; Attendance: 6,029; Referee: Olivier Thual

6 October 2012 8	Lille OSC	2–0	Ajaccio	Villeneuve-d'Ascq, France
20:00 (UTC+1)	Roux 42'; Ryan Mendes 56'; Túlio de Melo (yellow card) 59'; Balmont (yellow card) 66'	Summary	Mutu (yellow card) 3'	Stadium: Grand Stade Lille Métropole; Attendance: 39,375; Referee: Lionel Jaffredo

21 October 2012 9	Ajaccio	0–0	Bastia	Ajaccio, France
14:00 (UTC+1)	Bouhours (yellow card) 65'; André (yellow card) 80'; Cavalli (red card) 83'	Summary	Modeste (yellow card) 78'; Angoula (red card) 83'; Harek (yellow card) 90+2'	Stadium: Stade François Coty; Attendance: 10,344; Referee: Laurent Duhamel

28 October 2012 10	FC Lorient	4–4	Ajaccio	Lorient, France
14:00 (UTC+1)	Bourillon (yellow card) 12'; Lautoa 33'; Aliadière 46', 79'; Sunu 90'	Summary	Belghazouani 1'; Mutu 11' (yellow card) 35'; Eduardo 40', 45'; Poulard (yellow card) 41'; André (yellow card) 86'	Stadium: Stade du Moustoir; Attendance: 15,191; Referee: Jean-Charles Cailleux

4 November 2012 11	Ajaccio	0–2	Marseille	Ajaccio, France
14:00 (UTC+1)	Medjani (yellow card) 70'; Gigliotti (yellow card) 80'	Summary	Ayew (yellow card) 48' (goal) 55'; Abdallah (yellow card) 64'; Ayew 87'	Stadium: Stade François Coty; Attendance: 6,920; Referee: Alexandre Castro

10 November 2012 12	Toulouse	2–4	Ajaccio	Toulouse, France
20:00 (UTC+1)	Lippini 4' (o.g.); Tabanou (yellow card) 61'; Didot (yellow card) 69'; Abdennour 72'; Akpa Akpro (yellow card) 81'	Summary	Sammaritano 16'; Belghazouani 34', 90+2'; Mostefa (yellow card) 38'; Faty (yellow card) 44'; Diarra 67'	Stadium: Stadium Municipal; Attendance: 10,431; Referee: Bartolomeu Varela

17 November 2012 13	Ajaccio	0–1	Sochaux	Ajaccio, France
20:00 (UTC+1)	Mutu (yellow card) 51'; Lasne (yellow card) 84'	Summary	Bouhours 11' (o.g.)	Stadium: Stade François Coty; Attendance: 6,163; Referee: Amaury Delerue

24 November 2012 14	AS Nancy	1–1	Ajaccio	Tomblaine, France
20:00 (UTC+1)	Bakar 8'; Lotiès (yellow card) 10'; Puygrenier (yellow card) 76'; Sané (yellow card) 82'; André Luiz (yellow card) 90'	Summary	Faty (yellow card) 24'; Mutu 76' (pen.)	Stadium: Stade Marcel Picot; Attendance: 13,659; Referee: Olivier Thual

30 November 2012 15	Ajaccio	0–0	Saint-Étienne	Ajaccio, France
20:45 (UTC+1)		Summary		Stadium: Stade François Coty; Attendance: 5,939; Referee: Mikael Lesage

8 December 2012 16	Montpellier	3–0	Ajaccio	Montpellier
20:00 (UTC+1)	Pitau (yellow card) 16'; Utaka 28'; Cabella 32'; Belhanda 67'	Summary	Boulhours (yellow card) 23'; Faty (yellow card) 48'	Stadium: Stade de la Mosson; Attendance: 11,258; Referee: Said Ennjimi

12 December 2012 17	Ajaccio	2–0	Reims	Ajaccio, France
19:00 (UTC+1)	Cavalli (yellow card) 13'; Belghazouani (yellow card) 24'; Mutu 31' (yellow card) 51'; Tacalfred 77' (o.g.)	Summary		Stadium: Stade François Coty; Attendance: 5,843; Referee: Tony Chapron

15 December 2012 18	Troyes	3–2	Ajaccio	Troyes
20:00 (UTC+1)	Darbion 34'; Nivet 39'; Camus 45+1'; Marcos (yellow card) 74'	Summary	Pierazzi (yellow card) 23'; Belghazouani (yellow card) 42'; Lasne 90'; Cavalli 90+3'	Stadium: Stade de l'Aube; Attendance: 17,474; Referee: Fredy Fautrel

22 December 2012 19	Ajaccio	2–4	Stade Rennais	Ajaccio, France
20:00 (UTC+1)	Mutu 2'; Diawara 42'; Mostefa (yellow card) 45+1'; Cavalli (yellow card) 54'	Summary	Alessandrini (yellow card) 9' (goal) 44'; Féret 17' (pen.), 72'; Diarra 60'	Stadium: Stade François Coty; Attendance: 6,312; Referee: Ruddy Buquet

11 January 2013 20	Paris Saint-Germain	0–0	Ajaccio	Paris
21:00 (UTC+1)	Thiago Motta (red card) 45+1'; Ibrahimović (yellow card) 89'	Summary	Sammaritano (yellow card) 41'; Delort (yellow card) 73'	Stadium: Parc des Princes; Attendance: 42,008; Referee: Nicolas Rainville

19 January 2013 21	Ajaccio	1–1	Valenciennes	Ajaccio, France
20:00 (UTC+1)	Mutu 30'; Lippini (yellow card) 58'; Delort (yellow card) 83'	Summary	Bong (yellow card) 28'; Isimat-Mirin (yellow card) 55'; Nguette (yellow card) 57' (goal) 69'; Angoua (red card) 64'	Stadium: Stade François Coty; Attendance: 6,052; Referee: Jean Cailleux

26 January 2013 22	Evian	1–1	Ajaccio	Annecy
20:00 (UTC+1)	Wass 54'; Mbarki (yellow card) 71'	Summary	Felipe Saad (yellow card) 25'; Oliech 36'; Lasne (yellow card) 50'	Stadium: Parc des Sports; Attendance: 7,601; Referee: Benoît Millot

3 February 2013 23	Ajaccio	3–1	Olympique Lyonnais	Ajaccio, France
14:00 (UTC+1)	Mutu (yellow card) 34' (goal) 65', 90+2' (pen.); Belghazouani 57'; Mostefa (yellow card) 66'; Oliech (yellow card) 89'	Summary	Lacazette 53'; Ghezzal (yellow card) 63'; Lovren (red card) 90'; Anthony Martial (yellow card) 90+4'	Stadium: Stade François Coty; Attendance: 6,987; Referee: Lionel Jaffredo

9 February 2013 24	Ajaccio	1–0	Bordeaux	Ajaccio, France
20:00 (UTC+1)	Faty 31' (yellow card) 70'; Felipe Saad (yellow card) 45+2'	Summary		Stadium: Stade François Coty; Attendance: 6,513; Referee: Fredy Fautrel

16 February 2013 25	Stade Brestois 29	1–1	Ajaccio	Brest, France
20:00 (UTC+1)	Raspentino 12'; Chafni (yellow card) 76'	Summary	Lasne (yellow card) 27'; Oliech 70'; Felipe Saad (yellow card) 88'	Stadium: Stade Francis-Le Blé; Attendance: 12,067; Referee: Laurent Duhamel

23 February 2013 26	Ajaccio	1–3	Lille OSC	Ajaccio, France
20:00 (UTC+1)	Belghazouani 77'	Summary	Poulard 38' (o.g.); Balmont (yellow card) 39'; Digne (red card) 61'; Payet 67', 74'	Stadium: Stade François Coty; Attendance: 5,873; Referee: Benoit Bastien

2 March 2013 27	Bastia	1–0	Ajaccio	Bastia, France
20:00 (UTC+1)	Marchal (yellow card) 14'; Choplin (yellow card) 43'; Maoulida 47'; Rothen (red card) 90+7'; Thauvin (red card) 90+7'	Summary	Chalmé (yellow card) 54' (yellow-red card); Oliech (yellow card) 56' (yellow-red card) bouhours (yellow card) 80'; André (red card) 90+7'	Stadium: Stade Armand Cesari; Attendance: 15,205; Referee: Clement Turpin

9 March 2013 28	Ajaccio	1–0	FC Lorient	Ajaccio, France
20:00 (UTC+1)	Zubar 75'; Lippini (yellow card) 85'	Summary	Manga (yellow card) 69'; Gassama (yellow card) 77'	Stadium: Stade François Coty; Attendance: 6,344; Referee: Benoît Millot

15 March 2013 29	Marseille	0–0	Ajaccio	Marseille
20:30 (UTC+1)		Summary	Sammaritano (yellow card) 64'	Stadium: Stade Vélodrome; Attendance: 30,986; Referee: Nicolas Rainville

30 March 2013 30	Ajaccio	2–3	Toulouse	Ajaccio, France
20:00 (UTC+1)	Zebina 18' (o.g.); Mutu 41'; Lasne (yellow card) 90+1'	Summary	Capoue 25' 79' (pen.); Tabanou 32'; Zebina (yellow card) 73'; Abdennour (yellow card) 90+2'	Stadium: Stade François Coty; Attendance: 6,524; Referee: Philippe Kalt

6 April 2013 31	Sochaux	0–0	Ajaccio	Montbéliard
20:00 (UTC+1)	Bakambu (yellow card) 19'	Summary	Ochoa (yellow card) 61'; Chalmé (yellow card) 68'	Stadium: Stade Auguste Bonal; Attendance: 16,818; Referee: Bartolomeu Varela

13 April 2013 32	Ajaccio	1–1	Nancy	Ajaccio, France
20:00 (UTC+1)	Mostefa 7'; André (yellow card) 57'; Chalmé (yellow card) 67'	Summary	Alo'o 5'	Stadium: Stade François Coty; Attendance: 6,500; Referee: Laurent Duhamel

24 April 2013 33	Saint-Étienne	4–2	Ajaccio	Saint-Étienne
18:30 (UTC+1)	Aubameyang 23', 88'; Bodmer 48'; Cohade 50'; Perrin (yellow card) 78'; Ghoulam (yellow card) 81'	Summary	Mutu 15' 76' (pen.); Zubar (yellow card) 54'; Cavalli (yellow card) 70'	Stadium: Stade Geoffroy-Guichard; Attendance: 25,084; Referee: Stephane Lannoy

27 April 2013 34	Ajaccio	2–1	Montpellier HSC	Ajaccio, France
20:00 (UTC+1)	Mutu (yellow card) 16'; Diawara (red card) 47'; Lasne (yellow card) 63'; Delort 82' (pen.); Oliech 90+1'	Summary	Mounier 56'; Belhanda (yellow card) 60'; El Kaoutari (red card) 81'	Stadium: Stade François Coty; Attendance: 5,991; Referee: Mikael Lesage

4 May 2013 35	Reims	1–1	Ajaccio	Reims
20:00 (UTC+1)	Signorino (yellow card) 8'; Mandi 36'; Agassa (yellow card) 64'	Summary	Mutu 24'; Belghazouani (yellow card) 55'; Cavalli (yellow card) 72'; Ochoa (yellow card) 90+2'	Stadium: Stade Auguste Delaune; Attendance: 16,842; Referee: Amaury Delerue

11 May 2013 36	Ajaccio	0–1	Troyes	Ajaccio, France
20:00 (UTC+1)		Summary	Jarjat 17'	Stadium: Stade François Coty; Attendance: 7,300; Referee: (France) Wilfried Bien

18 May 2013 37	Rennes	1–1	Ajaccio	Rennes
21:00 (UTC+1)	Erdinç 45+1' (yellow card) 87'	Summary	Diawara 5'; Mostefa (yellow card) 33'; Zubar (yellow card) 81'; André (yellow card) 84'; Belghazouani (yellow card) 90+2'	Stadium: Stade de la Route de Lorient; Attendance: 15,805; Referee: (France) Jean-Charles Cailleux

26 May 2013 38	Ajaccio	0–2	Nice	Ajaccio, France
21:00 (UTC+1)				Stadium: Stade François Coty

=== Coupe de France ===
5 January 2013 Last 64	FC Rouen	1–1 (a.e.t.) (3–2 p)	AC Ajaccio	Rouen
18:00	Ousmane Cissokho (yellow card) 49'; Zerdab 62'; Julien Jahier (yellow card) 66'	Summary	Poulard (yellow card) 68'; Wilfried Zahibo 88'; Begeorgi (yellow card) 96'; Gigliotti (yellow card) 117'	Stadium: Stade Robert Diochon; Attendance: 4,993; Referee: Stephane Lannoy

=== Coupe de la Ligue ===
26 September 2012 Round 2	AC Arles-Avignon	2–1	AC Ajaccio	Avignon
20:00	Dalé 61'; Draman 90+4'	Summary	Faty 86'	Stadium: Parc des Sports (Avignon); Attendance: 437; Referee: Ruddy Buquet

=== Challenge Michel Moretti ===
4 August 2012 Final	Ajaccio	2–1	(Italy) Cagliari	Ajaccio, France
	Mostefa 32'; Cavalli 86'	Report	61' Conti	Stadium: Stade François Coty; Attendance: 2,500; Referee: Dany

== Statistics ==
=== Top scorers ===
As of 7 August 2012

Place	Position	Nation	Number	Name	Ligue 1	Coupe de France	Coupe de la Ligue	Total
1	MF	(France)	18	Cavalli	1	0	0	1
1	FW	(Brazil)	29	Eduardo	1	0	0	1
1	DF	(Algeria)	6	Medjani	1	0	0	1
TOTALS					3	0	0	3
