= 2026–27 US Boulogne season =

US Boulogne
2026–27 season
- Manager: Fabien Dagneaux
- Stadium: Stade de la Libération
- Ligue 2: 15th
- Coupe de France: Pre-season
- Top goalscorer: League: Abdel Hbouch (1); All: Abdel Hbouch (1)

The 2026–27 season is the 129th in the history of Union Sportive Boulogne Côte d'Opale and the second consecutive season in the French second division, Ligue 2. The club will also compete in the Coupe de France.

== Transfers ==
=== In ===
Pos.	Player	Transferred to	Fee	Date	Source
FW	(Bosnia and Herzegovina) Benjamin Bešić	(France) Bourg-en-Bresse	Free	1 July 2026	
FW	(France) Aymane Nassiri	(France) Istres FC	Free	1 July 2026	
DF	(France) Théo Brusco	(Luxembourg) FC Differdange 03	Undisclosed	1 July 2026	
FW	(France) Théo Epailly	(Croatia) Gorica	Undisclosed	9 July 2026	
FW	(France) Abdel Hbouch	(France) Annecy	Free	11 August 2026	
FW	(France) Ludéric Etonde	(France) Girondins Bordeaux	Free	1 September 2026	
DF	(France) Mathieu Mion	(France) Grenoble	Undisclosed	1 September 2026	

=== Out ===
Pos.	Player	Transferred to	Fee	Date	Source
DF	(France) Siad Gourville	(Belgium) RAAL La Louvière	Free	1 July 2026	
DF	(France) Nathan Zohoré	(Hungary) Ferencvárosi TC	Free	1 July 2026	
FW	(France) Souleymane Keita	(France) Dunkerque	Free	4 July 2026	
MF	(Ivory Coast) Hervé Touré	(Serbia) OFK Beograd	Undisclosed	13 July 2026	
MF	(France) Amine El Farissi	(Morocco) Maghreb Fez	Free	20 July 2026	
FW	(France) Christian Kitenge	(Luxembourg) FC Progrès Niederkorn	Free	20 Aug 2026	

== Pre-season ==
4 July 2026 Friendly	Anderlecht (Belgium)	0–0	(France) Boulogne
14:00

8 July 2026 Friendly	Boulogne (France)	0–1	(France) Versailles
17:00

25 July 2026 Friendly	Boulogne (France)	0–1	(France) FC Rouen
17:00

== Competitions ==
=== Overall record ===
Competition	First match	Last match	Starting round	Record							
Competition	First match	Last match	Starting round	Pld	W	D	L	GF	GA	GD	Win %
Ligue 2	8 August 2026		Matchday 1	5	0	4	1	2	3	−1	0.00
Coupe de France				0	0	0	0	0	0	+0	—
Total				5	0	4	1	2	3	−1	0.00

Last updated: 4 September 2026
Source: Competitions

=== Ligue 2 ===
Pos	Team	Pld	W	D	L	GF	GA	GD	Pts	Promotion or Relegation
12	Grenoble	6	2	1	3	7	10	−3	7	
13	Dijon	6	1	3	2	8	9	−1	6	
14	Boulogne	6	0	5	1	2	3	−1	5	
15	Pau	6	1	2	3	4	6	−2	5	
16	Clermont	6	0	5	1	3	5	−2	5	Qualification for relegation play-off

Updated to match(es) played on 14 September 2026. Source: Ligue 2
Rules for classification: 1) Points; 2) Goal difference; 3) Number of goals scored; 4) Head-to-head goal difference; 5) Fair play points

==== Results by round ====
Round	1	2	3	4	5
Ground	H	A	H	A	H
Result	D	L	D	D	D
Position					

Updated to match(es) played on 4 September 2026. Source:
A = Away; H = Home; W = Win; D = Draw; L = Loss

==== Matches ====
8 August 2026 1	Boulogne	0–0	Nancy	Boulogne-sur-Mer
20:45				Stadium: Stade de la Libération

14 August 2026 2	Guingamp	1–0	Boulogne	Guingamp
20:45

21 August 2026 3	Boulogne	1–1	Red Star	Boulogne-sur-Mer
20:00				Stadium: Stade de la Libération

28 August 2026 4	Montpellier	0–0	Boulogne	Montpellier
20:00

4 September 2026 5	Boulogne	1–1	Dijon	Boulogne-sur-Mer
20:00	Epailly 37'		Dong 63'	Stadium: Stade de la Libération; Referee: Eddy Rosier
