= 2020–21 Montpellier HSC season =

Montpellier
2020–21 season
- President: Laurent Nicollin
- Head coach: Michel Der Zakarian
- Stadium: Stade de la Mosson
- Ligue 1: 8th
- Coupe de France: Semi-finals
- Top goalscorer: League: Gaëtan Laborde (16); All: Andy Delort (19)
Home colours	Away colours	Third colours

The 2020–21 season was the 102nd season in the existence of Montpellier HSC and the club's 12th consecutive season in the top flight of French football. In addition to the domestic league, Montpellier participated in this season's edition of the Coupe de France. The season covered the period from 1 July 2020 to 30 June 2021.

== Players ==
=== First-team squad ===
Note: Flags indicate national team as defined under FIFA eligibility rules; some limited exceptions apply. Players may hold more than one non-FIFA nationality.

No.	Pos.	Nation	Player
1	GK	SUI	Jonas Omlin
2	DF	FRA	Arnaud Souquet
3	DF	FRA	Daniel Congré (vice-captain)
4	DF	BRA	Hilton (captain)
5	DF	POR	Pedro Mendes
6	MF	FRA	Junior Sambia
7	DF	SRB	Mihailo Ristić
9	FW	ALG	Andy Delort
10	FW	FRA	Gaëtan Laborde
11	MF	FRA	Téji Savanier
12	MF	FRA	Jordan Ferri
13	MF	FRA	Joris Chotard
14	MF	FRA	Damien Le Tallec
16	GK	FRA	Dimitry Bertaud

No.	Pos.	Nation	Player
18	FW	FRA	Yanis Ammour
19	FW	ENG	Stephy Mavididi
20	MF	RSA	Keagan Dolly
21	FW	FRA	Elye Wahi
24	FW	KOR	Yun Il-lok
25	MF	FRA	Florent Mollet
26	MF	FRA	Samy Benchama
27	DF	FRA	Clément Vidal
28	FW	CGO	Béni Makouana
30	GK	FRA	Mathis Carvalho
31	DF	FRA	Nicolas Cozza
32	FW	SRB	Petar Škuletić
—	DF	URU	Mathías Suárez

=== Out on loan ===
Note: Flags indicate national team as defined under FIFA eligibility rules; some limited exceptions apply. Players may hold more than one non-FIFA nationality.

No.	Pos.	Nation	Player
—	DF	CMR	Ambroise Oyongo (on loan at FC Krasnodar)
—	DF	FRA	Thibaut Vargas (on loan at LB Châteauroux)

No.	Pos.	Nation	Player
—	MF	FRA	Kylian Kaïboué (on loan at Sète)
—	FW	FRA	Bastian Badu (on loan at FC Chambly)

== Pre-season and friendlies ==
Win Draw Loss

25 July 2020 Friendly	Sète	Cancelled	Montpellier	Sète, France
19:00 CEST (UTC+2)				Stadium: Stade Louis Michel

28 July 2020 Friendly	Strasbourg	2–1	Montpellier	Divonne-les-Bains, France
17:00 CEST (UTC+2)	Ajorque 31' (pen.); Saadi 71'	Report	Mollet 15'	Stadium: Complexe sportif de Divonne-les-Bains

1 August 2020 Friendly	Bastia	2–2	Montpellier	Furiani, France
19:00 CEST (UTC+2)	Ben Saada 54' (pen.); Bocognano 90'	Report	Mavididi 35'; Savanier 51'	Stadium: Stade Armand Cesari

5 August 2020 Friendly	Marseille	Cancelled	Montpellier	Marseille, France
20:30 CEST (UTC+2)				Stadium: Stade Vélodrome

8 August 2020 Friendly	Montpellier	Cancelled	Clermont	Millau, France
18:30 CEST (UTC+2)		Report		Stadium: Stade Gabriel-Monteillet

14 August 2020 Friendly	Montpellier	3–1	Rodez	Montpellier, France
19:00 CEST (UTC+2)	Laborde 43'; Mendes 60'; Dolly 81'	Report	Bardy 2'	Stadium: Stade de la Mosson

22 August 2020 Friendly	Metz	1–1	Montpellier	Besançon, France
17:00 CEST (UTC+2)	Bronn (yellow card) 25'; Angban (yellow card) 52'; Boulaya 65'	Report	Laborde 41'	Stadium: Stade Léo Lagrange; Referee: Mathieu Vernice

4 September 2020 Friendly	Montpellier	1–3	Clermont	Montpellier, France
17:00 CEST (UTC+2)	Savanier 80'		Allevinah 54'; Tell 75'; Chader 90'	Stadium: Centre d'entraînement Bernard-Gasset

== Competitions ==
=== Overview ===
Competition	First match	Last match	Starting round	Final position	Record							
Competition	First match	Last match	Starting round	Final position	Pld	W	D	L	GF	GA	GD	Win %
Ligue 1	29 August 2020	23 May 2021	Matchday 1	8th	38	14	12	12	60	62	−2	36.84
Coupe de France	10 February 2021	12 May 2021	Round of 64	Semi-finals	5	4	1	0	9	4	+5	80.00
Total					43	18	13	12	69	66	+3	41.86

Source: Soccerway

=== Ligue 1 ===
==== League table ====
Pos	Team	Pld	W	D	L	GF	GA	GD	Pts	Qualification or relegation
6	Rennes	38	16	10	12	52	40	+12	58	Qualification for the Europa Conference League play-off round (Note: Since the winners of the 2020–21 Coupe de France, Paris Saint-Germain, qualified for European competition based on league position, the Europa League group stage spot reserved for the cup winners was passed to the fifth-placed team, and the Europa Conference League play-off round spot was passed to the sixth-placed team.)
7	Lens	38	15	12	11	55	54	+1	57	
8	Montpellier	38	14	12	12	60	62	−2	54	
9	Nice	38	15	7	16	50	53	−3	52	
10	Metz	38	12	11	15	44	48	−4	47	

Source: Ligue 1
Rules for classification: 1) Points; 2) Goal difference; 3) Goals scored; 4) Head-to-head goal difference; 5) Fairplay ranking.

==== Results summary ====
Overall								Home						Away					
Pld	W	D	L	GF	GA	GD	Pts	W	D	L	GF	GA	GD	W	D	L	GF	GA	GD
38	14	12	12	60	62	−2	54	7	4	8	34	35	−1	7	8	4	26	27	−1

Source: Ligue 1

==== Results by round ====
Round	1	2	3	4	5	6	7	8	9	10	11	12	13	14	15	16	17	18	19	20	21	22	23	24	25	26	27	28	29	30	31	32	33	34	35	36	37	38
Ground	H	A	H	H	A	H	A	H	A	A	H	A	H	A	H	A	H	A	H	H	A	H	A	H	A	H	A	H	A	H	A	H	A	A	H	A	H	A
Result	W	L	W	W	D	L	D	L	W	W	W	W	L	W	L	D	L	L	D	L	L	L	D	W	W	W	D	D	D	W	D	D	D	L	L	W	D	W
Position	13	15	5	3	3	5	7	11	9	7	4	5	6	5	5	6	8	9	8	11	11	11	11	11	8	9	8	7	9	8	8	8	8	8	8	8	8	8

Source: Ligue 1
A = Away; H = Home; W = Win; D = Draw; L = Loss

==== Matches ====
The league fixtures were announced on 9 July 2020.

29 August 2020 2	Rennes	2–1	Montpellier	Rennes
17:00 CEST (UTC+2)	Le Tallec 22' (o.g.); Nzonzi (yellow card) 53'; Da Silva (yellow card) 56'; Bourigeaud (yellow card) 71'; Terrier (red card) 73'; Camavinga 77'	Report	Mollet (red card) 43'; Savanier (yellow card) 45+1'; Ristić (yellow card) 60'; Laborde 90+1'	Stadium: Roazhon Park; Referee: Willy Delajod

12 September 2020 3	Montpellier	3–1	Nice	Montpellier
17:00 CEST (UTC+2)	Laborde 18'; Congré 50', 64'	Report	Maolida (yellow card) 40'; Dante 69'; Dolberg (yellow card) 82'	Stadium: Stade de la Mosson; Referee: Antony Gautier

15 September 2020 1	Montpellier	2–1	Lyon	Montpellier
21:00 CEST (UTC+2)	Delort (yellow card) 7'; Savanier 38' (pen.), 59'; Ferri (yellow card) 62'; Hilton (yellow card) 71', (red card) 81'	Report	Bruno Guimarães (yellow card) 36'; Aouar (red card) 44'; Toko Ekambi (yellow card) 45+2'; Depay 82' (pen.)	Stadium: Stade de la Mosson; Referee: Frank Schneider
Note: Match originally scheduled for 23 August, but postponed due the delayed conclusion of the knockout phase of the UEFA Champions League.

20 September 2020 4	Montpellier	4–1	Angers	Montpellier
15:00 CEST (UTC+2)	Congré (yellow card) 16'; Souquet 18', (yellow card) 41'; Delort (yellow card) 33', (goal) 43', 60'; Cozza (yellow card) 66'; Mollet 86'	Report	Ebosse (yellow card) 11'; Bahoken 25', (yellow card) 56'; Pavlović (yellow card) 62'	Stadium: Stade de la Mosson; Referee: Stéphanie Frappart

27 September 2020 5	Dijon	2–2	Montpellier	Dijon
15:00 CEST (UTC+2)	Dina-Ebimbe 8', (yellow card) 28'; Chafik (yellow card) 9'; Celina (yellow card) 19'; Manga 60'; Panzo (yellow card) 88'	Report	Delort 50'; Mavididi (yellow card) 77'; Savanier 90' (pen.)	Stadium: Stade Gaston Gérard; Referee: Aurélien Petit

4 October 2020 6	Montpellier	0–1	Nîmes	Montpellier
13:00 CEST (UTC+2)	Souquet (yellow card) 43'; Savanier (yellow card) 90'	Report	Briançon (yellow card) 34'; Ripart 84'	Stadium: Stade de la Mosson; Referee: Benoît Millot

18 October 2020 7	Monaco	1–1	Montpellier	Monaco
15:00 CEST (UTC+2)	Ben Yedder 70' (pen.); Pellegri (yellow card) 73'; Geubbels (yellow card) 90+2'	Report	Savanier (red card) 19'; Mavididi 51'; Souquet (yellow card) 90+4'	Stadium: Stade Louis II; Referee: Hakim Ben El Hadj

25 October 2020 8	Montpellier	0–4	Reims	Montpellier
15:00 CET (UTC+1)	Hilton (red card) 7'; Le Tallec (red card) 42'; Oyongo (yellow card) 55'	Report	Dia 9' (pen.), 13', 56' (pen.); Mbuku 31'	Stadium: Stade de la Mosson; Referee: Willy Delajod

1 November 2020 9	Saint-Étienne	0–1	Montpellier	Saint-Étienne
13:00 CET (UTC+1)	Khazri (yellow card) 31'; Hamouma (yellow card) 51'; Aouchiche (yellow card) 72'	Report	Mavididi 14'; Laborde (yellow card) 63'; Dolly (yellow card) 68'; Yun (yellow card) 90+1'	Stadium: Stade Geoffroy-Guichard; Attendance: 0 Referee: Jérôme Miguelgorry

7 November 2020 10	Bordeaux	0–2	Montpellier	Bordeaux
17:00 CET (UTC+1)	Kwateng (yellow card) 51'; Pablo (yellow card) 65'	Report	Ferri (yellow card) 32'; Mollet 49'; Delort 67'	Stadium: Matmut Atlantique; Attendance: 0 Referee: Antony Gautier

22 November 2020 11	Montpellier	4–3	Strasbourg	Montpellier
15:00 CET (UTC+1)	Mendes 8', (yellow card) 25'; Delort 13', 31'; Congré (yellow card) 54'; Laborde 68'	Report	Lala 22' (pen.); Diallo 26' (pen.); Ajorque 45'; Aholou (yellow card) 49'	Stadium: Stade de la Mosson; Attendance: 0 Referee: Jérôme Brisard

29 November 2020 12	Lorient	0–1	Montpellier	Lorient
15:00 CET (UTC+1)	Laporte (yellow card) 48'; Le Fée (yellow card) 52'	Report	Savanier (penalty missed) 45+2', (yellow card) 90'; Škuletić 79'	Stadium: Stade du Moustoir; Attendance: 0 Referee: Bastien Dechepy

5 December 2020 13	Montpellier	1–3	Paris Saint-Germain	Montpellier
21:00 CET (UTC+1)	Mavididi 41'; Savanier (yellow card) 71'	Report	Kurzawa (yellow card) 13'; Kean (yellow card) 23', (goal) 77'; Dagba 33', (yellow card) 42'; Mbappé 90+1'	Stadium: Stade de la Mosson; Attendance: 0 Referee: Mikael Lesage

12 December 2020 14	Lens	2–3	Montpellier	Lens
21:00 CET (UTC+1)	Omlin 36' (o.g.); Kakuta 50' (pen.); Cahuzac (yellow card) 75'	Report	Mavididi 16'; Mendes 26', (yellow card) 38'; Laborde 69'	Stadium: Stade Bollaert-Delelis; Attendance: 0 Referee: Jérémy Stinat

16 December 2020 15	Montpellier	0–2	Metz	Montpellier
19:00 CET (UTC+1)	Mollet (yellow card) 39'; Mavididi (yellow card) 64'; Laborde (yellow card) 76'	Report	Leya Iseka (yellow card) 7', (goal) 50' (pen.); Maïga (yellow card) 30', (goal) 90'; Delaine (yellow card) 38'	Stadium: Stade de la Mosson; Attendance: 0 Referee: Jérémie Pignard

20 December 2020 16	Brest	2–2	Montpellier	Brest
13:00 CET (UTC+1)	Chardonnet (yellow card) 45+2', (goal) 79'; Hérelle (yellow card) 51'; Philippoteaux 58'	Report	Laborde 45+1'; Chotard (yellow card) 66'; Delort 82'	Stadium: Stade Francis-Le Blé; Attendance: 0 Referee: Benoît Millot

23 December 2020 17	Montpellier	2–3	Lille	Montpellier
21:00 CET (UTC+1)	Sambia (yellow card) 50'; Laborde 57'; Ristić (yellow card) 66'; Delort 70'; Ferri (yellow card) 87'	Report	André (yellow card) 17'; Weah 23'; Ikoné 68' (pen.); Xeka (yellow card) 77'; Yılmaz 86'	Stadium: Stade de la Mosson; Attendance: 0 Referee: Clément Turpin

6 January 2021 18	Marseille	3–1	Montpellier	Marseille
21:00 CET (UTC+1)	Radonjić 41'; Payet 80'; Germain 84'	Report	Mollet 82'	Stadium: Stade Vélodrome; Attendance: 0 Referee: Stéphanie Frappart

9 January 2021 19	Montpellier	1–1	Nantes	Montpellier
21:00 CET (UTC+1)	Oyongo 6'; Souquet (yellow card) 31'; Delort (yellow card) 55'; Le Tallec (yellow card) 59'; Ferri (yellow card) 73'; Congré (yellow card) 75'	Report	Louza 51'	Stadium: Stade de la Mosson; Attendance: 0 Referee: François Letexier

15 January 2021 20	Montpellier	2–3	Monaco	Montpellier
21:00 CET (UTC+1)	Wahi 64'; Delort 69'; Chotard (yellow card) 83'; Savanier (yellow card) 90'	Report	Fofana (yellow card) 17'; Volland 24'; Ben Yedder 35', 61' (pen.); Aguilar (yellow card) 59'; Maripán (yellow card) 88'	Stadium: Stade de la Mosson; Attendance: 0 Referee: Aurélien Petit

22 January 2021 21	Paris Saint-Germain	4–0	Montpellier	Paris
21:00 CET (UTC+1)	Mbappé 34', 63'; Neymar 60', (yellow card) 76'; Icardi 61'; Verratti (yellow card) 82'	Report	Omlin (red card) 19'; Mendes (yellow card) 45+1'	Stadium: Parc des Princes; Attendance: 0 Referee: Willy Delajod

30 January 2021 22	Montpellier	1–2	Lens	Montpellier
17:00 CET (UTC+1)	Mavididi (yellow card) 15'; Mendes (yellow card) 16'; Laborde (yellow card) 18'; Hilton (yellow card) 48'; Wahi 78'	Report	Doucouré 7'; Sotoca (yellow card) 51'; Banza (yellow card) 55'; Kakuta 67'; Mauricio (yellow card) 83'; Haïdara (yellow card) 90'	Stadium: Stade de la Mosson; Attendance: 0 Referee: Amaury Delerue

3 February 2021 23	Metz	1–1	Montpellier	Metz
19:00 CET (UTC+1)	Boye (yellow card) 9'; Leya Iseka (yellow card) 33'; Sarr 47'; Maïga (yellow card) 74'; Centonze (yellow card) 76'; Bronn (yellow card) 82'; Ambrose (yellow card) 90+1'	Report	Congré (yellow card) 58'; Laborde 70'	Stadium: Stade Saint-Symphorien; Attendance: 0 Referee: Bastien Dechepy

7 February 2021 24	Montpellier	4–2	Dijon	Montpellier
15:00 CET (UTC+1)	Delort (yellow card) 31'; Mollet (yellow card) 39'; Laborde 48', 56'; Savanier 61'; Le Tallec (yellow card) 86'; Škuletić 90+1'	Report	Coulibaly 5', (yellow card) 44' (yellow-red card) 69'; Baldé (yellow card) 27'; Konaté 88' (pen.)	Stadium: Stade de la Mosson; Attendance: 0 Referee: Frank Schneider

13 February 2021 25	Lyon	1–2	Montpellier	Décines-Charpieu
21:00 CET (UTC+1)	Paquetá 45+1'	Report	Savanier 20'; Ristić (yellow card) 49'; Wahi 65'	Stadium: Parc Olympique Lyonnais; Attendance: 0 Referee: Antony Gautier

21 February 2021 26	Montpellier	2–1	Rennes	Montpellier
13:00 CET (UTC+1)	Mavididi 17', 27'; Savanier (yellow card) 23', (penalty missed) 51'	Report	Da Silva (yellow card) 64'; Guirassy 78'; Maouassa (yellow card) 89'	Stadium: Stade de la Mosson; Attendance: 0 Referee: Clément Turpin

28 February 2021 27	Reims	0–0	Montpellier	Reims
15:00 CET (UTC+1)	Dia (yellow card) 81'	Report	Hilton (yellow card) 64'	Stadium: Stade Auguste-Delaune; Attendance: 0 Referee: François Letexier

3 March 2021 28	Montpellier	1–1	Lorient	Montpellier
21:00 CET (UTC+1)	Mavididi 28'; Ferri (yellow card) 60'; Mendes (yellow card) 69'	Report	Grbić 9' (pen.); Lemoine (yellow card) 35'; Chalobah (yellow card) 62'; Gravillon (yellow card) 86'	Stadium: Stade de la Mosson; Attendance: 0 Referee: Benoît Bastien

14 March 2021 29	Nîmes	1–1	Montpellier	Nîmes
13:00 CET (UTC+1)	Alakouch (yellow card) 47'; Koné 63'; Fomba (yellow card) 67'	Report	Delort 79'	Stadium: Stade des Costières; Attendance: 0 Referee: Eric Wattellier

21 March 2021 30	Montpellier	3–1	Bordeaux	Montpellier
15:00 CET (UTC+1)	Sambia 35'; Laborde 58'; Mavididi 69'; Cozza (yellow card) 72'	Report	Hwang 28'; Seri (yellow card) 34'; Benito (yellow card) 90+2'	Stadium: Stade de la Mosson; Attendance: 0 Referee: Hakim Ben El Hadj

4 April 2021 31	Angers	1–1	Montpellier	Angers
13:00 CEST (UTC+2)	Capelle (yellow card) 49'; Bahoken 72'	Report	Sambia (yellow card) 30'; Mavididi 47'	Stadium: Stade Raymond Kopa; Attendance: 0 Referee: Florent Batta

10 April 2021 32	Montpellier	3–3	Marseille	Montpellier
21:00 CEST (UTC+2)	Delort 1'; Mollet (yellow card) 8'; Laborde 47', 90+2'; Ferri (yellow card) 76'	Report	Thauvin (yellow card) 40'; Milik 43'; Gueye 45+1'; Álvaro (yellow card) 54'; Ćaleta-Car (red card) 62'; Perrin 71'	Stadium: Stade de la Mosson; Attendance: 0 Referee: Jérôme Brisard

16 April 2021 33	Lille	1–1	Montpellier	Villeneuve-d'Ascq
21:00 CEST (UTC+2)	André (yellow card) 30'; Çelik (yellow card) 43'; Mandava (yellow card) 81'; Luiz Araújo 85'	Report	Mollet (yellow card) 14'; Delort 21'	Stadium: Stade Pierre-Mauroy; Attendance: 0 Referee: Benoît Millot

25 April 2021 34	Nice	3–1	Montpellier	Nice
13:00 CEST (UTC+2)	Boudaoui 6', (yellow card) 59'; Todibo 39'; Claude-Maurice 40'	Report	Laborde 3'; Mollet (yellow card) 56'; Wahi (yellow card) 66'	Stadium: Allianz Riviera; Attendance: 0 Referee: Bastien Dechepy

2 May 2021 35	Montpellier	1–2	Saint-Étienne	Montpellier
17:05 CEST (UTC+2)	Delort 6'; Benchama (yellow card) 80'; Dolly (yellow card) 90+1'	Report	Hamouma 16'; Gabriel Silva (yellow card) 47'; Debuchy 50'	Stadium: Stade de la Mosson; Attendance: 0 Referee: Karim Abed

9 May 2021 36	Strasbourg	2–3	Montpellier	Strasbourg
15:00 CEST (UTC+2)	Aholou (yellow card) 37'; Ajorque 69'; Djiku (yellow card) 90+1'; Zohi 90+4'	Report	Laborde 36', 49'; Le Tallec (yellow card) 43'; Delort 46'; Chotard (yellow card) 61'; Ristić (yellow card) 90+5'	Stadium: Stade de la Meinau; Attendance: 0 Referee: Jérôme Miguelgorry

16 May 2021 37	Montpellier	0–0	Brest	Montpellier
21:00 CEST (UTC+2)	Mollet (red card) 39'	Report	Mounié (yellow card) 42'; Belkebla (yellow card) 50'; Chardonnet (yellow card) 72'	Stadium: Stade de la Mosson; Attendance: 0 Referee: Aurélien Petit

23 May 2021 38	Nantes	1–2	Montpellier	Nantes
21:00 CEST (UTC+2)	Kolo Muani 33'; Coco (yellow card) 82'; Blas (yellow card) 90+1'	Report	Hilton (yellow card) 18'; Delort (penalty missed) 29', 76'; Laborde 30'; Souquet (yellow card) 45+1'	Stadium: Stade de la Beaujoire; Attendance: 0 Referee: Ruddy Buquet

=== Coupe de France ===
10 February 2021 Round of 64	Strasbourg	0–2	Montpellier	Strasbourg
14:45 CET (UTC+1)		Report	Delort 45+1'; Škuletić 88'	Stadium: Stade de la Meinau; Attendance: 0 Referee: Ruddy Buquet

6 March 2021 Round of 32	Olympique Alès	1–2	Montpellier	Alès
14:15 CET (UTC+1)	El Bakkal 22'; Mboup (yellow card) 81'	Report	Ferri 11'; Yun (yellow card) 38'; Laborde 84'	Stadium: Stade Pierre Pibarot; Attendance: 0 Referee: Jérémie Pignard

7 April 2021 Round of 16	Voltigeurs de Châteaubriant	0–1	Montpellier	Châteaubriant
18:45 CEST (UTC+2)	Mukoko (yellow card) 90+2'	Report	Mendes (yellow card) 41'; Mollet 61'	Stadium: Stade de la Ville en Bois; Attendance: 0 Referee: Ruddy Buquet

20 April 2021 Quarter-finals	Canet Roussillon FC	1–2	Montpellier	Perpignan
21:00 CEST (UTC+2)	Ouadoudi 25' (pen.), (yellow card) 62'; Lybohy (yellow card) 73'	Report	Hilton (red card) 23'; Sambia (yellow card) 58'; Delort 60', 84' (pen.); Ristić (yellow card) 72'	Stadium: Stade Gilbert Brutus; Attendance: 0 Referee: Mikael Lesage

12 May 2021 Semi-finals	Montpellier	2–2 (5–6 p)	Paris Saint-Germain	Montpellier
21:00 CEST (UTC+2)	Laborde 45'; Ferri (yellow card) 52'; Mollet (yellow card) 65'; Delort 83'; Savanier (yellow card) 89'	Report	Mbappé 10', 50'; Bakker (yellow card) 89'; Neymar (yellow card) 90'	Stadium: Stade de la Mosson; Attendance: 0 Referee: Jérémie Pignard
	Penalties
	Savanier (penalty scored); Delort (penalty scored); Mavididi (penalty scored); Ristić (penalty scored); Laborde (penalty scored); Sambia (penalty missed)		(penalty scored) Di María; (penalty scored) Draxler; (penalty scored) Paredes; (penalty scored) Marquinhos; (penalty scored) Neymar; (penalty scored) Kean

== Statistics ==
=== Appearances and goals ===
No.	Pos	Nat	Player	Total		Ligue 1		Coupe de France	
No.	Pos	Nat	Player	Apps	Goals	Apps	Goals	Apps	Goals
Goalkeepers
1	GK	(Switzerland) SUI	Jonas Omlin	31	0	31	0	0	0
16	GK	(France) FRA	Dimitry Bertaud	12	0	7	0	5	0
30	GK	(France) FRA	Mathis Carvalho	0	0	0	0	0	0
Defenders
2	DF	(France) FRA	Arnaud Souquet	27	1	14+9	1	4	0
3	DF	(France) FRA	Daniel Congré	43	2	38	2	4+1	0
4	DF	(Brazil) BRA	Hilton	33	0	24+5	0	4	0
5	DF	(Portugal) POR	Pedro Mendes	24	2	19+3	2	2	0
7	DF	(Serbia) SRB	Mihailo Ristić	37	0	26+8	0	2+1	0
27	DF	(France) FRA	Clément Vidal	2	0	1+1	0	0	0
31	DF	(France) FRA	Nicolas Cozza	23	0	15+5	0	3	0
	DF	(Uruguay) URU	Mathías Suárez	0	0	0	0	0	0
Midfielders
6	MF	(France) FRA	Junior Sambia	41	1	26+10	1	2+3	0
11	MF	(France) FRA	Téji Savanier	31	5	26+1	5	2+2	0
12	MF	(France) FRA	Jordan Ferri	38	0	31+3	0	4	0
13	MF	(France) FRA	Joris Chotard	33	0	11+18	0	2+2	0
14	MF	(France) FRA	Damien Le Tallec	27	0	13+10	0	2+2	0
20	MF	(South Africa) RSA	Keagan Dolly	21	0	3+15	0	1+2	0
25	MF	(France) FRA	Florent Mollet	39	3	30+4	3	4+1	0
26	MF	(France) FRA	Samy Benchama	5	0	0+5	0	0	0
33	MF	(France) FRA	Sacha Delaye	1	0	0+1	0	0	0
Forwards
9	FW	(Algeria) ALG	Andy Delort	34	15	30	15	4	0
10	FW	(France) FRA	Gaëtan Laborde	43	16	38	16	3+2	0
18	FW	(France) FRA	Yanis Ammour	0	0	0	0	0	0
19	FW	(England) ENG	Stephy Mavididi	40	9	23+12	9	3+2	0
21	FW	(France) FRA	Elye Wahi	22	3	3+15	3	2+2	0
24	FW	(South Korea) KOR	Yun Il-lok	13	0	3+9	0	1	0
28	FW	(Republic of the Congo) CGO	Béni Makouana	0	0	0	0	0	0
32	FW	(Serbia) SRB	Petar Škuletić	24	2	19+1	2	1+3	0
Players transferred out during the season
8	DF	(Cameroon) CMR	Ambroise Oyongo	13	1	5+8	1	0	0

Last updated: 23 May 2021
Source: Competitions

=== Goalscorers ===
As of 15 January 2021

Rank	No.	Pos	Nat	Name	Ligue 1	Coupe de France	Total
1	9	FW	(Algeria)	Andy Delort	9	0	9
2	10	FW	(France)	Gaëtan Laborde	6	0	6
3	19	FW	(England)	Stephy Mavididi	4	0	4
4	11	MF	(France)	Téji Savanier	3	0	3
4	25	MF	(France)	Florent Mollet	3	0	3
6	3	DF	(France)	Daniel Congré	2	0	2
6	5	DF	(Portugal)	Pedro Mendes	2	0	2
8	2	DF	(France)	Arnaud Souquet	1	0	1
8	8	DF	(Cameroon)	Ambroise Oyongo	1	0	1
8	32	FW	(Serbia)	Petar Škuletić	1	0	1
8	33	FW	(France)	Elye Wahi	1	0	1
Totals					33	0	33
