= Andy Delort =

Footballer (born 1991)

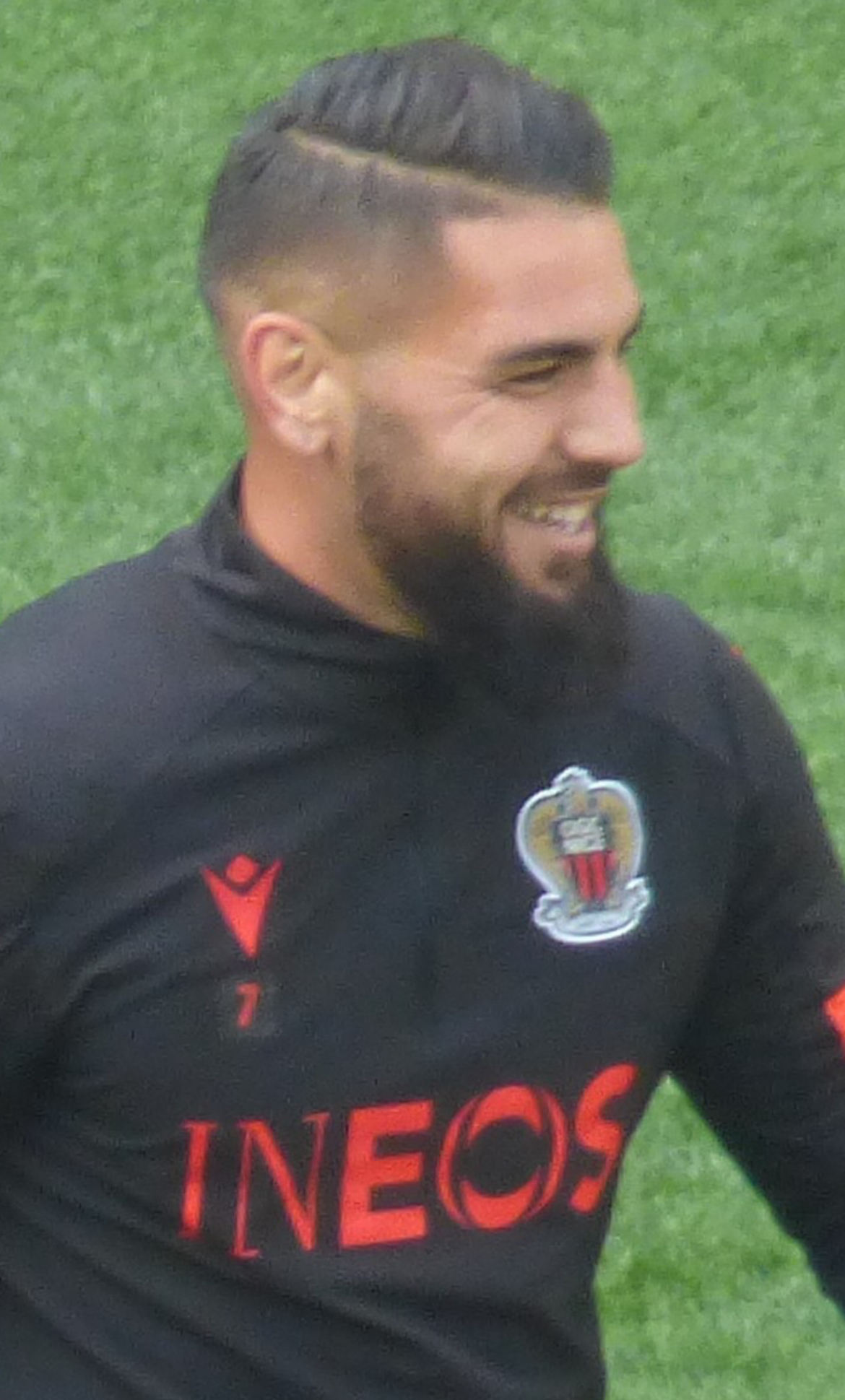
- Delort with Nice in 2022

Personal information
- Full name: Andy Delort
- Date of birth: 9 October 1991 (age 35)
- Place of birth: Sète, France
- Height: 1.81 m (5 ft 11 in)
- Position: Striker

Team information
- Current team: Ajaccio
- Number: 9

Youth career
- 1997–1999: Sète
- 1999–2000: Pointe Courte AC Sète
- 2000–2002: Sète
- 2002–2003: Pointe Courte AC Sète
- 2003–2008: Sète

Senior career*
Years	Team	Apps	(Gls)
2008–2009	Ajaccio	0	(0)
2009–2010	Nîmes	3	(0)
2010–2013	Ajaccio	47	(5)
2012	→ Metz (loan)	13	(1)
2013–2014	Tours	38	(24)
2014–2015	Wigan Athletic	11	(0)
2015	→ Tours (loan)	14	(2)
2015–2016	Caen	36	(12)
2016–2017	Tigres UANL	14	(3)
2017–2019	Toulouse	47	(10)
2018–2019	→ Montpellier (loan)	36	(14)
2019–2021	Montpellier	59	(26)
2021–2023	Nice	46	(22)
2023	→ Nantes (loan)	12	(0)
2023–2024	Umm Salal	12	(5)
2024–2025	MC Alger	10	(3)
2025	→ Montpellier (loan)	9	(0)
2025–	Ajaccio	14	(10)

International career^{‡}
2009	France (beach)	1	(5)
2011	France U20	1	(0)
2019–2023	Algeria	15	(2)
Medal record
Men's football
Representing Algeria
Africa Cup of Nations
Winner	2019 Egypt
- * Club domestic league appearances and goals as of 08 November 2026 ‡ National team caps and goals as of 4 November 2023

Andy Delort (Arabic: أندي ديلور; born 9 October 1991) is a professional footballer who plays as a striker for Régional 1 club Ajaccio.

Born in France, Delort was a France under-20 youth international before representing Algeria at senior level. He has also played for the France beach soccer team.

== Club career ==
=== Early career ===
Delort was born in Sète, France, to a father of Romani descent, and a mother of Algerian descent. He started his career at Sète. He joined Ajaccio in 2008, having finished top scorer at France U19 league level with 30 goals. After coming through Ajaccio's youth ranks, he attracted interest from Bordeaux and Borussia Dortmund. After enjoying a trial at Borussia Dortmund, playing in the reserve team with Mario Götze and Shinji Kagawa, Dortmund offered him a contract. However, he chose to join Nîmes because of manager Jean-Michel Cavalli, claiming "a player who leapfrogs, burns his wings".

Delort played his first game of Ligue 2 for Nîmes on 30 August 2009, coming on as a 53rd-minute substitute against Metz. During the season, he was rarely used in the first team making only three substitute appearances.

=== Ajaccio and loan to Metz ===
Delort re-joined his original club, AC Ajaccio, in June 2010. He scored his first two goals at professional level on 15 September 2010 against Le Havre in the French League Cup, before achieving his first goals in the Coupe de France on 12 November 2010. His first Ligue 2 goals contributed to victories against Angers on 17 December 2010 and against Istres. He signed his first professional contract for three and a half years with AC Ajaccio on 28 January 2011. On 11 March 2011, he was one of the players involved in a mass brawl when he was replaced in the match against Nantes. As a result of the incident, several players were given suspensions; both Delort and his teammate Carl Medjani received four-match bans. He earned promotion to Ligue 1 with AC Ajaccio during the 2010–11 season, after finishing 2nd in the league.

On 31 January 2012, Delort signed a six-month loan deal with Ligue 2 club Metz, where he scored 1 goal in 13 appearances.

He returned to AC Ajaccio for the 2012–13 season, and scored his first goal in Ligue 1 on 27 April 2013 in a 2–1 win over Montpellier. In that season, he made 16 appearances in Ligue 1. In the same season, he scored 12 goals in 16 appearances for the club's reserve team.

=== Tours ===
In the summer of 2013, Delort joined Ligue 2 side Tours. He finished the 2013–14 season as joint top scorer in Ligue 2, scoring 24 goals in 36 matches and was named in the Ligue 2 Team of the Year, as well as receiving a nomination for the Ligue 2 Player of the Year, eventually finishing runner-up to Metz's Diafra Sakho for the award.

=== Wigan Athletic ===
On deadline day of the summer 2014 transfer window, Delort signed for Championship side Wigan Athletic for a fee reported to be under £3 million. He was given the number 49 shirt. Delort struggled at Wigan and amassed only 11 league appearances for the club, failing to score in any of them. In an interview with Hat Trick, he admitted that he had struggled to settle at Wigan following his sudden upheaval from France.

==== Return to Tours on loan ====
Having not been able to settle well in England, Delort re-joined Tours on loan until the end of the season on transfer deadline day in the summer of 2015. In doing so, he opted to take a 50% pay cut in order to obtain regular playing time again.

=== Caen ===
Delort completed a transfer to Caen on 2 July 2015. In his debut with Caen, he scored his first goal in a 1–0 defeat of Marseille on 8 August 2015. At the start of the following season, Delort refused to attend training during a protracted transfer saga with Liga MX side Tigres UANL.

=== Tigres UANL ===
On 2 September 2016, Delort's transfer to Tigres was officially announced becoming the second French player to join the team after André-Pierre Gignac. He signed a four-year contract while the transfer fee paid to Caen was reported as €8 million. On 22 October 2016, he scored his first goal in Liga MX with Tigres, against UNAM at the Estadio Olímpico Universitario in a 3–1 victory. He spent less than six months at the club, however, scoring 3 goals in 14 appearances, before returning to France to join Toulouse.

=== Toulouse ===
On 26 January 2017, Delort returned to France, joining Toulouse on a reported four-year contract and for a reported transfer fee of €6 million. He scored on his debut for the club on 2 February, netting the opening goal in a 4–0 win over Angers, and repeated the feat in his next two appearances against Lorient and Bastia.

=== Montpellier ===
On 24 July 2018, Delort was loaned to Montpellier until the end of the 2018–19 season with an option to buy. On 12 June 2019, Delort signed permanently with Montpellier. There, he scored a total of 41 goals across all competitions, beating Olivier Giroud's record and became the 3rd best striker of Montpellier in the 21st century.

=== Nice ===
On 28 August 2021, Delort signed with fellow Ligue 1 side Nice on a 4-year deal. On 21 May 2022, he scored his first Ligue 1 hat-trick in a 3–2 victory over Reims.

=== Nantes ===
On 30 January 2023, Delort moved to fellow French club Nantes, initially on a six-month loan with an obligation to buy. He scored his first two goals with Nantes during a Coupe de France quarter finals against RC Lens on 1 March 2023.

=== Umm Salal ===
On 7 July 2023, Delort officially signed for Qatari club Umm Salal on a two-year contract with an option for a one-year extension. The transfer fee of the deal was estimated to be €2.5 million. On 12 February 2024, he terminated his contract with Umm Salal.

=== MC Alger ===
On 11 September 2024, Delort signed with Algerian club MC Alger on a two-year contract with an option for a one-year extension.

==== Return to Montpellier on loan ====
On 29 January 2025, Delort returned to Montpellier on loan until the end of the 2024–25 season with an option to buy.

=== Return to Ajaccio ===
On 10 September 2025, Delort signed for his former club Ajaccio, helping the club after their administrative relegation to the seventh tier of French football.

== International career ==
Delort played in the beach soccer team managed by Eric Cantona in 2009. During an amateur tournament in Sète, he was spotted by Laurent Castro, who asked him to play in the qualification for the 2009 World Cup. He scored five goals in the qualifiers.

In 2011, he was selected by France Under 20s team by Francis Smerecki to play against the United States on 17 May 2011. He was then called to participate in the 2011 Toulon Tournament in June with the France team, but had to pull out of the squad having suffered an injury in a league game.

Of Algerian nationality through his mother, Delort expressed an interest in representing the Algeria national football team in April 2019.

On 13 June 2019, the Algerian federation announced Delort's inclusion in its final squad for the 2019 Africa Cup of Nations. He made his debut three days later in a friendly against Mali, coming on as a substitute for Yacine Brahimi in the 75th minute and scoring the winning goal 5 minutes later in a 3–2 victory.

In October 2021, Delort was not called up to the national team for the recent World Cup qualifiers. Coach Djamel Belmadi revealed at a press conference that Delort himself refused the call-up because he wanted to concentrate on his club career, having recently signed with OGC Nice. Delort confirmed this and said he wanted to take a break from the national team for a year.

== Personal life ==
Delort has two children, a son and a daughter. In January 2021, he received the medal of his hometown, Sète from the hands of the mayor François Commeinhes.

== Career statistics ==
=== Club ===
As of match played 6 April 2025

Appearances and goals by club, season and competition
Club	Season	League			National cup		League cup		Continental		Total	
Club	Season	Division	Apps	Goals	Apps	Goals	Apps	Goals	Apps	Goals	Apps	Goals
Ajaccio	2010–11	Ligue 2	24	4	1	0	4	2	—		29	6
Ajaccio	2011–12	Ligue 1	7	0	2	0	0	0	—		9	0
Ajaccio	2012–13	Ligue 1	16	1	1	0	1	0	—		18	1
Ajaccio	Total		47	5	4	0	5	2	—		56	7
Metz (loan)	2011–12	Ligue 2	13	1	0	0	0	0	—		13	1
Tours	2013–14	Ligue 2	36	24	0	0	3	1	—		39	25
Tours	2014–15	Ligue 2	2	0	0	0	0	0	—		2	0
Tours	Total		38	24	0	0	3	1	—		41	25
Wigan Athletic	2014–15	Championship	11	0	0	0	0	0	—		11	0
Tours (loan)	2014–15	Ligue 2	14	2	0	0	0	0	—		14	2
Caen	2015–16	Ligue 1	36	12	1	0	1	1	—		38	13
Tigres UANL	2016–17	Liga MX	14	3	0	0	—		2 (Note: Appearances in CONCACAF Champions League)	1	16	4
Toulouse	2016–17	Ligue 1	15	5	0	0	0	0	—		15	5
Toulouse	2017–18	Ligue 1	32	5	2	0	2	0	—		36	5
Toulouse	Total		47	10	2	0	2	0	—		51	10
Montpellier (loan)	2018–19	Ligue 1	36	14	1	0	1	0	—		38	14
Montpellier	2019–20	Ligue 1	26	9	3	2	2	1	—		31	12
Montpellier	2020–21	Ligue 1	30	15	4	4	—		—		34	19
Montpellier	2021–22	Ligue 1	3	2	0	0	—		—		3	2
Montpellier	Total		95	40	8	6	3	1	—		106	47
Nice	2021–22	Ligue 1	32	16	5	2	—		—		37	18
Nice	2022–23	Ligue 1	14	6	0	0	—		4 (Note: Appearances in UEFA Europa Conference League)	1	18	7
Nice	Total		46	22	5	2	—		4	1	55	25
Nantes (loan)	2022–23	Ligue 1	12	0	4	2	—		1 (Note: Appearance in UEFA Europa League)	0	17	2
Umm Salal	2023–24	Qatar Stars League	12	5	0	0	7	8	—		19	13
MC Alger	2024–25	Algerian Ligue 1	10	3	0	0	—		5 (Note: Appearances in CAF Champions League)	0	15	3
Montpellier (loan)	2024–25	Ligue 1	9	0	—		—		—		9	0
Ajaccio	2025–26	Régional 2 Corsica					—		—			
Career total			390	125	24	10	21	13	12	2	447	150

=== International ===
As of match played 27 March 2023

Appearances and goals by national team and year
National team	Year	Apps	Goals
Algeria	2019	7	1
Algeria	2020	3	1
Algeria	2021	1	0
Algeria	2022	2	0
Algeria	2023	2	0
Total		15	2

Scores and results list Algeria's goal tally first.

List of international goals scored by Andy Delort
No.	Date	Venue	Opponent	Score	Result	Competition
1.	16 June 2019	Jassim bin Hamad Stadium, Doha, Qatar	Mali	3–2	3–2	Friendly
2.	16 November 2020	National Sports Stadium, Harare, Zimbabwe	Zimbabwe	1–0	2–2	2021 Africa Cup of Nations qualification

== Honours ==
Tigres UANL

- Liga MX: Apertura 2016

Nice

- Coupe de France runner-up: 2021–22

Ajaccio

- Régional 2 Corsica: 2025–26

Algeria

- Africa Cup of Nations: 2019

Individual

- Ligue 2 top goalscorer: 2013–14; 24 goals
- UNFP Ligue 2 Team of the Year: 2013–14
- UNFP Ligue 2 Player of the Month: March 2014
- UNFP Ligue 1 Player of the Month: November 2020
