= Fabien Dagneaux =

French football manager

Fabian Dagneaux
Personal information
- Date of birth: 25 October 1972 (age 54)
- Place of birth: Boulogne-sur-Mer, France

Team information
- Current team: Boulogne (manager)

Managerial career
- Years: Team
- 2011–2016: Stade Portelois
- 2017–2023: Boulogne B
- 2023–: Boulogne

Fabien Dagneaux (born 25 October 1972) is a French football manager. He is the current manager of Ligue 2 club Boulogne. Hired in February 2023 with the team at risk of relegation to Championnat National 3, he led them to Ligue 2 in 2025 via two consecutive promotions.

== Career ==
Born in Boulogne-sur-Mer, Dagneaux was manager of US Boulogne's reserve team, who played for several seasons in the Championnat National 3 (fifth tier of French football). On 8 February 2023, Christophe Raymond was sacked from the first team, who were bottom of the Championnat National 2; Dagneaux was installed as his replacement with Antony Lecointe as his assistant. He won 3–2 away to Metz reserves on his debut three days later and ended the season with safety from a second consecutive relegation.

In 2023–24, Boulogne won promotion to the Championnat National as champions, and Dagneaux's contract was extended. He had previously been a sports instructor employed by the council of Desvres.

Boulogne came third in the 2024–25 Championnat National, qualifying for a promotion playoff against Clermont of Ligue 2. Despite a 4–3 aggregate loss, they were promoted due to the disqualification of Ajaccio from the league above, reaching the professional leagues for the first time in 13 years. On his debut in the competition on 15 August, his team lost 1–0 away to Nancy.
