= Brandon Deville =

Belgian footballer

Personal information
- Full name: Brandon Deville
- Date of birth: 17 February 1993 (age 33)
- Place of birth: Verviers, Belgium
- Height: 1.70 m (5 ft 7 in)
- Position: Defensive midfielder

Team information
- Current team: Étoile Elsautoise
- Number: 7

Youth career
- –2011: Anderlecht

Senior career*
Years	Team	Apps	(Gls)
2012–2015	Ajaccio	3	(0)
2014	→ Westerlo (loan)	8	(0)
2015–2016	Lommel United	20	(0)
2016–2019	RFC Seraing	74	(8)
2019–	Sporting Hasselt	7	(1)
- * Club domestic league appearances and goals as of 18:48, 23 October 2019 (UTC)

Brandon Deville (born 17 February 1993) is a Belgian footballer who plays for Etoile Elsautoise. He plays as a Left midfielder.

== Career ==
Deville was born in Verviers, Belgium.

On 27 June 2012, Deville signed a two-year contract for French side AC Ajaccio. He left the youth ranks from R.S.C. Anderlecht for a professional career at Corsica. However, he didn't make any appearance during the 2012–13 season. He made his Ligue 1 debut on 25 August 2013 for AC Ajaccio at home to OGC Nice. He replaced Chahir Belghazouani after 71 minutes in a 0–0 draw at Stade François Coty.

At the end of his contract with AC Ajaccio, Deville signed with Lommel United in June 2015.

Ahead of the 2019–20 season, Deville joined Sporting Hasselt.
