= Jody Viviani =

French footballer (born 1982)

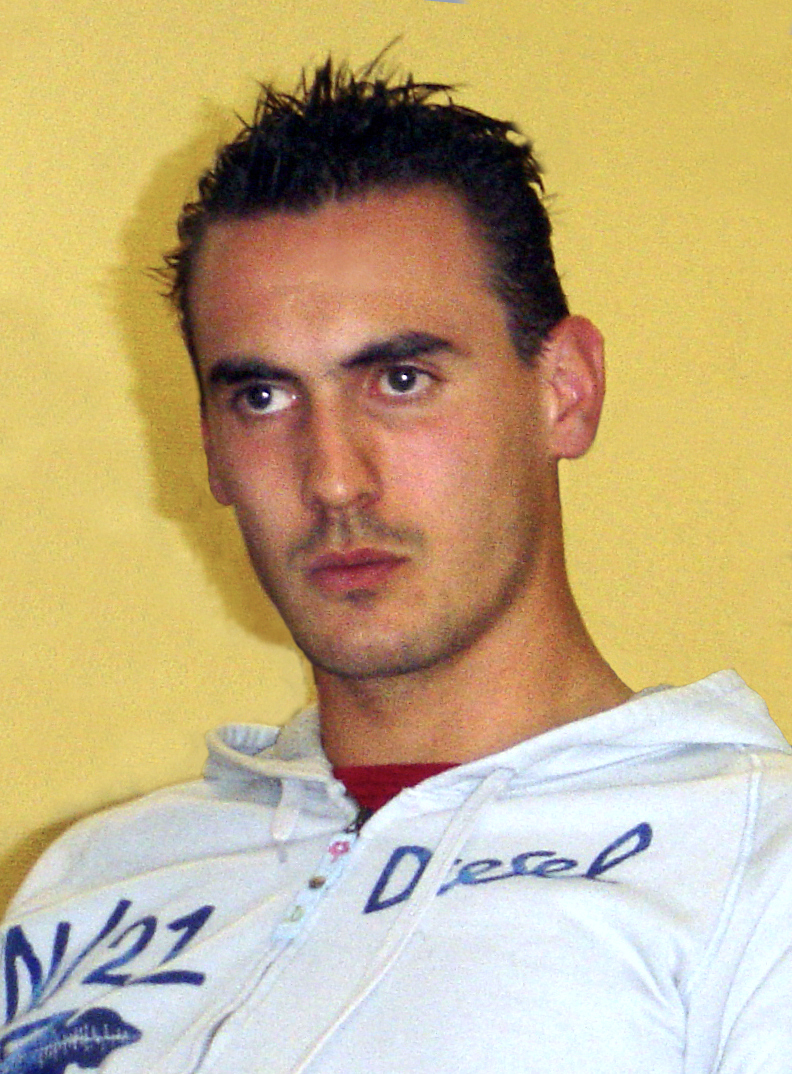
- Viviani in 2006

Personal information
- Date of birth: 25 January 1982 (age 44)
- Place of birth: La Ciotat, France
- Height: 1.89 m (6 ft 2 in)
- Position: Goalkeeper

Youth career
- 1998–2002: Montpellier HSC

Senior career*
Years	Team	Apps	(Gls)
1998–2005	Montpellier	38	(0)
2005–2009	Saint-Étienne	32	(0)
2009–2011	Grenoble	56	(0)
2011–2013	Xanthi	32	(0)
2013–2014	RWS Bruxelles	16	(0)
2014–2015	Boulogne	18	(0)
2015–2020	Toulon	89	(0)
Total		281	(0)
- * Club domestic league appearances and goals

Jody Viviani (born 25 January 1982) is a French former professional footballer who played as a goalkeeper.

== Career ==
Viviani began playing football in the youth system of Montpellier HSC. He made his professional debut with Montpellier before moving to Saint-Étienne and Grenoble. Viviani had a two-year spell in Greece with Skoda Xanthi before returning to France in 2013.
