= Daniel Langrand =

French footballer (1921–1998)

Personal information
- Date of birth: 7 October 1921
- Place of birth: Tourcoing, France
- Date of death: 15 December 1998 (aged 77)
- Position: Goalkeeper

Senior career*
| Years | Team | Apps | (Gls) |
| 1944–1947 | Olympique avignonnais | | |

Managerial career
- 1954–1964: AS Aulnoye-Aymeries
- 1964–1966: DC Bruxelles
- 1966–1969: Lille
- 1969–1973: Boulogne
- 1975–1979: Boulogne
- * Club domestic league appearances and goals

Daniel Pierre Langrand (7 October 1921 – 15 December 1998) was a French football player and coach.

He was born in Tourcoing, Nord, in October 1921. Langrand was goalkeeper for Olympique avignonnais, after World War II, and later became a coach.

He began his career in Belgium with SC Boussu-Bois before joining AA La Louvière. In 1954, he joined AS Aulnoye-Aymeries. He spent ten years at the avesnois club, before continuing his professional adventure at Daring Club de Bruxelles, in 1964.

Between April 1966 and 1969, he trained Lille OSC. After that, he managed the players of USG Boulogne until 1979.
