= Antony Lecointe =

French footballer (born 1980)

Personal information
- Date of birth: 5 October 1980 (age 46)
- Place of birth: Boulogne-sur-Mer, France
- Height: 1.70 m (5 ft 7 in)
- Position: Defender

Team information
- Current team: Boulogne (manager)

Senior career*
Years	Team	Apps	(Gls)
2003–2012	Boulogne	177	(1)
2012–2015	Dunkerque	67	(0)
2015–2020	Stade Portelois		

Managerial career
- 2023–2024: Boulogne (assistant)
- * Club domestic league appearances and goals

Antony Lecointe (French pronunciation: [ɑ̃tɔni ləkwɛ̃t]; born 5 October 1980) is a French former football defender. He spent most of his career at his town club US Boulogne, where he was later assistant manager.
