= Sébastien Puygrenier =

French footballer (born 1982)

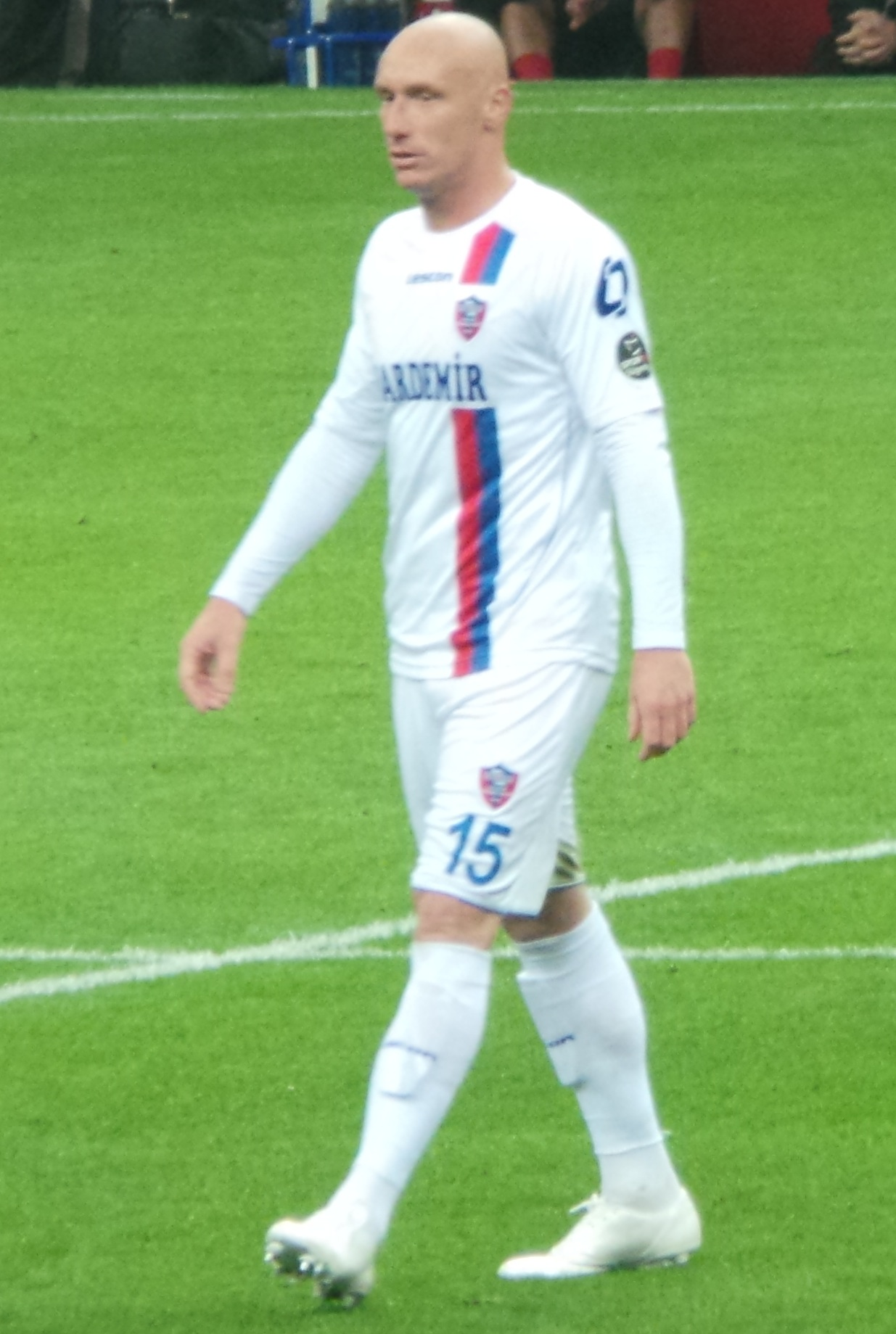
- Puygrenier in 2013

Personal information
- Full name: Sébastien Nicolas Puygrenier
- Date of birth: 28 January 1982 (age 44)
- Place of birth: Limoges, France
- Height: 1.87 m (6 ft 2 in)
- Position: Centre-back

Team information
- Current team: Auxerre B (Manager)

Youth career
- Rennes

Senior career*
| Years | Team | Apps | (Gls) |
| 2001–2003 | Rennes | 3 | (0) |
| 2003–2005 | → Nancy (loan) | 47 | (0) |
| 2005–2008 | Nancy | 95 | (10) |
| 2008–2011 | Zenit Saint Petersburg | 9 | (1) |
| 2009 | → Bolton Wanderers (loan) | 7 | (1) |
| 2009–2011 | → Monaco (loan) | 67 | (3) |
| 2012–2013 | Nancy | 54 | (9) |
| 2013–2014 | Karabükspor | 8 | (0) |
| 2014–2016 | Auxerre | 75 | (7) |
| 2016–2018 | Créteil | 38 | (6) |
| Total | | 403 | (37) |

Managerial career
- 2018–2024: Auxerre B (assistant)
- 2024–: Auxerre B
- * Club domestic league appearances and goals

Sébastien Nicolas Puygrenier (born 28 January 1982) is a French retired professional footballer who played as a centre-back and current manager of AJ Auxerre's B-team.

== Career ==
=== France ===
Born in Limoges, Puygrenier began his career at Stade Rennais, Puygrenier made his Ligue 1 debut in the 4–1 defeat at Lyon in 2003. He started the next two matches, but these were to be his last games for the club before joining Nancy on loan for the 2003–04 season.

After playing 27 games in Ligue 2 that season, Puygrenier spent a further season on loan at Nancy, with 20 appearances as the club won promotion. League rules prevented him from staying on loan at a rival Ligue 1 club so he was signed permanently in 2005. Puygrenier scored his only league goal to date on 28 August in the 6–0 win over his old club. He also scored Nancy's opener in the 3–0 win over Feyenoord in the UEFA Cup. He was voted Fans' Player of the Year for 2006–07, and named in the Ligue 1 2007–08 team of the year the following season, where he helped Nancy stay unexpectedly in the top 3 for most of the season.

=== Zenit Saint Petersburg ===
On 31 July 2008, he signed a four-year contract with Zenit Saint Petersburg. He took part in the team's victory in the 2008 UEFA Super Cup, but struggled to hold down a regular first-team berth. As Portuguese centre-halves Bruno Alves and Fernando Meira joined the club, it became increasingly evident that Puygrenier's future lay outside of Saint Petersburg, and a string of loan deals followed - firstly to Bolton Wanderers and then two spells at AS Monaco in Ligue 1. After failing to impress in France, Monaco declined the option to recruit Puygrenier permanently, and he returned to Zenit who made it known that he was instantly available for transfer, even being described as 'definitely a mistake of our scouts' by general director Maxim Mitrofanov, who also criticised the defender for refusing to lower his wage demands in order to engineer a move away from the club despite having no prospects of achieving any playing time and not being considered a part of the Zenit squad by manager Luciano Spalletti.

=== Loan to Bolton Wanderers ===
In January 2009, he joined Bolton Wanderers on loan for the rest of the season. His one goal for Bolton came on 31 January, in a 3–2 home victory over Tottenham Hotspur. It was Bolton's 4000th goal in the top division of English football.

=== Loan to Monaco ===
On 14 July 2009, Puygrenier agreed to a loan deal to AS Monaco.

=== Nancy ===
Puygrenier moved to AS Nancy midway through the 2011–2012 league campaign.

=== Karabükspor ===
He signed for Turkish team Kardemir Karabükspor in July 2013, agreeing to a two-year deal.

=== Auxerre ===
In July 2014 he signed a one-year contract with French team AJ Auxerre.

=== Créteil ===
In July 2016, Puygrenier joined Championnat National side Créteil on a one-year contract with the option of second.

== Coaching career ==
After retiring in 2018, Puygrenier was appointed assistant coach of his former club AJ Auxerre's reserve team, working under manager David Carré. After six years as assistant coach, he was promoted to head coach of the reserve team in June 2024.

== Honours ==
Nancy

- Coupe de la Ligue: 2005–06
