= Stade de la Libération =

Stadium in Boulogne-sur-Mer, France

Coordinates: 50°43′25″N 1°37′10″E

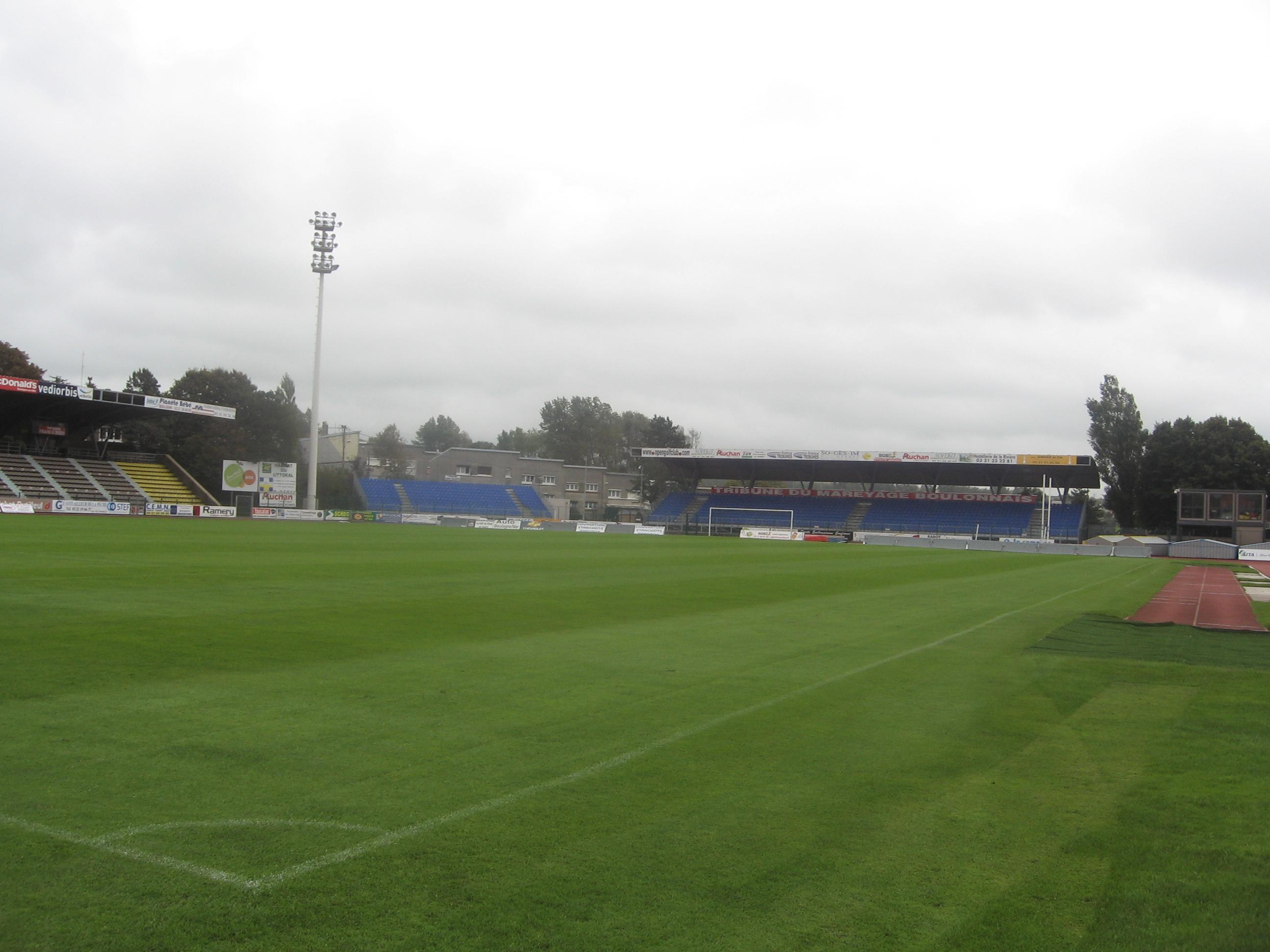
- Interactive map of Stade de la Libération
- Full name: Stade de la libération
- Location: Boulevard Eurvin 62200 Boulogne-sur-mer
- Owner: Ville de Boulogne-sur-Mer
- Capacity: 6,600; 8,700 (2007); 15,004 (2009); 9,534 (2021)
- Surface: Grass

Construction
- Groundbreaking: October, 1949
- Built: August 15, 1952
- Opened: June 1, 1956
- Renovated: 2006
- Expanded: 2007 ; 2009
- Architect: Albert Bonne

Tenant
- US Boulogne

Stade de la Libération (French pronunciation: [stad də la libeʁɑsjɔ̃]) is a multi-use stadium in Boulogne-sur-Mer, France. It is currently used mostly for football matches and is the home stadium of US Boulogne. The stadium was renovated in 2007, and its capacity increased to 15,034; the official record attendance is 15,242.

As a result of war damage, the team had to play on a sloping field for several years, and for a time the club reverted to amateur status. The stadium, being begun in 1949, was completed in 1952., and significantly expanded in 2007. The stadium also houses an athletics track, which was renewed in 2024.
