= Sigamary Diarra =

Malian-French footballer (born 1984)

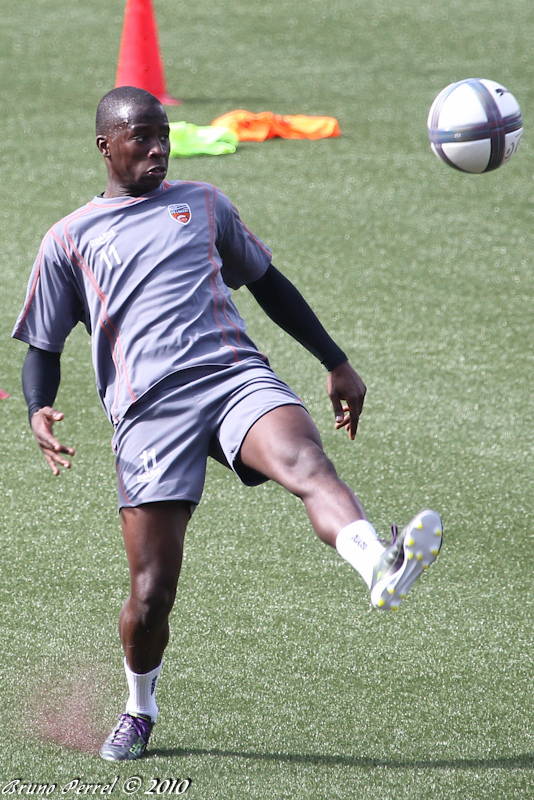

Personal information
- Date of birth: 10 January 1984 (age 42)
- Place of birth: Villepinte, France
- Height: 1.74 m (5 ft 9 in)
- Position: Midfielder

Youth career
- 2000–2002: Caen

Senior career*
Years	Team	Apps	(Gls)
2002–2003	Caen	23	(2)
2003–2005	Sochaux	6	(0)
2005–2007	Laval	57	(1)
2007–2009	Tours	71	(6)
2009–2012	Lorient	79	(7)
2012–2014	Ajaccio	54	(2)
2014–2018	Valenciennes	82	(5)

International career
2004–2014	Mali	22	(1)
Medal record
Men's football
Representing Mali
Africa Cup of Nations
Third place	2013 South Africa
- * Club domestic league appearances and goals

Sigamary Diarra (born 10 January 1984) is a retired Malian footballer who played as a midfielder.

== Career ==
Diarra was born in Villepinte. Having started out at Caen in 2002–03, he took his first professional contract at Sochaux, where he received opportunities to play in Ligue 1 and the UEFA Cup. After two years there, he returned to Ligue 2 with Laval, who promptly were relegated to the National.

In 2007, he signed for Tours, where he plays alongside Mali team mate, David Coulibaly and left on 27 June 2009 the club to sign with FC Lorient.

On 3 July 2012, Diarra moved to AC Ajaccio on a two-year deal.

In May 2019 Diarra announced, that he had retired from football after having been without club since his departure from Valenciennes in the summer 2018.

== Honours ==
Mali

- Africa Cup of Nations bronze: 2013
