= Chahir Belghazouani =

Footballer (born 1986)

Personal information
- Date of birth: 6 October 1986 (age 40)
- Place of birth: Porto-Vecchio, France
- Height: 1.80 m (5 ft 11 in)
- Position: Midfielder

Youth career
- 2002–2003: Toulon
- 2002–2003: Grenoble

Senior career*
Years	Team	Apps	(Gls)
2004–2007	Grenoble	51	(1)
2007–2012	Dynamo Kyiv	0	(0)
2008	→ Strasbourg (loan)	10	(1)
2009	→ Neuchâtel Xamax (loan)	6	(1)
2009–2010	→ Tours (loan)	28	(3)
2012	Zulte Waregem	9	(0)
2012–2014	Ajaccio	37	(6)
2013	Ajaccio B	2	(3)
2014	→ RWS Bruxelles (loan)	9	(1)
2014–2015	Brest	25	(2)
2015–2018	Levadiakos	25	(0)
2019	Blue Boys Muhlenbach	12	(4)
2020	USAG Uckange		

International career
2004	Morocco U17	1	(0)
2005–2006	France U20	2	(0)
2006–2007	France U21	3	(0)
2012–2013	Morocco	8	(0)

Managerial career
- 2020: Blue Boys Muhlenbach (sporting director)
- * Club domestic league appearances and goals

Chakhir Belghazouani (born 6 October 1986 in Porto-Vecchio) is a former professional footballer who played as a midfielder. Born in France, he played for the Morocco U17 national team and the France U20 and France U21 national teams at youth international level before making eight appearances for the Morocco senior national team.

== Club career ==
Belghazouani began his career with Grenoble Foot 38 and in 2005 was promoted to the first team. After two years in Ligue 2 with Grenoble, he joined top Ukrainian club Dynamo Kyiv for €800,000, where he played in three games, scoring a goal on his debut. He left on loan for RC Strasbourg on 20 June 2008 returning to Ukraine on 1 November. On 16 February 2009, Belghazouani moved to Neuchâtel Xamax on loan from Dynamo Kyiv until 30 June 2009 and then on 16 July 2009 he was loaned to Tours FC.

On 15 July 2012, Belghazouani moved from Belgian S.V. Zulte Waregem to Ligue 1 team AC Ajaccio on a three-year contract. He was loaned to R. White Star Bruxelles in January 2014.

On 10 June 2014, Ligue 2 side Brest announced the signature of Belghazouani with a two-year contract. On 11 September 2015, Belghazouani signed for Super League Greece club Levadiakos for an undisclosed fee.

Belghazouani joined Blue Boys Muhlenbach in the Luxembourg Division of Honour on 23 January 2019 on a contract until June 2020.

== International career ==
Belghazouani played for the Morocco Under 17s, then at the U-20 and U-21 level for France including in the 2006 Toulon Tournament.

== Managerial and later career ==
At the end of September 2019, 32-year old Belghazouani decided to retire. After bringing two players to FC Blue Boys Muhlenbach during the winter transfer market 2019–20, respectively Arnaud Guedj and Mamadou Samassa, Muhlenbach hired him as sporting director in February 2020.
