= Samuel Bouhours =

French professional footballer (born 1987)

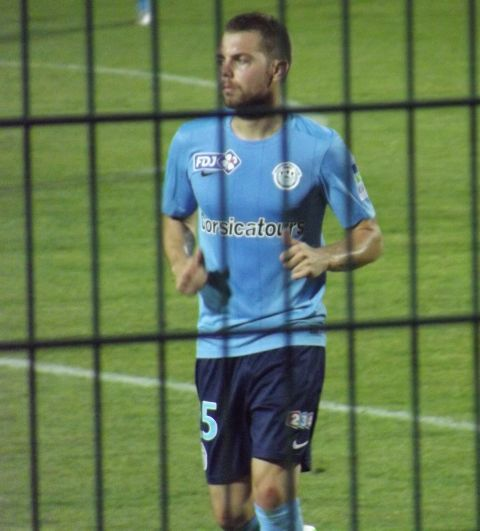

Personal information
- Date of birth: 26 June 1987 (age 39)
- Place of birth: Le Mans, France
- Height: 1.82 m (6 ft 0 in)
- Position: Defender

Senior career*
Years	Team	Apps	(Gls)
2007–2011	Le Mans	60	(0)
2011–2013	Ajaccio	54	(0)
2013–2016	Tours	94	(0)
2016–2018	Reims	40	(1)
2016–2017	Reims II	7	(0)
2018–2019	Laval	7	(0)
- * Club domestic league appearances and goals as of 12:43, 30 September 2019 (UTC)

Samuel Bouhours (born 26 June 1987) is a French professional footballer who plays as a defender.

== Professional career ==
Bouhours helped Stade de Reims win the 2017–18 Ligue 2, helping promote them to the Ligue 1 for the 2018–19 season. On 15 October 2018, Bouhours joined Championnat National side Laval on a free transfer.

== Honours ==
Reims

- Ligue 2: 2017–18
