= US Boulogne =

French football club, based in Boulogne-sur-Mer

Boulogne
- Full name: Union Sportive Boulogne Côte d'Opale
- Short name: USBCO
- Founded: 1898; 128 years ago
- Stadium: Stade de la Libération
- Capacity: 9,534
- President: Vincent Boutillier
- Head coach: Fabien Dagneaux
- League: Ligue 2
- 2025–26: Ligue 2, 15th of 18
- Website: www.usbco.com
Home colours	Away colours

Union Sportive Boulogne Côte d'Opale (French pronunciation: [ynjɔ̃ spɔʁtiv bulɔɲ kot dɔpal]; commonly referred to as US Boulogne, USBCO (French pronunciation: [y.ɛs.be.se.o]) or frequently, simply Boulogne) is a French association football club based in the commune of Boulogne-sur-Mer. The club was founded in 1898 and currently plays in Ligue 2, the second level of French football, having been promoted from the Championnat National at the end of 2024–25 season due to AC Ajaccio being relegated for financial reasons.

The club was formed in 1898 and its achievements are comparatively minor, with their biggest feat to date consisting of reaching the semi-finals during the 1936–37 edition of the Coupe de France, and one Ligue 1 season in 2009–10. Boulogne play their home matches at the Stade de la Libération, which seats 15,004, having previously seated only 7,000 prior to its renovation in 2007.

== History ==
=== Early years ===
US Boulogne were originally founded in December 1898 by a group of young local athletes. While they mainly focused originally on athletic events, they created a football team to provide themselves with sporting competition in the winter months, and made a decent job in their first few years as a football club. Boulogne won the Maritime Championship three years running between 1904 and 1906. They next won the Championship in 1909 and their final victory of this division was in 1922. In 1924, Boulogne moved to the Northern Championship and fared well. The team also did well in the Coupe de France – reaching the quarterfinals in 1929 and the last 16 three times.

In 1926, Boulogne won the Northern League and only six years later, they decided to become a professional club. In 1935, under chairman Marcel Lacroix, the team joined the professional leagues. However, they played averagely in Division Two, but in the Coupe de France 1937 competition Boulogne reached the semi-finals, where they were convincingly beaten by FC Sochaux 6–0. After the war, Boulogne, reverted to amateur status – and only decided to become a professional team again in 1957, when they were re-elected into Division Two. They stayed comfortably in Division Two for 22 years but then plummeted through the divisions – suffering consecutive relegations. The Coupe de France competition only provided little respite, as the team made the last 16 three times.

Robert Senechal arrived in 1983 and stabilised the club in Division Four. They missed out on promotion by a narrow margin in 1984 – but were finally promoted in 1991. However, it was short-lived and they were relegated the following season. In June 1994, it was announced that Boulogne were in serious debt – owing ₣3 million.

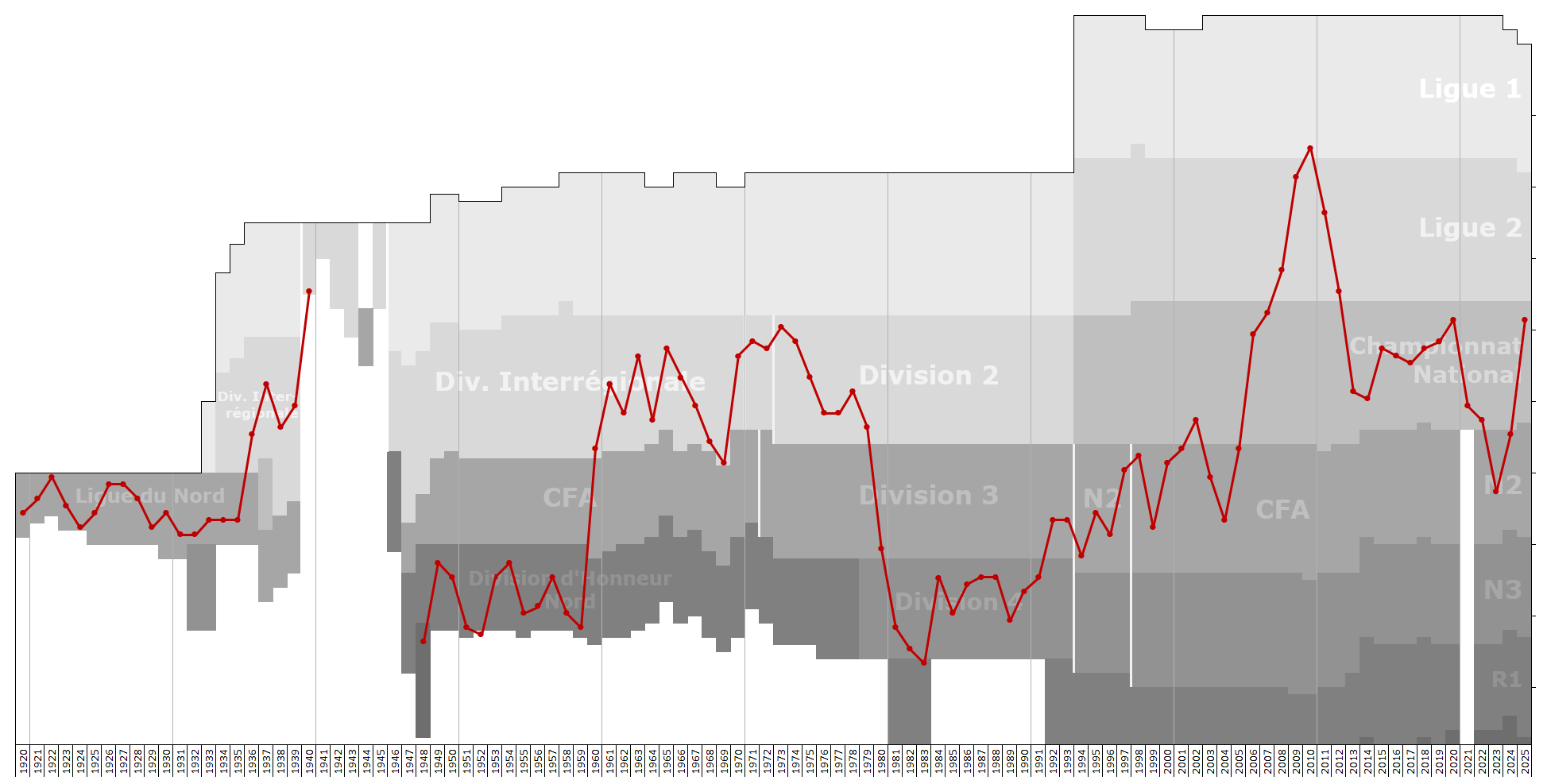
Historical league performance chart of US Boulogne

=== Muselet takeover and rise to Ligue 1 ===
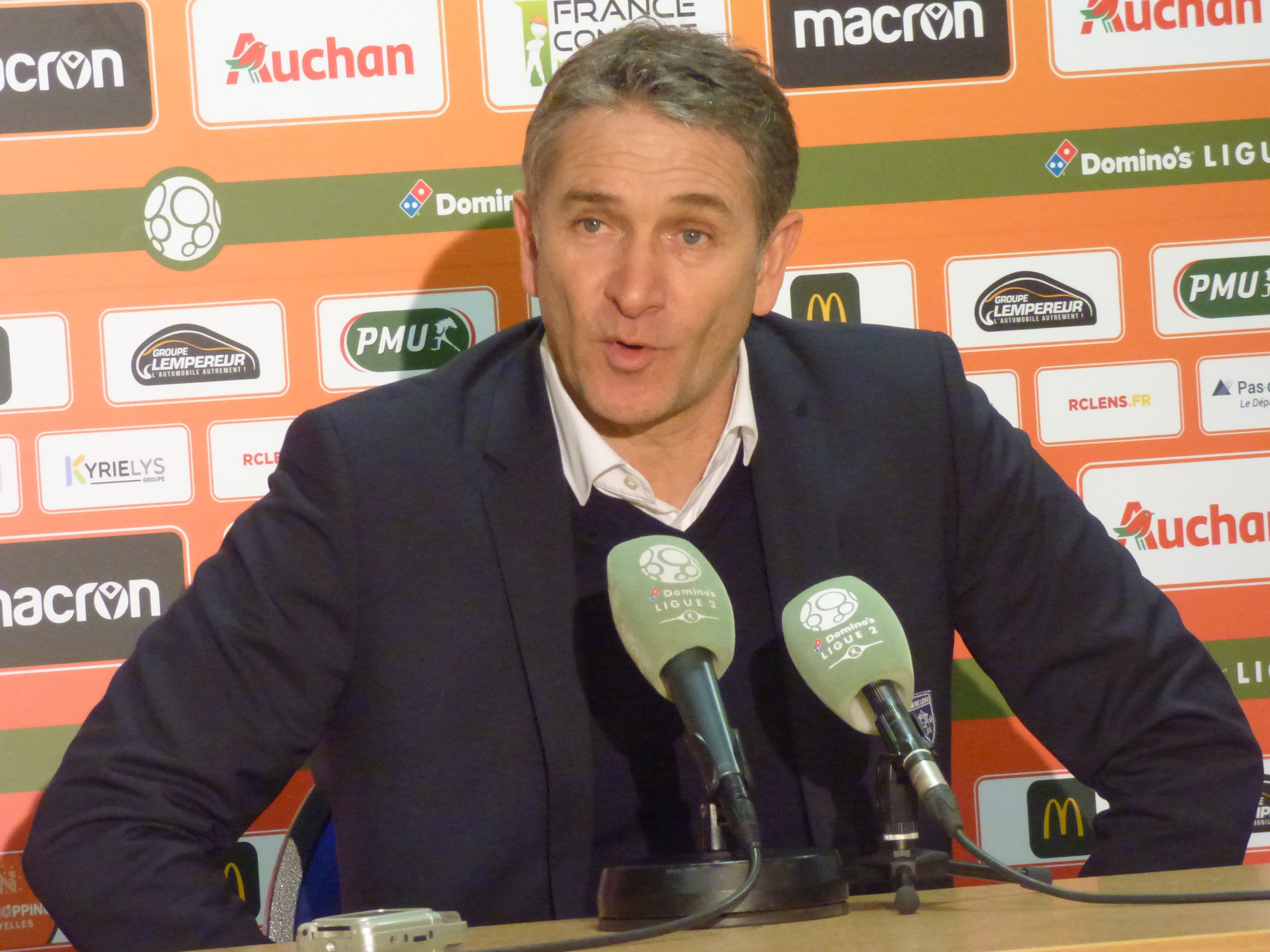
Manager Philippe Montanier was appointed in 2004, and took Boulogne from the fourth tier to Ligue 1 before leaving in 2009.

Mayor of Boulougne and billionaire Jean Muselet intervened to save the club and appointed Jacques Wattez as chairman. Under the leadership of Wattez, the club adopted a new official name – Union Sportive Boulogne Côte d'Opale – in July 1994. as a new company, the debts of the club were wiped and Boulogne – although still struggling in Division Four – reached the last sixteen of the Coupe de France again in 1997–98. They earned a home tie against Ligue 1 side Olympique de Marseille, losing 1–0. In the following edition of the cup, they reached the last 32 before losing 2–1 at home to Ligue 1 neighbours Lille OSC. On 17 March 1999, the club marked their centenary by hosting Liverpool – managed by Gérard Houllier of nearby Thérouanne – in a friendly and winning 2–1.

In 2004, Boulogne hired Philippe Montanier in his first job in senior management. He won promotion to the Championnat National in his first season, and to Ligue 2 with a 2–1 victory over SC Toulon on 11 May 2007. Boulogne stayed up on the last day of the 2007–08 Ligue 2 season with a last-second win over Chamois Niortais F.C., who needed a draw to avoid the drop themselves.

The 2008–09 season saw Boulogne win promotion on the final day of the season after beating SC Amiens 4–0, replacing RC Strasbourg in the final promotion place by a single point; striker Grégory Thil finished top scorer with 18 goals. Montanier left for Valenciennes FC and was replaced by Laurent Guyot, former academy director at FC Nantes. They stayed just one season, being relegated in 19th place with 31 points; the first of their seven wins was in the second game on 16 August 2009, 2–1 at home to Grenoble Foot 38. In the same season, the team reached the quarter-finals of the 2009–10 Coupe de France, losing 3–1 away to fourth-tier US Quevilly.

=== Decline and rise ===
Boulogne were relegated at the end of the 2011–12 Ligue 2 season, ending their five-year spell in the professional leagues. The team reached the quarter-finals of the 2014–15 Coupe de France, losing on penalties to AS Saint-Étienne after a 1–1 home draw.

In March 2020, Boulogne were third in Championnat National when the season was prematurely ended due to the COVID-19 pandemic. They were denied an opportunity for promotion when the FFF executive committee announced that the usual playoff between 18th in Ligue 2 and 3rd in Championnat National would not go ahead. The team finished bottom of the 2021–22 Championnat National table, and were relegated to Championnat National 2 after 17 years in the top three divisions. The team nearly suffered a second consecutive relegation in the 2022–23 Championnat National 2, surviving in 9th place after an improved second half of the season.

On 27 April 2024, Boulogne secure promotion to Championnat National from next season, champions of Championnat National 2 in 2023–24 season after defeat Racing CFF with score 3-1 and the club return to third tier after two years.

For the 2025–26 season, Boulogne gets promoted to Ligue 2 due to AC Ajaccio getting relegated for financial reasons.

== Players ==
=== Current squad ===
As of 7 September 2026

Note: Flags indicate national team as defined under FIFA eligibility rules; some limited exceptions apply. Players may hold more than one non-FIFA nationality.

No.	Pos.	Nation	Player
1	GK	MTQ	Xavier Lenogue
4	DF	FRA	Jonathan Kapenga
7	FW	FRA	Aymane Nassiri
8	MF	FRA	Jonas Martin
9	FW	FRA	Martin Lecolier
10	MF	FRA	Abdel Hbouch
11	FW	FRA	Noah Fatar
12	DF	FRA	Julien Boyer
13	FW	FRA	Ludéric Etonde
14	MF	FRA	Joffrey Bultel
15	DF	FRA	Adrien Pinot
16	GK	GUI	Ibrahim Koné
17	FW	BIH	Benjamin Bešić
18	DF	FRA	Demba Thiam

No.	Pos.	Nation	Player
19	MF	FRA	Nolan Binet
20	DF	FRA	Théo Brusco
21	DF	FRA	Aurélien Platret
22	DF	FRA	Sonny Duflos
24	DF	FRA	Louis Siliadin
25	DF	FRA	Antoine Kerriou
26	DF	FRA	Oscar Lenne
28	MF	FRA	Sohan Paillard
29	DF	FRA	Mathieu Mion
30	GK	FRA	Azamat Uriev
64	FW	FRA	Théo Epailly
97	DF	GLP	Zoran Moco
99	GK	CMR	Blondy Nna Noukeu

=== Out on loan ===
Note: Flags indicate national team as defined under FIFA eligibility rules; some limited exceptions apply. Players may hold more than one non-FIFA nationality.

No.	Pos.	Nation	Player
—	FW	FRA	Exaucé Mpembele Boula (at Bourg-en-Bresse until 30 June 2027)

=== Staff ===
- Manager: (France) Fabien Dagneaux
- Assistant manager: (France) Anthony Lecointe
- Goalkeeping coach: (France) Hugo Stevenart
- Fitness trainer: (France) Antoine Decaix

=== Notable players ===
- (France) N'Golo Kanté
- (France) Randal Kolo Muani
- (France) Franck Ribéry

== Managers ==
- Blaud (1936–37)
- Ernest Payne (1937–38)
- François Bourbotte (1950–56)
- Jean Prouff (1956–58)
- Roger Meerseman (1959–61)
- Jean-Marie Prévost (1961–62)
- André Cheuva (1962–66)
- Angelo Grizzetti (1966–67)
- Ernest Schultz (1967)
- Jean Laune (1967–69)
- Ramon Muller and Jean Aubert (1969)
- Daniel Langrand (1969–73)
- André Pruvost (1973)
- Léon Deladerrière (1973)
- Jacques Favre (1973–74)
- Célestin Oliver (1974–75)
- Henri-Gérard Augustine (1975)
- Daniel Langrand (1975–76)
- Daniel Langrand and "Doudou" Douglas (1976–79)
- "Doudou" Douglas (1979–82)
- Bernard Soulliez (1982–86)
- Gilbert Zoonekynd (1986–88)
- André Bodji (1988–89)
- Edmond Baraffe (1989–90)
- Bernard Soulliez (1990–92)
- Richard Ellena (1992–94)
- Pascal Langlois (1994–96)
- Bruno Dupuis (1996–97)
- Alex Dupont (1997–98)
- Robert Dewilder (1998–99)
- Bruno Dupuis (1999–01)
- Jacky Colinet (2001–03)
- Pascal Langlois (2003)
- Bobby Brown (2003–04)
- Bruno Dupuis (2004)
- Philippe Montanier (2004–09)
- Laurent Guyot (2009–10)
- Michel Estevan (2010–11)
- Pascal Plancque (2011–12)
- Georges Tournay (2012–13)
- Stéphane Le Mignan (2013–16)
- Alain Pochat (2016–17)
- Olivier Frapolli (2017–19)
- Laurent Guyot (2019–21)
- Éric Chelle (2021)
- Stéphane Jobard (2021–22)
- Christophe Raymond (2022–23)
- Fabien Dagneaux (2023–)
