= 2024–25 OGC Nice season =

OGC Nice
2024–25 season
- Owner: Ineos
- President: Jean-Pierre Rivère
- Head coach: Franck Haise
- Stadium: Allianz Riviera
- Ligue 1: 4th
- Coupe de France: Round of 16
- UEFA Europa League: League phase
- Top goalscorer: League: Evann Guessand (12); All: Evann Guessand (13)
- Average home league attendance: 23,892
Home colours	Away colours	Third colours

The 2024–25 season was the 121st season in the history of OGC Nice, and the club's 23rd consecutive season in the French top flight. In addition to the domestic league, the club participated in the Coupe de France and the UEFA Europa League.

== Summary ==
On 22 May 2024, captain Dante extended his contract, which was due to expire, for another year. On 6 June, the club's new coach was announced, with the appointment of Franck Haise for a three-year term, succeeding Francesco Farioli, who left for Ajax.

== Players ==
=== First-team squad ===
As of 31 January 2025

Note: Flags indicate national team as defined under FIFA eligibility rules; some limited exceptions apply. Players may hold more than one non-FIFA nationality.

No.	Pos.	Nation	Player
1	GK	POL	Marcin Bułka
2	DF	TUN	Ali Abdi
4	DF	BRA	Dante (captain)
5	DF	EGY	Mohamed Abdelmonem
6	MF	ALG	Hicham Boudaoui
7	FW	CIV	Jérémie Boga
8	MF	NED	Pablo Rosario
9	FW	NGR	Terem Moffi
10	FW	MAR	Sofiane Diop
11	MF	FRA	Morgan Sanson
15	FW	GER	Youssoufa Moukoko (on loan from Borussia Dortmund)
19	MF	ALG	Badredine Bouanani
20	DF	FRA	Tom Louchet
22	MF	FRA	Tanguy Ndombele

No.	Pos.	Nation	Player
24	FW	FRA	Gaëtan Laborde
25	FW	FRA	Mohamed-Ali Cho
26	DF	FRA	Melvin Bard
28	MF	FRA	Baptiste Santamaria (on loan from Rennes)
29	FW	CIV	Evann Guessand
31	GK	FRA	Maxime Dupé
33	DF	SEN	Antoine Mendy
44	DF	FRA	Amidou Doumbouya
45	FW	NGR	Victor Orakpo
55	MF	BDI	Youssouf Ndayishimiye
64	DF	CAN	Moïse Bombito
77	GK	ALG	Teddy Boulhendi
92	DF	FRA	Jonathan Clauss

=== Out on loan ===
Note: Flags indicate national team as defined under FIFA eligibility rules; some limited exceptions apply. Players may hold more than one non-FIFA nationality.

No.	Pos.	Nation	Player
—	DF	MAR	Ayoub Amraoui (at Martigues until 30 June 2025)
—	DF	FRA	Jean-Clair Todibo (at West Ham United until 30 June 2025)
—	DF	ITA	Mattia Viti (at Empoli until 30 June 2025)
—	MF	ALG	Billal Brahimi (at Sint-Truiden until 30 June 2025)

No.	Pos.	Nation	Player
—	MF	GUI	Issiaga Camara (at Dijon until 30 June 2025)
—	MF	ROU	Rareș Ilie (at Catanzaro until 30 June 2025)
—	FW	GUI	Aliou Baldé (at Lausanne-Sport until 30 June 2025)

== Transfers ==
=== In ===
No.	Pos.	Player	Transferred from	Fee	Date	Source
11	MF	(France) Morgan Sanson	(England) Aston Villa	€4,000,000 (Note: Loan signing made permanent.)	14 May 2024	
22	MF	(France) Tanguy Ndombele	Unattached	Free	4 July 2024	
92	DF	(France) Jonathan Clauss	(France) Marseille	€5,000,000 (Note: Up to €1,000,000 in bonuses.)	25 July 2024	
64	DF	(Canada) Moïse Bombito	(United States) Colorado Rapids	€7,000,000	19 August 2024	
15	FW	(Germany) Youssoufa Moukoko	(Germany) Borussia Dortmund	Loan	28 August 2024	
5	DF	(Egypt) Mohamed Abdelmonem	(Egypt) Al Ahly	€4,200,000 (Note: Up to €1,000,000 in bonuses + 10% of the next deal as a sell on clause.)	29 August 2024	
2	DF	(Tunisia) Ali Abdi	(France) Caen	€500,000	2 September 2024	
28	MF	(France) Baptiste Santamaria	(France) Rennes	Loan	22 January 2025	

=== Out ===
Pos.	Player	Transferred to	Fee	Date	Source
DF	(France) Romain Perraud	(England) Southampton	Loan return	1 July 2024	
DF	(France) Valentin Rosier	(Turkey) Beşiktaş	Loan return	1 July 2024	
DF	(Brazil) Robson Bambu	(Portugal) Braga	€1,200,000	1 July 2024	
MF	(France) Alexis Claude-Maurice	Released (Note: On 31 August 2024, Claude-Maurice signed for FC Augsburg.)	Free	1 July 2024	
MF	(France) Khéphren Thuram	(Italy) Juventus	€20,000,000	10 July 2024	
DF	(France) Yannis Nahounou	(Italy) Reggiana	Undisclosed	20 July 2024	
DF	(Italy) Mattia Viti	(Italy) Empoli	Loan (Note: Includes an option to sign permanently.)	22 July 2024	
MF	(Canada) Justin Smith	(Spain) Espanyol	Undisclosed	23 July 2024	
DF	(Morocco) Ayoub Amraoui	(France) Martigues	Loan	1 August 2024	
DF	(France) Jean-Clair Todibo	(England) West Ham United	Loan (Note: Includes an obligation to sign permanently for €40,000,000.)	10 August 2024	
FW	(Guinea) Aliou Baldé	(Germany) VfL Bochum	Loan	10 August 2024	
MF	(France) Alexis Beka Beka	Released	Free	16 August 2024	
DF	(Switzerland) Jordan Lotomba	(Netherlands) Feyenoord	€5,000,000	2 September 2024	
MF	(Romania) Rareș Ilie	(Italy) Catanzaro	Loan	24 January 2025	
MF	(Guinea) Issiaga Camara	(France) Dijon	Loan	31 January 2025	

== Friendlies ==
=== Pre-season ===
10 July 2024 Friendly	Nice	2–2	Lausanne-Sport	Nice
10:30 CEST (UTC+2)	Cho 23'; Guessand 65'	Report	Diabaté 68'; Szalai 87'	Stadium: Stade de la Plaine du Var; Attendance: 0

19 July 2024 Friendly	Nice	2–2	Leganés	Nice
10:30 CEST (UTC+2)	Boga 19'; Brahimi 83'	Report	D. García 39' (pen.); López 53'	Stadium: Stade de la Plaine du Var; Attendance: 0 Referee: Benoît Millot (France)

27 July 2024 Friendly	Çaykur Rizespor	2–2	Nice	Haus im Ennstal, Austria
16:00 CEST (UTC+2)	Sowe 35' (pen.), 53'	Report	Laborde 18'; Orakpo 90+3'	Stadium: Ennsboden Arena; Attendance: 0 Referee: Can Cetin (Austria)

4 August 2024 Friendly	Lecce	2–3	Nice	Lecce, Italy
17:00 CEST (UTC+2)	Pierotti (yellow card) 57'; Marchwiński 70', 74'	Report	Guessand 15'; Clauss 49'; Rosario (yellow card) 57'; Mendy (yellow card) 67'; Bouanani 89'	Stadium: Stadio Via del mare Attendance: 4,261; Referee: Leonardo Mastrodomenico (Italy)

10 August 2024 Friendly	Ipswich Town	1–0	Nice	Ipswich, England
12:30 BST (UTC+1)	Tuanzebe 58'	Report	Cho (penalty missed) 45'	Stadium: Portman Road; Referee: James Bell (England)

== Competitions ==
=== Overall record ===
Competition	First match	Last match	Starting round	Final position	Record							
Competition	First match	Last match	Starting round	Final position	Pld	W	D	L	GF	GA	GD	Win %
Ligue 1	18 August 2024	17 May 2025	Matchday 1	4th	34	17	9	8	66	41	+25	50.00
Coupe de France	21 December 2024	5 February 2025	Round of 64	Round of 16	3	1	1	1	3	3	+0	33.33
UEFA Europa League	25 September 2024	30 January 2025	League phase	League phase	8	0	3	5	7	16	−9	0.00
Total					45	18	13	14	76	60	+16	40.00

Source: Soccerway

=== Ligue 1 ===
==== League table ====
Pos	Team	Pld	W	D	L	GF	GA	GD	Pts	Qualification or relegation
2	Marseille	34	20	5	9	74	47	+27	65	Qualification for the Champions League league phase
3	Monaco	34	18	7	9	63	41	+22	61	Qualification for the Champions League league phase
4	Nice	34	17	9	8	66	41	+25	60	Qualification for the Champions League third qualifying round
5	Lille	34	17	9	8	52	36	+16	60	Qualification for the Europa League league phase (Note: Since the 2024–25 Coupe de France winners, Paris Saint-Germain, qualified for the Champions League via league position, the Europa League berth awarded to the cup winners was passed to the sixth-placed team and the Conference League berth was passed to the seventh-placed team.)
6	Lyon	34	17	6	11	65	46	+19	57	Qualification for the Europa League league phase

Source: Ligue 1
Rules for classification: 1) Points; 2) Goal difference; 3) Head-to-head points; 4) Head-to-head goal difference; 5) Head-to-head goals scored; 6) Head-to-head away goals scored; 7) Goals scored; 8) Away goals scored; 9) Fair-play points (Note: Head-to-head record is used only after all the matches between the teams in question have been played).

==== Results summary ====
Overall								Home						Away					
Pld	W	D	L	GF	GA	GD	Pts	W	D	L	GF	GA	GD	W	D	L	GF	GA	GD
34	17	9	8	66	41	+25	60	11	4	2	38	15	+23	6	5	6	28	26	+2

Source: Ligue 1

==== Results by round ====
Round	1	2	3	4	5	6	7	8	9	10	11	12	13	14	15	16	17	18	19	20	21	22	23	24	25	26	27	28	29	30	31	32	33	34
Ground	A	H	A	A	H	A	H	A	H	A	H	H	A	H	A	H	A	A	H	A	H	A	H	A	H	H	A	H	A	H	A	H	A	H
Result	L	D	W	L	W	D	D	D	W	W	D	W	L	W	D	W	W	L	W	D	W	W	W	W	L	D	L	L	D	W	W	W	L	W
Position	12	12	8	12	7	9	9	8	8	5	6	5	6	6	6	6	4	5	4	5	3	3	3	3	3	4	4	6	7	5	6	4	4	4

Source: Ligue 1
A = Away; H = Home; W = Win; D = Draw; L = Loss

==== Matches ====
The league schedule was released on 21 June 2024.

18 August 2024 1	Auxerre	2–1	Nice	Auxerre
15:00 CEST (UTC+2)	Raveloson 44'; Coulibaly 90+5'	Report	Cho 21'	Stadium: Stade de l'Abbé-Deschamps; Attendance: 16,354; Referee: Romain Lissorgue

25 August 2024 2	Nice	1–1	Toulouse	Nice
17:00 CEST (UTC+2)	Bard (yellow card) 45+1'; Rosario (yellow card) 50'; Clauss 53'; Dante (yellow card) 56'; Mendy (yellow card) 82'	Report	McKenzie (yellow card) 54'; Dønnum (yellow card) 61'; Babicka 73'	Stadium: Allianz Riviera; Attendance: 21,656; Referee: Bastien Dechepy

1 September 2024 3	Angers	1–4	Nice	Angers
17:00 CEST (UTC+2)	Bamba (yellow card) 11'; Fofana (yellow card) 33'; Aholou (yellow card) 41'; Belkhdim (yellow card) 45'; Abdelli 67' (pen.); Dieng (yellow card) 81'; Capelle (yellow card) 81'	Report	Ndayishimiye 6'; Bouanani (yellow card) 16'; Boudaoui 25', (yellow card) 56'; Bombito (yellow card) 30' (yellow-red card) 65'; Guessand 72', 85'	Stadium: Stade Raymond Kopa; Attendance: 9,168; Referee: Jérémy Stinat

14 September 2024 4	Marseille	2–0	Nice	Marseille
17:00 CEST (UTC+2)	Brassier (yellow card) 18'; Maupay 40'; Luis Henrique 53'; Cornelius (yellow card) 63' (yellow-red card) 74'; Rongier (yellow card) 64'; Rowe (yellow card) 90+1'	Report	Dante (yellow card) 13'; Rosario (yellow card) 31'; Abdi (yellow card) 78'	Stadium: Stade Vélodrome; Attendance: 65,803; Referee: Benoît Millot

20 September 2024 5	Nice	8–0	Saint-Étienne	Nice
20:45 CEST (UTC+2)	Batubinsika 4' (o.g.); Ndombele 7'; Cho 53'; Moukoko 26', 39'; Guessand 36'; Diop 75'; Rosario 86' (pen.)	Report	Ekwah (yellow card) 22'	Stadium: Allianz Riviera; Attendance: 30,024; Referee: Thomas Léonard

28 September 2024 6	Lens	0–0	Nice	Lens
17:00 CEST (UTC+2)	Frankowski (yellow card) 53'; Zaroury (yellow card) 67' (yellow-red card) 84'	Report	Abdelmonem (yellow card) 28'; Dante (yellow card) 90+9'	Stadium: Stade Bollaert-Delelis; Attendance: 37,301; Referee: François Letexier

6 October 2024 7	Nice	1–1	Paris Saint-Germain	Nice
20:45 CEST (UTC+2)	Abdi 39'; Boudaoui (yellow card) 71'	Report	Hakimi (yellow card) 36'; Marquinhos (yellow card) 36'; Mendes 52'	Stadium: Allianz Riviera; Attendance: 30,247; Referee: Jérôme Brisard

20 October 2024 8	Nantes	1–1	Nice	Nantes
17:00 CEST (UTC+2)	Zézé (yellow card) 33'; Chirivella (yellow card) 38'; Abline 67'	Report	Guessand 72'; Clauss (yellow card) 89'	Stadium: Stade de la Beaujoire; Attendance: 28,141; Referee: Gaël Angoula

27 October 2024 9	Nice	2–1	Monaco	Nice
17:00 CET (UTC+1)	Guessand 45+1'; Cho (yellow card) 45+4'; Laborde 71'; Bard (yellow card) 77'	Report	Magassa (yellow card) 15'; Vanderson (yellow card) 35' (yellow-red card) 45+4'; Embolo 39'; Singo (yellow card) 45'; Camara (yellow card) 52'	Stadium: Allianz Riviera; Attendance: 29,795; Referee: Jérémie Pignard

2 November 2024 10	Brest	0–1	Nice	Brest
19:00 CET (UTC+1)		Report	Guessand 42'; Dante (yellow card) 74'; Abdelmonem (yellow card) 84'	Stadium: Stade Francis-Le Blé; Attendance: 14,534; Referee: Clément Turpin

10 November 2024 11	Nice	2–2	Lille	Nice
15:00 CET (UTC+1)	Clauss (yellow card) 37'; Diop 56', (yellow card) 85'; Louchet 90+6'	Report	Fernandez-Pardo 17'; Bakker 66'; David (yellow card) 86'; Ang. Gomes (yellow card) 90+5'	Stadium: Allianz Riviera; Attendance: 25,063; Referee: Jérémy Stinat

24 November 2024 12	Nice	2–1	Strasbourg	Nice
21:00 CET (UTC+1)	Dante (yellow card) 45+5'; Bard 54'; Sylla 62' (o.g.); Rosario (yellow card) 77'	Report	Bakwa 20'	Stadium: Allianz Riviera; Attendance: 18,389; Referee: Benoît Bastien

1 December 2024 13	Lyon	4–1	Nice	Décines-Charpieu
17:00 CET (UTC+1)	Lacazette 4', 41', 69' (pen.); Veretout 43'; Tagliafico (yellow card) 90+1'	Report	Diop 22'; Boudaoui (yellow card) 54'; Louchet (yellow card) 90+6'	Stadium: Parc Olympique Lyonnais; Attendance: 50,977; Referee: Bastien Dechepy

7 December 2024 14	Nice	2–1	Le Havre	Nice
19:00 CET (UTC+1)	Laborde 55' (pen.); Boudaoui (yellow card) 64'; Bouanani 75'; Ndombele (yellow card) 86'; Guessand (yellow card) 90+5'	Report	Lloris (yellow card) 82', (goal) 90+2'; Pembélé (yellow card) 88'	Stadium: Allianz Riviera; Attendance: 21,248; Referee: François Letexier

15 December 2024 15	Montpellier	2–2	Nice	Montpellier
15:00 CET (UTC+1)	Chotard 22'; Sainte-Luce 80'; Nzingoula (yellow card) 90+4'	Report	Laborde 17'; Bouanani 28', (yellow card) 34'; Clauss (yellow card) 53'	Stadium: Stade de la Mosson; Attendance: 11,612; Referee: Clement Turpin

3 January 2025 16	Nice	3–2	Rennes	Nice
21:00 CET (UTC+1)	Boudaoui (yellow card) 10'; Guessand 12'; Diop 34', (yellow card) 66'; Laborde 45+5'; Rosario (red card) 90+2'; Ndayishimiye (yellow card) 90+3'	Report	Kalimuendo 27'; Assignon (yellow card) 31'; Truffert 49'; Matusiwa (yellow card) 61'; Blas (yellow card) 90+3'	Stadium: Allianz Riviera; Attendance: 21,332; Referee: Jérôme Brisard

11 January 2025 17	Reims	2–4	Nice	Reims
19:00 CET (UTC+1)	Itō 34'; Munetsi (yellow card) 42'; Akieme (yellow card) 48'; Atangana (yellow card) 65'; Diakhon 71'; Diakité (yellow card) 74'	Report	Guessand 28', (yellow card) 37'; Laborde 44' (pen.), 64'; Diop (yellow card) 68'; Abdi 86'	Stadium: Stade Auguste Delaune; Attendance: 12,270; Referee: Willy Delajod

17 January 2025 18	Lille	2–1	Nice	Villeneuve-d'Ascq
21:00 CET (UTC+1)	André (yellow card) 34'; Haraldsson 48'; Diakité 63'	Report	Diop 29'; Clauss (yellow card) 42'; Boudaoui (yellow card) 83'; Ndombele (yellow card) 88'	Stadium: Stade Pierre-Mauroy; Attendance: 38,325; Referee: François Letexier

26 January 2025 19	Nice	2–0	Marseille	Nice
20:45 CET (UTC+1)	Guessand 7'; Cho 51'; Ndayishimiye (yellow card) 73'	Report	Bakola (yellow card) 89'	Stadium: Allianz Riviera; Attendance: 31,017; Referee: Eric Wattellier

2 February 2025 20	Toulouse	1–1	Nice	Toulouse
15:00 CET (UTC+1)	Zajc (yellow card) 76'; McKenzie 85'; Aboukhlal (yellow card) 90+3'	Report	Laborde 18' (pen.); Boudaoui (yellow card) 63'; Ndayishimiye (yellow card) 90+3'	Stadium: Stadium de Toulouse; Attendance: 23,516; Referee: Thomas Léonard

8 February 2025 21	Nice	2–0	Lens	Nice
17:00 CET (UTC+1)	Cho (yellow card) 7'; Laborde 10' (pen.); Clauss 64'	Report	Thomasson (yellow card) 9'; Medina (yellow card) 31' (yellow-red card) 57'; Ojediran (yellow card) 88'	Stadium: Allianz Riviera; Attendance: 22,586; Referee: Romain Lissorgue

16 February 2025 22	Le Havre	1–3	Nice	Le Havre
17:15 CET (UTC+1)	Kechta 28', (yellow card) 53'; Mwanga (yellow card) 45'	Report	Laborde 16'; Kinkoue 18' (o.g.); Bard (yellow card) 34' (yellow-red card) 90+1'; Diop 90+4'	Stadium: Stade Océane; Attendance: 17,739; Referee: Stéphanie Frappart

23 February 2025 23	Nice	2–0	Montpellier	Nice
17:15 CET (UTC+1)	Clauss 30'; Boudaoui 65'; Ndayishimiye (yellow card) 71'	Report	Fayad (yellow card) 50'	Stadium: Allianz Riviera; Attendance: 18,519; Referee: Willy Delajod

1 March 2025 24	Saint-Étienne	1–3	Nice	Saint-Étienne
17:00 CET (UTC+1)	Cardona (yellow card) 5'; Stassin 32'; Bernauer (yellow card) 90+5'	Report	Clauss (yellow card) 6'; Rosario 10'; Nadé 52' (o.g.); Guessand 69'	Stadium: Stade Geoffroy-Guichard; Attendance: 30,070; Referee: Jérôme Brisard

9 March 2025 25	Nice	0–2	Lyon	Nice
20:45 CET (UTC+1)	Ndayishimiye (yellow card) 72'	Report	Kumbedi (yellow card) 4'; Cherki 78'; Nuamah 83'; Tolisso (yellow card) 90+5'	Stadium: Allianz Riviera; Attendance: 23,840; Referee: Benoît Bastien

14 March 2025 26	Nice	1–1	Auxerre	Nice
20:45 CET (UTC+1)	Guessand 37'; Rosario (yellow card) 81'; Bard (red card) 87'	Report	Danois (yellow card) 29'; Owusu (yellow card) 71'; Massengo (yellow card) 86'; Ayé 90+4'	Stadium: Allianz Riviera; Attendance: 18,640; Referee: Abdelatif Kherradji

29 March 2025 27	Monaco	2–1	Nice	Monaco
21:00 CET (UTC+1)	Biereth (penalty missed) 5', 55'; Embolo (yellow card) 27', (goal) 73'; Mawissa (yellow card) 51'	Report	Boga 41'; Clauss (yellow card) 45'; Santamaria (yellow card) 72'; Laborde (yellow card) 87'; Boudaoui (yellow card) 87'; Dante (red card) 90+1'	Stadium: Stade Louis II; Attendance: 11,564; Referee: Jérôme Brisard

4 April 2025 28	Nice	1–2	Nantes	Nice
20:45 CEST (UTC+2)	Abdi 14'; Bombito (yellow card) 28'	Report	Douglas Augusto 11'; Abline 38'; Sow (yellow card) 47'	Stadium: Allianz Riviera; Attendance: 20,585; Referee: Hakim Ben El Hadj

12 April 2025 29	Strasbourg	2–2	Nice	Strasbourg
21:05 CEST (UTC+2)	Emegha 51'; Amo-Ameyaw 54'; Omobamidele (yellow card) 56'	Report	Bard 38'; Boudaoui (yellow card) 73'; Rosario (yellow card) 90+2'; Ndayishimiye 90+4'	Stadium: Stade de la Meinau; Attendance: 19,210; Referee: Jérémie Pignard

20 April 2025 30	Nice	2–1	Angers	Nice
17:15 CEST (UTC+2)	Rosario 36'; Abdi 47'; Clauss (yellow card) 56'	Report	Belkhdim 52'; Abdelli (yellow card) 80'	Stadium: Allianz Riviera; Attendance: 25,088; Referee: Jérémy Stinat

25 April 2025 31	Paris Saint-Germain	1–3	Nice	Paris
20:45 CEST (UTC+2)	Fabián 41'; Neves (yellow card) 45+2'; Mendes (yellow card) 68'; Zaïre-Emery (yellow card) 72'	Report	Sanson 34', 46'; Abdi (yellow card) 43'; Ndayishimiye 70'	Stadium: Parc des Princes; Attendance: 47,597; Referee: Willy Delajod

2 May 2025 32	Nice	1–0	Reims	Nice
20:45 CEST (UTC+2)	Rosario (yellow card) 5'; Sanson 15'; Mendy (yellow card) 41'	Report	Gbane (yellow card) 62'; Nakamura (yellow card) 72'	Stadium: Allianz Riviera; Attendance: 24,758; Referee: Abdelatif Kherradji

10 May 2025 33	Rennes	2–0	Nice	Rennes
21:00 CEST (UTC+2)	Kalimuendo 15', 80'; Brassier (yellow card) 90+4'	Report	Rosario (yellow card) 45+2'	Stadium: Roazhon Park; Attendance: 26,118; Referee: Jérémy Stinat

17 May 2025 34	Nice	6–0	Brest	Nice
21:00 CEST (UTC+2)	Guessand 16'; Laborde 19', 75'; Bouanani 28' (pen.); Moffi 82'; Abdi 90+4'	Report	Locko (yellow card) 26'; Lees-Melou (yellow card) 33'; Ndiaye (yellow card) 48'; Magnetti (yellow card) 62'; Baldé (yellow card) 90+3'	Stadium: Allianz Riviera; Attendance: 30,298; Referee: Hakim Ben El Hadj

=== Coupe de France ===
21 December 2024 Round of 64	Corte	1–1 (3–5 p)	Nice	Furiani
18:00 CET (UTC+1)	Rimane (yellow card) 5'; Boussemart 11'; Machado (yellow card) 31'; Aït Yahia (yellow card) 49'; Fanni (yellow card) 85'	Report	Diop (penalty missed) 4'; Bombito (yellow card) 12'; Camara (yellow card) 34'; Nandjou (red card) 39'; Ndombele 60'	Stadium: Stade Armand-Cesari; Attendance: 4,591; Referee: Abdelatif Kherradji
	Penalties
	Machado (penalty scored); Fonovich (penalty scored); Tamboura (penalty scored); Perotto (penalty missed)		(penalty scored) Laborde; (penalty scored) Ndombele; (penalty scored) Diop; (penalty scored) Bouanani; (penalty scored) Clauss

14 January 2025 Round of 32	Bastia	0–1	Nice	Furiani
20:45 CET (UTC+1)	Boutrah (penalty missed) 45'	Report	Moukoko 61'	Stadium: Stade Armand-Cesari; Attendance: 9,299; Referee: Benoît Bastien

5 February 2025 Round of 16	Stade Briochin	2–1	Nice	Saint-Brieuc
20:45 CET (UTC+1)	Gomis-Maillard (yellow card) 18'; Boudin 88', 90+7'; Benhaim (yellow card) 90'	Report	Clauss (yellow card) 41'; Louchet 55'	Stadium: Stade Fred-Aubert; Attendance: 4,685; Referee: Hakim Ben El Hadj

=== UEFA Europa League ===
==== League phase ====
The draw for the league phase was held on 30 August 2024.

Pos	Team	Pld	W	D	L	GF	GA	GD	Pts
32	(Latvian Football Federation) RFS	8	1	2	5	6	13	−7	5
33	(Bulgarian Football Union) Ludogorets Razgrad	8	0	4	4	4	11	−7	4
34	(Ukrainian Association of Football) Dynamo Kyiv	8	1	1	6	5	18	−13	4
35	(French Football Federation) Nice	8	0	3	5	7	16	−9	3
36	(Association of Football Federations of Azerbaijan) Qarabağ	8	1	0	7	6	20	−14	3

Source: UEFA
Rules for classification: League phase tiebreakers

Round	1	2	3	4	5	6	7	8
Ground	H	A	A	H	H	A	A	H
Result	D	L	L	D	L	L	L	D
Position	20	30	32	31	35	35	35	35

Source: UEFA
A = Away; H = Home; W = Win; D = Draw; L = Loss

25 September 2024 1	Nice (France)	1–1	(Spain) Real Sociedad	Nice
21:00 CEST (UTC+2)	Rosario (yellow card) 26', (goal) 45'; Guessand (yellow card) 26', (penalty missed) 54'	Report	Barrenetxea 18'; Zubimendi (yellow card) 20'; Odriozola (yellow card) 43'; Pacheco (yellow card) 53'	Stadium: Allianz Riviera; Attendance: 20,545; Referee: Morten Krogh (Denmark)

3 October 2024 2	Lazio (Italy)	4–1	(France) Nice	Rome, Italy
18:45 CEST (UTC+2)	Pedro 20'; Castellanos 35', 53'; Zaccagni (yellow card) 59', (goal) 67' (pen.); Pellegrini (yellow card) 85'	Report	Louchet (yellow card) 19'; Boga 41'; Bombito (yellow card) 51'; Bułka (yellow card) 66'	Stadium: Stadio Olimpico; Attendance: 27,314; Referee: Horațiu Feșnic (Romania)

24 October 2024 3	Ferencváros (Hungary)	1–0	(France) Nice	Budapest, Hungary
18:45 CEST (UTC+2)	Bombito 15' (o.g.); Varga (yellow card) 19'; Traoré (yellow card) 84'	Report	Bombito (yellow card) 39'; Abdelmonem (yellow card) 45+1'; Rosario (red card) 84'	Stadium: Ferencváros Stadion; Attendance: 18,371; Referee: Anastasios Sidiropoulos (Greece)

7 November 2024 4	Nice (France)	2–2	(Netherlands) Twente	Nice
18:45 CET (UTC+1)	Camara (yellow card) 24'; Dante (yellow card) 49'; Boga 66'; Diop (red card) 70'; Bombito (yellow card) 84'; Cho 88'	Report	D. Rots 8'; Lammers 60'; Van Rooij (yellow card) 80' (yellow-red card) 90'	Stadium: Allianz Riviera; Attendance: 11,144; Referee: Balázs Berke (Hungary)

28 November 2024 5	Nice (France)	1–4	(Scotland) Rangers	Nice
21:00 CET (UTC+1)	Camara (yellow card) 45+1'; Louchet (yellow card) 81'; Bouanani 83'	Report	Černý 35'; Diomande 38', (yellow card) 45'; Igamane 45+3', 54'; Rice (yellow card) 82'	Stadium: Allianz Riviera; Attendance: 18,008; Referee: Ricardo de Burgos Bengoetxea (Spain)

12 December 2024 6	Union Saint-Gilloise (Belgium)	2–1	(France) Nice	Brussels, Belgium
18:45 CET (UTC+1)	Ivanović 33', 90+2', (yellow card) 90+3'; Vanhoutte (yellow card) 75'; Mac Allister (yellow card) 76'; Khalaily (yellow card) 89'	Report	Guessand 45+1'; Bombito (yellow card) 61'	Stadium: King Baudouin Stadium; Attendance: 7,501; Referee: Chris Kavanagh (England)
Note: The match was played at King Baudouin Stadium in Brussels, instead of Union Saint-Gilloise's regular stadium, Joseph Marien Stadium, which did not meet UEFA requirements.

23 January 2025 7	IF Elfsborg (Sweden)	1–0	(France) Nice	Borås, Sweden
21:00 CET (UTC+1)	Yegbe (yellow card) 13'; Henriksson 62'; Hedlund (yellow card) 89'	Report	Louchet (yellow card) 89'	Stadium: Borås Arena; Attendance: 7,566; Referee: Igor Pajač (Croatia)

30 January 2025 8	Nice (France)	1–1	(Norway) Bodø/Glimt	Nice
21:00 CET (UTC+1)	Camara (yellow card) 43'; Diop (yellow card) 69'; Bouanani 74'; Clauss (yellow card) 85'; Laborde (yellow card) 86'	Report	Bjørkan 54'	Stadium: Allianz Riviera; Attendance: 4,294; Referee: Juxhin Xhaja (Albania)
