= 2023–24 OGC Nice season =

OGC Nice
2023–24 season
- Owner: Ineos
- President: Jean-Pierre Rivère
- Head coach: Francesco Farioli
- Stadium: Allianz Riviera
- Ligue 1: 5th
- Coupe de France: Quarter-finals
- Top goalscorer: League: Terem Moffi (11); All: Terem Moffi (11)
Home colours	Away colours

The 2023–24 season was the 97th season in the history of OGC Nice and their 22nd consecutive season in the top flight. The club participated in Ligue 1 and the Coupe de France.

== Players ==
=== First-team squad ===
As of 31 January 2024

Note: Flags indicate national team as defined under FIFA eligibility rules; some limited exceptions apply. Players may hold more than one non-FIFA nationality.

No.	Pos.	Nation	Player
1	GK	POL	Marcin Bułka
2	DF	FRA	Valentin Rosier (on loan from Beşiktaş)
4	DF	BRA	Dante (captain)
6	DF	FRA	Jean-Clair Todibo
7	MF	CIV	Jérémie Boga
8	MF	NED	Pablo Rosario
9	FW	NGR	Terem Moffi
10	MF	MAR	Sofiane Diop
11	MF	FRA	Morgan Sanson (on loan from Aston Villa)
15	DF	FRA	Romain Perraud (on loan from Southampton)
18	FW	FRA	Alexis Claude-Maurice
19	MF	FRA	Khéphren Thuram
21	MF	FRA	Alexis Beka Beka

No.	Pos.	Nation	Player
23	DF	SUI	Jordan Lotomba
24	FW	FRA	Gaëtan Laborde
25	FW	FRA	Mohamed-Ali Cho
26	DF	FRA	Melvin Bard
27	FW	SEN	Aliou Baldé
28	MF	ALG	Hicham Boudaoui
29	FW	CIV	Evann Guessand
31	GK	FRA	Maxime Dupé
32	MF	FRA	Tom Louchet
33	DF	FRA	Antoine Mendy
34	DF	FRA	Yannis Nahounou
44	DF	FRA	Amidou Doumbouya
55	DF	BDI	Youssouf Ndayishimiye

=== Out on loan ===
Note: Flags indicate national team as defined under FIFA eligibility rules; some limited exceptions apply. Players may hold more than one non-FIFA nationality.

No.	Pos.	Nation	Player
—	DF	MAR	Ayoub Amraoui (at Amiens until 30 June 2024)
—	DF	BRA	Robson Bambu (at Arouca until 30 June 2024)
—	DF	CAN	Justin Smith (at Avranches until 30 June 2024)
—	DF	ITA	Mattia Viti (at Sassuolo until 30 June 2024)

No.	Pos.	Nation	Player
—	MF	ALG	Badredine Bouanani (at Lorient until 30 June 2024)
—	MF	ALG	Billal Brahimi (at Brest until 30 June 2024)
—	MF	ROU	Rareș Ilie (at Lausanne-Sport until 30 June 2024)

== Transfers ==
=== In ===
Pos.	Player	Transferred from	Fee	Date	Source
FW	(Nigeria) Terem Moffi	(France) Lorient	€22,500,000	1 July 2023	
MF	(France) Morgan Sanson	(England) Aston Villa	Loan	24 July 2023	
FW	(Ivory Coast) Jérémie Boga	(Italy) Atalanta	€18,000,000	25 July 2023	
FW	(Senegal) Aliou Baldé	(Switzerland) Lausanne-Sport	€2,500,000	1 September 2023	

=== Out ===
Pos.	Player	Transferred to	Fee	Date	Source
FW	(Algeria) Andy Delort	(France) Nantes	€5,000,000	1 July 2023	
MF	(Romania) Rareș Ilie	(Switzerland) Lausanne-Sport	Loan	1 July 2023	
MF	(England) Ross Barkley	(England) Luton Town	End of contract	1 July 2023	
FW	(Denmark) Kasper Dolberg	(Belgium) Anderlecht	Free	7 July 2023	
MF	(Wales) Aaron Ramsey	(Wales) Cardiff City	Free	15 July 2023	
FW	(Algeria) Billal Brahimi	(France) Brest	Loan	1 September 2023	
GK	(Denmark) Kasper Schmeichel	Released		1 September 2023	

=== New contracts ===
Position	Player	Until	Ref.
DF	(Brazil) Dante	June 2024	

== Pre-season and friendlies ==
Win Draw Loss Fixtures

11 July 2023 Friendly	Nice	Cancelled	Union Saint-Gilloise	Nice
10:30
Note: The match was cancelled.

14 July 2023 Friendly	Lausanne-Sport	3–1	Nice	Lausanne, Switzerland
16:30 CEST (UTC+2)	Baldé 14'; Custodio 18'; Sène 25'	Report	Diop 53'	Stadium: Stade du Bois-Gentil

22 July 2023 Friendly	Nice	1–0	Montpellier	Palamós, Spain
10:30 CEST (UTC+2)	Beka Beka 82'	Report
Note: Match was played in three 30-minute periods

29 July 2023 Friendly	Braga	2–0	Nice	Braga, Portugal
19:00 WEST (UTC+1)	R. Horta 39'; Castro 77'	Report		Stadium: Estádio Municipal de Braga

5 August 2023 Sela Cup	Nice	1–1	Villarreal	Newcastle upon Tyne, England
12:30 BST (UTC+1)	Sanson 56'; Bard (yellow card) 90'	Report	Gabbia (yellow card) 8'; Suárez (yellow card) 29'; Brereton (penalty missed) 51', 51'	Stadium: St James' Park; Referee: Robert Jones (England)

6 August 2023 Sela Cup	Nice	1–2	Fiorentina	Newcastle upon Tyne, England
13:00 BST (UTC+1)	Belahyane (yellow card) 19'; Guessand (yellow card) 74'; Bouanani 85'	Report	Jović 17', (yellow card) 19'; Kouamé 35'; Parisi (yellow card) 52'; Ranieri (yellow card) 74'	Stadium: St James' Park

== Competitions ==
=== Overall record ===
Competition	First match	Last match	Starting round	Final position	Record							
Competition	First match	Last match	Starting round	Final position	Pld	W	D	L	GF	GA	GD	Win %
Ligue 1	11 August 2023	19 May 2024	Matchday 1	5th	34	15	10	9	40	29	+11	44.12
Coupe de France	6 January 2024	13 March 2024	Round of 64	Quarter-finals	4	2	1	1	8	6	+2	50.00
Total					38	17	11	10	48	35	+13	44.74

Source: Soccerway

=== Ligue 1 ===
==== League table ====
Pos	Team	Pld	W	D	L	GF	GA	GD	Pts	Qualification or relegation
3	Brest	34	17	10	7	53	34	+19	61	Qualification for the Champions League league phase
4	Lille	34	16	11	7	52	34	+18	59	Qualification for the Champions League third qualifying round
5	Nice	34	15	10	9	40	29	+11	55	Qualification for the Europa League league phase (Note: Since the 2023–24 Coupe de France winners, Paris Saint-Germain, qualified for the Champions League via league position, the Europa League berth awarded to the cup winners was passed to the sixth-placed team and the Conference League berth was passed to the seventh-placed team.)
6	Lyon	34	16	5	13	49	55	−6	53	Qualification for the Europa League league phase
7	Lens	34	14	9	11	45	37	+8	51	Qualification for the Conference League play-off round

Source: Ligue 1
Rules for classification: 1) Points; 2) Goal difference; 3) Head-to-head points; 4) Head-to-head goal difference; 5) Head-to-head goals scored; 6) Head-to-head away goals scored; 7) Goals scored; 8) Away goals scored; 9) Fair-play points (Note: Head-to-head record is used only after all the matches between the teams in question have been played).

==== Results summary ====
Overall								Home						Away					
Pld	W	D	L	GF	GA	GD	Pts	W	D	L	GF	GA	GD	W	D	L	GF	GA	GD
34	15	10	9	40	29	+11	55	9	4	4	21	11	+10	6	6	5	19	18	+1

Source: Ligue 1

==== Results by round ====
Round	1	2	3	4	5	6	7	8	9	10	11	12	13	14	15	16	17	18	19	20	21	22	23	24	25	26	27	28	29	30	31	32	33	34
Ground	H	A	H	H	A	A	H	A	H	A	H	A	H	A	H	A	H	A	H	A	H	A	H	A	H	A	H	A	A	H	A	H	H	A
Result	D	D	D	W	W	W	D	W	W	W	W	D	W	L	W	L	W	L	W	D	L	L	D	L	L	W	L	D	D	W	W	L	W	D
Position	10	10	13	8	4	2	4	2	2	1	1	2	2	2	2	2	2	2	2	2	2	3	4	5	6	5	5	5	5	5	5	5	5	5

Source: Ligue 1
A = Away; H = Home; W = Win; D = Draw; L = Loss

==== Matches ====
The league fixtures were unveiled on 29 June 2023.

11 August 2023 1	Nice	1–1	Lille	Nice
21:00 CEST (UTC+2)	Laborde 19', (yellow card) 45+2'; Atal (yellow card) 35'; Thuram (yellow card) 55'	Report	Haraldsson (yellow card) 38'; Santos (yellow card) 45+3'; Diakité 90+4'	Stadium: Allianz Riviera; Attendance: 29,436; Referee: François Letexier

20 August 2023 2	Lorient	1–1	Nice	Lorient
15:00 CEST (UTC+2)	Laporte (yellow card) 53'; Doucouré 77'	Report	Sanson (yellow card) 52'; Guessand 64'	Stadium: Stade du Moustoir; Attendance: 15,848; Referee: Hakim Ben El Hadj

27 August 2023 3	Nice	0–0	Lyon	Nice
20:45 CEST (UTC+2)	Ndayishimiye (yellow card) 32'	Report	Tagliafico (yellow card) 90'; Ćaleta-Car (yellow card) 90+2'; Alvero (yellow card) 90+5'	Stadium: Allianz Riviera; Attendance: 28,033; Referee: Bastien Dechepy

3 September 2023 4	Nice	2–0	Strasbourg	Nice
17:05 CEST (UTC+2)	Dante (yellow card) 5'; Atal 45+2'; Moffi 75'; Boudaoui (yellow card) 82'	Report	Sissoko (yellow card) 84'	Stadium: Allianz Riviera; Attendance: 20,215; Referee: Jérémy Stinat

15 September 2023 5	Paris Saint-Germain	2–3	Nice	Paris
21:00 CEST (UTC+2)	Mbappé 29', 87'; Barcola (yellow card) 82'; Škriniar (yellow card) 89'	Report	Moffi 21', 69', (yellow card) 70'; Thuram (yellow card) 35'; Laborde 53'; Bard (yellow card) 63'; Bułka (yellow card) 73'; Lotomba (yellow card) 90+5'	Stadium: Parc des Princes; Attendance: 47,874; Referee: Clément Turpin

22 September 2023 6	Monaco	0–1	Nice	Monaco
21:00 CEST (UTC+2)	Balogun (penalty missed) 12', 55'; Golovin (yellow card) 72'	Report	Ndayishimiye (yellow card) 56'; Boga 90+1'	Stadium: Stade Louis II; Attendance: 10,075; Referee: Benoît Millot

1 October 2023 7	Nice	0–0	Brest	Nice
15:00 CEST (UTC+2)	Atal (yellow card) 60'	Report	Mounié (yellow card) 5'; Camara (yellow card) 34'; Chardonnet (yellow card) 62'	Stadium: Allianz Riviera; Attendance: 32,044; Referee: Romain Lissorgue

7 October 2023 8	Metz	0–1	Nice	Metz
17:00 CEST (UTC+2)		Report	Boudaoui 14'; Thuram (yellow card) 21'	Stadium: Stade Saint-Symphorien; Attendance: 23,160; Referee: Jérôme Brisard

21 October 2023 9	Nice	1–0	Marseille	Nice
21:00 CEST (UTC+2)	Dante (yellow card) 15'; Boga (yellow card) 24'; Boudaoui (yellow card) 56'; Moffi (yellow card) 79'; Guessand 80'	Report	Balerdi (yellow card) 75' (yellow-red card) 78'; Murillo (yellow card) 90+5'	Stadium: Allianz Riviera; Attendance: 31,423; Referee: Ruddy Buquet

27 October 2023 10	Clermont	0–1	Nice	Clermont-Ferrand
21:00 CEST (UTC+2)		Report	Laborde (penalty missed) 37'; Perraud (yellow card) 61'; Sanson (yellow card) 64'; Boudaoui 74'	Stadium: Stade Gabriel-Montpied; Attendance: 10,140; Referee: Jérémie Pignard

5 November 2023 11	Nice	2–0	Rennes	Nice
20:45 CET (UTC+1)	Boga 45'; Ndayishimiye (red card) 75'; Mandanda 87' (o.g.)	Report	Assignon (yellow card) 17'; Truffert (yellow card) 68'; Omari (red card) 85'	Stadium: Allianz Riviera; Attendance: 22,430; Referee: Clément Turpin

10 November 2023 12	Montpellier	0–0	Nice	Montpellier
21:00 CET (UTC+1)		Report	Rosario (yellow card) 5'; Boudaoui (yellow card) 45+1'; Todibo (yellow card) 72'; Bard (yellow card) 82'	Stadium: Stade de la Mosson; Attendance: 13,452; Referee: Hakim Ben El Hadj

26 November 2023 13	Nice	1–0	Toulouse	Nice
13:00 CET (UTC+1)	Moffi 54'	Report	Cásseres (yellow card) 33'; Bangré (yellow card) 81'; Desler (yellow card) 83'; Gelabert (yellow card) 90+3'	Stadium: Allianz Riviera; Attendance: 21,849; Referee: François Letexier

2 December 2023 14	Nantes	1–0	Nice	Nantes
21:00 CET (UTC+1)	Castelletto (yellow card) 18'; Mollet 25'; Duverne (yellow card) 61'; Chirivella (yellow card) 89'	Report		Stadium: Stade de la Beaujoire; Attendance: 26,560; Referee: Ruddy Buquet

10 December 2023 15	Nice	2–1	Reims	Nice
13:00 CET (UTC+1)	Laborde 55'; Boga 82'; Ndayishimiye (yellow card) 84'; Bard (yellow card) 86'	Report	Foket (yellow card) 62'; Abdelhamid 78', (yellow card) 84'; Matusiwa (yellow card) 86'	Stadium: Allianz Riviera; Attendance: 24,325; Referee: Benoît Bastien

16 December 2023 16	Le Havre	3–1	Nice	Le Havre
17:00 CET (UTC+1)	Sabbi 5', 35', (yellow card) 27'; Bayo 51' (pen.); Targhalline (yellow card) 62'; Grandsir (yellow card) 81', (red card) 81'	Report	Bard (yellow card) 56'; Dante (yellow card) 79'; Todibo (red card) 81'; Louchet 90+1'	Stadium: Stade Océane; Attendance: 21,971; Referee: Jérémie Pignard

20 December 2023 17	Nice	2–0	Lens	Nice
21:00 CET (UTC+1)	Lotomba (yellow card) 26'; Moffi 76' (pen.), 78'; Dante (yellow card) 90+3'	Report	Khusanov (yellow card) 88'; Guilavogui (yellow card) 90+6'	Stadium: Allianz Riviera; Attendance: 25,041; Referee: Hakim Ben El Hadj

13 January 2024 18	Rennes	2–0	Nice	Rennes
21:00 CET (UTC+1)	Bourigeaud 31' (pen.); Kalimuendo 54'; Omari (yellow card) 79'	Report		Stadium: Roazhon Park; Attendance: 26,689; Referee: Bastien Dechepy

27 January 2024 19	Nice	1–0	Metz	Nice
17:00 CET (UTC+1)	Bard (yellow card) 61'; Guessand 77' (pen.)	Report	Sabaly (yellow card) 57'	Stadium: Allianz Riviera; Attendance: 20,137; Referee: Stéphanie Frappart

4 February 2024 20	Brest	0–0	Nice	Brest
17:05 CET (UTC+1)	Lees-Melou (yellow card) 45'; Camara (yellow card) 55'; Chardonnet (yellow card) 75'	Report	Ndayishimiye (yellow card) 74'	Stadium: Stade Francis-Le Blé; Attendance: 13,442; Referee: Jérémy Stinat

11 February 2024 21	Nice	2–3	Monaco	Nice
20:45 CET (UTC+1)	Lotomba (yellow card) 33'; Laborde 37' (pen.); Dante (red card) 54'; Louchet (yellow card) 60'; Boudaoui (yellow card) 67'; Guessand 74', (yellow card) 83'; Ndayishimiye (yellow card) 90+4'	Report	Zakaria 16', 50', (yellow card) 83'; Kehrer (yellow card) 35'; Golovin (yellow card) 43', (goal) 77'; Akliouche (yellow card) 90+8'	Stadium: Allianz Riviera; Attendance: 24,788; Referee: Eric Wattellier

16 February 2024 22	Lyon	1–0	Nice	Décines-Charpieu
21:00 CET (UTC+1)	Mangala 22'	Report	Ndayishimiye (yellow card) 9'	Stadium: Groupama Stadium; Attendance: 48,033; Referee: Clément Turpin

25 February 2024 23	Nice	0–0	Clermont	Nice
15:00 CET (UTC+1)	Thuram (yellow card) 8'; Dante (yellow card) 45+5'	Report	Gonalons (yellow card) 31'; Nicholson (penalty missed) 45+6'	Stadium: Allianz Riviera; Attendance: 22,081; Referee: Hakim Ben El Hadj

3 March 2024 24	Toulouse	2–1	Nice	Toulouse
13:00 CET (UTC+1)	Costa (yellow card) 45+2'; Dallinga 66'; Gboho 69'; Spierings (yellow card) 90+2'	Report	Thuram (yellow card) 2'; Moffi 8', (yellow card) 50'	Stadium: Stadium de Toulouse; Attendance: 25,507; Referee: Jérémie Pignard

8 March 2024 25	Nice	1–2	Montpellier	Nice
21:00 CET (UTC+1)	Boga 12'; Rosario (yellow card) 42'	Report	Todibo 10' (o.g.); Savanier 42' (pen.); Khazri (yellow card) 47'; Leroy (yellow card) 90+2'	Stadium: Allianz Riviera; Attendance: 21,819; Referee: Ruddy Buquet

16 March 2024 26	Lens	1–3	Nice	Lens
21:00 CET (UTC+1)	Aguilar (yellow card) 37'; Frankowski (yellow card) 62'; Khusanov (yellow card) 65'; Wahi 76'; Thomasson (yellow card) 89'	Report	Moffi 11', 67' (pen.); Thuram (yellow card) 40', (goal) 53'; Perraud (yellow card) 46'; Rosario (yellow card) 78'	Stadium: Stade Bollaert-Delelis; Attendance: 37,346; Referee: Benoît Bastien

31 March 2024 27	Nice	1–2	Nantes	Nice
15:00 CEST (UTC+2)	Lotomba (yellow card) 59'; Moffi 72' (pen.); Laborde (yellow card) 90+8'	Report	Abline 19', (yellow card) 78'; Cozza (yellow card) 51'; Cömert (yellow card) 52'; Chirivella (yellow card) 59'; Mohamed 77' (pen.); Coco (yellow card) 90+1'	Stadium: Allianz Riviera; Attendance: 21,142; Referee: Bastien Dechepy

7 April 2024 28	Reims	0–0	Nice	Reims
15:00 CEST (UTC+2)	Akieme (yellow card) 12'; Okumu (yellow card) 40'	Report	Boudaoui (yellow card) 50'	Stadium: Stade Auguste-Delaune; Attendance: 14,606; Referee: Eric Wattellier

19 April 2024 30	Nice	3–0	Lorient	Nice
21:00 CEST (UTC+2)	Sanson 22'; Boga 53'; Guessand 90'	Report	Bamba (yellow card) 5'; Kari (yellow card) 57'	Stadium: Allianz Riviera; Attendance: 21,067; Referee: Jérémy Stinat

24 April 2024 29	Marseille	2–2	Nice	Marseille
21:00 CEST (UTC+2)	Moumbagna (yellow card) 22' (yellow-red card) 45+2'; Clauss 31'; Aubameyang 56' (pen.)	Report	Moffi (yellow card) 11', (goal) 13'; Cho (yellow card) 54'; Sanson (yellow card) 61'; Bard 72'	Stadium: Stade Vélodrome; Attendance: 58,151; Referee: Jérémie Pignard
Note: The match was originally scheduled for 14 April 2024, but was postponed due to Marseille's progression in the UEFA Europa League.

28 April 2024 31	Strasbourg	1–3	Nice	Strasbourg
15:00 CEST (UTC+2)	Bakwa 18'; Andrey Santos (yellow card) 49'; Sylla (yellow card) 63'	Report	Cho (yellow card) 34'; Guessand 44' (pen.); Dante 52'; Sanson 84', (yellow card) 90+3'; Bard (yellow card) 85'	Stadium: Stade de la Meinau; Attendance: 25,181; Referee: Thomas Léonard

10 May 2024 33	Nice	1–0	Le Havre	Nice
21:00 CEST (UTC+2)	Boga 12'; Todibo (yellow card) 16'; Bard (yellow card) 65'	Report		Stadium: Allianz Riviera; Attendance: 24,529; Referee: Benoît Bastien

15 May 2024 32	Nice	1–2	Paris Saint-Germain	Nice
21:00 CEST (UTC+2)	Cho 32'; Bard (red card) 75'; Rosario (yellow card) 90+3'	Report	Barcola 18'; Zague (yellow card) 20', (goal) 23'; Beraldo (yellow card) 26'; Marquinhos (yellow card) 33'	Stadium: Allianz Riviera; Attendance: 33,818; Referee: Ruddy Buquet
Note: The match was originally scheduled for 3 May 2024, but was postponed due to Paris Saint-Germain's progression in the UEFA Champions League.

19 May 2024 34	Lille	2–2	Nice	Villeneuve-d'Ascq
21:00 CEST (UTC+2)	Haraldsson 54', (yellow card) 58'; Alexsandro (yellow card) 61'; André 72', (yellow card) 90+1'; Zhegrova (red card) 90+8'	Report	Laborde 10'; Claude-Maurice (yellow card) 65'; Thuram (yellow card) 76'; Lotomba 90+4'; Bułka (yellow card) 90+10'	Stadium: Stade Pierre-Mauroy; Attendance: 45,488; Referee: Willy Delajod
Note: Zhegrova received a red card after already being substituted out of the match.

=== Coupe de France ===
6 January 2024 Round of 64	Nice	0–0 (4–2 p)	Auxerre	Nice
20:45 CET (UTC+1)	Rosario (yellow card) 89'	Report	Jubal (yellow card) 17'	Stadium: Allianz Riviera; Attendance: 20,973; Referee: Eric Wattellier
	Penalties
	Guessand (penalty missed); Moffi (penalty scored); Rosario (penalty scored); Lotomba (penalty scored); Laborde (penalty scored)		(penalty scored) Jubal; (penalty scored) Raveloson; (penalty missed) Onaiwu; (penalty missed) Perrin

20 January 2024 Round of 32	Bordeaux	2–3	Nice	Bordeaux
17:30 CET (UTC+1)	Livolant 59'; Weissbeck 76'	Report	Guessand 36'; Todibo (yellow card) 45'; Sanson 47' (pen.), 60'; Rosario (yellow card) 70'; Bułka (yellow card) 90+2'	Stadium: Matmut Atlantique; Attendance: 22,969; Referee: Thomas Léonard

7 February 2024 Round of 16	Montpellier	1–4	Nice	Montpellier
20:30 CET (UTC+1)	Savanier (yellow card) 34'; Lecomte (yellow card) 64'; Ndiaye (penalty missed) 74'; Sagnan 74'	Report	Ndayishimiye 29'; Claude-Maurice (yellow card) 34', (goal) 62' (pen.); Louchet 37'; Cho 39'; Rosario (yellow card) 46'; Baldé (yellow card) 71'	Stadium: Stade de la Mosson; Attendance: 5,769; Referee: François Letexier

13 March 2024 Quarter-finals	Paris Saint-Germain	3–1	Nice	Paris
21:10 CET (UTC+1)	K. Mbappé 14'; Fabián 33'; Beraldo 60'	Report	Laborde 37'	Stadium: Parc des Princes; Attendance: 47,619; Referee: François Letexier

== Statistics ==
=== Appearances and goals ===
No.	Pos	Nat	Player	Total		Ligue 1		Coupe de France	
No.	Pos	Nat	Player	Apps	Goals	Apps	Goals	Apps	Goals
Goalkeepers
1	GK	(Poland) POL	Marcin Bułka	17	0	17	0	0	0
40	GK	(Algeria) ALG	Teddy Boulhendi	0	0	0	0	0	0
Defenders
4	DF	(Brazil) BRA	Dante	17	0	17	0	0	0
6	DF	(France) FRA	Jean-Clair Todibo	14	0	14	0	0	0
15	DF	(France) FRA	Romain Perraud	11	0	0+11	0	0	0
20	DF	(Algeria) ALG	Youcef Atal	6	1	5+1	1	0	0
23	DF	(Switzerland) SUI	Jordan Lotomba	13	0	8+5	0	0	0
26	DF	(France) FRA	Melvin Bard	17	0	17	0	0	0
33	DF	(France) FRA	Antoine Mendy	2	0	1+1	0	0	0
34	DF	(France) FRA	Yannis Nahounou	0	0	0	0	0	0
38	DF	(Morocco) MAR	Ayoub Amraoui	0	0	0	0	0	0
55	DF	(Burundi) BDI	Youssouf Ndayishimiye	14	0	14	0	0	0
Midfielders
7	MF	(Ivory Coast) CIV	Jérémie Boga	15	3	12+3	3	0	0
8	MF	(Netherlands) NED	Pablo Rosario	15	0	9+6	0	0	0
10	MF	(France) FRA	Sofiane Diop	9	0	6+3	0	0	0
11	MF	(France) FRA	Morgan Sanson	17	0	14+3	0	0	0
19	MF	(France) FRA	Khéphren Thuram	12	0	11+1	0	0	0
21	MF	(France) FRA	Alexis Beka Beka	0	0	0	0	0	0
22	MF	(Algeria) ALG	Badredine Bouanani	6	0	1+5	0	0	0
28	MF	(Algeria) ALG	Hicham Boudaoui	15	2	8+7	2	0	0
32	MF	(France) FRA	Tom Alexis Louchet	4	1	0+4	1	0	0
37	MF	(France) FRA	Reda Belahyane	0	0	0	0	0	0
Forwards
9	FW	(Nigeria) NGR	Terem Moffi	16	6	13+3	6	0	0
18	FW	(France) FRA	Alexis Claude-Maurice	7	0	0+7	0	0	0
24	FW	(France) FRA	Gaëtan Laborde	17	3	15+2	3	0	0
27	FW	(Senegal) SEN	Aliou Baldé	3	0	0+3	0	0	0
29	FW	(Ivory Coast) CIV	Evann Guessand	17	2	5+12	2	0	0
Players transferred out during the season
16	GK	(Italy) ITA	Salvatore Sirigu	0	0	0	0	0	0

Last updated: 20 December 2023
Source: Competitions
