= Youssoufa Moukoko =

Footballer (born 2004)

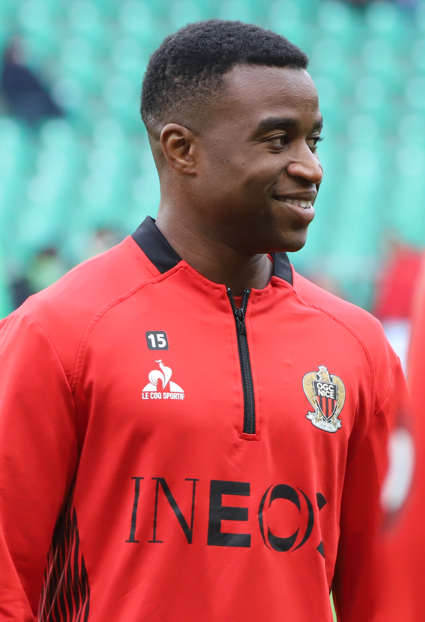
- Moukoko with Nice in 2025

Personal information
- Full name: Youssoufa Moukoko
- Date of birth: 20 November 2004 (age 21)
- Place of birth: Yaoundé, Cameroon
- Height: 1.79 m (5 ft 10 in)
- Position: Striker

Team information
- Current team: Çorum (on loan from Copenhagen)

Youth career
- 2014–2016: FC St. Pauli
- 2016–2020: Borussia Dortmund

Senior career*
Years	Team	Apps	(Gls)
2020–2025	Borussia Dortmund	76	(17)
2021–2022	Borussia Dortmund II	2	(1)
2024–2025	→ Nice (loan)	11	(2)
2025–	Copenhagen	26	(9)
2026–	→ Çorum (loan)	7	(1)

International career
2017	Germany U16	4	(3)
2020	Germany U20	2	(0)
2021–2024	Germany U21	15	(13)
2022	Germany	2	(0)
Medal record
Men's football
Representing Germany
UEFA European Under-21 Championship
Winner	2021
- * Club domestic league appearances and goals as of 22:38, 5 November 2026 (UTC)

Youssoufa Moukoko (born 20 November 2004 (Note: Disputed)) is a professional footballer who plays as a striker for Süper Lig club Çorum, on loan from Danish Superliga club Copenhagen. Born in Cameroon and holding German and Cameroonian nationality, he has represented the Germany national team.

Moukoko became one of the most closely watched teenagers in European football while playing several years above his registered age group in the Borussia Dortmund academy, where he scored 83 goals in 50 Under 17 Bundesliga matches and a divisional record 34 in 20 in the Under 19 Bundesliga. The DFL lowered its minimum age for senior registration in 2020 following a Dortmund proposal, and on 21 November that year, a day after his sixteenth birthday, he became the youngest player in Bundesliga history. Within a month he had also become the youngest player in the UEFA Champions League and the youngest scorer in the Bundesliga.

The senior career that followed did not sustain that trajectory. Behind Erling Haaland and later Niclas Füllkrug at Dortmund, he started rarely, and a loan to Nice in 2024–25 ended with him out of the matchday squad altogether. He rebuilt at Copenhagen, whom he joined in 2025 and for whom he was leading scorer in his first season with 18 goals, though largely from the bench. He won the DFB-Pokal with Dortmund in 2021 and was named in Germany's squad for the 2022 FIFA World Cup at seventeen.

His recorded date of birth has been disputed since 2017. Investigative reporting by Der Spiegel and a 2024 ProSieben documentary, in which the man registered as his father swore that Moukoko was born four years earlier than stated, prompted a criminal inquiry in Hamburg. If that account is correct, the age records would not stand.

== Early life ==
Moukoko spent his first ten years in the Briqueterie quarter of Yaoundé, the Cameroonian capital. He has said he played no organised football there, only in the street, and that he decided at four to become a footballer after watching the 2009 Champions League semi-final between Chelsea and Barcelona on television.

Joseph Moukoko, born 1951, a Cameroonian who had lived in Hamburg as a German citizen since the 1990s, brought him to Germany in the summer of 2014. The nature of that relationship became the central question in the later dispute over his age.

== Club career ==
=== Youth ===
Moukoko joined the under-13 side of FC St. Pauli in October 2014. The outdoor season had finished, so his first months were spent in indoor tournaments, where he was repeatedly top scorer. He was moved up to the under-15 side at eleven and scored 23 goals in 13 matches.

Borussia Dortmund signed him for their academy in July 2016. He scored 33 in 21 for the under-15s in his first season, then entered the Under 17 Bundesliga West in 2017–18 as the division's only thirteen-year-old, finishing as its top scorer with 40 goals in 28 games and scoring the winner in the national under-17 final against Bayern Munich. He was top scorer again the following season with 46 in 25, passing Donis Avdijaj's divisional record of 44.

Promotion to the under-19s at fourteen changed nothing. He scored six on his debut in a 9–2 win over Wuppertaler SV, passed Haluk Türkeri's fifteen-year-old league record of 33 goals by the twentieth matchday, and finished a season curtailed by the COVID-19 pandemic with 34 in 20, twenty-one clear of the next-highest scorer in the division. He became the youngest player to appear in the UEFA Youth League against Barcelona in September 2019 and its youngest scorer against Inter Milan five weeks later.

By the autumn of 2020 kicker judged him "almost grotesquely under-challenged" in youth football, noting that he had scored ten goals in three under-19 league appearances and three more in a cup tie.

=== Borussia Dortmund ===
==== Record debut (2020–21) ====
In April 2020 the DFL assembly approved a Dortmund proposal allowing registration for the Bundesliga at sixteen rather than seventeen. Without it Moukoko would have been ineligible until 2021–22. He trained with the first team under Lucien Favre from the start of the season but could not play, in competitive matches or friendlies, until his birthday fell in the eighth week of the campaign.

That October, during an under-19 fixture at Schalke 04 in which he scored three times, he was abused by opposition supporters. A joint investigation by the club and the DFB did not substantiate a racist content to the chanting, but the association fined Schalke for the continued unsporting conduct of its supporters and for inadequate stewarding.

He came on for Erling Haaland at Hertha BSC on 21 November, five minutes from the end of a 5–2 win, and displaced Nuri Şahin as the youngest player in Bundesliga history. Seventeen days later he became the youngest player in Champions League history against Zenit Saint Petersburg, at 16 years and 18 days. On 18 December, in a defeat at Union Berlin, he scored at 16 years and 28 days to succeed Florian Wirtz as the Bundesliga's youngest scorer, a record Wirtz had held for six months.

The season yielded 14 league appearances, only one of them a start, and three goals under Favre and his successor Edin Terzić. It ended in late March when he damaged ankle ligaments in training with the under-21 squad.

==== Behind the queue (2021–22) ====
Marco Rose's arrival did not improve his standing. Ranked behind Haaland, Donyell Malen and at times Steffen Tigges, he made 16 league appearances and scored twice, and from November was also fielded for the reserve side in the 3. Liga. He collected a DFB-Pokal winner's medal, his first senior honour.

==== Breakthrough and stall (2022–24) ====
Haaland's move to England and the cancer diagnosis of his replacement Sébastien Haller opened the position. Moukoko was directly involved in all three goals of a 3–1 win over SC Freiburg on the second matchday, headed the only goal of the Revierderby against Schalke in September, and scored twice against VfL Bochum, performances for which kicker gave him a rating of 1.5 on each occasion. He reached the winter break with six goals and six assists, a return bettered in the squad only by Jude Bellingham, and in January signed a contract to June 2026 after interest from several Premier League clubs.

The second half of that season set the pattern for the two that followed. A month-long injury and the settling of a front three of Malen, Haller and Karim Adeyemi reduced him to substitute appearances, though he rounded Frederik Rønnow to win a title-race fixture against Union Berlin on his fiftieth league outing. In 2023–24 he started only in the cup before December, went three consecutive matchdays without appearing at all, and sustained a thigh injury in the cup exit that kept him out until January. He played seventeen minutes of Dortmund's run to the Champions League final. After the club signed Maximilian Beier and Serhou Guirassy he was omitted from the squad for the opening fixtures of 2024–25.

==== Nice (loan) ====
Moukoko joined Nice on loan for the 2024–25 season on 28 August 2024, the agreement carrying an option to buy. He made his first start on 20 September in an 8–0 win over Saint-Étienne, the heaviest home victory of the Ligue 1 season, scoring twice and creating a third goal.

He neither scored nor assisted again in France, finishing the Ligue 1 season with 199 minutes, two goals and two assists. Franck Haise suggested in the autumn that the forward might be more comfortable if the team played with two strikers, and later said that a player unable to draw attention to himself could not be preferred to others. His final appearance came on 5 February 2025, when Haise gave him five minutes of a 2–1 defeat at fourth-tier Stade Briochin in the Coupe de France last 16. He did not play again before the end of the season. Nice declined the reported €18 million purchase option. Moukoko later told kicker that the loan had been the best thing that could have happened to him, saying he had learned patience and to look first at himself rather than blame the coach.

=== Copenhagen ===
Copenhagen signed Moukoko on 28 June 2025 on a five-year contract running to 2030, and gave him the number 9 shirt. The signing fee was reported to be about €5 million, which made him the third most expensive signing in the club's history. He scored on his eighth appearance, heading the equaliser in a 3–1 win at Nordsjælland on 15 August 2025. Twelve days later he came off the bench in the second leg of the Champions League play-off against Basel and converted a late penalty won by Viktor Claesson, completing a 2–0 win and a 3–1 aggregate victory that took Copenhagen into the league phase for the third time in four seasons.

Copenhagen finished 31st of the 36 teams in the league phase and were eliminated, Moukoko scoring once in the competition. Domestic form was worse. The club won only eight of its 22 matches in the regular Superliga season and entered the relegation round for the first time, Moukoko appearing in 18 of those games and scoring three times. His most productive night of the autumn came in the Danish Cup, where a hat-trick in a 4–1 win at Hobro on 29 October ended a run of five matches without a victory.

Jacob Neestrup was dismissed on 29 March 2026 after a single point from eight matches. Moukoko scored a hat-trick in his replacement Bo Svensson's first match, a 7–0 win over Silkeborg on 5 April that equalled the record victory in Superliga history. He went on to score six goals in the six matches of the relegation round, which Copenhagen won.

Why a player scoring at that rate started so seldom became a recurring theme in the Danish press. Figures from Opta published by Tipsbladet in May 2026 showed that among Superliga players with at least 1,100 minutes, only Franculino of Midtjylland bettered Moukoko's 0.57 goals and 0.58 expected goals per 90 minutes. He played one minute of the cup final on 14 May, a 1–0 defeat to Midtjylland. A week later he came off the bench in the European play-off at Brøndby and scored twice in extra time in a 3–1 win that sent Copenhagen into the second qualifying round of the Conference League. He ended the season as the club's leading scorer with 18 goals in 41 matches.

==== Çorum (loan) ====
On 1 September 2026, Copenhagen loaned Moukoko to newly promoted Süper Lig club Çorum for the remainder of the season, with an option to buy. Copenhagen director of football Kristjaan Speakman said Moukoko had wanted playing time the club could not guarantee, and that the choice had been between competing for a starting place and a loan offering more minutes. Bo Svensson said his own reasons for leaving the forward out had been entirely tactical. Sky Sports suggested that Moukoko had "lost his way" in his career.

== International career ==
Moukoko debuted for the Germany under-16 side on 11 September 2017 in a 3–1 win over Austria and scored both goals against the same opponent two days later, the youngest player to have represented the team. In October, Dortmund and the DFB agreed not to select him further for the time being in order to limit the attention on him.

He was called up to the under-19s in February 2020, though the fixtures fell to the pandemic, and debuted for the under-20s that September at fifteen. Named in the under-21 squad for the 2021 UEFA European Under-21 Championship as the youngest player selected, he was injured in training and did not play as Germany won the tournament. His debut came on 2 September 2021 against San Marino, with two goals, making him the youngest to play for and score for the side.

On the strength of his autumn form for Dortmund and three goals in three under-21 matches during 2022, Hansi Flick named him in Germany's World Cup squad. He and Füllkrug were the only uncapped players in it. He debuted on 16 November in a 1–0 friendly win over Oman, at 17 years and 361 days Germany's fourth-youngest senior international behind Willy Baumgärtner, Marius Hiller and Uwe Seeler. He came on in stoppage time of the opening defeat to Japan and did not feature again, Flick preferring Füllkrug, Thomas Müller and Kai Havertz as Germany went out in the group stage.

He was in the squad for the 2023 UEFA European Under-21 Championship, where he missed a penalty in a 1–1 draw with Israel and received kicker's lowest rating of any player on the pitch, then withdrew with a thigh problem. He scored six goals in the first six qualifiers for the 2025 tournament before dropping out of the squad.

== Style of play ==
A left-footed striker of modest build, Moukoko is a penalty-area finisher rather than a focal point. His shot volume and conversion have been consistently high at every level, and the Opta figures from his first Copenhagen season placed him second in the division for both goals and expected goals per 90 minutes. His youth record rested less on physical advantage than on movement and finishing, since he was habitually the smallest and youngest player on the pitch.

The recurring reason given for leaving him out has been the same at three clubs. Svensson explained a run of omissions by saying he wanted a big striker on the last line as a threat from crosses, which was not Moukoko's strength. Haise at Nice made a comparable judgement in favour of the more physically imposing Guessand. Otto Addo, then Dortmund's talent manager, praised his willingness to put in additional individual training sessions and to seek out coaching staff himself, and Mike Tullberg made him under-19 captain, describing him as a model in many respects.

== Age and identity ==
Questions about Moukoko's recorded date of birth have been raised in the German press since 2017. His birth was entered in the register at the Hamburg-Harburg civil registry office in 2016 with the date given as 20 November 2004, on the basis of a certificate that Joseph Moukoko said he had obtained at the German consulate in Yaoundé shortly after the birth.

In November 2022 Der Spiegel reported that Joseph Moukoko had travelled to Cameroon as a talent scout and adopted Youssoufa in order to bring him to Germany more easily, and that in September 2022 he had sent a journalist a copy of a birth certificate issued in Yaoundé on 17 July 2000 in the name Youssoufa Mohamadou. The magazine observed that such documents can be obtained through corruption in a number of countries, and that a lowered age secures more lucrative contracts.

Joseph and Youssoufa Moukoko obtained an injunction from the Frankfurt regional court on 15 November 2022 restraining publication of the certificate, Joseph Moukoko swearing an affidavit that Youssoufa was his biological son born on the registered date. The court subsequently reversed itself and found the ban unjustified. On 8 May 2024 the Frankfurt higher regional court granted an urgent application restraining Der Spiegel from repeating several claims, but did so on procedural grounds, because Moukoko had not been given adequate opportunity to respond beforehand, while holding that the minimum evidential threshold for suspicion reporting had been met.

In December 2024 ProSieben broadcast a documentary in which Joseph Moukoko swore a second and contradictory affidavit, stating that he was not Youssoufa's biological father, that Youssoufa had been born on 19 July 2000, and that he had arranged a birth certificate with false particulars in Yaoundé and used it to obtain a passport. Other interviewees also said he was not the biological father and that the family name was Mohamadou. The Hamburg public prosecutor confirmed that it was examining an initial suspicion of making a false statement under oath.

Youssoufa Moukoko has not been charged with any offence and has not publicly accepted the alternative date.

== Media and public profile ==
Moukoko was described as a Wunderkind in the German press from the age of twelve, a framing that drew coverage from outlets across Europe well before he had played a senior match. He signed a boot deal with Nike reported to be worth millions in 2019, while still living in the Dortmund youth hostel and on a trainee contract running to 2022. In 2021 The Guardian included him among sixty players on its Next Generation list.

The DFL's decision to lower its age threshold, taken on a Dortmund proposal that would benefit one player, prompted debate in Germany about the exposure of children to professional football. By 2025, after the Nice loan, the tone had inverted, with n-tv and Sportschau running pieces on the disappearance from view of a player still only twenty.

== Personal life ==
Moukoko is a practising Muslim. He is reported to have four siblings. Borel Moukoko, born 2000, who came to Germany in December 2016 and played as a full-back in the Oberliga Niederrhein, has said publicly that he has a different mother, and Der Spiegel left open whether the two are related by adoption.

== Career statistics ==
=== Club ===
As of match played 11 October 2026

Appearances and goals by club, season and competition
Club	Season	League			National cup (Note: Includes DFB-Pokal, Coupe de France, Danish Cup)		Europe		Other		Total	
Club	Season	Division	Apps	Goals	Apps	Goals	Apps	Goals	Apps	Goals	Apps	Goals
Borussia Dortmund	2020–21	Bundesliga	14	3	0	0	1 (Note: Appearance(s) in UEFA Champions League)	0	0	0	15	3
Borussia Dortmund	2021–22	Bundesliga	16	2	2	0	3 (Note: One appearance in UEFA Champions League, two appearances in UEFA Europa League)	0	1 (Note: Appearance in DFL-Supercup)	0	22	2
Borussia Dortmund	2022–23	Bundesliga	26	7	3	0	6	0	—		35	7
Borussia Dortmund	2023–24	Bundesliga	20	5	3	1	4	0	—		27	6
Borussia Dortmund	Total		76	17	8	1	14	0	1	0	99	18
Nice (loan)	2024–25	Ligue 1	11	2	3	0	8 (Note: Appearances in UEFA Europa League)	0	—		22	2
Copenhagen	2025–26	Danish Superliga	24	9	5	6	11	1	1 (Note: Appearance in Danish Superliga European play-off)	2	41	18
Copenhagen	2026–27	Danish Superliga	2	0	—		3 (Note: Appearances in UEFA Conference League)	0	—		5	0
Copenhagen	Total		26	9	5	6	14	1	1	2	46	18
Çorum (loan)	2026–27	Süper Lig	4	0	0	0	—		—		4	0
Career total			117	28	16	7	36	1	2	2	171	38

=== International ===
Appearances and goals by national team and year
National team	Year	Apps	Goals
Germany
Germany	2022	2	0
Total		2	0

== Honours ==
Borussia Dortmund

- DFB-Pokal: 2020–21

Germany U21

- UEFA European Under-21 Championship: 2021

Individual

- Fritz Walter Medal U17 Gold: 2021
- Fritz Walter Medal U19 Gold: 2023
