= Orakpo =

Orakpo is a surname. Notable people with the surname include:

- Brian Orakpo (born 1986), American professional football player
- Victor Orakpo (born 2006), Nigerian professional footballer
