= Melvin Bard =

French footballer (born 2000)

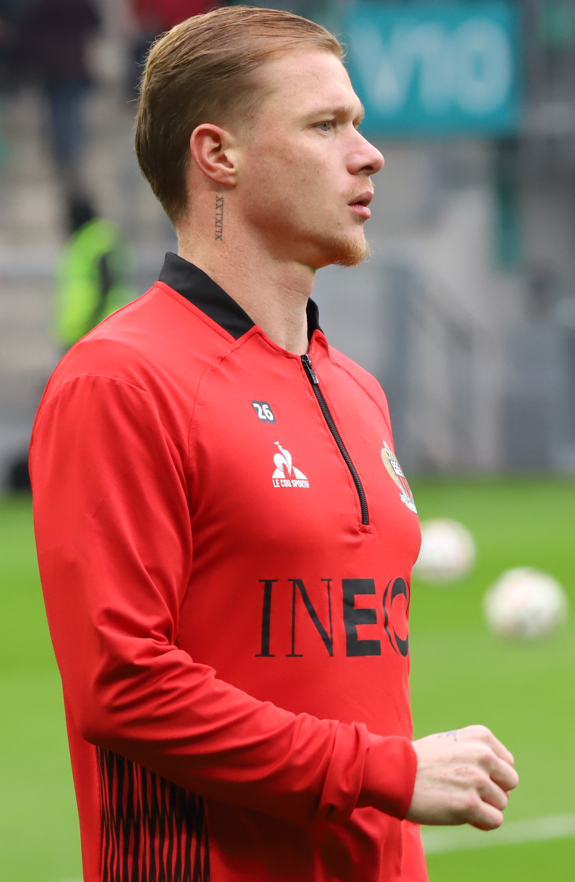
- Bard with Nice in 2025

Personal information
- Full name: Melvin Michel Maxence Bard
- Date of birth: 6 November 2000 (age 26)
- Place of birth: Écully, France
- Height: 1.73 m (5 ft 8 in)
- Positions: Left wing-back; left-back

Team information
- Current team: Leeds United (on loan from Nice)
- Number: 26

Youth career
- 2006–2009: FCPA
- 2009–2016: FC Domtac
- 2016–2019: Lyon

Senior career*
| Years | Team | Apps | (Gls) |
| 2017–2020 | Lyon B | 34 | (1) |
| 2019–2021 | Lyon | 15 | (0) |
| 2021– | Nice | 154 | (7) |
| 2026– | → Leeds United (loan) | 1 | (0) |

International career
| 2017 | France U17 | 1 | (0) |
| 2017–2018 | France U18 | 6 | (0) |
| 2019 | France U19 | 4 | (0) |
| 2019 | France U20 | 2 | (0) |
| 2020–2021 | France U21 | 3 | (0) |
| 2021 | France Olympic | 3 | (0) |
- * Club domestic league appearances and goals as of 22:00, 14 September 2026 (UTC)

Melvin Michel Maxence Bard (born 6 November 2000) is a French professional footballer who plays as left-back or left wing-back for Premier League club Leeds United, on loan from Ligue 1 club Nice.

== Club career ==
=== Lyon ===
On 13 August 2019, Bard signed his first professional contract with Lyon. He made his professional debut with Lyon in a 4–0 Ligue 1 win over Nîmes on 6 December 2019.

=== Nice ===
On 31 July 2021, Ligue 1 side Nice announced the signing of Bard from Lyon. Later that year, on 2 October, he scored his first goal for the club in a 2–1 victory over Brest.

==== Loan to Leeds United ====
On 1 September 2026, Bard joined Premier League club Leeds United on loan for the 2026–27 season.

== Career statistics ==
As of match played 9 September 2026

Appearances and goals by club, season and competition
| Club | Season | League | | | National cup (Note: Includes Coupe de France) | | League cup (Note: Includes EFL Cup) | | Europe | | Other | | Total | |
| Club | Season | Division | Apps | Goals | Apps | Goals | Apps | Goals | Apps | Goals | Apps | Goals | Apps | Goals |
|---|---|---|---|---|---|---|---|---|---|---|---|---|---|---|
| Lyon II | 2017–18 | National 2 | 8 | 0 | — | | — | | — | | — | | 8 | 0 |
| Lyon II | 2018–19 | National 2 | 8 | 0 | — | | — | | — | | — | | 8 | 0 |
| Lyon II | Total | | 16 | 0 | — | | — | | — | | — | | 16 | 0 |
| Lyon | 2019–20 | Ligue 1 | 1 | 0 | 0 | 0 | 0 | 0 | — | | — | | 1 | 0 |
| Lyon | 2020–21 | Ligue 1 | 14 | 0 | 4 | 0 | — | | — | | — | | 18 | 0 |
| Lyon | Total | | 15 | 0 | 4 | 0 | — | | — | | — | | 19 | 0 |
| Nice | 2021–22 | Ligue 1 | 33 | 2 | 4 | 0 | — | | — | | — | | 37 | 2 |
| Nice | 2022–23 | Ligue 1 | 33 | 0 | 1 | 0 | — | | 10 (Note: Appearances in UEFA Europa Conference League) | 0 | — | | 44 | 0 |
| Nice | 2023–24 | Ligue 1 | 32 | 1 | 2 | 0 | — | | — | | — | | 34 | 1 |
| Nice | 2024–25 | Ligue 1 | 25 | 2 | 3 | 0 | — | | 4 (Note: Appearances in UEFA Europa League) | 0 | — | | 32 | 2 |
| Nice | 2025–26 | Ligue 1 | 29 | 2 | 5 | 0 | — | | 8 (Note: Two appearances in UEFA Champions League, six appearances in UEFA Europa League) | 0 | 2 (Note: Appearances in Ligue 1 relegation/promotion play-offs) | 0 | 44 | 2 |
| Nice | 2026–27 | Ligue 1 | 2 | 0 | — | | — | | — | | — | | 2 | 0 |
| Nice | Total | | 154 | 7 | 15 | 0 | — | | 22 | 0 | 2 | 0 | 193 | 7 |
| Leeds United (loan) | 2026–27 | Premier League | 2 | 0 | 0 | 0 | 1 | 0 | — | | — | | 3 | 0 |
| Career total | | | 187 | 7 | 19 | 0 | 1 | 0 | 22 | 0 | 2 | 0 | 231 | 7 |

== Honours ==
Nice

- Coupe de France runner-up: 2021–22, 2025–26
