= Tom Louchet =

French footballer (born 2003)

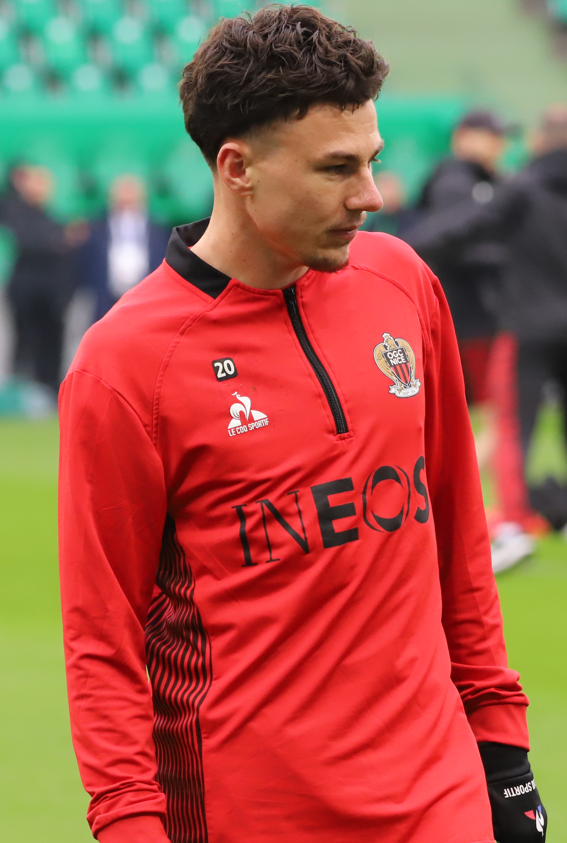
- Louchet with Nice in 2025

Personal information
- Full name: Tom Alexis Louchet
- Date of birth: 4 May 2003 (age 23)
- Place of birth: Manosque, France
- Height: 1.78 m (5 ft 10 in)
- Position: Central midfielder

Team information
- Current team: PAOK
- Number: 23

Youth career
- 2009–2012: SC Volxien
- 2012–2013: Manosque
- 2013–2014: SC Volxien
- 2014–2016: US Vivo 04
- 2016–2018: Gap Foot 05
- 2018–2019: Istres
- 2019–2021: Nice

Senior career*
Years	Team	Apps	(Gls)
2019–2023	Nice B	46	(4)
2023–2026	Nice	62	(5)
2026–	PAOK	1	(0)

International career
2020	France U17	2	(0)
- * Club domestic league appearances and goals as of 23 August 2026

Tom Alexis Louchet (born 4 May 2003) is a French professional footballer who plays as a midfielder for Super League Greece club PAOK.

== Club career ==
Originally from Manosque in the Provence region of France, Louchet spent his youth career at SC Volxien, EP Manosque, US Vivo 04, Gap Foot 05, and Istres. He joined Nice in July 2019, where he made his debut with the reserve team in the Championnat National 3 several months later.

On 27 October 2023, Louchet made his professional debut with Nice, coming on as an 88th-minute substitute in a 1–0 win away to Clermont in Ligue 1. He scored his first goal in a 3–1 defeat away to Le Havre on 16 December 2023.

On 4 August 2026, Louchet signed for Super League Greece club PAOK.

== International career ==
Born in France, Louchet is of Algerian descent. He has represented France at youth international level, playing two matches for the under-17s in February 2020.

== Career statistics ==
As of match played 29 May 2026

Appearances and goals by club, season and competition
Club	Season	League			Cup		Europe		Other		Total	
Club	Season	Division	Apps	Goals	Apps	Goals	Apps	Goals	Apps	Goals	Apps	Goals
Nice II	2019–20	Championnat National 3	5	0	—		—		—		5	0
Nice II	2020–21	Championnat National 3	2	0	—		—		—		2	0
Nice II	2021–22	Championnat National 3	23	3	—		—		—		23	3
Nice II	2022–23	Championnat National 3	16	1	—		—		—		16	1
Nice II	Total		46	4	—		—		—		46	4
Nice	2023–24	Ligue 1	13	1	3	1	—		—		16	2
Nice	2024–25	Ligue 1	22	1	2	1	7 (Note: Appearances in UEFA Europa League)	0	—		31	2
Nice	2025–26	Ligue 1	27	3	5	0	9 (Note: Two appearances in UEFA Champions League, seven appearances in UEFA Europa League)	0	1 (Note: Appearance in Ligue 1 relegation/promotion play-offs)	0	42	3
Nice	Total		62	5	10	2	16	0	1	0	89	7
Career total			108	9	10	2	16	0	1	0	135	11

== Honours ==
Nice

- Coupe de France runner-up: 2025–26
