= Antoine Mendy (footballer) =

Footballer (born 2004)

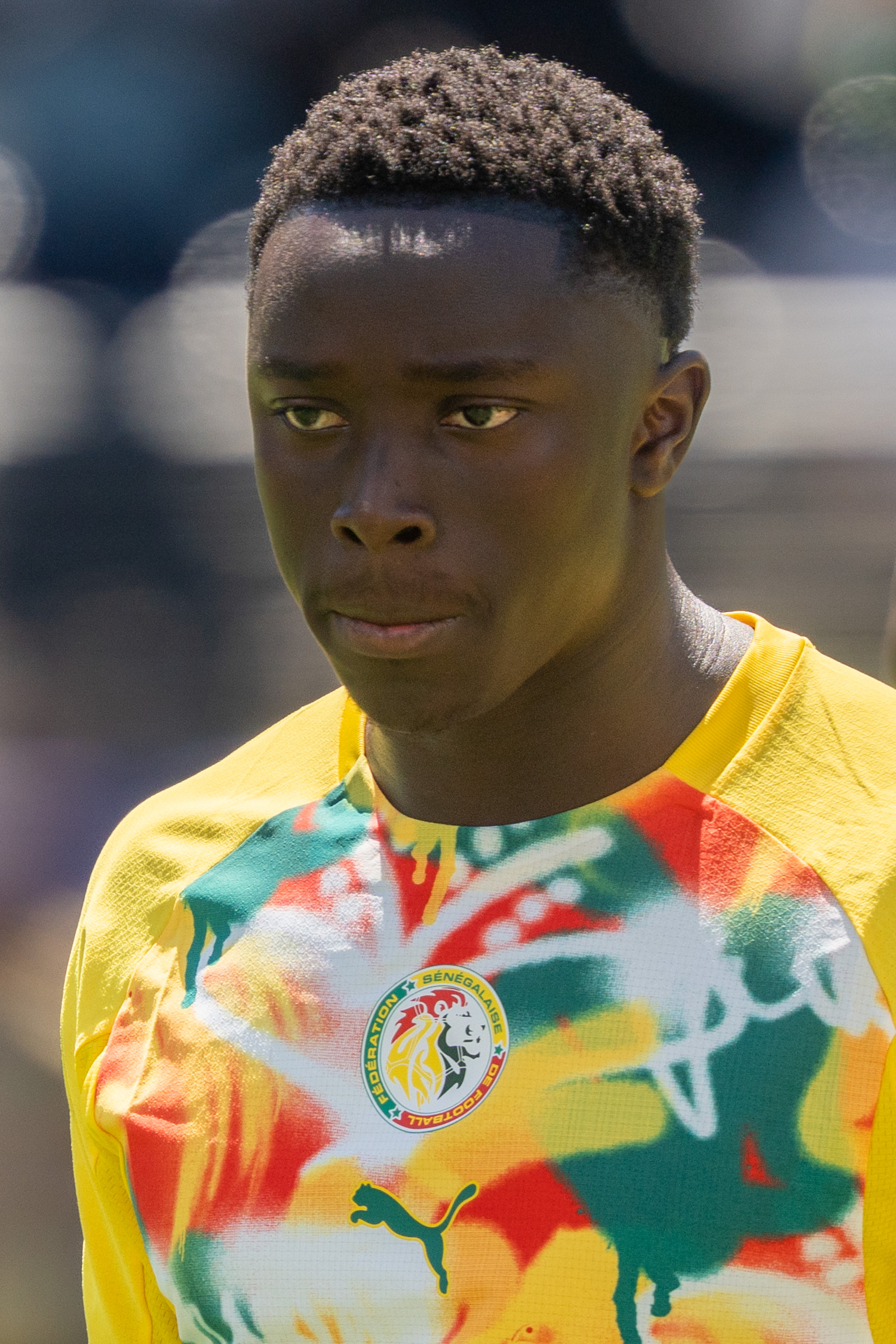
- Mendy with Senegal in 2026

Personal information
- Full name: Antoine Alpha Mendy
- Date of birth: 27 May 2004 (age 22)
- Place of birth: Marseille, France
- Height: 1.87 m (6 ft 2 in)
- Positions: Right-back; centre back

Team information
- Current team: Nice
- Number: 33

Youth career
- 2014–2021: Nice

Senior career*
Years	Team	Apps	(Gls)
2021–	Nice II	19	(2)
2022–	Nice	67	(1)

International career^{‡}
2024	France U20	1	(0)
2025–	Senegal	7	(0)
Medal record
Men's football
Representing Senegal
Africa Cup of Nations
Runner-up	2025 Morocco
- * Club domestic league appearances and goals as of 5 September 2026 ‡ National team caps and goals as of 9 June 2026

Antoine Alpha Mendy (born 27 May 2004) is a professional footballer who plays as a right-back and centre-back for Ligue 1 club Nice. Born in France, he plays for the Senegal national team.

== Club career ==
Mendy is a youth product of Nice since the age of 10, and worked his way up their youth categories. He began his senior career with their reserves in 2021, and signed his first professional contract with the club on 29 September 2022.

He made his professional and Ligue 1 with Nice as a late substitute in a 1–1 win over Auxerre on 16 October 2022.

In October 2025, he was listed as one of the ESPN soccer's next generation of entertainers.

== International career ==
Antoine Mendy received his first call-up to the Senegal national team in 22 March 2025 to take part in the 2026 FIFA World Cup qualifiers.

He made his debut as a starter in a goalless draw against Sudan, then came on as a substitute against Togo, earning praise for his defensive solidity.

On May 21, 2026, Mendy was officially selected by Senegal's coach Pape Thiaw from his list of 28 players to participate in the 2026 FIFA World Cup.

== Personal life ==
Born in France, Mendy is of Senegalese descent.

== Career statistics ==
=== Club ===
As of match played 5 September 2026

Appearances and goals by club, season and competition
Club	Season	League			National cup		Europe		Other		Total	
Club	Season	Division	Apps	Goals	Apps	Goals	Apps	Goals	Apps	Goals	Apps	Goals
Nice II	2021–22	Championnat National 2	16	2	—		—		—		16	2
Nice II	2022–23	Championnat National 2	3	0	—		—		—		3	0
Nice II	Total		19	2	—		—		—		19	2
Nice	2021–22	Ligue 1	0	0	0	0	—		—		0	0
Nice	2022–23	Ligue 1	11	0	1	0	3 (Note: Appearances in UEFA Europa Conference League)	0	—		15	0
Nice	2023–24	Ligue 1	10	0	3	0	—		—		13	0
Nice	2024–25	Ligue 1	18	0	2	0	3 (Note: Appearance in UEFA Europa League)	0	—		23	0
Nice	2025–26	Ligue 1	25	1	4	1	9 (Note: Two appearances in UEFA Champions League, seven appearances in UEFA Europa League)	0	2 (Note: Appearances in Ligue 1 relegation/promotion play-offs)	0	40	2
Nice	2026–27	Ligue 1	3	0	0	0	—		—		3	0
Nice	Total		67	1	10	1	15	0	2	0	94	2
Career total			85	3	10	1	15	0	2	0	112	4

=== International ===
As of match played 9 June 2026

Appearances and goals by national team and year
National team	Year	Apps	Goals
Senegal	2025	4	0
Senegal	2026	3	0
Total		7	0

== Honours ==
Nice

- Coupe de France runner-up: 2025–26

Senegal

- Africa Cup of Nations runner-up: 2025
