= Badredine Bouanani =

Footballer (born 2004)

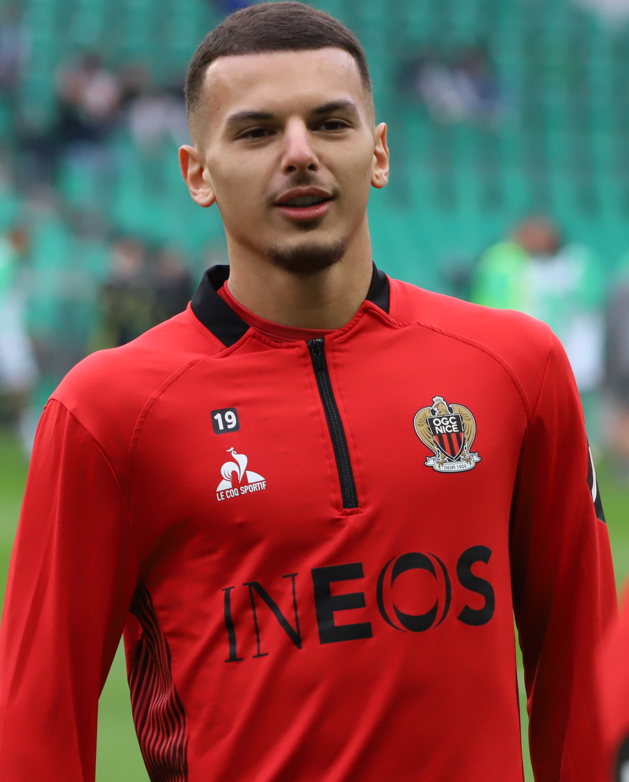
- Bouanani with Nice in 2025.

Personal information
- Date of birth: 8 December 2004 (age 21)
- Place of birth: Lille, France
- Height: 1.77 m (5 ft 10 in)
- Position: Right winger

Team information
- Current team: Rangers (on loan from VfB Stuttgart)
- Number: 26

Youth career
- 2010–2011: US Ronchin
- 2011–2021: Lille

Senior career*
Years	Team	Apps	(Gls)
2021–2022	Lille B	8	(2)
2022	Nice B	5	(4)
2023–2025	Nice	54	(3)
2024	→ Lorient (loan)	11	(1)
2025–	VfB Stuttgart	14	(0)
2026–	→ Rangers (loan)	1	(1)

International career^{‡}
2019–2020	France U16	8	(0)
2021	France U18	12	(3)
2022	France U19	3	(0)
2023–	Algeria	5	(0)
- * Club domestic league appearances and goals as of 26 April 2026 ‡ National team caps and goals as of 19:05, 14 October 2025 (UTC)

Badredine Bouanani (born 8 December 2004) is a professional footballer who plays as a right-winger for Scottish Premiership club Rangers, on loan from Bundesliga club VfB Stuttgart. Born in France, he plays for the Algeria national team.

== Club career ==
Born in Lille, France, Bouanani started his career with local side US Ronchin before joining Lille in 2011. Having progressed through the youth ranks, he was named by English newspaper The Guardian as one of the best players born in 2004 worldwide in October 2021. During his time with Lille, he was seen as the best player to come through their academy since Eden Hazard.

In April 2022, it was rumoured that Bouanani would sign for Nice when his contract with Lille expired. In July of the same year, he made the switch to Nice. On 31 January 2024, Bouanani signed for Lorient until the end of the season.

On 31 August 2025, Bouanani signed a five-year-contract with VfB Stuttgart.

On 3 September 2026, Bouanani signed for Scottish club Rangers on loan with an option to buy.

== International career ==
Bouanani has represented France at under-16, under-18 and under-19 level.

He is Algerian by descent and, after scoring for the France under-18 team in a 3–2 win over Algeria, he caused controversy by stating "Je suis Algérien" (I am Algerian), despite deciding to represent France at youth level. Since this remark, he has opted to choose the Algerian national team and was called up to the main team in March 2023

He made his full debut for Algeria on 23 March 2023, and provided the assist for Riyad Mahrez’s winning goal in a 2–1 victory over Niger.

== Career statistics ==
=== Club ===
As of match played 26 April 2026

Appearances and goals by club, season and competition
Club	Season	League			National cup (Note: Includes Coupe de France, DFB-Pokal)		Europe		Total	
Club	Season	Division	Apps	Goals	Apps	Goals	Apps	Goals	Apps	Goals
Lille B	2021–22	Championnat National 3	8	2	—		—		8	2
Nice B	2022–23	Championnat National 3	5	4	—		—		5	4
Nice	2022–23	Ligue 1	19	0	1	0	1 (Note: Appearance in UEFA Europa Conference League)	0	21	0
Nice	2023–24	Ligue 1	7	0	1	0	—		8	0
Nice	2024–25	Ligue 1	26	3	3	0	8 (Note: Appearances in UEFA Europa League)	1	37	4
Nice	2025–26	Ligue 1	3	0	0	0	2 (Note: Two appearances in UEFA Champions League)	0	5	0
Nice	Total		55	3	5	0	11	1	71	4
Lorient (loan)	2023–24	Ligue 1	11	1	—		—		11	1
VfB Stuttgart	2025–26	Bundesliga	14	0	4	0	10	2	28	2
Career total			93	10	9	0	21	3	123	13

=== International ===
As of match played 14 October 2025

Appearances and goals by national team and year
National team	Year	Apps	Goals
Algeria	2023	5	0
Total		5	0

== Honours ==
France U18

- Mediterranean Games Gold medal: 2022
