= Billal Brahimi =

Footballer (born 2000)

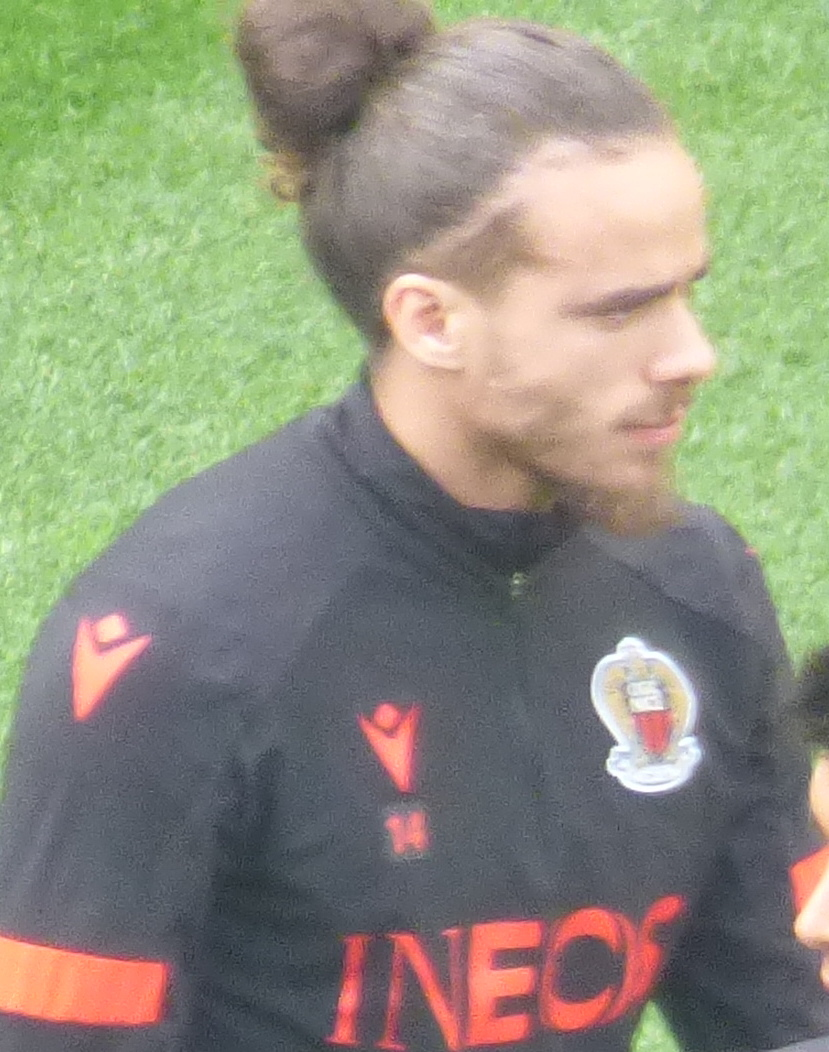
- Brahimi with Nice in 2022

Personal information
- Date of birth: 14 March 2000 (age 26)
- Place of birth: Beaumont-sur-Oise, France
- Height: 1.83 m (6 ft 0 in)
- Position: Winger

Team information
- Current team: Le Mans
- Number: 7

Youth career
- 2008–2015: Cergy Pontoise
- 2015–2016: Saint-Ouen-l'Aumône
- 2016–2017: Leixões
- 2017–2018: Middlesbrough

Senior career*
Years	Team	Apps	(Gls)
2018–2019	Middlesbrough	0	(0)
2019–2021	Reims B	20	(5)
2020–2021	→ Le Mans (loan)	34	(12)
2021	Angers B	1	(0)
2021–2022	Angers	9	(0)
2022–2025	Nice	42	(3)
2023–2024	→ Brest (loan)	18	(0)
2024–2025	→ Sint-Truiden (loan)	27	(2)
2025–2026	Santos	1	(0)
2026	→ Estrela Amadora (loan)	5	(0)
2026–	Le Mans	0	(0)

International career^{‡}
2018	France U19	2	(0)
2022–	Algeria	4	(0)
- * Club domestic league appearances and goals as of 25 May 2026 ‡ National team caps and goals as of 22:21, 10 February 2023 (UTC)

Billal Brahimi (Arabic: بلال براهيمي; born 14 March 2000) is a professional footballer who plays mainly as a winger for Ligue 1 club Le Mans. Born in France, he plays for the Algeria national team.

== Club career ==
=== Early career ===
Born in Beaumont-sur-Oise, Brahimi played for the youth categories of amateur sides Cergy Pontoise and Saint-Ouen-l'Aumône before moving to Portugal in 2016 to pursue a professional career. After one year at Leixões, he joined Middlesbrough on a ten-day trial period in the summer of 2017.

=== Middlesbrough ===
After scoring three times in four matches, Brahimi was offered a two-year scholarship deal by Boro in August 2017, and started to feature with the under-18s. He became a member of the under-23 squad ahead of the 2018–19 season, and made his first team debut for the club on 28 August 2018, in a 2–1 win over Rochdale in the EFL Cup, coming on as a substitute for Muhamed Bešić at the Riverside Stadium.

=== Reims ===
On 25 July 2019, Brahimi moved to Ligue 1 club Reims on a free transfer, with Middlesbrough receiving compensation for the departure due to having attempted to renew his contract. He cited a desire to move closer to his family in France as the motivation behind the move.

Brahimi only played for the reserve team in the Championnat National 2, aside from being an unused substitute in two matches for the first team.

==== Loan to Le Mans ====
In August 2020, he joined Le Mans in the Championnat National on loan for the 2020–21 season. He was a regular starter for the side, scoring a career-best 12 goals as they narrowly missed out a play-off spot, and was included in the division's Team of the Season.

=== Angers ===
On 8 September 2021, Brahimi moved straight to Ligue 1 after signing a three-year contract with Angers. He made his debut in the category fourteen days later, replacing Angelo Fulgini in a 0–0 home draw against Marseille.

=== Nice ===
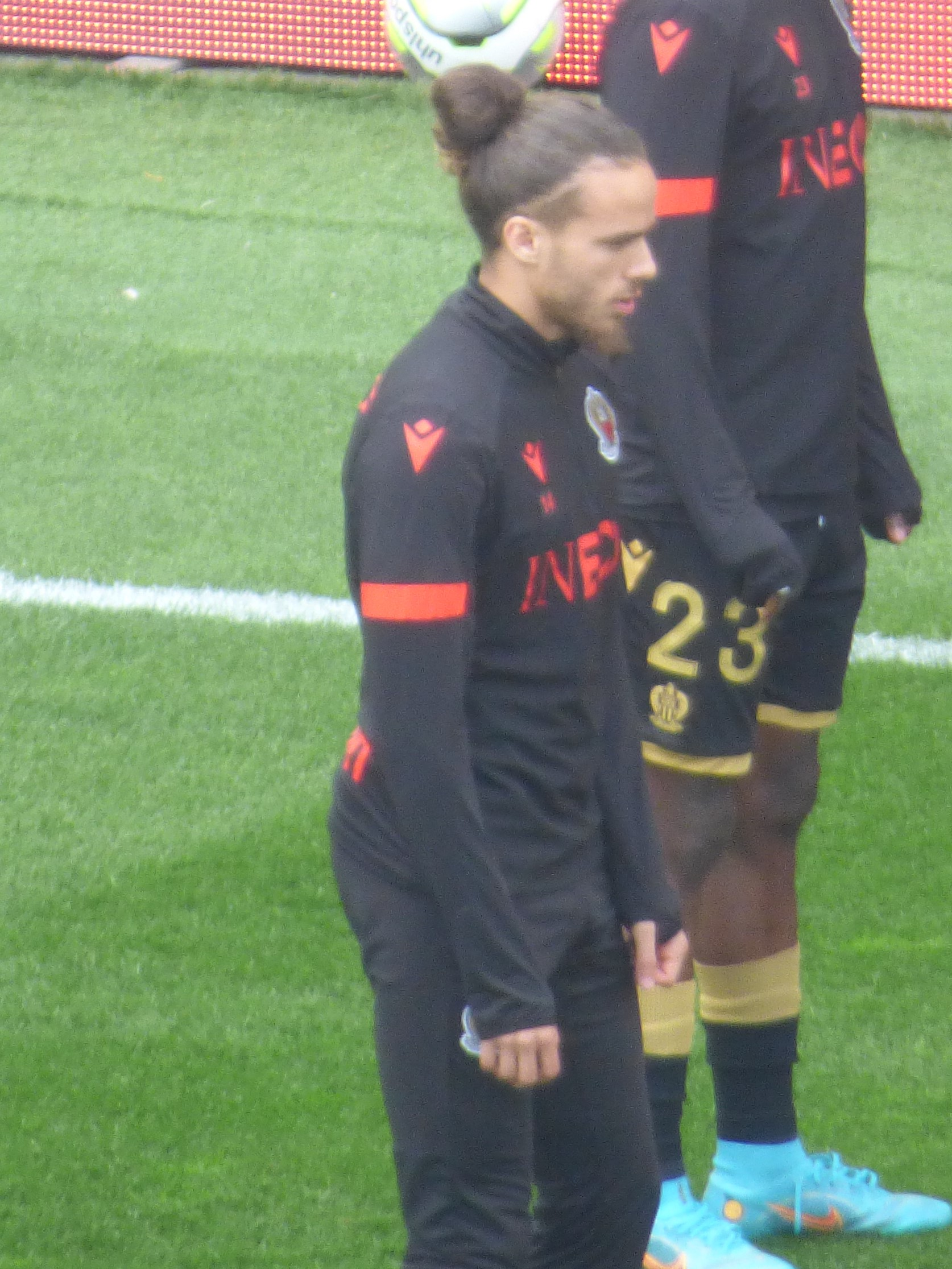
Brahimi with Nice in 2022

On 28 January 2022, Brahimi joined Nice on a four-and-a-half-year deal, for a reported fee of €10 million. He was regularly used after his arrival, and scored a brace in a 3–0 home win over Ajaccio on 10 February 2023.

==== Loan to Brest ====
On 1 September 2023, Brahimi was loaned to fellow top-tier side Brest for one year. Mainly a backup option, he featured in 20 matches overall, but was only able to amass two starts in the process.

==== Loan to Sint-Truiden ====
On 6 September 2024, Brahimi moved on loan to Sint-Truiden in Belgium, with an option to buy. He scored the winner on his STVV debut against Oud-Heverlee Leuven in new coach Felice Mazzu's first game in charge.

==== Return from loan ====
Back to Nice in July 2025, Brahimi managed to feature in the 2025–26 season opener, a 1–0 home loss to Toulouse, before terminating his contract by mutual consent on 1 September of that year.

=== Santos ===
On 24 September 2025, Brahimi was announced at Campeonato Brasileiro Série A club Santos FC on a contract until December 2026. He made his club debut on 28 September, replacing Benjamín Rollheiser in a 2–2 away draw against Red Bull Bragantino.

==== Loan to Estrela da Amadora ====
On 3 February 2026, Primeira Liga side Estrela da Amadora announced Brahimi on a loan contract until June. Again rarely used, he terminated his link with Santos on 6 July.

=== Return to Le Mans ===
On 6 July 2026, Brahimi returned to Le Mans in Ligue 1 and signed a contract for two seasons, with an option for third season.

== International career ==
Born in France, Brahimi holds French and Algerian nationalities, and played for the former nation's national under-19 team in 2018. On 27 May 2022, he was called up to the Algeria national team for two 2023 Africa Cup of Nations qualifying matches against Uganda and Tanzania.

Brahimi made his full international debut with Algeria on 4 June 2022, replacing Youcef Belaïli in a 2–0 win over Uganda at the Stade du 5 Juillet in Algiers.

== Style of play ==
Brahimi can play anywhere along the forward line, but has appeared most frequently for Middlesbrough's academy sides as a left-winger. After moving to France, he started to feature more regularly in the other flank.

== Career statistics ==
=== Club ===
As of 13 October 2025

Appearances and goals by club, season and competition
Club	Season	League			National cup (Note: Includes Coupe de France, Belgian Cup)		Continental		Other		Total	
Club	Season	Division	Apps	Goals	Apps	Goals	Apps	Goals	Apps	Goals	Apps	Goals
Middlesbrough U21	2018–19	—			—		—		1 (Note: Appearance in EFL Trophy)	0	1	0
Middlesbrough	2018–19	EFL Championship	0	0	0	0	—		1 (Note: Appearance in EFL Cup)	0	1	0
Reims B	2019–20	Championnat National 2	20	5	—		—		—		20	5
Le Mans (loan)	2020–21	Championnat National	34	12	0	0	—		—		34	12
Angers B	2021–22	Championnat National 2	1	0	—		—		—		1	0
Angers	2021–22	Ligue 1	9	0	0	0	—		—		9	0
Nice	2021–22	Ligue 1	11	0	4	0	—		—		15	0
Nice	2022–23	Ligue 1	26	3	1	0	10 (Note: Appearances in UEFA Europa Conference League)	2	—		37	5
Nice	2023–24	Ligue 1	2	0	0	0	—		—		2	0
Nice	2024–25	Ligue 1	2	0	0	0	0	0	—		2	0
Nice	2025–26	Ligue 1	1	0	—		0	0	—		1	0
Nice	Total		42	3	5	0	10	2	—		57	5
Brest (loan)	2023–24	Ligue 1	18	0	2	0	—		—		20	0
Sint-Truiden (loan)	2024–25	Belgian Pro League	27	2	1	0	—		—		28	2
Santos	2025	Série A	1	0	—		—		—		1	0
Santos	2026	Série A	0	0	0	0	0	0	0	0	0	0
Santos	Total		1	0	0	0	0	0	0	0	1	0
Career total			152	22	8	0	10	2	2	0	172	24

=== International ===
As of 14 September 2025

Appearances and goals by national team and year
National team	Year	Apps	Goals
Algeria	2022	4	0
Total		4	0

== Honours ==
Nice

- Coupe de France runner-up: 2021–22
