= Jean-Clair Todibo =

French footballer (born 1999)

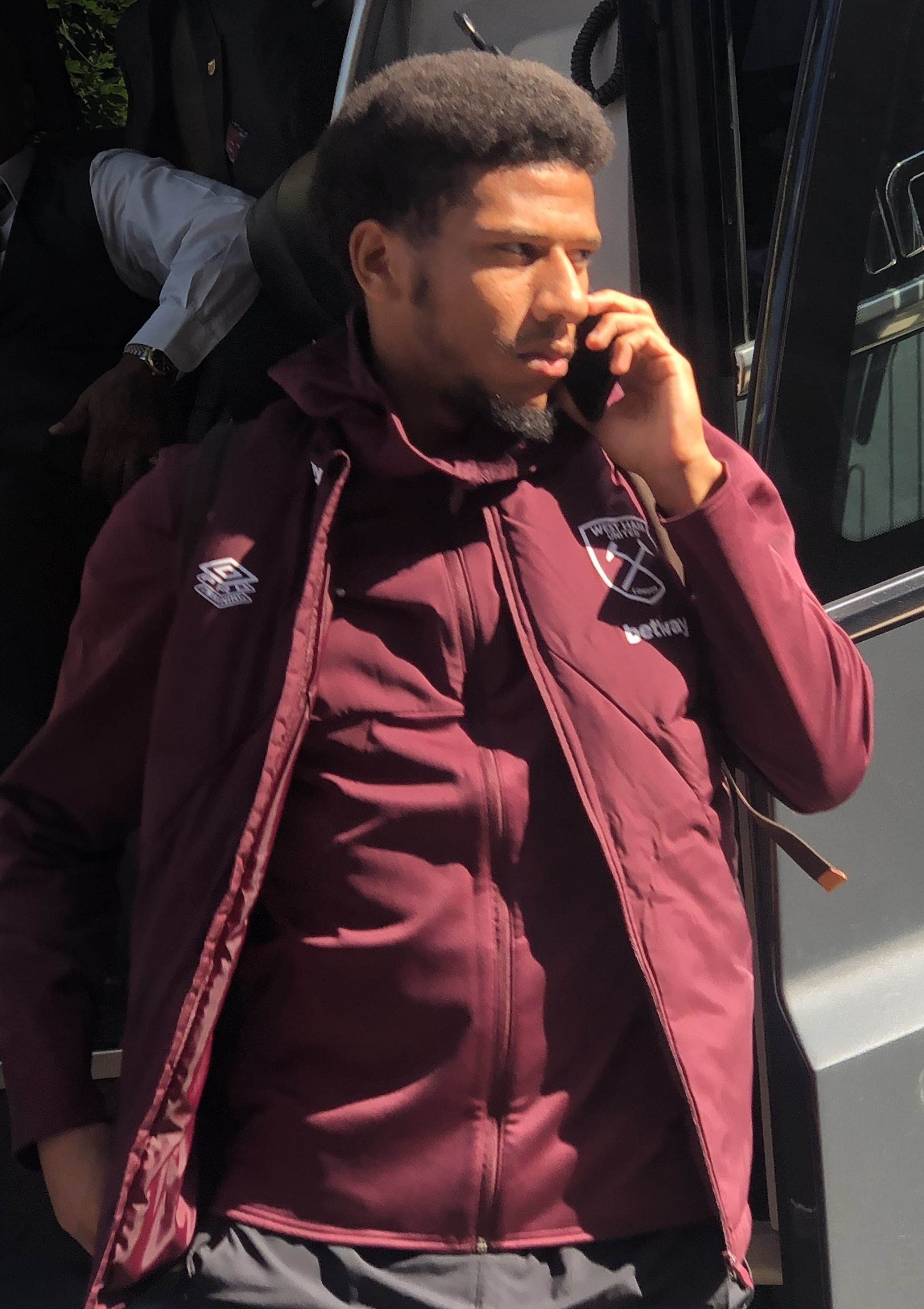
- Todibo with West Ham United in 2024

Personal information
- Full name: Jean-Clair Dimitri Roger Todibo
- Date of birth: 30 December 1999 (age 26)
- Place of birth: Cayenne, French Guiana
- Height: 1.90 m (6 ft 3 in)
- Position: Centre-back

Team information
- Current team: Lens (on loan from West Ham United)
- Number: 20

Youth career
- 2007–2016: Les Lilas
- 2016–2018: Toulouse

Senior career*
Years	Team	Apps	(Gls)
2017–2018	Toulouse B	9	(0)
2018–2019	Toulouse	10	(1)
2019–2021	Barcelona	4	(0)
2020	→ Schalke 04 (loan)	8	(0)
2020–2021	→ Benfica (loan)	0	(0)
2021	→ Nice (loan)	15	(1)
2021–2025	Nice	100	(1)
2024–2025	→ West Ham United (loan)	27	(0)
2025–	West Ham United	23	(0)
2026–	→ Lens (loan)	5	(0)

International career
2018–2019	France U20	9	(0)
2023	France	2	(0)
- * Club domestic league appearances and goals as of 23:03, 30 October 2026 (UTC)

Jean-Clair Dimitri Roger Todibo (born 30 December 1999) is a French professional footballer who plays as a centre-back for Ligue 1 club Lens, on loan from Premier League club West Ham United.

== Early and personal life ==
Todibo was born in French Guiana and grew up in the northeastern suburbs of Paris. At nine years old, he was struck by a motor vehicle, subsequently having doubts he would walk again, let alone play football. He eventually made a full recovery and continued playing with Les Lilas, the club which signed him at six years old.

== Club career ==
=== Toulouse ===
Todibo left Les Lilas for Toulouse in 2016. He made his Ligue 1 debut on 19 August 2018 against Derby de la Garonne rivals Bordeaux, playing 89 minutes in an eventual 2–1 home win. On 1 September, he was sent off in 26 minutes of a 2–1 win at Guingamp. He played ten games for the club and scored once, a late equaliser on 30 September in a 1–1 draw at Rennes.

=== Barcelona ===
On 8 January 2019, Todibo reached an agreement with Barcelona which would see him join them on a free transfer in July, when his contract with Toulouse was due to expire. However, the Spanish side pushed the transfer forward and he joined the club on 31 January. He became the 22nd French player to sign for Barcelona and was handed the number 6 shirt. He made only four appearances total for Barcelona.

==== Loan to Schalke 04 ====
On 15 January 2020, Todibo was loaned to Bundesliga club Schalke 04 until the end of the season with a buy option for €25 million, plus €5 million in add-ons. In March, Todibo was named Schalke's Player of the Month which was voted by the fans.

==== Loan to Benfica ====
On 5 October 2020, Todibo joined Primeira Liga club Benfica on a one-year loan with an option to purchase for €20 million.

=== Nice ===
On 1 February 2021, Todibo joined Ligue 1 club Nice on loan with an option to buy after his loan contract was mutually terminated by Barcelona and Benfica. On 27 June, the move was made permanent by the club as they paid €8.5m (+ €7m in variables) to Barcelona. Barcelona also reserved rights to a percentage of his future sale.

On 18 September 2022, Todibo was sent off in a match against Angers after nine seconds, the fastest red card in Ligue 1 history.

=== West Ham United ===
On 10 August 2024, Todibo joined Premier League team West Ham United on loan for the 2024–25 season. The deal included an obligation to buy at the end of the season for €40 million, to be activated if the club avoided relegation and retained their Premier League status. Following the conclusion of the season, the obligation was met, with Todibo officially joining as a permanent squad member on 1 July.

On 31 January 2026, Todibo was sent off for violent conduct during a league fixture against Chelsea at Stamford Bridge. Following a dramatic second-half comeback by Chelsea, a mass brawl erupted in the stoppage time after West Ham's Adama Traoré shoved Marc Cucurella and João Pedro. Todibo was given a straight red card after a VAR review confirmed he had grabbed Pedro by the throat, marking his first Premier League sending off, and the third in his professional career.

==== Loan to RC Lens ====
On 1 September 2026, Todibo joined Ligue 1 club Lens on a one-year loan deal.

== International career ==
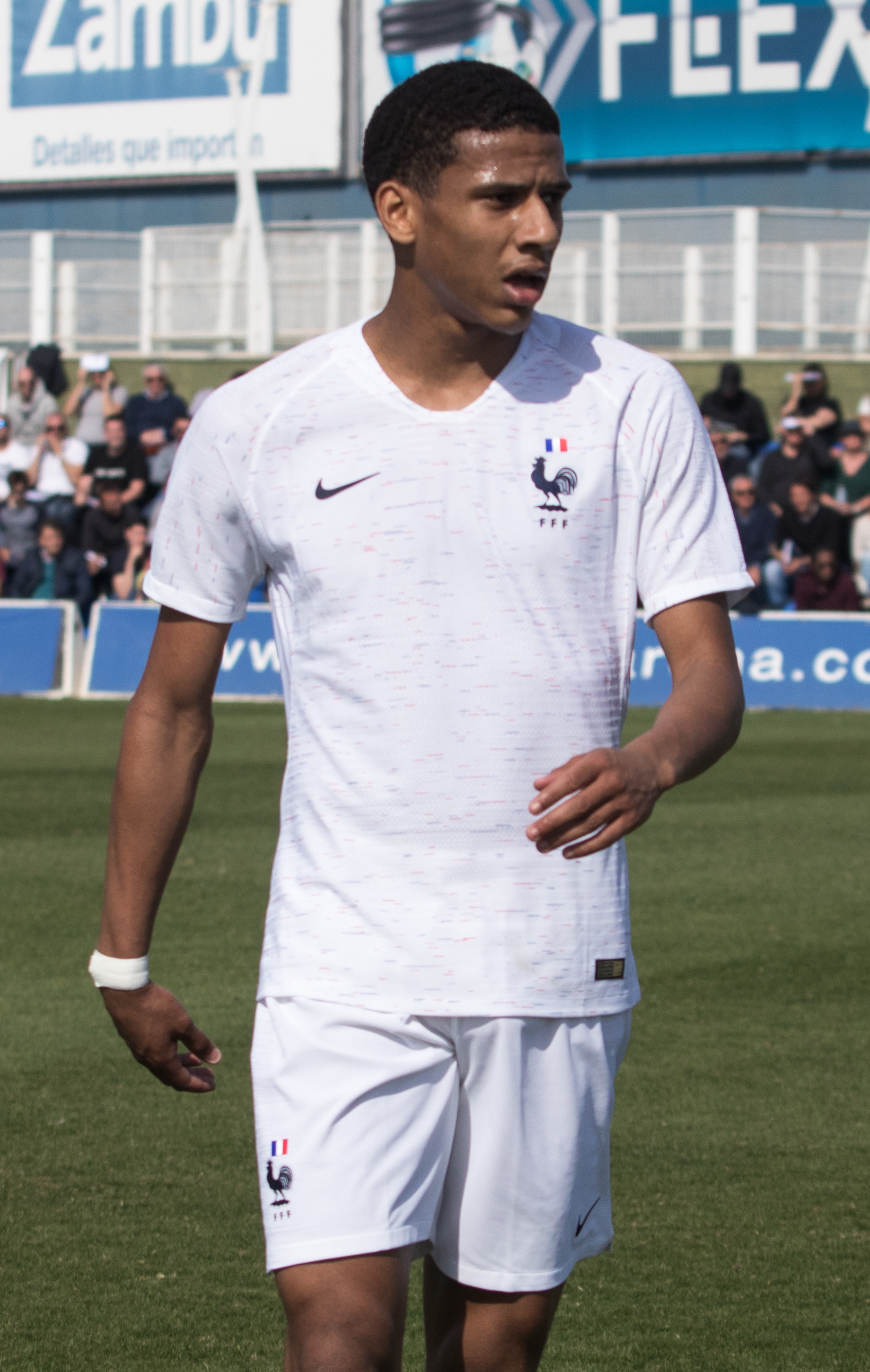
Todibo playing for France U20 in 2019

Todibo made his international debut for France under-20 on 16 November 2018, in a 1–1 friendly draw with Switzerland in Cartagena, Spain.

In March 2023, he received his first call-up to the France senior national team for the UEFA Euro 2024 qualifying matches against the Netherlands and the Republic of Ireland.

Todibo made his France debut in a 2–1 friendly loss to Germany on 12 September 2023. His competitive debut came in France's record 14–0 win over Gibraltar on 18 November.

== Career statistics ==
=== Club ===
As of match played 30 October 2026

Appearances and goals by club, season and competition
Club	Season	League			National cup (Note: Includes DFB-Pokal, Taça de Portugal, Coupe de France, FA Cup)		League cup (Note: Includes Taça da Liga, EFL Cup)		Europe		Other		Total	
Club	Season	Division	Apps	Goals	Apps	Goals	Apps	Goals	Apps	Goals	Apps	Goals	Apps	Goals
Toulouse B	2016–17	CFA 2	1	0	—		—		—		—		1	0
Toulouse B	2017–18	CFA 2	8	0	—		—		—		—		8	0
Toulouse B	Total		9	0	—		—		—		—		9	0
Toulouse	2018–19	Ligue 1	10	1	0	0	0	0	—		—		10	1
Barcelona	2018–19	La Liga	2	0	0	0	—		0	0	—		2	0
Barcelona	2019–20	La Liga	2	0	0	0	—		1 (Note: Appearances in UEFA Champions League)	0	0	0	3	0
Barcelona	Total		4	0	0	0	—		1	0	0	0	5	0
Schalke 04 (loan)	2019–20	Bundesliga	8	0	2	0	—		—		—		10	0
Benfica (loan)	2020–21	Primeira Liga	0	0	1	0	1	0	0	0	0	0	2	0
Nice (loan)	2020–21	Ligue 1	15	1	2	0	—		—		—		17	1
Nice	2021–22	Ligue 1	36	1	4	0	—		—		—		40	1
Nice	2022–23	Ligue 1	34	0	1	0	—		11 (Note: Appearances in UEFA Conference League)	0	—		46	0
Nice	2023–24	Ligue 1	30	0	3	0	—		—		—		33	0
Nice	Total		100	1	8	0	—		11	0	—		119	1
West Ham United (loan)	2024–25	Premier League	27	0	0	0	2	0	—		—		29	0
West Ham United	2025–26	Premier League	23	0	1	0	1	0	—		—		25	0
RC Lens (loan)	2026–27	Ligue 1	5	0	0	0	—		1	0	—		6	0
Career total			200	3	14	0	5	0	13	0	0	0	232	3

=== International ===
Appearances and goals by national team and year
National team	Year	Apps	Goals
France	2023	2	0
Total		2	0

== Honours ==
Barcelona

- La Liga: 2018–19

Nice

- Coupe de France runner-up: 2021–22
