= Evann Guessand =

Ivorian footballer (born 2001)

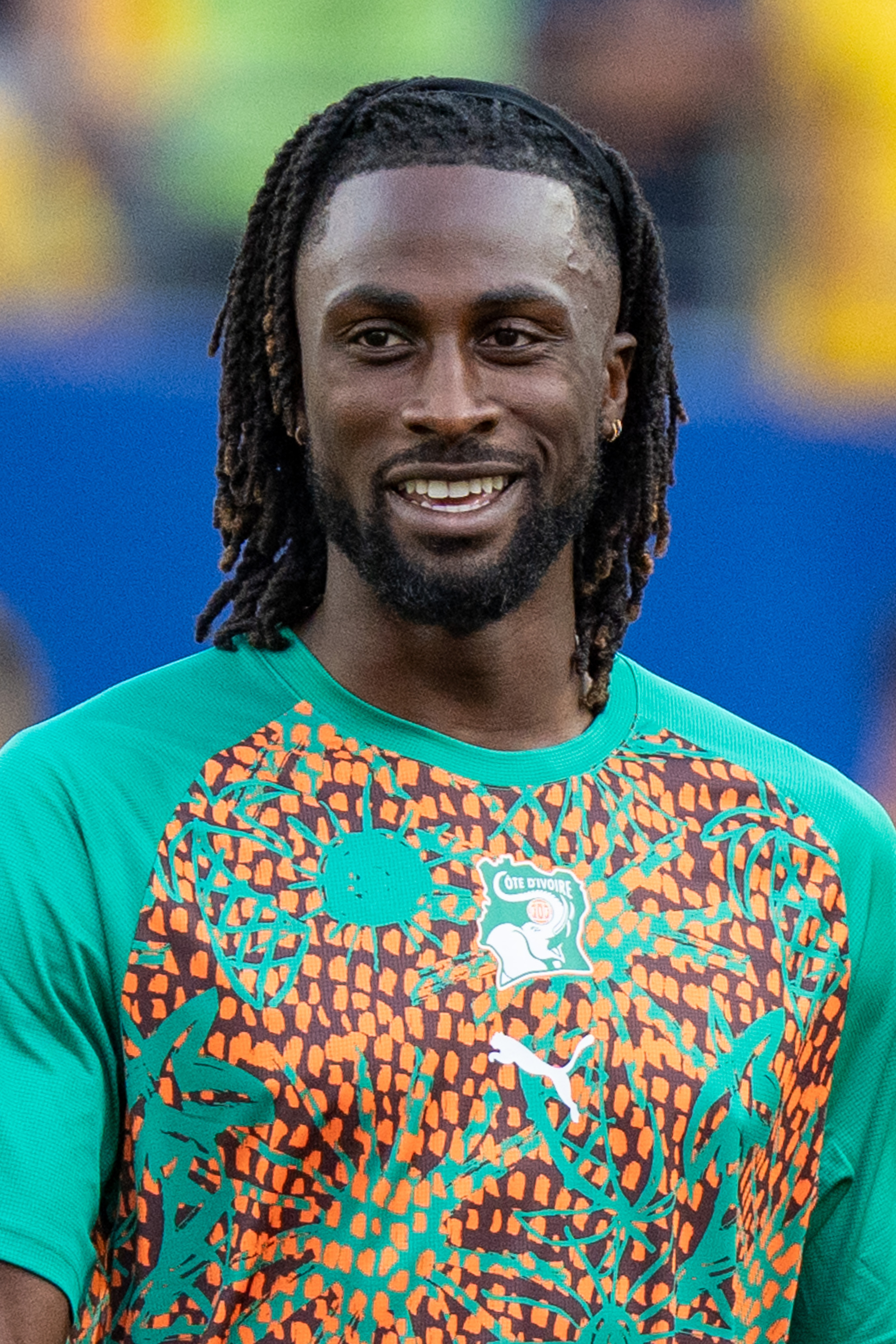
- Guessand with the Ivory Coast in 2026

Personal information
- Full name: Evann Ludovic Vidjannagni Guessand
- Date of birth: 1 July 2001 (age 25)
- Place of birth: Ajaccio, Corse-du-Sud, France
- Height: 1.85 m (6 ft 1 in)
- Positions: Winger; forward

Team information
- Current team: Crystal Palace (on loan from Aston Villa)
- Number: 29

Youth career
- 2008–2014: ASPTT Marseille
- 2014–2019: Nice

Senior career*
Years	Team	Apps	(Gls)
2018–2020	Nice B	25	(9)
2020–2025	Nice	89	(19)
2020–2021	→ Lausanne-Sport (loan)	34	(7)
2022–2023	→ Nantes (loan)	30	(3)
2025–	Aston Villa	13	(0)
2026	→ Crystal Palace (loan)	8	(1)
2026–	→ Crystal Palace (loan)	2	(0)

International career^{‡}
2017	France U16	4	(3)
2018	France U17	2	(0)
2019	France U18	5	(2)
2019	France U19	4	(0)
2024–	Ivory Coast	23	(4)
- * Club domestic league appearances and goals as of 28 August 2026 ‡ National team caps and goals as of 30 June 2026

Evann Ludovic Vidjannagni Guessand (born 1 July 2001) is a professional footballer who plays as a winger or forward for Premier League club Crystal Palace, on loan from Aston Villa. Born in France, he represents the Ivory Coast national team.

Guessand is a product of the Nice academy, and progressed through their youth and B sides to the first team, before transferring to Aston Villa in 2025. He also spent time on loan at Lausanne-Sport and Nantes earlier in his career.

Guessand was a regular French youth international up to under-19 level, before switching to the Ivory Coast in 2024.

== Early life ==
Evann Ludovic Vidjannagni Guessand was born on 1 July 2001 in Ajaccio, Corse-du-Sud. His father Servais Guessand Konan is an Ivorian former footballer who played professionally for Ajaccio.

== Club career ==
=== Nice ===
Guessand joined the youth academy of Nice at the age of 12. On 5 January 2020, he made his professional debut in a 2–0 Coupe de France win over Fréjus Saint-Raphaël. On 23 August, he made his Ligue 1 debut against Lens as a late substitute in 2–1 home win.

==== Loan to Lausanne ====
On 30 September 2020, Guessand joined Lausanne-Sport on loan. On 3 October, he made his Swiss Super League debut against Zürich, scoring his first goal for the club in the 4–0 home victory. In total, he scored seven goals during the 2020–21 season, making him the team's top goalscorer, and also recorded five assists.

==== Return to Nice ====
In the pre-season of 2021–22, Guessand extended his contract at Nice until 2026. On 24 October 2021, he recorded his first goal for the club, scoring a stoppage time winner against Lyon after coming on as an 83rd minute substitute. Three days later, he made his first start in a 1–1 draw against Marseille, assisting a goal for Amine Gouiri six minutes into the Mediterranean derby.

Overall, he made 20 league appearances during the season, including two starts. In the 2021–22 Coupe de France, Guessand made substitute appearances in every round, including the 2022 Coupe de France final where Nice were beaten 1–0 by Nantes at the Stade de France on 7 May.

==== Loan to Nantes ====
On 12 July 2022, Guessand joined Ligue 1 club Nantes on a season-long loan. He made his debut for the club in the 2022 Trophée des Champions on 31 July, where they were beaten 4–0 by Paris Saint-Germain.

He scored his first goal for the club in a 3–1 league win over Toulouse on 28 August. On 8 September, on his UEFA Europa League debut, Guessand scored the winning goal for Nantes in the final minutes of a 2–1 home victory over Olympiacos.

Guessand ended 2022–23 as a runner-up in the Coupe de France for the second consecutive season. He was an unused substitute in the 2023 Coupe de France final on 29 April, where Nantes were beaten 5–1 by Toulouse.

==== Second return to Nice ====
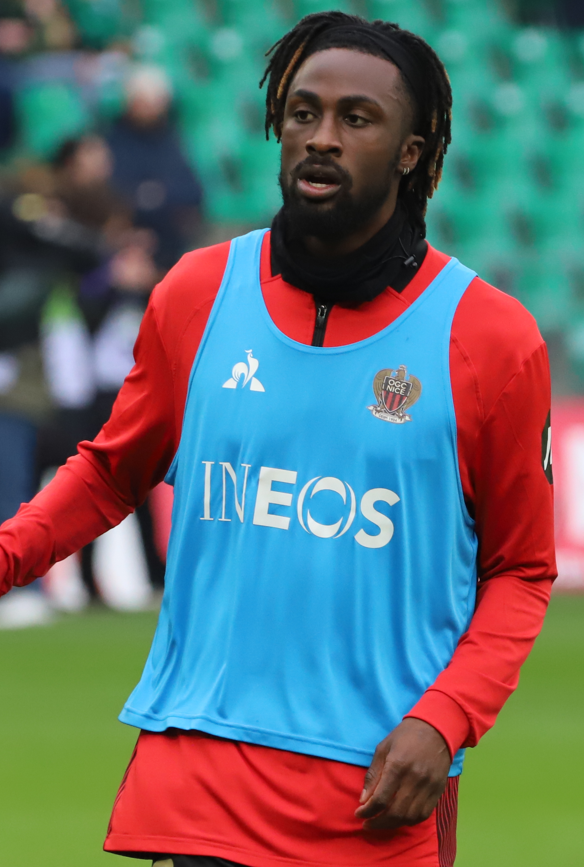
Guessand training with Nice in 2025

Guessand appeared in all 34 of Nice's matches in the 2023–24 Ligue 1 season, starting in 14 matches and scoring six goals. In 2024–25, he was named the club's Player of the Season after scoring twelve goals and recording nine assists.

=== Aston Villa ===
On 8 August 2025, Guessand signed for Premier League club Aston Villa for an undisclosed fee; the contract is valid until 2030. This fee was reported to be worth €35 million (£30.5 million). He made his Premier League debut as a late substitute in a 1–0 defeat to Brentford on 23 August. On 23 October, Guessand scored his first Aston Villa goal in an eventual 2–1 Europa League defeat to Go Ahead Eagles.

==== Loans to Crystal Palace ====
On 30 January 2026, Guessand joined fellow Premier League club Crystal Palace on a loan deal, with an option to make the move permanent at the end of the season. He made his debut on 8 February as a second-half substitute away at rivals Brighton & Hove Albion, contributing with an assist for Ismaïla Sarr in a 1–0 victory for Palace which ended a 12-match winless streak. On 22 February, he scored his first goal for Crystal Palace and first goal in the Premier League, a 90th-minute winner to seal a 1–0 victory against Wolverhampton Wanderers. Four days later, he scored Palace's second goal in the 2–0 win over Zrinjski Mostar in the UEFA Conference League.

On 27 May, he appeared as a substitute in the 2026 UEFA Conference League final as Palace won 1–0 against Rayo Vallecano. Having featured in the Europa League-winning Aston Villa squad and the Conference League-winning Crystal Palace side, he became the first ever player to win two European trophies in one season. In the summer of 2026, Crystal Palace decided not to take up the option to sign Guessand permanently. However, on 12 August, they announced they had re-signed Guessand on a further season-long loan deal, with a conditional obligation to make the move permanent at the end of the season.

== International career ==
Born in France, Guessand holds French and Ivorian nationalities. After representing France at youth level, Guessand was named in the Ivory Coast's provisional squad for the 2023 Africa Cup of Nations in December 2023.

Guessand made his debut for the Ivory Coast national team on 11 June 2024 in a World Cup qualifier against Kenya at the Bingu National Stadium in Lilongwe, Malawi. He substituted Emmanuel Latte Lath in the 61st minute of a scoreless draw. He scored his first international goal in a 1–0 win over Burundi on 21 March 2025.

Having originally only named in the back-up squad for the 2025 Africa Cup of Nations, Guessand was called up to the tournament squad to replace the injured Sébastien Haller on 19 December 2025. He appeared in four of the team's five matches at the tournament, scoring once in a 3–2 win over Gabon.

On 15 May 2026, Guessand was integrated by Ivory Coast coach Emerse Faé in his list of 26 players in order to participate in the 2026 World Cup.

== Personal life ==
Guessand is the older brother of Axel Guessand, who is also a former French youth international footballer.

== Career statistics ==
=== Club ===
As of match played 28 October 2026

Appearances and goals by club, season and competition
Club	Season	League			National cup (Note: Includes Coupe de France, Swiss Cup)		League cup (Note: Includes EFL Cup)		Europe		Other		Total	
Club	Season	Division	Apps	Goals	Apps	Goals	Apps	Goals	Apps	Goals	Apps	Goals	Apps	Goals
Nice II	2018–19	Championnat National 2	7	1	—		—		—		—		7	1
Nice II	2019–20	Championnat National 3	17	8	—		—		—		—		17	8
Nice II	2020–21	Championnat National 3	1	0	—		—		—		—		1	0
Nice II	Total		25	9	—		—		—		—		25	9
Nice	2019–20	Ligue 1	3	0	1	0	0	0	—		—		4	0
Nice	2021–22	Ligue 1	20	1	5	0	—		—		—		25	1
Nice	2023–24	Ligue 1	34	6	4	1	—		—		—		38	7
Nice	2024–25	Ligue 1	32	12	2	0	—		7 (Note: Appearances in UEFA Europa League)	1	—		41	13
Nice	Total		89	19	12	1	—		7	1	—		108	21
Lausanne-Sport (loan)	2020–21	Swiss Super League	34	7	1	0	—		—		—		35	7
Nantes (loan)	2022–23	Ligue 1	30	3	5	1	—		9	2	1 (Note: Appearance in Trophée des Champions)	0	45	6
Aston Villa	2025–26	Premier League	13	0	0	0	1	0	7	2	—		21	2
Crystal Palace (loan)	2025–26	Premier League	8	1	—		—		6 (Note: Appearances in UEFA Conference League)	1	—		14	2
Crystal Palace (loan)	2026–27	Premier League	2	0	0	0	1	0	0	0	—		3	0
Crystal Palace (loan)	Total		10	1	0	0	1	0	6	1	—		17	2
Career total			201	39	18	2	2	0	29	6	1	0	251	47

=== International ===
As of match played 30 June 2026

Appearances and goals by national team and year
National team	Year	Apps	Goals
Ivory Coast	2024	6	0
Ivory Coast	2025	11	3
Ivory Coast	2026	6	1
Total		23	4

Ivory Coast score listed first, score column indicates score after each Guessand goal.

List of international goals scored by Evann Guessand
No.	Date	Venue	Opponent	Score	Result	Competition
1	21 March 2025	Meknes Honor Stadium, Meknes, Morocco	Burundi	1–0	1–0	2026 FIFA World Cup qualification
2	10 October 2025	Côte d'Or National Sports Complex, Saint Pierre, Mauritius	Seychelles	4–0	7–0	2026 FIFA World Cup qualification
3	31 December 2025	Marrakesh Stadium, Marrakesh, Morocco	Gabon	2–2	3–2	2025 Africa Cup of Nations
4	28 March 2026	Stadium MK, Milton Keynes, England	South Korea	1–0	4–0	Friendly

== Honours ==
Nice

- Coupe de France runner-up: 2021–22

Aston Villa

- UEFA Europa League: 2025–26

Crystal Palace

- UEFA Conference League: 2025–26

Individual

- Nice Player of the Season: 2024–25
