= Victor Orakpo =

Nigerian footballer (born 2006)

Personal information
- Full name: Victor Ikechukwu Jonathan Orakpo
- Date of birth: 14 January 2006 (age 20)
- Place of birth: Nigeria
- Height: 1.95 m (6 ft 5 in)
- Position: Forward

Team information
- Current team: Gençlerbirliği (on loan from Nice)
- Number: 12

Youth career
- FC Bako
- 2022–2024: VOE Football Academy

Senior career*
Years	Team	Apps	(Gls)
2024–	Nice	4	(0)
2025–2026	→ Montpellier (loan)	13	(0)
2025–2026	→ Montpellier II (loan)	2	(0)
2026	→ Nancy (loan)	8	(0)
2026–	→ Gençlerbirliği (loan)	1	(0)

International career^{‡}
2022	Nigeria U20	4	(6)
- * Club domestic league appearances and goals as of 6 September 2026 ‡ National team caps and goals as of 13:54, 26 August 2024 (UTC)

Victor Ikechukwu Jonathan Orakpo (born 14 January 2006) is a Nigerian professional footballer who plays as a forward for Süper Lig club Gençlerbirliği in Turkey on loan from French club Nice.

== Club career ==
Orakpo is a product of FC Bako, before moving to the VOE Football Academy who was part of the Bayern Munich academy international network. On 31 January 2024, he transferred to Ligue 1 club Nice until 2027. He made his senior debut with Nice as a substitute in a 2–1 Ligue 1 loss to Auxerre on 18 August 2024. On 26 August 2024, he extended his contract with Nice until 2028.

On 2 February 2026, Orakpo joined Nancy in Ligue 2 on loan. On 3 September 2026, he was loaned by Gençlerbirliği in Turkey for the 2026–27 season.

== International career ==
Orakpo was the MVP for the Nigeria U20s at the 2022 FC Bayern Youth Cup, with six goals.

== Career statistics ==
As of match played 10 November 2024

Appearances and goals by club, season and competition
Club	Season	League			Cup		Continental		Other		Total	
Club	Season	Division	Apps	Goals	Apps	Goals	Apps	Goals	Apps	Goals	Apps	Goals
Nice	2024–25	Ligue 1	4	0	0	0	1 (Note: Appearances in UEFA Europa League)	0	0	0	5	0
Career total			4	0	0	0	1	0	0	0	5	0
