= Amidou Doumbouya =

French footballer (born 2007)

Personal information
- Date of birth: 5 August 2007 (age 19)
- Place of birth: Bourges, France
- Height: 1.82 m (6 ft 0 in)
- Position: Centre-back

Team information
- Current team: Al Ahli (on loan from Al-Duhail)
- Number: 24

Youth career
- 2014–2019: ES Moulon Bourges
- 2019–2022: Bourges Foot
- 2022–2023: Sochaux

Senior career*
| Years | Team | Apps | (Gls) |
| 2022–2023 | Sochaux II | 1 | (0) |
| 2023–2025 | Nice | 2 | (0) |
| 2025– | Al-Duhail | 0 | (0) |
| 2025– | → Al Ahli (loan) | 0 | (0) |

International career^{‡}
| 2022–2023 | France U16 | 12 | (0) |
| 2023 | France U17 | 2 | (0) |
| 2024–2025 | France U18 | 12 | (1) |
- * Club domestic league appearances and goals as of 7 December 2024 ‡ National team caps and goals as of 10 June 2025

Amidou Doumbouya (born 5 August 2007) is a French footballer who plays as a centre-back for Qatari club Al Ahli on loan from Al-Duhail.

== Early life ==
Born in Bourges, Centre-Val de Loire, Doumbouya started his youth career playing for local clubs ES Moulon Bourges and then Bourges Foot. In 2022, he was recruited to the Sochaux. After one season at the club, he was transferred Nice for reported fee of €500,000 and signed his professional contract here.

== Club career ==
On 7 February 2024, he made his debut for Nice in a 4–1 victory against Montpellier as part of the Coupe de France round of 16.

On 4 September 2025, Doumbouya was transferred to Al-Duhail in Qatar. On the same day, he was loaned by Al-Duhail to another Qatar Stars League club Al Ahli.

== International career ==
While also eligible to play for Guinea, Doumbouya chose to represent France at youth level, selected with France U16 and France U17.

== Career statistics ==
As of match played 21 December 2024

Appearances and goals by club, season and competition
| Club | Season | League | | | Cup | | Europe | | Other | | Total | |
| Club | Season | Division | Apps | Goals | Apps | Goals | Apps | Goals | Apps | Goals | Apps | Goals |
|---|---|---|---|---|---|---|---|---|---|---|---|---|
| Sochaux II | 2023–24 | National 3 | 1 | 0 | — | | — | | — | | 1 | 0 |
| Nice | 2024–25 | Ligue 1 | 2 | 0 | 1 | 0 | 0 | 0 | — | | 3 | 0 |
| Career total | | | 3 | 0 | 1 | 0 | 0 | 0 | 0 | 0 | 4 | 0 |
