= Ayoub Amraoui =

Moroccan footballer (born 2004)

Personal information
- Date of birth: 14 May 2004 (age 22)
- Place of birth: La Seyne-sur-Mer, France
- Height: 1.86 m (6 ft 1 in)
- Position: Left-back

Team information
- Current team: Al Ahli
- Number: 88

Youth career
- US Ollioules
- Racing Toulon
- SC Air Bel
- 2019–2021: Nice

Senior career*
Years	Team	Apps	(Gls)
2021–	Nice II	41	(2)
2023–2025	Nice	7	(0)
2024	→ Nancy (loan)	0	(0)
2024	→ Amiens (loan)	9	(0)
2024–2025	→ Martigues (loan)	30	(2)
2025–	Al Ahli	9	(0)

International career^{‡}
2022–	Morocco U20	1	(0)
Medal record
Representing Morocco
U-23 Africa Cup of Nations
Winner	2023 Morocco
- * Club domestic league appearances and goals as of 17 January 2026 ‡ National team caps and goals as of 22:09, 3 March 2023 (UTC)

Ayoub Amraoui (Arabic: ايوب عمراوي; born 14 May 2004) is a professional footballer who plays as a left-back for Qatar Stars League club Al Ahli. Born in France, he represents Morocco at youth level.

== Club career ==
Amraoui is a youth product of Ollioules, Racing Toulon and SC Air Bel and joined Nice's youth side in 2019. On 20 June 2021, he signed a professional contract until 2024. He made his professional debut with Nice as a starter in a 3–0 Ligue 1 win over Monaco on 26 February 2023.

In January 2024, he joined Championnat National club Nancy on loan for the remainder of the season. Just one week later, he was recalled and sent on loan to Amiens in Ligue 2 instead.

=== Al-Ahli ===
On 17 July 2025, Amraoui was transferred to Al Ahli in Qatar.

== International career ==
Born in France, Amraoui holds French and Moroccan nationalities. He was called up to the Morocco U20s for a set of friendlies in March 2022. He made one appearance for the U20s against the Romania U20s in a 2–2 friendly tie on 29 March 2022.

In June 2023, he was included in the final squad of the under-23 national team for the 2023 U-23 Africa Cup of Nations, hosted by Morocco itself, where the Atlas Lions won their first title and qualified for the 2024 Summer Olympics.

== Career statistics ==
=== Club ===
As of match played 17 May 2024

Appearances and goals by club, season and competition
Club	Season	League			National cup		Europe		Other		Total	
Club	Season	Division	Apps	Goals	Apps	Goals	Apps	Goals	Apps	Goals	Apps	Goals
Nice II	2021–22	Championnat National 3	25	2	—		—		—		25	2
Nice II	2022–23	Championnat National 3	16	0	—		—		—		16	0
Nice II	Total		41	2	—		—		—		41	2
Nice	2022–23	Ligue 1	7	0	0	0	4 (Note: Appearances in UEFA Europa Conference League)	1	—		11	1
Nice	2023–24	Ligue 1	0	0	1	0	—		—		1	0
Nice	Total		7	0	1	0	4	1	—		12	1
Amiens (loan)	2023–24	Ligue 2	9	0	—		—		—		9	0
Career total			57	2	1	0	4	1	0	0	62	3

== Honours ==
Morocco U23

- U-23 Africa Cup of Nations: 2023
