= Jordan Machado =

Association football player (born 1995)

Personal information
- Full name: Jordan Jean Luc Agostinho Machado
- Date of birth: 28 January 1995 (age 31)
- Place of birth: Montpellier, France
- Height: 1.83 m (6 ft 0 in)
- Position: Defender

Team information
- Current team: Corte

Senior career*
Years	Team	Apps	(Gls)
2013–2016	Montpellier B	27	(3)
2017–2018	FIU Panthers		
2018–2019	Besançon Football	21	(0)
2019–2021	Seraing	15	(1)
2021–2022	Bastia-Borgo	6	(0)
2022–2023	L'Union-Saint-Jean FC	17	(1)
2023–	Corte	28	(0)

International career
2014	Portugal U19	9	(0)
- * Club domestic league appearances and goals as of 7 December 2024

Jordan Jean Luc Agostinho Machado (born 28 January 1995) is a professional footballer who plays as a defender for Championnat National 3 club Corte. Born in France, he is a former Portugal youth international.

== Club career ==
Machado started his career with Ligue 1 side Montpellier, but left due to the departure of head coach Rolland Courbis. After that, he trained with Levante in the before playing college soccer for Florida International University.

On 5 August 2021, Machado signed with Bastia-Borgo in the Championnat National.
