= Jérémy Stinat =

French footballer (born 1978)

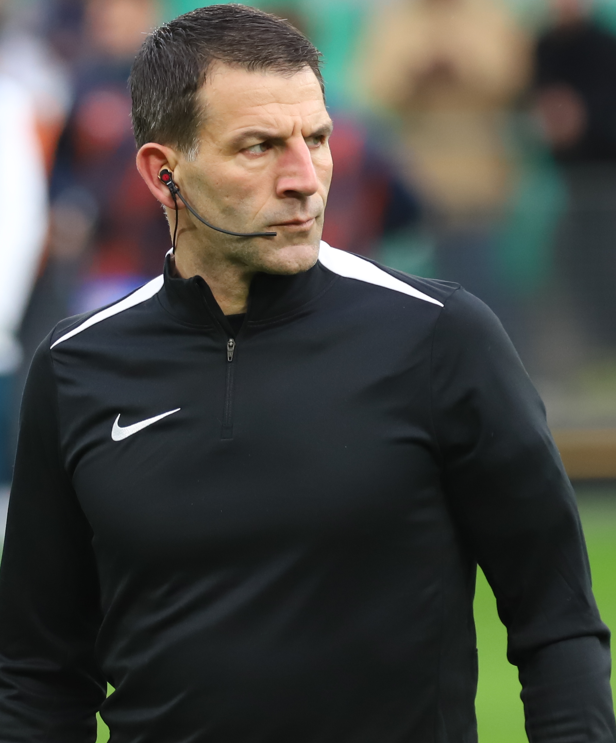
- Stinat in 2025

Personal information
- Date of birth: 15 December 1978 (age 47)
- Place of birth: Chartres, France
- Height: 1.73 m (5 ft 8 in)
- Position: Defender

Senior career*
Years	Team	Apps	(Gls)
1995–2001	Bordeaux B		
1999–2000	→ Thouars (loan)		
2001–2002	ASOA Valence B		
2002–2004	ASOA Valence	57	(2)
2004–2007	Grenoble	98	(0)
2007–2009	Sedan	44	(0)
2009–2011	Laval	43	(0)
- * Club domestic league appearances and goals as of 13:44, 12 November 2009 (UTC)

Jérémy Stinat (born 15 December 1978) is a French professional football referee and former player who played for several years in Ligue 2. He has been a Ligue 1 referee since 2018.
