= 2021–22 OGC Nice season =

OGC Nice
2021–22 season
- Owner: Jim Ratcliffe
- President: Jean-Pierre Rivère
- Head coach: Christophe Galtier
- Stadium: Allianz Riviera
- Ligue 1: 5th
- Coupe de France: Runners-up
- Top goalscorer: League: Andy Delort (16); All: Andy Delort (18)
- Highest home attendance: 24,519 vs Lyon
- Lowest home attendance: 0 vs Bordeaux & Monaco
- Biggest win: Lille 0–4 Nice; Nice 4–0 Bordeaux
Home colours	Away colours	Third colours

The 2021–22 season was the 95th season in the existence of OGC Nice and the club's 20th consecutive season in the top flight of French football. In addition to the domestic league, Nice participated in this season's edition of the Coupe de France.

== Season overview ==
On 28 June 2021, reigning Ligue 1 manager of the year Christophe Galtier was appointed as the new head coach of Nice.

== Players ==
=== First-team squad ===
Note: Flags indicate national team as defined under FIFA eligibility rules; some limited exceptions apply. Players may hold more than one non-FIFA nationality.

No.	Pos.	Nation	Player
1	GK	POL	Marcin Bułka (on loan from Paris Saint-Germain)
4	DF	BRA	Dante (captain)
5	DF	AUT	Flavius Daniliuc
6	MF	FRA	Morgan Schneiderlin
7	FW	ALG	Andy Delort
8	MF	NED	Pablo Rosario
9	FW	DEN	Kasper Dolberg
10	FW	FRA	Alexis Claude-Maurice
11	FW	FRA	Amine Gouiri
12	DF	FRA	Jordan Amavi (on loan from Marseille)
14	MF	ALG	Billal Brahimi
15	MF	BRA	Danilo Barbosa
16	GK	ALG	Teddy Boulhendi

No.	Pos.	Nation	Player
18	MF	GAB	Mario Lemina
19	MF	FRA	Khéphren Thuram
20	DF	ALG	Youcef Atal
21	FW	NED	Justin Kluivert (on loan from Roma)
22	FW	NED	Calvin Stengs
23	DF	SUI	Jordan Lotomba
24	FW	FRA	Evann Guessand
25	DF	FRA	Jean-Clair Todibo
26	DF	FRA	Melvin Bard
28	MF	ALG	Hicham Boudaoui
33	MF	CAN	Justin Smith
40	GK	ARG	Walter Benítez

=== Out on loan ===
Note: Flags indicate national team as defined under FIFA eligibility rules; some limited exceptions apply. Players may hold more than one non-FIFA nationality.

No.	Pos.	Nation	Player
3	DF	BRA	Robson Bambu (on loan to Corinthians)
29	FW	FRA	Lucas Da Cunha (on loan to Clermont Foot)
34	FW	IRL	Deji Sotona (on loan to Brentford B)
—	DF	CIV	Ibrahim Cissé (on loan to Le Mans FC)

No.	Pos.	Nation	Player
—	MF	FRA	Alexis Trouillet (on loan to AJ Auxerre)
—	MF	CIV	Jean N'Guessan (on loan to Lausanne-Sport)
—	DF	FRA	Andy Pelmard (on loan to FC Basel)
—	FW	SUI	Dan Ndoye (on loan to FC Basel)

=== Other players under contract ===
Note: Flags indicate national team as defined under FIFA eligibility rules; some limited exceptions apply. Players may hold more than one non-FIFA nationality.

No.	Pos.	Nation	Player
—	FW	FRA	Ihsan Sacko

== Transfers ==
=== In ===
No.	Pos	Player	Transferred from	Fee	Type	Date	Source
	DF	(Ivory Coast) Ibrahim Cissé	(France) Châteauroux	Free	Loan return	30 June 2021	
	DF	(Ivory Coast) Armel Zohouri	(Switzerland) Lausanne-Sport	Free	Loan return	30 June 2021	
12	DF	(Senegal) Racine Coly	(France) Amiens	Free	Loan return	30 June 2021	
	MF	(Portugal) Pedro Brazão	(Switzerland) Lausanne-Sport	Free	Loan return	30 June 2021	
	MF	(France) Wylan Cyprien	(Italy) Parma	Free	Loan return	30 June 2021	
	MF	(Ivory Coast) Trazié Thomas	(Switzerland) Lausanne-Sport	Free	Loan return	30 June 2021	
	MF	(France) Hicham Mahou	(Switzerland) Lausanne-Sport	Free	Loan return	30 June 2021	
	FW	(France) Ihsan Sacko	(Italy) Cosenza	Free	Loan return	30 June 2021	
24	FW	(France) Evann Guessand	(Switzerland) Lausanne-Sport	Free	Loan return	30 June 2021	
29	FW	(France) Lucas Da Cunha	(Switzerland) Lausanne-Sport	Free	Loan return	30 June 2021	
	MF	(Ivory Coast) Jean N'Guessan	(Ivory Coast) Abidjan	Undisclosed	Transfer	1 July 2021	
25	DF	(France) Jean-Clair Todibo	(Spain) Barcelona	€8.5m (+ add-ons)	Transfer	1 July 2021	
22	FW	(Netherlands) Calvin Stengs	(Netherlands) AZ	€15.0m	Transfer	14 July 2021	
21	FW	(Netherlands) Justin Kluivert	(Italy) Roma	Undisclosed	Loan with buy option	20 July 2021	
18	MF	(Gabon) Mario Lemina	(England) Southampton	€5.50m	Transfer	24 July 2021	
8	MF	(Netherlands) Pablo Rosario	(Netherlands) PSV	€6.0m	Transfer	27 July 2021	
26	DF	(France) Melvin Bard	(France) Lyon	€3.0m	Transfer	31 July 2021	
1	GK	(Poland) Marcin Bułka	(France) Paris Saint-Germain	Undisclosed	Loan with buy option	5 August 2021	
7	FW	(Algeria) Andy Delort	(France) Montpellier	€10.0m	Transfer	28 August 2021	
15	MF	(Brazil) Danilo Barbosa	(Brazil) Palmeiras	Free	Loan return	31 December 2021	
12	DF	(France) Jordan Amavi	(France) Marseille	Undisclosed	Loan	5 January 2022	
	DF	(Ivory Coast) Kouadio Ange Ahoussou	(Ivory Coast) Abidjan	Undisclosed	Transfer	7 January 2022	
14	MF	(Algeria) Billal Brahimi	(France) Angers	€7M	Transfer	28 January 2022	

=== Out ===
No.	Pos	Player	Transferred to	Fee	Type	Date	Source
25	DF	(France) Jean-Clair Todibo	(Spain) Barcelona	Free	Loan return	30 June 2021	
18	DF	(France) William Saliba	(England) Arsenal	Free	Loan return	30 June 2021	
29	MF	(France) Jeff Reine-Adélaïde	(France) Lyon	Free	Loan return	30 June 2021	
22	MF	(Portugal) Rony Lopes	(Spain) Sevilla	Free	Loan return	30 June 2021	
30	GK	(France) Yoan Cardinale	Free agent	Free	End of contract	1 July 2021	
	DF	(Ivory Coast) Armel Zohouri	(Switzerland) Lausanne-Sport	Undisclosed	Transfer	1 July 2021	
	DF	(Ivory Coast) Ibrahim Cissé	(France) Le Mans	Undisclosed	Loan	1 July 2021	
	MF	(Ivory Coast) Trazié Thomas	(Switzerland) Lausanne-Sport	Undisclosed	Transfer	1 July 2021	
	MF	(France) Hicham Mahou	(Switzerland) Lausanne-Sport	Undisclosed	Transfer	1 July 2021	
	MF	(France) Wylan Cyprien	(Italy) Parma	€6.70m	Transfer	1 July 2021	
	MF	(Ivory Coast) Jean N'Guessan	(Switzerland) Lausanne-Sport	Undisclosed	Loan	2 July 2021	
12	DF	(Senegal) Racine Coly	(Portugal) Estoril	Free	Transfer	3 July 2021	
8	MF	(France) Pierre Lees-Melou	(England) Norwich City	€6.0m	Transfer	13 July 2021	
24	DF	(France) Andy Pelmard	(Switzerland) Basel	Undisclosed	Loan with buy option	20 July 2021	
2	DF	(France) Stanley Nsoki	(Belgium) Club Brugge	€6.50m	Transfer	24 July 2021	
	MF	(Portugal) Pedro Brazão	(Portugal) Famalicão	Undisclosed	Transfer	18 August 2021	
33	MF	(France) Malik Sellouki	(Slovenia) Maribor	Free	Transfer	25 August 2021	
27	MF	(France) Alexis Trouillet	(France) Auxerre	Undisclosed	Loan	30 August 2021	
14	FW	(Switzerland) Dan Ndoye	(Switzerland) Basel	Undisclosed	Loan with buy option	31 August 2021	
7	FW	(France) Myziane Maolida	(Germany) Hertha BSC	€4.0m	Transfer	31 August 2021	
13	DF	(Ivory Coast) Hassane Kamara	(England) Watford	€4.0m	Transfer	4 January 2022	
29	FW	(France) Lucas Da Cunha	(France) Clermont Foot	Undisclosed	Loan	17 January 2022	
3	DF	(Brazil) Robson Bambu	(Brazil) Corinthians	Undisclosed	Loan	20 January 2022	
34	FW	(Republic of Ireland) Deji Sotona	(England) Brentford B	Undisclosed	Loan	31 January 2022	

== Pre-season and friendlies ==
Win Draw Loss

3 July 2021 Friendly	Nice	1–1	Rodez	Nice, France
18:00 CEST (UTC+2)	Da Cunha 43'	Report	Bonnet 54'	Stadium: Nice Training Center; Attendance: 0

10 July 2021 Friendly	Nice	0–3	Lausanne-Sport	Nice, France
10:00 CEST (UTC+2)		Report	Amdouni 53'; Thomas 56', 76'	Stadium: Nice Training Center; Attendance: 0

16 July 2021 Friendly	Bastia	1–0	Nice	Divonne-les-Bains, France
18:00 CEST (UTC+2)	Robic 77' (pen.)	Report		Stadium: Complexe sportif de Divonne-les-Bains; Attendance: 0 Referee: Karim Abed

17 July 2021 Friendly	Nice	2–1	Dynamo Kyiv	Meyrin, Switzerland
20:00 CEST (UTC+2)	Atal (yellow card) 39'; Pelmard (yellow card) 52'; Ndoye 70'; Trouillet 80', (yellow card) 86'	Report	Shkurin (yellow card) 37', (goal) 38'	Stadium: Stade des Arbères; Attendance: 500

21 July 2021 Friendly	Saint-Étienne	Cancelled	Nice	Aix-les-Bains, France
18:00 CEST (UTC+2)				Stadium: Stade Municipal Jacques Forestier
Note: The match was called off at the request of Nice due to time constraints.

24 July 2021 Friendly	Nice	0–2	Union Berlin	Imst, Austria
16:00 CEST (UTC+2)		Report	Khedira 15'; Knoche 53'	Stadium: Velly Arena Imst

31 July 2021 Friendly	Nice	1–1	Milan	Nice, France
21:00 CEST (UTC+2)	Kluivert (yellow card) 29'; Gouiri 59' (pen.)	Report	Tonali (yellow card) 21'; Hernandez (yellow card) 31'; Giroud 66'	Stadium: Allianz Riviera; Referee: Florent Batta

== Competitions ==
=== Overall record ===
Competition	First match	Last match	Starting round	Final position	Record							
Competition	First match	Last match	Starting round	Final position	Pld	W	D	L	GF	GA	GD	Win %
Ligue 1	8 August 2021	21 May 2022	Matchday 1	5th	38	20	7	11	52	36	+16	52.63
Coupe de France	19 December 2021	7 May 2022	Round of 64	Runners-up	5	3	1	1	7	2	+5	60.00
Total					43	23	8	12	59	38	+21	53.49

Source: Soccerway

=== Ligue 1 ===
==== League table ====
Pos	Team	Pld	W	D	L	GF	GA	GD	Pts	Qualification or relegation
3	Monaco	38	20	9	9	65	40	+25	69	Qualification for the Champions League third qualifying round
4	Rennes	38	20	6	12	82	40	+42	66	Qualification for the Europa League group stage
5	Nice	38	20	7	11	52	36	+16	66 (Note: Nice were deducted one point for uncontrolled crowd trouble that caused the abandonment of their match against Marseille.)	Qualification for the Europa Conference League play-off round
6	Strasbourg	38	17	12	9	60	43	+17	63	
7	Lens	38	17	11	10	62	48	+14	62	

Source: Ligue 1
Rules for classification: 1) Points; 2) Goal difference; 3) Head-to-head points; 4) Head-to-head goal difference; 5) Head-to-head goals scored; 6) Head-to-head away goals scored; 7) Goals scored; 8) Away goals scored; 9) Fair-play points (Note: Head-to-head record is used only after all the matches between the teams in question have been played).

==== Results summary ====
Overall								Home						Away					
Pld	W	D	L	GF	GA	GD	Pts	W	D	L	GF	GA	GD	W	D	L	GF	GA	GD
38	20	7	11	52	36	+16	67	10	4	5	27	21	+6	10	3	6	25	15	+10

Source: Ligue 1

==== Results by round ====
Round	1	2	3	4	5	6	7	8	9	10	11	12	13	14	15	16	17	18	19	20	21	22	23	24	25	26	27	28	29	30	31	32	33	34	35	36	37	38
Ground	H	A	H	H	A	H	A	A	H	A	H	A	H	A	H	A	H	A	H	A	H	A	H	A	H	A	H	A	A	H	A	H	A	H	A	H	H	A
Result	D	W	D	W	W	D	L	W	W	L	W	W	L	W	L	D	L	W	W	W	W	W	L	L	W	D	W	D	L	D	L	W	L	W	W	W	L	W
Position	15	4	2	4	4	5	7	4	3	4	3	2	3	2	3	4	4	4	2	2	2	2	3	3	3	3	2	3	4	5	5	4	6	5	5	4	6	5

Source: Ligue 1
A = Away; H = Home; W = Win; D = Draw; L = Loss

==== Matches ====
The league fixtures were announced on 25 June 2021.

8 August 2021 1	Nice	0–0	Reims	Nice
15:00 CEST (UTC+2)	Todibo (yellow card) 45+1'	Report	Cafaro (yellow card) 52'	Stadium: Allianz Riviera; Attendance: 18,030; Referee: Johan Hamel

14 August 2021 2	Lille	0–4	Nice	Villeneuve-d'Ascq
17:00 CEST (UTC+2)	Çelik (yellow card) 35'; André (yellow card) 45+2'; Yazıcı (yellow card) 56'	Report	Dolberg 1', 64'; Boudaoui 5'; Atal (yellow card) 21'; Gouiri 45+3' (pen.)	Stadium: Stade Pierre-Mauroy; Attendance: 30,144; Referee: Jérôme Brisard

28 August 2021 4	Nice	4–0	Bordeaux	Nice
17:00 CEST (UTC+2)	Kluivert 7'; Gouiri 33', 42' (pen.); Boudaoui (yellow card) 45+1'; Lotomba (yellow card) 68'; Thuram 85'; Lemina (yellow card) 90+1'	Report	Koscielny (yellow card) 41'; Kwateng (yellow card) 58'	Stadium: Allianz Riviera; Attendance: 0 Referee: Jérémie Pignard

12 September 2021 5	Nantes	0–2	Nice	Nantes
17:00 CEST (UTC+2)	Girotto (yellow card) 31'; Fábio (yellow card) 51'	Report	Boudaoui (yellow card) 33'; Lemina (yellow card) 64'; Dante (yellow card) 65'; Dolberg 75'; Gouiri 80'	Stadium: Stade de la Beaujoire; Attendance: 14,597; Referee: Benoît Millot

19 September 2021 6	Nice	2–2	Monaco	Nice
13:00 CEST (UTC+2)	Delort 52'; Atal (yellow card) 58'; Boudaoui 73'; Gouiri (penalty missed) 82'; Dante (yellow card) 87'	Report	Golovin 39'; Ben Yedder 77' (pen.); Badiashile (yellow card) 81'; Diop (yellow card) 89'; Sidibé (yellow card) 90+1'	Stadium: Allianz Riviera; Attendance: 0 Referee: François Letexier

22 September 2021 7	Lorient	1–0	Nice	Lorient
21:00 CEST (UTC+2)	Monconduit 23'; Jenz (yellow card) 62' (yellow-red card) 69'	Report	Kluivert (yellow card) 22'; Gouiri (penalty missed) 55'; Rosario (yellow card) 60'; Delort (yellow card) 78'; Atal (yellow card) 79'	Stadium: Stade du Moustoir; Attendance: 10,687; Referee: Romain Lissorgue

25 September 2021 8	Saint-Étienne	0–3	Nice	Saint-Étienne
17:00 CEST (UTC+2)		Report	Gouiri 15'; Kamara (yellow card) 45'; Stengs 54'; Delort 83'; Todibo (yellow card) 90+2'	Stadium: Stade Geoffroy-Guichard; Attendance: 19,980; Referee: Amaury Delerue

2 October 2021 9	Nice	2–1	Brest	Nice
21:00 CEST (UTC+2)	Todibo 45'; Bard 61'; Rosario (yellow card) 72'	Report	Honorat 90+2'; Mbock (yellow card) 90+5'	Stadium: Allianz Riviera; Attendance: 13,503; Referee: António Nobre

17 October 2021 10	Troyes	1–0	Nice	Troyes
13:00 CEST (UTC+2)	Baldé 4'; Kouamé (yellow card) 36'; Biancone (yellow card) 73'	Report	Claude-Maurice (yellow card) 80'	Stadium: Stade de l'Aube; Attendance: 7,925; Referee: Johan Hamel

24 October 2021 11	Nice	3–2	Lyon	Nice
13:00 CEST (UTC+2)	Atal 81'; Delort 89' (pen.); Guessand 90+1', (yellow card) 90+2'	Report	Toko Ekambi 35'; Aouar 68'; Kadewere (red card) 85'	Stadium: Allianz Riviera; Attendance: 24,519; Referee: Jérôme Brisard

27 October 2021 3	Nice	1–1	Marseille	Troyes
21:00 CEST (UTC+2)	Gouiri 6'; Guessand (yellow card) 31'; Todibo (yellow card) 90+2'	Report	Payet 42'; López (yellow card) 90+1'; Kamara (yellow card) 90+3'	Stadium: Stade de l'Aube; Attendance: 0 Referee: Clément Turpin
Note: The match was originally played on 22 August 2021 at the Allianz Riviera, but was abandoned after 74 minutes, with Nice leading 1–0, due to crowd disturbances caused by Nice fans. Nice were thus deducted one point and a replay was rescheduled for 27 October, to be played at a neutral venue behind closed doors.

31 October 2021 12	Angers	1–2	Nice	Angers
13:00 CET (UTC+1)	Boufal 29' (pen.); Fulgini (yellow card) 31'	Report	Kamara (yellow card) 45+1'; Delort 57', 90+1'; Dante (yellow card) 63'	Stadium: Stade Raymond Kopa; Attendance: 6,788; Referee: Willy Delajod

7 November 2021 13	Nice	0–1	Montpellier	Nice
17:00 CET (UTC+1)	Thuram (yellow card) 63'; Bard (yellow card) 77'	Report	Mollet 80'	Stadium: Allianz Riviera; Attendance: 20,157; Referee: Antony Gautier

21 November 2021 14	Clermont	1–2	Nice	Clermont-Ferrand
17:00 CET (UTC+1)	Ogier 17'; Abdul Samed (yellow card) 53'	Report	Gouiri (yellow card) 32', (goal) 76', 82'; Rosario (yellow card) 53'; Lemina (yellow card) 65'; Delort (yellow card) 79'	Stadium: Stade Gabriel Montpied; Attendance: 11,683; Referee: Stéphanie Frappart

27 November 2021 15	Nice	0–1	Metz	Nice
21:00 CET (UTC+1)	Delort (yellow card) 21'; Stengs (yellow card) 39'	Report	N'Doram (yellow card) 4'; Jemerson (yellow card) 16'; Centonze 31'	Stadium: Allianz Riviera; Attendance: 17,033; Referee: François Letexier

1 December 2021 16	Paris Saint-Germain	0–0	Nice	Paris
21:00 CET (UTC+1)	Pereira (yellow card) 31'	Report	Kluivert (yellow card) 66'; Boudaoui (yellow card) 76'; Bard (yellow card) 88'	Stadium: Parc des Princes; Attendance: 47,502; Referee: Clément Turpin

5 December 2021 17	Nice	0–3	Strasbourg	Nice
17:00 CET (UTC+1)	Daniliuc (yellow card) 45+1'; Atal (yellow card) 66'; Rosario (yellow card) 84'	Report	Ajorque 21', (yellow card) 45+3'; Sissoko (yellow card) 35'; Bellegarde (yellow card) 47'; Diallo 82'; Thomasson 84'	Stadium: Allianz Riviera; Attendance: 16,220; Referee: Jérémie Pignard

12 December 2021 18	Rennes	1–2	Nice	Rennes
15:00 CET (UTC+1)	Bourigeaud 59'	Report	Dolberg 19' (pen.); Atal 51'	Stadium: Roazhon Park; Attendance: 27,892; Referee: Willy Delajod

22 December 2021 19	Nice	2–1	Lens	Nice
21:00 CET (UTC+1)	Lemina 63'; Kluivert 79'	Report	Haïdara (yellow card) 23'; Kalimuendo 30'; Gradit (yellow card) 90+1'	Stadium: Allianz Riviera; Attendance: 22,065; Referee: Jérôme Brisard

9 January 2022 20	Brest	0–3	Nice	Brest
13:00 CET (UTC+1)		Report	Dolberg 13'; Schneiderlin (red card) 20'; Kluivert (yellow card) 25'; Benítez (yellow card) 55'; Todibo (yellow card) 65'; Delort 79'; Gouiri 90+4'	Stadium: Stade Francis-Le Blé; Attendance: 5,102; Referee: Stéphanie Frappart

14 January 2022 21	Nice	2–1	Nantes	Nice
21:00 CET (UTC+1)	Dolberg 21' (pen.); Dante (yellow card) 44'; Thuram 56'; Amavi (yellow card) 64'	Report	Sylla (yellow card) 15'; Girotto 45'	Stadium: Allianz Riviera; Attendance: 5,000; Referee: Ruddy Buquet

23 January 2022 22	Metz	0–2	Nice	Metz
13:00 CET (UTC+1)	Kana-Biyik (yellow card) 45+1'; Mbengue (yellow card) 55'; Yade (yellow card) 57'	Report	Thuram 58'; Rosario (yellow card) 64'; Gouiri 86' (pen.)	Stadium: Stade Saint-Symphorien; Attendance: 5,000; Referee: Amaury Delerue

6 February 2022 23	Nice	0–1	Clermont	Nice
15:00 CET (UTC+1)	Boudaoui (yellow card) 26'	Report	Rashani (yellow card) 53', (goal) 77'	Stadium: Allianz Riviera; Attendance: 18,022; Referee: Jérôme Brisard

12 February 2022 24	Lyon	2–0	Nice	Décines-Charpieu
21:00 CET (UTC+1)	Dembélé 8' (pen.); Toko Ekambi 52'	Report	Todibo (yellow card) 50'	Stadium: Groupama Stadium; Attendance: 41,974; Referee: Benoît Millot

20 February 2022 25	Nice	1–0	Angers	Nice
13:00 CET (UTC+1)	Kluivert 18'; Boudaoui (yellow card) 72'; Schneiderlin (yellow card) 90+2'	Report	Doumbia (yellow card) 34'; Fulgini (yellow card) 78'	Stadium: Allianz Riviera; Attendance: 18,257; Referee: Romain Lissorgue

26 February 2022 26	Strasbourg	0–0	Nice	Strasbourg
17:00 CET (UTC+1)	Perrin (yellow card) 56'	Report	Dante (yellow card) 19' (yellow-red card) 48'; Kluivert (red card) 85'	Stadium: Stade de la Meinau; Attendance: 25,150; Referee: Stéphanie Frappart

5 March 2022 27	Nice	1–0	Paris Saint-Germain	Nice
21:00 CET (UTC+1)	Lemina (yellow card) 33'; Delort 88'	Report		Stadium: Allianz Riviera; Attendance: 31,949; Referee: Willy Delajod

12 March 2022 28	Montpellier	0–0	Nice	Montpellier
17:00 CET (UTC+1)	Estève (yellow card) 20'; Savanier (penalty missed) 39'; Wahi (yellow card) 69'; Makouana (yellow card) 90+2'	Report	Lotomba (yellow card) 22'; Boudaoui (yellow card) 32'; Dante (red card) 35'	Stadium: Stade de la Mosson; Attendance: 11,658; Referee: Clément Turpin

20 March 2022 29	Marseille	2–1	Nice	Marseille
20:45 CET (UTC+1)	Milik 45+3' (pen.); Ćaleta-Car (yellow card) 60'; Bakambu 89'; Saliba (yellow card) 90+1'	Report	Bard (yellow card) 45'; Lemina 90+2'	Stadium: Stade Vélodrome; Attendance: 64,722; Referee: Jérôme Brisard

2 April 2022 30	Nice	1–1	Rennes	Nice
17:00 CEST (UTC+2)	Todibo (yellow card) 42'; Delort 67'; Kluivert (yellow card) 84'	Report	Terrier 78'; Traoré (yellow card) 84'	Stadium: Allianz Riviera; Attendance: 24,086; Referee: Benoît Bastien

10 April 2022 31	Lens	3–0	Nice	Lens
17:05 CEST (UTC+2)	Haïdara (red card) 17'; Doucouré (yellow card) 31', (goal) 55'; Kalimuendo 51', 67'; Sotoca (yellow card) 66'	Report	Guessand (yellow card) 38'; Gouiri (yellow card) 45+3'; Lemina (yellow card) 50' (yellow-red card) 57'; Dante (red card) 90+2'	Stadium: Stade Bollaert-Delelis; Attendance: 36,668; Referee: Willy Delajod

17 April 2022 32	Nice	2–1	Lorient	Nice
13:00 CEST (UTC+2)	Daniliuc (yellow card) 45'; Delort 54' (pen.), 88'; Thuram (yellow card) 78'	Report	Jenz (yellow card) 53'; Laurienté 61'	Stadium: Allianz Riviera; Attendance: 17,212; Referee: Amaury Delerue

20 April 2022 33	Monaco	1–0	Nice	Monaco
19:00 CEST (UTC+2)	Tchouaméni (yellow card) 45'; Golovin 45+2', (yellow card) 78'; Disasi (yellow card) 52'; Martins (yellow card) 71'; Vanderson (yellow card) 81'	Report	Daniliuc (yellow card) 42'; Thuram (yellow card) 86'	Stadium: Stade Louis II; Attendance: 10,247; Referee: Benoît Millot

24 April 2022 34	Nice	1–0	Troyes	Nice
15:00 CEST (UTC+2)	Thuram 90+3'; Lotomba (yellow card) 90+4'	Report	Tardieu (yellow card) 90+4'	Stadium: Allianz Riviera; Attendance: 17,065; Referee: Hakim Ben El Hadj

1 May 2022 35	Bordeaux	0–1	Nice	Bordeaux
17:05 CEST (UTC+2)	Marcelo (yellow card) 31'	Report	Thuram (yellow card) 11'; Rosario (yellow card) 70'; Delort 74'	Stadium: Matmut Atlantique; Attendance: 23,552; Referee: Johan Hamel

11 May 2022 36	Nice	4–2	Saint-Étienne	Nice
19:00 CEST (UTC+2)	Daniliuc (yellow card) 44'; Bard 52'; Delort 60', 62'; Kluivert (yellow card) 65'; Boudaoui 80'	Report	Bouanga 11'; Maçon (yellow card) 37'; Youssouf 45+3'; Mangala (yellow card) 54'; Moukoudi (yellow card) 85'	Stadium: Allianz Riviera; Attendance: 17,704; Referee: Ruddy Buquet

14 May 2022 37	Nice	1–3	Lille	Nice
21:00 CEST (UTC+2)	Kluivert 31', (yellow card) 90+1'; Lotomba (yellow card) 45'	Report	Gudmundsson (yellow card) 12'; David 51', 62'; Gomes (yellow card) 66'; Weah (yellow card) 90+3', (goal) 90+5'	Stadium: Allianz Riviera; Attendance: 24,232; Referee: Thomas Léonard

21 May 2022 38	Reims	2–3	Nice	Reims
21:00 CEST (UTC+2)	Ekitike 9'; Doumbia 17'	Report	Dante (yellow card) 25'; Delort 75' (pen.), 77', 82'; Brahimi (yellow card) 90+2'	Stadium: Stade Auguste-Delaune; Attendance: 12,589; Referee: Eric Wattellier

=== Coupe de France ===
19 December 2021 Round of 64	SO Cholet	0–1	Nice	Cholet
18:20 CET (UTC+1)	Ruffaut (yellow card) 32'; Sylla (yellow card) 54'; Sidibé (yellow card) 62'; Fortuné (yellow card) 72'	Report	Delort (yellow card) 27', (goal) 63'; Stengs (yellow card) 29'; Kluivert (yellow card) 40'; Lotomba (yellow card) 64'; Daniliuc (yellow card) 90+2'	Stadium: Stade Omnisports Jean Bouin; Attendance: 4,000; Referee: Bastien Dechepy

2 January 2022 Round of 32	Nice	Bye	Lyon/Paris FC	Nice
--:-- CET (UTC+1)				Stadium: Allianz Riviera
Note: Nice was due to meet either Paris FC or Lyon in the round of 32, but their round of 64 match was abandoned after half time due to crowd trouble; as a result of the disqualification of both teams, Nice got a bye to the round of 16.

31 January 2022 Round of 16	Paris Saint-Germain	0–0 (5–6 p)	Nice	Paris
21:15 CET (UTC+1)	Pereira (yellow card) 24'; Kehrer (yellow card) 55'; Dagba (yellow card) 72'	Report	Gouiri (yellow card) 29'; Boudaoui (yellow card) 61'; Schneiderlin (yellow card) 76'; Todibo (yellow card) 78'; Atal (yellow card) 79'	Stadium: Parc des Princes; Attendance: 5,000; Referee: Jérémie Pignard
	Penalties
	Messi (penalty scored); Mbappé (penalty scored); Paredes (penalty missed); Draxler (penalty scored); Verratti (penalty scored); Bernat (penalty scored); Simons (penalty missed)		(penalty scored) Schneiderlin; (penalty scored) Todibo; (penalty scored) Atal; (penalty missed) Delort; (penalty scored) Gouiri; (penalty scored) Guessand; (penalty scored) Dante

9 February 2022 Quarter-finals	Nice	4–1	Marseille	Nice
21:15 CET (UTC+1)	Gouiri 10'; Kluivert 29', 49', (yellow card) 32'; Delort 61'; Daniliuc (yellow card) 90'	Report	Bard 3' (o.g.); Balerdi (yellow card) 40'	Stadium: Allianz Riviera; Attendance: 33,346; Referee: Ruddy Buquet

1 March 2022 Semi-finals	Nice	2–0	FC Versailles 78	Nice (Note: Tie reversed due to FC Versailles 78 not being able to provide a suitable stadium.)
21:00 CET (UTC+1)	Bard (yellow card) 15'; Boudaoui (yellow card) 32'; Gouiri 48'; Dolberg 73'	Report	Alledji (yellow card) 41'; Brun (yellow card) 90+1'	Stadium: Allianz Riviera; Attendance: 26,723; Referee: François Letexier

7 May 2022 Final	Nice	0–1	Nantes	Saint-Denis
21:00 CEST (UTC+2)	Todibo (yellow card) 42'; Boudaoui (yellow card) 55'; Dante (yellow card) 79'; Lemina (yellow card) 90+3'	Report	Blas 47' (pen.); Kolo Muani (yellow card) 90+3'	Stadium: Stade de France; Attendance: 78,961; Referee: Stéphanie Frappart

== Statistics ==
=== Appearances and goals ===
No.	Pos	Nat	Player	Total		Ligue 1		Coupe de France	
No.	Pos	Nat	Player	Apps	Goals	Apps	Goals	Apps	Goals
Goalkeepers
1	GK	(Poland) POL	Marcin Bułka	6	0	1	0	5	0
16	GK	(Algeria) ALG	Teddy Boulhendi	0	0	0	0	0	0
40	GK	(Argentina) ARG	Walter Benítez	37	0	37	0	0	0
Defenders
4	DF	(Brazil) BRA	Dante	38	0	33+1	0	4	0
5	DF	(Austria) AUT	Flavius Daniliuc	27	0	14+10	0	2+1	0
12	DF	(France) FRA	Jordan Amavi	9	0	4+4	0	1	0
20	DF	(Algeria) ALG	Youcef Atal	18	2	13+4	2	0+1	0
23	DF	(Switzerland) SUI	Jordan Lotomba	34	0	19+11	0	4	0
25	DF	(France) FRA	Jean-Clair Todibo	40	1	35+1	1	4	0
26	DF	(France) FRA	Melvin Bard	37	2	30+3	2	4	0
Midfielders
6	MF	(France) FRA	Morgan Schneiderlin	24	0	5+15	0	3+1	0
8	MF	(Netherlands) NED	Pablo Rosario	40	0	31+5	0	3+1	0
15	MF	(Brazil) BRA	Danilo Barbosa	1	0	1	0	0	0
18	MF	(Gabon) GAB	Mario Lemina	36	2	24+8	2	1+3	0
19	MF	(France) FRA	Khéphren Thuram	41	4	20+16	4	5	0
28	MF	(Algeria) ALG	Hicham Boudaoui	33	3	21+8	3	3+1	0
33	MF	(Canada) CAN	Justin Smith	0	0	0	0	0	0
Forwards
7	FW	(Algeria) ALG	Andy Delort	37	18	26+6	16	4+1	2
9	FW	(Denmark) DEN	Kasper Dolberg	30	7	19+7	6	2+2	1
10	FW	(France) FRA	Alexis Claude-Maurice	11	0	0+10	0	0+1	0
11	FW	(France) FRA	Amine Gouiri	43	12	32+6	10	5	2
14	FW	(France) FRA	Billal Brahimi	15	0	2+9	0	0+4	0
21	FW	(Netherlands) NED	Justin Kluivert	31	6	24+3	4	3+1	2
22	FW	(Netherlands) NED	Calvin Stengs	26	1	11+13	1	2	0
24	FW	(France) FRA	Evann Guessand	25	1	2+18	1	0+5	0
34	FW	(Republic of Ireland) IRL	Ayodeji Sotona	0	0	0	0	0	0
Players transferred out during the season
3	DF	(Brazil) BRA	Robson Bambu	0	0	0	0	0	0
7	FW	(France) FRA	Myziane Maolida	1	0	0+1	0	0	0
13	DF	(Ivory Coast) CIV	Hassane Kamara	11	0	7+4	0	0	0
14	FW	(Switzerland) SUI	Dan Ndoye	3	0	2+1	0	0	0
29	FW	(France) FRA	Lucas Da Cunha	11	0	5+5	0	0+1	0

Last updated: 21 May 2022
Source: Competitions

=== Goalscorers ===
As of 10 February 2022

Rank	No.	Pos.	Nat.	Player	Ligue 1	Coupe de France	Total
1	11	FW	(France)	Amine Gouiri	10	1	11
2	7	FW	(Algeria)	Andy Delort	6	2	8
3	9	FW	(Denmark)	Kasper Dolberg	6	0	6
4	21	FW	(Netherlands)	Justin Kluivert	2	2	4
5	19	MF	(France)	Khéphren Thuram	3	0	3
6	20	DF	(Algeria)	Youcef Atal	2	0	2
6	28	MF	(Algeria)	Hicham Boudaoui	2	0	2
8	26	DF	(France)	Melvin Bard	1	0	1
8	24	FW	(France)	Evann Guessand	1	0	1
8	18	MF	(Gabon)	Mario Lemina	1	0	1
8	22	FW	(Netherlands)	Calvin Stengs	1	0	1
8	25	DF	(France)	Jean-Clair Todibo	1	0	1
Total					36	5	41
