= 2020–21 OGC Nice season =

OGC Nice
2020–21 season
- President: Jean-Pierre Rivère
- Head coach: Patrick Vieira (until 4 December); Adrian Ursea (from 4 December)
- Stadium: Allianz Riviera
- Ligue 1: 9th
- Coupe de France: Round of 32
- UEFA Europa League: Group stage
- Top goalscorer: League: Amine Gouiri (12); All: Amine Gouiri (16)
- Biggest win: Angers 0–3 Nice; Nice 3–0 Angers; Nice 3–0 Marseille
- Biggest defeat: Bayer Leverkusen 6–2 Nice
Home colours	Away colours	Third colours

The 2020–21 season was the 94th season in the existence of OGC Nice and the club's 19th consecutive season in the top flight of French football. In addition to the domestic league, Nice participated in this season's editions of the Coupe de France and the UEFA Europa League. The season covered the period from 1 July 2020 to 30 June 2021.

The head coach Patrick Vieira was relieved of his post after a five-game losing streak. He was replaced by assistant Adrian Ursea.

== Players ==
=== First-team squad ===
Note: Flags indicate national team as defined under FIFA eligibility rules; some limited exceptions apply. Players may hold more than one non-FIFA nationality.

No.	Pos.	Nation	Player
2	DF	FRA	Stanley Nsoki
3	DF	BRA	Robson Bambu
4	DF	BRA	Dante (captain)
5	DF	AUT	Flavius Daniliuc
6	MF	FRA	Morgan Schneiderlin
7	FW	FRA	Myziane Maolida
8	MF	FRA	Pierre Lees-Melou
9	FW	DEN	Kasper Dolberg
10	FW	FRA	Alexis Claude-Maurice
11	FW	FRA	Amine Gouiri
13	DF	FRA	Hassane Kamara
14	FW	SUI	Dan Ndoye
16	GK	ALG	Teddy Boulhendi
18	DF	FRA	William Saliba (on loan from Arsenal)

No.	Pos.	Nation	Player
19	MF	FRA	Khéphren Thuram
20	DF	ALG	Youcef Atal
21	MF	BRA	Danilo Barbosa
22	MF	POR	Rony Lopes (on loan from Sevilla)
23	DF	SUI	Jordan Lotomba
24	DF	FRA	Andy Pelmard
25	DF	FRA	Jean-Clair Todibo (on loan from Barcelona)
27	MF	FRA	Alexis Trouillet
28	MF	ALG	Hicham Boudaoui
29	MF	FRA	Jeff Reine-Adélaïde (on loan from Lyon)
30	GK	FRA	Yoan Cardinale
34	FW	IRL	Deji Sotona
40	GK	ARG	Walter Benítez

=== Out on loan ===
Note: Flags indicate national team as defined under FIFA eligibility rules; some limited exceptions apply. Players may hold more than one non-FIFA nationality.

No.	Pos.	Nation	Player
—	MF	POR	Pedro Brazão (on loan to Lausanne)
—	FW	FRA	Lucas Da Cunha (on loan to Lausanne)
—	DF	CIV	Ibrahim Cissé (on loan to Châteauroux)
—	DF	CIV	Armel Zohouri (on loan to Lausanne)
—	DF	SEN	Racine Coly (on loan to Amiens)

No.	Pos.	Nation	Player
—	MF	FRA	Wylan Cyprien (on loan to Parma)
—	MF	CIV	Trazié Thomas (on loan to Lausanne)
—	FW	FRA	Evann Guessand (on loan to Lausanne)
—	FW	FRA	Ihsan Sacko (on loan to Cosenza)
—	MF	FRA	Hicham Mahou (on loan to Lausanne)

== Transfers ==
=== In ===
No.	Pos	Player	Transferred from	Fee	Date	Source
11	FW	(France) Amine Gouiri	(France) Lyon	€7m	1 July 2020	

=== Out ===
No.	Pos	Player	Transferred to	Fee	Date	Source
23	DF	(France) Malang Sarr	(England) Chelsea	Free	27 August 2020	

== Pre-season and friendlies ==
Win Draw Loss

4 July 2020 Friendly	Lyon	1–0	Nice	Décines-Charpieu, France
18:30 CEST (UTC+2)	Aouar 5' (pen.); Traoré (yellow card) 40'	Report	Benítez (yellow card) 4'	Stadium: Parc Olympique Lyonnais; Attendance: 0 Referee: Aurélien Petit

10 July 2020 Friendly	Saint-Étienne	4–1	Nice	Saint-Étienne, France
18:00 CEST (UTC+2)	Krasso 42'; Abi 48', 56'; Maçon 52'	Report	Thuram 17'	Stadium: Stade Geoffroy-Guichard; Attendance: 0 Referee: Olivier Thual

16 July 2020 2020 Veolia Cup	Nice	1–1	Celtic	Décines-Charpieu, France
18:15 CEST (UTC+2)	Dolberg 39'	Report	Klimala 72'	Stadium: Parc Olympique Lyonnais; Referee: Willy Delajod

18 July 2020 2020 Veolia Cup	Nice	0–2	Rangers	Décines-Charpieu, France
18:15 CEST (UTC+2)	Trouillet (yellow card) 8'; Kamara (yellow card) 82'	Report	Edmundson (yellow card) 38'; Defoe 40'; Barjonas 90+3'	Stadium: Parc Olympique Lyonnais; Attendance: 5,000; Referee: Jérémie Pignard

25 July 2020 Friendly	Standard Liège	1–2	Nice	Liège, Belgium
18:00 CEST (UTC+2)	Avenatti 33'	Report	Dolberg 37' (pen.); Kamara 47'	Stadium: Stade Maurice Dufrasne; Attendance: 0

1 August 2020 Friendly	DAC Dunajská Streda	0–6	Nice	Grödig, Austria
17:00 CEST (UTC+2)		Report	Gouiri 1', 83'; Maolida 3', 45+2'; Claude-Maurice 34', 54'	Stadium: Untersberg-Arena

8 August 2020 Friendly	Red Bull Salzburg	4–1	Nice	Zell am See, Austria
16:00 CEST (UTC+2)	Koïta 49'; Junuzović 54'; Berisha 59', 62'; Bernède (yellow card) 72'	Report	Gouiri 6'; Atal (yellow card) 55'	Stadium: Stadio Alois Latini

15 August 2020 Friendly	Nice	3–2	Rennes	Nice, France
19:00 CEST (UTC+2)	Dolberg 43' (pen.), 62' (pen.); Thuram 45'	Report	Aguerd 31'; Terrier 88' (pen.)	Stadium: Allianz Riviera; Attendance: 0 Referee: Florent Batta

4 September 2020 Friendly	Nice	2–3	Monaco	Nice, France
18:00 CEST (UTC+2)	Lopes 12'; Guessand 14'	Report	Daniliuc 58' (o.g.); Martins 76'; Onyekuru 88'	Stadium: Allianz Riviera; Attendance: 0

== Competitions ==
=== Overview ===
Competition	First match	Last match	Starting round	Final position	Record							
Competition	First match	Last match	Starting round	Final position	Pld	W	D	L	GF	GA	GD	Win %
Ligue 1	23 August 2020	23 May 2021	Matchday 1	9th	38	15	7	16	50	53	−3	39.47
Coupe de France	10 February 2021	8 March 2021	Round of 64	Round of 32	2	1	0	1	3	3	+0	50.00
UEFA Europa League	22 October 2020	10 December 2020	Group stage	Group stage	6	1	0	5	8	16	−8	16.67
Total					46	17	7	22	61	72	−11	36.96

Source: Soccerway

=== Ligue 1 ===
==== League table ====
Pos	Team	Pld	W	D	L	GF	GA	GD	Pts
7	Lens	38	15	12	11	55	54	+1	57
8	Montpellier	38	14	12	12	60	62	−2	54
9	Nice	38	15	7	16	50	53	−3	52
10	Metz	38	12	11	15	44	48	−4	47
11	Saint-Étienne	38	12	10	16	42	54	−12	46

Source: Ligue 1
Rules for classification: 1) Points; 2) Goal difference; 3) Goals scored; 4) Head-to-head goal difference; 5) Fairplay ranking.

==== Results summary ====
Overall								Home						Away					
Pld	W	D	L	GF	GA	GD	Pts	W	D	L	GF	GA	GD	W	D	L	GF	GA	GD
38	15	7	16	50	53	−3	52	7	3	9	25	30	−5	8	4	7	25	23	+2

Source: Ligue 1

==== Results by round ====
Round	1	2	3	4	5	6	7	8	9	10	11	12	13	14	15	16	17	18	19	20	21	22	23	24	25	26	27	28	29	30	31	32	33	34	35	36	37	38
Ground	H	A	A	H	A	H	A	H	A	H	A	H	A	H	A	H	H	A	A	H	A	H	A	H	A	H	A	H	A	H	A	H	A	H	A	H	H	A
Result	W	W	L	L	D	W	W	D	W	L	L	L	D	L	W	L	D	L	D	L	W	L	L	W	L	L	W	W	D	W	W	D	L	W	L	W	L	W
Position	3	1	7	10	10	8	4	5	4	8	8	11	11	12	11	13	12	13	13	14	12	14	14	13	14	16	12	11	12	11	10	9	10	9	10	9	9	9

Source: Ligue 1
A = Away; H = Home; W = Win; D = Draw; L = Loss

==== Matches ====
The league fixtures were announced on 9 July 2020.

23 August 2020 1	Nice	2–1	Lens	Nice
17:00 CEST (UTC+2)	Dante (yellow card) 10'; Gouiri 23', 75'; Kamara (yellow card) 45+2'	Report	Kakuta 11' (pen.); Medina (yellow card) 41'; Cahuzac (yellow card) 51'; Boura (yellow card) 71'	Stadium: Allianz Riviera; Referee: Jérôme Miguelgorry

29 August 2020 2	Strasbourg	0–2	Nice	Strasbourg
21:00 CEST (UTC+2)	Koné (yellow card) 36'; Djiku (yellow card) 73'	Report	Lotomba (yellow card) 13'; Schneiderlin (yellow card) 17'; Dante (yellow card) 24'; Sylvestre (yellow card) 27'; Dolberg 37' (pen.), 59', (yellow card) 45+2'; Lees-Melou (yellow card) 42'	Stadium: Stade de la Meinau; Referee: Jérôme Brisard

12 September 2020 3	Montpellier	3–1	Nice	Montpellier
17:00 CEST (UTC+2)	Laborde 18'; Congré 50', 64'	Report	Maolida (yellow card) 40'; Dante 69'; Dolberg (yellow card) 82'	Stadium: Stade de la Mosson; Referee: Antony Gautier

20 September 2020 4	Nice	0–3	Paris Saint-Germain	Nice
13:00 CEST (UTC+2)	Schneiderlin (yellow card) 88'	Report	Mbappé 38' (pen.); Verratti (yellow card) 43'; Di María 45+1'; Marquinhos 66'; Bakker (yellow card) 82'	Stadium: Allianz Riviera; Referee: Benoît Bastien

27 September 2020 5	Bordeaux	0–0	Nice	Bordeaux
13:00 CEST (UTC+2)	Sabaly (yellow card) 15'	Report	Gouiri (yellow card) 90+4'	Stadium: Matmut Atlantique; Referee: François Letexier

3 October 2020 6	Nice	2–1	Nantes	Nice
21:00 CEST (UTC+2)	Dante 27'; Thuram (yellow card) 28', (goal) 62'; Pelmard (yellow card) 45+5'	Report	Girotto (red card) 3'; Louza 45+5' (pen.); Pallois (yellow card) 56'	Stadium: Allianz Riviera; Referee: Jérôme Brisard

18 October 2020 7	Saint-Étienne	1–3	Nice	Saint-Étienne
17:00 CEST (UTC+2)	Aouchiche 57'; Moukoudi (yellow card) 72'; Hamouma (yellow card) 90+3'	Report	Lees-Melou 8'; Gouiri 30'; Kamara (yellow card) 50'; Nsoki (yellow card) 58'; Benítez (yellow card) 67'; Lotomba (yellow card) 68'; Bambu (yellow card) 73'; Maolida 90+1'	Stadium: Stade Geoffroy-Guichard; Referee: Amaury Delerue

25 October 2020 8	Nice	1–1	Lille	Nice
17:00 CET (UTC+1)	Lees-Melou (yellow card) 10'; Dolberg 50'	Report	Botman (yellow card) 43'; Yılmaz 58', (yellow card) 78'; Luiz Araújo (yellow card) 64'; Çelik (yellow card) 75'; Fonte (yellow card) 84'; Maignan (yellow card) 89'	Stadium: Allianz Riviera; Referee: Frank Schneider

1 November 2020 9	Angers	0–3	Nice	Angers
15:00 CET (UTC+1)	Bernardoni (yellow card) 22'; Doumbia (yellow card) 35'; Coulibaly (yellow card) 80'; Thomas (yellow card) 87'; Mangani (yellow card) 90+1'	Report	Lopes 12', (yellow card) 40'; Lees-Melou 23' (pen.); Bambu (yellow card) 36'; Boudaoui 77'	Stadium: Stade Raymond Kopa; Attendance: 0 Referee: Jérémy Stinat

8 November 2020 10	Nice	1–2	Monaco	Nice
17:00 CET (UTC+1)	Boudaoui (yellow card) 19'; Lees-Melou 69'; Schneiderlin (yellow card) 69'	Report	Disasi 23'; Diop 53', (yellow card) 69'; Ben Yedder (yellow card) 75'	Stadium: Allianz Riviera; Attendance: 0 Referee: Karim Abed

29 November 2020 12	Nice	1–3	Dijon	Nice
17:00 CET (UTC+1)	Danilo (yellow card) 24'; Gouiri (yellow card) 34', (goal) 80' (pen.); Boudaoui (yellow card) 57'	Report	Baldé 21', 66'; Muzinga 31', (yellow card) 69'; Diop (yellow card) 83'; Konaté (yellow card) 90+4'	Stadium: Allianz Riviera; Attendance: 0 Referee: François Letexier

6 December 2020 13	Reims	0–0	Nice	Reims
17:00 CET (UTC+1)	Dia (yellow card) 59'	Report	Boudaoui (yellow card) 16'; Danilo (yellow card) 85'	Stadium: Stade Auguste-Delaune; Attendance: 0 Referee: Stéphanie Frappart

13 December 2020 14	Nice	0–1	Rennes	Nice
13:00 CET (UTC+1)	Nsoki (yellow card) 71'; Gouiri (yellow card) 90+5'	Report	Niang 28'; Traoré (yellow card) 63'	Stadium: Allianz Riviera; Attendance: 0 Referee: Amaury Delerue

16 December 2020 15	Nîmes	0–2	Nice	Nîmes
19:00 CET (UTC+1)	Roux (yellow card) 60'	Report	Schneiderlin (yellow card) 28' (yellow-red card) 57'; Ndoye 85'; Claude-Maurice 90+3'	Stadium: Stade des Costières; Attendance: 0 Referee: Ruddy Buquet

19 December 2020 16	Nice	1–4	Lyon	Nice
21:00 CET (UTC+1)	Gouiri 44'; Thuram (yellow card) 57'	Report	Depay 32' (pen.); Kadewere 39'; Toko Ekambi 63'; Cornet (yellow card) 66'; Aouar 73'	Stadium: Allianz Riviera; Attendance: 0 Referee: Antony Gautier

23 December 2020 17	Nice	2–2	Lorient	Nice
19:00 CET (UTC+1)	Lotomba 18', (yellow card) 90'; Reine-Adélaïde 34', (yellow card) 90+2'; Boudaoui (yellow card) 73'; Bambu (red card) 81'	Report	Laporte (yellow card) 38'; Monconduit (yellow card) 44'; Lemoine (yellow card) 45+1'; Moffi 49'; Grbić 82' (pen.); Le Fée (yellow card) 90+2'	Stadium: Allianz Riviera; Attendance: 0 Referee: Aurélien Petit

6 January 2021 18	Brest	2–0	Nice	Brest
19:00 CET (UTC+1)	Mounié 23'; Honorat 28', (yellow card) 52'; Lasne (yellow card) 72'	Report	Saliba (yellow card) 11'; Gouiri (yellow card) 63'; Mahou (yellow card) 90+1'	Stadium: Stade Francis-Le Blé; Attendance: 0 Referee: Jérémy Stinat

9 January 2021 19	Metz	1–1	Nice	Metz
21:00 CET (UTC+1)	Kouyaté (yellow card) 17'; Maziz (yellow card) 36'; Boye 79'	Report	Gouiri 18' (pen.); Nsoki (yellow card) 67'; Boudaoui (yellow card) 76'	Stadium: Stade Saint-Symphorien; Attendance: 0 Referee: Johan Hamel

17 January 2021 20	Nice	0–3	Bordeaux	Nice
15:00 CET (UTC+1)		Report	Bašić (yellow card) 33', (goal) 87'; Hwang 50'; Baysse 75'	Stadium: Allianz Riviera; Attendance: 0 Referee: Thomas Léonard

23 January 2021 21	Lens	0–1	Nice	Lens
17:00 CET (UTC+1)	Cahuzac (yellow card) 61'; Fortès (yellow card) 68'	Report	Atal 49'; Boudaoui (yellow card) 90'	Stadium: Stade Bollaert-Delelis; Attendance: 0 Referee: Hakim Ben El Hadj

31 January 2021 22	Nice	0–1	Saint-Étienne	Nice
13:00 CET (UTC+1)	Bambu (yellow card) 48'; Boudaoui (yellow card) 68'	Report	Moukoudi (yellow card) 41'; Gourna-Douath (yellow card) 78'; Abi 88'	Stadium: Allianz Riviera; Attendance: 0 Referee: Frank Schneider

3 February 2021 23	Monaco	2–1	Nice	Monaco
21:00 CET (UTC+1)	Ben Yedder 28' (pen.), 51'	Report	Todibo (yellow card) 17'; Claude-Maurice (yellow card) 34'; Schneiderlin (yellow card) 40'; Lees-Melou 47'; Lotomba (yellow card) 50'	Stadium: Stade Louis II; Attendance: 0 Referee: Jérôme Brisard

7 February 2021 24	Nice	3–0	Angers	Nice
15:00 CET (UTC+1)	Doumbia 9' (o.g.); Todibo (yellow card) 15'; Maolida 17'; Gouiri (yellow card) 36', (goal) 83'	Report	Amadou (yellow card) 33'	Stadium: Allianz Riviera; Attendance: 0 Referee: Jérôme Miguelgorry

13 February 2021 25	Paris Saint-Germain	2–1	Nice	Paris
17:00 CET (UTC+1)	Draxler 22'; Kean 76'; Mbappé (yellow card) 87'; Herrera (yellow card) 89'	Report	Lopes 50'	Stadium: Parc des Princes; Attendance: 0 Referee: Jérémie Pignard

17 February 2021 11	Marseille	3–2	Nice	Marseille
21:00 CET (UTC+1)	Álvaro 14'; Khaoui 42', 53'; Kamara (yellow card) 44'; Sakai (yellow card) 90+3'	Report	Gouiri 47'; Lees-Melou (yellow card) 73'; Sellouki 87'	Stadium: Stade Vélodrome; Attendance: 0 Referee: Mikael Lesage
Note: The match originally scheduled for 21 November 2020, but postponed after more than ten Nice players tested positive for COVID-19.

21 February 2021 26	Nice	1–2	Metz	Nice
15:00 CET (UTC+1)	Gouiri 61' (pen.); Sellouki (yellow card) 90+1'	Report	Kouyaté 15', (yellow card) 90+1'; Gueye 38'	Stadium: Allianz Riviera; Attendance: 0 Referee: Jérémy Stinat

26 February 2021 27	Rennes	1–2	Nice	Rennes
21:00 CET (UTC+1)	Terrier 39'	Report	Gouiri 19' (pen.); Nsoki (yellow card) 37'; Todibo (yellow card) 56'; Daniliuc 58'	Stadium: Roazhon Park; Attendance: 0 Referee: Johan Hamel

3 March 2021 28	Nice	2–1	Nîmes	Nice
19:00 CET (UTC+1)	Gouiri 4'; Atal (yellow card) 54'; Claude-Maurice 75'; Schneiderlin (yellow card) 79'; Lotomba (yellow card) 90+3'	Report	Landre 50'; Meling (yellow card) 55'; Fomba (yellow card) 60'; Guessoum (yellow card) 90+1'	Stadium: Allianz Riviera; Attendance: 0 Referee: Hakim Ben El Hadj

14 March 2021 29	Lorient	1–1	Nice	Lorient
15:00 CET (UTC+1)	Boisgard (yellow card) 3'; Wissa 66'; Abergel (yellow card) 73'	Report	Kamara (yellow card) 42'; Maolida 58'; Schneiderlin (yellow card) 73'	Stadium: Stade du Moustoir; Attendance: 0 Referee: Ruddy Buquet

20 March 2021 30	Nice	3–0	Marseille	Nice
17:00 CET (UTC+1)	Thuram 34'; Gouiri 74'; Benítez (yellow card) 90'; Claude-Maurice 90+1'	Report	Ćaleta-Car (yellow card) 78'	Stadium: Allianz Riviera; Attendance: 0 Referee: François Letexier

4 April 2021 31	Nantes	1–2	Nice	Nantes
15:00 CEST (UTC+2)	Touré 32'; Pallois (yellow card) 43'	Report	Dolberg 11' (pen.), 29'; Maolida (yellow card) 61'; Benítez (yellow card) 72'	Stadium: Stade de la Beaujoire; Attendance: 0 Referee: Stéphanie Frappart

11 April 2021 32	Nice	0–0	Reims	Nice
15:00 CEST (UTC+2)		Report	Touré (yellow card) 88'	Stadium: Allianz Riviera; Attendance: 0 Referee: Jérémy Stinat

18 April 2021 33	Dijon	2–0	Nice	Dijon
15:00 CEST (UTC+2)	Chafik (yellow card) 19', (goal) 49'; Benzia 77' (pen.)	Report	Schneiderlin (yellow card) 51'	Stadium: Stade Gaston Gérard; Attendance: 0 Referee: Johan Hamel

25 April 2021 34	Nice	3–1	Montpellier	Nice
13:00 CEST (UTC+2)	Boudaoui 6', (yellow card) 59'; Todibo 39'; Claude-Maurice 40'	Report	Laborde 3'; Mollet (yellow card) 56'; Wahi (yellow card) 66'	Stadium: Allianz Riviera; Attendance: 0 Referee: Bastien Dechepy

1 May 2021 35	Lille	2–0	Nice	Villeneuve-d'Ascq
21:00 CEST (UTC+2)	Yılmaz 13'; Çelik (yellow card) 21', (goal) 56'; Xeka (yellow card) 87'	Report	Claude-Maurice (yellow card) 27'; Lotomba (yellow card) 34' (yellow-red card) 48'	Stadium: Stade Pierre-Mauroy; Attendance: 0 Referee: Amaury Delerue

9 May 2021 36	Nice	3–2	Brest	Nice
15:00 CEST (UTC+2)	Lopes 38'; Lees-Melou (red card) 52'; Boudaoui 60'; Todibo (yellow card) 70'; Kamara 89'	Report	Mounié 4', 43'; Jean Lucas (yellow card) 64'	Stadium: Allianz Riviera; Attendance: 0 Referee: Thomas Léonard

16 May 2021 37	Nice	0–2	Strasbourg	Nice
21:00 CEST (UTC+2)	Saliba (yellow card) 26'; Boudaoui (yellow card) 58'	Report	Ajorque 2', 66'; Thomasson (yellow card) 38'	Stadium: Allianz Riviera; Attendance: 0 Referee: Mikael Lesage

23 May 2021 38	Lyon	2–3	Nice	Décines-Charpieu
21:00 CEST (UTC+2)	Toko Ekambi 14', 40'; Marcelo (yellow card) 56'	Report	Dolberg 27'; Thuram (yellow card) 45+1'; Kamara 50'; Saliba 57'; Todibo (yellow card) 65'	Stadium: Parc Olympique Lyonnais; Attendance: 0 Referee: Benoît Millot

=== Coupe de France ===
10 February 2021 Round of 64	Nîmes	1–3	Nice	Nîmes
17:00 CET (UTC+1)	Duljević 36'	Report	Lopes 13', 29'; Lees-Melou 82'	Stadium: Stade des Costières; Attendance: 0 Referee: Amaury Delerue

8 March 2021 Round of 32	Nice	0–2	Monaco	Nice
21:00 CET (UTC+1)	Saliba (yellow card) 75'; Nsoki (yellow card) 86'	Report	Volland 29'; Majecki (yellow card) 62'; Aguilar 87'	Stadium: Allianz Riviera; Attendance: 0 Referee: Benoît Bastien

=== UEFA Europa League ===
==== Group stage ====
The group stage draw was held on 2 October 2020.

Pos	Team	Pld	W	D	L	GF	GA	GD	Pts	Qualification	LEV	SLP	HBS	NCE
1	(Germany) Bayer Leverkusen	6	5	0	1	21	8	+13	15	Advance to knockout phase	—	4–0	4–1	6–2
2	(Czech Republic) Slavia Prague	6	4	0	2	11	10	+1	12	Advance to knockout phase	1–0	—	3–0	3–2
3	(Israel) Hapoel Be'er Sheva	6	2	0	4	7	13	−6	6		2–4	3–1	—	1–0
4	(France) Nice	6	1	0	5	8	16	−8	3		2–3	1–3	1–0	—

Source: UEFA
Rules for classification: Group stage tiebreakers

22 October 2020 1	Bayer Leverkusen (Germany)	6–2	(France) Nice	Leverkusen, Germany
18:55 CEST (UTC+2)	Amiri 11'; Alario 16'; Baumgartlinger (yellow card) 40'; L. Bender (yellow card) 45'; Wendell (yellow card) 57'; Diaby 61'; Bellarabi 79', 83'; Wirtz 87'	Report	Gouiri 31', (yellow card) 32'; Nsoki (yellow card) 50'; Claude-Maurice 90'	Stadium: BayArena; Attendance: 0 (Note: Due to the COVID-19 pandemic in Europe, the match was played behind closed doors.); Referee: Fran Jović (Croatia)

29 October 2020 2	Nice (France)	1–0	(Israel) Hapoel Be'er Sheva	Nice, France
21:00 CET (UTC+1)	Gouiri 23'; Kamara (yellow card) 54'; Schneiderlin (yellow card) 59'	Report	Bareiro (yellow card) 36'; Josué (yellow card) 59'; Agudelo (yellow card) 61'; Vítor (yellow card) 86'	Stadium: Allianz Riviera; Attendance: 0 Referee: Chris Kavanagh (England)

5 November 2020 3	Slavia Prague (Czech Republic)	3–2	(France) Nice	Prague, Czech Republic
18:55 CET (UTC+1)	Holeš (yellow card) 14'; Kuchta 16', 71', (yellow card) 57'; Sima (yellow card) 22', (goal) 43'; Hovorka (yellow card) 61'	Report	Schneiderlin (yellow card) 25'; Gouiri 33'; Lees-Melou (yellow card) 55'; Daniliuc (yellow card) 61'; Reine-Adélaïde (yellow card) 83'; Ndoye 90+3'	Stadium: Sinobo Stadium; Attendance: 0 Referee: Jakob Kehlet (Denmark)

26 November 2020 4	Nice (France)	1–3	(Czech Republic) Slavia Prague	Nice, France
21:00 CET (UTC+2)	Nsoki (yellow card) 43'; Atal (yellow card) 53'; Gouiri 61'; Schneiderlin (yellow card) 74'; Bambu (yellow card) 77'; Boudaoui (yellow card) 90+1' (yellow-red card) 90+2'	Report	Lingr 15'; Zima (yellow card) 41'; Bořil (yellow card) 55'; Olayinka 64'; Sima 75'; Kúdela (yellow card) 90+2'	Stadium: Allianz Riviera; Attendance: 0 Referee: Glenn Nyberg (Sweden)

3 December 2020 5	Nice (France)	2–3	(Germany) Bayer Leverkusen	Nice, France
21:00 CET (UTC+1)	Kamara 26'; Ndoye (yellow card) 39', (goal) 47'; Daniliuc (yellow card) 90+3'	Report	Demirbay (yellow card) 12'; Diaby 22'; Dragović 32'; Baumgartlinger 51'	Stadium: Allianz Riviera; Attendance: 0 Referee: Maurizio Mariani (Italy)

10 December 2020 6	Hapoel Be'er Sheva (Israel)	1–0	(France) Nice	Petah Tikva, Israel
18:55 CET (UTC+1)	Taha (yellow card) 41'; Yosefi (yellow card) 45+2'; Hatuel 72'; Keltjens (yellow card) 79'; Tzedek (yellow card) 90'	Report	Schneiderlin (yellow card) 36'; Thuram (yellow card) 45+1'	Stadium: HaMoshava Stadium (Note: Hapoel Be'er Sheva played their home matches at HaMoshava Stadium, Petah Tikva, instead of their regular home stadium Turner Stadium, Be'er Sheva, due to the stadium was declared a dangerous building by the Be'er Sheva cityhall for structural problems.); Attendance: 0 Referee: Kristo Tohver (Estonia)

== Statistics ==
=== Appearances and goals ===
No.	Pos	Nat	Player	Total		Ligue 1		Coupe de France		UEFA Europa League	
No.	Pos	Nat	Player	Apps	Goals	Apps	Goals	Apps	Goals	Apps	Goals
Goalkeepers
16	GK	(Algeria) ALG	Teddy Boulhendi	0	0	0	0	0	0	0	0
30	GK	(France) FRA	Yoan Cardinale	1	0	0	0	0	0	1	0
40	GK	(Argentina) ARG	Walter Benítez	45	0	38	0	2	0	5	0
Defenders
2	DF	(France) FRA	Stanley Nsoki	24	0	13+5	0	2	0	4	0
3	DF	(Brazil) BRA	Robson Bambu	23	0	12+3	0	1+1	0	6	0
4	DF	(Brazil) BRA	Dante	11	2	9	2	0	0	2	0
5	DF	(Austria) AUT	Flavius Daniliuc	26	1	15+8	1	1	0	2	0
13	DF	(France) FRA	Hassane Kamara	42	3	34+2	2	1+1	0	4	1
18	DF	(France) FRA	William Saliba	26	1	20	1	2	0	2+2	0
20	DF	(Algeria) ALG	Youcef Atal	18	1	13+5	1	0	0	0	0
23	DF	(Switzerland) SUI	Jordan Lotomba	36	1	24+6	1	0+1	0	4+1	0
24	DF	(France) FRA	Andy Pelmard	24	0	12+7	0	1	0	2+2	0
25	DF	(France) FRA	Jean-Clair Todibo	17	1	15	1	1+1	0	0	0
33	DF	(France) FRA	Théo Pionnier	1	0	0	0	0	0	1	0
38	DF	(France) FRA	Noah Crétier	1	0	0	0	0	0	0+1	0
Midfielders
6	MF	(France) FRA	Morgan Schneiderlin	35	0	24+4	0	2	0	5	0
8	MF	(France) FRA	Pierre Lees-Melou	33	5	23+6	4	2	1	2	0
19	MF	(France) FRA	Khéphren Thuram	33	2	17+12	2	0+1	0	2+1	0
22	MF	(Portugal) POR	Rony Lopes	33	5	23+5	3	1	2	3+1	0
27	MF	(France) FRA	Alexis Trouillet	8	0	1+4	0	1	0	1+1	0
28	MF	(Algeria) ALG	Hicham Boudaoui	29	3	22+3	3	0	0	1+3	0
29	MF	(France) FRA	Jeff Reine-Adélaïde	18	1	12+2	1	0	0	2+2	0
35	MF	(France) FRA	Malik Sellouki	4	1	0+4	1	0	0	0	0
Forwards
7	FW	(France) FRA	Myziane Maolida	25	3	11+8	3	1+1	0	2+2	0
9	FW	(Denmark) DEN	Kasper Dolberg	29	6	21+4	6	0+1	0	3	0
10	FW	(France) FRA	Alexis Claude-Maurice	37	5	21+9	4	1	0	4+2	1
11	FW	(France) FRA	Amine Gouiri	41	16	31+3	12	2	0	5	4
14	FW	(Switzerland) SUI	Dan Ndoye	34	3	3+25	1	1	0	1+4	2
34	FW	(Republic of Ireland) IRL	Deji Sotona	0	0	0	0	0	0	0	0
36	FW	(France) FRA	Salim Ben Seghir	2	0	0+1	0	0	0	0+1	0
Players transferred out during the season
12	DF	(Senegal) SEN	Racine Coly	3	0	0+1	0	0	0	1+1	0
32	DF	(France) FRA	Hicham Mahou	3	0	0+2	0	0	0	0+1	0
21	MF	(Brazil) BRA	Danilo Barbosa	5	0	3+1	0	0	0	1	0

Last updated: 23 May 2021
Source: Competitions

=== Goalscorers ===
As of 26 February 2021

Rank	No.	Pos.	Nat.	Name	Ligue 1	Coupe de France	Europa League	Total
1	11	FW	(France)	Amine Gouiri	10	0	4	14
2	8	MF	(France)	Pierre Lees-Melou	4	1	0	5
3	22	MF	(Portugal)	Rony Lopes	2	2	0	4
4	9	FW	(Denmark)	Kasper Dolberg	3	0	0	3
4	14	FW	(Switzerland)	Dan Ndoye	1	0	2	3
6	4	DF	(Brazil)	Dante	2	0	0	2
6	7	FW	(France)	Myziane Maolida	2	0	0	2
6	10	FW	(France)	Alexis Claude-Maurice	1	0	1	2
9	5	DF	(Austria)	Flavius Daniliuc	1	0	0	1
9	13	MF	(France)	Hassane Kamara	0	0	1	1
9	19	MF	(France)	Khéphren Thuram	1	0	0	1
9	20	DF	(Algeria)	Youcef Atal	1	0	0	1
9	23	DF	(Switzerland)	Jordan Lotomba	1	0	0	1
9	28	MF	(Algeria)	Hicham Boudaoui	1	0	0	1
9	29	MF	(France)	Jeff Reine-Adélaïde	1	0	0	1
9	33	MF	(France)	Malik Sellouki	1	0	0	1
Own goals					1	0	0	1
Totals					33	3	8	44
