= Hicham Boudaoui =

Algerian footballer (born 1999)

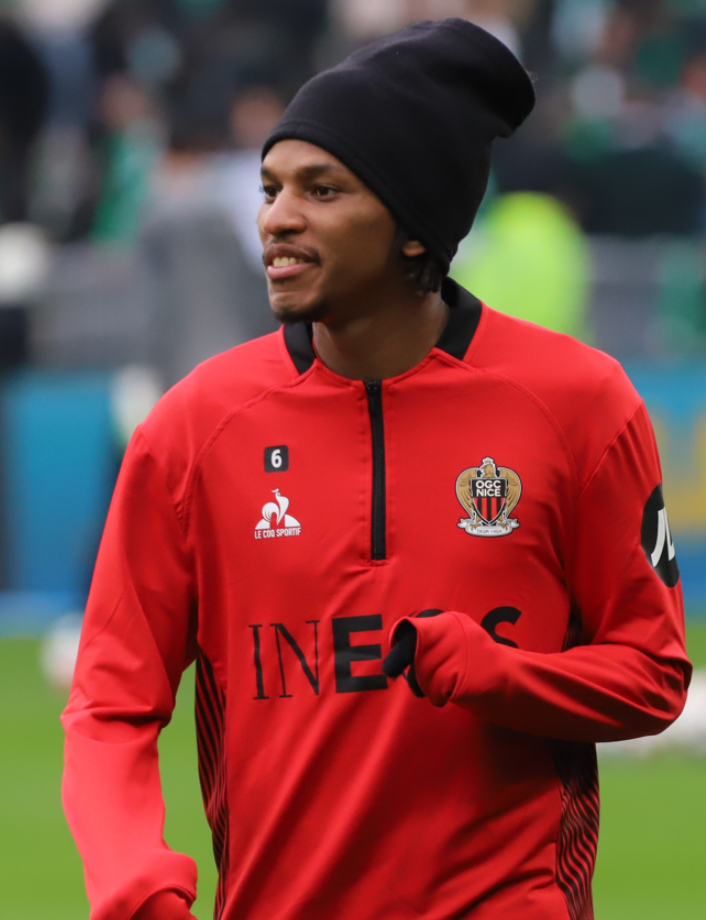
- Boudaoui with Nice in 2025

Personal information
- Full name: Hicham Boudaoui
- Date of birth: 23 September 1999 (age 27)
- Place of birth: Béchar, Algeria
- Height: 1.75 m (5 ft 9 in)
- Position: Midfielder

Team information
- Current team: Nice
- Number: 6

Youth career
- 2012–2018: Paradou AC

Senior career*
Years	Team	Apps	(Gls)
2018–2019	Paradou AC	37	(1)
2019–	Nice	176	(13)
2019	Nice II	2	(0)

International career^{‡}
2018	Algeria U20	4	(0)
2018–	Algeria U23	4	(0)
2018–	Algeria	37	(0)
Medal record
Men's football
Representing Algeria
Africa Cup of Nations
Winner	2019 Egypt
- * Club domestic league appearances and goals as of 22:42, 18 October 2026 (UTC) ‡ National team caps and goals as of 2 July 2026 (UTC)

Hicham Boudaoui (Arabic: هشام بوداوي; born 23 September 1999) is an Algerian professional footballer who plays as a midfielder for Ligue 1 club Nice and the Algeria national team.

== Club career ==
On 6 January 2018, Boudaoui made his professional debut for Paradou AC, coming as a second-half substitute in a league match against USM Alger.

In September 2019, he joined Ligue 1 side Nice.

== International career ==
Boudaoui made his debut for the Algeria national team on 27 December 2018 in a friendly against Qatar, as a starter. He was named in Algeria's national team squad for the 2019 Africa Cup of Nations in Egypt.

In December 2023, he was named in Algeria's squad for the 2023 Africa Cup of Nations. He has also appeared for Algeria U20 and Algeria U23 teams.

== Career statistics ==
=== Club ===
As of match played 18 October 2026

Appearances and goals by club, season and competition
Club	Season	League			National cup		League cup		Continental		Other		Total	
Club	Season	Division	Apps	Goals	Apps	Goals	Apps	Goals	Apps	Goals	Apps	Goals	Apps	Goals
Paradou AC	2017–18	Algerian Ligue 1	7	0	0	0	—		—		—		7	0
Paradou AC	2018–19	Algerian Ligue 1	30	1	4	0	—		—		—		34	1
Paradou AC	Total		37	1	4	0	—		—		—		41	1
Nice	2019–20	Ligue 1	9	1	3	1	1	0	—		—		13	2
Nice	2020–21	Ligue 1	25	3	0	0	—		4 (Note: Appearances in UEFA Europa League)	0	—		29	3
Nice	2021–22	Ligue 1	29	3	4	0	—		—		—		33	3
Nice	2022–23	Ligue 1	27	1	0	0	—		8 (Note: Appearances in UEFA Europa Conference League)	0	—		35	1
Nice	2023–24	Ligue 1	29	2	0	0	—		—		—		29	2
Nice	2024–25	Ligue 1	29	2	2	0	—		5	0	—		36	2
Nice	2025–26	Ligue 1	25	1	2	0	—		4 (Note: One appearance in UEFA Champions League, three appearances in UEFA Europa League)	0	1 (Note: Appearance in Ligue 1 relegation/promotion play-offs)	0	32	1
Nice	2026–27	Ligue 1	3	0	0	0	—		—		—		3	0
Nice	Total		176	13	11	1	1	0	21	0	1	0	210	14
Nice II	2019–20	Championnat National 2	2	0	—		—		—		—		2	0
Career total			215	14	15	1	1	0	21	0	1	0	253	15

=== International ===
As of match played 2 July 2026

Appearances and goals by national team and year
National team	Year	Apps	Goals
Algeria	2018	1	0
Algeria	2019	5	0
Algeria	2021	4	0
Algeria	2022	1	0
Algeria	2023	5	0
Algeria	2024	4	0
Algeria	2025	10	0
Algeria	2026	7	0
Total		37	0

== Honours ==
Nice

- Coupe de France runner-up: 2021–22, 2025–26

Algeria

- Africa Cup of Nations: 2019

Individual

- Nice Young Player of the Season: 2019–20
