= Kasper Dolberg =

Danish footballer (born 1997)

- Dolberg with Ajax in 2026

Personal information
- Full name: Kasper Dolberg Rasmussen
- Date of birth: 6 October 1997 (age 29)
- Place of birth: Silkeborg, Denmark
- Height: 1.87 m (6 ft 2 in)
- Position: Striker

Team information
- Current team: Ajax
- Number: 9

Youth career
- 2005–2010: GFG Voel
- 2010–2014: Silkeborg

Senior career*
Years	Team	Apps	(Gls)
2014–2015	Silkeborg	3	(0)
2015–2019	Ajax	78	(33)
2019–2023	Nice	74	(23)
2022	→ Sevilla (loan)	4	(0)
2023	→ TSG Hoffenheim (loan)	13	(1)
2023–2025	Anderlecht	73	(34)
2025–	Ajax	28	(5)

International career^{‡}
2013	Denmark U16	7	(1)
2013–2014	Denmark U17	8	(5)
2015	Denmark U19	8	(2)
2016	Denmark U21	1	(1)
2016–	Denmark	56	(12)
- * Club domestic league appearances and goals as of 19 September 2026 (UTC) ‡ National team caps and goals as of 5 September 2025 (UTC)

Kasper Dolberg Rasmussen (Danish pronunciation: [ˈkʰæspɐ ˈtʌlˌpɛɐ̯ˀ]; born 6 October 1997) is a Danish professional footballer who plays as a striker for Eredivisie club Ajax and the Denmark national team.

Dolberg made his senior debut for Silkeborg in May 2015. He joined Ajax in July 2015 and debuted for the club in July 2016. He represented Denmark at under-16, under-17, under-19 and under-21 level before making his senior international debut in November 2016.

In May 2020, Dolberg was voted as player of the year by the fans of his club Nice. While at Ajax, he was named Dutch Football Talent of the year after his first season in the Eredivisie in 2017.

== Club career ==
=== Silkeborg ===
On 17 May 2015, he made his senior debut for Silkeborg in a Danish Superliga game against Brøndby, replacing Adeola Lanre Runsewe after 63 minutes in a 0–2 loss.

=== Ajax ===
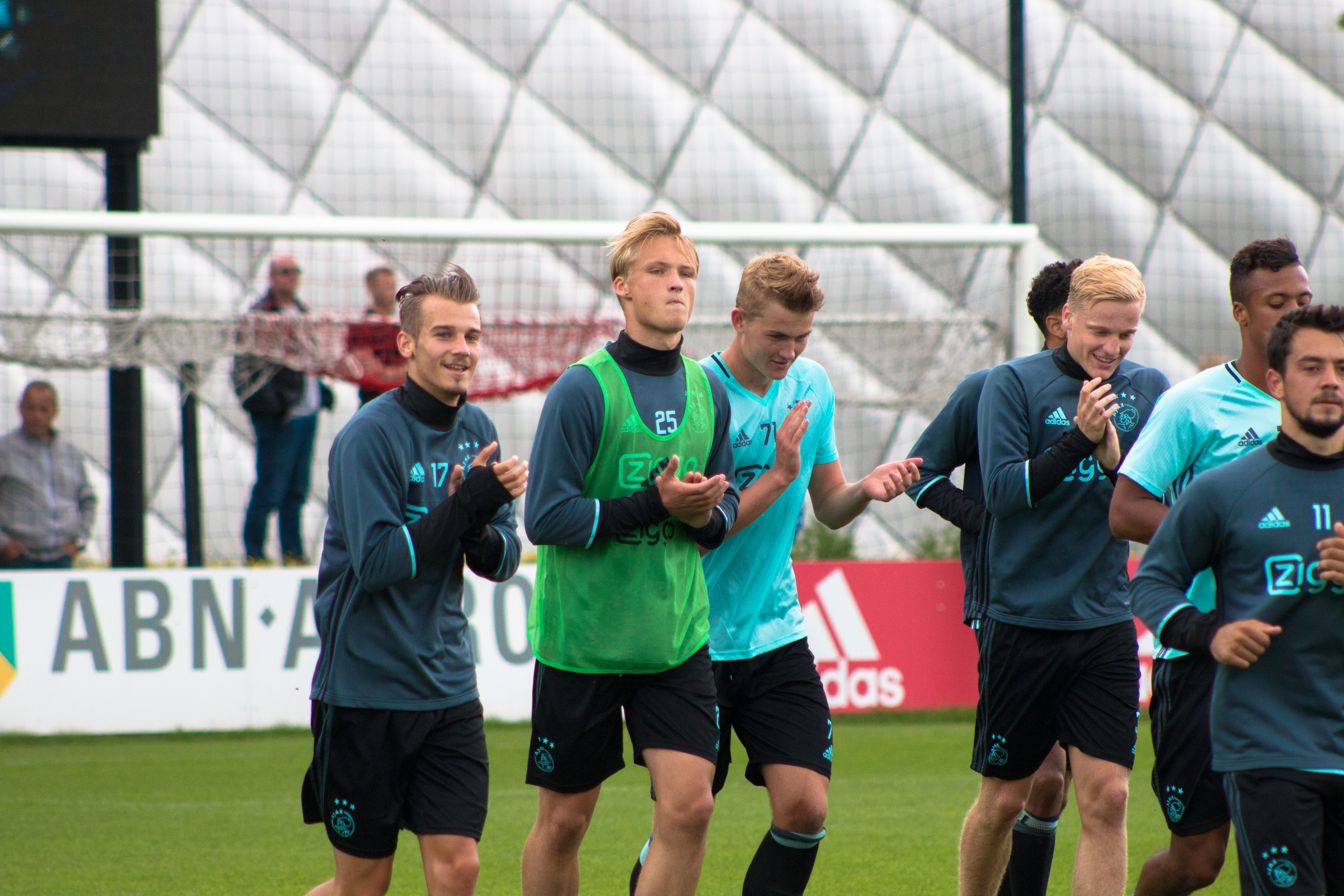
Dolberg with Ajax teammates (including Matthijs de Ligt and Donny van de Beek) in 2016.

On 5 January 2015, Ajax announced that 17-year-old Dolberg would join from Silkeborg in the summer, signing a three-year contract valid from summer 2015 until summer 2018. He had been spotted by Danish scout John Steen Olsen, the same scout who discovered players such as Zlatan Ibrahimović, Viktor Fischer, and Christian Eriksen for the Dutch club.

On 13 May 2016, Dolberg agreed to have his contract extended until 2021. On 26 July 2016, Dolberg scored his first goal in European competition on his competitive debut for Ajax, in a 1–1 Champions League qualification match against PAOK. He made his Eredivisie debut for the club on 7 August 2016 in a match against Sparta Rotterdam, coming on as a substitute for Mateo Cassierra. The following week he was in the starting line-up for the league match against Roda JC and he scored both of Ajax's goals in the 2–2 draw, his first goals in the Eredivisie.

On 29 September 2016, Dolberg scored the only goal in a 1–0 victory over Standard Liège in a Europa League match. He scored another goal in his first Klassieker against Ajax's great rival Feyenoord on 23 October 2016, securing a 1–1 draw away in Rotterdam. On 20 November 2016, he scored a first-half hat-trick in an Eredivisie match against NEC. This made him the youngest non-Dutch player ever to score a hattrick for Ajax.

On 9 March 2017, Dolberg scored the equalizer in what ended in a 2–1 loss to Copenhagen in the round of 16 of the 2016–17 UEFA Europa League campaign, thus ending a club record eight-month period in which Copenhagen had not conceded any goals at their home ground at the Parken Stadium since 20 August 2016.

=== Nice ===
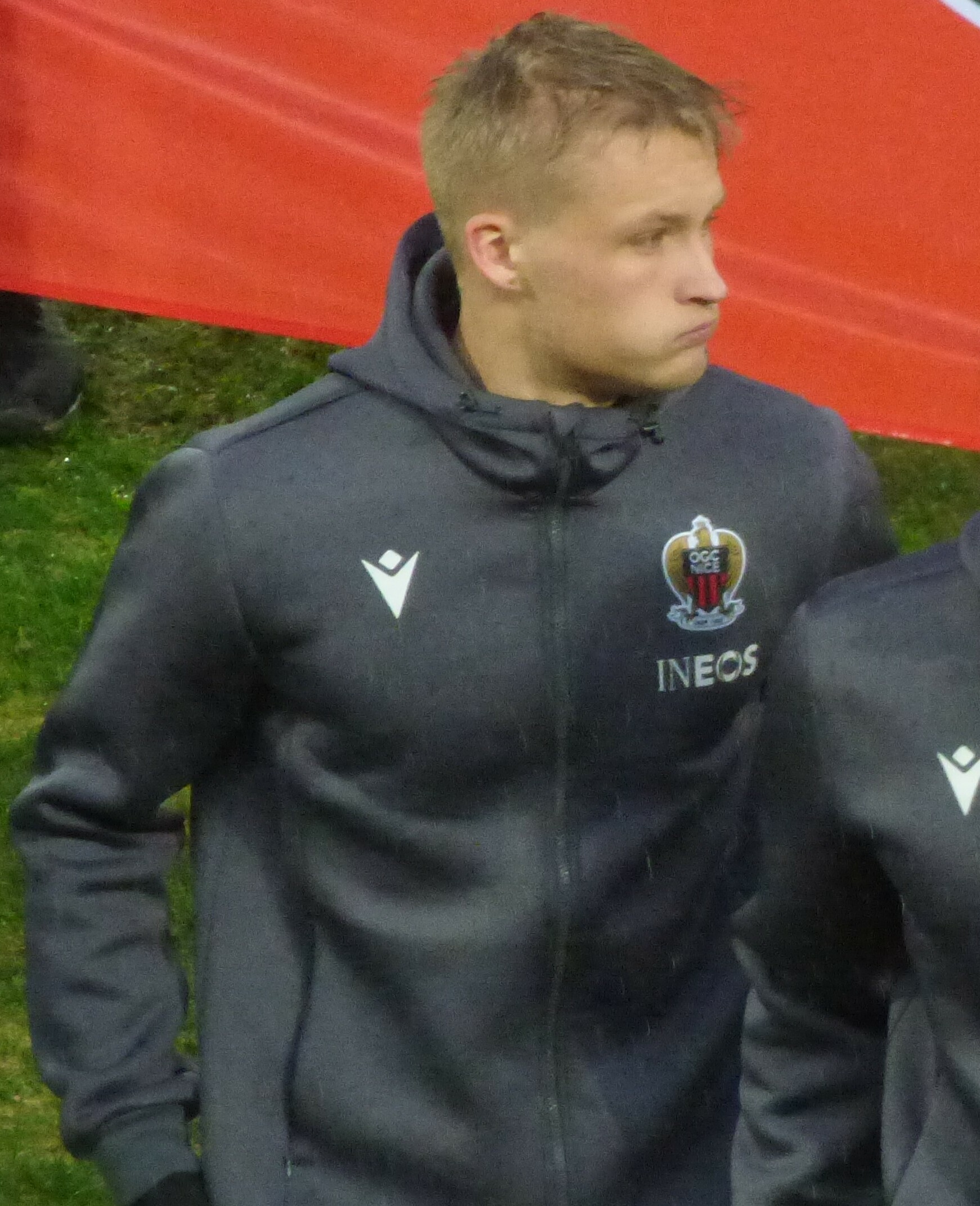
Dolberg warming up with Nice in 2021

Dolberg signed for Nice in Ligue 1 on 29 August 2019 for a fee of 20.5 million euros. He finished his first season in France as the club's top scorer with 11 goals and was named the club's player of the season, as Nice finished in fifth place, securing a spot in the group stage for next season's UEFA Europa League.

Dolberg started the 2020–21 season with a brace on 29 August 2020 against Strasbourg, securing his team a 2–0 away win.

==== Loan to Sevilla ====
Dolberg joined La Liga club Sevilla on loan on 1 September 2022, initially planned to last for a season. However, the loan was terminated prematurely on 2 January 2023, with Dolberg only making eight appearances for the Spanish club.

==== Loan to TSG Hoffenheim ====
On 2 January 2023, Dolberg was loaned to Bundesliga side Hoffenheim for the remainder of the 2022–23 season.

=== Anderlecht ===
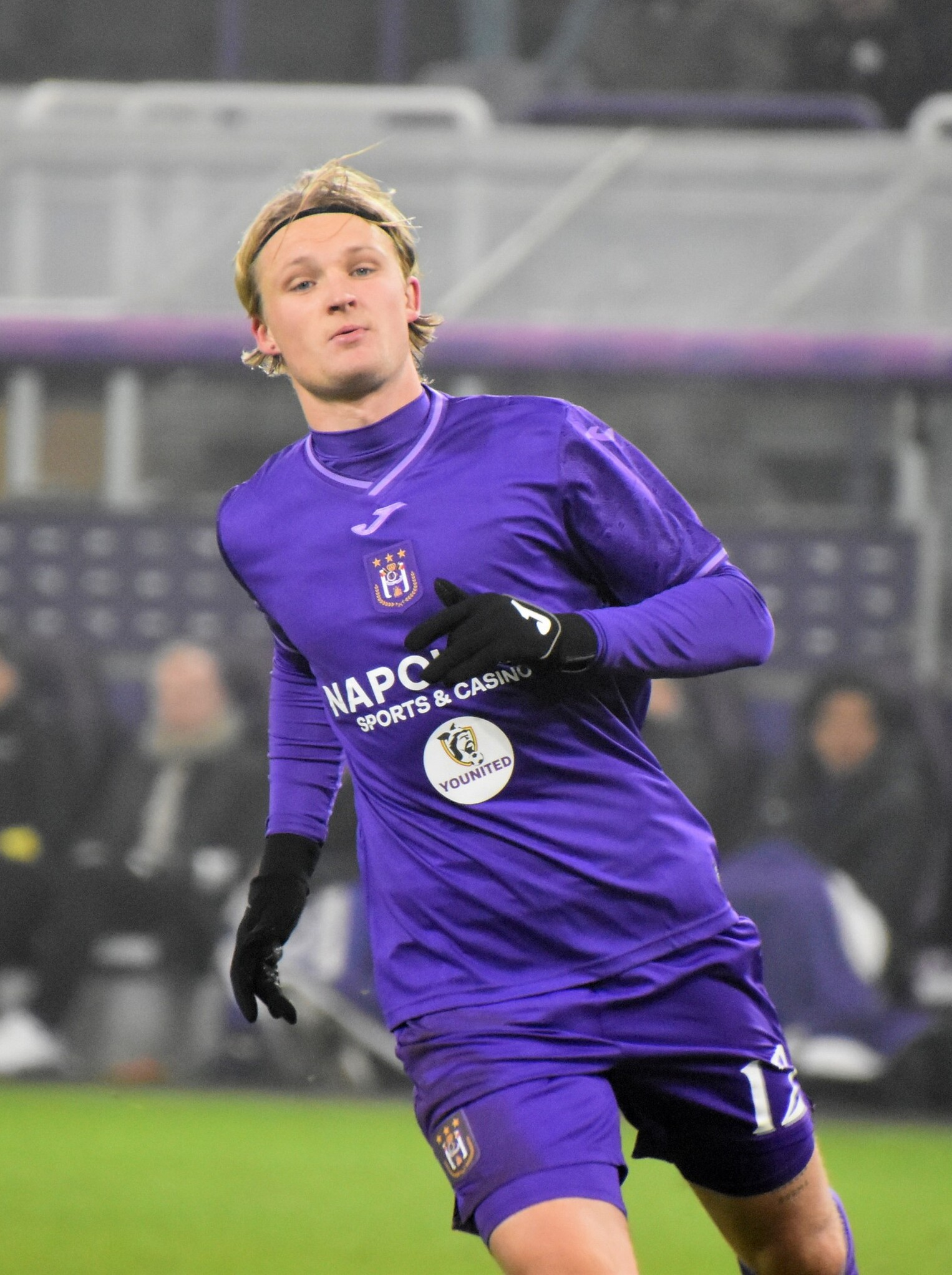
Dolberg playing for Anderlecht in 2024

On 7 July 2023, Belgian Pro League club Anderlecht announced the signing of Dolberg from Nice on a four-year contract, playing under fellow Dane Brian Riemer. Dolberg scored his first goal for Anderlecht on 6 August 2023, the winner in a 1–0 victory over Royal Antwerp, and Anderlecht finished third in his first season at the club.

Dolberg was named Belgian Player of the Month for November 2024, thanks to scoring 12 goals in six domestic games, including two hat-tricks in three domestic games against Tubize-Braine in the Belgian Cup and Cercle Brugge in the league.

On 23 April 2025, Dolberg scored four goals against Gent in a Pro League Champions' Playoffs match, totalling his tally to 18 goals in the domestic competition.

=== Return to Ajax ===
On 2 September 2025, Ajax announced the return of Dolberg to the club, signing a contract until 2029.

== International career ==
In November 2016, Dolberg received his first call-up to the senior Denmark squad for matches against Kazakhstan and Czech Republic. On 11 November 2016, he made his senior international debut, coming on as a second-half substitute in a 4–1 victory for Denmark over Kazakhstan. On 10 June 2017, in a 1–3 away win against Kazakhstan in the qualifiers for the 2018 World Cup, he came on as a substitute for Yussuf Poulsen after 68 minutes and scored his first international goal in the 81st minute.

In June 2018 he was named in Denmark's squad for the 2018 FIFA World Cup in Russia.

In May 2021, he was selected in the final 26-man squad for the postponed UEFA Euro 2020 tournament. Dolberg made his first start in the tournament, replacing the injured Yussuf Poulsen, in Denmark's round of 16 tie against Wales on 26 June and scored twice in a 4–0 win. He scored his third goal of the tournament in the quarter-finals against Czech Republic after a spectacular cross from Joakim Mæhle.

== Personal life ==
On 16 September 2019, Dolberg reported to the police that his luxury watch at an estimated value of €70,000 was stolen. Following a police investigation, in which the police recovered a surveillance video showing the culprit stealing the watch, his OGC Nice teammate Lamine Diaby-Fadiga confessed to the crime ten days later. Diaby was later sacked by the club.

On 8 November 2021, Dolberg announced that he had been diagnosed with Type 1 diabetes.

== Career statistics ==
=== Club ===
As of match played 19 September 2026

Appearances and goals by club, season and competition
Club	Season	League			National cup (Note: Includes KNVB Cup, Coupe de France, DFB-Pokal, Belgian Cup)		Europe		Other		Total	
Club	Season	Division	Apps	Goals	Apps	Goals	Apps	Goals	Apps	Goals	Apps	Goals
Silkeborg	2014–15	Danish Superliga	3	0	0	0	—		—		3	0
Ajax	2016–17	Eredivisie	29	16	2	0	17 (Note: Four appearances and one goal in UEFA Champions League, thirteen appearances and six goals in UEFA Europa League)	7	—		48	23
Ajax	2017–18	Eredivisie	23	6	3	3	4 (Note: Two appearances in UEFA Champions League, two appearances in UEFA Europa League)	0	—		30	9
Ajax	2018–19	Eredivisie	25	11	4	1	9 (Note: Appearance(s) in UEFA Champions League)	0	—		38	12
Ajax	2019–20	Eredivisie	1	0	—		1	0	1 (Note: Appearance in Johan Cruyff Shield)	1	3	1
Ajax	Total		78	33	9	4	31	7	1	1	119	45
Nice	2019–20	Ligue 1	23	11	3	0	—		0	0	26	11
Nice	2020–21	Ligue 1	25	6	1	0	3 (Note: Appearances in UEFA Europa League)	0	—		29	6
Nice	2021–22	Ligue 1	26	6	4	1	—		—		30	7
Nice	Total		74	23	8	1	3	0	—		85	24
Sevilla (loan)	2022–23	La Liga	4	0	0	0	4	0	—		8	0
TSG Hoffenheim (loan)	2022–23	Bundesliga	13	1	1	1	—		—		14	2
Anderlecht	2023–24	Belgian Pro League	39	15	3	0	—		—		42	15
Anderlecht	2024–25	Belgian Pro League	31	18	5	5	9	1	—		45	24
Anderlecht	2025–26	Belgian Pro League	3	1	—		6 (Note: Two appearances and two goals in UEFA Europa League, four appearances and two goals in UEFA Conference League)	4	—		9	5
Anderlecht	Total		73	34	8	5	15	5	—		96	44
Ajax	2025–26	Eredivisie	22	3	1	0	5	2	2 (Note: Appearances in Eredivisie European play-offs)	0	30	5
Ajax	2026–27	Eredivisie	6	2	0	0	3 (Note: Appearances in UEFA Conference League)	1	—		9	3
Ajax	Total		28	5	1	0	8	3	2	0	39	8
Career total			273	96	27	11	61	15	3	1	364	123

=== International ===
As of match played 5 September 2025

Appearances and goals by national team and year
National team	Year	Apps	Goals
Denmark	2016	1	0
Denmark	2017	3	1
Denmark	2018	6	0
Denmark	2019	7	4
Denmark	2020	5	0
Denmark	2021	10	5
Denmark	2022	8	1
Denmark	2023	3	0
Denmark	2024	11	0
Denmark	2025	2	1
Total		56	12

As of match played 10 June 2025. Denmark score listed first, score column indicates score after each Dolberg goal.

International goals by date, venue, cap, opponent, score, result and competition
No.	Date	Venue	Cap	Opponent	Score	Result	Competition
1	10 June 2017	Almaty Central Stadium, Almaty, Kazakhstan	3	Kazakhstan	3–1	3–1	2018 FIFA World Cup qualification
2	10 June 2019	Parken Stadium, Copenhagen, Denmark	13	Georgia	1–0	5–1	UEFA Euro 2020 qualifying
3	10 June 2019	Parken Stadium, Copenhagen, Denmark	13	Georgia	3–1	5–1	UEFA Euro 2020 qualifying
4	15 October 2019	Aalborg Stadium, Aalborg, Denmark	15	Luxembourg	2–0	4–0	Friendly
5	15 October 2019	Aalborg Stadium, Aalborg, Denmark	15	Luxembourg	3–0	4–0	Friendly
6	28 March 2021	MCH Arena, Herning, Denmark	23	Moldova	1–0	8–0	2022 FIFA World Cup qualification
7	28 March 2021	MCH Arena, Herning, Denmark	23	Moldova	6–0	8–0	2022 FIFA World Cup qualification
8	26 June 2021	Johan Cruyff Arena, Amsterdam, Netherlands	28	Wales	1–0	4–0	UEFA Euro 2020
9	26 June 2021	Johan Cruyff Arena, Amsterdam, Netherlands	28	Wales	2–0	4–0	UEFA Euro 2020
10	3 July 2021	Olympic Stadium, Baku, Azerbaijan	29	Czech Republic	2–0	2–1	UEFA Euro 2020
11	25 September 2022	Parken Stadium, Copenhagen, Denmark	37	France	1–0	2–0	2022–23 UEFA Nations League A
12	10 June 2025	Odense Stadium, Odense, Denmark	55	Lithuania	3–0	5–0	Friendly

== Honours ==
Ajax

- Eredivisie: 2018–19
- KNVB Cup: 2018–19
- Johan Cruyff Shield: 2019
- UEFA Europa League runner-up: 2016–17

Nice

- Coupe de France runner-up: 2021–22

Anderlecht

- Belgian Cup runner-up: 2024–25

Individual

- Danish Talent of the Year: 2016
- Ajax Talent of the Year (Marco van Basten Award): 2017
- Johan Cruyff Trophy: 2016–17
- OGC Nice Player of the Season: 2019–20
- Belgian Bronze Shoe: 2024
