= US Quevilly-Rouen Métropole =

Association football club in France

Quevilly-Rouen
- Full name: Union sportive de Quevilly Rouen Métropole
- Nicknames: Les rouges et jaunes (The red and yellows)
- Short name: USQRM, QRM
- Founded: 1902; 124 years ago
- Ground: Stade Robert Diochon
- Capacity: 8,372
- Chairman: Michel Mallet
- Manager: Gabriel Santos
- League: Ligue 3
- 2025–26: Championnat National, 13th of 17
- Website: qrm.fr
Home colours	Away colours

Union sportive de Quevilly Rouen Métropole (French pronunciation: [ynjɔ̃ spɔʁtiv də kəviji ʁwɑ̃ metʁɔpɔl]), known as US Quevilly-Rouen, US Quevilly, QRM; French pronunciation: [ky.ɛʁ‿ɛm], Quevilly-Rouen, or simply Quevilly, is a football club based in Le Petit-Quevilly in the Métropole Rouen Normandie, France. The club plays in the third-tier Championnat National and hosts its home matches at the Stade Robert Diochon, which has a capacity of 8,372.

Founded in 1902, the team reached the Coupe de France final in 1927 and its performances in cup and amateur competitions saw it invited to Division 2 in 1970. It was relegated two years later for not being able to afford lighting, being dissolved and re-entering in the tenth tier in 1978. The team reached the Coupe de France semi-final in 2010 and the final in 2012, and returned to the second tier in the 2017–18 season and from 2021–2024.

At the request of local government, Quevilly joined with historic rivals FC Rouen to form US Quevilly-Rouen Métropole in 2015, with Quevilly providing the president, manager and most players while playing at Rouen's stadium and using their red colour instead of Quevilly's yellow and black. Both teams continue to exist independently, and Rouen ended its collaboration in 2018.

== History ==
=== Foundation, first cup final and decline ===
The club was founded as US Quevilly in 1902 by Amable Lozai and Jules Manneville, two former members of a hiking club whose president had refused to purchase a football. In two years' time, the team had 104 players and Lozai bought its first pitch for half a French franc. In 1905, they began playing against other teams in Normandy such as Le Havre AC and SM Caen, and adopted yellow and black as their colours. The pitch was taken in 1910 to build a quarry but a local man named Albert Lebas gave the club part of his land for the Stade Porte-de-Diane, which opened in 1912. Several Quevilly players were killed in World War I.

In 1919, after the end of the war, Quevilly joined the nascent French Football Federation (FFF) and began playing in its Normandy League. In the early 1920s, it signed six British players. In the 1926–27 Coupe de France, the team beat Amiens, neighbours Rouen, Suisse Paris and Stade Raphaëlois to make the final where they lost 3–0 to Marseille at the Stade Olympique in Colombes. It was the first such final to be attended by a President of France, namely Gaston Doumergue. The team became dominant in Normandy in the 1930s as Le Havre and Rouen turned professional and played in national leagues. In October 1944, shortly after the Normandy landings, Quevilly played a match against the British Royal Marines for the benefit of player Henri Mallet who had lost his arm in the conflict.

Quevilly won France's amateur championship in 1954, 1955 and 1958. The following year, co-founder and chairman Lozai died, with his widow Micheline inheriting the team. In 1970, the FFF expanded Division 2 with several leading amateur teams including Quevilly, whose opponents included the newly founded Paris Saint-Germain. Michel Tron-Lozai, grandson of the founder, was unable to afford the lighting to permit the team to stay in the division, resulting in a return to amateur football in 1972.

=== Refoundation and second cup final ===
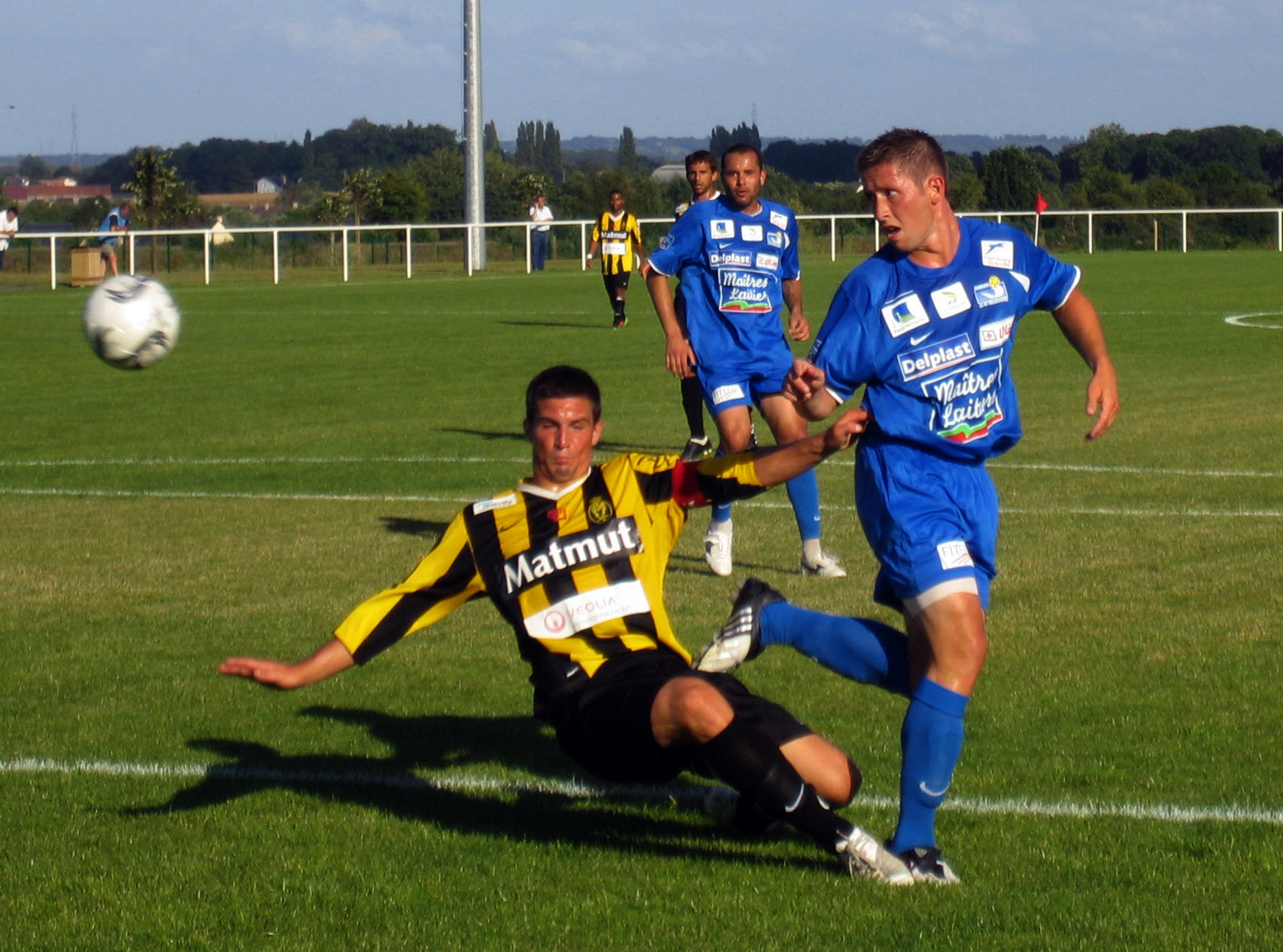
Quevilly (yellow and black) playing against Cherbourg in July 2010

In January 1979, local man Robert Beauchamp refounded US Quevilly but failed in a bid to have the team restored to the second division, instead being placed in the fourth division of the department of Seine-Maritime, the 10th and lowest possible tier. The team got back to the fifth-tier Championnat de France Amateur 2 in 2000, and reached the last 16 of the 2004–05 Coupe de France, losing 2–0 at Ligue 2 club Sedan. In the 2009–10 edition, the now fourth-tier team won 1–0 against Ligue 1 club Rennes in the last 16 with a goal from Gregory Beaugrard, followed by a 3–1 home win over another top-flight team Boulogne in the quarter-finals. The run ended in the semi-finals against PSG on 14 April 2010 at Caen's Stade Michel d'Ornano, Mevlüt Erdinç scoring the only goal for the Parisians.

In the 2011–12 Coupe de France, Quevilly won 3–2 against manager Didier Deschamps' Marseille in the quarter-finals, again at Caen, with two extra-time goals by John-Christophe Ayina. The semi-final at the same ground was won 2–1 over Rennes to put Quevilly in the final for the first time in 85 years, and making them the first amateurs in the final since Amiens in 2001. Lyon won the final, with a first-half goal by Lisandro López.

=== Union and promotions ===
In April 2015, US Quevilly joined with FC Rouen to form US Quevilly-Rouen Métropole, taking the place of US Quevilly in the fourth-tier Championnat de France Amateur for the 2015–16 season. The collaboration was initiated by the Métropole Rouen Normandie, who provided €200,000 of its €1.5 million budget, with the aim of promotion to the Championnat National within two years and Ligue 2 within three to five. As Quevilly was ranked two divisions higher than Rouen, it provided the president, manager and most players, while playing at Rouen's Stade Robert Diochon; both clubs continued to exist independently. The team initially played home games in Rouen's red with trim of Quevilly's yellow, and the inverse away from home.

The new team won Group A of the 2015–16 Championnat de France amateur, gaining promotion to the 2016–17 Championnat National. As runners-up to Châteauroux, they achieved instant promotion again to the 2017–18 Ligue 2. Beginning the season playing home games in front of low crowds at the Stade Marie-Marvingt in Le Mans due to works on the Stade Robert Diochon, the team were relegated back. Rouen ended its involvement in the team in June 2018.

Promotion back to Ligue 2 was secured on 28 April 2021, after other results ensured the club a top-two finish in the 2020–21 Championnat National behind SC Bastia and at the expense of Villefranche. A year later, the team kept themselves in the division after winning 5–1 on aggregate against Villefranche in the promotion-relegation playoffs. In 2022–23, under Olivier Echouafni, the club came 11th in the league, but were eliminated from the 7th round of the Coupe de France on penalties away to fifth-tier Aubervilliers. The club were relegated the following season, with two games left to play.

== Coaching staff ==
Position	Name
Manager	(France) Jean-Louis Garcia
Assistant Managers	(France) Alain Wathelet (France) William Louiron
Goalkeeper Coach	(France) David Moulin
Fitness Coach	(France) Simon Lucq (France) Théo Freulard
Video Analyst	(France) Clément Marie
Doctor	(France) Thibault Mariasiewiez
Physio	(France) Matthieu Hedouin
Team Manager	(France) Laurent Saint-Martin

== Squad ==
As of 5 September 2026.

Note: Flags indicate national team as defined under FIFA eligibility rules; some limited exceptions apply. Players may hold more than one non-FIFA nationality.

No.	Pos.	Nation	Player
2	DF	FRA	Marius Ros
3	DF	FRA	Ewan Hornech
4	DF	MLI	Alassane Diaby
5	DF	ALG	Yacine Gaya
6	MF	FRA	Evan Gafour
7	MF	FRA	Samuel Come Ruiz
8	MF	CGO	Warren Tchimbembé
9	FW	FRA	Junior Burban
11	FW	SEN	Djiby Seck
14	FW	FRA	Mathys Jean-Marie
16	GK	FRA	Mathys Silistrie (on loan from Rennes)
17	MF	FRA	Djibril Sarr

No.	Pos.	Nation	Player
18	DF	FRA	Mathis Hamdi
19	DF	FRA	Youssef Gazzaoui
20	FW	FRA	Gabin Capuano (on loan from Lens)
21	MF	CGO	Natanaël Bouekou
22	DF	FRA	Ruben Rosa
23	FW	COD	Noah Ndeke
26	DF	FRA	Virgil Thérésin
27	DF	FRA	Théo Pionnier
28	DF	COD	Schinear Mopila
29	FW	POR	Ricardo Coutinho
40	GK	FRA	Timothé Viel

== Honours ==
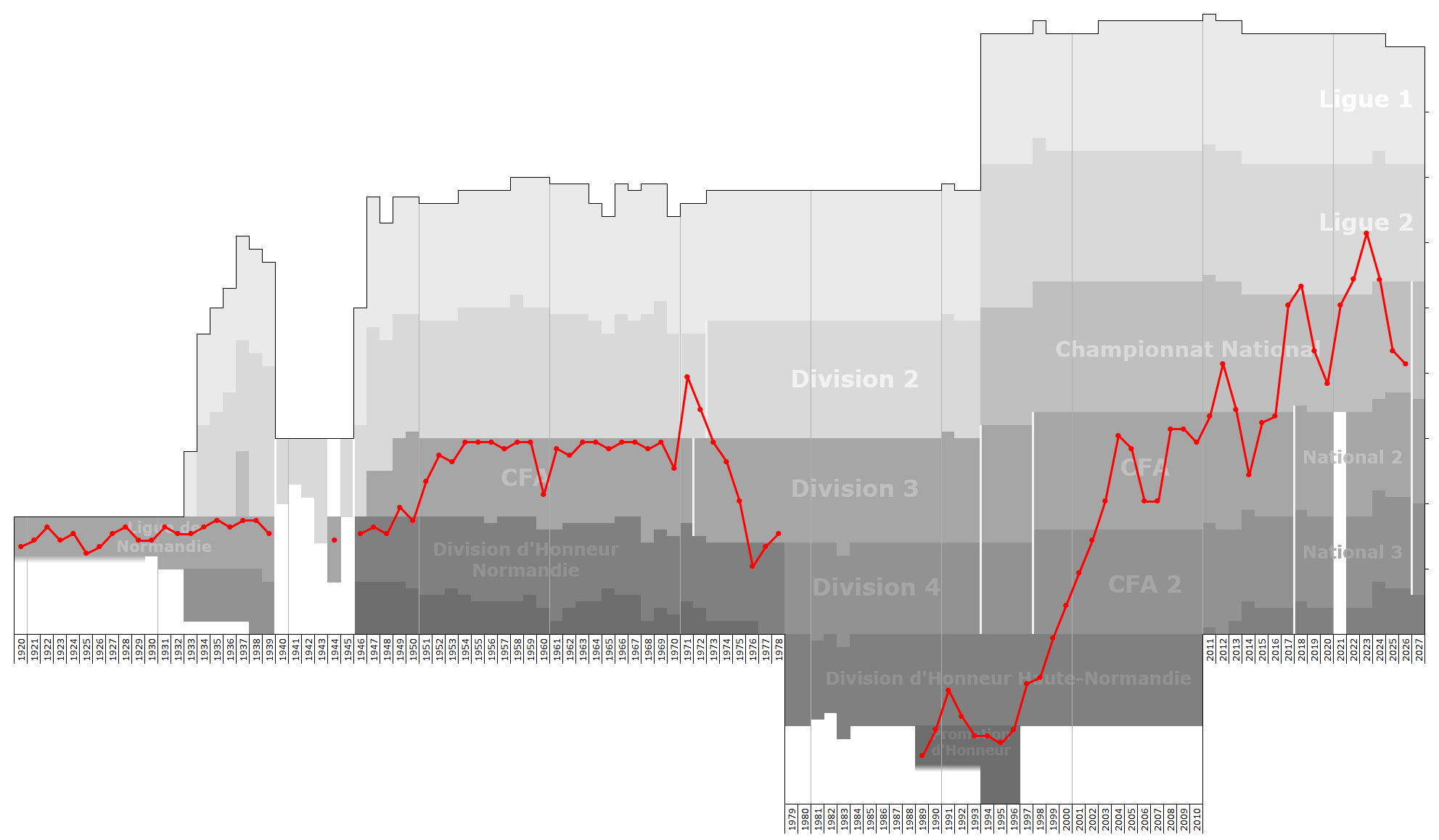
Historical league performance chart of US Quevilly-Rouen

National

- Finalist of Coupe de France in 1927, 2012
- Semi-finalist of Coupe de France: 1968, 2010
- Champion de France Amateur: 1954, 1955, 1958, 1967
- Champion du Groupe Ouest: 1954, 1955, 1956, 1959, 1966, 1967
- Champion du Groupe Nord: 1958, 1963, 1964, 1969
- Champion du Groupe A: 2011
- Champion de France Amateur Runner-up: 1959, 1963
- Division 3
  - Finalist: 1973
  - Champion du Groupe Ouest: 1973

Youth

- Coupe Gambardella
  - Champion: 1967
  - Runner-up: 1960
