= Amine Gouiri =

Footballer (born 2000)

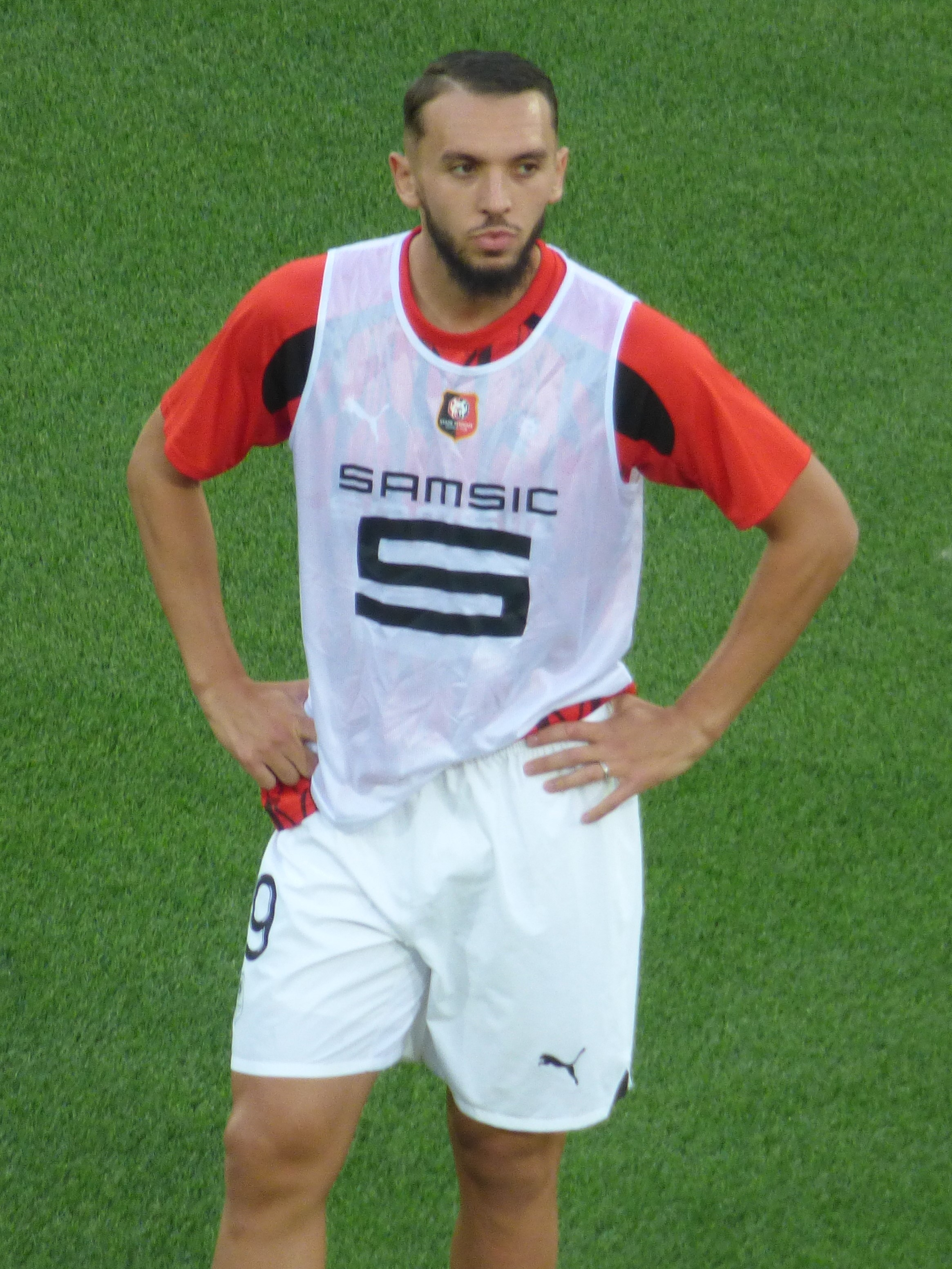
- Gouiri with Rennes in 2023

Personal information
- Full name: Amine Ferid Gouiri
- Date of birth: 16 February 2000 (age 26)
- Place of birth: Bourgoin-Jallieu, France
- Height: 1.81 m (5 ft 11 in)
- Positions: Striker; left winger

Team information
- Current team: Marseille
- Number: 9

Youth career
- 2007–2011: Isle d'Abeau FC
- 2011–2013: Bourgoin-Jallieu
- 2013–2017: Lyon

Senior career*
Years	Team	Apps	(Gls)
2016–2020	Lyon B	33	(14)
2017–2020	Lyon	8	(0)
2020–2022	Nice	75	(22)
2022–2025	Rennes	83	(25)
2025–	Marseille	47	(26)

International career^{‡}
2016	France U16	11	(4)
2016–2017	France U17	13	(15)
2017–2018	France U18	5	(7)
2018	France U19	8	(5)
2019	France U20	6	(5)
2019–2023	France U21	31	(12)
2023–	Algeria	27	(11)
- * Club domestic league appearances and goals as of 21:42, 22 November 2026 (UTC) ‡ National team caps and goals as of 2 July 2026

Amine Ferid Gouiri (born 16 February 2000) is a professional footballer who plays as a striker or left winger for Ligue 1 club Marseille. Born in France, he plays for the Algeria national team.

== Club career ==
=== Lyon ===
A player of Lyon starting in 2013, Gouiri signed his first professional contract with the club on 3 July 2017 for three years. An internationally renowned prospect, Gouiri made the bench for Lyon in a Ligue 1 match against Bordeaux on 10 September 2016 at the age of 16, and debuted for the Lyon B team at the age of 17. He made his first team debut on 19 November 2017 in a 0–0 home draw against Montpellier in Ligue 1. He entered the field after 73 minutes replacing Tanguy Ndombele.

=== Nice ===
On 1 July 2020, Gouiri joined fellow Ligue 1 side Nice on a four-year contract for a fee of €7 million. On 23 August 2020, he scored two goals in his first competitive match for Nice, in a 2–1 league home win over newly promoted Lens, becoming the club's youngest player in the last 70 years to have scored at least twice in his club debut in the French top flight. On 29 October 2020, he scored the only goal in a 1–0 win over Hapoel Be'er Sheva in the 2020–21 UEFA Europa League.

=== Rennes ===
On 1 September 2022, Gouiri joined Rennes on a five-year contract until 30 June 2027.

=== Marseille ===
On 31 January 2025, Gouiri signed for Marseille for a reported transfer fee of €22 million, bonuses included. On 27 April, Gouiri scored a hat trick, including an overhead kick, as Marseille beat Brest 4–1 to reclaim second place in the league. He finished his first season with the club with 10 goals in 14 appearances.

== International career ==
Gouiri was born in France and is of Algerian descent, and holds dual-citizenship. He was a youth international for France, Gouiri was the top scorer at the 2017 UEFA European Under-17 Championship, scoring seven goals and was the top scorer in the tournament. After his success in the tournament, Gouiri garnered the attention of various European clubs and was rated one of the best young talents in the world by The Guardian.

Gouiri also represented France at the 2017 FIFA U-17 World Cup in India, scoring a brace in his debut in the tournament against the New Caledonia U17s. In total, he scored five goals in the tournament. At the 2018 UEFA U19 Euro, Gouiri scored two consecutive braces against Turkey and England, in the second and third matches of the group stage, respectively.

On 5 September 2023, Djamel Belmadi announced in the mixed zone that the change of sporting nationality for Gouiri from French to Algerian has been "resolved administratively". On 26 September 2023, Gouiri announced that he had fully committed to the Algeria national team. On 31 May 2026, Gouiri was named in Vladimir Petković's 26-man Algeria squad for the 2026 FIFA World Cup. On June 22, Gouiri scored for Algeria against Jordan in a World Cup pool game.

== Career statistics ==
=== Club ===
As of match played 8 November 2026

Appearances and goals by club, season and competition
Club	Season	League			Coupe de France		Coupe de la Ligue		Europe		Other		Total	
Club	Season	Division	Apps	Goals	Apps	Goals	Apps	Goals	Apps	Goals	Apps	Goals	Apps	Goals
Lyon	2017–18	Ligue 1	7	0	1	0	1	0	1 (Note: Appearance(s) in UEFA Europa League)	0	—		10	0
Lyon	2018–19	Ligue 1	0	0	0	0	0	0	0	0	—		0	0
Lyon	2019–20	Ligue 1	1	0	2	0	1	0	1 (Note: Appearance(s) in UEFA Champions League)	0	—		5	0
Lyon	Total		8	0	3	0	2	0	2	0	—		15	0
Nice	2020–21	Ligue 1	34	12	2	0	—		5	4	—		41	16
Nice	2021–22	Ligue 1	38	10	5	2	—		—		—		43	12
Nice	2022–23	Ligue 1	3	0	0	0	—		2 (Note: Appearances in UEFA Europa Conference League)	0	—		5	0
Nice	Total		75	22	7	2	—		7	4	—		89	28
Rennes	2022–23	Ligue 1	33	15	2	0	—		7	2	—		42	17
Rennes	2023–24	Ligue 1	31	7	3	2	—		7	2	—		41	11
Rennes	2024–25	Ligue 1	19	3	1	0	—		—		—		20	3
Rennes	Total		83	25	6	2	—		14	4	—		103	31
Marseille	2024–25	Ligue 1	14	10	—		—		—		—		14	10
Marseille	2025–26	Ligue 1	22	8	2	3	—		3	0	1 (Note: Appearance in Trophée des Champions)	0	28	11
Marseille	2026–27	Ligue 1	10	7	0	0	—		4	1	—		14	8
Marseille	Total		46	25	2	3	—		7	1	1	0	56	29
Career total			212	72	18	7	2	0	30	9	1	0	263	88

=== International ===
As of match played 2 July 2026

Appearances and goals by national team and year
National team	Year	Apps	Goals
Algeria	2023	4	0
Algeria	2024	8	5
Algeria	2025	7	1
Algeria	2026	8	5
Total		27	11

As of match played 22 June 2026
Algeria score listed first, score column indicates score after each Gouiri goal.

List of international goals scored by Amine Gouiri
No.	Date	Venue	Cap	Opponent	Score	Result	Competition
1	22 March 2024	Nelson Mandela Stadium, Algiers, Algeria	5	Bolivia	1–0	3–2	2024 FIFA Series
2	5 September 2024	Miloud Hadefi Stadium, Oran, Algeria	7	Equatorial Guinea	2–0	2–0	2025 Africa Cup of Nations qualification
3	10 September 2024	Samuel Kanyon Doe Sports Complex, Paynesville, Liberia	8	Liberia	1–0	3–0	2025 Africa Cup of Nations qualification
4	10 October 2024	19 May 1956 Stadium, Annaba, Algeria	9	Togo	4–1	5–1	2025 Africa Cup of Nations qualification
5	17 November 2024	Hocine Aït Ahmed Stadium, Tizi Ouzou, Algeria	12	Liberia	4–1	5–1	2025 Africa Cup of Nations qualification
6	21 March 2025	Obed Itani Chilume Stadium, Francistown, Botswana	13	Botswana	1–0	3–1	2026 FIFA World Cup qualification
7	27 March 2026	Stadio Luigi Ferraris, Genoa, Italy	20	Guatemala	1–0	7–0	Friendly
8	27 March 2026	Stadio Luigi Ferraris, Genoa, Italy	20	Guatemala	5–0	7–0	Friendly
9	10 June 2026	Rock Chalk Park, Lawrence, United States	23	Bolivia	2–0	4–0	Friendly
10	10 June 2026	Rock Chalk Park, Lawrence, United States	23	Bolivia	3–0	4–0	Friendly
11	22 June 2026	Levi's Stadium, Santa Clara, United States	25	Jordan	2–1	2–1	2026 FIFA World Cup

== Honours ==
Lyon

- Coupe de la Ligue runner-up: 2019–20

Nice

- Coupe de France runner-up: 2021–22

Individual

- UEFA European Under-17 Championship top scorer: 2017
- UEFA European Under-17 Championship Team of the Tournament: 2017
- UNFP Ligue 1 Player of the Month: February 2025
- Ligue 1 Goal of the Year: 2024–25
