= Jordan Lotomba =

Swiss footballer (born 1998)

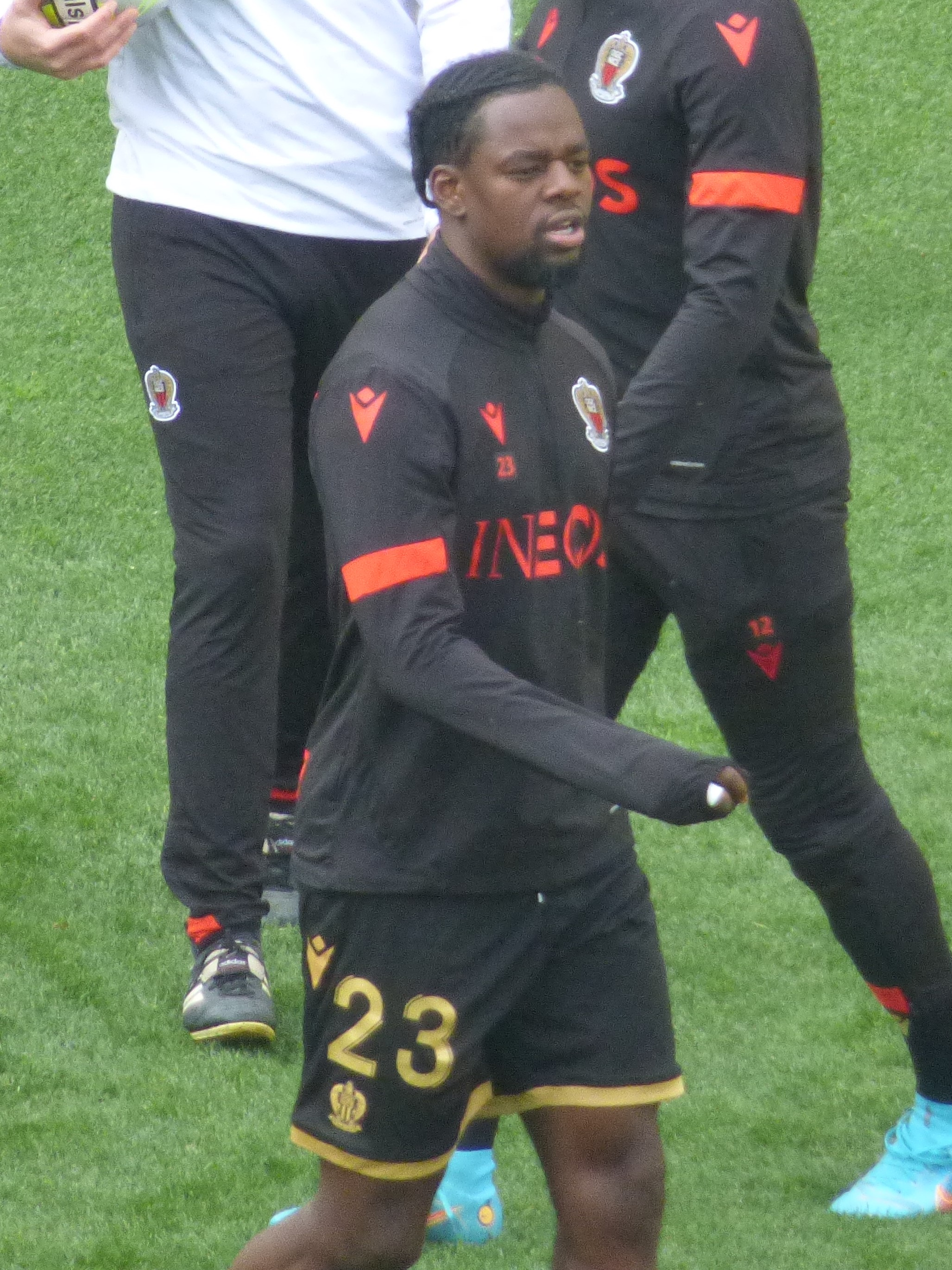
- Lotomba with Nice in 2022

Personal information
- Full name: Mvula Jordan Lotomba
- Date of birth: 29 September 1998 (age 28)
- Place of birth: Yverdon-les-Bains, Switzerland
- Height: 1.77 m (5 ft 10 in)
- Position: Right-back

Team information
- Current team: Celtic
- Number: 3

Youth career
- 2005–2008: Champagne Sports
- 2008–2013: Yverdon-Sport
- 2013–2016: Lausanne-Sport

Senior career*
Years	Team	Apps	(Gls)
2016–2017	Lausanne-Sport	41	(0)
2017–2020	Young Boys	54	(0)
2020–2024	Nice	123	(2)
2024–2026	Feyenoord	27	(1)
2026–	Celtic	0	(0)

International career^{‡}
2017–2019	Switzerland U21	9	(0)
2020–	Switzerland	8	(1)
- * Club domestic league appearances and goals as of 16:25, 16 August 2026 (UTC) ‡ National team caps and goals as of 15 October 2023 (UTC)

Mvula Jordan Lotomba (born 29 September 1998) is a Swiss professional footballer who plays as a right-back for Scottish Premiership club Celtic and the Switzerland national team.

== Club career ==
=== Lausanne-Sport ===
Lotomba was trained in the Lausanne-Sport academy. He made his Swiss Super League debut on 24 July 2016 against Grasshopper Club Zürich.

=== Young Boys ===
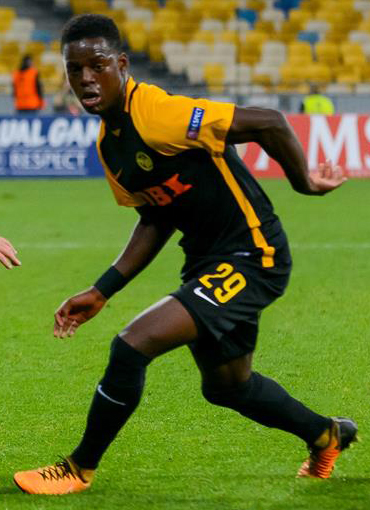
Lotomba with Young Boys in 2017

Having joined Young Boys in the summer of 2017, he scored a 90th-minute goal that sealed a 2–0 victory against Dynamo Kyiv in the Champions League third qualifying round, which qualified his club to the play-offs on away goals.

He was part of the Young Boys squad that won the 2017–18 Swiss Super League, their first league title for 32 years. During the 2019–20 season, Lotomba became a key member of the squad, making 35 appearances for the club as they won a third successive Super League title.

=== Nice ===
On 3 August 2020, Lotomba signed for Ligue 1 side Nice for €7 million. Later that year, on 23 December, he scored his first goal in a 2–2 draw against Lorient. On 19 May 2024, he scored his second Ligue 1 goal on the final matchday of the 2023–24 season in the stoppage time of a 2–2 away draw against Lille.

=== Feyenoord ===
On 2 September 2024, Lotomba joined Dutch club Feyenoord on a three-year contract.

=== Celtic ===
On 2 September 2026, Lotomba signed for Scottish Premiership club Celtic for an undisclosed fee on a one-year deal.

== International career ==
Lotomba made his Switzerland national team debut on 7 October 2020 in a friendly against Croatia.

On 2 June 2021, he was included in the final 26-man squad for the rescheduled UEFA Euro 2020 tournament.

== Personal life ==
Lotomba was born in Switzerland, and is of DR Congolese descent through his father and of Angolan descent through his mother.

== Career statistics ==
=== Club ===
As of match played 16 August 2026

Appearances and goals by club, season and competition
Club	Season	League			National cup		Continental		Other		Total	
Club	Season	Division	Apps	Goals	Apps	Goals	Apps	Goals	Apps	Goals	Apps	Goals
Young Boys	2017–18	Swiss Super League	22	0	5	0	6 (Note: Three appearances and one goal in UEFA Champions League, three appearances in UEFA Europa League)	1	–		33	1
Young Boys	2018–19	Swiss Super League	5	0	0	0	–		–		5	0
Young Boys	2019–20	Swiss Super League	27	0	2	0	6 (Note: Two appearances in UEFA Champions League, four appearances in UEFA Europa League)	0	–		35	0
Young Boys	Total		54	0	7	0	12	1	0	0	73	1
Nice	2020–21	Ligue 1	30	1	1	0	5 (Note: Appearances in UEFA Europa League)	0	–		36	1
Nice	2021–22	Ligue 1	30	0	4	0	–		–		34	0
Nice	2022–23	Ligue 1	33	0	0	0	7 (Note: Appearances in UEFA Europa Conference League)	0	–		40	0
Nice	2023–24	Ligue 1	28	1	2	1	–		–		30	2
Nice	2024–25	Ligue 1	2	0	0	0	0	0	–		2	0
Nice	Total		123	2	7	1	12	0	0	0	142	3
Feyenoord	2024–25	Eredivisie	6	1	0	0	5 (Note: Appearances in UEFA Champions League)	0	–		11	1
Feyenoord	2025–26	Eredivisie	20	0	1	0	7 (Note: Two appearances in UEFA Champions League, five appearances in UEFA Europa League)	0	–		28	0
Feyenoord	2026–27	Eredivisie	1	0	0	0	0	0	–		1	0
Feyenoord	Total		27	1	1	0	12	0	–		40	1
Career total			204	3	15	1	36	1	0	0	255	5

=== International ===
As of match played 15 October 2023

Appearances and goals by national team and year
National team	Year	Apps	Goals
Switzerland	2020	1	0
Switzerland	2021	3	0
Switzerland	2022	3	1
Switzerland	2023	1	0
Total		8	1

Scores and results list Switzerland's goal tally first.

No	Date	Venue	Opponent	Score	Result	Competition
1.	29 March 2022	Letzigrund, Zürich, Switzerland	Kosovo	1–1	1–1	Friendly match

== Honours ==
Young Boys

- Swiss Super League: 2017–18, 2018–19, 2019–20

Nice

- Coupe de France runner-up: 2021–22

Individual

- Swiss Super League Team of the Year: 2017–18
