= Théo Pionnier =

French footballer (born 2002)

Personal information
- Full name: Théo Pionnier-Bertrand
- Date of birth: 21 January 2002 (age 24)
- Place of birth: Gap, France
- Height: 1.83 m (6 ft 0 in)
- Position: Defender

Team information
- Current team: Quevilly-Rouen
- Number: 27

Youth career
- 2011–2017: Gap
- 2017–2019: Nice

Senior career*
Years	Team	Apps	(Gls)
2019–2022	Nice II	24	(0)
2020	Nice	0	(0)
2022–2024	Quevilly-Rouen II	38	(0)
2022–	Quevilly-Rouen	39	(2)
- * Club domestic league appearances and goals as of 23 June 2026

Théo Pionnier-Bertrand (born 21 January 2002) is a French professional footballer who plays as a defender for Ligue 3 club Quevilly-Rouen.

== Career ==
Pionnier made his professional debut with Nice in a 1–0 UEFA Europa League loss to Hapoel Be'er Sheva on 10 December 2020.

He made his Ligue 2 debut for Quevilly-Rouen on 2 June 2023 against Niort.
