= Stanley Nsoki =

French footballer (born 1999)

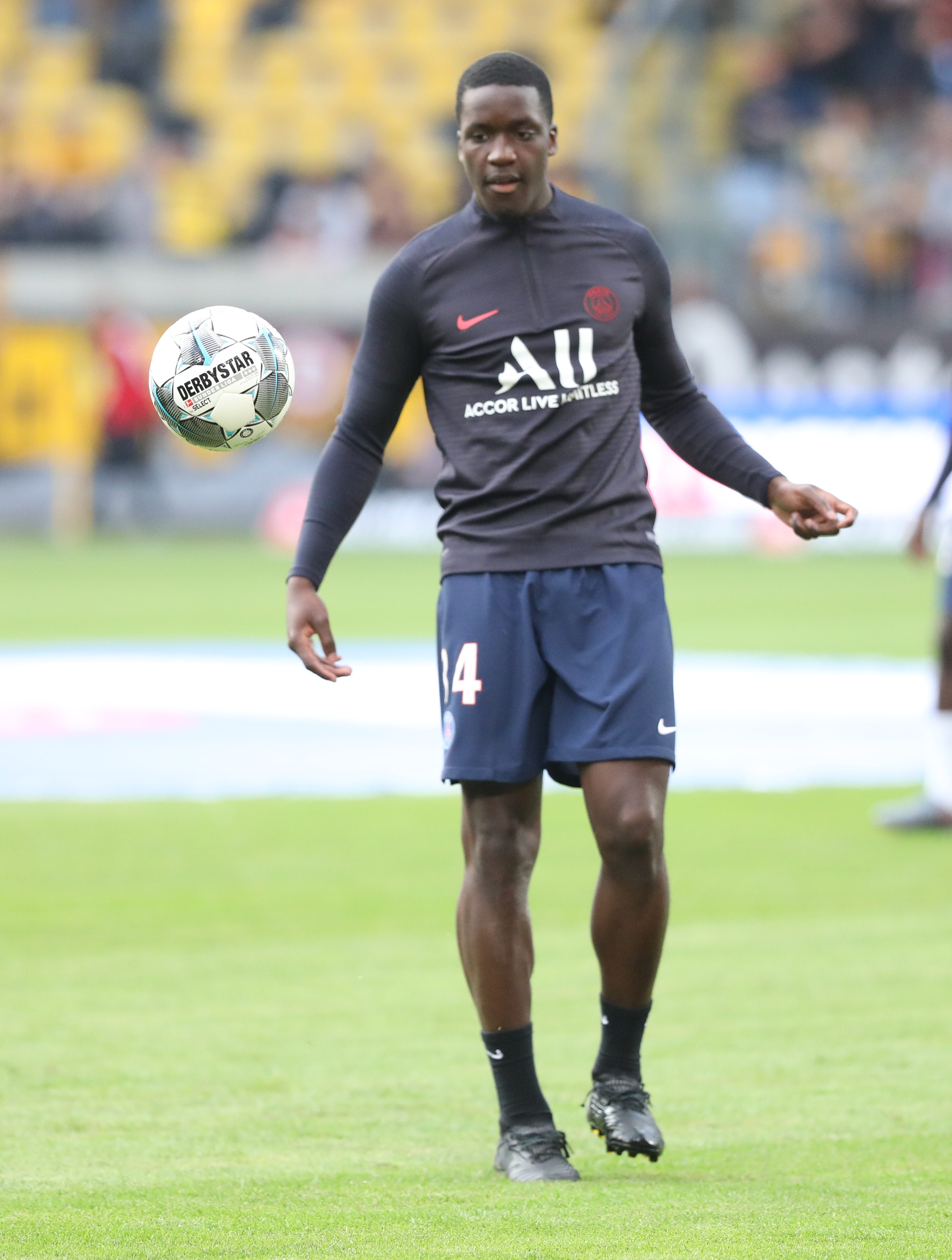
- Nsoki with Paris Saint-Germain in 2019

Personal information
- Full name: Stanley Pierre Nsoki
- Date of birth: 9 April 1999 (age 27)
- Place of birth: Poissy, France
- Height: 1.84 m (6 ft 0 in)
- Position: Defender

Team information
- Current team: Union Berlin
- Number: 34

Youth career
- 2007–2014: US Roissy-en-Brie
- 2014–2017: Paris Saint-Germain

Senior career*
Years	Team	Apps	(Gls)
2017–2019	Paris Saint-Germain B	13	(0)
2017–2019	Paris Saint-Germain	13	(0)
2019–2021	Nice	35	(0)
2021–2022	Club Brugge	33	(0)
2022–2026	TSG Hoffenheim	52	(1)
2025–2026	→ Union Berlin (loan)	13	(1)
2026–	Union Berlin	0	(0)

International career^{‡}
2015	France U16	5	(0)
2015	France U17	3	(0)
2017	France U19	3	(0)
2017	France U20	1	(0)
2018	France U21	1	(0)
- * Club domestic league appearances and goals as of 2 May 2026 (UTC) ‡ National team caps and goals as of 15 November 2018

Stanley Pierre Nsoki (born 9 April 1999) is a French professional footballer who plays as a defender for Bundesliga club Union Berlin.

== Club career ==
=== Paris Saint-Germain ===
Nsoki developed through the Paris Saint-Germain academy. He made his Ligue 1 debut on 20 December 2017 in a match against Caen. He came on for Marquinhos in the 65th minute of a 3–0 home win.

=== Nice ===
On 31 August 2019, Nsoki joined Nice in a transfer worth €12.5 million.

=== Club Brugge ===
Nsoki joined Belgian champions Club Brugge on 24 July 2021, signing a multi-year deal. He made his debut for the club on 1 August, in a 1–0 league victory over Union SG.

=== TSG Hoffenheim ===
On 4 August 2022, Nsoki joined Bundesliga team TSG Hoffenheim.

=== Union Berlin ===
On 24 July 2025, Nsoki was loaned by Union Berlin, also in the Bundesliga. On 1 July 2026, Nsoki returned to Union Berlin on a permanent basis.

== International career ==
Nsoki was born in France and is of Congolese descent. Nsoki is a youth international for France.

== Personal life ==
Nsoki's cousin Noah Nsoki is also a footballer who came through the Paris Saint-Germain Youth Academy.

== Career statistics ==
As of 2 May 2026

Club	Season	League			National Cup		League Cup		Europe		Other		Total	
Club	Season	Division	Apps	Goals	Apps	Goals	Apps	Goals	Apps	Goals	Apps	Goals	Apps	Goals
Paris Saint-Germain	2017–18	Ligue 1	1	0	0	0	0	0	0	0	0	0	1	0
Paris Saint-Germain	2018–19	Ligue 1	12	0	2	0	0	0	0	0	1	0	15	0
Paris Saint-Germain	Total		13	0	2	0	0	0	0	0	1	0	16	0
Nice	2019–20	Ligue 1	17	0	3	0	0	0	0	0	—		20	0
Nice	2020–21	Ligue 1	18	0	2	0	—		4 (Note: Appearances in UEFA Europa League)	0	—		24	0
Nice	Total		35	0	5	0	0	0	4	0	0	0	44	0
Club Brugge	2021–22	Belgian First Division A	31	0	3	0	—		6 (Note: Appearances in UEFA Champions League)	0	—		40	0
Club Brugge	2022–23	Belgian First Division A	2	0	0	0	—		0	0	—		2	0
Club Brugge	Total		33	0	3	0	—		6	0	—		42	0
1899 Hoffenheim	2022–23	Bundesliga	19	1	2	0	—		—		—		21	1
1899 Hoffenheim	2023–24	Bundesliga	11	0	0	0	—		—		—		11	0
1899 Hoffenheim	2024–25	Bundesliga	21	0	0	0	—		5	0	—		26	0
1899 Hoffenheim	Total		51	1	2	0	—		5	0	—		58	1
Union Berlin (loan)	2025–26	Bundesliga	13	1	0	0	—		—		—		13	1
Union Berlin	2026–27	Bundesliga	0	0	0	0	—		—		—		0	0
Career total			145	2	12	0	4	0	11	0	1	0	173	2

== Honours ==
Paris Saint-Germain

- Ligue 1: 2017–18, 2018–19
- Coupe de France: 2017–18; runner-up: 2018–19
- Coupe de la Ligue: 2017–18
- Trophée des Champions: 2018
