= Alexis Trouillet =

French footballer (born 2000)

Personal information
- Date of birth: 23 December 2000 (age 25)
- Place of birth: Saint-Priest-en-Jarez, France
- Height: 1.75 m (5 ft 9 in)
- Position: Midfielder

Team information
- Current team: Standard Liège
- Number: 26

Youth career
- 2008–2017: Rennes

Senior career*
Years	Team	Apps	(Gls)
2017–2020	Rennes B	26	(1)
2020	Nice B	1	(0)
2020–2022	Nice	5	(0)
2021–2022	→ Auxerre (loan)	26	(0)
2022–2025	Panathinaikos	1	(0)
2023–2024	→ Volos (loan)	24	(1)
2025–2026	Rodez	32	(0)
2026–	Standard Liège	0	(0)

International career
2017–2018	France U18	5	(0)
- * Club domestic league appearances and goals as of 11 May 2026

Alexis Trouillet (born 23 December 2000) is a French professional footballer who plays as a midfielder for Belgian Pro League club Standard Liège.

== Career ==
A youth product of Rennes, Trouillet joined OGC Nice on 31 January 2020. He made his professional debut with Nice in a Ligue 1 match against Strasbourg on 29 August 2020.

On 30 August 2021, he moved to Auxerre on a season-long loan.

=== Panathinaikos ===
On 15 September 2022, Panathinaikos officially announced the signing of Trouillet until the summer of 2025. In his first game with the club, he suffered a cruciate ligament rupture, which ruled him out for the remainder of the season.

==== Loan to Volos ====
On 17 July 2023, he joined Volos on a season-long loan.

=== Rodez ===
On 3 February 2025, I liga club Wisła Kraków announced Trouillet would undergo a medical ahead of his move to the Polish side. However, hours later, he joined Ligue 2 club Rodez on a two-and-a-half-year deal.

=== Standard Liège ===
On 11 July 2026, Trouillet moved to Belgium and signed a contract with Standard Liège for two seasons, with an option for a third season.

== Career statistics ==
=== Club ===
As of match played on 27 April 2024

Appearances and goals by club, season and competition
Club	Season	League			National cup (Note: Includes Coupe de France, Greek Football Cup)		Europe		Total	
Club	Season	Division	Apps	Goals	Apps	Goals	Apps	Goals	Apps	Goals
Rennes B	2017–18	National 2	7	0	—		—		7	0
Rennes B	2018–19	National 3	10	1	—		—		10	1
Rennes B	2019–20	National 3	9	0	—		—		9	0
Rennes B	Total		26	1	—		—		26	1
Nice B	2019–20	National 3	1	0	—		—		1	0
Nice	2020–21	Ligue 1	5	0	1	0	2 (Note: Appearances in UEFA Europa League)	0	8	0
Auxerre (loan)	2021–22	Ligue 2	26	0	2	1	—		28	1
Panathinaikos	2022–23	Super League Greece	1	0	0	0	—		1	0
Panathinaikos	2024–25	Super League Greece	0	0	0	0	0	0	0	0
Panathinaikos	Total		1	0	0	0	0	0	1	0
Volos (loan)	2023–24	Super League Greece	24	1	2	0	—		26	1
Career total			83	2	5	1	2	0	90	3
