= Malik Sellouki =

French footballer (born 2000)

Personal information
- Date of birth: 21 March 2000 (age 26)
- Place of birth: Nice, France
- Height: 1.77 m (5 ft 10 in)
- Positions: Attacking midfielder; winger

Team information
- Current team: Rio Ave
- Number: 19

Youth career
- ESS Nice Nord
- Cavigal Nice
- Cannes
- Monaco
- –2019: Cannes

Senior career*
Years	Team	Apps	(Gls)
2019–2020	Cannes	14	(0)
2020	Nice II	6	(5)
2021	Nice	4	(1)
2021–2022	Maribor	16	(0)
2022–2024	ADO Den Haag	29	(7)
2024–2026	Laval	64	(15)
2026–	Rio Ave	2	(0)
- * Club domestic league appearances and goals as of 6 September 2026

Malik Sellouki (born 21 March 2000) is a French professional footballer who plays as a midfielder for Primeira Liga club Rio Ave.

== Career ==
Sellouki began his career with the amateur side Cannes, and signed with Nice on 26 August 2020. He made his professional debut with Nice in a 3–2 Ligue 1 defeat to Marseille on 17 February 2021, scoring his side's second goal in the 87th minute.

On 25 August 2021, Sellouki signed a two-year contract with Slovenian side Maribor. After making 17 appearances in all competitions during the 2021–22 season, he terminated his contract in July 2022 and joined Eerste Divisie side ADO Den Haag on a two-year deal.

On 2 August 2024, Sellouki signed a three-year contract with Laval in Ligue 2.

On 26 August 2026, Sellouki moved to Rio Ave in Portugal on a three-season deal.

== Personal life ==
Born in France, Sellouki is of Moroccan descent.

== Career statistics ==
As of match played 25 May 2024

Appearances and goals by club, season and competition
Club	Season	League			National cup		Continental		Total	
Club	Season	Division	Apps	Goals	Apps	Goals	Apps	Goals	Apps	Goals
Cannes	2018–19	Championnat National 3	1	0	—		—		1	0
Cannes	2019–20	Championnat National 3	13	0	—		—		13	0
Cannes	Total		14	0	—		—		14	0
Nice II	2020–21	Championnat National 3	6	5	—		—		6	5
Nice	2020–21	Ligue 1	4	1	0	0	0	0	4	1
Maribor	2021–22	Slovenian PrvaLiga	16	0	1	1	—		17	1
ADO Den Haag	2022–23	Eerste Divisie	11	2	2	2	—		13	4
ADO Den Haag	2023–24	Eerste Divisie	18	5	2	0	3 (Note: Appearances in Eredivisie promotion play-offs)	0	23	5
ADO Den Haag	Total		29	7	4	2	3	0	36	9
Career total			69	13	5	3	3	0	77	16
