= Trazié Thomas =

Ivorian footballer

Personal information
- Full name: Trazié Thomas Zai
- Date of birth: 1 July 1999 (age 27)
- Place of birth: Divo, Ivory Coast
- Height: 1.72 m (5 ft 8 in)
- Position: Midfielder

Team information
- Current team: Hapoel Ramat Gan

Senior career*
Years	Team	Apps	(Gls)
2018–2020	RC Abidjan	56	(1)
2020–2021	Nice	0	(0)
2020–2021	→ Lausanne-Sport (loan)	13	(0)
2021–2022	Lausanne-Sport	20	(0)
2022–2024	Beitar Jerusalem	34	(4)
2024	→ Kasımpaşa (loan)	7	(0)
2024–2025	Bordeaux	23	(1)
2025–	Hapoel Ramat Gan	0	(0)

International career^{‡}
2017	Ivory Coast U20	4	(0)
- * Club domestic league appearances and goals as of 30 October 2024 ‡ National team caps and goals as of 20 February 2021

Trazié Thomas Zai (born 1 July 1999) is an Ivorian professional footballer who plays as a midfielder for Championnat National 1 club Bordeaux

== Club career ==
Thomas began his career with RC Abidjan in Ivory Coast. In September 2020, he signed for Nice in France before joining Lausanne-Sport on loan for the 2020–21 season. He made his professional debut with the club in a 4–0 Swiss Super League loss to Zürich on 6 December 2020. At the end of the season, Lausanne-Sport signed Thomas on a permanent basis.

In October 2024, Thomas joined Championnat National 2 club Bordeaux on a contract until the end of the season.

== International career ==
Thomas represented the Ivory Coast U20s at the 2017 Toulon Tournament.
