= Germany national football team records and statistics =

Records and statistics by the Germany national football team

The Germany national football team (German: Deutsche Fußballnationalmannschaft or Die Mannschaft) has represented Germany in men's international football since 1908. The team is governed by the German Football Association (Deutscher Fußball-Bund), founded in 1900. Ever since the DFB was reinaugurated in 1949 the team has represented the Federal Republic of Germany. Under Allied occupation and division, two other separate national teams were also recognised by FIFA: the Saarland team representing the Saarland (1950–1956) and the East German team representing the German Democratic Republic (1952–1990). Both have been absorbed along with their records by the current national team. The official name and code "Germany FR (FRG)" was shortened to "Germany (GER)" following the reunification in 1990.

Germany is one of the most successful national teams in international competitions, having won four World Cups (1954, 1974, 1990, 2014), three European Championships (1972, 1980, 1996), and one Confederations Cup (2017). They have also been runners-up three times in the European Championship, four times in the World Cup, and have a further four third-place finishes at the World Cup. East Germany won Olympic Gold in 1976.

Germany is one of only two nations to have won both the FIFA World Cup and the FIFA Women's World Cup. At the end of the 2014 World Cup, Germany earned the highest Elo rating of any national football team in history, with a record 2,205 points. Germany is also the only European nation that has won a FIFA World Cup in the Americas.

== Abbreviations ==
- A = away match
- H = home match
- * = match in neutral place
- (c) = captain of team
- (g) = goalkeeper
- Am. = Amateur
- WC = World Cup
- EC = European Championship
- Confed-Cup = Confederations Cup
- NL = Nations League
- OG = Olympic Games
- CT = Consolation tournament of the Olympic Games
- GS = Group stage
- 2GS = Second group stage
- R16 = Round of 16
- QF = Quarter-finals
- SF = Semi-finals
- F = Final
- a.e.t. = after extra time
- p. = penalty shoot-out
- GG = golden goal
- (penalty scored) = goal scored from penalty kick
- (o.g.) = own goal
- (opposite the name) = players which played for Austria and Germany
- (opposite the name) = players which played for Poland and Germany
- green background colour = Germany won the match
- yellow background colour = draw (including matches decided via penalty shoot-out)
- red background colour = Germany lost the match
- The current and enlarged national team members are highlighted in bold. Players who have not been played for more than six months are in italics.

== Player records ==
=== Most appearances ===
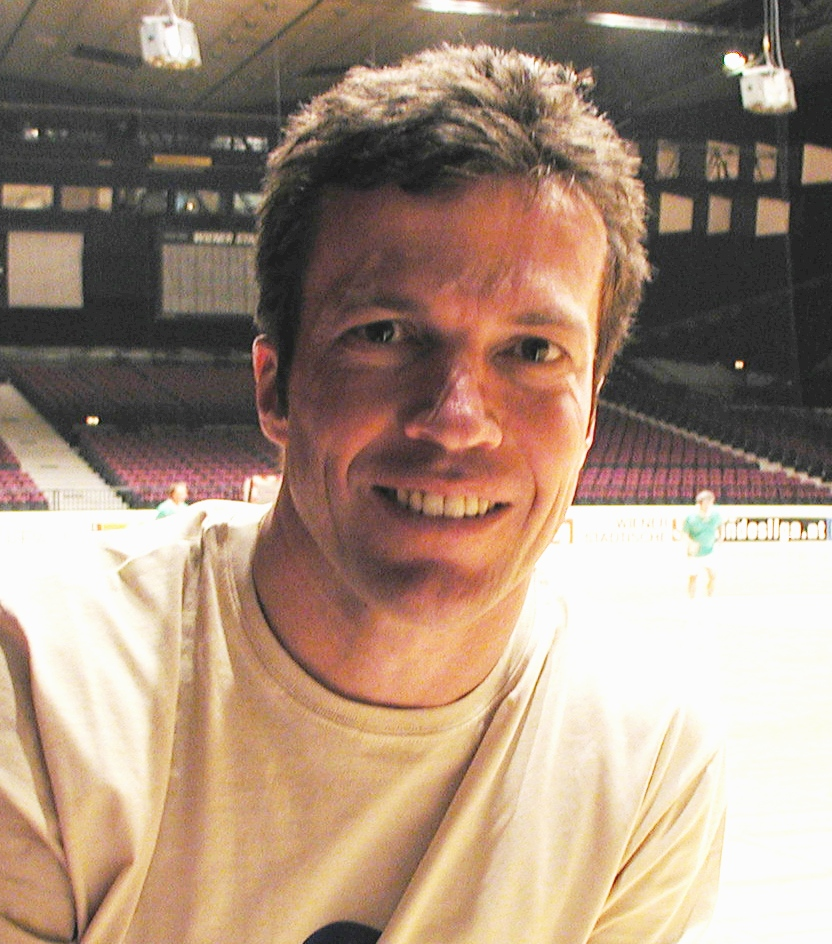
Lothar Matthäus is Germany's most capped player, with 150 appearances.

As of 29 June 2026

| Rank | Player | Caps | Goals | Period |
|---|---|---|---|---|
| 1 | Lothar Matthäus | 150 | 23 | 1980–2000 |
| 2 | Miroslav Klose | 137 | 71 | 2001–2014 |
| 3 | Thomas Müller | 131 | 45 | 2010–2024 |
| 4 | Lukas Podolski | 130 | 49 | 2004–2017 |
| 5 | Manuel Neuer | 128 | 0 | 2009–2026 |
| 6 | Bastian Schweinsteiger | 121 | 24 | 2004–2016 |
| 7 | Toni Kroos | 114 | 17 | 2010–2024 |
| 8 | Philipp Lahm | 113 | 5 | 2004–2014 |
| 9 | Joshua Kimmich | 114 | 10 | 2016–present |
| 10 | Jürgen Klinsmann | 108 | 47 | 1987–1998 |

=== Most consecutive matches ===
Since many players have been absent due to injuries, there are only a few players who have been able to play for the national team without interruption:

| Rank | Player | Matches | Period |
|---|---|---|---|
| 1 | Franz Beckenbauer | 60 | 9 September 1970 – 23 February 1977 |
| 2 | Berti Vogts | 48 | 27 March 1974 – 21 June 1978 |
| 3 | Manfred Kaltz | 47 | 8 March 1978 – 14 April 1982 |
| 4 | Berti Vogts | 39 | 6 March 1968 – 8 September 1971 |

=== Youngest players on debut ===
Twelve players were younger than 19 on their debut, four under 18. 109 players were not yet of age on their debut. After the age of majority was reduced to 18 years on 1 January 1975, no players who were not yet of age have made their debut, with the exception of Youssoufa Moukoko in 2022, who debuted four days before his 18th birthday. Of the players who were not yet of age on their debut, only Franz Beckenbauer managed more than 100 internationals, but other players later became World and / or European Champions, who were not yet of age on their debut: Rainer Bonhof, Paul Breitner, Horst Eckel, Uli Hoeneß, Gerd Mueller, Wolfgang Overath, Berti Vogts, Fritz Walter. Besides Beckenbauer, Willy Baumgärtner, Paul Janes and Uwe Seeler later became record appearances.

The ten youngest players on debut are listed.

| Rank | Player | Date of birth | First match | Opponent | Result | Competition | Age | Apps | Pos. |
|---|---|---|---|---|---|---|---|---|---|
| 1. | Willy Baumgärtner | 23 December 1890 | 5 April 1908 | Switzerland | 3–5 | Friendly match | 17 years, 104 days | 4 | FW |
| 2. | Marius Hiller | 5 August 1892 | 3 April 1910 | Switzerland | 3–2 | Friendly match | 17 years, 241 days | 3 (Note: Hiller also played 2 matches for Argentina at the age of 24) | FW |
| 3. | Uwe Seeler | 5 November 1936 | 16 October 1954 | France | 1–3 | Friendly match | 17 years, 345 days | 72 | FW |
| 4. | Youssoufa Moukoko | 20 November 2004 | 16 November 2022 | Oman | 1–0 | Friendly match | 17 years, 361 days | 2 | FW |
| 5. | Jamal Musiala | 26 February 2003 | 25 March 2021 | Iceland | 3–0 | WC 2022 qualifier | 18 years, 27 days | 40 | MF |
| 6. | Lennart Karl | 22 February 2008 | 27 March 2026 | Switzerland | 2–3 | Friendly match | 18 years, 33 days | 1 | MF |
| 7. | Karl Wolter | 2 August 1894 | 6 October 1912 | Denmark | 1–3 | Friendly match | 18 years, 65 days | 3 | FW |
| 8. | Franz Jelinek | 10 July 1922 | 15 September 1940 | Slovakia | 1–0 | Friendly match | 18 years, 67 days | 1 | FW |
| 9. | Florian Wirtz | 3 May 2003 | 2 September 2021 | Liechtenstein | 2–0 | WC 2022 qualifier | 18 years, 122 days | 37 | MF |
| 10. | Mario Götze | 3 June 1992 | 17 November 2010 | Sweden | 0–0 | Friendly match | 18 years, 167 days | 66 | MF |

=== Oldest players ===
Eighteen players played their last match for Germany at an age older than 35 years, including six GKs. Eight national players continued to play for Austria or the Saarland after the Second World War. The ten oldest players at their last match are listed.

| Rank | Player | Date of birth | Last match | Opponent | Result | Competition | Age | Apps | Pos. |
|---|---|---|---|---|---|---|---|---|---|
| 1. | Manuel Neuer | 27 March 1986 | 14 June 2026 | Ivory Coast | 1–2 | WC 2026 group stage | 40 years, 79 days | 125 | GK |
| 2. | Lothar Matthäus | 21 March 1961 | 20 June 2000 | Portugal | 0–3 | EC 2000 group stage | 39 years, 91 days | 150 | DF |
| 3. | Jens Lehmann | 10 November 1969 | 29 June 2008 | Spain | 0–1 | EC 2008 final | 38 years, 232 days | 61 | GK |
| 4. | Fritz Walter | 31 October 1920 | 24 June 1958 | Sweden | 1–3 | WC 1958 semi-final | 37 years, 236 days | 61 | MF |
| 5. | Oliver Kahn | 15 June 1969 | 8 July 2006 | Portugal | 3–1 | WC 2006 3rd place | 37 years, 23 days | 86 | GK |
| 6. | Richard Kress | 6 March 1925 | 22 October 1961 | Greece | 2–1 | WC 1962 qualifier | 36 years, 230 days | 9 | FW |
| 7. | Andreas Kupfer | 7 May 1914 | 22 November 1950 | Switzerland | 1–0 | Friendly match | 36 years, 199 days | 44 | DF |
| 8. | Andreas Köpke | 12 March 1962 | 4 July 1998 | Croatia | 0–3 | WC 1998 quarter-final | 36 years, 114 days | 59 | GK |
| 9. | Hans-Jörg Butt | 28 May 1974 | 10 July 2010 | Uruguay | 3–2 | WC 2010 3rd place | 36 years, 43 days | 4 | GK |
| 10. | Miroslav Klose | 9 June 1978 | 13 July 2014 | Argentina | 1–0 | WC 2014 final | 36 years, 34 days | 137 | FW |

=== Oldest players on debut ===
39 players were at least 30 years old on their debut; for 16 of them it was their only match. Stefan Kuntz, who had made his debut at the age of 31 years and 49 days, made the most appearances (25). The ten oldest players on debut are listed.

| Rank | Player | Date of birth | First match | Opponent | Result | Competition | Age | Apps |
|---|---|---|---|---|---|---|---|---|
| 1. | Karl Sesta | 18 March 1906 | 15 June 1941 | Croatia | 5–1 | Friendly match | 35 years, 89 days | 3 (Note: Sesta previously played 42 matches for Austria; on his debut for the side he was 26 years and 65 days old.) |
| 2. | Matthias Mauritz | 13 November 1924 | 20 May 1959 | Poland | 1–1 | Friendly match | 34 years, 188 days | 1 |
| 3. | Oliver Baumann | 2 June 1990 | 14 October 2024 | Netherlands | 1–0 | 2024–25 NL | 34 years, 134 days | 10 |
| 4. | Karl Tewes | 18 August 1886 | 26 September 1920 | Austria | 2–3 | Friendly match | 34 years, 39 days | 6 |
| 5. | Martin Max | 7 August 1968 | 17 April 2002 | Argentina | 0–1 | Friendly match | 33 years, 253 days | 1 |
| 6. | Paul Steiner | 23 January 1957 | 30 May 1990 | Denmark | 1–0 | Friendly match | 33 years, 127 days | 1 |
| 7. | Roman Weidenfeller | 6 August 1980 | 19 November 2013 | England | 1–0 | Friendly match | 33 years, 105 days | 5 |
| 8. | Rudolf Leip | 8 June 1890 | 12 August 1923 | Finland | 1–2 | Friendly match | 33 years, 65 days | 3 |
| 9. | Kurt Borkenhagen | 30 December 1919 | 5 October 1952 | France | 1–3 | Friendly match | 32 years, 280 days | 1 |
| 10. | Kevin Behrens | 3 February 1991 | 17 October 2023 | Mexico | 2–2 | Friendly match | 32 years, 257 days | 1 |

=== Youngest captains ===
Of the ten youngest captains, only Joshua Kimmich was captain in a competitive match, playing against Cameroon in the 2017 FIFA Confederations Cup group stage; the other thirteen youngest captains were only in friendly matches.

| Rank | Player | Date of birth | First match as captain | Opponent | Result | Competition | Age | App No. | Capt apps | Apps |
|---|---|---|---|---|---|---|---|---|---|---|
| 1. | Julian Draxler | 20 September 1993 | 13 May 2014 | Poland | 0–0 | Friendly match | 20 years, 235 days | 11. | 9 | 58 |
| 2. | Christian Schmidt | 9 June 1888 | 24 April 1910 | Netherlands | 2–4 | Friendly match | 21 years, 299 days | 1. | 1 | 3 |
| 3. | Josef Glaser | 11 May 1887 | 13 March 1909 | England (Am.) | 0–9 | Friendly match | 21 years, 310 days | 1. | 4 | 5 |
| 4. | Max Breunig | 12 November 1888 | 26 March 1911 | Switzerland | 6–2 | Friendly match | 22 years, 133 days | 2. | 3 | 9 |
| 5. | Joshua Kimmich | 8 February 1995 | 25 June 2017 (from 80') | Cameroon | 3–1 | Confed-Cup 2017 | 22 years, 137 days | 18. | 23 | 106 |
| 6. | Adolf Jäger | 31 March 1889 | 14 April 1912 | Hungary | 4–4 | Friendly match | 23 years, 14 days | 4. | 10 | 18 |
| 7. | Stanislaus Kobierski | 13 November 1910 | 3 December 1933 | Poland | 1–0 | Friendly match | 23 years, 20 days | 11. | 1 | 26 |
| 8. | Eugen Kipp | 26 February 1885 | 7 June 1908 | Austria | 2–3 | Friendly match | 23 years, 101 days | 2. | 2 | 18 |
| 9. | Serdar Tasci | 24 April 1987 | 11 August 2010 (from 66') | Denmark | 2–2 | Friendly match | 23 years, 109 days | 14. | 1 | 14 |
| 10. | Ernst Blum | 25 January 1904 | 2 October 1927 | Denmark | 1–3 | Friendly match | 23 years, 250 days | 1. | 1 | 1 |

=== Oldest captains (first matches as captains) ===
Of the ten oldest captains, only Marco Reus was captain for the first time in a competitive match, in a win against Liechtenstein for 2022 FIFA World Cup qualification after Germany had already qualified; all the other players only debuted as captain in friendly matches.

| Rank | Player | Date of birth | First match as captain | Opponent | Result | Competition | Age | App No. | Capt apps | Apps |
|---|---|---|---|---|---|---|---|---|---|---|
| 1. | Jens Lehmann | 10 November 1969 | 27 May 2008 (from 67') | Belarus | 2–2 | Friendly match | 38 years, 199 days | 54. | 1 | 61 |
| 2. | Andreas Kupfer | 7 May 1914 | 22 November 1950 (Note: First match after World War II) | Switzerland | 1–0 | Friendly match | 36 years, 199 days | 44. | 1 | 44 |
| 3. | Jakob Streitle | 11 December 1916 | 4 May 1952 | Republic of Ireland | 3–0 | Friendly match | 35 years, 144 days | 15. | 1 | 15 |
| 4. | Hans Hagen | 15 July 1894 | 20 October 1929 | Finland | 4–0 | Friendly match | 35 years, 97 days | 10. | 1 | 12 |
| 5. | Josef Müller | 6 May 1893 | 15 April 1928 | Switzerland | 3–2 | Friendly match | 34 years, 355 days | 12. | 1 | 12 |
| 6. | Karl Tewes | 18 August 1886 | 5 May 1921 | Austria | 3–3 | Friendly match | 34 years, 261 days | 3. | 2 | 6 |
| 7. | Sepp Maier | 28 February 1944 | 11 October 1978 | Czechoslovakia | 4–3 | Friendly match | 34 years, 226 days | 90. | 6 | 95 |
| 8. | Ulf Kirsten (Note: Kirsten also played 49 matches for East Germany, but in these he was not used as a captain.) | 4 December 1965 | 2 September 1998 (from 46') | Malta | 2–1 | Friendly match | 32 years, 272 days | 37. | 2 | 51 |
| 9. | Paul Pömpner | 28 December 1892 | 26 June 1925 | Finland | 5–3 | Friendly match | 32 years, 180 days | 6. | 1 | 6 |
| 10. | Marco Reus | 31 May 1989 | 2 September 2021 (from 82') | Liechtenstein | 2–0 | WC 2022 qualifier | 32 years, 94 days | 45. | 1 | 48 |

=== List of national players who were not born in Germany or Austria ===
| No. | Player | Country of birth | Apps for Germany | First match | Matches against country of birth (score) |
|---|---|---|---|---|---|
| 1. | Fritz Balogh | Czechoslovakia (Bratislava) | 1 | 22 November 1950 | – |
| 2. | Josef Posipal | Romania (Lugoj) | 32 | 17 June 1951 | – |
| 3. | Miroslav Votava | Czechoslovakia (Prague) | 5 | 21 November 1979 | – |
| 4. | Fredi Bobic | Yugoslavia (Maribor) | 37 | 12 October 1994 | 23 June 1996 (2–1 against Croatia); 30 April 2003 (1–0 against Serbia and Montenegro) |
| 5. | Dariusz Wosz | Poland (Piekary Śląskie) | 17 (Note: Wosz also played seven matches for East Germany) | 26 February 1997 | – |
| 6. | Oliver Neuville | Switzerland (Locarno) | 69 | 2 September 1998 | 26 April 2000 (1–1) |
| 7. | Paulo Rink | Brazil (Curitiba) | 13 | 2 September 1998 | – |
| 8. | Mustafa Doğan | Turkey (Yalvaç) | 2 | 30 July 1999 | 9 October 1999 (0–0) |
| 9. | Miroslav Klose | Poland (Opole) | 137 | 24 March 2001 | 14 June 2006 (1–0); 8 June 2008 (2–0); 6 September 2011 (2–2) |
| 10. | Gerald Asamoah | Ghana (Mampong) | 43 | 29 May 2001 | – |
| 11. | Martin Max | Poland (Tarnowskie Góry) | 1 | 17 April 2002 | – |
| 12. | Paul Freier | Poland (Bytom) | 19 | 9 May 2002 | – |
| 13. | Kevin Kurányi | Brazil (Rio de Janeiro) | 52 | 29 March 2003 | 8 September 2004 (1–1), 1 goal 25 June 2005 (2–3) |
| 14. | Lukas Podolski | Poland (Gliwice) | 130 | 6 June 2004 | 14 June 2006 (1–0); 8 June 2008 (2–0), 2 goals 6 September 2011 (2–2); 11 October 2014 (0–2); 4 September 2015 (3–1) |
| 15. | Lukas Sinkiewicz | Poland (Tychy) | 3 | 3 September 2005 | – |
| 16. | Piotr Trochowski | Poland (Tczew) | 35 | 7 October 2006 | – |
| 17. | Marko Marin | Yugoslavia (Gradiška) | 16 | 27 May 2008 | 3 June 2010 (3–1 against Bosnia and Herzegovina); 18 June 2010 (0–1 against Serbia) |
| 18. | Andreas Beck | Soviet Union (Kemerovo) | 9 | 11 February 2009 | – |
| 19. | Cacau | Brazil (Santo André) | 23 | 29 May 2009 | 10 August 2011 (3–2) |
| 20. | Roman Neustädter (Note: Neustädter played for Russia since 2016, also on 15 November 2018 against Germany) | Soviet Union (Dnipropetrowsk) | 2 | 14 November 2012 | – |
| 21. | Mahmoud Dahoud | Syria (Amuda) | 2 | 7 October 2020 | – |
| 22. | Armel Bella-Kotchap | France (Paris) | 2 | 26 September 2022 | – |
| 23. | Youssoufa Moukoko | Cameroon (Yaoundé) | 2 | 16 November 2022 | – |
| 24. | Waldemar Anton | Uzbekistan (Olmaliq) | 12 | 23 March 2024 | – |

== Goals ==
=== Top goalscorers ===
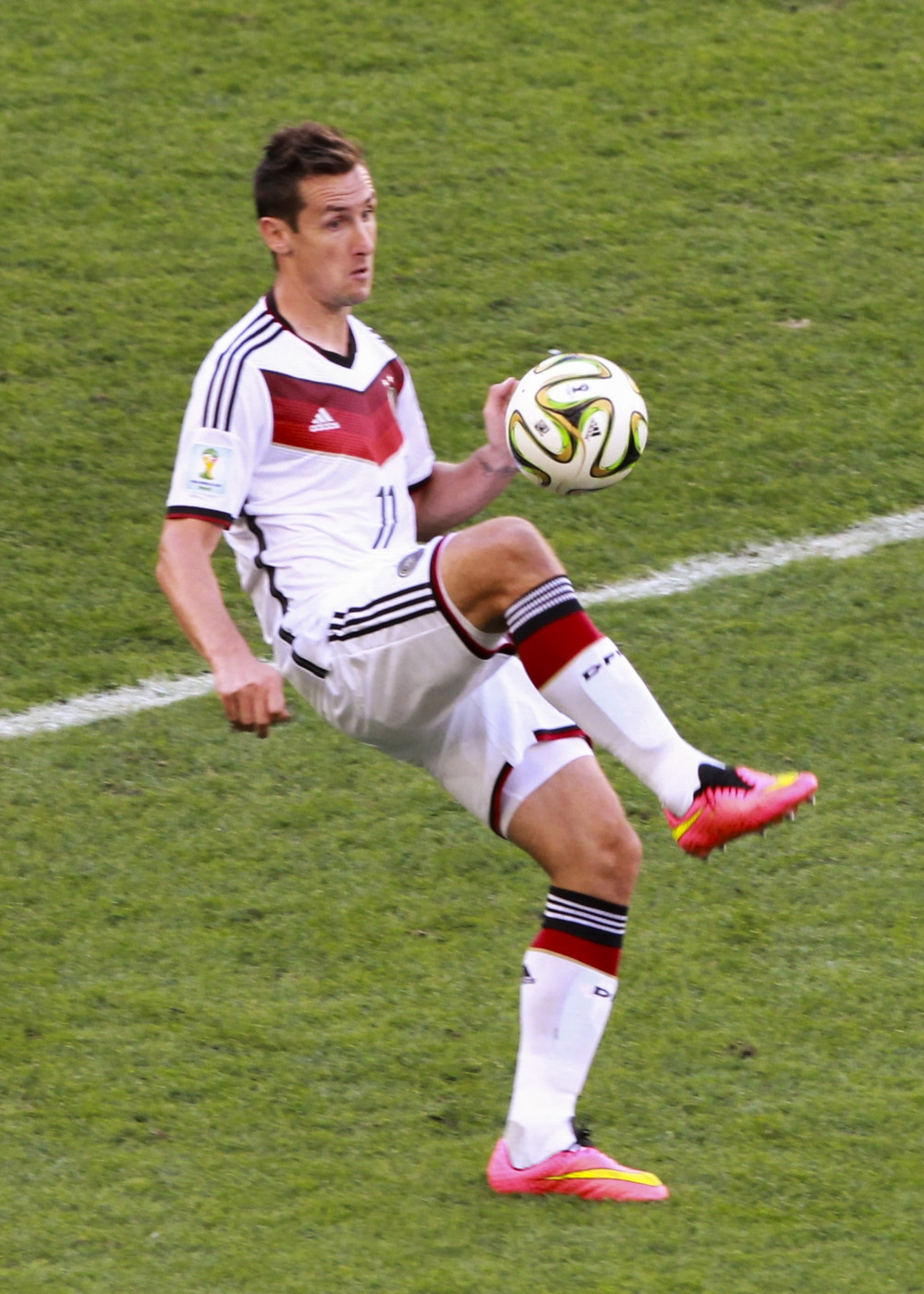
Miroslav Klose is Germany's all-time top scorer with 71 goals.

As of 10 July 2024

| Rank | Player | Goals | Caps | Ratio | Period |
|---|---|---|---|---|---|
| 1 | Miroslav Klose (list) | 71 | 137 | 0.52 | 2001–2014 |
| 2 | Gerd Müller (list) | 68 | 62 | 1.10 | 1966–1974 |
| 3 | Lukas Podolski | 49 | 130 | 0.38 | 2004–2017 |
| 4 | Rudi Völler | 47 | 90 | 0.52 | 1982–1994 |
| 4 | Jürgen Klinsmann | 47 | 108 | 0.44 | 1987–1998 |
| 6 | Karl-Heinz Rummenigge | 45 | 95 | 0.47 | 1976–1986 |
| 6 | Thomas Müller | 45 | 131 | 0.34 | 2010–2024 |
| 8 | Uwe Seeler | 43 | 72 | 0.60 | 1954–1970 |
| 9 | Michael Ballack | 42 | 98 | 0.43 | 1999–2010 |
| 10 | Oliver Bierhoff | 37 | 70 | 0.53 | 1996–2002 |

=== Youngest goalscorers ===
Eleven goalscorers were younger than 20. Lukas Podolski is the youngest player to score two goals in one match, doing so in his eighth match. By contrast, Fritz Walter was the youngest player to score three goals, doing so in his first international match. Jamal Musiala is the youngest competitive goalscorer as well as the youngest player to score his first goal in a competitive fixture, doing so at the age of 18 years and 227 days in a 2022 FIFA World Cup qualifier against North Macedonia; eight of the other nine youngest goalscorers scored in friendly matches.

The following table lists the ten youngest goalscorers.

| Rank | Player | Date of birth | First goal | Opponent | Result | Competition | Age | Total goals | Goals before age 20 |
|---|---|---|---|---|---|---|---|---|---|
| 1. | Marius Hiller | 5 August 1892 | 3 April 1910 | Switzerland | 3–2 | Friendly match | 17 years, 241 days | 1 (Note: Hiller also scored 4 goals in 2 matches at the age of 24 for Argentina.) | 1 |
| 2. | Jamal Musiala | 26 February 2003 | 11 October 2021 | North Macedonia | 4–0 | WC 2022 qualifier | 18 years, 227 days | 8 | 1 |
| 3. | Edmund Conen | 10 November 1914 | 14 January 1934 | Hungary | 3–1 | Friendly match | 19 years, 65 days | 27 | 5 |
| 4. | Willi Fick | 17 February 1891 | 24 April 1910 | Netherlands | 2–4 | Friendly match | 19 years, 66 days | 1 | 1 |
| 5. | Mario Götze | 3 June 1992 | 10 August 2011 | Brazil | 3–2 | Friendly match | 19 years, 68 days | 17 | 2 |
| 5. | Adolf Jäger | 31 March 1889 | 7 June 1908 | Austria | 2–3 | Friendly match | 19 years, 68 days | 10 | 1 |
| 5. | Klaus Stürmer | 9 August 1935 | 16 October 1954 | France | 1–3 | Friendly match | 19 years, 68 days | 1 | 1 |
| 8. | Karl Schlösser | 29 January 1912 | 26 April 1931 | Netherlands | 1–1 | Friendly match | 19 years, 87 days | 1 | 1 |
| 9. | Marko Marin | 13 March 1989 | 20 August 2008 | Belgium | 2–0 | Friendly match | 19 years, 160 days | 1 | 1 |
| 10. | Assan Ouédraogo | 9 May 2006 | 17 November 2025 | Slovakia | 6–0 | WC 2026 qualifier | 19 years, 192 days | 1 | 1 |

=== Oldest goalscorers ===
Seventeen players were over the age of 33 when they scored their last goal, including record goalscorer Miroslav Klose, who also scored the most goals after his 30th birthday. His precursor Gerd Müller scored his last of 68 international goals aged 28 years and 246 days, making him the player with the most goals before his 30th birthday. Klose was 35 years and 362 days old when he scored 69th international goal, the one which saw him replace Müller as the record scorer.

The following table lists the ten oldest goalscorers.

| Rank | Player | Date of birth | Last goal | Opponent | Result | Competition | Age | Total goals | Goals after age 30 |
|---|---|---|---|---|---|---|---|---|---|
| 1. | Lothar Matthäus | 21 March 1961 | 28 July 1999 | New Zealand | 2–0 | Confed Cup 1999 | 38 years, 128 days | 23 | 6 |
| 2. | Richard Kreß | 6 March 1925 | 20 September 1961 | Denmark | 5–1 | Friendly match | 36 years, 198 days | 2 | 2 |
| 3. | Miroslav Klose | 9 June 1978 | 8 July 2014 | Brazil | 7–1 | WC 2014 semi-final | 36 years, 29 days | 71 (Note: 16th World Cup goal) | 32 |
| 4. | Fritz Walter | 31 October 1920 | 26 May 1956 | England | 1–3 | Friendly match | 35 years, 207 days | 33 | 14 |
| 5. | Oliver Neuville | 1 May 1973 | 31 May 2008 | Serbia | 2–1 | Friendly match | 35 years, 30 days | 10 | 6 |
| 6. | Ulf Kirsten | 4 December 1965 | 7 June 2000 | Liechtenstein | 8–2 | Friendly match | 34 years, 186 days | 20 (Note: Kirsten also scored 14 goals for East Germany.) | 14 |
| 7. | Hans Schäfer | 19 October 1927 | 11 April 1962 | Uruguay | 3–0 | Friendly match | 34 years, 175 days | 15 | 5 |
| 8. | Rudi Völler | 13 April 1960 | 2 July 1994 | Belgium | 3–2 | WC 1994 round of 16 | 34 years, 80 days | 47 | 15 |
| 9. | Oliver Bierhoff | 1 May 1968 | 1 June 2002 | Saudi Arabia | 8–0 | WC 2002 group stage | 34 years, 31 days | 37 | 24 |
| 10. | Thomas Müller | 13 September 1989 | 12 September 2023 | France | 2–1 | Friendly match | 33 years, 364 days | 45 | 7 |

=== Hat-tricks ===
For several players with the same number of hat-tricks and total goals, the entry is made chronologically.

| Rank | Player | Hat-tricks | Dates (goals) | Total goals |
|---|---|---|---|---|
| 1. | Gerd Müller | 8 | 8 April 1967 (4), 21 May 1969 (4), 7 June 1970 (3), 10 June 1970 (3), 22 June 1971 (3), 8 September 1971 (3), 26 May 1972 (4), 15 November 1972 (4) | 28 |
| 2. | Edmund Conen | 5 | 27 May 1934 (3), 27 January 1935 (3), 18 August 1935 (3), 1 September 1940 (4), 20 October 1940 (4) | 17 |
| 3. | Richard Hofmann | 5 | 28 May 1928 (3), 23 June 1929 (3), 10 May 1930 (3), 27 September 1931 (3), 1 July 1932 (3) | 15 |
| 4. | Miroslav Klose | 4 | 13 February 2002 (3), 18 May 2002 (3), 1 June 2002 (3), 10 September 2008 (3) | 12 |
| 5. | Uwe Seeler | 3 | 21 October 1959 (3), 20 September 1961 (3), 28 September 1963 (3) | 9 |
| 5. | Karl-Heinz Rummenigge | 3 | 23 September 1981 (3), 18 November 1981 (3), 20 June 1982 (3) | 9 |
| 5. | Oliver Bierhoff | 3 | 20 August 1997 (3), 4 June 1999 (3), 9 May 2002 (3) | 9 |
| 8 | Otto Siffling | 2 | 16 May 1937 (5), 24 October 1937 (3) | 8 |
| 9 | Ernst Willimowski (Note: Willimowski also scored four goals for Poland in a 5–6 World Cup defeat to Brazil on 5 June 1938.) | 2 | 5 October 1941 (3), 18 October 1942 (4) | 7 |
| 9 | Lukas Podolski | 2 | 7 September 2005 (3), 6 September 2006 (4) | 7 |
| 11. | Serge Gnabry | 2 | 11 November 2016 (3), 19 November 2019 (3) | 6 |
| 11. | Otto Harder | 2 | 25 October 1924 (3), 20 June 1926 (3) | 6 |
| 11. | Karl Hohmann | 2 | 22 October 1933 (3), 11 March 1934 (3) | 6 |
| 11. | Franz Binder | 2 | 12 November 1939 (3), 26 November 1939 (3) | 6 |
| 11. | Fritz Walter | 2 | 14 July 1940 (3), 15 August 1942 (3) | 6 |
| 11. | André Schürrle | 2 | 15 October 2013 (3), 13 June 2015 (3) | 6 |

=== Best goal ratio ===
Gottfried Fuchs is the only player with a ratio of more than two goals per match.

| Rank | Player | Goals | Caps | Ratio |
|---|---|---|---|---|
| 1 | Gottfried Fuchs | 13 | 6 | 2.17 |
| 2 | Ludwig Damminger | 5 | 3 | 1.67 |
| 2 | Ernst Poertgen | 5 | 3 | 1.67 |
| 4 | Ernst Willimowski | 13 | 8 | 1.63 |
| 5 | Georg Frank | 5 | 4 | 1.25 |
| 5 | Oskar Rohr | 5 | 4 | 1.25 |
| 7 | August Klingler | 6 | 5 | 1.20 |
| 8 | Franz Binder | 10 | 9 | 1.11 |
| 9 | Gerd Müller | 68 | 62 | 1.10 |
| 10 | Helmut Schön | 17 | 16 | 1.06 |

=== Penalties ===
As of 10 October 2025, 142 penalties have been given for Germany in 138 different matches. Of these, 105 were converted (74%). The first penalty was in Germany's second match to make the score 1–1 (the final score was 1–5). In two cases, Germany scored two penalties in a single match, and on each occasion both penalties were converted by the same player (Fritz Walter in the 1954 World Cup semi-finals and Bastian Schweinsteiger in a friendly). On three occasions did the same player, Fritz Förderer, Torsten Frings, and Lukas Podolski, successfully convert one penalty but miss another in the same match.

The most frequent penalty taker for Germany was Michael Ballack, converting ten of eleven penalties taken. The most penalty misses recorded was by Jürgen Klinsmann, who could not convert three of six penalties taken. 28 penalties were converted by the captain (c) of the team, with Lothar Matthäus (seven times) converting the most penalties as captain.

Germany have received the most penalties against Bulgaria; they earned nine penalties in a total of 21 matches against the side (42% of matches), of which eight were converted. Germany have received six penalties against a reigning world champion, all of which were converted. Germany have also received thirteen penalties as reigning world champions, of which ten were converted.

In sixteen matches, the conversion of the penalty was decisive to the game's outcome, with four converted penalties reducing a deficit leading to a draw and one of these draws followed by another penalty for a win. In 37 matches, the converted penalty was the first goal, including Germany's first match against world champions Brazil in May 1963. Of these matches, the opponents managed to draw four times and win the match five times. On seven occasions, the converted penalty was the only goal of the match.

Significant penalties include the converted penalty by Herbert Burdenski in Germany's first match after World War II, as well as the penalty converted in the 1990 FIFA World Cup final, which was taken by Andreas Brehme instead of originally-intended kicker Lothar Matthäus. This made Germany the first team to be given a penalty in two World Cup finals, after becoming the first team to concede a penalty in a FIFA World Cup final in 1974. Germany's 1990 World Cup quarter-final victory also saw the converted penalty being the only goal of the match.

In total, Germany converted 51 penalties in friendly matches, 18 in European Championship qualifiers, 12 in World Cup qualifiers, 10 in World Cup matches and 4 in Nations League matches.

Twelve opposition goalkeepers faced a German penalty twice. Of these penalties, Germany only failed to score either against Alan Fettis of Northern Ireland. John Bonello (Malta) and Borislav Mihaylov (Bulgaria) were each able to save one of the two penalties.

Germany have been given the most penalties by Italian and Swiss referees (eleven each), with the Swiss referees officiating just over half as many matches as the Italians (55 vs 109). Additionally, two of the three German referees who led a match of the German team gave a penalty for Germany. In both cases, the penalties were not decisive to the match as both ended 5–1: once in favour of the England amateur team and once for the German team against Croatia. Italian Nicola Rizzoli is the only referee to have awarded three penalties for the German team, including two in the same match; he also gave one penalty against the side. Nine other referees have given Germany two penalties.

==== Penalty shoot-outs ====
Germany have been involved in eight penalty shoot-outs, six of which were won and two lost. Germany is the only team ever to participate in at least four World Cup shoot-outs with a 100 percent win rate. Consequently, of Argentina's record seven World Cup shoot-outs, their sole defeat was against Germany in 2006. The most successful penalty takers in shoot-outs for Germany are Andreas Brehme, Pierre Littbarski, Lothar Matthäus and Olaf Thon, with two penalties converted each. Harald Schumacher is the most successful goalkeeper in shoot-outs, with four penalties saved. Sepp Maier (1976) and Eike Immel (1988) are the only goalkeepers who could not save a single penalty in a shoot-out. On four occasions, all German takers were successful in a shoot-out, and in three of these cases only four German kickers were required before the match was won. Even in Germany's two lost shoot-outs, the fifth kicker was not required to take a penalty. In two cases (1982 and 1996), an additional sixth German taker secured a shoot-out victory, while in 2016 this was achieved by the ninth kicker.

== Sending off ==
So far, 27 German players have been sent off in a match, five of which were yellow-red cards from 1991. The first player to be sent off was Hans Kalb, in a match against Uruguay on 3 June 1928 at the 1928 Olympics; he thus also became the first captain of the German team to be sent off. Jérôme Boateng was the first player to be dismissed on his international debut, on 10 October 2009 in Moscow against Russia. The first German player to be shown a red card in a World Cup match (used since 1970) was Thomas Berthold on 21 June 1986, in a quarter-final game against Mexico. Berthold was also the first German international to be sent off twice. Jérôme Boateng, Carsten Ramelow and Christian Wörns were also each sent off twice. Leroy Sané was the last player to be sent off, being dismissed on 21 November 2023 in a friendly match against Austria. Ron-Robert Zieler was the first German goalkeeper to be sent off, on 15 August 2012 against Argentina.

The most players to be sent off in a single Germany match is three, against Uruguay on 3 June 1928: the German players Hans Kalb and Richard Hofmann were dismissed, in addition to the Uruguayan José Nasazzi.

Two German players have been sent off after being brought on as a substitute: Ulf Kirsten and Bastian Schweinsteiger.

== Team results ==
=== Frequency of match results ===
2–1 is the most frequent scoreline in favour of the Germany national team, with 88 matches (8.94%) ending like this. This is followed by a scoreline of 1–1 (86 matches) and 1–0 (85 matches). 1–0 was also the score for Germany's World Cup final victories in 1990 and 2014, and their Confederations Cup victory in 2017. 2–1 was the score for their World Cup final win in 1974 and their European Championship final victories in 1980 and 1996. 2–0 is the next most common result (81 matches). Of the matches lost by Germany, 0–1 is the most frequent result (46 matches), followed by 1–2 (44 matches). 51 of Germany's matches ended scoreless (5.18%), and they have played a total of 341 matches (34.65%) without conceding, seven of which came consecutively between 2016 and 2017.

| | Goals conceded | | | | | | | | | |
| Goals of Germany | 0 | 1 | 2 | 3 | 4 | 5 | 6 | 7 | 8 | 9 |
|---|---|---|---|---|---|---|---|---|---|---|
| 0 | 51 (Note: Includes one match won via penalty shoot-out) | 47 | 27 | 12 | 1 | 1 | 2 | 0 | 0 | 1 |
| 1 | 83 | 83 (Note: Includes four matches won and one match lost via penalty shoot-out) | 43 | 27 | 9 | 5 | 0 | 0 | 0 | 0 |
| 2 | 85 | 86 | 44 (Note: Includes one match lost via penalty shoot-out) | 18 | 6 | 1 | 1 | 0 | 0 | 0 |
| 3 | 51 | 45 | 31 | 15 | 4 | 2 | 3 | 0 | 1 | 0 |
| 4 | 30 | 32 | 18 | 8 | 4 | 0 | 0 | 0 | 0 | 0 |
| 5 | 11 | 18 | 7 | 6 | 0 | 1 | 0 | 0 | 0 | 0 |
| 6 | 10 | 10 | 4 | 0 | 0 | 0 | 0 | 0 | 0 | 0 |
| 7 | 9 | 6 | 3 | 1 | 0 | 0 | 0 | 0 | 0 | 0 |
| 8 | 7 | 1 | 1 | 0 | 0 | 0 | 0 | 0 | 0 | 0 |
| 9 | 2 | 2 | 0 | 1 | 0 | 0 | 0 | 0 | 0 | 0 |
| 10 | 0 | 0 | 0 | 0 | 0 | 0 | 0 | 0 | 0 | 0 |
| 11 | 0 | 0 | 0 | 0 | 0 | 0 | 0 | 0 | 0 | 0 |
| 12 | 1 | 0 | 0 | 0 | 0 | 0 | 0 | 0 | 0 | 0 |
| 13 | 2 | 0 | 0 | 0 | 0 | 0 | 0 | 0 | 0 | 0 |
| 14 | 0 | 0 | 0 | 0 | 0 | 0 | 0 | 0 | 0 | 0 |
| 15 | 0 | 0 | 0 | 0 | 0 | 0 | 0 | 0 | 0 | 0 |
| 16 | 1 | 0 | 0 | 0 | 0 | 0 | 0 | 0 | 0 | 0 |

=== Biggest wins ===
| Rank | Result (half-time) | Opponent | Venue | Date | Competition | German goalscorers (goals) | Notes |
|---|---|---|---|---|---|---|---|
| 1. | 16–0 (8–0) | Russian Empire (Note: The defeat is the highest defeat of the opponent country) | Stockholm, Sweden | 1 July 1912 | OG 1912 consolation tour first round | Gottfried Fuchs (10), Fritz Förderer (4), Karl Burger (1), (Note: (So far) only goal of the player) Emil Oberle (1) | Biggest win |
| 2. | 13–0 (8–0) | Finland | Leipzig | 1 September 1940 | Friendly match | Wilhelm Hahnemann (Austria) (6), Edmund Conen (4), Fritz Walter (2), Willi Arlt (1) | Biggest home win |
| 2. | 13–0 (6–0) | San Marino | Serravalle, San Marino | 6 September 2006 | EC 2008 qualifier | Lukas Podolski (4), Thomas Hitzlsperger (2), Miroslav Klose (2), Bastian Schweinsteiger (2), Michael Ballack (1), Manuel Friedrich (1), Bernd Schneider (1) | Biggest away win |
| 4. | 12–0 (7–0) | Cyprus | Essen | 21 May 1969 | WC 1970 qualifier | Gerd Müller (4), Wolfgang Overath (3), Helmut Haller (2), Sigfried Held (1), Horst-Dieter Höttges (1), Max Lorenz (1) | |
| 5. | 9–0 (2–0) | Luxembourg (Note: The defeat is one of the highest losses of the opponent country; the opponent lost at least one other match by the same goal difference) | Berlin | 4 August 1936 | OG 1936 first round | Wilhelm Simetsreiter (3), Adolf Urban (3), Josef Gauchel (2), Franz Elbern (1) | |
| 5. | 9–0 (4–0) | Liechtenstein | Wolfsburg | 11 November 2021 | WC 2022 qualifier | İlkay Gündoğan (1), Daniel Kaufmann (1) (OG), Leroy Sané (2), Marco Reus (1), Thomas Müller (1), Ridle Baku (1), Maximilian Göppel (1) (o.g.) | |
| 7. | 9–1 (5–1) | Luxembourg | Luxembourg City, Luxembourg | 11 March 1934 | WC 1934 qualifier | Josef Rasselnberg (4), Karl Hohmann (3), Ernst Albrecht (1), Willi Wigold (1) | |
| 7. | 9–1 (4–0) | Liechtenstein | Mannheim | 4 June 1996 | Friendly match | Stefan Kuntz (2), Andreas Möller (2), Oliver Bierhoff (1), Jürgen Klinsmann (1), Jürgen Kohler (1), Matthias Sammer (1), Christian Ziege (1) | |
| 9. | 8–0 (4–0) | Denmark | Breslau | 16 May 1937 | Friendly match | Otto Siffling (5), Ernst Lehner (1), Fritz Szepan (1), Adolf Urban (1) | |
| 9. | 8–0 (4–0) | Malta | Dortmund | 28 February 1976 | EC 1976 qualifier | Erich Beer (2), Jupp Heynckes (2), Ronnie Worm (2), Bernd Hölzenbein (1), Berti Vogts (1) | |
| 9. | 8–0 (3–0) | Malta | Bremen | 27 February 1980 | EC 1980 qualifier | Klaus Allofs (2), Klaus Fischer(2), Rainer Bonhof (1), Walter Kelsch (1), Karl-Heinz Rummenigge (1), John Holland (1) (o.g.) | |
| 9. | 8–0 (5–0) | Albania | Dortmund | 18 November 1981 | WC 1982 qualifier | Karl-Heinz Rummenigge (3), Klaus Fischer (2), Paul Breitner (1), Manfred Kaltz (1), Pierre Littbarski (1) | |
| 9. | 8–0 (4–0) | Saudi Arabia | Sapporo, Japan | 1 June 2002 | WC 2002 group stage | Miroslav Klose (3), Michael Ballack (1), Oliver Bierhoff (1), Carsten Jancker (1), Thomas Linke (1), Bernd Schneider (1) | Biggest World Cup win |
| 9. | 8–0 (6–0) | San Marino | Serravalle, San Marino | 11 November 2016 | WC 2018 qualifier | Serge Gnabry (3), Jonas Hector (2), Sami Khedira (1), Kevin Volland (1), Mattia Stefanelli (1) (o.g.) | |
| 9. | 8–0 (5–0) | Estonia | Mainz | 11 June 2019 | EC 2020 qualifier | Marco Reus (2), Serge Gnabry (2), Leon Goretzka (1), İlkay Gündoğan (1), Timo Werner (1), Leroy Sané (1) | |

=== Fifteen consecutive wins in all competitive matches (world record) ===
| Date | Opponent | Venue | Result | Type | German goalscorers |
|---|---|---|---|---|---|
| 10 July 2010 | Uruguay | Port Elizabeth, South Africa | 3–2 | WC 2010 3rd place | Müller 19', Jansen 56', Khedira 82' |
| 3 September 2010 | Belgium | Brussels, Belgium | 1–0 | EC 2012 qualifier | Klose 51' |
| 7 September 2010 | Azerbaijan | Köln | 6–1 | EC 2012 qualifier | Westermann 28', Podolski 45+1', Klose 45+2', 90+2', Sadygov 53' (o.g.), Badstuber 86' |
| 8 October 2010 | Turkey | Berlin | 3–0 | EC 2012 qualifier | Klose 42', 87', Özil 79' |
| 12 October 2010 | Kazakhstan | Astana, Kazakhstan | 3–0 | EC 2012 qualifier | Klose 48', Gómez 76', Podolski 85' |
| 26 March 2011 | Kazakhstan | Kaiserslautern | 4–0 | EC 2012 qualifier | Klose 3', 88', Müller 25', 43' |
| 3 June 2011 | Austria | Vienna, Austria | 2–1 | EC 2012 qualifier | Gómez 44', 90' |
| 7 June 2011 | Azerbaijan | Baku, Azerbaijan | 3–1 | EC 2012 qualifier | Özil 30', Gómez 41', Schürrle 90+3' |
| 2 September 2011 | Austria | Gelsenkirchen | 6–2 | EC 2012 qualifier | Klose 8', Özil 23', 47', Podolski 28', Schürrle 83', Götze 88' |
| 7 October 2011 | Turkey | Istanbul, Turkey | 3–1 | EC 2012 qualifier | Gómez 35', Müller 66', Schweinsteiger 86' (pen.) |
| 11 October 2011 | Belgium | Düsseldorf | 3–1 | EC 2012 qualifier | Özil 30', Schürrle 33', Gómez 48' |
| 9 June 2012 | Portugal | Lviv, Ukraine | 1–0 | EC 2012 group stage | Gómez 72' |
| 13 June 2012 | Netherlands | Kharkiv, Ukraine | 2–1 | EC 2012 group stage | Gómez 24', 38' |
| 17 June 2012 | Denmark | Lviv, Ukraine | 2–1 | EC 2012 group stage | Podolski 19', Bender 80' |
| 22 June 2012 | Greece | Gdańsk, Poland | 4–2 | EC 2012 quarter-final | Lahm 39', Khedira 61', Klose 68', Reus 74' |

=== Highest-scoring draws ===
| Rank | Result (half-time) | Opponent | Venue | Date | Competition | German goalscorers (goals) | Notes |
|---|---|---|---|---|---|---|---|
| 1. | 5–5 (3–2) | Netherlands | Zwolle, Netherlands | 24 March 1912 | Friendly match | Julius Hirsch (4), Gottfried Fuchs (1) | |
| 2. | 4–4 (4–1) | Hungary | Budapest, Hungary | 14 April 1912 | Friendly match | Adolf Jäger (1), Eugen Kipp (1), Ernst Möller (1), Willi Worpitzky (1) | Germany lead 4–1 until the 59th minute |
| 2. | 4–4 (0–1) | Netherlands | Amsterdam, Netherlands | 5 April 1914 | Friendly match | Otto Harder (Note: This was Otto Harder's first international match and international goal) (1), Adolf Jäger (1), Richard Queck (Note: This was Richard Queck and Karl Wegele's last international match and international goals) (1), Karl Wegele (1) | Germany equalized 4–4 in the 90th minute, end their longest streak of matches lost (seven); last match before World War I |
| 2. | 4–4 (2–4) | Bohemia and Moravia | Breslau | 12 November 1939 | Friendly match | Franz Binder (Austria) (3), Paul Janes (1) | Germany were initially trailing 0–3 |
| 2. | 4–4 (3–0) | Sweden | Berlin | 16 October 2012 | WC 2014 qualifier | Miroslav Klose (2), Per Mertesacker (1), Mesut Özil (1) | Germany were leading 4–0 until the 62nd minute; the equalizer came in the 3rd minute of second half stoppage time |

=== Biggest defeats ===
| Rank | Result (half-time) | Opponent | Venue | Date | Competition | German goalscorers (goals) | Notes |
|---|---|---|---|---|---|---|---|
| 1. | 0–9 (0–5) | England Amateurs | Oxford, England | 13 March 1909 | Friendly match | | Biggest defeat, biggest away defeat |
| 2. | 0–6 (0–3) | Spain | Seville, Spain | 17 November 2020 | UNL 2020–21 | | Biggest defeat in a competitive match |
| 2. | 0–6 (0–3) | Austria | Berlin | 24 May 1931 | Friendly match | | Biggest home defeat |
| 4. | 0–5 (0–2) | Austria | Vienna, Austria | 13 September 1931 | Friendly match | | |
| 5. | 3–8 (1–3) | Hungary | Basel, Switzerland | 20 June 1954 | WC 1954 group stage | Richard Herrmann (1), (Note: Only international goal for the player) Alfred Pfaff (1), Helmut Rahn (1) | Biggest World Cup defeat; only in one other match (5–4 win against Switzerland on 17 September 1955) did Hungary's "Golden Team" concede more goals |
| 6. | 0–4 (0–0) | Brazil | Guadalajara, Mexico | 24 July 1999 | Confed-Cup 1999 group stage | | First ever Confederations Cup match |
| 7. | 1–5 (1–3) | England Amateurs | Berlin-Mariendorf | 20 April 1908 | Friendly match | Fritz Förderer (1) | First ever home match |
| 7. | 1–5 (1–0) | Austria | Stockholm, Sweden | 29 June 1912 | OG 1912 first round | Adolf Jäger (1) | First ever match on neutral ground, first ever match at Olympic Games |
| 7. | 1–5 (1–2) | Hungary | Budapest, Hungary | 24 September 1939 | Friendly match | Ernst Lehner (1) | First match during World War II |
| 7. | 1–5 (1–2) | England | Munich | 1 September 2001 | WC 2002 qualifier | Carsten Jancker (1) | Biggest defeat in qualification match |
| 7. | 1–5 (0–4) | Romania | Bucharest, Romania | 28 April 2004 | friendly match | Philipp Lahm (1) (Note: First international goal for the player) | |
| 12. | 2–6 (0–4) | Belgium | Antwerp, Belgium | 23 November 1913 | Friendly match | Gottfried Fuchs (1), Karl Wegele (1) | |

== Attendance ==
There have been thirteen matches played involving the German team with at least 100,000 spectators. Only two of these matches place in Germany. Two matches took place at a neutral venue, both at the Estadio Azteca. The majority of these matches took place when standing room was allowed at international matches and the stadiums thus had higher capacities. Currently, there are only two stadiums worldwide with a capacity of at least 100,000 spectators.

| Rank | Attendance | Venue | Stadium | Opponent | Date | Competition | Result | Notes |
|---|---|---|---|---|---|---|---|---|
| 1 | 150,289 | Rio de Janeiro, Brazil | Estádio do Maracanã | Brazil | 21 March 1982 | Friendly match | 0–1 | |
| 2 | 143,315 | Rio de Janeiro, Brazil | Estádio do Maracanã | Brazil | 6 June 1965 | Friendly match | 0–2 | |
| 3 | 114,600 | Mexico City, Mexico | Estadio Azteca | Argentina | 29 June 1986 | WC 1986 Final | 2–3 | |
| 4 | 114,000 | Mexico City, Mexico | Estadio Azteca | Mexico | 22 December 1993 | Friendly match | 0–0 | |
| 5 | 110,000 | Teheran, Iran | Azadi Stadium | Iran | 9 October 2004 | Friendly match | 2–0 | First match of Per Mertesacker |
| 6 | 106,066 | Rio de Janeiro, Brazil | Estádio do Maracanã | Brazil | 12 June 1977 | Friendly match | 1–1 | |
| 7 | 105,000 | Berlin | Olympiastadion Berlin | England | 14 May 1938 | Friendly match | 3–6 | First matches of Austrian players in the Germany national team |
| 8 | 104,403 | Mexico City, Mexico | Estadio Azteca | Uruguay | 20 June 1970 | WC 1970 3rd place | 1–0 | |
| 9 | 103,415 | Glasgow, Scotland | Hampden Park | Scotland | 6 May 1959 | Friendly match | 2–3 | |
| 10 | 102,444 | Mexico City, Mexico | Estadio Azteca | Italy | 17 June 1970 | WC 1970 semi-final | 3–4 (a.e.t.) | First match at a neutral venue in front of more than 100,000 spectators |
| 11 | 102,000 | Stuttgart | Neckarstadion | Switzerland | 22 November 1950 | Friendly match | 1–0 | First match after World War II |
| 12 | 100,000 | London, England | Wembley Stadium | England | 1 December 1954 | Friendly match | 1–3 | First match of Jupp Derwall as manager |
| 12 | 100,000 | London, England | Wembley Stadium | England | 12 March 1975 | Friendly match | 0–2 | 400th Germany match |

== Match statistics ==
=== Consideration of extensions and penalty shoot-outs ===
Matches that were decided in extra time are scored according to their result.

The Germany national team partook in seven penalty shoot-outs at World Cup finals and European Championships, winning six and losing one. They also took part in a shoot-out during the Four Nations Tournament in 1988, which they lost.

The matches which were decided by penalty shoot-out are counted below as draws. The goals scored in shoot-outs are not taken into account for overall goals scored, goals conceded or goal difference.

=== Opponents to continental federations ===
| Continental Association | Pld | W | D | L | GF | GA | GD |
|---|---|---|---|---|---|---|---|
| UEFA (Europe) (Note: Includes matches against Israel, which neither belonged to AFC nor UEFA between 1974 and 1991, but were admitted to UEFA in 1991.) | 878 | 510 | 184 | 183 | 1,999 | 1,023 | +976 |
| CONMEBOL (South America) | 81 | 35 | 18 | 28 | 138 | 112 | +26 |
| CONCACAF (North and Middle America) | 31 | 19 | 6 | 6 | 75 | 38 | +37 |
| CAF (Africa) | 26 | 17 | 6 | 3 | 55 | 23 | +32 |
| AFC (Asia) (Note: Includes matches against Australia since moving to AFC in 2006.) | 26 | 18 | 3 | 5 | 70 | 27 | +43 |
| OFC (Oceania) (Note: Includes matches against Australia until moving to AFC in 2006.) | 3 | 3 | 0 | 0 | 9 | 3 | +6 |
| Total | 1,045 | 603 | 217 | 225 | 2,345 | 1,225 | +1,120 |

=== Match type ===
UEFA only evaluates the matches that have been played in a final tournament as European Championship matches.

For this reason, the four European Championship quarter-finals of 1972 and 1976 are considered European Championship qualifiers.

| Competition | Pld | W | D | L | GF | GA | GD |
|---|---|---|---|---|---|---|---|
| Friendly: U.S. Cup (1993); Four Nations Tournament (1988); Mundialito (1981); Mexico Cup (1985); Anniversary Matches | 584 | 307 | 124 | 153 | 1,248 | 774 | +474 |
| Friendly: U.S. Cup (1993); Four Nations Tournament (1988); Mundialito (1981); Mexico Cup (1985); Anniversary Matches | 3 | 2 | 1 | 0 | 9 | 7 | +2 |
| Friendly: U.S. Cup (1993); Four Nations Tournament (1988); Mundialito (1981); Mexico Cup (1985); Anniversary Matches | 2 | 1 | 1 | 0 | 2 | 1 | +1 |
| Friendly: U.S. Cup (1993); Four Nations Tournament (1988); Mundialito (1981); Mexico Cup (1985); Anniversary Matches | 2 | 0 | 0 | 2 | 2 | 6 | −4 |
| Friendly: U.S. Cup (1993); Four Nations Tournament (1988); Mundialito (1981); Mexico Cup (1985); Anniversary Matches | 2 | 0 | 0 | 2 | 0 | 5 | −5 |
| Friendly: U.S. Cup (1993); Four Nations Tournament (1988); Mundialito (1981); Mexico Cup (1985); Anniversary Matches | 12 | 9 | 1 | 2 | 30 | 15 | +15 |
| World Cup (WC) | 116 | 70 | 22 | 24 | 243 | 135 | +108 |
| World Cup qualification | 110 | 88 | 18 | 4 | 344 | 77 | +267 |
| European Championship (EC) | 58 | 30 | 14 | 14 | 89 | 59 | +30 |
| European Championship qualification | 106 | 76 | 20 | 10 | 267 | 68 | +199 |
| Confederations Cup (Confed-Cup) | 13 | 8 | 2 | 3 | 29 | 22 | +7 |
| Nations League (NL) | 30 | 9 | 14 | 7 | 51 | 43 | +8 |
| Olympic Games (OG) | 7 | 3 | 0 | 4 | 32 | 14 | +18 |
| Total | 1,045 | 603 | 217 | 225 | 2,346 | 1,226 | +1,120 |

=== All international matches ===
The Germany national team has played against 91 different national teams. In Europe, only Norway (95) and Sweden (95) have played against more different national teams.

Below are:

- 9 of the currently 56 national teams of the CAF
- 10 of the 47 national teams of the AFC
- 1 of the currently 13 national teams of the OFC
- 50 of the other 54 national teams of UEFA (no matches have been played against Andorra, Kosovo or Montenegro)
- 4 of the currently 41 national teams of CONCACAF
- 9 of the 10 national teams of CONMEBOL (no match has been played against Venezuela)
- 9 former national teams (in italics), of which 6 belonged to UEFA at the time of the last matches.

Bosnia and Herzegovina, Cyprus, Denmark, Finland, Israel, Russia (as the Russian Empire) and San Marino suffered their highest losses against Germany, while Brazil, Estonia, Hungary, Luxembourg and Slovakia suffered their joint-highest defeats against Germany. Germany was the first international opponent in Slovakia in 1939.

The Germany national team has the following balance sheets (as of 1 October 2026):

| Team | Association | Type of match | Pld | W | D | L | GF | GA | GD | Competitive meetings |
|---|---|---|---|---|---|---|---|---|---|---|
| Albania | UEFA | Competitive | 14 | 13 | 1 | 0 | 38 | 10 | +28 | WC qualification: 1982, 1998, 2002 EC qualification: 1968, 1972, 1984, 1996 |
| Albania | UEFA | Total | 14 | 13 | 1 | 0 | 38 | 10 | +28 | WC qualification: 1982, 1998, 2002 EC qualification: 1968, 1972, 1984, 1996 |
| Algeria | CAF | | | | | | | | | |
| Algeria | CAF | Competitive | 2 | 1 | 0 | 1 | 3 | 3 | 0 | WC: GS 1982, R16 2014 |
| Algeria | CAF | Friendly | 1 | 0 | 0 | 1 | 0 | 2 | −2 | WC: GS 1982, R16 2014 |
| Algeria | CAF | Total | 3 | 1 | 0 | 2 | 3 | 5 | −2 | WC: GS 1982, R16 2014 |
| Argentina | CONMEBOL | | | | | | | | | |
| Argentina | CONMEBOL | Competitive | 8 | 4 | 3 | 1 | 14 | 7 | +7 | WC: GS 1958, 1966, QF 2006, 2010, F 1986, 1990, 2014 (Note: The pairing Germany - Argentina is (besides Sweden - Brazil) the most common pairing at World Championships. So far, both teams met seven times. Germany won four times and Argentina once. Two games ended in a draw, followed by a penalty shoot-out that Germany could win.) Confed-Cup: GS 2005 |
| Argentina | CONMEBOL | Friendly | 15 | 3 | 3 | 9 | 19 | 27 | −8 | WC: GS 1958, 1966, QF 2006, 2010, F 1986, 1990, 2014 Confed-Cup: GS 2005 |
| Argentina | CONMEBOL | Total | 23 | 7 | 6 | 10 | 33 | 34 | −1 | WC: GS 1958, 1966, QF 2006, 2010, F 1986, 1990, 2014 Confed-Cup: GS 2005 |
| Armenia | UEFA | Competitive | 4 | 4 | 0 | 0 | 19 | 2 | +17 | WC qualification: 1998, 2022 |
| Armenia | UEFA | Friendly | 1 | 1 | 0 | 0 | 6 | 1 | +5 | WC qualification: 1998, 2022 |
| Armenia | UEFA | Total | 5 | 5 | 0 | 0 | 25 | 3 | +22 | WC qualification: 1998, 2022 |
| Australia | OFC/AFC | | | | | | | | | |
| Australia | OFC/AFC | Competitive | 4 | 4 | 0 | 0 | 14 | 5 | +9 | WC: GS 1974, 2010 Confed-Cup: GS 2005, 2017 |
| Australia | OFC/AFC | Friendly | 2 | 0 | 1 | 1 | 3 | 4 | −1 | WC: GS 1974, 2010 Confed-Cup: GS 2005, 2017 |
| Australia | OFC/AFC | Total | 6 | 4 | 1 | 1 | 17 | 9 | +8 | WC: GS 1974, 2010 Confed-Cup: GS 2005, 2017 |
| Austria | UEFA | Competitive | 16 | 13 | 1 | 2 | 38 | 16 | +22 | OG: R16 1912 WC: 3rd place 1934, SF 1954, 2GS 1978, GS 1982 WC qualification: 1970, 1982, 2014 EC: GS 2008 EC qualification: 1984, 2012 |
| Austria | UEFA | Friendly | 25 | 12 | 5 | 8 | 52 | 43 | +9 | OG: R16 1912 WC: 3rd place 1934, SF 1954, 2GS 1978, GS 1982 WC qualification: 1970, 1982, 2014 EC: GS 2008 EC qualification: 1984, 2012 |
| Austria | UEFA | Total | 41 | 25 | 6 | 10 | 90 | 59 | +31 | OG: R16 1912 WC: 3rd place 1934, SF 1954, 2GS 1978, GS 1982 WC qualification: 1970, 1982, 2014 EC: GS 2008 EC qualification: 1984, 2012 |
| Azerbaijan | UEFA | Competitive | 6 | 6 | 0 | 0 | 24 | 4 | +20 | WC qualification: 2010, 2018 EC qualification: 2012 |
| Azerbaijan | UEFA | Total | 6 | 6 | 0 | 0 | 24 | 4 | +20 | WC qualification: 2010, 2018 EC qualification: 2012 |
| Belarus | UEFA | Competitive | 2 | 2 | 0 | 0 | 6 | 0 | +6 | EC qualification: 2020 |
| Belarus | UEFA | Friendly | 1 | 0 | 1 | 0 | 2 | 2 | 0 | EC qualification: 2020 |
| Belarus | UEFA | Total | 3 | 2 | 1 | 0 | 8 | 2 | +6 | EC qualification: 2020 |
| Belgium | UEFA | Competitive | 8 | 8 | 0 | 0 | 18 | 7 | +11 | WC: GS 1934, R16 1994 EC: SF 1972, F 1980 EC qualification: 1992, 2012 |
| Belgium | UEFA | Friendly | 18 | 12 | 1 | 5 | 42 | 22 | +20 | WC: GS 1934, R16 1994 EC: SF 1972, F 1980 EC qualification: 1992, 2012 |
| Belgium | UEFA | Total | 26 | 20 | 1 | 5 | 60 | 29 | +31 | WC: GS 1934, R16 1994 EC: SF 1972, F 1980 EC qualification: 1992, 2012 |
| Bohemia and Moravia | (Note: The matches against Bohemia and Moravia and Saarland took place before the founding of UEFA.) | Friendly | 1 | 0 | 1 | 0 | 4 | 4 | 0 | |
| Bohemia and Moravia | (Note: The matches against Bohemia and Moravia and Saarland took place before the founding of UEFA.) | Total | 1 | 0 | 1 | 0 | 4 | 4 | 0 | |
| Bolivia | CONMEBOL | Competitive | 1 | 1 | 0 | 0 | 1 | 0 | +1 | WC: GS 1994 |
| Bolivia | CONMEBOL | Total | 1 | 1 | 0 | 0 | 1 | 0 | +1 | WC: GS 1994 |
| Bosnia and Herzegovina | UEFA | Competitive | 2 | 2 | 0 | 0 | 9 | 1 | +8 | NL: GS 2024/25 |
| Bosnia and Herzegovina | UEFA | Friendly | 2 | 1 | 1 | 0 | 4 | 2 | +2 | NL: GS 2024/25 |
| Bosnia and Herzegovina | UEFA | Total | 4 | 3 | 1 | 0 | 13 | 3 | +10 | NL: GS 2024/25 |
| Brazil | CONMEBOL | Competitive | 4 | 1 | 0 | 3 | 9 | 10 | −1 | WC: F 2002, SF 2014 Confed-Cup: GS 1999, SF 2005 |
| Brazil | CONMEBOL | Friendly | 19 | 4 | 5 | 10 | 22 | 31 | −9 | WC: F 2002, SF 2014 Confed-Cup: GS 1999, SF 2005 |
| Brazil | CONMEBOL | Total | 23 | 5 | 5 | 13 | 31 | 41 | −10 | WC: F 2002, SF 2014 Confed-Cup: GS 1999, SF 2005 |
| Bulgaria | UEFA | Competitive | 8 | 5 | 1 | 2 | 20 | 10 | +10 | WC: GS 1970, QF 1994 WC qualification: 1982 EC qualification: 1976, 1996 |
| Bulgaria | UEFA | Friendly | 13 | 11 | 1 | 1 | 36 | 14 | +22 | WC: GS 1970, QF 1994 WC qualification: 1982 EC qualification: 1976, 1996 |
| Bulgaria | UEFA | Total | 21 | 16 | 2 | 3 | 56 | 24 | +32 | WC: GS 1970, QF 1994 WC qualification: 1982 EC qualification: 1976, 1996 |
| Cameroon | CAF | Competitive | 2 | 2 | 0 | 0 | 5 | 1 | +4 | WC: GS 2002 Confed-Cup: GS 2017 |
| Cameroon | CAF | Friendly | 2 | 1 | 1 | 0 | 5 | 2 | +3 | WC: GS 2002 Confed-Cup: GS 2017 |
| Cameroon | CAF | Total | 4 | 3 | 1 | 0 | 10 | 3 | +7 | WC: GS 2002 Confed-Cup: GS 2017 |
| Canada | CONCACAF | Friendly | 2 | 2 | 0 | 0 | 6 | 1 | +5 | |
| Canada | CONCACAF | Total | 2 | 2 | 0 | 0 | 6 | 1 | +5 | |
| Chile | CONMEBOL | Competitive | 5 | 4 | 1 | 0 | 9 | 2 | +7 | WC: GS 1962, 1974, 1982 Confed-Cup: GS 2017, F 2017 |
| Chile | CONMEBOL | Friendly | 4 | 2 | 0 | 2 | 5 | 6 | −1 | WC: GS 1962, 1974, 1982 Confed-Cup: GS 2017, F 2017 |
| Chile | CONMEBOL | Total | 9 | 6 | 1 | 2 | 14 | 8 | +6 | WC: GS 1962, 1974, 1982 Confed-Cup: GS 2017, F 2017 |
| China | AFC | Friendly | 2 | 1 | 1 | 0 | 2 | 1 | +1 | |
| China | AFC | Total | 2 | 1 | 1 | 0 | 2 | 1 | +1 | |
| CIS | UEFA | Competitive | 1 | 0 | 1 | 0 | 1 | 1 | 0 | EC: GS 1992 |
| CIS | UEFA | Total | 1 | 0 | 1 | 0 | 1 | 1 | 0 | EC: GS 1992 |
| Colombia | CONMEBOL | | | | | | | | | |
| Colombia | CONMEBOL | Competitive | 1 | 0 | 1 | 0 | 1 | 1 | 0 | WC: GS 1990 |
| Colombia | CONMEBOL | Friendly | 4 | 2 | 1 | 1 | 9 | 6 | +3 | WC: GS 1990 |
| Colombia | CONMEBOL | Total | 5 | 2 | 2 | 1 | 10 | 7 | +3 | WC: GS 1990 |
| Costa Rica | CONCACAF | Competitive | 2 | 2 | 0 | 0 | 8 | 4 | +4 | WC: GS 2006, 2022 |
| Costa Rica | CONCACAF | Total | 2 | 2 | 0 | 0 | 8 | 4 | +4 | WC: GS 2006, 2022 |
| Croatia | UEFA | | | | | | | | | |
| Croatia | UEFA | Competitive | 3 | 1 | 0 | 2 | 3 | 6 | −3 | WC: QF 1998 EC: QF 1996, GS 2008 |
| Croatia | UEFA | Friendly | 5 | 4 | 1 | 0 | 15 | 4 | +11 | WC: QF 1998 EC: QF 1996, GS 2008 |
| Croatia | UEFA | Total | 8 | 5 | 1 | 2 | 18 | 10 | +8 | WC: QF 1998 EC: QF 1996, GS 2008 |
| Curaçao | CONCACAF | | | | | | | | | |
| Curaçao | CONCACAF | Competitive | 1 | 1 | 0 | 0 | 7 | 1 | +6 | WC: GS 2026 |
| Curaçao | CONCACAF | Friendly | 0 | 0 | 0 | 0 | 0 | 0 | 0 | WC: GS 2026 |
| Curaçao | CONCACAF | Total | 8 | 5 | 1 | 2 | 18 | 10 | +8 | WC: GS 2026 |
| Cyprus | UEFA | Competitive | 6 | 5 | 1 | 0 | 29 | 1 | +28 | WC qualification: 1966, 1970 EC qualification: 2008 |
| Cyprus | UEFA | Total | 6 | 5 | 1 | 0 | 29 | 1 | +28 | WC qualification: 1966, 1970 EC qualification: 2008 |
| Czechoslovakia | UEFA | Competitive | 7 | 3 | 3 | 1 | 14 | 10 | +4 | WC: SF 1934, GS 1958, QF 1990 WC qualification: 1986 EC: F 1976, GS 1980 |
| Czechoslovakia | UEFA | Friendly | 10 | 7 | 1 | 2 | 22 | 14 | +8 | WC: SF 1934, GS 1958, QF 1990 WC qualification: 1986 EC: F 1976, GS 1980 |
| Czechoslovakia | UEFA | Total | 17 | 10 | 4 | 3 | 36 | 24 | +12 | WC: SF 1934, GS 1958, QF 1990 WC qualification: 1986 EC: F 1976, GS 1980 |
| Czech Republic | UEFA | Competitive | 7 | 5 | 0 | 2 | 12 | 8 | +4 | WC qualification: 2018 EC: GS 1996, 2004, F 1996 EC qualification: 2008 |
| Czech Republic | UEFA | Friendly | 2 | 2 | 0 | 0 | 4 | 2 | +2 | WC qualification: 2018 EC: GS 1996, 2004, F 1996 EC qualification: 2008 |
| Czech Republic | UEFA | Total | 9 | 7 | 0 | 2 | 16 | 10 | +6 | WC qualification: 2018 EC: GS 1996, 2004, F 1996 EC qualification: 2008 |
| Denmark | UEFA | | | | | | | | | |
| Denmark | UEFA | Competitive | 5 | 3 | 0 | 2 | 6 | 5 | +1 | WC: GS 1986 EC: GS 1988, 2012, F 1992, R16 2024 |
| Denmark | UEFA | Friendly | 24 | 13 | 5 | 6 | 51 | 33 | +18 | WC: GS 1986 EC: GS 1988, 2012, F 1992, R16 2024 |
| Denmark | UEFA | Total | 29 | 16 | 5 | 8 | 57 | 38 | +19 | WC: GS 1986 EC: GS 1988, 2012, F 1992, R16 2024 |
| East Germany | UEFA | Competitive | 1 | 0 | 0 | 1 | 0 | 1 | −1 | WC: GS 1974 |
| East Germany | UEFA | Total | 1 | 0 | 0 | 1 | 0 | 1 | −1 | WC: GS 1974 |
| Ecuador | CONMEBOL | Competitive | 2 | 1 | 0 | 1 | 4 | 2 | +2 | WC: GS 2026 |
| Ecuador | CONMEBOL | Friendly | 1 | 1 | 0 | 0 | 4 | 2 | +2 | WC: GS 2026 |
| Ecuador | CONMEBOL | Total | 2 | 2 | 0 | 0 | 7 | 2 | +5 | WC: GS 2026 |
| Egypt | CAF | Friendly | 1 | 0 | 0 | 1 | 1 | 2 | −1 | |
| Egypt | CAF | Total | 1 | 0 | 0 | 1 | 1 | 2 | −1 | |
| England (Note: England, Northern Ireland, Scotland and Wales are not sovereign states but part of the United Kingdom, but play in football with their own national teams.) | UEFA | | | | | | | | | |
| England | UEFA | Competitive | 14 | 4 | 6 | 4 | 20 | 22 | −2 | WC: F 1966, QF 1970, 2GS 1982, SF 1990, R16 2010 WC qualification: 2002 EC qualification: 1972 EC: SF 1996, GS 2000, R16 2020 NL: GS 2022/23 |
| England | UEFA | Friendly | 21 | 9 | 2 | 10 | 26 | 35 | −25 | WC: F 1966, QF 1970, 2GS 1982, SF 1990, R16 2010 WC qualification: 2002 EC qualification: 1972 EC: SF 1996, GS 2000, R16 2020 NL: GS 2022/23 |
| England | UEFA | Total | 35 | 13 | 8 | 14 | 46 | 57 | −11 | WC: F 1966, QF 1970, 2GS 1982, SF 1990, R16 2010 WC qualification: 2002 EC qualification: 1972 EC: SF 1996, GS 2000, R16 2020 NL: GS 2022/23 |
| England Amateurs | (Note: The matches against England Amateurs took place before the founding of UEFA.) | Friendly | 4 | 0 | 1 | 3 | 3 | 19 | −16 | |
| England Amateurs | (Note: The matches against England Amateurs took place before the founding of UEFA.) | Total | 4 | 0 | 1 | 3 | 3 | 19 | −16 | |
| Estonia | UEFA | Competitive | 3 | 3 | 0 | 0 | 15 | 1 | +14 | WC qualification: 1938 EC qualification: 2020 |
| Estonia | UEFA | Friendly | 2 | 2 | 0 | 0 | 7 | 0 | +7 | WC qualification: 1938 EC qualification: 2020 |
| Estonia | UEFA | Total | 5 | 5 | 0 | 0 | 22 | 1 | +21 | WC qualification: 1938 EC qualification: 2020 |
| Faroe Islands | UEFA | Competitive | 4 | 4 | 0 | 0 | 10 | 1 | +9 | WC qualification: 2014 EC qualification: 2004 |
| Faroe Islands | UEFA | Total | 4 | 4 | 0 | 0 | 10 | 1 | +9 | WC qualification: 2014 EC qualification: 2004 |
| Finland | UEFA | Competitive | 11 | 7 | 4 | 0 | 33 | 9 | +24 | WC qualification: 1938, 1982, 1990, 2002, 2010 EC qualification: 2000 |
| Finland | UEFA | Friendly | 13 | 10 | 2 | 1 | 53 | 10 | +43 | WC qualification: 1938, 1982, 1990, 2002, 2010 EC qualification: 2000 |
| Finland | UEFA | Total | 23 | 16 | 6 | 1 | 82 | 19 | +63 | WC qualification: 1938, 1982, 1990, 2002, 2010 EC qualification: 2000 |
| France | UEFA | | | | | | | | | |
| France | UEFA | Competitive | 9 | 2 | 2 | 5 | 10 | 16 | −6 | WC: 3rd place 1958, SF 1982, 1986, QF 2014 EC: SF 2016, GS 2020 NL: GS 2018/19, 3rd place 2024/25 |
| France | UEFA | Friendly | 26 | 9 | 6 | 11 | 40 | 37 | +3 | WC: 3rd place 1958, SF 1982, 1986, QF 2014 EC: SF 2016, GS 2020 NL: GS 2018/19, 3rd place 2024/25 |
| France | UEFA | Total | 35 | 11 | 8 | 16 | 50 | 53 | −3 | WC: 3rd place 1958, SF 1982, 1986, QF 2014 EC: SF 2016, GS 2020 NL: GS 2018/19, 3rd place 2024/25 |
| Georgia | UEFA | Competitive | 4 | 4 | 0 | 0 | 10 | 2 | +8 | EC qualification: 1996, 2016 |
| Georgia | UEFA | Friendly | 1 | 1 | 0 | 0 | 2 | 0 | +2 | EC qualification: 1996, 2016 |
| Georgia | UEFA | Total | 5 | 5 | 0 | 0 | 12 | 2 | +10 | EC qualification: 1996, 2016 |
| Ghana | CAF | Competitive | 2 | 1 | 1 | 0 | 3 | 2 | +1 | WC: GS 2010, 2014 |
| Ghana | CAF | Friendly | 3 | 3 | 0 | 0 | 10 | 3 | +7 | WC: GS 2010, 2014 |
| Ghana | CAF | Total | 5 | 4 | 1 | 0 | 13 | 5 | +8 | WC: GS 2010, 2014 |
| Gibraltar | UEFA | Competitive | 2 | 2 | 0 | 0 | 11 | 0 | +11 | EC qualification: 2016 |
| Gibraltar | UEFA | Total | 2 | 2 | 0 | 0 | 11 | 0 | +11 | EC qualification: 2016 |
| Greece | UEFA | Competitive | 10 | 5 | 4 | 1 | 18 | 9 | +9 | WC qualification: 1962, 2002 EC qualification: 1976 EC: GS 1980, QF 2012 NL: GS 2026/27 |
| Greece | UEFA | Friendly | 2 | 2 | 0 | 0 | 5 | 2 | +3 | WC qualification: 1962, 2002 EC qualification: 1976 EC: GS 1980, QF 2012 NL: GS 2026/27 |
| Greece | UEFA | Total | 11 | 7 | 3 | 1 | 23 | 11 | +12 | WC qualification: 1962, 2002 EC qualification: 1976 EC: GS 1980, QF 2012 NL: GS 2026/27 |
| Hungary | UEFA | | | | | | | | | |
| Hungary | UEFA | Competitive | 9 | 3 | 3 | 3 | 18 | 18 | 0 | OG: CT SF 1912 WC: GS 1954, F 1954 EC: GS 2020, 2024 NL: GS 2022/23, 2024/25 |
| Hungary | UEFA | Friendly | 31 | 12 | 10 | 9 | 64 | 51 | +13 | OG: CT SF 1912 WC: GS 1954, F 1954 EC: GS 2020, 2024 NL: GS 2022/23, 2024/25 |
| Hungary | UEFA | Total | 39 | 15 | 12 | 12 | 81 | 68 | +13 | OG: CT SF 1912 WC: GS 1954, F 1954 EC: GS 2020, 2024 NL: GS 2022/23, 2024/25 |
| Iceland | UEFA | Competitive | 4 | 3 | 1 | 0 | 10 | 0 | +10 | EC qualification: 2004 WC qualification: 2022 |
| Iceland | UEFA | Friendly | 2 | 2 | 0 | 0 | 8 | 1 | +7 | EC qualification: 2004 WC qualification: 2022 |
| Iceland | UEFA | Total | 6 | 5 | 1 | 0 | 18 | 1 | +17 | EC qualification: 2004 WC qualification: 2022 |
| Iran | AFC | Competitive | 1 | 1 | 0 | 0 | 2 | 0 | +2 | WC: GS 1998 |
| Iran | AFC | Friendly | 1 | 1 | 0 | 0 | 2 | 0 | +2 | WC: GS 1998 |
| Iran | AFC | Total | 2 | 2 | 0 | 0 | 4 | 0 | +4 | WC: GS 1998 |
| Israel | UEFA | Friendly | 5 | 5 | 0 | 0 | 14 | 1 | +13 | |
| Israel | UEFA | Total | 5 | 5 | 0 | 0 | 14 | 1 | +13 | |
| Italy | UEFA | Competitive | 13 | 2 | 7 | 4 | 18 | 20 | −2 | WC: GS 1962, 2GS 1978, SF 1970, 2006, F 1982 EC: GS 1988, 1996, SF 2012, QF 2016 NL: GS 2022/23, QF 2024/25 |
| Italy | UEFA | Friendly | 26 | 8 | 7 | 11 | 34 | 37 | −3 | WC: GS 1962, 2GS 1978, SF 1970, 2006, F 1982 EC: GS 1988, 1996, SF 2012, QF 2016 NL: GS 2022/23, QF 2024/25 |
| Italy | UEFA | Total | 39 | 10 | 14 | 15 | 52 | 57 | −5 | WC: GS 1962, 2GS 1978, SF 1970, 2006, F 1982 EC: GS 1988, 1996, SF 2012, QF 2016 NL: GS 2022/23, QF 2024/25 |
| Ivory Coast | CAF | | | | | | | | | |
| Ivory Coast | CAF | Competitive | 1 | 1 | 0 | 0 | 2 | 1 | +1 | WC: GS 2026 |
| Friendly | 1 | 0 | 1 | 0 | 2 | 2 | 0 | | | WC: GS 2026 |
| Total | 2 | 1 | 1 | 0 | 4 | 3 | +1 | | | WC: GS 2026 |
| Japan | AFC | | | | | | | | | |
| Japan | AFC | Competitive | 1 | 0 | 0 | 1 | 1 | 2 | −1 | WC: GS 2022 |
| Japan | AFC | Friendly | 3 | 1 | 1 | 1 | 6 | 6 | 0 | WC: GS 2022 |
| Japan | AFC | Total | 4 | 1 | 1 | 2 | 7 | 8 | −1 | WC: GS 2022 |
| Kazakhstan | UEFA | Competitive | 4 | 4 | 0 | 0 | 14 | 1 | +13 | EC qualification: 2012 WC qualification: 2014 |
| Kazakhstan | UEFA | Total | 4 | 4 | 0 | 0 | 14 | 1 | +13 | EC qualification: 2012 WC qualification: 2014 |
| Kuwait | AFC | Friendly | 1 | 1 | 0 | 0 | 7 | 0 | +7 | |
| Kuwait | AFC | Total | 1 | 1 | 0 | 0 | 7 | 0 | +7 | |
| Latvia | UEFA | | | | | | | | | |
| Latvia | UEFA | Competitive | 1 | 0 | 1 | 0 | 0 | 0 | 0 | EC: GS 2004 |
| Latvia | UEFA | Friendly | 3 | 3 | 0 | 0 | 13 | 2 | +11 | EC: GS 2004 |
| Latvia | UEFA | Total | 4 | 3 | 1 | 0 | 13 | 2 | +11 | EC: GS 2004 |
| Liechtenstein | UEFA | Competitive | 4 | 4 | 0 | 0 | 21 | 0 | +21 | WC qualification: 2010, 2022 |
| Liechtenstein | UEFA | Friendly | 2 | 2 | 0 | 0 | 17 | 3 | +14 | WC qualification: 2010, 2022 |
| Liechtenstein | UEFA | Total | 6 | 6 | 0 | 0 | 38 | 3 | +35 | WC qualification: 2010, 2022 |
| Lithuania | UEFA | Competitive | 2 | 1 | 1 | 0 | 3 | 1 | +2 | EC qualification: 2004 |
| Lithuania | UEFA | Total | 2 | 1 | 1 | 0 | 3 | 1 | +2 | EC qualification: 2004 |
| Luxembourg | UEFA | Competitive | 6 | 6 | 0 | 0 | 31 | 3 | +28 | OG: R16 1936 WC qualification: 1934, 2026 EC qualification: 1992 |
| Luxembourg | UEFA | Friendly | 9 | 8 | 0 | 1 | 35 | 8 | +27 | OG: R16 1936 WC qualification: 1934, 2026 EC qualification: 1992 |
| Luxembourg | UEFA | Total | 15 | 14 | 0 | 1 | 66 | 11 | +55 | OG: R16 1936 WC qualification: 1934, 2026 EC qualification: 1992 |
| Malta | UEFA | Competitive | 6 | 5 | 1 | 0 | 26 | 2 | +24 | WC qualification: 1986 EC qualification: 1976, 1980 |
| Malta | UEFA | Friendly | 3 | 3 | 0 | 0 | 12 | 1 | +11 | WC qualification: 1986 EC qualification: 1976, 1980 |
| Malta | UEFA | Total | 9 | 8 | 1 | 0 | 38 | 3 | +35 | WC qualification: 1986 EC qualification: 1976, 1980 |
| Mexico | CONCACAF | Competitive | 6 | 4 | 1 | 1 | 16 | 6 | +10 | WC: GS 1978, 2018, QF 1986, R16 1998 Confed-Cup: 3rd place 2005, SF 2017 |
| Mexico | CONCACAF | Friendly | 7 | 1 | 5 | 1 | 10 | 7 | +3 | WC: GS 1978, 2018, QF 1986, R16 1998 Confed-Cup: 3rd place 2005, SF 2017 |
| Mexico | CONCACAF | Total | 13 | 5 | 6 | 2 | 26 | 13 | +13 | WC: GS 1978, 2018, QF 1986, R16 1998 Confed-Cup: 3rd place 2005, SF 2017 |
| Moldova | UEFA | Competitive | 4 | 4 | 0 | 0 | 18 | 3 | +15 | EC qualification: 1996, 2000 |
| Moldova | UEFA | Total | 4 | 4 | 0 | 0 | 18 | 3 | +15 | EC qualification: 1996, 2000 |
| Morocco | CAF | Competitive | 2 | 2 | 0 | 0 | 3 | 1 | +2 | WC: GS 1970, R16 1986 |
| Morocco | CAF | Friendly | 2 | 2 | 0 | 0 | 9 | 2 | +7 | WC: GS 1970, R16 1986 |
| Morocco | CAF | Total | 4 | 4 | 0 | 0 | 12 | 3 | +9 | WC: GS 1970, R16 1986 |
| Netherlands | UEFA | Competitive | 17 | 6 | 7 | 4 | 26 | 28 | −2 | WC: F 1974, 2GS 1978, R16 1990 WC qualification: 1990 EC: SF 1988, GS 1980, 1992, 2004, 2012 EC qualification: 2020 NL: GS 2018/19, 2024/25, 2026/27 |
| Netherlands | UEFA | Friendly | 32 | 12 | 12 | 8 | 65 | 52 | +13 | WC: F 1974, 2GS 1978, R16 1990 WC qualification: 1990 EC: SF 1988, GS 1980, 1992, 2004, 2012 EC qualification: 2020 NL: GS 2018/19, 2024/25, 2026/27 |
| Netherlands | UEFA | Total | 48 | 18 | 18 | 12 | 90 | 79 | +11 | WC: F 1974, 2GS 1978, R16 1990 WC qualification: 1990 EC: SF 1988, GS 1980, 1992, 2004, 2012 EC qualification: 2020 NL: GS 2018/19, 2024/25, 2026/27 |
| New Zealand | OFC | Competitive | 1 | 1 | 0 | 0 | 2 | 0 | +2 | Confed-Cup: GS 1999 |
| New Zealand | OFC | Total | 1 | 1 | 0 | 0 | 2 | 0 | +2 | Confed-Cup: GS 1999 |
| Nigeria | CAF | Friendly | 1 | 1 | 0 | 0 | 1 | 0 | +1 | |
| Nigeria | CAF | Total | 1 | 1 | 0 | 0 | 1 | 0 | +1 | |
| Northern Ireland | UEFA | Competitive | 16 | 12 | 2 | 2 | 37 | 13 | +24 | WC: GS 1958 WC qualification: 1962, 1998, 2018, 2026 EC qualification: 1984, 2000, 2020 EC: GS 2016 |
| Northern Ireland | UEFA | Friendly | 5 | 3 | 2 | 0 | 13 | 3 | +10 | WC: GS 1958 WC qualification: 1962, 1998, 2018, 2026 EC qualification: 1984, 2000, 2020 EC: GS 2016 |
| Northern Ireland | UEFA | Total | 21 | 15 | 4 | 2 | 50 | 16 | +34 | WC: GS 1958 WC qualification: 1962, 1998, 2018, 2026 EC qualification: 1984, 2000, 2020 EC: GS 2016 |
| Norway | UEFA | Competitive | 5 | 3 | 1 | 1 | 15 | 4 | +11 | OG: QF 1936 WC qualification: 1954, 2018 |
| Norway | UEFA | Friendly | 17 | 12 | 4 | 1 | 44 | 13 | +31 | OG: QF 1936 WC qualification: 1954, 2018 |
| Norway | UEFA | Total | 22 | 15 | 5 | 2 | 59 | 17 | +42 | OG: QF 1936 WC qualification: 1954, 2018 |
| North Macedonia | UEFA | Competitive | 2 | 1 | 0 | 1 | 5 | 2 | +3 | WC qualification: 2022 |
| North Macedonia | UEFA | Total | 2 | 1 | 0 | 1 | 5 | 2 | +3 | WC qualification: 2022 |
| Oman | AFC | Friendly | 2 | 2 | 0 | 0 | 3 | 0 | +3 | |
| Oman | AFC | Total | 2 | 2 | 0 | 0 | 3 | 0 | +3 | |
| Paraguay | CONMEBOL | Competitive | 2 | 1 | 1 | 0 | 2 | 1 | +1 | WC: R16 2002, R32 2026 |
| Paraguay | CONMEBOL | Friendly | 1 | 0 | 1 | 0 | 3 | 3 | 0 | WC: R16 2002, R32 2026 |
| Paraguay | CONMEBOL | Total | 2 | 1 | 1 | 0 | 4 | 3 | +1 | WC: R16 2002, R32 2026 |
| Peru | CONMEBOL | Competitive | 1 | 1 | 0 | 0 | 3 | 1 | +2 | WC: GS 1970 |
| Peru | CONMEBOL | Friendly | 2 | 2 | 0 | 0 | 4 | 1 | +3 | WC: GS 1970 |
| Peru | CONMEBOL | Total | 3 | 3 | 0 | 0 | 7 | 2 | +5 | WC: GS 1970 |
| Poland | UEFA | Competitive | 9 | 5 | 3 | 1 | 10 | 4 | +6 | WC: GS 1978, 2006, 2GS 1974 EC qualification: 1972, 2016 EC: GS 2008, 2016 |
| Poland | UEFA | Friendly | 13 | 8 | 4 | 1 | 24 | 9 | +15 | WC: GS 1978, 2006, 2GS 1974 EC qualification: 1972, 2016 EC: GS 2008, 2016 |
| Poland | UEFA | Total | 22 | 13 | 7 | 2 | 34 | 13 | +21 | WC: GS 1978, 2006, 2GS 1974 EC qualification: 1972, 2016 EC: GS 2008, 2016 |
| Portugal | UEFA | Competitive | 12 | 6 | 3 | 3 | 19 | 13 | +6 | WC qualification: 1986, 1998 WC: 3rd place 2006, GS 2014 EC: GS 1984, 2000, 2012, 2020, QF 2008 NL: SF 2024/25 |
| Portugal | UEFA | Friendly | 8 | 5 | 2 | 1 | 15 | 7 | +8 | WC qualification: 1986, 1998 WC: 3rd place 2006, GS 2014 EC: GS 1984, 2000, 2012, 2020, QF 2008 NL: SF 2024/25 |
| Portugal | UEFA | Total | 20 | 11 | 5 | 4 | 34 | 20 | +14 | WC qualification: 1986, 1998 WC: 3rd place 2006, GS 2014 EC: GS 1984, 2000, 2012, 2020, QF 2008 NL: SF 2024/25 |
| Republic of Ireland | UEFA | Competitive | 7 | 3 | 3 | 1 | 12 | 4 | +8 | WC: GS 2002 EC qualification: 2008, 2016 WC qualification: 2014 |
| Republic of Ireland | UEFA | Friendly | 13 | 6 | 2 | 5 | 23 | 20 | +3 | WC: GS 2002 EC qualification: 2008, 2016 WC qualification: 2014 |
| Republic of Ireland | UEFA | Total | 20 | 9 | 5 | 6 | 35 | 24 | +11 | WC: GS 2002 EC qualification: 2008, 2016 WC qualification: 2014 |
| Romania | UEFA | Competitive | 4 | 3 | 1 | 0 | 6 | 3 | +3 | EC: GS 1984, 2000 WC qualification: 2022 |
| Romania | UEFA | Friendly | 11 | 7 | 2 | 2 | 35 | 16 | +19 | EC: GS 1984, 2000 WC qualification: 2022 |
| Romania | UEFA | Total | 15 | 10 | 3 | 2 | 41 | 19 | +22 | EC: GS 1984, 2000 WC qualification: 2022 |
| Russia | UEFA | Competitive | 4 | 4 | 0 | 0 | 22 | 1 | +21 | OG: CS R1 1912 WC qualification: 2010 EC: GS 1996 |
| Russia | UEFA | Friendly | 3 | 2 | 1 | 0 | 6 | 2 | +4 | OG: CS R1 1912 WC qualification: 2010 EC: GS 1996 |
| Russia | UEFA | Total | 7 | 6 | 1 | 0 | 28 | 3 | +25 | OG: CS R1 1912 WC qualification: 2010 EC: GS 1996 |
| Saar | | Competitive | 2 | 2 | 0 | 0 | 6 | 1 | +5 | WC qualification: 1954 |
| Saar | | Total | 2 | 2 | 0 | 0 | 6 | 1 | +5 | WC qualification: 1954 |
| San Marino | UEFA | Competitive | 4 | 4 | 0 | 0 | 34 | 0 | +34 | EC qualification: 2008 WC qualification: 2018 |
| San Marino | UEFA | Total | 4 | 4 | 0 | 0 | 34 | 0 | +34 | EC qualification: 2008 WC qualification: 2018 |
| Saudi Arabia | AFC | Competitive | 1 | 1 | 0 | 0 | 8 | 0 | +8 | WC: GS 2002 |
| Saudi Arabia | AFC | Friendly | 2 | 2 | 0 | 0 | 5 | 1 | +4 | WC: GS 2002 |
| Saudi Arabia | AFC | Total | 3 | 3 | 0 | 0 | 13 | 1 | +12 | WC: GS 2002 |
| Scotland | UEFA | Competitive | 9 | 7 | 2 | 0 | 21 | 10 | +11 | WC qualification: 1970 WC: GS 1986 EC: GS 1992, 2024 EC qualification: 2004, 2016 |
| Scotland | UEFA | Friendly | 9 | 2 | 3 | 4 | 10 | 14 | −4 | WC qualification: 1970 WC: GS 1986 EC: GS 1992, 2024 EC qualification: 2004, 2016 |
| Scotland | UEFA | Total | 18 | 9 | 5 | 4 | 31 | 24 | +7 | WC qualification: 1970 WC: GS 1986 EC: GS 1992, 2024 EC qualification: 2004, 2016 |
| Serbia | UEFA | | | | | | | | | |
| Serbia | UEFA | Competitive | 2 | 1 | 0 | 1 | 2 | 1 | +1 | WC: GS 2010 |
| Serbia | UEFA | Friendly | 2 | 1 | 1 | 0 | 3 | 2 | +1 | WC: GS 2010 |
| Serbia | UEFA | Total | 3 | 1 | 1 | 1 | 3 | 3 | 0 | WC: GS 2010 |
| Serbia and Montenegro | UEFA | Friendly | 1 | 1 | 0 | 0 | 1 | 0 | +1 | |
| Serbia and Montenegro | UEFA | Total | 1 | 1 | 0 | 0 | 1 | 0 | +1 | |
| Slovakia | UEFA | Competitive | 5 | 4 | 0 | 1 | 15 | 4 | +11 | EC qualification: 2008 WC qualification: 2026 EC: R16 2016 |
| Slovakia | UEFA | Friendly | 8 | 5 | 0 | 3 | 16 | 10 | +6 | EC qualification: 2008 WC qualification: 2026 EC: R16 2016 |
| Slovakia | UEFA | Total | 13 | 9 | 0 | 4 | 31 | 14 | +17 | EC qualification: 2008 WC qualification: 2026 EC: R16 2016 |
| Slovenia | UEFA | Friendly | 1 | 1 | 0 | 0 | 1 | 0 | +1 | |
| Slovenia | UEFA | Total | 1 | 1 | 0 | 0 | 1 | 0 | +1 | |
| South Africa | CAF | Friendly | 4 | 3 | 1 | 0 | 9 | 2 | +7 | |
| South Africa | CAF | Total | 4 | 3 | 1 | 0 | 9 | 2 | +7 | |
| South Korea | AFC | | | | | | | | | |
| South Korea | AFC | Competitive | 3 | 2 | 0 | 1 | 4 | 4 | 0 | WC: GS 1994, 2018, SF 2002 |
| South Korea | AFC | Friendly | 1 | 0 | 0 | 1 | 1 | 3 | −2 | WC: GS 1994, 2018, SF 2002 |
| South Korea | AFC | Total | 4 | 2 | 0 | 2 | 5 | 7 | −2 | WC: GS 1994, 2018, SF 2002 |
| Soviet Union | UEFA | Competitive | 2 | 2 | 0 | 0 | 5 | 1 | +4 | WC: SF 1966 EC: F 1972 |
| Soviet Union | UEFA | Friendly | 10 | 7 | 0 | 3 | 17 | 10 | +7 | WC: SF 1966 EC: F 1972 |
| Soviet Union | UEFA | Total | 12 | 9 | 0 | 3 | 22 | 11 | +11 | WC: SF 1966 EC: F 1972 |
| Spain | UEFA | | | | | | | | | |
| Spain | UEFA | Competitive | 13 | 4 | 4 | 5 | 13 | 17 | −4 | WC: GS 1966, 1994, 2022, 2GS 1982, SF 2010 EC qualification: 1976 EC: GS 1984, 1988, F 2008, QF 2024 NL: GS 2020/21 |
| Spain | UEFA | Friendly | 14 | 5 | 5 | 4 | 19 | 17 | +2 | WC: GS 1966, 1994, 2022, 2GS 1982, SF 2010 EC qualification: 1976 EC: GS 1984, 1988, F 2008, QF 2024 NL: GS 2020/21 |
| Spain | UEFA | Total | 27 | 9 | 9 | 9 | 32 | 34 | −2 | WC: GS 1966, 1994, 2022, 2GS 1982, SF 2010 EC qualification: 1976 EC: GS 1984, 1988, F 2008, QF 2024 NL: GS 2020/21 |
| Sweden | UEFA | Competitive | 13 | 9 | 3 | 1 | 35 | 20 | +15 | WC: QF 1934, SF 1958, 2GS 1974, R16 2006, GS 2018 WC qualification: 1938, 1966, 1986, 2014 EC: SF 1992 |
| Sweden | UEFA | Friendly | 24 | 7 | 6 | 11 | 37 | 41 | −4 | WC: QF 1934, SF 1958, 2GS 1974, R16 2006, GS 2018 WC qualification: 1938, 1966, 1986, 2014 EC: SF 1992 |
| Sweden | UEFA | Total | 37 | 16 | 9 | 12 | 72 | 61 | +11 | WC: QF 1934, SF 1958, 2GS 1974, R16 2006, GS 2018 WC qualification: 1938, 1966, 1986, 2014 EC: SF 1992 |
| Switzerland | UEFA | Competitive | 8 | 3 | 4 | 1 | 19 | 11 | +8 | OG: R16 1928 WC: R16 1938 (x2), GS 1962, 1966 EC: GS 2024 NL: GS 2020/21 |
| Switzerland | UEFA | Friendly | 47 | 34 | 5 | 8 | 128 | 62 | +66 | OG: R16 1928 WC: R16 1938 (x2), GS 1962, 1966 EC: GS 2024 NL: GS 2020/21 |
| Switzerland | UEFA | Total | 55 | 37 | 9 | 9 | 147 | 73 | +74 | OG: R16 1928 WC: R16 1938 (x2), GS 1962, 1966 EC: GS 2024 NL: GS 2020/21 |
| Thailand | AFC | Friendly | 1 | 1 | 0 | 0 | 5 | 1 | +4 | |
| Thailand | AFC | Total | 1 | 1 | 0 | 0 | 5 | 1 | +4 | |
| Tunisia | CAF | Competitive | 2 | 1 | 1 | 0 | 3 | 0 | +3 | WC: GS 1978 Confed-Cup: GS 2005 |
| Tunisia | CAF | Friendly | 1 | 0 | 1 | 0 | 1 | 1 | 0 | WC: GS 1978 Confed-Cup: GS 2005 |
| Tunisia | CAF | Total | 3 | 1 | 2 | 0 | 4 | 1 | +3 | WC: GS 1978 Confed-Cup: GS 2005 |
| Turkey | UEFA | Competitive | 13 | 9 | 3 | 1 | 34 | 9 | +25 | WC: GS 1954 (x2) EC qualification: 1972, 1980, 1984, 2000, 2012 EC: SF 2008 |
| Turkey | UEFA | Friendly | 9 | 5 | 1 | 3 | 20 | 10 | +10 | WC: GS 1954 (x2) EC qualification: 1972, 1980, 1984, 2000, 2012 EC: SF 2008 |
| Turkey | UEFA | Total | 22 | 14 | 4 | 4 | 54 | 19 | +35 | WC: GS 1954 (x2) EC qualification: 1972, 1980, 1984, 2000, 2012 EC: SF 2008 |
| Ukraine | UEFA | Competitive | 7 | 5 | 2 | 0 | 14 | 4 | +10 | WC qualification: 1998, 2002 EC: GS 2016 NL: GS 2020/21 |
| Ukraine | UEFA | Friendly | 3 | 0 | 3 | 0 | 6 | 6 | 0 | WC qualification: 1998, 2002 EC: GS 2016 NL: GS 2020/21 |
| Ukraine | UEFA | Total | 10 | 5 | 5 | 0 | 20 | 10 | +10 | WC qualification: 1998, 2002 EC: GS 2016 NL: GS 2020/21 |
| United Arab Emirates | AFC | Competitive | 1 | 1 | 0 | 0 | 5 | 1 | +4 | WC: GS 1990 |
| United Arab Emirates | AFC | Friendly | 2 | 2 | 0 | 0 | 9 | 2 | +7 | WC: GS 1990 |
| United Arab Emirates | AFC | Total | 3 | 3 | 0 | 0 | 14 | 3 | +11 | WC: GS 1990 |
| United States | CONCACAF | Competitive | 4 | 3 | 0 | 1 | 4 | 2 | +2 | WC: GS 1998, 2014, QF 2002 Confed-Cup: GS 1999 |
| United States | CONCACAF | Friendly | 9 | 6 | 0 | 3 | 24 | 17 | +7 | WC: GS 1998, 2014, QF 2002 Confed-Cup: GS 1999 |
| United States | CONCACAF | Total | 12 | 8 | 0 | 4 | 26 | 18 | +8 | WC: GS 1998, 2014, QF 2002 Confed-Cup: GS 1999 |
| Uruguay | CONMEBOL | Competitive | 5 | 3 | 1 | 1 | 10 | 7 | +3 | OG: QF 1928 WC: QF 1966, 3rd place 1970, 2010, GS 1986 |
| Uruguay | CONMEBOL | Friendly | 6 | 5 | 1 | 0 | 19 | 5 | +14 | OG: QF 1928 WC: QF 1966, 3rd place 1970, 2010, GS 1986 |
| Uruguay | CONMEBOL | Total | 11 | 8 | 2 | 1 | 29 | 12 | +17 | OG: QF 1928 WC: QF 1966, 3rd place 1970, 2010, GS 1986 |
| Wales | UEFA | Competitive | 12 | 8 | 3 | 1 | 21 | 6 | +15 | WC qualification: 1990, 2010 EC qualification: 1980, 1992, 1996, 2008 |
| Wales | UEFA | Friendly | 5 | 1 | 3 | 1 | 5 | 4 | +1 | WC qualification: 1990, 2010 EC qualification: 1980, 1992, 1996, 2008 |
| Wales | UEFA | Total | 17 | 9 | 6 | 2 | 26 | 10 | +16 | WC qualification: 1990, 2010 EC qualification: 1980, 1992, 1996, 2008 |
| Yugoslavia (Note: Incl. of the match against the BR Yugoslavia at the 1998 World Cup.) | UEFA | Competitive | 9 | 6 | 1 | 2 | 18 | 8 | +10 | WC: QF 1954, 1958, 1962, 2GS 1974, GS 1990, 1998 EC qualification: 1968 EC: SF 1976 |
| Yugoslavia | UEFA | Friendly | 16 | 8 | 3 | 5 | 28 | 23 | +5 | WC: QF 1954, 1958, 1962, 2GS 1974, GS 1990, 1998 EC qualification: 1968 EC: SF 1976 |
| Yugoslavia | UEFA | Total | 25 | 14 | 4 | 7 | 46 | 31 | +15 | WC: QF 1954, 1958, 1962, 2GS 1974, GS 1990, 1998 EC qualification: 1968 EC: SF 1976 |
Total
| Total | | All competitive | 436 | 284 | 87 | 65 | 1,052 | 414 | +638 | |
| Total | | All friendlies | 605 | 319 | 128 | 159 | 1,291 | 808 | +483 | |
| Total | | Total | 1,046 | 603 | 217 | 225 | 2,348 | 1,227 | +1,121 | |

- green background = positive balance (number of wins higher than that of defeats)
- yellow background = balance balanced (number of wins as high as that of defeats)
- red background = balance negative (number of defeats higher than the wins)

== Venues ==
Germany hosted the World Cup in 1974 and 2006, the European Championship in 1988 and 2024, the Confederations Cup in 2005, and the Nations League Finals in 2025. The matches played in the context of these tournaments of the Germany national team count as home matches, the matches against tournament hosts accordingly as away matches. Likewise, the international matches in Vienna after Anschluss Austria, more specifically the three matches from the years 1940, 1941 and 1942, count below as home matches. The meeting in Saarbrücken against the Saarland in the context of 1954 World Cup qualification counts as an away match.

| Venue | Pld | W | D | L | GF | GA | GD |
|---|---|---|---|---|---|---|---|
| Home | 462 | 286 | 94 | 82 | 1,186 | 495 | +691 |
| Away | 411 | 222 | 85 | 104 | 814 | 521 | +293 |
| Neutral | 160 | 88 | 35 | 37 | 320 | 199 | +121 |
| Total | 1,033 | 596 | 215 | 223 | 2,320 | 1,215 | +1,105 |

=== Home venues ===
| Rank | City | Pld | W | D | L | GF | GA | GD | First match | Last match | Next match | Notes |
|---|---|---|---|---|---|---|---|---|---|---|---|---|
| 1 | Berlin | 47 | 18 | 15 | 14 | 92 | 81 | +11 | 20 April 1908 | 18 November 2023 | | First home match, first home defeat, biggest home defeat, first match in front of at least 100,000 spectators (105,000) |
| 2 | Stuttgart | 37 | 22 | 5 | 10 | 83 | 39 | +24 | 26 March 1911 | 8 June 2025 | 30 March 2026 | Match in front of at least 100,000 spectators (102,000) |
| 3 | Hamburg | 35 | 20 | 6 | 9 | 55 | 29 | +26 | 29 October 1911 | 8 October 2021 | | Only match against East Germany |
| 4 | Munich | 32 | 16 | 7 | 9 | 63 | 40 | +23 | 17 December 1911 | 4 June 2025 | | Venue of 1974 WC Final |
| 5 | Cologne | 30 | 19 | 8 | 3 | 83 | 27 | +56 | 20 November 1927 | 7 September 2025 | | |
| 6 | Düsseldorf | 28 | 16 | 6 | 6 | 68 | 32 | +36 | 18 April 1926 | 7 September 2024 | | |
| 7 | Hannover | 27 | 21 | 3 | 3 | 62 | 22 | +40 | 27 September 1931 | 11 October 2016 | | |
| 8 | Frankfurt | 27 | 17 | 7 | 3 | 58 | 29 | +29 | 26 March 1922 | 23 June 2024 | | |
| 9 | Dortmund | 23 | 18 | 4 | 1 | 74 | 18 | +56 | 8 May 1935 | 23 March 2025 | | |
| 10 | Nuremberg | 23 | 14 | 7 | 2 | 60 | 25 | +35 | 13 January 1924 | 3 June 2024 | | |
| 11 | Gelsenkirchen | 19 | 10 | 6 | 3 | 32 | 19 | +13 | 13 October 1973 | 20 June 2023 | | |
| 12 | Leipzig | 14 | 12 | 0 | 2 | 49 | 11 | +38 | 17 November 1912 | 17 November 2025 | | Biggest home win |
| 13 | Bremen | 11 | 5 | 4 | 2 | 24 | 11 | +13 | 23 May 1939 | 12 June 2023 | | |
| 14 | Kaiserslautern | 10 | 5 | 4 | 1 | 27 | 13 | +14 | 27 April 1988 | 8 October 2017 | | 1,000th goal in a home match, scored by Marco Reus |
| 15 | Mönchengladbach | 9 | 6 | 2 | 1 | 22 | 9 | +13 | 8 June 2005 | 7 June 2024 | | |
| 16 | Leverkusen | 8 | 7 | 1 | 0 | 30 | 8 | +22 | 18 December 1991 | 8 June 2018 | | |
| 17 | Karlsruhe | 7 | 7 | 0 | 0 | 25 | 2 | +23 | 4 April 1909 | 13 October 1993 | | |
| 18 | Dresden | 7 | 2 | 3 | 2 | 14 | 13 | +1 | 10 September 1911 | 14 October 1992 | | |
| 19 | Freiburg | 6 | 5 | 0 | 1 | 37 | 4 | +33 | 18 May 1913 | 16 November 2024 | | |
| 20 | Duisburg | 6 | 2 | 0 | 4 | 12 | 8 | +4 | 16 May 1910 | 31 March 2021 | | |
| 21 | Augsburg | 5 | 4 | 0 | 1 | 15 | 6 | +9 | 9 November 1952 | 29 May 2016 | | |
| 22 | Breslau (now Wrocław) (Note: Breslau is now a city of Poland called Wrocław.) | 5 | 3 | 2 | 0 | 18 | 5 | +13 | 2 November 1930 | 7 December 1941 | | |
| 23 | Sinsheim | 4 | 4 | 0 | 0 | 10 | 2 | +8 | 29 May 2011 | 10 October 2025 | | |
| 24 | Ludwigshafen | 4 | 3 | 0 | 1 | 9 | 7 | +2 | 21 December 1952 | 1 June 1966 | | |
| 25 | Bochum | 4 | 2 | 2 | 0 | 14 | 3 | +11 | 2 July 1922 | 14 April 1993 | | |
| 26 | Wolfsburg | 4 | 2 | 1 | 1 | 15 | 6 | +9 | 1 June 2003 | 9 September 2023 | | |
| 27 | Mannheim | 3 | 3 | 0 | 0 | 23 | 2 | +21 | 10 February 1929 | 5 June 1998 | | |
| 28 | Mainz | 3 | 3 | 0 | 0 | 16 | 1 | +15 | 6 June 2014 | 25 March 2023 | 31 May 2026 | |
| 29 | Altona-Hamburg (Note: Altona was an independent city until 1937, before merging with Hamburg.) | 3 | 3 | 0 | 0 | 15 | 2 | +13 | 23 October 1927 | 21 November 1937 | | |
| 30 | Vienna (Note: Vienna is now a city of Austria.) | 3 | 1 | 0 | 2 | 7 | 5 | +2 | 14 April 1940 | 1 February 1942 | | |
| 31 | Essen | 2 | 2 | 0 | 0 | 16 | 1 | +15 | 23 December 1951 | 21 May 1969 | | |
| 32 | Saarbrücken | 2 | 2 | 0 | 0 | 8 | 1 | +7 | 20 November 1983 | 27 March 1985 | | |
| 33 | Königsberg (now Kaliningrad) (Note: Königsberg is now a city of Russia called Kaliningrad.) | 2 | 2 | 0 | 0 | 7 | 1 | +6 | 13 October 1935 | 29 August 1937 | | |
| 34 | Chemnitz | 2 | 2 | 0 | 0 | 7 | 2 | +5 | 18 September 1938 | 3 December 1939 | | |
| 35 | Rostock | 2 | 2 | 0 | 0 | 6 | 2 | +4 | 27 March 2002 | 7 October 2006 | | |
| 36 | Beuthen (now Bytom) (Note: Beuthen is now a city of Poland called Bytom.) | 1 | 1 | 0 | 0 | 7 | 0 | +7 | 16 August 1942 | 16 August 1942 | | |
| 37 | Krefeld | 1 | 1 | 0 | 0 | 7 | 2 | +5 | 27 September 1936 | 27 September 1936 | | |
| 38 | Stettin (now Szczecin) (Note: Stettin is now a city of Poland called Szczecin.) | 1 | 1 | 0 | 0 | 5 | 0 | +5 | 15 September 1935 | 15 September 1935 | | |
| 39 | Aachen | 1 | 1 | 0 | 0 | 3 | 0 | +3 | 13 May 2010 | 13 May 2010 | | |
| 40 | Erfurt | 1 | 1 | 0 | 0 | 4 | 2 | +2 | 25 August 1935 | 25 August 1935 | | |
| 41 | Wuppertal | 1 | 1 | 0 | 0 | 2 | 1 | +1 | 20 March 1938 | 20 March 1938 | | |
| 42 | Magdeburg | 1 | 0 | 1 | 0 | 2 | 2 | 0 | 5 November 1933 | 5 November 1933 | | |
| 43 | Kleve | 1 | 0 | 0 | 1 | 1 | 2 | −1 | 16 October 1910 | 16 October 1910 | | |
| Total | | 462 | 286 | 94 | 82 | 1,186 | 495 | +691 | 20 April 1908 | 17 November 2025 | 30 March 2026 | |

== Competition records ==
=== FIFA World Cup ===
| FIFA World Cup record | | | | | | | | | Qualification record | | | | | |
| Year | Round | Position | Pld | W | D* | L | GF | GA | Pld | W | D | L | GF | GA |
|---|---|---|---|---|---|---|---|---|---|---|---|---|---|---|
| (Uruguay) 1930 | Did not enter | | | | | | | | Declined participation | | | | | |
| (Italy) 1934 | Third place | 3rd | 4 | 3 | 0 | 1 | 11 | 8 | 1 | 1 | 0 | 0 | 9 | 1 |
| (France) 1938 | First round | 10th | 2 | 0 | 1 | 1 | 3 | 5 | 3 | 3 | 0 | 0 | 11 | 1 |
| (Brazil) 1950 | Banned | | | | | | | | Banned | | | | | |
| (Switzerland) 1954 | Champions | 1st | 6 | 5 | 0 | 1 | 25 | 14 | 4 | 3 | 1 | 0 | 12 | 3 |
| (Sweden) 1958 | Fourth place | 4th | 6 | 2 | 2 | 2 | 12 | 14 | Qualified as defending champions | | | | | |
| (Chile) 1962 | Quarter-finals | 7th | 4 | 2 | 1 | 1 | 4 | 2 | 4 | 4 | 0 | 0 | 11 | 5 |
| (England) 1966 | Runners-up | 2nd | 6 | 4 | 1 | 1 | 15 | 6 | 4 | 3 | 1 | 0 | 14 | 2 |
| (Mexico) 1970 | Third place | 3rd | 6 | 5 | 0 | 1 | 17 | 10 | 6 | 5 | 1 | 0 | 20 | 3 |
| (West Germany) 1974 | Champions | 1st | 7 | 6 | 0 | 1 | 13 | 4 | Qualified as hosts | | | | | |
| (Argentina) 1978 | Second group stage | 6th | 6 | 1 | 4 | 1 | 10 | 5 | Qualified as defending champions | | | | | |
| (Spain) 1982 | Runners-up | 2nd | 7 | 3 | 2 | 2 | 12 | 10 | 8 | 8 | 0 | 0 | 33 | 3 |
| (Mexico) 1986 | Runners-up | 2nd | 7 | 3 | 2 | 2 | 8 | 7 | 8 | 5 | 2 | 1 | 22 | 9 |
| (Italy) 1990 | Champions | 1st | 7 | 5 | 2 | 0 | 15 | 5 | 6 | 3 | 3 | 0 | 13 | 3 |
| (United States) 1994 | Quarter-finals | 5th | 5 | 3 | 1 | 1 | 9 | 7 | Qualified as defending champions | | | | | |
| (France) 1998 | Quarter-finals | 7th | 5 | 3 | 1 | 1 | 8 | 6 | 10 | 6 | 4 | 0 | 23 | 9 |
| (South Korea) (Japan) 2002 | Runners-up | 2nd | 7 | 5 | 1 | 1 | 14 | 3 | 10 | 6 | 3 | 1 | 19 | 12 |
| (Germany) 2006 | Third place | 3rd | 7 | 5 | 1 | 1 | 14 | 6 | Qualified as hosts | | | | | |
| (South Africa) 2010 | Third place | 3rd | 7 | 5 | 0 | 2 | 16 | 5 | 10 | 8 | 2 | 0 | 26 | 5 |
| (Brazil) 2014 | Champions | 1st | 7 | 6 | 1 | 0 | 18 | 4 | 10 | 9 | 1 | 0 | 36 | 10 |
| (Russia) 2018 | Group stage | 22nd | 3 | 1 | 0 | 2 | 2 | 4 | 10 | 10 | 0 | 0 | 43 | 4 |
| (Qatar) 2022 | Group stage | 17th | 3 | 1 | 1 | 1 | 6 | 5 | 10 | 9 | 0 | 1 | 36 | 4 |
| (Canada) (Mexico) (United States) 2026 | Qualified | | | | | | | | 6 | 5 | 0 | 1 | 16 | 3 |
| Total | 4 Titles | 21/23 | 112 | 68 | 21* | 23 | 232 | 130 | 110 | 88 | 18 | 4 | 344 | 77 |

*Denotes draws include knockout matches decided via penalty shoot-out.
**Gold background colour indicates that the tournament was won.
***Red border colour indicates tournament was held on home soil.

=== UEFA European Championship ===
| UEFA European Championship record | | | | | | | | | | Qualification record | | | | | | |
| Year | Round | Position | Pld | W | D* | L | GF | GA | Squad | Pld | W | D | L | GF | GA | Campaign |
|---|---|---|---|---|---|---|---|---|---|---|---|---|---|---|---|---|
| (France) 1960 | Did not enter | | | | | | | | | Did not enter | | | | | | |
| (Spain) 1964 | Did not enter | | | | | | | | | Did not enter | | | | | | |
| (Italy) 1968 | Did not qualify | | | | | | | | | 4 | 2 | 1 | 1 | 9 | 2 | 1968 |
| (Belgium) 1972 | Champions | 1st | 2 | 2 | 0 | 0 | 5 | 1 | Squad | 8 | 5 | 3 | 0 | 13 | 3 | 1972 |
| (Socialist Federal Republic of Yugoslavia) 1976 | Runners-up | 2nd | 2 | 1 | 1* | 0 | 6 | 4 | Squad | 8 | 4 | 4 | 0 | 17 | 5 | 1976 |
| (Italy) 1980 | Champions | 1st | 4 | 3 | 1 | 0 | 6 | 3 | Squad | 6 | 4 | 2 | 0 | 17 | 1 | 1980 |
| (France) 1984 | Group stage | 5th | 3 | 1 | 1 | 1 | 2 | 2 | Squad | 8 | 5 | 1 | 2 | 15 | 5 | 1984 |
| (West Germany) 1988 | Semi-finals | 3rd | 4 | 2 | 1 | 1 | 6 | 3 | Squad | Qualified as hosts | | | | | | |
| (Sweden) 1992 | Runners-up | 2nd | 5 | 2 | 1 | 2 | 7 | 8 | Squad | 6 | 5 | 0 | 1 | 13 | 4 | 1992 |
| (England) 1996 | Champions | 1st | 6 | 4 | 2* | 0 | 10 | 3 | Squad | 10 | 8 | 1 | 1 | 27 | 10 | 1996 |
| (Belgium) (Netherlands) 2000 | Group stage | 15th | 3 | 0 | 1 | 2 | 1 | 5 | Squad | 8 | 6 | 1 | 1 | 20 | 4 | 2000 |
| (Portugal) 2004 | Group stage | 12th | 3 | 0 | 2 | 1 | 2 | 3 | Squad | 8 | 5 | 3 | 0 | 13 | 4 | 2004 |
| (Austria) (Switzerland) 2008 | Runners-up | 2nd | 6 | 4 | 0 | 2 | 10 | 7 | Squad | 12 | 8 | 3 | 1 | 35 | 7 | 2008 |
| (Poland) (Ukraine) 2012 | Semi-finals | 3rd | 5 | 4 | 0 | 1 | 10 | 6 | Squad | 10 | 10 | 0 | 0 | 34 | 7 | 2012 |
| (France) 2016 | Semi-finals | 3rd | 6 | 3 | 2* | 1 | 7 | 3 | Squad | 10 | 7 | 1 | 2 | 24 | 9 | 2016 |
| (Europe) 2020 | Round of 16 | 15th | 4 | 1 | 1 | 2 | 6 | 7 | Squad | 8 | 7 | 0 | 1 | 30 | 7 | 2020 |
| (Germany) 2024 | Quarter-finals | 5th | 5 | 3 | 1 | 1 | 11 | 4 | Squad | Qualified as hosts | | | | | | |
| (United Kingdom) (Republic of Ireland) 2028 | To be determined | | | | | | | | | To be determined | | | | | | |
| Total | 3 Titles | 14/17 | 58 | 30 | 14* | 14 | 89 | 59 | — | 106 | 76 | 20 | 10 | 267 | 68 | Total |

*Denotes draws include knockout matches decided via penalty shoot-out.
**Gold background colour indicates that the tournament was won.
***Red border colour indicates tournament was held on home soil.

=== FIFA Confederations Cup ===
FIFA Confederations Cup record
| Year | Round | Position | Pld | W | D* | L | GF | GA | Squad |
|---|---|---|---|---|---|---|---|---|---|
| (Saudi Arabia) 1992 | Did not enter | | | | | | | | |
| (Saudi Arabia) 1995 | Did not qualify | | | | | | | | |
| (Saudi Arabia) 1997 | Did not enter | | | | | | | | |
| (Mexico) 1999 | Group stage | 5th | 3 | 1 | 0 | 2 | 2 | 6 | Squad |
| (South Korea) (Japan) 2001 | Did not qualify | | | | | | | | |
| (France) 2003 | Did not enter | | | | | | | | |
| (Germany) 2005 | Third place | 3rd | 5 | 3 | 1 | 1 | 15 | 11 | Squad |
| (South Africa) 2009 | Did not qualify | | | | | | | | |
| (Brazil) 2013 | Did not qualify | | | | | | | | |
| (Russia) 2017 | Champions | 1st | 5 | 4 | 1 | 0 | 12 | 5 | Squad |
| Total | 1 Title | 3/10 | 13 | 8 | 2 | 3 | 29 | 22 | — |

*Denotes draws including knockout matches decided via penalty shoot-out.
**Gold background colour indicates that the tournament was won.
***Red border colour indicates tournament was held on home soil.

Note All tournaments from 1950 to 1990 inclusively were competed as West Germany.

=== UEFA Nations League ===
UEFA Nations League record
| Season | Division | Round | RK | Pld | W | D* | L | GF | GA |
|---|---|---|---|---|---|---|---|---|---|
| (Portugal) 2018–19 | A | Group stage | 11th | 4 | 0 | 2 | 2 | 3 | 7 |
| (Italy) 2020–21 | A | Group stage | 8th | 6 | 2 | 3 | 1 | 10 | 13 |
| (Netherlands) 2022–23 | A | Group stage | 10th | 6 | 1 | 4 | 1 | 11 | 9 |
| (Germany) 2024–25 | A | Fourth place | 4th | 10 | 5 | 3 | 2 | 24 | 12 |
| Total | | Fourth place | 4/4 | 26 | 8 | 12 | 6 | 48 | 41 |

*Denotes draws including knockout matches decided via penalty shoot-out.
**Gold background colour indicates that the tournament was won.
***Red border colour indicates tournament was held on home soil.

== Men's honours ==
=== Major competitions ===
FIFA World Cup

- Champions (4): 1954, 1974, 1990, 2014
- Runners-up (4): 1966, 1982, 1986, 2002
- Third place (4): 1934, 1970, 2006, 2010
- Fourth place (1): 1958

UEFA European Championship

- Champions (3): 1972, 1980, 1996
- Runners-up (3): 1976, 1992, 2008
- Semi-finals (3): 1988, 2012, 2016

Summer Olympic Games

- Gold Medal (1): 1976
- Silver Medal (2): 1980, 2016
- Bronze Medal (3): 1964, 1972, 1988
- Fourth place (1): 1952

FIFA Confederations Cup

- Champions (1): 2017
- Third place (1): 2005

UEFA Nations League

- Fourth place (1): 2025

Overview
| Event | 1st place | 2nd place | 3rd place | 4th place |
|---|---|---|---|---|
| FIFA World Cup | 4 | 4 | 4 | 1 |
| UEFA European Championship | 3 | 3 | 3 | x |
| Summer Olympic Games | 1 | 2 | 3 | 1 |
| FIFA Confederations Cup | 1 | 0 | 1 | 0 |
| UEFA Nations League | 0 | 0 | 0 | 1 |
| Total | 9 | 9 | 11 | 3 |

== Women's honours ==
=== Major competitions ===
FIFA Women's World Cup

- Champions (2): 2003, 2007
- Runners-up (1): 1995
- Fourth place (2): 1991, 2015

UEFA Women's Championship

- Champions (8): 1989, 1991, 1995, 1997, 2001, 2005, 2009, 2013
- Runners-up (1): 2022
- Fourth place (1): 1993

Summer Olympic Games

- Gold Medal (1): 2016
- Bronze Medal (4): 2000, 2004, 2008, 2024

UEFA Women's Nations League

- Third place (1): 2024

Overview
| Event | 1st place | 2nd place | 3rd place | 4th place |
|---|---|---|---|---|
| FIFA Women's World Cup | 2 | 1 | 0 | 2 |
| UEFA Women's Championship | 8 | 1 | 0 | 1 |
| Summer Olympic Games | 1 | 0 | 4 | 0 |
| UEFA Women's Nations League | 0 | 0 | 1 | 0 |
| Total | 11 | 2 | 5 | 3 |
