= Christian Schmidt (disambiguation) =

Christian Schmidt (born 1957) is a German politician.

Christian Schmidt may also refer to:

- Christian Schmidt (1833–1894), German-American brewer, namesake of the Christian Schmidt Brewing Company
- Christian Schmidt (footballer) (1888–1917), German footballer
- Christian Martin Schmidt (1942–2024), German musicologist and music theorist
- Christian Schmidt (Klopfer) (born 1980), German writer and editor
