= Leip =

Leip is a surname. Notable people with the surname include

- Ed Leip (1910–1983), American baseball player
- Hans Leip (1893–1983), German novelist, poet and playwright
- Rudolf Leip (1890 –1947), German footballer

== See also ==
- Dave Leip's Atlas of U.S. Presidential Elections, American political website
