= Karl Tewes =

German footballer

Personal information
- Date of birth: 18 August 1886
- Date of death: 7 September 1968 (aged 82)
- Position: Midfielder

Youth career
- Askania Berlin

Senior career*
Years	Team	Apps	(Gls)
1913–1914	Norden-Nordwest Berlin		
1914–1923	BFC Viktoria 1889		
1923–1927	Hertha BSC		

International career
1920–1922	Germany	6	(0)
- * Club domestic league appearances and goals

Karl Tewes (18 August 1886 – 7 September 1968) was a German international footballer.
