= Willy Baumgärtner =

German footballer

Personal information
- Date of birth: 23 December 1890
- Place of birth: Berlin, Germany
- Date of death: 16 November 1953 (aged 62)
- Place of death: São Paulo, Brazil
- Position: Left wing

Senior career*
Years	Team	Apps	(Gls)
1905–1907	BFC Germania 1888		
1907–1923	Düsseldorfer SV 04		

International career
1908–1909	Germany	4	(0)
- * Club domestic league appearances and goals

Willy Baumgärtner (23 December 1890 – 6 November 1953) was a German international footballer. At age 17 years and 104 days, he is the youngest ever player on the German national side. With his four matches for Germany, he was the record holder from 16 March 1909 to 24 April 1910.
