= Christian Schmidt (Klopfer) =

German author

- Born: 14 February 1980 (age 46); Frankfurt (Oder), German Democratic Republic
- Education: University of Potsdam; Humboldt University of Berlin
- Occupations: writer; editor
- Writing career
- Pen name: Klopfer
- Language: German
- Years active: 1999–present
- Website: klopfers-web.de

Christian Schmidt (born 14 February 1980 in Frankfurt (Oder)), known as Klopfer, is a German writer and editor.

== Biography ==
Schmidt was born in 1980 to a teacher and a technician. Growing up in the German Democratic Republic, he was a Young Pioneer. He adopted the name Klopfer (English: Thumper) after the Bambi character, as both Christian and Schmidt are among the most common names in Germany. Since 2016, his pseudonym is officially recognised.

After completing his Abitur in 1999, Schmidt studied computer science at the University of Potsdam from 1999 until 2004. At the Humboldt University of Berlin, he studied Japanese studies from 2004 until 2005 and German studies from 2005 until 2010.

From 2000 until 2016, Schmidt maintained the Manga and Anime online database Animestreet. In 1999, he opened a personal website which he named Klopfers Web in 2002. Among other texts, he writes columns for Klopfers Web, and has released two volumes of collected columns in printed form. For his high degree of communication with his readers through his website, he has been described as an "Author 2.0".

Since 2002, Schmidt works for the manga publishers Egmont Manga & Anime and Tokyopop. He wrote articles for the magazines Manga Power (2002–2004) and Manga Twister (2003–2006) and edits German translations of manga series, among them Detective Conan, Inuyasha and Mirai Nikki.

== Selected work ==
=== Authored ===
- Böses Hasi! Die besten Texte von Klopfers Web. 2007. ISBN 978-3-8370-1078-7.
- Mein Weg zur Weltherrschaft - Phase 2. 2011. ISBN 978-3-8423-4451-8.
- Sexpanzer und Babytod - Wie wir uns manipulieren lassen. 2011. ISBN 978-3-8423-4425-9.
- Braindead Love - Teil 1: Breakfast. 2012. ISBN 978-1-4812-5180-8.
- Bob & Linda: Ein tödlicher Fall. 2020. ISBN 978-3-9822684-0-8.

=== Edited ===
- 07-Ghost
- A.I. Love You
- Ai Yori Aoshi
- Akuma no Riddle
- Another
- Armed Girl's Machiavellism
- Basara
- Best Selection – Yuu Watase
- Big Order
- Corpse Party
- Danganronpa: The Animation
- Darwin's Game
- Detective Conan
- Dog & Scissors
- Durarara!!
- Inuyasha
- Kagerou Daze
- Knights of Sidonia
- Kodomo no Omocha
- Kyokai no Rinne
- Mirai Nikki
- Oh! My Goddess
- Perfect Girl
- Pet Shop of Horrors
- Rurouni Kenshin: Cinema Edition
- Saint Young Men
- Sankarea
- Shakugan no Shana
- Shi Ki
- Taboo Tattoo
- The Testament of Sister New Devil
- Zero's Tea Time
