= Christian Schmidt (footballer) =

German footballer

Personal information
- Date of birth: 9 June 1888
- Date of death: 19 March 1917 (aged 28)
- Position: Goalkeeper

Senior career*
Years	Team	Apps	(Gls)
- Concordia 95 Berlin
- Stuttgarter Kickers

International career
1910–1913	Germany	3	(0)
- * Club domestic league appearances and goals

Christian Schmidt (9 June 1888 – 19 March 1917) was a German international footballer.
