= Rudolf Leip =

German footballer

Personal information
- Date of birth: 8 June 1890
- Date of death: 5 March 1947 (aged 56)
- Position: Forward

Senior career*
Years	Team	Apps	(Gls)
- Guts Muts Dresden

International career
1923–1924	Germany	3	(0)
- * Club domestic league appearances and goals

Rudolf Leip (8 June 1890 – 5 March 1947) was a German international footballer.
