= 2020–21 Stade Malherbe Caen season =

Caen
2020–21 season
- Chairman: Olivier Pickeu
- Manager: Pascal Dupraz; Fabrice Vandeputte
- Stadium: Stade Michel d'Ornano
- Ligue 2: 17th
- Coupe de France: Round of 64
- Top goalscorer: League: Yacine Bammou (6); All: Yacine Bammou (6)
Home colours	Away colours

The 2020–21 Stade Malherbe Caen season was the 108th season and current season of the club since its creation in 1913. Caen participated in Ligue 2, the second division of French football, for the second year in a row after relegation from Ligue 1 in 2019, and also competed in the Coupe de France.

== First-team squad ==
As of 6 October 2020.

Note: Flags indicate national team as defined under FIFA eligibility rules; some limited exceptions apply. Players may hold more than one non-FIFA nationality.

No.	Pos.	Nation	Player
1	GK	FRA	Garissone Innocent (on loan from Paris SG)
2	MF	FRA	Loup Hervieu
3	DF	FRA	Yoël Armougom
4	DF	FRA	Jason Ngouabi
5	DF	RUS	Vladislav Molchan
6	MF	CGO	Prince Oniangué
7	FW	USA	Nicholas Gioacchini
8	MF	FRA	Jessy Deminguet
9	FW	FRA	Benjamin Jeannot
10	FW	MAR	Yacine Bammou
11	FW	SEN	Santy Ngom
12	MF	FRA	Johann Lepenant
13	FW	FRA	Yoann Court
14	FW	CIV	Caleb Zady
15	MF	FRA	Aliou Traoré (on loan from Manchester Utd)
17	MF	FRA	Anthony Gonçalves
18	DF	FRA	Jonathan Rivierez (captain)

No.	Pos.	Nation	Player
19	FW	GBS	Alexandre Mendy
20	DF	BFA	Steeve Yago
21	FW	FRA	Kélian Nsona
22	DF	SEN	Adama Mbengue
24	DF	FRA	Hugo Vandermersch
25	MF	FRA	Godson Kyeremeh
26	DF	FRA	Alexis Beka Beka
27	MF	FRA	Azzeddine Toufiqui
28	DF	FRA	Anthony Weber
29	MF	FRA	Jessy Pi
30	GK	FRA	Rémy Riou
32	DF	CMR	Aloys Fouda
35	DF	FRA	Pathy Malumandsoko
39	FW	FRA	Ayoub Jebbari
40	GK	FRA	Sullivan Péan
—	FW	FRA	Steve Shamal

=== Out on loan ===
Note: Flags indicate national team as defined under FIFA eligibility rules; some limited exceptions apply. Players may hold more than one non-FIFA nationality.

No.	Pos.	Nation	Player
—	GK	FRA	Marvin Golitin (on loan at Bobigny)
—	DF	COM	Younn Zahary (on loan at Pau)
—	FW	FRA	Evens Joseph (on loan at Boulogne)

No.	Pos.	Nation	Player
—	FW	CGO	Herman Moussaki (on loan at Boulogne)
—	FW	FIN	Timo Stavitski (on loan at MVV)
—	FW	FRA	Brice Tutu (on loan at Beauvais)

== Pre-season and friendlies ==
Win Draw Loss Fixtures

== Competitions ==
=== Ligue 2 ===
==== League table ====
Pos	Team	Pld	W	D	L	GF	GA	GD	Pts	Promotion or Relegation
15	Rodez	38	8	19	11	38	44	−6	43	
16	Dunkerque	38	10	11	17	34	47	−13	41	
17	Caen	38	9	14	15	34	49	−15	41	
18	Niort (O)	38	9	14	15	34	58	−24	41	Qualification for the relegation play-offs
19	Chambly (R)	38	9	11	18	41	64	−23	38	Relegation to Championnat National

Source: Ligue 2
Rules for classification: 1) Points; 2) Goal difference; 3) Number of goals scored; 4) Head-to-head goal difference; 5) Fair play points
(O) Play-off winners; (R) Relegated

==== Results summary ====
Overall								Home						Away					
Pld	W	D	L	GF	GA	GD	Pts	W	D	L	GF	GA	GD	W	D	L	GF	GA	GD
30	8	11	11	29	38	−9	35	5	6	4	13	16	−3	3	5	7	16	22	−6

Last updated: 25 March 2021.
Source: Ligue 2

==== Results by round ====
Round	1	2	3	4	5	6	7	8	9	10	11	12	13	14	15	16	17	18	19	20	21	22	23	24	25	26	27	28	29	30	31	32	33	34	35	36	37	38
Ground	A	H	A	H	A	H	A	H	A	H	A	H	A	H	H	A	H	A	H	A	H	A	H	A	H	A	H	A	H	A	H	A	A	H	A	H	A	H
Result	D	W	W	D	L	W	L	W	L	W	W	D	L	D	D	W	L	D	D	L	L	L	D	D	W	D	L	L	L	D	D	L	L	D	L	D	L	W
Position	11	6	2	4	8	4	7	4	9	4	4	4	6	7	8	7	7	8	8	9	10	10	11	11	10	9	9	12	14	14	15	15	16	17	17	18	18	17

Source: Ligue 2
A = Away; H = Home; W = Win; D = Draw; L = Loss

==== Matches ====
The league fixtures were announced on 9 July 2020.

22 August 2020 1	Clermont	0–0	Caen	Clermont-Ferrand
19:00 CEST (UTC+2)		Report		Stadium: Stade Gabriel Montpied; Attendance: 0 Referee: Olivier Thual

29 August 2020 2	Caen	1–0	Ajaccio	Caen
15:00 CEST (UTC+2)	Bammou 18' (pen.)	Report		Stadium: Stade Michel d'Ornano; Attendance: 0 Referee: Remi Landry

12 September 2020 3	Rodez	0–3	Caen	Rodez
19:00 CEST (UTC+2)		Report	Gioacchini 3'; Bammou 67'; Deminguet 89'	Stadium: Stade Paul-Lignon; Attendance: 0 Referee: Pierre Gaillouste

19 September 2020 4	Caen	0–0	Chambly	Caen
19:00 CEST (UTC+2)		Report		Stadium: Stade Michel d'Ornano; Attendance: 5,593; Referee: Romain Lissorgue

26 September 2020 5	Valenciennes	1–0	Caen	Valenciennes
19:00 CEST (UTC+2)	Ntim 10'	Report		Stadium: Stade du Hainaut; Attendance: 4,180; Referee: Florent Batta

3 October 2020 6	Caen	1–0	Amiens	Caen
15:30 CEST (UTC+2)	Gioacchini 42'	Report		Stadium: Stade Michel d'Ornano; Referee: Jérémy Stinat

17 October 2020 7	Niort	3–0	Caen	Niort
19:00 CEST (UTC+2)	Bâ 16'; Bourhane 68'; Jacob 80'	Report		Stadium: Stade René Gaillard; Referee: Romain Delpech

24 October 2020 8	Caen	1–0	Guingamp	Caen
15:00 CEST (UTC+2)	Deminguet 90'	Report		Stadium: Stade Michel d'Ornano; Referee: Thomas Léonard

31 October 2020 9	Paris FC	3–1	Caen	Paris
15:00 CET (UTC+1)	Kanté 43'; López 50' (pen.); Caddy 70' (pen.)	Report	Bammou 12' (pen.)	Stadium: Stade Charléty; Referee: Nicolas Rainville

7 November 2020 10	Caen	2–1	Nancy	Caen
19:00 (CET) (UTC+1)	Coulibaly 30' (o.g.); Gioacchini 90'	Report	Rocha Santos 27'	Stadium: Stade Michel d'Ornano; Referee: Ruddy Buquet

21 November 2020 11	Le Havre	1–2	Caen	Le Havre
15:00 (CET) (UTC+1)	Abdelli 45'	Report	Court 76'; Bammou 85' (pen.)	Stadium: Stade Océane; Referee: Stéphanie Frappart

28 November 2020 12	Caen	1–1	Châteauroux	Caen
19:00 (CET) (UTC+1)	Bammou 74' (pen.)	Report	Nouri 66'	Stadium: Stade Michel d'Ornano; Referee: Romain Lissorgue

2 December 2020 13	Pau	1–0	Caen	Pau
19:00 (CET) (UTC+1)	Armand 14'	Report		Stadium: Stade du Hameau; Referee: Guillaume Paradis

5 December 2020 14	Caen	1–1	Grenoble	Caen
19:00 (CET) (UTC+1)	Court 76' (pen.)	Report	Ravet 11'	Stadium: Stade Michel d'Ornano; Referee: Alexandre Perreau Niel

12 December 2020 15	Caen	0–0	Troyes	Caen
15:30 (CET) (UTC+1)		Report		Stadium: Stade Michel d'Ornano; Referee: Bartolomeu Varela

18 December 2020 16	Dunkerque	2–3	Caen	Dunkirk
20:00 (CET) (UTC+1)	Kebbal 16'; Bosca 89'	Report	Court 17'; Gioacchini 45'; Nsona 74'	Stadium: Stade Marcel-Tribut; Referee: Romain Lissorgue

22 December 2020 17	Caen	1–4	Sochaux	Caen
20:00 (CET) (UTC+1)	Beka Beka 7'	Report	Soumaré 6'; Niane 36'; Lasme 37', 45' (pen.)	Stadium: Stade Michel d'Ornano; Referee: Frank Schneider

5 January 2021 18	Auxerre	1–1	Caen	Auxerre
20:00 (CET) (UTC+1)	Dugimont 53'	Report	Jeannot 81'	Stadium: Stade de l'Abbé-Deschamps; Referee: Rémi Landry

11 January 2021 19	Caen	2–2	Toulouse	Caen
20:45 (CET) (UTC+1)	Nsona 10'; Mendy 18'	Report	Diakité 45'; Ngoumou 79'	Stadium: Stade Michel d'Ornano; Referee: Bastien Dechepy

16 January 2021 20	AC Ajaccio	1–0	Caen	Ajaccio
19:00 (CET) (UTC+1)	Moussiti-Oko 6'	Report		Stadium: Stade François Coty; Referee: Romain Delpech

23 January 2021 21	Caen	1–2	Rodez	Caen
19:00 (CET) (UTC+1)	Mendy 27' (pen.); Deminguet (yellow card) 71'; Rivierez (yellow card) 89'	Report	Bardy 3', 18'; Leborgne (yellow card) 26'; Célestine (yellow card) 32'	Stadium: Stade Michel d'Ornano; Referee: Arnaud Baert

30 January 2021 22	Chambly	4–2	Caen	Chambly
19:00 (CET) (UTC+1)	Eickmayer 25'; Badu 27'; Soubervie (yellow card) 39' (yellow-red card) 85'; Doucouré (yellow card) 52', (goal) 67'; Guezoui 60' (pen.)	Report	Zady 2'; Gioacchini (red card) 32'; Deminguet 90+2'	Stadium: Stade des Marais; Referee: Bartolomeu Varela Teles

2 February 2021 23	Caen	1–1	Valenciennes	Caen
20:00 (CET) (UTC+1)	Deminguet (yellow card) 31'; Bammou 52' (pen.)	Report	Guel 5'; Pellenard (yellow card) 34'; Spano (yellow card) 51'; Ntim (yellow card) 65'; Doukouré (yellow card) 86'	Stadium: Stade Michel d'Ornano; Referee: Gaël Angoula

5 February 2021 24	Amiens	0–0	Caen	Amiens
20:00 CET (UTC+1)		Report	Rivierez (yellow card) 43'; Mbengue (yellow card) 61'; Beka Beka (yellow card) 69'	Stadium: Stade de la Licorne; Referee: Pierre Gaillouste

13 February 2021 25	Caen	1–0	Niort	Caen
19:00 (CET) (UTC+1)	Vandermersch (yellow card) 50'; Court (yellow card) 58'; Weber 74'	Report	Yongwa (yellow card) 46'; Lebeau (yellow card) 81'	Stadium: Stade Michel d'Ornano; Referee: Remi Landry

22 February 2021 26	Guingamp	2–2	Caen	Guingamp
20:45 CET (UTC+1)	Niakaté (yellow card) 47', (goal) 71'; Pierrot 66'; Ntep (yellow card) 75'	Report	Oniangué 26'; Gioacchini (yellow card) 50'; Mendy 55'	Stadium: Stade de Roudourou; Referee: Mehdi Mokhtari

27 February 2021 27	Caen	0–2	Paris FC	Caen
19:00 (CET) (UTC+1)	Gioacchini (yellow card) 30'; Vandermersch (yellow card) 71'	Report	Laura 37'; Hanin (yellow card) 42'; Bamba 86'	Stadium: Stade Michel d'Ornano; Referee: Abdelatif Kherradji

2 March 2021 28	Nancy	1–0	Caen	Tomblaine
20:00 CET (UTC+1)	Scheidler 7'; Biron (yellow card) 65'	Report	Vandermersch (yellow card) 14'; Gonçalves (yellow card) 57'; Armougom (yellow card) 81'	Stadium: Stade Marcel Picot; Referee: Bartolomeu Varela Teles

15 March 2021 29	Caen	0–2	Le Havre	Caen
20:45 CET (UTC+1)	Rivierez (yellow card) 26'; Weber (yellow card) 33'	Report	Alioui 5'; Bonnet 70'; Wahib (yellow card) 77'; Mahmoud (yellow card) 90+2'	Stadium: Stade Michel d'Ornano; Referee: Romain Lissorgue

20 March 2021 30	Châteauroux	2–2	Caen	Châteauroux
20:00 CET (UTC+1)	Tormin 9'; Grange 13' (pen.); Fofana (yellow card) 33'; M'Boné (yellow card) 38'; Chouaref (yellow card) 48'; Mulumba (yellow card) 67'	Report	Jeannot 4', 28'; Gioacchini (yellow card) 34'; Beka Beka (yellow card) 58'; Gonçalves (yellow card) 79'; Mendy (yellow card) 86'; Lepenant (yellow card) 90'	Stadium: Stade Gaston Petit; Referee: Sylvain Palhies

3 April 2021 31	Caen	1–1	Pau	Caen
20:00 CEST (UTC+2)	Mendy 38'	Report	Lobry (yellow card) 42'; Riou 56' (o.g.); Batisse (yellow card) 76'	Stadium: Stade Michel d'Ornano; Referee: Gaël Angoula

10 April 2021 32	Grenoble	3–1	Caen	Grenoble
20:00 CET (UTC+1)	Pickel 49'; Ravet 74'; Straalman 81'	Report	Rivierez (yellow card) 61'; Hountondji 70'; Deminguet (yellow card) 87'	Stadium: Stade des Alpes; Referee: Romain Delpech

17 April 2021 33	Troyes	1–0	Caen	Troyes
15:00 CEST (UTC+2)	Mutombo (yellow card) 24'; Dingomé 32'; Azamoum (yellow card) 69'	Report	Weber (yellow card) 33'	Stadium: Stade de l'Aube; Referee: Pierre Gaillouste

20 April 2021 34	Caen	1–1	Dunkerque	Caen
20:00 CEST (UTC+2)	Deminguet 20', (yellow card) 66'; Court (yellow card) 46'; Yago (yellow card) 60'; Riou (red card) 88'	Report	Bosca (yellow card) 63'; Dudouit 88' (pen.)	Stadium: Stade Michel d'Ornano; Referee: Olivier Thual

24 April 2021 35	Sochaux	1–0	Caen	Montbéliard
20:00 CEST (UTC+2)	Soumaré (yellow card) 19'; Bedia 63' (pen.); Mbakata (yellow card) 76'	Report	Deminguet (yellow card) 9'; Oniangué (yellow card) 34'; Rivierez (yellow card) 79'	Stadium: Stade Auguste Bonal; Referee: Nicolas Rainville

1 May 2021 36	Caen	0–0	Auxerre	Caen
20:00 CEST (UTC+2)	Fouda (yellow card) 27'; Deminguet (yellow card) 54'; Traoré (yellow card) 86'	Report	Dugimont (yellow card) 57'; Camara (yellow card) 75'; Bellugou (yellow card) 85'	Stadium: Stade Michel d'Ornano; Referee: Bartolomeu Varela

8 May 2021 37	Toulouse	3–0	Caen	Toulouse
20:00 CEST (UTC+2)	Dejaegere 30'; Bayo 67'; Ngoumou 81'	Report	Court (penalty missed) 47'; Weber (yellow card) 57'; Yago (yellow card) 66' (yellow-red card) 66'; Mbala (yellow card) 82'	Stadium: Stadium de Toulouse; Referee: Florent Batta

15 May 2021 38	Caen	2–1	Clermont	Caen
20:00 CEST (UTC+2)	Hervieu (red card) 38'; Oniangué 82'; Jeannot 90+2' (pen.), (yellow card) 90+4'	Report	Bayo 89'	Stadium: Stade Michel d'Ornano; Referee: Bastien Dechepy

=== Coupe de France ===
20 January 2021 Eighth round	Guingamp	1–3	Caen	Guingamp
18:45 CET (UTC+1)	M'Changama 90+3'	Report	Deminguet 45'; Gioacchini 47'; Mendy 75'	Stadium: Stade de Roudourou

10 February 2021 Round of 64	Caen	0–1	Paris Saint-Germain	Caen
21:00 CET (UTC+1)	Yago (yellow card) 40'; Beka Beka (yellow card) 55'	Report	Sarabia (yellow card) 31'; Kean 49'; Paredes (yellow card) 60'	Stadium: Stade Michel d'Ornano; Attendance: 0 Referee: Jérôme Miguelgorry
