= List of French football transfers winter 2021–22 =

This is a list of French football transfers for the 2021–22 winter transfer window. Only transfers featuring Ligue 1 and Ligue 2 are listed.

== Ligue 1 ==
Note: Flags indicate national team as has been defined under FIFA eligibility rules. Players may hold more than one non-FIFA nationality.

=== Lille ===
In:

No.	Pos.	Nation	Player
11	MF	FRA	Hatem Ben Arfa (free agent)
23	MF	KOS	Edon Zhegrova (from (Switzerland) Basel)

Out:

No.	Pos.	Nation	Player
10	MF	FRA	Jonathan Ikoné (to (Italy) Fiorentina)
11	MF	TUR	Yusuf Yazıcı (on loan to (Russia) CSKA Moscow)
15	MF	MEX	Eugenio Pizzuto (to (Portugal) Braga)
28	DF	MOZ	Reinildo Mandava (to (Spain) Atlético Madrid)
—	MF	BRA	Thiago Maia (to (Brazil) Flamengo, previously on loan)

=== Paris Saint-Germain ===
In:

No.	Pos.	Nation	Player

Out:

No.	Pos.	Nation	Player
12	MF	BRA	Rafinha (on loan to (Spain) Real Sociedad)
16	GK	ESP	Sergio Rico (on loan to (Spain) Mallorca)
32	DF	FRA	Teddy Alloh (on loan to (Belgium) Eupen)
—	FW	FRA	Kenny Nagera (on loan to Avranches, previously on loan at Bastia)

=== Monaco ===
In:

No.	Pos.	Nation	Player
2	DF	BRA	Vanderson (from (Brazil) Grêmio)

Out:

No.	Pos.	Nation	Player
39	FW	FRA	Wilson Isidor (to (Russia) Lokomotiv Moscow)
—	FW	ITA	Pietro Pellegri (on loan to (Italy) Torino, previously on loan at (Italy) Milan)

=== Lyon ===
In:

No.	Pos.	Nation	Player
15	MF	FRA	Romain Faivre (from Brest)
28	MF	FRA	Tanguy Ndombele (on loan from (England) Tottenham Hotspur)

Out:

No.	Pos.	Nation	Player
6	DF	BRA	Marcelo (to Bordeaux)
20	FW	ALG	Islam Slimani (to (Portugal) Sporting CP)
28	MF	FRA	Florent da Silva (on loan to Villefranche)
39	MF	BRA	Bruno Guimarães (to (England) Newcastle United)
—	FW	FRA	Yaya Soumaré (on loan to Annecy, previously on loan at Dijon)

=== Marseille ===
In:

No.	Pos.	Nation	Player
13	FW	COD	Cédric Bakambu (from (China) Beijing Guoan)
23	DF	BIH	Sead Kolašinac (from (England) Arsenal)
—	DF	FRA	Samuel Gigot (from (Russia) Spartak Moscow)

Out:

No.	Pos.	Nation	Player
23	DF	FRA	Jordan Amavi (on loan to Nice)
—	DF	FRA	Samuel Gigot (on loan to (Russia) Spartak Moscow)
—	FW	ARG	Darío Benedetto (to (Argentina) Boca Juniors, previously on loan at (Spain) Elche)

=== Rennes ===
In:

No.	Pos.	Nation	Player

Out:

No.	Pos.	Nation	Player
18	FW	FRA	Matthis Abline (on loan to Le Havre)
—	FW	TUR	Metehan Güçlü (on loan to (Netherlands) Emmen)

=== Lens ===
In:

No.	Pos.	Nation	Player
6	MF	NOR	Patrick Berg (from (Norway) Bodø/Glimt)

Out:

No.	Pos.	Nation	Player
27	MF	SCO	Charles Boli (on loan to (Italy) Vicenza)
34	MF	FRA	Jonathan Varane (on loan to Rodez)

=== Montpellier ===
In:

No.	Pos.	Nation	Player
15	MF	SUI	Gabriel Barès (from (Switzerland) Lausanne)

Out:

No.	Pos.	Nation	Player
22	DF	URU	Mathías Suárez (on loan to (Uruguay) Montevideo City Torque)

=== Reims ===
In:

No.	Pos.	Nation	Player
4	DF	BEL	Maxime Busi (on loan from (Italy) Parma)
8	MF	SWE	Jens Cajuste (from (Denmark) Midtjylland)

Out:

No.	Pos.	Nation	Player
13	DF	MLI	Fodé Doucouré (on loan to Red Star)
24	MF	FRA	Mathieu Cafaro (to (Belgium) Standard Liège)
27	FW	CIV	N'Dri Philippe Koffi (on loan to (Portugal) Paços Ferreira)
29	DF	SEN	Moustapha Mbow (on loan to Nîmes)

=== Nice ===
In:

No.	Pos.	Nation	Player
12	DF	FRA	Jordan Amavi (on loan from Marseille)
—	DF	CIV	Kouadio Ahoussou (from (Ivory Coast) RC Abidjan)
14	FW	FRA	Bilal Brahimi (from Angers)

Out:

No.	Pos.	Nation	Player
3	DF	BRA	Robson Bambu (on loan to (Brazil) Corinthians)
13	DF	CIV	Hassane Kamara (to (England) Watford)
29	FW	FRA	Lucas Da Cunha (on loan to Clermont)
34	FW	IRL	Deji Sotona (on loan to (England) Brentford B)

=== Metz ===
In:

No.	Pos.	Nation	Player
13	DF	GNB	Fali Candé (from (Portugal) Portimonense)
27	DF	CMR	Jean-Armel Kana-Biyik (free agent)
32	MF	FRA	Ibrahim Amadou (from (Spain) Sevilla)
34	FW	CTA	Louis Mafouta (on loan from (Switzerland) Neuchâtel Xamax)

Out:

No.	Pos.	Nation	Player
12	MF	CGO	Warren Tchimbembé (on loan to (Spain) Mirandés)
13	FW	SEN	Cheikh Sabaly (on loan to Quevilly-Rouen)
20	FW	SEN	Lamine Gueye (on loan to Paris FC)
21	MF	MAR	Amine Bassi (on loan to (England) Barnsley)

=== Saint-Étienne ===
In:

No.	Pos.	Nation	Player
9	FW	SEN	Sada Thioub (on loan from Angers)
14	DF	MLI	Falaye Sacko (on loan from (Portugal) Vitória Guimarães)
22	DF	FRA	Eliaquim Mangala (free agent)
23	DF	FRA	Joris Gnagnon (free agent)
26	FW	MLI	Bakary Sako (free agent)
31	FW	FRA	Enzo Crivelli (on loan from (Turkey) İstanbul Başakşehir, previously on loan at (Turkey) Antalyaspor)
50	GK	FRA	Paul Bernardoni (on loan from Angers)

Out:

No.	Pos.	Nation	Player
1	GK	FRA	Stefan Bajic (to Pau)
9	FW	URU	Ignacio Ramírez (loan return to (Uruguay) Liverpool Montevideo)
14	FW	CIV	Jean-Philippe Krasso (on loan to Ajaccio)
22	DF	FRA	Alpha Sissoko (to Quevilly-Rouen)

=== Bordeaux ===
In:

No.	Pos.	Nation	Player
5	DF	BIH	Anel Ahmedhodžić (on loan from (Sweden) Malmö)
6	MF	UKR	Danylo Ihnatenko (on loan from (Ukraine) Shakhtar Donetsk, previously on loan at (Ukraine) Dnipro-1)
15	DF	BRA	Marcelo (from Lyon)
23	MF	FRA	Josuha Guilavogui (on loan from (Germany) VfL Wolfsburg)

Out:

No.	Pos.	Nation	Player
5	MF	BRA	Otávio (on loan to (Brazil) Atlético Mineiro)
6	DF	FRA	Laurent Koscielny (free agent)
9	FW	NGA	Josh Maja (on loan to (England) Stoke City)
10	MF	NGA	Samuel Kalu (to (England) Watford)

=== Angers ===
In:

No.	Pos.	Nation	Player
22	FW	CRO	Marin Jakoliš (from (Croatia) Hajduk Split, previously on loan at (Croatia) Šibenik)
23	MF	ALG	Nabil Bentaleb (free agent)

Out:

No.	Pos.	Nation	Player
1	GK	FRA	Paul Bernardoni (on loan to Saint-Étienne)
14	FW	FRA	Bilal Brahimi (to Nice)
22	FW	SEN	Sada Thioub (on loan to Saint-Étienne)
23	MF	FRA	Antonin Bobichon (on loan to Nancy)
28	FW	ALG	Farid El Melali (on loan to Pau)

=== Strasbourg ===
In:

No.	Pos.	Nation	Player
29	DF	FRA	Ismaël Doukouré (from Valenciennes)

Out:

No.	Pos.	Nation	Player
12	FW	RSA	Lebo Mothiba (on loan to Troyes)
30	GK	SEN	Bingourou Kamara (on loan to (Belgium) Charleroi)
40	GK	HAI	Alexandre Pierre (on loan to Annecy)

=== Lorient ===
In:

No.	Pos.	Nation	Player
8	MF	NGA	Bonke Innocent (from (Sweden) Malmö)
9	FW	MLI	Ibrahima Koné (from (Norway) Sarpsborg 08)
—	FW	NGA	Taofeek Ismaheel (from (Norway) Fredrikstad)

Out:

No.	Pos.	Nation	Player
4	DF	FRA	Loris Mouyokolo (on loan to Bourg-en-Bresse)
5	DF	MAD	Thomas Fontaine (to Nancy)
27	FW	AUT	Adrian Grbić (on loan to (Netherlands) Vitesse)
—	FW	NGA	Taofeek Ismaheel (on loan to (Norway) Vålerenga)

=== Brest ===
In:

No.	Pos.	Nation	Player
11	FW	URU	Martín Satriano (on loan from (Italy) Inter Milan)
24	FW	ALG	Youcef Belaïli (from Qatar SC)

Out:

No.	Pos.	Nation	Player
21	MF	FRA	Romain Faivre (to Lyon)

=== Nantes ===
In:

No.	Pos.	Nation	Player

Out:

No.	Pos.	Nation	Player
13	DF	MLI	Molla Wagué (to (Belgium) Seraing)
28	FW	BEL	Renaud Emond (to (Belgium) Standard Liège)
40	GK	FRA	Charly Jan (to Bourg-en-Bresse)

=== Troyes ===
In:

No.	Pos.	Nation	Player
2	DF	USA	Erik Palmer-Brown (from (England) Manchester City, previously on loan)
12	DF	POR	Abdu Conté (from (Portugal) Moreirense)
—	FW	RSA	Lebo Mothiba (on loan from Strasbourg)
—	MF	SRB	Luka Ilić (from (England) Manchester City, previously on loan at (Netherlands) Twente)
—	FW	CAN	Iké Ugbo (on loan from (Belgium) Genk)

Out:

No.	Pos.	Nation	Player
8	DF	FRA	Jimmy Giraudon (on loan to (Spain) Leganés)
12	FW	ENG	Levi Lumeka (on loan to (Portugal) Vilafranquense)
13	DF	FRA	Gabriel Mutombo (on loan to (Portugal) Vilafranquense)
18	MF	CTA	Calvin Bombo (free agent)
21	DF	NED	Philippe Sandler (loan return to (England) Manchester City)
26	MF	ENG	Patrick Roberts (loan return to (England) Manchester City)
—	MF	SVN	Enrik Ostrc (on loan to (Belgium) Lommel, previously on loan at (Slovenia) Olimpija Ljubljana)

=== Clermont ===
In:

No.	Pos.	Nation	Player
9	FW	FRA	Grejohn Kyei (from (Switzerland) Servette)
10	FW	FRA	Lucas Da Cunha (on loan from Nice)

Out:

No.	Pos.	Nation	Player
3	DF	FRA	Julien Boyer (on loan to Bastia)
9	FW	FRA	Jordan Tell (to Grenoble)
10	MF	URU	Jonathan Iglesias (to Paris FC)

== Ligue 2 ==
Note: Flags indicate national team as has been defined under FIFA eligibility rules. Players may hold more than one non-FIFA nationality.

=== Nîmes ===
In:

No.	Pos.	Nation	Player
3	DF	FRA	Scotty Sadzoute (on loan from (Belgium) OH Leuven)
29	DF	SEN	Moustapha Mbow (on loan from Reims)

Out:

No.	Pos.	Nation	Player
13	FW	ALG	Karim Aribi (to (Algeria) CR Belouizdad)

=== Dijon ===
In:

No.	Pos.	Nation	Player

Out:

No.	Pos.	Nation	Player
1	GK	SUI	Anthony Racioppi (to (Switzerland) Young Boys)
4	DF	ENG	Jonathan Panzo (to (England) Nottingham Forest)
17	FW	FRA	Yaya Soumaré (loan return to Lyon)

=== Toulouse ===
In:

No.	Pos.	Nation	Player
20	FW	JAM	Junior Flemmings (to (United States) Birmingham Legion)

Out:

No.	Pos.	Nation	Player
27	FW	CMR	Stéphane Zobo (to Béziers)
—	DF	URU	Agustín Rogel (to (Argentina) Estudiantes, previously on loan)
—	DF	NOR	Ruben Gabrielsen (free agent, previously on loan at (Denmark) Copenhagen)

=== Grenoble ===
In:

No.	Pos.	Nation	Player
2	FW	GAM	Abdoulie Sanyang (from (The Gambia) Superstars Academy, previously on loan at (Belgium) Beerschot)
21	DF	FRA	Allan Tchaptchet (free agent)
23	MF	FRA	Axel Ngando (free agent)
24	FW	FRA	Jordan Tell (from Clermont)

Out:

No.	Pos.	Nation	Player
9	FW	TOG	David Henen (to (Belgium) Kortrijk)
21	DF	FRA	Chris-Vianney Goteni (on loan to Canet Roussillon)
24	MF	SUI	Yannick Marchand (loan return to (Switzerland) Basel)
28	DF	FRA	Jules Sylvestre-Brac (on loan to Moulins Yzeure)

=== Paris ===
In:

No.	Pos.	Nation	Player
10	MF	URU	Jonathan Iglesias (from Clermont)
13	FW	MAR	Khalid Boutaïb (from Le Havre)
26	FW	SEN	Lamine Gueye (on loan from Metz)

Out:

No.	Pos.	Nation	Player
6	MF	FRA	Saïd Arab (on loan to Bastia-Borgo)
7	FW	FRA	Gaëtan Laura (on loan to (Italy) Cosenza)
33	FW	CTA	Arnaud Tattevin (to Avranches)

=== Auxerre ===
In:

No.	Pos.	Nation	Player

Out:

No.	Pos.	Nation	Player

=== Sochaux ===
In:

No.	Pos.	Nation	Player

Out:

No.	Pos.	Nation	Player
27	FW	MLI	Adama Niane (on loan to Dunkerque)

=== Nancy ===
In:

No.	Pos.	Nation	Player
14	MF	FRA	Antonin Bobichon (on loan from Angers)
20	DF	MAD	Thomas Fontaine (from Lorient)
33	FW	COD	Yeni Ngbakoto (from (Greece) Panathinaikos)

Out:

No.	Pos.	Nation	Player

=== Guingamp ===
In:

No.	Pos.	Nation	Player
22	DF	FRA	Stephen Quemper (from Bastia)

Out:

No.	Pos.	Nation	Player
22	DF	BEL	Logan Ndenbe (to (United States) Kansas City)
23	DF	MAD	Jérôme Mombris (retired)
33	MF	FRA	Jules Gaudin (on loan to Bastia-Borgo)
35	FW	FRA	Ervin Taha (on loan to Créteil)

=== Amiens ===
In:

No.	Pos.	Nation	Player

Out:

No.	Pos.	Nation	Player
13	DF	GLP	Mickaël Alphonse (to (Israel) Maccabi Haifa)
22	MF	FRA	Iron Gomis (on loan to Dunkerque)
25	DF	POR	Rafael Fonseca (to (Portugal) Académico Viseu)

=== Valenciennes ===
In:

No.	Pos.	Nation	Player
12	FW	FRA	Ugo Bonnet (from Rodez)
13	MF	FRA	Florian Martin (free agent)
15	FW	CIV	Cheick Timité (from (Spain) Fuenlabrada)

Out:

No.	Pos.	Nation	Player
1	GK	BEN	Saturnin Allagbé (loan return to Dijon)
4	MF	BEN	Sessi D'Almeida (on loan to (Portugal) Tondela)
20	DF	FRA	Ismaël Doukouré (to Strasbourg)

=== Le Havre ===
In:

No.	Pos.	Nation	Player
12	FW	FRA	Matthis Abline (on loan from Rennes)

Out:

No.	Pos.	Nation	Player
9	FW	MAR	Khalid Boutaïb (to Paris FC)

=== Ajaccio ===
In:

No.	Pos.	Nation	Player
17	FW	CIV	Jean-Philippe Krasso (on loan from Saint-Étienne)

Out:

No.	Pos.	Nation	Player
—	MF	FRA	Lucas Pellegrini (to (Luxembourg) Titus Pétange, previously on loan at Bastia Borgo)

=== Pau ===
In:

No.	Pos.	Nation	Player
2	FW	FRA	Jared Khasa (on loan from (Switzerland) Sion)
15	FW	ALG	Farid El Melali (on loan from Angers)
22	MF	FRA	Denis-Will Poha (on loan from (Portugal) Vitória de Guimarães)
50	GK	FRA	Stefan Bajic (from Saint-Étienne)

Out:

No.	Pos.	Nation	Player
27	FW	CIV	Charly Keita (to Sedan)

=== Rodez ===
In:

No.	Pos.	Nation	Player
15	DF	FRA	Serge-Philippe Raux-Yao (from (Belgium) Cercle Brugge)
22	FW	ISL	Árni Vilhjálmsson (from (Iceland) Breiðablik)
27	MF	FRA	Jonathan Varane (on loan from Lens)
28	FW	FRA	Jean-Pierre Tiéhi (on loan from (England) Fulham)

Out:

No.	Pos.	Nation	Player
11	FW	FRA	Ugo Bonnet (to Valenciennes)

=== Caen ===
In:

No.	Pos.	Nation	Player
28	MF	FRA	Djibril Diani (from (Switzerland) Grasshoppers)

Out:

No.	Pos.	Nation	Player
2	MF	FRA	Loup Hervieu (to (Belgium) Mandel United)
4	DF	FRA	Jason Ngouabi (on loan to Sète 34)
21	FW	FRA	Kélian Nsona (to (Germany) Hertha BSC)
29	MF	SWE	Zeidane Inoussa (on loan to (Spain) Real Murcia)
31	FW	FRA	Evens Joseph (to Sète 34)
32	DF	CMR	Aloys Fouda (on loan to Chambly)
—	FW	FIN	Timo Stavitski (free agent)

=== Dunkerque ===
In:

No.	Pos.	Nation	Player
11	MF	FRA	Iron Gomis (on loan from Amiens)
26	FW	MLI	Adama Niane (on loan from Sochaux)
29	MF	FRA	Adam Abeddou (from US Vimy)

Out:

No.	Pos.	Nation	Player
3	DF	FRA	Loïc Kouagba (to Red Star)
7	FW	BEN	Désiré Segbé Azankpo (on loan to (Romania) Dinamo București)
11	FW	LAO	Billy Ketkeophomphone (to (Malaysia) Sri Pahang)

=== Chamois Niortais ===
In:

No.	Pos.	Nation	Player
15	MF	BEN	Junior Olaitan (from (Benin) Ayema)

Out:

No.	Pos.	Nation	Player
23	MF	FRA	Tom Lebeau (on loan to (Greece) Apollon Pontus)

=== Bastia ===
In:

No.	Pos.	Nation	Player
1	GK	FRA	Zacharie Boucher (free agent)
12	MF	MLI	Yacouba Sylla (free agent)
22	FW	FRA	Frank Magri (from Angers B)
—	FW	COD	Harrison Manzala (free agent)
—	DF	FRA	Julien Boyer (on loan from Clermont)

Out:

No.	Pos.	Nation	Player
11	DF	FRA	Stephen Quemper (to Guingamp)
29	FW	FRA	Kenny Nagera (loan return to Paris Saint-Germain)

=== Quevilly-Rouen ===
In:

No.	Pos.	Nation	Player
2	DF	FRA	Alpha Sissoko (from Saint-Étienne)
15	FW	SEN	Cheikh Sabaly (on loan from Metz)
24	FW	SEN	Issa Soumaré (on loan from (Belgium) Beerschot)

Out:

No.	Pos.	Nation	Player
22	DF	FRA	Robin Taillan (to Sedan)

== See also ==
- 2021–22 Ligue 1
- 2021–22 Ligue 2
