= Lamine Sy =

Senegalese footballer (born 2002)

Personal information
- Date of birth: 10 August 2002 (age 24)
- Place of birth: Les Mureaux, France
- Height: 1.71 m (5 ft 7 in)
- Positions: Right-back; midfielder

Team information
- Current team: Auxerre
- Number: 27

Youth career
- –2014: OFC les Mureaux
- 2014–2021: Caen

Senior career*
Years	Team	Apps	(Gls)
2021–2025	Caen II	28	(0)
2021–2025	Caen	23	(0)
2023–2024	→ Rouen (loan)	31	(3)
2025–	Auxerre	24	(0)

International career^{‡}
2026–	Senegal	3	(0)
- * Club domestic league appearances and goals as of 20 May 2026 ‡ National team caps and goals as of 4 October 2026

Lamine Sy (born 10 August 2002) is a professional footballer who plays as a right-back for Auxerre. Born in France, he represents the Senegal national team.

== Club career ==
Lamine Sy joined the Stade Malherbe de Caen academy in 2014 from the Olympique of les Mureaux, starting to play with the Norman team reserve in National 3 during the 2019–20 season.

Playing only one game that season and during the following one in National 2, he eventually established himself as a regular starter with the reserve in 2021–22 under Fabrice Vandeputte management, earning his first calls to the first team in February 2022.

He made his professional debut for SM Caen on the 5 February 2022, replacing the right-back Hugo Vandermersch during a 1–1 away Ligue 2 away draw against AS Nancy.

== International career ==
Sy was one of the players who were called up with the Senegal national team by head coach Patrick Vieira for the 2027 Africa Cup of Nations qualification matches against Mozambique and Ethiopia on 25 and 29 September 2026, respectively; and the friendly match against Comoros on 4 October 2026.

== Style of play ==
First playing as a midfielder, Sy was moved to the right-back position by Vandeputte where he became a starter in the reserve and played in Caen first team. He is described as a fast, powerful and agile footballer, able to make good use of his technical abilities to be decisive in the attacking phases.

== Personal life ==
Having grown up in Île-de-France, Lamine Sy is the younger brother of Harouna Sy, who also plays professionally as a fullback, at Amiens. He's of Senegalese descent.
