= Nicolas Pépé =

Ivory Coast international footballer (born 1995)

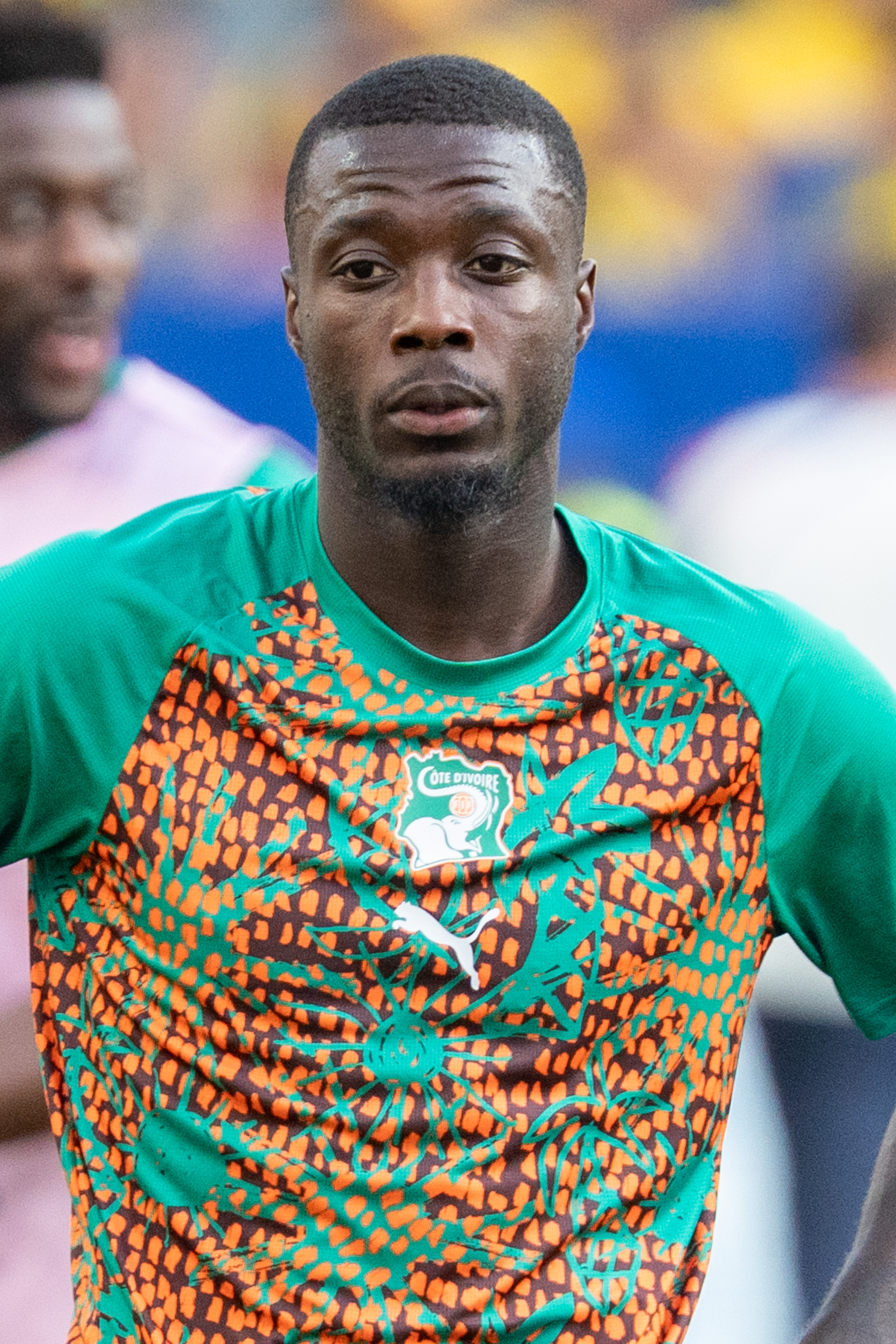
- Pépé with Ivory Coast in 2026

Personal information
- Full name: Nicolas Pépé
- Date of birth: 29 May 1995 (age 31)
- Place of birth: Mantes-la-Jolie, France
- Height: 1.83 m (6 ft 0 in)
- Positions: Right winger; forward

Team information
- Current team: Villarreal
- Number: 19

Youth career
- Solitaire Paris Est
- Poitiers

Senior career*
Years	Team	Apps	(Gls)
2012–2013	Poitiers	9	(2)
2013–2015	Angers II	41	(9)
2013–2017	Angers	40	(3)
2015–2016	→ Orléans (loan)	29	(7)
2017–2019	Lille	74	(35)
2019–2023	Arsenal	80	(16)
2022–2023	→ Nice (loan)	19	(6)
2023–2024	Trabzonspor	19	(5)
2024–	Villarreal	73	(13)

International career^{‡}
2016–	Ivory Coast	60	(14)
Medal record
Representing Ivory Coast
Men's football
Africa Cup of Nations
Winner	2023 Ivory Coast
- * Club domestic league appearances and goals as of 22 November 2026 ‡ National team caps and goals as of 30 June 2026

Nicolas Pépé (born 29 May 1995) is a professional footballer who plays as a right winger or forward for La Liga club Villarreal. Born in France, he plays for the Ivory Coast national team.

Pépé began his senior club career with Poitiers in the Championnat de France Amateur 2. He signed for Angers in 2013, aged 18, and spent a season on loan at Orléans in 2015. He signed for Lille in 2017, and was named to the UNFP Ligue 1 Team of the Year in the 2018–19 season. That summer, Pépé joined Arsenal for a then club-record fee of £72 million, and won the FA Cup in his debut season. In 2022, he was loaned to Nice, and then left on a free transfer to Trabzonspor.

Pépé, who was born in France to Ivorian parents, made his debut for the Ivory Coast national team in 2016. He was selected for the Africa Cup of Nations in 2017, 2019, 2021, and 2023, winning the 2023 tournament. He also played at the 2026 FIFA World Cup.

== Early life ==
Pépé was born in Mantes-la-Jolie, Île-de-France, and grew up in the 19th arrondissement of Paris. He started his career originally playing as a goalkeeper for local side Solitaire Paris Est until he was 14 years old. When his father Celestin, a prison guard, was transferred to Poitiers, Pépé began his senior career as an outfield player with Poitiers FC in the Championnat de France Amateur 2 (fifth tier) in 2012–13.

== Club career ==
=== Angers ===
Pépé signed for Angers in 2013, and spent his first season with the reserves in the CFA 2.

He made his professional debut in the second round of the Coupe de la Ligue in a 2–1 home loss to Arles-Avignon on 26 August 2014, as a 73rd-minute substitute for Yohann Eudeline. His first Ligue 2 match was on 21 November 2014, starting in a 1–1 Ligue 2 draw away to Ajaccio.

==== Orléans (loan) ====
Pépé was loaned to Orléans for the 2015–16 Championnat National, and helped the club to promotion from the third tier as runners-up. He returned to an Angers side playing in Ligue 1 and which reached the 2017 Coupe de France Final, where he started in a 1–0 loss to Paris Saint-Germain at the Stade de France.

=== Lille ===
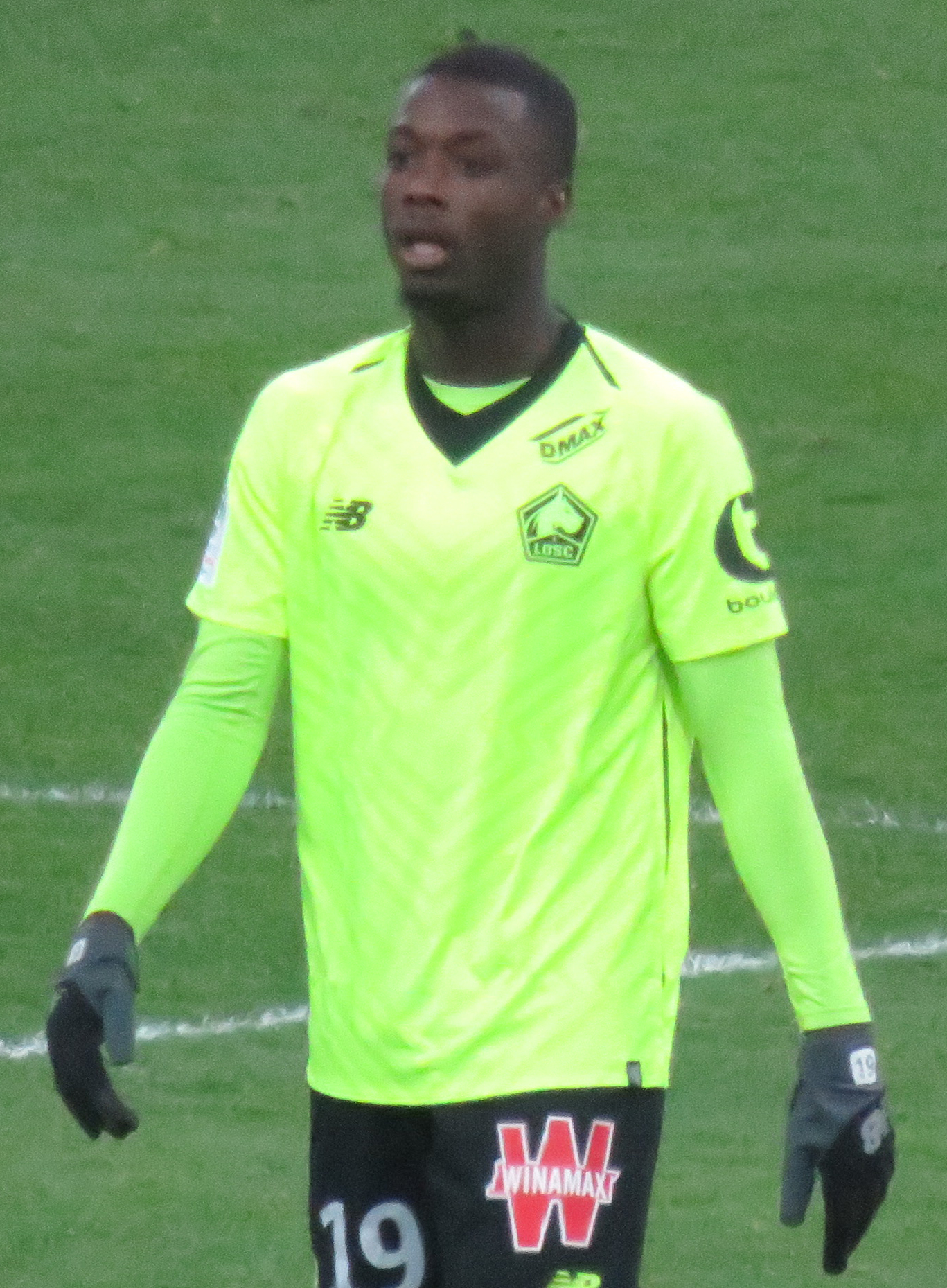
Pépé playing for Lille in 2019

On 21 June 2017, Pépé signed a five-year deal with Lille, for a maximum transfer fee of €10 million, after being signed by head coach Marcelo Bielsa who had scouted the player by watching footage of every Ligue 1 game he had played in for Angers, before scouting him in person. Pépé described Bielsa as "special" and a "great coach". He started the season playing as a striker after being converted into playing the position under Bielsa, before finishing the season under the new Lille head coach Christophe Galtier, playing as a winger.

During the entirety of the 2017–18 Ligue 1 season, he was a regular in a Lille side that narrowly avoided relegation, missing only two games and scoring 13 times, including two apiece in away wins at Metz and Toulouse.

On 15 September 2018, during the 2018–19 Ligue 1 season, Pépé scored a hat-trick, including two penalties, in the 3–2 away win over Amiens. Days later, it was confirmed by club president Gérard Lopez that Barcelona were among several clubs that were interested in signing him. On 14 April 2019, Pépé scored a goal and provided two assists in the 5–1 home win over Paris Saint-Germain. He finished the 2018–19 Ligue 1 season with 22 goals, second only to PSG's Kylian Mbappé, with 11 assists, and was named in the UNFP Team of the Year and as the Lille Best Player of the season winning the Dogue de la saison award.

=== Arsenal ===
On 1 August 2019, it was announced that Pépé had joined Premier League club Arsenal for a then club-record fee of €80 million (£72 million), eclipsing the previous record of €62 million for Pierre-Emerick Aubameyang. Upon signing for Arsenal, he was handed the number 19 shirt.

Pépé made his Arsenal debut in a 1–0 away win over Newcastle United on 11 August, as a substitute for Reiss Nelson in the 71st minute. His first start for the club came two weeks later in a 3–1 loss to Liverpool, in which he played the full 90 minutes. He scored his first Arsenal goal, from the penalty spot, in the team's 3–2 home win over Aston Villa on 22 September. He scored his first European goals in Arsenal's UEFA Europa League 3–2 home win over Vitória de Guimarães on 24 October, two free-kicks.

On 1 January 2020, Pépé scored Arsenal's first goal in a 2–0 home victory over Manchester United, marking new head-coach Mikel Arteta's first win. On 16 February, Pépé scored once and assisted twice in a 4–0 win over Newcastle United. On 28 June, he scored his first FA Cup goal in a 2–1 away win against Sheffield United in the quarter-finals, giving Arsenal the lead in the 25th minute from the penalty spot. On 1 August, he played the whole 90 minutes of the FA Cup Final match against Chelsea to win his first club trophy as an Arsenal player, contributing the assist for Aubameyang's second goal.

Pépé received the first red card of his career on 22 November 2020 in a 0–0 away draw against Leeds United after clashing heads with Ezgjan Alioski in the 51st minute. On 2 February 2021, he beat two defenders before scoring in a game against Wolverhampton Wanderers; that goal was later voted as Goal of the Month for February on Arsenal's official website.

On 24 February 2022, Pépé scored his first goal of the 2021–22 Premier League season in a 2–1 win against Wolverhampton with an 82nd-minute strike, and was instrumental in the buildup of forcing an own goal in the 95th minute to cap a late comeback.

Pépé played 112 games over all competitions for Arsenal, scoring 27 goals. He took no part in the start of the 2022–23 season in his last month at the club. On 25 August 2022, he joined Ligue 1 club Nice on loan for the remainder of the 2022–23 season without an option to buy.

=== Trabzonspor ===
Pépé moved to Süper Lig side Trabzonspor on 8 September 2023. He departed Arsenal on a free transfer, having had one year left on his contract.

=== Villarreal ===
On 4 August 2024, Pépé signed for La Liga club Villarreal on a free transfer. He signed a two-year deal, and joined compatriot Eric Bailly. In his first season with the club, he made 28 appearances and contributed to 9 goals, scoring 3 times and providing 6 assists.

In July 2025, he signed a new deal to last until 2028. He began the 2025–26 season by earning the La Liga Player of the Month award for August after recording two goals and an assist in Villarreal's opening three matches.

== International career ==
Pépé was born in France to Ivorian parents. He received a call up to the Ivory Coast national team in November 2016, and was an unused substitute in the goalless draw away to Morocco in 2018 FIFA World Cup qualification on 12 November. He made his debut three days later in a friendly of the same score against his birth nation, France, at the Stade Bollaert-Delelis in Lens, playing the final four minutes in place of Max-Alain Gradel.

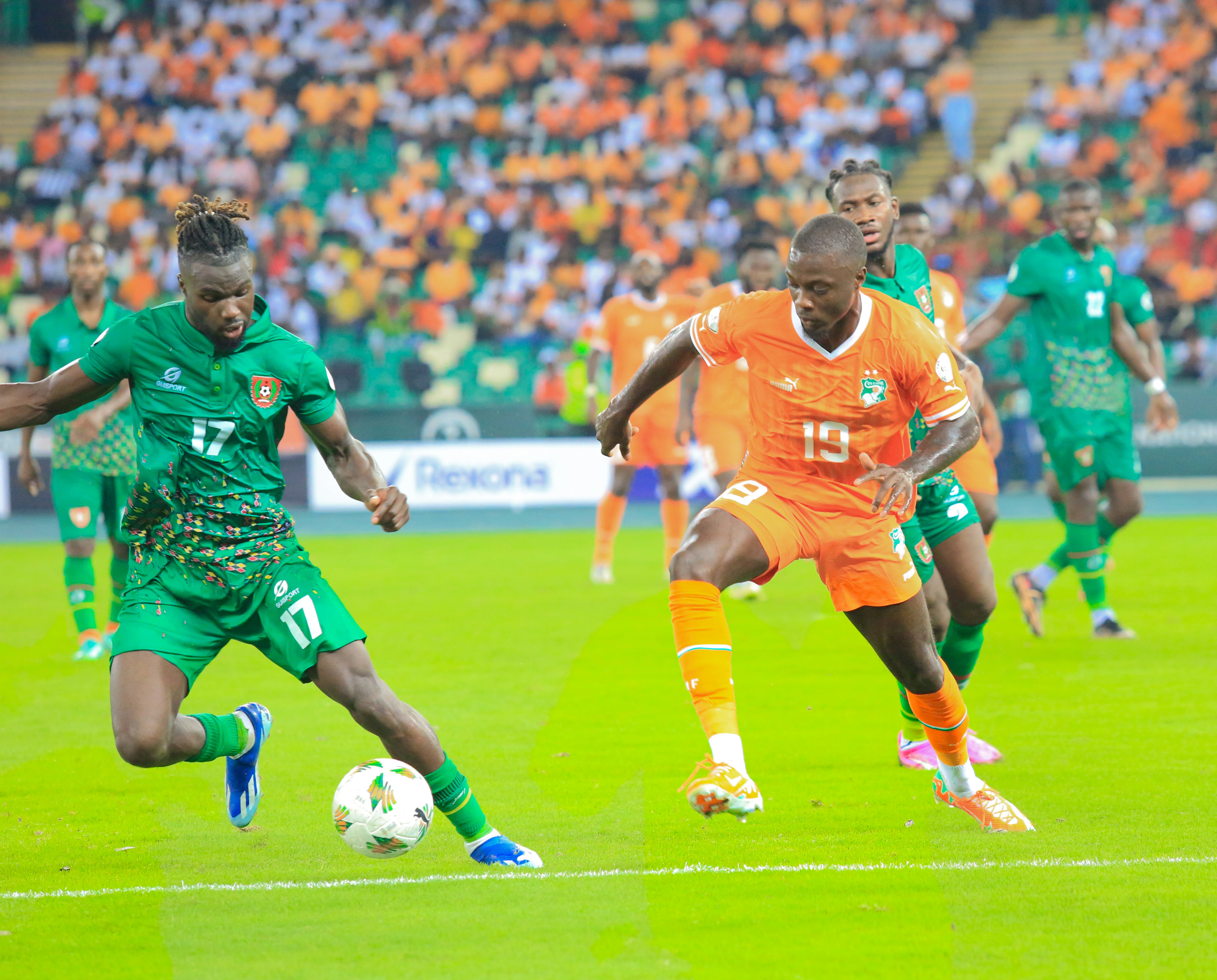
Pépé in action with Ivory Coast during the 2023 Africa Cup of Nations

Pépé was named in Michel Dussuyer's 23-man squad for the 2017 Africa Cup of Nations in Gabon, but took no part as the Elephants were eliminated in the group stage.

On 24 March 2018, in a friendly against Togo in France, Pépé scored his first international goals in the first half of a 2–2 draw. He followed it three days later, with another goal in a 2–1 win against Moldova in the same stadium.

Pépé was called up for the 2019 Africa Cup of Nations in Egypt. He was absent from their quarter-final penalty shootout defeat by Algeria, having been dropped for Max Alain Gradel due to a lack of form.

At the 2021 Africa Cup of Nations in Cameroon, Pépé scored in a draw with Sierra Leone and a win over holders Algeria in the group stage.

Pépé missed over a year of international football between November 2022 and being chosen for the 2023 Africa Cup of Nations. At the tournament on home soil, he won a late penalty that Franck Kessié converted to take the game to extra time and a penalty shootout victory over reigning champions Senegal, en route to winning the title.

On 15 May 2026, Pépé was named by Ivory Coast coach Emerse Faé in his list of 26 players in order to participate in the 2026 World Cup. On 25 June, he scored a brace and was named Man of the Match in a 2–0 victory over Curaçao, securing his country's first-ever qualification for the World Cup knockout stage.

== Style of play ==
Pépé is known as a quick and skilled attacking winger who is comfortable on both flanks, but usually plays on the right wing cutting onto his left foot; he was also converted from playing in wide positions by former Lille head coach Marcelo Bielsa to play as a striker on either the inside or central channel.

== Media ==
Pépé was involved in the Amazon Original sports docuseries All or Nothing: Arsenal, which documented the club by spending time with the coaching staff and players behind the scenes both on and off the field throughout their 2021–22 season.

== Career statistics ==
=== Club ===
As of match played 22 November 2026

Appearances and goals by club, season and competition
Club	Season	League			National cup (Note: Includes Coupe de France, FA Cup, Turkish Cup, Copa del Rey)		League cup (Note: Includes Coupe de la Ligue, EFL Cup)		Europe		Total	
Club	Season	Division	Apps	Goals	Apps	Goals	Apps	Goals	Apps	Goals	Apps	Goals
Poitiers	2012–13	CFA 2	9	2	—		—		—		9	2
Angers II	2013–14	CFA 2	19	3	—		—		—		19	3
Angers II	2014–15	CFA 2	22	6	—		—		—		22	6
Angers II	Total		41	9	—		—		—		41	9
Angers	2014–15	Ligue 2	7	0	—		1	0	—		8	0
Angers	2016–17	Ligue 1	33	3	5	0	1	0	—		39	3
Angers	Total		40	3	5	0	2	0	—		47	3
Orléans (loan)	2015–16	Championnat National	29	7	2	1	1	0	—		32	8
Lille	2017–18	Ligue 1	36	13	2	1	—		—		38	14
Lille	2018–19	Ligue 1	38	22	3	1	1	0	—		42	23
Lille	Total		74	35	5	2	1	0	—		80	37
Arsenal	2019–20	Premier League	31	5	5	1	0	0	6 (Note: Appearances in UEFA Europa League)	2	42	8
Arsenal	2020–21	Premier League	29	10	2	0	3	0	13	6	47	16
Arsenal	2021–22	Premier League	20	1	0	0	3	2	—		23	3
Arsenal	Total		80	16	7	1	6	2	19	8	112	27
Nice (loan)	2022–23	Ligue 1	19	6	1	0	—		8 (Note: Appearances in UEFA Europa Conference League)	2	28	8
Trabzonspor	2023–24	Süper Lig	19	5	4	1	—		—		23	6
Villarreal	2024–25	La Liga	28	3	0	0	—		—		28	3
Villarreal	2025–26	La Liga	36	8	2	0	—		8 (Note: Appearances in UEFA Champions League)	0	46	8
Villarreal	2026–27	La Liga	9	2	1	1	—		2	0	12	3
Villarreal	Total		73	13	3	1	—		10	0	86	14
Career total			384	96	27	6	10	2	37	10	458	114

=== International ===
As of match played 30 June 2026

Appearances and goals by national team and year
National team	Year	Apps	Goals
Ivory Coast	2016	1	0
Ivory Coast	2017	6	0
Ivory Coast	2018	4	3
Ivory Coast	2019	9	2
Ivory Coast	2020	4	0
Ivory Coast	2021	4	1
Ivory Coast	2022	9	4
Ivory Coast	2024	10	1
Ivory Coast	2025	6	0
Ivory Coast	2026	7	3
Total		60	14

As of match played 25 June 2026
Scores and results list Ivory Coast's goal tally first, score column indicates score after each Pépé goal.

List of international goals scored by Nicolas Pépé
No.	Date	Venue	Opponent	Score	Result	Competition
1	24 March 2018	Stade Pierre Brisson, Beauvais, France	Togo	1–0	2–2	Friendly
2	24 March 2018	Stade Pierre Brisson, Beauvais, France	Togo	2–0	2–2	Friendly
3	27 March 2018	Stade Pierre Brisson, Beauvais, France	Moldova	2–0	2–1	Friendly
4	23 March 2019	Stade Félix Houphouët-Boigny, Abidjan, Ivory Coast	Rwanda	1–0	3–0	2019 Africa Cup of Nations qualification
5	13 October 2019	Stade de la Licorne, Amiens, France	DR Congo	2–0	3–1	Friendly
6	11 October 2021	Stade de l'Amitie, Cotonou, Benin	Malawi	1–0	2–1	2022 FIFA World Cup qualification
7	16 January 2022	Japoma Stadium, Douala, Cameroon	Sierra Leone	2–1	2–2	2021 Africa Cup of Nations
8	20 January 2022	Japoma Stadium, Douala, Cameroon	Algeria	3–0	3–1	2021 Africa Cup of Nations
9	25 March 2022	Stade Vélodrome, Marseille, France	France	1–0	1–2	Friendly
10	16 November 2022	Stade de Marrakech, Marrakesh, Morocco	Burundi	4–0	4–0	Friendly
11	11 October 2024	Laurent Pokou Stadium, San-Pédro, Ivory Coast	Sierra Leone	1–0	4–1	2025 Africa Cup of Nations qualification
12	31 March 2026	Hill Dickinson Stadium, Liverpool, England	Scotland	1–0	1–0	Friendly
13	25 June 2026	Lincoln Financial Field, Philadelphia, United States	Curaçao	1–0	2–0	2026 FIFA World Cup
14	25 June 2026	Lincoln Financial Field, Philadelphia, United States	Curaçao	2–0	2–0	2026 FIFA World Cup

== Honours ==
Arsenal

- FA Cup: 2019–20

Ivory Coast

- Africa Cup of Nations: 2023

Individual

- UNFP Ligue 1 Team of the Year: 2018–19
- UNFP Ligue 1 Player of the Month: September 2018, January 2019
- Prix Marc-Vivien Foé: 2019
- Championnat National Player of the Season: 2015–16
- Lille Player of the Season: 2018–19
- UEFA Europa League Squad of the Season: 2020–21
- La Liga Player of the Month: August 2025
