= Sullivan Péan =

French footballer (born 1999)

Personal information
- Date of birth: 27 October 1999 (age 27)
- Place of birth: Cherbourg-Octeville, France
- Height: 1.90 m (6 ft 3 in)
- Position: Goalkeeper

Team information
- Current team: Villefranche
- Number: 1

Senior career*
Years	Team	Apps	(Gls)
2018–2023	Caen B	27	(0)
2020–2023	Caen	18	(0)
2022–2023	→ Dunkerque (loan)	21	(0)
2023–	Villefranche	98	(0)
- * Club domestic league appearances and goals as of 23 June 2026

Sullivan Péan (born 27 October 1999) is a French professional footballer who plays as a goalkeeper for Ligue 3 club Villefranche.

== Career ==
Péan made his professional debut with Caen in a 3–1 Ligue 2 loss to Paris FC on 31 October 2020. He made his Coupe de France debut in a 1–0 loss to Paris Saint-Germain on 10 February 2021. On 24 June 2022, Péan moved to Dunkerque on loan.

On 17 July 2023, Péan left Caen and signed for Villefranche in the Championnat National.

== Career statistics ==
As of 10 May 2025

Appearances and goals by club, season and competition
Club	Season	League			Cup		Total	
Club	Season	Division	Apps	Goals	Apps	Goals	Apps	Goals
Caen B	2017–18	National 3	1	0	—		1	0
Caen B	2018–19	National 3	1	0	—		1	0
Caen B	2019–20	National 3	8	0	—		8	0
Caen B	2020–21	National 2	5	0	—		5	0
Caen B	2021–22	National 2	12	0	—		12	0
Caen B	Total		27	0	—		27	0
Caen	2020–21	Ligue 2	12	0	1	0	13	0
Caen	2021–22	Ligue 2	6	0	1	0	7	0
Caen	Total		18	0	2	0	20	0
Dunkerque (loan)	2022–23	National	21	0	0	0	21	0
Villefranche	2023–24	National	34	0	1	0	35	0
Villefranche	2024–25	National	32	0	3	0	35	0
Villefranche	Total		66	0	4	0	70	0
Career total			133	0	6	0	138	0
