= 2022–23 OGC Nice season =

OGC Nice
2022–23 season
- Owner: Ineos
- President: Jean-Pierre Rivère
- Head coach: Lucien Favre (until 9 January); Didier Digard (caretaker, from 9 January)
- Stadium: Allianz Riviera
- Ligue 1: 9th
- Coupe de France: Round of 64
- UEFA Europa Conference League: Quarter-finals
- Top goalscorer: League: Gaëtan Laborde (13); All: Gaëtan Laborde (16)
Home colours	Away colours	Third colours

The 2022–23 season was the 96th season in the history of OGC Nice and their 21st consecutive season in the topflight. The club participated in Ligue 1, the Coupe de France, and the UEFA Europa Conference League.

== Players ==
=== First-team squad ===
As of 31 January 2023.

Note: Flags indicate national team as defined under FIFA eligibility rules; some limited exceptions apply. Players may hold more than one non-FIFA nationality.

No.	Pos.	Nation	Player
1	GK	DEN	Kasper Schmeichel
4	DF	BRA	Dante (captain)
8	MF	NED	Pablo Rosario
9	FW	NGR	Terem Moffi (on loan from Lorient)
10	MF	FRA	Sofiane Diop
11	MF	ENG	Ross Barkley
14	MF	ALG	Billal Brahimi
15	DF	ENG	Joe Bryan (on loan from Fulham)
16	MF	WAL	Aaron Ramsey
19	MF	FRA	Khéphren Thuram
20	DF	ALG	Youcef Atal
21	MF	FRA	Alexis Beka Beka

No.	Pos.	Nation	Player
23	DF	SUI	Jordan Lotomba
24	FW	FRA	Gaëtan Laborde
25	DF	FRA	Jean-Clair Todibo
26	DF	FRA	Melvin Bard
28	MF	ALG	Hicham Boudaoui
29	FW	CIV	Nicolas Pépé (on loan from Arsenal)
35	MF	FRA	Badredine Bouanani
42	DF	ITA	Mattia Viti
55	DF	BDI	Youssouf Ndayishimiye
77	GK	ALG	Teddy Boulhendi
90	GK	POL	Marcin Bułka

=== Out on loan ===
Note: Flags indicate national team as defined under FIFA eligibility rules; some limited exceptions apply. Players may hold more than one non-FIFA nationality.

No.	Pos.	Nation	Player
—	DF	CIV	Kouadio Ange Ahoussou (at Châteauroux until 30 June 2023)
—	DF	BRA	Robson Bambu (at Vasco da Gama until 31 December 2023)
—	DF	CAN	Justin Smith (at Quevilly-Rouen until 30 June 2023)
—	MF	CIV	Jean N'Guessan (at Nîmes until 30 June 2023)

No.	Pos.	Nation	Player
—	FW	NED	Calvin Stengs (at Antwerp until 30 June 2023)
—	FW	FRA	Evann Guessand (at Nantes until 30 June 2023)
—	FW	FRA	Alexis Claude-Maurice (at Lens until 30 June 2023)
—	FW	DEN	Kasper Dolberg (at 1899 Hoffenheim until 30 June 2023)

== Transfers ==
=== In ===
Pos.	Player	Transferred from	Fee	Date	Source
GK	(Poland) Marcin Bułka	(France) Paris Saint-Germain	€2M	10 June 2022	
FW	(France) Badredine Bouanani	(France) Lille	Free	7 July 2022	
MF	(Romania) Rareș Ilie	(Romania) Rapid București	€5M	17 July 2022	
MF	(Wales) Aaron Ramsey	(Italy) Juventus	Free	1 August 2022	
DF	(France) Alexis Beka Beka	(Russia) Lokomotiv Moscow	€14M	1 August 2022	
GK	(Denmark) Kasper Schmeichel	(England) Leicester City	€1M	3 August 2022	
DF	(Italy) Mattia Viti	(Italy) Empoli	Undisclosed	3 August 2022	
DF	(England) Joe Bryan	(England) Fulham	Loan	31 August 2022	
MF	(England) Ross Barkley	Free agent	Free	3 September 2022	

=== Out ===
Pos.	Player	Transferred to	Fee	Date	Source
GK	(Argentina) Walter Benítez	(Netherlands) PSV Eindhoven	Free	21 June 2022	
MF	(Ivory Coast) Jean N'Guessan	(France) Nîmes	Loan	28 June 2022	
DF	(Ivory Coast) Ange Ahoussou	(France) Châteauroux	Loan	29 June 2022	
MF	(Canada) Justin Smith	(France) Quevilly-Rouen	Loan	1 July 2022	
FW	(France) Evann Guessand	(France) Nantes	Loan	12 July 2022	
MF	(France) Ihsan Sacko	(France) Avranches	Free	1 August 2022	
FW	(Denmark) Kasper Dolberg	(Spain) Sevilla	Loan	1 September 2022	

== Pre-season and friendlies ==
Win Draw Loss Fixtures

9 July 2022 Friendly	Nice	1–1	Cercle Brugge	Nice
10:00 CEST (UTC+2)	Delort 8'	Report	Nahounou 83' (o.g.)	Stadium: OGC Nice Training Centre; Attendance: 0

15 July 2022 Algarve Cup	Benfica	3–0 (5–4 p)	Nice	Faro/Loulé, Portugal
22:00 CEST (UTC+2)	R. Silva 7'; Otamendi 13'; Gilberto 36'	Report		Stadium: Estádio Algarve; Attendance: 30,305; Referee: Hélder Malheiro (Portugal)
	Penalties
	Yaremchuk (penalty scored); Dias (penalty scored); A. Silva (penalty scored); Vertonghen (penalty scored); Pizzi (penalty scored)		(penalty scored) Claude-Maurice; (penalty scored) Trouillet; (penalty scored) Lotomba; (penalty scored) Brahimi; (penalty missed) Atal
Note: A penalty shoot-out was held after the match in case the competition needed a tiebreaker.

16 July 2022 Algarve Cup	Nice	0–2 (2–3 p)	Fulham	Faro/Loulé, Portugal
21:15 CEST (UTC+2)		Report	Kebano 42' (pen.); Wilson 84' (pen.)	Stadium: Estádio Algarve; Referee: Hélder Carvalho (Portugal)
	Penalties
	Rosario (penalty missed); Bard (penalty scored); Mendy (penalty missed); Gouiri (penalty scored); Dante (penalty missed)		(penalty scored) Wilson; (penalty scored) Pereira; (penalty scored) Tiéhi; (penalty missed) Bryan; (penalty missed) Jasper
Note: A penalty shoot-out was held after the match in case the competition needed a tiebreaker.

23 July 2022 Friendly	Roma	1–1	Nice	Albufeira, Portugal
20:00 CEST (UTC+2)	Spinazzola (yellow card) 20'; Viña (yellow card) 24'; Lemina 54' (o.g.); Zalewski (yellow card) 79'; Cristante (yellow card) 90+4'	Report	Brahimi 41'	Stadium: Estadio Nacional de Albufeira; Attendance: 11,114

30 July 2022 Friendly	Nice	1–0	Torino	Nice
17:00 CEST (UTC+2)	Bard (yellow card) 37'; Dante (yellow card) 63'; Stengs 78'	Report		Stadium: Allianz Riviera; Attendance: 11,032; Referee: Pierre Gaillouste (France)

7 December 2022 Friendly	Sturm Graz	Cancelled	Nice	Spain
15:30 CET (UTC+1)

8 December 2022 Friendly	Nice	4–1	Standard Liège
16:00 CET (UTC+1)	Thuram 32'; Delort 61', 74'; Rosario 80'	Report	Drăguș 71'

17 December 2022 Friendly	Nice	0–3	Atalanta	Nice
13:00 CET (UTC+1)		Report	Højlund 18'; Zapata 22'; Malinovskyi (yellow card) 46'; Scalvini (yellow card) 49'; Boga 90+2'	Stadium: Allianz Riviera; Referee: Eric Wattellier (France)

21 December 2022 Friendly	Tottenham Hotspur	1–1	Nice	London, England
20:00 CET (UTC+1)	Doherty 21'	Report	Mendy 47'	Stadium: Tottenham Hotspur Stadium; Attendance: 9,173; Referee: Simon Hooper (England)

== Competitions ==
=== Overall record ===
Competition	First match	Last match	Starting round	Final position	Record							
Competition	First match	Last match	Starting round	Final position	Pld	W	D	L	GF	GA	GD	Win %
Ligue 1	7 August 2022	3 June 2023	Matchday 1	9th	38	15	13	10	48	37	+11	39.47
Coupe de France	7 January 2023		Round of 64	Round of 64	1	0	0	1	0	1	−1	0.00
UEFA Europa Conference League	18 August 2022	20 April 2023	Play-off round	Quarter-finals	12	5	4	3	17	13	+4	41.67
Total					51	20	17	14	65	51	+14	39.22

Source: Soccerway

=== Ligue 1 ===
==== League table ====
Pos	Team	Pld	W	D	L	GF	GA	GD	Pts
7	Lyon	38	18	8	12	65	47	+18	62
8	Clermont	38	17	8	13	45	49	−4	59
9	Nice	38	15	13	10	48	37	+11	58
10	Lorient	38	15	10	13	52	53	−1	55
11	Reims	38	12	15	11	45	45	0	51

Source: Ligue 1
Rules for classification: 1) Points; 2) Goal difference; 3) Head-to-head points; 4) Head-to-head goal difference; 5) Head-to-head goals scored; 6) Head-to-head away goals scored; 7) Goals scored; 8) Away goals scored; 9) Fair-play points (Note: Head-to-head record is used only after all the matches between the teams in question have been played).

==== Results summary ====
Overall								Home						Away					
Pld	W	D	L	GF	GA	GD	Pts	W	D	L	GF	GA	GD	W	D	L	GF	GA	GD
38	15	13	10	48	37	+11	58	7	7	5	24	18	+6	8	6	5	24	19	+5

Source: Ligue 1

==== Results by round ====
Round	1	2	3	4	5	6	7	8	9	10	11	12	13	14	15	16	17	18	19	20	21	22	23	24	25	26	27	28	29	30	31	32	33	34	35	36	37	38
Ground	A	H	A	H	A	H	A	H	A	H	A	H	A	H	A	H	A	H	A	H	A	A	H	H	A	H	A	H	A	H	A	H	A	H	A	H	A	H
Result	D	D	L	L	W	L	W	L	L	W	D	D	W	W	D	D	L	W	D	W	W	W	W	D	W	D	D	D	D	L	L	L	W	W	L	D	W	W
Position	9	12	16	18	15	16	12	13	13	13	13	12	10	10	9	9	11	10	10	10	8	8	7	8	7	7	7	7	8	9	9	10	9	8	10	9	9	9

Source: Ligue 1
A = Away; H = Home; W = Win; D = Draw; L = Loss

==== Matches ====
The league fixtures were announced on 17 June 2022.

7 August 2022 1	Toulouse	1–1	Nice	Toulouse
13:00 CEST (UTC+2)	Dallinga 20'; Keben (yellow card) 86'	Report	Rosario (yellow card) 63'; Dante (yellow card) 65'; Ramsey 78'	Stadium: Stadium de Toulouse; Attendance: 20,567; Referee: Johan Hamel

14 August 2022 2	Nice	1–1	Strasbourg	Nice
17:05 CEST (UTC+2)	Delort 35' (pen.); Rosario (yellow card) 77'	Report	Nyamsi (yellow card) 34'; Le Marchand (yellow card) 45+1'; Delaine (yellow card) 47'; Gameiro 56'; Thomasson (yellow card) 67'	Stadium: Allianz Riviera; Attendance: 24,707; Referee: Hakim Ben El Hadj

21 August 2022 3	Clermont	1–0	Nice	Clermont-Ferrand
15:00 CEST (UTC+2)	Khaoui 5'; Gonalons (yellow card) 59'	Report	Todibo (yellow card) 60' (yellow-red card) 81'; Lemina (red card) 79'	Stadium: Stade Gabriel Montpied; Attendance: 11,500; Referee: Thomas Léonard

28 August 2022 4	Nice	0–3	Marseille	Nice
15:00 CEST (UTC+2)	Beka Beka (yellow card) 56'	Report	Sánchez 9', 41'; Tavares 36', (yellow card) 70'	Stadium: Allianz Riviera; Attendance: 31,418; Referee: François Letexier

31 August 2022 5	Lille	1–2	Nice	Villeneuve-d'Ascq
21:00 CEST (UTC+2)	Bamba 20', (yellow card) 85'	Report	Delort 22' (pen.); Rosario (yellow card) 26'; Pépé 29' (pen.); Bard (yellow card) 73'; Atal (yellow card) 81'; Thuram (yellow card) 90+2'	Stadium: Stade Pierre-Mauroy; Attendance: 30,254; Referee: Jérémy Stinat

4 September 2022 6	Nice	0–1	Monaco	Nice
20:45 CEST (UTC+2)	Rosario (yellow card) 50'; Lotomba (yellow card) 90+4'	Report	Camara (yellow card) 38'; Embolo 69'	Stadium: Allianz Riviera; Attendance: 24,125; Referee: Benoît Millot

11 September 2022 7	Ajaccio	0–1	Nice	Ajaccio
15:00 CEST (UTC+2)	Marchetti (yellow card) 40'	Report	Todibo (yellow card) 53'; Dante (yellow card) 58'; Lotomba (yellow card) 61'; Delort 65'; Bard (yellow card) 80'; Barkley (yellow card) 89'	Stadium: Stade François Coty; Attendance: 7,068; Referee: Eric Wattellier

18 September 2022 8	Nice	0–1	Angers	Nice
17:05 CEST (UTC+2)	Todibo (red card) 1'	Report	Hountondji (yellow card) 32'; Boufal (yellow card) 40' (yellow-red card) 62'; Bentaleb 43'; Fofana (yellow card) 87'	Stadium: Allianz Riviera; Attendance: 18,545; Referee: Bastien Dechepy

1 October 2022 9	Paris Saint-Germain	2–1	Nice	Paris
21:00 CEST (UTC+2)	Messi 28'; Mbappé 83'; Sarabia (yellow card) 90+1'	Report	Dante (yellow card) 27'; Laborde 47'	Stadium: Parc des Princes; Attendance: 47,000; Referee: Jérôme Brisard

9 October 2022 10	Nice	3–2	Troyes	Nice
15:00 CEST (UTC+2)	Viti 2'; Delort 37' (pen.); Pépé 50'; Bryan (yellow card) 56'	Report	Chavalerin 82'; Conté 90'; M. Baldé (yellow card) 90+3'	Stadium: Allianz Riviera; Attendance: 18,053; Referee: Johan Hamel

16 October 2022 11	Auxerre	1–1	Nice	Auxerre
15:00 CEST (UTC+2)	Da Costa 42'	Report	Delort 20'	Stadium: Stade de l'Abbé-Deschamps; Attendance: 14,125; Referee: Eric Wattellier

23 October 2022 12	Nice	1–1	Nantes	Nice
17:05 CEST (UTC+2)	Todibo (yellow card) 60'; Bryan (yellow card) 68'; Bard (yellow card) 81'; Pépé 90+7' (pen.)	Report	Ganago 49'; Sissoko (yellow card) 84'; Lafont (yellow card) 90+4' (yellow-red card) 90+9'; Bamba (red card) 90+8'; Moutoussamy (yellow card) 90+9'	Stadium: Allianz Riviera; Attendance: 20,166; Referee: François Letexier

30 October 2022 13	Lorient	1–2	Nice	Lorient
17:05 CET (UTC+1)	Ouattara 18'	Report	Lemina (yellow card) 58'; Atal 61'; Laborde 69'	Stadium: Stade du Moustoir; Attendance: 16,034; Referee: Clément Turpin

6 November 2022 14	Nice	1–0	Brest	Nice
15:00 CET (UTC+1)	Laborde 54'; Boudaoui (yellow card) 90+1'	Report	Le Douaron (yellow card) 59'	Stadium: Allianz Riviera; Attendance: 19,035; Referee: Jérémy Stinat

11 November 2022 15	Lyon	1–1	Nice	Lyon
21:00 CET (UTC+1)	Tagliafico (yellow card) 34'; Lacazette 89' (pen.)	Report	Pépé 38' (pen.)	Stadium: Groupama Stadium; Attendance: 57,000; Referee: Eric Wattellier

29 December 2022 16	Nice	0–0	Lens	Nice
21:00 CET (UTC+1)	Pépé (yellow card) 78'; Diop (yellow card) 78'	Report	Saïd (yellow card) 45+1'; Machado (yellow card) 60'; Gradit (yellow card) 78'	Stadium: Allianz Riviera; Attendance: 24,672; Referee: Benoît Millot

2 January 2023 17	Rennes	2–1	Nice	Rennes
21:00 CET (UTC+1)	Terrier 5'; Bourigeaud (yellow card) 79', (goal) 89'	Report	Barkley 21'; Bard (yellow card) 85'	Stadium: Roazhon Park; Attendance: 27,427; Referee: Thomas Léonard

11 January 2023 18	Nice	6–1	Montpellier	Nice
21:00 CET (UTC+1)	Pépé 15', 56', (yellow card) 63'; Thuram 35'; Delort 75'; Barkley 82', 85'	Report	Khazri (yellow card) 63'; Savanier 80'	Stadium: Allianz Riviera; Attendance: 17,500; Referee: Bastien Dechepy

15 January 2023 19	Reims	0–0	Nice	Reims
19:00 CET (UTC+1)	Cajuste (yellow card) 51'	Report	Lotomba (yellow card) 90+5'	Stadium: Stade Auguste-Delaune; Attendance: 11,383; Referee: François Letexier

29 January 2023 20	Nice	1–0	Lille	Nice
13:00 CET (UTC+1)	Dante (yellow card) 16'; Laborde 34'; Boudaoui (yellow card) 68'; Thuram (yellow card) 72'	Report	Ang. Gomes (yellow card) 85'; Djaló (yellow card) 90+4'	Stadium: Allianz Riviera; Attendance: 22,126; Referee: Eric Wattellier

1 February 2023 21	Lens	0–1	Nice	Lens
17:00 CET (UTC+1)		Report	Laborde 57'; Rosario (yellow card) 76'; Ramsey (yellow card) 79'	Stadium: Stade Bollaert-Delelis; Attendance: 37,437; Referee: Thomas Léonard

5 February 2023 22	Marseille	1–3	Nice	Marseille
20:45 CET (UTC+1)	Malinovskyi 60'	Report	Diop 38'; Laborde 44'; Ndayishimiye (yellow card) 59'; Brahimi 85'	Stadium: Stade Vélodrome; Attendance: 65,234; Referee: Clément Turpin

10 February 2023 23	Nice	3–0	Ajaccio	Nice
21:00 CET (UTC+1)	Dante 2'; Boudaoui (yellow card) 56'; Brahimi 68', 89'	Report		Stadium: Allianz Riviera; Attendance: 20,163; Referee: Stéphanie Frappart

18 February 2023 24	Nice	0–0	Reims	Nice
17:00 CET (UTC+1)	Lotomba (yellow card) 45'	Report	Lopy (yellow card) 87'	Stadium: Allianz Riviera; Attendance: 18,102; Referee: Marc Bollengier

26 February 2023 25	Monaco	0–3	Nice	Monaco
17:05 CET (UTC+1)		Report	Moffi 8', 26'; Ramsey (yellow card) 28'; Thuram 43'	Stadium: Stade Louis II; Attendance: 9,000; Referee: Benoît Bastien

3 March 2023 26	Nice	1–1	Auxerre	Nice
21:00 CET (UTC+1)	Laborde (penalty missed) 42', 45+1'	Report	Hein 36'; Zedadka (yellow card) 41'	Stadium: Allianz Riviera; Attendance: 21,133; Referee: Bastien Dechepy

12 March 2023 27	Nantes	2–2	Nice	Nantes
15:00 CET (UTC+1)	Moutoussamy (yellow card) 29'; Sissoko 31'; Blas (penalty missed) 35'; Mohamed 88'	Report	Moffi 5'; Bard (yellow card) 30'; Ndayishimiye 71'	Stadium: Stade de la Beaujoire; Attendance: 33,568; Referee: Willy Delajod

19 March 2023 28	Nice	1–1	Lorient	Nice
15:00 CET (UTC+1)	Laborde 78'	Report	Meïté 30'; Mannone (yellow card) 74'; Silva (yellow card) 89', (red card) 90+2'	Stadium: Allianz Riviera; Attendance: 20,762; Referee: Ruddy Buquet

2 April 2023 29	Angers	1–1	Nice	Angers
15:00 CEST (UTC+2)	Niane 15'; Abdelli (yellow card) 90+3'	Report	Moffi 4'; Ndayishimiye (yellow card) 74'	Stadium: Stade Raymond Kopa; Attendance: 6,649; Referee: Eric Wattellier

8 April 2023 30	Nice	0–2	Paris Saint-Germain	Nice
21:00 CEST (UTC+2)	Thuram (yellow card) 88'	Report	Messi 26'; Ramos 76'	Stadium: Allianz Riviera; Attendance: 34,456; Referee: Jérémie Pignard

16 April 2023 31	Brest	1–0	Nice	Brest
15:00 CEST (UTC+2)	Le Douaron 12'; Magnetti (yellow card) 58'	Report	Amraoui (yellow card) 20'; Boudaoui (yellow card) 76'; Bryan (yellow card) 85'	Stadium: Stade Francis-Le Blé; Attendance: 12,615; Referee: Benoît Bastien

23 April 2023 32	Nice	1–2	Clermont	Nice
15:00 CEST (UTC+2)	Bard (yellow card) 30'; Laborde 41'	Report	Cham 37'; Caufriez (yellow card) 49'; Kyei (yellow card) 74'; Khaoui 83'	Stadium: Allianz Riviera; Attendance: 20,578; Referee: Benoît Millot

30 April 2023 33	Troyes	0–1	Nice	Troyes
15:00 CEST (UTC+2)		Report	Boudaoui 1'; Moffi (yellow card) 50'; Ramsey (yellow card) 63'	Stadium: Stade de l'Aube; Attendance: 8,399; Referee: Eric Wattelier

6 May 2023 34	Nice	2–1	Rennes	Nice
17:00 CEST (UTC+2)	Laborde 50'; Moffi 72'	Report	Traoré (yellow card) 55'; Bourigeaud 78'	Stadium: Allianz Riviera; Attendance: 22,601; Referee: Willy Delajod

14 May 2023 35	Strasbourg	2–0	Nice	Strasbourg
17:00 CEST (UTC+2)	Diallo 1', 59' (pen.); Sissoko (yellow card) 90'	Report	Dante (yellow card) 73'	Stadium: Stade de la Meinau; Attendance: 25,147; Referee: Jérémy Stinat

21 May 2023 36	Nice	0–0	Toulouse	Nice
15:00 CEST (UTC+2)	Beka Beka (yellow card) 32'; Moffi (yellow card) 72'	Report	Nicolaisen (yellow card) 23'; Spierings (yellow card) 90+3'	Stadium: Allianz Riviera; Attendance: 20,041; Referee: Jérémie Pignard

27 May 2023 37	Montpellier	2–3	Nice	Montpellier
21:00 CEST (UTC+2)	Savanier 6', 16' (pen.)	Report	Barkley 52'; Boudaoui (yellow card) 62'; Laborde 66', 78'; Rosario (yellow card) 87'; Dante (yellow card) 89'	Stadium: Stade de la Mosson; Attendance: 16,340; Referee: Benoît Millot

3 June 2023 38	Nice	3–1	Lyon	Nice
21:00 CEST (UTC+2)	Boateng 5' (o.g.); Laborde 28'; Moffi 33'; Lukeba (yellow card) 49'	Report	Jeffinho 41'	Stadium: Allianz Riviera; Attendance: 25,243; Referee: Eric Wattellier

=== Coupe de France ===
7 January 2023 Round of 64	Le Puy Foot 43 Auvergne	1–0	Nice	Le Puy-en-Velay
18:00 CET (UTC+1)	Ben Fredj 3'	Report		Stadium: Stade Charles Massot; Attendance: 3,800; Referee: Clément Turpin

=== UEFA Europa Conference League ===
==== Play-off round ====
The draw for the play-off round was made on 1 August 2022.

18 August 2022 First leg	Maccabi Tel Aviv (Israel)	1–0	(France) Nice	Tel Aviv, Israel
19:00 CEST (UTC+2)	Perica 74', (yellow card) 90+1'	Report	Ilie (yellow card) 51'; Brahimi (yellow card) 73'; Bard (yellow card) 90+3'	Stadium: Bloomfield Stadium; Attendance: 26,871; Referee: Allard Lindhout (Netherlands)

25 August 2022 Second leg	Nice (France)	2–0 (a.e.t.) (2–1 agg.)	(Israel) Maccabi Tel Aviv	Nice, France
20:00 CEST (UTC+2)	Claude-Maurice 25'; Gouiri (yellow card) 80' (yellow-red card) 100'; Dante (yellow card) 100'; Bard (yellow card) 108'; Beka Beka 113'; Thuram (yellow card) 120+3'	Report	Kanichowsky (yellow card) 24'; Glazer (yellow card) 103'	Stadium: Allianz Riviera; Attendance: 20,117; Referee: Sascha Stegemann (Germany)

==== Group stage ====
The draw for the group stage was held on 26 August 2022.

Pos	Team	Pld	W	D	L	GF	GA	GD	Pts	Qualification	NCE	PRT	KLN	SVK
1	(France) Nice	6	2	3	1	8	7	+1	9 (Note: Head-to-head points: Nice 4, Partizan 1.)	Advance to round of 16	—	2–1	1–1	1–2
2	(Serbia) Partizan	6	2	3	1	9	7	+2	9	Advance to knockout round play-offs	1–1	—	2–0	1–1
3	(Germany) 1. FC Köln	6	2	2	2	8	8	0	8		2–2	0–1	—	4–2
4	(Czech Republic) Slovácko	6	1	2	3	8	11	−3	5		0–1	3–3	0–1	—

Source: UEFA
Rules for classification: Group stage tiebreakers
Notes:

8 September 2022 1	Nice (France)	1–1	(Germany) 1. FC Köln	Nice, France
18:45 CEST (UTC+2)	Boudaoui (yellow card) 39'; Delort 62' (pen.)	Report	Tigges 19'; Hector (yellow card) 59'; Hübers (yellow card) 61'	Stadium: Allianz Riviera; Attendance: 19,000; Referee: Luís Godinho (Portugal)

15 September 2022 2	Partizan (Serbia)	1–1	(France) Nice	Belgrade, Serbia
21:00 CEST (UTC+2)	Traoré (yellow card) 52'; Diabaté 60'	Report	Bryan 2'; Boudaoui (yellow card) 79'	Stadium: Partizan Stadium; Attendance: 9,126; Referee: Andrew Madley (England)

6 October 2022 3	Slovácko (Czech Republic)	0–1	(France) Nice	Uherské Hradiště, Czech Republic
18:45 CEST (UTC+2)	Trávník (yellow card) 30'	Report	Dante (yellow card) 24'; Pépé 54'; Bułka (yellow card) 90+8'	Stadium: Městský fotbalový stadion Miroslava Valenty; Attendance: 7,447; Referee: Julian Weinberger (Austria)

13 October 2022 4	Nice (France)	1–2	(Czech Republic) Slovácko	Nice, France
21:00 CEST (UTC+2)	Diop 14'; Todibo (red card) 85'; Dante (yellow card) 85'	Report	Doski (yellow card) 66'; Sinyavskiy (yellow card) 72'; Tomič 75'; Reinberk 87'; Kozák (yellow card) 90+3'; Nguyen (yellow card) 90+4'	Stadium: Allianz Riviera; Attendance: 0 Referee: Iwan Griffith (Wales)
Note: The match was played behind closed doors due to violent clashes between rival supporters during Nice's home match against 1. FC Köln.

27 October 2022 5	Nice (France)	2–1	(Serbia) Partizan	Nice, France
18:45 CEST (UTC+2)	Pépé 29'; Lemina 77', (yellow card) 90+2'	Report	Gomes 74'	Stadium: Allianz Riviera; Attendance: 11,324; Referee: István Vad (Hungary)

3 November 2022 6	1. FC Köln (Germany)	2–2	(France) Nice	Cologne, Germany
21:00 CET (UTC+1)	Huseinbašić 48'; Hübers (yellow card) 55'; Duda 60'; Maina (yellow card) 69'	Report	Laborde 40'; Brahimi 43'	Stadium: RheinEnergieStadion; Attendance: 47,000; Referee: César Soto Grado (Spain)

==== Knockout phase ====
===== Round of 16 =====
The draw for the round of 16 was held on 24 February 2023.

9 March 2023 First leg	Sheriff Tiraspol (Moldova)	0–1	(France) Nice	Chișinău, Moldova
19:45 EET (UTC+2)	Kpozo (yellow card) 12'; Akanbi (yellow card) 62'; Zohouri (yellow card) 86'	Report	Dante (yellow card) 44'; Amraoui 45+3'; Thuram (yellow card) 64'; Rosario (yellow card) 73'	Stadium: Zimbru Stadium; Attendance: 5,326; Referee: Aliyar Aghayev (Azerbaijan)
Note: Sheriff Tiraspol played their home match at the Zimbru Stadium in Chișinău, instead of their regular stadium, the Sheriff Stadium in Tiraspol, due to Transnistria's involvement in the Russian invasion of Ukraine.

16 March 2023 Second leg	Nice (France)	3–1 (4–1 agg.)	(Moldova) Sheriff Tiraspol	Nice, France
21:00 CET (UTC+1)	Laborde 30'; Moffi 53'; Brahimi 79'	Report	Tapsoba 54'	Stadium: Allianz Riviera; Attendance: 23,070; Referee: Lawrence Visser (Belgium)

===== Quarter-finals =====
The draw for the quarter-finals was held on 17 March 2023.

13 April 2023 First leg	Basel (Switzerland)	2–2	(France) Nice	Basel, Switzerland
21:00 CEST (UTC+2)	Amraoui (yellow card) 18'; Amdouni 26' (pen.), 71'; López (yellow card) 79'	Report	Todibo (yellow card) 24'; Moffi 38', 45+1'	Stadium: St. Jakob-Park; Attendance: 21,277; Referee: Glenn Nyberg (Sweden)

20 April 2023 Second leg	Nice (France)	1–2 (a.e.t.) (3–4 agg.)	(Switzerland) Basel	Nice, France
21:00 CEST (UTC+2)	Laborde 10'; Dante (yellow card) 38'; Boudaoui (yellow card) 56'; Bard (yellow card) 59'; Ramsey (yellow card) 90+4'; Pépé (yellow card) 90+5'; Thuram (yellow card) 105+1'	Report	Ndoye (yellow card) 32'; Augustin 86'; Nuhu 99'; Lang (yellow card) 116'	Stadium: Allianz Riviera; Attendance: 29,716; Referee: Serdar Gözübüyük (Netherlands)

== Statistics ==
=== Appearances and goals ===
No.	Pos	Nat	Player	Total		Ligue 1		Coupe de France		UEFA Europe Conference League	
No.	Pos	Nat	Player	Apps	Goals	Apps	Goals	Apps	Goals	Apps	Goals
Goalkeepers
1	GK	(Denmark) DEN	Kasper Schmeichel	46	0	36	0	1	0	9	0
77	GK	(Algeria) ALG	Teddy Boulhendi	0	0	0	0	0	0	0	0
90	GK	(Poland) POL	Marcin Bułka	5	0	2	0	0	0	3	0
Defenders
4	DF	(Brazil) BRA	Dante	49	1	37	1	1	0	11	0
15	DF	(England) ENG	Joe Bryan	10	1	2+4	0	0+1	0	3	1
20	DF	(Algeria) ALG	Youcef Atal	25	1	8+10	1	0	0	6+1	0
23	DF	(Switzerland) SUI	Jordan Lotomba	40	0	27+6	0	0	0	4+3	0
25	DF	(France) FRA	Jean-Clair Todibo	46	0	33+1	0	1	0	11	0
26	DF	(France) FRA	Melvin Bard	44	0	28+5	0	1	0	7+3	0
33	DF	(Italy) ITA	Antoine Mendy	15	0	7+4	0	1	0	1+2	0
38	DF	(Morocco) MAR	Ayoub Amraoui	11	1	3+4	0	0	0	2+2	1
42	DF	(Italy) ITA	Mattia Viti	12	1	7+2	1	0	0	1+2	0
55	DF	(Burundi) BDI	Youssouf Ndayishimiye	14	1	6+4	1	0	0	4	0
Midfielders
8	MF	(Netherlands) NED	Pablo Rosario	39	0	17+14	0	0	0	4+4	0
10	MF	(France) FRA	Sofiane Diop	28	2	14+8	1	1	0	3+2	1
11	MF	(England) ENG	Ross Barkley	28	4	9+18	4	1	0	0	0
14	MF	(Algeria) ALG	Billal Brahimi	36	5	21+4	3	1	0	3+7	2
16	MF	(Wales) WAL	Aaron Ramsey	34	1	18+9	1	0	0	5+2	0
19	MF	(France) FRA	Khéphren Thuram	48	2	30+5	2	1	0	12	0
21	MF	(France) FRA	Alexis Beka Beka	22	1	7+7	0	0+1	0	1+6	1
28	MF	(Algeria) ALG	Hicham Boudaoui	36	1	22+5	1	1	0	8	0
31	MF	(France) FRA	Théo Trinker	1	0	0+1	0	0	0	0	0
35	MF	(France) FRA	Badredine Bouanani	20	0	9+10	0	0	0	0+1	0
37	MF	(France) FRA	Reda Belahyane	6	0	1+3	0	0	0	0+2	0
40	MF	(France) FRA	Andréa Dacourt	1	0	0+1	0	0	0	0	0
Forwards
9	FW	(Nigeria) NGR	Terem Moffi	20	9	15+1	6	0	0	4	3
24	FW	(France) FRA	Gaëtan Laborde	44	16	28+5	13	0+1	0	9+1	3
29	FW	(Ivory Coast) CIV	Nicolas Pépé	28	8	17+2	6	1	0	5+3	2
Players transferred out during the season
5	DF	(Austria) AUT	Flavius Daniliuc	2	0	1+1	0	0	0	0	0
18	MF	(Romania) ROU	Rareș Ilie	8	0	2+2	0	0	0	3+1	0
22	MF	(Netherlands) NED	Calvin Stengs	6	0	3+1	0	0	0	1+1	0
99	MF	(Gabon) GAB	Mario Lemina	22	1	11+3	0	1	0	7	1
7	FW	(Algeria) ALG	Andy Delort	18	1	9+5	0	0	0	4	1
10	FW	(France) FRA	Alexis Claude-Maurice	3	7	1+1	6	0	0	1	1
11	FW	(Algeria) ALG	Amine Gouiri	5	0	3	0	0	0	0+2	0

Last updated: 3 June 2023
Source: Competitions
