= Alexis Beka Beka =

French footballer (born 2001)

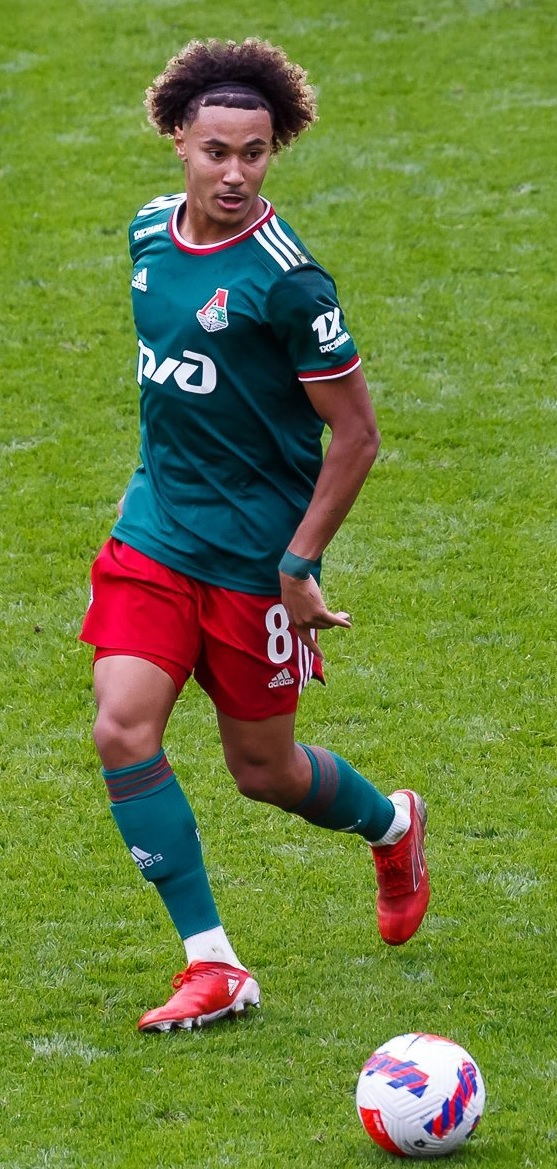
- Beka Beka with Lokomotiv Moscow in 2021

Personal information
- Full name: Alexis Adelin Beka Beka
- Date of birth: 29 March 2001 (age 25)
- Place of birth: Paris, France
- Height: 1.78 m (5 ft 10 in)
- Position: Defensive midfielder

Team information
- Current team: Aarau
- Number: 80

Youth career
- 2007–2008: Verson
- 2008–2019: Caen

Senior career*
Years	Team	Apps	(Gls)
2018–2020	Caen B	16	(1)
2019–2021	Caen	30	(1)
2021–2022	Lokomotiv Moscow	21	(0)
2022–2024	Nice	14	(0)
2025	Caen B	8	(1)
2025–2026	La Louvière	7	(1)
2026–	Aarau	4	(1)

International career
2017	France U17	1	(0)
2019	France U18	6	(0)
2019	France U19	2	(0)
2021	France Olympic	4	(0)
- * Club domestic league appearances and goals as of 5 September 2026

Alexis Adelin Beka Beka (born 29 March 2001) is a French professional footballer who plays as a defensive midfielder for Swiss club Aarau.

== Club career ==
Beka Beka made his professional debut for Caen on 20 December 2019 in a 0–0 Ligue 2 draw against Clermont. He signed his first professional contract with the club on 9 June 2020.

On 23 August 2021, Beka Beka signed a five-year contract with Russian Premier League club Lokomotiv Moscow.

On 1 August 2022, Beka Beka signed a five-year deal with Ligue 1 club Nice for a reported fee of €14 million. His contract with the club was terminated on 16 August 2024.

On 22 February 2025, Beka Beka made his first appearance since 2023, coming on as a substitute for Caen's reserve team in a 4–1 defeat against Grand-Quevilly FC in the Championnat National 3.

In the summer of 2025, Beka Beka signed a three-year contract with Belgian club La Louvière.

On 19 August 2026, Beka Beka moved to Aarau in the Swiss second tier.

== International career ==
Beka Beka is a French youth international footballer. He was part of France's Olympic team at the 2020 Summer Olympics.

== Personal life ==
Born in France, Beka Beka holds both French and Congolese nationality.

On 29 September 2023, Beka Beka was involved in a mental health incident in Nice, during which he threatened to harm himself from the Magnan viaduct. Emergency services, including fire and medical personnel, intervened, and he was safely removed from the scene. The viaduct is approximately 100 meters high and the incident caused temporary traffic disruptions on the A8 autoroute.

== Career statistics ==
As of match played 13 January 2026

Appearances and goals by club, season and competition
Club	Season	League			Cup (Note: Includes Coupe de France, Russian Cup and Belgian Cup)		Other		Total	
Club	Season	Division	Apps	Goals	Apps	Goals	Apps	Goals	Apps	Goals
Caen B	2018–19	Championnat National 3	9	0	—		—		9	0
Caen B	2019–20	Championnat National 3	7	1	—		—		7	1
Caen B	Total		16	1	—		—		16	1
Caen	2019–20	Ligue 2	5	0	1	0	—		6	0
Caen	2020–21	Ligue 2	25	1	2	0	—		27	1
Caen	Total		30	1	3	0	—		33	1
Lokomotiv Moscow	2021–22	Russian Premier League	19	0	1	0	6 (Note: Appearances in the UEFA Europa League)	0	26	0
Lokomotiv Moscow	2022–23	Russian Premier League	2	0	—		—		2	0
Lokomotiv Moscow	Total		21	0	1	0	6	0	28	0
Nice	2022–23	Ligue 1	14	0	1	0	7 (Note: Appearances in the UEFA Europa Conference League)	1	22	1
Nice	2023–24	Ligue 1	0	0	0	0	—		0	0
Nice	Total		14	0	1	0	7	1	22	1
Caen B	2024–25	Championnat National 3	8	1	—		—		8	1
La Louvière	2025–26	Belgian Pro League	3	1	2	0	—		5	1
Career total			92	4	7	0	13	1	112	5
