= Kévin Mbala =

French footballer (born 2001)

Personal information
- Full name: Kévin Zintoni Mbala
- Date of birth: 17 January 2001 (age 25)
- Place of birth: Villeneuve-Saint-Georges, France
- Height: 1.90 m (6 ft 3 in)
- Position: Forward

Team information
- Current team: Borgo
- Number: 21

Youth career
- 2010–2012: Villeneuvois
- 2012–2014: Maccabi Paris
- 2014: Villejuif
- 2014–2015: Maccabi Paris
- 2015: Paris Valenton
- 2015–2017: Créteil
- 2017–2020: Caen

Senior career*
Years	Team	Apps	(Gls)
2019–2020	Caen B	10	(0)
2021–2022	Caen	4	(0)
2021–2022	→ Bastia-Borgo (loan)	22	(1)
2022–2023	Paris FC	6	(0)
2022–2023	Paris FC B	16	(11)
2023–2025	Versailles	18	(0)
2025	Andrézieux	11	(0)
2026	CSM Olimpia Satu Mare	4	(2)
2026–	Borgo	5	(1)

International career
2017	France U17	1	(0)
- * Club domestic league appearances and goals as of 17 October 2026

Kévin Zintoni Mbala (born 17 January 2001) is a French professional footballer who plays as a forward for Championnat National 1 club Borgo.

== Club career ==
Mbala made his professional debut with Caen in a 1–1 Ligue 2 tie with Dunkerque on 20 April 2021.

On 24 June 2021, Mbala signed his first professional contract with Caen, a deal lasting until 2022. He was subsequently loaned to Championnat National side Bastia-Borgo until the end of the season.

== International career ==
Mbala represented the France U17s in a 4–0 friendly loss to the Iran U17s on 28 September 2017.

== Personal life ==
Born in France, Mbala is of DR Congolese descent.
