= Aloys Fouda =

Cameroonian footballer

Personal information
- Date of birth: 1 May 2000 (age 26)
- Place of birth: Ebolowa, Cameroon
- Height: 1.81 m (5 ft 11 in)
- Position: Defender

Youth career
- –2018: Brasseries Du Cameroun
- 2018–2020: Caen

Senior career*
Years	Team	Apps	(Gls)
2019–2022	Caen II	29	(0)
2021–2022	Caen	15	(0)
2022	→ Chambly (loan)	10	(0)
2022–2024	Châteauroux	40	(0)
2022–2024	Châteauroux II	16	(1)
- * Club domestic league appearances and goals as of 16 June 2024

Aloys Fouda (born 1 May 2000) is a Cameroonian professional football player.

== Club career ==
Aloys Fouda made his professional debut for Caen on the 10 February 2021 starting as a right-back in the Coupe de France game against Paris Saint-Germain.

On 1 February 2022, Fouda joined Chambly on loan.

On 6 July 2022, Fouda moved to Châteauroux on a two-year contract.
