= Evens Joseph =

French footballer (born 1999)

Personal information
- Date of birth: 16 July 1999 (age 27)
- Place of birth: Neuilly-sur-Marne, France
- Height: 1.78 m (5 ft 10 in)
- Position: Forward

Team information
- Current team: Chantilly
- Number: 13

Youth career
- 2007–2011: Neuilly-sur-Marne
- 2011–2017: Caen

Senior career*
| Years | Team | Apps | (Gls) |
| 2017–2022 | Caen B | 42 | (4) |
| 2018–2022 | Caen | 21 | (0) |
| 2020 | → Boulogne (loan) | 5 | (0) |
| 2020–2021 | → Boulogne (loan) | 22 | (4) |
| 2022 | Sète | 13 | (0) |
| 2023 | Lille B | 15 | (3) |
| 2024– | Chantilly | 7 | (0) |

International career
| 2016 | France U16 | 5 | (4) |
| 2016 | France U17 | 1 | (0) |
- * Club domestic league appearances and goals as of 23 November 2024

Evens Joseph (born 16 July 1999) is a French professional footballer who plays as a forward for Championnat National 1 club Chantilly.

== Club career ==
On 22 November 2017, Joseph signed his first professional contract with Caen. Joseph made his professional debut for Caen in a 1-0 Ligue 1 loss to Monaco on 24 November 2018.

On 31 January 2020, Joseph signed on loan with Championnat National side Boulogne for the remainder of the 2019–20 season. He rejoined Boulogne for a second loan spell on 13 August 2020, for the 2020–21 season, with an option to buy.

On 4 February 2022, Joseph signed with Sète.

== Personal life ==
Born in metropolitan France, Joseph is of Martiniquais descent.
