= Loup Hervieu =

French association football player (born 2000)

Personal information
- Date of birth: 5 April 2000 (age 26)
- Place of birth: Granville, France
- Height: 1.77 m (5 ft 10 in)
- Position: Midfielder

Team information
- Current team: Cannes
- Number: 4

Youth career
- La Bréhalaise
- Granville
- 2017–2019: Caen

Senior career*
Years	Team	Apps	(Gls)
2018–2022	Caen II	35	(0)
2020–2022	Caen	7	(0)
2022	Mandel United	14	(0)
2022–2023	Guingamp II	21	(0)
2023–2026	Fleury	75	(3)
2026–	Cannes	0	(0)
- * Club domestic league appearances and goals as of 23 June 2026

Loup Hervieu (born 5 April 2000) is a French professional footballer who plays as a midfielder for Ligue 3 club Cannes.

== Career ==
A youth product of Caen, Hervieu signed his first professional contract with the club on 28 May 2019. He made his professional debut with in 1–0 Ligue 2 win over Ajaccio on 29 August 2020.

On 12 January 2022, Hervieu signed for Belgian club Mandel United.
