= Fabrice Vandeputte =

French football manager (born 1969)

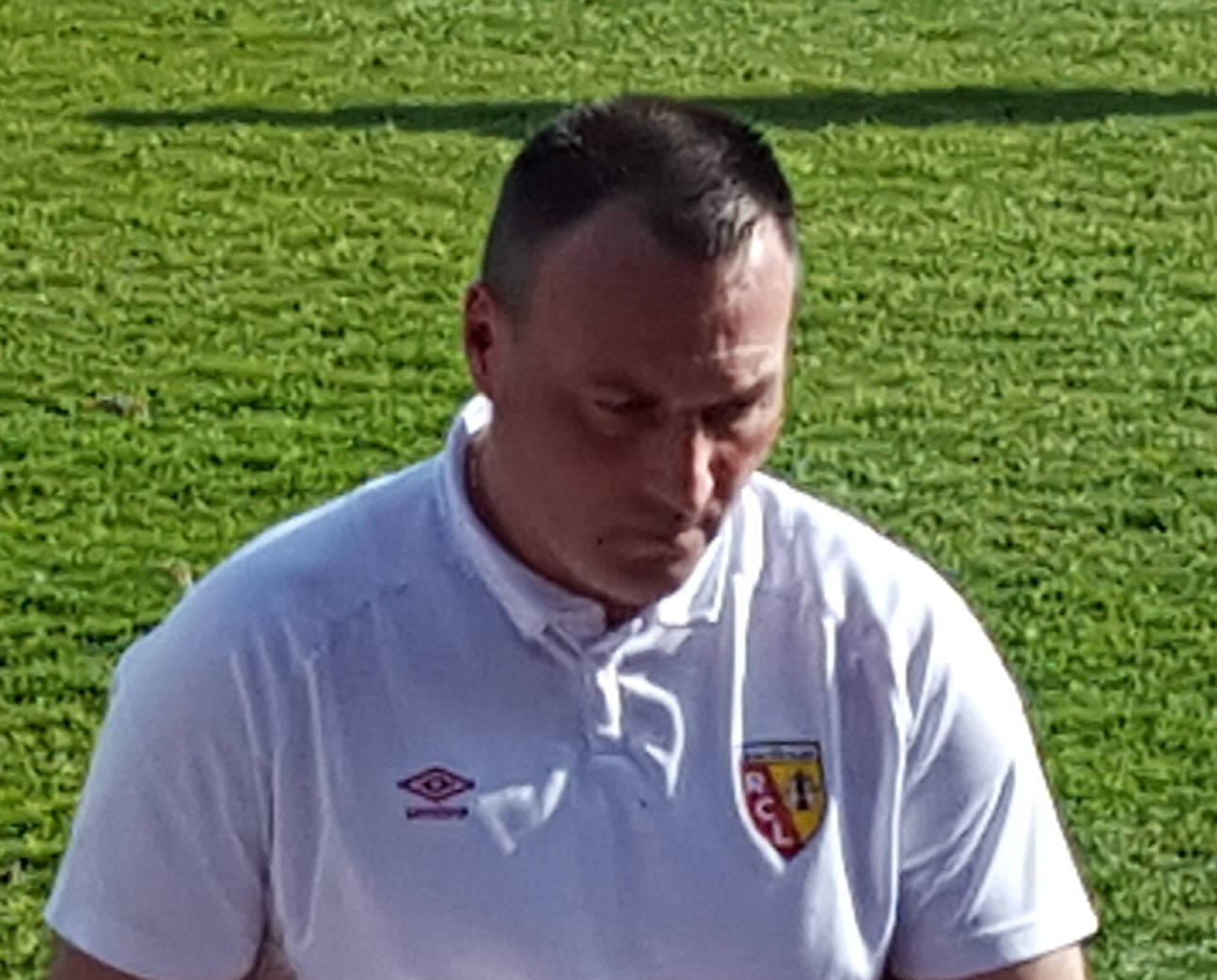
- Vandeputte with Lens U19 in 2016

Personal information
- Full name: Fabrice Vandeputte
- Date of birth: 22 September 1969 (age 57)
- Place of birth: Mazingarbe, France
- Height: 1.75 m (5 ft 9 in)
- Position: Midfielder

Youth career
- Standard FC de Montataire
- Lille

Senior career*
Years	Team	Apps	(Gls)
1985–1989	Lille B		
1989–1993	Louhans-Cuiseaux	109	(14)
1993–1994	Beauvais	23	(0)
1994–1997	Saint-Leu		
1997–1998	Stade Montois		
1998–2002	Chantilly		

Managerial career
- 1998–2002: Chantilly
- 2003–2004: Louhans-Cuiseaux U19
- 2004–2008: Dijon B
- 2012–2015: Sochaux B
- 2015–2017: Lens U19
- 2017–2018: Bourg-en-Bresse B
- 2018: Caen B
- 2018–2019: Caen (assistant)
- 2019–2021: Caen B
- 2021: Caen
- 2021–2022: Caen B
- 2022–2023: Marseille B (assistant)
- 2023: Marseille B
- * Club domestic league appearances and goals

Fabrice Vandeputte (born 22 September 1969) is a French professional football manager and former player. As a player, he was a midfielder.

== Club career ==
Vandeputte, who was a midfielder, started out his career at Standard FC de Montataire, joining Lille, where he would feature for the B team, later on. In 1989, he moved to Division 2 Louhans-Cuiseaux. In four seasons at the club, he made a total of 109 league appearances, and scored 14 goals. He would then sign for Beauvais, a club also in the Division 2; there, he made 23 appearances in one season under the coaching of Vahid Halilhodžić.

After 1994, Vandeputte pursued his career in amateur divisions of French football. He went through Saint-Leu and Stade Montois before signing for Chantilly as player-manager in January 1998.

== International career ==
In the early parts of his career, Vandeputte was minimally selected with France youth teams.

== Managerial career ==
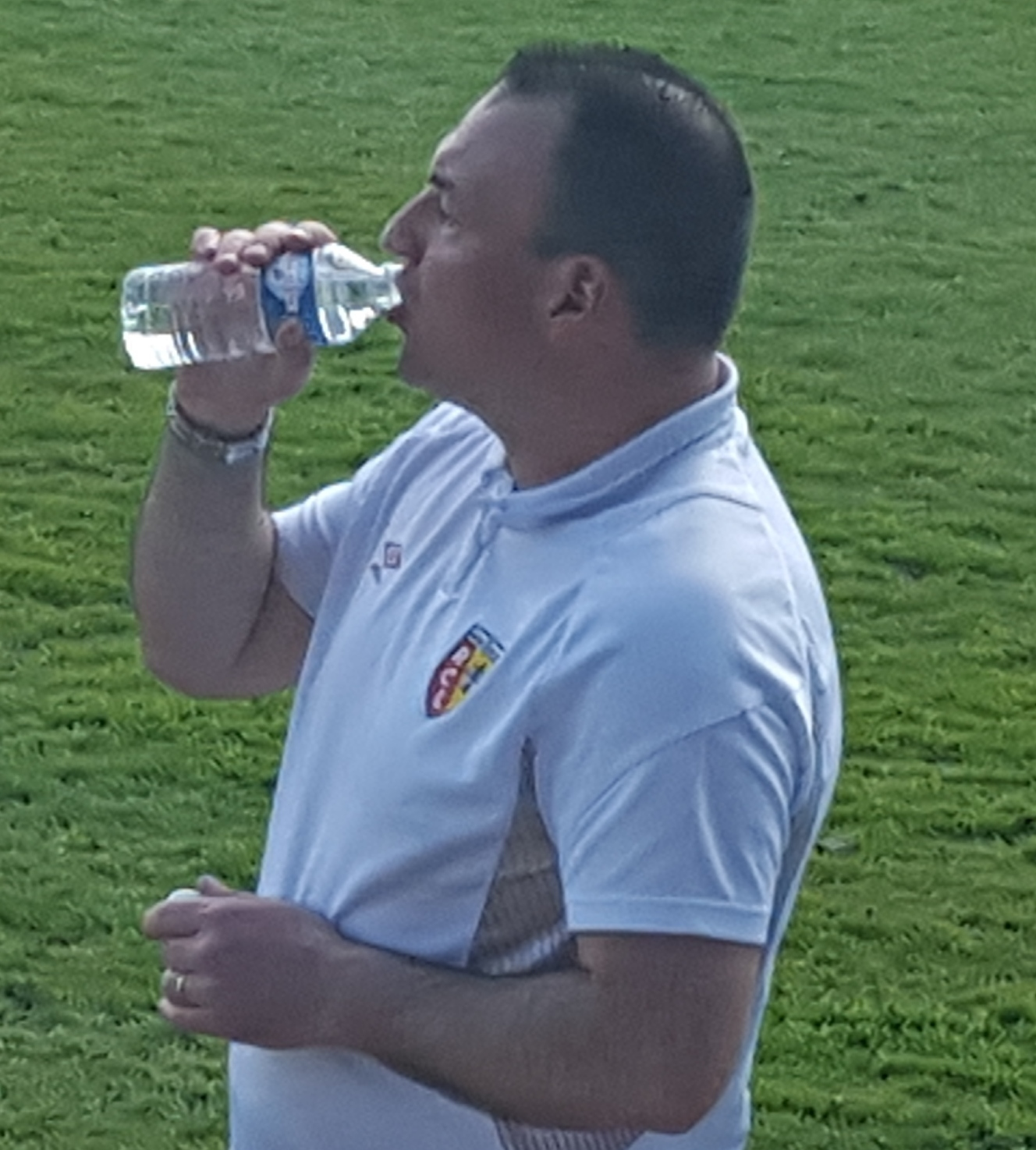
Vandeputte drinking water while coaching Lens U19 in 2016

Vandeputte was first player-manager at Chantilly for three and a half seasons before becoming U19 coach at Louhans-Cuiseaux from 2003 to 2004. He subsequently managed Dijon's B team, helping them win their group of the Championnat de France Amateur 2 in the 2004–05 season. In 2008, he joined Sochaux's B team as a member of the staff. Four years later, in 2012, he was appointed manager of the team, a role he stayed at until 2015.

In 2015, Vandeputte began to coach Lens's U19 team. In his first season in charge, he led them to the Coupe Gambardella Final, but they suffered a 3–0 loss against Monaco, finishing as runners-up. In 2017, he headed to Bourg-en-Bresse's B team, where he would stay at for one season, moving to coach Caen's B team in 2018.

=== Caen ===
Vandeputte only stayed in the position of B team coach at Caen for four months, because in November 2018, he stepped up as assistant manager for the first team after being promoted by Fabien Mercadal. However, he eventually went back to his role of B team coach in July 2019. In November 2020, Vandeputte was appointed as head of youth development at the club.

On 23 March 2021, Vandeputte was appointed as head coach of Caen following the sacking of Pascal Dupraz. Cédric Hengbart, Vandeputte's assistant in the reserve side, joined him as assistant manager of the senior side. At the end of the season, Caen managed to stay in Ligue 2, finishing 17th. Vandeputte would return to coach the reserve side, and was succeeded by Stéphane Moulin.

== Personal life ==
Vandeputte was born in Mazingarbe, a town near Lens in the Pas-de-Calais department.

While in parallel playing with Lille, he completed his military service at Bataillon de Joinville, a military unit of the French Army composed of athletes. Here, he met footballers such as Zinedine Zidane, Pascal Nouma, Nicolas Ouédec, Xavier Gravelaine, and Guillaume Warmuz.

== Honours ==
=== Manager ===
Dijon B

- Championnat de France Amateur 2: 2004–05

Lens U19

- Coupe Gambardella runner-up: 2015–16

Caen B

- Championnat National 3: 2019–20
