= Jason Ngouabi =

French footballer (born 2003)

Personal information
- Full name: Jason Ngouabi Lougagui
- Date of birth: 16 January 2003 (age 23)
- Place of birth: Sarcelles, France
- Height: 1.97 m (6 ft 6 in)
- Position: Defender

Team information
- Current team: APEA Akrotiri
- Number: 26

Youth career
- 2013–2015: Les Mureaux
- 2015–2020: Caen

Senior career*
Years	Team	Apps	(Gls)
2020–2023	Caen II	21	(0)
2020–2023	Caen	2	(0)
2022	→ Sète (loan)	7	(0)
2023	Borgo	10	(0)
2023	Cholet	0	(0)
2025	Ayia Napa	12	(0)
2025–	APEA Akrotiri	25	(3)

International career
2019	France U16	8	(1)
2019–2020	France U17	4	(0)
- * Club domestic league appearances and goals as of 3 May 2026

Jason Ngouabi Lougagui (born 16 January 2003) is a French professional footballer who plays as a defender for Cypriot Second Division club APEA Akrotiri.

== Club career ==
On 12 June 2020, Ngouabi signed his first professional contract with Caen. Ngouabi made his professional debut with Caen in a 0–0 Ligue 2 tie with FC Chambly on 19 September 2020.

On 2 February 2022, Ngouabi was loaned to Sète.

== Personal life ==
Born in France, Ngouabi is of Republic of the Congo descent. He is a youth international for France.
