= 2014 Coupe de la Ligue final =

- Event: 2013–14 Coupe de la Ligue
Lyon	Paris Saint-Germain
Ligue 1	Ligue 1
1	2
- Date: 19 April 2014
- Venue: Stade de France, Saint-Denis
- Man of the Match: Edinson Cavani (Paris Saint-Germain)
- Referee: Stéphane Lannoy
- Attendance: 78,489

The 2014 Coupe de la Ligue final was the 20th final of France's football league cup competition, the Coupe de la Ligue, a competition for the 42 teams that the Ligue de Football Professionnel (LFP) manages. The final took place on 19 April 2014 at the Stade de France in Saint-Denis and was contested between Lyon and Paris Saint-Germain. PSG won 2–1 and became the first club to win the competition four times, ahead of Bordeaux and Marseille.

The winner of the final should have been guaranteed a UEFA Europa League place for the 2014–15 season, but PSG had already qualified for the 2014–15 UEFA Champions League via its league position.

== Build-up ==
=== Team backgrounds ===
Lyon appeared in its fifth final of the Coupe de la Ligue. The Rhône-Alpes-based club won its only league cup title in 2001 defeating Monaco 2–1 after extra time. In Lyon's three other finals appearances, the club finished runner-up in 1996, 2007 and 2012 to Metz, Bordeaux and Marseille respectively.

In their four previous finals, Paris Saint-Germain had won three: the inaugural final in 1995 against Bastia, in 1998 against Bordeaux in a penalty shootout, and a 2-1 win over Lens in 2008. Their one defeat in a final had been in 2000, losing to second-tier Gueugnon. PSG manager Laurent Blanc had won the 2009 final with Bordeaux.

The two teams met in the league six days before the final, Lyon winning 1–0 at home through Jordan Ferri to inflict only PSG's second league defeat of the season and prevent them from possibly winning the title on that day. However, Lyon manager Rémi Garde, said "The two matches shouldn't be compared. We were at home and on Saturday we're away from home. We're closer to Paris than Lyon. They are two competitions with different ingredients. I'm not worried that we'll relax after our win. We'll start from scratch."

PSG were disadvantaged by the loss through injury of Ligue 1 top scorer Zlatan Ibrahimović, who was injured in their Champions League victory over Chelsea on 2 April. As a result, Edinson Cavani moved to centre-forward. First-choice goalkeeper Salvatore Sirigu was rested for PSG, with Nicolas Douchez starting instead. A BBC preview to the match said, "Champions League heartbreak, losing your best player through injury and then being beaten by tonight's opponents in your last game. It's fair enough to say Paris St-Germain's build-up to the French League Cup final hasn't been ideal."

=== Ticketing ===
The Coupe de la Ligue final has been played every year at the Stade de France since 1998, following the stadium's completion. The stadium has a capacity of 81,338 spectators. Both clubs will receive the same quota of tickets, which are distributed to season ticket holders and through each club's ticket sales at a later date. Ticketing information was released on 12 February 2014.

== Route to the final ==
Note: In all results below, the score of the finalist is given first (H: home; A: away).

Lyon		Round	Paris Saint-Germain	
Opponent	Result	2013–14 Coupe de la Ligue	Opponent	Result
Reims (H)	3–2	Round of 16	Saint-Étienne (H)	2–1 (a.e.t.)
Marseille (H)	2–1	Quarter-finals	Bordeaux (A)	3–1
Troyes (H)	2–1	Semi-finals	Nantes (A)	2–1

=== Lyon ===
As a Ligue 1 club involved in a European campaign, Lyon entered in the Round of 16 on 18 December 2013 and defeated Reims 3–2 at home, with all goals in the second half, Lyon's through Bafétimbi Gomis, Alexandre Lacazette and Yoann Gourcuff. In the quarter-finals on 15 January 2014, again at home, they beat Marseille 2–1 through Gourcuff and Gomis. Lyon's semi-final was at home against Ligue 2 club Troyes on 5 February, and they won 2–1 after Lacazette and Gomis scored in the first half hour of play.

=== Paris Saint-Germain ===
Due to the same circumstances, PSG also entered the tournament at the same stage on the same day, and played holders Saint-Étienne at home in their first match. Edinson Cavani put the home team ahead in the first half, before Mevlüt Erdinç equalised late on. Cavani then scored the winner within the last five minutes of extra time. In the quarter-finals on 14 January, PSG travelled to the Stade Chaban-Delmas to play against Bordeaux. Javier Pastore scored the first goal at the end of the first half, with André Biyogo Poko equalising soon after play resumed. With two goals in the last five minutes of the match, Adrien Rabiot and Blaise Matuidi put PSG into the semi-finals. At the Stade de la Beaujoire, PSG gained the lead early on through Zlatan Ibrahimović, and the last ten minutes saw Olivier Veigneau equalise and Ibrahimović score the winner.

== Match ==
=== Summary ===
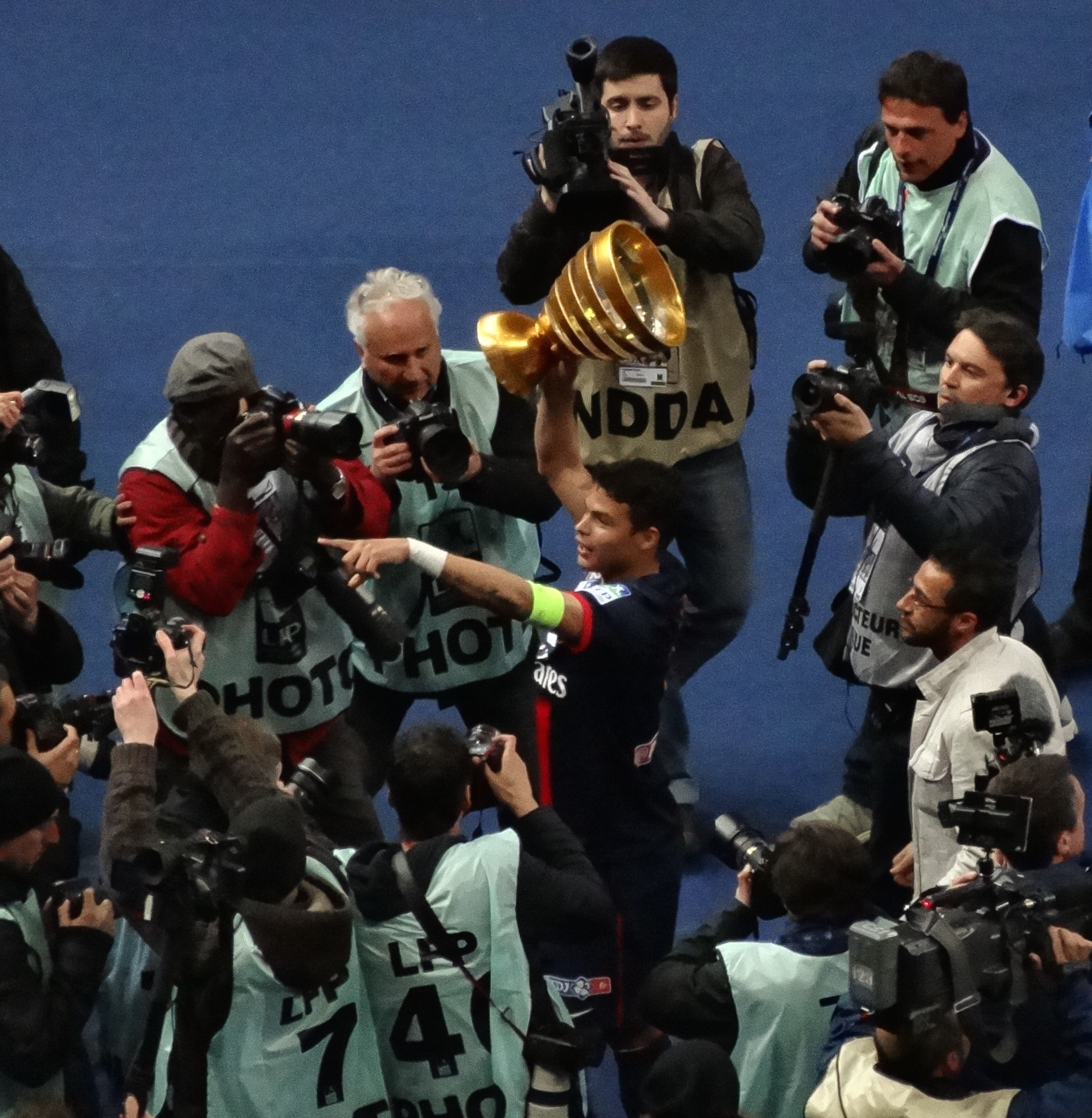
PSG captain Thiago Silva with the trophy

After 178 seconds of play, Edinson Cavani opened the scoring for PSG by tapping in a cross from left-back Maxwell which beat Lyon goalkeeper Anthony Lopes. Cavani gained advantage by playing in a preferred centre-forward position due to the injury to Zlatan Ibrahimović, and soon after scoring forced a save by a volley. PSG defender Alex had a goal ruled out for offside, and Cavani converted a penalty won when Lopes fouled Lucas. A chance for a first-half hat-trick was denied when Cavani missed a one-on-one from eight yards out, and in the first ten minutes of the second half, Alexandre Lacazette scored for Lyon by running from the halfway line and then shooting from 20 yards. Despite then dominating possession, Lyon had few subsequent chances to equalise.

=== Details ===
19 April 2014
21:00 CEST

Lyon	1–2	Paris Saint-Germain
Lacazette 56'	Report; Report	Cavani 4', 33' (pen.)

Stade de France, Saint-Denis
Attendance: 78,489
Referee: Stéphane Lannoy

Lyon	Paris Saint-Germain

GK	16	(Portugal) Anthony Lopes	(yellow card) 32'
RB	14	(France) Mouhamadou Dabo		(substituted off) 54'
CB	5	(Serbia) Milan Biševac	(yellow card) 72'
CB	23	(France) Samuel Umtiti
LB	3	(Cameroon) Henri Bedimo		(substituted off) 90+2'
DM	21	(France) Maxime Gonalons (c)
CM	24	(France) Corentin Tolisso
CM	28	(Democratic Republic of the Congo) Arnold Mvuemba
AM	17	(France) Steed Malbranque		(substituted off) 68'
CF	18	(France) Bafétimbi Gomis
CF	10	(France) Alexandre Lacazette
Substitutes:
GK	30	(France) Mathieu Gorgelin
DF	2	(Algeria) Mehdi Zeffane
DF	4	(Burkina Faso) Bakary Koné		(substituted on) 90+2'
MF	20	(France) Gaël Danic
FW	19	(France) Jimmy Briand		(substituted on) 54'
FW	26	(Cameroon) Clinton N'Jie
FW	31	(France) Nabil Fekir		(substituted on) 68'
Manager:
(France) Rémi Garde

GK	1	(France) Nicolas Douchez
RB	26	(France) Christophe Jallet
CB	13	(Brazil) Alex
CB	2	(Brazil) Thiago Silva (c)
LB	17	(Brazil) Maxwell
DM	8	(Italy) Thiago Motta
CM	24	(Italy) Marco Verratti	(yellow card) 18'	(substituted off) 74'
CM	14	(France) Blaise Matuidi
RW	29	(Brazil) Lucas		(substituted off) 90+1'
CF	9	(Uruguay) Edinson Cavani
LW	22	(Argentina) Ezequiel Lavezzi		(substituted off) 75'
Substitutes:
GK	30	(Italy) Salvatore Sirigu
DF	5	(Brazil) Marquinhos
DF	21	(France) Lucas Digne
MF	4	(France) Yohan Cabaye		(substituted on) 74'
MF	7	(France) Jérémy Ménez		(substituted on) 90+1'
MF	25	(France) Adrien Rabiot
MF	27	(Argentina) Javier Pastore		(substituted on) 75'
Manager:
(France) Laurent Blanc

Man of the Match:
Edinson Cavani (Paris Saint-Germain)

Assistant referees:
Mickaël Annonier
Frédéric Cano
Fourth official:
Eric Dansault
Additional assistant referees:
Nicolas Rainville
Bartolomeu Varela

Match rules

- 90 minutes.
- 30 minutes of extra time if necessary.
- Penalty shoot-out if scores still level.
- Seven named substitutes, of which up to three may be used.

== See also ==
- 2014 Coupe de France final
- 2013–14 Olympique Lyonnais season
- 2013–14 Paris Saint-Germain FC season
