= 2013–14 Olympique Lyonnais season =

Lyon
2013–14 season
- Owner: OL Groupe
- Chairman: Jean-Michel Aulas
- Manager: Rémi Garde
- Stadium: Stade de Gerland
- Ligue 1: 5th
- Coupe de France: Round of 16 (vs. Lens)
- Coupe de la Ligue: Runners-up (vs. PSG)
- UEFA Champions League: Play-off round (vs. Real Sociedad)
- UEFA Europa League: Quarter-final (vs. Juventus)
- Top goalscorer: League: Alexandre Lacazette (15 goals); All: Bafétimbi Gomis; Alexandre Lacazette (22 each)
Home colours	Away colours	Third colours

The 2013–14 season was Olympique Lyonnais's 64th professional season since its creation in 1950. The club competed in Ligue 1, finishing fifth, the Coupe de France, the Coupe de la Ligue, the UEFA Champions League, and the UEFA Europa League.

== Squad ==
=== First-team squad ===
As of 2 September 2013.

Note: Flags indicate national team as defined under FIFA eligibility rules; some limited exceptions apply. Players may hold more than one non-FIFA nationality.

No.	Pos.	Nation	Player
1	GK	FRA	Rémy Vercoutre
2	DF	FRA	Mehdi Zeffane
3	DF	CMR	Henri Bedimo
4	DF	BFA	Bakary Koné
5	DF	SRB	Milan Biševac
6	MF	FRA	Gueïda Fofana
7	MF	FRA	Clément Grenier
8	MF	FRA	Yoann Gourcuff
10	FW	FRA	Alexandre Lacazette
11	MF	FRA	Rachid Ghezzal
12	MF	FRA	Jordan Ferri
13	DF	POR	Miguel Lopes (on loan from Sporting CP)
14	DF	FRA	Mouhamadou Dabo
15	DF	FRA	Mouhamadou-Naby Sarr

No.	Pos.	Nation	Player
16	GK	POR	Anthony Lopes
17	MF	FRA	Steed Malbranque
18	FW	FRA	Bafétimbi Gomis
19	FW	FRA	Jimmy Briand
20	MF	FRA	Gaël Danic
21	MF	FRA	Maxime Gonalons (Captain)
23	DF	FRA	Samuel Umtiti
24	MF	FRA	Corentin Tolisso
25	FW	ALG	Yassine Benzia
28	MF	COD	Arnold Mvuemba
29	MF	FRA	Fares Bahlouli
30	GK	FRA	Mathieu Gorgelin
31	MF	FRA	Nabil Fekir

=== Out on loan ===
Note: Flags indicate national team as defined under FIFA eligibility rules; some limited exceptions apply. Players may hold more than one non-FIFA nationality.

No.	Pos.	Nation	Player
—	FW	FRA	Alassane Pléa (on loan to AJ Auxerre)
—	FW	GUI	Mohamed Yattara (on loan to Angers SCO)

=== Reserve squad ===
Note: Flags indicate national team as defined under FIFA eligibility rules; some limited exceptions apply. Players may hold more than one non-FIFA nationality.

No.	Pos.	Nation	Player
22	MF	MLI	Sidy Koné
24	MF	FRA	Corentin Tolisso
26	FW	CMR	Clinton N'Jie
29	MF	FRA	Fares Bahlouli
31	MF	FRA	Nabil Fekir
32	MF	FRA	Zakarie Labidi
35	DF	NOR	Ulrik Jenssen
37	MF	ALG	Nassim Zitouni
38	FW	FRA	Mour Paye
39	FW	LBN	Philippe Paoli
40	GK	BEL	Théo Defourny
41	MF	FRA	Grégoire Viricel
43	MF	FRA	Aldo Kalulu

No.	Pos.	Nation	Player
44	DF	FRA	Romaric N'Gouma
45	GK	SUI	Jérémy Frick
46	MF	FRA	Adrien Cabon
47	MF	SUI	Kévin Tsimba
49	DF	FRA	Pierre Ertel
50	GK	FRA	Lucas Mocio
51	DF	FRA	Arnaud Bloch
53	DF	FRA	Louis Nganioni
54	DF	FRA	Dylan Mboumbouni
56	MF	FRA	Jeremy de Sousa
59	GK	FRA	Dorian Grange
--	DF	FRA	Djessine Seba

== Competitions ==
=== Season overview ===
Competition	Starting round	Final position	Matches played	Wins	Draws	Losses	Goals for	Goals against	Goal difference
Ligue 1	Matchday 1	5th	38	17	10	11	56	44	+12
Coupe de France	Round of 64	Round of 16	3	2	0	1	10	4	+6
Coupe de la Ligue	Round of 16	Final	4	3	0	1	8	6	+2
Champions League	Third-qualifying round	Play-off round	4	2	0	2	2	4	-2
Europa League	Group stage	Quarter-finals	12	5	4	3	13	9	+4
Total	–	–	61	29	14	18	89	67	+22

=== Ligue 1 ===
==== League table ====
Pos	Team	Pld	W	D	L	GF	GA	GD	Pts	Qualification or relegation
3	Lille	38	20	11	7	46	26	+20	71	Qualification for the Champions League third qualifying round
4	Saint-Étienne	38	20	9	9	56	34	+22	69	Qualification for the Europa League play-off round
5	Lyon	38	17	10	11	56	44	+12	61	Qualification for the Europa League third qualifying round
6	Marseille	38	16	12	10	53	40	+13	60	
7	Bordeaux	38	13	14	11	49	43	+6	53	

Source: Ligue 1
Rules for classification: 1) Points; 2) Goal difference; 3) Number of goals scored

==== Results summary ====
Overall								Home						Away					
Pld	W	D	L	GF	GA	GD	Pts	W	D	L	GF	GA	GD	W	D	L	GF	GA	GD
38	17	10	11	56	44	+12	61	8	7	4	30	15	+15	9	3	7	26	29	−3

Source: Soccerway

==== Results by round ====
Round	1	2	3	4	5	6	7	8	9	10	11	12	13	14	15	16	17	18	19	20	21	22	23	24	25	26	27	28	29	30	31	32	33	34	35	36	37	38
Ground	H	A	H	A	H	H	A	H	A	H	A	H	A	H	A	H	A	H	A	H	A	H	A	A	H	A	H	A	H	A	H	A	H	A	H	A	H	A
Result	W	W	L	L	D	W	D	D	L	D	L	W	W	D	L	D	W	D	D	W	W	W	L	W	W	D	D	W	L	W	L	W	W	D	W	L	L	W
Position	1	1	3	9	9	8	9	9	14	12	14	13	8	8	10	12	11	11	11	9	7	6	7	6	6	6	6	5	5	5	5	5	5	5	5	5	5	5

Source: Ligue 1
A = Away; H = Home; W = Win; D = Draw; L = Loss

==== Matches ====
Win Draw Loss

10 August 2013 1	Lyon	4–0	Nice	Lyon
21:00 CEST	Lacazette 13', 69'; Grenier 54'; Gourcuff 90+2'	Report		Stadium: Stade de Gerland; Attendance: 23,552; Referee: Fredy Fautrel

16 August 2013 2	Sochaux	1–3	Lyon	Montbéliard
20:30 CEST	Boudebouz 4' (pen.)	Report	Benzia 35'; Lacazette 43'; Gourcuff 48'	Stadium: Stade Auguste Bonal; Attendance: 13,857; Referee: Saïd Ennjimi

24 August 2013 3	Lyon	0–1	Reims	Lyon
21:00 CEST		Report	Fortes 76'	Stadium: Stade de Gerland; Attendance: 24,238; Referee: Ruddy Buquet

31 August 2013 4	Evian	2–1	Lyon	Annecy
14:00 CEST	Bérigaud 8', 34'	Report	Ferri 49'	Stadium: Parc des Sports; Attendance: 12,699; Referee: Clément Turpin

15 September 2013 5	Lyon	0–0	Rennes	Lyon
21:00 CEST		Report		Stadium: Stade de Gerland; Attendance: 33,352; Referee: Laurent Duhamel

22 September 2013 6	Lyon	3–1	Nantes	Lyon
17:00 CEST	Gomis 26'; Grenier 55'; Briand 72'	Report	Veretout 24'	Stadium: Stade de Gerland; Attendance: 33,861; Referee: Amaury Delerue

25 September 2013 7	Ajaccio	2–1	Lyon	Ajaccio
19:00 CEST	Arrache 18'; Camara 70'	Report	Malbranque 56'; Lacazette (yellow card) 90' (red card) 90'	Stadium: Stade François Coty; Attendance: 6,184; Referee: Antony Gautier

28 September 2013 8	Lyon	0–0	Lille	Lyon
21:00 CEST		Report		Stadium: Stade de Gerland; Attendance: 39,717; Referee: Bartolomeu Varela

6 October 2013 9	Montpellier	5–1	Lyon	Montpellier
14:00 CEST	Montaño 16', 68'; Mounier 45'; Cabella 59' (pen.), 66'	Report	Gonalons (yellow card) 42' (yellow-red card) 83'; Lacazette 47'	Stadium: Stade de la Mosson; Attendance: 14,730; Referee: Stéphane Lannoy

20 October 2013 10	Lyon	1–1	Bordeaux	Lyon
21:00 CEST	Lacazette (yellow card) 41' (yellow-red card) 67'; Briand 90+2'	Report	Obraniak 62'	Stadium: Stade de Gerland; Attendance: 36,774; Referee: Nicolas Rainville

27 October 2013 11	Monaco	2–1	Lyon	Monaco
17:00 CEST	Obbadi 28'; Falcao 36'	Report	Gomis 62'	Stadium: Stade Louis II; Attendance: 11,352; Referee: Laurent Duhamel

2 November 2013 12	Lyon	2–0	Guingamp	Lyon
20:00 CET	Lacazette 12'; Gomis 13'	Report	Diallo (red card) 53'	Stadium: Stade de Gerland; Attendance: 37,334; Referee: Olivier Thual

10 November 2013 13	Saint-Étienne	1–2	Lyon	Saint-Étienne
21:00 CET	Hamouma 65'	Report	Lacazette 48'; Briand 90+3'	Stadium: Stade Geoffroy-Guichard; Attendance: 37,587; Referee: Stéphane Lannoy

23 November 2013 14	Lyon	1–1	Valenciennes	Lyon
20:00 CET	Gomis 16'	Report	Bahebeck 66'	Stadium: Stade de Gerland; Attendance: 33,202; Referee: Amaury Delerue

1 December 2013 15	Paris Saint-Germain	4–0	Lyon	Paris
21:00 CET	Cavani 36'; Ibrahimović 41' (pen.), 83' (pen.); Thiago Silva 60'	Report		Stadium: Parc des Princes; Attendance: 44,829; Referee: Antony Gautier

5 December 2013 16	Lyon	1–1	Toulouse	Lyon
21:00 CET	Lacazette 25'	Report	Braithwaite 83'	Stadium: Stade de Gerland; Attendance: 29,152; Referee: Benoît Millot

8 December 2013 17	Bastia	1–3	Lyon	Furiani
17:00 CET	Cahuzac (yellow card) 69' (yellow-red card) 88'; Raspentino 34'	Report	Lacazette 53'; Benzia 56'; Gomis 85'	Stadium: Stade Armand Cesari; Attendance: 13,722; Referee: Bartolomeu Varela

15 December 2013 18	Lyon	2–2	Marseille	Lyon
21:00 CET	Lacazette 17'; Gomis 44'	Report	Gignac 45+1'; Thauvin 79'	Stadium: Stade de Gerland; Attendance: 34,218; Referee: Ruddy Buquet

22 December 2013 19	Lorient	2–2	Lyon	Lorient
17:00 CET	Aboubakar 60'; Traoré 90+3'	Report	Grenier 21'; Gomis 49'	Stadium: Stade du Moustoir; Attendance: 16,111; Referee: Benoît Bastien

11 January 2014 20	Lyon	2–0	Sochaux	Lyon
20:00 CET	Grenier 57'; Gourcuff 75'	Report		Stadium: Stade de Gerland; Attendance: 36,099; Referee: Stéphane Lannoy

19 January 2014 21	Reims	0–2	Lyon	Reims
14:00 CET		Report	Lacazette 25'; Fofana 84'	Stadium: Stade Auguste Delaune; Attendance: 17,262; Referee: Olivier Thual

26 January 2014 22	Lyon	3–0	Evian	Lyon
14:00 CET	Gomis 19'; Lacazette 43', 76'	Report	Mensah (yellow card) 40' (yellow-red card) 40'	Stadium: Stade de Gerland; Attendance: 34,929; Referee: Tony Chapron

2 February 2014 23	Rennes	2–0	Lyon	Rennes
17:00 CET	Hountondji 22'; Toivonen 66'	Report	Umtiti (red card) 42'	Stadium: Stade de la Route de Lorient; Attendance: 20,546; Referee: Philippe Kalt

9 February 2014 24	Nantes	1–2	Lyon	Nantes
14:00 CET	Đorđević 84', (yellow card) 86' (red card) 87'	Report	Lacazette 40'; Gomis 76'	Stadium: Stade de la Beaujoire; Attendance: 35,450; Referee: Nicolas Rainville

16 February 2014 25	Lyon	3–1	Ajaccio	Lyon
14:00 CET	Fofana 43'; Briand 68'; Gomis 90'	Report	Oliech 81'	Stadium: Stade de Gerland; Attendance: 35,103; Referee: Bartolomeu Varela

23 February 2014 26	Lille	0–0	Lyon	Villeneuve-d'Ascq
21:00 CET		Report		Stadium: Stade Pierre-Mauroy; Attendance: 43,518; Referee: Benoît Millot

2 March 2014 27	Lyon	0–0	Montpellier	Lyon
17:00 CET		Report		Stadium: Stade de Gerland; Attendance: 35,865; Referee: Lionel Jaffredo

9 March 2014 28	Bordeaux	1–2	Lyon	Bordeaux
21:00 CET	Saivet 7'	Report	Bedimo 90+1'; Tolisso 90+4'	Stadium: Stade Chaban-Delmas; Attendance: 17,660; Referee: Antony Gautier

16 March 2014 29	Lyon	2–3	Monaco	Lyon
17:00 CET	Briand 32', 78'	Report	Germain 4'; Rodríguez 27'; Berbatov 51'	Stadium: Stade de Gerland; Attendance: 35,062; Referee: Fredy Fautrel

23 March 2014 30	Guingamp	0–1	Lyon	Guingamp
17:00 CET		Report	Gomis 46'	Stadium: Stade du Roudourou; Attendance: 15,167; Referee: Laurent Duhamel

30 March 2014 31	Lyon	1–2	Saint-Étienne	Lyon
21:00 CET	Lacazette 39'	Report	Erdinç 28'; Gradel 74'	Stadium: Stade de Gerland; Attendance: 36,822; Referee: Ruddy Buquet

6 April 2014 32	Valenciennes	1–2	Lyon	Valenciennes
17:00 CEST	Waris 66' da Silva (yellow card) 74' (red card) 84'	Report	Gomis 30'; Ferri 69'; Vercoutre (yellow card) 81' (yellow-red card) 82'	Stadium: Stade du Hainaut; Attendance: 13,922; Referee: Nicolas Rainville

13 April 2014 33	Lyon	1–0	Paris Saint-Germain	Lyon
21:00 CEST	Ferri 31'	Report		Stadium: Stade de Gerland; Attendance: 38,096; Referee: Clément Turpin

23 April 2014 34	Toulouse	0–0	Lyon	Toulouse
18:30 CEST		Report		Stadium: Stadium Municipal; Attendance: 12,104; Referee: Amaury Delerue

27 April 2014 35	Lyon	4–1	Bastia	Lyon
17:00 CEST	Gomis 14'; Fekir 23'; B. Koné 50'; Lacazette 64'	Report	Bruno 47'	Stadium: Stade de Gerland; Attendance: 36,958; Referee: Benoît Millot

4 May 2014 36	Marseille	4–2	Lyon	Marseille
21:00 CEST	Diawara 12'; Thauvin 26'; Gignac 48', 56'	Report	Mvuemba 40'; Gomis 82'	Stadium: Stade Vélodrome; Attendance: 37,842; Referee: Lionel Jaffredo

10 May 2014 37	Lyon	0–1	Lorient	Lyon
21:00 CEST	Dabo (red card) 14'; Ferri (red card) 90'	Report	Doukouré 53'; Monnet-Paquet (red card) 90'	Stadium: Stade de Gerland; Attendance: 39,533; Referee: Antony Gautier

17 May 2014 38	Nice	0–1	Lyon	Nice
21:00 CEST		Report	B. Koné 6'	Stadium: Allianz Riviera; Attendance: 28,405; Referee: Saïd Ennjimi

=== Coupe de France ===
5 January 2014 Round of 64	La Suze-sur-Sarthe	1–6	Lyon	Le Mans
14:15 CET	Pichot 41' (pen.)		Gomis 6', 56'; Grenier 43'; Lacazette 58', 79'; Malbranque 66'	Stadium: MMArena; Attendance: 20,000; Referee: Stéphane Jochem

22 January 2014 Round of 32	Yzeure	1–3	Lyon	Clermont-Ferrand
19:00 CET	E. M'Baye 75'		Briand 76'; Gourcuff 81'; Malbranque 84'	Stadium: Stade Gabriel Montpied; Attendance: 9,000; Referee: Benoît Millot

13 February 2014 Round of 16	Lyon	1–2 (a.e.t.)	Lens	Lyon
20:45 CET	Briand 9'		Valdivia 90+2' (pen.); Gbamin 94'	Stadium: Stade de Gerland; Attendance: 14,703; Referee: Clément Turpin

=== Coupe de la Ligue ===
18 December 2013 Round of 16	Lyon	3–2	Reims	Lyon
17:00 CET	Gomis 58'; Lacazette 60'; Gourcuff 82'	Report	Oniangue 64'; Ayité 87' (pen.)	Stadium: Stade de Gerland; Attendance: 21,654; Referee: Saïd Ennjimi

15 January 2014 Quarter-final	Lyon	2–1	Marseille	Lyon
20:55 CET	Gourcuff 24'; Gomis 74'	Report	Gignac 89' (pen.)	Stadium: Stade de Gerland; Attendance: 27,338; Referee: Antony Gautier

5 February 2014 Semi-final	Lyon	2–1	Troyes	Lyon
20:55 CET	Lacazette 16'; Gomis 27'	Report	Xavier 35'	Stadium: Stade de Gerland; Attendance: 19,168; Referee: Lionel Jaffredo

19 April 2014 Final	Lyon	1–2	Paris Saint-Germain	Saint-Denis
21:00 CET	Lacazette 56'	Report	Cavani 4', 33' (pen.)	Stadium: Stade de France; Attendance: 78,489; Referee: Stéphane Lannoy

=== UEFA Champions League ===
==== Third qualifying round ====
30 July 2013 First leg	Lyon (France)	1–0	(Switzerland) Grasshopper Club	Lyon, France
21:00 CEST	Biševac 64'	Report		Stadium: Stade de Gerland; Attendance: 27,331; Referee: Hüseyin Göçek (Turkey)

6 August 2013 Second leg	Grasshopper Club (Switzerland)	0–1 (0–2 agg.)	(France) Lyon	Zürich, Switzerland
21:00 CEST		Report	Grenier 82'	Stadium: Letzigrund; Attendance: 9,500; Referee: Antonio Mateu Lahoz (Spain)

==== Play-off round ====
20 August 2013 First leg	Lyon (France)	0–2	(Spain) Real Sociedad	Lyon, France
20:45 CEST	Biševac (yellow card) 37' (yellow-red card) 75'	Report	Griezmann 17'; Seferovic 50'	Stadium: Stade de Gerland; Attendance: 38,156; Referee: Milorad Mažić (Serbia)

28 August 2013 Second leg	Real Sociedad (Spain)	2–0 (4–0 agg.)	(France) Lyon	San Sebastián, Spain
20:45 CEST	Vela 67', 90+1'	Report		Stadium: Anoeta; Attendance: 28,955; Referee: Damir Skomina (Slovenia)

=== UEFA Europa League ===
==== Group stage ====
Pos	Team	Pld	W	D	L	GF	GA	GD	Pts	Qualification
1	(France) Lyon	6	3	3	0	6	3	+3	12	Advance to knockout phase
2	(Spain) Real Betis	6	2	3	1	3	2	+1	9	Advance to knockout phase
3	(Portugal) Vitória de Guimarães	6	1	2	3	6	5	+1	5	
4	(Croatia) Rijeka	6	0	4	2	2	7	−5	4	

Source: Soccerway

19 September 2013 1	Real Betis (Spain)	0–0	(France) Lyon	Seville, Spain
21:05 CEST		Report		Stadium: Benito Villamarín; Attendance: 22,404; Referee: Stefan Johannesson (Sweden)

3 October 2013 2	Lyon (France)	1–1	(Portugal) Vitória de Guimarães	Lyon, France
19:00 CEST	Gonalons 53'	Report	Maâzou 39', (yellow card) 35' (yellow-red card) 90+5'	Stadium: Stade de Gerland; Attendance: 30,061; Referee: Florian Meyer (Germany)

24 October 2013 3	Lyon (France)	1–0	(Croatia) Rijeka	Lyon, France
19:00 CEST	Grenier 65'	Report		Stadium: Stade de Gerland; Attendance: 30,461; Referee: Artur Soares Dias (Portugal)

7 November 2013 4	Rijeka (Croatia)	1–1	(France) Lyon	Rijeka, Croatia
21:05 CET	Kramarić 21'	Report	Pléa 14'	Stadium: Stadion Kantrida; Attendance: 7,300; Referee: Alon Yefet (Israel)

28 November 2013 5	Lyon (France)	1–0	(Spain) Real Betis	Lyon, France
19:00 CET	Gomis 66'	Report		Stadium: Stade de Gerland; Attendance: 24,112; Referee: Andre Marriner (England)

12 December 2013 6	Vitória de Guimarães (Portugal)	1–2	(France) Lyon	Guimarães, Portugal
21:05 CET	Tómané 11'; Correia (yellow card) 57' (yellow-red card) 62'	Report	Gomis 62' (pen.); Ferri 65'	Stadium: Estádio D. Afonso Henriques; Attendance: 5,845; Referee: Matej Jug (Slovenia)

==== Knockout phase ====
===== Round of 32 =====
20 February 2014 First leg	Chornomorets Odesa (Ukraine)	0–0	(France) Lyon	Odesa, Ukraine
19:00 CET		Report		Stadium: Chornomorets Stadium; Attendance: 28,456; Referee: Craig Thomson (Scotland)

27 February 2014 Second leg	Lyon (France)	1–0 (1–0 agg.)	(Ukraine) Chornomorets Odesa	Lyon, France
21:05 CET	Lacazette 80'	Report	Zubeyko (yellow card) 16' (yellow-red card) 76'	Stadium: Stade de Gerland; Attendance: 25,039; Referee: Aleksandar Stavrev (Macedonia)

===== Round of 16 =====
13 March 2014 First leg	Lyon (France)	4–1	(Czech Republic) Viktoria Plzeň	Lyon, France
21:05 CET	Fofana 12', 70'; Lacazette 53'; Mvuemba 61'	Report	Hořava 2'	Stadium: Stade de Gerland; Attendance: 28,248; Referee: Antonio Mateu Lahoz (Spain)

20 March 2014 Second leg	Viktoria Plzeň (Czech Republic)	2–1 (3–5 agg.)	(France) Lyon	Plzeň, Czech Republic
19:00 CET	Kolář 60'; Tecl 62'	Report	Gomis 45+2'	Stadium: Doosan Arena; Attendance: 10,352; Referee: Szymon Marciniak (Poland)

===== Quarter-finals =====
3 April 2014 First leg	Lyon (France)	0–1	(Italy) Juventus	Lyon, France
21:05 CEST		Report	Bonucci 85'	Stadium: Stade de Gerland; Attendance: 37,084; Referee: William Collum (Scotland)

10 April 2014 Second leg	Juventus (Italy)	2–1 (3–1 agg.)	(France) Lyon	Turin, Italy
21:05 CEST	Pirlo 4'; Umtiti 68' (o.g.)	Report	Briand 18'	Stadium: Juventus Stadium; Attendance: 40,710; Referee: Alberto Undiano Mallenco (Spain)

== Statistics ==
=== Goalscorers ===
Rank	No.	Pos	Nat	Name	Ligue 1	Coupe de France	Coupe de la Ligue	Champions League	Europa League	Total
1	10	FW	(France)	Alexandre Lacazette	15	2	3	0	2	22
1	18	FW	(France)	Bafétimbi Gomis	14	2	3	0	3	22
3	19	FW	(France)	Jimmy Briand	6	2	0	0	1	9
4	7	MF	(France)	Clément Grenier	4	1	0	1	1	7
5	27	MF	(France)	Yoann Gourcuff	3	1	2	0	0	6
6	6	MF	(France)	Gueïda Fofana	2	0	0	0	2	4
6	12	MF	(France)	Jordan Ferri	3	0	0	0	1	4
8	17	MF	(France)	Steed Malbranque	1	2	0	0	0	3
9	4	DF	(Burkina Faso)	Bakary Koné	2	0	0	0	0	2
9	25	FW	(Algeria)	Yassine Benzia	2	0	0	0	0	2
9	28	MF	(Democratic Republic of the Congo)	Arnold Mvuemba	1	0	0	0	1	2
12	3	DF	(Cameroon)	Henri Bedimo	1	0	0	0	0	1
12	5	DF	(Serbia)	Milan Biševac	0	0	0	1	0	1
12	21	MF	(France)	Maxime Gonalons	0	0	0	0	1	1
12	24	MF	(France)	Corentin Tolisso	1	0	0	0	0	1
12	27	FW	(France)	Alassane Pléa	0	0	0	0	1	1
12	31	MF	(France)	Nabil Fekir	1	0	0	0	0	1
Own goals					0	0	0	0	0	0
Totals					56	10	8	2	13	89

Last updated: 17 May 2014.
Source: Competitions

=== Clean sheets ===
Rank	No.	Pos.	Player	Ligue 1	Coupe de France	Coupe de la Liga	UEFA Champions League	UEFA Europa League	Total
1	16	GK	(Portugal) Anthony Lopes	13	0	0	2	3	18
2	1	GK	(France) Rémy Vercoutre	0	0	0	0	2	2
Total				13	0	0	2	5	20

Last updated: 17 May 2014.
Source: Competitions
