= 2014–15 Olympique Lyonnais season =

Lyon
2014–15 season
- Owner: OL Groupe
- Chairman: Jean-Michel Aulas
- Manager: Hubert Fournier
- Stadium: Stade de Gerland
- Ligue 1: 2nd
- Coupe de France: Round of 32
- Coupe de la Ligue: Round of 16
- UEFA Europa League: Play-off round
- Top goalscorer: League: Alexandre Lacazette (27); All: Alexandre Lacazette (31)
Home colours	Away colours	Third colours

The 2014–15 season was Olympique Lyonnais's 65th professional season since its creation in 1950. The club competed in Ligue 1, finishing second, the Coupe de France, and the Coupe de la Ligue.

== Players ==
=== First team squad ===
French teams are limited to four players without EU citizenship. Hence, the squad list includes only the principal nationality of each player; several non-European players on the squad have dual citizenship with an EU country. Also, players from the ACP countries—countries in Africa, the Caribbean, and the Pacific that are signatories to the Cotonou Agreement—are not counted against non-EU quotas due to the Kolpak ruling.

As of 3 February 2015

Note: Flags indicate national team as defined under FIFA eligibility rules; some limited exceptions apply. Players may hold more than one non-FIFA nationality.

No.	Pos.	Nation	Player
1	GK	POR	Anthony Lopes
2	DF	ALG	Mehdi Zeffane
3	DF	CMR	Henri Bedimo
4	DF	BFA	Bakary Koné
5	DF	SRB	Milan Biševac
6	MF	FRA	Gueïda Fofana
7	MF	FRA	Clément Grenier
8	MF	FRA	Yoann Gourcuff
10	FW	FRA	Alexandre Lacazette
11	MF	FRA	Rachid Ghezzal
12	MF	FRA	Jordan Ferri
13	DF	FRA	Christophe Jallet
14	DF	FRA	Mouhamadou Dabo

No.	Pos.	Nation	Player]
17	MF	FRA	Steed Malbranque
18	MF	FRA	Nabil Fekir
19	FW	GUI	Mohamed Yattara
20	FW	CMR	Clinton N'Jie
21	MF	FRA	Maxime Gonalons (Captain)
22	DF	FRA	Lindsay Rose
23	DF	FRA	Samuel Umtiti
24	MF	FRA	Corentin Tolisso
25	FW	FRA	Yassine Benzia
27	FW	FRA	Maxwel Cornet
28	MF	FRA	Arnold Mvuemba
29	MF	FRA	Farès Bahlouli
30	GK	FRA	Mathieu Gorgelin

=== In ===
Date	Pos.	Player	Age	Moving from	Fee	Notes
17 July 2014	DF	(France) Lindsay Rose	22	(France) Valenciennes	£1,320,000	
23 July 2014	DF	(France) Christophe Jallet	30	(France) Paris Saint-Germain	£1,320,000	
15 January 2015	FW	(France) Maxwel Cornet	18	(France) Metz	£352,000	

=== Out ===
Date	Pos.	Player	Age	Moving to	Fee	Notes
1 July 2014	GK	(France) Rémy Vercoutre	34	(France) Caen	Free Transfer	
1 July 2014	FW	(France) Bafétimbi Gomis	28	(England) Swansea City	Free Transfer	
26 July 2014	DF	(France) Mouhamadou-Naby Sarr	20	(Portugal) Sporting CP	£880,000	
22 August 2014	FW	(France) Jimmy Briand	29	(Germany) Hannover 96	Free Transfer	
28 August 2014	FW	(France) Alassane Pléa	21	(France) Nice	£440,000	
1 September 2014	GK	(France) Théo Defourny	22	(Belgium) R.E. Virton	Free Transfer	

Last updated: 19 January 2015.

== Pre-season and friendlies ==
21 May 2014 Friendly	Jeonbuk (South Korea)	2–0	(France) Lyon	Jeonju, South Korea
12:00 CEST (UTC+02:00)	Han Kyo-won 22'; Lee Jae-sung 45'	Report		Stadium: Jeonju World Cup Stadium

5 July 2014 Friendly	Debrecen (Hungary)	4–2	(France) Lyon	Debrecen, Hungary
21:00 CEST (UTC+02:00)	Sidibe 20', 69'; Kulcsár 40', 66'	Report	Yattara 46'; Bahlouli 75' (pen.)	Stadium: Nagyerdei Stadion

15 July 2014 Friendly	Copenhagen (Denmark)	0–2	(France) Lyon	Copenhagen, Denmark
20:30 CEST (UTC+02:00)		Report	Yattara 60', 83'	Stadium: Telia Parken

19 July 2014 Friendly	Lyon (France)	4–1	(Ukraine) Shakhtar Donetsk	Lyon
20:00 CEST (UTC+02:00)	Fekir 68'; Lacazette 44' (pen.); Benzia 56'; Danic 88'	Report	Dentinho 83'	Stadium: Stade de Gerland

23 July 2014 Friendly	Lyon (France)	0–0	(Spain) Sevilla	Lyon
20:00 CEST (UTC+02:00)		Report		Stadium: Stade de Gerland

== Competitions ==
=== Ligue 1 ===
==== League table ====
Pos	Team	Pld	W	D	L	GF	GA	GD	Pts	Qualification or relegation
1	Paris Saint-Germain (C)	38	24	11	3	83	36	+47	83	Qualification for the Champions League group stage
2	Lyon	38	22	9	7	72	33	+39	75	Qualification for the Champions League group stage
3	Monaco	38	20	11	7	51	26	+25	71	Qualification for the Champions League third qualifying round
4	Marseille	38	21	6	11	76	42	+34	69	Qualification for the Europa League group stage
5	Saint-Étienne	38	19	12	7	51	30	+21	69	Qualification for the Europa League third qualifying round (Note: Since winners of the 2014–15 Coupe de la Ligue, Paris Saint-Germain, qualified for European competition based on their league position, the spot awarded to the Coupe de la Ligue winner (Europa League third qualifying round) is passed to the next best team in the table not already qualified for any European competition (in this case, the fifth-placed team).)

Source: Ligue 1
Rules for classification: 1) points; 2) goal difference; 3) number of goals scored
(C) Champions

==== Results summary ====
Overall								Home						Away					
Pld	W	D	L	GF	GA	GD	Pts	W	D	L	GF	GA	GD	W	D	L	GF	GA	GD
38	22	9	7	72	33	+39	75	14	3	2	40	11	+29	8	6	5	32	22	+10

Last updated: 8 June 2015.
Source: Competitive matches

==== Results by round ====
Round	1	2	3	4	5	6	7	8	9	10	11	12	13	14	15	16	17	18	19	20	21	22	23	24	25	26	27	28	29	30	31	32	33	34	35	36	37	38
Ground	H	A	H	A	H	A	H	A	H	H	H	A	H	A	A	H	A	H	A	H	A	H	A	H	A	H	A	A	A	H	A	H	H	A	H	A	H	A
Result	W	L	L	L	W	D	W	D	W	W	W	W	W	D	L	W	W	W	W	W	W	W	D	D	D	W	L	W	D	L	W	W	D	W	W	L	D	W
Position	2	10	13	17	13	12	8	10	6	4	3	3	3	3	3	3	3	3	2	1	1	1	1	1	1	1	1	1	1	2	2	1	1	2	2	2	2	2

Source: Competitive matches
A = Away; H = Home; W = Win; D = Draw; L = Loss

==== Matches ====
Win Draw Loss

10 August 2014 1	Lyon	2–0	Rennes	Lyon
17:00 CEST (UTC+02:00)	Ferri (yellow card) 56'; Malbranque 64'; Lacazette 74' (pen.); Rose (yellow card) 75'	Report	Henrique (yellow card) 32'	Stadium: Stade de Gerland; Attendance: 27,811; Referee: Benoît Millot

16 August 2014 2	Toulouse	2–1	Lyon	Toulouse
20:00 CEST (UTC+02:00)	Akpa Akpro 10'; Veškovac (yellow card) 21'; Grigore (yellow card) 37'; Ben Yedder 45'; Moubandje (yellow card) 84'	Report	Mvuemba (yellow card) 44'; Lacazette 75'	Stadium: Stadium Municipal; Attendance: 13,275; Referee: Bartolomeu Varela

23 August 2014 3	Lyon	0–1	Lens	Lyon
14:00 CEST (UTC+02:00)	Gonalons (yellow card) 30'	Report	Nomenjanahary 11' (yellow card) 54'; Landre (yellow card) 43'; Cyprien (yellow card) 47'	Stadium: Stade de Gerland; Attendance: 24,636; Referee: Lionel Jaffredo

31 August 2014 4	Metz	2–1	Lyon	Metz
17:00 CEST (UTC+02:00)	N'Daw (yellow card) 46'; Ngbakoto 82'; Falcón 86'	Report	Lacazette 68'	Stadium: Stade Saint-Symphorien; Attendance: 20,173; Referee: Fredy Fautrel

12 September 2014 5	Lyon	2–1	Monaco	Lyon
20:30 CEST (UTC+02:00)	Jallet (yellow card) 14'; Fekir 30'; Tolisso 73'	Report	Oscampos 39'; Toulalan (yellow card) 56'	Stadium: Stade de Gerland; Attendance: 34,099; Referee: Benoît Bastien

19 September 2014 6	Paris Saint-Germain	1–1	Lyon	Paris
21:00 CEST (UTC+02:00)	Cavani 20'; Aurier (yellow card) 30'; Digne (yellow card) 62'; Motta (yellow card) 89'	Report	Ferri (yellow card) 80'; Umtiti 84'	Stadium: Parc des Princes; Attendance: 45,428; Referee: Ruddy Buquet

24 September 2014 7	Lyon	4–0	Lorient	Lyon
19:00 CEST (UTC+02:00)	Lacazette 5'; Fekir 39', 68'; N'Jie 50'	Report	Lautoa (yellow card) 62'	Stadium: Stade de Gerland; Attendance: 32,523; Referee: Sébastien Moreira

28 September 2014 8	Nantes	1–1	Lyon	Nantes
17:00 CEST (UTC+02:00)	Alhadhur (yellow card) 67'; Veretout 73' (pen.); Bammou (yellow card) 76'	Report	Fekir (yellow card) 37'; Koné 51'	Stadium: Stade de la Beaujoire; Attendance: 26,077; Referee: Nicolas Rainville

5 October 2014 9	Lyon	3–0	Lille	Lyon
17:00 CEST (UTC+02:00)	Gonalons (yellow card) 14'; Lacazette 39', 45', 84'	Report	Traoré (yellow card) 23'; Béria (yellow card) 27'; Baša (yellow card) 44'; Balmont (yellow card) 54'	Stadium: Stade de Gerland; Attendance: 34,349; Referee: Clément Turpin

19 October 2014 10	Lyon	5–1	Montpellier	Lyon
21:00 CEST (UTC+02:00)	Gonalons (yellow card) 21'; Gourcuff 36', 47'; Fekir 38', (yellow card) 60'; Umtiti (yellow card) 53'; Ferri (yellow card) 63'; Biševac (yellow card) 65'; Lacazette (yellow card) 71', (goal) 82'; Malbranque 88'	Report	Congré (yellow card) 27'; Martin (yellow card) 49'; Tiéné 54'; El Kaoutari (yellow card) 55'	Stadium: Stade de Gerland; Attendance: 35,688; Referee: Bartolomeu Varela

26 October 2014 11	Lyon	1–0	Marseille	Lyon
21:00 CET (UTC+01:00)	Biševac (yellow card) 48'; Gourcuff 65'	Report	Morel (yellow card) 8'; Romao (yellow card) 21'; A. Ayew (yellow card) 74'	Stadium: Stade de Gerland; Attendance: 38,712; Referee: Lionel Jaffredo

1 November 2014 12	Nice	1–3	Lyon	Nice
20:00 CET (UTC+01:00)	Mendy (yellow card) 29'; Palun (yellow card) 40'; Bauthéac (yellow card) 44'; Puel 51'	Report	Jallet (yellow card) 55'; Malbranque 64'; Fekir (yellow card) 78'; Lacazette 80', 90+4'	Stadium: Allianz Riviera; Attendance: 15,677; Referee: Amaury Delerue

9 November 2014 13	Lyon	3–1	Guingamp	Lyon
14:00 CET (UTC+01:00)	Lacazette 7'; Fekir 20', 87'; Malbranque (yellow card) 37'	Report	Lopes 45+1' (o.g.); Pied (yellow card) 49'	Stadium: Stade de Gerland; Attendance: 36,461; Referee: Benoît Millot

22 November 2014 14	Bastia	0–0	Lyon	Furiani
17:00 CET (UTC+01:00)	Kamano (yellow card) 32'; Diakité (yellow card) 47'; Squillaci (yellow card) 50'; Modesto (yellow card) 67'	Report	Biševac (yellow card) 48'	Stadium: Stade Armand Cesari; Attendance: 12,349; Referee: Benoît Bastien

30 November 2014 15	Saint-Étienne	3–0	Lyon	Saint-Étienne
21:00 CET (UTC+01:00)	Sall 18'; Van Wolfswinkel 40'; Cohade 68'; Diomandé (yellow card) 85'	Report		Stadium: Stade Geoffroy-Guichard; Attendance: 36,004; Referee: Clément Turpin

4 December 2014 16	Lyon	2–1	Reims	Lyon
21:00 CET (UTC+01:00)	Tolisso 6'; Koné (yellow card) 82'; Placide 90+1' (o.g.)	Report	Moukandjo 36'; Placide (yellow card) 81'	Stadium: Stade de Gerland; Attendance: 32,513; Referee: Saïd Ennjimi

7 December 2014 17	Evian	2–3	Lyon	Annecy
14:00 CET (UTC+01:00)	Koné (yellow card) 18'; Barbosa 28', 64'; Sorlin (yellow card) 61'	Report	Malbranque (yellow card) 28'; Dabo (yellow card) 34'; Biševac (yellow card) 41'; Benzia 62'; Lacazette 81', 90+4' (pen.)	Stadium: Parc des Sports; Attendance: 13,064; Referee: Tony Chapron

12 December 2014 18	Lyon	3–0	Caen	Lyon
20:30 CET (UTC+01:00)	Lacazette 7' (pen.), 57'; Ferri (yellow card) 47'; Benzia 62'	Report	Seube (yellow card) 45'; Yahia (yellow card) 53'	Stadium: Stade de Gerland; Attendance: 32,972; Referee: Bartolomeu Varela

21 December 2014 19	Bordeaux	0–5	Lyon	Bordeaux
21:00 CET (UTC+01:00)	Sertic (yellow card) 40'; Pallois (red card) 65'	Report	Jallet (yellow card) 34'; Lacazette 39', 90'; Tolisso 56'; Fekir 81'; Ferri 85'	Stadium: Stade Chaban-Delmas; Attendance: 31,873; Referee: Ruddy Buquet

11 January 2015 20	Lyon	3–0	Toulouse	Lyon
17:00 CET (UTC+01:00)	Lacazette 14', 27'; Dabo (yellow card) 39'; Fekir 48'	Report	Trejo (yellow card) 57'; Tisserand (yellow card) 61'; Aguilar (yellow card) 77'	Stadium: Stade de Gerland; Attendance: 35,928; Referee: Philippe Kalt

17 January 2015 21	Lens	0–2	Lyon	Lens
17:00 CET (UTC+01:00)		Report	Gbamin 22' (o.g.); Lacazette 26' (pen.)	Stadium: Stade de la Licorne; Attendance: 11,173; Referee: Amaury Delerue

25 January 2015 22	Lyon	2–0	Metz	Lyon
14:00 CET (UTC+01:00)	Lacazette 31' (pen.); Umtiti (yellow card) 45'; Dabo (yellow card) 53'; Tolisso 83'	Report	Milán (red card) 29'; Sarr (yellow card) 49'; Rivierez (yellow card) 51'	Stadium: Stade de Gerland; Attendance: 36,580; Referee: Olivier Thual

1 February 2015 23	Monaco	0–0	Lyon	Monaco
21:00 CET (UTC+01:00)	Dirar (yellow card) 27'	Report	Dabo (yellow card) 16'	Stadium: Stade Louis II; Attendance: 7,161; Referee: Benoît Millot

8 February 2015 24	Lyon	1–1	Paris Saint-Germain	Lyon
21:00 CET (UTC+01:00)	N'Jie 31'; Fekir (yellow card) 67'; Bedimo (yellow card) 68'; Gonalons (yellow card) 69'	Report	Cavani (yellow card) 43'; Ibrahimović 69' (pen.); Cabaye (yellow card) 81'	Stadium: Stade de Gerland; Attendance: 37,581; Referee: Clément Turpin

14 February 2015 25	Lorient	1–1	Lyon	Lorient
21:00 CET (UTC+01:00)	Ayew 50'	Report	Gonalons (yellow card) 45'; Bedimo (yellow card) 50'; N'Jie 78'; Jallet (yellow card) 86'; Koné (yellow card) 90+2'	Stadium: Stade du Moustoir; Attendance: 14,354; Referee: Stéphane Lannoy

21 February 2015 26	Lyon	1–0	Nantes	Lyon
17:00 CET (UTC+01:00)	Ferri (yellow card) 34'; Fekir 67'; Dabo (yellow card) 80'	Report	Deaux (yellow card) 31'; Bessat (yellow card) 45'; Djilobodji (yellow card) 54'; Gakpé (yellow card) 55'; Cissokho (yellow card) 59'; Vizcarrondo (yellow card) 90+5'	Stadium: Stade de Gerland; Attendance: 36,819; Referee: Fredy Fautrel

28 February 2015 27	Lille	2–1	Lyon	Villeneuve-d'Ascq
16:00 CET (UTC+01:00)	Lopes (yellow card) 51', (goal) 60'; Gueye 56'; Delaplace (yellow card) 80'	Report	Tolisso 2'; Bedimo (yellow card) 63'; Lacazette (yellow card) 78'	Stadium: Stade Pierre-Mauroy; Attendance: 40,080; Referee: Lionel Jaffredo

8 March 2015 28	Montpellier	1–5	Lyon	Montpellier
21:00 CEST (UTC+02:00)	Barrios 6'; Deplagne (yellow card) 26'; El Kaoutari (yellow card) 28'; Jourdren (yellow card) 29'; Sanson (yellow card) 63'	Report	Lacazette (yellow card) 9', (goal) 30' (pen.), 90+4'; Fekir 40', 72'; Jallet (yellow card) 45'; Rose (yellow card) 59'; Bedimo (yellow card) 65'; Umtiti (yellow card) 81'; Tolisso 90+1'	Stadium: Stade de la Mosson; Attendance: 16,431; Referee: Amaury Delerue

15 March 2015 29	Marseille	0–0	Lyon	Marseille
21:00 CEST (UTC+02:00)	Gignac (yellow card) 37'; Mendy (yellow card) 64'; Payet (yellow card) 84'; Morel (red card) 86'; Imbula (yellow card) 88'	Report	Ferri (yellow card) 25'; Rose (yellow card) 88'; Malbranque (yellow card) 90'	Stadium: Stade Vélodrome; Attendance: 62,832; Referee: Benoît Bastien

21 March 2015 30	Lyon	1–2	Nice	Lyon
16:00 CEST (UTC+02:00)	Fekir (yellow card) 30'; Koné (yellow card) 53'; Gonalons 56', (yellow card) 59'; N'Jie (yellow card) 62'	Report	Palun (yellow card) 5' (yellow-red card) 54'; Carlos Eduardo 23'; Pléa (yellow card) 79'; Koziello (yellow card) 83'; Eysseric 86'	Stadium: Stade de Gerland; Attendance: 36,300; Referee: Antony Gautier

4 April 2015 31	Guingamp	1–3	Lyon	Guingamp
17:00 CEST (UTC+02:00)	Pied (yellow card) 42'; Kerbrat (red card) 45'; Beauvue 80'	Report	Fekir 26'; Rose (yellow card) 35'; Lacazette 39' (pen.), (yellow card) 40'; N'Jie 61'	Stadium: Stade du Roudourou; Attendance: 17,381; Referee: Clément Turpin

12 April 2015 32	Lyon	2–0	Bastia	Lyon
18:30 CEST (UTC+02:00)	Koné (yellow card) 45+1'; Yattara 77'; Lacazette (yellow card) 80'; Umtiti 85'	Report		Stadium: Stade de Gerland; Attendance: 36,549; Referee: Lionel Jaffredo

18 April 2015 33	Lyon	2–2	Saint-Étienne	Lyon
21:00 CEST (UTC+02:00)	Tolisso (yellow card) 3'; N'Jie 24'; Rose (red card) 29'; Jallet 48'; Lopes (yellow card) 53'	Report	Erdinç (yellow card) 9'; Gradel 31' (pen.), (yellow card) 53'; Hamouma 45'; Clément (yellow card) 62'; Tabanou (yellow card) 66'; Corgnet (yellow card) 80'	Stadium: Stade de Gerland; Attendance: 37,715; Referee: Said Ennjimi

25 April 2015 34	Reims	2–4	Lyon	Reims
21:00 CEST (UTC+02:00)	Peuget 13', (yellow card) 82'; Charbonnier 90+2'	Report	Tolisso 2'; Lacazette 6', (yellow card) 61'; N'Jie 19'; Jallet (yellow card) 70'; Fekir (yellow card) 73'; Tacalfred 90' (o.g.)	Stadium: Stade Auguste Delaune; Attendance: 19,270; Referee: Fredy Fautrel

2 May 2015 35	Lyon	2–0	Evian	Lyon
17:00 CEST (UTC+02:00)	Grenier 21'; Lacazette 38' (pen.); Gonalons (yellow card) 65'	Report	Nounkeu (yellow card) 38'	Stadium: Stade de Gerland; Attendance: 36,839; Referee: Benoit Bastien

9 May 2015 36	Caen	3–0	Lyon	Caen
17:00 CEST (UTC+02:00)	Nangis (yellow card) 27'; Benezet 41', 44'; Privat 85'	Report	Lacazette (yellow card) 69'	Stadium: Stade Michel d'Ornano; Attendance: 19,842; Referee: Nicolas Rainville

16 May 2015 37	Lyon	1–1	Bordeaux	Lyon
21:00 CEST (UTC+02:00)	Fekir 9', (yellow card) 74'; Ferri (yellow card) 43'	Report	Crivelli 3'; Plašil (yellow card) 12'; Rolán (yellow card) 33'; Chantôme (yellow card) 39'; Guilbert (yellow card) 63'	Stadium: Stade de Gerland; Attendance: 39,961; Referee: Benoît Millot

23 May 2015 38	Rennes	0–1	Lyon	Rennes
21:00 CEST (UTC+02:00)		Report	N'Jie 86'	Stadium: Stade de la Route de Lorient; Attendance: 26,281; Referee: Philippe Kalt

=== Coupe de France ===
4 January 2015 Round of 64	Lens	2–3	Lyon	Amiens
14:15 CET (UTC+01:00)	Lemoigne (yellow card) 21'; Guillaume (yellow card) 26'; El Jadeyaoui 76' (pen.); Coulibaly 90'	Report	Fekir 5'; Lacazette 14' (pen.); Dabo 30'; Tolisso (yellow card) 34'	Stadium: Stade de la Licorne; Referee: Fredy Fautrel

20 January 2015 Round of 32	Nantes	3–2	Lyon	Nantes
21:00 CET (UTC+01:00)	Bessat 19', 21', 89'	Report 1, 2	Lacazette 5', (yellow card) 32'; Fekir 59'	Stadium: Stade de la Beaujoire; Attendance: 24,158; Referee: Lionel Jaffredo

=== Coupe de la Ligue ===
17 December 2014 Round of 16	Lyon	1–1 (a.e.t.) (4–5 p)	Monaco	Lyon
21:00 CET	Bedimo (yellow card) 47'; Lacazette 105'	Report	Diallo (yellow card) 15'; Carrasco (yellow card) 86', (goal) 94'; Fabinho (yellow card) 120'	Stadium: Stade de Gerland; Attendance: 21,541; Referee: Antony Gautier
	Penalties
	Gonalons (penalty scored); Lacazette (penalty scored); Ghezzal (penalty scored); Koné (penalty missed); Umtiti (penalty scored); Ferri (penalty missed)		(penalty missed) Toulalan; (penalty scored) López; (penalty scored) Martial; (penalty scored) Fabinho; (penalty scored) Silva; (penalty scored) Ocampos

=== UEFA Europa League ===
==== Third qualifying round ====
31 July 2014 First leg	Mladá Boleslav (Czech Republic)	1–4	(France) Lyon	Mladá Boleslav, Czech Republic
19:00 CEST (UTC+02:00)	Magera (yellow card) 13'; Rosa (yellow card) 26', (goal) 66'; Ďuriš (yellow card) 45+2'; Milla (yellow card) 73'	Report	Yattara 9', 47'; Gonalons (yellow card) 27', (goal) 36'; Umtiti 67'	Stadium: Městský stadion Attendance: 4,800; Referee: Tobias Welz (Germany)

7 August 2014 Second leg	Lyon (France)	2–1 (6–2 agg.)	(Czech Republic) Mladá Boleslav	Lyon, France
20:30 CEST (UTC+02:00)	Umtiti (yellow card) 52'; Lacazette 58'; Fekir (yellow card) 64'; Koné (yellow card) 71'; N'Jie 89'	Report	Bořil (yellow card) 15'; Rosa (yellow card) 23'; Ďuriš (yellow card) 43'; Navrátil (yellow card) 65'; Milla 71' (pen.); Šultes (yellow card) 76'	Stadium: Stade de Gerland; Attendance: 22,717; Referee: Stephan Klossner (Switzerland)

==== Play-off round ====
21 August 2014 First leg	Lyon (France)	1–2	(Romania) Astra Giurgiu	Lyon, France
20:30 CEST (UTC+02:00)	Malbranque 25'; Rose (yellow card) 44' (yellow-red card) 78'	Report	Morais (yellow card) 39'; Fatai 72'; Budescu 81' (pen.); Ben Youssef (yellow card) 82'; Enache (yellow card) 90+3'	Stadium: Stade de Gerland; Attendance: 20,001; Referee: Carlos Clos Gómez (Spain)

28 August 2014 Second leg	Astra Giurgiu (Romania)	0–1 (2 (a)–2 agg.)	(France) Lyon	Giurgiu, Romania
20:30 CEST (UTC+02:00)	Oros (yellow card) 45+3'; Enache (yellow card) 76'; Laban (yellow card) 85'; Morais (yellow card) 90+4'; Lung (yellow card) 90+4'	Report	Ferri 23'; Koné (yellow card) 55'; Gonalons (yellow card) 63'	Stadium: Stadionul Marin Anastasovici; Attendance: 7,200; Referee: Sergei Karasev (Russia)

== Statistics ==
=== Appearances and goals ===
No.	Pos	Nat	Player	Total		Ligue 1		Coupe de France		Coupe de la Ligue		UEFA Europa League	
No.	Pos	Nat	Player	Apps	Goals	Apps	Goals	Apps	Goals	Apps	Goals	Apps	Goals
Goalkeepers
1	GK	(Portugal) POR	Anthony Lopes	42	0	38	0	0	0	0	0	4	0
30	GK	(France) FRA	Mathieu Gorgelin	0	0	0	0	0	0	0	0	0	0
Defenders
2	DF	(Algeria) ALG	Mehdi Zeffane	5	0	1+3	0	0	0	0	0	1	0
3	DF	(Cameroon) CMR	Henri Bedimo	29	0	25+2	0	0	0	0	0	1+1	0
4	DF	(Burkina Faso) BFA	Bakary Koné	21	1	14+3	1	0	0	0	0	3+1	0
5	DF	(Serbia) SRB	Milan Biševac	14	0	13	0	0	0	0	0	1	0
13	DF	(France) FRA	Christophe Jallet	36	1	32	1	0	0	0	0	4	0
14	DF	(France) FRA	Mouhamadou Dabo	13	0	13	0	0	0	0	0	0	0
22	DF	(France) FRA	Lindsay Rose	17	0	13+2	0	0	0	0	0	2	0
23	DF	(France) FRA	Samuel Umtiti	37	2	35	1	0	0	0	0	2	1
Midfielders
6	MF	(France) FRA	Gueïda Fofana	2	0	0+2	0	0	0	0	0	0	0
7	MF	(France) FRA	Clément Grenier	7	1	4+2	1	0	0	0	0	0+1	0
8	MF	(France) FRA	Yoann Gourcuff	17	3	8+9	3	0	0	0	0	0	0
11	MF	(France) FRA	Rachid Ghezzal	20	0	6+12	0	0	0	0	0	1+1	0
12	MF	(France) FRA	Jordan Ferri	39	2	30+5	1	0	0	0	0	3+1	1
17	MF	(France) FRA	Steed Malbranque	32	4	13+15	3	0	0	0	0	4	1
18	MF	(France) FRA	Nabil Fekir	36	13	34	13	0	0	0	0	1+1	0
21	MF	(France) FRA	Maxime Gonalons	39	2	35	1	0	0	0	0	4	1
24	MF	(France) FRA	Corentin Tolisso	41	7	37+1	7	0	0	0	0	3	0
28	MF	(France) FRA	Arnold Mvuemba	23	0	10+10	0	0	0	0	0	1+2	0
29	MF	(France) FRA	Farès Bahlouli	6	0	0+4	0	0	0	0	0	1+1	0
Forwards
10	FW	(France) FRA	Alexandre Lacazette	37	28	33	27	0	0	0	0	4	1
19	FW	(Guinea) GUI	Mohamed Yattara	23	3	4+17	1	0	0	0	0	2	2
20	FW	(Cameroon) CMR	Clinton N'Jie	32	8	15+15	7	0	0	0	0	1+1	1
25	FW	(France) FRA	Yassine Benzia	12	2	3+7	2	0	0	0	0	1+1	0
27	FW	(France) FRA	Maxwel Cornet	4	0	1+3	0	0	0	0	0	0	0

Last updated: 30 May 2015
Source: BDFutbol
