= Nabil Fekir =

French footballer (born 1993)

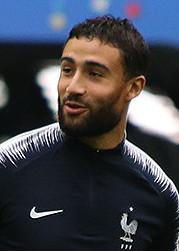
- Fekir training with France at the 2018 FIFA World Cup

Personal information
- Full name: Nabil Fekir
- Date of birth: 18 July 1993 (age 33)
- Place of birth: Lyon, France
- Height: 1.73 m (5 ft 8 in)
- Position: Attacking midfielder

Team information
- Current team: Abha
- Number: 10

Youth career
- 2000–2001: AC Villeurbanne
- 2001–2003: Vaulx-en-Velin
- 2003–2005: SC Caluire
- 2005–2007: Lyon
- 2007–2010: Vaulx-en-Velin
- 2010–2011: Saint-Priest
- 2011–2013: Lyon

Senior career*
Years	Team	Apps	(Gls)
2011–2013	Lyon B	63	(13)
2013–2019	Lyon	145	(54)
2019–2024	Real Betis	135	(21)
2024–2026	Al Jazira	39	(17)
2026–	Abha	10	(1)

International career
2014	France U21	1	(0)
2015–2020	France	25	(2)
Medal record
Men's football
Representing France
FIFA World Cup
Winner	2018 Russia
- * Club domestic league appearances and goals as of 14:30, 27 October 2026 (UTC)

Nabil Fekir (Arabic: نبيل فقير; born 18 July 1993) is a French professional footballer who plays as an attacking midfielder for Saudi Pro League club Abha.

An academy graduate of Lyon, he was promoted to the senior squad in July 2013. Fekir became a first-team regular in his second season, when he was named the Ligue 1 Young Player of the Year. He made 192 appearances for Les Gones, scoring 69 goals and also gaining team captaincy in 2017. In 2019, he transferred to Real Betis for an initial €19.75 million. He played 165 games and scored 29 goals for the club, winning the Copa del Rey in 2022. After five seasons with Betis, he signed for Emirati side Al Jazira in August 2024.

Fekir played 25 games for the France national team between 2015 and 2020, scoring twice. He was chosen in their squad that won the 2018 FIFA World Cup.

== Club career ==
=== Youth ===
Fekir joined the youth academy of Olympique Lyonnais at the age of 12, and two years later he was released for not being strong enough. He rejoined Vaulx-en-Velin and continued his youth career at Saint-Priest, where he was tracked by scouts from across France. At one point Lyon's local rivals Saint-Étienne were very keen to sign Fekir, but he held out for Lyon to sign him again in 2011. He said "I wanted to show Lyon that they made a mistake".

=== Lyon ===
Fekir was included in the Lyon first team squad for the first time on 30 July 2013, remaining as an unused substitute in 1–0 home win over Grasshopper in the Champions League third qualifying round first leg. He finally made his Lyon first team debut on 28 August 2013, replacing Yassine Benzia at half time in a 2–0 Champions League play-off round second leg away loss to Real Sociedad, which saw the club eliminated from the tournament after a 4–0 aggregate defeat. Three days later he made his Ligue 1 debut, playing the entire match in 2–1 away defeat to Evian TG. On 27 April 2014, against Bastia in a 4–1 Ligue 1 home win, he scored his first competitive goal (in the 23rd minute) for Lyon's first team and assisted one goal each for Bakary Koné and Alexandre Lacazette. Fekir made a total of 17 appearances in all competitions in his first season (2013–14) with Lyon's first team, scoring one goal.

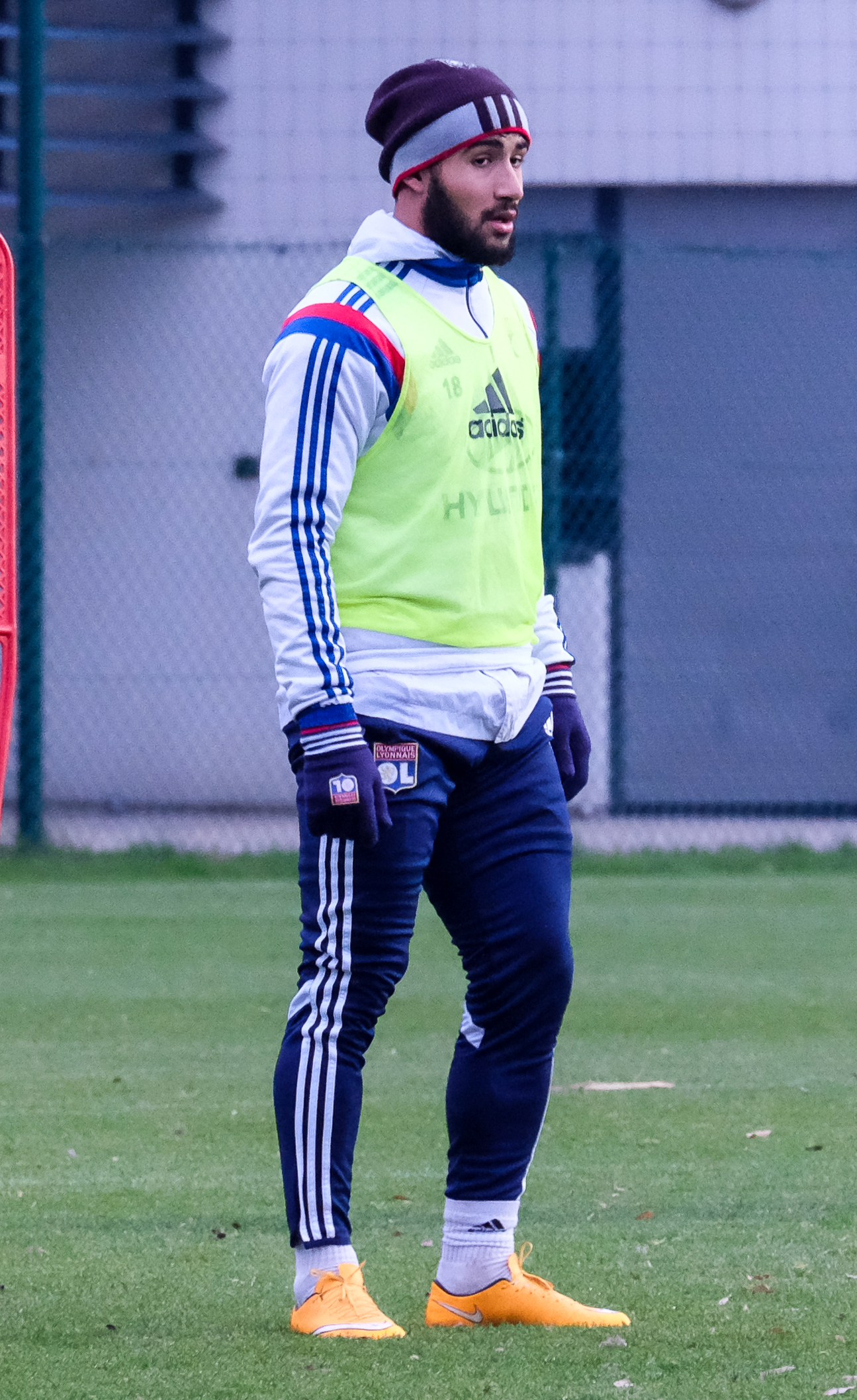
Fekir in training with Lyon in 2015

During the 2014–15 season, he featured regularly for the first team and by 19 March 2015 he had scored 11 goals and assisted 7 in 25 2014–15 season Ligue 1 games, earning him his first international call up. On 17 May 2015, he was named as the Ligue 1 Young Player of the Year and earned a spot in the Team of the Year. He finished the 2014–15 Ligue 1 season with 13 goals and 9 assists.

On 29 August 2015, Fekir scored a hat-trick in a 4–0 Ligue 1 away win at Caen. He missed most of the 2015–16 season with torn knee ligaments.

On 23 February 2017, Fekir scored a hat-trick and assisted Mouctar Diakhaby's 89th-minute goal) in the 2016–17 Europa League round of 32 second-leg 7–1 home win over AZ Alkmaar to be on the scoresheet of a UEFA Europa League or UEFA Champions League match for the first time in his career, by 23 February he had scored 10 goals and provided 10 assists in all competitions for the 2016–17 season.

In early August 2017, following the transfer of Maxime Gonalons to AS Roma a month earlier, Fekir was named captain of the club. On 5 November, he scored two goals in a 5–0 away Ligue 1 victory over fierce rivals AS Saint-Etienne. After Fekir scored his second goal in the 84th minute, he took off his shirt and brandished his name and number to the Saint-Étienne supporters, who threw objects and spilled onto the field, outraged by the gesture. Referee Clément Turpin led the players away from the field and riot police ran onto the field to restore order. The match was stopped for 40 minutes before the two teams could play out its final five minutes in a virtually empty Stade Geoffroy-Guichard.

In the 2017–18 season, Fekir was part of a prolific forward line alongside Memphis Depay and Mariano; Fekir contributed 18 goals, with the former contributing 19, and the latter totalling 18 for the team. In June 2018, English side Liverpool negotiated with Lyon for the transfer of Fekir, offering a maximum €60 million. Fekir even agreed personal terms, before the transfer collapsed due to a knee issue that appeared during the medical. In September 2021, Fekir said that the injury story was a cover explanation, and that the move actually collapsed due to his agent.

=== Real Betis ===
On 22 July 2019, Fekir signed a four-year contract with Spanish club Real Betis for an initial fee of €19.75 million and €10 million in add-ons. Lyon will receive 20% of any future sale of the player and as part of the deal, Fekir's younger brother Yassin also transferred between the two clubs. He made his La Liga debut for Los Verdiblancos on 18 August, playing the full 90 minutes in a 2–1 defeat against Real Valladolid, and scored his first goal a week later to open a 5–2 loss against Barcelona. On 9 February 2020, against the same team, he scored in a 3–2 loss and was sent off for two yellow cards – the latter being for dissent towards the first; referee José María Sánchez Martínez was rested for the next weekend due to controversial calls affecting both sides. He was dismissed again on 1 July just before half time in a 2–0 home loss to Villarreal CF, again for a foul and dissent.

Fekir lasted just 11 minutes on the pitch on 21 April 2021 before being sent off for a foul on Unai Vencedor in a goalless draw with Athletic Bilbao at the Estadio Benito Villamarín. In the final game of the season on 22 May, he equalised as the team came from behind to win 3–2 at RC Celta de Vigo and cement sixth place to qualify for the Europa League.

On 4 November 2021, in a 4–0 loss at Bayer 04 Leverkusen, Fekir was sent off for a confrontation with Kerem Demirbay. After the game, Betis captain Joaquín said that his actions should not have happened because they "stain football". He scored twice along the way as his team won the Copa del Rey, including the equaliser in a 2–1 home win over Sevilla FC in the Seville derby in the last 16 on 15 January 2022; following his goal, the match was abandoned and then continued behind closed doors the next day, as Sevilla's Joan Jordán was struck by a metal bar thrown from the crowd. In the same month, his contract was extended to 2026.

Fekir, Betis teammate Borja Iglesias and opponent Gonzalo Montiel were all sent off on 6 November 2022 in a 1–1 derby draw with Sevilla; he received his red card just before half time for an elbow on Papu Gómez, who reflected that it was harshly given. On 24 February 2023, he suffered an anterior cruciate ligament injury away to Elche CF, and was ruled out for the rest of the season, returning in early November 2023.

=== Al Jazira ===
On 30 August 2024, Fekir joined UAE Pro League club Al Jazira for a fee of €6 million.

=== Abha ===
On 28 July 2026, Fekir signed a two-year contract with Saudi Pro League side Abha.

== International career ==
Fekir made one appearance for the France U21 national team, coming on as a substitute (in the 75th minute) for Corentin Tolisso in the 2015 UEFA European Under-21 Championship qualification play-offs second-leg away match against Sweden on 15 October 2014; France lost the match 4–1 and 4–3 on aggregate and hence did not qualify for the final phase of the 2015 UEFA European Under-21 Championship in the Czech Republic.

Fekir was named in his ancestral Algeria's squad for friendlies against Oman and Qatar in March 2015. However, he withdrew to take part in the French squad for friendlies against Brazil and Denmark. Upon selecting him for the France senior squad, then-manager Didier Deschamps stated: "Fekir is a player with great potential. I consider that he can bring us something different. He plays in a different role to the others. He can score and set up others to score well." Fekir made his France senior team debut on 26 March 2015 against the former at the Stade de France, replacing Antoine Griezmann for the final 16 minutes of a 3–1 defeat. He scored his first goal for the France senior team on 7 June 2015, in a 4–3 home friendly defeat to Belgium. On 4 September 2015, he made his first start for the France senior team in a 1–0 away friendly win over Portugal during which he ruptured three ligaments in his right knee, putting him out of action for an estimated six months. On 25 August 2016, Fekir was called back up to the senior squad for the first time since his injury for a friendly against Italy and a 2018 FIFA World Cup qualification match against Belarus. He had to withdraw from the squad three days later, however, due to an injury. On 7 October, he made his competitive debut for France as an 83rd-minute substitute for Antoine Griezmann in the 2018 World Cup qualifying 4–1 win over Bulgaria at the Stade de France.

He was selected in the 23-man France national team for the 2018 FIFA World Cup in Russia. He played the last nine minutes of the final, a 4–2 win over Croatia at the Luzhniki Stadium, in place of Olivier Giroud.

== Personal life ==
Fekir was born to Algerian parents, who are originally from Menaceur, a small town in Tipaza, Algeria. His father settled in France in 1992 and worked in a metallurgy factory for a long time, while his mother was a social worker. He is the oldest of the family's four brothers. His brother, Yassin Fekir, also made his professional debut at Lyon and transferred with him to Betis. Fekir is a Muslim, and gives to charity when unable to fast for Ramadan during the football season.

== Career statistics ==
=== Club ===
As of match played 27 October 2026

Appearances and goals by club, season and competition
Club	Season	League			National cup (Note: Includes Coupe de France, Copa del Rey, UAE President's Cup, King's Cup)		League cup (Note: Includes Coupe de la Ligue, UAE League Cup)		Continental		Other		Total	
Club	Season	Division	Apps	Goals	Apps	Goals	Apps	Goals	Apps	Goals	Apps	Goals	Apps	Goals
Lyon	2013–14	Ligue 1	11	1	0	0	2	0	4 (Note: One appearance in UEFA Champions League, three appearances in UEFA Europa League)	0	—		17	1
Lyon	2014–15	Ligue 1	34	13	2	2	1	0	2 (Note: Appearances in UEFA Europa League)	0	—		39	15
Lyon	2015–16	Ligue 1	9	4	0	0	0	0	0	0	—		9	4
Lyon	2016–17	Ligue 1	32	9	2	1	1	0	13 (Note: Five appearances in UEFA Champions League, eight appearances and four goals in UEFA Europa League)	4	1 (Note: Appearance in Trophée des Champions)	0	49	14
Lyon	2017–18	Ligue 1	30	18	2	2	0	0	8	3	—		40	23
Lyon	2018–19	Ligue 1	29	9	3	0	1	0	6 (Note: Appearances in UEFA Champions League)	3	—		39	12
Lyon	Total		145	54	9	5	5	0	33	10	1	0	193	69
Real Betis	2019–20	La Liga	32	7	1	0	—		—		—		33	7
Real Betis	2020–21	La Liga	33	5	5	0	—		—		—		38	5
Real Betis	2021–22	La Liga	34	6	6	2	—		7	2	—		47	10
Real Betis	2022–23	La Liga	15	2	1	1	—		3	2	1 (Note: Appearance in Supercopa de España)	1	20	6
Real Betis	2023–24	La Liga	19	1	1	0	—		4 (Note: Two appearances in UEFA Europa League, two appearances in UEFA Europa Conference League)	0	—		24	1
Real Betis	2024–25	La Liga	2	0	—		—		1 (Note: Appearance in UEFA Conference League)	0	—		3	0
Real Betis	Total		135	21	14	3	—		15	4	1	1	165	29
Al Jazira	2024–25	UAE Pro League	20	8	2	0	6	1	—		—		28	9
Al Jazira	2025–26	UAE Pro League	19	9	3	1	4	0	—		1 (Note: Appearance in UAE–Qatar Super Shield)	0	27	10
Al Jazira	Total		39	17	5	1	10	1	—		1	0	55	19
Abha	2026–27	Saudi Pro League	10	1	1	0	—		—		—		11	1
Career total			327	91	28	9	12	1	48	14	3	1	419	116

=== International ===
Appearances and goals by national team and year
National team	Year	Apps	Goals
France	2015	5	1
France	2016	2	0
France	2017	3	0
France	2018	10	1
France	2019	4	0
France	2020	1	0
Total		25	2

Scores and results list France's goal tally first, score column indicates score after each Fekir goal.

List of international goals scored by Nabil Fekir
No.	Date	Venue	Cap	Opponent	Score	Result	Competition
1	7 June 2015	Stade de France, Saint-Denis, France	3	Belgium	2–4	3–4	Friendly
2	28 May 2018	Stade de France, Saint-Denis, France	11	Republic of Ireland	2–0	2–0	Friendly

== Honours ==
Real Betis

- Copa del Rey: 2021–22

Al Jazira

- UAE League Cup: 2024–25

France

- FIFA World Cup: 2018

Individual

- UNFP Ligue 1 Young Player of the Year: 2014–15
- UNFP Ligue 1 Team of the Year: 2014–15, 2017–18
- UNFP Ligue 1 Player of the Month: October 2017
- La Liga Team of the Season: 2021–22
- La Liga Play of the Month: April 2024 (with Isco)

Orders

- Knight of the Legion of Honour: 2018
