= Anthony Lopes =

Footballer (born 1990)

Anthony Lopes ComM
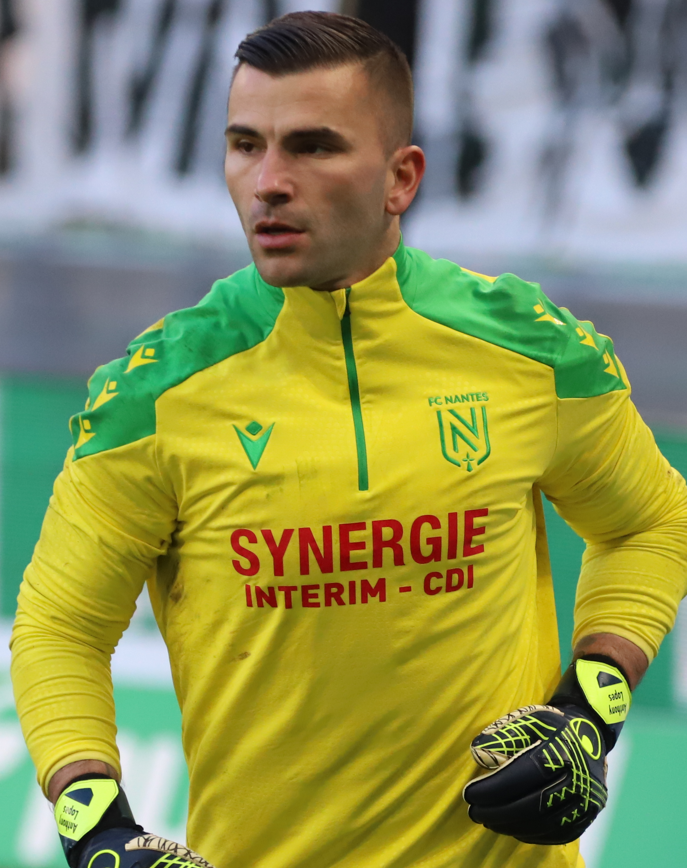
- Lopes with Nantes in 2025

Personal information
- Full name: Anthony Lopes
- Date of birth: 1 October 1990 (age 36)
- Place of birth: Givors, France
- Height: 1.84 m (6 ft 0 in)
- Position: Goalkeeper

Team information
- Current team: Angers
- Number: 1

Youth career
- 1996–2000: OSGL Football
- 2000–2008: Lyon

Senior career*
Years	Team	Apps	(Gls)
2008–2012	Lyon B	41	(0)
2012–2024	Lyon	378	(0)
2025–2026	Nantes	50	(0)
2026–	Angers	11	(0)

International career
2007	Portugal U17	6	(0)
2007	Portugal U18	1	(0)
2007–2009	Portugal U19	17	(0)
2010	Portugal U20	1	(0)
2011–2013	Portugal U21	11	(0)
2015–2021	Portugal	14	(0)
Medal record
Men's football
Representing Portugal
UEFA European Championship
Winner	2016 France
- * Club domestic league appearances and goals as of 17:27, 22 November 2026 (UTC)

Anthony Lopes (European Portuguese: [ˈɐ̃ntõni ˈlɔpɨʃ]; born 1 October 1990) is a professional footballer who plays as a goalkeeper for Ligue 1 club Angers.

He came through the youth ranks at Lyon, being called to the first team in 2011 and making his debut the following year. He made 489 appearances for the club, including the Coupe de la Ligue finals of 2014 and 2020.

Born in France, Lopes represented Portugal internationally, totalling 36 caps at youth level including 11 for the under-21 team. He made his senior debut for the country in March 2015, and was chosen for Euro 2016, the 2018 World Cup and Euro 2020.

== Club career ==
=== Lyon ===
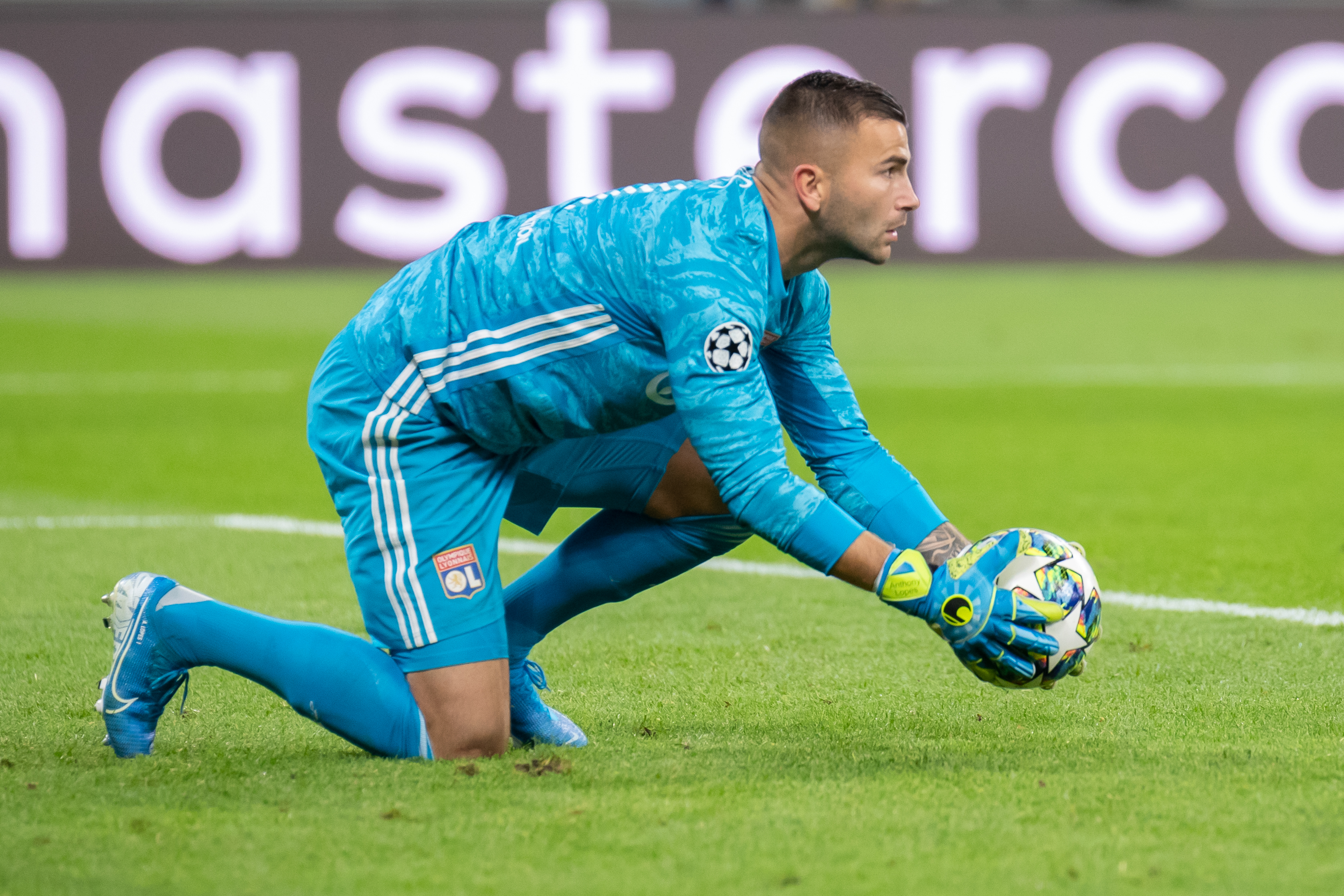
Lopes playing for Lyon in 2019

Born in Givors in metropolitan Lyon to Portuguese parents, Lopes joined local Lyon's youth system at the age of 9. He was promoted to the first team for the 2012–13 season, acting as third choice behind Rémy Vercoutre and Mathieu Valverde. His first match as a professional took place on 31 October 2012, in a 3–1 away loss against Nice in the Coupe de la Ligue. On 6 December he first appeared in the UEFA Europa League, in a 2–0 home win over Hapoel Ironi Kiryat Shmona that allowed the team to advance unbeaten into the knockout stages.

Lopes' maiden appearance in Ligue 1 took place on 28 April 2013, in a 1–1 home draw against Saint-Étienne in the Derby du Rhône where he made an early close-range save from Pierre-Emerick Aubameyang, later conceding the first goal from a Kurt Zouma header. This was the first of five league matches he played for the main squad at the end of the campaign, ending with a 2–0 home defeat of Rennes which saw Lyon finishing in third place and qualifying for the UEFA Champions League.

After Vercourtre went down with an injury, Lopes became the starter and retained his position after the former's recovery, even though he would also be afflicted by a double vertebra fracture in early November 2013. He featured in their run to the domestic League Cup final, where they lost 2–1 to Paris Saint-Germain in the decisive match at the Stade de France on 19 April 2014.

On 3 December 2016, during a league game, Lopes was hit by a firecracker thrown from the stands as he was laying injured in the penalty area at the Stade Saint-Symphorien, home to Metz. He made his 300th appearance on 27 August 2019 in a 1–0 loss at Montpellier, and the following day extended his contract until 2023.

Lopes played in the French league cup final on 29 July 2020, the last in the competition's history. He kept the game scoreless over 120 minutes against PSG before defeat in a penalty shootout. On 3 October 2021, he was sent off for the first time in a 1–1 away draw with Saint-Étienne, for handling the ball outside the area; he was suspended for two matches. The following 9 January, in a home fixture of the same score against PSG, he made his 400th appearance.

In June 2022, Lopes extended his contract to last until 2025. On 28 February 2023, he played in a 2–1 home win over Grenoble in the quarter-finals of the Coupe de France despite having a broken finger. After maintaining the starting role in the 2023–24 league season, he was benched for the latter stages of the cup campaign for younger Brazilian Lucas Perri, including the 2–1 final loss to PSG.

In 2024–25, still under manager Pierre Sage, Lopes went from first to third-choice behind Perri and Rémy Descamps. In an interview to newspaper L'Équipe on the day of his 34th birthday, he mentioned what he perceived to be a disrespectful treatment of him by the club.

=== Nantes ===
On 30 December 2024, Lopes terminated his contract with Lyon by mutual consent and moved to Nantes. The following 15 February, he was in goal as his team (reduced to ten players early on) was thrashed 7–1 at Monaco.

=== Angers ===
In June 2026, Lopes remained in the French top division by signing a two-year deal with Angers.

== International career ==
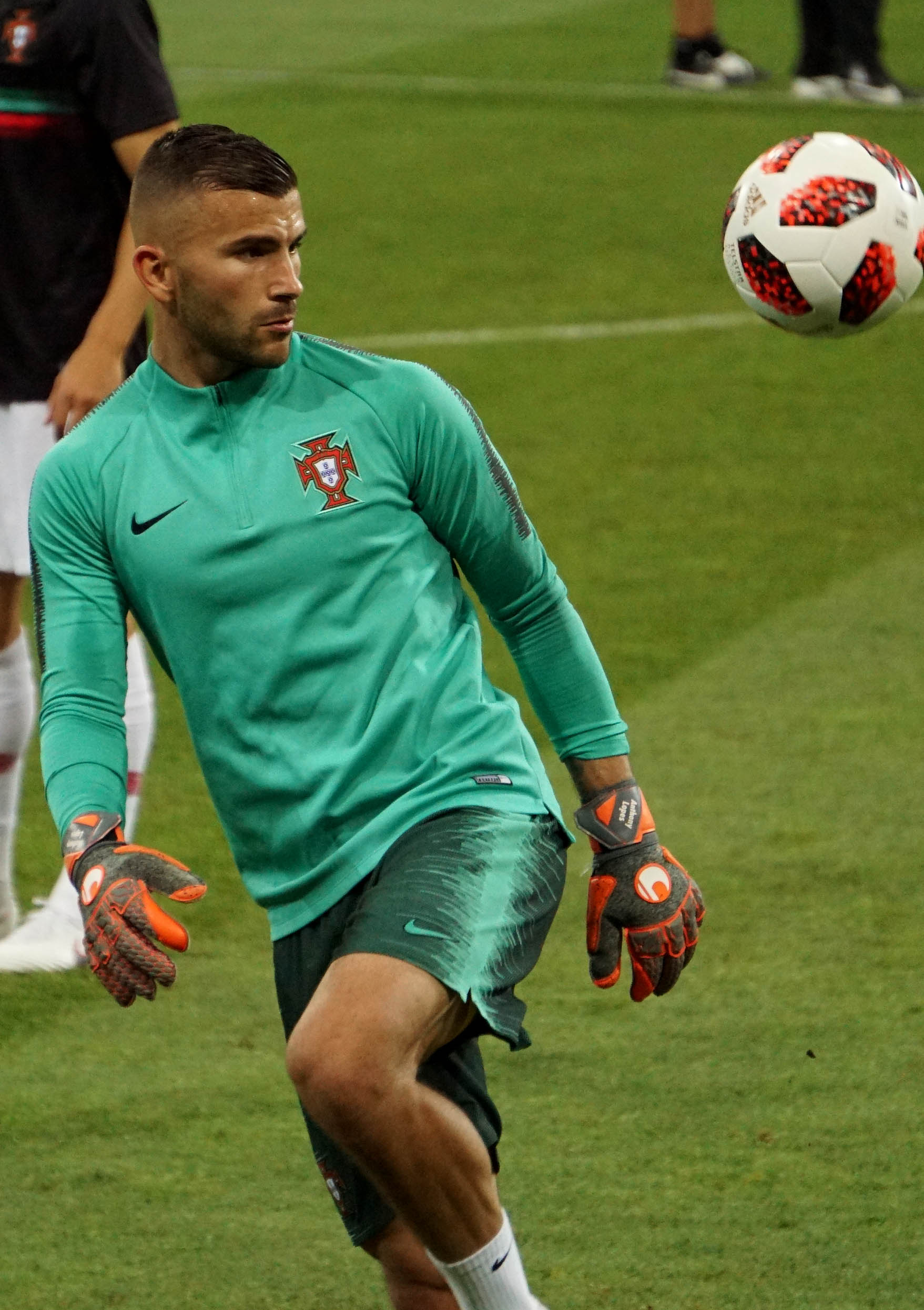
Lopes with Portugal at the 2018 World Cup

Lopes opted to represent Portugal, so his father made a phone call to the Portuguese Football Federation to alert to this fact, and he first appeared with the under-21 side on 9 February 2011, playing the first 45 minutes of a 3–1 friendly win against Sweden in Cartaxo. On 4 September 2013, he received his first callup to the full side due to injury to Sevilla's Beto.

On 31 March 2015, Lopes made his debut for the main squad, in a 2–0 friendly defeat to Cape Verde at the Estádio António Coimbra da Mota in Estoril. The following 17 May, he was selected by manager Fernando Santos for his UEFA Euro 2016 squad.

Lopes was also picked for the 2018 FIFA World Cup in Russia. After a break of over two years, he returned to the field for his first competitive cap on 5 September 2020 in a 4–1 home victory over Croatia in the UEFA Nations League.

In October 2022, Lopes was named in a preliminary 55-man squad for the World Cup in Qatar. He was cut from the final list, and made 14 appearances in six years.

== Personal life ==
Lopes and his family supported Porto, reflecting their northern roots. His father migrated as a baby from Barcelos, while his French-born mother had parents from Miranda do Douro.

== Career statistics ==
=== Club ===
As of match played 22 November 2026

Appearances and goals by club, season and competition
Club	Season	League			National cup		League cup		Europe		Other		Total	
Club	Season	Division	Apps	Goals	Apps	Goals	Apps	Goals	Apps	Goals	Apps	Goals	Apps	Goals
Lyon B	2008–09	CFA	6	0	—		—		—		—		6	0
Lyon B	2009–10	CFA	7	0	—		—		—		—		7	0
Lyon B	2010–11	CFA	5	0	—		—		—		—		5	0
Lyon B	2011–12	CFA	20	0	—		—		—		—		20	0
Lyon B	2012–13	CFA	3	0	—		—		—		—		3	0
Lyon B	Total		41	0	—		—		—		—		41	0
Lyon	2012–13	Ligue 1	5	0	0	0	1	0	1 (Note: Appearances in UEFA Europa League)	0	—		7	0
Lyon	2013–14	Ligue 1	32	0	0	0	4	0	13 (Note: Four appearances in UEFA Champions League, nine appearances in UEFA Europa League)	0	—		49	0
Lyon	2014–15	Ligue 1	38	0	2	0	1	0	4	0	—		45	0
Lyon	2015–16	Ligue 1	37	0	3	0	0	0	6 (Note: Appearances in UEFA Champions League)	0	1 (Note: Appearance in Trophée des Champions)	0	47	0
Lyon	2016–17	Ligue 1	37	0	2	0	0	0	14 (Note: Six appearances in UEFA Champions League, eight appearances in UEFA Europa League)	0	1	0	54	0
Lyon	2017–18	Ligue 1	34	0	4	0	0	0	10	0	—		48	0
Lyon	2018–19	Ligue 1	34	0	5	0	0	0	8	0	—		47	0
Lyon	2019–20	Ligue 1	26	0	4	0	1	0	10	0	—		41	0
Lyon	2020–21	Ligue 1	38	0	1	0	—		—		—		39	0
Lyon	2021–22	Ligue 1	34	0	0	0	—		8	0	—		42	0
Lyon	2022–23	Ligue 1	32	0	5	0	—		—		—		37	0
Lyon	2023–24	Ligue 1	31	0	2	0	—		—		—		33	0
Lyon	2024–25	Ligue 1	0	0	0	0	—		0	0	—		0	0
Lyon	Total		378	0	28	0	7	0	74	0	2	0	489	0
Nantes	2024–25	Ligue 1	18	0	0	0	—		—		—		18	0
Nantes	2025–26	Ligue 1	32	0	1	0	—		—		—		33	0
Nantes	Total		50	0	1	0	—		—		—		51	0
Angers	2026–27	Ligue 1	11	0	0	0	—		—		—		11	0
Career total			480	0	29	0	7	0	74	0	2	0	592	0

=== International ===
Appearances and goals by national team and year
National team	Year	Apps	Goals
Portugal	2015	2	0
Portugal	2016	2	0
Portugal	2017	1	0
Portugal	2018	2	0
Portugal	2020	3	0
Portugal	2021	4	0
Total		14	0

== Honours ==
Lyon

- Coupe de la Ligue runner-up: 2013–14, 2019–20
- Coupe de France runner-up: 2023–24

Portugal

- UEFA European Championship: 2016

Individual

- UEFA Champions League Squad of the Season: 2019–20

Orders

- Commander of the Order of Merit
