= Jordan Ferri =

French professional footballer (born 1992)

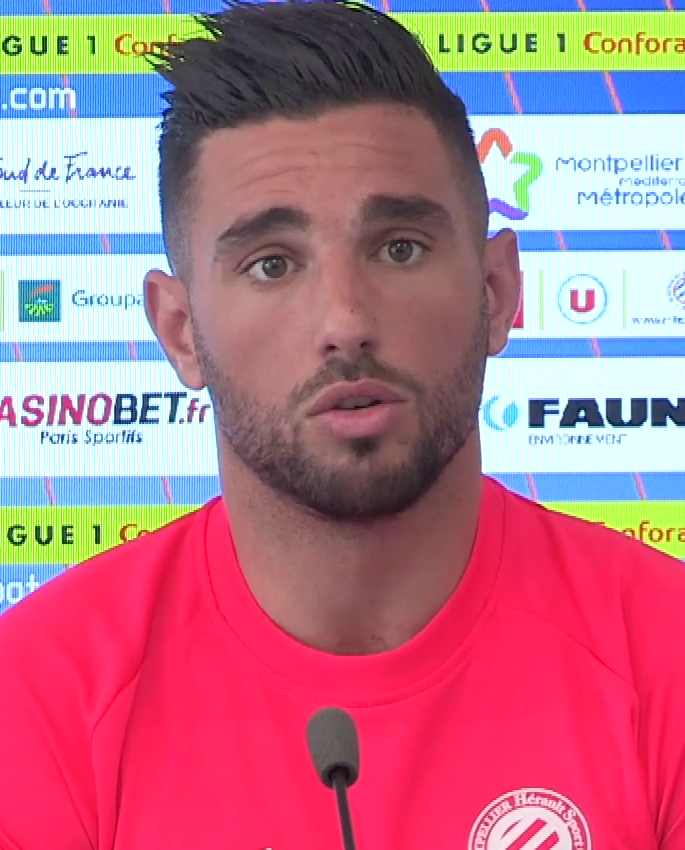
- Ferri with Montpellier in 2019

Personal information
- Date of birth: 12 March 1992 (age 34)
- Place of birth: Cavaillon, France
- Height: 1.73 m (5 ft 8 in)
- Position: Midfielder

Youth career
- 1998–2007: AS Saint-Rémoise
- 2007–2010: Lyon

Senior career*
Years	Team	Apps	(Gls)
2010–2018	Lyon B	67	(11)
2012–2019	Lyon	161	(7)
2018–2019	→ Nîmes (loan)	24	(2)
2019–2025	Montpellier	173	(2)
2025–2026	Sampdoria	5	(0)

International career
2013	France U20	3	(0)
2013–2014	France U21	6	(1)
- * Club domestic league appearances and goals as of 2 September 2026

Jordan Ferri (born 12 March 1992) is a French professional footballer who plays as a midfielder, most recently for Serie B club Sampdoria.

He principally plays as a defensive midfielder and is known for his passing ability.

== Club career ==
Ferri made his debut in the Europa League on 8 November 2012 against Athletic Bilbao, replacing Alexandre Lacazette in the 82nd minute. He made his league debut on 12 December against Nancy, replacing Anthony Réveillère after 30 minutes. On 22 November 2018, Ferri joined fellow Ligue 1 side Nîmes on loan until the end of the season. At the beginning of the 2019–2020 season, Ferri joined Montpellier.

On 7 August 2025, Ferri signed a two-season contract with Sampdoria in Italy. On 1 September 2026, Sampdoria announced the departure of Ferri by mutual agreement.

== Career statistics ==
As of 17 May 2025

Appearances and goals by club, season and competition
Club	Season	League			National cup		League cup		Continental		Other		Total	
Club	Season	Division	Apps	Goals	Apps	Goals	Apps	Goals	Apps	Goals	Apps	Goals	Apps	Goals
Lyon	2012–13	Ligue 1	7	0	–		–		3	0	–		10	0
Lyon	2013–14	Ligue 1	29	3	1	0	1	0	11	1	–		42	4
Lyon	2014–15	Ligue 1	35	1	2	0	1	0	4	1	–		42	2
Lyon	2015–16	Ligue 1	34	2	2	0	2	0	5	1	1	0	44	3
Lyon	2016–17	Ligue 1	28	1	1	0	1	0	5	2	1	0	36	3
Lyon	2017–18	Ligue 1	24	0	3	0	1	0	6	0	–		34	0
Lyon	2018–19	Ligue 1	4	0	0	0	0	0	1	0	–		5	0
Lyon	Total		161	7	9	0	6	0	35	5	2	0	213	12
Nîmes (loan)	2018–19	Ligue 1	24	2	1	0	0	0	–		–		25	2
Montpellier	2019–20	Ligue 1	16	0	3	0	0	0	–		–		19	0
Montpellier	2020–21	Ligue 1	34	0	4	1	–		–		–		38	1
Montpellier	2021–22	Ligue 1	34	0	2	0	–		–		–		36	0
Montpellier	2022–23	Ligue 1	34	1	1	0	–		–		–		35	1
Montpellier	2023–24	Ligue 1	30	1	3	0	–		–		–		33	1
Montpellier	2024–25	Ligue 1	25	0	1	0	–		–		–		26	0
Montpellier	Total		173	2	14	1	0	0	0	0	0	0	187	3
Career total			358	11	24	1	6	0	35	5	2	0	425	17

== Honours ==
Lyon

- Trophée des Champions: 2012
