= Maxime Gonalons =

French footballer (born 1989)

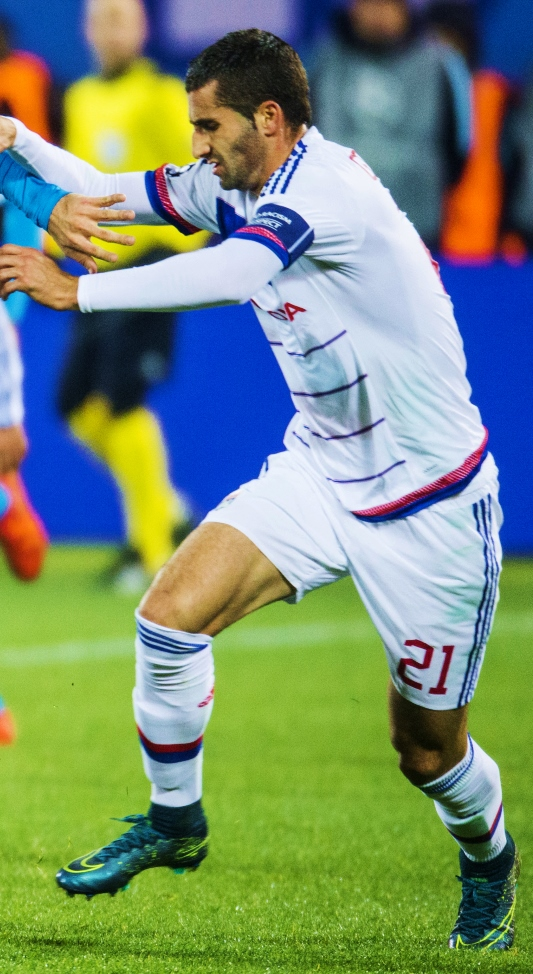
- Gonalons with Lyon in 2015

Personal information
- Full name: Maxime Gonalons
- Date of birth: 10 March 1989 (age 37)
- Place of birth: Vénissieux, France
- Height: 1.87 m (6 ft 2 in)
- Position: Defensive midfielder

Youth career
- 1997–2000: Villefranche
- 2000–2009: Lyon

Senior career*
Years	Team	Apps	(Gls)
2009–2017	Lyon	242	(7)
2017–2020	Roma	16	(0)
2018–2019	→ Sevilla (loan)	10	(0)
2019–2020	→ Granada (loan)	19	(0)
2020–2022	Granada	50	(0)
2022–2024	Clermont	46	(2)
Total		383	(9)

International career
2009–2010	France U21	6	(0)
2011–2015	France	8	(0)
- * Club domestic league appearances and goals

Maxime Gonalons (born 10 March 1989) is a French former professional footballer who played as a defensive midfielder.

== Club career ==
=== Youth career ===
Gonalons had been with Lyon since the age of 10 climbing through the club's youth sections after joining the club from local outfit Villefranche. For the 2007–08 season, at the age of 18, he was promoted to the club's Championnat de France Amateur team appearing in 26 matches scoring two goals. Lyon finished in a respectable 7th in their group, but weren't allowed progression to the playoffs. The next season, he again spent with the CFA squad, however, during the summer leading up to the season, Gonalons picked up a staph infection on his ankle, which was, at one point, deemed career threatening with reportedly future diagnosis of sepsis and amputation. However, over the course of the season, Gonalons gradually got back into playing shape and eventually returned to the team. He made 24 appearances scoring 3 goals, one each against local rivals Lyon Duchère and Saint-Étienne, and one against Marignane. Lyon finished first among professional clubs in the group and qualified for the playoffs. Gonalons started both the 4–3 semi-final win on penalties and the 3–0 victory over Sochaux in the final picking up a yellow card.

=== Lyon ===
Following the season, on 6 July 2009, Gonalons signed his first professional contract agreeing to a one-year deal with the club. The club does have the option to keep him for the next two seasons over after the one-year deal expires. Gonalons was assigned the number 41 shirt and trained with the senior team during pre-season. He made his professional debut on 25 August 2009 in the second leg of the club's UEFA Champions League play-off round match against Anderlecht appearing as a substitute in the 73rd minute for Jérémy Toulalan.

On 20 October, after coming on as a 42nd-minute substitute for the injured Cris, Gonalons scored his first professional goal against Liverpool at Anfield, in the 72nd minute, in the UEFA Champions League. The equalizing goal drew the match level at 1–1 and Lyon went on to win the match 2–1 with a goal from César Delgado in injury time. On 16 January 2010, Gonalons scored his first career league goal against Nancy. Ten days later, Gonalons and Lyon agreed to contract extension, which will keep the midfielder at the club until 2014.

Gonalons played a total of 330 games for Lyon and is eighth on the all time appearance list for the club.

=== Roma ===
On 3 July 2017, Gonalons signed a four-year contract with Roma.

==== Sevilla (loan) ====
On 20 August 2018, Sevilla announced the signing of Gonalons on a season-long loan.

=== Granada ===
On 2 September 2019, Gonalons joined Granada in the Spanish top tier, on a one-year loan deal. He signed permanently with the club for €4 million.

=== Clermont and retirement ===
On 1 July 2022, Gonalons returned to France and signed with Clermont for two years with an option to extend. On 29 May 2024, it was confirmed that he would leave at the end of his contract.

On 16 October 2024, free agent Gonalons announced his retirement from professional football at the age of 35.

== International career ==
On 11 November 2011, Gonalons received his first cap for the French senior team in a friendly match against the United States.

== Personal life ==
Gonalons was born in Vénissieux, Metropolis of Lyon. He is the cousin of the footballer Lucas Camelo.

== Career statistics ==
=== Club ===
Appearances and goals by club, season and competition
Club	Season	League			National cup (Note: Includes Coupe de France, Coppa Italia, Copa del Rey)		League cup (Note: Includes Coupe de la Ligue)		Europe		Other		Total	
Club	Season	Division	Apps	Goals	Apps	Goals	Apps	Goals	Apps	Goals	Apps	Goals	Apps	Goals
Lyon	2009–10	Ligue 1	15	1	1	0	2	0	9 (Note: Appearances in UEFA Champions League)	1	—		27	2
Lyon	2010–11	Ligue 1	23	0	0	0	1	0	4	0	—		28	0
Lyon	2011–12	Ligue 1	35	1	5	0	4	0	8	1	—		52	3
Lyon	2012–13	Ligue 1	35	3	1	0	0	0	6 (Note: Appearances in UEFA Europa League)	1	1 (Note: Appearance in Trophée des Champions)	0	43	4
Lyon	2013–14	Ligue 1	36	0	2	0	4	0	12 (Note: Four appearances in UEFA Champions League, eight appearances and one goal in UEFA Europa League)	1	—		54	1
Lyon	2014–15	Ligue 1	35	1	2	0	1	0	4	1	—		42	2
Lyon	2015–16	Ligue 1	33	0	3	0	1	0	5	0	1	0	43	0
Lyon	2016–17	Ligue 1	30	1	2	0	0	0	12 (Note: Six appearances in UEFA Champions League, six appearances in UEFA Europa League)	0	1	0	45	1
Lyon	Total		242	7	16	0	13	0	60	5	3	0	334	13
Roma	2017–18	Serie A	16	0	1	0	—		6	0	—		23	0
Sevilla (loan)	2018–19	La Liga	10	0	0	0	—		3	1	—		13	1
Granada (loan)	2019–20	La Liga	19	0	6	1	—		—		—		25	1
Granada	2020–21	La Liga	25	0	0	0	—		15	0	—		40	0
Granada	2021–22	La Liga	25	0	0	0	—		—		—		25	0
Granada	Total		50	0	0	0	—		15	0	—		65	0
Clermont	2022–23	Ligue 1	25	1	0	0	—		—		—		25	1
Clermont	2023–24	Ligue 1	21	1	2	0	—		—		—		23	1
Clermont	Total		46	2	2	0	—		—		—		48	2
Career total			383	9	25	1	13	0	84	6	3	0	508	16

=== International ===
Appearances and goals by national team and year
National team	Year	Apps	Goals
France	2011	2	0
France	2012	4	0
France	2014	1	0
France	2015	1	0
Total		8	0

== Honours ==
Lyon

- Coupe de France: 2011–12
- Trophée des Champions: 2012
