= Henri Bedimo =

Cameroonian footballer (born 1984)

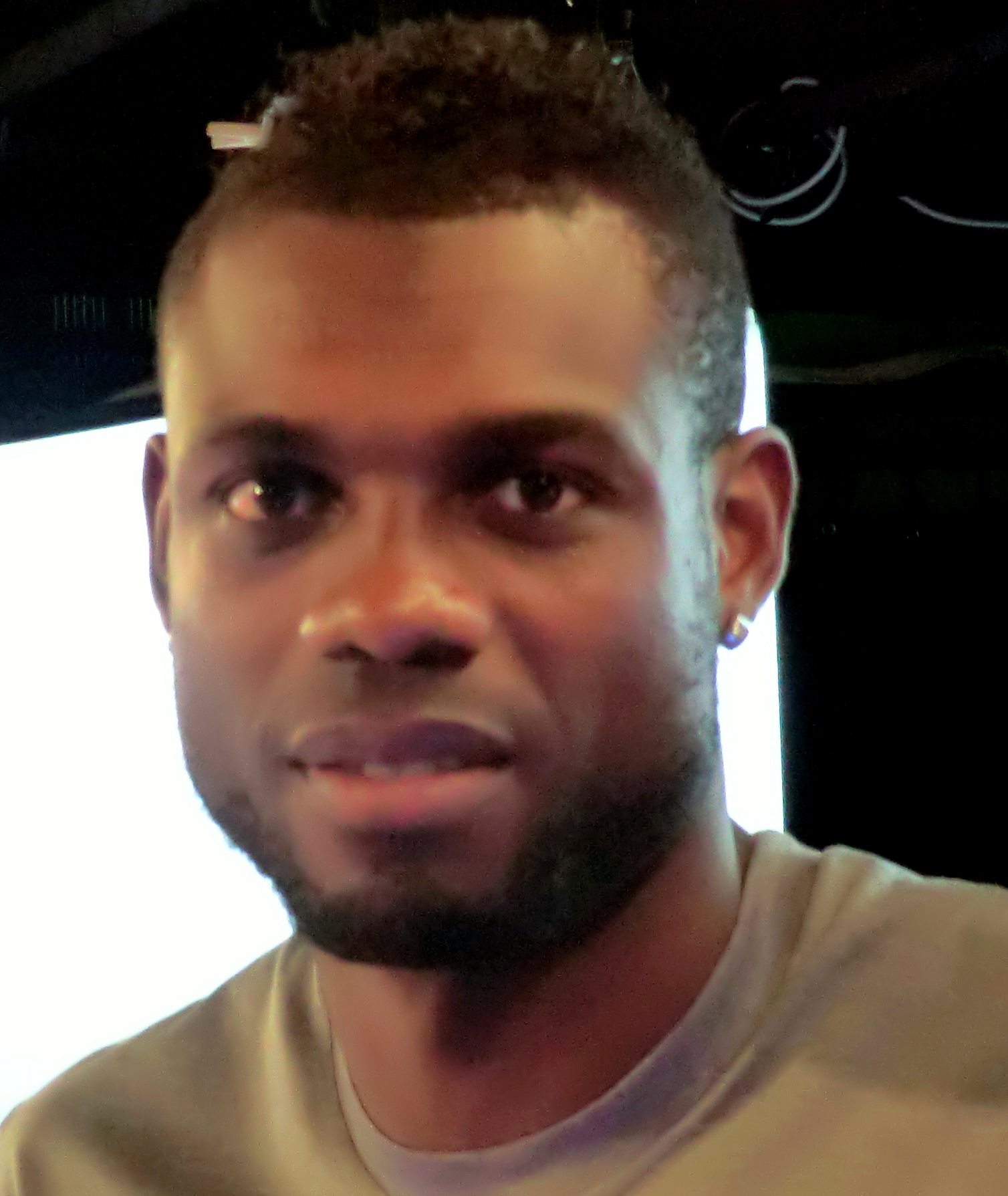
- Bedimo in 2013

Personal information
- Date of birth: 4 June 1984 (age 42)
- Place of birth: Douala, Cameroon
- Height: 1.80 m (5 ft 11 in)
- Position: Left-back

Senior career*
Years	Team	Apps	(Gls)
2002–2003	Grenoble	0	(0)
2003–2006	Toulouse	24	(0)
2006–2007	Le Havre	23	(0)
2007–2010	Châteauroux	75	(4)
2010–2011	Lens	50	(1)
2011–2013	Montpellier	78	(2)
2013–2016	Lyon	124	(3)
2016–2018	Marseille	34	(1)
Total		381	(11)

International career
2009–2016	Cameroon	51	(1)

Managerial career
- 2020–2021: Montpellier (youth)
- 2021: Montpellier B (assistant)
- * Club domestic league appearances and goals

Henri Bedimo Nsamé (born 4 June 1984) is a Cameroonian former professional footballer who played as a left-back. He represented the Cameroon national team internationally from 2009 to 2016 making 51 appearances and scoring once.

== Club career ==
=== Toulouse ===
Born in Douala, Cameroon, Bedimo was trained at the Kadji Sports Academy and Dream FC team in Cameroon and after playing six matches, he was scouted by an agent. This led Bedimo emigrated to France when he was 15 in 1999. Upon arriving at France, Bedimo went on a trial at Grenoble Foot 38 and a successful trial led him to join the club, which saw him assigned to the academy.

After spending three years at the academy and reserve at Grenoble, Bedimo joined Toulouse on a free transfer in 2003. It came after when Erick Mombaerts scouted him during his performance at Gambardella cup match. When he first joined the club, Bedimo started out at the reserve team for the rest of the 2003–04 season.

In June 2004, he signed his first professional contract with Toulouse and was promoted to the first team as a result.

In the opening game of the 2004–05 season, Bedimo made his debut for the club, coming on as an 88th-minute substitute, in a 0–0 draw against Lens. Two weeks later on 21 August 2004, he made his first starts, starting the whole game, in a 2–1 win over Paris Saint-Germain. Since the start of the 2004–05 season, Bedimo found his playing time, mostly coming from the substitute bench in the first team for Toulouse. As a result, he either faced being on the sidelines or playing for Toulouse's reserve team. At the end of the 2004–05 season, Bedimo went on to make eighteen appearances in all competitions.

At the start of the 2005–06 season, Bedimo appeared in the first two matches of the season, including his first start of the season against Nice. However, his first team opportunities at Toulouse continued to be limited throughout the 2005–06 season. Once again, it resulted in him playing for the club's reserve side. At the end of the 2005–06 season, he only made eight appearances in all competitions.

=== Le Havre AC ===
With his first-team opportunities limited at Toulouse further, Bedimo decided to leave the club by joining Le Havre on a free transfer in 2006.

He made his debut for Le Havre in the opening game of the season, starting the whole game, in a 3–1 loss against Amiens. Since making his debut for the club, Bedimo established himself in the starting eleven at Le Havre, playing in the defender position. However, he received a straight red card for the first time in his career, in a 1–0 win over Istres on 13 October 2006. Bedimo then helped Le Havre keep five out the six consecutive clean sheets between 1 December 2006 and 2 February 2007. In what turned out to be his last appearance for the club, he scored an own goal, which turned out to be a winning goal, in a 2–1 loss against Montpellier on 14 May 2007. At the end of the 2006–07 season, he made twenty–four appearances in all competitions.

=== LB Châteauroux ===
After the 2007–08 season, Bedimo left Le Havre for Châteauroux on a free transfer on 22 July 2007.

He made his debut for the club, starting the whole game, minutes, in a 0–0 draw against Clermont Foot in the opening game of the season. Since making his debut for Châteauroux, Bedimo quickly established himself in the starting eleven. On 21 September 2007, Bedimo scored his first goal for the club in a 1–0 win over Chamois Niortais. His second goal for Châteauroux came on 30 March 2008, in a 2–1 loss against Sedan. At the end of the 2007–08 season, he went on to make thirty–six appearances and scoring two times in all competitions.

Ahead of the 2008–09 season, Bedimo was linked a move back to his former club Grenoble, but Châteauroux managed to keep him for another season. On 3 October 2008, he scored his first goal of the season in a 2–1 loss against Boulogne. Two weeks later on 17 October 2008 against Dijon, however, Bedimo was sent–off for a second bookable offence, in a 2–0 loss. Despite this, Bedimo remained involved in a number of matches in the first team and went on to make twenty–three appearances and scoring once in all competitions.

In the 2009–10 season, Bedimo continued to establish himself in the starting eleven for Châteauroux. On 30 October 2009, he scored in a 5–4 loss against Dijon. Bedimo started in every match until his departure from the club, making twenty–three appearances and scoring once in all competitions.

=== RC Lens ===
On 11 January 2010, his transfer from Châteauroux to Lens was finalised after being persuaded by his agent, Roger Boli, to join the club. The move was confirmed on 13 January 2010 as he signed a three–year contract with Lens. After returning from the African Cup of Nations tournament, Bedimo was given a number six shirt.

Bedimo made his debut for the club on 6 February 2010, in a 2–1 win over Le Mans, where he took advantage of injured Marco Ramos and led to the opening goal for Kévin Monnet-Paquet. Two weeks after his debut on 20 February 2010, he scored his first goal for Lens in a 3–0 win over Monaco. Bedimo then established himself in the first team, rotating in the left–back position and left–midfield position for the rest of the 2009–10 season. Since joining the club, Bedimo became a fan favourite for RC Lens. At the end of the 2009–10 season, he went on to make twenty–two appearances and scoring once in all competitions.

In the 2010–11 season, Bedimo quickly established himself in the starting eleven for RC Lens, playing in the left–back position. On two occasions, he played in the left–midfield position for the club. Bedimo then set up the club's second goal of the game, in a 2–2 draw against Monaco on 21 August 2010. Three weeks later on 11 September 2010, he, once again, set up Lens’ only goal of the game, as the club lost 4–1 against rivals, Lille. However, the club was relegated to Ligue 2 after two seasons following a 1–1 draw with Monaco on 15 May 2011. Despite facing injuries that threatened him on the sidelines during the 2010–11 season, Bedimo made thirty–seven appearances in all competitions.

=== Montpellier ===
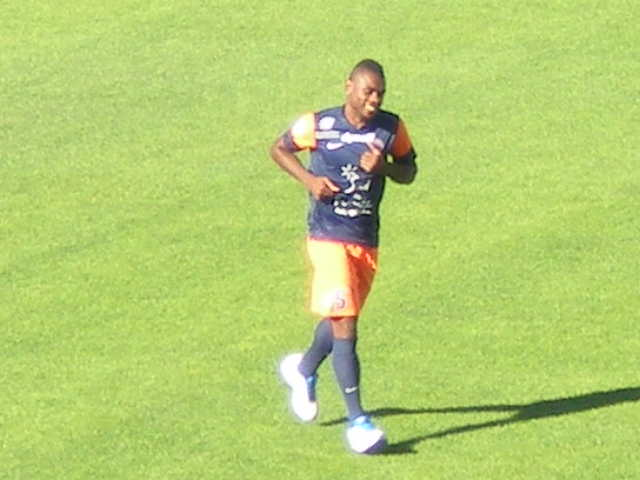
Bedimo training for Montpellier in 2012.

It was announced on 7 June 2011 that Bedimo joined Montpellier, signing a four–year contract with the club. He was previously linked with a move to Rennes but opted to join Montpellier instead. Upon joining the club, he was given a number five shirt.

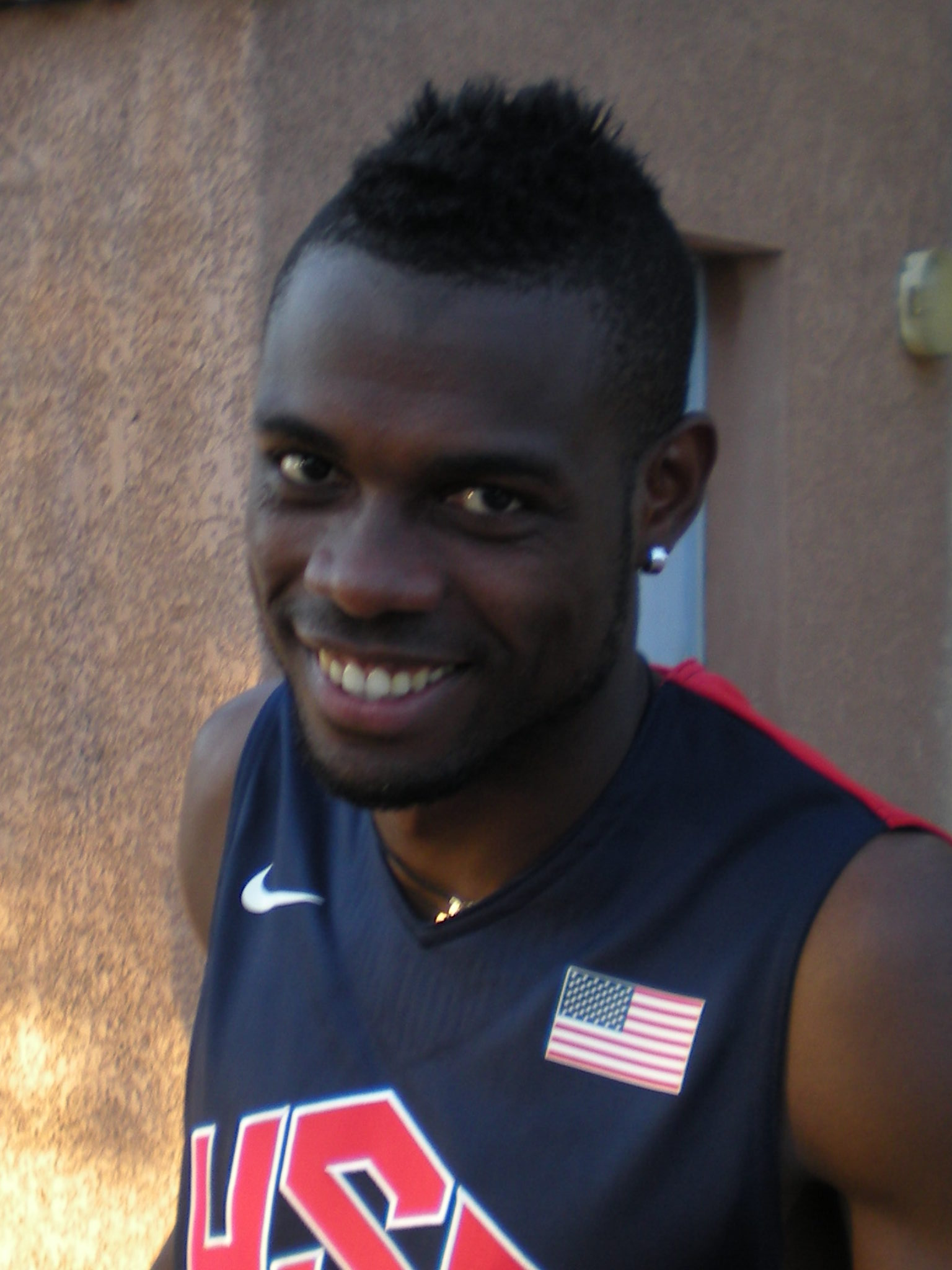
Bedimo pictured during his time at Montpellier in 2012.

Bedimo made his debut for Montpellier, starting the whole game, in a 3–1 win over Auxerre in the opening game of the season. This was followed up by keeping the next two clean sheets against Lille and Stade Rennais. In another follow–up, he scored his first goal in a 2–1 loss against Lyon on 27 August 2011. Three weeks later on 17 September 2011, Bedimo set up a goal for Olivier Giroud, who scored twice, in a 2–2 draw against Brest. Since joining the club, he quickly established himself in the starting eleven, playing in the left-back position. His performance then earned November's Player of the Month by the club's supporters. In the first half of the season, after which they lay second in the table, three points behind big-spending Paris Saint-Germain, who reportedly paid €6 million more for one player than Montpellier's entire €36m budget. Throughout January and mid–February, Bedimo was involved in Montpellier's run of four wins in January and February without conceding a goal took them top, at least until PSG played their game in hand. After missing one match suspension in the last game of the season, Bedimo's contributions helped Montpellier win their first league title in the club's history after beating Auxerre 2–1 in the last game of the season. At the end of the 2011–12 season, having made forty–one appearances and scoring once in all competitions, he was named Trophées UNFP du football's Team of the Year of 2012.

At the start of the 2012–13 season, Bedimo started in the first six matches in the left–back position, as Montpellier made a bad start to the season, losing three times. He was also in the starting eleven for Montpellier's debut in Champions League football, a 2–1 loss at home to Arsenal in the group stage, However, Bedimo was sidelined for three weeks, due to a combination of injury and suspension. On 20 October 2012, he returned to the starting line–up, as the club lost 2–1 against Stade Rennais. Since returning from the sidelines, he started in the next six matches for Montpellier before being dropped to the substitute bench in favour of Abdelhamid El Kaoutari. By mid–December, Bedimo managed to regain his place in the left–back position for the rest of the 2012–13 season. He then helped the club keep three consecutive clean sheets between 16 February 2013 and 1 March 2013. Despite missing one match through suspension later in the season, he went on to make forty–two appearances in all competitions, as the 2012–13 season saw the club unsuccessfully defended the league title.

=== Lyon ===
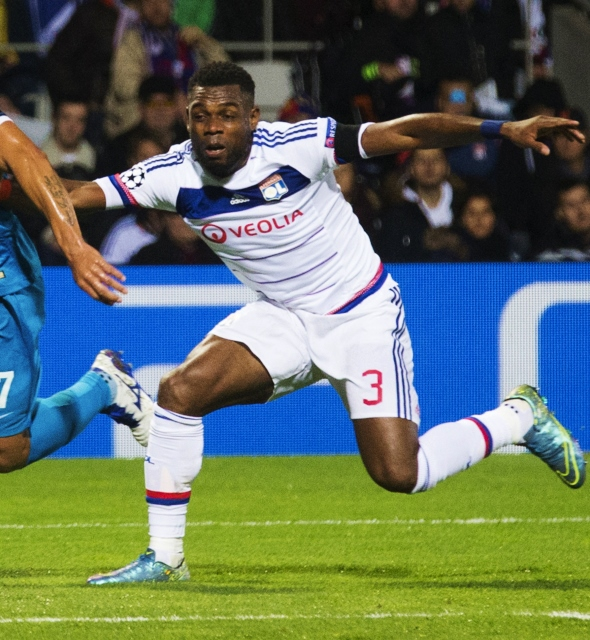
Bedimo pictured playing for Lyon in 2015.

On 1 August 2013, Bedimo joined fellow French team Lyon for a fee of €2 million plus bonuses on a three-year deal. Upon joining the club, he was given a number three shirt.

Bedimo made his Lyon debut in the opening game of the season against Nice, where he started the whole game and helped the side keep a clean sheet, in a 4–0 win. He then played in both legs of the UEFA Champions League Play–Off Round against Real Sociedad, as the club lost 4–0 on aggregate, eliminating them from the tournament. Into the first three months to the 2013–14 season, Bedimo became a first team regular for the side, playing in the left–back position. This lasted until he was sidelined, due to injury and suspension. Afterwards, Bedimo returned to the starting line–up against Monaco on 27 October 2013 and set up Lyon's only goal of the game, losing 2–1. Since returning to the first team, he continued to regain his first team place, mostly playing in the left–back position and once in the left–midfield position. His performance in November earned him the club's Player of the Month. Bedimo then set up two goals in two matches between 8 December 2013 and 15 December 2013 against SC Bastia and Marseille. He then helped Lyon keep three consecutive clean sheets in the league between 11 January 2014 and 26 January 2014 against Sochaux, Reims and Évian. Bedimo, once again, helped the club keep another three consecutive clean sheets between 23 February 2014 and 2 March 2014 against Lille, Chornomorets Odesa and Montpellier. This was followed up by scoring his first goal for Lyon, in a 2–1 win against Bordeaux. However, he suffered ankle injury that kept him out for a week. Following his return, Bedimo then continued to provide assists, which was ten, a target he successfully achieved by the end of the season. Bedimo also started in the Coupe de la Ligue Final against Paris Saint-Germain, playing in the left–back position, as the club lost 2–1. In the last game of the season against Nice, he helped Lyon qualify for European football by finishing fifth place in the league after beating the opposition team 1–0. At the end of the 2013–14 season, Bedimo made fifty–one appearances and scoring once in all competitions. Following this, Le Figaro praised his performance and was included for the newspaper's Team of the Season.

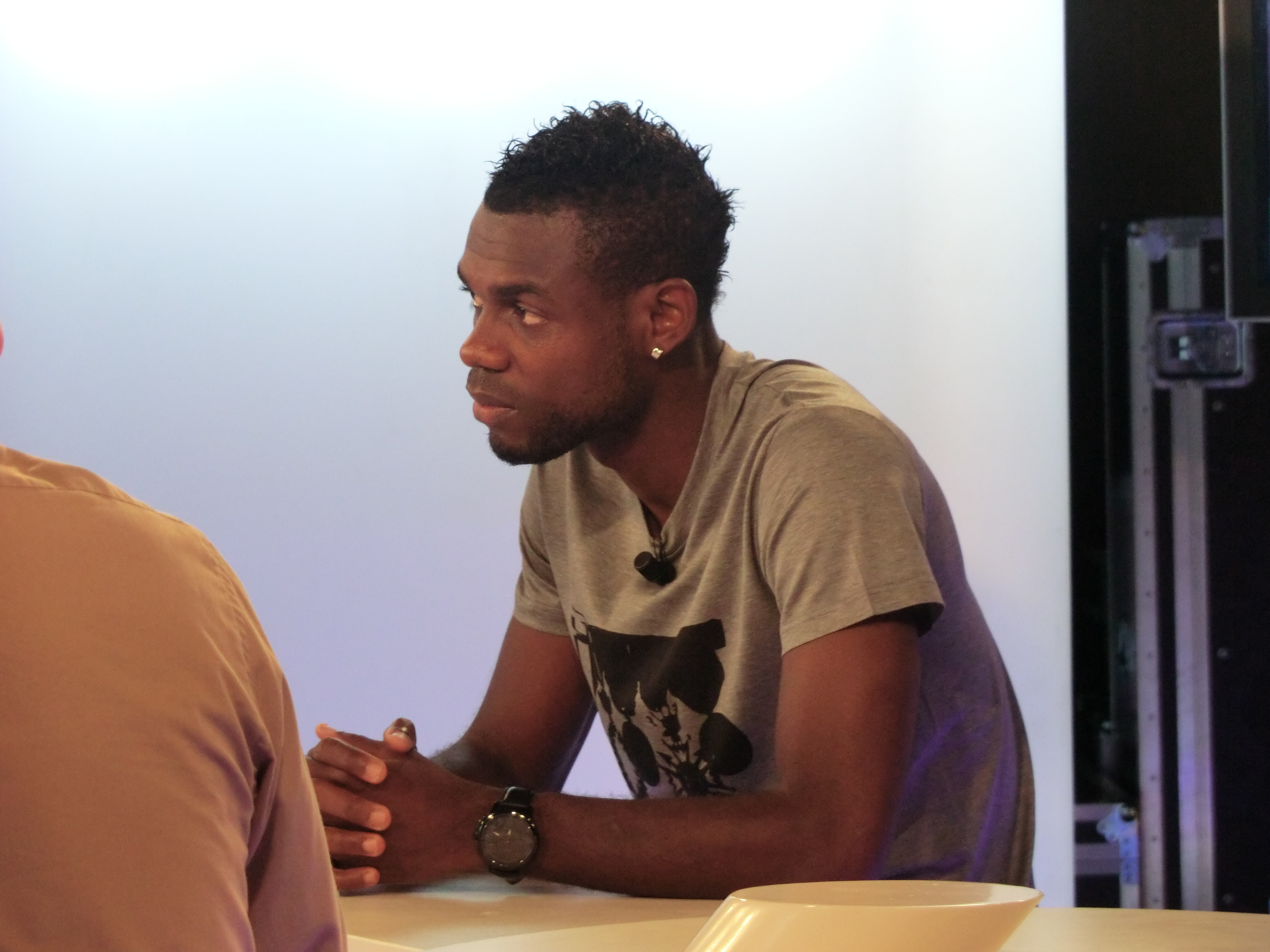
Bedimo pictured during his time at Lyon in 2013.

At the start of the 2014–15 season, Bedimo played in both legs of the UEFA Europa League Third Round against Mladá Boleslav, as Lyon won 4–2 on aggregate. However, during the match against Mladá Boleslav, he suffered a hamstring injury that kept him out for weeks. On 21 September 2014, Bedimo returned to the starting line–up, coming on as a 76th-minute substitute, in a 1–1 draw against Paris Saint-Germain. Since returning from injury, he continued to regain his first team place, playing in the left–back position for the club. However, he spent almost two months away from the first team, due to international commitment and his own injury concern. On 8 February 2015, Bedimo returned to the starting line–up against Paris Saint-Germain, as he helped Lyon draw 1–1. Since returning to the first team, Bedimo continued to regain his first team place, playing in the left–back position for the rest of the 2014–15 season. At the end of the 2014–15 season, he made thirty appearances in all competitions.

At the start of the 2015–16 season, Bedimo started in the left–back position for the Trophée des Champions against Paris Saint-Germain, as Lyon lost 2–0. He then made three starts out of the club's first six matches of the 2015–16 season. However, during a 1–1 draw against Marseille on 19 September 2015, Bedimo suffered a hamstring injury that saw him substituted in the 19th minute and was sidelined for a month. On 30 October 2015, he returned to the first team, coming on in the 60th minute in a 1–0 win against Troyes AC. Since returning to the first team, Bedimo found himself placed on the substitute bench, with Morel preferred as the club's first choice left–back. In addition, he also faced his own injury concern throughout the 2015–16 season. Despite this, Bedimo, at times, appear in the starting line–up whenever Morel plays in the centre–back position. At the end of the 2015–16 season, he made twenty–two appearances in all competitions. Following this, manager Bruno Génésio announced that Bedimo would be leaving Lyon when his contract ran out at the end of the 2015–2016 season.

=== Olympique de Marseille ===
It was announced on 23 June 2016 that Bedimo signed for rival team, Marseille on a three–year contract. He was linked with a move from clubs around Europe before deciding to join Marseille.

Bedimo made his Olympique de Marseille debut, coming on as a 72nd-minute substitute, in a 0–0 draw against Toulouse in the opening game of the season. After being sidelined for a month, he returned to the starting line–up and helped the club draw 0–0 against Lyon on 18 September 2016. Bedimo then started in the left–back position for the next seven matches. Along the way, he helped Lyon keep three consecutive clean sheets between 16 October 2016 and 30 October 2016. However, Bedimo suffered a knee injury while on international duty and was sidelined for months. By February, he returned to full training and returned to the first team on 26 February 2017 against Paris Saint-Germain, coming on a second-half substitute, in a 5–1 win. This was followed up by making five starts in the next five matches. However, Bedimo found himself placed on the substitute bench, with Patrice Evra preferred. Despite this, he went on to make eighteen appearances in all competitions. Following this, Le Figaro named Bedimo a flop, saying, he "is no longer as dashing as during his years in Montpellier."

Ahead of the 2017–18 season, Marseille wanted to sell Bedimo to cut cost, but he ended up staying at the club. At the start of the 2017–18 season, however, Bedimo was dropped from the squad by Manager Rudi Garcia. He also found his first team opportunities limited, as Jordan Amavi took over the left–back position. However, Bedimo also faced his own injury concern and demoted to Marseille's B Team. On 13 January 2018, he returned to the first team, coming on as an 85th-minute substitute, in a 3–0 win against Stade Rennais. Bedimo then made his first start of the season, starting the whole game, in a 2–0 win against SAS Épinal in the second round of the Coupe de France. Following this, he found his first team opportunities hard to come by for the rest of the 2017–18 season. At the end of the 2017–18 season, Bedimo made five appearances in all competitions.

Ahead of the 2018–19 season, Bedimo's future at Marseille became uncertain after being told by Garcia that he has no future at the club. Bedimo later departed Marseille on a bad terms, having been subjected of a dismissal procedure by the OM. Two years after without a club, Bedimo announced his retirement from professional football.

In July 2019, Bedimo filed a lawsuit against Marseille for a wrongful termination and was seeking 5 million euros in damages. However, the case was dismissed by the judge two years later. Following this, he appealed against the decision. However, on 19 June 2023, Bedimo lost the lawsuit against his Marseille.

== International career ==
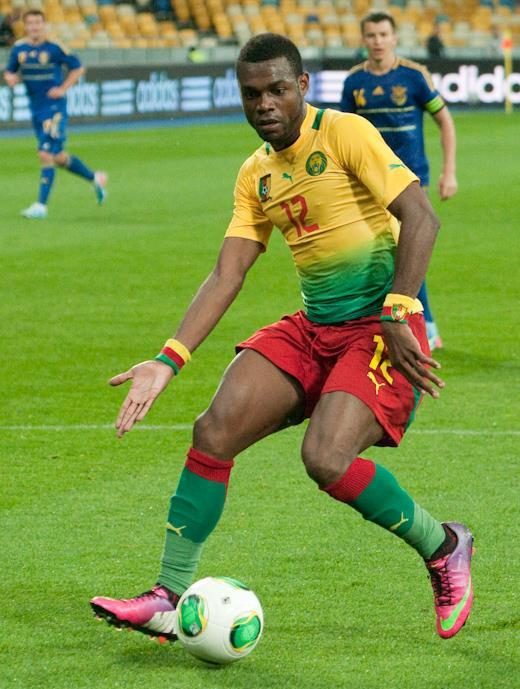
Bedimo playing for Cameroon in 2013.

In September 2009, Bedimo was called up to the Cameroon national team squad for the first time by the national coach Paul Le Guen. He made his debut for the national team, starting the whole game, in a 3–0 win against Togo on 10 October 2009.

Bedimo was then selected for the 2010 African Cup of Nations by Cameroon National coach Paul Le Guen. He made his tournament debut, starting a match and played 75 minutes before being substituted, in a 1–0 loss against Gabon on 13 January 2010. Bedimo later played two more times in the African Cup of Nations, as they were eliminated by Egypt in the quarter–finals.

After being dropped from the squad for the FIFA World Cup, Bedimo didn't make an appearance until on 11 August 2010 when he played in the left–back position, and played 82 minutes, in a 3–0 win against Poland. The next three years saw Bedimo establish himself in the starting eleven, playing in the left–back position for the national side. Bedimo then helped Cameroon keep three consecutive clean sheets in three matches between 2 June 2013 and 16 June 2013.

Despite not being involved in the squad for Cameroon, Bedimo's contributions saw the national side qualify for the 2014 FIFA World Cup. It was announced on 2 June 2014 that he was included in Cameroon's squad for the World Cup. Having appeared as an unused substitute in the first two matches in the group stage and witnessing the national side elimination, Bedimo made his first appearance of the tournament, starting the whole game, in a 4–1 loss against Brazil.

Following the end of the World Cup tournament, he then helped Cameroon keep four consecutive clean sheets that saw the national side qualify for the 2015 Africa Cup of Nations. In January 2015, Bedimo was called up into the squad by the national team for the African Cup of Nations. He started all three matches in the tournament, as Cameroon were eliminated from the group stage. Following this, L'Équipe named Bedimo the best left–back player in the tournament despite playing only three matches.

On 9 June 2015, he scored his first goal for the national side, in a 1–1 draw against DR Congo. Bedimo played in both legs in the World Cup qualification Round against Niger, as Cameroon won 3–0 on aggregate to advance to the next round. He then helped the national side qualify for the 2017 Africa Cup of Nations after beating Mauritania on 3 June 2016. Following this, Bedimo was sidelined for the rest of the Cameroon's career and was even dropped from the squad for the tournament.

== Coaching career ==
After retiring in June 2020, Bedimo opened up his football academy in his country. Two years later, Bedimo joined the youth academy of Montpellier and split his time in Cameroon to operate his football academy. In July 2021, he was promoted to assistant coach of the club's reserve team.

In November 2021, Bedimo also began to take up a coaching badge in hopes of becoming a coach in the future. In May 2022, he graduated from the French Football Federation with a coaching badge.

== Career statistics ==
=== International goals ===
Scores and results list Cameroon's goal tally first.

Goal	Date	Venue	Opponent	Score	Result	Competition
1.	9 June 2015	Stade Charles Tondreau, Mons, Belgium	DR Congo	1–1	1–1	Friendly

== Personal life ==
Growing up, Bedimo supported Paris Saint-Germain and idolised Rivaldo. He is an avid video gamer. Growing up, Bedimo revealed in an interview with Maxi Foot that his parents forbade him from playing football and did so, though "We used to beat each other up a lot."

Bedimo acquired French nationality by naturalization on 21 January 2008. He is married and has a daughter.

Bedimo opened up his Facebook account for the first time in August 2011.

== Honours ==
=== Club ===
Montpellier

- Ligue 1: 2011–12
- UNFP Ligue 1 Team of the Year: 2011–12
