= Arnold Mvuemba =

Congolese-French professional footballer (born 1985)

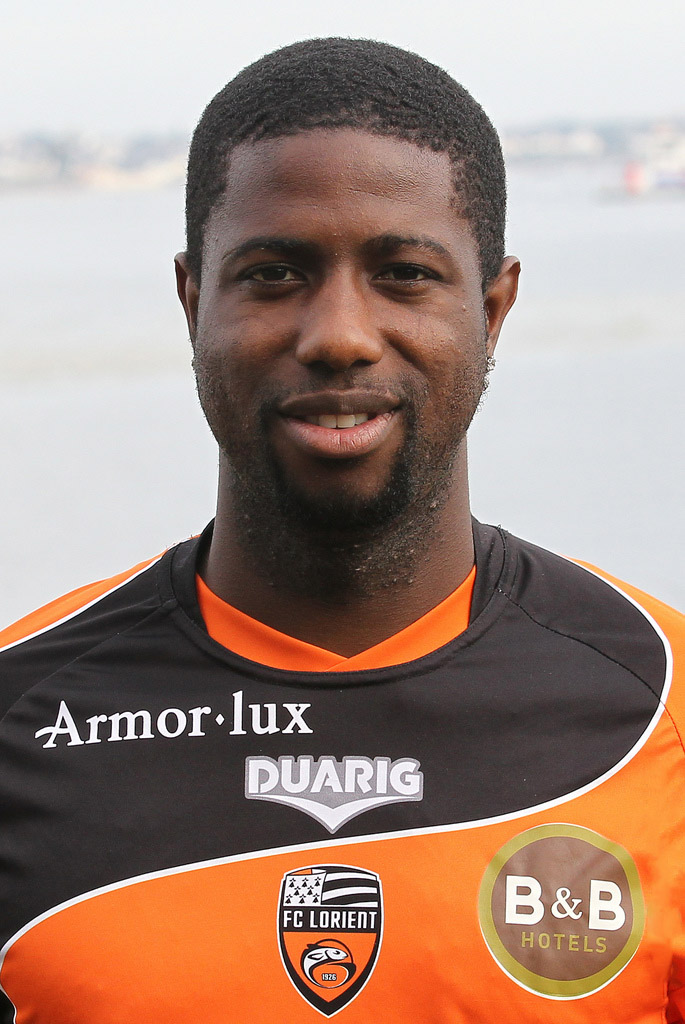
- Mvuemba with Lorient in 2010

Personal information
- Full name: Arnold Mvuemba Makengo
- Date of birth: 28 January 1985 (age 41)
- Place of birth: Alençon, Orne, France
- Height: 1.72 m (5 ft 8 in)
- Position: Midfielder

Youth career
- 1998–2003: Rennes

Senior career*
Years	Team	Apps	(Gls)
2003–2007	Rennes	33	(1)
2007	→ Portsmouth (loan)	7	(1)
2007–2009	Portsmouth	14	(0)
2009–2012	Lorient	109	(9)
2012–2016	Lyon	55	(2)
2014	Lyon B	2	(0)
2016–2018	Lorient	33	(1)
2018–2019	Umm Salal	7	(0)
2019	Roeselare	12	(0)
Total		272	(14)

International career
2005	France U21	4	(0)
2005	DR Congo	1	(0)
- * Club domestic league appearances and goals

Arnold Mvuemba Makengo (born 28 January 1985) is a former Congolese-French professional footballer who played as a midfielder.

== Club career ==
Mvuemba was born in Alençon, Orne, France. He was signed by Premier League team Portsmouth on loan from Stade Rennais in January 2007 until May 2007, with an option to complete a permanent deal. He made his debut against Blackburn Rovers on 25 February 2007, and scored his first Premier League goal on 9 April 2007 in a 4–2 defeat to Watford. On 3 July, Mvuemba signed a three-year contract with Portsmouth for an undisclosed fee. Mvuemba was part of Portsmouth's 2007–08 FA Cup-winning team. Despite not making the squad for the final he appeared in the earlier rounds. He scored against VfL Wolfsburg in the UEFA Cup but it was not enough to enable Portsmouth to remain in the competition. On 7 August 2009, Mvuemba signed a contract with FC Lorient after being released by Portsmouth.

He was signed by Lyon in summer 2012 for €3 million and €1 million variable. Mvuemba was released by Lyon at the end of the 2015–16 season.

== International career ==
Mvuemba made one appearance for the DR Congo national team in 2005.

== Style of play ==
Mvuemba plays in central midfield normally as a playmaker in an attacking role. He came to prominence playing in this position alongside holding midfielder Lassana Diarra in the Toulon Tournament (U20) in June 2005.

According to Liverpool and England striker Peter Crouch, who was his teammate in Portsmouth, Mvuemba was the most talented player in the squad at the time but could not perform at his best due to nerves. Crouch wrote that Mvuemba was a "genius midfield playmaker who could turn invisible at the sound of a referee's whistle".
