= 2019–20 Olympique Lyonnais season =

Lyon
2019–20 season
- Owner: OL Groupe
- Chairman: Jean-Michel Aulas
- Manager: Sylvinho (until 7 October); Rudi Garcia (from 14 October)
- Stadium: Parc Olympique Lyonnais
- Ligue 1: 7th
- Coupe de France: Semi-finals
- Coupe de la Ligue: Runners-up
- UEFA Champions League: Semi-finals
- Top goalscorer: League: Moussa Dembélé (16); All: Moussa Dembélé (24)
Home colours	Away colours	Third colours

The 2019–20 season was Olympique Lyonnais's 70th professional season since its establishment in 1950 and the club's 31st consecutive season in the top flight of French football. In addition to the domestic league, Lyon participated in this season's edition of the Coupe de France, Coupe de la Ligue and the UEFA Champions League.

In May 2019, Sylvinho was announced as the new manager of the club. He was sacked on 7 October due to poor results and was replaced by Rudi Garcia seven days later.

== Players ==
=== Squad information ===
Players and squad numbers last updated on 30 January 2019. Appearances include league matches only.
Note: Flags indicate national team as has been defined under FIFA eligibility rules. Players may hold more than one non-FIFA nationality.

No.	Name	Nat	Position(s)	Date of birth (age)	Signed in	Contract ends	Signed from	Apps.	Goals
1	Anthony Lopes	(Portugal)	GK	1 October 1990 (age 36)	2011	2020	(France) Youth Sector	218	0
2	Mapou Yanga-Mbiwa	(France)	CB	15 May 1989 (age 37)	2015	2020	(Italy) Roma	57	2
3	Joachim Andersen	(Denmark)	CB	31 May 1996 (age 30)	2019	2024	(Italy) Sampdoria	24	2
4	Rafael	(Brazil)	RB	9 July 1990 (age 36)	2015	2021	(England) Manchester United	90	1
5	Jason Denayer	(Belgium)	CB	28 June 1995 (age 31)	2018	2022	(England) Manchester City	31	2
6	Marcelo	(Brazil)	CB	20 May 1987 (age 39)	2017	2021	(Turkey) Beşiktaş	68	3
7	Martin Terrier	(France)	LW	4 March 1997 (age 29)	2018	2022	(France) Lille	32	9
8	Houssem Aouar	(France)	CM	30 June 1998 (age 28)	2016	2023	(France) Youth Sector	72	13
9	Moussa Dembélé	(France)	CF	12 July 1996 (age 30)	2018	2023	(Scotland) Celtic	33	15
10	Bertrand Traoré	(Burkina Faso)	RW / CF	6 September 1995 (age 31)	2017	2022	(England) Chelsea	65	20
11	Memphis Depay	(Netherlands)	LW / CF	13 February 1994 (age 32)	2017	2021	(England) Manchester United	89	34
12	Thiago Mendes	(Brazil)	DM	15 March 1992 (age 34)	2019	2023	(France) Lille	27	0
14	Léo Dubois	(France)	RB / LB	14 September 1994 (age 32)	2018	2022	(France) Nantes	25	1
16	Anthony Racioppi	(Switzerland)	GK	31 December 1998 (age 27)	2018	2021	(France) Youth Sector	0	0
17	Jeff Reine-Adélaïde	(France)	CM	17 January 1998 (age 28)	2019	2024	(France) Angers	19	2
18	Rayan Cherki	(France)	CF	17 August 2003 (age 23)	2019	2022	(France) Youth Sector	4	0
19	Amine Gouiri	(France)	CF	16 February 2000 (age 26)	2017	2022	(France) Youth Sector	7	0
20	Marçal	(Brazil)	LB	19 February 1989 (age 37)	2017	2021	(Portugal) Benfica	30	0
21	Karl Toko Ekambi	(Cameroon)	CF	14 September 1992 (age 34)	2020	2020	(Spain) Villarreal	2	2
22	Jean Lucas	(Brazil)	CM	22 June 1998 (age 28)	2019	2024	(Brazil) Flamengo	14	3
23	Kenny Tete	(Netherlands)	RB	9 October 1995 (age 31)	2017	2021	(Netherlands) Ajax	35	1
25	Maxence Caqueret	(France)	CM	15 February 2000 (age 26)	2019	2023	(France) Youth Sector	6	0
26	Oumar Solet	(France)	CB	7 February 2000 (age 26)	2018	2022	(France) Stade Laval	1	0
27	Maxwel Cornet	(Ivory Coast)	RW / LW / CF	27 September 1996 (age 30)	2015	2021	(France) Metz	125	25
28	Youssouf Koné	(Mali)	LB	5 July 1995 (age 31)	2019	2024	(France) Lille	3	0
29	Lucas Tousart	(France)	DM	29 April 1997 (age 29)	2015	2023	(France) Valenciennes	90	1
30	Ciprian Tătărușanu	(Romania)	GK	6 February 1986 (age 40)	2019	2022	(France) Nantes	0	0
39	Bruno Guimarães	(Brazil)	DM	16 November 1996 (age 29)	2020	2024	(Brazil) Athletico Paranaense	0	0
	Camilo	(Brazil)	AM	23 February 1999 (age 27)	2020		(Brazil) Ponte Preta	0	0

== Transfers ==
=== In ===
Date	Pos.	Player	Age	Moving from	Fee	Notes	Source
1 July 2019	MF	(Brazil) Jean Lucas	21	(Brazil) Flamengo	€8M	Five-year contract	
1 July 2019	GK	(Romania) Ciprian Tătărușanu	33	(France) Nantes	Free	Three-year contract	
1 July 2019	MF	(France) Boubacar Fofana	20	(France) Gazélec Ajaccio	Free	Four-year contract	
3 July 2019	DF	(Mali) Youssouf Koné	23	(France) Lille	€9M		
3 July 2019	MF	(Brazil) Thiago Mendes	27	(France) Lille	€25M		
12 July 2019	DF	(Denmark) Joachim Andersen	23	(Italy) Sampdoria	€30M		
14 August 2019	MF	(France) Jeff Reine-Adélaïde	21	(France) Angers	€25M + €2.5M incentives	Five-year contract	
22 January 2020	FW	(Zimbabwe) Tino Kadewere	24	(France) Le Havre	€12M + €3M incentives	Four-year-and-a half contract	
29 January 2020	MF	(Brazil) Bruno Guimarães	22	(Brazil) Athletico Paranaense	€20M	Six-year contract	

=== Out ===
Date	Pos.	Player	Age	Moving to	Fee	Notes	Source
13 June 2019	MF	(Luxembourg) Christopher Martins	22	(Switzerland) Young Boys	€2M		
19 June 2019	DF	(France) Ferland Mendy	24	(Spain) Real Madrid	€48M		
20 June 2019	MF	(France) Jordan Ferri	27	(France) Montpellier	€2M		
2 July 2019	MF	(France) Tanguy Ndombele	22	(England) Tottenham Hotspur	€62M	Six-year contract	
16 July 2019	MF	(France) Hamza Rafia	20	(Italy) Juventus	€0.4M		
17 July 2019	DF	(Madagascar) Jérémy Morel	35	(France) Rennes	Undisclosed	One-year contract	
22 July 2019	MF	(France) Nabil Fekir	26	(Spain) Real Betis	€19.75M + €10M variables	Lyon receive 20% of future transfer	
22 July 2019	FW	(France) Yassin Fekir	22	(Spain) Real Betis		Lyon receive 50% of future transfer	
27 January 2020	MF	(France) Lucas Tousart	22	(Germany) Hertha BSC	€25M	Loaned back to Lyon for remainder of season	

=== Loans in ===
Date	Pos.	Player	Age	Moving from	Fee	Notes	Source
20 January 2020	FW	(Cameroon) Karl Toko Ekambi	27	(Spain) Villarreal	€4M	Loan with €11.5M option to buy	
28 January 2020	MF	(France) Lucas Tousart	21	(Germany) Hertha BSC	N/A		

=== Loans out ===
Date	Pos.	Player	Age	Moving to	Fee	Notes	Source
13 August 2019	FW	(France) Lenny Pintor	19	(France) Troyes	N/A		
14 August 2019	MF	(Spain) Pape Cheikh Diop	22	(Spain) Celta Vigo	€0.5M	Loan with €9M option to buy	
23 January 2020	FW	(Zimbabwe) Tino Kadewere	24	(France) Le Havre	N/A		

=== Transfer summary ===
Spending

Summer: ▼€97,000,000

Winter: ▼€36,000,000

Total: ▼€133,000,000

Income

Summer: ▲€134,450,000

Winter: ▲€25,000,000

Total: ▲€159,450,000

Net Expenditure

Summer: ▲€37,450,000

Winter: ▼€11,000,000

Total: ▲€26,450,000

== Friendlies ==
Win Draw Loss

13 July 2019 Friendly	Lyon (France)	1–2	(Switzerland) Servette	Bourgoin-Jallieu, France
16:30 CEST (UTC+2)	Terrier 78'	Report	Koné 2'; Tasar 33'	Stadium: Stade Pierre Rajon

20 July 2019 Friendly	Lyon (France)	3–4	(Italy) Genoa	Gueugnon, France
19:00 CEST (UTC+2)	Mendes 11'; Yanga-Mbiwa 51'; Fofana 61'	Report	Criscito 15' (pen.), (yellow card) 37'; Lerager (yellow card) 44'; Ghiglione 65'; Hiljemark 71'; Kouamé 86'; El Yamiq (yellow card) 89'	Stadium: Stade Jean Laville

28 July 2019 2019 Emirates Cup	Arsenal (England)	1–2	(France) Lyon	London, England
15:15 BST (UTC+1)	Aubameyang 35'	Report	Dembélé 66', 75'	Stadium: Emirates Stadium; Referee: Jonathan Moss (England)

31 July 2019 Friendly	Liverpool (England)	3–1	(France) Lyon	Geneva, Switzerland
19:00 CEST (UTC+2)	Alisson (yellow card) 3'; Firmino 17'; Andersen 21' (o.g.); Hoever (yellow card) 38'; Wilson 53'	Report	Depay 4' (pen.)	Stadium: Stade de Genève; Referee: Stephan Klossner (Switzerland)

3 August 2019 Friendly	Bournemouth (England)	3–0	(France) Lyon	Bournemouth, England
15:30 BST (UTC+1)	C. Wilson 11'; Kilkenny 19'; King 73'	Report		Stadium: Vitality Stadium

1 July 2020 Friendly	Lyon (France)	12–0	(Switzerland) US Port-Valais	Evian, France
19:30 CEST (UTC+2)	Depay 2' (pen.), 18', 49', 73'; Toko Ekambi 7', 89'; Kadewere 15', 22', 27', 32'; Mendes 57'; Caqueret 68'	Report		Stadium: Camille Fournier Stadium; Attendance: 0

4 July 2020 Friendly	Lyon (France)	1–0	(France) Nice	Décines-Charpieu, France
18:30 CEST (UTC+2)	Aouar 5' (pen.); Traoré (yellow card) 40'	Report	Benítez (yellow card) 4'	Stadium: Parc Olympique Lyonnais; Attendance: 0 Referee: Aurélien Petit

16 July 2020 2020 Veolia Cup	Lyon (France)	0–2	(Scotland) Rangers	Décines-Charpieu, France
20:45 CEST (UTC+2)	Marcelo (yellow card) 39'; Depay (yellow card) 75'	Report	Marcelo 20' (o.g.); Hagi 25'; Kent (red card) 39'	Stadium: Parc Olympique Lyonnais; Attendance: 5,000

18 July 2020 2020 Veolia Cup	Lyon (France)	2–1	(Scotland) Celtic	Décines-Charpieu, France
20:45 CEST (UTC+2)	Dembélé 4'; Depay 40'	Report	Soro (yellow card) 37'; Elyounoussi 88'	Stadium: Parc Olympique Lyonnais; Attendance: 5,000

22 July 2020 Friendly	Gent (Belgium)	2–3	(France) Lyon	Ghent, Belgium
19:45 CEST (UTC+2)	Niangbo 34'; Plastun (yellow card) 37'; De Bruyn 74' (pen.)	Report	Toko Ekambi 21'; Traoré 42'; Bard 49'	Stadium: Ghelamco Arena; Attendance: 0

24 July 2020 Friendly	Antwerp (Belgium)	2–3	(France) Lyon	Antwerp, Belgium
16:00 CEST (UTC+2)	Rodrigues (yellow card) 30'; Verstraete (yellow card) 59'; Hongla 70'; Buta 78'	Report	Dembélé 24'; Seck 45' (o.g.); Cornet 49'	Stadium: Bosuilstadion; Attendance: 0

== Competitions ==
=== Overview ===
Competition	First match	Last match	Starting round	Final position	Record							
Competition	First match	Last match	Starting round	Final position	Pld	W	D	L	GF	GA	GD	Win %
Ligue 1	9 August 2019	8 March 2020	Matchday 1	7th	28	11	7	10	42	27	+15	39.29
Coupe de France	4 January 2020	4 March 2020	Round of 64	Semi-finals	5	4	0	1	15	9	+6	80.00
Coupe de la Ligue	18 December 2019	31 July 2020	Round of 16	Runners-up	4	2	2	0	9	4	+5	50.00
Champions League	17 September 2019	19 August 2020	Group stage	Semi-finals	10	4	2	4	14	14	+0	40.00
Total					47	21	11	15	80	54	+26	44.68

Source: Soccerway

=== Ligue 1 ===
==== League table ====
Pos	Team	Pld	W	D	L	GF	GA	GD	Pts	PPG	Qualification or relegation
5	Nice	28	11	8	9	41	38	+3	41 (Note: Nice finished ahead of Reims on head-to-head points: Nice 2–0 Reims, Reims 1–1 Nice.)	1.46	Qualification for the Europa League group stage (Note: Since the winners of the Coupe de France and the Coupe de la Ligue, Paris Saint-Germain, qualified for the Champions League, the spot given to the Coupe de France winners (Europa League group stage) was passed to the fifth-placed team and the spot given to the Coupe de la Ligue winners (Europa League second qualifying round) was passed to the sixth-placed team.)
6	Reims	28	10	11	7	26	21	+5	41	1.46	Qualification for the Europa League second qualifying round
7	Lyon	28	11	7	10	42	27	+15	40	1.43	
8	Montpellier	28	11	7	10	35	34	+1	40	1.43	
9	Monaco	28	11	7	10	44	44	0	40	1.43	

Source: Ligue 1
Rules for classification: 1) Points per game; 2) Head-to-head points; 3) Head-to-head goal difference; 4) Goal difference; 5) Goals scored; 6) Fairplay ranking.

==== Results summary ====
Overall								Home						Away					
Pld	W	D	L	GF	GA	GD	Pts	W	D	L	GF	GA	GD	W	D	L	GF	GA	GD
28	11	7	10	42	27	+15	40	5	4	4	17	7	+10	6	3	6	25	20	+5

Source: Competitive matches

==== Results by round ====
Round	1	2	3	4	5	6	7	8	9	10	11	12	13	14	15	16	17	18	19	20	21	22	23	24	25	26	27	28	29	30	31	32	33	34	35	36	37	38
Ground	A	H	A	H	A	H	A	H	A	H	H	A	A	H	A	H	A	H	A	A	H	A	H	A	H	A	H	A	A	H	A	H	A	H	H	A	H	A
Result	W	W	L	D	D	L	D	L	L	D	W	W	L	W	W	L	W	L	D	W	W	L	D	L	D	W	W	L	C	C	C	C	C	C	C	C	C	C
Position	1	1	3	5	8	9	11	11	14	17	13	10	14	9	7	10	7	8	12	7	5	6	6	9	11	7	5	7	7	7	7	7	7	7	7	7	7	7

Source: Ligue 1
A = Away; H = Home; W = Win; D = Draw; L = Loss; C = Cancelled

==== Matches ====
The Ligue 1 schedule was announced on 14 June 2019. The Ligue 1 matches were suspended by the LFP on 13 March 2020 due to COVID-19 until further notices. On 28 April 2020, it was announced that Ligue 1 and Ligue 2 campaigns would not resume, after the country banned all sporting events until September. On 30 April, The LFP ended officially the 2019–20 season.

9 August 2019 1	Monaco	0–3	Lyon	Monaco
20:45 CEST (UTC+2)	Fàbregas (red card) 30'; Benaglio (yellow card) 33'; Ballo-Touré (yellow card) 54'	Report	Dembélé 5'; Aouar (yellow card) 33'; Depay 36'; Dubois (yellow card) 63'; Tousart 80'	Stadium: Stade Louis II; Attendance: 12,663; Referee: Ruddy Buquet

16 August 2019 2	Lyon	6–0	Angers	Décines-Charpieu
20:45 CEST (UTC+2)	Aouar 11'; Dembélé 36', 65'; Depay 42', 48'; Traoré (yellow card) 61'; Jean Lucas 72'	Report	Capelle (yellow card) 70'; Bahoken (yellow card) 90+3'	Stadium: Parc Olympique Lyonnais; Attendance: 49,871; Referee: Benoît Millot

27 August 2019 3	Montpellier	1–0	Lyon	Montpellier
19:00 CEST (UTC+2)	Souquet 42', (yellow card) 90'; P. Mendes (yellow card) 54'	Report	Andersen (yellow card) 35'; Tousart (yellow card) 49'; Koné (red card) 51'; T. Mendes (yellow card) 56'; Tete (yellow card) 82'	Stadium: Stade de la Mosson; Attendance: 19,387; Referee: Mikael Lesage

31 August 2019 4	Lyon	1–1	Bordeaux	Décines-Charpieu
17:30 CEST (UTC+2)	Reine-Adélaïde (yellow card) 13'; T. Mendes (yellow card) 30' (yellow-red card) 62'; Depay 32'; Andersen (yellow card) 75'	Report	Hwang (yellow card) 15'; Kalu (yellow card) 40'; Briand 67'; Otávio (yellow card) 69'	Stadium: Parc Olympique Lyonnais; Attendance: 52,327; Referee: Antony Gautier

13 September 2019 5	Amiens	2–2	Lyon	Amiens
20:45 CEST (UTC+2)	Diabaté (yellow card) 3'; Jallet 7'; Monconduit (yellow card) 85'; Aleesami (yellow card) 88'; Bodmer 90+2'	Report	Dembélé 9', 34'; Reine-Adélaïde (yellow card) 74'; Tousart (yellow card) 90+3'	Stadium: Stade de la Licorne; Attendance: 12,577; Referee: Benoît Bastien

22 September 2019 6	Lyon	0–1	Paris Saint-Germain	Décines-Charpieu
21:00 CEST (UTC+2)	Koné (yellow card) 76'	Report	Diallo (yellow card) 33'; Neymar 88'	Stadium: Parc Olympique Lyonnais; Attendance: 54,583; Referee: Ruddy Buquet

25 September 2019 7	Brest	2–2	Lyon	Brest
19:00 CEST (UTC+2)	Court 29', 85'	Report	Dembélé 28'; Cornet 70'	Stadium: Stade Francis-Le Blé; Attendance: 14,472; Referee: Amaury Delerue

28 September 2019 8	Lyon	0–1	Nantes	Décines-Charpieu
13:30 CEST (UTC+2)	Marcelo (yellow card) 10'; Dubois (yellow card) 55'	Report	Appiah (yellow card) 13'; Marçal 59' (o.g.); Pallois (yellow card) 64'	Stadium: Parc Olympique Lyonnais; Attendance: 46,647; Referee: Benoît Millot

6 October 2019 9	Saint-Étienne	1–0	Lyon	Saint-Étienne
21:00 CEST (UTC+2)	Youssouf (yellow card) 37'; Berić 90'	Report	Marçal (yellow card) 19'; Jean Lucas (yellow card) 90+6'	Stadium: Stade Geoffroy-Guichard; Attendance: 34,071; Referee: Clément Turpin

19 October 2019 10	Lyon	0–0	Dijon	Décines-Charpieu
17:30 CEST (UTC+2)		Report		Stadium: Parc Olympique Lyonnais; Attendance: 48,454; Referee: Frank Schneider

26 October 2019 11	Lyon	2–0	Metz	Décines-Charpieu
20:00 CEST (UTC+2)	Depay 28'; Dembélé 33' (pen.); Tousart (yellow card) 38'	Report	Fofana (yellow card) 10'; Cabit (yellow card) 32'	Stadium: Parc Olympique Lyonnais; Attendance: 48,889; Referee: Johan Hamel

2 November 2019 12	Toulouse	2–3	Lyon	Toulouse
20:00 CET (UTC+1)	Sanogo 15'; Gonçalves (yellow card) 46'; Lopes 59' (o.g.); Koné (yellow card) 82'; Vainqueur (yellow card) 84'	Report	Depay 26', 90+5'; Dembélé 67'	Stadium: Stadium de Toulouse; Attendance: 16,225; Referee: Karim Abed

10 November 2019 13	Marseille	2–1	Lyon	Marseille
21:00 CET (UTC+1)	Sarr (yellow card) 10'; Payet 18' (pen.), 39'; Álvaro (yellow card) 46' (yellow-red card) 64'; Rongier (yellow card) 83'	Report	Dembélé 59'	Stadium: Stade Vélodrome; Attendance: 65,421; Referee: Antony Gautier

23 November 2019 14	Lyon	2–1	Nice	Décines-Charpieu
17:30 CET (UTC+1)	Reine-Adélaïde 11', (yellow card) 33'; Dembélé 28' (pen.); Marçal (red card) 34'; T. Mendes (yellow card) 90+4'	Report	Dante (yellow card) 56'; Burner (yellow card) 66' (yellow-red card) 86'; Dolberg 78'; Ounas (yellow card) 90+4'	Stadium: Parc Olympique Lyonnais; Attendance: 49,401; Referee: Amaury Delerue

30 November 2019 15	Strasbourg	1–2	Lyon	Strasbourg
17:30 CET (UTC+1)	Fofana 22'; Lala (yellow card) 47'; Ajorque (yellow card) 68'; Da Costa (yellow card) 89'	Report	Cornet 40'; Reine-Adelaide 75'; Dembélé (yellow card) 90+4'	Stadium: Stade de la Meinau; Attendance: 25,455; Referee: Mikael Lesage

3 December 2019 16	Lyon	0–1	Lille	Décines-Charpieu
21:05 CET (UTC+1)	Rafael (yellow card) 79'	Report	Çelik (yellow card) 59'; Ikoné 68'; Sanches (yellow card) 78'	Stadium: Parc Olympique Lyonnais; Attendance: 42,535; Referee: Ruddy Buquet

6 December 2019 17	Nîmes	0–4	Lyon	Nîmes
20:45 CET (UTC+1)	Valls (red card) 5'; Paquiez (yellow card) 38' (yellow-red card) 40'	Report	Depay 16' (pen.), 64'; Caqueret (yellow card) 17'; Traoré (yellow card) 50'; Aouar 71'; Andersen 79'	Stadium: Stade des Costières; Attendance: 12,801; Referee: Olivier Thual

15 December 2019 18	Lyon	0–1	Rennes	Décines-Charpieu
17:00 CET (UTC+1)	Traoré (yellow card) 54'; Andersen (yellow card) 56'; Caqueret (yellow card) 90+1'	Report	Niang (yellow card) 45'; Bourigeaud (yellow card) 76'; Gnagnon (yellow card) 82'; Camavinga 89'	Stadium: Parc Olympique Lyonnais; Attendance: 45,010; Referee: Benoît Bastien

21 December 2019 19	Reims	1–1	Lyon	Reims
20:45 CET (UTC+1)	Disasi (yellow card) 8'; Chavalerin (yellow card) 36'; Cafaro 44' (pen.)	Report	Tousart 9'; Aouar (yellow card) 20'; Marcelo (yellow card) 41'; Jean Lucas (yellow card) 88'	Stadium: Stade Auguste-Delaune; Attendance: 17,257; Referee: Frank Schneider

11 January 2020 20	Bordeaux	1–2	Lyon	Bordeaux
17:30 CET (UTC+1)	Briand 15'; Poussin (yellow card) 89'	Report	Rafael (yellow card) 24'; Traoré (yellow card) 45+2'; Cornet 50'; Dembélé 53'; Lopes (yellow card) 90'	Stadium: Matmut Atlantique; Attendance: 28,737; Referee: Clément Turpin

26 January 2020 21	Lyon	3–0	Toulouse	Décines-Charpieu
15:00 CET (UTC+1)	Cornet 29'; Dembélé 72'; Toko Ekambi 77'	Report	Vainqueur (yellow card) 46'	Stadium: Parc Olympique Lyonnais; Attendance: 42,582; Referee: Antony Gautier

2 February 2020 22	Nice	2–1	Lyon	Nice
15:00 CET (UTC+1)	Dolberg 33', 64'; Ounas (yellow card) 38' (yellow-red card) 45+5'; Claude-Maurice (yellow card) 45+5'; Hérelle (yellow card) 71'	Report	Marçal (red card) 22'; Toko Ekambi 45'; Marcelo (yellow card) 45+5'; Rafael (yellow card) 52'	Stadium: Allianz Riviera; Attendance: 23,553; Referee: Benoît Bastien

5 February 2020 23	Lyon	0–0	Amiens	Décines-Charpieu
19:00 CET (UTC+1)	Jean Lucas (yellow card) 52'	Report	Dibassy (yellow card) 1'; Monconduit (yellow card) 60'	Stadium: Parc Olympique Lyonnais; Attendance: 36,670; Referee: Jérôme Miguelgorry

9 February 2020 24	Paris Saint-Germain	4–2	Lyon	Paris
21:00 CET (UTC+1)	Di María 22'; Mbappé 38'; Kimpembe (yellow card) 45+1'; Marçal 47' (o.g.); Cavani 79'	Report	Terrier 52'; Dembélé 59'; Toko Ekambi (yellow card) 90'; Marcelo (yellow card) 90+2'	Stadium: Parc des Princes; Attendance: 47,000; Referee: Clément Turpin

16 February 2020 25	Lyon	1–1	Strasbourg	Décines-Charpieu
15:00 CET (UTC+1)	Traoré 21', (yellow card) 41'; Aouar (yellow card) 79'; Dembélé (yellow card) 90+4'	Report	Zohi 43'; Koné (yellow card) 47'	Stadium: Parc Olympique Lyonnais; Attendance: 45,141; Referee: Johan Hamel

21 February 2020 26	Metz	0–2	Lyon	Metz
20:45 CET (UTC+1)	Oukidja (yellow card) 45+6'; Diallo (red card) 82'	Report	Cornet (yellow card) 35'; Dembélé 45+7' (pen.); Aouar 90+4'	Stadium: Stade Saint-Symphorien; Attendance: 18,247; Referee: Eric Wattellier

1 March 2020 27	Lyon	2–0	Saint-Étienne	Décines-Charpieu
21:00 CET (UTC+1)	Dembélé 27', 90+5' (pen.), (yellow card) 67'; Dubois (yellow card) 53'; Tousart (yellow card) 77'; Bruno Guimarães (yellow card) 87'	Report	Debuchy (yellow card) 26'; Trauco (yellow card) 39'; Abi (yellow card) 77'; Kolodziejczak (yellow card) 90+3'	Stadium: Parc Olympique Lyonnais; Attendance: 52,772; Referee: Frank Schneider

8 March 2020 28	Lille	1–0	Lyon	Villeneuve-d'Ascq
21:00 CET (UTC+1)	Rémy 33', (yellow card) 45+1'	Report	Toko Ekambi (yellow card) 57'; Traoré (yellow card) 70'; Tousart (yellow card) 78'	Stadium: Stade Pierre-Mauroy; Attendance: 40,164; Referee: Benoît Bastien

29	Lyon	Cancelled	Reims	Décines-Charpieu
--:-- CET (UTC+1)				Stadium: Parc Olympique Lyonnais; Attendance: 0

30	Rennes	Cancelled	Lyon	Rennes
--:-- CET (UTC+1)				Stadium: Roazhon Park; Attendance: 0

31	Lyon	Cancelled	Nîmes	Décines-Charpieu
--:-- CEST (UTC+2)				Stadium: Parc Olympique Lyonnais; Attendance: 0

32	Nantes	Cancelled	Lyon	Nantes
--:-- CEST (UTC+2)				Stadium: Stade de la Beaujoire

33	Lyon	Cancelled	Marseille	Décines-Charpieu
--:-- CEST (UTC+2)				Stadium: Parc Olympique Lyonnais

34	Lyon	Cancelled	Monaco	Décines-Charpieu
--:-- CEST (UTC+2)				Stadium: Parc Olympique Lyonnais

35	Dijon	Cancelled	Lyon	Dijon
--:-- CEST (UTC+2)				Stadium: Stade Gaston Gérard

36	Lyon	Cancelled	Montpellier	Décines-Charpieu
--:-- CEST (UTC+2)				Stadium: Parc Olympique Lyonnais

37	Angers	Cancelled	Lyon	Angers
--:-- CEST (UTC+2)				Stadium: Stade Raymond Kopa

38	Lyon	Cancelled	Brest	Décines-Charpieu
--:-- CEST (UTC+2)				Stadium: Parc Olympique Lyonnais

=== Coupe de France ===
4 January 2020 Round of 64	Football Bourg-en-Bresse 01	0–7	Lyon	Bourg-en-Bresse
20:55 CET (UTC+1)	Lacour (yellow card) 49'; Khous (yellow card) 68'	Report	Tousart (yellow card) 14'; Dembélé 17', 41'; Terrier 47'; Cornet 55'; Caqueret 82'; Aouar 89'; Cherki 90+1'	Stadium: Stade Marcel-Verchère; Attendance: 8,000; Referee: Hakim Ben El Hadj

18 January 2020 Round of 32	Nantes	3–4	Lyon	Nantes
20:55 CET (UTC+1)	Emond 16'; Basila (yellow card) 68'; Girotto (yellow card) 77'; Louza 83'; Simon 87'; Appiah (yellow card) 90+5'	Report	Cherki 1', 9'; Terrier 37'; Dembélé 69'; Marçal (yellow card) 90+4'; Tete (yellow card) 90+6'	Stadium: Stade de la Beaujoire; Attendance: 24,511; Referee: Mikael Lesage

30 January 2020 Round of 16	Nice	1–2	Lyon	Nice
20:55 CET (UTC+1)	Thuram (yellow card) 65'; Ounas 89'; Dante (yellow card) 90+1'	Report	Dembélé 15'; Tete (yellow card) 73'; Marcelo (yellow card) 73'; Rafael (yellow card) 76'; Aouar 90+3' (pen.)	Stadium: Allianz Riviera; Attendance: 9,646; Referee: Frank Schneider

12 February 2020 Quarter-finals	Lyon	1–0	Marseille	Décines-Charpieu
21:05 CET (UTC+1)	Tete (yellow card) 17'; Aouar 81'; Caqueret (yellow card) 89'	Report	Strootman (yellow card) 37'; Sanson (yellow card) 49'; Sakai (yellow card) 69'	Stadium: Parc Olympique Lyonnais; Attendance: 36,000; Referee: Benoît Millot

4 March 2020 Semi-finals	Lyon	1–5	Paris Saint-Germain	Décines-Charpieu
21:10 CET (UTC+1)	Terrier 11'; Marçal (yellow card) 36' (yellow-red card) 61'; Dubois (yellow card) 66'	Report	Mbappé 14', 70', 90+2', (yellow card) 64'; Kurzawa (yellow card) 30'; Meunier (yellow card) 55'; Neymar 64' (pen.), (yellow card) 85'; Sarabia 82'	Stadium: Parc Olympique Lyonnais; Attendance: 42,500; Referee: Ruddy Buquet

=== Coupe de la Ligue ===
18 December 2019 Round of 16	Lyon	4–1	Toulouse	Décines-Charpieu
18:45 CET (UTC+1)	Traoré 2', 57', (yellow card) 53'; Jean Lucas 17', (yellow card) 24'; Terrier 90+1'	Report	Koné 48'	Stadium: Parc Olympique Lyonnais; Attendance: 21,902; Referee: Thomas Leonard

8 January 2020 Quarter-finals	Lyon	3–1	Brest	Décines-Charpieu
18:45 CET (UTC+1)	Dembélé 19'; Tousart (yellow card) 41'; Aouar 55', (yellow card) 59'; Jean Lucas 90+1', (yellow card) 90+2'; Caqueret (yellow card) 90+3'	Report	Magnetti (yellow card) 59'; Charbonnier (yellow card) 63'; N'Goma (yellow card) 84'; Grandsir 85'; Perraud (yellow card) 87'	Stadium: Parc Olympique Lyonnais; Attendance: 20,096; Referee: Jérôme Brisard

21 January 2020 Semi-finals	Lyon	2–2 (4–3 p)	Lille	Décines-Charpieu
21:10 CET (UTC+1)	Dembélé 17' (pen.); T. Mendes (yellow card) 37'; Marçal (yellow card) 81'; Aouar 85'; Rafael (yellow card) 90+1'; Denayer (yellow card) 90+2'; Marcelo (yellow card) 90+4'	Report	Sanches 12'; Mandava (yellow card) 59'; Rémy 90+3' (pen.)	Stadium: Parc Olympique Lyonnais; Attendance: 35,248; Referee: Benoît Millot
	Penalties
	Dembélé (penalty scored); Terrier (penalty scored); Cornet (penalty scored); T. Mendes (penalty scored)		(penalty missed) Bamba; (penalty scored) Rémy; (penalty scored) André; (penalty scored) Osimhen; (penalty missed) Sanches

31 July 2020 Final	Paris Saint-Germain	0–0 (a.e.t.) (6–5 p)	Lyon	Saint-Denis
21:10 CEST (UTC+2)	Thiago Silva (yellow card) 55'; Herrera (yellow card) 79'; Marquinhos (yellow card) 94'; Paredes (yellow card) 100'; Di María (yellow card) 115'	Report	Caqueret (yellow card) 19'; Bruno Guimarães (yellow card) 61'; Marçal (yellow card) 94'; Rafael (red card) 119'	Stadium: Stade de France; Attendance: 5,000; Referee: Jérôme Brisard
	Penalties
	Di María (penalty scored); Verratti (penalty scored); Paredes (penalty scored); Herrera (penalty scored); Neymar (penalty scored); Sarabia (penalty scored)		(penalty scored) Andersen; (penalty scored) Toko Ekambi; (penalty scored) Caqueret; (penalty scored) Mendes; (penalty scored) Aouar; (penalty missed) Traoré
Note: Match originally scheduled for 4 April, but postponed due to concerns over the coronavirus pandemic. It was rescheduled to 31 July.

=== UEFA Champions League ===
==== Group stage ====
Pos	Team	Pld	W	D	L	GF	GA	GD	Pts	Qualification	RBL	LYO	BEN	ZEN
1	(Germany) RB Leipzig	6	3	2	1	10	8	+2	11	Advance to knockout phase	—	0–2	2–2	2–1
2	(France) Lyon	6	2	2	2	9	8	+1	8	Advance to knockout phase	2–2	—	3–1	1–1
3	(Portugal) Benfica	6	2	1	3	10	11	−1	7 (Note: Tied on head-to-head points (3). Head-to-head goal difference: Benfica +1, Zenit Saint Petersburg −1.)	Transfer to Europa League	1–2	2–1	—	3–0
4	(Russia) Zenit Saint Petersburg	6	2	1	3	7	9	−2	7		0–2	2–0	3–1	—

Source: UEFA
Rules for classification: Group stage tiebreakers
Notes:

17 September 2019 1	Lyon (France)	1–1	(Russia) Zenit Saint Petersburg	Décines-Charpieu, France
19:55 CEST (UTC+2)	Depay 51' (pen.); Koné (yellow card) 71'	Report	Azmoun (yellow card) 38', (goal) 41'; Rakitskiy (yellow card) 61'; Kuzyayev (yellow card) 70'; Shatov (yellow card) 87'	Stadium: Parc Olympique Lyonnais; Attendance: 47,201; Referee: Michael Oliver (England)

2 October 2019 2	RB Leipzig (Germany)	0–2	(France) Lyon	Leipzig, Germany
21:00 CEST (UTC+2)	Haidara (yellow card) 43'; Upamecano (yellow card) 54'; Orbán (yellow card) 55'	Report	Depay 11'; Terrier 65'	Stadium: Red Bull Arena; Attendance: 40,194; Referee: Antonio Mateu Lahoz (Spain)

23 October 2019 3	Benfica (Portugal)	2–1	(France) Lyon	Lisbon, Portugal
21:00 CEST (UTC+2)	Rafa 4'; Pizzi (yellow card) 42', (goal) 86'; Fernandes (yellow card) 59'	Report	Marcelo (yellow card) 10'; Dembélé (yellow card) 26'; Koné (yellow card) 38'; Depay 70'	Stadium: Estádio da Luz; Attendance: 53,035; Referee: Ivan Kružliak (Slovakia)

5 November 2019 4	Lyon (France)	3–1	(Portugal) Benfica	Décines-Charpieu, France
21:00 CET (UTC+1)	Andersen 4'; Depay 33'; Traoré 89'	Report	Gabriel (yellow card) 43'; Florentino (yellow card) 50'; Seferovic 76'	Stadium: Parc Olympique Lyonnais; Attendance: 51,077; Referee: Björn Kuipers (Netherlands)

27 November 2019 5	Zenit Saint Petersburg (Russia)	2–0	(France) Lyon	Saint Petersburg, Russia
18:55 CET (UTC+1)	Kuzyayev (yellow card) 16'; Dzyuba 42'; Barrios (yellow card) 57'; Ozdoyev (yellow card) 73', (goal) 84'; Rakitskiy (yellow card) 89'	Report	Andersen (yellow card) 29'; Marçal (yellow card) 43'; Dubois (yellow card) 44'	Stadium: Krestovsky Stadium; Attendance: 51,183; Referee: Daniele Orsato (Italy)

10 December 2019 6	Lyon (France)	2–2	(Germany) RB Leipzig	Décines-Charpieu, France
21:00 CET (UTC+1)	T. Mendes (yellow card) 33'; Aouar 50'; Depay 82'	Report	Upamecano (yellow card) 3'; Forsberg 9' (pen.); Werner 33' (pen.); Mukiele (yellow card) 52'; Saracchi (yellow card) 63'	Stadium: Parc Olympique Lyonnais; Attendance: 53,288; Referee: Anthony Taylor (England)

==== Knockout phase ====
26 February 2020 Round of 16; First leg	Lyon (France)	1–0	(Italy) Juventus	Décines-Charpieu, France
21:00 CET (UTC+1)	Marcelo (yellow card) 28'; Tousart 31'; Cornet (yellow card) 61'	Report		Stadium: Parc Olympique Lyonnais; Attendance: 57,335; Referee: Jesús Gil Manzano (Spain)

7 August 2020 Round of 16; Second leg	Juventus (Italy)	2–1 (2–2 (a) agg.)	(France) Lyon	Turin, Italy
21:00 CEST (UTC+2)	Cuadrado (yellow card) 31'; Ronaldo 43' (pen.), 60'; Bentancur (yellow card) 44'	Report	Depay 12' (pen.), (yellow card) 42'; Aouar (yellow card) 19'; Dubois (yellow card) 38'; Lopes (yellow card) 76'; Cornet (yellow card) 79'; Caqueret (yellow card) 87'; Marçal (yellow card) 89'	Stadium: Juventus Stadium; Attendance: 0 Referee: Felix Zwayer (Germany)
Note: The match between Juventus and Lyon in Turin was initially scheduled for 17 March to be played behind closed doors due to an outbreak of COVID-19 in Italy. However on 12 March, the match was postponed as the Juventus players were quarantined due to a pandemic of COVID-19 in Italy. The match was rescheduled on 17 June to 7 August.

15 August 2020 Quarter-finals	Manchester City (England)	1–3	(France) Lyon	Lisbon, Portugal
21:00 CEST (UTC+2)	Fernandinho (yellow card) 29'; Rodri (yellow card) 58'; De Bruyne 69'	Report	Dubois (yellow card) 12'; Cornet 24'; Marcelo (yellow card) 65'; Dembélé 79', 87'	Stadium: Estádio José Alvalade; Attendance: 0 Referee: Danny Makkelie (Netherlands)

19 August 2020 Semi-finals	Lyon (France)	0–3	(Germany) Bayern Munich	Lisbon, Portugal
21:00 CEST (UTC+2)	Marcelo (yellow card) 35'; Marçal (yellow card) 42'; Mendes (yellow card) 86'	Report	Gnabry 18', 33'; Lewandowski 88'	Stadium: Estádio José Alvalade; Attendance: 0 Referee: Antonio Mateu Lahoz (Spain)

== Statistics ==
=== Appearances and goals ===
No.	Pos	Nat	Player	Total		Ligue 1		Coupe de France		Coupe de la Ligue		UEFA Champions League	
No.	Pos	Nat	Player	Apps	Goals	Apps	Goals	Apps	Goals	Apps	Goals	Apps	Goals
Goalkeepers
1	GK	(Portugal) POR	Anthony Lopes	41	0	26	0	4	0	1	0	10	0
16	GK	(Switzerland) SUI	Anthony Racioppi	0	0	0	0	0	0	0	0	0	0
30	GK	(Romania) ROU	Ciprian Tătărușanu	6	0	2	0	1	0	3	0	0	0
Defenders
2	DF	(France) FRA	Mapou Yanga-Mbiwa	0	0	0	0	0	0	0	0	0	0
3	DF	(Denmark) DEN	Joachim Andersen	32	2	17+1	1	3+1	0	2+2	0	4+2	1
4	DF	(Brazil) BRA	Rafael	19	0	9+4	0	2+1	0	1+1	0	1	0
5	DF	(Belgium) BEL	Jason Denayer	41	0	24+1	0	4	0	3	0	9	0
6	DF	(Brazil) BRA	Marcelo	33	0	17	0	3	0	3	0	8+2	0
14	DF	(France) FRA	Léo Dubois	27	0	15+1	0	1	0	1	0	9	0
20	DF	(Brazil) BRA	Marçal	25	0	11	0	2+3	0	2	0	6+1	0
23	DF	(Netherlands) NED	Kenny Tete	28	0	9+9	0	3	0	2	0	1+4	0
26	DF	(France) FRA	Oumar Solet	1	0	0+1	0	0	0	0	0	0	0
28	DF	(Mali) MLI	Youssouf Koné	16	0	10+1	0	0	0	0	0	4+1	0
31	DF	(France) FRA	Melvin Bard	1	0	0+1	0	0	0	0	0	0	0
Midfielders
8	MF	(France) FRA	Houssem Aouar	41	9	23+2	3	3+1	3	3+1	2	8	1
12	MF	(Brazil) BRA	Thiago Mendes	37	0	21+1	0	0+3	0	3+1	0	4+4	0
17	MF	(France) FRA	Jeff Reine-Adélaïde	22	2	11+3	2	0	0	0	0	3+5	0
18	MF	(France) FRA	Rayan Cherki	13	3	1+5	0	2+1	3	1+1	0	0+2	0
22	MF	(Brazil) BRA	Jean Lucas	17	3	1+10	1	2+1	0	1+1	2	0+1	0
25	MF	(France) FRA	Maxence Caqueret	16	1	7+1	0	2	1	2+1	0	3	0
29	MF	(France) FRA	Lucas Tousart	39	3	19+5	2	5	0	1+2	0	7	1
39	MF	(Brazil) BRA	Bruno Guimarães	9	0	3	0	1	0	1	0	4	0
Forwards
7	FW	(France) FRA	Martin Terrier	35	6	13+10	1	4	3	2+1	1	3+2	1
9	FW	(France) FRA	Moussa Dembélé	46	24	24+3	16	5	4	3+1	2	6+4	2
10	FW	(Burkina Faso) BFA	Bertrand Traoré	35	4	14+9	1	2+1	0	3+1	2	2+3	1
11	FW	(Netherlands) NED	Memphis Depay	22	15	12+1	9	0	0	1	0	8	6
19	FW	(France) FRA	Amine Gouiri	5	0	0+1	0	0+2	0	1	0	0+1	0
21	FW	(Cameroon) CMR	Karl Toko Ekambi	16	2	5+3	2	2+1	0	0+1	0	4	0
27	FW	(Ivory Coast) CIV	Maxwel Cornet	38	6	14+8	4	4	1	4	0	6+2	1
35	MF	(France) FRA	Boubacar Fofana	0	0	0	0	0	0	0	0	0	0
Players transferred out during the season
24	MF	(Spain) ESP	Pape Cheikh Diop	0	0	0	0	0	0	0	0	0	0
17	FW	(France) FRA	Lenny Pintor	0	0	0	0	0	0	0	0	0	0

Source: Competitions

=== Goalscorers ===
Rank	No.	Pos	Nat	Name	Ligue 1	Coupe de France	Coupe de la Ligue	Champions League	Total
1	9	FW	(France)	Moussa Dembélé	16	4	2	2	24
2	11	FW	(Netherlands)	Memphis Depay	9	0	0	6	15
3	8	MF	(France)	Houssem Aouar	3	3	2	1	9
4	7	FW	(France)	Martin Terrier	1	3	1	1	6
4	27	FW	(Ivory Coast)	Maxwel Cornet	4	1	0	1	6
6	10	FW	(Burkina Faso)	Bertrand Traoré	1	0	2	1	4
7	18	FW	(France)	Rayan Cherki	0	3	0	0	3
7	22	MF	(Brazil)	Jean Lucas	1	0	2	0	3
7	29	MF	(France)	Lucas Tousart	2	0	0	1	3
10	3	DF	(Denmark)	Joachim Andersen	1	0	0	1	2
10	17	MF	(France)	Jeff Reine-Adélaïde	2	0	0	0	2
10	21	FW	(Cameroon)	Karl Toko Ekambi	2	0	0	0	2
13	25	MF	(France)	Maxence Caqueret	0	1	0	0	1
Own goals					0	0	0	0	0
Totals					42	15	9	14	80

=== Disciplinary record ===
No.	Pos	Nat	Name	Ligue 1			Coupe de France			Coupe de la Lige			Champions League			Total		
No.	Pos	Nat	Name	Yellow card	(yellow card) (yellow-red card)	Red card	Yellow card	(yellow card) (yellow-red card)	Red card	Yellow card	(yellow card) (yellow-red card)	Red card	Yellow card	(yellow card) (yellow-red card)	Red card	Yellow card	(yellow card) (yellow-red card)	Red card
3	DF	(Denmark)	Joachim Andersen	1	0	0	0	0	0	0	0	0	0	0	0	1	0	0
14	DF	(France)	Léo Dubois	1	0	0	0	0	0	0	0	0	0	0	0	1	0	0
23	DF	(Netherlands)	Kenny Tete	1	0	0	0	0	0	0	0	0	0	0	0	1	0	0
28	DF	(Mali)	Youssouf Koné	0	0	1	0	0	0	0	0	0	0	0	0	0	0	1
8	MF	(France)	Houssem Aouar	1	0	0	0	0	0	0	0	0	0	0	0	1	0	0
12	MF	(Brazil)	Thiago Mendes	1	0	0	0	0	0	0	0	0	0	0	0	1	0	0
29	MF	(France)	Lucas Tousart	1	0	0	0	0	0	0	0	0	0	0	0	1	0	0
10	FW	(Burkina Faso)	Bertrand Traoré	1	0	0	0	0	0	0	0	0	0	0	0	1	0	0
19	FW	(France)	Amine Gouiri	1	0	0	0	0	0	0	0	0	0	0	0	1	0	0

Last updated: 27 August 2019
