= 2017–18 Olympique Lyonnais season =

Lyon
2017–18 season
- Owner: OL Groupe
- Chairman: Jean-Michel Aulas
- Manager: Bruno Génésio
- Stadium: Parc Olympique Lyonnais
- Ligue 1: 3rd
- Coupe de France: Quarter-finals
- Coupe de la Ligue: Round of 16
- UEFA Europa League: Round of 16
- Top goalscorer: League: Memphis Depay (19); All: Nabil Fekir (23)
- Highest home attendance: 57,582 vs. Paris Saint-Germain (21 January 2018)
- Lowest home attendance: 26,972 vs. Apollon Limassol (23 November 2017)
Home colours	Away colours	Third colours

The 2017–18 season was Olympique Lyonnais's 68th professional season since its creation in 1950.

== Players ==
=== Squad information ===
Note: Flags indicate national team as defined under FIFA eligibility rules; some limited exceptions apply. Players may hold more than one non-FIFA nationality.

No.	Pos.	Nation	Player
1	GK	POR	Anthony Lopes
2	DF	FRA	Mapou Yanga-Mbiwa
4	DF	BRA	Rafael
5	DF	FRA	Mouctar Diakhaby
6	DF	BRA	Marcelo
8	MF	FRA	Houssem Aouar
9	FW	DOM	Mariano Díaz
10	FW	BFA	Bertrand Traoré
11	FW	NED	Memphis Depay
12	MF	FRA	Jordan Ferri
13	FW	FRA	Willem Geubbels
14	MF	ESP	Sergi Darder
15	DF	FRA	Jérémy Morel

No.	Pos.	Nation	Player
16	GK	FRA	Lucas Mocio
17	FW	FRA	Myziane Maolida
18	FW	FRA	Nabil Fekir (captain)
19	FW	FRA	Amine Gouiri
20	DF	BRA	Marçal
22	DF	FRA	Ferland Mendy
23	DF	NED	Kenny Tete
24	MF	ESP	Pape Cheikh Diop
25	MF	LUX	Christopher Martins
27	FW	CIV	Maxwel Cornet
28	MF	FRA	Tanguy Ndombele
29	MF	FRA	Lucas Tousart
30	GK	FRA	Mathieu Gorgelin
31	DF	FRA	Louis Nganioni

=== Out on loan ===
Note: Flags indicate national team as defined under FIFA eligibility rules; some limited exceptions apply. Players may hold more than one non-FIFA nationality.

No.	Pos.	Nation	Player
—	DF	CMR	Nicolas Nkoulou (on loan to Torino until 30 June 2018)
—	MF	FRA	Maxime D'Arpino (on loan to Orléans until 30 June 2018)
—	MF	FRA	Olivier Kemen (on loan to Gazélec until 30 June 2018)
—	MF	FRA	Romain Del Castillo (on loan to Nîmes until 30 June 2018)

No.	Pos.	Nation	Player
—	MF	ESP	Sergi Darder (on loan to Espanyol until 30 June 2018)
—	FW	FRA	Aldo Kalulu (on loan to Sochaux until 30 June 2018)
—	FW	FRA	Gaëtan Perrin (on loan to Orléans until 30 June 2018)
—	FW	FRA	Jean-Philippe Mateta (on loan to Le Havre until 30 June 2018)

== Transfers ==
=== In ===
Date	Pos.	Player	Age	Moved from	Fee	Notes
1 July 2017	FW	(Burkina Faso) Bertrand Traoré	21	(England) Chelsea	€10,000,000	
1 July 2017	FW	(Dominican Republic) Mariano	23	(Spain) Real Madrid	€8,000,000	
1 July 2017	DF	(France) Ferland Mendy	22	(France) Le Havre	€5,000,000	
1 July 2017	DF	(Brazil) Marçal	28	(Portugal) Benfica	€4,500,000	
10 July 2017	DF	(Netherlands) Kenny Tete	21	(Netherlands) Ajax	€3,000,000	
13 July 2017	DF	(Brazil) Marcelo	30	(Turkey) Beşiktaş	€7,500,000	
29 August 2017	MF	(Spain) Pape Cheikh Diop	20	(Spain) Celta Vigo	€10,000,000	
1 September 2017	MF	(France) Tanguy Ndombele	20	(France) Amiens	€11,000,000	

==== Out ====
Date	Pos.	Player	Age	Moved to	Fee	Notes
1 July 2017	MF	(France) Corentin Tolisso	22	(Germany) Bayern Munich	€41,500,000	
1 July 2017	MF	(France) Mathieu Valbuena	32	(Turkey) Fenerbahçe	€1,500,000	
1 July 2017	DF	(France) Jordy Gaspar	20	(France) Monaco	Free Transfer	
3 July 2017	MF	(France) Maxime Gonalons	28	(Italy) Roma	€5,000,000	
5 July 2017	FW	(France) Alexandre Lacazette	26	(England) Arsenal	£46,500,000 (Could rise to £52m)	
18 July 2017	DF	(France) Christophe Jallet	33	(France) Nice	Free Transfer	
19 July 2017	DF	(Poland) Maciej Rybus	27	(Russia) Lokomotiv Moscow	Undisclosed	
31 July 2017	DF	(Argentina) Emanuel Mammana	21	(Russia) Zenit Saint Petersburg	€16,000,000	
7 August 2017	MF	(Algeria) Rachid Ghezzal	25	(France) Monaco	Free Transfer	

==== Loans out ====
Date	Pos.	Player	Age	Loaned to	Return date	Notes
1 July 2017	FW	(France) Jean-Philippe Mateta	20	(France) Le Havre	30 June 2018	
1 July 2017	FW	(France) Gaëtan Perrin	21	(France) Orléans	30 June 2018	
10 July 2017	MF	(France) Olivier Kemen	20	(France) Gazélec Ajaccio	30 June 2018	
24 July 2017	FW	(France) Aldo Kalulu	21	(France) Sochaux	30 June 2018	
5 August 2017	DF	(Cameroon) Nicolas Nkoulou	27	(Italy) Torino	30 June 2018	
30 August 2017	MF	(France) Romain Del Castillo	21	(France) Nîmes	30 June 2018	
31 August 2017	DF	(Spain) Sergi Darder	23	(Spain) Espanyol	30 June 2018	

== Pre-season and friendlies ==
=== Friendlies ===
8 July 2017	Bourg-Péronnas	1–3	Lyon	Péronnas
19:15 CEST	Boussaha 57' (pen.)	Report	Yanga-Mbiwa 23'; Geubbels 44'; Dzabana 71'	Stadium: Stade Municipal de Péronnas

15 July 2017	Celtic (Scotland)	0–4	(France) Lyon	Glasgow, Scotland
16:00 CEST		Report	Cornet 52'; Maolida 61'; Fekir 78'; Gouiri 87'	Stadium: Celtic Park; Referee: Bobby Madden (Scotland)

18 July 2017	Lyon (France)	2–0	(Netherlands) Ajax	Bourgoin-Jallieu, France
21:00 CEST	Viergever 12' (o.g.); Darder (yellow card) 20'; Gouiri 77'	Report	De Ligt (yellow card) 64'	Stadium: Stade Pierre Rajon

30 July 2017	Montpellier	1–1	Lyon	Sète
20:30 CEST	Sio 45'	Report	Morel (red card); Fekir 60'	Stadium: Stade Louis Michel

8 August 2017	Lyon (France)	2–1	(Brazil) Chapecoense	Lyon, France
18:00 CEST	Maolida 25'; Gouiri 62'	Report	De Melo 15'	Stadium: Centre Tola Vologe

=== International Champions Cup ===
24 July 2017	Internazionale (Italy)	1–0	(France) Lyon	Nanjing, China
20:05 CST	D'Ambrosio (yellow card) 16'; Jovetić 74'	Report	Darder (yellow card) 45'	Stadium: Nanjing Olympic Sports Centre; Referee: Ma Ning (China)

Pos	Team	Pld	W	WPEN	LPEN	L	GF	GA	GD	Pts
1	(Germany) Borussia Dortmund	1	1	0	0	0	3	1	+2	3
2	(Italy) Internazionale	1	1	0	0	0	1	0	+1	3
3	(Italy) Milan	2	1	0	0	1	5	3	+2	3
4	(England) Arsenal	1	0	1	0	0	1	1	0	2
5	(Germany) Bayern Munich	2	0	0	1	1	1	5	−4	1
6	(France) Lyon	1	0	0	0	1	0	1	−1	0

Source: ICC
Rules for classification: 1) Points; 2) Goal difference; 3) Goals scored

== Competitions ==
=== Ligue 1 ===
==== League table ====
Pos	Team	Pld	W	D	L	GF	GA	GD	Pts	Qualification or relegation
1	Paris Saint-Germain (C)	38	29	6	3	108	29	+79	93	Qualification for the Champions League group stage
2	Monaco	38	24	8	6	85	45	+40	80	Qualification for the Champions League group stage
3	Lyon	38	23	9	6	87	43	+44	78	Qualification for the Champions League group stage
4	Marseille	38	22	11	5	80	47	+33	77	Qualification for the Europa League group stage (Note: Since the winners of the 2017–18 Coupe de France and the 2017–18 Coupe de la Ligue, Paris Saint-Germain, qualified for European competition based on league position, the spot awarded to the Coupe de France winners (Europa League group stage) was passed to the fourth-placed team and the spot awarded to the Coupe de la Ligue winners (Europa League third qualifying round) was passed to the sixth-placed team. The fifth-placed team received the spot in Europa League third qualifying round originally designated to the fourth-placed team.)
5	Rennes	38	16	10	12	50	44	+6	58	Qualification for the Europa League group stage

Source: Ligue 1 and Soccerway
Rules for classification: 1) Points; 2) Goal difference; 3) Head-to-head points; 4) Head-to-head goal difference; 5) Head-to-head goals scored; 6) Head-to-head away goals; 7) Goals scored; 8) Away goals scored; 9) Most goals scored in one league match; 10) Fair-play points
(C) Champions

==== Results summary ====
Overall								Home						Away					
Pld	W	D	L	GF	GA	GD	Pts	W	D	L	GF	GA	GD	W	D	L	GF	GA	GD
38	23	9	6	87	43	+44	78	12	5	2	38	18	+20	11	4	4	49	25	+24

Last updated: 19 May 2018.
Source: Results

==== Results by round ====
Round	1	2	3	4	5	6	7	8	9	10	11	12	13	14	15	16	17	18	19	20	21	22	23	24	25	26	27	28	29	30	31	32	33	34	35	36	37	38
Ground	H	A	H	A	H	A	H	A	H	A	H	A	H	A	H	A	A	H	A	H	A	H	A	A	H	A	H	A	H	A	H	A	H	A	H	H	A	H
Result	W	W	D	D	W	L	D	D	W	W	W	W	D	W	L	W	W	W	W	D	W	W	L	L	L	D	D	D	W	W	W	W	W	W	W	W	L	W
Position	1	1	4	4	3	5	7	8	6	4	3	3	3	2	3	2	2	3	3	3	2	2	2	4	4	4	4	4	4	4	4	3	3	3	2	2	3	3

Source: Ligue1
A = Away; H = Home; W = Win; D = Draw; L = Loss

==== Matches ====
5 August 2017 1	Lyon	4–0	Strasbourg	Décines-Charpieu
20:00	Mariano 23', 61', (yellow card) 28'; Tousart (yellow card) 43'; Fekir 59' (pen.), 90+1'	Report	Da Costa (yellow card) 44'; Salmier (yellow card) 64'; Sacko (yellow card) 78'	Stadium: Parc Olympique Lyonnais; Attendance: 39,177; Referee: Ruddy Buquet

11 August 2017 2	Rennes	1–2	Lyon	Rennes
20:45	Bensebaini (yellow card) 15'; Bourigeaud 86'	Report	Marçal (yellow card) 9'; Depay 57'; Tousart (yellow card) 68'; Mariano 74'; Darder (yellow card) 84'	Stadium: Roazhon Park; Attendance: 24,944; Referee: Benoît Millot

19 August 2017 3	Lyon	3–3	Bordeaux	Décines-Charpieu
17:00	Fekir 10'; Tete 23'; Darder (yellow card) 33' (yellow-red card) 36'; Traoré (yellow card) 39', (goal) 75'; Morel (yellow card) 82'	Report	Malcom 41', 90+1'; Lerager (yellow card) 59', (goal) 88'; Cafu (yellow card) 64'	Stadium: Parc Olympique Lyonnais; Attendance: 42,073; Referee: Clément Turpin

26 August 2017 4	Nantes	0–0	Lyon	Nantes
17:15	Girotto (yellow card) 31'	Report	Tete (yellow card) 68'	Stadium: Stade de la Beaujoire; Attendance: 30,718; Referee: Antony Gautier

9 September 2017 5	Lyon	2–1	Guingamp	Décines-Charpieu
17:00	Mariano 19'; Martins (yellow card) 28'; Fekir 72'; Marcelo (yellow card) 83'	Report	Rebocho (yellow card) 32'; Thuram 71'; Blas (yellow card) 82'	Stadium: Parc Olympique Lyonnais; Attendance: 36,697; Referee: Benoît Millot

17 September 2017 6	Paris Saint-Germain	2–0	Lyon	Paris
21:00	Motta (yellow card) 45'; Marcelo 75' (o.g.); Neymar (yellow card) 76'; Thiago Silva (yellow card) 81'; Morel 86' (o.g.)	Report	Fekir (yellow card) 55'; Mendy (yellow card) 79'	Stadium: Parc des Princes; Attendance: 47,191; Referee: Ruddy Buquet

23 September 2017 7	Lyon	3–3	Dijon	Décines-Charpieu
20:00	Fekir 20'; Ndombele (yellow card) 58'; Aouar 60'; Mariano 63' (pen.)	Report	Yambéré (yellow card) 3', (goal) 66'; Sliti 24' (pen.); Amalfitano (yellow card) 40'; Xeka 52'; Reynet (yellow card) 59'; Rosier (yellow card) 75'; Saïd (yellow card) 89'	Stadium: Parc Olympique Lyonnais; Attendance: 33,600; Referee: Antony Gautier

1 October 2017 8	Angers	3–3	Lyon	Angers
17:00	Rafael 30' (o.g.); Toko Ekambi 58'; Thomas (yellow card) 59'; I. Traoré 67'; Santamaria (yellow card) 78'	Report	Mariano 5'; Diakhaby 38'; Depay 42'; Marcelo (yellow card) 50' (yellow-red card) 50'; Rafael (yellow card) 64'; Ferri (yellow card) 90+2'	Stadium: Stade Raymond Kopa; Attendance: 11,432; Referee: Mikael Lesage

13 October 2017 9	Lyon	3–2	Monaco	Décines-Charpieu
20:45	Mariano 11'; Fekir 23', 90+5', (yellow card) 45'; Yanga-Mbiwa (yellow card) 48'; A. Lopes (yellow card) 52'; Diakhaby (yellow card) 68'	Report	R. Lopes 17'; A. Traoré 34', (yellow card) 55'	Stadium: Parc Olympique Lyonnais; Attendance: 43,295; Referee: Benoît Bastien

22 October 2017 10	Troyes	0–5	Lyon	Troyes
17:00	Grandsir (yellow card) 18'; Dingomé (yellow card) 59'; Hérelle (red card) 69'	Report	Morel (yellow card) 15'; Traoré 21'; Rafael (yellow card) 33'; Depay 49', 65', 70' (pen.); Mariano 90'	Stadium: Stade de l'Aube; Attendance: 14,722; Referee: François Letexier

29 October 2017 11	Lyon	2–0	Metz	Décines-Charpieu
15:00	Fekir 6', 20'	Report	Cafú (yellow card) 42'; Phillips (yellow card) 48'; Rivierez (yellow card) 62'	Stadium: Parc Olympique Lyonnais; Attendance: 53,921; Referee: Benoît Millot

5 November 2017 12	Saint-Étienne	0–5	Lyon	Saint-Étienne
21:00	Lacroix (red card) 47'; Selnæs (yellow card) 60'	Report	Depay 11'; Fekir 26', 85', (yellow card) 85'; Tousart (yellow card) 54'; Mariano 58'; Traoré 65'	Stadium: Stade Geoffroy-Guichard; Attendance: 38,993; Referee: Clément Turpin

19 November 2017 13	Lyon	0–0	Montpellier	Décines-Charpieu
17:00	Tete (yellow card) 23'; Traoré (yellow card) 77'	Report	Píriz (yellow card) 5'	Stadium: Parc Olympique Lyonnais; Attendance: 47,651; Referee: Karim Abed

26 November 2017 14	Nice	0–5	Lyon	Nice
15:00	Marlon (yellow card) 12' (yellow-red card) 70'; Seri (yellow card) 22'; Dante (yellow card) 61'; Mendy (yellow card) 74'	Report	Depay 5', 38'; Cornet 20', (yellow card) 22'; Mariano 27'; Marcelo (yellow card) 35'; Maolida 79'; Ferri (yellow card) 86'	Stadium: Allianz Riviera; Attendance: 27,542; Referee: Frank Schneider

29 November 2017 15	Lyon	1–2	Lille	Décines-Charpieu
19:00	Mariano 36'	Report	Mendes 21'; Ponce 40'; Ballo-Touré (yellow card) 46'	Stadium: Parc Olympique Lyonnais; Attendance: 31,679; Referee: Jérôme Miguelgorry

3 December 2017 16	Caen	1–2	Lyon	Caen
17:00	Mbengue (yellow card) 60'; Santini 90'	Report	Cornet 10'; Fekir (yellow card) 36'; Mariano 54', (yellow card) 59'; Rafael (yellow card) 90+1'	Stadium: Stade Michel d'Ornano; Attendance: 19,455; Referee: Amaury Delerue

10 December 2017 17	Amiens	1–2	Lyon	Amiens
15:00	Gakpé 9'; Monconduit (yellow card) 27'	Report	Aouar 79', 90+4'; Fekir (yellow card) 85'; Tousart (yellow card) 88'	Stadium: Stade de la Licorne; Attendance: 9,130; Referee: Olivier Thual

17 December 2017 18	Lyon	2–0	Marseille	Décines-Charpieu
21:00	Fekir 6'; Mariano 51'	Report	Rolando (yellow card) 26'; Lopez (yellow card) 66'	Stadium: Parc Olympique Lyonnais; Attendance: 57,206; Referee: Benoît Bastien

20 December 2017 19	Toulouse	1–2	Lyon	Toulouse
20:50	Lafont (yellow card) 23'; Imbula (yellow card) 55'; Sangaré (yellow card) 72'; Gradel 90+6' (pen.)	Report	Fekir 24' (pen.); Mariano (yellow card) 43'; Ferri (yellow card) 74'; Rafael 90+3'	Stadium: Stadium Municipal; Attendance: 15,853; Referee: François Letexier

13 January 2018 20	Lyon	1–1	Angers	Décines-Charpieu
17:00	Tousart (yellow card) 21'; Fekir 47'; Rafael (yellow card) 53'	Report	Toko Ekambi 14' (pen.); Tait (yellow card) 37' (yellow-red card) 84'; Bamba (yellow card) 39'; Fulgini (yellow card) 45+2'	Stadium: Parc Olympique Lyonnais; Attendance: 36,691; Referee: Frank Schneider

17 January 2018 21	Guingamp	0–2	Lyon	Guingamp
19:00	Diallo (yellow card) 39'; Tabanou (yellow card) 45'	Report	Ndombele (yellow card) 9'; Tousart (yellow card) 18'; Fekir 26'; Aouar 58'	Stadium: Stade de Roudourou; Attendance: 14,638; Referee: Nicolas Rainville

21 January 2018 22	Lyon	2–1	Paris Saint-Germain	Décines-Charpieu
21:00	Fekir 2'; Mendy (yellow card) 60'; Depay 90+5', (yellow card) 90+5'	Report	Kurzawa 45+3'; Lo Celso (yellow card) 53'; Dani Alves (red card) 57'; Verratti (yellow card) 77'; Cavani (yellow card) 80'	Stadium: Parc Olympique Lyonnais; Attendance: 57,582; Referee: Clément Turpin

28 January 2018 23	Bordeaux	3–1	Lyon	Bordeaux
17:00	De Préville 22', (yellow card) 61'; Malcom 27' (pen.); Otávio (yellow card) 36' (yellow-red card) 76'; Laborde 45+1' (pen.)	Report	Fekir (yellow card) 11'; Rafael (yellow card) 19'; Marcelo 44', (yellow card) 84'	Stadium: Nouveau Stade de Bordeaux; Attendance: 29,310; Referee: François Letexier

4 February 2018 24	Monaco	3–2	Lyon	Fontvieille, Monaco
21:00	Keita 31', (yellow card) 40' (yellow-red card) 44'; Falcao 37'; R. Lopes 88'; Sy (yellow card) 90+1'	Report	Mariano 12'; Traoré 27'; Tete (yellow card) 31'; Mendy (yellow card) 35'; Ndombele (yellow card) 41'	Stadium: Stade Louis II; Attendance: 10,301; Referee: Benoît Bastien

10 February 2018 25	Lyon	0–2	Rennes	Décines-Charpieu
21:00	B. Traoré (yellow card) 58'; Fekir (yellow card) 58'	Report	Khazri 5'; H. Traoré (yellow card) 7'; Lea Siliki 90+3'	Stadium: Parc Olympique Lyonnais; Attendance: 39,189; Referee: Amaury Delerue

17 February 2018 26	Lille	2–2	Lyon	Villeneuve-d'Ascq
17:00	Pépé 65'; Luiz Araújo 81'	Report	Traoré 21', 44'; Rafael (yellow card) 28'; Diakhaby (yellow card) 60'; Fekir (yellow card) 87'; Aouar (yellow card) 90+1'	Stadium: Stade Pierre-Mauroy; Attendance: 39,523; Referee: Benoît Millot

25 February 2018 27	Lyon	1–1	Saint-Étienne	Décines-Charpieu
17:00	Mariano 19', (yellow card) 77'	Report	Selnæs (yellow card) 42'; Subotić (yellow card) 84'; Debuchy 90'; Hamouma (yellow card) 90+3'	Stadium: Parc Olympique Lyonnais; Attendance: 58,069; Referee: Ruddy Buquet

4 March 2018 28	Montpellier	1–1	Lyon	Montpellier
17:00	Mbenza 7'; Mukiele (yellow card) 27'; Skhiri (yellow card) 60'	Report	Marcelo (yellow card) 50'; Mariano 58'; Depay (yellow card) 65'	Stadium: Stade de la Mosson; Attendance: 15,160; Referee: Benoît Bastien

10 March 2018 29	Lyon	1–0	Caen	Décines-Charpieu
17:00	Mariano (yellow card) 46'; Traoré 63'	Report	Peeters (yellow card) 14'	Stadium: Parc Olympique Lyonnais; Attendance: 39,530; Referee: Clément Turpin

18 March 2018 30	Marseille	2–3	Lyon	Marseille
21:00	Thauvin (yellow card) 18'; Rolando 31'; Mitroglou 84', (yellow card) 89'	Report	Rafael (yellow card) 21'; Rami 42' (o.g.); Mariano (yellow card) 48'; Aouar 52'; Depay 90', (yellow card) 90'	Stadium: Stade Vélodrome; Attendance: 60,009; Referee: Ruddy Buquet

1 April 2018 31	Lyon	2–0	Toulouse	Décines-Charpieu
21:00	Depay 23', 43' (pen.); Tousart (yellow card) 69'	Report	Cahuzac (yellow card) 77'	Stadium: Parc Olympique Lyonnais; Attendance: 48,548; Referee: Benoît Bastien

7 April 2018 32	Metz	0–5	Lyon	Metz
17:00	Mollet (yellow card) 32'; Niakhate (yellow card) 59'	Report	Marcelo 1', 21'; Depay 65'; Traoré 68'; Mariano 86'	Stadium: Stade Saint-Symphorien; Attendance: 15,540; Referee: Antony Gautier

14 April 2018 33	Lyon	3–0	Amiens	Décines-Charpieu
17:00	Mariano 30'; Depay 83'; Traoré 85'	Report		Stadium: Parc Olympique Lyonnais; Attendance: 47,513; Referee: Johan Hamel

20 April 2018 34	Dijon	2–5	Lyon	Dijon
21:00	Sliti 26', 55'; Kwon Chang-hoon (yellow card) 37'	Report	Depay 4'; Rafael (yellow card) 31'; Rosier 50' (o.g.); Fekir 53'; Ndombele (yellow card) 70'; Traoré 77'; Cornet 82'	Stadium: Stade Gaston Gérard; Attendance: 15,102; Referee: Frank Schneider

28 April 2018 35	Lyon	2–0	Nantes	Décines-Charpieu
17:00	Depay 40'; Morel (yellow card) 59'; Traoré 69'	Report	El Ghanassy (yellow card) 77'	Stadium: Parc Olympique Lyonnais; Attendance: 50,443; Referee: Antony Gautier

6 May 2018 36	Lyon	3–0	Troyes	Décines-Charpieu
16:30	Tousart (yellow card) 4'; Traoré 28', 35'; Mendy (yellow card) 78'; Cornet 88'	Report	Azamoum (yellow card) 20'; Suk Hyun-jun (yellow card) 81'	Stadium: Parc Olympique Lyonnais; Attendance: 54,274; Referee: Nicolas Rainville

12 May 2018 37	Strasbourg	3–2	Lyon	Strasbourg
21:00	Bahoken (yellow card) 12', (goal) 22'; Martinez (yellow card) 48'; Gonçalves (yellow card) 70'; Mangane (yellow card) 85'; Da Costa 88'; Liénard 90+4'; Oukidja (yellow card) 90+4'	Report	Fekir 50' (pen.); Aouar 73'; Ndombele (yellow card) 83'	Stadium: Stade de la Meinau; Attendance: 25,503; Referee: Clément Turpin

19 May 2018 38	Lyon	3–2	Nice	Décines-Charpieu
21:00	Morel (yellow card) 40'; Depay 48', 65', 86'; Rafael (yellow card) 70'; Ferri (yellow card) 71'	Report	Pléa 18', 89', (yellow card) 70'; Balotelli (yellow card) 20'; Benítez (yellow card) 53'	Stadium: Parc Olympique Lyonnais; Attendance: 56,953; Referee: Benoît Bastien

=== Coupe de France ===
6 January 2018 Round of 64	Nancy	2–3	Lyon	Nancy
21:00	Abergel (yellow card) 26'; Bangoura (yellow card) 51'; Robic 71' (pen.); Muratori (yellow card) 73'; Nordin 75'; Pedretti (yellow card) 85'	Report	Fekir 25'; Marçal (yellow card) 31'; Marcelo 87'; Cornet 90+4'	Stadium: Stade Marcel Picot; Attendance: 14,201; Referee: Antony Gautier

24 January 2018 Round of 32	Monaco	2–3	Lyon	Monaco
21:05	Jovetić 13'; R. Lopes 71'; Tielemans (yellow card) 74'	Report	Ferri (yellow card) 12'; Traoré 21'; Mariano 25', 55'; Tete (yellow card) 73'	Stadium: Stade Louis II; Attendance: 7,143; Referee: Ruddy Buquet

7 February 2018 Round of 16	Montpellier	1–2	Lyon	Montpellier
21:00	Ikoné 22'; Mendes (yellow card) 59'	Report	Cornet 13'; Fekir 27' (pen.); Ferri (yellow card) 57'; Traoré (yellow card) 90+3'	Stadium: Stade de la Mosson; Attendance: 7,000; Referee: Mikael Lesage

1 March 2018 Quarter-finals	Caen	1–0	Lyon	Caen
21:00	Féret (yellow card) 58'; Crivelli (yellow card) 62'; Diomandé 77'; Peeters (yellow card) 86'	Report	Morel (yellow card) 64'; Marçal (yellow card) 76'	Stadium: Stade Michel d'Ornano; Attendance: 17,000; Referee: Antony Gautier

=== Coupe de la Ligue ===
13 December 2017 Round of 16	Montpellier	4–1	Lyon	Montpellier
21:05	Camara 17', 22'; Mukiele (yellow card) 19'; Sambia 45+1', (yellow card) 66'; Bérigaud 86' (pen.)	Report	Maolida 10'; Diop (yellow card) 25'; Diakhaby (yellow card) 37'; Tete (yellow card) 86'	Stadium: Stade de la Mosson; Attendance: 7,447; Referee: Jérôme Brisard

=== UEFA Europa League ===
==== Group stage ====
Pos	Team	Pld	W	D	L	GF	GA	GD	Pts	Qualification	ATA	LYO	EVE	APL
1	(Italy) Atalanta	6	4	2	0	14	4	+10	14	Advance to knockout phase	—	1–0	3–0	3–1
2	(France) Lyon	6	3	2	1	11	4	+7	11	Advance to knockout phase	1–1	—	3–0	4–0
3	(England) Everton	6	1	1	4	7	15	−8	4		1–5	1–2	—	2–2
4	(Cyprus) Apollon Limassol	6	0	3	3	5	14	−9	3		1–1	1–1	0–3	—

Source: UEFA
Rules for classification: Group stage tiebreakers

14 September 2017 1	Apollon Limassol (Cyprus)	1–1	(France) Lyon	Nicosia, Cyprus
19:00 CEST (UTC+02:00)	João Pedro (yellow card) 45+1'; Yuste (yellow card) 75'; Sardinero 90+3'	Report	Marcelo (yellow card) 29'; Depay 53' (pen.); Cornet (yellow card) 72'; Marçal (yellow card) 74'; Morel (yellow card) 88'	Stadium: GSP Stadium; Attendance: 5,134; Referee: Miroslav Zelinka (Czech Republic)

28 September 2017 2	Lyon (France)	1–1	(Italy) Atalanta	Décines-Charpieu, France
21:05 CEST (UTC+02:00)	Traoré 45'; Tete (yellow card) 56'	Report	Cristante (yellow card) 27'; De Roon (yellow card) 38'; Gómez 57'; Iličić (yellow card) 71'	Stadium: Parc Olympique Lyonnais; Attendance: 27,715; Referee: Daniel Siebert (Germany)

19 October 2017 3	Everton (England)	1–2	(France) Lyon	Liverpool, England
21:05 CEST (UTC+02:00)	Lookman (yellow card) 55'; Williams (yellow card) 65', (goal) 69'	Report	Fekir 6' (pen.); Traoré (yellow card) 65', (goal) 75'	Stadium: Goodison Park; Attendance: 27,159; Referee: Bas Nijhuis (Netherlands)

2 November 2017 4	Lyon (France)	3–0	(England) Everton	Décines-Charpieu, France
19:00 CET (UTC+01:00)	Traoré 68'; Aouar 76', (yellow card) 85'; Rafael (yellow card) 78'; Depay 88'	Report	Martina (yellow card) 7'; Schneiderlin (yellow card) 57' (yellow-red card) 80'	Stadium: Parc Olympique Lyonnais; Attendance: 48,103; Referee: Orel Grinfeld (Israel)

23 November 2017 5	Lyon (France)	4–0	(Cyprus) Apollon Limassol	Décines-Charpieu, France
21:05 CET (UTC+01:00)	Diakhaby 29'; Fekir 32', (yellow card) 44'; Mariano 67'; Marçal (yellow card) 70'; Maolida 90'	Report	Jander (yellow card) 29'; Roberge (yellow card) 39'	Stadium: Parc Olympique Lyonnais; Attendance: 26,972; Referee: Paweł Raczkowski (Poland)

7 December 2017 6	Atalanta (Italy)	1–0	(France) Lyon	Reggio Emilia, Italy
19:00 CET (UTC+01:00)	Petagna 10'; Freuler (yellow card) 33'; Toloi (yellow card) 55'	Report		Stadium: Mapei Stadium – Città del Tricolore; Attendance: 14,500; Referee: Aleksei Eskov (Russia)

==== Knockout phase ====
===== Round of 32 =====
15 February 2018 First leg	Lyon (France)	3–1	(Spain) Villarreal	Décines-Charpieu, France
21:05 CET (UTC+01:00)	Ndombele 46'; Fekir 49'; Marçal (yellow card) 73'; Depay 82'	Report	Álvaro (yellow card) 42'; Cheryshev (yellow card) 43'; Fornals 63'; Rodri (yellow card) 90+1'	Stadium: Parc Olympique Lyonnais; Attendance: 46,846; Referee: Viktor Kassai (Hungary)

22 February 2018 Second leg	Villarreal (Spain)	0–1 (1–4 agg.)	(France) Lyon	Villarreal, Spain
19:00 CET (UTC+01:00)	Álvaro (yellow card) 30'; Fuego (yellow card) 59'; Costa (yellow card) 78' (yellow-red card) 78'; Castillejo (yellow card) 89'; Mario (yellow card) 90'	Report	Marcelo (yellow card) 36'; Fekir (yellow card) 38'; Traoré 85'; Depay (yellow card) 89'	Stadium: Estadio de la Cerámica; Attendance: 17,028; Referee: Luca Banti (Italy)

===== Round of 16 =====
8 March 2018 First leg	CSKA Moscow (Russia)	0–1	(France) Lyon	Moscow, Russia
19:00 CET (UTC+01:00)	Nababkin (yellow card) 30'; Natkho (yellow card) 59'	Report	Marcelo 68'; Tousart (yellow card) 88'; Cornet (yellow card) 90+2'	Stadium: VEB Arena; Attendance: 13,990; Referee: Antonio Mateu Lahoz (Spain)

15 March 2018 Second leg	Lyon (France)	2–3 (3–3 (a) agg.)	(Russia) CSKA Moscow	Décines-Charpieu, France
21:05 CET (UTC+01:00)	Cornet 58'; Mariano 71', (yellow card) 78'	Report	Nababkin (yellow card) 14'; Musa (yellow card) 36', (goal) 60'; Golovin 39'; Wernbloom 65'	Stadium: Parc Olympique Lyonnais; Attendance: 38,622; Referee: Bobby Madden (Scotland)

== Statistics ==
=== Appearances and goals ===
No.	Pos	Nat	Player	Total		Ligue 1		Coupe de France		Coupe de la Ligue		UEFA Europa League	
No.	Pos	Nat	Player	Apps	Goals	Apps	Goals	Apps	Goals	Apps	Goals	Apps	Goals
Goalkeepers
1	GK	(Portugal) POR	Anthony Lopes	48	0	34	0	4	0	0	0	10	0
16	GK	(Switzerland) SUI	Anthony Racioppi	0	0	0	0	0	0	0	0	0	0
30	GK	(France) FRA	Mathieu Gorgelin	5	0	4	0	0	0	1	0	0	0
Defenders
2	DF	(France) FRA	Mapou Yanga-Mbiwa	3	0	1+1	0	0	0	1	0	0	0
4	DF	(Brazil) BRA	Rafael	31	1	22+2	1	0+1	0	0	0	6	0
5	DF	(France) FRA	Mouctar Diakhaby	21	2	8+4	1	3	0	1	0	5	1
6	DF	(Brazil) BRA	Marcelo	49	6	35	4	4	1	0	0	10	1
15	DF	(France) FRA	Jérémy Morel	41	0	32+1	0	1+1	0	0	0	6	0
20	DF	(Brazil) BRA	Marçal	28	0	14+4	0	4	0	0	0	6	0
22	DF	(France) FRA	Ferland Mendy	35	0	24+3	0	0	0	1	0	4+3	0
23	DF	(Netherlands) NED	Kenny Tete	31	1	16+6	1	4	0	1	0	4	0
31	DF	(France) FRA	Louis Nganioni	0	0	0	0	0	0	0	0	0	0
Midfielders
8	MF	(France) FRA	Houssem Aouar	44	7	27+5	6	2+2	0	0	0	4+4	1
12	MF	(France) FRA	Jordan Ferri	34	0	4+20	0	3	0	1	0	3+3	0
24	MF	(Spain) ESP	Pape Cheikh Diop	2	0	0+1	0	0	0	1	0	0	0
28	MF	(France) FRA	Tanguy Ndombele	47	1	28+4	0	1+3	0	1	0	8+2	1
29	MF	(France) FRA	Lucas Tousart	50	0	37	0	4	0	0	0	8+1	0
Forwards
9	FW	(Dominican Republic) DOM	Mariano	45	21	30+4	18	1+1	1	0	0	8+1	2
10	FW	(Burkina Faso) BFA	Bertrand Traoré	43	18	27+4	13	2+1	1	0	0	7+2	4
11	FW	(Netherlands) NED	Memphis Depay	51	22	28+8	19	4	0	1	0	8+2	3
13	FW	(France) FRA	Willem Geubbels	4	0	0+2	0	0	0	0+1	0	0+1	0
17	FW	(France) FRA	Myziane Maolida	22	3	2+11	1	1+1	0	1	1	1+5	1
18	FW	(France) FRA	Nabil Fekir	40	23	28+2	18	2	2	0	0	8	3
19	FW	(France) FRA	Amine Gouiri	10	0	0+7	0	1	0	0+1	0	0+1	0
27	FW	(Ivory Coast) CIV	Maxwel Cornet	43	7	13+17	4	3+1	2	1	0	4+4	1
Players transferred out during the season
14	MF	(Spain) ESP	Sergi Darder	3	0	3	0	0	0	0	0	0	0
25	MF	(Luxembourg) LUX	Christopher Martins	2	0	1+1	0	0	0	0	0	0	0
7	MF	(France) FRA	Clément Grenier	2	0	0+1	0	0	0	0+1	0	0	0

Last updated: 19 May 2018
Source: Competitions

== Goalscorers ==
As of matches played till 20 May 2018

Place	Position	Nation	Number	Name	Ligue 1	Coupe de France	Coupe de la Ligue	UEFA Europa League	Total
1	FW	(France)	18	Nabil Fekir	18	2	0	3	23
2	FW	(Netherlands)	11	Memphis Depay	19	0	0	3	22
3	FW	(Dominican Republic)	9	Mariano	18	1	0	2	21
4	FW	(Burkina Faso)	10	Bertrand Traoré	13	1	0	4	18
5	MF	(France)	8	Houssem Aouar	6	0	0	1	7
5	FW	(Ivory Coast)	27	Maxwel Cornet	4	2	0	1	7
7	DF	(Brazil)	6	Marcelo	3	1	0	1	5
8	FW	(France)	17	Myziane Maolida	1	0	1	1	3
9	DF	(France)	5	Mouctar Diakhaby	1	0	0	1	2
10	MF	(France)	28	Tanguy Ndombele	0	0	0	1	1
10	DF	(Netherlands)	23	Kenny Tete	1	0	0	0	1
10	DF	(Brazil)	4	Rafael	1	0	0	0	1
				TOTALS	85	7	1	18	111

== Kit ==
Kit used at Angers.

In Ligue 1 match at Angers, Lyon wore their away kit from 2015–16 season. Their third kit was released on late November 2017.
