= 2018–19 Olympique Lyonnais season =

Lyon
2018–19 season
- Owner: OL Groupe
- Chairman: Jean-Michel Aulas
- Manager: Bruno Génésio
- Stadium: Parc Olympique Lyonnais
- Ligue 1: 3rd
- Coupe de France: Semi-finals
- Coupe de la Ligue: Quarter-finals
- UEFA Champions League: Round of 16
- Top goalscorer: League: Moussa Dembélé (15); All: Moussa Dembélé (20)
- Highest home attendance: All: 57,889 v. Barcelona (19 Feb 2019, UEFA CL); League: 57,624 v. PSG (3 February 2019)
- Lowest home attendance: League: 40,305 v. Guingamp (15 February 2019); All: 21,721 v. Strasbourg (8 January 2019, CdlL QF)
- Average home league attendance: 49,079 (82.9% of capacity)
- Biggest win: +4 goals (twice); 5–1 v. Toulouse (3 March 2019); 4–0 v. Caen (18 May 2019)
- Biggest defeat: 0–5 v. PSG (7 October 2018)
Home colours	Away colours	Third colours

The 2018–19 season was Olympique Lyonnais's 69th professional season since its establishment in 1950. The side competed in Ligue 1, Coupe de France, Coupe de la Ligue and UEFA Champions League.

== Players ==
=== Squad information ===
As of 31 August 2018

Note: Flags indicate national team as defined under FIFA eligibility rules; some limited exceptions apply. Players may hold more than one non-FIFA nationality.

No.	Pos.	Nation	Player
1	GK	POR	Anthony Lopes
2	DF	FRA	Mapou Yanga-Mbiwa
4	DF	BRA	Rafael
5	DF	BEL	Jason Denayer
6	DF	BRA	Marcelo
7	FW	FRA	Martin Terrier
8	MF	FRA	Houssem Aouar
9	FW	FRA	Moussa Dembélé
10	FW	BFA	Bertrand Traoré
11	FW	NED	Memphis Depay
12	MF	FRA	Jordan Ferri
14	DF	FRA	Léo Dubois
15	DF	MAD	Jérémy Morel

No.	Pos.	Nation	Player
16	GK	SUI	Anthony Racioppi
18	FW	FRA	Nabil Fekir (Captain)
19	FW	FRA	Amine Gouiri
20	DF	BRA	Marçal
22	DF	FRA	Ferland Mendy
23	DF	NED	Kenny Tete
24	MF	ESP	Pape Cheikh Diop
26	DF	FRA	Oumar Solet
27	FW	CIV	Maxwel Cornet
28	MF	FRA	Tanguy Ndombele
29	MF	FRA	Lucas Tousart
30	GK	FRA	Mathieu Gorgelin

=== Out on loan ===
Note: Flags indicate national team as defined under FIFA eligibility rules; some limited exceptions apply. Players may hold more than one non-FIFA nationality.

No.	Pos.	Nation	Player
25	MF	LUX	Christopher Martins (on loan to Troyes until 30 June 2019)
—	MF	FRA	Timothé Cognat (on loan to Servette until 30 June 2019)
—	MF	FRA	Elisha Owusu (on loan to Sochaux until 30 June 2019)

== Transfers ==
In:

No.	Pos.	Nation	Player
7	FW	FRA	Martin Terrier (end of loan to Strasbourg)
14	DF	FRA	Léo Dubois (from Nantes)
26	DF	FRA	Oumar Solet (from Laval, previously on loan)
28	MF	FRA	Tanguy Ndombele (from Amiens, previously on loan)
—	FW	ENG	Reo Griffiths (from (England) Tottenham Hotspur)
9	FW	FRA	Moussa Dembélé (from (Scotland) Celtic)
5	DF	BEL	Jason Denayer (from (England) Manchester City)

Out:

No.	Pos.	Nation	Player
5	DF	FRA	Mouctar Diakhaby (to (Spain) Valencia)
9	FW	DOM	Mariano (to (Spain) Real Madrid)
17	FW	FRA	Myziane Maolida (to Nice)
25	MF	LUX	Christopher Martins (on loan to (France) Troyes, previously on loan)
—	DF	CMR	Nicolas N'Koulou (to (Italy) Torino, previously on loan)
—	MF	FRA	Timothé Cognat (on loan to (Switzerland) Servette FC)
—	MF	FRA	Elisha Owusu (on loan to Sochaux)
—	MF	ESP	Sergi Darder (to (Spain) Espanyol, previously on loan)
—	MF	FRA	Romain Del Castillo (to Rennes, previously on loan at Nîmes)
—	FW	FRA	Jean-Philippe Mateta (to (Germany) Mainz, previously on loan at Le Havre)
—	FW	FRA	Aldo Kalulu (to (Switzerland) Basel, previously on loan at Sochaux)
—	FW	FRA	Willem Geubbels (to Monaco)

== Pre-season and friendlies ==
=== Friendlies ===
13 July 2018	Sion (Switzerland)	2–2	(France) Lyon	Savièse, Switzerland
19:00 CEST (UTC+2)	Adryan 29'; Grgić 89' (pen.)	Report	Terrier 42'; Mendy 49'	Stadium: Stade St.-Germain; Attendance: 1,850; Referee: Alain Bieri (Switzerland)

21 July 2018	Lyon (France)	4–0	(England) Fulham	Bourgoin-Jallieu, France
22:00 CEST (UTC+2)	Terrier 64', 84'; Mariano 73' (pen.); Cornet 78'	Report	Seri (yellow card) 29'; Johansen (yellow card) 67'	Stadium: Stade Pierre Rajon; Referee: Willy Delajod (France)

25 July 2018	Huddersfield Town (England)	3–1	(France) Lyon	Huddersfield, England
20:45 BST (UTC+1)	Kongolo 68'; Depoitre 80', 90'	Report	Cornet 50'	Stadium: John Smith's Stadium; Referee: Anthony Taylor (England)

28 July 2018	Lyon (France)	2–1	(Germany) VfL Wolfsburg	Bourg-en-Bresse, France
19:00 CEST (UTC+2)	Traoré 17'; Mendy (yellow card) 26'; Terrier 36'; Ferri (yellow card) 45+2'	Report	Brekalo (yellow card) 45'; Camacho (yellow card) 45+2'; Guilavogui (yellow card) 47'; Arnold 67'	Stadium: Stade Marcel-Verchère; Referee: Jérôme Miguelgorry (France)

=== International Champions Cup ===
1 August 2018 ICC / Eusébio Cup	Benfica (Portugal)	2–3	(France) Lyon	Faro and Loulé, Portugal
21:05 WEST (UTC+1)	Pizzi 59'; Marcelo 64' (o.g.)	Report	Depay (yellow card) 24'; Marcelo 41'; Traoré 45'; Terrier 83'	Stadium: Estádio Algarve; Attendance: 17,510; Referee: Hélder Malheiro (Portugal)

4 August 2018 ICC	Internazionale (Italy)	1–0	(France) Lyon	Lecce, Italy
20:05 CEST (UTC+2)	Martínez 52', (yellow card) 63'; Ranocchia (yellow card) 72'	Report	Diop (yellow card) 39'; Martins (yellow card) 43'; Ferri (yellow card) 55'	Stadium: Stadio Via del Mare; Attendance: 24,698; Referee: Marco Di Bello (Italy)

7 August 2018 ICC	Chelsea (England)	0–0 (5–4 p)	(France) Lyon	London, England
20:05 BST (UTC+1)		Report		Stadium: Stamford Bridge; Attendance: 18,457; Referee: Paul Tierney (England)
	Penalties
	Jorginho (penalty scored); Barkley (penalty scored); Alonso (penalty scored); Azpilicueta (penalty scored); Hazard (penalty scored)		(penalty scored) Ferri; (penalty scored) Marcelo; (penalty scored) Gouiri; (penalty scored) Tete; (penalty missed) Cheikh

== Competitions ==
=== Ligue 1 ===
==== League table ====
Pos	Team	Pld	W	D	L	GF	GA	GD	Pts	Qualification or relegation
1	Paris Saint-Germain (C)	38	29	4	5	105	35	+70	91	Qualification to Champions League group stage
2	Lille	38	22	9	7	68	33	+35	75	Qualification to Champions League group stage
3	Lyon	38	21	9	8	70	47	+23	72	Qualification to Champions League group stage
4	Saint-Étienne	38	19	9	10	59	41	+18	66	Qualification to Europa League group stage
5	Marseille	38	18	7	13	60	52	+8	61	

Source: Ligue 1 and Soccerway
Rules for classification: 1) Points; 2) Goal difference; 3) Head-to-head points; 4) Head-to-head goal difference; 5) Head-to-head goals scored; 6) Head-to-head away goals scored; 7) Goals scored; 8) Away goals scored; 9) Most goals scored in single league match; 10) Fairplay ranking.
(C) Champions

==== Results summary ====
Overall								Home						Away					
Pld	W	D	L	GF	GA	GD	Pts	W	D	L	GF	GA	GD	W	D	L	GF	GA	GD
38	21	9	8	70	47	+23	72	12	4	3	38	19	+19	9	5	5	32	28	+4

Last updated: 24 May 2019.
Source: Competitive matches

==== Results by round ====
Round	1	2	3	4	5	6	7	8	9	10	11	12	13	14	15	16	17	18	19	20	21	22	23	24	25	26	27	28	29	30	31	32	33	34	35	36	37	38
Ground	H	A	H	H	A	H	A	H	A	H	A	H	A	H	A	H	A	H	A	H	A	A	H	A	H	A	H	A	H	A	H	A	H	A	H	A	H	A
Result	W	L	W	L	D	W	W	D	L	W	W	D	W	W	D	L	D	W	D	D	W	W	W	L	W	L	W	D	W	W	L	L	W	W	D	W	W	W
Position	5	10	4	8	7	6	2	5	6	5	4	4	4	2	3	4	4	3	3	3	3	3	3	3	3	3	3	3	3	3	3	3	3	3	3	3	3	3

Source: Ligue1
A = Away; H = Home; W = Win; D = Draw; L = Loss

==== Matches ====
12 August 2018 1	Lyon	2–0	Amiens	Décines-Charpieu
15:00 CEST (UTC+2)	B. Traoré 24'; Depay 75'	Report	G. Traoré (yellow card) 42'; Gnahoré (yellow card) 84'	Stadium: Parc Olympique Lyonnais; Attendance: 48,263; Referee: Frank Schneider

17 August 2018 2	Reims	1–0	Lyon	Reims
20:45 CEST (UTC+2)	Chavarría 32'; Chavalerin (yellow card) 84'; Suk Hyun-jun (yellow card) 90+1'	Report		Stadium: Stade Auguste Delaune; Attendance: 18,917; Referee: Ruddy Buquet

24 August 2018 3	Lyon	2–0	Strasbourg	Décines-Charpieu
20:45 CEST (UTC+2)	Mendy (yellow card) 10'; Terrier 42'; Traoré 64'	Report	Sissoko (yellow card) 15'; Thomasson (yellow card) 45'	Stadium: Parc Olympique Lyonnais; Attendance: 47,341; Referee: Amaury Delerue

31 August 2018 4	Lyon	0–1	Nice	Décines-Charpieu
20:45 CEST (UTC+2)		Report	Tameze (yellow card) 41'; Balotelli (yellow card) 42'; Saint-Maximin 51'	Stadium: Parc Olympique Lyonnais; Attendance: 53,438; Referee: François Letexier

15 September 2018 5	Caen	2–2	Lyon	Caen
17:00 CEST (UTC+2)	Fajr (yellow card) 30'; Beauvue 52' (pen.); Djiku (red card) 55'; Oniangué 73'; Sankoh (red card) 90+4'	Report	Mendy (yellow card) 19', (goal) 88'; Fekir 45'; Rafael (yellow card) 86'	Stadium: Stade Michel d'Ornano; Attendance: 17,676; Referee: Johan Hamel

23 September 2018 6	Lyon	4–2	Marseille	Décines-Charpieu
21:00 CEST (UTC+2)	Aouar 28'; Diop (yellow card) 29'; Traoré 51', 60'; Fekir 74' (pen.)	Report	Strootman (yellow card) 35'; Thauvin 39'; Luiz Gustavo (yellow card) 66'; N'Jie 82'; Ćaleta-Car (red card) 83'	Stadium: Parc Olympique Lyonnais; Attendance: 57,287; Referee: Clément Turpin

26 September 2018 7	Dijon	0–3	Lyon	Dijon
19:00 CEST (UTC+2)	Loiodice (yellow card) 56' (yellow-red card) 90+3'	Report	Dembélé 16', 19'; Terrier 35'; Tousart (yellow card) 59' (yellow-red card) 67'	Stadium: Stade Gaston Gérard; Attendance: 14,651; Referee: Jérôme Miguelgorry

29 September 2018 8	Lyon	1–1	Nantes	Décines-Charpieu
20:00 CEST (UTC+2)	Aouar 22'; Morel (yellow card) 29'; Diop (yellow card) 34'; Fekir (yellow card) 87'	Report	Lucas Lima (yellow card) 16'; Boschilia 62'; Tătărușanu (yellow card) 75'; Miazga (yellow card) 78'; Fàbio (yellow card) 90+2'	Stadium: Parc Olympique Lyonnais; Attendance: 50,319; Referee: Frank Schneider

7 October 2018 9	Paris Saint-Germain	5–0	Lyon	Paris
21:00 CEST (UTC+2)	Neymar 9' (pen.), (yellow card) 38'; Kimpembe (red card) 32'; Verratti (yellow card) 44'; Mbappé 61', 66', 69', 74'	Report	Tousart (yellow card) 26' (yellow-red card) 45'; Aouar (yellow card) 59'; Morel (yellow card) 64'	Stadium: Parc des Princes; Attendance: 47,443; Referee: Antony Gautier

19 October 2018 10	Lyon	2–0	Nîmes	Décines-Charpieu
20:45 CEST (UTC+2)	Dembélé 24'; Diop (yellow card) 34'; Depay 90'	Report	Harek (yellow card) 17'; Briançon (yellow card) 32'	Stadium: Parc Olympique Lyonnais; Attendance: 42,896; Referee: Olivier Thual

27 October 2018 11	Angers	1–2	Lyon	Angers
17:00 CEST (UTC+2)	I. Traoré (red card) 34'; Pavlović (yellow card) 39'; López (yellow card) 85', (goal) 89'	Report	Marcelo (yellow card) 13'; Ndombele (yellow card) 58'; Aouar 63'; Marçal (yellow card) 73'; B. Traoré (yellow card) 81'; Depay 87'; Rafael (yellow card) 90+3'	Stadium: Stade Raymond Kopa; Attendance: 14,186; Referee: Ruddy Buquet

3 November 2018 12	Lyon	1–1	Bordeaux	Décines-Charpieu
17:00 CET (UTC+1)	Aouar 45'; Traoré (yellow card) 68'	Report	Cornelius 73'; Palencia (yellow card) 80'	Stadium: Parc Olympique Lyonnais; Attendance: 46,653; Referee: Benoît Millot

10 November 2018 13	Guingamp	2–4	Lyon	Guingamp
17:00 CET (UTC+1)	Thuram 22', 78' (pen.); Blas (yellow card) 69'	Report	Aouar 63'; Depay 67', 73', (yellow card) 75'; Morel (yellow card) 77'; Cornet 84'	Stadium: Stade de Roudourou; Attendance: 14,171; Referee: Mikael Lesage

23 November 2018 14	Lyon	1–0	Saint-Étienne	Décines-Charpieu
20:45 CET (UTC+1)	Denayer (yellow card) 42', (goal) 62'; Rafael (red card) 72'	Report	Monnet-Paquet (yellow card) 39'; Kolodziejczak (yellow card) 89'	Stadium: Parc Olympique Lyonnais; Attendance: 55,701; Referee: Antony Gautier

1 December 2018 15	Lille	2–2	Lyon	Villeneuve-d'Ascq
17:00 CET (UTC+1)	Rémy 17'; Pépé 28'; Bamba (yellow card) 41'; Mendes (yellow card) 42'	Report	Depay (yellow card) 40'; Traoré 63'; Dembélé 86'	Stadium: Stade Pierre-Mauroy; Attendance: 38,755; Referee: Benoît Bastien

5 December 2018 16	Lyon	0–2	Rennes	Décines-Charpieu
19:00 CET (UTC+1)	Marcelo (yellow card) 61'	Report	Ben Arfa 41'; Siebatcheu 43'	Stadium: Parc Olympique Lyonnais; Attendance: 47,278; Referee: Johan Hamel

16 December 2018 18	Lyon	3–0	Monaco	Décines-Charpieu
21:00 CET (UTC+1)	Aouar 6'; Fekir 34'; Depay (yellow card) 46'; Mendy 59'	Report	Falcao (yellow card) 46'; Golovin (red card) 47'; Raggi (yellow card) 48'	Stadium: Parc Olympique Lyonnais; Attendance: 46,474; Referee: Clément Turpin

22 December 2018 19	Montpellier	1–1	Lyon	Montpellier
21:00 CET (UTC+1)	Mendes (yellow card) 55'; Aguilar (yellow card) 60', (goal) 81'	Report	Fekir 67', (yellow card) 72'	Stadium: Stade de la Mosson; Attendance: 17,275; Referee: François Letexier

11 January 2019 20	Lyon	1–1	Reims	Décines-Charpieu
21:00 CET (UTC+1)	Traoré 70'	Report	Chavarría 34'; Foket (yellow card) 83'	Stadium: Parc Olympique Lyonnais; Attendance: 42,512; Referee: Benoît Millot

16 January 2019 17	Toulouse	2–2	Lyon	Toulouse
19:00 CET (UTC+1)	Durmaz 12', 74' (pen.); Cahuzac (yellow card) 45+1'; Moubandje (yellow card) 53'; Jullien (yellow card) 86'; Moreira (yellow card) 90+5'	Report	Solet (yellow card) 10'; Depay (yellow card) 45+1'; Dembélé 76'; Morel (yellow card) 78'; Fekir 88'	Stadium: Stadium Municipal; Attendance: 16,587; Referee: Ruddy Buquet
Note: The match, originally scheduled for 8 December 2018, was postponed due to security concerns as a result of the yellow vests movement.

20 January 2019 21	Saint-Étienne	1–2	Lyon	Saint-Étienne
21:00 CET (UTC+1)	Hamouma 21'; Monnet-Paquet (yellow card) 43'; Perrin (yellow card) 65'	Report	Marcelo (yellow card) 20'; Fekir 65' (pen.); Tete (yellow card) 71'; Dembélé 90+5'	Stadium: Stade Geoffroy-Guichard; Attendance: 41,594; Referee: Benoît Bastien

27 January 2019 22	Amiens	0–1	Lyon	Amiens
17:00 CET (UTC+1)	Dibassy (yellow card) 86'	Report	Denayer 50'; Ndombele (yellow card) 73'; Dubois (yellow card) 76'; Dembélé (yellow card) 90+3'	Stadium: Stade de la Licorne; Attendance: 10,017; Referee: Jérôme Miguelgorry

3 February 2019 23	Lyon	2–1	Paris Saint-Germain	Décines-Charpieu
21:00 CET (UTC+1)	Dembélé 33'; Fekir 49' (pen.), (yellow card) 90+1'	Report	Di María 7'; Kimpembe (yellow card) 27'; Draxler (yellow card) 89'	Stadium: Parc Olympique Lyonnais; Attendance: 57,624; Referee: Clément Turpin

10 February 2019 24	Nice	1–0	Lyon	Nice
21:00 CET (UTC+1)	Maolida (yellow card) 48'; Dante (yellow card) 49'; Walter 69' (pen.)	Report	Fekir (yellow card) 9'; Marcelo (yellow card) 86'	Stadium: Allianz Riviera; Attendance: 22,193; Referee: Mikael Lesage

15 February 2019 25	Lyon	2–1	Guingamp	Décines-Charpieu
20:45 CET (UTC+1)	Terrier 15'; Marçal (yellow card) 28'; Fekir 35'; Traoré (yellow card) 67'	Report	Eboa Eboa 21', (yellow card) 84'	Stadium: Parc Olympique Lyonnais; Attendance: 40,305; Referee: Antony Gautier

24 February 2019 26	Monaco	2–0	Lyon	Fontvieille, Monaco
21:00 CET (UTC+1)	Martins 18'; R. Lopes 27'; Sidibé (yellow card) 52'; Glik (yellow card) 70'; Falcao (yellow card) 90+3'	Report	Terrier (yellow card) 29'	Stadium: Stade Louis II; Attendance: 10,157; Referee: Benoît Millot

3 March 2019 27	Lyon	5–1	Toulouse	Décines-Charpieu
17:00 CET (UTC+1)	Depay 10'; Traoré 30'; Fekir 35' (pen.); Dembélé 67', 71'	Report	Dossevi 15'; Jullien (yellow card) 45'; Cahuzac (yellow card) 56', (red card) 83'	Stadium: Parc Olympique Lyonnais; Attendance: 44,881; Referee: Thomas Leonard

9 March 2019 28	Strasbourg	2–2	Lyon	Strasbourg
17:00 CET (UTC+1)	Ajorque 69', 70'; Martinez (yellow card) 80'	Report	Dembélé 3', 51' (pen.); Cornet (yellow card) 8'; Tousart (yellow card) 90+1'	Stadium: Stade de la Meinau; Attendance: 25,463; Referee: Jérôme Miguelgorry

17 March 2019 29	Lyon	3–2	Montpellier	Décines-Charpieu
14:30 CET (UTC+1)	Terrier 12'; Dembélé 58'; Rafael (yellow card) 62'; Aouar 86'	Report	Delort (yellow card) 24'; Mollet 36'; Lasne (yellow card) 81'; Camara 90+1'	Stadium: Parc Olympique Lyonnais; Attendance: 47,134; Referee: Clément Turpin

29 March 2019 30	Rennes	0–1	Lyon	Rennes
20:45 CET (UTC+1)	Hunou (yellow card) 45+1'; Zeffane (yellow card) 82'	Report	Marcelo (yellow card) 78'; Aouar (yellow card) 83'; Terrier 86'; Ndombele (yellow card) 90+2'	Stadium: Roazhon Park; Attendance: 27,094; Referee: Antony Gautier

6 April 2019 31	Lyon	1–3	Dijon	Décines-Charpieu
17:00 CEST (UTC+2)	Terrier 1'; Depay (yellow card) 87'	Report	Saïd 3'; Marcelo 7' (o.g.); Rafael 65' (o.g.); Lautoa (yellow card) 79'; Marié (yellow card) 90'	Stadium: Parc Olympique Lyonnais; Attendance: 52,431; Referee: Johan Hamel

12 April 2019 32	Nantes	2–1	Lyon	Nantes
20:45 CEST (UTC+2)	Coulibaly 11', (yellow card) 78'; Rongier (yellow card) 16'; Limbombe 83'	Report	Terrier 41'; Denayer (yellow card) 78'	Stadium: Stade de la Beaujoire; Attendance: 25,050; Referee: Jérôme Brisard

19 April 2019 33	Lyon	2–1	Angers	Décines-Charpieu
20:45 CEST (UTC+2)	Depay 14'; Terrier 39'	Report	Mangani (yellow card) 58'; Kanga (yellow card) 64'; Tousart 89' (o.g.)	Stadium: Parc Olympique Lyonnais; Attendance: 43,917; Referee: Benoît Millot

26 April 2019 34	Bordeaux	2–3	Lyon	Bordeaux
20:45 CEST (UTC+2)	Briand 34'; De Préville 38', (yellow card) 44'; Otávio (yellow card) 61'; Jovanović (red card) 73'; Palencia (yellow card) 90+2'	Report	Depay 14'; Cornet 67'; Dubois (yellow card) 77'; Dembélé 85'; Fekir (yellow card) 88'; Traoré (yellow card) 90+4'	Stadium: Matmut Atlantique; Attendance: 27,455; Referee: Benoît Bastien

5 May 2019 35	Lyon	2–2	Lille	Décines-Charpieu
21:00 CEST (UTC+2)	Terrier 11'; Dubois 74'	Report	Thiago Maia (yellow card) 44'; Rémy 50'; Soumaré 69'; Bamba (yellow card) 73'	Stadium: Parc Olympique Lyonnais; Attendance: 56,642; Referee: Clément Turpin

12 May 2019 36	Marseille	0–3	Lyon	Marseille
21:00 CEST (UTC+2)	Balotelli (yellow card) 31'; Amavi (yellow card) 34'; Ćaleta-Car (red card) 67'; Strootman (yellow card) 86'	Report	Terrier (yellow card) 21'; Cornet 24', 86'; Dembélé 84'	Stadium: Stade Vélodrome; Attendance: 61,926; Referee: Ruddy Buquet

18 May 2019 37	Lyon	4–0	Caen	Décines-Charpieu
21:00 CEST (UTC+2)	Cornet (yellow card) 25', (goal) 54'; Marcelo (yellow card) 41'; Depay 50', 74'; Dembélé 64'; Rafael (yellow card) 84'	Report	Djiku (yellow card) 90+2'	Stadium: Parc Olympique Lyonnais; Attendance: 51,408; Referee: Amaury Delerue

24 May 2019 38	Nîmes	2–3	Lyon	Nîmes
21:05 CEST (UTC+2)	Ripart 11'; Bobichon 45+3'; Paquiez (yellow card) 61'	Report	Cornet 6', 89'; Ndombele 90+1'; Traoré (yellow card) 90+4'	Stadium: Stade des Costières; Attendance: 14,986; Referee: François Letexier

=== Coupe de France ===
5 January 2019 Round of 64	Bourges Foot	0–2	Lyon	Bourges
20:55 CET (UTC+1)	Cissé (yellow card) 7'; Afatoughe (yellow card) 11'; Keita (yellow card) 31'; Bandu Fila (yellow card) 64'	Report	Marçal (yellow card) 26'; Solet (yellow card) 42'; Terrier 59'; Mendy 77'	Stadium: Stade Jacques Rimbault; Attendance: 8,187; Referee: Nicolas Rainville

24 January 2019 Round of 32	Amiens	0–2	Lyon	Amiens
21:00 CET (UTC+1)	Adénon (yellow card) 20'; Sy (yellow card) 36'; Gnahoré (yellow card) 52'	Report	Dembélé 28'; Dubois 35'; Marçal (red card) 45+2'	Stadium: Stade de la Licorne; Attendance: 6,647; Referee: Jérôme Brisard

7 February 2019 Round of 16	Guingamp	1–2	Lyon	Guingamp
21:00 CET (UTC+1)	Eboa Eboa (yellow card) 26'; A. Mendy 88'	Report	Dembélé 7'; Tete (yellow card) 46'; Cornet 49'; Tousart (yellow card) 90+4'	Stadium: Stade de Roudourou; Attendance: 8,768; Referee: Frank Schneider

27 February 2019 Quarter-finals	Lyon	3–1	Caen	Décines-Charpieu
21:00 CET (UTC+1)	Denayer 26'; Cornet 49'; Dembélé (yellow card) 73'; Marcelo (yellow card) 77'; Depay 84'	Report	Mbengue (yellow card) 13'; Gradit (yellow card) 40'; Tchokounté (yellow card) 70'; Ninga 78'; Djiku (red card) 82'; Fajr (yellow card) 83'	Stadium: Parc Olympique Lyonnais; Attendance: 27,493; Referee: Ruddy Buquet

2 April 2019 Semi-finals	Lyon	2–3	Rennes	Décines-Charpieu
21:10 CEST (UTC+2)	Traoré 47'; Dubois (yellow card) 66'; Dembélé 75' (pen.)	Report	Niang 40'; Mexer (yellow card) 53'; André 55'; Ben Arfa (yellow card) 69'; Grenier (yellow card) 75'; Bensebaini 81'	Stadium: Parc Olympique Lyonnais; Attendance: 47,195; Referee: Benoît Bastien

=== Coupe de la Ligue ===
19 December 2018 Round of 16	Amiens	2–3	Lyon	Amiens
18:45 CET (UTC+1)	Adénon (yellow card) 19' (yellow-red card) 26'; Kurzawa (yellow card) 32'; Otero (yellow card) 39'; Denayer 70' (o.g.); Timité 90+1'; Blin (yellow card) 90+2'	Report	Dembélé 20' (pen.); Marçal (yellow card) 39'; Terrier (yellow card) 42', (goal) 60'; Traoré 45+2'	Stadium: Stade de la Licorne; Attendance: 7,327; Referee: Karim Abed

8 January 2019 Quarter-finals	Lyon	1–2	Strasbourg	Lyon
21:00 CET (UTC+1)	Traoré 49'	Report	Ajorque 26' (pen.); Caci (yellow card) 39'; Koné 52'; Thomasson (yellow card) 74'	Stadium: Parc Olympique Lyonnais; Attendance: 21,721; Referee: Clément Turpin

=== UEFA Champions League ===
Win Draw Loss

On 30 August, Lyon were drawn in Group F of the Champions League alongside Manchester City, Shakhtar Donetsk, and Hoffenheim.

==== Group stage ====
Pos	Team	Pld	W	D	L	GF	GA	GD	Pts	Qualification	MCI	LYO	SHK	HOF
1	(England) Manchester City	6	4	1	1	16	6	+10	13	Advance to knockout phase	—	1–2	6–0	2–1
2	(France) Lyon	6	1	5	0	12	11	+1	8	Advance to knockout phase	2–2	—	2–2	2–2
3	(Ukraine) Shakhtar Donetsk	6	1	3	2	8	16	−8	6	Transfer to Europa League	0–3	1–1	—	2–2
4	(Germany) TSG Hoffenheim	6	0	3	3	11	14	−3	3		1–2	3–3	2–3	—

Source: UEFA

19 September 2018 1	Manchester City (England)	1–2	(France) Lyon	Manchester, England
21:00 CEST (UTC+2)	B. Silva 67'; Agüero (yellow card) 90+1'	Report	Cornet 26'; Fekir 43', (yellow card) 77'; Traoré (yellow card) 90+3'	Stadium: City of Manchester Stadium; Attendance: 40,111; Referee: Daniele Orsato (Italy)

2 October 2018 2	Lyon (France)	2–2	(Ukraine) Shakhtar Donetsk	Décines-Charpieu, France
21:00 CEST (UTC+2)	Fekir (yellow card) 46'; Dembélé 70'; Dubois 72'	Report	Júnior Moraes 44', 55'	Stadium: Parc Olympique Lyonnais; Attendance: 0 Referee: Andris Treimanis (Latvia)
Note: The Lyon v Shakhtar Donetsk match was played behind closed doors due to punishment by UEFA.

23 October 2018 3	1899 Hoffenheim (Germany)	3–3	(France) Lyon	Sinsheim, Germany
21:00 CEST (UTC+2)	Kramarić 33', 47'; Joelinton 90+2'; Demirbay (yellow card) 90+4'	Report	Traoré 27'; Ndombele 59'; Depay 67'; Tete (yellow card) 86'	Stadium: Rhein-Neckar-Arena; Attendance: 24,144; Referee: Alberto Undiano Mallenco (Spain)

7 November 2018 4	Lyon (France)	2–2	(Germany) 1899 Hoffenheim	Décines-Charpieu, France
21:00 CET (UTC+1)	Denayer (yellow card) 6'; Fekir 19'; Ndombele 28'; Morel (yellow card) 90+1'	Report	Kasim (yellow card) 19' (yellow-red card) 51'; Grillitsch (yellow card) 43'; Bičakčić (yellow card) 48'; Kramarić 65'; Vogt (yellow card) 72'; Joelinton (yellow card) 72'; Kadeřábek 90+2'	Stadium: Parc Olympique Lyonnais; Attendance: 53,850; Referee: Danny Makkelie (Netherlands)

27 November 2018 5	Lyon (France)	2–2	(England) Manchester City	Décines-Charpieu, France
21:00 CET (UTC+1)	Cornet 55', 81'; F. Mendy (yellow card) 62'	Report	Fernandinho (yellow card) 23'; Sterling (yellow card) 34'; Laporte 62'; Agüero 83'	Stadium: Parc Olympique Lyonnais; Attendance: 56,039; Referee: Gianluca Rocchi (Italy)

12 December 2018 6	Shakhtar Donetsk (Ukraine)	1–1	(France) Lyon	Kyiv, Ukraine
21:00 CET (UTC+1)	Júnior Moraes 22'; Bolbat (yellow card) 87'	Report	Marçal (yellow card) 8'; Fekir 65', (yellow card) 68'	Stadium: NSC Olimpiyskiy Stadium; Attendance: 38,916; Referee: Björn Kuipers (Netherlands)
Note: Shakhtar Donetsk played their final group stage home match at the Olimpiyskiy National Sports Complex in Kyiv, instead of their temporary stadium Metalist Stadium, Kharkiv, due to martial law being declared in parts of Ukraine.

==== Knockout phase ====
===== Round of 16 =====
19 February 2019 First leg	Lyon (France)	0–0	(Spain) Barcelona	Décines-Charpieu, France
21:00 CET (UTC+1)	Aouar (yellow card) 3'; Dubois (yellow card) 33'	Report	Roberto (yellow card) 80'; Semedo (yellow card) 88'	Stadium: Parc Olympique Lyonnais; Attendance: 57,889; Referee: Cüneyt Çakır (Turkey)

13 March 2019 Second leg	Barcelona (Spain)	5–1 (5–1 agg.)	(France) Lyon	Barcelona, Spain
21:00 CET (UTC+1)	Messi 17' (pen.), 78'; Coutinho 31'; Lenglet (yellow card) 49'; Piqué 81'; O. Dembélé 86'	Report	Marçal (yellow card) 33'; M. Dembélé (yellow card) 45+4'; Tousart 58'	Stadium: Camp Nou; Attendance: 92,346; Referee: Szymon Marciniak (Poland)

== Statistics ==
=== Appearances and goals ===
No.	Pos	Nat	Player	Total		Ligue 1		Coupe de France		Coupe de la Ligue		UEFA Champions League	
No.	Pos	Nat	Player	Apps	Goals	Apps	Goals	Apps	Goals	Apps	Goals	Apps	Goals
Goalkeepers
1	GK	(Portugal) POR	Anthony Lopes	47	0	34	0	5	0	0	0	8	0
16	GK	(Switzerland) SUI	Anthony Racioppi	0	0	0	0	0	0	0	0	0	0
30	GK	(France) FRA	Mathieu Gorgelin	7	0	4	0	0	0	2	0	0+1	0
Defenders
2	DF	(France) FRA	Mapou Yanga-Mbiwa	4	0	4	0	0	0	0	0	0	0
4	DF	(Brazil) BRA	Rafael	21	0	11+7	0	0	0	0	0	3	0
5	DF	(Belgium) BEL	Jason Denayer	45	3	31	2	4	1	1+1	0	8	0
6	DF	(Brazil) BRA	Marcelo	46	0	33	0	4	0	1	0	8	0
14	DF	(France) FRA	Léo Dubois	34	3	21+4	1	3	1	1	0	3+2	1
15	DF	(Madagascar) MAD	Jérémy Morel	14	0	12	0	1	0	0	0	1	0
20	DF	(Brazil) BRA	Marçal	21	0	12	0	3+1	0	2	0	3	0
22	DF	(France) FRA	Ferland Mendy	44	3	27+3	2	3+1	1	1+1	0	8	0
23	DF	(Netherlands) NED	Kenny Tete	20	0	12+1	0	2	0	2	0	2+1	0
26	DF	(France) FRA	Oumar Solet	3	0	1	0	1	0	1	0	0	0
Midfielders
8	MF	(France) FRA	Houssem Aouar	47	7	35+2	7	1+1	0	1	0	7	0
24	MF	(Spain) ESP	Pape Cheikh Diop	23	0	5+7	0	2+2	0	2	0	1+4	0
25	MF	(France) FRA	Maxence Caqueret	2	0	0	0	1+1	0	0	0	0	0
28	MF	(France) FRA	Tanguy Ndombele	49	3	31+3	1	5	0	1+1	0	7+1	2
29	MF	(France) FRA	Lucas Tousart	42	1	20+10	0	4	0	1	0	5+2	1
Forwards
7	FW	(France) FRA	Martin Terrier	42	11	16+16	9	3+2	1	2	1	2+1	0
9	FW	(France) FRA	Moussa Dembélé	46	20	21+12	15	5	3	1+1	1	3+3	1
10	FW	(Burkina Faso) BFA	Bertrand Traoré	48	11	24+10	7	1+3	1	1+1	2	4+4	1
11	FW	(Netherlands) NED	Memphis Depay	47	12	29+7	10	1+1	1	1	0	7+1	1
17	FW	(France) FRA	Lenny Pintor	2	0	0+1	0	0+1	0	0	0	0	0
18	FW	(France) FRA	Nabil Fekir	39	12	24+5	9	3	0	1	0	6	3
19	FW	(France) FRA	Amine Gouiri	0	0	0	0	0	0	0	0	0	0
27	FW	(Ivory Coast) CIV	Maxwel Cornet	36	12	12+15	7	3+1	2	0	0	2+3	3
31	FW	(France) FRA	Yassin Fekir	3	0	0+1	0	0+1	0	0+1	0	0	0
Players transferred out during the season
12	MF	(France) FRA	Jordan Ferri	5	0	1+3	0	0	0	0	0	0+1	0
25	MF	(Luxembourg) LUX	Christopher Martins	0	0	0	0	0	0	0	0	0	0
9	FW	(Dominican Republic) DOM	Mariano	3	0	2+1	0	0	0	0	0	0	0

Last updated: 24 May 2019
Source: Competitions

=== Goalscorers ===
Rank	No.	Pos	Nat	Name	Ligue 1	Coupe de France	Coupe de la Ligue	UEFA CL	Total
1	9	FW	(France)	Moussa Dembélé	15	3	1	1	20
2	11	FW	(Netherlands)	Memphis Depay	10	1	0	1	12
2	18	FW	(France)	Nabil Fekir	9	0	0	3	12
2	27	FW	(Ivory Coast)	Maxwel Cornet	7	2	0	3	12
3	7	FW	(France)	Martin Terrier	9	1	1	0	11
3	10	FW	(Burkina Faso)	Bertrand Traoré	7	1	2	1	11
4	8	MF	(France)	Houssem Aouar	7	0	0	0	7
5	5	DF	(Belgium)	Jason Denayer	2	1	0	0	3
5	22	DF	(France)	Ferland Mendy	2	1	0	0	3
5	14	DF	(France)	Léo Dubois	1	1	0	1	3
5	28	MF	(France)	Tanguy Ndombele	1	0	0	2	3
6	29	MF	(France)	Lucas Tousart	0	0	0	1	1
Own goal					0	0	0	0	0
Totals					70	11	4	13	98

Last updated: 24 May 2019
