= Fekir =

Fekir may refer to:

- Nabil Fekir (born 1993), French professional footballer
- Yassin Fekir (born 1997), French professional footballer

== See also ==
- Fakir
