= Fernando Marçal =

Brazilian footballer (born 1989)

Marçal
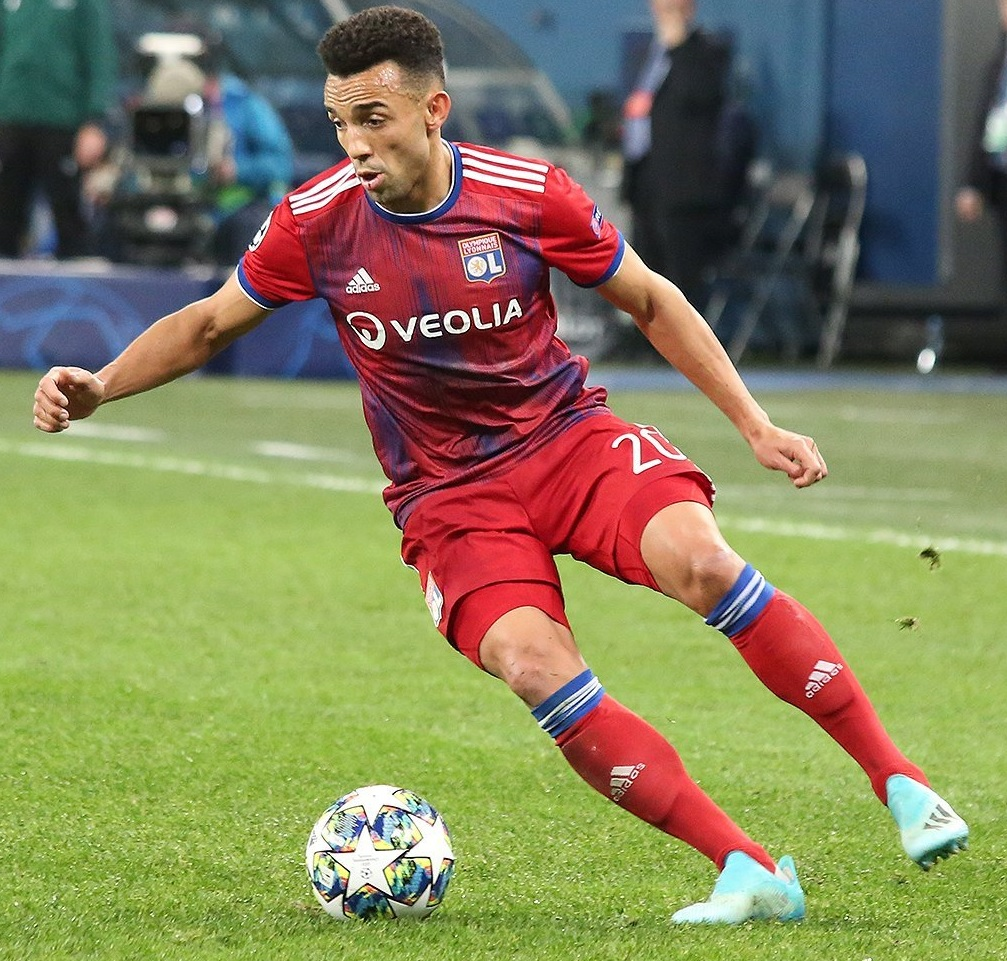
- Marçal with Lyon in 2019

Personal information
- Full name: Fernando Marçal de Oliveira
- Date of birth: 19 February 1989 (age 37)
- Place of birth: São Paulo, Brazil
- Height: 1.78 m (5 ft 10 in)
- Position: Left-back

Team information
- Current team: Botafogo
- Number: 21

Youth career
- 2005–2008: Grêmio

Senior career*
Years	Team	Apps	(Gls)
2009–2010	Guaratinguetá	3	(0)
2010–2011	Torreense	40	(3)
2011–2015	Nacional	97	(2)
2015–2017	Benfica	0	(0)
2015–2016	→ Gaziantepspor (loan)	21	(0)
2016–2017	→ Guingamp (loan)	31	(0)
2017–2020	Lyon	42	(0)
2019–2020	Lyon B	2	(0)
2020–2022	Wolverhampton Wanderers	31	(0)
2022–	Botafogo	92	(8)
- * Club domestic league appearances and goals as of 8 April 2026

Fernando Marçal de Oliveira (born 19 February 1989) is a Brazilian professional footballer who plays as a left-back for Campeonato Brasileiro Série A club Botafogo.

== Career ==
After playing for Grêmio and Guaratinguetá in Brazil, Marçal headed to Portugal. In 2010, he signed for Torreense in the Portuguese Second Division. He made 40 appearances for the club before signing for Nacional in Primeira Liga. After amassing over 80 appearances at Nacional, his performances attracted the interest of 2014–15 Primeira Liga champions Benfica, who subsequently signed him on a five-year contract.

On 20 August 2015, Marçal was loaned out to Turkish side Gaziantepspor for a season.

On 16 June 2017, he signed for French club Olympique Lyonnais for €4.5 million after a stint with rival club Guingamp, where he made seven assists in 31 league appearances.

On 6 September 2020, Marçal moved to English side Wolverhampton Wanderers for a fee of €2 million on a two-year deal. Marçal made his full debut for Wolves on 14 September 2020 in a Premier League game away to Sheffield United.

In May 2022, Wolves manager Bruno Lage confirmed Marçal's departure at the end of the 2021–22 season. On 16 June 2022, he signed for Brazilian club Botafogo on a contract until the end of the 2023 season, with an option for a further season. Marçal was handed the number 21 jersey at the club.

Marçal made his debut against Santos, in a 2–0 defeat on 20 July 2022, a game valid for the Brazilian Championship.

The first goal with the Botafogo shirt was in the 3–1 victory against Fortaleza, at Arena Castelão, in the Brazilian Championship.

On 20 April 2024, Botafogo announced another injury to Marçal's right calf. In a statement, the club gave a minimum return forecast of four weeks.

== Career statistics ==
As of match played 21 November 2023

Appearances and goals by club, season and competition
Club	Season	League			State League		National cup (Note: Includes Copa do Brasil, Taça de Portugal, Turkish Cup, Coupe de France, FA Cup)		League cup (Note: Includes Taça da Liga, Coupe de la Ligue)		Continental		Other		Total	
Club	Season	Division	Apps	Goals	Apps	Goals	Apps	Goals	Apps	Goals	Apps	Goals	Apps	Goals	Apps	Goals
Guaratinguetá	2010	Série B	0	0	3 (Note: Appearances in Campeonato Paulista Série A2)	0	—		—		—		—		3	0
Torreense	2010–11	Segunda Divisão	28	2	—		2	0	0	0	—		—		30	2
Torreense	2011–12	Segunda Divisão	12	1	—		2	0	0	0	—		—		14	1
Torreense	Total		40	3	—		4	0	0	0	—		—		44	3
Nacional	2011–12	Primeira Liga	14	0	—		1	0	0	0	—		—		15	0
Nacional	2012–13	Primeira Liga	27	0	—		1	0	1	0	—		—		29	0
Nacional	2013–14	Primeira Liga	27	2	—		0	0	1	0	—		—		28	2
Nacional	2014–15	Primeira Liga	29	0	—		5	0	1	0	2 (Note: Appearances in UEFA Europa League)	0	—		37	0
Nacional	Total		97	2	—		7	0	3	0	2	0	—		109	2
Benfica	2015–16	Primeira Liga	0	0	—		0	0	0	0	0	0	0	0	0	0
Benfica	2016–17	Primeira Liga	0	0	—		0	0	0	0	0	0	0	0	0	0
Benfica	Total		0	0	—		0	0	0	0	0	0	0	0	0	0
Gaziantepspor (loan)	2015–16	Süper Lig	21	0	—		2	1	—		—		—		23	1
Guingamp (loan)	2016–17	Ligue 1	31	0	—		4	0	0	0	—		—		35	0
Lyon	2017–18	Ligue 1	18	0	—		4	0	0	0	6	0	—		28	0
Lyon	2018–19	Ligue 1	12	0	—		4	0	2	0	3 (Note: Appearances in UEFA Champions League)	0	—		21	0
Lyon	2019–20	Ligue 1	11	0	—		5	0	2	0	7	0	—		25	0
Lyon	2020–21	Ligue 1	1	0	—		0	0	—		—		—		1	0
Lyon	Total		42	0	—		13	0	4	0	16	0	—		75	0
Lyon B	2018–19	Championnat National 2	1	0	—		—		—		—		—		1	0
Lyon B	2019–20	Championnat National 2	1	0	—		—		—		—		—		1	0
Lyon B	Total		2	0	—		—		—		—		—		2	0
Wolverhampton Wanderers	2020–21	Premier League	13	0	—		0	0	0	0	—		—		13	0
Wolverhampton Wanderers	2021–22	Premier League	18	0	—		1	0	0	0	—		—		19	0
Wolverhampton Wanderers	Total		31	0	—		1	0	0	0	—		—		32	0
Botafogo	2022	Série A	18	1	—		—		—		—		—		18	1
Botafogo	2023	Série A	22	0	10 (Note: Appearances in Campeonato Carioca)	1	4	0	—		6	0	—		42	1
Botafogo	Total		40	1	10	1	4	0	—		6	0	—		60	2
Career total			304	6	10	1	31	1	7	0	24	0	0	0	383	8

== Honours ==
Benfica

- Supertaça Cândido de Oliveira: 2016

Lyon

- Coupe de la Ligue runner-up: 2019–20

Botafogo

- Série A: 2024
- Copa Libertadores: 2024
- Taça Rio: 2023, 2024
