= Lucas Tousart =

French footballer (born 1997)

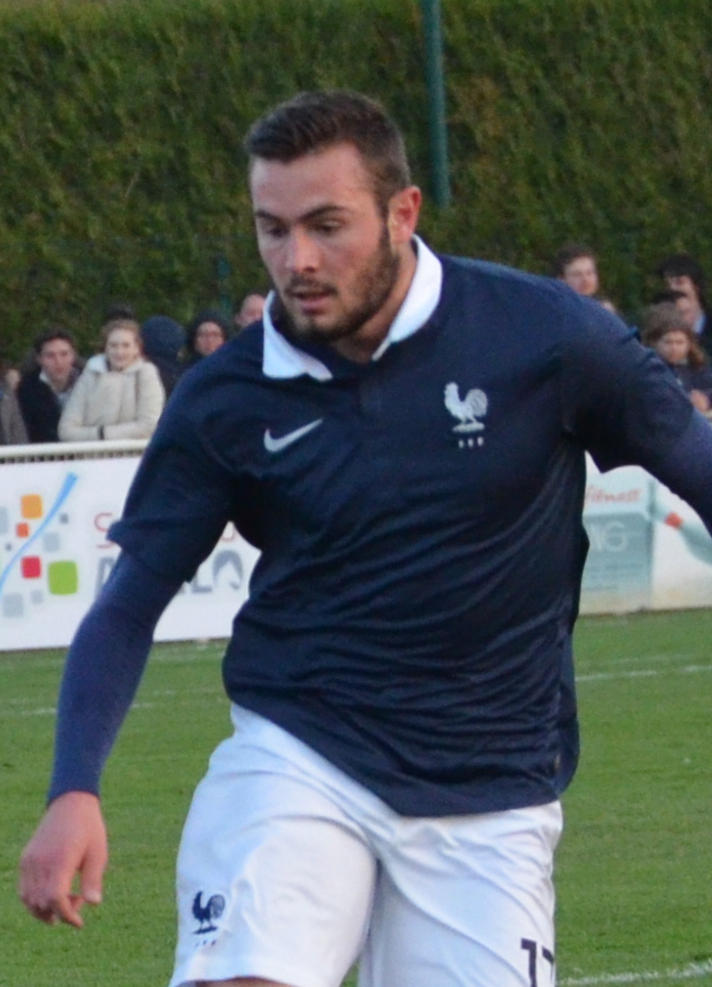
- Tousart with France U19 in 2015

Personal information
- Full name: Lucas Simon Pierre Tousart
- Date of birth: 29 April 1997 (age 29)
- Place of birth: Arras, France
- Height: 1.85 m (6 ft 1 in)
- Position: Midfielder

Team information
- Current team: Brest
- Number: 24

Youth career
- 2003–2004: JS du Pays Rignacois
- 2004–2010: US Pays Rignacois
- 2010–2013: Rodez
- 2013–2015: Valenciennes

Senior career*
Years	Team	Apps	(Gls)
2014–2015	Valenciennes II	12	(0)
2015	Valenciennes	18	(0)
2015–2016	Lyon B	17	(1)
2015–2020	Lyon	108	(3)
2020–2023	Hertha BSC	89	(8)
2020	→ Lyon (loan)	6	(0)
2023–2025	Union Berlin	38	(0)
2025–	Brest	24	(1)

International career
2015–2016	France U19	21	(1)
2016–2017	France U20	7	(2)
2016–2019	France U21	24	(0)
2021	France Olympic	4	(0)
- * Club domestic league appearances and goals as of 19 May 2026

Lucas Simon Pierre Tousart (born 29 April 1997) is a French professional footballer who plays as a midfielder for Ligue 1 club Brest. He has also represented France internationally, having played for the country's under-19, under-20 and under-21 teams, as well as the France Olympic football team.

== Club career ==
=== Valenciennes ===
Tousart made his debut for the Ligue 2 side on 24 January 2015 against Tours. He played the whole match in a 2–1 home loss.

=== Lyon ===
Tousart made his Lyon debut on 5 December 2015 in a Ligue 1 match against Angers. He was replaced by Clement Grenier after 61 minutes in a 2–0 home loss. He scored his first professional goal on 16 February 2017 in a UEFA Europa League game against Dutch side AZ Alkmaar, scoring the first goal in an eventual 4–1 victory.

=== Hertha BSC ===
On 27 January 2020, Tousart signed with Bundesliga side Hertha BSC. He was however sent back to Lyon on loan until the end of the season. While on loan to Lyon, Tousart volleyed in the game's only goal as Lyon shocked Juventus in the first leg of their Champions League Round of 16 tie. It was announced in June 2020 that Tousart would join Hertha on 1 July, meaning that Tousart would be unable to take part in Lyon's postponed Champions League match following the COVID-19 pandemic.

=== Union Berlin ===
On 19 July 2023, Tousart joined Hertha BSC's local rivals Union Berlin. On 16 September 2023, he made his debut for the club in a 1–2 away loss to VfL Wolfsburg, coming on as a substitute in the second half.

=== Brest ===
On 1 September 2025, Tousart signed with Ligue 1 side Brest.

== Career statistics ==
As of match played 17 May 2025

Appearances and goals by club, season and competition
Club	Season	League			National cup		League cup		Europe (Note: Includes UEFA Europa League and UEFA Champions League)		Other (Note: Includes Trophée des Champions)		Total	
Club	Season	Division	Apps	Goals	Apps	Goals	Apps	Goals	Apps	Goals	Apps	Goals	Apps	Goals
Valenciennes	2014–15	Ligue 2	17	0	1	0	0	0	—		—		18	0
Valenciennes	2015–16	Ligue 2	1	0	0	0	0	0	—		—		1	0
Valenciennes	Total		18	0	1	0	0	0	0	0	0	0	19	0
Lyon	2015–16	Ligue 1	1	0	0	0	0	0	0	0	0	0	1	0
Lyon	2016–17	Ligue 1	22	1	2	0	1	0	8	1	0	0	33	2
Lyon	2017–18	Ligue 1	37	0	4	0	0	0	9	0	—		50	0
Lyon	2018–19	Ligue 1	30	0	4	0	1	0	7	1	—		42	1
Lyon	2019–20	Ligue 1	24	2	5	0	3	0	7	1	—		39	3
Lyon	Total		114	3	15	0	5	0	31	3	0	0	165	6
Hertha BSC	2020–21	Bundesliga	26	1	1	0	—		—		—		27	1
Hertha BSC	2021–22	Bundesliga	30	2	3	0	—		—		—		33	2
Hertha BSC	2022–23	Bundesliga	33	5	1	1	—		—		—		34	6
Hertha BSC	Total		89	8	5	1	0	0	0	0	0	0	94	9
Union Berlin	2023–24	Bundesliga	23	0	1	0	—		5	0	—		29	0
Union Berlin	2024–25	Bundesliga	15	0	1	0	—		—		—		16	0
Union Berlin	Total		38	0	2	0	—		5	0	—		45	0
Brest	2025–26	Ligue 1	0	0	0	0	—		—		—		0	0
Career total			259	11	23	1	5	0	36	3	0	0	323	15

== Honours ==
Lyon

- Coupe de la Ligue runner-up: 2019–20

France U19

- UEFA European Under-19 Championship: 2016

Individual

- UEFA European Under-19 Championship Team of the Tournament: 2016
