= Youssouf Koné (footballer, born 1995) =

Malian footballer

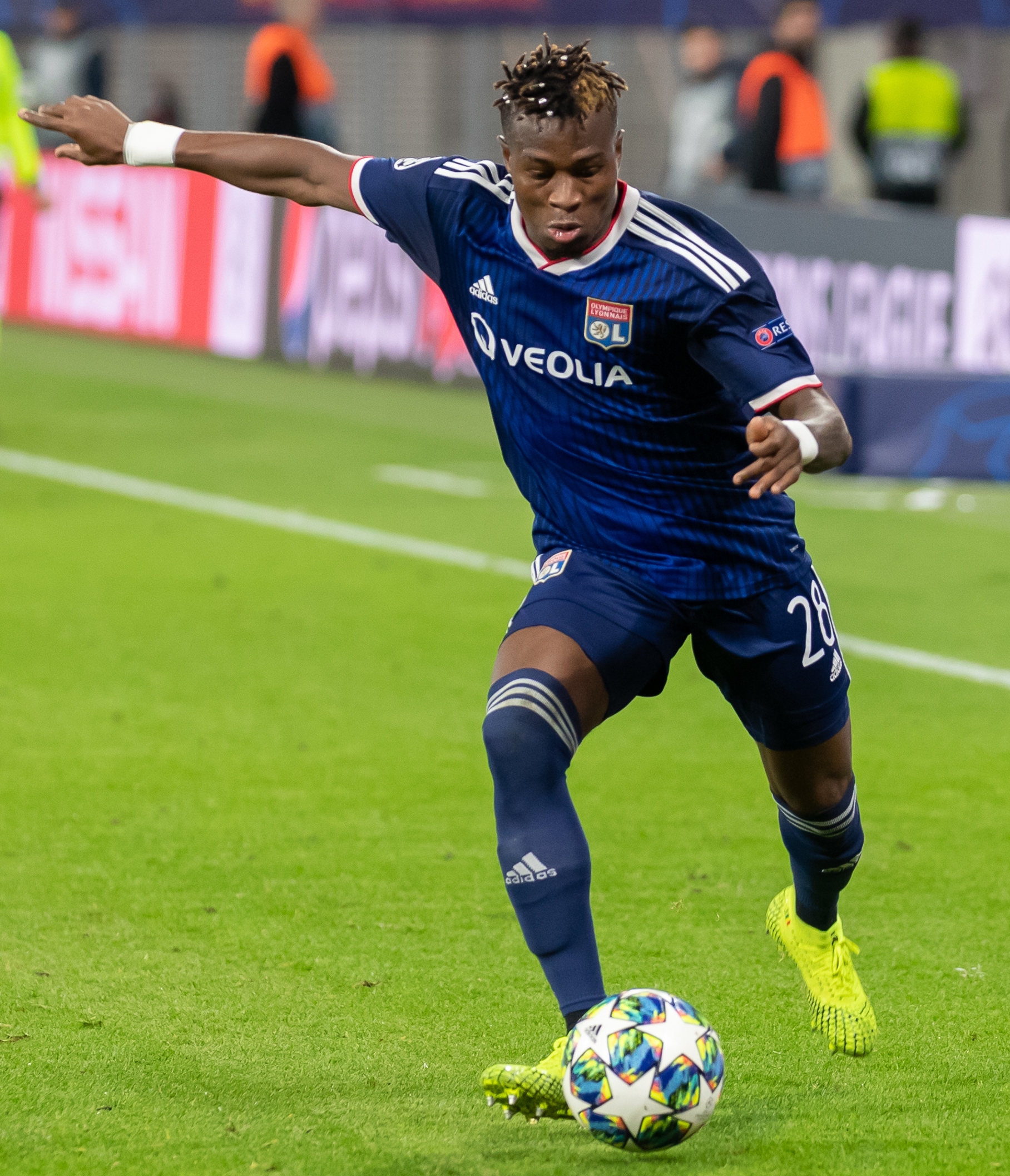
- Koné with Lyon in October 2019

Personal information
- Full name: Youssouf Koné
- Date of birth: 5 July 1995 (age 31)
- Place of birth: Bamako, Mali
- Height: 1.74 m (5 ft 9 in)
- Position: Left-back

Youth career
- –2011: JMG Academy Bamako
- 2011–2013: AS Bakaridjan

Senior career*
Years	Team	Apps	(Gls)
2013–2019	Lille	25	(0)
2017–2018	→ Reims (loan)	18	(1)
2019–2023	Lyon	11	(0)
2020–2021	→ Elche (loan)	3	(0)
2021	→ Hatayspor (loan)	6	(0)
2021–2022	→ Troyes (loan)	21	(0)
2022–2023	→ Ajaccio (loan)	13	(0)
2023–2024	Molenbeek	9	(0)
2024–2025	JS Kabylie	11	(0)

International career^{‡}
2013–2015	Mali U20	11	(1)
2015–	Mali	17	(1)
Medal record
Representing Mali
FIFA U-20 World Cup
Third place	2015 New Zealand	U-20 Team
- * Club domestic league appearances and goals as of 23:55, 11 March 2025 (UTC) ‡ National team caps and goals as of 23:25, 14 November 2019 (UTC)

Youssouf Koné (born 5 July 1995) is a Malian professional footballer who plays as a left-back for the Mali national team.

== Club career ==
Koné is a youth team graduate from Lille. He made his Ligue 1 debut on 2 March 2014 in a 3–2 away win over Ajaccio. His second appearance came on 12 April 2014, a league game against Valenciennes.

Koné spent the first half of the 2017–18 season at Ligue 2 side Reims on loan after being loaned out by Head Coach Marcelo Bielsa. The full-season loan contract was terminated early when he suffered a cruciate ligament injury.

Following the departures of both Fodé Ballo-Touré to Monaco and Hamza Mendyl to Schalke 04, Koné established himself as first-choice left-back under Galtier post-Christmas In Lille's excellent 2018–19 campaign, finishing second to Paris Saint-Germain.

On 3 July 2019, he signed a contract with Lyon. The fee was estimated at €9 million. On 29 September of the following year, after just 11 league appearances, he was loaned to La Liga side Elche for one year. On 1 February 2021, Elche and Lyon, agreed to terminate the loan of Koné, due to a lack of playing time. On the same day, Koné was loaned to Turkish club Hatayspor.

On 30 August 2022, Lyon announced Koné's loan to Ajaccio for the 2022–23 season.

On 28 August 2023, Koné terminated his contract with Lyon following a mutual consent, and joined Molenbeek on a 1-year contract.

On 9 September 2024, Koné signed a 1-year contract, with JS Kabylie. On 11 March 2025, he was released by JSK.

== International career ==
Koné debuted for the Mali national team in a 2017 Africa Cup of Nations qualification match against Benin on 6 September 2015.

He then competes with his country twice in the Africa Cup of Nations in 2017 and 2019.

== International career statistics ==
As of match played on 14 November 2019

Appearances and goals by national team and year
National team	Year	Apps	Goals
Mali	2015	2	0
Mali	2016	4	0
Mali	2017	5	0
Mali	2018	0	0
Mali	2019	6	1
Total		17	1

Scores and results list Mali's goal tally first, score column indicates score after each Koné goal.

List of international goals scored by Youssouf Koné
No.	Date	Venue	Opponent	Score	Result	Competition
1	14 June 2019	Saoud bin Abdulrahman Stadium, Al Wakrah, Qatar	Cameroon	1–0	1–1	Friendly

== Honours ==
Stade de Reims

- Ligue 2: 2017–18

Mali U20

- FIFA U-20 World Cup bronze medal: 2015
