= Yassin Fekir =

French footballer (born 1997)

Personal information
- Date of birth: 5 May 1997 (age 29)
- Place of birth: Lyon, France
- Height: 1.70 m (5 ft 7 in)
- Position: Winger

Team information
- Current team: Betis B
- Number: 18

Youth career
- Vaulx

Senior career*
Years	Team	Apps	(Gls)
2015	Vaulx	1	(0)
2015–2019	Lyon II	49	(13)
2017–2019	Lyon	1	(0)
2019–	Betis B	60	(7)
2019–2020	→ Guijuelo (loan)	21	(3)
2022–2023	→ Linense (loan)	31	(3)
- * Club domestic league appearances and goals as of 7 January 2024

Yassin Fekir (born 5 May 1997) is a French professional footballer who plays as a winger for Spanish club Betis Deportivo Balompié.

== Career ==
=== Lyon ===
On 4 July 2017, Fekir signed his first professional contract with Olympique Lyonnais. He made his professional debut in a 3–2 Coupe de la Ligue win over Amiens SC on 19 December 2018, coming on as an 86th-minute substitute for Bertrand Traoré. On 3 March 2019, he played his first Ligue 1 game, coming on for the last 11 minutes in place of Moussa Dembélé in a 5–1 win against Toulouse.

=== Betis ===
On 23 July 2019, Fekir signed for Spanish club Real Betis as part of the deal which also saw his brother Nabil Fekir move to Betis. Lyon will reserve 50% of any future sale of Yassin as well. He was initially assigned to the B-team in Tercera División, and on the last day of transfer window, he was loaned out for the season to CD Guijuelo of Segunda División B.

Fekir was promoted to the Betis first team squad on 1 February 2021, and registered for the rest of the La Liga season. On 31 August, he was demoted back to the B-team for the 2021–22 Primera División RFEF.

Fekir was loaned to Balompédica Linense for the 2022–23 Primera Federación season.

== Personal life ==
Fekir is the younger brother of the French international footballer Nabil Fekir. Fekir is of Algerian descent.

== Career statistics ==
As of match played 7 January 2024

Appearances and goals by club, season and competition
Club	Season	League			National cup (Note: Includes Coupe de France, Copa del Rey)		League cup (Note: Includes Coupe de la Ligue)		Total	
Club	Season	Division	Apps	Goals	Apps	Goals	Apps	Goals	Apps	Goals
Vaulx	2014–15	France Amateur 2	1	0	0	0	0	0	1	0
Lyon II	2015–16	France Amateur	1	0	—		—		1	0
Lyon II	2016–17	France Amateur	13	1	—		—		13	1
Lyon II	2017–18	National 2	12	3	—		—		12	3
Lyon II	2018–19	National 2	24	9	—		—		24	9
Lyon II	Total		50	13	0	0	0	0	50	13
Lyon	2018–19	Ligue 1	1	0	1	0	1	0	3	0
Guijuelo (loan)	2019–20	Segunda División B	21	3	1	0	—		22	3
Betis B	2020–21	Segunda División B	12	2	—		—		12	2
Betis B	2021–22	Primera División RFEF	32	2	—		—		32	2
Betis B	2023–24	Segunda Federación	16	3	—		—		16	3
Betis B	Total		60	7	0	0	0	0	60	7
Linense (loan)	2022–23	Primera Federación	31	3	—		—		31	3
Career total			164	26	2	0	1	0	167	26
