= Antony Gautier =

French football referee (born 1977)

Antony Gautier (born 19 November 1977, in Seclin) is a French former football referee who officiated primarily in Ligue 1.

Gautier became a FIFA referee in 2010 and served as a referee in 2014 World Cup qualifiers.

In June 2020, Gautier was elected mayor of the French city Bailleul.

Despite appearing on the list of referees for the 2022-23 Ligue 1 season, Gautier did not take charge of any games and in January 2023, he was appointed as director of refereeing in France. His final match as a referee was the relegation play-off tie between St Etienne and Auxerre, which Auxerre won on penalties.
