= 2015–16 Gazélec Ajaccio season =

Gazélec Ajaccio
2015–16 season
- Chairman: Olivier Miniconi
- Manager: Thierry Laurey
- Stadium: Stade Ange Casanova
- Ligue 1: 19th (relegated)
- Coupe de France: Quarter-final
- Coupe de la Ligue: Round of 32
- Top goalscorer: League: Mohamed Larbi (7); All: Khalid Boutaïb (9)
- Highest home attendance: 4,125 vs Lyon (20 December 2015)
- Lowest home attendance: 800 vs Sainte-Marienne (2 January 2016)
Home colours	Away colours

The 2015–16 Gazélec Ajaccio season is the 105th professional season of the club since its creation in 1910. This is Gazélec Ajaccio's first season in Ligue 1 after finishing second in the 2014–15 Ligue 2 season.

== Players ==
French teams are limited to four players without EU citizenship. Hence, the squad list includes only the principal nationality of each player; several non-European players on the squad have dual citizenship with an EU country. Also, players from the ACP countries—countries in Africa, the Caribbean, and the Pacific that are signatories to the Cotonou Agreement—are not counted against non-EU quotas due to the Kolpak ruling.

=== Current squad ===
As of 29 January 2016

Note: Flags indicate national team as defined under FIFA eligibility rules; some limited exceptions apply. Players may hold more than one non-FIFA nationality.

No.	Pos.	Nation	Player
1	GK	FRA	Clément Maury
3	DF	GUI	Issiaga Sylla (on loan from Toulouse)
4	DF	FRA	Rodéric Filippi
5	DF	FRA	Jérémie Bréchet
6	DF	FRA	David Ducourtioux
7	FW	FRA	Kévin Mayi
8	MF	FRA	Jérôme Lemoigne
9	FW	MAR	Khalid Boutaïb
10	MF	TUN	Mohamed Larbi
13	DF	FRA	Alassane Touré
15	DF	SEN	Kader Mangane

No.	Pos.	Nation	Player
18	DF	CTA	Amos Youga
19	FW	CMR	Jacques Zoua
20	MF	FRA	Louis Poggi (captain)
21	DF	FRA	Pablo Martinez
23	MF	CRO	Damjan Đoković
24	FW	COD	John Tshibumbu
27	FW	TUN	Amine Chermiti
28	FW	FRA	Grégory Pujol
29	DF	FRA	Alexandre Coeff (on loan from Udinese)
30	GK	CMR	Jules Goda
40	GK	FRA	Paul-André Guérin

== Transfers ==
=== Transfers in ===
Date	Pos.	Player	Age	Moved from	Fee	Notes
1 July 2015	DF	(France) Alassane Touré	26	(France) Tours	Free Transfer	
9 July 2015	MF	(France) Jérôme Lemoigne	32	(France) Lens	Undisclosed	
20 July 2015	MF	(Senegal) Kader Mangane	32	Unattached	Free Transfer	
22 July 2015	MF	(Netherlands) Damjan Đoković	25	(Italy) Bologna	Free Transfer	
6 August 2015	FW	(Cameroon) Jacques Zoua	23	(Germany) Hamburger SV	Free Transfer	
13 August 2015	FW	(Senegal) Issiar Dia	28	(Qatar) Lekhwiya	Undisclosed	
29 January 2016	FW	(Tunisia) Amine Chermiti	28	(Switzerland) Zürich	Undisclosed	

=== Loans in ===
Date	Pos.	Player	Age	Loaned from	Return date	Notes
4 July 2015	DF	(Guinea) Issiaga Sylla	21	(France) Toulouse	30 June 2016	
4 August 2015	DF	(France) Alexandre Coeff	23	(Italy) Udinese	30 June 2016	

=== Transfers out ===
Date	Pos.	Player	Age	Moved to	Fee	Notes
1 July 2015	MF	(France) Julien François	35	Unattached	Released	
1 July 2015	MF	(France) Pierre-François Sinapi	25	Unattached	Released	
1 July 2015	DF	(France) Yoann Andreu	26	(France) Angers	Free Transfer	
1 July 2015	MF	(France) Cyriaque Rivieyran	24	(France) Clermont	Free Transfer	
1 July 2015	MF	(France) Florian Fabre	28	(France) Nîmes	Free Transfer	
1 July 2015	MF	(Senegal) Matar Fall	33	(France) SC Toulon	Free Transfer	
16 July 2015	FW	(France) Lucas Libbra	19	(France) Vitré	Free Transfer	
20 July 2015	MF	(Comoros) Ali M'Madi	25	(France) Grenoble	Free Transfer	
5 August 2015	FW	(France) Rafik Boujedra	22	(France) Bourg-Péronnas	Free Transfer	
6 January 2016	FW	(Senegal) Issiar Dia	28	Unattached	Released	

== Competitions ==
=== Ligue 1 ===
==== League table ====
Pos	Team	Pld	W	D	L	GF	GA	GD	Pts	Qualification or relegation
16	Guingamp	38	11	11	16	47	56	−9	44	
17	Toulouse	38	9	13	16	45	55	−10	40	
18	Reims (R)	38	10	9	19	44	57	−13	39	Relegation to Ligue 2 (Note: Starting this season, Ligue 1 decided to reduce the number of relegation spots from three to two. However, the decision was appealed and overturned so three teams were relegated.)
19	Gazélec Ajaccio (R)	38	8	13	17	37	58	−21	37	Relegation to Ligue 2
20	Troyes (R)	38	3	9	26	28	83	−55	18	Relegation to Ligue 2

Source: Ligue 1, Soccerway
Rules for classification: 1) Points; 2) Goal difference; 3) Goals scored; 4) Head-to-head points; 5) Head-to-head goal difference; 6) Fairplay ranking.
(R) Relegated

==== Results summary ====
Overall								Home						Away					
Pld	W	D	L	GF	GA	GD	Pts	W	D	L	GF	GA	GD	W	D	L	GF	GA	GD
38	8	13	17	37	58	−21	37	5	7	7	23	32	−9	3	6	10	14	26	−12

Last updated: 14 May 2016.
Source: Competitive matches

==== Results by round ====
Round	1	2	3	4	5	6	7	8	9	10	11	12	13	14	15	16	17	18	19	20	21	22	23	24	25	26	27	28	29	30	31	32	33	34	35	36	37	38
Ground	A	A	H	A	H	A	H	A	H	A	H	H	A	A	H	A	H	A	H	A	H	A	H	A	H	H	A	H	A	H	A	H	A	H	H	A	H	A
Result	D	L	L	L	L	L	D	L	D	L	W	W	W	W	D	W	D	D	W	D	D	L	L	L	D	L	D	D	L	W	L	L	D	L	W	L	L	L
Position	12	17	18	20	20	20	19	20	20	20	19	18	18	16	16	13	15	16	12	14	13	13	16	17	17	18	18	18	18	18	18	18	18	18	17	17	18	19

Source: Ligue1
A = Away; H = Home; W = Win; D = Draw; L = Loss

==== Matches ====
Win Draw Loss

8 August 2015 1	Troyes	0–0	Gazélec Ajaccio	Troyes
21:00 CEST (UTC+02:00)		Report	Youga (yellow card) 16'; Martinez (yellow card) 27'; Ducourtioux (yellow card) 41'; Sylla (yellow card) 75'	Stadium: Stade de l'Aube; Attendance: 10,858; Referee: Jérôme Miguelgorry

16 August 2015 2	Paris Saint-Germain	2–0	Gazélec Ajaccio	Paris
21:00 CEST (UTC+02:00)	Matuidi 11'; Silva 21'; Aurier (yellow card) 74'	Report	Lemoigne (yellow card) 54'; Zoua (yellow card) 62'; Filippi (yellow card) 84'	Stadium: Parc des Princes; Attendance: 46,524; Referee: Wilfried Bien

22 August 2015 3	Gazélec Ajaccio	0–2	Angers	Ajaccio, Corsica
20:00 CEST (UTC+02:00)	Lemoigne (yellow card) 14'; Coeff (yellow card) 90+3'	Report	Ndoye 2', 20'; Andreu (yellow card) 31'; Thomas (yellow card) 73'	Stadium: Stade Ange Casanova; Attendance: 3,911; Referee: Bartolomeu Varela

29 August 2015 4	Lille	1–0	Gazélec Ajaccio	Villeneuve d'Ascq
20:00 CEST (UTC+02:00)	Boufal 23', (yellow card) 81'	Report	Sylla (yellow card) 36'; Mangane (yellow card) 45+1'; Filippi (yellow card) 52'	Stadium: Stade Pierre-Mauroy; Attendance: 27,138; Referee: Mikael Lesage

13 September 2015 5	Gazélec Ajaccio	0–1	Monaco	Ajaccio, Corsica
14:00 CEST (UTC+02:00)	Martinez (yellow card) 20'; Ducourtioux (yellow card) 30'; Youga (yellow card) 90+1'	Report	Fabinho (yellow card) 11', (goal) 17' (pen.); Echiéjilé (yellow card) 76'; Bahlouli (yellow card) 90+4'	Stadium: Stade Ange Casanova; Attendance: 3,880; Referee: Sébastien Moreira

19 September 2015 6	Guingamp	2–1	Gazélec Ajaccio	Guingamp
20:00 CEST (UTC+02:00)	Privat 23'; Briand 61'; Angoua (yellow card) 74'; Mathis (yellow card) 80'	Report	Sylla (yellow card) 27' (yellow-red card) 39'; Mangane 35'; Lemoigne (yellow card) 37'; Coeff (yellow card) 59'; Martinez (yellow card) 63'; Đoković (yellow card) 74'	Stadium: Stade du Roudourou; Attendance: 13,490; Referee: Nicolas Rainville

23 September 2015 7	Gazélec Ajaccio	1–1	Rennes	Ajaccio, Corsica
19:00 CEST (UTC+02:00)	Larbi 45+1'	Report	Sio (yellow card) 44', (goal) 89'	Stadium: Stade Ange Casanova; Attendance: 3,576; Referee: Fredy Fautrel

26 September 2015 8	Caen	2–0	Gazélec Ajaccio	Caen
20:00 CEST (UTC+02:00)	Rodelin 28'; Imorou 55'; Leborgne (yellow card) 64'	Report	Đoković (yellow card) 38'; Filippi (yellow card) 48'; Lemoigne (yellow card) 50'; Mangane (yellow card) 57'	Stadium: Stade Michel d'Ornano; Attendance: 15,835; Referee: Lionel Jaffredo

3 October 2015 9	Gazélec Ajaccio	2–2	Toulouse	Ajaccio, Corsica
20:00 CEST (UTC+02:00)	Filippi (yellow card) 16'; Mayi 25'; Pujol (yellow card) 41', (goal) 44'; Ducourtioux (yellow card) 66'	Report	Braithwaite 21'; Bodiger (yellow card) 47'; Sylla 49' (o.g.)	Stadium: Stade Ange Casanova; Attendance: 3,465; Referee: Frank Schneider

17 October 2015 10	Saint-Étienne	2–0	Gazélec Ajaccio	Saint Étienne
20:00 CEST (UTC+02:00)	Berić 20'; Monnet-Paquet 70'	Report		Stadium: Stade Geoffroy-Guichard; Attendance: 28,041; Referee: Stéphane Jochem

24 October 2015 11	Gazélec Ajaccio	3–1	Nice	Ajaccio, Corsica
20:00 CEST (UTC+02:00)	Pujol 1'; Ducourtioux (yellow card) 22'; Filippi 32'; Coeff (yellow card) 34'; Đoković 43', (yellow card) 48'; Lemoigne (red card) 88'	Report	Filippi 12' (o.g.); Koziello (yellow card) 42'; Mallmann (yellow card) 61'; Bodmer (yellow card) 67'; Boscagli (yellow card) 84'	Stadium: Stade Ange Casanova; Attendance: 3,757; Referee: Johan Hamel

31 October 2015 12	Gazélec Ajaccio	2–0	Bordeaux	Ajaccio, Corsica
20:00 CET (UTC+01:00)	Filippi (yellow card) 41' (yellow-red card) 65'; Larbi 44', 68'; Đoković (yellow card) 56'; Martinez (yellow card) 61'; Maury (yellow card) 73'	Report	Rolán (yellow card) 35'; Crivelli (yellow card) 61'; Poko (yellow card) 74'; Saivet (yellow card) 78'	Stadium: Stade Ange Casanova; Attendance: 3,628; Referee: Hakim Ben El Hadj

7 November 2015 13	Stade de Reims	1–2	Gazélec Ajaccio	Reims
20:00 CET (UTC+01:00)	Weber (yellow card) 66'; Kyei 77'; De Préville (yellow card) 82'; Devaux (yellow card) 90'	Report	Ducourtioux (yellow card) 31'; Boutaïb 34'; Zoua 71'; Sylla (yellow card) 81'	Stadium: Stade Auguste Delaune; Attendance: 11,393; Referee: Saïd Ennjimi

22 November 2015 14	SC Bastia	1–2	Gazélec Ajaccio	Bastia, Corsica
14:00 CET (UTC+01:00)	Brandão 5'; Leca (yellow card) 18'; Cahuzac (yellow card) 69'	Report	Zoua 19' (pen.); Boutaïb 70'; Ducourtioux (yellow card) 70'	Stadium: Stade Armand Cesari; Attendance: 11,985; Referee: Saïd Ennjimi

28 November 2015 15	Gazélec Ajaccio	1–1	Lorient	Ajaccio, Corsica
20:00 CET (UTC+01:00)	Lemoigne (yellow card) 4'; Larbi 18'; Boutaïb (yellow card) 29'	Report	Moukandjo 31' (pen.); Mesloub (yellow card) 33'	Stadium: Stade Ange Casanova; Attendance: 3,514; Referee: Jérôme Miguelgorry

2 December 2015 16	Montpellier	0–2	Gazélec Ajaccio	Montpellier
19:00 CET (UTC+01:00)	Hilton (yellow card) 30'	Report	Zoua 45+3'; Filippi (yellow card) 50'; Sylla (yellow card) 70'; Tshibumbu 74', (yellow card) 82'; Lemoigne (yellow card) 78'	Stadium: Stade de la Mosson; Attendance: 9,332; Referee: Hakim Ben El Hadj

5 December 2015 17	Gazélec Ajaccio	1–1	Nantes	Ajaccio, Corsica
20:00 CET (UTC+01:00)	Ducourtioux (yellow card) 31'; Tshibumbu (yellow card) 45+2', (goal) 84'	Report	Vizcarrondo (yellow card) 50'; Sala 56'; Sabaly (yellow card) 72'	Stadium: Stade Ange Casanova; Attendance: 3,614; Referee: Wilfried Bien

13 December 2015 18	Marseille	1–1	Gazélec Ajaccio	Marseille
17:00 CET (UTC+01:00)	Cabella (yellow card) 33'; Batshuayi 38'; Barrada (red card) 51'; Romao (yellow card) 90+2'	Report	Zoua 19' (pen.); Ducourtioux (yellow card) 32'; Mangane (yellow card) 41'; Youga (yellow card) 64'; Coeff (yellow card) 90+1'	Stadium: Stade Vélodrome; Attendance: 40,298; Referee: Nicolas Rainville

20 December 2015 19	Gazélec Ajaccio	2–1	Lyon	Ajaccio, Corsica
17:00 CET (UTC+01:00)	Mangane (yellow card) 21'; Larbi 32', 67'; Tshibumbu (yellow card) 83'; Boutaïb (yellow card) 90+1'	Report	Grenier 72', (yellow card) 82'	Stadium: Stade Ange Casanova; Attendance: 4,125; Referee: Amaury Delerue

9 January 2016 20	Monaco	2–2	Gazélec Ajaccio	Fontvieille
20:00 CET (UTC+01:00)	Moutinho (yellow card) 26'; Fabinho 51' (pen.); Coentrão (yellow card) 53'; Carvalho 73'	Report	Boutaïb 9'; Tshibumbu 31'; Ducourtioux (yellow card) 36'; Lemoigne (yellow card) 72'; Sylla (yellow card) 76'	Stadium: Stade Louis II; Attendance: 5,542; Referee: Stéphane Jochem

16 January 2016 21	Gazélec Ajaccio	2–2	Stade Reims	Ajaccio, Corsica
20:00 CET (UTC+01:00)	Boutaïb 2'; Đoković 72', (yellow card) 83'; Tshibumbu (yellow card) 73'	Report	De Préville 22', 31'	Stadium: Stade Ange Casanova; Attendance: 3,568; Referee: Johan Hamel

22 January 2016 22	Rennes	1–0	Gazélec Ajaccio	Rennes
20:30 CET (UTC+01:00)	Diagné (yellow card) 60'; M'Bengue (yellow card) 67'; Danzé (yellow card) 69'; Filippi 90+1' (o.g.)	Report	Coeff (yellow card) 45'; Lemoigne (yellow card) 62'; Đoković (yellow card) 69'	Stadium: Roazhon Park; Attendance: 18,022; Referee: Sébastien Moreira

30 January 2016 23	Gazélec Ajaccio	0–4	Montpellier	Ajaccio, Corsica
20:00 CET (UTC+01:00)	Đoković (yellow card) 8'; Lemoigne (yellow card) 26'; Touré (yellow card) 40'	Report	Dabo (yellow card) 8', (goal) 52', 57'; Yatabaré 14'; Camara (yellow card) 28'; Martin 41' (pen.), (yellow card) 42'	Stadium: Stade Ange Casanova; Attendance: 3,629; Referee: Bartolomeu Varela

3 February 2016 24	Nantes	3–1	Gazélec Ajaccio	Nantes
19:00 CET (UTC+01:00)	Sala 14'; Bedoya 23'; Gillet (yellow card) 45'; Adryan 58'	Report	Mayi 26'; Youga (red card) 51'; Mangane (yellow card) 56'	Stadium: Stade de la Beaujoire; Attendance: 24,799; Referee: Saïd Ennjimi

6 February 2016 25	Gazélec Ajaccio	0–0	Guingamp	Ajaccio, Corsica
20:00 CET (UTC+01:00)	Touré (yellow card) 18'	Report	Mathis (red card) 8'	Stadium: Stade Ange Casanova; Attendance: 3,569; Referee: Clément Turpin

13 February 2016 26	Gazélec Ajaccio	2–3	Troyes	Ajaccio, Corsica
20:00 CET (UTC+01:00)	Zoua 1'; Filippi (yellow card) 38'; Ducourtioux (yellow card) 48', (goal) 57'	Report	Ben Saada 8'; Nivet (yellow card) 30'; Azamoum 36', 43'; Martial (yellow card) 50'; Confais (yellow card) 53'	Stadium: Stade Ange Casanova; Attendance: 3,485; Referee: Nicolas Rainville

20 February 2016 27	Toulouse	1–1	Gazélec Ajaccio	Toulouse
20:00 CET (UTC+01:00)	Blin (yellow card) 82'; Braithwaite 90+1'	Report	Filippi (yellow card) 39'; Sylla (yellow card) 36' (yellow-red card) 79'; Ducourtioux (yellow card) 49'; Mayi 59'; Touré (yellow card) 87'	Stadium: Stade Municipal; Attendance: 19,173; Referee: Fredy Fautrel

5 March 2016 29	Bordeaux	1–1	Gazélec Ajaccio	Bordeaux
20:00 CET (UTC+01:00)	Pablo (yellow card) 9'; Diabaté 38' (pen.); Sané (yellow card) 63'	Report	Touré (yellow card) 4'; Mayi (yellow card) 58'; Larbi 89'	Stadium: Matmut Atlantique; Attendance: 17,603; Referee: Johan Hamel

9 March 2016 28	Gazélec Ajaccio	1–1	Marseille	Ajaccio, Corsica
18:30 CET (UTC+01:00)	Lemoigne (yellow card) 31'; Sylla (yellow card) 70'; Rekik 84' (o.g.)	Report	Romao (yellow card) 38'; Cabella (yellow card) 64', (goal) 79'	Stadium: Stade Ange Casanova; Attendance: 4,103; Referee: Stéphane Lannoy

12 March 2016 30	Gazélec Ajaccio	1–0	Caen	Ajaccio
20:00 CET (UTC+01:00)	Boutaïb 70'	Report		Stadium: Stade Ange Casanova; Attendance: 3,488; Referee: Bartolomeu Varela

20 March 2016 31	Nice	3–0	Gazélec Ajaccio	Nice
20:00 CET (UTC+01:00)	Ben Arfa 14'; Pléa 66'; Pied (yellow card) 70'; Seri 88'	Report	Touré (yellow card) 31'; Lemoigne (yellow card) 62'	Stadium: Allianz Riviera; Attendance: 19,066; Referee: Nicolas Rainville

2 April 2016 32	Gazélec Ajaccio	0–2	Saint-Étienne	Ajaccio
20:00 CET (UTC+01:00)	Boutaïb (yellow card) 25'	Report	Roux 15'; Théophile-Catherine 58'	Stadium: Stade Ange Casanova; Attendance: 3,665; Referee: Clément Turpin

9 April 2016 33	Angers	0–0	Gazélec Ajaccio	Angers
20:00 CET (UTC+01:00)	Mangani (yellow card) 18'	Report	Lemoigne (yellow card) 17'; Filippi (yellow card) 18'; Youga (yellow card) 51'; Poggi (yellow card) 56'; Sylla (yellow card) 79'	Stadium: Stade Jean-Bouin; Attendance: 11,474; Referee: Jérôme Miguelgorry

16 April 2016 34	Gazélec Ajaccio	2–4	Lille	Ajaccio
20:00 CET (UTC+01:00)	Pujol 41'; Lemoigne (yellow card) 45'; Mangane (yellow card) 45'; Filippi (yellow card) 50' (yellow-red card) 67'; Touré 86'	Report	Boufal 19', 74', 84'; Benzia (yellow card) 45'; Balmont (yellow card) 62'; Martinez 88' (o.g.)	Stadium: Stade Ange Casanova; Referee: François Letexier

24 April 2016 35	Gazélec Ajaccio	3–2	Bastia	Ajaccio
17:00 CET (UTC+01:00)	Ducourtioux (yellow card) 15'; Boutaïb 20'; Pujol 37', (yellow card) 76'; Larbi 63' (pen.); Lemoigne (yellow card) 90+1'; Đoković (yellow card) 90+3'	Report	Ngando 9'; Cahuzac (yellow card) 62', (goal) 77'; Cioni (yellow card) 90+3'	Stadium: Stade Ange Casanova; Attendance: 4,104; Referee: Sébastien Moreira

30 April 2016 36	Lyon	2–1	Gazélec Ajaccio	Lyon
20:00 CET (UTC+1)	Ghezzal 11'; Cornet 40'; Rafael (yellow card) 88'	Report	Tshibumbu (yellow card) 15'; Pujol 49'; Đoković (yellow card) 74'	Stadium: Parc Olympique Lyonnais; Attendance: 50,546; Referee: Nicolas Rainville

7 May 2016 37	Gazélec Ajaccio	0-4	Paris Saint-Germain	Ajaccio
21:00 CET (UTC+01:00)		Report		Stadium: Stade Ange Casanova; Attendance: 3,970; Referee: Mikael Lesage

14 May 2016 38	Lorient	1–0	Gazélec Ajaccio	Lorient
21:00 CET (UTC+01:00)		Report		Stadium: Stade du Moustoir; Attendance: 12,616; Referee: Benoît Millot

=== Coupe de la Ligue ===
25 November 2015 Round of 32	Gazélec Ajaccio	0–1 (a.e.t.)	Guingamp	Ajaccio, Corsica
18:30 CET (UTC+01:00)		Report	Sorbon (yellow card) 56'; Kerbrat (yellow card) 97'; Privat 104'	Stadium: Stade Ange Casanova; Attendance: 1,570; Referee: Mikael Lesage

=== Coupe de France ===
2 January 2016 Round of 64	Gazélec Ajaccio	2–0	Sainte-Marienne	Ajaccio, Corsica
13:30 CET (UTC+01:00)	Larbi 32'; Mayi (yellow card) 69' (goal) 80'	Report	Youssouf (yellow card) 78'	Stadium: Stade Ange Casanova; Attendance: 800; Referee: Lionel Jaffredo

19 January 2016 Round of 32	Gazélec Ajaccio	3–0	Guingamp	Ajaccio, Corsica
18:00 CET (UTC+01:00)	Boutaïb 5', 21', 49', (yellow card) 85'	Report	Coco (yellow card) 10'; Mathis (yellow card) 45'	Stadium: Stade Ange Casanova; Attendance: 2,000; Referee: Ruddy Buquet

9 February 2016 Round of 16	Saint-Malo	1–2	Gazélec Ajaccio	Guingamp
21:00 CET (UTC+01:00)	Creac'h 34'	Report	Mayi 61'; Youga (yellow card) 62'; Boutaïb 78'	Stadium: Stade du Roudourou; Attendance: 7,016; Referee: Stéphane Jochem

2 March 2016 Quarter-final	Lorient	3–0	Gazélec Ajaccio	Lorient
19:00 CET (UTC+01:00)	Philippoteaux 9'; N'Dong (yellow card) 32'; Barthelme 43'; Paye 90'	Report	Tshibumbu (yellow card) 22'; Filippi (yellow card) 45' (red card)	Stadium: Stade du Moustoir; Attendance: 10,000; Referee: Benoît Millot
