= 2015–16 Olympique Lyonnais season =

Lyon
2015–16 season
- Owner: OL Groupe
- Chairman: Jean-Michel Aulas
- Manager: Bruno Génésio
- Stadium: Stade de Gerland (2015); Parc Olympique Lyonnais (2016)
- Ligue 1: 2nd
- Trophée des Champions: Runners-up
- Coupe de la Ligue: Quarter-finals
- Coupe de France: Round of 16
- UEFA Champions League: Group stage
- Top goalscorer: League: Alexandre Lacazette (21); All: Alexandre Lacazette (23)
- Highest home attendance: 56,661 vs Paris Saint-Germain (29 February 2016)
- Lowest home attendance: 15,835 vs Tours (16 December 2015)
Home colours	Away colours	Third colours

The 2015–16 season was Olympique Lyonnais's 66th professional season since its creation in 1950.

== Players ==
French teams are limited to four players without EU citizenship. Hence, the squad list includes only the principal nationality of each player; several non-European players on the squad have dual citizenship with an EU country. Also, players from the ACP countries—countries in Africa, the Caribbean, and the Pacific that are signatories to the Cotonou Agreement—are not counted against non-EU quotas due to the Kolpak ruling.

=== Current squad ===
Note: Flags indicate national team as defined under FIFA eligibility rules; some limited exceptions apply. Players may hold more than one non-FIFA nationality.

No.	Pos.	Nation	Player
1	GK	POR	Anthony Lopes
2	DF	FRA	Mapou Yanga-Mbiwa
3	DF	CMR	Henri Bedimo
4	DF	BFA	Bakary Koné
6	MF	FRA	Gueïda Fofana
7	FW	FRA	Clément Grenier
8	MF	FRA	Corentin Tolisso
10	FW	FRA	Alexandre Lacazette
11	MF	ALG	Rachid Ghezzal
12	MF	FRA	Jordan Ferri
13	DF	FRA	Christophe Jallet

No.	Pos.	Nation	Player
14	MF	ESP	Sergi Darder
15	DF	FRA	Jérémy Morel
17	MF	FRA	Steed Malbranque
18	FW	FRA	Nabil Fekir
19	MF	FRA	Mathieu Valbuena
20	DF	BRA	Rafael
21	MF	FRA	Maxime Gonalons (Captain)
23	DF	FRA	Samuel Umtiti
27	FW	FRA	Maxwel Cornet
28	MF	COD	Arnold Mvuemba
30	GK	FRA	Mathieu Gorgelin

=== Out on loan ===
Note: Flags indicate national team as defined under FIFA eligibility rules; some limited exceptions apply. Players may hold more than one non-FIFA nationality.

No.	Pos.	Nation	Player
22	DF	FRA	Lindsay Rose (at Lorient until 30 June 2016)
31	DF	FRA	Louis Nganioni (at Utrecht until 30 June 2016)

== Transfers ==
=== Transfers in ===
Date	Pos.	Player	Age	Moved from	Fee	Notes
1 July 2015	FW	(Guadeloupe) Claudio Beauvue	27	(France) Guingamp	£3.5 million	
1 July 2015	DF	(France) Jérémy Morel	31	(France) Marseille	Free Transfer	
3 August 2015	DF	(Brazil) Rafael Da Silva	25	(England) Manchester United	Undisclosed	
11 August 2015	MF	(France) Mathieu Valbuena	30	(Russia) Dynamo Moscow	€5 million	
17 August 2015	DF	(France) Mapou Yanga-Mbiwa	26	(Italy) Roma	€7.9 million	
29 August 2015	MF	(Spain) Sergi Darder	21	(Spain) Málaga	€12 million	
31 August 2015	MF	(France) Olivier Kemen	19	(England) Newcastle United	£490,000	
31 August 2015	MF	(France) Lucas Tousart	18	(France) Valenciennes	Undisclosed	

=== Loans in ===
Date	Pos.	Player	Age	Loaned from	Return date	Notes

=== Transfers out ===
Date	Pos.	Player	Age	Moved to	Fee	Notes
1 July 2015	MF	(France) Farès Bahlouli	20	(France) Monaco	Undisclosed	
1 July 2015	GK	(Switzerland) Jérémy Frick	22	(Switzerland) Biel-Bienne	Undisclosed	
1 July 2015	MF	(France) Yoann Gourcuff	28	(France) Rennes	Free transfer	
1 July 2015	DF	(France) Mouhamadou Dabo	28	(France) Troyes	Free transfer	
1 July 2015	MF	(Mali) Sidy Koné	23	Released		
17 July 2015	FW	(Guinea) Mohamed Yattara	21	(Belgium) Standard Liège	€2 million	
12 August 2015	DF	(Algeria) Mehdi Zeffane	23	(France) Rennes	Undisclosed	
15 August 2015	FW	(Cameroon) Clinton N'Jie	22	(England) Tottenham Hotspur	Undisclosed	
31 August 2015	FW	(France) Yassine Benzia	20	(France) Lille	Undisclosed	
6 January 2016	DF	(Serbia) Milan Biševac	32	(Italy) Lazio	Undisclosed	
16 January 2016	FW	(Guadeloupe) Claudio Beauvue	27	(Spain) Celta Vigo	Undisclosed	

=== Loans out ===
Date	Pos.	Player	Age	Loaned to	Return date	Notes
10 July 2015	DF	(France) Louis Nganioni	20	(Netherlands) Utrecht	30 June 2016	
28 January 2016	DF	(France) Lindsay Rose	23	(France) Lorient	30 June 2016	

== Pre-season and friendlies ==
11 July 2015 Friendly	Sion (Switzerland)	1–0	(France) Lyon	Paris, France
18:50 CEST (UTC+02:00)	Carlitos 22'	Report

15 July 2015 Friendly	Lyon (France)	0–2	(Netherlands) PSV	Aix-les-Bains, France
18:30 CEST (UTC+02:00)		Report	Locadia 77' (pen.), 89'	Stadium: Stade Municipal Jacques Forestier

18 July 2015 Friendly	Lyon (France)	2–1	(Italy) Milan	Lyon, France
19:50 CEST (UTC+02:00)	Fekir 24'; Lacazette 80'	Report	Poli 75'	Stadium: Stade de Gerland; Referee: Bartolomeu Varela

25 July 2015 2015 Emirates Cup	Arsenal (England)	6–0	(France) Lyon	London, England
16:20 BST	Giroud 29'; Oxlade-Chamberlain 34'; Iwobi 35'; Ramsey 38'; Özil 62'; Cazorla 84'	Report		Stadium: Emirates Stadium

26 July 2015 2015 Emirates Cup	Lyon (France)	0–2	(Spain) Villarreal	London, England
14:00 BST			Bruno 31'; Baptistão 54'	Stadium: Emirates Stadium

== Competitions ==
=== Trophée des Champions ===
1 August 2015 Final	Paris Saint-Germain	2–0	Lyon	Montreal, Quebec, Canada
21:00 CEST (UTC+02:00)	Aurier 11'; Cavani 17'; Verratti (yellow card) 60'; David Luiz (yellow card) 81'	Report	Gonalons (yellow card) 37' (yellow-red card) 64'	Stadium: Stade Saputo; Attendance: 20,057; Referee: Mathieu Bourdeau

=== Ligue 1 ===
==== League table ====
Pos	Team	Pld	W	D	L	GF	GA	GD	Pts	Qualification or relegation
1	Paris Saint-Germain (C)	38	30	6	2	102	19	+83	96	Qualification for the Champions League group stage
2	Lyon	38	19	8	11	67	43	+24	65	Qualification for the Champions League group stage
3	Monaco	38	17	14	7	57	50	+7	65	Qualification for the Champions League third qualifying round
4	Nice	38	18	9	11	58	41	+17	63	Qualification for the Europa League group stage (Note: Since the winners of the 2015–16 Coupe de France and the 2015–16 Coupe de la Ligue, Paris Saint-Germain, qualified for European competition based on their league position, the spot awarded to the Coupe de France winners (Europa League group stage) was passed to the fourth-placed team and the spot awarded to the Coupe de la Ligue winners (Europa League third qualifying round) was passed to the sixth-placed team. The fifth-placed team received the spot in Europa League third qualifying round originally designated to the fourth-placed team.)
5	Lille	38	15	15	8	39	27	+12	60	Qualification for the Europa League third qualifying round

Source: Ligue 1, Soccerway
Rules for classification: 1) Points; 2) Goal difference; 3) Goals scored; 4) Head-to-head points; 5) Head-to-head goal difference; 6) Fairplay ranking.
(C) Champions

==== Results summary ====
Overall								Home						Away					
Pld	W	D	L	GF	GA	GD	Pts	W	D	L	GF	GA	GD	W	D	L	GF	GA	GD
38	19	8	11	67	43	+24	65	12	4	3	42	16	+26	7	4	8	25	27	−2

Last updated: 15 April 2016.
Source: Competitive matches

==== Results by round ====
Round	1	2	3	4	5	6	7	8	9	10	11	12	13	14	15	16	17	18	19	20	21	22	23	24	25	26	27	28	29	30	31	32	33	34	35	36	37	38
Ground	H	A	H	A	H	A	H	A	H	A	H	A	H	A	H	A	H	A	A	H	A	H	A	H	A	H	A	H	H	A	H	A	A	H	A	H	H	A
Result	D	W	L	W	D	D	W	L	W	D	W	W	W	L	L	D	L	L	L	W	L	D	L	W	W	W	L	W	W	D	W	W	W	D	W	W	W	L
Position	10	7	12	5	6	7	4	8	6	6	4	2	2	2	4	4	5	6	9	6	9	9	11	10	6	5	5	3	3	4	4	3	2	3	2	2	2	2

Source: Ligue1
A = Away; H = Home; W = Win; D = Draw; L = Loss

==== Matches ====
Win Draw Loss

9 August 2015 1	Lyon	0–0	Lorient	Lyon
21:00 CEST (UTC+02:00)	Ferri (yellow card) 51'	Report	Lautoa (yellow card) 32'; Bellugou (yellow card) 81'	Stadium: Stade de Gerland; Attendance: 28,116; Referee: Benoît Millot

15 August 2015 2	Guingamp	0–1	Lyon	Guingamp
20:00 CEST (UTC+02:00)	Diallo (yellow card) 29'; De Pauw (yellow card) 37'	Report	Rafael (yellow card) 68'; Umtiti (yellow card) 70'; Beauvue 79'	Stadium: Stade du Roudourou; Attendance: 17,728; Referee: Antony Gautier

22 August 2015 3	Lyon	1–2	Rennes	Lyon
17:00 CEST (UTC+02:00)	Fekir 12', (yellow card) 85'	Report	Pedro Henrique 7', (yellow card) 59'; Diagné (yellow card) 48'; Zefanne 56'; Fernandes (yellow card) 58'	Stadium: Stade de Gerland; Attendance: 31,470; Referee: Ruddy Buquet

29 August 2015 4	Caen	0–4	Lyon	Caen
17:00 CEST (UTC+02:00)	Alhadhur (yellow card) 67'; Da Silva (red card) 73'	Report	Fekir 19', 44', 57'; Beauvue 87'	Stadium: Stade Michel d'Ornano; Attendance: 19,795; Referee: Nicolas Rainville

12 September 2015 5	Lyon	0–0	Lille	Lyon
17:00 CEST (UTC+02:00)	Valbuena (yellow card) 90'	Report	Balmont (yellow card) 26'; Civelli (yellow card) 38'; Corchia (yellow card) 68'; Tallo (yellow card) 90+2'	Stadium: Stade de Gerland; Attendance: 32,137; Referee: Franck Schneider

20 September 2015 6	Marseille	1–1	Lyon	Marseille
21:00 CEST (UTC+02:00)	Cabella (yellow card) 13'; Rekik (yellow card) 21', (goal) 68'; Mandanda (yellow card) 24'; Alessandrini (red card) 44'; Mendy (yellow card) 61'	Report	Lacazette 25' (pen.); Jallet (yellow card) 79'	Stadium: Stade Vélodrome; Attendance: 56,194; Referee: Ruddy Buquet

23 September 2015 7	Lyon	2–0	Bastia	Lyon
19:00 CEST (UTC+02:00)	Kalulu 18'; Umtiti (yellow card) 45'; Biševac (yellow card) 53'; Tolisso 88'	Report	Kamano (red card) 45'; Cahuzac (yellow card) 69'	Stadium: Stade de Gerland; Attendance: 25,658; Referee: Benoit Bastien

26 September 2015 8	Bordeaux	3–1	Lyon	Bordeaux
20:00 CEST (UTC+02:00)	Khazri 17'; Chantôme (yellow card) 26'; Plašil 40'; Pablo 45+2', (yellow card) 71'	Report	Beauvue 78'	Stadium: Nouveau Stade de Bordeaux; Attendance: 26,593; Referee: Benoît Millot

3 October 2015 9	Lyon	1–0	Reims	Lyon
17:30 CEST (UTC+02:00)	Lacazette 44', (yellow card) 56'; Ghezzal (yellow card) 88'	Report	Signorino (yellow card) 84'; Oniangue (yellow card) 85'	Stadium: Stade de Gerland; Attendance: 30,089; Referee: Antony Gautier

16 October 2015 10	Monaco	1–1	Lyon	Fontvieille
20:30 CEST (UTC+02:00)	Traoré (yellow card) 2'; Pašalić 39'; Wallace (red card) 65'; Silva (yellow card) 87'	Report	Yanga-Mbiwa (yellow card) 9'; Rafael 84'; Umtiti (yellow card) 87'	Stadium: Stade Louis II; Attendance: 9,513; Referee: Fredy Fautrel

23 October 2015 11	Lyon	3–0	Toulouse	Lyon
20:30 CEST (UTC+02:00)	Darder 18'; Morel (yellow card) 51'; Valbuena 69'; Cornet 90+4'	Report	Moubandje (yellow card) 29'; Bodiger (yellow card) 31'; Akpa Akpro (yellow card) 44'; Trejo (yellow card) 50'	Stadium: Stade de Gerland; Attendance: 32,327; Referee: Nicolas Rainville

31 October 2015 12	Troyes	0–1	Lyon	Troyes
20:00 CET (UTC+01:00)	Jean (red card) 36'; Camus (yellow card) 78'; Mavinga (yellow card) 90+5'	Report	Gonalons (yellow card) 4'; Beauvue 78' (pen.)	Stadium: Stade de l'Aube; Attendance: 14,877; Referee: Stéphane Jochem

8 November 2015 13	Lyon	3–0	Saint-Étienne	Lyon
21:00 CET (UTC+01:00)	Rafael (yellow card) 33'; Lacazette 41', 59', 90+3'; Ferri (yellow card) 78'; Lopes (yellow card) 80'; Valbuena (yellow card) 84'	Report	Pajot (yellow card) 1'; Lemoine (yellow card) 6'; Hamouma (yellow card) 72'; Clément (yellow card) 86'	Stadium: Stade de Gerland; Attendance: 38,752; Referee: Tony Chapron

20 November 2015 14	Nice	3–0	Lyon	Nice
20:30 CET (UTC+01:00)	Germain 20'; Genevois (yellow card) 24'; Yanga-Mbiwa 48' (o.g.); Koziello 71'	Report	Ferri (yellow card) 26'; Morel (yellow card) 85'	Stadium: Allianz Riviera; Attendance: 17,872; Referee: Benoît Bastien

27 November 2015 15	Lyon	2–4	Montpellier	Lyon
20:30 CET (UTC+01:00)	Lacazette (yellow card) 12', (goal) 14'; Rafael (yellow card) 41'; Gonalons (yellow card) 68'; Ghezzal 84'	Report	Gonalons 8' (o.g.); Ninga 11', 48'; Bensebaini (yellow card) 20'; Rémy (yellow card) 45'; Dabo (yellow card) 48'; Hilton (yellow card) 57'; Camara 80'	Stadium: Stade de Gerland; Attendance: 29,960; Referee: Benoît Millot

1 December 2015 16	Nantes	0–0	Lyon	Nantes
21:00 CET (UTC+01:00)	Sabaly (yellow card) 17'	Report	Rafael (yellow card) 14'; Ghezzal (yellow card) 81'	Stadium: Stade de la Beaujoire; Attendance: 20,896; Referee: Amaury Delerue

5 December 2015 17	Lyon	0–2	Angers	Lyon
17:00 CET (UTC+01:00)	Tolisso (yellow card) 32'; Valbuena (yellow card) 73'; Darder (yellow card) 84'	Report	N'Doye 17', 81'; Saïss (yellow card) 30'	Stadium: Stade de Gerland; Attendance: 36,068; Referee: Lionel Jaffredo

13 December 2015 18	Paris Saint-Germain	5–1	Lyon	Paris
21:00 CET (UTC+01:00)	Ibrahimović 11', 77' (pen.); Aurier 17'; David Luiz (yellow card) 25'; Motta (yellow card) 58'; Cavani 61'; Lucas 90+1'	Report	Cornet (yellow card) 22'; Ferri 24'	Stadium: Parc des Princes; Attendance: 46,650; Referee: Ruddy Buquet

20 December 2015 19	Gazélec Ajaccio	2–1	Lyon	Ajaccio, Corsica
17:00 CET (UTC+01:00)	Mangane (yellow card) 21'; Larbi 32', 67'; Tshibumbu (yellow card) 83'; Boutaïb (yellow card) 90+1'	Report	Grenier 72', (yellow card) 82'	Stadium: Stade Ange Casanova; Attendance: 4,125; Referee: Amaury Delerue

9 January 2016 20	Lyon	4–1	Troyes	Lyon
17:00 CET (UTC+01:00)	Lacazette 18'; Umtiti (yellow card) 62'; Ghezzal 72'; Ferri 81'; Beauvue 90'	Report	Nivet (yellow card) 22'; Camus 67'	Stadium: Parc Olympique Lyonnais; Attendance: 55,169; Referee: Wilfrid Bien

17 January 2016 21	Saint-Étienne	1–0	Lyon	Saint Étienne
21:00 CET (UTC+01:00)	Monnet-Paquet (yellow card) 18'; Lemoine (yellow card) 48'; Pajot (yellow card) 62'; Søderlund 76'	Report	Ghezzal (yellow card) 77'	Stadium: Stade Geoffroy-Guichard; Attendance: 36,503; Referee: Clément Turpin

24 January 2016 22	Lyon	1–1	Marseille	Lyon
21:00 CET (UTC+01:00)	Morel (yellow card) 52'; Tolisso 78'; Yanga-Mbiwa (yellow card) 87'	Report	Batshuayi (yellow card) 53'; Cabella 64'; Manquillo (yellow card) 78'	Stadium: Parc Olympique Lyonnais; Attendance: 56,506; Referee: Antony Gautier

30 January 2016 23	Bastia	1–0	Lyon	Furiani
20:00 CET (UTC+01:00)	Kamano (yellow card) 26'; Ngando (yellow card) 67'; Brandão 69', (yellow card) 75'; Cioni (red card) 88'	Report	Tolisso (yellow card) 31'; Umtiti (yellow card) 89'	Stadium: Stade Armand Cesari; Attendance: 10,908; Referee: Benoît Millot

3 February 2016 24	Lyon	3–0	Bordeaux	Lyon
19:00 CET (UTC+01:00)	Lacazette (yellow card) 40', (goal) 41', 87'; Ferri (yellow card) 81'; Kalulu (yellow card) 90+3'	Report	Vada (yellow card) 7'; Chantôme (yellow card) 24'; Crivelli (yellow card) 76'; Rolán (yellow card) 76'	Stadium: Parc Olympique Lyonnais; Attendance: 30,143; Referee: Fredy Fautrel

6 February 2016 25	Angers	0–3	Lyon	Angers
17:00 CET (UTC+01:00)	Mangani (red card) 16'; N'Doye (yellow card) 61'	Report	Jallet 13', (yellow card) 61'; Ghezzal 46'; Gonalons (yellow card) 65'; Tolisso 81'	Stadium: Stade Jean-Bouin; Attendance: 15,386; Referee: Frank Schneider

13 February 2016 26	Lyon	4–1	Caen	Lyon
14:00 CET (UTC+01:00)	Umtiti 8'; Lacazette 16'; Cornet 45', (yellow card) 46'; Gonalons (yellow card) 56'; Ferri (yellow card) 72'; Tolisso 83'	Report	Da Silva (yellow card) 7'; Bessat (yellow card) 28'; Delort 58'; Nkololo (yellow card) 64'; Yahia (yellow card) 68'; Seube (yellow card) 69'	Stadium: Parc Olympique Lyonnais; Attendance: 38,624; Referee: Ruddy Buquet

21 February 2016 27	Lille	1–0	Lyon	Villeneuve d'Ascq
21:00 CET (UTC+01:00)	Boufal 28'; Mavuba (yellow card) 29'; Soumaoro (yellow card) 43'; Amadou (yellow card) 63'; Bauthéac (yellow card) 66'; Enyeama (yellow card) 90'	Report	Grenier (yellow card) 29' (yellow-red card) 87'; Jallet (yellow card) 40' (yellow-red card) 60'; Ferri (yellow card) 61'; Valbuena (yellow card) 71'; Yanga-Mbiwa (yellow card) 75'	Stadium: Stade Pierre-Mauroy; Attendance: 32,956; Referee: Benoît Bastien

28 February 2016 28	Lyon	2–1	Paris Saint-Germain	Lyon
21:00 CET (UTC+01:00)	Cornet 13'; Yanga-Mbiwa (yellow card) 43'; Darder 45+2'; Ferri (yellow card) 72'; Rafael (yellow card) 73'	Report	Motta (yellow card) 23'; Lucas 51', (yellow card) 89'; Van der Wiel (yellow card) 58'; Cavani (yellow card) 63'; Rabiot (yellow card) 74'	Stadium: Parc Olympique Lyonnais; Attendance: 56,661; Referee: Lionel Jaffredo

6 March 2016 29	Lyon	5–1	Guingamp	Lyon
21:00 CET (UTC+1)	Ghezzal 3'; Lacazette (yellow card) 13', (goal) 17', 61'; Cornet 35'; Grenier (yellow card) 82'; Lemaitre 86' (o.g.)	Report	Erdinç 11'; Mathis (yellow card) 13'; Angoua (yellow card) 14'; Diallo (yellow card) 60'	Stadium: Parc Olympique Lyonnais; Attendance: 33,133; Referee: Fredy Fautrel

13 March 2016 30	Rennes	2–2	Lyon	Rennes
21:00 CET (UTC+1)	Mendes (yellow card) 12'; Pedro Henrique (yellow card) 20'; Fernandes (yellow card) 50'; Dembélé (yellow card) 53'; Diagné (yellow card) 65', (goal) 70'; Rafael 82' (o.g.)	Report	Rafael (yellow card) 19'; Gonalons (yellow card) 32'; Ghezzal 33', (yellow card) 71'; Koné (yellow card) 53'; Lacazette 55'	Stadium: Roazhon Park; Attendance: 25,830; Referee: Frank Schneider

19 March 2016 31	Lyon	2–0	Nantes	Lyon
21:00 CET (UTC+1)	Rafael (yellow card) 67'; Perrin 83'; Lacazette 90+4' (pen.)	Report	Bedoya (yellow card) 42'; Cana (yellow card) 64'	Stadium: Parc Olympique Lyonnais; Attendance: 47,505; Referee: Benoît Millot

3 April 2016 32	Lorient	1–3	Lyon	Lorient
21:00 CET (UTC+1)	Waris 36'	Report	Lacazette 44', 84'; Ghezzal 81'	Stadium: Stade du Moustoir; Attendance: 15,132; Referee: Fredy Fautrel

8 April 2016 33	Montpellier	0–2	Lyon	Montpellier
20:30 CET (UTC+1)	Saihi (yellow card) 38'	Report	Cornet 34', 40', (yellow card) 66'; Ferri (yellow card) 68'	Stadium: Stade de la Mosson; Attendance: 15,066; Referee: Antony Gautier

15 April 2016 34	Lyon	1–1	Nice	Lyon
20:30 CET (UTC+1)	Germain 18'	Report	Cornet (red card) 25'; Lacazette (yellow card) 45'	Stadium: Parc Olympique Lyonnais; Attendance: 55,744; Referee: Lionel Jaffredo

23 April 2016 35	Toulouse	2–3	Lyon	Toulouse
17:30 CET (UTC+1)	Regattin (yellow card) 34'; Tisserand 50'; Ben Yedder 82'; Sirieix (yellow card) 83'	Report	Valbuena (yellow card) 13'; Grenier 73'; Lacazette 80'; Lopes (yellow card) 83'; Toliso 85', (yellow card) 90+4'	Stadium: Stadium Municipal; Attendance: 24,316; Referee: Clément Turpin

30 April 2016 36	Lyon	2–1	Gazélec Ajaccio	Lyon
20:00 CET (UTC+1)	Ghezzal 11'; Cornet 40'; Rafael (yellow card) 88'	Report	Tshibumbu (yellow card) 15'; Pujol 49'; Đoković (yellow card) 74'	Stadium: Parc Olympique Lyonnais; Attendance: 50,546; Referee: Nicolas Rainville

7 May 2016 37	Lyon	6–1	Monaco	Lyon
21:00 CET (UTC+1)	Ghezzal 3'; Lacazette 8', 35', 80'; Yanga-Mbiwa 34', 59'		Carvalho 41'	Stadium: Parc Olympique Lyonnais; Attendance: 56,696; Referee: Ruddy Buquet

14 May 2016 38	Reims	4–1	Lyon	Reims
20:00 CET (UTC+1)	Mandi 14', (yellow card) 41'; Kyei (yellow card) 27', (goal) 56' (pen.); Diego (yellow card) 34'; Fofana (yellow card) 42'; Turan 51', (yellow card) 85'; Kankava (yellow card) 53'	Report	Gonalons (yellow card) 25'; Umtiti (yellow card) 55'; Cornet 63'	Stadium: Stade Auguste Delaune; Attendance: 17,432; Referee: Amaury Delerue

=== Coupe de France ===
3 January 2016 Round of 64	Limoges	0–7	Lyon	Buxerolles
14:15 CET (UTC+01:00)	Machado (yellow card) 6'	Report	Cornet 2', 37'; Beauvue 50'; Ghezzal 57', 61'; Darder 71'; Tolisso 76'	Stadium: Stade Michel Amand; Attendance: 9,671; Referee: Bartolomeu Varela

20 January 2016 Round of 32	Chambly	0–2	Lyon	Chambly
18:30 CET (UTC+01:00)	Heinry (yellow card) 35'; Doucouré (yellow card) 55'	Report	Cornet 20'; Valbuena 22'	Stadium: Stade Pierre Brisson; Attendance: 8,500; Referee: Stéphane Jochem

10 February 2016 Round of 16	Paris Saint-Germain	3–0	Lyon	Paris
21:05 CET (UTC+01:00)	Ibrahimović 63', 67'; Rabiot 75'; David Luiz (yellow card) 78'	Report	Umtiti (yellow card) 29'	Stadium: Parc des Princes; Attendance: 42,000; Referee: Clément Turpin

=== Coupe de la Ligue ===
16 December 2015 Round of 16	Lyon	2–1	Tours	Lyon
20:00 CET (UTC+01:00)	Beauvue 38' (pen.); Ferri (yellow card) 45'; Malbranque 85'	Report	Bouhours (yellow card) 64'; Tandia 72'; Kouakou (yellow card) 87'	Stadium: Stade de Gerland; Attendance: 15,835; Referee: Sébastien Moreira

13 January 2016 Quarter-finals	Paris Saint-Germain	2–1	Lyon	Paris
21:00 CET (UTC+01:00)	Rabiot 17'; Lucas 73'	Report	Tolisso 42'	Stadium: Parc des Princes; Attendance: 47,267; Referee: Benoît Bastien

=== UEFA Champions League ===
==== Group stage ====
Pos	Team	Pld	W	D	L	GF	GA	GD	Pts	Qualification	ZEN	GNT	VAL	LYO
1	(Russia) Zenit Saint Petersburg	6	5	0	1	13	6	+7	15	Advance to knockout phase	—	2–1	2–0	3–1
2	(Belgium) Gent	6	3	1	2	8	7	+1	10	Advance to knockout phase	2–1	—	1–0	1–1
3	(Spain) Valencia	6	2	0	4	5	9	−4	6	Transfer to Europa League	2–3	2–1	—	0–2
4	(France) Lyon	6	1	1	4	5	9	−4	4		0–2	1–2	0–1	—

Source: UEFA
Rules for classification: Group stage tiebreakers

16 September 2015 1	Gent (Belgium)	1–1	(France) Lyon	Ghent, Belgium
20:45 CEST (UTC+02:00)	Dejaegere (red card) 41'; Milićević 68'; Depoitre (yellow card) 71'; Foket (red card) 87'	Report	Ferri (yellow card) 11'; Jallet 58'; Umtiti (yellow card) 71'; Lacazette (penalty missed) 88'; Malbranque (yellow card) 90+1'	Stadium: Ghelamco Arena; Attendance: 19,601; Referee: William Collum (Scotland)

29 September 2015 2	Lyon (France)	0–1	(Spain) Valencia	Lyon, France
20:45 CEST (UTC+02:00)	Gonalons (yellow card) 61'; Kalulu (yellow card) 67'; Ferri (yellow card) 90+2'	Report	Feghouli 42'; Fuego (yellow card) 52'; Pérez (yellow card) 63'; Domènech (yellow card) 90+1'	Stadium: Stade de Gerland; Attendance: 33,534; Referee: Milorad Mažić (Serbia)

20 October 2015 3	Zenit Saint Petersburg (Russia)	3–1	(France) Lyon	Saint Petersburg, Russia
20:45 CEST (UTC+02:00)	Dzyuba 3'; Hulk (yellow card) 6', (goal) 56'; García (yellow card) 52'; Danny 82'	Report	Gonalons (yellow card) 39'; Rafael (yellow card) 46'; Lacazette 49'; Umtiti (yellow card) 52'; Yanga-Mbiwa (yellow card) 90+2'	Stadium: Petrovsky Stadium; Attendance: 17,517; Referee: Martin Atkinson (England)

4 November 2015 4	Lyon (France)	0–2	(Russia) Zenit Saint Petersburg	Lyon, France
20:45 CET (UTC+01:00)	Gonalons (yellow card) 32' (yellow-red card) 72'	Report	Witsel (yellow card) 20'; Dzyuba 25', 57'; Criscito (yellow card) 46'; García (yellow card) 54'; Anyukov (yellow card) 56' (yellow-red card) 88'; Danny (yellow card) 74'; Shatov (yellow card) 90'	Stadium: Stade de Gerland; Attendance: 30,173; Referee: Felix Brych (Germany)

24 November 2015 5	Lyon (France)	1–2	(Belgium) Gent	Lyon, France
20:45 CET (UTC+01:00)	Ferri 7', (yellow card) 48'; Bedimo (yellow card) 38'	Report	Nielsen (yellow card) 16'; Neto (yellow card) 25'; Milićević 32'; Foket (yellow card) 58'; Kums (yellow card) 75'; Asare (yellow card) 87'; Coulibaly 90+5'	Stadium: Stade de Gerland; Attendance: 30,206; Referee: Sergei Karasev (Russia)

9 December 2015 6	Valencia (Spain)	0–2	(France) Lyon	Valencia, Spain
20:45 CET (UTC+01:00)	Abdennour (yellow card) 24'; Mustafi (yellow card) 38'; Mina (yellow card) 44'	Report	Cornet 37'; Tolisso (yellow card) 68'; Lacazette 76'	Stadium: Mestalla; Attendance: 32,494; Referee: Matej Jug (Slovenia)

== Statistics ==
=== Appearances and goals ===
No.	Pos	Nat	Player	Total		Ligue 1		Trophée des Champions		Coupe de France		Coupe de la Ligue		UEFA Champions League	
No.	Pos	Nat	Player	Apps	Goals	Apps	Goals	Apps	Goals	Apps	Goals	Apps	Goals	Apps	Goals
Goalkeepers
1	GK	(Portugal) POR	Anthony Lopes	47	0	37	0	1	0	3	0	0	0	6	0
30	GK	(France) FRA	Mathieu Gorgelin	3	0	1	0	0	0	0	0	2	0	0	0
Defenders
2	DF	(France) FRA	Mapou Yanga-Mbiwa	35	2	27	2	0	0	2	0	0+1	0	5	0
3	DF	(Cameroon) CMR	Henri Bedimo	22	0	14+4	0	1	0	0	0	0	0	3	0
4	DF	(Burkina Faso) BFA	Bakary Koné	12	0	4+2	0	1	0	2	0	2	0	0+1	0
13	DF	(France) FRA	Christophe Jallet	32	2	20+3	1	1	0	2	0	2	0	3+1	1
15	DF	(France) FRA	Jérémy Morel	40	0	27+4	0	0	0	3	0	2	0	4	0
20	DF	(Brazil) BRA	Rafael	27	1	18+3	1	0	0	1	0	0	0	4+1	0
23	DF	(France) FRA	Samuel Umtiti	38	1	30	1	1	0	2	0	1	0	4	0
Midfielders
6	MF	(France) FRA	Gueïda Fofana	0	0	0	0	0	0	0	0	0	0	0	0
8	MF	(France) FRA	Corentin Tolisso	45	7	28+5	5	1	0	2+1	1	2	1	6	0
11	MF	(Algeria) ALG	Rachid Ghezzal	38	10	16+13	8	0+1	0	2	2	2	0	1+3	0
12	MF	(France) FRA	Jordan Ferri	44	3	26+8	2	1	0	0+2	0	2	0	3+2	1
14	MF	(Spain) ESP	Sergi Darder	35	3	18+8	2	0	0	3	1	2	0	3+1	0
17	MF	(France) FRA	Steed Malbranque	15	0	5+6	0	0+1	0	0	0	0+1	0	1+1	0
19	MF	(France) FRA	Mathieu Valbuena	33	2	21+5	1	0	0	1+1	1	0	0	5	0
21	MF	(France) FRA	Maxime Gonalons	43	0	33	0	1	0	3	0	1	0	5	0
24	MF	(France) FRA	Olivier Kemen	2	0	1+1	0	0	0	0	0	0	0	0	0
26	MF	(France) FRA	Aldo Kalulu	14	2	1+9	2	0	0	0+2	0	0	0	1+1	0
28	MF	(France) FRA	Arnold Mvuemba	9	0	3+3	0	0	0	0+2	0	1	0	0	0
29	MF	(France) FRA	Lucas Tousart	1	0	1	0	0	0	0	0	0	0	0	0
32	MF	(France) FRA	Zakarie Labidi	3	0	0+3	0	0	0	0	0	0	0	0	0
Forwards
7	FW	(France) FRA	Clément Grenier	23	2	10+8	2	0	0	1+1	0	0+2	0	1	0
10	FW	(France) FRA	Alexandre Lacazette	44	23	34	21	1	0	2	0	0+1	0	6	2
18	FW	(France) FRA	Nabil Fekir	9	4	5+4	4	0	0	0	0	0	0	0	0
22	FW	(France) FRA	Gaëtan Perrin	3	1	0+3	1	0	0	0	0	0	0	0	0
27	FW	(France) FRA	Maxwel Cornet	40	12	16+15	8	0	0	3	3	1+1	0	1+3	1
36	FW	(France) FRA	Romain Del Castillo	2	0	0+2	0	0	0	0	0	0	0	0	0
Players transferred out during the season
5	DF	(Serbia) SRB	Milan Biševac	8	0	6	0	0	0	0	0	0	0	2	0
9	FW	(France) FRA	Claudio Beauvue	29	8	15+4	5	1	0	1	1	2	2	2+4	0
22	DF	(France) FRA	Lindsay Rose	1	0	1	0	0	0	0	0	0	0	0	0
25	FW	(Algeria) ALG	Yassine Benzia	1	0	0	0	1	0	0	0	0	0	0	0

Last updated: 14 May 2016
Source: Competitions
