= Yohan Bocognano =

French professional footballer (born 1990)

Personal information
- Date of birth: 16 June 1990 (age 36)
- Place of birth: Ajaccio, France
- Height: 1.85 m (6 ft 1 in)
- Position: Defender

Team information
- Current team: FC Bastelicaccia

Senior career*
Years	Team	Apps	(Gls)
2008–2009	Ajaccio (B team)		
2009–2011	Nîmes	22	(0)
2011–2013	Gazélec Ajaccio	56	(7)
2013	Istres	8	(0)
2014–2015	Inter Baku	35	(1)
2015–2016	Tubize	10	(1)
2016–2017	CA Propriano	-	(-)
2017	Mulhouse	8	(0)
2017–2018	Bastia-Borgo	23	(1)
2018–2022	Bastia	96	(13)
2022	Gazélec Ajaccio	5	(1)
2023	US Corte	8	(0)
2023–2024	FC Bastelicaccia	8	(4)
2024–	FC Eccica Suarella	4	(0)

International career
2009–2024	Corsica	12	(1)
- * Club domestic league appearances and goals as of 21 October 2025

Yohan Bocognano (born 16 June 1990) is a French professional footballer who plays as a defender for FC Eccica Suarella in Regional 1.

== Club career ==
Bocognano was born in Ajaccio.

In January 2014, Bocognano signed for Inter Baku in the Azerbaijan Premier League. In June 2015, Bocognano moved to Romania, signing a two-year contract with FC Petrolul Ploiești.

In 2018, he signed a two-year contract with SC Bastia where he stayed up until 2022 having won promotion in French Ligue 2.

In 2022, after he was told to leave SC Bastia after his contract expired, he signed for a second time for Gazélec Ajaccio in Championnat National 3. Mid season, he left GFC Ajaccio and signed for US Corte also in Championnat National 3.

== Career statistics ==
=== Club ===
As of 11 June 2021

Appearances and goals by club, season and competition
Club	Season	League			National Cup		League Cup		Other		Total	
Club	Season	Division	App	Goals	App	Goals	App	Goals	App	Goals	App	Goals
Nîmes	2009–10	Ligue 2	10	0	1	0	0	0	—		11	0
Nîmes	2010–11	Ligue 2	12	0	1	0	3	0	—		16	0
Nîmes	Total		22	0	2	0	3	0	0	0	27	0
Gazélec Ajaccio	2011–12	Championnat National	28	3	5	1	—		—		33	4
Gazélec Ajaccio	2012–13	Ligue 2	28	4	1	0	1	0	—		30	4
Gazélec Ajaccio	Total		56	7	6	1	1	0	0	0	63	8
Istres	2013–14	Ligue 2	8	0	1	0	1	0	0	0	10	0
Inter Baku	2013–14	Azerbaijan Premier League	14	1	2	0	—		0	0	16	1
Inter Baku	2014–15	Azerbaijan Premier League	21	0	1	0	—		4	0	26	0
Inter Baku	Total		35	1	3	0	—		4	0	42	1
Tubize	2015–16	Belgian Second Division	10	1	0	0	–		–		10	1
Mulhouse	2016–17	CFA	8	0	0	0	–		–		8	0
FC Bastia-Borgo	2017–18	Championnat National 2	23	1	0	0	–		–		23	1
Bastia	2018–19	Championnat National 3	23	2	5	0	—		—		28	2
Bastia	2019–20	Championnat National 2	18	6	0	0	—		—		18	6
Bastia	2020–21	Championnat National	28	5	0	0	—		—		28	5
Bastia	2021–22	Ligue 2	27	0	4	0	—		—		31	0
Gazélec Ajaccio	2022–23	Championnat National 3	5	1	0	0	—		—		5	
US Corte	2022–23	Championnat National 3	8	0	0	0	—		—		8	
FC Bastelicaccia	2023-24	Régional 1	8	4	0	0						
	Total		69	13	5	0	0	0	0	0	74	13
Career total			231	23	17	1	5	0	4	0	257	24

=== International ===
Appearances and goals by national team and year
National team	Year	Apps	Goals
Corsica	2009	0	0
Corsica	2010	2	0
Corsica	2011	1	0
Corsica	2015	1	1
Corsica	2017	1	0
Corsica	2018	2	0
Corsica	2019	1	0
Corsica	2023	1	0
Corsica	2024	2	0
Total		12	1

Scores and results list Corsica's goal tally first, score column indicates score after each Bocognano goal.

List of international goals scored by Yohan Bocognano
No.	Date	Venue	Cap	Opponent	Score	Result	Competition
1.	29 May 2015	Stade Armand Cesari, Bastia, France	4	Burkina Faso	1–0	1–0	Friendly
