= Mathieu Scarpelli =

French footballer (born 1981)

Personal information
- Date of birth: 23 July 1981 (age 45)
- Place of birth: Grenoble, France
- Height: 1.83 m (6 ft 0 in)
- Position: Striker

Team information
- Current team: ASE Ocana

Youth career
- Grenoble

Senior career*
Years	Team	Apps	(Gls)
2001–2004	Échirolles		
2004–2005	Cassis Carnoux		
2005–2007	Ajaccio	49	(15)
2007–2009	Châteauroux	49	(14)
2009–2011	Guingamp	46	(18)
2011–2015	Fréjus Saint-Raphaël	37	(15)
2015–2020	Bastelicaccia		
2020–2021	Afa FA		
2021–2023	SC Bocognano Gravona		
2023–	ASE Ocana		
- * Club domestic league appearances and goals

Mathieu Scarpelli (born 23 July 1981) is a French footballer who plays as a striker for ASE Ocana. He is a former professional who played in Ligue 1 and Ligue 2 with Ajaccio, Châteauroux, and Guingamp.

== Career ==
Born in Grenoble, Isère, Scarpelli began playing football in Grenoble's youth academy. He would play for amateur sides FC Échirolles and SO Cassis Carnoux before turning professional with Ajaccio.

He played in Ligue 1 with Ajaccio. He spent two years with Guingamp, playing the 2009–10 UEFA Europa League and scoring 15 goals in Championnat National during his second season with the club. In July 2011, Scarpelli joined Championnat National rivals Étoile Fréjus Saint-Raphaël.
