= Romain Poletti =

French footballer (born 1988)

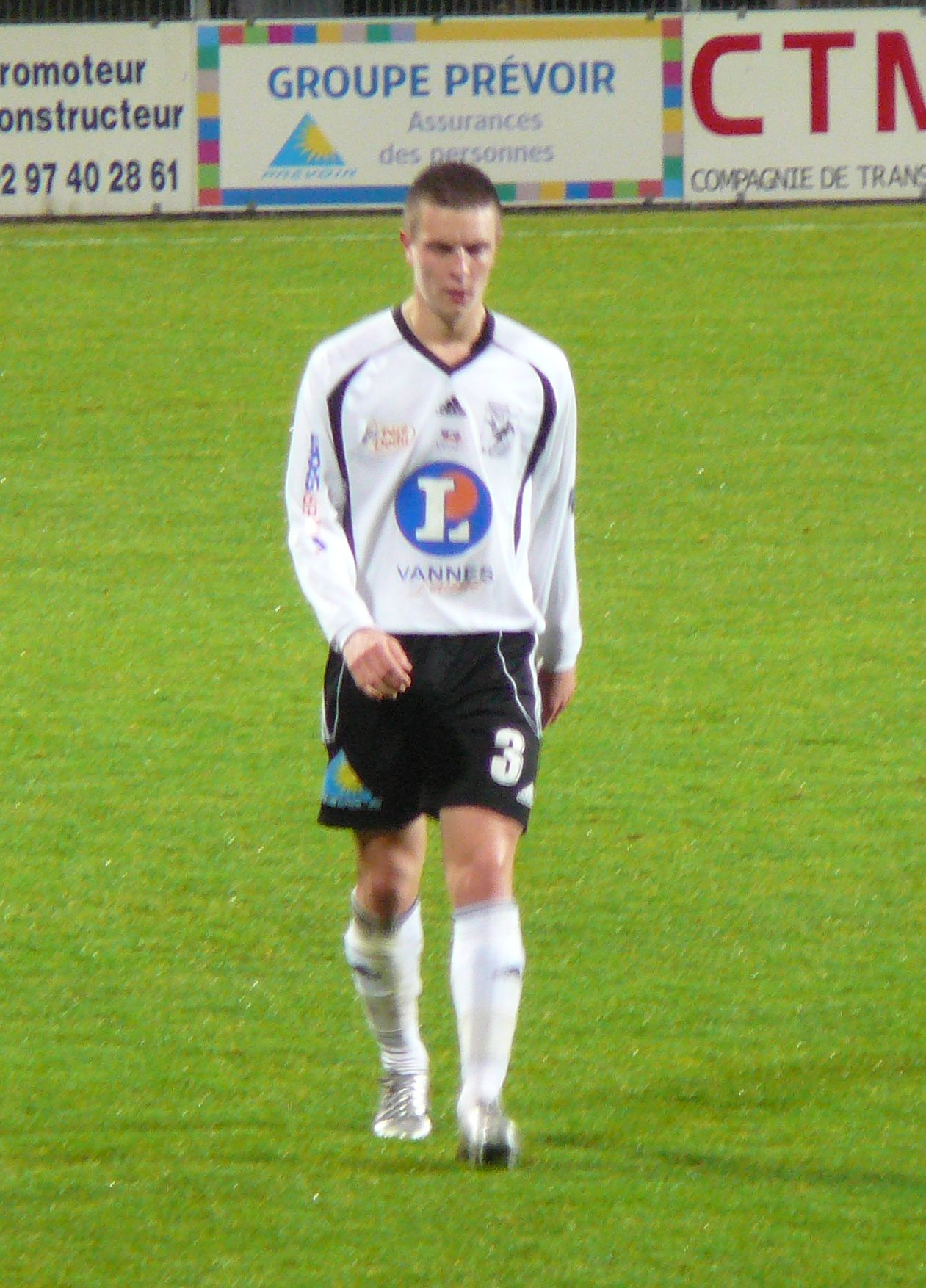

Personal information
- Date of birth: 3 September 1988 (age 38)
- Place of birth: Nantes, France
- Height: 1.81 m (5 ft 11 in)
- Position: Defender

Senior career*
Years	Team	Apps	(Gls)
2007–2008	Stade Brestois 29 B		
2009	Amiens SC B		
2009–2013	Vannes OC	26	(0)
2008–2009	SO Châtellerault	24	(2)
2009–2010	USJA Carquefou	25	(1)
2010–2012	Gazélec Ajaccio	46	(1)
2013	CA Bastia	10	(0)
2013–2014	FC Nantes B		
2014	US Boulogne	2	(0)
2015	US Colomiers Football	14	(1)
2015	Tarbes Pyrénées Football	2	(0)
2016	Orvault Sports Football		
2018–2020	FC Bastelicaccia	33	(0)

International career
- Brittany
- * Club domestic league appearances and goals

Romain Poletti (born 3 September 1988) is a French footballer who last plays as a defender for FC Bastelicaccia.

== Early life ==
Poletti started as a striker before switching to defender.

== Career ==
In 2013, Poletti signed for French side CA Bastia, helping the club achieve promotion. By the summer of that year, he had achieved four promotions in his career. In 2014, he signed for French side US Boulogne, where he was regarded as unable to establish himself as a consistent starter for the club. After that, he signed for French side US Colomiers Football, where he was described as "made a place for himself on the left side of the defense". In 2016, he signed for French side Orvault Sports Football, where he captained the club.

== Style of play ==
Poletti mainly operates as a defender and has been described as "aggressive and having a good shot".

== Personal life ==
Poletti is a native of Nantes, France.
