= Alexandre Coeff =

French footballer (born 1992)

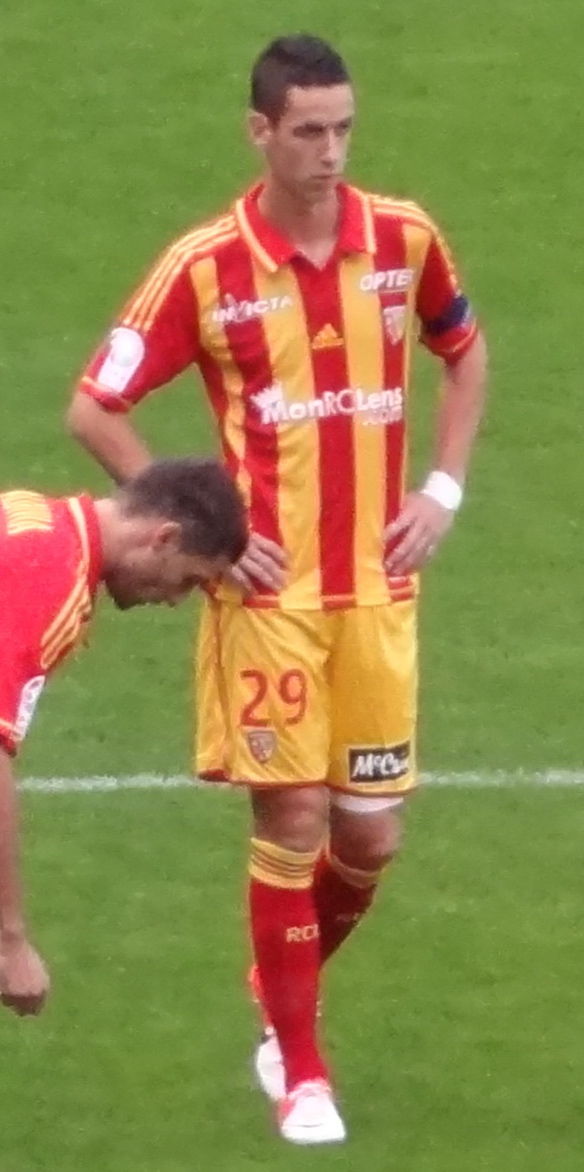
- Coeff with Lens in 2012

Personal information
- Full name: Alexandre Serge Coeff
- Date of birth: 20 February 1992 (age 34)
- Place of birth: Brest, France
- Height: 1.84 m (6 ft 0 in)
- Positions: Centre back; defensive midfielder; right back

Youth career
- 1998–2003: Cavale Blanche Brest
- 2003–2004: Guilers
- 2004–2006: Brest
- 2006–2008: Plouzane Athletic
- 2008–2011: Lens

Senior career*
Years	Team	Apps	(Gls)
2010–2012	Lens II	27	(2)
2011–2013	Lens	53	(2)
2013–2018	Udinese	0	(0)
2013–2014	→ Granada (loan)	14	(0)
2014–2015	→ Mallorca (loan)	3	(0)
2015	→ Mouscron-Péruwelz (loan)	9	(0)
2015–2016	→ Gazélec Ajaccio (loan)	28	(0)
2016–2018	→ Brest (loan)	58	(4)
2017–2018	→ Brest II (loan)	2	(0)
2018–2019	AEL	8	(1)
2019	Gazélec Ajaccio	13	(0)
2019–2023	Auxerre	93	(3)
2022	Auxerre II	1	(0)
2023	Brescia	1	(0)
2023–2024	Caen	20	(0)
2024–2025	Kerala Blasters	13	(1)
2025–2026	Valenciennes	41	(1)

International career
2007–2008	France U16	12	(1)
2008–2009	France U17	15	(2)
2010	France U18	3	(0)
2010	France U19	3	(0)
2011–2013	France U20	7	(1)
2013	France U21	1	(0)
- * Club domestic league appearances and goals as of 23 June 2026

Alexandre Serge Coeff (born 20 February 1992) is a French professional footballer who plays as a centre back or defensive midfielder.

== Club career ==
=== Youth career ===
Born in Brest, Coeff previously had stints with Plouzane Athletic, Stade Brestois 29, Guilers and Cavale Blanche Brest.

=== Lens ===
Coeff joined RC Lens' youth setup in 2008, aged 16. On 10 October 2008, he signed his first professional contract, agreeing to a three-year deal with Lens. A rupture of both the medial collateral ligament and anterior cruciate ligament in one of his knees delayed his professional career and, after successfully undergoing rehabilitation, he spent two years playing on the club's reserve team in the Championnat de France amateur, the fourth division of French football.

On 29 May 2011, Coeff made his professional debut, appearing as a substitute in a 0–4 away defeat to AS Nancy. After being sparingly used during the 2011–12 campaign, he appeared regularly in 2012–13, playing in 37 league matches and scoring once.

=== Udinese ===
On 13 July 2013, Coeff signed a five-year deal with Udinese Calcio. A day later, he was loaned to Granada CF, in a season-long deal.

=== Gazélec Ajaccio ===
On 4 August 2015, Coeff joined to Ligue 1 club Gazélec Ajaccio.

=== Brest ===
In July 2016, Coeff returned to France, and signed a two-year loan contract with Ligue 2 side Brest.

=== AEL ===
On 11 September 2018, Coeff moved to the Super League Greece, joining AEL on a two-year deal. On 3 November 2018, he scored his first goal for the club, opening the score in a 1–1 away draw against Levadiakos.

=== Return to Gazélec Ajaccio ===
On 18 January 2019, he signed a two-year contract with Gazélec Ajaccio.

=== Brescia ===
On 1 February 2023, Coeff signed with Brescia in Italian Serie B.

=== SM Caen ===
On 25 July 2023, he signed with French club Stade Malherbe Caen in Ligue 2.

=== Kerala Blasters FC ===
On 24 July 2024, the Indian Super League club Kerala Blasters FC announced the signing of Coeff on a one-year deal. He made his debut for the club on 23 August in a 1–0 loss against Bengaluru FC in the 2024 Durand Cup quarter final by coming as a substitute in the 63rd minute. Coeff made his first league appearance against Punjab FC on 15 September, which ended in a 1–2 defeat for the Blasters, where he played the entire 90 minutes. He scored his maiden goal for the Blasters against Mohammedans S.C., which ended in a 3–0 win for the Blasters. On 17 January 2025, Kerala Blasters FC and Alexandre Coeff have mutually agreed to part ways.

=== Valenciennes ===
On 26 January 2025, Coeff signed with Valenciennes.

== International career ==
Born in France, Coeff is of Algerian descent through his maternal grandmother. He is a France youth international, having earned caps from the under-16 to the under-21 levels.

== Career statistics ==
=== Club ===
As of matches played till 14 August 2024

Club	Season	League			Cup		Continental		Other		Total	
Club	Season	Division	Apps	Goals	Apps	Goals	Apps	Goals	Apps	Goals	Apps	Goals
Lens II	2010–11	Championnat National 2	14	0	—		—		—		14	0
Lens II	2011–12	Championnat National 2	13	2	—		—		—		13	2
Lens II	Lens II total		27	2	—		—		—		27	2
Lens	2010–11	Ligue 1	1	0	0	0	—		—		1	0
Lens	2011–12	Ligue 2	9	1	1 (Note: Appearance in Coupe de la Ligue)	0	—		—		10	1
Lens	2012–13	Ligue 2	37	1	6 (Note: 5 appearances in Coupe de France, 1 appearance in Coupe de la Ligue)	0	—		—		43	1
Lens	Lens total		47	2	7	0	—		—		54	2
Udinese	2013–14	Serie A	0	0	0	0	—		—		0	0
Udinese	2014–15	Serie A	0	0	0	0	—		—		0	0
Udinese	2015–16	Serie A	0	0	0	0	—		—		0	0
Udinese	2016–17	Serie A	0	0	0	0	—		—		0	0
Udinese	2017–18	Serie A	0	0	0	0	—		—		0	0
Udinese	Udinese total		0	0	0	0	—		—		0	0
Granada (loan)	2013–14	La Liga	13	0	1 (Note: Appearance in Copa del Rey)	0	—		—		14	0
Mallorca (loan)	2014–15	Segunda División	2	0	1 (Note: Appearance in Copa del Rey)	0	—		—		3	0
Mouscron-Péruwelz (loan)	2015	Belgian Pro League	9	0	0	0	—		—		9	0
Gazélec Ajaccio (loan)	2015–16	Ligue 1	24	0	4 (Note: 3 appearances in Coupe de France, 1 appearance in Coupe de la Ligue)	0	—		—		28	0
Brest (loan)	2016–17	Ligue 2	30	3	2 (Note: Appearances in Coupe de la Ligue)	0	—		—		32	3
Brest (loan)	2017–18	Ligue 2	25	1	3 (Note: 2 appearances in Coupe de France, 1 appearance in Coupe de la Ligue)	0	—		—		28	1
Brest (loan)	Brest total		55	4	5	0	—		—		60	4
Brest II (loan)	2016–17	Championnat de France Amateur 2	1	0	—		—		—		1	0
Brest II (loan)	2017–18	Championnat National 3	1	0	—		—		—		1	0
Brest II (loan)	Brest II total		2	0	—		—		—		2	0
AEL	2018–19	Super League Greece	8	1	1 (Note: Appearance in Greek Football Cup)	0	—		—		9	1
Gazélec Ajaccio	2019	Ligue 2	13	0	0	0	—		2 (Note: Appearance in Ligue 2 relegation play-offs)	0	15	0
Gazélec Ajaccio	Gazélec Ajaccio total		37	0	4	0	—		2	0	43	0
Auxerre	2019–20	Ligue 2	25	0	1 (Note: Appearance in Coupe de la Ligue)	0	—		—		26	0
Auxerre	2020–21	Ligue 2	35	2	1 (Note: Appearance in Coupe de France)	0	—		—		36	2
Auxerre	2021–22	Ligue 2	27	1	2 (Note: Appearances in Coupe de France)	0	—		1 (Note: Appearance in 2021–22 Ligue 1 relegation play-offs)	0	30	1
Auxerre	2022–23	Ligue 1	7	0	0	0	—		—		7	0
Auxerre	Auxerre total		94	3	4	0	—		1	0	99	3
Auxerre II	2022	Championnat National 2	1	0	—		—		—		1	0
Brescia	2023	Serie B	1	0	—		—		—		1	0
Caen	2023–24	Ligue 2	20	0	3 (Note: Appearances in Coupe de France)	0	—		—		23	0
Caen II	2024	Championnat National 3	1	0	—		—		—		1	0
Kerala Blasters	2024–25	Indian Super League	0	0	0 (Note: Appearance(s) in Super Cup)	0	—		0 (Note: Appearance(s) in Durand Cup)	0	0	0
Career total			317	12	26	0	—		3	0	346	12
