= FC Bastelicaccia =

Football club in Bastelicaccia, Corsica, France

- Full name: Football Club Bastelicaccia
- Short name: FCB
- Founded: 2003
- Ground: Stade Pierre Benielli
- Capacity: 1000
- Chairman: Jacques Pellegrini
- Manager: Jean-Luc Lucciani
- League: Régional 1
- 2025–26: Régional 1 Corsica, 3rd of 12
- Website: https://fc-bastelicaccia.corsica/

Football Club Bastelicaccia is a French football club based in Bastelicaccia, Corsica. They currently play in the Régional 1, the sixth level of French football.

Founded in 2003, they used to play in the fifth tier of French football, the Championnat National 3, after finishing top of the 2017–18 Division d'Honneur of the Corsican football league.

== History ==
In 2007, the club won the regional Division d'Honneur for the first time and were promoted to what was then called the Championnat de France Amateur 2, later renamed the Championnat National 3. However, the club was relegated the following season after finishing 14th. Later notable players included Mathieu Scarpelli, and by 2018, the club was managed by Jean-Luc Lucciani, with former footballer Jean-Roch Testa as assistant.

== Current squad ==
As of 25 February 2019

Note: Flags indicate national team as defined under FIFA eligibility rules; some limited exceptions apply. Players may hold more than one non-FIFA nationality.

| No. | Pos. | Nation | Player |
|---|---|---|---|
| — | GK | FRA | Clément Maury |
| — | GK | FRA | David Graziani |
| — | DF | FRA | Adel Ayadi |
| — | DF | FRA | Yohan Bocognano |
| — | DF | FRA | Rodéric Filippi |
| — | DF | FRA | Valentin Orlandazzi |
| — | DF | FRA | Romain Poletti |
| — | DF | FRA | Pierrick Prevert |
| — | DF | FRA | Maxime Susini |
| — | DF | FRA | Kevin Warton |
| — | DF | FRA | Mohamed El Ouahabi |
| — | DF | FRA | Lisandru ottavy |
| — | DF | FRA | Jean-Philippe Poggi |
| — | MF | FRA | Anthony Arnaudo |
| — | MF | FRA | Jean-Charles Baquet |

| No. | Pos. | Nation | Player |
|---|---|---|---|
| — | MF | FRA | Jean-Baptiste Baraglioli |
| — | MF | FRA | Fabrice Lubrano |
| — | MF | FRA | Aurelien Mirman |
| — | MF | FRA | Pascal Pastor |
| — | MF | FRA | Nicolas Porri |
| — | MF | FRA | Mathieu Scarpelli |
| — | MF | FRA | Jean-Michel Tomasini |
| — | MF | FRA | Florian Fieschi |
| — | FW | FRA | Lucien Alessandri |
| — | FW | FRA | Lucas Libbra |
| — | FW | FRA | Pierre-François Moracchini |
| — | FW | POR | Cesar Vieira |
| — | FW | FRA | Jean-Michel Tomasini |
| — | FW | FRA | Jean-François Subrini |
