= Alassane Touré =

French footballer (born 1989)

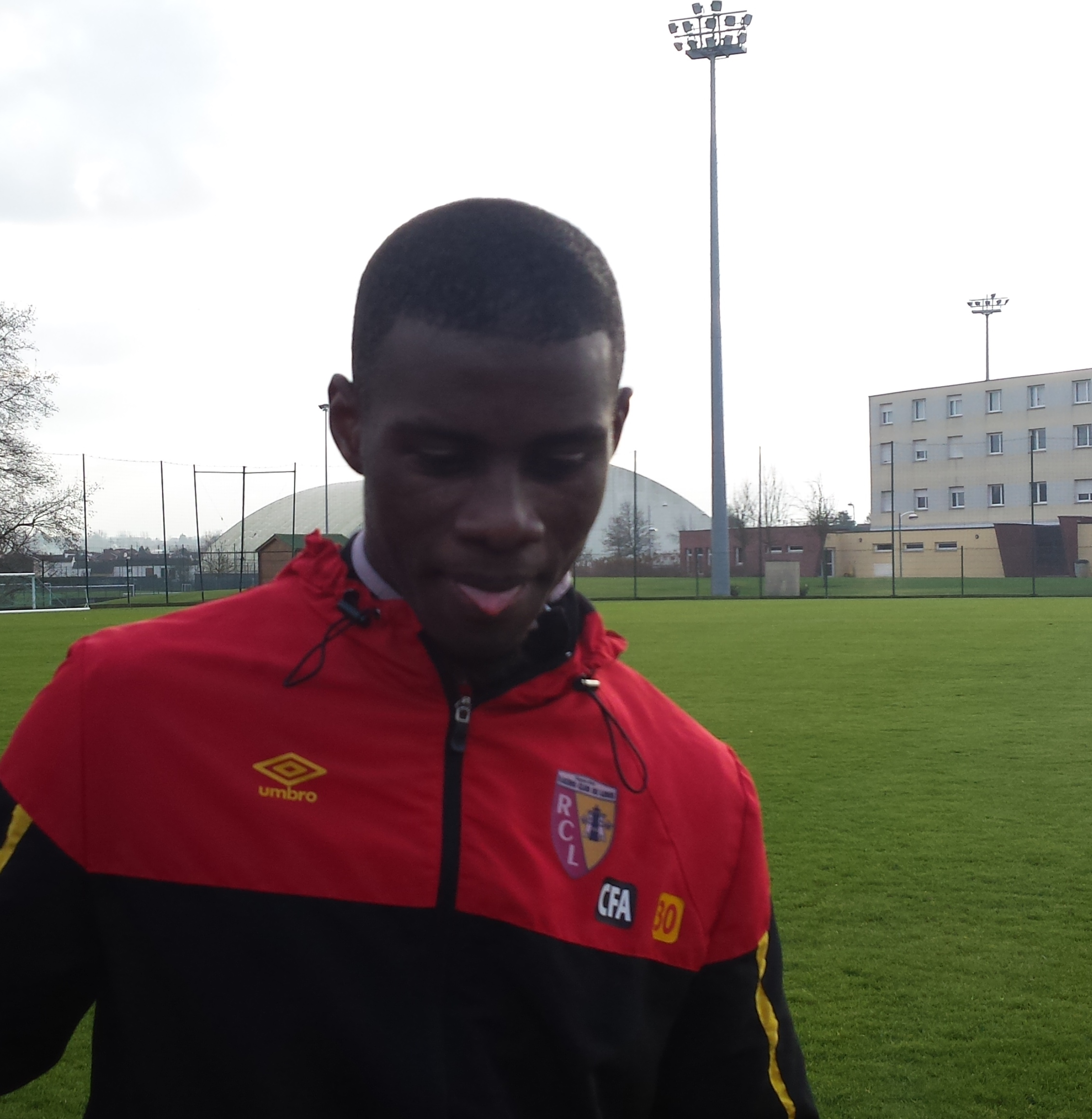

Personal information
- Date of birth: 9 February 1989 (age 37)
- Place of birth: Sarcelles, France
- Height: 1.83 m (6 ft 0 in)
- Positions: Right back; centre back

Team information
- Current team: Saint-Brice FC

Youth career
- 2005–2009: Toulouse

Senior career*
Years	Team	Apps	(Gls)
2009–2014	Lens	51	(0)
2014	Astra Giurgiu	2	(0)
2015	Tours	16	(0)
2015–2016	Gazélec Ajaccio	13	(1)
2016–2019	Tubize	62	(2)
2020–	Saint-Brice FC		
- * Club domestic league appearances and goals as of 05:30, 21 September 2019 (UTC)

Alassane Touré (born 9 February 1989) is a French footballer who plays for Saint-Brice FC.
