= Ali M'Madi =

Association football player (born 1990)

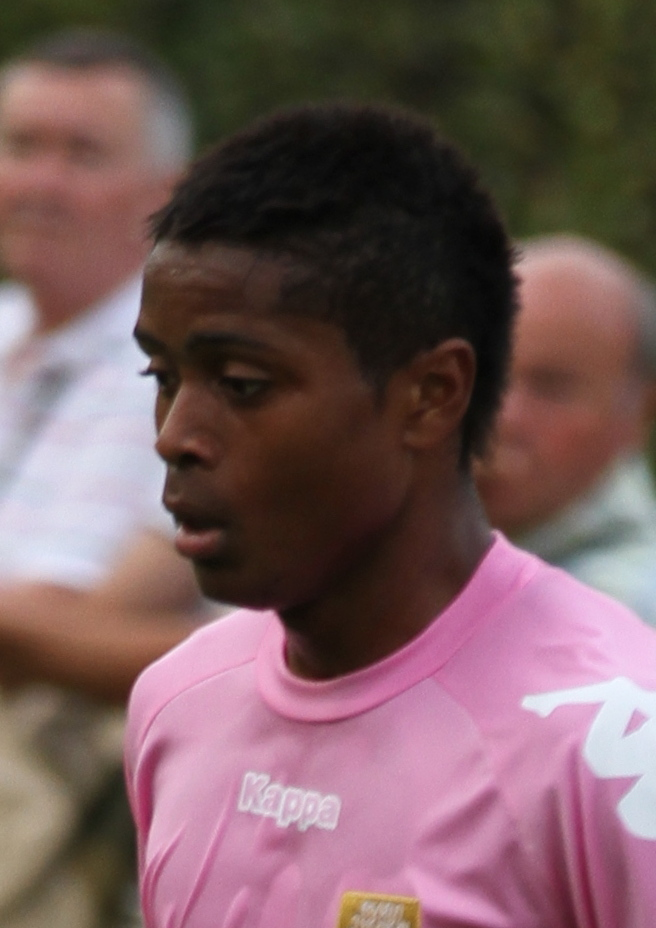

Personal information
- Date of birth: 21 April 1990 (age 36)
- Place of birth: Marseille, France
- Height: 1.78 m (5 ft 10 in)
- Positions: Winger; forward

Team information
- Current team: Colmar
- Number: 26

Youth career
- 1999–2005: Vitrolles
- 2005–2007: Cannes
- 2007–2008: Lens

Senior career*
Years	Team	Apps	(Gls)
2009–2014	Evian	23	(2)
2013–2014	→ Gazélec Ajaccio (loan)	28	(3)
2013	Evian B	6	(0)
2014–2015	Gazélec Ajaccio	23	(2)
2015–2016	Grenoble	27	(6)
2016–2017	CR Al Hoceima	6	(0)
2017–2019	Villefranche	50	(10)
2019–2020	Andrézieux	19	(3)
2020–2021	Tours	3	(1)
2021–2024	Épinal	76	(11)
2024–	Colmar	7	(2)

International career
2010–2023	Comoros	34	(0)
- * Club domestic league appearances and goals as of 7 December 2024

Ali M'Madi (born 21 April 1990) is a professional footballer who plays for Championnat National 1 club Colmar. He plays as either a forward or a winger. Born in France, he represents Comoros internationally.

== Club career ==
M'Madi was born in Marseille. He had stints in the youth academies of both Cannes and Lens before joining Evian in 2009.

== International career ==
Although born in France, he plays for the Comoros at senior international level and made his international debut on 9 October 2010 in a 2012 Africa Cup of Nations qualification against Mozambique.
