= Jérôme Le Moigne =

French footballer (born 1983)

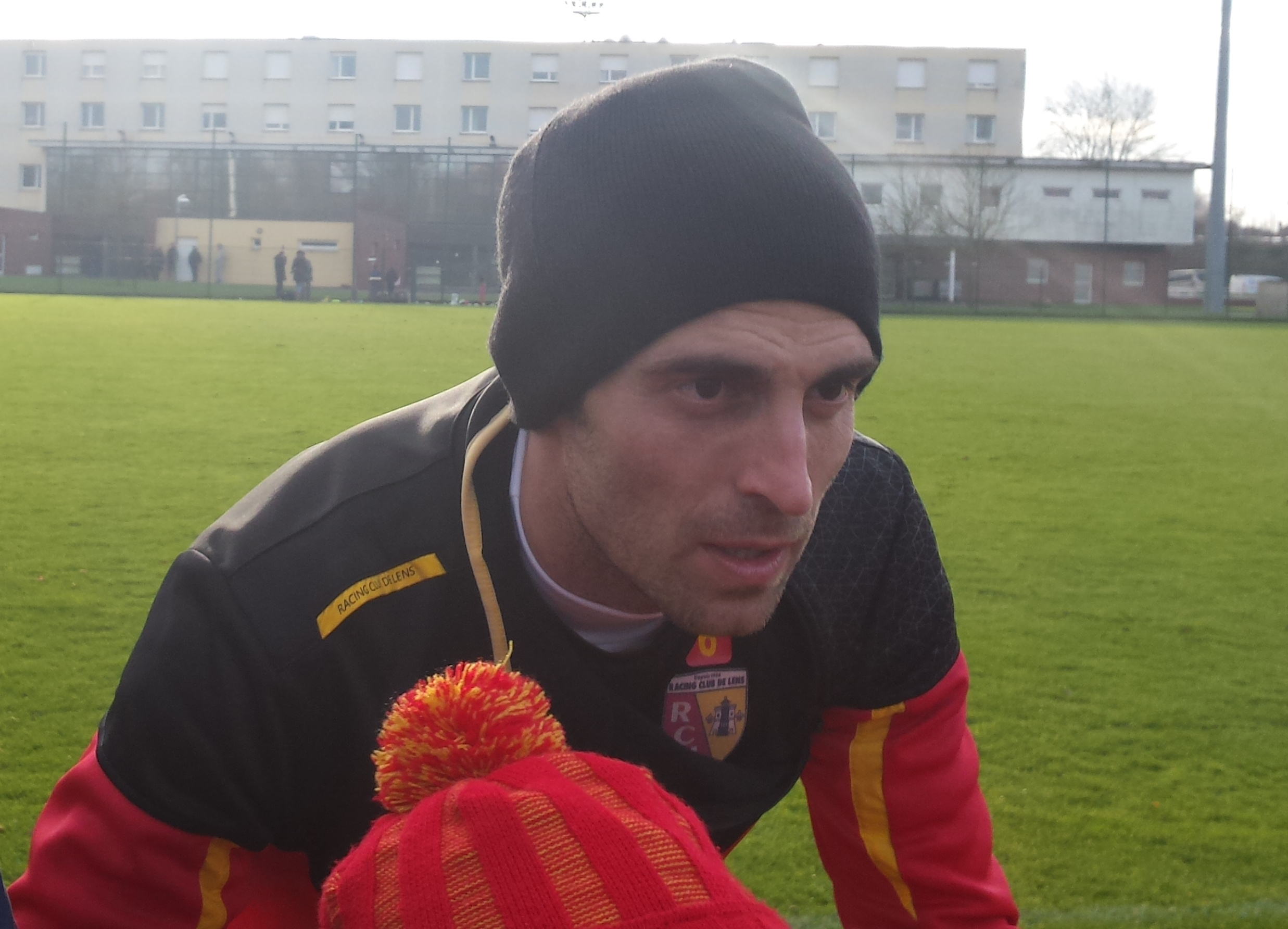
- Le Moigne in 2014

Personal information
- Date of birth: 15 February 1983 (age 43)
- Place of birth: Toulon, France
- Height: 1.88 m (6 ft 2 in)
- Position: Midfielder

Youth career
- 1999–2002: Cannes

Senior career*
Years	Team	Apps	(Gls)
2002–2003	Cannes	2	(0)
2003–2006	Toulon	88	(10)
2006–2012	Sedan	166	(13)
2012–2015	Lens	92	(2)
2015–2017	Gazélec Ajaccio	54	(2)
2017–2018	Bastia-Borgo	26	(3)
Total		428	(32)
- * Club domestic league appearances and goals

Jérôme Le Moigne (born 15 February 1983) is a French former professional footballer who played as a midfielder.

== Career ==
In July 2017, Le Moigne joined French fourth-tier side Bastia-Borgo.
