= Paul-André Guérin =

French footballer (born 1997)

Personal information
- Date of birth: 26 September 1997 (age 29)
- Place of birth: Bastia, France
- Height: 1.83 m (6 ft 0 in)
- Position: Goalkeeper

Team information
- Current team: Balagne
- Number: 1

Youth career
- –2015: AC Ajaccio

College career
Years	Team	Apps	(Gls)
2016–2019	CSUF Titans	67	(0)

Senior career*
Years	Team	Apps	(Gls)
2015–2016	Gazélec Ajaccio	2	(0)
2020–2022	Bastia-Borgo	1	(0)
2022–	Balagne	75	(1)
- * Club domestic league appearances and goals as of 14 November 2024

Paul-André Guérin (French pronunciation: [pɔl ɑ̃dʁe ɡeʁɛ̃]; 26 September 1997) is a French professional footballer who plays as a goalkeeper for Championnat National 1 club Balagne.

== Club career ==
Guerin played two years at the French Federation Academy of Corsica before moving to Ajaccio. He made his Ligue 1 debut on 2 December 2015 against Montpellier in a 2–0 away win replacing Jules Goda after 41 minutes.

In 2016, Guerin decided to travel to Fullerton, California to study at California State University, Fullerton while playing college football for The Titans. Guerin played 67 games for the senior first team,

In January 2020, Guerin returned to France and signed with Bastia-Borgo in Championnat National.
