= Damjan Đoković =

Croatian footballer (born 1990)

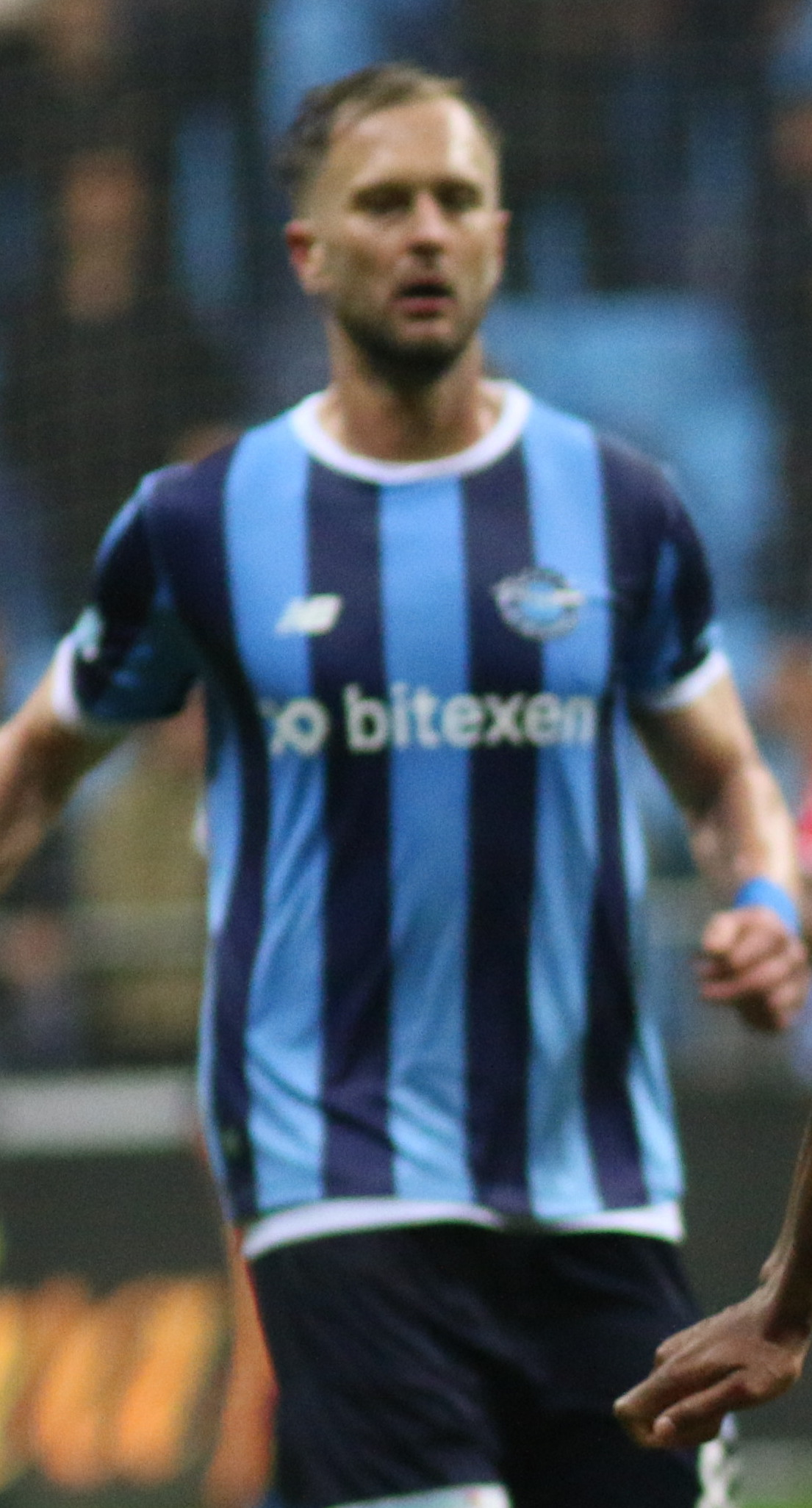
- Đoković with Adana Demirspor in 2022

Personal information
- Full name: Damjan Đoković
- Date of birth: 18 April 1990 (age 36)
- Place of birth: Zagreb, SR Croatia, SFR Yugoslavia
- Height: 1.90 m (6 ft 3 in)
- Position: Midfielder

Youth career
- –1998: Haaglandia
- 1998–2006: ADO Den Haag
- 2006–2007: Excelsior Rotterdam
- 2007–2009: Sparta Rotterdam

Senior career*
Years	Team	Apps	(Gls)
2009–2010	Spartak Trnava	1	(0)
2011	Monza	10	(4)
2011–2013	Cesena	45	(4)
2013–2015	Bologna	0	(0)
2013–2014	→ CFR Cluj (loan)	27	(3)
2014–2015	→ Livorno (loan)	33	(1)
2015–2016	Gazélec Ajaccio	35	(2)
2016–2017	Greuther Fürth	7	(0)
2017	Spezia	19	(3)
2017	Rijeka	2	(0)
2017–2021	CFR Cluj	90	(8)
2021–2022	Çaykur Rizespor	41	(6)
2022	→ Adana Demirspor (loan)	8	(0)
2022–2023	Al-Raed	29	(2)
2023–2024	FCSB	17	(2)
2024	Rapid București	10	(1)
2024–2026	CFR Cluj	69	(5)
- * Club domestic league appearances and goals as of 16 August 2026

Damjan Đoković (Serbian Cyrillic: Дамјан Ђоковић, romanized: Damjan Djoković; born 18 April 1990) is a Croatian professional footballer who plays as midfielder for Liga I club CFR Cluj.

Born in Croatia, Đoković represented several sides in the Netherlands at junior level, before making his senior debut for Slovak team Spartak Trnava in 2010. He went on to compete professionally in Croatia, Italy, Romania, France, Germany, Turkey, and Saudi Arabia.

Đoković achieved most success playing for CFR Cluj in Romania, amassing over 110 league games combined during his first two spells and winning five domestic honours.

== Club career ==
=== Early career ===
Đoković spent his junior years at Dutch clubs Haaglandia, ADO Den Haag, Excelsior Rotterdam, and Sparta Rotterdam, respectively. He made his senior debut for Slovak team Spartak Trnava in 2009, recording only one appearance. The following year, he returned to his country of birth by signing for Croatian side HNK Gorica, but did not play any match.

=== Italy ===
Đoković joined Italian club Monza in January 2011. He amassed four goals from 10 Lega Pro Prima Divisione games, throughout a season which ended in relegation for the Biancorossi.

On 31 August 2011, Đoković was signed by Cesena for €220,000 and the loan of two other players. He made his Serie A debut on 23 October 2011, replacing Erjon Bogdani in the 88th minute of a 0–2 away loss to Siena. He ended the campaign with 15 appearances, and stayed at the club for one more year after its relegation to the Serie B.

On 25 June 2013, Đoković moved to Bologna in a swap deal which took Andrea Ingegneri in the opposite direction, with both players being held in a co-ownership deals. He signed a three-year contract, but was immediately sent on loan to Romanian team CFR Cluj. In June 2014, the co-ownership deals were renewed, and on 27 August he again left on loan to Serie B side Livorno.

Đoković was released by Bologna on 22 July 2015, without registering his debut in any competition.

=== Gazélec Ajaccio ===
On 22 July 2015, Đoković signed for French club Gazélec Ajaccio, newly promoted to the Ligue 1. He played 35 league matches and scored two goals, but left as a free agent following their relegation to the Ligue 2.

=== Greuther Fürth ===
Đoković changed countries again on 15 October 2016, after agreeing a deal until the end of the season with 2. Bundesliga team Greuther Fürth.

=== Spezia ===
On 28 January 2017, less than four months after joining Greuther Fürth and having made seven league appearances, Đoković returned to Italy by signing for Serie B side Spezia.

=== Rijeka ===
On 19 June 2017, Đoković agreed to a three-year contract with Croatian defending champions HNK Rijeka. He only featured in three games during his two-and-a-half-month spell, including an appearance in a 5–1 away victory over Welsh club The New Saints in the second qualifying round of the UEFA Champions League on 18 July.

=== Return to CFR Cluj ===
Đoković returned to CFR Cluj on 4 September 2017. On 20 May 2018, he won his first career trophy after scoring the only goal of the final Liga I fixture against Viitorul Constanța.

On 1 August 2018, Đoković recorded his first European goal after opening the scoring in a Champions League second qualifying round match against Malmö FF (1–1 away draw, 1–2 loss on aggregate). On 12 December 2019, he scored in a 2–0 home defeat of Celtic in the Europa League, with CFR Cluj advancing to knockout phase from second place in Group E.

Đoković amassed 124 games and ten goals in all competitions during his second stint in Cluj-Napoca, winning the national title in every possible season as well as the 2018 Supercupa României.

=== Turkey ===
On 25 January 2021, Đoković was transferred by Turkish club Çaykur Rizespor for a rumoured fee of €400,000. He made 19 Süper Lig appearances and netted twice during the remainder of the season, including a goal in a 2–3 home loss to Beşiktaş on 28 April.

On 27 August 2021, Đoković scored a double in a 2–3 away league loss to Antalyaspor. In February 2022, he moved to fellow Süper Lig team Adana Demirspor on a short-term loan.

=== Late career ===
On 25 July 2022, Đoković joined Saudi Pro League club Al-Raed on a free transfer. He totalled two goals from 29 league appearances during his stint.

Đoković returned to Romania by signing a contract with FCSB on 27 June 2023. He scored his first goals for the Roș-albaștrii on 3 August, his double helping defeat CSKA 1948 3–2 at home and 4–2 on aggregate in the second qualifying round of the Europa Conference League.

On 7 January 2023, after falling out with FCSB owner Gigi Becali, Đoković moved to city rivals Rapid București on a one-and-a-half-year deal. On 10 February, he scored the only goal of an away victory over his former team CFR Cluj.

Đoković also failed to impress at Rapid București, and on 21 August 2024 returned to CFR Cluj for a third spell. Five days later, he scored a long-range goal in a 3–0 Liga I defeat of Botoșani.

== Personal life ==
Đoković was born in Zagreb, SR Croatia, SFR Yugoslavia, to a Serbian father and a Croatian mother. He moved to the Netherlands at age three.

== Career statistics ==
As of match played 16 August 2026

Appearances and goals by club, season and competition
Club	Season	League			National cup (Note: Includes Coppa Italia, Cupa României, Coupe de France, Turkish Cup, King's Cup)		League cup (Note: Includes Coupe de la Ligue)		Europe		Other		Total	
Club	Season	Division	Apps	Goals	Apps	Goals	Apps	Goals	Apps	Goals	Apps	Goals	Apps	Goals
Spartak Trnava	2009–10	Slovak First League	1	0	0	0	—		—		—		1	0
Monza	2010–11	Lega Pro Prima Divisione	10	4	—		—		—		2 (Note: Appearances in Lega Pro Prima Divisione relegation play-offs)	0	12	4
Cesena	2011–12	Serie A	15	0	0	0	—		—		—		15	0
Cesena	2012–13	Serie B	30	4	1	0	—		—		—		31	4
Cesena	Total		45	4	1	0	—		—		—		46	4
CFR Cluj (loan)	2013–14	Liga I	27	3	1	0	—		—		—		28	3
Livorno (loan)	2014–15	Serie B	33	1	1	0	—		—		—		34	1
Gazélec Ajaccio	2015–16	Ligue 1	35	2	3	0	1	0	—		—		39	2
Greuther Fürth	2016–17	2. Bundesliga	7	0	0	0	—		—		—		7	0
Spezia	2016–17	Serie B	19	3	—		—		—		1 (Note: Appearance in Serie B promotion play-offs)	0	20	3
Rijeka	2017–18	Prva HNL	2	0	—		—		1 (Note: Appearance in UEFA Champions League)	0	—		3	0
CFR Cluj	2017–18	Liga I	23	3	0	0	—		—		—		23	3
CFR Cluj	2018–19	Liga I	33	4	3	0	—		4 (Note: Two appearances and one goal in UEFA Champions League, two appearances in UEFA Europa League)	1	1 (Note: Appearance in Supercupa României)	0	41	5
CFR Cluj	2019–20	Liga I	18	1	1	0	—		15 (Note: Seven appearances in UEFA Champions League, eight appearances and one goal in UEFA Europa League)	1	1	0	35	2
CFR Cluj	2020–21	Liga I	16	0	0	0	—		9 (Note: One appearance in UEFA Champions League, eight appearances in UEFA Europa League)	0	—		25	0
CFR Cluj	Total		90	8	4	0	—		28	2	2	0	124	10
Çaykur Rizespor	2020–21	Süper Lig	19	2	—		—		—		—		19	2
Çaykur Rizespor	2021–22	Süper Lig	22	4	0	0	—		—		—		22	4
Çaykur Rizespor	Total		41	6	0	0	—		—		—		41	6
Adana Demirspor (loan)	2021–22	Süper Lig	8	0	1	0	—		—		—		9	0
Al Raed	2022–23	Saudi Pro League	29	2	1	0	—		—		—		30	2
FCSB	2023–24	Liga I	17	2	3	0	—		3 (Note: Appearances in UEFA Conference League)	2	—		23	4
Rapid București	2023–24	Liga I	10	1	—		—		—		—		10	1
CFR Cluj	2024–25	Liga I	33	2	6	0	—		2	0	—		41	2
CFR Cluj	2025–26	Liga I	33	3	2	0	—		8 (Note: Six appearances in UEFA Europa League, two appearances in UEFA Conference League)	0	1	0	44	3
CFR Cluj	2026–27	Liga I	3	0	—		—		3	0	—		6	0
CFR Cluj	Total		69	5	8	0	—		13	0	1	0	90	5
Career total			443	41	23	0	1	0	44	4	6	0	517	45

== Honours ==
Spartak Trnava

- Slovak Cup runner-up: 2009–10

CFR Cluj

- Liga I: 2017–18, 2018–19, 2019–20, 2020–21
- Cupa României: 2024–25
- Supercupa României: 2018; runner-up: 2019, 2025

FCSB

- Liga I: 2023–24

Individual

- Liga I Team of the Championship Play-Offs: 2018–19
