= Clément Maury =

French footballer (born 1985)

Personal information
- Date of birth: 20 November 1985 (age 40)
- Place of birth: Aurillac, France
- Height: 1.81 m (5 ft 11 in)
- Position: Goalkeeper

Team information
- Current team: Bastelicaccia

Senior career*
Years	Team	Apps	(Gls)
2002–2005	Châteauroux	0	(0)
2005–2007	Brive	61	(0)
2007–2010	Toulouse Fontaines	92	(0)
2010–2017	Gazélec Ajaccio	177	(0)
2018	GS Consolat	8	(0)
2019–2020	Gazélec Ajaccio	1	(0)
2020–2022	Balagne		
2022–	Bastelicaccia		
- * Club domestic league appearances and goals as of 2 October 2024

Clément Maury (born 20 November 1985) is a French professional footballer who plays as a goalkeeper for Bastelicaccia.

== Career ==
Maury started his career with Châteauroux but did not make a first-team appearance for the club, although he played regularly for the reserve team. He joined Championnat de France amateur (CFA) side Brive in 2005 and went on to play 61 league matches during two seasons with the club. Maury signed for Toulouse Fontaines ahead of the 2007–08 season and was a regular feature of the team that won promotion to the CFA in 2009. In total, he made 92 appearances for Fontaines before transferring to Gazélec Ajaccio in the summer of 2010.

Maury became the first-choice goalkeeper at Gazélec as the side won successive promotions, firstly to the Championnat National in 2011 and then to Ligue 2 for the first time in the club's history in 2012. After being released from Gazélec Ajaccio in the summer of 2017, he joined GS Consolat in the Championnat National on 4 January 2018.

In August 2018, he was signed by newly founded Italian amateur club "A.C. Vicenza 1902", an illegitimate phoenix club of Vicenza Calcio. A.C. Vicenza failed to apply a place in 2018–19 Serie D thus folded.

In the summer of 2019, he returned for a second time to Gazélec Ajaccio in the Championnat National as a back-up goalkeeper. Following the club's relegation due to COVID-19, he left.

He signed for FC Balagne in Corsica for two years, in Régional 1. Later in the summer of 2022 having left FC Balagne, he remained in Corsica where he signed for FC Bastelicaccia also playing in Régional 1.
