= Rodéric Filippi =

French footballer (born 1989)

Personal information
- Date of birth: 25 February 1989 (age 37)
- Place of birth: La Seyne-sur-Mer, France
- Height: 1.83 m (6 ft 0 in)
- Position: Centre-back

Team information
- Current team: FC Bastelicaccia
- Number: 4

Youth career
- 2007–2009: AC Ajaccio

Senior career*
Years	Team	Apps	(Gls)
2009–2016	Gazélec Ajaccio	185	(16)
2016–2019	Tours	49	(3)
2018	Tours II	1	(2)
2019–2023	Gazélec Ajaccio	40	(0)
2023–	FC Bastelicaccia	2	(0)
- * Club domestic league appearances and goals as of 06:16, 30 March 2022 (UTC)

Rodéric Filippi (born 25 February 1989) is a French former professional footballer who plays as a centre-back for FC Bastelicaccia in Régional 1.

== Career ==
Filippi joined Ajaccio in 2007. However, he never made a senior appearance for the club.

In 2009, Filippi joined Gazélec Ajaccio on a free transfer. In seven years with the club, he made 165 league appearances, scoring 16 goals. In 2016, Gazélec released Filippi, and he became a free agent.

In September 2016, Tours signed Filippi. In 2019 after three seasons with Tours FC, he joigned once again Gazélec Ajaccio who suffered relegation.

After 3 seasons and a half at the club, he decided to retire in January 2023, with Gazélec Ajaccio facing serious financial problems, and who was forced to end its participation in Championnat National 3.
