= John Tshibumbu =

Congolese footballer (born 1989)

Personal information
- Full name: John Lungeny Tshibumbu
- Date of birth: 6 January 1989 (age 37)
- Place of birth: Kinshasa, Zaire
- Height: 1.76 m (5 ft 9 in)
- Position: Striker

Youth career
- 2002–2007: Pari Mutuel Urbain Camerounais

Senior career*
Years	Team	Apps	(Gls)
2008–2010	Cannes	50	(11)
2010–2012	Charleroi	4	(0)
2011	→ Tubize (loan)	11	(3)
2011–2012	→ Tubize (loan)	29	(8)
2013–2017	Gazélec Ajaccio	102	(20)
2017–2018	Tours	30	(3)
2018	Tours II	1	(0)
Total		227	(45)

International career
2015	DR Congo	1	(0)
- * Club domestic league appearances and goals

John Lungeny Tshibumbu (born 6 January 1989) is a Congolese former professional footballer who played as a striker. He made one appearance for the DR Congo national team.

== Career ==
Tshibumbu began his career in Cameroon for Pari Mutuel Urbain Camerounais Buea and signed in January 2008 for AS Cannes. On 16 June 2010, Royal Charleroi signed the forward from Cannes.

On 16 May 2015, he scored twice in a 3–2 win for Gazélec Ajaccio against Niort, earning the Corsican club's first promotion to Ligue 1.

== Personal life ==
The Kinshasa-born Tshibumbu is of Congolese and Gabonese descent.
