= Stade Ange Casanova =

Football stadium in Ajaccio, France

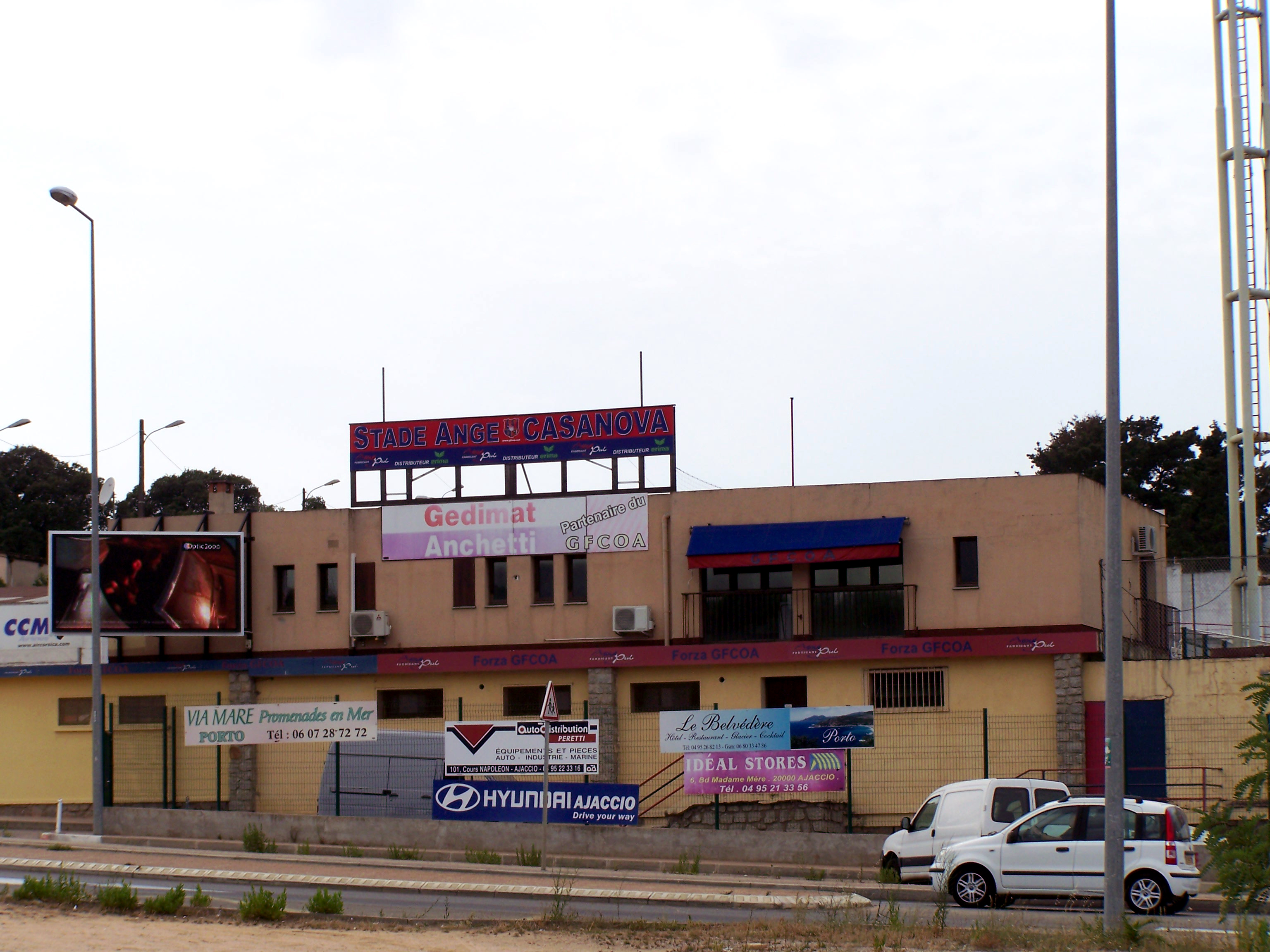
- Exterior of the stadium
- Interactive map of Stade Ange Casanova
- Former names: Stade Mezzavia
- Location: Ajaccio, Corsica, France
- Coordinates: 41°57′5″N 8°46′20″E
- Capacity: 8,000
- Surface: grass

Construction
- Opened: 1961

Tenant
- Gazélec Ajaccio (1961–present)

The Stade Ange Casanova (Corsican: Stadiu Anghjulu Casanova) is a stadium in Ajaccio on the French island of Corsica. It is the home ground of football club Gazélec Ajaccio. It has a capacity of 8,000 people.

Formerly named the Stade Mezzavia, the stadium was built in 1961. It was renamed Stade Ange Casanova on 16 July 1994 in memory of Ange Casanova, ex-director of Gazélec. Before 1961, the club played at the Stade Miniconi.
