= Grégory Pujol =

French footballer (born 1980)

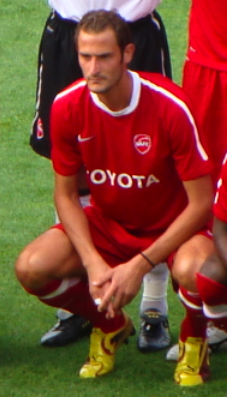
- Pujol in 2010

Personal information
- Full name: Grégory Daniel Bernard Pujol
- Date of birth: 25 January 1980 (age 46)
- Place of birth: Paris, France
- Height: 1.83 m (6 ft 0 in)
- Position: Striker

Team information
- Current team: Saint-Amand FC

Senior career*
Years	Team	Apps	(Gls)
2001–2006	Nantes	71	(11)
2005–2006	→ Anderlecht (loan)	11	(4)
2006–2007	Sedan	36	(10)
2007–2014	Valenciennes	189	(50)
2014–2016	Gazélec Ajaccio	47	(9)
2019–	Saint-Amand FC	0	(0)
Total		354	(84)
- * Club domestic league appearances and goals

Grégory Daniel Bernard Pujol (born 25 January 1980) is a French professional footballer who plays as a striker for French amateur club Saint-Amand FC.

== Career ==
Pujol's previous clubs are FC Nantes, R.S.C. Anderlecht and CS Sedan. With the Belgian side, after spending the entire season on the bench, he profited from starter Nicolás Frutos's injury to leave his mark (11 games, 4 goals) on a team that won that season's Jupiler League title.

After suffering relegation to Ligue 2 with Valenciennes in the 2013–14 season, Pujol left the club and signed a two-year contract with the promoted team Gazélec Ajaccio.

Pujol came out of retirement after three years in June 2019, and joined French amateur club Saint-Amand Football Club.
