= Maxwel Cornet =

Ivorian footballer (born 1996)

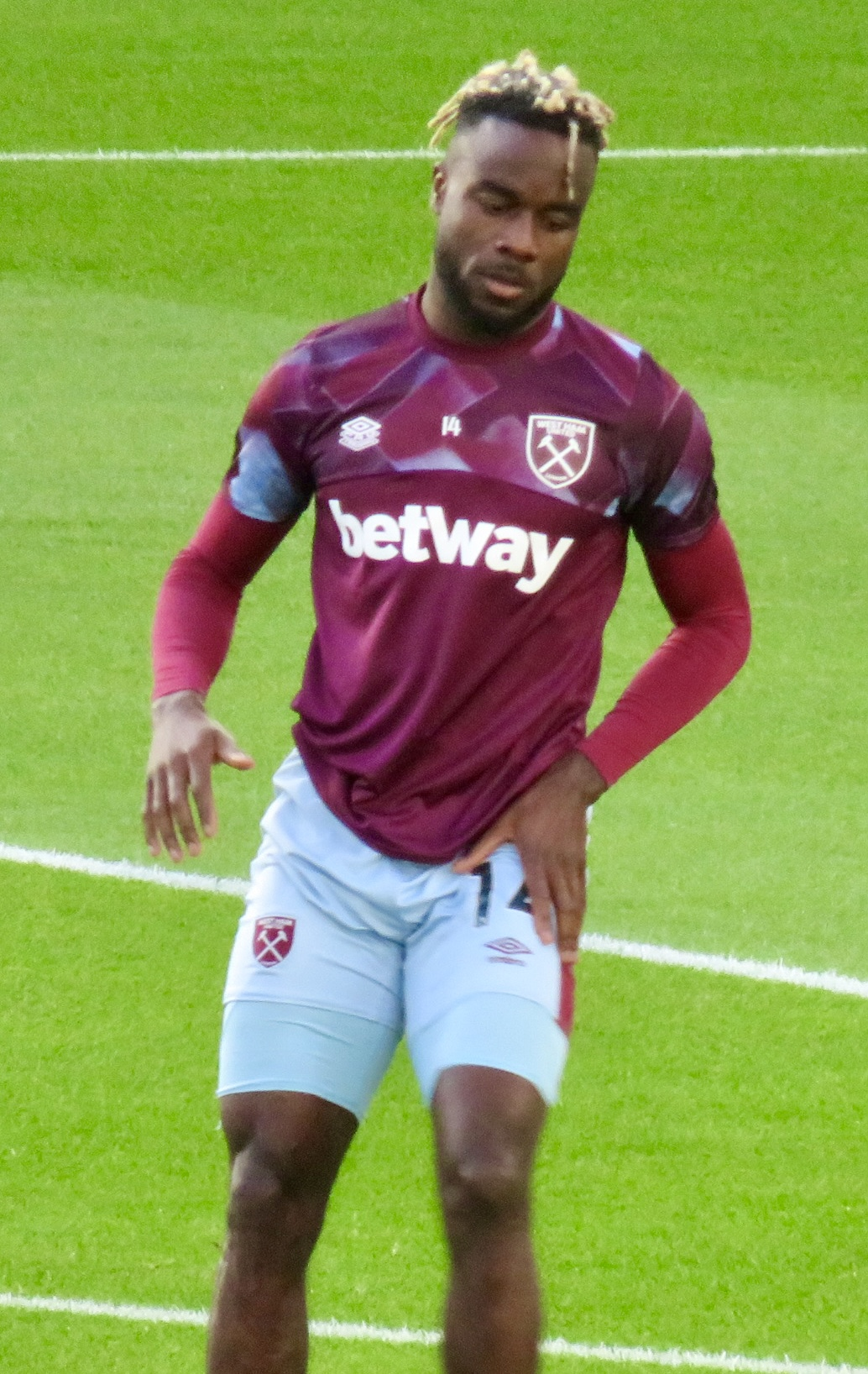
- Cornet warming up for West Ham United in 2022

Personal information
- Full name: Gnaly Albert Maxwel Cornet
- Date of birth: 27 September 1996 (age 30)
- Place of birth: Bregbo, Ivory Coast
- Height: 1.79 m (5 ft 10 in)
- Positions: Winger; full-back

Team information
- Current team: West Ham United
- Number: 22

Youth career
- 2002–2004: ARS Laquenexy
- 2004–2012: Metz

Senior career*
Years	Team	Apps	(Gls)
2012–2014	Metz II	21	(6)
2012–2015	Metz	23	(1)
2015	Lyon II	3	(3)
2015–2021	Lyon	184	(31)
2021–2022	Burnley	26	(9)
2022–	West Ham United	21	(1)
2024–2025	→ Southampton (loan)	2	(0)
2025	→ Genoa (loan)	7	(2)
2025–2026	→ Genoa (loan)	8	(0)

International career^{‡}
2011–2012	France U16	15	(5)
2012–2013	France U17	9	(7)
2013–2014	France U18	4	(2)
2013–2015	France U19	17	(8)
2015	France U20	2	(1)
2015–2016	France U21	5	(1)
2017–	Ivory Coast	31	(6)
- * Club domestic league appearances and goals as of 25 May 2026 ‡ National team caps and goals as of 23:02, 9 September 2023 (UTC)

Gnaly Albert Maxwel Cornet (born 27 September 1996) is an Ivorian professional footballer who plays as a left winger and full-back for EFL Championship club West Ham United and the Ivory Coast national team. He has previously played in France for Metz and Lyon and in England with Burnley.

== Club career ==
=== Metz ===
Cornet is a youth exponent from Metz. Aged 15 years and 11 months, he made his debut for Metz in the third-tier of French football, the Championnat National in a game on 31 August 2012. Cornet was an 85th-minute substitute for Alhassane Keita in Metz' 6–3 win against Quevilly. He made his Ligue 2 debut on 2 August 2013 against Laval. He replaced Yeni Ngbakoto after 79 minutes in a 1–0 home victory.

=== Lyon ===
On 16 January 2015, Cornet signed for Ligue 1 club Lyon. He made his league debut for the club against his former club Metz on 25 January 2015, replacing Alexandre Lacazette after 34 minutes due to an injury, in an eventual 2–0 home win. Cornet scored his first goal for Lyon on 23 October 2015 as an 89th-minute substitute in a 3–0 home win over Toulouse.

In January 2020, Cornet was tested at the left-back position by Lyon's coach Rudi Garcia following the injuries of Youssouf Koné and Fernando Marçal. After his good performances, he became the club's starting left-back for the rest of the season. On 15 August 2020, Cornet scored a goal against Manchester City in the 2019–20 UEFA Champions League quarter-finals which Lyon won 3–1 and progressed to the semi-finals.

=== Burnley ===
On 29 August 2021, Cornet signed for Premier League club Burnley for a €15 million fee on a five-year deal. On 18 September, he made his Burnley debut as a substitute, replacing Jóhann Berg Guðmundsson in a 1–0 defeat against Arsenal. Cornet scored his first goal for the club in a 2–2 draw against Leicester City on 25 September. Although the season culminated in relegation for Burnley, Cornet finished the season as the team's top scorer with nine goals in 26 appearances.

=== West Ham United ===
On 5 August 2022, Cornet joined West Ham United, signing a five-year contract with a further one-year option, for an undisclosed fee from Burnley. He made his debut on 14 August 2022, in a 0–1 away loss to Nottingham Forest. Cornet also made seven appearances during West Ham's successful 2022–23 UEFA Europa Conference League campaign, though he was an unused substitute in the final victory over Fiorentina.

==== Loans to Southampton and Genoa ====
On 30 August 2024, Cornet joined newly-promoted Premier League club Southampton on a season-long loan. He made his debut for the club on 14 September in a 3–0 home defeat against Manchester United after he replaced Lesley Ugochukwu in the 64th minute. On 20 January 2025, he was recalled from loan.

The same day, Cornet joined Genoa on loan for the remainder of the 2024–25 season.

He played seven games for Genoa before returning to West Ham and on 1 September 2025, he returned for a second loan spell with the club.

== International career ==
Cornet was born in Ivory Coast, and emigrated with his family to northern France at the age of three. He was a youth international for France at every level but declared for the Ivory Coast national team on 5 April 2017. He made his senior debut for Ivory Coast in a 5–0 friendly loss to the Netherlands on 4 June 2017.

== Personal life ==
Cornet has three children. Growing up, he idolised Didier Drogba due to his Ivorian birth and subsequent move to France. Outside of football, he enjoys playing tennis.

== Career statistics ==
=== Club ===
As of match played 26 April 2026

Appearances and goals by club, season and competition
Club	Season	League			National cup (Note: Includes Coupe de France, FA Cup)		League cup (Note: Includes Coupe de la Ligue, EFL Cup)		Europe		Other		Total	
Club	Season	Division	Apps	Goals	Apps	Goals	Apps	Goals	Apps	Goals	Apps	Goals	Apps	Goals
Metz	2012–13	Championnat National	9	1	2	0	0	0	—		—		11	1
Metz	2013–14	Ligue 2	14	0	1	0	1	0	—		—		16	0
Metz	2014–15	Ligue 1	0	0	0	0	0	0	—		—		0	0
Metz	Total		23	1	3	0	1	0	0	0	0	0	27	1
Lyon	2014–15	Ligue 1	4	0	0	0	—		—		—		4	0
Lyon	2015–16	Ligue 1	31	8	3	3	2	0	4 (Note: Appearances in UEFA Champions League)	1	0	0	40	12
Lyon	2016–17	Ligue 1	33	6	2	2	1	0	14 (Note: Six appearances and one goal in UEFA Champions League, eight appearances and one goal in UEFA Europa League)	2	1 (Note: Appearance in Trophée des Champions)	0	51	10
Lyon	2017–18	Ligue 1	30	4	4	2	1	0	8 (Note: Appearances in UEFA Europa League)	1	—		43	7
Lyon	2018–19	Ligue 1	27	7	4	2	0	0	5	3	—		36	12
Lyon	2019–20	Ligue 1	22	4	4	1	4	0	8	1	—		38	6
Lyon	2020–21	Ligue 1	36	2	3	2	—		—		—		39	4
Lyon	2021–22	Ligue 1	1	0	—		—		—		—		1	0
Lyon	Total		184	31	20	12	8	0	39	8	1	0	252	51
Burnley	2021–22	Premier League	26	9	0	0	2	0	—		—		28	9
West Ham United	2022–23	Premier League	14	0	0	0	0	0	7 (Note: Appearances in UEFA Europa Conference League)	0	—		21	0
West Ham United	2023–24	Premier League	7	1	2	0	1	0	6	0	—		16	1
West Ham United	2024–25	Premier League	0	0	0	0	0	0	—		—		0	0
West Ham United	2025–26	Premier League	0	0	0	0	0	0	—		—		0	0
West Ham United	Total		21	1	2	0	1	0	13	0	0	0	37	1
Southampton (loan)	2024–25	Premier League	2	0	0	0	2	0	—		—		4	0
Genoa (loan)	2024–25	Serie A	7	2	—		—		—		—		7	2
Genoa (loan)	2025–26	Serie A	8	0	0	0	—		—		—		8	0
Career total			271	44	25	12	14	0	52	8	1	0	363	64

=== International ===
As of match played 9 September 2023

Appearances and goals by national team and year
National team	Year	Apps	Goals
Ivory Coast	2017	5	1
Ivory Coast	2018	3	1
Ivory Coast	2019	11	3
Ivory Coast	2020	3	0
Ivory Coast	2021	3	1
Ivory Coast	2022	5	0
Ivory Coast	2023	1	0
Total		31	6

As of match played 13 November 2021
Scores and results list Ivory Coast's goal tally first

List of international goals scored by Maxwel Cornet
No.	Date	Venue	Cap	Opponent	Score	Result	Competition
1	5 September 2017	Stade Bouaké, Bouaké, Ivory Coast	3	Gabon	1–2	1–2	2018 FIFA World Cup qualification
2	12 October 2018	Stade Bouaké, Bouaké, Ivory Coast	6	Central African Republic	4–0	4–0	2019 Africa Cup of Nations qualification
3	23 March 2019	Stade Félix Houphouët-Boigny, Abidjan, Ivory Coast	9	Rwanda	3–0	3–0	2019 Africa Cup of Nations qualification
4	19 June 2019	Zayed Sports City Stadium, Abu Dhabi, United Arab Emirates	12	Zambia	3–1	4–1	Friendly
5	1 July 2019	30 June Stadium, Cairo, Egypt	15	Namibia	3–1	4–1	2019 Africa Cup of Nations
6	13 November 2021	Stade de l'Amitié, Cotonou, Benin	24	Mozambique	2–0	3–0	2022 FIFA World Cup qualification

== Honours ==
Metz

- Ligue 2: 2013–14

Lyon

- Coupe de la Ligue runner-up: 2019–20

West Ham United

- UEFA Europa Conference League: 2022–23
