= Corentin Tolisso =

French footballer (born 1994)

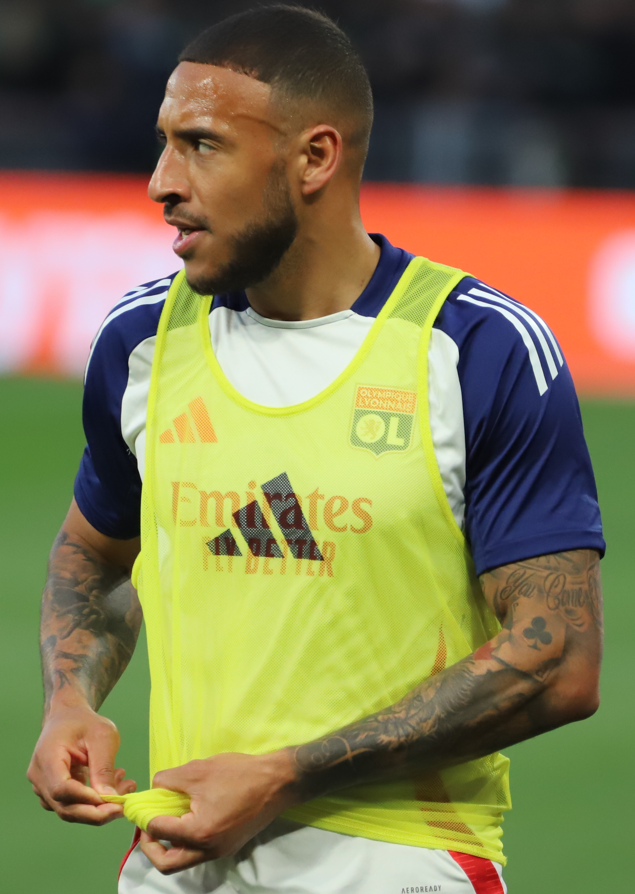
- Tolisso with Lyon in 2025

Personal information
- Full name: Corentin Tolisso
- Date of birth: 3 August 1994 (age 32)
- Place of birth: Tarare, France
- Height: 1.81 m (5 ft 11 in)
- Position: Central midfielder

Team information
- Current team: Lyon
- Number: 8

Youth career
- 2000–2004: Stade Amplepuisien
- 2004–2007: FC Pays de l'Arbresle
- 2007–2013: Lyon

Senior career*
Years	Team	Apps	(Gls)
2012–2014	Lyon II	30	(1)
2013–2017	Lyon	116	(21)
2017–2022	Bayern Munich	72	(11)
2022–	Lyon	128	(23)

International career^{‡}
2012	France U19	1	(0)
2013–2014	France U20	3	(0)
2014–2016	France U21	19	(6)
2017–2021	France	28	(2)
Medal record
Men's football
Representing France
FIFA World Cup
Winner	2018 Russia
- * Club domestic league appearances and goals as of 21:41, 21 November 2026 (UTC) ‡ National team caps and goals as of 23:12, 23 June 2021 (UTC)

Corentin Tolisso (French pronunciation: [kɔʁɑ̃tɛ̃ tɔliso]; born 3 August 1994) is a French professional footballer who plays as a central midfielder for and captains Ligue 1 club Lyon.

A graduate of the Lyon academy, Tolisso made his professional debut for the club in 2013, playing 160 matches and scoring 29 goals. He joined Bayern Munich for €41.5 million in the summer of 2017, a record for a transfer to a German club, before returning to Lyon in 2022.

Tolisso represented France at various youth levels before making his senior debut in 2017. He was part of their squad that won the 2018 FIFA World Cup, also featuring at UEFA Euro 2020.

== Club career ==
=== Early career ===
Tolisso started out with local clubs near his birthplace of Tarare and hometown of Amplepuis. Before becoming a tough-tackling, probing midfielder, he used to play as a forward. Tolisso even scored a hat-trick in a 4–4 draw against his future club Olympique Lyonnais at the age of 11. He then signed up for Lyon's academy in 2007 at the age of 13.

=== Lyon ===
==== 2013–2016 seasons ====
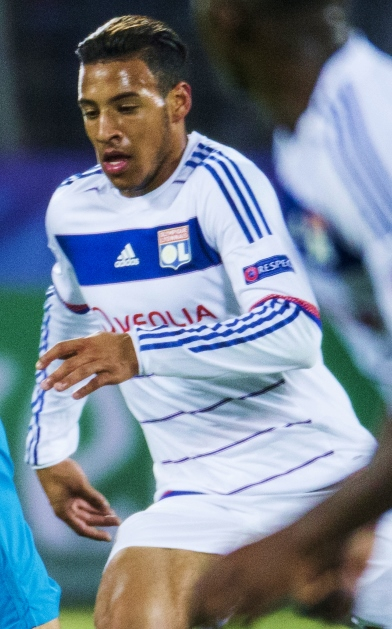
Tolisso playing for Lyon in 2015

On 10 August 2013, manager Rémi Garde handed Tolisso his debut for the club, bringing him on as 92nd minute substitute in a 4–0 Ligue 1 home win over Nice, but he didn't even touch the ball once as the referee blew the whistle few seconds later. He made his European club competition debut on 24 October 2013, featuring in a 1–0 win over HNK Rijeka in the group stage of the 2013–14 UEFA Europa League. A week later, Tolisso signed his first professional contract with the club, penning a deal until 2017. On 9 March 2014, he scored his first senior career goal with an injury time (in the 94th minute) winner to give Lyon a 2–1 Ligue 1 away win over Bordeaux. Tolisso was used as a utility player for the majority of the season, operating at right back in place of Mouhamadou Dabo and later in central midfield following injuries to Yoann Gourcuff and Gueïda Fofana.

The continued absence of Fofana and subsequent injury to Clément Grenier afforded Tolisso the opportunity to enjoy more first team action with Lyon in the following season. During the 2014–15 season he featured in every Ligue 1 match for the side, netting seven goals. At the end of the season Tolisso and teammates Nabil Fekir and Anthony Lopes were rewarded with improved contracts, penning new deals with the club until 2020. He continued his fine form into the 2015–16 Ligue 1 season where he netted five goals and set up six assists as Lyon ended the Ligue 1 season as runners-up to Paris Saint-Germain.

==== 2016–17 season ====
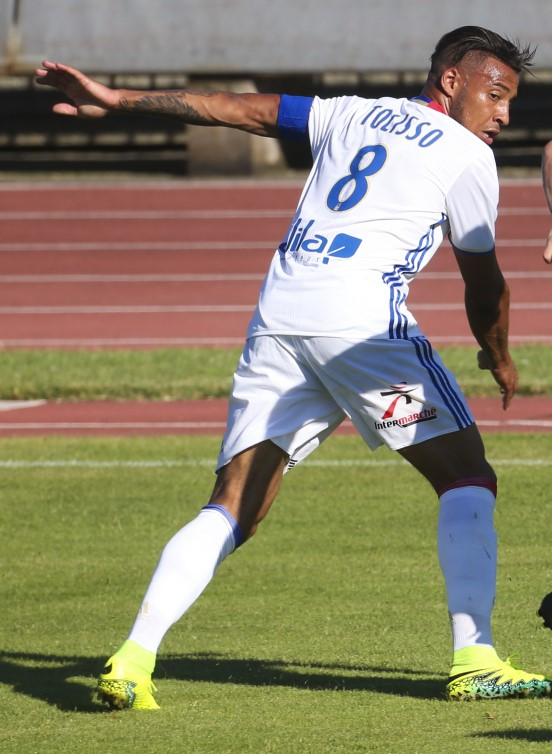
Tolisso playing for Lyon in 2016

Tolisso's form in the previous season earned him numerous suitors from around Europe and in July 2016 he was subject to a €37.5 million bid from Serie A side Napoli. He turned down the move and reaffirmed his commitment to Lyon, however, citing his affection for the club and belief in their progress as his reasons for staying at the club.

He made his first appearance of the season in the 2016 Trophée des Champions on 6 August 2016 where Lyon were beaten 4–1 by reigning Ligue 1 champions Paris Saint-Germain. Tolisso himself found the back of the net in the 87th minute but the goal proved to be no more than a consolation. Tolisso scored his first Ligue 1 goal of the season on 27 August, opening the scoring in a 4–2 away loss to Dijon, and his first ever goal (in the 13th minute) in a UEFA club competition on 14 September in a 3–0 UEFA Champions League group stage home win over Dinamo Zagreb.

On 2 October 2016, with regular captain Maxime Gonalons and vice-captain Alexandre Lacazette injured, Tolisso was handed the armband in their stead and captained Lyon in the first ever Rhône derby against Saint-Étienne at Lyon's new stadium, Parc Olympique Lyonnais. In the return fixture on 5 February, Tolisso received the first red card of his career after being sent off for a foul on Fabien Lemoine in stoppage-time. Just moments before Tolisso's expulsion, Lyon teammate Rachid Ghezzal had been sent off as well for a challenge on the same player. The ill-discipline shown in Lyon's loss to Saint-Étienne prompted club president Jean-Michel Aulas to announce that both players would be severely punished for their actions. Tolisso remained a constant fixture in the side, however, and ended the 2016–17 season with a return of 14 goals and seven assists in 47 appearances across all competitions for Lyon. He was also named in the UEFA Europa League squad of the season.

=== Bayern Munich ===
==== 2017–18 season ====
On 14 June 2017, Bundesliga side Bayern Munich secured the signing of Tolisso on a five-year deal from Lyon for an initial transfer fee of €41.5 million, plus up to €6 million in potential bonuses. The fee was the largest ever received by Lyon from the sale of a player, though this record was again broken on 5 July 2017 by the transfer of Alexandre Lacazette to Arsenal for a fee of €53 million. It was also a Bundesliga and Bayern record for a signing, surpassing the previous record of €40 million that the club spent in buying Javi Martínez from Athletic Bilbao in August 2012.

He made his debut for the club on 5 August, starting in a penalty shoot-out victory over Borussia Dortmund which saw Bayern crowned Supercup champions. He then scored on his Bundesliga debut on 18 August, netting Bayern's second goal in a 3–1 win over Bayer Leverkusen. On 5 December 2017, with qualification to the Champions League knockout stages already secured, Tolisso netted a brace in Bayern's final group match to earn the club a 3–1 win over PSG; though the result was not enough to see Bayern claim top spot. On 3 April 2018, he scored a thumping long-range goal to double the lead in a 4–0 away victory over SC Freiburg.

On 7 April, Tolisso equalised as Bayern came from behind to defeat FC Augsburg 4–1 and win the league title with five games remaining.

==== 2018–2022 ====
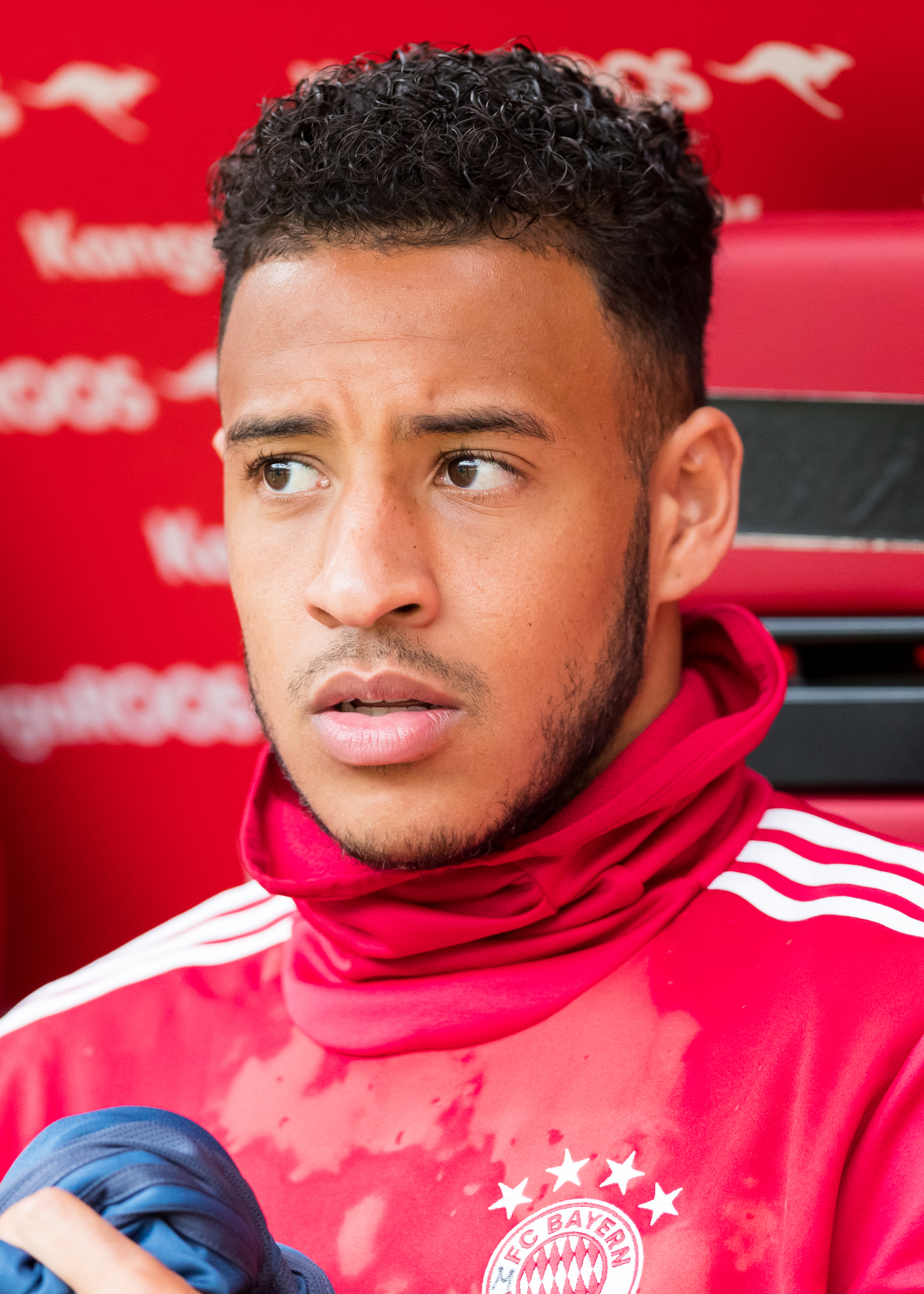
Tolisso in 2019.

Tolisso started the 2018–19 season as a World Cup champion after winning the title with France. On Matchday 3 in the Bundesliga, Tolisso ruptured a cruciate ligament in his right knee in a 3–1 victory against Bayer Leverkusen on Saturday, September 15. Following the injury, France national team coach Didier Deschamps was convinced that Tolisso will "come back as strong, if not even stronger". He also believes that the 2019 season will be "much better for you". During Bayern's winter trip training in January 2019 in Doha, Qatar, Tolisso was reported to be able to jog on an anti-gravity treadmill without any problems. He was set to return to the pitch in March 2019, which, according to Bayern Munich coach Niko Kovač, was "earlier than expected".

He made a total of 28 appearances and scored four goals in the 2019–20 treble winning season. He came on as a second half substitute in the UCL final in a 1–0 win over Paris Saint-Germain. On 21 October 2020, Tolisso scored a stunning goal in a 4–0 win against Atlético Madrid in the first match of the 2020–21 UEFA Champions League group stages. On 30 May 2022, Bayern announced that Tolisso was to leave the club after the end of the season.

=== Return to Lyon ===
On 1 July 2022, Lyon confirmed Tolisso's return to the club on a five-year deal until 2027. He was named as club's captain ahead of the 2025–26 season following the departure of Alexandre Lacazette. On 27 November 2025, he scored his first senior career hat-trick in a 6–0 away win over Maccabi Tel Aviv in the Europa League.

== International career ==
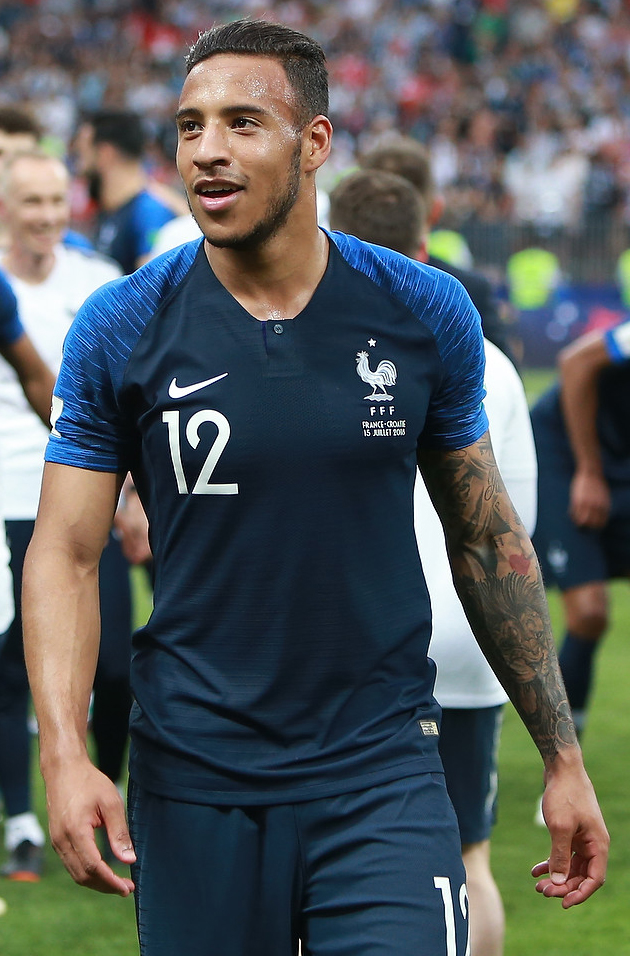
Tolisso with France at the 2018 FIFA World Cup Final

Though born in France, and having represented the nation at various youth levels, including the U21 side with whom he was the captain, Tolisso was also eligible to represent Togo through his paternal lineage. In 2016, Togo manager Claude Le Roy revealed that he would try to convince Tolisso to represent the nation instead of France. Tolisso had previously acknowledged his ties to Togo but was loyal to France, stating that "I was born here and grew up here."

Having previously represented France at various youth levels, Tolisso was called up to the senior squad for the first time to face Luxembourg and Spain in March 2017. He made his debut on 28 March 2017 against the latter, starting the game and being replaced by Thomas Lemar in the 80th minute of a 2–0 friendly home loss.

On 17 May 2018, he was called up to the 23-man French squad for the 2018 FIFA World Cup in Russia. He played for the first 78 minutes and was later subbed off in a 2–1 victory over Australia in their first group stage match on 16 June. Tolisso did not play the last two group stage matches against Peru and Denmark. On 30 June, he replaced Blaise Matuidi in the 75th minute in a 4–3 victory over Argentina in the round of 16 match. On 6 July, Tolisso started the quarter-final match against Uruguay and provided an assist to Antoine Griezmann's goal which saw France advance following a 2–0 victory. He was subbed on to replace Matuidi in the 86th minute in a 1–0 semi-final victory over Belgium on 10 July. On 15 July, Tolisso appeared in the 73rd minute, again replacing Matuidi, as France defeated Croatia 4–2 in the final, to win their second World Cup title. On 17 November 2019, Tolisso scored his first goal for France in a 2–0 win against Albania, during the UEFA Euro 2020 qualification.

== Career statistics ==
=== Club ===
As of match played 21 November 2026

Appearances and goals by club, season and competition
Club	Season	League			National cup (Note: Includes Coupe de France, DFB-Pokal)		League cup (Note: Includes Coupe de la Ligue)		Europe		Other		Total	
Club	Season	Division	Apps	Goals	Apps	Goals	Apps	Goals	Apps	Goals	Apps	Goals	Apps	Goals
Lyon	2013–14	Ligue 1	14	1	1	0	1	0	9 (Note: Appearances in UEFA Europa League)	0	—		25	1
Lyon	2014–15	Ligue 1	38	7	2	0	0	0	3	0	—		43	7
Lyon	2015–16	Ligue 1	33	5	4	1	2	1	6 (Note: Appearances in UEFA Champions League)	0	0	0	45	7
Lyon	2016–17	Ligue 1	31	8	1	1	0	0	14 (Note: Six appearances and two goals in UEFA Champions League, eight appearances and two goals in UEFA Europa League)	4	1 (Note: Appearance in Trophée des Champions)	1	47	14
Lyon	Total		116	21	8	2	3	1	32	4	1	1	160	29
Bayern Munich	2017–18	Bundesliga	26	6	5	1	—		8	3	1 (Note: Appearance in DFL-Supercup)	0	40	10
Bayern Munich	2018–19	Bundesliga	2	1	2	0	—		0	0	0	0	4	1
Bayern Munich	2019–20	Bundesliga	13	1	4	0	—		10	3	1	0	28	4
Bayern Munich	2020–21	Bundesliga	16	1	1	0	—		3	1	4 (Note: One appearance in DFL-Supercup, one appearance in UEFA Super Cup, two appearances in FIFA Club World Cup)	1	24	3
Bayern Munich	2021–22	Bundesliga	15	2	2	1	—		4	0	1	0	22	3
Bayern Munich	Total		72	11	14	2	—		25	7	7	1	118	21
Lyon	2022–23	Ligue 1	30	1	4	0	—		—		—		34	1
Lyon	2023–24	Ligue 1	25	2	5	0	—		—		—		30	2
Lyon	2024–25	Ligue 1	32	7	2	0	—		12	3	—		46	10
Lyon	2025–26	Ligue 1	30	11	2	0	—		7	4	—		39	15
Lyon	2026–27	Ligue 1	11	2	0	0	—		8 (Note: Four appearances in UEFA Champions League, Four appearances and two goals in UEFA Europa League)	1	—		19	4
Lyon	Total		128	23	13	0	—		28	9	—		167	32
Career total			316	52	35	4	3	1	84	20	8	2	445	81

=== International ===
As of match played 23 June 2021

Appearances and goals by national team and year
National team	Year	Apps	Goals
France	2017	5	0
France	2018	10	0
France	2019	6	1
France	2020	2	1
France	2021	5	0
Total		28	2

As of match played 23 June 2021. France score listed first, score column indicates score after each Tolisso goal.

List of international goals scored by Corentin Tolisso
No.	Date	Venue	Cap	Opponent	Score	Result	Competition
1	17 November 2019	Arena Kombëtare, Tirana, Albania	21	Albania	1–0	2–0	UEFA Euro 2020 qualification
2	7 October 2020	Stade de France, Saint-Denis, France	22	Ukraine	5–1	7–1	Friendly

== Honours ==
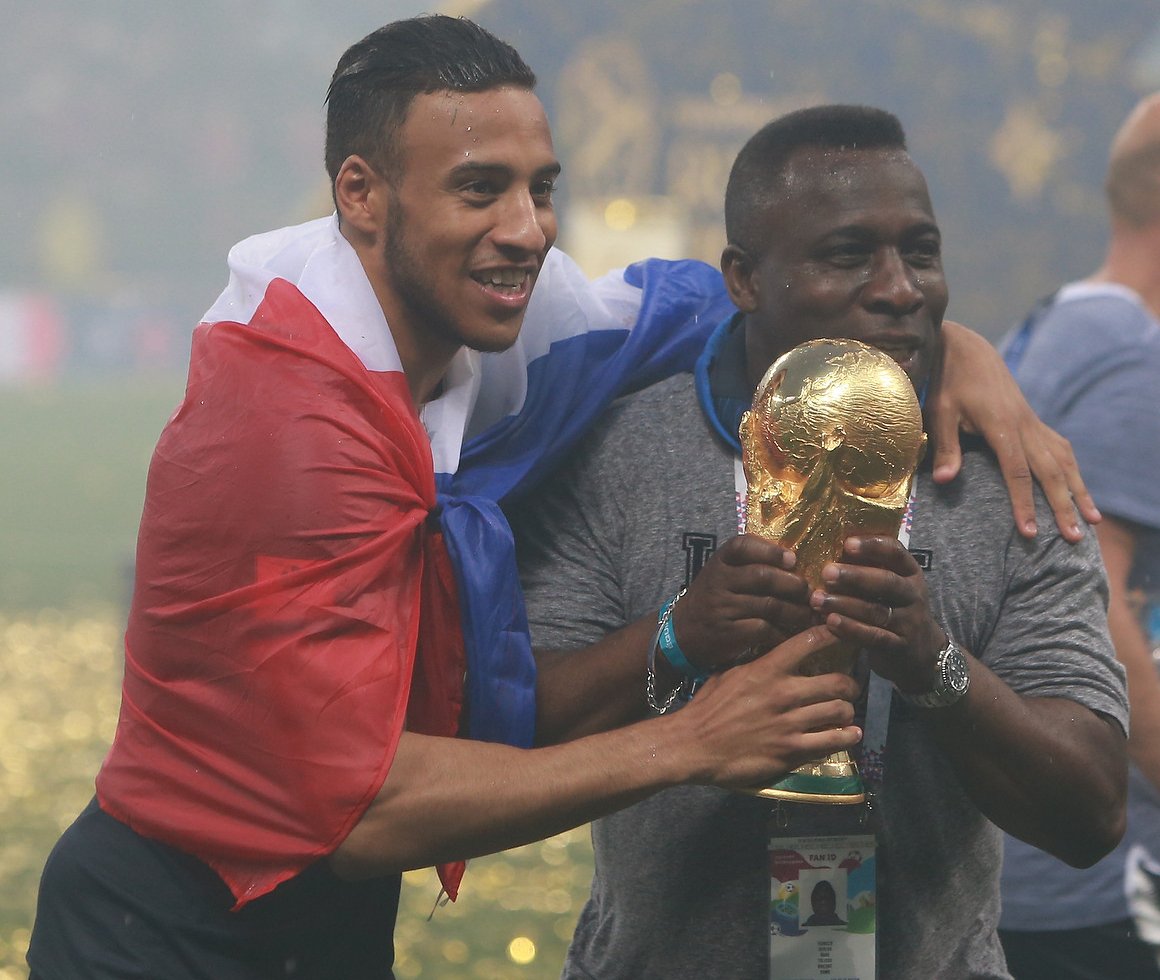
Tolisso holding the FIFA World Cup Trophy with his father

Bayern Munich

- Bundesliga: 2017–18, 2018–19, 2019–20, 2020–21, 2021–22
- DFB-Pokal: 2018–19, 2019–20
- DFL-Supercup: 2017, 2020, 2021
- UEFA Champions League: 2019–20
- UEFA Super Cup: 2020
- FIFA Club World Cup: 2020

Lyon

- Coupe de France runner-up: 2023–24

France

- FIFA World Cup: 2018

Individual

- UEFA Europa League Squad of the Season: 2016–17
- Bundesliga Goal of the Month: January 2022
- UNFP Ligue 1 Team of the Year: 2025–26

Orders

- Knight of the Legion of Honour: 2018
