= 2016–17 Olympique Lyonnais season =

Lyon
2016–17 season
- Owner: OL Groupe
- Chairman: Jean-Michel Aulas
- Manager: Bruno Génésio
- Stadium: Parc Olympique Lyonnais
- Ligue 1: 4th
- Trophée des Champions: Runners-up
- Coupe de la Ligue: Round of 16
- Coupe de France: Round of 64
- UEFA Champions League: Group stage
- UEFA Europa League: Semi-finals
- Top goalscorer: League: Alexandre Lacazette (28); All: Alexandre Lacazette (37)
- Highest home attendance: 57,050 vs. Saint-Étienne (2 October 2016)
- Lowest home attendance: 12,096 vs. Montpellier (8 January 2017)
Home colours	Away colours	Third colours

The 2016–17 season was Olympique Lyonnais's 67th professional season since its creation in 1950.

== Players ==
=== Squad information ===
Note: Flags indicate national team as defined under FIFA eligibility rules; some limited exceptions apply. Players may hold more than one non-FIFA nationality.

No.	Pos.	Nation	Player
1	GK	POR	Anthony Lopes
2	DF	FRA	Mapou Yanga-Mbiwa
3	DF	CMR	Nicolas Nkoulou
4	DF	ARG	Emanuel Mammana
5	DF	FRA	Mouctar Diakhaby
8	MF	FRA	Corentin Tolisso
10	FW	FRA	Alexandre Lacazette
11	MF	ALG	Rachid Ghezzal
12	MF	FRA	Jordan Ferri
13	DF	FRA	Christophe Jallet
14	MF	ESP	Sergi Darder
15	DF	FRA	Jérémy Morel
16	GK	FRA	Lucas Mocio
18	FW	FRA	Nabil Fekir

No.	Pos.	Nation	Player
19	FW	NED	Memphis Depay
20	DF	BRA	Rafael
21	MF	FRA	Maxime Gonalons
22	FW	FRA	Gaëtan Perrin
23	DF	FRA	Jordy Gaspar
24	MF	FRA	Olivier Kemen
25	MF	FRA	Houssem Aouar
26	FW	FRA	Aldo Kalulu
27	FW	CIV	Maxwel Cornet
28	MF	FRA	Mathieu Valbuena
29	MF	FRA	Lucas Tousart
30	GK	FRA	Mathieu Gorgelin
31	DF	POL	Maciej Rybus
46	MF	LUX	Christopher Martins Pereira

== Transfers ==
=== In ===
Date	Pos.	Player	Age	Moved from	Fee	Notes
1 July 2016	DF	(Cameroon) Nicolas Nkoulou	26	(France) Marseille	Free Transfer	
1 July 2016	DF	(Poland) Maciej Rybus	26	(Russia) Terek Grozny	Free Transfer	
6 July 2016	DF	(Argentina) Emanuel Mammana	20	(Argentina) River Plate	Undisclosed	
20 January 2017	FW	(Netherlands) Memphis Depay	22	(England) Manchester United	€16,000,000	

=== Out ===
Date	Pos.	Player	Age	Moved to	Fee	Notes
1 July 2016	MF	(France) Steed Malbranque	36	(France) Caen	Free Transfer	
1 July 2016	DF	(Cameroon) Henri Bedimo	32	(France) Marseille	Free Transfer	
1 July 2016	DF	(Burkina Faso) Bakary Koné	28	(Spain) Málaga	€800,000	
1 July 2016	DF	(France) Lindsay Rose	24	(France) Lorient	€1,500,000	
25 July 2016	MF	(France) Arnold Mvuemba	31	(Turkey) Akhisarspor	Free Transfer	
27 July 2016	MF	(France) Zakarie Labidi	21	(France) Stade Brest	Free Transfer	
12 July 2016	DF	(France) Samuel Umtiti	22	(Spain) Barcelona	€25,000,000	

==== Loans out ====
Date	Pos.	Player	Age	Loaned to	Return date	Notes
2 July 2016	MF	(France) Romain Del Castillo	20	(France) Bourg-en-Bresse	30 June 2017	
5 July 2016	DF	(France) Louis Nganioni	21	(France) Stade Brest	30 June 2017	
28 January 2017	MF	(France) Clément Grenier	26	(Italy) Roma	30 June 2017	

== Competitions ==
=== Overall ===
Competition	Started round	Final position	First match	Last match
Ligue 1	Matchday 1	4th	14 August 2016	20 May 2017
Trophée des Champions	Final	Runners-up	6 August 2016	
Coupe de la Ligue	Round of 16		14 December 2016	
Coupe de France	Round of 64	Round of 32	8 January 2017	31 January 2017
Champions League	Group stage		14 September 2016	7 December 2016
Europa League	Round of 32	Semi-finals	16 February 2017	11 May 2017

=== Trophée des Champions ===
6 August 2016	Paris Saint-Germain	4–1	Lyon	Klagenfurt, Austria
20:45 CEST (UTC+02:00)	Pastore 9'; Lucas 19'; Ben Arfa 34'; Kurzawa 54'	Report	Yanga-Mbiwa (yellow card) 30'; Lacazette (yellow card) 36'; Tolisso 87'	Stadium: Wörthersee Stadion; Attendance: 10,120; Referee: Alexander Harkam (Austria)

=== Ligue 1 ===
==== League table ====
Pos	Team	Pld	W	D	L	GF	GA	GD	Pts	Qualification or relegation
2	Paris Saint-Germain	38	27	6	5	83	27	+56	87	Qualification for the Champions League group stage
3	Nice	38	22	12	4	63	36	+27	78	Qualification for the Champions League third qualifying round
4	Lyon	38	21	4	13	77	48	+29	67	Qualification for the Europa League group stage (Note: Since the winners of the 2016–17 Coupe de France and the 2016–17 Coupe de la Ligue, Paris Saint-Germain, qualified for European competition based on league position, the spot awarded to the Coupe de France winners (Europa League group stage) was passed to the fourth-placed team and the spot awarded to the Coupe de la Ligue winners (Europa League third qualifying round) was passed to the sixth-placed team. The fifth-placed team received the spot in Europa League third qualifying round originally designated to the fourth-placed team.)
5	Marseille	38	17	11	10	57	41	+16	62	Qualification for the Europa League third qualifying round
6	Bordeaux	38	15	14	9	53	43	+10	59	Qualification for the Europa League third qualifying round

Source: Ligue 1, Soccerway
Rules for classification: 1) Points; 2) Goal difference; 3) Goals scored; 4) Head-to-head goal difference; 5) Fairplay ranking.

==== Results summary ====
Overall								Home						Away					
Pld	W	D	L	GF	GA	GD	Pts	W	D	L	GF	GA	GD	W	D	L	GF	GA	GD
38	21	4	13	77	48	+29	67	12	1	6	46	26	+20	9	3	7	31	22	+9

Last updated: 20 May 2017.
Source: Competitive matches

==== Results by round ====
Round	1	2	3	4	5	6	7	8	9	10	11	12	13	14	15	16	17	18	19	20	21	22	23	24	25	26	27	28	29	30	31	32	33	34	35	36	37	38
Ground	A	H	A	H	A	H	A	H	A	H	A	H	A	H	A	A	H	A	H	A	H	H	A	H	A	H	H	A	H	A	A	H	A	H	A	H	A	H
Result	W	W	L	L	D	W	L	W	L	L	W	W	W	L	W	W	W	W	W	W	W	L	L	W	L	W	W	D	W	L	D	L	W	L	W	W	W	D
Position	1	1	4	8	9	7	9	5	8	10	8	7	4	7	4	4	4	4	4	4	4	4	4	4	4	4	4	4	4	4	4	4	4	4	4	4	4	4

Source: Competitive matches
A = Away; H = Home; W = Win; D = Draw; L = Loss

==== Matches ====
14 August 2016 1	Nancy	0–3	Lyon	Tomblaine
15:00 CEST (UTC+02:00)	Cuffaut (yellow card) 27'; N'Guessan (yellow card) 40'; Muratori (yellow card) 43'; Badila (yellow card) 78'	Report	Nkoulou (yellow card) 29'; Lacazette 33', 44', 90+2'; Rafael (yellow card) 35'	Stadium: Stade Marcel Picot; Attendance: 18,885; Referee: Amaury Delerue

19 August 2016 2	Lyon	2–0	Caen	Décines-Charpieu
20:45 CEST (UTC+02:00)	Lacazette 31' (pen.), 90+6' (pen.), (yellow card) 87'; Yanga-Mbiwa (yellow card) 69'; Gonalons (yellow card) 90+4'	Report	Dabo (yellow card) 28'; Santini (yellow card) 30'; Malbranque (yellow card) 90+1'; Ben Youssef (yellow card) 90+5'	Stadium: Parc Olympique Lyonnais; Attendance: 41,171; Referee: Benoît Millot

27 August 2016 3	Dijon	4–2	Lyon	Dijon
17:00 CEST (UTC+02:00)	Sammaritano 24' (pen.); Tavares 45+1'; Amalfitano (yellow card) 45+2'; Balmont (yellow card) 55'; Bahamboula 73'; Lees-Melou 88'	Report	Tolisso 20'; Nkoulou (yellow card) 22'; Lacazette 37'; Gonalons (yellow card) 74'	Stadium: Stade Gaston Gérard; Attendance: 10,369; Referee: Johan Hamel

10 September 2016 4	Lyon	1–3	Bordeaux	Décines-Charpieu
17:00 CEST (UTC+02:00)	Kalulu 2'; Gonalons (red card) 67'; Rafael (yellow card) 75'; Ghezzal (yellow card) 85'	Report	Malcom 33'; Contento (yellow card) 60'; Sertic 71'; Ménez 90'	Stadium: Parc Olympique Lyonnais; Attendance: 40,976; Referee: Ruddy Buquet

17 September 2016 5	Marseille	0–0	Lyon	Marseille
21:00 CEST (UTC+02:00)	Hubočan (yellow card) 28'; Zambo Anguissa (yellow card) 77'; Machach (yellow card) 83'	Report	Tousart (yellow card) 68'; Yanga-Mbiwa (yellow card) 81'	Stadium: Stade Vélodrome; Attendance: 32,564; Referee: Antony Gautier

21 September 2016 6	Lyon	5–1	Montpellier	Décines-Charpieu
19:00 CEST (UTC+02:00)	Fekir 36', 57'; Tolisso 42', 71'; Cornet 75'	Report	M. Sanson 4'; Poaty (red card) 8'; Deplagne (yellow card) 36'	Stadium: Parc Olympique Lyonnais; Attendance: 32,193; Referee: Bartolomeu Varela

24 September 2016 7	Lorient	1–0	Lyon	Lorient
17:00 CEST (UTC+02:00)	Cabot 51', (yellow card) 63'; Cafú (yellow card) 90'	Report	Valbuena (yellow card) 82'	Stadium: Stade du Moustoir; Attendance: 10,628; Referee: Mikaël Lesage

2 October 2016 8	Lyon	2–0	Saint-Étienne	Décines-Charpieu
20:45 CEST (UTC+02:00)	Morel (yellow card) 40'; Darder 41'; Valbuena (yellow card) 56'; Ferri (yellow card) 67'; Ghezzal 89'	Report	Lacroix (yellow card) 33'	Stadium: Parc Olympique Lyonnais; Attendance: 57,050; Referee: Clément Turpin

14 October 2016 9	Nice	2–0	Lyon	Nice
20:45 CEST (UTC+02:00)	Baysse 5'; Henrique (yellow card) 25'; Dante (yellow card) 71'; Seri 76'; Balotelli (yellow card) 85'	Report	Morel (yellow card) 21'; Fekir (red card) 28'; Darder (yellow card) 43'; Gaspar (yellow card) 80'	Stadium: Allianz Riviera; Attendance: 28,139; Referee: Ruddy Buquet

22 October 2016 10	Lyon	1–3	Guingamp	Décines-Charpieu
17:00 CEST (UTC+02:00)	Lacazette 37' (pen.); Tolisso (yellow card) 67'	Report	Diallo (yellow card) 36'; Salibur 46'; Coco 52', 77'; Kerbrat (yellow card) 53'; Ikoko (yellow card) 72'	Stadium: Parc Olympique Lyonnais; Attendance: 39,184; Referee: Antony Gautier

29 October 2016 11	Toulouse	1–2	Lyon	Toulouse
17:00 CEST (UTC+02:00)	Jullien 26'; Sylla (yellow card) 32'; Durmaz (yellow card) 35'	Report	Lacazette 15' (pen.), 52', (yellow card) 90+3'; Rafael (yellow card) 43' (yellow-red card) 56'; Mammana (yellow card) 54'	Stadium: Stadium Municipal; Attendance: 21,141; Referee: Benoît Millot

5 November 2016 12	Lyon	2–1	Bastia	Décines-Charpieu
20:00 CEST (UTC+02:00)	Fekir (yellow card) 3'; Lacazette 37' (pen.); Bengtsson 86' (o.g.)	Report	Danic (yellow card) 1'; Diallo (yellow card) 41'; Leca (red card) 47'; Cahuzac (yellow card) 67' (yellow-red card) 74'; Crivelli 90+2'	Stadium: Parc Olympique Lyonnais; Attendance: 33,886; Referee: Frank Schneider

18 November 2016 13	Lille	0–1	Lyon	Lille
20:45 CEST (UTC+02:00)	Sankharé (yellow card) 21' (yellow-red card) 55'; Corchia (yellow card) 26'; De Préville (yellow card) 46'	Report	Cornet 3', (yellow card) 32'; Rafael (yellow card) 73'; Diakhaby (yellow card) 76'	Stadium: Stade Pierre-Mauroy; Attendance: 28,660; Referee: Jérôme Miguelgorry

27 November 2016 14	Lyon	1–2	Paris Saint-Germain	Décines-Charpieu
20:45 CET (UTC+1)	Ferri (yellow card) 45+2'; Valbuena 58'	Report	Ben Arfa (yellow card) 19'; Cavani 30' (pen.), 81'; Matuidi (yellow card) 43'; Motta (yellow card) 75'; Aurier (yellow card) 83'; Silva (yellow card) 86'; Verratti (yellow card) 89'	Stadium: Parc Olympique Lyonnais; Attendance: 55,107; Referee: Ruddy Buquet

30 November 2016 15	Nantes	0–6	Lyon	Nantes
19:00	Lucas Lima (yellow card) 25'; Kačaniklić (yellow card) 49'; Walongwa (yellow card) 55'; Vizcarrondo (yellow card) 78'	Report	Tolisso 16'; Lacazette 39' (pen.); Gonalons 42'; Valbuena 60'; Diakhaby 75'; Fekir 81'	Stadium: Stade de la Beaujoire; Attendance: 18,964; Referee: Clément Turpin

3 December 2016 16	Metz	1–0; Abandoned	Lyon	Metz
20:00 CEST (UTC+2)	Hein 28'	Report		Stadium: Stade Saint-Symphorien; Attendance: 26,000; Referee: Lionel Jaffredo

11 December 2016 17	Lyon	1–0	Rennes	Décines-Charpieu
15:00 CEST (UTC+2)	Valbuena 28'; Rafael (yellow card) 43'; Yanga-Mbiwa (yellow card) 52'; Darder (yellow card) 90+3'	Report	Bensebaini (red card) 74'	Stadium: Parc Olympique Lyonnais; Attendance: 33,901; Referee: Benoît Millot

18 December 2016 18	Monaco	1–3	Lyon	Fontvieille
20:45 CET (UTC+1)	Sidibé (yellow card) 26'; Mendy (red card) 39'; Silva (yellow card) 52'; Fabinho (yellow card) 53'; Glik (yellow card) 56'; Bakayoko 70'	Report	Ghezzal 29'; Yanga-Mbiwa (yellow card) 42'; Valbuena 65', (yellow card) 74'; Lacazette 87'	Stadium: Stade Louis II; Attendance: 13,129; Referee: Ruddy Buquet

21 December 2016 19	Lyon	2–0	Angers	Décines-Charpieu
20:45 CEST (UTC+2)	Lacazette 9'; Fekir 84'	Report	Diedhiou (yellow card) 34'; Pavlović (yellow card) 77'	Stadium: Parc Olympique Lyonnais; Attendance: 32,098; Referee: Frank Schneider

15 January 2017 20	Caen	3–2	Lyon	Caen
17:00 CEST (UTC+2)	Guilbert (yellow card) 1'; Cornet 8' (o.g.); Santini 29' (pen.), 61', (yellow card) 41'; Bazile (yellow card) 84'	Report	Lacazette 35' (pen.), 45'; Diakhaby (yellow card) 39'; Fekir (yellow card) 48'; Rybus (yellow card) 87'	Stadium: Stade Michel d'Ornano; Referee: Frank Schenider

22 January 2017 21	Lyon	3–1	Marseille	Lyon
21:00 CEST (UTC+2)	Yanga-Mbiwa (yellow card) 37'; Valbuena 43'; Lacazette 61', 75'	Report	Fanni (yellow card) 48'; Dória 67'; Sakai (yellow card) 85'	Stadium: Parc Olympique Lyonnais; Attendance: 48,147; Referee: Ruddy Buquet

28 January 2017 22	Lyon	1–2	Lille	Décines-Charpieu
17:00 CEST (UTC+2)	Valbuena (yellow card) 58'; Lacazette 86' (pen.)	Report	Sankharé (yellow card) 16'; Benzia 38', 80' (pen.); Bauthéac (yellow card) 80'; Bissouma (yellow card) 90+5'	Stadium: Parc Olympique Lyonnais; Attendance: 35,479; Referee: Johan Hamel

5 February 2017 23	Saint-Étienne	2–0	Lyon	Saint-Étienne
21:00 CEST (UTC+2)	Monnet-Paquet 9'; Hamouma 22'; Søderlund (yellow card) 69'; Pajot (yellow card) 74'	Report	Fekir (yellow card) 43'; Lacazette (yellow card) 61'; Ghezzal (yellow card) 86' (yellow-red card) 90+2'; Tolisso (red card) 90+3'	Stadium: Stade Geoffroy-Guichard; Attendance: 37,029; Referee: Tony Chapron

8 February 2017 24	Lyon	4–0	Nancy	Décines-Charpieu
19:00 CEST (UTC+2)	Valbuena 39'; Fekir 43'; Gonalons (yellow card) 50'; Lacazette 54' (pen.); Depay 58'	Report	Mandanne (yellow card) 81'	Stadium: Parc Olympique Lyonnais; Attendance: 28,349; Referee: Bartolomeu Varela

11 February 2017 25	Guingamp	2–1	Lyon	Guingamp
17:00 CEST (UTC+2)	Diallo 30'; Benezet 34'; Sankoh (yellow card) 35'; Martins Pereira (yellow card) 59'	Report	Lacazette 10'; Diakhaby (yellow card) 20'; Yanga-Mbiwa (yellow card) 27'	Stadium: Stade de Roudourou; Attendance: 15,242; Referee: Frank Schneider

19 February 2017 26	Lyon	4–2	Dijon	Décines-Charpieu
17:00 CEST (UTC+2)	Tolisso 11', 80'; Mammana (yellow card) 70'; Lacazette 84' (pen.); Fekir 90'	Report	Júlio Tavares 29', (yellow card) 83'; Diony 48'; Balmont (yellow card) 55'; Haddadi (yellow card) 57'; Amalfitano (yellow card) 66'	Stadium: Parc Olympique Lyonnais; Attendance: 35,197; Referee: Benoît Millot

26 February 2017 27	Lyon	5–0	Metz	Décines-Charpieu
17:00 CEST (UTC+2)	Depay 43', 53'; Diakhaby (yellow card) 72'; Iván Balliu 74' (o.g.); Lacazette 78'; Valbuena 90+2'	Report	Vion (yellow card) 5'; Diagne (yellow card) 21'; Doukouré (yellow card) 41'	Stadium: Parc Olympique Lyonnais; Attendance: 32,488; Referee: François Letexier

3 March 2017 28	Bordeaux	1–1	Lyon	Bordeaux
20:45 CEST (UTC+2)	Vada 16'; Gajić (yellow card) 26'; Jovanović (yellow card) 36'; Malcom (yellow card) 38'; Toulalan (yellow card) 57'; Pallois (yellow card) 90'	Report	Morel (yellow card) 4'; Gonalons (yellow card) 21'; Mammana 79'; Valbuena (yellow card) 85'; Ferri (yellow card) 90'	Stadium: Matmut Atlantique; Attendance: 31,511; Referee: Frank Schneider

12 March 2017 29	Lyon	4–0	Toulouse	Décines-Charpieu
17:00 CEST (UTC+2)	Sergi Darder (yellow card) 4'; Jallet 36'; Cornet 47'; Depay 53', 82'	Report	Yago (yellow card) 32'; Trejo (yellow card) 88'	Stadium: Parc Olympique Lyonnais; Attendance: 34,463; Referee: Benoît Bastien

19 March 2017 30	Paris Saint-Germain	2–1	Lyon	Paris
21:00 CEST (UTC+2)	Rabiot (yellow card) 16', (goal) 34'; Cavani (yellow card) 20'; Draxler 40'	Report	Lacazette 6'; Gonalons (yellow card) 64'	Stadium: Parc des Princes; Attendance: 47,253; Referee: Clément Turpin

2 April 2017 31	Stade Rennais	1–1	Lyon	Rennes
15:00 CEST (UTC+2)	Bensebaini (red card) 5'; Danzé (yellow card) 60'; Mubele 82'	Report	Lacazette (penalty missed) 5'; Cornet 53'; Yanga-Mbiwa (yellow card) 90+2'	Stadium: Roazhon Park; Attendance: 23,673; Referee: Antony Gautier

5 April 2017 16	Metz	0–3	Lyon	Metz
19:00 CEST (UTC+2)	Mollet (yellow card) 4'; Philipps (yellow card) 36'; Mandjeck (yellow card) 76'	Report	Diakhaby (yellow card) 56'; Lacazette 59'; Ferri 87'; Tolisso 90+1'	Stadium: Stade Saint-Symphorien; Attendance: 0 Referee: Ruddy Buquet

8 April 2017 32	Lyon	1–4	Lorient	Décines-Charpieu
20:00 CEST (UTC+2)	Rafael (yellow card) 12'; Tolisso 28'; Fekir (yellow card) 44'; Mammana (yellow card) 83'	Report	Lautoa (yellow card) 39'; Waris 42'; Marveaux 49'; Moukandjo 73', 80'	Stadium: Parc Olympique Lyonnais; Attendance: 35,595; Referee: Nicolas Rainville

16 April 2017 33	Bastia	0–3; Forfeited	Lyon	Bastia
17:55 CEST (UTC+2)		Report		Stadium: Stade Armand Cesari; Attendance: 15,000; Referee: Amaury Delerue

23 April 2017 34	Lyon	1–2	Monaco	Décines-Charpieu
21:00 CEST (UTC+2)	Ferri (yellow card) 22'; Tousart 51'; Rafael (yellow card) 67'	Report	Falcao 36'; Mbappé 44'; Lemar (yellow card) 65'	Stadium: Parc Olympique Lyonnais; Attendance: 44,411; Referee: Benoît Bastien

28 April 2017 35	Angers	1–2	Lyon	Angers
20:45 CEST (UTC+2)	N'Doye 49'; Thomas (yellow card) 51'; Pavlović (red card) 77'; Manceau (yellow card) 80'	Report	Valbuena 17', (yellow card) 35'; Gonalons (yellow card) 39'; Fekir 42', (yellow card) 44'	Stadium: Stade Raymond Kopa; Attendance: 14,699; Referee: Antony Gautier

7 May 2017 36	Lyon	3–2	Nantes	Décines-Charpieu
17:00 CEST (UTC+2)	Fekir 65' (pen.); Cornet 70', 80'	Report	Rongier 19'; Diego Carlos (yellow card) 45'; Gillet 75'; Bammou (yellow card) 82'	Stadium: Parc Olympique Lyonnais; Attendance: 34,473; Referee: (France) Mikael Lesage

14 May 2017 37	Montpellier	1–3	Lyon	Montpellier
21:00 CEST (UTC+2)	Mounié 35'; Mukiele (yellow card) 38'; Sessègnon (yellow card) 41'; Sylla (yellow card) 50'	Report	Fekir 17'; Lacazette 22', 90+5'; Depay (yellow card) 38'	Stadium: Stade de la Mosson; Attendance: 13,923; Referee: Frank Letexier

20 May 2017 38	Lyon	3–3	Nice	Décines-Charpieu
21:00 CET (UTC+1)	Le Marchand 10' (o.g.); Lacazette 48', 78'	Report	Seri (yellow card) 12', (goal) 90+4' (pen.); Donis 15', 69'	Stadium: Parc Olympique Lyonnais; Attendance: 50,080; Referee: Jérôme Miguelgorry

=== Coupe de France ===
8 January 2017 Round of 64	Lyon	5–0	Montpellier	Décines-Charpieu
21:00 CEST (UTC+2)	Lacazette 4'; Diakhaby 9'; Fekir 42'; Cornet 70', 75'	Summary	Marveaux (yellow card) 24'; Lasne (yellow card) 45+1'; Hilton (yellow card) 65'	Stadium: Parc Olympique Lyonnais; Attendance: 12,096; Referee: François Letexier

31 January 2017 Round of 32	Marseille	2–1 (a.e.t.)	Lyon	Marseille
21:05 CEST (UTC+2)	Fanni 24', (yellow card) 60'; Sakai (yellow card) 36'; Rolando (yellow card) 73'; Cabella (yellow card) 89'; Dória 109'	Report	Tousart (yellow card) 22'; Rafael (yellow card) 51'; Tolisso 64'; Sergi Darder (yellow card) 81'; Rybus (yellow card) 96'	Stadium: Stade Vélodrome; Attendance: 53,502; Referee: Amaury Delerue

=== Coupe de la Ligue ===
14 December 2016 Round of 16	Lyon	2–2 (a.e.t.) (3–4 p)	Guingamp	Lyon
21:05 CEST (UTC+2)	Valbuena 43'; Lacazette 75'	Summary	Blas 20', (red card) 86'; De Pauw 70'; Lévêque (yellow card) 88'	Stadium: Parc Olympique Lyonnais; Attendance: 17,002; Referee: Benoît Bastien

=== UEFA Champions League ===
==== Group stage ====
Pos	Team	Pld	W	D	L	GF	GA	GD	Pts	Qualification	JUV	SEV	LYO	DZG
1	(Italy) Juventus	6	4	2	0	11	2	+9	14	Advance to knockout phase	—	0–0	1–1	2–0
2	(Spain) Sevilla	6	3	2	1	7	3	+4	11	Advance to knockout phase	1–3	—	1–0	4–0
3	(France) Lyon	6	2	2	2	5	3	+2	8	Transfer to Europa League	0–1	0–0	—	3–0
4	(Croatia) Dinamo Zagreb	6	0	0	6	0	15	−15	0		0–4	0–1	0–1	—

Source: UEFA
Rules for classification: Group stage tiebreakers

14 September 2016 1	Lyon (France)	3–0	(Croatia) Dinamo Zagreb	Décines-Charpieu, France
20:45 CEST (UTC+02:00)	Tolisso 13'; Ferri 49'; Cornet 57'; Rafael (yellow card) 85'	Report	Jonas (yellow card) 4'; Pivarić (yellow card) 26'; Fernándes (yellow card) 41'	Stadium: Parc Olympique Lyonnais; Attendance: 43,754; Referee: Martin Strömbergsson (Sweden)

27 September 2016 2	Sevilla (Spain)	1–0	(France) Lyon	Seville, Spain
20:45 CEST (UTC+02:00)	Ben Yedder 53'; Pareja (yellow card) 56'; Mercado (yellow card) 84'	Report	Gaspar (yellow card) 71'; Gonalons (yellow card) 72'; Cornet (yellow card) 86'	Stadium: Ramón Sánchez Pizjuán; Attendance: 36,741; Referee: Bas Nijhuis (Netherlands)

18 October 2016 3	Lyon (France)	0–1	(Italy) Juventus	Décines-Charpieu, France
20:45 CEST (UTC+02:00)	Rafael (yellow card) 29'; Darder (yellow card) 52'; Lacazette (yellow card) 60'; Diakhaby (yellow card) 73'; Ferri (yellow card) 83'	Report	Bonucci (yellow card) 34'; Lemina (yellow card) 41' (yellow-red card) 54'; Cuadrado 76'	Stadium: Parc Olympique Lyonnais; Attendance: 53,907; Referee: Szymon Marciniak (Poland)

2 November 2016 4	Juventus (Italy)	1–1	(France) Lyon	Turin, Italy
20:45 CET (UTC+01:00)	Higuaín 13' (pen.); Pjanić (yellow card) 38'; Barzagli (yellow card) 58'; Marchisio (yellow card) 84'; Sturaro (yellow card) 89'	Report	Tolisso 85'; Darder (yellow card) 90+1'; Ghezzal (yellow card) 90+4'	Stadium: Juventus Stadium; Attendance: 40,356; Referee: Björn Kuipers (Netherlands)

22 November 2016 5	Dinamo Zagreb (Croatia)	0–1	(France) Lyon	Zagreb, Croatia
20:45 CET (UTC+01:00)	Gojak (yellow card) 36'; Jonas (yellow card) 80'; Knežević (yellow card) 90+1'	Report	Lacazette 72'; Tolisso (yellow card) 81'	Stadium: Stadion Maksimir; Attendance: 7,834; Referee: Pavel Královec (Czech Republic)

7 December 2016 6	Lyon (France)	0–0	(Spain) Sevilla	Décines-Charpieu, France
20:45 CET (UTC+01:00)	Gonalons (yellow card) 38'; Yanga-Mbiwa (yellow card) 53'	Report	Sarabia (yellow card) 32'; Nasri (yellow card) 36'; Mercado (yellow card) 73'	Stadium: Parc Olympique Lyonnais; Attendance: 52,423; Referee: Jonas Eriksson (Sweden)

=== UEFA Europa League ===
==== Knockout phase ====
===== Round of 32 =====
16 February 2017 First leg	AZ (Netherlands)	1–4	(France) Lyon	Alkmaar, Netherlands
CET (UTC+01:00)	Jahanbakhsh (yellow card) 66' (goal) 68' (pen.)	Report	Tousart 26'; Lacazette 45+2', 57'; Ferri 90+5'	Stadium: AFAS Stadion; Attendance: 16,089; Referee: Bobby Madden (Scotland)

23 February 2017 Second leg	Lyon (France)	7–1 (11–2 agg.)	(Netherlands) AZ	Décines-Charpieu, France
CET (UTC+01:00)	Fekir 5', 27', 78'; Cornet 17' (yellow card) 63'; Darder 34'; Jallet (yellow card) 66'; Aouar 87'; Diakhaby 89'	Report	García 26' (yellow card) 45'; Haps (yellow card) 60'	Stadium: Parc Olympique Lyonnais; Attendance: 25,743; Referee: Aleksei Kulbakov (Belarus)

===== Round of 16 =====
9 March 2017 First leg	Lyon (France)	4–2	(Italy) Roma	Décines-Charpieu, France
21:05 CET (UTC+01:00)	Diakhaby 8'; Tolisso 47'; Tousart (yellow card) 62'; Fekir 74'; Lacazette 90+2'	Report	Salah 20'; Fazio 33'; Emerson (yellow card) 41'; Manolas (yellow card) 66'	Stadium: Parc Olympique Lyonnais; Attendance: 50,588; Referee: Anthony Taylor (England)

16 March 2017 Second leg	Roma (Italy)	2–1 (4–5 agg.)	(France) Lyon	Rome, Italy
21:05 CET (UTC+01:00)	Strootman 17' (yellow card) 39'; Manolas (yellow card) 21'; Tousart 60' (o.g.); Nainggolan (yellow card) 62'; Perotti (yellow card) 89'	Report	Diakhaby 16'; Tousart (yellow card) 28'; Mammana (yellow card) 70'; Gonalons (yellow card) 85'; Lopes (yellow card) 86'	Stadium: Stadio Olimpico; Attendance: 19,495; Referee: Viktor Kassai (Hungary)

===== Quarter-final =====
13 April 2017 First leg	Lyon (France)	2–1	(Turkey) Beşiktaş	Décines-Charpieu, France
20:45 CEST (UTC+2)	Rafael (yellow card) 20'; Lacazette (yellow card) 58'; Fekir (yellow card) 67'; Jallet (yellow card) 73'; Valbuena (yellow card) 80'; Tolisso 83'; Morel 85'	Report	Babel 15'; Marcelo (yellow card) 21'; Arslan (yellow card) 83'	Stadium: Parc Olympique Lyonnais; Attendance: 55,452; Referee: Antonio Mateu Lahoz (Spain)

20 April 2017 Second leg	Beşiktaş (Turkey)	2–1 (a.e.t.) (3–3 agg.) (6–7 p)	(France) Lyon	Istanbul, Turkey
20:45 CEST (UTC+2)	Talisca 27', 58'; Adriano (yellow card) 29'; Tošić (yellow card) 78'; Gönül (yellow card) 119'	Report	Gonalons (yellow card) 32'; Lacazette 34'	Stadium: Vodafone Arena; Attendance: 39,623; Referee: Milorad Mazic (Serbia)
	Penalties
	Babel (penalty scored); Tosun (penalty scored); Hutchinson (penalty scored); Arslan (penalty scored); Talisca (penalty scored); Uysal (penalty scored); Tošić (penalty missed); Mitrović (penalty missed)		(penalty scored) Fekir; (penalty scored) Tolisso; (penalty scored) Ghezzal; (penalty scored) Rybus; (penalty scored) Valbuena; (penalty scored) Diakhaby; (penalty missed) Jallet; (penalty scored) Gonalons

===== Semi-final =====
3 May 2017 First leg	Ajax (Netherlands)	4–1	(France) Lyon	Amsterdam, Netherlands
18:45 CET (UTC+01:00)	Traoré 25', 71', (yellow card) 62' de Ligt (yellow card) 30'; Dolberg 34'; Younes 49'	Report	Gonalons (yellow card) 40'; Valbuena 66'	Stadium: Amsterdam Arena; Attendance: 52,141; Referee: (Italy) Gianluca Rocchi

11 May 2017 Second leg	Lyon (France)	3–1 (4–5 agg.)	(Netherlands) Ajax	Décines-Charpieu, France
21:05 CET (UTC+01:00)	Morel (yellow card) 18'; Tolisso (yellow card) 19'; Lacazette 45' (pen.), 45+1'; Diakhaby (yellow card) 49'; Nkoulou (yellow card) 61'; Fekir (yellow card) 61'; Ghezzal 81'	Report	Dolberg 27'; Veltman (yellow card) 49'; Klassen (yellow card) 50'; Viergever (yellow card) 68' (yellow-red card)	Stadium: Parc Olympique Lyonnais; Attendance: 53,810; Referee: (Poland) Szymon Marciniak

== Statistics ==
=== Appearances and goals ===
No.	Pos	Nat	Player	Total		Ligue 1		Coupe de France		Coupe de la Ligue		Trophée des Champions		UEFA Champions League		UEFA Europa League	
No.	Pos	Nat	Player	Apps	Goals	Apps	Goals	Apps	Goals	Apps	Goals	Apps	Goals	Apps	Goals	Apps	Goals
Goalkeepers
1	GK	(Portugal) POR	Anthony Lopes	54	0	37	0	2	0	0	0	1	0	6	0	8	0
16	GK	(France) FRA	Lucas Mocio	0	0	0	0	0	0	0	0	0	0	0	0	0	0
30	GK	(France) FRA	Mathieu Gorgelin	2	0	1	0	0	0	1	0	0	0	0	0	0	0
Defenders
2	DF	(France) FRA	Mapou Yanga-Mbiwa	34	0	24+1	0	1	0	0	0	1	0	5	0	1+1	0
3	DF	(Cameroon) CMR	Nicolas Nkoulou	22	0	13	0	0	0	1	0	1	0	4	0	3	0
4	DF	(Argentina) ARG	Emanuel Mammana	24	1	17	1	1	0	1	0	0	0	1	0	4	0
5	DF	(France) FRA	Mouctar Diakhaby	34	5	22	1	1	1	0	0	0	0	3	0	8	3
13	DF	(France) FRA	Christophe Jallet	22	1	12+1	1	0	0	1	0	0+1	0	0	0	5+2	0
15	DF	(France) FRA	Jérémy Morel	44	1	29	0	2	0	0	0	1	0	6	0	6	1
20	DF	(Brazil) BRA	Rafael	41	0	25+2	0	2	0	0	0	1	0	5	0	4+2	0
23	DF	(France) FRA	Jordy Gaspar	3	0	2	0	0	0	0	0	0	0	1	0	0	0
31	DF	(Poland) POL	Maciej Rybus	28	0	14+5	0	1	0	1	0	0	0	3+1	0	1+2	0
Midfielders
8	MF	(France) FRA	Corentin Tolisso	47	14	29+2	8	1	1	0	0	1	1	5+1	2	7+1	2
11	MF	(Algeria) ALG	Rachid Ghezzal	38	3	15+11	2	1	0	0	0	0	0	2+3	0	3+3	1
12	MF	(France) FRA	Jordan Ferri	36	3	11+17	1	0+1	0	1	0	0+1	0	2+1	1	1+1	1
14	MF	(Spain) ESP	Sergi Darder	35	2	15+8	1	1+1	0	1	0	1	0	5+1	0	2	1
21	MF	(France) FRA	Maxime Gonalons	45	1	29+1	1	1+1	0	0	0	1	0	6	0	6	0
24	MF	(France) FRA	Olivier Kemen	2	0	0+2	0	0	0	0	0	0	0	0	0	0	0
25	MF	(France) FRA	Houssem Aouar	5	1	1+2	0	0	0	0	0	0	0	0	0	0+2	1
28	MF	(France) FRA	Mathieu Valbuena	43	10	15+15	8	2	0	1	1	0+1	0	2+1	0	6	1
29	MF	(France) FRA	Lucas Tousart	33	2	17+5	1	2	0	1	0	0	0	0+1	0	7	1
46	MF	(Luxembourg) LUX	Christopher Martins Pereira	0	0	0	0	0	0	0	0	0	0	0	0	0	0
Forwards
9	FW	(Netherlands) NED	Memphis Depay	18	5	13+4	5	0+1	0	0	0	0	0	0	0	0	0
10	FW	(France) FRA	Alexandre Lacazette	45	37	28+2	28	1	1	0+1	1	1	0	4	1	6+2	6
18	FW	(France) FRA	Nabil Fekir	49	14	28+4	9	1+1	1	1	0	1	0	3+2	0	5+3	4
19	FW	(France) FRA	Jean-Philippe Mateta	3	0	1+1	0	0+1	0	0	0	0	0	0	0	0	0
22	FW	(France) FRA	Gaëtan Perrin	0	0	0	0	0	0	0	0	0	0	0	0	0	0
27	FW	(Ivory Coast) CIV	Maxwel Cornet	51	10	19+14	6	2	2	1	0	1	0	3+3	1	5+3	1
Players transferred out during the season
7	MF	(France) FRA	Clément Grenier	6	0	0+4	0	0	0	0+1	0	0	0	0+1	0	0	0
26	FW	(France) FRA	Aldo Kalulu	6	1	1+3	1	0	0	0	0	0	0	0+2	0	0	0

Last updated: 20 May 2017
Source: Competitions

== Goalscorers ==
As of match played 24 August 2017

Place	Position	Nation	Number	Name	Ligue 1	Coupe de France	Coupe de la Ligue	UEFA Champions League	UEFA Europa League	Total
1	FW	(France)	10	Alexandre Lacazette	28	1	1	1	6	37
2	FW	(France)	18	Nabil Fekir	9	1	0	0	4	14
3	MF	(France)	8	Corentin Tolisso	8	1	0	2	2	13
4	MF	(France)	28	Mathieu Valbuena	8	0	1	0	1	10
4	FW	(Ivory Coast)	27	Maxwel Cornet	6	2	0	1	1	10
6	FW	(Netherlands)	9	Memphis Depay	5	0	0	0	0	5
6	DF	(France)	5	Mouctar Diakhaby	1	1	0	0	3	5
8	MF	(Algeria)	11	Rachid Ghezzal	2	0	0	0	1	3
8	MF	(France)	12	Jordan Ferri	1	0	0	1	1	3
10	MF	(Spain)	14	Sergi Darder	1	0	0	0	1	2
10	MF	(France)	29	Lucas Tousart	1	0	0	0	1	2
12	MF	(France)	21	Maxime Gonalons	1	0	0	0	0	1
12	FW	(France)	26	Aldo Kalulu	1	0	0	0	0	1
12	DF	(Argentina)	4	Emanuel Mammana	1	0	0	0	0	1
12	DF	(France)	13	Christophe Jallet	1	0	0	0	0	1
12	MF	(France)	25	Houssem Aouar	0	0	0	0	1	1
12	DF	(France)	15	Jérémy Morel	0	0	0	0	1	1
				TOTALS	74	6	2	5	23	110

== Kit ==
Kit used in Istanbul.

In the Europa League quarter-final second leg match at Beşiktaş, Lyon wore their previous season away kit above all three of their kits in this season.
