= Bregbo =

- Town, sub-prefecture, and commune
- Location in Ivory Coast
- Coordinates: 5°18′N 3°50′W
- Country: Ivory Coast
- District: Abidjan
- Time zone: UTC+0 (GMT)

Bregbo is a town in south-eastern Ivory Coast. It is a suburb of Abidjan. The town is about 20 kilometres east of Abidjan and lies on the Ébrié Lagoon.
