= 2018–19 OGC Nice season =

Nice
2018–19 season
- Chairman: Jean-Pierre Rivère
- Manager: Patrick Vieira
- Stadium: Allianz Riviera
- Ligue 1: 7th
- Coupe de France: Round of 64
- Coupe de la Ligue: Round of 16
- Top goalscorer: League: Youcef Atal; Allan Saint-Maximin (6 each); All: Youcef Atal; Allan Saint-Maximin (6 each)
- Highest home attendance: League/All: 33,138 (29 September v. PSG)
- Lowest home attendance: League: 14,123 (4 December v. Angers); All: 12,714 (19 December v. Guingamp, CdlL Ro16)
- Average home league attendance: 19,123
- Biggest win: 3–0 (28 April 2019 v. Guingamp)
- Biggest defeat: 0–4 (25 August 2018 v. Dijon) (1 February 2019 at Lille)
Home colours	Away colours	Third colours

The 2018–19 OGC Nice season was the 114th professional season of the club since its creation in 1904.

== Kits ==
Home	Away	Third	Fourth

== Players ==
=== First-team squad ===
French teams are limited to four players without EU citizenship. Hence, the squad list includes only the principal nationality of each player; several non-European players on the squad have dual citizenship with an EU country. Also, players from the ACP countries—countries in Africa, the Caribbean, and the Pacific that are signatories to the Cotonou Agreement—are not counted against non-EU quotas due to the Kolpak ruling.

As of 1 October 2018

Note: Flags indicate national team as defined under FIFA eligibility rules; some limited exceptions apply. Players may hold more than one non-FIFA nationality.

No.	Pos.	Nation	Player
1	GK	TUN	Mouez Hassen
3	DF	FRA	Gautier Lloris
5	DF	FRA	Adrien Tameze
6	MF	FRA	Rémi Walter
7	FW	FRA	Allan Saint-Maximin
8	MF	FRA	Pierre Lees-Melou
9	FW	ITA	Mario Balotelli
10	FW	FRA	Mickaël Le Bihan
11	MF	TUN	Bassem Srarfi
12	DF	SEN	Racine Coly
14	FW	CMR	Ignatius Ganago
15	DF	FRA	Patrick Burner
16	GK	FRA	Yannis Clementia
18	FW	FRA	Ihsan Sacko

No.	Pos.	Nation	Player
20	DF	ALG	Youcef Attal
21	MF	BRA	Danilo Barbosa
23	DF	FRA	Malang Sarr
24	DF	FRA	Christophe Jallet
25	MF	FRA	Wylan Cyprien
26	FW	FRA	Myziane Maolida
27	MF	FRA	Jean-Victor Makengo
28	DF	FRA	Olivier Boscagli
29	DF	FRA	Christophe Hérelle
30	GK	FRA	Yoan Cardinale
31	DF	BRA	Dante (captain)
40	GK	ARG	Walter Benítez
—	FW	FRA	Hicham Mahou

=== Out on loan ===
Note: Flags indicate national team as defined under FIFA eligibility rules; some limited exceptions apply. Players may hold more than one non-FIFA nationality.

No.	Pos.	Nation	Player
—	DF	FRA	Romain Perraud (on loan to Paris FC)
—	MF	FRA	Arnaud Lusamba (on loan to Cercle Brugge)

No.	Pos.	Nation	Player
—	MF	FRA	Vincent Marcel (on loan to Troyes)

== Competitions ==
=== Ligue 1 ===
==== League table ====
Pos	Team	Pld	W	D	L	GF	GA	GD	Pts
5	Marseille	38	18	7	13	60	52	+8	61
6	Montpellier	38	15	14	9	53	42	+11	59
7	Nice	38	15	11	12	30	35	−5	56
8	Reims	38	13	16	9	39	42	−3	55
9	Nîmes	38	15	8	15	57	58	−1	53

Source: Ligue 1 and Soccerway
Rules for classification: 1) Points; 2) Goal difference; 3) Head-to-head points; 4) Head-to-head goal difference; 5) Head-to-head goals scored; 6) Head-to-head away goals scored; 7) Goals scored; 8) Away goals scored; 9) Most goals scored in single league match; 10) Fairplay ranking.

==== Results summary ====
Overall								Home						Away					
Pld	W	D	L	GF	GA	GD	Pts	W	D	L	GF	GA	GD	W	D	L	GF	GA	GD
38	15	11	12	30	35	−5	56	10	4	5	19	14	+5	5	7	7	11	21	−10

Last updated: 24 May 2019.
Source: Competitive matches

==== Results by round ====
Round	1	2	3	4	5	6	7	8	9	10	11	12	13	14	15	16	17	18	19	20	21	22	23	24	25	26	27	28	29	30	31	32	33	34	35	36	37	38
Ground	H	A	H	A	H	A	A	H	A	H	A	H	A	H	A	H	A	H	A	H	A	H	A	H	A	A	H	A	H	A	H	A	H	H	A	H	A	H
Result	L	D	L	W	W	L	W	L	D	L	W	W	W	W	D	D	D	D	L	W	D	W	L	W	L	L	W	L	D	W	W	D	L	W	D	D	L	W
Position	14	14	18	17	11	15	11	13	12	14	10	9	7	7	7	7	7	7	10	6	7	6	7	7	8	10	8	9	9	8	7	8	8	7	7	7	8	7

Source: Results
A = Away; H = Home; W = Win; D = Draw; L = Loss

==== Matches ====
Win Draw Loss

11 August 2018 1	Nice	0–1	Reims	Nice
20:00 CEST (UTC+2)	Cyprien (yellow card) 89'	Report	Doumbia 2', (yellow card) 23'; Cafaro (yellow card) 82'	Stadium: Allianz Riviera; Attendance: 21,372; Referee: Johan Hamel

18 August 2018 2	Caen	1–1	Nice	Caen
20:00 CEST (UTC+2)	Bammou (yellow card) 21', (goal) 52' (pen.); Imorou (yellow card) 80'	Report	Hérelle (yellow card) 51'; Makengo (yellow card) 76'; Ganago 82'	Stadium: Stade Michel d'Ornano; Attendance: 16,132; Referee: Éric Wattellier

25 August 2018 3	Nice	0–4	Dijon	Nice
20:00 CEST (UTC+2)	Saint-Maximin (yellow card) 54'; Le Bihan (yellow card) 88'	Report	Aguerd (yellow card) 6', (goal) 67'; Lautoa (yellow card) 38'; Keita 86', 90+3', (yellow card) 86'	Stadium: Allianz Riviera; Attendance: 17,923; Referee: Willy Delajod

31 August 2018 4	Lyon	0–1	Nice	Décines-Charpieu
20:45 CEST (UTC+2)		Report	Tameze (yellow card) 41'; Balotelli (yellow card) 42'; Saint-Maximin 51'	Stadium: Parc Olympique Lyonnais; Attendance: 53,438; Referee: François Letexier

14 September 2018 5	Nice	2–1	Rennes	Nice
19:00 CEST (UTC+2)	Hérelle (yellow card) 40'; Dante (yellow card) 60'; Attal (yellow card) 74'; Saint-Maximin 77'; Tameze (yellow card) 79'; Lees-Melou 89'	Report	Lea Siliki (yellow card) 45+1'; M. Sarr 58' (o.g.)	Stadium: Allianz Riviera; Attendance: 16,887; Referee: Jérôme Miguelgorry

22 September 2018 6	Montpellier	1–0	Nice	Montpellier
20:00 CEST (UTC+2)	Laborde 35'; Hilton (yellow card) 47'; Sambia (yellow card) 50'; Aguilar (yellow card) 90+1'	Report	Balotelli (yellow card) 53'; Saint-Maximin (yellow card) 90+3'	Stadium: Stade de la Mosson; Attendance: 11,015; Referee: Thomas Leonard

25 September 2018 7	Nantes	1–2	Nice	Nantes
20:00 CEST (UTC+2)	Sala 57'; Miazga (yellow card) 78'	Report	Jallet 31'; Lees-Melou (yellow card) 36'; Coly (yellow card) 52'; Makengo 69'	Stadium: Stade de la Beaujoire; Attendance: 16,604; Referee: Mikael Lesage

29 September 2018 8	Nice	0–3	Paris Saint-Germain	Nice
17:15 CEST (UTC+2)	Cyprien (yellow card) 45+1' (yellow-red card) 59'; Dante (yellow card) 55'	Report	Neymar 22', 90+2'; Nkunku 46'; Mbappé (yellow card) 67'; Bernat (yellow card) 87'	Stadium: Allianz Riviera; Attendance: 33,138; Referee: Clément Turpin

5 October 2018 9	Toulouse	1–1	Nice	Toulouse
20:45 CEST (UTC+2)	Moreira (yellow card) 46'; Dossevi 54'	Report	Srarfi 29'; Tameze (yellow card) 45'; Walter (yellow card) 86'	Stadium: Stadium Municipal; Attendance: 14,162; Referee: Willy Delajod

21 October 2018 10	Nice	0–1	Marseille	Nice
21:00 CEST (UTC+2)	Attal (yellow card) 59'; Dante (yellow card) 84'; Balotelli (yellow card) 87'	Report	Sanson 42'; Radonjić (yellow card) 90+1'	Stadium: Allianz Riviera; Attendance: 30,754; Referee: Amaury Delerue

28 October 2018 11	Bordeaux	0–1	Nice	Bordeaux
17:00 CET (UTC+1)	Sankharé (yellow card) 30'; Cornelius (yellow card) 73'	Report	Cyprien 54'; Balotelli (yellow card) 67'; Benítez (yellow card) 72'; Dante (yellow card) 86'	Stadium: Matmut Atlantique; Attendance: 20,730; Referee: Jérôme Brisard

3 November 2018 12	Nice	1–0	Amiens	Nice
20:00 CET (UTC+1)	Gouano 38' (o.g.); Dante (yellow card) 44'	Report		Stadium: Allianz Riviera; Attendance: 15,259; Referee: Johan Hamel

10 November 2018 13	Nîmes	0–1	Nice	Nîmes
20:00 CET (UTC+1)	Maouassa (yellow card) 14' (yellow-red card) 20'; Landre (red card) 45+2'; Valls (yellow card) 90+2'; Savanier (yellow card) 90+4'	Report	Barbosa (yellow card) 17'; Balotelli (yellow card) 29'; Hérelle (yellow card) 57'; Attal 61'; Jallet (yellow card) 65'; Maolida (yellow card) 73'	Stadium: Stade des Costières; Attendance: 14,290; Referee: Benoît Bastien

25 November 2018 14	Nice	2–0	Lille	Nice
15:00 CET (UTC+1)	Cyprien 25'; Attal (yellow card) 72'; Saint-Maximin 79'	Report	Koné (yellow card) 48'; Xeka (yellow card) 62'; Maia (yellow card) 78'; Çelik (yellow card) 90+1'	Stadium: Allianz Riviera; Attendance: 18,211; Referee: Frank Schneider

1 December 2018 15	Guingamp	0–0	Nice	Guingamp
20:00 CET (UTC+1)	Kerbrat (yellow card) 73'	Report	Boscagli (yellow card) 7'	Stadium: Stade de Roudourou; Attendance: 12,671; Referee: Ruddy Buquet

4 December 2018 16	Nice	0–0	Angers	Nice
19:00 CET (UTC+1)	Hérelle (yellow card) 36'; Tameze (yellow card) 60'; Lees-Melou (yellow card) 90'	Report	Pavlović (yellow card) 8'; Butelle (red card) 90+2'	Stadium: Allianz Riviera; Attendance: 14,123; Referee: Hakim Ben el Hadj

7 December 2018 17	Monaco	Postponed	Nice	Monaco
20:45 CET (UTC+1)		Report		Stadium: Stade Louis II
Note: Match postponed at the request of the government of the Principality of Monaco and in conjunction with the prefecture of Alpes-Maritimes.

16 December 2018 18	Nice	1–1	Saint-Étienne	Nice
17:00 CET (UTC+1)	Attal (yellow card) 45+1'; Hérelle (yellow card) 30' (yellow-red card) 58'; Cyprien 81' (pen.)	Report	Salibur (yellow card) 34' (yellow-red card) 51'; Selnæs (yellow card) 51'; Diony 54'	Stadium: Allianz Riviera; Attendance: 19,250; Referee: Thomas Leonard

22 December 2018 19	Strasbourg	2–0	Nice	Strasbourg
15:00 CET (UTC+1)	Mitrović (yellow card) 3'; Thomasson 26'; Koné 41'; Mothiba (yellow card) 43'	Report		Stadium: Stade de la Meinau; Attendance: 25,113; Referee: Willy Delajod

12 January 2019 20	Nice	1–0	Bordeaux	Nice
20:00 CET (UTC+1)	Saint-Maximin 16' (pen.); Hérelle (yellow card) 22'; Atal (yellow card) 90+4'	Report	Kalu (yellow card) 26'; Bašić (yellow card) 63'; Koundé (yellow card) 78'	Stadium: Allianz Riviera; Attendance: 15,191; Referee: Nicolas Rainville

16 January 2019 17	Monaco	1–1	Nice	Monaco
19:00 CET (UTC+1)	B. Badiashile 50'; Serrano (yellow card) 60'; Falcao (yellow card) 90+5'	Report	Saint-Maximin 30'; Jallet (yellow card) 37'; Sacko (red card) 45+1'; Dante (yellow card) 61'	Stadium: Stade Louis II; Attendance: 11,345; Referee: Benoît Bastien

19 January 2019 21	Reims	1–1	Nice	Reims
20:00 CET (UTC+1)	Oudin 12'	Report	Atal (yellow card) 81'; Tameze (yellow card) 82'; Dante (yellow card) 90+5'; Walter 90+9' (pen.)	Stadium: Stade Auguste Delaune; Attendance: 11,776; Referee: Olivier Thual

26 January 2019 22	Nice	2–0	Nîmes	Nice
20:00 CET (UTC+1)	Ganago (yellow card) 31'; Atal 41'; Saint-Maximin 54'	Report	Landre (yellow card) 53'; Alakouch (yellow card) 88'; Thioub (yellow card) 90+1'	Stadium: Allianz Riviera; Attendance: 15,982; Referee: Benoît Millot

1 February 2019 23	Lille	4–0	Nice	Villeneuve-d'Ascq
20:45 CET (UTC+1)	Leão 8'; Pépé 37'; Koné (yellow card) 43'; Bamba 75'; Xeka (yellow card) 90+1'; Rémy 90+4'	Report	Lees-Melou (red card) 89'	Stadium: Stade Pierre-Mauroy; Attendance: 32,849; Referee: Jérôme Miguelgorry

10 February 2019 24	Nice	1–0	Lyon	Nice
21:00 CET (UTC+1)	Maolida (yellow card) 48'; Dante (yellow card) 49'; Walter 69' (pen.)	Report	Fekir (yellow card) 9'; Marcelo (yellow card) 86'	Stadium: Allianz Riviera; Attendance: 22,193; Referee: Mikael Lesage

16 February 2019 25	Angers	3–0	Nice	Angers
20:00 CET (UTC+1)	Bahoken 44' (pen.); Fulgini 47'; Cristian 90+2'	Report	Jallet (yellow card) 43'; Burner (yellow card) 72'	Stadium: Stade Raymond Kopa; Attendance: 11,117; Referee: Frank Schneider

23 February 2019 26	Amiens	1–0	Nice	Amiens
20:00 CET (UTC+1)	Guirassy 11'	Report	Sarr (yellow card) 22'; Makengo (yellow card) 53'	Stadium: Stade de la Licorne; Attendance: 11,074; Referee: Thomas Leonard

3 March 2019 27	Nice	1–0	Strasbourg	Nice
15:00 CET (UTC+1)	Atal 20'; Danilo (red card) 89'	Report	Grandsir (red card) 89'	Stadium: Allianz Riviera; Attendance: 17,479; Referee: Eric Wattellier

10 March 2019 28	Marseille	1–0	Nice	Marseille
21:00 CET (UTC+1)	Ocampos (yellow card) 58'; Balotelli 61'; Kamara (yellow card) 69'	Report	Hérelle (yellow card) 90'	Stadium: Stade Vélodrome; Attendance: 50,935; Referee: Benoît Bastien

15 March 2019 29	Nice	1–1	Toulouse	Nice
19:00 CET (UTC+1)	Cyprien 20'	Report	Sylla (yellow card) 24'; Gradel (yellow card) 61'; Mubele 88'	Stadium: Allianz Riviera; Attendance: 14,402; Referee: Olivier Thual

31 March 2019 30	Dijon	0–1	Nice	Dijon
15:00 CEST (UTC+2)	Sammaritano (yellow card) 29' (yellow-red card) 54'; Marié (yellow card) 39'	Report	Lees-Melou 60'; Burner (yellow card) 64'	Stadium: Stade Gaston Gérard; Attendance: 12,345; Referee: Nicolas Rainville

7 April 2019 31	Nice	1–0	Montpellier	Nice
17:00 CEST (UTC+2)	Dante 20'; Srarfi (yellow card) 83'	Report	Hilton (yellow card) 34'	Stadium: Allianz Riviera; Attendance: 17,980; Referee: Ruddy Buquet

14 April 2019 32	Rennes	0–0	Nice	Rennes
15:00 CEST (UTC+2)	Traoré (yellow card) 43'; Mexer (yellow card) 61'	Report	Lees-Melou (yellow card) 51'	Stadium: Roazhon Park; Attendance: 23,706; Referee: Mikael Lesage

20 April 2019 33	Nice	0–1	Caen	Nice
20:00 CEST (UTC+2)	Lees-Melou (yellow card) 16'; Dante (yellow card) 87'	Report	Djiku (yellow card) 26', (goal) 74'; Ninga (yellow card) 60'; Armougom (yellow card) 85'	Stadium: Allianz Riviera; Attendance: 17,092; Referee: Jérôme Miguelgorry

28 April 2019 34	Nice	3–0	Guingamp	Nice
15:00 CEST (UTC+2)	Atal 9', 68', 73'; Dante (yellow card) 16'; Hérelle (yellow card) 37'; Tameze (yellow card) 38'; Burner (yellow card) 72'	Report	Merghem (yellow card) 19'; Mendy (yellow card) 70'; Didot (yellow card) 78'	Stadium: Allianz Riviera; Attendance: 16,379; Referee: Hakim Ben El Hadj

4 May 2019 35	Paris Saint-Germain	1–1	Nice	Paris
17:00 CEST (UTC+2)	Verratti (yellow card) 54'; Neymar 60' (pen.); Cavani (penalty missed) 90+3’ (yellow card) 90+6'	Report	Ganago 46'; Atal (yellow card) 69'; Dante (yellow card) 89'; Hérelle (yellow card) 90+6'	Stadium: Parc des Princes; Attendance: 47,283; Referee: Frank Schneider

11 May 2019 36	Nice	1–1	Nantes	Nice
20:00 CEST (UTC+2)	Sarr 56'; Atal (yellow card) 81'; Srarfi (yellow card) 86'	Report	Moutoussamy 29'; Fábio (yellow card) 49'; Girotto (yellow card) 62'; Traoré (yellow card) 78'	Stadium: Allianz Riviera; Attendance: 16,372; Referee: Stéphanie Frappart

18 May 2019 37	Saint-Étienne	3–0	Nice	Saint-Étienne
21:00 CEST (UTC+2)	Berić 26', 65'; Hamouma 81'	Report	Coly (yellow card) 62'; Lees-Melou (yellow card) 73'; Le Bihan (yellow card) 86'	Stadium: Stade Geoffroy-Guichard; Attendance: 36,759; Referee: Antony Gautier

24 May 2019 38	Nice	2–0	Monaco	Nice
21:05 CEST (UTC+2)	B. Badiashile 36' (o.g.); Tameze (yellow card) 44'; Le Bihan 67' (pen.); Makengo (yellow card) 84'	Report	Henrichs (yellow card) 12'; Golovin (yellow card) 21'; Glik (yellow card) 66'	Stadium: Allianz Riviera; Attendance: 23,356; Referee: Ruddy Buquet

=== Coupe de France ===
6 January 2019 Round of 64	Toulouse	4–1	Nice	Toulouse
17:15 CET (UTC+1)	Diakité 40'; Gradel 45', (yellow card) 71'; Dossevi 68'; García (yellow card) 59', (goal) 85'; Sylla (yellow card) 75'	Report	Sacko 48'; Jallet (yellow card) 71'; Sarr (yellow card) 82'	Stadium: Stadium Municipal; Attendance: 7,979; Referee: Amaury Delerue

=== Coupe de la Ligue ===
31 October 2018 Round of 32	Nice	3–2	Auxerre	Nice
18:45 CET (UTC+1)	Maolida 16'; Walter 41', 80' (pen.)	Report	Ba (yellow card) 22'; Dugimont 29'; Philippoteaux 82'; Marcelin (red card) 87'; Adéoti (yellow card) 90+4'	Stadium: Allianz Riviera; Attendance: 15,701; Referee: Bartolomeu Varela

19 December 2018 Round of 16	Nice	0–0 (1–3 p)	Guingamp	Nice
21:05 CET (UTC+1)	Dante (yellow card) 24'; Barbosa (yellow card) 67'	Report	Fofana (yellow card) 33'; Tabanou (yellow card) 73'	Stadium: Allianz Riviera; Attendance: 12,714; Referee: Mikael Lesage
	Penalties
	Lees-Melou (penalty missed); Dante (penalty missed); Walter (penalty scored); Jallet (penalty missed)		(penalty scored) Mendy; (penalty scored) Eboa Eboa; (penalty scored) Ngbakoto

== Statistics ==
=== Appearances and goals ===
No.	Pos	Nat	Player	Total		Ligue 1		Coupe de France		Coupe de la Ligue	
No.	Pos	Nat	Player	Apps	Goals	Apps	Goals	Apps	Goals	Apps	Goals
Goalkeepers
1	GK	(Tunisia) TUN	Mouez Hassen	0	0	0	0	0	0	0	0
16	GK	(France) FRA	Yannis Clementia	0	0	0	0	0	0	0	0
30	GK	(France) FRA	Yoan Cardinale	3	0	3	0	0	0	0	0
40	GK	(Argentina) ARG	Walter Benítez	38	0	35	0	1	0	2	0
Defenders
3	DF	(France) FRA	Gautier Lloris	0	0	0	0	0	0	0	0
5	DF	(France) FRA	Adrien Tameze	40	0	34+3	0	1	0	2	0
12	DF	(Senegal) SEN	Racine Coly	11	0	6+3	0	0	0	2	0
15	DF	(France) FRA	Patrick Burner	20	0	15+2	0	1	0	2	0
20	DF	(Algeria) ALG	Youcef Attal	30	6	25+4	6	0	0	0+1	0
23	DF	(France) FRA	Malang Sarr	38	1	34+1	1	1	0	2	0
24	DF	(France) FRA	Christophe Jallet	17	1	11+3	1	1	0	2	0
28	DF	(France) FRA	Olivier Boscagli	16	0	10+4	0	1	0	1	0
29	DF	(France) FRA	Christophe Hérelle	34	0	33	0	1	0	0	0
31	DF	(Brazil) BRA	Dante	37	1	36	1	0	0	1	0
32	DF	(France) FRA	Andy Pelmard	2	0	2	0	0	0	0	0
Midfielders
6	MF	(France) FRA	Rémi Walter	22	4	8+11	2	1	0	2	2
8	MF	(France) FRA	Pierre Lees-Melou	31	2	26+4	2	0	0	1	0
11	MF	(Tunisia) TUN	Bassem Srarfi	25	1	8+14	1	0+1	0	1+1	0
21	MF	(Brazil) BRA	Danilo Barbosa	24	0	18+4	0	0	0	1+1	0
25	MF	(France) FRA	Wylan Cyprien	30	4	27+2	4	1	0	0	0
27	MF	(France) FRA	Jean-Victor Makengo	27	1	11+14	1	0+1	0	0+1	0
34	MF	(France) FRA	Eddy Sylvestre	6	0	3+2	0	1	0	0	0
37	MF	(Portugal) POR	Pedro Brazão	1	0	0+1	0	0	0	0	0
Forwards
7	FW	(France) FRA	Allan Saint-Maximin	36	6	34	6	0	0	2	0
10	FW	(France) FRA	Mickaël Le Bihan	5	1	2+3	1	0	0	0	0
14	FW	(Cameroon) CMR	Ignatius Ganago	22	2	9+11	2	1	0	0+1	0
18	FW	(France) FRA	Ihsan Sacko	14	1	4+9	0	0+1	1	0	0
26	FW	(France) FRA	Myziane Maolida	15	1	10+4	0	0	0	1	1
33	FW	(France) FRA	Hicham Mahou	1	0	0	0	0	0	0+1	0
35	FW	(Tunisia) TUN	Assil Jaziri	3	0	0+3	0	0	0	0	0
38	FW	(France) FRA	Mohamed Lamine Diaby	6	0	2+4	0	0	0	0	0
Players transferred out during the season
9	FW	(Italy) ITA	Mario Balotelli	10	0	9+1	0	0	0	0	0

Last updated: 24 May 2019
Source: Competitions
