= 2017–18 OGC Nice season =

Nice
2017–18 season
- Chairman: Jean-Pierre Rivère
- Manager: Lucien Favre
- Stadium: Allianz Riviera
- Ligue 1: 8th
- Coupe de France: Round of 64
- Coupe de la Ligue: Quarter-finals
- UEFA Champions League: Play-off round
- UEFA Europa League: Round of 32
- Top goalscorer: League: Mario Balotelli (18); All: Mario Balotelli (26)
Home colours	Away colours	Third colours

The 2017–18 OGC Nice season was the 113th professional season of the club since its creation in 1904.

== Players ==
=== Squad information ===
Players and squad numbers last updated on 1 September 2017.
Note: Flags indicate national team as has been defined under FIFA eligibility rules. Players may hold more than one non-FIFA nationality.

No.	Name	Nat.	Position(s)	Date of Birth (Age)	Signed in	Contract until	Signed from
Goalkeepers
16	Simon Pouplin	(France)	GK	28 May 1985 (age 41)	2014	2018	(France) Sochaux
30	Yoan Cardinale	(France)	GK	27 March 1994 (age 32)	2015	2018	Youth academy
40	Walter Benítez	(Argentina)	GK	19 March 1993 (age 33)	2016		(Argentina) Quilmes
Defenders
2	Arnaud Souquet	(France)	RB	12 February 1992 (age 34)	2016	2020	(France) Dijon
3	Gautier Lloris	(France)	CB	18 July 1995 (age 31)	2016	2018	Youth academy
4	Marlon Santos	(Brazil)	CB	7 September 1995 (age 31)	2017	2019	(Spain) Barcelona
12	Racine Coly	(Senegal)	CB / LB	8 December 1995 (age 30)	2017		(Italy) Brescia
15	Patrick Burner	(France)	RB / LB	11 April 1996 (age 30)	2016	2019	Youth academy
20	Maxime Le Marchand	(France)	CB / LB	11 October 1989 (age 37)	2015	2018	(France) Le Havre
23	Malang Sarr	(France)	CB	23 January 1999 (age 27)	2016	2021	Youth academy
24	Christophe Jallet	(France)	RB	31 October 1983 (age 43)	2017		(France) Lyon
31	Dante	(Brazil)	CB / LB	18 April 1983 (age 43)	2016	2019	(Germany) Wolfsburg
34	Romain Perraud	(France)	DF	22 September 1997 (age 29)	2016		Youth academy
Midfielders
5	Adrien Tameze	(France)	AM	4 February 1994 (age 32)	2017	2021	(France) Valenciennes
7	Allan Saint-Maximin	(France)	LW	12 March 1997 (age 29)	2017	2020	(France) Monaco
8	Pierre Lees-Melou	(France)	AM	25 May 1993 (age 33)	2017	2021	(France) Dijon
10	Wesley Sneijder	(Netherlands)	AM	9 June 1984 (age 42)	2017		(Turkey) Galatasaray
18	Rémi Walter	(France)	DM	26 April 1995 (age 31)	2016	2019	(France) Nancy
19	Vincent Marcel	(France)	MF	9 April 1997 (age 29)	2015	2021	Youth academy
21	Nampalys Mendy	(France)	DM	23 June 1992 (age 34)	2017	2018	(England) Leicester City
22	Arnaud Lusamba	(France)	AM	4 January 1997 (age 29)	2016	2021	(France) Nancy
25	Wylan Cyprien	(France)	CM	28 January 1995 (age 31)	2016	2021	(France) Lens
26	Vincent Koziello	(France)	CM	28 October 1995 (age 31)	2014	2019	Youth academy
33	Albert Rafetraniaina	(France)	DM	9 September 1996 (age 30)	2012	2018	Youth academy
Forwards
9	Mario Balotelli	(Italy)	ST	12 August 1990 (age 36)	2016	2018	(England) Liverpool
11	Bassem Srarfi	(Tunisia)	CM	25 June 1997 (age 29)	2017	2021	(Tunisia) Club Africain
14	Alassane Pléa	(France)	CF / RW	10 March 1993 (age 33)	2014	2021	(France) Lyon
27	Jean-Victor Makengo	(France)	CM	12 June 1998 (age 28)	2017		(France) Caen
29	Mickaël Le Bihan	(France)	CF	16 May 1990 (age 36)	2015	2019	(France) Le Havre
36	Mohamed Lamine Diaby	(France)	CF	19 January 2001 (age 25)	2017		Youth academy
37	Ignatius Ganago	(Cameroon)	CF	16 February 1999 (age 27)	2017		Youth academy
39	Hicham Mahou	(France)	FW	2 July 1999 (age 27)	2017		Youth academy

== Competitions ==
=== Overall ===
Competition	Started round	Final position	First match	Last match
Ligue 1	Matchday 1	8th	5 August 2017	19 May 2018
Coupe de France	Round of 64		6 January 2018	
Coupe de la Ligue	Round of 16	Quarter-finals	13 December 2017	9 January 2018
UEFA Champions League	Third qualifying round	Play-off round	26 July 2017	22 August 2017
UEFA Europa League	Group stage	Round of 32	14 September 2017	22 February 2018

=== Ligue 1 ===
==== League table ====
Pos	Team	Pld	W	D	L	GF	GA	GD	Pts	Qualification or relegation
6	Bordeaux	38	16	7	15	53	48	+5	55	Qualification for the Europa League second qualifying round (Note: Since the winners of the 2017–18 Coupe de France and the 2017–18 Coupe de la Ligue, Paris Saint-Germain, qualified for European competition based on league position, the spot awarded to the Coupe de France winners (Europa League group stage) was passed to the fourth-placed team and the spot awarded to the Coupe de la Ligue winners (Europa League third qualifying round) was passed to the sixth-placed team. The fifth-placed team received the spot in Europa League third qualifying round originally designated to the fourth-placed team.)
7	Saint-Étienne	38	15	10	13	47	50	−3	55	
8	Nice	38	15	9	14	53	52	+1	54	
9	Nantes	38	14	10	14	36	41	−5	52	
10	Montpellier	38	11	18	9	36	33	+3	51	

Source: Ligue 1 and Soccerway
Rules for classification: 1) Points; 2) Goal difference; 3) Head-to-head points; 4) Head-to-head goal difference; 5) Head-to-head goals scored; 6) Head-to-head away goals; 7) Goals scored; 8) Away goals scored; 9) Most goals scored in one league match; 10) Fair-play points

==== Results summary ====
Overall								Home						Away					
Pld	W	D	L	GF	GA	GD	Pts	W	D	L	GF	GA	GD	W	D	L	GF	GA	GD
38	15	9	14	53	52	+1	54	10	3	6	29	23	+6	5	6	8	24	29	−5

Last updated: 19 May 2018.
Source: Competitive matches

==== Results by round ====
Round	1	2	3	4	5	6	7	8	9	10	11	12	13	14	15	16	17	18	19	20	21	22	23	24	25	26	27	28	29	30	31	32	33	34	35	36	37	38
Ground	A	H	H	A	H	A	H	H	A	H	A	H	A	H	A	H	A	H	A	H	A	H	A	H	A	H	A	H	A	H	A	H	A	H	A	A	H	A
Result	L	L	W	L	W	W	D	L	L	L	L	W	D	L	W	W	W	W	D	W	D	W	L	L	L	D	D	W	W	L	W	D	D	W	D	L	W	L
Position	14	15	11	17	11	8	9	10	14	15	17	16	17	18	14	13	8	6	6	6	6	6	6	7	9	9	9	8	7	8	7	7	6	5	7	7	6	8

Source: Competitive matches
A = Away; H = Home; W = Win; D = Draw; L = Loss

==== Matches ====
5 August 2017 1	Saint-Étienne	1–0	Nice	Saint-Étienne
20:00	Bamba 4'; Théophile-Catherine (yellow card) 12'; Selnæs (yellow card) 66'	Report	Dante (yellow card) 70'	Stadium: Stade Geoffroy-Guichard; Attendance: 25,879; Referee: François Letexier

11 August 2017 2	Nice	1–2	Troyes	Nice
19:00	Pléa 63' (pen.); Koziello (yellow card) 64'; Dante (yellow card) 90'	Report	Niane 53'; Samassa (yellow card) 62'; Vizcarrondo (yellow card) 62'; Hérelle (yellow card) 77'; Khaoui 85'	Stadium: Allianz Riviera; Attendance: 24,260; Referee: Jérôme Miguelgorry

19 August 2017 3	Nice	2–0	Guingamp	Nice
20:00	Pléa 45'; Walter 47'; Dante (yellow card) 74'; Jallet (yellow card) 83'	Report	Didot (yellow card) 68'	Stadium: Allianz Riviera; Attendance: 21,070; Referee: Benoît Millot

26 August 2017 4	Amiens	3–0	Nice	Amiens
20:00	Kakuta 14'; Konaté 28', 88'; Ielsch (yellow card) 42'; Monconduit (yellow card) 57'; Dibassy (yellow card) 90+2'	Report	Pléa (yellow card) 48'; Cardinale (yellow card) 54'; Sarr (yellow card) 67'	Stadium: Stade de la Licorne; Attendance: 9,397; Referee: Johan Hamel

9 September 2017 5	Nice	4–0	Monaco	Nice
17:00	Balotelli 6' (pen.), 60', (yellow card) 69'; Jallet (yellow card) 11'; Pléa 18'; Ganago 85'	Report	Sidibé (yellow card) 5'; Jorge (yellow card) 14'	Stadium: Allianz Riviera; Attendance: 28,995; Referee: Clément Turpin

17 September 2017 6	Rennes	0–1	Nice	Rennes
17:00	Prcić (yellow card) 35'	Report	Saint-Maximin (yellow card) 45+2'; Jallet (yellow card) 49'; Seri (yellow card) 69'; Balotelli 79'; Lees-Melou (yellow card) 85'; Souquet (yellow card) 90+3'	Stadium: Roazhon Park; Attendance: 24,892; Referee: Nicolas Rainville

22 September 2017 7	Nice	2–2	Angers	Nice
19:00	Balotelli 39' (pen.), (yellow card) 62'; Le Marchand (yellow card) 47'; Cardinale (yellow card) 72'; Traoré 76' (o.g.); Dante (yellow card) 90+1'	Report	Pavlović 13', (yellow card) 75'; Toko Ekambi 34'; Tahrat (yellow card) 40'	Stadium: Allianz Riviera; Attendance: 18,023; Referee: François Letexier

1 October 2017 8	Nice	2–4	Marseille	Nice
21:00	Balotelli 4'; Seri 16'; Lees-Melou (yellow card) 32'; Pléa (yellow card) 50'	Report	Ocampos 26', 44', (yellow card) 88'; Payet (yellow card) 36'; Lees-Melou 41' (o.g.); Luiz Gustavo 48', (red card) 66'; Amavi (yellow card) 61'	Stadium: Allianz Riviera; Attendance: 32,702; Referee: Benoît Bastien

15 October 2017 9	Montpellier	2–0	Nice	Montpellier
17:00	Sessègnon 55'; Roussillon (yellow card) 61'; Mbenza 74', (yellow card) 76'; Hilton (yellow card) 87'	Report	Dante (yellow card) 33'	Stadium: Stade de la Mosson; Attendance: 14,374; Referee: Jérôme Brisard

22 October 2017 10	Nice	1–2	Strasbourg	Nice
15:00	Lees-Melou 54' (pen.)	Report	Da Costa 23', 49'; Seka (red card) 53'; Liénard (yellow card) 58'	Stadium: Allianz Riviera; Attendance: 23,595; Referee: Nicolas Rainville

27 October 2017 11	Paris Saint-Germain	3–0	Nice	Paris
20:45	Cavani 3', 31'; Dante 52' (o.g.)	Report		Stadium: Parc des Princes; Attendance: 47,224; Referee: Tony Chapron

5 November 2017 12	Nice	1–0	Dijon	Nice
15:00	Balotelli 40' (pen.), (red card) 89'; Koziello (yellow card) 47'	Report	Xeka (yellow card) 66'	Stadium: Allianz Riviera; Attendance: 18,987; Referee: Olivier Thual

19 November 2017 13	Caen	1–1	Nice	Caen
15:00	Sankoh (yellow card) 25'; Djiku (yellow card) 81'; Rodelin 90+2'	Report	Lees-Melou 40'; Tameze (yellow card) 55'; Benítez (yellow card) 75'; Pléa (yellow card) 78'	Stadium: Stade Michel d'Ornano; Attendance: 15,144; Referee: Sébastien Desiage

26 November 2017 14	Nice	0–5	Lyon	Nice
15:00	Marlon (yellow card) 12' (yellow-red card) 70'; Seri (yellow card) 22'; Dante (yellow card) 61'; Mendy (yellow card) 74'	Report	Depay 5', 38'; Cornet 20', (yellow card) 22'; Mariano 27'; Marcelo (yellow card) 35'; Maolida 79'; Ferri (yellow card) 86'	Stadium: Allianz Riviera; Attendance: 27,542; Referee: Frank Schneider

29 November 2017 15	Toulouse	1–2	Nice	Toulouse
19:00	Delort 3'; Moubandje (yellow card) 29'; Cahuzac (yellow card) 75'; Amian (red card) 79'; Gradel (yellow card) 90'	Report	Dante (yellow card) 37' (yellow-red card) 40'; Le Marchand (yellow card) 48'; Jallet (yellow card) 58'; Balotelli 80' (pen.); Srarfi 90+1'	Stadium: Stadium Municipal; Attendance: 10,336; Referee: Johan Hamel

2 December 2017 16	Nice	3–1	Metz	Nice
20:00	Pléa 27'; Balotelli 56'; Saint-Maximin 71'	Report	Roux 29'; Balliu (yellow card) 38'; Nguette (yellow card) 76'	Stadium: Allianz Riviera; Attendance: 16,383; Referee: Mikael Lesage

10 December 2017 17	Nantes	1–2	Nice	Nantes
17:00	Bammou 12'; Diego Carlos (yellow card) 67'	Report	Lees-Melou (yellow card) 21'; Tameze (yellow card) 37'; Balotelli (yellow card) 40', (goal) 75'; Pléa 42'; Souquet (yellow card) 85'	Stadium: Stade de la Beaujoire; Attendance: 19,723; Referee: Jérôme Miguelgorry

17 December 2017 18	Nice	1–0	Bordeaux	Nice
17:00	Balotelli 36', (yellow card) 42'	Report	Poundjé (yellow card) 80'; Jovanović (yellow card) 82'	Stadium: Allianz Riviera; Attendance: 22,831; Referee: Ruddy Buquet

20 December 2017 19	Lille	1–1	Nice	Lille
20:50	Thiago Maia (yellow card) 19'; Ié (yellow card) 44'; El Ghazi 68'	Report	Srarfi 38', (yellow card) 61'; Marlon (yellow card) 54'; Mendy (yellow card) 80'; Koziello (yellow card) 90+3'	Stadium: Stade Pierre-Mauroy; Attendance: 26,450; Referee: Frank Schneider

13 January 2018 20	Nice	1–0	Amiens	Nice
20:00	Burner (yellow card) 37'; Lees-Melou 66'	Report		Stadium: Allianz Riviera; Attendance: 17,340; Referee: Amaury Delerue

16 January 2018 21	Monaco	2–2	Nice	Monaco
21:00	Glik (yellow card) 18'; Diakhaby 33', (yellow card) 75'; Keita (yellow card) 53'; Moutinho (yellow card) 63'; Falcao 90+2'	Report	Cyprien (yellow card) 34'; Balotelli 47', 68', (yellow card) 61'; Le Marchand (yellow card) 57'	Stadium: Stade Louis II; Attendance: 10,533; Referee: François Letexier

21 January 2018 22	Nice	1–0	Saint-Étienne	Nice
15:00	Cyprien 23'; Seri (yellow card) 59'; Balotelli (yellow card) 70'	Report	Dioussé (yellow card) 73'	Stadium: Allianz Riviera; Attendance: 23,254; Referee: Frank Schneider

27 January 2018 23	Metz	2–1	Nice	Metz
20:00	Diagne (yellow card) 33'; Roux 50', 62', (yellow card) 51'; Niakhate (yellow card) 57'; Cohade (yellow card) 67'	Report	Seri (yellow card) 15'; Burner (yellow card) 31'; Lees-Melou (red card) 38'; Balotelli (yellow card) 45+2', (goal) 58'; Dante (yellow card) 79'; Ganago (yellow card) 87'	Stadium: Stade Saint-Symphorien; Attendance: 13,200; Referee: Johan Hamel

3 February 2018 24	Nice	0–1	Toulouse	Nice
20:00	Coly (yellow card) 52'; Tameze (yellow card) 59'	Report	Sanogo (yellow card) 21'; Michelin (yellow card) 61'; Gradel 67'	Stadium: Allianz Riviera; Attendance: 17,231; Referee: Antony Gautier

10 February 2018 25	Dijon	3–2	Nice	Dijon
20:00	Djilobodji (yellow card) 33'; Tavares 61', 78' (pen.); Amalfitano (yellow card) 80'; Kwon Chang-hoon 84'	Report	Dante (yellow card) 42'; Lees-Melou 65'; Pléa 67'; Balotelli (yellow card) 74'; Marlon (yellow card) 80'	Stadium: Stade Gaston Gérard; Attendance: 11,901; Referee: Nicolas Rainville

18 February 2018 26	Nice	1–1	Nantes	Nice
15:00	Dante 6'; Pléa (yellow card) 63'; Lees-Melou (yellow card) 77'	Report	Sala 26' (pen.)	Stadium: Allianz Riviera; Attendance: 20,966; Referee: Clément Turpin

25 February 2018 27	Bordeaux	0–0	Nice	Bordeaux
15:00	Vada (yellow card) 78'; Pablo (yellow card) 78'	Report	Coly (yellow card) 26'; Makengo (yellow card) 38'	Stadium: Nouveau Stade de Bordeaux; Attendance: 23,027; Referee: Frank Schneider

2 March 2018 28	Nice	2–1	Lille	Nice
19:00	Balotelli 5'; Marlon (yellow card) 21'; Cyprien (yellow card) 28', (goal) 80'; Coly (yellow card) 73'	Report	Mothiba (yellow card) 35'; Luiz Araújo 51'	Stadium: Allianz Riviera; Attendance: 20,314; Referee: Thomas Léonard

11 March 2018 29	Guingamp	2–5	Nice	Guingamp
15:00	Grenier 9' (pen.); Briand (yellow card) 40'; Tabanou (yellow card) 61'; Martins Pereira (yellow card) 75'; Marlon 83' (o.g.)	Report	Pléa 24', 47', 58', 90+2'; Sacko (yellow card) 28'; Srarfi 86'	Stadium: Stade de Roudourou; Attendance: 13,656; Referee: Stéphane Jochem

18 March 2018 30	Nice	1–2	Paris Saint-Germain	Nice
13:00	Saint-Maximin 17'	Report	Di María 21'; Verratti (yellow card) 74'; Dani Alves 82'	Stadium: Allianz Riviera; Attendance: 33,478; Referee: François Letexier

1 April 2018 31	Troyes	0–2	Nice	Troyes
17:00	Deplagne (yellow card) 29'	Report	Pléa 16', 83'	Stadium: Stade de l'Aube; Attendance: 11,013; Referee: Johan Hamel

8 April 2018 32	Nice	1–1	Rennes	Nice
15:00	Pléa 17'; Souquet (yellow card) 37'; Lees-Melou (yellow card) 69'; Le Marchand (yellow card) 78'; Dante (yellow card) 90+5'	Report	Gelin (yellow card) 9'; Bourigeaud 27'; Khazri (yellow card) 45'; Sarr (yellow card) 82'; André (yellow card) 90+3'	Stadium: Allianz Riviera; Attendance: 23,827; Referee: Jérôme Brisard

13 April 2018 33	Angers	1–1	Nice	Angers
20:45	Fulgini 84'; Guillaume (yellow card) 90+1'	Report	Lees-Melou (yellow card) 38'; Pléa 68', (yellow card) 86'; Benítez (yellow card) 77'	Stadium: Stade Raymond Kopa; Attendance: 12,754; Referee: Clément Turpin

22 April 2018 34	Nice	1–0	Montpellier	Nice
15:00	Lees-Melou 59'	Report		Stadium: Allianz Riviera; Attendance: 21,285; Referee: Ruddy Buquet

28 April 2018 35	Strasbourg	1–1	Nice	Strasbourg
20:00	Saadi 21'; Liénard (yellow card) 60'; Seka (yellow card) 64'	Report	Marlon (yellow card) 29'; Balotelli 59' (pen.), (yellow card) 60'; Souquet (yellow card) 76'; Seri (yellow card) 79'	Stadium: Stade de la Meinau; Attendance: 25,386; Referee: Amaury Delerue

6 May 2018 36	Marseille	2–1	Nice	Marseille
17:00	Germain 13'; Kamara (yellow card) 39'; Payet 72'	Report	Balotelli 5', (yellow card) 40'	Stadium: Stade Vélodrome; Attendance: 55,305; Referee: Antony Gautier

12 May 2018 37	Nice	4–1	Caen	Nice
21:00	Balotelli 3', 11' (pen.); Saint-Maximin 36'; Seri 72'	Report	Guilbert (yellow card) 35'; Diomandé (red card) 54'; Kouakou 76'	Stadium: Allianz Riviera; Attendance: 22,570; Referee: Frank Schneider

19 May 2018 38	Lyon	3–2	Nice	Décines-Charpieu
21:00	Morel (yellow card) 40'; Depay 48', 65', 86'; Rafael (yellow card) 70'; Ferri (yellow card) 71'	Report	Pléa 18', 89', (yellow card) 70'; Balotelli (yellow card) 20'; Benítez (yellow card) 53'	Stadium: Parc Olympique Lyonnais; Attendance: 56,953; Referee: Benoît Bastien

=== Coupe de France ===
6 January 2018 Round of 64	Toulouse	1–0	Nice	Toulouse
14:15	Somália 51'	Report	Tameze (yellow card) 65'; Dante (yellow card) 82'	Stadium: Stadium Municipal; Attendance: 8,318; Referee: Jérôme Brisard

=== Coupe de la Ligue ===
13 December 2017 Round of 16	Lille	1–1 (2–3 p)	Nice	Villeneuve-d'Ascq
21:05	Luiz Araújo 7', (yellow card) 46'	Report	Marlon (yellow card) 27'; Balotelli 58'	Stadium: Stade Pierre-Mauroy; Attendance: 9,651; Referee: Stéphane Jochem
	Penalties
	Luiz Araújo (penalty missed); Alonso (penalty missed); Mendes (penalty scored); El Ghazi (penalty scored); Bissouma (penalty missed)		(penalty scored) Lees-Melou; (penalty missed) Cyprien; (penalty scored) Pléa; (penalty scored) Seri

9 January 2018 Quarter-finals	Nice	1–2	Monaco	Nice
21:00	Burner (yellow card) 12'; Pléa 18'	Report	Lemar 3'; Diakhaby 37', (yellow card) 45'; Lopes (yellow card) 80'	Stadium: Allianz Riviera; Attendance: 19,686; Referee: Clément Turpin

=== UEFA Champions League ===
==== Third qualifying round ====
26 July 2017 First leg	Nice (France)	1–1	(Netherlands) Ajax	Nice, France
20:45 CEST (UTC+02:00)	Balotelli (yellow card) 30', (goal) 32'; Eysseric (yellow card) 41'	Report	Van de Beek 49', (yellow card) 78'; De Ligt (yellow card) 66'; Schöne (yellow card) 69'; Sánchez (yellow card) 78'; Veltman (yellow card) 90+1'	Stadium: Allianz Riviera; Attendance: 31,342; Referee: Carlos del Cerro Grande (Spain)

2 August 2017 Second leg	Ajax (Netherlands)	2–2 (3–3a agg.)	(France) Nice	Amsterdam, Netherlands
20:45 CEST (UTC+02:00)	Sánchez (yellow card) 9', (goal) 57'; Ziyech (yellow card) 22'; Van de Beek 26'	Report	Souquet 3'; Sarr (yellow card) 18'; Koziello (yellow card) 38'; Eysseric (yellow card) 60'; Marcel 79'	Stadium: Amsterdam Arena; Attendance: 51,845; Referee: Andre Marriner (England)

==== Play-off round ====
16 August 2017 First leg	Napoli (Italy)	2–0	(France) Nice	Naples, Italy
20:45 CEST (UTC+02:00)	Mertens 13'; Insigne (yellow card) 63'; Jorginho 70' (pen.)	Report	Pléa (yellow card) 65' (yellow-red card) 80'; Koziello (red card) 80'	Stadium: Stadio San Paolo; Attendance: 49,324; Referee: Szymon Marciniak (Poland)

22 August 2017 Second leg	Nice (France)	0–2 (0–4 agg.)	(Italy) Napoli	Nice, France
20:45 CEST (UTC+02:00)	Seri (yellow card) 8'; Lees-Melou (yellow card) 82'	Report	Callejón 48'; Koulibaly (yellow card) 84'; Insigne 89'	Stadium: Allianz Riviera; Attendance: 32,103; Referee: Damir Skomina (Slovenia)

=== UEFA Europa League ===
==== Group stage ====
Pos	Team	Pld	W	D	L	GF	GA	GD	Pts	Qualification	LAZ	NCE	ZUL	VIT
1	(Italy) Lazio	6	4	1	1	12	7	+5	13	Advance to knockout phase	—	1–0	2–0	1–1
2	(France) Nice	6	3	0	3	12	7	+5	9	Advance to knockout phase	1–3	—	3–1	3–0
3	(Belgium) Zulte Waregem	6	2	1	3	8	13	−5	7		3–2	1–5	—	1–1
4	(Netherlands) Vitesse	6	1	2	3	5	10	−5	5		2–3	1–0	0–2	—

Source: UEFA
Rules for classification: Group stage tiebreakers

14 September 2017 1	Zulte Waregem (Belgium)	1–5	(France) Nice	Waregem, Belgium
21:05 CEST (UTC+02:00)	Leya Iseka 46', (yellow card) 76'	Report	Pléa 16', 20'; Dante 28'; Balotelli (yellow card) 38', (goal) 74'; Saint-Maximin (yellow card) 54', (goal) 69'	Stadium: Regenboogstadion; Attendance: 9,072; Referee: Ali Palabıyık (Turkey)

28 September 2017 2	Nice (France)	3–0	(Netherlands) Vitesse	Nice, France
19:00 CEST (UTC+02:00)	Pléa 16', 82'; Balotelli (yellow card) 25'; Saint-Maximin 45'	Report	Serero (yellow card) 30'	Stadium: Allianz Riviera; Attendance: 15,006; Referee: Aleksei Eskov (Russia)

20 October 2016 3	Nice (France)	1–3	(Italy) Lazio	Nice, France
19:00 CEST (UTC+02:00)	Balotelli 4'; Mendy (yellow card) 78'	Report	Caicedo 5'; Milinković-Savić 65', 89'; Luiz Felipe (yellow card) 86'	Stadium: Allianz Riviera; Attendance: 21,386; Referee: Craig Thomson (Scotland)

2 November 2017 4	Lazio (Italy)	1–0	(France) Nice	Rome, Italy
21:05 CET (UTC+01:00)	Lucas (yellow card) 75'; Le Marchand 90+2' (o.g.)	Report		Stadium: Stadio Olimpico; Attendance: 21,327; Referee: Jesús Gil Manzano (Spain)

23 November 2017 5	Nice (France)	3–1	(Belgium) Zulte Waregem	Nice, France
19:00 CET (UTC+01:00)	Balotelli 5' (pen.), 31'; Tameze 86'	Report	Hämäläinen 81'	Stadium: Allianz Riviera; Attendance: 20,274; Referee: Luca Banti (Italy)

7 December 2017 6	Vitesse (Netherlands)	1–0	(France) Nice	Arnhem, Netherlands
21:05 CET (UTC+01:00)	Lelieveld (yellow card) 40'; Castaignos 84'	Report	Srarfi (yellow card) 55'; Makengo (yellow card) 68'	Stadium: GelreDome; Attendance: 17,564; Referee: Sandro Schärer (Switzerland)

==== Knockout phase ====
===== Round of 32 =====
15 February 2018 First leg	Nice (France)	2–3	(Russia) Lokomotiv Moscow	Nice, France
19:00 CET (UTC+01:00)	Balotelli 4', 28' (pen.); Coly (red card) 67'	Report	Pejčinović (yellow card) 27'; Fernandes 45' (pen.), 69', 77'	Stadium: Allianz Riviera; Attendance: 16,918; Referee: István Kovács (Romania)

22 February 2018 Second leg	Lokomotiv Moscow (Russia)	1–0 (4–2 agg.)	(France) Nice	Moscow, Russia
17:00 CET (UTC+01:00)	Denisov (yellow card) 8', (goal) 30'; Fernandes (yellow card) 45+1'	Report	Balotelli (yellow card) 32'; Sarr (yellow card) 90+3'; Lees-Melou (yellow card) 90+3'	Stadium: RZD Arena; Attendance: 18,104; Referee: Pavel Královec (Czech Republic)
