= Malang Sarr =

Senegal international footballer (born 1999)

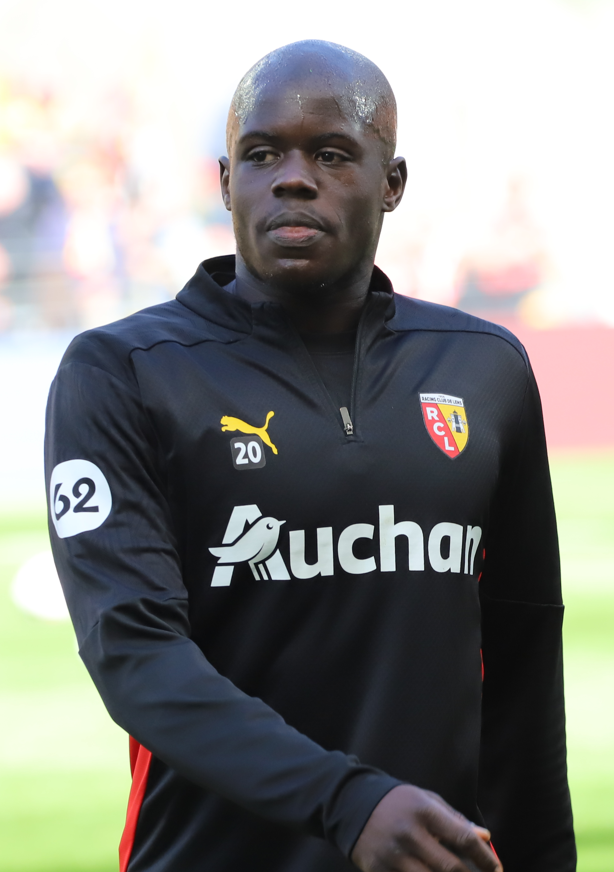
- Sarr with Lens in 2025

Personal information
- Full name: Malang Mamadou William Georges Sarr
- Date of birth: 23 January 1999 (age 27)
- Place of birth: Nice, France
- Height: 1.83 m (6 ft 0 in)
- Position: Centre-back

Team information
- Current team: Neom
- Number: 5

Youth career
- 2005–2016: Nice

Senior career*
Years	Team	Apps	(Gls)
2016–2017	Nice II	13	(0)
2016–2020	Nice	102	(3)
2020–2024	Chelsea	8	(0)
2020–2021	→ Porto (loan)	8	(0)
2020–2021	→ Porto B (loan)	8	(1)
2022–2023	→ Monaco (loan)	13	(0)
2024–2026	Lens	54	(0)
2026–	Neom	10	(0)

International career^{‡}
2014–2015	France U16	9	(1)
2015–2016	France U17	11	(0)
2016–2017	France U18	4	(0)
2017–2018	France U19	10	(0)
2018	France U20	2	(0)
2017–2019	France U21	8	(0)
2026–	Senegal	3	(0)
- * Club domestic league appearances and goals as of 20 October 2026 ‡ National team caps and goals as of 16 November 2026

Malang Mamadou William Georges Sarr (born 23 January 1999) is a professional footballer who plays as a centre-back for Saudi Pro League club Neom. Born in France, he plays for the Senegal national team.

An academy graduate of Nice, Sarr scored on his senior debut in 2016 and made over 100 appearances for the club. He joined Premier League club Chelsea in 2020, where he had two season-long loan moves to Porto in Primeira Liga and back in France to Monaco, before his contract with the English club was terminated in 2024.

Internationally, Sarr represented France at every youth level from under-16 to under-21. In 2026, he switched allegiance to Senegal, and made his senior debut in September of that year.

== Club career ==
=== Nice ===
Born in Nice, Alpes-Maritimes, Sarr joined local side OGC Nice at the age of six. He spent the next 12 years in the club's academy before making his Ligue 1 debut for the club on 14 August 2016 against Rennes, aged 17. He scored the winning goal for his team in the 60th minute, heading home from a Jean Michaël Seri free-kick. In doing so, he became the second youngest player to ever score on debut in Ligue 1, behind Nigerian international Bartholomew Ogbeche. After the match, Sarr dedicated his goal to the victims of the 2016 Nice terror attack. Prior to kick-off a minute's silence was observed in memory of the victims with both Nice and Rennes wearing unique commemorative shirts bearing the names of those who had died. On 7 November 2016, Sarr signed his first professional contract with Nice and by the end of the season had made over 30 appearances as the club ended the league campaign in third place.

In February 2018, Sarr was named by the CIES Football Observatory as the world's fifth-most promising footballer under the age of 20. Competing with Maxime Le Marchand and new loan signing Marlon, Sarr saw his game time slightly reduced but still managed to record 29 appearances across all competitions for the campaign.

On 10 August 2019, the opening day of the 2019–20 Ligue 1 campaign, Sarr made his 100th appearance for Nice across all competitions when he started in a 2–1 win over Amiens. His contract expired on 30 June 2020 and subsequently became a free agent.

=== Chelsea ===
On 27 August 2020, Chelsea announced the signing of Sarr on a five-year deal.

==== 2020–21 season: Loan to Porto ====
On 6 October 2020, Sarr joined the Portuguese side Porto on loan for the rest of the 2020–21 season. On 21 October 2020, Sarr made his Porto debut during their UEFA Champions League group stage tie with Manchester City, featuring for 80 minutes before being replaced by Evanilson in the 3–1 away defeat. Sarr went onto score his only goal for the club in a Taça da Liga tie against Paços de Ferreira in December 2020, netting the opener in their 2–1 victory. Sarr went onto feature 19 times in all competitions for the Dragões before returning to Chelsea ahead of the 2021–22 campaign.

==== 2021–22 season: Return from loan ====
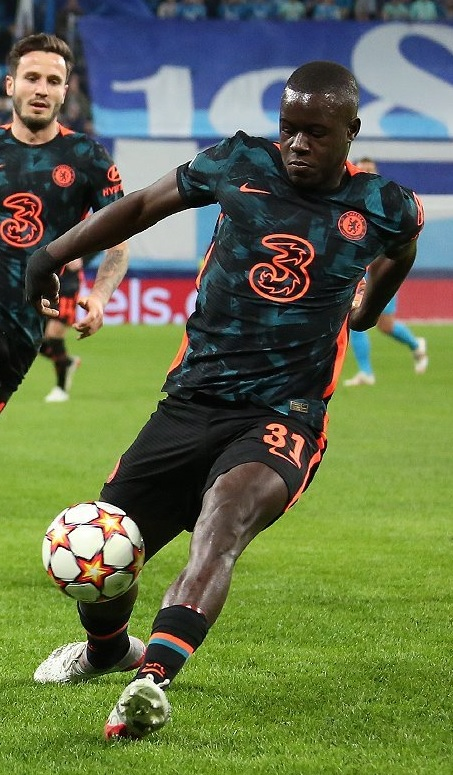
Sarr playing for Chelsea in 2021

Following proposed loan moves to Germany, Italy and France reportedly collapsing, Sarr opted to stay at Chelsea and was subsequently given the number 31 jersey for the forthcoming 2021–22 campaign. On 22 September 2021, Sarr made his Chelsea debut during a 1–1 draw in the EFL Cup against Aston Villa, featuring for the full 90 minutes as the Blues progressed to the fourth round following a 4–3 penalty shootout victory. A month later, he made his Premier League debut against newly promoted Brentford due to the unavailability of Antonio Rüdiger and Thiago Silva, playing the full 90 minutes and keeping a clean sheet during the 1–0 victory.

In January 2022, he started at left-back against Tottenham in the EFL Cup semi-final. It was the start of an extended run in the first-team for Sarr.

On 12 February 2022, Sarr was an extra-time substitute as Chelsea won the 2021 FIFA Club World Cup title, beating Palmeiras. He was also a substitute in the semi-final game against Al-Hilal.

==== 2022–2024: Loan to Monaco and exclusion from the first team ====
On 10 August 2022, Sarr joined Monaco on a season-long loan deal, with an option to buy.

At the beginning of the 2023–24 season, new coach Mauricio Pochettino appeared unable to recognize Sarr as one of his players during a press conference, following his return from loan. However, Sarr later revealed that Pochettino had actually been aware of him and had even attempted to sign him during his tenure as Tottenham manager.

In February 2024, Le Havre sporting director Mathieu Bodmer criticized Chelsea for the collapse of a proposed loan deal that would have covered the remaining 18 months of his contract. Consequently, Sarr did not feature in any matches throughout the season and had to train with the under-21 team.

On 24 July 2024, Sarr's contract with Chelsea was terminated one year before its expiry after a mutual agreement with the club.

=== Lens ===
On 26 July 2024, Lens announced the signing of Sarr on a two-season contract, with the option to extend for a further season.

=== Neom ===
Sarr was signed by Neom SC in 2026 after leaving Lens on a free transfer, joining former Ligue 1 players such as Alexandre Lacazette and Marcin Bułka.

== International career ==
Sarr represented France at various youth levels and in September 2016, he was named captain of the 20-man France under-18 squad by manager Bernard Diomède for the 2016 Limoges Tournament. In 2018, he confirmed that he had been approached by the Senegalese Football Federation to represent the nation but stated that he still had hopes to play for France. Ahead of the 2026 FIFA World Cup, Sarr announced his availability for Senegal; however, he was not selected for the team's squad for the tournament.

He was one of the players who were called up with the Senegal national team by head coach Patrick Vieira for the 2027 Africa Cup of Nations qualification matches against Mozambique and Ethiopia on 25 and 29 September 2026, respectively; and the friendly match against Comoros on 4 October 2026.

== Personal life ==
Sarr was born in the neighbourhood of les Moulins in Nice. He is of Senegalese descent through his parents who immigrated to France prior to his birth.

== Career statistics ==
=== Club ===
As of match played 20 October 2026

Appearances and goals by club, season and competition
Club	Season	League			National cup (Note: Includes Coupe de France, FA Cup, Taça de Portugal, King's Cup)		League cup (Note: Includes Coupe de la Ligue, EFL Cup, Taça da Liga)		Continental		Other		Total	
Club	Season	Division	Apps	Goals	Apps	Goals	Apps	Goals	Apps	Goals	Apps	Goals	Apps	Goals
Nice B	2016–17	Championnat National 2	3	0	—		—		—		—		3	0
Nice B	2017–18	Championnat National 2	1	0	—		—		—		—		1	0
Nice B	Total		4	0	—		—		—		—		4	0
Nice	2016–17	Ligue 1	27	1	1	0	0	0	4 (Note: Appearances in UEFA Europa League)	0	—		32	1
Nice	2017–18	Ligue 1	21	0	1	0	1	0	6 (Note: Three appearances in UEFA Champions League, three appearances in UEFA Europa League)	0	—		29	0
Nice	2018–19	Ligue 1	35	1	1	0	2	0	—		—		38	1
Nice	2019–20	Ligue 1	19	1	0	0	1	0	—		—		20	1
Nice	Total		102	3	3	0	4	0	10	0	—		119	3
Porto (loan)	2020–21	Primeira Liga	8	0	4	0	1	1	6 (Note: Appearances in UEFA Champions League)	0	0	0	19	1
Porto B (loan)	2020–21	Liga Portugal 2	8	1	—		—		—		—		8	1
Chelsea	2021–22	Premier League	8	0	4	0	5	0	2	0	2 (Note: Appearances in FIFA Club World Cup)	0	21	0
Chelsea	2023–24	Premier League	0	0	0	0	0	0	—		0	0	0	0
Chelsea	Total		8	0	4	0	5	0	2	0	2	0	21	0
Monaco (loan)	2022–23	Ligue 1	13	0	1	0	—		3	0	—		17	0
Lens	2024–25	Ligue 1	21	0	1	0	—		1 (Note: Appearance in UEFA Conference League)	0	—		23	0
Lens	2025–26	Ligue 1	33	0	6	0	—		—		—		39	0
Lens	Total		54	0	7	0	—		1	0	0	0	62	0
Neom	2026–27	Saudi Pro League	10	0	1	0	—		—		1 (Note: Appearance in GFF Gulf Club Champions League)	0	12	0
Career total			208	4	20	0	10	1	22	0	3	0	262	5

=== International ===
As of match played 16 November 2026

Appearances and goals by national team and year
National team	Year	Apps	Goals
Senegal	2026	3	0
Total		3	0

== Honours ==
Chelsea

- FIFA Club World Cup: 2021
- FA Cup runner-up: 2021–22
- EFL Cup runner-up: 2021–22

Lens

- Coupe de France: 2025–26

Individual

- UNFP Ligue 1 Team of the Year: 2025–26
