= Jean-Victor Makengo =

French footballer (born 1998)

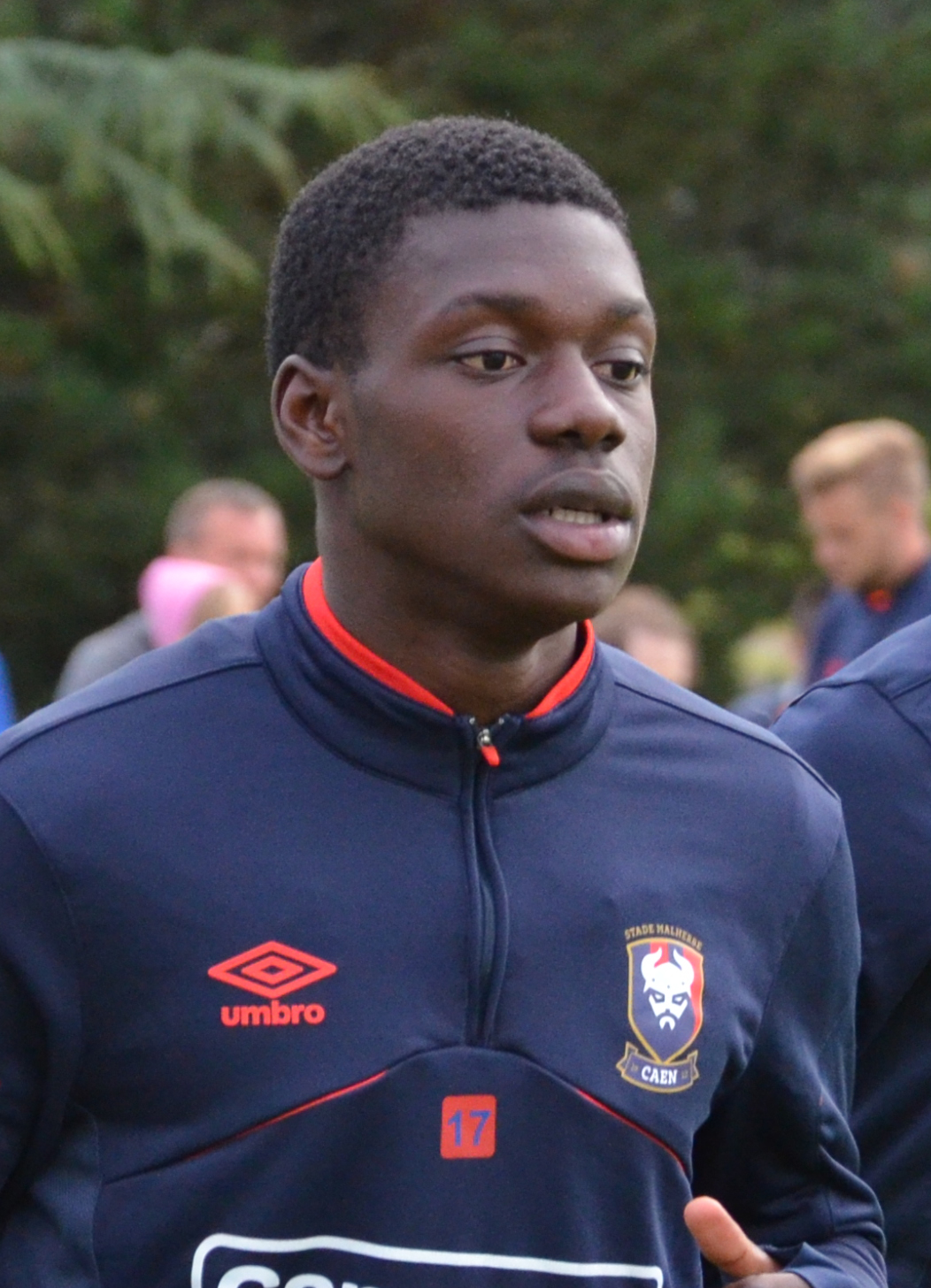
- Makengo with Caen in 2016

Personal information
- Full name: Jean-Victor Makengo
- Date of birth: 12 June 1998 (age 28)
- Place of birth: Étampes, France
- Height: 1.77 m (5 ft 10 in)
- Position: Midfielder

Team information
- Current team: Lorient
- Number: 17

Youth career
- 2004–2009: Étampes FC
- 2009–2010: Malesherbes
- 2010–2011: Linas-Montlhéry
- 2011–2014: Caen

Senior career*
Years	Team	Apps	(Gls)
2014–2017	Caen B	18	(6)
2015–2017	Caen	27	(0)
2017–2018	Nice B	8	(0)
2017–2020	Nice	30	(1)
2019–2020	→ Toulouse (loan)	19	(2)
2020	→ Toulouse B (loan)	1	(0)
2020–2023	Udinese	66	(1)
2023–	Lorient	75	(5)
2024–	Lorient B	2	(0)

International career^{‡}
2014	France U16	7	(1)
2014–2015	France U17	15	(0)
2016	France U18	1	(0)
2016	France U19	2	(0)
2017–2018	France U20	3	(0)
2019	France U21	3	(0)
- * Club domestic league appearances and goals as of 19 May 2026 ‡ National team caps and goals as of 10 October 2019

Jean-Victor Makengo (born 12 June 1998) is a French professional footballer who plays as a midfielder for Ligue 1 club Lorient.

== Club career ==
Makengo is a youth exponent from Caen. He made his Ligue 1 debut on 29 November 2015 against Girondins de Bordeaux. His potential had him linked to top clubs such as both Manchester United and Manchester City. On 31 August 2016, French side Lorient made a €5 million bid for the midfielder, refused by Caen.

He scored his first two goals in a professional match against Nancy in 4–2 in Coupe de la Ligue. He made 17 appearances in Ligue 1 in the 2016–17 season. At the end of the season, he was called up to France U21 team but missed the matches due to injuries.

On 9 June 2017, Makengo joined French side Nice.

On 25 June 2019, Makengo was loaned to Toulouse for one year with an option to buy.

On 5 October 2020, Makengo joined Udinese for five years, with a transfer fee around €3.5 million.

On 30 January 2023, Makengo signed a 4.5-year contract with Lorient.

== Personal life ==
Born in France, Makengo is of DR Congolese descent. He has older siblings, who are both older than him. Makengo is a youth international for France.

== Career statistics ==
=== Club ===
As of 10 May 2025

Appearances and goals by club, season and competition
Club	Season	League			National cup		League cup		Europe		Total	
Club	Season	Division	Apps	Goals	Apps	Goals	Apps	Goals	Apps	Goals	Apps	Goals
Caen B	2014–15	CFA 2	9	1	—		—		—		9	1
Caen B	2015–16	CFA 2	4	5	—		—		—		4	5
Caen B	2016–17	CFA 2	5	0	—		—		—		5	0
Caen B	Total		18	6	—		—		—		18	6
Caen	2015–16	Ligue 1	10	0	1	0	0	0	—		11	0
Caen	2016–17	Ligue 1	17	0	2	0	1	2	—		20	2
Caen	Total		27	0	3	0	1	2	—		31	2
Nice B	2017–18	National 3	7	0	—		—		—		7	0
Nice B	2018–19	National 2	1	0	—		—		—		1	0
Nice B	Total		8	0	—		—		—		8	0
Nice	2017–18	Ligue 1	5	0	0	0	1	0	2 (Note: Appearances in UEFA Europa League)	0	8	0
Nice	2018–19	Ligue 1	25	1	1	0	1	0	—		27	1
Nice	Total		30	1	1	0	2	0	2	0	35	1
Toulouse (loan)	2019–20	Ligue 1	19	2	1	0	2	0	—		22	2
Toulouse B (loan)	2019–20	National 3	1	0	—		—		—		1	0
Udinese	2020–21	Serie A	17	0	2	0	—		—		19	0
Udinese	2021–22	Serie A	33	1	3	0	—		—		36	1
Udinese	2022–23	Serie A	16	0	1	0	—		—		17	0
Udinese	Total		66	1	6	0	—		—		72	1
Lorient	2022–23	Ligue 1	15	0	1	0	—		—		16	0
Lorient	2023–24	Ligue 1	11	0	1	0	—		—		12	0
Lorient	2024–25	Ligue 1	18	1	2	0	—		—		20	1
Lorient	Total		44	1	4	0	—		—		48	1
Lorient B	2024–25	National 3	2	0	—		—		—		2	0
Career total			215	11	15	0	5	2	2	0	237	13

== Honours ==
Lorient

- Ligue 2: 2024–25

France U17

- UEFA European Under-17 Championship: 2015
