= Dante (footballer) =

Brazilian footballer (born 1983)

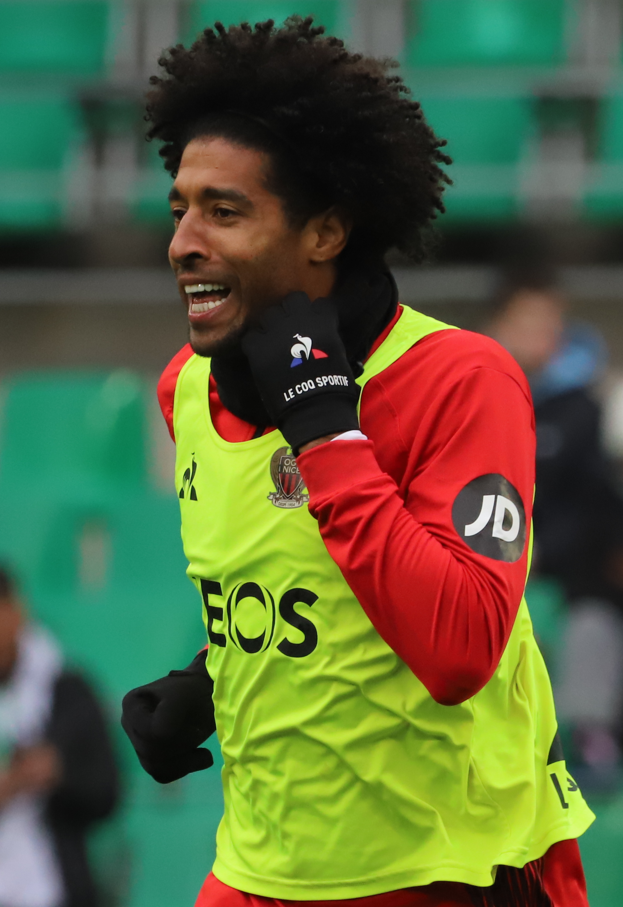
- Dante with Nice in 2025

Personal information
- Full name: Dante Bonfim Costa Santos
- Date of birth: 18 October 1983 (age 43)
- Place of birth: Salvador, Brazil
- Height: 1.88 m (6 ft 2 in)
- Position: Centre-back

Team information
- Current team: Bayern Munich II (head coach)

Youth career
- 1998: Catuense
- 1999: Galícia
- 2000: Capivariano
- 2001: Juventude

Senior career*
Years	Team	Apps	(Gls)
2002–2004	Juventude	55	(2)
2004–2006	Lille	12	(0)
2006–2007	Charleroi	24	(2)
2007–2009	Standard Liège	62	(2)
2009–2012	Borussia Mönchengladbach	93	(8)
2012–2015	Bayern Munich	86	(3)
2015–2016	VfL Wolfsburg	23	(1)
2016–2026	Nice	272	(7)
Total		627	(25)

International career
2013–2014	Brazil	13	(2)

Managerial career
- 2026–: Bayern Munich II
- 2026–: Bayern Munich U19 (only UEFA Youth League)
Medal record
Representing Brazil
Men's football
FIFA Confederations Cup
Winner	2013 Brazil
- * Club domestic league appearances and goals

Dante Bonfim Costa Santos (Brazilian Portuguese: [ˈdɐ̃tʃi bõˈfĩ ˈkɔstɐ ˈsɐ̃tus]; born 18 October 1983), also known as Dante Bonfim or simply Dante, is a Brazilian professional football manager and former player who played as a defender. Primarily a centre-back, he was previously also used as a defensive midfielder or left-back. He currently works as the head coach of Regionalliga Bayern club Bayern Munich II, as well as for the U19 squad in the UEFA Youth League.

After emerging at Juventude, Dante went on to play for Lille, Charleroi and Standard Liège, winning the Belgian Pro League with the latter. In January 2009, he was signed by Borussia Mönchengladbach, spending two-and-a-half seasons before making a €4.7 million move to Bayern Munich, where he won nine domestic and international honours, including a Champions League title. Following a brief stint with VfL Wolfsburg, Dante spent the remainder of his career back in France with Nice, making over 300 appearances, playing ten seasons and going on to captain the side, before retiring in 2026 at the age of 42.

Dante made his international debut for Brazil in 2013, winning that year's Confederations Cup and representing the nation at the 2014 FIFA World Cup, both on home soil.

== Club career ==
=== Early career ===
Dante joined Juventude's youth system in 2001 and by 2002 became a part of the club's first team setup. In 2004, he made his move to European football, signing for Lille in France. After two seasons with the club where he only featured in 12 league games, Dante moved to Belgium, signing for Charleroi in 2006. After a successful campaign in the Belgian Pro League for Charleroi where he made 27 appearances and helped the club to a respectable fifth-place finish, he moved across the country to Standard Liège.

Dante had a successful debut season with the Belgian giants, as Standard were crowned league champions; the Brazilian defender proving to be an integral member, missing just one league match. In his second season with Standard, he featured in the first 15 league matches of the campaign before interest from Germany sent the player to the Bundesliga.

=== Borussia Mönchengladbach ===
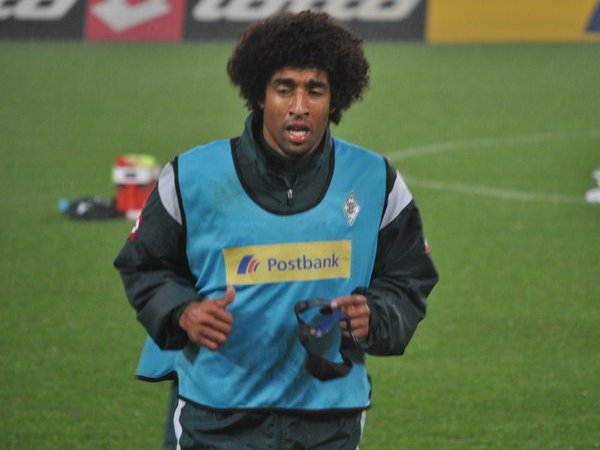
Dante training with Borussia Mönchengladbach in 2011

Dante joined German side Borussia Mönchengladbach on 27 December 2008 for an undisclosed transfer fee, signing a contract with the club until summer 2013. He made his debut for the club on 20 March 2009, coming on as a second-half substitute in a 1–0 loss to fellow strugglers VfL Bochum. His first goal for the club came against eventual champions VfL Wolfsburg on 11 April but it came in a losing effort as 'Gladbach fell 2–1 thanks to a late strike by defender Sascha Riether. The Brazilian scored a dramatic late winner against Energie Cottbus on 13 May, heading in a cross from winger Marko Marin to give the club a 1–0 win in the 91st minute. On the final day of the Bundesliga season on 23 May 2009, Dante scored 'Gladbach's only goal in a 1–1 draw with Borussia Dortmund, a point which meant the club avoided immediate relegation to the 2. Bundesliga.

In the opening fixture of the 2009–10 Bundesliga campaign on 9 August 2009, Dante received a red card for a bad foul as Mönchengladbach relinquished a 3–0 lead against VfL Bochum, drawing 3–3. He scored his first goal of the campaign on 31 October, heading home a corner in the 76th minute to draw the match level at 2–2 and an 82nd-minute strike from Rob Friend handed 'Gladbach a 3–2 victory over Hamburger SV. On 9 April 2010, Dante headed in a free-kick from Juan Arango to double 'Gladbach's lead, resulting in a 2–0 defeat of Eintracht Frankfurt that all but secured Bundesliga survival.

The 2010–11 campaign proved to be another difficult campaign for 'Gladbach. Dante only featured in 17 league matches as he battled against persistent injury and the club finished in 16th place, the relegation play-off spot. However, Dante did play the full 90 minutes in each play-off match against VfL Bochum as Borussia Mönchengladbach managed a 2–1 aggregate victory to remain in the German top flight for the 2011–12 season.

The following season proved much more successful as Dante featured in 38 matches in all competitions, playing the full 90 minutes in each. In January 2012, he hinted he could leave the club before his contract expired in June 2014, revealing to the press he desired to play for a top club in Germany, singling out Bayern Munich, Borussia Dortmund and Bayer Leverkusen. Dante was influential as the club made a run to the semi-finals of the DFB-Pokal where the club lost 4–2 on penalties to Bayern Munich on 21 March 2012, with Dante and Håvard Nordtveit missing their penalties to give Bayern a spot in the final with champions Borussia Dortmund.

=== Bayern Munich ===
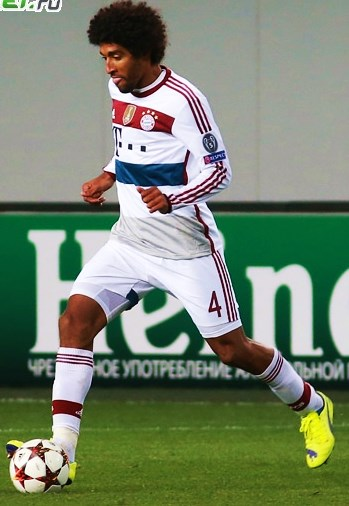
Dante playing for Bayern Munich in 2014

On 26 April 2012, Dante agreed to join Bayern Munich at the start of the 2012–13 season for an estimated transfer fee of €4.7 million.

==== 2012–13 ====
Dante's first appearance for the club came in the DFL-Supercup on 12 August 2012, starting at centre-back in Bayern's 2–1 defeat of Borussia Dortmund. He made his Bundesliga debut for the Bavarian giants on 25 August as Bayern cruised to a 3–0 opening day victory over promoted side Greuther Fürth. He scored his first competitive goal for the team in a 5–0 thrashing of Hannover 96 on 24 November 2012. Dante made an immediate impact at Bayern, earning a place in the starting 11 and forming partnerships with the interchanging Holger Badstuber, Daniel Van Buyten and Jérôme Boateng in the centre of defence.

Following the defender's impressive start with Die Roten, head coach Jupp Heynckes told media Dante was one of the first names on the team sheet, with club captain Phillip Lahm supporting the manager's sentiments: "Dante is one of the best defenders I've ever played with." He secured his first Bundesliga title since moving to Germany after a 1–0 defeat of Eintracht Frankfurt on 6 April 2013 and was seen celebrating with the supporters in the stands following the result. In the Champions League final against Borussia Dortmund, Dante conceded a penalty for a rash challenge but failed to receive a red card in an entertaining 2–1 victory for the Bavarians.

With Dante at the heart the defence, Bayern broke records for fewest goals conceded and most clean sheets in a Bundesliga season during their treble-winning campaign.

==== 2013–14 ====
In new manager Pep Guardiola's first Bundesliga match, against Dante's former club Borussia Mönchengladbach, Dante scored an own goal after a mix-up with goalkeeper Manuel Neuer. The match nonetheless ended in a 3–1 victory for Bayern.

On 21 December 2013, Dante scored the opening goal as Bayern beat Raja Casablanca 2–0 in the final of the 2013 FIFA Club World Cup.

In February 2014, Dante scored three goals in the space of four matches for Bayern, in Bundesliga wins over Eintracht Frankfurt (5–0) and SC Freiburg (4–0) and a DFB-Pokal victory over Hamburger SV (5–0).

On 24 March 2014, Dante extended his contract with Bayern until June 2017.

=== VfL Wolfsburg ===
On 30 August 2015, Dante agreed to move to VfL Wolfsburg for an undisclosed transfer fee. On 13 January 2016, Dante injured teammate Bas Dost in training. Later that month, on 24 January, he scored the only goal for the club in a 3–2 away defeat against Eintracht Frankfurt.

=== Nice ===
On 22 August 2016, VfL Wolfsburg announced the departure of Dante to French Ligue 1 side Nice, with which he signed a three-year contract. On 18 February 2018, he scored his first goal for the club in a 1–1 draw with Nantes. On 8 February 2025, at the age of 41, Dante made his 250th league appearance and 300th overall appearance for Nice. Shortly after, he signed a one year extension with the club, keeping him there until the end of the 2025–26 season.

On 10 February 2023, in a Ligue 1 game against Ajaccio, Dante opened the score to become at 39 years and 3 months Nice’s oldest ever goalscorer. On 24 September 2025, he played in a UEFA Europa League match against Roma, to become the competition's oldest outfield player, aged 41 years and 11 months.

On 22 May 2026, Dante played in and lost the Coupe de France final against Lens, to become at 42 years and 7 months the oldest player to feature in a Coupe de France final. Later that month, on 29 May 2026, he captained his team to a 4–1 victory over Saint-Étienne in the relegation play-offs second leg, securing the club's Ligue 1 status in what proved to be the final match of his professional career before retirement.

== Fan culture ==
In his time at Borussia Mönchengladbach, Dante was well known for his hair, becoming a cult hero with Borussia fans regularly sporting large afro wigs as an homage to their favourite player. Bayern fans continued this tradition after the defender's move to Munich.

== International career ==
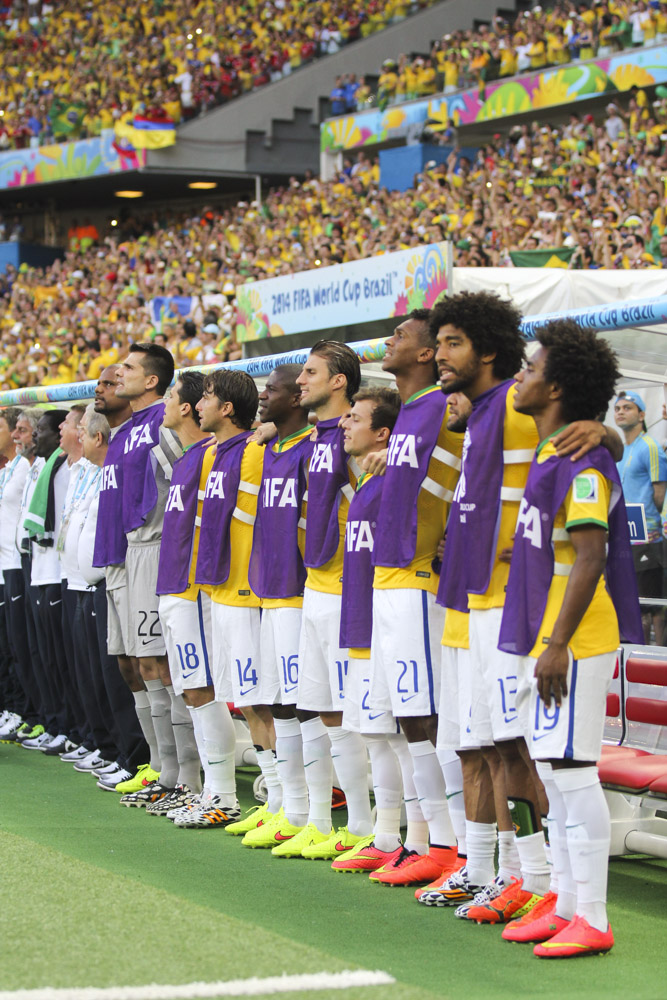
Dante (#13) at the 2014 FIFA World Cup.

Dante received his first call-up to the Brazil national team on 21 January 2013 by returning coach Luiz Felipe Scolari to be part of the squad for a friendly against England, on 6 February at Wembley Stadium. He started the game, which England won 2–1 after goals from Wayne Rooney and Frank Lampard.

On 22 June 2013, he scored his first international goal in the final group match of the 2013 FIFA Confederations Cup, against Italy at the stroke of half-time, after coming on as a substitute for David Luiz on the 33rd minute.

Dante was a member of Brazil's squad for the 2014 FIFA World Cup, making his only appearance in the semi-final as a replacement for the suspended captain Thiago Silva, as the Seleção were defeated by Germany in a record 7–1 scoreline.

In a comment regarding the defeat, Dante said he had "been treated with 'less respect'". The match would prove to be his final appearance for Brazil.

== Coaching and managerial career ==
Just after retiring, on 2 June 2026, Dante returned to Bayern Munich, this time as head coach of its reserve team, Regionalliga Bayern club Bayern Munich II ahead of the 2026–27 season, replacing Holger Seitz and becoming the first Brazilian head coach in the club's history. He also took on as head coach for the U19 squad in the UEFA Youth League.

== Personal life ==
Dante is married and has two children. His uncle, Jonilson Veloso, is a football manager.

== Career statistics ==
=== Club ===
Appearances and goals by club, season and competition
Club	Season	League			National cup (Note: Includes Coupe de France, Belgian Cup, DFB-Pokal)		League cup (Note: Includes Coupe de la Ligue)		Continental		Other		Total	
Club	Season	Division	Apps	Goals	Apps	Goals	Apps	Goals	Apps	Goals	Apps	Goals	Apps	Goals
Juventude	2002	Série A	20	0	—		—		—		0	0	20	0
Juventude	2003	Série A	20	1	—		—		—		2 (Note: Appearances in Campeonato Gaúcho)	1	22	2
Juventude	2004	Série A	13	0	—		—		—		0	0	13	0
Juventude	Total		53	1	—		—		—		2	1	55	2
Lille	2003–04	Ligue 1	9	0	0	0	0	0	—		—		9	0
Lille	2004–05	Ligue 1	2	0	0	0	1	0	4 (Note: Appearances in UEFA Intertoto Cup)	0	—		7	0
Lille	2005–06	Ligue 1	1	0	1	0	1	1	—		—		3	1
Lille	Total		12	0	1	0	2	1	4	0	—		19	1
Charleroi	2005–06	Belgian First Division	12	1	3	0	—		—		—		15	1
Charleroi	2006–07	Belgian First Division	12	1	0	0	—		—		—		12	1
Charleroi	Total		24	2	3	0	—		—		—		27	2
Standard Liège	2006–07	Belgian First Division	15	0	6	0	—		—		—		21	0
Standard Liège	2007–08	Belgian First Division	32	1	6	1	—		4 (Note: Appearances in UEFA Cup)	0	—		42	2
Standard Liège	2008–09	Belgian First Division	15	1	2	0	—		7 (Note: Two appearances in UEFA Champions League, five appearances in UEFA Cup)	0	1 (Note: Appearance in Belgian Super Cup)	0	25	1
Standard Liège	Total		62	2	14	1	—		11	0	1	0	88	3
Borussia Mönchengladbach	2008–09	Bundesliga	10	3	0	0	—		—		—		10	3
Borussia Mönchengladbach	2009–10	Bundesliga	32	3	2	0	—		—		—		34	3
Borussia Mönchengladbach	2010–11	Bundesliga	18	2	1	0	—		—		2 (Note: Appearances in Bundesliga relegation play-offs)	0	21	2
Borussia Mönchengladbach	2011–12	Bundesliga	33	0	5	0	—		—		—		38	0
Borussia Mönchengladbach	Total		93	8	8	0	—		—		2	0	103	8
Bayern Munich	2012–13	Bundesliga	29	1	3	0	—		12 (Note: Appearances in UEFA Champions League)	0	1 (Note: Appearance in DFL-Supercup)	0	45	1
Bayern Munich	2013–14	Bundesliga	29	2	6	1	—		9	0	3 (Note: One appearance in DFL-Supercup, one appearance in UEFA Super Cup, one appearance and one goal in FIFA Club World Cup)	1	47	4
Bayern Munich	2014–15	Bundesliga	27	0	4	0	—		7	0	1	0	39	0
Bayern Munich	2015–16	Bundesliga	1	0	1	0	—		—		0	0	2	0
Bayern Munich	Total		86	3	14	1	—		28	0	5	1	133	5
VfL Wolfsburg	2015–16	Bundesliga	23	1	1	0	—		9	0	—		33	1
Nice	2016–17	Ligue 1	33	0	0	0	1	0	5 (Note: Appearances in UEFA Europa League)	0	—		39	0
Nice	2017–18	Ligue 1	33	1	1	0	2	0	12 (Note: Four appearances in UEFA Champions League, eight appearances and one goal in UEFA Europa League)	1	—		48	2
Nice	2018–19	Ligue 1	36	1	0	0	1	0	—		—		37	1
Nice	2019–20	Ligue 1	21	1	3	0	1	0	—		—		25	1
Nice	2020–21	Ligue 1	9	2	0	0	—		2	0	—		11	2
Nice	2021–22	Ligue 1	34	0	4	0	—		—		—		38	0
Nice	2022–23	Ligue 1	37	1	1	0	—		11 (Note: Appearances in UEFA Europa Conference League)	0	—		49	1
Nice	2023–24	Ligue 1	32	1	3	0	—		—		—		35	1
Nice	2024–25	Ligue 1	25	0	0	0	—		3	0	—		28	0
Nice	2025–26	Ligue 1	12	0	2	0	—		4 (Note: One appearance in UEFA Champions League, three appearances in UEFA Europa League)	0	1 (Note: Appearance in Ligue 1 relegation/promotion play-offs)	0	19	0
Nice	Total		272	7	14	0	5	0	37	1	1	0	329	8
Career total			625	24	55	2	7	1	89	1	11	2	787	30

=== International ===
Appearances and goals by national team and year
National team	Year	Apps	Goals
Brazil	2013	10	2
Brazil	2014	3	0
Total		13	2

Scores and results list Brazil's goal tally first, score column indicates score after each Dante goal.

List of international goals scored by Dante
No.	Date	Venue	Opponent	Score	Result	Competition
1	22 June 2013	Arena Fonte Nova, Salvador, Brazil	Italy	1–0	4–2	2013 FIFA Confederations Cup
2	16 November 2013	Sun Life Stadium, Miami, United States	Honduras	2–0	4–0	Friendly

== Honours ==
Lille

- UEFA Intertoto Cup: 2004

Standard Liège

- Belgian Pro League: 2007–08, 2008–09
- Belgian Super Cup: 2008

Bayern Munich

- Bundesliga: 2012–13, 2013–14, 2014–15
- DFB-Pokal: 2012–13, 2013–14
- DFL-Supercup: 2012
- UEFA Champions League: 2012–13
- UEFA Super Cup: 2013
- FIFA Club World Cup: 2013

Nice

- Coupe de France runner-up: 2021–22, 2025–26

Brazil

- FIFA Confederations Cup: 2013

Individual

- ESM Team of the Year: 2012–13
