= Rémi Walter =

French footballer (born 1995)

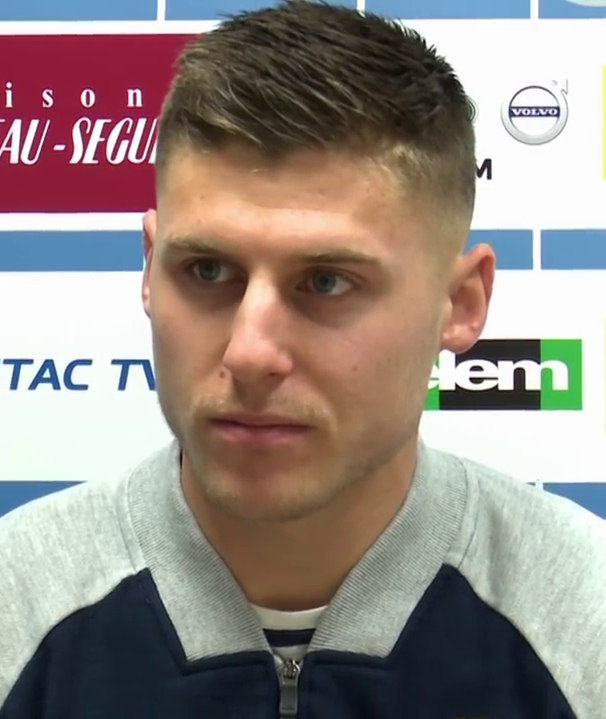
- Walter with Troyes in 2018

Personal information
- Full name: Rémi Walter
- Date of birth: 26 April 1995 (age 31)
- Place of birth: Essey-lès-Nancy, Meurthe-et-Moselle, France
- Height: 1.74 m (5 ft 9 in)
- Position: Defensive midfielder

Youth career
- 2001–2003: Saint Max-Essey FC
- 2003–2013: Nancy

Senior career*
Years	Team	Apps	(Gls)
2012–2016	Nancy	71	(3)
2012–2015	Nancy II	9	(0)
2016–2020	Nice	62	(3)
2016	Nice II	1	(0)
2018	→ Troyes (loan)	12	(0)
2020	Yeni Malatyaspor	9	(0)
2021–2024	Sporting Kansas City	114	(9)

International career
2012	France U17	8	(0)
2013	France U19	5	(0)
2014	France U20	2	(0)
2015–2016	France U21	11	(0)
- * Club domestic league appearances and goals as of 15 November 2024

Rémi Walter (born 26 April 1995) is a French professional footballer who plays as a defensive midfielder.

== Career ==
Walter made his full debut with Nancy on 3 August 2013 in a goalless home draw against AJ Auxerre playing the full game. He scored his first goal for Nancy on 30 August 2013 in a 2–3 home defeat against Tours FC.

On 22 December 2020, Walter joined Major League Soccer club Sporting Kansas City. He made his club debut on 17 April 2021 against the New York Red Bulls, starting in a 2–1 victory. Walter played as both central midfielder and defensive midfielder for Sporting in 2021 and 2022. Walter was released by Kansas City following their 2024 season.

== Career statistics ==
As of match played 24 May 2019

Club statistics
Club	Season	League			National Cup		League Cup		Continental		Total	
Club	Season	Division	Apps	Goals	Apps	Goals	Apps	Goals	Apps	Goals	Apps	Goals
Nancy	2012–13	Ligue 1	0	0	0	0	0	0	—		0	0
Nancy	2013–14	Ligue 2	28	2	1	0	2	1	—		31	3
Nancy	2014–15	Ligue 2	31	1	1	0	1	0	—		33	1
Nancy	2015–16	Ligue 2	12	0	1	0	1	0	—		14	0
Nancy	Total		71	3	3	0	4	1	0	0	78	4
Nancy II	2012–13	CFA	6	0	—						6	0
Nancy II	2013–14	CFA 2	2	0	—						2	0
Nancy II	2014–15	CFA 2	1	0	—						1	0
Nancy II	Total		9	0	0	0	0	0	0	0	9	0
Nice	2015–16	Ligue 1	12	0	0	0	0	0	—		12	0
Nice	2016–17	Ligue 1	22	0	0	0	0	0	4 (Note: Appearances in the UEFA Europa League)	0	26	0
Nice	2017–18	Ligue 1	8	1	0	0	0	0	5 (Note: Two appearances in the UEFA Champions League & Three appearances in the UEFA Europa League)	0	13	1
Nice	2018–19	Ligue 1	19	2	1	0	2	2	—		22	4
Nice	Total		61	3	1	0	2	2	9	0	73	5
Nice II	2015–16	CFA	1	0	—						1	0
Troyes (loan)	2017–18	Ligue 1	12	0	2	0	2	0	—		16	0
Career totals			154	6	6	0	8	3	9	0	177	9
