= Walter Benítez (footballer) =

Argentine footballer (born 1993)

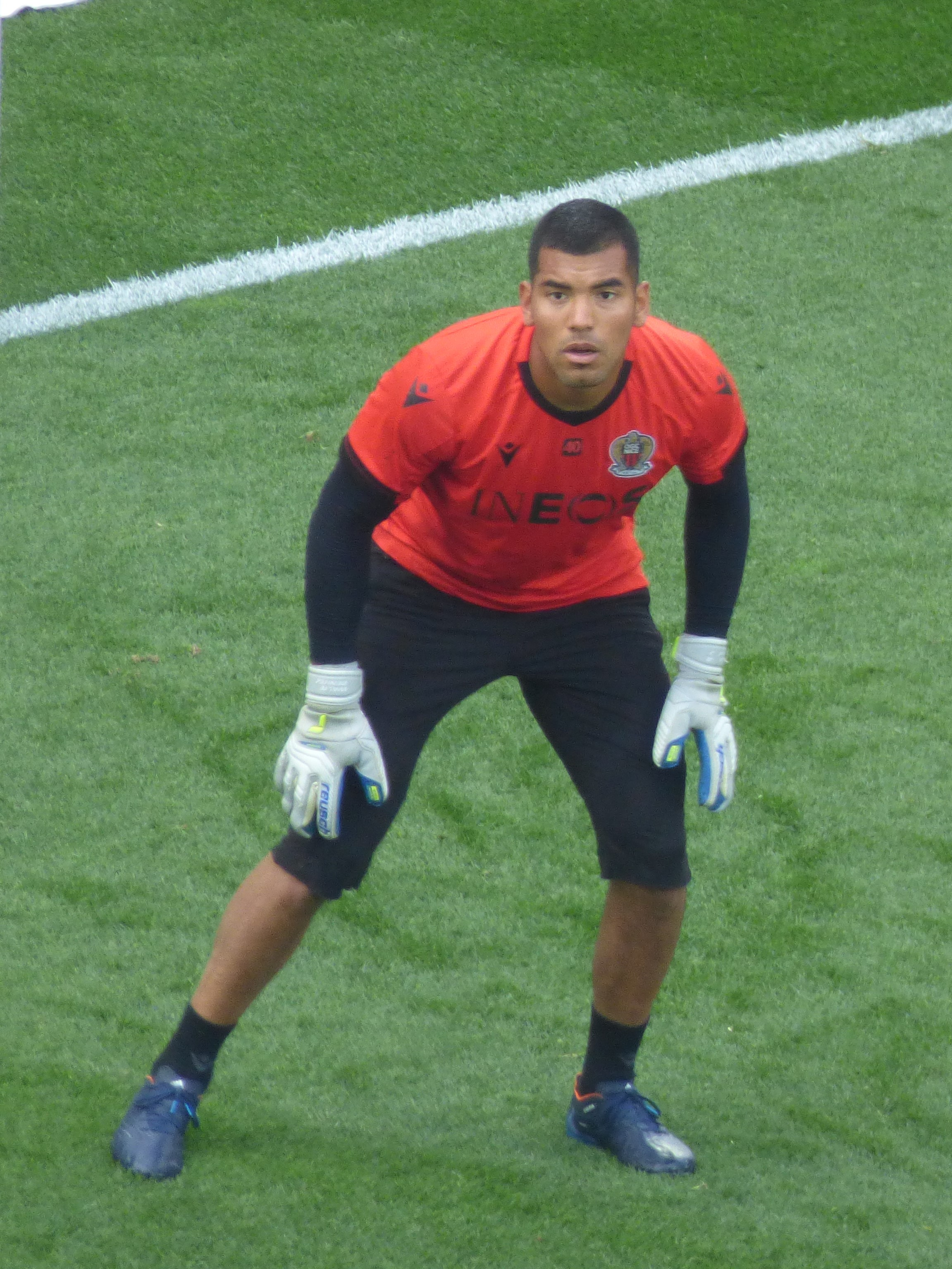
- Benítez with Nice in 2022

Personal information
- Full name: Walter Daniel Benítez
- Date of birth: 19 January 1993 (age 33)
- Place of birth: General José de San Martín, Chaco, Argentina
- Height: 1.91 m (6 ft 3 in)
- Position: Goalkeeper

Team information
- Current team: Crystal Palace
- Number: 44

Youth career
- –2013: Quilmes

Senior career*
Years	Team	Apps	(Gls)
2011–2016	Quilmes	48	(0)
2016	Nice B	2	(0)
2016–2022	Nice	167	(0)
2022–2025	PSV	97	(0)
2025–	Crystal Palace	6	(0)

International career^{‡}
2013	Argentina U20	3	(0)
2024	Argentina	1	(0)
- * Club domestic league appearances and goals as of 19:30, 25 October 2026 (UTC) ‡ National team caps and goals as of 26 March 2024

Walter Daniel Benítez (born 19 January 1993) is an Argentine professional footballer who plays as a goalkeeper for Premier League club Crystal Palace.

== Club career ==
Benítez started his career at Quilmes before joining Ligue 1 club Nice in summer 2016. He signed a four-year contract with Eredivisie club PSV in June 2022. During three seasons at the club, he won two league titles, two Johan Cruyff Shields and a KNVB Cup.

On 23 June 2025, Benítez reached an agreement to join Premier League side Crystal Palace, with the move set to be completed on 1 July. He made his debut in the EFL Cup against rivals Millwall on 16 September; after the match finished 1–1, he saved two penalties in the ensuing shootout to help Palace triumph 4–2.

== International career ==
In June 2023, Benítez received his first call-up the Argentine senior squad for two friendly matches against Australia and Indonesia.

He made his Albiceleste debut on 26 March 2024 in a friendly 3–1 win against Costa Rica.

== Personal life ==
Born in Argentina, Benítez is of Paraguayan descent through a grandfather.

== Career statistics ==
=== Club ===
As of match played 25 October 2026

Appearances and goals by club, season and competition
Club	Season	League			National cup (Note: Includes Copa Argentina, Coupe de France, FA Cup)		League cup (Note: Includes Coupe de la Ligue, EFL Cup)		Continental		Other		Total	
Club	Season	Division	Apps	Goals	Apps	Goals	Apps	Goals	Apps	Goals	Apps	Goals	Apps	Goals
Quilmes	2011–12	Primera Nacional	0	0	0	0	—		—		—		0	0
Quilmes	2012–13	AFA Liga Profesional de Fútbol	0	0	0	0	—		—		—		0	0
Quilmes	2013–14	AFA Liga Profesional de Fútbol	6	0	0	0	—		—		—		6	0
Quilmes	2014	AFA Liga Profesional de Fútbol	14	0	3	0	—		—		—		17	0
Quilmes	2015	AFA Liga Profesional de Fútbol	21	0	0	0	—		—		—		21	0
Quilmes	2016	AFA Liga Profesional de Fútbol	7	0	—		—		—		—		7	0
Quilmes	Total		48	0	3	0	—		0	0	—		51	0
Nice B	2016–17	CFA	2	0	—		—		—		—		2	0
Nice	2016–17	Ligue 1	3	0	1	0	1	0	1 (Note: Appearance(s) in UEFA Europa League)	0	—		6	0
Nice	2017–18	Ligue 1	28	0	0	0	1	0	4	0	—		33	0
Nice	2018–19	Ligue 1	35	0	1	0	2	0	0	0	—		38	0
Nice	2019–20	Ligue 1	26	0	3	0	0	0	0	0	—		29	0
Nice	2020–21	Ligue 1	38	0	2	0	—		5	0	—		45	0
Nice	2021–22	Ligue 1	37	0	0	0	—		0	0	—		37	0
Nice	Total		167	0	7	0	4	0	10	0	—		188	0
PSV	2022–23	Eredivisie	30	0	0	0	—		11 (Note: Four appearances in UEFA Champions League, seven appearances in UEFA Europa League)	0	1 (Note: Appearance in Johan Cruyff Shield)	0	42	0
PSV	2023–24	Eredivisie	33	0	0	0	—		12 (Note: Appearances in UEFA Champions League)	0	1	0	46	0
PSV	2024–25	Eredivisie	34	0	0	0	—		11	0	1	0	46	0
PSV	Total		97	0	0	0	—		34	0	3	0	134	0
Crystal Palace	2025–26	Premier League	1	0	1	0	3	0	3 (Note: Appearances in UEFA Conference League)	0	0	0	8	0
Crystal Palace	2026–27	Premier League	5	0	0	0	0	0	3	0	—		8	0
Crystal Palace	Total		6	0	1	0	3	0	6	0	0	0	16	0
Career total			319	0	11	0	7	0	50	0	3	0	390	0

== Honours ==
PSV

- Eredivisie: 2023–24, 2024–25
- KNVB Cup: 2022–23
- Johan Cruyff Shield: 2022, 2023

Crystal Palace

- FA Community Shield: 2025
- UEFA Conference League: 2025–26
