= Adrien Tameze =

Association football player (born 1994)

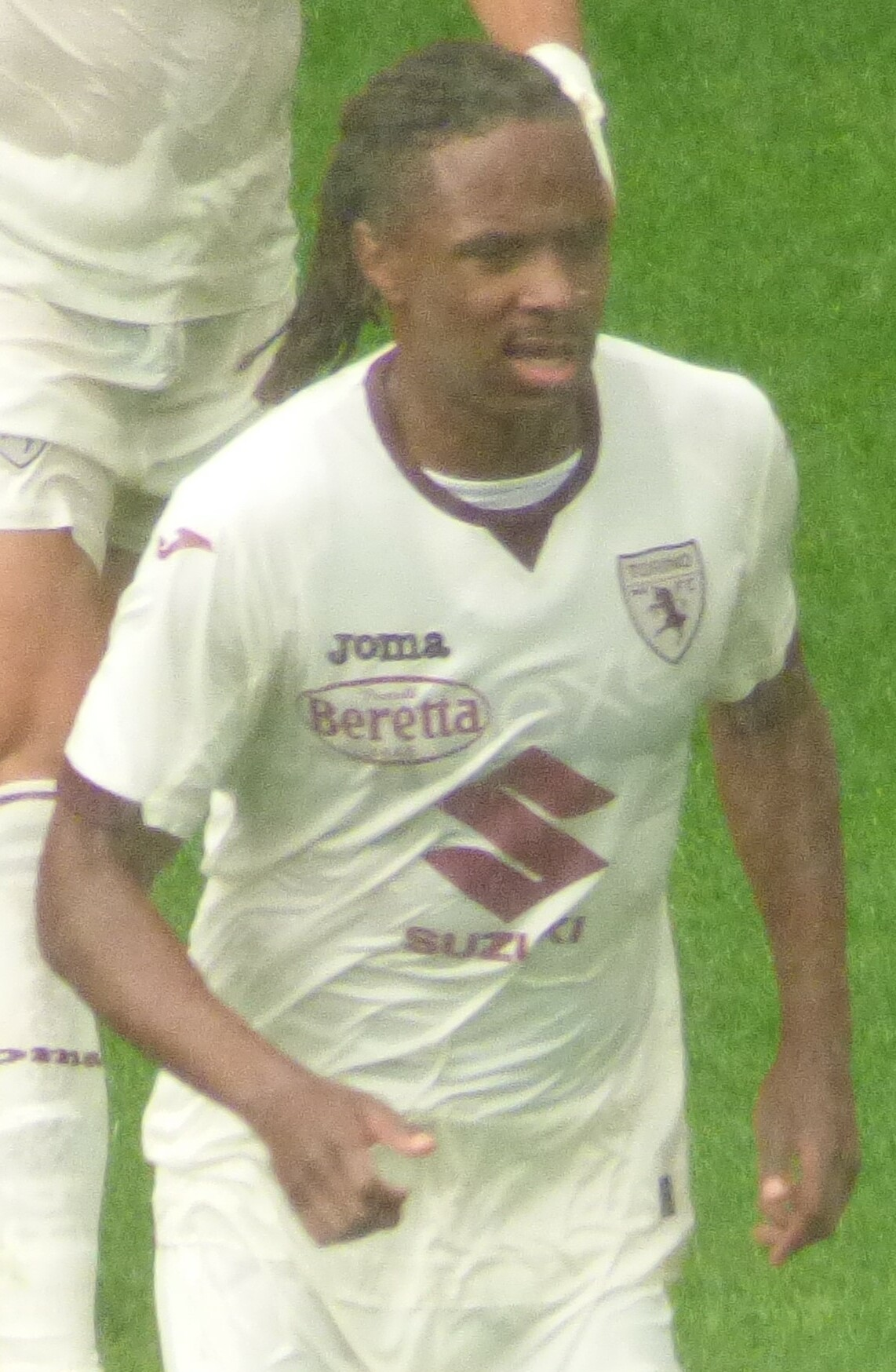
- Tameze playing for Torino in 2023

Personal information
- Full name: Adrien Fidèle Tameze Aoutsa
- Date of birth: 4 February 1994 (age 32)
- Place of birth: Lille, France
- Height: 1.82 m (6 ft 0 in)
- Positions: Midfielder; centre-back

Youth career
- 2000–2006: Lille
- 2006–2008: Iris C. de Lambersart
- 2008–2009: ES de Wasquehal
- 2009–2014: Nancy

Senior career*
Years	Team	Apps	(Gls)
2010–2014	Nancy B	53	(3)
2014–2016	Valenciennes B	18	(0)
2014–2017	Valenciennes	56	(1)
2017–2020	Nice	71	(1)
2020	→ Atalanta (loan)	7	(0)
2020–2023	Hellas Verona	108	(5)
2023–2026	Torino	73	(0)

International career^{‡}
2010	France U16	9	(1)
2010–2011	France U17	20	(0)
2011	France U18	3	(0)
- * Club domestic league appearances and goals as of 25 May 2026 ‡ National team caps and goals as of 27 August 2011

Adrien Fidele Tameze Aoutsa (born 4 February 1994) is a professional footballer who plays as a midfielder.

Born in France to Cameroonian parents, Tameze represented his native country at youth level. In 2018, he was called up to play for the Cameroon national team.

== Early life ==
Tameze acquired French nationality by naturalization on 26 October 2004.

== Club career ==
On 31 January 2020, Tameze joined Italian Serie A club Atalanta on loan with an option to purchase. On 3 September 2020, he signed to Hellas Verona until 30 June 2024.

== International career ==
After having represented France at youth levels, Tameze accepted a call to play for Cameroon in August 2018 as he was eligible through his parents.

== Career statistics ==
=== Club ===
As of match played 25 May 2025

Appearances and goals by club, season and competition
Club	Season	League			National Cup (Note: Includes Coupe de France, Coppa Italia)		League Cup (Note: Includes Coupe de la Ligue)		Europe		Other		Total	
Club	Season	Division	Apps	Goals	Apps	Goals	Apps	Goals	Apps	Goals	Apps	Goals	Apps	Goals
Nancy	2012–13	Ligue 1	0	0	2	0	0	0	—		—		2	0
Valenciennes	2015–16	Ligue 2	21	1	2	0	1	0	—		—		24	1
Valenciennes	2016–17	Ligue 2	35	0	1	0	1	0	—		—		37	0
Valenciennes	Total		56	1	3	0	2	0	—		—		61	1
Nice	2017–18	Ligue 1	26	0	1	0	2	0	7 (Note: One appearance in UEFA Champions League, six appearances and one goal in UEFA Europa League)	1	—		36	1
Nice	2018–19	Ligue 1	37	0	1	0	2	0	—		—		40	0
Nice	2019–20	Ligue 1	8	1	0	0	1	0	—		—		9	1
Nice	Total		71	1	2	0	5	0	7	1	—		85	2
Atalanta (loan)	2019–20	Serie A	7	0	0	0	—		2 (Note: Appearance(s) in UEFA Champions League)	0	—		9	0
Hellas Verona	2020–21	Serie A	33	1	2	0	—		—		—		35	1
Hellas Verona	2021–22	Serie A	38	4	2	0	—		—		—		40	4
Hellas Verona	2022–23	Serie A	37	0	1	0	—		—		1 (Note: Appearance(s) in Serie A relegation tie-breaker)	0	39	0
Hellas Verona	Total		108	5	5	0	—		—		1	0	114	5
Torino	2023–24	Serie A	29	0	2	0	—		—		—		31	0
Torino	2024–25	Serie A	20	0	2	0	—		—		—		22	0
Torino	Total		49	0	4	0	—		—		—		53	0
Career total			291	7	16	0	7	0	9	1	1	0	324	8
