= Ignatius Ganago =

Cameroonian footballer (born 1999)

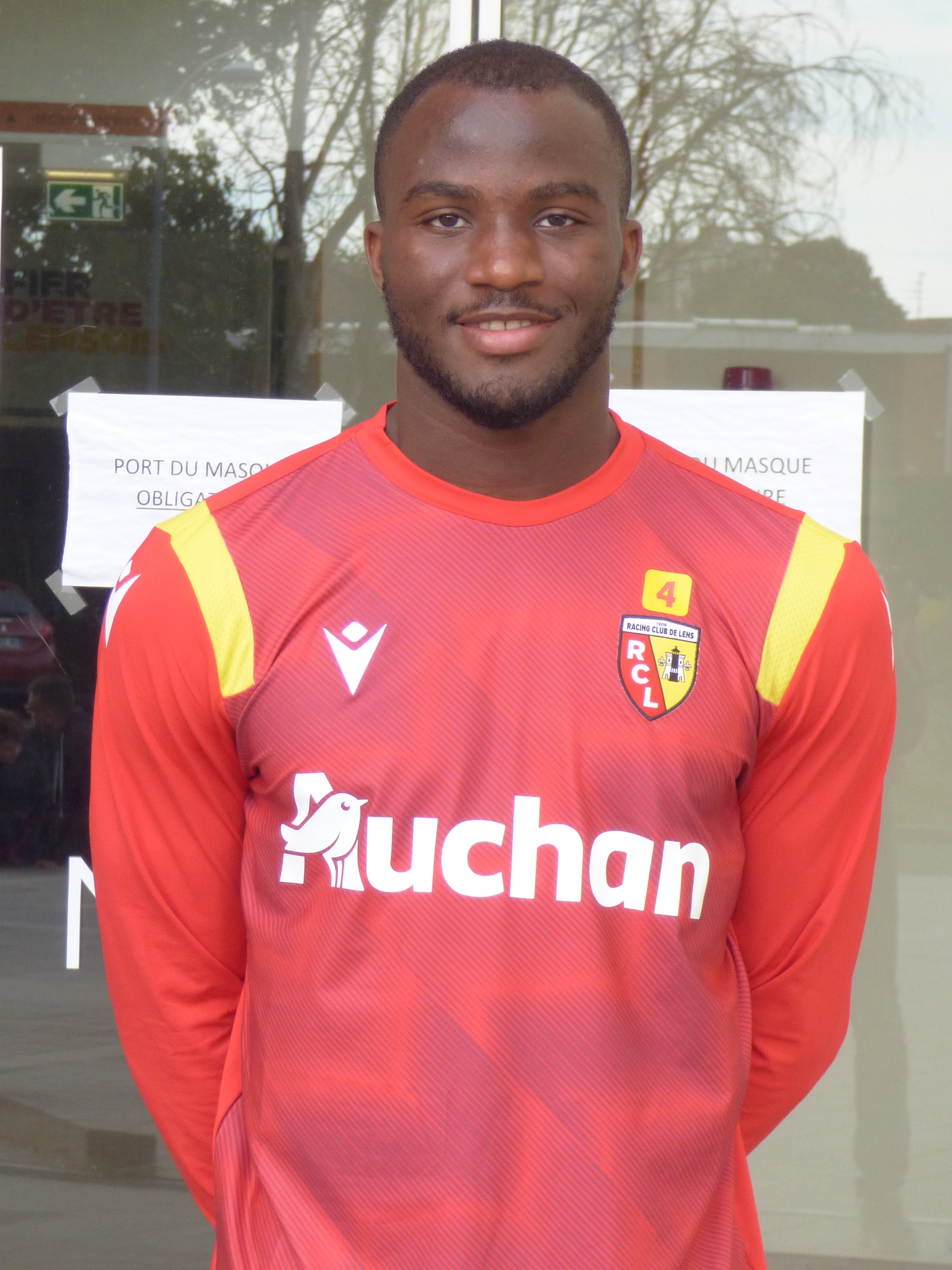
- Ganago with Lens in 2020

Personal information
- Full name: Ignatius Kpene Ganago
- Date of birth: 16 February 1999 (age 27)
- Place of birth: Douala, Cameroon
- Height: 1.76 m (5 ft 9 in)
- Position: Forward

Team information
- Current team: Nantes
- Number: 37

Youth career
- 2011–2017: EFCB
- 2017: Nice

Senior career*
| Years | Team | Apps | (Gls) |
| 2017–2020 | Nice B | 13 | (9) |
| 2017–2020 | Nice | 52 | (6) |
| 2020–2022 | Lens | 56 | (12) |
| 2022– | Nantes | 57 | (8) |
| 2025 | → New England Revolution (loan) | 22 | (3) |

International career^{‡}
| 2019– | Cameroon | 15 | (0) |
Medal record
Men's football
Representing Cameroon
Africa Cup of Nations
| Third place | 2021 Cameroon |
- * Club domestic league appearances and goals as of 17:00, 2 May 2026 (UTC) ‡ National team caps and goals as of 19:38, 19 March 2025 (GMT)

Ignatius Ganago (born 16 February 1999) is a Cameroonian professional footballer who plays as a forward for Ligue 1 club Nantes and the Cameroon national team.

== Club career ==
=== Early career ===
Ganago was part of the EFCB junior academy in Cameroon before joining Nice in 2017.

=== Nice ===
Ganago made his professional debut for Nice in a 4–0 Ligue 1 win against Monaco on 9 September 2017, coming on for Mario Balotelli in the 74th minute, during which he also scored his first goal for the club.

=== Lens ===
On 10 July 2020, Ganago signed for newly promoted Ligue 1 club Lens.

=== Nantes ===
On 1 September 2022, the last day of the 2022 summer transfer window, Ganago moved to Lens' league rivals Nantes on a four-year contract. The transfer fee paid to Lens was reported as €3.5 million excluding bonuses.

=== New England Revolution ===
On 10 January 2025, it was announced that Ganago would be joining New England Revolution in Major League Soccer on a six-month loan with an option to purchase, and the potential to extend the loan by six additional months if playing-time conditions are met. Ganago made his MLS debut, and recorded his first start for the Revolution, in the 2025 season opener, a 0–0 draw against Nashville SC on 22 February. He scored his first Revolution goal, and recorded his first Revolution assist, on 19 April against NYCFC. He subsequently received MLS Team of the Matchday honors for week 9.

== International career ==
Ganago debuted for the senior Cameroon national team in a friendly 0–0 tie with Tunisia on 12 October 2019. Later that month his club Nice refused to release him for the Under-23 AFCON tournament.

== Personal life ==
Ganago's four-year-old daughter died on 13 February 2023, following an illness.

== Career statistics ==
=== Club ===
As of match played 2 May 2026

Appearances and goals by club, season and competition
| Club | Season | League | | | National cup (Note: Includes Coupe de France) | | League cup (Note: Includes Coupe de la Ligue) | | Continental | | Total | |
| Club | Season | Division | Apps | Goals | Apps | Goals | Apps | Goals | Apps | Goals | Apps | Goals |
|---|---|---|---|---|---|---|---|---|---|---|---|---|
| Nice B | 2017–18 | National 2 | 12 | 8 | — | | — | | — | | 13 | 8 |
| Nice B | 2018–19 | National 2 | 1 | 1 | — | | — | | — | | 1 | 1 |
| Nice B | Total | | 13 | 9 | — | | — | | — | | 13 | 9 |
| Nice | 2017–18 | Ligue 1 | 6 | 1 | 1 | 0 | 1 | 0 | 3 (Note: One appearance in UEFA Champions League, two in UEFA Europa League) | 0 | 11 | 1 |
| Nice | 2018–19 | Ligue 1 | 20 | 2 | 1 | 0 | 1 | 0 | — | | 22 | 2 |
| Nice | 2019–20 | Ligue 1 | 26 | 3 | 2 | 1 | 1 | 0 | — | | 29 | 4 |
| Nice | Total | | 52 | 6 | 4 | 1 | 3 | 0 | 3 | 0 | 62 | 7 |
| Lens | 2020–21 | Ligue 1 | 24 | 7 | 0 | 0 | — | | — | | 24 | 7 |
| Lens | 2021–22 | Ligue 1 | 28 | 5 | 1 | 1 | — | | — | | 29 | 6 |
| Lens | 2022–23 | Ligue 1 | 4 | 0 | 0 | 0 | — | | — | | 4 | 0 |
| Lens | Total | | 56 | 12 | 1 | 1 | — | | — | | 57 | 13 |
| Nantes | 2022–23 | Ligue 1 | 28 | 5 | 5 | 0 | — | | 6 (Note: Appearances in UEFA Europa League) | 1 | 39 | 6 |
| Nantes | 2023–24 | Ligue 1 | 6 | 0 | 0 | 0 | — | | — | | 6 | 0 |
| Nantes | 2024–25 | Ligue 1 | 11 | 0 | 1 | 0 | — | | — | | 12 | 0 |
| Nantes | 2025–26 | Ligue 1 | 12 | 3 | 1 | 0 | — | | — | | 13 | 3 |
| Nantes | Total | | 57 | 8 | 7 | 0 | — | | 6 | 1 | 70 | 9 |
| New England Revolution (loan) | 2025 | MLS | 15 | 1 | 0 | 0 | — | | — | | 15 | 1 |
| Career total | | | 194 | 36 | 12 | 2 | 3 | 0 | 9 | 1 | 218 | 39 |

=== International ===
As of match played 19 March 2025

Appearances and goals by national team and year
| National team | Year | Apps | Goals |
|---|---|---|---|
| Cameroon | 2019 | 3 | 0 |
| Cameroon | 2021 | 4 | 0 |
| Cameroon | 2022 | 4 | 0 |
| Cameroon | 2023 | 3 | 0 |
| Cameroon | 2025 | 1 | 0 |
| Total | | 15 | 0 |

== Honours ==
Cameroon

- Africa Cup of Nations bronze: 2021
