= Patrick Burner =

Martiniquais footballer (born 1996)

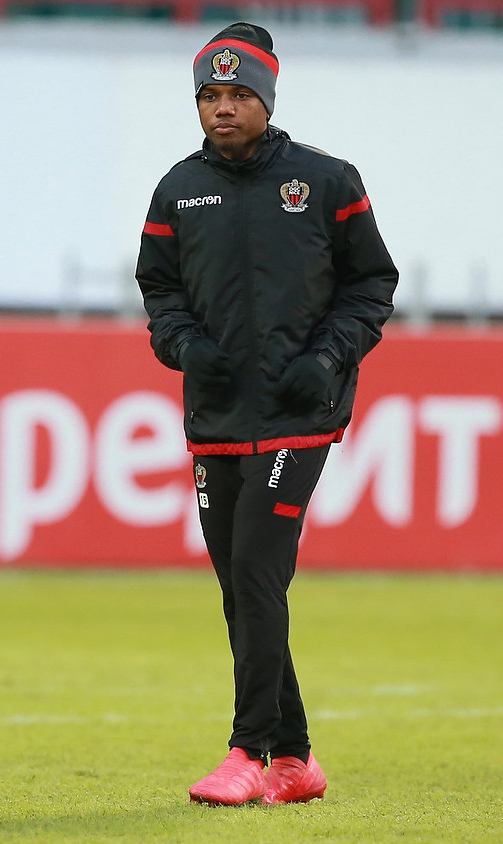
- Burner with Nice in 2018

Personal information
- Date of birth: 11 April 1996 (age 30)
- Place of birth: Fort-de-France, Martinique
- Height: 1.68 m (5 ft 6 in)
- Position: Full-back

Team information
- Current team: Colorado Springs Switchbacks
- Number: 97

Youth career
- Golden Star de Fort-de-France
- Fréjus-Saint-Raphaël
- Nice

Senior career*
Years	Team	Apps	(Gls)
2014–2018	Nice B	54	(3)
2016–2020	Nice	56	(1)
2020–2024	Nîmes	107	(2)
2025	North Carolina FC	22	(0)
2026–	Colorado Springs Switchbacks	21	(0)

International career^{‡}
2021–	Martinique	10	(4)
- * Club domestic league appearances and goals as of 19:55, 8 November 2026 (UTC) ‡ National team caps and goals as of 03:35, 5 July 2023 (UTC)

Patrick Burner (born 11 April 1996) is a Martiniquais professional footballer who plays as full-back for Colorado Springs Switchbacks and the Martinique national team.

== Club career ==
=== Early career ===
Born in Fort-de-France in 1996, Burner started playing at local club Golden Star at the age of 6. He arrived in the Paris region of mainland France when he was 15 and played for the Fréjus-Saint-Raphaël youth team at the age of 16 before joining Nice's training centre at 17.

=== Nice ===
In 2016, Burner was called up to the Nice first team. On 8 December 2016, the 6th matchday of 2016–17 UEFA Europa League, he made his senior team debut against Krasnodar at the Allianz Riviera, playing the full match. On 21 December 2016, Burner made his Ligue 1 debut in a draw against Bordeaux and played the full 90 minutes.

=== Nîmes ===
On 25 September 2020, Burner signed a four-year contract with Nîmes. The transfer fee paid to Nice was reported as €1.5 million.

== Career with Martinique regional team ==
Burner was called up to represent Martinique team at the 2021 CONCACAF Gold Cup. He debuted in a 4–1 Gold Cup loss to Canada on 11 July 2021.

== Career statistics ==
=== Club ===
As of match played 26 May 2023

Appearances and goals by club, season and competition
Club	Season	League			National cup		League cup		Continental		Total	
Club	Season	Division	Apps	Goals	Apps	Goals	Apps	Goals	Apps	Goals	Apps	Goals
Nice B	2013–14	CFA	3	0	—		—		—		3	0
Nice B	2014–15	CFA	6	0	—		—		—		6	0
Nice B	2015–16	CFA	24	1	—		—		—		24	1
Nice B	2016–17	CFA	14	2	—		—		—		14	2
Nice B	2017–18	National 2	5	0	—		—		—		5	0
Nice B	2018–19	National 2	2	0	—		—		—		2	0
Nice B	Total		54	3	—		—		—		54	3
Nice	2016–17	Ligue 1	4	0	1	0	1	0	1	0	7	0
Nice	2017–18	Ligue 1	13	0	1	0	2	0	6	0	22	0
Nice	2018–19	Ligue 1	18	0	1	0	2	0	0	0	21	0
Nice	2019–20	Ligue 1	20	1	1	0	1	0	0	0	22	1
Nice	2020–21	Ligue 1	1	0	0	0	—		0	0	1	0
Nice	Total		56	1	4	0	6	0	7	0	73	1
Nîmes	2020–21	Ligue 1	22	0	1	0	—		—		23	0
Nîmes	2021–22	Ligue 2	30	0	3	0	—		—		33	0
Nîmes	2022–23	Ligue 2	33	0	2	0	—		—		35	0
Nîmes	Total		85	0	6	0	—		—		91	0
Career total			195	4	10	0	6	0	7	0	218	4

=== International ===
As of match played 21 March 2025

Appearances and goals by national team and year
National team	Year	Apps	Goals
Martinique	2021	3	0
Martinique	2022	1	0
Martinique	2023	7	4
Martinique	2024	4	0
Martinique	2025	1	0
Total		16	4

Scores and results list Martinique's goal tally first, score column indicates score after each Burner goal.

List of international goals scored by Patrick Burner
No.	Date	Venue	Opponent	Score	Result	Competition	Ref.
1	16 June 2023	DRV PNK Stadium, Fort Lauderdale, United States	Saint Lucia	3–1	3–1	2023 CONCACAF Gold Cup qualification	
2	26 June 2023	DRV PNK Stadium, Fort Lauderdale, United States	El Salvador	1–0	2–1	2023 CONCACAF Gold Cup	
3	4 July 2023	Red Bull Arena, Harrison, United States	Costa Rica	1–1	4–6	2023 CONCACAF Gold Cup	
4	4 July 2023	Red Bull Arena, Harrison, United States	Costa Rica	2–1	4–6	2023 CONCACAF Gold Cup	
