= Assil Jaziri =

Tunisian footballer (born 1999)

Personal information
- Date of birth: 3 August 1999 (age 27)
- Place of birth: Msaken, Tunisia
- Height: 1.75 m (5 ft 9 in)
- Position: Attacking midfielder

Team information
- Current team: JS El Omrane

Senior career*
Years	Team	Apps	(Gls)
2017–	Nice II	30	(5)
2019–2020	Nice	3	(0)
2022–2025	ES Sahel	30	(4)
2025–	JS El Omrane	10	(0)

International career^{‡}
2018	Tunisia U21	1	(0)
2019–	Tunisia	1	(0)
- * Club domestic league appearances and goals as of 26 July 2025 @ 13:45(AEST) ‡ National team caps and goals as of 7 June 2019

Assil Jaziri (born 3 August 1999) is a Tunisian professional footballer who plays as an attacking midfielder for JS El Omrane.

== Club career ==
Jaziri made his professional debut for Nice in a 1–0 Ligue 1 win over Dijon FCO on 31 March 2019.

== International career ==
Jaziri debuted for the Tunisia U21 in a friendly 2–0 loss to the Italy U21s on 15 October 2018.

He made his debut for Tunisia national football team on 7 June 2019 in a friendly against Iraq, as a 71st-minute substitute for Bassem Srarfi.
