= Bassem Srarfi =

Tunisian footballer

Personal information
- Date of birth: 25 June 1997 (age 29)
- Place of birth: Tunis, Tunisia
- Height: 1.76 m (5 ft 9 in)
- Position: Winger

Team information
- Current team: Club Africain
- Number: 19

Youth career
- Stade Tunisien
- 2014–2015: Club Africain

Senior career*
Years	Team	Apps	(Gls)
2015–2017	Club Africain	26	(6)
2017–2020	Nice	56	(4)
2017	Nice II	4	(1)
2020–2022	Zulte Waregem	36	(0)
2023	Al-Arabi	0	(0)
2023–	Club Africain	49	(4)

International career^{‡}
2018–	Tunisia	15	(1)
- * Club domestic league appearances and goals as of 18 July 2026 ‡ National team caps and goals as of 13 March 2020 (UTC)

Bassem Srarfi (Arabic: بسام الصرارفي; born 25 June 1997) is a Tunisian professional footballer who plays as a winger for Tunisian club Club Africain and the Tunisia national team.

== Club career ==
=== Early career ===
Srarfi started in the youth ranks of Tunisian clubs Stade Tunisien and Club Africain respectively, he subsequently made his first-team debut for the latter on 20 November 2015 in a Tunisian Ligue Professionnelle 1 draw against EGS Gafsa. Three games later, Srarfi scored his first professional goal in a 2–2 draw away to Hammam-Lif.

=== Nice ===
On 1 February 2017, Srarfi joined Ligue 1 side Nice. The transfer was subject to international clearance, but it was successfully approved hours later by the French Football Federation and Tunisian Football Federation. He made his Nice debut on 24 February in Ligue 1 against Montpellier. He has also featured for Nice II in the Championnat National 2. His first goal in French football came for Nice II, in a loss to Stade Montois on 28 October.

On 29 November 2017, he scored his first goal for Nice's first team in Ligue 1, helping his team to a 2–1 win against Toulouse in stoppage time.

=== Zulte Waregem ===
In January 2020, Srarfi completed a transfer to Belgian First Division A outfit Zulte Waregem. His contract with Zulte Waregem was terminated by mutual consent in the summer of 2022.

== International career ==
Srarfi received his first call-up for the Tunisia national team in August 2017, with Nabil Maâloul selecting him in the squad for the 2018 FIFA World Cup qualifiers versus DR Congo. He was an unused substitute in both fixtures. Srarfi made his senior debut for Tunisia in a 1–0 friendly win over Iran on 23 March 2018. In the following May, he was named in Tunisia's preliminary squad for the 2018 FIFA World Cup. He was selected in the final 23. He made his World Cup debut on 28 June, as Tunisia exited the tournament with victory versus Panama. Srarfi made Alain Giresse's squad for the 2019 Africa Cup of Nations.

== Career statistics ==
=== Club ===
As of 17 June 2019

Appearances and goals by club, season and competition
Club	Season	League			National cup		League cup		Continental		Other		Total	
Club	Season	Division	Apps	Goals	Apps	Goals	Apps	Goals	Apps	Goals	Apps	Goals	Apps	Goals
Club Africain	2015–16	Tunisian Ligue 1	17	3	0	0	—		1 (Note: Appearance(s) in the CAF Champions League)	1	0	0	18	4
Club Africain	2016–17	Tunisian Ligue 1	9	3	1	1	—		0	0	0	0	10	4
Club Africain	Total		26	6	1	1	0	0	1	1	0	0	28	8
Nice	2016–17	French Ligue 1	5	0	—		—		—		0	0	5	0
Nice	2017–18	French Ligue 1	26	3	1	0	2	0	6 (Note: Appearance(s) in the UEFA Champions League and UEFA Europa League)	0	0	0	35	3
Nice	2018–19	French Ligue 1	22	1	1	0	2	0	0	0	0	0	25	1
Nice	2019–20	French Ligue 1	3	0	0	0	1	0	0	0	0	0	4	0
Nice	Total		56	4	2	0	5	0	6	0	0	0	69	4
Nice II	2016–17	National 2	2	0	—		—		—		0	0	2	0
Nice II	2017–18	National 2	2	1	—		—		—		0	0	2	1
Nice II	Total		4	1	0	0	0	0	0	0	0	0	4	1
Zulte Waregem	2019–20	First Division A	4	0	0	0	—		—		0	0	4	0
Career total			90	11	3	1	5	0	7	1	0	0	105	13

=== International ===
As of 13 March 2020

Appearances and goals by national team and year
National team	Year	Apps	Goals
Tunisia	2018	10	0
Tunisia	2019	5	1
Total		15	1

As of 7 June 2019
Scores and results list Tunisia's goal tally first, score column indicates score after each Srarfi goal.

List of international goals scored by Bassem Srarfi
No.	Date	Venue	Opponent	Score	Result	Competition	Ref.
1	7 June 2019	Stade Olympique de Radès, Radès, Tunisia	Iraq	2–0	2–0	Friendly	
