= Jean-Pierre Rivère =

French businessman and football club chairman

Jean-Pierre Rivère (born 2 September 1957 in Condom, Gers) is a French businessman who formerly served as president of football club OGC Nice.

== Career ==
In 1996, Rivère founded Nice Iselection, a realty software firm that was eventually acquired by Nexity in 2007–2008.

In July 2011, Rivère invested €11–12 million in OGC Nice, financing a capital increase that allowed him to acquire 51% of the club's shares through his holding company, Rivère Sports Invest. On July 11, 2011, he became chairman of the board of directors of OGC Nice, replacing Gilbert Stellardo.

On January 11, 2019, Rivère and his right-hand man Julien Fournier announced their departure from the club, citing disagreements with the Chinese shareholders over recruitment strategy. However, following the club's acquisition by British billionaire Jim Ratcliffe, Rivère returned as president on August 29, 2019.

In July 2025, it was announced he would step down as chairman on August 20, with CEO Fabrice Bocquet succeeding him. Rivère will remain involved as Ambassador and President of the OGC Nice Foundation.
