= Racine Coly =

Senegalese footballer

Personal information
- Date of birth: 8 December 1995 (age 30)
- Place of birth: Dakar, Senegal
- Height: 1.85 m (6 ft 1 in)
- Position: Left back

Youth career
- 2012–2014: Brescia

Senior career*
Years	Team	Apps	(Gls)
2014–2017	Brescia	102	(5)
2017–2019	Nice II	5	(0)
2017–2021	Nice	27	(1)
2020	→ Famalicão (loan)	14	(0)
2021	→ Amiens (loan)	15	(0)
2021–2022	Estoril	2	(0)
2023–2025	İstanbulspor	49	(2)

International career
2015	Senegal U20	1	(0)
2019–	Senegal	4	(0)
Medal record
Men's football
Representing Senegal
African U-20 Championship
Silver medal – second place	2015 Senegal
- * Club domestic league appearances and goals as of 15 June 2025

Racine Coly (born 8 December 1995) is a Senegalese professional footballer who plays as a defender.

== Club career ==
On 31 August 2017, Coly joined French Ligue 1 side Nice.

On 26 January 2021, Coly moved to French Ligue 2 club Amiens, on a loan deal until the end of the season.

He transferred to the Primeira Liga club Estoril on 3 June 2021.

On 27 July 2023 he signed with Süper Lig club İstanbulspor.

== International career ==
Coly made one appearance for the Senegal U20s at the 2015 African U-20 Championship in a 2–1 semi-final win over Mali U20 on 19 March 2015.
