= Christophe Jallet =

French footballer (born 1983)

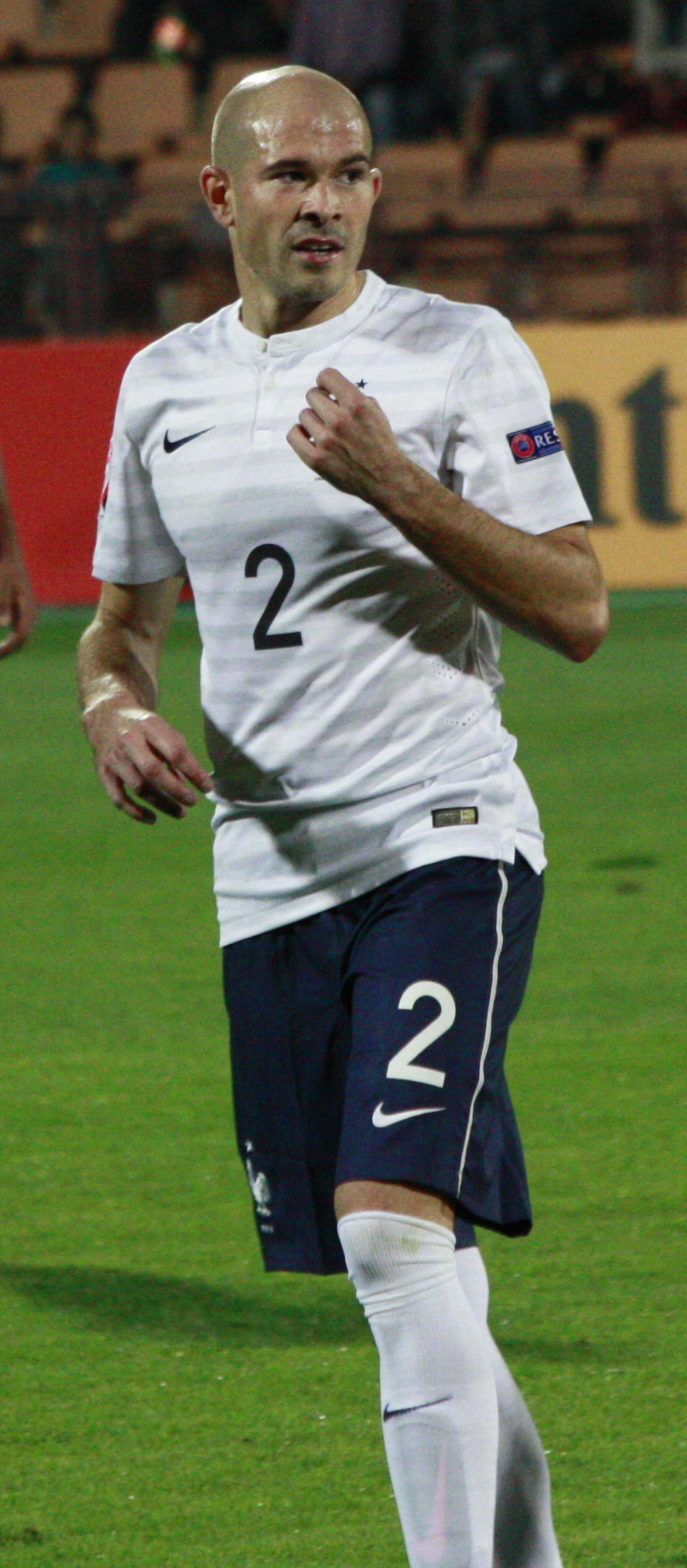
- Jallet playing for France in 2014

Personal information
- Full name: Christophe Jean-Pierre Jallet
- Date of birth: 31 October 1983 (age 43)
- Place of birth: Cognac, Charente, France
- Height: 1.78 m (5 ft 10 in)
- Position: Right back

Youth career
- 1992–1998: Cognac
- 1998–2003: Niort

Senior career*
Years	Team	Apps	(Gls)
2003–2006	Niort	98	(12)
2006–2009	Lorient	97	(3)
2009–2014	Paris Saint-Germain	143	(7)
2014–2017	Lyon	68	(3)
2017–2019	Nice	29	(1)
2019–2020	Amiens	12	(1)
Total		447	(27)

International career
2012–2017	France	16	(1)
Medal record
Men's football
Representing France
UEFA European Championship
Runner-up	2016 France
- * Club domestic league appearances and goals

Christophe Jean-Pierre Jallet (French: [kʁistɔf ʒalɛ]; born 31 October 1983) is a French former professional footballer who played as a right back. During his career, he played for Niort, Lorient, Paris Saint-Germain, Lyon, Nice and Amiens, as well as registering 16 caps for the France national team between 2012 and 2017.

== Club career ==
=== Early career ===
Born in Cognac, Charente, Jallet began his career at his hometown club UA Cognac where he operated behind the striker. Tracked by the main club in the region, Niort, since 13, he was discouraged by his parents to pursue the move and he remained in Cognac.

=== Niort ===
Jallet finally joined Niort at 15, but his coach told his parents that he was "not good enough." Jallet dramatically improved after this. Following his training, he started numerous games in National and Ligue 2 during his three seasons as a defensive midfielder there.

=== Lorient ===
In 2006, Jallet was transferred to FC Lorient, where he played as the side's third-choice right-back. After a successful tutelage as third-choice, Jallet eventually became a stalwart of the team.

=== Paris Saint-Germain ===
On 6 July 2009, Jallet joined Paris Saint-Germain for a transfer fee of 2.5 million euros, signing a four-year contract. He was recruited to provide competition for Ceará at right-back. Jallet made his first appearance in a competitive match with PSG against Le Mans in the second matchday of the 2009–10 Ligue 1 season. Playing as a right midfielder, he scored his first goal one week later against Valenciennes with an assist from Stéphane Sessègnon. During the next match, against Lille, he delivered an assist a few minutes after he was substituted onto the pitch and marked the very end of game again with a goal. During his first season, Jallet's impact as a substitute with goalscoring potential was highly valued, though gaining a starting berth proved hard with the form of Ceará. Jallet scored again at the 19th match against Grenoble, leading to a 4–0 victory for PSG. He ended the season with 11 assists.

On 1 May 2010, at the Stade de France, Jallet won the Coupe de France with PSG after a 1–0 defeat of Monaco in the final.

On 22 April 2011, he renewed his two-year contract with Paris Saint-Germain.

On 2 October 2011, in the clash between PSG and Lyon, Jallet scored the second goal in a 2–0 victory with an assist from Nenê. He gained the confidence of new coach Carlo Ancelotti in a new position as midfielder, with Ancelotti preferring Milan Biševac at right-back. Jallet gained the captaincy late in the season following the dropping of Mamadou Sakho.

"Jallet is a player with great regularity. There is no tactical error, he is always focused, dynamic. I did not know Jallet but his performance has always been good. He is very professional. I think Jallet can be a good player for the national team." Carlo Ancelotti

=== Lyon ===
On 24 July 2014, Jallet signed a three-year deal with Olympique Lyonnais.

=== Nice ===
On 18 July 2017, Jallet signed with OGC Nice on a free transfer.

=== Amiens ===
On 23 July 2019, Jallet signed with Amiens.

==== Retirement ====
Jallet retired after the 2019–20 season, despite Amiens offering to extend his contract for another campaign.

== International career ==
Jallet was called up to the France national team by manager Didier Deschamps for a friendly against Uruguay on 9 August 2012. In his second appearance, on 11 September 2012, he scored a goal against Belarus from a difficult angle. He played a total of 16 matches for the France national team.

=== International goals ===
#	Date	Venue	Opponent	Score	Result	Competition
1	11 September 2012	Stade de France, Saint-Denis, France	Belarus	2–0	3–1	2014 FIFA World Cup qualification

== Honours ==
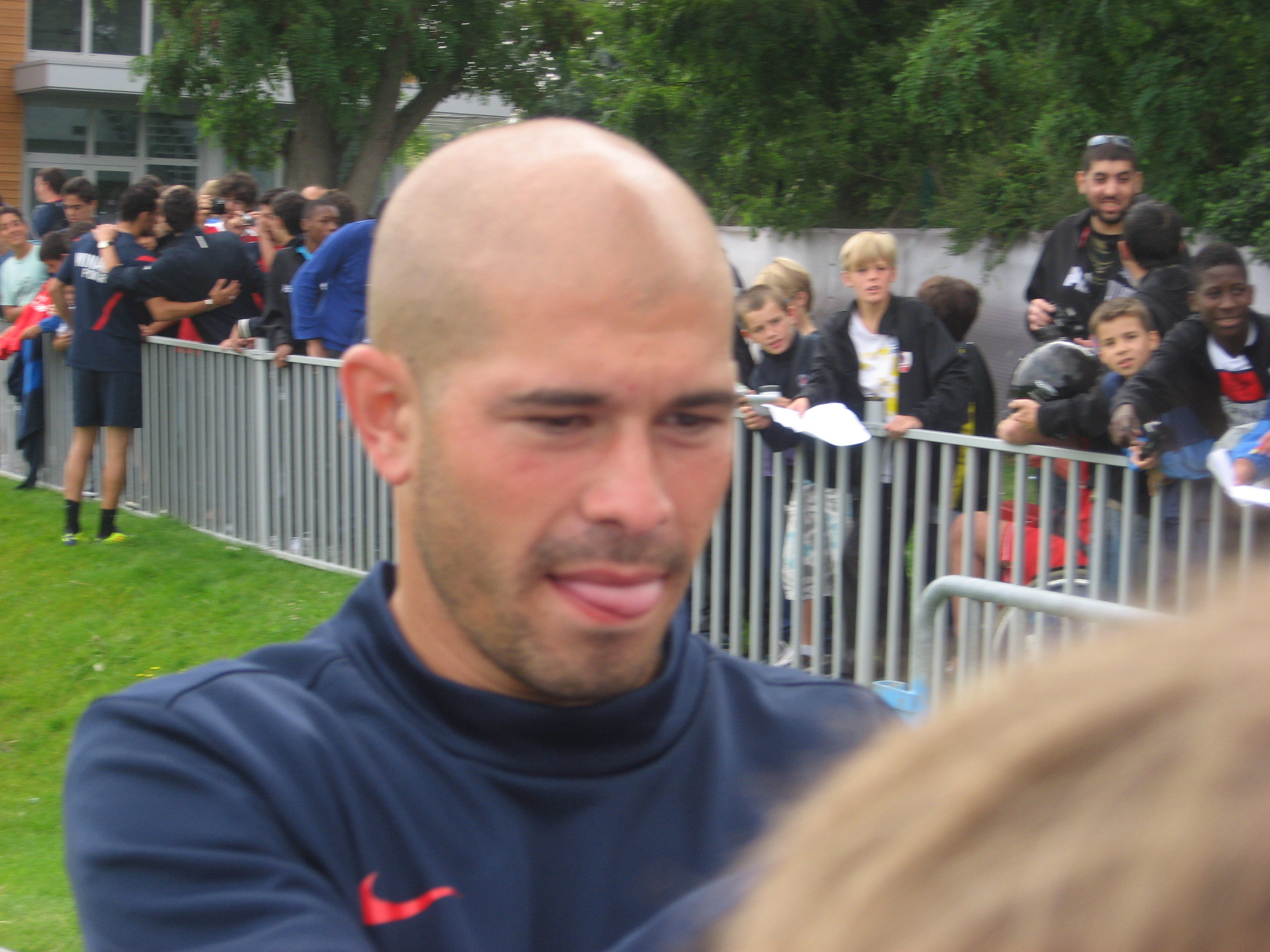
Jallet in 2011

Niort

- Championnat National: 2005–06

Paris Saint-Germain

- Ligue 1: 2012–13, 2013–14
- Coupe de France: 2009–10
- Coupe de la Ligue: 2013–14
- Trophée des Champions: 2013

Individual

- Ligue 1 Team of the Year: 2012–13, 2014–15
