= 2015–16 OGC Nice season =

Nice
2015–16 season
- Chairman: Jean-Pierre Rivère
- Manager: Claude Puel
- Stadium: Allianz Riviera
- Ligue 1: 4th
- Coupe de France: Round of 64
- Coupe de la Ligue: Round of 16
- Top goalscorer: League: Hatem Ben Arfa (17); All: Hatem Ben Arfa (19)
- Highest home attendance: 31,008 vs Paris Saint-Germain (4 December 2015)
- Lowest home attendance: 7,749 vs Rennes (4 January 2016)
Home colours	Away colours	Third colours

The 2015–16 OGC Nice season was the 111th professional season of the club since its creation in 1904.

== Players ==
=== First team squad ===
Note: Flags indicate national team as defined under FIFA eligibility rules; some limited exceptions apply. Players may hold more than one non-FIFA nationality.

No.	Pos.	Nation	Player
1	GK	FRA	Mouez Hassen
3	DF	FRA	Gautier Lloris
4	DF	FRA	Paul Baysse (on loan from Saint-Étienne)
5	DF	FRA	Kévin Gomis
6	MF	CIV	Jean Seri
8	MF	MLI	Mahamane Traoré
9	MF	FRA	Hatem Ben Arfa
10	FW	FRA	Mickaël Le Bihan
12	MF	FRA	Albert Rafetraniaina
13	MF	SWE	Niklas Hult
14	FW	FRA	Alassane Pléa
15	FW	FRA	Alexandre Mendy
16	GK	FRA	Simon Pouplin

No.	Pos.	Nation	Player
18	MF	FRA	Remi Walter
19	MF	BRA	Wallyson Mallmann (on loan from Sporting CP)
20	DF	FRA	Maxime Le Marchand
21	MF	MAD	Stéphan Raheriharimanana
23	DF	POR	Ricardo (on loan from Porto)
24	DF	FRA	Mathieu Bodmer
25	DF	HAI	Romain Genevois
26	MF	FRA	Vincent Koziello
28	FW	FRA	Valère Germain (on loan from Monaco)
29	DF	FRA	Jérémy Pied
30	GK	FRA	Yoan Cardinale
34	DF	FRA	Jonathan Correia Da Fonseca

=== Out on loan ===
Note: Flags indicate national team as defined under FIFA eligibility rules; some limited exceptions apply. Players may hold more than one non-FIFA nationality.

No.	Pos.	Nation	Player
—	DF	FRA	Lucas Rougeaux (on loan to Boulogne)
—	MF	BEL	Julien Vercauteren (on loan to Westerlo)
—	MF	FRA	Valentin Eysseric (on loan to Saint-Étienne)

No.	Pos.	Nation	Player
—	FW	ALG	Saïd Benrahma (on loan to Angers)
—	FW	FRA	Alexy Bosetti (on loan to Tours)
—	FW	FRA	Bryan Constant (on loan to Fréjus Saint-Raphaël)

== Transfers ==
=== Transfers in ===
Date	Pos.	Player	Age	Moved from	Fee	Notes
1 July 2015	MF	(France) Hatem Ben Arfa	27	Unattached	Free Transfer	
1 July 2015	DF	(France) Maxime Le Marchand	25	(France) Le Havre	Undisclosed	
1 July 2015	MF	(Ivory Coast) Jean Michaël Seri	23	(Portugal) Paços de Ferreira	Undisclosed	
31 August 2015	FW	(France) Mickaël Le Bihan	25	(France) Le Havre	Undisclosed	
16 January 2016	MF	(France) Rémi Walter	20	(France) Nancy	Undisclosed	

=== Loans in ===
Date	Pos.	Player	Age	Loaned from	Return date	Notes
1 July 2015	FW	(France) Valère Germain	25	(France) Monaco	30 June 2016	
7 August 2015	DF	(France) Paul Baysse	27	(France) Saint-Étienne	30 June 2016	
12 August 2015	MF	(Brazil) Wallyson Mallmann	21	(Portugal) Sporting CP	30 June 2016	
31 August 2015	MF	(Portugal) Ricardo	21	(Portugal) Porto	30 June 2016	

=== Transfers out ===
Date	Pos.	Player	Age	Moved to	Fee	Notes
1 July 2015	MF	(France) Éric Bauthéac	27	(France) Lille	£1,700,000	
1 July 2015	FW	(France) Jordan Astier	23	Unattached	Released	
1 July 2015	FW	(France) Xavier Pentecôte	28	Unattached	Released	
1 July 2015	DF	(Senegal) Souleymane Diawara	36	Unattached	Released	
1 July 2015	DF	(Senegal) Moussa M'Bow	23	Unattached	Released	
1 July 2015	MF	(France) Fabien Dao Castellana	21	Unattached	Released	
3 July 2015	GK	(France) Joris Delle	25	(France) Lens	Undisclosed	
8 July 2015	MF	(France) Didier Digard	28	(Spain) Real Betis	Free transfer	
18 July 2015	DF	(France) Jordan Amavi	21	(England) Aston Villa	£7,700,000	
27 July 2015	DF	(Gabon) Lloyd Palun	26	(France) Red Star	Free Transfer	
1 August 2015	DF	(France) Grégoire Puel	23	(France) Le Havre	Free Transfer	
10 August 2015	FW	(France) Neal Maupay	18	(France) Saint-Étienne	Undisclosed	

=== Loans out ===
Date	Pos.	Player	Age	Loaned to	Return date	Notes
15 July 2015	FW	(France) Alexy Bosetti	22	(France) Tours	30 June 2016	
7 August 2015	DF	(France) Lucas Rougeaux	21	(France) Boulogne	30 June 2016	
18 August 2015	MF	(France) Valentin Eysseric	23	(France) Saint-Étienne	30 June 2016	
11 January 2016	FW	(France) Saïd Benrahma	20	(France) Angers	30 June 2016	
13 January 2016	MF	(Belgium) Julien Vercauteren	23	(Belgium) Westerlo	30 June 2016	
20 January 2016	MF	(France) Bryan Constant	21	(France) Fréjus Saint-Raphaël	30 June 2016	
25 January 2016	DF	(France) Albert Rafetraniaina	19	(France) Red Star	30 June 2016	
25 January 2016	FW	(France) Alexy Bosetti	21	(Norway) Sarpsborg 08	30 June 2016	

== Pre-season & friendlies ==
11 July 2015 Friendly	Lausanne-Sport	1–4	Nice	Montlhéry, France
16:05 CEST (UTC+02:00)	Rushenguziminega 34'	Report	Germain 8', 35'; Pléa 43'; Benrahma 83'	Stadium: Stade d'Honneur Paul Desgouillons

17 July 2015 Friendly	Zulte-Waregem	2–1	Nice	Waregem, Belgium
19:00 CEST (UTC+02:00)	De Ridder 19'; Leye 77'	Report	Germain 37'; Cardinale (red card) 54'	Stadium: Regenboogstadion

21 July 2015 Friendly	Fréjus Saint-Raphaël	0–1	Nice
18:00 CEST (UTC+02:00)		Report	Eysseric 54'

26 July 2015 Friendly	Beşiktaş	2–2	Nice	Gleisdorf, Austria
17:30 CEST (UTC+02:00)	Tosun 61'; Uysal 82'	Report	Pléa 45'; A. Mendy 64'	Stadium: Solarstadion der Stadt

28 July 2015 Friendly	Galatasaray	0–4	Nice	Wolfsberg, Austria
17:15 CEST (UTC+02:00)		Report	Ben Arfa 57' (pen.); Eysseric 71'; Benrahma 73' (pen.); Maupay 80'	Stadium: Lavanttal-Arena

2 August 2015 Friendly	Nice	3–2	Napoli	Nice
20:00 CEST (UTC+02:00)	Pléa 8'; Seri 39'; Germain 53'	Report	Callejón 14', (red card) 68'; Mertens 20'	Stadium: Allianz Riviera

== Competitions ==
=== Ligue 1 ===
==== League table ====
Pos	Team	Pld	W	D	L	GF	GA	GD	Pts	Qualification or relegation
2	Lyon	38	19	8	11	67	43	+24	65	Qualification for the Champions League group stage
3	Monaco	38	17	14	7	57	50	+7	65	Qualification for the Champions League third qualifying round
4	Nice	38	18	9	11	58	41	+17	63	Qualification for the Europa League group stage (Note: Since the winners of the 2015–16 Coupe de France and the 2015–16 Coupe de la Ligue, Paris Saint-Germain, qualified for European competition based on their league position, the spot awarded to the Coupe de France winners (Europa League group stage) was passed to the fourth-placed team and the spot awarded to the Coupe de la Ligue winners (Europa League third qualifying round) was passed to the sixth-placed team. The fifth-placed team received the spot in Europa League third qualifying round originally designated to the fourth-placed team.)
5	Lille	38	15	15	8	39	27	+12	60	Qualification for the Europa League third qualifying round
6	Saint-Étienne	38	17	7	14	42	37	+5	58	Qualification for the Europa League third qualifying round

Source: Ligue 1, Soccerway
Rules for classification: 1) Points; 2) Goal difference; 3) Goals scored; 4) Head-to-head points; 5) Head-to-head goal difference; 6) Fairplay ranking.

==== Results summary ====
Overall								Home						Away					
Pld	W	D	L	GF	GA	GD	Pts	W	D	L	GF	GA	GD	W	D	L	GF	GA	GD
38	18	9	11	58	41	+17	63	12	2	5	32	16	+16	6	7	6	26	25	+1

Last updated: 14 May 2016.
Source: Competitive matches

==== Results by round ====
Round	1	2	3	4	5	6	7	8	9	10	11	12	13	14	15	16	17	18	19	20	21	22	23	24	25	26	27	28	29	30	31	32	33	34	35	36	37	38
Ground	H	A	H	A	H	A	H	A	H	A	A	H	A	H	A	A	H	A	H	A	H	H	A	H	A	H	A	H	H	A	H	A	H	A	H	A	H	A
Result	L	D	W	D	L	W	W	W	L	W	L	D	W	W	L	D	L	D	W	D	W	W	L	W	L	D	D	L	W	W	W	L	W	D	W	L	W	W
Position	16	13	9	11	15	9	8	7	8	5	7	8	6	4	6	5	7	5	5	4	4	3	4	3	3	3	3	5	4	3	3	5	4	4	4	5	4	4

Source: Ligue1
A = Away; H = Home; W = Win; D = Draw; L = Loss

==== Matches ====
Win Draw Loss

8 August 2015 1	Nice	1–2	Monaco	Nice
21:00 CEST (UTC+02:00)	Germain 7'; Boscagli (yellow card) 14' (yellow-red card) 44'; Pléa (yellow card) 39'; Baysse (yellow card) 84'	Report	Kurzawa (yellow card) 41', (goal) 62'; Carvalho (yellow card) 45+3'; Silva 51'	Stadium: Allianz Riviera; Attendance: 25,173; Referee: Lionel Jaffredo

15 August 2015 2	Troyes	3–3	Nice	Troyes
21:00 CEST (UTC+02:00)	Jean 3'; Pereira (yellow card) 4'; Mavinga (yellow card) 12' (yellow-red card) 32'; Court (yellow card) 14'; Camus 77'; Thiago Xavier 90+3', (yellow card) 90+3'	Report	Ben Arfa 6' (pen.), (yellow card) 69'; Pléa 16'; Le Marchand 42'; Correia (yellow card) 45+2'; Rafetraniaina (yellow card) 90+2'	Stadium: Stade de l'Aube; Attendance: 11,468; Referee: Johan Hamel

22 August 2015 3	Nice	2–1	Caen	Nice
20:00 CEST (UTC+02:00)	Ben Arfa 66'; Koziello (yellow card) 71'; Pléa 77'	Report	Nangis (yellow card) 45'; Delort 67'; Seube (yellow card) 72'; Louis (yellow card) 82'	Stadium: Allianz Riviera; Attendance: 15,908; Referee: Jérôme Miguelgorry

29 August 2015 4	Angers	1–1	Nice	Angers
20:00 CEST (UTC+02:00)	Mangani 24'; Andreu (yellow card) 55'; Doré (yellow card) 87'	Report	Germain (yellow card) 22', (goal) 56'; Boscagli (yellow card) 40'	Stadium: Stade Jean-Bouin; Attendance: 13,485; Referee: Stéphane Jochem

12 September 2015 5	Nice	0–1	Guingamp	Nice
20:00 CEST (UTC+02:00)	Koziello (yellow card) 66'	Report	Coco (yellow card) 40'; Benezet (yellow card) 74'; Sankharé 76'; Mathis (yellow card) 87'	Stadium: Allianz Riviera; Attendance: 14,421; Referee: Tony Chapron

19 September 2015 6	Bastia	1–3	Nice	Furiani
20:00 CEST (UTC+02:00)	Danic 24'; Marange (yellow card) 87'	Report	N. Mendy 33'; Germain 40'; Mallmann (yellow card) 85'; Pied (yellow card) 86'; Benrahma 90+4'	Stadium: Stade Armand Cesari; Attendance: 12,945; Referee: Wilfried Bien

23 September 2015 7	Nice	6–1	Bordeaux	Nice
19:00 CEST (UTC+02:00)	Germain 33'; Le Bihan 42'; Pallois 51' (o.g.); Ben Arfa 68', 75'; A. Mendy 84'	Report	Plašil 6'; Khazri (yellow card) 14'; Crivelli (red card) 50'	Stadium: Allianz Riviera; Attendance: 13,686; Referee: Nicolas Rainville

27 September 2015 8	Saint-Étienne	1–4	Nice	Saint-Étienne
21:00 CEST (UTC+02:00)	Perrin 19'; Pajot (yellow card) 50'; Lemoine (yellow card) 63'; Polomat (yellow card) 75'; Eysseric (yellow card) 89'	Report	Koziello 5'; Seri (yellow card) 29', (goal) 53'; Ben Arfa 39', 45+1'; N. Mendy (red card) 62'; Le Marchand (red card) 82'	Stadium: Stade Geoffroy-Guichard; Attendance: 24,556; Referee: Bartolomeu Varela

18 October 2015 10	Rennes	1–4	Nice	Rennes
21:00 CEST (UTC+02:00)	Fernandes (yellow card) 37'; Sio (yellow card) 59'; Grosicki 88'	Report	Bodmer 14'; Germain (yellow card) 52'; Ben Arfa 53'; Traoré (yellow card) 71', (goal) 75'; Benrahma 80'	Stadium: Roazhon Park; Attendance: 21,709; Referee: Benoît Millot

24 October 2015 11	Gazélec Ajaccio	3–1	Nice	Ajaccio, Corsica
18:30 CEST (UTC+02:00)	Pujol 1'; Ducourtioux (yellow card) 22'; Filippi 32'; Coeff (yellow card) 34'; Đoković 43', (yellow card) 48'; Lemoigne (red card) 88'	Report	Filippi 12' (o.g.); Koziello (yellow card) 42'; Mallmann (yellow card) 61'; Bodmer (yellow card) 67'; Boscagli (yellow card) 84'	Stadium: Stade Ange Casanova; Attendance: 3,757; Referee: Johan Hamel

1 November 2015 12	Nice	0–0	Lille	Nice
14:00 CET (UTC+01:00)	Ricardo (yellow card) 11'; Koziello (yellow card) 33'; Honorat (yellow card) 85'	Report	Bauthéac (yellow card) 33'; Soumaoro (yellow card) 41'; Obbadi (yellow card) 63'	Stadium: Allianz Riviera; Attendance: 18,169

4 November 2015 9	Nice	1–2	Nantes	Nice
18:30 CET (UTC+01:00)	Genevois 42'; Pied (yellow card) 67'	Report	Alegue 11'; Vizcarrondo (yellow card) 65'; Thomasson (yellow card) 68'; Sigþórsson 70'; Sabaly (yellow card) 75'	Stadium: Allianz Riviera; Attendance: 17,531; Referee: Sébastien Moreira

8 November 2015 13	Marseille	0–1	Nice	Marseille
17:00 CET (UTC+01:00)	B. Mendy (yellow card) 86'; Sparagna (yellow card) 87'	Report	Germain 16'; Wallyson (yellow card) 20'; Ricardo (yellow card) 68'	Stadium: Stade Vélodrome; Attendance: 47,988; Referee: Antony Gautier

20 November 2015 14	Nice	3–0	Lyon	Nice
20:30 CET (UTC+01:00)	Germain 20'; Genevois (yellow card) 24'; Yanga-Mbiwa 48' (o.g.); Koziello 71'	Report	Ferri (yellow card) 26'; Morel (yellow card) 85'	Stadium: Allianz Riviera; Attendance: 17,872; Referee: Benoît Bastien

28 November 2015 15	Toulouse	2–0	Nice	Toulouse
20:00 CE1T (UTC+01:00)	Somália (yellow card) 15'; Braithwaite 31' (pen.); Ben Yedder 58'; Machach (yellow card) 60'	Report	Hassen (red card) 39'; Pied (yellow card) 60'; Le Marchand (yellow card) 90+2'	Stadium: Stadium Municipal; Attendance: 9,956; Referee: Saïd Ennjimi

1 December 2015 16	Lorient	0–0	Nice	Lorient
19:00 CE1T (UTC+01:00)	Moukandjo (yellow card) 65'; N'Dong (yellow card) 87'	Report	Genevois (yellow card) 36'; Ricardo (yellow card) 38'; Koziello (yellow card) 72'; Le Marchand (yellow card) 77'; Hult (yellow card) 90'	Stadium: Stade du Moustoir; Attendance: 9,218; Referee: Mikaël Lesage

4 December 2015 17	Nice	0–3	Paris Saint-Germain	Nice
20:30 CET (UTC+01:00)	Hult (red card) 43'	Report	Cavani 35'; Matuidi (yellow card) 40'; Ibrahimović 44' (pen.), 61'; Aurier (yellow card) 85'	Stadium: Allianz Riviera; Attendance: 31,008; Referee: Antony Gautier

12 December 2015 18	Stade Reims	1–1	Nice	Reims
16:00 CET (UTC+01:00)	Diego 78'; Devaux (yellow card) 84'; Kankava (yellow card) 90+3'; Mandi (red card) 90+4'	Report	Germain 6'; Pied (yellow card) 30'; Ben Arfa (yellow card) 57'	Stadium: Stade Auguste Delaune; Attendance: 12,536; Referee: Antony Gautier

18 December 2015 19	Nice	1–0	Montpellier	Nice
20:30 CET (UTC+01:00)	Boscagli 31'; Bodmer (yellow card) 42'; A. Mendy (yellow card) 64'	Report	Ninga (yellow card) 7'; Martin (yellow card) 12'	Stadium: Allianz Riviera; Attendance: 14,026; Referee: Tony Chapron

10 January 2016 20	Lille	1–1	Nice	Villeneuve d'Ascq
17:00 CET (UTC+01:00)	Benzia 11'; Corchia (yellow card) 68'; Pavard (yellow card) 90'	Report	Hult 45'; N. Mendy (yellow card) 50'; Mallmann (yellow card) 62'; Seri (yellow card) 72'	Stadium: Stade Pierre-Mauroy; Attendance: 30,238; Referee: Hakim Ben El Hadj

15 January 2016 21	Nice	2–1	Angers	Nice
20:30 CET (UTC+01:00)	Hult (yellow card) 59'; Cardinale (yellow card) 63'; Ben Arfa 80' (pen.), 84' (pen.)	Report	Capelle 24'; Saïss (yellow card) 35'; Ndoye (yellow card) 63'; Manceau (yellow card) 82'	Stadium: Allianz Riviera; Attendance: 13,600; Referee: Jérôme Miguelgorry

23 January 2016 22	Nice	2–1	Lorient	Nice
20:00 CET (UTC+01:00)	Baysse (yellow card) 18'; Ben Arfa 35'; Koziello 44'	Report	Jouffre 24'; Koné (yellow card) 63'; N'Dong (yellow card) 81'	Stadium: Allianz Riviera; Attendance: 13,871; Referee: Stéphane Jochem

31 January 2016 23	Caen	2–0	Nice	Caen
20:00 CET (UTC+01:00)	Rodelin 12'; Delort 41' (pen.); Nkololo (yellow card) 80'	Report	Bodmer (yellow card) 30'; Koziello (yellow card) 90+3'	Stadium: Stade Michel d'Ornano; Attendance: 17,061; Referee: Stéphane Lannoy

3 February 2016 24	Nice	1–0	Toulouse	Nice
19:00 CET (UTC+01:00)	Pied (yellow card) 70'; Ben Arfa 82'	Report	Blin (yellow card) 71'	Stadium: Allianz Riviera; Attendance: 12,828; Referee: François Letexier

6 February 2016 25	Monaco	1–0	Nice	Fontvieille
14:00 CET (UTC+1)	Dirar (yellow card) 48' (yellow-red card) 48'; Bakayoko 81'; Subašić (yellow card) 90+1'; Silva (yellow card) 90+2'; Moutinho (yellow card) 90+4'	Report	Germain (yellow card) 8'; Cardinale (yellow card) 25'; Koziello (yellow card) 44'; Le Marchand (yellow card) 45+1'; Pied (yellow card) 80'; Ricardo (yellow card) 90+3'	Stadium: Stade Louis II; Attendance: 12,842; Referee: Tony Chapron

14 February 2016 26	Nice	1–1	Marseille	Nice
21:00 CET (UTC+01:00)	Germain 58'; Ricardo (yellow card) 86'	Report	Isla 28', (yellow card) 45+7'; Nkoulou (yellow card) 90+1'	Stadium: Allianz Riviera; Attendance: 28,659; Referee: Benoît Millot

19 February 2016 27	Bordeaux	0–0	Nice	Bordeaux
20:30 CET (UTC+01:00)		Report	Koziello (yellow card) 44'; Ranieri (yellow card) 90+1'	Stadium: Nouveau Stade de Bordeaux; Attendance: 23,641; Referee: Nicolas Rainville

26 February 2016 28	Nice	0–2	Bastia	Nice
20:30 CET (UTC+1)	Koziello (yellow card) 17'; Le Marchand (yellow card) 56'; Baysse (red card) 58'; Traoré (yellow card) 67'	Report	Mostefa (yellow card) 25'; Modesto (yellow card) 27'; Cahuzac (yellow card) 57'; Diallo 61'; Ayité 64'; Danic (yellow card) 70'; Djiku (yellow card) 73'	Stadium: Allianz Riviera; Attendance: 14,541; Referee: Antony Gautier

5 March 2016 29	Nice	2–1	Troyes	Nice
20:00 CET (UTC+1)	Germain 12'; Boscagli (yellow card) 56'; Traoré 72'	Report	Jean 27'; Dabo (yellow card) 29'	Stadium: Allianz Riviera; Attendance: 13,160; Referee: Bartolomeu Varela

12 March 2016 30	Montpellier	0–2	Nice	Montpellier
20:00 CET (UTC+01:00)	Martin (yellow card) 81'; Ninga (yellow card) 90+2'	Report	Germain 62'; Pied (yellow card) 64'; Pléa 76'	Stadium: Stade de la Mosson; Attendance: 13,462; Referee: Lionel Jaffredo

20 March 2016 31	Nice	3–0	Gazélec Ajaccio	Nice
20:00 CET (UTC+01:00)	Ben Arfa 14'; Pléa 66'; Pied (yellow card) 70'; Seri 88'	Report	Touré (yellow card) 31'; Lemoigne (yellow card) 62'	Stadium: Allianz Riviera; Attendance: 19,066; Referee: Nicolas Rainville

2 April 2016 32	Paris Saint-Germain	4–1	Nice	Paris
16:00 CEST (UTC+01:00)	Ibrahimović 15', 34', 82'; David Luiz 48'; Silva (yellow card) 68'	Report	Ben Arfa 18'	Stadium: Parc des Princes; Attendance: 46,919; Referee: Mikaël Lesage

10 April 2016 33	Nice	3–0	Rennes	Nice
17:00 CET (UTC+01:00)	Ben Arfa 33' (pen.), 40', 56'	Report		Stadium: Allianz Riviera; Attendance: 23,622; Referee: Clément Turpin

15 April 2016 34	Lyon	1–1	Nice	Lyon
20:30 CET (UTC+1)	Germain 18'	Report	Cornet (red card) 25'; Lacazette (yellow card) 45'	Stadium: Parc Olympique Lyonnais; Attendance: 55,744; Referee: Lionel Jaffredo

22 April 2016 35	Nice	2–0	Reims	Nice
20:30 CET (UTC+01:00)	Germain 11'; Ben Arfa 56' (pen.); Pied (yellow card) 85'	Report	Weber (yellow card) 55'; Turan (yellow card) 58'; Traore (yellow card) 74'	Stadium: Allianz Riviera; Attendance: 21,913; Referee: Benoît Bastien

30 April 2016 36	Nantes	1–0	Nice	Nantes
14:00 CET (UTC+1)	Thomasson 68'; Vizcarrondo (yellow card) 73'	Report	Pied (yellow card) 88'	Stadium: Stade de la Beaujoire; Referee: Antony Gautier

7 May 2016 37	Nice	2–0	Saint-Étienne	Nice
21:00 CET (UTC+01:00)				Stadium: Allianz Riviera

14 May 2016 38	Guingamp	2–3	Nice	Guingamp
21:00 CET (UTC+01:00)				Stadium: Stade du Roudourou

=== Coupe de la Ligue ===
28 October 2015 Round of 32	Caen	1–2	Nice	Caen
CET (UTC+01:00)	Delort 14'; Adéoti (yellow card) 90+1'	Report	A. Mendy 57', 90+2'	Stadium: Stade Michel d'Ornano; Attendance: 10,098; Referee: Stéphane Jochem

15 December 2015 Round of 16	Guingamp	2–2 (a.e.t.) (4–3 p)	Nice	Guingamp
20:00 CET (UTC+01:00)	Angoua (yellow card) 54'; Lemaître (yellow card) 62'; Salibur 89', 110'; Dembélé (yellow card) 93'	Report	Mallmann (yellow card) 24'; A. Mendy 44', 93'; Le Marchand (yellow card) 49'; Baysse (yellow card) 72'; Boscagli (yellow card) 98'; Hult (yellow card) 109'	Stadium: Stade du Roudourou; Attendance: 10,873; Referee: Fredy Fautrel
	Penalties
	De Pauw (penalty scored); Angoua (penalty scored); Sankharé (penalty missed); Dembélé (penalty scored); Lössl (penalty missed); Salibur (penalty scored)		Germain (penalty scored); Ben Arfa (penalty scored); Pied (penalty missed); Seri (penalty scored); Boscagli (penalty missed); Le Marchand (penalty missed)

=== Coupe de France ===
4 January 2016 Round of 64	Nice	2–2 (a.e.t.) (6–7 p)	Rennes	Nice
20:45 CET (UTC+01:00)	A. Mendy 38'; Koziello (yellow card) 41' (yellow-red card) 74'; Ben Arfa 117' (pen.)	Report	Diagne (yellow card) 42'; Pedro Henrique (yellow card) 58'; Fernandes (yellow card) 81'; Boga 83'; André 114'; Armand (yellow card) 119'; Danzé (red card) 116'	Stadium: Allianz Riviera; Attendance: 7,749; Referee: Clément Turpin
	Penalties
	Ben Arfa (penalty scored); Seri (penalty scored); N. Mendy (penalty scored); Wallyson (penalty missed); Baysse (penalty scored); Genevois (penalty scored); Honorat (penalty missed); Boscagli (penalty scored); Lloris (penalty missed)		(penalty missed) Quintero; (penalty scored) Boga; (penalty scored) Diagné; (penalty scored) Dembélé; (penalty scored) Armand; (penalty scored) Janvier; (penalty missed) André; (penalty scored) M'Bengue; (penalty scored) Gelson Fernandes

== Goalscorers ==
Last updated 12 March 2016

Place	Position	Nation	Number	Name	Ligue 1	Coupe de France	Coupe de la Ligue	Total
1	MF	(France)	9	Hatem Ben Arfa	17	2	0	19
2	FW	(France)	28	Valère Germain	14	0	0	14
3	FW	(France)	15	Alexandre Mendy	1	1	4	6
				Own goals	3	0	0	3
4	MF	(France)	26	Vincent Koziello	3	0	0	3
4	FW	(France)	14	Alassane Pléa	3	0	0	3
5	FW	(Algeria)	11	Saïd Benrahma	2	0	0	2
5	MF	(Mali)	8	Mahamane Traoré	2	0	0	2
6	MF	(Ivory Coast)	6	Jean Michaël Seri	1	0	0	1
6	FW	(France)	10	Mickaël Le Bihan	1	0	0	1
6	DF	(France)	20	Maxime Le Marchand	1	0	0	1
6	MF	(France)	22	Nampalys Mendy	1	0	0	1
6	DF	(France)	24	Mathieu Bodmer	1	0	0	1
6	DF	(Haiti)	25	Romain Genevois	1	0	0	1
6	DF	(France)	33	Olivier Boscagli	1	0	0	1
6	MF	(Sweden)	13	Niklas Hult	1	0	0	1
				TOTALS	43	2	4	49
