= 2016–17 OGC Nice season =

Nice
2016–17 season
- Chairman: Jean-Pierre Rivère
- Manager: Lucien Favre
- Stadium: Allianz Riviera
- Ligue 1: 3rd
- Coupe de France: Round of 64
- Coupe de la Ligue: Round of 16
- UEFA Europa League: Group stage
- Top goalscorer: League: Mario Balotelli (15); All: Mario Balotelli (17)
Home colours	Away colours	Third colours

The 2016–17 OGC Nice season was the 112th professional season of the club since its creation in 1904.

== Players ==
=== Squad information ===
Players and squad numbers last updated on 20 August 2016.
Note: Flags indicate national team as has been defined under FIFA eligibility rules. Players may hold more than one non-FIFA nationality.

No.	Name	Nat.	Position(s)	Date of birth (age)	Signed in	Contract until	Signed from
Goalkeepers
1	Mouez Hassen	(Tunisia)	GK	5 March 1995 (age 31)	2013	2017	Youth academy
16	Simon Pouplin	(France)	GK	28 May 1985 (age 41)	2014	2018	(France) Sochaux
30	Yoan Cardinale	(France)	GK	27 March 1994 (age 32)	2015	2017	Youth academy
40	Walter Benítez	(Argentina)	GK	19 March 1993 (age 33)	2016		(Argentina) Quilmes
Defenders
2	Arnaud Souquet	(France)	RB	12 February 1992 (age 34)	2016		(France) Dijon
3	Gautier Lloris	(France)	CB	18 July 1995 (age 31)	2016	2017	Youth academy
4	Paul Baysse	(France)	CB / RB	18 May 1988 (age 38)	2015	2018	(France) Saint-Étienne
15	Patrick Burner	(France)	RB / LB	11 April 1996 (age 30)	2016	2019	Youth academy
20	Maxime Le Marchand	(France)	CB / LB	11 October 1989 (age 37)	2015	2018	(France) Le Havre
21	Ricardo	(Portugal)	RB	6 October 1993 (age 33)	2015	2017	(Portugal) Porto
24	Mathieu Bodmer	(France)	CB	22 November 1982 (age 43)	2013	2017	(France) Paris Saint-Germain
28	Olivier Boscagli	(France)	CB	18 November 1997 (age 28)	2015		Youth academy
29	Dalbert	(Brazil)	LB	8 September 1993 (age 33)	2016		(Portugal) Vitória de Guimarães
31	Dante	(Brazil)	CB / LB	18 April 1983 (age 43)	2016		(Germany) VfL Wolfsburg
32	Malang Sarr	(France)	CB	23 January 1999 (age 27)	2016		Youth academy
Midfielders
5	Younès Belhanda	(Morocco)	AM	25 February 1990 (age 36)	2016	2017	(Ukraine) Dynamo Kyiv
6	Jean Michaël Seri	(Ivory Coast)	CM	19 July 1991 (age 35)	2015	2019	(Portugal) Paços de Ferreira
7	Julien Vercauteren	(Belgium)	RW	12 January 1993 (age 33)	2014	2018	(Belgium) Lierse
8	Arnaud Lusamba	(France)	AM	4 January 1997 (age 29)	2016		(France) Nancy
12	Albert Rafetraniaina	(Madagascar)	DM	9 September 1996 (age 30)	2012		Youth academy
13	Valentin Eysseric	(France)	CAM	25 March 1992 (age 34)	2013	2017	(France) Monaco
18	Rémi Walter	(France)	DM	26 April 1995 (age 31)	2016	2019	(France) Nancy
25	Wylan Cyprien	(France)	CM	28 January 1995 (age 31)	2016		(France) Lens
26	Vincent Koziello	(France)	CM	28 October 1995 (age 31)	2014	2018	Youth academy
33	Vincent Marcel	(France)	RW	9 April 1997 (age 29)	2015		Youth academy
Forwards
9	Mario Balotelli	(Italy)	ST	12 August 1990 (age 36)	2016	2017	(England) Liverpool
10	Mickaël Le Bihan	(France)	CF	16 May 1990 (age 36)	2015		(France) Le Havre
11	Saïd Benrahma	(Algeria)	RW / CF	10 August 1995 (age 31)	2013	2018	Youth academy
14	Alassane Pléa	(France)	CF / RW	10 March 1993 (age 33)	2014	2018	(France) Lyon
19	Bryan Constant	(France)	CF / AM	27 March 1994 (age 32)	2013	2017	Youth academy
22	Anastasios Donis	(Greece)	SS / LW / RW	29 August 1996 (age 30)	2016	2017	(Italy) Juventus
23	Alexy Bosetti	(France)	CF	23 April 1993 (age 33)	2012	2017	Youth academy
27	Dorian Caddy	(France)	CF	20 March 1995 (age 31)	2016	2019	Youth academy

== Transfers ==
=== In ===
Date	Pos.	Player	Age	Moving from	Fee	Notes	Source
13 July 2016	DF	(Brazil) Dalbert	22	(Portugal) Vitória de Guimarães			
19 July 2016	MF	(France) Arnaud Lusamba	19	(France) Nancy	€2,500,000		
25 July 2016	MF	(France) Arnaud Souquet	24	(France) Dijon			
27 July 2016	MF	(France) Wylan Cyprien	21	(France) Lens			
22 August 2016	DF	(Brazil) Dante	32	(Germany) VfL Wolfsburg			
31 August 2016	FW	(Italy) Mario Balotelli	26	(England) Liverpool	Free	One-year contract	
31 August 2016	MF	(Morocco) Younès Belhanda	26	(Ukraine) Dynamo Kyiv		Loan, with option to buy	

=== Out ===
Date	Pos.	Player	Age	Moving to	Fee	Notes	Source
21 June 2016	FW	(France) Alexandre Mendy	22	(France) Guingamp			
30 June 2016	MF	(Sweden) Niklas Hult	22	(Greece) Panathinaikos			
1 July 2016	FW	(France) Hatem Ben Arfa	29	(France) Paris Saint-Germain	Free		
3 July 2016	MF	(France) Nampalys Mendy	24	(England) Leicester City	£13,000,000		
19 August 2016	DF	(France) Kévin Gomis	27	(Scotland) Dundee			

== Pre-season and friendlies ==
Pre-season preparations began on 29 June, with new manager Lucien Favre taking charge. The first ten days were spent in Fontenay-le-Comte before moving to Divonne-les-Bains, where they played their first friendly against Servette. Following the match, the team moved to Nice for the remainder of the pre-season.

16 July 2016 Friendly	Servette	1–1	Nice	Divonne-les-Bains, France
	Vitkieviez 12'	Report	Pléa 6'	Stadium: Stade Municipal

22 July 2016 Friendly	Étoile du Sahel	2–1	Nice	Sousse, Tunisia
	Akaïchi 14'; Brigui 76'	Report	Marcel 62'	Stadium: Stade Olympique

29 July 2016 Friendly	Nice	1–2	Toulouse	Nice
	Bosetti 74'	Report	Trejo 68'; Braithwaite 76'	Stadium: Stade Charles-Ehrmann; Attendance: 2,000; Referee: Karim Abed

1 August 2016 Friendly	Napoli	3–0	Nice	Naples, Italy
	Koulibaly 9', 26'; Mertens 24'	Report		Stadium: Stadio San Paolo; Attendance: 35,000; Referee: Carmine Russo (Italy)

5 August 2016 Friendly	Sporting CP	0–0	Nice	Faro, Portugal
		Report		Stadium: Estádio Algarve; Attendance: 5,000; Referee: Luís Godinho (Portugal)

== Competitions ==
=== Overall ===
Competition	Started round	Final position	First match	Last match
Ligue 1	Matchday 1	3rd	12 August 2016	20 May 2017
Coupe de France	Round of 64		8 January 2017	
Coupe de la Ligue	Round of 16		14 December 2016	
UEFA Europa League	Group stage		15 September 2016	8 December 2016

=== Ligue 1 ===
==== League table ====
Pos	Team	Pld	W	D	L	GF	GA	GD	Pts	Qualification or relegation
1	Monaco (C)	38	30	5	3	107	31	+76	95	Qualification for the Champions League group stage
2	Paris Saint-Germain	38	27	6	5	83	27	+56	87	Qualification for the Champions League group stage
3	Nice	38	22	12	4	63	36	+27	78	Qualification for the Champions League third qualifying round
4	Lyon	38	21	4	13	77	48	+29	67	Qualification for the Europa League group stage (Note: Since the winners of the 2016–17 Coupe de France and the 2016–17 Coupe de la Ligue, Paris Saint-Germain, qualified for European competition based on league position, the spot awarded to the Coupe de France winners (Europa League group stage) was passed to the fourth-placed team and the spot awarded to the Coupe de la Ligue winners (Europa League third qualifying round) was passed to the sixth-placed team. The fifth-placed team received the spot in Europa League third qualifying round originally designated to the fourth-placed team.)
5	Marseille	38	17	11	10	57	41	+16	62	Qualification for the Europa League third qualifying round

Source: Ligue 1, Soccerway
Rules for classification: 1) Points; 2) Goal difference; 3) Goals scored; 4) Head-to-head goal difference; 5) Fairplay ranking.
(C) Champions

==== Results summary ====
Overall								Home						Away					
Pld	W	D	L	GF	GA	GD	Pts	W	D	L	GF	GA	GD	W	D	L	GF	GA	GD
38	22	12	4	63	36	+27	78	13	4	1	39	16	+23	9	8	3	24	20	+4

Source: Competitive matches

==== Results by round ====
Round	1	2	3	4	5	6	7	8	9	10	11	12	13	14	15	16	17	18	19	20	21	22	23	24	25	26	27	28	29	30	31	32	33	34	35	36	37	38
Ground	H	A	H	H	A	H	A	H	H	A	H	A	H	H	A	H	A	H	A	H	A	H	A	H	A	A	H	A	H	A	H	A	H	A	H	A	H	A
Result	W	W	D	W	D	W	W	W	W	W	W	L	W	D	W	W	D	W	D	D	D	W	L	W	D	W	W	W	D	D	W	W	W	D	W	L	L	D
Position	4	3	3	2	2	1	1	1	1	1	1	1	1	1	1	1	1	1	1	2	2	2	2	2	2	2	2	2	3	3	3	3	3	3	3	3	3	3

Source: Competitive matches
A = Away; H = Home; W = Win; D = Draw; L = Loss

==== Matches ====
14 August 2016 1	Nice	1–0	Rennes	Nice
17:00	Sarr 60'	Report	Mendes (yellow card) 32'	Stadium: Allianz Riviera; Attendance: 19,075; Referee: Antony Gautier

20 August 2016 2	Angers	0–1	Nice	Angers
20:00	Bourillon (yellow card) 16'	Report	Pléa 4'; Dalbert (yellow card) 49'; Ricardo (yellow card) 78'	Stadium: Stade Jean-Bouin; Attendance: 10,142; Referee: Jérôme Miguelgorry

27 August 2016 3	Nice	1–1	Lille	Nice
20:00	Koziello 3'; Dalbert (yellow card) 49'; Bodmer (yellow card) 62'	Report	Béria 27', (yellow card) 64'; Amadou (yellow card) 82'	Stadium: Allianz Riviera; Attendance: 16,355; Referee: François Letexier

11 September 2016 4	Nice	3–2	Marseille	Nice
20:45	Balotelli 7' (pen.), 78'; Koziello (yellow card) 71'; Ricardo (yellow card) 86'; Cyprien 88'	Report	Thauvin 14'; Zambo Anguissa (yellow card) 31'; Dória (yellow card) 66'; Gomis 72' (pen.); Machach (yellow card) 87'	Stadium: Allianz Riviera; Attendance: 31,194; Referee: Frank Schneider

18 September 2016 5	Montpellier	1–1	Nice	Montpellier
15:00	Skhiri (yellow card) 60'; Boudebouz 67' (pen.)	Report	Eysseric (yellow card) 77'; Belhanda 85'	Stadium: Stade de la Mosson; Attendance: 12,272; Referee: Lionel Jaffredo

21 September 2016 6	Nice	4–0	Monaco	Nice
19:00 CEST (UTC+2)	Baysse 17'; Balotelli 30', 68'; Belhanda (yellow card) 45'; Pléa 86'	Report	Falcao (yellow card) 21'; Bakayoko (red card) 83'	Stadium: Allianz Riviera; Attendance: 21,867; Referee: Benoît Bastien

25 September 2016 7	Nancy	0–1	Nice	Tomblaine
17:00 CEST (UTC+2)	N'Guessan (yellow card) 10'; Badila (yellow card) 38'; Lenglet (yellow card) 72'	Report	Bodmer (yellow card) 24'; Pléa 60'	Stadium: Stade Marcel Picot; Attendance: 17,580; Referee: Antony Gautier

2 October 2016 8	Nice	2–1	Lorient	Nice
17:00 CEST (UTC+2)	Ricardo 11'; Sarr (yellow card) 59'; Balotelli 86', (yellow card) 87' (yellow-red card) 90+3'; Eysseric (yellow card) 89'	Report	Bellugou (yellow card) 27'; Moukandjo 61'; Cafú (yellow card) 86'; Moreira (yellow card) 90+2'	Stadium: Allianz Riviera; Attendance: 17,816; Referee: Olivier Thual

14 October 2016 9	Nice	2–0	Lyon	Nice
20:45 CEST (UTC+2)	Baysse 5'; Dalbert (yellow card) 25'; Dante (yellow card) 71'; Seri 76'; Balotelli (yellow card) 85'	Report	Morel (yellow card) 21'; Fekir (red card) 28'; Darder (yellow card) 43'; Gaspar (yellow card) 80'	Stadium: Allianz Riviera; Attendance: 28,139; Referee: Ruddy Buquet

23 October 2016 10	Metz	2–4	Nice	Metz
20:45 CEST (UTC+2)	Mandjeck 25', (yellow card) 54'; Sarr (yellow card) 65'; Diallo 69'; Cohade (yellow card) 73'; Jouffre (yellow card) 76'	Report	Pléa 12', 38' (pen.), 84'; Cyprien 90+1'	Stadium: Stade Saint-Symphorien; Attendance: 17,993; Referee: François Letexier

30 October 2016 11	Nice	4–1	Nantes	Nice
15:00 CEST (UTC+2)	Cyprien 9', 65', (yellow card) 64'; Balotelli 27'; Pléa 60'	Report	Lucas Lima (yellow card) 31'; Djidji (yellow card) 38'; Sala 47', (yellow card) 53'	Stadium: Allianz Riviera; Attendance: 24,418; Referee: Sébastien Moreira

6 November 2016 12	Caen	1–0	Nice	Caen
15:00 CEST (UTC+2)	Santini 42' (pen.); Makengo (yellow card) 65'; Vercoutre (yellow card) 79'	Report	Dante (yellow card) 26'; Pléa (yellow card) 79'; Balotelli (yellow card) 84'	Stadium: Stade Michel d'Ornano; Attendance: 16,034; Referee: Johan Hamel

20 November 2016 13	Saint-Étienne	0–1	Nice	Saint-Étienne
20:45 CEST (UTC+2)	Søderlund (yellow card) 34'; Lacroix (yellow card) 48'	Report	Eysseric 63'; Belhanda (yellow card) 90+3'	Stadium: Stade Geoffroy-Guichard; Attendance: 30,004; Referee: Frank Schneider

27 November 2016 14	Nice	1–1	Bastia	Nice
17:00 CEST (UTC+2)	Pléa 11'	Report	Thievy (yellow card) 28'; Cahuzac (yellow card) 45'; Crivelli 60'; Cahuzac (yellow card) 77'	Stadium: Allianz Riviera; Attendance: 20,856; Referee: Lionel Jaffredo

30 November 2016 15	Guingamp	0–1	Nice	Guingamp
19:00 CEST (UTC+2)	Kerbrat (yellow card) 66'; Diallo (yellow card) 90'	Report	Belhanda 5', (yellow card) 51'	Stadium: Stade de Roudourou; Attendance: 14,680; Referee: Benoît Millot

4 December 2016 16	Nice	3–0	Toulouse	Nice
20:45 CEST (UTC+2)	Pléa 23'; Belhanda 26'; Seri 65'	Report	Yago (yellow card) 53'; Bodiger (yellow card) 71'	Stadium: Allianz Riviera; Attendance: 16,835; Referee: Mikaël Lesage

11 December 2016 17	Paris Saint-Germain	2–2	Nice	Paris
20:45 CET (UTC+1)	Kurzawa (yellow card) 41'; Cavani 46', 59'; Motta (yellow card) 77'	Report	Sarr (yellow card) 11'; Cyprien 32'; Pléa 45+3'; Balotelli (yellow card) 83'; Belhanda (yellow card) 90+3'	Stadium: Parc des Princes; Attendance: 47,665; Referee: Clément Turpin

18 December 2016 18	Nice	2–1	Dijon	Nice
15:00 CET (UTC+1)	Balotelli 32' (pen.), 50'; Souquet (yellow card) 36'	Report	Abdelhamid (yellow card) 31'; Tavares 37' (pen.); Rüfli (yellow card) 41'; Gastien (yellow card) 84'; Varrault (red card) 88'	Stadium: Allianz Riviera; Attendance: 22,229; Referee: Benoît Millot

21 December 2016 19	Bordeaux	0–0	Nice	Nice
20:50 CET (UTC+1)	Toulalan (yellow card) 30'; Rolán (yellow card) 36'	Report	Le Marchand (yellow card) 23'; Koziello (yellow card) 80'; Balotelli (red card) 90+2'; Belhanda (red card) 90+3'	Stadium: Allianz Riviera; Attendance: 27,614; Referee: Mikaël Lesage

15 January 2017 20	Nice	0–0	Metz	Nice
15:00 CET (UTC+1)	Sarr (yellow card) 39'; Koziello (yellow card) 75'	Report	Diagne (yellow card) 73'	Stadium: Allianz Riviera; Attendance: 21,502; Referee: Bartolomeu Varela

20 January 2017 21	Bastia	1–1	Nice	Bastia
20:45 CET (UTC+1)	Oniangué 17'; Cahuzac (yellow card) 56' (yellow-red card) 64'; Mostefa (yellow card) 90'	Report	Souquet 34'	Stadium: Stade Armand Cesari; Attendance: 9,757; Referee: Clément Turpin

29 January 2017 22	Nice	3–1	Guingamp	Nice
15:00 CET (UTC+1)	Pléa 11'; Dalbert (yellow card) 14'; Koziello (yellow card) 23'; Seri 38'; Sarr (yellow card) 74'; Balotelli 87'	Report	Marçal (yellow card) 20'; Briand 63', (yellow card) 88'; Mendy (yellow card) 84'	Stadium: Allianz Riviera; Attendance: 20,063; Referee: Jérôme Miguelgorry

4 February 2017 23	Monaco	3–0	Nice	Monaco
17:00 CET (UTC+1)	Germain 48'; Jemerson (yellow card) 57'; Falcao 60', 81'	Report	Seri (yellow card) 13'	Stadium: Stade Louis II; Attendance: 16,049; Referee: Benoît Bastien

8 February 2017 24	Nice	1–0	Saint-Étienne	Nice
18:00 CET (UTC+1)	Cyprien 7'; Belhanda (yellow card) 36'	Report	Hamouma (yellow card) 38'; Théophile-Catherine (yellow card) 40'; Selnæs (yellow card) 45'	Stadium: Allianz Riviera; Attendance: 18,225; Referee: Amaury Delerue

12 February 2017 25	Rennes	2–2	Nice	Rennes
15:00 CET (UTC+1)	Amalfitano 7'; Sio 21'; Mendes (yellow card) 90'	Report	Donis 59'; Eysseric 81'; Belhanda (yellow card) 83'; Baysse (yellow card) 90'	Stadium: Roazhon Park; Attendance: 25,665; Referee: Johan Hamel

18 February 2017 26	Lorient	0–1	Nice	Lorient
20:00 CET (UTC+1)	Marveaux (yellow card) 29'; Bellugou (yellow card) 53'; Moukandjo (yellow card) 68'	Report	Cyprien 15'; Obbadi (yellow card) 43'; Balotelli (red card) 68'; Cardinale (yellow card) 79'	Stadium: Stade du Moustoir; Attendance: 10,537; Referee: Tony Chapron

24 February 2017 27	Nice	2–1	Montpellier	Nice
20:45 CET (UTC+1)	Belhanda (yellow card) 49'; Le Bihan 68', 85'; Dalbert (yellow card) 71'	Report	Mounié 9'; Sylla (yellow card) 85'	Stadium: Allianz Riviera; Attendance: 18,998; Referee: Frank Schneider

4 March 2017 28	Dijon	0–1	Nice	Dijon
20:00 CET (UTC+1)	Abeid (yellow card) 24'; Lees-Melou (yellow card) 27'	Report	Cyprien (yellow card) 37', (goal) 69'	Stadium: Stade Gaston Gérard; Attendance: 10,209; Referee: Bartolomeu Varela

10 March 2017 29	Nice	2–2	Caen	Dijon
19:00 CET (UTC+1)	Souquet (yellow card) 41'; Balotelli 71'; Donis 77', (yellow card) 89'	Report	Santini 36'; Karamoh 50'; Ben Youssef (yellow card) 56'	Stadium: Stade Gaston Gérard; Attendance: 23,640; Referee: François Letexier

18 March 2017 30	Nantes	1–1	Nice	Nantes
17:00 CET (UTC+1)	Sala 22'; Lucas Lima (yellow card) 51'; Diego Carlos (yellow card) 64'; Nakoulma (yellow card) 90+3'	Report	Seri 28'; Eysseric (yellow card) 44'	Stadium: Stade de la Beaujoire; Attendance: 25,854; Referee: Benoît Millot

2 April 2017 31	Nice	2–1	Bordeaux	Nice
21:00 CET (UTC+1)	Balotelli 16' (pen.), (yellow card) 88'; Eysseric 27'; Souquet (yellow card) 40'	Report	Laborde 9'; Jovanović (yellow card) 24'	Stadium: Allianz Riviera; Attendance: 35,624; Referee: Benoît Bastien

7 April 2017 32	Lille	1–2	Nice	Villeneuve-d'Ascq
20:45 CET (UTC+1)	Amadou 14'; Mavuba (yellow card) 74'	Report	Balotelli 17', 44'; Dante (yellow card) 61'	Stadium: Stade Pierre-Mauroy; Attendance: 32,107; Referee: Amaury Delerue

15 April 2017 33	Nice	3–1	Nancy	Nice
17:00 CET (UTC+1)	Le Bihan 35'; Dante (yellow card) 45+2'; Seri 51' (pen.), 84'	Report	Dalé 26'; Pedretti (yellow card) 30'; Puyo (yellow card) 58'	Stadium: Allianz Riviera; Attendance: 22,518; Referee: Mikael Lesage

23 April 2017 34	Toulouse	1–1	Nice	Toulouse
15:00 CET (UTC+1)	Moubandje (yellow card) 26'; Bodiger (yellow card) 45+1'; Jean 56'; Durmaz (yellow card) 88'	Report	Eysseric (yellow card) 37', (goal) 59'; Seri (yellow card) 43'; Baysse (yellow card) 80'; Dalbert (yellow card) 87'; Balotelli (yellow card) 90+2'	Stadium: Stadium Municipal; Attendance: 15,232; Referee: Frank Schneider

30 April 2017 35	Nice	3–1	Paris Saint-Germain	Nice
21:00 CET (UTC+1)	Dalbert (yellow card) 21'; Balotelli 26'; Seri (yellow card) 41'; Ricardo 48'; Donis 90+2'	Report	Meunier (yellow card) 52'; Draxler (yellow card) 59'; Cavani (yellow card) 59'; Marquinhos 64'; Motta (red card) 90'; Di María (red card) 90+3'	Stadium: Allianz Riviera; Attendance: 33,190; Referee: Ruddy Buquet

7 May 2017 36	Marseille	2–1	Nice	Marseille
21:00 CET (UTC+1)	Gomis 21'; Cabella (yellow card) 34'; Payet (yellow card) 47'; Sakai (yellow card) 59'; Evra 66'; Fanni (yellow card) 67'; Pelé (yellow card) 90+3'	Report	Balotelli 50'; Dante (yellow card) 62'	Stadium: Stade Vélodrome; Attendance: 61,685; Referee: Antony Gautier

14 May 2017 37	Nice	0–2	Angers	Nice
21:00 CET (UTC+1)	Belhanda (yellow card) 32'	Report	Santamaria (yellow card) 24'; N'Doye 35'; Toko Ekambi 90+3'	Stadium: Allianz Riviera; Attendance: 32,446; Referee: Mikael Lesage

20 May 2017 38	Lyon	3–3	Nice	Décines-Charpieu
21:00 CET (UTC+1)	Le Marchand 10' (o.g.); Lacazette 48', 78'	Report	Seri (yellow card) 12', (goal) 90+4' (pen.); Donis 15', 69'	Stadium: Parc Olympique Lyonnais; Attendance: 50,080; Referee: Jérôme Miguelgorry

=== Coupe de France ===
8 January 2017 Round of 64	Lorient	2–1	Nice	Lorient
14:15	Guendouzi (yellow card) 12'; Aliadière 71'; Mesloub 75'	Report	Cyprien (yellow card) 17'; Pléa 43'	Stadium: Stade du Moustoir – Yves Allainmat; Attendance: 9,424; Referee: Olivier Thual

=== Coupe de la Ligue ===
14 December 2016 Round of 16	Bordeaux	3–2	Nice	Bordeaux
18:45	Plašil 14'; Laborde 22', 55'; Gajić (yellow card) 53'; Vada (yellow card) 81'; Pellenard (yellow card) 83'	Report	Pléa 42'; Boscagli (yellow card) 79'; Balotelli 83' (pen.), (yellow card) 86'	Stadium: Matmut Atlantique; Attendance: 15,049; Referee: François Letexier

=== UEFA Europa League ===
==== Group stage ====
Pos	Team	Pld	W	D	L	GF	GA	GD	Pts	Qualification	SCH	KRA	SAL	NCE
1	(Germany) Schalke 04	6	5	0	1	9	3	+6	15	Advance to knockout phase	—	2–0	3–1	2–0
2	(Russia) Krasnodar	6	2	1	3	8	8	0	7	Advance to knockout phase	0–1	—	1–1	5–2
3	(Austria) Red Bull Salzburg	6	2	1	3	6	6	0	7		2–0	0–1	—	0–1
4	(France) Nice	6	2	0	4	5	11	−6	6		0–1	2–1	0–2	—

Source: UEFA
Rules for classification: Group stage tiebreakers

15 September 2016 1	Nice (France)	0–1	(Germany) Schalke 04	Nice, France
21:05 CEST (UTC+2)	Seri (yellow card) 72'; Balotelli (yellow card) 90'	Report	Rahman (yellow card) 32', (goal) 75'; Stambouli (yellow card) 44'	Stadium: Allianz Riviera; Attendance: 21,378; Referee: Alberto Undiano Mallenco (Spain)

29 September 2016 2	Krasnodar (Russia)	5–2	(France) Nice	Krasnodar, Russia
20:00 (MSK)	Smolov 22'; Joãozinho 33', 65' (pen.); Naldo (yellow card) 50'; Granqvist (yellow card) 55'; Ari 86', 90+3', (yellow card) 86'	Report	Balotelli 43'; Seri (yellow card) 45+1'; Baysse (yellow card) 64'; Cardinale (yellow card) 69'; Cyprien 71'	Stadium: Kuban Stadium; Attendance: 10,750; Referee: Ivan Bebek (Croatia)

20 October 2016 3	Red Bull Salzburg (Austria)	0–1	(France) Nice	Wals-Siezenheim, Austria
20:00 (MSK)	Hwang Hee-chan (yellow card) 85'; Laimer (yellow card) 88'	Report	Pléa 13'; Dalbert (yellow card) 71'; Eysseric (yellow card) 90+4'	Stadium: Red Bull Arena; Attendance: 9,473; Referee: Yevhen Aranovsky (Ukraine)

3 November 2016 4	Nice (France)	0–2	(Austria) Red Bull Salzburg	Nice, France
21:05 (UTC+2)	Koziello (yellow card) 63'; Balotelli (yellow card) 89'	Report	Hwang Hee-chan 72', 73'; Laimer (yellow card) 54'; Upamecano (yellow card) 90+3'	Stadium: Allianz Riviera; Attendance: 17,582; Referee: Hüseyin Göçek (Turkey)

24 November 2016 5	Schalke 04 (Germany)	2–0	(France) Nice	Gelsenkirchen, Germany
19:00	Konoplyanka 14'; Tekpetey (yellow card) 50' (yellow-red card) 90+3'; Kehrer (yellow card) 67'; Aogo 80' (pen.)	Report	Dalbert (yellow card) 28'; Dante (yellow card) 47'; Boscagli (yellow card) 62'; Cardinale (yellow card) 90+4'	Stadium: Veltins-Arena; Attendance: 51,504; Referee: Aliyar Aghayev (Azerbaijan)

8 December 2016 6	Nice (France)	2–1	(Russia) Krasnodar	Nice, France
21:05	Balotelli (yellow card) 26'; Marcel (yellow card) 55'; Bosetti 64' (pen.); Le Marchand 77'	Report	Eboue (yellow card) 25'; Granqvist (yellow card) 41', (red card) 61'; Smolov 52'	Stadium: Allianz Riviera; Attendance: 12,722; Referee: Sandro Schärer (Switzerland)

== Statistics ==
=== Appearances and goals ===
No.	Pos	Nat	Player	Total		Ligue 1		Coupe de France		Coupe de la Ligue		Europa League	
No.	Pos	Nat	Player	Apps	Goals	Apps	Goals	Apps	Goals	Apps	Goals	Apps	Goals
Goalkeepers
30	GK	(France) FRA	Yoan Cardinale	41	0	36	0	0	0	0	0	5	0
40	GK	(Argentina) ARG	Walter Benítez	6	0	2+1	0	1	0	1	0	1	0
Defenders
2	DF	(France) FRA	Arnaud Souquet	31	1	26	1	1	0	1	0	3	0
4	DF	(France) FRA	Paul Baysse	25	2	20+2	2	0	0	0	0	3	0
15	DF	(France) FRA	Patrick Burner	7	0	3+1	0	0+1	0	1+0	0	1	0
23	DF	(Portugal) POR	Ricardo	30	2	23+1	2	1	0	0	0	5	0
28	DF	(France) FRA	Olivier Boscagli	4	0	0+1	0	0	0	1	0	2	0
29	DF	(Brazil) BRA	Dalbert	38	0	33	0	1	0	0	0	4	0
31	DF	(Brazil) BRA	Dante	39	0	33	0	0	0	1	0	5	0
32	DF	(France) FRA	Malang Sarr	32	1	25+2	1	1	0	0	0	4	0
36	DF	(France) FRA	Romain Perraud	1	0	0	0	0	0	0	0	1	0
Midfielders
5	MF	(Morocco) MAR	Younès Belhanda	36	3	28+3	3	0	0	0	0	3+2	0
6	MF	(Ivory Coast) CIV	Jean Michaël Seri	39	7	34	7	0	0	1	0	3+1	0
8	MF	(France) FRA	Arnaud Lusamba	9	0	3+3	0	1	0	0+1	0	1	0
11	MF	(Tunisia) TUN	Bassem Srarfi	5	0	0+5	0	0	0	0	0	0	0
12	MF	(Madagascar) MAD	Albert Rafetraniaina	1	0	0	0	0	0	0	0	0+1	0
13	MF	(France) FRA	Valentin Eysseric	33	4	23+6	4	0	0	0	0	2+2	0
18	MF	(France) FRA	Rémi Walter	26	0	15+7	0	0	0	0	0	2+2	0
24	MF	(France) FRA	Mounir Obbadi	6	0	3+3	0	0	0	0	0	0	0
25	MF	(France) FRA	Wylan Cyprien	34	9	27+2	8	1	0	0	0	2+2	1
26	MF	(France) FRA	Vincent Koziello	34	1	19+8	1	1	0	1	0	5	0
33	MF	(France) FRA	Vincent Marcel	10	0	3+3	0	1	0	0+1	0	1+1	0
Forwards
9	FW	(Italy) ITA	Mario Balotelli	28	17	20+3	15	0	0	1	1	4	1
10	FW	(France) FRA	Mickaël Le Bihan	10	3	2+8	3	0	0	0	0	0	0
14	FW	(France) FRA	Alassane Pléa	32	14	22+3	11	1	1	1	1	3+2	1
22	FW	(Greece) GRE	Anastasios Donis	22	5	3+15	5	0	0	0+1	0	2+1	0
23	FW	(France) FRA	Alexy Bosetti	2	1	0	0	0+1	0	0	0	0+1	1
34	FW	(France) FRA	Hicham Mahou	3	0	0+1	0	0+1	0	0	0	0+1	0
Players transferred out during the season
24	DF	(France) FRA	Mathieu Bodmer	17	0	7+5	0	0	0	1	0	3+1	0

Last updated: 20 May 2017
Source: Competitions

=== Goalscorers ===
Rank	No.	Pos.	Nat	Player	Ligue 1	Coupe de France	Coupe de Ligue	Europa League	Total
1	9	ST	(Italy)	Mario Balotelli	15	0	1	1	17
2	14	FW	(France)	Alassane Pléa	11	1	1	1	14
3	14	MF	(France)	Wylan Cyprien	8	0	0	1	9
4	6	MF	(Ivory Coast)	Jean Michaël Seri	7	0	0	0	7
5	22	FW	(Greece)	Anastasios Donis	5	0	0	0	5
6	13	MF	(France)	Valentin Eysseric	4	0	0	0	4
7	5	MF	(Morocco)	Younès Belhanda	3	0	0	0	3
7	10	FW	(France)	Mickaël Le Bihan	3	0	0	0	3
9	4	DF	(France)	Paul Baysse	2	0	0	0	2
9	23	DF	(Portugal)	Ricardo	2	0	0	0	2
11	34	DF	(France)	Malang Sarr	1	0	0	0	1
11	26	MF	(France)	Vincent Koziello	1	0	0	0	1
11	2	DF	(France)	Arnaud Souquet	1	0	0	0	1
11	23	FW	(France)	Alexy Bosetti	0	0	0	1	1
11	20	DF	(France)	Maxime Le Marchand	0	0	0	1	1

Last updated: 8 June 2017

=== Clean sheets ===
Rank	No.	Nat	Name	Ligue 1	Coupe de France	Coupe de Ligue	Europa League	Total
1	30	(France)	Yoan Cardinale	13	0	0	0	13

Last updated: 14 October 2016
