= Wylan Cyprien =

French footballer (born 1995)

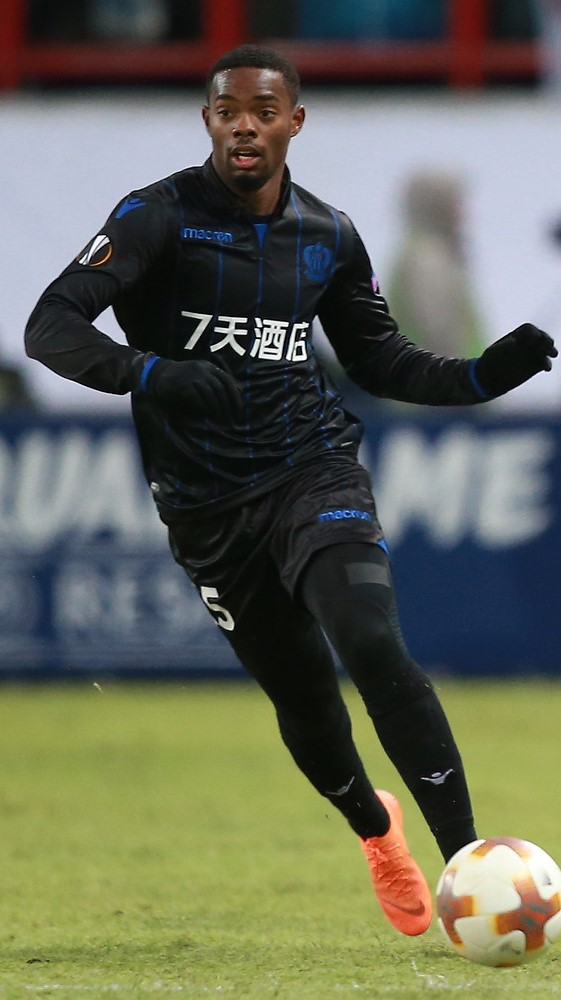
- Cyprien playing for Nice in 2018

Personal information
- Full name: Wylan Jean-Claude Cyprien
- Date of birth: 28 January 1995 (age 31)
- Place of birth: Les Abymes, Guadeloupe
- Height: 1.84 m (6 ft 0 in)
- Position: Midfielder

Team information
- Current team: Maccabi Netanya

Youth career
- 2006–2008: Paris FC
- 2008–2012: Lens

Senior career*
Years	Team	Apps	(Gls)
2012–2016	Lens	103	(10)
2016–2021	Nice	94	(21)
2020–2021	→ Parma (loan)	13	(0)
2021–2025	Parma	20	(2)
2021–2022	→ Nantes (loan)	24	(2)
2022–2023	→ Sion (loan)	18	(3)
2025	Changchun Yatai	12	(2)
2026–	Maccabi Netanya	9	(0)

International career^{‡}
2010–2011	France U16	9	(2)
2012–2013	France U18	5	(0)
2013	France U19	3	(0)
2016	France U21	2	(1)
- * Club domestic league appearances and goals as of 22 November 2025 ‡ National team caps and goals as of 14 November 2016

Wylan Jean-Claude Cyprien (born 28 January 1995) is a French professional footballer who plays as a midfielder for Maccabi Netanya.

== Early life ==
Born in Les Abymes, Guadeloupe, France on 28 January 1995, Cyprien moved to metropolitan France at a young age.

== Club career ==
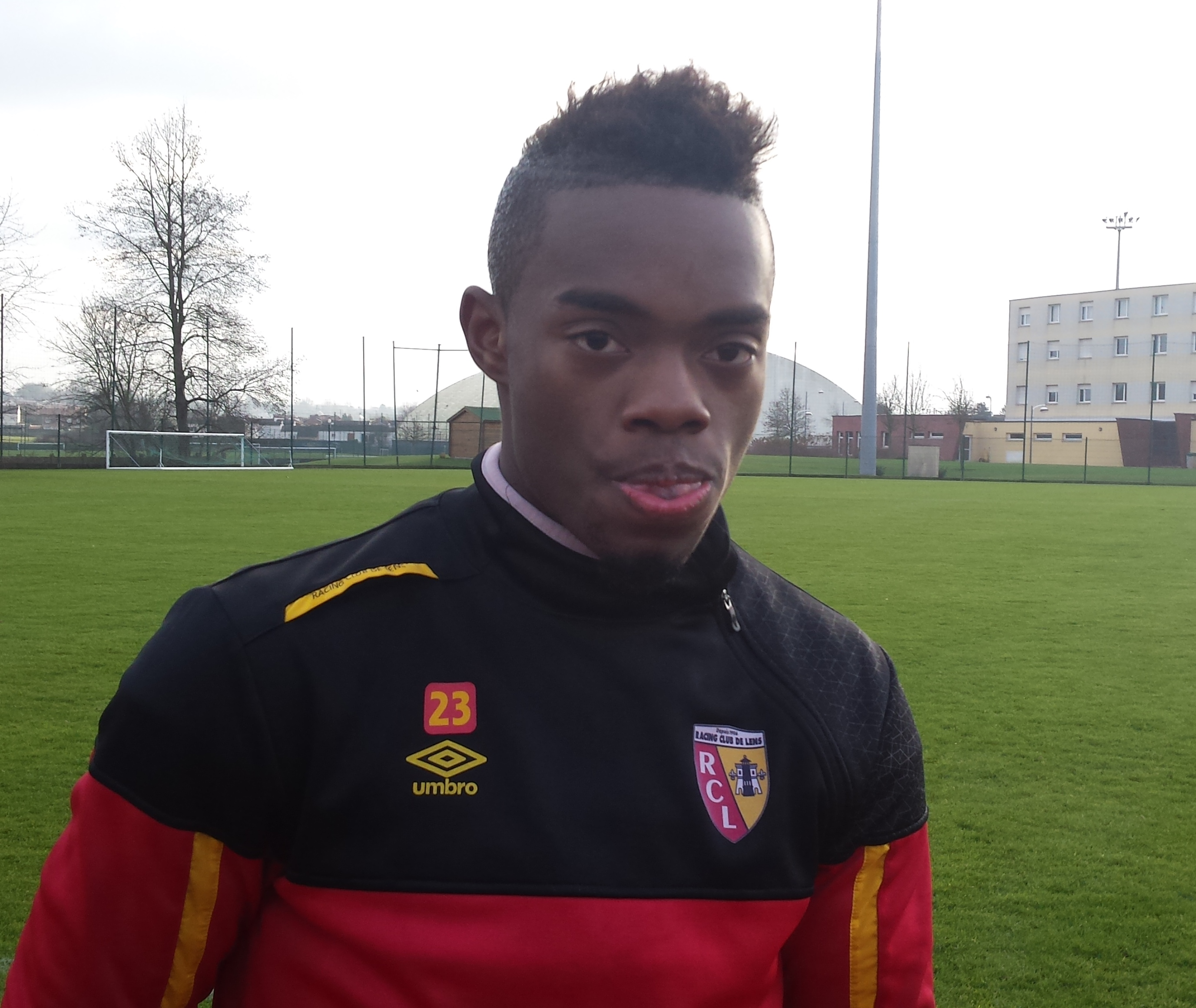
Cyprien with Lens in December 2014

=== Lens ===
Cyprien began his youth career at Paris FC, before moving to Lens in 2008. He is a graduate of the Lens youth academy and made his debut for the first team in 2012. He passed through the youth ranks in July 2012. He helped Lens win promotion to Ligue 1, following a second place finish during the 2013–14 Ligue 2 season. The following campaign, Cyprien scored two goals and set up a further two, as Lens finished last and went straight back down to the second division. He made over 100 appearances for Lens, before his transfer to Nice in 2016.

=== Nice ===
On 27 July 2016, Ligue 1 club Nice reached an agreement with Lens for the transfer of Cyprien. The transfer fee was a reported €5m. He made his debut for the club on the opening day of the Ligue 1 season, coming on as a second-half substitute for Vincent Marcel in a 1–0 victory over Rennes.

Cyprien's first goal for the club came in the Europa League on 29 September 2016, a consolation goal in his side's 5–2 defeat to Russian club Krasnodar in the group stage of the competition.

On 10 March 2017, Cyprien picked up an ACL injury in a Ligue 1 match against SM Caen, a game that finished 2–2, and he was ruled out a day later for the remainder of the season.

Cyprien spent much of the first-half of the 2017–18 campaign on the sidelines and he eventually appeared in just 946 minutes of Ligue 1 action. On 2 March 2018, Cyprien assisted Mario Balotelli's opening goal and scored the winning goal with a volley in Nice's Ligue 1 2–1 home win over Lille OSC.

==== 2019–20 season ====
Cyprien made his season debut in the first round of Ligue 1 fixtures against Amiens on 10 August 2019, assisting Dante's winning goal in the fifth minute of second-half stoppage time. A week later, he scored his first goal of the season, converting from the penalty spot, before assisting Ignatius Ganago for the game winning goal over Nîmes.

On 18 October, Cyprien picked up two yellow cards and was sent off in a 4–1 home loss to reigning champions PSG. Two months later on 7 December, Cyprien scored two goals and earned man of the match honours as Nice defeated FC Metz in the 17th round of Ligue 1 fixtures by a score of 4–1.

=== Parma ===
On 5 October 2020, Cyprien signed with Parma. He joined the Serie A side on a season-long loan, potentially to become a permanent deal running until June 2025 upon the meeting of performance-based objectives.

==== Loan to Nantes ====
The transfer to Parma became permanent at the end of the season. On 24 June 2021, he was loaned to FC Nantes for the 2021–22 season.

==== Loan to Sion ====
On 9 August 2022, Cyprien joined Sion in Switzerland on loan with an option to buy.

=== Changchun Yatai ===
On 28 January 2025, Cyprien moved to Changchun Yatai in China.

== International career ==
Cyprien is a former France youth international, having been capped at U16, U18, U19 and U21 levels.

== Career statistics ==
As of match played 22 November 2025

Appearances and goals by club, season and competition
Club	Season	League			National cup (Note: Includes Coupe de France, Coppa Italia, Swiss Cup)		League cup (Note: Includes Coupe de la Ligue)		Europe		Total	
Club	Season	Division	Apps	Goals	Apps	Goals	Apps	Goals	Apps	Goals	Apps	Goals
Lens	2012–13	Ligue 2	12	0	3	0	0	0	—		15	0
Lens	2013–14	Ligue 2	23	1	4	0	1	0	—		28	1
Lens	2014–15	Ligue 1	33	2	1	0	1	0	—		35	2
Lens	2015–16	Ligue 2	34	6	0	0	1	0	—		35	6
Lens	Total		102	9	8	0	3	0	—		113	9
Nice	2016–17	Ligue 1	29	8	1	0	0	0	4 (Note: Appearances in UEFA Europa League)	1	34	9
Nice	2017–18	Ligue 1	16	2	0	0	2	0	3	0	21	2
Nice	2018–19	Ligue 1	29	4	1	0	0	0	—		30	4
Nice	2019–20	Ligue 1	20	7	3	0	1	1	—		24	8
Nice	Total		94	21	5	0	3	1	7	1	109	23
Parma (loan)	2020–21	Serie A	13	0	2	0	—		—		15	0
Parma	2023–24	Serie B	18	2	1	0	—		—		19	2
Parma	2024–25	Serie A	2	0	1	0	—		—		3	0
Parma	Total		33	2	4	0	—		—		37	2
Nantes (loan)	2021–22	Ligue 1	24	2	5	0	—		—		29	2
Sion (loan)	2022–23	Swiss Super League	18	3	1	0	—		—		19	3
Changchun Yatai	2025	Chinese Super League	12	2	0	0	—		—		12	2
Career total			283	39	23	0	6	1	7	1	319	41

== Honours ==
Nantes

- Coupe de France: 2021–22

Parma

- Serie B: 2023–24
