= Ricardo Pereira (footballer, born 1993) =

Portuguese footballer (born 1993)

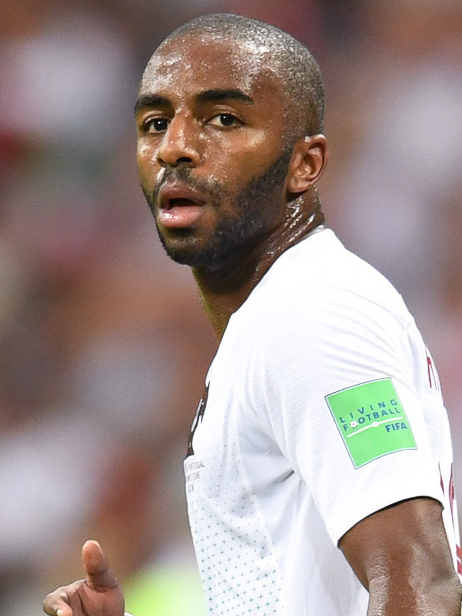
- Pereira playing for Portugal at the 2018 FIFA World Cup

Personal information
- Full name: Ricardo Domingos Barbosa Pereira
- Date of birth: 6 October 1993 (age 33)
- Place of birth: Lisbon, Portugal
- Height: 1.75 m (5 ft 9 in)
- Position: Right-back

Youth career
- 2001–2004: Futebol Benfica
- 2004–2010: Sporting CP
- 2010–2011: Naval
- 2011–2012: Vitória Guimarães

Senior career*
Years	Team	Apps	(Gls)
2012–2013	Vitória Guimarães	30	(0)
2013	Vitória Guimarães B	1	(0)
2013–2015	Porto B	18	(2)
2013–2018	Porto	46	(4)
2015	→ Nice II (loan)	1	(0)
2015–2017	→ Nice (loan)	50	(2)
2018–2026	Leicester City	189	(12)

International career
2012	Portugal U19	3	(1)
2012–2013	Portugal U20	14	(4)
2013–2015	Portugal U21	18	(7)
2016	Portugal U23	1	(0)
2015–2019	Portugal	7	(0)
Medal record
Men's football
Representing Portugal
UEFA European Under-21 Championship
Runner-up	2015
- * Club domestic league appearances and goals as of 23:14, 4 May 2026 (UTC)

Ricardo Domingos Barbosa Pereira (born 6 October 1993) is a Portuguese professional footballer who plays as a right-back.

After starting out at Vitória de Guimarães – winning the 2013 Taça de Portugal and being the competition's top scorer in the process – he signed with Porto, being part of the squad that won the 2017–18 Primeira Liga but also spending two years on loan to French club Nice. In May 2018, he joined Leicester City for €25 million, going on to win three trophies including the 2020–21 FA Cup and the 2021 FA Community Shield while making 220 appearances in all competitions.

A senior international since 2015, Pereira represented Portugal at the 2018 FIFA World Cup.

== Club career ==
=== Vitória Guimarães ===
Born in Lisbon of Cape Verdean descent, Pereira began playing youth football with local Benfica, signing in 2010 with Naval after a six-year spell at Sporting CP's academy. He moved to Vitória de Guimarães after only one year, completing his development with the club.

Pereira made his first-team – and Primeira Liga – debut on 1 April 2012, playing 12 minutes in a 3–1 home win over Paços de Ferreira. He scored six goals in as many games in the 2012–13 edition of the Taça de Portugal, including the 2–1 winner in the final against Benfica as the Minho Province side won the tournament for the first time in their history.

=== Porto ===
On 16 April 2013, before the season was over, Pereira agreed to join Porto on 1 July, moving alongside teammate Tiago Rodrigues. He alternated constantly between the first and the second teams during his early tenure, also being reconverted to a full-back by manager Paulo Fonseca. His maiden appearance in the UEFA Champions League took place on 26 August 2014, when he replaced the injured Casemiro late into the 2–0 home victory over Lille in the play-off round.

In summer 2015, after only 33 first-team appearances over two seasons, Pereira was loaned for two years to French club Nice. He made his debut in Ligue 1 on 12 September, playing the entire 0–1 home loss to Guingamp.

Pereira was voted as the French League's best full-back by the International Centre for Sports Studies in April 2016.

=== Leicester City ===
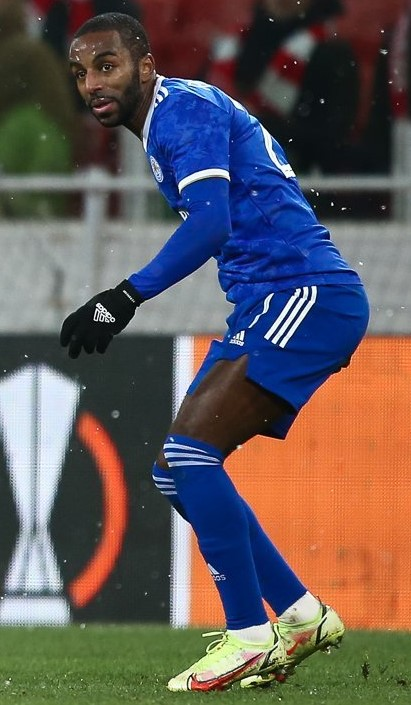
Pereira playing for Leicester City in 2021

On 17 May 2018, a €25 million deal was agreed for Pereira to move to Leicester City. He made his Premier League debut on 10 August, playing the entire 2–1 away defeat against Manchester United. He scored his first goal while celebrating his 25th birthday, netting after a counter-attack in a 1–2 home loss to Everton. At the end of the campaign, he was voted both his team's Player of the Season and Players’ Player of the Season.

Pereira scored in consecutive wins over Tottenham Hotspur and Newcastle United in September 2019, both at the King Power Stadium, and the following 4 March he netted the only goal against Birmingham City in the fifth round of the FA Cup to put the Foxes into the last eight for the second time in eight years. Days later, he was ruled out for the rest of the season with an anterior cruciate ligament injury.

On 18 February 2022, Pereira signed an extension until 2026. On 14 April, his 88th-minute strike closed a 2–1 victory at PSV Eindhoven (also the aggregate score) and confirmed qualification for the semi-finals of the UEFA Europa Conference League.

Pereira struggled heavily with injury problems during his spell at the club, also being relegated to the EFL Championship in 2023. The following campaign, he was often deployed as an inverted full-back under new coach Enzo Maresca; he would step in as a holding midfielder while his team possessed the ball, and managed to stay fit as they won the league and promoted.

Pereira started two games in the 2024–25 season. On 11 November 2024, manager Steve Cooper confirmed that he would be ruled out "for about four months" due to a hamstring injury. Leicester were ultimately relegated to the second tier, further dropping to EFL League One at the end of the following campaign in the midst of a severe financial crisis.

On 1 May 2026, the club announced that Pereira would leave in the summer when his contract expired.

== International career ==
Pereira won 35 caps for Portugal at youth level, scoring 12 goals. He was part of the under-21 squad that finished second at the 2015 UEFA European Championship, contributing four starting appearances and netting in the 5–0 semi-final victory over Germany.

On 6 November 2015, Pereira was called up to the full side for the second time, ahead of friendlies against Russia and Luxembourg. He made his debut in the former match, featuring eight minutes in the 1–0 defeat in Krasnodar.

Pereira was selected by manager Fernando Santos for his 2018 FIFA World Cup squad. He made his debut in the competition on 30 June, playing the entire 2–1 loss to Uruguay in the round of 16.

== Career statistics ==
=== Club ===
As of match played 2 May 2026

Appearances and goals by club, season and competition
Club	Season	League			National cup (Note: Includes Taça de Portugal, Coupe de France, FA Cup)		League cup (Note: Includes Taça da Liga, Coupe de la Ligue, EFL Cup)		Continental		Other		Total	
Club	Season	Division	Apps	Goals	Apps	Goals	Apps	Goals	Apps	Goals	Apps	Goals	Apps	Goals
Vitória Guimarães	2011–12	Primeira Liga	3	0	0	0	0	0	—		—		3	0
Vitória Guimarães	2012–13	Primeira Liga	27	0	6	6	3	2	—		—		36	8
Vitória Guimarães	Total		30	0	6	6	3	2	—		—		39	8
Vitória Guimarães B	2012–13	Segunda Liga	1	0	—		—		—		—		1	0
Porto B	2013–14	Segunda Liga	12	1	—		—		—		—		12	1
Porto B	2014–15	Segunda Liga	6	1	—		—		—		—		6	1
Porto B	Total		18	2	—		—		—		—		18	2
Porto	2013–14	Primeira Liga	14	2	2	0	2	0	3 (Note: One appearance in UEFA Champions League, two appearances in UEFA Europa League)	0	0	0	21	2
Porto	2014–15	Primeira Liga	5	0	0	0	5	0	3 (Note: Appearances in UEFA Champions League)	0	—		13	0
Porto	2017–18	Primeira Liga	27	2	6	0	3	0	7	0	—		43	2
Porto	Total		46	4	8	0	10	0	13	0	—		77	4
Nice II (loan)	2015–16	CFA	1	0	—		—		—		—		1	0
Nice (loan)	2015–16	Ligue 1	26	0	0	0	1	0	—		—		27	0
Nice (loan)	2016–17	Ligue 1	24	2	1	0	0	0	5 (Note: Appearances in UEFA Europa League)	0	—		30	2
Nice (loan)	Total		50	2	1	0	1	0	5	0	—		57	2
Leicester City	2018–19	Premier League	35	2	0	0	2	0	—		—		37	2
Leicester City	2019–20	Premier League	28	3	1	1	4	0	—		—		33	4
Leicester City	2020–21	Premier League	15	0	2	0	0	0	2	0	—		19	0
Leicester City	2021–22	Premier League	14	1	1	0	2	0	6 (Note: One appearance in UEFA Europa League, five appearances and one goal in UEFA Europa Conference League)	1	1 (Note: Appearance in FA Community Shield)	0	24	2
Leicester City	2022–23	Premier League	10	1	1	0	0	0	—		—		11	1
Leicester City	2023–24	Championship	39	3	3	1	3	0	—		—		45	4
Leicester City	2024–25	Premier League	10	0	0	0	2	0	—		—		12	0
Leicester City	2025–26	Championship	38	2	1	0	0	0	—		—		39	2
Leicester City	Total		189	12	9	2	13	0	8	1	1	0	220	15
Career total			335	20	24	8	27	2	26	1	1	0	413	31

=== International ===
Appearances and goals by national team and year
National team	Year	Apps	Goals
Portugal	2015	2	0
Portugal	2017	1	0
Portugal	2018	2	0
Portugal	2019	2	0
Total		7	0

== Honours ==
Vitória Guimarães

- Taça de Portugal: 2012–13

Porto

- Primeira Liga: 2017–18

Leicester City

- FA Cup: 2020–21
- FA Community Shield: 2021
- EFL Championship: 2023–24

Portugal U21

- UEFA European Under-21 Championship runner-up: 2015

Individual

- Primeira Liga Team of the Year: 2017–18
- Leicester City Player of the Season/Players' Player of the Season: 2018–19
