= Maxime Le Marchand =

French footballer (born 1989)

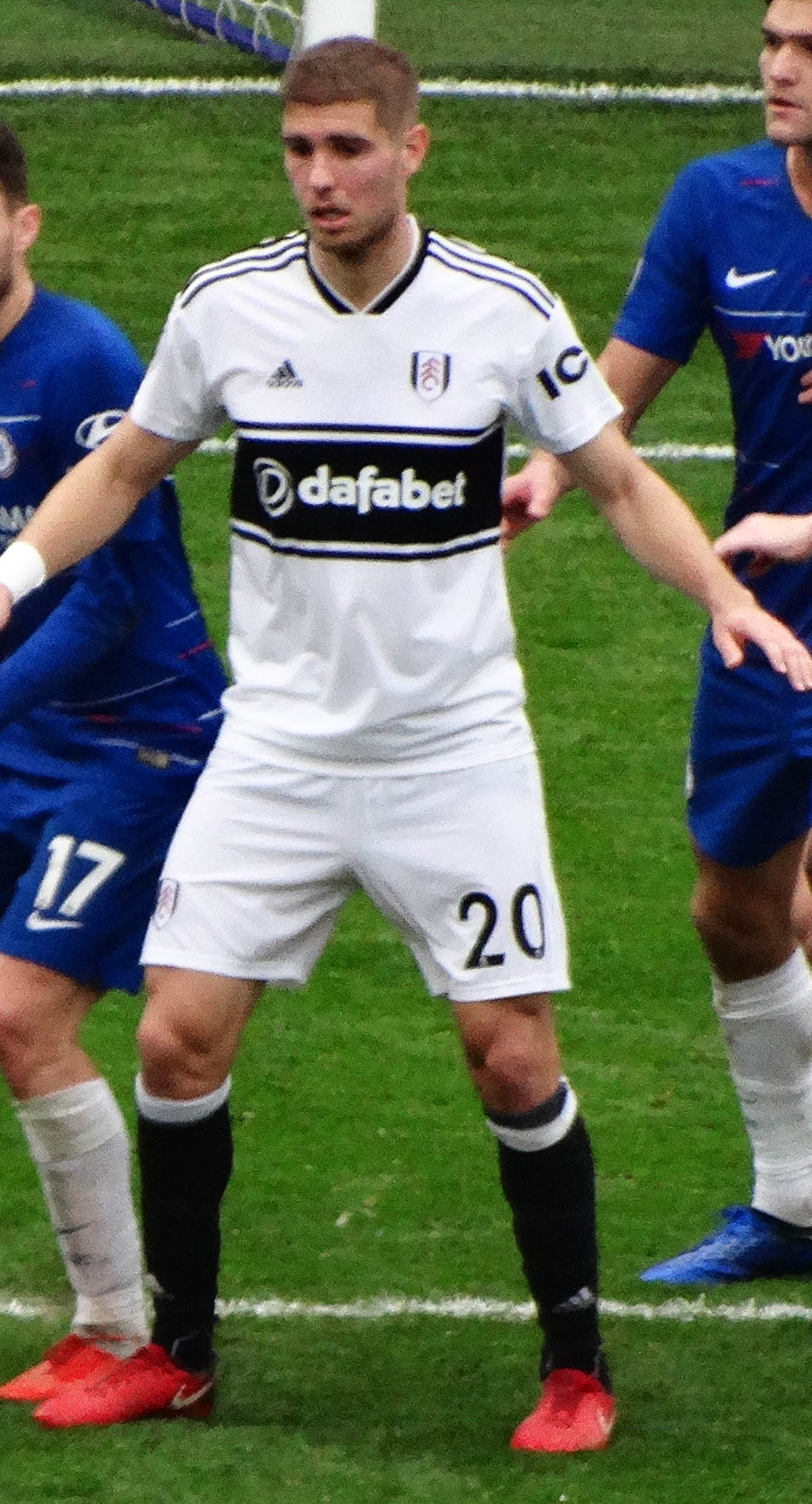
- Le Marchand playing for Fulham in 2018

Personal information
- Full name: Maxime Le Marchand
- Date of birth: 11 October 1989 (age 37)
- Place of birth: Saint-Malo, France
- Height: 1.85 m (6 ft 1 in)
- Positions: Centre-back; left-back

Youth career
- 1995–2000: Saint-Malo
- 2000–2009: Rennes

Senior career*
| Years | Team | Apps | (Gls) |
| 2009–2010 | Rennes | 0 | (0) |
| 2009–2010 | → Le Havre (loan) | 27 | (1) |
| 2010–2012 | Le Havre B | 9 | (1) |
| 2010–2015 | Le Havre | 134 | (4) |
| 2015–2018 | Nice | 65 | (1) |
| 2016 | Nice B | 1 | (0) |
| 2018–2021 | Fulham | 40 | (0) |
| 2021 | → Royal Antwerp (loan) | 13 | (3) |
| 2021–2023 | Strasbourg | 38 | (1) |
| Total | | 317 | (10) |
- * Club domestic league appearances and goals

Maxime Le Marchand (born 11 October 1989) is a French former professional footballer who played as a centre-back.

== Career ==
=== Youth career ===
Le Marchand was born in the port city of Saint-Malo in Brittany and began his youth football career with his hometown club, Saint-Malo. In 2000, he joined the prestigious youth academy of Rennes. Upon arriving at the club, Le Marchand initially joined as a left-sided midfielder, but eventually moved to the left-back role. After ascending the youth ranks, he added the left winger position into his arsenal often playing both positions in dual roles. Between 2006 and 2008, he was frustrated by injuries to his ankle, but was still able to celebrate Rennes's capturing of the under-18 championship for the 2006–07 season, and the Coupe Gambardella in 2008 alongside his Rennes teammates Yann M'Vila, Damien Le Tallec, and Yacine Brahimi.

=== Le Havre ===
Following the 2008–09 season, Le Marchand signed his first professional contract, agreeing to a three-year deal with Rennes. Though he was contracted to Rennes, he was not inserted onto their senior team and, instead, sent on loan to Ligue 2 club Le Havre to receive regular playing time. At Le Havre, he was assigned the number 21 shirt. On 7 August 2009, he made his professional first team debut in the club's 1–1 Ligue 2 away draw with Sedan, playing the entire match. He scored his first competitive goal for the club's first team, on 30 August 2009, in their 1–1 Ligue 2 away draw with Vannes. After a successful season on loan with Le Havre, on 23 June 2010, Le Marchand signed permanently for the club.

=== Nice ===
on 25 June 2015, Le Marchand joined Ligue 1 club Nice On 8 August 2015, he made his competitive debut for Nice in their opening match of the 2015–16 Ligue 1 season, playing the entire match in the 2–1 home loss to Monaco. Seven days later, he scored in the 42nd minute to register his first competitive goal for Nice in the 3–3 Ligue 1 away draw with Troyes.

On 2 November 2017, Le Marchand scored an own goal three minutes into second-half added time in the 2017–18 UEFA Europa League group stage 1–0 loss to Lazio, causing Nice to slump to their sixth straight defeat in all competitions.

=== Fulham ===
On 12 July 2018, Le Marchand signed for newly promoted Premier League side Fulham.

He joined Royal Antwerp on loan until the end of the season on 1 February 2021.

=== Strasbourg ===
On 26 August 2021, he left Fulham to join Strasbourg.

On 26 June 2023, Le Marchand announced his retirement from football due to recurring injuries with his back.

== Career statistics ==
Appearances and goals by club, season and competition
| Club | Season | League | | | National cup | | League cup | | Europe | | Other | | Total | |
| Club | Season | Division | Apps | Goals | Apps | Goals | Apps | Goals | Apps | Goals | Apps | Goals | Apps | Goals |
|---|---|---|---|---|---|---|---|---|---|---|---|---|---|---|
| Le Havre | 2009–10 | Ligue 2 | 27 | 1 | 0 | 0 | 0 | 0 | — | | — | | 27 | 1 |
| Le Havre | 2010–11 | Ligue 2 | 22 | 0 | 0 | 0 | 3 | 0 | — | | — | | 25 | 0 |
| Le Havre | 2011–12 | Ligue 2 | 20 | 1 | 2 | 0 | 1 | 0 | — | | — | | 23 | 1 |
| Le Havre | 2012–13 | Ligue 2 | 28 | 0 | 4 | 0 | 1 | 0 | — | | — | | 33 | 0 |
| Le Havre | 2013–14 | Ligue 2 | 31 | 2 | 0 | 0 | 1 | 0 | — | | — | | 32 | 2 |
| Le Havre | 2014–15 | Ligue 2 | 33 | 1 | 1 | 0 | 1 | 0 | — | | — | | 35 | 1 |
| Le Havre | Total | | 161 | 5 | 7 | 0 | 7 | 0 | — | | — | | 175 | 5 |
| Nice | 2015–16 | Ligue 1 | 26 | 1 | 0 | 0 | 1 | 0 | 0 | 0 | — | | 26 | 1 |
| Nice | 2016–17 | Ligue 1 | 10 | 0 | 1 | 0 | 1 | 0 | 1 (Note: Appearance(s) in UEFA Europa League) | 1 | — | | 13 | 1 |
| Nice | 2017–18 | Ligue 1 | 29 | 0 | 1 | 0 | 2 | 0 | 9 (Note: Four appearances in UEFA Champions League, five appearances in UEFA Europa League) | 0 | — | | 41 | 0 |
| Nice | Total | | 65 | 1 | 1 | 0 | 2 | 0 | 10 | 1 | — | | 78 | 2 |
| Fulham | 2018–19 | Premier League | 26 | 0 | 1 | 0 | 2 | 0 | — | | — | | 29 | 0 |
| Fulham | 2019–20 | Championship | 12 | 0 | 0 | 0 | 1 | 0 | — | | 2 (Note: Appearances in Championship play-offs) | 0 | 15 | 0 |
| Fulham | 2020–21 | Premier League | 2 | 0 | 0 | 0 | 2 | 0 | — | | — | | 4 | 0 |
| Fulham | Total | | 40 | 0 | 1 | 0 | 5 | 0 | — | | 2 | 0 | 48 | 0 |
| Royal Antwerp (loan) | 2020–21 | Belgian Pro League | 13 | 3 | 1 | 0 | — | | 2 | 0 | — | | 16 | 3 |
| Strasbourg | 2021–22 | Ligue 1 | 12 | 1 | 0 | 0 | — | | — | | — | | 12 | 1 |
| Strasbourg | 2022–23 | Ligue 1 | 26 | 0 | 1 | 0 | — | | — | | — | | 27 | 0 |
| Strasbourg | Total | | 38 | 1 | 1 | 0 | 0 | 0 | 0 | 0 | 0 | 0 | 39 | 1 |
| Career total | | | 317 | 10 | 11 | 0 | 14 | 0 | 12 | 1 | 2 | 0 | 356 | 11 |

== Honours ==
Fulham

- EFL Championship play-offs: 2020
