= Valentin Eysseric =

French footballer (born 1992)

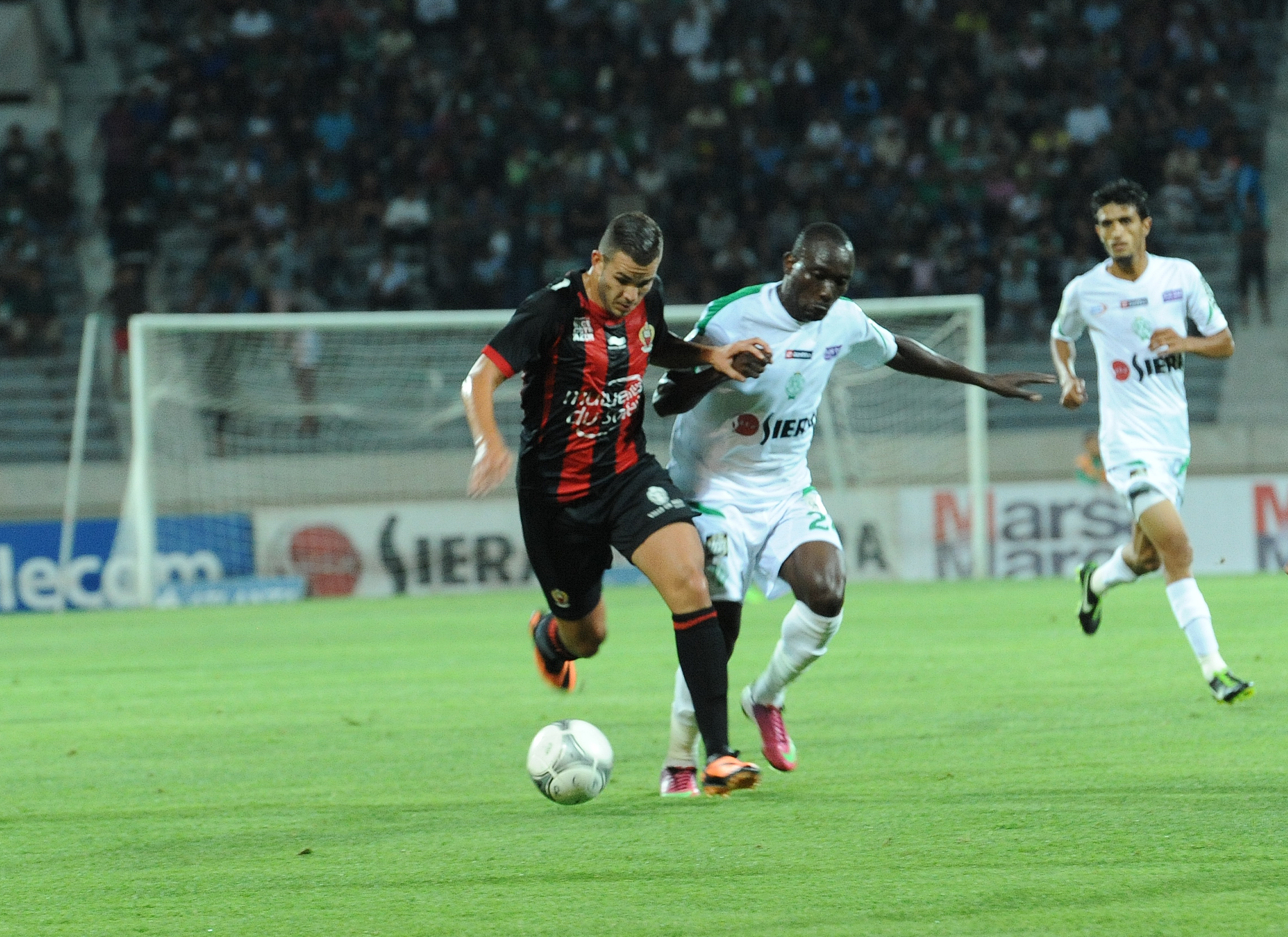
- Valentin Eysseric playing for Nice in 2013.

Personal information
- Date of birth: 25 March 1992 (age 34)
- Place of birth: Aix-en-Provence, France
- Height: 1.81 m (5 ft 11 in)
- Position: Midfielder

Team information
- Current team: UNA Strassen
- Number: 9

Youth career
- 1999–2001: Luynes Sports
- 2001–2002: Aix Université
- 2002–2006: Luynes Sports
- 2006–2007: Aubagne
- 2007–2011: Monaco

Senior career*
| Years | Team | Apps | (Gls) |
| 2011–2013 | Monaco | 17 | (1) |
| 2012–2013 | → Nice (loan) | 24 | (5) |
| 2013–2017 | Nice | 96 | (9) |
| 2015–2016 | → Saint-Étienne (loan) | 29 | (6) |
| 2017–2021 | Fiorentina | 48 | (3) |
| 2019 | → Nantes (loan) | 5 | (1) |
| 2020 | → Verona (loan) | 6 | (0) |
| 2021–2023 | Kasımpaşa | 61 | (8) |
| 2023–2024 | Fatih Karagümrük | 31 | (6) |
| 2024–2026 | Iğdır | 40 | (1) |
| 2026– | UNA Strassen | 3 | (0) |

International career
| 2011 | France U19 | 2 | (0) |
| 2013 | France U20 | 5 | (0) |
| 2013–2014 | France U21 | 4 | (0) |
- * Club domestic league appearances and goals as of 21 September 2026

Valentin Eysseric (born 25 March 1992) is a French professional footballer who plays as an attacking midfielder for Luxembourg National Division club UNA Strassen.

== Club career ==
=== Monaco ===
Eysseric began his career playing for a host of youth clubs before settling at Monaco in 2007. In June 2010, he signed a three-year élite contract, which was due to become a professional contract in June 2013, with the club. In the following season, he was a member of the Monaco under-19 team which won the 2010–11 edition of the Coupe Gambardella. He made his professional debut in Monaco's first competitive fixture of the 2011–12 campaign, a 4–1 loss to Sedan in the Coupe de la Ligue. On 16 September 2011, he scored his first goal for Monaco in a 1–1 draw against Bastia. On 9 December 2011, he scored his first Coupe de France goal in a 2–1 win over La Tour-Saint Clair. Having established himself in the first team, Eysseric run continued before falling out of favour with manager Marco Simone and being sent to the reserves. The next season, he would make two appearances for Monaco before moving to Nice.

=== Nice ===
On 23 August 2012, Eysseric joined Ligue 1 side Nice on a loan deal, until the end of the season. On 2 September 2012, he made his Ligue 1 debut against Bordeaux, a 1–1 draw. In his next appearance on 15 September 2012, he scored his first goal in a 4–2 win over Brest. At Nice, he since established himself in the first team and continued scoring goals including a winner in a 2–1 success over PSG and two goals in two consecutive games in Coupe de la Ligue against Brest and Lyon. In January 2013, he signed for the club on a permanent basis, on a contract keeping him until 2017. Four days before signing a permanent basis, he scored a brace in the first round of Coupe de France, as Nice win 3–2 against Metz. his first game after signing for the club on a permanent basis with a fee of 1.5 million euro, scoring his third goal, as Nice won 5–0 win against Valenciennes.

Eysseric received a straight red card for breaking the leg of Saint-Étienne player Jérémy Clément with a brutal tackle on 3 March 2013, in a Ligue 1 match which Saint-Étienne won 4–0. After the match, he apologised and showed regret for his actions. He also said the tackle ruined his reputation and said: "I am wrong in my head and I still feel guilty, I had no right to try this gesture and I can only apologize again for having injured him [Clément]. I saw [the images] to understand them and I have not found an explanation. But it's over. I will not look at them anymore. It's too hard. The images haunt me. Since Saturday, I've had flashes where I see the ankle of Clément completely at right angles.". His tackle on Clément caused the injured player to be out for the rest of the season. This also led the Ligue 1 disciplinary committee to give Eysseric an eleven-game ban, keeping him out for the rest of the season. Soon after, Eysseric told L'Équipe that he would not appeal his eleven games ban, insisting that was the disciplinary committee's decision.

On 12 February 2017, Eysseric scored a goal and provided an assist for Anastasios Donis in a 2–2 Ligue 1 away draw against Rennes.

=== Fiorentina ===
On 9 August 2017, Eysseric signed with Serie A club Fiorentina on a four-year deal. Fiorentina paid a reported transfer fee of €4 million to Nice.

==== Nantes loan ====
On 31 January 2019, the last day of the 2018–19 winter transfer window, Eysseric returned to France joining FC Nantes on a loan deal until the end of the season. Nantes also secured an purchase option to make the signing permanent.

==== Hellas Verona loan ====
On 31 January 2020, Eysseric joined Hellas Verona on loan until 30 June 2020.

=== Kasımpaşa ===
On 23 July 2021, he signed with Kasımpaşa in Turkey.

== International career ==
Eysseric is a France youth international having earned caps at under-19, France U20 and France U21 levels.

== Career statistics ==
=== Club ===
As of match played 9 December 2023

Appearances and goals by club, season and competition
| Club | Season | League | | | Cup | | Europe | | Other | | Total | |
| Club | Season | Division | Apps | Goals | Apps | Goals | Apps | Goals | Apps | Goals | Apps | Goals |
|---|---|---|---|---|---|---|---|---|---|---|---|---|
| Monaco | 2011–12 | Ligue 2 | 16 | 1 | 2 | 0 | – | | – | | 18 | 1 |
| Monaco | 2012–13 | Ligue 2 | 1 | 0 | 1 | 0 | – | | – | | 2 | 0 |
| Monaco | Total | | 17 | 1 | 3 | 0 | – | | – | | 20 | 1 |
| Nice | 2012–13 | Ligue 1 | 24 | 5 | 4 | 4 | – | | – | | 28 | 9 |
| Nice | 2013–14 | Ligue 1 | 29 | 3 | 2 | 0 | 2 | 0 | – | | 33 | 3 |
| Nice | 2014–15 | Ligue 1 | 36 | 2 | 2 | 0 | – | | – | | 38 | 2 |
| Nice | 2015–16 | Ligue 1 | 1 | 0 | 0 | 0 | – | | – | | 1 | 0 |
| Nice | 2016–17 | Ligue 1 | 29 | 4 | 4 | 0 | – | | – | | 33 | 4 |
| Nice | 2017–18 | Ligue 1 | 1 | 0 | 0 | 0 | 2 | 0 | – | | 3 | 0 |
| Nice | Total | | 120 | 14 | 12 | 4 | 4 | 0 | – | | 136 | 18 |
| Saint-Étienne (loan) | 2015–16 | Ligue 1 | 29 | 6 | 4 | 1 | 6 | 1 | – | | 39 | 8 |
| Fiorentina | 2017–18 | Serie A | 21 | 1 | 2 | 0 | – | | – | | 23 | 1 |
| Fiorentina | 2018–19 | Serie A | 8 | 0 | 0 | 0 | – | | – | | 8 | 0 |
| Fiorentina | 2019–20 | Serie A | 3 | 0 | 0 | 0 | – | | – | | 3 | 0 |
| Fiorentina | 2020–21 | Serie A | 16 | 2 | 2 | 0 | – | | – | | 18 | 2 |
| Fiorentina | Total | | 48 | 3 | 4 | 0 | 0 | 0 | – | | 52 | 3 |
| Nantes (loan) | 2018–19 | Ligue 1 | 5 | 1 | 2 | 0 | 0 | 0 | – | | 7 | 1 |
| Verona (loan) | 2019–20 | Serie A | 6 | 0 | 0 | 0 | – | | – | | 6 | 0 |
| Kasımpaşa | 2021–22 | Süper Lig | 29 | 5 | 3 | 1 | – | | – | | 32 | 6 |
| Kasımpaşa | 2022–23 | Süper Lig | 32 | 3 | 2 | 0 | – | | – | | 34 | 3 |
| Kasımpaşa | Total | | 61 | 8 | 5 | 1 | – | | – | | 66 | 9 |
| Fatih Karagümrük | 2023–24 | Süper Lig | 10 | 3 | 0 | 0 | — | | — | | 10 | 3 |
| Career total | | | 296 | 36 | 30 | 6 | 10 | 1 | 0 | 0 | 336 | 43 |
