= Olivier Boscagli =

French footballer (born 1997)

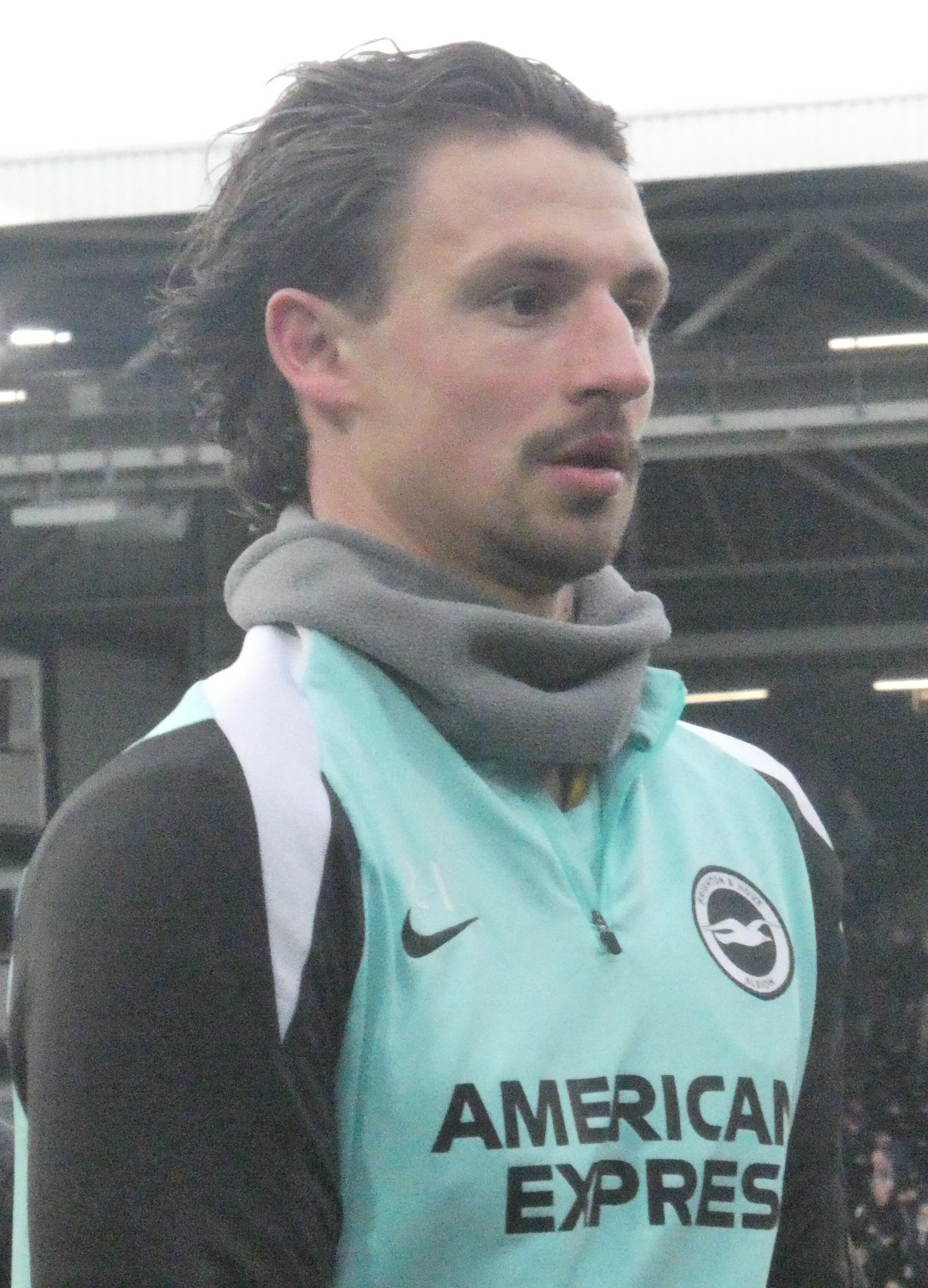
- Boscagli with Brighton & Hove Albion in 2026

Personal information
- Full name: Olivier Maxime Boscagli
- Date of birth: 18 November 1997 (age 29)
- Place of birth: Monte Carlo, Monaco
- Height: 1.81 m (5 ft 11 in)
- Positions: Centre-back; left-back

Team information
- Current team: Brighton & Hove Albion
- Number: 21

Youth career
- 2003–2011: FC Beausoleil
- 2011: Nice
- 2011–2013: FC Beausoleil
- 2013–2015: Nice

Senior career*
Years	Team	Apps	(Gls)
2014–2017	Nice II	44	(0)
2015–2019	Nice	27	(1)
2017–2018	→ Nîmes (loan)	28	(0)
2019–2025	PSV	140	(11)
2025–	Brighton & Hove Albion	18	(0)

International career
2014	France U17	3	(0)
2015	France U18	5	(0)
2015–2016	France U19	16	(1)
2016–2017	France U20	10	(0)
2017–2018	France U21	5	(0)
- * Club domestic league appearances and goals as of 22 November 2026

Olivier Maxime Boscagli (born 18 November 1997) is a professional footballer who plays as a centre-back or left-back for Premier League club Brighton & Hove Albion. Born in Monaco, he has represented France at youth level.

== Club career ==
=== Nice ===
Boscagli is a youth exponent from OGC Nice. He made his Ligue 1 debut on 25 April 2015 against Stade Rennais playing the first 84 minutes in a 2–1 away defeat. He scored his first goal in Nice's 1–0 win over Montpellier on 18 December, becoming the youngest player to score in the Ligue 1 in the 2015–16 season.

=== PSV ===
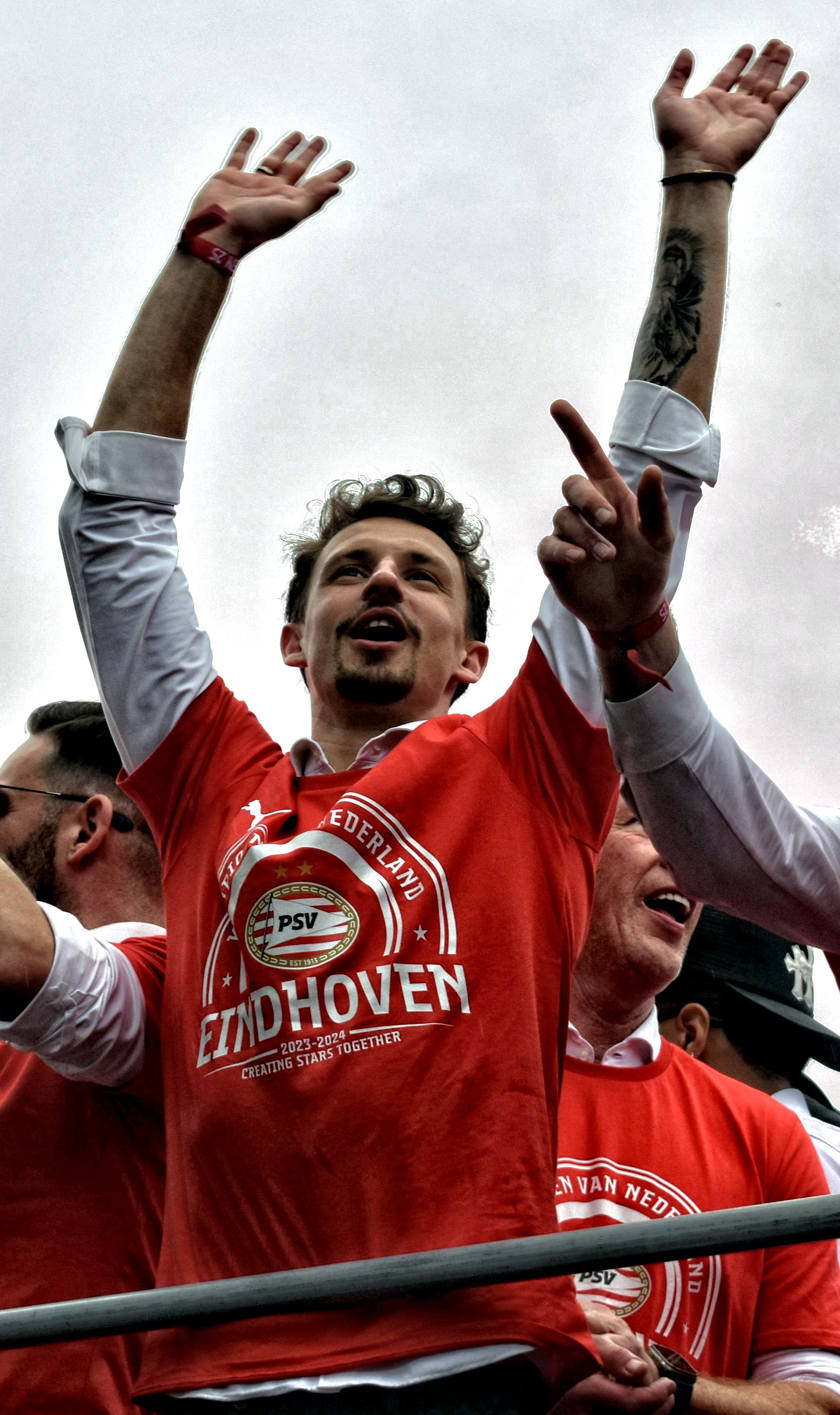
Boscagli with PSV in 2024.

On 17 July 2019, Boscagli moved to the Netherlands, joining Eredivisie side PSV Eindhoven. In six seasons at the club, he made over 200 appearances and won two Eredivisie titles, two Johan Cruyff Shields and a KNVB Cup.

=== Brighton and Hove Albion ===
On 2 July 2025, Boscagli joined Premier League club Brighton & Hove Albion, signing a five-year contract. He scored on his Albion debut, opening the scoring with a deflected strike in an eventual 6–0 away win over Oxford United in the EFL Cup.

== International career ==
Boscagli was born in Monaco, and is of French descent through his mother with roots in Arras. He represented France at the under-17, under-18, under-19 and under-20 levels.

== Career statistics ==
As of match played 22 November 2026

Appearances and goals by club, season and competition
Club	Season	League			National cup (Note: Includes Coupe de France, KNVB Cup, FA Cup)		League cup (Note: Includes Coupe de la Ligue, EFL Cup)		Europe		Other		Total	
Club	Season	Division	Apps	Goals	Apps	Goals	Apps	Goals	Apps	Goals	Apps	Goals	Apps	Goals
Nice	2014–15	Ligue 1	2	0	0	0	0	0	—		—		2	0
Nice	2015–16	Ligue 1	11	1	1	0	1	0	—		—		13	1
Nice	2016–17	Ligue 1	1	0	0	0	1	0	2 (Note: Appearances in UEFA Europa League)	0	—		4	0
Nice	2017–18	Ligue 1	0	0	—		—		1 (Note: Appearance(s) in UEFA Champions League)	0	—		1	0
Nice	2018–19	Ligue 1	13	0	1	0	1	0	—		—		15	0
Nice	Total		27	1	2	0	3	0	3	0	—		35	1
Nîmes (loan)	2017–18	Ligue 2	28	0	1	0	0	0	—		—		29	0
PSV	2019–20	Eredivisie	12	0	1	0	—		4	0	1 (Note: Appearance in Johan Cruyff Shield)	0	18	0
PSV	2020–21	Eredivisie	30	2	2	0	—		10	0	—		42	2
PSV	2021–22	Eredivisie	28	4	3	0	—		14 (Note: Five appearances in UEFA Champions League, six appearances in UEFA Europa League, one appearance in UEFA Europa Conference League)	0	1	0	46	4
PSV	2022–23	Eredivisie	7	1	1	0	—		0	0	—		8	1
PSV	2023–24	Eredivisie	33	3	2	0	—		11	0	1	0	47	3
PSV	2024–25	Eredivisie	30	1	2	0	—		11	0	0	0	43	1
PSV	Total		140	11	11	0	—		50	0	3	0	204	11
Brighton & Hove Albion	2025–26	Premier League	7	0	2	0	3	1	—		—		12	1
Brighton & Hove Albion	2026–27	Premier League	11	0	0	0	2	0	5 (Note: Appearances in UEFA Conference League)	1	—		18	1
Brighton & Hove Albion	Total		18	0	2	0	5	1	5	1	—		30	2
Career total			213	12	16	0	8	1	58	1	3	0	298	14

== Honours ==
PSV

- Eredivisie: 2023–24, 2024–25
- KNVB Cup: 2022–23
- Johan Cruyff Shield: 2021, 2023

France U19

- UEFA European Under-19 Championship: 2016

Individual

- Eredivisie Team of the Month: August 2024
