= Vincent Koziello =

French footballer (born 1995)

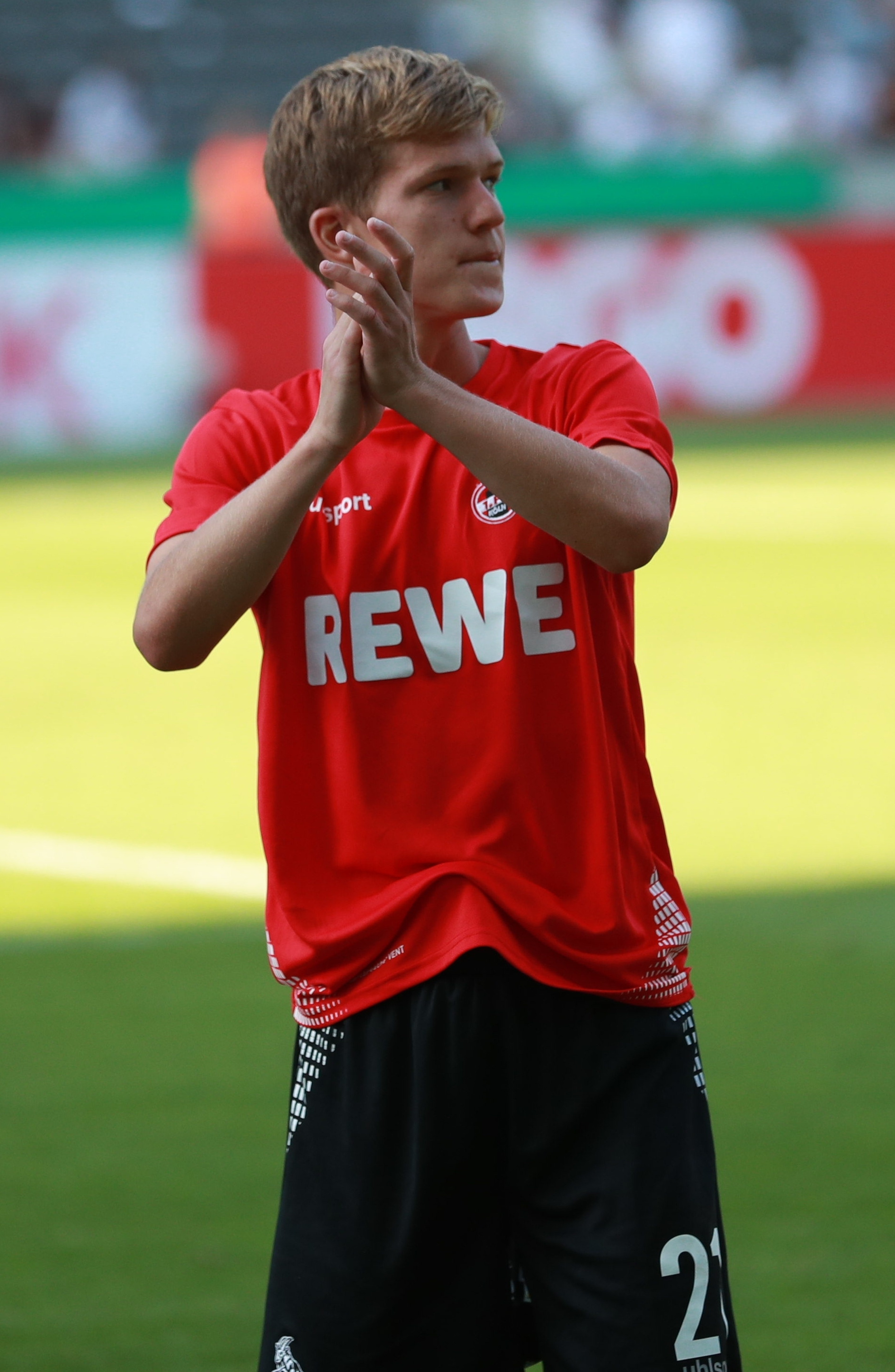
- Koziello, playing for Köln (2018)

Personal information
- Full name: Vincent Edouard André Koziello
- Date of birth: 28 October 1995 (age 31)
- Place of birth: Grasse, France
- Height: 1.68 m (5 ft 6 in)
- Position: Midfielder

Team information
- Current team: Kathmandu Rayzrs

Youth career
- 2001–2006: St O Roquettan
- 2006–2013: Cannes
- 2013–2014: Nice

Senior career*
Years	Team	Apps	(Gls)
2013–2017	Nice II	32	(2)
2014–2018	Nice	84	(4)
2018–2021	1. FC Köln	26	(1)
2019–2020	1. FC Köln II	2	(0)
2020	→ Paris FC (loan)	6	(0)
2020–2021	→ Nacional (loan)	14	(0)
2021–2024	Oostende	17	(0)
2023	→ Virton (loan)	10	(0)
2025–	Kathmandu Rayzrs	6	(1)

International career
2013	France U19	1	(0)
2015	France U20	2	(0)
2016	France U21	4	(2)
- * Club domestic league appearances and goals as of 19 April 2025

Vincent Edouard André Koziello (born 28 October 1995) is a French professional footballer who plays as a midfielder for Nepal Super League club Kathmandu Rayzrs.

== Club career ==
Koziello is a youth exponent from OGC Nice. He made his Ligue 1 debut on 1 November 2014 against Olympique Lyonnais, replacing Grégoire Puel after 72 minutes in a 1–3 home defeat.

In January 2018, he joined Bundesliga side 1. FC Köln on a 4 1/2-year contract until 2022. The transfer paid to Nice was reported as €3.3 million plus potential bonuses.

On 28 April 2018, he came off the bench as Köln lost 3–2 to SC Freiburg which confirmed Köln’s relegation from the Bundesliga.

On 11 January 2023, Koziello was loaned by Virton.

On 12 March 2025, it was announced that Koziello joined Nepalese club Kathmandu Rayzrs.

== Personal life ==
Koziello was born in France, and is of Polish descent through his paternal grandfather. He was a youth international for France.

== Career statistics ==
As of 16 April 2019

Appearances and goals by club, season and competition
Club	Season	League			National cup (Note: Includes Coupe de France, DFB-Pokal)		League cup (Note: Includes Coupe de la Ligue)		Continental		Total	
Club	Season	Division	Apps	Goals	Apps	Goals	Apps	Goals	Apps	Goals	Apps	Goals
Nice	2014–15	Ligue 1	7	0	0	0	1	0	—		8	0
Nice	2015–16	Ligue 1	35	3	1	0	1	0	—		37	3
Nice	2016–17	Ligue 1	27	1	1	0	1	0	5 (Note: Appearances in UEFA Europa League)	0	34	1
Nice	2017–18	Ligue 1	15	0	0	0	1	0	7 (Note: Three appearances in UEFA Champions League, four appearances in UEFA Europa League)	0	23	0
Nice	Total		84	4	2	0	4	0	12	0	102	4
1. FC Köln	2017–18	Bundesliga	12	1	0	0	—		—		12	1
1. FC Köln	2018–19	2. Bundesliga	10	0	1	1	—		—		11	1
1. FC Köln	Total		22	1	1	1	—		—		23	2
Career total			106	5	3	1	4	0	12	0	125	6

== Honours ==
1. FC Köln

- 2. Bundesliga: 2018–19
