= Yoan Cardinale =

French professional footballer (born 1994)

Personal information
- Full name: Yoan Cardinale
- Date of birth: 27 March 1994 (age 32)
- Place of birth: La Ciotat, France
- Height: 1.81 m (5 ft 11 in)
- Position: Goalkeeper

Team information
- Current team: Toulon

Youth career
- 1999–2003: AS Saint-Cyr
- 2003–2007: Marseille
- 2007–2009: SC Air Bel
- 2009–2015: Nice

Senior career*
Years	Team	Apps	(Gls)
2012–2015	Nice B	39	(0)
2015–2021	Nice	75	(0)
2022–2024	Toulon	27	(0)
- * Club domestic league appearances and goals as of 08:53, 1 April 2024 (UTC)

Yoan Cardinale (born 27 March 1994) is a French professional footballer who plays as a goalkeeper for SC Toulon.

== Career ==
Cardinale is a youth product of Nice. He made his Ligue 1 debut on 18 October 2015 against Rennes, playing the full game. He played for Ligue 1 club Nice until the end of the 2020–21 season.

On 24 August 2022, Cardinale joined SC Toulon on a free transfer, after a year without a club.

== Career statistics ==
As of match played 27 April 2024

Appearances and goals by club, season and competition
Club	Season	League			Cup		League Cup		Europe		Total	
Club	Season	Division	Apps	Goals	Apps	Goals	Apps	Goals	Apps	Goals	Apps	Goals
Nice B	2012–13	CFA 2	3	0	—		—		—		3	0
Nice B	2013–14	CFA	12	0	—		—		—		12	0
Nice B	2014–15	CFA	21	0	—		—		—		21	0
Nice B	2015–16	CFA	1	0	—		—		—		1	0
Nice B	2018–19	Championnat National 2	1	0	—		—		—		1	0
Nice B	2018–19	Championnat National 3	1	0	—		—		—		1	0
Nice B	Total		39	0	—		—		—		39	0
Nice	2013–14	Ligue 1	0	0	0	0	0	0	—		0	0
Nice	2014–15	Ligue 1	0	0	0	0	0	0	—		0	0
Nice	2015–16	Ligue 1	26	0	0	0	1	0	—		27	0
Nice	2016–17	Ligue 1	36	0	0	0	0	0	5	0	41	0
Nice	2017–18	Ligue 1	10	0	1	0	1	0	8	0	20	0
Nice	2018–19	Ligue 1	3	0	0	0	0	0	—		3	0
Nice	2019–20	Ligue 1	0	0	0	0	0	0	—		0	0
Nice	2020–21	Ligue 1	0	0	0	0	—		1	0	0	0
Nice	Total		75	0	1	0	2	0	14	0	91	0
Toulon	2022–23	Championnat National 2	13	0	0	0	—		—		13	0
Toulon	2023–24	Championnat National 2	14	0	0	0	—		—		14	0
Toulon	Total		27	0	0	0	—		—		27	0
Career total			141	0	1	0	2	0	14	0	158	0
