= Wallyson Mallmann =

Brazilian footballer

Personal information
- Full name: Wallyson Teixeira Mallmann
- Date of birth: 16 February 1994 (age 32)
- Place of birth: Mato Grosso do Sul, Brazil
- Height: 1.83 m (6 ft 0 in)
- Position: Midfielder

Youth career
- Espírito Santo SE
- → FC Basel (loan)
- → Manchester City (loan)
- → Sporting (loan)

Senior career*
Years	Team	Apps	(Gls)
2013–2014	Espírito Santo SE	0	(0)
2013–2014	→ Sporting B (loan)	26	(5)
2014–2017	Sporting	0	(0)
2015–2016	→ OGC Nice (loan)	17	(0)
2016–2017	→ Standard Liège (loan)	0	(0)
2017	Moreirense	0	(0)
2017–2019	Sporting	0	(0)
2017–2018	→ Sporting B	7	(0)
2018	→ Vitória de Setúbal (loan)	7	(0)
2018–2019	→ Estoril (loan)	10	(0)
2020–2022	Leixões	3	(0)
2022–2023	Marinhense	9	(1)
- * Club domestic league appearances and goals as of 22 January 2023

Wallyson Teixeira Mallmann (born 16 February 1994) is a Brazilian midfielder of German heritage.

== Club career ==
Mallmann has played in the youth academies of FC Basel and Manchester City before joining Sporting B on loan. He made his debut for the club in a 4–0 home win against GD Chaves coming as a 78th-minute substitute for Luka Stojanović. He scored his first goal for the club in a 4–1 away loss against Farense. It was also reported that Barcelona were after signing Mallmann. Following the suspension of Adrien Silva, he was included in Sporting CP's squad against Benfica on 28 February 2014.

On 12 August 2015, Mallmann was loaned to Ligue 1 side OGC Nice.

On 31 August 2016, Mallmann joined Belgian club Standard Liège on a season-long loan deal.

On 31 January 2017, Standard Liège then decided to end his loan period. On the same day, Portuguese club Moreirense then reached an agreement with Sporting for the transfer of the player Mallmann.
