= Jonathan Correia Da Fonseca =

Monégasque footballer

Jonathan Correia
Personal information
- Full name: Jonathan Correia Da Fonseca
- Date of birth: 13 February 1994 (age 32)
- Place of birth: Monaco
- Height: 1.75 m (5 ft 9 in)
- Position: Left-back

Youth career
- –2015: Nice

Senior career*
Years	Team	Apps	(Gls)
2014–2015	Nice B	25	(0)
2015–2016	Nice	4	(0)
2016–2017	Guingamp	0	(0)
2017–2018	Monaco	0	(0)
2018–2019	Cap d'Ail	0	(0)
- * Club domestic league appearances and goals as of 03:36, 20 August 2016 (UTC) ‡ National team caps and goals as of 15 August 2015

Jonathan Correia Da Fonseca (born 13 February 1994) is a Monégasque former footballer who played as a left-back.

== Club career ==
Correia Da Fonseca is a youth exponent from OGC Nice. He made his Ligue 1 debut on 15 August 2015 against Troyes AC. He played the full game.
