= Albert Rafetraniaina =

Malagasy professional footballer (born 1996)

Personal information
- Full name: Albert Tokinirina Rafetraniaina
- Date of birth: 9 September 1996 (age 30)
- Place of birth: Ambohitrony, Madagascar
- Height: 1.76 m (5 ft 9 in)
- Position: Defensive midfielder

Youth career
- 2007–2010: SC d'Air Bel
- 2010–2012: Nice

Senior career*
Years	Team	Apps	(Gls)
2012–2019	Nice B	84	(0)
2012–2019	Nice	27	(0)
2016	→ Red Star (loan)	3	(0)
2019–2020	Bisceglie	25	(0)
2020–2022	Molfetta Calcio	33	(0)

International career^{‡}
2014	France U18	1	(0)
2015	France U20	2	(0)
2018–	Madagascar	1	(0)
- * Club domestic league appearances and goals as of 12 November 2023 ‡ National team caps and goals as of 27 March 2018

Albert Tokinirina Rafetraniaina (born 9 September 1996) is a Malagasy professional footballer who plays as a defensive midfielder.

== Career ==
Rafetraniaina made his professional debut on 6 October 2012 appearing as a substitute in a 3–1 defeat to Reims.

On 16 August 2019, he signed for Serie C team Bisceglie. He debuted following 25 August to become first Malagasy footballer to have played professionally in Italy.

== International career ==
A former youth international for France, Rafetraniaina represented the Madagascar national football team in a friendly 0–0 tie with Togo on 21 March 2018.

== Career statistics ==
=== Club ===
As of 17 December 2016

Appearances and goals by club, season and competition
Club	Season	League			Cup (Note: Includes Coupe de France, Coupe de la Ligue, Trophée des champions)		Europe (Note: Includes UEFA Super Cup)		Total	
Club	Season	Division	Apps	Goals	Apps	Goals	Apps	Goals	Apps	Goals
Nice	2012–13	Ligue 1	1	0	1	0	—		2	0
Nice	2013–14	Ligue 1	4	0	—		—		4	0
Nice	2014–15	Ligue 1	21	0	—		—		21	0
Nice	2015–16	Ligue 1	1	0	—		—		1	0
Nice	Total		27	0	1	0	—		28	0
Red Star	2015–16	Ligue 2	3	0	—		—		3	0
Career total			30	0	1	0	0	0	31	0
