= Julien Vercauteren =

Belgian footballer

Personal information
- Date of birth: 12 January 1993 (age 33)
- Place of birth: Berchem-Sainte-Agathe, Belgium
- Height: 1.71 m (5 ft 7 in)
- Position: Winger

Youth career
- 2000–2002: SCUP Jette
- 2002–2003: FC Strombeek
- 2003–2009: Anderlecht
- 2009–2010: KV Mechelen
- 2010–2013: Lierse

Senior career*
Years	Team	Apps	(Gls)
2013–2014	Lierse	27	(2)
2014–2017	Nice	9	(0)
2014–2017	Nice B	14	(2)
2016	→ Westerlo (loan)	3	(0)
2017	RNK Split	0	(0)
2017–2019	Union SG	35	(7)
2019	Virton	15	(3)
2019–2020	RWD Molenbeek	10	(0)
2021	Marino	10	(1)
2022	Houtvenne	7	(0)
2022–2023	Lokeren-Temse	23	(3)
- * Club domestic league appearances and goals as of 20:20, 24 October 2023 (UTC)

Julien Vercauteren (born 12 January 1993) is a Belgian professional footballer who plays as a winger. Besides Belgium, he has played in France, Croatia, and Spain.

== Career ==
Vercauteren made his top flight debut during the 2012–13 season.

He joined Ligue 1 club OGC Nice in June 2014.

Between 2016 and 2020 he had spells with Westerlo, Union SG, Virton and RWD Molenbeek. With Union in the Proximus League, now Challenger Pro League, he had his best period scoring eight goals and six assists his first season.

Julien is a distant relative of Franky Vercauteren.
