= Paul Baysse =

French footballer (born 1988)

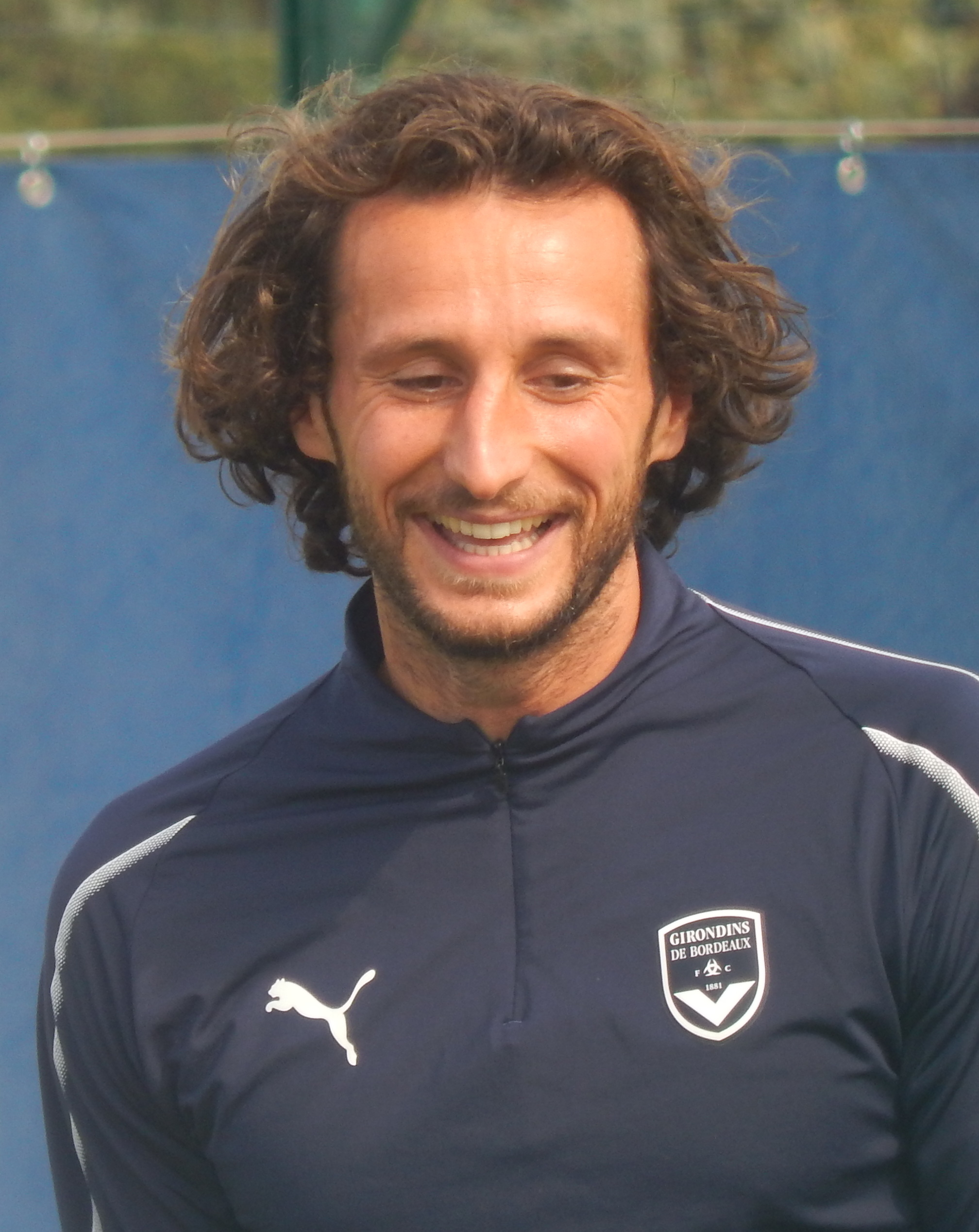
- Baysse with Bordeaux in 2018

Personal information
- Full name: Paul Adrien Baysse
- Date of birth: 18 May 1988 (age 38)
- Place of birth: Talence, France
- Height: 1.85 m (6 ft 1 in)
- Position: Defender

Team information
- Current team: Bordeaux (assistant coach)

Youth career
- 1994–1996: AS Saint-Aubin de Médoc
- 1996–2000: FC Saint-Médard-en-Jalles
- 2000–2007: Bordeaux

Senior career*
Years	Team	Apps	(Gls)
2007–2008	Bordeaux	0	(0)
2007–2008	→ Sedan (loan)	22	(2)
2008–2010	Sedan	58	(4)
2010–2013	Brest	83	(4)
2013–2014	Saint-Étienne B	3	(0)
2013–2016	Saint-Étienne	9	(1)
2015–2016	→ Nice (loan)	30	(0)
2016–2017	Nice	22	(2)
2017–2018	Málaga	15	(1)
2018–2022	Bordeaux	42	(2)
2018–2019	→ Caen (loan)	20	(0)
2022	Bordeaux B	2	(0)
2024	Bordeaux B	3	(0)
Total		309	(16)

International career
2010	France U20	3	(0)
2008–2011	France U21	6	(1)
- * Club domestic league appearances and goals

Paul Adrien Baysse (born 18 May 1988) is a French football coach and former professional player who is an assistant coach of Régional 1 club Bordeaux.

== Club career ==
Born in Talence, Baysse played as a defender for Bordeaux, Sedan, Brest, Saint-Étienne, Nice and Málaga.

On 16 August 2018, Baysse was loaned to Ligue 1 side Caen.

On 5 September 2022, Baysse announced his retirement from football. On 28 August 2024, he came out of retirement to sign for first club Bordeaux, who had just been relegated to the Championnat National 2.

== International career ==
Baysse played at youth level for France from 2008 to 2011.

== Coaching career ==
In October 2026, Baysse returned to Bordeaux in the role of assistant coach following the club's administrative relegation to Régional 1.
