= Bryan Constant =

French footballer (born 1994)

Personal information
- Date of birth: 27 March 1994 (age 32)
- Place of birth: Fréjus, France
- Height: 1.83 m (6 ft 0 in)
- Position: Forward

Team information
- Current team: Schiltigheim

Youth career
- 2000–2001: Fréjus Saint-Raphaël
- 2001–2009: Stade Saint-Raphaël
- 2009–2013: Nice

Senior career*
Years	Team	Apps	(Gls)
2012–2017	Nice B	39	(6)
2013–2017	Nice	5	(0)
2016	→ Fréjus Saint-Raphaël (loan)	9	(1)
2017–2018	AS Maximoise		
2018–2020	Sedan	35	(3)
2020–	Schiltigheim	5	(0)

International career
2011	France U18	2	(1)
2012	France U19	3	(0)
- * Club domestic league appearances and goals as of 24 October 2020

Bryan Constant (born 27 March 1994) is a French professional footballer who plays for Schiltigheim as a forward.

== Career ==
Constant made his Ligue 1 debut with OGC Nice in the opening game of the 2013–14 season on 10 August 2013 against Olympique Lyon coming on after 70 minutes for Jérémy Pied.

He is the younger brother of fellow footballer Kévin Constant.
