= Vincent Marcel =

French footballer (born 1997)

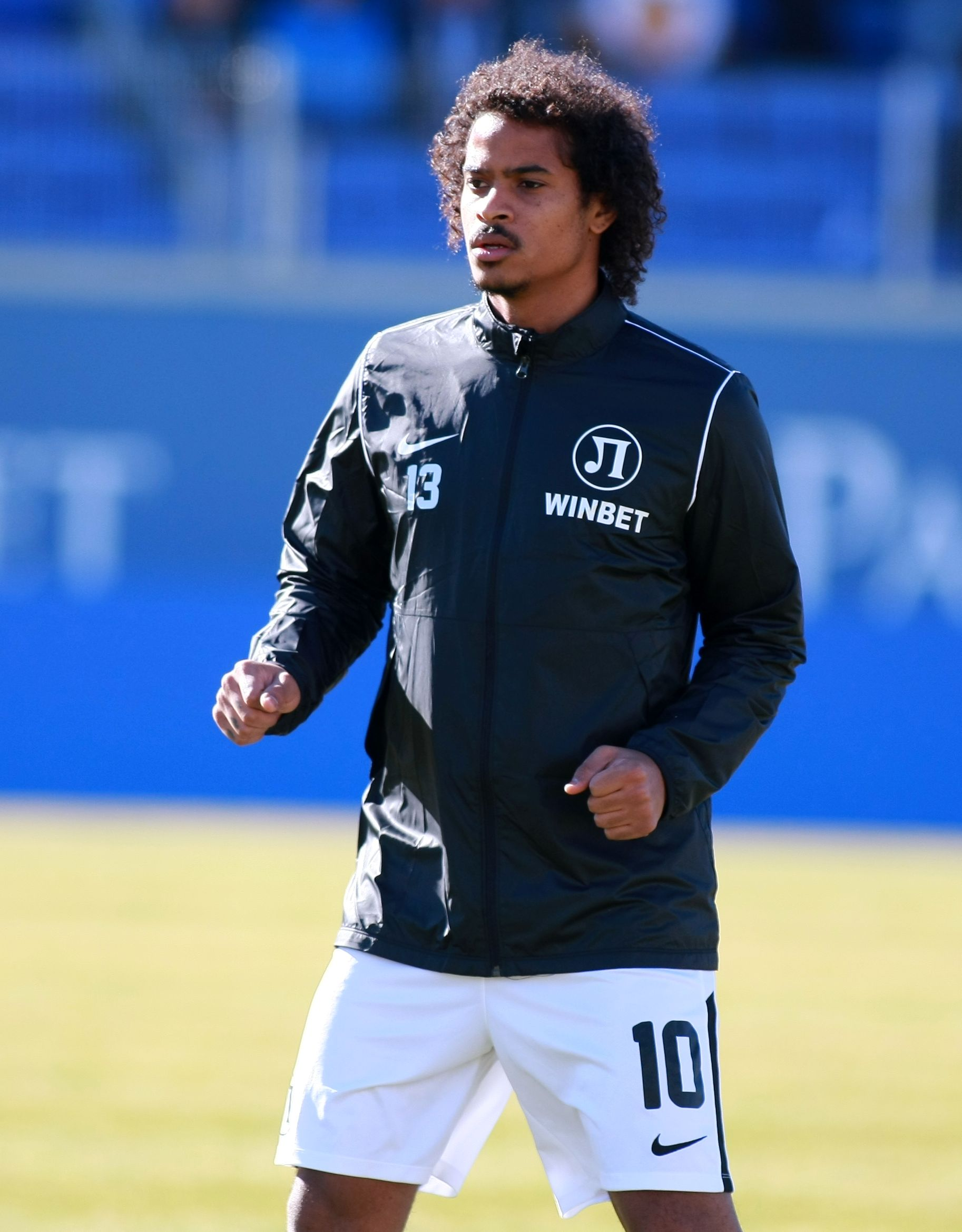
- Marcel with Lokomotiv Plovdiv in 2022

Personal information
- Date of birth: 9 April 1997 (age 29)
- Place of birth: Basse-Terre, Guadeloupe
- Height: 1.80 m (5 ft 11 in)
- Position: Midfielder

Team information
- Current team: Valenciennes
- Number: 21

Youth career
- 2007–2008: La Gauloise de Basse-Terre
- 2009–2015: Le Havre
- 2015–2016: Nice

Senior career*
Years	Team	Apps	(Gls)
2015–2019	Nice II	43	(5)
2016–2019	Nice	8	(0)
2018–2019	→ Troyes (loan)	8	(0)
2019–2020	Vitória Guimarães B	12	(2)
2021–2022	Lokomotiv Plovdiv	22	(2)
2022–2023	Hebar Pazardzhik	26	(2)
2023–2024	Orléans	18	(2)
2024–2025	Nîmes	26	(1)
2025–2026	Villefranche	23	(0)
2026–	Valenciennes	5	(1)

International career
2017	France U19	3	(0)
2016	France U20	2	(1)
- * Club domestic league appearances and goals as of 3 September 2026

Vincent Marcel (born 9 April 1997) is a French professional footballer who plays as a midfielder for Ligue 3 club Valenciennes.

== Club career ==
Marcel is a youth exponent from Le Havre. He made his Ligue 1 debut for Nice on 14 August 2016 against Rennes.

On 2 September 2019, Vitória de Guimarães announced the signing of Marcel.

In July 2021 he joined Bulgarian club Lokomotiv Plovdiv.

In August 2022 Marcel signed a contract with another Bulgarian team - newly promoted Hebar Pazardzhik.

On 8 July 2025, Marcel signed for Villefranche.

== Career statistics ==
=== Club ===
As of 1 July 2019

Appearances and goals by club, season and competition
Club	Season	League			Cup (Note: Appearance in Coupe de France)		League Cup		Europe (Note: Appearance in UEFA Europa League and UEFA Champions League)		Other		Total	
Club	Season	League	Apps	Goals	Apps	Goals	Apps	Goals	Apps	Goals	Apps	Goals	Apps	Goals
Nice	2016–17	Ligue 1	6	0	1	0	1	0	2	0	—		10	0
Nice	2017–18	Ligue 1	2	0	0	0	0	0	3	1	—		5	1
Nice	Total		8	0	1	0	1	0	5	1	0	0	15	1
Troyes	2018–19	Ligue 2	8	0	1	0	0	0	0	0	—		9	0
Career total			16	0	2	0	1	0	5	1	0	0	24	1
