= 2014–15 OGC Nice season =

Nice
2014–15 season
- Chairman: Jean-Pierre Rivère
- Manager: Claude Puel
- Stadium: Allianz Riviera
- Ligue 1: 11th
- Coupe de France: Round of 64 (vs. Valenciennes FC)
- Coupe de la Ligue: Round of 32 (vs. FC Metz)
- Top goalscorer: League: Carlos Eduardo (7); All: Carlos Eduardo (7)
- Highest home attendance: 25,407 vs Marseille, 24 January 2015
- Lowest home attendance: 9,560 vs FC Metz, 29 October 2014
Home colours	Away colours	Third colours

The 2014–15 OGC Nice season was the 110th professional season of the club since its creation in 1904.

== Players ==
=== First team squad ===
French teams are limited to four players without EU citizenship. Hence, the squad list includes only the principal nationality of each player; several non-European players on the squad have dual citizenship with an EU country. Also, players from the ACP countries—countries in Africa, the Caribbean, and the Pacific that are signatories to the Cotonou Agreement—are not counted against non-EU quotas due to the Kolpak ruling.

Note: Flags indicate national team as defined under FIFA eligibility rules; some limited exceptions apply. Players may hold more than one non-FIFA nationality.

No.	Pos.	Nation	Player
1	GK	FRA	Mouez Hassen
3	MF	BRA	Carlos Eduardo
5	DF	FRA	Kévin Gomis
6	MF	FRA	Didier Digard (captain)
7	MF	BEL	Julien Vercauteren
8	MF	MLI	Mahamane Traoré
9	FW	FRA	Xavier Pentecôte
10	MF	FRA	Valentin Eysseric
11	MF	FRA	Éric Bauthéac
13	MF	SWE	Niklas Hult
14	MF	FRA	Alassane Pléa
15	DF	FRA	Grégoire Puel
16	GK	FRA	Simon Pouplin
18	FW	FRA	Neal Maupay

No.	Pos.	Nation	Player
19	DF	FRA	Jordan Amavi
20	DF	SEN	Souleymane Diawara
21	DF	GAB	Lloyd Palun
22	MF	FRA	Nampalys Mendy
23	FW	FRA	Alexy Bosetti
24	MF	FRA	Mathieu Bodmer
25	DF	HAI	Romain Genevois
27	FW	FRA	Bryan Constant
28	MF	FRA	Fabien Dao Castellana
30	GK	FRA	Joris Delle
31	DF	SEN	Moussa M'Bow
33	MF	FRA	Albert Rafetraniaina
34	FW	FRA	Sada Thioub
40	GK	FRA	Yoan Cardinale

=== Out on loan ===
Note: Flags indicate national team as defined under FIFA eligibility rules; some limited exceptions apply. Players may hold more than one non-FIFA nationality.

No.	Pos.	Nation	Player
—	DF	FRA	Lucas Rougeaux (on loan to Fréjus Saint-Raphaël)
—	MF	FRA	Jérémy Pied (on loan to EA Guingamp)

No.	Pos.	Nation	Player
—	FW	FRA	Jordan Astier (on loan to Fréjus Saint-Raphaël)
—	FW	FRA	Alexandre Mendy (on loan to Nîmes Olympique)

=== Transfers ===
==== Transfers in ====
Date	Pos.	Player	Age	Moved from	Fee	Notes
1 July 2014	MF	(Sweden) Niklas Hult	24	(Sweden) Elfsborg	€950,000	
1 July 2014	MF	(Belgium) Julien Vercauteren	21	(Belgium) Lierse S.K.	Undisclosed	
5 August 2014	DF	(Senegal) Souleymane Diawara	35	(France) Marseille	Free Transfer	
7 August 2014	GK	(France) Simon Pouplin	29	(France) Sochaux	Free Transfer	
28 August 2014	MF	(France) Alassane Pléa	21	(France) Lyon	€600,000	
15 January 2015	MF	(France) Hatem Ben Arfa	27	(England) Newcastle United	Free Transfer	

==== Loans in ====
Date	Pos.	Player	Age	Loaned from	Loan expires	Fee	Notes
1 September 2014	MF	(Brazil) Carlos Eduardo	24	(Portugal) F.C. Porto	30 June 2015		

==== Transfers out ====
Date	Pos.	Player	Age	Moved to	Fee	Notes
1 July 2014	FW	(Ivory Coast) Abraham Gneki Guié	27	(Cyprus) Apollon Limassol	€475,000	
1 July 2014	GK	(France) Lucas Veronese	23	(France) Amiens	Free Transfer	
1 July 2014	DF	(Serbia) Nemanja Pejčinović	26	(Russia) Lokomotiv Moscow	Free Transfer	
22 July 2014	MF	(France) Fabrice Abriel	35	(France) Valenciennes	Free Transfer	
27 July 2014	GK	(Colombia) David Ospina	25	(England) Arsenal	Undisclosed	
29 August 2014	DF	(France) Timothée Kolodziejczak	22	(Spain) Sevilla	€3,500,000	
2 September 2014	DF	(Netherlands) Luigi Bruins	27	Unattached	Released	
5 January 2015	FW	(Argentina) Darío Cvitanich	30	(Mexico) Pachuca	Undisclosed	
3 February 2015	MF	(France) Hatem Ben Arfa	27	Unattached	Released	

Last updated: 19 February 2015.

== Competitions ==
=== Ligue 1 ===
==== League table ====
Pos	Team	Pld	W	D	L	GF	GA	GD	Pts
9	Rennes	38	13	11	14	35	42	−7	50
10	Guingamp	38	15	4	19	41	55	−14	49
11	Nice	38	13	9	16	44	53	−9	48
12	Bastia	38	12	11	15	37	46	−9	47
13	Caen	38	12	10	16	54	55	−1	46

Source: Ligue 1
Rules for classification: 1) points; 2) goal difference; 3) number of goals scored

==== Results summary ====
Overall								Home						Away					
Pld	W	D	L	GF	GA	GD	Pts	W	D	L	GF	GA	GD	W	D	L	GF	GA	GD
38	13	9	16	44	53	−9	48	6	6	6	21	23	−2	7	3	10	23	30	−7

Last updated: 5 June 2015.
Source: Competitive matches

==== Results by round ====
Round	1	2	3	4	5	6	7	8	9	10	11	12	13	14	15	16	17	18	19	20	21	22	23	24	25	26	27	28	29	30	31	32	33	34	35	36	37	38
Ground	H	A	H	A	H	A	H	A	H	H	A	H	A	H	A	H	A	H	A	H	A	H	A	H	A	H	A	A	H	A	H	A	H	A	H	A	H	A
Result	W	D	L	L	W	L	W	W	D	L	W	L	L	D	L	L	W	D	L	W	W	W	D	D	D	L	L	L	L	W	D	W	L	L	D	L	W	W
Position	4	4	9	16	11	17	12	8	11	12	7	10	12	12	12	15	11	12	12	12	10	8	8	8	9	9	13	15	16	12	13	10	11	12	13	15	12	11

Source: Ligue1
A = Away; H = Home; W = Win; D = Draw; L = Loss

==== Matches ====
Win Draw Loss

9 August 2014 1	Nice	3–2	Toulouse	Nice
21:00 CEST (UTC+02:00)	Cvitanich 23', 62'; Bosetti 68'	Report	Braithwaite 44'; Ben Yedder 45'; Regattin (yellow card) 58'	Stadium: Allianz Riviera; Attendance: 20,729; Referee: Frank Schneider

16 August 2014 2	Lorient	0–0	Nice	Lorient
20:00 CEST (UTC+02:00)	Ayew (yellow card) 22'	Report	Honorat (yellow card) 35'; Hassen (yellow card) 90+1'	Stadium: Stade du Moustoir; Attendance: 13,735; Referee: Saïd Ennjimi

23 August 2014 3	Nice	1–3	Bordeaux	Nice
20:00 CEST (UTC+02:00)	Bosetti 11'; Amavi (yellow card) 31'; Diawara (yellow card) 90+1'	Report	Contento (yellow card) 31'; Diabaté 33' (pen.), (yellow card) 37' (yellow-red card) 82'; Rolán (yellow card) 34'; Maurice-Belay 47'; Pallois (yellow card) 54'; Sertić 55'; Mariano (yellow card) 87'	Stadium: Allianz Riviera; Attendance: 22,712; Referee: Stéphane Lannoy

29 August 2013 4	Marseille	4–0	Nice	Marseille
20:30 CEST (UTC+02:00)	Payet 19', 48'; Thauvin 45'; Ayew (yellow card) 78'; Barrada 88'	Report	Amavi (yellow card) 31'; Diawara (yellow card) 45'	Stadium: Stade Vélodrome; Attendance: 39,497; Referee: Bartolomeu Varela

13 September 2014 5	Nice	1–0	Metz	Nice
20:00 CEST (UTC+02:00)	Hult (yellow card) 83'; Bosetti 90+4'	Report	Lejeune (yellow card) 17'; Maïga (yellow card) 70'	Stadium: Allianz Riviera; Attendance: 18,019; Referee: Tony Chapron

20 September 2014 6	Nantes	2–1	Nice	Nantes
20:00 CEST (UTC+02:00)	Amavi 9' (o.g.); Shechter 43'	Report	Bodmer (yellow card) 24'; Amavi 70'	Stadium: Stade de la Beaujoire; Attendance: 23,240; Referee: Clément Turpin

24 September 2014 7	Nice	1–0	Lille	Nice
19:00 CEST (UTC+02:00)	Bodmer 41'; Bauthéac (yellow card) 67'	Report	Kjær (yellow card) 72'	Stadium: Allianz Riviera; Attendance: 16,541; Referee: Benoît Millot

27 September 2014 8	Monaco	0–1	Nice	Monaco
14:00 CEST (UTC+02:00)	Berbatov (yellow card) 19'; Dirar (yellow card) 73'	Report	Carlos Eduardo 7'; Hult (yellow card) 29'; Bauthéac (yellow card) 49'; Bosetti (yellow card) 85'; Eysseric (yellow card) 86'	Stadium: Stade Louis II; Attendance: 8,941; Referee: Ruddy Buquet

4 October 2014 9	Nice	1–1	Montpellier	Nice
20:00 CEST (UTC+02:00)	Bodmer (yellow card) 75'; Palun 90+2'	Report	Tiéné (yellow card) 54'; Hilton (yellow card) 67', (goal) 72'; Montaño (yellow card) 90'	Stadium: Allianz Riviera; Attendance: 19,634; Referee: Wilfried Bien

18 October 2014 10	Nice	0–1	Bastia	Nice
20:00 CEST (UTC+02:00)	Amavi (yellow card) 38'; Bosetti (yellow card) 57'; Digard (yellow card) 71'	Report	Diakité (yellow card) 41'; Ayité 51'; Boudebouz (yellow card) 57'; Rodríguez (yellow card) 90+5'	Stadium: Allianz Riviera; Attendance: 18,919; Referee: Saïd Ennjimi

26 October 2014 11	Guingamp	2–7	Nice	Guingamp
17:00 CEST (UTC+02:00)	Beauvue 8'; Schwartz 70'	Report	Carlos Eduardo 12', 26', 43', 50', 64'; Palun (yellow card) 16'; Pléa 45+1'; Bauthéac 72'	Stadium: Stade du Roudourou; Attendance: 14,664; Referee: Clément Turpin

1 November 2014 12	Nice	1–3	Lyon	Nice
20:00 CET (UTC+01:00)	Mendy (yellow card) 29'; Palun (yellow card) 40'; Bauthéac (yellow card) 44'; Puel 51'	Report	Jallet (yellow card) 55'; Malbranque 64'; Fekir (yellow card) 78'; Lacazette 80', 90+4'	Stadium: Allianz Riviera; Attendance: 15,677; Referee: Amaury Delerue

8 November 2014 13	Evian	1–0	Nice	Annecy
20:00 CET (UTC+01:00)	Angoula (yellow card) 70'; Wass 76'	Report	Amavi (yellow card) 34'; Mendy (yellow card) 75'; Pléa (yellow card) 89'	Stadium: Parc des Sports; Attendance: 7,738; Referee: Nicolas Rainville

22 November 2014 14	Nice	0–0	Reims	Nice
20:00 CET (UTC+01:00)	Vercauteren (yellow card) 80'; Rafetraniaina (yellow card) 86'	Report	Oniangue (yellow card) 23'; Tacalfred (yellow card) 28'	Stadium: Allianz Riviera; Attendance: 15,207; Referee: Philippe Kalt

29 November 2014 15	Paris Saint-Germain	1–0	Nice	Paris
17:00 CET (UTC+01:00)	Ibrahimović 15' (pen.); Motta (yellow card) 78'	Report	Pléa (yellow card) 45+1'; Palun (yellow card) 81'	Stadium: Parc des Princes; Attendance: 45,542; Referee: Sébastien Desiage

3 December 2014 16	Nice	1–2	Rennes	Nice
19:00 CET (UTC+01:00)	Rafetraniaina (yellow card) 27'; Gomis (yellow card) 56'; Cvitanich 83'	Report	Ntep 12'; Konradsen 49'; Brüls (yellow card) 87'	Stadium: Allianz Riviera; Attendance: 15,033; Referee: Alexandre Castro

6 December 2014 17	Caen	2–3	Nice	Caen
20:00 CET (UTC+01:00)	Lemar (yellow card) 36'; Duhamel 39' (pen.); Nangis 45'	Report	Amavi 32'; Bauthéac 64' (pen.); Pléa 74'; Mendy (yellow card) 88'	Stadium: Stade Michel d'Ornano; Attendance: 13,487; Referee: Clément Turpin

14 December 2014 18	Nice	0–0	Saint-Étienne	Nice
14:00 CET (UTC+01:00)	Carlos Eduardo (red card) 38'; Bauthéac (yellow card) 75'	Report	Diomande (yellow card) 29' (yellow-red card) 37'; Hamouma (yellow card) 34'	Stadium: Allianz Riviera; Attendance: 18,493; Referee: Lionel Jaffredo

19 December 2014 19	Lens	2–0	Nice	Amiens
20:30 CET (UTC+01:00)	Sylla (yellow card) 26'; Cyprien 38'; Lemoigne (yellow card) 72'; Valdivia (yellow card) 73'; Coulibaly 86'	Report	Eysseric (yellow card) 18'; Puel (yellow card) 39'	Stadium: Stade de la Licorne; Attendance: 8,705; Referee: Sébastien Desiage

10 January 2015 20	Nice	3–1	Lorient	Nice
20:00 CET (UTC+01:00)	Bodmer (yellow card) 5'; Bauthéac 30' (pen.); Bosetti 60'; Carlos Eduardo 67'	Report	Jeannot 6'; Mesloub (yellow card) 62'	Stadium: Allianz Riviera; Attendance: 16,141; Referee: Wilfried Bien

16 January 2015 21	Bordeaux	1–2	Nice	Bordeaux
20:30 CET (UTC+01:00)	Sertic (yellow card) 26'; Rolán 33' (pen.); Contento (yellow card) 37'	Report	Genevois (yellow card) 27'; Hassen (yellow card) 32'; Puel (yellow card) 37'; Amavi (yellow card) 48', (goal) 66'; Pléa (yellow card) 65', (goal) 90'	Stadium: Stade Chaban-Delmas; Attendance: 13,953; Referee: Benoît Millot

24 January 2015 22	Nice	2–1	Marseille	Nice
20:30 CET (UTC+01:00)	Genevois 47'; Gomis (yellow card) 51' (yellow-red card) 53'; Pléa (yellow card) 53'; Hult 73'; Mendy (yellow card) 87'; Bauthéac (yellow card) 89'	Report	Aloé (yellow card) 36'; Imbula (yellow card) 59'; Dja Djédjé (yellow card) 64'; Thauvin 77'	Stadium: Allianz Riviera; Attendance: 25,407; Referee: Antony Gautier

31 January 2015 23	Metz	0–0	Nice	Metz
20:00 CET (UTC+01:00)	Sarr (yellow card) 12'; N'Daw (yellow card) 28'	Report	Puel (yellow card) 19'; Maupay (red card) 73'	Stadium: Stade Municipal Saint-Symphorien; Attendance: 15,115; Referee: Mikael Lesage

8 February 2015 24	Nice	0–0	Nantes	Nice
17:00 CET (UTC+01:00)	Bauthéac (yellow card) 17'; Palun (yellow card) 21'	Report	Vizcarrondo (yellow card) 45'; Alhadhur (yellow card) 72'	Stadium: Allianz Riviera; Attendance: 18,062; Referee: Tony Chapron

14 February 2015 25	Lille	0–0	Nice	Villeneuve-d'Ascq
20:00 CET (UTC+01:00)	Lopes (yellow card) 35'; Sidibé (red card) 42'; Balmont (yellow card) 44'; Mavuba (yellow card) 45+1'	Report	Genevois (yellow card) 42'; Pléa (yellow card) 69'; Bauthéac (yellow card) 70'	Stadium: Stade Pierre-Mauroy; Attendance: 35,053; Referee: Bartolomeu Varela

20 February 2015 26	Nice	0–1	Monaco	Nice
20:30 CET (UTC+01:00)	Mendy (yellow card) 26'; Gomis (yellow card) 57'; Diawara (yellow card) 77'; Koziello (yellow card) 87'; Eysseric (yellow card) 87'	Report	Abdennour (red card) 45+3'; Silva 85'	Stadium: Allianz Riviera; Attendance: 24,130; Referee: Benoît Bastien

1 March 2015 27	Montpellier	2–1	Nice	Montpellier
17:00 CET (UTC+01:00)	Deplagne (yellow card) 35'; Dabo 45'; Barrios 66'; Jourdren (yellow card) 86'; Marveaux (yellow card) 89'	Report	Carlos Eduardo (yellow card) 15'; Rafetraniaina (yellow card) 18'; Bauthéac 36' (pen.); Hult (yellow card) 39'; Eysseric (yellow card) 88'	Stadium: Stade de la Mosson; Attendance: 12,083; Referee: Ruddy Buquet

7 March 2015 28	Bastia	2–1	Nice	Bastia
20:00 CET (UTC+01:00)	Sio (yellow card) 3', (goal) 68'; Diakité (yellow card) 8'; Gillet 26'; Cahuzac (yellow card) 52'	Report	Diawara (yellow card) 14', (red card) 83'; Carlos Eduardo 17'; Hult (yellow card) 27'; Puel (red card) 44'; Amavi (yellow card) 77'	Stadium: Stade Armand Cesari; Attendance: 13,777; Referee: Fredy Fautrel

13 March 2015 29	Nice	1–2	Guingamp	Nice
20:30 CET (UTC+01:00)	Carlos Eduardo (yellow card) 13'; Bauthéac (yellow card) 43', (goal) 57'	Report	Mandanne 49', 61', (yellow card) 67'; Mathis (yellow card) 55'	Stadium: Allianz Riviera; Referee: Benoît Millot

21 March 2015 30	Lyon	1–2	Nice	Lyon
16:00 CEST (UTC+02:00)	Fekir (yellow card) 30'; Koné (yellow card) 53'; Gonalons 56', (yellow card) 59'; N'Jie (yellow card) 62'	Report	Palun (yellow card) 5' (yellow-red card) 54'; Carlos Eduardo 23'; Pléa (yellow card) 79'; Koziello (yellow card) 83'; Eysseric 86'	Stadium: Stade de Gerland; Attendance: 36,300; Referee: Antony Gautier

4 April 2015 31	Nice	2–2	Evian	Nice
CEST (UTC+02:00)	Pouplin (yellow card) 9'; Gomis (yellow card) 16'; Bosetti 45+1', (yellow card) 75'; Eysseric 68'; Amavi (yellow card) 87'; Bauthéac (yellow card) 90+3'	Report	Nounkeu 18'; Nielsen (yellow card) 30'; Tejeda (yellow card) 56'; Gomis 78' (o.g.); Abdallah (yellow card) 87'; Sougou (yellow card) 90+3'	Stadium: Allianz Riviera; Attendance: 18,581; Referee: Stéphane Lannoy

12 April 2015 32	Reims	0–1	Nice	Reims
17:00 CEST (UTC+02:00)	Mandi (yellow card) 31'; Diego (yellow card) 75'; Kyei (yellow card) 77'	Report	Benrahma 4'; Bauthéac (yellow card) 29'; Genevois (yellow card) 36'; Amavi (yellow card) 51'	Stadium: Stade Auguste Delaune; Attendance: 14,905; Referee: Mikael Lesage

18 April 2015 33	Nice	1–3	Paris Saint-Germain	Nice
21:00 CEST (UTC+02:00)	Bodmer 45+1'; Amavi (yellow card) 75'	Report	Pastore (yellow card) 32', (goal) 39', 63'; Cavani 69' (pen.); Sirigu (yellow card) 76'	Stadium: Allianz Riviera; Attendance: 25,145; Referee: Sébastien Desiage

25 April 2015 34	Rennes	2–1	Nice	Rennes
20:00 CEST (UTC+02:00)	André (yellow card) 32'; Prcić 47'; Konradsen 90'	Report	Bauthéac 22'; Eysseric (yellow card) 90+2'; Pléa (yellow card) 90+3'	Stadium: Stade de la Route de Lorient; Attendance: 20,675; Referee: Tony Chapron

2 May 2015 35	Nice	1–1	Caen	Nice
20:00 CEST (UTC+02:00)	Carlos Eduardo 41'; Amavi (yellow card) 82'; Honorat (yellow card) 88'	Report	Benezet 15'; Appiah (yellow card) 90+2'	Stadium: Allianz Riviera; Attendance: 19,009; Referee: Philippe Kalt

10 May 2015 36	Saint-Étienne	5–0	Nice	Saint-Étienne
17:00 CEST (UTC+02:00)	Clément (yellow card) 9', (goal) 40'; Bayal Sall (yellow card) 11'; Perrin 25'; Erdinç 62'; Gradel 84'; Monnet-Paquet 88'	Report	Bauthéac (yellow card) 12'; Amavi (yellow card) 39'	Stadium: Stade Geoffroy-Guichard; Attendance: 32,770; Referee: Bartolomeu Varela

16 May 2015 37	Nice	2–1	Lens	Nice
21:00 CEST (UTC+02:00)	Amavi 29'; Bodmer (yellow card) 45'; Digard 77'	Report	Touzghar 14'; Cyprien (yellow card) 16'	Stadium: Allianz Riviera; Attendance: 20,185; Referee: Nicolas Rainville

23 May 2015 38	Toulouse	2–3	Nice	Toulouse
21:00 CEST (UTC+02:00)	Akpa Akpro (yellow card) 35'; Ben Yedder 79'; Trejo 81'; Bodiger (yellow card) 84'	Report	Maupay 8', (yellow card) 23'; Koziello (yellow card) 16'; Bauthéac 34', 53'; Palun (yellow card) 76'; Bodmer (yellow card) 83'	Stadium: Stadium Municipal; Attendance: 19,830; Referee: Lionel Jaffredo

=== Coupe de la Ligue ===
29 October 2014 Round of 32	Nice	3–3 (a.e.t.) (2–3 p)	Metz	Nice
18:30 CEST (UTC+02:00)	Maupay 20'; Palun (yellow card) 32'; Bosetti 37'; Cvitanich 88' (pen.)	Report	Palomino 5'; Ngbakoto 13'; Vion 17'; Kashi (yellow card) 42'; Marchal (yellow card) 45+1'; Doukouré (yellow card) 82'; Rocchi (yellow card) 113'	Stadium: Allianz Riviera; Attendance: 9,560; Referee: Ruddy Buquet
	Penalties
	Bodmer (penalty missed); Cvitanich (penalty missed); Pléa (penalty scored); Eysseric (penalty scored); Bosetti (penalty missed)		(penalty missed) Malouda; (penalty scored) Doukouré; (penalty scored) Marchal; (penalty scored) Palomino

=== Coupe de France ===
3 January 2015 Round of 64	Valenciennes	2–0	Nice	Valenciennes
18:00 CET (UTC+01:00)	Coulibaly 11'; Poepon 14'	Report	Bodmer (yellow card) 38'	Stadium: Stade du Hainaut; Attendance: 5,252; Referee: Benoît Bastien
