= Jordan Amavi =

French footballer (born 1994)

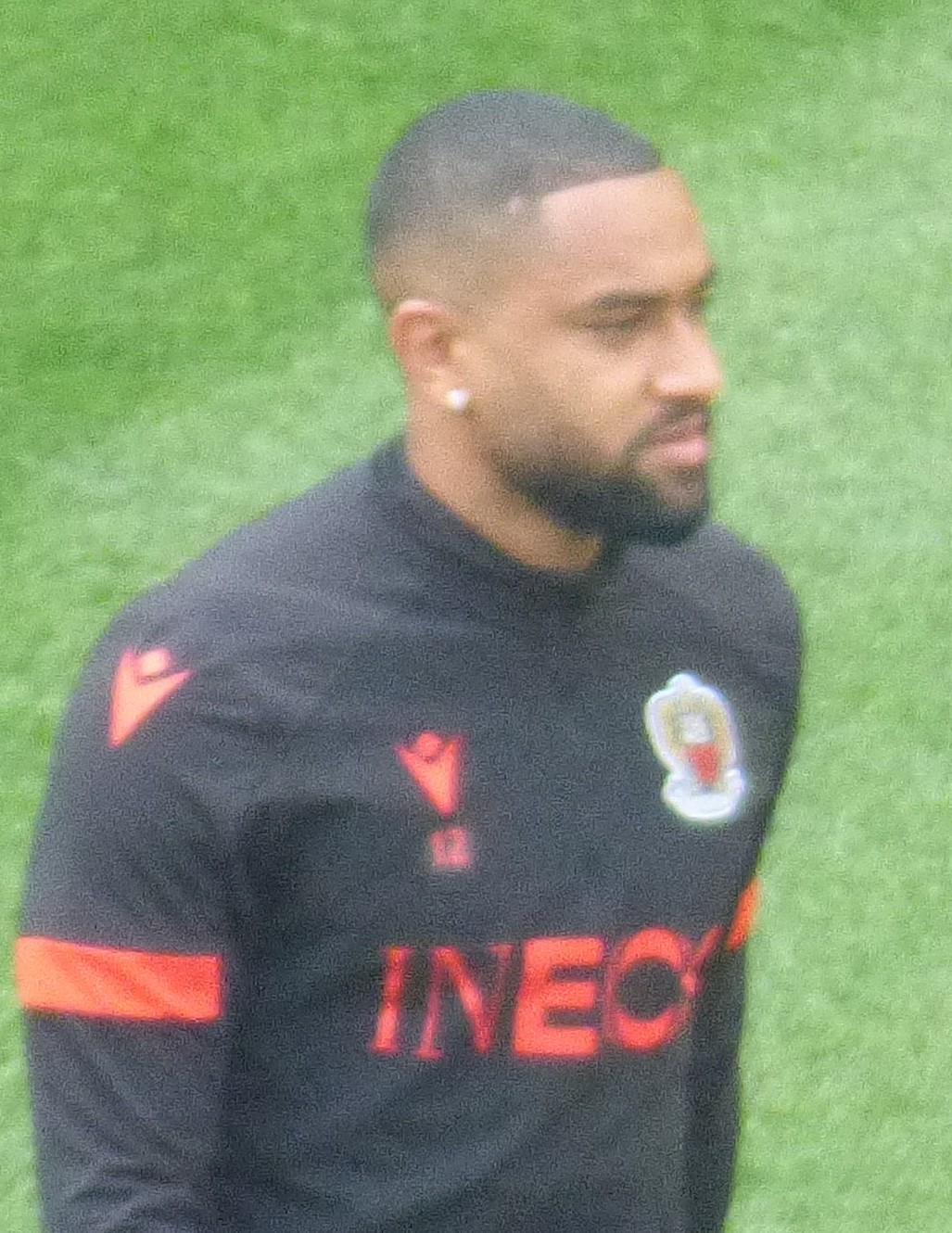
- Amavi with Nice in 2022

Personal information
- Full name: Jordan Kévin Amavi
- Date of birth: 9 March 1994 (age 32)
- Place of birth: Toulon, France
- Height: 1.76 m (5 ft 9 in)
- Position: Left-back

Youth career
- 2001–2010: Toulon
- 2010–2013: Nice

Senior career*
Years	Team	Apps	(Gls)
2011–2013	Nice B	20	(3)
2013–2015	Nice	55	(4)
2015–2017	Aston Villa	44	(0)
2017–2024	Marseille	96	(2)
2022	→ Nice (loan)	8	(0)
2022–2023	→ Getafe (loan)	5	(0)
2023–2024	→ Brest (loan)	2	(1)
2024–2025	Brest	11	(0)

International career^{‡}
2012	France U18	2	(0)
2013–2014	France U20	6	(0)
2014–2016	France U21	10	(1)
- * Club domestic league appearances and goals as of 25 May 2025 ‡ National team caps and goals as of 11 October 2016 (UTC)

Jordan Kévin Amavi (born 9 March 1994) is a French professional footballer who plays as a left-back.

== Club career ==
=== Nice ===
Born in Toulon, Amavi made his Ligue 1 debut with Nice in the opening game of the 2013–14 season on 10 August 2013 against Lyon.

=== Aston Villa ===
On 18 July 2015, he signed for Premier League side Aston Villa on a five-year contract for an undisclosed fee, reported to be in the region of £9 million. He made his debut on 8 August, playing the full 90 minutes of a 1–0 win over Bournemouth at Dean Court. On 15 November, Amavi suffered an ACL tear in his right knee while on duty with the France U21 team, ending his first season at Aston Villa.

Without Amavi, Villa were relegated to the EFL Championship, the second tier of English football, which lead to speculation on the future of Amavi as well as other Villa players. However, Amavi decided to continue playing for Villa for the 2016–17 season, as he had high hopes on Villa being promoted immediately back up to the Premier League. On 27 December 2016, Aston Villa turned down an £25 million bid from an undisclosed club from China for Amavi; reports in France also claimed that Marseille had also bid for the player. That season, he made 34 appearances in the Championship for Villa, but they finished in a bottom-half thirteenth-place league finish.

=== Marseille ===
On 10 August 2017, it was agreed that Amavi would join Ligue 1 side Olympique de Marseille on loan for the entirety of the 2017–18 season, with Marseille also considering interest in signing the player in a permanent transfer in the following season.

Marseille decided to make Amavi's move permanent in October 2017, meeting an agreed clause in the loan contract.

On 3 May 2018, he played in the Europa League semi-finals away to FC Red Bull Salzburg as Marseilles played out a 1–2 away loss but a 3–2 aggregate win to secure a place in the 2018 UEFA Europa League Final to be played at the Parc Olympique Lyonnais in Décines-Charpieu, Lyon, France on 16 May 2018. A double from Antoine Griezmann helped Atlético Madrid defeat Amavi's Marseille side 3–0 and win the trophy.

==== Return to Nice (loan) ====
On 5 January 2022, Amavi returned to former club Nice on loan until the end of the 2021–22 season with an option to buy.

==== Loan to Getafe ====
On 1 September 2022, Amavi was loaned to La Liga side Getafe for the season.

=== Brest ===
On 31 August 2023, Amavi was loaned to fellow Ligue 1 side Brest for the 2023–24 season. On 19 May 2024, he scored his first goal from a free-kick in a 3–0 away win over Toulouse on the final matchday of the season, helping his club to secure a third-place finish in the league and first ever qualification to the UEFA Champions League. On 31 July 2024, he was transferred to Brest on a permanent deal, signing a one-year contract with an option for an extra year.

== International career ==
Amavi is of Togolese descent and was part of the France under-20 team which finished as runners-up to Brazil at the 2014 Toulon Tournament.

He was called up to the senior France squad for a World Cup qualifier against Belarus in October 2017.

== Career statistics ==
As of 31 July 2024

Appearances and goals by club, season and competition
Club	Season	League			National cup (Note: Includes Coupe de France, FA Cup, Copa del Rey)		League cup (Note: Includes Coupe de la Ligue, EFL Cup)		Europe		Total	
Club	Season	Division	Apps	Goals	Apps	Goals	Apps	Goals	Apps	Goals	Apps	Goals
Nice B	2012–13	CFA 2	18	3	—		—		—		18	3
Nice B	2013–14	CFA	2	0	—		—		—		2	0
Nice B	Total		20	3	—		—		—		20	3
Nice	2013–14	Ligue 1	19	0	2	0	1	0	1 (Note: Appearance(s) in UEFA Europa League)	0	23	0
Nice	2014–15	Ligue 1	36	4	1	0	0	0	—		37	4
Nice	Total		63	4	4	0	1	0	1	0	69	4
Aston Villa	2015–16	Premier League	10	0	0	0	2	0	—		12	0
Aston Villa	2016–17	Championship	34	0	1	0	1	0	—		36	0
Aston Villa	Total		44	0	1	0	3	0	—		48	0
Marseille (loan)	2017–18	Ligue 1	27	0	3	1	1	0	12	0	43	1
Marseille	2018–19	Ligue 1	28	0	1	0	1	0	3	0	33	0
Marseille	2019–20	Ligue 1	26	1	2	0	1	0	—		29	1
Marseille	2020–21	Ligue 1	13	1	0	0	—		5 (Note: Appearances in UEFA Champions League)	0	18	1
Marseille	2021–22	Ligue 1	2	0	2	0	—		0	0	4	0
Marseille	Total		96	2	8	1	3	0	20	0	127	3
Nice (loan)	2021–22	Ligue 1	8	0	1	0	—		—		9	0
Getafe (loan)	2022–23	La Liga	5	0	1	0	—		—		6	0
Brest (loan)	2023–24	Ligue 1	2	1	0	0	—		—		2	1
Brest	2024–25	Ligue 1	0	0	0	0	—		—		0	0
Career total			230	10	14	1	7	0	21	0	282	11

== Honours ==
Marseille

- UEFA Europa League runner-up: 2017–18

Nice

- Coupe de France runner-up: 2021–22
