= 2015–16 Aston Villa F.C. season =

English football club season

Aston Villa
2015–16 season
- Chairman: Randy Lerner
- Manager: Tim Sherwood; (until 25 October); Kevin MacDonald; (interim, from 25 October to 2 November); Rémi Garde; (from 2 November to 29 March); Eric Black; (interim, from 30 March)
- Stadium: Villa Park
- Premier League: 20th (relegated)
- FA Cup: Fourth round
- League Cup: Fourth round
- Top goalscorer: League: Jordan Ayew (7); All: Jordan Ayew (7)
Home colours	Away colours	Third colours

Second City Derby
- 55--37--30

The 2015-16 season was Aston Villa's 24th season in the Premier League and their 28th consecutive season in the top flight of English football. The 2015–16 Premier League season was Villa's 141st season in English football. Villa also participated in the FA Cup and League Cup.

The club was initially managed by Tim Sherwood, in what would have been his first full season as manager. However, Sherwood was sacked on 25 October 2015. A week later, Rémi Garde agreed a three-and-a-half-year deal to become manager of the bottom of table Premier League side. Six days later, in Garde's first match in charge, his new team drew 0–0 with league leaders Manchester City.

Garde put a strong emphasis on discipline at Villa. He dropped midfielder Jack Grealish from the first team after he went partying following a 4–0 loss at Everton. On 29 March 2016, with Villa still bottom of the league, Garde left the club by mutual consent with Ex-Coventry City manager Eric Black taking interim charge for the last seven games of the season.

The club were relegated from the top flight of English football for the first time since the 1986–87 season following an away loss to Manchester United on 16 April 2016, having been one of seven remaining sides (along with Arsenal, Chelsea, Everton, Liverpool, Manchester United and Tottenham Hotspur) who had not been relegated since the Premier League's inception in 1992 at the beginning of the 2015–16 season. On 18 May 2016, it was announced that Tony Xia's Recon Group had agreed to buy Aston Villa for a reported £60 million from American businessman Randy Lerner, with the club becoming part of Recon Group's Sports, Leisure and Tourism division. On 14 June 2016, the sale was completed for a reported £76 million after being approved by the Football League. Upon completion of the sale, Xia became chairman of the club.

== Premier League ==
Pos	Team	Pld	W	D	L	GF	GA	GD	Pts	Qualification or relegation
16	Bournemouth	38	11	9	18	45	67	−22	42	
17	Sunderland	38	9	12	17	48	62	−14	39	
18	Newcastle United (R)	38	9	10	19	44	65	−21	37	Relegation to EFL Championship
19	Norwich City (R)	38	9	7	22	39	67	−28	34	Relegation to EFL Championship
20	Aston Villa (R)	38	3	8	27	27	76	−49	17	Relegation to EFL Championship

Source: Barclays Premier League
Rules for classification: 1) Points; 2) Goal difference; 3) Goals scored; 4) Play-offs (only if needed to decide champion, teams for relegation or teams for UEFA competitions).
(R) Relegated

Matches
On 17 June 2015, the fixtures for the forthcoming season were announced.

8 August 2015 1	Bournemouth	0–1	Aston Villa	Bournemouth
15:00 BST	King (yellow card) 24'; Cook (yellow card) 41'; Gosling (yellow card) 80'	Report	Clark (yellow card) 45+1'; Gestede 72'; Bacuna (yellow card) 74'; Gueye (yellow card) 75'; Westwood (yellow card) 90+2'	Stadium: Dean Court; Attendance: 11,155; Referee: Mark Clattenburg
Note: Villa win their first game of the season 1–0 away at newly promoted Bournemouth. Substitute Rudy Gestede scores the winner on his debut for the club. Five other players also made their debuts: Jordan Ayew, Idrissa Gueye, Jordan Amavi, Jordan Veretout, and Micah Richards.

14 August 2015 2	Aston Villa	0–1	Manchester United	Birmingham
19:45 BST	Ayew (yellow card) 71'; Gueye (yellow card) 90+1'	Report	Januzaj 29'; Herrera (yellow card) 74'; Darmian (yellow card) 84'	Stadium: Villa Park; Attendance: 42,200; Referee: Mike Dean
Note: Aston Villa’s first Friday-night top-flight fixture since 2004.

22 August 2015 3	Crystal Palace	2–1	Aston Villa	Selhurst
15:00 BST	Ward (yellow card) 18'; Cabaye (yellow card) 50'; Dann 71'; Sako 87'; Puncheon (yellow card) 90'	Report	Gestede (yellow card) 55'; Souaré 77' (o.g.); Clark (yellow card) 84'; Bacuna (yellow card) 86'	Stadium: Selhurst Park; Attendance: 25,295; Referee: Keith Stroud
Note: Adama Traoré made his debut, coming on for Carlos Sánchez in the 69' minute.

29 August 2015 4	Aston Villa	2–2	Sunderland	Birmingham
15:00 BST	Sinclair 11' (pen.), 41'; Clark (yellow card) 37'; Gil (yellow card) 79'	Report	M'Vila 8'; Lens 52'; Pantilimon (yellow card) 90'	Stadium: Villa Park; Attendance: 35,399; Referee: Bobby Madley

13 September 2015 5	Leicester City	3–2	Aston Villa	Leicester
16:00 BST	Albrighton (yellow card) 45+1'; De Laet 72'; Vardy 82'; Dyer (yellow card) 77', (goal) 89'	Report	Grealish 39'; Gil 63'; Amavi (yellow card) 81'	Stadium: King Power Stadium; Attendance: 31,733; Referee: Mike Dean
Note: Villa blow a 2–0 lead with 18 minutes to go, as they lose 3–2 away at Leicester City. One positive is academy product Jack Grealish scoring his first senior goal for the club.

19 September 2015 6	Aston Villa	0–1	West Bromwich Albion	Birmingham
15:00 BST	Gil (yellow card) 62'; Amavi (yellow card) 82'	Report	Brunt (yellow card) 21'; Morrison (yellow card) 34'; Berahino 39'; Yacob (yellow card) 78'	Stadium: Villa Park; Attendance: 36,321; Referee: Martin Atkinson

26 September 2015 7	Liverpool	3–2	Aston Villa	Liverpool
15:00 BST	Milner 2'; Sturridge 59', 67'	Report	Gestede 66', 71'	Stadium: Anfield; Attendance: 44,228; Referee: Jon Moss

3 October 2015 8	Aston Villa	0–1	Stoke City	Birmingham
15:00 BST	Westwood (yellow card) 44'	Report	Arnautović 55'	Stadium: Villa Park; Attendance: 33,189; Referee: Mike Jones

17 October 2015 9	Chelsea	2–0	Aston Villa	Fulham
15:00 BST	Costa 34'; Hutton 54' (o.g.); Willian (yellow card) 74'	Report	Ayew (yellow card) 49'; Richardson (yellow card) 62'; Grealish (yellow card) 85'	Stadium: Stamford Bridge; Attendance: 41,596; Referee: Roger East

24 October 2015 10	Aston Villa	1–2	Swansea City	Birmingham
15:00 BST	Richards (yellow card) 31'; J. Ayew 62'; Richardson (yellow card) 77'	Report	Naughton (yellow card) 29'; Williams (yellow card) 31'; Sigurðsson 68', (yellow card) 73'; A. Ayew 87'	Stadium: Villa Park; Attendance: 33,324; Referee: Neil Swarbrick
Note: Villa sack Tim Sherwood as manager after a 2–1 loss against Swansea City at Villa Park. This was the club's eighth defeat in the first ten league games and sixth in a row.

2 November 2015 11	Tottenham Hotspur	3–1	Aston Villa	Tottenham
20:00 GMT	Dembélé 3'; Alli 45+1'; Kane 90+3'	Report	Ayew (yellow card) 42', (goal) 79'; Richardson (yellow card) 67'; Hutton (yellow card) 90+2'	Stadium: White Hart Lane; Attendance: 34,882; Referee: Mike Dean
Note: 2 November: Villa appoint Frenchman Rémi Garde as their new manager on a three-and-a-half-year deal.

8 November 2015 12	Aston Villa	0–0	Manchester City	Birmingham
13:30 GMT	Guzan (yellow card) 90+2'	Report	Otamendi (yellow card) 39'	Stadium: Villa Park; Attendance: 36,757; Referee: Craig Pawson
Note: Villa draw 0–0 with league leaders Manchester City, earning Rémi Garde a point in his first match in charge as manager and simultaneously ending a seven-match losing streak.

21 November 2015 13	Everton	4–0	Aston Villa	Liverpool
15:00 GMT	Barkley 17', 43'; Lukaku 29', 59'	Report		Stadium: Goodison Park; Attendance: 38,424; Referee: Michael Oliver

28 November 2015 14	Aston Villa	2–3	Watford	Birmingham
15:00 GMT	Richards 41'; Clark (yellow card) 85'; Ayew 89'; Sánchez (yellow card) 90+9'	Report	Ighalo 17'; Watson (yellow card) 40'; Hutton 69' (o.g.); Capoue (yellow card) 74'; Deeney 85', (yellow card) 86'; Aké (yellow card) 90+8'	Stadium: Villa Park; Attendance: 35,057; Referee: Lee Mason
Note: After a 3–2 defeat against Watford at Villa Park, Villa break their record for most league games without winning with the total reaching 13.

5 December 2015 15	Southampton	1–1	Aston Villa	Southampton
15:00 GMT	Ward-Prowse (yellow card) 30'; Romeu 73'	Report	Lescott 44'; Hutton (yellow card) 89'; Guzan (yellow card) 90'	Stadium: St. Mary's Stadium; Attendance: 29,645; Referee: Anthony Taylor

13 December 2015 16	Aston Villa	0–2	Arsenal	Birmingham
13:30 GMT		Report	Giroud 8' (pen.); Ramsey 38'	Stadium: Villa Park; Attendance: 33,285; Referee: Kevin Friend

19 December 2015 17	Newcastle United	1–1	Aston Villa	Newcastle upon Tyne
17:30	Coloccini 38'; Dummett (yellow card) 41'	Report	Ayew 61', (yellow card) 79'; Bacuna (yellow card) 77'; Westwood (yellow card) 84'	Stadium: St James' Park; Attendance: 48,234; Referee: Martin Atkinson

26 December 2015 18	Aston Villa	1–1	West Ham United	Birmingham
15:00 GMT	Bacuna (yellow card) 12'; Ayew 62' (pen.); Hutton (yellow card) 78'; Lescott (yellow card) 90'	Report	Ogbonna (yellow card) 13'; Cresswell 45'; Collins (yellow card) 58'; Kouyaté (yellow card) 74'	Stadium: Villa Park; Attendance: 38,193; Referee: Mike Dean

28 December 2015 19	Norwich City	2–0	Aston Villa	Norwich
15:00 GMT	Howson 24'; Bennett (yellow card) 61'; Mbokani 87'; Martin (yellow card) 90+3'	Report	Veretout (yellow card) 42'; Gueye (yellow card) 77'; Ayew (yellow card) 90'; Westwood (yellow card) 90+2'; Richards (yellow card) 90+3'	Stadium: Carrow Road; Attendance: 27,071; Referee: Graham Scott
Note: Villa lose their final game of 2015 going down 2–0 away to Norwich City. This defeat sees the club 11 points from safety at the halfway point of the season, as well as their winless run in the league stretching to 18 games.

2 January 2016 20	Sunderland	3–1	Aston Villa	Sunderland
15:00 GMT	Brown (yellow card) 26'; Van Aanholt 30'; Borini (yellow card) 33'; Defoe 72', 90+2'; Cattermole (yellow card) 90+5'	Report	Hutton (yellow card) 43'; Gil 63', (yellow card) 87'; Traoré (yellow card) 69'; Gestede (yellow card) 90+5'	Stadium: Stadium of Light; Attendance: 41,535; Referee: Craig Pawson
Note: Villa start 2016 with another defeat, this time losing 3–1 at their nearest rivals in the table Sunderland.

12 January 2016 21	Aston Villa	1–0	Crystal Palace	Birmingham
19:45 GMT	Hennessey 58' (o.g.); Veretout (yellow card) 68'; Gueye (yellow card) 80'	Report	Ward (yellow card) 79'	Stadium: Villa Park; Attendance: 28,245; Referee: Mark Clattenburg
Note: Villa finally record their first league win since the opening day, overcoming Crystal Palace 1–0 at Villa Park courtesy of a Joleon Lescott goal following a goalkeeping error. The game saw the team end a club-record 19 game winless run, as well as recording their first home league win since May 2015.

16 January 2016 22	Aston Villa	1–1	Leicester City	Birmingham
17:30 GMT	Bunn (yellow card) 14'; Cissokho (yellow card) 32'; Gestede 75'; Bacuna (yellow card) 85'	Report	Okazaki 28'; Huth (yellow card) 76'; Vardy (yellow card) 85'	Stadium: Villa Park; Attendance: 32,763; Referee: Roger East

23 January 2016 23	West Bromwich Albion	0–0	Aston Villa	West Bromwich
15:00 GMT		Report	Richards (yellow card) 41'	Stadium: The Hawthorns; Attendance: 26,165; Referee: Bobby Madley

2 February 2016 24	West Ham United	2–0	Aston Villa	Upton Park
19:45 GMT	Song (yellow card) 48'; Antonio 58'; Collins (yellow card) 67'; Noble (yellow card) 69'; Kouyaté 85'	Report	Ayew (red card) 17'	Stadium: Boleyn Ground; Attendance: 34,914; Referee: Jon Moss

6 February 2016 25	Aston Villa	2–0	Norwich City	Birmingham
15:00 GMT	Klose 45' (o.g.); Agbonlahor 51'	Report	Howson (yellow card) 12'; Klose (yellow card) 77'	Stadium: Villa Park; Attendance: 32,742; Referee: Martin Atkinson

14 February 2016 26	Aston Villa	0–6	Liverpool	Birmingham
14:05 GMT	Bacuna (yellow card) 42'; Westwood (yellow card) 65'; Veretout (yellow card) 77'	Report	Sturridge 16'; Milner 25'; Can 58'; Origi 63'; Clyne 65'; Touré 71'; Stewart (yellow card) 84'	Stadium: Villa Park; Attendance: 35,798; Referee: Neil Swarbrick

27 February 2016 27	Stoke City	2–1	Aston Villa	Stoke-on-Trent
15:00 GMT	Arnautović 51' (pen.), 56'	Report	Gueye (yellow card) 36'; Hutton (yellow card) 45'; Bacuna 79'; Okore (yellow card) 90+4'	Stadium: Britannia Stadium; Attendance: 27,703; Referee: Kevin Friend

1 March 2016 28	Aston Villa	1–3	Everton	Birmingham
19:45 GMT	Clark (yellow card) 13'; Gueye (yellow card) 20'; Bacuna (yellow card) 27'; Gestede 79'	Report	Funes Mori 5'; Lennon 20'; Lukaku (yellow card) 44', (goal) 60'	Stadium: Villa Park; Attendance: 29,755; Referee: Roger East

5 March 2016 29	Manchester City	4–0	Aston Villa	Manchester
15:00 GMT	Touré 48'; Agüero 50', 60'; Sterling 66'	Report	Veretout (yellow card) 45'	Stadium: City of Manchester Stadium; Attendance: 53,892; Referee: Lee Mason

13 March 2016 30	Aston Villa	0–2	Tottenham Hotspur	Birmingham
16:00 GMT		Report	Kane 45', 48'	Stadium: Villa Park; Attendance: 32,323; Referee: Anthony Taylor

19 March 2016 31	Swansea City	1–0	Aston Villa	Swansea
18:30 GMT	Fernández 53'; Sigurðsson (yellow card) 59'; Routledge (yellow card) 87'; Britton (yellow card) 90'	Report	Cissokho (yellow card) 27'; Lescott (yellow card) 90'	Stadium: Liberty Stadium; Attendance: 20,454; Referee: Mike Dean

2 April 2016 32	Aston Villa	0–4	Chelsea	Birmingham
12:45 GMT	Gueye (yellow card) 28'; Cissokho (yellow card) 45'; Sánchez (yellow card) 61'; Hutton (yellow card) 78' (yellow-red card) 85'; Westwood (yellow card) 87'	Report	Loftus-Cheek 26'; Fàbregas (yellow card) 29'; Pato 45'; Pedro 46', 59'	Stadium: Villa Park; Attendance: 31,120; Referee: Neil Swarbrick

9 April 2016 33	Aston Villa	1–2	Bournemouth	Birmingham
15:00 BST	Gueye (yellow card) 36'; Ayew 85', (yellow card) 90'	Report	Cook (yellow card) 27', (goal) 45+2'; Daniels (yellow card) 32'; King 74'	Stadium: Villa Park; Attendance: 31,057; Referee: Martin Atkinson

16 April 2016 34	Manchester United	1–0	Aston Villa	Manchester
15:00 BST	Rashford 32'	Report	Richardson (yellow card) 65'	Stadium: Old Trafford; Attendance: 75,411; Referee: Kevin Friend
Note: Villa lose 1–0 to Manchester United, confirming relegation to the Championship.

23 April 2016 35	Aston Villa	2–4	Southampton	Birmingham
15:00 BST	Westwood 45+1', 85'; Hutton (yellow card) 58'; Gueye (yellow card) 85'	Report	Long 15'; Tadić 39', 71'; Mané 90+4'	Stadium: Villa Park; Attendance: 29,729; Referee: Neil Swarbrick

30 April 2016 36	Watford	3–2	Aston Villa	Watford
15:00 BST	Abdi 45+2', (yellow card) 82'; Berghuis (yellow card) 78'; Deeney 90', 90+3'	Report	Clark 28'; Bacuna (yellow card) 41'; Gueye (yellow card) 45'; Ayew 48'; Cissokho (red card) 73'; Bunn (yellow card) 77'	Stadium: Vicarage Road; Attendance: 20,653; Referee: Anthony Taylor

7 May 2016 37	Aston Villa	0–0	Newcastle United	Birmingham
15:00	Clark (yellow card) 59'	Report		Stadium: Villa Park; Attendance: 33,055; Referee: Bobby Madley

15 May 2016 38	Arsenal	4–0	Aston Villa	London
15:00	Giroud 5', 78', 80'; Bunn 90+2' (o.g.)	Report	Sánchez (yellow card) 39'	Stadium: Emirates Stadium; Attendance: 60,007; Referee: Mark Clattenburg
Note: Randy Lerner's last match as owner

== FA Cup ==
9 January 2016 Third round	Wycombe Wanderers	1–1	Aston Villa	High Wycombe
15:00 BST	Jacobson 50' (pen.); Amadi-Holloway (yellow card) 52'; Harriman (yellow card) 90+1'	Report	Richards 22'; Westwood (yellow card) 49'	Stadium: Adams Park; Attendance: 9,298; Referee: Michael Oliver
Note: 7 December: Villa draw Wycombe Wanderers away in the third round of the FA Cup. 9 January: Another disappointing result for the club as they draw 1–1 in the third round of the FA Cup to League Two side Wycombe Wanderers, sparking angry scenes from Villa fans during and after the match.

19 January 2016 Replay	Aston Villa	2–0	Wycombe Wanderers	Birmingham
19:45 BST	Clark 75'; Gueye 90'	Report	Jacobson (yellow card) 81'	Stadium: Villa Park; Attendance: 20,706; Referee: Craig Pawson
Note: Villa defeat Wycombe Wanderers 2–0 in their FA Cup third round replay, to set up a home tie against Manchester City in the next round.

30 January 2016 Fourth round	Aston Villa	0–4	Manchester City	Birmingham
15:00 BST	Bacuna (yellow card) 27'; Westwood (yellow card) 45+2'	Report	Iheanacho 4', 24' (pen.), 74'; Sterling (yellow card) 27', (goal) 76'; Zabaleta (yellow card) 69'	Stadium: Villa Park; Attendance: 23,636; Referee: Mike Jones
Note: Villa exit the FA Cup after a 0–4 loss to Manchester City at Villa Park.

== League Cup ==
25 August 2015 Second round	Aston Villa	5–3 (a.e.t.)	Notts County	Birmingham
19:45 BST	Traoré 24'; Bunn (yellow card) 45+2'; Sinclair 50', 78' (pen.), 99'; Bennett 111'	Report	Burke (yellow card) 10', (goal) 56'; Snijders 16'; Stead 45+2' (pen.); Amevor (yellow card) 53'; Aborah (yellow card) 109'	Stadium: Villa Park; Attendance: 21,430; Referee: Chris Kavanagh
Note: 13 August: Villa are drawn against Notts County in the second round of the League Cup. Villa make it through to the third round of the League Cup, after a 5–3 extra-time victory over Notts County. They draw arch-rivals Birmingham City in the next round.

22 September 2015 Third round	Aston Villa	1–0	Birmingham City	Birmingham
19:45 BST	Agbonlahor (yellow card) 22'; Clark (yellow card) 41'; Gestede 62'; Westwood (yellow card) 80'	Report	Morrison (yellow card) 78'	Stadium: Villa Park; Attendance: 34,442; Referee: Bobby Madley
Note: Villa beat fierce rivals Birmingham City 1–0 in the first Second City Derby for almost five years. A Rudy Gestede header is enough to send them through to the fourth round of the League Cup.

27 October 2015 Fourth round	Southampton	2–1	Aston Villa	Southampton
19:45 GMT	Yoshida 51'; Pellè 77'	Report	Sinclair 90+4' (pen.)	Stadium: St Mary's Stadium; Attendance: 31,314; Referee: Keith Stroud
Note: Villa are knocked out of the League Cup by Southampton after a 2–1 defeat.

== Summary ==
Overall								Home						Away					
Pld	W	D	L	GF	GA	GD	Pts	W	D	L	GF	GA	GD	W	D	L	GF	GA	GD
38	3	8	27	27	76	−49	17	2	5	12	14	35	−21	1	3	15	13	41	−28

Source: Soccerway

Results by matchday

Round	1	2	3	4	5	6	7	8	9	10	11	12	13	14	15	16	17	18	19	20	21	22	23	24	25	26	27	28	29	30	31	32	33	34	35	36	37	38
Ground	A	H	A	H	A	H	A	H	A	H	A	H	A	H	A	H	A	H	A	A	H	H	A	A	H	H	A	H	A	H	A	H	H	A	H	A	H	A
Result	W	L	L	D	L	L	L	L	L	L	L	D	L	L	D	L	D	D	L	L	W	D	D	L	W	L	L	L	L	L	L	L	L	L	L	L	D	L
Position	5	7	12	12	15	17	18	18	18	19	20	20	20	20	20	20	20	20	20	20	20	20	20	20	20	20	20	20	20	20	20	20	20	20	20	20	20	20
Points	3	3	3	4	4	4	4	4	4	4	4	5	5	5	6	6	7	8	8	8	11	12	13	13	16	16	16	16	16	16	16	16	16	16	16	16	17	17

Updated to match(es) played on May 2016. Source: Soccerway
A = Away; H = Home; W = Win; D = Draw; L = Loss

Competition	Record							
Competition	Pld	W	D	L	GF	GA	GD	Win %
Premier League	38	3	8	27	27	76	−49	7.89
FA Cup	3	1	1	1	3	5	−2	33.33
League Cup	3	2	0	1	7	5	+2	66.67
Total	44	6	9	29	37	86	−49	13.64

Source: Competitions

Games played	44 (38 Premier League, 3 FA Cup, 3 League Cup)
Games won	6 (3 Premier League, 1 FA Cup, 2 League Cup)
Games drawn	9 (8 Premier League, 1 FA Cup)
Games lost	29 (27 Premier League, 1 FA Cup, 1 League Cup)
Goals scored	37 (27 Premier League, 3 FA Cup, 7 League Cup)
Goals conceded	86 (76 Premier League, 5 FA Cup, 5 League Cup)
Total goal difference	-49 (−49 Premier League, −2 FA Cup, +2 League Cup)
Clean sheets	8 (6 Premier League, 1 FA Cup, 1 League Cup)
Yellow Cards	80 (71 Premier League, 5 FA Cup, 4 League Cup)
Red Cards	2 (2 Premier League)
Most appearances	(Benin) Gestede (34)
Most minutes played	(United States) Guzan (2020)
Top scorer	(Ghana) Ayew (Benin) Gestede (England) Sinclair (6)
Worst Discipline	(Ghana) Ayew (6 (yellow card) 1 (red card) )
Points	17
Best Result	2–0 v Wycombe Wanderers, FA Cup (19/1/16) / Norwich City, Premier League (6/2/16)
Worst Result	0–6 v Liverpool, Premier League (13/02/16)

Competition	Started round	Final position / round	First match	Last match
Premier League	Matchday 1	20th (relegated)	8 August 2015	15 May 2016
FA Cup	Third round	Fourth round	9 January 2016	30 January 2016
League Cup	Second round	Fourth round	25 August 2015	28 October 2015

Source: Competitions

== Pre-season friendlies ==
11 July 2015 Training match	Fulham	3–1	Aston Villa	Albufeira, Portugal
18:30 BST	Smith 22'; Kačaniklić 67'; McCormack 86'	Report	Kozák 56'	Stadium: Estadio Da Nora

17 July 2015 Training match	Braga (Portugal)	0–0	Aston Villa	Albufeira, Portugal
18:30 BST		Report		Stadium: Estadio Da Nora

21 July 2015 Friendly	Swindon Town	0–2	Aston Villa	Swindon
19:45 BST		Report	Sinclair 29'; Sellars 82'	Stadium: County Ground

22 July 2015 Friendly	Forest Green Rovers	0–3	Aston Villa XI	Nailsworth
19:30 BST		Report	Tonev 20'; Sellars 80' (pen.), 82'	Stadium: The New Lawn

25 July 2015 Friendly	Walsall	1–1	Aston Villa	Walsall
15:00 BST	Forde 44'	Report	Robinson 22'	Stadium: Banks's Stadium; Attendance: 6.606

28 July 2015 Friendly	Wolverhampton Wanderers	2–2	Aston Villa	Wolverhampton
19:45 BST	Edwards 72'; Afobe 89'	Report	Kozák 6', 76'	Stadium: Molineux; Attendance: 22,070

29 July 2015 Friendly	Tamworth	3–0	Aston Villa XI	Tamworth
19:30 BST	Newton 2'; Morrell 83', 90+2'	Report		Stadium: The Lamb Ground

1 August 2015 Friendly	Nottingham Forest	3–3	Aston Villa	Nottingham
15:00 BST	Blackstock 1'; Lansbury 80'; Wilson 90'	Report	Sinclair 21', 52', 64'	Stadium: City Ground

== Players ==
- 19 May: Scott Sinclair joins the club permanently, having been on loan during the previous season, after the club confirms its survival in the Premier League.
- 8 June: The club's record signing Darren Bent is released at the end of his contract, along with Enda Stevens and Graham Burke.
- 17 June: Micah Richards becomes Tim Sherwood's first official signing as manager, joining on a free transfer after the end of his contract at Manchester City.
- 18 June: Academy graduate Andreas Weimann joins Derby County after eight years at the club.
- 1 July: Former captain Ron Vlaar officially departs after rejecting a new contract offer from the club. Chris Herd is also officially released at the end of his contract.
- 9 July: Goalkeeper Mark Bunn joins the club on a free transfer, signing a two-year deal, after his contract expired at Norwich City.
- 10 July: Villa sign Senegalese defensive midfielder Idrissa Gueye from Lille for a fee believed to be £9 million. Shay Given leaves the club after four years, joining Stoke City on a free transfer after the final year of his contract was mutually terminated.
- 17 July: Club captain Fabian Delph performs a second u-turn in the space of a week, as he completes a move to Manchester City after they trigger his £8 million release clause. His departure from the club comes only six days after he allegedly turned down a move to City, in favour of staying at Villa.
- 18 July: Villa sign French left-back Jordan Amavi from Nice for an undisclosed fee, believed to be £9 million.
- 22 July: Christian Benteke completes a move to Liverpool after they trigger his £32.5 million release clause.
- 27 July: Ghanaian striker Jordan Ayew signs for Villa on a five-year deal from Lorient, for a fee in the region of £9 million.
- 28 July: Spanish fullback José Ángel Crespo signs for Villa from La Liga side Córdoba on a three-year deal for an undisclosed fee.
- 31 July: The club confirms its eighth and ninth signings of the summer as Jordan Veretout and Rudy Gestede both sign on five-year deals. The pair join from Nantes and Blackburn Rovers respectively. Nathan Baker signs a new four-year contract, the same day.
- 5 August: Ciaran Clark signs a new five-year contract at the club and Aly Cissokho joins Porto on a season-long loan. Cissokho is later recalled in December after injury rules out first choice left-back Jordan Amavi for the season.
- 7 August: Callum Robinson joins Bristol City on a season-long loan.
- 12 August: Ashley Westwood signs a new five-year contract with the club.
- 14 August: Spanish winger Adama Traoré signs for Villa from La Liga side Barcelona on a five-year deal for an undisclosed fee.
- 20 August: Leandro Bacuna signs a new five-year contract at the club.
- 21 August: Gary Gardner commits to the club for another three years.
- 1 September: On deadline day the club brings in three new players, as Joleon Lescott is signed from rivals West Bromwich Albion, Tiago Ilori joins on a season-long loan from Liverpool and 18-year-old Montenegrin goalkeeper Matija Sarkic, who will link up with the development squad, is recruited from Anderlecht. Nathan Baker leaves on a season-long loan to Bristol City and Joe Bennett joins Bournemouth on loan until January, after signing a new one-year extension to his contract earlier in the day.

=== First team squad ===
Squad no.	Player	Nationality	Position	Date of birth (age)	Apps	Goals	Notes
Goalkeepers
1	Brad Guzan	(United States)	GK	9 September 1984 (aged 31)	163	0	
13	Jed Steer HG^{1}	(England)	GK	23 September 1992 (aged 23)	4	0	On loan at Huddersfield Town.
31	Mark Bunn HG^{1}	(England)	GK	16 November 1984 (aged 31)	7	0	
Defenders
3	Joe Bennett HG^{1}	(England)	LB	28 March 1990 (aged 26)	38	1	On loan at Sheffield Wednesday.
4	Micah Richards (team captain) HG^{1}	(England)	CB / RB	24 June 1988 (aged 28)	22	2	
5	Jores Okore	(Denmark)	CB	11 August 1992 (aged 23)	42	1	
6	Ciaran Clark HG^{2}	(Republic of Ireland)	CB / LB	26 September 1989 (aged 26)	150	9	
16	Joleon Lescott HG^{1}	(England)	CB	16 August 1982 (aged 33)	17	3	
21	Alan Hutton	(Scotland)	RB	30 November 1984 (aged 31)	86	1	
23	Jordan Amavi U^{21}	(France)	LB	9 March 1994 (aged 22)	12	0	
26	Lewis Kinsella HG^{2}/U^{21}	(England)	LB	2 September 1994 (aged 21)	0	0	
32	Janoi Donacien HG^{2}	(Saint Lucia)	CB / RB	3 November 1993 (aged 22)	0	0	On loan at Newport County
33	José Ángel Crespo	(Spain)	LB / RB	9 February 1987 (aged 29)	2	0	On loan at Rayo Vallecano
43	Aly Cissokho	(France)	LB	15 September 1987 (aged 28)	34	0	
–	Nathan Baker HG^{2}	(England)	CB / LB	23 April 1991 (aged 25)	87	0	On loan at Bristol City
Midfielders
7	Leandro Bacuna	(Curaçao)	CM / RB / RWB	21 August 1991 (aged 24)	86	6	
8	Idrissa Gueye	(Senegal)	DM	26 September 1989 (aged 26)	24	1	
9	Scott Sinclair HG^{1}	(England)	LW / RW	25 March 1989 (aged 27)	34	9	
15	Ashley Westwood HG^{1}	(England)	CM	1 April 1990 (aged 26)	123	3	
17	Jordan Veretout	(France)	CM	1 March 1993 (aged 23)	21	0	
18	Kieran Richardson HG^{1}	(England)	LW / LB	21 October 1984 (aged 31)	36	0	
20	Adama Traoré U^{21}	(Spain)	RW	20 January 1996 (aged 20)	10	1	
22	Gary Gardner HG^{2}	(England)	CM	29 June 1992 (aged 24)	18	0	On loan at Nottingham Forest.
24	Carlos Sánchez	(Colombia)	DM	6 February 1986 (aged 30)	48	1	
25	Carles Gil	(Spain)	AM / RW	22 November 1992 (aged 23)	28	3	
28	Charles N'Zogbia HG^{1}	(France)	LW / AM	28 May 1986 (aged 30)	92	5	
38	Jordan Lyden HG^{2} / U^{21}	(Australia)	DM / CM / RB	1 January 1997 (aged 19)	2	0	
40	Jack Grealish HG^{2} / U^{21}	(England)	LW / AM	10 September 1995 (aged 20)	39	1	
Forwards
11	Gabriel Agbonlahor (club captain) HG^{2}	(England)	ST / LW / RW	13 October 1986 (aged 29)	364	84	
19	Jordan Ayew	(Ghana)	ST	11 September 1991 (aged 24)	24	5	
27	Libor Kozák	(Czech Republic)	ST	30 May 1989 (aged 27)	19	4	
37	Callum Robinson HG^{2} / U^{21}	(England)	ST	2 February 1995 (aged 21)	5	0	On loan at Preston North End
39	Rudy Gestede	(Benin)	ST	10 October 1988 (aged 27)	26	5	

- HG^{1} = Association-trained player
- HG^{2} = Club-trained player
- U^{21} = Under 21 players (Contract and Scholars)
- EXC = Excluded from 25-man Premier League squad (players loaned out not counted)

Last updated: 8 February 2016.
Source: AVFC

=== Transfers ===
In

Summer

Position	Player	Transferred from	Fee	Date	Source
MF	(England) Scott Sinclair	(England) Manchester City	Undisclosed (~ £2,500,000)	19 May 2015 (Note: Signing was made permanent following loan the previous season.)	
DF	(England) Micah Richards	(England) Manchester City	Free transfer	17 June 2015 (Note: Officially joined on 1 July 2015 following release from Manchester City.)	
GK	(England) Mark Bunn	(England) Norwich City	Free transfer	9 July 2015	
MF	(Senegal) Idrissa Gueye	(France) Lille	Undisclosed (~ £9,000,000)	10 July 2015	
DF	(France) Jordan Amavi	(France) Nice	Undisclosed (~ £9,000,000)	18 July 2015	
FW	(Ghana) Jordan Ayew	(France) Lorient	Undisclosed (~ £9,000,000)	27 July 2015	
DF	(Spain) José Ángel Crespo	(Spain) Córdoba	Undisclosed (~ £500,000)	28 July 2015	
MF	(France) Jordan Veretout	(France) Nantes	Undisclosed (~ £7,000,000)	31 July 2015	
FW	(Benin) Rudy Gestede	(England) Blackburn Rovers	Undisclosed (~ £6,000,000)	31 July 2015	
MF	(Spain) Adama Traoré	(Spain) Barcelona B	Undisclosed (~ £7,000,000)	14 August 2015	
DF	(England) Joleon Lescott	(England) West Bromwich Albion	Undisclosed (~£2,000,000)	1 September 2015	
GK	(Montenegro) Matija Sarkic (Note: Development squad player.)	(Belgium) Anderlecht	Undisclosed	1 September 2015	

Total incoming: ▼ Undisclosed (~ £52,000,000)

Out

Summer

Position	Player	Transferred to	Fee	Date	Source
FW	(England) Darren Bent	(England) Derby County (Note: Signed for Derby County on 8 June 2015 following release from club.)	Free transfer (~ Released)	8 June 2015	
DF	(Republic of Ireland) Enda Stevens	(England) Portsmouth (Note: Signed for Portsmouth on 15 June 2015 following release from club.)	Free transfer (~ Released)	8 June 2015	
FW	(Republic of Ireland) Graham Burke	(England) Notts County (Note: Signed for Notts County on 8 July 2015 following release from club.)	Free transfer (~ Released)	8 June 2015	
FW	(Austria) Andreas Weimann	(England) Derby County	Undisclosed (~ £2,750,000)	18 June 2015	
MF	(Mali) Yacouba Sylla	(France) Rennes	Undisclosed	22 June 2015	
DF	(England) Matthew Lowton	(England) Burnley	Undisclosed (~ £1,000,000)	22 June 2015	
MF	(Australia) Chris Herd	(England) Chesterfield (Note: Signed for Chesterfield on 11 September 2015 following release from club.)	Free transfer (~ Released)	1 July 2015	
DF	(Netherlands) Ron Vlaar	(Netherlands) AZ Alkmaar (Note: Signed for AZ on 7 December 2015 following release from club.)	Free transfer (~ End of contract) (Note: Rejected new contract offer from club.)	1 July 2015	
FW	(Denmark) Nicklas Helenius	(Denmark) Aalborg BK	Free transfer (~ Mutual termination)	3 July 2015	
DF	(Spain) Antonio Luna	(Spain) Eibar	Free transfer (~ Mutual termination)	9 July 2015	
GK	(Republic of Ireland) Shay Given	(England) Stoke City	Free transfer (~ Mutual termination)	10 July 2015	
MF	(England) Fabian Delph	(England) Manchester City	£8,000,000	17 July 2015	
FW	(Belgium) Christian Benteke	(England) Liverpool	£32,500,000	22 July 2015	
MF	(Bulgaria) Aleksandar Tonev	(Italy) Frosinone	Free transfer (~ Mutual termination)	27 August 2015	

Winter

Summer

Position:	Player	Transferred to	Fee	Date	Source
MF	(England) Joe Cole	(England) Coventry City	Free transfer	7 January 2016	
DF	(Switzerland) Philippe Senderos	(Switzerland) Grasshoppers (Note: Signed for Grasshoppers on 29 January 2016 following release from club.)	Free transfer (~ Mutual termination)	27 January 2016	

Total outgoing: ▲ Undisclosed (~ £44,250,000)

Loans

In

Summer

Position	Player	Loaned from	Date	Duration	Return date	Notes	Source
DF	(Portugal) Tiago Ilori	(England) Liverpool	1 September 2015	4 months	8 January 2016	Initially season-long; loan cancelled.	

Out

Summer

Position:	Player	Loaned to	Date	Duration	Return date	Notes	Source
DF	(France) Aly Cissokho	(Portugal) Porto	5 August 2015	Five-month	18 December 2015	Initially season-long; player recalled.	
FW	(England) Callum Robinson	(England) Bristol City	7 August 2015	Season-long	30 June 2016		
DF	(Saint Lucia) Janoi Donacien	(England) Wycombe Wanderers	21 August 2015	One-month	19 September 2015		
DF	(England) Nathan Baker	(England) Bristol City	1 September 2015	Season-long	30 June 2016		
DF	(England) Joe Bennett	(England) Bournemouth	1 September 2015	Four-month	22 December 2015		

Winter

Position	Player	Loaned to	Date	Duration	Return date	Notes	Source
GK	(England) Jed Steer	(England) Huddersfield Town	11 September 2015	Two-month	11 November 2015	Loan extended on 15/10/15.	
DF	(Saint Lucia) Janoi Donacien	(Wales) Newport County	24 September 2015	One-month	24 October 2015		
MF	(England) Joe Cole	(England) Coventry City	19 October 2015	One-month	24 November 2015		
DF	(Saint Lucia) Janoi Donacien	(Wales) Newport County	29 October 2015	Two-month	30 June 2016	Loan extended on 31/12/15.	
GK	(England) Jed Steer	(England) Huddersfield Town	26 November 2015	One-month	26 December 2015		
GK	(England) Jed Steer	(England) Huddersfield Town	2 January 2016	Six-month	30 June 2016		
FW	(England) Callum Robinson	(England) Preston North End	6 January 2015	Six-month	30 June 2016		
MF	(England) Gary Gardner	(England) Nottingham Forest	6 January 2015	Six-month	30 June 2016		
DF	(England) Joe Bennett	(England) Sheffield Wednesday	19 January 2015	Six-month	30 June 2016		
DF	(Spain) José Ángel Crespo	(Spain) Rayo Vallecano	20 January 2015	Six-month	30 June 2016		

Overall transfer activity

Spending

Summer: ▼ Undisclosed (~ £52,000,000)

Total: ▼ Undisclosed (~ £52,000,000)

Income

Summer: ▲ Undisclosed (~ £44,250,000)

Total: ▲ Undisclosed (~ £44,250,000)

Net expenditure

Summer: ▼ Undisclosed (~ £7,750,000)

Total: ▼ Undisclosed (~ £7,750,000)

=== Statistics ===
Appearances

No.	Nat.	Player	Premier League		FA Cup		League Cup		Total		Notes
No.	Nat.	Player	Start	Sub	Start	Sub	Start	Sub	Start	Sub	
Goalkeepers
1	(United States)	Guzan	28	–	2	–	2	–	32	0	
31	(England)	Bunn	10	–	1	–	1	–	12	0	
Defenders
2	(England)	Baker	–	–	–	–	1	–	1	0	(Note: Loaned to Bristol City on 1 September 2015.)
3	(England)	Bennett	–	–	–	–	–	1	0	1	(Note: Loaned to Bournemouth on 1 September 2015. Loan cancelled on 22 December 2015.) (Note: Loaned to Sheffield Wednesday on 20 January 2016.)
4	(England)	Richards	23	1	3	–	1	–	27	1	
5	(Denmark)	Okore	12	–	1	1	–	–	13	1	
6	(Republic of Ireland)	Clark	16	2	3	–	2	–	21	2	
16	(England)	Lescott	30	–	–	–	1	–	31	0	
21	(Scotland)	Hutton	26	2	–	–	2	–	28	2	
23	(France)	Amavi	9	1	–	–	2	–	11	1	
33	(Spain)	Crespo	1	–	–	–	1	–	2	0	(Note: Loaned to Rayo Vallecano on 20 January 2016.)
43	(France)	Cissokho	18	–	1	–	–	–	19	0	(Note: Recalled from season-long loan at Porto on 18 December 2015.)
46	(Republic of Ireland)	Toner	3	1	–	–	–	–	3	1	
Midfielders
7	(Curaçao)	Bacuna	27	4	2	–	2	–	31	4	
8	(Senegal)	Gueye	35	–	2	1	–	–	37	1	
9	(England)	Sinclair	19	8	3	–	2	1	24	9	
12	(England)	Cole	–	–	–	–	–	1	0	1	(Note: Loaned to Coventry City on 19 October 2015. Joined permanently on 7 January 2016.)
15	(England)	Westwood	31	1	3	–	2	–	36	1	
17	(France)	Veretout	21	4	–	2	2	–	23	6	
18	(England)	Richardson	8	3	2	–	2	–	12	3	
20	(Spain)	Traoré	–	10	–	–	1	–	1	10	
24	(Colombia)	Sánchez	16	4	1	–	2	–	19	4	
25	(Spain)	Gil	17	6	3	–	1	–	21	6	
28	(France)	N'Zogbia	–	2	–	–	–	–	0	2	
30	(England)	Green	-	2	-	-	-	-	0	2	
38	(Australia)	Lyden	2	2	–	–	–	–	2	2	
40	(England)	Grealish	9	7	1	1	1	2	12	9	
Forwards
11	(England)	Agbonlahor	13	2	–	1	2	–	14	4	
19	(Ghana)	Ayew	27	3	2	1	1	2	30	6	
27	(Czech Republic)	Kozák	3	1	–	–	–	1	3	2	
29	(England)	Hepburn-Murphy	-	1	-	-	-	-	0	1	
39	(Benin)	Gestede	14	18	2	–	2	–	18	18	

Notes

|} Last updated: 4 April 2016.
Source: World Football

- Players without appearances before going out on season-long loans.

Goalscorers
Correct as of 15 May 2016
Players with the same number of goals are listed by their position on the club's official website Source
Players highlighted in light grey denote the player had scored for the club before leaving for another club
Players highlighted in light cyan denote the player has scored for the club after arriving at Aston Villa during the season
Players highlighted in Blonde denote the player had scored for the club before leaving the club on loan for part/the rest of the season

Rank	Pos.	Nat.	Player	Premier League	FA Cup	League Cup	Total
1	FW	(Ghana)	Jordan Ayew	7	–	–	7
2	FW	(Benin)	Rudy Gestede	5	–	1	6
2	MF	(England)	Scott Sinclair	2	–	4	6
3	DF	(Republic of Ireland)	Ciaran Clark	1	1	–	2
3	DF	(England)	Micah Richards	1	1	–	2
3	MF	(England)	Ashley Westwood	2	–	–	2
3	MF	(Spain)	Carles Gil	2	–	–	2
4	DF	(England)	Joe Bennett	–	–	1	1
4	DF	(England)	Joleon Lescott	1	-	-	1
4	MF	(Senegal)	Idrissa Gueye	–	1	–	1
4	MF	(Spain)	Adama Traoré	–	–	1	1
4	MF	(England)	Jack Grealish	1	–	–	1
4	FW	(England)	Gabriel Agbonlahor	1	–	–	1
4	MF	(Curaçao)	Leandro Bacuna	1	–	–	1
Own Goals				3	–	–	3
Total				28	3	7	37

Assists

Correct as of 15 May 2016
Players with the same number of goals are listed by their position on the club's official website Source
Players highlighted in light grey denote the player had assisted for the club before leaving for another club
Players highlighted in light cyan denote the player has assisted for the club after arriving at Aston Villa during the season
Players highlighted in Blonde denote the player had assisted for the club before leaving the club on loan for part/the rest of the season

Rank	Pos.	Nat.	Player	Premier League	FA Cup	League Cup	Total
1	MF	(France)	Jordan Veretout	5	–	–	5
2	DF	(France)	Jordan Amavi	2	-	1	3
2	MF	(England)	Ashley Westwood	2	1	–	3
2	FW	(Benin)	Rudy Gestede	2	1	-	3
3	MF	(England)	Jack Grealish	–	–	2	2
3	FW	(England)	Gabriel Agbonlahor	2	–	–	2
4	DF	(England)	Micah Richards	1	–	–	1
4	DF	(Scotland)	Alan Hutton	1	–	–	1
4	MF	(England)	Joe Cole	–	–	1	1
4	MF	(England)	Kieran Richardson	1	–	–	1
4	MF	(Spain)	Adama Traoré	1	–	–	1
4	DF	(Republic of Ireland)	Kevin Toner	1	–	–	1
4	MF	(France)	Idrissa Gueye	1	-	-	1
4	MF	(Spain)	Carles Gil	-	1	-	1
Total				19	3	4	26

Disciplinary record

Correct as of 15 May 2016
Players are listed in descending order of (yellow card)
Players with the same number of cards are listed by their position on the club's official website Source
Players highlighted in light grey denote the player has received a yellow/red card for the club before leaving for another club
Players highlighted in light cyan denote the player has received a yellow/red card for the club after arriving at Aston Villa during the season
Players highlighted in blonde denote the player had received a yellow/red card for the club before leaving the club on loan for part/the rest of the season

No.	Nat.	Pos.	Player	Premier League			FA Cup			League Cup			Total		
No.	Nat.	Pos.	Player	Yellow card	(yellow card) (yellow-red card)	Red card	Yellow card	(yellow card) (yellow-red card)	Red card	Yellow card	(yellow card) (yellow-red card)	Red card	Yellow card	(yellow card) (yellow-red card)	Red card
15	(England)	MF	Ashley Westwood	4	–	–	2	–	–	1	–	–	7	0	0
19	(Ghana)	FW	Jordan Ayew	5	–	1	–	–	–	–	–	–	5	0	1
7	(Curaçao)	MF	Leandro Bacuna	5	–	–	1	–	–	–	–	–	6	0	0
6	(Republic of Ireland)	DF	Ciaran Clark	4	–	–	–	–	–	1	–	–	5	0	0
21	(Scotland)	DF	Alan Hutton	4	–	–	–	–	–	–	–	–	4	0	0
8	(Senegal)	MF	Idrissa Gueye	4	–	–	–	–	–	–	–	–	4	0	0
4	(England)	DF	Micah Richards	3	–	–	–	–	–	–	–	–	3	0	0
18	(England)	MF	Kieran Richardson	3	–	–	–	–	–	–	–	–	3	0	0
25	(Spain)	MF	Carles Gil	3	–	–	–	–	–	–	–	–	3	0	0
1	(United States)	GK	Brad Guzan	2	–	–	–	–	–	–	–	–	2	0	0
31	(England)	GK	Mark Bunn	1	–	–	–	–	–	1	–	–	2	0	0
24	(Colombia)	MF	Carlos Sánchez	2	–	–	–	–	–	–	–	–	2	0	0
23	(France)	DF	Jordan Amavi	2	–	–	–	–	–	–	–	–	2	0	0
17	(France)	MF	Jordan Veretout	2	–	–	–	–	–	–	–	–	2	0	0
39	(Benin)	FW	Rudy Gestede	2	–	–	–	–	–	–	–	–	2	0	0
16	(England)	DF	Joleon Lescott	1	–	–	–	–	–	–	–	–	1	0	0
43	(France)	DF	Aly Cissokho	1	–	–	–	–	–	–	–	–	1	0	0
25	(Spain)	MF	Adama Traoré	1	–	–	–	–	–	–	–	–	1	0	0
40	(England)	MF	Jack Grealish	1	–	–	–	–	–	–	–	–	1	0	0
11	(England)	FW	Gabriel Agbonlahor	–	–	–	–	–	–	1	–	–	1	0	0
			Totals	48	–	1	3	–	–	4	–	–	55	0	1

Notes

Suspensions

Player	Date Received	Offence	Length of suspension	
(England) Micah Richards	2/11/15	Post-match misconduct (26/10/15)	1 match	Tottenham Hotspur, Premier League
(Republic of Ireland) Ciaran Clark	(yellow card) v Watford, 28/11/15	5 cautions	1 match	Southampton, Premier League
(England) Ashley Westwood	(yellow card) v Norwich City, 28/12/15	5 cautions	1 match	Sunderland, Premier League
(Ghana) Jordan Ayew	(yellow card) v Norwich City, 28/12/15	5 cautions	1 match	Sunderland, Premier League
(Ghana) Jordan Ayew	(red card) v West Ham United, 30/1/16	Violent conduct	3 matches	Norwich, Liverpool, Stoke City, Premier League

Clean sheets

Includes all competitive matches.

Rank	No.	Pos.	Nat.	Player	Premier League	FA Cup	League Cup	Total
1	1	GK	(United States)	Brad Guzan	2	1	1	4
2	31	GK	(England)	Mark Bunn	4	–	–	4
				Totals	6	1	1	8
