= 2018–19 Olympique de Marseille season =

Olympique de Marseille
2018–19 season
- Chairman: Jacques-Henri Eyraud
- Manager: Rudi Garcia
- Stadium: Stade Vélodrome
- Ligue 1: 5th
- Coupe de France: Round of 64
- Coupe de la Ligue: Round of 16
- UEFA Europa League: Group stage
- Top goalscorer: League: Florian Thauvin (16); All: Florian Thauvin (18)
- Highest home attendance: League/All: 64,696 v. PSG (28 October 2018)
- Lowest home attendance: League: 41,932 v. Reims (2 December 2018); All: 8,200 v Strasbourg (19 December 2018, CdlL Ro16) (ignoring "0" punishment attendances of 20 Sep and 5 Feb)
- Average home league attendance: 50,369 includes "0" attendance of 5 Feb match v. Bordeaux
- Biggest win: 4–0 (twice); 10 August 2018 v. Toulouse; 16 September 2018 v. Guingamp
- Biggest defeat: 0–4 at Eintracht Frankfurt (9 November 2018, UEFA EL)
Home colours	Away colours	Third colours

The 2018–19 season was Olympique de Marseille's 69th professional season since its creation in 1899 and 23rd consecutive season in the top flight. The club participated in Ligue 1, Coupe de France, Coupe de la Ligue and the UEFA Europa League.

== Players ==
=== Squad ===
Note: Flags indicate national team as defined under FIFA eligibility rules; some limited exceptions apply. Players may hold more than one non-FIFA nationality.

No.	Pos.	Nation	Player
1	GK	FRA	Romain Cagnon
2	DF	JPN	Hiroki Sakai
4	DF	FRA	Boubacar Kamara
5	FW	ARG	Lucas Ocampos
6	DF	POR	Rolando
7	MF	SRB	Nemanja Radonjić
8	MF	FRA	Morgan Sanson
9	FW	ITA	Mario Balotelli
10	MF	FRA	Dimitri Payet (Captain)
11	FW	GRE	Kostas Mitroglou
12	MF	NED	Kevin Strootman
13	DF	TUN	Aymen Abdennour (on loan from Valencia)
14	FW	CMR	Clinton N'Jie
15	DF	CRO	Duje Ćaleta-Car

No.	Pos.	Nation	Player
16	GK	FRA	Yohann Pelé
17	DF	SEN	Bouna Sarr
18	DF	FRA	Jordan Amavi
19	MF	BRA	Luiz Gustavo (Vice-captain)
20	DF	FRA	Christopher Rocchia
22	MF	FRA	Grégory Sertic
23	DF	FRA	Adil Rami
25	DF	SVK	Tomáš Hubočan
26	FW	FRA	Florian Thauvin
27	MF	FRA	Maxime Lopez
28	FW	FRA	Valère Germain
30	GK	FRA	Steve Mandanda
40	GK	FRA	Florian Escales

=== Out on loan ===
Note: Flags indicate national team as defined under FIFA eligibility rules; some limited exceptions apply. Players may hold more than one non-FIFA nationality.

No. / Pos. / Nation / Player; — / MF / TUN / Saîf-Eddine Khaoui (on loan to Caen)	No. / Pos. / Nation / Player; — / FW / TUR / Yusuf Sari (on loan to Clermont)

=== Reserve squad ===
As of 23 August 2018.

Note: Flags indicate national team as defined under FIFA eligibility rules; some limited exceptions apply. Players may hold more than one non-FIFA nationality.

No.	Pos.	Nation	Player
—	GK	FRA	Geoffrey Agbolossou
—	GK	FRA	Amadou Dia
—	DF	FRA	Nassim Ahmed
—	DF	COM	Abdallah Ali Mohamed
—	DF	FRA	Dembo Gassama
—	DF	FRA	Niels Nkounkou
—	DF	FRA	Malik Ousfane
—	DF	FRA	Lucas Perrin
—	MF	FRA	Wassim Aouachira
—	MF	FRA	Ayem Assou
—	MF	FRA	Vincenzo Callejon

No.	Pos.	Nation	Player
—	MF	FRA	Cyril Khetir
—	MF	FRA	Sacha Marasović
—	MF	FRA	Kevan Mezine
—	MF	FRA	Alexandre Phliponeau
—	FW	FRA	Mehdi Baaloudj
—	FW	FRA	Mohamed Ben Fredj
—	FW	FRA	Florian Chabrolle
—	FW	FRA	Zacharie Iscaye
—	FW	FRA	Ayoub Ouhafsa
—	FW	FRA	Adel Santana

== Friendlies ==
11 July 2018 Friendly	Marseille	1–2	Béziers	Le Grau-du-Roi, France
18:00 CEST (UTC+2)	Mitroglou 9'		Kanté 31'; Rabillard 44'	Stadium: Stade Michel Mézy

13 July 2018 Friendly	Marseille	0–1	Saint-Étienne	Clermont-Ferrand, France
19:00 CEST (UTC+2)			Nordin 73' (pen.)	Stadium: Stade Gabriel-Montpied

18 July 2018 Friendly	Marseille	2–1	Nantes	La Roche-sur-Yon, France
19:30 CEST (UTC+2)	Mitroglou 42', 53'		Rongier 88'	Stadium: Stade Henri-Desgrange

21 July 2018 Friendly	Marseille	1–1	Villarreal	Le Pontet, France
19:00 CEST (UTC+2)	Germain 63'		Toko Ekambi 42'	Stadium: Stade de Fargues

25 July 2018 Friendly	Marseille	2–3	Real Betis	Faro, Portugal
20:00 CEST (UTC+2)	Hubočan 66'; N'Jie 90+2'		Loren 10'; Boudebouz 52' (pen.); Camarasa 81'	Stadium: Estádio Algarve

28 July 2018 Friendly	Sporting CP	1–1	Marseille	Lisbonne, Portugal
20:30 CEST (UTC+2)	Pinto 61'		Germain 4'	Stadium: Estádio José Alvalade XXI

4 August 2018 Friendly	Bournemouth	5–2	Marseille	Bournemouth, England
20:30 CEST (UTC+2)	Smith 1'; King 25', 34'; Fraser 47'; Wilson 50'		Germain 64'; Cabella 89'	Stadium: Vitality Stadium

== Competitions ==
=== Ligue 1 ===
==== League table ====
Pos	Team	Pld	W	D	L	GF	GA	GD	Pts	Qualification or relegation
3	Lyon	38	21	9	8	70	47	+23	72	Qualification to Champions League group stage
4	Saint-Étienne	38	19	9	10	59	41	+18	66	Qualification to Europa League group stage
5	Marseille	38	18	7	13	60	52	+8	61	
6	Montpellier	38	15	14	9	53	42	+11	59	
7	Nice	38	15	11	12	30	35	−5	56	

Source: Ligue 1 and Soccerway
Rules for classification: 1) Points; 2) Goal difference; 3) Head-to-head points; 4) Head-to-head goal difference; 5) Head-to-head goals scored; 6) Head-to-head away goals scored; 7) Goals scored; 8) Away goals scored; 9) Most goals scored in single league match; 10) Fairplay ranking.

==== Results summary ====
Overall								Home						Away					
Pld	W	D	L	GF	GA	GD	Pts	W	D	L	GF	GA	GD	W	D	L	GF	GA	GD
38	18	7	13	60	52	+8	61	11	4	4	31	17	+14	7	3	9	29	35	−6

Last updated: 24 May 2019.
Source: Results

==== Results by round ====
Round	1	2	3	4	5	6	7	8	9	10	11	12	13	14	15	16	17	18	19	20	21	22	23	24	25	26	27	28	29	30	31	32	33	34	35	36	37	38
Ground	H	A	H	A	H	A	H	A	H	A	H	A	H	A	H	A	A	H	A	H	A	H	A	A	H	A	H	H	A	H	A	H	A	H	A	H	A	H
Result	W	L	D	W	W	L	W	L	W	W	L	L	W	W	D	L	L	W	D	D	W	L	L	W	W	D	W	W	L	D	L	W	W	L	D	L	W	W
Position	1	9	9	5	2	5	3	6	3	4	5	6	6	5	5	5	5	6	6	9	7	7	10	6	5	5	4	4	4	5	5	5	5	6	6	6	6	5

Source: Results
A = Away; H = Home; W = Win; D = Draw; L = Loss

==== Results ====
10 August 2018 1	Marseille	4–0	Toulouse	Marseille
20:45 CEST (UTC+2)	Payet 45' (pen.), 62'; Amavi (yellow card) 46'; Germain 89'; Thauvin 90+2'	Report	Jullien (yellow card) 11'; Amian (yellow card) 44'; Sangaré (yellow card) 55'	Stadium: Stade Vélodrome; Attendance: 60,747; Referee: Ruddy Buquet

19 August 2018 2	Nîmes	3–1	Marseille	Nîmes
21:00 CEST (UTC+2)	Bouanga 34', (yellow card) 36'; Thioub 62'; Landre (yellow card) 68'; Diallo (yellow card) 74'; Ripart 87'	Report	Thauvin 49'; Sanson (yellow card) 72'	Stadium: Stade des Costières; Attendance: 15,285; Referee: Benoît Bastien

26 August 2018 3	Marseille	2–2	Rennes	Marseille
21:00 CEST (UTC+2)	Kamara (yellow card) 20'; Ocampos 54'; Bensebaini 72' (o.g.)	Report	Bourigeaud 38' (pen.); Sarr 45+1'; André (yellow card) 90'	Stadium: Stade Vélodrome; Attendance: 55,525; Referee: Antony Gautier

2 September 2018 4	Monaco	2–3	Marseille	Monaco
21:00 CEST (UTC+2)	Glik (yellow card) 35'; Tielemans 48'; Falcao 53'	Report	Mitroglou 45+1'; Thauvin 74'; Amavi (yellow card) 78'; Germain 90+1'	Stadium: Stade Louis II; Attendance: 14,269; Referee: Benoît Millot

16 September 2018 5	Marseille	4–0	Guingamp	Marseille
21:00 CEST (UTC+2)	Ocampos (yellow card) 32'; Thauvin 57', 80'; Payet 73'; Mitroglou 83'	Report	Eboa Eboa (yellow card) 54'	Stadium: Stade Vélodrome; Attendance: 50,450; Referee: Amaury Delerue

23 September 2018 6	Lyon	4–2	Marseille	Décines-Charpieu
21:00 CEST (UTC+2)	Aouar 28'; Diop (yellow card) 29'; Traoré 51', 60'; Fekir 74' (pen.)	Report	Strootman (yellow card) 35'; Thauvin 39'; Luiz Gustavo (yellow card) 66'; N'Jie 82'; Ćaleta-Car (red card) 83'	Stadium: Groupama Stadium; Attendance: 57,287; Referee: Clément Turpin

26 September 2018 7	Marseille	3–2	Strasbourg	Marseille
19:00 CEST (UTC+2)	Payet 41' (pen.); Sanson 44', (yellow card) 59'; Thauvin (yellow card) 50'; Amavi (red card) 52'; Luiz Gustavo (yellow card) 60'; Germain 90+1'	Report	Lala 27'; Thomasson (yellow card) 33'; Carole (yellow card) 49'; Grimm (yellow card) 79'; Da Costa 89'	Stadium: Stade Vélodrome; Attendance: 47,099; Referee: François Letexier

30 September 2018 8	Lille	3–0	Marseille	Villeneuve-d'Ascq
21:00 CEST (UTC+2)	Xeka (yellow card) 18'; Pépé 65' (pen.); Bamba 86' (pen.), 89'	Report	Ocampos (yellow card) 17'; Mandanda (yellow card) 63'; Luiz Gustavo (yellow card) 85'	Stadium: Stade Pierre-Mauroy; Attendance: 41,623; Referee: Mikael Lesage

7 October 2018 9	Marseille	2–0	Caen	Marseille
17:00 CEST (UTC+2)	Mitroglou 36'; Thauvin 45'; Luiz Gustavo (yellow card) 66'; Payet (yellow card) 66'; Ocampos (yellow card) 75'	Report	Crivelli (yellow card) 26'; Ninga (yellow card) 45+5'; Guilbert (yellow card) 66'; Baysse (yellow card) 66'; Djiku (yellow card) 90+2'	Stadium: Stade Vélodrome; Attendance: 55,935; Referee: Benoît Millot

21 October 2018 10	Nice	0–1	Marseille	Nice
21:00 CEST (UTC+2)	Attal (yellow card) 59'; Dante (yellow card) 84'; Balotelli (yellow card) 87'	Report	Sanson 42'; Radonjić (yellow card) 90+1'	Stadium: Allianz Riviera; Attendance: 30,754; Referee: Amaury Delerue

28 October 2018 11	Marseille	0–2	Paris Saint-Germain	Marseille
21:00 CET (UTC+1)	Ocampos (yellow card) 81'; Strootman (yellow card) 86'; Amavi (yellow card) 90+1'; Luiz Gustavo (yellow card) 90+2'	Report	Kehrer (yellow card) 43'; Di María (yellow card) 52'; Mbappé 65'; Draxler 90+5'	Stadium: Stade Vélodrome; Attendance: 64,696; Referee: Benoît Bastien

4 November 2018 12	Montpellier	3–0	Marseille	Montpellier
21:00 CET (UTC+1)	Laborde 51', 62'; Lasne 70'	Report	Thauvin (yellow card) 30'; Sanson (yellow card) 53'; Luiz Gustavo (yellow card) 88'	Stadium: Stade de la Mosson; Attendance: 19,683; Referee: Antony Gautier

11 November 2018 13	Marseille	2–0	Dijon	Marseille
17:00 CET (UTC+1)	Ocampos 45+3'; Rami 84'	Report	Lautoa (yellow card) 12'; Ciman (yellow card) 44'	Stadium: Stade Vélodrome; Attendance: 47,430; Referee: Willy Delajod

25 November 2018 14	Amiens	1–3	Marseille	Amiens
21:00 CET (UTC+1)	Dibassy 8'; Monconduit (yellow card) 49'; Lefort (yellow card) 83'	Report	Rolando (yellow card) 14'; Thauvin 26', 80', 90+1'; Ocampos (yellow card) 72'; Sarr (yellow card) 72'	Stadium: Stade de la Licorne; Attendance: 11,932; Referee: Jérôme Miguelgorry

2 December 2018 15	Marseille	0–0	Reims	Marseille
17:00 CET (UTC+1)	Lopez (yellow card) 57'; Thauvin (yellow card) 82'	Report	Cafaro (yellow card) 61'	Stadium: Stade Vélodrome; Attendance: 41,932; Referee: Nicolas Rainville

5 December 2018 16	Nantes	3–2	Marseille	Nantes
19:00 CET (UTC+1)	Sala 30'; Touré 45+1'; Boschilia 63'	Report	Strootman (yellow card) 15'; Sanson 28'; Thauvin 36' (pen.)	Stadium: Stade de la Beaujoire; Attendance: 32,663; Referee: François Letexier

22 December 2018 19	Angers	1–1	Marseille	Angers
21:00 CET (UTC+1)	Bahoken 35'; Traoré (yellow card) 69'	Report	Lopez (yellow card) 22'; Sanson (yellow card) 43'; Thauvin (yellow card) 69'; Sarr 84'	Stadium: Stade Raymond Kopa; Attendance: 13,473; Referee: Jérôme Brisard

13 January 2019 20	Marseille	1–1	Monaco	Marseille
21:00 CET (UTC+1)	Lopez 13'; Sanson (yellow card) 58'; Ocampos (yellow card) 74'	Report	Tielemans 38'; Sylla (yellow card) 79'	Stadium: Stade Vélodrome; Attendance: 44,315; Referee: Mikael Lesage

16 January 2019 17	Saint-Étienne	2–1	Marseille	Nantes
21:00 CET (UTC+1)	Khazri 59' (pen.), 88'	Report	Strootman 16'	Stadium: Stade de la Beaujoire; Attendance: 28,146; Referee: Antony Gautier
Note: The match, originally scheduled for 9 December 2018, was postponed due to security concerns as a result of the yellow vests movement.

20 January 2019 21	Caen	0–1	Marseille	Caen
17:00 CET (UTC+1)	Crivelli (yellow card) 6'; Ninga (yellow card) 30'; Guilbert (yellow card) 45+1', (red card) 51'; Bammou (yellow card) 49'; Sankoh (yellow card) 89'	Report	Strootman (yellow card) 6'; Amavi (yellow card) 35'; Sanson 47'; Sarr (yellow card) 61'	Stadium: Stade Michel d'Ornano; Attendance: 19,607; Referee: Frank Schneider

25 January 2019 22	Marseille	1–2	Lille	Marseille
20:45 CET (UTC+1)	Kamara (yellow card) 18'; Luiz Gustavo (yellow card) 45'; Strootman (yellow card) 45'; Radonjić (yellow card) 56'; Thauvin (red card) 67'; Rolando (yellow card) 90'; Balotelli 90+5'	Report	Pépé 45+3' (pen.), 90+4'; Soumaoro (yellow card) 51'; Leão (yellow card) 66'; Xeka (yellow card) 70'	Stadium: Stade Vélodrome; Attendance: 45,940; Referee: Amaury Delerue

2 February 2019 23	Reims	2–1	Marseille	Reims
21:00 CET (UTC+1)	Dingomé 21', (yellow card) 59'; Romao (yellow card) 29'; Suk 68'; Oudin (yellow card) 90+2'	Report	N'Jie 86'	Stadium: Stade Auguste Delaune; Attendance: 20,546; Referee: François Letexier

5 February 2019 18	Marseille	1–0	Bordeaux	Marseille
19:00 CET (UTC+1)	Kamara 42'; Sakai (yellow card) 55'; Sanson (yellow card) 61'; Sertic (yellow card) 90+2'	Report	Kalu (red card) 25'; Otávio (yellow card) 77'; Sankharé (yellow card) 89'	Stadium: Stade Vélodrome; Attendance: 0 Referee: Jérôme Brisard
Note: The match, originally scheduled for 16 December 2018, was postponed due to security concerns as a result of the yellow vests movement. The match was played behind closed doors as Marseille were punished for crowd trouble in their game against Lille.

8 February 2019 24	Dijon	1–2	Marseille	Dijon
20:45 CET (UTC+01:00)	Marié 18'; Yambéré (yellow card) 43'; Lautoa (yellow card) 50'; Chafik (yellow card) 90+3'	Report	Balotelli 56', (yellow card) 81'; Sanson (yellow card) 72'; Ocampos 74'; Kamara (yellow card) 90+5'	Stadium: Stade Gaston Gérard; Attendance: 15,095; Referee: Thomas Leonard

16 February 2019 25	Marseille	2–0	Amiens	Marseille
17:00 CET (UTC+01:00)	Thauvin 19'; Balotelli 25'; Amavi (yellow card) 49'	Report		Stadium: Stade Vélodrome; Attendance: 50,871; Referee: Johan Hamel

24 February 2019 26	Rennes	1–1	Marseille	Rennes
17:00 CET (UTC+1)	André 7', (yellow card) 34'; Bourigeaud (yellow card) 73'; Sarr (yellow card) 79'; Gelin (yellow card) 84'	Report	Balotelli (yellow card) 38'; Germain 56', (yellow card) 67'; Lopez (yellow card) 79'; Amavi (red card) 90+4'	Stadium: Roazhon Park; Attendance: 28,014; Referee: Mikael Lesage

3 March 2019 27	Marseille	2–0	Saint-Étienne	Marseille
21:00 CET (UTC+1)	Sakai (yellow card) 5'; Balotelli 12'; Thauvin 21' (pen.); Sarr (yellow card) 25'	Report	Debuchy (yellow card) 19'; Khazri (yellow card) 85'	Stadium: Stade Vélodrome; Attendance: 57,337; Referee: Clément Turpin

10 March 2019 28	Marseille	1–0	Nice	Marseille
21:00 CET (UTC+1)	Ocampos (yellow card) 58'; Balotelli 61'; Kamara (yellow card) 69'	Report	Hérelle (yellow card) 90'	Stadium: Stade Vélodrome; Attendance: 50,935; Referee: Benoît Bastien

17 March 2019 29	Paris Saint-Germain	3–1	Marseille	Paris
21:00 CET (UTC+1)	Thiago Silva (yellow card) 17'; Kurzawa (yellow card) 26'; Mbappé 45+2'; Di María 55', 66', (yellow card) 39'; Kimpembe (yellow card) 58'	Report	Kamara (yellow card) 29'; Germain 46'; Ocampos (yellow card) 58'; Mandanda (red card) 62'; Sakai (yellow card) 89'	Stadium: Parc des Princes; Attendance: 47,647; Referee: Antony Gautier

30 March 2019 30	Marseille	2–2	Angers	Marseille
17:00 CET (UTC+1)	Balotelli 4', 16'; Lopez (yellow card) 23'; Ocampos (yellow card) 26'; Sarr (yellow card) 40' (yellow-red card) 78'	Report	Mangani 36' (pen.), 76' (pen.); Pajot (yellow card) 58'	Stadium: Stade Vélodrome; Attendance: 53,507; Referee: Jérôme Miguelgorry

5 April 2019 31	Bordeaux	2–0	Marseille	Bordeaux
20:45 CEST (UTC+2)	Kamano 27' (pen.); Koundé (yellow card) 68'; De Préville 71'; Pablo (yellow card) 81', (red card) 82'	Report	Payet (yellow card) 45+2'; Kamara (yellow card) 61'; Balotelli (yellow card) 83'	Stadium: Matmut Atlantique; Attendance: 34,152; Referee: Hakim Ben El Hadj

13 April 2019 32	Marseille	2–1	Nîmes	Marseille
17:00 CEST (UTC+2)	Ćaleta-Car (yellow card) 24'; Germain 72'; Luiz Gustavo 73'	Report	Savanier (yellow card) 18', (goal) 82' (pen.); Maouassa (yellow card) 70'	Stadium: Stade Vélodrome; Attendance: 62,614; Referee: Frank Schneider

20 April 2019 33	Guingamp	1–3	Marseille	Guingamp
17:00 CEST (UTC+2)	Merghem (yellow card) 36'; Ngbakoto 56'; Sorbon (yellow card) 79'	Report	Luiz Gustavo 4'; Ocampos 40', (yellow card) 90'; Thauvin (yellow card) 60'; Sanson (yellow card) 64'; Germain 90+1'	Stadium: Stade de Roudourou; Attendance: 18,164; Referee: Mikael Lesage

28 April 2019 34	Marseille	1–2	Nantes	Marseille
21:00 CEST (UTC+2)	Ocampos (yellow card) 17'; Balotelli 25', (yellow card) 41'; Payet (yellow card) 32'; Luiz Gustavo (yellow card) 45+2'	Report	Moutoussamy 22'; Traoré (yellow card) 42'; Girotto 50'	Stadium: Stade Vélodrome; Attendance: 51,969; Referee: Johan Hamel

3 May 2019 35	Strasbourg	1–1	Marseille	Strasbourg
20:45 CEST (UTC+2)	Lala 65'; Ajorque (yellow card) 89'	Report	Germain 48'; Strootman (yellow card) 51'; Rami (yellow card) 64'	Stadium: Stade de la Meinau; Attendance: 25,962; Referee: Jérôme Miguelgorry

12 May 2019 36	Marseille	0–3	Lyon	Marseille
21:00 CEST (UTC+2)	Balotelli (yellow card) 31'; Amavi (yellow card) 34'; Ćaleta-Car (red card) 67'; Strootman (yellow card) 86'	Report	Terrier (yellow card) 21'; Cornet 24', 86'; Dembélé 84'	Stadium: Stade Vélodrome; Attendance: 61,926; Referee: Ruddy Buquet

18 May 2019 37	Toulouse	2–5	Marseille	Toulouse
21:00 CEST (UTC+2)	Jullien (yellow card) 22'; Leya Iseka 26'; Gradel 61'	Report	Sanson 29'; Amavi (yellow card) 39'; Sakai 50'; Rami (yellow card) 58'; N'Jie 76'; Thauvin 90', 90+1'	Stadium: Stadium Municipal; Attendance: 24,293; Referee: Frank Schneider

24 May 2019 38	Marseille	1–0	Montpellier	Marseille
21:05 CEST (UTC+2)	Sanson (yellow card) 11'; Thauvin 55'; Balotelli (red card) 87'; Hubočan (yellow card) 89'	Report		Stadium: Stade Vélodrome; Attendance: 53,788; Referee: Antony Gautier

=== Coupe de France ===
6 January 2019 Round of 64	ASF Andrézieux	2–0	Marseille	Saint-Étienne
14:15 CET (UTC+1)	Ngwabije 17'; Milla 82', (yellow card) 83'	Report	Luiz Gustavo (yellow card) 36'; Ćaleta-Car (yellow card) 43'; Amavi (yellow card) 66'	Stadium: Stade Geoffroy-Guichard; Attendance: 13,313; Referee: Eric Wattellier

=== Coupe de la Ligue ===
19 December 2018 Round of 16	Marseille	1–1 (2–4 p)	Strasbourg	Marseille
21:05 CET (UTC+1)	Luiz Gustavo 80'; Payet (yellow card) 89'	Report	Martin 18' (pen.), (yellow card) 89'	Stadium: Stade Vélodrome; Attendance: 8,200; Referee: Ruddy Buquet
	Penalties
	Lopez (penalty scored); Payet (penalty missed); Luiz Gustavo (penalty scored); Rami (penalty missed)		(penalty scored) Liénard; (penalty scored) Thomasson; (penalty scored) Mothiba; (penalty scored) Martin

=== UEFA Europa League ===
==== Group stage ====
Pos	Team	Pld	W	D	L	GF	GA	GD	Pts	Qualification	FRA	LAZ	APL	MAR
1	(Germany) Eintracht Frankfurt	6	6	0	0	17	5	+12	18	Advance to knockout phase	—	4–1	2–0	4–0
2	(Italy) Lazio	6	3	0	3	9	11	−2	9	Advance to knockout phase	1–2	—	2–1	2–1
3	(Cyprus) Apollon Limassol	6	2	1	3	10	10	0	7		2–3	2–0	—	2–2
4	(France) Marseille	6	0	1	5	6	16	−10	1		1–2	1–3	1–3	—

Source: UEFA

20 September 2018 1	Marseille (France)	1–2	(Germany) Eintracht Frankfurt	Marseille, France
18:55 CEST (UTC+02:00)	Ocampos 3'	Report	Willems (yellow card) 16' (yellow-red card) 59'; Torró 52'; Jović 89'	Stadium: Stade Vélodrome; Attendance: 0 Referee: Matej Jug (Slovenia)
Note: The Marseille v Eintracht Frankfurt match was played behind closed doors due to punishment by UEFA.

4 October 2018 2	Apollon Limassol (Cyprus)	2–2	(France) Marseille	Nicosia, Cyprus
21:00	Carayol (yellow card) 45+1'; Papoulis (yellow card) 57'; Marković 74'; Zelaya 90'	Report	Payet 50', (yellow card) 79'; Kamara (yellow card) 62'; Luiz Gustavo 67'; Amavi (yellow card) 88'	Stadium: GSP Stadium; Attendance: 3,031; Referee: Harald Lechner (Austria)

25 October 2018 3	Marseille (France)	1–3	(Italy) Lazio	Marseille, France
21:00	Sakai (yellow card) 44'; Strootman (yellow card) 45+1'; Payet (yellow card) 68', (goal) 86'	Report	Wallace 10'; Radu (yellow card) 30'; Lulić (yellow card) 33'; Caicedo 59'; Parolo (yellow card) 74'; Marušić 90'	Stadium: Stade Vélodrome; Attendance: 31,930; Referee: Jesús Gil Manzano (Spain)

8 November 2018 4	Lazio (Italy)	2–1	(France) Marseille	Rome, Italy
18:55	Wallace (yellow card) 27'; Parolo 45+1'; Correa 55'; Milinković-Savić (yellow card) 83'	Report	Ocampos (yellow card) 22'; Thauvin (yellow card) 39', (goal) 60'; Rami (yellow card) 52'; N'Jie (yellow card) 87'; Strootman (yellow card) 88'	Stadium: Stadio Olimpico; Attendance: 14,705; Referee: Vladislav Bezborodov (Russia)

29 November 2018 5	Eintracht Frankfurt (Germany)	4–0	(France) Marseille	Frankfurt, Germany
21:00	Jović 2', 67'; Luiz Gustavo 17' (o.g.); Fernandes (yellow card) 33'; Sarr 62' (o.g.); Kostić (yellow card) 90'	Report	Luiz Gustavo (yellow card) 71'	Stadium: Commerzbank-Arena; Attendance: 47,000; Referee: John Beaton (Scotland)

13 December 2018 6	Marseille (France)	1–3	(Cyprus) Apollon Limassol	Marseille, France
18:55	Kamara (red card) 8'; Thauvin 11'; Sarr (yellow card) 61'; Luiz Gustavo (yellow card) 64'; Ocampos (yellow card) 71' (yellow-red card) 90+3'; Ćaleta-Car (yellow card) 90'	Report	Maglica 8' (pen.), 30'; Marković (yellow card) 49'; Stylianou 56'	Stadium: Stade Vélodrome; Attendance: 9,274; Referee: Radu Petrescu (Romania)

== Statistics ==
=== Appearances and goals ===
No.	Pos	Nat	Player	Total		Ligue 1		Coupe de France		Coupe de la Ligue		UEFA Europa League	
No.	Pos	Nat	Player	Apps	Goals	Apps	Goals	Apps	Goals	Apps	Goals	Apps	Goals
Goalkeepers
1	GK	(France) FRA	Romain Cagnon	0	0	0	0	0	0	0	0	0	0
16	GK	(France) FRA	Yohann Pelé	13	0	7+2	0	0	0	0	0	4	0
30	GK	(France) FRA	Steve Mandanda	34	0	31	0	1	0	1	0	1	0
40	GK	(France) FRA	Florian Escales	1	0	0	0	0	0	0	0	1	0
Defenders
2	DF	(Japan) JPN	Hiroki Sakai	32	1	26+1	1	0	0	1	0	4	0
4	DF	(France) FRA	Boubacar Kamara	36	1	27+4	1	0	0	0	0	5	0
6	DF	(Portugal) POR	Rolando	13	0	9+1	0	1	0	1	0	0+1	0
15	DF	(Croatia) CRO	Duje Ćaleta-Car	26	0	17+3	0	1	0	0	0	5	0
17	DF	(Senegal) SEN	Bouna Sarr	37	1	25+4	1	1	0	0+1	0	2+4	0
18	DF	(France) FRA	Jordan Amavi	30	0	24+4	0	1	0	1	0	0	0
23	DF	(France) FRA	Adil Rami	21	1	16	1	0	0	1	0	4	0
25	DF	(Slovakia) SVK	Tomáš Hubočan	3	0	0+2	0	0	0	0	0	1	0
Midfielders
7	MF	(Serbia) SRB	Nemanja Radonjić	22	0	7+10	0	0+1	0	0	0	2+2	0
8	MF	(France) FRA	Morgan Sanson	37	5	27+6	5	1	0	1	0	2	0
10	MF	(France) FRA	Dimitri Payet	38	6	23+8	4	1	0	1	0	4+1	2
12	MF	(Netherlands) NED	Kevin Strootman	34	1	21+7	1	0+1	0	0	0	5	0
19	MF	(Brazil) BRA	Luiz Gustavo	38	4	26+4	2	1	0	1	1	5+1	1
27	MF	(France) FRA	Maxime Lopez	39	1	25+7	1	0+1	0	1	0	5	0
31	MF	(France) FRA	Florian Chabrolle	1	0	0	0	0	0	0	0	0+1	0
Forwards
5	FW	(Argentina) ARG	Lucas Ocampos	40	5	31+3	4	1	0	1	0	4	1
9	FW	(Italy) ITA	Mario Balotelli	15	8	12+3	8	0	0	0	0	0	0
14	FW	(Cameroon) CMR	Clinton N'Jie	21	3	3+14	3	0	0	0+1	0	1+2	0
26	FW	(France) FRA	Florian Thauvin	37	18	30+3	16	1	0	0	0	3	2
28	FW	(France) FRA	Valère Germain	42	8	23+13	8	1	0	1	0	2+2	0
Players transferred out during the season
11	FW	(Greece) GRE	Kostas Mitroglou	20	3	7+7	3	0	0	0+1	0	3+2	0
13	DF	(Tunisia) TUN	Aymen Abdennour	0	0	0	0	0	0	0	0	0	0
20	DF	(France) FRA	Christopher Rocchia	2	0	0+1	0	0	0	0	0	0+1	0
22	MF	(France) FRA	Grégory Sertic	5	0	1+3	0	0	0	0	0	0+1	0

Last updated: 24 May 2019
Source: Competitions

=== Goalscorers ===
As of match played 17 September 2018

Place	Position	Nation	Number	Name	Ligue 1	Coupe de France	Coupe de la Ligue	Europa League	Total
1	FW	(France)	26	Florian Thauvin	13	0	0	2	15
2	MF	(France)	10	Dimitri Payet	4	0	0	2	6
3	FW	(France)	28	Valère Germain	4	0	0	0	4
4	FW	(Greece)	11	Kostas Mitroglou	3	0	0	0	3
5	FW	(Argentina)	5	Lucas Ocampos	3	0	0	1	4
			Own goal	1	0	0	0	0	
TOTALS					27	0	0	5	32
