= Pierre Vignaud =

French footballer (born 1983)

Personal information
- Date of birth: 10 March 1983 (age 43)
- Place of birth: Semur-en-Auxois, France
- Height: 1.74 m (5 ft 9 in)
- Position: Left-back

Youth career
- 1996–2006: AJ Auxerre
- 2006–2008: Rouen

Senior career*
Years	Team	Apps	(Gls)
2009–2013	Rouen	194	(10)
2013–2015	Amiens	54	(0)
2015–2019	Quevilly	68	(1)
2017–2019	Quevilly II	17	(0)
2019–2020	Grand-Quevilly	4	(0)

Managerial career
- 2020–: Grand-Quevilly (coach)
- * Club domestic league appearances and goals

Pierre Vignaud (born 10 March 1983) is a French former professional footballer who played as a left-back who is coach of Avallon FCO.

== Playing career ==
Vignaud begun his footballing training at the academy of AJ Auxerre, where he stayed for 10 years. He became a long-time player and legend for Rouen, and rejoined the club when it merged with US Quevilly-Rouen Vignaud made his professional debut for Quevilly in a 1–0 Coupe de la Ligue loss to US Orléans on 8 August 2017, at the age of 34. He made his Ligue 2 debut in a 4–1 loss to Football Bourg-en-Bresse Péronnas 01 on 11 August 2017.

After four years with Quevilly-Rouen, he signed for Régional 1 side Grand-Quevilly FC, where he made his debut in the fifth round of the Coupe de France against AS Tréport on 13 October 2019.

== Coaching career ==
After becoming injured in November 2019, Vignaud was appointed as a coach of Grand-Quevilly in January 2020.
