= Kévin Gomis =

French-Senegalese footballer (born 1989)

Personal information
- Full name: Kévin Mickael Junior Gomis
- Date of birth: 20 January 1989 (age 37)
- Place of birth: Paris, France
- Height: 1.86 m (6 ft 1 in)
- Position: Centre back

Youth career
- 2005–2008: Guingamp

Senior career*
Years	Team	Apps	(Gls)
2008–2009	Guingamp B	22	(0)
2009–2011	Naval	44	(2)
2011–2016	Nice	56	(0)
2014	→ Nottingham Forest (loan)	1	(0)
2016–2017	Dundee	22	(0)
2018–2020	Grand Quevilly FC		
- * Club domestic league appearances and goals as of 17 January 2018

Kévin Mickael Junior Gomis (born 20 January 1989) is a French former professional footballer who played as a central defender.

== Football career ==
Born in Paris, Gomis started his professional career with En Avant de Guingamp, but only played officially with the reserves. In summer 2009 he signed a two-year contract at Portuguese club Associação Naval 1º de Maio, being joined by countryman manager Victor Zvunka the following year.

Gomis appeared in his first Primeira Liga match on 29 August 2009, playing the full 90 minutes in a 1–3 home loss against FC Porto. He finished his first season with 23 games (all starts), as the Figueira da Foz side ranked in a best-ever eighth position.

In late 2011, after his link to Naval expired, Gomis returned to his country and signed for three years with OGC Nice. He made his Ligue 1 debut on 6 August, coming on as a second half substitute in a 1–3 home defeat against Olympique Lyonnais.

Gomis joined Nottingham Forest in January 2014, on loan for the remainder of the campaign. He made his only appearance for the English on 8 March, starting and being booked in a 0–1 loss at Barnsley for the Football League Championship, being subsequently left out of the selection reckoning reportedly due to caretaker manager Gary Brazil's opinion that his attitude was unconstructive.

On 19 August 2016, Gomis signed for Scottish Premiership club Dundee on a one-year contract.

On 19 November 2018, he signed for Grand Quevilly FC, in 6th level in france. He would retire in 2020.

== Club statistics ==
As of 23 May 2017

Club	Season	League			Cup		League Cup		Europe		Total	
Club	Season	Division	Apps	Goals	Apps	Goals	Apps	Goals	Apps	Goals	Apps	Goals
Naval	2009–10	Primeira Liga	23	0	6	0	2	0	—		31	0
Naval	2010–11	Primeira Liga	21	2	1	0	1	0	—		23	2
Naval	Total		44	2	7	0	3	0	—		54	2
Nice	2011–12	Ligue 1	15	0	2	0	3	0	—		20	0
Nice	2012–13	Ligue 1	13	0	2	0	3	0	—		18	0
Nice	2013–14	Ligue 1	9	0	2	0	0	0	2	0	13	0
Nice	2014–15	Ligue 1	16	0	0	0	0	0	—		16	0
Nice	2015–16	Ligue 1	3	0	0	0	0	0	—		3	0
Nice	Total		56	0	6	0	6	0	2	0	70	0
Nottingham Forest	2013–14	Championship	1	0	0	0	0	0	—		1	0
Dundee	2016–17	Scottish Premiership	22	0	0	0	0	0	—		22	0
Career total			123	2	13	0	9	0	2	0	147	2
