= Marc Massion =

French politician

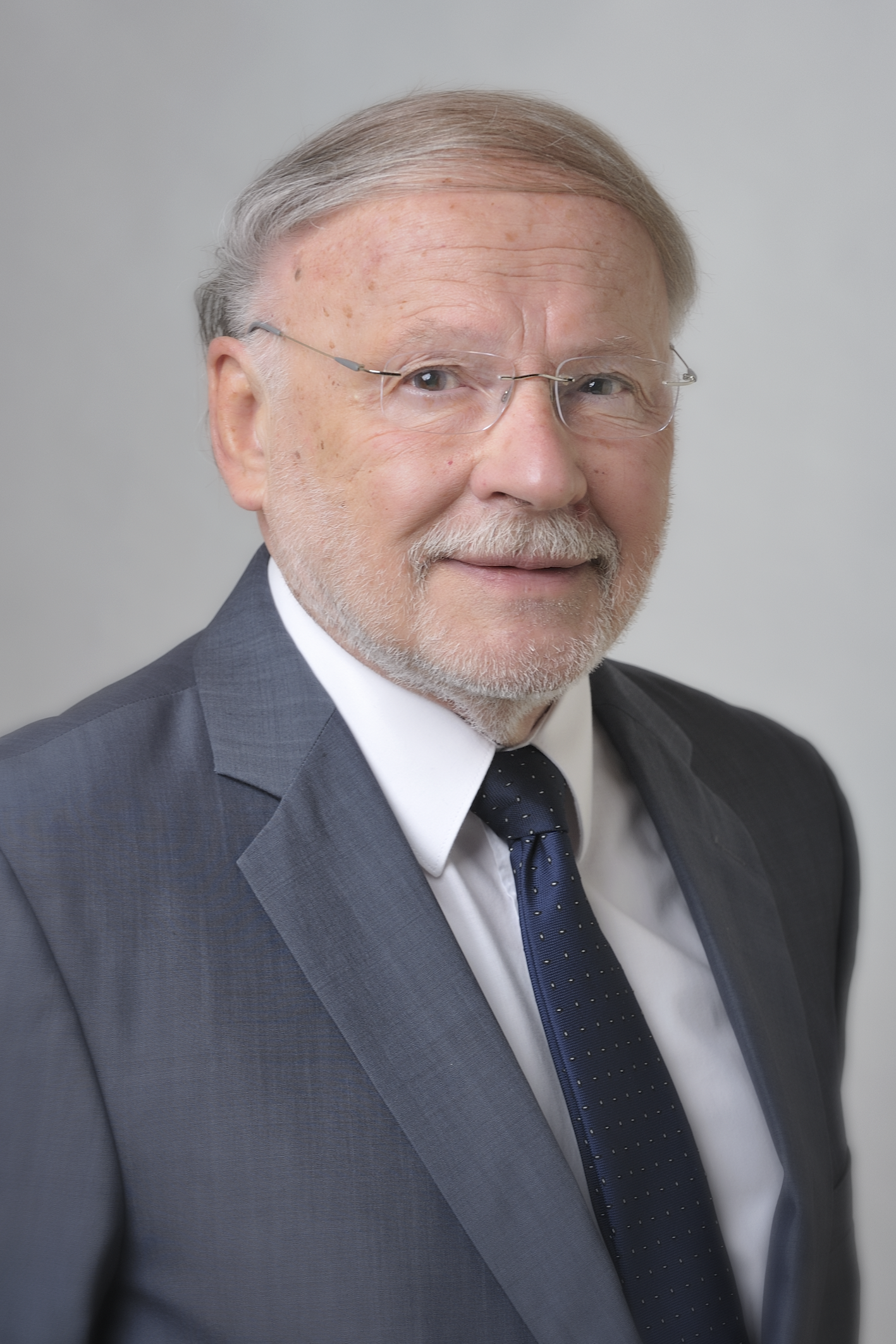
Portrait of Marc Massion.

Marc Massion (born 12 November 1935) is a former member of the Senate of France, representing the Seine-Maritime department. He is a member of the Socialist Party. He quit on 31 December 2013, and was replaced by Didier Marie.

== Legacy ==
The Football ground for Grand-Quevilly FC was named after him in 2025.
