= Neal Maupay =

French footballer (born 1996)

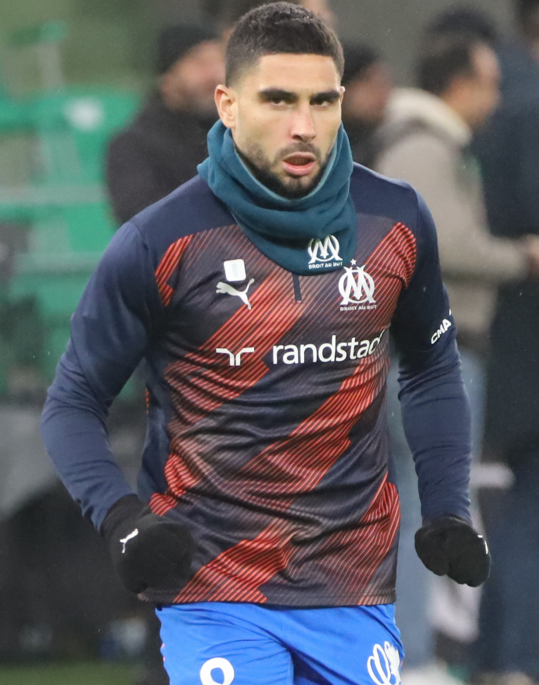
- Maupay warming up for Marseille in 2024

Personal information
- Full name: Neal Maupay
- Date of birth: 14 August 1996 (age 30)
- Place of birth: Versailles, France
- Height: 1.71 m (5 ft 7 in)
- Position: Striker

Team information
- Current team: Marseille
- Number: 11

Youth career
- 2002–2007: US Valbonne
- 2007–2012: Nice

Senior career*
Years	Team	Apps	(Gls)
2012–2014	Nice II	13	(9)
2012–2015	Nice	44	(6)
2015–2017	Saint-Étienne	15	(1)
2015–2017	Saint-Étienne II	6	(2)
2016–2017	→ Brest (loan)	28	(11)
2017–2019	Brentford	85	(37)
2019–2022	Brighton & Hove Albion	102	(26)
2022–2025	Everton	29	(1)
2023–2024	→ Brentford (loan)	29	(6)
2024–2025	→ Marseille (loan)	22	(4)
2025–	Marseille	9	(0)
2026	→ Sevilla (loan)	12	(2)

International career
2011–2012	France U16	13	(6)
2012–2013	France U17	8	(4)
2014–2015	France U19	12	(5)
2014	France U21	2	(1)
- * Club domestic league appearances and goals as of 1 November 2026

Neal Maupay (born 14 August 1996) is a French professional footballer who plays as a striker for Ligue 1 club Marseille.

Maupay started his career with Nice, making his debut for the club professionally in 2012. After stints at Saint-Étienne and Brest (on loan), he moved to English club Brentford in 2017. Two years later, he joined Brighton & Hove Albion, where he made over 100 appearances for the club before joining Everton in 2022. With Everton, he appeared sporadically for the club, and was sent on loan to Brentford and Marseille, signing permanently with the latter in 2025.

Maupay is a former French youth international.

== Club career ==
=== Nice ===
Maupay began his youth career at US Valbonne at age six in 2002, before moving into the Nice academy in 2007. He progressed through the ranks into the reserve team at the beginning of the 2012–13 season, scoring four goals in three early-season matches before receiving his maiden call into the first team squad on 15 September 2012, for a Ligue 1 match versus Brest. At age 16 years and 32 days, Maupay made his professional debut as an injury-time substitute for Éric Bauthéac during the 3–2 win. He was a regular inclusion in the first team squad from October 2012 through to March 2013 and signed a new two-and-a-half-year contract in January 2013. Maupay's season was ended by a torn cruciate ligament suffered during a reserve match on 14 April 2013. Maupay made 19 appearances and scored four goals during the 2012–13 season and when making his Ligue 1 debut and scoring his first Ligue 1 goal, he became the second-youngest player to achieve both feats. His first Ligue 1 goal came in the stoppage time of a 3–2 win over Evian, aged 16 years and 123 days, to be the youngest scorer in the 21st century.

Despite his breakthrough into the first team squad during the 2012–13 season and after recovering from injury, Maupay was out of favour with manager Claude Puel during 2013–14 and 2014–15 seasons, which ultimately caused his departure in August 2015. He made 53 appearances and scored nine goals during three seasons as a first team player at the Allianz Riviera.

=== Saint-Étienne ===
On 10 August 2015, Maupay transferred to Ligue 1 club Saint-Étienne on a four-year contract for a €500,000 fee. Despite making 23 appearances and scoring three goals during the 2015–16 season, he departed on loan for the duration of 2016–17 and left the club in July 2017.

==== Loan to Brest ====
On 20 July 2016, Maupay joined Ligue 2 club Brest on a season-long loan. He had a good start to the 2016–17 season, scoring 10 goals in his opening 21 matches, winning the August 2016 UNFP Ligue 2 Player of the Month award and receiving nominations in September, October and December. Injuries in December 2016 and February 2017 disrupted Maupay's good form and he finished the season with 12 goals in 31 appearances.

=== Brentford ===
On 14 July 2017, Maupay moved to England to join Championship club Brentford on a four-year contract for an undisclosed fee, reported to be £1.6 million. The club's France scout Brendan MacFarlane, who would also go on to identify Saïd Benrahma, Julian Jeanvier and Bryan Mbeumo, played a key role in the identification of the player as a target. He was mainly deployed as a forward and scored three goals in his opening six appearances for the club, with his first goal coming in a 4–3 defeat to Nottingham Forest on 12 August 2017. By mid-December, Maupay was considered the best "super-sub" of 2017–18 Championship season so far, with four of his five league goals having been scored during substitute appearances. He broke into the starting lineup during the protracted transfer of first choice forward Lasse Vibe away from Griffin Park in January 2018 and he assumed the role full time after Vibe's departure early the following month. Maupay showed improved goalscoring form between mid-January and mid-April, with a run of seven goals in 15 matches. He finished the 2017–18 season with 46 appearances and as the club's top-scorer, with 13 goals.

Maupay had an excellent start to the 2018–19 season and scored 13 goals in his first 17 league appearances. Five goals in August 2018 and four in September led to nominations for the August PFA Fans' Championship Player of the Month and the September EFL Championship Player of the Month awards respectively. Maupay won the EFL Player of the Year award at the 2019 London Football Awards, after he scored 18 goals in 30 appearances by the end of January 2019. He finished a mid-table season with 28 goals in 49 appearances and was voted the Brentford's Supporters' and Players' Player of the Year.

=== Brighton & Hove Albion ===
==== 2019–20 season: Debut season ====
On 5 August 2019, Maupay moved to Premier League club Brighton & Hove Albion on undisclosed terms, for a fee reported to be in the region of £20 million on a four-year deal. Maupay scored on his debut in the opening match of the 2019–20 season, Brighton's third in a 3–0 away win over Watford. On 14 September, Maupay opened the scoreline in a 1–1 draw against Burnley, claiming his first home goal for the Sussex club. Maupay scored his 10th goal of the season in a 1–1 away draw against Southampton on 16 July 2020, helping Brighton earn an important point towards safety.

==== 2020–21 season ====
Maupay opened his scoring tally on the second game of the season scoring two inside the first seven minutes in an eventual 3–0 away win over Newcastle United. On 26 September, Manchester United were given a penalty after the final whistle due to VAR deeming Maupay to have committed handball right at the end. Bruno Fernandes converted the penalty with United winning the match 3–2; Maupay also scored a penalty himself earlier on in the game in Panenka style. Maupay was sent off after the full time whistle on 9 May in a 2–1 away loss at Wolverhampton Wanderers for confronting the referee, Jonathan Moss. As a result, Maupay missed the last three games of the season.

==== 2021–22 season ====
Maupay equalised against Burnley on 14 August in the opening game of the 2021–22 season, a 2–1 away win on Maupay's 25th birthday. On 27 September, away at rivals Crystal Palace, Maupay scored an added-time equaliser in a 1–1 draw. After seven games without scoring, Maupay scored his fifth goal of the season on 1 December away at West Ham United, an acrobatic overhead kick in the 89th minute to earn a 1–1 draw. Maupay's opener in the 2–0 away victory over Watford on 12 February 2022 was his 26th Premier League goal for the Albion, equalling Glenn Murray's club record. Maupay's form was in doubt during the latter half of the season with inconsistency and prolonged goal drought. He was dropped for fixtures against Arsenal and Tottenham Hotspur after missing a penalty in the 0–0 home draw against Norwich City on 2 April. Graham Potter defended the Frenchman saying "he's been fantastic", calling Maupay "a fantastic team player" who's been "really professional in training." After being left on the bench for both North London fixtures he returned to the starting line-up on 24 April, playing 85 minutes of the 2–2 home draw against Southampton.

=== Everton ===
Maupay signed for fellow Premier League club Everton on 26 August 2022 on a three-year contract with an option of a further year for an undisclosed fee. He made his debut on 3 September, playing the whole match of the goalless Merseyside derby draw with Liverpool at Goodison Park.

On 9 June 2025, Everton announced that Maupay would be leaving the club upon the conclusion of the 2024–25 season.

==== Loan return to Brentford ====
On 1 September 2023, Brentford announced that they had re-signed Maupay on a season-long loan deal.

He netted his first goal in 14 months on 4 November 2023, as he opened the scoring in a 3–2 home win against West Ham United.

==== Loan to Marseille and Everton controversy ====
On 30 August 2024, Olympique de Marseille confirmed Maupay had signed on a loan deal lasting until the end of the season with an obligation to buy for £6 million, rising to £10 million if certain obligations are met. On 2 January 2025 whilst on loan at Marseille from Everton, Maupay posted on his X (formerly Twitter) account "Whenever I'm having a bad day, I just check the Everton score and smile". This came after Everton were beaten 2–0 by Nottingham Forest. This post caused outrage amongst Everton supporters but the club declined to comment.

== International career ==
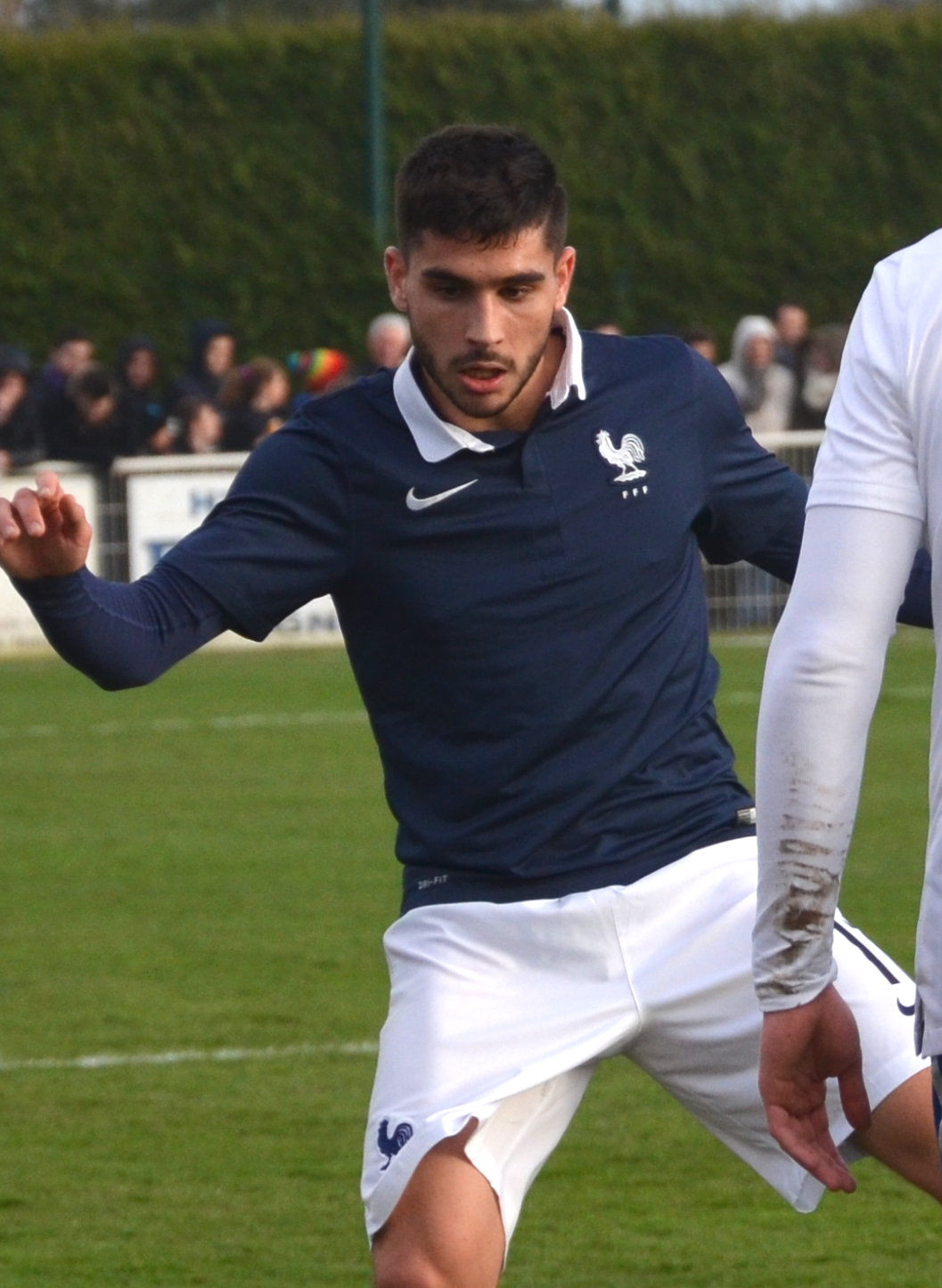
Maupay playing for France U19 in 2015

Maupay won 35 caps and scored 16 goals for France at U16, U17, U19 and U21 level. He was a member of France's 2015 UEFA European U19 Championship squad and made two appearances in the tournament.

He is also eligible to play for the Argentina national team through his mother. In February 2022, Maupay reportedly put in a personal request to Argentina coach Lionel Scaloni to consider selecting him for the national team.

== Style of play ==
Maupay's footballing idol is Zinedine Zidane. He stated that he "can play out wide or as a number 10, but my favoured position is striker. I like to play down the middle and use my pace to get in behind defences" and "I'm used to looking after the ball and holding off defenders".

== Personal life ==
Maupay was born in Versailles and moved to the Côte d'Azur with his family at age five. He is of Argentinian descent on his mother's side and holds both French and Argentinian nationalities since 2013. He has the habit of reading before matches.

In June 2020, Maupay was targeted with death threats after scoring a last-minute winning goal against Arsenal. A joint investigation by the Premier League and authorities in Singapore identified the culprit as 19-year-old Derek Ng, who was given a nine-month probation order. This was the first prosecution outside the UK for abusing a Premier League player.

== Career statistics ==
As of match played 22 October 2026

Appearances and goals by club, season and competition
Club	Season	League			National cup (Note: Includes Coupe de France, FA Cup)		League cup (Note: Includes Coupe de la Ligue, EFL Cup)		Europe		Total	
Club	Season	Division	Apps	Goals	Apps	Goals	Apps	Goals	Apps	Goals	Apps	Goals
Nice II	2012–13	CFA	8	7	—		—		—		8	7
Nice II	2013–14	CFA	4	2	—		—		—		4	2
Nice II	2014–15	CFA	1	0	—		—		—		1	0
Nice II	Total		13	9	—		—		—		13	9
Nice	2012–13	Ligue 1	15	3	2	1	2	0	—		19	4
Nice	2013–14	Ligue 1	16	2	2	1	1	0	0	0	19	3
Nice	2014–15	Ligue 1	13	1	1	0	1	1	—		15	2
Nice	Total		44	6	5	2	4	1	0	0	53	9
Saint-Étienne	2015–16	Ligue 1	15	1	4	2	1	0	3 (Note: Appearances in UEFA Europa League)	0	23	3
Saint-Étienne II	2015–16	CFA	6	2	—		—		—		6	2
Brest (loan)	2016–17	Ligue 2	28	11	1	1	2	0	—		31	12
Brentford	2017–18	Championship	42	12	1	0	3	1	—		46	13
Brentford	2018–19	Championship	43	25	4	3	2	0	—		49	28
Brentford	Total		85	37	5	3	5	1	—		95	41
Brighton & Hove Albion	2019–20	Premier League	37	10	1	0	0	0	—		38	10
Brighton & Hove Albion	2020–21	Premier League	33	8	2	0	1	0	—		36	8
Brighton & Hove Albion	2021–22	Premier League	32	8	2	1	1	0	—		35	9
Brighton & Hove Albion	Total		102	26	5	1	2	0	—		109	27
Everton	2022–23	Premier League	27	1	1	0	1	0	—		29	1
Everton	2023–24	Premier League	2	0	—		1	0	—		3	0
Everton	Total		29	1	1	0	2	0	—		32	1
Brentford (loan)	2023–24	Premier League	29	6	2	2	—		—		31	8
Marseille (loan)	2024–25	Ligue 1	22	4	2	0	—		—		24	4
Marseille	2025–26	Ligue 1	1	0	2	1	—		0	0	3	1
Marseille	2026–27	Ligue 1	6	0	0	0	—		3	0	9	0
Marseille	Marseille total		29	4	4	1	—		3	0	36	5
Sevilla (loan)	2025–26	La Liga	12	2	—		—		—		12	2
Career total			392	105	27	12	16	2	6	0	441	119

== Honours ==
Individual

- UNFP Ligue 2 Player of the Month: August 2016
- London Football Awards EFL Player of the Year: 2018–19
- Brentford Supporters' Player of the Year: 2018–19
- Brentford Players' Player of the Year: 2018–19
