= Grand-Quevilly Football Club =

- Full name: Grand-Quevilly Football Club
- Founded: 1963
- Ground: stade Marc-Massion
- Chairman: Philippe Boimard
- Manager: Romain Colinet
- League: Régional 1
Home colours

Grand-Quevilly Football Club is a French football club based in Le Grand-Quevilly. They are currently playing at the Régional 1 level.

== History ==
The club began life in 1963 and were part of the multi-sports club Amicale Laïque Césaire Levillain. IN 2007 the football section of the club, separated itself from Amicale Laïque Césaire Levillain into its own entity Grand-Quevilly Football Club.

The club played in the regional leagues until the end of the 2018-19 campaign, where upon winning the regional league were promoted to the Championnat National 3. Howevcer they could only survive one season in the National 3 and were relegated back again. The club won promotion two more times since but each time were relegated back to the regional league, where they currently remain.

== Ground ==
The club play their home games at the Stade Marc-Massion.The stadium was originally called the stade du Chêne-à-Leu, but in 2025 it was named after former member of the Senate of France, Marc Massion. The stadium features a stand containing a 300 seater grandstand.

== Honours ==
Ligue Normandie Champions (3) 2018-19, 2021-22, 2023-24

== Notable Players ==
- (France) Mathieu Duhamel
- (France) Pierre Vignaud
- (France) Kévin Gomis
