= Lloyd Palun =

French footballer (born 1988)

Personal information
- Date of birth: 28 November 1988 (age 37)
- Place of birth: Arles, France
- Height: 1.84 m (6 ft 0 in)
- Positions: Right-back; defensive midfielder

Youth career
- 2005–2008: Martigues

Senior career*
Years	Team	Apps	(Gls)
2008–2009	Martigues	11	(0)
2009–2010	Trinité	7	(3)
2010–2015	Nice	62	(1)
2013–2014	Nice B	3	(0)
2015–2017	Red Star	67	(4)
2017–2019	Cercle Brugge	54	(2)
2019–2021	Guingamp	32	(1)
2020	Guingamp II	1	(0)
2021–2023	Bastia	46	(1)
Total		283	(14)

International career
2011–2023	Gabon	78	(1)
- * Club domestic league appearances and goals as of 27 June 2023

Lloyd Palun (born 28 November 1988) is a professional footballer who most recently played for Ligue 2 club Bastia. Born in France, he represents Gabon at international level. He plays as a right-back or as a defensive midfielder.

== Club career ==
Palun joined Nice after playing with local amateur clubs Martigues and Trinité.

== International career ==
Palun holds French and Gabonese nationalities. He elected to represent the Gabon national team at senior international level. He made his debut on 9 February 2011 in a 2–0 victory over Congo DR.

In 2012, he played in all four national team matches at the 2012 Africa Cup of Nations. Gabon reached the quarterfinals.
