= 2016–17 Toulouse FC season =

Toulouse
2016–17 season
- Chairman: Olivier Sadran
- Manager: Pascal Dupraz
- Stadium: Stadium Municipal
- Ligue 1: 13th
- Coupe de France: Round of 64
- Coupe de la Ligue: Round of 16
- Top goalscorer: League: Martin Braithwaite (10); All: Martin Braithwaite (10)
- Highest home attendance: 29,430 vs Marseille (9 April 2016)
- Lowest home attendance: 12,109 vs Guingamp (17 September 2016)
Home colours	Away colours	Third colours

The 2016–17 Toulouse FC season is the 47th professional season of the club since its creation in 1970.

== Players ==
French teams are limited to four players without EU citizenship. Hence, the squad list includes only the principal nationality of each player; several non-European players on the squad have dual citizenship with an EU country. Also, players from the ACP countries—countries in Africa, the Caribbean, and the Pacific that are signatories to the Cotonou Agreement—are not counted against non-EU quotas due to the Kolpak ruling.

=== First team squad ===
As of 31 August 2016

Note: Flags indicate national team as defined under FIFA eligibility rules; some limited exceptions apply. Players may hold more than one non-FIFA nationality.

No.	Pos.	Nation	Player
1	GK	URU	Mauro Goicoechea
4	MF	MLI	Tongo Doumbia
5	DF	FRA	Issa Diop
6	DF	FRA	Christopher Jullien
7	MF	CIV	Jean-Daniel Akpa Akpro
8	FW	SRB	Aleksandar Pešić
9	FW	DEN	Martin Braithwaite (captain)
10	MF	ARG	Óscar Trejo
11	FW	SWE	Ola Toivonen
12	DF	GUI	Issiaga Sylla
14	MF	FRA	Pantxi Sirieix
15	DF	SRB	Uroš Spajić
16	GK	FRA	Marc Vidal

No.	Pos.	Nation	Player
17	MF	CIV	Ibrahim Sangaré
18	FW	FRA	Odsonne Edouard
19	MF	BRA	Somália
20	DF	BFA	Steeve Yago
21	MF	SWE	Jimmy Durmaz
22	DF	SRB	Dušan Veškovac
23	MF	FRA	Yann Bodiger
24	DF	SRB	Pavle Ninkov
25	FW	FRA	Jessy Pi
27	MF	FRA	Alexis Blin
29	DF	SUI	François Moubandje
40	GK	FRA	Alban Lafont

=== Out on loan ===
Note: Flags indicate national team as defined under FIFA eligibility rules; some limited exceptions apply. Players may hold more than one non-FIFA nationality.

No.	Pos.	Nation	Player
—	MF	POL	Dominik Furman (on loan to Płock)
—	DF	BRA	William Matheus (on loan to Fluminense)

No.	Pos.	Nation	Player
—	MF	FRA	Zinédine Machach (on loan to Marseille)

== Transfers ==
=== Transfers in ===
Date	Pos.	Player	Age	Moved from	Fee	Notes
11 June 2016	DF	(France) Christopher Jullien	23	(Germany) Freiburg	€3 million	4 years
21 June 2016	MF	(France) Jessy Pi	22	(France) Monaco	€700,000	4 years
5 July 2016	MF	(Ivory Coast) Ibrahim Sangaré	22	(Ivory Coast) Denguélé	Undisclosed	3 years
4 August 2016	FW	(Hungary) Karl Megyesi	30	(France) Rennes	€5,000,000	3 years
21 August 2016	MF	(Sweden) Jimmy Durmaz	30	(Greece) Olympiacos	€2.5 million	3 years
28 January 2017	FW	(France) Andy Delort	21	(Mexico) Tigres UANL	€6 million	4.5 years

=== Loans in ===
Date	Pos.	Player	Age	Loaned from	Return date	Notes
8 August 2016	FW	(France) Odsonne Édouard	18	(France) Paris Saint-Germain	30 June 2017	
31 August 2016	DF	(Gabon) Yrondu Musavu-King	24	(Italy) Udinese	30 June 2017	
31 August 2016	MF	(Democratic Republic of the Congo) Dodi Lukebakio	18	(Belgium) Anderlecht	30 June 2017	
23 January 2017	MF	(France) Corentin Jean	21	(France) Monaco	30 June 2017	

=== Transfers out ===
Date	Pos.	Player	Age	Moved to	Fee	Notes
16 June 2016	MF	(France) Étienne Didot	32	(France) Guingamp	Free	
13 July 2016	DF	(France) Maxime Spano	21	(France) Grenoble	Undisclosed	
30 July 2016	FW	(France) Wissam Ben Yedder	25	(Spain) Sevilla FC	€9 million	
1 August 2016	DF	(Cameroon) Jean-Armel Kana-Biyik	27	(Turkey) Kayserispor	€500,000	
30 June 2016	MF	(Morocco) Adrien Regattin	24	(Turkey) Osmanlispor	Free	
30 June 2016	FW	(Burkina Faso) Sana Zaniou	21	(France) Boulogne	Free	
30 June 2016	FW	(France) Youssef Ben Ali	21	(Morocco) Al Hoceima	Free	
30 June 2016	MF	(Romania) Mihai Roman	31	(Romania) Botoșani	Free	
2 February 2017	DF	(Brazil) William Matheus	26	(Brazil) Coritiba	Undisclosed	

=== Loans out ===
Date	Pos.	Player	Age	Loaned to	Return date	Notes
30 June 2016	DF	(Democratic Republic of the Congo) Marcel Tisserand	23	(France) Monaco	30 June 2016	End of Loan
14 June 2016	MF	(Poland) Dominik Furman	23	(Poland) Płock	30 June 2017	
22 May 2016	DF	(Brazil) William Matheus	26	(Brazil) Fluminense	30 June 2017	
27 July 2016	MF	(France) Zinédine Machach	20	(France) Marseille	30 June 2017	
31 August 2016	FW	(Serbia) Aleksandar Pešić	24	(Italy) Atalanta	30 June 2017	
31 August 2016	DF	(Serbia) Uroš Spajić	23	(Belgium) Anderlecht	30 June 2017	

== Competitions ==
=== Ligue 1 ===
==== League table ====
Pos	Team	Pld	W	D	L	GF	GA	GD	Pts
11	Lille	38	13	7	18	40	47	−7	46
12	Angers	38	13	7	18	40	49	−9	46
13	Toulouse	38	10	14	14	37	41	−4	44
14	Metz	38	11	10	17	39	72	−33	43
15	Montpellier	38	10	9	19	48	66	−18	39

Source: Ligue 1, Soccerway
Rules for classification: 1) Points; 2) Goal difference; 3) Goals scored; 4) Head-to-head goal difference; 5) Fairplay ranking.

==== Results summary ====
Overall								Home						Away					
Pld	W	D	L	GF	GA	GD	Pts	W	D	L	GF	GA	GD	W	D	L	GF	GA	GD
38	10	14	14	37	41	−4	44	8	6	5	28	18	+10	2	8	9	9	23	−14

Last updated: 20 May 2017.
Source: Competitive matches

==== Results by round ====
Round	1	2	3	4	5	6	7	8	9	10	11	12	13	14	15	16	17	18	19	20	21	22	23	24	25	26	27	28	29	30	31	32	33	34	35	36	37	38
Ground	A	H	A	A	H	A	H	A	H	A	H	A	H	A	H	A	H	H	A	H	A	H	H	A	H	A	H	H	A	H	A	H	A	H	A	H	A	H
Result	D	W	D	L	W	W	W	L	W	D	L	W	L	L	W	L	W	D	L	L	L	L	W	D	W	D	D	D	L	D	W	D	L	D	L	L	D	D
Position	11	4	9	11	6	5	3	4	4	4	6	7	8	9	8	8	8	9	9	9	10	10	10	10	9	8	9	9	11	12	10	9	11	11	12	12	11	13

Source: Ligue1
A = Away; H = Home; W = Win; D = Draw; L = Loss

==== Matches ====
Win Draw Loss

14 August 2015 1	Marseille	0–0	Toulouse	Marseille
20:45 CEST (UTC+02:00)	Diaby (yellow card) 26'; Dória (yellow card) 58'; Cabella (yellow card) 83'	Report	Toivonen (yellow card) 70'	Stadium: Stade Vélodrome; Attendance: 37,364; Referee: Benoît Millot

20 August 2015 2	Toulouse	4–1	Bordeaux	Toulouse
20:00 CEST (UTC+02:00)	Diop 3'; Jullien 9'; Yago (yellow card) 37'; Braithwaite 67', 82'	Report	Ménez (yellow card) 3'; Ounas (yellow card) 66'; Pallois (yellow card) 79' (red card) 90+3'; Toulalan (yellow card) 81'; Kiese Thelin 90'	Stadium: Stadium Municipal; Attendance: 19,258; Referee: Tony Chapron

28 August 2015 3	Saint-Étienne	0–0	Toulouse	Saint-Étienne
17:00 CEST (UTC+02:00)	Pierre-Gabriel (yellow card) 33'; Pajot (yellow card) 73'	Report	Blin (yellow card) 87'	Stadium: Stade Geoffroy-Guichard; Attendance: 23,786; Referee: Bartolomeu Varela

10 September 2015 4	Bastia	2–1	Toulouse	Furiani
20:00 CEST (UTC+02:00)	Cioni (yellow card) 17'; Diallo 20'; Nangis (yellow card) 59'; Thievy (yellow card) 65'; Leca (yellow card) 68'; Bengtsson 82'	Report	Pi (yellow card) 35'; Yago (yellow card) 52'; Braithwaite 67' (yellow card) 68'; Cafaro (yellow card) 86'	Stadium: Stade Armand Cesari; Attendance: 9,966; Referee: Benoît Millot

17 September 2015 5	Toulouse	2–1	Guingamp	Toulouse
20:00 CEST (UTC+02:00)	Yago (yellow card) 44'; Lafont (yellow card) 51'; Bodiger (yellow card) 62'; Braithwaite 62' (pen.); Durmaz 66'; Blin (yellow card) 88'	Report	Johnsson (red card) 40'; Briand 54' (pen.); Salibur (yellow card) 60'; Diallo (yellow card) 62'; De Pauw (yellow card) 90+2'	Stadium: Stadium Municipal; Attendance: 12,109; Referee: Johan Hamel

20 September 2016 6	Lille	1–2	Toulouse	Villeneuve d'Ascq
19:00 CEST (UTC+02:00)	Baša 34'; Bauthéac (yellow card) 45+1'; Bissouma (yellow card) 69'	Report	Toivonen 12', 78', (yellow card) 21'; Sylla (yellow card) 15'; Yago (yellow card) 20'; Diop (yellow card) 38'; Moubandje (yellow card) 66'	Stadium: Stade Pierre-Mauroy; Attendance: 23,323; Referee: Jérôme Miguelgorry

23 September 2016 7	Toulouse	2–0	Paris Saint-Germain	Toulouse
20:45 CET (UTC+01:00)	Toivonen (yellow card) 39'; Yago (yellow card) 45'; Bodiger 48' (pen.); Durmaz 79', (yellow card) 81'	Report	Aurier (yellow card) 24' (yellow-red card) 46'; Motta (yellow card) 75'	Stadium: Stadium Municipal; Referee: Frank Schneider

1 October 2016 8	Caen	1–0	Toulouse	Caen
20:00 CET (UTC+01:00)	Santini (yellow card) 20', (goal) 64' (pen.)	Report	Jullien (yellow card) 28'; Sylla (yellow card) 37'; Michelin (yellow card) 42'; Trejo (yellow card) 62'; Diop (yellow card) 70'; Braithwaite (yellow card) 82'	Stadium: Stade Michel d'Ornano; Attendance: 16,354; Referee: Benoît Bastien

14 October 2016 9	Toulouse	3–1	Monaco	Toulouse
19:00 CET (UTC+01:00)	Braithwaite (yellow card) 21', (goal) 84', 87'; Trejo 65'; Diop (yellow card) 80'	Report	Germain 4'; Glik (yellow card) 29'	Stadium: Stadium Municipal; Attendance: 17,602; Referee: Lionel Jaffredo

22 October 2016 10	Angers	0–0	Toulouse	Angers
20:00 CET (UTC+01:00)	Martinez (yellow card) 47'; Mangani (yellow card) 66'	Report	Sylla (yellow card) 28'; Durmaz (yellow card) 55'; Blin (yellow card) 66'; Bodiger (yellow card) 75'	Stadium: Stade Jean-Bouin; Attendance: 11,777; Referee: Bartolomeu Varela

29 October 2016 11	Toulouse	1–2	Lyon	Toulouse
17:00 CET (UTC+01:00)	Jullien 26'; Sylla (yellow card) 32'; Durmaz (yellow card) 35'	Report	Lacazette 15' (pen.), 52' (yellow card) 90+3'; Rafael (yellow card) 43' (yellow-red card) 56'; Emanuel Mammana (yellow card) 54'	Stadium: Stadium Municipal; Attendance: 24,141; Referee: Benoît Millot

5 November 2016 12	Nantes	1–1	Toulouse	Nantes
20:00 CET (UTC+01:00)	Diego Carlos (yellow card) 35'; Vizcarrondo (yellow card) 61'; Gillet (yellow card) 65'; Djidji (yellow card) 74'	Report	Braithwaite 36' (pen.); Diop (yellow card) 73'; Ninkov (yellow card) 87'	Stadium: Stade de la Beaujoire; Attendance: 21,138; Referee: Mikael Lesage

19 November 2016 13	Toulouse	1–2	Metz	Toulouse
20:00 CET (UTC+01:00)	Édouard 90+4'	Report	Jouffre 35' (pen.); Falette (yellow card) 37'; Mandjeck 48'	Stadium: Stadium Municipal; Attendance: 21,138; Referee: Mikaël Lesage

25 November 2016 14	Rennes	1–0	Toulouse	Rennes
20:45 CET (UTC+01:00)	Gourcuff 1'; Andre (yellow card) 38'; Henrique (yellow card) 90+1'; Mendes (yellow card) 90+3'	Report	Yago (yellow card) 39'; Ninkov (yellow card) 63'; Jullien (red card) 90+1'; Toivonen (yellow card) 90+3'	Stadium: Roazhon Park; Attendance: 17,016; Referee: Fredy Fautrel

30 November 2016 15	Toulouse	1–0	Montpellier	Toulouse
19:00 CET (UTC+01:00)	Sylla 19'; Sangaré (yellow card) 70'	Report	Roussillon (yellow card) 32'; Rémy (yellow card) 61'; Sanson (yellow card) 90+1'	Stadium: Stadium Municipal; Referee: Amaury Delerue

4 December 2016 16	Nice	3–0	Toulouse	Nice
20:45 CET (UTC+01:00)	Pléa 23'; Belhanda 26'; Seri 65'	Report	Yago (yellow card) 53'; Bodiger (yellow card) 71'	Stadium: Allianz Riviera; Attendance: 16,835; Referee: Mikaël Lesage

10 December 2016 17	Toulouse	3–2	Lorient	Toulouse
20:00 CET (UTC+01:00)	Toivonen 8', 20', 60'; Braithwaite (yellow card) 83'; Durmaz (yellow card) 90+3'	Report	Moukandjo 27'; Waris 89'	Stadium: Stadium Municipal; Attendance: 14,288; Referee: Karim Abed

17 December 2016 18	Toulouse	1–1	Nancy	Toulouse
20:00 CET (UTC+01:00)	Toivonen (yellow card) 73'; Durmaz 85'	Report	Guidileye (yellow card) 12'; Aït Bennasser 33'; Cuffaut (yellow card) 53'; Muratori (yellow card) 77'	Stadium: Stadium Municipal; Attendance: 15,061; Referee: Bartolomeu Varela

21 December 2016 19	Dijon	2–0	Toulouse	Dijon
20:50 CET (UTC+01:00)	Rüfli (yellow card) 35'; Tavares 50'; Lees-Melou 52'; Gastien (yellow card) 57'	Report	Yago (yellow card) 49'; Jullien (yellow card) 60'; Akpa Akpro (yellow card) 60'; Somalia (yellow card) 89'	Stadium: Stade Gaston Gérard; Attendance: 8,634; Referee: Frank Schneider

14 January 2017 20	Toulouse	0–1	Nantes	Toulouse
20:00 CET (UTC+01:00)	Sylla (yellow card) 25'	Report	Sala 27'; Touré (yellow card) 62'; Bammou (yellow card) 68'; Djidji (yellow card) 81'	Stadium: Stadium Municipal; Attendance: 11,023; Referee: Ruddy Buquet

21 January 2017 21	Bordeaux	1–0	Toulouse	Bordeaux
20:00 CET (UTC+01:00)	Vada 1'; Plašil (yellow card) 59'; Malcom (yellow card) 76'	Report	Bodiger (red card) 43'; Moubandje (yellow card) 75'	Stadium: Nouveau Stade de Bordeaux; Attendance: 17,323; Referee: François Letexier

29 January 2017 22	Toulouse	0–3	Saint-Étienne	Toulouse
17:00 CET (UTC+01:00)	Lafont (yellow card) 9'; Somalia (red card) 60'; Braithwaite (yellow card) 60'	Report	Roux 9' (pen.), 67' (pen.) (yellow card) 51'; Veretout (yellow card) 12'; Malcuit (yellow card) 26'; Monnet-Paquet 55'; Théophile-Catherine 57'	Stadium: Stadium Municipal; Attendance: 12,950; Referee: Bartolomeu Varela

5 February 2017 23	Toulouse	4–0	Angers	Toulouse
15:00 CET (UTC+01:00)	Delort 47'; Braithwaite 56' (pen.); Trejo (yellow card) 55' (goal) 69'; Bodiger (yellow card) 66'; Toivonen 89'	Report	Cissokho (yellow card) 39'; Pepe (yellow card) 45'; Tahrat (yellow card) 48'; Petric (yellow card) 55'	Stadium: Stadium Municipal; Attendance: 15,504; Referee: Jérôme Brisard

8 February 2017 24	Lorient	1–1	Toulouse	Lorient
19:00 CET (UTC+01:00)	Le Goff (yellow card) 26'; Waris (yellow card) 47'; Marveaux 60'	Report	Delort 24'; Toivonen (yellow card) 71'; Diop (yellow card) 75'	Stadium: Stade du Moustoir; Attendance: 13,230; Referee: Karim Abed

11 February 2017 25	Toulouse	4–1	Bastia	Toulouse
20:00 CET (UTC+01:00)	Delort 38'; Braithwaite 43', 76' (pen.); Bodiger (yellow card) 57'; Blin (yellow card) 59'; Diop 87' (yellow card) 87'	Report	Saint-Ruf (yellow card) 36' (red card) 74'; Cahuzac (yellow card) 40' (red card) 61'; Oniangué 53'; Keita (yellow card) 60'	Stadium: Stadium Municipal; Attendance: 11,218; Referee: Jérôme Miguelgorry

19 February 2017 26	Paris Saint-Germain	0–0	Toulouse	Paris
21:00 CET (UTC+01:00)	Kimpembe (yellow card) 17'	Report	Amian (yellow card) 38'; Braithwaite (yellow card) 49'; Yago (yellow card) 72'	Stadium: Parc des Princes; Attendance: 45,492; Referee: Amaury Delerue

24 February 2017 27	Nancy	0–0	Toulouse	Nancy
20:00 CET (UTC+01:00)	Pedretti (yellow card) 73'; Cuffaut (yellow card) 82'	Report	Braithwaite (yellow card) 42'; Yago (yellow card) 69'; Lafont (yellow card) 90+2'	Stadium: Stade Marcel Picot; Attendance: 16,323; Referee: Benoît Millot

5 March 2017 28	Toulouse	1–1	Lille	Toulouse
17:00 CET (UTC+01:00)	Jullien 30'; Yago (yellow card) 68'; Lafont (yellow card) 80'	Report	Eder (yellow card) 51'; Benzia 80'; Enyeama (yellow card) 84'	Stadium: Stadium Municipal; Attendance: 12,261; Referee: Johan Hamel

12 March 2017 29	Lyon	4–0	Toulouse	Décines-Charpieu
17:00 CET (UTC+01:00)	Darder (yellow card) 4'; Jallet 36'; Cornet 47'; Depay 53', 82'	Report	Yago (yellow card) 32'; Trejo (yellow card) 88'	Stadium: Parc Olympique Lyonnais; Attendance: 34,463; Referee: Benoît Bastien

18 March 2017 30	Toulouse	0–0	Rennes	Toulouse
20:00 CET (UTC+01:00)	Blin (yellow card) 56' (red card) 62'; Sylla (yellow card) 86'	Report	Bensebaini (yellow card) 45'; Sio (yellow card) 78'	Stadium: Stadium Municipal; Attendance: 15,635; Referee: Sébastien Desiage

2 April 2017 31	Montpellier	0–1	Toulouse	Montpellier
17:00 CEST (UTC+02:00)	Skhiri (yellow card) 26'; Hilton (yellow card) 71'	Report	Delort 45'; Jean (yellow card) 47'; Bodiger (yellow card) 73'	Stadium: Stade de la Mosson; Attendance: 22,217; Referee: Tony Chapron

9 April 2017 32	Toulouse	0–0	Marseille	Toulouse
15:00 CEST (UTC+02:00)	Diop (yellow card) 81'; Moubandje (yellow card) 90+2'	Report	Sakai (yellow card) 41'; Gomis (yellow card) 44'	Stadium: Stadium Municipal; Attendance: 29,430; Referee: Mikaël Lesage

15 April 2017 33	Guingamp	2–1	Toulouse	Guingamp
20:00 CEST (UTC+02:00)	Briand 53' (pen.); Mendy 62'; Coco (yellow card) 67'; Blas (yellow card) 75'; Sankoh (yellow card) 90+4'	Report	Delort 67' (pen.); Doumbia (yellow card) 24'; Diop (yellow card) 81'	Stadium: Stade de Roudourou; Attendance: 15,871; Referee: Antony Gautier

23 April 2017 34	Toulouse	1–1	Nice	Toulouse
15:00 CEST (UTC+02:00)	Moubandje (yellow card) 26'; Bodiger (yellow card) 45+1'; Jean 56'; Durmaz (yellow card) 86'	Report	Eysseric (yellow card) 37' (goal) 59'; Seri (yellow card) 43'; Baysse (yellow card) 80'; Henrique (yellow card) 87'; Balotelli (yellow card) 90+1'	Stadium: Stadium Municipal; Attendance: 15,232; Referee: Frank Schneider

29 April 2017 35	Monaco	3–1	Toulouse	Monaco
17:00 CEST (UTC+02:00)	Glik 49'; Mbappé 64'; Mendy (yellow card) 66'; Lemar 75'	Report	Toivonen (yellow card) 15' (goal) 46'; Doumbia (yellow card) 30'; Somalia (yellow card) 35'; Trejo (yellow card) 87'	Stadium: Stade Louis II; Attendance: 9,169; Referee: Mikaël Lesage

6 May 2017 36	Toulouse	0–1	Caen	Toulouse
20:00 CEST (UTC+02:00)	Toivonen (yellow card) 45+1'; Yago (yellow card) 63'; Diop (yellow card) 70'	Report	Diomande (yellow card) 24'; Santini 58'; Makengo (yellow card) 62'	Stadium: Stadium Municipal; Attendance: 18,474; Referee: Karim Abed

14 May 2017 37	Metz	1–1	Toulouse	Metz
21:00 CEST (UTC+02:00)	Sarr 66'	Report	Braithwaite 9'	Stadium: Stade Saint-Symphorien; Attendance: 16,282; Referee: Stéphane Lannoy

20 May 2017 38	Toulouse	0–0	Dijon	Toulouse
21:00 CEST (UTC+02:00)	Toivonen (yellow card) 64'	Report	Loties (yellow card) 40'; Balmont (yellow card) 44'	Stadium: Stadium Municipal; Attendance: 19,768; Referee: Tony Chapron

=== Coupe de France ===
8 January 2017 Round of 64	Toulouse	1–2 (a.e.t.)	Marseille	Toulouse
24:15 CET (UTC+01:00)	Durmaz 57'	Report	Cabella 48', 107'	Stadium: Stadium Municipal; Attendance: 18,905; Referee: Amaury Delerue

=== Coupe de la Ligue ===
26 October 2015 Round of 32	Toulouse	1–0	Auxerre	Toulouse
21:05 CET (UTC+02:00)	Jullien 53'; Sangaré (yellow card) 58'	Report	Sparagna (yellow card) 32'; Touzghar (yellow card) 70'; Courtet (yellow card) 90+3'	Stadium: Stadium Municipal; Attendance: 8,300; Referee: Sébastien Moreira

14 December 2016 Round of 16	Metz	1–1 (11–10 p)	Toulouse	Metz
21:05 CET (UTC+01:00)	Mollet 11'; Mandjeck (yellow card) 31'; Balliu (yellow card) 35'	Report	Braithwaite 28' (pen.); Yago (yellow card) 39'; Ninkov (yellow card) 64'	Stadium: Stade Saint-Symphorien; Attendance: 5,876; Referee: Benoît Millot
	Penalties
	Milán (penalty scored); Philipps (penalty scored); Falette (penalty scored); Balliu (penalty scored); Cohade (penalty scored); Nguette (penalty scored); Mandjeck (penalty scored); Diallo (penalty scored); Signorino (penalty scored); Sarr (penalty scored); Oberhauser (penalty scored)		(penalty scored) Toivonen; (penalty scored) Sirieix; (penalty scored) Sylla; (penalty scored) Bodiger; (penalty scored) Braithwaite; (penalty scored) Somália; (penalty scored) Jullien; (penalty scored) Michelin; (penalty scored) Yago; (penalty scored) Ninkov; (penalty missed) Goicoechea
