= 2015–16 Toulouse FC season =

Toulouse
2015–16 season
- Chairman: Olivier Sadran
- Manager: Dominique Arribagé (Until 27 February); Pascal Dupraz (From 2 March)
- Stadium: Stadium Municipal
- Ligue 1: 17th
- Coupe de France: Round of 32
- Coupe de la Ligue: Semi-final
- Top goalscorer: League: Wissam Ben Yedder (17); All: Wissam Ben Yedder (23)
- Highest home attendance: 30,178 vs Paris Saint-Germain (16 January 2016)
- Lowest home attendance: 6,298 vs Auxerre (28 October 2015)
Home colours	Away colours	Third colours

The 2015–16 Toulouse FC season is the 46th professional season of the club since its creation in 1970.

== Players ==
French teams are limited to four players without EU citizenship. Hence, the squad list includes only the principal nationality of each player; several non-European players on the squad have dual citizenship with an EU country. Also, players from the ACP countries—countries in Africa, the Caribbean, and the Pacific that are signatories to the Cotonou Agreement—are not counted against non-EU quotas due to the Kolpak ruling.

=== First team squad ===
As of 2 February 2016

Note: Flags indicate national team as defined under FIFA eligibility rules; some limited exceptions apply. Players may hold more than one non-FIFA nationality.

No.	Pos.	Nation	Player
1	GK	URU	Mauro Goicoechea
2	DF	FRA	Maxime Spano
3	DF	CMR	Jean-Armel Kana-Biyik
4	MF	MLI	Tongo Doumbia
5	DF	FRA	Issa Diop
6	DF	BRA	William Matheus
7	MF	CIV	Jean-Daniel Akpa Akpro (captain)
8	MF	FRA	Étienne Didot
9	FW	DEN	Martin Braithwaite
10	FW	FRA	Wissam Ben Yedder
11	FW	SRB	Aleksandar Pešić
12	FW	FRA	Youssef Benali
13	MF	FRA	Zinédine Machach
14	MF	FRA	Pantxi Sirieix

No.	Pos.	Nation	Player
15	DF	SRB	Uroš Spajić
16	GK	FRA	Marc Vidal
17	MF	MAR	Adrien Regattin
18	MF	ARG	Óscar Trejo
19	MF	BRA	Somália
20	DF	BFA	Steeve Yago
23	MF	FRA	Yann Bodiger
24	DF	SRB	Pavle Ninkov
25	FW	FRA	Sana Zaniou
26	DF	FRA	Marcel Tisserand (on loan from Monaco)
27	MF	FRA	Alexis Blin
28	MF	ROU	Mihai Roman
29	DF	SUI	François Moubandje
40	GK	FRA	Alban Lafont

=== Out on loan ===
Note: Flags indicate national team as defined under FIFA eligibility rules; some limited exceptions apply. Players may hold more than one non-FIFA nationality.

No.	Pos.	Nation	Player
—	DF	GUI	Issiaga Sylla (on loan to Gazélec Ajaccio)
—	DF	SRB	Dušan Veškovac (on loan to Troyes)

No.	Pos.	Nation	Player
—	MF	POL	Dominik Furman (on loan to Hellas Verona)
—	MF	COL	Abel Aguilar (on loan to Belenenses)

== Transfers ==
=== Transfers in ===
Date	Pos.	Player	Age	Moved from	Fee	Notes
1 July 2015	GK	(Uruguay) Mauro Goicoechea	27	(Portugal) Arouca	Undisclosed	
7 August 2015	MF	(Brazil) Somália	26	(Hungary) Ferencváros	Undisclosed	

=== Loans in ===
Date	Pos.	Player	Age	Loaned from	Return date	Notes
21 July 2015	DF	(Democratic Republic of the Congo) Marcel Tisserand	22	(France) Monaco	30 June 2016	

=== Transfers out ===
Date	Pos.	Player	Age	Moved to	Fee	Notes
1 July 2015	DF	(Ivory Coast) Serge Aurier	22	(France) Paris Saint-Germain	£7 million	
1 July 2015	GK	(France) Zacharie Boucher	23	(France) Auxerre	Undisclosed	
1 July 2015	GK	(France) Lionel Mpasi	20	Unattached	Released	
1 July 2015	FW	(France) Amadou Soukouna	23	Unattached	Released	
21 January 2016	DF	(Romania) Dragoș Grigore	29	(Qatar) Al-Sailiya SC	Undisclosed	
26 January 2016	GK	(France) Ali Ahamada	24	(Turkey) Kayserispor	Undisclosed	
2 February 2016	MF	(Colombia) Abel Aguilar	31	(Portugal) Belenenses	Undisclosed	

=== Loans out ===
Date	Pos.	Player	Age	Loaned to	Return date	Notes
1 July 2015	DF	(Romania) Dragoș Grigore	28	(Qatar) Al-Sailiya SC	30 June 2016	
4 July 2015	DF	(Guinea) Issiaga Sylla	21	(France) Gazélec Ajaccio	30 June 2016	
31 August 2015	DF	(Serbia) Dušan Veškovac	29	(France) Troyes	30 June 2016	
1 February 2016	MF	(Poland) Dominik Furman	23	(Italy) Hellas Verona	30 June 2016	

== Competitions ==
=== Ligue 1 ===
==== League table ====
Pos	Team	Pld	W	D	L	GF	GA	GD	Pts	Qualification or relegation
15	Lorient	38	11	13	14	47	58	−11	46	
16	Guingamp	38	11	11	16	47	56	−9	44	
17	Toulouse	38	9	13	16	45	55	−10	40	
18	Reims (R)	38	10	9	19	44	57	−13	39	Relegation to Ligue 2 (Note: Starting this season, Ligue 1 decided to reduce the number of relegation spots from three to two. However, the decision was appealed and overturned so three teams were relegated.)
19	Gazélec Ajaccio (R)	38	8	13	17	37	58	−21	37	Relegation to Ligue 2

Source: Ligue 1, Soccerway
Rules for classification: 1) Points; 2) Goal difference; 3) Goals scored; 4) Head-to-head points; 5) Head-to-head goal difference; 6) Fairplay ranking.
(R) Relegated

==== Results summary ====
Overall								Home						Away					
Pld	W	D	L	GF	GA	GD	Pts	W	D	L	GF	GA	GD	W	D	L	GF	GA	GD
38	9	13	16	45	55	−10	40	6	7	6	29	21	+8	3	6	10	16	34	−18

Last updated: 14 May 2016.
Source: Competitive matches

==== Results by round ====
Round	1	2	3	4	5	6	7	8	9	10	11	12	13	14	15	16	17	18	19	20	21	22	23	24	25	26	27	28	29	30	31	32	33	34	35	36	37	38
Ground	H	A	H	A	H	A	H	A	A	H	A	H	A	A	H	A	H	A	H	A	H	A	H	A	H	A	H	H	A	H	A	H	H	A	H	A	H	A
Result	W	L	D	L	D	D	D	L	D	L	L	D	L	L	W	W	L	D	D	W	L	L	L	L	D	L	D	L	D	W	L	W	W	D	L	D	W	W
Position	5	10	11	14	16	17	15	17	17	17	18	19	19	19	19	19	19	19	19	18	19	19	19	19	19	19	19	19	19	19	19	19	19	19	19	19	17	17

Source: Ligue1
A = Away; H = Home; W = Win; D = Draw; L = Loss

==== Matches ====
Win Draw Loss

9 August 2015 1	Toulouse	2–1	Saint-Étienne	Toulouse
17:00 CEST (UTC+02:00)	Braithwaite 26'; Ben Yedder 53'; Pešić (red card) 87'	Report	Perrin 17'; Théophile-Catherine (yellow card) 66'	Stadium: Stadium Municipal; Attendance: 15,158; Referee: Bartolomeu Varela

15 August 2015 2	Caen	1–0	Toulouse	Caen
21:00 CEST (UTC+02:00)	Adeoti (yellow card) 45+1'; Da Silva 69'	Report	Didot (yellow card) 69'; Ben Yedder (yellow card) 78'; Doumbia (yellow card) 89'; Spajić (red card) 90'	Stadium: Stade Michel d'Ornano; Attendance: 16,791; Referee: Stéphane Jochem

22 August 2015 3	Toulouse	1–1	Monaco	Toulouse
20:00 CEST (UTC+2)	Doumbia 22'	Report	Wallace (yellow card) 50'; Touré (yellow card) 57'; Lemar 65'; Traoré (yellow card) 80'; Silva (yellow card) 87'	Stadium: Stadium Municipal; Attendance: 12,748; Referee: Stephane Lannoy

29 August 2015 4	Rennes	3–1	Toulouse	Rennes
20:00 CEST (UTC+02:00)	Yago 17' (o.g.); Fernandes (yellow card) 55'; Armand 68'; Henrique (yellow card) 75'; Sio 90'	Report	Braithwaite 5'; Akpa Akpro (yellow card) 55'; Tisserand (yellow card) 65'; Goicoechea (yellow card) 67'	Stadium: Roazhon Park; Attendance: 18,560; Referee: Benoît Millot

12 September 2015 5	Toulouse	2–2	Reims	Toulouse
20:00 CEST (UTC+02:00)	Trejo (yellow card) 20'; Kana-Biyik 28'; Braithwaite 30'; Akpa Akpro (yellow card) 71'	Report	Siebatcheu 56'; Oniangue (yellow card) 68'; Bulot 80'; Devaux (yellow card) 90+4'	Stadium: Stadium Municipal; Attendance: 11,766; Referee: Fredy Fautrel

20 September 2015 6	Bordeaux	1–1	Toulouse	Bordeaux
14:00 CEST (UTC+02:00)	Pallois (yellow card) 18'; Biyogo Poko (yellow card) 56'; Crivelli 89'	Report	Regattin 23', (yellow card) 57'; Bodiger (yellow card) 45+1'; Trejo (red card) 77'	Stadium: Nouveau Stade de Bordeaux; Attendance: 20,650; Referee: Mikaël Lesage

23 September 2015 7	Toulouse	1–1	Marseille	Toulouse
21:00 CEST (UTC+02:00)	Moubandje (yellow card) 35' (yellow-red card) 84'; Braithwaite 67'; Doumbia (yellow card) 85'; Akpa Akpro (yellow card) 87'; Yago (red card) 87'	Report	Mendy (red card) 78'; Batshuayi 90'	Stadium: Stadium Municipal; Attendance: 18,350; Referee: Antony Gautier

26 September 2015 8	Bastia	3–0	Toulouse	Furiani
20:00 CEST (UTC+02:00)	Cahuzac (yellow card) 2'; Palmieri 8'; Squillaci 31', 43'; Mostefa (yellow card) 38'; Marange (yellow card) 86'	Report	Regattin (yellow card) 2'; Spajić (yellow card) 49'; Blin (yellow card) 59'	Stadium: Stade Armand Cesari; Attendance: 10,658; Referee: Hakim Ben El Hadj

3 October 2015 9	Gazélec Ajaccio	2–2	Toulouse	Ajaccio, Corsica
20:00 CEST (UTC+02:00)	Filippi (yellow card) 16'; Mayi 25'; Pujol (yellow card) 41', (goal) 44'; Ducourtioux (yellow card) 66'	Report	Braithwaite 21'; Bodiger (yellow card) 47'; Sylla 49' (o.g.)	Stadium: Stade Ange Casanova; Attendance: 3,465; Referee: Frank Schneider

17 October 2015 10	Toulouse	1–2	Angers	Toulouse
20:00 CEST (UTC+02:00)	Trejo 24'; Tisserand (yellow card) 84'	Report	Ndoye 27'; Camara 34'; Sissoko (yellow card) 83'	Stadium: Stadium Municipal; Attendance: 13,887; Referee: Amaury Delerue

23 October 2015 11	Lyon	3–0	Toulouse	Lyon
20:30 CEST (UTC+02:00)	Darder 18'; Morel (yellow card) 51'; Valbuena 69'; Cornet 90+4'	Report	Moubandje (yellow card) 29'; Bodiger (yellow card) 31'; Akpa Akpro (yellow card) 44'; Trejo (yellow card) 50'	Stadium: Stade de Gerland; Attendance: 32,327; Referee: Nicolas Rainville

31 October 2015 12	Toulouse	1–1	Montpellier	Toulouse
20:00 CET (UTC+01:00)	Akpa Akpro (yellow card) 25'; Machach (yellow card) 35', (goal) 39'; Regattin (yellow card) 85'; Bodiger (yellow card) 89'	Report	Roussillon 34'; Casimir Ninga (yellow card) 58'; Bensebaini (yellow card) 90+3'	Stadium: Stadium Municipal; Attendance: 8,883; Referee: Stéphane Lannoy

7 November 2015 13	Paris Saint-Germain	5–0	Toulouse	Paris
17:00 CET (UTC+01:00)	Di María 6'; Ibrahimović 18', 45'; Lucas 66'; Lavezzi 79'; David Luiz (yellow card) 88'; Stambouli (yellow card) 90'	Report	Tisserand (yellow card) 34'	Stadium: Parc des Princes; Attendance: 47,381; Referee: Johan Hamel

21 November 2015 14	Guingamp	2–0	Toulouse	Guingamp
20:00 CET (UTC+01:00)	Diallo (yellow card) 27'; Privat (yellow card) 32', (goal) 59'; Salibur 70'; Lévêque (yellow card) 73'	Report	Machach (yellow card) 24'; Matheus (yellow card) 38'; Bodiger (yellow card) 41'; Kana-Biyik (red card) 83'	Stadium: Stade du Roudourou; Attendance: 12,737; Referee: Wilfried Bien

28 November 2015 15	Toulouse	2–0	Nice	Toulouse
20:00 CE1T (UTC+01:00)	Somália (yellow card) 15'; Braithwaite 31' (pen.); Ben Yedder 58'; Machach (yellow card) 60'	Report	Hassen (red card) 39'; Pied (yellow card) 60'; Le Marchand (yellow card) 90+2'	Stadium: Stadium Municipal; Attendance: 9,956; Referee: Saïd Ennjimi

2 December 2015 16	Troyes	0–3	Toulouse	Troyes
19:00 CET (UTC+01:00)	Darbion (red card) 79'	Report	Diop 2'; Tisserand (yellow card) 31' (yellow-red card) 66'; Akpa Akpro 49', (yellow card) 82'; Pešić 86'	Stadium: Stade de l'Aube; Attendance: 10,183; Referee: Sébastien Moreira

5 December 2015 17	Toulouse	2–3	Lorient	Toulouse
20:00 CET (UTC+01:00)	Bodiger (yellow card) 20'; Kana-Biyik 41'; Ben Yedder 59'	Report	Jeannot (yellow card) 27', (goal) 47', 48'; Bellugou (yellow card) 46'; Mesloub 76'	Stadium: Stadium Municipal; Attendance: 14,354; Referee: Stéphane Jochem

12 December 2015 18	Nantes	1–1	Toulouse	Nantes
20:00 CET (UTC+01:00)	Deaux (yellow card) 35'; Audel (yellow card) 53'; Sala (yellow card) 85', (goal) 86'; Henry (yellow card) 90+1'	Report	Doumbia (yellow card) 26'; Pešić 53'; Ben Yedder (yellow card) 57'; Matheus (yellow card) 83'; Bodiger (yellow card) 87'; Diop (red card) 90+1'	Stadium: Stade de la Beaujoire; Attendance: 18,851; Referee: Hakim Ben El Hadj

19 December 2015 19	Toulouse	1–1	Lille	Toulouse
20:00 CET (UTC+01:00)	Ben Yedder 12'; Machach (yellow card) 43'; Akpa Akpro (yellow card) 60'; Doumbia (red card) 68'	Report	Obbadi (yellow card) 45+2'; Boufal 87'	Stadium: Stadium Municipal; Attendance: 14,843; Referee: Ruddy Buquet

9 January 2016 20	Reims	1–3	Toulouse	Reims
20:00 CET (UTC+01:00)	Devaux 12', (red card) 79'; Mandi (yellow card) 27'; Traoré (yellow card) 46'	Report	Akpa Akpro (yellow card) 29'; Blin (yellow card) 40'; Tisserand (yellow card) 44'; Ben Yedder 51', 66', 89'; Trejo (yellow card) 59'	Stadium: Stade Auguste Delaune; Attendance: 13,192; Referee: Mikaël Lesage

16 January 2016 21	Toulouse	0–1	Paris Saint-Germain	Toulouse
17:00 CET (UTC+01:00)	Akpa Akpro (yellow card) 72'	Report	Ibrahimović 73'	Stadium: Stadium Municipal; Attendance: 30,178; Referee: Bartolomeu Varela

24 January 2016 22	Monaco	4–0	Toulouse	Fontvieille
14:00 CET (UTC+01:00)	Bakayoko (yellow card) 24'; Silva 28', (yellow card) 40'; Coentrão 36'; Carvalho (yellow card) 39'; Carrillo 70'; Costa 90+2'	Report	Somália (yellow card) 35'	Stadium: Stade Louis II; Attendance: 5,628; Referee: Hakim Ben El Hadj

30 January 2016 23	Toulouse	1–2	Guingamp	Toulouse
20:00 CET (UTC+01:00)	Akpa Akpro (yellow card) 37'; Ben Yedder 64' (pen.); Diop (yellow card) 47' (yellow-red card) 90+2'	Report	Younousse Sankharé 12' (yellow card) 88'; Giresse (yellow card) 29'; Briand 72'; Kerbrat (yellow card) 79'; Mathis (yellow card) 90'	Stadium: Stade Municipal; Attendance: 20,097; Referee: Sébastien Moreira

3 February 2016 24	Nice	1–0	Toulouse	Nice
19:00 CET (UTC+01:00)	Pied (yellow card) 70'; Ben Arfa 82'	Report	Blin (yellow card) 71'	Stadium: Allianz Riviera; Attendance: 12,828; Referee: François Letexier

6 February 2016 25	Toulouse	0–0	Nantes	Toulouse
20:00 CET (UTC+01:00)	Trejo (yellow card) 36'; Moubandje (yellow card) 90'	Report	Sabaly (yellow card) 16'; Thomasson (yellow card) 37'; Sala (yellow card) 86'; Bammou (yellow card) 90'	Stadium: Stadium Municipal; Attendance: 11,570; Referee: Lionel Jaffredo

13 February 2016 26	Montpellier	2–0	Toulouse	Montpellier
20:00 CET (UTC+01:00)	Yatabaré 24'; Camara 88'	Report	Regattin (yellow card) 21'; Moubandje (yellow card) 82'	Stadium: Stade de la Mosson; Attendance: 14,616; Referee: Saïd Ennjimi

20 February 2016 27	Toulouse	1–1	Gazélec Ajaccio	Toulouse
20:00 CET (UTC+01:00)	Blin (yellow card) 82'; Braithwaite 90+1'	Report	Filippi (yellow card) 39'; Sylla (yellow card) 36' (yellow-red card) 79'; Ducourtioux (yellow card) 49'; Mayi 59'; Touré (yellow card) 87'	Stadium: Stade Municipal; Attendance: 19,173; Referee: Fredy Fautrel

27 February 2016 28	Toulouse	1–2	Rennes	Toulouse
20:00 CET (UTC+01:00)	Bodiger (yellow card) 57'; Akpa Akpro (yellow card) 74'; Ben Yedder 78'	Report	Dembélé 80'; Grosicki 90+2'	Stadium: Stade Municipal; Attendance: 11,627; Referee: Stéphane Jochem

6 March 2016 29	Marseille	1–1	Toulouse	Marseille
14:00 CET (UTC+01:00)	Rekik (yellow card) 28'; Rolando (yellow card) 59'; Somália 74' (o.g.)	Report	Blin (yellow card) 36'; Ben Yedder 55'	Stadium: Stade Vélodrome; Attendance: 41,080; Referee: Benoît Millot

12 March 2016 30	Toulouse	4–0	Bordeaux	Toulouse
20:00 CET (UTC+01:00)	Ben Yedder 5', 50' (pen.); Braithwaite (yellow card) 51', (goal) 86' (pen.); Diop (yellow card) 81'; Tisserand (yellow card) 90'; Trejo 90'	Report	Chantôme (yellow card) 25'; Sané (red card) 49'; Biyogo Poko (yellow card) 51'; Ounas (yellow card) 62'	Stadium: Stadium Municipal; Attendance: 12,292; Referee: Stéphane Lannoy

19 March 2016 31	Lille	1–0	Toulouse	Villeneuve-d'Ascq
20:00 CET (UTC+1)	Amalfitano 17'; Éder (yellow card) 40'; Civelli (yellow card) 43'; Boufal (yellow card) 90+3'	Report	Diop (yellow card) 54'; Doumbia (yellow card) 57'; Yago (yellow card) 68'	Stadium: Stade Pierre-Mauroy; Attendance: 29,736; Referee: Bartolomeu Varela

2 April 2016 32	Toulouse	2–0	Caen	Toulouse
20:00 CET (UTC+2)	Rodelin 30' (o.g.); Diop (yellow card) 47'; Braithwaite 84'	Report	Seube (yellow card) 74'	Stadium: Stadium Municipal; Attendance: 14,002; Referee: François Letexier

9 April 2016 33	Toulouse	4–0	Bastia	Toulouse
20:00 CET (UTC+2)	Ben Yedder 57', 80'; Braithwaite 62'; Doumbia (yellow card) 67'; Trejo 70'	Report	Cahuzac (red card) 67'	Stadium: Stadium Municipal; Attendance: 17,407; Referee: Ruddy Buquet

16 April 2016 34	Lorient	1–1	Toulouse	Lorient
20:00 CET (UTC+2)	Abdullah (yellow card) 78'; Toure 90+1'	Report	Ben Yedder 49'; Trejo (yellow card) 74'; Moubandje (yellow card) 77'	Stadium: Stade du Moustoir; Attendance: 13,212; Referee: Stéphane Lannoy

23 April 2016 35	Toulouse	2–3	Lyon	Toulouse
17:30 CET (UTC+1)	Regattin (yellow card) 34'; Tisserand 50'; Ben Yedder 82'; Sirieix (yellow card) 83'	Report	Valbuena (yellow card) 13'; Grenier 73'; Lacazette 80'; Lopes (yellow card) 83'; Toliso 85', (yellow card) 90+4'	Stadium: Stadium Municipal; Attendance: 24,316; Referee: Clément Turpin

30 April 2016 36	Saint-Étienne	0–0	Toulouse	Saint-Étienne
17:00 CET (UTC+02:00)	Sall (yellow card) 23'; Clément (yellow card) 29'; Perrin (red card) 77'	Report	Diop (yellow card) 43'; Yago (yellow card) 45+1'	Stadium: Stade Geoffroy-Guichard; Attendance: 30,578; Referee: Lionel Jaffredo

7 May 2016 37	Toulouse	1–0	Troyes	Toulouse
21:00 CET (UTC+2)	Trejo 53' (yellow card) 86'; Akpa Akpro (yellow card) 86'	Report	Azamoum (yellow card) 18'; Saunier (yellow card) 50'; Ben Saada (yellow card) 88'	Stadium: Stadium Municipal; Attendance: 29,444; Referee: Anthony Gautier

14 May 2016 38	Angers	2–3	Toulouse	Angers
21:00 CET (UTC+02:00)	Bouka Moutou (yellow card) 2'; Ketkeophomphone 12'; Benrahma 63'; Bourillon (yellow card) 69'; Yattara (yellow card) 75'; Saïss (yellow card) 79'	Report	Ben Yedder 59'; Yago (yellow card) 74'; Braithwaite 78'; Bodiger 80'	Stadium: Stade Jean-Bouin; Attendance: 15,131; Referee: Stéphane Moulin

=== Coupe de France ===
2 January 2016 Round of 64	L'Entente SSG	0–5	Toulouse	Sannois
18:00 CET (UTC+01:00)	Kouang (red card) 16'	Report	Ben Yedder 18'; Moubandje (yellow card) 22'; Trejo 32'; Braithwaite 37', 56'; Somália 54'	Stadium: Parc des Sports Michel Hidalgo; Attendance: 3,353; Referee: François Letexier

19 January 2016 Round of 32	Paris Saint-Germain	2–1	Toulouse	Paris
21:00 CET (UTC+01:00)	David Luiz 54' (yellow card) 73'; Di María (yellow card) 59'; Ibrahimović 89' (pen.)	Report	Moubandje 11'; Ninkov (yellow card) 64'; Regattin (yellow card) 89'	Stadium: Parc des Princes; Attendance: 35,000; Referee: Tony Chapron

=== Coupe de la Ligue ===
28 October 2015 Round of 32	Toulouse	3–3 (a.e.t.) (2–1 p)	Auxerre	Toulouse
21:00 CET (UTC+01:00)	Ben Yedder 73', 88'; Ninkov (yellow card) 81'; Matheus (yellow card) 89'; Bodiger 114'	Report	Kılıç 32'; Konaté (yellow card) 70' (yellow-red card) 83'; Sefil 82', (yellow card) 89'; Courtet 103'	Stadium: Stadium Municipal; Attendance: 6,298; Referee: Aurélien Petit
	Penalties
	Ben Yedder (penalty scored); Regattin (penalty missed); Braithwaite (penalty scored); Spajić (penalty missed)		(penalty scored) Bouby; (penalty missed) Diaw; (penalty missed) Courtet; (penalty missed) Hountondji; (penalty missed) Sefil

15 December 2015 Round of 16	Rennes	1–3	Toulouse	Rennes
21:00 CET (UTC+01:00)	Sylla (red card) 16'; Fernandes (yellow card) 21'; Diagné 57' (pen.)	Report	Ben Yedder 13', 32'; Regattin 84'; Machach (yellow card) 90'	Stadium: Roazhon Park; Attendance: 14,672; Referee: Benoît Bastien

13 January 2016 Quarter-final	Toulouse	2–1 (a.e.t.)	Marseille	Toulouse
17:00 CET (UTC+01:00)	Ben Yedder 25'; Diop (yellow card) 94'; Braithwaite 99'	Report	Nkoudou 27'; Rolando (yellow card) 78'; Sparagna (yellow card) 87'	Stadium: Stadium Municipal; Attendance: 18,163; Referee: Benoît Millot

27 January 2016 Semi-finals	Paris Saint-Germain	2–0	Toulouse	Paris
21:05 CET (UTC+01:00)	Lavezzi 65'; Aurier (yellow card) 69'; Di María 72'; Kimpembe (yellow card) 89'	Report		Stadium: Parc des Princes; Attendance: 46,897; Referee: Amaury Delerue
