= 2014–15 Toulouse FC season =

Toulouse
2014–15 season
- Chairman: Olivier Sadran
- Manager: Alain Casanova (Until 16 March); Dominique Arribagé (From 16 March)
- Stadium: Stadium Municipal
- Ligue 1: 17th
- Coupe de France: Round of 64
- Coupe de la Ligue: Round of 32
- Top goalscorer: League: Wissam Ben Yedder (7); All: Wissam Ben Yedder (8)
- Highest home attendance: 20,762 vs Paris Saint-Germain (27 September 2014)
- Lowest home attendance: 7,701 vs Bordeaux (4 January 2015)
Home colours	Away colours	Third colours

The 2014–15 Toulouse FC season is the 45th professional season of the club since its creation in 1970.

== Players ==
=== First team squad ===
French teams are limited to four players without EU citizenship. Hence, the squad list includes only the principal nationality of each player; several non-European players on the squad have dual citizenship with an EU country. Also, players from the ACP countries—countries in Africa, the Caribbean, and the Pacific that are signatories to the Cotonou Agreement—are not counted against non-EU quotas due to the Kolpak ruling.

Note: Flags indicate national team as defined under FIFA eligibility rules; some limited exceptions apply. Players may hold more than one non-FIFA nationality.

No.	Pos.	Nation	Player
1	GK	FRA	Zacharie Boucher
2	DF	FRA	Maxime Spano
3	DF	CMR	Jean-Armel Kana-Biyik
4	MF	MLI	Tongo Doumbia
5	DF	GUI	Issiaga Sylla
6	DF	BRA	William Matheus
7	DF	CIV	Jean-Daniel Akpa Akpro
8	MF	FRA	Étienne Didot
9	FW	DEN	Martin Braithwaite
10	FW	FRA	Wissam Ben Yedder
11	FW	SRB	Aleksandar Pešić
12	FW	FRA	Florian David
14	MF	FRA	Pantxi Sirieix
15	DF	SRB	Uroš Spajić
16	GK	FRA	Marc Vidal
17	MF	MAR	Adrien Regattin

No.	Pos.	Nation	Player
18	MF	ARG	Óscar Trejo
20	DF	BFA	Steeve Yago
21	MF	COL	Abel Aguilar (Captain)
22	DF	SRB	Dušan Veškovac
23	DF	FRA	Marcel Tisserand (on loan from Monaco)
24	DF	SRB	Pavle Ninkov
25	DF	ROU	Dragoș Grigore
26	FW	BFA	Zaniou Sana
27	FW	FRA	Amadou Soukouna
28	MF	ROU	Mihai Roman
29	DF	SUI	François Moubandje
30	GK	FRA	Ali Ahamada
34	MF	FRA	Alexis Blin
40	GK	FRA	Lionel Mpasi
—	MF	FRA	Yann Bodiger

=== Out on loan ===
Note: Flags indicate national team as defined under FIFA eligibility rules; some limited exceptions apply. Players may hold more than one non-FIFA nationality.

No. / Pos. / Nation / Player; - / DF / CIV / Serge Aurier (on loan to Paris Saint-Germain)	No. / Pos. / Nation / Player; - / MF / POL / Dominik Furman (on loan to Legia Warsaw)

== Competitions ==
=== Ligue 1 ===
==== League table ====
Pos	Team	Pld	W	D	L	GF	GA	GD	Pts	Qualification or relegation
15	Reims	38	12	8	18	47	66	−19	44	
16	Lorient	38	12	7	19	44	50	−6	43	
17	Toulouse	38	12	6	20	43	64	−21	42	
18	Evian (R)	38	11	4	23	41	62	−21	37	Relegation to Ligue 2
19	Metz (R)	38	7	9	22	31	61	−30	30	Relegation to Ligue 2

Source: Ligue 1
Rules for classification: 1) points; 2) goal difference; 3) number of goals scored
(R) Relegated

==== Results summary ====
Overall								Home						Away					
Pld	W	D	L	GF	GA	GD	Pts	W	D	L	GF	GA	GD	W	D	L	GF	GA	GD
38	12	6	20	43	64	−21	42	8	6	5	28	29	−1	4	0	15	15	35	−20

Last updated: 23 May 2015.
Source: Competitive matches

==== Results by round ====
Round	1	2	3	4	5	6	7	8	9	10	11	12	13	14	15	16	17	18	19	20	21	22	23	24	25	26	27	28	29	30	31	32	33	34	35	36	37	38
Ground	A	H	A	H	A	H	A	H	A	A	H	A	H	A	H	A	H	A	H	A	H	A	H	A	H	A	H	H	A	H	A	H	A	H	A	H	A	H
Result	L	W	L	W	L	D	W	D	W	L	L	L	W	L	L	W	L	L	D	L	D	L	W	L	W	L	D	L	L	W	L	W	W	D	L	W	L	L
Position	14	12	14	12	15	14	10	11	8	9	12	14	11	14	14	11	13	15	14	15	16	17	14	17	17	18	18	18	18	18	18	18	15	14	16	16	17	17

Source: Ligue 1
A = Away; H = Home; W = Win; D = Draw; L = Loss

==== Matches ====
Win Draw Loss

9 August 2014 1	Nice	3–2	Toulouse	Nice
21:00 CEST (UTC+02:00)	Cvitanich 23', 62'; Bosetti 68'	Report	Braithwaite 44'; Ben Yedder 45'; Regattin (yellow card) 58'	Stadium: Allianz Riviera; Attendance: 20,729; Referee: Frank Schneider

16 August 2014 2	Toulouse	2–1	Lyon	Toulouse
20:00 CEST (UTC+02:00)	Akpa Akpro 10'; Veškovac (yellow card) 21'; Grigore (yellow card) 37'; Ben Yedder 45'; Moubandje (yellow card) 84'	Report	Mvuemba (yellow card) 44'; Lacazette 75'	Stadium: Stadium Municipal; Attendance: 13,275; Referee: Bartolomeu Varela

23 August 2014 3	Bastia	1–0	Toulouse	Bastia
20:00 CEST (UTC+02:00)	Boudebouz 24' (pen.); Ba (yellow card) 35'; Romaric (yellow card) 70'; Junior Tallo (yellow card) 76'	Report	Moubandje (yellow card) 23'	Stadium: Stade Armand Cesari; Attendance: 13,797; Referee: Sébastien Moreira

30 August 2013 4	Toulouse	1–0	Evian	Toulouse
20:00 CEST (UTC+02:00)	Grigore (yellow card) 45'; Regattin 78'	Report	Angoula (yellow card) 17' (yellow-red card) 83'; Bille Nielsen (yellow card) 35'	Stadium: Stadium Municipal; Attendance: 10,206; Referee: Benoît Millot

13 September 2014 5	Reims	2–0	Toulouse	Reims
20:00 CEST (UTC+02:00)	Ngog 13'; Courtet 86'	Report		Stadium: Stade Auguste Delaune; Attendance: 11,019; Referee: Alexandre Castro

20 September 2014 6	Toulouse	3–3	Caen	Toulouse
20:00 CEST (UTC+02:00)	Pešić (yellow card) 11'; Ben Yedder 21' (pen.); Ninkov (yellow card) 56', (goal) 87'; Regattin 83' (pen.)	Report	Raspentino 7'; Da Silva (yellow card) 13'; Appiah (yellow card) 32'; Adeoti (yellow card) 58'; Nangis 76'; Calvé 86'	Stadium: Stadium Municipal; Attendance: 13,057; Referee: Benoît Bastien

23 September 2014 7	Rennes	0–3	Toulouse	Rennes
21:00 CEST (UTC+02:00)	Fernandes (yellow card) 10'; Habibou (yellow card) 22'; Prcić (yellow card) 45+1'	Report	Aguilar (yellow card) 18'; Pešić 42'; Diagné 57' (o.g.); Ben Yedder 61'; Trejo (yellow card) 89'	Stadium: Route de Lorient; Attendance: 17,182; Referee: Fredy Fautrel

27 September 2014 8	Toulouse	1–1	Paris Saint-Germain	Toulouse
21:00 CEST (UTC+02:00)	Ben Yedder 8'	Report	Bahebeck 33'; Verratti (yellow card) 48'; Cabaye (yellow card) 51'; Luiz (yellow card) 87'	Stadium: Stadium Municipal; Attendance: 20,762; Referee: Tony Chapron

5 October 2014 9	Saint-Étienne	0–1	Toulouse	Saint-Étienne
14:00 CEST (UTC+02:00)	Lemoine (yellow card) 40'	Report	Ben Yedder 22'; Ninkov (yellow card) 55'	Stadium: Stade Geoffroy-Guichard; Attendance: 27,581; Referee: Philippe Kalt

20 October 2014 10	Marseille	2–0	Toulouse	Marseille
14:00 CEST (UTC+02:00)	N'Koulou 20'; Gignac 35'; Romao (yellow card) 41'; Ayew (yellow card) 89'	Report	Aguilar (yellow card) 40'; Yago (yellow card) 41'; Akpa Akpro (yellow card) 73'	Stadium: Stade Vélodrome; Attendance: 61,846; Referee: Amaury Delerue

24 October 2014 11	Toulouse	0–2	Lens	Toulouse
20:30 CEST (UTC+02:00)	Grigore (yellow card) 90+2'	Report	El Jadeyaoui 11', (yellow card) 58'; Bourigeaud 27'; Sylla (yellow card) 88'	Stadium: Stadium Municipal; Attendance: 12,105; Referee: Wilfried Bien

2 November 2014 12	Bordeaux	2–1	Toulouse	Bordeaux
17:00 CET (UTC+01:00)	Planus 52'; Rolán 63'	Report	Grigore (yellow card) 14'; Moubandje (yellow card) 50'; Akpa Akpro (yellow card) 57'; Pešić 68'; Didot (yellow card) 82'	Stadium: Stade Chaban-Delmas; Attendance: 16,618; Referee: Saïd Ennjimi

8 November 2014 13	Toulouse	3–0	Metz	Toulouse
20:00 CET (UTC+01:00)	Sirieix 3', (yellow card) 54'; Ben Yedder 61'; Pešić 71'	Report	Vion (yellow card) 15'	Stadium: Stadium Municipal; Attendance: 16,412; Referee: Frank Schneider

23 November 2014 14	Montpellier	2–0	Toulouse	Montpellier
17:00 CET (UTC+01:00)	Mounier 37'; Bérigaud (yellow card) 54'; Camara 87'	Report	Didot (yellow card) 56'; Aguilar (yellow card) 69'	Stadium: Altrad Stadium; Attendance: 9,270; Referee: Sébastien Desiage

29 November 2014 15	Toulouse	2–3	Lorient	Toulouse
20:00 CET (UTC+01:00)	Doumbia 23'; Pešić (yellow card) 45', (goal) 70'	Report	Guerreiro 55'; Jeannot 57'; Ayew 60' (pen.)	Stadium: Stadium Municipal; Attendance: 20,550; Referee: Alexandre Castro

2 December 2014 16	Nantes	1–2	Toulouse	Nantes
19:00 CET (UTC+01:00)	Deaux (yellow card) 39'; Veretout 64' (pen.)	Report	Doumbia (yellow card) 20'; Sylla 24', (yellow card) 56'; Didot (yellow card) 45+1'; Braithwaite 85'	Stadium: Stade de la Beaujoire; Attendance: 19,669; Referee: Antony Gautier

5 December 2014 17	Toulouse	0–2	Monaco	Toulouse
20:30 CET (UTC+01:00)	Grigore (yellow card) 53'	Report	Berbatov (yellow card) 33', (goal) 45', 77' (pen.); Ocampos (yellow card) 90+4'	Stadium: Stadium Municipal; Attendance: 9,978; Referee: Mikael Lesage

14 December 2014 18	Lille	3–0	Toulouse	Villeneuve-d'Ascq
17:00 CET (UTC+01:00)	Sidibé 7'; Mendes 50'; Baša (yellow card) 57'; Roux (yellow card) 70' (goal) 77'; Souaré (yellow card) 72'	Report	Spano (red card) 1'; Akpa Akpro (yellow card) 27'; Tisserand (yellow card) 89'	Stadium: Stade Pierre-Mauroy; Attendance: 37,938; Referee: Fredy Fautrel

20 December 2014 19	Toulouse	1–1	Guingamp	Toulouse
20:00 CET (UTC+01:00)	Doumbia 25'; Sirieix (yellow card) 43'; Moubandje (yellow card) 50'	Report	Giresse 8'	Stadium: Stadium Municipal; Attendance: 14,190; Referee: Saïd Ennjimi

11 January 2015 20	Lyon	3–0	Toulouse	Lyon
17:00 CET (UTC+01:00)	Lacazette 14', 27'; Dabo (yellow card) 39'; Fekir 48'	Report	Trejo (yellow card) 57'; Tisserand (yellow card) 61'; Aguilar (yellow card) 77'	Stadium: Stade de Gerland; Attendance: 35,928; Referee: Philippe Kalt

17 January 2015 21	Toulouse	1–1	Bastia	Toulouse
20:00 CET (UTC+01:00)	Braithwaite 78'; Grigore (yellow card) 84'	Report	Koné (yellow card) 47'; Ahamada 48' (o.g.)	Stadium: Stadium Municipal; Attendance: 10,215; Referee: Frank Schneider

25 January 2015 22	Evian	1–0	Toulouse	Annecy
14:00 CET (UTC+01:00)	Thomasson 4'	Report	Blin (yellow card) 57'; Ninkov (red card) 61'; Grigore (yellow card) 80'	Stadium: Parc des Sports; Attendance: 8,022; Referee: Benoît Bastien

31 January 2015 23	Toulouse	1–0	Reims	Toulouse
20:00 CET (UTC+01:00)	Didot (yellow card) 15'; Pešić 43', (yellow card) 44'; Doumbia (yellow card) 83'	Report	Weber (yellow card) 7'; Fortes (yellow card) 89'	Stadium: Stadium Municipal; Attendance: 15,115; Referee: Stéphane Jochem

7 February 2015 24	Caen	2–0	Toulouse	Caen
20:00 CET (UTC+01:00)	Privat 17'; Féret 72' (pen.)	Report	Doumbia (yellow card) 4'; Tisserand (yellow card) 54'	Stadium: Stade Michel d'Ornano; Attendance: 13,960; Referee: Wilfried Bien

14 February 2015 25	Toulouse	2–1	Rennes	Toulouse
20:00 CET (UTC+01:00)	Trejo 9'; Pešić 84'; Regattin (yellow card) 89'	Report	M'Bengue (yellow card) 62'; Toivonen 82'	Stadium: Stadium Municipal; Attendance: 14,786; Referee: Alexandre Castro

21 February 2015 26	Paris Saint-Germain	3–1	Toulouse	Paris
17:00 CET (UTC+01:00)	Rabiot 27', 48'; Cavani (yellow card) 45+2'; Silva 74'; Bahebeck (yellow card) 88'	Report	Ben Yedder 51'; Aguilar (yellow card) 86'	Stadium: Parc des Princes; Attendance: 45,628; Referee: Amaury Delerue

28 February 2015 27	Toulouse	1–1	Saint-Étienne	Toulouse
20:00 CET (UTC+01:00)	Spajić (yellow card) 44'; Grigore (yellow card) 68'; Akpa Akpro 88'	Report	Gradel 45' (pen.); Hamouma (yellow card) 80'	Stadium: Stadium Municipal; Attendance: 14,579; Referee: Frank Schneider

6 March 2015 28	Toulouse	1–6	Marseille	Toulouse
20:30 CEST (UTC+02:00)	Ben Yedder 77'; Akpa Akpro (yellow card) 90+1'	Report	Batshuayi 2', 44'; Aloé 6'; Moubandje 20' (o.g.); Mandanda (yellow card) 35'; Ayew (yellow card) 62', (goal) 78'; Gignac 89'	Stadium: Stadium Municipal; Attendance: 19,000; Referee: Tony Chapron

14 March 2015 29	Lens	1–0	Toulouse	Amiens
20:00 CET (UTC+01:00)	Nomenjanahary (yellow card) 66'; Chavarria 77'; Landre (yellow card) 90'	Report	Grigore (yellow card) 68'	Stadium: Stade de la Licorne; Attendance: 7,494; Referee: Sébastien Desiage

21 March 2015 30	Toulouse	2–1	Bordeaux	Toulouse
20:00 CET (UTC+01:00)	Ben Yedder 18'; Yago (yellow card) 30'; Kana-Biyik 61'; Pešić (yellow card) 62'	Report	Plašil (yellow card) 17'; Rolán 29'; Khazri (yellow card) 62'; Sané (yellow card) 62' (yellow-red card) 90+2'	Stadium: Stadium Municipal; Attendance: 15,288; Referee: Ruddy Buquet

4 April 2015 31	Metz	3–2	Toulouse	Metz
20:00 CEST (UTC+02:00)	Sarr (yellow card) 2'; Maïga 25', 42' (54); José Luis Palomino (yellow card) 90+2'	Summary	Pešić (yellow card) 6'; Tisserand (yellow card) 10' (yellow-red card) 60'; Ben Yedder 22'; Regattin (yellow card) 71'; Bodiger (yellow card) 80'; Doumbia 90'	Stadium: Stade Municipal Saint-Symphorien; Attendance: 20,072; Referee: Bartolomeu Varela

12 April 2015 32	Toulouse	1–0	Montpellier	Toulouse
17:00 CEST (UTC+02:00)	Ninkov (yellow card) 27'; Trejo 45+2'; Doumbia (yellow card) 55'	Report	Hilton (yellow card) 77'; Deplagne (yellow card) 85'	Stadium: Stadium Municipal; Attendance: 18,734; Referee: Wilfried Bien

18 April 2015 33	Lorient	0–1	Toulouse	Lorient
20:00 CEST (UTC+02:00)	Le Goff (yellow card) 27'; Bellugou (yellow card) 74'; Gassama (yellow card) 78'	Report	Braithwaite 28'; Moubandje (red card) 85'	Stadium: Stade du Moustoir; Attendance: 13,511; Referee: Alexandre Castro

25 April 2015 34	Toulouse	1–1	Nantes	Toulouse
20:00 CEST (UTC+02:00)	Regattin 22'; Trejo (yellow card) 70'	Report	Cissokho (yellow card) 29'; Gomis (yellow card) 51'; Bedoya 88'	Stadium: Stadium Municipal; Attendance: 17,274; Referee: Lionel Jaffredo

2 May 2015 35	Monaco	4–1	Toulouse	Monaco
17:00 CEST (UTC+02:00)	Silva 9'; Kondogbia (yellow card) 43'; Raggi (yellow card) 44'; Martial 45+1' (pen.); Moutinho 56'; Dirar (red card) 80'; Germain 90+2'	Report	Braithwaite 26'; Kana-Biyik (red card) 80'	Stadium: Stade Louis II; Attendance: 7,006; Referee: Nicolas Rainville

9 May 2015 36	Toulouse	3–2	Lille	Toulouse
20:00 CEST (UTC+02:00)	Ben Yedder 30'; Bodiger (yellow card) 36'; Trejo 81'; Braithwaite 83'	Report	Roux 9'; Boufal 60'; Sidibé (yellow card) 79'	Stadium: Stadium Municipal; Attendance: 19,830; Referee: Sébastien Desiage

16 May 2015 37	Guingamp	2–1	Toulouse	Guingamp
21:00 CEST (UTC+02:00)	Mandanne 5'; Beauvue 49'; Kerbrat (red card) 60'; Diallo (yellow card) 86'	Report	Ben Yedder 26' (pen.); Trejo (yellow card) 82'	Stadium: Stade du Roudourou; Attendance: 17,239; Referee: Benoît Bastien

23 May 2015 38	Toulouse	2–3	Nice	Toulouse
21:00 CEST (UTC+02:00)	Akpa Akpro (yellow card) 35'; Ben Yedder 79'; Trejo 81'; Bodiger (yellow card) 84'	Summary	Maupay 8', (yellow card) 23'; Koziello (yellow card) 16'; Bauthéac 34', 53'; Palun (yellow card) 76'; Bodmer (yellow card) 83'	Stadium: Stadium Municipal; Attendance: 19,830; Referee: Lionel Jaffredo

=== Coupe de France ===
4 January 2015 Round of 64	Toulouse	1–2	Bordeaux	Bordeaux
13:15 CET (UTC+01:00)	Aguilar (yellow card) 42'; Moubandje (yellow card) 77'; Ben Yedder 84'	Report	Touré 10' (pen.); Traoré 71'	Stadium: Stade Chaban-Delmas; Attendance: 7,701; Referee: Lionel Jaffredo

=== Coupe de la Ligue ===
28 October 2014 Round of 32	Toulouse	1–3	Bordeaux	Toulouse
21:00 CEST (UTC+02:00)	Akpa Akpro 84'	Report	Pallois 17' (yellow card) 61' (yellow-red card) 63'; Kaabouni (yellow card) 23'; Contento 24'; Diabaté 68'	Stadium: Stadium Municipal; Attendance: 11,331; Referee: Fredy Fautrel
