= Rahou =

Rahou may refer to:

- Omar Rahou
- Maxime Spano Rahou
- Slimane Rahou
- Abdelmalek Rahou
