= Issa Diop (footballer) =

Moroccan footballer (born 1997)

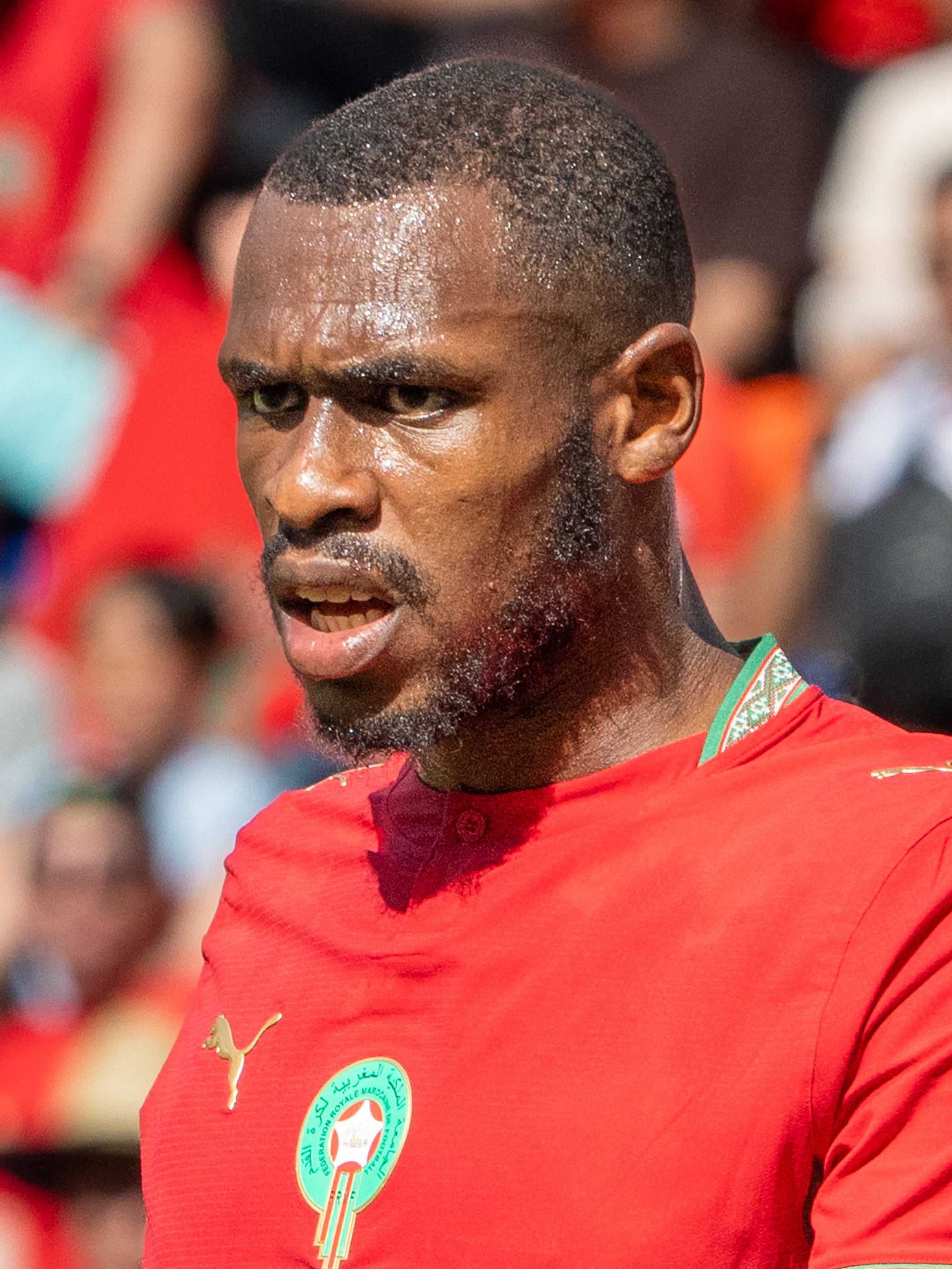
- Diop with Morocco in 2026

Personal information
- Full name: Issa Laye Lucas Jean Diop
- Date of birth: 9 January 1997 (age 29)
- Place of birth: Toulouse, France
- Height: 1.96 m (6 ft 5 in)
- Position: Centre-back

Team information
- Current team: Ipswich Town
- Number: 6

Youth career
- 2004–2006: Balma SC
- 2006–2015: Toulouse

Senior career*
Years	Team	Apps	(Gls)
2014–2015	Toulouse B	7	(0)
2015–2018	Toulouse	85	(6)
2018–2022	West Ham United	96	(6)
2022–2026	Fulham	77	(2)
2026–	Ipswich Town	7	(0)

International career^{‡}
2013	France U16	4	(0)
2013	France U17	5	(0)
2015	France U18	2	(0)
2015–2016	France U19	20	(3)
2017	France U20	3	(0)
2016–2018	France U21	6	(0)
2026–	Morocco	12	(1)
- * Club domestic league appearances and goals as of 23:24, 17 October 2026 (UTC) ‡ National team caps and goals as of 23:15, 4 October 2026 (UTC)

Issa Laye Lucas Jean Diop (born 9 January 1997) is a professional footballer who plays as a centre-back for Premier League club Ipswich Town. Born in France, and a former France youth international, he plays for the Morocco national team.

Diop began his career at his hometown club Toulouse, making his senior debut during the 2015–16 season. He became the club's captain in 2017, before leaving for English club West Ham United in 2018, signing for a club-record fee.

== Early life and family ==
Diop was born in Toulouse, France. His father is of Senegalese origin while his mother hails from a Moroccan background. His grandfather, Lybasse Diop, played for Bordeaux and was the first Senegalese footballer in Ligue 1.

On 19 June 2023, according to La Dépêche du Midi, Diop was taken into custody in Toulouse for alleged death threats against his former partner.

== Club career ==
=== Toulouse ===
Diop played youth football for Balma SC before moving to Toulouse FC in 2006. He began training with the first team in September 2015, and signed a professional contract in November. He was part of an influx of young players to the squad that included Alban Lafont, Zinédine Machach, Alexis Blin and Yann Bodiger.

He made his Ligue 1 debut, aged 18, on 28 November 2015 against Nice, playing the full game alongside fellow debutant Lafont. He scored his first goal in his second appearance on 2 December 2015, contributing to his club's 3–0 win away to fellow relegation strugglers Troyes. He made 21 appearances in his first season, helping the club to eight clean sheets. He was sent off twice during a season in which the club only avoided relegation with a win on the final day.

Diop made 30 Ligue 1 appearances in 2016–17. He was named captain of his local club for the first time in April 2017.

The 2017–18 season saw Diop become club captain in October. Toulouse reached the quarter-finals of the Coupe de France, but again struggled in the league, avoiding relegation after a play-off victory against AC Ajaccio in May 2018.

=== West Ham United ===
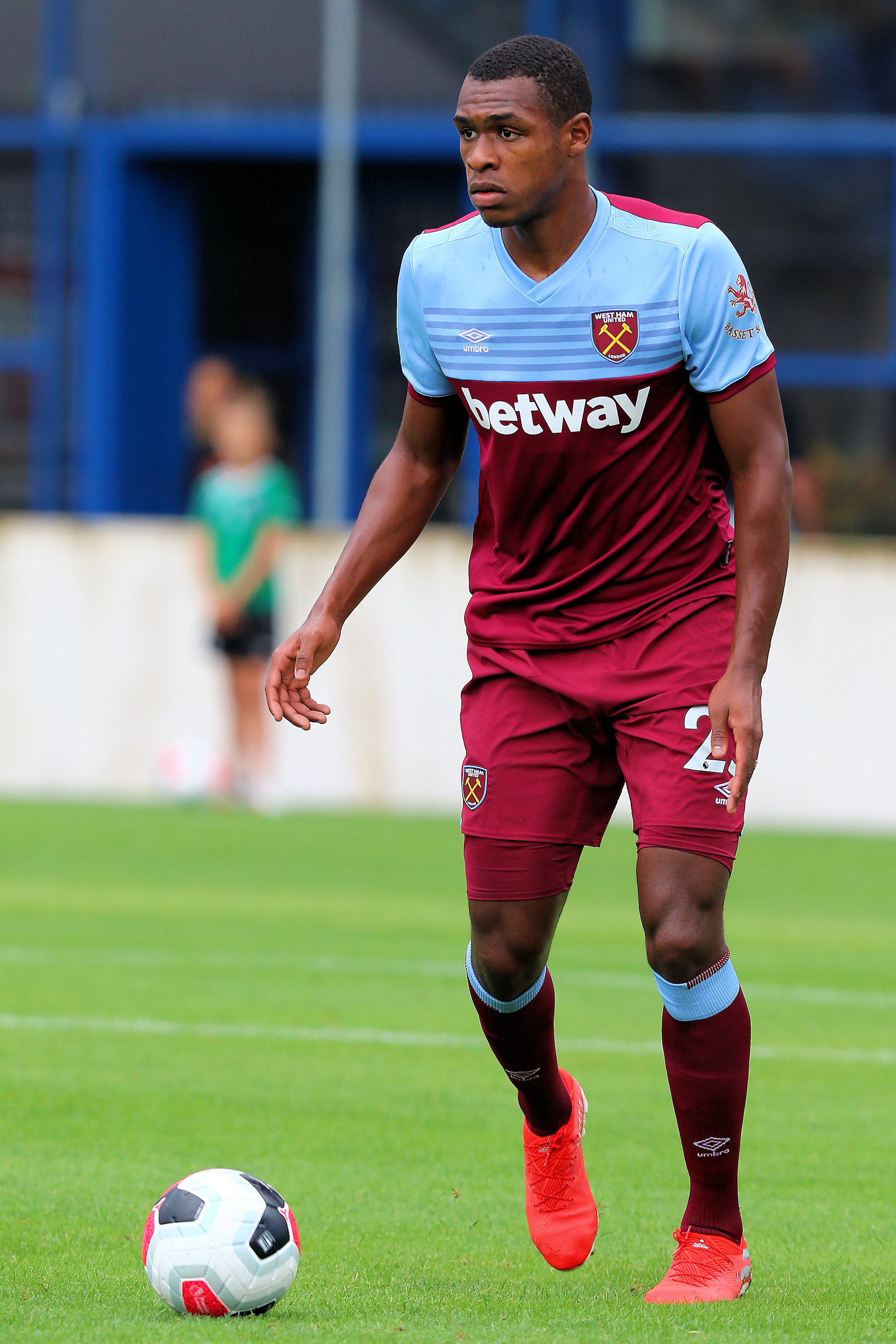
Diop playing for West Ham United in 2019

On 19 June 2018, Premier League club West Ham United confirmed the transfer of Diop, who signed a five-year contract. The fee, reported by British media as £22 million, was not disclosed but was announced as a club record, beating the previous record of £20 million set in July 2017 with the signing of Marko Arnautović. Diop made his Premier League and West Ham debut on 25 August. In a 3–1 away defeat by Arsenal, he scored an own goal and in doing so became the first West Ham player to score an own goal on his debut in the Premier League. Three days later, Diop scored his first goal for the club, in an EFL Cup game against AFC Wimbledon after conceding a goal after only 72 seconds, Diop scored an equalising goal for West Ham who went on to win 3–1. He won early season praise for his performances particularly against Arsenal and against Manchester United whose manager, José Mourinho commended Diop's performance in West Ham's 3–1 win over his club and of the scout who had identified the potential of Diop. On 22 February 2019, Diop scored his first Premier League goal in a 3–1 home win against Fulham.

On 22 September 2020, Diop was pulled from the West Ham squad before their EFL Cup game against Hull City after testing positive for COVID-19. On 9 February 2021, in a FA Cup game against Manchester United, Diop became the first concussion substitute in English football when he was replaced by Ryan Fredericks following a head injury. The club subsequently reported that Diop had suffered no adverse effects, with manager David Moyes praising the club's medical staff for the way they handled Diop's injury. Although initially a regular player for West Ham, following the arrival of Craig Dawson and Kurt Zouma in the 2021–22 season, Diop was picked less often. Before transferring to Fulham in August 2022, Diop made 121 appearances for West Ham scoring eight goals.

=== Fulham ===
On 10 August 2022, Diop transferred permanently to Fulham on a five-year contract for an undisclosed fee. Diop made his Fulham debut on 23 August in a 2–0 away defeat to League Two team, Crawley Town in the League Cup second round. Diop scored his first goal for Fulham on 15 October in a 2–2 draw at home to AFC Bournemouth.

=== Ipswich Town ===
On 22 July 2026, Diop signed a four-year contract with Ipswich Town.

== International career ==
Diop has been a youth international for France at every level, making his first appearance for France U16 in 2013. He was part of the team that won the 2016 UEFA European Under-19 Championship, scoring in the final. In addition to winning the tournament itself, Diop was also named in the Team of the Tournament.

He made his debut for France U21 in a qualification game for the 2017 UEFA European Under-21 Championship, against Ukraine on 2 September 2016.

He was eligible to play for Morocco through his mother and for Senegal through his father. In October 2018, he confirmed his international commitment to France. However, on 19 March 2026, it was announced that Diop had been selected to the Morocco national team for the first time. Seven days later, his request to switch allegiance to Morocco was approved by FIFA.

On 26 May 2026, Diop was selected in the 26-man squad for the 2026 FIFA World Cup. On 29 June 2026, Diop scored his first international goal against the Netherlands in stoppage time of the second half during the Round of 32 knockout match, taking the game into extra time and ultimately penalties, where Morocco prevailed 3–2. He was also named Man of the Match.

== Style of play ==
Diop, at 1.94 m (6 ft 4 in) in height, has been credited as being "a tremendous athlete, excellent in the air and quick across the ground" by football magazine FourFourTwo. He has played mainly as a right-sided centre-back. Along with the two red cards received in 2015–16, Diop amassed 25 yellow cards over the course of his three seasons at Toulouse.

== Career statistics ==
=== Club ===
As of match played 17 October 2026

Appearances and goals by club, season and competition
Club	Season	League			National cup (Note: Includes Coupe de France, FA Cup)		League cup (Note: Includes Coupe de la Ligue, EFL Cup)		Europe		Other		Total	
Club	Season	Division	Apps	Goals	Apps	Goals	Apps	Goals	Apps	Goals	Apps	Goals	Apps	Goals
Toulouse B	2014–15	CFA 2	3	0	—		—		—		—		3	0
Toulouse B	2015–16	CFA 2	4	0	—		—		—		—		4	0
Toulouse B	Total		7	0	—		—		—		—		7	0
Toulouse	2015–16	Ligue 1	21	1	1	0	1	0	—		—		23	1
Toulouse	2016–17	Ligue 1	30	2	1	0	0	0	—		—		31	2
Toulouse	2017–18	Ligue 1	34	3	2	0	3	0	—		2 (Note: Appearances in Ligue 1 relegation/promotion play-offs)	0	41	3
Toulouse	Total		85	6	4	0	4	0	—		2	0	95	6
West Ham United	2018–19	Premier League	33	1	2	0	3	1	—		—		38	2
West Ham United	2019–20	Premier League	32	3	2	0	2	0	—		—		36	3
West Ham United	2020–21	Premier League	18	2	2	0	1	0	—		—		21	2
West Ham United	2021–22	Premier League	13	0	3	0	3	0	7 (Note: Appearances in UEFA Europa League)	1	—		26	1
West Ham United	Total		96	6	9	0	9	1	7	1	—		121	8
Fulham	2022–23	Premier League	25	1	3	0	1	0	—		—		29	1
Fulham	2023–24	Premier League	18	0	2	0	5	1	—		—		25	1
Fulham	2024–25	Premier League	21	0	2	0	1	0	—		—		24	0
Fulham	2025–26	Premier League	13	1	2	0	3	0	—		—		18	1
Fulham	Total		77	2	9	0	10	1	—		—		96	3
Ipswich Town	2026–27	Premier League	7	0	0	0	0	0	—		—		7	0
Career total			272	14	22	0	23	2	7	1	2	0	326	17

=== International ===
As of match played 4 October 2026

Appearances and goals by national team and year
National team	Year	Apps	Goals
Morocco	2026	12	1
Total		12	1

Morocco score listed first, score column indicates score after each Diop goal.

List of international goals scored by Issa Diop
No.	Date	Venue	Cap	Opponent	Score	Result	Competition
1	29 June 2026	Estadio BBVA, Guadalupe, Mexico	7	Netherlands	1–1	1–1 (a.e.t.) (3–2 p)	2026 FIFA World Cup

== Honours ==
France U19

- UEFA European Under-19 Championship: 2016

Individual

- UEFA European Under-19 Championship Team of the Tournament: 2016
