= Somália (footballer, born 1988) =

Brazilian footballer

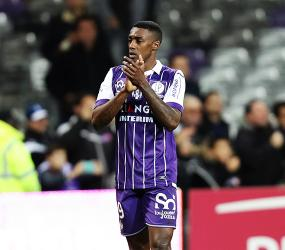
- Somália with Toulouse in 2016

Personal information
- Full name: Wergiton do Rosário Calmon
- Date of birth: 28 September 1988 (age 38)
- Place of birth: Rio de Janeiro, Brazil
- Height: 1.80 m (5 ft 11 in)
- Position: Midfielder

Senior career*
| Years | Team | Apps | (Gls) |
| 2007–2011 | Bangu | 39 | (13) |
| 2008 | → Resende (loan) | | |
| 2009 | → Madureira (loan) | | |
| 2010 | → Paraná (loan) | 24 | (1) |
| 2011–2012 | → Ferencváros (loan) | 15 | (4) |
| 2012–2015 | Ferencváros | 78 | (10) |
| 2015–2018 | Toulouse | 86 | (1) |
| 2018–2020 | Al-Shabab | 21 | (1) |
| 2020–2022 | Ferencváros | 36 | (3) |
- * Club domestic league appearances and goals as of 15 May 2022 (UTC)

Wergiton do Rosario Calmon (born 28 September 1988), known as Somália, is a Brazilian professional footballer who plays as a midfielder.

== Career ==
Before joining Toulouse in 2015, Somália played for Hungarian club Ferencváros.

In August 2018, he joined Saudi Arabian side Al-Shabab on a two-year contract.

=== Ferencváros ===
On 16 June 2020, he became champion with Ferencváros by beating Budapest Honvéd FC at the Hidegkuti Nándor Stadion on the 30th match day of the 2019–20 Nemzeti Bajnokság I season.

On 29 September 2020, he was member of the Ferencváros team which qualified for the 2020–21 UEFA Champions League group stage after beating Molde FK on 3-3 aggregate (away goals) at the Groupama Aréna.

== Club statistics ==
As of match played 15 May 2022

Appearances and goals by club, season and competition
| Club | Season | League | | | Cup | | League Cup | | Europe | | Other | | Total | |
| Club | Season | Division | Apps | Goals | Apps | Goals | Apps | Goals | Apps | Goals | Apps | Goals | Apps | Goals |
|---|---|---|---|---|---|---|---|---|---|---|---|---|---|---|
| Ferencváros | 2011–12 | Nemzeti Bajnokság I | 15 | 4 | 3 | 2 | 0 | 0 | 0 | 0 | – | | 18 | 6 |
| Ferencváros | 2012–13 | Nemzeti Bajnokság I | 28 | 5 | 1 | 0 | 9 | 3 | 0 | 0 | – | | 38 | 8 |
| Ferencváros | 2013–14 | Nemzeti Bajnokság I | 23 | 4 | 3 | 1 | 8 | 0 | 0 | 0 | – | | 34 | 5 |
| Ferencváros | 2014–15 | Nemzeti Bajnokság I | 24 | 1 | 4 | 0 | 1 | 0 | 4 | 0 | – | | 33 | 1 |
| Ferencváros | 2015–16 | Nemzeti Bajnokság I | 3 | 0 | 0 | 0 | 0 | 0 | 4 | 0 | 1 | 1 | 8 | 1 |
| Ferencváros | 2019–20 | Nemzeti Bajnokság I | 6 | 0 | 0 | 0 | 0 | 0 | 0 | 0 | 0 | 0 | 6 | 0 |
| Ferencváros | 2020–21 | Nemzeti Bajnokság I | 24 | 3 | 1 | 0 | 0 | 0 | 11 | 0 | 0 | 0 | 36 | 3 |
| Ferencváros | 2021–22 | Nemzeti Bajnokság I | 6 | 0 | 2 | 0 | 0 | 0 | 10 | 0 | 0 | 0 | 18 | 0 |
| Ferencváros | Total | | 129 | 17 | 14 | 3 | 18 | 3 | 29 | 0 | 1 | 1 | 191 | 24 |
| Toulouse | 2015–16 | Ligue 1 | 29 | 0 | 1 | 1 | 2 | 0 | – | | – | | 32 | 1 |
| Toulouse | 2016–17 | Ligue 1 | 28 | 0 | 1 | 0 | 2 | 0 | – | | – | | 31 | 0 |
| Toulouse | 2017–18 | Ligue 1 | 27 | 1 | 1 | 1 | 1 | 0 | – | | 2 | 0 | 31 | 2 |
| Toulouse | Total | | 84 | 1 | 3 | 2 | 5 | 0 | 0 | 0 | 2 | 0 | 94 | 3 |
| Al-Shabab | 2018–19 | Saudi Professional League | 15 | 1 | 1 | 0 | 0 | 0 | – | | – | | 16 | 1 |
| Al-Shabab | 2019–20 | Saudi Professional League | 6 | 0 | 0 | 0 | 0 | 0 | – | | – | | 6 | 0 |
| Al-Shabab | Total | | 21 | 1 | 1 | 0 | 0 | 0 | 0 | 0 | 0 | 0 | 22 | 1 |
| Career total | | | 220 | 18 | 18 | 5 | 23 | 3 | 29 | 0 | 3 | 1 | 293 | 27 |

== Honours ==
Ferencváros

- Nemzeti Bajnokság I: 2015–162019–20, 2020–21
- Magyar Kupa: 2014–15,
- Ligakupa: 2012–13, 2014–15
- Szuperkupa: 2015
