= Martin Braithwaite =

Danish footballer (born 1991)

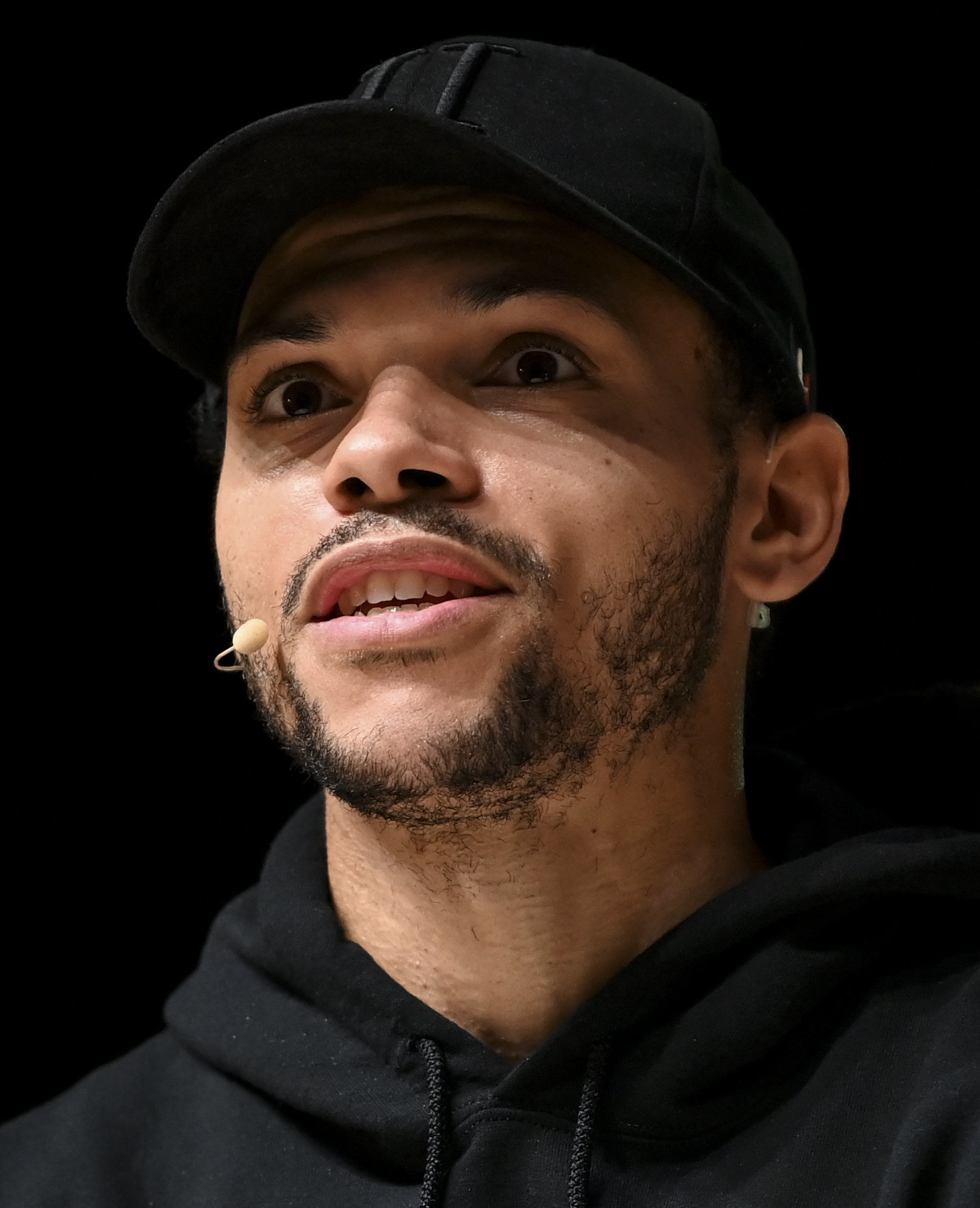
- Braithwaite in 2021

Personal information
- Full name: Martin Christensen Braithwaite
- Date of birth: 5 June 1991 (age 35)
- Place of birth: Esbjerg, Denmark
- Height: 1.80 m (5 ft 11 in)
- Positions: Striker; winger

Team information
- Current team: Grêmio
- Number: 22

Youth career
- SGI
- 2003–2007: Esbjerg fB
- 2007: Midtjylland
- 2007–2009: Esbjerg fB

Senior career*
Years	Team	Apps	(Gls)
2009–2013	Esbjerg fB	89	(17)
2013–2017	Toulouse	136	(35)
2017–2019	Middlesbrough	36	(8)
2018	→ Bordeaux (loan)	14	(4)
2019	→ Leganés (loan)	19	(4)
2019–2020	Leganés	24	(6)
2020–2022	Barcelona	44	(5)
2022–2024	Espanyol	70	(32)
2024–	Grêmio	64	(20)

International career
2008	Denmark U17	3	(0)
2009–2010	Denmark U19	11	(2)
2012–2013	Denmark U21	2	(0)
2013–2023	Denmark	69	(10)
- * Club domestic league appearances and goals as of 09:32, 28 September 2026 (UTC)

Martin Christensen Braithwaite (/ˈbræθweɪt/; born 5 June 1991) is a Danish professional footballer who plays for Campeonato Brasileiro Série A club Grêmio. He plays mainly as a striker, but can also operate as a winger.

Having begun his career at Esbjerg fB, he went on to play for Toulouse and Bordeaux in Ligue 1, and Leganés, Barcelona and Espanyol of La Liga. He also spent two years in England with Middlesbrough.

Braithwaite made his senior international debut for Denmark in 2013 and has earned over 60 caps. He was part of their squads at the 2018 FIFA World Cup, UEFA Euro 2020 and 2022 FIFA World Cup, reaching the semi-finals of the 2020 tournament.

== Club career ==
=== Esbjerg fB ===
Braithwaite started out in the academy at Sædding-Guldager Idrætsforening (SGI), after which he joined the biggest club in his city, Esbjerg fB. He then spent a short time at FC Midtjylland's sports academy, before moving back to Esbjerg, signing a three-year youth contract in 2007. During his second stint at the Esbjerg academy, Braithwaite went on trials with both Reggina and Newcastle United. He eventually made his Esbjerg debut in 2009, making 63 Superliga appearances for the club and scoring 12 goals, including nine in the 2012–13 season during which he appeared in every league game for the club. He won the Danish Cup with the club in 2012–13, scoring two goals in the semi-final second leg win over Brøndby.

Following his impressive displays for Esbjerg in the 2013 Superliga spring season and the Danish Cup he was called up to the Danish national squad in the summer of 2013. At the same time he was being rumoured to be attracting the interest of a number of European clubs including Auxerre, Rennes, Celtic and Hull City.

=== Toulouse ===
On 14 August 2013, while away on national duty for a friendly international against Poland, Danish public broadcaster DR reported that Braithwaite had been sold to French club Toulouse for an estimated DKK 15 million (roughly €2 million).

Braithwaite scored a career-best 11 league goals in both 2015–16 and 2016–17. His tally for the latter campaign included two goals in a 4–1 home win over rivals Bordeaux in the Derby de la Garonne on 20 August 2016, and another two on 14 October in a 3–1 win over eventual champions Monaco, also at the Stadium de Toulouse.

=== Middlesbrough ===
On 13 July 2017, Braithwaite signed a four-year contract with EFL Championship club Middlesbrough for an undisclosed fee, reported to be around £9 million. Under the initial management of Garry Monk, he became the club's third signing of the season, after Jonny Howson and Cyrus Christie. Braithwaite made his league debut for the club on 5 August 2017 at the Molineux Stadium, where Middlesbrough were defeated 1–0 by Wolverhampton Wanderers. He scored his first goal for the club on 30 September 2017, in a 2–2 draw against Brentford at the Riverside Stadium.

Braithwaite was loaned out to his former club Toulouse's rivals Bordeaux on 31 January 2018 for the rest of the season. He scored four goals during his time there, including two in a 4–2 home derby win over his previous employer on 12 May. He returned to Middlesbrough for the 2018–19 season, but quickly expressed his desire to leave the club and go to Spain to play instead. This was much to the dismay of Boro manager, Tony Pulis. After his unsuccessful attempt to leave the club in the 2018 summer transfer window, Braithwaite played the first half of the season for Middlesbrough, scoring three goals in 18 appearances.

=== Leganés ===
Braithwaite joined La Liga team CD Leganés at the beginning of the 2019 January transfer window on a loan deal until the end of season. He made his league debut for the club on 12 January, in a 1–0 victory against SD Huesca, coming on as a substitute for Guido Carrillo for the last 26 minutes, and scored his first goal four days later in a 1–0 Copa del Rey home win against Real Madrid.

Braithwaite scored his first league goal in a 1–3 loss at FC Barcelona on 20 January 2019, and finished the campaign with four goals in 19 league appearances. On 24 July, he agreed to a permanent four-year deal with the Pepineros for a rumoured fee of €5 million, hence becoming the second most expensive player in the club's history.

=== Barcelona ===
On 20 February 2020, Barcelona triggered Braithwaite's release clause of €18 million and signed him on a four-and-a-half-year contract. His release clause was set to €300 million. Barcelona were granted an emergency exception to sign Braithwaite outside of a transfer window because of the long-term injury to Ousmane Dembélé. Two days after signing, Braithwaite made his debut in a home match against Eibar, coming on as a substitute in the 72nd minute. He assisted the fourth and fifth goals in the 5–0 win, both off deflections. On 13 June 2020, Braithwaite scored his first goal for Barcelona following an assist by Lionel Messi in a 4–0 victory against RCD Mallorca.

On 24 November 2020, Braithwaite scored his first two Champions League goals in a 4–0 away win over Dynamo Kyiv, a match in which he also had an assist, in the 2020–21 season. On 2 December, he scored his third goal in the competition in the first half of the match against Ferencváros. On 3 March 2021, he scored the winning goal in a 3–0 win over Sevilla after extra time to secure Barcelona's place in the 2021 Copa del Rey Final.

On 15 August 2021, Braithwaite scored a brace and assisted teammate Sergi Roberto's goal in Barcelona's opening-day match of the 2021–22 season; a 4–2 home win against Real Sociedad. The following month, he was ruled out for three to four months with a knee cartilage injury against Getafe CF; fellow attackers Dembélé, Ansu Fati and Sergio Agüero were already injured, while Messi had left and Antoine Griezmann was out on loan.

On 1 September 2022, Braithwaite terminated his contract with Barcelona effective immediately.

=== Espanyol ===
On 1 September 2022, Braithwaite signed a three-year contract with Espanyol as a free agent. On 4 September, he scored a goal on his debut in a 1–0 away victory over Athletic Bilbao. Following the club's relegation in the 2022–23 season, Braithwaite left the club's preseason camp in Marbella without any notice due to his wishes of not playing in the Segunda División and possibly considering retirement. In discussion of disciplinary action, Espanyol offered the forward to Osasuna with a potential exchange for Kike García. Braithwaite's representatives put in offers towards Ligue 1 clubs with Lens and Metz having their offers rejected for not meeting their terms. He eventually remained at the club, scoring 22 goals in the 2023–24 season, as top scorer of the second division. He left Espanyol on 15 July 2024 after executing a contract clause to terminate his contract unilaterally.

=== Grêmio ===
On 22 July 2024, Grêmio reached an agreement to sign Braithwaite. He arrived in Porto Alegre shortly after where he passed his medical examinations and signed a contract. There, he was seen as a replacement of Luis Suárez. He made his debut on 11 August in a 3–1 away victory against Cuiabá, in which he scored both an own goal and a brace.

== International career ==
Having already represented several Danish national youth teams, in the summer of 2012, Braithwaite was offered the chance to represent Guyana, being eligible through his Guyanese father. He declined the offer and went on to make his senior debut for the Danish national team in June 2013 in a friendly against Georgia, starting the game and playing the first half. He remained in the squad for the 2014 World Cup qualification match against Armenia. Braithwaite scored his first international goal in his second match in a friendly in August 2013 against Poland.

In May 2018, he was named in Denmark's final 23-man squad for the 2018 FIFA World Cup in Russia. On 16 October that year, he scored in a 2–0 friendly win over Austria, ending a five-year goal drought.

Braithwaite was part of the Danish squad that reached the semi-finals of UEFA Euro 2020, held in 2021. He scored the last goal of their 4–0 last-16 win over Wales in Amsterdam. On 7 November 2022, he was selected in the Danish squad for the 2022 FIFA World Cup in Qatar.

== Personal life ==
Braithwaite has a Guyanese father and his younger sister Mathilde (born 2002) played college football for the Hofstra Pride women's soccer team. His father Keith's birth surname was Brathwaite, the more common spelling in the Caribbean, but it was changed by US authorities to Braithwaite when Keith arrived in the country.

When Braithwaite was 5 years old he was diagnosed with Legg-Calve-Perthes disease.

Braithwaite is the nephew and business partner of the Danish-born, American-based, real estate developer Gareth Roger James Smith. They co-own real estate in the New York Market and are building a high-rise in Jersey City, New Jersey.

Braithwaite is married to French entrepreneur, journalist and television personality Anne-Laure Louis Braithwaite. They have two sons and a daughter together. He is also the stepfather of his wife's two children from a previous relationship.

== Career statistics ==
=== Club ===
As of match played 20 September 2026

Appearances and goals by club, season and competition
Club	Season	League			National cup (Note: Includes Danish Cup, Coupe de France, FA Cup, Copa del Rey, Copa do Brasil)		League cup (Note: Includes Coupe de la Ligue, EFL Cup)		Continental		Other		Total	
Club	Season	Division	Apps	Goals	Apps	Goals	Apps	Goals	Apps	Goals	Apps	Goals	Apps	Goals
Esbjerg fB	2009–10	Danish Superliga	10	0	0	0	—		—		—		10	0
Esbjerg fB	2010–11	Danish Superliga	16	0	2	0	—		—		—		18	0
Esbjerg fB	2011–12	Danish 1st Division	26	5	1	0	—		—		—		27	5
Esbjerg fB	2012–13	Danish Superliga	33	9	5	2	—		—		—		38	11
Esbjerg fB	2013–14	Danish Superliga	4	3	0	0	—		—		—		4	3
Esbjerg fB	Total		89	17	8	2	—		—		—		97	19
Toulouse	2013–14	Ligue 1	32	7	2	1	2	0	—		—		36	8
Toulouse	2014–15	Ligue 1	34	6	1	0	1	0	—		—		36	6
Toulouse	2015–16	Ligue 1	36	11	2	2	3	1	—		—		41	14
Toulouse	2016–17	Ligue 1	34	11	1	0	1	1	—		—		36	12
Toulouse	Total		136	35	6	3	7	2	—		—		149	40
Middlesbrough	2017–18	Championship	19	5	2	1	0	0	—		—		21	6
Middlesbrough	2018–19	Championship	17	3	0	0	2	0	—		—		19	3
Middlesbrough	Total		36	8	2	1	2	0	—		—		40	9
Bordeaux (loan)	2017–18	Ligue 1	14	4	0	0	0	0	—		—		14	4
Leganés (loan)	2018–19	La Liga	19	4	2	1	—		—		—		21	5
Leganés	2019–20	La Liga	24	6	3	2	—		—		—		27	8
Barcelona	2019–20	La Liga	11	1	0	0	—		—		—		11	1
Barcelona	2020–21	La Liga	29	2	5	2	—		6 (Note: Appearances in UEFA Champions League)	3	2 (Note: Appearances in Supercopa de España)	0	42	7
Barcelona	2021–22	La Liga	4	2	1	0	—		0	0	0	0	5	2
Barcelona	Total		44	5	6	2	—		6	3	2	0	58	10
Espanyol	2022–23	La Liga	31	10	2	0	—		—		—		33	10
Espanyol	2023–24	Segunda División	39	22	2	0	—		—		4 (Note: Appearances in Segunda División promotion play-offs)	0	45	22
Espanyol	Total		70	32	4	0	—		—		4	0	78	32
Grêmio	2024	Série A	18	8	0	0	—		2 (Note: Appearances in Copa Libertadores)	0	—		20	8
Grêmio	2025	Série A	18	6	4	2	—		4 (Note: Appearances in Copa Sudamericana)	1	9 (Note: Appearances in Campeonato Gaúcho)	6	35	15
Grêmio	2026	Série A	19	0	5	2	—		8	2	0	0	32	4
Grêmio	Total		55	14	9	4	—		14	3	9	6	87	27
Career total			487	125	40	15	9	2	20	6	15	6	571	154

=== International ===
Appearances and goals by national team and year
National team	Year	Apps	Goals
Denmark	2013	5	1
Denmark	2014	2	0
Denmark	2015	5	0
Denmark	2016	2	0
Denmark	2017	3	0
Denmark	2018	12	2
Denmark	2019	10	4
Denmark	2020	7	0
Denmark	2021	10	3
Denmark	2022	8	0
Denmark	2023	5	0
Total		69	10

Denmark's score listed first, score column indicates score after each Braithwaite goal.

List of international goals scored by Martin Braithwaite
No.	Date	Venue	Cap	Opponent	Score	Result	Competition
1	14 August 2013	PGE Arena Gdańsk, Gdańsk, Poland	2	Poland	2–1	2–3	Friendly
2	16 October 2018	MCH Arena, Herning, Denmark	27	Austria	2–0	2–0	Friendly
3	16 November 2018	Cardiff City Stadium, Cardiff, Wales	28	Wales	2–0	2–1	2018–19 UEFA Nations League B
4	10 June 2019	Parken Stadium, Copenhagen, Denmark	33	Georgia	5–1	5–1	UEFA Euro 2020 qualifying
5	15 October 2019	Aalborg Stadium, Aalborg, Denmark	37	Luxembourg	1–0	4–0	Friendly
6	15 November 2019	Parken Stadium, Copenhagen, Denmark	38	Gibraltar	3–0	6–0	UEFA Euro 2020 qualifying
7	18 November 2019	Aviva Stadium, Dublin, Ireland	39	Republic of Ireland	1–0	1–1	UEFA Euro 2020 qualifying
8	25 March 2021	Bloomfield Stadium, Tel Aviv, Israel	47	Israel	1–0	2–0	2022 FIFA World Cup qualification
9	6 June 2021	Brøndby Stadium, Brøndby, Denmark	50	Bosnia and Herzegovina	1–0	2–0	Friendly
10	26 June 2021	Johan Cruyff Arena, Amsterdam, Netherlands	54	Wales	4–0	4–0	UEFA Euro 2020

== Honours ==
Esbjerg fB

- Danish Cup: 2012–13
- Danish 1st Division: 2011–12

Barcelona

- Copa del Rey: 2020–21

Grêmio

- Campeonato Gaúcho: 2026
- Recopa Gaúcha: 2025

Individual

- Segunda División Player of the Month: February 2024
- Segunda División Top scorer: 2023–24
