= Jean-Daniel Akpa Akpro =

Footballer (born 1992)

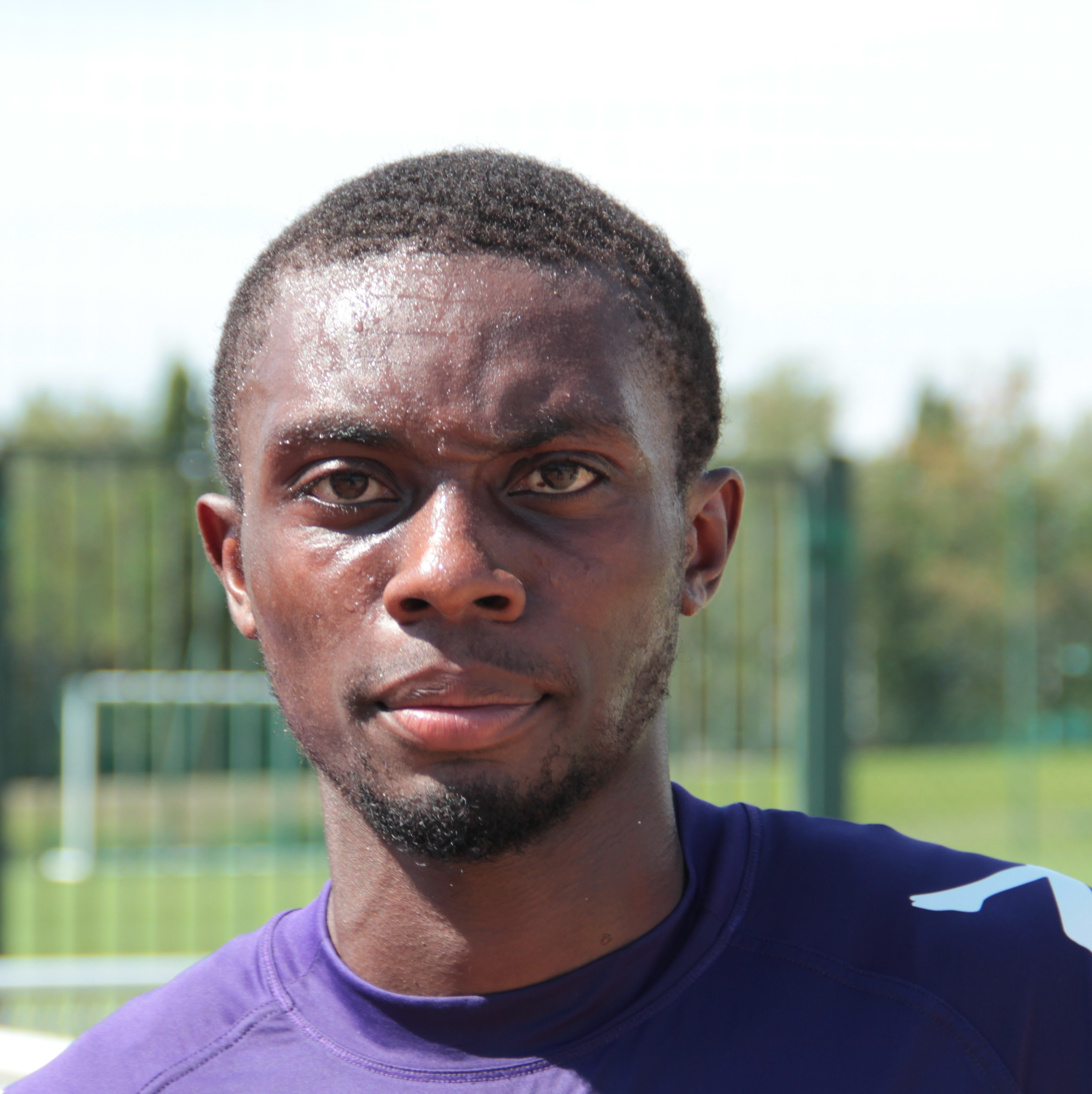
- Akpa Akpro in 2012

Personal information
- Full name: Jean-Daniel Dave Lewis Akpa Akpro
- Date of birth: 11 October 1992 (age 34)
- Place of birth: Toulouse, France
- Height: 1.80 m (5 ft 11 in)
- Position: Midfielder

Senior career*
Years	Team	Apps	(Gls)
2011–2017	Toulouse	121	(5)
2018–2020	Salernitana	58	(2)
2020–2025	Lazio	42	(0)
2022–2023	→ Empoli (loan)	24	(1)
2023–2024	→ Monza (loan)	19	(0)
2025	→ Monza (loan)	14	(0)
2025–2026	Hellas Verona	22	(1)

International career^{‡}
2014–2021	Ivory Coast	17	(0)
Medal record
Representing Ivory Coast
Men's football
Africa Cup of Nations
Winner	2015 Equatorial Guinea
- * Club domestic league appearances and goals as of 25 May 2026 ‡ National team caps and goals as of 6 September 2021

Jean-Daniel Dave Lewis Akpa Akpro (born 11 October 1992) is a professional footballer who plays as a midfielder. Born in France, he plays for the Ivory Coast national team.

== Club career ==
=== Toulouse ===
Akpa Akpro made his Ligue 1 debut with Toulouse during the 2011–12 season. On 18 April 2014, Akpa Akpro signed a new three-year deal with the le Téfécé side, keeping him contracted until June 2017.

=== Salernitana ===
On 14 February 2018, he was signed by Italian team Salernitana on a six-month contract.

=== Lazio ===
On 1 September 2020, Akpa Akpro joined Lazio on a two-year deal. He scored his first goal for the club on 20 October 2020, in a 3–1 Champions League victory over Borussia Dortmund.

==== Loans to Empoli and Monza ====
On 1 September 2022, Akpa Akpro was loaned to Empoli. On 26 August 2023, Akpa Akpro signed for Serie A side Monza on a one-year loan with an option for purchase. On 2 January 2025, he rejoined Monza on loan until 30 June 2025.

=== Hellas Verona ===
On 6 September 2025, Akpa Akpro signed a one-season contract with Hellas Verona.

== International career ==
From 2013, Akpa Akpro began to be called by Ivory Coast for official matches, making his debut in a 3–0 win against Gambia.

He represented the side at the 2014 FIFA World Cup.

== Personal life ==
Akpa Akpro's brothers Jean-Jacques and Jean-Louis are also both footballers.

== Career statistics ==
=== Club ===
As of match played 28 February 2026

Appearances and goals by club, season and competition
Club	Season	League			National cup		League cup		Europe		Other		Total	
Club	Season	Division	Apps	Goals	Apps	Goals	Apps	Goals	Apps	Goals	Apps	Goals	Apps	Goals
Toulouse	2011–12	Ligue 1	13	0	0	0	1	0	–		–		14	0
Toulouse	2012–13	Ligue 1	19	1	2	0	1	0	–		–		22	1
Toulouse	2013–14	Ligue 1	22	1	2	0	1	0	–		–		25	1
Toulouse	2014–15	Ligue 1	32	2	0	0	1	1	–		–		33	3
Toulouse	2015–16	Ligue 1	33	1	1	0	2	0	–		–		36	1
Toulouse	2016–17	Ligue 1	2	0	0	0	0	0	–		–		2	0
Toulouse	Total		121	5	5	0	6	1	–		–		132	6
Salernitana	2017–18	Serie B	5	0	0	0	–		–		–		5	0
Salernitana	2018–19	Serie B	22	0	0	0	–		–		1 (Note: Appearance(s) in Serie B relegation play-out)	0	23	0
Salernitana	2019–20	Serie B	31	2	2	0	–		–		–		33	2
Salernitana	Total		58	2	2	0	–		–		1	0	61	2
Lazio	2020–21	Serie A	32	0	2	0	–		8 (Note: Appearance(s) in UEFA Champions League)	1	–		42	1
Lazio	2021–22	Serie A	10	0	0	0	–		3 (Note: Appearance(s) in UEFA Europa League)	0	–		13	0
Lazio	Total		42	0	2	0	–		11	1	–		55	1
Empoli (loan)	2022–23	Serie A	24	1	0	0	–		–		–		24	1
Monza (loan)	2023–24	Serie A	19	0	0	0	–		–		–		19	0
Monza (loan)	2024–25	Serie A	14	0	0	0	–		–		–		14	0
Monza (loan)	Total		33	0	0	0	–		–		—		33	0
Hellas Verona	2025–26	Serie A	11	1	0	0	–		–		–		11	1
Career total			289	9	9	0	6	1	11	1	1	0	316	11

=== International ===
As of match played 6 September 2021

Appearances and goals by national team and year
National team	Year	Apps	Goals
Ivory Coast	2014	4	0
Ivory Coast	2015	7	0
Ivory Coast	2020	4	0
Ivory Coast	2021	2	0
Total		17	0
