= Jorge Rolando =

Uruguayan fencer

Personal information
- Born: 22 November 1906 Montevideo, Uruguay
- Died: 12 March 1971 (aged 64)

Sport
- Sport: Fencing

Jorge Rolando (22 November 1906 – 12 March 1971) was a Uruguayan fencer. He competed in the team sabre event at the 1936 Summer Olympics.
