= Aleksandar Pešić =

Serbian footballer (born 1992)

Aleksandar Pešić Александар Пешић
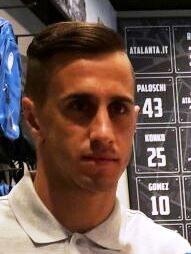
- Pešić in 2017

Personal information
- Date of birth: 21 May 1992 (age 34)
- Place of birth: Niš, FR Yugoslavia
- Height: 1.90 m (6 ft 3 in)
- Position: Forward

Team information
- Current team: Fatih Karagümrük
- Number: 72

Youth career
- Filip Filipović Niš
- Partizan
- Radnički Niš

Senior career*
Years	Team	Apps	(Gls)
2008	Radnički Niš	1	(0)
2008–2010	OFI	13	(1)
2011–2013	Sheriff Tiraspol	59	(25)
2013–2014	Jagodina	22	(13)
2014–2017	Toulouse	57	(8)
2016–2017	→ Atalanta (loan)	6	(0)
2017–2018	Red Star Belgrade	35	(25)
2018–2020	Al-Ittihad	11	(1)
2019–2020	→ FC Seoul (loan)	26	(10)
2020–2021	Maccabi Tel Aviv	23	(10)
2021–2022	Fatih Karagümrük	31	(14)
2022–2023	Red Star Belgrade	28	(11)
2023–2026	Ferencváros	49	(16)
2026–	Fatih Karagümrük	9	(5)

International career^{‡}
2010–2011	Serbia U19 (Note: Only official UEFA matches included.)	6	(0)
2013–2015	Serbia U21	16	(3)
2016	Serbia	1	(0)
- * Club domestic league appearances and goals as of 19 October 2026 ‡ National team caps and goals as of 21 February 2022

Aleksandar Pešić (Serbian Cyrillic: Александар Пешић; born 21 May 1992) is a Serbian professional footballer who plays as a forward for Turkish TFF 1. Lig club Fatih Karagümrük.

== Club career ==
=== Europe ===
Pešić made his senior debut with Radnički Niš on 24 May 2008, just three days after his 16th birthday. He came on as a late second-half substitute in a goalless draw with ČSK Čelarevo at home, thus breaking the record of Dejan Petković and becoming the youngest ever player in the club's history. However, the club suffered relegation from the Serbian First League at the end of the season after losing to Inđija in the playoffs.

In July 2008, Pešić moved abroad to Greece and signed for OFI on a three-year deal. He made one appearance in the 2008–09 Super League Greece, still aged 16, as the club suffered relegation from the top flight. In early 2011, Pešić joined the reigning Moldovan champions Sheriff Tiraspol. He helped them win back-to-back championship titles in 2012 and 2013. On 15 August 2013, Pešić left the club by mutual agreement.

On 30 August 2013, Pešić returned to his homeland and joined Jagodina. He netted a brace on his debut for the club on 14 September 2013, thus giving his side a 2–0 home league win over Spartak Subotica. On 4 December 2013, Pešić scored a hat-trick in a 4–1 Serbian Cup quarter-final victory over Donji Srem. He was the club's top scorer with 13 goals in the 2013–14 Serbian SuperLiga, being named in the competition's best eleven.

On 26 June 2015, Pešić officially signed a five-year contract with French club Toulouse. He scored six goals in Ligue 1 during his debut season, but only two in the next one. On 1 September 2016, it was announced that Pešić was transferred to Italian club Atalanta on a season-long loan.

On 4 July 2017, Pešić signed a three-year contract with Red Star Belgrade. He became the top goalscorer of the 2017–18 Serbian SuperLiga with 25 goals.

=== Asia ===
In July 2018, Pešić signed a three-year contract with Saudi Arabia club Al-Ittihad.

On 8 February 2019, Pešić was loaned to FC Seoul on a one-and-a-half-year contract.

=== Ferencváros ===
On 16 June 2023, he was signed by Nemzeti Bajnokság I club Ferencvárosi TC.

He scored his first goal against FK Žalgiris in the play-off of the 2023–24 UEFA Europa Conference League.

On 30 November 2023, he scored the winning goal against FK Čukarički on the fifth match day in the 2023–24 UEFA Europa Conference League match.

On 20 April 2024, the Ferencváros–Kisvárda tie ended with a goalless draw at the Groupama Aréna on the 29th match day of the 2023–24 Nemzeti Bajnokság I season which meant that Ferencváros won their 35th championship.

On 15 May 2024, Ferencváros were defeated by Paks 2–0 in the 2024 Magyar Kupa Final at the Puskás Aréna.

Pesic won the 2024–25 Nemzeti Bajnokság I season with Ferencváros after beating Győr 2–1 at the ETO Park on the last match day on 24 May 2025. On 9 May 2026, he won the 2025–26 Magyar Kupa season with Ferencváros by beating Zalaegerszegi TE 1–0 in the 2026 Magyar Kupa final at Puskás Aréna.

== International career ==
Pešić has represented Serbia under-19 at the 2011 UEFA European Under-19 Championship, where the team were eliminated in the semi-finals against the Czech Republic. He was also a member of the Serbia under-21 team at the 2015 UEFA European Under-21 Championship, as they finished bottom of their group.

On 15 November 2016, Pešić made his full international debut for the senior team, playing in a second half in a 2–0 friendly defeat against Ukraine.

== Career statistics ==
=== Club ===
As of match played 6 August 2025

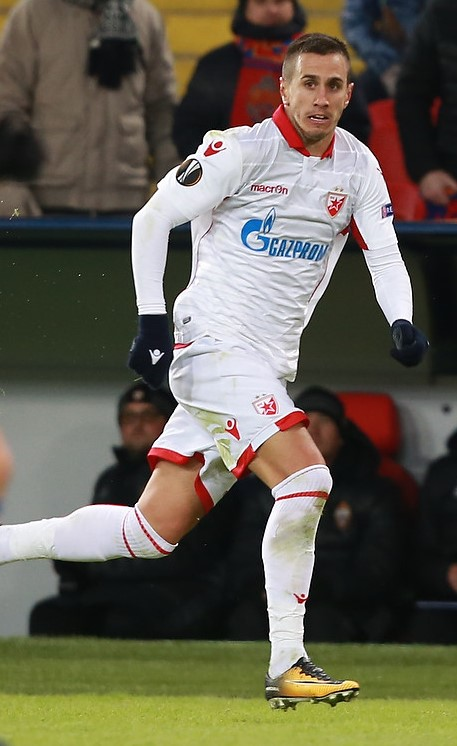
Pešić playing for Red Star Belgrade in the UEFA Europa League in 2018.

Appearances and goals by club, season and competition
Club	Season	League			National cup (Note: Includes Greek Cup, Moldovan Cup, Serbian Cup, Coupe de France, Coppa Italia, Korean FA Cup, Israel State Cup, Magyar Kupa)		League cup (Note: Includes Coupe de la Ligue)		Continental		Other		Total	
Club	Season	Division	Apps	Goals	Apps	Goals	Apps	Goals	Apps	Goals	Apps	Goals	Apps	Goals
Radnički Niš	2007–08	Serbian First League	1	0	0	0	—		—		—		1	0
OFI	2008–09	Super League Greece	1	0	1	0	—		—		—		2	0
OFI	2009–10	Beta Ethniki	12	1	0	0	—		—		—		12	1
OFI	Total		13	1	1	0	—		—		—		14	1
Sheriff Tiraspol	2010–11	Moldovan National Division	11	5	1	0	—		0	0	—		12	5
Sheriff Tiraspol	2011–12	Moldovan National Division	23	14	2	0	—		0	0	—		25	14
Sheriff Tiraspol	2012–13	Moldovan National Division	24	6	2	1	—		5 (Note: Three appearances in UEFA Champions League, two appearances in UEFA Europa League)	0	1 (Note: Appearance in Moldovan Super Cup)	0	32	7
Sheriff Tiraspol	2013–14	Moldovan National Division	1	0	0	0	—		3 (Note: Appearances in UEFA Champions League)	0	1	0	5	0
Sheriff Tiraspol	Total		59	25	5	1	—		8	0	2	0	74	26
Jagodina	2013–14	Serbian SuperLiga	22	13	5	4	—		—		—		27	17
Toulouse	2014–15	Ligue 1	34	6	1	0	1	0	—		—		36	6
Toulouse	2015–16	Ligue 1	23	2	2	0	4	0	—		—		29	2
Toulouse	Total		57	8	3	0	5	0	—		—		65	8
Atalanta (loan)	2016–17	Serie A	6	0	1	1	—		—		—		7	1
Red Star Belgrade	2017–18	Serbian SuperLiga	35	25	3	3	—		13 (Note: Appearances in UEFA Europa League)	1	—		51	29
Al-Ittihad	2018–19	Saudi Pro League	11	1	0	0	—		2 (Note: Appearances in AFC Champions League)	0	1 (Note: Appearance in Saudi Super Cup)	0	14	1
FC Seoul (loan)	2019	K League 1	25	10	1	0	—		—		—		26	10
FC Seoul (loan)	2020	K League 1	1	0	0	0	—		0	0	—		1	0
FC Seoul (loan)	Total		26	10	1	0	—		0	0	—		27	10
Maccabi Tel Aviv	2020–21	Israeli Premier League	23	10	2	0	0	0	6	1	—		31	11
Fatih Karagümrük	2021–22	Süper Lig	31	14	0	0	—		—		—		31	14
Red Star Belgrade	2022–23	Serbian SuperLiga	28	11	3	2	—		9 (Note: Three appearances and two goals in UEFA Champions League, six appearances and one goal in UEFA Europa League)	3	—		40	16
Ferencváros	2023–24	Nemzeti Bajnokság I	18	6	2	2	—		9 (Note: Appearances in UEFA Europa Conference League)	4	—		29	12
Ferencváros	2024–25	Nemzeti Bajnokság I	21	9	4	2	—		9 (Note: Two appearances in UEFA Champions League, seven appearances in UEFA Europa League)	0	—		34	11
Ferencváros	2025–26	Nemzeti Bajnokság I	1	0	0	0	—		2	1	—		3	1
Ferencváros	Total		40	15	6	4	—		20	5	—		66	24
Career total			352	133	30	15	5	0	57	10	3	0	448	158

=== International ===
Appearances and goals by national team and year
National team	Year	Apps	Goals
Serbia	2016	1	0
Total		1	0

== Honours ==
Sheriff Tiraspol

- Moldovan National Division: 2011–12, 2012–13
- Moldovan Super Cup: 2013

Red Star Belgrade

- Serbian SuperLiga: 2017–18, 2022–23
- Serbian Cup: 2022–23

Maccabi Tel Aviv

- Israel State Cup: 2020–21

Ferencvárosi TC

- Nemzeti Bajnokság I: 2023–24, 2024–25

Individual

- Serbian SuperLiga top scorer: 2017–18
- Serbian SuperLiga Player of the Season: 2017–18
- Serbian SuperLiga Team of the Season: 2013–14, 2017–18
- Serbian SuperLiga Player of the Week: 2022–23 (Round 16, Round 25)
- Serbian SuperLiga Player of the Month: October 2022
