= Olivier Sadran =

French businessman (born 1969)

- Born: 6 September 1969 (age 56); Colomiers, France
- Occupation: Businessman
- Known for: President of Toulouse FC (2001–2020)

Olivier Sadran (born 1969 in Toulouse) is a French businessman. He is president of the airline catering company Newrest, a group, that in 2018, was established in 49 countries and employs 32,000 people. In 2008 he entered the list of the 500 most wealthy people in France.

Olivier Sadran is best known for having been from 2001 to 2020 President of French football club Toulouse FC. Sadran took over the club following its bankruptcy, which resulted in the club being moved to the Championnat National. Under Sadran, Toulouse returned to Ligue 1 and later qualified for the UEFA Champions League for the 2007–08 season.
