= Dušan Veškovac =

Serbian footballer

Personal information
- Full name: Dušan Veškovac
- Date of birth: 16 March 1986 (age 40)
- Place of birth: Kruševac, SFR Yugoslavia
- Height: 1.87 m (6 ft 2 in)
- Position: Centre-back

Youth career
- Napredak Kruševac

Senior career*
Years	Team	Apps	(Gls)
2003–2004	Napredak Kruševac	11	(0)
2004–2005	Obilić	16	(0)
2005–2006	Borac Čačak	8	(0)
2006	Napredak Kruševac	8	(0)
2007	Wohlen	32	(0)
2008–2011	Luzern	91	(0)
2011–2013	Young Boys	59	(1)
2014–2017	Toulouse	28	(0)
2015–2016	→ Troyes (loan)	13	(0)
2017–2019	Napredak Kruševac	44	(0)
Total		310	(1)
- * Club domestic league appearances and goals

Dušan Veškovac (Serbian Cyrillic: Душан Вешковац; born 16 March 1986) is a retired Serbian professional footballer who played as a defender.

== Career ==
Veškovac started out at Napredak Kruševac, making his senior debuts in the 2003–04 First League of Serbia and Montenegro. He also played for Obilić and Borac Čačak, before moving abroad to Swiss Challenge League side Wohlen in the 2007 winter transfer window. While in Switzerland, Veškovac also represented two Super League clubs, namely Luzern and Young Boys, collecting 150 appearances in the top flight.

In January 2014, Veškovac was transferred to French club Toulouse on a three-and-a-half-year contract. He was loaned to newly promoted Ligue 1 side Troyes in August 2015.

In August 2017, Veškovac returned to his homeland and joined his parent club Napredak Kruševac on a free transfer. He retired at the end of 2019.
