= Adrien Regattin =

Moroccan footballer (born 1991)

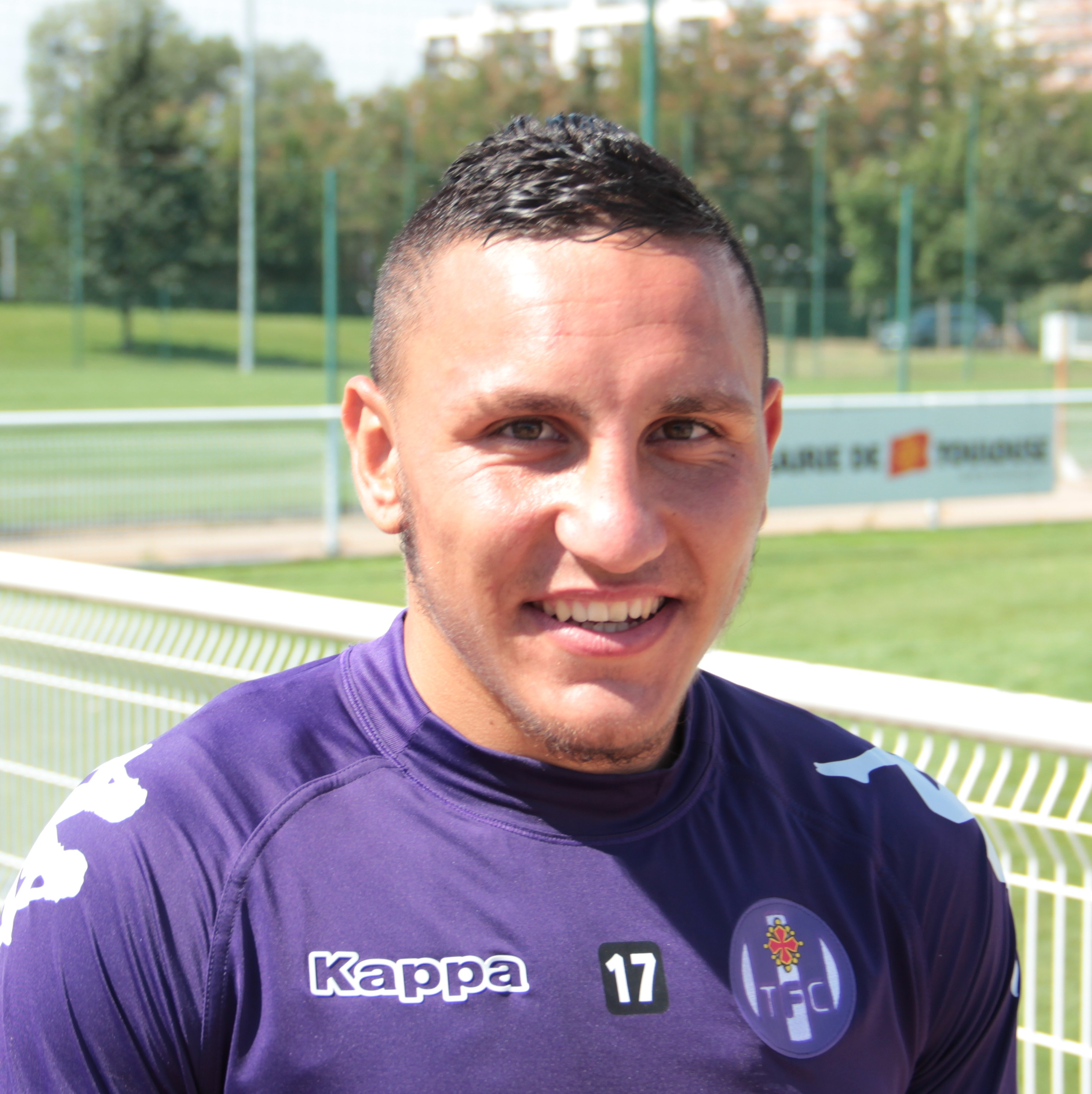
- Regattin with Toulouse in 2012

Personal information
- Full name: Adrien Daniel Karoly Regattin
- Date of birth: 22 August 1991 (age 35)
- Place of birth: Champigny-sur-Marne, France
- Height: 1.66 m (5 ft 5 in)
- Position: Midfielder

Team information
- Current team: Sarıyer
- Number: 7

Senior career*
Years	Team	Apps	(Gls)
2009–2016	Toulouse	128	(9)
2013–2014	→ Toulouse B	8	(2)
2016–2018	Osmanlıspor	61	(6)
2018–2019	Akhisarspor	23	(3)
2020	FC Cincinnati	10	(0)
2020–2021	Altay	30	(4)
2021–2022	Volos	29	(2)
2022–2023	Pendikspor	33	(12)
2023–2024	Eyüpspor	28	(7)
2024–2025	Iğdır	31	(11)
2025–	Sarıyer	21	(3)

International career^{‡}
2012	Morocco	1	(0)
- * Club domestic league appearances and goals as of 6 May 2026 ‡ National team caps and goals as of 23:08, 3 February 2020 (UTC)

Adrien Daniel Karoly Regattin (Arabic: ادريان ريجاتين; born 22 August 1991) is a professional footballer who plays for Turkish TFF 1. Lig club Sarıyer. Born in France, he made one appearance for the Morocco national team in 2012.

== Career ==
Regattin left Süper Lig club Akhisar Belediyespor after the 2018–19 season.

On 5 February 2020, Regattin joined MLS side Cincinnati. He parted with the club by mutual agreement in September 2020.

On 25 September 2020, Regattin joined Turkish club Altay.

On 29 July 2021, he joined Volos on a free transfer.

== Career statistics ==
As of 5 August 2021

Appearances and goals by club, season and competition
Club	Season	League			National cup		League cup		Continental		Other		Total	
Club	Season	Division	Apps	Goals	Apps	Goals	Apps	Goals	Apps	Goals	Apps	Goals	Apps	Goals
Toulouse	2009–10	Ligue 1	5	0	1	0	1	0	1	0	—		8	0
Toulouse	2010–11	Ligue 1	3	0	1	0	0	0	—		—		4	0
Toulouse	2011–12	Ligue 1	21	2	1	0	1	0	—		—		23	2
Toulouse	2012–13	Ligue 1	27	3	1	0	2	0	—		—		30	3
Toulouse	2013–14	Ligue 1	20	0	2	1	1	0	—		—		23	1
Toulouse	2014–15	Ligue 1	34	3	0	0	1	0	—		—		27	0
Toulouse	2015–16	Ligue 1	34	1	2	0	4	1	—		—		40	2
Toulouse	Total		144	9	8	1	10	1	1	0	—		163	11
Osmanlıspor	2016–17	Süper Lig	28	1	6	0	—		8	0	—		42	1
Osmanlıspor	2017–18	Süper Lig	30	3	5	3	—		—		—		35	6
Osmanlıspor	2018–19	TFF First League	3	2	—		—		—		—		4	2
Osmanlıspor	Total		61	6	11	3	—		8	0	—		80	9
Akhisarspor	2018–19	Süper Lig	23	3	8	2	—		5	0	—		36	5
Cincinnati	2020	MLS	10 (Note: Includes three appearances in the MLS is Back tournament group stage)	0	—		—		—		1 (Note: Appearance in the MLS is Back tournament Ro16)	0	11	0
Altay	2020–21	TFF First League	30	4	0	0	—		—		3	0	33	4
Career total			268	3	27	6	10	1	14	0	4	0	323	29
