= Maxime Spano =

French footballer (born 1994)

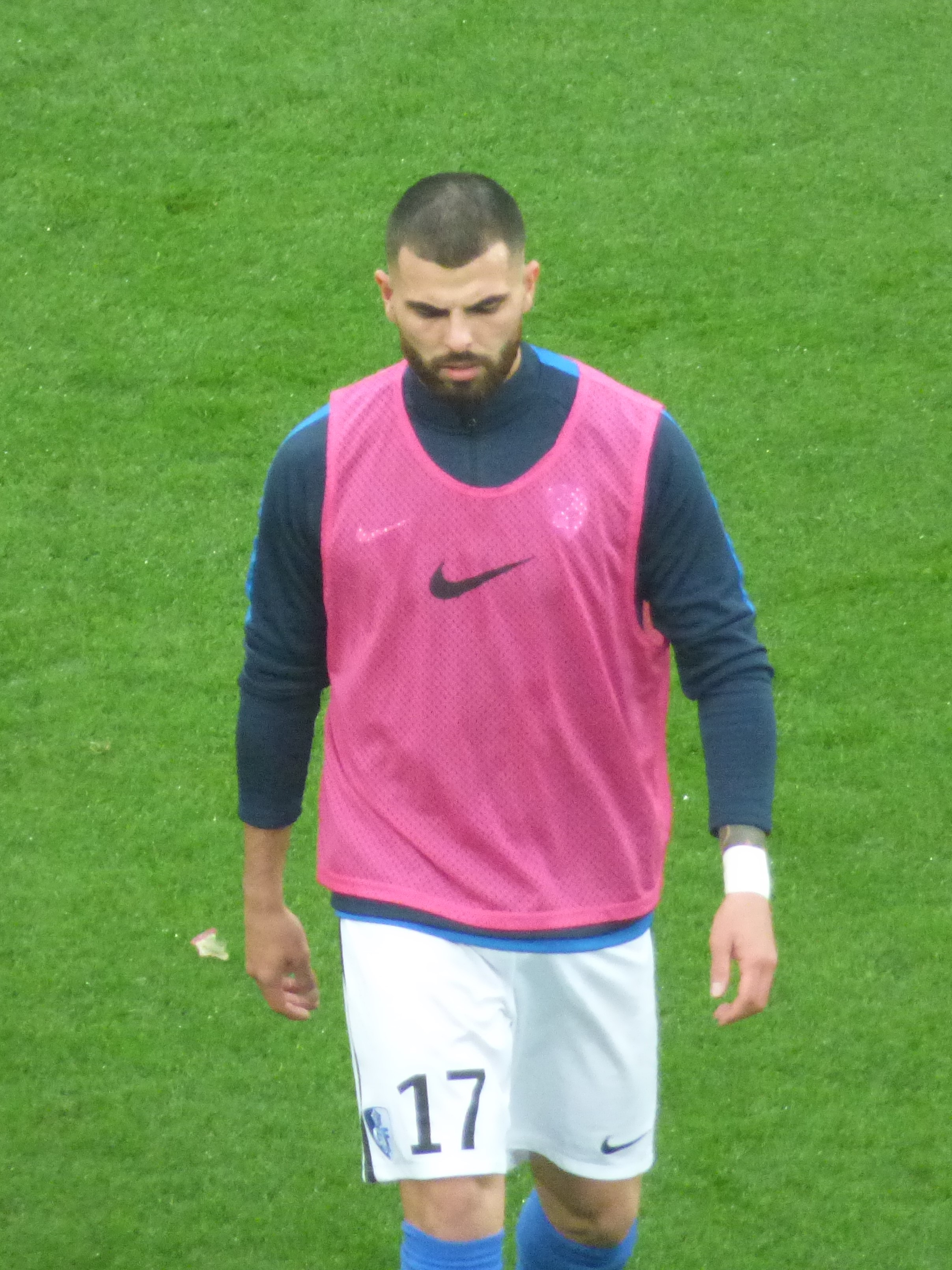
- Spano in 2018

Personal information
- Full name: Maxime Spano-Rahou
- Date of birth: 31 October 1994 (age 32)
- Place of birth: Aubagne, France
- Height: 1.84 m (6 ft 0 in)
- Position: Centre-back

Youth career
- –2014: ES Pennoise

Senior career*
Years	Team	Apps	(Gls)
2014–2016	Toulouse B	31	(0)
2014–2016	Toulouse	4	(0)
2016–2019	Grenoble	64	(3)
2019–2022	Valenciennes	58	(0)
2023–2024	FK Kauno Žalgiris	48	(1)
- * Club domestic league appearances and goals as of 5 December 2024

Maxime Spano-Rahou (Arabic: مكسيم سبانو رحو; born 31 October 1994) is a French professional footballer who plays as a centre-back.

== Club career ==
Spano-Rahou joined Toulouse FC in 2014 from ES Pennoise. He made his Ligue 1 debut at 24 October 2014 against RC Lens.

On 13 July 2016, Spano signed for French club Grenoble Foot 38.

== Personal life ==
Spano-Rahou was born in France to an Italian father and an Algerian mother, and opted to represent Algeria internationally. Spano is the twin brother of Romain Spano, who is also a professional footballer.
