= Yann Bodiger =

French footballer (born 1995)

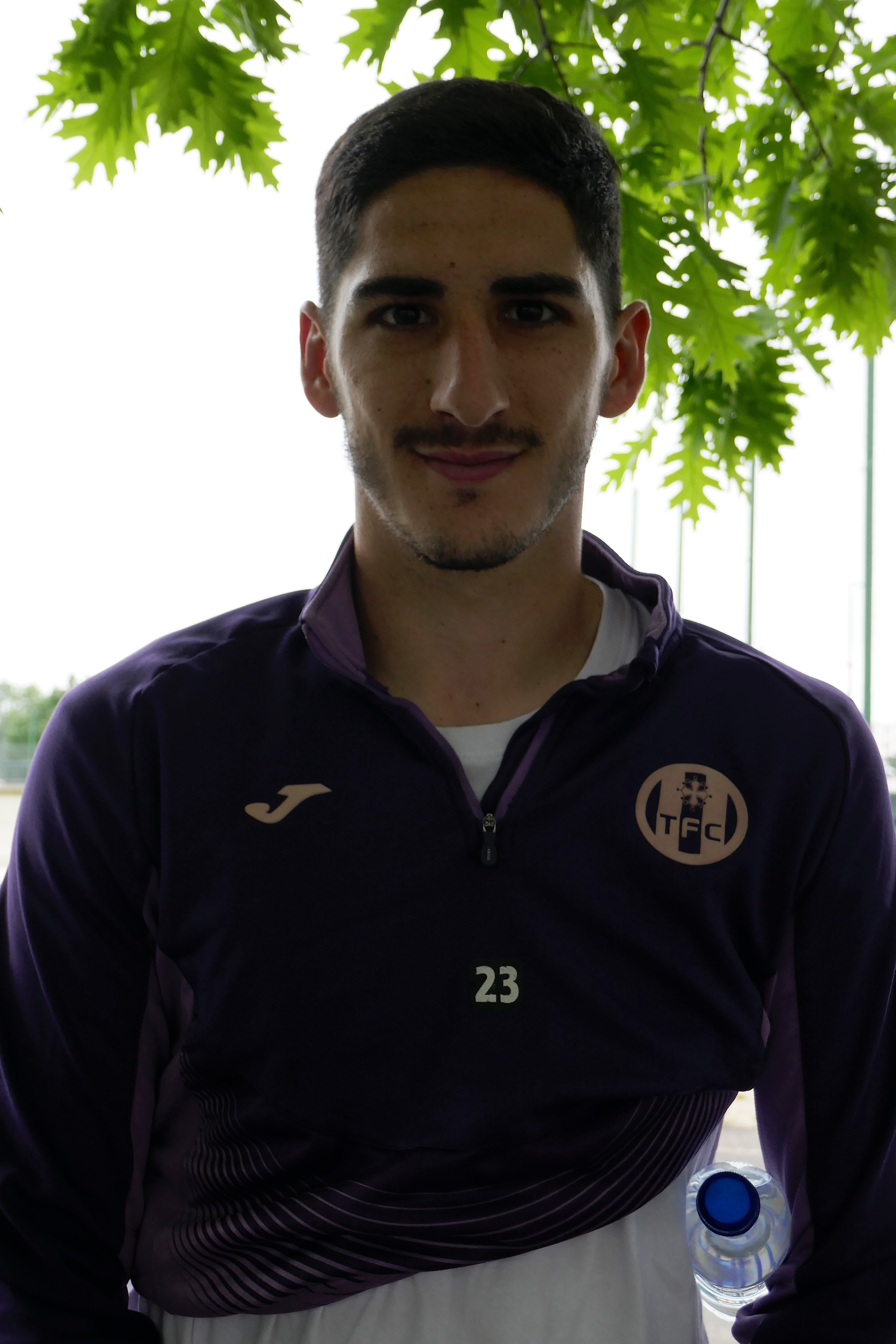
- Bodiger in 2018

Personal information
- Full name: Yann Yves Laurent Bodiger
- Date of birth: 9 February 1995 (age 31)
- Place of birth: Sète, Hérault, France
- Height: 1.88 m (6 ft 2 in)
- Position: Midfielder

Team information
- Current team: Ceuta
- Number: 14

Youth career
- 2001–2009: FC Sète
- 2009–2014: Toulouse

Senior career*
Years	Team	Apps	(Gls)
2012–2017	Toulouse B	39	(4)
2014–2019	Toulouse	80	(2)
2019	→ Córdoba (loan)	14	(0)
2019–2021	Cádiz	30	(0)
2021	Castellón	19	(1)
2021–2022	Cartagena	39	(4)
2022–2023	Granada	32	(0)
2023–2025	Tenerife	57	(1)
2025–	Ceuta	38	(1)

International career
2014–2015	France U20	7	(0)
2016	France U21	1	(0)
- * Club domestic league appearances and goals as of 9 June 2026

Yann Yves Laurent Bodiger (born 9 February 1995) is a French professional footballer who plays as a midfielder for Segunda División club AD Ceuta FC.

== Club career ==
Bodiger is a youth exponent from Toulouse. He made his Ligue 1 debut at 9 August 2014 against OGC Nice.

On 14 May 2016, the last match day of the 2015–16 season, Bodiger scored his first goal for the club in the 80th minute against Angers to win the match 3–2. His goal ensured that Toulouse remained in Ligue 1, finishing the season in 17th place with 40 points, just one point above the relegation zone.

In January 2019, Bodiger was loaned to Córdoba CF from Toulouse. On 15 July, he signed with fellow Segunda División side Cádiz CF on a two-year contract.

On 1 February 2021, Bodiger terminated his contract with the Yellow Submarine, and moved to second division side CD Castellón just hours later. After the latter's relegation, he agreed to a one-year deal with FC Cartagena.

On 21 June 2022, after being an undisputed starter for Cartagena, Bodiger signed a two-year contract with Granada CF, freshly relegated to the second level. He terminated his link with the club on 1 September 2023, and agreed to a three-year deal with CD Tenerife just hours later.

On 23 July 2025, after suffering relegation, Bodiger moved to AD Ceuta FC also in the Spanish second division.

== Career statistics ==
As of match played 20 July 2020

Club	Season	League		Cup		League Cup		Continental		Others		Total	
Club	Season	App	Goals	App	Goals	App	Goals	App	Goals	App	Goals	App	Goals
Toulouse	2014–15	10	0	0	0	0	0	—		—		10	0
Toulouse	2015–16	22	1	1	0	3	1	—		—		26	2
Toulouse	2016–17	29	1	1	0	2	0	—		—		32	1
Toulouse	2017–18	7	0	1	0	1	0	—		—		9	0
Toulouse	2018-19	12	0	0	0	1	0	—		—		13	0
Toulouse	Total	80	2	3	0	7	1	0	0	0	0	90	3
Córdoba (loan)	2018-19	14	0	0	0	—		—		—		14	0
Cádiz	2019-20	21	0	2	0	—		—		—		23	0
Career total		115	2	5	0	7	1	0	0	0	0	127	3

== Honours ==
Granada

- Segunda División: 2022–23
