= 2012–13 Toulouse FC season =

Toulouse
2012–13 season
- Chairman: Olivier Sadran
- Manager: Alain Casanova
- Stadium: Stadium Municipal
- Ligue 1: 10th
- Coupe de France: Round of 32
- Coupe de la Ligue: Round of 16
- Top goalscorer: League: Wissam Ben Yedder (15); All: Wissam Ben Yedder (15)
- Highest home attendance: 35,012 vs PSG (01 February 2013)
- Lowest home attendance: 10,431 vs AC Ajaccio (10 November 2012)
Home colours	Away colours	Third colours

The 2012–13 Toulouse FC season was the 43rd professional season of the club since its creation in 1970.

== Players ==
French teams are limited to four players without EU citizenship. Hence, the squad list includes only the principal nationality of each player; several non-European players on the squad have dual citizenship with an EU country. Also, players from the ACP countries—countries in Africa, the Caribbean, and the Pacific that are signatories to the Cotonou Agreement—are not counted against non-EU quotas due to the Kolpak ruling.

=== First team squad ===
As of 2 February 2016

Note: Flags indicate national team as defined under FIFA eligibility rules; some limited exceptions apply. Players may hold more than one non-FIFA nationality.

No.	Pos.	Nation	Player
1	GK	FRA	Marc Vidal
4	DF	CIV	Jean-Daniel Akpa Akpro
6	MF	FRA	Adrien Rabiot (on loan from Paris Saint-Germain)
7	FW	FRA	Wissam Ben Yedder
8	MF	FRA	Étienne Didot
9	FW	ISR	Eden Ben Basat
10	MF	FRA	Franck Tabanou
11	DF	FRA	Jonathan Zebina (captain)
12	DF	SEN	Cheikh M'Bengue
14	MF	FRA	Pantxi Sirieix
15	MF	FRA	Mickaël Firmin

No.	Pos.	Nation	Player
16	GK	FRA	Olivier Blondel
17	MF	MAR	Adrien Regattin
18	FW	FRA	Yannick Aguemon
19	DF	CIV	Serge Aurier
22	MF	MAR	Adil Hermach
23	DF	TUN	Aymen Abdennour
24	DF	SRB	Pavle Ninkov
25	FW	NOR	Daniel Braaten
27	FW	POR	Yannick Djaló
29	MF	FRA	Étienne Capoue
30	GK	COM	Ali Ahamada

=== Out on loan ===
Note: Flags indicate national team as defined under FIFA eligibility rules; some limited exceptions apply. Players may hold more than one non-FIFA nationality.

No. / Pos. / Nation / Player; — / FW / FRA / Amadou Soukouna (on loan to Luzenac)	No. / Pos. / Nation / Player; — / FW / TUR / Umut Bulut (on loan to Galatasaray)

== Transfers ==
=== Transfers in ===
Date	Pos.	Player	Age	Moved from	Fee	Notes
22 June 2012	GK	(France) Olivier Blondel	32	(France) Troyes	Undisclosed	
20 June 2012	MF	(France) Jonathan Zebina	33	(France) Brest	Undisclosed	
31 January 2013	FW	(Israel) Eden Ben Basat	26	(France) Brest	€500,000	

=== Loans in ===
Date	Pos.	Player	Age	Loaned from	Return date	Notes
31 August 2012	MF	(Portugal) Yannick Djaló	26	(Portugal) Benfica		
30 January 2013	MF	(Morocco) Adil Hermach	26	(Saudi Arabia) Al-Hilal	30 June 2013	
31 January 2013	MF	(France) Adrien Rabiot	17	(France) Paris Saint-Germain	30 June 2013	

=== Transfers out ===
Date	Pos.	Player	Age	Moved to	Fee	Notes
20 June 2012	DF	(France) Daniel Congré	27	(France) Montpellier	€5,000,000	
14 August 2012	MF	(Portugal) Paulo Machado	26	(Greece) Olympiacos	€2,700,000	
22 June 2012	GK	(France) Rémy Riou	24	(France) Nantes	Released	
21 January 2013	MF	(France) Moussa Sissoko	23	(England) Newcastle United	£1,500,000	
30 January 2013	FW	(France) Emmanuel Rivière	22	(France) Monaco	€4,000,000	
5 June 2012	DF	(Mali) Mohamed Fofana	27	(France) Reims	Released	
2 July 2012	FW	(France) Antoine Devaux	27	(France) Reims	Released	

=== Loans out ===
Date	Pos.	Player	Age	Loaned to	Return date	Notes
2 July 2012	FW	(France) Amadou Soukouna	20	(France) Luzenac	30 June 2013	
26 June 2012	FW	(Turkey) Umut Bulut	29	(Turkey) Galatasaray		

== Competitions ==
=== Ligue 1 ===
==== League table ====
Pos	Team	Pld	W	D	L	GF	GA	GD	Pts
8	Lorient	38	14	11	13	57	58	−1	53
9	Montpellier	38	15	7	16	54	51	+3	52
10	Toulouse	38	13	12	13	49	47	+2	51
11	Valenciennes	38	12	12	14	49	53	−4	48
12	Bastia	38	13	8	17	50	66	−16	47

Source: Ligue 1
Rules for classification: 1) points; 2) goal difference; 3) number of goals scored.

==== Results summary ====
Overall								Home						Away					
Pld	W	D	L	GF	GA	GD	Pts	W	D	L	GF	GA	GD	W	D	L	GF	GA	GD
38	13	12	13	49	47	+2	51	7	7	5	30	26	+4	6	5	8	19	21	−2

Last updated: 20 March 2016.
Source: Competitive matches

==== Results by match ====
Match	1	2	3	4	5	6	7	8	9	10	11	12	13	14	15	16	17	18	19	20	21	22	23	24	25	26	27	28	29	30	31	32	33	34	35	36	37	38
Ground	A	H	A	H	A	H	A	H	A	H	A	H	A	H	A	H	A	H	H	A	H	A	H	A	H	A	H	A	H	A	H	A	H	A	H	A	A	H
Result	D	W	W	D	L	D	W	D	W	W	L	L	L	W	L	D	L	L	W	D	W	D	L	L	D	D	D	W	D	W	L	L	L	D	W	L	W	W
Position	12	7	5	5	7	7	6	7	4	3	4	8	9	7	8	9	12	12	12	12	9	10	11	12	12	12	12	11	11	11	11	11	11	11	10	10	10	10

Source: Ligue1
A = Away; H = Home; W = Win; D = Draw; L = Loss

==== Matches ====
Win Draw Loss

10 August 2012 1	Montpellier	2–1	Toulouse	Montpellier
20:45 CET (UTC+02:00)	Camara 34'; Cabella (yellow card) 36'; Saihi (red card) 39'	Report	Abdennour (yellow card) 29'; Ben Yedder 72'; Regattin (red card) 73'; Aurier (red card) 84'	Stadium: Stade de la Mosson; Attendance: 19,788; Referee: Anthony Gautier

18 August 2012 2	Toulouse	2–1	Saint-Étienne	Toulouse
20:00 CEST (UTC+02:00)	Capoue 35'; Sissoko (yellow card) 40'; Ninkov (yellow card) 56'; Zebina (yellow card) 56'; Ben Yedder 89'	Report	Clément (yellow card) 26'; Ghoulam (yellow card) 30'; Mignot (yellow card) 59'; Gradel 90+2' (pen.)	Stadium: Stadium Municipal; Attendance: 13,176; Referee: Fredy Fautrel

25 August 2012 3	Nancy	0–1	Toulouse	Nancy
20:00 CEST (UTC+2)	André Luiz (red card) 48'; Sami (yellow card) 57'	Report	Sissoko 11'; Ninkov (yellow card) 44'; Tabanou (yellow card) 51'; Braaten (yellow card) 83'	Stadium: Stade Marcel Picot; Attendance: 13,158; Referee: Mikael Lesage

1 September 2012 4	Toulouse	1–1	Reims	Toulouse
20:00 CEST (UTC+02:00)	M'Bengue (yellow card) ?'; Ben Yedder 89'	Report	Fortes (yellow card) ?'; Abdennour 88' (o.g.); Fauvergue (yellow card) 70'	Stadium: Stadium Municipal; Attendance: 12,288; Referee: Benoît Millot

14 September 2012 5	Paris Saint-Germain	2–0	Toulouse	Paris
20:45 CET (UTC+02:00)	Verratti (yellow card) 36'; Pastore 38'; Ibrahimović 69'; Alex (yellow card) 59'; Chantôme (yellow card) 83'	Report		Stadium: Parc des Princes; Attendance: 43,298; Referee: Alexandre Castro

22 September 2012 6	Toulose	2–2	Rennes	Toulouse
20:00 CET (UTC+02:00)	Ben Yedder 24'; M'Bengue (yellow card) 72'; Ahamada 90+5'; Ahamada (yellow card) 90+6'	Report	Pitroipa 9'; Diallo (yellow card) 63'; Erdinç 65'; Théophile-Catherine (yellow card) 90+5'	Stadium: Stade Municipal; Attendance: 13,022; Referee: Wilfried Bien

29 September 2012 7	Troyes	0–2	Toulouse	Troyes
20:00 CET (UTC+02:00)	Camus (yellow card) 56'	Report	Ben Yedder 65'; Rivière 74'	Stadium: Stade de l'Aube; Attendance: 17,087; Referee: Ruddy Buquet

6 October 2012 8	Toulouse	2–2	Valenciennes	Toulouse
20:00 CEST (UTC+02:00)	Tabanou (yellow card) 17'; Ben Yedder 56'; Abdennour (yellow card) 72'; Regattin 90'	Report	Kadir 12'; Sánchez 15'; Kadir (yellow card) 43'; Angoua (yellow card) 74'	Stadium: Stadium Municipal; Attendance: 12,512; Referee: Jean-Charles Cailleux

20 October 2012 9	Evian	0–4	Toulouse	Annecy
20:00 CET (UTC+02:00)	Rabiu (yellow card) 28'	Report	Tabanou 24'; Rivière 40', 50'; Capoue (yellow card) 53'; Braaten (yellow card) 67', (goal) 86'; Zebina (yellow card) 69'	Stadium: Parc des Sports; Attendance: 8,831; Referee: Saïd Ennjimi

27 October 2012 10	Toulouse	3–1	Brest	Toulouse
20:00 CEST (UTC+02:00)	Ben Yedder 30'; Capoue 40'; Aurier (yellow card) 59'; Regattin 90+3'	Report	Chafni (yellow card) 61'; Lesoimier 75', (yellow card) 85'	Stadium: Stadium Municipal; Attendance: 31,188; Referee: Benoît Millot

4 November 2012 11	Bordeaux	1–0	Toulouse	Bordeaux
21:00 CEST (UTC+01:00)	Maurice-Belay (yellow card) 11'; N'Guemo (yellow card) 45+2'; Goufran 87'	Report	Akpa Akpro (yellow card) 14'; Capoue (yellow card) 70'; Ahamada (yellow card) 74'; M'Bengue (yellow card) 90+2'	Attendance: 17,975; Referee: Nicolas Rainville

10 November 2012 12	Toulouse	2–4	AC Ajaccio	Toulouse
20:00 CET (UTC+01:00)	Lippini 4' (o.g.); Tabanou (yellow card) 61'; Didot (yellow card) 69'; Abdennour 72'; Akpa Akpro (yellow card) 81'	Report	Sammaritano 72'; Belghazouani 34', 90+3'; Mostefa (yellow card) 38'; Faty (yellow card) 44'; Diarra 72'	Stadium: Stade Municipal; Attendance: 10,431; Referee: Bartolomeu Varela

18 November 2012 13	Nice	1–0	Toulouse	Nice
17:00 CET (UTC+01:00)	Cvitanich 60'; Genevois (yellow card) 75'; Eysseric (yellow card) 63'; Bosetti (yellow card) 87'; Ospina (yellow card) 90+3'	Report	Didot (yellow card) 63'	Stadium: Allianz Riviera; Attendance: 9,095; Referee: Tony Chapron

25 November 2012 14	Toulouse	3–0	AC Ajaccio	Toulouse
17:00 CET (UTC+01:00)	Ben Yedder 50', 87'; Capoue (yellow card) 69', (goal) 90+1'	Report	Umtiti (yellow card) 18'; Malbranque (yellow card) 30'; Gonalons (yellow card) 73'	Stadium: Stade Municipal; Attendance: 20,580; Referee: Philippe Kalt

2 December 2012 15	Lorient	1–0	Toulouse	Lorient
21:00 CET (UTC+01:00)	Corgnet 45'; Pedrinho (yellow card) 83'; Lautoa (yellow card) 90+3'	Report	Capoue (yellow card) 43'; Didot (yellow card) 84'	Stadium: Stade du Moustoir; Attendance: 13,343; Referee: Wilfried Bien

7 December 2012 16	Toulouse	0–0	Bastia	Toulouse
20:45 CET (UTC+01:00)	Sirieix (yellow card) 24'; M'Bengue (yellow card) 31'; Didot (yellow card) 44'	Report	Angoula (yellow card) 31'; Rothen (yellow card) 79'	Stadium: Stade Municipal; Attendance: 29,702; Referee: Ruddy Buquet

11 December 2012 17	Lille	2–0	Toulouse	Villeneuve-d'Ascq
21:00 CET (UTC+1)	Baša 55'; Payet (yellow card) 73', (goal) 83'; Roux (yellow card) 76'	Report	Akpa Akpro (yellow card) 33'; Zebina (yellow card) 37'	Stadium: Stade Pierre-Mauroy; Attendance: 35,264; Referee: Sébastien Moreira

15 December 2012 18	Toulouse	0–1	Marseille	Toulouse
17:00 CET (UTC+01:00)	M'Bengue (red card) 17'; Tabanou (yellow card) 40' (yellow-red card) 45'	Report	Gignac 68'; Fanni (yellow card) 79'; Barton (yellow card) 84'	Stadium: Stadium Municipal; Attendance: 22,101; Referee: Benoît Bastien

23 December 2012 19	Toulouse	2–0	Sochaux	Toulouse
17:00 CET (UTC+01:00)	Ben Yedder (yellow card) 19'; Regattin 26'; Rivière 85'	Report	Roussillon 25'; Nogueira (yellow card) 32'; Poujol (yellow card) 68'	Stadium: Stadium Municipal; Attendance: 16,401; Referee: Lionel Jaffredo

11 January 2013 20	Saint-Étienne	2–2	Toulouse	Saint-Étienne
19:00 CEST (UTC+01:00)	Perrin 26', (yellow card) 59'; Mollo 62'	Report	Zebina (yellow card) 20'; Didot 28'; Aurier 43'	Stadium: Stade Geoffroy-Guichard; Attendance: 18,410; Referee: Anthony Gautier

19 January 2013 21	Toulouse	2–1	Nancy	Toulouse
20:00 CET (UTC+01:00)	Tabanou 57', 78'	Report	Karaboué (yellow card) 55', (goal) 89'; Haïdara (yellow card) 66'	Stadium: Stadium Municipal; Attendance: 12,005; Referee: Sébastien Moreira

26 January 2013 22	Reims	1–1	Toulouse	Reims
20:00 CET (UTC+01:00)	Krychowiak (yellow card) 62', (goal) 74'	Report	Capoue (yellow card) 42', (goal) 56'; Didot (yellow card) 55'	Stadium: Stade Auguste Delaune; Attendance: 12,522; Referee: Olivier Thual

1 February 2013 23	Toulouse	0–4	Paris Saint-Germain	Toulouse
20:30 CET (UTC+01:00)	M'Bengue (yellow card) 27' (yellow-red card) 40'	Report	Pastore 4'; Ibrahimović 36'; Sakho 70'; Van der Wiel 73'	Stadium: Stadium Municipal; Attendance: 35,012; Referee: Tony Chapron

10 February 2013 24	Rennes	2–0	Toulouse	Rennes
17:00 CET (UTC+01:00)	Alessandrini 79'; Erdinç 84'	Report	Hermach (yellow card) 57'	Stadium: Roazhon Park; Attendance: 15,055; Referee: Saïd Ennjimi

16 February 2013 25	Toulouse	2–2	Troyes	Toulouse
20:00 CET (UTC+01:00)	Capoue (yellow card) 21'; Hermach (yellow card) 40'; Ben Basat 86'; Nivet 88' (o.g.)	Report	Bréchet (yellow card) 45+1'; Yattara 78'; Nivet 83'	Stadium: Stadium Municipal; Attendance: 12,005; Referee: Bartolomeu Varela

2 February 2013 26	Valenciennes	0–0	Toulouse	Valenciennes
20:00 CET (UTC+01:00)	Pujol 33'; Angoua (yellow card) 52'; Mater (yellow card) 87'	Report	Ben Basat (yellow card) 42'	Stadium: Stade du Hainaut; Attendance: 11,470; Referee: Benoît Millot

2 March 2013 27	Toulouse	0–0	Evian	Toulouse
20:00 CET (UTC+01:00)		Report	Sagbo (yellow card) 90'	Stadium: Stadium Municipal; Attendance: 11,011; Referee: Nicolas Rainville

9 March 2013 28	Brest	0–1	Toulouse	Brest
20:00 CET (UTC+01:00)	Kantari (yellow card) 44'	Report	M'Bengue (yellow card) 6'; Ben Basat (yellow card) 39'; Rabiot 45'; Capoue (yellow card) 71'	Stadium: Stade Francis-Le Blé; Attendance: 12,913; Referee: Wilfried Bien

17 March 2013 29	Toulouse	0–0	Bordeaux	Toulouse
17:00 CET (UTC+01:00)		Report	Saivet (yellow card) 90'	Stadium: Stadium Municipal; Attendance: 17,794; Referee: Jean-Charles Cailleux

30 March 2013 30	AC Ajaccio	2–3	Toulouse	Ajaccio
20:00 CET (UTC+01:00)	Zebina 18' (o.g.); Mutu 41'; Lasne (yellow card) 90+1'	Report	Capoue 25', 79' (pen.); Tabanou (yellow card) 32'; Zebina (yellow card) 73'; Abdennour (yellow card) 90+2'	Stadium: Stade François Coty; Attendance: 6,524; Referee: Philippe Kalt

6 April 2013 31	Toulouse	3–4	Nice	Toulouse
20:00 CET (UTC+02:00)	M'Bengue (yellow card) 6'; Ben Yedder 8', 90'; Rabiot (yellow card) 14'; Capoue 19'; Zebina (yellow card) 59'; Regattin (yellow card) 65'; Tabanou (yellow card) 70'; Ahamada (red card) 82'	Report	Bauthéac 1', 40'; Traoré (yellow card) 22'; Cvitanich 69'; Kolodziejczak (yellow card) 72'; Bosetti (red card) 90+2'; Anin 90+3'	Stadium: Stadium Municipal; Attendance: 11,191; Referee: Clément Turpin

14 April 2013 32	Lyon	3–1	Toulouse	Lyon
17:00 CET (UTC+02:00)	Grenier 8'; Koné 49'; Gomis 63'; Vercoutre (yellow card) 84'	Report	Ben Yedder 28'; Regattin (yellow card) 83'	Stadium: Stade de Gerland; Attendance: 34,678; Referee: Nicolas Rainville

21 April 2013 33	Toulouse	0–1	Lorient	Toulouse
17:00 CET (UTC+02:00)	Ninkov (yellow card) 25'	Report	Aliadière 77'	Stadium: Stadium Municipal; Attendance: 29,597; Referee: Amaury Delerue

27 April 2013 34	Bastia	0–0	Toulouse	Furiani
20:00 CET (UTC+02:00)		Report	Tabanou (yellow card) 33'; Abdennour (yellow card) 65'	Stadium: Stade Armand Cesari; Attendance: 13,130; Referee: Fredy Fautrel

4 May 2013 35	Toulouse	4–2	Lille	Toulouse
20:00 CET (UTC+02:00)	Ben Yedder 20'; Didot 32'; Hermach (yellow card) 37'; Braaten 56'; Aurier (yellow card) 75'; Ben Basat 89'	Report	Baša 38'; Kalou 48'	Stadium: Stadium Municipal; Attendance: 14,202; Referee: Tony Chapron

11 May 2013 36	Marseille	2–1	Toulouse	Marseille
17:00 CET (UTC+01:00)	A. Ayew 45', 62'; Amalfitano (yellow card) 49'; Romao (yellow card) 90'	Report	Aurier (yellow card) 41'; Abdennour (yellow card) 58'; Ben Basat 83'	Stadium: Stade Vélodrome; Attendance: 34,666; Referee: Saïd Ennjimi

18 May 2013 37	Sochaux	1–2	Toulouse	Montbéliard
21:00 CET (UTC+01:00)	Dias (yellow card) 42'; Sio 42'; Kanté (yellow card) 78'	Report	Sylla 14'; Akpa Akpro 21'; Abdennour (yellow card) 23'; Capoue (yellow card) 40' (yellow-red card) 76'; Aurier (yellow card) 83'	Stadium: Stade Auguste Bonal; Attendance: 18,505; Referee: Bartolomeu Varela

26 May 2013 38	Toulouse	2–0	Montpellier	Toulouse
21:00 CET (UTC+01:00)	Ben Yedder 5', 11'; Akpa Akpro (yellow card) 85'	Report	Pitau (yellow card) 88'; Congré (yellow card) 89'	Stadium: Stadium Municipal; Attendance: 12,812; Referee: Mikael Lesage

=== Coupe de la Ligue ===
26 September 2012 Round of 32	Caen	0–1	Toulouse	Caen
20:55 CET (UTC+02:00)	Montaroup (yellow card) 77'	Report	Djaló 84'	Stadium: Stade Michel d'Ornano; Attendance: 4,333; Referee: Benoît Bastien

30 December 2012 Round of 16	Lille	1–0 (a.e.t.)	Toulouse	Villeneuve-d'Ascq
20:50 CET (UTC+01:00)	Béria (yellow card) 64'; Roux 117'	Report	Sirieix (yellow card) 48'; Yago (yellow card) 59' (yellow-red card) 87'; Akpa Akpro (yellow card) 65'	Stadium: Stade Pierre-Mauroy; Attendance: 21,655; Referee: Laurent Duhamel

=== Coupe de France ===
5 January 2013 Round of 64	Boulogne	0–1	Toulouse	Boulogne-sur-Mer
18:00 CET (UTC+01:00)		Report	Rivière 59'	Stadium: Stade de la Libération; Attendance: 3,108

23 January 2013 Round of 32	Paris Saint-Germain	3–1	Toulouse	Paris
20:55 CET (UTC+01:00)	Gameiro 8'; Pastore 48'; Lavezzi 66'	Report	Tabanou 18'; Ninkov (yellow card) 64'; Regattin (yellow card) 89'	Stadium: Parc des Princes; Attendance: 32,867
