= 2008–09 Toulouse FC season =

Toulouse FC
2008–09 season
- President: Olivier Sadran
- Head coach: Alain Casanova
- Stadium: Stadium de Toulouse
- Ligue 1: 4th
- Coupe de France: Semi-finals
- Coupe de la Ligue: Third round
- Top goalscorer: League: André-Pierre Gignac (24); All: André-Pierre Gignac (24)
Home colours	Away colours	Third colours

The 2008–09 season was the 72nd season in the existence of Toulouse FC and the club's 6th consecutive season in the top flight of French football. They participated in the Ligue 1, the Coupe de France and Coupe de la Ligue.

== Players ==
=== First-team squad ===
Note: Flags indicate national team as defined under FIFA eligibility rules; some limited exceptions apply. Players may hold more than one non-FIFA nationality.

No.	Pos.	Nation	Player
1	GK	FRA	Sébastien Hamel
2	DF	FRA	Mohamed Fofana
3	DF	FRA	Daniel Congré
4	DF	ARG	Mauro Cetto (captain)
5	DF	FRA	Jérémy Mathieu
7	FW	GUI	Fodé Mansaré
8	MF	FRA	Étienne Didot
9	FW	DEN	Søren Larsen
10	FW	FRA	Bryan Bergougnoux
11	FW	FRA	André-Pierre Gignac
12	DF	FRA	Cheikh M'Bengue
14	MF	FRA	Pantxi Sirieix

No.	Pos.	Nation	Player
15	MF	BRA	Paulo César
16	GK	FRA	Cédric Carrasso
17	MF	FRA	Alexandre Bonnet
19	FW	FRA	Xavier Pentecôte
20	MF	FRA	Mathieu Berson
22	MF	FRA	Moussa Sissoko
23	DF	FRA	Albin Ebondo
25	MF	NOR	Daniel Braaten
27	MF	FRA	Franck Tabanou
28	FW	FRA	Ahmed Soukouna
29	MF	FRA	Étienne Capoue
30	GK	FRA	Olivier Blondel

=== Out on loan ===
Note: Flags indicate national team as defined under FIFA eligibility rules; some limited exceptions apply. Players may hold more than one non-FIFA nationality.

No.	Pos.	Nation	Player
—	DF	BRA	Eduardo Ratinho (at Fluminense)
—	DF	COD	Hérita Ilunga (at West Ham United)
21	FW	CZE	Pavel Fořt (at Slavia Prague)

== Pre-season and friendlies ==
Win Draw Loss

== Competitions ==
=== Overview ===
Competition	First match	Last match	Starting round	Final position	Record							
Competition	First match	Last match	Starting round	Final position	Pld	W	D	L	GF	GA	GD	Win %
Ligue 1	10 August 2008	30 May 2009	Matchday 1	4th	38	16	16	6	45	27	+18	42.11
Coupe de France	3 January 2009	22 April 2009	Round of 64	Semi-finals	5	2	2	1	12	3	+9	40.00
Coupe de la Ligue	23 September 2008		Round of 32	Round of 32	1	0	1	0	1	1	+0	0.00
Total					44	18	19	7	58	31	+27	40.91

Source: Competitions

=== Ligue 1 ===
==== League table ====
Pos	Team	Pld	W	D	L	GF	GA	GD	Pts	Qualification or relegation
2	Marseille	38	22	11	5	67	35	+32	77	Qualification to Champions League group stage
3	Lyon	38	20	11	7	52	29	+23	71	Qualification to Champions League play-off round
4	Toulouse	38	16	16	6	45	27	+18	64	Qualification to Europa League play-off round
5	Lille	38	17	13	8	51	39	+12	64	Qualification to Europa League third qualifying round
6	Paris Saint-Germain	38	19	7	12	49	38	+11	64	

Source: Ligue 1
Rules for classification: 1) points; 2) goal difference; 3) number of goals scored.
France's third UEFA Europa League spot went to Ligue 2 side Guingamp, winners of 2008–09 Coupe de France.

==== Results summary ====
Overall								Home						Away					
Pld	W	D	L	GF	GA	GD	Pts	W	D	L	GF	GA	GD	W	D	L	GF	GA	GD
38	16	16	6	45	27	+18	64	10	8	1	26	8	+18	6	8	5	19	19	0

Source: Ligue 1

==== Results by round ====
Round	1	2	3	4	5	6	7	8	9	10	11	12	13	14	15	16	17	18	19	20	21	22	23	24	25	26	27	28	29	30	31	32	33	34	35	36	37	38
Ground	A	H	A	H	A	H	A	H	A	H	A	H	A	H	A	H	A	H	H	A	H	A	H	A	H	A	H	A	A	A	H	A	H	A	H	A	A	H
Result	L	W	D	D	W	W	W	W	L	D	W	L	D	W	L	D	D	W	D	W	W	D	W	W	D	D	W	L	W	D	W	L	D	D	D	D	W	D
Position	20	14	13	13	8	3	2	2	5	5	3	4	6	5	7	7	7	6	7	5	5	6	5	4	4	5	4	5	4	6	4	5	5	5	5	5	4	4

Source: Ligue 1
A = Away; H = Home; W = Win; D = Draw; L = Loss

==== Matches ====
10 August 2008 1	Lyon	3–0	Toulouse	Lyon
21:00 CEST (UTC+2)				Stadium: Stade de Gerland

16 August 2008 2	Toulouse	2–1	Le Havre	Toulouse
19:00 CEST (UTC+2)				Stadium: Stadium de Toulouse

23 August 2008 3	Nancy	0–0	Toulouse	Tomblaine
19:00 CEST (UTC+2)				Stadium: Stade Marcel Picot

31 August 2008 4	Toulouse	0–0	Rennes	Toulouse
17:00 CEST (UTC+2)				Stadium: Stadium de Toulouse

13 September 2008 5	Le Mans	1–2	Toulouse	Le Mans
19:00 CEST (UTC+2)				Stadium: Stade Léon-Bollée

20 September 2008 6	Toulouse	2–1	Sochaux	Toulouse
19:00 CEST (UTC+2)				Stadium: Stadium de Toulouse

28 September 2008 7	Valenciennes	0–1	Toulouse	Valenciennes
17:00 CEST (UTC+2)				Stadium: Stade Nungesser

4 October 2008 8	Toulouse	1–0	Auxerre	Toulouse
19:00 CEST (UTC+2)				Stadium: Stadium de Toulouse

18 October 2008 9	Bordeaux	2–1	Toulouse	Bordeaux
19:00 CEST (UTC+2)				Stadium: Stade Chaban-Delmas

25 October 2008 10	Toulouse	0–0	Monaco	Toulouse
21:00 CEST (UTC+2)				Stadium: Stadium de Toulouse

29 October 2008 11	Paris Saint-Germain	0–1	Toulouse	Paris
19:00 CEST (UTC+2)				Stadium: Parc des Princes

1 November 2008 12	Toulouse	0–1	Caen	Toulouse
19:00 CET (UTC+1)				Stadium: Stadium de Toulouse

8 November 2008 13	Nantes	1–1	Toulouse	Nantes
21:00 CET (UTC+1)				Stadium: Stade de la Beaujoire

15 November 2008 14	Toulouse	2–0	Grenoble	Toulouse
19:00 CET (UTC+1)				Stadium: Stadium de Toulouse

22 November 2008 15	Lorient	1–0	Toulouse	Lorient
21:00 CET (UTC+1)				Stadium: Stade du Moustoir

30 November 2008 16	Toulouse	0–0	Marseille	Toulouse
17:00 CET (UTC+1)				Stadium: Stadium de Toulouse

6 December 2008 17	Lille	1–1	Toulouse	Lille
19:00 CET (UTC+1)				Stadium: Stadium Lille Métropole

13 December 2008 18	Toulouse	3–1	Saint-Étienne	Toulouse
19:00 CET (UTC+1)				Stadium: Stadium de Toulouse

20 December 2008 19	Toulouse	2–2	Nice	Toulouse
19:00 CET (UTC+1)				Stadium: Stadium de Toulouse

10 January 2009 20	Le Havre	0–1	Toulouse	Le Havre
21:00 CET (UTC+1)				Stadium: Stade Jules Deschaseaux

17 January 2009 21	Toulouse	3–0	Nancy	Toulouse
19:00 CET (UTC+1)				Stadium: Stadium de Toulouse

31 January 2009 22	Rennes	0–0	Toulouse	Rennes
21:00 CET (UTC+1)				Stadium: Stade de la Route de Lorient

7 February 2009 23	Toulouse	2–0	Le Mans	Toulouse
19:00 CET (UTC+1)				Stadium: Stadium de Toulouse

15 February 2009 24	Sochaux	1–2	Toulouse	Montbéliard
17:00 CET (UTC+1)				Stadium: Stade Auguste Bonal

21 February 2009 25	Toulouse	0–0	Valenciennes	Toulouse
19:00 CET (UTC+1)				Stadium: Stadium de Toulouse

28 February 2009 26	Auxerre	1–1	Toulouse	Auxerre
21:00 CET (UTC+1)				Stadium: Stade de l'Abbé-Deschamps

7 March 2009 27	Toulouse	3–0	Bordeaux	Toulouse
19:00 CET (UTC+1)				Stadium: Stadium de Toulouse

14 March 2009 28	Monaco	3–2	Toulouse	Monaco
19:00 CET (UTC+1)				Stadium: Stade Louis II

22 March 2009 29	Toulouse	4–1	Paris Saint-Germain	Toulouse
21:00 CET (UTC+1)				Stadium: Stadium de Toulouse

4 April 2009 30	Caen	0–0	Toulouse	Caen
21:00 CEST (UTC+2)				Stadium: Stade Michel d'Ornano

11 April 2009 31	Toulouse	1–0	Nantes	Toulouse
19:00 CET (UTC+1)				Stadium: Stadium de Toulouse

18 April 2009 32	Grenoble	1–0	Toulouse	Grenoble
19:00 CEST (UTC+2)				Stadium: Stade des Alpes

26 April 2009 33	Toulouse	1–1	Lorient	Toulouse
17:00 CEST (UTC+2)				Stadium: Stadium de Toulouse

2 May 2009 34	Marseille	2–2	Toulouse	Marseille
21:00 CEST (UTC+2)				Stadium: Stade Vélodrome

13 May 2009 35	Toulouse	0–0	Lille	Toulouse
19:00 CEST (UTC+2)				Stadium: Stadium de Toulouse

16 May 2009 36	Saint-Étienne	2–2	Toulouse	Saint-Étienne
19:00 CEST (UTC+2)				Stadium: Stade Geoffroy-Guichard

23 May 2009 37	Nice	0–2	Toulouse	Nice
21:00 CEST (UTC+2)				Stadium: Stade du Ray

30 May 2009 38	Toulouse	0–0	Lyon	Toulouse
21:00 CEST (UTC+2)				Stadium: Stadium de Toulouse

=== Coupe de France ===
3 January 2009 Round of 64	Toulouse	0–0 (a.e.t.) (5–4 p)	Valenciennes	Toulouse
21:00 CET (UTC+1)				Stadium: Stadium de Toulouse; Attendance: 4,646; Referee: Philippe Malige

24 January 2009 Round of 32	Schirrhein	0–8	Toulouse	Haguenau
15:00 CET (UTC+1)				Stadium: Parc des Sports; Attendance: 8,500; Referee: Alexandre Castro

3 March 2009 Round of 16	Boulogne	0–2	Toulouse	Boulogne-sur-Mer
20:45 CET (UTC+1)				Stadium: Stade de la Libération; Attendance: 5,021; Referee: Éric Poulat

17 March 2009 Quarter-finals	Toulouse	1–1 (a.e.t.) (7–6 p)	Lille	Toulouse
20:45 CET (UTC+1)				Stadium: Stadium de Toulouse; Attendance: 18,303; Referee: Tony Chapron

22 April 2009 Semi-finals	Toulouse	1–2	Guingamp	Toulouse
20:45 CEST (UTC+2)				Stadium: Stadium de Toulouse; Attendance: 30,755; Referee: Éric Poulat

=== Coupe de la Ligue ===
23 September 2008 Third round	Auxerre	1–1 (a.e.t.) (6–5 p)	Toulouse	Auxerre
21:00 CEST (UTC+2)				Stadium: Stade de l'Abbé-Deschamps; Attendance: 7,917; Referee: Fredy Fautrel
