= Étienne Capoue =

French footballer (born 1988)

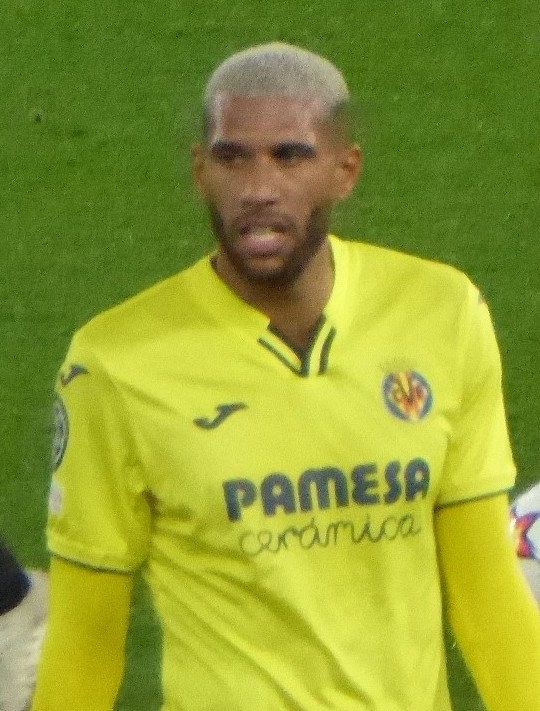
- Capoue playing for Villarreal in 2021

Personal information
- Full name: Étienne René Capoue
- Date of birth: 11 July 1988 (age 38)
- Place of birth: Niort, France
- Height: 1.89 m (6 ft 2 in)
- Position: Defensive midfielder

Youth career
- 1995–2002: Chamois Niortais
- 2002–2004: Chauray
- 2004–2005: Angers
- 2005–2007: Toulouse

Senior career*
Years	Team	Apps	(Gls)
2007–2013	Toulouse	174	(13)
2013–2015	Tottenham Hotspur	24	(1)
2015–2021	Watford	167	(9)
2021–2024	Villarreal	106	(6)
Total		471	(29)

International career
2007	France U19	2	(0)
2008–2010	France U21	13	(0)
2012–2013	France	7	(1)
- * Club domestic league appearances and goals

Étienne René Capoue (born 11 July 1988) is a French former professional footballer who played as a defensive midfielder.

He began his professional career at Toulouse, making 196 total appearances and scoring 13 goals, while making the UNFP Ligue 1 Team of the Year for 2011–12. From 2013 to 2020 he played in England's Premier League with Tottenham Hotspur and Watford, reaching the 2019 FA Cup Final with the latter. He then joined Villarreal, winning the UEFA Europa League in his first season, and was man of the match in the final.

Capoue was a French youth international, having earned caps at under-18, under-19, and under-21 level, serving as captain for a portion of his stint with the latter team. He earned seven senior caps from 2012 to 2013, scoring once.

== Club career ==
=== Early career ===
Capoue was born in the commune of Niort in Deux-Sèvres, and began his career playing for hometown club Chamois Niortais. In 2002, he departed the club and joined FC Chauray, a local club in Poitou-Charentes. Capoue stayed at the club for two years before joining Angers SCO in Pays de la Loire. While playing in a youth league match against Toulouse, Capoue drew the attention of the club's scouts who offered the player a one-week trial. Prior to agreeing to the internship, he was also approached by Lille, Auxerre, and Bordeaux. Capoue chose Toulouse because of the club's training facilities and the good weather.

=== Toulouse ===
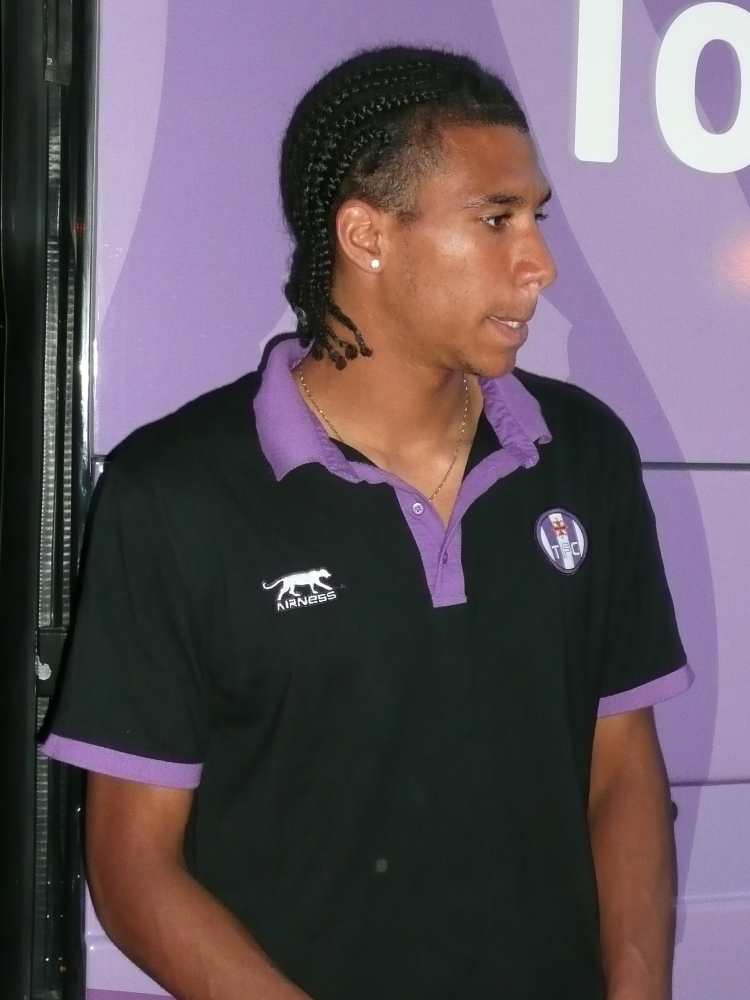
Capoue with Toulouse in 2008

Capoue began his club career with Toulouse in 2006 playing on the club's under-18 team. During the early portion of the 2007–08 season, he played on the club's Championnat de France Amateur team in the fourth division making eight appearances. Midway through the season, Capoue was called up to the senior team by manager Alain Casanova. On 8 December 2007, he made his professional debut appearing as a substitute in a 1–0 victory over Lille. The following week, Capoue made his first professional start against Paris Saint-Germain at the Parc des Princes. Toulouse won the match 2–1 with Capoue playing 71 minutes.

On 7 February 2008, Capoue, along with teammate Cheikh M'Bengue, signed his first professional contract agreeing to a three-year deal until 2011. For the 2008–09 season, Casanova paired the young defensive midfielder with former youth teammate Moussa Sissoko and new signing Étienne Didot, who arrived from Rennes. The trio performed well in the midfield with Capoue flourishing making 36 total appearances. On 18 October 2008, Capoue scored his first professional goal against Bordeaux in a 2–1 defeat. During the season, he also received 14 yellow cards in all competitions, second to only Siaka Tiéné of Valenciennes in the league. For his efforts, he was nominated for the Ligue 1 Young Player of the Year award and awarded a contract extension until 2013 by his club.

During the 2009–10 season, Capoue appeared regularly in the first team and drew interest from Italian club Lazio and Premier League clubs Liverpool and Arsenal. On 26 November 2009, Toulouse responded to the interest by reaching an agreement with Capoue on a one-year contract extension until 2014. Capoue appeared in 41 total matches for the season collecting 17 total yellow cards, 13 of which came in Ligue 1, leading all players.

=== Tottenham Hotspur ===
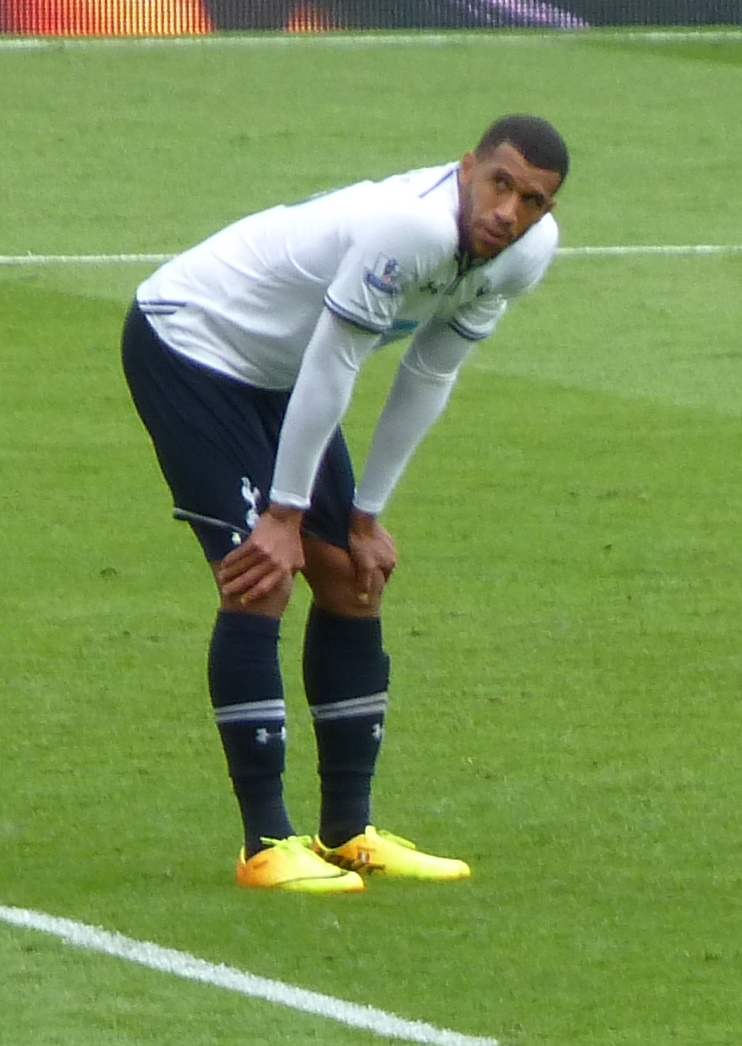
Capoue playing for Tottenham Hotspur in 2013

In July 2013, Toulouse accepted a reported £9.5 million bid from Premier League side Cardiff City. However, personal terms were not agreed and the deal was not finalised. On 15 August 2013, he completed an €11m (£9.3m) transfer to Tottenham Hotspur. The day before the announcement, Tottenham and France's first choice goalkeeper, Hugo Lloris told French newspaper L'Équipe that joining Tottenham would be a big step in Capoue's career, and stated his delight to see him join Tottenham. Capoue made his debut for Spurs on 18 August, replacing Mousa Dembélé in a 1–0 win away to Crystal Palace at Selhurst Park. He scored his first goal for the club on 29 January, in a 5–1 home loss to Manchester City, after coming on at half time for Dembélé.

Capoue began his second season partnering Nabil Bentaleb in midfield, but his performance dropped while the Algerian was injured, and Ryan Mason made a breakthrough. His only other goal for Spurs was on 14 January 2015, in an FA Cup third round replay at home to Burnley, equalising just before half time in a 4–2 win after Spurs had been trailing 2–0 with nine minutes on the clock. After that month, he took no further part in the team for the rest of the season. A loan move to Leicester City fell through, while he turned down a deal to move to West Bromwich Albion on the same basis. Capoue said in September 2015 that manager Mauricio Pochettino never spoke to him to explain why he was dropped from the team.

=== Watford ===
On 6 July 2015, Capoue joined newly promoted Watford for a club-record transfer fee, reported to be around £6.3 million, on a four-year contract.

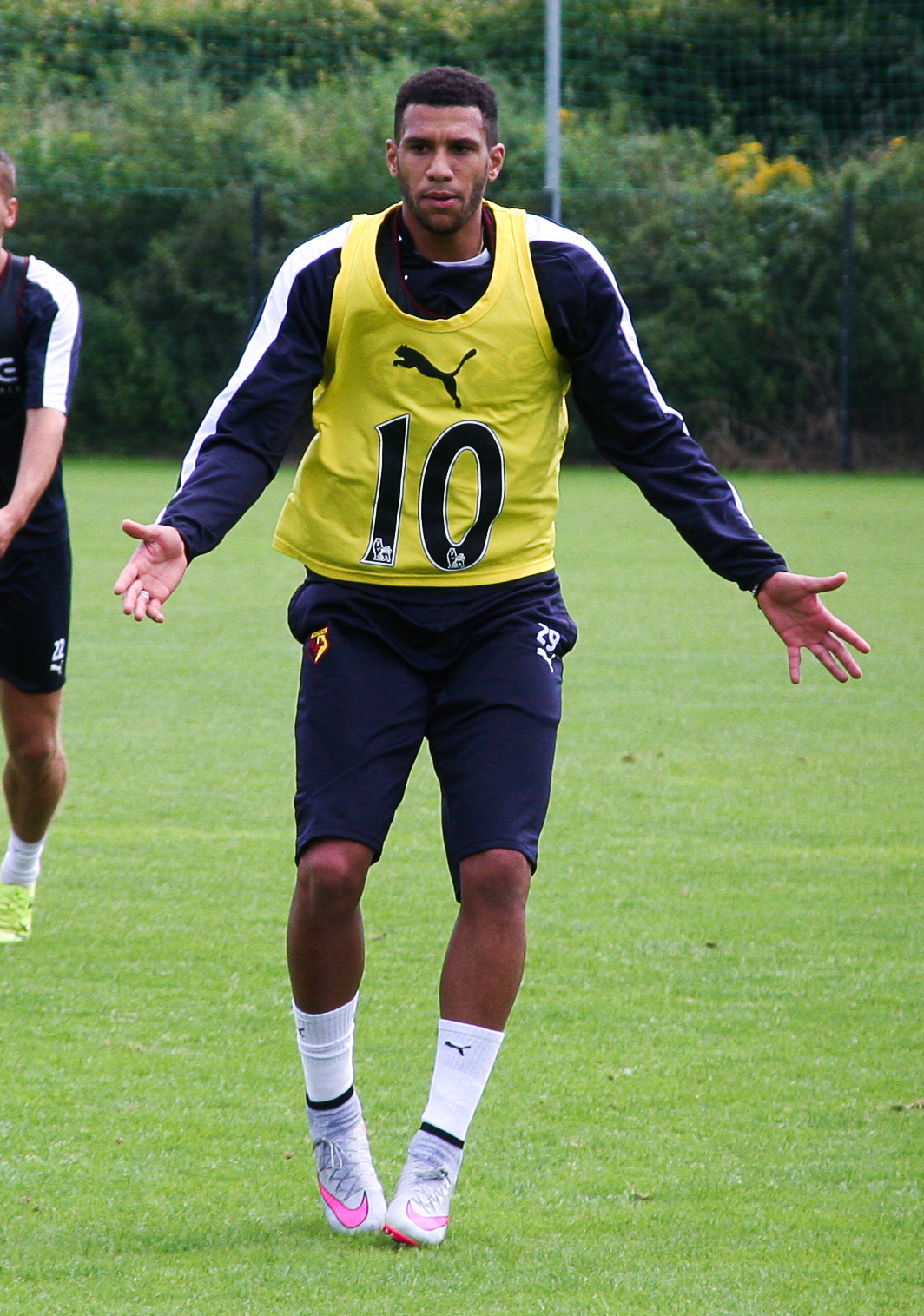
Capoue in training with Watford in 2015

He began his second season at Watford with four goals in his first six games, including the opening goal against Manchester United in a 3–1 win at Vicarage Road and another in a 4–2 comeback win against West Ham United.

In May 2019, Capoue was named as Watford's Player of the Year for the 2018–19 season.

=== Villarreal ===
On 30 December 2020, Capoue signed a two-and-a-half-year contract with Spanish club Villarreal for an undisclosed fee, starting on 4 January 2021.

Capoue was named the man of the match in Villarreal's victory over Manchester United in the 2021 UEFA Europa League Final on 26 May 2021. The win delivered Villarreal its first major trophy in club history.

On 20 July 2022, Capoue extended his contract with the Villarreal by one year, tying him to the club until June 2024. Upon the expiration of this contract, he left the club.

=== Retirement ===
Having not joined a new football club at the start of the 2024–2025 season, Capoue began physical training with the basketball club CB Jovens L'Eliana. In mid-September, still without a football club, he officially signed with the Valencian basketball team for the current season, thereby competing in the fourth tier of the Spanish basketball league system.

== International career ==
Capoue was eligible to play for Guadeloupe, due to his father being from there. Capoue has been active with France on the youth level. He has received caps with the under-18 and under-19 teams. Capoue made his youth international debut with the under-18 team on 14 March 2006 in a 2–1 victory over Germany. He finished the under-18 campaign with four appearances. He made his debut with the under-19 team at the 2006 edition of the Sendaï Cup in Japan in the opening match against the Tōhoku region national team. In the team's next group stage match against Japan, Capoue scored his first youth international goal in a 3–1 victory. On 23 January 2007, he scored his second under-17 goal in a 2–0 win against Turkey. During qualification for the 2007 UEFA European Under-19 Championship, Capoue scored his only goal in a 3–1 positive result against Poland in the Elite Round. At the UEFA European Under-19 Championship, Capoue missed the first two group stage matches, but appeared in the team final one against Russia and the team's semi-final defeat on penalties to Spain.

On 15 August 2012, Capoue made his debut for the French senior team in a friendly match against Uruguay, Didier Deschamps's first game as manager. He replaced Rio Mavuba at half time in a goalless draw. On 11 September, he scored his first goal for France in a 3–1 World Cup qualifier win over Belarus at the Stade de France.

== Personal life ==
Capoue's older brother, Aurélien, played for clubs including Nantes, and was a senior international for Guadeloupe.

== Career statistics ==
=== Club ===
As of match played 19 May 2024

Appearances and goals by club, season and competition
Club	Season	League			National cup (Note: Includes Coupe de France, FA Cup, Copa del Rey)		League cup (Note: Includes Coupe de la Ligue, Football League Cup)		Continental		Other		Total	
Club	Season	Division	Apps	Goals	Apps	Goals	Apps	Goals	Apps	Goals	Apps	Goals	Apps	Goals
Toulouse	2007–08	Ligue 1	5	0	0	0	0	0	1 (Note: Appearance in UEFA Cup)	0	—		6	0
Toulouse	2008–09	Ligue 1	32	1	3	0	1	0	—		—		36	1
Toulouse	2009–10	Ligue 1	33	0	1	0	2	0	7 (Note: Appearances in UEFA Europa League)	0	—		43	0
Toulouse	2010–11	Ligue 1	37	2	1	0	1	0	—		—		39	2
Toulouse	2011–12	Ligue 1	33	3	0	0	1	0	—		—		34	1
Toulouse	2012–13	Ligue 1	34	7	2	0	2	0	—		—		38	7
Toulouse	Total		174	13	7	0	7	0	8	0	0	0	196	13
Tottenham Hotspur	2013–14	Premier League	12	1	0	0	1	0	5	0	—		18	1
Tottenham Hotspur	2014–15	Premier League	12	0	2	1	1	0	3	0	—		18	1
Tottenham Hotspur	Total		24	1	2	1	2	0	8	0	0	0	36	2
Watford	2015–16	Premier League	33	0	3	0	0	0	—		—		36	0
Watford	2016–17	Premier League	37	7	1	0	1	0	—		—		39	7
Watford	2017–18	Premier League	23	1	2	1	1	1	—		—		26	3
Watford	2018–19	Premier League	33	1	5	2	1	1	—		—		39	4
Watford	2019–20	Premier League	30	0	0	0	0	0	—		—		30	0
Watford	2020–21	Championship	11	0	0	0	0	0	—		—		11	0
Watford	Total		167	9	11	3	3	2	0	0	0	0	181	14
Villarreal	2020–21	La Liga	16	1	3	0	—		8	0	—		27	1
Villarreal	2021–22	La Liga	30	1	1	0	—		12 (Note: Appearances in UEFA Champions League)	2	1 (Note: Appearance in UEFA Super Cup)	0	44	3
Villarreal	2022–23	La Liga	28	3	4	3	—		5 (Note: Appearances in UEFA Europa Conference League)	0	—		37	6
Villarreal	2023–24	La Liga	32	1	1	0	—		7	1	—		40	2
Villarreal	Total		106	6	9	3	0	0	32	3	1	0	148	12
Career total			471	29	29	7	12	2	48	3	1	0	561	41

=== International ===
Appearances and goals by national team and year
National team	Year	Apps	Goals
France	2012	4	1
France	2013	3	0
Total		7	1

France score listed first, score column indicates score after each Capoue goal.

List of international goals scored by Étienne Capoue
No.	Date	Venue	Opponent	Score	Result	Competition
1	11 September 2012	Stade de France, Saint-Denis, France	Belarus	1–0	3–1	2014 FIFA World Cup qualification

== Honours ==
Watford

- FA Cup runner-up: 2018–19

Villarreal

- UEFA Europa League: 2020–21

Individual

- UNFP Ligue 1 Team of the Year: 2011–12
- Watford Player of the Season: 2018–19
- UEFA Europa League Squad of the Season: 2020–21
