= 2013–14 Toulouse FC season =

Toulouse
2013–14 season
- Chairman: Olivier Sadran
- Manager: Alain Casanova
- Stadium: Stadium Municipal
- Ligue 1: 9th
- Coupe de France: Round of 32 (vs Moulins)
- Coupe de la Ligue: Round of 16 (vs Marseille)
- Top goalscorer: Wissam Ben Yedder (16)
- Average home league attendance: 14,994
Home colours	Away colours	Third colours

The 2013–14 Toulouse FC season was the club's 44th professional season since its creation in 1970. During the 2013–14 season, the club competed in the Ligue 1, Coupe de la Ligue and the Coupe de France.

== Competitions ==
=== Ligue 1 ===
==== League table ====
Pos	Team	Pld	W	D	L	GF	GA	GD	Pts
7	Bordeaux	38	13	14	11	49	43	+6	53
8	Lorient	38	13	10	15	48	53	−5	49
9	Toulouse	38	12	13	13	46	53	−7	49
10	Bastia	38	13	10	15	42	56	−14	49
11	Reims	38	12	12	14	44	52	−8	48

Source: Ligue 1
Rules for classification: 1) Points; 2) Goal difference; 3) Number of goals scored

==== Results summary ====
Overall								Home						Away					
Pld	W	D	L	GF	GA	GD	Pts	W	D	L	GF	GA	GD	W	D	L	GF	GA	GD
38	12	13	13	46	53	−7	49	5	9	5	23	26	−3	7	4	8	23	27	−4

Source: Ligue 1

==== Results by round ====
Round	1	2	3	4	5	6	7	8	9	10	11	12	13	14	15	16	17	18	19	20	21	22	23	24	25	26	27	28	29	30	31	32	33	34	35	36	37	38
Ground	A	H	A	A	H	A	H	A	H	A	H	A	H	A	H	A	H	A	H	A	H	H	A	H	A	H	A	H	A	H	A	H	A	H	A	H	A	H
Result	L	D	D	L	D	W	W	L	W	W	L	L	D	L	W	D	D	W	D	W	L	L	D	D	W	L	W	W	W	D	D	L	L	D	L	D	L	W
Position	19	19	18	20	19	15	11	14	12	8	12	15	15	14	12	14	14	11	11	10	11	12	13	12	10	10	10	9	8	8	8	8	9	9	9	10	11	9

Source: Ligue 1
A = Away; H = Home; W = Win; D = Draw; L = Loss

==== Matches ====
Win Draw Loss

10 August 2013 1	Valenciennes	3–0	Toulouse	Valenciennes
21:00	Dossevi (yellow card) 27'; Melikson 37' (pen.); Masuaku (yellow card) 49'; Saez 53'; Pujol 90+3'	Summary	Spajić (red card) 35'	Stadium: Stade du Hainaut; Attendance: 12,261; Referee: Stéphane Jochem

17 August 2013 2	Toulouse	1–1	Bordeaux	Toulouse
20:00	Ben Basat (yellow card) 8', (goal) 45'; Abdennour (yellow card) 58'; Aurier (yellow card) 86'	Summary	Poundjé (yellow card) 11'; Planus (red card) 28'; Diabaté 43'	Stadium: Stadium Municipal; Attendance: 13,111; Referee: Tony Chapron

23 August 2013 3	Monaco	0–0	Toulouse	Fontvieille, Monaco
20:30	Rivière (yellow card) 50'	Summary	Trejo (yellow card) 25'; Abdennour (yellow card) 77'; Didot (yellow card) 90+2'	Stadium: Stade Louis II; Attendance: 0 Referee: Philippe Kalt

31 August 2013 4	Bastia	2–1	Toulouse	Bastia
20:00	Khazri (yellow card) 20'; Palmieri (red card) 37'; Keserü 43'; Diakité (yellow card) 62'; Romaric 67'	Summary	Aurier (yellow card) 33'; Aguilar (yellow card) 45'; Braithwaite 57'; Spajić (yellow card) 66'; Chantôme (yellow card) 71'	Stadium: Stade Armand Cesari; Attendance: 13,669; Referee: Amaury Delerue

14 September 2013 5	Toulouse	1–1	Marseille	Toulouse
17:00	Trejo (yellow card) 36'; Ben Yedder 66'; Aurier (yellow card) 70'	Summary	Imbula (yellow card) 62'; Mendes 87'	Stadium: Stadium Municipal; Attendance: 20,111; Referee: Stéphane Lannoy

20 September 2013 6	Saint-Étienne	1–2	Toulouse	Saint-Étienne
20:30	Hamouma 18'; Erdinç (yellow card) 22'; Tabanou (yellow card) 40'	Summary	Abdennour (yellow card) 23'; Braithwaite 63'; Didot (yellow card) 70'; Sylla 75'	Stadium: Stade Geoffroy-Guichard; Attendance: 26,527; Referee: Lionel Jaffredo

25 September 2013 7	Toulouse	1–0	Lorient	Toulouse
19:00	Sylla (yellow card) 65'; Braithwaite 71'	Summary	Robert (yellow card) 62'; Coutadeur (yellow card) 76'	Stadium: Stadium Municipal; Attendance: 15,097; Referee: Wilfried Bien

28 September 2013 8	Paris Saint-Germain	2–0	Toulouse	Paris
17:00	Marquinhos; Cavani 79' (pen.)	Summary	Aurier (yellow card) 32'; Abdennour (yellow card) 63'; Aguilar (yellow card) 69'	Stadium: Parc des Princes; Attendance: 44,745; Referee: Saïd Ennjimi

5 October 2013 9	Toulouse	1–0	Nice	Toulouse
20:00	Ben Yedder 34'; Aurier (yellow card) 38'	Summary	Traoré (yellow card) 88'	Stadium: Stadium Municipal; Attendance: 10,512; Referee: Alexandre Castro

18 October 2013 10	Stade Reims	1–2	Toulouse	Reims
20:30	De Préville (yellow card) 9'; Oniangue 59'; Mandi (yellow card) 62'; Devaux (red card) 85'	Summary	Didot (yellow card) 14'; Trejo 42'; Spajić (yellow card) 65'; Braithwaite 88' (pen.)	Stadium: Stade Auguste Delaune; Attendance: 13,102; Referee: Mikael Lesage

26 October 2013 11	Toulouse	0–5	Rennes	Toulouse
20:00	Ahamada (yellow card) 43'	Summary	Alessandrini 25'; Bakayoko 34', (yellow card) 81'; Kadir 45'; Oliveira 63', 83'	Stadium: Stadium Municipal; Attendance: 11,023; Referee: Benoît Bastien

2 November 2013 12	Evian	2–1	Toulouse	Annecy
20:00	Sabaly (yellow card) 39'; Barbosa (yellow card) 41'; Wass 61'; Mongongu 90+2' (pen.)	Summary	Spajić (yellow card) 24'; Aurier 52'; Sylla (yellow card) 63'; Ninkov (yellow card) 82'	Stadium: Parc des Sports, Annecy; Attendance: 9,216; Referee: Stéphane Lannoy

9 November 2013 13	Toulouse	1–1	Ajaccio	Toulouse
20:00	Spajić (yellow card) 33'; Zebina (yellow card) 40'; Sylla 42'	Summary	Lasne 7', (yellow card) 52'; Perozo (yellow card) 43'	Stadium: Stadium Municipal; Attendance: 20,559; Referee: Laurent Duhamel

=== Coupe de la Ligue ===
29 October 2013 Round of 32	Créteil-Lusitanos	1–3	Toulouse	Créteil
20:00	Belvito 31'	Report	Aguilar 51'; Trejo 79'; Ben Yedder 90+1'	Stadium: Stade Dominique Duvauchelle; Attendance: 3,554; Referee: Jean-Charles Cailleux

18 December 2013 Round of 16	Marseille	2–1	Toulouse	Marseille
20:55	Mendy 13'; Gignac 29'	Report	Spajić 42'	Stadium: Stade Vélodrome; Attendance: 35,621; Referee: Lionel Jaffredo

=== Coupe de France ===
5 January 2014 Round of 64	Romorantin	1–2	Toulouse	Romorantin-Lanthenay
14:00	Linord 86'		Adrien Regattin 37'; Braithwaite 90+4'	Stadium: Stade Jules Ladoumègue

22 January 2014 Round of 32	Moulins	2–1	Toulouse	Moulins
19:30	Da Silva 46', 86'	Report	Eden Ben Basat 31'	Stadium: Stade Hector Rolland; Attendance: 3,500; Referee: Sébastien Desiage
