= Rafael Dias =

Rafael Dias may refer to:

- Rafaël Dias (born 1991), Portuguese footballer who plays as a midfielder
- Rafael Dias (footballer) (born 1983), Brazilian footballer who plays as a centre back

== See also ==
- Rafael Díaz (disambiguation)
