= Steeve Yago =

French-born Burkinabé footballer (born 1992)

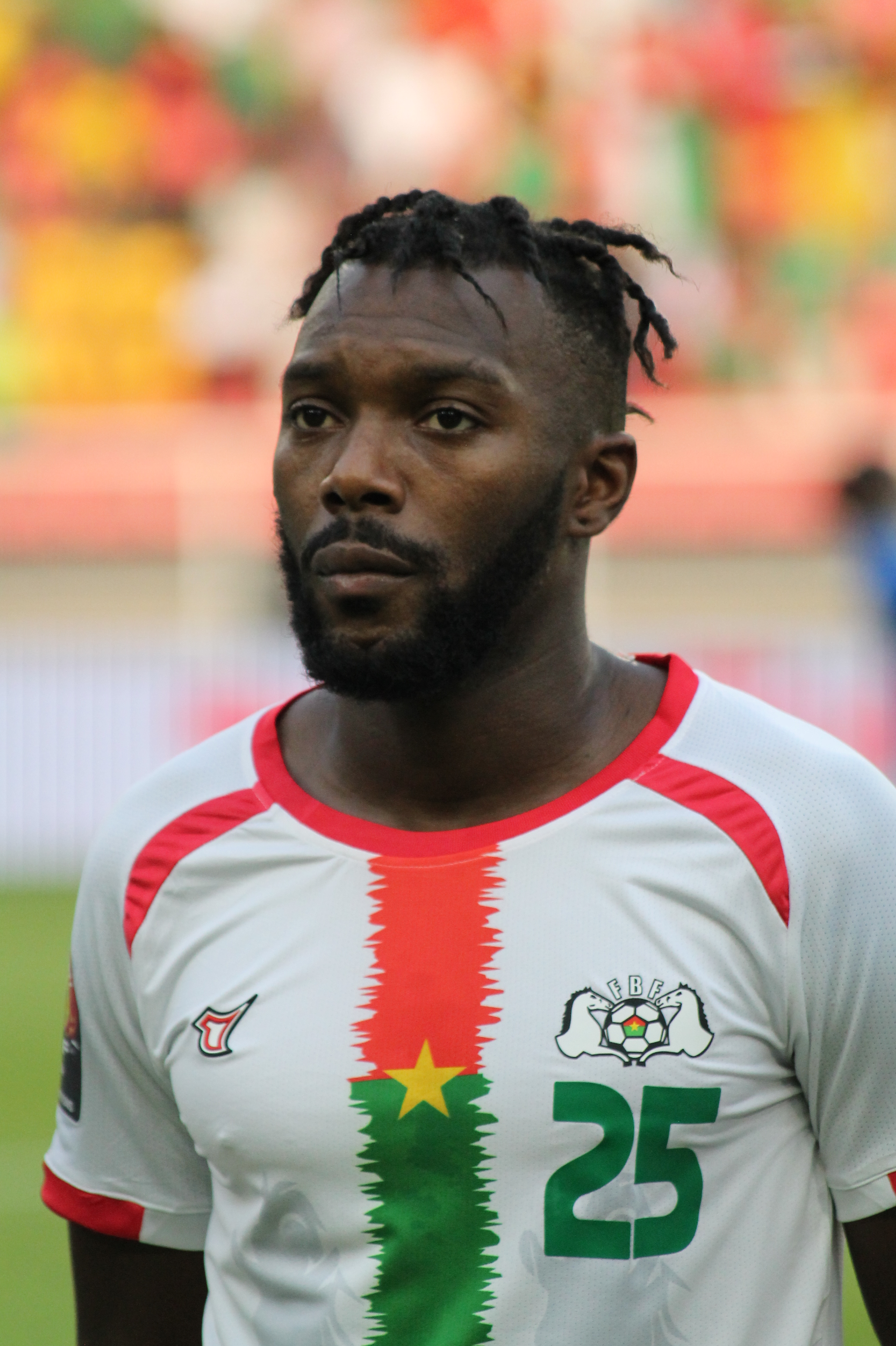
- Yago with Burkina Faso at the 2021 Africa Cup of Nations

Personal information
- Full name: Steeve Farid Yago
- Date of birth: 16 December 1992 (age 33)
- Place of birth: Sarcelles, France
- Height: 1.78 m (5 ft 10 in)
- Position: Defender

Team information
- Current team: Aris Limassol
- Number: 20

Senior career*
Years	Team	Apps	(Gls)
2012–2019	Toulouse	122	(0)
2012–2019	Toulouse B	31	(1)
2019	→ Le Havre (loan)	13	(0)
2019–2021	Caen	39	(0)
2021–	Aris Limassol	132	(1)

International career^{‡}
2013–	Burkina Faso	87	(1)
Medal record
Representing Burkina Faso
Africa Cup of Nations
Third place	2017 Gabon
- * Club domestic league appearances and goals as of 14 June 2026 ‡ National team caps and goals as of 21:34, 5 June 2024(UTC)

Steeve Farid Yago (born 16 December 1992) is a professional footballer who plays as a defender for Cypriot First Division club Aris Limassol. Born in France, he represents the Burkina Faso national team.

Yago represented Burkina Faso in the 2021 AFCON tournament in Cameroon.

== Club career ==
=== Toulouse ===
Yago developed in the youth academy of French club Toulouse. On 25 August 2012, he made his first-team debut, starting in a Ligue 1 match against AS Nancy. He was given the opportunity following an injury to Jonathan Zebina. On 19 September of the same year, he signed his first professional contract with the club.

In January 2014, Yago extended his contract with Toulouse. He signed another contract extension in July 2016, keeping him at the club until 2019. Primarily playing as a centre-back and right-back, he established himself as an important member of the first team.

On 31 January 2019, Yago joined Le Havre on loan until the end of the season.

=== Caen ===
On 2 September 2019, Yago left Toulouse and signed a two-year contract with Caen. He spent two seasons with the club, competing in Ligue 2.

=== Aris Limassol ===
In July 2021, Yago joined Cypriot club Aris Limassol. He became part of the team's defence in his first season and extended his contract with the club in July 2022. During the 2022–23 season, he helped Aris Limassol win the Cypriot First Division title for the first time in the club's history.

In July 2023, Yago extended his contract again. He signed another extension in May 2025, keeping him at the club until 2027.

== International career ==
Born in France, Yago was eligible to represent the Burkina Faso national team through his Burkinabé ancestry. He made his international debut on 10 January 2013, starting in a friendly match against Niger, which ended in a 0–0 draw.

In January 2015, Yago participated in the 2015 Africa Cup of Nations. He played in all three of Burkina Faso's group-stage matches, but the team was eliminated after recording one draw and two defeats.

In January 2017, Yago also participated in the 2017 Africa Cup of Nations. He featured in both the group stage and knockout matches, as Burkina Faso finished third after defeating the Ghana 1–0 in the third-place play-off.

In December 2021, Yago was named in the Burkina Faso squad selected by head coach Kamou Malo for the 2021 Africa Cup of Nations. He scored his first international goal in the third-place play-off against the Cameroon, which ended in a 3–3 draw. Burkina Faso subsequently lost in the penalty shoot-out and finished fourth.

On 20 December 2023, Yago was named among the 27 players selected by head coach Hubert Velud to represent Burkina Faso at the 2023 Africa Cup of Nations. He appeared in all three group-stage matches and the round of 16 match against Mali, but Burkina Faso were eliminated after losing 2–1.

On 8 December 2025, Yago was named among the 25 players selected by head coach Brama Traoré for the 2025 Africa Cup of Nations. He featured in the group-stage matches against the Equatorial Guinea and Algeria, as well as the round of 16 match against the Ivory Coast. Burkina Faso were eliminated after losing 3–0 to Ivory Coast in the round of 16.

== Career statistics ==
As of match played 4 October 2022

Club	Season	League			National Cup		League Cup		Continental		Other		Total	
Club	Season	Division	Apps	Goals	Apps	Goals	Apps	Goals	Apps	Goals	Apps	Goals	Apps	Goals
Toulouse	2012–13	Ligue 1	22	0	1	0	2	0	—		—		25	0
Toulouse	2013–14	Ligue 1	24	0	1	0	2	0	—		—		27	0
Toulouse	2014–15	Ligue 1	14	0	0	0	0	0	—		—		14	0
Toulouse	2015–16	Ligue 1	19	0	1	0	2	0	—		—		22	0
Toulouse	2016–17	Ligue 1	22	0	0	0	2	0	—		—		24	0
Toulouse	2017–18	Ligue 1	22	0	2	0	3	0	—		—		27	0
Toulouse	2018–19	Ligue 2	0	0	0	0	1	0	—		—		1	0
Toulouse	Total		123	0	5	0	12	0	—		—		140	0
Le Havre (loan)	2018–19	Ligue 2	13	0	—		—		—		—		13	0
Caen	2019–20	Ligue 2	15	0	3	0	0	0	—		—		18	0
Caen	2020–21	Ligue 2	24	0	1	0	0	0	—		—		25	0
Caen	Total		39	0	4	0	0	0	—		—		43	0
Aris Limassol	2021–22	Cypriot First Division	24	1	1	0	—		—		—		25	1
Aris Limassol	2022–23	Cypriot First Division	4	0	0	0	—		2	0	—		6	0
Aris Limassol	Total		28	1	0	0	—		2	0	0	0	31	7
Career total			203	1	10	0	12	0	2	0	0	0	227	1

== Honours ==
Burkina Faso

- Africa Cup of Nations bronze: 2017
