= Ali Ahamada =

Footballer (born 1991)

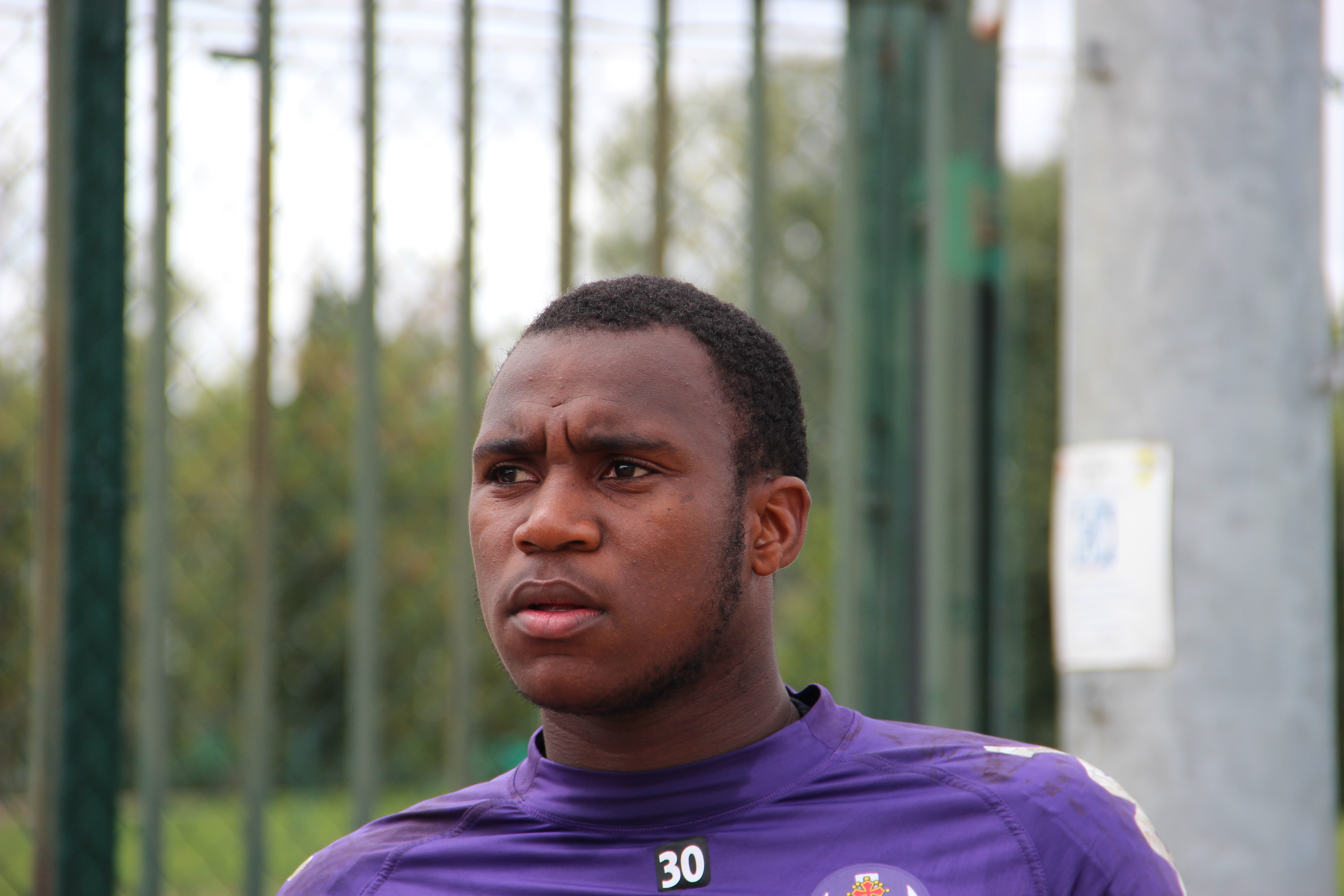
- Ahamada with Toulouse in 2012

Personal information
- Full name: Ali Ahamada
- Date of birth: 19 August 1991 (age 35)
- Place of birth: Martigues, France
- Height: 1.89 m (6 ft 2 in)
- Position: Goalkeeper

Team information
- Current team: Azam
- Number: 30

Youth career
- 2000–2009: Martigues
- 2009–2011: Toulouse

Senior career*
Years	Team	Apps	(Gls)
2011–2016	Toulouse	133	(1)
2016–2018	Kayserispor	31	(0)
2019–2020	Kongsvinger	27	(0)
2020	Brann	10	(0)
2022	Santa Coloma	7	(0)
2022–	Azam	30	(0)

International career^{‡}
2011–2012	France U21	11	(0)
2016–	Comoros	36	(0)
- * Club domestic league appearances and goals as of 22 March 2024 ‡ National team caps and goals as of 20:45, 22 December 2023 (UTC)

Ali Ahamada (born 19 August 1991) is a professional footballer who plays as a goalkeeper for Tanzanian Premier League club Azam. Born in France, he plays for the Comoros national team.

== Club career ==
=== Toulouse ===
Born in Martigues, France, Ahamada began his football career at Martigues and stayed there for nine years before joining Toulouse in 2009. Months after joining the club, he was called up to the first team following the injury of Olivier Blondel and appeared as an unused substitute against Sochaux on 10 December 2009.

Ahamada was involved in the club's first team throughout the pre–season friendlies prior to the 2010–11 season. However, he did not feature in Toulouse's first team squad until November and appeared in the substitute bench for the next two months. Ahamada made his professional debut on 20 February 2011 appearing against Rennes appearing as a substitute for the injured Marc Vidal. Four days later on 24 February 2011, he signed his first professional contract with the club, keeping him until 2014. Three weeks later on 12 March 2011, Ahamada recorded his first clean sheets when he helped Toulouse beat Lens 1–0. After sitting out on the substitute bench for the next four matches, Ahamada made his return to the starting line–up against SM Caen on 24 April 2011, as the club drew 1–1. Following this, he continued to regain his place as Toulouse's first choice goalkeeper for the rest of the season. Ahamada recorded five more clean sheets, including three consecutive clean sheets against Lyon, Lorient and Valenciennes. At the end of the 2010–11 season, he went on to make eight appearances in all competitions. Both French newspapers La Dépêche du Midi and Le Figaro praised his performance.

Ahead of the 2011–12 season, Ahamada switched number shirt from 50 to 40. However in the club's pre–season friendly tour, he suffered an abductor injury, but soon recovered. Ahamada started the season well when he kept two clean sheets in the first two league matches against Ajaccio and Dijon. Since the start of the 2011–12 season, Ahamada continued to regain his first team place as Toulouse's first choice goalkeeper. His performance was praised by fellow goalkeeper, Cédric Carrasso, saying the player has qualities and has his own technique in his ball catch. He then kept three clean sheets in three matches between 15 October 2011 and 30 October 2011 against Marseille, Lorient and Rennes. By the end of the first half of the season, Ahamada recorded ten clean sheets in the club's first nineteen matches of the season. On 15 December 2011, he signed a contract with Toulouse, keeping him until 2015. Ahamada, once again, kept three clean sheets between 18 February 2012 and 4 March 2012 against AS Nancy, Sochaux and Marseille. A week later, he kept another two clean sheets in two matches between 18 March 2012 and 25 March 2012 against Rennes and Auxerre. At the end of the 2011–12 season, Ahamada started in every league match, playing thirty–eight times, as he went on to make thirty–nine appearances in all competitions.

At the start of the 2012–13 season, Ahamada continued to establish himself as Toulouse's first choice goalkeeper. He helped the club made a good start to the season, earning nineteen points to in the first ten league matches. On 22 September 2012, Ahamada scored the 2–2 goal in a league game at home to Rennes by heading in the ball in stoppage time (in the 95th minute). In doing, he became the first goalkeeper to score since Grégory Wimbée. After the match, Le Figaro named Ahamada Team of the Week. However, his performance against Bordeaux and Ajaccio led the player to be dropped from the starting line–up against Nice on 18 November 2012. But he made his return to the starting line–up against Lyon on 25 November 2012 and kept a clean sheet, in a 3–0 win. Following this, Ahamada regained his first choice goalkeeper status role for the next four months. After making an error against Rennes on 10 February 2013, he redeemed himself by keeping four consecutive clean sheets between 23 February 2013 and 17 March 2013 against Valenciennes, Évian, Brest and Bordeaux. However in a match against Nice on 6 April 2013, Ahamada received a straight red card in the 82nd minute for handling a ball outside of the area, as Toulouse lost 4–3. After serving a one match suspension, he returned to the first team against Lorient on 21 April 2013, coming on as a 79th-minute substitute for Olivier Blondel and played for the rest of the game, as the club lost 1–0. Following this, Ahamada later started as Toulouse's first choice goalkeeper in the last remaining matches of the 2012–13 season. At the end of the 2012–13 season, he went on to make thirty–seven appearances and scoring once in all competitions. Following this, Goal.com named Ahamada as the worst player of the season, saying: "This was a rare high point for the goalkeeper, who has endured a torrid campaign. Even behind a relatively reliable defence he has been beset by problems and has made numerous gaffes."

Ahead of the 2013–14 season, Manager Alain Casanova said that he would be continuing to use Ahamada as the club's first choice goalkeeper role. Since the start of the 2013–14 season, Casanova kept his words as he continued to use the player as Toulouse's first choice goalkeeper role. However, he was at fault for conceding ten goals in five matches between 26 October 2013 and 30 November 2013. This caused Manager Casanova to defend the player. Ahamada then kept two clean sheets in two matches between 21 December 2013 and 11 January 2014 against Guingamp and Bordeaux. Following the new signing of Zacharie Boucher, he became the club's second choice goalkeeper by being demoted to the substitute bench for the rest of the 2013–14 season and never played again. At the end of the 2013–14 season, Ahamada went on to make twenty–three appearances in all competitions.

At the start of the 2014–15 season, Ahamada continued to compete with Boucher over Toulouse's first goalkeeper role. He made his first appearance of the season, starting the whole game, in a 1–0 loss against Bastia on 23 August 2014. Following this, he returned to the substitute bench for the next three months. Following Boucher's demotion to the substitution bench, Ahamada returned to the starting line–up against Metz on 8 November 2014 and kept a clean sheet, as the club won 3–0. Afterwards, he regained his place as Toulouse's first choice goalkeeper for the next three months. On 31 December 2014, Ahamada signed a contract with the club, keeping him until 2018. However, he suffered a shoulder injury that saw him miss three matches. Ahamada later returned to the starting line–up against Bordeaux on 21 March 2015 and helped Toulouse win 2–1. He then kept two clean sheets in two matches between 12 April 2015 and 18 April 2015 against Montpellier and Lorient. Ahamada remained as the club's first choice goalkeeper for the remaining matches of the 2014–15 season, as he helped Toulouse narrowly avoided relegation as they finished in 17th place. At the end of the 2014–15 season, Ahamada went on to make twenty–five appearances in all competitions. However, newspaper Le Figaro was critical of his performance, calling a flop.

After the departure of Boucher, Ahamada continued to remain as the club's second choice goalkeeper behind new signing Alban Lafont and Mauro Goicoechea. After the injury of Goicoechea, he made his first appearance of the season, starting the whole game, in a 2–2 draw against Gazélec Ajaccio on 3 October 2015. Following this, Ahamada started as Toulouse's first choice goalkeeper for the next five matches. He also played a role in the club's match against Auxerre in the third round of the Coupe De La Ligue by saving four penalties in the shootout following a 3–3 draw throughout 120 minutes. After Lafont become Toulouse's first choice goalkeeper, Ahamada returned back to the substitute bench. Despite this, he captained two matches in Toulouse's Coupe De La Ligue matches against Rennes and Marseille. L’Equipe reported that Ahamada will leave the club in the January transfer window. By the time Ahamada left the club, he made nine appearances in all competitions.

=== Kayserispor ===
On 26 January 2016, Ahamada moved to Turkey when he signed for Süper Lig side Kayserispor on a two-and-a-half-year contract.

Ahamada made his debut for the club, starting the whole game, as Kayserispor lost 2–1 against Trabzonspor on 15 February 2016. In a match against Fenerbahçe on 13 March 2016, he saved a penalty from Fernandão, as the club lost 1–0. In a follow–up, Ahamada helped Kayserispor keep three clean sheets in the next three matches against Eskişehirspor, Çaykur Rizespor and Antalyaspor. Since joining the club, he became a first choice goalkeeper for the rest of the 2015–16 season. At the end of the 2015–16 season, Ahamada went on to make thirteen appearances in all competitions.

At the start of the 2016–17 season, Ahamada started as Kayserispor's first choice goalkeeper in the club's first two league matches of the season. In a match against Galatasaray on 12 September 2016, he fractured his arm and was substituted in the 28th minute, as Kayserispor drew 1–1. After the match, it was announced that Ahamada would be out for six weeks. He then made his return to the starting line–up against Bucaspor in the third round of the Turkish Cup and kept a clean sheet, in a 3–0 to help the club advance to the next round. Although Ahamada returned from injury, he was Kayserispor's second choice goalkeeper role behind Muammer Yıldırım for the next four matches. But Ahamada regained his first team place as the club's first choice goalkeeper role once again. At times, he and Yıldırım continued to fight over the first choice goalkeeper role for the rest of the 2016–17 season. Despite this, Ahamada went on to make twenty–three appearances in all competitions.

Ahead of the 2017–18 season, Ahamada was told by Kayserispor's management that he can leave the club. But Ahamada never left Kayserispor and was sidelined from the first team for the rest of the 2017–18 season. In January 2018, he eventually left the club by mutual consent and spent the whole year training in his hometown to maintain his fitness.

=== Kongsvinger ===
It was announced on 10 March 2019 that Ahamada moved to Norway to sign for OBOS-ligaen side Kongsvinger. Upon joining the club, he said: "It is a good opportunity for me to come to Kongsvinger. I have not played football for a long time and I am happy to give myself the opportunity to restart my career."

Ahamada made his debut for Kongsvinger in the opening game of the season against Notodden FK and kept a clean sheet, in a 1–0 win. He followed up by starting in the next three matches and kept two clean sheets along the way. However, Ahamada suffered a shoulder injury during a match against Ull/Kisa on 28 April 2019 and was sidelined for two weeks. He made his return to the starting line–up against Hamarkameratene on 16 May 2019, as the club lost 2–0. Following this, Ahamada regained his first choice goalkeeper role at Kongsvinger. The next two months saw the player kept three more clean sheets for the club. For the rest of the 2019 season, he later helped Kongsvinger keep four more clean sheets and helped the club qualify for the promotion play–offs. However, Kongsvinger failed to reach the promotion play–offs after losing 2–0 against KFUM Oslo on 27 November 2019. At the end of the 2019 season, Ahamada went on to make thirty–one appearances in all competitions.

Following this, his future at the club became uncertain due to a contract situation ahead of the 2020 season. However, due to the pandemic, the season was pushed back to June.

=== SK Brann ===
On 9 June 2020, Ahamada moved to Brann for the rest of the 2020 season.

He made his debut for the club, starting the whole game, in a 2–1 win against Haugesund in the opening game of the season. Since joining Brann, Ahamada quickly established as the club's first choice goalkeeper in the first nine league matches. During a 3–1 win against Sandefjord on 12 July 2020, he was booked in the 22nd minute after giving away a penalty and successfully saved it from Rufo. After the match, Brann appealed his booking and it was later rescinded. However, Ahamada suffered ankle injury that saw him out for a month. On 29 August 2020, he returned from injury, appearing as an unused substitute for a match against Strømsgodset. Following this, Ahamada continued to remain on the substitute bench for the next two months. He returned to the first team against Haugesund on 7 November 2020 and started the whole game, as SK Brann lost 2–1. Following this, Ahamada never played for the club again after missing two matches due to a quarantine. At the end of the 2020 season, he went on to make ten appearances in all competitions. Following this, it was announced on 22 December 2020 that Ahamada left the club by mutual consent.

=== Later career ===
Free of any contract since January 2021, Ahamada finally found a club for the rest of the season, signing with Andorran side UE Santa Coloma. In July 2022, Ahamada joined Tanzanian club Azam FC.

== International career ==
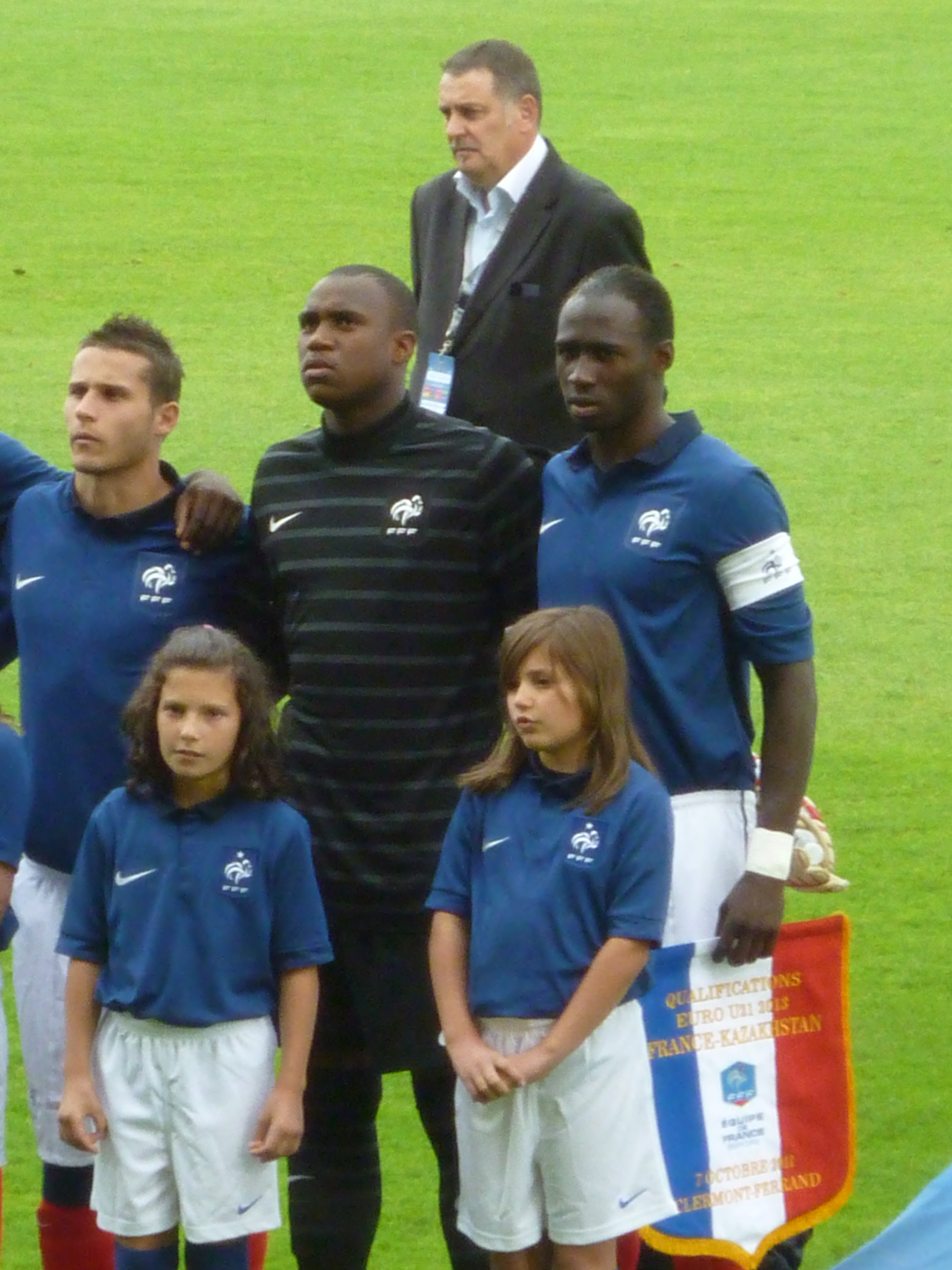
Ahamada lining up for France U21 in 2011.

Ahamada was born in France to parents of Comorian descent, making eligible to play for either France or Comoros.

=== France ===
In May 2011, Ahamada and teammate Yannis Tafer were called up to the France U20 squad, but Toulouse refused to let the pair go, citing commitment with the club. Three months later, he was called up to the France U21 squad for the first time. Ahamada made his debut for the national U21 team, starting the whole game and kept a clean sheet, in a 3–0 win against Latvia U21 on 2 September 2011. He later helped France U21 keep four more clean sheets by the end of the year.

For the rest of the 2012, Ahamada continued to remain the first choice goalkeeper for the national U21 team. He later earn himself three clean sheets, coming against Latvia U21, Kazakhstan U21 and Norway U21. Ahamada went on to make twelve appearances in all competitions for France U21.

=== Comoros ===
In March 2016, Ahamada was called up to the Comoros for the first time. He made his debut for the national team, starting the whole game, in a historic 1–0 win over Botswana for 2017 Africa Cup of Nations qualification. However, Ahamada played four more matches for Comoros, as the national team were eventually eliminated from the Group Stage.

He continued to be the Comoros’ first choice goalkeeper throughout 2017, making five appearances. He then featured four times in the 2019 Africa Cup of Nations qualification, as Comoros were eventually eliminated from the Group Stage. During which, Ahamada set up the national team's second goal of the game, in a 2–2 draw against Morocco on 17 October 2018. Following this, Ahamada helped Comoros keep three consecutive clean sheets between 12 October 2019 and 18 November 2019.

The following year, he was called up to the Comoros squad for the first time in almost a year. Ahamada started in goal when he helped the national team beat Libya 2–1 in a friendly match on 11 October 2020. Ahamada played in the first leg of the Africa Cup of Nations qualification against Kenya, as Comoros won 3–1 on aggregate.

== Personal life ==
Ahamada is a Muslim, saying: "he prays before, during and after the match, but doesn't do Ramadan, saying it's incompatible and prays five times a day."

Three months after moving Turkey, Ahamada spoke about his time in the country, saying: "I have no information about Turkey before coming to Kayserispor and I had no idea. However, with arriving and Turkey after the Turkish people know well that I arrived. I said: ‘’"currently Turkey and Kayserispor"’’. I am very happy to come to the fans and I love them. Kayserispor has very good facilities, with very good staff. I feel very good here and work very comfortably. I want to learn Turkish football and Turkish." In addition to speaking French, he also speaks English, having the language at a young age.

Prior to the match against Lyon on 11 January 2015, newspaper L'Équipe reported that Ahamada will not wear the 'Je suis Charlie' t-shirt during the warm-up for the match. Responding to the report, Toulouse's president, Olivier Sadran said the report was false.

== Career statistics ==
=== Club ===
As of match played 16 October 2022

Appearances and goals by club, season and competition
Club	Season	League			Cup		League Cup		Continental		Other		Total	
Club	Season	Division	Apps	Goals	Apps	Goals	Apps	Goals	Apps	Goals	Apps	Goals	Apps	Goals
Toulouse	2009–10	Ligue 1	0	0	0	0	0	0	0	0	—		0	0
Toulouse	2010–11	Ligue 1	9	0	0	0	0	0	—		—		9	0
Toulouse	2011–12	Ligue 1	38	0	1	0	0	0	—		—		39	0
Toulouse	2012–13	Ligue 1	36	1	1	0	0	0	—		—		37	1
Toulouse	2013–14	Ligue 1	21	0	2	0	0	0	—		—		23	0
Toulouse	2014–15	Ligue 1	23	0	1	0	0	0	—		—		24	0
Toulouse	2015–16	Ligue 1	6	0	0	0	3	0	—		—		9	0
Toulouse	Total		133	1	5	0	3	0	—		—		141	1
Kayserispor	2015–16	Süper Lig	13	0	0	0	—		—		—		13	0
Kayserispor	2016–17	Süper Lig	18	0	5	0	—		—		—		23	0
Kayserispor	Total		31	0	5	0	—		—		—		36	0
Kongsvinger	2019	OBOS-ligaen	27	0	2	0	—		—		—		29	0
Brann	2020	Eliteserien	10	0	0	0	—		—		—		10	0
UE Santa Coloma	2021–22	Primera Divisió	7	0	0	0	—		—		—		7	0
Azam	2022–23	Tanzanian Premier League					—		2	0	—		2	0
Azam	2023–24	Tanzanian Premier League					—		—		—		0	0
Azam	2024–25	Tanzanian Premier League					—		—		—		0	0
Azam	Total						—		2	0	—		2	0
Career total			208	1	14	0	0	0	2	0	0	0	224	1
