= Sirieix =

Sirieix is a surname. Notable people with the surname include:

- Andrea Spendolini-Sirieix (born 2004), British diver
- Fred Sirieix (born 1972), French maître d'hôtel
- Pantxi Sirieix (born 1980), French football player
