= Rafael Díaz =

Rafael Díaz or Diaz may refer to

- Rafael Díaz (baseball)
- Rafael Díaz (footballer)
- Rafael Diaz (character), a character from Star vs. the Forces of Evil

== See also ==
- Raphael Diaz, Swiss ice hockey defenseman
- Rafael Dias (disambiguation)
