= Issiaga Sylla =

Guinean footballer (born 1994)

- Sylla with Guinea 2024

Personal information
- Date of birth: 1 January 1994 (age 32)
- Place of birth: Conakry, Guinea
- Height: 1.80 m (5 ft 11 in)
- Position: Left-back

Youth career
- –2011: Horoya AC

Senior career*
Years	Team	Apps	(Gls)
2011–2012	Horoya AC	1	(0)
2012–2015	Toulouse B	18	(1)
2013–2023	Toulouse	194	(9)
2015–2016	→ Gazélec Ajaccio (loan)	34	(0)
2020–2021	→ Lens (loan)	20	(1)
2020	→ Lens B (loan)	1	(0)
2023–2025	Montpellier	53	(3)
2025–2026	Asteras Tripolis	22	(0)

International career^{‡}
2011–	Guinea	90	(3)
- * Club domestic league appearances and goals as of 5 May 2026 ‡ National team caps and goals as of 31 March 2026

Issiaga Sylla (born 1 January 1994) is a Guinean professional footballer who plays as a left-back for the Guinea national team.

He is Guinea national team most capped player.

== Club career ==
Sylla was born in Conakry, Guinea. He made his debut for Toulouse on 4 May 2013, starting as a left midfielder in a 4–2 win over Lille.

Sylla was loaned out to promoted side Gazélec Ajaccio for the 2015–16 Ligue 1 season.

On 31 January 2023, Sylla signed for Ligue 1 club Montpellier.

On 15 July 2025, he signed for Greek side Asteras Tripolis.

In October 2026, he ended his contract with Asteras Tripolis and is since then a free agent.

== International career ==
Sylla made his international debut for the Guinea national team at 7 September 2011 against Venezuela. He played with the national team in 2015 Africa Cup of Nations, where the team reached the quarter-finals.

== Career statistics ==
=== Club ===
As of match played 2 May 2026

Appearances and goals by club, season and competition
Club	Season	League			National cup		League cup		Continental		Other		Total	
Club	Season	Division	Apps	Goals	Apps	Goals	Apps	Goals	Apps	Goals	Apps	Goals	Apps	Goals
Horoya	2012	CAF Champions League	—		—		—		1 (Note: Appearance in CAF Champions League)	0	—		1	0
Toulouse II	2012–13	Championnat National 3	12	1	—		—		—		—		12	1
Toulouse II	2013–14	Championnat National 3	1	0	—		—		—		—		1	0
Toulouse II	2014–15	Championnat National 3	5	0	—		—		—		—		5	0
Toulouse II	Total		18	1	—		—		—		—		18	1
Toulouse	2012–13	Ligue 1	4	1	0	0	—		—		—		4	1
Toulouse	2013–14	Ligue 1	32	3	2	0	2	1	—		—		36	4
Toulouse	2014–15	Ligue 1	12	1	0	0	0	0	—		—		12	1
Toulouse	2016–17	Ligue 1	27	1	1	0	2	0	—		—		30	1
Toulouse	2017–18	Ligue 1	25	1	1	0	2	1	—		—		28	2
Toulouse	2018–19	Ligue 1	24	2	3	0	1	0	—		—		28	2
Toulouse	2019–20	Ligue 1	28	0	0	0	1	0	—		—		29	0
Toulouse	2021–22	Ligue 2	25	0	1	0	—		—		—		26	0
Toulouse	2022–23	Ligue 1	17	0	1	0	—		—		—		18	0
Toulouse	Total		194	9	9	0	8	2	—		—		211	11
Ajaccio (loan)	2015–16	Ligue 1	34	0	3	0	1	0	—		—		38	0
Lens (loan)	2020–21	Ligue 1	20	1	1	0	—		—		—		21	1
Lens II (loan)	2020–21	Championnat National 2	1	0	—		—		—		—		1	0
Montpellier	2022–23	Ligue 1	15	1	—		—		—		—		15	1
Montpellier	2023–24	Ligue 1	19	1	0	0	—		—		—		19	1
Montpellier	2024–25	Ligue 1	19	1	1	0	—		—		—		20	1
Montpellier	Total		108	4	5	0	—		—		—		114	4
Asteras Tripolis	2025–26	Super League Greece	22	0	1	0	—		—		—		23	0
Career total			343	14	15	0	9	2	1	0	0	0	366	16

=== International ===
As of match played 31 March 2026

Appearances and goals by national team and year
National team	Year	Apps	Goals
Guinea	2011	1	0
Guinea	2012	0	0
Guinea	2013	5	0
Guinea	2014	7	0
Guinea	2015	11	0
Guinea	2016	5	0
Guinea	2017	8	1
Guinea	2018	5	0
Guinea	2019	12	1
Guinea	2020	1	0
Guinea	2021	6	0
Guinea	2022	9	1
Guinea	2023	5	0
Guinea	2024	11	0
Guinea	2025	4	0
Guinea	2026	2	0
Total		92	3

Scores and results list Guinea's goal tally first, score column indicates score after each Sylla goal.

List of international goals scored by Issiaga Sylla
No.	Date	Venue	Opponent	Score	Result	Competition
1	24 March 2017	Stade Océane, Le Havre, France	Gabon	2–1	2–2	Friendly
2	17 November 2019	Stade du 28 Septembre, Conakry, Guinea	Namibia	1–0	2–0	2021 Africa Cup of Nations qualification
3	10 January 2022	Kouekong Stadium, Bafoussam, Cameroon	Malawi	1–0	1–0	2021 Africa Cup of Nations

== Honours ==
Horoya AC

- Guinée Championnat National: 2011–12

Toulouse

- Ligue 2: 2021–22
