= Franck Tabanou =

French footballer (born 1989)

Personal information
- Full name: Franck Pascal Paul Tabanou
- Date of birth: 30 January 1989 (age 37)
- Place of birth: Thiais, Val-de-Marne, France
- Height: 1.78 m (5 ft 10 in)
- Positions: Left-back; left midfielder

Youth career
- 1998–2002: Choisy-le-Roi
- 2002–2005: Le Havre
- 2005–2006: CFF Paris
- 2006–2008: Toulouse

Senior career*
Years	Team	Apps	(Gls)
2008–2013	Toulouse	138	(15)
2013–2015	Saint-Étienne	82	(6)
2015–2017	Swansea City	0	(0)
2016	→ Saint-Étienne (loan)	11	(0)
2016–2017	→ Granada (loan)	6	(0)
2017–2019	Guingamp	17	(0)
Total		254	(21)

International career
2009	France U20	3	(1)
2009–2010	France U21	12	(0)
- * Club domestic league appearances and goals

Franck Pascal Paul Tabanou (born 30 January 1989) is a French professional footballer who last played for Guingamp as a left-back. Tabanou is a French youth international having starred at under-20 and under-21 level. He played with the under-20 team at the 2009 Mediterranean Games.

== Club career ==
=== Early career ===
Tabanou began his football career at AS Choisy-le-Roi, a club located in the southeastern suburbs of Paris. Growing up in the greater Paris area, he supported Paris Saint-Germain during his childhood. After four years at the club, in June 2002, he signed with professional club Le Havre. While in the club's youth academy, Tabanou was supervised by club coaches Thierry Uvenard and Luc Bruder. After three years at the club, he departed and returned to Paris joining the Centre de Formation de Paris, a youth sporting club designed to cater only to football players under the age of 19.

=== Toulouse ===
Upon his arrival to the club, Tabanou was inserted onto the club's under-18 team for the 2006–07 season and had a successful campaign. Midway through the season, he was called up to the club's Championnat de France amateur team in the fourth division. Tabanou appeared in five matches with the team. Ahead of the 2007–08 season, he was promoted to the reserve team on a permanent basis and featured in 20 matches.

In the ensuing season, Tabanou began training with the senior team under manager Alain Casanova. He appeared in several pre-season matches, but endured criticism for some of his performances as the pre-season wore on. Tabanou, himself, admitted that the criticism was justified stating that he relied too much on his technical skills. As a result, prior to the start of the season, he was demoted back to the reserve team. In January 2009, Tabanou was called back into the senior team by Casanova who was impressed by the player's performance with the reserve team. After appearing on the bench in several matches, he made his professional debut on 2 May 2009 in a league match against Marseille. Tabanou appeared as a substitute in the match, which ended 2–2. Two days later, he signed his first professional contract after agreeing to a one-year deal with the club. Tabanou, subsequently, appeared in the final four matches of the season. One of those matches including his first professional start against Saint-Étienne.

Tabanou was officially promoted to the senior team for the 2009–10 season and assigned the number 27 shirt. He featured as a substitute in the first two matches of the season and, by mid-September, had permanently taken over as starter on the left side of midfield. In January 2010, with the player's contract due to expire in June, Toulouse signed Tabanou to a three-year contract extension. On 16 January, Tabanou rewarded the club's decision to extend him by scoring a double in a 3–1 victory over Valenciennes. On 10 April, he repeated this feat by netting another two goals in a 4–0 home win over Grenoble.

Due to injuries to incumbent left back Cheikh M'Bengue, Casanova tasked Tabanou with the job of deputizing for him for the 2010–11 season. Tabanou started in the position for the majority of the fall campaign and assisted on his first two goals of his career in a 2–0 win over Nancy and a 3–1 loss to Rennes.

=== Saint-Étienne ===
On 28 July 2013, Tabanou trains with Ligue 1 club Saint-Étienne, on the verge of signing a new contract with them following a transfer from Toulouse. He scored his first goal against Esbjerg in the Europa League.

=== Swansea City ===
On 19 June 2015, Tabanou joined Swansea City for a reported £3.5 million. Tabanou then went on to make his debut in English football in the EFL Cup vs York City where he played his first full 90 minutes for the club.

==== Saint-Étienne (loan) ====
On 15 January 2016, Tabanou returned to Saint-Étienne on loan from Swansea for the rest of the season.

==== Granada (loan) ====
On 31 August 2016, Tabanou joined Spanish club Granada on a season-long loan deal where he only made 7 appearances in total.

=== Guingamp ===
On 1 August 2017, it was announced that Tabanou was released by Swansea City at the end of the 2016–17 season and joined French club Guingamp.

He retired at Guingamp in June 2019 after he was only able to make fifteen appearances in 2017–18 and a further four appearances in 2018–19.

== Career statistics ==
As of 5 September 2019

Club	Season	League			Cup		League Cup		Other		Total	
Club	Season	Division	Apps	Goals	Apps	Goals	Apps	Goals	Apps	Goals	Apps	Goals
Toulouse	2008–09	Ligue 1	5	0	0	0	0	0	0	0	5	0
Toulouse	2009–10	Ligue 1	33	4	1	0	2	0	5	0	41	4
Toulouse	2010–11	Ligue 1	34	4	1	0	0	0	0	0	35	4
Toulouse	2011–12	Ligue 1	32	3	1	0	1	0	0	0	34	3
Toulouse	2012–13	Ligue 1	34	4	1	1	2	0	0	0	37	5
Toulouse	Total		138	15	4	1	5	0	5	0	163	16
Saint-Étienne	2013–14	Ligue 1	34	3	0	0	1	0	4	1	39	4
Saint-Étienne	2014–15	Ligue 1	31	1	4	1	2	0	6	0	43	2
Saint-Étienne	Total		65	4	4	1	3	0	10	1	82	6
Swansea City	2015–16	Premier League	0	0	1	0	2	0	0	0	3	0
Saint-Étienne (on loan)	2015–16	Ligue 1	11	0	1	0	0	0	2	0	14	0
Granada (on loan)	2016–17	La Liga	6	0	1	0	0	0	0	0	7	0
Guingamp	2017–18	Ligue 1	15	0	0	0	0	0	0	0	15	0
Guingamp	2018–19	Ligue 1	2	0	0	0	2	0	0	0	4	0
Guingamp	Total		17	0	0	0	2	0	0	0	19	0
Career total			247	19	11	2	12	0	17	1	287	22

== Honours ==
Guingamp

- Coupe de la Ligue runner-up: 2018–19
