= Marc Vidal (footballer, born 1991) =

French footballer

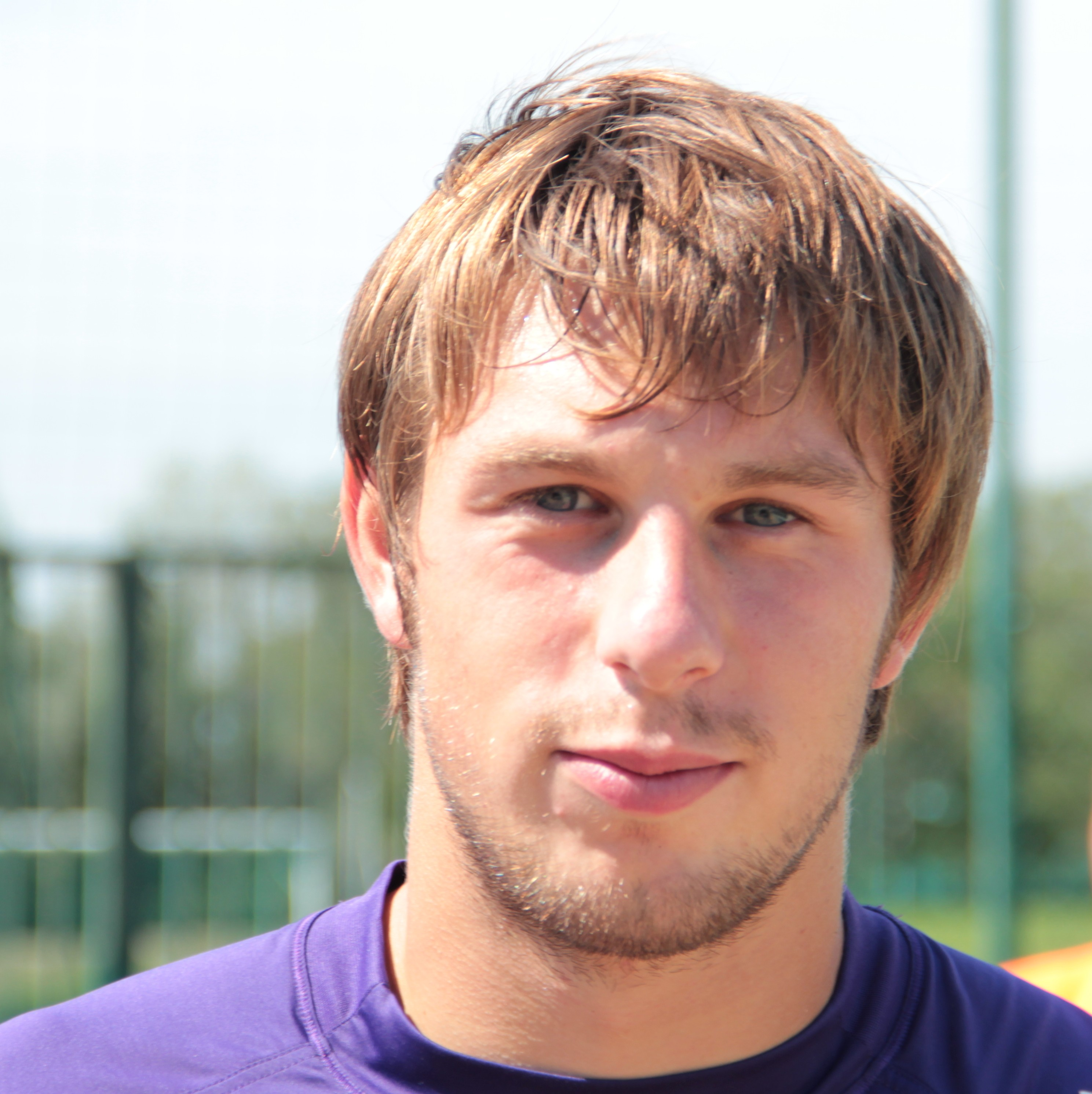

Personal information
- Date of birth: 3 June 1991 (age 35)
- Place of birth: Saint-Affrique, France
- Height: 1.87 m (6 ft 2 in)
- Position: Goalkeeper

Youth career
- 1997–2005: SS Saint-Affrique
- 2003–2005: INF Castelmaurou
- 2005–2010: Toulouse

Senior career*
Years	Team	Apps	(Gls)
2010–2019	Toulouse	3	(0)
2012–2019	Toulouse B	77	(0)
2020–2021	Blagnac	10	(0)
2021–2022	Rodez	1	(0)
2022–2023	Béziers	26	(0)

International career
2008–2009	France U18	2	(0)
2010	France U19	2	(0)
2010–2011	France U20	1	(0)
- * Club domestic league appearances and goals as of 8 October 2025

Marc Vidal (born 3 June 1991) is a French professional footballer who plays as a goalkeeper.

He is a former French youth international having represented the under-18, under-19 and under-20 team. He made his professional debut on 13 February 2010 in a league match against Lorient.

== Club career ==
=== Early career ===
Vidal was born in Saint-Affrique, a small commune in the Aveyron department. He began his football career playing for his hometown club Stade Saint-Affrique Sportive. Vidal's ability at Saint-Affrique saw him achieved selection to the Castelmaurou academy, which serves as the Clairefontaine of the Midi-Pyrénées region. While at the academy, Vidal crafted his goalkeeping skills under the tutelage of former French international Fabien Barthez, who grew up in the area and served as an occasional coach. Vidal stated he models his game after the former Manchester United netminder. After a two-year stint at the academy, Vidal signed with the biggest club in the region, Toulouse.

=== Toulouse ===
Vidal established himself at the club's training center becoming a youth international. For the 2009–10 season, Vidal was installed as the head goalkeeper of the club's amateur team playing in CFA 2, the fifth division of French football, and the third goalkeeper on the club's senior team. In late September 2009, Vidal suffered an extensive injury to his shoulder and also fractured his fifth metatarsal bone during a training session and missed several months. During his recovery phase, the senior team endured a disastrous injury crisis losing both Yohann Pelé (starting goalkeeper) and Olivier Blondel (backup goalkeeper) to injuries. The resulting injuries led Toulouse to start 17-year-old Anthony Loustallot in goal against Sochaux. Toulouse won the match 2–0. For the early part of 2010, Vidal was relegated to the club's 5th goalkeeper following the acquisition of Mathieu Valverde and the emergence of Loustallot. However, following a severe groin injury to Valverde against Brest mid-week in the Coupe de France, Vidal was inserted into the starting role for the club's league match against Lorient on 13 February. Vidal made his professional debut in that match, which ended 1–1. Vidal performed well and preserved the draw following a tremendous save in injury time.

=== Blagnac ===
Since the end of his contract with the Toulouse in June 2019, Marc Vidal was unemployed until he joined Championnat National 3 club Blagnac FC in February 2020.

=== Rodez ===
On 3 August 2021, he signed a one-year contract with Rodez in Ligue 2.

=== Béziers ===
For the 2022–23 season, Vidal joined fifth-tier Championnat National 3 club Béziers.

== Honours ==
=== International ===
France under-19

- UEFA European Under-19 Football Championship: 2010
