= Adil Hermach =

Moroccan footballer (born 1986)

Personal information
- Date of birth: 27 June 1986 (age 40)
- Place of birth: Nîmes, France
- Height: 1.77 m (5 ft 10 in)
- Positions: Defensive midfielder; centre-back

Team information
- Current team: Wydad AC (advisor)

Senior career*
Years	Team	Apps	(Gls)
2003–2004	Nîmes	3	(0)
2004–2006	Lens B	42	(4)
2006–2011	Lens	100	(5)
2008	→ Roeselare (loan)	12	(0)
2011–2014	Al-Hilal	59	(9)
2013	→ Toulouse (loan)	10	(0)
2014–2015	Al-Wahda	33	(3)
2015	Nîmes	10	(0)
2016–2018	Al Dhafra	47	(5)
2018–2019	Ajman	24	(5)
2019–2020	Stade Beaucairois	5	(0)
Total		345	(31)

International career
2008–2014	Morocco	20	(0)

Managerial career
- 2023–2024: Nîmes Olympique B
- 2024–2025: Nîmes Olympique
- 2025–: Wydad AC (advisor)
- * Club domestic league appearances and goals

Adil Hermach (Arabic: عادل هرماش; born 27 June 1986) is a French-Moroccan professional football manager and former player who is the advisor for Moroccan Botola Pro club Wydad AC.

== Career ==
Born in Nîmes, France, Hermach represented the Morocco national team in the Olympics. he made his first cap for Morocco in a friendly match against Belgium on 26 March 2008.

After signing for Lens from Nîmes, Hermach played in RC Lens reserve team but for the 2007–08 season he was given a squad number for the first team. After the 2008–09 campaign, in which Lens relegated down to Ligue 2, he was a regular starting, making 22 appearances.

On 22 June 2011, he ended a six-year spell at Lens to join Saudi Premier League club Al-Hilal. He left the club on 27 December 2013.
