= Olivier Blondel =

French footballer (born 1979)

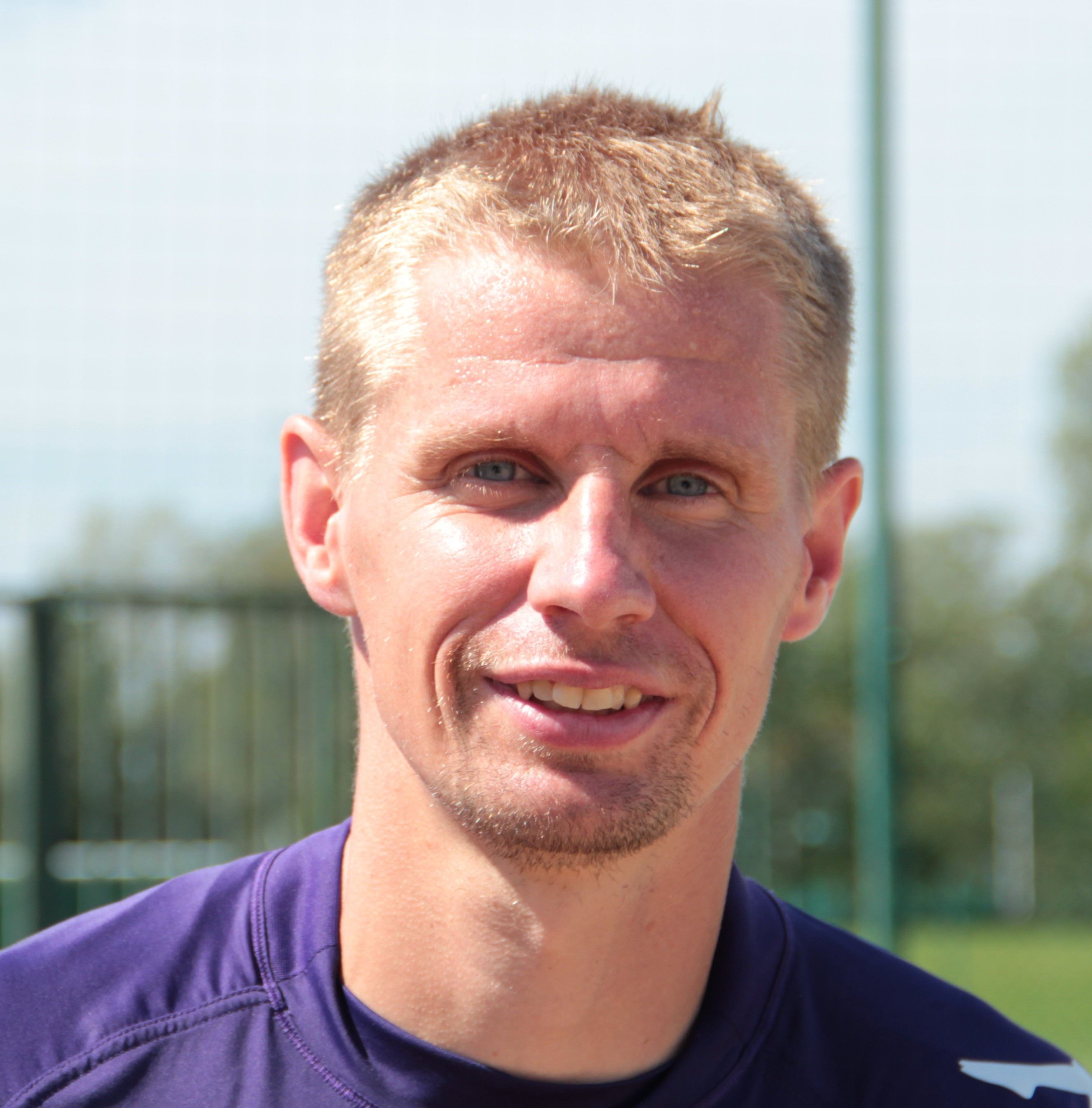

Personal information
- Date of birth: 9 July 1979 (age 47)
- Place of birth: Mont-Saint-Aignan, France
- Height: 1.87 m (6 ft 2 in)
- Position: Goalkeeper

Senior career*
Years	Team	Apps	(Gls)
1998–2008	Le Havre	13	(0)
2008–2010	Toulouse	14	(0)
2010–2012	Troyes	54	(0)
2012–2014	Toulouse	4	(0)
2014–2015	FC Istres	16	(0)
2015–2016	Strasbourg	0	(0)
Total		101	(0)
- * Club domestic league appearances and goals

Olivier Blondel (born 9 July 1979) is a French former professional footballer who played as a goalkeeper.

== Career statistics ==
As of match played 20 November 2015

Appearances and goals by club, season and competition
Club	Season	League			National cup		League cup		Continental		Other		Total	
Club	Season	Division	Apps	Goals	Apps	Goals	Apps	Goals	Apps	Goals	Apps	Goals	Apps	Goals
Le Havre	1998–99	Ligue 1	0	0	0	0	0	0	—		—		0	0
Le Havre	1999–2000	Ligue 1	0	0	0	0	0	0	—		—		0	0
Le Havre	2000–01	Ligue 2	0	0	0	0	0	0	—		—		0	0
Le Havre	2001–02	Ligue 2	0	0	0	0	0	0	—		—		0	0
Le Havre	2002–03	Ligue 1	0	0	2	0	0	0	—		—		2	0
Le Havre	2003–04	Ligue 2	2	0	3	0	0	0	—		—		5	0
Le Havre	2002–03	Ligue 2	0	0	1	0	0	0	—		—		1	0
Le Havre	2005–06	Ligue 2	10	0	3	0	0	0	—		—		13	0
Le Havre	2006–07	Ligue 2	1	0	0	0	0	0	—		—		1	0
Le Havre	2007–08	Ligue 2	0	0	1	0	0	0	—		—		1	0
Le Havre	Total		13	0	10	0	0	0	—		—		23	0
Toulouse	2008–09	Ligue 1	1	0	0	0	0	0	—		—		1	0
Toulouse	2009–10	Ligue 1	13	0	0	0	0	0	3	0	—		16	0
Toulouse	Total		14	0	0	0	0	0	3	0	—		17	0
Troyes	2010–11	Ligue 2	37	0	3	0	1	0	—		—		41	0
Troyes	2011–12	Ligue 2	17	0	0	0	1	0	—		—		18	0
Troyes	Total		54	0	3	0	2	0	—		—		59	0
Toulouse	2012–13	Ligue 1	4	0	1	0	2	0	—		—		7	0
Toulouse	2013–14	Ligue 1	0	0	0	0	2	0	—		—		2	0
Toulouse	Total		4	0	1	0	4	0	—		—		9	0
FC Istres	2014–15	National	16	0	0	0	1	0	—		—		17	0
Strasbourg	2015–16	National	0	0	3	0	—		—		—		3	0
Career total			101	0	17	0	7	0	3	0	0	0	128	0
