= Mickaël Firmin =

French footballer (born 1990)

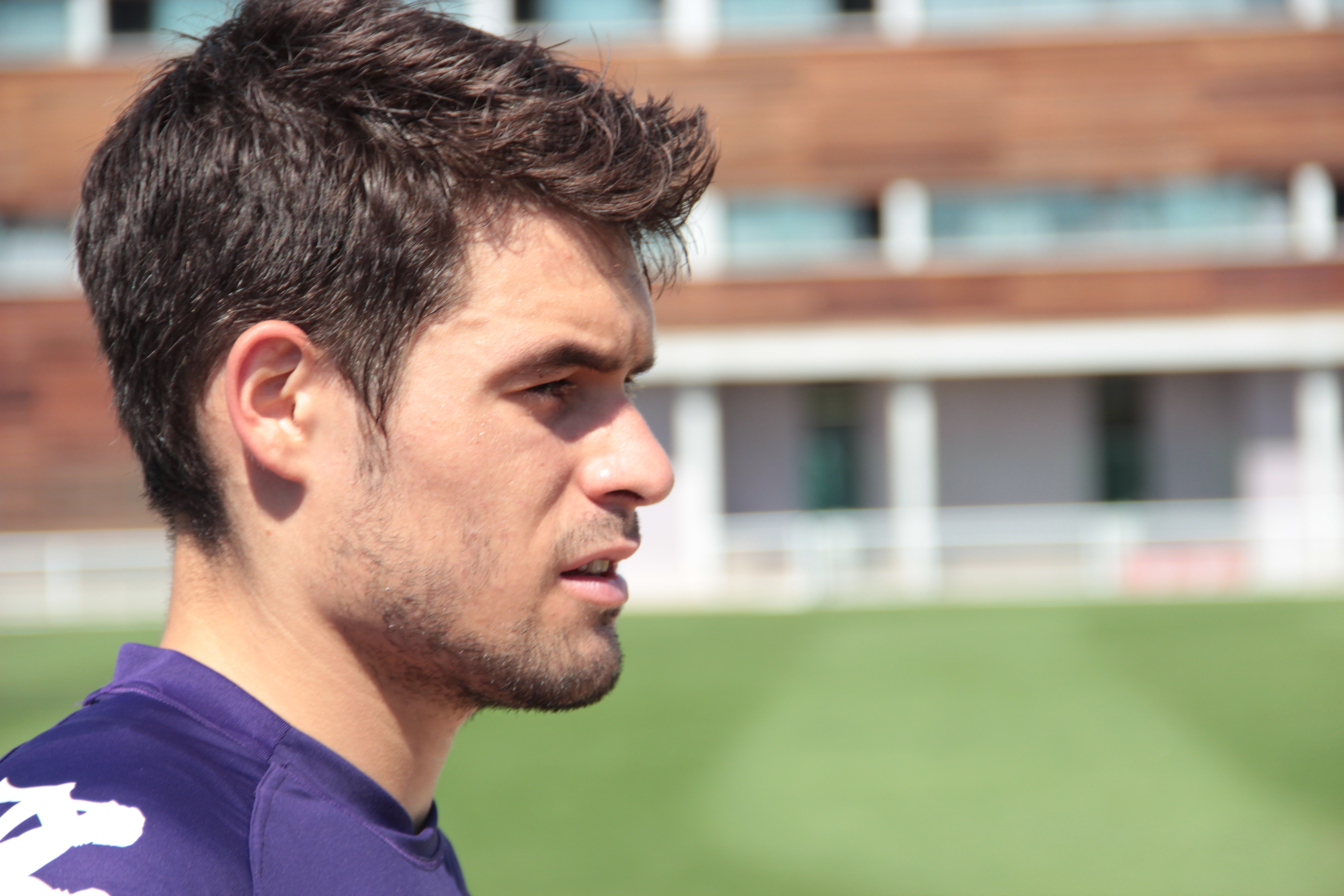

Personal information
- Date of birth: September 21, 1990 (age 36)
- Place of birth: Rodez, France
- Height: 1.79 m (5 ft 10 1/2 in)
- Position: Midfielder

Senior career*
Years	Team	Apps	(Gls)
2007–2014	Toulouse	7	(0)
2013	→ Épinal (loan)	13	(0)
2013–2014	→ Paris FC (loan)	7	(0)
2014–2016	Quevilly-Rouen	37	(1)
2016–2018	L'Entente SSG	52	(0)
- * Club domestic league appearances and goals as of 09:41, 11 February 2019 (UTC)

Mickaël Firmin (born September 21, 1990) is a French professional football player who most recently played for L'Entente SSG

He made his professional debut in the 2007–08 season in Ligue 1 for Toulouse FC.
