= Rafael Dias (footballer) =

Brazilian footballer

Personal information
- Full name: Rafael Dias do Nascimento
- Date of birth: February 12, 1983 (age 43)
- Place of birth: São Bernardo do Campo, Brazil
- Height: 1.80 m (5 ft 11 in)
- Position: Central defender

Team information
- Current team: CRAC

Youth career
- 2002: Goiás

Senior career*
Years	Team	Apps	(Gls)
2003–2009	Goiás		
2004	→ Murici-AL (loan)		
2004	→ CRAC (loan)		
2007	→ Sertãozinho (loan)		
2008	→ Sertãozinho (loan)		
2009	→ CRAC (loan)		
2009–2010	Caxias	3	(0)
2010	América-RJ	4	(0)
2011	Caldense		
2011–2012	Ferroviária		
2013	Itapirense		
2013–	CRAC		
- * Club domestic league appearances and goals

Rafael Dias do Nascimento or simply Rafael Dias (born February 12, 1983, in São Bernardo do Campo), is a Brazilian central defender. He currently plays for CRAC.

== Honours ==
- Goiás State League: 2006

== Contract ==
- 14 February 2005 to 12 February 2010
