= Cheikh M'Bengue =

French footballer (born 1988)

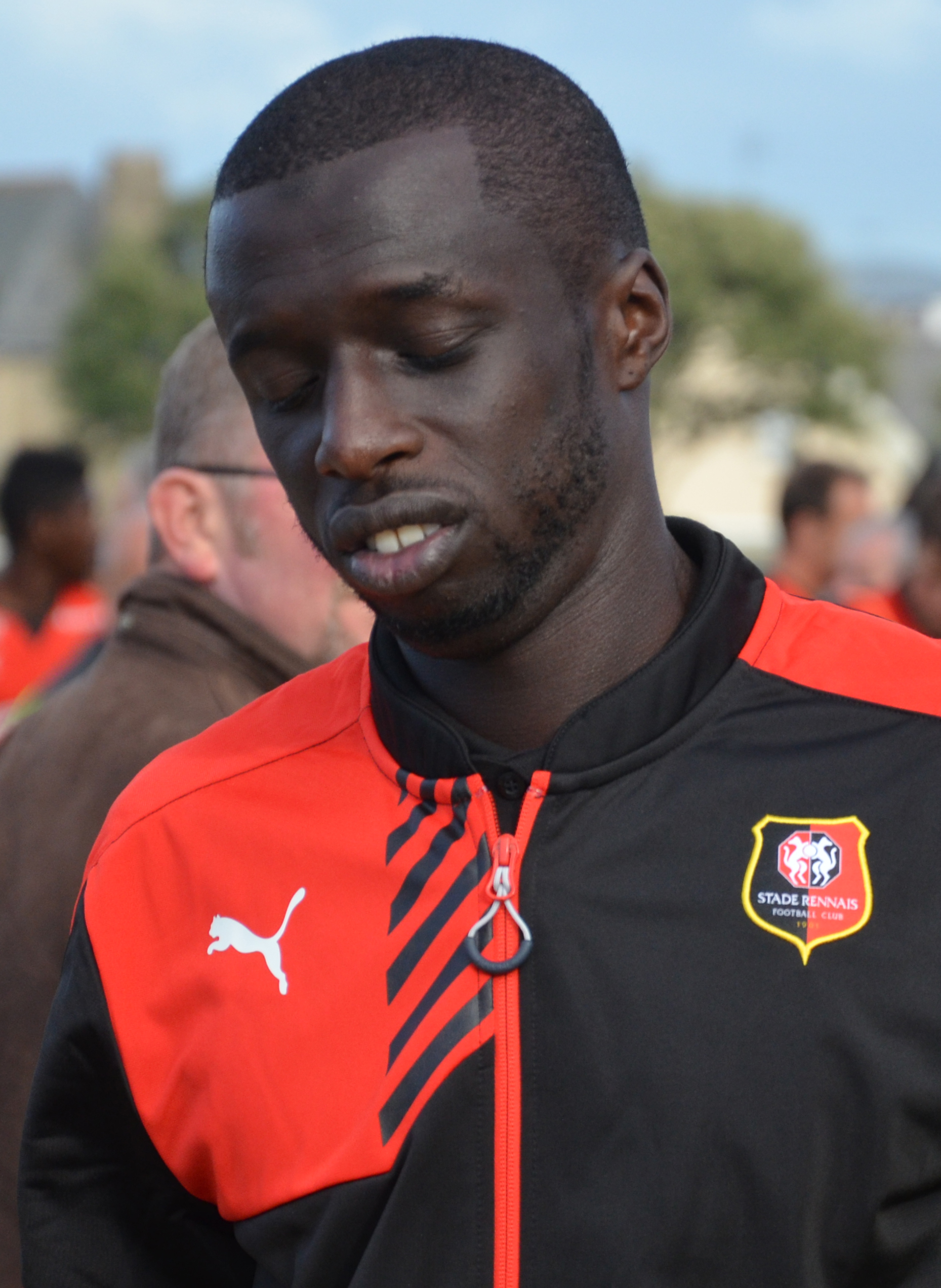
- M'Bengue in 2015

Personal information
- Full name: Cheikh Sidy Bouya M'Bengue
- Date of birth: 23 July 1988 (age 38)
- Place of birth: Toulouse, France
- Position: Left-back

Youth career
- 1994–1996: FA Roques
- 1996–2007: Toulouse

Senior career*
Years	Team	Apps	(Gls)
2007–2013	Toulouse	140	(2)
2013	Toulouse B	1	(0)
2013–2016	Rennes	80	(0)
2016–2019	Saint-Étienne	22	(0)
2019	Shenzhen	15	(0)

International career^{‡}
2008–2011	France U21	12	(0)
2011–2017	Senegal	26	(0)
- * Club domestic league appearances and goals as of 10:00, 21 August 2020 (UTC) ‡ National team caps and goals as of 07:06, 3 April 2017 (UTC)

Cheikh Sidy Bouya M'Bengue (born 23 July 1988) is a former professional footballer who plays as a left-back. He has played professional club football for Toulouse and Rennes. Born in France, he represented them at youth level before playing for the Senegal senior side.

== Club career ==
=== Toulouse ===
M'Bengue started out with his hometown club Toulouse when he was seven joining the club's youth team. He played frequently with the club's underage teams slowly ascending the ranks. Following the 2006–07 season, M'Bengue graduated from the club's youth academy and was promoted to the club's Championnat de France amateur squad. During the 2007–08 season, he earned call ups to the first team and eventually made his debut on 15 September 2007 against Marseille coming on as a substitute in a 2–1 victory. Two weeks later, he appeared as a substitute again in a 1–0 win over Sochaux. He made his first start the following week in a 2–0 defeat to Saint-Étienne.

After just a few matches into the 2007–08 CFA season, M'Bengue was embroiled in controversy. While playing in a match against the second team of AS Monaco, he committed a dangerous foul on an opposing player. He was swiftly given a yellow card, however, after realizing the severity of the player's injury, the referee decided to send off M'Bengue. The French Football Federation responded by suspending him 13 matches, which effectively made him ineligible for play until March 2008. Though M'Bengue was suspended by the federation, he was still allowed participation in UEFA-sanctioned matches. Since Toulouse were participating in the UEFA Cup that season, he made the bench several times and eventually made his first start in the team's 2–1 win over Russian club Spartak Moscow. That winter, M'Bengue signed his first professional contract agreeing to a three-year deal.

M'Bengue was one of the main bright spots during the club's successful play during the season. However, on 14 March 2009, he would be involved in another incident. Coincidentally, while playing against the Monaco senior team in a league match, M'Bengue committed another rough foul, this time on the Argentine midfielder Alejandro Alonso. He received a yellow card for the tackle and Alonso was eventually ruled out for the season. In response to the tackle, the FFF again suspended M'Bengue until 1 June, which ruled him out for the rest of the season.

=== Rennes ===
In the summer of 2013 M'Bengue declined to extend his contract with Toulouse that was expiring in 2014. Clubs such as Sunderland and Beşiktaş showed interest. However, on 25 August M'Bengue transferred to Stade Rennais and signed a deal that was to last until 2016. The transfer fee was expected to be around €2 million.

=== Saint-Étienne ===
On 20 July 2016, M'Bengue joined Saint-Étienne on a free transfer.

=== Shenzhen ===
On 9 February 2019, M'Bengue transferred to Super League newcomers Shenzhen.

== International career ==
Cheikh made his French under-21 debut on 19 November 2008 against Denmark in a 1–0 victory. He was a part of the 2009 Toulon Tournament squad that reached the finals; however, due to picking up an injury, he missed the match. In May 2011, he announced that he would represent the Senegal national team at senior international level after previously representing France at youth level. On 9 May 2011, the manager of the Senegal national team, Amara Traoré, confirmed that M'Bengue would be representing Senegal at senior international level, and on 4 June 2011, M'Bengue was cleared to play for Senegal, making his international debut later that month. In January 2017 he was part of the team's successful performance at the 2017 Africa Cup of Nations
