= Pantxi Sirieix =

French former professional footballer (born 1980)

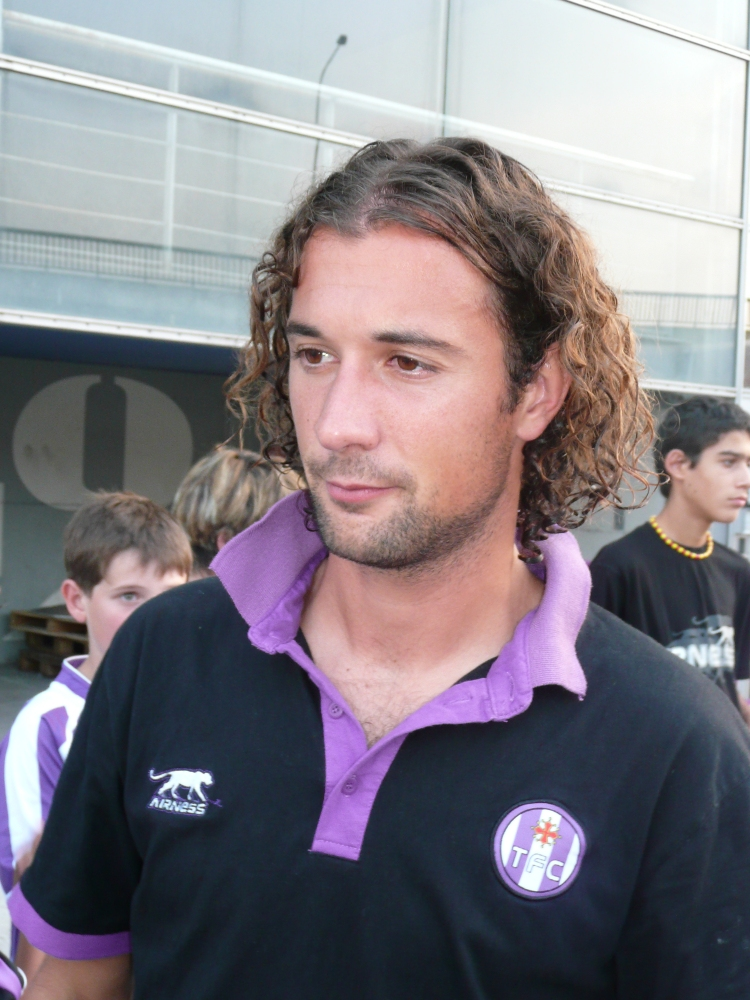
- Sirieix with Toulouse in 2008

Personal information
- Full name: Gilles François Pantxi Sirieix
- Date of birth: 7 October 1980 (age 46)
- Place of birth: Bordeaux, France
- Height: 1.80 m (5 ft 11 in)
- Position: Midfielder

Youth career
- Hasparren
- 1995–1999: Auxerre

Senior career*
Years	Team	Apps	(Gls)
1999–2004	Auxerre	28	(1)
2004–2017	Toulouse	221	(9)
Total		249	(10)

International career
2006–2011	Basque Country	3	(0)
- * Club domestic league appearances and goals

Pantxi Sirieix (born 7 October 1980) is a French former professional footballer who played as a midfielder. Having begun at AJ Auxerre, he spent the rest of his career at Toulouse FC where he played from 2004 till 2017.

== Career ==
Born in Bordeaux, Sirieix began playing professional football with Ligue 1 side AJ Auxerre.

After his contract ended, he joined Toulouse FC in 2004. The club's oldest and longest-serving player by 2012, he then extended his contract until 2014. On 18 May 2017, Sirieix announced his decision to retire at the end of the season.

Uncapped by France, Sirieix represented the Basque Country three times in unofficial appearances, being the only non-Spanish speaker in the squad on each occasion. Though born outside Greater Basque Country, he was eligible through his heritage and upbringing in the town of Hasparren in Labourd.
