= 2007–08 Championnat de France Amateur =

French football league season

The 2007–08 Championnat de France Amateurs season was the 10th edition of the competition since its establishment. The competition officially began on 11 August 2007 and ended in May 2008. The competition consists of 72 clubs spread into 4 parallel groups of 18.

It is open to reserve teams in France and amateur clubs in France, although only the amateur clubs are eligible for promotion to the Championnat National. The highest-placed amateur team in each pool are promoted, replaced by the 4 lowest-placed in the Championnat.

The champions each group were Pacy Vallée-d'Eure (Group A), Croix de Savoie (Group B), SO Cassis (Group C), and Bordeaux (Group D), though Aviron Bayonnais FC were promoted to the Championnat National as they are not a reserve side.

== Promotion and relegation from 2006–07 ==
Relegated from Championnat National to CFA

- US Raon-l'Étape to Groupe B
- Sporting Toulon to Groupe C
- AS Yzeure to Groupe D
- SO Châtellerault to Groupe D

Promoted from CFA to Championnat National

- Calais RUFC
- AC Arles
- Rodez AF
- Villemomble Sports

== Standings ==
Note: Unlike the higher leagues, a win in the CFA is worth 4 points, with 2 points for a draw and 1 for a defeat.

=== Groupe A ===
Last updated 24 May 2008

Pos	Team	Pld	W	D	L	GF	GA	GD	Pts	Promotion or relegation
1	Pacy Vallée-d'Eure (C, P)	34	18	8	8	51	31	+20	96	Promoted to Championnat National
2	FC Rouen	34	17	9	8	43	26	+17	94	
3	US Quevilly	34	16	8	10	49	38	+11	90	
4	USL Dunkerque	34	16	7	11	55	42	+13	89	
5	Lille OSC II	34	13	13	8	48	37	+11	86	
6	RCF Paris	34	15	4	15	42	45	−3	83	
7	SM Caen II	34	12	12	10	41	41	0	82	
8	AS Vitré	34	14	6	14	37	47	−10	82	
9	La Vitréenne FC	34	10	17	7	29	28	+1	81	
10	En Avant Guingamp II	34	12	10	12	46	38	+8	80	
11	AFC Compiègne	34	9	19	6	39	42	−3	80	
12	RC Lens II	34	12	9	13	47	48	−1	79	
13	Rennes II	34	12	8	14	40	39	+1	78	
14	Le Havre AC II	34	11	9	14	43	41	+2	76	
15	Stade Plabennec	34	10	10	14	30	44	−14	74	
16	US Lesquin (R)	34	10	9	15	43	46	−3	73	Relegated to CFA 2
17	ES Wasquehal (R)	34	9	8	17	32	43	−11	69	Relegated to CFA 2
18	Valenciennes FC II (R)	34	3	8	23	29	68	−39	51	Relegated to CFA 2

(C) Champions; (P) Promoted; (R) Relegated

=== Groupe B ===
Last updated 24 May 2008

Pos	Team	Pld	W	D	L	GF	GA	GD	Pts	Promotion or relegation
1	Croix de Savoie (C, P)	34	22	8	4	52	17	+35	108	Promoted to Championnat National
2	Besançon RC	34	19	11	4	61	20	+41	102	
3	Vesoul	34	17	10	7	61	42	+19	95	
4	FC Sochaux II	34	17	9	8	65	45	+20	94	
5	AS Saint-Priest	34	13	14	7	50	38	+12	87	
6	Lyon II	34	12	13	9	45	32	+13	83	
7	FC Montceau	34	13	9	12	36	33	+3	82	
8	AJ Auxerre II	34	12	9	13	52	48	+4	79	
9	RC Strasbourg II	34	11	12	11	42	43	−1	79	
10	Red Star FC	34	10	10	14	38	40	−2	74	
11	FC Metz II	34	10	9	15	39	46	−7	73	
12	Jura Sud Foot	34	8	14	12	31	37	−6	72	
13	FC Mulhouse	34	10	8	16	31	55	−24	71 (Note: FC Mulhouse were docked 1 point.)	
14	US Raon-l'Étape	34	10	7	17	37	61	−24	71	
15	AS Nancy II	34	6	16	12	28	36	−8	68	
16	SAS Épinal (R)	34	6	16	12	33	49	−16	68	Relegated to CFA 2
17	ASM Belfort (R)	34	7	11	16	30	50	−20	66	Relegated to CFA 2
18	RC Épernay (R)	34	6	8	20	25	64	−39	60	Relegated to CFA 2

(C) Champions; (P) Promoted; (R) Relegated

=== Groupe C ===
Last updated 24 May 2008

Pos	Team	Pld	W	D	L	GF	GA	GD	Pts	Promotion or relegation
1	SO Cassis (C, P)	34	21	6	7	49	31	+18	103	Promoted to Championnat National
2	Gap FC	34	17	12	5	58	28	+30	97	
3	Gazélec Ajaccio	34	15	12	7	37	32	+5	91	
4	AS Monaco II	34	14	10	10	47	33	+14	86	
5	US Marignane	34	14	9	11	41	32	+9	85	
6	US Albi	34	12	14	8	45	32	+13	84	
7	Saint-Étienne II	34	13	8	13	33	35	−2	81	
8	Sporting Toulon	34	13	7	14	36	36	0	80	
9	Hyères FC	34	10	16	8	33	26	+7	80	
10	ES Fréjus	34	14	4	16	41	43	−2	80	
11	CA Bastia	34	11	11	12	35	48	−13	78	
12	US Luzenac	34	11	10	13	49	51	−2	77	
13	Balma SC	34	10	9	15	34	44	−10	73	
14	Montpellier HSC II	34	10	9	15	33	43	−10	73	
15	ASF Andrézieux	34	9	14	11	31	33	−2	72 (Note: ASF Andrézieux were docked 3 points.)	
16	OGC Nice II (R)	34	8	13	13	36	41	−5	71	Relegated to CFA 2
17	Toulouse FC II (R)	34	5	14	15	31	49	−18	63	Relegated to CFA 2
18	EP Manosque (R)	34	8	4	22	33	65	−32	62	Relegated to CFA 2

(C) Champions; (P) Promoted; (R) Relegated

=== Groupe D ===
Last updated 24 May 2008

Pos	Team	Pld	W	D	L	GF	GA	GD	Pts	Promotion or relegation
1	Bordeaux II (C)	34	18	9	7	56	28	+28	97	
2	Bayonne FC (P)	34	15	13	6	47	30	+17	92	Promoted to Championnat National
3	Fontenay FV	34	13	15	6	40	33	+7	88	
4	AS Moulins	34	14	11	9	44	34	+10	87	
5	US Orléans	34	11	17	6	44	35	+9	84	
6	Le Mans II	34	14	8	12	55	49	+6	84	
7	PSG II	34	12	12	10	28	26	+2	82	
8	Genêts Anglet	34	13	9	12	42	37	+5	82	
9	Sainte-Geneviève	34	13	7	14	43	50	−7	80	
10	SO Châtellerault	34	12	9	13	45	52	−7	78 (Note: SO Châtellerault were docked 1 point.)	
11	AS Yzeure	34	11	11	12	38	46	−8	78	
12	ÉDS Montluçon	34	9	15	10	44	37	+7	76	
13	Stade Bordelais	34	9	14	11	40	48	−8	75	
14	US Moissy Cramayel	34	9	11	14	43	54	−11	72	
15	Aurillac FCA	34	8	11	15	34	46	−12	69	
16	FC Nantes II (R)	34	8	11	15	27	41	−14	69	Relegated to CFA 2
17	TVEC Les Sables (R)	34	8	10	16	29	45	−16	68	Relegated to CFA 2
18	AS Poissy (R)	34	7	11	16	40	48	−8	66	Relegated to CFA 2

(C) Champions; (P) Promoted; (R) Relegated
