= Alain Casanova =

French footballer (born 1961)

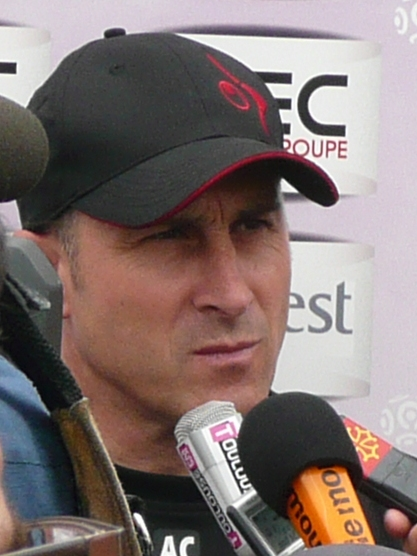
- Casanova as manager of Toulouse in 2008

Personal information
- Full name: Alain Casanova
- Date of birth: 18 September 1961 (age 65)
- Place of birth: Clermont-Ferrand, France
- Height: 1.78 m (5 ft 10 in)
- Position: Goalkeeper

Youth career
- 1970–1980: Cournon
- 1980–1983: Vichy

Senior career*
Years	Team	Apps	(Gls)
1983–1990	Le Havre	233	(0)
1990–1992	Marseille	0	(0)
1992–1995	Toulouse	76	(0)
Total		309	(0)

Managerial career
- 2008–2015: Toulouse
- 2016–2017: Lens
- 2018–2019: Toulouse
- 2022: Lausanne-Sport
- * Club domestic league appearances and goals

Alain Casanova (born 18 September 1961) is a French former footballer who played as a goalkeeper. He most recently was manager of Swiss side Lausanne-Sport.

== Career ==
Born in Clermont-Ferrand, Casanova played for Cournon, Vichy, Le Havre, Marseille and Toulouse. At Marseille, he made no professional appearances, but was on the bench at the 1991 European Cup Final, which the team lost to Red Star Belgrade in Bari.

On 30 May 2008, he was named as manager of former club Toulouse, after the sacking of Élie Baup. In his first season in charge, the team came fourth, and qualified for the renamed UEFA Europa League, while striker André-Pierre Gignac was the league's top scorer with 24 goals. The side also reached the semi-finals of the Coupe de France, where they lost 2–1 to Guingamp; in the 2009–10 Coupe de la Ligue, Toulouse reached the same round and were eliminated by the same score after extra time by Marseille. He was dismissed in March 2015, with the club three points from safety in 18th with nine games to play; he was Ligue 1's longest-serving incumbent manager at the time.

On 13 June 2016, Casanova was named as the new manager of Ligue 2 club Lens, succeeding Antoine Kombouaré on a two-year deal with the option of a third. He was sacked on 20 August 2017 after losing all four of the team's first matches of the new season.

On 22 June 2018, Casanova was named once again as the manager of Toulouse in Ligue 1, replacing Michaël Debève. He was sacked on 10 October 2019, with the side down in 18th place.

On 3 February 2022, he was confirmed as the new head coach of struggling Swiss Super League club Lausanne-Sport. Despite improving on their performance, he was unable to fend off the looming disaster and three rounds before the end of the season, the club's relegation was already confirmed with a twelve point deficit. On 22 May 2022, his contract at Lausanne was terminated.

== Managerial statistics ==
As of 30 June 2022

Managerial record by team and tenure
Team	Nat	From	To	Record				
Team	Nat	From	To	G	W	D	L	Win %
Toulouse	(France)	30 May 2008	16 March 2015	290	102	80	108	35.17
Lens	(France)	13 June 2016	20 August 2017	49	23	12	14	46.94
Toulouse	(France)	25 June 2018	10 October 2019	51	11	18	22	21.57
Lausanne-Sport	(Switzerland)	3 February 2022	30 June 2022	18	2	4	12	11.11
Total				408	138	114	156	33.82

== Honours ==
Le Havre

- French Division 2: 1984–85
