= 2018–19 Stade Malherbe Caen season =

SM Caen
2018–19 season
- Chairman: Gilles Sergent
- Manager: Fabien Mercadal
- Stadium: Stade Michel d'Ornano
- Ligue 1: 19th (relegated)
- Coupe de France: Quarter-finals
- Coupe de la Ligue: Third round
- Highest home attendance: 20,076 v. PSG (2 March 2019)
- Lowest home attendance: 11,631 v. Toulouse (18 December 2018)
- Average home league attendance: 16,654
- Biggest win: 6–0 at Viry-Châtillon (23 January 2019, CdF Ro32)
- Biggest defeat: 0–5 v. Saint-Étienne (16 March 2019)
Home colours	Away colours

The 2018–19 Stade Malherbe Caen season was the 106th season of the club since its creation in 1913, the 18th, in Ligue 1. Caen competed in three domestic competitions - Ligue 1, the Coupe de France, and the Coupe de la Ligue. The club finished the league season in 19th place and were relegated to Ligue 2 for the 2019–20 campaign, ending a spell of five consecutive seasons in the top flight.

== Players ==
=== Current squad ===
Note: Flags indicate national team as defined under FIFA eligibility rules; some limited exceptions apply. Players may hold more than one non-FIFA nationality.

No.	Pos.	Nation	Player
1	GK	FRA	Erwin Zelazny
2	DF	FRA	Paul Baysse
3	DF	FRA	Yoël Armougom
4	MF	CIV	Ismaël Diomandé
5	MF	GUI	Baïssama Sankoh
6	MF	CGO	Prince Oniangué
7	MF	TUN	Saîf-Eddine Khaoui
9	MF	SLO	Jan Repas
10	MF	MAR	Fayçal Fajr
11	FW	CHA	Casimir Ninga
12	MF	FRA	Claudio Beauvue
13	FW	FRA	Evens Joseph
14	DF	FRA	Jonathan Gradit
15	DF	BEN	Emmanuel Imorou
16	GK	FRA	Thomas Callens

No.	Pos.	Nation	Player
17	MF	FRA	Jessy Deminguet
18	FW	MAR	Yacine Bammou
19	FW	FRA	Malik Tchokounté
20	DF	FRA	Issa Marega
21	DF	FRA	Frédéric Guilbert
22	DF	SEN	Adama Mbengue
23	DF	FRA	Mouhamadou Dabo
24	DF	FRA	Alexander Djiku
27	FW	FRA	Enzo Crivelli
29	DF	HAI	Romain Genevois
30	GK	FRA	Brice Samba
32	DF	COM	Chaker Alhadhur
33	DF	FRA	Younn Zahary
40	GK	FRA	Paul Reulet
-	MF	FRA	Aly Ndom

== Competitions ==
=== Ligue 1 ===
==== League table ====
Pos	Team	Pld	W	D	L	GF	GA	GD	Pts	Qualification or relegation
16	Toulouse	38	8	14	16	35	57	−22	38	
17	Monaco	38	8	12	18	38	57	−19	36	
18	Dijon (O)	38	9	7	22	31	60	−29	34	Qualification to Relegation play-offs
19	Caen (R)	38	7	12	19	29	54	−25	33	Relegation to Ligue 2
20	Guingamp (R)	38	5	12	21	28	68	−40	27	Relegation to Ligue 2

Source: Ligue 1 and Soccerway
Rules for classification: 1) Points; 2) Goal difference; 3) Head-to-head points; 4) Head-to-head goal difference; 5) Head-to-head goals scored; 6) Head-to-head away goals scored; 7) Goals scored; 8) Away goals scored; 9) Most goals scored in single league match; 10) Fairplay ranking.
(O) Play-off winners; (R) Relegated

==== Results summary ====
Overall								Home						Away					
Pld	W	D	L	GF	GA	GD	Pts	W	D	L	GF	GA	GD	W	D	L	GF	GA	GD
38	7	12	19	29	54	−25	33	4	5	10	16	27	−11	3	7	9	13	27	−14

Last updated: 24 May 2019.
Source: Results

==== Results by round ====
Round	1	2	3	4	5	6	7	8	9	10	11	12	13	14	15	16	17	18	19	20	21	22	23	24	25	26	27	28	29	30	31	32	33	34	35	36	37	38
Ground	A	H	A	A	H	A	H	H	A	H	A	H	A	H	A	H	A	H	A	H	H	A	H	A	H	A	H	A	H	A	A	H	A	H	A	H	A	H
Result	L	D	D	W	D	L	D	W	L	D	L	L	D	L	D	L	D	W	D	L	L	L	L	L	D	D	L	L	L	W	L	L	W	W	D	W	L	L
Position	19	15	16	12	13	17	16	10	15	12	15	16	17	17	16	17	18	16	16	16	16	17	17	19	19	18	18	19	20	18	19	20	19	18	18	18	18	19

Source: Matches
A = Away; H = Home; W = Win; D = Draw; L = Loss

==== Matches ====
Win Draw Loss

12 August 2018 1	Paris Saint-Germain	3–0	Caen	Paris
21:00 CEST (UTC+2)	Neymar 10'; Rabiot 35'; Weah (yellow card) 89'	Report		Stadium: Parc des Princes; Attendance: 47,289; Referee: Benoît Bastien

18 August 2018 2	Caen	1–1	Nice	Caen
20:00 CEST (UTC+2)	Bammou (yellow card) 21' (goal) 52' (pen.); Imorou (yellow card) 80'	Report	Hérelle (yellow card) 51'; Makengo (yellow card) 76'; Ganago 82'	Stadium: Stade Michel d'Ornano; Attendance: 16,132; Referee: Éric Wattellier

25 August 2018 3	Nantes	1–1	Caen	Nantes
20:00 CEST (UTC+2)	Coulibaly (yellow card) 5'; Waris (yellow card) 69'; Sala 80' (pen.)	Report	Baysse (yellow card) 26', (red card) 79'; Crivelli 37'; Djiku (yellow card) 73'	Stadium: Stade de la Beaujoire; Attendance: 19,674; Referee: Hakim Ben El Hadj

1 September 2018 4	Dijon	0–2	Caen	Dijon
20:00 CEST (UTC+2)		Report	Crivelli 21'; Djiku (yellow card) 35'; Samba (yellow card) 77'; Beauvue (yellow card) 80' (goal) 90+4'	Stadium: Stade Gaston Gérard; Attendance: 13,382; Referee: Nicolas Rainville

15 September 2018 5	Caen	2–2	Lyon	Caen
17:00 CEST (UTC+2)	Fajr (yellow card) 30'; Beauvue 55' (pen.); Djiku (red card) 55'; Oniangué 73'; Sankoh (red card) 90+4'	Report	Mendy (yellow card) 19' (goal) 88'; Fekir 45'; Rafael (yellow card) 86'	Stadium: Stade Michel d'Ornano; Attendance: 17,676; Referee: Johan Hamel

22 September 2018 6	Saint-Étienne	2–1	Caen	Saint-Étienne
20:00 CEST (UTC+2)	Khazri (yellow card) 34' (goal) 48' (pen.); Kolodziejczak (yellow card) 49' (goal) 65'	Report	Guilbert (yellow card) 8'; Fajr 31'; Diomandé (yellow card) 35'; Mbengue (yellow card) 47'	Stadium: Stade Geoffroy-Guichard; Attendance: 23,895; Referee: Ruddy Buquet

26 September 2018 7	Caen	2–2	Montpellier	Caen
19:00 CEST (UTC+2)	Khaoui 10'; Bammou 64'; Ninga (yellow card) 79'; Fajr (yellow card) 89'	Report	Delort 37'; Le Tallec 52'; Mollet (yellow card) 62'; Hilton (red card) 83'; Sambia (yellow card) 90+2'	Stadium: Stade Michel d'Ornano; Attendance: 14,402; Referee: Antony Gautier

29 September 2018 8	Caen	1–0	Amiens	Caen
20:00 CEST (UTC+2)	Ninga 40' (pen.); Fajr (yellow card) 48'; Crivelli (yellow card) 90+4'	Report	Gnahoré (yellow card) 28', (yellow card) 69' (red card)	Stadium: Stade Michel d'Ornano; Attendance: 15,007; Referee: Benoît Bastien

7 October 2018 9	Marseille	2–0	Caen	Marseille
17:00 CEST (UTC+2)	Mitroglou 36'; Thauvin 45'; Gustavo (yellow card) 66'; Payet (yellow card) 66'; Ocampos (yellow card) 75'	Report	Crivelli (yellow card) 26'; Ninga (yellow card) 45+5'; Guilbert (yellow card) 66'; Baysse (yellow card) 66'; Djiku (yellow card) 90+2'	Stadium: Stade Vélodrome; Attendance: 55,935; Referee: Benoît Millot

20 October 2018 10	Caen	0–0	Guingamp	Caen
20:00 CEST (UTC+2)		Report		Stadium: Stade Michel d'Ornano; Attendance: 16,009; Referee: Hakim Ben El Hadj

27 October 2018 11	Lille	1–0	Caen	Villeneuve-d'Ascq
20:00 CEST (UTC+2)	Leão 56'	Report	Imorou (yellow card) 26'; Oniangué (yellow card) 33'	Stadium: Stade Pierre-Mauroy; Attendance: 33,362; Referee: Florent Batta

3 November 2018 12	Caen	1–2	Rennes	Caen
20:00 CET (UTC+1)	Guilbert (yellow card) 10'; Mbengue (yellow card) 34'; Crivelli 90+1'	Report	Grenier (yellow card) 26'; Hunou 60'; Sarr 69'; Del Castillo (yellow card) 84'	Stadium: Stade Michel d'Ornano; Attendance: 17,284; Referee: Amaury Delerue

11 November 2018 13	Bordeaux	0–0	Caen	Bordeaux
15:00 CET (UTC+1)	Palencia (yellow card) 20'; Lerager (yellow card) 28'; Kamano (yellow card) 44'; Tchouaméni (yellow card) 55'	Report	Sankoh (yellow card) 21'; Mbengue (yellow card) 29'; Guilbert (yellow card) 44'	Stadium: Matmut Atlantique; Attendance: 15,352; Referee: Nicolas Rainville

24 November 2018 14	Caen	0–1	Monaco	Caen
20:00 CET (UTC+1)	Ninga (yellow card) 38'; Baysse (yellow card) 52'	Report	Falcao 55'; Golovin (yellow card) 77'; Pierre-Gabriel (yellow card) 90+6'; Aït Bennasser (yellow card) 90+7'	Stadium: Stade Michel d'Ornano; Attendance: 15,013; Referee: Thomas Leonard

1 December 2018 15	Angers	1–1	Caen	Angers
20:00 CET (UTC+1)	N'Doye (yellow card) 5'; Capelle 50'	Report	Diomandé (yellow card) 10'; Fajr (yellow card) 53'; Beauvue 62'	Stadium: Stade Raymond Kopa; Attendance: 8,523; Referee: Willy Delajod

5 December 2018 16	Caen	1–2	Nîmes	Caen
19:00 CET (UTC+1)	Djiku (yellow card) 59'; Oniangué 90'	Report	Bozok 18'; Alakouch (yellow card) 70'; Savanier (yellow card) 89'; Paquiez (yellow card) 90+1'; Landre 90+5'	Stadium: Stade Michel d'Ornano; Attendance: 14,501; Referee: Florent Batta

9 December 2018 17	Strasbourg	2–2	Caen	Strasbourg
15:00 CET (UTC+1)	Martinez 5'; Mothiba 23'; Sissoko (yellow card) 85'	Report	Fajr 22'; Khaoui 80'; Zahary (yellow card) 90+2'	Stadium: Stade de la Meinau; Attendance: 25,048; Referee: Olivier Thual

18 December 2018 18	Caen	2–1	Toulouse	Caen
19:30 CET (UTC+1)	Khaoui 18'; Armougom (yellow card) 35'; Crivelli (yellow card) 84'; Fajr 90+9' (pen.)	Report	Gradel 44'; Cahuzac (yellow card) 49'; Amian (yellow card) 86'	Stadium: Stade Michel d'Ornano; Attendance: 11,631; Referee: Antony Gautier

22 December 2018 19	Reims	2–2	Caen	Reims
21:00 CET (UTC+1)	Suk (yellow card) 1', (goal) 7'; Abdelhamid (yellow card) 26'; Engels 53', (yellow card) 89'	Report	Guilbert (yellow card) 16'; Ninga 28'; Crivelli 45'; Armougom (yellow card) 64'; Tchokounté (yellow card) 89'	Stadium: Stade Auguste-Delaune; Attendance: 11,017; Referee: Jérôme Miguelgorry

11 January 2019 20	Caen	1–3	Lille	Caen
19:00 CET (UTC+1)	Crivelli (yellow card) 27'; Diomandé (yellow card) 42'; Guilbert (yellow card) 44'; Ninga 90+5'	Report	Pépé 8'; Soumaoro (yellow card) 14'; Leão 20'; Çelik (red card) 85'; Araújo 90+3'	Stadium: Stade Michel d'Ornano; Attendance: 16,018; Referee: Thomas Léonard

20 January 2019 21	Caen	0–1	Marseille	Caen
17:00 CET (UTC+1)	Crivelli (yellow card) 6'; Ninga (yellow card) 30'; Guilbert (yellow card) 45+1', (red card) 51'; Bammou (yellow card) 49'; Sankoh (yellow card) 89'	Report	Strootman (yellow card) 6'; Amavi (yellow card) 35'; Sanson 47'; Sarr (yellow card) 61'	Stadium: Stade Michel d'Ornano; Attendance: 19,607; Referee: Frank Schneider

27 January 2019 22	Montpellier	2–0	Caen	Montpellier
15:00 CET (UTC+1)	Laborde 51'; Baysse 59' (o.g.); Sambia (yellow card) 84'	Report	Ninga (yellow card) 41'	Stadium: Stade de la Mosson; Attendance: 11,001; Referee: Hakim Ben El Hadj

9 February 2019 24	Amiens	1–0	Caen	Amiens
20:00 CET (UTC+1)	Konaté 64'	Report		Stadium: Stade de la Licorne; Attendance: 9,373; Referee: Eric Wattellier

13 February 2019 23	Caen	0–1	Nantes	Caen
19:00 CET (UTC+1)	Guilbert (yellow card) 55'; Diomandé (yellow card) 59'; Armougom (yellow card) 71'; Djiku (yellow card) 78'	Report	Girotto (yellow card) 26' (yellow-red card) 34'; Pallois (yellow card) 34'; Rongier 80' (pen.)	Stadium: Stade Michel d'Ornano; Attendance: 16,627; Referee: Willy Delajod

17 February 2019 25	Caen	0–0	Strasbourg	Caen
15:00 CET (UTC+1)		Report	Sissoko (yellow card) 38'; Martinez (yellow card) 45'; Ajorque (yellow card) 68'	Stadium: Stade Michel d'Ornano; Attendance: 14,290; Referee: Thomas Leonard

24 February 2019 26	Toulouse	1–1	Caen	Toulouse
15:00 CET (UTC+1)	Sanogo (yellow card) 9'; Cahuzac (yellow card) 54'; Gradel 90+1'	Report	Diomandé (yellow card) 45+1' (yellow-red card) 90'; Crivelli 45+3'; Guilbert (yellow card) 58'	Stadium: Stadium Municipal; Attendance: 20,439; Referee: François Letexier

2 March 2019 27	Caen	1–2	Paris Saint-Germain	Caen
17:00 CET (UTC+1)	Crivelli (yellow card) 1'; Ninga 56', (yellow card) 57'	Report	Mbappé 59' (pen.), 87'; Alves (yellow card) 66'	Stadium: Stade Michel d'Ornano; Attendance: 20,076; Referee: Hakim Ben El Hadj

10 March 2019 28	Rennes	3–1	Caen	Rennes
17:00 CET (UTC+1)	Bourigeaud 40'; Grenier (yellow card) 43'; Hunou 58'; Niang 62'; Bensebaini (yellow card) 81'	Report	Ninga 20'; Armougom (yellow card) 25' (yellow-red card) 35'; Fajr (yellow card) 45+3'; Oniangué (yellow card) 70'	Stadium: Roazhon Park; Attendance: 23,676; Referee: Benoît Millot

16 March 2019 29	Caen	0–5	Saint-Étienne	Caen
20:00 CET (UTC+1)		Report	Hamouma 4'; Berić 20'; Nordin 30'; Ghezali 85'; Vada 90+1'	Stadium: Stade Michel d'Ornano; Attendance: 18,276; Referee: Florent Batta

31 March 2019 30	Monaco	0–1	Caen	Monaco
15:00 CEST (UTC+2)	B. Badiashile (yellow card) 3'	Report	Crivelli 23'; Ndom (yellow card) 39'; Ninga (yellow card) 52'	Stadium: Stade Louis II; Attendance: 7,031; Referee: Ruddy Buquet

6 April 2019 31	Nîmes	2–0	Caen	Nîmes
20:00 CEST (UTC+2)	Briançon (yellow card) 42'; Bouanga 85'; Gradit 90+4' (o.g.)	Report	Zahary (yellow card) 11'; Fajr (yellow card) 19'; Deminguet (yellow card) 42'; Djiku (yellow card) 90'	Stadium: Stade des Costières; Attendance: 12,183; Referee: Olivier Thual

13 April 2019 32	Caen	0–1	Angers	Caen
20:00 CEST (UTC+2)	Oniangué (yellow card) 53'; Crivelli (yellow card) 55'; Deminguet (yellow card) 65'; Djiku (yellow card) 83'	Report	Reine-Adélaïde 61'; Capelle (yellow card) 74'	Stadium: Stade Michel d'Ornano; Attendance: 17,175; Referee: Jérémy Stinat

20 April 2019 33	Nice	0–1	Caen	Nice
20:00 CEST (UTC+2)	Lees-Melou (yellow card) 16'; Dante (yellow card) 87'	Report	Djiku (yellow card) 26', (goal) 74'; Ninga (yellow card) 60'; Armougom (yellow card) 85'	Stadium: Allianz Riviera; Attendance: 17,092; Referee: Jérôme Miguelgorry

28 April 2019 34	Caen	1–0	Dijon	Caen
15:00 CEST (UTC+2)	Tchokounté (yellow card) 25'; Fajr 67'	Report	Balmont (yellow card) 40'; Sammaritano (yellow card) 44'; Lautoa (yellow card) 50'; Sliti (yellow card) 75'	Stadium: Stade Michel d'Ornano; Attendance: 19,004; Referee: Antony Gautier

4 May 2019 35	Guingamp	0–0	Caen	Guingamp
20:00 CEST (UTC+2)	Coco (yellow card) 90'	Report	Guilbert (yellow card) 30'; Tchokounté (yellow card) 51'; Moussaki (yellow card) 89'; Gradit (yellow card) 90'	Stadium: Stade de Roudourou; Attendance: 16,879; Referee: Jérôme Brisard

11 May 2019 36	Caen	3–2	Reims	Caen
20:00 CEST (UTC+2)	Ninga 14'; Fajr 40'; Guilbert 45'; Zahary (yellow card) 81'	Report	Chavarría (yellow card) 13'; Doumbia 37'; Zeneli 82' (pen.); Foket (yellow card) 89'	Stadium: Stade Michel d'Ornano; Attendance: 18,339; Referee: Johan Hamel

18 May 2019 37	Lyon	4–0	Caen	Décines-Charpieu
21:00 CEST (UTC+2)	Cornet (yellow card) 25', (goal) 54'; Marcelo (yellow card) 41'; Depay 50', 74'; Dembélé 64'; Rafael (yellow card) 84'	Report	Djiku (yellow card) 90+2'	Stadium: Parc Olympique Lyonnais; Attendance: 51,408; Referee: Amaury Delerue

24 May 2019 38	Caen	0–1	Bordeaux	Caen
21:05 CEST (UTC+2)	Ninga (yellow card) 79'	Report	Sankharé 19'; Otávio (yellow card) 78'	Stadium: Stade Michel d'Ornano; Attendance: 19,355; Referee: Clément Turpin

=== Coupe de France ===
5 January 2019 Round of 64	Red Star	0–1	Caen	Saint-Ouen
18:00 CET (UTC+1)	Chantôme (red card) 53'	Report	Bammou 81'	Stadium: Stade Bauer; Attendance: 2,999; Referee: Johan Hamel

23 January 2019 Round of 32	ES Viry-Châtillon	0–6	Caen	Viry-Châtillon
18:30 CET (UTC+1)	Yahya (yellow card) 42'; Marcilla (yellow card) 62'	Report	Bammou 4'; Khaoui 12', 30'; Tchokounté 79'; Mbengue 88'; Mouaddib 90'	Stadium: Stade Henri Longuet; Attendance: 2,725; Referee: Bartolomeu Varela

5 February 2019 Round of 16	SC Bastia	2–2 (a.e.t.) (3–5 p)	Caen	Furiani
21:00 CET (UTC+1)	Bocognano (yellow card) 8'; Poggi 70'; Kifouéti (yellow card) 77'; Santelli 117'	Report	Tchokounté 4'; Sankoh (yellow card) 27'; Gradit (yellow card) 41'; Guilbert (yellow card) 84'; Ninga 95'	Stadium: Stade Armand Cesari; Attendance: 10,003; Referee: Benoît Bastien
	Penalties
	Guibert (penalty scored); Coulibaly (penalty scored); Schur (penalty scored); Kifouéti (penalty missed)		(penalty scored) Fajr; (penalty scored) Djiku; (penalty scored) Diomandé; (penalty scored) Ninga; (penalty scored) Tchokounté

27 February 2019 Quarter-finals	Lyon	3–1	Caen	Décines-Charpieu
21:00 CET (UTC+1)	Denayer 26'; Cornet 49'; Dembélé (yellow card) 73'; Marcelo (yellow card) 77'; Depay 84'	Report	Mbengue (yellow card) 13'; Gradit (yellow card) 40'; Tchokounté (yellow card) 70'; Ninga 78'; Djiku (red card) 82'; Fajr (yellow card) 83'	Stadium: Parc Olympique Lyonnais; Attendance: 27,493; Referee: Ruddy Buquet

=== Coupe de la Ligue ===
31 October 2018 Third round	Dijon	3–1	Caen	Dijon
21:05 CET (UTC+1)	Saïd 3', 79' (yellow card) 65'; Sliti 7'; Yambéré (yellow card) 58'	Report	Khaoui 50'; Crivelli (yellow card) 56'; Fajr (yellow card) 58'	Stadium: Stade Gaston Gérard; Attendance: 10,193; Referee: Johan Hamel

== Goalscorers ==
Place	Position	Nationality	Number	Player	Ligue 1	Coupe de France	Coupe de la Ligue	Total
1	FW	(France)	27	Enzo Crivelli	4			4
1	MF	(Tunisia)	7	Saîf-Eddine Khaoui	3		1	4
2	MF	(France)	12	Claudio Beauvue	3			3
2	MF	(Morocco)	10	Fayçal Fajr	3			3
2	FW	(Morocco)	18	Yacine Bammou	2	1		3
3	MF	(Republic of the Congo)	6	Prince Oniangué	2			2
3	FW	(Chad)	11	Casimir Ninga	2			2
				Totals	19	1	1	21
