= 2017–18 Stade Malherbe Caen season =

SM Caen
2017–18 season
- Chairman: Jean-François Fortin
- Manager: Patrice Garande
- Stadium: Stade Michel d'Ornano
- Ligue 1: 16th
- Coupe de France: Semi-final (vs. Paris Saint-Germain)
- Coupe de la Ligue: Round of 16 (vs. Monaco)
- Top goalscorer: League: Ivan Santini (11); All: Ivan Santini (11)
- Highest home attendance: 20,249 vs Marseille (19 January 2018)
- Lowest home attendance: 15,144 vs Nice (19 November 2017)
Home colours	Away colours	Third colours

The 2017–18 Stade Malherbe Caen season was the 105th season of the club since its creation in 1913, the 17th in Ligue 1.

== Players ==
=== Current squad ===
Note: Flags indicate national team as defined under FIFA eligibility rules; some limited exceptions apply. Players may hold more than one non-FIFA nationality.

No.	Pos.	Nation	Player
1	GK	FRA	Rémy Vercoutre
3	DF	FRA	Florian Le Joncour
4	MF	CIV	Ismaël Diomandé
5	MF	GUI	Baïssama Sankoh
7	FW	FIN	Timo Stavitski
8	MF	BEL	Stef Peeters
9	MF	SLO	Jan Repas
10	MF	MAR	Youssef Aït Bennasser (on loan from Monaco)
11	MF	FRA	Vincent Bessat
12	FW	FRA	Ronny Rodelin
13	FW	CIV	Christian Kouakou
17	MF	COD	Jordan Nkololo
18	MF	CGO	Durel Avounou
19	MF	FRA	Jordan Leborgne

No.	Pos.	Nation	Player
20	FW	FRA	Hervé Bazile
21	DF	FRA	Frédéric Guilbert
22	DF	SEN	Adama Mbengue
23	DF	FRA	Mouhamadou Dabo
24	DF	FRA	Alexander Djiku
25	MF	FRA	Julien Féret (captain)
26	FW	CRO	Ivan Santini
27	FW	FRA	Enzo Crivelli (on loan from Angers)
28	DF	FRA	Damien Da Silva
29	DF	HAI	Romain Genevois
30	GK	CGO	Brice Samba
32	MF	FRA	Jessy Deminguet
33	DF	FRA	Yoël Armougom
40	GK	FRA	Matthieu Dreyer

=== Out on loan ===
Note: Flags indicate national team as defined under FIFA eligibility rules; some limited exceptions apply. Players may hold more than one non-FIFA nationality.

No.	Pos.	Nation	Player
—	GK	FRA	Paul Reulet (on loan to Boulogne)
—	DF	COM	Chaker Alhadhur (on loan to Châteauroux)
—	DF	BEN	Emmanuel Imorou (on loan to Cercle Brugge)
—	MF	FRA	Valentin Voisin (on loan to Avranches)

No.	Pos.	Nation	Player
—	FW	FRA	Yann Karamoh (on loan to Inter Milan)
—	FW	HAI	Jeff Louis (on loan to Quevilly-Rouen)
—	FW	SEN	Pape Sané (on loan to Auxerre)

== Competitions ==
=== Ligue 1 ===
==== League table ====
Pos	Team	Pld	W	D	L	GF	GA	GD	Pts	Qualification or relegation
14	Angers	38	9	14	15	42	52	−10	41	
15	Strasbourg	38	9	11	18	44	67	−23	38	
16	Caen	38	10	8	20	27	52	−25	38	
17	Lille	38	10	8	20	41	67	−26	38	
18	Toulouse (O)	38	9	10	19	38	54	−16	37	Qualification for the relegation play-off final

Source: Ligue 1 and Soccerway
Rules for classification: 1) Points; 2) Goal difference; 3) Head-to-head points; 4) Head-to-head goal difference; 5) Head-to-head goals scored; 6) Head-to-head away goals; 7) Goals scored; 8) Away goals scored; 9) Most goals scored in one league match; 10) Fair-play points
(O) Play-off winners

==== Results summary ====
Overall								Home						Away					
Pld	W	D	L	GF	GA	GD	Pts	W	D	L	GF	GA	GD	W	D	L	GF	GA	GD
38	10	8	20	27	52	−25	38	7	5	7	17	19	−2	3	3	13	10	33	−23

Last updated: 12 February 2018.
Source: Results

==== Results by round ====
Round	1	2	3	4	5	6	7	8	9	10	11	12	13	14	15	16	17	18	19	20	21	22	23	24	25	26	27	28	29	30	31	32	33	34	35	36	37	38
Ground	A	H	A	H	H	A	H	A	H	A	H	A	H	H	A	H	A	H	A	H	A	H	A	H	A	H	A	H	A	A	H	A	H	A	A	H	A	H
Result	L	L	W	W	W	L	W	W	L	L	W	L	D	W	D	L	L	D	L	L	W	L	L	W	D	D	L	W	L	L	L	L	D	D	L	L	L	D
Position	15	16	12	8	6	9	8	5	8	9	7	7	6	6	6	7	9	10	12	12	10	11	13	11	11	11	13	12	12	13	14	15	15	15	15	15	17	16

Source: Ligue1
A = Away; H = Home; W = Win; D = Draw; L = Loss

==== Matches ====
Win Draw Loss

5 August 2017 1	Montpellier	1–0	Caen	Montpellier
20:00 CEST (UTC+2)	Camara 59'; Roussillon (yellow card) 81'; Mbenza (yellow card) 90+1'	Report	Djiku (yellow card) 38'	Stadium: Stade de la Mosson; Attendance: 14,725; Referee: Thomas Leonard

12 August 2017 2	Caen	0–1	Saint-Étienne	Caen
20:00 CEST (UTC+2)	Delaplace (yellow card) 78'	Report	Théophile-Catherine (yellow card) 51'; Hamouma 67'	Stadium: Stade Michel d'Ornano; Attendance: 17,606; Referee: Stéphane Jochem

20 August 2017 3	Lille	0–2	Caen	Villeneuve-d'Ascq
15:00 CEST (UTC+2)	Pépé (yellow card) 64'; Amadou (yellow card) 65'	Report	Da Silva 5', (yellow card) 37'; Santini 69'; Guilbert (yellow card) 79'	Stadium: Stade Pierre-Mauroy; Attendance: 28,740; Referee: Karim Abed

26 August 2017 4	Caen	1–0	Metz	Caen
20:00 CEST (UTC+2)	Rodelin 50'; Aït Bennasser (yellow card) 60'; Da Silva (yellow card) 66'	Report	Nguette (yellow card) 32'; Mollet (yellow card) 90+1'	Stadium: Stade Michel d'Ornano; Attendance: 15,697; Referee: Jérôme Brisard

9 September 2017 5	Caen	2–1	Dijon	Caen
20:00 CEST (UTC+2)	Santini 5' (pen.); Bessat (yellow card) 65'; Mbengue (red card) 79'; Yambéré 81' (o.g.)	Report	Yambéré (yellow card) 4'; Marié 38'; Djilobodji (yellow card) 67'	Stadium: Stade Michel d'Ornano; Attendance: 15,328; Referee: Thomas Léonard

16 September 2017 6	Nantes	1–0	Caen	Nantes
20:00 CEST (UTC+2)	Girotto 73'	Report	Repas (yellow card) 26'; Aït Bennasser (yellow card) 87'	Stadium: Stade de la Beaujoire; Attendance: 20,245; Referee: Olivier Thual

23 September 2017 7	Caen	1–0	Amiens	Caen
20:00 CEST (UTC+2)	Santini 54' (pen.); Delaplace (yellow card) 59'	Report	Konaté (yellow card) 57'; Monconduit (yellow card) 73'	Stadium: Stade Michel d'Ornano; Attendance: 16,212; Referee: Hakim Ben El Hadj

30 September 2017 8	Rennes	0–1	Caen	Rennes
20:00 CEST (UTC+2)	Bensebaini (yellow card) 1'; Traoré (yellow card) 24'; Khazri (yellow card) 45+1'; Bourigeaud (yellow card) 75'	Report	Santini (yellow card) 21'; Bensebaini 34' (o.g.)	Stadium: Roazhon Park; Attendance: 18,689; Referee: Amaury Delerue

14 October 2017 9	Caen	0–2	Angers	Caen
20:00 CEST (UTC+2)	Peeters (yellow card) 60'	Report	Tahrat (yellow card) 14'; Tait (yellow card) 32'; Toko Ekambi 49', (yellow card) 58'; Fulgini 59', (yellow card) 75'	Stadium: Stade Michel d'Ornano; Attendance: 16,736; Referee: Benoît Millot

21 October 2017 10	Monaco	2–0	Caen	Fontvieille, Monaco
17:00 CEST (UTC+2)	Baldé 21'; Falcao 59' (pen.); Baldé (yellow card) 63'; Fabinho (yellow card) 67'; Jemerson (yellow card) 86'	Report	Guilbert (yellow card) 50'; Féret (yellow card) 62'	Stadium: Stade Louis II; Attendance: 8,040; Referee: Thomas Léonard

28 October 2017 11	Caen	1–0	Troyes	Caen
20:00 CEST (UTC+2)	Rodelin 30'; Guilbert (yellow card) 37'	Report	Traoré (yellow card) 26'; Vizcarrondo (yellow card) 51'; Cordoval (yellow card) 70'	Stadium: Stade Michel d'Ornano; Attendance: 16,908; Referee: Jérôme Miguelgorry

5 November 2017 12	Marseille	5–0	Caen	Marseille
17:00 CET (UTC+1)	Gustavo 43'; Thauvin 47', 81'; Sanson 52'; Mitroglou 76'	Report		Stadium: Stade Vélodrome; Attendance: 47,687; Referee: Nicolas Rainville

19 November 2017 13	Caen	1–1	Nice	Caen
15:00 CET (UTC+1)	Sankoh (yellow card) 25'; Djiku (yellow card) 82'; Rodelin 90+2'	Report	Lees-Melou 40'; Tameze (yellow card) 55'; Benítez (yellow card) 75'; Pléa (yellow card) 78'	Stadium: Stade Michel d'Ornano; Attendance: 15,144; Referee: Sébastien Desiage

25 November 2017 14	Caen	1–0	Bordeaux	Caen
20:00 CET (UTC+1)	Santini 23'; Genevois (yellow card) 62'; Mbengue (yellow card) 68'	Report	Sabaly (yellow card) 45'; Pellenard (yellow card) 83'; Mendy (yellow card) 88'; Jovanovic (yellow card) 90+4'	Stadium: Stade Michel d'Ornano; Attendance: 15,275; Referee: Karim Abed

28 November 2017 15	Strasbourg	0–0	Caen	Strasbourg
19:00 CET (UTC+1)	Koné (yellow card) 80'	Report	Djiku (yellow card) 24'; Genevois (yellow card) 29'	Stadium: Stade de la Meinau; Attendance: 22,175; Referee: Stéphane Jochem

3 December 2017 16	Caen	1–2	Lyon	Caen
17:00 CET (UTC+1)	Mbengue (yellow card) 60'; Santini 90'	Report	Cornet 10'; Fekir (yellow card) 36'; Díaz 54', (yellow card) 59'; Rafael (yellow card) 90'	Stadium: Stade Michel d'Ornano; Attendance: 19,455; Referee: Amaury Delerue

9 December 2017 17	Toulouse	2–0	Caen	Toulouse
20:00 CET (UTC+1)	Diop (yellow card) 13'; Da Silva 61' (o.g.); Gradel 74' (pen.)	Report	Djiku (yellow card) 68'; Da Silva (yellow card) 88'	Stadium: Stadium Municipal; Attendance: 12,613; Referee: Sébastien Moreira

16 December 2017 18	Caen	0–0	Guingamp	Caen
20:00 CET (UTC+1)	Guilbert (yellow card) 57'; Da Silva (yellow card) 59'	Report	Diallo (yellow card) 12'; Deaux (yellow card) 38'; Coco (yellow card) 69'; Rebocho (yellow card) 72'	Stadium: Stade Michel d'Ornano; Attendance: 17,173; Referee: Nicolas Rainville

20 December 2017 19	Paris Saint-Germain	3–1	Caen	Paris
20:50 CET (UTC+1)	Berchiche (yellow card) 19', (goal) 81'; Cavani 21'; Mbappé 57'; Thiago Silva (yellow card) 90'	Report	Peeters (yellow card) 13'; Delaplace (yellow card) 36'; Santini 90' (pen.)	Stadium: Parc des Princes; Attendance: 47,490; Referee: Karim Abed

13 January 2018 20	Caen	0–1	Lille	Caen
20:00 CET (UTC+1)	Djiku (yellow card) 36'; Aït Bennasser (yellow card) 44'; Vercoutre (red card) 44'; Da Silva (yellow card) 68'	Report	Thiago Maia (yellow card) 41'; Pépé 44'; Ballo-Touré (red card) 52'; Benzia (yellow card) 62'; Soumaré (yellow card) 69'	Stadium: Stade Michel d'Ornano; Attendance: 18,283; Referee: Johan Hamel

16 January 2018 21	Bordeaux	0–2	Caen	Bordeaux
19:00 CET (UTC+1)	de Préville (yellow card) 2'; Toulalan (yellow card) 9'; Youssouf (yellow card) 85'; Baysse (red card) 89'	Report	Stavitski (yellow card) 24'; Bessat (yellow card) 31'; Guilbert (yellow card) 51'; Djiku (yellow card) 67'; Sankoh (yellow card) 83'; Santini 89' (pen.); Rodelin 90+4'	Stadium: Nouveau Stade de Bordeaux; Attendance: 14,368; Referee: Stéphane Jochem

19 January 2017 22	Caen	0–2	Marseille	Caen
20:45 CET (UTC+1)	Guilbert (yellow card) 38'; Da Silva (yellow card) 58'	Report	Sarr (yellow card) 29'; Rolando (yellow card) 42'; Thauvin (yellow card) 53' (goal) 74'; Payet 55' (pen.)	Stadium: Stade Michel d'Ornano; Attendance: 20,249; Referee: François Letexier

27 January 2018 23	Saint-Étienne	2–1	Caen	Saint-Étienne
20:00 CET (UTC+01:00)	Ntep 35'; M'Vila (yellow card) 64'; Bamba 78'; Gabriel Silva (yellow card) 90'	Report	Rodelin 11'; Peeters (yellow card) 83'	Stadium: Stade Geoffroy-Guichard; Attendance: 21,559; Referee: Sébastien Moreira

4 February 2018 24	Caen	3–2	Nantes	Caen
17:00 CET (UTC+1)	Djiku (yellow card) 22'; Santini 35' (pen.); Da Silva 52', 80'	Report	Bammou 31', 58'; Dubois (yellow card) 33'; Diego Carlos (yellow card) 48'	Stadium: Stade Michel d'Ornano; Attendance: 16,121; Referee: Karim Abed

10 February 2018 25	Guingamp	0–0	Caen	Guingamp
20:00 CET (UTC+1)	Briand (yellow card) 34'	Report	Sankoh (yellow card) 56'; Genevois (yellow card) 87'	Stadium: Stade de Roudourou; Attendance: 13,988; Referee: Stéphane Jochem

17 February 2018 26	Caen	2–2	Rennes	Caen
20:00 CET (UTC+1)	Crivelli 6', (yellow card) 88'; Diomandé (yellow card) 58'; Da Silva 84'	Report	Sakho 9', 21'	Stadium: Stade Michel d'Ornano; Attendance: 16,083; Referee: Sandro Schärer

24 February 2018 27	Dijon	2–0	Caen	Guingamp
20:00 CET (UTC+1)	Balmont (yellow card) 11'; Da Silva 24' (o.g.); Tavares 70' (pen.)	Report	Da Silva (yellow card) 34'; Santini 45; Féret (yellow card) 70'; Guilbert (yellow card) 89'	Stadium: Stade de Roudourou; Attendance: 13,988; Referee: Stéphane Jochem

4 March 2018 28	Caen	2–0	Strasbourg	Caen
15:00 CET (UTC+1)	Crivelli 43', (yellow card) 83'; Rodelin (yellow card) 50'; Deminguet (yellow card) 79'; Crivelli (yellow card) 83'; Avounou (yellow card) 86'; Guilbert 87'	Report	Lala (yellow card) 55'; Blayac (yellow card) 86'	Stadium: Stade Michel d'Ornano; Attendance: 16,464; Referee: Johan Hamel

11 March 2018 29	Lyon	1–0	Caen	Décines-Charpieu
17:00 CET (UTC+1)	Mariano (yellow card) 46'; Traoré 63'	Report	Peeters (yellow card) 14'	Stadium: Parc Olympique Lyonnais; Attendance: 39,530; Referee: Clément Turpin

17 March 2018 30	Angers	3–0	Caen	Angers
20:00 CET (UTC+1)	Tait 10'; Toko Ekambi 43'; Oniangué 74'; Guillaume (yellow card) 78'	Report	Vercoutre (yellow card) 11'; Guilbert (yellow card) 14'	Stadium: Stade Raymond Kopa; Attendance: 10,342; Referee: Olivier Thual

1 April 2018 31	Caen	1–3	Montpellier	Caen
17:00 CEST (UTC+2)	Bazile (yellow card) 29'; Santini 87'; Guilbert (yellow card) 90+3'	Report	Sio 21'; Skhiri 23'; Sambia (yellow card) 26'; Ellyes Skhiri (yellow card) 30'; Sio 53'	Stadium: Stade Michel d'Ornano; Attendance: 17,686; Referee: Antony Gautier

7 April 2018 32	Amiens	3–0	Caen	Amiens
20:00 CEST (UTC+2)	Konaté (yellow card) 15'; Dibassy 20'; Gakpé (yellow card) 30'; Kakuta (yellow card) 34'; Konaté 53'; Dibassy (yellow card) 72'	Report	Genevois (yellow card) 21'	Stadium: Stade de la Licorne; Attendance: 9,506; Referee: Benoît Millot

25 April 2018 33	Caen	0–0	Toulouse	Caen
18:45 CEST (UTC+2)	Djiku (yellow card) 59'; Guilbert (yellow card) 90+2'	Report	Moubandje (yellow card) 90+2'	Stadium: Stade Michel d'Ornano; Attendance: 18,658; Referee: Nicolas Rainville

21 April 2018 34	Metz	1–1	Caen	Metz
20:00 CEST (UTC+2)	Da Silva 71' (o.g.); Diagne (yellow card) 81'; Roux (yellow card) 90'	Report	Deminguet 73'; Djiku (yellow card) 90'	Stadium: Stade Saint-Symphorien; Attendance: 16,518; Referee: Karim Abed

28 April 2018 35	Troyes	3–1	Caen	Troyes
20:00 CEST (UTC+2)	Vercoutre 7' (o.g.); Nivet 27'; Ben Saada (yellow card) 82'; Suk 84'	Report	Santini 4'; Djiku (yellow card) 6'; Aït Bennasser (yellow card) 29'	Stadium: Stade de l'Aube; Attendance: 14,019; Referee: Hakim Ben El Hadj

6 May 2018 36	Caen	1–2	Monaco	Caen
17:00 CEST (UTC+2)	Santini (yellow card) 33', (goal) 40'; Genevois (red card) 77'	Report	Sylla 12', 90+1'; N'Doram (yellow card) 50'; Raggi (yellow card) 66'	Stadium: Stade Michel d'Ornano; Attendance: 17,468; Referee: Ruddy Buquet

12 May 2018 37	Nice	4–1	Caen	Nice
21:00 CEST (UTC+2)	Balotelli 3', 11' (pen.); Saint-Maximin 36'; Seri 72'	Report	Guilbert (yellow card) 35'; Diomandé (red card) 54'; Kouakou 76'	Stadium: Allianz Riviera; Attendance: 22,570; Referee: Frank Schneider

19 May 2018 38	Caen	0–0	Paris Saint-Germain	Caen
21:00 CEST (UTC+2)	Féret (yellow card) 34'; Guilbert (yellow card) 45'; Deminguet (yellow card) 90'	Report	Weah (yellow card) 9'	Stadium: Stade Michel d'Ornano; Attendance: 19,999; Referee: Antony Gautier

=== Coupe de France ===
6 January 2018 Round of 64	SC Hazebrouckois	0–2	Caen	Hazebrouck
15:00 CET (UTC+1)	Aboubacar Camara (yellow card) 11'	Report	Rodelin 27'; Kouakou (yellow card) 50'; Armougom 82'	Stadium: Stade Auguste Demette; Attendance: 3,000; Referee: Stéphanie Frappart

23 January 2018 Round of 32	Canet Roussillon	1–1 (3–4 p)	Caen	Canet-en-Roussillon
17:30 CET (UTC+1)	Pierre Mahieu 12'; Maxime Ferry (yellow card) 100'	Report	Genevois 29', (yellow card) 78'; Peeters (yellow card) 53'	Stadium: Stade Saint-Michel; Attendance: 2,888; Referee: Olivier Thual

7 February 2018 Round of 16	Metz	2–2 (2–3 p)	Caen	Metz
17:30 CET (UTC+1)	Niane 85'; Roux 108'	Report	Stavitski 51'; Bazile (red card) 84'; Deminguet (yellow card) 96'; Diomandé 114'	Stadium: Stade Saint-Symphorien; Referee: Amaury Delerue

1 March 2018 Quarter-final	Caen	1–0	Lyon	Caen
21:00 CET	Diomandé 77'	Report		Stadium: Stade Michel d'Ornano; Attendance: 17,000; Referee: Antony Gautier

18 April 2018 Semi-final	Caen	1–3	Paris Saint-Germain	Caen
21:05 CEST (UTC+02:00)	Diomandé 43', (red card) 90'; Djiku (yellow card) 76'	Report	Berchiche (yellow card) 15'; Mbappé 25', 81'; Nkunku 90'	Stadium: Stade Michel d'Ornano; Attendance: 20,000; Referee: François Letexier

=== Coupe de la Ligue ===
24 October 2017 Third Round	Lorient	0–1	Caen	Lorient
18:45 CEST (UTC+@)		Report	Guilbert (yellow card) 28'; Peeters (yellow card) 38'; Kouakou 43', (yellow card) 69'; Diomandé (yellow card) 78'	Stadium: Stade du Moustoir; Attendance: 8,862; Referee: Karim Abed

12 December 2017 Round of 16	Monaco	2–0	Caen	Fontvieille, Monaco
21:05 CET (UTC+1)	Carrillo 33'; Raggi (yellow card) 40'; Falcao 85'	Report	Diomandé (yellow card) 24'; Santini (yellow card) 42'; Mbengue (yellow card) 45+1'	Stadium: Stade Louis II; Attendance: 4,834; Referee: Thomas Léonard

== Statistics ==
=== Appearances and goals ===
No.	Pos	Nat	Player	Total		Ligue 1		Coupe de France		Coupe de la Ligue	
No.	Pos	Nat	Player	Apps	Goals	Apps	Goals	Apps	Goals	Apps	Goals
Goalkeepers
1	GK	(France) FRA	Rémy Vercoutre	36	0	35	0	1	0	0	0
30	GK	(Republic of the Congo) CGO	Brice Samba	10	0	3+1	0	4	0	2	0
40	GK	(France) FRA	Matthieu Dreyer	0	0	0	0	0	0	0	0
Defenders
3	DF	(France) FRA	Florian Le Joncour	0	0	0	0	0	0	0	0
21	DF	(France) FRA	Frédéric Guilbert	42	1	36	1	4	0	2	0
22	DF	(Senegal) SEN	Adama Mbengue	21	0	18+1	0	1	0	1	0
23	DF	(France) FRA	Mouhamadou Dabo	0	0	0	0	0	0	0	0
24	DF	(France) FRA	Alexander Djiku	33	0	28	0	4	0	1	0
28	DF	(France) FRA	Damien Da Silva	36	4	32	4	3	0	0+1	0
29	DF	(France) FRA	Romain Genevois	26	1	22+2	0	2	1	0	0
33	DF	(France) FRA	Yoël Armougom	6	1	1+3	0	0+1	1	1	0
Midfielders
4	MF	(Ivory Coast) CIV	Ismaël Diomandé	17	3	8+3	0	4	3	2	0
5	MF	(Guinea) GUI	Baïssama Sankoh	30	0	15+11	0	2	0	2	0
8	MF	(Belgium) BEL	Stef Peeters	25	0	11+9	0	3	0	2	0
10	MF	(Morocco) MAR	Youssef Aït Bennasser	29	0	25+2	0	1	0	0+1	0
11	MF	(France) FRA	Vincent Bessat	25	0	18+6	0	1	0	0	0
17	MF	(Democratic Republic of the Congo) COD	Jordan Nkololo	13	0	4+6	0	0+1	0	1+1	0
18	MF	(Republic of the Congo) CGO	Durel Avounou	15	0	8+1	0	3+2	0	1	0
19	MF	(France) FRA	Jordan Leborgne	0	0	0	0	0	0	0	0
25	MF	(France) FRA	Julien Féret	42	0	36+1	0	2+3	0	0	0
32	MF	(France) FRA	Jessy Deminguet	16	1	5+7	1	2+1	0	0+1	0
Forwards
7	FW	(Finland) FIN	Timo Stavitski	11	1	3+6	0	1+1	1	0	0
9	FW	(Slovenia) SLO	Jan Repas	19	0	12+3	0	2+1	0	1	0
12	FW	(France) FRA	Ronny Rodelin	43	6	36+1	5	3+1	1	1+1	0
13	FW	(Ivory Coast) CIV	Christian Kouakou	24	2	7+12	1	3	0	2	1
20	FW	(France) FRA	Hervé Bazile	22	0	10+9	0	3	0	0	0
26	FW	(Croatia) CRO	Ivan Santini	39	11	31+1	11	5	0	1+1	0
27	FW	(France) FRA	Enzo Crivelli	14	2	9+2	2	0+3	0	0	0
Players transferred out during the season
6	MF	(France) FRA	Jonathan Delaplace	15	0	5+7	0	1	0	2	0
14	MF	(Haiti) HAI	Jeff Louis	1	0	0	0	0+1	0	0	0
15	DF	(Benin) BEN	Emmanuel Imorou	1	0	0+1	0	0	0	0	0

Last updated: 30 May 2018
Source: BDFutbol

=== Goalscorers ===
Place	Position	Nationality	Number	Players	Ligue 1	Coupe de France	Coupe de la Ligue	Total
1	FW	(Croatia)	26	Ivan Santini	11	0	0	11
2	FW	(France)	12	Ronny Rodelin	5	1	0	6
3	DF	(France)	28	Damien Da Silva	4	0	0	4
4	MF	(Ivory Coast)	4	Ismaël Diomandé	0	3	0	3
5	FW	(France)	27	Enzo Crivelli	2	0	0	2
5	FW	(Ivory Coast)	13	Christian Kouakou	1	0	1	2
6	DF	(France)	21	Frédéric Guilbert	1	0	0	1
6	MF	(France)	32	Jessy Deminguet	1	0	0	1
6	DF	(France)	33	Yoël Armougom	0	1	0	1
6	DF	(Haiti)	29	Romain Genevois	0	1	0	1
6	FW	(Finland)	7	Timo Stavitski	0	1	0	1
				TOTALS	25	7	1	33
