= 2019–20 Stade Malherbe Caen season =

Caen
2019–20 season
- Chairman: Fabrice Clément
- Manager: Pascal Dupraz
- Stadium: Stade Michel d'Ornano
- Ligue 2: 13th
- Coupe de France: Round of 32
- Coupe de la Ligue: First round
- Top goalscorer: League: Jessy Deminguet (6); All: Jessy Deminguet (6)
Home colours	Away colours	Third colours

The 2019–20 Stade Malherbe Caen season was the 107th season of the French football club since its creation in 1913. Following relegation from Ligue 1 in 2018-19, this was the club's first season back in Ligue 2 after five consecutive seasons in the top flight.

== Players ==
=== First-team squad ===
Note: Flags indicate national team as defined under FIFA eligibility rules; some limited exceptions apply. Players may hold more than one non-FIFA nationality.

No.	Pos.	Nation	Player
1	GK	FRA	Erwin Zelazny
2	DF	FRA	Steeve Yago
3	DF	FRA	Yoël Armougom
4	DF	SEN	Elhadji Pape Diaw
5	MF	GUI	Baïssama Sankoh
6	MF	CGO	Prince Oniangué
7	FW	USA	Nicholas Gioacchini
8	MF	FRA	Jessy Deminguet
9	FW	FRA	Benjamin Jeannot
10	FW	FRA	Jordan Tell
11	FW	FRA	Santy Ngom
12	MF	FRA	Jad Mouaddib
13	FW	FRA	Evens Joseph
14	FW	CIV	Caleb Zady
15	MF	SLO	Jan Repas
16	GK	FRA	Thomas Callens

No.	Pos.	Nation	Player
17	MF	FRA	Anthony Gonçalves
18	DF	FRA	Jonathan Rivierez (c)
19	FW	FRA	Malik Tchokounté
20	MF	COD	Durel Avounou
21	FW	FRA	Brice Tutu
22	DF	SEN	Adama Mbengue
23	FW	FRA	Herman Moussaki
24	DF	FRA	Hugo Vandermersch
25	MF	FRA	Godson Kyeremeh
27	MF	FRA	Azzeddine Toufiqui
28	DF	FRA	Anthony Weber
29	DF	FRA	Jessy Pi
30	GK	FRA	Rémy Riou
32	FW	FRA	Kélian Nsona
33	MF	FRA	Alexis Beka Beka
34	MF	FIN	Timo Stavitski

== Competitions ==
=== Ligue 2 ===
==== League table ====
Pos	Team	Pld	W	D	L	GF	GA	GD	Pts
11	Auxerre	28	8	10	10	31	30	+1	34
12	Nancy	28	6	16	6	27	26	+1	34
13	Caen	28	8	10	10	33	34	−1	34
14	Sochaux	28	8	10	10	28	30	−2	34
15	Châteauroux	28	9	7	12	22	38	−16	34

Source: Ligue 2
Rules for classification: 1) Points; 2) Goal difference; 3) Number of goals scored; 4) Head-to-head goal difference; 5) Fair play points

==== Matches ====
Win Draw Loss

26 July 2019 1	Sochaux	0–0	Caen	Sochaux
20:00 CEST (UTC+2)	Touré (yellow card) 84'	Report	Moussaki (yellow card) 35'; Gonçalves (yellow card) 84'; Gradit (yellow card) 90+3'	Stadium: Stade Auguste Bonal; Attendance: 6,429; Referee: Frank Schneider

5 August 2019 2	Caen	1–2	Lorient	Caen
20:45 CEST (UTC+2)	Pi (yellow card) 26'; Gonçalves (yellow card) 26'; Armougom (yellow card) 32'; Gradit (yellow card) 64'; Deminguet 90+1'	Report	Wissa 22'; Hamel 33'; Saunier (yellow card) 47'; Le Goff (yellow card) 90'	Stadium: Stade Michel d'Ornano; Attendance: 11,216; Referee: Sylvain Palhies

9 August 2019 3	AC Ajaccio	1–2	Caen	Ajaccio
20:00 CEST (UTC+2)	Avinel (yellow card) 45+1' (yellow-red card) 90+1'; Courtet 61'; Coutadeur (yellow card) 64'; Tramoni (yellow card) 83'	Report	Deminguet 4'; Diaw (red card) 27'; Sankoh 45+2' (pen.); Pi (yellow card) 65'	Stadium: Stade François Coty; Attendance: 3,117; Referee: Benoît Bastien

16 August 2019 4	Caen	0–0	Chambly	Caen
20:00 CEST (UTC+2)	Rivierez (yellow card) 38'; Tchokounté (yellow card) 90+4'	Report	Santelli (yellow card) 47'; Beaulieu (yellow card) 53'; El Hriti (yellow card) 87'; Gonzalez (yellow card) 89'	Stadium: Stade Michel d'Ornano; Attendance: 9,762; Referee: Arnaud Baert

23 August 2019 5	Niort	1–1	Caen	Niort
20:00 CEST (UTC+2)	Sissoko 53' (pen.)	Report	Sankoh 6'; Vandermersch (yellow card) 52'	Stadium: Stade René Gaillard; Attendance: 3,456; Referee: Olivier Thual

30 August 2019 6	Caen	0–3	Le Havre	Caen
20:00 CEST (UTC+2)		Report	Thiaré (yellow card) 8' (goal) 58'; Dina-Ebimbe 29'; Meraş (yellow card) 36'; Kadewere 90+3'	Stadium: Stade Michel d'Ornano; Attendance: 14,578; Referee: Thierry Bouille

13 September 2019 7	Troyes	2–1	Caen	Troyes
20:00 CEST (UTC+2)	Barthelmé (yellow card) 13'; Pintor 35'; Souaré (yellow card) 45'; Chambost 90+2'	Report	Armougom (yellow card) 66'; Sankoh 78'	Stadium: Stade de l'Aube; Attendance: 5,465; Referee: Bartolomeu Varela

21 September 2019 8	Caen	0–2	Lens	Caen
15:00 CEST (UTC+2)	Yago (yellow card) 17'; Weber (yellow card) 23'; Sankoh (yellow card) 40'; Pi (yellow card) 45+1'	Report	Rivierez 30' (o.g.); Radovanović (yellow card) 35'; Banza 83'	Stadium: Stade Michel d'Ornano; Attendance: 11,786; Referee: Johan Hamel

27 September 2019 9	Grenoble	1–0	Caen	Grenoble
20:00 CEST (UTC+2)	Djitté 18'; Elogo (yellow card) 83'	Report	Zady (yellow card) 36'; Gonçalves (yellow card) 60'	Stadium: Stade des Alpes; Attendance: 5,742; Referee: Bastien Dechepy

4 October 2019 10	Caen	1–1	Châteauroux	Caen
20:00 CEST (UTC+2)	Vandermersch (yellow card) 46'; Oniangué 60'	Report	Grange 68'	Stadium: Stade Michel d'Ornano; Attendance: 9,277; Referee: Éric Wattellier

18 October 2019 11	Caen	0–0	Valenciennes	Caen
20:00 CEST (UTC+2)	Pi (yellow card) 41'; Deminguet (yellow card) 65'	Report	Masson (yellow card) 35'; Brassier (yellow card) 40'; Ntim (yellow card) 67'	Stadium: Stade Michel d'Ornano; Attendance: 8,945; Referee: Bartolomeu Varela

25 October 2019 12	Paris FC	2–4	Caen	Paris
20:00 CEST (UTC+2)	Armand 47' (pen.), 72'; López (yellow card) 61'; Yohou (yellow card) 63'; Abdeldjelil (yellow card) 90+3'	Report	Rivierez (yellow card) 15'; Gioacchini 29'; Yago (yellow card) 57'; Gonçalves 60'; Pi 66'; Sankoh 90+3' (pen.)	Stadium: Stade Charléty; Attendance: 3,052; Referee: Mehdi Mokhtari

1 November 2019 13	Caen	2–1	Orléans	Caen
20:00 CET (UTC+1)	Cambon 33' (o.g.); Gonçalves (yellow card) 37'; Pi (yellow card) 70'; Yago (yellow card) 88'	Report	Thill (yellow card) 34'; Cambon (yellow card) 43'; Scheidler (yellow card) 63'; Perrin 82'	Stadium: Stade Michel d'Ornano; Attendance: 10,135; Referee: Sylvain Palhies

8 November 2019 14	Auxerre	1–1	Caen	Auxerre
20:00 CET (UTC+1)	Sakhi (yellow card) 41'; Touré (yellow card) 61'; Dugimont 72'; Coeff (yellow card) 73'; Michel (yellow card) 74'	Report	Pi (yellow card) 35'; Oniangué 47'; Gonçalves (yellow card) 68'	Stadium: Stade de l'Abbé-Deschamps; Attendance: 4,567; Referee: Cédric Dos Santos

22 November 2019 15	Caen	3–3	Le Mans	Caen
20:00 CET (UTC+1)	Oniangué (yellow card) 5'; Deminguet 26', 38', 56' (yellow card) 81'; Weber (yellow card) 52'	Report	Gope-Fenepej 18'; Créhin 74' (pen.); Kanté 79'; Fofana (yellow card) 82'	Stadium: Stade Michel d'Ornano; Attendance: 10,664; Referee: Bastien Dechepy

29 November 2019 16	Guingamp	1–1	Caen	Guingamp
20:00 CET (UTC+1)	Ngbakoto 35'; Valdivia (yellow card) 38'; Ngbakoto (red card) 80'	Report	Weber (yellow card) 44'; Tchokounté 79'	Stadium: Stade de Roudourou; Attendance: 9,224; Referee: Arnaud Baert

2 December 2019 17	Caen	1–0	Nancy	Caen
20:45 CET (UTC+1)	Gonçalves (yellow card) 28'; Gioacchini (yellow card) 35'; Yago (yellow card) 50'; Gioacchini 60'	Report	Dembélé (yellow card) 41'; El Kaoutari (yellow card) 64'	Stadium: Stade Michel d'Ornano; Attendance: 8,798; Referee: Johan Hamel

13 December 2019 18	Rodez	2–1	Caen	Rodez
	Bardy 48'; Roche (yellow card) 63'; Bardy 75'	Report	Vandermersch (yellow card) 24'; Oniangué (yellow card) 45+1'; Gonçalves (yellow card) 62'; Mbengue 73'; Jeannot (yellow card) 85'	Attendance: 2,793; Referee: Thierry Bouille

20 December 2019 19	Caen	0–0	Clermont Foot	Caen
	Jeannot (yellow card) 23'; Yago (yellow card) 59'	Report	Cissokho (red card) 53'; Ogier (yellow card) 58'	Stadium: Stade Michel d'Ornano; Attendance: 9,529; Referee: Pierre Gaillouste

13 January 2020 20	Lorient	2–1	Caen	Lorient
20:45 CET (UTC+1)	Hamel 6'; Wissa 69'	Report	Pi 16' (pen.)	Stadium: Stade du Moustoir; Attendance: 7,110; Referee: Nicolas Rainville

24 January 2020 21	Caen	0–1	AC Ajaccio	Caen
20:00 CET (UTC+1)		Report	Youssouf 90'	Stadium: Stade Michel d'Ornano; Attendance: 10,880; Referee: Bartolomeu Varela

31 January 2020 22	Chambly	0–1	Caen	Beauvais
20:00 CET (UTC+1)		Report	Zady 73'	Stadium: Stade Pierre Brisson; Attendance: 2,333; Referee: Aurélien Petit

4 February 2020 23	Caen	4–3	Niort	Caen
21:05 CET (UTC+1)	Pi 49' (pen.); Deminguet 56'; Jeannot 60', 79' (pen.)	Report	Vion 5'; Jacob 50'; Sissoko 72'	Stadium: Stade Michel d'Ornano; Attendance: 8,316; Referee: Mehdi Mokhtari

7 February 2020 24	Le Havre	1–1	Caen	Le Havre
20:00 CET (UTC+1)	Thiaré 33' (pen.)	Report	Oniangué 90'	Stadium: Stade Océane; Attendance: 12,125; Referee: Bastien Dechepy

14 February 2020 25	Caen	0–1	Troyes	Caen
20:00 CET (UTC+1)		Report	Pintor 90'	Stadium: Stade Michel d'Ornano; Attendance: 9,239; Referee: Nicolas Rainville

22 February 2020 26	Lens	1–4	Caen	Lens
15:00 CET (UTC+1)	Jean 11'	Report	Tchokounté 22' (pen.), 75'; Oniangué 32' (pen.), 72'	Stadium: Stade Félix Bollaert; Attendance: 27,711; Referee: Sylvain Palhies

28 February 2020 27	Caen	2–0	Grenoble	Caen
20:00 CET (UTC+1)	Pi 17' (pen.); Maubleu 18' (o.g.)	Report		Stadium: Stade Michel d'Ornano; Attendance: 9,845; Referee: Ruddy Buquet

6 March 2020 28	Châteauroux	2–1	Caen	Châteauroux
20:00 CET (UTC+1)	Grange 38'; Diarra 90'	Report	Tchokounté 27'	Stadium: Stade Gaston Petit; Attendance: 6,660; Referee: Aurélien Petit

=== Coupe de France ===
==== Seventh round ====
16 November 2019	ASI Mûrs-Erigné (7)	0–6	Caen (2)	Angers
18:00 CET		Report	Vandermersch 8'; Gioacchini 11'; Pi 18' (pen.); Rivierez 68'; Armougom 83'; Diaw 86'	Stadium: Stade Raymond Kopa; Attendance: 4,065; Referee: Romain Lissourgue

==== Eighth round ====
7 December 2019	C'Chartres Football (4)	0–1	Caen (2)	Chartres
14:15 CET		Report	Gonçalves 26'	Stadium: Stade Jacques-Couvret; Attendance: 4,000; Referee: Philippe Lucas

==== Round of 64 ====
4 January 2020	FC Guichen (5)	1–2	Caen (2)	Rennes
13:00 CET	Manounou 78'	Report	Gioacchini 10'; Rivierez 26'	Stadium: Stade du Commandant Bougouin; Attendance: 3,000; Referee: Jérémy Stinat

==== Round of 32 ====
19 January 2020	Montpellier (1)	5–0	Caen (2)	Montpellier
17:15 CET	Savanier 24' (pen.); Laborde 37'; Delort 40', 64'; Mollet 59'	Report		Stadium: Stade de la Mosson; Attendance: 4,697; Referee: Thomas Léonard

=== Coupe de la Ligue ===
==== First round ====
13 August 2019	Caen (2)	0–1	Nancy (2)	Caen
20:00 CEST		Report	Gueye 64'	Stadium: Stade Michel d'Ornano; Attendance: 7,807; Referee: Nicolas Rainville
