= 2021–22 Stade Malherbe Caen season =

Caen
2021–22 season
- Chairman: Olivier Pickeu
- Manager: Stéphane Moulin
- Stadium: Stade Michel d'Ornano
- Ligue 2: 7th
- Coupe de France: Seventh round
- Top goalscorer: League: Alexandre Mendy (16); All: Alexandre Mendy (16)
- Highest home attendance: Quevilly (18,003), 7 May 2022
- Lowest home attendance: Ajaccio (2,868), 24 Jan. 2022

The 2021–22 Stade Malherbe Caen season was the 109th season of the club since its creation in 1913. Caen participated in Ligue 2, the second division of French football, for the third year in a row after relegation from Ligue 1 in 2019, and also competed in the Coupe de France.

== First-team squad ==
As of 20 February 2022.

Note: Flags indicate national team as defined under FIFA eligibility rules; some limited exceptions apply. Players may hold more than one non-FIFA nationality.

| No. | Pos. | Nation | Player |
|---|---|---|---|
| 1 | GK | FRA | Rémy Riou |
| 3 | DF | FRA | Yoël Armougom |
| 5 | DF | RUS | Vladislav Molchan |
| 6 | MF | CGO | Prince Oniangué |
| 7 | FW | CPV | Nuno da Costa |
| 8 | MF | FRA | Jessy Deminguet (captain) |
| 9 | FW | FRA | Benjamin Jeannot |
| 10 | FW | CIV | Caleb Zady Sery |
| 11 | FW | FRA | Yoann Court |
| 12 | MF | FRA | Johann Lepenant |
| 13 | DF | CMR | Adolphe Teikeu |
| 15 | MF | CMR | Franklin Wadja |
| 16 | GK | FRA | Yannis Clementia |
| 17 | MF | FRA | Anthony Gonçalves |

| No. | Pos. | Nation | Player |
|---|---|---|---|
| 18 | MF | FRA | Jonathan Rivierez |
| 19 | FW | GNB | Alexandre Mendy |
| 20 | FW | FRA | Andréas Hountondji |
| 22 | DF | FRA | Brahim Traoré |
| 23 | FW | FRA | Steve Shamal |
| 24 | DF | FRA | Hugo Vandermersch |
| 25 | DF | TUN | Ali Abdi |
| 26 | FW | FRA | Mehdi Chahiri |
| 27 | DF | FRA | Ibrahim Cissé |
| 28 | MF | FRA | Djibril Diani |
| 33 | FW | BEL | Norman Bassette |
| 36 | DF | FRA | Stephen Ewange |
| 39 | FW | MAR | Ayoub Jebbari |
| 40 | GK | FRA | Sullivan Péan |

== Competitions ==
=== Ligue 2 ===
==== League table ====
| Pos | Team | Pld | W | D | L | GF | GA | GD | Pts | Promotion or Relegation |
|---|---|---|---|---|---|---|---|---|---|---|
| 5 | Sochaux | 38 | 19 | 11 | 8 | 47 | 34 | +13 | 68 | Qualification to promotion play-offs |
| 6 | Guingamp | 38 | 15 | 13 | 10 | 52 | 48 | +4 | 58 | |
| 7 | Caen | 38 | 13 | 11 | 14 | 51 | 42 | +9 | 50 | |
| 8 | Le Havre | 38 | 13 | 11 | 14 | 38 | 41 | −3 | 50 | |
| 9 | Nîmes | 38 | 14 | 7 | 17 | 44 | 51 | −7 | 49 | |

Source: Ligue 2
Rules for classification: 1) Points; 2) Goal difference; 3) Number of goals scored; 4) Head-to-head goal difference; 5) Fair play points

==== Results summary ====
| Overall | | | | | | | | Home | | | | | | Away | | | | | |
| Pld | W | D | L | GF | GA | GD | Pts | W | D | L | GF | GA | GD | W | D | L | GF | GA | GD |
|---|---|---|---|---|---|---|---|---|---|---|---|---|---|---|---|---|---|---|---|
| 38 | 13 | 11 | 14 | 51 | 42 | +9 | 50 | 9 | 3 | 7 | 30 | 19 | +11 | 4 | 8 | 7 | 21 | 23 | −2 |

Last updated: 15 May 2022.
Source: Ligue 2

==== Results by round ====
| Round | 1 | 2 | 3 | 4 | 5 | 6 | 7 | 8 | 9 | 10 | 11 | 12 | 13 | 14 | 15 | 16 | 17 | 18 | 19 | 20 | 21 | 22 | 23 | 24 | 25 | 26 | 27 | 28 | 29 | 30 | 31 | 32 | 33 | 34 | 35 | 36 | 37 | 38 |
|---|---|---|---|---|---|---|---|---|---|---|---|---|---|---|---|---|---|---|---|---|---|---|---|---|---|---|---|---|---|---|---|---|---|---|---|---|---|---|
| Ground | H | A | H | A | H | A | H | A | H | A | H | H | A | H | A | H | A | H | A | H | A | H | A | H | A | H | A | H | A | A | H | A | H | A | H | A | H | A |
| Result | W | W | L | D | W | D | L | D | L | W | L | D | D | L | D | L | D | W | D | L | L | W | D | W | L | W | L | W | D | W | W | W | D | L | D | L | W | L |
| Position | 2 | 2 | 5 | 8 | 6 | 7 | 9 | 9 | 11 | 9 | 12 | 9 | 10 | 12 | 12 | 15 | 17 | 13 | 14 | 14 | 15 | 14 | 15 | 12 | 14 | 12 | 13 | 10 | 10 | 7 | 6 | 6 | 7 | 8 | 8 | 9 | 7 | 7 |

Source: Ligue 2
A = Away; H = Home; W = Win; D = Draw; L = Loss

==== Matches ====
Win Draw Loss Fixtures

| 24 July 2021 1 | Caen | 4–0 | Rodez | Caen |
| 19:00 CEST (UTC+2) | Mendy 2' 19' (penalty scored) 38'; Lepenant (yellow card) 33'; Shamal 89' | Report | Célestine (yellow card) 36'; Bardy (yellow card) 74' | Stadium: Stade Michel d'Ornano; Attendance: 7,292; Referee: Guillaume Paradis |

| 31 July 2021 2 | Niort | 0–1 | Caen | Niort |
| 19:00 CEST (UTC+2) | Yongwa (yellow card) 33' (yellow-red card) 64' | Report | Wadja (yellow card) 25'; Deminguet (yellow card) 46'; Mendy 48' | Stadium: Stade René Gaillard; Attendance: 1,523; Referee: Abdelatif Kherradji |

| 7 August 2021 3 | Caen | 1–2 | Sochaux | Caen |
| 15:00 CEST (UTC+2) | Hountondji 90'; Inoussa (red card) 90+6' | Report | Aaneba (yellow card) 28'; Kalulu 63'; Virginus 90+1' | Stadium: Stade Michel d'Ornano; Attendance: 9,177; Referee: Frank Schneider |

| 25 August 2021 4 | Ajaccio | 2–0 | Caen | Ajaccio |
| 19:00 CEST (UTC+2) | Kouamé Botué 1'; Courtet (yellow card) 53'; Gonzalez 75'; Kalulu (yellow card) 85' | Report | Deminguet (yellow card) 53'; Lepenant (yellow card) 70'; Mendy (red card) 80' | Stadium: Stade François Coty; Attendance: 2,830; Referee: Rémi Landry |

| 21 August 2021 5 | Caen | 1–0 | Nancy | Caen |
| 19:00 CEST (UTC+2) | Mendy 17' | Report | Biron (yellow card) 90+1' | Stadium: Stade Michel d'Ornano; Attendance: 8,854; Referee: Olivier Thual |

| 28 August 2021 6 | Nîmes | 0–0 | Caen | Nîmes |
| 15:00 CEST (UTC+2) | Ueda (yellow card) 11'; Martinez (yellow card) 49' | Report | Abdi (yellow card) 10'; Riou (yellow card) 28' | Stadium: Stade des Costières; Attendance: 3,296; Referee: Florent Batta |

| 11 September 2021 7 | Caen | 1–2 | Pau | Caen |
| 19:00 CEST (UTC+2) | Rivierez 23'; Zady Sery (yellow card) 31' | Report | Daubin (yellow card) 37'; Gomis 42'; Armand 59'; Jean Lambert (yellow card) 71'; Gomis (yellow card) 76' | Stadium: Stade Michel d'Ornano; Attendance: 8,867; Referee: Alexandre Perreau Niel |

| 18 September 2021 8 | Bastia | 1–1 | Caen | Bastia |
| 19:00 CEST (UTC+2) | Santelli 13'; Bocognano (yellow card) 79'; Quemper (yellow card) 90' | Report | Wadja (yellow card) 71'; Mendy (penalty scored) 90+1 | Stadium: Stade Armand-Cesari; Attendance: 7,682; Referee: Guillaume Paradis |

| 21 September 2021 9 | Caen | 0–1 | Dijon | Caen |
| 20:00 CEST (UTC+2) | Abdi (yellow card) 64' (yellow-red card) 75' | Report | Younoussa (yellow card) 21'; Ecuele Manga (yellow card) 23'; Scheidler 29'; Pi (yellow card) 84' | Stadium: Stade Michel d'Ornano; Attendance: 8,391; Referee: Gaël Angoula |

| 27 September 2021 10 | Toulouse | 2–3 | Caen | Toulouse |
| 20:45 CEST (UTC+2) | Van den Boomen (penalty scored) 15', (yellow card) 17', (goal) 30'; Spierings (yellow card) 50' | Report | Wadja 8'; Mendy (yellow card) 32'; Diakité 39' (o.g.); Deminguet 45+1' | Stadium: Stadium de Toulouse; Attendance: 9,856; Referee: Bartolomeu Varela |

| 2 October 2021 11 | Caen | 1–2 | Valenciennes | Caen |
| 19:00 CEST (UTC+2) | Gonçalves (yellow card) 73'; Chahiri 90+2' | Report | Abdi 16' (o.g.); Robail 29'; Debuchy (yellow card) 31'; Robail (yellow card) 81' | Stadium: Stade Michel d'Ornano; Attendance: 8,490; Referee: Abdelatif Kherradji |

| 16 October 2021 12 | Caen | 2–2 | Le Havre | Caen |
| 19:00 CEST (UTC+2) | Mendy 31'; Chahiri 58'; Deminguet (yellow card) 79' | Report | Boutaïb 8'; Mayembo (yellow card) 58'; Boutaïb (yellow card) 66'; Bâ 68'; Fofana (yellow card) 70' | Stadium: Stade Michel d'Ornano; Attendance: 16,729; Referee: Hakim Ben El Hadj |

| 23 October 2021 13 | Dunkerque | 1–1 | Caen | Dunkirk |
| 19:00 CEST (UTC+2) | Tchokounté 85' | Report | Chahiri 62' | Stadium: Stade Marcel-Tribut; Attendance: 2,500; Referee: Aurélien Petit |

| 30 October 2021 14 | Caen | 0–1 | Grenoble | Caen |
| 19:00 CEST (UTC+2) | da Costa (yellow card) 32' | Report | Monfray 44'; Anani (yellow card) 84' | Stadium: Stade Michel d'Ornano; Attendance: 8,651; Referee: Arnaud Baert |

| 6 November 2021 15 | Amiens | 0–0 | Caen | Amiens |
| 19:00 CET (UTC+01:00) | Lusamba (yellow card) 45'; Pavlović (yellow card) 82' | Report | Rivierez (yellow card) 29' da Costa (yellow card) 65'; Abdi (yellow card) 81'; Fouda (yellow card) 90+3' | Stadium: Stade de la Licorne; Attendance: 8,790; Referee: Alexandre Perreau Niel |

| 20 November 2021 16 | Caen | 0–1 | Paris FC | Caen |
| 19:00 CET (UTC+01:00) | Wadja (yellow card) 21'; Mendy (yellow card) 69' | Report | Gory 64'; López (yellow card) 73'; Guilavogui (yellow card) 83' | Stadium: Stade Michel d'Ornano; Attendance: 11,635; Referee: Marc Bollengier |

| 4 December 2021 17 | Auxerre | 2–2 | Caen | Auxerre |
| 15:00 CET (UTC+1) | Riou 45+1' (o.g.); Pellenard (red card) 53'; Jubal 81' | Report | Mendy 13'; Vandermersch 76', (yellow card) 90+1' | Stadium: Stade de l'Abbé-Deschamps; Attendance: 6,366; Referee: Jérôme Miguelgorry |

| 11 December 2021 18 | Caen | 2–0 | Guingamp | Caen |
| 19:00 CET (UTC+1) | da Costa 14'; Lepenant (yellow card) 65'; Mendy (penalty scored) 81' | Report | Roux (yellow card) 28' (yellow-red card) 78'; Ba (yellow card) 32'; Merghem (yellow card) 42'; Lemonnier (yellow card) 73'; Ndenbe (red card) 80' | Stadium: Stade Michel d'Ornano; Attendance: 9,834; Referee: Mathieu Vernice |

| 21 December 2021 19 | Quevilly-Rouen | 2–2 | Caen | Rouen |
| 20:45 CET (UTC+1) | Sangaré (yellow card) 40'; Padovani 90+1'; Sidibé 90+2' | Report | Oniangué 25' da Costa 49'; Wadja (yellow card) 90'; Mendy (red card) 90+4' | Stadium: Stade Robert Diochon; Attendance: 5,058; Referee: Alexandre Perreau Niel |

| 28 January 2022 20 | Caen | 0–2 | Niort | Caen |
| 19:00 CET (UTC+1) | Gonçalves (yellow card) 52' da Costa (yellow card) 66'; Shamal (yellow card) 85'; Court (red card) 90+5' | Report | Sissoko 4'; Moutachy (yellow card) 7'; Cassubie (yellow card) 45+'; Sissoko 48' | Stadium: Stade Michel d'Ornano; Attendance: 3,326; Referee: Arnaud Baert |

| 15 January 2022 21 | Sochaux | 3–2 | Caen | Montbéliard |
| 20:00 CET (UTC+1) | Senaya (yellow card) 14'; Henry (yellow card) 16'; Kitala (yellow card) 40'; Kalulu 52', (yellow card) 90+2'; Mauricio (yellow card) 64'; Virginius 66'; Ndour (yellow card) 83'; Do Couto (yellow card) 90+2', (goal) 90+3' | Report | Gonçalves (yellow card) 13' da Costa 17', (yellow card) 37' (yellow-red card) 60'; Deminguet (penalty scored) 28', (yellow card) 67'; Rivierez (yellow card) 69'; Teikeu (yellow card) 90+4' | Stadium: Stade Auguste Bonal; Attendance: 5,000; Referee: Arnaud Petit |

| 24 January 2022 22 | Caen | 2–0 | Ajaccio | Caen |
| 20:45 CET (UTC+1) | Mendy (penalty scored) 65'; Vandermersch (yellow card) 80'; Lepenant (yellow card) 86'; Deminguet 90' | Report | | Stadium: Stade Michel d'Ornano; Attendance: 2,868; Referee: Jérémy Stinat |

| 5 February 2022 23 | Nancy | 1–1 | Caen | Nancy |
| 19:00 CET (UTC+1) | El Aynaoui (yellow card) 35'; Biron 55' | Report | Deminguet (yellow card) 9'; Rivierez (yellow card) 45'; Mendy 63' | Stadium: Stade Marcel Picot; Attendance: 5,803; Referee: Rémi Landry |

| 12 February 2022 24 | Caen | 4–0 | Nîmes | Caen |
| 19:00 CET (UTC+1) | da Costa 9'; Mendy 19' (penalty scored) 90+4'; Abdi 56'; Traoré (yellow card) 81' | Report | Koné (yellow card) 24'; Mbow (red card) 45+4' | Stadium: Stade Michel d'Ornano; Attendance: 8,075; Referee: Olivier Thual |

| 19 February 2022 25 | Pau | 1–0 | Caen | Pau |
| 19:00 CET (UTC+1) | Daubin (yellow card) 54'; Koffi 59' | Report | Lepenant (yellow card) 69'; Oniangue (yellow card) 73'; Deminguet (yellow card) 79'; Abdi (yellow card) 90' | Stadium: Nouste Camp; Attendance: 3,310; Referee: Nicolas Rainville |

| 26 February 2022 26 | Caen | 2–1 | Bastia | Caen |
| 19:00 CET (UTC+1) | da Costa 27', 53'; Lepenant (yellow card) 65' | Report | Santelli (yellow card) 7'; Salles-Lamonge 15'; Palun (yellow card) 41'; Le Cardinal (yellow card) 75'; Vincent (yellow card) 90+4' | Stadium: Stade Michel d'Ornano; Attendance: 8,980; Referee: Johan Hamel |

| 5 March 2022 27 | Dijon | 1–0 | Caen | Dijon |
| 19:00 CET (UTC+1) | Le Bihan 37'; Deaux (yellow card) 61' | Report | Vandermersch (yellow card) 64' | Stadium: Stade Gaston Gérard; Attendance: 6,995; Referee: Frank Schneider |

| 12 March 2022 28 | Caen | 4–1 | Toulouse | Caen |
| 19:00 CET (UTC+1) | Mendy 18'; Court 31'; Oniangué 51' da Costa 71' | Report | Spierings (yellow card) 32'; Ratão 48' | Stadium: Stade Michel d'Ornano; Attendance: 11,429; Referee: Guillaume Paradis |

| 15 March 2022 29 | Valenciennes | 1–1 | Caen | Valenciennes |
| 19:00 CET (UTC+1) | Ntim 24'; Cuffaut (yellow card) 42'; Kaba (yellow card) 43'; Yatabaré (yellow card) 59'; Masson (yellow card) 89' | Report | da Costa 13'; Abdi (yellow card) 59'; Cissé (yellow card) 88' | Stadium: Stade du Hainaut; Attendance: 6,457; Referee: Abdelatif Kherradji |

| 19 March 2022 30 | Le Havre | 2–4 | Caen | Le Havre |
| 15:00 CET (UTC+1) | Boura (yellow card) 8'; Richardson (yellow card) 44'; Abline (yellow card) 58', (goal) 87'; Thiaré 71', (yellow card) 76'; Kumbedi (yellow card) 77' (yellow-red card) 78'; Cornette (yellow card) 83'; Gibaud (yellow card) 89'; Touré (yellow card) 90+1'; Bonnet (yellow card) 90+5' | Report | da Costa (yellow card) 34', (goal) 38'; Lepenant (yellow card) 50'; Diani (yellow card) 56'; Oniangué (yellow card) 64'; Deminguet (penalty scored) 81', (yellow card) 82', (goal) 90+2'; Jeannot 85' | Stadium: Stade Océane; Attendance: 18,693; Referee: Mathieu Vernice |

| 2 April 2022 31 | Caen | 2–1 | Dunkerque | Caen |
| 19:00 CEST (UTC+2) | Court 36', (yellow card) 43'; Traoré (yellow card) 39'; Mendy 50' | Report | Brahimi (yellow card) 29'; Dudouit (yellow card) 51'; Tchokounté 71' | Stadium: Stade Michel d'Ornano; Attendance: 10,720; Referee: Willy Delajod |

| 9 April 2022 32 | Grenoble | 0–2 | Caen | Grenoble |
| 19:00 CEST (UTC+2) | Bunjaku (yellow card) 88' | Report | Court (yellow card) 80'; Mendy 83'; Jeannot 90+1' | Stadium: Stade des Alpes; Attendance: 3,937; Referee: Jérôme Miguelgorry |

| 16 April 2022 33 | Caen | 1–1 | Amiens | Caen |
| 19:00 CEST (UTC+2) | Oniangué 52' | Report | Gene (yellow card) 56' (yellow-red card) 77'; Arokodare 59'; Zungu (yellow card) 74'; Pavlović (yellow card) 89' | Stadium: Stade Michel d'Ornano; Attendance: 11,263; Referee: Bartolomeu Varela |

| 19 April 2022 34 | Paris FC | 1–0 | Caen | Paris |
| 20:00 CEST (UTC+2) | Caddy (yellow card) 17'; Name 26'; Mandouki (yellow card) 42' | Report | Sy (yellow card) 58'; Mendy (yellow card) 73'; Diani (yellow card) 89' | Stadium: Stade Sébastien Charléty; Attendance: 3,423; Referee: Rémi Landry |

| 23 April 2022 35 | Caen | 1–1 | Auxerre | Caen |
| 15:00 CEST (UTC+2) | Cissé (yellow card) 41'; Abdi (yellow card) 83'; Deminguet 89' da Costa (yellow card) 90' | Report | Charbonnier 40'; Autret (red card) 48'; Arcus (yellow card) 55'; Ndom (yellow card) 78' | Stadium: Stade Michel d'Ornano; Attendance: 14,935; Referee: Pierre Legat |

| 30 April 2022 36 | Guingamp | 2–1 | Caen | Guingamp |
| 19:00 CEST (UTC+2) | Pierrot 71'; Sivis (yellow card) 77'; Merghem 81' | Report | Diani 14'; Vandermersch (yellow card) 56'; Mendy (yellow card) 63'; Court (yellow card) 68' | Stadium: Stade de Roudourou; Attendance: 10,950; Referee: Arnaud Baert |

| 7 May 2022 37 | Caen | 2–0 | Quevilly-Rouen | Caen |
| 19:00 CEST (UTC+2) | Vandermersch (yellow card) 27'; Court (yellow card) 33'; Abdi (yellow card) 49', (goal) 90+2'; Jeannot 77', (yellow card) 78' | Report | Boé-Kane (yellow card) 13'; Sidibé (yellow card) 61' | Stadium: Stade Michel d'Ornano; Attendance: 18,003; Referee: Frank Schneider |

| 14 May 2022 38 | Rodez | 2–0 | Caen | Rodez |
| 19:00 CEST (UTC+2) | Danger (yellow card) 23'; Célestine 52'; Kerouedan 90' | Report | Abdi (yellow card) 12' | Stadium: Stade Paul-Lignon; Attendance: 1,667; Referee: Pierre Gaillouste |
