= Erwin Zelazny =

French footballer (born 1991)

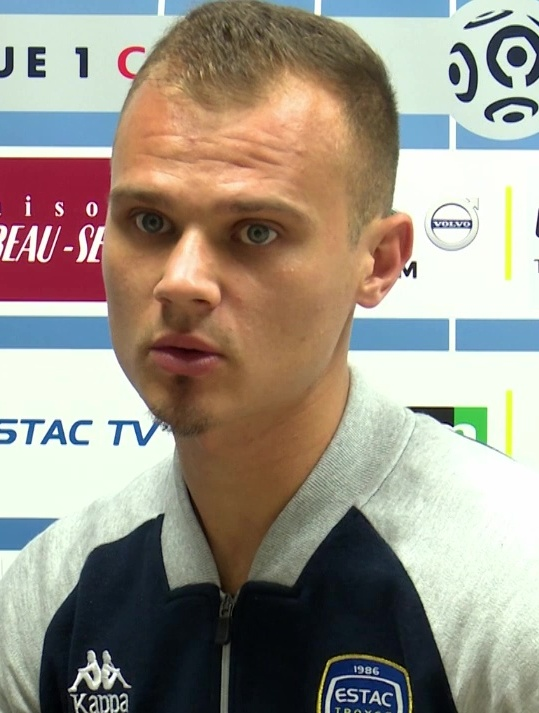

Personal information
- Date of birth: 22 September 1991 (age 35)
- Place of birth: Grande-Synthe, France
- Height: 1.86 m (6 ft 1 in)
- Position: Goalkeeper

Team information
- Current team: Beauvais

Youth career
- Nantes

Senior career*
Years	Team	Apps	(Gls)
2011–2015	Nantes	7	(0)
2012–2015	Nantes B	20	(0)
2015–2016	Rodez	26	(0)
2016–2018	Troyes B	5	(0)
2016–2018	Troyes	18	(0)
2018–2020	Caen	1	(0)
2019–2020	Caen B	1	(0)
2021–2022	Beauvais	13	(0)
Total		91	(0)
- * Club domestic league appearances and goals

Erwin Zelazny (born 22 September 1991) is a French professional footballer who plays as a goalkeeper.

== Career ==
On 21 May 2021, he joined fourth-tier club Beauvais.

== Personal life ==
Born in the north of France, Zelazny holds both French and Polish nationalities.

== Career statistics ==
Appearances and goals by club, season and competition
Club	Season	League			National Cup		League Cup		Other		Total	
Club	Season	Division	Apps	Goals	Apps	Goals	Apps	Goals	Apps	Goals	Apps	Goals
Nantes	2008–09	Ligue 1	0	0	0	0	0	0	—		0	0
Nantes	2009–10	Ligue 2	0	0	0	0	0	0	—		0	0
Nantes	2010–11	Ligue 2	2	0	0	0	0	0	—		2	0
Nantes	2011–12	Ligue 2	5	0	0	0	2	0	—		7	0
Nantes	2012–13	Ligue 2	0	0	3	0	0	0	—		3	0
Nantes	2013–14	Ligue 1	0	0	1	0	0	0	—		1	0
Nantes	2014–15	Ligue 1	0	0	0	0	0	0	—		0	0
Nantes	Total		7	0	4	0	2	0	—		13	0
Nantes B	2012–13	CFA 2	7	0	—		—		—		7	0
Nantes B	2013–14	CFA	9	0	—		—		—		9	0
Nantes B	2014–15	CFA	4	0	—		—		—		4	0
Nantes B	Total		20	0	—		—		—		20	0
Rodez	2015–16	CFA	26	0	2	0	—		—		28	0
Troyes B	2016–17	CFA 2	4	0	—		—		—		4	0
Troyes B	2017–18	Championnat National 3	1	0	—		—		—		1	0
Troyes B	Total		5	0	—		—		—		5	0
Troyes	2016–17	Ligue 2	1	0	3	0	0	0	0	0	4	0
Troyes	2017–18	Ligue 1	17	0	2	0	1	0	—		20	0
Troyes	Total		18	0	5	0	1	0	0	0	24	0
Caen	2018–19	Ligue 1	0	0	4	0	1	0	—		5	0
Caen	2019–20	Ligue 2	1	0	3	0	0	0	—		4	0
Caen	Total		1	0	7	0	1	0	—		9	0
Caen B	2018–19	Championnat National 3	1	0	—		—		—		1	0
Beauvais	2021–22	Championnat National 2	13	0	2	0	—		—		15	0
Career total			91	0	18	0	4	0	0	0	113	0
