= Johann Lepenant =

French footballer (born 2002)

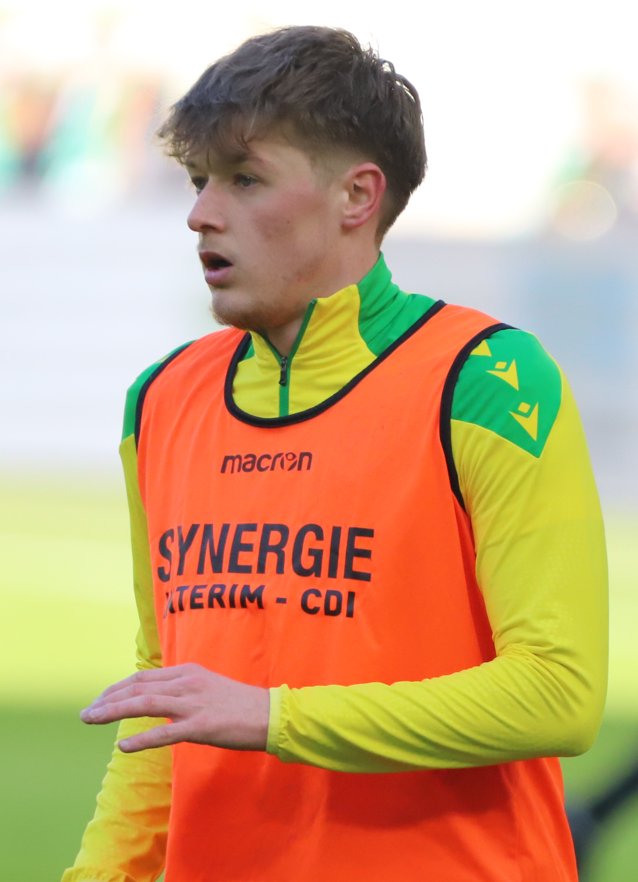
- Lepenant playing for FC Nantes in 2025

Personal information
- Full name: Johann Théo Tom Lepenant
- Date of birth: 22 October 2002 (age 24)
- Place of birth: Granville, France
- Height: 1.76 m (5 ft 9 in)
- Position: Defensive midfielder

Team information
- Current team: Nantes
- Number: 8

Youth career
- 2009–2017: Granville
- 2017–2020: Caen

Senior career*
Years	Team	Apps	(Gls)
2019–2020	Caen II	8	(0)
2020–2022	Caen	54	(0)
2022–2025	Lyon	37	(1)
2024–2025	→ Nantes (loan)	29	(2)
2025–	Nantes	26	(0)

International career^{‡}
2018	France U16	3	(0)
2018–2019	France U17	18	(0)
2019–2020	France U18	4	(0)
2021–2022	France U20	9	(0)
2023–2025	France U21	16	(2)
2024	France Olympic	1	(0)
Medal record
Men's football
Representing (France) France
Olympic Games
Silver medal – second place	2024 Paris	Team
FIFA U-17 World Cup
Third place	2019
- * Club domestic league appearances and goals as of 17:02, 2 May 2026 (UTC) ‡ National team caps and goals as of 25 June 2025

Johann Théo Tom Lepenant (born 22 October 2002) is a French professional footballer who plays as a defensive midfielder for Ligue 2 club Nantes.

== Club career ==
Lepenant was born in Granville, Manche, and made his professional debut for Caen on 12 September 2020.

On 22 June 2022, Lepenant signed for Lyon on a five-year deal.

On 10 August 2024, Lepenant signed for Nantes on a season-long loan with an option to make the move permanent for a fee in the region of €2.5 million. His permanent transfer to Nantes was made official on 3 July 2025.

== International career ==
Lepenant has also distinguished himself with the French youth national teams, notably at the 2019 FIFA U-17 World Cup, where France finished in third place. In 2022, he won the Maurice Revello Tournament with the France U20 team. He later participated in the Paris 2024 Olympic Games with the French Olympic team, winning a silver medal.

== Player profile ==
Standing at 1.76 metres tall, he is a right-footed player known for his hard work and contribution in midfield. He is considered a promising talent in French football.

== Career statistics ==
As of 2 May 2026

Appearances and goals by club, season and competition
Club	Season	League			National Cup		Other		Total	
Club	Season	Division	Apps	Goals	Apps	Goals	Apps	Goals	Apps	Goals
Caen II	2019–20	National 3	1	0	—		—		1	0
Caen II	2020–21	National 2	7	0	—		—		7	0
Caen II	Total		8	0	—		—		8	0
Caen	2020–21	Ligue 2	19	0	2	0	—		21	0
Caen	2021–22	Ligue 2	35	0	0	0	—		35	0
Caen	Total		54	0	2	0	—		56	0
Lyon	2022–23	Ligue 1	31	1	3	0	—		34	1
Lyon	2023–24	Ligue 1	6	0	0	0	—		6	0
Lyon	Total		37	1	3	0	—		40	1
Lyon B	2023–24	National 3	3	0	—		—		3	0
Nantes (loan)	2024–25	Ligue 1	29	2	2	0	—		31	2
Nantes	2025–26	Ligue 1	26	0	2	0	—		28	0
Career total			157	3	9	0	0	0	166	3

== Honours ==
France Olympic

- Summer Olympics silver medal: 2024

Orders

- Knight of the National Order of Merit: 2024
