= Yoël Armougom =

French footballer (born 1998)

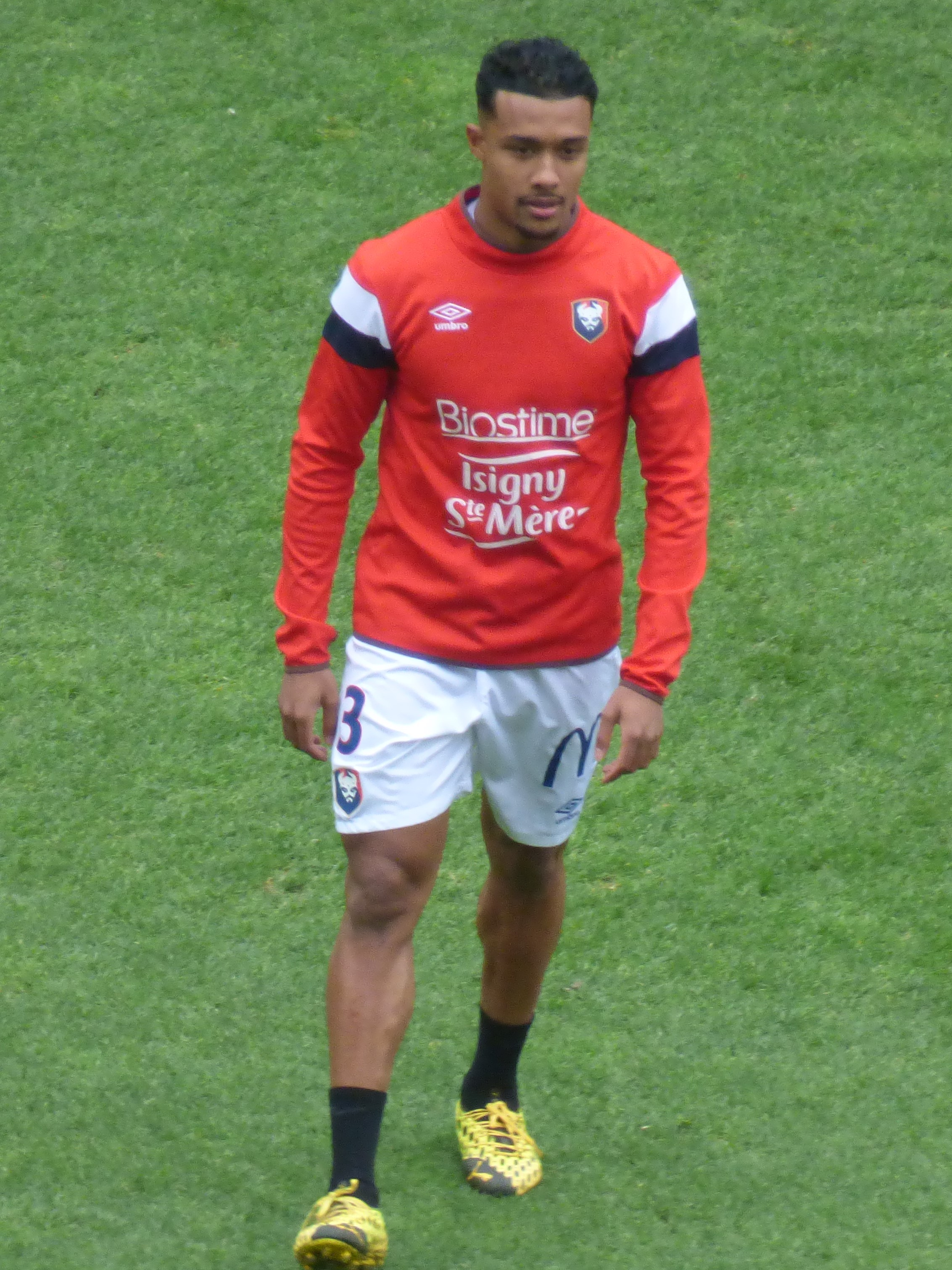
- Armougom with Caen in 2020

Personal information
- Date of birth: 5 June 1998 (age 28)
- Place of birth: Saint-Denis, Réunion, France
- Height: 1.75 m (5 ft 9 in)
- Position: Left-back

Team information
- Current team: Panserraikos
- Number: 31

Youth career
- 2015–2016: Saint-Denis FC
- 2016–2017: Caen

Senior career*
Years	Team	Apps	(Gls)
2017–2022	Caen B	23	(0)
2017–2022	Caen	99	(0)
2022–2023	Sochaux	20	(0)
2023–2025	Clermont	28	(0)
2023–2024	Clermont B	3	(0)
2025–	Panserraikos	7	(0)
- * Club domestic league appearances and goals as of 20 September 2026

Yoël Armougom (born 5 June 1998) is a French professional footballer who plays as a left-back for Super League Greece 2 club Panserraikos.

== Career ==
Armougom joined Caen in 2016, arriving from Saint-Denis FC. Armogoum made his professional debut for Caen in a 1–0 Coupe de la Ligue over Lorient on 24 October 2017. He made his Ligue 1 debut in a 1–0 win over Troyes on 28 October 2017.

On 16 June 2022, Armougom signed a three-year contract with Sochaux.

== Personal life ==
Armougom's father, Yoland, was a triple jumper of Malagasy descent.

== Career statistics ==
As of match played 11 May 2024

Appearances and goals by club, season, and competition
Club	Season	League			National cup		League cup		Total	
Club	Season	Division	Apps	Goals	Apps	Goals	Apps	Goals	Apps	Goals
Caen B	2016–17	CFA 2	8	0	—		—		8	0
Caen B	2017–18	National 3	11	0	—		—		11	0
Caen B	2019–20	National 3	2	0	—		—		2	0
Caen B	2020–21	National 2	2	0	—		—		2	0
Caen B	Total		23	0	—		—		23	0
Caen	2017–18	Ligue 1	4	0	1	1	1	0	6	1
Caen	2018–19	Ligue 1	29	0	1	0	1	0	31	0
Caen	2019–20	Ligue 2	22	0	3	1	1	0	26	1
Caen	2020–21	Ligue 2	24	0	1	0	—		25	0
Caen	2021–22	Ligue 2	20	0	1	0	—		21	0
Caen	Total		99	0	7	2	3	0	109	1
Sochaux	2022–23	Ligue 2	20	0	2	0	—		22	0
Clermont B	2023–24	National 3	3	0	—		—		3	0
Clermont	2023–24	Ligue 1	5	0	1	0	—		6	0
Career total			150	0	10	2	3	0	163	2
