= Alexander Djiku =

Footballer (born 1994)

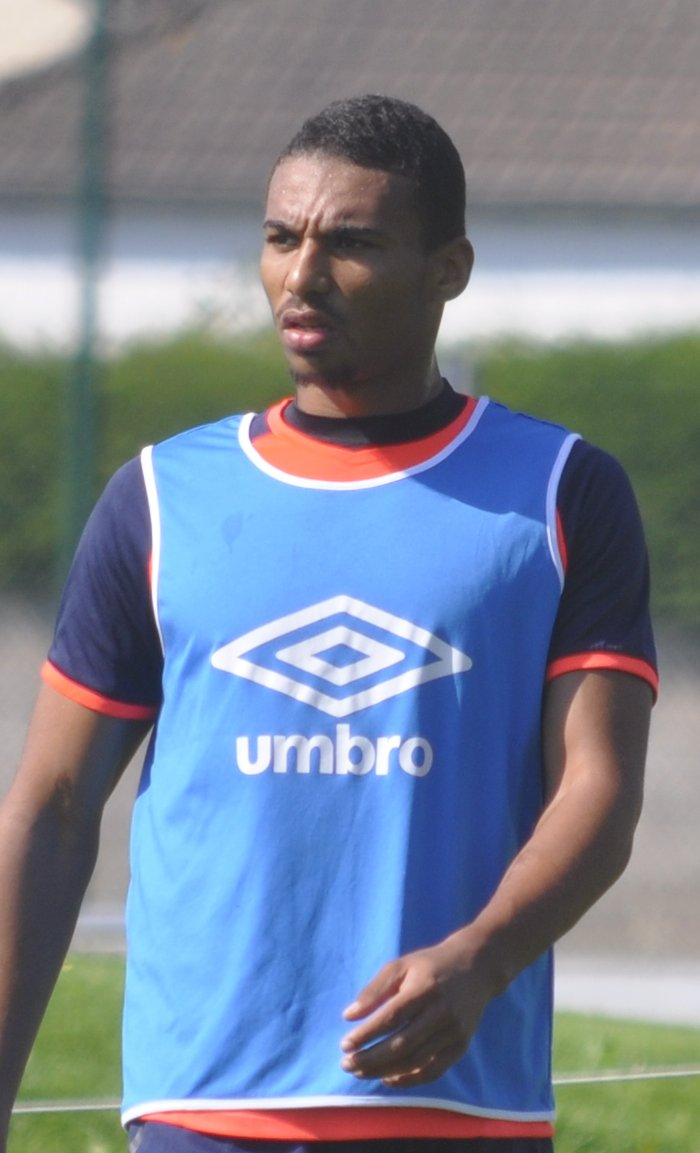
- Djiku training with Caen in 2017

Personal information
- Full name: Alexander Kwabena Baidooh Djiku
- Date of birth: 9 August 1994 (age 32)
- Place of birth: Montpellier, France
- Height: 1.82 m (6 ft 0 in)
- Position: Centre-back

Team information
- Current team: Spartak Moscow
- Number: 4

Youth career
- Bastia

Senior career*
Years	Team	Apps	(Gls)
2012–2016	Bastia B	46	(0)
2014–2017	Bastia	45	(1)
2017–2019	Caen	59	(1)
2019–2023	Strasbourg	117	(3)
2023–2025	Fenerbahçe	51	(3)
2025–	Spartak Moscow	26	(0)

International career^{‡}
2020–	Ghana	39	(4)
- * Club domestic league appearances and goals as of 16 September 2026 ‡ National team caps and goals as of 24 September 2026

Alexander Kwabena Baidooh Djiku (born 9 August 1994) is a professional footballer who plays as a centre-back for Russian Premier League club Spartak Moscow. Born in France, he plays for the Ghana national team.

== Club career ==
=== Bastia ===
Djiku spent his youth career at Bastia. He played for the reserve team until 2014. He made his debut in a Coupe de la Ligue match against Évian on 18 December 2013. On 3 December 2014, he made his Ligue 1 debut with the team against Évian.

=== Caen ===
On 11 July 2017, Djiku joined Ligue 1 side Caen on a four-year contract, Caen paid 2M€ for buy-out. On 5 August 2017, he made his debut with the team against Montpellier in Ligue 1.

=== Strasbourg ===
In July 2019, he was acquired by fellow Ligue 1 club Strasbourg for 4,5M€, signing a four-year contract. He made his continental debut in a 3–1 UEFA Europa League win over Maccabi Haifa on 25 July 2017.

=== Fenerbahçe ===
On 10 July 2023, Djiku signed a three-year contract with Süper Lig side Fenerbahçe for a free transfer. On 26 July 2023, he made his debut in the Conference League match in a 5–0 win against Zimbru at the Şükrü Saracoğlu Stadium.

On 13 August 2023, he made his Süper Lig debut against Gaziantep FK with a 2–1 home win. He scored his first goal for Fenerbahçe on 28 September 2023 against Başakşehir, netting the first goal in a 4–0 victory.

In his first year, he became one of the key players who took more responsibility on the field.

=== Spartak Moscow ===
On 8 September 2025, Djiku signed a two-year contract with Spartak Moscow in Russia.

== International career ==
Djiku is of Ghanaian and French descent. He debuted with the senior Ghana national team in a 3–0 friendly loss to Mali on 9 October 2020. He played his second match for Ghana against Qatar on 12 October 2020 in which he impressed. Djiku's third match came when he was given the opportunity by the Black Stars new head coach to start against Zimbabwe in a World Cup qualifier where Ghana won 3–1.

He was part of Ghana's team at the 2021 African Cup of Nations in Cameroon and scored his first goal against Comoros on 18 January 2022.

In 2022, Djiku competed at the 2022 FIFA World Cup in Qatar. At the tournament he played in matches against Portugal and South Korea. On 31 December 2023, he was selected from the list of 27 Ghanaian players selected by Chris Hughton to compete in the 2023 Africa Cup of Nations.

On 25 May 2026, Djiku was named in the Ghana's 28-man preliminary squad for the 2026 FIFA World Cup. He later withdrew from the squad due to injury and was replaced by Derrick Luckassen on 1 June.

== Personal life ==
Djiku is married to Heley Djiku. The couple have two children, Wesley and Elyana.

== Career statistics ==
=== Club ===
As of match played 28 October 2026

Appearances and goals by club, season and competition
Club	Season	League			National cup (Note: Includes Coupe de France, Turkish Cup, Russian Cup)		League cup (Note: Includes Coupe de la Ligue)		Continental		Other		Total	
Club	Season	Division	Apps	Goals	Apps	Goals	Apps	Goals	Apps	Goals	Apps	Goals	Apps	Goals
Bastia B	2012–13	CFA 2	14	0	—		—		—		—		14	0
Bastia B	2013–14	CFA 2	14	0	—		—		—		—		14	0
Bastia B	2014–15	CFA 2	16	0	—		—		—		—		16	0
Bastia B	2015–16	CFA 2	1	0	—		—		—		—		1	0
Bastia B	2016–17	CFA 2	1	0	—		—		—		—		1	0
Bastia B	Total		46	0	—		—		—		—		46	0
Bastia	2013–14	Ligue 1	0	0	0	0	1	0	—		—		1	0
Bastia	2014–15	Ligue 1	2	0	1	0	2	0	—		—		5	0
Bastia	2015–16	Ligue 1	20	0	1	0	0	0	—		—		21	0
Bastia	2016–17	Ligue 1	23	1	1	0	0	0	—		—		24	1
Bastia	Total		45	1	3	0	3	0	—		—		51	1
Caen	2017–18	Ligue 1	28	0	4	0	1	0	—		—		33	0
Caen	2018–19	Ligue 1	31	1	3	0	1	0	—		—		35	1
Caen	Total		59	1	7	0	2	0	—		—		68	1
Strasbourg	2019–20	Ligue 1	25	1	1	1	2	0	5 (Note: Appearances in UEFA Europa League)	0	—		33	2
Strasbourg	2020–21	Ligue 1	30	0	0	0	—		—		—		30	0
Strasbourg	2021–22	Ligue 1	31	1	2	0	—		—		—		33	1
Strasbourg	2022–23	Ligue 1	31	1	0	0	—		—		—		31	1
Strasbourg	Total		117	3	3	1	2	0	5	0	—		127	4
Fenerbahçe	2023–24	Süper Lig	25	3	0	0	—		11 (Note: Appearances in UEFA Europa Conference League)	0	—		36	3
Fenerbahçe	2024–25	Süper Lig	25	0	1	0	—		12 (Note: Four appearances in UEFA Champions League, eight appearances and one goal in UEFA Europa League)	1	—		38	1
Fenerbahçe	2025–26	Süper Lig	1	0	0	0	—		0	0	—		1	0
Fenerbahçe	Total		51	3	1	0	—		23	1	—		75	2
Spartak Moscow	2025–26	Russian Premier League	20	0	9	0	—		—		—		29	0
Spartak Moscow	2026–27	Russian Premier League	6	0	4	0	—		—		1 (Note: Appearance in Russian Super Cup)	0	11	0
Spartak Moscow	Total		26	0	13	0	—		—		1	0	40	0
Career total			344	8	27	1	7	0	28	1	1	0	407	10

=== International ===
As of match played 24 September 2026

Appearances and goals by national team and year
National team	Year	Apps	Goals
Ghana	2020	4	0
Ghana	2021	7	0
Ghana	2022	9	1
Ghana	2023	3	0
Ghana	2024	8	1
Ghana	2025	5	2
Ghana	2026	3	0
Total		39	4

Scores and results list Ghana's goal tally first.

List of international goals scored by Alexander Djiku
No.	Date	Venue	Opponent	Score	Result	Competition
1.	18 January 2022	Roumdé Adjia Stadium, Garoua, Cameroon	Comoros	2–2	2–3	2021 Africa Cup of Nations
2.	14 January 2024	Felix Houphouet Boigny Stadium, Abidjan, Ivory Coast	Cape Verde	1–1	1–2	2023 Africa Cup of Nations
3.	8 September 2025	Accra Sports Stadium, Accra, Ghana	Mali	1–0	1–0	2026 FIFA World Cup qualification
4.	8 October 2025	Ben M'Hamed El Abdi Stadium, El Jadida, Morocco	Central African Republic	3–0	5–0	2026 FIFA World Cup qualification

== Honours ==
Spartak Moscow

- Russian Cup: 2025–26

Individual

- Ghana Football Awards Footballer of the Year: 2022
