= Franklin Wadja =

Cameroonian footballer

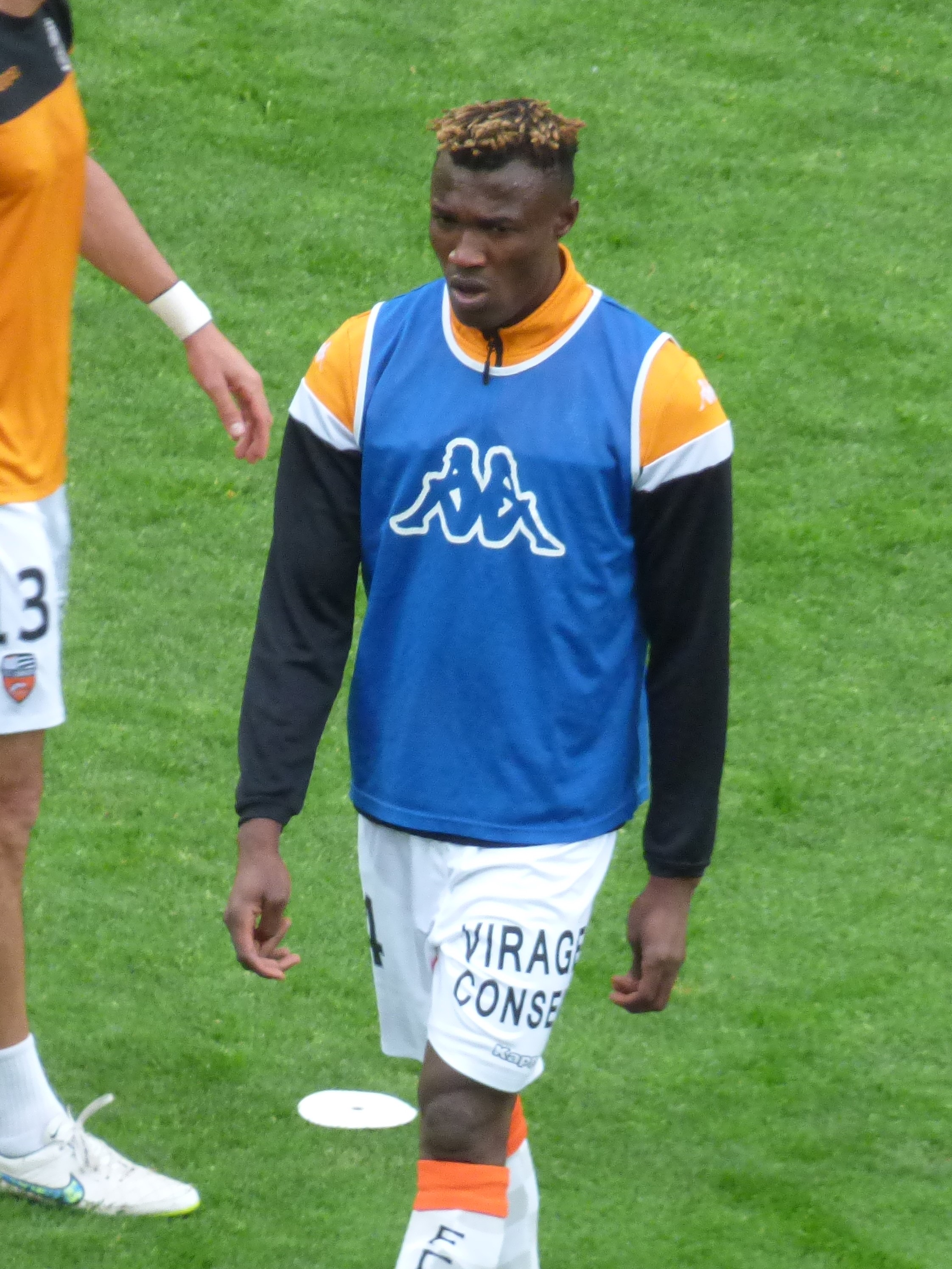
- Wadja with Lorient in 2019

Personal information
- Date of birth: 1 May 1995 (age 31)
- Place of birth: Douala, Cameroon
- Height: 1.85 m (6 ft 1 in)
- Position: Midfielder

Youth career
- 2013–2015: Niort

Senior career*
Years	Team	Apps	(Gls)
2015–2017	Vendée Fontenay	25	(2)
2017–2020	Lorient B	5	(1)
2017–2021	Lorient	75	(1)
2021–2023	Caen B	2	(0)
2021–2023	Caen	22	(1)
- * Club domestic league appearances and goals as of 24 January 2023

Franklin Wadja (born 1 May 1995) is a Cameroonian professional footballer who plays as a midfielder.

== Career ==
Wadja made his professional debut for Lorient in a 1–1 Ligue 2 tie with Quevilly-Rouen on 29 July 2017.

On 9 July 2021, he signed a two-year contract with Caen.
