= Herman Moussaki =

Congolese footballer (born 1999)

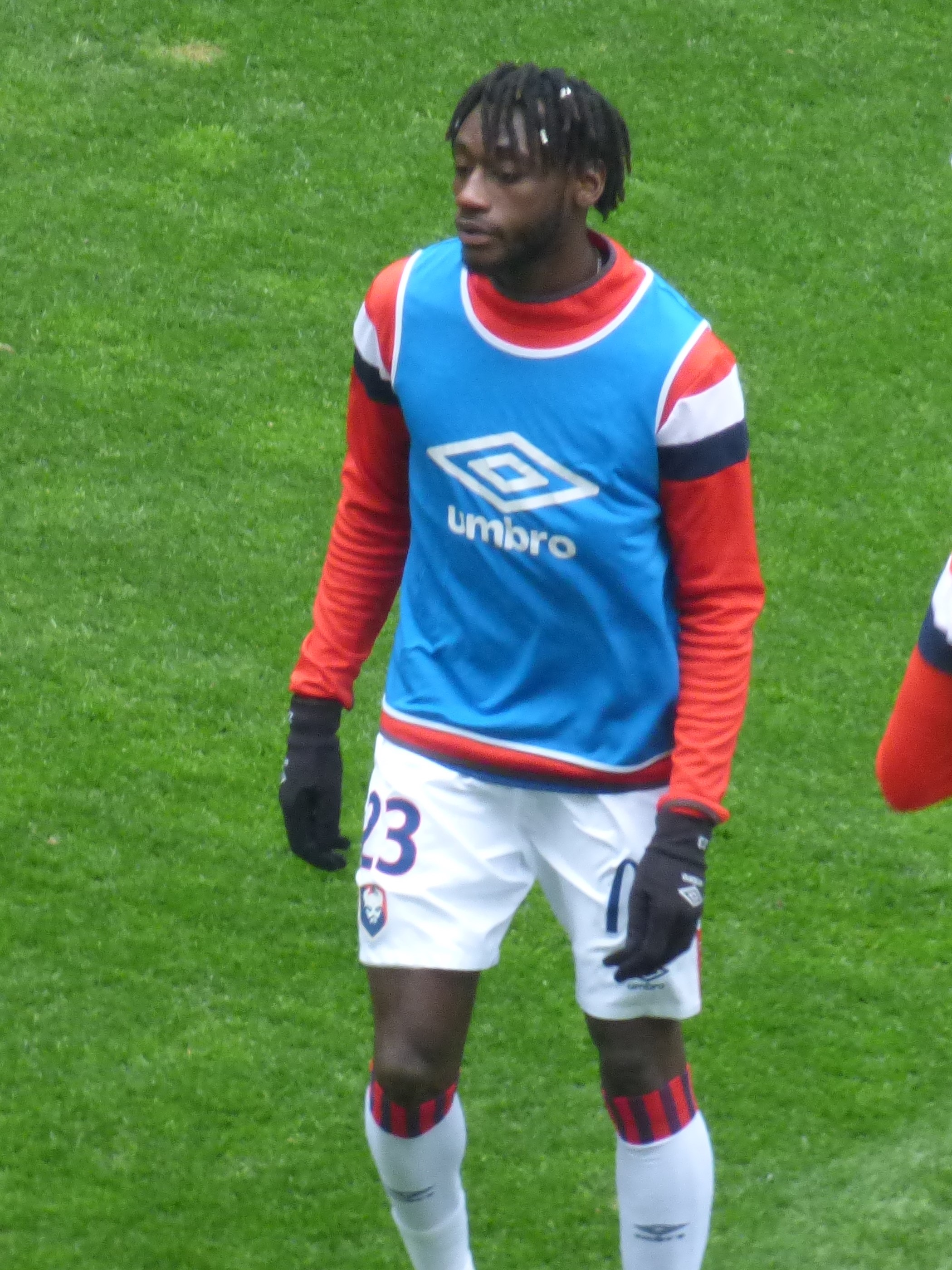
- Moussaki in 2020

Personal information
- Date of birth: 10 February 1999 (age 27)
- Place of birth: Brazzaville, Congo
- Height: 1.87 m (6 ft 2 in)
- Position: Forward

Youth career
- Brétigny
- 2016–2017: Caen

Senior career*
Years	Team	Apps	(Gls)
2017–2020	Caen B	40	(15)
2019–2021	Caen	20	(0)
2020–2021	→ Boulogne (loan)	24	(4)
2021–2022	Boulogne	20	(2)
2022–2024	Dudelange	39	(11)
2024–2025	Petrolul Ploiești	10	(0)
- * Club domestic league appearances and goals as of 14 December 2024

Herman Moussaki (born 10 February 1999) is a Congolese professional footballer who plays as a forward.

== Club career ==
Moussaki joined the youth academy of Stade Malherbe Caen in 2016 from CS Bretigny. He made his senior debut for Caen in a 1–0 Ligue 1 loss to Angers SCO on 13 April 2019. On 7 May 2019 he signed his first professional contract with the club.

On 5 October 2020, Moussaki was loaned to US Boulogne in the Championnat National for the 2019–20 season. During the loan he scored his first senior goal, in a 2–2 draw with Créteil on 24 October 2020.

== International career ==
Moussaki was called up to the Republic of the Congo U23s for March 2019.
