= Ismaël Diomandé (footballer, born 1992) =

Ivorian footballer (born 1992)

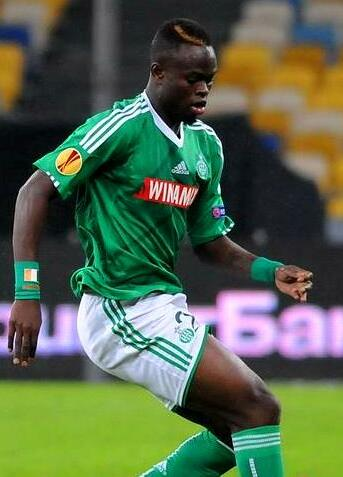
- Diomandé with Saint-Étienne in 2014

Personal information
- Full name: Tiémoko Ismaël Diomandé
- Date of birth: 28 August 1992 (age 34)
- Place of birth: Abidjan, Ivory Coast
- Height: 1.80 m (5 ft 11 in)
- Position: Midfielder

Youth career
- 2005–2008: ASEC Mimosas
- 2008–2009: Aubervilliers
- 2009–2010: Paris FC
- 2010–2011: Saint-Étienne

Senior career*
Years	Team	Apps	(Gls)
2010–2015	Saint-Étienne B	37	(0)
2011–2016	Saint-Étienne	47	(1)
2016	→ Caen (loan)	6	(0)
2016–2019	Caen	41	(0)
2019–2021	Çaykur Rizespor	24	(0)
2021	Konyaspor	15	(1)
2021–2023	Samsunspor	6	(1)
2023–2024	Petrolul Ploiești	30	(1)

International career^{‡}
2014–2019	Ivory Coast	19	(1)
Medal record
Representing Ivory Coast
Men's football
Africa Cup of Nations
Winner	2015 Guinea
- * Club domestic league appearances and goals as of 25 April 2024 ‡ National team caps and goals as of 18 July 2019

Tiémoko Ismaël Diomandé (born 28 August 1992) is a former Ivorian professional footballer who played as a midfielder.

== Club career ==
Diomandé was born in Abidjan, Ivory Coast, and first played youth football for ASEC Mimosas. He moved to the suburbs of Paris in 2008 and spent a few years in the Aubervilliers and Paris FC academies.

In 2010, Diomandé joined the youth setup of Saint-Étienne. In 2011, he was in the starting lineup of the Under-19 Gambardella Cup final against Monaco, and broke into the first team the same year. He signed a professional contract with Les Verts in 2012.

Diomandé was loaned out to fellow Ligue 1 team Caen in January 2016. In June that year, he joined them on a permanent transfer after signing a three-year deal.

Starting from 2019, Diomandé competed abroad in Turkey, with successive stints at Çaykur Rizespor, Konyaspor and Samsunspor. On 23 March 2023, he agreed to a deal for an undisclosed period with Romanian club Petrolul Ploiești.

== Career statistics ==
=== International ===
As of match played 18 July 2019

Appearances and goals by national team and year
National team	Year	Apps	Goals
Ivory Coast	2014	5	0
Ivory Coast	2015	7	0
Ivory Coast	2016	4	1
Ivory Coast	2017	1	0
Ivory Coast	2018	1	0
Ivory Coast	2019	1	0
Total		19	1

== Honours ==
Saint-Étienne

- Coupe de la Ligue: 2012–13

Ivory Coast

- Africa Cup of Nations: 2015
