= Jessy Pi =

French professional footballer (born 1993)

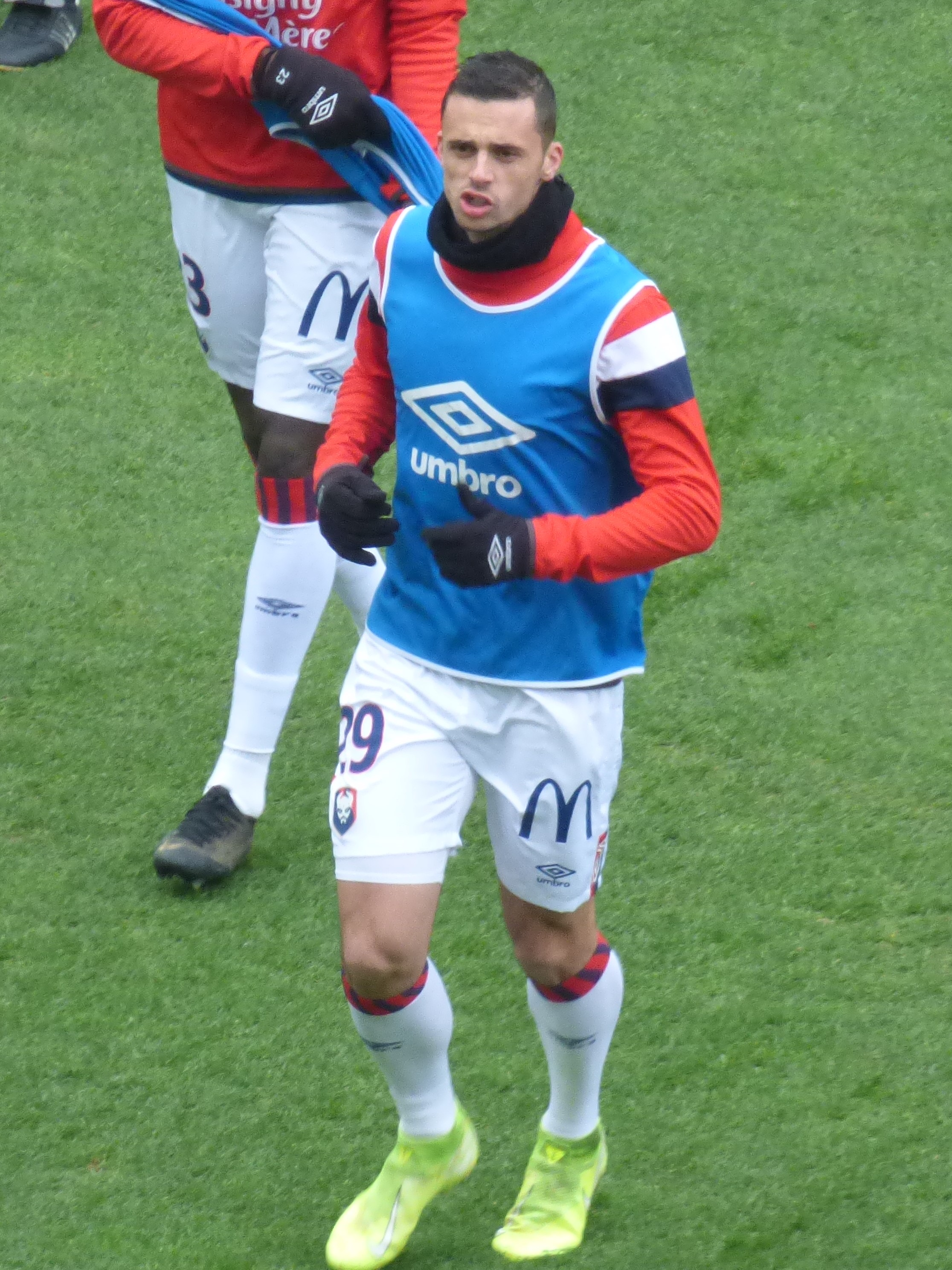
- Pi with Caen in 2020

Personal information
- Date of birth: 24 September 1993 (age 33)
- Place of birth: Manosque, France
- Height: 1.79 m (5 ft 10 in)
- Position: Defensive midfielder

Team information
- Current team: Avranches
- Number: 25

Youth career
- Monaco

Senior career*
Years	Team	Apps	(Gls)
2011–2014	Monaco B	55	(4)
2013–2016	Monaco	5	(0)
2014–2016	→ Troyes (loan)	75	(4)
2016–2019	Toulouse	16	(0)
2017–2018	→ Brest (loan)	33	(5)
2018–2019	→ Brest (loan)	21	(2)
2019–2021	Caen	49	(5)
2021–2023	Dijon	57	(0)
2024–	Avranches	43	(0)
- * Club domestic league appearances and goals as of 4 December 2025

Jessy Pi (born 24 September 1993) is a French professional footballer who plays as a defensive midfielder for Championnat National 2 club Avranches.

== Career ==
Pi made his Ligue 1 debut on 1 September 2013 in Monaco's 2–1 away win against Olympique Marseille. He replaced an injured Jérémy Toulalan after only nine minutes. He had a contract till June 2017.

On 27 June 2014, Pi was loaned to the Ligue 2 side Troyes for the 2014–15 season. He was loaned to Troyes AC for a second season on 20 July 2015.

On 21 June 2016, Pi agreed to a four-year contract with Toulouse.

On 29 June 2019, Pi signed a two-year contract with Caen.

On 12 July 2021, he moved to Dijon on a two-year deal.
