= Romain Genevois =

Haitian footballer (born 1987)

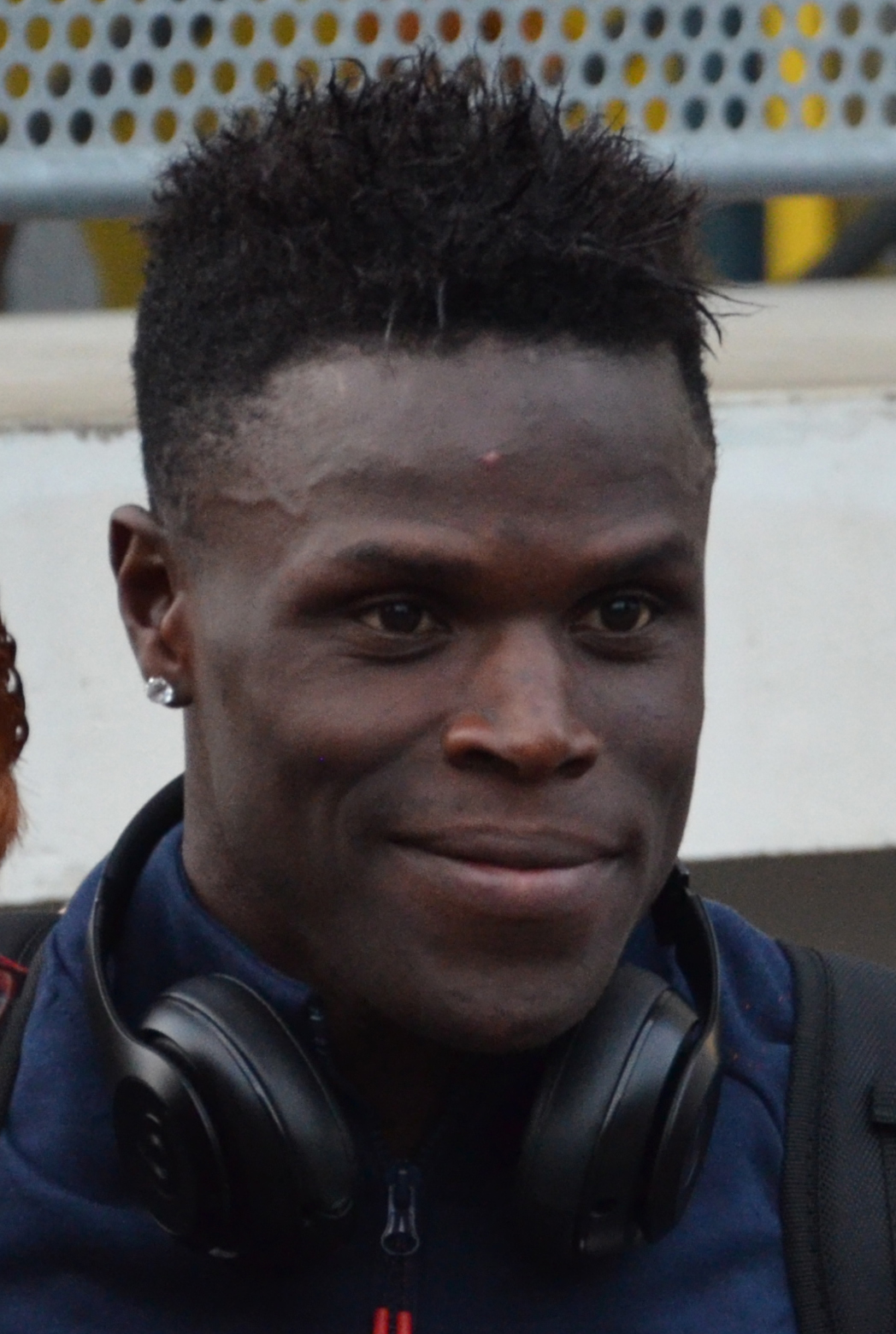
- Genevois in 2016

Personal information
- Date of birth: 28 October 1987 (age 39)
- Place of birth: L'Estère, Haiti
- Height: 1.80 m (5 ft 11 in)
- Position: Defender

Youth career
- 2000–2006: Gueugnon

Senior career*
Years	Team	Apps	(Gls)
2006–2009	Gueugnon	33	(1)
2009–2012	Tours	100	(10)
2012–2016	Nice	91	(1)
2012–2016	Nice B	1	(0)
2016–2019	Caen	43	(0)
Total		268	(12)

International career
2008–2017	Haiti	10	(0)
- * Club domestic league appearances and goals

Romain Genevois (born 28 October 1987) is a Haitian former professional footballer who played as a defender.

== Early years ==
Genevois was born in L'Estère, Haiti. At the age 3, he was separated from his biological parents who had difficulty raising him. He was then adopted, along with his younger brother, by a French couple who could not have children. He arrived in France on 5 February 1991 and grew up in Montcenis, a small town of Saône-et-Loire where his parents had chosen to live.

== Club career ==
Genevois came up through FC Gueugnon's youth ranks to make his first team debut in the 2006–07 season. He moved to Tours FC in 2009 returning to Ligue 2. He then signed with OGC Nice in 2012 and concluded his tenure with a fourth-place finish and qualification to the UEFA Europa League in 2016. Genevois signed a three-year contract to play for Stade Malherbe Caen.

In his career, Genevois has recorded over one hundred games in Ligue 1 and 286 in the pros and has made several trips to the European Cup.

== International career ==
He made his debut for Haiti in the February 2008 friendly series against Venezuela, which served as a warm-up for the 2010 FIFA World Cup qualification match against Nicaragua or the Netherlands Antilles.

In 2013, Genevois was interviewed by Nice-Matin, which he made clear that he was not a Haitian international as was often said and was 100% French. He cited that he had never signed any document to keep dual citizenship and did not accept Haitian nationality. He claims to have responded to a call for a friendly match in Venezuela, but said it did not officially count as he did not go through Haiti. After spending a week with the team, which he recalls a good memory, organization was an issue. He first recalls arriving in the morning at a Florida airport, only to be picked up in the evening and did not know who the national coach was. This bad experience led him to further pursuit his pro career in France. He was later contacted by team officials to rejoin, but did not want to go to Haiti citing its difficult conditions and thus not revisited the island since leaving for France in his early childhood.

In 2016, that changed when he finally accepted the solicitations of the Haitian selection under the new coach, Patrice Neveu. During this second stint with the national team, his outlook differed and stated his pleasure to be able to play for his country of origin and that things has really changed. He cites that something is building and there is room for optimism in Haitian football evoking its entry in the Copa America as "a very good experience, a very nice competition." He was one of the 23 players selected for the 2016 Copa América, which was the first time in its history to allow qualifications from countries outside of CONMEBOL, thus Haiti managed to qualify and enter for the first time.

== Personal life ==
Genevois is married and is a father of two, a daughter and a son. He, along with his parents, has sent donations to Haiti through the association that allowed his adoption.
