= Adama Mbengue =

Senegalese footballer (born 1993)

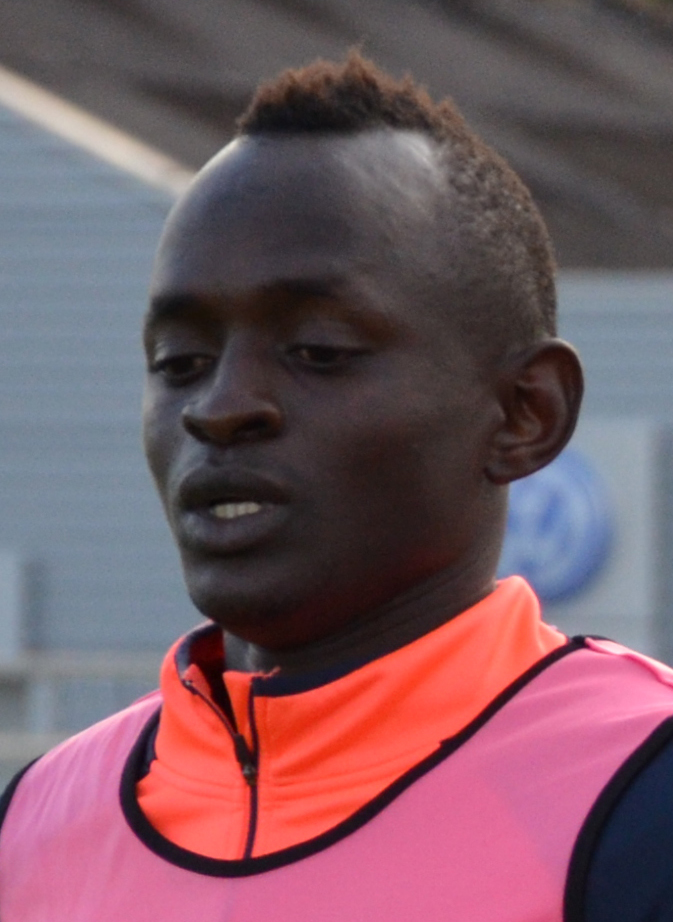
- Mbengue training with Caen in 2017

Personal information
- Full name: Adama Mbengue
- Date of birth: 1 December 1993 (age 32)
- Place of birth: Rufisque, Senegal
- Height: 1.80 m (5 ft 11 in)
- Position: Left-back

Team information
- Current team: LB Châteauroux
- Number: 13

Youth career
- 2009–2011: Sport Galaxy

Senior career*
Years	Team	Apps	(Gls)
2012	Orlando City U-23	10	(0)
2012–2014	Orlando City	53	(3)
2014–2017	Diambars	46	(1)
2017	Caen II	8	(0)
2017–2021	Caen	50	(1)
2021–2025	Châteauroux	100	(4)
2025–2026	FC Dieppe	19	(0)
2026–	LB Châteauroux	0	(0)

International career
2015	Senegal U23	5	(0)
2016–2018	Senegal	8	(0)
- * Club domestic league appearances and goals as of 26 May 2025

Adama Mbengue (born 1 December 1993) is a Senegalese professional footballer who plays as a left-back for LB Châteauroux.

== Club career ==
After being scouted in Senegal during his time with Orlando City Academy Affiliate, Sport Galaxy, Mbengue played with Orlando City in the 2012 Walt Disney World Pro Soccer Classic at the age of 19 and later joined USL PDL club Orlando City U-23, where he made 10 appearances in 2012.

On 21 June 2012, Mbengue was promoted to Orlando City's senior roster, making him the first player in club history to be promoted from the U23s to the pro side. He made his professional debut the following day in a 3–0 win over the Harrisburg City Islanders.

In the 2013 Lamar Hunt U.S. Open Cup, Mbengue made a major impact on Orlando City's run to the quarterfinals. He scored in a second-round win over the Ocala Stampede and set up Long Tan for the only goal of the game in a 1–0 upset of Major League Soccer club and defending tournament champion Sporting Kansas City on 12 June.

In June 2017, Mbengue joined Ligue 1 side Caen on a four-year contract.

On 19 July 2021, he signed a one-year contract with Châteauroux in the third tier.

== International career ==
On 16 March 2017, Adama Mbengue was called up for the first time to Senegal's national team by coach Aliou Cissé, for friendly matches against Nigeria and Ivory Coast. He celebrated his first selection by an incumbent against Nigeria on 23 March (1-1).

On 17 June 2018, Mbengue was called up to the Senegal squad for the 2018 FIFA World Cup to replace Saliou Ciss who injured himself in training.

== Career statistics ==
As of 28 July 2019

Senegal
Year	Apps	Goals
2015	2	0
2016	1	0
2017	3	0
2018	1	0
Total	7	0
