= Baïssama Sankoh =

Guinean footballer (born 1992)

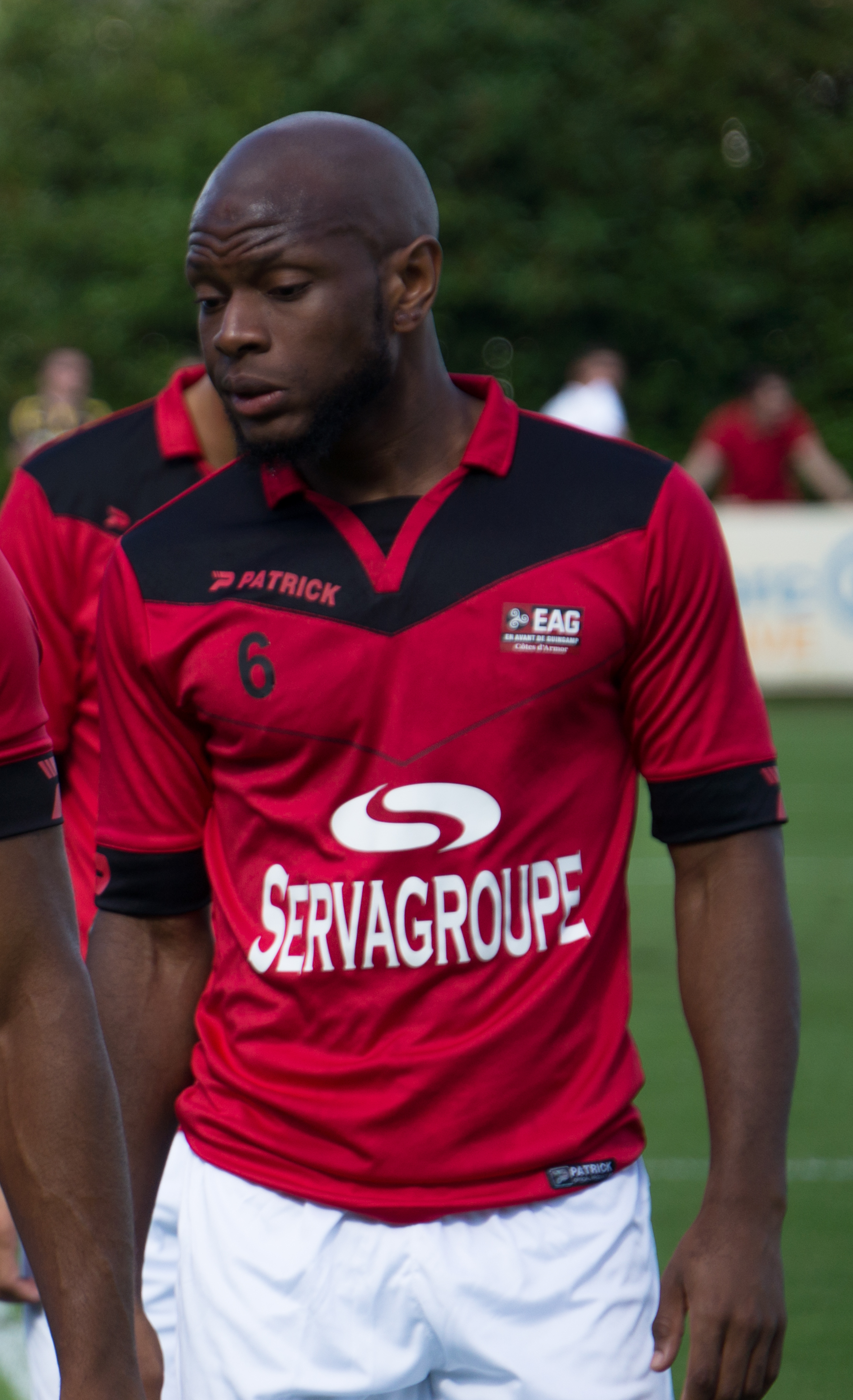
- Sankoh in 2016

Personal information
- Full name: Baïssama Mohamed Sankoh
- Date of birth: 20 March 1992 (age 34)
- Place of birth: Nogent-sur-Marne, France
- Height: 1.80 m (5 ft 11 in)
- Position: Right-back

Team information
- Current team: Le Pays du Valois

Youth career
- Guingamp

Senior career*
Years	Team	Apps	(Gls)
2012–2017	Guingamp	59	(0)
2015–2016	→ Brest (loan)	33	(0)
2017–2020	Caen	50	(4)
2020	Ascoli	0	(0)
2020–2021	Nea Salamina	22	(0)
2022–2023	Compiègne	24	(0)
2023–	Le Pays du Valois	32	(8)

International career^{‡}
2013–	Guinea	21	(0)
- * Club domestic league appearances and goals as of 23 November 2024 ‡ National team caps and goals as of 12 October 2016

Baïssama Mohamed Sankoh (born 20 March 1992) is a professional footballer who plays for French Championnat National 3 club Le Pays du Valois. Born in France, he represents Guinea internationally.

== Club career ==
Born in Nogent-sur-Marne, France, Sankoh made his Ligue 2 debut during the 2011–12 season for EA Guingamp.

He joined Brest on loan for the 2015–16 season. For Brest, he mostly played in midfield, instead of his accustomed full-back position.

On 3 July 2017, he joined French side SM Caen on a three-year contract. He remained in the club until 1 February 2020, day where he left the club remaining free agent.

On 23 February 2020, he joined the Italian side Ascoli. The contract is until the end of the 2019–20 season, with the club holding an option to renew it for two additional seasons.

== International career ==
Sankoh was called up by the coach Michel Dussuyer in the Guinean squad for a friendly against Congo DR on 1 June 2013, and for the 2014 World Cup preliminaries against Mozambique and Zimbabwe.

He played with the national team in 2015 Africa Cup of Nations, where the team reached the quarter-finals.

== Honours ==
Guingamp

- Coupe de France: 2013–14
