= Jessy Deminguet =

French footballer (born 1998)

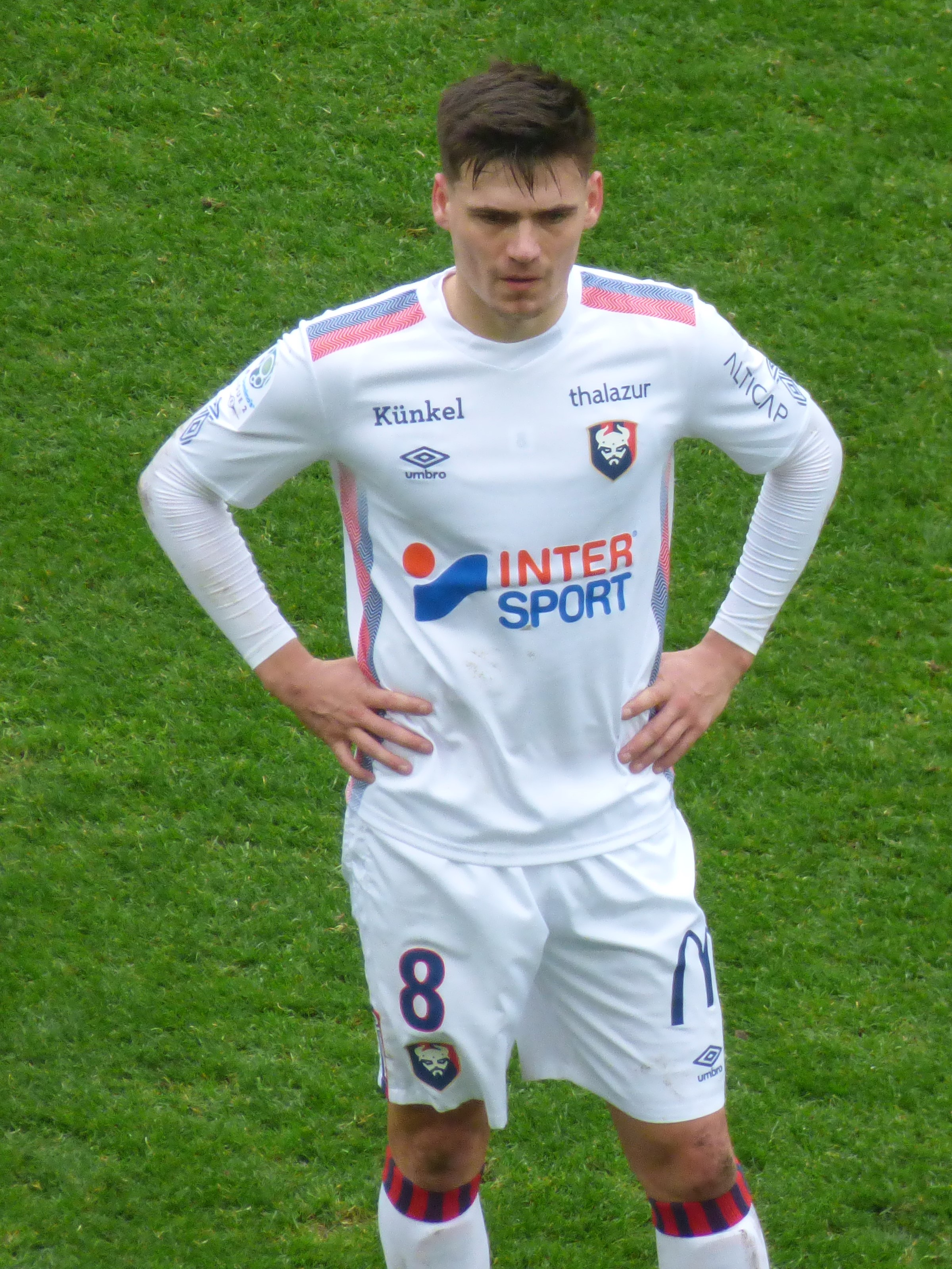
- Deminguet with Caen in 2020

Personal information
- Full name: Jessy Deminguet
- Date of birth: 7 January 1998 (age 28)
- Place of birth: Lisieux, France
- Height: 1.78 m (5 ft 10 in)
- Position: Midfielder

Team information
- Current team: Metz
- Number: 20

Youth career
- 2004–2005: US Lexovienne
- 2005–2008: CA Lisieux
- 2008–2017: Caen

Senior career*
Years	Team	Apps	(Gls)
2016–2023	Caen B	31	(2)
2017–2023	Caen	138	(16)
2023–2025	Strasbourg	18	(0)
2024–2025	→ Metz (loan)	30	(1)
2025–	Metz	31	(2)

International career
2018	France U20	3	(0)
- * Club domestic league appearances and goals as of 10 May 2026

Jessy Deminguet (born 7 January 1998) is a French professional footballer who plays as a midfielder for Ligue 2 club Metz.

== Club career ==
A member of the Caen youth academy starting in 2009, Deminguet started training with the first team in September 2017. He made his professional debut for Caen in a 5–0 Ligue 1 loss to Marseille on 5 November 2017.

On 10 February 2023, Deminguet signed a pre-contract agreement with Ligue 1 club Strasbourg, joining the club in the summer.

== International career ==
Deminguet received a call-up to represent the France national under-20 football team for the 2018 Toulon Tournament on 17 May 2018.

== Personal life ==
Deminguet was born in Lisieux, and is of Norman descent. Jessy is one of 11 siblings, and his father was a former footballer.

== Career statistics ==
As of match played 10 May 2026

Appearances and goals by club, season and competition
Club	Season	League			Coupe de France		Coupe de la Ligue		Europe		Total	
Club	Season	Division	Apps	Goals	Apps	Goals	Apps	Goals	Apps	Goals	Apps	Goals
Caen B	2015–16	National 3	1	0	—		—		—		1	0
Caen B	2016–17	National 3	15	1	—		—		—		15	1
Caen B	2017–18	National 3	11	1	—		—		—		11	1
Caen B	2018–19	National 3	1	0	—		—		—		1	0
Caen B	2022–23	Championnat National 2	3	0	—		—		—		3	0
Caen B	Total		31	2	—		—		—		31	2
Caen	2017–18	Ligue 1	12	1	3	0	1	0	—		16	1
Caen	2018–19	Ligue 1	20	0	3	0	1	0	—		24	0
Caen	2019–20	Ligue 2	25	5	4	0	1	0	—		30	5
Caen	2020–21	Ligue 2	34	4	1	1	—		—		35	5
Caen	2021–22	Ligue 2	33	6	1	0	—		—		34	6
Caen	2022–23	Ligue 2	14	0	2	1	—		—		16	1
Caen	Total		138	16	14	2	3	0	0	0	155	18
Strasbourg	2023–24	Ligue 1	18	0	2	0	—		—		20	0
Metz (loan)	2024–25	Ligue 2	30	1	2	1	—		3 (Note: Appearances in Ligue 1 relegation/promotion play-offs)	0	35	2
Metz	2025–26	Ligue 1	31	2	1	0	—		—		32	2
Career total			248	21	19	3	3	0	3	0	273	24
