= 2024–25 Torino FC season =

Torino
2024–25 season
- Owner: UT Communication
- President: Urbano Cairo
- Head coach: Paolo Vanoli
- Stadium: Stadio Olimpico Grande Torino
- Serie A: 11th
- Coppa Italia: Second round
- Top goalscorer: League: Ché Adams (9); All: Ché Adams (10)
- Highest home attendance: 27,014 vs Juventus, Serie A, 11 January 2025
- Lowest home attendance: 12,035 vs Cosenza, Coppa Italia, 11 August 2024
- Average home league attendance: 22,643
- Biggest win: 2–0 vs Cosenza (H), Coppa Italia, 11 August 2024; 2–0 vs Cagliari (H), Serie A 24 January 2025; 0–2 vs Monza (A)
- Biggest defeat: 2–0 vs Juventus (H), Serie A, 9 November 2024; 0–2 vs Bologna (A), Serie A, 21 December 2024
Home colours	Away colours	Third colours

The 2024–25 season was the 105th season in the history of Torino Football Club, and club's 13th consecutive season in the Serie A. In addition to the domestic league, the club participated in the Coppa Italia.

On 20 May 2024, it was announced that Paolo Vanoli would take charge of the club for the 2024–25 season, replacing the departing Ivan Jurić.

== Players ==
As of 7 February 2025

Note: Flags indicate national team as defined under FIFA eligibility rules; some limited exceptions apply. Players may hold more than one non-FIFA nationality.

No.	Pos.	Nation	Player
1	GK	ITA	Alberto Paleari
3	DF	NED	Perr Schuurs
4	DF	POL	Sebastian Walukiewicz
5	DF	MAR	Adam Masina
7	FW	FRA	Yann Karamoh
8	MF	SRB	Ivan Ilić
9	FW	PAR	Antonio Sanabria
10	MF	CRO	Nikola Vlašić
11	FW	MKD	Eljif Elmas (on loan from RB Leipzig)
13	DF	CHI	Guillermo Maripán
15	FW	FRA	Amine Salama (on loan from Reims)
16	MF	NOR	Marcus Pedersen (on loan from Feyenoord)
17	GK	ITA	Antonio Donnarumma
18	FW	SCO	Ché Adams
20	MF	AUT	Valentino Lazaro

No.	Pos.	Nation	Player
21	MF	FRA	Ali Dembélé
22	MF	ITA	Cesare Casadei
23	DF	GEQ	Saúl Coco
24	MF	CRO	Borna Sosa (on loan from Ajax)
26	MF	TUR	Emirhan İlkhan
28	MF	ITA	Samuele Ricci
32	GK	SRB	Vanja Milinković-Savić (vice-captain)
34	DF	ITA	Cristiano Biraghi (on loan from Fiorentina)
61	MF	FRA	Adrien Tameze
66	MF	LTU	Gvidas Gineitis
77	MF	POL	Karol Linetty
79	FW	CYP	Zanos Savva
91	FW	COL	Duván Zapata (captain)
92	FW	SWE	Alieu Njie

== Transfers ==
=== Summer window ===
==== In ====
Date	Pos.	Player	From	Fee	Notes	Ref.
30 June 2024	FW	(France) Yann Karamoh	(France) Montpellier	End of loan		
30 June 2024	MF	(Democratic Republic of the Congo) Brian Bayeye	(Italy) Ascoli	End of loan		
30 June 2024	MF	(France) Ali Dembélé	(Italy) Venezia	End of loan		
30 June 2024	MF	(Turkey) Emirhan İlkhan	(Turkey) İstanbul Başakşehir	End of loan		
1 July 2024	DF	(Morocco) Adam Masina	(Italy) Udinese	€1,000,000	Loan transfer made permanent	
1 July 2024	FW	(Colombia) Duván Zapata	(Italy) Atalanta	€8,600,000	Loan transfer made permanent	
17 July 2024	DF	(Equatorial Guinea) Saúl Coco	(Spain) Las Palmas	€7,500,000		
19 July 2024	GK	(Italy) Alberto Paleari	(Italy) Benevento	Free		
23 July 2024	FW	(Scotland) Ché Adams	(England) Southampton	Free		
14 August 2024	GK	(Italy) Antonio Donnarumma	(Italy) Padova	Free		
29 August 2024	DF	(Chile) Guillermo Maripán	(France) Monaco	€2,000,000		
30 August 2024	DF	(Poland) Sebastian Walukiewicz	(Italy) Empoli	€5,000,000		

==== Loans in ====
Date	Pos.	Player	From	Fee	Notes	Ref.
17 August 2024	MF	(Croatia) Borna Sosa	(Netherlands) Ajax	Free	Option to buy for €7,000,000	
22 August 2024	MF	(Norway) Marcus Holmgren Pedersen	(Netherlands) Feyenoord	€1,000,000	Obligation to buy for €3,500,000	

==== Out ====
Date	Pos.	Player	To	Fee	Notes	Ref.
30 June 2024	FW	(Serbia) Uroš Kabić	(Serbia) Red Star Belgrade	End of loan		
30 June 2024	DF	(Italy) Matteo Lovato	(Italy) Salernitana	End of loan		
30 June 2024	DF	(Nigeria) David Okereke	(Italy) Cremonese	End of loan		
1 July 2024	FW	(Moldova) Lado Akhalaia	Unattached	Free	End of contract	
1 July 2024	DF	(Ivory Coast) Koffi Djidji	Unattached	Free	End of contract	
1 July 2024	DF	(Switzerland) Ricardo Rodriguez	(Spain) Real Betis	Free	End of contract	
1 July 2024	MF	(Italy) Giorgio Savini	Unattached	Free	End of contract	
1 July 2024	MF	(Ivory Coast) Ben Lhassine Kone	(Italy) Como	€1,500,000	Loan transfer made permanent	
13 July 2024	DF	(Italy) Alessandro Buongiorno	(Italy) Napoli	€35,000,000		
3 August 2024	GK	(Italy) Luca Gemello	(Italy) Perugia	Free		
10 August 2024	GK	(Italy) Pietro Passador	(Italy) Pro Vercelli	Undisclosed		
22 August 2024	DF	(Italy) Raoul Bellanova	(Italy) Atalanta	€20,000,000		
29 August 2024	MF	(Hungary) Krisztofer Horváth	(Hungary) Újpest	€1,000,000		
3 September 2024	MF	(Serbia) Nemanja Radonjić	(Serbia) Red Star Belgrade	€200,000		

==== Loans out ====
Date	Pos.	Player	To	Fee	Notes	Ref.
8 July 2024	MF	(Italy) Tommaso Di Marco	(Italy) Juve Stabia	Free	Option to buy for an undisclosed fee, buy-back option for an undisclosed fee	
16 July 2024	DF	(Albania) Kevin Haveri	(Italy) Campobasso	Free		
20 July 2024	FW	(Italy) Nicola Rauti	(Italy) Vicenza	Free	Option to buy for an undisclosed fee, buy-back option for an undisclosed fee	
14 August 2024	GK	(Romania) Mihai Popa	(Romania) CFR Cluj	Free		
20 August 2024	FW	(Senegal) Demba Seck	(Italy) Catanzaro	Free	Option to buy for an undisclosed fee	
30 August 2024	DF	(Italy) Alessandro Dellavalle	(Italy) Modena	Free	Option to buy for an undisclosed fee, buy-back option for an undisclosed fee	
30 August 2024	FW	(Italy) Pietro Pellegri	(Italy) Empoli	Free	Option to buy for €4,500,000	
30 August 2024	DF	(Georgia (country)) Saba Sazonov	(Italy) Empoli	Free	Option to buy for €3,500,000	
7 September 2024	DF	(France) Ange Caumenan N'Guessan	(Slovenia) Bravo	Free		

=== Winter window ===
==== In ====
Date	Pos.	Player	From	Fee	Notes	Ref.
2 February 2025	MF	(Italy) Cesare Casadei	(England) Chelsea	€15,000,000		
2 February 2025	MF	(Italy) Tommaso Di Marco	(Italy) Juve Stabia	Loan terminated early		
2 February 2025	DF	(Albania) Kevin Haveri	(Italy) Campobasso	Loan terminated early		

==== Loans in ====
Date	Pos.	Player	From	Fee	Notes	Ref.
30 January 2025	MF	(North Macedonia) Eljif Elmas	(Germany) RB Leipzig	Free	Option to buy for €17,000,000	
3 February 2025	MF	(Italy) Cristiano Biraghi	(Italy) Fiorentina	€1,000,000	Obligation to buy for €3,500,000	
3 February 2025	FW	(France) Amine Salama	(France) Reims	€200,000	Option to buy for €4,000,000	
3 February 2025	MF	(Germany) Nuha Jatta	(Germany) RB Leipzig			

==== Out ====
Date	Pos.	Player	To	Fee	Notes	Ref.
3 February 2025	DF	(Kosovo) Mërgim Vojvoda	(Italy) Como	€3,500,000		

==== Loans out ====
Date	Pos.	Player	To	Fee	Notes	Ref.
10 January 2025	FW	(France) Côme Bianay Balcot	(Italy) Triestina	Free	Option to buy for an undisclosed fee, buy-back option for an undisclosed fee	
17 January 2025	FW	(Italy) Francesco Dell'Aquila	(Italy) Messina	Free		
21 January 2025	MF	(Italy) Jacopo Antolini	(Italy) Pro Vercelli	Free		
3 February 2025	MF	(Italy) Aaron Ciammaglichella	(Italy) Ternana	Free		
3 February 2025	MF	(Italy) Tommaso Di Marco	(Italy) Feralpisalò	Free	Option to buy for an undisclosed fee, buy-back option for an undisclosed fee	
3 February 2025	DF	(Albania) Kevin Haveri	(Italy) Messina	Free		
7 February 2025	DF	(Democratic Republic of the Congo) Brian Bayeye	(Serbia) Radnički Niš	Free		

== Friendlies ==
=== Pre-season ===
20 July 2024 Friendly	Torino (Italy)	2–1	(Italy) Virtus Verona
17:00 CEST (UTC+2)

27 July 2024 Friendly	Torino (Italy)	1–2	(Italy) Cremonese	Pinzolo
16:00 CEST (UTC+2)	Zapata 32'		Vázquez 12'; Antov 69'
Note: Match was played in four periods of thirty minutes each.

31 July 2024 Friendly	Lyon (France)	0–0	(Italy) Torino	Bourgoin-Jallieu, France
20:00 CEST (UTC+2)				Stadium: Stade Pierre Rajon

3 August 2024 Friendly	Metz (France)	0–3	(Italy) Torino	Longeville-lès-Metz, France
17:00 CEST (UTC+2)		Report	Zapata 36', (yellow card) 81'; Ricci (yellow card) 42', (goal) 87'; Lazaro 45+1'; Dellavalle (yellow card) 66'	Stadium: Stade Saint-Symphorien

== Competitions ==
=== Overall record ===
Competition	First match	Last match	Starting round	Final position	Record							
Competition	First match	Last match	Starting round	Final position	Pld	W	D	L	GF	GA	GD	Win %
Serie A	17 August 2024	24–25 May 2025	Matchday 1		33	10	13	10	38	37	+1	30.30
Coppa Italia	11 August 2024	24 September 2024	First round	Second round	2	1	0	1	3	2	+1	50.00
Total					35	11	13	11	41	39	+2	31.43

Last updated: 23 April 2025
Source: Soccerway

=== Serie A ===
==== League table ====
Pos	Team	Pld	W	D	L	GF	GA	GD	Pts	Qualification or relegation
9	Bologna	38	16	14	8	57	47	+10	62	Qualification for the Europa League league phase (Note: Bologna qualified for the Europa League league stage as the winners of the 2024–25 Coppa Italia.)
10	Como	38	13	10	15	49	52	−3	49	
11	Torino	38	10	14	14	39	45	−6	44 (Note: Torino finished ahead of Udinese on head-to-head points: Udinese 2–2 Torino, Torino 2–0 Udinese.)	
12	Udinese	38	12	8	18	41	56	−15	44	
13	Genoa	38	10	13	15	37	49	−12	43	

Source: Serie A
Rules for classification: 1) Points; 2) Tiebreaker for Champions team and third relegated team; 3) Head-to-head points; 4) Head-to-head goal difference; 5) Goal difference; 6) Goals scored; 7) Draw.
(Note: Head-to-head record is used only after all the matches between the teams in question have been played)

==== Results summary ====
Overall								Home						Away					
Pld	W	D	L	GF	GA	GD	Pts	W	D	L	GF	GA	GD	W	D	L	GF	GA	GD
33	10	13	10	38	37	+1	43	6	6	4	16	13	+3	4	7	6	22	24	−2

Last updated: 23 April 2025.
Source: Serie A

==== Results by round ====
Round	1	2	3	4	5	6	7	8	9	10	11	12	13	14	15	16	17	18	19	20	21	22	23	24	25	26	27	28	29	30	31	32	33	34	35	36	37	38
Ground	A	H	A	H	A	H	A	A	H	A	H	A	H	H	A	A	H	A	H	H	A	H	A	H	A	H	A	A	H	A	H	A	H	A	H	H	A	H
Result	D	W	W	D	W	L	L	L	W	L	L	L	D	L	D	W	L	D	D	D	D	W	D	D	L	W	W	D	W	D	D	L	W	L	D	L	L	L
Position	7	3	3	5	1	5	7	9	9	10	10	11	11	12	12	11	12	11	11	12	11	10	11	11	12	11	11	11	11	11	10	10	10	10	11	11	11	11

Updated to match(es) played on 2 May 2025. Source: Serie A
A = Away; H = Home; W = Win; D = Draw; L = Loss

==== Matches ====
The match schedule was released on 4 July 2024.

17 August 2024 1	Milan	2–2	Torino	Milan
20:45 CEST (UTC+2)	Jović (yellow card) 57'; Morata 89', (yellow card) 90'; Okafor 90+5'	Report	Thiaw 30' (o.g.); Vojvoda (yellow card) 45+2'; Ricci (yellow card) 45+3'; Zapata 68'; Tameze (yellow card) 90'; Dembélé (yellow card) 90+7'	Stadium: San Siro; Attendance: 70,742; Referee: Fabio Maresca

25 August 2024 2	Torino	2–1	Atalanta	Turin
18:30 CEST (UTC+2)	Ilić 31', (yellow card) 40'; Adams 49'; Zapata (yellow card) 89'; Milinković-Savić (yellow card) 90+2'	Report	Retegui 26'; Pašalić (yellow card) 29', (penalty missed) 90+6'; Hien (yellow card) 38'; Djimsiti (yellow card) 77'; Zaniolo (yellow card) 90+7'	Stadium: Stadio Olimpico Grande Torino; Attendance: 20,451; Referee: Antonio Rapuano

30 August 2024 3	Venezia	0–1	Torino	Venice
18:30 CEST (UTC+2)	Duncan (yellow card) 68'; Altare (yellow card) 83'	Report	Linetty (yellow card) 49'; Vojvoda (yellow card) 52'; Coco 86'; Lazaro (yellow card) 90+1'; Pedersen (yellow card) 90+4'	Stadium: Stadio Pier Luigi Penzo; Attendance: 10,652; Referee: Matteo Marcenaro

15 September 2024 4	Torino	0–0	Lecce	Turin
15:00 CEST (UTC+2)	Walukiewicz (yellow card) 83'	Report	Pierret (yellow card) 23'; Morente (yellow card) 45+1'; Rafia (yellow card) 78'	Stadium: Stadio Olimpico Grande Torino; Attendance: 24,277; Referee: Andrea Colombo

20 September 2024 5	Hellas Verona	2–3	Torino	Verona
20:45 CEST (UTC+2)	Kastanos 12', (yellow card) 58'; Coppola (yellow card) 18'; Dawidowicz (red card) 21'; Mosquera 90+3'; Livramento (yellow card) 90+3'	Report	Sanabria 10', (penalty missed) 23'; Zapata 33'; Adams 79'; Dembélé (yellow card) 90+3'	Stadium: Stadio Marcantonio Bentegodi; Attendance: 23,000; Referee: Livio Marinelli

29 September 2024 6	Torino	2–3	Lazio	Turin
12:30 CEST (UTC+2)	Sanabria (yellow card) 54'; Adams 67'; Ilić (yellow card) 72'; Coco 90+2'	Report	Guendouzi 8'; Dia 60'; Isaksen (yellow card) 62'; Gila (yellow card) 72'; Zaccagni (yellow card) 75'; Noslin 89'	Stadium: Stadio Olimpico Grande Torino; Attendance: 23,130; Referee: Simone Sozza

5 October 2024 7	Internazionale	3–2	Torino	Milan
20:45 CEST (UTC+2)	Thuram 25', 35', 60'; Bisseck (yellow card) 37'	Report	Maripán (red card) 20'; Zapata 36'; Linetty (yellow card) 58'; Vlašić 86' (pen.); Walukiewicz (yellow card) 90+2'	Stadium: San Siro; Attendance: 73,348; Referee: Matteo Marcenaro

20 October 2024 8	Cagliari	3–2	Torino	Cagliari
18:00 CEST (UTC+2)	Viola 38'; Adopo (yellow card) 60'; Palomino 74'; Coco 78' (o.g.)	Report	Coco (yellow card) 14'; Sanabria 41'; Lazaro (yellow card) 45+2'; Masina (yellow card) 54'; Linetty 55'	Stadium: Unipol Domus; Attendance: 16,265; Referee: Gianluca Aureliano

25 October 2024 9	Torino	1–0	Como	Turin
20:45 CEST (UTC+2)	Masina (yellow card) 32'; Linetty (yellow card) 32'; Vojvoda (yellow card) 64'; Njie 75'	Report	Strefezza (yellow card) 3'; Goldaniga (yellow card) 36'; Paz (yellow card) 73'	Stadium: Stadio Olimpico Grande Torino; Attendance: 23,571; Referee: Giovanni Ayroldi

31 October 2024 10	Roma	1–0	Torino	Rome
20:45 CET (UTC+1)	Dybala 20'; Baldanzi (yellow card) 72'; Pellegrini (yellow card) 90+2'	Report	Coco (yellow card) 71'; Masina (yellow card) 86'	Stadium: Stadio Olimpico; Attendance: 60,920; Referee: Michael Fabbri

3 November 2024 11	Torino	0–1	Fiorentina	Turin
15:00 CET (UTC+1)	Ilić (yellow card) 67'; Ricci (yellow card) 74'	Report	Kean 41'; Bove (yellow card) 90+2'	Stadium: Stadio Olimpico Grande Torino; Attendance: 23,326; Referee: Federico La Penna

9 November 2024 12	Juventus	2–0	Torino	Turin
20:45 CET (UTC+1)	Weah 18'; Yıldız 84'; Koopmeiners (yellow card) 90+1'	Report	Lazaro (yellow card) 57'; Walukiewicz (yellow card) 59'; Coco (yellow card) 80'	Stadium: Juventus Stadium; Attendance: 41,066; Referee: Simone Sozza

24 November 2024 13	Torino	1–1	Monza	Turin
15:00 CET (UTC+1)	Adams (yellow card) 45'; Masina 59'	Report	Bianco (yellow card) 61'; Đurić 63'; Izzo (yellow card) 76'	Stadium: Stadio Olimpico Grande Torino; Attendance: 21,944; Referee: Rosario Abisso

1 December 2024 14	Torino	0–1	Napoli	Turin
15:00 CET (UTC+1)	Walukiewicz (yellow card) 39'; Pedersen (yellow card) 41'; Coco (yellow card) 56'; Ricci (yellow card) 84'	Report	McTominay 31'; Zambo Anguissa (yellow card) 81'	Stadium: Stadio Olimpico Grande Torino; Attendance: 25,060; Referee: Michael Fabbri

7 December 2024 15	Genoa	0–0	Torino	Genoa
15:00 CET (UTC+1)	Thorsby (yellow card) 45'; Masini (yellow card) 90+2'	Report	Tameze (yellow card) 90+4'	Stadium: Stadio Luigi Ferraris; Attendance: 32,363; Referee: Livio Marinelli

13 December 2024 16	Empoli	0–1	Torino	Empoli
20:45 CET (UTC+1)	Grassi (yellow card) 80'; Pezzella (yellow card) 84'	Report	Masina (yellow card) 8'; Coco (yellow card) 12'; Adams 70'; Pedersen (yellow card) 84'	Stadium: Stadio Carlo Castellani; Attendance: 7,832; Referee: Kevin Bonacina

21 December 2024 17	Torino	0–2	Bologna	Turin
15:00 CET (UTC+1)		Report	Castro (penalty missed) 8'; Dallinga 71'; Miranda (yellow card) 74'; Pobega 80'; Freuler (yellow card) 85'	Stadium: Stadio Olimpico Grande Torino; Attendance: 19,860; Referee: Marco Piccinini

29 December 2024 18	Udinese	2–2	Torino	Udine
12:30 CET (UTC+1)	Touré 41'; Lucca 49'; Abankwah (yellow card) 87'	Report	Adams 53'; Ricci 64'	Stadium: Stadio Friuli; Attendance: 23,082; Referee: Francesco Fourneau

5 January 2025 19	Torino	0–0	Parma	Turin
15:00 CET (UTC+1)	Ricci (yellow card) 8'; Linetty (yellow card) 80'	Report	Delprato (yellow card) 14'	Stadium: Stadio Olimpico Grande Torino; Attendance: 19,744; Referee: Ermanno Feliciani

11 January 2025 20	Torino	1–1	Juventus	Turin
18:00 CET (UTC+1)	Vojvoda (yellow card) 26'; Vlašić 45+1'; Coco (yellow card) 48'; Linetty (yellow card) 69'; Walukiewicz (yellow card) 90+5'	Report	Yıldız 8'; Douglas Luiz (yellow card) 62'	Stadium: Stadio Olimpico Grande Torino; Attendance: 27,014; Referee: Michael Fabbri

19 January 2025 21	Fiorentina	1–1	Torino	Florence
12:30 CET (UTC+1)	Kean 38', (yellow card) 45'; Gosens (yellow card) 90+1'; Folorunsho (yellow card) 90+3'	Report	Dembélé (yellow card) 27' (yellow-red card) 33'; Gineitis 70'; Njie (yellow card) 78'	Stadium: Stadio Artemio Franchi; Attendance: 19,313; Referee: Livio Marinelli

24 January 2025 22	Torino	2–0	Cagliari	Turin
20:45 CET (UTC+1)	Adams 6', 61'	Report	Zortea (yellow card) 52'	Stadium: Stadio Olimpico Grande Torino; Attendance: 18,992; Referee: Kevin Bonacina

1 February 2025 23	Atalanta	1–1	Torino	Bergamo
18:00 CET (UTC+1)	Djimsiti 35'; Retegui (penalty missed) 74'	Report	Maripán 40'; Coco (yellow card) 45+1'; Tameze (yellow card) 72'; Milinković-Savić (yellow card) 75'	Stadium: Gewiss Stadium; Attendance: 22,547; Referee: Marco Piccinini

8 February 2025 24	Torino	1–1	Genoa	Turin
20:45 CET (UTC+1)	Thorsby 45+2' (o.g.); Coco (yellow card) 70'; Ricci (yellow card) 75'	Report	Pinamonti 68'; Messias (yellow card) 75'; Matturro (yellow card) 86'	Stadium: Stadio Olimpico Grande Torino; Attendance: 22,359; Referee: Ermanno Feliciani

14 February 2025 25	Bologna	3–2	Torino	Bologna
20:45 CET (UTC+1)	Ndoye 20' (Pobega) 70' (pen.); Biraghi 90' (o.g.)	Report	Vlašić 37'; Linetty (yellow card) 52'; Karamoh (yellow card) 60'; Gineitis (yellow card) 63'; Elmas 65' (Adams); Masina (yellow card) 90+4'	Stadium: Stadio Renato Dall'Ara; Attendance: 24,274; Referee: Michael Fabbri

22 February 2025 26	Torino	2–1	AC Milan	Turin
19:00 CET (UTC+1)	Thiaw 5' (o.g.); Ricci (yellow card) 27'; Gineitis 76' (Sanabria)	Report	Musah (yellow card) 16'; Pulisic (penalty missed) '32; Reijnders 74'	Stadium: Stadio Olimpico Grande Torino; Attendance: 28,868; Referee: Simone Sozza

=== Coppa Italia ===
11 August 2024 First round	Torino	2–0	Cosenza	Turin
21:15 CEST (UTC+2)	Camporese 1' (o.g.); Ricci (yellow card) 23'; Zapata 84'	Report	Florenzi (yellow card) 5'; D'Orazio (yellow card) 12'; Kouan (yellow card) 23'; Martino (yellow card) 67'	Stadium: Stadio Olimpico Grande Torino; Attendance: 12,035; Referee: Davide Ghersini

24 September 2024 Second round	Torino	1–2	Empoli	Turin
21:00 CEST (UTC+2)	Walukiewicz (yellow card) 43'; Coco (yellow card) 51'; Linetty (yellow card) 65'; Adams 74'	Report	Ekong 30'; De Sciglio (yellow card) 83'; Haas 90'	Stadium: Stadio Olimpico Grande Torino; Attendance: 12,334; Referee: Davide Ghersini
