= 2023–24 Torino FC season =

Torino
2023–24 season
- Owner: Urbano Cairo
- Chairman: Urbano Cairo
- Head coach: Ivan Jurić
- Stadium: Stadio Olimpico Grande Torino
- Serie A: 9th
- Coppa Italia: Round of 32
- Top goalscorer: League: Duván Zapata (12); All: Duván Zapata (12)
Home colours	Away colours	Third colours

The 2023–24 season was Torino Football Club's 117th season in existence and 12th consecutive season in the Serie A. They also competed in the Coppa Italia.

On 11 May 2024, it was confirmed that Torino head coach Ivan Jurić would leave the club at the end of the season.

== Players ==
=== First-team squad ===
As of 23 January 2024

Note: Flags indicate national team as defined under FIFA eligibility rules; some limited exceptions apply. Players may hold more than one non-FIFA nationality.

No.	Pos.	Nation	Player
1	GK	ITA	Luca Gemello
3	DF	NED	Perr Schuurs
4	DF	ITA	Alessandro Buongiorno
6	DF	CZE	David Zima
7	FW	FRA	Yann Karamoh
8	MF	SRB	Ivan Ilić
9	FW	PAR	Antonio Sanabria
10	FW	SRB	Nemanja Radonjić
11	FW	ITA	Pietro Pellegri
13	DF	SUI	Ricardo Rodriguez (captain)
15	DF	GEO	Saba Sazonov
16	FW	CRO	Nikola Vlašić

No.	Pos.	Nation	Player
19	MF	ITA	Raoul Bellanova
20	MF	AUT	Valentino Lazaro
26	DF	CIV	Koffi Djidji
27	MF	KOS	Mërgim Vojvoda
28	MF	ITA	Samuele Ricci
32	GK	SRB	Vanja Milinković-Savić
61	DF	FRA	Adrien Tamèze
66	MF	LTU	Gvidas Gineitis
71	GK	ROU	Mihai Popa
77	MF	POL	Karol Linetty
91	FW	COL	Duván Zapata (on loan from Atalanta)
93	MF	FRA	Brandon Soppy (on loan from Atalanta)

=== Out on loan ===
As of 23 January 2024

Note: Flags indicate national team as defined under FIFA eligibility rules; some limited exceptions apply. Players may hold more than one non-FIFA nationality.

No.	Pos.	Nation	Player
—	DF	COD	Brian Bayeye (at Ascoli until 30 June 2024)
—	DF	FRA	Ali Dembélé (at Venezia until 30 June 2024)
—	DF	ALB	Kevin Haveri (at Ascoli until 30 June 2024)
—	DF	FRA	Ange Caumenan N'Guessan (at Ternana until 30 June 2024)
—	MF	HUN	Krisztofer Horváth (at Kecskemét until 30 June 2024)
—	MF	TUR	Emirhan İlkhan (at İstanbul Başakşehir until 30 June 2024)

No.	Pos.	Nation	Player
—	MF	CIV	Ben Lhassine Kone (at Como until 30 June 2024)
—	MF	FRA	Daouda Weidmann (at RKC Waalwijk until 30 June 2024)
—	FW	MDA	Lado Akhalaia (at Swift Hesperange until 30 June 2024)
—	FW	ITA	Nicola Rauti (at Sudtirol until 30 June 2024)
—	FW	SEN	Demba Seck (at Frosinone until 30 June 2024)

== Transfers ==
=== In ===
Pos.	Player	Transferred from	Fee	Date	Source
GK	(Romania) Mihai Popa	(Romania) Voluntari	Undisclosed	1 July 2023	
FW	(Serbia) Nemanja Radonjić	(France) Marseille	€1,800,000	1 July 2023	
MF	(Italy) Raoul Bellanova	(Italy) Cagliari	€7,000,000	1 July 2023	
MF	(Cameroon) Adrien Tameze	(Italy) Hellas Verona	Undisclosed	23 July 2023	
FW	(Croatia) Nikola Vlašić	(England) West Ham United	€12,800,000	8 August 2023	
MF	(Austria) Valentino Lazaro	(Italy) Internazionale	€4,000,000	23 August 2023	
DF	(Georgia (country)) Saba Sazonov	(Russia) Dynamo Moscow	€2,800,000	31 August 2023	
MF	(France) Brandon Soppy	(Italy) Atalanta	Loan	1 September 2023	
FW	(Colombia) Duván Zapata	(Italy) Atalanta	Loan	1 September 2023	

=== Out ===
Pos.	Player	Transferred to	Fee	Date	Source
MF	(France) Michel Ndary Adopo	Released		1 July 2023	
MF	(Nigeria) Ola Aina	Released		1 July 2023	
DF	(Italy) Armando Izzo	(Italy) Monza	Free	5 July 2023	
DF	(Ivory Coast) Wilfried Singo	(France) Monaco	Undisclosed	17 August 2023	
FW	(Italy) Simone Verdi	(Italy) Como	Undisclosed	25 August 2023	
MF	(France) Daouda Weidmann	(Netherlands) RKC Waalwijk	Loan	29 August 2023	
GK	(Albania) Etrit Berisha	(Italy) Empoli	Undisclosed	29 August 2023	
MF	(Turkey) Emirhan İlkhan	(Turkey) İstanbul Başakşehir	Loan	30 August 2023	
MF	(France) Brian Bayeye	(Italy) Ascoli	Loan	31 August 2023	
FW	(Senegal) Demba Seck	(Italy) Frosinone	Loan	23 January 2024	

Notes
1.Joined Atalanta on 10 July 2023.
2.Joined Nottingham Forest on 22 July 2023.

== Pre-season and friendlies ==
Win Draw Loss Fixtures

22 July 2023 Friendly	Torino (Italy)	2–0	(Italy) Feralpisalò	Pinzolo
17:00 UTC+2				Stadium: Stadio Pineta

28 July 2023 Friendly	Torino (Italy)	2–1	(Italy) Modena	Pinzolo
17:00 UTC+2				Stadium: Stadio Pineta

2 August 2023 Friendly	Lens (France)	0–0	(Italy) Torino	Lens
19:00 UTC+2				Stadium: Stade Bollaert-Delelis

6 August 2023 Friendly	Reims (France)	2–1	(Italy) Torino	Reims
19:00 UTC+2				Stadium: Stade Auguste-Delaune

== Competitions ==
=== Overall record ===
Competition	First match	Last match	Starting round	Final position	Record							
Competition	First match	Last match	Starting round	Final position	Pld	W	D	L	GF	GA	GD	Win %
Serie A	21 August 2023	26 May 2024	Matchday 1	9th	38	13	14	11	36	36	+0	34.21
Coppa Italia	14 August 2023	2 November 2023	Round of 64	Round of 32	2	1	0	1	3	3	+0	50.00
Total					40	14	14	12	39	39	+0	35.00

Source: Soccerway

=== Serie A ===
==== League table ====
Pos	Team	Pld	W	D	L	GF	GA	GD	Pts	Qualification or relegation
7	Lazio	38	18	7	13	49	39	+10	61	Qualification for the Europa League league phase (Note: Since the winners of the 2023–24 Coppa Italia, Juventus, qualified for the Champions League, the Europa League berth awarded to the Coppa Italia winners was passed to the seventh-placed team, and the Conference League berth was passed to the eighth-placed team.)
8	Fiorentina	38	17	9	12	61	46	+15	60	Qualification for the Conference League play-off round
9	Torino	38	13	14	11	36	36	0	53 (Note: Torino finished ahead of Napoli on head-to-head points: Torino 3–0 Napoli, Napoli 1–1 Torino.)	
10	Napoli	38	13	14	11	55	48	+7	53	
11	Genoa	38	12	13	13	45	45	0	49	

Source: Serie A
Rules for classification: 1) Points; 2) Tiebreaker for Champions team and third relegated team; 3) Head-to-head points; 4) Head-to-head goal difference; 5) Goal difference; 6) Goals scored; 7) Draw.
(Note: Head-to-head record is used only after all the matches between the teams in question have been played)

==== Results summary ====
Overall								Home						Away					
Pld	W	D	L	GF	GA	GD	Pts	W	D	L	GF	GA	GD	W	D	L	GF	GA	GD
38	13	14	11	36	36	0	53	8	9	2	18	9	+9	5	5	9	18	27	−9

Source: Soccerway

==== Results by round ====
Round	1	2	3	4	5	6	7	8	9	10	11	12	13	14	15	16	17	18	19	20	21	22	23	24	25	26	27	28	29	30	31	32	33	34	35	36	37	38
Ground	H	A	H	A	H	A	H	A	H	A	H	A	A	H	A	H	H	A	H	A	H	A	H	A	H	A	H	A	A	H	A	H	H	A	H	A	H	A
Result	D	L	W	W	D	L	D	L	L	W	W	D	L	W	D	W	D	L	W	D	L	W	D	D	W	L	D	D	W	W	L	D	D	L	D	W	W	L
Position	11	16	11	7	9	10	10	14	14	13	12	11	12	10	11	9	10	10	10	10	10	10	10	10	10	10	10	11	11	9	9	9	10	10	10	10	9	9

Source: Soccerway
A = Away; H = Home; W = Win; D = Draw; L = Loss

==== Matches ====
The league fixtures were unveiled on 5 July 2023.

21 August 2023 1	Torino	0–0	Cagliari	Turin
18:30 CEST (UTC+2)	Buongiorno (yellow card) 36'	Report	Pavoletti (yellow card) 90+5'	Stadium: Stadio Olimpico Grande Torino; Attendance: 20,296; Referee: Francesco Cosso

26 August 2023 2	Milan	4–1	Torino	Milan
20:45 CEST (UTC+2)	Pulisic 33'; Hernandez (yellow card) 39', (goal) 45+2'; Giroud 43' (pen.), 65' (pen.); Thiaw (yellow card) 70'	Report	Ilić (yellow card) 11'; Schuurs 36'; Milinković-Savić (yellow card) 57'; Linetty (yellow card) 89'	Stadium: San Siro; Attendance: 72,013; Referee: Maurizio Mariani

3 September 2023 3	Torino	1–0	Genoa	Turin
18:30 CEST (UTC+2)	Seck (yellow card) 71'; Pellegri (yellow card) 75'; Radonjić 90+4'	Report	Badelj (yellow card) 19'; Malinovskyi (yellow card) 21'; Strootman (yellow card) 45+1'; Thorsby (yellow card) 78'; Bani (yellow card) 90+1'	Stadium: Stadio Olimpico Grande Torino; Attendance: 24,433; Referee: Daniele Chiffi

18 September 2023 4	Salernitana	0–3	Torino	Salerno
18:30 CEST (UTC+2)	Gyömbér (yellow card) 43'; Fazio (yellow card) 81'	Report	Buongiorno 15'; Radonjić 41', 50'; Bellanova (yellow card) 46'; Schuurs (yellow card) 74'	Stadium: Stadio Arechi; Attendance: 15,480; Referee: Antonio Giua

24 September 2023 5	Torino	1–1	Roma	Turin
20:45 CEST (UTC+2)	Zapata 85'	Report	Paredes (yellow card) 60'; Lukaku 86'; Kristensen (yellow card) 84'	Stadium: Stadio Olimpico Grande Torino; Attendance: 23,299; Referee: Marco Guida

27 September 2023 6	Lazio	2–0	Torino	Rome
20:45 CEST (UTC+2)	Vecino 56'; Immobile (yellow card) 65'; Zaccagni 75'	Report	Bellanova (yellow card) 33'; Tameze (yellow card) 45+1'; Schuurs (yellow card) 74'; Ricci (yellow card) 82'	Stadium: Stadio Olimpico; Attendance: 35,700; Referee: Michael Fabbri

2 October 2023 7	Torino	0–0	Hellas Verona	Turin
18:30 CEST (UTC+2)	Tameze (yellow card) 71'	Report	Magnani (yellow card) 9'	Stadium: Stadio Olimpico Grande Torino; Attendance: 19,149; Referee: Ermanno Feliciani

7 October 2023 8	Juventus	2–0	Torino	Turin
18:00 CEST (UTC+2)	Gatti 47', (yellow card) 71'; Milik 62'	Report	Bellanova (yellow card) 21'	Stadium: Juventus Stadium; Attendance: 39,602; Referee: Davide Massa

21 October 2023 9	Torino	0–3	Internazionale	Turin
18:00 CEST (UTC+2)	Linetty (yellow card) 80'	Report	Barella (yellow card) 49'; Thuram 59'; Martínez 67'; Çalhanoğlu 90+5' (pen.); Carlos Augusto (yellow card) 90+6'	Stadium: Stadio Olimpico Grande Torino; Attendance: 26,193; Referee: Matteo Marchetti

28 October 2023 10	Lecce	0–1	Torino	Lecce
18:00 CEST (UTC+2)	Gendrey (yellow card) 35'; Rafia (yellow card) 41'; Gallo (yellow card) 78'	Report	Gineitis (yellow card) 11'; Linetty (yellow card) 26'; Lazaro (yellow card) 35'; Buongiorno 41'; Rodriguez (yellow card) 72'; Tameze (yellow card) 90+4'	Stadium: Stadio Via del mare Attendance: 26,123; Referee: Gianluca Aureliano

6 November 2023 11	Torino	2–1	Sassuolo	Turin
20:45 CET (UTC+1)	Sanabria 5', (yellow card) 54'; Vlašić 68'	Report	Thorstvedt 18'; Berardi (yellow card) 86'	Stadium: Stadio Olimpico Grande Torino; Attendance: 18,000; Referee: Maria Sole Ferrieri Caputi

11 November 2023 12	Monza	1–1	Torino	Monza
20:45 CET (UTC+1)	Colpani 65'; Kyriakopoulos (yellow card) 69'; Carboni (yellow card) 89'	Report	Ilić 55'; Gineitis (yellow card) 67'; Radonjić (yellow card) 90+4'	Stadium: Stadio Brianteo; Attendance: 11,777; Referee: Daniele Doveri

27 November 2023 13	Bologna	2–0	Torino	Bologna
20:45 CET (UTC+1)	Kristiansen (yellow card) 23'; Fabbian (yellow card) 31', (goal) 56'; Zirkzee 90+1'; Ndoye (yellow card) 90+6'	Report	Linetty (yellow card) 39'; Lazaro (yellow card) 62'; Bellanova (yellow card) 69'; Pellegri (yellow card) 74'	Stadium: Stadio Renato Dall'Ara; Attendance: 20,705; Referee: Andrea Colombo

4 December 2023 14	Torino	3–0	Atalanta	Turin
20:45 CET (UTC+1)	Linetty (yellow card) 5'; Zapata 22', 90+5'; Buongiorno (yellow card) 45+1'; Sanabria 56' (pen.)	Report	Scalvini (yellow card) 9'; De Roon (yellow card) 75'	Stadium: Stadio Olimpico Grande Torino; Attendance: 18,507; Referee: Marco Piccinini

10 December 2023 15	Frosinone	0–0	Torino	Frosinone
12:30 CET (UTC+1)	Oyono (yellow card) 9'; Kaio (yellow card) 16'; Garritano (yellow card) 57'	Report	Rodriguez (yellow card) 45+3'; Ilić (yellow card) 56'; Tameze (yellow card) 57'	Stadium: Stadio Benito Stirpe; Attendance: 13,807; Referee: Luca Massimi

16 December 2023 16	Torino	1–0	Empoli	Turin
20:45 CET (UTC+1)	Zapata 25'; Linetty (yellow card) 45+4'; Bellanova (yellow card) 71'; Buongiorno (yellow card) 80'; Vlašić (yellow card) 85'	Report	Cacace (yellow card) 81'; Luperto (yellow card) 88'	Stadium: Stadio Olimpico Grande Torino; Attendance: 17,815; Referee: Livio Marinelli

23 December 2023 17	Torino	1–1	Udinese	Turin
15:00 CET (UTC+1)	Sanabria (yellow card) 53'; Ilić 88'; Vojvoda (yellow card) 90+2'	Report	Kamara (yellow card) 48'; Lucca (yellow card) 76'; Zarraga 81'	Stadium: Stadio Olimpico Grande Torino; Attendance: 23,546; Referee: Michael Fabbri

29 December 2023 18	Fiorentina	1–0	Torino	Florence
18:30 CET (UTC+1)	Biraghi (yellow card) 24'; Kayode (yellow card) 68'; Ranieri (yellow card) 75', (goal) 83'; Ikoné (yellow card) 87'	Report	Ricci (yellow card) 55'; Djidji (yellow card) 89'	Stadium: Stadio Artemio Franchi; Attendance: 32,915; Referee: Federico La Penna

7 January 2024 19	Torino	3–0	Napoli	Turin
15:00 CET (UTC+1)	Sanabria 43'; Vlašić 52'; Buongiorno 66'	Report	Zieliński (yellow card) 37'; Mazzocchi (red card) 50'; Juan Jesus (yellow card) 61'	Stadium: Stadio Olimpico Grande Torino; Attendance: 23,960; Referee: Maurizio Mariani

13 January 2024 20	Genoa	0–0	Torino	Genoa
15:00 CET (UTC+1)	De Winter (yellow card) 44'; Malinovskyi (yellow card) 77'; Martín (yellow card) 80'	Report	Vlašić (yellow card) 16'; Buongiorno (yellow card) 81'	Stadium: Stadio Luigi Ferraris; Attendance: 33,019; Referee: Antonio Giua

26 January 2024 22	Cagliari	1–2	Torino	Cagliari
20:45 CET (UTC+1)	Wieteska (yellow card) 41'; Viola (yellow card) 73', (goal) 77'	Report	Zapata 23'; Ricci 45+3', (yellow card) 62'; Milinković-Savić (yellow card) 82'; Buongiorno (yellow card) 83'; Rodriguez (yellow card) 90'	Stadium: Unipol Domus; Attendance: 16,196; Referee: Andrea Colombo

4 February 2024 23	Torino	0–0	Salernitana	Turin
12:30 CET (UTC+1)	Sazonov (yellow card) 26'; Linetty (yellow card) 90'	Report	Pierozzi (yellow card) 63'	Stadium: Stadio Olimpico Grande Torino; Attendance: 24,461; Referee: Daniele Chiffi

10 February 2024 24	Sassuolo	1–1	Torino	Reggio Emilia
20:45 CET (UTC+1)	Pinamonti 5'; Doig (yellow card) 33'	Report	Zapata 9'; Lovato (yellow card) 66'; Tameze (yellow card) 82'; Vlašić (yellow card) 90'	Stadium: Mapei Stadium – Città del Tricolore; Attendance: 10,955; Referee: Daniele Orsato

16 February 2024 25	Torino	2–0	Lecce	Turin
19:00 CET (UTC+1)	Djidji (yellow card) 45'; Bellanova 50'; Zapata 81'	Report	Pongračić (yellow card) 41' (yellow-red card) 70'; Blin (yellow card) 50'; Dorgu (yellow card) 78'	Stadium: Stadio Olimpico Grande Torino; Attendance: 22,457; Referee: Giovanni Ayroldi

22 February 2024 21	Torino	0–2	Lazio	Turin
20:45 CET (UTC+1)	Ilić (yellow card) 15'; Linetty (yellow card) 27'; Lovato (yellow card) 72'	Report	Guendouzi 50'; Cataldi 56'; Gila (yellow card) 65' (yellow-red card) 79'	Stadium: Stadio Olimpico Grande Torino; Attendance: 22,742; Referee: Federico La Penna
Note: The match was rescheduled due to Lazio's participation in the 2023 Supercoppa Italiana.

26 February 2024 26	Roma	3–2	Torino	Rome
18:00 CET (UTC+1)	Dybala 42' (pen.), 57', 69'; Ndicka (yellow card) 45+1'; Cristante (yellow card) 85'	Report	Lazaro (yellow card) 25'; Ricci (yellow card) 33'; Zapata 44'; Huijsen 89' (o.g.)	Stadium: Stadio Olimpico; Attendance: 61,595; Referee: Juan Luca Sacchi

2 March 2024 27	Torino	0–0	Fiorentina	Turin
20:45 CET (UTC+1)	Ricci (yellow card) 45+5' (yellow-red card) 45+7'	Report	Ranieri (yellow card) 7'; Beltrán (yellow card) 41'; Arthur (yellow card) 45+7'; Barák (yellow card) 83'	Stadium: Stadio Olimpico Grande Torino; Attendance: 22,845; Referee: Matteo Marchetti

8 March 2024 28	Napoli	1–1	Torino	Naples
20:45 CET (UTC+1)	Osimhen (yellow card) 36'; Juan Jesus (yellow card) 39'; Kvaratskhelia 61'	Report	Zapata (yellow card) 32'; Buongiorno (yellow card) 45+3'; Sanabria 64'	Stadium: Stadio Diego Armando Maradona; Attendance: 47,000; Referee: Daniele Orsato

16 March 2024 29	Udinese	0–2	Torino	Udine
15:00 CET (UTC+1)	Walace (yellow card) 43'; Ehizibue (yellow card) 45'; Gianetti (yellow card) 57'	Report	Zapata 10'; Buongiorno (yellow card) 52'; Vlašić 53'; Sazonov (yellow card) 87'	Stadium: Stadio Friuli; Attendance: 21,223; Referee: Andrea Colombo

30 March 2024 30	Torino	1–0	Monza	Turin
15:00 CET (UTC+1)	Sanabria 69' (pen.)	Report	Pessina (yellow card) 67' (yellow-red card) 72'; Caldirola (yellow card) 76'	Stadium: Stadio Olimpico Grande Torino; Attendance: 24,286; Referee: Gianluca Aureliano

6 April 2024 31	Empoli	3–2	Torino	Empoli
20:45 CEST (UTC+2)	Cambiaghi 6'; Walukiewicz (yellow card) 11'; Cerri (yellow card) 27'; Cancellieri 74'; Niang 90+4'	Report	Zapata (yellow card) 39', (goal) 60', 90+1'	Stadium: Stadio Carlo Castellani; Attendance: 8,374; Referee: Davide Massa

13 April 2024 32	Torino	0–0	Juventus	Turin
18:00 CEST (UTC+2)	Ricci (yellow card) 45+3'; Vojvoda (yellow card) 45+4'; Linetty (yellow card) 76'	Report	Gatti (yellow card) 44'; Cambiaso (yellow card) 70'	Stadium: Stadio Olimpico Grande Torino; Attendance: 27,788; Referee: Fabio Maresca

21 April 2024 33	Torino	0–0	Frosinone	Turin
15:00 CEST (UTC+2)	Linetty (yellow card) 61'; Tameze (yellow card) 87'	Report	Valeri (yellow card) 34'; Okoli (yellow card) 83'	Stadium: Stadio Olimpico Grande Torino; Attendance: 23,728; Referee: Antonio Rapuano

28 April 2024 34	Internazionale	2–0	Torino	Milan
12:30 CEST (UTC+2)	Çalhanoğlu 56', 60' (pen.)	Report	Tameze (red card) 49'	Stadium: San Siro; Attendance: 71,686; Referee: Maria Sole Ferrieri Caputi

3 May 2024 35	Torino	0–0	Bologna	Turin
20:45 CEST (UTC+2)	Vojvoda (yellow card) 8'; Rodriguez (yellow card) 50'	Report	Fabbian (yellow card) 13'; Aebischer (yellow card) 52'	Stadium: Stadio Olimpico Grande Torino; Attendance: 23,895; Referee: Simone Sozza

12 May 2024 36	Hellas Verona	1–2	Torino	Verona
15:00 CEST (UTC+2)	Noslin (yellow card) 38'; Magnani (yellow card) 44'; Świderski 67'; Suslov (yellow card) 90+3'; Henry (red card) 90+6'	Report	Savva 77'; Pellegri 83', (yellow card) 90+3'; Linetty (yellow card) 90+4'	Stadium: Stadio Marcantonio Bentegodi; Attendance: 25,964; Referee: Livio Marinelli

18 May 2024 37	Torino	3–1	Milan	Turin
20:45 CEST (UTC+2)	Zapata 26'; Ilić 40'; Rodriguez 46'; Ricci (yellow card) 90+5'	Report	Bennacer 55' (pen.); Tomori (yellow card) 78'	Stadium: Stadio Olimpico Grande Torino; Attendance: 24,638; Referee: Ermanno Feliciani

26 May 2024 38	Atalanta	3–0	Torino	Bergamo
18:00 CEST (UTC+2)	Scamacca 26'; Lookman 43'; Pašalić 71' (pen.); Hien (yellow card) 77'	Report	Linetty (yellow card) 58'	Stadium: Gewiss Stadium; Attendance: 14,839; Referee: Simone Sozza

=== Coppa Italia ===
14 August 2023 Round of 64	Torino	2–1	Feralpisalò	Turin
21:15 CEST (UTC+2)	Vojvoda 22', (yellow card) 68'; Ilić 85'	Report	Di Molfetta 17'; Bergonzi (yellow card) 35'	Stadium: Stadio Olimpico Grande Torino; Attendance: 9,067; Referee: Paride Tremolada

2 November 2023 Round of 32	Torino	1–2 (a.e.t.)	Frosinone	Turin
21:00 CET (UTC+1)	Zima 31'	Report	Ibrahimović 5', (yellow card) 74'; Reinier 98'; Soulé (yellow card) 109'	Stadium: Stadio Olimpico Grande Torino; Attendance: 5,233; Referee: Francesco Fourneau

== Statistics ==
=== Appearances and goals ===
No.	Pos	Nat	Player	Total		Serie A		Coppa Italia	
No.	Pos	Nat	Player	Apps	Goals	Apps	Goals	Apps	Goals
Goalkeepers
1	GK	(Italy) ITA	Luca Gemello	3	0	2	0	1	0
32	GK	(Serbia) SRB	Vanja Milinković-Savić	37	0	36	0	1	0
71	GK	(Romania) ROU	Mihai Popa	0	0	0	0	0	0
Defenders
3	DF	(Netherlands) NED	Perr Schuurs	10	1	9	1	1	0
4	DF	(Italy) ITA	Alessandro Buongiorno	31	3	29	3	2	0
5	DF	(Morocco) MAR	Adam Masina	16	0	10+6	0	0	0
6	DF	(Italy) ITA	Matteo Lovato	13	0	6+7	0	0	0
13	DF	(Switzerland) SUI	Ricardo Rodriguez	37	1	34+1	1	2	0
15	DF	(Georgia (country)) GEO	Saba Sazonov	12	0	2+10	0	0	0
25	DF	(Italy) ITA	Alessandro Dellavalle	1	0	0+1	0	0	0
26	DF	(Ivory Coast) CIV	Koffi Djidji	13	0	8+5	0	0	0
61	DF	(France) FRA	Adrien Tameze	31	0	25+4	0	1+1	0
Midfielders
8	MF	(Serbia) SRB	Ivan Ilić	33	4	25+6	3	1+1	1
19	MF	(Italy) ITA	Raoul Bellanova	39	1	36+1	1	1+1	0
20	MF	(Austria) AUT	Valentino Lazaro	27	0	12+14	0	1	0
27	MF	(Kosovo) KOS	Mërgim Vojvoda	30	1	15+13	0	2	1
28	MF	(Italy) ITA	Samuele Ricci	33	1	28+4	1	1	0
66	MF	(Lithuania) LTU	Gvidas Gineitis	19	0	14+4	0	1	0
77	MF	(Poland) POL	Karol Linetty	29	0	19+9	0	1	0
93	MF	(France) FRA	Brandon Soppy	0	0	0	0	0	0
Forwards
9	FW	(Paraguay) PAR	Antonio Sanabria	37	5	23+12	5	2	0
11	FW	(Italy) ITA	Pietro Pellegri	33	1	24+7	1	0+2	0
16	FW	(Croatia) CRO	Nikola Vlašić	35	3	30+3	3	1+1	0
21	FW	(Nigeria) NGR	David Okereke	9	0	3+6	0	0	0
79	FW	(Cyprus) CYP	Zanos Savva	2	1	0+2	1	0	0
91	FW	(Colombia) COL	Duván Zapata	36	12	34+1	12	1	0
Players transferred out during the season
2	MF	(Democratic Republic of the Congo) COD	Brian Bayeye	1	0	0	0	0+1	0
6	DF	(Czech Republic) CZE	David Zima	6	1	0+5	0	1	1
7	FW	(France) FRA	Yann Karamoh	12	0	10+1	0	0+1	0
10	FW	(Serbia) SRB	Nemanja Radonjić	11	3	4+6	3	1	0
17	DF	(Ivory Coast) CIV	Wilfried Singo	1	0	0	0	0+1	0
23	FW	(Senegal) SEN	Demba Seck	10	0	5+4	0	0+1	0
99	FW	(Italy) ITA	Simone Verdi	2	0	0+1	0	0+1	0

Last updated: 26 May 2024
Source: Competitions
