= 2016–17 Stade Malherbe Caen season =

SM Caen
2016–17 season
- Chairman: Jean-François Fortin
- Manager: Patrice Garande
- Stadium: Stade Michel d'Ornano
- Ligue 1: 17th
- Coupe de France: Round of 32
- Coupe de la Ligue: Round of 32
- Top goalscorer: League: Ivan Santini (15); All: Ivan Santini (16)
- Highest home attendance: 20,054 (vs. Marseille, 30 April 2017)
- Lowest home attendance: 13,243 (vs. Dijon, 2 December 2016)
Home colours	Away colours	Third colours

The 2016–17 Stade Malherbe Caen season was the 104th season of the club since its creation in 1913, the 16th in Ligue 1.

== Players ==
French teams are limited to four players without EU citizenship. Hence, the squad list includes only the principal nationality of each player; several non-European players on the squad have dual citizenship with an EU country. Also, players from the ACP countries—countries in Africa, the Caribbean, and the Pacific that are signatories to the Cotonou Agreement—are not counted against non-EU quotas due to the Kolpak ruling.

=== Current squad ===
As of 13 July 2016.

Note: Flags indicate national team as defined under FIFA eligibility rules; some limited exceptions apply. Players may hold more than one non-FIFA nationality.

No.	Pos.	Nation	Player
1	GK	FRA	Rémy Vercoutre
2	MF	FRA	Nicolas Seube
4	MF	CIV	Ismaël Diomandé
5	DF	TUN	Alaeddine Yahia
6	MF	FRA	Jonathan Delaplace
7	FW	CIV	Yann Karamoh
8	MF	COD	Jordan Nkololo
10	MF	FRA	Steed Malbranque
11	MF	FRA	Vincent Bessat
12	FW	FRA	Ronny Rodelin
13	DF	TUN	Syam Ben Youssef
14	FW	HAI	Jeff Louis
15	DF	BEN	Emmanuel Imorou
16	GK	FRA	Louis Deschateaux
17	MF	FRA	Jean-Victor Makengo

No.	Pos.	Nation	Player
18	MF	BEN	Jordan Adéoti
19	MF	FRA	Jordan Leborgne
20	FW	HAI	Hervé Bazile
21	DF	COM	Chaker Alhadhur
22	FW	SEN	Pape Sané
23	FW	FRA	Mouhamadou Dabo
24	DF	FRA	Frédéric Guilbert
25	MF	FRA	Julien Féret (captain)
26	FW	CRO	Ivan Santini
27	MF	FRA	Valentin Voisin
28	DF	FRA	Damien Da Silva
29	DF	HAI	Romain Genevois
30	GK	FRA	Paul Reulet
40	GK	FRA	Matthieu Dreyer

=== Out on loan ===
Note: Flags indicate national team as defined under FIFA eligibility rules; some limited exceptions apply. Players may hold more than one non-FIFA nationality.

No.	Pos.	Nation	Player

== Transfers ==
=== Transfers in ===
Date	Pos.	Player	Age	Moved from	Fee	Notes
1 July 2016	MF	(Ivory Coast) Ismaël Diomandé	23	(France) Saint-Étienne	€750,000	
1 July 2016	MF	(France) Mouhamadou Dabo	29	(France) Troyes	Free Transfer	
1 July 2016	MF	(France) Steed Malbranque	36	(France) Lyon	Free Transfer	
8 July 2016	DF	(Haiti) Romain Genevois	28	(France) Nice	Free Transfer	
26 July 2016	FW	(France) Ronny Rodelin	26	(France) Lille	€1 Million	
3 August 2016	FW	(Croatia) Ivan Santini	27	(Belgium) Standard Liège	€2.5 Million	
8 August 2016	GK	(France) Matthieu Dreyer	27	(France) Troyes	Free Transfer	

=== Loans in ===
Date	Pos.	Player	Age	Loaned from	Return date	Notes
24 October 2016	DF	(France) Frédéric Guilbert	21	(France) Bordeaux	30 June 2017	

=== Transfers out ===
Date	Pos.	Player	Age	Moved to	Fee	Notes
1 July 2016	MF	(Burundi) Saidi Ntibazonkiza	29	Free agent	Released	
1 July 2016	MF	(France) Jonathan Beaulieu	23	Free agent	Released	
1 July 2016	DF	(France) Cheick Traoré	21	(France) Châteauroux	Free transfer	
1 July 2016	DF	(France) Dennis Appiah	24	(Belgium) Anderlecht	€3 Million	
7 July 2016	MF	(France) Alexandre Raineau	29	(France) Châteauroux	Free transfer	
2 September 2016	FW	(France) Andy Delort	24	(Mexico) Tigres UANL	€8 Million	

=== Loans out ===
Date	Pos.	Player	Age	Loaned to	Return date	Notes
1 July 2016	MF	(France) Florian Le Joncour	21	(France) Avranches	30 June 2016	
31 August 2016	FW	(Ivory Coast) Christian Kouakou	25	(France) Nîmes Olympique	30 June 2017	
16 January 2017	FW	(France) Jordan Nkololo	24	(France) Stade Laval	30 June 2017	

== Competitions ==
=== Ligue 1 ===
==== League table ====
Pos	Team	Pld	W	D	L	GF	GA	GD	Pts	Qualification or relegation
15	Montpellier	38	10	9	19	48	66	−18	39	
16	Dijon	38	8	13	17	46	58	−12	37	
17	Caen	38	10	7	21	36	65	−29	37	
18	Lorient (R)	38	10	6	22	44	70	−26	36	Qualification for the relegation play-offs
19	Nancy (R)	38	9	8	21	29	52	−23	35	Relegation to Ligue 2

Source: Ligue 1, Soccerway
Rules for classification: 1) Points; 2) Goal difference; 3) Goals scored; 4) Head-to-head goal difference; 5) Fairplay ranking.
(R) Relegated

==== Results summary ====
Overall								Home						Away					
Pld	W	D	L	GF	GA	GD	Pts	W	D	L	GF	GA	GD	W	D	L	GF	GA	GD
38	10	7	21	36	65	−29	37	7	2	10	21	37	−16	3	5	11	15	28	−13

Last updated: 12 February 2018.
Source: Results

==== Results by round ====
Round	1	2	3	4	5	6	7	8	9	10	11	12	13	14	15	16	17	18	19	20	21	22	23	24	25	26	27	28	29	30	31	32	33	34	35	36	37	38
Ground	A	H	A	H	H	A	H	A	H	A	H	A	H	H	A	H	A	H	A	H	A	H	A	H	A	H	A	H	A	A	H	A	H	A	A	H	A	H
Result	L	L	W	W	W	L	W	W	L	L	W	L	D	W	D	L	L	D	L	L	W	L	L	W	D	D	L	W	L	L	L	L	D	D	L	W	L	D
Position	2	12	6	10	14	14	15	13	16	18	18	15	15	15	18	17	18	16	18	15	17	18	15	16	18	15	14	14	15	16	16	16	16	17	18	16	17	17

Source: Ligue1
A = Away; H = Home; W = Win; D = Draw; L = Loss

==== Matches ====
Win Draw Loss

13 August 2016 1	Caen	3–2	Lorient	Caen
20:00 CEST (UTC+2)	Rodelin 32'; Santini 43', 87'; Yahia (yellow card) 86'	Report	Moukandjo 5', 19' (pen.); Le Goff (yellow card) 22'; Toure (red card) 26'; Selemani (yellow card) 85'	Stadium: Stade Michel d'Ornano; Attendance: 16,920; Referee: Johan Hamel

19 August 2016 2	Lyon	2–0	Caen	Lyon
20:45 CEST (UTC+2)	Lacazette 31', 90+6' (pen.); Yanga-Mbiwa (yellow card) 69'; Lacazette (yellow card) 87'; Gonalons (yellow card) 90+4'	Report	Dabo (yellow card) 28'; Santini (yellow card) 30'; Malbranque (yellow card) 90+1'; Ben Youssef (yellow card) 90+5'	Stadium: Parc Olympique Lyonnais; Attendance: 41,171; Referee: Benoît Millot

27 August 2016 3	Caen	2–0	Bastia	Caen
20:00 CEST (UTC+2)	Ben Youssef (yellow card) 58'; Féret 64'; Bazile 90+3'		Mostefa (yellow card) 60'; Crivelli (yellow card) 65'; Bifouma (yellow card) 68'; Marange (yellow card) 85'; Squillaci (yellow card) 88'	Stadium: Stade Michel d'Ornano; Attendance: 15,695; Referee: Lionel Jaffredo

11 September 2016 4	Rennes	2–0	Caen	Rennes
17:00 CEST (UTC+2)	Fernandes (yellow card) 23'; Saïd 47' Gourcuff (yellow card) 59'; Prcić 90+3'	Report	Genevois (yellow card) 85'	Stadium: Roazhon Park; Attendance: 20,584; Referee: Amaury Delerue

16 September 2016 5	Caen	0–6	Paris Saint-Germain	Caen
20:45 CEST (UTC+2)	Ben Youssef (yellow card) 22'	Report	Cavani 12', 23' (pen.), 38', 45+1'; Lucas 67'; Augustin 79'; Kimpembe (yellow card) 60'	Stadium: Stade Michel d'Ornano; Attendance: 19,206; Referee: Clément Turpin

21 September 2016 6	Angers	2–1	Caen	Angers
19:00 CEST (UTC+2)	Ketkeophomphone 12'; Da Silva 54' (o.g.)	Report	Karamoh 71'; Féret (yellow card) 30'	Stadium: Stade Jean-Bouin; Attendance: 10,504; Referee: François Letexier

24 September 2016 7	Bordeaux	0–0	Caen	Bordeaux
20:00 CEST (UTC+2)		Report	Karamoh (yellow card) 25'; Bessat (yellow card) 90'	Stadium: Matmut Atlantique; Attendance: 17,476; Referee: Karim Abed

1 October 2016 8	Caen	1–0	Toulouse	Caen
20:00 CEST (UTC+2)	Santini 64' (pen.); Santini (yellow card) 20'	Report	Jullien (yellow card) 28'; Sylla (yellow card) 37'; Michelin (yellow card) 52'; Trejo (yellow card) 62'; Diop (yellow card) 70'; Braithwaite (yellow card) 82'	Stadium: Stade Michel d'Ornano; Attendance: 16,354; Referee: Benoît Bastien

15 October 2016 9	Montpellier	3–2	Caen	Montpellier
20:00 CEST (UTC+2)	Ninga 2', 76'; Mounié (yellow card) 30' (red card) 71', (goal) 65'	Report	Yahia 8'; Santini 69'	Stadium: Stade de la Mosson; Attendance: 14,456; Referee: Saïd Ennjimi

23 October 2016 10	Caen	0–2	Saint-Étienne	Caen
15:00 CEST (UTC+2)	Bessat (yellow card) 62'	Report	Saivet (yellow card) 28', (goal) 49'; Veretout 58'	Stadium: Stade Michel d'Ornano; Attendance: 18,504; Referee: Olivier Thual

29 October 2016 11	Nancy	2–0	Caen	Nancy
20:00 CEST (UTC+2)	Mandanne 6'; Diarra 12', (yellow card) 68'; Pedretti (yellow card) 65'; N'Guessan (yellow card) 90+2'	Report	Yahia (yellow card) 76'; Rodelin (yellow card) 82'; Delaplace (yellow card) 90+2'	Stadium: Stade Marcel Picot; Attendance: 16,896; Referee: Tony Chapron

6 November 2016 12	Caen	1–0	Nice	Caen
15:00 CET (UTC+1)	Santini 42' (pen.); Makengo (yellow card) 65'; Vercoutre (yellow card) 79'	Report	Dante (yellow card) 26'; Pléa (yellow card) 79'; Balotelli (yellow card) 84'	Stadium: Stade Michel d'Ornano; Attendance: 16,225; Referee: Johan Hamel

20 November 2016 13	Marseille	1–0	Caen	Marseille
17:00 CET (UTC+1)	Rolando 81'; Machach (yellow card) 27'; Gomis (yellow card) 45+2'	Report	Seube (yellow card) 45+2'	Stadium: Stade Vélodrome; Attendance: 36,008; Referee: Stéphane Lannoy

26 November 2016 14	Caen	1–1	Guingamp	Caen
20:00 CEST (UTC+01:00)	Rodelin 79'	Report	Sankoh (yellow card) 44'; Martins Pereira (yellow card) 78'; De Pauw 85'	Stadium: Stade Michel d'Ornano; Attendance: 14,902; Referee: Amaury Delerue

29 November 2016 15	Lille	4–2	Caen	Lille
19:00 CEST (UTC+01:00)	Eder 12'; Sliti 24'; De Préville 64'; Lopes 65'	Report	Féret 31'; Ben Youssef (yellow card) 74'; Rodelin 84'	Stadium: Stade Pierre-Mauroy; Attendance: 23,216; Referee: Saïd Ennjimi

2 December 2016 16	Caen	3–3	Dijon	Caen
20:45 CEST (UTC+01:00)	Santini 24', 37', (yellow card) 59'; Rodelin (yellow card) 28'; Karamoh 43'; Yahia (yellow card) 48'; Delaplace (yellow card) 77'	Report	Lees-Melou 26'; Bouka Moutou (yellow card) 29' (yellow-red card) 31'; Rüfli (yellow card) 51'; Abeid (yellow card) 56'; Diony 59'; Yahia 81' (o.g.)	Stadium: Stade Michel d'Ornano; Attendance: 13,243; Referee: Sébastien Moreira

18 December 2016 17	Caen	3–0	Metz	Caen
14:30 CEST (UTC+01:00)	Karamoh 20', (yellow card) 83'; Santini (yellow card) 53', (goal) 61'; Sané 90+3'	Report	Mandjeck (yellow card) 48'; Rivierez (yellow card) 53'; Biševac (red card) 57'; Milán (yellow card) 89'	Stadium: Stade Michel d'Ornano; Attendance: 16,849; Referee: (France) François Letexier

21 December 2016 18	Monaco	2–1	Caen	Monaco
20:50 CEST (UTC+01:00)	Falcao (yellow card) 40', (goal) 48' (pen.); Mbappé (yellow card) 54'; Glik (yellow card) 65'; Bakayoko 76'	Report	Da Silva (yellow card) 2' (yellow-red card) 51'; Bazile 90+4'	Stadium: Stade Louis II; Attendance: 4,319; Referee: (France) Bartolomeu Varela

15 January 2017 19	Caen	3–2	Lyon	Caen
17:00 CEST (UTC+01:00)	Guilbert (yellow card) 1'; Cornet 8' (o.g.); Santini 29' (pen.), 61', (yellow card) 41'; Bazile (yellow card) 84'	Report	Lacazette 35' (pen.), 45'; Diakhaby (yellow card) 38'; Fekir (yellow card) 48'; Rybus (yellow card) 87'	Stadium: Stade Michel d'Ornano; Attendance: 18,935; Referee: (France) Frank Schneider

18 January 2017 20	Nantes	1–0	Caen	Nantes
20:00 CEST (UTC+01:00)	Djidji (yellow card) 22'; Harit (yellow card) 32'; Sala 64'	Report	Santini (yellow card) 35'; Malbranque (yellow card) 70'	Stadium: Stade de la Beaujoire; Attendance: 17,818; Referee: (France) Jérôme Miguelgorry

28 January 2017 21	Bastia	1–1	Caen	Furiani
20:00 CEST (UTC+01:00)	Saint-Maximin 26'; Mostefa (yellow card) 45+1'; Rose (yellow card) 90'	Report	Rodelin 45' (pen.); Da Silva (yellow card) 45+1'; Adéoti (yellow card) 90+3'	Stadium: Stade Armand Cesari; Attendance: 9,350; Referee: (France) Amaury Delerue

4 February 2017 22	Guingamp	0–1	Caen	Guingamp
20:00 CEST (UTC+01:00)	Diallo (yellow card) 38'	Summary	Bessat (yellow card) 69'; Yahia (yellow card) 83'; Karamoh 90+3'	Stadium: Stade de Roudourou; Attendance: 14,428; Referee: (France) Johan Hamel

7 February 2017 23	Caen	0–4	Bordeaux	Caen
19:00 CEST (UTC+01:00)	Adéoti (yellow card) 51'	Summary	Sabaly (yellow card) 10'; Rolán 11'; Kamano 22', 63'; Plašil 90'	Stadium: Stade Michel d'Ornano; Attendance: 15,542; Referee: (France) Benoît Bastien

11 February 2017 24	Dijon	2–0	Caen	Dijon
20:00 CEST (UTC+01:00)	Abeid 40'; Marié (yellow card) 46'; Diony 86'	Summary		Stadium: Stade Gaston Gérard; Attendance: 9,614; Referee: (France) Jérôme Brisard

18 February 2017 25	Caen	0–1	Lille	Caen
20:00 CEST (UTC+01:00)	Yahia (yellow card) 55'	Summary	El Ghazi (yellow card) 31', (goal) 69'; Soumaoro (red card) 63'	Stadium: Stade Michel d'Ornano; Attendance: 15,897; Referee: (France) Karim Abed

21 February 2017 26	Caen	1–0	Nancy	Caen
18:30 CEST (UTC+01:00)	Rodelin 24'; Delaplace (yellow card) 66'; Guilbert (yellow card) 69'; Seube (yellow card) 73'	Report	Pedretti (yellow card) 3'; Guidileye (yellow card) 43'; Maouassa (yellow card) 51' (yellow-red card) 78'	Stadium: Stade Michel d'Ornano; Attendance: 14,760; Referee: (France) Nicolas Rainville

26 February 2017 27	Saint-Étienne	0–1	Caen	Saint-Étienne
15:00 CEST (UTC+01:00)		Report	Rodelin 32', (yellow card) 74'; Seube (yellow card) 79'	Stadium: Stade Geoffroy-Guichard; Attendance: 26,196; Referee: (France) Ruddy Buquet

4 March 2017 28	Caen	2–3	Angers	Caen
20:00 CEST (UTC+01:00)	Rodelin 11'; Guilbert (yellow card) 35'; Santini 67'	Report	Toko Ekambi 5'; N'Doye 21', (yellow card) 73'; Mangani 48' (pen.); Martinez (yellow card) 88'	Stadium: Stade Michel d'Ornano; Attendance: 16,564; Referee: (France) Tony Chapron

10 March 2017 29	Nice	2–2	Caen	Nice
19:00 CEST (UTC+01:00)	Souquet (yellow card) 41'; Balotelli 71'; Donis 77', (yellow card) 89'	Report	Santini 36'; Karamoh 50'; Ben Youssef (yellow card) 56'	Stadium: Allianz Riviera; Attendance: 23,640; Referee: (France) François Letexier

19 March 2017 30	Caen	0–3	Monaco	Caen
15:00 CEST (UTC+01:00)	Da Silva (yellow card) 38'	Report	Mbappé 13', 81'; Fabinho 49' (pen.)	Stadium: Stade Michel d'Ornano; Attendance: 19,399; Referee: (France) Antony Gautier

2 April 2017 31	Lorient	1–0	Caen	Lorient
17:00 CEST (UTC+01:00)	Moukandjo 29'; Bellugou (red card) 49'; Ciani (yellow card) 54'	Summary	Yahia (yellow card) 70'; Da Silva (red card) 81'	Stadium: Stade du Moustoir - Yves Allainmat; Attendance: 14,149; Referee: (France) Karim Abed

8 April 2017 32	Caen	0–2	Montpellier	Caen
20:00 CEST (UTC+01:00)	Guilbert (yellow card) 13'; Santini (yellow card) 50'; Vercoutre (yellow card) 77'; Yahia (yellow card) 77'	Summary	Sessègnon 49'; Congré (yellow card) 55'; Boudebouz (yellow card) 56'; Ikoné (yellow card) 77', (goal) 88'	Stadium: Stade Michel d'Ornano; Attendance: 17,286; Referee: (France) Frank Schneider

15 April 2017 33	Metz	2–2	Caen	Metz
20:00 CEST (UTC+01:00)	Sarr 65'; Diabaté 83'; Biševac (yellow card) 90+4'	Summary	Adéoti (yellow card) 56'; Santini 74'; Rodelin 88'	Stadium: Stade Saint-Symphorien; Attendance: 16,038; Referee: (France) Bartolomeu Varela

22 April 2017 34	Caen	0–2	Nantes	Caen
20:00 CEST (UTC+01:00)	Ben Youssef (yellow card) 36'	Summary	Bammou 27', 35'; Dupé (yellow card) 79'	Stadium: Stade Michel d'Ornano; Attendance: 15,972; Referee: (France) Jérôme Brisard

30 April 2017 35	Caen	1–5	Marseille	Caen
15:00 CEST (UTC+01:00)	Santini 9'; Imorou (yellow card) 15'; Rodelin (yellow card) 56'	Summary	Thauvin 2', 63', 89'; Lopez 5', 27', (yellow card) 10'; Sakai (yellow card) 17'; Vainqueur (yellow card) 45+1'; Pelé (yellow card) 58'	Stadium: Stade Michel d'Ornano; Attendance: 20,054; Referee: (France) Amaury Delerue

6 May 2017 36	Toulouse	0–1	Caen	Toulouse
20:00 CEST (UTC+02:00)	Toivonen (yellow card) 45+1'; Yago (yellow card) 63'; Diop (yellow card) 70'	Report	Diomandé (yellow card) 24'; Santini 58'; Makengo (yellow card) 62'	Stadium: Stadium Municipal; Attendance: 18,474; Referee: Karim Abed

14 May 2017 37	Caen	0–1	Rennes	Caen
21:00 CEST (UTC+02:00)	Da Silva (yellow card) 66'; Diomande (yellow card) 87'	Report	Sio (yellow card) 43', (goal) 68'	Stadium: Stade Michel d'Ornano; Attendance: 16,273; Referee: Benoît Millot

20 May 2017 38	Paris Saint-Germain	1–1	Caen	Paris
21:00 CEST (UTC+02:00)	Rabiot 13'	Report	Diomande (yellow card) 25'; Rodelin 90+1'	Stadium: Parc des Princes; Attendance: 45,516; Referee: Johan Hamel

=== Coupe de France ===
8 January 2017 Round of 64	Sainte-Geneviève Sports	0–3	Caen	Sainte-Geneviève-des-Bois
14:15 CEST (UTC+2)	Houssein Marega (yellow card) 34'	Report	Rodelin 25', 45'; Santini 58' (pen.)	Stadium: Stade Léo Lagrange; Attendance: 1,545; Referee: (France) Clément Turpin

1 February 2017 Round of 32	Angers	3–1	Caen	Angers
18:00 CEST (UTC+2)	Mangani 14' (pen.), 82' (pen.); Capelle 89'	Report	Thomas 36' (o.g.); Makengo (yellow card) 71'; Diomandé (yellow card) 90+2'	Stadium: Stade Raymond Kopa; Attendance: 4,059; Referee: (France) Tony Chapron

=== Coupe de la Ligue ===
26 October 2016 Round of 32	Nancy	4–2	Caen	Nancy
21:05 CEST (UTC+2)	Puyo 8', 61'; Mandanne 15', 37'; Guidileye (yellow card) 76'	Report	Makengo 14', 50', (yellow card) 51'; Leborgne (yellow card) 87'	Stadium: Stade Marcel Picot; Attendance: 14,015; Referee: Frank Schneider

== Goalscorers ==
As of match played 12 February 2018

Place	Position	Nation	Number	Name	Ligue 1	Coupe de France	Coupe de la Ligue	Total
1	FW	(Croatia)	26	Ivan Santini	15	1	0	16
2	FW	(France)	12	Ronny Rodelin	9	2	0	11
3	FW	(Ivory Coast)	7	Yann Karamoh	5	0	0	5
4	MF	(France)	25	Julien Féret	2	0	0	2
4	FW	(Haiti)	20	Hervé Bazile	2	0	0	2
4	MF	(France)	17	Jean-Victor Makengo	0	2	0	2
7	DF	(Tunisia)	5	Alaeddine Yahia	1	0	0	1
7	FW	(Senegal)	22	Pape Sané	1	0	0	1
				TOTALS	35	3	2	40
