= Yann Karamoh =

French footballer (born 1998)

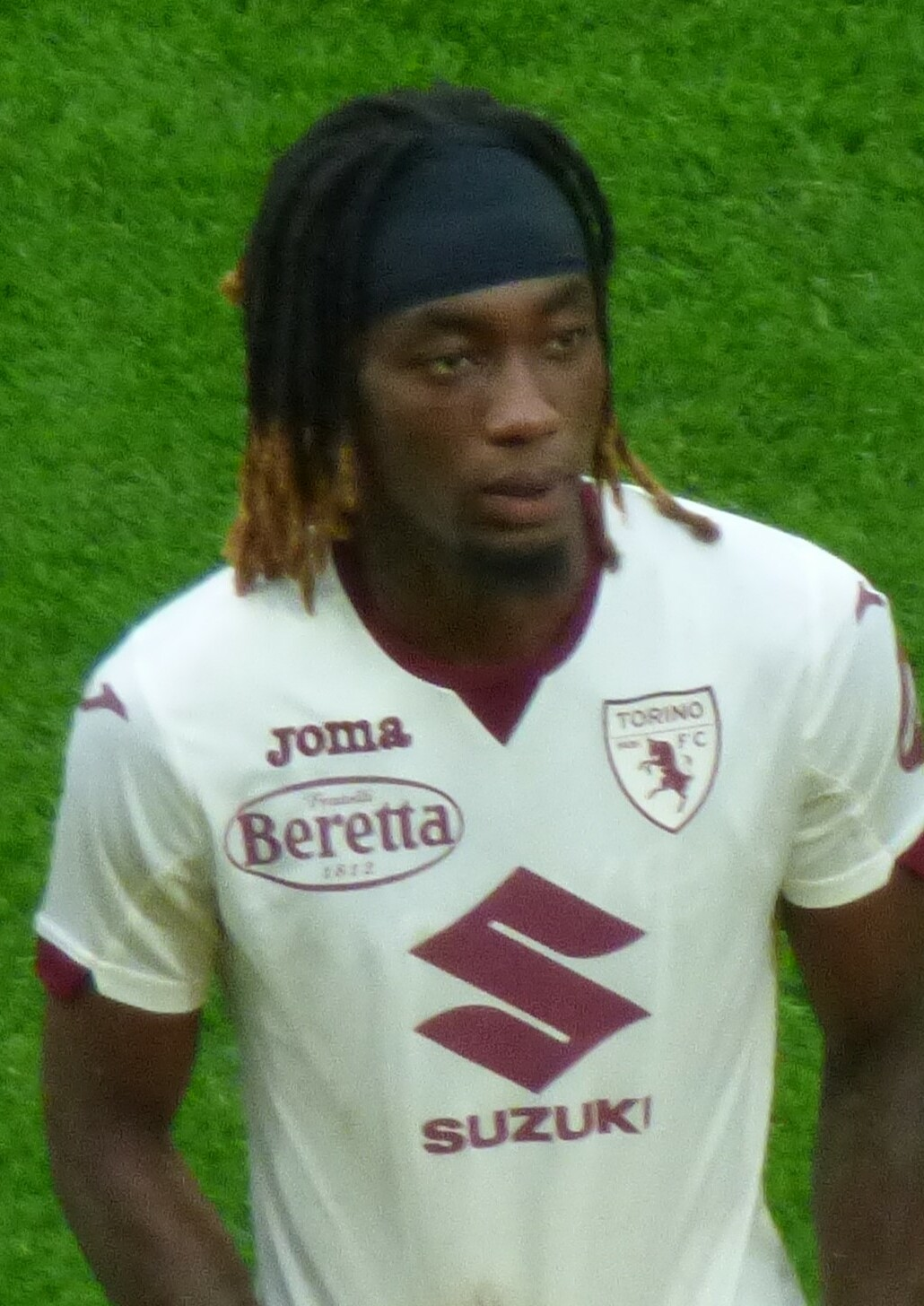
- Karamoh with Torino in 2023

Personal information
- Full name: Yann Dorgelès Isaac Karamoh
- Date of birth: 8 July 1998 (age 28)
- Place of birth: Abidjan, Ivory Coast
- Height: 1.85 m (6 ft 1 in)
- Positions: Forward; winger

Team information
- Current team: Sampdoria
- Number: 14

Youth career
- 2006–2011: Racing Club de France
- 2011–2016: Caen

Senior career*
Years	Team	Apps	(Gls)
2015–2016	Caen B	28	(11)
2016–2017	Caen	35	(5)
2017–2020	Inter Milan	17	(1)
2018–2019	→ Bordeaux (loan)	22	(3)
2019–2020	→ Parma (loan)	14	(1)
2020–2022	Parma	24	(2)
2021–2022	→ Fatih Karagümrük (loan)	32	(4)
2022–2025	Torino	60	(4)
2024	→ Montpellier (loan)	12	(1)
2025–2026	Porto B	8	(2)
2025–2026	Porto	1	(0)
2026–	Sampdoria	1	(0)

International career
2014	France U16	8	(3)
2014–2015	France U17	5	(1)
2016	France U18	1	(1)
2016	France U19	5	(1)
2017–2018	France U20	3	(1)
2017–2018	France U21	4	(1)
- * Club domestic league appearances and goals as of 13 September 2026

Yann Dorgelès Isaac Karamoh (born 8 July 1998) is a professional footballer who plays as a forward or right winger for Serie B club Sampdoria. Born in the Ivory Coast, he is a former youth international for France.

== Club career ==
=== Caen ===
Born in Abidjan, Karamoh joined Caen in 2011 from Racing Colombes 92. On 7 December 2015, he signed his first professional contract, with a duration of three years.

He made his debut in Ligue 1 on 13 August 2016 in Caen's 3–2 win against Lorient, replacing Ronny Rodelin in the 77th minute. Six days later, he started and played the full 90 minutes in his club's second league match of the season, a 0–2 defeat away to Lyon.

=== Inter Milan ===
On 31 August 2017, Karamoh joined Serie A club Inter Milan on a two-year loan deal with the obligation to purchase. He made his Serie A debut 24 September 2017 in 1–0 win over Genoa replacing Borja Valero in the 72nd minute. On 11 February 2018, he started in his first league match and scored the winning goal to give Inter a 2–1 win against Bologna.

==== Loan to Bordeaux ====
On 31 August 2018, Karamoh returned to France moving to Bordeaux for a season-year loan.

=== Parma ===
On 17 July 2019, Karamoh joined Parma on loan for one year with an obligation to make deal permanent.

=== Torino ===
On 1 September 2022, Karamoh signed a one-season contract with Torino, with an option to extend for two more seasons.

==== Loan to Montpellier ====
On 1 February 2024, Karamoh joined Montpellier on loan with an option to buy.

=== Porto ===
On 18 September 2025, Karamoh joined Primeira Liga club FC Porto on a free transfer, signing a contract until the end of the season. After playing for the B-team in order to gain match fitness, he made his debut for the main team on 27 October, coming off the bench in the 83rd minute of a 2–1 league win away at Moreirense.

=== Sampdoria ===
On 5 September 2026, Karamoh joined Sampdoria on a free contract until the end of the season (30 June 2027) with an option to extend such contract until 30 June 2028 under certain conditions.

== Career statistics ==
As of match played 11 January 2026

Appearances and goals by club, season and competition
Club	Season	League			National cup (Note: Includes Coupe de France, Coppa Italia, Turkish Cup)		League cup (Note: Includes Taça da Liga)		Continental		Other		Total	
Club	Season	Division	Apps	Goals	Apps	Goals	Apps	Goals	Apps	Goals	Apps	Goals	Apps	Goals
Caen B	2014–15	CFA 2	10	4	—		—		—		—		10	4
Caen B	2015–16	CFA 2	18	7	—		—		—		—		18	7
Caen B	Total		28	11	—		—		—		—		28	11
Caen	2016–17	Ligue 1	35	5	1	0	—		0	0	—		36	5
Inter Milan	2017–18	Serie A	16	1	1	0	—		—		—		17	1
Inter Milan	2018–19	Serie A	1	0	0	0	—		—		0	0	1	0
Inter Milan	Total		17	1	1	0	—		—		0	0	18	1
Bordeaux (loan)	2018–19	Ligue 1	22	3	4	0	—		6 (Note: Appearances in UEFA Europa League)	0	—		32	3
Parma (loan)	2019–20	Serie A	14	1	1	0	—		—		—		15	1
Parma	2020–21	Serie A	24	2	2	2	—		—		—		26	4
Fatih Karagümrük (loan)	2021–22	Süper Lig	32	4	3	0	—		—		—		35	4
Torino	2022–23	Serie A	21	4	2	1	—		—		—		23	5
Torino	2023–24	Serie A	10	0	1	0	—		—		—		11	0
Torino	2024–25	Serie A	29	0	2	0	—		—		—		31	0
Torino	Total		60	4	5	1	—		—		—		65	5
Montpellier (loan)	2023–24	Ligue 1	12	1	1	0	—		—		—		13	1
Porto B	2025–26	Liga Portugal 2	8	2	—		—		—		—		8	2
Porto	2025–26	Primeira Liga	1	0	0	0	1	0	0	0	—		2	0
Career total			253	34	18	3	1	0	6	0	0	0	278	37

== Honours ==
Porto

- Primeira Liga: 2025–26
