= Samuele Ricci =

Italian footballer (born 2001)

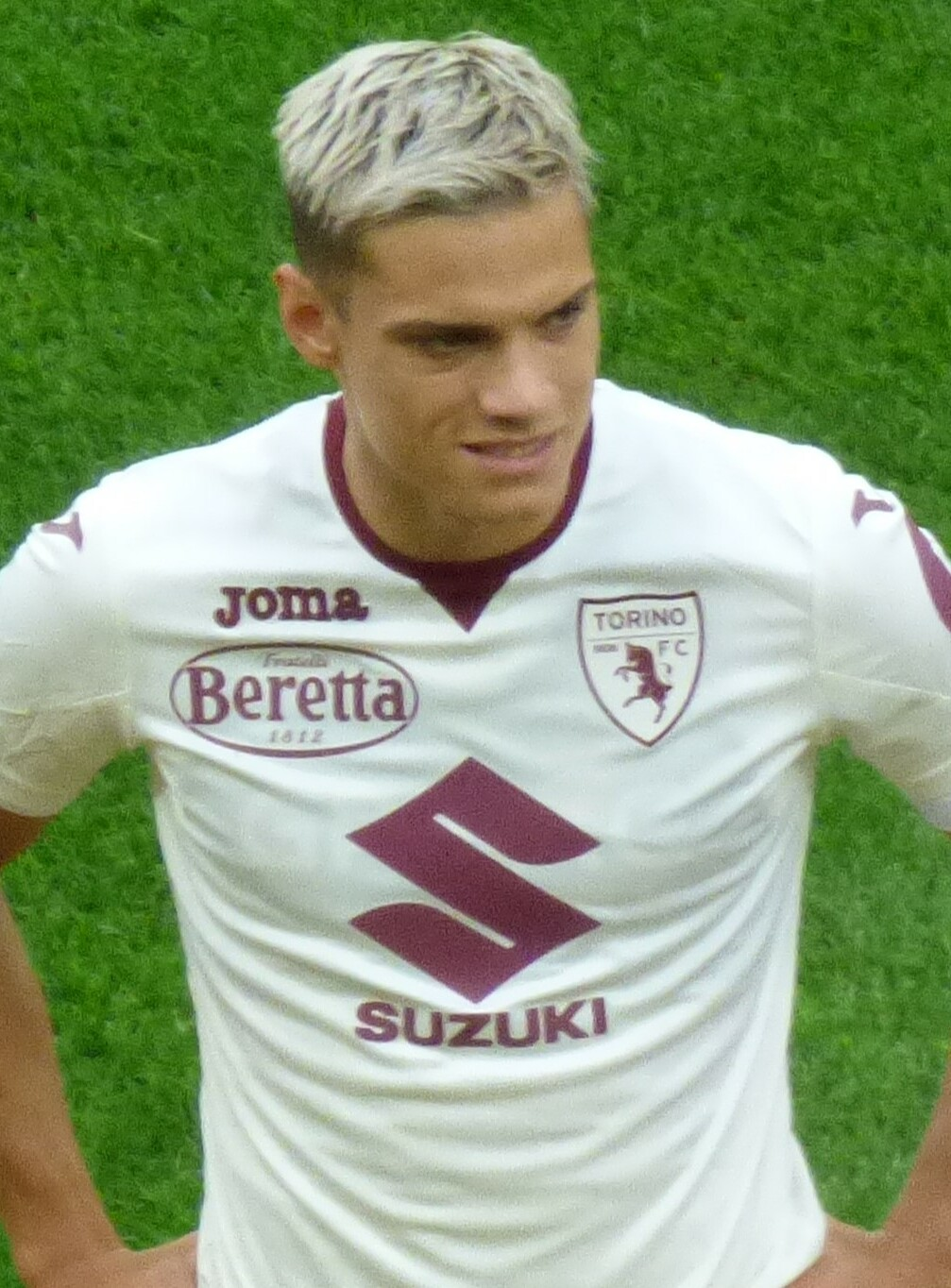
- Ricci with Torino in 2023

Personal information
- Date of birth: 21 August 2001 (age 25)
- Place of birth: Pontedera, Italy
- Height: 1.81 m (5 ft 11 in)
- Position: Defensive midfielder

Team information
- Current team: Como (on loan from AC Milan)
- Number: 21

Youth career
- 2011–2019: Empoli

Senior career*
Years	Team	Apps	(Gls)
2019–2022	Empoli	83	(3)
2022	→ Torino (loan)	12	(0)
2022–2025	Torino	94	(4)
2025–	AC Milan	31	(1)
2026–	→ Como (loan)	9	(0)

International career^{‡}
2017–2018	Italy U17	12	(3)
2018–2019	Italy U18	6	(1)
2019–2020	Italy U19	11	(0)
2020–2023	Italy U21	17	(1)
2022–	Italy	12	(0)
Medal record
Representing Italy
UEFA European Under-17 Championship
Runner-up	England 2018	U-17 Team
- * Club domestic league appearances and goals as of 12:12, 21 November 2026 (UTC) ‡ National team caps and goals as of 12 November 2026

Samuele Ricci (Italian pronunciation: [samuˈɛːle ˈrittʃi]; born 21 August 2001) is an Italian professional footballer who plays as a defensive midfielder for Serie A club Como, on loan from AC Milan, and the Italy national team.

== Club career ==
=== Empoli ===
Ricci came through the Empoli youth teams and started playing for their under-19 squad in the 2018–19 season. He was called up to the senior squad for the first time in April 2019, but remained on the bench on that occasion. Ricci made his professional debut for Empoli on 21 September 2019, at the age of 18, replacing Leo Štulac in a 1–0 win against Cittadella. The following season, coach Alessio Dionisi mainly used him as a mezzala. On 18 January 2021, RIcci scored his first goal as a professional in the 5–0 victory against Salernitana. Empoli finished the season in first place in the league standing and were promoted to Serie A, with Ricci winning the Manlio Scopigno award as the best player of the season.

=== Torino ===
On 30 January 2022, Ricci was loaned to Torino with a conditional obligation to purchase. On 28 January 2023, he scored his first goal for Torino in a 2–2 draw away against former club Empoli.

=== AC Milan ===
On 3 July 2025, Ricci completed his transfer to AC Milan from Torino for a fee of €23 million + €1.5 million in bonuses. He signed a contract until 30 June 2029, with an option in the club's favour for an extension until 30 June 2030, and chose to wear the shirt number 4. Before his transfer eventually happened, he had already been linked with the move to Milan since April 2020, his debut season in senior football, with the club's numerous offers to sign the player turned down by both Empoli and Torino.

==== Loan to Como ====
On 29 August 2026, Ricci moved to fellow Serie A club Como, on loan for the 2026–27 season, for an estimated €2 million fee and the option to make the move permanent at the end of the season.

== International career ==
Ricci was first called up to the Italy under-17 team in December 2017 for a friendly against France.

Ricci was selected in the senior Italy squad for the 2022 Finalissima against Argentina on 1 June 2022 – as well as 2022–23 UEFA Nations League group stage matches against Germany (twice), Hungary, England – between 4 and 14 June 2022. He debuted against Germany in the latter tournament on 4 June.

== Style of play ==
Ricci is a right-footed player, mainly deployed as a playmaker in front of the defence or as a box-to-box midfielder, also known as a mezzala in his native Italy. Gifted with excellent individual technique and sense of positioning, he is regarded as one of the most important prospects in Italian football. His reference model is Andrea Pirlo.

== Personal life ==
On 9 September 2020, Ricci tested positive for COVID-19.

== Career statistics ==
=== Club ===
As of match played 21 November 2026

Appearances and goals by club, season and competition
Club	Season	League			Coppa Italia		Other		Total	
Club	Season	Division	Apps	Goals	Apps	Goals	Apps	Goals	Apps	Goals
Empoli	2019–20	Serie B	29	0	1	0	—		30	0
Empoli	2020–21	Serie B	33	2	3	0	—		36	2
Empoli	2021–22	Serie A	21	1	3	0	—		24	1
Empoli	Total		83	3	7	0	—		90	3
Torino (loan)	2021–22	Serie A	12	0	—		—		12	0
Torino	2022–23	Serie A	28	2	4	0	—		32	2
Torino	2023–24	Serie A	32	1	1	0	—		33	1
Torino	2024–25	Serie A	34	1	2	0	—		36	1
Torino	Torino total		106	4	7	0	—		113	4
AC Milan	2025–26	Serie A	31	1	3	0	0	0	34	1
Como (loan)	2026–27	Serie A	9	0	0	0	3 (Note: Appearances in UEFA Champions League)	0	12	0
Career total			229	8	17	0	3	0	249	8

=== International ===
As of match played 12 November 2026

Appearances and goals by national team and year
National team	Year	Apps	Goals
Italy	2022	2	0
Italy	2023	0	0
Italy	2024	4	0
Italy	2025	5	0
Italy	2026	1	0
Total		12	0

== Honours ==
Empoli

- Serie B: 2020–21

Individual

- Serie B Footballer of the Year: 2020–21
