= Adam Masina =

Moroccan football player (born 1994)

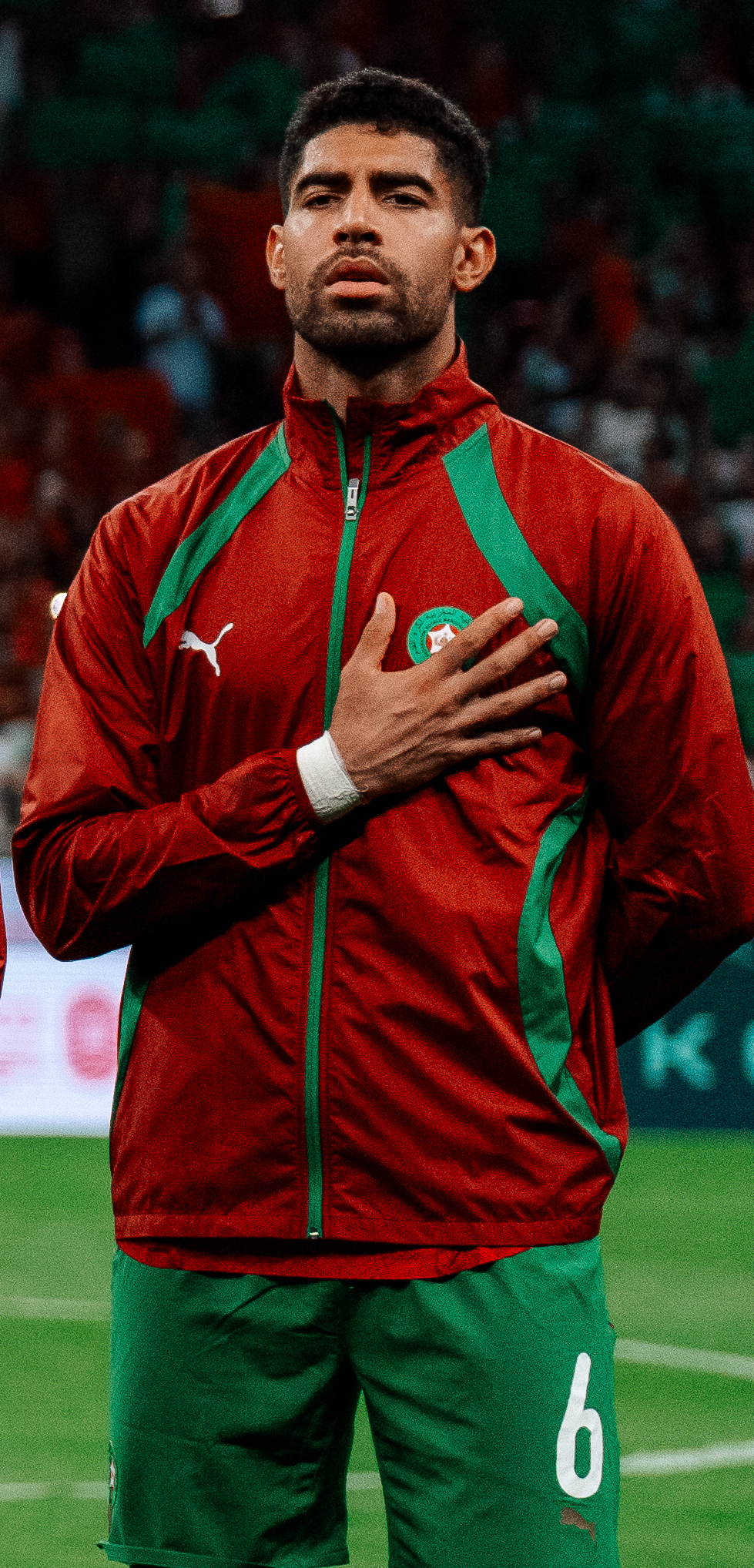
- Masina with Morocco in 2025

Personal information
- Full name: Adam Masina
- Date of birth: 2 January 1994 (age 32)
- Place of birth: Khouribga, Morocco
- Height: 1.89 m (6 ft 2 in)
- Position: Centre-back

Youth career
- 2001–2014: Bologna
- 2011–2012: → Giacomense (loan)

Senior career*
Years	Team	Apps	(Gls)
2012–2018	Bologna	131	(4)
2012–2013	→ Giacomense (loan)	11	(0)
2018–2022	Watford	90	(3)
2022–2024	Udinese	18	(2)
2024	→ Torino (loan)	16	(0)
2024–2026	Torino	33	(1)
Total		299	(9)

International career
2015–2017	Italy U21	6	(0)
2021–2026	Morocco	28	(0)
Medal record
Men's football
Representing Morocco
Africa Cup of Nations
Winner	2025 Morocco
- * Club domestic league appearances and goals

Adam Masina (Arabic: أدم ماسينا; born 2 January 1994) is a Moroccan former professional footballer who played as a centre-back.

Coming through Bologna's youth academy, Masina made his senior debut for the club in 2012. That same year, he moved on loan to Giacomense. In 2018, he transferred to English club Watford, where he won promotion to the Premier League with the club in the 2020–21 season. After four years with the Hornets, he returned to Italy, signing with Udinese. After playing sporadically for the club, he joined Torino on loan in January 2024, signing permanently with Torino in the summer of that year.

Masina was born in Morocco but moved to Italy at a young age. He initially represented Italy at an international level of under-21, before switching to play for the Morocco national team in 2021.

== Club career ==
Masina was born in Khouribga, Morocco, and his mother died when Masina was an infant. He successively moved to Italy together with his brother and father, settling down in Emilia-Romagna, and was later assigned to a number of foster families due to his father's problems with alcoholism. He was eventually adopted by one of them, from which he took his last name. In interviews conducted in 2015, he identified himself as a Catholic Christian.

After a successful loan in Giacomense, Masina returned to Bologna in 2013 and made his senior debut for the Rossoblu in a 2–1 away victory over Latina on 12 October 2014. He helped the club obtain Serie A promotion, later debuting in the top division, and scoring his first goal in Serie A in an injury time victory at Carpi.

On 2 July 2018, Masina signed for English club Watford on a five-year contract for an undisclosed fee.

On 18 July 2022, Masina signed a three-year contract with Italian club Udinese.

On 1 February 2024, he moved on loan to Torino, with an option to buy. On 14 June, Torino announced that they had activated their option to buy, Masina signing a two-year contract.

On 2 February 2026, Masina's contract with Torino was terminated by mutual consent.

== International career ==
In November 2015, Luigi Di Biagio called Masina to represent Italy U21 team after obtaining FIFA transfer. He debuted with the Italy U21 side on 17 November 2015, in a Euro 2017 qualification match against Lithuania.

In March 2021, Masina was called up to represent Morocco in African Cup of Nations qualifier matches against Mauritania and Burundi, debuting on 26 March 2021 against the former.

On 11 December 2025, Masina was called up to the Morocco squad for the 2025 Africa Cup of Nations.

== Style of play ==
Masina had been known in particular for his technique, physicality and energy, primarily as a left-back.

== Career statistics ==
=== Club ===
Appearances and goals by club, season and competition
Club	Season	League			National cup		League cup		Other		Total	
Club	Season	Division	Apps	Goals	Apps	Goals	Apps	Goals	Apps	Goals	Apps	Goals
Giacomense (loan)	2012–13	Lega Pro Seconda Divisione	11	0	0	0	—		0	0	11	0
Bologna	2013–14	Serie A	0	0	0	0	—		0	0	0	0
Bologna	2014–15	Serie B	28	1	0	0	—		0	0	28	1
Bologna	2015–16	Serie A	33	2	1	0	—		0	0	34	2
Bologna	2016–17	Serie A	32	1	2	0	—		0	0	34	1
Bologna	2017–18	Serie A	34	0	1	0	—		0	0	35	0
Bologna	Total		127	4	4	0	—		0	0	131	4
Watford	2018–19	Premier League	14	0	4	0	2	0	—		20	0
Watford	2019–20	Premier League	26	1	1	0	1	0	—		28	1
Watford	2020–21	Championship	25	2	1	0	0	0	—		26	2
Watford	2021–22	Premier League	15	0	0	0	1	0	—		16	0
Watford	Total		80	3	6	0	4	0	0	0	90	3
Udinese	2022–23	Serie A	12	2	1	0	—		—		13	2
Udinese	2023–24	Serie A	4	0	1	0	—		—		5	0
Udinese	Total		16	2	2	0	0	0	0	0	18	2
Torino (loan)	2023–24	Serie A	16	0	0	0	—		—		16	0
Torino	2024–25	Serie A	28	1	1	0	—		—		29	1
Torino	2025–26	Serie A	5	0	1	0	—		—		6	0
Torino	Total		49	1	2	0	0	0	0	0	51	1
Career total			283	10	14	0	4	0	0	0	301	10

== Honours ==
Watford

- FA Cup runner-up: 2018–19

Morocco

- Africa Cup of Nations runner-up: 2025

Individual

- Serie B Footballer of the Year: 2015
- EFL Championship Team of the Season: 2020–21
