= Ivan Santini =

Croatian footballer (born 1989)

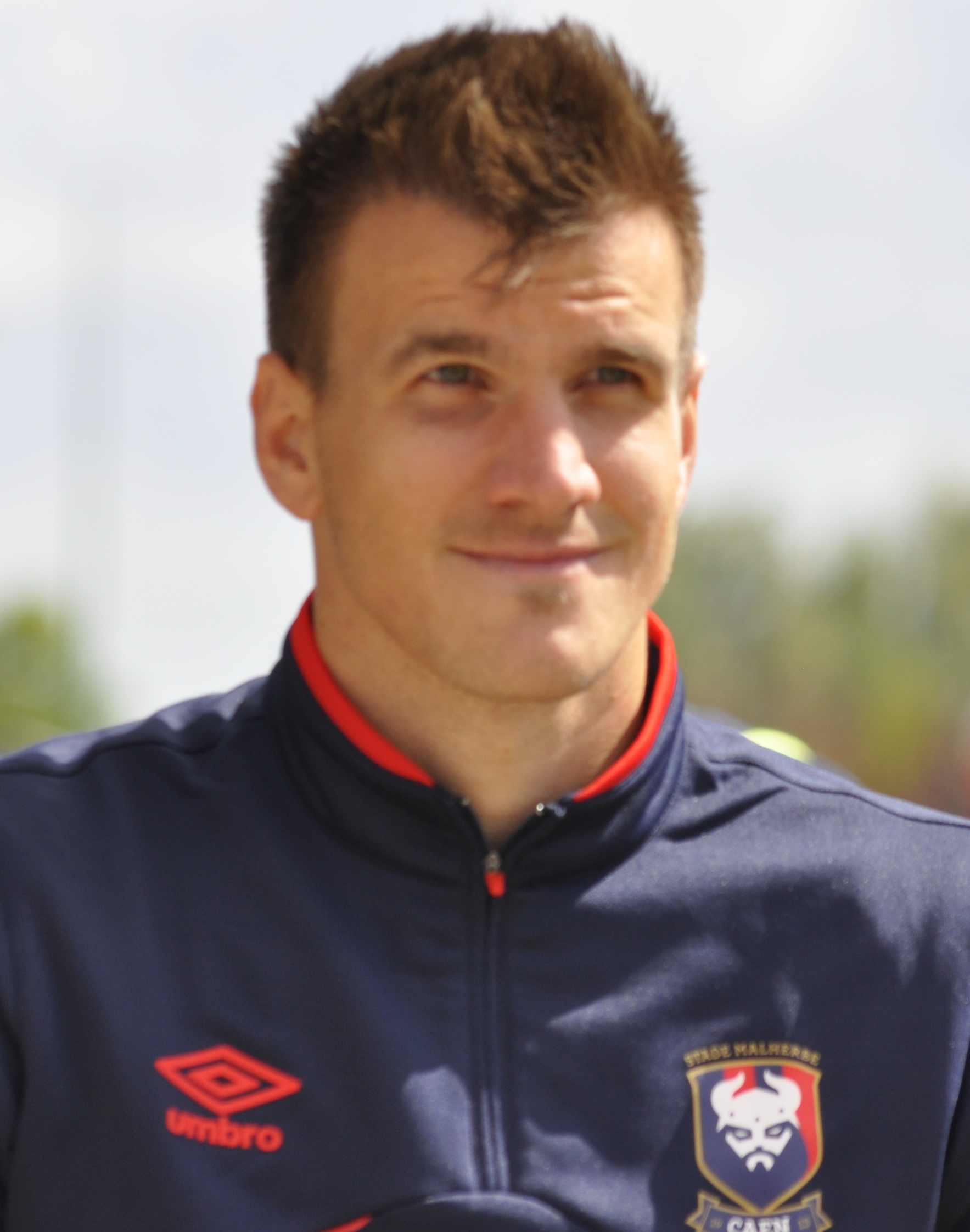
- Santini with Caen in 2016

Personal information
- Date of birth: 21 May 1989 (age 37)
- Place of birth: Zadar, SR Croatia, Yugoslavia
- Height: 1.90 m (6 ft 3 in)
- Position: Forward

Team information
- Current team: HNK Zadar
- Number: 19

Youth career
- 2003–2006: Zadar
- 2006–2007: Inter Zaprešić
- 2007–2008: Red Bull Salzburg

Senior career*
Years	Team	Apps	(Gls)
2006–2007	Inter Zaprešić	4	(1)
2009	Ingolstadt 04	6	(0)
2009–2013	Zadar	64	(26)
2012–2013	→ SC Freiburg (loan)	24	(1)
2013–2015	Kortrijk	69	(30)
2015–2016	Standard Liège	28	(12)
2016–2018	Caen	66	(26)
2018–2019	Anderlecht	34	(16)
2019–2020	Jiangsu Suning	30	(12)
2021	Osijek	12	(3)
2021–2022	Al-Fateh	23	(6)
2022–2024	Zürich	32	(0)
2024–2025	Šibenik	32	(7)
2025–	HNK Zadar	31	(18)

International career^{‡}
2007	Croatia U18	2	(0)
2007	Croatia U19	2	(1)
2017–2018	Croatia	5	(0)
- * Club domestic league appearances and goals as of 14 August 2026 ‡ National team caps and goals as of 15 October 2018

Ivan Santini (Croatian pronunciation: [ǐʋan santîːni]; born 21 May 1989) is a Croatian professional footballer who plays as a forward for Croatian club HNK Zadar.

== Club career ==
Ivan Santini, born in Zadar, played for his hometown side's youth team, until the summer of 2006, when he moved to Inter Zaprešić where he signed his first professional contract and made four first team appearances, scoring his first professional goal in the process. The next season, he moved to Red Bull Salzburg where he spent the duration of the year as a youth player.

He made his debut on the professional league level in the 2. Bundesliga for FC Ingolstadt on 8 March 2009, when he came on as a substitute in the 72nd minute in a game against 1860 Munich and scored his first goal. From 2009 to 2012, he played for Zadar. On 31 January 2012, Santini joined SC Freiburg on a six-month loan move with a clause in which Freiburg could buy out his contract.

In June 2013, he signed a contract to join Kortrijk.

On 18 June 2015, Santini moved to Standard Liège on a four-year contract, for a fee of €2 million. In the final of the Belgian Cup in 2016, Santini scored a goal in the 88th minute of the match to secure a dramatic 2–1 win over Club Brugge.

On 3 August 2016, Santini moved to Caen on a three-year contract, for a fee estimated over €2 million. In January 2017, he became the second Croatian player after Dado Pršo to score at least ten goals in Ligue 1.

=== Anderlecht ===
On 3 July 2018, he moved to Anderlecht on a three-year contract for €3 million fee. He debuted on 13 July 2018 in a friendly match against Ajax and scored two goals. In his official debut, on 28 July 2018, he scored a hat-trick against his former club Kortrijk.

On 5 August 2018, he scored his second hat-trick of the season against Oostende. On 12 August 2018, he scored the second goal in a 2–1 win against Charleroi. He finished the 2018–19 season as the club's top scorer with 16 league goals.

=== Jiangsu Suning ===
On 29 July 2019, Santini joined Chinese Super League club Jiangsu Suning, becoming their fifth and final allotted foreign born player for the season. On 24 October 2020, Santini's ninth-minute strike against Chongqing Lifan secured Jiangsu Suning a place in the semi-finals of the 2020 Chinese Super League play-offs against 2018 title winners Shanghai SIPG. Santini was a substitute in the second-leg of the CSL final against Guangzhou Evergrande on 12 November, coming on in the 80th minute for goalscorer Éder. The club held on to a 2–1 win which confirmed Jiangsu Suning as league champions for the first time in their history.

=== NK Osijek ===
On 13 February 2021, Santini returned to Croatia to sign with Prva HNL side NK Osijek. He scored the winning goal on his debut for the club against Varaždin on 26 February.

=== Al-Fateh ===
On 10 August 2021, Santini joined Saudi Arabian club Al-Fateh.

=== Zürich ===
On 29 June 2022, he joined Swiss side Zürich.

== International career ==
Santini made his debut for Croatia in a May 2017 friendly match against Mexico and earned a total of five caps, scoring no goals. In May 2018, he was shortlisted on Croatia's preliminary 32-man squad for the 2018 World Cup in Russia, but did not make the final 23.

His final international was an October 2018 friendly against Jordan.

== Personal life ==
His brother Krševan plays as a goalkeeper. Their father is the late singer Romeo Santini.

== Career statistics ==
=== Club ===
As of match played 3 September 2023

Appearances and goals by club, season and competition
Club	Season	League			National cup (Note: Includes Croatian Cup, DFB-Pokal, Belgian Cup, Coupe de France, Chinese FA Cup, King Cup, Swiss Cup)		League cup (Note: Includes Coupe de la Ligue)		Continental		Total	
Club	Season	Division	Apps	Goals	Apps	Goals	Apps	Goals	Apps	Goals	Apps	Goals
Inter Zaprešić	2006–07	Druga HNL	4	1			–		–		4	1
Ingolstadt	2008–09	2. Bundesliga	6	0	–		–		–		6	0
NK Zadar	2009–10	1. HNL	19	6	0	0	–		–		19	6
NK Zadar	2010–11	1. HNL	29	10	0	0	–		–		29	10
NK Zadar	2011–12	1. HNL	16	10	0	0	–		–		16	10
NK Zadar	Total		64	26	0	0	–		–		64	26
SC Freiburg (loan)	2011–12	Bundesliga	10	0	0	0	–		–		10	0
SC Freiburg (loan)	2012–13	Bundesliga	14	1	3	1	–		–		17	2
SC Freiburg (loan)	Total		24	1	3	1	–		–		27	2
Kortrijk	2013–14	Belgian Pro League	36	15	3	2	–		–		39	17
Kortrijk	2014–15	Belgian Pro League	33	15	2	1	–		–		35	16
Kortrijk	Total		69	30	5	3	–		–		74	33
Standard Liège	2015–16	Belgian Pro League	27	11	5	1	–		4 (Note: Appearances in UEFA Europa League)	1	36	13
Standard Liège	2016–17	Belgian Pro League	1	1	1	1	–		0	0	2	2
Standard Liège	Total		28	12	6	2	–		4	1	38	15
Caen	2016–17	Ligue 1	34	15	2	1	0	0	–		36	16
Caen	2017–18	Ligue 1	31	11	5	0	2	0	–		38	11
Caen	Total		65	26	7	1	2	0	–		74	27
Anderlecht	2018–19	Belgian Pro League	34	16	1	0	–		4	0	39	16
Jiangsu Suning	2019	Chinese Super League	10	6	0	0	–		–		10	6
Jiangsu Suning	2020	Chinese Super League	20	6	1	1	–		–		21	7
Jiangsu Suning	Total		30	12	1	1	–		–		31	13
NK Osijek	2020–21	1. HNL	12	3	1	0	–		–		13	3
Al Fateh	2021–22	Saudi Pro League	23	6	1	0	–		–		24	6
Zürich	2022–23	Swiss Super League	11	0	1	0	–		5 (Note: One appearance and one goal in UEFA Champions League, four appearances and one goal in UEFA Europa League)	2	17	2
Zürich	2023–24	Swiss Super League	3	0	1	2	–		–		4	2
Zürich	Total		14	0	2	2	–		5	2	21	4
Career total			373	133	26	10	2	0	13	3	415	146

== Honours ==
Inter Zaprešić

- Druga HNL: 2006–07

Standard Liege

- Belgian Cup: 2015–16

Jiangsu Suning

- Chinese Super League: 2020

Individual

- Prva HNL Player of the Year: 2010–11
