= Saba Sazonov =

Footballer (born 2002)

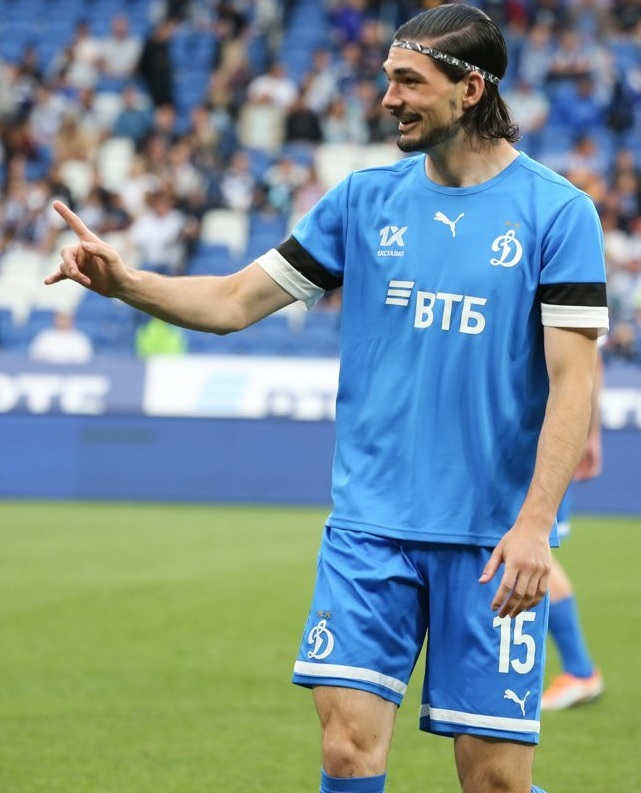
- Sazonov with Dynamo Moscow in 2022

Personal information
- Full name: Saba Andreyevich Sazonov
- Date of birth: 1 February 2002 (age 24)
- Place of birth: Saint Petersburg, Russia
- Height: 1.94 m (6 ft 4 in)
- Position: Centre-back

Team information
- Current team: Getafe
- Number: 4

Youth career
- 2008–2020: Zenit Saint Petersburg

Senior career*
Years	Team	Apps	(Gls)
2019–2021	Zenit-2 Saint Petersburg	24	(3)
2021	Zenit Saint Petersburg	1	(0)
2021–2023	Dynamo Moscow	34	(1)
2021–2022	→ Dynamo-2 Moscow	9	(2)
2023–2026	Torino	13	(0)
2024–2025	→ Empoli (loan)	0	(0)
2026–	Getafe	0	(0)

International career^{‡}
2022–2025	Georgia U21	12	(2)
2022–	Georgia	4	(0)
- * Club domestic league appearances and goals as of 31 August 2025 ‡ National team caps and goals as of 6 October 2026

Saba Andreyevich Sazonov (Georgian: საბა საზონოვი, romanized: saba sazonovi; Russian: Саба Андреевич Сазонов; born 1 February 2002) is a professional footballer who plays as a centre-back for La Liga club Getafe. Born in Russia, he plays for the Georgia national team internationally.

== Early life ==
His mother Nino Nishnianidze is a former professional Georgian volleyball player from Samtredia. She moved to Saint Petersburg where she met her Russian husband. During his childhood, Sazonov moved to Georgia and then back to Russia, to feel more comfortable with both countries' language and culture.

== Club career ==
Sazonov made his debut in the Russian Premier League for FC Zenit Saint Petersburg on 16 May 2021 in a game against FC Tambov. He was substituted on for Magomed Ozdoyev in the 76th minute.

In June 2021, he joined Dynamo Moscow on trial. On 9 July 2021, after impressing on trial, he signed a three-year contract with Dynamo.

On 31 August 2023, he signed for Serie A club Torino, becoming the third Georgian in the Serie A ahead the 2023–24 season.

Having taken part in 13 league matches for Torino, Sazonov signed a year-long loan contract with Empoli on 30 August 2024. Before he played any games for Empoli, he suffered an ACL tear in training, which eventually kept him out of play for the rest on the 2024–25 season.

On 4 August 2026, free agent Sazonov signed a one-year contract with La Liga club Getafe.

== International career ==
In September 2022, Sazonov was called up to the Georgia national under-21 football team. He was also called up to the Russian team for the same dates, but he chose to represent Georgia. Sazonov took part in all four games of the 2023 UEFA European Under-21 Championship, scoring a header in a 2–0 win over Portugal.

Sazonov debuted with the senior Georgia national team in a friendly 3–0 loss to Morocco on 17 November 2022.

== Career statistics ==
=== Club ===
As of matches played on 17 August 2024

Appearances and goals by club, season and competition
Club	Season	League			Cup		Continental		Other		Total	
Club	Season	Division	Apps	Goals	Apps	Goals	Apps	Goals	Apps	Goals	Apps	Goals
Zenit-2 St. Petersburg	2019–20	Russian Second League	6	0	–		–		–		6	0
Zenit-2 St. Petersburg	2020–21	Russian Second League	18	3	–		–		–		18	3
Zenit-2 St. Petersburg	Total		24	3	0	0	0	0	–		24	3
Zenit St. Petersburg	2020–21	Russian Premier League	1	0	0	0	0	0	–		1	0
Dynamo-2 Moscow	2021–22	Russian Second League	9	2	–		–		–		9	2
Dynamo Moscow	2021–22	Russian Premier League	6	0	0	0	–		–		6	0
Dynamo Moscow	2022–23	Russian Premier League	24	1	6	0	–		–		30	1
Dynamo Moscow	2023–24	Russian Premier League	4	0	1	0	–		–		5	0
Dynamo Moscow	Total		34	1	7	0	0	0	–		41	1
Torino	2023–24	Serie A	12	0	0	0	–		–		12	0
Torino	2024–25	Serie A	1	0	–		–		–		1	0
Torino	Total		13	0	0	0	0	0	–		13	0
Empoli (loan)	2024–25	Serie A	0	0	–		–		–		0	0
Career total			81	6	7	0	0	0	0	0	88	6

== Honours ==
Zenit Saint Petersburg

- Russian Premier League: 2020–21
