= Julien Féret =

French footballer (born 1982)

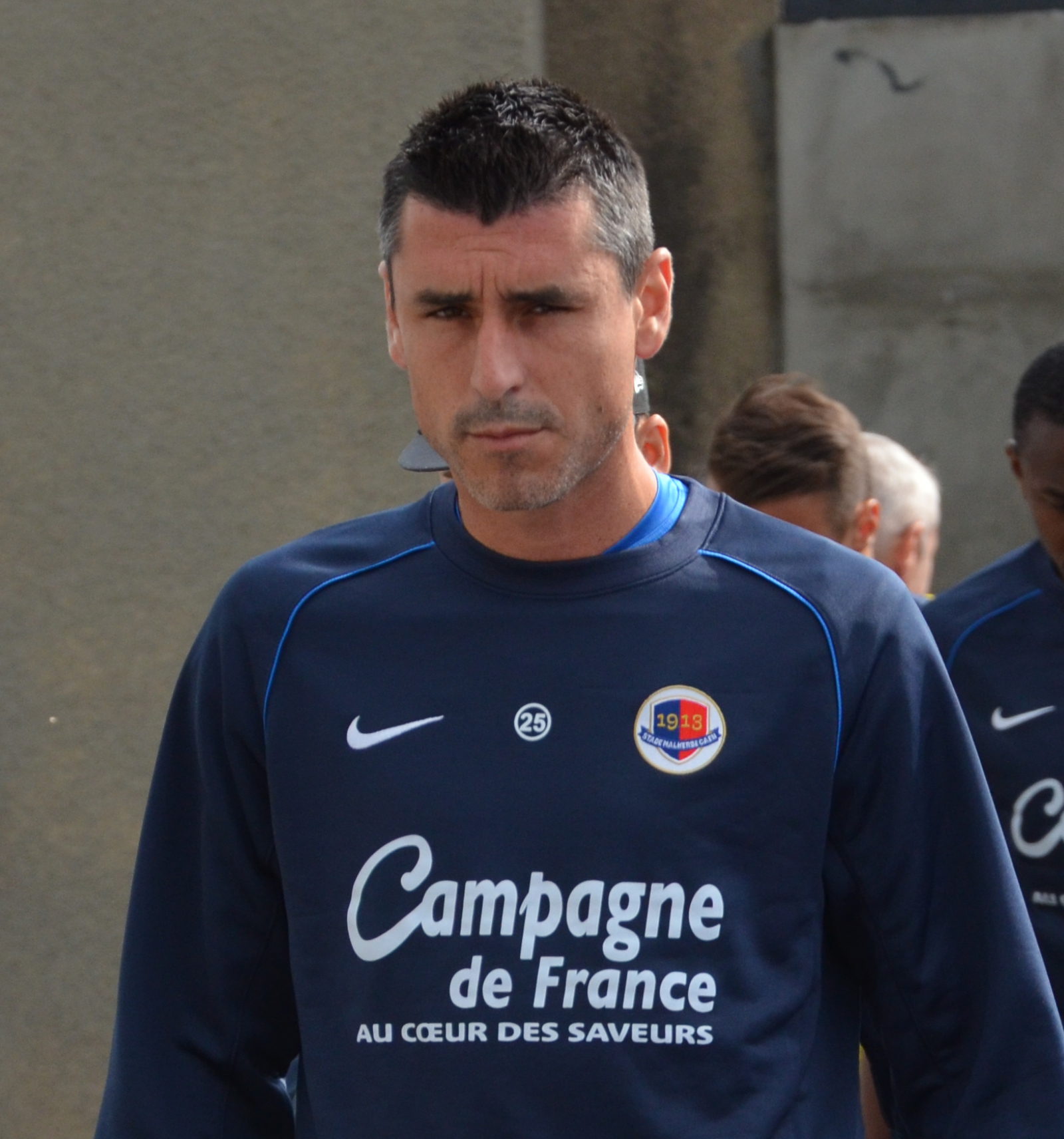
- Féret in 2014

Personal information
- Date of birth: 5 July 1982 (age 44)
- Place of birth: Saint-Brieuc, France
- Height: 1.87 m (6 ft 2 in)
- Position: Attacking midfielder

Youth career
- 2000–2003: Rennes

Senior career*
Years	Team	Apps	(Gls)
2003–2004	Cherbourg	24	(2)
2004–2005	Niort	31	(2)
2005–2008	Reims	95	(17)
2008–2011	Nancy	104	(15)
2011–2014	Rennes	88	(19)
2014–2018	Caen	147	(12)
2018–2019	Auxerre	32	(1)
Total		521	(68)

International career
2010	Brittany	1	(0)
- * Club domestic league appearances and goals

Julien Féret (born 5 July 1982) is a French former professional footballer who plays as an attacking midfielder. He was nominated for Goal of the Year by the UNFP after his goal against Evian on 28 November 2011. In May 2019, at the age of 36, Féret announced his retirement.
