= Ali Dembélé =

French footballer (born 2004)

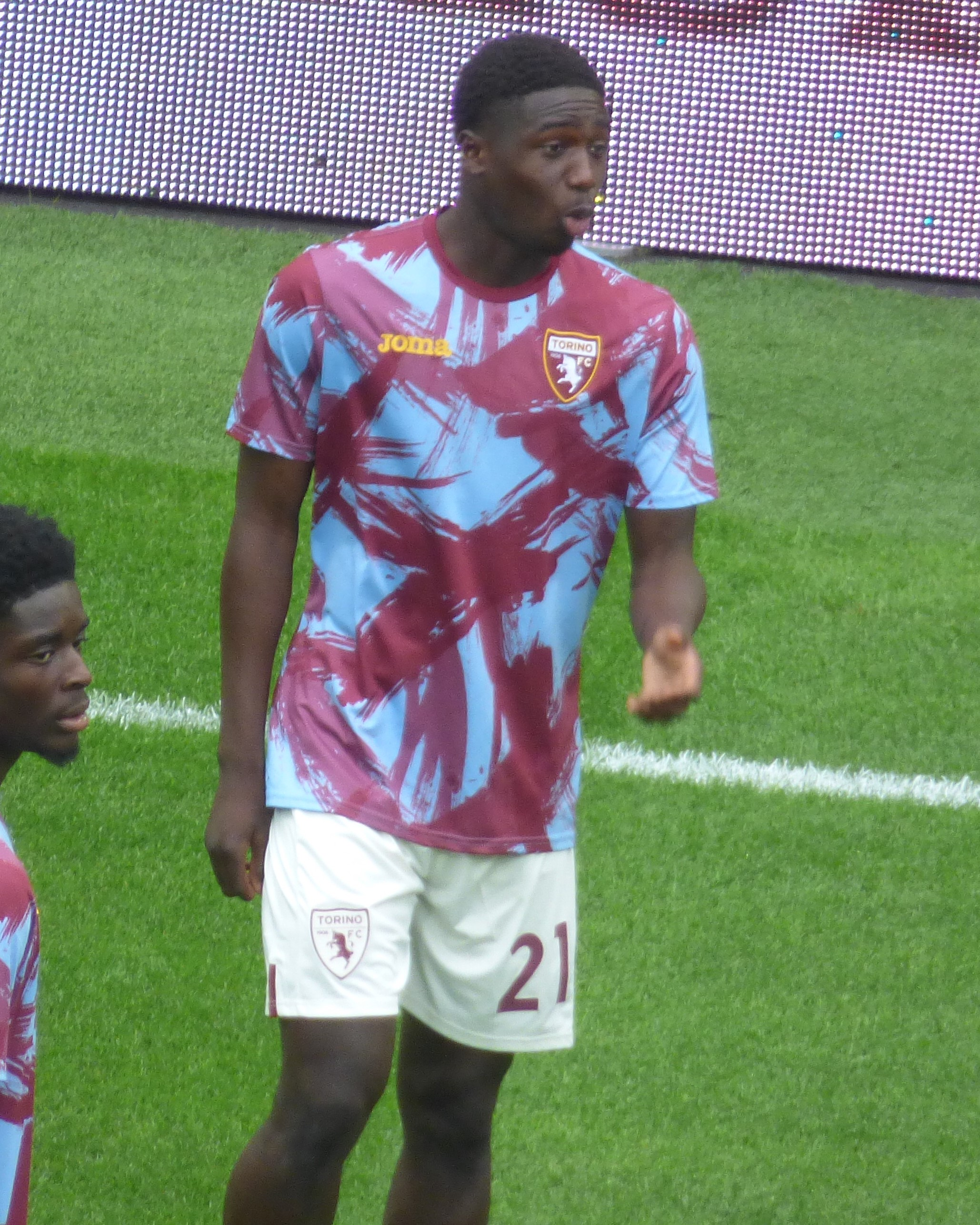

Personal information
- Full name: Ali Bina Dembélé
- Date of birth: 5 January 2004 (age 22)
- Place of birth: Villepinte, France
- Height: 1.89 m (6 ft 2 in)
- Positions: Right-back; right wing-back

Team information
- Current team: Lecce (on loan from Torino)
- Number: 2

Youth career
- 2010–2017: FC du Bourget
- 2017–2021: Troyes

Senior career*
Years	Team	Apps	(Gls)
2021–2022	Troyes II	3	(0)
2022–	Torino	17	(1)
2023–2024	→ Venezia (loan)	16	(1)
2026	→ Mantova (loan)	14	(0)
2026–	→ Lecce (loan)	0	(0)
- * Club domestic league appearances and goals as of 20 September 2026

Ali Bina Dembélé (born 5 January 2004) is a French professional footballer who plays as a right-back or right wing-back for Serie A club Lecce, on loan from Torino.

== Career ==
A youth product of FC du Bourget, Dembélé signed a youth contract with Troyes on 15 June 2017, and was promoted to their reserves in 2021.

=== Torino ===
In October 2022, Dembélé transferred to Torino where he played in their Primavera side. In the summer of 2023, he was promoted to the senior side and was part of their pre-season.

On 17 August 2024, Dembélé made his Serie A debut against AC Milan, replacing Raoul Bellanova in the 88th minute with Torino leading 2–0. Milan twice scored late to earn a draw.

==== Loan to Venezia ====
On 1 September 2023, Dembélé moved to Venezia on a season-long loan. He made his senior and professional debut with Venezia in a 4–3 Serie B win over Parma on 7 October.

==== Loan to Mantova ====
On 2 February 2026, Dembélé joined Mantova on loan.

==== Loan to Lecce ====
On 30 August 2026, Dembélé joined Lecce on a season-long loan with an option to buy for around €5 million.

== Personal life ==
Born in France, Dembélé is of Malian descent.
