= Raoul Bellanova =

Italian footballer (born 2000)

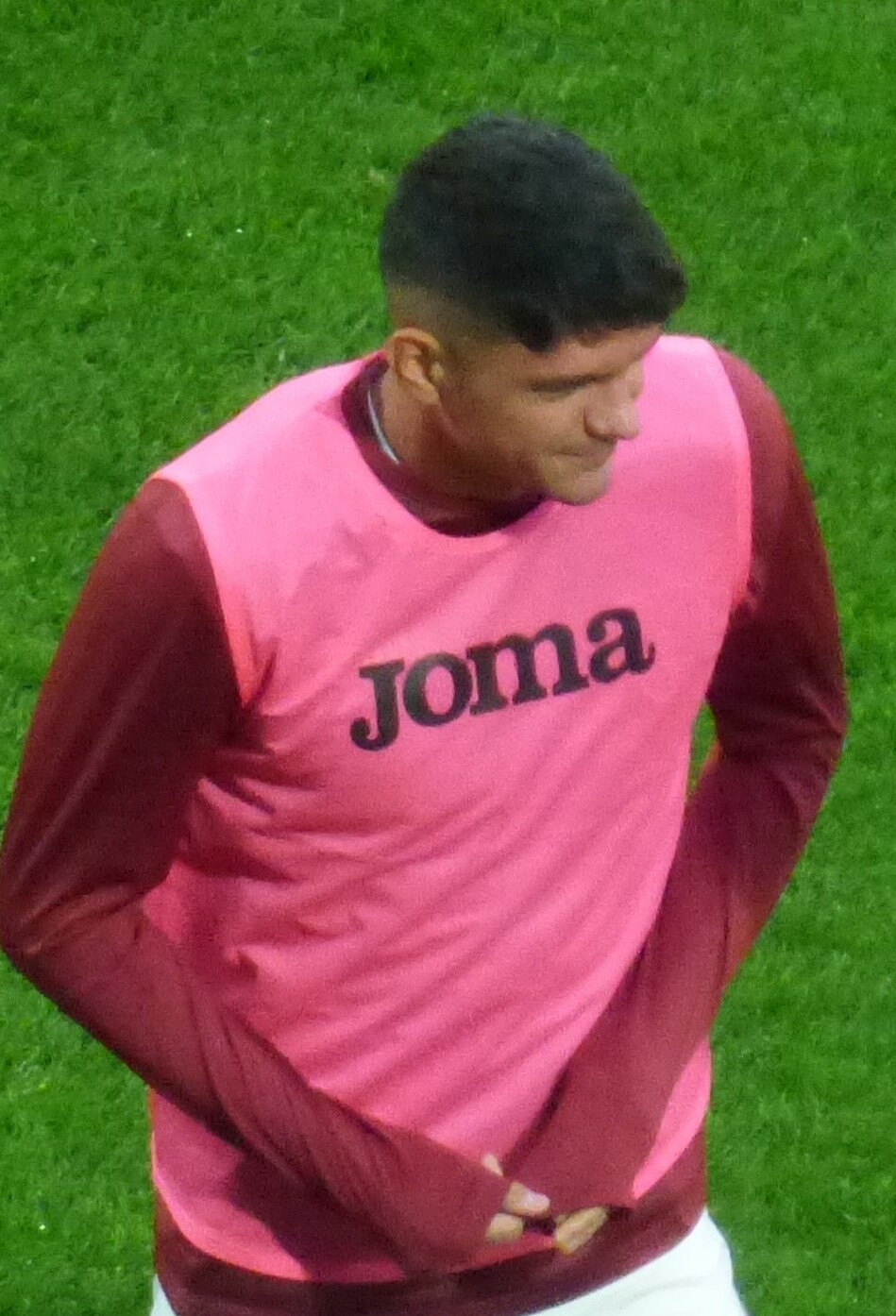
- Bellanova with Torino in 2023

Personal information
- Full name: Raoul Bellanova
- Date of birth: 17 May 2000 (age 26)
- Place of birth: Rho, Italy
- Height: 1.88 m (6 ft 2 in)
- Positions: Right-back; wing-back

Team information
- Current team: Atalanta
- Number: 16

Youth career
- 2006–2019: AC Milan

Senior career*
Years	Team	Apps	(Gls)
2019–2022	Bordeaux	1	(0)
2020	→ Atalanta (loan)	1	(0)
2020–2021	→ Pescara (loan)	30	(0)
2021–2022	→ Cagliari (loan)	31	(1)
2022–2023	Cagliari	0	(0)
2022–2023	→ Inter Milan (loan)	18	(0)
2023–2024	Torino	38	(1)
2024–	Atalanta	58	(0)

International career^{‡}
2015	Italy U15	9	(0)
2015	Italy U16	3	(0)
2015–2016	Italy U17	24	(0)
2017–2019	Italy U19	21	(0)
2018–2019	Italy U20	10	(0)
2020–2023	Italy U21	21	(0)
2024–2025	Italy	6	(0)
Medal record
Men's football
Representing Italy
UEFA European Under-19 Championship
Runner-up	2018 Finland
- * Club domestic league appearances and goals as of 23:10, 22 May 2026 (UTC) ‡ National team caps and goals as of 13 November 2025

Raoul Bellanova (born 17 May 2000) is an Italian professional footballer who plays as a right-back or wing-back for Serie A club Atalanta.

== Club career ==
=== Bordeaux ===
In July 2019, Bellanova was officially presented as a Bordeaux player. On 10 August 2019, he made his debut in senior football, starting in the opening match of the 2019–20 Ligue 1 season against Angers. Having made several positioning mistakes that led to three goals from his right flank, he was subbed off 63 minutes into the game by the team's coach Paulo Sousa.

==== Loan moves to Atalanta and Pescara ====
On 30 January 2020, Bellanova joined Atalanta on a 1.5-year loan with an option to purchase. He made his Serie A debut on 14 July in a 6–2 victory against Brescia.

On 24 September 2020, Atalanta loaned him to Serie B club Pescara.

=== Cagliari ===
On 31 August 2021, he joined Cagliari on loan with an option-to-buy. On 31 May 2022, Cagliari exercised their option to sign the player permanently.

==== Loan to Inter Milan ====
On 6 July 2022, Inter Milan announced the signing of Bellanova on loan from Cagliari for the 2022–23 season.

=== Torino ===
On 1 July 2023, Bellanova was signed by Torino for €8 million from Cagliari. He signed a four-year contract with the Granata and made his debut on 14 August, as a starter in a Coppa Italia match against Feralpisalò, won 2–1. The following Monday he made his league debut with Torino in the 0–0 draw against Cagliari. On 16 February 2024, he scored his first goal for Torino, opening the score in a 2–0 victory against Lecce. He also started the following season with Torino, playing one game in the Coppa Italia match and a 2–2 draw against Milan before being sold.

=== Return to Atalanta ===
On 22 August 2024, Bellanova was sold to Atalanta for a transfer fee of approximately €25 million including bonuses.

== International career ==
In October 2017, Bellanova represented Italy national under-19 football team in the UEFA European Under-19 Championship qualification. He debuted in a 4–0 victory against Moldova on 4 October. In November 2018, Bellanova played for Italy under-20 national team in a match against Germany.

On 24 March 2024, Bellanova debuted for the Italian senior squad in a friendly match against Ecuador. Later that year, on 6 June, he was selected in the Italian squad for the UEFA Euro 2024.

== Style of play ==
Bellanova is a physically strong, fast, offensive-minded right-back with the ability to read the game and good defensive positioning. Besides his regular position of a full-back or wing-back on the right flank, he can also play as a centre-back (in both, three and four-player defensive line) or as a wide midfielder in a 3–5–2 formation.

== Career statistics ==
=== Club ===
As of match played 22 May 2026

Appearances and goals by club, season and competition
Club	Season	League			National cup (Note: Includes Coupe de France, Coppa Italia)		Europe		Total	
Club	Season	Division	Apps	Goals	Apps	Goals	Apps	Goals	Apps	Goals
Bordeaux	2019–20	Ligue 1	1	0	0	0	—		1	0
Atalanta (loan)	2019–20	Serie A	1	0	0	0	0	0	1	0
Pescara (loan)	2020–21	Serie B	30	0	1	0	—		31	0
Cagliari (loan)	2021–22	Serie A	31	1	0	0	—		31	1
Inter Milan (loan)	2022–23	Serie A	18	0	1	0	3 (Note: Appearances in UEFA Champions League)	0	22	0
Torino	2023–24	Serie A	37	1	2	0	—		39	1
Torino	2024–25	Serie A	1	0	1	0	—		2	0
Torino	Total		38	1	3	0	—		41	1
Atalanta	2024–25	Serie A	34	0	1	0	8	1	43	1
Atalanta	2025–26	Serie A	24	0	3	0	9	0	36	0
Atalanta	Total		58	0	4	0	17	1	79	1
Career total			177	2	9	0	20	1	206	3

=== International ===
As of match played 13 November 2025

Appearances and goals by national team and year
National team	Year	Apps	Goals
Italy	2024	4	0
Italy	2025	2	0
Total		6	0

== Honours ==
Inter Milan

- Coppa Italia: 2022–23
- Supercoppa Italiana: 2022
- UEFA Champions League runner-up: 2022–23

Individual

- Serie A Team of the Year: 2023–24
