= Kevin Haveri =

Albanian footballer (born 2001)

Personal information
- Date of birth: 18 September 2001 (age 25)
- Place of birth: Shkodër, Albania
- Height: 1.91 m (6 ft 3 in)
- Position: Left-back

Youth career
- –2012: ADA
- 2012–2019: Albanian Ajax School
- 2019–2020: Mantova

Senior career*
Years	Team	Apps	(Gls)
2019–2020	Mantova	5	(0)
2020–2021	Campodarsego	17	(0)
2021–2023	Rimini	58	(0)
2023–2025	Torino	0	(0)
2023–2024	→ Ascoli (loan)	6	(0)
2024	→ Catania (loan)	3	(0)
2024–2025	→ Campobasso (loan)	11	(1)
2025	→ Messina (loan)	9	(0)
2025–2026	Livorno	11	(0)

International career^{‡}
2017	Albania U17	2	(0)
2019	Albania U19	1	(0)
- * Club domestic league appearances and goals as of 30 April 2026 ‡ National team caps and goals as of 23:00, 13 June 2022 (UTC)

Kevin Haveri (born 18 September 2001) is an Albanian professional footballer who plays as a left-back.

== Club career ==
Born in Shkodër, Haveri started playing football at Basania & AM, before joining local club Akademia AAS in 2012, aged 11.

Following a successful period on trial with Italian club Mantova, on 15 October 2019 Haveri officially joined the Serie D side on a free transfer. He collected five appearances throughout the season, as Mantova gained direct promotion to Serie C after finishing at the top of their group.

In summer 2020, Haveri joined fellow Serie D side Campodarsego on a free transfer. However, his playing time at the club was cut short by injuries and complications of COVID-19.

On 6 August 2021, Haveri was signed by Serie D club Rimini. Throughout the 2021–22 league campaign, the Albanian collected 33 appearances and four assists, as his team eventually won their group and got promoted to Serie C.

After attracting the interest of several top-tier and second-tier clubs across Italy, in the summer of 2022 Haveri reached an agreement to join Serie A side Torino for an estimated fee of 300.000 euros: however, the deal could not be completed, due to the Italian federation's rules involving the registration of non-EU players by professional teams.

The full-back was subsequently re-signed by Rimini, penning a new contract until 2025. In January 2023, the club and Torino made a new attempt to complete the transfer of Haveri, but the deal fell through again. Throughout the 2022–23 season, he helped Rimini reach the promotional play-offs, as they ultimately lost to Pontedera in the first round.

On 3 July 2023, Haveri officially joined Torino for an undisclosed fee, reportedly signing a three-year contract with the club. On 14 July, he was sent to Serie B side Ascoli on a season-long loan, with an option to buy for the club and a buy-back clause in favor of Torino.

On 27 January 2024, Haveri was re-called by Torino, and subsequently loaned out to Serie C side Catania until the end of the season.

On 16 July 2024, he joined Campobasso on loan.

== International career ==
Haveri has represented Albania at several youth international levels, having featured for the under-17 and under-19 national teams.

In May 2022, after being initially selected for the under-21 national team, he received his first call-up to the senior national team, led by head coach Edoardo Reja, for a friendly match against Estonia.

== Style of play ==
Haveri is a left-back, who can also play as a left wing-back. He has been mainly regarded for his physical and athletic attributes, as well as his defensive skills and his ability to serve assists for his team-mates.

== Personal life ==
Haveri has studied Economy at the University of Bologna.

== Career statistics ==
=== Club ===
As of 3 September 2023

Appearances and goals by club, season and competition
Club	Season	League			National cup		Other		Total	
Club	Season	Division	Apps	Goals	Apps	Goals	Apps	Goals	Apps	Goals
Mantova	2019–20	Serie D	5	0	—		0	0	5	0
Campodarsego	2020–21	Serie D	17	0	—		0	0	17	0
Rimini	2021–22	Serie D	33	0	—		1 (Note: Appearances in Coppa Italia Serie D.)	0	34	0
Rimini	2022–23	Serie C	25	0	—		2 (Note: Appearances in Coppa Italia Serie C.)	0	27	0
Rimini	Total		58	0	0	0	3	0	61	0
Torino	2023–24	Serie A	0	0	0	0	0	0	0	0
Ascoli	2023–24	Serie B	1	0	1	0	0	0	2	0
Career total			81	0	1	0	3	0	85	0

== Honours ==
Rimini

- Serie D Group D: 2021–22
