= Brian Bayeye =

DR Congolese footballer (born 2000)

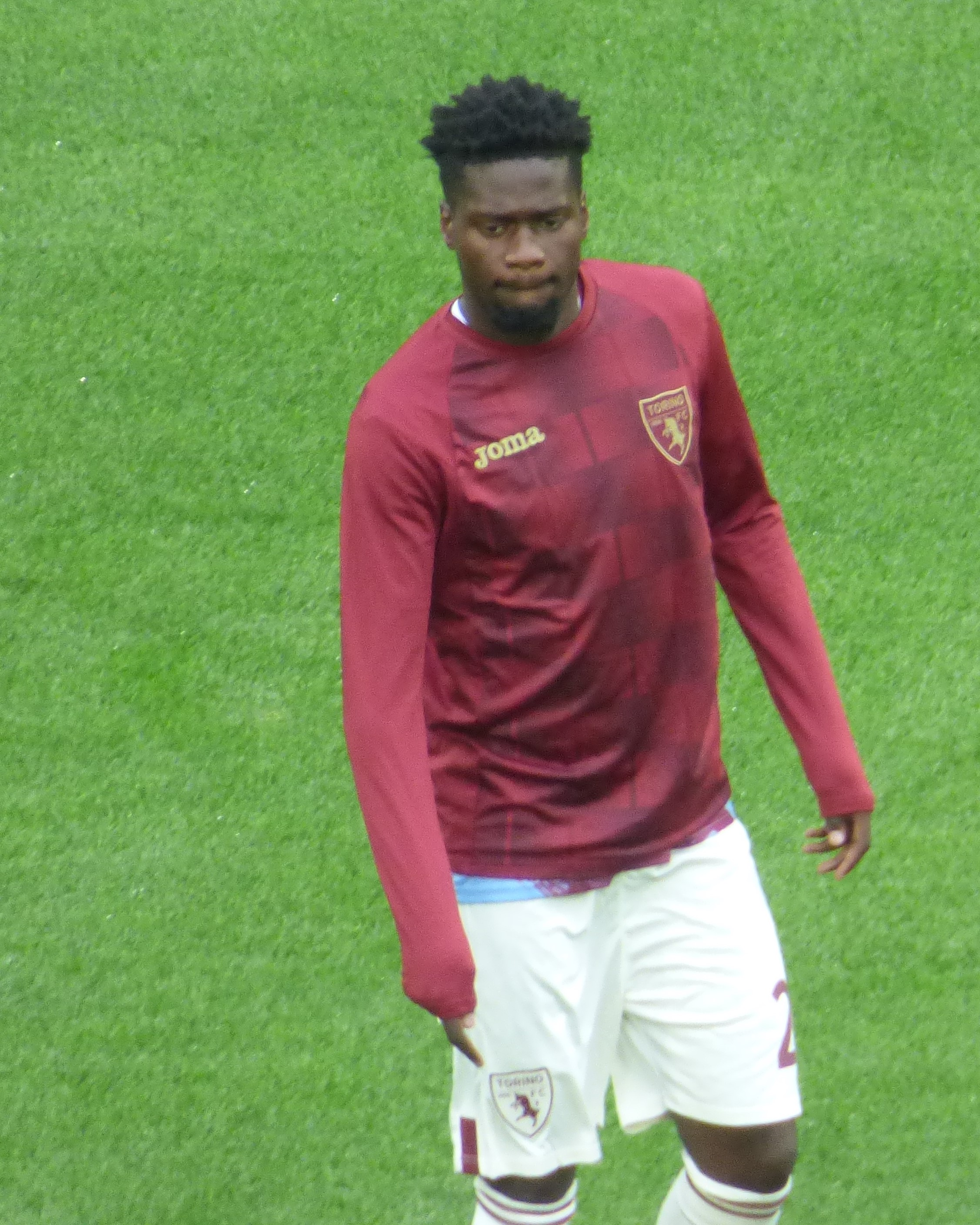
- Bayeye with Torino in 2023

Personal information
- Full name: Brian Jephte Bayeye Kifutu
- Date of birth: 30 June 2000 (age 26)
- Place of birth: Pontault-Combault, France
- Height: 1.81 m (5 ft 11 in)
- Positions: Right-back; right wing-back

Team information
- Current team: Botoșani
- Number: 2

Youth career
- –2015: US Roissy-en-Brie
- 2015–2017: Torcy
- 2017–2019: Troyes

Senior career*
Years	Team	Apps	(Gls)
2018–2019	Troyes B	2	(0)
2019–2022	Catanzaro	27	(0)
2020–2021	→ Carpi (loan)	21	(0)
2022–2025	Torino	2	(0)
2023–2024	→ Ascoli (loan)	19	(0)
2025	→ Radnički Niš (loan)	7	(0)
2026–	Villefranche	13	(0)
2026–	Botoșani	13	(0)

International career^{‡}
2023–	DR Congo	4	(0)
- * Club domestic league appearances and goals as of 1 November 2026 ‡ National team caps and goals as of 25 March 2026

Brian Jephte Bayeye Kifutu (born 30 June 2000) is a professional footballer who plays as a right back or right wing-back for Liga I club Botoșani. Born in France, he plays for the DR Congo national team.

== Club career ==
Bayeye started his career with French fifth tier side Troyes B. In 2019, he signed for Catanzaro in the Italian third tier. In 2022, Bayeye signed for Italian Serie A club Torino. On 6 August 2022, he debuted for Torino during a 3–0 cup win over Palermo.

On 31 August 2023, Bayeye joined Ascoli on loan with an option to buy.

On 7 February 2025, Bayeye was loaned to Radnički Niš in Serbia.

== International career ==
Bayeye was born in Paris to a DR Congolese family. On 2 October 2023, he was called up to the DR Congo national team for a set of friendlies.

On 27 December 2023, he was selected from the list of 24 Congolese players selected by Sébastien Desabre to compete in the 2023 Africa Cup of Nations.

== Career statistics ==
=== Club ===
As of match played 1 November 2026

Appearances and goals by club, season and competition
Club	Season	League			National cup (Note: Includes Coppa Italia Serie C, Coppa Italia, Cupa României)		Other		Total	
Club	Season	Division	Apps	Goals	Apps	Goals	Apps	Goals	Apps	Goals
Troyes B	2017–18	Championnat National 3	2	0	—		—		2	0
Catanzaro	2019–20	Serie C	2	0	0	0	0	0	2	0
Catanzaro	2020–21	Serie C	1	0	2	0	—		3	0
Catanzaro	2021–22	Serie C	24	0	3	0	4 (Note: Appearances in Serie C promotion play-offs)	0	31	0
Catanzaro	Total		27	0	5	0	4	0	37	0
Carpi (loan)	2020–21	Serie C	21	0	—		—		21	0
Torino	2022–23	Serie A	2	0	2	0	—		4	0
Torino	2023–24	Serie A	0	0	1	0	—		1	0
Torino	2024–25	Serie A	0	0	0	0	—		0	0
Torino	Total		2	0	3	0	—		5	0
Ascoli (loan)	2023–24	Serie B	19	0	—		—		19	0
Radnički Niš (loan)	2024–25	Serbian SuperLiga	7	0	2	0	—		9	0
Villefranche	2025–26	Championnat National	13	0	—		—		13	0
Botoșani	2026–27	Liga I	13	0	3	0	—		16	0
Career total			104	0	13	0	4	0	121	0

=== International ===
As of match played 25 March 2026

Appearances and goals by national team and year
National team	Year	Apps	Goals
DR Congo	2023	1	0
DR Congo	2024	2	0
DR Congo	2025	0	0
DR Congo	2026	1	0
Total		4	0
