= 2015–16 Stade Malherbe Caen season =

SM Caen
2015–16 season
- Chairman: Jean-François Fortin
- Manager: Patrice Garande
- Stadium: Stade Michel d'Ornano
- Ligue 1: 7th
- Coupe de France: Round of 64
- Coupe de la Ligue: Round of 32
- Top goalscorer: League: Andy Delort (10); All: Andy Delort (11)
- Highest home attendance: 20,679 vs Paris (19 December 2015)
- Lowest home attendance: 10,098 vs Nice (28 October 2015)
Home colours	Away colours	Third colours

The 2015–16 Stade Malherbe Caen season was the 103rd season of the club since its creation in 1913, the 15th in Ligue 1.

== Players ==
French teams are limited to four players without EU citizenship. Hence, the squad list includes only the principal nationality of each player; several non-European players on the squad have dual citizenship with an EU country. Also, players from the ACP countries—countries in Africa, the Caribbean, and the Pacific that are signatories to the Cotonou Agreement—are not counted against non-EU quotas due to the Kolpak ruling.

=== Current squad ===
As of 1 February 2016.

Note: Flags indicate national team as defined under FIFA eligibility rules; some limited exceptions apply. Players may hold more than one non-FIFA nationality.

No.	Pos.	Nation	Player
1	GK	FRA	Rémy Vercoutre
2	MF	FRA	Nicolas Seube
4	MF	CIV	Ismaël Diomande (on loan from Saint-Étienne)
5	DF	TUN	Alaeddine Yahia
6	MF	FRA	Jonathan Delaplace
8	MF	COD	Jordan Nkololo
9	FW	FRA	Andy Delort
10	FW	BDI	Saidi Ntibazonkiza
11	MF	FRA	Vincent Bessat
12	DF	FRA	Dennis Appiah
13	DF	TUN	Syam Ben Youssef
14	FW	HAI	Jeff Louis
15	DF	BEN	Emmanuel Imorou
16	GK	FRA	Louis Deschateaux

No.	Pos.	Nation	Player
17	MF	FRA	Jean-Victor Makengo
18	MF	BEN	Jordan Adeoti
19	MF	FRA	Jordan Leborgne
20	FW	HAI	Hervé Bazile
21	DF	COM	Chaker Alhadhur
22	DF	FRA	Alexandre Raineau
23	FW	REU	Ronny Rodelin (on loan from Lille)
24	FW	CIV	Christian Kouakou
25	MF	FRA	Julien Féret (captain)
26	MF	FRA	Jonathan Beaulieu
28	DF	FRA	Damien Da Silva
29	DF	FRA	Florian Le Joncour
30	GK	FRA	Paul Reulet

=== Out on loan ===
Note: Flags indicate national team as defined under FIFA eligibility rules; some limited exceptions apply. Players may hold more than one non-FIFA nationality.

No.	Pos.	Nation	Player
—	DF	FRA	Cheik Traoré (on loan to Avranches)
—	FW	SEN	Pape Sané (on loan to FBBP 01)

== Transfers ==
=== Transfers in ===
Date	Pos.	Player	Age	Moved from	Fee	Notes
1 July 2015	DF	(Tunisia) Syam Ben Youssef	26	(Romania) Astra Giurgiu	Free transfer	
1 July 2015	DF	(France) Florian Le Joncour	20	(France) Concarneau	Free transfer	
1 July 2015	MF	(Democratic Republic of the Congo) Jordan Nkololo	22	(France) Clermont Foot	Free transfer	
1 July 2015	MF	(France) Vincent Bessat	29	(France) Nantes	Free transfer	
1 July 2015	DF	(Comoros) Chaker Alhadhur	23	(France) Nantes	Undisclosed	
2 July 2015	FW	(France) Andy Delort	23	(England) Wigan Athletic	£980,000	
3 July 2015	MF	(France) Jonathan Delaplace	29	(France) Lille	Undisclosed	
20 July 2015	FW	(Haiti) Jeff Louis	22	(Belgium) Standard Liège	Undisclosed	
15 September 2015	MF	(Burundi) Saidi Ntibazonkiza	28	Free agent	Free transfer	
1 February 2016	FW	(Ivory Coast) Christian Kouakou	24	(France) Tours	Undisclosed	
1 February 2016	FW	(Senegal) Pape Sané	25	(France) FBBP 01	Undisclosed	

=== Loans in ===
Date	Pos.	Player	Age	Loaned from	Return date	Notes
31 August 2015	FW	(France) Ronny Rodelin	25	(France) Lille	30 June 2016	
25 January 2016	MF	(Ivory Coast) Ismaël Diomandé	25	(France) Saint-Étienne	30 June 2016	

=== Transfers out ===
Date	Pos.	Player	Age	Moved to	Fee	Notes
1 July 2015	MF	(France) Thomas Lemar	19	(France) Monaco	Undisclosed	
1 July 2015	MF	(France) José Saez	33	Unattached	Released	
1 July 2015	DF	(Brazil) Felipe Saad	31	(France) Strasbourg	Released	
3 July 2015	DF	(Gabon) Yrondu Musavu-King	23	(Spain) Granada	Free transfer	
16 July 2015	GK	(France) Damien Perquis	29	(France) Valenciennes	Undisclosed	
21 July 2015	FW	(France) Bengali-Fodé Koita	24	(England) Blackburn Rovers	Free transfer	
25 July 2015	DF	(Haiti) Jean-Jacques Pierre	34	(France) Paris FC	Free transfer	
3 August 2015	MF	(France) N'Golo Kanté	24	(England) Leicester City	€8,000,000	
20 August 2015	FW	(France) Mathieu Duhamel	31	(France) Le Havre	Undisclosed	
31 August 2015	MF	(France) Lenny Nangis	21	(France) Lille	Undisclosed	
31 August 2015	FW	(France) Florian Raspentino	26	(France) Bastia	Undisclosed	

=== Loans out ===
Date	Pos.	Player	Age	Loaned to	Return date	Notes
7 July 2015	DF	(France) Cheik Traoré	20	(France) Avranches	30 June 2016	
1 February 2016	FW	(Senegal) Pape Sané	24	(France) FBBP 01	30 June 2016	

== Competitions ==
=== Ligue 1 ===
==== League table ====
Pos	Team	Pld	W	D	L	GF	GA	GD	Pts	Qualification or relegation
5	Lille	38	15	15	8	39	27	+12	60	Qualification for the Europa League third qualifying round (Note: Since the winners of the 2015–16 Coupe de France and the 2015–16 Coupe de la Ligue, Paris Saint-Germain, qualified for European competition based on their league position, the spot awarded to the Coupe de France winners (Europa League group stage) was passed to the fourth-placed team and the spot awarded to the Coupe de la Ligue winners (Europa League third qualifying round) was passed to the sixth-placed team. The fifth-placed team received the spot in Europa League third qualifying round originally designated to the fourth-placed team.)
6	Saint-Étienne	38	17	7	14	42	37	+5	58	Qualification for the Europa League third qualifying round
7	Caen	38	16	6	16	39	52	−13	54	
8	Rennes	38	13	13	12	52	54	−2	52	
9	Angers	38	13	11	14	40	38	+2	50	

Source: Ligue 1, Soccerway
Rules for classification: 1) Points; 2) Goal difference; 3) Goals scored; 4) Head-to-head points; 5) Head-to-head goal difference; 6) Fairplay ranking.

==== Results summary ====
Overall								Home						Away					
Pld	W	D	L	GF	GA	GD	Pts	W	D	L	GF	GA	GD	W	D	L	GF	GA	GD
38	16	6	16	39	52	−13	54	9	3	7	19	23	−4	7	3	9	20	29	−9

Last updated: 15 May 2016.
Source: Competitive matches

==== Results by round ====
Round	1	2	3	4	5	6	7	8	9	10	11	12	13	14	15	16	17	18	19	20	21	22	23	24	25	26	27	28	29	30	31	32	33	34	35	36	37	38
Ground	A	H	A	H	A	H	A	H	H	A	H	A	H	H	A	A	H	A	H	A	H	A	H	A	H	A	H	A	H	A	H	A	H	A	A	H	A	H
Result	W	W	L	L	W	W	L	W	W	W	L	L	W	D	W	D	L	D	L	L	L	W	W	L	L	L	W	W	D	L	W	L	L	L	D	D	W	W
Position	6	3	6	9	5	4	7	6	3	3	3	5	3	3	2	2	3	4	4	5	7	7	5	5	8	10	7	4	6		6	8	9	9	9	8	9	7

Source: Ligue1
A = Away; H = Home; W = Win; D = Draw; L = Loss

==== Matches ====
Win Draw Loss

8 August 2015 1	Marseille	0–1	Caen	Marseille
21:00 CEST (UTC+02:00)	Sparagna (yellow card) 82'	Report	Delort 27'	Stadium: Stade Vélodrome; Attendance: 60,458; Referee: Frank Schneider

15 August 2015 2	Caen	1–0	Toulouse	Caen
21:00 CEST (UTC+02:00)	Adeoti (yellow card) 45+1'; Da Silva 69'	Report	Didot (yellow card) 69'; Ben Yedder (yellow card) 78'; Doumbia (yellow card) 89'; Spajić (red card) 90'	Stadium: Stade Michel d'Ornano; Attendance: 16,791; Referee: Stéphane Jochem

22 August 2015 3	Nice	2–1	Caen	Nice
20:00 CEST (UTC+02:00)	Ben Arfa 66'; Koziello (yellow card) 71'; Pléa 77'	Report	Nangis (yellow card) 45'; Delort 67'; Seube (yellow card) 72'; Louis (yellow card) 82'	Stadium: Allianz Riviera; Attendance: 15,908; Referee: Jérôme Miguelgorry

29 August 2015 4	Caen	0–4	Lyon	Caen
17:00 CEST (UTC+02:00)	Alhadhur (yellow card) 67'; Da Silva (red card) 73'	Report	Fekir 19', 44', 57'; Beauvue 87'	Stadium: Stade Michel d'Ornano; Attendance: 19,795; Referee: Nicolas Rainville

12 September 2015 5	Troyes	1–3	Caen	Troyes
20:00 CEST (UTC+02:00)	Mavinga (yellow card) 34'; Pi (yellow card) 57'; Court (yellow card) 65'; Veškovac (yellow card) 89'; Othon 90+2'	Report	Féret 21'; Yahia 38'; Ben Youssef (yellow card) 43' (yellow-red card) 57'; Bessat 63'	Stadium: Stade de l'Aube; Attendance: 10,795; Referee: Bartolomeu Varela

19 September 2015 6	Caen	2–1	Montpellier	Caen
20:00 CEST (UTC+02:00)	Rodelin 19'; Adéoti (yellow card) 31'; Delort (yellow card) 47'; Louis 90+2'	Report	Martin 32' (pen.); Yatabaré (yellow card) 41'; Boudebouz (yellow card) 46'; Deplagne (yellow card) 87'; Lasne (yellow card) 89'	Stadium: Stade Michel d'Ornano; Attendance: 15,069; Referee: Hakim Ben El Hadj

23 September 2015 7	Lorient	2–0	Caen	Lorient
19:00 CEST (UTC+02:00)	Le Goff (yellow card) 11'; Moukandjo 13'; Waris 36'; Bellugou (yellow card) 51'	Report	Ben Youssef (yellow card) 71'; Nkololo (yellow card) 75'	Stadium: Stade du Moustoir; Attendance: 9,067; Referee: Saïd Ennjimi

26 September 2015 8	Caen	2–0	Gazélec Ajaccio	Caen
20:00 CEST (UTC+02:00)	Rodelin 28'; Imorou 55'; Leborgne (yellow card) 64'	Report	Đoković (yellow card) 38'; Filippi (yellow card) 48'; Lemoigne (yellow card) 50'; Mangane (yellow card) 57'	Stadium: Stade Michel d'Ornano; Attendance: 15,835; Referee: Lionel Jaffredo

4 October 2015 9	Caen	1–0	Saint-Étienne	Caen
17:00 CEST (UTC+02:00)	Delort 62'	Report	Diomande (yellow card) 41'; Brison (yellow card) 51'; Ruffier (yellow card) 90'	Stadium: Stade Michel d'Ornano; Attendance: 19,070; Referee: Johan Hamel

17 October 2015 10	Reims	0–1	Caen	Reims
20:00 CEST (UTC+02:00)	Kyei (yellow card) 13'; Mfulu (yellow card) 19'	Report	Leborgne (yellow card) 24'; Appiah (yellow card) 52'; Yahia (yellow card) 67'; Féret 74'	Stadium: Stade Auguste Delaune; Attendance: 10,555; Referee: Wilfried Bien

23 October 2015 11	Caen	0–2	Nantes	Caen
18:30 CEST (UTC+02:00)	Appiah (yellow card) 36'	Report	Bammou 23'; Thomasson 61'; Moimbé (yellow card) 73'; Riou (yellow card) 83'	Stadium: Stade Michel d'Ornano; Attendance: 19,571; Referee: Stéphane Lannoy

31 October 2015 12	Bastia	1–0	Caen	Furiani
20:00 CET (UTC+01:00)	Diallo 31'; Cahuzac (yellow card) 58'	Report	Yahia (yellow card) 43'; Da Silva (yellow card) 55'	Stadium: Stade Armand Cesari; Attendance: 10,386; Referee: Benoît Millot

7 November 2015 13	Caen	2–1	Guingamp	Caen
20:00 CET (UTC+01:00)	Féret 62'; Delort (yellow card) 67'; Delort 71'	Report	Jacobsen (yellow card) 51'; Lévêque 85'	Stadium: Stade Michel d'Ornano; Attendance: 16,111; Referee: Jérôme Miguelgorry

22 November 2015 14	Caen	0–0	Angers	Caen
14:00 CET (UTC+01:00)	Yahia (red card) 32'; Féret (yellow card) 33'	Report	Capelle (yellow card) 85'	Stadium: Stade Michel d'Ornano; Attendance: 18,101; Referee: Frank Schneider

29 November 2015 15	Bordeaux	1–4	Caen	Bordeaux
17:00 CET (UTC+01:00)	Saivet (yellow card) 16'; Sané (yellow card) 55'; Chantôme (yellow card) 62'; Biyogo Poko (yellow card) 64' (yellow-red card) 81'; Ounas (yellow card) 90'; Crivelli 90'	Report	Ben Youssef 6'; Alhadhur (yellow card) 27'; Da Silva 56'; Carrasso 61' (o.g.); Delort 77'; Adéoti (yellow card) 82'	Stadium: Matmut Atlantique; Attendance: 18,830; Referee: Tony Chapron

2 December 2015 16	Monaco	1–1	Caen	Fontvieille
19:00 CET (UTC+01:00)	Carrillo 56'	Report	Bessat (yellow card) 30'; Leborgne (yellow card) 77'; Rodelin 86'	Stadium: Stade Louis II; Attendance: 5,388; Referee: Stéphane Lannoy

5 December 2015 17	Caen	1–2	Lille	Caen
20:00 CET (UTC+01:00)	Yahia (yellow card) 31'; Delort 70' (pen.); Delaplace (yellow card) 78'	Report	Benzia 28', 56', (yellow card) 62'; Boufal (yellow card) 62'; Enyeama (yellow card) 86'	Stadium: Stade Michel d'Ornano; Attendance: 15,952; Referee: Saïd Ennjimi

11 December 2015 18	Rennes	1–1	Caen	Rennes
20:30 CET (UTC+01:00)	Doucouré (yellow card) 51'; Quintero 62'	Report	Imorou (red card) 36'; Ben Youssef 79'	Stadium: Roazhon Park; Attendance: 23,471; Referee: Johan Hamel

19 December 2015 19	Caen	0–3	Paris Saint-Germain	Caen
17:00 CET (UTC+01:00)	Seube (yellow card) 42'; Da Silva (yellow card) 62'; Makengo (yellow card) 64'	Report	Di María 16', 50'; Ibrahimović 36'; Silva (yellow card) 83'; Aurier (yellow card) 83'	Stadium: Stade Michel d'Ornano; Attendance: 20,679; Referee: Lionel Jaffredo

9 January 2016 20	Angers	2–0	Caen	Angers
20:00 CET (UTC+01:00)	Capelle 41'; Ketkeophomphone 74'	Report	Delort (yellow card) 61'; Seube (yellow card) 67'	Stadium: Stade Jean-Bouin; Attendance: 12,208; Referee: Nicolas Rainville

17 January 2016 21	Caen	1–3	Marseille	Caen
17:00 CET (UTC+01:00)	Imorou (yellow card) 14'; Bazile (yellow card) 44'; Rodelin 67'	Report	Batshuayi 12'; Dja Djédjé (yellow card) 57'; Nkoudou 60'; Sarr 83'	Stadium: Stade Michel d'Ornano; Attendance: 20,513; Referee: Amaury Delerue

23 January 2016 22	Montpellier	1–2	Caen	Montpellier
20:00 CET (UTC+01:00)	Bensebaini 23'; Roussillon (yellow card) 58'; Saihi (yellow card) 71'	Report	Vercoutre (yellow card) 23'; Rodelin 40'; Delort 52'	Stadium: Stade de la Mosson; Attendance: 9,076; Referee: François Letexier

31 January 2016 23	Caen	2–0	Nice	Caen
20:00 CET (UTC+01:00)	Rodelin 12'; Delort 41' (pen.); Nkololo (yellow card) 80'	Report	Bodmer (yellow card) 30'; Koziello (yellow card) 90+3'	Stadium: Stade Michel d'Ornano; Attendance: 17,061; Referee: Stéphane Lannoy

3 February 2016 24	Lille	1–0	Caen	Villeneuve d'Ascq
19:00 CET (UTC+01:00)	Soumaoro 59'	Report	Nkololo (yellow card) 58' (yellow-red card) 85'; Delort (yellow card) 65'	Stadium: Stade Pierre-Mauroy; Attendance: 27,312; Referee: Stéphane Jochem

6 February 2016 25	Caen	0–2	Reims	Caen
20:00 CET (UTC+01:00)	Da Silva (yellow card) 21'; Kouakou (yellow card) 49'; Adéoti (yellow card) 62'	Report	Bifouma 20'; Kankava (yellow card) 52'; Traoré (yellow card) 59'; Oniangue 63'	Stadium: Stade Michel d'Ornano; Attendance: 16,018; Referee: Bartolomeu Varela

13 February 2016 26	Lyon	4–1	Caen	Lyon
14:00 CET (UTC+01:00)	Umtiti 8'; Lacazette 16'; Cornet 45', (yellow card) 46'; Gonalons (yellow card) 56'; Ferri (yellow card) 72'; Tolisso 83'	Report	Da Silva (yellow card) 7'; Bessat (yellow card) 28'; Delort 58'; Nkololo (yellow card) 64'; Yahia (yellow card) 68'; Seube (yellow card) 69'	Stadium: Parc Olympique Lyonnais; Attendance: 38,624; Referee: Ruddy Buquet

21 February 2016 27	Caen	1–0	Rennes	Caen
17:00 CET (UTC+01:00)	Delort (yellow card) 47'; Ntibazonkiza 54'	Report	Mendes (yellow card) 24'	Stadium: Stade Michel d'Ornano; Attendance: 15,455; Referee: Tony Chapron

28 February 2016 28	Saint-Étienne	1–2	Caen	Saint-Étienne
17:00 CET (UTC+01:00)	Tannane (yellow card) 6'; Lemoine (yellow card) 36'; Eysseric 90+1'	Report	Adeoti (yellow card) 4'; Delort 78'; Rodelin 82'	Stadium: Stade Geoffroy-Guichard; Attendance: 29,475; Referee: Frank Schneider

4 March 2016 29	Caen	2–2	Monaco	Caen
20:30 CET (UTC+01:00)	Yahia (yellow card) 63'; Féret 64' (pen.); Kouakou 89'	Report	Lemar 56'; Fabinho (yellow card) 63'; Yahia 69' (o.g.); Silva (yellow card) 74'; Toulalan (yellow card) 85'; Costa (yellow card) 90+1'	Stadium: Stade Michel d'Ornano; Attendance: 17,926; Referee: Clément Turpin

12 March 2016 30	Gazélec Ajaccio	1–0	Caen	Ajaccio
20:00 CET (UTC+01:00)	Boutaïb 70'	Report		Stadium: Stade Ange Casanova; Attendance: 3,488; Referee: Bartolomeu Varela

19 March 2016 31	Caen	2–1	Troyes	Caen
20:00 CET (UTC+01:00)	Yahia 35'; Rodelin (yellow card) 37', (goal) 54'	Report	Thiago Xavier 22'; Rincón (yellow card) 31'; Court (yellow card) 44'	Stadium: Stade Michel d'Ornano; Attendance: 17,585; Referee: Lionel Jaffredo

2 April 2016 32	Toulouse	2–0	Caen	Toulouse
20:00 CEST (UTC+02:00)	Rodelin 30' (o.g.); Diop (yellow card) 47'; Braithwaite 84'	Report	Seube (yellow card) 74'	Stadium: Stadium Municipal; Attendance: 14,002; Referee: François Letexier

9 April 2016 33	Caen	1–2	Lorient	Caen
20:00 CET (UTC+1)	Appiah 64'; Vercoutre (yellow card) 75'	Report	Jeannot 17'; Waris 47' (pen.)	Stadium: Stade Michel d'Ornano; Attendance: 17,408; Referee: Tony Chapron

16 April 2016 34	Paris Saint-Germain	6–0	Caen	Paris
17:00 CEST (UTC+01:00)	Ibrahimović 12', 56'; Matuidi 45'; Cavani 49'; Di María 52'; Maxwell 76'	Report		Stadium: Parc des Princes; Attendance: 44,807; Referee: Bartolomeu Varela

24 April 2016 35	Guingamp	1–1	Caen	Guingamp
17:00 CEST (UTC+02:00)	Diallo (yellow card) 41'; Giresse (red card) 79'; Sorbon 82'	Report	Rodelin 30'; Seube (yellow card) 62' (yellow-red card) 90+2'	Stadium: Stade du Roudourou; Attendance: 16,203; Referee: Benoît Millot

30 April 2016 36	Caen	0–0	Bastia	Caen
19:00 CET (UTC+01:00)	Diomande (yellow card) 75'	Report	Modesto (yellow card) 40'; Kamano (yellow card) 63'; Marange (yellow card) 73'	Stadium: Stade Michel d'Ornano; Attendance: 17,016; Referee: Jérôme Miguelgorry

7 May 2016 37	Nantes	1–2	Caen	Nantes
21:00 CEST (UTC+02:00)	Djidji (yellow card) 50'; Bedoya 78'; Sala (yellow card) 90'	Report	Rodelin 5'; Delort 45' (pen.); Delaplcae (yellow card) 61'; Adeoti (yellow card) 76'	Stadium: Stade de la Beaujoire; Attendance: 30,321; Referee: Johan Hamel

14 May 2016 38	Caen	1–0	Bordeaux	Caen
21:00 CEST (UTC+02:00)	Delort 14' (pen.); Louis (yellow card) 25'	Report	Contento (yellow card) 15'; Plašil (yellow card) 15'; Pallois (yellow card) 28'; Crivelli (yellow card) 72'	Stadium: Stade Michel d'Ornano; Attendance: 19,599; Referee: Tony Chapron

=== Coupe de la Ligue ===
28 October 2015 Round of 32	Caen	1–2	Nice	Caen
21:00 CET (UTC+01:00)	Delort 14'; Adéoti (yellow card) 90+1'	Report	Mendy 57', 90+2'	Stadium: Stade Michel d'Ornano; Attendance: 10,098; Referee: Stéphane Jochem

=== Coupe de France ===
3 January 2016 Round of 64	Caen	0–0 (a.e.t.) (1–3 p)	Marseille	Caen
20:45 CEST (UTC+02:00)		Report		Stadium: Stade Michel d'Ornano; Attendance: 15,887; Referee: Jérôme Miguelgorry
	Penalties
	Féret (penalty missed); Ben Youssef (penalty missed); Yahia (penalty scored); Bessat (penalty missed)		Diarra (penalty scored); Rolando (penalty scored); Batshuayi (penalty scored)

== Squad statistics ==
No.	Pos.	Nat.	Name	Aps	Gls	Ast	Yellow card	Red card
Goalkeepers
1	GK	(France)	Rémy Vercoutre	39	0	0	2	0
16	GK	(France)	Louis Deschateaux	0	0	0	0	0
30	GK	(France)	Paul Reulet	1	0	0	0	0
Defenders
5	DF	(Tunisia)	Alaeddine Yahia	27	1	0	5	1
12	DF	(France)	Dennis Appiah	40	1	1	2	0
13	DF	(Tunisia)	Syam Ben Youssef	20	3	1	2	1
15	DF	(Benin)	Emmanuel Imorou	15	1	1	1	1
21	DF	(Comoros)	Chaker Alhadhur	11	0	0	2	0
22	DF	(France)	Alexandre Raineau	8	0	0	0	0
28	DF	(France)	Damien Da Silva	29	2	0	4	1
29	DF	(France)	Florian Le Joncour	0	0	0	0	0
Midfielders
2	MF	(France)	Nicolas Seube	34	0	1	6	1
4	MF	(Ivory Coast)	Ismaël Diomandé	6	0	0	1	0
6	MF	(France)	Jonathan Delaplace	24	0	2	2	0
8	MF	(France)	Jordan Nkololo	18	0	0	4	1
11	MF	(France)	Vincent Bessat	36	1	1	2	0
17	MF	(France)	Jean-Victor Makengo	11	0	0	1	0
18	MF	(France)	Jordan Adéoti	34	0	0	8	0
19	MF	(Benin)	Jordan Leborgne	14	0	1	3	0
25	MF	(France)	Julien Féret	40	4	8	1	0
26	MF	(France)	Jonathan Beaulieu	0	0	0	0	0
--	MF	(France)	Valentin Voisin	0	0	0	0	0
Forwards
7	FW	(France)	Yann Karamoh	0	0	0	0	0
9	FW	(France)	Andy Delort	38	13	2	5	0
10	FW	(Burundi)	Saidi Ntibazonkiza	14	1	0	0	0
14	FW	(Haiti)	Jeff Louis	19	1	0	2	0
20	FW	(France)	Hervé Bazile	26	0	3	1	0
23	FW	(France)	Ronny Rodelin	36	10	2	1	0
24	FW	(Ivory Coast)	Christian Kouakou	6	1	0	1	0
--	FW	(France)	Lenny Nangis	3	0	2	1	0
