= 2014–15 Stade Malherbe Caen season =

SM Caen
2014–15 season
- Chairman: Jean-François Fortin
- Manager: Patrice Garande
- Stadium: Stade Michel d'Ornano
- Ligue 1: 13th
- Coupe de France: Round of 64 vs. Dijon
- Coupe de la Ligue: Round of 16 vs. Bastia
- Top goalscorer: League: Hervé Bazile (7); All: Hervé Bazile; Mathieu Duhamel (8 each)
- Highest home attendance: 20,501 vs Marseille (4 October 2014)
- Lowest home attendance: 4,684 vs Dijon (4 January 2015)
- Average home league attendance: 16,991
Home colours	Away colours

The 2014–15 Stade Malherbe Caen season was the 102nd season of the club since its creation in 1913, the 14th in Ligue 1. It was the club's first season in the top tier following a two-year spell in Ligue 2.

== Players ==
=== First team squad ===
French teams are limited to four players without EU citizenship. Hence, the squad list includes only the principal nationality of each player; several non-European players on the squad have dual citizenship with an EU country. Also, players from the ACP countries—countries in Africa, the Caribbean, and the Pacific that are signatories to the Cotonou Agreement—are not counted against non-EU quotas due to the Kolpak ruling.

Note: Flags indicate national team as defined under FIFA eligibility rules; some limited exceptions apply. Players may hold more than one non-FIFA nationality.

No.	Pos.	Nation	Player
1	GK	FRA	Rémy Vercoutre
2	MF	FRA	Nicolas Seube
3	MF	FRA	Yannick M'Bone
5	DF	TUN	Alaeddine Yahia
7	MF	FRA	Nicolas Benezet (on loan from Évian)
9	FW	GUF	Sloan Privat (on loan from Gent)
10	FW	FRA	Lenny Nangis
11	FW	FRA	Bengali-Fodé Koita
12	DF	FRA	Dennis Appiah
14	FW	ARG	Emiliano Sala (on loan from Bordeaux)
15	DF	BEN	Emmanuel Imorou
16	GK	FRA	Damien Perquis

No.	Pos.	Nation	Player
17	MF	FRA	N'Golo Kanté
18	MF	BEN	Jordan Adéoti
19	DF	BRA	Felipe Saad
20	FW	FRA	Hervé Bazile
21	MF	FRA	José Saez
22	DF	FRA	Alexandre Raineau
23	DF	FRA	Jean Calvé
25	MF	FRA	Julien Féret (Captain)
26	MF	FRA	Jonathan Beaulieu
27	MF	FRA	Thomas Lemar
28	DF	FRA	Damien Da Silva
29	DF	GAB	Yrondu Musavu-King
30	GK	FRA	Paul Reulet

=== Out on loan ===
Note: Flags indicate national team as defined under FIFA eligibility rules; some limited exceptions apply. Players may hold more than one non-FIFA nationality.

No.	Pos.	Nation	Player
7	FW	FRA	Mathieu Duhamel (on loan to Évian Thonon Gaillard F.C.)
13	DF	HAI	Jean-Jacques Pierre (on loan to Angers SCO)
24	FW	FRA	Florian Raspentino (on loan to Dijon FCO)

=== Ligue 1 ===
==== League table ====
Pos	Team	Pld	W	D	L	GF	GA	GD	Pts
11	Nice	38	13	9	16	44	53	−9	48
12	Bastia	38	12	11	15	37	46	−9	47
13	Caen	38	12	10	16	54	55	−1	46
14	Nantes	38	11	12	15	29	40	−11	45
15	Reims	38	12	8	18	47	66	−19	44

Source: Ligue 1
Rules for classification: 1) points; 2) goal difference; 3) number of goals scored

==== Results summary ====
Overall								Home						Away					
Pld	W	D	L	GF	GA	GD	Pts	W	D	L	GF	GA	GD	W	D	L	GF	GA	GD
38	12	10	16	54	55	−1	46	7	3	9	26	25	+1	5	7	7	28	30	−2

Last updated: 19 June 2015.
Source: Competitive matches

==== Results by round ====
Round	1	2	3	4	5	6	7	8	9	10	11	12	13	14	15	16	17	18	19	20	21	22	23	24	25	26	27	28	29	30	31	32	33	34	35	36	37	38
Ground	A	H	A	H	A	A	H	A	H	A	H	A	H	A	H	A	H	A	H	A	H	A	H	H	A	H	A	H	A	H	A	H	A	H	A	H	A	H
Result	W	L	W	L	L	D	L	D	L	D	W	L	L	D	D	L	L	L	D	L	W	W	W	W	D	W	W	L	L	D	W	L	L	L	D	W	D	W
Position	1	9	4	9	12	10	14	13	17	18	15	15	17	16	17	18	19	20	20	20	20	18	15	14	15	14	12	14	14	14	12	13	13	15	14	13	15	13

Source: Ligue1
A = Away; H = Home; W = Win; D = Draw; L = Loss

==== Matches ====
Win Draw Loss

9 August 2014 1	Évian	0–3	Caen	Annecy
21:00 CEST (UTC+02:00)	Juelsgård (yellow card) 47'	Report	Kanté 12'; Duhamel 32', 37'; Imorou (yellow card) 90'	Stadium: Parc des Sports; Attendance: 9,915; Referee: Saïd Ennjimi

15 August 2014 2	Caen	0–1	Lille	Le Mans
20:30 CEST (UTC+02:00)	Kanté (yellow card) 3'; Appiah (red card) 67'; Adeoti (yellow card) 75'	Report	Balmont (yellow card) 2'; Origi 69' (pen.); Marcos Lopes (yellow card) 73'	Stadium: MMArena; Attendance: 12,664; Referee: Sébastien Desiage

23 August 2014 3	Reims	0–2	Caen	Reims
20:00 CEST (UTC+02:00)	Charbonnier (yellow card) 63'	Report	Kanté 83'; Bazile 90+1'	Stadium: Stade Auguste Delaune; Attendance: 12,015; Referee: Wilfried Bien

30 August 2014 4	Caen	0–1	Rennes	Le Mans
20:00 CEST (UTC+02:00)	Kanté (yellow card) 16' (yellow-red card) 29'	Report	Pajot (yellow card) 33'; Armand (yellow card) 74'; Toivonen 88' (pen.)	Stadium: MMArena; Attendance: 12,767; Referee: Alexandre Castro

13 September 2014 5	Saint-Étienne	1–0	Caen	Saint-Étienne
20:00 CEST (UTC+02:00)	Pierre 74' (o.g.)	Report	Seube (yellow card) 60'	Stadium: Stade Geoffroy-Guichard; Attendance: 26,293; Referee: Sébastien Moreira

20 September 2014 6	Toulouse	3–3	Caen	Toulouse
20:00 CEST (UTC+02:00)	Pešić (yellow card) 11'; Ben Yedder 21' (pen.); Ninkov (yellow card) 56', (goal) 87'; Regattin 83' (pen.)	Report	Raspentino 7'; Da Silva (yellow card) 13'; Appiah (yellow card) 32'; Adeoti (yellow card) 58'; Nangis 76'; Calvé 86'	Stadium: Stadium Municipal; Attendance: 13,057; Referee: Benoît Bastien

24 September 2014 7	Caen	0–2	Paris Saint-Germain	Caen
21:00 CEST (UTC+02:00)		Report	Lucas 18'; Marquinhos 56'	Stadium: Stade Michel d'Ornano; Attendance: 19,988; Referee: Wilfried Bien

28 September 2014 8	Lens	0–0	Caen	Amiens
17:00 CEST (UTC+02:00)	Valdivia (yellow card) 41'	Report		Stadium: Stade de la Licorne; Attendance: 8,525; Referee: Clément Turpin

4 October 2014 9	Caen	1–2	Marseille	Caen
17:00 CEST (UTC+02:00)	Musavu-King 84'	Report	Morel (yellow card) 37'; Romao 74'; Gignac 90+3'	Stadium: Stade Michel d'Ornano; Attendance: 20,501; Referee: Benoît Millot

19 October 2014 10	Bordeaux	1–1	Caen	Bordeaux
17:00 CEST (UTC+02:00)	Diabaté 22' (pen.); Sertić (yellow card) 25'; Biyogo Poko (yellow card) 32'	Report	Adeoti (yellow card) 67'; Bazile 77', (yellow card) 90+2'; Féret (yellow card) 90+3'	Stadium: Stade Chaban-Delmas; Attendance: 19,798; Referee: Alexandre Castro

25 October 2014 11	Caen	2–1	Lorient	Caen
20:00 CEST (UTC+02:00)	Nangis 3'; Da Silva (yellow card) 24'; Duhamel 53' (pen.)	Report	Ayew 24' (pen.); Guerreiro (yellow card) 26'; Mostefa (yellow card) 28'; Gassama (yellow card) 84'	Stadium: Stade Michel d'Ornano; Attendance: 15,963; Referee: Frank Schneider

1 November 2014 12	Metz	3–2	Caen	Metz
20:00 CET (UTC+01:00)	Maïga 10', 50'; Choplin (yellow card) 57'; Lejeune (yellow card) 64'; Malouda 90' (pen.)	Report	Calvé 65'; Koita 83'; Yahia (red card) 88'	Stadium: Stade Saint-Symphorien; Attendance: 17,864; Referee: Nicolas Rainville

8 November 2014 13	Caen	1–2	Nantes	Caen
20:00 CET (UTC+01:00)	Duhamel 24'	Report	Vizcarrondo 40'; Veretout 60'; Gomis (yellow card) 67'; Riou (yellow card) 77'; Bedoya (yellow card) 90'	Stadium: Stade Michel d'Ornano; Attendance: 17,900; Referee: Tony Chapron

22 November 2014 14	Monaco	2–2	Caen	Monaco
20:00 CET (UTC+01:00)	Imorou 5' (o.g.); Moutinho 75'	Report	Koita 50'; Kondogbia 59' (o.g.); Da Silva (yellow card) 72'; Raspentino (yellow card) 90+4'	Stadium: Stade Louis II; Attendance: 7,508; Referee: Sébastien Moreira

29 November 2014 15	Caen	1–1	Montpellier	Caen
20:00 CET (UTC+01:00)	Duhamel 40'; Féret (yellow card) 62'; Adeoti (yellow card) 86'	Report	Hilton 17'	Stadium: Stade Michel d'Ornano; Attendance: 14,976; Referee: Wilfried Bien

3 December 2014 16	Guingamp	5–1	Caen	Guingamp
19:00 CET (UTC+01:00)	Mandanne 4', 62'; Diallo (yellow card) 13'; Giresse 20'; Yatabaré (yellow card) 36'; Beauvue 61' (pen.), 78'	Report	Yahia 17'; Nangis (yellow card) 44'; Pierre (red card) 60'	Stadium: Stade du Roudourou; Attendance: 13,423; Referee: Amaury Delerue

6 December 2014 17	Caen	2–3	Nice	Caen
20:00 CET (UTC+01:00)	Lemar (yellow card) 36'; Duhamel 39' (pen.); Nangis 45'	Report	Amavi 32'; Bauthéac 64' (pen.); Pléa 74'; Mendy (yellow card) 88'	Stadium: Stade Michel d'Ornano; Attendance: 13,487; Referee: Clément Turpin

12 December 2014 18	Lyon	3–0	Caen	Lyon
20:30 CET (UTC+01:00)	Lacazette 7' (pen.), 57'; Ferri (yellow card) 47'; Benzia 62'	Report	Seube (yellow card) 45'; Yahia (yellow card) 53'	Stadium: Stade de Gerland; Attendance: 32,972; Referee: Bartolomeu Varela

20 December 2014 19	Caen	1–1	Bastia	Caen
20:00 CET (UTC+01:00)	Koita (yellow card) 49'; Féret 74'	Report	Kamano 21', (yellow card) 66'; Marange (yellow card) 34'; Tallo (yellow card) 88'	Stadium: Stade Michel d'Ornano; Attendance: 14,021; Referee: Benoît Millot

10 January 2015 20	Lille	1–0	Caen	Villeneuve-d'Ascq
20:00 CET (UTC+01:00)	Frey 20'; Kjær (yellow card) 36'	Report	Féret (yellow card) 59'	Stadium: Stade Pierre-Mauroy; Attendance: 34,334; Referee: Olivier Thual

17 January 2015 21	Caen	4–1	Reims	Caen
20:00 CET (UTC+01:00)	Féret 4'; Privat 8'; Yahia 30'; Kanté (yellow card) 70'; Koita 76' (pen.)	Report	Bourillon (yellow card) 15'; Charbonnier 27' (pen.), (yellow card) 78'; Devaux (yellow card) 78'	Stadium: Stade Michel d'Ornano; Attendance: 13,193; Referee: Nicolas Rainville

25 January 2015 22	Rennes	1–4	Caen	Rennes
17:00 CET (UTC+01:00)	André 15'	Report	Privat 4'; Nangis 50'; Féret 85'; Da Silva 89'	Stadium: Roazhon Park; Attendance: 18,091; Referee: Sébastien Moreira

1 February 2015 23	Caen	1–0	Saint-Étienne	Caen
14:00 CET (UTC+01:00)	Féret 41'; Da Silva (yellow card) 42'; Nangis (yellow card) 63'	Report	Clément (yellow card) 83'; Lemoine (yellow card) 87'	Stadium: Stade Michel d'Ornano; Attendance: 19,432; Referee: Bartolomeu Varela

7 February 2015 24	Caen	2–0	Toulouse	Caen
20:00 CET (UTC+01:00)	Privat 17'; Féret 72' (pen.)	Report	Doumbia (yellow card) 4'; Tisserand (yellow card) 54'	Stadium: Stade Michel d'Ornano; Attendance: 13,960; Referee: Wilfried Bien

14 February 2015 25	Paris Saint-Germain	2–2	Caen	Paris
16:00 CET (UTC+01:00)	Ibrahimović 2', (yellow card) 2'; Lavezzi 40'	Report	Da Silva (yellow card) 36'; Adéoti (yellow card) 86'; Sala 89'; Bazile 90+2'	Stadium: Parc des Princes; Attendance: 45,571; Referee: Frank Schneider

21 February 2015 26	Caen	4–1	Lens	Caen
20:00 CET (UTC+01:00)	Féret 7' (pen.); Sala 35', 75'; Bazile 36'; Imorou (yellow card) 38'	Report	El Jadeyaoui 45'; Coulibaly (yellow card) 59'; Valdivia (yellow card) 74'	Stadium: Stade Michel d'Ornano; Attendance: 17,751; Referee: Tony Chapron

28 February 2015 27	Marseille	2–3	Caen	Marseille
20:30 CET (UTC+01:00)	Dja Djédjé (yellow card) 22'; Ayew 45+3'; Gignac 63'	Report	Yahia (yellow card) 2'; Seube 67'; Sala 70'; Benezet 87'	Stadium: Stade Vélodrome; Attendance: 44,614; Referee: Sébastien Desiage

7 March 2015 28	Caen	1–2	Bordeaux	Caen
20:00 CET (UTC+01:00)	Nangis (red card) 31'; Privat 72'; Saad (yellow card) 90+2'	Report	Ilori (yellow card) 54'; Khazri (yellow card) 60'; Rolán 69', 90+5' (pen.); Chantôme (yellow card) 72'; Pallois (yellow card) 88'	Stadium: Stade Michel d'Ornano; Attendance: 20,067; Referee: Olivier Thual

14 March 2015 29	Lorient	2–1	Caen	Lorient
20:00 CET (UTC+01:00)	Guerreiro 43'; Ayew 60'	Report	Da Silva (red card) 17'; Bazile 41'; Felipe Saad (yellow card) 67'	Stadium: Stade du Moustoir; Attendance: 12,877; Referee: Philippe Kalt

21 March 2015 30	Caen	0–0	Metz	Caen
20:00 CET (UTC+01:00)		Report		Stadium: Stade Michel d'Ornano; Attendance: 15,810; Referee: Alexandre Castro

5 April 2015 31	Nantes	1–2	Caen	Nantes
17:00 CEST (UTC+02:00)	Bedoya 11', (yellow card) 73'	Report	Seube (yellow card) 60'; Appiah (yellow card) 62'; Sala 80' (pen.); Lemar 90+2'	Stadium: Stade de la Beaujoire; Attendance: 25,560; Referee: Benoît Millot

10 April 2015 32	Caen	0–3	Monaco	Caen
20:30 CEST (UTC+02:00)	Bazile (yellow card) 27'; Imorou (yellow card) 42'	Report	Martial 29'; Silva 64', 84'	Stadium: Stade Michel d'Ornano; Attendance: 20,065; Referee: Tony Chapron

18 April 2015 33	Montpellier	1–0	Caen	Montpellier
17:00 CEST (UTC+02:00)	Hilton 4'; Congré (yellow card) 69'	Report	Bazile (yellow card) 67'	Stadium: Stade de la Mosson; Attendance: 11,308; Referee: Antony Gautier

25 April 2015 34	Caen	0–2	Guingamp	Caen
20:00 CEST (UTC+02:00)	Kanté (yellow card) 45'; Sala (yellow card) 61'; Yahia (yellow card) 68'	Report	Lemaître (yellow card) 10'; Pied (yellow card) 29'; Beauvue 49'; Marveaux 66'; Angoua (yellow card) 87'	Stadium: Stade Michel d'Ornano; Attendance: 18,807; Referee: Frank Schneider

2 May 2015 35	Nice	1–1	Caen	Nice
20:00 CEST (UTC+02:00)	Carlos Eduardo 41'; Amavi (yellow card) 82'; Honorat (yellow card) 88'	Report	Benezet 15'; Appiah (yellow card) 90+2'	Stadium: Allianz Riviera; Attendance: 19,009; Referee: Philippe Kalt

9 May 2015 36	Caen	3–0	Lyon	Caen
17:00 CEST (UTC+02:00)	Nangis (yellow card) 27'; Benezet 41', 44'; Privat 85'	Report	Lacazette (yellow card) 69'	Stadium: Stade Michel d'Ornano; Attendance: 19,842; Referee: Nicolas Rainville

16 May 2015 37	Bastia	1–1	Caen	Furiani
21:00 CEST (UTC+02:00)	Ayité 12'; Cioni (yellow card) 27'	Report	Privat 10', (yellow card) 84'	Stadium: Stade Armand Cesari; Attendance: 14,902; Referee: Alexandre Castro

23 May 2015 38	Caen	3–2	Évian	Caen
21:00 CEST (UTC+02:00)	Bazile 60', 68'; Sougou 66' (o.g.)	Report	Thomasson (yellow card) 37'; Sorlin 86'; Sougou 90+3'	Stadium: Stade Michel d'Ornano; Attendance: 19,937; Referee: Antony Gautier

=== Coupe de la Ligue ===
28 October 2014 Round of 32	Caen	4–3 (a.e.t.)	Clermont Foot	Caen
20:00 CEST (UTC+02:00)	Féret 55'; Seube (yellow card) 70'; Duhamel 72', 120+1'; Bazile 83'; Yahia (yellow card) 86'	Report	Nkololo (yellow card) 34'; Dugimont 49'; Novillo 61'; Capelle (yellow card) 72'; Diogo 88'	Stadium: Stade Michel d'Ornano; Attendance: 8,635; Referee: Bartolomeu Varela

16 December 2014 Round of 16	Bastia	3–2 (a.e.t.)	Caen	Furiani
18:00	Gillet 42'; Koné 89', (yellow card) 92'; Mokulu (yellow card) 90+3', (goal) 102'	Report	Privat 12'; Saez 72'; Yahia (yellow card) 90+2'; Nangis (yellow card) 103'; Adéoti (yellow card) 104'	Stadium: Stade Armand Cesari; Attendance: 3,034; Referee: Philippe Kalt

=== Coupe de France ===
4 January 2015 Round of 64	Caen	2–3 (a.e.t.)	Dijon	Caen
17:45 CET (UTC+01:00)	Kanté 17'; Adeoti 45', (yellow card) 111'; Da Silva (yellow card) 67'	Report	Paye (yellow card) 32'; Diallo 38'; Diony 80'; Rivière (yellow card) 90'; Mollet 105'; Bela (yellow card) 108'	Stadium: Stade Michel d'Ornano; Attendance: 4,684; Referee: Ruddy Buquet
