= 2013–14 Stade Malherbe Caen season =

Caen
2013–14 season
- President: Jean-François Fortin
- Head coach: Patrice Garande
- Stadium: Stade Michel d'Ornano
- Ligue 2: 3rd (promoted)
- Coupe de France: Round of 16
- Coupe de la Ligue: Round of 16
- Top goalscorer: League: Mathieu Duhamel (24); All: Mathieu Duhamel (24)
Home colours	Away colours	Third colours

The 2013–14 season was Stade Malherbe Caen's 101st season in existence and the club's second consecutive season in the second division of French football.

== Players ==
Note: Flags indicate national team as defined under FIFA eligibility rules; some limited exceptions apply. Players may hold more than one non-FIFA nationality.

No.	Pos.	Nation	Player
1	GK	(France) FRA	Paul Reulet
2	DF	(France) FRA	Nicolas Seube
3	MF	(Cameroon) CMR	Yannick M'Bone
4	DF	(Mali) MLI	Molla Wague
5	MF	(Algeria) ALG	Laurent Agouazi
7	FW	(France) FRA	Mathieu Duhamel
10	MF	(Morocco) MAR	Fayçal Fajr
11	FW	(France) FRA	Bengali-Fodé Koita
12	DF	(France) FRA	Dennis Appiah
13	DF	(Haiti) HAI	Jean-Jacques Pierre
14	DF	(France) FRA	Aurélien Montaroup
15	FW	(France) FRA	Lenny Nangis
16	GK	(France) FRA	Damien Perquis

No.	Pos.	Nation	Player
17	MF	(France) FRA	N'Golo Kanté
19	DF	(Brazil) BRA	Felipe Saad
21	MF	(France) FRA	José Saez
22	DF	(France) FRA	Alexandre Raineau
23	DF	(France) FRA	Jean Calvé
26	MF	(France) FRA	Jonathan Beaulieu
27	MF	(France) FRA	Thomas Lemar
28	FW	(France) FRA	Romain Poyet
30	GK	(France) FRA	Thomas Bosmel
-	GK	(France) FRA	Rémy Vercoutre
-	DF	(Benin) BEN	Jordan Adéoti
-	FW	(France) FRA	Hervé Bazile

== Competitions ==
=== Overall record ===
Competition	First match	Last match	Starting round	Final position	Record							
Competition	First match	Last match	Starting round	Final position	Pld	W	D	L	GF	GA	GD	Win %
Ligue 2	2 August 2013	May 2014	Matchday 1	3rd	38	18	10	10	65	44	+21	47.37
Coupe de France	16 November 2013	11 February 2014	Seventh round	Round of 16	5	4	1	0	11	4	+7	80.00
Coupe de la Ligue	6 August 2013	27 August 2013	First round	Second round	2	1	0	1	2	3	−1	50.00
Total					45	23	11	11	78	51	+27	51.11

Source: Competitions

=== Ligue 2 ===
==== League table ====
Pos	Team	Pld	W	D	L	GF	GA	GD	Pts	Promotion or Relegation
1	Metz (C, P)	38	22	10	6	55	28	+27	76	Promotion to Ligue 1
2	Lens (P)	38	17	14	7	58	40	+18	65	Promoted officially but with some conditions.
3	Caen (P)	38	18	10	10	65	44	+21	64	Promotion to Ligue 1
4	Nancy	38	16	13	9	47	37	+10	61	
5	Niort	38	15	13	10	51	47	+4	58	

Source: Ligue 2
Rules for classification: 1) points; 2) goal difference; 3) number of goals scored.
(C) Champions; (P) Promoted

==== Results summary ====
Overall								Home						Away					
Pld	W	D	L	GF	GA	GD	Pts	W	D	L	GF	GA	GD	W	D	L	GF	GA	GD
38	18	10	10	65	44	+21	64	11	5	3	33	16	+17	7	5	7	32	28	+4

Source: Ligue 1

==== Results by round ====
Round	1	2	3	4	5	6	7	8	9	10	11	12	13	14	15	16	17	18	19	20	21	22	23	24	25	26	27	28	29	30	31	32	33	34	35	36	37	38
Ground	H	A	H	A	H	A	H	A	H	A	A	H	A	H	A	H	A	H	A	H	A	H	A	H	A	H	A	H	H	A	H	A	H	A	H	A	H	A
Result	W	W	W	L	L	L	W	D	W	L	W	L	L	W	L	D	W	D	L	W	W	D	L	W	D	W	D	D	D	D	W	W	W	W	W	W	L	D
Position	2	1	1	3	6	7	3	5	3	7	5	7	8	5	8	9	7	8	8	7	5	8	8	7	7	4	5	6	6	6	4	3	3	3	2	2	2	3

Source: Ligue 2
A = Away; H = Home; W = Win; D = Draw; L = Loss

==== Matches ====
2 August 2013 1	Caen	3–1	Dijon	Caen
--:-- CEST (UTC+2)				Stadium: Stade Michel d'Ornano

9 August 2013 2	Laval	1–2	Caen	Laval
--:-- CEST (UTC+2)				Stadium: Stade Francis Le Basser

16 August 2013 3	Caen	3–0	Créteil	Caen
--:-- CEST (UTC+2)				Stadium: Stade Michel d'Ornano

23 August 2013 4	Troyes	2–1	Caen	Troyes
--:-- CEST (UTC+2)				Stadium: Stade de l'Aube

2 September 2013 5	Caen	0–2	Metz	Caen
--:-- CEST (UTC+2)				Stadium: Stade Michel d'Ornano

13 September 2013 6	Arles-Avignon	3–2	Caen	Avignon
--:-- CEST (UTC+2)				Stadium: Parc des Sports

20 September 2013 7	Caen	3–1	Niort	Caen
--:-- CEST (UTC+2)				Stadium: Stade Michel d'Ornano

24 September 2013 8	Clermont	2–2	Caen	Clermont-Ferrand
--:-- CEST (UTC+2)				Stadium: Stade Gabriel Montpied

27 September 2013 9	Caen	1–0	Le Havre	Caen
20:00 CEST (UTC+2)	Fajr 84' (pen.)			Stadium: Stade Michel d'Ornano; Referee: Johan Hamel

4 October 2013 10	Nîmes	2–1	Caen	Nîmes
--:-- CEST (UTC+2)				Stadium: Stade des Costières

18 October 2013 11	Châteauroux	0–2	Caen	Châteauroux
--:-- CEST (UTC+2)				Stadium: Stade Gaston Petit

26 October 2013 12	Caen	1–2	Nancy	Caen
--:-- CEST (UTC+2)				Stadium: Stade Michel d'Ornano

2 November 2013 13	Lens	2–1	Caen	Lens
--:-- CET (UTC+1)				Stadium: Stade Bollaert-Delelis

8 November 2013 14	Caen	4–0	Istres	Caen
--:-- CEST (UTC+2)				Stadium: Stade Michel d'Ornano

25 November 2013 15	Auxerre	3–2	Caen	Auxerre
--:-- CET (UTC+1)				Stadium: Stade de l'Abbé-Deschamps

29 November 2013 16	Caen	1–1	Angers	Caen
--:-- CEST (UTC+2)				Stadium: Stade Michel d'Ornano

13 December 2013 17	CA Bastia	1–5	Caen	Bastia
20:00 CET (UTC+1)				Stadium: Stade Armand Cesari; Referee: Alexandre Perreau Niel

20 December 2013 18	Caen	0–0	Brest	Caen
--:-- CEST (UTC+2)				Stadium: Stade Michel d'Ornano

10 January 2014 19	Tours	2–1	Caen	Tours
--:-- CET (UTC+1)				Stadium: Stade de la Vallée du Cher

17 January 2014 20	Caen	2–1	Laval	Caen
--:-- CEST (UTC+2)				Stadium: Stade Michel d'Ornano

24 January 2014 21	Créteil	1–2	Caen	Créteil
--:-- CET (UTC+1)				Stadium: Stade Dominique Duvauchelle

31 January 2014 22	Caen	1–1	Troyes	Caen
--:-- CEST (UTC+2)				Stadium: Stade Michel d'Ornano

7 February 2014 23	Metz	2–1	Caen	Metz
--:-- CET (UTC+1)				Stadium: Stade Saint-Symphorien

14 February 2014 24	Caen	1–0	Arles-Avignon	Caen
--:-- CEST (UTC+2)				Stadium: Stade Michel d'Ornano

21 February 2014 25	Niort	0–0	Caen	Niort
--:-- CET (UTC+1)				Stadium: Stade René Gaillard

28 February 2014 26	Caen	2–1	Clermont	Caen
--:-- CEST (UTC+2)				Stadium: Stade Michel d'Ornano

7 March 2014 27	Le Havre	1–1	Caen	Le Havre
--:-- CET (UTC+1)				Stadium: Stade Océane

21 March 2014 29	Caen	1–1	Châteauroux	Caen
--:-- CET (UTC+1)				Stadium: Stade Michel d'Ornano

28 March 2014 30	Nancy	1–1	Caen	Tomblaine
--:-- CET (UTC+1)				Stadium: Stade Marcel Picot

5 April 2014 31	Caen	1–0	Lens	Caen
--:-- CEST (UTC+2)				Stadium: Stade Michel d'Ornano

11 April 2014 32	Istres	2–3	Caen	Istres
--:-- CEST (UTC+2)				Stadium: Stade Parsemain

19 April 2014 33	Caen	1–0	Auxerre	Caen
--:-- CEST (UTC+2)				Stadium: Stade Michel d'Ornano

28 April 2014 34	Angers	1–2	Caen	Angers
--:-- CEST (UTC+2)				Stadium: Stade Raymond Kopa

2 May 2014 35	Caen	6–1	CA Bastia	Caen
--:-- CEST (UTC+2)				Stadium: Stade Michel d'Ornano

5 May 2014 36	Brest	0–1	Caen	Brest
--:-- CEST (UTC+2)				Stadium: Stade Francis-Le Blé

9 May 2014 37	Caen	1–3	Tours	Caen
20:30 CEST (UTC+2)	Kodjia 70'	Report	Santamaria 11'; Delort 50' (pen.); Ketkeophomphone 89'	Stadium: Stade Michel d'Ornano; Referee: Amaury Delerue

13 May 2014 28	Caen	1–1	Nîmes	Caen
20:00 CEST (UTC+2)	Duhamel 20'	Report	Benmeziane 35'	Stadium: Stade Michel d'Ornano; Referee: Bartolomeu Varela

16 May 2014 38	Dijon	2–2	Caen	Dijon
20:30 CEST (UTC+2)	Philippoteaux 16' (pen.); Cissé 50'	Report	Duhamel 44'; Pierre 65'	Stadium: Stade Gaston Gérard; Referee: Hakim Ben El Hadj

=== Coupe de France ===
4 January 2014 Round of 64	CA Pontarlier	1–3	Caen	Pontarlier
14:30 CET (UTC+1)	Letellier 69'	Report	Kanté 6'; Fajr 48'; Nangis 90'	Stadium: Stade Paul Robbe; Attendance: 3,500; Referee: Hakim Ben El Hadj

21 January 2014 Round of 32	Ajaccio	0–2	Caen	Ajaccio
18:00 CET (UTC+1)		Report	Autret 63'; Fajr 74'	Stadium: Stade François Coty; Attendance: 1,500; Referee: Saïd Ennjimi

11 February 2014 Round of 16	Lille	3–3 (a.e.t.) (6–5 p)	Caen	Villeneuve d'Ascq
20:45 CET (UTC+1)	Rodelin 33'; Delaplace 77'; Roux 83'	Report	Koita 14', 29'; Rodelin 90+3' (o.g.)	Stadium: Stade Pierre-Mauroy; Attendance: 11,000; Referee: Lionel Jaffredo
	Penalties
	Baša (penalty scored); Balmont (penalty scored); Origi (penalty scored); Rodelin (penalty scored); Sidibé (penalty scored); Rozehnal (penalty scored)		Saad (penalty scored); Duhamel (penalty scored); Calvé (penalty scored); Appiah (penalty scored); Kodjia (penalty scored); Autret (penalty missed)

=== Coupe de la Ligue ===
6 August 2013 First round	Caen	2–0	Metz	Caen
20:00 CEST (UTC+2)	Kodjia 5', 35'			Stadium: Stade Michel d'Ornano; Attendance: 5,186; Referee: Alexandre Castro

27 August 2013 Second round	Caen	0–3	Auxerre	Caen
18:45 CEST (UTC+2)			Ntep 30'; Coulibaly 76'; Sammaritano 90+2'	Stadium: Stade Michel d'Ornano; Attendance: 6,298; Referee: Benoît Millot

== Statistics ==
=== Goalscorers ===
Rank	Pos.	No.	Player	Ligue 2	Coupe de France	Coupe de la Ligue	Total
1	FW	7	(France) Mathieu Duhamel	24	0	0	24
2	MF	10	(Morocco) Fayçal Fajr	8	2	0	10
3	FW	9	(Ivory Coast) Jonathan Kodjia	5	0	2	7
4	MF		(France) Mathias Autret	5	1	0	6
Total				65	8	2	75
