= Perquis =

Perquis is a French surname. Notable people with the surname include:

- Damien Perquis (born 1984), French-Polish football defender
- Damien Perquis (footballer, born 1986), French football goalkeeper
