= Paul Reulet =

French footballer (born 1994)

Personal information
- Full name: Paul Reulet
- Date of birth: 14 January 1994 (age 32)
- Place of birth: Caen, France
- Height: 1.81 m (5 ft 11 in)
- Position: Goalkeeper

Team information
- Current team: US Granville
- Number: 30

Youth career
- 1999–2000: Ent S Val Normand
- 2000–2003: FC Entre Orne et Odon
- 2003–2016: Caen

Senior career*
Years	Team	Apps	(Gls)
2010–2019	Caen II	79	(0)
2016–2019	Caen	3	(0)
2017–2018	→ Boulogne (loan)	30	(0)
2020–2025	US Granville	110	(0)

International career
2012	France U18	1	(0)
- * Club domestic league appearances and goals as of 21:30, 17 May 2025 (UTC)

Paul Reulet (born 14 January 1994) is a French professional footballer who plays as a goalkeeper for US Granville.

Reulet is a youth international for France.

== Career statistics ==
As of match played 17 May 2025

Appearances and goals by club, season and competition
Club	Season	League			National cup		League cup		Total	
Club	Season	Division	Apps	Goals	Apps	Goals	Apps	Goals	Apps	Goals
Caen II	2010–11	CFA	8	0	—		—		2	0
Caen II	2011–12	CFA	1	0	—		—		1	0
Caen II	2012–13	CFA	9	0	—		—		4	0
Caen II	2013–14	CFA 2	18	0	—		—		13	0
Caen II	2014–15	CFA 2	16	0	—		—		16	0
Caen II	2015–16	CFA 2	9	0	—		—		9	0
Caen II	2016–17	CFA 2	16	0	—		—		16	0
Caen II	2018–19	Championnat National 3	2	0	—		—		2	0
Caen II	Total		79	0	—		—		79	0
Caen	2012–13	Ligue 2	0	0	0	0	0	0	0	0
Caen	2013–14	Ligue 2	0	0	0	0	0	0	0	0
Caen	2015–16	Ligue 1	0	0	0	0	1	0	1	0
Caen	2016–17	Ligue 1	3	0	0	0	1	0	4	0
Caen	2017–18	Ligue 1	—		0	0	—		0	0
Caen	Total		3	0	0	0	2	0	5	0
Boulogne (loan)	2017–18	Championnat National	30	0	—		—		30	0
US Granville	2020–21	Championnat National 2	9	0	—		—		9	0
US Granville	2021–22	Championnat National 2	16	0	—		—		16	0
US Granville	2022–23	Championnat National 2	30	0	3	0	—		33	0
US Granville	2023–24	Championnat National 2	25	0	—		—		25	0
US Granville	2024–25	Championnat National 2	30	0	—		—		30	0
US Granville	Total		110	0	3	0	—		113	0
Career total			222	0	3	0	2	0	227	0
