= Fayçal Fajr =

Footballer (born 1988)

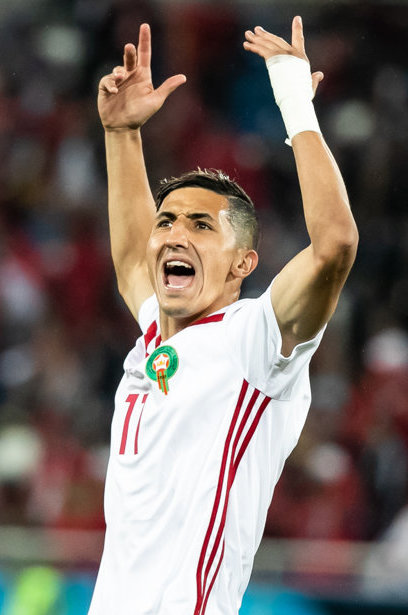
- Fajr with Morocco at the 2018 FIFA World Cup

Personal information
- Full name: Fayçal Fajr
- Date of birth: 1 August 1988 (age 38)
- Place of birth: Rouen, France
- Height: 1.78 m (5 ft 10 in)
- Position: Attacking midfielder

Team information
- Current team: MA Tétouan
- Number: 99

Youth career
- 1994–2000: Sotteville-Lès-Rouen
- 2000–2003: Le Havre
- 2003–2005: Rouen
- 2005–2006: Oissel

Senior career*
Years	Team	Apps	(Gls)
2006–2008	Oissel	20	(4)
2008–2011	Fréjus Saint-Raphaël	91	(12)
2011–2014	Caen	78	(11)
2014–2016	Elche	34	(1)
2015–2016	→ Deportivo La Coruña (loan)	38	(5)
2016–2017	Deportivo La Coruña	24	(0)
2017–2018	Getafe	31	(1)
2018–2019	Caen	36	(5)
2019–2020	Getafe	10	(0)
2020–2022	Sivasspor	65	(9)
2022–2024	Al-Wehda	60	(7)
2024–2025	Al-Taawoun	30	(0)
2025–2026	Al-Jubail	30	(3)
2026–	MA Tétouan	0	(0)

International career^{‡}
2015–2022	Morocco	49	(4)
- * Club domestic league appearances and goals as of 07:29, 13 September 2026 (UTC) ‡ National team caps and goals as of 05:11, 21 November 2022 (UTC)

Fayçal Fajr (Arabic: فيصل فجر, Berber languages: ⴼⴰⵢⵚⴰⵍ ⴼⴰⵊⵔ; born 1 August 1988) is a professional footballer who plays as an attacking midfielder for MA Tétouan. Born in France, he plays for the Morocco national team.

== Career ==
=== Early career ===
Fajr was born in the city of Rouen and began his career with local amateur club Sottevillais Cheminots. In 2000, he joined the youth academy of professional club Le Havre. After three years, Fajr was released after being told he lacked the physical requirements to remain. He, subsequently, returned home to join hometown club Rouen. Fajr spent two years at the club and, in 2005, signed a contract with CMS Oissel. With Oissel, he played in the Championnat de France amateur 2, the fifth division of French football.

After two seasons playing on the senior team of Oissel, in 2008, Fajr moved up one division to sign with Étoile Fréjus Saint-Raphaël, then known as ES Fréjus. In his first season with the club, he appeared in 29 matches scoring four goals. Fréjus finished second in its group, however, due to the Direction Nationale du Contrôle de Gestion (National Directorate of Management Control) (DNCG) imposing sanctions on several clubs in the Championnat National, the club was given a spot in the third division. After playing mainly as a substitute in his inaugural season with the club, Fajr became a starter in the club's first season in National. He appeared in 29 league matches as Fréjus finished mid-table. In his final season with the club, Fajr became the club's primary play-maker. He posted career-highs in appearances (34) and goals (8). Fréjus finished the campaign in sixth place.

=== Caen ===
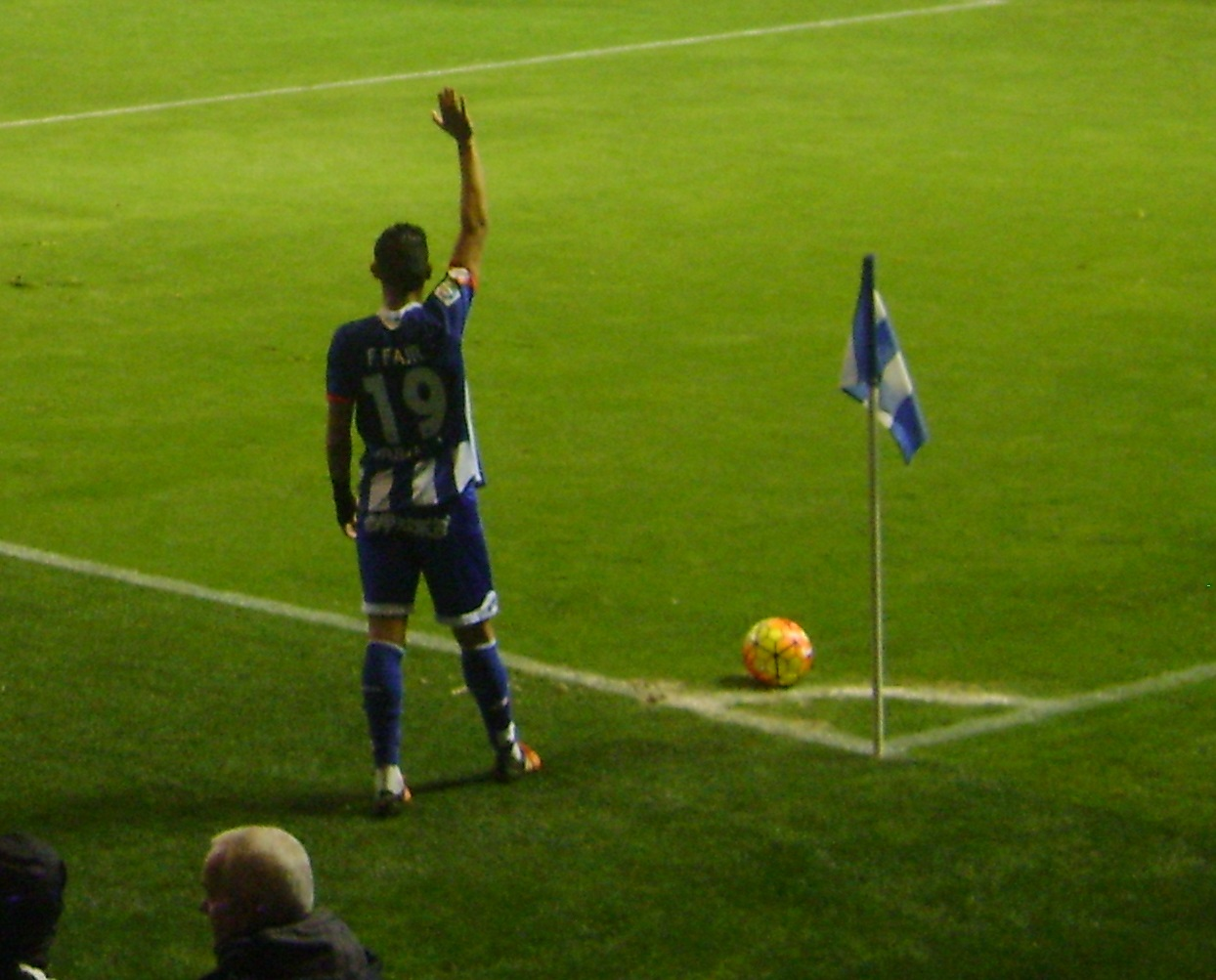
Fayçal Fajr playing for Deportivo de La Coruña.

After a successful campaign with Fréjus, Fajr was linked to several professional clubs, most notably Nice, Dijon, Lens, and Reims. On 18 July 2011, it was confirmed that he would be joining Ligue 1 club Caen on a three-year contract. The transfer was completed the following day. Fajr was assigned the number 29 shirt and simultaneously made his professional and club debut on 28 August in a league match against Rennes. Three days later, in a Coupe de la Ligue match against Brest, he scored his first goal for Caen in a 3–2 victory. Caen were relegated to the Ligue 2 in his first season, but he helped them back up two seasons later. In the 2013–14 season, he scored 8 league goals in 35 games and Caen were promoted to the top-flight Ligue 1.

=== Spain ===
On 24 June 2014, Fajr passed his medical and completed the move to the La Liga side Elche. He made his debut in the category on 24 August, coming on as a substitute for Ferrán Corominas in a 0–3 away loss against FC Barcelona.

On 6 August 2015 Fajr was loaned to fellow league team Deportivo de La Coruña, for one year. Ahead of the 2016–17 campaign, he signed a permanent contract with the club.

On 20 July 2017, Fajr signed a two-year deal with Getafe CF, still in the first division.

=== Later career ===
On 3 August 2018, Fajr returned to his former club Caen. A year later, he went back to Getafe.

On 14 September 2020, Fajr signed a two-year deal with Turkish Süper Lig side Sivasspor.

On 19 June 2022, Fajr joined Saudi Arabian club Al-Wehda. On 20 August 2024, Fajr joined Al-Taawoun on a free transfer. On 23 September 2025, Fajr joined Al-Jubail.

== International career ==
Born and raised in France, Fajr holds both French and Moroccan nationalities.

He made his senior debut for the Morocco national football team in a 2018 World Cup qualifying game against Equatorial Guinea in a 1–0 loss.

In May 2018 he was named in Morocco's 23-man squad for the 2018 FIFA World Cup in Russia. Morocco's national football team played against Iran, Portugal, and Spain in the group stage. During Morocco's match against Spain, Fajr made the corner kick that led to Youssef En-Nesyri's goal with nine minutes remaining.

== Career statistics ==
=== Club ===
As of match played on 11 March 2025

Club statistics
Club	Season	League			National cup (Note: Includes Coupe de France, Copa del Rey, Turkish Cup, King s Cup)		League cup (Note: Includes Coupe de la Ligue)		Continental		Other		Total	
Club	Season	Division	Apps	Goals	Apps	Goals	Apps	Goals	Apps	Goals	Apps	Goals	Apps	Goals
Fréjus	2009–10	Championnat National	30	1	0	0	—		—		—		30	1
Fréjus	2010–11	Championnat National	32	7	2	0	—		—		—		34	7
Fréjus	Total		62	8	2	0	—		—		—		64	8
Caen Reserves	2011–12	CFA	13	7	—		—		—		—		13	7
Caen Reserves	2012–13	CFA	1	0	—		—		—		—		1	0
Caen Reserves	Total		14	7	—		—		—		—		14	7
Caen	2011–12	Ligue 1	13	0	1	1	3	0	—		—		17	1
Caen	2012–13	Ligue 2	30	3	1	2	3	0	—		—		34	5
Caen	2013–14	Ligue 2	35	8	3	2	1	0	—		—		39	10
Caen	Total		78	11	5	5	7	0	—		—		90	16
Elche	2014–15	La Liga	34	1	4	0	—		—		—		38	1
Deportivo La Coruña (loan)	2015–16	La Liga	38	5	3	0	—		—		—		41	5
Deportivo La Coruña	2016–17	La Liga	24	0	1	0	—		—		—		25	0
Getafe	2017–18	La Liga	31	1	2	0	—		—		—		33	1
Caen	2018–19	Ligue 1	36	5	3	0	1	0	—		—		40	5
Getafe	2019–20	La Liga	10	0	1	0	—		5 (Note: Appearances in UEFA Europa League)	0	—		16	0
Sivasspor	2020–21	Süper Lig	36	4	3	0	—		5	0	—		44	4
Sivasspor	2021–22	Süper Lig	29	5	5	0	—		5 (Note: Appearances in UEFA Europa Conference League)	0	—		39	5
Sivasspor	Total		65	9	8	0	—		10	0	—		83	9
Al-Wehda	2022–23	Saudi Pro League	27	3	4	1	—		—		—		31	4
Al-Wehda	2023–24	Saudi Pro League	33	4	2	0	—		—		—		35	4
Al-Wehda	Total		60	7	6	1	—		—		—		66	8
Al Taawoun	2024–25	Saudi Pro League	22	0	3	0	—		8 (Note: Appearances in AFC Champions League Two)	0	1 (Note: Appearance sun Saudi Super Cup)	0	34	0
Career total			473	54	38	6	8	0	23	0	1	0	544	60

=== International ===
As of match played 12 July 2019

Morocco
Year	Apps	Goals
2015	2	0
2016	6	0
2017	12	2
2018	10	1
2019	4	0
2020	0	0
2021	5	0
2022	8	1
Total	49	4

Scores and results list Morocco's goal tally first.

No	Date	Venue	Opponent	Score	Result	Competition
1.	24 March 2017	Stade de Marrakech, Marrakesh, Morocco	Burkina Faso	1–0	2–0	Friendly
2.	1 September 2017	Prince Moulay Abdellah Stadium, Rabat, Morocco	Mali	5–0	6–0	2018 FIFA World Cup qualification
3.	13 October 2018	Stade Mohammed V, Casablanca, Morocco	Comoros	1–0	1–0	2019 Africa Cup of Nations qualification
4.	13 June 2022	Stade Mohammed V, Casablanca, Morocco	Liberia	1–0	2–0	2023 Africa Cup of Nations qualification

== Honours ==
Sivasspor

- Turkish Cup: 2021–22
