= Ronny Rodelin =

French footballer (born 1989)

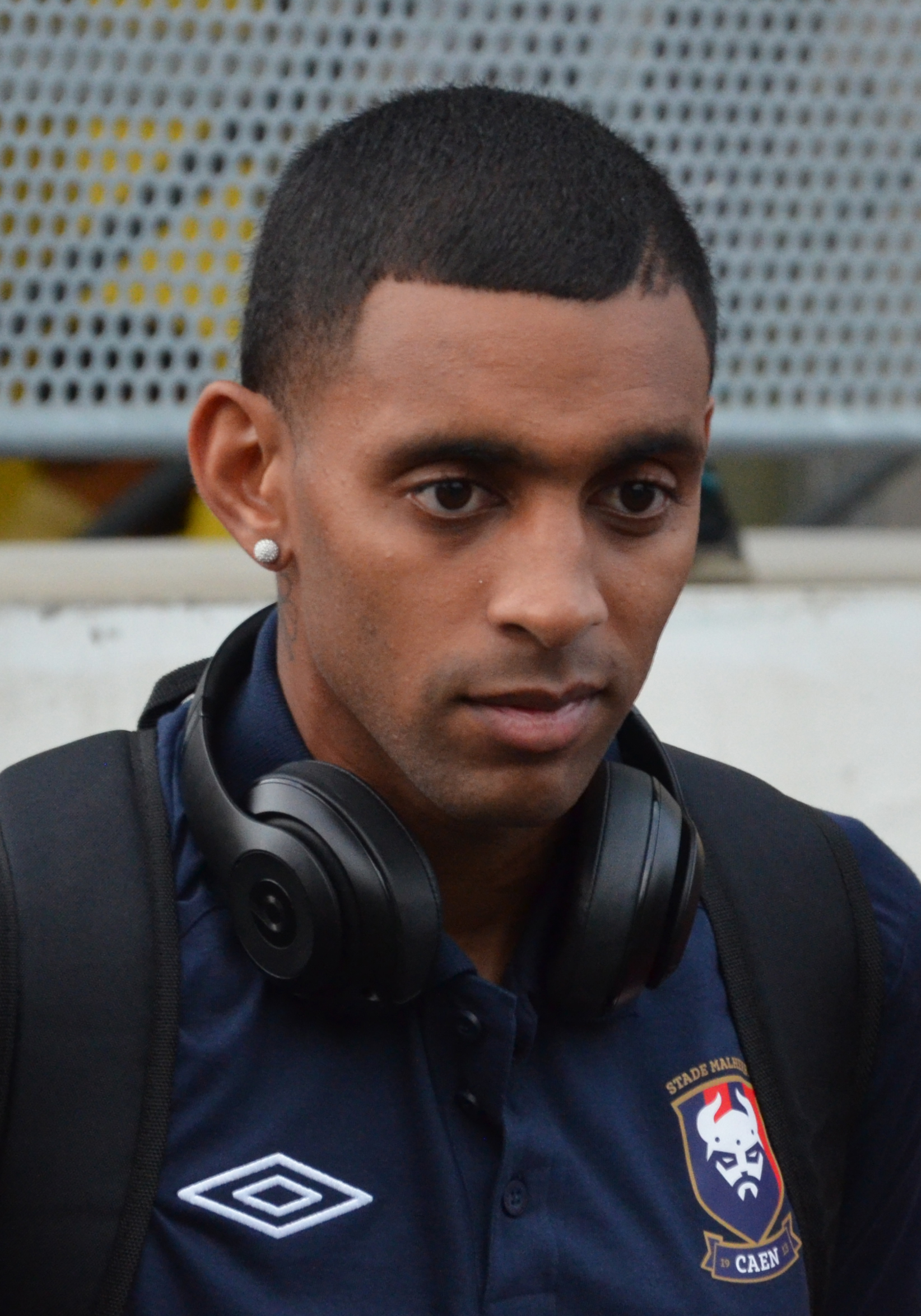
- Rodelin in 2016 with Caen

Personal information
- Full name: Sylvio Ronny Rodelin
- Date of birth: 18 November 1989 (age 36)
- Place of birth: Saint-Denis, Réunion
- Height: 1.92 m (6 ft 4 in)
- Position: Forward

Youth career
- 2004–2007: Rodez

Senior career*
Years	Team	Apps	(Gls)
2007–2008	Rodez	23	(1)
2008–2011	Nantes	25	(5)
2010	→ Troyes (loan)	5	(2)
2011–2016	Lille	78	(5)
2011–2015	Lille B	18	(6)
2015	→ Mouscron-Péruwelz (loan)	12	(3)
2015–2016	→ Caen (loan)	34	(10)
2016–2018	Caen	74	(14)
2018–2021	Guingamp	77	(12)
2021–2024	Servette	63	(6)
2024	→ Perly-Certoux (loan)	0	(0)
- * Club domestic league appearances and goals as of 15 December 2023

Sylvio Ronny Rodelin (born 18 November 1989) is a French professional footballer who plays as a forward.

== Club career ==
=== Early career ===
Rodelin began his youth and senior career at Rodez. During the 2007–08 season, he scored 1 goal in 23 Championnat National matches. In July 2008 he signed for Ligue 1 club Nantes. On 28 January 2010, Championnat National club Troyes signed him on loan from Nantes until the end of the 2009–10 season. He played the 2010–11 season in Ligue 2 with Nantes, making 19 appearances (15 of them in Ligue 2) and scoring 5 goals (all of them scored in Ligue 2) in all competitions.

=== Lille ===
On 13 June 2011, he signed a four-year contract to join Ligue 1 club Lille. On 6 August 2011, he made his competitive debut for Lille, coming on as a substitute for Florent Balmont in the 87th minute in the Ligue 1 away match against AS Nancy which ended in a 1–1 draw.

==== Mouscron-Péruwelz (loan) ====
On 2 February 2015, Rodelin was loaned to Belgian Pro League club Mouscron-Péruwelz.

==== Caen (loan) ====
On 31 August 2015, Rodelin joined Ligue 1 club Stade Malherbe Caen on a year-long loan, with Caen given an option to buy him. On 12 September 2015, he made his competitive debut for Caen, starting in the Ligue 1 away match against Troyes AC which Caen won 3–1. He played in all of Caen's remaining 33 (starting in 32 of them) Ligue 1 matches of the 2015–16 season. He was Caen's second-highest scorer (behind Andy Delort) during the 2015–16 season with 10 goals (all of them scored in Ligue 1) and 2 assists in all competitions.

=== Caen ===
On 26 July 2016, Caen activated the clause to permanently sign Rodelin; he signed a three-year contract with Caen. On 20 May 2017, the last matchday of the 2016–17 Ligue 1 season, Rodelin scored the goal (his 9th and final Ligue 1 goal of the 2016–17 season) that ensured Caen remained in Ligue 1 for the 2017–18 season. With Caen needing a win against 2016–17 Ligue 1 runners-up Paris Saint-Germain to be sure of avoiding relegation, Rodelin had a penalty saved in the second half when Caen was down 1–0 before eventually finding the equalizer a minute into added time; the final score was 1–1.

=== Guingamp ===
In August 2018, Rodelin joined league rivals En Avant de Guingamp.

=== Servette ===
On 6 July 2021, he moved to Servette in Switzerland on a two-year contract. He made his competitive debut on 25 July in a 2–1 league win away over FC Sion, coming on as a substitute for Kastriot Imeri in the 58th minute. His first goal came on 22 August, scoring the final goal of a 4–1 win over FC Luzern, less than 30 seconds after coming off the bench.

== International career ==
Born in Réunion, Rodelin is of Malagasy descent and was approached to join the Madagascar national team in March 2018.

== Honours ==
Guingamp

- Coupe de la Ligue runner-up: 2018–19
