= Jeff Louis =

Haitian footballer (born 1992)

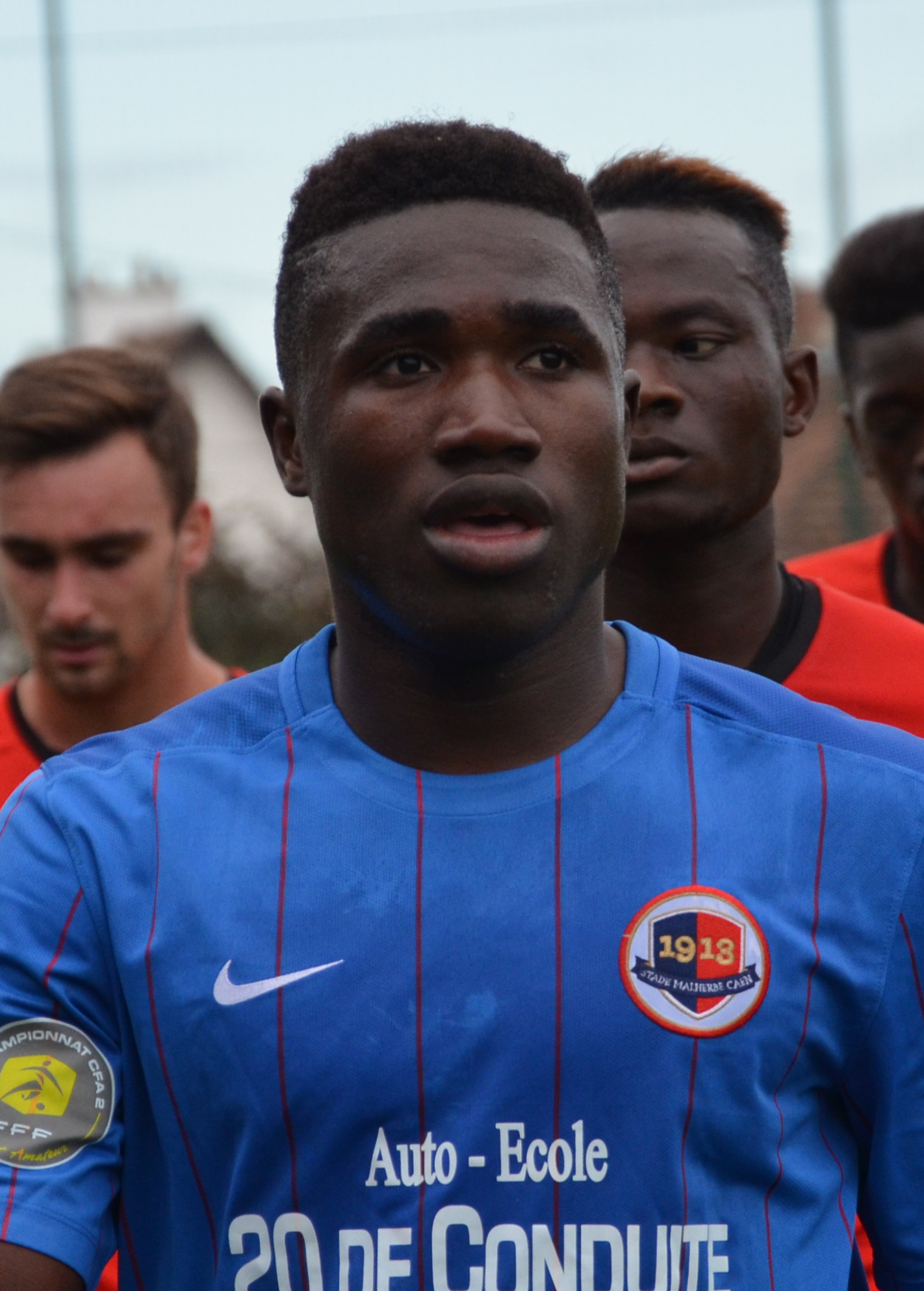
- Louis playing for Stade Malherbe Caen in 2015

Personal information
- Date of birth: 8 August 1992 (age 34)
- Place of birth: Port-au-Prince, Haiti
- Height: 1.71 m (5 ft 7 in)
- Position: Midfielder

Senior career*
Years	Team	Apps	(Gls)
2009	AS Mirebalais		
2010–2012	Le Mans	32	(2)
2010–2012	Le Mans B	19	(1)
2012–2014	Nancy	43	(12)
2012–2014	Nancy B	10	(3)
2014–2015	Standard Liège	27	(3)
2015–2018	Caen	23	(1)
2015	Caen B	13	(3)
2018	→ Quevilly-Rouen (loan)	11	(2)

International career
2011–2018	Haiti	29	(3)
- * Club domestic league appearances and goals

Jeff Louis (born 8 August 1992) is a Haitian former professional footballer who played as a midfielder. Between 2011 and 2018 he represented the Haiti national team internationally, making 29 FIFA-official appearances and scoring 3 goals.

== Club career ==
Louis spent his early career in Haiti and France with AS Mirebalais, Le Mans and Le Mans II. He signed for Nancy in July 2012. In May 2014 he was linked with a transfer to Scottish club Celtic. In August 2014 he signed for Belgian club Standard Liège. In July 2015 he signed with French club Caen. Often injured, he was rarely able to play. In September 2018, he was sentenced to three months in prison for traffic crime. After announcing his intention to end his career because of his knee injuries, he terminated his contract with Caen in November 2018.

== International career ==
Louis made his international debut for the Haitian national football team in 2011, and he has appeared in FIFA World Cup qualifying matches for them.

=== International goals ===
Scores and results list Haiti's goal tally first, score column indicates score after each Louis goal.

List of international goals scored by Jeff Louis
No.	Date	Venue	Opponent	Score	Result	Competition
1.	9 October 2014	Stade Sylvio Cator, Port-au-Prince, Haiti	French Guiana	1–0	2–2	2014 Caribbean Cup
2.	27 March 2015	Helong Stadium, Changsha, China	China	1–0	2–2	Friendly
3.	24 March 2017	Stade Sylvio Cator, Port-au-Prince, Haiti	Nicaragua	1–0	3–1	2017 CONCACAF Gold Cup qualification
4.	24 March 2017	Stade Sylvio Cator, Port-au-Prince, Haiti	Nicaragua	3–0	3–1	2017 CONCACAF Gold Cup qualification
5.	10 September 2018	Stade Sylvio Cator, Port-au-Prince, Haiti	Sint Maarten	13–0	3–0	2019–20 CONCACAF Nations League qualification

== Honors ==
Haiti

- Caribbean Cup bronze medal: 2014
