= Vincent Bessat =

French footballer (born 1985)

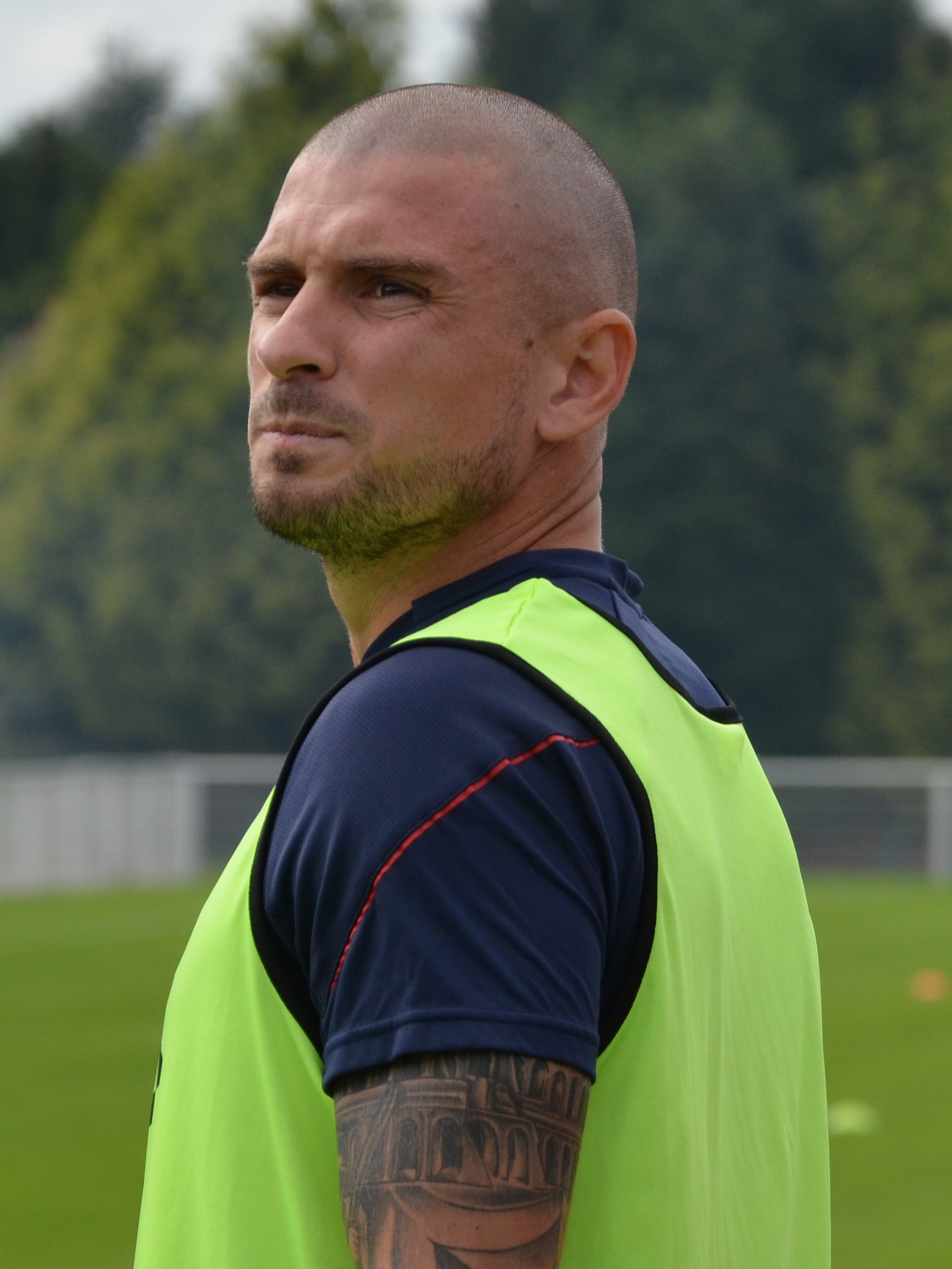

Personal information
- Date of birth: 8 November 1985 (age 40)
- Place of birth: Lyon, France
- Height: 1.78 m (5 ft 10 in)
- Positions: Left-back; left midfielder

Youth career
- Toulouse

Senior career*
Years	Team	Apps	(Gls)
2004–2005	Toulouse B	32	(4)
2005–2007	CS Louhans-Cuiseaux	67	(6)
2007–2010	Metz	73	(8)
2010–2011	Boulogne	30	(1)
2011–2015	Nantes	127	(7)
2014	Nantes B	2	(0)
2015–2018	Caen	96	(1)
2018–2019	Anorthosis Famagusta	23	(2)
2019–2020	Apollon Limassol		
Total		450	(29)
- * Club domestic league appearances and goals

Vincent Bessat (born 8 November 1985) is a French former professional footballer who plays as a left-back.

== Career ==
Born in Lyon, Bessat began his career with Toulouse where he was promoted to the reserve team in summer 2004. After 32 games and 4 goals for the reserves of Toulouse he left the Midi-Pyrénées to sign for Louhans-Cuiseaux. He played two years for Louhans-Cuiseaux and then signed a three years contract with Metz. On 11 June 2010, Boulogne signed the midfielder on a two-year contract from Metz. He played for Nantes from 2011 to 2015, before joining Caen in June 2015.
