= Jordan Nkololo =

Congolese footballer (born 1992)

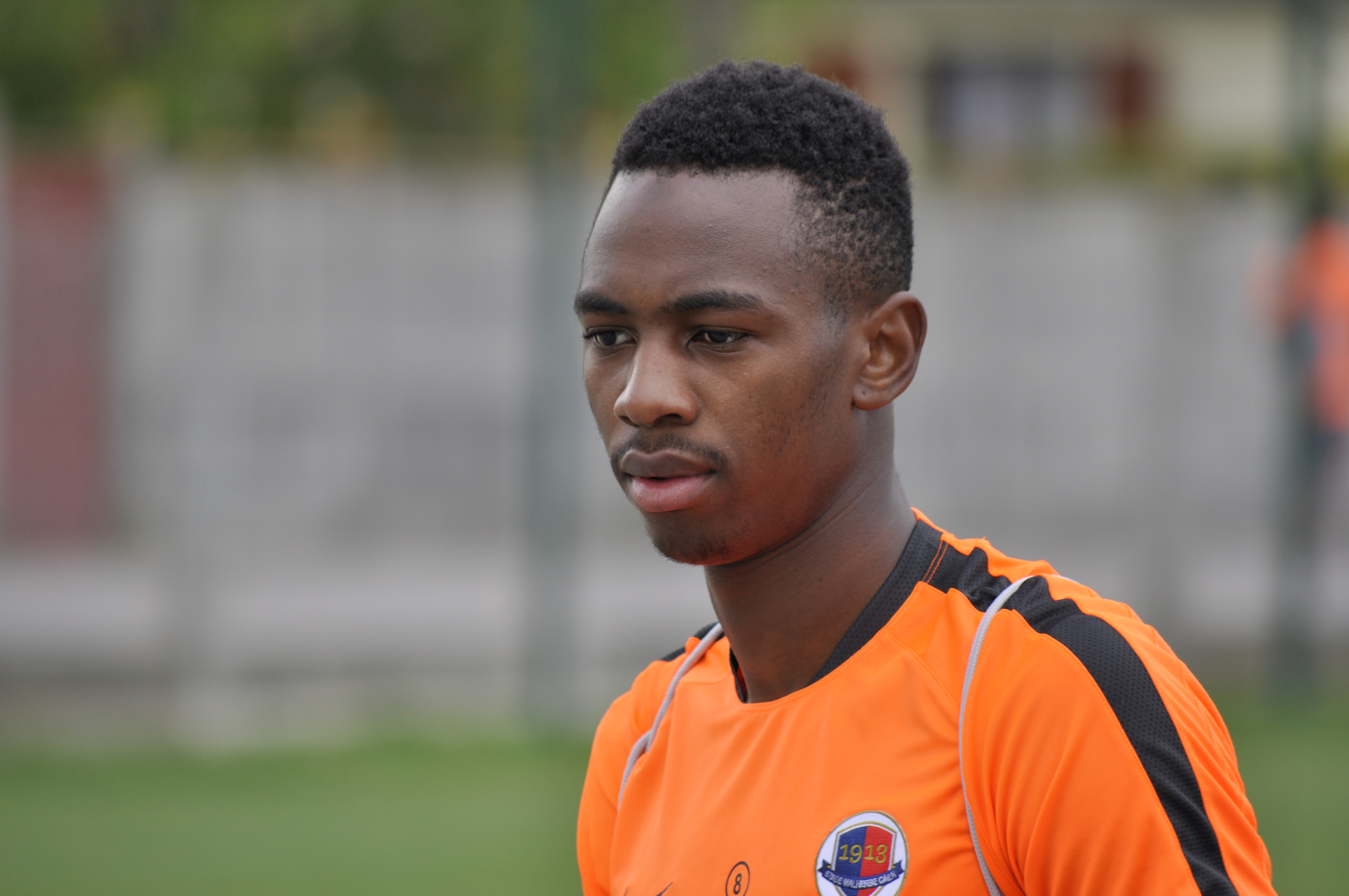

Personal information
- Full name: Michaël Jordan Nkololo
- Date of birth: 9 November 1992 (age 34)
- Place of birth: Créteil, France
- Height: 1.83 m (6 ft 0 in)
- Positions: Attacking midfielder; forward

Team information
- Current team: ÍBV
- Number: 24

Senior career*
Years	Team	Apps	(Gls)
2012–2013	Châteauroux	3	(0)
2012–2013	Châteauroux II	20	(6)
2013–2015	Clermont	50	(2)
2013–2015	Clermont II	9	(3)
2015–2018	Caen	26	(0)
2015–2018	Caen II	22	(5)
2017	→ Laval (loan)	12	(1)
2018	Hermannstadt	16	(1)
2019	Istra 1961	2	(0)
2020	Riga	18	(3)
2021	Volyn Lutsk	6	(1)
2021	Sūduva	16	(7)
2022	Kyzylzhar	15	(1)
2022–2023	Al-Shaeib	12	(1)
2023–	ÍBV	7	(0)

International career^{‡}
2015–	DR Congo	12	(4)
- * Club domestic league appearances and goals as of 10 November 2023 ‡ National team caps and goals as of 20:35, 10 October 2016 (UTC)

Michaël Jordan Nkololo (born 9 November 1992) is a professional footballer who plays as an attacking midfielder and forward for Icelandic club ÍBV. Born in France, he plays for the DR Congo national team.

== Early life ==
Nkololo was born in Créteil, in the southeastern suburbs of Paris, to Zairean parents born in Léopoldville. He acquired French nationality on 28 January 2004, through the collective effect of his parents' naturalization.

== Club career ==
=== Châteauroux ===
Nkololo began his career at Châteauroux and made his debut on 31 August 2012 in the 2–1 defeat away to Guingamp, coming on as a late substitute for Yohan Hautcoeur. He made a total of three league appearances for Châteauroux, whilst making twenty appearances and scoring six goals, including one on his debut against La Flèche RC, for the club's reserve team. He left in 2013.

=== Clermont Foot ===
Nkololo joined Clermont in 2013 and was a first team regular in the 2013–14 season making 32 appearances in the league, scoring once and assisting four times. Nkololo went on trial at Premier League club Aston Villa in January 2015. He departed Clermont in 2015, he participated in fifty Ligue 2 matches for the club across two seasons. He also scored three goals in nine games for Clermont II.

=== Caen ===
He joined Caen ahead of the 2015–16 Ligue 1 season. He played sixteen times in his first season for Caen, as well as five times in Championnat de France Amateur 2 for Caen II. After zero appearances in the first six months of 2016–17, Nkololo left Caen on 17 January 2017 to join Ligue 2 side Laval.

=== Hermannstadt ===
Nkololo played for Romanian side Hermannstadt in 2018, where he scored two goals: one in Liga I against Dinamo București, another one in Cupa României against FC Voluntari.

=== Istra 1961 ===
In February 2019, Nkololo joined Croatian club NK Istra 1961 until June 2020.

=== Riga FC ===
In December 2019, he joined the reigning Latvian champions Riga FC.

=== FK Sūduva ===
In June 2021 Lithuanian FK Sūduva introduced a new member of the club. On 2 August 2021 he scored first goal for the new team in A Lyga against Kauno Žalgiris

=== FC Kyzylzhar ===
In February 2022 he signed with FC Kyzylzhar from Kazakhstan.

=== ÍBV ===
On 16 August 2023, he signed with ÍBV from Iceland.

== International career ==
Nkololo has represented DR Congo at senior level, he has scored two goals in four appearances for his country.

== Personal life ==
Jordan is the brother of the footballer Béni Nkololo.

== Career statistics ==
=== Club ===
As of 4 July 2018.

Club statistics
Club	Season	League			Cup (Note: Includes the Coupe de France.)		League Cup (Note: Includes the Coupe de la Ligue.)		Continental		Other		Total	
Club	Season	Division	Apps	Goals	Apps	Goals	Apps	Goals	Apps	Goals	Apps	Goals	Apps	Goals
Châteauroux	2012–13	Ligue 2	3	0	0	0	0	0	—		0	0	3	0
Châteauroux	Total		3	0	0	0	0	0	—		0	0	3	0
Châteauroux II	2012–13	CFA 2	20	6	—		—		—		0	0	20	6
Châteauroux II	Total		20	6	—		—		—		0	0	20	6
Clermont	2013–14	Ligue 2	32	1	0	0	1	0	—		0	0	33	1
Clermont	2014–15	Ligue 2	18	1	1	0	3	0	—		0	0	22	1
Clermont	Total		50	2	1	0	4	0	—		0	0	55	2
Clermont II	2013–14	CFA 2	2	1	—		—		—		0	0	2	1
Clermont II	2014–15	CFA 2	7	2	—		—		—		0	0	7	2
Clermont II	Total		9	3	—		—		—		0	0	9	3
Caen	2015–16	Ligue 1	16	0	1	0	1	0	—		0	0	18	0
Caen	2016–17	Ligue 1	0	0	0	0	1	0	—		0	0	1	0
Caen	2017–18	Ligue 1	10	0	1	0	2	0	—		0	0	13	0
Caen	Total		26	0	2	0	4	0	—		0	0	32	0
Caen II	2015–16	CFA 2	5	1	—		—		—		0	0	5	1
Caen II	2016–17	CFA 2	7	0	—		—		—		0	0	7	0
Caen II	2017–18	CFA 2	10	4	—		—		—		0	0	10	4
Caen II	Total		22	5	—		—		—		0	0	22	5
Laval (loan)	2016–17	Ligue 2	12	1	—		—		—		0	0	12	1
Career total			142	17	3	0	8	0	—		0	0	153	17

=== International ===
As of 17 January 2017.

National team	Year	Apps	Goals
DR Congo	2015	3	0
DR Congo	2016	1	0
DR Congo	2017	0	0
Total		4	0

=== International goals ===
As of 17 January 2017. Scores and results list DR Congo's goal tally first.

Goal	Date	Venue	Opponent	Score	Result	Competition
1	8 October 2015	Stade de la Cité de l'Oie, Visé, Belgium	Nigeria	2–0	2–0	Friendly
2	15 November 2015	Stade des Martyrs, Kinshasa, DR Congo	Burundi	1–0	3–0 (Note: FIFA awarded DR Congo a 3–0 win as a result of Burundi fielding the ineligible player Gaël Bigirimana. The match originally ended 2–2.)	2018 FIFA World Cup qualification
