= Jordan Adéoti =

Beninese footballer (born 1989)

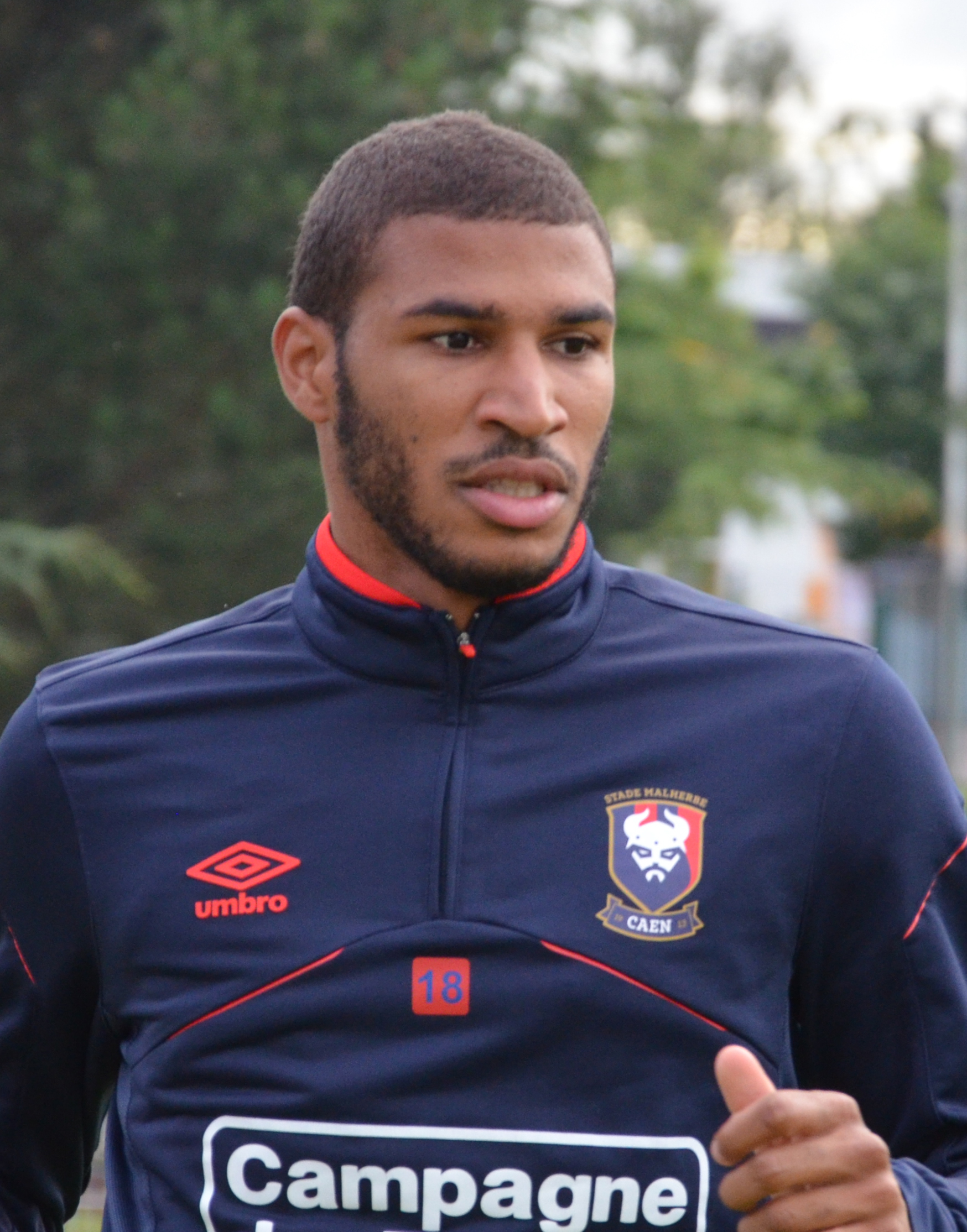
- Adéoti with Caen in 2016

Personal information
- Full name: Jordan Souleymane Adéoti
- Date of birth: 12 March 1989 (age 37)
- Place of birth: L'Union, France
- Height: 1.83 m (6 ft 0 in)
- Position: Defender

Team information
- Current team: Avranches
- Number: 12

Senior career*
Years	Team	Apps	(Gls)
2007–2012	Colomiers	109	(12)
2012–2014	Laval	56	(3)
2014–2017	Caen	87	(0)
2014–2017	Caen B	4	(0)
2017–2020	Auxerre	65	(6)
2019	Auxerre B	1	(0)
2020	Sarpsborg 08	13	(0)
2021	Annecy	13	(1)
2021–2025	Laval	98	(2)
2025–	Avranches	11	(0)

International career^{‡}
2012–	Benin	44	(1)
- * Club domestic league appearances and goals as of 4 December 2025 ‡ National team caps and goals as of 20:51, 8 May 2022 (UTC)

Jordan Souleymane Adéoti (born 12 March 1989) is a professional footballer who plays as a defender for Championnat National 2 club Avranches. Born in France, he represents Benin at international level.

== Club career ==
Adéoti has played in France for Colomiers, Laval and Caen. After three seasons with Caen, he moved on a free transfer to Auxerre in June 2017. In August 2020 he signed for Norwegian club Sarpsborg 08. In January 2021 he returned to France with Annecy. In July 2021, he returned to Laval.

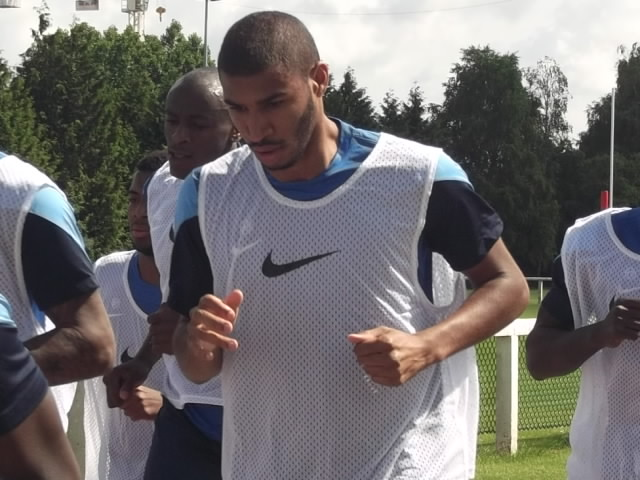
Adéoti with Caen in 2014.

He signed for Avranches in July 2025.

== International career ==
Adéoti made his international debut for Benin in 2012. He represented them at the 2019 Africa Cup of Nations, where the team reached the quarter-finals.

== Career statistics ==
=== Club ===
As of match played 6 May 2022

Appearances and goals by club, season and competition
Club	Season	League			National Cup		League Cup		Other		Total	
Club	Season	Division	Apps	Goals	Apps	Goals	Apps	Goals	Apps	Goals	Apps	Goals
Colomiers	2010–11	CFA	32	2	1	0	—		—		33	2
Colomiers	2011–12	CFA	30	6	0	0	—		—		30	6
Colomiers	Total		62	8	1	0	—		—		63	8
Laval	2012–13	Ligue 2	21	1	0	0	1	0	—		22	1
Laval	2013–14	Ligue 2	35	2	1	0	1	0	—		37	2
Laval	Total		56	3	1	0	2	0	—		59	3
Caen B	2014–15	CFA 2	1	0	—		—		—		1	0
Caen B	2015–16	CFA 2	1	0	—		—		—		1	0
Caen B	2016–17	CFA 2	2	0	—		—		—		2	0
Caen B	Total		4	0	—		—		—		4	0
Caen	2014–15	Ligue 1	28	0	1	1	1	0	—		30	1
Caen	2015–16	Ligue 1	32	0	1	0	1	0	—		34	0
Caen	2016–17	Ligue 1	27	0	2	0	1	0	—		30	0
Caen	Total		87	0	4	1	3	0	—		94	1
Auxerre	2017–18	Ligue 2	34	3	3	0	1	0	—		38	3
Auxerre	2018–19	Ligue 2	25	3	0	0	3	0	—		28	3
Auxerre	2019–20	Ligue 2	6	0	1	0	0	0	—		7	0
Auxerre	Total		65	6	4	0	4	0	—		73	6
Auxerre B	2018–19	National 3	1	0	—		—		—		1	0
Sarpsborg 08	2020	Eliteserien	13	0	0	0	—		—		13	0
Annecy	2020–21	National	13	1	3	0	—		—		16	1
Laval	2021–22	National	31	0	2	0	—		—		33	0
Career totals			332	18	15	1	9	0	0	0	356	19

=== International ===
As of matches played on 11 October 2020

Benin national team
Year	Apps	Goals
2012	4	0
2013	3	0
2014	2	0
2015	2	0
2016	4	0
2017	2	0
2018	4	0
2019	13	0
2020	1	0
Total	35	0

== Honours ==
Laval

- Championnat National: 2021–22
