= Alaeddine Yahia =

Tunisian footballer (born 1981)

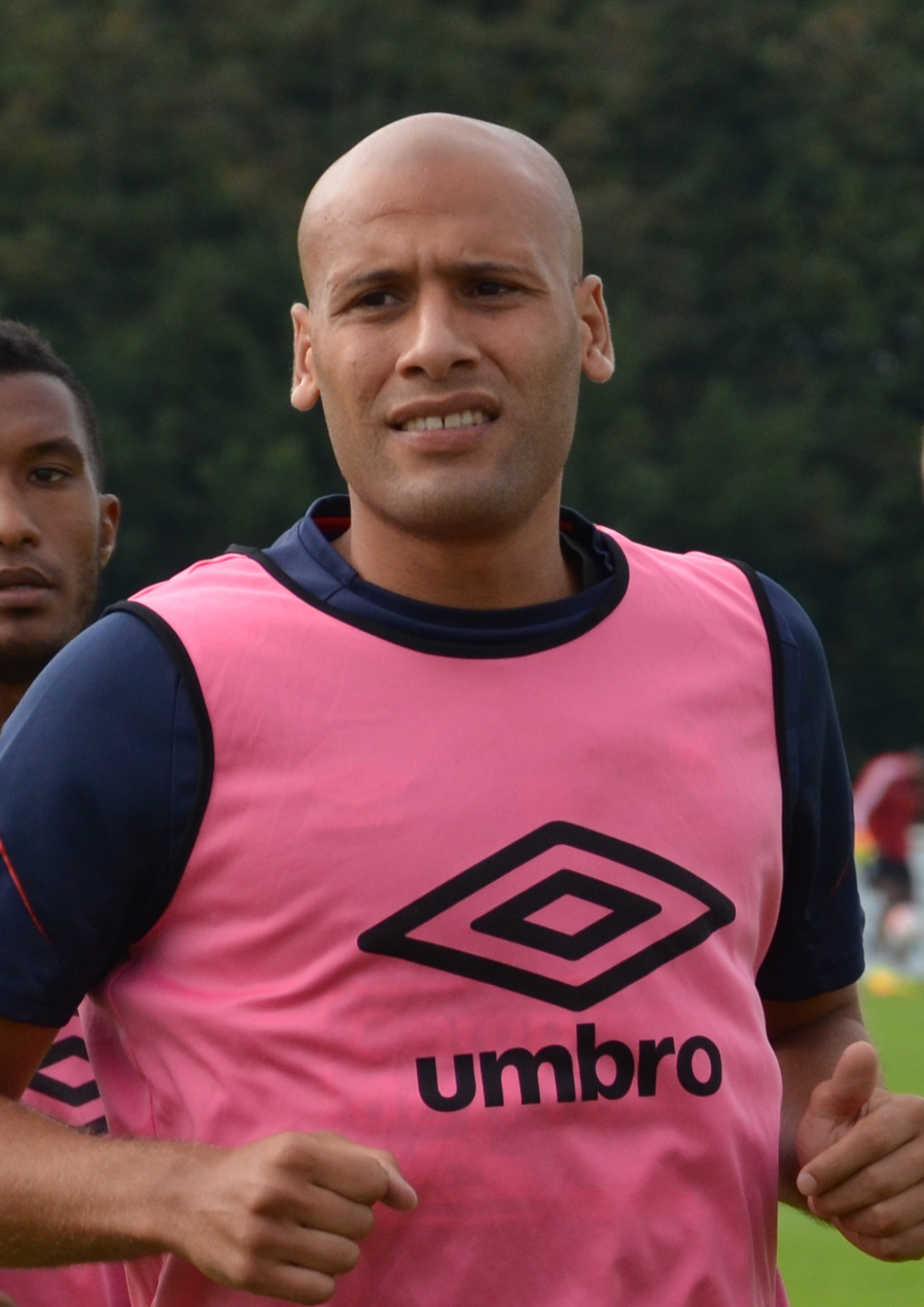
- Yahia in 2016 with Caen

Personal information
- Date of birth: 26 September 1981 (age 45)
- Place of birth: Colombes, Hauts-de-Seine, France
- Height: 1.86 m (6 ft 1 in)
- Position: Centre-back

Senior career*
| Years | Team | Apps | (Gls) |
| 2000–2001 | Louhans-Cuiseaux | 4 | (0) |
| 2001–2004 | Guingamp | 37 | (1) |
| 2004–2005 | Southampton | 0 | (0) |
| 2005 | → Saint-Etienne (loan) | 7 | (0) |
| 2005–2006 | Saint-Etienne | 10 | (0) |
| 2006–2007 | Sedan | 20 | (0) |
| 2008–2009 | Nice | 9 | (1) |
| 2008–2009 | → Lens (loan) | 23 | (3) |
| 2009–2014 | Lens | 154 | (11) |
| 2013 | Lens II | 1 | (0) |
| 2014–2017 | Caen | 75 | (4) |
| 2014 | Caen II | 1 | (0) |
| 2017–2018 | Nancy | 20 | (0) |
| 2017 | Nancy II | 1 | (0) |
| Total | | 352 | (20) |

International career
| 2002–2014 | Tunisia | 25 | (1) |
Medal record
Men's football
Representing Tunisia
Africa Cup of Nations
| Winner | 2004 Tunisia |
- * Club domestic league appearances and goals

Alaeddine Yahia (Arabic: علاء الدين يحيى; born 26 September 1981) is a Tunisian former professional footballer who played as a centre-back.

Yahia has previously played for Stade Tunisien, Guingamp and had a brief spell at Southampton, although he did not play a first team game for the club.

Yahia was part of the Tunisian 2004 Olympic football team, who exited in the first round, finishing third in group C, behind group and gold medal winners Argentina and group runners-up Australia. He was part of the squad that won the 2004 African Cup of Nations.

On 24 February 2007, Yahia played his first Ligue 1 match for Sedan against Rennes.

== Honours ==
Tunisia

- Africa Cup of Nations: 2004
