= Emmanuel Imorou =

Beninese footballer (born 1988)

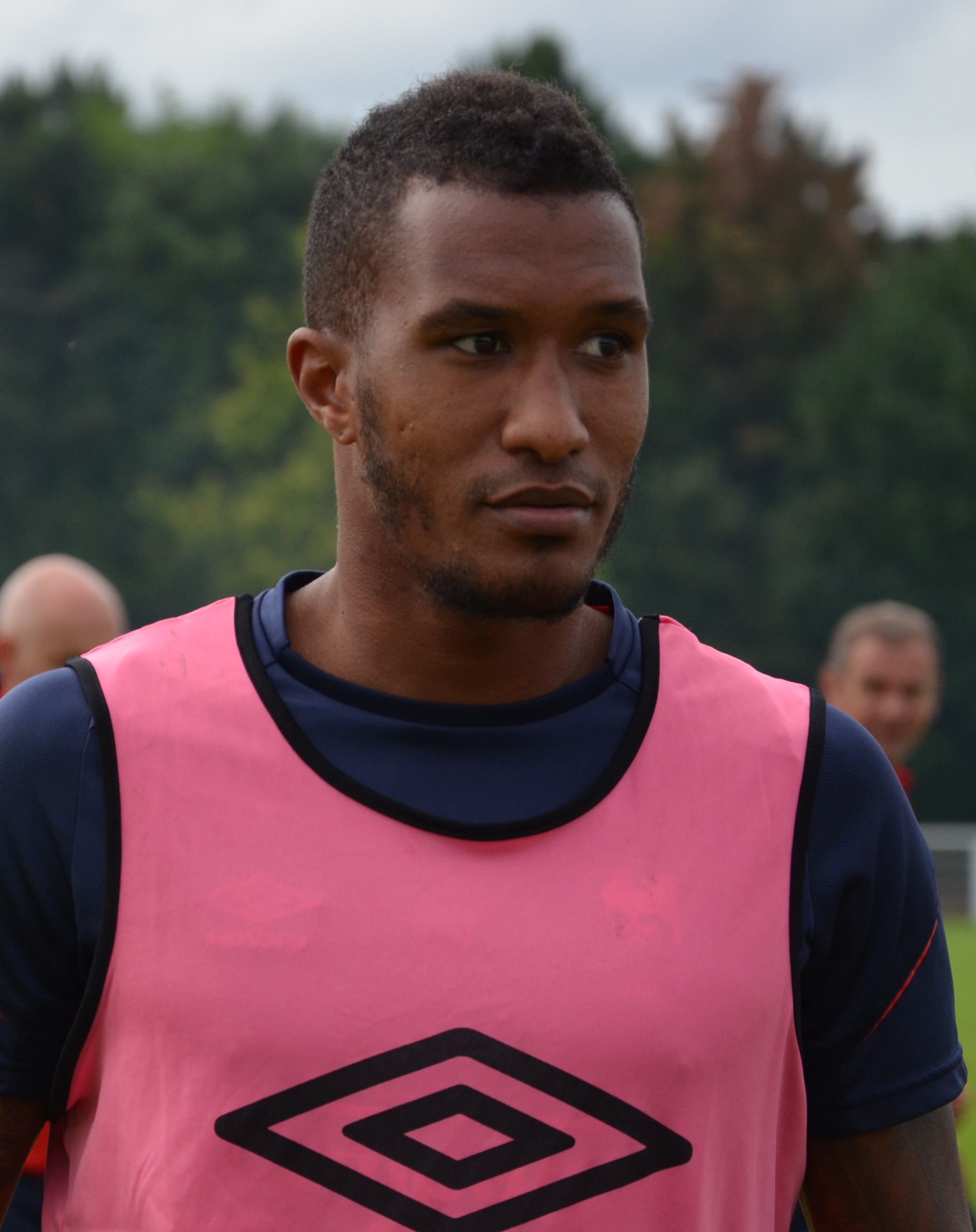
- Imorou with in 2016

Personal information
- Full name: Emmanuel Philippe Imorou
- Date of birth: 16 September 1988 (age 38)
- Place of birth: Bourges, France
- Height: 1.81 m (5 ft 11 in)
- Position: Left-back

Youth career
- 2004–2005: Bourges

Senior career*
Years	Team	Apps	(Gls)
2005–2007	Châteauroux B		
2007–2011	Châteauroux	36	(0)
2009–2010	→ Gueugnon (loan)	22	(1)
2011–2012	Braga	3	(0)
2012–2014	Clermont	62	(1)
2012	Clermont B	2	(0)
2014–2019	Caen	71	(1)
2014–2019	Caen B	11	(0)
2017–2018	→ Cercle Brugge (loan)	14	(0)
2019–2021	Thonon Evian	1+ (Note: Statistics are missing for the 2019–20 season.)	(0+)
Total		222+	(3+)

International career^{‡}
2010–2021	Benin	20	(0)
- * Club domestic league appearances and goals ‡ National team caps and goals as of 10:48, 16 August 2020 (UTC)

Emmanuel Philippe Imorou (born 16 September 1988) is a former professional footballer who played as a left-back. Born in France, he played for the Benin national team.

== Club career ==
Imorou began his career in 2004 with Bourges, before joining the reserve team from Châteauroux in 2005. In 2007, he was promoted to the senior side. After two seasons of being rarely used, he was loaned out to the Championnat National club Gueugnon. At Gueugnon, he played non-league games and returned to Châteauroux for the 2010–11 season. For Imorou, that season was undoubtedly the most successful. Following this, he attracted much interest from clubs in France and abroad.

In the summer of 2011, he joined Primeira Liga team Braga on an undisclosed fee on a five-year contract. He was signed to fill in the gap in the full-back position left by Sílvio, who was sold to Atlético Madrid for €8 million. At Braga, his playing time was hampered by injuries, as well as a lack of playing time. He managed to play five games in the whole season and was mainly used as a backup in the full-back positions to Miguel Lopes and Uwa Elderson Echiéjilé. After a year with Braga, he left the club and signed for French side Clermont Foot of Ligue 2 in the summer of 2012 on a free transfer. On 24 June 2014, he joined the newly promoted Ligue 1 side Caen, ending a two-year career as a Clermont player. On 22 September 2019, Imorou signed a contract with French club Thonon Evian.

== International career ==
Imorou was born in France to Beninese parents, which grants him the right to play for the Benin national team. He was called up the national side for the very first time 2010 to be a part of the squad which would play at the 2010 Africa Cup of Nations.

He was called up by Michel Dussuyer, who gave him his debut as a player against Mozambique during the group stage phase, where he came on as a substitute for Félicien Singbo. His nation finished third in their group behind eventual winners Egypt and Nigeria.

Since the Africa Cup of Nations, he has been called up on a regular basis to take part in qualification games and international friendlies.

He played at 2019 Africa Cup of Nations where Benin reached the quarter-finals.

== Career statistics ==
=== International ===
As of matches played on 16 August 2020

Benin national team
Year	Apps	Goals
2010	3	0
2011	2	0
2012	1	0
2013	2	0
2014	1	0
2015	1	0
2016	0	0
2017	0	0
2018	2	0
2019	7	0
Total	19	0
