= Damien Perquis (footballer, born 1986) =

French footballer

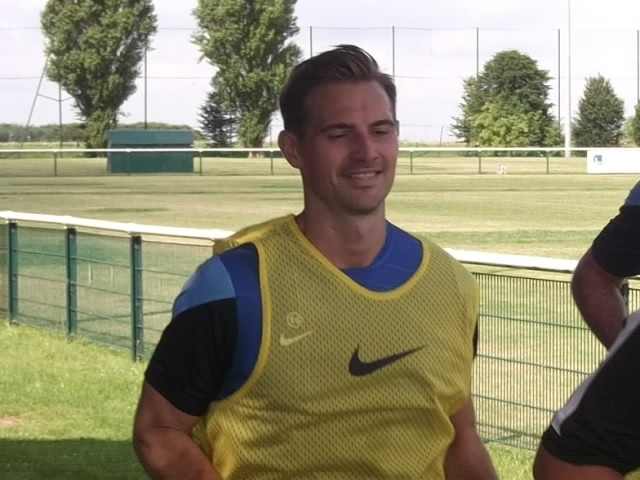
- Perquis in 2014

Personal information
- Date of birth: 8 March 1986 (age 40)
- Place of birth: Saint-Brieuc, France
- Height: 1.86 m (6 ft 1 in)
- Position: Goalkeeper

Youth career
- 2000–2004: Rennes
- 2004–2007: Brest

Senior career*
| Years | Team | Apps | (Gls) |
| 2007–2008 | Beauvais | 25 | (0) |
| 2008–2015 | Caen | 76 | (0) |
| 2015–2020 | Valenciennes | 139 | (0) |
| 2019–2020 | → TOP Oss (loan) | 17 | (0) |
| 2020–2022 | Saint-Amand FC | | |
| Total | | 257 | (0) |
- * Club domestic league appearances and goals

Damien Perquis (French pronunciation: [damjɛ̃ pɛʁkis]; born 8 March 1986) is a French former footballer who plays as a goalkeeper. He has formerly played professionally for Caen and Valenciennes.

He became first-choice goalkeeper in 2012, when he succeeded Alexis Thébaux in Caen.

In July 2020, after returning to Valenciennes FC from a loan spell at Dutch Eerste Divisie club TOP Oss, Perquis signed with lower league side Saint-Amand FC, who competed in the Régional 1 Ligue Hauts-de-France, one of the sixth tiers of the French football league system. He made the decision to move to the club after talking to Grégory Pujol who had also joined the club.

== Career statistics ==
Appearances and goals by club, season and competition
| Club | Season | League | | | National cup | | League cup | | Total | |
| Club | Season | Division | Apps | Goals | Apps | Goals | Apps | Goals | Apps | Goals |
|---|---|---|---|---|---|---|---|---|---|---|
| Brest | 2004–05 | Ligue 2 | 0 | 0 | 0 | 0 | 0 | 0 | 0 | 0 |
| Brest | 2005–06 | Ligue 2 | 0 | 0 | 0 | 0 | 0 | 0 | 0 | 0 |
| Brest | 2006–07 | Ligue 2 | 0 | 0 | 0 | 0 | 0 | 0 | 0 | 0 |
| Brest | Total | | 0 | 0 | 0 | 0 | 0 | 0 | 0 | 0 |
| Beauvais | 2007–08 | Championnat National | 25 | 0 | 2 | 0 | — | | 27 | 0 |
| Caen | 2008–09 | Ligue 1 | 0 | 0 | 0 | 0 | 0 | 0 | 0 | 0 |
| Caen | 2009–10 | Ligue 2 | 0 | 0 | 3 | 0 | 0 | 0 | 3 | 0 |
| Caen | 2010–11 | Ligue 1 | 0 | 0 | 1 | 0 | 2 | 0 | 3 | 0 |
| Caen | 2011–12 | Ligue 1 | 0 | 0 | 0 | 0 | 0 | 0 | 4 | 0 |
| Caen | 2012–13 | Ligue 2 | 38 | 0 | 0 | 0 | 1 | 0 | 39 | 0 |
| Caen | 2013–14 | Ligue 2 | 38 | 0 | 0 | 0 | 2 | 0 | 40 | 0 |
| Caen | 2014–15 | Ligue 1 | 0 | 0 | 0 | 0 | 2 | 0 | 2 | 0 |
| Caen | Total | | 76 | 0 | 4 | 0 | 7 | 0 | 87 | 0 |
| Valenciennes | 2015–16 | Ligue 2 | 35 | 0 | 1 | 0 | 0 | 0 | 36 | 0 |
| Valenciennes | 2016–17 | Ligue 2 | 36 | 0 | 0 | 0 | 1 | 0 | 37 | 0 |
| Valenciennes | 2017–18 | Ligue 2 | 36 | 0 | 1 | 0 | 0 | 0 | 37 | 0 |
| Valenciennes | 2018–19 | Ligue 2 | 32 | 0 | 1 | 0 | 0 | 0 | 33 | 0 |
| Valenciennes | Total | | 139 | 0 | 3 | 0 | 1 | 0 | 143 | 0 |
| TOP Oss (loan) | 2019–20 | Eerste Divisie | 17 | 0 | 0 | 0 | — | | 17 | 0 |
| Career total | | | 257 | 0 | 7 | 0 | 7 | 0 | 271 | 0 |
