= Nicolas Seube =

French footballer (born 1979)

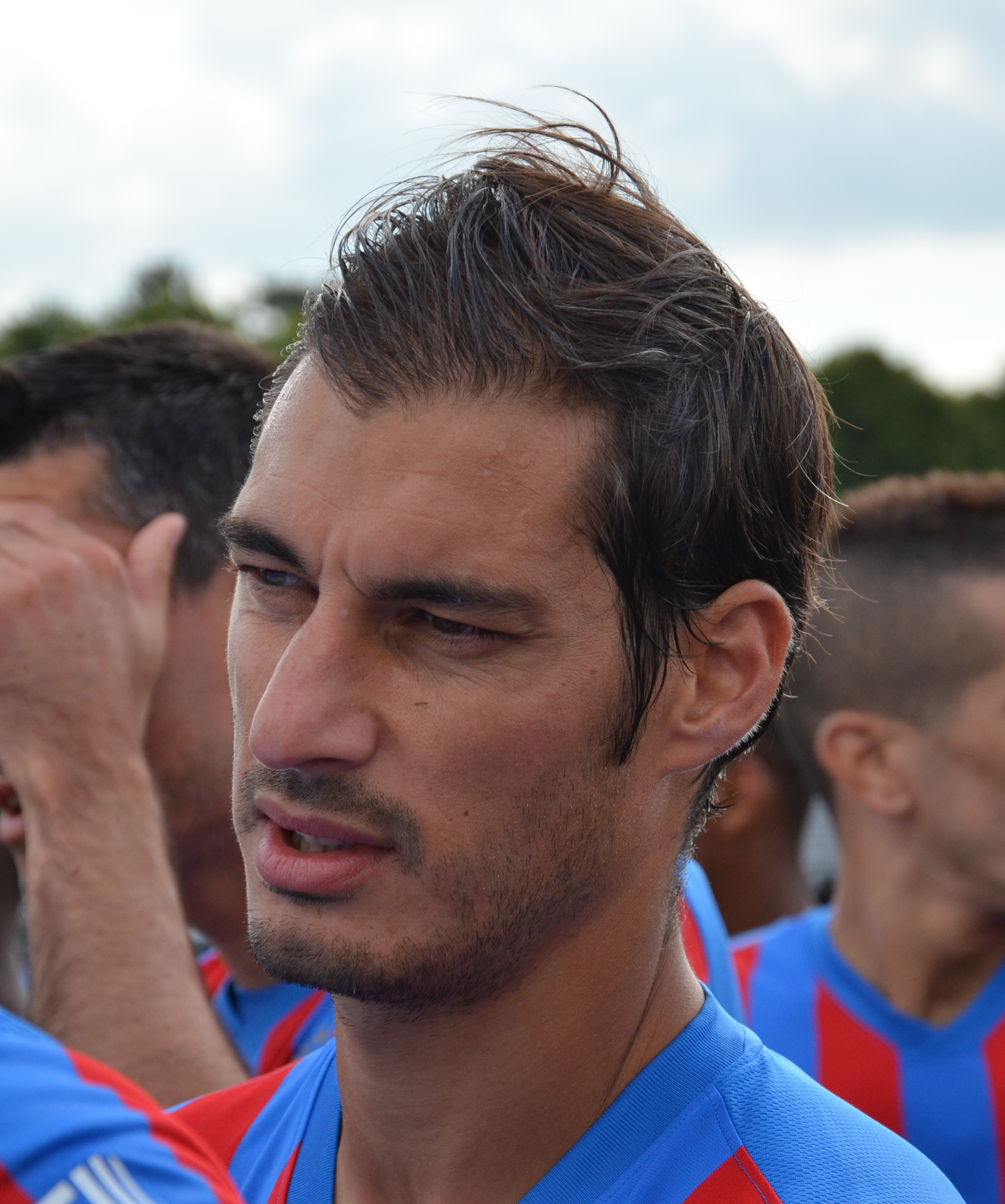
- Nicolas Seube in 2014

Personal information
- Date of birth: 11 August 1979 (age 47)
- Place of birth: Toulouse, France
- Height: 1.80 m (5 ft 11 in)
- Positions: Defender; midfielder

Youth career
- 1996–1997: Toulouse

Senior career*
Years	Team	Apps	(Gls)
1997–2001	Toulouse II	76	(2)
2001–2017	Caen	477	(10)

Managerial career
- 2018–2019: Caen (U19 assistant)
- 2019–2020: Caen II (assistant)
- 2020–2022: Caen (U19)
- 2021–2023: Caen (academy)
- 2022–2023: Caen II
- 2023–2024: Caen
- * Club domestic league appearances and goals

Nicolas Seube (born 11 August 1979) is a French professional football manager and a former player who played as a midfielder. He recently managed Ligue 3 club Caen.

== Playing career ==
Born in Toulouse, Seube began his football career for Toulouse FC but never played in its first team. In 2001, he was transferred to Stade Malherbe Caen, where he played firstly as a fullback. From the 2008–09 season, he preferred to play as a defensive midfielder.

He spent his whole career with Stade Malherbe Caen, scoring 10 goals in 424 appearances (6 goals in 179 in Ligue 1) between 2001 and 2015. He was promoted in Ligue 1 with his club in 2004, 2007, 2010, and 2014. He captained the club from 2006 to 2012.

In 2013, he surpassed Anthony Deroin's record of appearances for Caen and became the club's all-time leader in appearances.

He retired in 2017.

== Coaching career ==
On 29 November 2023, Seube was appointed head coach by Caen. On 29 December 2024, he was sacked by his club and replaced by Portuguese coach Bruno Baltazar.
