= José Saez =

French footballer (born 1982)

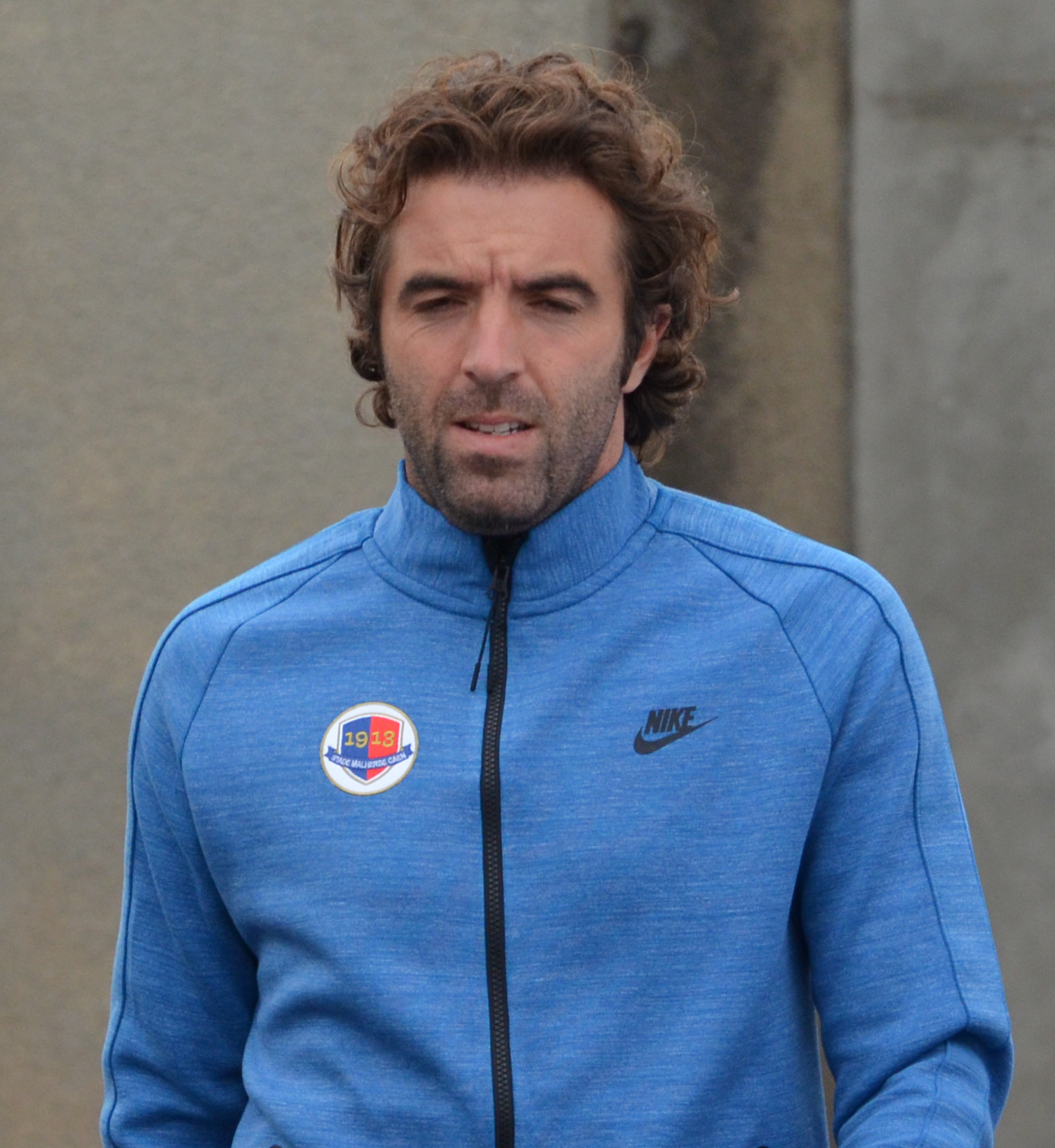
- José Saez in 2014

Personal information
- Date of birth: 7 May 1982 (age 44)
- Place of birth: Menen, Belgium
- Height: 1.70 m (5 ft 7 in)
- Position: Midfielder

Senior career*
Years	Team	Apps	(Gls)
2002–2004	Angers SCO	53	(6)
2004–2014	Valenciennes FC	228	(11)
2014–2015	SM Caen	16	(2)
2015–2017	Angers SCO	0	(0)
- * Club domestic league appearances and goals

José Saez (born 7 May 1982) is a French former football midfielder. He played at Valenciennes for nearly ten years solid and one year at Caen.

Saez holds both French and Spanish nationalities.
