= Stade Michel d'Ornano =

Stadium in Caen, France

Coordinates: 49°10′46.06″N 0°23′48.36″W

Stade Michel-d'Ornano
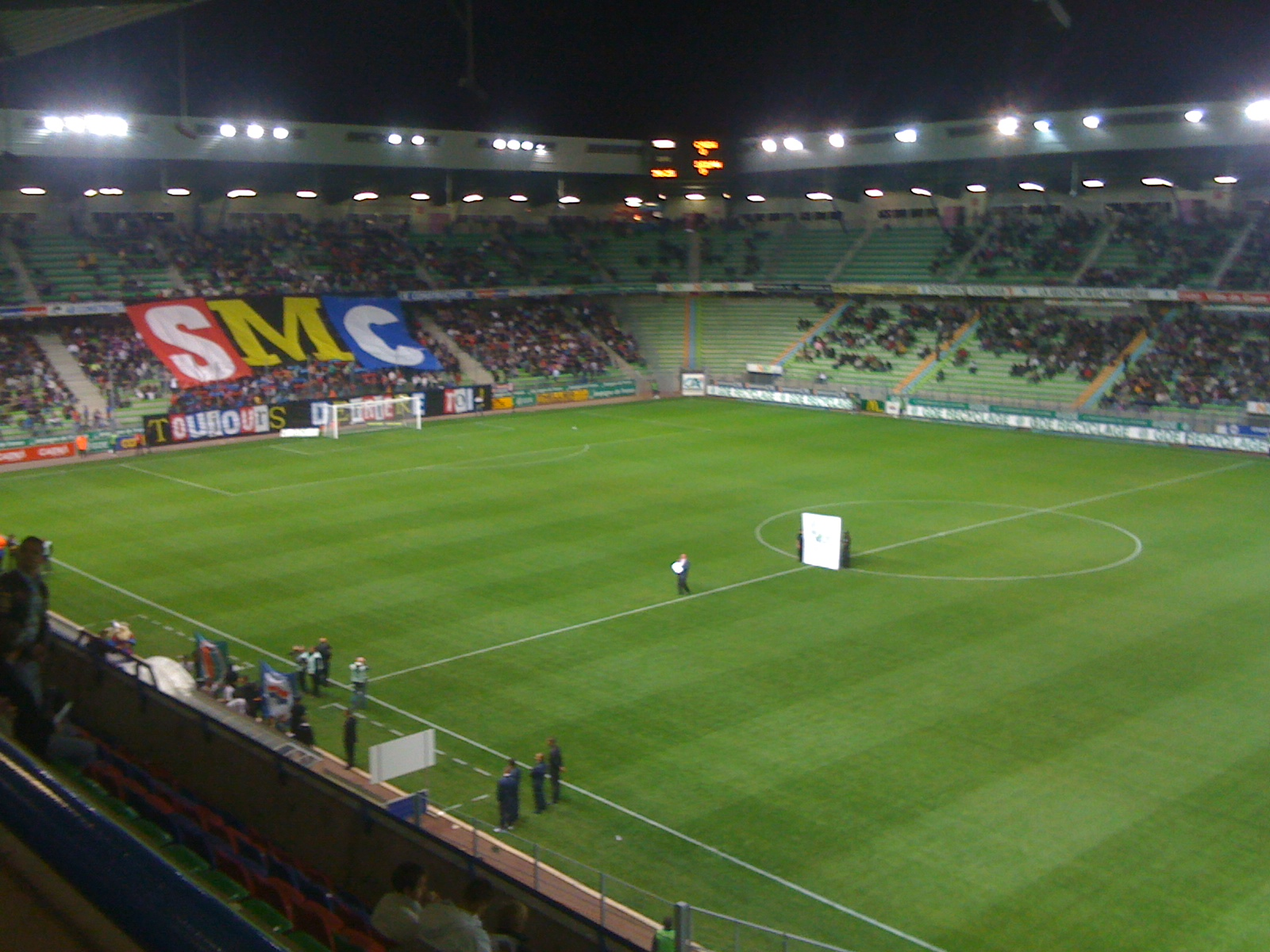
- Interactive map of Stade Michel-d'Ornano
- Location: Boulevard Georges Pompidou; BP 6138, 14064 Caen cedex
- Owner: Caen
- Capacity: 20,300
- Surface: Grass
- Field size: 105 m x 68 m

Construction
- Groundbreaking: December 1991
- Opened: 3 June 1993; 33 years ago
- Cost: 149 million French francs (22.7 million €)
- Architect: Cabinet LND

Tenant
- SM Caen

Stade Michel d'Ornano (pronounced [stad miʃɛl dɔʁnano]) is a multi-use stadium in Caen, France. It is currently used mostly for football matches and is the home stadium of Stade Malherbe Caen. It is named after the French politician Michel d'Ornano (1924–1991), former president of the Basse-Normandie region.

The stadium was built in 1993 to replace the Stade de Venoix, and has a capacity of 20,300 people.

== International matches ==
France national football team played twice in this stadium:

- France 3–1 Russia (28 July 1993)
- France 2–0 Israel (15 November 1995)

France national under-21 football team also played in this stadium during the qualifications for the European Championship:

- France 1–1 Israel (7 October 2006)
- France 5–0 Kazakhstan (5 September 2013)

== Attendances ==
The average attendance largely depends on results of Stade Malherbe Caen. Matches are regularly sold out when the club plays in Ligue 1, and average attendance is around 15,000 when SM Caen competes in second division.

The record attendance at Stade d'Ornano is 20,972, for a match against Olympique de Marseille in 2004.
