= Alexandre Raineau =

French footballer (born 1986)

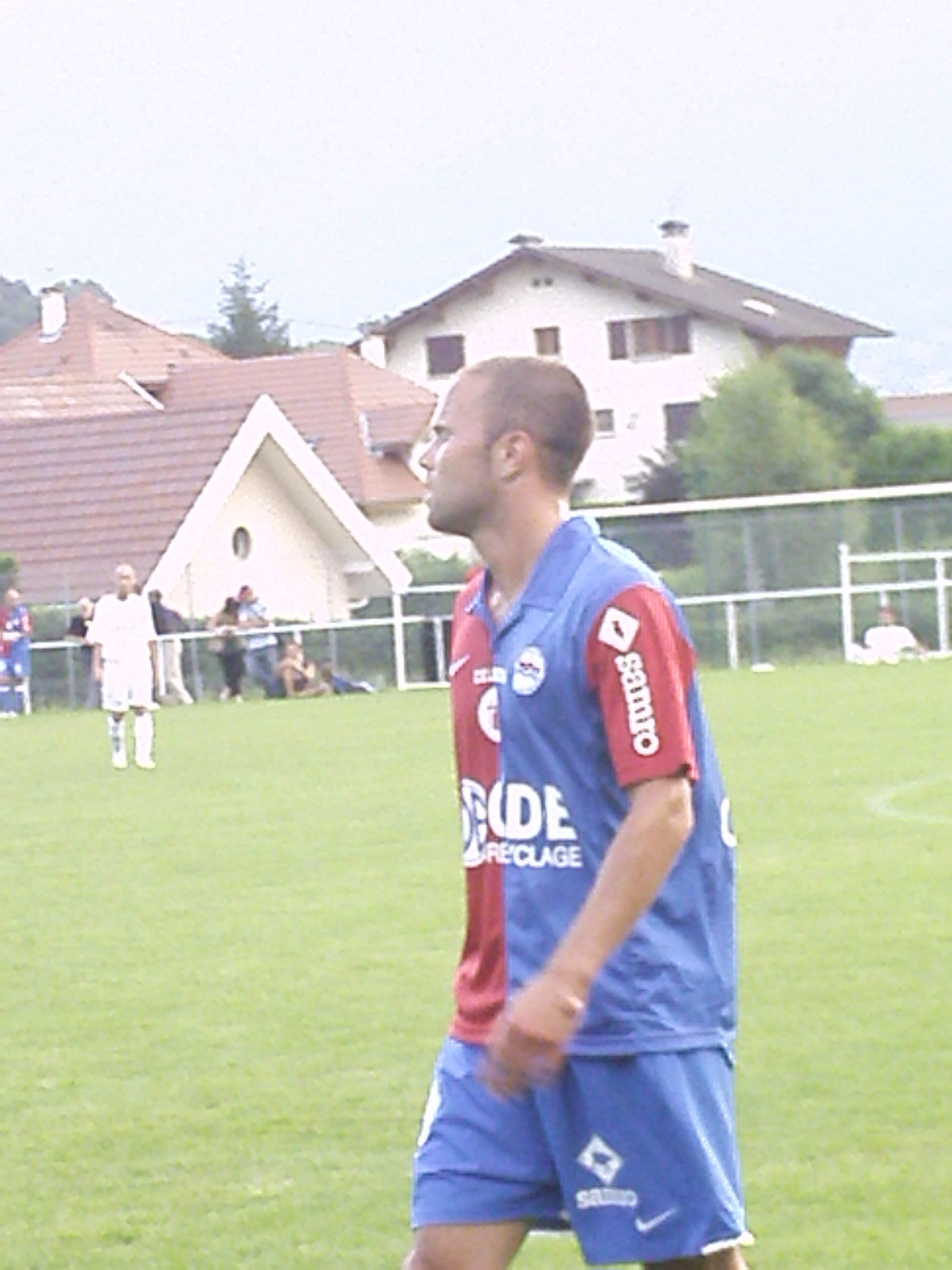
- Raineau with Caen in 2008

Personal information
- Date of birth: 21 June 1986 (age 40)
- Place of birth: Paris, France
- Height: 1.78 m (5 ft 10 in)
- Position: Midfielder

Youth career
- CSM Puteaux
- 1999–2002: INF Clairefontaine
- 2002–2006: Caen

Senior career*
Years	Team	Apps	(Gls)
2006–2016	Caen	106	(0)
2008	→ Libourne (loan)	18	(0)
2010–2016	Caen B	48	(2)
2016–2021	Châteauroux	59	(1)
- * Club domestic league appearances and goals as of 15 May 2021

Alexandre Raineau (born 21 June 1986) is a French professional footballer who plays as a midfielder.

== Career ==
Raineau began playing youth football with INF Clairefontaine before joining Stade Malherbe Caen for senior football. He spent ten seasons playing as a defensive midfielder, and later as a left-back, for Stade Malherbe Caen. He appeared in 137 competitive matches for the club, helping Caen achieve promotion to Ligue 1 on several occasions, including winning the 2010 Ligue 2 title.
