= 2015–16 ES Troyes AC season =

Troyes
2015–16 season
- Chairman: Daniel Masoni
- Manager: Jean-Marc Furlan
- Stadium: Stade de l'Aube
- Ligue 1: 20th (relegated)
- Coupe de France: Round of 16
- Coupe de la Ligue: Round of 32
- Top goalscorer: League: Corentin Jean (4); All: Corentin Jean (6)
- Highest home attendance: 16,266 vs Monaco (19 December 2015)
- Lowest home attendance: 5,747 vs Saint-Étienne (10 February 2016)
Home colours	Away colours	Third colours

The 2015–16 Troyes AC season is the 30th professional season of the club since its creation in 1986.

== Players ==
French teams are limited to four players without EU citizenship. Hence, the squad list includes only the principal nationality of each player; several non-European players on the squad have dual citizenship with an EU country. Also, players from the ACP countries—countries in Africa, the Caribbean, and the Pacific that are signatories to the Cotonou Agreement—are not counted against non-EU quotas due to the Kolpak ruling.

=== Current squad ===
As of 29 January 2016

Note: Flags indicate national team as defined under FIFA eligibility rules; some limited exceptions apply. Players may hold more than one non-FIFA nationality.

No.	Pos.	Nation	Player
1	GK	FRA	Matthieu Dreyer
2	DF	FRA	Johan Martial
3	DF	COD	Chris Mavinga (on loan from Rubin Kazan)
5	DF	FRA	Matthieu Saunier
7	MF	FRA	Yoann Court
8	MF	FRA	Stéphane Darbion
9	FW	SEN	Babacar Guèye
10	MF	FRA	Benjamin Nivet
11	DF	BRA	Rincón
12	FW	CMR	Henri Bienvenu
13	FW	COL	Brayan Perea (on loan from Lazio)
14	MF	BRA	Thiago Xavier
16	GK	GLP	Franck Grandel
17	DF	FRA	Guillaume Lacour
18	MF	TUN	Chaouki Ben Saada

No.	Pos.	Nation	Player
19	MF	FRA	Karim Azamoum
20	DF	MLI	Mahamadou N'Diaye
22	DF	FRA	Mory Koné
23	MF	TUN	Fabien Camus
24	MF	FRA	Lossémy Karaboué
25	MF	FRA	Jessy Pi (on loan from Monaco)
26	FW	TUR	Deniz Hümmet
27	FW	FRA	Corentin Jean (on loan from Monaco)
28	DF	FRA	Charles Traoré
29	MF	FRA	Quentin Othon
31	DF	RSA	Anele Ngcongca (on loan from Genk)
32	DF	SRB	Dušan Veškovac (on loan from Toulouse)
33	DF	HAI	Carlens Arcus
34	MF	FRA	Alois Confais
35	DF	FRA	Mouhamadou Dabo

=== Out on loan ===
Note: Flags indicate national team as defined under FIFA eligibility rules; some limited exceptions apply. Players may hold more than one non-FIFA nationality.

No. / Pos. / Nation / Player; — / GK / FRA / Paul Bernardoni (at Bordeaux)	No. / Pos. / Nation / Player; — / FW / CMR / Christian Bekamenga (at Metz)

== Transfers ==
=== Transfers in ===
Date	Pos.	Player	Age	Moved from	Fee	Notes
1 July 2015	MF	(Ivory Coast) Lossémy Karaboué	27	(France) Nancy	Free Transfer	
1 July 2015	FW	(Cameroon) Christian Bekamenga	29	(France) Stade Laval	Undisclosed	
26 July 2015	MF	(Tunisia) Fabien Camus	30	(Belgium) Genk	Undisclosed	
28 August 2015	MF	(France) Yanis Hamzaoui	19	(France) Valenciennes II	Undisclosed	
31 August 2015	DF	(France) Charles Traoré	23	(France) Nantes	Undisclosed	
5 September 2015	DF	(France) Johan Martial	24	(France) Brest	Free Transfer	

=== Loans in ===
Date	Pos.	Player	Age	Loaned from	Return date	Notes
2 July 2015	FW	(France) Corentin Jean	19	(France) Monaco	30 June 2016	
20 July 2015	MF	(Democratic Republic of the Congo) Jessy Pi	21	(France) Monaco	30 June 2016	
6 August 2015	DF	(Democratic Republic of the Congo) Chris Mavinga	24	(Russia) Rubin Kazan	30 June 2016	
13 August 2015	FW	(Colombia) Brayan Perea	22	(Italy) Lazio	30 June 2016	
29 August 2015	DF	(South Africa) Anele Ngcongca	27	(Belgium) Genk	30 June 2016	
31 August 2015	DF	(Serbia) Dušan Veškovac	29	(France) Toulouse	30 June 2016	

=== Transfers out ===
Date	Pos.	Player	Age	Moved to	Fee	Notes
1 July 2015	FW	(France) Corentin Jean	19	(France) Monaco	£2.8 Million	
1 July 2015	DF	(France) Florian Jarjat	35	Retired		
1 July 2015	DF	(France) Salimo Sylla	21	(France) Auxerre	Free Transfer	
1 July 2015	MF	(France) Mickaël Barreto	24	(France) Orléans	Free Transfer	
1 July 2015	DF	(France) Stéphen Drouin	31	Unattached	Released	
11 July 2015	DF	(France) Lionel Carole	24	(Turkey) Galatasaray	€1.5 Million	
9 September 2015	MF	(Mauritania) Khassa Camara	22	(Greece) Ergotelis	Free Transfer	
28 December 2015	GK	(France) Denis Petrić	27	(France) Angers	Undisclosed	
18 January 2016	MF	(France) Thomas Ayasse	28	(France) Le Havre	Undisclosed	
29 January 2016	FW	(France) Jimmy Cabot	21	(France) Lorient	€1.8 Million	

=== Loans out ===
Date	Pos.	Player	Age	Loaned to	Return date	Notes
5 August 2015	FW	(Cameroon) Christian Bekamenga	29	(France) Lens	1 January 2016	
14 January 2016	FW	(Cameroon) Christian Bekamenga	29	(France) Metz	30 June 2016	
31 January 2016	GK	(France) Paul Bernardoni	18	(France) Bordeaux	30 June 2016	

== Competitions ==
=== Ligue 1 ===
==== League table ====
Pos	Team	Pld	W	D	L	GF	GA	GD	Pts	Qualification or relegation
16	Guingamp	38	11	11	16	47	56	−9	44	
17	Toulouse	38	9	13	16	45	55	−10	40	
18	Reims (R)	38	10	9	19	44	57	−13	39	Relegation to Ligue 2 (Note: Starting this season, Ligue 1 decided to reduce the number of relegation spots from three to two. However, the decision was appealed and overturned so three teams were relegated.)
19	Gazélec Ajaccio (R)	38	8	13	17	37	58	−21	37	Relegation to Ligue 2
20	Troyes (R)	38	3	9	26	28	83	−55	18	Relegation to Ligue 2

Source: Ligue 1, Soccerway
Rules for classification: 1) Points; 2) Goal difference; 3) Goals scored; 4) Head-to-head points; 5) Head-to-head goal difference; 6) Fairplay ranking.
(R) Relegated

==== Results summary ====
Overall								Home						Away					
Pld	W	D	L	GF	GA	GD	Pts	W	D	L	GF	GA	GD	W	D	L	GF	GA	GD
38	3	9	26	28	83	−55	18	1	7	11	14	29	−15	2	2	15	14	54	−40

Last updated: 15 May 2016.
Source: Competitive matches

==== Results by round ====
Round	1	2	3	4	5	6	7	8	9	10	11	12	13	14	15	16	17	18	19	20	21	22	23	24	25	26	27	28	29	30	31	32	33	34	35	36	37	38
Ground	H	H	A	H	H	A	H	A	H	A	A	H	A	H	A	H	A	H	H	A	H	A	H	A	A	A	A	H	A	H	A	H	A	H	A	H	A	H
Result	D	D	L	D	L	L	L	D	L	L	L	L	L	D	L	L	D	D	D	L	L	W	L	L	L	W	L	L	L	L	L	L	L	W	L	L	L	D
Position	9	11	17	17	18	18	18	19	19	19	20	20	20	20	20	20	20	20	20	20	20	20	20	20	20	20	20	20	20	20	20	20	20	20	20	20	20	20

Source: Ligue1
A = Away; H = Home; W = Win; D = Draw; L = Loss

==== Matches ====
Win Draw Loss

8 August 2015 1	Troyes	0–0	Gazélec Ajaccio	Troyes
21:00 CEST (UTC+02:00)		Report	Youga (yellow card) 16'; Martinez (yellow card) 27'; Ducourtioux (yellow card) 41'; Sylla (yellow card) 75'	Stadium: Stade de l'Aube; Attendance: 10,858; Referee: Jérôme Miguelgorry

15 August 2015 2	Troyes	3–3	Nice	Troyes
21:00 CEST (UTC+02:00)	Jean 3'; Pereira (yellow card) 4'; Mavinga (yellow card) 12' (yellow-red card) 32'; Court (yellow card) 14'; Camus 77'; Thiago Xavier 90+3', (yellow card) 90+3'	Report	Ben Arfa 6' (pen.), (yellow card) 69'; Pléa 16'; Le Marchand 42'; Correia (yellow card) 45+2'; Rafetraniaina (yellow card) 90+2'	Stadium: Stade de l'Aube; Attendance: 11,468; Referee: Johann Hamel

23 August 2015 3	Marseille	6–0	Troyes	Marseille
21:00 CEST (UTC+02:00)	Barrada 19'; Lemina (yellow card) 28'; Diarra 47'; Batshuayi 56', 90'; Ocampos 63'; Alessandrini 88'	Report	Perea (yellow card) 69'	Stadium: Stade Vélodrome; Attendance: 58,356; Referee: Tony Chapron

29 August 2015 4	Troyes	0–0	Montpellier	Troyes
20:00 CEST (UTC+02:00)	Saunier (yellow card) 56'; Pereira (yellow card) 79'	Report	Marveaux (yellow card) 86'	Stadium: Stade de l'Aube; Attendance: 11,094; Referee: Wilfried Bien

12 September 2015 5	Troyes	1–3	Caen	Troyes
20:00 CEST (UTC+02:00)	Mavinga (yellow card) 34'; Pi (yellow card) 57'; Court (yellow card) 65'; Veškovac (yellow card) 89'; Othon 90+2'	Report	Féret 21'; Yahia 38'; Ben Youssef (yellow card) 43' (yellow-red card) 57'; Bessat 63'	Stadium: Stade de l'Aube; Attendance: 10,795; Referee: Bartolomeu Varela

19 September 2015 6	Angers	1–0	Troyes	Angers
20:00 CEST (UTC+02:00)	Saïss (yellow card) 23'; Ndoye (red card) 33'; Mangani 57' (pen.); Camara (yellow card) 74'	Report	Karaboué (yellow card) 57'; Pi (yellow card) 60'; Jean (yellow card) 85'	Stadium: Stade Jean-Bouin; Attendance: 10,166; Referee: Lionel Jaffredo

23 September 2015 7	Troyes	0–1	Saint-Étienne	Troyes
19:00 CEST (UTC+02:00)	Ayasse (yellow card) 50'; Mavinga (yellow card) 66'; Nivet (yellow card) 82'	Report	Ayasse 13' (o.g.)	Stadium: Stade de l'Aube; Attendance: 12,090; Referee: Sébastien Moreira

26 September 2015 8	Rennes	1–1	Troyes	Rennes
20:00 CEST (UTC+02:00)	Sylla (yellow card) 45+1' (yellow-red card) 90+3'; Henrique (yellow card) 68'; Diagné 71'	Report	Pi 11'; Karaboué (yellow card) 23'; Perea (yellow card) 45'; Nivet (yellow card) 75'	Stadium: Roazhon Park; Attendance: 20,170; Referee: Johann Hamel

3 October 2015 9	Troyes	0–1	Guingamp	Troyes
20:00 CEST (UTC+02:00)	Ayasse (yellow card) 56' (yellow-red card) 85'; Perea (yellow card) 80'	Report	Coco (yellow card) 62'; Héry (yellow card) 72'; Sankharé 81'	Stadium: Stade de l'Aube; Attendance: 14,225; Referee: Jérôme Miguelgorry

17 October 2015 10	Nantes	3–0	Troyes	Nantes
20:00 CEST (UTC+02:00)	Rongier 41'; Sabaly 50'; Bammou 62'	Report	Veškovac (yellow card) 71'	Stadium: Stade de la Beaujoire; Attendance: 24,402; Referee: Mikael Lesage

25 October 2015 11	Bordeaux	1–0	Troyes	Bordeaux
17:00 CET (UTC+01:00)	Sané (yellow card) 58'; Ounas 78'	Report	Ayasse (yellow card) 23'; Mavinga (yellow card) 35'; Darbion (yellow card) 75'; Pereira (yellow card) 77'	Stadium: Nouveau Stade de Bordeaux; Attendance: 21,082; Referee: Saïd Ennjimi

31 October 2015 12	Troyes	0–1	Lyon	Troyes
20:00 CET (UTC+01:00)	Jean (red card) 36'; Camus (yellow card) 78'; Mavinga (yellow card) 90+5'	Report	Gonalons (yellow card) 4'; Beauvue 78' (pen.)	Stadium: Stade de l'Aube; Attendance: 14,877; Referee: Stéphane Jochem

7 November 2015 13	Lorient	4–1	Troyes	Lorient
20:00 CET (UTC+01:00)	Jeannot 33'; Moukandjo 58' 90+2' (pen.); N'Dong 78'	Report	Nivet 63' (pen.)	Stadium: Stade du Moustoir; Attendance: 9,338; Referee: Hakim Ben El Hadj

21 November 2015 14	Troyes	1–1	Lille	Troyes
20:00 CET (UTC+01:00)	Darbion (yellow card) 8'; Ayasse (yellow card) 17'; Jean 69'	Report	Benzia 9' (yellow card) 27'	Stadium: Stade de l'Aube; Attendance: 10,407; Referee: Lionel Jaffredo

28 November 2015 15	Paris Saint-Germain	4–1	Troyes	Paris
17:10 CET (UTC+01:00)	Cavani 20'; Ibrahimović 58' (pen.); Kurzawa 67'; Augustin 84'	Report	Mavinga (yellow card) 29'; Ayasse 90+1'	Stadium: Parc des Princes; Attendance: 45,932; Referee: Bartolomeu Varela

2 December 2015 16	Troyes	0–3	Toulouse	Troyes
19:00 CET (UTC+01:00)	Darbion (yellow card) 72' (yellow-red card)	Report	Diop 2'; Tisserand (yellow card) 31' (yellow-red card); Akpa Akpro 49' (yellow card) 82'; Pešić 86'	Stadium: Stade de l'Aube; Attendance: 10,183; Referee: Sébastien Moreira

5 December 2015 17	Reims	1–1	Troyes	Reims
20:00 CET (UTC+01:00)	Kankava (yellow card) 20' de Préville 36'	Report	Thiago Xavier (yellow card) 35'; Pi 47'	Stadium: Stade Auguste Delaune; Attendance: 10,765; Referee: Jérôme Miguelgorry

12 December 2015 18	Troyes	1–1	Bastia	Troyes
20:00 CET (UTC+01:00)	Jean (yellow card) 39'; Cabot 59'; Martins Pereira (yellow card) 63'	Report	Fofana 23'; Palmieri (yellow card) 26'; Squillaci (yellow card) 42'; Modesto (yellow card) 56'; Peybernes (yellow card) 87'	Stadium: Stade de l'Aube; Attendance: 10,117; Referee: Stéphane Lannoy

19 December 2015 19	Troyes	0–0	Monaco	Troyes
20:00 CET (UTC+01:00)	Dabo (red card) 3'; Azamoum (yellow card) 42'; Karaboué (yellow card) 82'	Report	Hélder Costa (yellow card) 43'; Wallace (yellow card) 56'; Lemar (yellow card) 81'	Stadium: Stade de l'Aube; Attendance: 16,266; Referee: Wilfrid Bien

9 January 2016 20	Lyon	4–1	Troyes	Lyon
17:00 CET (UTC+01:00)	Lacazette 18'; Umtiti (yellow card) 62'; Ghezzal 72'; Ferri 81'; Beauvue 90'	Report	Nivet (yellow card) 22'; Camus 67'	Stadium: Parc Olympique Lyonnais; Attendance: 55,169; Referee: Wilfrid Bien

16 January 2016 21	Troyes	2–4	Rennes	Troyes
20:00 CET (UTC+01:00)	Camus 7'; Jean 15'; Ngcongca (yellow card) 20'; Dabo (yellow card) 38'; Cabot (yellow card) 51'	Report	Diagné (yellow card) 14' (goal) 21', 39' (pen.); Dembélé 28'; Grosicki 81'	Stadium: Stade de l'Aube; Attendance: 10,292; Referee: Saïd Ennjimi

23 January 2016 22	Lille	1–3	Troyes	Villeneuve d'Ascq
20:00 CET (UTC+01:00)	Boufal 25' (pen.) (yellow card) 43'; Bauthéac (yellow card) 35'	Report	Camus (yellow card) 25'; Cabot 77', 80'; Pi 86'	Stadium: Stade Pierre-Mauroy; Attendance: 26,431; Referee: Nicolas Rainville

30 January 2016 23	Troyes	0–1	Nantes	Troyes
20:00 CET (UTC+01:00)	Jean (yellow card) 67'	Report	Gillet 41' (yellow card) 87'; Moimbé (yellow card) 65'; Riou (yellow card) 68'	Stadium: Stade de l'Aube; Attendance: 11,592; Referee: Johan Hamel

3 February 2016 24	Guingamp	4–0	Troyes	Guingamp
19:00 CET (UTC+01:00)	Erdinç 5'; Kerbrat (yellow card) 30'; Sankharé 46'; Giresse 56'; Blas 90'	Report	Dabo (yellow card) 18'; Traoré (yellow card) 28'; Thiago Xavier (yellow card) 32'	Stadium: Stade du Roudourou; Attendance: 13,973; Referee: Jérôme Miguelgorry

6 February 2016 25	Bastia	2–0	Troyes	Furiani
20:00 CET (UTC+1)	Ayité 10', 83'; Leca (red card) 48'	Report	Nivet (yellow card) 4'; Perea (red card) 60'; Camus (red card) 80'; Mavinga (yellow card) 86'	Stadium: Stade Armand Cesari; Attendance: 10,441; Referee: Sébastien Moreira

13 February 2016 26	Gazélec Ajaccio	2–3	Troyes	Ajaccio, Corsica
20:00 CET (UTC+01:00)	Zoua 1'; Filippi (yellow card) 38'; Ducourtioux (yellow card) 48', (goal) 57'	Report	Ben Saada 8'; Nivet (yellow card) 30'; Azamoum 36', 43'; Martial (yellow card) 50'; Confais (yellow card) 53'	Stadium: Stade Ange Casanova; Attendance: 3,485; Referee: Nicolas Rainville

20 February 2016 27	Monaco	3–1	Troyes	Fontvieille
20:00 CET (UTC+1)	Carrillo 25', 37'; Toulalan (yellow card) 43'; Bakayoko (yellow card) 83'; Mbappe Lottin 90+3'	Report	Guèye 80'	Stadium: Stade Louis II; Attendance: 5,650; Referee: Johan Hamel

27 February 2016 28	Troyes	0–1	Lorient	Troyes
20:00 CET (UTC+01:00)	Ngcongca (yellow card) 50'; Camus (red card) 90'; Court (yellow card) 90+2'	Report	Waris 3'; Philippoteaux (yellow card) 70'	Stadium: Stade de l'Aube; Attendance: 10,326; Referee: Saïd Ennjimi

5 March 2016 29	Nice	2–1	Troyes	Nice
20:00 CET (UTC+1)	Germain 12'; Boscagli (yellow card) 56'; Traoré 72'	Report	Jean 27'; Dabo (yellow card) 29'	Stadium: Allianz Riviera; Attendance: 13,160; Referee: Bartolomeu Varela

13 March 2016 30	Troyes	0–9	Paris Saint-Germain	Troyes
14:00 CET (UTC+1)	Thiago Xavier (yellow card) 73'; Karaboué (red card) 74'	Report	Cavani 15', 75', (penalty missed) 75'; Pastore 17'; Rabiot 19'; Ibrahimović 46', 52', 55', 88'; Saunier 58' (o.g.)	Stadium: Stade de l'Aube; Attendance: 19,184; Referee: François Letexier

19 March 2016 31	Caen	2–1	Troyes	Caen
20:00 CET (UTC+01:00)	Yahia 35'; Rodelin (yellow card) 37', (goal) 54'	Report	Thiago Xavier 22'; Rincón (yellow card) 31'; Court (yellow card) 44'	Stadium: Stade Michel d'Ornano; Attendance: 17,585; Referee: Lionel Jaffredo

2 April 2016 32	Troyes	0–1	Angers	Troyes
20:00 CET (UTC+01:00)	Confais (yellow card) 39'	Report	Ketkeophomphone (yellow card) 90'; Diers 90+2'	Stadium: Stade de l'Aube; Attendance: 10,472; Referee: Stéphane Jochem

9 April 2016 33	Saint-Étienne	1–0	Troyes	Saint-Étienne
20:00 CET (UTC+01:00)	Sall (yellow card) 37'; Roux (yellow card) 60'; Maupay 75'	Report	Pi (yellow card) 20'; Thiago Xavier (yellow card) 52'	Stadium: Stade Geoffroy-Guichard; Attendance: 29,824; Referee: Johan Hamel

16 April 2016 34	Troyes	2–1	Reims	Troyes
20:00 CET (UTC+1)	Camus 50'; Nivet 60' (pen.); Thiago Xavier (yellow card) 65'; Saunier (yellow card) 87'	Report	Conte (yellow card) 30'; Carrasso (yellow card) 60'; Bifouma 64', (yellow card) 87'	Stadium: Stade de l'Aube; Attendance: 12,650; Referee: Tony Chapron

24 April 2016 35	Montpellier	4–1	Troyes	Montpellier
17:00 CEST (UTC+2)	Roussillon 14'; Saunier 27' (o.g.); Martin 34'; Hilton (red card) 41'; Camara 55'	Report	Darbion 20'; Confais (yellow card) 68'; Rincón (yellow card) 82'	Stadium: Stade de la Mosson; Attendance: 14,323; Referee: Mikael Lesage

30 April 2016 36	Troyes	2–4	Bordeaux	Troyes
19:00 CET (UTC+01:00)	Pi (yellow card) 7'; Jean (yellow card) 23', (goal) 69'; Nivet 56' (pen.), (yellow card) 57'; Court (yellow card) 90+3'	Report	Rolán 14', 72'; Mavinga 41' (o.g.); Gulbert (yellow card) 43'; Diabaté 60'	Stadium: Stade de l'Aube; Attendance: 13,442; Referee: Bartolomeu Varela

7 May 2016 37	Toulouse	1–0	Troyes	Toulouse
21:00 CET (UTC+01:00)	Trejo 53', (yellow card) 86'; Akpa Akpro (yellow card) 86'	Report	Azamoum (yellow card) 18'; Saunier (yellow card) 50'; Ben Saada (yellow card) 88'	Stadium: Stadium Municipal; Attendance: 29,444; Referee: Anthony Gautier

14 May 2016 38	Troyes	1–1	Marseille	Troyes
21:00 CET (UTC+01:00)	Camus 10'; Thiago Xavier (yellow card) 30'; Martial (yellow card) 81'	Report	Dja Djédjé (yellow card) 23'; Fletcher 61'	Stadium: Stade de l'Aube; Attendance: 16,623; Referee: François Lexetier

=== Coupe de la Ligue ===
28 October 2015 Round of 32	Lille	2–1	Troyes	Villeneuve d'Ascq
21:00 CET (UTC+01:00)	Sunzu 49'; Guirassy 57'; Nangis (yellow card) 72'; Yeboah (yellow card) 74'; Corchia (yellow card) 79'	Report	Perea 29'; Othon (yellow card) 33'; Thiago Xavier (yellow card) 36'	Stadium: Stade Pierre-Mauroy; Attendance: 9,886; Referee: Benoît Bastien

=== Coupe de France ===
2 January 2016 Round of 64	Dunkerque	3–4 (a.e.t.)	Troyes	Dunkerque
18:00 CET (UTC+01:00)	Fofana 13'; Cvitković 63'; Tchokounté 94'	Report	Jessy Pi 7', 116'; Thiago Xavier 49'; Saunier (yellow card) 62'; Darbion (red card) 77'; Camus 96'; Confais (yellow card) 99'	Stadium: Stade Tribut; Attendance: 2,999; Referee: Romain Delpech

20 January 2016 Round of 32	Concarneau	1–3	Troyes	Concarneau
18:30 CET (UTC+01:00)	Ndoye (yellow card) 66'; Moyo 68'	Report	Jean 42', 50'; Traoré (yellow card) 62'; Azamoum 82'	Stadium: Stade Guy Piriou; Attendance: 5,812; Referee: Amaury Delerue

10 February 2016 Round of 16	Troyes	1–2 (a.e.t.)	Saint-Étienne	Troyes
19:00 CET (UTC+01:00)	Veškovac (yellow card) 61'; Nivet 78'; Karaboue (yellow card) 81'	Report	Dekoke (yellow card) 49'; Tannane 62'; Pajot (yellow card) 76'; Cohade (yellow card) 105'; Maupay 107'; Roux (yellow card) 118'	Stadium: Stade de l'Aube; Attendance: 5,747; Referee: Antony Gautier
