= 2013–14 Coupe de la Ligue =

French League Cup

Tournament details
- Country: France
- Teams: 44

Final positions
- Champions: Paris Saint-Germain (4th title)
- Runners-up: Lyon

Tournament statistics
- Matches played: 41
- Goals scored: 132 (3.22 per match)
- Top goal scorer: Edinson Cavani (4 goals)

The 2013–14 Coupe de la Ligue was the 20th edition of the French league cup competition. The competition was organized by the Ligue de Football Professionnel and was open to the 44 professional clubs in France that are managed by the organization.

The defending champions were Saint-Étienne, who defeated Rennes 1–0 in the final of the previous season. They were eliminated in the Last 16 by eventual champions Paris Saint-Germain, who won their record fourth title by defeating Lyon 2–1 in the final.

The winner of the competition should have qualified for the 2014–15 UEFA Europa League and be inserted into the third qualifying round, but Paris Saint-Germain had already qualified for the Champions League via their league position.

== First round ==
First round matches were held over 2 days; 6 & 7 of August 2013. The 11 winners secure places in the second round.

| 6 August 2013 | Brest (2) | 1–4 | Auxerre (2) | Brest |
| 18:45 CEST | Ayité 55' | Report | Ntep 51'; Viale 68'; Haller 74'; Aït Ben Idir 90+4' (pen.) | Stadium: Stade Francis-Le Blé; Attendance: 6,230; Referee: Sébastien Desiage |

| 6 August 2013 | Tours (2) | 2–2 (a.e.t.) (4–3 p) | Istres (2) | Tours |
| 20:00 CEST | Ketkeophomphone 32' (pen.); Delort 87' | Report | Le Goff 30'; Assis 57' | Stadium: Stade de la Vallée du Cher; Attendance: 3,527; Referee: Christian Guillard |
| | Penalties |
| | Chavalerin (penalty scored); Diawara (penalty scored); Bouhours (penalty scored); Bergougnoux (penalty scored) | | Barillon (penalty missed); Sainati (penalty scored); Bocognano (penalty scored); Leroy (penalty scored); Boulaya (penalty missed) |

| 6 August 2013 | Boulogne (3) | 1–1 (a.e.t.) (3–4 p) | Créteil (2) | Boulogne-sur-Mer |
| 20:00 CEST | Maurício 90' | Report | Andriatsima 82' | Stadium: Stade de la Libération; Attendance: 1,831; Referee: Olivier Husset |
| | Penalties |
| | Dumas (penalty missed); Heloise (penalty scored); Rimane (penalty scored); Nianankoro (penalty scored); Maurício (penalty missed) | | Andriatsima (penalty scored); Essombé (penalty scored); Di Bartolomeo (penalty scored); Danilson (penalty scored); Seck (penalty missed) |

| 6 August 2013 | Laval (2) | 0–1 | Nîmes (2) | Laval |
| 20:00 CEST | | Report | Nouri 72' | Stadium: Stade Francis Le Basser; Attendance: 4,358; Referee: Jérôme Miguelgorry |

| 6 August 2013 | Niort (2) | 2–3 | Le Havre (2) | Niort |
| 20:00 CEST | Rocheteau 37'; Martin 86' | Report | Mahrez 3'; Mesloub 20'; Le Bihan 41' | Stadium: Stade René Gaillard; Attendance: 2,864; Referee: Alexandre Perreau Niel |

| 6 August 2013 | Amiens (3) | 1–0 | Châteauroux (2) | Amiens |
| 20:00 CEST | Téhoué 55' | Report | | Stadium: Stade de la Licorne; Attendance: 2,540; Referee: Frank Schneider |

| 6 August 2013 | Caen (2) | 2–0 | Metz (2) | Caen |
| 20:00 CEST | Kodjia 5', 35' | Report | | Stadium: Stade Michel d'Ornano; Attendance: 5,186; Referee: Alexandre Castro |

| 6 August 2013 | Gazélec Ajaccio (3) | 2–2 (a.e.t.) (3–5 p) | Troyes (2) | Ajaccio |
| 20:00 CEST | François 79'; Poggi 117' | Report | Cabot 78'; Marcos 100' | Stadium: Stade Ange Casanova; Attendance: 1,308; Referee: Philippe Kalt |
| | Penalties |
| | François (penalty scored); Poggi (penalty scored); Rivieyran (penalty missed); Martinez (penalty scored) | | Psaume (penalty scored); Othon (penalty scored); Carole (penalty scored); Court (penalty scored); Marcos (penalty scored) |

| 6 August 2013 | Clermont (2) | 3–0 | Dijon (2) | Clermont-Ferrand |
| 20:00 CEST | Betsch 29', 69'; Dugimont 57' | Report | | Stadium: Stade Gabriel Montpied; Attendance: 1,851; Referee: Floris Aubin |

| 7 August 2013 | CA Bastia (2) | 0–1 | Arles (2) | Furiani |
| 20:00 CEST | | Report | Omrani 45+3' | Stadium: Stade Armand Cesari; Attendance: 1,981; Referee: Nicolas Rainville |

| 7 August 2013 | Angers (2) | 1–2 (a.e.t.) | Lens (2) | Angers |
| 20:00 CEST | Ayari 66' (pen.) | Report | Valdivia 32' (pen.); Touzghar 114' | Stadium: Jean-Bouin Stadium; Attendance: 6,764; Referee: Bartolomeu Varela |

== Second round ==
The round featured the 12 winners of the first round matches. The matches were contested on 27 August 2013.

| 27 August 2013 | Caen (2) | 0–3 | Auxerre (2) | Caen |
| 18:45 CEST | | Report | Ntep 30'; Coulibaly 76'; Sammaritano 90+2' | Stadium: Stade Michel d'Ornano; Attendance: 6,298; Referee: Benoît Millot |

| 27 August 2013 | Le Havre (2) | 2–3 (a.e.t.) | Amiens (3) | Le Havre |
| 20:00 CEST | Mahrez 70', 84' | Report | Téhoué 23', 69'; Koubemba 100' | Stadium: Stade Jules Deschaseaux; Attendance: 3,817; Referee: Christian Guillard |

| 27 August 2013 | Clermont (2) | 0–1 | Tours (2) | Clermont-Ferrand |
| 20:00 CEST | | Report | Bergougnoux 5' | Stadium: Stade Gabriel Montpied; Attendance: 2,572; Referee: Sébastien Desiage |

| 27 August 2013 | Nîmes (2) | 1–2 | Troyes (2) | Nîmes |
| 20:00 CEST | Benmeziane 18' | Report | Cabot 39'; N'Diaye 80' | Stadium: Stade des Costières; Attendance: 3,496; Referee: Olivier Thual |

| 27 August 2013 | Lens (2) | 3–4 | Créteil (2) | Lens |
| 20:00 CEST | Coulibaly 13' (pen.); Ducasse 79'; N'Diaye 87' | Report | Lesage 36' (pen.), 84'; Seck 49'; Essombé 66' | Stadium: Stade Félix-Bollaert; Attendance: 17,639; Referee: Saïd Ennjimi |

| 27 August 2013 | Nancy (2) | 1–0 | Arles (2) | Nancy |
| 20:00 CEST | Louis 85' | Report | | Stadium: Stade Marcel Picot; Attendance: 11,651; Referee: Mikael Lesage |

== Third round ==
The round features the 6 winners of the second round matches in addition to 14 Ligue 1 clubs didn't participate in the European competitions. The matches were contested on 29 & 30 October 2013.

| 29 October 2013 | Bastia (1) | 1–0 | Ajaccio (1) | Furiani |
| 18:00 CET | Ilan 7' | Report | | Stadium: Stade Armand Cesari |

| 29 October 2013 | Valenciennes (1) | 1–3 | Troyes (2) | Valenciennes |
| 20:00 CET | Dossevi 47' | Report | Court 4'; Gimbert 31', 56' | Stadium: Stade du Hainaut |

| 29 October 2013 | Rennes (1) | 2–1 (a.e.t.) | Nancy (2) | Rennes |
| 20:00 CET | Hunou 41'; Emerson 101' | Report | Walter 90' | Stadium: Stade de la Route de Lorient |

| 29 October 2013 | Tours (2) | 3–1 | Amiens (3) | Tours |
| 20:00 CET | Adnane 13'; Bergougnoux 67'; Chevalerin 87' | Report | Seguin 81' (o.g.) | Stadium: Stade de la Vallée du Cher |

| 29 October 2013 | Créteil (2) | 1–3 | Toulouse (1) | Créteil |
| 20:00 CET | Belvito 32' | Report | Aguilar 51'; Trejo 79'; Ben Yedder 90' | Stadium: Stade Dominique Duvauchelle |

| 29 October 2013 | Lille (1) | 0–1 (a.e.t.) | Auxerre (2) | Lille |
| 20:00 CET | | Report | Haller 113' | Stadium: Stade Pierre-Mauroy |

| 29 October 2013 | Nantes (1) | 2–0 | Lorient (1) | Nantes |
| 20:55 CET | Bedoya 73'; Nkoudou 90' | Report | | Stadium: Stade de la Beaujoire |

| 30 October 2013 | Guingamp (1) | 1–2 | Evian (1) | Guingamp |
| 18:00 CET | Yatabaré 25' | Report | Sougou 56'; Cambon 68' | Stadium: Stade du Roudourou |

| 30 October 2013 | Sochaux (1) | 3–2 (a.e.t.) | Montpellier (1) | Montbéliard |
| 20:00 CET | Prcić 38'; Corchia 115'; Contout 119' | Report | Martin 48' (pen.); Stambouli 120' | Stadium: Stade Auguste Bonal |

| 30 October 2013 | Reims (1) | 1–0 | Monaco (1) | Reims |
| 20:55 CET | Devaux 34' | Report | | Stadium: Stade Auguste-Delaune II |

== Round of 16 ==
The draw for the Round of 16 of the 2013–14 edition of the Coupe de la Ligue was held on 7 November 2013. The round featured the ten winners of the third round matches and the six Ligue 1 clubs that qualify for European competition in the 2012–13 season. The matches were contested on 17 and 18 December 2013.

| 17 December 2013 | Nantes (1) | 1–0 | Auxerre (2) | Nantes |
| 20:55 CET | Aristeguieta 74' | Report | | Stadium: Stade de la Beaujoire; Attendance: 13,151; Referee: Amaury Delerue |

| 18 December 2013 | Lyon (1) | 3–2 | Reims (1) | Lyon |
| 17:00 CET | Gomis 58'; Lacazette 61'; Gourcuff 82' | Report | Oniangue 65'; Ayité 87' (pen.) | Stadium: Stade de Gerland; Attendance: 21,654; Referee: Saïd Ennjimi |

| 18 December 2013 | Nice (1) | 3–0 | Sochaux (1) | Nice |
| 18:45 CET | Pejčinović 14'; Genevois 31'; Pied 34' | Report | | Stadium: Stade du Ray; Attendance: 15,500; Referee: Philippe Kalt |

| 18 December 2013 | Paris Saint-Germain (1) | 2–1 (a.e.t.) | Saint-Étienne (1) | Paris |
| 20:55 CET | Cavani 25', 118' | Report | Erdinç 78' | Stadium: Parc des Princes; Attendance: 45,608; Referee: Laurent Duhamel |

| 18 December 2013 | Troyes (2) | 3–2 | Tours (2) | Troyes |
| 20:55 CET | Court 6', 23'; Nivet 90+1' | Report | Bergougnoux 5'; Adnane 44' | Stadium: Stade de l'Aube; Attendance: 4,141; Referee: Benoît Bastien |

| 18 December 2013 | Marseille (1) | 2–1 | Toulouse (1) | Marseille |
| 20:55 CET | Mendy 13'; Gignac 29' (pen.) | Report | Spajić 43' | Stadium: Stade Vélodrome; Attendance: 35,621; Referee: Lionel Jaffredo |

| 18 December 2013 | Evian (1) | 2–1 | Bastia (1) | Annecy |
| 20:55 CET | Wass 62', 67' | Report | Ilan 32' | Stadium: Parc des Sports, Annecy; Attendance: 4,053; Referee: Benoît Millot |

| 18 December 2013 | Rennes (1) | 1–2 | Bordeaux (1) | Rennes |
| 20:55 CET | Doucouré 52' | Report | Henrique 50'; Jussiê 90+1' (pen.) | Stadium: Stade de la Route de Lorient; Attendance: 18,714; Referee: Tony Chapron |

== Quarter-finals ==
The draw for the quarter-finals of the 2013–14 edition of the Coupe de la Ligue was held on 18 December 2013 following the conclusion of the Round of 16 matches. The round featured the eight winners of the Round of 16 matches and were contested on 14 and 15 January 2014.

| 14 January 2014 | Bordeaux (1) | 1–3 | Paris Saint-Germain (1) | Bordeaux |
| 21:00 CET | Biyogo 48' | Report | Pastore 45+1'; Rabiot 85'; Matuidi 88' | Stadium: Stade Chaban-Delmas; Attendance: 29,250; Referee: Ruddy Buquet |

| 15 January 2014 | Nantes (1) | 4–3 | Nice (1) | Nantes |
| 18:45 CET | Đorđević 48', 52'; Vizcarrondo 78'; Gakpé 87' | Report | Digard 17'; Kolodziejczak 72'; Cvitanich 85' | Stadium: Stade de la Beaujoire; Attendance: 11,861; Referee: Tony Chapron |

| 15 January 2014 | Troyes (2) | 3–1 | Evian (1) | Troyes |
| 18:45 CET | Nivet 32'; Gimbert 44'; Cabot 90+3' | Report | N'Sikulu 69' | Stadium: Stade de l'Aube; Attendance: 5,972; Referee: Bartolomeu Varela |

| 15 January 2014 | Lyon (1) | 2–1 | Marseille (1) | Lyon |
| 20:55 CET | Gourcuff 24'; Gomis 74' | Report | Gignac 89' | Stadium: Stade de Gerland; Attendance: 27,338; Referee: Antony Gautier |

== Semi-finals ==
The draw for the semifinals of the 2013–14 edition of the Coupe de la Ligue was held on 15 January 2014 following the conclusion of the quarterfinal matches. The round features the 4 winners of the quarterfinal matches and will be contested on 4 and 5 February 2014.

| 4 February 2014 | Nantes (1) | 1–2 | Paris Saint-Germain (1) | Nantes |
| 21:00 CET | Veigneau 82' | Report | Ibrahimović 5', 90' | Stadium: Stade de la Beaujoire; Attendance: 35,714; Referee: Laurent Duhamel |

| 5 February 2014 | Lyon (1) | 2–1 | Troyes (2) | Lyon |
| 20:55 CET | Lacazette 17'; Gomis 27' | Report | Xavier 35' | Stadium: Stade de Gerland; Attendance: 19,168; Referee: Lionel Jaffredo |

== Final ==
19 April 2014
21:00 CEST

| Lyon | 1–2 | Paris Saint-Germain |
|---|---|---|
| Lacazette 56' | Report; Report | Cavani 4', 33' (pen.) |

Stade de France, Saint-Denis
Attendance: 78,489
Referee: Stéphane Lannoy

== See also ==
- 2013–14 Ligue 1
- 2013–14 Ligue 2
