= Chris Mavinga =

Congolese-French footballer (born 1991)

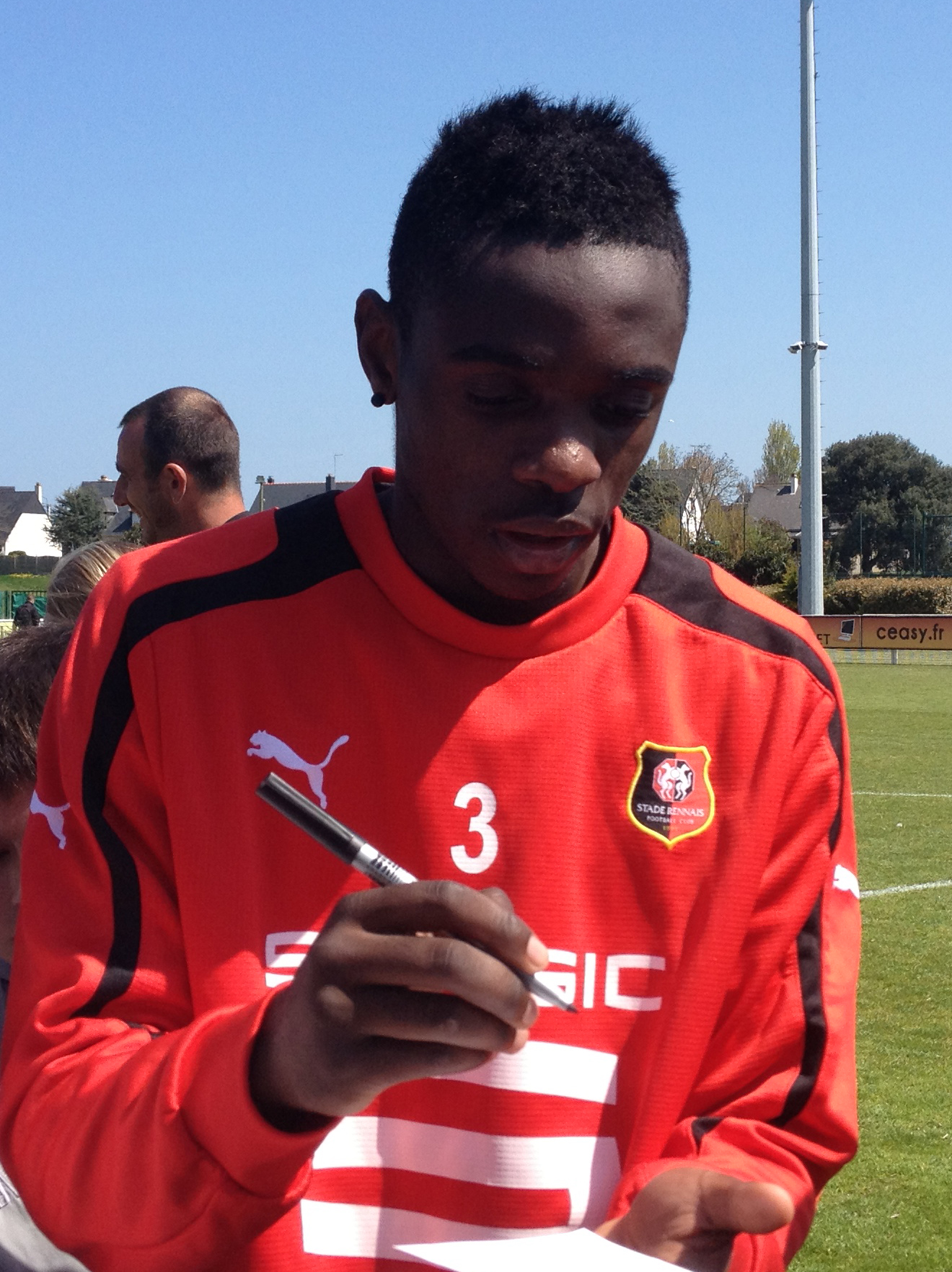
- Mavinga with Rennes in 2013

Personal information
- Date of birth: 26 May 1991 (age 35)
- Place of birth: Meaux, France
- Height: 1.83 m (6 ft 0 in)
- Position: Centre-back

Youth career
- 1997–2004: Combs-la-Ville
- 2004–2005: Sénart-Moissy
- 2005–2006: Viry-Châtillon
- 2006–2009: Paris Saint-Germain
- 2009–2010: Liverpool

Senior career*
Years	Team	Apps	(Gls)
2010–2011	Liverpool	0	(0)
2011	→ Genk (loan)	9	(0)
2011–2013	Rennes	41	(0)
2012	Rennes B	2	(0)
2013–2017	Rubin Kazan	7	(0)
2014–2015	→ Reims (loan)	9	(0)
2015–2016	→ Troyes (loan)	20	(0)
2017–2022	Toronto FC	124	(0)
2023	LA Galaxy	19	(0)

International career
2009	France U18	4	(0)
2009–2010	France U19	14	(0)
2010–2011	France U20	4	(0)
2011–2012	France U21	9	(0)
2015–2022	DR Congo	5	(0)
- * Club domestic league appearances and goals as of 21 October 2023

Chris Mavinga (born 26 May 1991) is a professional footballer who plays as a centre-back. A French youth international, who was a part of the team that won the 2010 UEFA European Under-19 Championship on home soil, he has chosen to represent DR Congo at senior level.

Mavinga joined Rubin Kazan in 2013 after spending two years at French club Rennes. Prior to joining Rennes, he spent three years at the Camp des Loges, the training center of French club Paris Saint-Germain and also two years with Liverpool.

== Club career ==
=== Early career ===
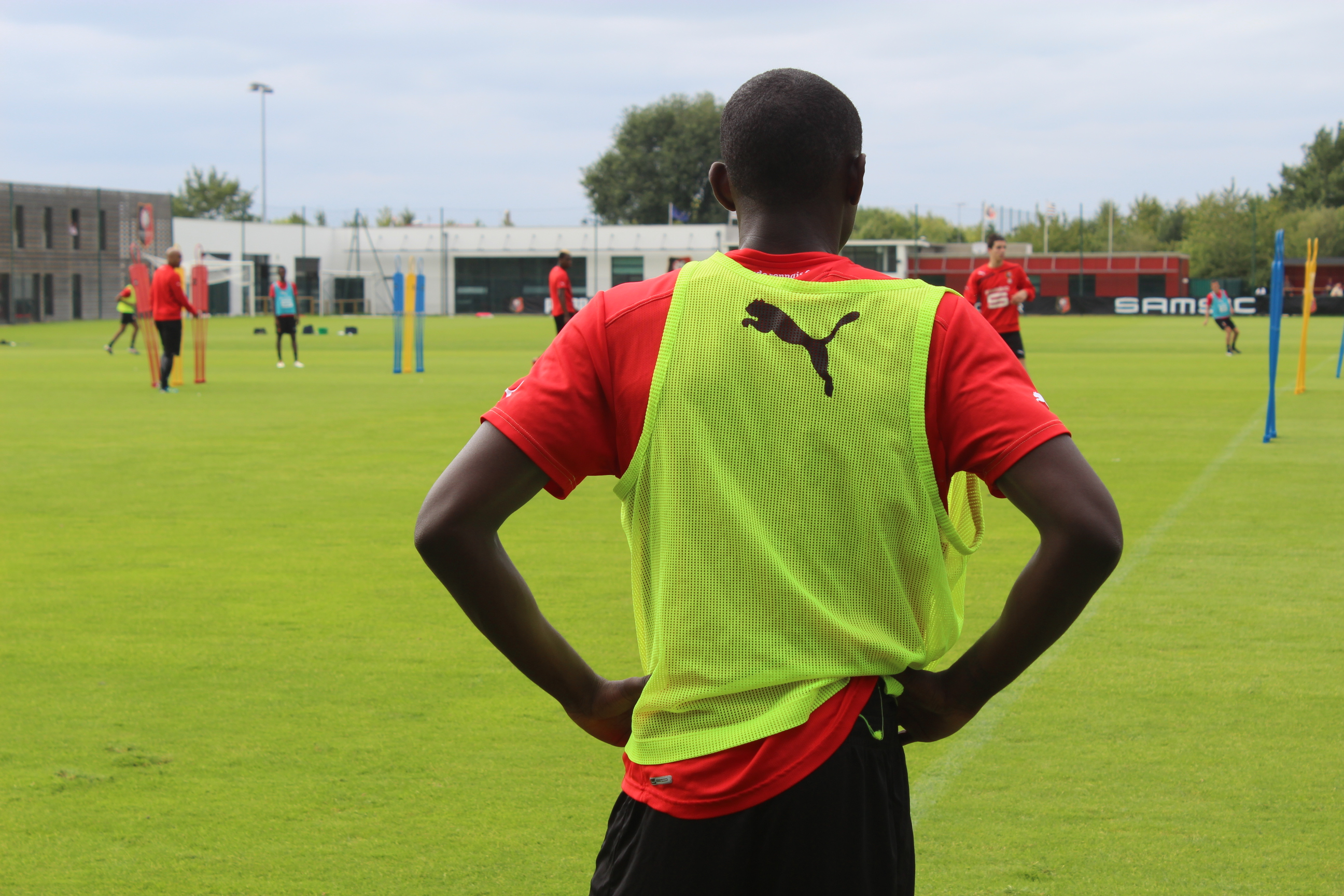
Mavinga in training at Rennes.

Mavinga was born in Meaux, Greater Paris, to an Angolan mother and a DR Congolese father. He began his football career at CA Combs-la-Ville, a local club in nearby Combs-la-Ville. He spent seven years at the club and, in 2004, departed for amateur outfit US Sénart-Moissy. The following year, Mavinga joined ES Viry-Châtillon and played on the club's under-16 team. While playing at Viry-Châtillon, Mavinga played in an under-16 league match against the youth academy of Paris Saint-Germain in Paris. He impressed the professional club's scouts and, following the season, was offered a deal to join the club on an aspirant (youth) contract. Mavinga agreed to the move and joined the club in June 2006. Prior to signing with Paris Saint-Germain, he was approached by English club Liverpool. Mavinga was inserted onto the club's under-18 team and helped the squad reach the Championnat National under-18 championship match where they were defeated by the under-18 team of Marseille.

=== Liverpool ===
During the 2008–09 season, Mavinga began training with the senior team of Paris Saint-Germain. However, during his stint with the team, he grew frustrated at the lack of guidance from the club's youth structure, as well as the unapproachable attitude of a few senior team players. In June 2009, Mavinga was again contacted by Liverpool, who stated their interest in the player without offering a contract. While waiting on Liverpool's offer, Mavinga also awaited an offer from Paris Saint-Germain, however the latter's offer did not meet the player's expectations. On 7 July 2009, Mavinga signed with Liverpool after agreeing to a three-year deal. Prior to the agreement, he was also coveted by Liverpool's league rival Arsenal. Many supporters and members of Paris Saint-Germain attributed Mavinga's move to Liverpool solely for financial reasons, however, Mavinga denounced the notion by stating that he joined the English club simply for sporting reasons. He also blamed his departure on the firing of Paris Saint-Germain's former manager Paul Le Guen with whom he shared a good relationship. Upon his arrival at Liverpool, Mavinga was placed onto the club's reserve team and played in the Premier Reserve League. During the latter part of the 2009–10 season, he began training with the club's senior team.

On 23 August 2010, Mavinga admitted that he was frustrated at his lack of playing time on the senior team stating that, following the firing of Rafa Benítez, he was relegated back to training full-time with the reserve team by new manager Roy Hodgson.

==== Loan to Genk ====
On 21 December 2010, the Belgian media reported that Belgian Pro League club Genk had acquired Mavinga on loan for the rest of the season. Despite initial speculation of Mavinga verbally agreeing to join Turkish club Antalyaspor, the move to Genk was completed on 11 January 2011. On 13 February, Mavinga made his professional debut appearing as a substitute in a 2–0 victory over Standard Liège. On 17 May, Mavinga broke the jaw and fractured the nose of Standard Liège player Mehdi Carcela-Gonzalez after accidentally kicking him in the face during the match.

=== Rennes ===
On 19 July 2011, Mavinga returned to France signing a four-year contract with Rennes. The transfer fee was priced at £1 million and Mavinga was assigned the number 3 shirt. On the opening game of the season, Mavinga made his debut for Rennes in a 4–0 loss against Montpellier. He since would be often used in first team in and out in his first season, having his playing time reduced and would be unused substitute in the matches. At the end of the season, Mavinga soon had a falling out with manager Frédéric Antonetti after taking exception to being made to train separately from the group.

The following season, Belgian Pro League club Racing Genk, his former club he played whilst on loan, renewed their interests signing him and made a bid on him. However, Rennes rejected a bid for Mavinga, insisting Genk increase their bid for worth about four or six million euros for him. Instead, Genk ended their interest signing Mavinga, by signing Brian Hamalainen. Shortly after this, Mavinga would soon be more often, with his increased of playing time, playing in the left-back position. After his suspension from the national team, Mavinga, along with Rennes teammate Yann M'Vila, was suspended until further notice on 19 October and ordered to train with the youth team. Their action was even threatened by Antonetti, with sidelined the pair until the end of the season. Among criticised the duo are general manager Pierre Dréossi, believing they disrespect football. Mavinga would make his return until 3 November 2012, as Rennes win 1–0 against Stade Reims and since retain his first team place in defense. On 15 February 2013, Mavinga made a mistake, scoring the own-goal, as Rennes lose 2–0 against Lille.

=== Rubin Kazan ===
On 7 August 2013, Mavinga agreed to join Russian side Rubin Kazan, for a reported fee of €5 million. He joined on a four-year contract, where he played with former Rennes teammate Yann M'Vila.

He made his full league debut in an away match at Ural Sverdlovsk Oblast on 31 August 2013. Rubin won the game 3–0, in which Chris put in a man of the match display at left back, breaking up Ural attacks and setting up Rubin ones. He limped off injured late on.

=== Toronto FC ===
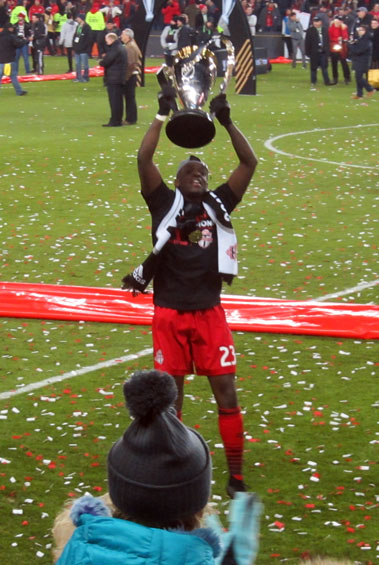
Mavinga celebrating with MLS Cup in 2017

On 30 January 2017, Mavinga agreed to join Canadian MLS side Toronto FC. He agreed to a three-year contract.

On 8 March 2018, Toronto re-signed Mavinga to a multi-year contract extension.

=== LA Galaxy ===
On 5 January 2023, Mavinga joined Major League Soccer side LA Galaxy on a deal through 2024.

== International career ==
Mavinga was a French youth international and have earned caps with both the under-18 and under-19 teams. He made his youth international debut on 25 March 2009 in the under-18 team's friendly match against Germany in Markranstädt. France won the match 4–3. On 13 June, Mavinga was a part of the team that contested England in a 4–2 victory. The match was played at Wembley Stadium in front of 15,000 spectators and the victory resulted in the team being presented the Fallenhero Trophy by The Football Association chairman Trevor Brooking. With the under-19 team, Mavinga was a regular call up of coach Francis Smerecki often starting in the centre back position alongside Johan Martial or Sébastien Faure. He made his under-19 debut on 9 October 2009 in 4–2 defeat to the Netherlands. After consistently appearing with the team for the campaign, on 7 June 2010, he was named to coach Smerecki's 18-man squad to participate in the 2010 European Under-19 Football Championship. He featured in four of the team's five matches including the final match against Spain, which France won 2–1. The title is the country's second UEFA Under-19 championship.

Due to France's victory at the UEFA Under-19 championship, the nation qualified for the 2011 U-20 World Cup, which merited under-20 team appearances for Mavinga. He made his debut with the team on 7 October 2010 in a friendly match against Portugal, which ended 3–3. Mavinga, subsequently, appeared in three matches for the team during the 2010–11 campaign and, on 10 June 2011, was named to the 21-man squad to participate in the U-20 World Cup. During the week leading up to the team's first match, Mavinga suffered an ankle injury during a training session. The injury was deemed serious and Mavinga was forced to drop out of the squad, which resulted in the player missing the competition.

In November 2012, Mavinga was suspended from national teams until 31 December 2013 for disciplinary reasons.

Later, he decided not to represent France, but the DR Congo instead. He made his in 2015 and has appeared in five games for his country since.

== Career statistics ==
=== Club ===
As of match played 21 October 2023

Appearances and goals by club, season and competition
Club	Season	League			National cup (Note: Includes Coupe de France, Canadian Championship and U.S. Open Cup)		League vup (Note: Includes Coupe de la Ligue and MLS Cup playoffs)		Continental (Note: Includes UEFA Europa League and CONCACAF Champions League)		Other		Total	
Club	Season	Division	Apps	Goals	Apps	Goals	Apps	Goals	Apps	Goals	Apps	Goals	Apps	Goals
Liverpool	2010–11	Premier League	0	0	0	0	0	0	0	0	—		0	0
Genk (loan)	2010–11	Belgian Pro League	9	0	0	0	0	0	—		—		9	0
Rennes	2011–12	Ligue 1	14	0	2	0	1	0	5	0	—		22	0
Rennes	2012–13	Ligue 1	27	0	1	0	3	0	—		—		31	0
Rennes	Total		41	0	3	0	4	0	5	0	—		53	0
Rennes B (loan)	2012–13	Championnat National 3	2	0	—		—		—		—		2	0
Rubin Kazan	2013–14	Russian Premier League	7	0	0	0	0	0	8	0	—		15	0
Rubin Kazan	2014–15	Russian Premier League	0	0	0	0	0	0	—		—		0	0
Rubin Kazan	2015–16	Russian Premier League	0	0	0	0	0	0	—		—		0	0
Rubin Kazan	2016–17	Russian Premier League	0	0	0	0	0	0	—		—		0	0
Rubin Kazan	Total		7	0	0	0	0	0	8	0	—		15	0
Reims (loan)	2014–15	Ligue 1	9	0	1	0	1	0	—		—		11	0
Troyes (loan)	2015–16	Ligue 1	20	0	2	0	1	0	—		—		23	0
Toronto FC	2017	Major League Soccer	26	0	3	0	5	0	—		—		34	0
Toronto FC	2018	Major League Soccer	12	0	3	0	—		4	0	—		19	0
Toronto FC	2019	Major League Soccer	26	0	1	0	4	0	2	0	—		33	0
Toronto FC	2020	Major League Soccer	19 (Note: Includes three appearances in MLS is Back Tournament group stage)	0	0	0	1	0	—		1 (Note: Appearance in MLS is Back Tournament knockout stage)	0	21	0
Toronto FC	2021	Major League Soccer	22	0	2	0	—		1	0	—		25	0
Toronto FC	2022	Major League Soccer	19	0	2	0	—		—		—		21	0
Toronto FC	Total		124	0	11	0	10	0	7	0	1	0	153	0
LA Galaxy	2023	Major League Soccer	19	0	2	0	—		—		0	0	21	0
Career total			231	0	18	0	12	0	18	0	1	0	287	0

== Honours ==
=== Club ===
Genk

- Belgian Pro League: 2010–11

Toronto FC

- MLS Cup: 2017
- Supporters' Shield: 2017
- Canadian Championship: 2017, 2018
- Trillium Cup: 2017, 2019

=== International ===
France

- UEFA European Under-19 Championship: 2010
