= Matthieu Dreyer =

French footballer (born 1989)

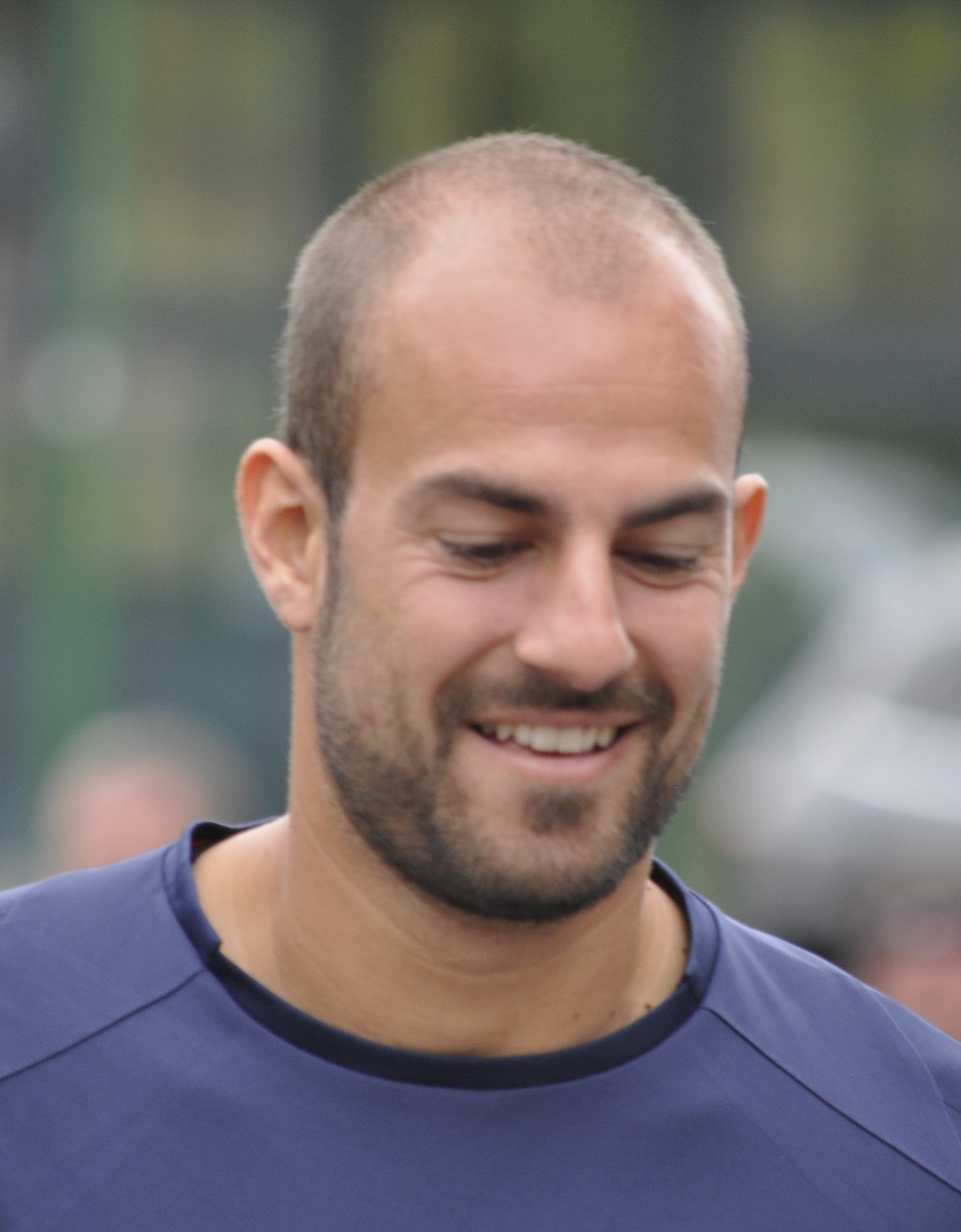
- Dreyer during training with Caen in August 2016

Personal information
- Date of birth: 20 March 1989 (age 37)
- Place of birth: Strasbourg, France
- Height: 1.88 m (6 ft 2 in)
- Position: Goalkeeper

Youth career
- 1998–2003: AS Ernolsheim/Bruche
- 2003–2009: Sochaux

Senior career*
Years	Team	Apps	(Gls)
2007–2011	Sochaux	20	(0)
2010–2011	Sochaux B	9	(0)
2011–2012	Fréjus Saint-Raphaël	32	(0)
2012–2016	Troyes	30	(0)
2012–2015	Troyes B	17	(0)
2016–2018	Caen B	10	(0)
2016–2018	Caen	2	(0)
2018–2020	Amiens	0	(0)
2020–2022	Lorient	31	(0)
2022–2024	Saint-Étienne	9	(0)
2024	Strasbourg	0	(0)
Total		160	(0)

International career
2004–2005	France U16	14	(0)
2005–2006	France U17	12	(0)
2006–2007	France U18	5	(0)
2009	France U20	3	(0)
2010	France U21	1	(0)
- * Club domestic league appearances and goals as of 28 June 2023

Matthieu Dreyer (born 20 March 1989) is a French professional footballer who has played as a goalkeeper for Ligue 1 club Strasbourg.

== Club career ==
Dreyer began his career in Alsace playing for local club AS Ernolsheim/Bruche. In 2003, he moved to the famous Sochaux academy. During his youth career with Sochaux, he won the Coupe Gambardella in 2007. Dreyer was listed as the third goalkeeper for the 2007–08 season and appeared on the bench several times including two UEFA Cup matches, though he did not make an appearance. He signed his first professional contract following the season agreeing to a three-year deal. Dreyer was officially promoted to the senior squad and given the number 30 shirt, the typical number for the third-choice goalkeeper in France.

For much of the 2008–09 season, Dreyer played in the CFA helping the Sochaux reserves finish a respectable 6th. He made his professional debut on 28 February 2009 starting in goal, ahead of second choice Jérémy Gavanon, for the injured Teddy Richert against Nice. For his efforts, Dreyer earned a clean sheet in a 1–0 victory with Václav Svěrkoš scoring the lone goal.

In 2012, after one season in the Championnat National, he joined Troyes as a second-choice keeper. He agreed to the termination of his contract in August 2016.

In July 2020, Dreyer joined Lorient, newly promoted to Ligue 1, on a free transfer, having agreed on a three-year contract.

On 23 August 2022, Dreyer signed for Ligue 2 side Saint-Étienne on a two-year contract.

== International career ==
Dreyer has been a France international since age 12 when he earned caps with his local regional sides, Bas-Rhin and Alsace, in the Predator Cup. He has featured with the U-15s, U-16s, U-17s, and the U-18s. On 25 May 2009, he was selected to the under-20 squad to participate in the 2009 Mediterranean Games.

== Career statistics ==
Appearances and goals by club, season and competition
Club	Season	League			National cup		League cup		Europe		Other		Total	
Club	Season	Division	Apps	Goals	Apps	Goals	Apps	Goals	Apps	Goals	Apps	Goals	Apps	Goals
Sochaux	2007–08	Ligue 1	0	0	0	0	0	0	0	0	0	0	0	0
Sochaux	2008–09	Ligue 1	1	0	0	0	0	0	—		—		1	0
Sochaux	2009–10	Ligue 1	8	0	1	0	1	0	—		—		10	0
Sochaux	2010–11	Ligue 1	11	0	0	0	1	0	—		—		12	0
Sochaux	Total		20	0	1	0	2	0	—		—		23	0
Sochaux B	2010–11	CFA	9	0	—		—		—		—		9	0
Fréjus Saint-Raphaël	2011–12	Championnat National	32	0	1	0	—		—		—		33	0
Troyes	2012–13	Ligue 1	0	0	4	0	0	0	—		—		4	0
Troyes	2013–14	Ligue 2	15	0	2	0	2	0	—		—		19	0
Troyes	2014–15	Ligue 2	0	0	0	0	0	0	—		—		0	0
Troyes	2015–16	Ligue 1	15	0	3	0	0	0	—		—		18	0
Troyes	2016–17	Ligue 2	0	0	—		—		—		—		0	0
Troyes	Total		30	0	9	0	2	0	—		—		41	0
Troyes B	2012–13	CFA 2	4	0	—		—		—		—		4	0
Troyes B	2014–15	CFA	5	0	—		—		—		—		5	0
Troyes B	2015–16	CFA	8	0	—		—		—		—		8	0
Troyes B	Total		17	0	—		—		—		—		17	0
Caen B	2016–17	CFA 2	4	0	—		—		—		—		4	0
Caen B	2017–18	Championnat National 3	6	0	—		—		—		—		6	0
Caen B	Total		10	0	—		—		—		—		10	0
Caen	2016–17	Ligue 1	2	0	1	0	0	0	—		—		3	0
Caen	2017–18	Ligue 1	0	0	0	0	0	0	—		—		17	0
Caen	Total		2	0	1	0	0	0	—		—		3	0
Amiens	2018–19	Ligue 1	0	0	2	0	2	0	—		—		4	0
Amiens	2019–20	Ligue 1	0	0	1	0	3	0	—		—		4	0
Amiens	Total		0	0	3	0	5	0	—		—		32	0
Lorient	2020–21	Ligue 1	15	0	0	0	—		—		—		15	0
Lorient	2021–22	Ligue 1	16	0	1	0	—		—		—		17	0
Lorient	Total		31	0	1	0	—		—		—		32	0
Saint-Étienne	2022–23	Ligue 2	9	0	1	0	—		—		—		10	0
Saint-Étienne	2023–24	Ligue 2	0	0	1	0	—		—		—		1	0
Saint-Étienne	Total		9	0	2	0	—		—		—		11	0
Strasbourg	2023–24	Ligue 1	0	0	—		—		—		—		0	0
Career total			160	0	18	0	9	0	0	0	0	0	187	0

== Honours ==
Sochaux U19

- Coupe Gambardella: 2007
