= Matthieu Saunier =

French professional footballer (born 1990)

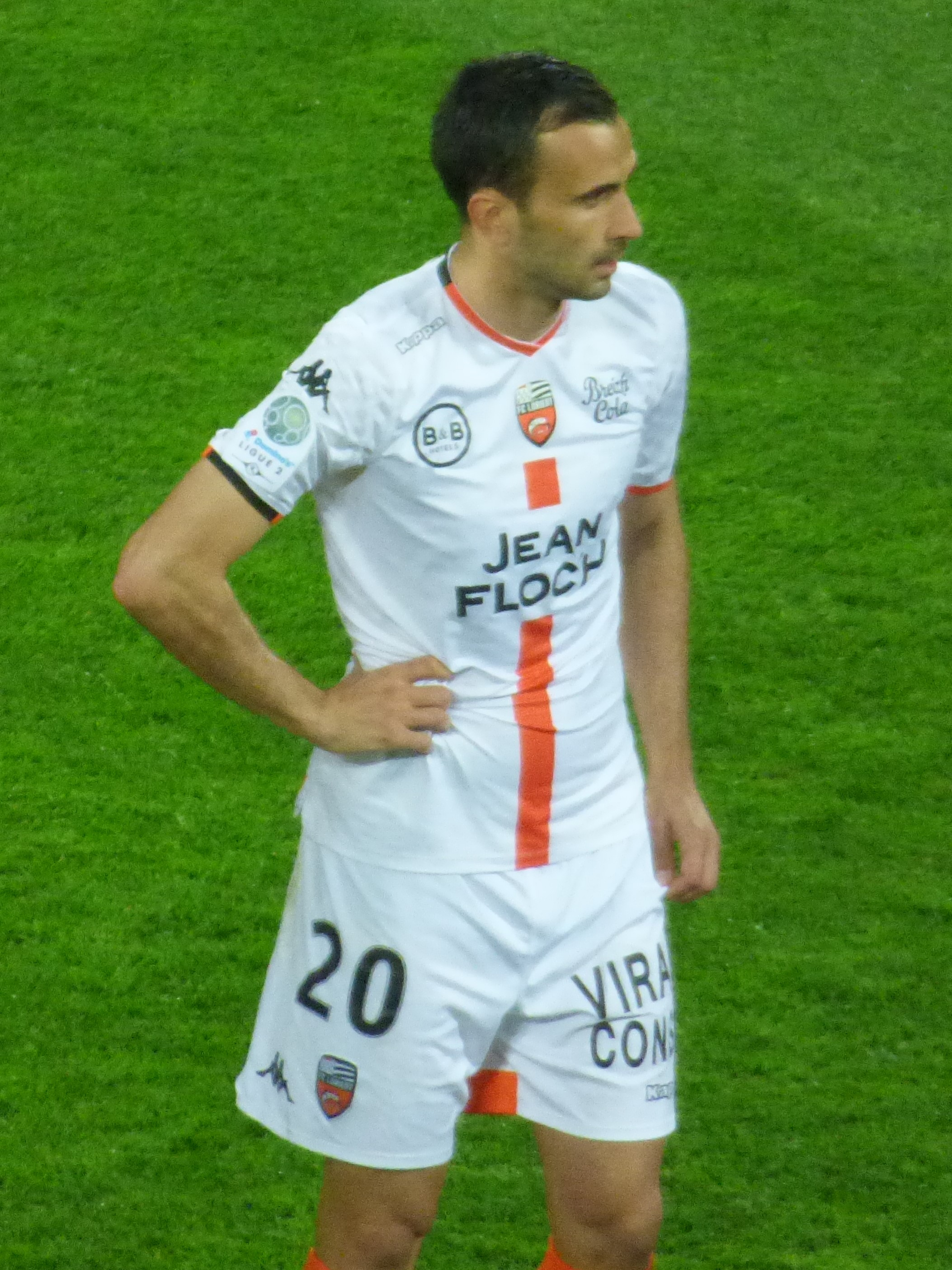

Personal information
- Full name: Matthieu Serge Fernand Saunier
- Date of birth: 7 February 1990 (age 36)
- Place of birth: Hyères, France
- Height: 1.81 m (5 ft 11 in)
- Position: Centre back

Youth career
- Carqueiranne-la Crau
- 2003–2009: Bordeaux

Senior career*
Years	Team	Apps	(Gls)
2009–2011	Bordeaux	0	(0)
2009–2010	→ Rodez (loan)	25	(2)
2010–2011	→ Troyes (loan)	13	(0)
2011–2016	Troyes	111	(6)
2013	Troyes B	5	(1)
2016–2018	Granada	44	(1)
2018–2021	Lorient	41	(1)

International career^{‡}
2006–2007	France U17	10	(0)
2011	France U20	2	(0)
- * Club domestic league appearances and goals as of 23 May 2021 ‡ National team caps and goals as of 02:37, 26 September 2015 (UTC)

Matthieu Serge Fernand Saunier (born 7 February 1990) is a French professional footballer who plays as a central defender.

== Club career ==
Saunier previously played for Bordeaux, where he began his professional career. Immediately after signing his professional contract, Saunier was loaned to Championnat National club Rodez. After a season there, for the second consecutive season, he was loaned out, this time to Troyes. After a successful campaign in which he became the "leader of the defense", the move was made permanent in June 2011.

On 4 August 2016, Saunier signed for La Liga club Granada CF.

== International career ==
Saunier is a French youth international, having represented his nation at under-17 and under-20 level. In 2007, he was a part of the under-17 team that played at both the 2007 UEFA European Under-17 Football Championship and 2007 FIFA U-17 World Cup.
