= Alois Confais =

French footballer (born 1996)

Personal information
- Date of birth: 9 July 1996 (age 30)
- Place of birth: Évreux, France
- Height: 1.74 m (5 ft 9 in)
- Position: Midfielder

Team information
- Current team: Ethnikos Achna
- Number: 27

Youth career
- 2002–2009: Évreux AC
- 2009–2011: Évreux
- 2011–2015: Troyes

Senior career*
Years	Team	Apps	(Gls)
2013–2018	Troyes B	59	(0)
2015–2018	Troyes	65	(1)
2018–2020	Le Mans	39	(2)
2020–2021	Nea Salamina	35	(0)
2021–2022	Olympiakos Nicosia	25	(0)
2022–2025	Le Havre	14	(0)
2025–	Ethnikos Achna	31	(0)

International career
2013	France U18	1	(0)
2015–2016	France U20	7	(0)
- * Club domestic league appearances and goals as of 14 June 2026

Alois Confais (born 7 September 1996) is a French professional footballer who plays as a midfielder for Cypriot club Ethnikos Achna.

== Career ==
Confais made his professional debut on 28 October 2015 in the Coupe de la Ligue against Troyes. He played the full game, which ended in a 2–1 away defeat. On 24 November 2018, Confais joined Championnat National side Le Mans after seven years with Troyes.

Having not been retained by Le Mans in 2020, Confais joined up with former Le Mans teammate Vincent Créhin at Cypriot club Nea Salamis Famagusta FC.

On 17 August 2022, Confais signed a two-year contract with Le Havre.

== Career statistics ==
As of match played 5 January 2025

Appearances and goals by club, season and competition
Club	Season	League			Cup		Coupe de la Ligue		Other		Total	
Club	Season	Division	Apps	Goals	Apps	Goals	Apps	Goals	Apps	Goals	Apps	Goals
Troyes B	2012–13	National 3	3	0	—		—		—		3	0
Troyes B	2013–14	National 3	9	0	—		—		—		9	0
Troyes B	2014–15	CFA 2	29	0	—		—		—		29	0
Troyes B	2015–16	CFA 2	9	0	—		—		—		9	0
Troyes B	2016–17	National 3	2	0	—		—		—		2	0
Troyes B	2017–18	National 3	6	0	—		—		—		6	0
Troyes B	2018–19	National 3	1	0	—		—		—		1	0
Troyes B	Total		59	0	—		—		—		59	0
Troyes	2015–16	Ligue 1	15	0	2	0	0	0	1 (Note: Appearance in Ligue 1 relegation/promotion play-offs)	0	18	0
Troyes	2016–17	Ligue 2	30	1	2	0	1	0	2	0	35	1
Troyes	2017–18	Ligue 1	15	0	3	0	1	0	—		19	0
Troyes	2018–19	Ligue 2	5	0	0	0	3	0	—		8	0
Troyes	Total		65	1	7	0	5	0	3	0	80	1
Le Mans	2018–19	Championnat National	19	1	0	0	0	0	2 (Note: Appearances in promotion play-offs)	0	21	1
Le Mans	2019–20	Ligue 2	20	1	2	0	4	0	—		26	1
Le Mans	Total		39	2	2	0	4	0	2	0	47	2
Nea Salamis	2020–21	Cypriot First Division	35	0	3	0	—		—		38	0
Olympiakos Nicosia	2021–22	Cypriot First Division	25	0	2	0	—		—		27	0
Le Havre	2022–23	Ligue 2	11	0	1	0	—		—		12	0
Le Havre	2023–24	Ligue 1	2	0	3	0	—		—		5	0
Le Havre	2024–25	Ligue 1	1	0	1	0	—		—		2	0
Le Havre	Total		14	0	4	0	—		—		18	0
Career total			237	3	19	0	9	0	5	0	270	3
