= Carlens Arcus =

Haitian footballer (born 1996)

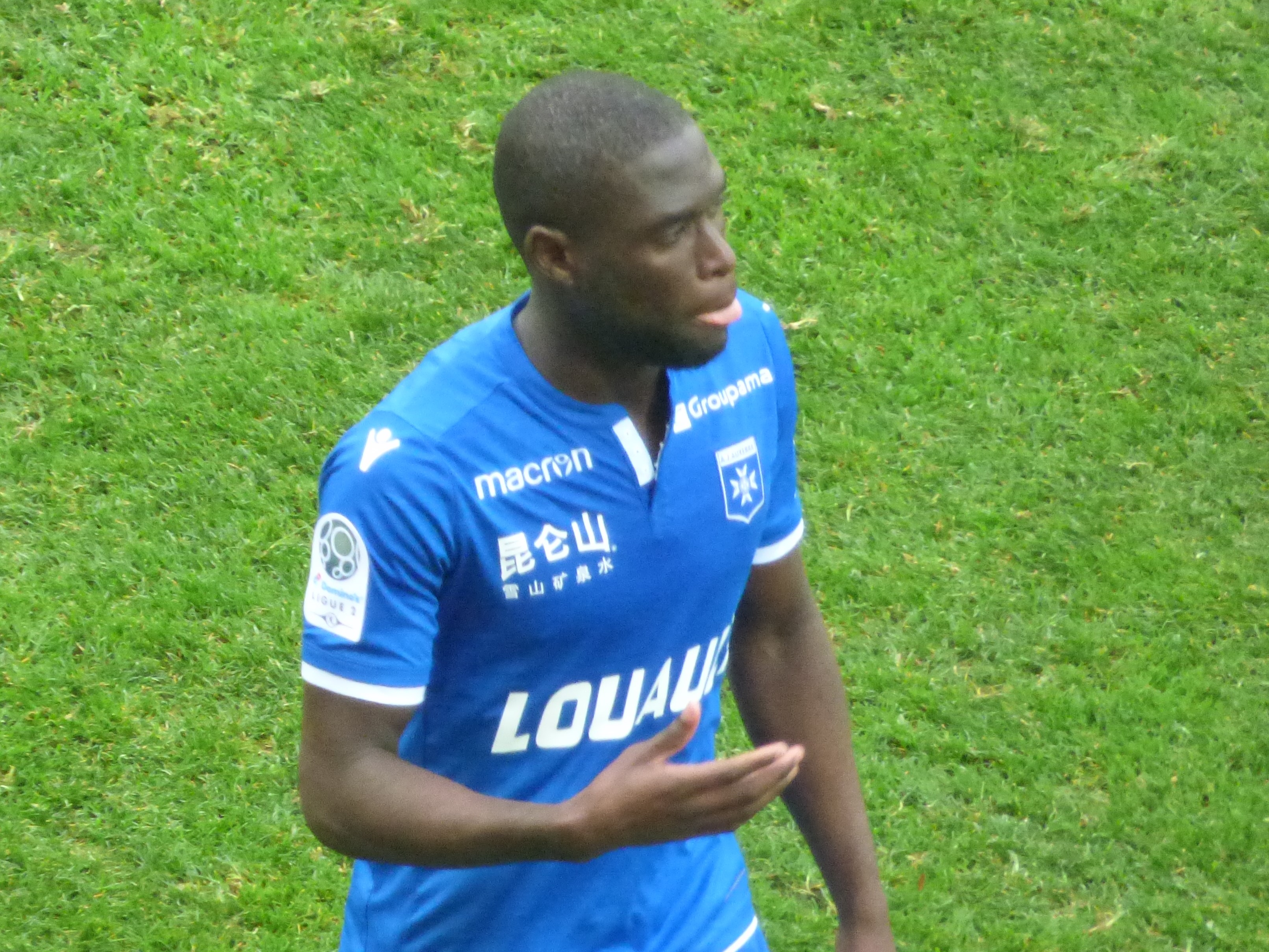
- Arcus with Auxerre in 2019

Personal information
- Date of birth: 28 June 1996 (age 30)
- Place of birth: Port-au-Prince, Haiti
- Height: 1.80 m (5 ft 11 in)
- Position: Right-back

Team information
- Current team: Angers
- Number: 2

Youth career
- 2011–2012: Olé Brasil

Senior career*
Years	Team	Apps	(Gls)
2013	Racing CH		
2014	Club Sportif Saint-Louis		
2015–2016	Troyes B	25	(0)
2015–2016	Troyes	2	(0)
2016–2017	Lille B	19	(1)
2016–2017	Lille	0	(0)
2017–2018	Cercle Brugge	0	(0)
2017–2018	→ Auxerre (loan)	30	(0)
2018–2022	Auxerre	122	(3)
2019	Auxerre B	1	(0)
2022–2024	Vitesse	60	(1)
2024–	Angers	58	(1)

International career^{‡}
2016–	Haiti	63	(1)
- * Club domestic league appearances and goals as of 20 September 2026 ‡ National team caps and goals as of 08:08, 4 October 2026 (UTC)

Carlens Arcus (born 28 June 1996) is a Haitian professional footballer who plays as a right-back for Ligue 1 club Angers and the Haiti national team.

== Club career ==
When Arcus was about 15–16 years of age, he travelled to São Paulo, Brazil, and played for a Série D club, where he learned Portuguese. In 2014, he returned to Haiti and played for top-tier Racing Club Haïtien and then for Club Sportif Saint-Louis of the second division.

Arcus played for Troyes in Ligue 1 in 2015, until signing with Lille in 2016.

On 23 June 2022, Arcus signed a three-year contract with Vitesse in the Netherlands.

On 27 June 2024, Arcus signed for Ligue 1 club Angers on a two-year deal.

== International career ==
As an international footballer, he earned his first cap for Haiti on 2 September 2016 in a match against Costa Rica during 2018 FIFA World Cup qualification. He also participated in 2017 Caribbean Cup qualification, including a match against French Guiana that was not recognized by FIFA.

On 10 October 2017, he provided an assist in Haiti's 3–3 draw against Japan.

On 18 May 2018, he was selected to face Argentina in an international friendly held in Buenos Aires on 29 May. He started the match as Haiti suffered a 4–0 defeat.

On 11 September 2018, he scored his first international goal in a 13–0 victory over Sint Maarten during the 2019–20 CONCACAF Nations League qualifying competition.

In 2019, he reached the semi-finals of the 2019 CONCACAF Gold Cup, making four appearances during the tournament.

On 15 May 2026, he was included in Haiti head coach Sébastien Migné's 26-man squad for the 2026 FIFA World Cup.

== Career statistics ==
=== Club ===
As of match played 20 September 2026

Appearances and goals by club, season and competition
Club	Season	League			Cup		Other		Total	
Club	Season	Division	Apps	Goals	Apps	Goals	Apps	Goals	Apps	Goals
Troyes B	2014–15	CFA	8	0	—		—		8	0
Troyes B	2015–16	CFA	17	0	—		—		17	0
Troyes B	Total		25	0	—		—		25	0
Troyes	2014–15	Ligue 2	1	0	0	0	0	0	1	0
Troyes	2015–16	Ligue 1	1	0	0	0	0	0	1	0
Troyes	Total		2	0	0	0	0	0	2	0
Lille B	2016–17	CFA	19	1	—		—		19	1
Lille	2016–17	Ligue 1	0	0	4	0	0	0	4	0
Cercle Brugge	2017–18	First Division B	0	0	1	0	—		1	0
Auxerre (loan)	2017–18	Ligue 2	30	0	3	0	0	0	33	0
Auxerre	2018–19	Ligue 2	28	2	0	0	2 (Note: Appearances in the Coupe de la Ligue)	0	30	2
Auxerre	2019–20	Ligue 2	24	0	1	0	0	0	25	0
Auxerre	2020–21	Ligue 2	38	0	0	0	0	0	38	0
Auxerre	2021–22	Ligue 2	32	1	1	0	2 (Note: Appearances in the Ligue 1 relegation/promotion play-offs)	0	35	1
Auxerre	Total		122	3	2	0	4	0	128	3
Auxerre B	2018–19	National 3	1	0	—		—		1	0
Vitesse	2022–23	Eredivisie	30	1	1	0	—		31	1
Vitesse	2023–24	Eredivisie	30	0	1	0	—		31	0
Vitesse	Total		60	1	2	0	0	0	62	1
Angers	2024–25	Ligue 1	28	0	2	0	—		30	0
Angers	2025–26	Ligue 1	26	0	2	0	—		28	0
Angers	2026–27	Ligue 1	5	1	0	0	—		5	1
Angers	Total		58	1	4	0	—		62	1
Career total			318	6	16	0	4	0	338	6

=== International ===
As of match played 4 October 2026

Appearances and goals by national team and year
National team	Year	Apps	Goals
Haiti	2016	4	0
Haiti	2017	2	0
Haiti	2018	4	1
Haiti	2019	10	0
Haiti	2021	7	0
Haiti	2022	3	0
Haiti	2023	7	0
Haiti	2024	6	0
Haiti	2025	11	0
Haiti	2026	8	0
Total		62	1

Scores and results list Haiti's goal tally first, score column indicates score after each Arcus goal.

List of international goals scored by Carlens Arcus
No.	Date	Venue	Opponent	Score	Result	Competition
1	10 September 2018	Stade Sylvio Cator, Port-au-Prince, Haiti	Sint Maarten	7–0	13–0	2019–20 CONCACAF Nations League qualification

== Honours ==
Individual

- Eredivisie Team of the Month: January 2023,
