= Stéphane Darbion =

French footballer (born 1984)

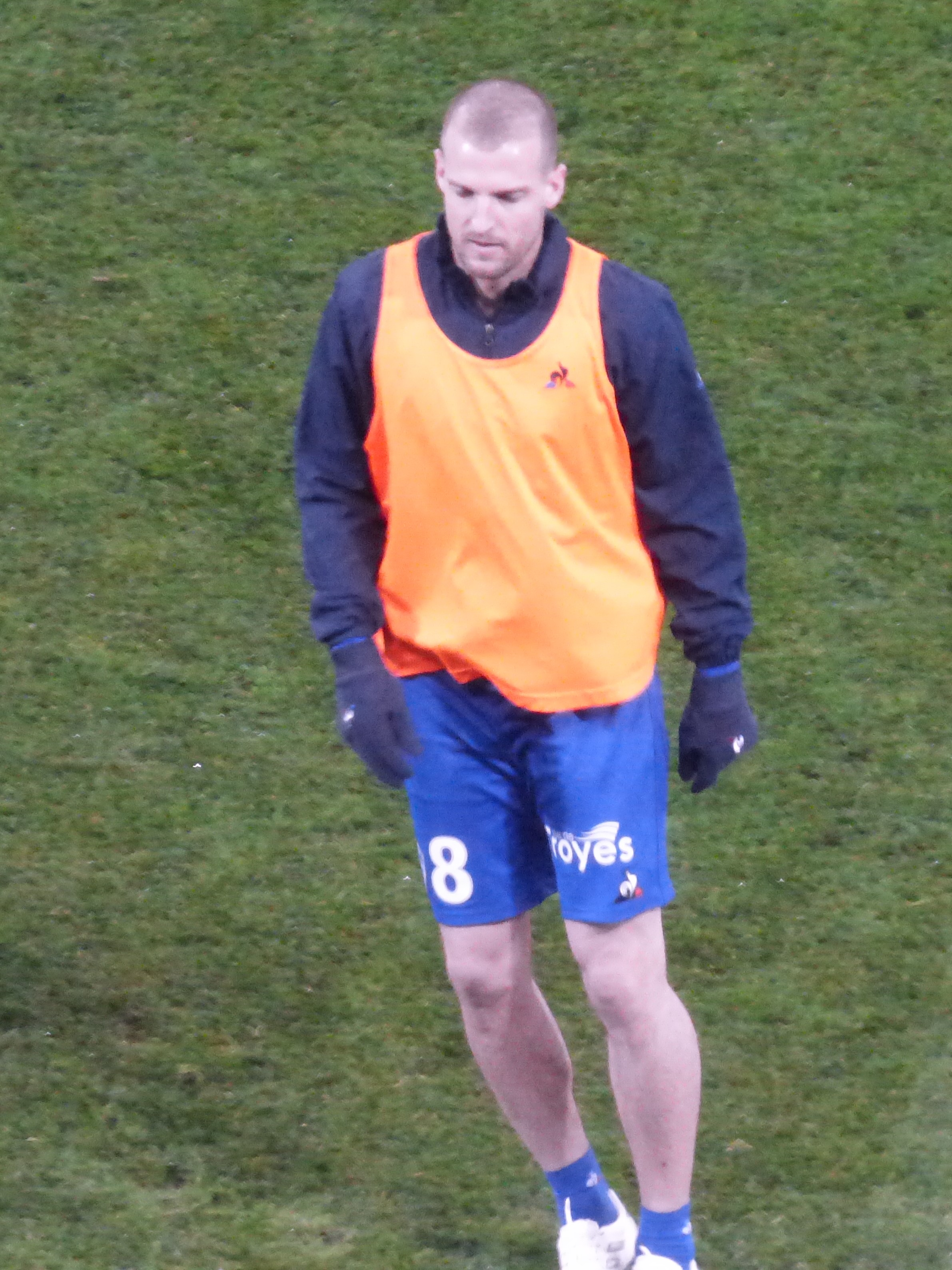
- RC Lens / ES Troyes AC match, 2020

Personal information
- Date of birth: 22 March 1984 (age 42)
- Place of birth: Belley, France
- Height: 1.81 m (5 ft 11 in)
- Position: Midfielder

Team information
- Current team: Troyes B (assistant)

Youth career
- Montpellier

Senior career*
Years	Team	Apps	(Gls)
2002–2007	Montpellier	70	(4)
2007–2009	Ajaccio	68	(11)
2009–2011	Nantes	58	(7)
2011	Olympiacos Volos	4	(0)
2011–2012	Skoda Xanthi	13	(0)
2012–2020	Troyes	193	(26)

Managerial career
- 2020–2021: Troyes (assistant)
- 2021–: Troyes B (assistant)
- * Club domestic league appearances and goals

Stéphane Darbion (born 22 March 1984) is a former French professional footballer.

== Career ==
Born in Belley, Ain, Darbion began his career with HSC Montpellier and was promoted in 2003 to the Ligue 2 senior side. In July 2007, after four years with the first team, during which he had made 70 appearances scoring four goals, he joined to AC Ajaccio.

On 12 June 2009, he signed for FC Nantes from AC Ajaccio on a two-year deal.

In summer 2012, after one season in Greece, Darbion signed a two-season contract with Troyes AC, newly promoted to French Ligue 1.

== Coaching career ==
After retiring at the end of the 2019-20 season, Darbion stayed at Troyes AC in a different role: he was appointed assistant coach of manager Laurent Batlles.

== Career statistics ==
As of 1 July 2019

Appearances and goals by club, season and competition
Club	Season	League			Cup		League Cup		Other		Total	
Club	Season	Division	Apps	Goals	Apps	Goals	Apps	Goals	Apps	Goals	Apps	Goals
Ajaccio	2008–09	Ligue 2	33	7	0	0	0	0	0	0	33	7
Nantes	2009–10	Ligue 2	36	6	0	0	1	0	0	0	37	6
Nantes	2010–11	Ligue 2	22	1	3	0	0	0	0	0	25	1
Nantes	Total		58	7	3	0	1	0	0	0	62	7
Xanthi	2011–12	Super League Greece	13	0	2	0	—		0	0	15	0
Troyes	2012–13	Ligue 1	31	4	2	0	1	0	0	0	34	4
Troyes	2013–14	Ligue 2	32	7	0	0	6	0	0	0	38	7
Troyes	2014–15	Ligue 2	30	6	0	0	1	1	0	0	31	7
Troyes	2015–16	Ligue 1	26	1	2	0	0	0	0	0	28	1
Troyes	2016–17	Ligue 2	38	5	1	0	1	0	2 (Note: Appearances in Relegation/Promotion play-offs)	1	42	6
Troyes	2017–18	Ligue 1	23	3	2	0	0	0	0	0	25	3
Troyes	2018–19	Ligue 2	7	0	0	0	0	0	0	0	7	0
Troyes	2019–20	Ligue 2	0	0	0	0	0	0	0	0	0	0
Troyes	Total		187	26	7	0	9	1	2	1	205	28
Troyes II	2014–15	CFA	1	1	—						1	1
Troyes II	2018–19	Championnat National 3	2	0	—						2	0
Troyes II	Total		3	1	0	0	0	0	0	0	3	1
Career total			294	41	12	0	10	1	2	1	318	43
