= Thomas Ayasse =

French footballer (born 1987)

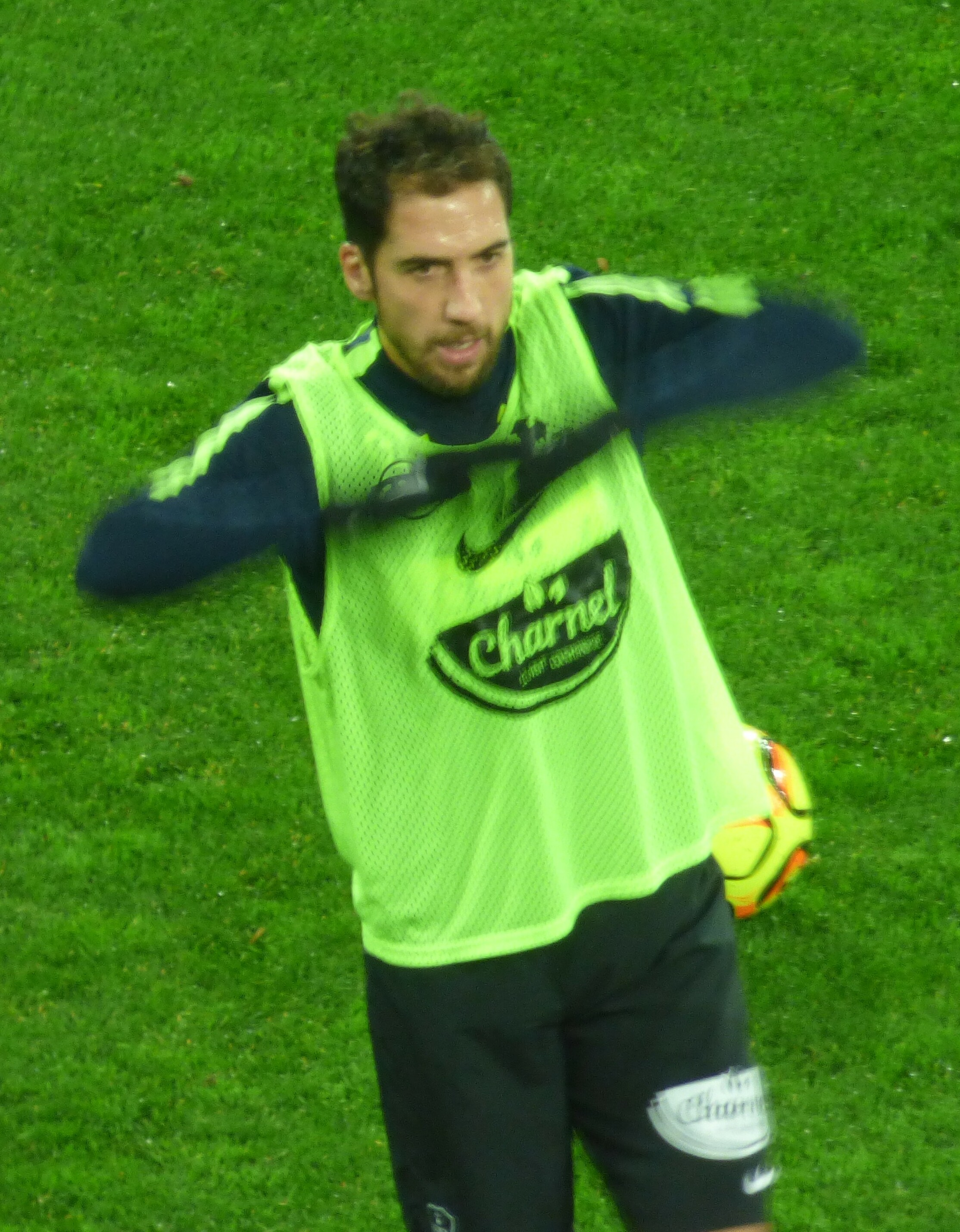
- Ayasse in 2018

Personal information
- Date of birth: 17 February 1987 (age 39)
- Place of birth: Toulouse, France
- Height: 1.83 m (6 ft 0 in)
- Position: Midfielder

Team information
- Current team: FCM Troyes (player & president)

Youth career
- Toulouse

Senior career*
Years	Team	Apps	(Gls)
2003–2008	Toulouse B	47	(4)
2007–2008	→ Reims (loan)	30	(0)
2008–2009	Cannes	32	(3)
2009–2012	Arles-Avignon	95	(11)
2012–2014	Nancy	52	(2)
2014–2016	Troyes	48	(4)
2016–2018	Le Havre	79	(1)
2018–2019	Brest	26	(1)
2020–	FCM Troyes		
- * Club domestic league appearances and goals as of 21:32, 16 August 2020 (UTC)

Thomas Ayasse (born 17 February 1987) is a French professional footballer who plays as a midfielder for FCM Troyes. He is also the president of the club.

== Career ==
On 1 June 2012, Ayasse signed a three-year deal with Nancy of the French Ligue 1.

On 25 June 2014, Ayasse moved to the Ligue 2 side Troyes on a three-year deal.

In January 2016, Ayasse quit struggling Troyes and signed for Le Havre.

In June 2020, after a year without club, Ayasse signed with French amateur team FCM Troyes. A year after his arrival, in June 2021, Ayasse was named president of the club. However, he would still continue as an active player.
