= Yohan Betsch =

French professional footballer (born 1987)

Personal information
- Full name: Yohan Betsch
- Date of birth: 16 February 1987 (age 39)
- Place of birth: Argenteuil, France
- Height: 1.85 m (6 ft 1 in)
- Position: Midfielder

Senior career*
Years	Team	Apps	(Gls)
2006–2008	Metz B	54	(2)
2008–2010	Créteil	67	(2)
2010–2011	Strasbourg	10	(0)
2011–2012	Metz	20	(1)
2011–2012	Metz B	5	(1)
2012–2013	Laval	22	(0)
2013–2015	Clermont	42	(0)
2014–2015	Clermont B	10	(0)
2015–2017	Tubize	38	(0)
2017–2020	Annecy FC	47	(0)
- * Club domestic league appearances and goals as of 09:29, 14 June 2020 (UTC)

Yohan Betsch (born 16 February 1987) is a French professional footballer as of 2020 who plays as a midfielder. He started his career with Metz, but did not make a first-team appearance for the club before leaving to join Créteil in 2008. After spending two seasons with Créteil, Betsch signed for Strasbourg. He returned to Metz at the start of the 2011–12 season, but left to join Laval the following summer.

== Career ==
Betsch started his career in the reserve team at Metz and made a total of 54 appearances in the Championnat de France amateur between 2006 and 2008, scoring twice. He joined Championnat National club Créteil in the summer of 2008 and made his debut in the goalless draw at home to Calais on 2 August. He went on to play in all 38 National matches for Créteil during the 2008–09 season, and scored his first goal for the club in the 1–1 draw with Pacy-sur-Eure on 4 March 2009. Betsch was again a regular starter during the first half of his second season with Créteil, but he then spent some time out of the side due to injury before returning for the game against Cannes on 24 April 2010. In total, he made 67 league appearances during his two-year spell at the Stade Dominique Duvauchelle.

On 2 July 2010, Betsch signed for recently relegated National outfit Strasbourg. However, eight days later he ruptured ligaments in his left knee during a pre-season friendly match against German club Koblenz, an injury which required an operation and ruled him out for around six months. Betsch eventually made his Strasbourg debut on 25 February 2011, playing the first half of the 1–1 draw away at Gap before being substituted for Loïc Damour. He went on to play a total of 10 matches during the remainder of the 2010–11 season, two of them as a substitute, as the team finished fourth in the National.

Despite their fourth-placed finish, Strasbourg were demoted to the Championnat de France amateur 2 for the 2011–12 season due to financial irregularities. Many players subsequently left the club, including Betsch, who returned to his first club, Metz, on 7 June 2011. He played his first senior match for the club on 26 August 2011, almost five years after making his debut for the reserves, coming on as a late replacement for Mahamane Traoré in the 1–1 draw away at Sedan. He then spent more than two months out of the first-team, although he did make three appearances for the B team during that period.

Betsch was recalled to the senior team and handed his first start for Metz on 5 November 2011 as the team secured a 1–0 victory away at Boulogne. The match marked the beginning of eight consecutive starts for Betsch, which continued into January 2012. On 18 January 2012, he scored his first Ligue 2 goal for Metz, netting the equaliser three minutes into injury time in the 1–1 draw away to Châteauroux. Following Metz's relegation to the Championnat National at the end of the 2011–12 season, Betsch joined Ligue 2 side Laval on 19 June 2012.

== Career statistics ==
As of match played 3 February 2018

Appearances and goals by club, season and competition
Club	Season	League			Coupe de France		Coupe de la Ligue		Total	
Club	Season	Division	Apps	Goals	Apps	Goals	Apps	Goals	Apps	Goals
Metz B	2006–07	CFA	24	3	—		—		24	3
Metz B	2007–08	CFA	30	2	—		—		30	2
Metz B	Total		54	5	—		—		54	5
Créteil	2008–09	National	38	1	5	0	3	0	46	1
Créteil	2009–10	National	29	1	1	0	—		30	1
Créteil	Total		67	2	6	0	3	0	76	2
Strasbourg	2010–11	National	10	0	0	0	0	0	10	0
Metz	2011–12	Ligue 2	20	1	3	1	0	0	23	2
Metz B	2011–12	CFA	5	1	—		—		5	1
Laval	2012–13	Ligue 2	22	0	3	0	0	0	25	0
Clermont	2013–14	Ligue 2	26	0	0	0	2	2	28	2
Clermont	2014–15	Ligue 2	16	0	1	0	3	0	20	0
Clermont	Total		42	0	1	0	5	2	48	2
Clermont B	2013–14	CFA 2	3	0	—		—		3	0
Clermont B	2014–15	CFA 2	7	0	—		—		7	0
Clermont B	Total		10	0	—		—		10	0
Tubize	2015–16	Second Division	7	0	1	0	—		8	0
Tubize	2016–17	First Division B	31	0	2	0	—		33	0
Tubize	Total		38	0	3	0	—		41	0
Annecy	2017–18	National 2	17	0	1	0	—		18	0
Career total			247	6	14	1	8	2	269	9
