= Johan Martial =

French footballer (born 1991)

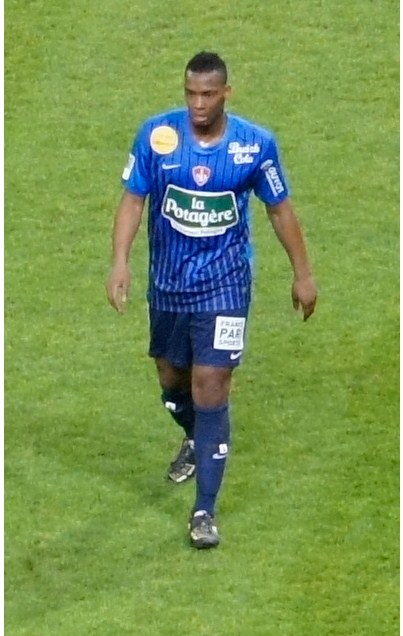
- Martial with Brest in 2012

Personal information
- Date of birth: 30 May 1991 (age 35)
- Place of birth: Massy, France
- Height: 1.84 m (6 ft 0 in)
- Position: Centre back

Youth career
- 1997–2003: Les Ulis
- 2003–2005: Paris Saint-Germain
- 2005–2006: Antony Sports
- 2006–2007: AS Montferrand
- 2007–2009: Bastia

Senior career*
Years	Team	Apps	(Gls)
2009–2011	Bastia	29	(0)
2010–2011	→ Brest (loan)	7	(1)
2011–2015	Brest	64	(1)
2015–2017	Troyes	27	(3)
2017–2019	Maccabi Petah Tikva	36	(2)
2019	Ashdod	0	(0)
2019–2020	Panetolikos	16	(1)
2020–2021	Sochaux	10	(0)
2022	Sri Pahang	7	(0)

International career
2009–2010	France U19	10	(0)
2010–2012	France U20	3	(1)
- * Club domestic league appearances and goals as of 15 May 2021

Johan Martial (born 30 May 1991) is a French professional footballer who plays as a centre-back. He was a France youth international for the under-19 and under-20 teams.

== Club career ==
Martial was born in Massy. He joined SC Bastia after leaving the Auvergne-based outfit AS Montferrand. He received his first call up to the senior squad for their Ligue 2 match against Montpellier on 13 March 2009, and made his professional debut as a late match substitute in the 1–0 victory.

On 2 August 2010, Bastia loaned Martial to fellow Ligue 1 team Brest for the entire 2010–11 Ligue 1 season. The loan deal was made permanent at the end of the season.

In 2015, after his Brest contract expired, Martial moved to Troyes.

On 20 June 2017, after Troyes regained their place in the top flight, Martial moved abroad for the first time by joining Maccabi Petah Tikva F.C. in the Israeli Premier League. In February 2019, he moved across the league to Ashdod.

On 4 July 2019, he signed a two-year contract with Panetolikos, on a free transfer. He left the club on 6 June 2020 to join Sochaux.

In January 2022 he joined Malaysia Super League side Sri Pahang. He was released by the club in mid season due to injuries.

== International career ==
Martial made his international debut for France under-19 on 9 September 2009 in a 3–3 friendly draw away to Japan. He was part of the team that won the 2010 UEFA European Under-19 Championship on home soil, making an appearance in the final group game, a 1–1 draw with England.

== Personal life ==
Johan is of Guadeloupen descent. He is the younger brother of former Les Ulis captain Dorian Martial and the older brother of former Manchester United and France forward Anthony Martial. He is the cousin of Servette midfielder Alexis Martial.

== Honours ==
France under-19

- UEFA European Under-19 Football Championship: 2010
- Greek Cup
