= Rincón (footballer, born 1987) =

Brazilian footballer

Personal information
- Full name: Carlos Eduardo de Castro Lourenço
- Date of birth: 31 May 1987 (age 39)
- Place of birth: São Paulo, Brazil
- Height: 1.86 m (6 ft 1 in)
- Position: Centre back

Youth career
- 2002–2006: São Paulo

Senior career*
Years	Team	Apps	(Gls)
2006–2010	Internazionale	0	(0)
2006–2008	→ Empoli (loan)	0	(0)
2008–2009	→ Ancona (loan)	27	(1)
2009–2010	→ Piacenza (loan)	32	(1)
2010–2011	Chievo	0	(0)
2011	→ Grosseto (loan)	15	(0)
2011–2017	Troyes	103	(4)
2013–2014	Troyes B	7	(0)
2018–2019	Laval B	17	(0)
2018–2019	Laval	7	(0)
2019–2020	KSV Roeselare	2	(0)
- * Club domestic league appearances and goals as of 2 September 2019

Carlos Eduardo de Castro Lourenço (born 31 May 1987), commonly known as Rincón, is a Brazilian footballer who is currently unemployed after most recently playing for KSV Roeselare in the Belgian First Division B as a defender.

== Football career ==
=== Early career ===
From an early age, Rincón was tipped to be the natural successor to Brazilian and Milan defender Cafu. The young right back became known for his attacking flair and soon signed a pre-contract with Manchester United, where he was expected to progress at a quick rate. Rincón stayed in São Paulo and signed a three-year contract in June 2003. New FIFA rules, which came into effect in January 2004, prevented international transfers of players under-18, thus he was unable to obtain a work permit. Rincón never joined Manchester United and later left for Internazionale (via Empoli).

=== Italy ===
In the summer of 2006, Rincon moved to Italian Serie A side Empoli, like Maxwell, Rincon officially became Internazionale player at the mid of season as Empoli borrow the non-EU registration quota.

Rincón remained on loan for the rest of the 2006–07 season. He played two matches for Empoli in the Coppa Italia. In the 2007–08 season, he played in two UEFA Cup matches.

In summer 2008, he left for A.C. Ancona on loan, followed the next year by a loan move to Piacenza.

On the last day of the 2010 transfer window, Rincon joined Chievo in a co-ownership deal with Inter, but after only 6 months, he was loaned out to Serie B side, Grosseto.

=== France ===
On 18 August 2011, he signed a two-year contract with French Ligue 2 outfit Troyes AC.
