= Yoann Court =

French professional footballer (born 1990)

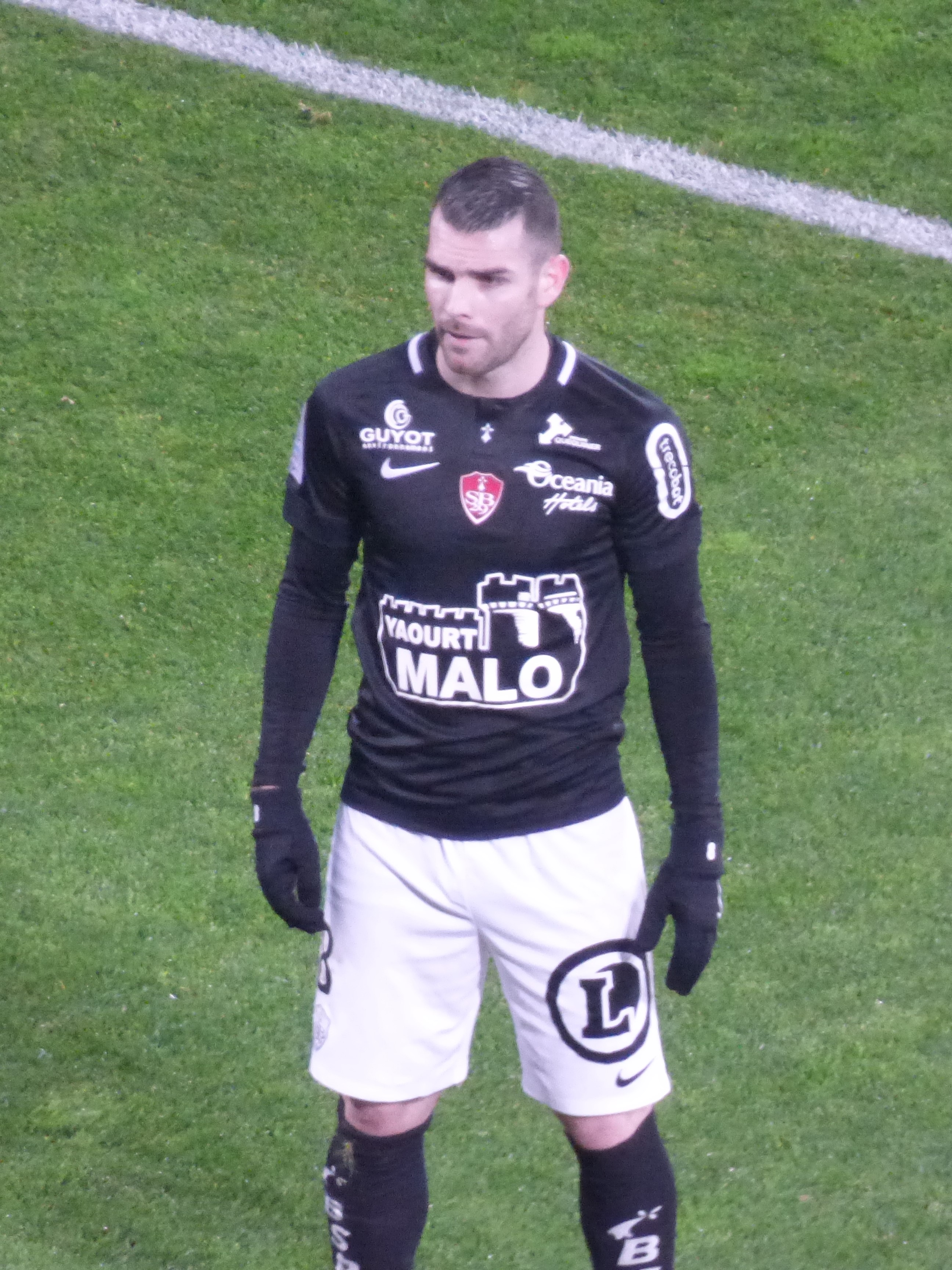
- Court with Brest in 2018

Personal information
- Date of birth: 14 January 1990 (age 36)
- Place of birth: Carpentras, France
- Height: 1.72 m (5 ft 8 in)
- Position: Left winger

Team information
- Current team: ES Doubs

Youth career
- 1996–1999: FC Carpentras
- 1993–2003: MJC Avignon
- 2003–2005: Avignonnais 84
- 2005–2010: Lyon

Senior career*
Years	Team	Apps	(Gls)
2008–2010	Lyon B	41	(6)
2010–2013	Sedan	74	(11)
2013–2016	Troyes	80	(3)
2016–2017	Gazélec Ajaccio	50	(7)
2018	Bourg-Péronnas	17	(4)
2018–2020	Brest	46	(9)
2020–2024	Caen	82	(7)
2022–2023	Caen B	5	(2)
2024–2025	IMT	28	(3)
2025–	ES Doubs	0	(0)

International career
2010	France U20	5	(0)
- * Club domestic league appearances and goals as of 16 October 2025

Yoann Court (born 14 January 1990) is a French professional footballer who plays as a winger for Championnat National 3 Group B club ES Doubs. He has been capped at France U20 level.

== Club career ==
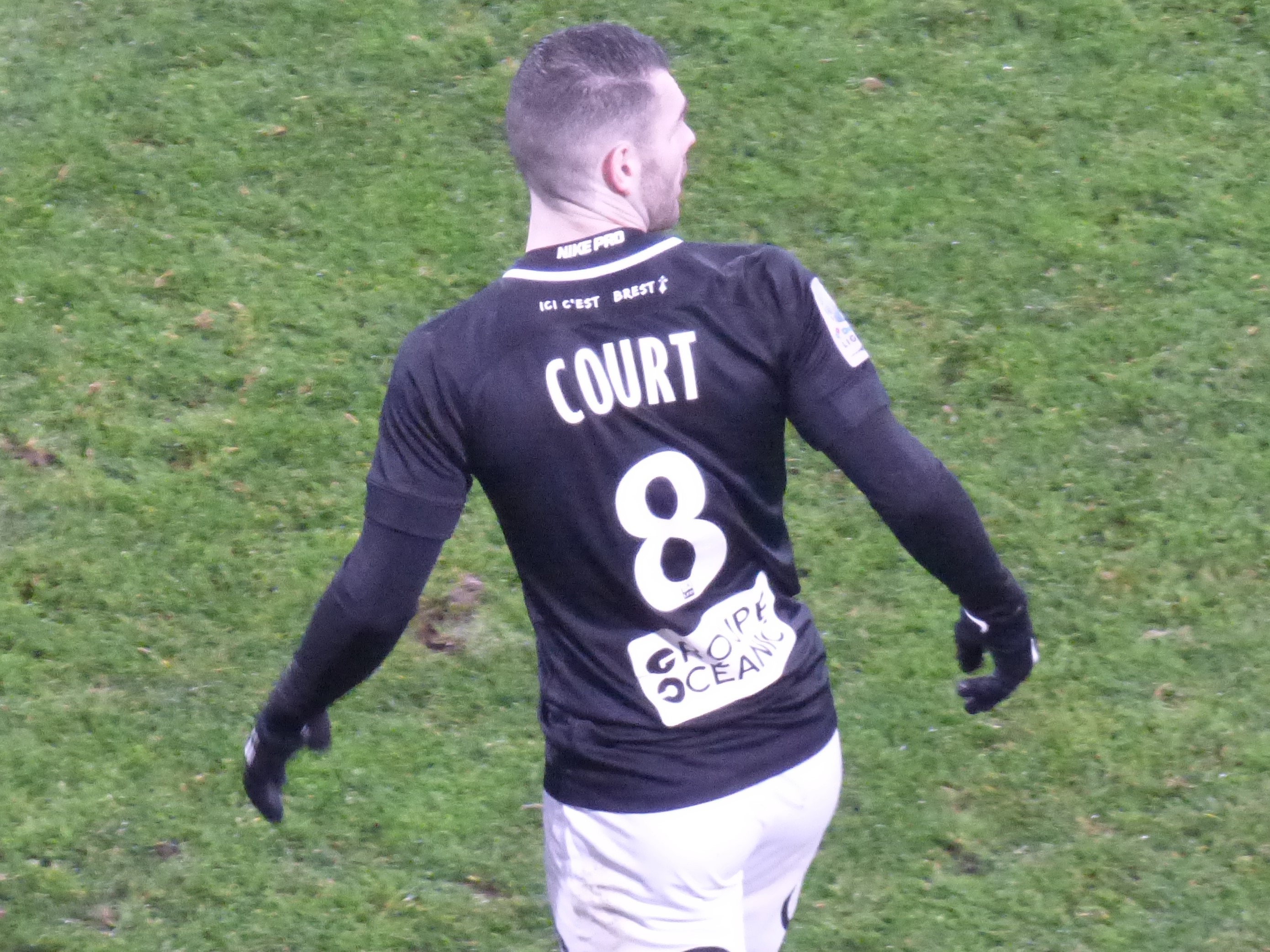
Court in action for Brest in 2018 against RC Lens

Court joined the Lyon youth academy in 2005 and spent five years there before he signed for Sedan on a free transfer in 2010. During the 2010–11 season he played 21 games, scoring 6 goals. In his second season, Court played 22 games and scoring 3 goals in the league, last season Court could not stop Sedan getting relegated from Ligue 2 to the CFA.

In July 2013, Court left Sedan to join recently relegated side Troyes on a three-year deal and was given the number 28 shirt for the 2013–14 season. He continued his career in Gazélec Ajaccio, Bourg-en-Bresse, and Brest from 2016 to 2020.

On 18 September 2020, Court signed a two-year contract with Caen. He chose the number 13 at the club.

In October 2025, Court joined Championnat National 3 Group B club ES Doubs.

== International career ==
Court has been capped at youth levels up to France U20 level.

== Personal life ==
In September 2025, Court was accused of fraud by several football shirt collectors having failed to send out shirts to buyers.

== Career statistics ==
As of 1 July 2024

Appearances and goals by club, season and competition
Club	Season	League			National Cup		League Cup		Other		Total	
Club	Season	Division	Apps	Goals	Apps	Goals	Apps	Goals	Apps	Goals	Apps	Goals
Sedan	2010–11	Ligue 2	21	6	2	0	0	0	—		23	6
Sedan	2011–12	Ligue 2	22	3	0	0	2	1	—		24	4
Sedan	2012–13	Ligue 2	31	2	3	0	1	0	—		35	2
Sedan	Total		74	11	5	0	3	1	0	0	82	12
Troyes	2013–14	Ligue 2	30	2	0	0	6	3	—		36	5
Troyes	2014–15	Ligue 2	25	1	0	0	2	0	—		27	1
Troyes	2015–16	Ligue 1	25	0	3	0	1	0	—		29	0
Troyes	Total		80	3	3	0	9	3	0	0	92	6
Gazélec Ajaccio	2016–17	Ligue 2	35	6	3	2	0	0	—		38	8
Gazélec Ajaccio	2017–18	Ligue 2	15	1	1	0	2	0	—		18	1
Gazélec Ajaccio	Total		50	7	4	2	2	0	0	0	56	9
Bourg-Péronnas	2017–18	Ligue 2	17	4	2	1	0	0	2 (Note: Appearances in the 2018 Ligue 2 play-offs)	0	21	5
Brest	2018–19	Ligue 2	23	6	3	1	0	0	—		26	7
Brest	2019–20	Ligue 1	23	3	1	0	2	0	—		26	3
Brest	Total		46	9	4	1	2	0	0	0	52	10
Caen	2020–21	Ligue 2	28	3	1	0	0	0	—		29	3
Caen	2021–22	Ligue 2	18	2	0	0	0	0	—		18	2
Caen	2022–23	Ligue 2	24	2	1	0	0	0	—		25	2
Caen	2023–24	Ligue 2	12	0	0	0	0	0	—		12	0
Caen	Total		82	7	2	0	0	0	0	0	84	7
Career totals			349	41	20	4	16	4	2	0	387	49
