= Quentin Othon =

French footballer (born 1988)

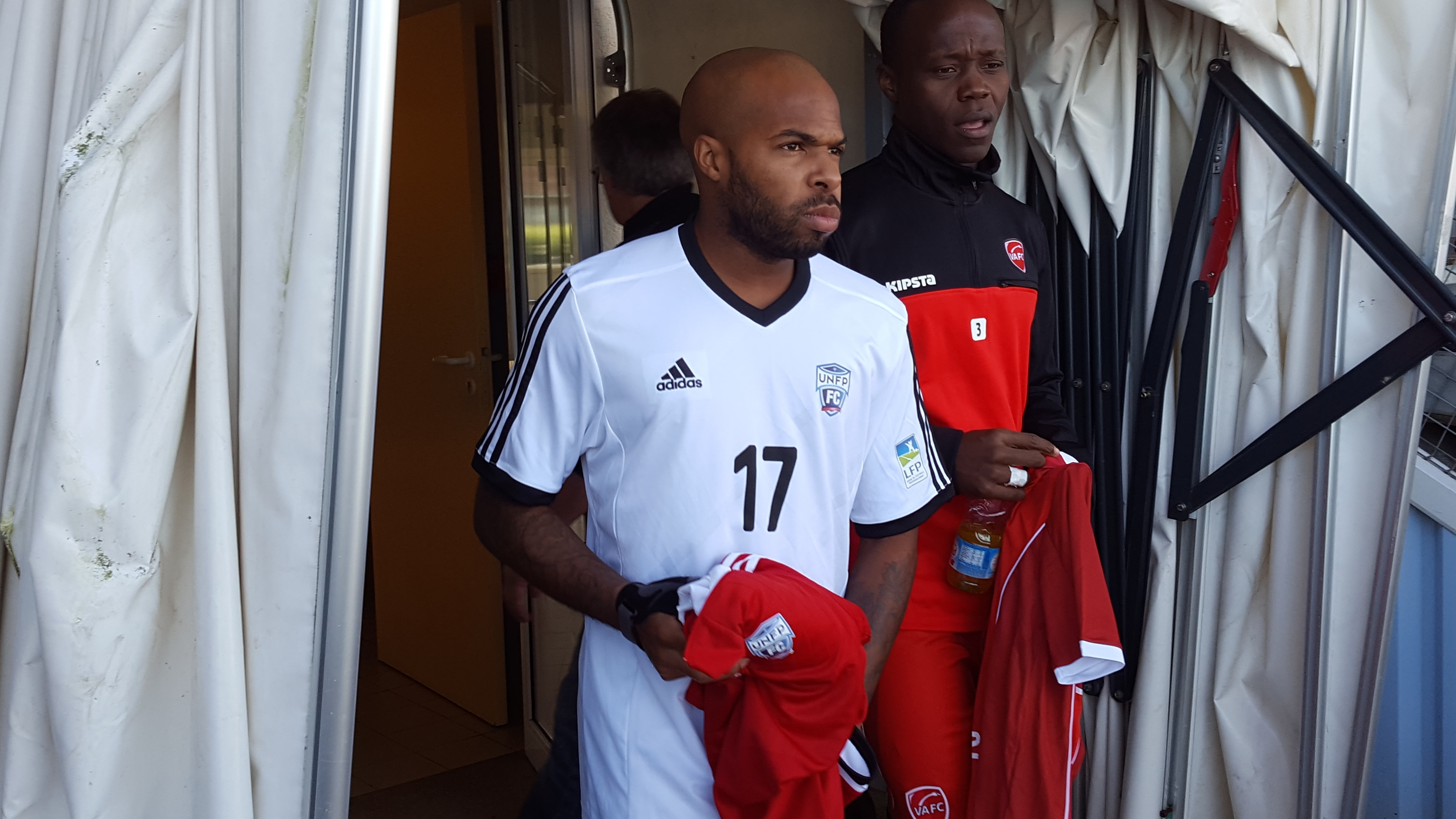
- Othon in 2016

Personal information
- Date of birth: 27 March 1988 (age 38)
- Place of birth: Montreuil, France
- Height: 1.62 m (5 ft 4 in)
- Positions: Midfielder; left-back

Youth career
- 1994–2001: Plessis Belleville
- 2001–2002: Pont St Maxen
- 2002–2003: Compiègne
- 2003–2006: Strasbourg

Senior career*
| Years | Team | Apps | (Gls) |
| 2006–2011 | Strasbourg | 49 | (0) |
| 2010 | → Châteauroux (loan) | 1 | (0) |
| 2011 | → Nantes (loan) | 6 | (0) |
| 2011–2016 | Troyes | 100 | (2) |
| 2016–2021 | Strasbourg II | 77 | (1) |
| Total | | 233 | (3) |

International career
| 2003–2004 | France U16 | | |
| 2004–2005 | France U17 | | |
| 2005–2006 | France U18 | | |
| 2006–2007 | France U19 | | |
| 2009 | France U21 | | |
- * Club domestic league appearances and goals

Quentin Othon (born 27 March 1988) is a French former professional footballer who played as a midfielder or left-back. He represented France at under-16, under-17, under-18, under-19 and under-21 levels.

== Club career ==
=== Strasbourg ===
On 27 July 2007, Othon signed his first professional contract agreeing to a four-year deal with RC Strasbourg until June 2011. He started as a left-back for Strasbourg due to his ability to run and make crosses from the left wing.

==== Châteauroux (loan) ====
On 18 July 2010, Ligue 2 club Châteauroux announced that they had signed Othon from Strasbourg on a season-long loan deal, with the option to make the move permanent at the end of the season. During the winter transfer window, Othon went on loan to another Ligue 2 team for five months.

==== FC Nantes (loan) ====
On 6 January 2011, Ligue 2 club Nantes announced that they had signed Othon from RC Strasbourg on a season-long loan deal, with the option to make the move permanent at the end of the season. He made a total of nine appearances for Nantes in League and played as defensive midfield role.

=== Troyes ===
On 26 August 2011, Ligue 1 club Troyes announced that they had signed Othon from RC Strasbourg on a long-term deal for an undisclosed fee. Othon scored his first goal for Troyes in the 2013–14 season with a stunning left foot shot from outside of the box.

== International career ==
Othon is a French youth international and has represented his nation at the U16, U17, and U18 levels. Othon represented France U21 at the UEFA European Under-21 Championship Qualifiers.
