= Lossémy Karaboué =

French footballer (born 1988)

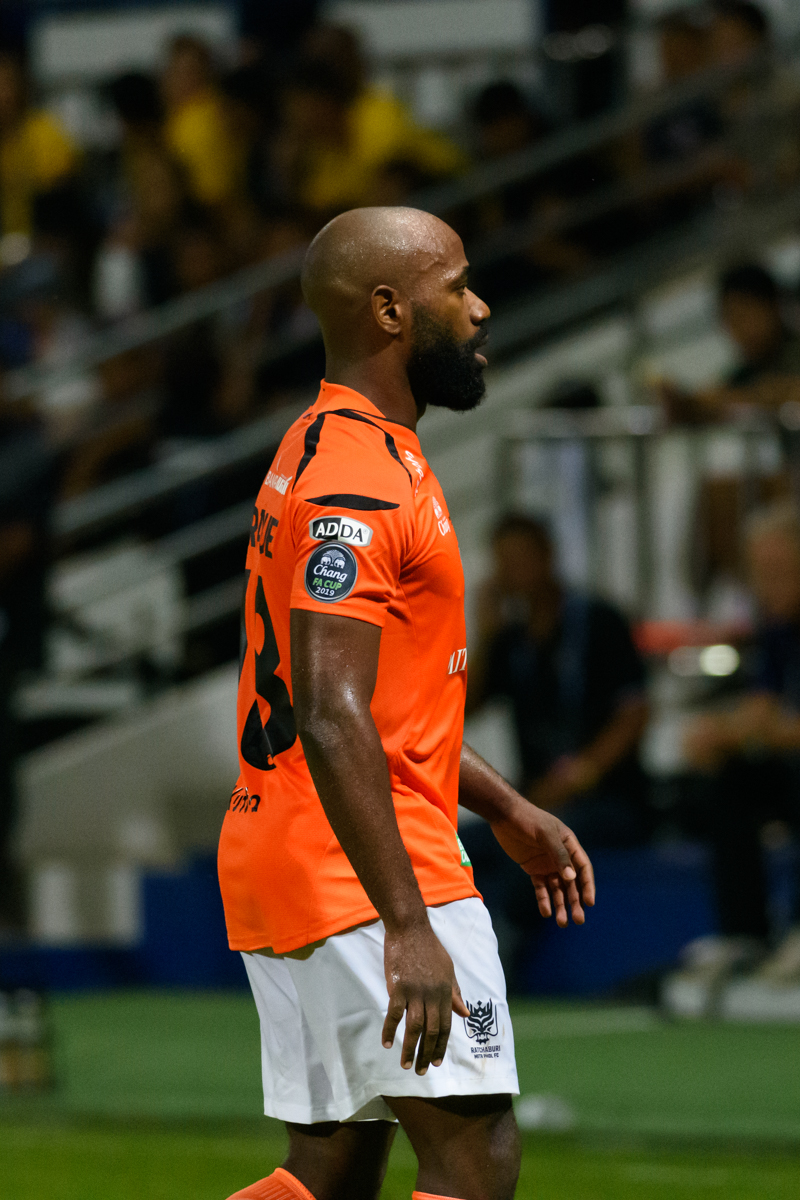
- Karaboué with Ratchaburi Mitr Phol in 2019

Personal information
- Full name: Lossémy Karaboué
- Date of birth: March 18, 1988 (age 38)
- Place of birth: Paris, France
- Height: 1.73 m (5 ft 8 in)
- Position: Midfielder

Team information
- Current team: Khon Kaen United
- Number: 19

Youth career
- 2004–2008: Lyon

Senior career*
Years	Team	Apps	(Gls)
2008–2011	Sedan	90	(15)
2011–2015	Nancy	124	(8)
2015–2016	Troyes	32	(0)
2016–2017	Levadiakos	18	(1)
2017–2018	Valenciennes	27	(2)
2018–2019	Botoșani	23	(0)
2019–2021	Ratchaburi Mitr Phol	40	(5)
2021–2022	Suphanburi	27	(2)
2022–2023	PT Prachuap	14	(4)
2023–	Khon Kaen United	24	(3)
- * Club domestic league appearances and goals as of 22 October 2023

Lossémy Karaboué (born 18 March 1988) is a French footballer who currently plays for Khon Kaen United in the Thai League 1 as a midfielder.

== Club career ==
Karaboué began his career in the youth academy of Olympique Lyonnais. He primarily played with Lyon's CFA squad. After the 2007–08 season, he moved to the Ardennes-based side CS Sedan. He made his professional football debut on 29 August 2008 in a Ligue 2 match against Guingamp coming on as a substitute playing 35 minutes; the match ended in a 1–1 draw. He went on to start the following five matches before being relegated back to the bench as an occasional sub.

Having agreed to a termination of his Troyes contract, Karaboué was linked with Turkish side Kayserispor.
