= Thiago Xavier (footballer, born 1983) =

Brazilian footballer

Personal information
- Full name: Thiago Xavier Rodrigues Corrêa
- Date of birth: 27 December 1983 (age 42)
- Place of birth: Rio de Janeiro, Brazil
- Position: Defensive midfielder

Youth career
- Botafogo

Senior career*
Years	Team	Apps	(Gls)
2004–2006	Botafogo	27	(0)
2007	Cabofriense	0	(0)
2007–2011	Châteauroux	121	(1)
2011–2017	Troyes	106	(7)
2013–2017	→ Troyes B	15	(0)
2017–2019	Valenciennes	20	(0)
- * Club domestic league appearances and goals

Thiago Xavier Rodrigues Corrêa (born 27 December 1983) is a Brazilian former professional footballer who played as a defensive midfielder.

He formerly played for Botafogo and Cabofriense. In January 2007, he left for Ligue 2 side Châteauroux.

He acquired French nationality by naturalization in 2008.
