= Benjamin Nivet =

French former professional footballer (born 1977)

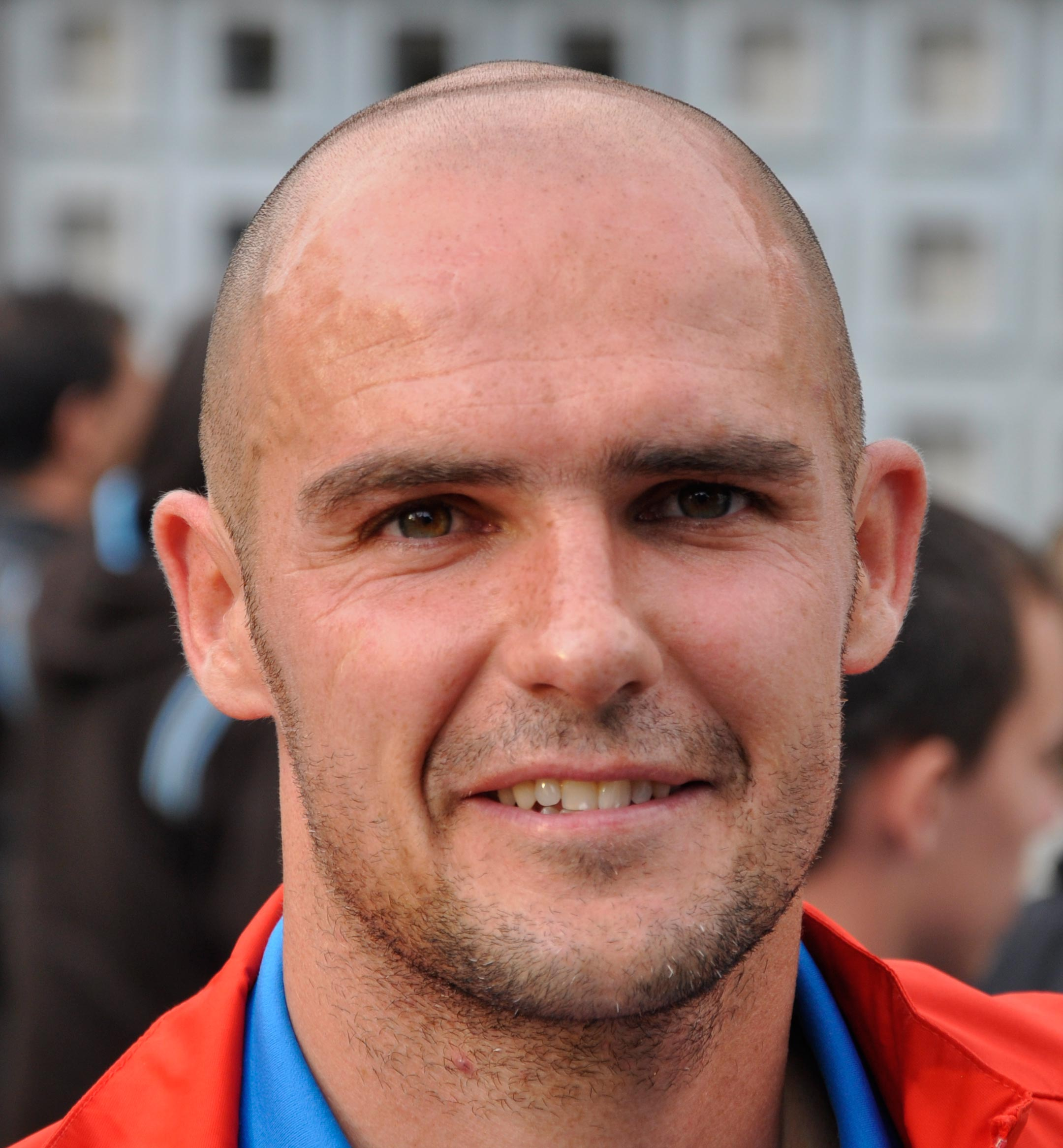
- Nivet in 2010

Personal information
- Date of birth: 2 January 1977 (age 49)
- Place of birth: Chartres, France
- Height: 1.75 m (5 ft 9 in)
- Position: Attacking midfielder

Senior career*
Years	Team	Apps	(Gls)
1997–2000	Auxerre	13	(0)
1999–2000	→ Châteauroux (loan)	30	(5)
2000–2002	Châteauroux	54	(8)
2002–2007	Troyes	165	(32)
2007–2012	Caen	167	(24)
2012–2019	Troyes	226	(41)
Total		655	(110)
- * Club domestic league appearances and goals

Benjamin Nivet (born 2 January 1977) is a French former professional footballer who played as an attacking midfielder.

He began his career in 1997 with Auxerre, and is best known for his association with Troyes, whom he represented over 12 years in two separate spells, from 2002 to 2007 and later from 2012 until his retirement in 2019. Nivet holds the records at Troyes for most appearances and most goals for the club.

== Career ==
Born in Chartres, Nivet started his career as a youth with Auxerre. He made his first league appearances in the 1997–98 season. However, by the end of the following season, he had made only twelve further appearances and was sent on loan to Ligue 2 club Châteauroux for the 1999–2000 season, before making the move permanent for the next season.

After establishing himself as a regular for Châteauroux, he made the step back up to Ligue 1 with Troyes in January 2002. Despite a slow start, Nivet established himself as a regular in the club's 2002–03 relegation season. Wearing the number 10 shirt, he proved an eye for goal, weighing in with 12 goals in Troyes' 2005–06 promotion season. He played at Troyes from 2002 to 2007.

He signed a three-year contract with Stade Malherbe Caen on 8 June 2007, a club newly promoted to Ligue 1.

After five years in Caen, he could not avoid relegation at the end of the 2011–12 season. A free agent, he returned to Troyes, promoted to Ligue 1, signing a one-year contract on 11 June 2012. After four years with Troyes, he could not avoid relegation at the end of the 2015–16 season after a disastrous campaign which saw the club win only three matches and concede some heavy defeats, most notably a resounding 9–0 home loss to PSG, the club's biggest ever victory.

On 8 January 2017, Nivet, who had turned 40 just six days before, played his 650th professional match and scored twice against his former club Auxerre in a 4–2 loss in the round of 64 of the 2016–17 Coupe de France. On 28 May 2017, the 40-year-old Nivet scored a late winner in the second leg of the promotion play-off against Lorient, which turned out to be the decisive goal that saw Troyes promoted to Ligue 1.

In the top division, Nivet was only able to reach a rich vein of form towards the end of the 2017–18 season, when he registered one goal contribution for three matches in a row, including a goal against Olympique de Marseille on 15 April 2018, becoming, at the age of 41 years and 103 days, the oldest player to ever score in Ligue 1, thus breaking the previous record set by Vitorino Hilton on 7 February 2017, at the age of 39. He then extended this record when he scored again just two weeks later, on 28 April, in a 3–1 win over Stade Malherbe Caen.

In the spring of 2019, Nivet announced his retirement from professional football aged 42. Nivet perhaps deserved to play in a more upscale club, but his loyalty to Troyes and his innate modesty prevent that. In fact, he even reportedly declined an offer from the City of Troyes to build a statue in his honour.

== Career statistics ==
Appearances and goals by club, season and competition
Club	Season	League			Cup (Note: Includes Coupe de France, Coupe de la Ligue)		Other (Note: Includes Ligue 1 relegation playoffs)		Total	
Club	Season	Division	Apps	Goals	Apps	Goals	Apps	Goals	Apps	Goals
Auxerre	1997–98	Division 1	7	0	2	0	—		9	0
Auxerre	1998–99	Division 1	6	0	—		—		6	0
Auxerre	Total		13	0	2	0	0	0	15	0
Châteauroux	1999–2000	Division 2	30	5	3	0	—		33	5
Châteauroux	2000–01	Division 2	33	4	6	1	—		39	5
Châteauroux	2001–02	Division 2	21	4	4	0	—		25	0
Châteauroux	Total		84	13	13	1	0	0	97	14
Troyes	2001–02	Ligue 1 (Note: Division 1 until 2002)	6	0	1	0	—		7	0
Troyes	2002–03	Ligue 1	23	2	1	0	—		24	2
Troyes	2003–04	Ligue 2	35	6	4	1	—		39	7
Troyes	2004–05	Ligue 2	32	12	3	1	—		35	13
Troyes	2005–06	Ligue 1	38	6	2	1	—		40	7
Troyes	2006–07	Ligue 1	31	6	2	0	—		33	6
Troyes	Total		165	32	13	3	0	0	178	35
Caen	2007–08	Ligue 1	35	2	1	0	—		36	2
Caen	2008–09	Ligue 1	32	6	2	0	—		34	6
Caen	2009–10	Ligue 2	36	6	4	0	—		40	6
Caen	2010–11	Ligue 1	31	3	3	0	—		34	3
Caen	2011–12	Ligue 1	33	7	3	0	—		36	7
Caen	Total		167	24	13	0	0	0	180	24
Troyes	2012–13	Ligue 1	37	10	3	0	—		40	10
Troyes	2013–14	Ligue 2	36	8	7	3	—		43	11
Troyes	2014–15	Ligue 2	35	11	2	0	—		37	11
Troyes	2015–16	Ligue 1	34	3	2	1	—		36	4
Troyes	2016–17	Ligue 2	36	7	1	2	2	1	39	10
Troyes	2017–18	Ligue 1	26	2	3	2	0	0	29	4
Troyes	2018–19	Ligue 2	22	0	1	0	1	0	24	0
Troyes	Total		226	41	19	8	3	1	248	50
Career total			655	110	60	12	3	1	718	123
