= France national youth football team =

French national football teams

France
- Nickname(s): Les Bleuets (The Little Blues); Les Tricolores (The Tri-colours)
- Association: French Football Federation
- Confederation: UEFA (Europe)
- Head coach: Various
- Captain: Various
- FIFA code: FRA
First colours	Second colours

The France national youth football team are the national under-21, under-20, under-19, under-18, under-17 and under-16 football teams of France and are controlled by the French Football Federation. The youth teams of France participate in tournaments sanctioned by both FIFA and UEFA and also participates in world, regional, and local international tournaments.
