= 2023–24 Angers SCO season =

Angers SCO
2023–24 season
- Chairman: Romain Chabane
- Manager: Alexandre Dujeux
- Stadium: Stade Raymond Kopa
- Ligue 2: 2nd (promoted)
- Coupe de France: Round of 64
- Top goalscorer: League: Loïs Diony (15); All: Loïs Diony (16)
- Highest home attendance: 16,785 v Laval (06 Apr 2024, Ligue 2)
- Lowest home attendance: 4,972 v Bastia (20 Sept 2023, Ligue 2)
- Biggest win: 4-1 v Amiens (Away, 7 Oct 2023, Ligue 2); 4-1 v Troyes (Away, 16 Dec 2023, Ligue 2); 3-0 v Caen (Home, 27 Nov 2023, Ligue 2)
- Biggest defeat: 4-1 v Rodez (Away, 16 Sept 2023, Ligue 2); 3-0 v Saint-Étienne (Home, 17 Feb 2024, Ligue 2)
Home colours	Away colours	Third colours

The 2023–24 season was Angers Sporting Club de l'Ouest's 125th season in existence and first one back in the Ligue 2. They also competed in the Coupe de France.

== Players ==
=== First-team squad ===
As of 4 August 2023

Note: Flags indicate national team as defined under FIFA eligibility rules; some limited exceptions apply. Players may hold more than one non-FIFA nationality.

No.	Pos.	Nation	Player
2	MF	FRA	Batista Mendy
4	DF	BIH	Halid Šabanović
5	DF	FRA	Marius Courcoul
6	MF	ALG	Nabil Bentaleb (vice-captain)
7	FW	SEN	Ibrahima Niane
9	FW	FRA	Loïs Diony
10	MF	ALG	Himad Abdelli
11	FW	FRA	Sidiki Chérif
12	MF	ALG	Zinédine Ould Khaled
14	MF	MAR	Yassin Belkhdim
15	MF	FRA	Pierrick Capelle (captain)
16	GK	FRA	Melvin Zinga
17	FW	FRA	Justin-Noël Kalumba
19	FW	FRA	Noah Fatar

No.	Pos.	Nation	Player
21	DF	FRA	Jordan Lefort
22	DF	BEN	Cédric Hountondji
23	FW	FRA	Adrien Hunou
24	FW	FRA	Jean-Mattéo Bahoya
25	DF	CIV	Abdoulaye Bamba
27	DF	FRA	Lilian Raolisoa
28	FW	ALG	Farid El Melali
29	DF	FRA	Ousmane Camara
30	GK	CIV	Yahia Fofana
45	FW	FRA	Noah Nadje
70	DF	ALG	Yacine Gaya
94	DF	TUN	Yan Valery
—	MF	FRA	Florent Hanin
—	MF	SEN	Joseph Lopy

=== Out on loan ===
Note: Flags indicate national team as defined under FIFA eligibility rules; some limited exceptions apply. Players may hold more than one non-FIFA nationality.

No.	Pos.	Nation	Player
—	FW	CRO	Marin Jakoliš (on loan to Melbourne City)

== Transfers ==
=== In ===
Pos.	Player	Transferred from	Fee	Date	Source
DF	(France) Jordan Lefort	(France) Paris FC	Free	1 July 2023	
FW	(Senegal) Ibrahima Niane	(France) Metz	€500,000	1 July 2023	
DF	(France) Florent Hanin	(France) Paris FC	Free	31 July 2023	
MF	(Algeria) Zinedine Ferhat	(Turkey) Alanyaspor	Free	31 August 2023	
FW	(France) Esteban Lepaul	(France) SAS Épinal	Undisclosed	25 January 2024	

=== Out ===
Pos.	Player	Transferred to	Fee	Date	Source
GK	(France) Théo Borne	(France) Clermont		1 July 2023	
MF	(France) Salim Akkal	(France) Le Puy		1 July 2023	
FW	(France) Jason Mbock	Released		1 July 2023	
DF	(Ivory Coast) Souleyman Doumbia	Released		1 July 2023	
MF	(Mali) Sada Thioub	Released		1 July 2023	
FW	(France) Amine Salama	(France) Reims	€4,000,000	1 July 2023	
DF	(Algeria) Faouzi Ghoulam	Released		1 July 2023	
DF	(Slovenia) Miha Blažič	Released		1 July 2023	
MF	(France) Waniss Taïbi	(France) Rodez	Undisclosed	4 July 2023	
DF	(Morocco) Oussama Falouh	(Morocco) Wydad AC	Free	19 July 2023	
FW	(France) Noah Fatar	(France) Sochaux	Undisclosed	31 August 2023	
MF	(France) Batista Mendy	(Turkey) Trabzonspor	€4,400,000	8 September 2023	
FW	(France) Jean-Mattéo Bahoya	(Germany) Eintracht Frankfurt	€8,500,000	25 January 2024	
DF	(Bosnia and Herzegovina) Halid Šabanović	(France) Valenciennes	Loan	30 January 2024	

== Pre-season and friendlies ==
Win Draw

8 July 2023 Friendly	Guingamp (France)	1–0	(France) Angers
15:00

15 July 2023 Friendly	SO Cholet (France)	5–4	(France) Angers
18:30

19 July 2023 Friendly	Angers (France)	2–1	(France) Le Mans FC
18:00

23 July 2023 Friendly	Nantes (France)	1–0	(France) Angers	Basse-Goulaine
17:00 CEST (UTC+2)	Mohamed 75' (pen.)			Stadium: Stade Henri-Michel

29 July 2023 Friendly	Angers (France)	1–1	(France) Bordeaux
18:00

== Competitions ==
=== Overall record ===
Competition	First match	Last match	Starting round	Final position	Record							
Competition	First match	Last match	Starting round	Final position	Pld	W	D	L	GF	GA	GD	Win %
Ligue 2	5 August 2023	17 May 2024	Matchday 1	2nd	38	20	8	10	56	42	+14	52.63
Coupe de France	18 November 2023	6 January 2024	Seventh round	Round of 64	3	2	0	1	4	2	+2	66.67
Total					41	22	8	11	60	44	+16	53.66

Source: Soccerway

=== Ligue 2 ===
==== League table ====
Pos	Team	Pld	W	D	L	GF	GA	GD	Pts	Promotion or Relegation
1	Auxerre (C, P)	38	21	11	6	72	36	+36	74	Promotion to Ligue 1
2	Angers (P)	38	20	8	10	56	42	+14	68	Promotion to Ligue 1
3	Saint-Étienne (O, P)	38	19	8	11	48	31	+17	65	Qualification for promotion play-offs final
4	Rodez	38	16	12	10	62	51	+11	60	Qualification for promotion play-offs semi-final
5	Paris FC	38	16	11	11	49	42	+7	59	Qualification for promotion play-offs semi-final

Updated to match(es) played on 17 May 2024. Source: Ligue 2
Rules for classification: 1) Points; 2) Goal difference; 3) Number of goals scored; 4) Head-to-head goal difference; 5) Fair play points
(C) Champions; (O) Play-off winners; (P) Promoted

==== Results summary ====
Overall								Home						Away					
Pld	W	D	L	GF	GA	GD	Pts	W	D	L	GF	GA	GD	W	D	L	GF	GA	GD
38	20	8	10	56	42	+14	68	13	4	2	31	15	+16	7	4	8	25	27	−2

Last updated: 10 May 2024.
Source: Ligue 2 BKT

==== Results by round ====
Round	1	2	3	4	5	6	7	8	9	10	11	12	13	14	15	16	17	18	19	20	21	22	23	24	25	26	27	28	29	30	31	32	33	34	35	36	37	38
Ground	A	H	H	A	H	A	H	A	H	A	H	A	H	A	H	A	H	A	H	A	H	A	H	A	H	A	H	A	H	A	H	A	H	A	A	H	A	H
Result	L	D	D	W	W	L	W	W	W	W	W	L	W	D	W	D	W	W	W	L	W	L	W	L	L	L	W	D	L	W	D	D	W	W	L	W	W	D
Position	16	15	16	12	7	12	7	5	4	3	2	3	2	2	2	2	1	1	1	2	1	2	1	2	2	2	2	2	2	2	3	2	2	2	3	3	2	2

Updated to match(es) played on 10 May 2024. Source: Ligue 2 BKT
A = Away; H = Home; W = Win; D = Draw; L = Loss

==== Matches ====
The league fixtures were unveiled on 29 June 2023.

5 August 2023 1	Laval	1–0	Angers	Laval
19:00	Tapoko (yellow card) 45+2'; Sanna 66'	Report	Lefort (yellow card) 36'; Abdelli (yellow card) 36'; Hountondji (yellow card) 62'	Stadium: Stade François Coty; Attendance: 8,912; Referee: Hakim Ben El Hadj

12 August 2023 2	Angers	0–0	Annecy	Angers
19:00	Mendy (yellow card) 55'; Bahoya (yellow card) 77'	Report	Mahop (yellow card) 46'; Kashi (yellow card) 68'	Stadium: Stade Raymond Kopa; Attendance: 5,083; Referee: Karim Abed

19 August 2023 3	Angers	2–2	Auxerre	Angers
19:00	Abdelli (yellow card) 5'; Diony 45+1'; Nadje 62'; Mendy (yellow card) 79'; Capelle (yellow card) 86'	Report	Perrin 17'; Joly (red card) 20'; Hein 75'	Stadium: Stade Raymond Kopa; Attendance: 5,906; Referee: Abdelatif Kherradji

26 August 2023 4	Dunkerque	0–1	Angers	Dunkirk
	Ghrieb (yellow card) 31'; Orelien (yellow card) 40'; Thiam (yellow card) 90+4'	Report	Bahoya (yellow card) 65'; Niane (yellow card) 77'; Abdelli 90+5'	Stadium: Stade Marcel-Tribut; Attendance: 4,200; Referee: Ahmed Taleb

2 September 2023 5	Angers	2–0	Paris FC	Angers
	Diony 33'; Abdelli (yellow card) 62'; Bahoya 90+4'	Report	Camara (yellow card) 35'; Diaby-Fadinga (yellow card) 45'	Stadium: Stade Raymond Kopa; Attendance: 5,276; Referee: Faouzi Benchabane

16 September 2023 6	Rodez	4–1	Angers	Rodez
	Haag (yellow card) 45+5'; Corredor 46'; Taïbi 49'; Ngouyamsa (yellow card) 83'; Hountondji 86'; Rajot 88'	Report	Diony 2'; Bahoya (yellow card) 52'; Fofana (yellow card) 81'	Stadium: Stade Paul-Lignon; Attendance: 2,722; Referee: Bastien Dechepy

23 September 2023 7	Angers	2–0	Bastia	Angers
19:00	Capelle 29', (yellow card) 73'; Bahoya 90+7'	Report	Yapi (yellow card) 41' (yellow-red card) 90+4'; Keita (yellow card) 63'	Stadium: Stade Raymond Kopa; Attendance: 4,972; Referee: Mikael Lesage

26 September 2023 8	Quevilly-Rouen	0–1	Angers	Le Petit-Quevilly
	Cissé (yellow card) 61' (yellow-red card) 79'; Coulibaly (yellow card) 90+5'	Report	Lefort (yellow card) 35'; Diony 38'; Valery (yellow card) 47'; Lopy (yellow card) 67'; Capelle (yellow card) 70'	Stadium: Stade Robert Diochon; Attendance: 5,194; Referee: Ahmed Taleb

30 September 2023 9	Angers	2–0	Concarneau	Angers
	Niane (yellow card) 28'; Diony 77'; El Melali 90+6'	Report	Mouazan (yellow card) 42'; Ba (yellow card) 90+8'	Stadium: Stade Raymond Kopa; Attendance: 5,487; Referee: Benjamin Lepaysant

7 October 2023 10	Amiens	1–4	Angers	Amiens
	Kaïboué (yellow card) 11'; Carroll 14'; Do Couto (yellow card) 39'; Urhoghide (yellow card) 45+3'; M. Fofana (yellow card) 45+8'; Leautey (red card) 70'	Report	Y. Fofana (yellow card) 20'; El Melali 22'; Abdelli 45+5' (pen.); Ferhat 71' (pen.); Bahoya (yellow card) 77'; Valery (yellow card) 80' (yellow-red card) 87'; Hunou 90+7'	Stadium: Stade de la Licorne; Attendance: 6,799; Referee: Olivier Thual

21 October 2023 11	Angers	2–0	Bordeaux	Angers
	Lopy 33'; Bahoya 60'	Report		Stadium: Stade Raymond Kopa; Attendance: 10,416; Referee: Antoine Valnet

30 October 2023 12	Saint-Étienne	2–0	Angers	Saint-Étienne
20:45	Sissoko 51'; Pétrot 59'; Bouchouari (yellow card) 61'; Lobry (yellow card) 82'	Report	Bamba (yellow card) 84'	Stadium: Stade Geoffroy-Guichard; Attendance: 27,153

4 November 2023 13	Angers	2–0	Valenciennes	Angers
20:45	El Melali 14', (yellow card) 45+5'; Buatu 29' (o.g.); Lefort (yellow card) 33'; Valery (yellow card) 43'; Ferhat (yellow card) 45+5'; Capelle (yellow card) 90+2'	Report	Louchet (yellow card) 16'; Poha (yellow card) 45+5'; Bonnet (yellow card) 90+2'	Stadium: Stade Raymond Kopa; Attendance: 8,094; Referee: Thierry Bouille

11 November 2023 14	Pau	4–4	Angers	Pau
19:00	Bassouamina 2'; Koudou (yellow card) 13'; Boutaïb 30', 90+5'; Ruiz (yellow card) 52'; Sylla 62'; Beusnard (yellow card) 69'	Report	Diony 20'; Lopy 47'; Abdelli 58' (pen.); Bahoya 88'	Stadium: Nouste Camp; Attendance: 3,162; Referee: Mickaël Leleu

27 November 2023 15	Angers	3–0	Caen	Angers
20:45	Diony 29'; Hountondji (yellow card) 72'; Capelle 87'; Bahoya 90+4'	Report	Abdi (yellow card) 8'; Mbock (yellow card) 47'; Ben Youssef (yellow card) 74' (yellow-red card) 75'; Henry (yellow card) 78'	Stadium: Stade Raymond Kopa; Attendance: 9,202; Referee: Ahmed Taleb

2 December 2023 16	Ajaccio	1–1	Angers	Ajaccio
19:00	Jacob 28'; Campanini (yellow card) 36'; Chanot (yellow card) 64'; Marchetti (yellow card) 76'	Report	El Melali 42'; Hountondji (yellow card) 66'	Stadium: Stade Michel Moretti; Attendance: 3,956; Referee: Rémi Landry

5 December 2023 17	Angers	1–0	Grenoble	Angers
20:45	Diony 34'	Report		Stadium: Stade Raymond Kopa; Attendance: 9,006; Referee: Nicolas Rainville

16 December 2023 18	Troyes	1–4	Angers	Troyes
	Hanin 8' (o.g.); Titi (yellow card) 41'	Report	Capelle 31'; Ferhat 33'; Diony 34'; Abdelli 55'; Valery (yellow card) 73'	Stadium: Stade de l'Aube; Attendance: 5,039; Referee: Mikael Lesage

19 December 2023 19	Angers	1–0	Guingamp	Angers
20:45	Diony 24', (yellow card) 79'	Report	Sidibé (yellow card) 51'; Louiserre (yellow card) 53'	Stadium: Stade Raymond Kopa; Attendance: 10,205; Referee: Faouzi Benchabane

13 January 2024 20	Bastia	2–0	Angers	Furiani
	Janneh (yellow card) 23'; Bianchini 29'; Alfarela 60'	Report		Stadium: Stade Armand-Cesari; Attendance: 10,328; Referee: Benjamin LePaysant

23 January 2024 21	Angers	3–2	Quevilly-Rouen	Angers
20:45	Abdelli 25' (pen.); El Melali 41', 90+3', (yellow card) 90+5'	Report	Cadiou 19'; Camara 67'; Cissokho (yellow card) 76'	Stadium: Stade Raymond Kopa; Attendance: 7,803; Referee: Aurélien Petit

29 January 2024 22	Bordeaux	1–0	Angers	Bordeaux
	Ihnatenko (yellow card) 10'; Nsimba (yellow card) 27'; Davitashvili 70'; Marcelin (red card) 71'; Elis (yellow card) 90+5'	Report	Ould Khaled (yellow card) 44'; El Melali (yellow card) 83'; Abdelli (yellow card) 90+5'	Stadium: Matmut Atlantique; Attendance: 17,148; Referee: Ruddy Buquet

3 February 2024 23	Angers	2–1	Rodez	Angers
	Lopy 45+2', (yellow card) 90+3'; El Melali 52'; Ferhat (yellow card) 90'	Report	Corredor 4'; Abdallah (yellow card) 45+4'; Depres (yellow card) 63'; Danger (yellow card) 81'	Stadium: Stade Raymond Kopa; Attendance: 8,473; Referee: Karim Abed

10 February 2024 24	Auxerre	1–0	Angers	Auxerre
	Owusu (yellow card) 33' (yellow-red card) 36'; Jubal 90+1' (pen.)	Report	Lepaul (yellow card) 27'; Raolisoa (yellow card) 90+2'	Stadium: Stade de l'Abbé-Deschamps; Attendance: 16,732; Referee: Mathieu Vernice

17 February 2024 25	Angers	0–3	Saint-Étienne	Angers
	Raolisoa (yellow card) 71'; Niane (yellow card) 83'; Abdelli (yellow card) 90+1'	Report	Cardona 42', 44'; Lefort 64' (o.g.); Monconduit (yellow card) 76'	Stadium: Stade Raymond Kopa; Attendance: 15,662; Referee: Nicolas Rainville

26 February 2024 26	Caen	2–0	Angers	Caen
	Abdi 13', 58'; Mandrea (yellow card) 83'	Report	Abdelli (yellow card) 79'	Stadium: Stade Michel d'Ornano; Attendance: 16,965; Referee: Aurélien Petit

4 March 2024 27	Angers	3–1	Ajaccio	Angers
	Abdelli 28' (pen.); El Melali (yellow card) 59'; Lepaul 87'; Diony 90+4'	Report	Ibayi 38'; Soumano (yellow card) 64'; Sakhi (yellow card) 81'	Stadium: Stade Raymond Kopa; Attendance: 9,636; Referee: Mikael Lesage

9 March 2024 28	Valenciennes	0–0	Angers	Valenciennes
	Oyewusi (yellow card) 53'; Doucouré (yellow card) 61'	Report	Bamba (yellow card) 50'	Stadium: Stade du Hainaut; Attendance: 5,633; Referee: Antoine Valnet

16 March 2024 29	Angers	1–3	Amiens	Angers
	Ould Khaled 34'	Report	Chouiar 59'; Carroll 68'; Corchia (yellow card) 90+1'; Jaouab (yellow card) 90+5'; Mafouta 90+6'	Stadium: Stade Raymond Kopa; Attendance: 9,685; Referee: Azzédine Souifi

30 March 2024 30	Concarneau	2–4	Angers	Concarneau
	Mouazan 9'; Rodrigues 41'; Georgen (yellow card) 47'	Report	Raolisoa (yellow card) 45+2'; Diony 50', 90'; El Melali 59'; Lepaul 78'	Stadium: Stade Guy-Piriou; Attendance: 1,442; Referee: Pierre Legat

6 April 2024 31	Angers	1–1	Laval	Angers
	Hountondji (yellow card) 12'; Abdelli 87' (pen.); Lefort (yellow card) 90+3'	Report	Pagis 4'; Diaw (yellow card) 22'; Roye (yellow card) 26'; Baldé (red card) 85'	Stadium: Stade Raymond Kopa; Attendance: 16,785; Referee: Aurélien Petit

15 April 2024 32	Grenoble	0–0	Angers	Grenoble
	Paquiez (yellow card) 63'; Touray (yellow card) 86'	Report	Ould Khaled (yellow card) 14'; Bamba (yellow card) 45'	Stadium: Stade des Alpes; Attendance: 5,132; Referee: Ahmed Taleb

20 April 2024 33	Angers	2–1	Troyes	Angers
	Bamba (yellow card) 45'; Lepaul 60'; Abdelli 68'	Report	Ntim (yellow card) 9'; Chavalerin (yellow card) 11'; Diop 29'	Stadium: Stade Raymond Kopa; Attendance: 9,468; Referee: Abdelatif Kherradji

23 April 2024 34	Guingamp	1–2	Angers	Guingamp
	Guillaume 45+1'; Siwe (yellow card) 89'; Louiserre (yellow card) 90+4'	Report	Raolisoa 37'; Bamba (yellow card) 45+2'; Diony 83'	Stadium: Stade de Roudourou; Attendance: 9,259; Referee: Olivier Thual

27 April 2024 35	Paris FC	3–1	Angers	Paris
18:00	Jabbari 18', (yellow card) 19'; Kebbal (yellow card) 70', (goal) 83'; Valery 79' (o.g.)	Report	Capelle 41'	Stadium: Stade Sébastien Charléty; Attendance: 10,252; Referee: Ruddy Buquet

3 May 2024 36	Angers	2–1	Pau	Angers
19:00	Abdelli 12'; Hanin 52'; Kalumba (yellow card) 78'; Zinga (yellow card) 90+5'	Report	Ruiz 56', (yellow card) 63'; Obiang (yellow card) 60'; Gaspar (yellow card) 82'	Stadium: Stade Raymond Kopa; Attendance: 10,728; Referee: Eric Wattellier

10 May 2024 37	Annecy	1–2	Angers	Annecy
20:45	Demoncy 20'; Gonçalves (yellow card) 84'	Report	Capelle 42'; Hanin (yellow card) 83'; Abdelli (yellow card) 89'; Diony 90'	Stadium: Parc des Sports; Attendance: 13,063; Referee: Romain Lissorgue

17 May 2024 38	Angers	0–0	Dunkerque	Angers
20:45		Report	Koné (yellow card) 72'	Stadium: Stade Raymond Kopa; Attendance: 16,594; Referee: Florent Batta

=== Coupe de France ===
18 November 2023 7th Round	AC Houilles	0–2	Angers	Houilles, Paris
14:00 CET (UTC+1)	Lacen (yellow card) 36'	Report	Diony 38'; Abdelli 90+3' (pen.)	Stadium: Stade Maurice-Baquet; Referee: William Toulliou

9 December 2023 8th Round	FC Plessis-Robinson	1–2	Angers	Le Plessis-Robinson, Paris
15:00 CET (UTC+1)	Petiteaux 4'; Barbette (yellow card) 44'; Diabaté (yellow card) 87'	Report	Niane 25'; Ould Khaled (yellow card) 45+2'; Šabanović (yellow card) 59'; Hunou 79'	Stadium: Parc des Sports du Hameau; Referee: Valentin Giorgetti

6 January 2024 Round of 64	Brest	1–0	Angers	Brest
15:30 CET (UTC+1)	Raolisoa 63' (o.g.); Camblan (red card) 90+3'	Report	Lopy (yellow card) 23'; Ferhat (yellow card) 78'	Stadium: Stade Francis-Le Blé; Attendance: 10,673; Referee: Stéphanie Frappart
