= 2024–25 Angers SCO season =

Angers
2024–25 season
- Manager: Alexandre Dujeux
- Stadium: Stade Raymond Kopa
- Ligue 1: 14th
- Coupe de France: Quarter-finals
- Top goalscorer: League: Esteban Lepaul (9); All: Esteban Lepaul (13)
- Average home league attendance: 13,137
- Biggest win: Angers 4–2 Saint-Étienne
- Biggest defeat: Angers 1–4 Nice
Home colours	Away colours
- All statistics correct as of 25 May 2025.

The 2024–25 season was the 106th season in the history of Angers SCO. In addition to the domestic league, the team participated in the Coupe de France.

== Players ==
=== First-team squad ===
As of 30 August 2024

Note: Flags indicate national team as defined under FIFA eligibility rules; some limited exceptions apply. Players may hold more than one non-FIFA nationality.

No.	Pos.	Nation	Player
2	DF	HAI	Carlens Arcus
3	DF	GAB	Jacques Ekomié
5	DF	FRA	Marius Courcoul
6	MF	CIV	Jean-Eudes Aholou
7	FW	SEN	Ibrahima Niane
8	MF	SEN	Joseph Lopy
9	FW	FRA	Loïs Diony
10	MF	ALG	Himad Abdelli (vice-captain)
11	FW	FRA	Sidiki Cherif
12	MF	FRA	Zinédine Ould Khaled
14	MF	MAR	Yassin Belkhdim
15	MF	FRA	Pierrick Capelle (captain)
16	GK	CGO	Melvin Zinga
17	FW	FRA	Justin Kalumba

No.	Pos.	Nation	Player
18	MF	GAB	Jim Allevinah
19	FW	FRA	Esteban Lepaul
20	FW	ALG	Zinedine Ferhat
21	DF	FRA	Jordan Lefort
22	DF	BEN	Cédric Hountondji
24	DF	FRA	Emmanuel Biumla
25	DF	CIV	Abdoulaye Bamba
26	DF	FRA	Florent Hanin
27	DF	FRA	Lilian Raolisoa
28	FW	ALG	Farid El Melali
30	GK	CIV	Yahia Fofana
93	MF	ALG	Haris Belkebla
99	FW	SEN	Bamba Dieng (on loan from Lorient)

=== Other players under contract ===
Note: Flags indicate national team as defined under FIFA eligibility rules; some limited exceptions apply. Players may hold more than one non-FIFA nationality.

No.	Pos.	Nation	Player
23	FW	FRA	Adrien Hunou
29	DF	FRA	Ousmane Camara

No.	Pos.	Nation	Player
—	DF	BIH	Halid Šabanović

== Transfers ==
=== In ===
No.	Pos.	Player	Transferred from	Fee	Date	Source
2	DF	(Haiti) Carlens Arcus	(Netherlands) Vitesse	Free	1 July 2024	
6	MF	(Ivory Coast) Jean-Eudes Aholou	(France) Strasbourg	Free	1 July 2024	
18	FW	(Gabon) Jim Allevinah	(France) Clermont	Free	1 July 2024	
24	MF	(France) Emmanuel Biumla	Unattached	Free	31 July 2024	
3	DF	(Gabon) Jacques Ekomié	Unattached	Free	31 July 2024	
93	MF	(Algeria) Haris Belkebla	(Saudi Arabia) Ohod	Free	18 August 2024	
—	FW	(Senegal) Bamba Dieng	(France) Lorient	Loan	30 August 2024	

=== Out ===
Pos.	Player	Transferred to	Fee	Date	Source
DF	(Tunisia) Yan Valery	(England) Sheffield Wednesday	Undisclosed	21 June 2024	
FW	(Croatia) Marin Jakoliš	(Australia) Macarthur FC	Free	1 July 2024	

== Friendlies ==
=== Pre-season ===
17 July 2024 Friendly	Châteaubriant (France)	2–3	(France) Angers	Châteaubriant
17:00	Leye 8'; 90'		Niane 14'; Lepaul 31'; Loïs Diony 88'	Stadium: Stade de la Ville en Bois

20 July 2024 Friendly	Le Mans (France)	2–0	(France) Angers	Sablé-sur-Sarthe
17:00	Tronchet 45+4'; Gueye 90+2'			Stadium: Stade Rémy Lambert

27 July 2024 Friendly	Rennes (France)	2-1	(France) Angers	France
18:00

3 August 2024 Friendly	Angers (France)	1–2	(France) Lorient	Châteaubriant
16:30				Stadium: Stade de la Ville en Bois

10 August 2024 Friendly	Angers (France)	1–2	(France) Bastia

== Competitions ==
=== Overall record ===
Competition	First match	Last match	Starting round	Final position	Record							
Competition	First match	Last match	Starting round	Final position	Pld	W	D	L	GF	GA	GD	Win %
Ligue 1	18 August 2024	May 2025	Matchday 1		32	9	6	17	30	50	−20	28.13
Coupe de France	22 December 2024	5 February 2025	Round of 64	Quarter-finals	4	3	1	0	8	4	+4	75.00
Total					36	12	7	17	38	54	−16	33.33

Last updated: 9 May 2025
Source: Soccerway

=== Ligue 1 ===
==== League table ====
Pos	Team	Pld	W	D	L	GF	GA	GD	Pts	Qualification or relegation
12	Rennes	34	13	2	19	51	50	+1	41	
13	Nantes	34	8	12	14	39	52	−13	36	
14	Angers	34	10	6	18	32	53	−21	36	
15	Le Havre	34	10	4	20	40	71	−31	34	
16	Reims (R)	34	8	9	17	33	47	−14	33	Qualification for the relegation play-offs

Source: Ligue 1
Rules for classification: 1) Points; 2) Goal difference; 3) Head-to-head points; 4) Head-to-head goal difference; 5) Head-to-head goals scored; 6) Head-to-head away goals scored; 7) Goals scored; 8) Away goals scored; 9) Fair-play points (Note: Head-to-head record is used only after all the matches between the teams in question have been played).
(R) Relegated

==== Results summary ====
Overall								Home						Away					
Pld	W	D	L	GF	GA	GD	Pts	W	D	L	GF	GA	GD	W	D	L	GF	GA	GD
32	9	6	17	30	50	−20	33	4	2	10	16	32	−16	5	4	7	14	18	−4

Last updated: 9 May 2025.
Source: Ligue 1

==== Results by round ====
Round	1	2	3	4	5	6	7	8	9	10	11	12	13	14	15	16	17	18	19	20	21	22	23	24	25	26	27	28	29	30	31	32	33
Ground	H	A	H	A	H	H	A	A	H	A	H	A	A	H	A	H	A	H	A	H	H	A	A	H	A	H	H	A	H	A	H	A	H
Result	L	L	L	D	D	L	D	D	W	W	L	L	W	L	L	W	W	W	L	D	L	W	D	L	L	L	L	L	W	L	L	W	
Position	13	15	17	17	18	18	18	17	15	15	15	17	14	15	15	14	13	12	13	12	13	11	12	13	13	14	14	14	14	15	15	14	

Updated to match(es) played on 9 May 2025. Source: Ligue 1
A = Away; H = Home; W = Win; D = Draw; L = Loss

==== Matches ====
The league schedule was released on 21 June 2024.

18 August 2024 1	Angers	0–1	Lens	Angers
17:00	Lefort (yellow card) 58'	Report	Saïd 28'	Stadium: Stade Raymond Kopa; Attendance: 14,811; Referee: Thomas Léonard

24 August 2024 2	Lille	2–0	Angers	Lille
19:00	Meunier 34'; E. Mbappé (yellow card) 45+1'; Bayo 90+5'	Report	Ould Khaled (yellow card) 43'; El Melali (yellow card) 63'	Stadium: Stade Pierre-Mauroy; Attendance: 36,906; Referee: Abdelatif Kherradji

1 September 2024 3	Angers	1–4	Nice	Angers
17:00	Bamba (yellow card) 11'; Fofana (yellow card) 33'; Aholou (yellow card) 41'; Belkhdim (yellow card) 45'; Abdelli 67'; Capelle (yellow card) 81'; Dieng (yellow card) 81'	Report	Ndayishimiye 6'; Bouanani (yellow card) 16'; Boudaoui 25', (yellow card) 65'; Guessand 72', 85'; Bombito (yellow card) 30' (yellow-red card)	Stadium: Stade Raymond Kopa; Attendance: 9,168; Referee: Jérémy Stinat

15 September 2024 4	Strasbourg	1–1	Angers	Strasbourg
17:00	Sylla (yellow card) 4'; Nanasi 31'; Doué (yellow card) 40'; Diarra (yellow card) 67'; Emegha (yellow card) 90+3'	Report	Dieng 62'; Hanin (yellow card) 65'	Stadium: Stade de la Meinau; Attendance: 19,135; Referee: Hakim Ben El Hadj

22 September 2024 5	Angers	1–1	Nantes	Angers
17:00 CEST (UTC+2)	Abdelli 24' (pen.); Allevinah (yellow card) 45+1'	Report	Lepenant 18'; Augusto (yellow card) 32'; Duverne (yellow card) 54'; Mohamed (yellow card) 67'; Pallois (yellow card) 87'	Stadium: Stade Raymond Kopa; Attendance: 16,960; Referee: Mathieu Vernice

29 September 2024 6	Angers	1–3	Reims	Angers
17:00 CEST (UTC+2)	Ferhat 84'	Report	Nakamura 9', (yellow card) 43'; J. Ito 25'; A. Buta (yellow card) 44'; Diakité (yellow card) 48'; Munetsi 79'	Stadium: Stade Raymond Kopa; Attendance: 8,526; Referee: Eric Wattellier

4 October 2024 7	Marseille	1–1	Angers	Marseille
	Maupay (yellow card) 27' (yellow-red card) 30'; Balerdi (yellow card) 31'; Carboni (yellow card) 45+5'; Rowe 51'	Report	Raolisoa (red card) 26'; El Melali 54'	Stadium: Stade Vélodrome; Attendance: 54,568; Referee: Romain Lissorgue

20 October 2024 8	Toulouse	1–1	Angers	Toulouse
22.00	Aboukhlal (yellow card) 7'; Zajc (yellow card) 61'; King 64'	Report	Niane 5'; Arcus (yellow card) 25'; Aholou (yellow card) 38'; Fofana (yellow card) 74'; Abdelli (yellow card) 90'	Stadium: Stadium de Toulouse; Attendance: 24,107; Referee: Willy Delajod

26 October 2024 9	Angers	4–2	Saint-Étienne	Angers
17:00	Abdelli 7'; Belkhdim (yellow card) 34'; Aholou 39'; Niane 69' (pen.); Dieng 90+3'	Report	Davitashvili 16' (pen.), 57'; Abdelhamid (yellow card) 29'; Boakye (yellow card) 38'; Cafaro (yellow card) 71'	Stadium: Stade Raymond Kopa; Attendance: 13,796; Referee: Marc Bollengier

1 November 2024 10	Monaco	0–1	Angers	Monaco
19:00	Camara (yellow card) 17'; Capelle (yellow card) 89'	Report	Aholou 29'	Stadium: Stade Louis II; Attendance: 10,540; Referee: Abdelatif Kherradji

9 November 2024 11	Angers	2–4	Paris Saint-Germain	Angers
21:00 CET (UTC+1)	Lepaul 90+1'; Biumla 90+7'	Report	Lee 17', 20'; Beraldo (yellow card) 24'; Barcola 31', 45+2'; Zaïre-Emery (yellow card) 59'; Marquinhos (yellow card) 82'	Stadium: Stade Raymond Kopa; Attendance: 17,212; Referee: Benoît Millot

24 November 2024 12	Auxerre	1–0	Angers	Auxerre
17:00 CET (UTC+1)	Owusu (yellow card) 26'; Mensah (yellow card) 50'; Raveloson (yellow card) 84'; Traorè 90+3' (pen.), (yellow card) 90+4'	Report	Arcus (yellow card) 33'	Stadium: Stade de l'Abbé-Deschamps; Attendance: 16,120; Referee: François Letexier

1 December 2024 13	Le Havre	0–1	Angers	Le Havre
17:00 CET (UTC+1)	Kechta (yellow card) 86'; Kinkoue (yellow card) 90+1'	Report	Abdelli 63'	Stadium: Stade Océane; Attendance: 20,018; Referee: Willy Delajod

7 December 2024 14	Angers	0–3	Lyon	Angers
21:00 CET (UTC+1)	Dieng (yellow card) 13'	Report	Lacazette (yellow card) 13'; Tagliafico 26'; Cherki 55'; Mikautadze 88'; Ćaleta-Car (yellow card) 90+4'	Stadium: Stade Raymond Kopa; Attendance: 16,301; Referee: Marc Bollengier

15 December 2024 15	Rennes	2–0	Angers	Rennes
17:00 CET (UTC+1)	Grønbæk 33'; James (yellow card) 39'; Østigård (yellow card) 56'; Kalimuendo (yellow card) 80'; Assignon 90+2'	Report	Ferhat (yellow card) 78'	Stadium: Roazhon Park; Attendance: 27,781; Referee: Hakim Ben El Hadj

5 January 2025 16	Angers	2–0	Brest	Angers
15:00 CET (UTC+1)	Lepaul 6'; Allevinah (yellow card) 9'; Aholou (yellow card) 45+1'; Niane 90+5'	Report	Haïdara (yellow card) 31'	Stadium: Stade Raymond Kopa; Attendance: 12,691; Referee: Benoît Millot

12 January 2025 17	Montpellier	1–3	Angers	Montpellier
17:15 CET (UTC+1)	Nzingoula (yellow card) 39'; Al-Taamari (yellow card) 45+1'; Sylla (yellow card) 53'; Savanier 61' (pen.); Kouyaté (yellow card) 73' (yellow-red card) 84'; Fayad (yellow card) 83'; Ferri (red card) 85'	Report	Lepaul 30', 69'; Aholou (yellow card) 47'; Belkebla (yellow card) 90+4'; Ferhat 90+9'	Stadium: Stade de la Mosson; Attendance: 11,719; Referee: Romain Lissorgue

19 January 2025 18	Angers	2–0	Auxerre	Angers
16:15 CET (UTC+1)	Biumla (yellow card) 14'; Diomandé 18' (o.g.); Lepaul 47'; Allevinah (yellow card) 60'	Report	Osho (red card) 22'; N'Gatta (yellow card) 90'	Stadium: Stade Raymond Kopa; Attendance: 9,938; Referee: Stéphanie Frappart

26 January 2025 19	Lens	1–0	Angers	Lens
16:15 CET (UTC+1)	Frankowski 49'; Medina (yellow card) 80'	Report	Fofana (yellow card) 48'	Stadium: Stade Bollaert-Delelis; Attendance: 37,321; Referee: Abdelatif Kherradji

2 February 2025 20	Angers	1–1	Le Havre	Angers
17:15 CET (UTC+1)	Raolisoa (red card) 10'; Abdelli (yellow card) 25'; Bamba (yellow card) 51'; Hanin 90'	Report	Négo (yellow card) 2'; Sangante (red card) 16'; Casimir (yellow card) 25'; Ayew 73'; Kechta (yellow card) 76'; Lloris (yellow card) 80'	Stadium: Stade Raymond Kopa; Attendance: 11,267; Referee: Jérémie Pignard

9 February 2025 21	Angers	0–2	Marseille	Angers
20:45 CET (UTC+1)	Aholou (yellow card) 48'	Report	Balerdi (yellow card) 16'; Rabiot (yellow card) 48', (goal) 69'; Maupay 74'	Stadium: Stade Raymond Kopa; Attendance: 17,325; Referee: Hakim Ben El Hadj

16 February 2025 22	Reims	0–1	Angers	Reims
17:15 CET (UTC+1)	Gbane (yellow card) 32'; Buta (yellow card) 41'	Report	El Melali 45+1'; Aholou (yellow card) 63'	Stadium: Stade Auguste-Delaune; Attendance: 11,868; Referee: Florent Batta

22 February 2025 23	Saint-Étienne	3–3	Angers	Saint-Étienne
19:00 CET (UTC+1)	Batubinsika (yellow card) 5'; Maçon (yellow card) 26'; Cardona 36', 73'; Ekwah 52'; Bernauer (yellow card) 90+1'	Report	Abdelli 7' (pen.), 17'; Dieng 90+4' (pen.)	Stadium: Stade Geoffroy-Guichard; Attendance: 30,566; Referee: Bastien Dechepy

2 March 2025 24	Angers	0–4	Toulouse	Angers
17:15 CET (UTC+1)	Aholou (yellow card) 45+2'; Fofane (yellow card) 58'; Capelle (yellow card) 90+6'	Report	Magri 51' (yellow card) 45'; Sierro 57'; Creswell 71'; Dønnum 63'; Kamanzi (yellow card) 84'; Edjouma 90+4'; Gboho (yellow card) 90+6'	Stadium: Stade Raymond Kopa; Attendance: 12,758; Referee: Jérémy Stinat

9 March 2025 25	Brest	2–0	Angers	Brest
15:00 CET (UTC+1)	Sima 19'; Magnetti (yellow card) 37'; Faivre 60'	Report	Biumla (yellow card) 82'	Stadium: Stade Francis-Le Blé; Attendance: 14,612; Referee: Abdelatif Kherradji

15 March 2025 26	Angers	0–2	Monaco	Angers
19:00 CET (UTC+1)	Abdelli (yellow card) 52'	Report	Caio Henrique (yellow card) 43'; Minamino (yellow card) 68'; Biereth 77'; Akliouche 88' (pen.)	Stadium: Stade Raymond Kopa; Attendance: 11,116; Referee: Willy Delajod

30 March 2025 27	Angers	0–3	Rennes	Angers
17:15 CEST (UTC+2)	Capelle (yellow card) 45+6'	Report	Kalimuendo 13', 90+5'; Koné 70'	Stadium: Stade Raymond Kopa; Attendance: 11,700; Referee: Thomas Léonard

5 April 2025 28	Paris Saint-Germain	1–0	Angers	Paris
17:00 CEST (UTC+2)	Doué 55'	Report	Hanin (yellow card) 14'; Ekomié (yellow card) 21'; Lepaul (yellow card) 42'	Stadium: Parc des Princes; Attendance: 47,736; Referee: Marc Bollengier

13 April 2025 29	Angers	2–0	Montpellier	Angers
17:15	Lepaul 2', 43'	Report	Fayad (yellow card) 37'; Sagnan (yellow card) 45'	Stadium: Stade Raymond Kopa; Attendance: 12,514; Referee: Benoît Millot

20 April 2025 30	Nice	2–1	Angers	Nice
17:15 CET (UTC+1)	Rosario 36'; Abdi 47'; Clauss (yellow card) 56'	Report	Belkhdim 52'; Abdelli (yellow card) 80'	Stadium: Allianz Riviera; Attendance: 25,088; Referee: Jérémy Stinat

27 April 2025 31	Angers	0–2	Lille	Angers
15:00 CEST (UTC+2)	Belkhdim (yellow card) 61'	Report	Diakité (yellow card) 18' (yellow-red card) 67'; Alexsandro 45+1'; Haraldsson 50'; Fernandez-Pardo (yellow card) 57'; Meunier (yellow card) 58'; André (yellow card) 83'	Stadium: Stade Raymond Kopa; Attendance: 12,782; Referee: Hakim Ben El Hadj

4 May 2025 32	Nantes	0–1	Angers	Nantes
15:00 CEST (UTC+2)	Abline (yellow card) 12'; Zézé (yellow card) 69'	Report	Arcus (yellow card) 19'; Lepaul (yellow card) 40'; Allevinah 52'; Belkhdim (yellow card) 65'	Stadium: Stade de la Beaujoire; Attendance: 34,556; Referee: Thomas Léonard

10 May 2025 33	Angers	v	Strasbourg	Angers
21:00		Report		Stadium: Stade Raymond Kopa

=== Coupe de France ===
22 December 2024 Round of 64	93 Bobigny-Bagnolet-Gagny	0–1	Angers	Bobigny, Paris
17:30 CET (UTC+1)	Toure (yellow card) 90'	Report	Ferhat (yellow card) 43'; Belkhdim (yellow card) 56'; Lepaul 66'; Ekomié (yellow card) 82'	Stadium: Stade Auguste-Delaune; Attendance: 1,506; Referee: Mathieu Vernice

15 January 2025 Round of 32	Quevilly-Rouen	2–3	Angers	Le Petit-Quevilly
18:30 CET (UTC+1)	Dali-Amar 28', 90'; Leborgne (yellow card) 90'	Report	Lepaul 2'; Dieng 6' (pen.); Allevinah 52'	Stadium: Stade Robert Diochon; Attendance: 3,771; Referee: Hakim Ben El Hadj

5 February 2025 Round of 16	Strasbourg	1–3	Angers	Strasbourg
20:45	Lemaréchal 13'	Report	Lepaul 2', 15'; El Melali 76'	Stadium: Stade de la Meinau; Attendance: 15,043; Referee: Eric Wattellier

25 February 2025 Quarter-finals	Angers	1–1 (3–5 p)	Reims	Angers
21:00 CET (UTC+1)	Dieng 90+5'	Report	Nakamura 79'	Stadium: Stade Raymond Kopa; Attendance: 13,000; Referee: Mathieu Vernice
	Penalties
	Dieng (penalty scored); Niane (penalty missed); Ferhat (penalty scored); Raolisoa (penalty scored)		(penalty scored) Nakamura; (penalty scored) Gabriel Moscardo; (penalty scored) Sangui; (penalty scored) Itō; (penalty scored) Diakité
