= 2022–23 Angers SCO season =

Angers SCO
2022–23 season
- President: Saïd Chabane
- Head coach: Gérald Baticle (until 22 December); Abdel Bouhazama (from 5 January to 7 March); Alexandre Dujeux (from 7 March)
- Stadium: Stade Raymond Kopa
- Ligue 1: 20th (relegated)
- Coupe de France: Round of 16
- Top goalscorer: League: Abdallah Sima (5); All: Abdallah Sima (6)
- Biggest win: Angers 2–1 Montpellier; Nice 0–1 Angers; FCO Strasbourg Koenigshoffen 06 0–1 Angers; Angers 1–0 Lille; Angers 2–1 Troyes
- Biggest defeat: Lyon 5–0 Angers; Montpellier 5–0 Angers
Home colours	Away colours	Third colours

The 2022–23 season was the 104th season in the history of Angers SCO and their eighth consecutive season in the top flight. The club participated in Ligue 1 and the Coupe de France. The season covers the period from 1 July 2022 to 30 June 2023.

== Players ==
=== First-team squad ===
As of 1 February 2023

Note: Flags indicate national team as defined under FIFA eligibility rules; some limited exceptions apply. Players may hold more than one non-FIFA nationality.

No.	Pos.	Nation	Player
1	GK	FRA	Paul Bernardoni
2	DF	FRA	Batista Mendy
3	DF	CIV	Souleyman Doumbia (vice-captain)
4	DF	BIH	Halid Šabanović
5	DF	SLO	Miha Blažič
6	MF	ALG	Nabil Bentaleb (captain)
7	FW	SEN	Ibrahima Niane (on loan from Metz)
8	DF	ALG	Faouzi Ghoulam
9	FW	FRA	Loïs Diony
10	MF	FRA	Himad Abdelli
11	FW	FRA	Amine Salama
14	MF	FRA	Yassin Belkhdim
15	MF	FRA	Pierrick Capelle
16	GK	FRA	Melvin Zinga
17	MF	FRA	Ibrahim Amadou

No.	Pos.	Nation	Player
19	FW	SEN	Abdallah Sima (on loan from Brighton & Hove Albion)
20	FW	GAB	Ulrick Eneme Ella
22	DF	BEN	Cédric Hountondji
23	FW	FRA	Adrien Hunou
24	MF	FRA	Jean-Mattéo Bahoya
25	DF	CIV	Abdoulaye Bamba
26	MF	FRA	Waniss Taïbi
27	MF	FRA	Ali Kalla
29	DF	FRA	Ousmane Camara
30	GK	FRA	Yahia Fofana
31	DF	ALG	Ilyes Chetti
35	FW	FRA	Jason Mbock
40	GK	FRA	Théo Borne
92	FW	SEN	Sada Thioub
94	DF	TUN	Yan Valery

== Transfers ==
=== In ===
Pos.	Player	Transferred from	Fee	Date	Source
FW	(Morocco) Rachid Alioui	(Belgium) Kortrijk	Loan return	1 July 2022	
FW	(Gabon) Ulrick Eneme Ella	(England) Brighton & Hove Albion	Free	1 July 2022	
FW	(France) Amine Salama	(France) Dunkerque	Free	1 July 2022	
DF	(Bosnia and Herzegovina) Halid Šabanović	(Bosnia and Herzegovina) FK Sarajevo	Free	1 July 2022	
MF	(France) Adrien Hunou	(United States) Minnesota United	Undisclosed	1 July 2022	
GK	(France) Yahia Fofana	(France) Le Havre	Free	1 July 2022	
MF	(France) Himad Abdelli	(France) Le Havre	Free	1 July 2022	
DF	(Slovenia) Miha Blažič	(Hungary) Ferencváros	Free	1 July 2022	
FW	(Senegal) Abdallah Sima	(England) Brighton & Hove Albion	Loan	13 July 2022	
DF	(Benin) Cédric Hountondji	(France) Clermont	Undisclosed	18 July 2022	
DF	(Algeria) Ilyes Chetti	(Tunisia) ES Tunis	Undisclosed	19 July 2022	
MF	(France) Ousmane Camara	(France) Paris FC	Undisclosed	16 August 2022	
DF	(France) Ibrahim Amadou	(France) Metz	Free	1 September 2022	
DF	(Tunisia) Yan Valery	(France) Southampton	Undisclosed	1 September 2022	
DF	(Algeria) Faouzi Ghoulam	Unattached	Free	31 January 2023	

=== Out ===
Pos.	Player	Transferred to	Fee	Date	Source
FW	(Morocco) Rachid Alioui	Released	Free	1 July 2022	
MF	(Portugal) Mathias Pereira Lage	(France) Brest	Free	1 July 2022	
MF	(France) Angelo Fulgini	(Germany) Mainz 05	Undisclosed	12 July 2022	
FW	(Cameroon) Stéphane Bahoken	(Turkey) Kasımpaşa	Free	15 July 2022	
MF	(Morocco) Azzedine Ounahi	(France) Marseille	€8 million	29 January 2023	
FW	(Morocco) Sofiane Boufal	(Qatar) Al-Rayyan	Undisclosed	31 January 2023	

== Pre-season and friendlies ==
Win Draw Loss Fixtures

10 July 2022 Friendly	Angers (France)	2–1	(France) Niort	Saint-Martin-de-Ré, France
17:00 CEST (UTC+2)	Diony 12'; Salama 78'		Sagna 8'	Stadium: Complexe Sportif Marcel Gaillard

13 July 2022 Friendly	Angers (France)	2–1	(France) Cholet	La Pommeraye, France
18:00 CEST (UTC+2)	Bentaleb 42'; Hunou 83' (pen.)		Jarju 36'	Stadium: Stade Municipal

17 July 2022 Friendly	Angers (France)	0–0	(France) Laval	Segré, France
18:00 CEST (UTC+2)				Stadium: Stade de la Route de Pouancé

20 July 2022 Friendly	Angers (France)	0–2	(France) Brest	Dinan, France
17:30 CEST (UTC+2)			Dembélé 37'; Belaïli 77'	Stadium: Stade du Clos Gastel

23 July 2022 Friendly	Angers (France)	4–1	(France) Saint-Étienne	Saumur, France
17:00 CEST (UTC+2)	Sima 10'; Diony (penalty missed) 76', 84'; Bobichon 90', 90+4'		Briançon 28'	Stadium: Stade des Rives du Thouet

27 July 2022 Friendly	Sevilla (Spain)	6–0	(France) Angers	Lagoa, Portugal
19:30 WEST (UTC+1)	Ocampos 11'; En-Nesyri 18'; Corona 57'; Lamela 65'; Torres 82'; Iván Romero 88'			Stadium: Estádio Municipal Bela Vista

30 July 2022 Friendly	Angers (France)	2–2	(Italy) Spezia	Angers, France
17:30 CEST (UTC+2)	Hunou 20'; Sima 49' (pen.)		Doumbia 24' (o.g.); Verde 53'	Stadium: Stade Raymond Kopa

9 December 2022 Friendly	Union Saint-Gilloise (Belgium)	3–2	(France) Angers	San Pedro del Pinatar, Spain
14:00 CET (UTC+1)	Eckert 3'; François 53'; Nieuwkoop 58'		El Melali 21'; Bahoya 80'	Stadium: Pinatar Arena

14 December 2022 Friendly	Angers (France)	0–1	(France) Niort	Angers, France
15:00 CET (UTC+1)			Boutobba 37' (pen.)	Stadium: Stade Raymond Kopa

17 December 2022 Friendly	Angers (France)	2–2	(France) Auxerre	Tours, France
17:00 CET (UTC+1)	Bentaleb 7'; Hountondji 85'		Perrin 50'; Sakhi 95'	Stadium: Stade de la Vallée du Cher

21 December 2022 Friendly	Angers (France)	2–1	(France) Laval	Angers, France
15:00 CET (UTC+1)	Hunou 73', 84'		Sylla 90'	Stadium: Stade Raymond Kopa

== Competitions ==
=== Overall record ===
Competition	First match	Last match	Starting round	Final position	Record							
Competition	First match	Last match	Starting round	Final position	Pld	W	D	L	GF	GA	GD	Win %
Ligue 1	7 August 2022	3 June 2023	Matchday 1	20th	38	4	6	28	33	81	−48	10.53
Coupe de France	6 January 2023	8 February 2023	Round of 64	Round of 16	3	1	2	0	2	1	+1	33.33
Total					41	5	8	28	35	82	−47	12.20

Source: Soccerway

=== Ligue 1 ===
==== League table ====
Pos	Team	Pld	W	D	L	GF	GA	GD	Pts	Qualification or relegation
16	Nantes	38	7	15	16	37	55	−18	36	
17	Auxerre (R)	38	8	11	19	35	63	−28	35	Relegation to Ligue 2
18	Ajaccio (R)	38	7	5	26	23	74	−51	26	Relegation to Ligue 2
19	Troyes (R)	38	4	12	22	45	81	−36	24	Relegation to Ligue 2
20	Angers (R)	38	4	6	28	33	81	−48	18	Relegation to Ligue 2

Source: Ligue 1
Rules for classification: 1) Points; 2) Goal difference; 3) Head-to-head points; 4) Head-to-head goal difference; 5) Head-to-head goals scored; 6) Head-to-head away goals scored; 7) Goals scored; 8) Away goals scored; 9) Fair-play points (Note: Head-to-head record is used only after all the matches between the teams in question have been played).
(R) Relegated

==== Results summary ====
Overall								Home						Away					
Pld	W	D	L	GF	GA	GD	Pts	W	D	L	GF	GA	GD	W	D	L	GF	GA	GD
38	4	6	28	33	81	−48	18	3	3	13	20	36	−16	1	3	15	13	45	−32

Source: Ligue 1

==== Results by round ====
Round	1	2	3	4	5	6	7	8	9	10	11	12	13	14	15	16	17	18	19	20	21	22	23	24	25	26	27	28	29	30	31	32	33	34	35	36	37	38
Ground	H	A	H	A	H	A	H	A	H	H	A	H	A	H	A	A	H	A	H	A	H	A	H	A	H	A	H	A	H	H	A	H	A	H	A	A	H	A
Result	D	D	L	L	L	L	W	W	L	L	L	L	L	L	L	L	L	L	L	L	L	D	D	L	L	L	L	L	D	W	L	L	L	L	L	D	W	L
Position	12	11	17	17	19	19	19	14	15	17	19	20	20	20	20	20	20	20	20	20	20	20	20	20	20	20	20	20	20	20	20	20	20	20	20	20	20	20

Source: Ligue 1
A = Away; H = Home; W = Win; D = Draw; L = Loss

==== Matches ====
The league fixtures were announced on 17 June 2022.

7 August 2022 1	Angers	0–0	Nantes	Angers
15:00 CEST (UTC+2)	Capelle (yellow card) 41'; Doumbia (yellow card) 53'	Report	Sissoko (yellow card) 37'; Merlin (yellow card) 60'; Corchia (yellow card) 84'	Stadium: Stade Raymond Kopa; Attendance: 12,000; Referee: Hakim Ben El Hadj

14 August 2022 2	Auxerre	2–2	Angers	Auxerre
15:00 CEST (UTC+2)	Jeanvier 4'; Hountondji 10' (o.g.); Charbonnier (yellow card) 17'; Sinayoko (yellow card) 31' (yellow-red card) 57'; Joly (yellow card) 37'; Da Costa (yellow card) 69'	Report	Mendy (yellow card) 7'; Diony 22'; Ounahi (yellow card) 61'; Salama 77'; Šabanović (yellow card) 83'	Stadium: Stade de l'Abbé-Deschamps; Attendance: 15,577; Referee: Ruddy Buquet

21 August 2022 3	Angers	1–3	Brest	Angers
15:00 CEST (UTC+2)	Šabanović (red card) 34'; Thioub (yellow card) 47'; Diony (yellow card) 49'; Boufal 70'	Report	Le Douaron 10', 38'; Dari 65'	Stadium: Stade Raymond Kopa; Attendance: 8,735; Referee: Jérôme Brisard

28 August 2022 4	Troyes	3–1	Angers	Troyes
15:00 CEST (UTC+2)	Ripart 11'; Salmier (yellow card) 30'; Rami (yellow card) 44'; M. Baldé 60'; Odobert 81'	Report	Mendy (yellow card) 10' (yellow-red card) 20'; Diony 66'; Taïbi (yellow card) 70'	Stadium: Stade de l'Aube; Attendance: 6,673; Referee: Stéphanie Frappart

31 August 2022 5	Angers	2–4	Reims	Angers
19:00 CEST (UTC+2)	Boufal 59' (pen.); Hunou 67'; Thioub (yellow card) 85'	Report	Munetsi 23', (yellow card) 46'; Ito 45+1'; Busi (yellow card) 58'; Cajuste (yellow card) 64' (yellow-red card) 65'; Balogun 70' (pen.); Adeline (yellow card) 80'; Pentz (yellow card) 89'; Flips 90'	Stadium: Stade Raymond Kopa; Attendance: 6,500; Referee: Jérémie Pignard

3 September 2022 6	Lyon	5–0	Angers	Décines-Charpieu
19:00 CEST (UTC+2)	Toko Ekambi 31', 59'; Lacazette 38'; Lukeba 62'; Gusto (yellow card) 54'; Tetê (yellow card) 56'; Dembélé 88'	Report	Boufal (yellow card) 68'	Stadium: Groupama Stadium; Attendance: 39,586; Referee: Thomas Léonard

11 September 2022 7	Angers	2–1	Montpellier	Angers
15:00 CEST (UTC+2)	Hunou 10'; Boufal 69' (pen.); Mendy (yellow card) 80'; Bamba (yellow card) 90+4'	Report	Nordin 7'; Kamara (yellow card) 66'; Leroy (yellow card) 83'; Ferri (yellow card) 90+2'; Khazri (yellow card) 90+3'	Stadium: Stade Raymond Kopa; Attendance: 6,165; Referee: François Letexier

18 September 2022 8	Nice	0–1	Angers	Nice
17:05 CEST (UTC+2)	Todibo (red card) 1'	Report	Hountondji (yellow card) 32'; Boufal (yellow card) 40' (yellow-red card) 62'; Bentaleb 43'; Fofana (yellow card) 87'	Stadium: Allianz Riviera; Attendance: 18,545; Referee: Bastien Dechepy

30 September 2022 9	Angers	0–3	Marseille	Angers
21:00 CEST (UTC+2)		Report	Clauss 35'; Suárez 50'; Gerson 59'	Stadium: Stade Raymond Kopa; Attendance: 19,000; Referee: Johan Hamel

9 October 2022 10	Angers	2–3	Strasbourg	Angers
15:00 CEST (UTC+2)	Hunou 11'; Mendy (yellow card) 32'; Blažič 87'	Report	Gameiro 7'; Blažič 33' (o.g.); Diallo 58'; Pierre-Gabriel (yellow card) 90+4'	Stadium: Stade Raymond Kopa; Attendance: 8,000; Referee: Clément Turpin

16 October 2022 11	Toulouse	3–2	Angers	Toulouse
13:00 CEST (UTC+2)	Dejaegere 10'; Nicolaisen (yellow card) 31'; Van den Boomen 40' (pen.); Aboukhlal (yellow card) 48'; Spierings 67'; Chaïbi (yellow card) 73'	Report	Doumbia (yellow card) 21'; Bentaleb 33'; Amadou (yellow card) 76'; Salama 90+3'	Stadium: Stadium de Toulouse; Attendance: 21,141; Referee: Benoît Bastien

23 October 2022 12	Angers	1–2	Rennes	Angers
13:00 CEST (UTC+2)	Salama 53'; Valery (yellow card) 55'; Amadou (yellow card) 90+1'	Report	Gouiri 43'; Tait (yellow card) 57'; Theate (yellow card) 75'; Majer 90+3' (pen.)	Stadium: Stade Raymond Kopa; Attendance: 11,240; Referee: Pierre Gaillouste

30 October 2022 13	Monaco	2–0	Angers	Monaco
15:00 CET (UTC+1)	Sarr (yellow card) 25'; Ben Yedder (penalty missed) 41'; Minamino (yellow card) 45+2'; Embolo 54'; Golovin 70'; Disasi (yellow card) 84'	Report	Hunou (yellow card) 19'; Bamba (yellow card) 57'; Mendy (yellow card) 85'	Stadium: Stade Louis II; Attendance: 7,069; Referee: Stéphanie Frappart

5 November 2022 14	Angers	1–2	Lens	Angers
21:00 CET (UTC+1)	Capelle (yellow card) 77'; Blažič 87'	Report	Saïd 21'; Medina 51'; Samba (yellow card) 86'; Danso (yellow card) 90+2'	Stadium: Stade Raymond Kopa; Attendance: 11,585; Referee: Thomas Léonard

13 November 2022 15	Lille	1–0	Angers	Villeneuve-d'Ascq
15:00 CET (UTC+1)	Djaló 36'; Ang. Gomes (yellow card) 45'; Baleba (red card) 74'; Fonte (yellow card) 65'; Martin (yellow card) 90+4'	Report	Capelle (yellow card) 62'	Stadium: Stade Pierre-Mauroy; Attendance: 36,360; Referee: Miguel Nogueira

28 December 2022 16	Ajaccio	1–0	Angers	Ajaccio
15:00 CET (UTC+1)	Belaïli 40' (pen.); Youssouf (yellow card) 55'	Report		Stadium: Stade François Coty; Attendance: 7,088; Referee: Jérémy Stinat

1 January 2023 17	Angers	1–2	Lorient	Angers
15:00 CET (UTC+1)	Capelle (yellow card) 4'; Sima 10'; Hountondji (yellow card) 52'	Report	Sima 79' (o.g.); Le Fée 88'	Stadium: Stade Raymond Kopa; Attendance: 6,000; Referee: Florent Batta

11 January 2023 18	Paris Saint-Germain	2–0	Angers	Paris
21:00 CET (UTC+1)	Ekitike 5'; Messi 72'; Neymar (yellow card) 90+2'	Report	Capelle (yellow card) 53'; Blažič (yellow card) 89'	Stadium: Parc des Princes; Attendance: 47,000; Referee: Eric Wattellier

15 January 2023 19	Angers	1–2	Clermont	Angers
15:00 CET (UTC+1)	Capelle (yellow card) 42'; Hountondji (yellow card) 60'; Boufal 80'	Report	Rashani 40'; Borges 47', (yellow card) 79'; Caufriez (yellow card) 83'	Stadium: Stade Raymond Kopa; Attendance: 12,160; Referee: Mathieu Vernice

29 January 2023 20	Brest	4–0	Angers	Brest
15:00 CET (UTC+1)	Le Douaron 14'; Mounié 34'; Honorat 59'; Lees-Melou 84'	Report	Bentaleb (yellow card) 18'; Mendy (yellow card) 49'	Stadium: Stade Francis-Le Blé; Attendance: 12,629; Referee: Marc Bollengier

1 February 2023 21	Angers	1–2	Ajaccio	Angers
15:00 CET (UTC+1)	Sima 13'; Salama (yellow card) 57'; Doumbia (red card) 78'	Report	Marchetti (yellow card) 21'; Diallo (yellow card) 45+1'; Soumano 65'; El Idrissy 90+4'	Stadium: Stade Raymond Kopa; Attendance: 7,255; Referee: Bastien Dechepy

5 February 2023 22	Lorient	0–0	Angers	Lorient
15:00 CET (UTC+1)	Le Fée (yellow card) 74'; Kalulu (yellow card) 88'	Report	Mendy (yellow card) 23'; Chetti (yellow card) 62'; Blažič (yellow card) 89'; Abdelli (yellow card) 90+2'	Stadium: Stade du Moustoir; Attendance: 12,705; Referee: Willy Delajod

12 February 2023 23	Angers	1–1	Auxerre	Angers
15:00 CET (UTC+1)	Raveloson 2' (o.g.); Bentaleb (yellow card) 62'; Blažič (yellow card) 90'	Report	Abline 22' (pen.)	Stadium: Stade Raymond Kopa; Attendance: 7,873; Referee: Thomas Léonard

18 February 2023 24	Strasbourg	2–1	Angers	Strasbourg
21:00 CET (UTC+1)	Diallo 14', 42'; Le Marchand (yellow card) 35'; Sobol (yellow card) 72'; Djiku (yellow card) 74'	Report	Capelle (yellow card) 20'; Hountondji (yellow card) 40'; Bentaleb 73' (pen.)	Stadium: Stade de la Meinau; Attendance: 25,062; Referee: François Letexier

25 February 2023 25	Angers	1–3	Lyon	Angers
17:00 CET (UTC+1)	Sima 87'	Report	Mendes 38'; A. Sarr 80'; Barcola 90'	Stadium: Stade Raymond Kopa; Attendance: 12,031; Referee: Florent Batta

5 March 2023 26	Montpellier	5–0	Angers	Montpellier
15:00 CET (UTC+1)	Khazri 2'; Kouyaté (yellow card) 8'; Savanier 25' (pen.), 51'; Maouassa 45+3'; Wahi 73'	Report	Camara (yellow card) 33'; Bentaleb (yellow card) 57' (yellow-red card) 57'; Blažič (yellow card) 82'	Stadium: Stade de la Mosson; Attendance: 11,664; Referee: Benoît Millot

12 March 2023 27	Angers	0–2	Toulouse	Angers
15:00 CET (UTC+1)		Report	Ratão (yellow card) 32'; Desler 37'; Dallinga 46'	Stadium: Stade Raymond Kopa; Attendance: 6,487; Referee: Pierre Gaillouste

18 March 2023 28	Lens	3–0	Angers	Lens
21:00 CET (UTC+1)	Fofana 26'; Openda 30', 46'	Report		Stadium: Stade Bollaert-Delelis; Attendance: 37,410; Referee: Bastien Dechepy

2 April 2023 29	Angers	1–1	Nice	Angers
15:00 CEST (UTC+2)	Niane 15'; Abdelli (yellow card) 90+3'	Report	Moffi 4'; Ndayishimiye (yellow card) 74'	Stadium: Stade Raymond Kopa; Attendance: 6,649; Referee: Eric Wattellier

8 April 2023 30	Angers	1–0	Lille	Angers
17:00 CEST (UTC+2)	Hountondji (yellow card) 30'; Bentaleb (yellow card) 43'; Šabanović 85'	Report	André (yellow card) 22'; And. Gomes (yellow card) 88'; Gudmundsson (yellow card) 90'	Stadium: Stade Raymond Kopa; Attendance: 7,469; Referee: Mathieu Vernice

16 April 2023 31	Clermont	2–1	Angers	Clermont-Ferrand
15:00 CEST (UTC+2)	Kyei 33' (pen.); Cham 39' (pen.); Neto Borges (red card) 45+2'; Seidu (yellow card) 90', (red card) 90+6'	Report	Hunou 28', (yellow card) 32'; Valery (yellow card) 90+6'	Stadium: Stade Gabriel Montpied; Attendance: 10,789; Referee: Thomas Léonard

23 April 2023 32	Angers	1–2	Paris Saint-Germain	Angers
21:00 CEST (UTC+2)	Thioub 86'	Report	Mbappé 8', 25'	Stadium: Stade Raymond Kopa; Attendance: 16,914; Referee: Eric Wattelier

30 April 2023 33	Rennes	4–2	Angers	Rennes
15:00 CEST (UTC+2)	Gouiri 25'; Hountondji 35' (o.g.); Doku 54', 84'; Wooh (yellow card) 66'	Report	Bentaleb 19' (pen.); Hountondji (yellow card) 23'; Niane 42'; Thioub (yellow card) 69'	Stadium: Roazhon Park; Attendance: 28,028; Referee: Florent Batta

7 May 2023 34	Angers	1–2	Monaco	Angers
13:00 CEST (UTC+2)	Sima 64'; Valery (yellow card) 85'; Niane (yellow card) 89'	Report	Golovin 45'; Disasi (yellow card) 55'; Boadu 60'; Camara (yellow card) 77'; Disasi (yellow card) 55'	Stadium: Stade Raymond Kopa; Attendance: 9,223; Referee: Jérémy Stinat

14 May 2023 35	Marseille	3–1	Angers	Marseille
20:45 CEST (UTC+2)	Sánchez 34'; Payet 48'; Veretout 77' (pen.); Tavares (yellow card) 85'	Report	Niane (yellow card) 19'; Sima 28'; Bentaleb (yellow card) 33'	Stadium: Stade Vélodrome; Attendance: 63,329; Referee: Benoît Millot

21 May 2023 36	Reims	2–2	Angers	Reims
15:00 CEST (UTC+2)	Ito 10'; Balogun 54'	Report	Šabanović 46'; Abdelli 60'; Niane (yellow card) 64'; Fofana (yellow card) 90'	Stadium: Stade Auguste Delaune; Attendance: 11,242; Referee: Florent Batta

27 May 2023 37	Angers	2–1	Troyes	Angers
21:00 CEST (UTC+2)	Abdelli 38'; Niane (yellow card) 67'; Rao-Lisoa 90'	Report	Chavalerin 13'; Kouamé (yellow card) 78'	Stadium: Stade Raymond Kopa; Attendance: 7,419; Referee: Karim Abed

3 June 2023 38	Nantes	1–0	Angers	Nantes
21:00 CEST (UTC+2)	Ganago 16'; Blas (yellow card) 90+4'	Report		Stadium: Stade de la Beaujoire; Attendance: 27,650; Referee: Clément Turpin

=== Coupe de France ===
6 January 2023 Round of 64	Strasbourg	0–0 (4–5 p)	Angers	Strasbourg
18:00 CET (UTC+1)		Report		Stadium: Stade de la Meinau; Attendance: 10,323; Referee: Willy Delajod
	Penalties
	Diallo (penalty scored); Mothiba (penalty scored); Thomasson (penalty scored); Bellegarde (penalty missed); Diarra (penalty scored); Nyamsi (penalty missed)		(penalty scored) Abdelli; (penalty scored) Sima; (penalty scored) Mendy; (penalty scored) Salama; (penalty missed) Bentaleb; (penalty scored) Camara

21 January 2023 Round of 32	FCO Strasbourg Koenigshoffen 06	0–1	Angers	Strasbourg
15:30 CET (UTC+1)		Report	Blažič 16'; Mendy (yellow card) 73'; Salama (yellow card) 82'	Stadium: Stade de la Meinau; Attendance: 18,000; Referee: Jérémie Pignard

8 February 2023 Round of 16	Angers	1–1 (2–4 p)	Nantes	Angers
18:15 CET (UTC+1)	Sima 6'	Report	Guessand (yellow card) 54'; Mollet 87'; Traoré (yellow card) 90'	Stadium: Stade Raymond Kopa; Attendance: 13,934; Referee: Benoît Bastien
	Penalties
	Salama (penalty missed); Ghoulam (penalty missed); Hunou (penalty scored); Thioub (penalty scored)		(penalty scored) Delort; (penalty scored) Mohamed; (penalty scored) Mollet; (penalty scored) João Victor

== Statistics ==
=== Goalscorers ===
Position	Players	Ligue 1	Coupe de France	Total
FW	(France) Abdallah Sima	5	1	6
MF	(Algeria) Nabil Bentaleb	4	0	4
FW	(Morocco) Sofiane Boufal	4	0	4
FW	(France) Adrien Hunou	4	0	4
DF	(Slovenia) Miha Blažič	2	1	3
FW	(France) Amine Salama	3	0	3
MF	(Algeria) Himad Abdelli	2	0	2
DF	(Bosnia and Herzegovina) Halid Šabanović	2	0	2
FW	(France) Loïs Diony	1	0	1
FW	(Senegal) Ibrahima Niane	1	0	1
DF	(France) Lilian Raolisoa	1	0	1
MF	(Senegal) Sada Thioub	1	0	1
