= Nadje =

Nadje is both a given name and a surname. Notable people with the name include:

- Chris-Kévin Nadje (born 2001), Ivorian footballer
- Nadje Noordhuis, Australian trumpeter
- Nadje Sadig Al-Ali (born 1966), German-Iraqi academic
- Noah Nadje (born 2003), French footballer
