= Melvin Zinga =

Congolese footballer (born 2002)

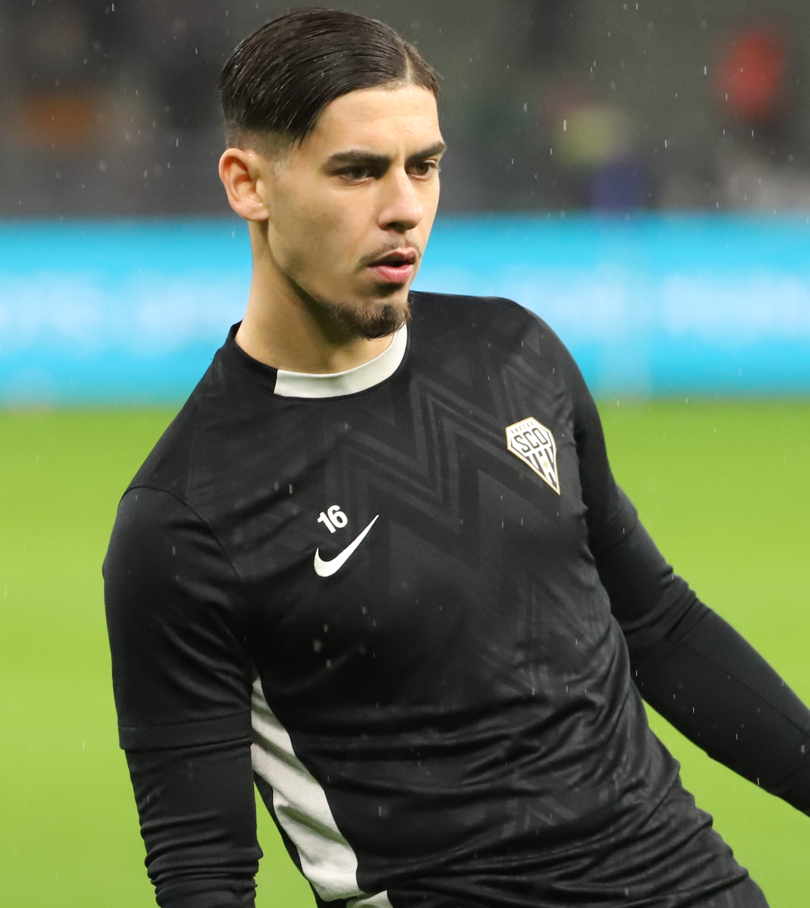
- Zinga with Angers in February 2025

Personal information
- Date of birth: 16 March 2002 (age 24)
- Place of birth: Montivilliers, France
- Height: 1.87 m (6 ft 2 in)
- Position: Goalkeeper

Team information
- Current team: Angers
- Number: 16

Youth career
- 2008–2019: Le Havre

Senior career*
Years	Team	Apps	(Gls)
2019–2020	Le Havre B	8	(0)
2020–	Angers B	19	(0)
2023–	Angers	9	(0)

International career^{‡}
2017–2018	France U16	4	(0)
2018–2019	France U17	12	(0)
2019–2020	France U18	10	(0)
2021–2022	France U20	5	(0)
2026–	Congo	1	(0)
- * Club domestic league appearances and goals as of 17 May 2026 ‡ National team caps and goals as of 29 September 2026

Melvin Zinga (born 16 March 2002) is a professional footballer who plays as a goalkeeper for Ligue 1 club Angers. Born in France, he represents the Congo national team.

== Club career ==
On 11 July 2020, Zinga signed for Angers for a transfer fee of €200,000. On 18 November 2023, he made his senior debut for the club in a 2–0 win over Houilles AC in the seventh round of the Coupe de France. Replacing Yahia Fofana during his absence due to the 2023 Africa Cup of Nations, Zinga played in his first match against a professional side on 6 January 2024, a 1–0 loss away to Brest in the Coupe de France round of 64.

== International career ==
Born in France, Zinga is of partial Republic of the Congo and Malagasy descent and has French, Congolese and Malagasy nationalities. He was a France youth international. He won Lafarge Foot Avenir in 2019 and the Maurice Revello Tournament in 2022 with the under-18 and under-20 teams respectively.

In August 2024, Zinga was called up to the Republic of the Congo national team.

On 29 September 2026, Zinga made his debut for Congo in an AFCON qualifier against Cameroon.

== Player profile ==
Zinga has earned the nickname "kamikaze" among his teammates for his tendency to make daring challenges. In 2023, Angers goalkeeping coach Olivier Tingry said that he is "dynamic, tonic, and rather skillful with his feet", adding that "he is good on his line and has a good vision of the game".

In 2019, Zinga stated that he was a fan of Spanish club Barcelona, and that his football role model was Marc-André ter Stegen.

== Career statistics ==
=== Club ===
As of match played 17 May 2026

Appearances and goals by club, season and competition
Club	Season	League			National cup		Total	
Club	Season	Division	Apps	Goals	Apps	Goals	Apps	Goals
Le Havre B	2018–19	Championnat National 2	1	0	—		1	0
Le Havre B	2019–20	Championnat National 3	7	0	—		7	0
Le Havre B	Total		8	0	—		8	0
Angers B	2020–21	Championnat National 2	4	0	—		33	0
Angers B	2021–22	Championnat National 2	5	0	—		29	0
Angers B	2022–23	Championnat National 2	5	0	—		34	0
Angers B	2023–24	Championnat National 2	2	0	—		34	0
Angers B	2025–26	Championnat National 3	3	0	—		34	0
Angers B	Total		19	0	—		19	0
Angers	2023–24	Ligue 2	5	0	3	0	8	0
Angers	2024–25	Ligue 1	1	0	4	0	5	0
Angers	2025–26	Ligue 1	3	0	0	0	3	0
Angers	2026–27	Ligue 1	0	0	0	0	0	0
Angers	Total		9	0	7	0	16	0
Career total			36	0	7	0	43	0

== Honours ==
France U18

- Lafarge Foot Avenir: 2019

France U20

- Maurice Revello Tournament: 2022
