= Justin Kalumba =

French footballer (born 2003)

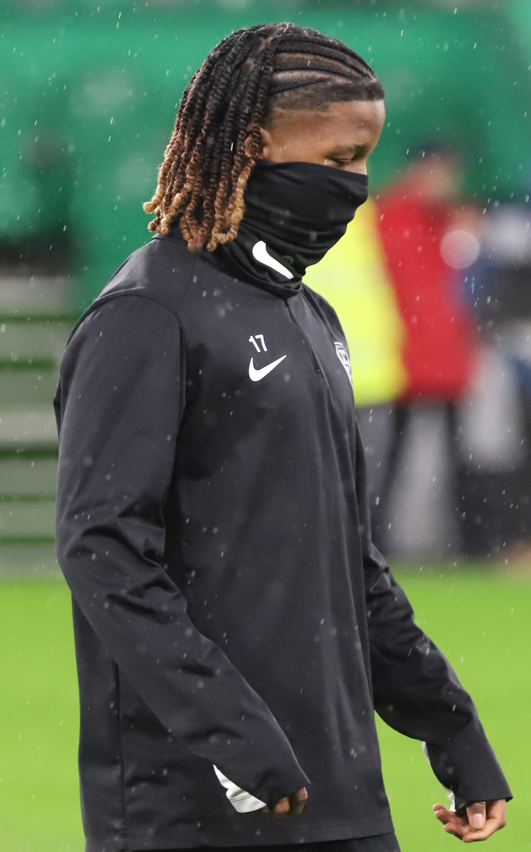

Personal information
- Full name: Justin-Noël Kalumba Mwana Ngongo
- Date of birth: 25 December 2004 (age 21)
- Place of birth: Roubaix, France
- Position: Winger

Team information
- Current team: Mallorca
- Number: 30

Youth career
- 2015–2016: FC Seclin
- 2016–2017: AS Templeuve
- 2017–2022: Lille
- 2022–2023: Angers

Senior career*
Years	Team	Apps	(Gls)
2023–2026	Angers II	25	(4)
2023–2026	Angers	26	(0)
2026–	Mallorca	1	(0)

International career
2024	France U20	6	(0)
- * Club domestic league appearances and goals as of 24 October 2026

Justin-Noël Kalumba Mwana Ngongo (born 25 December 2004) is a French professional footballer who plays as a winger for Segunda División club Mallorca.

== Club career ==
=== Angers ===
A youth product of Lille for 5 years, Kalumba moved to Angers in the summer of 2023 on a two-year contract. He began playing with their reserves in early 2023. He made his senior and professional debut with Angers as a starter in a 1–1 Ligue 1 tie with Nice on 2 April 2023, where he played a left wing-back.

=== Mallorca ===
On 16 January 2026, Kalumba signed a three-and-a-half-year contract with La Liga side Mallorca.

== International career ==
Born in France, Kalumba is of DR Congolese descent. He was called up to the France U19s in January 2021.

== Playing style ==
Kalumba is a right winger, who also plays with a mix of support and speed.

== Career statistics ==
=== Club ===
As of match played 24 October 2026

Appearances and goals by club, season and competition
Club	Season	League			Cup		Europe		Other		Total	
Club	Season	Division	Apps	Goals	Apps	Goals	Apps	Goals	Apps	Goals	Apps	Goals
Angers II	2022–23	CFA	7	0	—		—		—		7	0
Angers II	2023–24	CFA	6	1	—		—		—		6	1
Angers II	2024–25	CFA	5	0	—		—		—		5	0
Angers II	2025–26	CFA	7	3	—		—		—		7	3
Angers II	Total		25	4	—		—		—		25	4
Angers	2022–23	Ligue 1	7	0	—		—		—		7	0
Angers	2023–24	Ligue 2	13	0	2	0	—		—		15	0
Angers	2024–25	Ligue 1	2	0	1	0	—		—		3	0
Angers	2025–26	Ligue 1	4	0	0	0	—		—		4	0
Angers	Total		26	0	3	0	—		—		29	0
Mallorca	2026–27	Segunda División	1	0	0	0	—		—		1	0
Career total			52	4	3	0	0	0	0	0	55	4
