= Jean-Mattéo Bahoya =

French footballer (born 2005)

Personal information
- Full name: Jean-Mattéo Bahoya Négoce
- Date of birth: 7 May 2005 (age 21)
- Place of birth: Montfermeil, France
- Height: 1.80 m (5 ft 11 in)
- Positions: Left winger; attacking midfielder

Team information
- Current team: Leeds United (on loan from Eintracht Frankfurt)
- Number: 23

Youth career
- 2011–2012: FE Trélazé
- 2012–2014: ES Andard Brain
- 2014–2022: Angers

Senior career*
Years	Team	Apps	(Gls)
2022–2023	Angers II	9	(4)
2023–2024	Angers	29	(5)
2024–	Eintracht Frankfurt	59	(5)
2026–	→ Leeds United (loan)	1	(0)

International career^{‡}
2022–2023	France U18	7	(0)
2023–2024	France U19	10	(2)
2025–	France U21	7	(2)
Medal record
Men's football
Representing France
UEFA European Under-19 Championship
Runner-up	2024 Northern Ireland
- * Club domestic league appearances and goals as of 20 September 2026 ‡ National team caps and goals as of 29 September 2026

Jean-Mattéo Bahoya Négoce (born 7 May 2005) is a French professional footballer who plays as a left winger or attacking midfielder for Premier League club Leeds United, on loan from Bundesliga club Eintracht Frankfurt.

== Club career ==
Bahoya is a youth product of Foyer Espérance Trélazé, and ES Andard Brain, before moving to the youth academy of Angers in 2014 . He was the top scorer for the U17s with Angers, with 30 goals in 25 matches.

=== Angers ===
On 16 May 2022, he signed his first professional contract with Angers until 2025. He was called up to their senior team for the first time in August 2022. He made his professional and senior debut with Angers in a 0–0 (5–4) penalty shootout win over Strasbourg on 6 January 2023.

=== Eintracht Frankfurt ===
On 25 January 2024, Bahoya signed a 5.5-year contract with Eintracht Frankfurt in Germany. On 16 March 2025, he netted his first Bundesliga goal in a 3–1 away win over VfL Bochum. In the 2024–25 season, he recorded the fastest sprint in the league at 37.16 kilometres per hour (23.09 mph).

=== Leeds United (loan) ===
On 1 September 2026, Bahoya joined Premier League side Leeds United on loan with an obligation to buy. He made his league debut for The Whites as a 91st-minute substitute at Elland Road for Gabriel Gudmundsson in a goalless result against Crystal Palace on 20 September 2026.

== International career ==
Born in France, Bahoya was born to a Cameroonian father and French mother. He holds French and Cameroonian nationalities. He is a youth international for France, having played for the France U18s in November 2022.

== Career statistics ==
As of match played 20 September 2026

Appearances and goals by club, season and competition
Club	Season	League			National cup (Note: Includes Coupe de France)		League cup		Europe		Total	
Club	Season	Division	Apps	Goals	Apps	Goals	Apps	Goals	Apps	Goals	Apps	Goals
Angers II	2021–22	CFA 2	1	1	—		—		–		1	1
Angers II	2022–23	CFA 2	8	3	—		—		—		8	3
Angers II	Total		9	4	—		—		—		9	4
Angers	2022–23	Ligue 1	10	0	1	0	—		—		11	0
Angers	2023–24	Ligue 2	19	5	2	0	—		—		321	5
Angers	Total		29	5	3	0	—		—		32	5
Eintracht Frankfurt	2023–24	Bundesliga	8	0	—		—		—		8	0
Eintracht Frankfurt	2024–25	Bundesliga	23	2	0	0	—		9 (Note: Appearances in UEFA Europa League)	1	32	3
Eintracht Frankfurt	2025–26	Bundesliga	27	3	2	1	—		8 (Note: Appearances in UEFA Champions League)	0	37	4
Eintracht Frankfurt	Total		59	5	2	1	—		17	1	77	7
Leeds United (loan)	2026–27	Premier League	1	0	0	0	0	0	—		1	0
Career total			98	14	5	1	0	0	17	1	119	16

== Honours ==
France U19

- UEFA European Under-19 Championship runner-up: 2024
