= Loïs Diony =

French footballer (born 1992)

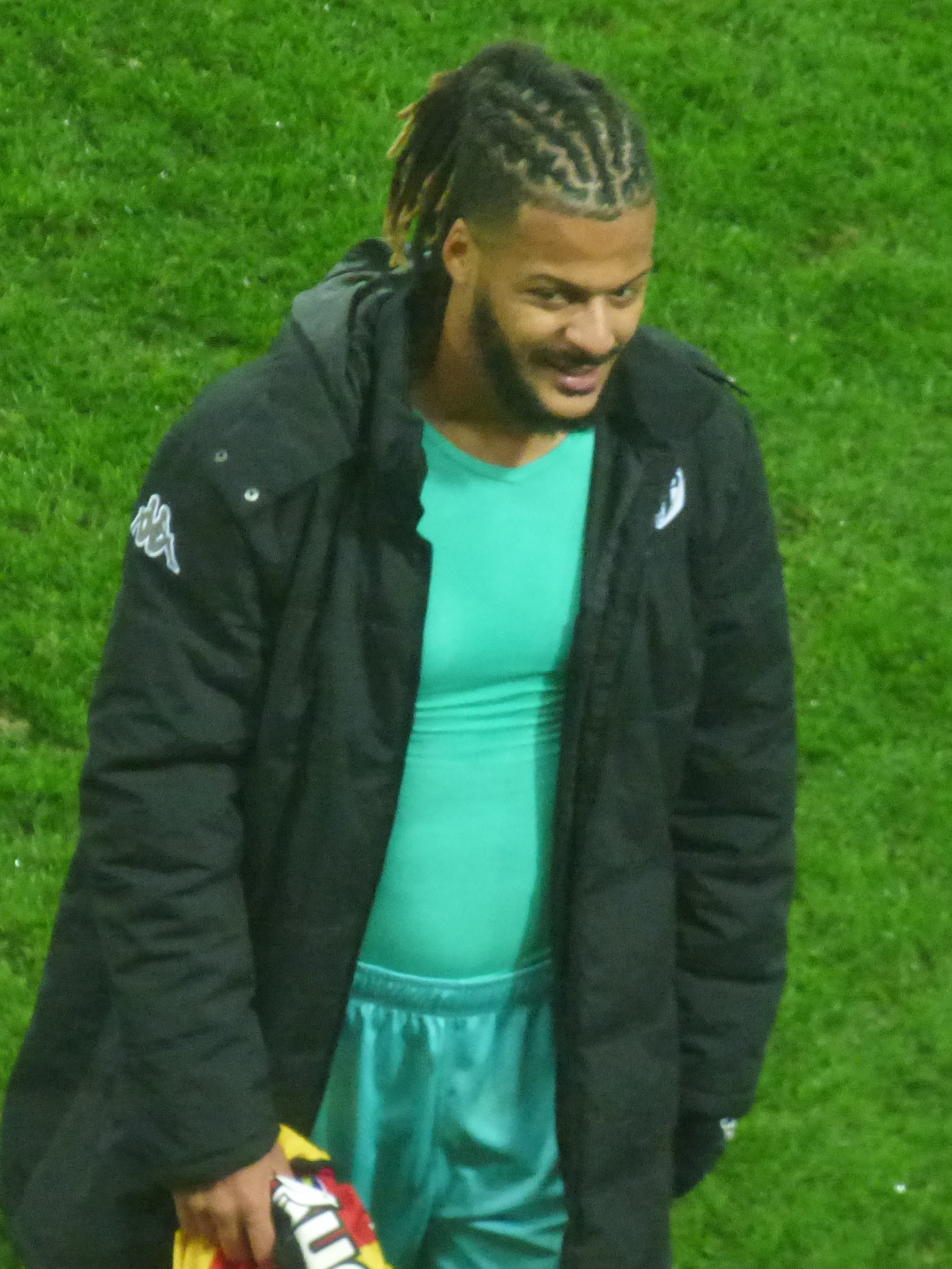
- Diony with Saint-Étienne in 2020

Personal information
- Date of birth: 20 December 1992 (age 33)
- Place of birth: Mont-de-Marsan, France
- Height: 1.86 m (6 ft 1 in)
- Position: Striker

Team information
- Current team: Omonia
- Number: 99

Youth career
- 2010–2011: Bordeaux
- 2011–2012: Nantes

Senior career*
Years	Team	Apps	(Gls)
2012–2013	Nantes B	24	(7)
2012	Nantes	1	(0)
2013–2014	Mont-de-Marsan	13	(8)
2014–2016	Dijon B	5	(4)
2014–2017	Dijon	107	(27)
2017–2020	Saint-Étienne	58	(7)
2018	→ Bristol City (loan)	7	(0)
2019	Saint-Étienne B	1	(0)
2020–2025	Angers	83	(22)
2021–2022	→ Red Star Belgrade (loan)	8	(1)
2024–2025	Angers II	10	(5)
2025	→ Bandırmaspor (loan)	16	(4)
2025–2026	Manisa	38	(22)
2026–	Omonia	10	(6)
- * Club domestic league appearances and goals as of 22 November 2026

Loïs Diony (born 20 December 1992) is a French professional footballer who plays as a striker for Cypriot First Division club Omonia.

== Club career ==
=== Early career ===
Diony made his professional debut in November 2012 for Nantes, in a 0–0 draw against Niort.

After spending six months in the fourth division with his hometown club Stade Montois, he joined Dijon in January 2014.

=== Dijon ===
With Diony securing a move to Ligue 2 side Dijon, he proved to be a vital asset as he was their top scorer as they achieved promotion into Ligue 1. The following season, Diony was again Dijon's top scorer - with 11 goals - helping them maintain their Ligue 1 position.

=== Saint-Étienne ===
In 2017 Diony made a move to Saint-Étienne, but he made a slow start with Les Verts, recording no goals and just one assist in his first 16 games for the club, causing him to be loaned out at the start of 2018.

==== Bristol City (loan) ====
On 25 January 2018, Loïs Diony joined Bristol City on loan for the remainder of the 2017–18 with the option to make it permanent for a reported £10 million. Despite looking a promising addition, Diony's stint in England was unsuccessful, and he played just seven times, contributing to 0 goals in the process.

=== Angers ===
On 10 September 2020, Diony signed with Ligue 1 side Angers. He joined on a free transfer, but the deal included a sell-on percentage fee clause. Diony agreed on a three-year contract with Angers.

==== Red Star Belgrade (loan) ====
On 5 July 2021, he went to Red Star Belgrade on loan.

== Personal life ==
Diony is of Martiniquais and Malagasy descent.

== Career statistics ==
As of match played 14 December 2024

Appearances and goals by club, season and competition
Club	Season	League			National cup		League cup		Europe		Other		Total	
Club	Season	Division	Apps	Goals	Apps	Goals	Apps	Goals	Apps	Goals	Apps	Goals	Apps	Goals
Nantes	2012–13	Ligue 2	2	0	1	0	0	0	—		—		3	0
Stade Montois	2013–14	CFA	13	8	1	1	—		—		—		14	9
Dijon	2013–14	Ligue 2	10	3	—		0	0	—		—		10	3
Dijon	2014–15	Ligue 2	33	3	1	1	2	1	—		—		36	5
Dijon	2015–16	Ligue 2	29	11	1	0	3	3	—		—		33	14
Dijon	2016–17	Ligue 1	35	11	2	1	1	0	—		—		38	12
Dijon	Total		107	28	4	2	6	4	0	0	0	0	117	34
Saint-Étienne	2017–18	Ligue 1	16	0	1	0	0	0	—		—		17	0
Saint-Étienne	2018–19	Ligue 1	30	5	2	2	0	0	—		—		32	7
Saint-Étienne	2019–20	Ligue 1	12	2	3	0	0	0	—		1	0	16	2
Saint-Étienne	Total		58	7	6	2	0	0	0	0	1	0	65	9
Bristol City (loan)	2017–18	Championship	7	0	—		—		—		—		7	0
Angers	2020–21	Ligue 1	36	5	2	0	—		—		—		38	5
Angers	2022–23	Ligue 1	11	2	0	0	—		—		—		11	2
Angers	2023–24	Ligue 2	35	15	2	1	—		—		—		37	16
Angers	2024–25	Ligue 1	1	0	0	0	—		—		—		1	0
Angers	Total		83	22	4	1	0	0	0	0	0	0	87	23
Red Star Belgrade (loan)	2021–22	Serbian SuperLiga	8	1	0	0	—		9	2	—		17	3
Angers II	2024–25	National 3	10	5	—		—		—		—		10	5
Career total			277	66	16	6	6	4	9	2	1	0	309	77

== Honours ==
Saint-Étienne

- Coupe de France runner-up: 2019–20

Red Star Belgrade

- Serbian SuperLiga: 2021–22
- Serbian Cup: 2021–22

Individual

- UNFP Ligue 2 Team of the Year: 2023–24
