= Ousmane Camara (footballer, born 2003) =

Malian footballer (born 2003)

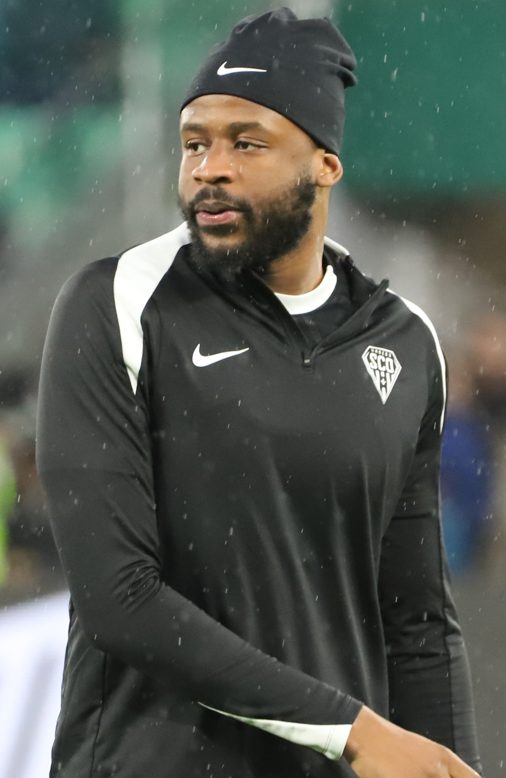
- Camara with Angers in 2025

Personal information
- Full name: Ousmane Camara
- Date of birth: 6 March 2003 (age 23)
- Place of birth: Paris, France
- Height: 1.97 m (6 ft 6 in)
- Position: Midfielder

Team information
- Current team: Angers
- Number: 4

Youth career
- 2011–2012: FC Cap-Vert
- 2012–2020: Paris FC

Senior career*
Years	Team	Apps	(Gls)
2020–2022	Paris FC	37	(0)
2020	Paris FC B	4	(0)
2022–	Angers	53	(1)
2022–	Angers B	14	(1)

International career^{‡}
2021–2022	France U19	15	(1)
2022–2023	France U20	4	(0)
2025–	Mali	11	(0)
- * Club domestic league appearances and goals as of 20 September 2026 ‡ National team caps and goals as of 21:01, 4 October 2026 (UTC)

Ousmane Camara (born 6 March 2003) is a professional footballer who plays as a midfielder for Ligue 1 club Angers. Born in France, he plays for the Mali national team.

== Career ==
Camara made his professional debut with Paris FC in a 3–0 Ligue 2 win over Chambly on 22 August 2020. On 5 November 2020, Camara signed his first professional contract with Paris FC, until June 2023.

On 16 August 2022, Camara signed a four-year contract with Angers.

== International career ==
Born in France, Camara is of Malian and Guinean descent. He is a youth international for France, having played for the France U19s.

On 11 December 2025, Camara was called up to the Mali squad for the 2025 Africa Cup of Nations.

== Career statistics ==
=== Club ===
As of match played 20 September 2026

Appearances and goals by club, season and competition
Club	Season	League			National cup		Other		Total	
Club	Season	Division	Apps	Goals	Apps	Goals	Apps	Goals	Apps	Goals
Paris FC	2020–21	Ligue 2	2	0	0	0	—		2	0
Paris FC	2021–22	Ligue 2	35	0	0	0	1 (Note: Appearance in Ligue 1 relegation/promotion play-offs)	0	36	0
Paris FC	Total		37	0	0	0	1	0	38	0
Paris FC B	2020–21	National 3	4	0	—		—		4	0
Angers	2022–23	Ligue 1	9	0	3	0	—		12	0
Angers	2023–24	Ligue 2	4	0	2	0	—		6	0
Angers	2024–25	Ligue 1	3	0	0	0	—		3	0
Angers	2025–26	Ligue 1	32	1	0	0	—		32	1
Angers	2026–27	Ligue 1	5	0	0	0	—		5	0
Angers	Total		52	1	5	0	—		57	1
Angers B	2022–23	CFA	2	0	—		—		2	0
Angers B	2023–24	CFA	2	0	—		—		2	0
Angers B	2024–25	CFA	12	1	—		—		12	1
Angers B	Total		14	1	—		—		14	1
Career total			106	2	5	0	1	0	112	2

=== International ===
As of match played 4 October 2026

Appearances and goals by national team and year
National team	Year	Apps	Goals
Mali	2025	5	0
Mali	2026	6	0
Total		11	0
