= Théo Borne =

French footballer (born 2002)

Personal information
- Date of birth: 15 July 2002 (age 24)
- Place of birth: Montbéliard, France
- Height: 1.91 m (6 ft 3 in)
- Position: Goalkeeper

Team information
- Current team: Grenoble
- Number: 25

Senior career*
Years	Team	Apps	(Gls)
2021–2023	Angers B	39	(0)
2023–2025	Clermont B	35	(0)
2024–2025	Clermont	0	(0)
2025–2026	Sochaux B	0	(0)
2026	Dynamo České Budějovice	7	(0)
2026	Dynamo České Budějovice B	1	(0)
2026–	Grenoble	0	(0)
- * Club domestic league appearances and goals as of 4 September 2026

Théo Borne (born 15 July 2002) is a French professional footballer who plays as a goalkeeper for Ligue 2 club Grenoble.

== Early life ==
As a youth player, Borne joined the youth academy of French side Sochaux. He is a native of Montbéliard, France.

== Career ==
Borne started his career with French Ligue 1 side Angers. He was regarded as one of the club's reserve teams' most important players. He started training with the first team during the second half of the 2021–22 season. In 2023, he signed for French Ligue 1 side Clermont. On 21 January 2024, he debuted for the club during a 1–3 Coupe de France loss to Strasbourg.

On 14 February 2026, Borne signed a contract with Czech National Football League club Dynamo České Budějovice.
