= Yahia Fofana =

Footballer (born 2000)

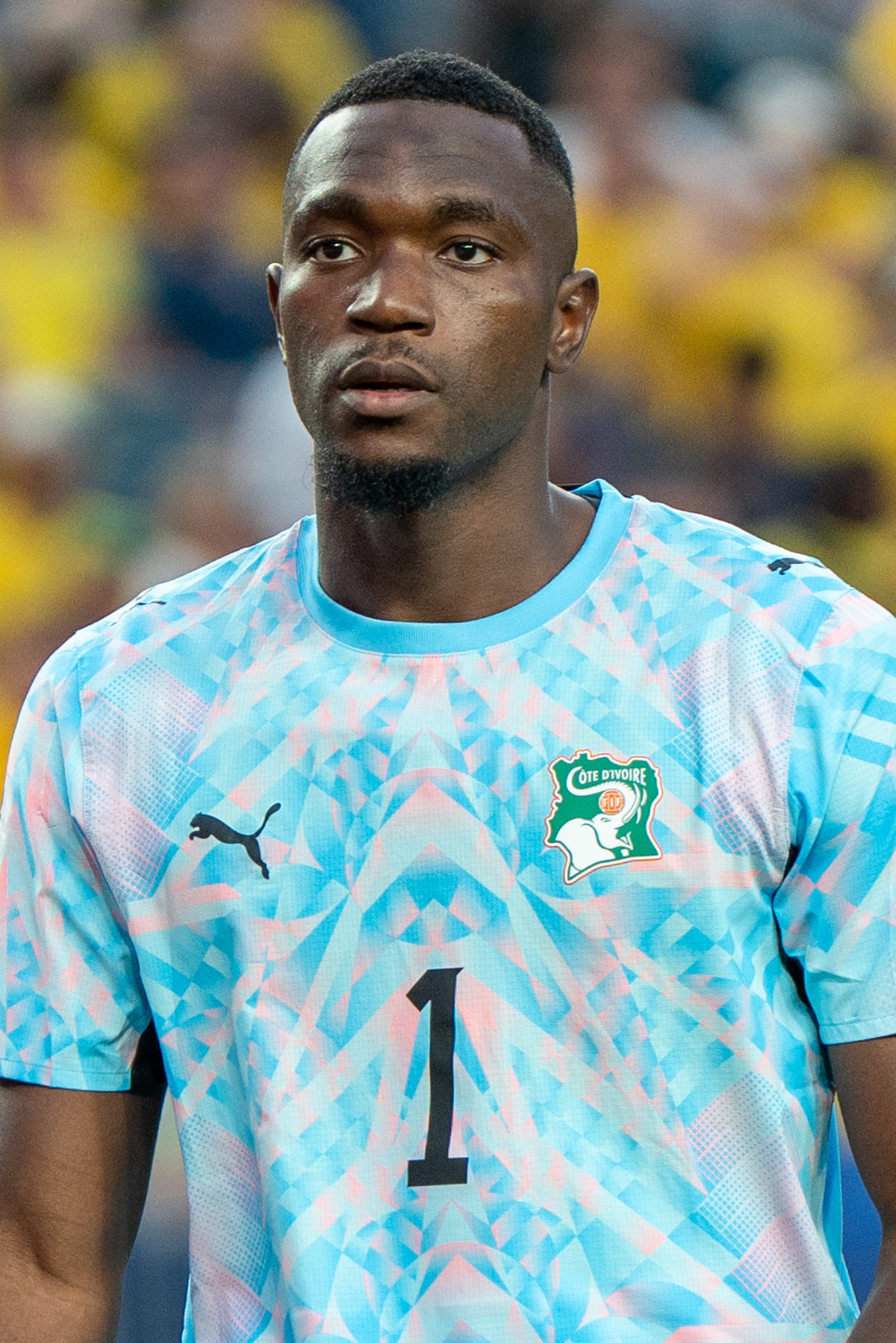
- Fofana with Ivory Coast in 2026

Personal information
- Full name: Yahia Fofana
- Date of birth: 21 August 2000 (age 26)
- Place of birth: Paris, France
- Height: 1.94 m (6 ft 4 in)
- Position: Goalkeeper

Team information
- Current team: Çaykur Rizespor
- Number: 75

Youth career
- 2008–2013: Espérance Paris 19ème
- 2013–2015: Red Star
- 2015–2019: Le Havre

Senior career*
Years	Team	Apps	(Gls)
2016–2019	Le Havre B	32	(0)
2019–2022	Le Havre	38	(0)
2022–2025	Angers	77	(0)
2025–	Çaykur Rizespor	27	(0)

International career^{‡}
2016	France U16	5	(0)
2017	France U17	2	(0)
2017–2018	France U18	9	(0)
2018–2019	France U19	4	(0)
2022	France U21	1	(0)
2023–	Ivory Coast	39	(0)
Medal record
Representing Ivory Coast
Men's football
Africa Cup of Nations
Winner	2023 Ivory Coast
- * Club domestic league appearances and goals as of 20:00, 15 May 2026 (UTC) ‡ National team caps and goals as of 19:10, 30 June 2026 (UTC)

Yahia Fofana (born 21 August 2000) is a professional footballer who plays as a goalkeeper for Süper Lig club Çaykur Rizespor. Born in France, he plays for the Ivory Coast national team.

== Club career ==
=== Le Havre ===
A product of Le Havre's academy, Fofana signed his first professional contract on 4 July 2019, with the deal lasting until 2022. His debut came not long after, as he started a Coupe de la Ligue match against Clermont on 13 August. The match ended in a 4–3 victory for Clermont on penalties after a 1–1 draw.

Fofana's Coupe de France debut came on 19 January 2021, as his side lost to Paris FC by a score of 1–0. On 30 January, he played his first match in Ligue 2, coming on as a substitute after Mathieu Gorgelin had been handed a red card in a 0–0 draw away to Chamois Niortais. In the 2021–22 season with Le Havre, he broke into the first team as the starting goalkeeper, surpassing Gorgelin in the pecking order.

=== Angers ===
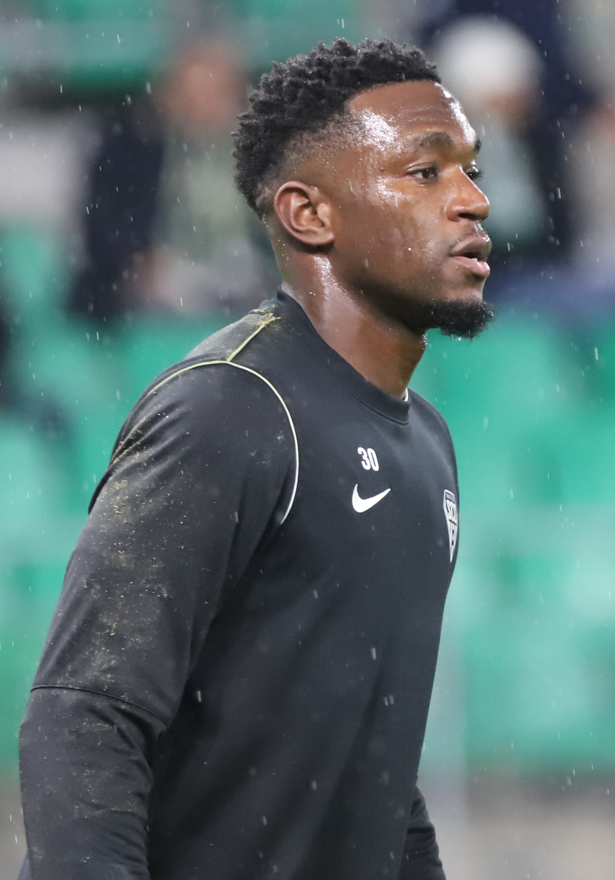
Fofana with Angers in 2025

In January 2022, Fofana signed a four-year contract with Angers, agreeing to join the club on a free transfer upon the expiry of his contract with his then club, Le Havre. He joined Angers in July 2022 and was assigned the number 30 shirt for his first season at the club.

In the 2022–23 season, Fofana made 11 appearances in Ligue 1. At the start of the season, he competed for the starting goalkeeper position with Paul Bernardoni, Danijel Petković, and Anthony Mandrea. On 11 September 2022, he made his debut for Angers in a match against Montpellier, in which Angers won 2–1. Fofana subsequently competed for a regular place in the starting lineup.

Angers finished bottom of Ligue 1 in the 2022–23 season and were relegated to Ligue 2. However, Fofana established himself as the club's first-choice goalkeeper the following season. In the 2023–24 season, he made 33 appearances in Ligue 2 and helped Angers finish second and secure promotion to Ligue 1. Fofana described the promotion as the best moment of his time at Angers, while the club also regarded his performances as an important part of their promotion campaign.

In the 2024–25 season, Angers returned to Ligue 1, and Fofana started all 33 of the club's league matches. He kept seven clean sheets and was named the club's Player of the Season by Angers supporters.

After spending three seasons at Angers, Fofana transferred to Çaykur Rizespor in the summer of 2025.

=== Çaykur Rizespor ===
On 2 September 2025, Fofana transferred to Çaykur Rizespor. After leaving Angers, he signed a contract with Rizespor until 30 June 2028. In the 2025–26 season, Fofana served as Rizespor's first-choice goalkeeper in the Süper Lig, recording 88 saves while conceding 42 goals. He kept six clean sheets, as Rizespor finished eighth in the league.

In the 2026–27 season, Fofana has continued to serve as Rizespor's first-choice goalkeeper. As of 20 September 2026, he had started all six of the club's Süper Lig matches, playing 540 minutes and making 22 saves from 28 shots on target faced. He had kept two clean sheets. Rizespor drew 2–2 with Göztepe in the match played on that date.

== International career ==
Born in France, Fofana is of Ivorian descent. He has represented France at U16, U17, U18, and U19 level over the years. Fofana was called up to the Ivory Coast national team for a set of 2023 Africa Cup of Nations qualification matches in September 2023. He debuted in a 1–0 win over Lesotho on 9 September 2023. In December 2023, Fofana was named to the Ivory Coast's squad for the 2023 Africa Cup of Nations. He played in all matches but the opening one. Ivory Coast ended up winning the tournament. Fofana is included in the list of Ivorian players selected by head coach Emerse Faé to participate in the 2025 Africa Cup of Nations. On May 15, 2026, Fofana was integrated by Ivory Coast coach Emerse Faé in his list of 26 players in order to participate in the 2026 World Cup.

== Career statistics ==
=== Club ===
As of match played 15 May 2026

Appearances and goals by club, season and competition
Club	Season	League			National cup		League cup		Other		Total	
Club	Season	Division	Apps	Goals	Apps	Goals	Apps	Goals	Apps	Goals	Apps	Goals
Le Havre B	2015–16	CFA 2	1	0	—		—		—		1	0
Le Havre B	2016–17	CFA	1	0	—		—		—		1	0
Le Havre B	2017–18	National 2	10	0	—		—		—		10	0
Le Havre B	2018–19	National 2	18	0	—		—		—		18	0
Le Havre B	2019–20	National 3	2	0	—		—		—		2	0
Le Havre B	Total		32	0	—		—		—		32	0
Le Havre	2018–19	Ligue 2	0	0	1	0	0	0	—		1	0
Le Havre	2019–20	Ligue 2	0	0	0	0	1 (Note: Appearance in Coupe de la Ligue)	0	—		1	0
Le Havre	2020–21	Ligue 2	3	0	1	0	—		—		4	0
Le Havre	2021–22	Ligue 2	35	0	0	0	—		—		35	0
Le Havre	Total		38	0	2	0	1	0	—		41	0
Angers	2022–23	Ligue 1	11	0	0	0	—		—		11	0
Angers	2023–24	Ligue 2	33	0	0	0	—		—		33	0
Angers	2024–25	Ligue 1	33	0	0	0	—		—		33	0
Angers	Total		77	0	0	0	—		—		77	0
Çaykur Rizespor	2025–26	Süper Lig	27	0	0	0	—		—		27	0
Career total			174	0	2	0	1	0	0	0	177	0

=== International ===
As of match played 30 June 2026

Appearances and goals by national team and year
National team	Year	Apps	Goals
Ivory Coast	2023	5	0
Ivory Coast	2024	18	0
Ivory Coast	2025	8	0
Ivory Coast	2026	8	0
Total		39	0

== Honours ==
Ivory Coast

- Africa Cup of Nations: 2023
