= Emmanuel Biumla =

Footballer (born 2005)

Personal information
- Full name: Emmanuel Junior Biumla Bayiha
- Date of birth: 8 May 2005 (age 21)
- Place of birth: Yopougon, Abidjan, Ivory Coast
- Height: 1.85 m (6 ft 1 in)
- Positions: Centre-back; defensive midfielder

Team information
- Current team: Angers
- Number: 24

Youth career
- –2019: Stade Bordelais
- 2019–2023: Bordeaux

Senior career*
Years	Team	Apps	(Gls)
2022–2024	Bordeaux B	17	(2)
2023–2024	Bordeaux	8	(1)
2024–	Angers	26	(1)
2025–	Angers B	5	(0)

International career^{‡}
2023	France U19	3	(1)
2024–2025	France U20	7	(1)
- * Club domestic league appearances and goals as of 20 May 2026 ‡ National team caps and goals as of 9 June 2025

Emmanuel Junior Biumla Bayiha (born 8 May 2005) is a professional footballer who plays as a centre-back and defensive midfielder for Ligue 1 club Angers. Born in Ivory Coast, he holds Cameroonian and French citizenship and represents France at youth international level.

== Club career ==
On 14 June 2023, Biumla signed his first professional contract with Bordeaux, a deal until 2026. He made his Ligue 2 debut in a 0–0 draw against Ajaccio on 21 August 2023, with his performance being hailed as "convincing" by observers.

On 31 July 2024, Biumla joined Ligue 1 club Angers on a three-year contract.

== International career ==
On 9 September 2023, Biumla made his first appearance for the France under-19s in a 2–0 victory over Hungary, playing the full match. Three days later, he scored the only goal in a 1–0 win over Serbia. After his first call-up in September, he received another call-up in October.

== Personal life ==
Biumla was born in Yopougon, near Abidjan, Ivory Coast. He is of Cameroonian descent, and holds Cameroonian and French citizenship.

== Honours ==
France U20

- Maurice Revello Tournament: 2025
