= Yan Valery =

Footballer (born 1999)

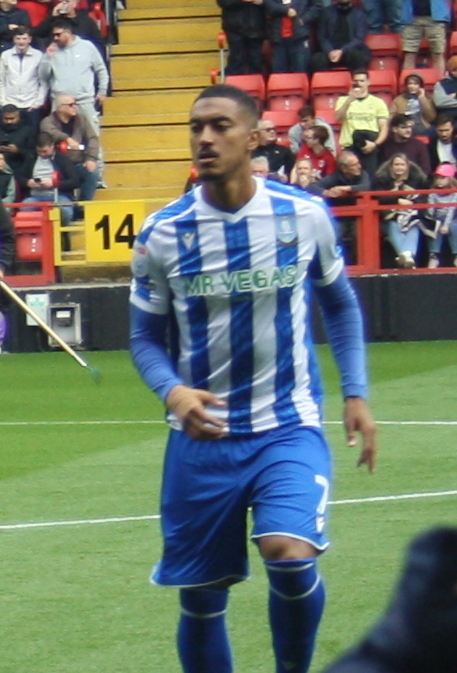
- Valery with Sheffield Wednesday in 2025

Personal information
- Full name: Yan Valery
- Date of birth: 22 February 1999 (age 27)
- Place of birth: Champigny-sur-Marne, France
- Height: 1.85 m (6 ft 1 in)
- Position: Right-back

Team information
- Current team: Sheffield Wednesday
- Number: 7

Youth career
- 2005–2007: AS Outre-Mer du Bois l'Abbé
- 2009–2013: Champigny FC 94
- 2013–2015: Rennes
- 2015–2017: Southampton

Senior career*
Years	Team	Apps	(Gls)
2018–2022	Southampton	43	(2)
2021	→ Birmingham City (loan)	7	(0)
2022–2024	Angers	65	(0)
2024–	Sheffield Wednesday	76	(4)
2026	→ Young Boys (loan)	14	(0)

International career^{‡}
2015–2016	France U17	7	(0)
2017	France U18	1	(0)
2022–	Tunisia	26	(0)
- * Club domestic league appearances and goals as of 21:58, 20 November 2026 (UTC) ‡ National team caps and goals as of 08:47, 25 September 2026 (UTC)

Yan Valery (Arabic: يان فاليري; born 22 February 1999) is a professional footballer who plays as a right-back for EFL League One club Sheffield Wednesday. Born in France, he plays for the Tunisia national team.

He began his senior career in England with Premier League club Southampton and spent the second half of the 2020–21 season on loan at Championship club Birmingham City before joining Angers in 2022. Valery moved to Sheffield Wednesday in June 2024 and had a short spell on loan at Young Boys during the 2025–26 season.

In international football, he represented his native France at under-17 and under-18 levels before switching to his mother's country of Tunisia at senior level in 2022.

== Early life ==
Valery was born in Champigny-sur-Marne, France to a Martiniquais father and Tunisian mother. He is a Muslim.

== Club career ==
=== Southampton ===
Valery joined Southampton in 2015 from Rennes. On 27 November 2018, Southampton boss Mark Hughes handed Valery his first team debut in an EFL Cup match against Leicester City. Four days later, he made his league debut, playing the whole match in a 2–2 draw against Manchester United.

On 2 March 2019, Valery scored his first Southampton goal in a 3–2 defeat away to Manchester United, opening the scoring with "an outstanding finish". The week later, Valery scored again in a 2–1 win at home to Tottenham Hotspur. Valery ended the season with a total of 23 appearances. At the end of the season, Valery was voted as 'Saints Young Player of the Season'.

Despite this, the 2019–20 season would be tough for Valery, who only made a total of 11 starts for Southampton. Valery later revealed that he had glandular fever which kept him out for a significant part of the season. The arrival of Kyle Walker-Peters from Tottenham Hotspur, initially on loan, made it harder for Valery to get back into the Southampton first team.

On 26 January 2021, Valery made his first Premier League start of the season in Southampton's 3–1 defeat to Arsenal.

==== Loan to Birmingham City ====
On 1 February 2021, Valery joined Championship club Birmingham City for the remainder of the 2020–21 season. He made his debut five days later as a late substitute in a 3–2 loss away to Bournemouth, and replaced Maxime Colin in the starting eleven for the next fixture, another defeat. He made seven appearances (two starts) in the early part of his loan spell but had no matchday involvement after Lee Bowyer took over as head coach in mid-March.

=== Angers ===
On 1 September 2022, Valery joined Ligue 1 club Angers on a four-year contract.

=== Sheffield Wednesday ===
On 21 June 2024, Valery returned to England, signing for Sheffield Wednesday for an undisclosed fee. He made his Wednesday debut against Plymouth Argyle on 11 August 2024, starting the game in a 4–0 victory. He scored his first goal for Wednesday away at Middlesbrough on Boxing day, scoring the equalising goal after Wednesday went 3–0 down.

==== Loan to Young Boys ====
On 9 February 2026, Valery joined Swiss Super League side Young Boys on loan for the remainder of the season, without the option to buy.

== International career ==
Valery has represented France at both under-17 and under-18 level. In January 2019, he met with Tunisia manager Alain Giresse and agreed to play for the Tunisia national team.

In September 2022, Valery accepted a call-up to play for Tunisia in friendlies against Comoros and Brazil in preparation for the 2022 FIFA World Cup. He made his debut as a late substitute in the 5–1 loss to Brazil on 27 September. He was called up to the Tunisia squad for the 2025 Africa Cup of Nations held in Morocco.

On 15 May 2026, Valery was named in the Tunisia squad for the 2026 FIFA World Cup.

== Career statistics ==
=== Club ===
As of 20 November 2026

Appearances and goals by club, season and competition
Club	Season	League			National cup (Note: Includes FA Cup, Coupe de France)		League cup (Note: Includes EFL Cup)		Other		Total	
Club	Season	Division	Apps	Goals	Apps	Goals	Apps	Goals	Apps	Goals	Apps	Goals
Southampton U23, U21	2016–17	—	—		—		—		4 (Note: Appearances in EFL Trophy)	0	3	0
Southampton U23, U21	2017–18	—	—		—		—		2	0	2	0
Southampton U23, U21	2018–19	—	—		—		—		3	0	3	0
Southampton U23, U21	2020–21	—	—		—		—		2	0	2	0
Southampton U23, U21	Total		—		—		—		11	0	11	0
Southampton	2018–19	Premier League	23	2	0	0	1	0	—		24	2
Southampton	2019–20	Premier League	11	0	0	0	1	0	—		12	0
Southampton	2020–21	Premier League	3	0	1	0	0	0	—		4	0
Southampton	2021–22	Premier League	5	0	3	0	3	0	—		11	0
Southampton	2022–23	Premier League	1	0	0	0	1	0	—		2	0
Southampton	Total		43	2	4	0	6	0	—		53	2
Birmingham City (loan)	2020–21	Championship	7	0	—		—		—		7	0
Angers	2022–23	Ligue 1	30	0	1	0	—		—		31	0
Angers	2023–24	Ligue 2	35	0	2	0	—		—		37	0
Angers	Total		65	0	3	0	0	0	—		68	0
Sheffield Wednesday	2024–25	Championship	39	3	1	0	0	0	—		40	3
Sheffield Wednesday	2025–26	Championship	23	0	0	0	0	0	—		23	0
Sheffield Wednesday	2026–27	League One	14	1	1	0	1	0	0	0	16	1
Sheffield Wednesday	Total		76	4	2	0	1	0	0	0	79	4
Young Boys (loan)	2025–26	Swiss Super League	14	0	0	0	0	0	—		14	0
Career total			205	6	9	0	7	0	11	0	232	6

=== International ===
As of 24 September 2026

Appearances and goals by national team and year
National team	Year	Apps	Goals
Tunisia	2022	1	0
Tunisia	2023	6	0
Tunisia	2024	1	0
Tunisia	2025	12	0
Tunisia	2026	6	0
Total		26	0
