= Yassin Belkhdim =

Footballer (born 2002)

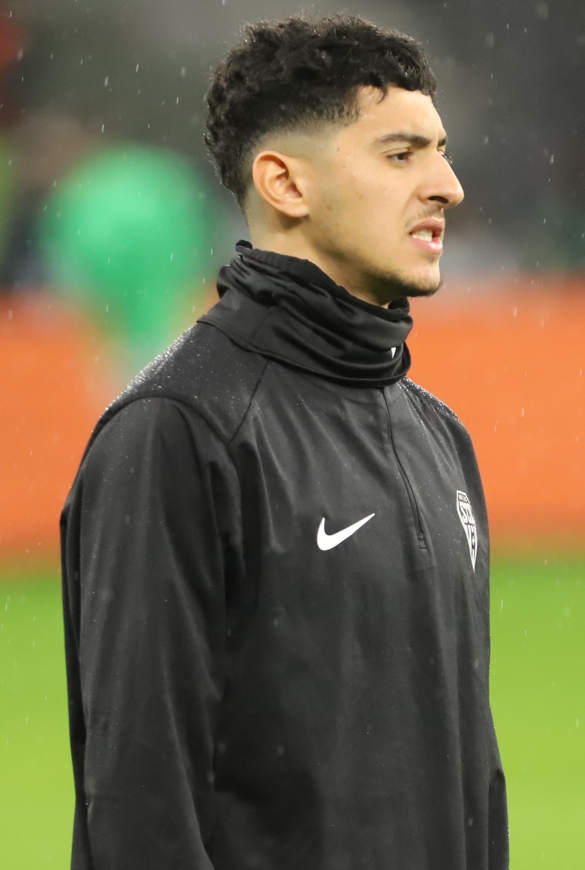
- Belkhdim with Angers in 2025

Personal information
- Date of birth: 14 February 2002 (age 24)
- Place of birth: Meulan, France
- Height: 1.75 m (5 ft 9 in)
- Position: Midfielder

Team information
- Current team: Angers
- Number: 14

Youth career
- Juziers FC
- –2019: FC Mantois

Senior career*
Years	Team	Apps	(Gls)
2019–2020	FC Mantois	11	(1)
2020–	Angers B	57	(4)
2023–	Angers	63	(3)
- * Club domestic league appearances and goals as of 20 May 2026

Yassin Belkhdim (born 14 February 2002) is a professional footballer who plays as a midfielder for Ligue 1 club Angers. Born in France, he represents Morocco at the youth international level.

== Club career ==
Belkhdim, who formerly played for FC Mantois, joined Angers SCO in 2020 after scoring against the club's reserve team in the Championnat National 2. On 13 June 2022, he signed his first professional contract with Angers, a deal extending until 2025. He made his debut for the senior team on 18 November 2023, in a 2–0 away victory over Houilles AC in the seventh round of the Coupe de France. During the second half of the 2023–24 season, his performances led Angers coach Alexandre Dujeux to include him in several Ligue 2 matches.

== International career ==
In November 2021, Belkhdim received his first call-up to the Morocco under-23s.
