= Oussama Falouh =

Moroccan footballer (1999–2023)

Personal information
- Date of birth: 12 July 1999
- Place of birth: Sidi Belyout, Casablanca, Morocco
- Date of death: 2 November 2023 (aged 24)
- Place of death: Casablanca, Morocco
- Height: 1.77 m (5 ft 10 in)
- Position: Left-back

Youth career
- –2018: Mohammed VI Football Academy

Senior career*
Years	Team	Apps	(Gls)
2018–2019	Strasbourg B	12	(0)
2019–2020	FUS Rabat	0	(0)
2020–2021	Angers B	1	(0)
2021–2023	→ Avranches (loan)	22	(0)
2021–2023	→ Avranches B (loan)	2	(0)
2023	Wydad Casablanca	0	(0)
Total		37	(0)
- * Club domestic league appearances and goals

Oussama Falouh (Arabic: أسامة فلوح; 12 July 1999 – 2 November 2023) was a Moroccan footballer who played as a left-back. He played for a number of Moroccan and French clubs, and for the Morocco U23 national team. Falouh died on 2 November 2023 of injuries he sustained in a car crash the previous month.

== Career ==
Born on 12 July 1999, Oussama was a product of the Mohammed VI Football Academy. He joined the B-team of French side RC Strasbourg in 2018. In 2019, he was transferred to Botola side FUS Rabat. He returned to France and joined Angers of Ligue 1 in July 2020, on a three-year deal. He was loaned to Avranches of the third-tier Championnat National in July 2021 and again a year later. In the summer of 2023, Wydad Casablanca signed Falouh.

== Death ==
On 11 October 2023, Falouh was seriously injured in a car crash involving a truck in Casablanca. Falouh, a passenger in the car, suffered multiple brain haemorrhages, a broken neck and thorax, entered a coma and was immediately admitted to intensive care. He would later be transferred to another healthcare facility by the club's officials. In the late hours of 2 November 2023, the club announced Oussama's death from his injuries. He was 24.
