= Noah Nadje =

French footballer (born 2003)

Personal information
- Full name: Guédé Noah Nadje
- Date of birth: 12 November 2003 (age 23)
- Place of birth: Saint-Maurice, France
- Height: 1.84 m (6 ft 0 in)
- Position: Forward

Team information
- Current team: Angers B

Youth career
- –2021: Nantes
- 2021–2022: Angers

Senior career*
| Years | Team | Apps | (Gls) |
| 2021– | Angers B | 39 | (7) |
| 2021–2023 | Angers | 2 | (1) |
| 2024–2025 | → Bourg Péronnas (loan) | 5 | (1) |
- * Club domestic league appearances and goals as of 1 November 2025

Guédé Noah Nadje (born 12 November 2003) is a French professional footballer who plays as a forward for Angers B.

== Career ==
Nadje made his professional debut for Angers on the 26 January 2022, replacing Angelo Fulgini during a 1–0 away Ligue 1 loss against Saint-Etienne.

== Personal life ==
Born in France, Nadje is of Ivorian descent and has dual nationality.
