= Farid El Melali =

Algerian footballer (born 1997)

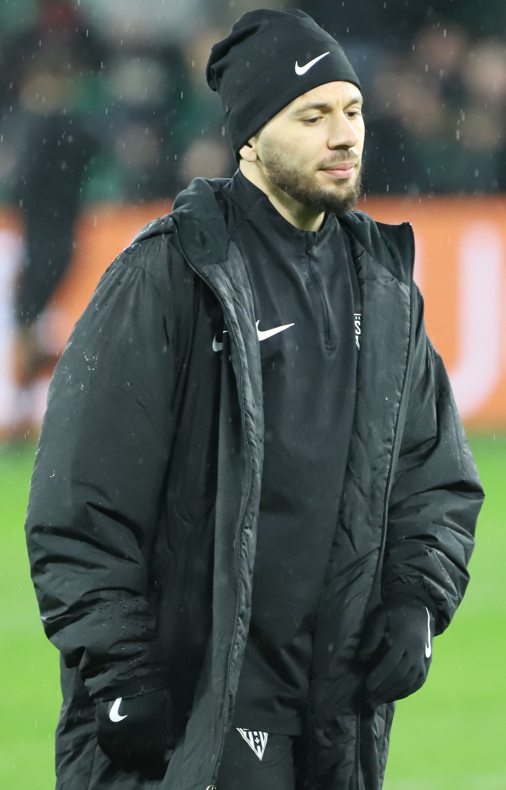
- El Melali with Angers in 2025

Personal information
- Date of birth: 5 May 1997 (age 29)
- Place of birth: Blida, Algeria
- Height: 1.68 m (5 ft 6 in)
- Position: Forward

Team information
- Current team: CR Belouizdad
- Number: 10

Youth career
- 2013–2016: Paradou AC

Senior career*
Years	Team	Apps	(Gls)
2016–2018	Paradou AC	45	(8)
2018–2025	Angers	127	(13)
2018–2022	Angers II	8	(2)
2022	→ Pau (loan)	17	(1)
2025–	CR Belouizdad	15	(1)

International career
2015–2016	Algeria U20	6	(4)
2017–2018	Algeria U23	9	(2)
2017–2018	Algeria	3	(0)
- * Club domestic league appearances and goals as of 5 June 2026

Farid El Melali (Arabic: فَرِيْد الْمَلَالِيّ; born 5 May 1997) is an Algerian professional footballer who plays as a forward for CR Belouizdad.

Formed at Paradou AC, he signed for Angers in 2018 where he played in Ligue 1 and Ligue 2, also being loaned to Pau in the latter part of 2022, and recently (2025) he signed for the Algerian club MC Alger

El Melali played three games for Algeria in 2017 and 2018.

== Club career ==
Born in Blida, El Melali began his career with Paradou AC. On 9 August 2018, he signed a four-year deal with French Ligue 1 side Angers SCO, having previously been close to a move to RC Lens and Algiers duo USM Alger and MC Alger. Only used as a substitute in his first season, he scored his first goal for the club on 24 August 2019 in the fourth minute of a 3–0 home win over FC Metz, and followed it a week later with another goal in a 2–0 victory against Dijon FCO also at the Stade Raymond Kopa; the following 19 January he netted twice in the first half of a 4–1 win at FC Rouen in the last 32 of the Coupe de France.

In May 2020, El Melali signed an extension until 2023. He netted just once in 17 games in 2020–21, when again he was mainly a substitute; this goal came in a 3–0 home win over Dijon on 9 May 2021.

On 7 January 2022, El Melali joined Pau FC of Ligue 2 for the second half of the 2021–22 season. He scored once in 17 games, equalising in a 2–1 comeback win at home to Amiens SC on 5 March.

In June 2023, with Angers now relegated to Ligue 2, El Melali signed a new two-year contract.

And now he joined MC Alger in the last hours of the 2025 summer mercato window, he signed a 5 years deal with the dean.

== International career ==
El Melali made his debut for Algeria on 18 August 2017 in a 1–1 draw with Libya in 2018 African Nations Championship qualification, as a 75th-minute substitute for Mohamed Madani.

== Personal life ==
In May 2020, El Melali was seen masturbating in the courtyard of his block of flats while looking at a woman who lived on the ground floor. He was arrested and charged by French police with public masturbation. He later apologized for his behavior, as he wrote: "In the past few days, I've lived through very hard and stressful period, whether mentally or physically, I've been criticized and toughly judged. I understand how hard it was for the people who have received the news, because no one can forgive this kind of behavior".

In July 2020, El Melali was arrested for the same offence, the second in three months. In October, he was given a six-month prison sentence suspended for 18 months, fined €2,000 and made to pay compensation of €1,600 and €2,300 to two victims.
