= Marius Courcoul =

French footballer (born 2007)

Personal information
- Date of birth: 1 January 2007 (age 19)
- Place of birth: Château-Gontier, France
- Height: 1.82 m (6 ft 0 in)
- Position: Defensive midfielder

Team information
- Current team: La Louvière (on loan from Angers)
- Number: 29

Youth career
- 2012–2018: FC Château-Gontier
- 2018–2020: Laval
- 2020–2023: Angers

Senior career*
Years	Team	Apps	(Gls)
2023–	Angers B	12	(0)
2023–	Angers	27	(0)
2026–	→ La Louvière (loan)	0	(0)

International career^{‡}
2022–2023	France U16	10	(2)
2023	France U17	3	(0)
2024–2025	France U18	10	(0)
2025–	France U19	10	(0)
- * Club domestic league appearances and goals as of 20 May 2026 ‡ National team caps and goals as of 31 March 2026

Marius Courcoul (born 1 January 2007) is a French professional footballer who plays as a defensive midfielder for Belgian Pro League club La Louvière on loan from Ligue 1 club Angers.

== Club career ==
Originally a youth player at his hometown club FC Château-Gontier, Courcoul joined the Laval academy in 2018. In 2020, he joined Angers, where he would eventually sign his first professional contract in June 2023, a three-year deal until June 2026. On 5 August 2023, Courcoul made his professional debut in a 1–0 defeat away to Laval at the age of 16 years and 216 days.

On 14 August 2026, Courcoul was loaned by La Louvière in Belgium, with an option to buy.

== International career ==
Courcoul is a France youth international. At the Montaigu Tournament with the France under-16s in April 2023, he was his team's captain and was chosen as the tournament's best player.

== Honours ==
Individual

- Montaigu Tournament Best Player: 2023
