= Zinédine Ould Khaled =

French footballer (born 2000)

Personal information
- Full name: Zinédine Ould Khaled
- Date of birth: 14 January 2000 (age 26)
- Place of birth: Alfortville, France
- Height: 1.95 m (6 ft 5 in)
- Position: Midfielder

Team information
- Current team: Sabah
- Number: 22

Youth career
- 2008–2012: Alfortville
- 2012–2013: Maccabi Paris
- 2013: Gobelins
- 2013–2014: Maccabi Paris
- 2014: Ivry
- 2014–2015: Paris Valenton
- 2015–2016: Maccabi Paris
- 2016–2017: Racing Colombes
- 2017–2018: Angers

Senior career*
Years	Team	Apps	(Gls)
2018–2025	Angers II	42	(3)
2020–2025	Angers	42	(1)
2025–	Sabah	10	(0)
- * Club domestic league appearances and goals as of 22 June 2026

Zinédine Ould Khaled (born 14 January 2000) is a French professional footballer who plays as a midfielder for Azerbaijan Premier League club Sabah.

== Club career ==
Ould Khaled made his professional debut with Angers in a 2–0 Ligue 1 win over Nantes on 7 March 2020.

== Personal life ==
Born in France, Ould Khaled is of Algerian descent. He was named after the French footballer Zinedine Zidane.

== Honours ==
Sabah

- Azerbaijan Premier League: 2025–26
- Azerbaijan Cup: 2025–26
