= Amine Salama =

French footballer (born 2000)

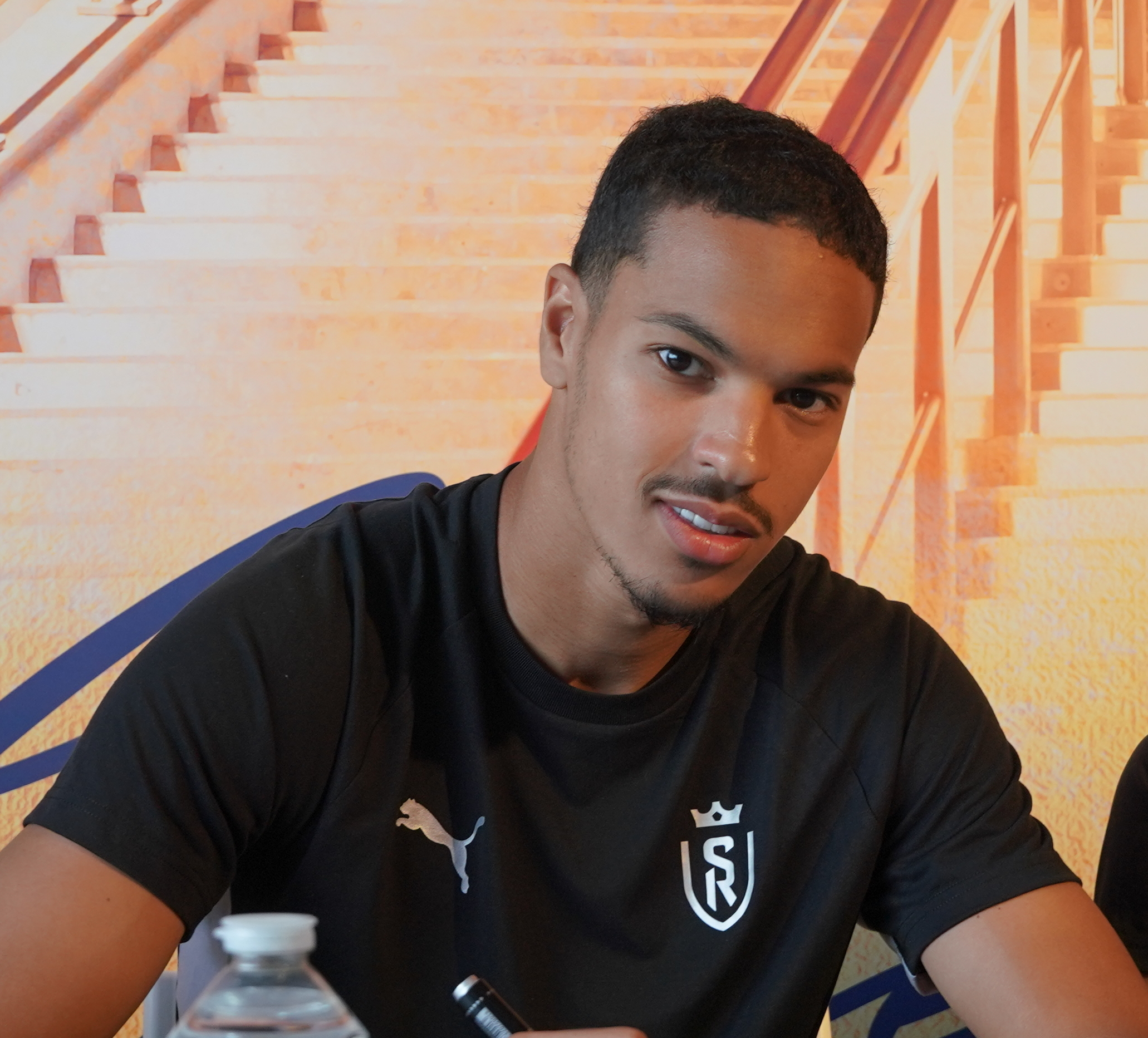

Personal information
- Date of birth: 18 July 2000 (age 26)
- Place of birth: Paris, France
- Height: 1.92 m (6 ft 4 in)
- Position: Forward

Team information
- Current team: Reims

Youth career
- CA Paris
- 2011–2022: Montrouge

Senior career*
Years	Team	Apps	(Gls)
2022	Dunkerque	11	(0)
2022–2023	Angers	25	(3)
2023–	Reims	41	(2)
2023	Reims II	2	(1)
2024	→ Caen (loan)	15	(1)
2025	→ Torino (loan)	0	(0)
2026	→ NAC Breda (loan)	8	(0)
- * Club domestic league appearances and goals as of 21 May 2026

Amine Salama (born 18 July 2000) is a French professional footballer who plays as a forward for Ligue 2 club Reims.

== Club career ==
A youth product of Montrouge, Salama began his senior career with Dunkerque in 2022. He made his professional debut with Dunkerque in a 1–1 Ligue 2 tie with Paris FC on 28 January 2022.

In June 2022, Salama signed a four-year contract with Angers.

On 31 January 2024, Salama was loaned by Caen.

On 3 February 2025, he moved on loan to Italian club Torino, with an option to buy. He never appeared for Torino during the loan, mostly dealing with a hamstring injury.

On 2 February 2026, he joined NAC Breda, penultimate in the Eredivisie, in the form of a loan with an option to buy.

== Personal life ==
Amine Salama was born in Paris, France. He holds French and Moroccan nationalities.

== Honours ==
Reims

- Coupe de France runner-up: 2024–25
