= Batista Mendy =

French footballer (born 2000)

Personal information
- Full name: Batista Adélino Mendy
- Date of birth: 12 January 2000 (age 26)
- Place of birth: Saint-Nazaire, France
- Height: 1.91 m (6 ft 3 in)
- Position: Defensive midfielder

Team information
- Current team: Trabzonspor
- Number: 3

Youth career
- 2007–2015: Saint-Nazaire
- 2015–2019: Nantes

Senior career*
| Years | Team | Apps | (Gls) |
| 2018–2021 | Nantes II | 43 | (0) |
| 2020–2021 | Nantes | 2 | (0) |
| 2021–2023 | Angers | 69 | (1) |
| 2023– | Trabzonspor | 65 | (2) |
| 2025–2026 | → Sevilla (loan) | 27 | (1) |

International career
| 2015–2016 | France U16 | 10 | (0) |
| 2016–2017 | France U17 | 7 | (0) |
| 2017 | France U18 | 3 | (0) |
| 2018–2019 | France U19 | 4 | (1) |
- * Club domestic league appearances and goals as of 27 May 2026

Batista Adélino Mendy (born 12 January 2000) is a French professional footballer who plays as a defensive midfielder for Süper Lig club Trabzonspor.

== Club career ==
=== Nantes ===
Having come through the youth ranks at Nantes, Mendy made his professional debut for the club on 13 September 2020, in a 2–1 loss to Monaco.

=== Angers ===
On 27 July 2021, Mendy joined Ligue 1 side Angers for an undisclosed fee, signing a three-year contract.

=== Trabzonspor ===
On 8 September 2023, Mendy joined Turkish side Trabzonspor for an estimated €5 million fee.

==== Loan to Sevilla ====
On 1 September 2025, La Liga club Sevilla announced the signing of Mendy on a one-year loan deal with a buyout clause.

== International career ==
Born in France, Mendy is of Bissau-Guinean descent. He is a youth international for France.
