= Jason Mbock =

French footballer (born 1999)

Personal information
- Full name: Jason Lazare Mbock
- Date of birth: 1 November 1999 (age 27)
- Place of birth: Créteil, France
- Height: 1.77 m (5 ft 10 in)
- Position: Winger

Team information
- Current team: Créteil
- Number: 28

Youth career
- 2009–2014: Creteil
- 2012–2014: INF Clairefontaine
- 2015–2017: Monaco

Senior career*
Years	Team	Apps	(Gls)
2017–2019	Monaco II	33	(6)
2019–2023	Angers II	50	(11)
2020–2023	Angers	3	(0)
2020–2021	→ Neuchâtel Xamax (loan)	22	(1)
2023–2024	Creteil	8	(2)
2024–2026	Rouen	34	(3)
2026–	Créteil	2	(0)
- * Club domestic league appearances and goals as of 29 August 2026

Jason Lazare Mbock (born 1 November 1999) is a French professional footballer who plays as a winger for Championnat National 1 club Créteil.

== Career ==
Mbock is a youth product of Creteil, INF Clairefontaine, and Monaco. He began his senior career with the reserves of Monaco in 2017, before moving to the reserves of Angers in 2019. He signed his first professional contract with Angers on 14 August 2020. He went on loan to the Swiss Challenge League club Neuchâtel Xamax for the 2020–21 season. He made his professional debut with Angers in a 1–0 Ligue 1 loss to Saint-Étienne on 26 January 2022.

== Personal life ==
Born in France, Mbock is of Cameroonian descent.
