= Lilian Raolisoa =

French footballer (born 2000)

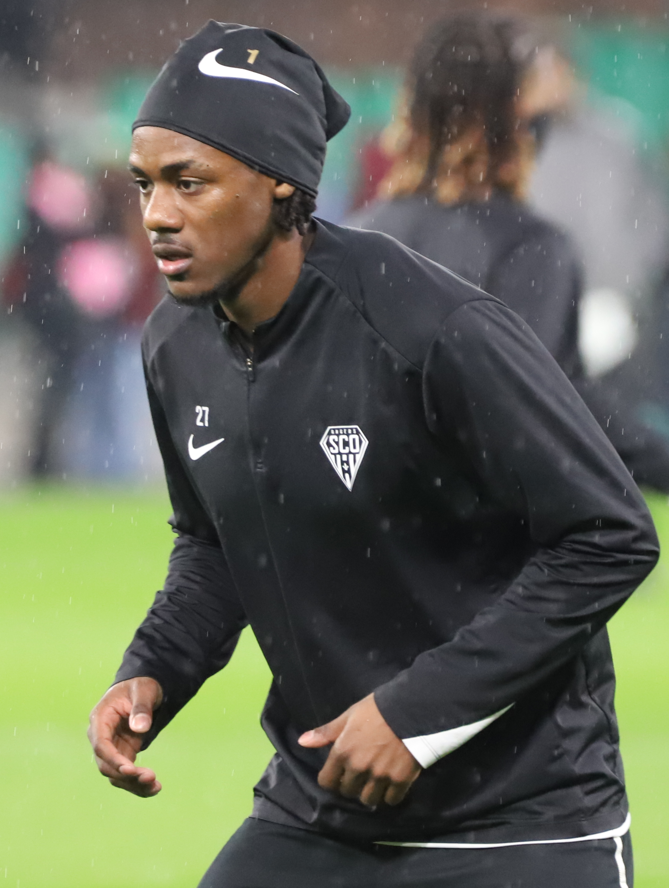
- Raolisoa with Angers in 2025

Personal information
- Date of birth: 16 June 2000 (age 26)
- Place of birth: Angers, France
- Height: 1.78 m (5 ft 10 in)
- Position: Right-back

Team information
- Current team: Angers
- Number: 27

Youth career
- 2007–2011: A. A. Grisolles
- 2011–2013: Toulouse
- 2013–2017: Muret
- 2017–2022: Angers

Senior career*
Years	Team	Apps	(Gls)
2018–2023	Angers II	54	(1)
2023–	Angers	104	(4)
- * Club domestic league appearances and goals as of 20 May 2026

Lilian Raolisoa (born 16 June 2000) is a French professional footballer who plays as a right-back for Ligue 1 club Angers.

== Early life ==
Raolisoa is of Martiniquais and Malagasy descent and was born in Angers, and moved with his family to Toulouse at the age of two. He began playing football at the age of 7 with A. A. Grisolles, before moving to Toulouse FC in 2011. He a stint with AS Muret. In 2017 he joined the youth academy of Angers.

== Career ==
In 2018, Raolisa was promoted to Angers's reserves. In January 2023, he started training with their senior squad. He made his professional debut with Angers as a substitute in a 2–1 Ligue 1 loss to Clermont Foot on 15 January 2023.
