= Alexandre Dujeux =

French footballer (born 1976)

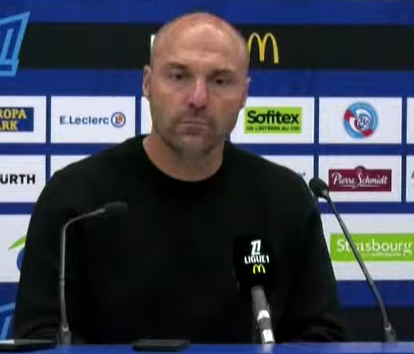
- Dujeux in 2025

Personal information
- Date of birth: 8 January 1976 (age 50)
- Place of birth: Villers-Semeuse, Ardennes, France
- Height: 1.81 m (5 ft 11 in)
- Position: Defender

Team information
- Current team: Lorient (manager)

Senior career*
Years	Team	Apps	(Gls)
1993–1999	Auxerre	0	(0)
1997–1998	→ Red Star (loan)	38	(2)
1999–2003	Châteauroux	143	(9)
2003–2005	Le Havre	36	(1)
2005–2006	Troyes	36	(0)
2006–2008	Ajaccio	65	(0)
2008–2010	Tours	50	(0)
Total		368	(12)

Managerial career
- 2014–2015: Tours (interim)
- 2023–2026: Angers
- 2026–: Lorient
- * Club domestic league appearances and goals

Alexandre Dujeux (French pronunciation: [alɛksɑ̃dʁ dyʒø]; born 8 January 1976) is a French professional football coach and a former defender. He is currently the manager of Ligue 1 club Lorient.

== Managerial statistics ==
As of match played 22 November 2026

Managerial record by team and tenure
Team	From	To	Record				
Team	From	To	G	W	D	L	Win %
Angers	7 March 2023	3 June 2026	127	46	27	54	36.22
Lorient	9 June 2026	present	11	4	4	3	36.36
Total			138	50	31	57	36.23
