= Stade Raymond Kopa =

Football stadium in Angers, France

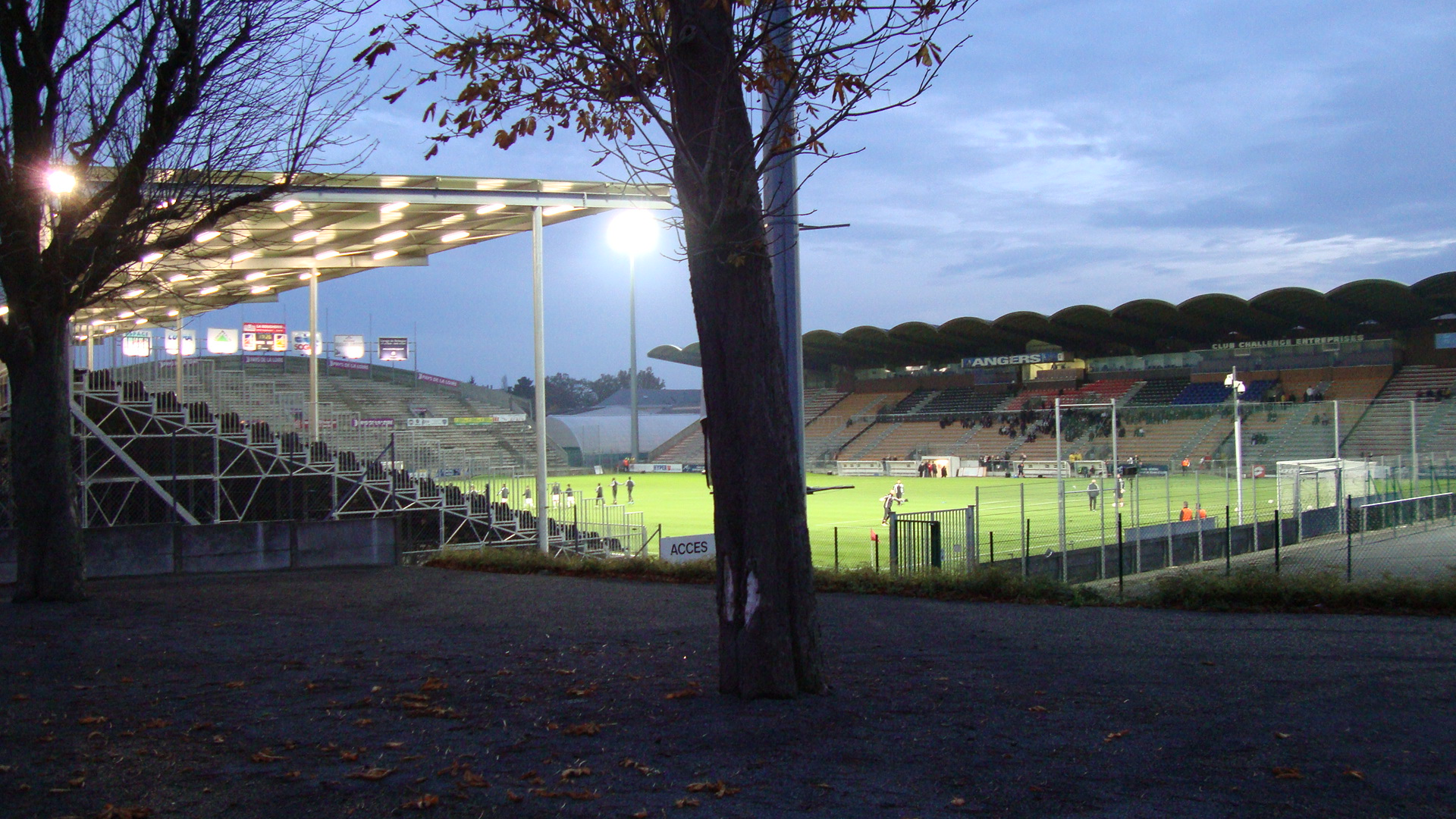
- Interactive map of Stade Raymond Kopa
- Former names: Stade Bessonneau (1912–1957); Stade Municipal (1957–1968); Stade Jean-Bouin (1968–2017)
- Location: 11, boulevard Pierre-de-Coubertin 49000 Angers, Maine-et-Loire, France
- Coordinates: 47.4605°N 0.5307°W
- Owner: City of Angers
- Operator: Angers SCO
- Capacity: 19,800
- Surface: AirFibr hybrid grass
- Record attendance: 22,989 (Angers SCO vs Olympique de Marseille, 26 April 1969)
- Field size: 105 × 68 metres (344 ft × 223 ft)

Construction
- Opened: 1912
- Renovated: 1957, 1993, 2011, 2018–2023
- Architect: Studio d'architecture Bruno Huet (renovation)

Tenant
- Angers SCO (1919–present)

The Stade Raymond Kopa is a football stadium in Angers, France. It is the home ground of Ligue 1 side Angers SCO and seats 19,800 people.

== Name ==
The stadium is named after Raymond Kopa, who, after playing for Angers from 1949 to 1951, became one of the most prominent players of his era. It was previously named Stade Bessonneau from 1912 to 1957, Stade Municipal from 1957 to 1968, and Stade Jean-Bouin from 1968 to 2017.

== See also ==
- List of football stadiums in France
- Lists of stadiums
