= 2015–16 Angers SCO season =

Angers
2015–16 season
- Chairman: Saïd Chabane
- Manager: Stéphane Moulin
- Stadium: Stade Jean-Bouin
- Ligue 1: 8th
- Coupe de France: Round of 32
- Coupe de la Ligue: Round of 32
- Top goalscorer: League: Cheikh N'Doye (9); All: Cheikh N'Doye (10)
- Highest home attendance: 16,381 vs Paris Saint-Germain (1 December 2015)
- Lowest home attendance: 4,484 vs Bordeaux (19 January 2015)
Home colours	Away colours

The 2015–16 Angers SCO season is the 97th professional season of the club since its creation in 1919. Angers return to Ligue 1 after finishing third in Ligue 2 last season.

== Players ==
French teams are limited to four players without EU citizenship. Hence, the squad list includes only the principal nationality of each player; several non-European players on the squad have dual citizenship with an EU country. Also, players from the ACP countries—countries in Africa, the Caribbean, and the Pacific that are signatories to the Cotonou Agreement—are not counted against non-EU quotas due to the Kolpak ruling.

=== Current squad ===
Updated 2 February 2016.

Note: Flags indicate national team as defined under FIFA eligibility rules; some limited exceptions apply. Players may hold more than one non-FIFA nationality.

No.	Pos.	Nation	Player
1	GK	SRB	Denis Petrić
2	DF	FRA	Gaël Angoula
3	DF	CGO	Arnold Bouka Moutou
5	MF	FRA	Thomas Mangani
6	DF	FRA	Grégory Bourillon
7	MF	FRA	Olivier Auriac (captain)
8	DF	CIV	Ismaël Traoré
9	FW	GUI	Mohamed Yattara (on loan from Standard Liège)
10	FW	FRA	Gilles Sunu
11	FW	FRA	Slimane Sissoko
12	FW	CMR	Jean-Pierre Nsamé
14	FW	FRA	Billy Ketkeophomphone
15	MF	FRA	Pierrick Capelle
17	MF	SEN	Cheikh N'Doye

No.	Pos.	Nation	Player
18	DF	GUI	Ibrahima Diallo
19	MF	FRA	Mathias Serin
20	MF	FRA	Charles Diers
21	DF	FRA	Yoann Andreu
22	FW	SUI	Goran Karanović
23	MF	FRA	Yohann Eudeline
24	DF	FRA	Romain Thomas
25	MF	ALG	Saïd Benrahma (on loan from Nice)
26	MF	CMR	Guy Ngosso
27	FW	CGO	Férébory Doré
28	MF	MAR	Romain Saïss
29	MF	FRA	Vincent Manceau
30	GK	FRA	Alexandre Letellier
40	GK	FRA	Mattéo Petitgenet

=== Out on loan ===
Note: Flags indicate national team as defined under FIFA eligibility rules; some limited exceptions apply. Players may hold more than one non-FIFA nationality.

No.	Pos.	Nation	Player
—	DF	ALG	Antar Yahia (on loan to Orléans)
—	DF	MLI	Kalifa Traoré (on loan to Les Herbiers)
—	MF	ARG	Diego Gómez (on loan to Boulogne)

No.	Pos.	Nation	Player
—	MF	BRA	Pessalli (on loan to Luçon)
—	FW	FRA	Ludovic Ajorque (on loan to Luçon)
—	FW	FRA	Nicolas Pépé (on loan to Orléans)

== Squad statistics ==
As of match played 5 March 2016

No.	Pos.	Nat.	Name	Aps	Gls	Ast	Yellow card	Red card
Goalkeepers
1	GK	(Serbia)	Denis Petrić	3	0	0	0	0
30	GK	(France)	Alexandre Letellier	10	0	0	0	0
40	GK	(France)	Mattéo Petitgenet	0	0	0	0	0
—	GK	(France)	Ludovic Butelle	19	0	0	0	0
Defenders
2	DF	(France)	Gaël Angoula	11	0	0	1	0
3	DF	(Republic of the Congo)	Arnold Bouka Moutou	16	2	0	2	0
6	DF	(France)	Grégory Bourillon	3	0	0	0	0
8	DF	(Ivory Coast)	Ismaël Traoré	29	2	0	0	0
18	DF	(Guinea)	Ibrahima Diallo	0	0	0	0	0
21	DF	(France)	Yoann Andreu	27	0	1	5	0
24	DF	(France)	Romain Thomas	31	2	0	6	0
Midfielders
5	MF	(France)	Thomas Mangani	26	3	4	3	1
7	MF	(France)	Olivier Auriac	15	0	0	2	0
15	MF	(France)	Pierrick Capelle	22	4	0	2	1
17	MF	(Senegal)	Cheikh N'Doye	26	8	2	5	2
19	MF	(France)	Mathias Serin	3	0	0	0	0
20	MF	(France)	Charles Diers	12	1	0	0	0
23	MF	(France)	Yohann Eudeline	0	0	0	0	0
25	MF	(Algeria)	Saïd Benrahma	7	0	0	0	0
26	MF	(Cameroon)	Guy Ngosso	5	0	0	0	0
28	MF	(Morocco)	Romain Saïss	29	1	1	13	0
29	MF	(France)	Vincent Manceau	26	0	1	2	0
—	MF	(Argentina)	Diego Gómez	2	0	0	0	0
—	MF	(Guinea)	Abdoul Camara	17	2	0	4	0
Forwards
9	FW	(Guinea)	Mohamed Yattara	11	1	1	1	0
10	FW	(France)	Gilles Sunu	26	2	1	4	0
11	FW	(France)	Slimane Sissoko	12	0	1	1	1
12	FW	(Cameroon)	Jean-Pierre Nsamé	7	0	0	0	0
14	FW	(France)	Billy Ketkeophomphone	29	4	4	4	0
22	FW	(Switzerland)	Goran Karanović	13	1	0	0	0
27	FW	(Republic of the Congo)	Férébory Doré	9	0	0	2	0

== Transfers ==
=== In ===
Date	Pos.	Player	Age	Moved from	Fee	Notes
1 July 2015	DF	(Ivory Coast) Ismaël Traoré	28	(France) Brest	Free Transfer	
1 July 2015	MF	(France) Mathias Serin	23	(France) Romorantin	Free Transfer	
1 July 2015	MF	(Senegal) Cheikh N'Doye	29	(France) Créteil	Free Transfer	
1 July 2015	FW	(France) Billy Ketkeophomphone	25	(France) Tours	Free Transfer	
1 July 2015	MF	(France) Pierrick Capelle	28	(France) Clermont	Free Transfer	
1 July 2015	DF	(France) Yoann Andreu	26	(France) Gazélec Ajaccio	Free Transfer	
1 July 2015	FW	(France) Gilles Sunu	24	(France) Evian	Undisclosed	
1 July 2015	FW	(France) Slimane Sissoko	24	(France) Vendée Luçon	Undisclosed	
3 July 2015	DF	(Morocco) Romain Saïss	25	(France) Le Havre	Free Transfer	
4 July 2015	MF	(France) Thomas Mangani	28	(Italy) Chievo	Undisclosed	
1 August 2015	MF	(Tunisia) Bilel Mohsni	28	(Scotland) Rangers	Free Transfer	
1 August 2015	FW	(Switzerland) Goran Karanović	27	(Switzerland) St. Gallen	Free Transfer	
3 August 2015	FW	(Republic of the Congo) Férébory Doré	26	(Bulgaria) Botev Plovdiv	Free Transfer	
3 August 2015	FW	(Republic of the Congo) Férébory Doré	26	(Bulgaria) Botev Plovdiv	Free Transfer	
4 January 2016	GK	(Slovenia) Denis Petrić	27	(France) Troyes	Free Transfer	
4 January 2016	FW	(Guinea) Mohamed Yattara	22	(Belgium) Standard Liège	Loan	
8 January 2016	FW	(Algeria) Saïd Benrahma	20	(France) Nice	Loan	
25 January 2016	DF	(France) Grégory Bourillon	31	(France) Reims	Loan	

=== Out ===
Date	Pos.	Player	Age	Moved to	Fee	Notes
1 July 2015	FW	(France) Jérémy Blayac	32	(France) Strasbourg	Free Transfer	
1 July 2015	MF	(Morocco) Rayan Frikeche	23	(France) AC Ajaccio	Free Transfer	
1 July 2015	FW	(France) Sacha Clémence	27	(France) Créteil	Undisclosed	
1 July 2015	FW	(Argentina) Diego Gómez	31	Released		
1 July 2015	MF	(Morocco) Hamza Hafidi	22	Released		
7 July 2015	DF	(France) Fabien Boyer	24	(Belgium) Kortrijk	Undisclosed	
7 July 2015	DF	(France) Loïc Guillon	33	(France) Vendée Luçon	Free Transfer	
18 July 2015	FW	(Tunisia) Khaled Ayari	25	(France) Paris FC	Free Transfer	
20 July 2015	FW	(France) Jonathan Kodjia	25	(England) Bristol City	~£2 million	
29 December 2015	GK	(France) Ludovic Butelle	32	(Belgium) Club Brugge	Undisclosed	
4 January 2016	FW	(Guinea) Abdoul Camara	25	(England) Derby County	~£1.25 million	
12 January 2016	MF	(Mali) Ismaël Keïta	25	(France) Paris FC	Undisclosed	
18 January 2016	DF	(Tunisia) Bilel Mohsni	34	(France) Paris FC	Undisclosed	

=== Out on loan ===
Date	Pos.	Player	Age	Loaned to	Return date	Notes
2 July 2015	FW	(France) Nicolas Pépé	20	(France) Orléans	30 June 2016	
5 July 2015	FW	(France) Ludovic Ajorque	21	(France) Vendée Luçon	30 June 2016	
29 December 2015	DF	(Algeria) Antar Yahia	33	(France) Orléans	30 June 2016	
28 January 2016	FW	(Argentina) Diego Gómez	32	(France) Boulogne	30 June 2016	
1 February 2016	DF	(Mali) Kalifa Traoré	24	(France) Les Herbiers	30 June 2016	
2 February 2016	MF	(Brazil) Pessalli	25	(France) Vendée Luçon	30 June 2016	

== Competitions ==
=== Ligue 1 ===
==== League table ====
Pos	Team	Pld	W	D	L	GF	GA	GD	Pts
7	Caen	38	16	6	16	39	52	−13	54
8	Rennes	38	13	13	12	52	54	−2	52
9	Angers	38	13	11	14	40	38	+2	50
10	Bastia	38	14	8	16	36	42	−6	50
11	Bordeaux	38	12	14	12	50	57	−7	50

Source: Ligue 1, Soccerway
Rules for classification: 1) Points; 2) Goal difference; 3) Goals scored; 4) Head-to-head points; 5) Head-to-head goal difference; 6) Fairplay ranking.

==== Results summary ====
Overall								Home						Away					
Pld	W	D	L	GF	GA	GD	Pts	W	D	L	GF	GA	GD	W	D	L	GF	GA	GD
38	13	11	14	40	38	+2	50	6	8	5	20	15	+5	7	3	9	20	23	−3

Last updated: 9 May 2016.
Source: Competitive matches

==== Results by round ====
Round	1	2	3	4	5	6	7	8	9	10	11	12	13	14	15	16	17	18	19	20	21	22	23	24	25	26	27	28	29	30	31	32	33	34	35	36	37	38
Ground	A	H	A	A	A	H	H	A	H	A	H	A	H	A	H	H	A	H	A	H	A	A	H	A	H	A	H	A	H	A	H	A	H	A	A	H	A	H
Result	W	D	W	D	L	W	D	W	W	W	D	L	L	D	W	D	W	D	L	W	L	L	W	L	L	L	L	D	D	L	W	W	D	W	D	L	L	L
Position	1	4	3	4	7	6	6	5	2	2	2	3	4	5	3	3	2	2	3	2	3	5	3	4	5	8	9	9	9	11	10	9	8	8	8	8	9	9

Source: Ligue1
A = Away; H = Home; W = Win; D = Draw; L = Loss

==== Matches ====
Win Draw Loss

8 August 2015 1	Montpellier	0–2	Angers	Montpellier
21:00 CEST (UTC+02:00)	Deplagne (yellow card) 27'; Bensebaini (yellow card) 61'; Dabo (yellow card) 81'	Report	Camara 4'; N'Doye (yellow card) 8'; Manceau (yellow card) 74'; Sunu 79'	Stadium: Stade de la Mosson; Attendance: 11,789; Referee: Hakim Ben El Hadj

15 August 2015 2	Angers	0–0	Nantes	Angers
20:00 CEST (UTC+02:00)	Mangani (yellow card) 34'; Ketkeophomphone (yellow card) 42'; Saïss (yellow card) 54'	Report	Adryan (yellow card) 23'; Rongier (yellow card) 28'; Touré (yellow card) 32'; Thomasson (yellow card) 63'	Stadium: Stade Jean-Bouin; Attendance: 15,969; Referee: Amaury Delerue

22 August 2015 3	Gazélec Ajaccio	0–2	Angers	Ajaccio, Corsica
20:00 CEST (UTC+02:00)	Lemoigne (yellow card) 14'; Coeff (yellow card) 90+3'	Report	N'Doye 2', 20'; Andreu (yellow card) 31'; Thomas (yellow card) 73'	Stadium: Stade Ange Casanova; Attendance: 3,911; Referee: Bartolomeu Varela

29 August 2015 4	Angers	1–1	Nice	Angers
20:00 CEST (UTC+02:00)	Mangani 24'; Andreu (yellow card) 55'; Doré (yellow card) 87'	Report	Germain (yellow card) 22', (goal) 56'; Boscagli (yellow card) 40'	Stadium: Stade Jean-Bouin; Attendance: 13,485; Referee: Stéphane Jochem

12 September 2015 5	Lorient	3–1	Angers	Lorient
20:00 CEST (UTC+02:00)	Jouffre 46'; N'Dong (yellow card) 68'; Waris 72'; Jeannot 90+3'	Report	Saïss 33'; Camara (yellow card) 66'	Stadium: Stade du Moustoir; Attendance: 9,874; Referee: Jérôme Miguelgorry

19 September 2015 6	Angers	1–0	Troyes	Angers
20:00 CEST (UTC+02:00)	Saïss (yellow card) 23'; N'Doye (red card) 33'; Mangani 57' (pen.); Camara (yellow card) 74'	Report	Karaboué (yellow card) 57'; Pi (yellow card) 60'; Jean (yellow card) 85'	Stadium: Stade Jean-Bouin; Attendance: 10,166; Referee: Lionel Jaffredo

22 September 2015 7	Angers	0–0	Reims	Angers
19:00 CEST (UTC+02:00)	Saïss (yellow card) 6'	Report	Charbonnier (yellow card) 12'; Traore (yellow card) 51'; Kankava (yellow card) 71'	Stadium: Stade Jean-Bouin; Attendance: 11,163; Referee: Tony Chapron

27 September 2015 8	Marseille	1–2	Angers	Marseille
14:00 CEST (UTC+02:00)	Cabella (yellow card) 37'; Nkoulou (yellow card) 69'; Barrada (yellow card) 73'; Batshuayi 79' (pen.)	Report	Saïss (yellow card) 26'; Mangani 38' (pen.); Ketkeophomphone (yellow card) 59'; Thomas 70'; Doré (yellow card) 78'	Stadium: Stade Vélodrome; Attendance: 22,596; Referee: Mikael Lesage

3 October 2015 9	Angers	1–0	Bastia	Angers
20:00 CEST (UTC+02:00)	Ketkeophomphone 41'; Thomas (yellow card) 71'	Report	Mostefa (yellow card) 43'; Diallo (yellow card) 87'	Stadium: Stade Jean-Bouin; Attendance: 11,445; Referee: Sébastien Moreira

17 October 2015 10	Toulouse	1–2	Angers	Toulouse
20:00 CEST (UTC+02:00)	Trejo 24'; Tisserand (yellow card) 84'	Report	N'Doye 27'; Camara 34'; Sissoko (yellow card) 83'	Stadium: Stadium Municipal; Attendance: 13,887; Referee: Amaury Delerue

24 October 2015 11	Angers	0–0	Guingamp	Angers
20:00 CEST (UTC+02:00)	Thomas (yellow card) 42'; Sissoko (red card) 81'; Mangani (yellow card) 83'	Report	Diallo (yellow card) 38'; Angoua (yellow card) 58'	Stadium: Stade Jean-Bouin; Attendance: 14,419; Referee: Antony Gautier

1 November 2015 12	Monaco	1–0	Angers	Monaco
17:00 CET (UTC+01:00)	Traoré (yellow card) 26'; Pašalić 35'; Echiéjilé (yellow card) 40'	Report	Camara (yellow card) 45+1'; N'Doye (yellow card) 59'; Andreu (yellow card) 63'; Thomas (yellow card) 75'	Stadium: Stade Louis II; Attendance: 6,075; Referee: Bartolomeu Varela

6 November 2015 13	Angers	0–2	Rennes	Angers
20:30 CET (UTC+01:00)	Andreu (yellow card) 90+3'	Report	Doucouré 4'; Fernandes (yellow card) 54', (goal) 61'; Grosicki (yellow card) 86'	Stadium: Stade Jean-Bouin; Attendance: 15,202; Referee: Clément Turpin

22 November 2015 14	Caen	0–0	Angers	Caen
14:00 CET (UTC+01:00)	Yahia (red card) 32'; Féret (yellow card) 33'	Report	Capelle (yellow card) 85'	Stadium: Stade Michel d'Ornano; Attendance: 18,101; Referee: Frank Schneider

28 November 2015 15	Angers	2–0	Lille	Angers
20:00 CET (UTC+01:00)	Sunu 20'; Traoré 25'; Camara (yellow card) 60'; Auriac (yellow card) 78'	Report	Corchia (yellow card) 19'; Nangis (yellow card) 27'; Balmont (yellow card) 49'; Civelli (red card) 68'	Stadium: Stade Jean-Bouin; Attendance: 12,000; Referee: Johan Hamel

1 December 2015 16	Angers	0–0	Paris Saint-Germain	Angers
19:00 CET (UTC+01:00)		Report	Aurier (yellow card) 23'	Stadium: Stade Jean-Bouin; Attendance: 16,381; Referee: Benoît Bastien

5 December 2015 17	Lyon	0–2	Angers	Lyon
17:00 CEST (UTC+02:00)	Tolisso (yellow card) 32'; Valbuena (yellow card) 73'; Darder (yellow card) 84'	Report	N'Doye 17', 81'; Saïss (yellow card) 30'	Stadium: Stade de Gerland; Attendance: 36,068; Referee: Lionel Jaffredo

13 December 2015 18	Angers	1–1	Bordeaux	Angers
17:00 CEST (UTC+02:00)	Angoula (yellow card) 63'; Thomas 83'	Report	Biyogo Poko (yellow card) 22'; Crivelli (yellow card) 37'; Rolán 40'	Stadium: Stade Jean-Bouin; Attendance: 13,702; Referee: Benoît Millot

20 December 2015 19	Saint-Étienne	1–0	Angers	Saint-Étienne
14:00 CET (UTC+01:00)	Lemoine (yellow card) 10'; Corgnet 61'; Ruffier (yellow card) 69'; Roux (yellow card) 70'	Report	Thomas (yellow card) 39'; Sunu (yellow card) 73'; Saïss (yellow card) 85'	Stadium: Stade Geoffroy-Guichard; Attendance: 30,985; Referee: Bartolomeu Varela

9 January 2016 20	Angers	2–0	Caen	Angers
20:00 CET (UTC+01:00)	Capelle 41'; Ketkeophomphone 74'	Report	Delort (yellow card) 61'; Seube (yellow card) 67'	Stadium: Stade Jean-Bouin; Attendance: 12,208; Referee: Nicolas Rainville

15 January 2016 21	OGC Nice	2–1	Angers	Nice
20:30 CET (UTC+01:00)	Hunt (yellow card) 60'; Cardinale (yellow card) 64'; Ben Arfa 80', 84'	Report	Capelle 24'; Saïss (yellow card) 36'; N'Doye (yellow card) 63'; Manceau (yellow card) 83'	Stadium: Allianz Riviera; Attendance: 13,600; Referee: Jérôme Miguelgorry

23 January 2016 22	Paris Saint-Germain	5–1	Angers	Paris
17:00 CET (UTC+01:00)	Ibrahimović 33'; Lucas 40'; Van der Wiel 54'; Di María 63', 66'	Report	Saïss (yellow card) 39'; Capelle 59'	Stadium: Parc des Princes; Attendance: 46,199; Referee: Fredy Fautrel

30 January 2016 23	Angers	3–0	Monaco	Angers
17:00 CET (UTC+01:00)	N'Doye 19', 43'; Capelle (yellow card) 39'; Yattara 55'; Sunu (yellow card) 79'	Report	Costa (yellow card) 26'; Coentrão (yellow card) 29'; Carrillo (yellow card) 70'	Stadium: Stade Jean-Bouin; Attendance: 13,598; Referee: Ruddy Bouquet

3 February 2016 24	Reims	2–1	Angers	Reims
19:00 CET (UTC+01:00)	Traore 43'; Charbonnier 50'	Report	Bouka Moutou 15'; Saïss (yellow card) 49'; Sunu (yellow card) 72'; Andreu (yellow card) 80'; Capelle (red card) 90+1'	Stadium: Stade Auguste Delaune; Attendance: 10,603; Referee: Antony Gautier

6 February 2016 25	Angers	0–3	Lyon	Angers
17:00 CET (UTC+01:00)	Mangani (red card) 16'; N'Doye (yellow card) 61'	Report	Jallet 13', (yellow card) 61'; Ghezzal 46'; Gonalons (yellow card) 65'; Tolisso 81'	Stadium: Stade Jean-Bouin; Attendance: 15,386; Referee: Frank Schneider

12 February 2016 26	Rennes	1–0	Angers	Rennes
20:30 CET (UTC+01:00)	Bouka Moutou 90+2' (o.g.)	Report	Yattara (yellow card) 23'	Stadium: Roazhon Park; Attendance: 18,350; Referee: Stéphane Lannoy

20 February 2016 27	Angers	2–3	Montpellier	Angers
20:00 CET (UTC+01:00)	Bouka Moutou 65'; Karanović 90+2'	Report	Bérigaud 2'; Yatabaré 7'; Camara 34'; Ninga (yellow card) 82'	Stadium: Stade Jean-Bouin; Attendance: 11,165; Referee: Sébastien Moreira

27 February 2016 28	Guingamp	2–2	Angers	Guingamp
20:00 CET (UTC+01:00)	Sankharé (yellow card) 38'; Privat 39'; Giresse 66' (pen.) (yellow card) 68'; Martins Pereira (yellow card) 78'	Report	Capelle 30'; Saïss (yellow card) 37'; N'Doye (red card) 42'; Traoré (yellow card) 65'; Ketkeophomphone 79' (pen.) (yellow card) 86'	Stadium: Stade du Roudourou; Attendance: 13,506; Referee: Benoît Millot

5 March 2016 29	Angers	0–0	Saint-Étienne	Angers
20:00 CET (UTC+01:00)	Sunu (yellow card) 26'; Mangani (yellow card) 63'; Thomas (yellow card) 66'; Saïss (yellow card) 75'	Report	Lemoine (yellow card) 22'; Eysseric (yellow card) 67'; Clément (yellow card) 90+2'	Stadium: Stade Jean-Bouin; Attendance: 15,892; Referee: Antony Gautier

13 March 2016 30	Nantes	2–0	Angers	Nantes
17:00 CET (UTC+01:00)	Adryan (yellow card) 26'; Gomis (yellow card) 36'; Sala 49', 69'	Report	N'Doye (yellow card) 7'; Traoré (yellow card) 45'; Angoula (yellow card) 87'	Stadium: Stade de la Beaujoire; Attendance: 32,611; Referee: Benoît Bastien

19 March 2016 31	Angers	5–1	Lorient	Angers
20:00 CET (UTC+01:00)	Ketkeophomphone 14'; Mangani 34', 90+1' (pen.); Saïss 40'; Andreu (yellow card) 63'; N'Doye 81'	Report	Gassama (yellow card) 4'; N'Dong (yellow card) 38'; Waris 41' (yellow card) 60'; Le Goff (yellow card) 72'	Stadium: Stade Jean-Bouin; Attendance: 11,553; Referee: Johan Hamel

2 April 2016 32	Troyes	0–1	Angers	Troyes
20:00 CEST (UTC+02:00)	Confais (yellow card) 39'	Report	Ketkeophomphone (yellow card) 90'; Diers 90+2'	Stadium: Stade de l'Aube; Attendance: 10,472; Referee: Stéphane Jochem

9 April 2016 33	Angers	0–0	Gazélec Ajaccio	Angers
20:00 CEST (UTC+02:00)	Mangani (yellow card) 18'	Report	Lemoigne (yellow card) 17'; Filippi (yellow card) 18'; Youga (yellow card) 51'; Poggi (yellow card) 56'; Sylla (yellow card) 79'	Stadium: Stade Jean-Bouin; Attendance: 11,474; Referee: Jérôme Miguelgorry

15 April 2016 34	Bordeaux	1–3	Angers	Bordeaux
20:00 CEST (UTC+02:00)	Guilbert (yellow card) 24'; Debuchy (yellow card) 54'; Rolán 70'	Report	Capelle (yellow card) 15'; Traoré (red card) 34'; N'Doye 61'; Yattara 64'; Andreu (yellow card) 69'; Bourillon 87'	Stadium: Nouveau Stade de Bordeaux; Attendance: 24,611; Referee: Ruddy Bequet

27 April 2016 35	Lille	0–0	Angers	Villeneuve-d'Ascq
18:30 CEST (UTC+2)	Obbadi (yellow card) 64'	Report	Thomas (yellow card) 61'; Capelle (yellow card) 71'; Bouka Moutou (yellow card) 80'; Letellier (yellow card) 87'	Stadium: Stade Pierre-Mauroy; Attendance: 32,001; Referee: Johan Hamel

30 April 2016 36	Angers	0–1	Marseille	Angers
17:00 CET (UTC+01:00)	Mangani (yellow card) 13'; Thomas (yellow card) 71'	Report	Mendy (yellow card) 21'; Batshuayi 24', (yellow card) 88'; Fletcher (yellow card) 52'; Manquillo (yellow card) 90+2'	Stadium: Stade Jean-Bouin; Attendance: 16,198; Referee: Tony Chapron

7 May 2016 37	Bastia	1–0	Angers	Bastia
21:00 CET (UTC+01:00)	Cahuzac 43', (yellow card) 55'	Report	Angoula (yellow card) 73'	Stadium: Stade Armand Cesari; Attendance: 11,817; Referee: Stéphane Lannoy

14 May 2016 38	Angers	2-3	Toulouse	Angers
14:00 CET (UTC+01:00)	Bouka Moutou (yellow card) 2'; Ketkeophomphone 12'; Benrahma 63'; Bourillon (yellow card) 69'; Yattara (yellow card) 75'; Saïss (yellow card) 79'	Report	Ben Yedder 59'; Yago (yellow card) 74'; Braithwaite 78'; Bodiger 80'	Stadium: Stade Jean-Bouin; Attendance: 15,131; Referee: Fredy Fautrel

=== Coupe de France ===
2 January 2016 Round of 64	Besançon	1–3	Angers	Besançon
18:00 CET (UTC+01:00)	Grand 86'	Report	Traoré 6'; N'Doye 17'; Diers 67'	Stadium: Stade Léo Lagrange; Attendance: 6,000; Referee: Didier Falcone

19 January 2016 Round of 32	Angers	1–2	Bordeaux	Angers
18:00 CET (UTC+01:00)	N'Doye (yellow card) 15'; Ketkeophomphone 69' (yellow card) 71'; Moutou (yellow card) 83'	Report	Jussiê 45'; Crivelli 58'; Touré (yellow card) 78'	Stadium: Stade Jean-Bouin; Attendance: 4,484; Referee: Stéphane Lanno

=== Coupe de la Ligue ===
27 October 2015 Round of 32	Tours	1–0	Angers	Tours
20:00 CET (UTC+01:00)	Agouazi (yellow card) 25'; Belkebla (yellow card) 48'; Miracoli 53'; Bergougnoux (yellow card) 67'; Santamaria (yellow card) 89'	Report	Moutou (yellow card) 74'; Saïss (yellow card) 83'; Auriac (yellow card) 88'	Stadium: Stade de la Vallée du Cher; Attendance: 10,104; Referee: Hakim Ben El Hadj
