= 2016–17 Angers SCO season =

Angers
2016–17 season
- Chairman: Saïd Chabane
- Manager: Stéphane Moulin
- Stadium: Stade Raymond Kopa
- Ligue 1: 12th
- Coupe de France: Runner-up
- Coupe de la Ligue: Round of 32
- Top goalscorer: League: Famara Diédhiou (8); All: Famara Diédhiou & Karl Toko Ekambi (9)
- Highest home attendance: 15,909 (v. PSG; 14 April 2017)
- Lowest home attendance: 4,059 (v. Caen; 1 February 2017)
Home colours	Away colours

The 2016–17 season is Angers SCO's second consecutive season in Ligue 1 since promotion from Ligue 2 in 2015. They are participating in the Ligue 1, the Coupe de France, and the Coupe de la Ligue.

== Squad ==
As of 25 January 2017.

Note: Flags indicate national team as defined under FIFA eligibility rules; some limited exceptions apply. Players may hold more than one non-FIFA nationality.

No.	Pos.	Nation	Player
1	GK	SRB	Denis Petrić
2	FW	FRA	Kévin Bérigaud (on loan from Montpellier)
3	DF	FRA	Yoann Andreu
4	DF	CRO	Mateo Pavlović
5	MF	FRA	Thomas Mangani
6	DF	FRA	Grégory Bourillon
7	FW	CMR	Karl Toko Ekambi
8	MF	CIV	Ismaël Traoré
9	FW	SEN	Famara Diédhiou
10	FW	FRA	Gilles Sunu
11	FW	NGR	Dickson Nwakaeme
14	FW	FRA	Billy Ketkeophomphone
15	MF	FRA	Pierrick Capelle
16	GK	FRA	Mathieu Michel
17	MF	SEN	Cheikh N'Doye (captain)

No.	Pos.	Nation	Player
18	MF	FRA	Baptiste Santamaria
19	FW	CIV	Nicolas Pépé
20	MF	FRA	Flavien Tait
21	DF	FRA	Pablo Martinez
22	FW	FRA	Jonathan Bamba (on loan from St-Étienne)
23	MF	TUN	Jamel Saihi
24	DF	FRA	Romain Thomas
25	DF	CIV	Abdoulaye Bamba
26	MF	ALG	Mehdi Tahrat
27	FW	CGO	Férébory Doré
28	DF	SEN	Issa Cissokho
29	DF	FRA	Vincent Manceau
30	GK	FRA	Alexandre Letellier
—	MF	FRA	Mathias Serin

=== Out on loan ===
Note: Flags indicate national team as defined under FIFA eligibility rules; some limited exceptions apply. Players may hold more than one non-FIFA nationality.

No.	Pos.	Nation	Player
—	DF	FRA	Gabriel Mutombo (on loan to CA Bastia)
—	MF	FRA	Aïssa Laïdouni (on loan to Les Herbiers)

No.	Pos.	Nation	Player
—	FW	SUI	Goran Karanović (on loan to Sochaux)
—	FW	FRA	Yoane Wissa (on loan to Laval)

== Competitions ==
=== Ligue 1 ===
==== League table ====
Pos	Team	Pld	W	D	L	GF	GA	GD	Pts
10	Guingamp	38	14	8	16	46	53	−7	50
11	Lille	38	13	7	18	40	47	−7	46
12	Angers	38	13	7	18	40	49	−9	46
13	Toulouse	38	10	14	14	37	41	−4	44
14	Metz	38	11	10	17	39	72	−33	43

Source: Ligue 1, Soccerway
Rules for classification: 1) Points; 2) Goal difference; 3) Goals scored; 4) Head-to-head goal difference; 5) Fairplay ranking.

==== Results summary ====
Overall								Home						Away					
Pld	W	D	L	GF	GA	GD	Pts	W	D	L	GF	GA	GD	W	D	L	GF	GA	GD
38	13	7	18	40	49	−9	46	8	5	6	23	17	+6	5	2	12	17	32	−15

Last updated: 20 May 2017.
Source: Results

==== Results by round ====
Round	1	2	3	4	5	6	7	8	9	10	11	12	13	14	15	16	17	18	19	20	21	22	23	24	25	26	27	28	29	30	31	32	33	34	35	36	37	38
Ground	A	H	A	H	A	H	A	H	A	H	A	H	A	H	A	H	A	H	A	H	A	H	A	H	A	H	H	A	A	H	A	H	H	A	H	A	A	H
Result	L	L	L	W	W	W	L	D	W	D	L	W	D	L	L	D	L	L	L	D	L	W	L	D	W	W	W	W	L	W	L	L	L	L	L	D	W	W
Position	18	18	18	17	13	11	12	12	10	9	11	10	10	10	10	11	12	15	17	18	19	17	18	18	16	13	12	10	12	9	12	12	13	14	14	14	13	12

Source: Ligue1
A = Away; H = Home; W = Win; D = Draw; L = Loss

==== Results ====
13 August 2016 1	Montpellier	1–0	Angers	Montpellier
20:00 CEST (UTC+2)	Boudebouz 8'; Mounié (yellow card) 76'	Report	Thomas (yellow card) 21'; Capelle (yellow card) 39'	Stadium: Stade de la Mosson; Attendance: 10,389; Referee: Bartolomeu Varela

20 August 2016 2	Angers	0–1	Nice	Angers
20:00 CEST (UTC+2)	Bourillon (yellow card) 16'	Report	Pléa 4'; Dalbert (yellow card) 49'; Pereira (yellow card) 78'	Stadium: Stade Raymond Kopa; Attendance: 10,186; Referee: Jérôme Miguelgorry

27 August 2016 3	Metz	2–0	Angers	Metz
20:00 CEST (UTC+2)	Doukouré (yellow card) 21'; Falette 42'; Signorino (yellow card) 86'; Milán 89'	Report	Martinez (yellow card) 45+1'; Ketkeophomphone (yellow card) 87'	Stadium: Stade Saint-Symphorien; Attendance: 14,805; Referee: Karim Abed

10 September 2016 4	Angers	3–1	Dijon	Angers
20:00 CEST (UTC+2)	Diédhiou 15'; Ketkeophomphone (yellow card) 19' (yellow-red card) 34'; N'Doye 67', (yellow card) 68'; Toko Ekambi 75'	Report	Sammaritano 8'; Rüfli (yellow card) 18'; Varrault (yellow card) 30'; Marié (yellow card) 48' (yellow-red card) 51'	Stadium: Stade Raymond Kopa; Attendance: 9,549; Referee: Mikael Lesage

17 September 2016 5	Bordeaux	0–1	Angers	Bordeaux
20:00 CEST (UTC+02:00)	Rolan (red card) 85'	Report	Thomas (yellow card) 9'; Toko Ekambi 38'; Capelle (yellow card) 45+1'; Andreu (yellow card) 54'; Michel (yellow card) 88'	Stadium: Nouveau Stade de Bordeaux; Attendance: 18,129; Referee: Olivier Thual

21 September 2016 6	Angers	2–1	Caen	Angers
19:00 CEST (UTC+2)	Ketkeophomphone 12'; Da Silva 54' (o.g.)	Report	Féret (yellow card) 30'; Karamoh 71'	Stadium: Stade Raymond Kopa; Attendance: 10,504; Referee: François Letexier

24 September 2016 7	AS Monaco	2–1	Angers	Fontvieille
20:00 CEST (UTC+2)	Glik 66'; Fabinho (yellow card) 73'; Nwakaeme 76' (o.g.)	Report	Diédhiou 55'; Nwakaeme (yellow card) 75'	Stadium: Stade Louis II; Attendance: 6,019; Referee: Jérôme Miguelgorry

2 October 2016 8	Angers	1–1	Marseille	Angers
15:00 CEST (UTC+02:00)	Andreu (yellow card) 77'; Capelle 90+3'	Report	Thauvin 64'	Stadium: Stade Raymond Kopa; Attendance: 14,637; Referee: Johan Hamel

15 October 2016 9	Bastia	1–2	Angers	Furiani
20:00 CEST (UTC+02:00)	Bifouma 45'; Cioni (yellow card) 60'; Cahuzac (yellow card) 79'	Report	Diédhiou 26', 56'	Stadium: Stade Armand Cesari; Attendance: 9,303; Referee: Nicolas Rainville

22 October 2016 10	Angers	0–0	Toulouse	Angers
20:00 CET (UTC+01:00)	Martinez (yellow card) 47'; Mangani (yellow card) 66'	Report	Sylla (yellow card) 28'; Durmaz (yellow card) 59'; Blin (yellow card) 66'; Bodiger (yellow card) 75'	Stadium: Stade Raymond Kopa; Attendance: 11,775; Referee: Bartolomeu Varela

29 October 2016 11	Guingamp	1–0	Angers	Guingamp
20:00 CEST (UTC+01:00)	De Pauw 78'; Didot (yellow card) 90+3'	Report	Santamaria (yellow card) 44'; Sunu (yellow card) 55'; Manceau (yellow card) 56'	Stadium: Stade de Roudourou; Attendance: 15,277; Referee: Sébastien Desage

22 October 2016 12	Angers	1–0	Lille	Angers
20:00 CET (UTC+01:00)	Diédhiou 54'	Report		Stadium: Stade Raymond Kopa; Attendance: 9,749; Referee: Clément Turpin

29 October 2016 13	Rennes	1–1	Angers	Rennes
20:00 CEST (UTC+01:00)	Sio 22'; Gourcuff (yellow card) 69'; Mendes (yellow card) 74'	Report	Andreu (yellow card) 35'; Manceau (yellow card) 56'; Thomas (red card) 58'; Pépé 82'; N'Doye (red card) 90+2'	Stadium: Roazhon Park; Attendance: 23,142; Referee: Mikael Lesage

27 November 2016 14	Angers	1–2	Saint-Étienne	Angers
15:00 CEST (UTC+2)	Pépé 18'; Manceau (yellow card) 24'; Martinez (yellow card) 68'; Capelle (yellow card) 74'	Report	Dabo (yellow card) 11'; Lacroix (yellow card) 45'; Malcuit (yellow card) 47' (yellow-red card) 90+4'; Pogba 59'; Tannane 78'	Stadium: Stade Raymond Kopa; Attendance: 13,293; Referee: Johan Hamel

30 November 2016 15	Paris Saint-Germain	2–0	Angers	Paris
21:00 CET (UTC+1)	Silva 34'; Cavani 66', (yellow card) 67'; Krychowiak (yellow card) 84'	Report	Diédhiou (yellow card) 80'	Stadium: Parc des Princes; Attendance: 40,597; Referee: Frank Schneider

3 December 2016 16	Angers	2–2	Lorient	Angers
20:00 CET (UTC+1)	Diédhiou 26' (pen.); N'Doye 58'	Report	Marveaux 23'; Le Goff (yellow card) 25'; Waris 66'	Stadium: Stade Raymond Kopa; Attendance: 9,142; Referee: Olivier Thual

10 December 2016 17	Nancy	1–0	Angers	Tomblaine
20:00 CET (UTC+01:00)	Dia 29'; Puyo 63'; Marchetti (yellow card) 78'	Report	Pépé (yellow card) 90'	Stadium: Stade Marcel Picot; Attendance: 17,205; Referee: Sébastien Desage

16 December 2016 18	Angers	0–2	Nantes	Angers
20:45 CET (UTC+1)	N'Doye (yellow card) 29'	Report	Gillet 19'; Vizcarrondo (yellow card) 24'; Harit 48'; Iloki (yellow card) 55'; Stępiński (yellow card) 62'	Stadium: Stade Raymond Kopa; Attendance: 12,857; Referee: Amaury Delerue

21 December 2016 19	Lyon	2–0	Angers	Décines-Charpieu
20:45 CEST (UTC+2)	Lacazette 9'; Fekir 84'	Report	Diédhiou (yellow card) 34'; Pavlović (yellow card) 77'	Stadium: Parc Olympique Lyonnais; Attendance: 32,098; Referee: Frank Schneider

14 January 2017 20	Angers	1–1	Bordeaux	Angers
20:00 CEST (UTC+2)	Traoré 14', (yellow card) 41'; Tahrat (yellow card) 18'; Pavlović (yellow card) 66'; Tait (yellow card) 80'	Report	Rolán (yellow card) 21'; Santamaria 27' (o.g.); Toulalan (yellow card) 60'; Kamano (yellow card) 82'	Stadium: Stade Raymond Kopa; Attendance: 10,056; Referee: Johan Hamel

22 January 2017 21	Saint-Étienne	2–1	Angers	Saint-Étienne
17:00 CEST (UTC+2)	Veretout (yellow card) 44'; Bamba 51' (o.g.); Polomat (yellow card) 67'; Perrin 75'	Report	Pavlović 17'; Bamba (yellow card) 23'; Capelle (yellow card) 45+1'; Traoré (yellow card) 52'	Stadium: Stade Geoffroy-Guichard; Attendance: 20,456; Referee: Benoît Bastien

28 January 2017 22	Angers	2–1	Metz	Angers
20:00 CEST (UTC+2)	Tait 25'; Pépé 35'	Report	Traoré 33' (o.g.); Cohade (red card) 39'; Diagne (red card) 66'	Stadium: Stade Raymond Kopa; Attendance: 10,540; Referee: Karim Abed

5 February 2017 23	Toulouse	4–0	Angers	Toulouse
15:00 CEST (UTC+2)	Delort 47'; Braithwaite 56' (pen.); Trejo (yellow card) 55', (goal) 69'; Bodiger (yellow card) 66'; Toivonen 89'	Report	Cissokho (yellow card) 39'; Pépé (yellow card) 45'; Tahrat (yellow card) 48'; Petrić (yellow card) 55'	Stadium: Stadium Municipal; Attendance: 15,300; Referee: Jérôme Brisard

8 February 2017 24	Angers	0–0	Rennes	Angers
19:00 CEST (UTC+2)	Diédhiou (yellow card) 39'; Thomas (yellow card) 78'	Report	André (yellow card) 52'; Baal (red card) 85'	Stadium: Stade Raymond Kopa; Attendance: 10,897; Referee: Clément Turpin

11 February 2017 25	Lille	1–2	Angers	Villeneuve-d'Ascq
20:00 CEST (UTC+2)	Bissouma 27', (red card) 83'; El Ghazi (yellow card) 62'	Report	Capelle 20'; Traoré (yellow card) 24'; Thomas 60'; Diédhiou (yellow card) 81'	Stadium: Stade Pierre-Mauroy; Attendance: 25,731; Referee: Bartolomeu Varela

18 February 2017 26	Angers	1–0	Nancy	Angers
20:00 CEST (UTC+2)	Bamba 5'	Report	Diarra (yellow card) 10'	Stadium: Stade Raymond Kopa; Attendance: 10,569; Referee: Olivier Thual

25 February 2017 27	Angers	3–0	Bastia	Angers
20:00 CEST (UTC+2)	Toko Ekambi 18', 57'; Cissokho (yellow card) 50'; Bourillon 79'; Bérigaud (yellow card) 80'	Report	Cahuzac (red card) 74'	Stadium: Stade Raymond Kopa; Attendance: 12,205; Referee: Karim Abed

4 March 2017 28	Caen	2–3	Angers	Caen
20:00 CEST (UTC+2)	Rodelin 11'; Guilbert (yellow card) 35'; Santini 67'	Report	Toko Ekambi 5'; N'Doye 21', (yellow card) 73'; Mangani 48' (pen.); Martinez (yellow card) 88'	Stadium: Stade Michel d'Ornano; Attendance: 16,522; Referee: Tony Chapron

10 March 2017 29	Marseille	3–0	Angers	Marseille
20:45 CEST (UTC+2)	Thauvin 9', 77'; Cabella 20'; Bedimo (yellow card) 88'	Report		Stadium: Orange Vélodrome; Attendance: 33,954; Referee: (France) Frank Schneider

18 March 2017 30	Angers	3–0	Guingamp	Angers
20:00 CEST (UTC+2)	N'Doye (yellow card) 36'; A. Bamba (yellow card) 48'; J. Bamba 63'; Diédhiou 83'	Report	Didot (yellow card) 56'	Stadium: Stade Raymond Kopa; Attendance: 13,490; Referee: Jérôme Brisard

2 April 2017 31	Nantes	2–1	Angers	Nantes
17:00 CEST (UTC+2)	Nakoulma 47', 54'; Oliveira (yellow card) 76'	Report	Manceau (yellow card) 21'; Diédhiou 55'; Cissokho (red card) 86'	Stadium: Stade de la Beaujoire; Attendance: 28,192; Referee: Olivier Thual

8 April 2017 32	Angers	0–1	AS Monaco	Angers
17:00 CEST (UTC+2)	Mangani (yellow card) 77'; N'Doye (yellow card) 84'	Report	Falcao 61'; Dirar (yellow card) 77'	Stadium: Stade Jean-Bouin; Attendance: 15,235; Referee: Bartolomeu Varela

14 April 2017 32	Angers	0–2	Paris Saint-Germain	Angers
20:45 CEST (UTC+2)	Thomas (yellow card) 12'; Diédhiou (yellow card) 58'	Report	Verratti (yellow card) 12'; Di María 28', 84'	Stadium: Stade Raymond Kopa; Attendance: 15,909; Referee: Tony Chapron

22 April 2017 34	Dijon	3–2	Angers	Dijon
CEST (UTC+2)	Diony 5', 43'; Lees-Melou 16'; Chafik (yellow card) 67'; Lotiès (yellow card) 90+3'	Report	Mangani 68' (pen.), (yellow card) 81'; Toko Ekambi 70'; Diédhiou (yellow card) 84'	Stadium: Stade Gaston Gérard; Attendance: 10,418; Referee: Sébastien Desiage

28 April 2017 35	Angers	1–2	Lyon	Angers
20:45 CEST (UTC+2)	N'Doye 49'; Thomas (yellow card) 51'; Pavlović (red card) 77'; Manceau (yellow card) 80'	Report	Valbuena 17', (yellow card) 35'; Gonalons (yellow card) 39'; Fekir 42', (yellow card) 44'	Stadium: Stade Raymond Kopa; Attendance: 14,699; Referee: Antony Gautier

6 May 2017 36	Lorient	1–1	Angers	Lorient
20:00 CEST (UTC+2)	Philippoteaux 62'; Ciani (yellow card) 75'	Report	Manceau 72'	Stadium: Stade du Moustoir - Yves Allainmat; Attendance: 15,563; Referee: Clément Turpin

14 May 2017 37	OGC Nice	0–2	Angers	Nice
21:00 CEST (UTC+2)	Belhanda (yellow card) 32'	Report	Santamaria (yellow card) 24'; N'Doye 35'; Toko Ekambi 90+3'	Stadium: Allianz Riviera; Attendance: 32,446; Referee: Mikael Lesage

20 May 2017 38	Angers	2–0	Montpellier	Angers
21:00 CEST (UTC+2)	Bamba 82'; Tait 88'	Report	Pokorný (yellow card) 24'; Passi (yellow card) 28'	Stadium: Stade Raymond Kopa; Attendance: 11,860; Referee: Lionel Jaffredo

=== Coupe de France ===
8 January 2017 Last 64	Granville	1–2	Angers	Granville
17:00	Florian Jégu 9'; Hugo Connan (yellow card) 46'; Sami Mghinia (yellow card) 89'	Report	Benyahya 24' (o.g.); Nwakaeme 60'	Stadium: Stade Louis Dior; Attendance: 2,878; Referee: (France) Beniot Millot

1 February 2017 Last 32	Angers	3–1	Caen	Angers
18:00	Mangani 15' (pen.), 82' (pen.); Capelle 89'	Report	Thomas 36' (o.g.); Makengo (yellow card) 71'; Diomandé (yellow card) 90+2'	Stadium: Stade Raymond Kopa; Attendance: 4,059; Referee: (France) Tony Chapron

28 February 2017 Last 16	CA Bastia	0–1	Angers	Ajaccio
18:00		Report	Bamba (yellow card) 34'; Diédhiou 40'	Stadium: Stade Ange Casanova; Attendance: 1,167; Referee: (France) Amaury Delerue

5 April 2017 Quarter-Final	Angers	2–1	Bordeaux	Angers
18:30	Bérigaud 8'; Pavlović (yellow card) 58'; N'Doye 67'	Report	Sankharé 18'; Ménez (yellow card) 33'; Jovanović (yellow card) 76'	Stadium: Stade Raymond Kopa; Attendance: 12,507; Referee: (France) Antony Gautier

25 April 2017 Semi-final	Angers	2–0	Guingamp	Angers
21:00	Mangani 38', (yellow card) 90'; Bamba (yellow card) 50'; Toko Ekambi 90+2'	Report	Kerbrat (yellow card) 19'; Diallo (yellow card) 60'; Didot (yellow card) 75'	Stadium: Stade Raymond Kopa; Attendance: 15,540; Referee: (France) Benoît Millot

27 May 2017 Final	Angers	0–1	Paris Saint-Germain	Saint-Denis
21:00		Report	Cissokho 90+1' (o.g.)	Stadium: Stade de France; Referee: Benoît Bastien

=== Coupe de la Ligue ===
25 October 2016 Last 32	Nantes	2–1	Angers	Nantes
21:00	Sala 28'; Thomasson 47'; Kwateng (yellow card) 50'; Dupé (yellow card) 68'; Harit (yellow card) 90+1'	Report	Capelle 51' (pen.); Tait (yellow card) 60'; Pépé (yellow card) 67'; Pavlović (yellow card) 69'	Stadium: Stade de la Beaujoire - Louis Fonteneau; Attendance: 32,003; Referee: (France) Tony Chapron
