= List of French football transfers winter 2015–16 =

This is a list of French football transfers for the 2015–16 winter transfer window. Only moves featuring Ligue 1 or Ligue 2 are listed.

== Ligue 1 ==
Note: Flags indicate national team as has been defined under FIFA eligibility rules. Players may hold more than one non-FIFA nationality.

=== Angers SCO ===
In:

No.	Pos.	Nation	Player
1	GK	SVN	Denis Petrić (from Troyes)
6	DF	FRA	Grégory Bourillon (from Stade Reims)
9	FW	GUI	Mohamed Yattara (on loan from (Belgium) Standard Liège)
25	FW	ALG	Saïd Benrahma (on loan from Nice)

Out:

No.	Pos.	Nation	Player
1	GK	FRA	Ludovic Butelle (to (Belgium) Club Brugge)
4	DF	TUN	Bilel Mohsni (to Paris)
6	MF	MLI	Ismaël Keïta (to Paris)
9	FW	GUI	Abdoul Camara (to (England) Derby County)
25	DF	ALG	Antar Yahia (on loan to Orléans)
—	DF	MLI	Kalifa Traoré (on loan to Les Herbies)
—	MF	BRA	Pessalli (on loan to Vendée Luçon)
—	FW	ARG	Diego Gómez (on loan to Boulogne)

=== SC Bastia ===
In:

No.	Pos.	Nation	Player

Out:

No.	Pos.	Nation	Player
10	MF	FRA	Lyes Houri (on loan to Belfort)

=== FC Girondins de Bordeaux ===
In:

No.	Pos.	Nation	Player
24	DF	FRA	Mathieu Debuchy (on loan from (England) Arsenal)

Out:

No.	Pos.	Nation	Player
10	MF	SEN	Henri Saivet (to (England) Newcastle United)
15	FW	FRA	Gaëtan Laborde (on loan to Clermont Foot)
24	MF	TUN	Wahbi Khazri (to (England) Sunderland)

=== SM Caen ===
In:

No.	Pos.	Nation	Player

Out:

No.	Pos.	Nation	Player

=== Gazélec Ajaccio ===
In:

No.	Pos.	Nation	Player
27	FW	TUN	Amine Chermiti (from (Switzerland) Zürich)

Out:

No.	Pos.	Nation	Player
22	MF	SEN	Issiar Dia (released)

=== En Avant de Guingamp ===
In:

No.	Pos.	Nation	Player
22	DF	FRA	Jonathan Martins Pereira (from Troyes)
28	FW	TUR	Mevlüt Erdinç (on loan from (Germany) Hannover 96)

Out:

No.	Pos.	Nation	Player
17	MF	FRA	Julien Bègue (on loan to Bourg Péronnas)

=== Lille OSC ===
In:

No.	Pos.	Nation	Player
31	MF	FRA	Morgan Amalfitano (free agent)
39	FW	POR	Éder (on loan from (Wales) Swansea City)

Out:

No.	Pos.	Nation	Player
17	MF	FRA	Souahilo Meïté (on loan to (Belgium) Zulte Waregem)
26	MF	POR	Alexis Araujo (on loan to Boulogne)

=== FC Lorient ===
In:

No.	Pos.	Nation	Player

Out:

No.	Pos.	Nation	Player
20	MF	FRA	Denis Bouanga (on loan to Strasbourg)

=== Olympique Lyonnais ===
In:

No.	Pos.	Nation	Player

Out:

No.	Pos.	Nation	Player
5	DF	SRB	Milan Biševac (to (Italy) Lazio)
9	FW	GLP	Claudio Beauvue (to (Spain) Celta Vigo)

=== Olympique de Marseille ===
In:

No.	Pos.	Nation	Player
9	FW	SCO	Steven Fletcher (on loan from (England) Sunderland)
24	MF	FRA	Florian Thauvin (on loan from (England) Newcastle United)

Out:

No.	Pos.	Nation	Player

=== AS Monaco ===
In:

No.	Pos.	Nation	Player
9	FW	BRA	Vágner Love (from (Brazil) Corinthians)
—	MF	GHA	David Mills (loan return from Paris)

Out:

No.	Pos.	Nation	Player
29	MF	BRA	Gabriel Boschilia (on loan to (Belgium) Standard Liège)
31	MF	POR	Gil Bastião Dias (on loan to (Portugal) Varzim)
—	FW	GUI	Tafsir Chérif (on loan to (Portugal) Varzim)

=== Montpellier HSC ===
In:

No.	Pos.	Nation	Player

Out:

No.	Pos.	Nation	Player

=== FC Nantes ===
In:

No.	Pos.	Nation	Player
27	MF	BEL	Guillaume Gillet (from (Belgium) Anderlecht)

Out:

No.	Pos.	Nation	Player
11	FW	GUI	Ismaël Bangoura (to (Saudi Arabia) Al-Raed)
18	MF	FRA	Lucas Déaux (to (Belgium) Gent)

=== OGC Nice ===
In:

No.	Pos.	Nation	Player
18	MF	FRA	Rémi Walter (from Nancy)

Out:

No.	Pos.	Nation	Player
7	MF	BEL	Julien Vercauteren (on loan to (Belgium) Westerlo)
11	FW	ALG	Saïd Benrahma (on loan to Angers)

=== Paris Saint Germain ===
In:

No.	Pos.	Nation	Player

Out:

No.	Pos.	Nation	Player

=== Stade de Reims ===
In:

No.	Pos.	Nation	Player

Out:

No.	Pos.	Nation	Player
—	DF	FRA	Grégory Bourillon (to Angers)

=== Stade Rennais F.C. ===
In:

No.	Pos.	Nation	Player

Out:

No.	Pos.	Nation	Player
8	MF	FRA	Abdoulaye Doucouré (to (England) Watford)

=== AS Saint-Étienne ===
In:

No.	Pos.	Nation	Player
4	FW	NED	Oussama Tannane (from (Netherlands) Heracles Almelo)
13	DF	FRA	Franck Tabanou (on loan from (Wales) Swansea City)
17	MF	NOR	Ole Selnæs (from (Norway) Rosenborg)
23	FW	NOR	Alexander Søderlund (from (Norway) Rosenborg)

Out:

No.	Pos.	Nation	Player
17	MF	FRA	Jonathan Bamba (on loan to Paris)
34	FW	FRA	Dylan Saint-Louis (on loan to Evian)

=== Toulouse FC ===
In:

No.	Pos.	Nation	Player

Out:

No.	Pos.	Nation	Player
21	MF	COL	Abel Aguilar (on loan to (Portugal) Belenenses)
30	GK	FRA	Ali Ahamada (to (Turkey) Kayserispor)
—	MF	POL	Dominik Furman (on loan to (Italy) Hellas Verona)
—	MF	ROU	Dragoș Grigore (to (Qatar) Al-Sailiya)

=== Troyes AC ===
In:

No.	Pos.	Nation	Player

Out:

No.	Pos.	Nation	Player
6	DF	FRA	Jonathan Martins Pereira (to EA Guingamp)
30	GK	SVN	Denis Petrić (to Angers)

== Ligue 2 ==
=== AC Ajaccio ===
In:

No.	Pos.	Nation	Player

Out:

No.	Pos.	Nation	Player

=== AJ Auxerre ===
In:

No.	Pos.	Nation	Player

Out:

No.	Pos.	Nation	Player
7	MF	FRA	Pierre Bouby (on loan to Orléans)

=== Bourg-Péronnas ===
In:

No.	Pos.	Nation	Player
13	MF	FRA	Julien Bègue (on loan from Guingamp)

Out:

No.	Pos.	Nation	Player

=== Stade Brestois 29 ===
In:

No.	Pos.	Nation	Player
2	DF	SEN	Vieux Sané (free agent)

Out:

No.	Pos.	Nation	Player

=== Clermont Foot ===
In:

No.	Pos.	Nation	Player
9	FW	FRA	Gaëtan Laborde (on loan from Bordeaux)

Out:

No.	Pos.	Nation	Player

=== US Créteil-Lusitanos ===
In:

No.	Pos.	Nation	Player

Out:

No.	Pos.	Nation	Player

=== Dijon FCO ===
In:

No.	Pos.	Nation	Player

Out:

No.	Pos.	Nation	Player

=== Evian Thonon Gaillard F.C. ===
In:

No.	Pos.	Nation	Player
26	FW	FRA	Dylan Saint-Louis (on loan from Saint-Étienne)

Out:

No.	Pos.	Nation	Player

=== Stade Lavallois ===
In:

No.	Pos.	Nation	Player

Out:

No.	Pos.	Nation	Player

=== Le Havre AC ===
In:

No.	Pos.	Nation	Player

Out:

No.	Pos.	Nation	Player

=== RC Lens ===
In:

No.	Pos.	Nation	Player

Out:

No.	Pos.	Nation	Player

=== FC Metz ===
In:

No.	Pos.	Nation	Player

Out:

No.	Pos.	Nation	Player

=== AS Nancy ===
In:

No.	Pos.	Nation	Player

Out:

No.	Pos.	Nation	Player
8	MF	FRA	Rémi Walter (to Nice)

=== Nîmes Olympique ===
In:

No.	Pos.	Nation	Player

Out:

No.	Pos.	Nation	Player
19	MF	CMR	Fabien Tchenkoua (to (Belgium) Sint-Truiden)

=== Chamois Niortais F.C. ===
In:

No.	Pos.	Nation	Player

Out:

No.	Pos.	Nation	Player

=== Paris FC ===
In:

No.	Pos.	Nation	Player
3	DF	TUN	Bilel Mohsni (from Angers)
4	MF	MLI	Ismaël Keïta (from Angers)
—	MF	FRA	Jonathan Bamba (on loan from Saint-Étienne)

Out:

No.	Pos.	Nation	Player
18	MF	GHA	David Mills (loan return to Monaco)

=== Red Star FC ===
In:

No.	Pos.	Nation	Player

Out:

No.	Pos.	Nation	Player

=== FC Sochaux-Montbéliard ===
In:

No.	Pos.	Nation	Player

Out:

No.	Pos.	Nation	Player

=== Tours FC ===
In:

No.	Pos.	Nation	Player

Out:

No.	Pos.	Nation	Player

=== Valenciennes FC ===
In:

No.	Pos.	Nation	Player

Out:

No.	Pos.	Nation	Player

== See also ==
- 2015–16 Ligue 1
- 2015–16 Ligue 2
