= Pierrick Capelle =

French footballer (born 1987)

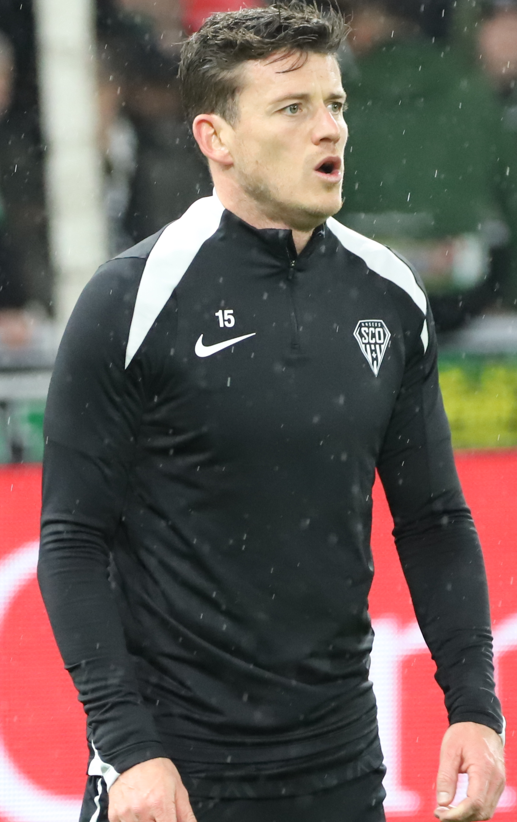
- Capelle with Angers in 2025

Personal information
- Date of birth: 15 April 1987 (age 39)
- Place of birth: Lesquin, France
- Height: 1.81 m (5 ft 11 in)
- Position: Midfielder

Senior career*
Years	Team	Apps	(Gls)
2005–2006	Conflans		
2006–2007	Saint-Ouen-l'Aumône		
2007–2008	Hénin-Beaumont		
2008–2011	Avion	40	(12)
2011–2012	Quevilly	36	(6)
2012–2015	Clermont	75	(6)
2014	Clermont B	5	(3)
2015–2026	Angers	298	(20)
2015–2019	Angers B	6	(1)
- * Club domestic league appearances and goals

Pierrick Capelle (born 15 April 1987) is a French former professional footballer who played as a midfielder.

== Career statistics ==
As of match played 17 May 2024

Appearances and goals by club, season and competition
Club	Season	League			National cup		League cup		Europe		Total	
Club	Season	Division	Apps	Goals	Apps	Goals	Apps	Goals	Apps	Goals	Apps	Goals
Avion	2009–10	CFA 2	12	4	2	0	—		—		14	4
Avion	2010–11	CFA	28	8	0	0	—		—		28	8
Avion	Total		40	12	2	0	—		—		42	12
Quevilly	2011–12	National	36	6	8	4	—		—		44	10
Clermont	2012–13	Ligue 2	35	4	0	0	2	1	—		37	5
Clermont	2013–14	Ligue 2	7	0	0	0	0	0	—		7	0
Clermont	2014–15	Ligue 2	33	2	2	0	2	1	—		37	3
Clermont	Total		75	6	2	0	4	2	—		81	8
Clermont B	2013–14	CFA 2	4	2	—		—		—		4	2
Clermont B	2014–15	CFA 2	1	1	—		—		—		1	1
Clermont B	Total		5	3	—		—		—		5	3
Angers	2015–16	Ligue 1	28	4	2	0	1	0	—		31	4
Angers	2016–17	Ligue 1	32	2	2	1	1	1	—		35	4
Angers	2017–18	Ligue 1	28	2	1	0	1	0	—		30	2
Angers	2018–19	Ligue 1	26	3	1	0	1	0	—		28	3
Angers	2019–20	Ligue 1	24	1	3	2	0	0	—		27	3
Angers	2020–21	Ligue 1	35	3	4	0	—		—		39	3
Angers	2021–22	Ligue 1	30	0	1	0	—		—		31	0
Angers	2022–23	Ligue 1	26	0	1	0	—		—		27	0
Angers	2023–24	Ligue 2	37	5	2	0	—		—		39	5
Angers	Total		266	20	17	3	4	1	—		287	24
Angers B	2015–16	CFA 2	3	1	—		—		—		3	1
Angers B	2017–18	National 3	2	0	—		—		—		2	0
Angers B	2018–19	National 3	1	0	—		—		—		1	0
Angers B	Total		6	1	—		—		—		6	1
Career total			428	48	29	7	8	3	0	0	465	58

== Honours ==
Quevilly

- Coupe de France runner-up: 2011–12

Angers

- Coupe de France runner-up: 2016–17

Angers B

- Championnat National 3: 2018–19
