= Ismaël Traoré =

Association football player (born 1986)

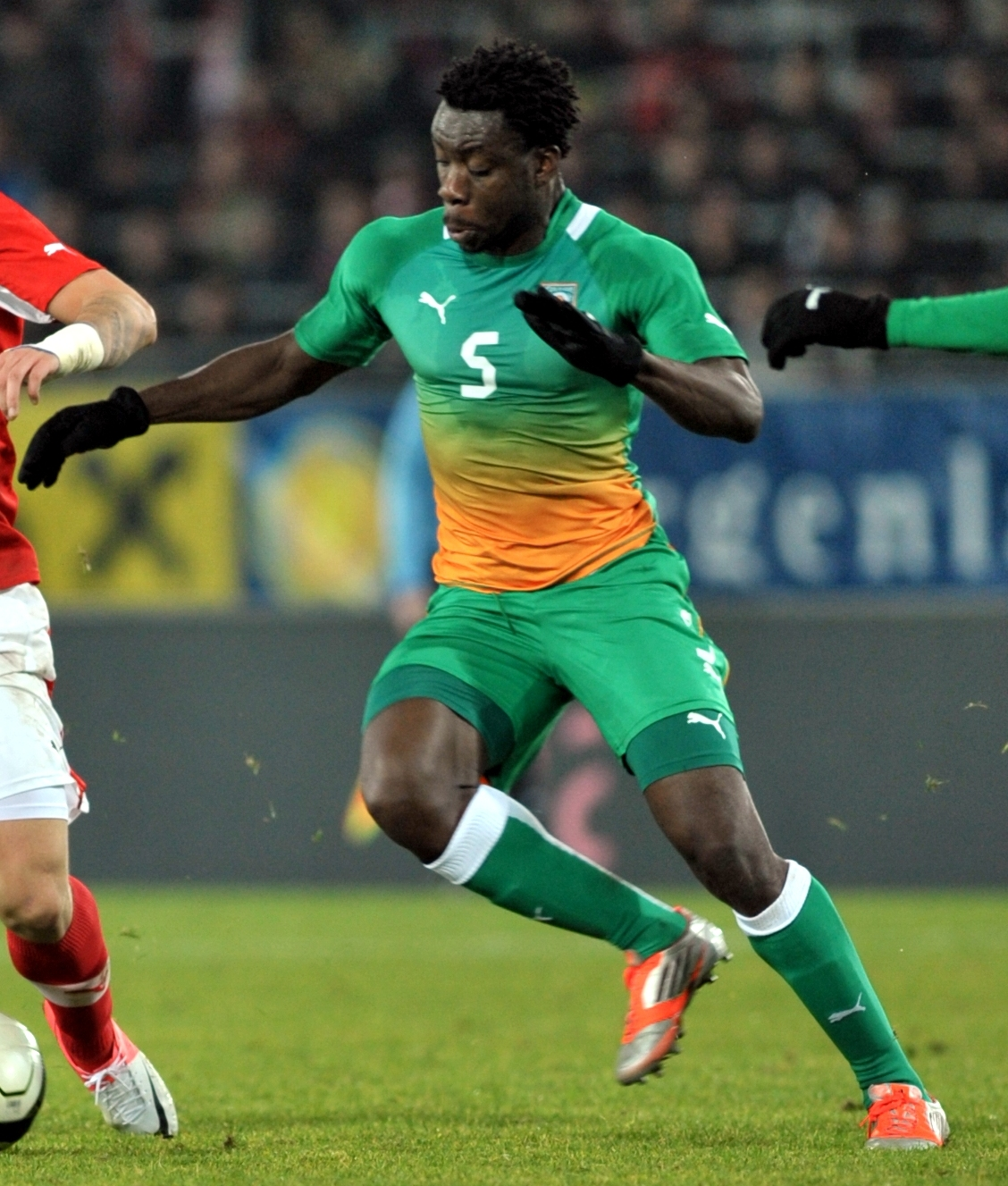
- Traoré with Ivory Coast in 2012

Personal information
- Full name: Ismaël Abdul Rahman Roch Traoré
- Date of birth: 18 August 1986 (age 40)
- Place of birth: Paris, France
- Height: 1.84 m (6 ft 0 in)
- Position: Centre-back

Senior career*
Years	Team	Apps	(Gls)
2006–2012	Sedan	154	(2)
2012–2015	Brest	83	(1)
2012	Brest B	1	(0)
2015–2022	Angers	222	(15)
2019	Angers B	1	(0)
2022–2025	Metz	77	(4)

International career
2012–2020	Ivory Coast	19	(0)
- * Club domestic league appearances and goals as of 11 May 2025

Ismaël Abdul Rahman Roch Traoré (born 18 August 1986) is a professional footballer who plays as a centre-back. Born in France, he played for the Ivory Coast national team from 2012 to 2020.

== Career statistics ==
=== Club ===
As of match played 10 May 2025

Appearances and goals by club, season and competition
Club	Season	League			Cup		League Cup		Other		Total	
Club	Season	Division	Apps	Goals	Apps	Goals	Apps	Goals	Apps	Goals	Apps	Goals
Sedan	2005–06	Ligue 2	0	0	1	0	–		–		1	0
Sedan	2007–08	Ligue 2	28	0	6	0	1	0	–		34	0
Sedan	2008–09	Ligue 2	24	1	3	0	1	0	–		28	1
Sedan	2009–10	Ligue 2	34	0	4	0	5	0	–		43	0
Sedan	2010–11	Ligue 2	34	0	1	0	1	0	–		36	0
Sedan	2011–12	Ligue 2	34	1	3	0	3	0	–		40	1
Sedan	Total		154	2	18	0	11	0	–		182	2
Brest	2012–13	Ligue 1	17	0	1	0	1	0	–		19	0
Brest	2013–14	Ligue 2	30	0	3	0	1	0	–		34	0
Brest	2014–15	Ligue 2	36	1	4	0	0	0	–		40	1
Brest	Total		83	1	8	0	2	0	–		93	1
Brest B	2012–13	National 3	1	0	–		–		–		1	0
Angers	2015–16	Ligue 1	34	1	2	1	0	0	–		36	2
Angers	2016–17	Ligue 1	32	1	3	0	0	0	–		35	1
Angers	2017–18	Ligue 1	32	3	0	0	0	0	–		32	3
Angers	2018–19	Ligue 1	30	3	1	0	0	0	–		31	3
Angers	2019–20	Ligue 1	23	0	0	0	0	0	–		23	0
Angers	2020–21	Ligue 1	34	3	0	0	–		–		34	3
Angers	2021–22	Ligue 1	37	4	0	0	–		–		37	4
Angers	Total		222	15	6	0	0	0	–		228	15
Angers B	2019–20	CFA 2	1	0	–		–		–		1	0
Metz	2022–23	Ligue 2	30	0	3	0	–		–		33	0
Metz	2023–24	Ligue 1	28	2	1	0	–		–		29	2
Metz	2024–25	Ligue 2	19	2	1	0	–		0	0	20	2
Metz	Total		77	4	5	0	–		0	0	82	4
Career total			538	22	37	1	13	0	0	0	587	23

=== International ===
Appearances and goals by national team and year
National team	Year	Apps	Goals
Ivory Coast	2012	1	0
Ivory Coast	2013	1	0
Ivory Coast	2014	0	0
Ivory Coast	2015	0	0
Ivory Coast	2016	0	0
Ivory Coast	2017	1	0
Ivory Coast	2018	0	0
Ivory Coast	2019	15	0
Ivory Coast	2020	1	0
Total		19	0
