= Alexandre Letellier =

French footballer (born 1990)

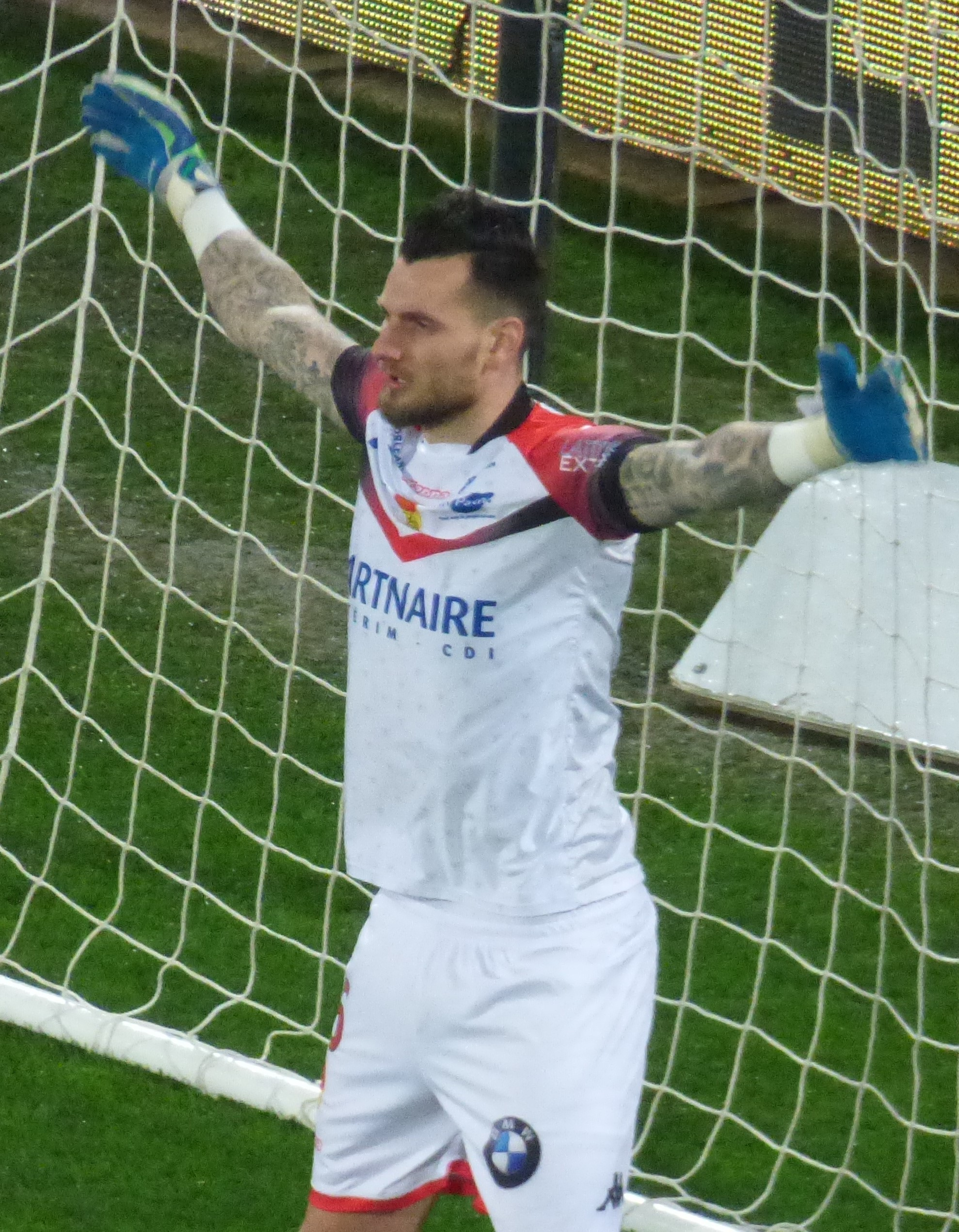
- Letellier with Orléans in 2020

Personal information
- Date of birth: 11 December 1990 (age 35)
- Place of birth: Paris, France
- Height: 1.93 m (6 ft 4 in)
- Position: Goalkeeper

Youth career
- 2000–2009: Paris Saint-Germain

Senior career*
Years	Team	Apps	(Gls)
2009–2010	Paris Saint-Germain B	14	(0)
2010–2020	Angers	47	(0)
2012–2018	Angers B	36	(0)
2018	→ Young Boys (loan)	1	(0)
2018–2019	→ Troyes (loan)	1	(0)
2019	→ Sarpsborg 08 (loan)	15	(0)
2020	Orléans	6	(0)
2020–2024	Paris Saint-Germain	2	(0)
Total		122	(0)
- * Club domestic league appearances and goals

Alexandre Letellier (born 11 December 1990) is a French former professional footballer who played as a goalkeeper.

== Career ==
=== Paris Saint-Germain ===
Born in Paris, Letellier began his career with Paris Saint-Germain (PSG), and made 14 league appearances for the reserve team during the 2009–10 campaign.

=== Angers ===
Letellier joined Angers in the summer of 2010, but failed to break into the first team in his first two years with the club. He made his professional debut in the 2–1 win over Nantes in the Coupe de la Ligue on 7 August 2012, and played his first Ligue 2 match for Angers later the same season, keeping a clean sheet in a 0–0 draw against Niort on 12 April 2013.

In January 2018, Letellier signed for Young Boys on loan until the end of the season. In the summer, would again be loaned out by Angers, this time to Troyes, and on a season-long loan. In July 2019, Letellier joined Eliteserien side Sarpsborg 08 on loan until the end of the year.

=== Orléans ===
On 27 January 2020, Letellier signed for Orléans. He went on to make a total of six appearances as the club was relegated from Ligue 2. He left on a free in the summer.

=== Return to Paris Saint-Germain ===
On 25 September 2020, Letellier returned to Paris Saint-Germain. He signed a contract with the club that would expire on 30 June 2021. On that date, he signed a contract extension to keep him at PSG for a further year.

On 21 May 2022, in the last matchday of the 2021–22 Ligue 1 season, Letellier came on as a substitute in a 5–0 win over Metz at the Parc des Princes, making his debut for PSG. In the process, he became the 484th player to play for Paris Saint-Germain's first team, and was awarded a Ligue 1 winner's medal. On 6 July 2022, it was announced that Letellier had signed a new two-year contract with the club. On 3 June 2023, Letellier once again came on as a substitute in the last match of the season, this time in a 3–2 defeat to Clermont at home, as PSG were crowned Ligue 1 champions.

On 13 October 2025, Letellier announced his retirement from professional football.

== Personal life ==
Letellier has two children with his wife Chloé.

In December 2023, Letellier's home in Hardricourt was burglarized by four robbers. They demanded valuables, and threatened the Letellier family at knifepoint. Letellier's wife Chloé was punched in the face by one of the robbers. After police arrived on the scene, three of the suspects were arrested, while the fourth was not caught. No family members required hospitalization.

== Career statistics ==
As of match played 3 June 2023

Appearances and goals by club, season and competition
Club	Season	League			National cup		League cup		Other		Total	
Club	Season	Division	Apps	Goals	Apps	Goals	Apps	Goals	Apps	Goals	Apps	Goals
Paris Saint-Germain B	2009–10	CFA	14	0	—		—		—		14	0
Angers	2010–11	Ligue 2	0	0	0	0	0	0	—		0	0
Angers	2011–12	Ligue 2	0	0	0	0	0	0	—		0	0
Angers	2012–13	Ligue 2	1	0	0	0	3	0	—		4	0
Angers	2013–14	Ligue 2	6	0	2	0	1	0	—		9	0
Angers	2014–15	Ligue 2	4	0	1	0	2	0	—		7	0
Angers	2015–16	Ligue 1	17	0	1	0	1	0	—		19	0
Angers	2016–17	Ligue 1	6	0	3	0	0	0	—		9	0
Angers	2017–18	Ligue 1	13	0	0	0	1	0	—		14	0
Angers	Total		47	0	7	0	8	0	—		62	0
Angers B	2012–13	CFA 2	9	0	—		—		—		9	0
Angers B	2013–14	CFA 2	10	0	—		—		—		10	0
Angers B	2014–15	CFA 2	7	0	—		—		—		7	0
Angers B	2015–16	CFA 2	4	0	—		—		—		4	0
Angers B	2016–17	CFA 2	5	0	—		—		—		5	0
Angers B	2017–18	National 3	1	0	—		—		—		1	0
Angers B	Total		36	0	—		—		—		36	0
Young Boys (loan)	2017–18	Swiss Super League	1	0	0	0	—		—		1	0
Troyes (loan)	2018–19	Ligue 2	1	0	1	0	3	0	—		5	0
Sarpsborg 08 (loan)	2019	Eliteserien	15	0	0	0	—		—		15	0
Orléans	2019–20	Ligue 2	6	0	0	0	0	0	—		6	0
Paris Saint-Germain	2020–21	Ligue 1	0	0	0	0	—		0	0	0	0
Paris Saint-Germain	2021–22	Ligue 1	1	0	0	0	—		0	0	1	0
Paris Saint-Germain	2022–23	Ligue 1	1	0	0	0	—		0	0	1	0
Paris Saint-Germain	2023–24	Ligue 1	0	0	0	0	—		0	0	0	0
Paris Saint-Germain	Total		2	0	0	0	—		0	0	2	0
Career total			122	0	8	0	11	0	0	0	141	0

== Honours ==
Angers

- Coupe de France runner-up: 2016–17

Young Boys

- Swiss Super League: 2017–18
- Swiss Cup runner-up: 2017–18

Paris Saint-Germain

- Ligue 1: 2021–22, 2022–23
