= Romain Saïss =

Moroccan footballer (born 1990)

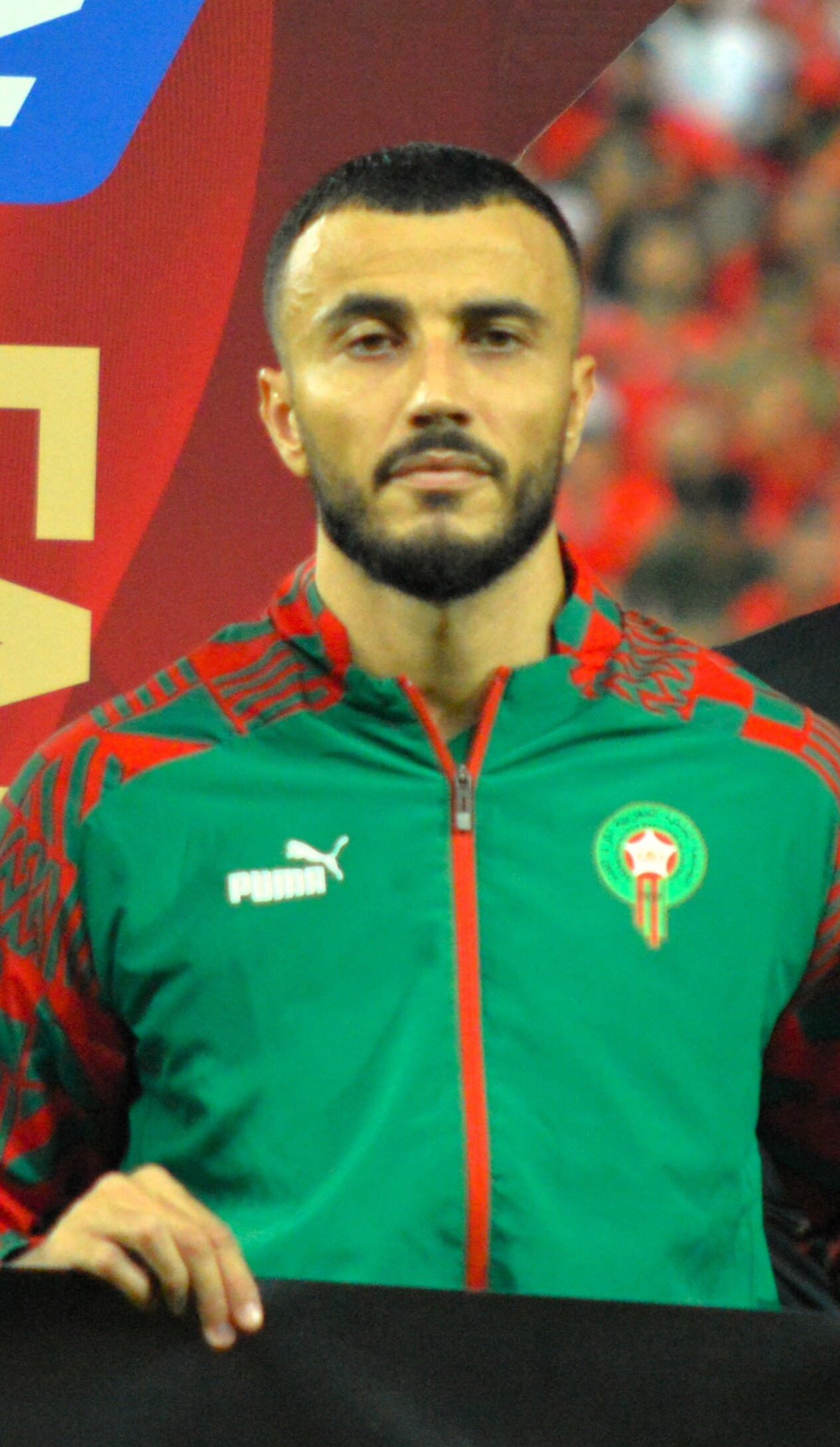
- Saïss with Morocco in 2023

Personal information
- Full name: Romain Ghanem Paul Saïss
- Date of birth: 26 March 1990 (age 36)
- Place of birth: Bourg-de-Péage, France
- Height: 1.90 m (6 ft 3 in)
- Positions: Centre-back; defensive midfielder

Youth career
- 1995–2000: USBS Epône
- 2000–2004: FC Mantois
- 2004–2010: Valence

Senior career*
Years	Team	Apps	(Gls)
2010–2011	Valence	13	(4)
2011–2013	Clermont	48	(1)
2013–2015	Le Havre	61	(3)
2015–2016	Angers	35	(2)
2016–2022	Wolverhampton Wanderers	176	(13)
2022–2023	Beşiktaş	25	(1)
2023–2026	Al Sadd	11	(1)
2023–2024	→ Al-Shabab (loan)	25	(4)

International career
2012–2025	Morocco	86	(3)
Medal record
Men's football
Representing Morocco
Africa Cup of Nations
Winner	2025 Morocco
- * Club domestic league appearances and goals as of 22 November 2025 (UTC)

Romain Ghanem Paul Saïss (Arabic: رومان غانم بول سايس; born 26 March 1990) is a professional footballer who plays as a centre-back or defensive midfielder.

Saïss began his career with Valence, then played for Le Havre and Clermont of Ligue 2, and Angers of Ligue 1 before joining Wolverhampton Wanderers in 2016. He made 206 appearances and scored 15 goals for the club, before moving to Beşiktaş in 2022.

Born in France, Saïss holds both French and Moroccan nationalities. He made his senior debut for the Morocco national team in November 2012, and went on to represent the nation at five Africa Cup of Nations tournaments and two FIFA World Cups, winning the 2025 Africa Cup of Nations.

== Club career ==
=== Early career ===
Saïss began his senior career with Valence in the Championnat de France Amateur 2 (fifth-tier), and supplemented his €500 monthly salary with washing up at his parents' restaurant. At 21, he signed his first professional contract with Clermont in Ligue 2.

In June 2013, Saïss moved across Ligue 2 to Le Havre on a two-year deal. When it ended, he joined Ligue 1 side Angers on a two-year contract.

=== Wolverhampton Wanderers ===
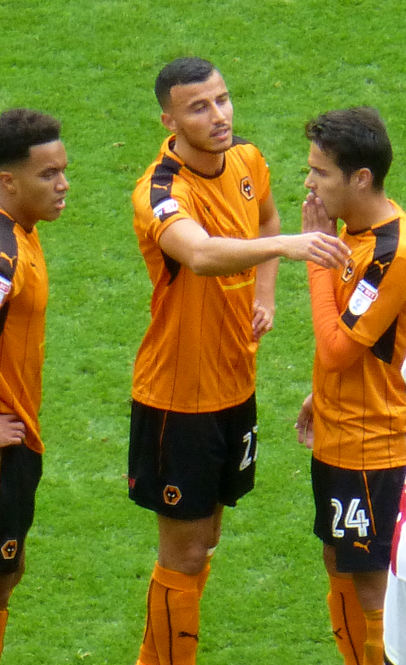
Saïss (centre) with Wolverhampton Wanderers in 2016

On 30 August 2016, Saïss moved to England, joining EFL Championship club Wolverhampton Wanderers for an undisclosed fee on a four-year deal. He made his debut on 17 September in a 2–0 win at Newcastle United. In the game, he was subjected to racial abuse by opponent Jonjo Shelvey, who was given a five-match ban and £100,000 fine by The FA in December.

He scored his first goal for the club on 30 September 2017 in a 4–0 win against Burton Albion.

Following Wolves' promotion to the Premier League in 2018, Saïss made his debut Premier League appearance as a substitute in a 1–1 draw with Manchester United at Old Trafford on 22 September 2018. His first start in the Premier League came in a 2–1 defeat away to Cardiff City at the Cardiff City Stadium on 30 November. He scored his first Premier League goal in a 1–1 draw with Fulham at Craven Cottage on 26 December 2018. On 21 February 2019, he agreed a new contract with the club until the summer of 2021.

On 25 July 2019, Saïss made his debut appearance in UEFA European club football competition as a late substitute in Wolves's 2–0 home win against Crusaders in the 2019–20 UEFA Europa League Second Qualifying Round and on 24 October he scored his first goal in such a competition when he scored the opening goal of a 2–1 away win at Slovan Bratislava in the 2019–20 UEFA Europa League group stage.

Saïss triggered an automatic one-year extension to his contract on 18 March 2021, by making 20 starts in the Premier League during the 2020–21 season, keeping him with the club until June 2022. He was described as the "Moroccan Maldini" by head coach Bruno Lage on 15 December that year, after his impressive display in the away Premier League draw at Brighton & Hove Albion, where he scored the only goal in a much longed-for win (Wolves's first-ever win at Brighton in the top-flight in seven attempts dating back to 1979). He made his 100th appearance in the Premier League in 2–0 win away to Tottenham Hotspur on 13 February 2022. His 200th competitive appearance in all competitions for Wolves was on 5 March 2022 in a home fixture against Crystal Palace.

On 31 May 2022, Saïss announced that he would leave Wolves when his contract would expire in the summer, having played 206 games for the club over six seasons, and scoring 15 goals, nine of them in the Premier League.

=== Beşiktaş ===
On 14 June 2022, Saïss moved to Turkey, signing a two-year contract with Süper Lig club Beşiktaş. He made his debut on 6 August as the season began with a 1–0 home win over Kayserispor.

=== Al Sadd ===
On 24 July 2023, Saïss signed a two-year contract with Qatar Stars League club Al Sadd, for a reported fee of €2.5 million, which could rise to €2.8 million with add-ons.

On 5 September 2023, after making three appearances for Al Sadd, he was sent on a season-long loan to Saudi Pro League club Al-Shabab.

== International career ==
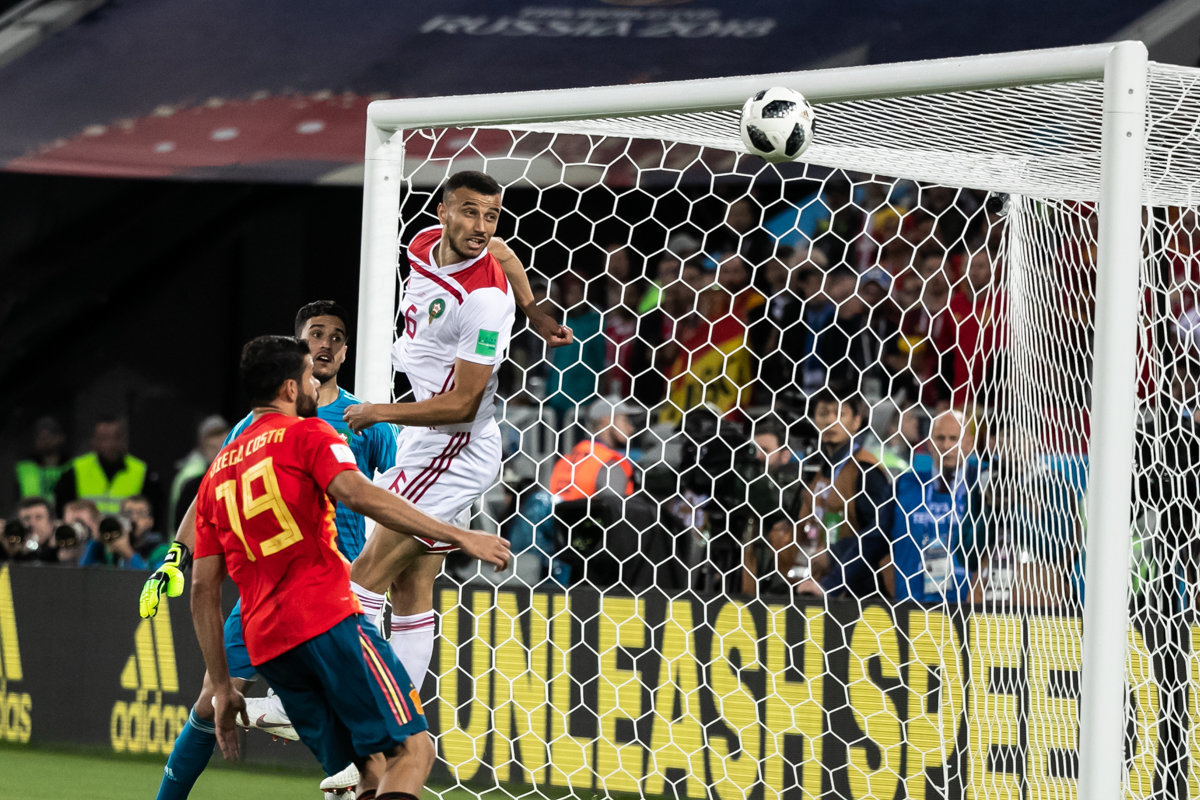
Saïss (in white) defending against Spain at the 2018 FIFA World Cup

Saïss, who was born and raised in France to a Moroccan father and a French mother, chose to represent the Morocco national team. He made his debut in a 1–0 friendly loss to Togo in November 2012.

Saïss was in the Moroccan squad that reached the quarter-finals of the 2017 Africa Cup of Nations in Gabon. He scored his first international goal in their 3–1 group win over Togo. In June 2018, he was named in Morocco's 23-man squad for the 2018 FIFA World Cup in Russia, and featured in group games against Iran and Spain. After the 2019 Africa Cup of Nations, in which Morocco made the last 16, Saïss became the captain of the Atlas Lions.

On 10 November 2022, Saïss was named in Morocco's 26-man squad for the 2022 FIFA World Cup in Qatar. He scored the opening goal of a 2–0 group stage victory over Belgium on 27 November, Morocco's first goal of the tournament. The goal had previously been awarded to Abdelhamid Sabiri, but Saïss was later credited for the goal by FIFA. In the semi-final against France – the first ever played by an African nation – he was substituted after 21 minutes due to injury as Morocco lost 2–0.

On 28 December 2023, Saïss was amongst the 27 players selected by coach Walid Regragui to represent Morocco in the 2023 Africa Cup of Nations.

On 11 December 2025, Saïss was called up to the Morocco squad for the 2025 Africa Cup of Nations, a tournament Morocco eventually won. On 24 February 2026, he announced his retirement from international football.

== Personal life ==
Saïss's father is Moroccan and his mother is French, both restaurant owners. He is a Muslim and observes fasting in the month of Ramadan.

== Career statistics ==
=== Club ===
As of match played 25 November 2025

Appearances and goals by club, season and competition
Club	Season	League			National cup (Note: Includes Coupe de France, FA Cup, Turkish Cup, King's Cup)		League cup (Note: Includes Coupe de la Ligue, EFL Cup)		Continental		Other		Total	
Club	Season	Division	Apps	Goals	Apps	Goals	Apps	Goals	Apps	Goals	Apps	Goals	Apps	Goals
Valence	2010–11	CFA 2	13	4	0	0	—		—		—		13	4
Clermont	2011–12	Ligue 2	17	1	1	0	0	0	—		—		18	1
Clermont	2012–13	Ligue 2	31	0	0	0	2	0	—		—		33	0
Clermont	Total		48	1	1	0	2	0	—		—		51	1
Clermont B	2012–13	CFA 2	1	0	—		—		—		—		1	0
Le Havre	2013–14	Ligue 2	27	1	0	0	1	0	—		—		28	1
Le Havre	2014–15	Ligue 2	34	2	1	0	1	0	—		—		36	2
Le Havre	Total		61	3	1	0	2	0	—		—		64	3
Angers	2015–16	Ligue 1	35	2	1	0	1	0	—		—		37	2
Wolverhampton Wanderers	2016–17	Championship	24	0	1	0	0	0	—		—		25	0
Wolverhampton Wanderers	2017–18	Championship	42	4	1	0	1	0	—		—		44	4
Wolverhampton Wanderers	2018–19	Premier League	19	2	5	0	2	0	—		—		26	2
Wolverhampton Wanderers	2019–20	Premier League	33	2	2	0	0	0	14 (Note: Appearances in UEFA Europa League)	1	—		49	3
Wolverhampton Wanderers	2020–21	Premier League	27	3	2	0	1	0	—		—		30	3
Wolverhampton Wanderers	2021–22	Premier League	31	2	0	0	1	1	—		—		32	3
Wolverhampton Wanderers	Total		176	13	11	0	5	1	14	1	—		206	15
Beşiktaş	2022–23	Süper Lig	25	1	1	0	—		—		—		26	1
Al Sadd	2023–24	Qatar Stars League	0	0	—		—		—		3 (Note: Appearances in Arab Club Champions Cup)	0	3	0
Al Sadd	2024–25	Qatar Stars League	5	1	0	0	0	0	6 (Note: Appearances in AFC Champions League Elite)	1	—		11	2
Al Sadd	2025–26	Qatar Stars League	6	0	0	0	0	0	4	0	—		10	0
Al Sadd	Total		11	1	0	0	0	0	10	1	3	0	24	2
Al-Shabab (loan)	2023–24	Saudi Pro League	25	4	3	0	—		—		—		28	4
Career total			382	29	18	0	10	1	24	2	3	0	437	32

=== International ===
As of match played 21 December 2025

Appearances and goals by national team and year
National team	Year	Apps	Goals
Morocco	2012	1	0
Morocco	2016	7	0
Morocco	2017	13	1
Morocco	2018	11	0
Morocco	2019	9	0
Morocco	2020	3	0
Morocco	2021	9	0
Morocco	2022	19	1
Morocco	2023	7	0
Morocco	2024	4	1
Morocco	2025	3	0
Total		86	3

Scores and results list Morocco's goal tally first, score column indicates score after each Saïss goal.

List of international goals scored by Romain Saïss
No.	Date	Venue	Opponent	Score	Result	Competition
1	20 January 2017	Stade d'Oyem, Oyem, Gabon	Togo	2–1	3–1	2017 Africa Cup of Nations
2	27 November 2022	Al Thumama Stadium, Doha, Qatar	Belgium	1–0	2–0	2022 FIFA World Cup
3	17 January 2024	Laurent Pokou Stadium, San-Pédro, Ivory Coast	Tanzania	1–0	3–0	2023 Africa Cup of Nations

== Honours ==
Wolverhampton Wanderers

- EFL Championship: 2017–18

Al Sadd

- Qatar Stars League: 2024–25, 2025–26
- Qatar Cup: 2025
- UAE-Qatar Challenge Cup: 2026

Morocco

- Africa Cup of Nations: 2025

Individual

- Angers Player of the Season: 2015–16
- IFFHS Africa Team of the Year: 2022

Orders

- Order of the Throne: 2022
