= Famara Diédhiou =

Senegalese footballer

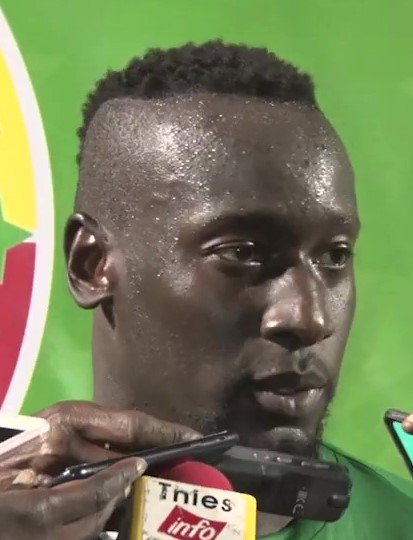
- Diédhiou in 2019

Personal information
- Full name: Famara Diédhiou
- Date of birth: 15 December 1992 (age 33)
- Place of birth: Saint-Louis, Senegal
- Height: 1.92 m (6 ft 4 in)
- Position: Striker

Senior career*
Years	Team	Apps	(Gls)
2012	ASM Belfort	11	(3)
2012–2013	Épinal	30	(12)
2013–2014	Gazélec Ajaccio	33	(13)
2014–2016	Sochaux	13	(1)
2014–2016	→ Clermont (loan)	50	(23)
2016–2017	Angers	31	(8)
2017–2021	Bristol City	169	(51)
2021–2023	Alanyaspor	28	(11)
2023	→ Granada (loan)	10	(0)
2023–2024	Granada	8	(0)
2024	→ Cardiff City (loan)	16	(2)
2024–2026	Clermont	47	(14)

International career^{‡}
2014–2022	Senegal	27	(11)
Medal record
Men's football
Representing Senegal
Africa Cup of Nations
Winner	2021 Cameroon
- * Club domestic league appearances and goals as of 12 May 2026 ‡ National team caps and goals as of 21:10, 5 December 2022 (UTC)

Famara Diédhiou (born 15 December 1992) is a Senegalese professional footballer who plays as a striker.

== Club career ==
=== Sochaux ===
Diédhiou joined FC Sochaux-Montbéliard in 2014 from Gazélec Ajaccio. He made his Ligue 2 debut at 2 August 2014 against US Orléans playing the full game in a 0–1 home defeat on the opening day of the 2014–15 season. On 22 August 2014, he scored his first Ligue 2 goal against AC Arles-Avignon.

==== Loan to Clermont ====
On 2 February 2015, Diédhiou joined Clermont Foot on loan from Sochaux. For the 2015–16 Ligue 2 season, he went back on loan to Clermont again. In that season, he scored 22 goals in 37 matches.

=== Angers ===
In summer 2016, he moved up a tier joining Ligue 1 club Angers SCO who paid Sochaux a transfer fee of £1.36 million. In 2016–17, his only season at the club, he played 35 times scoring 9 goals.

=== Bristol City ===
On 28 June 2017, Diédhiou signed a four-year contract with English Championship club Bristol City for a club record transfer fee of £5.3 million. He scored on his debut for Bristol City in a 3–1 win over Barnsley on 5 August 2017. During the 2017–18 season Bristol City reached the semi-finals of the EFL Cup, with Diédhiou scoring in the 2—0 upset against Premier League opponents Stoke City in the third round.

In his first season at the club scoring 14 goals in 36 appearances in all competitions, finishing the club's 2nd top scorer behind Bobby Reid for Bristol City. In May 2018 he received a six-match ban due to a spitting incident in a match against Birmingham City in April 2018. Diédhiou denied the charges, leading the club to appeal the ban on 21 June 2018. Bristol City appealed the 6 match ban, however the decision was upheld on 14 July 2018, meaning Diédhiou was suspended for the opening six matches of the 2018–19 season.

During the 2018/19 season, he scored 13 league goals for the second consecutive season and finished as Bristol City's top scorer with 13 goals in all competitions.

On 23 February 2021, Diédhiou scored a brace at the Riverside Stadium against Middlesbrough F.C. to surpass 50 goals for the club in a 3–1 away victory.

=== Alanyaspor ===
On 19 July 2021, Diédhiou signed a four-year contract with Turkish club Alanyaspor.

=== Granada ===
On 24 January 2023, Diédhiou joined Segunda División club Granada CF on loan until the end of the season with the option to buy, which was activated after the club's promotion to La Liga.

== International career ==
Diédhiou scored his first goal for Senegal in a 2–0 win over Namibia that ensured the nation's qualification for the 2017 Africa Cup of Nations. He made one appearance at the final tournament, appearing as a substitute in the group match against Algeria on 23 January 2017.

He was part of Senegal's squad for the 2021 Africa Cup of Nations, scoring once in the quarter-final win over Equatorial Guinea, as the Lions of Teranga went on to win the tournament for the first time in their history.

He was appointed a Grand Officer of the National Order of the Lion by President of Senegal Macky Sall following the nation's victory at the tournament.

Diédhiou appeared in two of Senegal's matches at the 2022 FIFA World Cup, scoring in a 3–1 win over hosts Qatar, as the nation reached the round of 16 for the first time since its debut in 2002.

In December 2023, he was named in Senegal's squad for the postponed 2023 Africa Cup of Nations held in the Ivory Coast.

== Career statistics ==
=== Club ===
As of match played 21 April 2021

Appearances and goals by club, season and competition
Club	Season	League			National Cup		League Cup		Other		Total	
Club	Season	Division	Apps	Goals	Apps	Goals	Apps	Goals	Apps	Goals	Apps	Goals
ASM Belfort	2011–12	CFA	11	3	0	0	0	0	—		11	3
Épinal	2012–13	Championnat National	30	12	4	1	0	0	—		34	13
Gazélec Ajaccio	2013–14	Championnat National	33	13	0	0	1	0	—		34	13
Sochaux	2014–15	Ligue 2	13	1	1	0	1	0	—		15	1
Sochaux B	2014–15	CFA	5	3	—		—		—		5	3
Clermont (loan)	2014–15	Ligue 2	14	2	—		—		—		14	2
Clermont (loan)	2015–16	Ligue 2	36	21	0	0	1	1	—		37	22
Clermont (loan)	Total		50	23	0	0	1	1	0	0	51	24
Angers	2016–17	Ligue 1	31	8	4	1	1	0	—		36	9
Bristol City	2017–18	Championship	32	13	0	0	4	1	—		36	14
Bristol City	2018–19	Championship	41	13	3	0	0	0	—		44	13
Bristol City	2019–20	Championship	41	12	2	1	1	1	—		44	14
Bristol City	2020–21	Championship	40	8	3	2	2	0	—		45	10
Bristol City	Total		154	46	8	3	7	2	—		169	51
Career total			327	109	17	5	11	3	—		355	117

=== International ===
Scores and results list Senegal's goal tally first, score column indicates score after each Diédhiou goal.

List of international goals scored by Famara Diédhiou
No.	Date	Venue	Opponent	Score	Result	Competition
1	3 September 2016	Stade Léopold Sédar Senghor, Dakar, Senegal	Namibia	2–0	2–0	2017 Africa Cup of Nations qualification
2	10 October 2019	Singapore National Stadium, Kallang, Singapore	Brazil	1–1	1–1	Friendly
3	17 November 2019	Mavuso Sports Centre, Manzini, Eswatini	Eswatini	1–0	4–1	2021 Africa Cup of Nations qualification
4	17 November 2019	Mavuso Sports Centre, Manzini, Eswatini	Eswatini	2–0	4–1	2021 Africa Cup of Nations qualification
5	17 November 2019	Mavuso Sports Centre, Manzini, Eswatini	Eswatini	3–0	4–1	2021 Africa Cup of Nations qualification
6	9 October 2021	Stade Lat-Dior, Thiès, Senegal	Namibia	2–0	4–1	2022 FIFA World Cup qualification
7	12 October 2021	Orlando Stadium, Johannesburg, South Africa	Namibia	1–0	3–1	2022 FIFA World Cup qualification
8	12 October 2021	Orlando Stadium, Johannesburg, South Africa	Namibia	2–1	3–1	2022 FIFA World Cup qualification
9	12 October 2021	Orlando Stadium, Johannesburg, South Africa	Namibia	3–1	3–1	2022 FIFA World Cup qualification
10	30 January 2022	Ahmadou Ahidjo Stadium, Yaoundé, Cameroon	Equatorial Guinea	1–0	3–1	2021 Africa Cup of Nations
11	25 November 2022	Al Thumama Stadium, Doha, Qatar	Qatar	2–0	3–1	2022 FIFA World Cup

== Honours ==
Granada

- Segunda División: 2022–23

Senegal

- Africa Cup of Nations: 2021

Individual

- Bristol City Player of the Year: 2019–20
- Grand Officer of the National Order of the Lion: 2022
