= Vincent Manceau =

French footballer (born 1989)

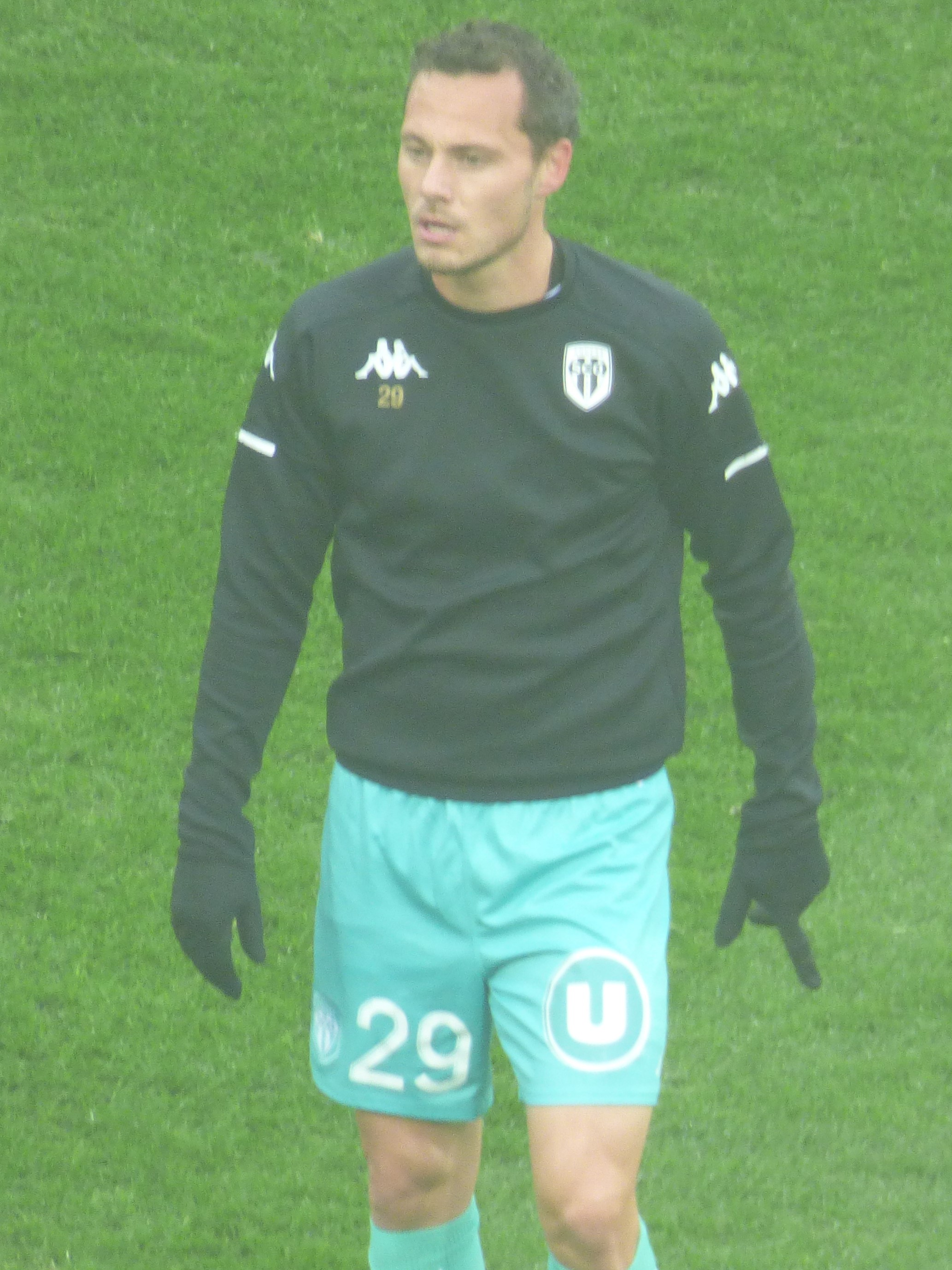
- Manceau with Angers in 2020

Personal information
- Date of birth: 10 July 1989 (age 37)
- Place of birth: Angers, France
- Height: 1.74 m (5 ft 9 in)
- Position: Right-back

Team information
- Current team: Saumur
- Number: 25

Youth career
- 1995–2008: Angers

Senior career*
Years	Team	Apps	(Gls)
2008–2022	Angers	356	(4)
2012–2015	Angers B	7	(1)
2022–2024	Guingamp	39	(0)
2024–	Saumur	9	(1)
- * Club domestic league appearances and goals as of 7 December 2024

Vincent Manceau (born 10 July 1989) is a French professional footballer who plays as a right-back for Championnat National 1 club Saumur.

== Career ==
Born in Angers, Manceau has played for Angers SCO since he was 6 in 1995. He started his professional career as a defensive midfielder, later being moved the full-back position. In June 2016, he agreed a contract extension until 2020 with the club.

On 21 July 2022, Manceau signed a contract with Guingamp for two years with an option for a third year.

== Career statistics ==
As of match played 21 July 2022

Appearances and goals by club, season and competition
Club	Season	League			National cup		League cup		Total	
Club	Season	Division	Apps	Goals	Apps	Goals	Apps	Goals	Apps	Goals
Angers	2008–09	Ligue 2	4	0	0	0	0	0	4	0
Angers	2009–10	Ligue 2	8	0	0	0	0	0	8	0
Angers	2010–11	Ligue 2	29	0	2	0	0	0	31	0
Angers	2011–12	Ligue 2	23	0	1	0	1	0	25	0
Angers	2012–13	Ligue 2	29	1	0	0	2	0	31	1
Angers	2013–14	Ligue 2	29	0	5	0	1	0	35	0
Angers	2014–15	Ligue 2	33	1	0	0	2	0	35	1
Angers	2015–16	Ligue 1	27	0	1	0	0	0	28	0
Angers	2016–17	Ligue 1	33	1	5	0	0	0	38	1
Angers	2017–18	Ligue 1	33	0	1	0	1	0	35	0
Angers	2018–19	Ligue 1	31	1	1	0	1	0	33	1
Angers	2019–20	Ligue 1	22	0	3	0	0	0	25	0
Angers	2020–21	Ligue 1	27	0	3	1	0	0	31	0
Angers	2021–22	Ligue 1	28	0	1	0	0	0	29	0
Angers	Total		356	4	23	1	8	0	387	5
Angers II	2012–13	Championnat National 3	1	0	0	0	0	0	1	0
Angers II	2013–14	Championnat National 3	4	1	0	0	0	0	4	1
Angers II	2014–15	Championnat National 3	2	0	0	0	0	0	2	0
Angers II	Total		7	1	0	0	0	0	7	1
Guingamp	2022–23	Ligue 2	0	0	0	0	0	0	0	0
Career total			363	5	23	1	8	0	394	6

== Honours ==
Angers

- Coupe de France runner-up: 2016–17
