= Yoann Bourillon =

French footballer (born 1982)

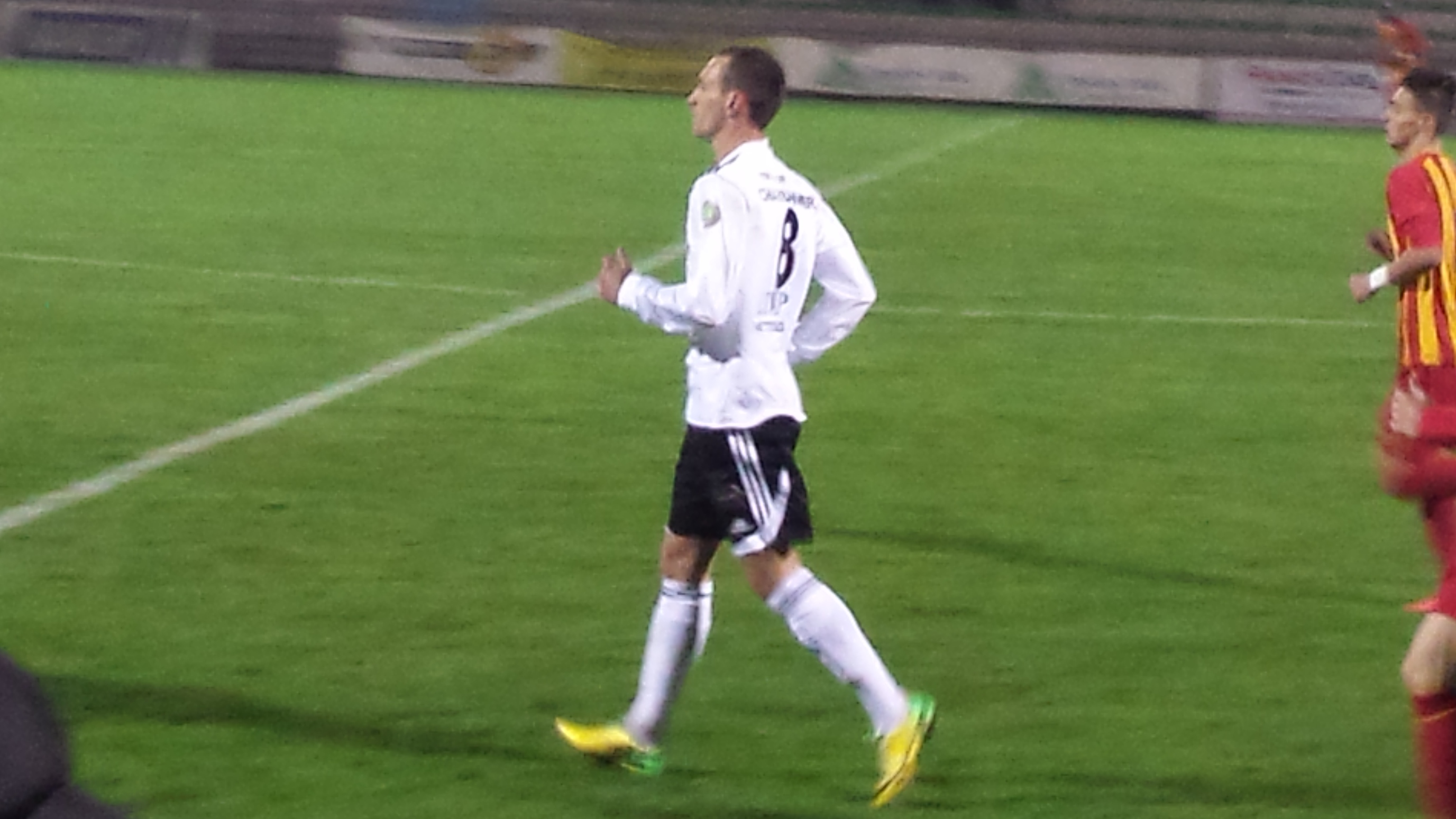
- Bourillon in 2014

Personal information
- Date of birth: 9 August 1982 (age 44)
- Place of birth: Laval, France
- Height: 1.81 m (5 ft 11 in)
- Position: Midfielder

Senior career*
Years	Team	Apps	(Gls)
2000–2005	Laval	78	(7)
2005–2009	Racing Besançon	68	(9)
2009–2010	Avranches	32	(1)
2010–2012	La Vitréenne	45	(1)
2012–2015	Romorantin	84	(14)
2015–2017	Stade Briochin	17	(1)
Total		324	(33)
- * Club domestic league appearances and goals

Yoann Bourillon (born 9 January 1982) is a French former professional footballer who played as a midfielder.

== Career ==
Bourillon was born in Laval. He played nearly 80 games professionally for Laval in Ligue 2, and for four seasons in Championnat de France Amateur with Racing Besançon. When Racing Besançon were relegated to CFA 2 for financial reasons, he signed for fellow CFA club US Avranches.

In 2010 Bourillon signed for another CFA side La Vitréenne, where he played for two seasons, with the team being relegated to CFA 2 at the end of the 2011–12 season. in June 2012 he signed for a fourth CFA side, Romorantin.

In June 2015, Bourillon joined Stade Briochin to work again with coach Sylvain Didot, with whom he had previously worked at Avranches.

== Personal life ==
His younger brother Grégory Bourillon is also a professional footballer.
