= Slimane Sissoko =

French professional footballer (born 1991)

Personal information
- Date of birth: 20 March 1991 (age 35)
- Place of birth: Créteil, France
- Height: 1.90 m (6 ft 3 in)
- Position: Striker

Youth career
- 2008–2011: Rennes

Senior career*
| Years | Team | Apps | (Gls) |
| 2010–2011 | Rennes B | 13 | (1) |
| 2013–2014 | Boulogne | 4 | (0) |
| 2014 | Sainte-Geneviève | 7 | (2) |
| 2015 | Luçon | 9 | (8) |
| 2015–2016 | Angers | 13 | (0) |
| 2016–2017 | Nîmes | 12 | (3) |
- * Club domestic league appearances and goals as of 24 November 2017

Slimane Sissoko (born 20 March 1991) is a French professional footballer who last played as a striker for Nîmes.

== Club career ==
Sissoko is a youth product of Rennes, though he was never offered a spot in the club's first team. After making his debut in the French lower divisions, he joined Angers in 2015. He made his full professional debut a few weeks later, in a 2–0 Ligue 1 victory against Montpellier, where he made the assist for Gilles Sunu on the second goal of the game.

== Personal life ==
Born in France, Sissoko is of Malian descent.
