= Olivier Auriac =

French footballer (born 1983)

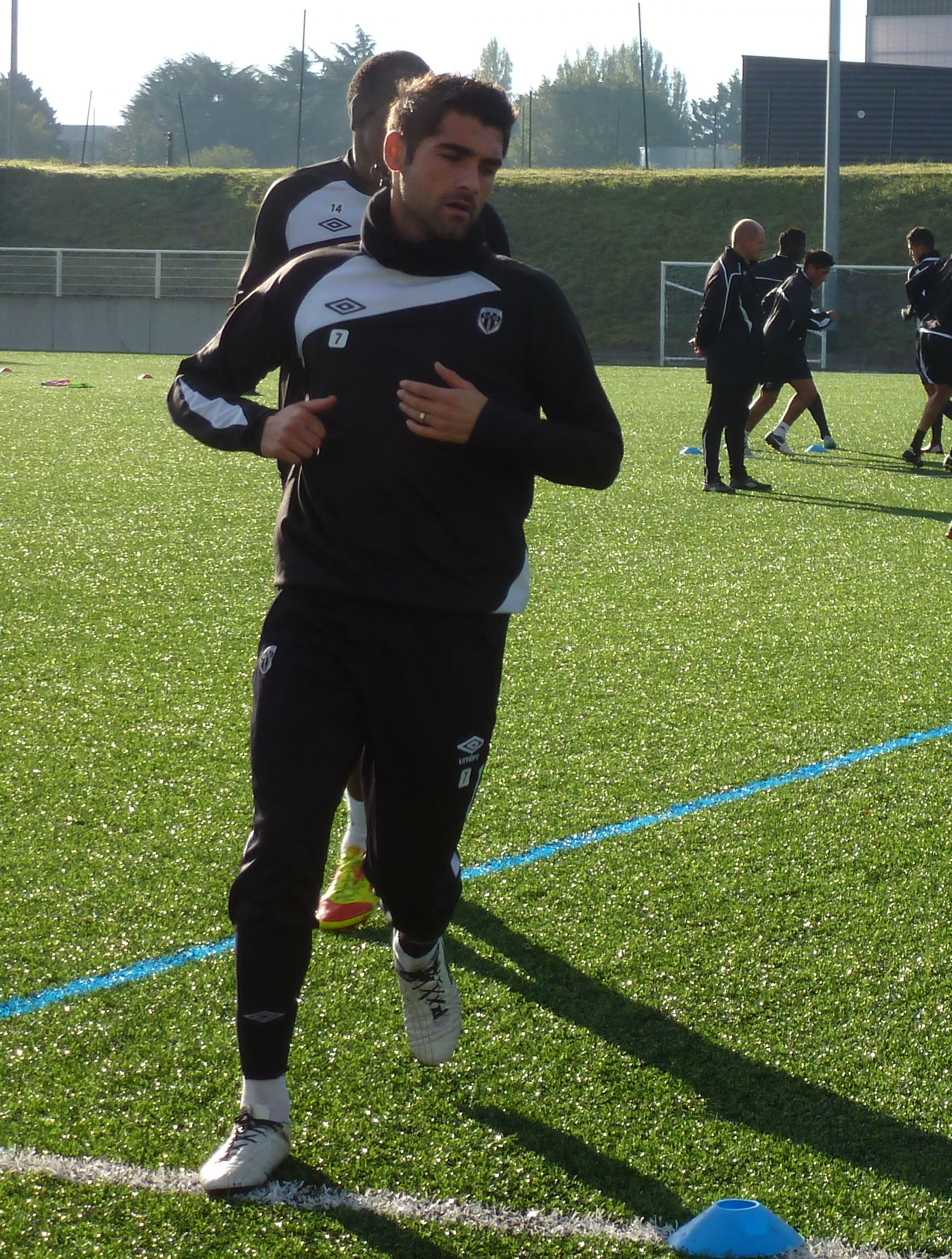

Personal information
- Full name: Olivier Auriac
- Date of birth: 14 September 1983 (age 43)
- Place of birth: Saint-Georges-de-Didonne, France
- Height: 1.72 m (5 ft 8 in)
- Position: Midfielder

Youth career
- 1991–1997: Royan OCF
- 1997–1998: US Saintes
- 1998–2001: Girondins de Bordeaux

Senior career*
Years	Team	Apps	(Gls)
2001–2003	Girondins de Bordeaux	9	(0)
2003–2007	Stade Brestois	112	(5)
2007–2016	Angers	242	(11)

International career
2004	France U21	1	(0)
- * Club domestic league appearances and goals

Olivier Auriac (born 14 September 1983) is a retired French professional footballer who played as a midfielder.

== Career ==
In May 2016, it was announced that Auriac would retire at the end of the 2015–16 season. Having joined Angers in 2007, he captained the team and played a total of 267 matches for the club.
