= Charles Diers =

French footballer (born 1981)

Personal information
- Date of birth: 6 June 1981 (age 45)
- Place of birth: Cambrai, France
- Height: 1.85 m (6 ft 1 in)
- Position: Midfielder

Senior career*
Years	Team	Apps	(Gls)
1997–1998	Cambrai	29	(9)
1998–2002	Lille B	81	(13)
2002–2006	Dijon	84	(14)
2005–2006	→ Boulogne (loan)	34	(7)
2006–2008	Clermont Foot	63	(18)
2008–2016	Angers	215	(25)
Total		506	(86)
- * Club domestic league appearances and goals

Charles Diers (born 6 June 1981) is a French former professional footballer who played as a midfielder.

== Career ==
In May 2016, it was announced that Diers would retire at the end of the 2015–16 season. Having joined Angers in 2008, he played a total of 266 matches for the club.
