= Yohann Eudeline =

French footballer (born 1982)

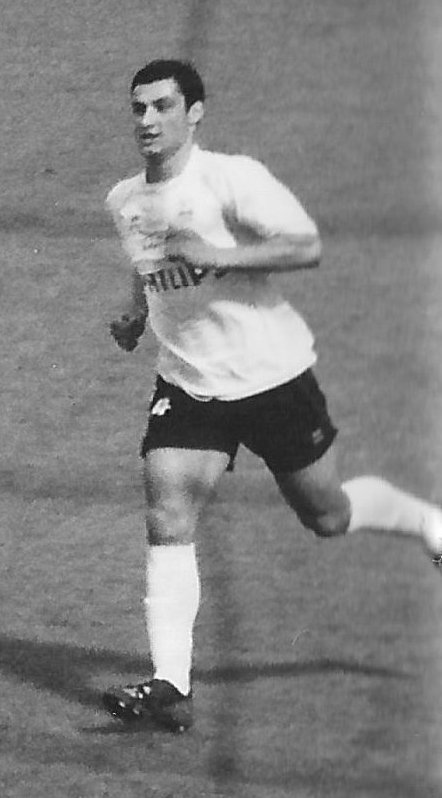

Personal information
- Date of birth: 23 June 1982 (age 44)
- Place of birth: Caen, France
- Height: 1.82 m (6 ft 0 in)
- Position: Striker

Senior career*
Years	Team	Apps	(Gls)
2001–2003	USON Mondeville	51	(7)
2003–2006	Caen	74	(8)
2006–2008	Guingamp	44	(0)
2008–2012	Sedan	115	(20)
2012–2014	Nantes	34	(4)
2013	Nantes B	6	(1)
2014–2015	Angers	28	(1)
Total		352	(41)
- * Club domestic league appearances and goals

Yohann Eudeline (born 23 June 1982) is a French former professional footballer who played as a striker. On 11 May 2019, he was named director of recruitment of Stade Malherbe Caen.

== Personal life ==
His father Jacques Eudeline played in Ligue 2 for Stade Malherbe Caen.
