= Guy Ngosso =

Cameroonian footballer

Personal information
- Full name: Guy Adolphe Ndosso Massouma
- Date of birth: 11 January 1985 (age 41)
- Place of birth: Douala, Cameroon
- Height: 1.85 m (6 ft 1 in)
- Position: Midfielder

Team information
- Current team: Amiens SC II (assistant coach)

Senior career*
Years	Team	Apps	(Gls)
2003	Cotonsport Garoua		
2003–2006	Sedan	4	(0)
2006–2008	Louhans-Cuiseaux	50	(1)
2008–2012	Rouen	105	(10)
2012–2013	Carquefou	32	(0)
2013–2014	Luzenac AP	28	(1)
2014–2016	Angers	14	(1)
2016–2018	Amiens	22	(1)
2018–2019	Quevilly-Rouen	10	(1)

Managerial career
- 2020–: Amiens SC II (assistant coach)
- * Club domestic league appearances and goals

Guy Adolphe Ngosso Massouma (born 11 January 1985), known as Guy Ngosso, is a Cameroonian former professional footballer who last played as a midfielder for Championnat National club US Quevilly-Rouen. He is currently an assistant coach with Amiens SC II.

== Playing career ==
Born in Douala, Ngosso began his career with Cotonsport Garoua.

He played on the professional level in Ligue 2 for CS Sedan Ardennes.

In 2014, he played for Luzenac AP in the French third-tier when the club was not allowed to compete in Ligue 2. In September 2014, Luzenac freed him from his contract and he was signed by Ligue 2 team Angers SCO.

In June 2016, Ngosso signed a two-year deal with Amiens SC. After two seasons, including a promotion to Ligue 1, he was released and signed with US Quevilly-Rouen in August 2018.

Release by Quevilly after a year, Ngosso did not find a club during the 2019–20 season, and retired.

== Coaching career ==
After retirement, Ngosso joined the training center of Amiens to work on his coaching qualifications. In August 2018 he was named as assistant to the coach of Amiens SC II in Championnat National 3.
