= Yoann Andreu =

French footballer (born 1989)

Personal information
- Date of birth: 3 May 1989 (age 37)
- Place of birth: Bourg en Bresse, France
- Height: 1.77 m (5 ft 10 in)
- Position: Defender

Youth career
- 1997–2004: Valence
- 2004–2008: Saint-Étienne

Senior career*
Years	Team	Apps	(Gls)
2008–2012	Saint-Étienne	24	(0)
2012–2013	Mouscron-Péruwelz	23	(0)
2013–2015	Gazélec Ajaccio	62	(0)
2015–2019	Angers	71	(1)
Total		180	(1)
- * Club domestic league appearances and goals

Yoann Andreu (born 3 May 1989) is a French former professional footballer who played as a defender.

== Club career ==
Born in Bourg-en-Bresse, Ain, Yoann began his career with amateur side ASOA Valence in Drôme. Following their demise in 2005, he moved to AS Saint-Étienne joining the club as a youth player. In November 2008, he was promoted to the senior squad, following the firing of Laurent Roussey and the hiring of new manager Alain Perrin who was looking to reshuffle Saint-Étienne's defense and fill the squad, which was decimated with injuries. He was assigned the number 33 shirt.

Yoann proceeded to make his professional debut on 22 November 2008 starting the match in the centre-back position alongside Yohan Benalouane, 21, who at the time of the match appeared in only 13 professional matches. He played the full 90 minutes, though Nice won the match 1–0. Just five days later, he started again in a UEFA Cup tie against Belgian side Club Brugge. He also started in Saint-Étienne's upset victory on 3 January 2009 over Bordeaux in the Coupe de France. His positive performances earned him his first professional contract, signing with ASSE for a period of three years.

After the end of the 2018–19 season Andreu announced his retirement as a player due to knee problems.

== International career ==
Yoann is a France youth international having played for the U-17s, U-18s, and is currently playing on the France U-19 squad. On 5 February 2009, his performances with Saint-Étienne earned him his first call-up to the France under-21 team. On 25 May 2009, he was selected to the under-20 squad to participate in the 2009 Mediterranean Games.
