= Billy Ketkeophomphone =

Laotian footballer (born 1990)

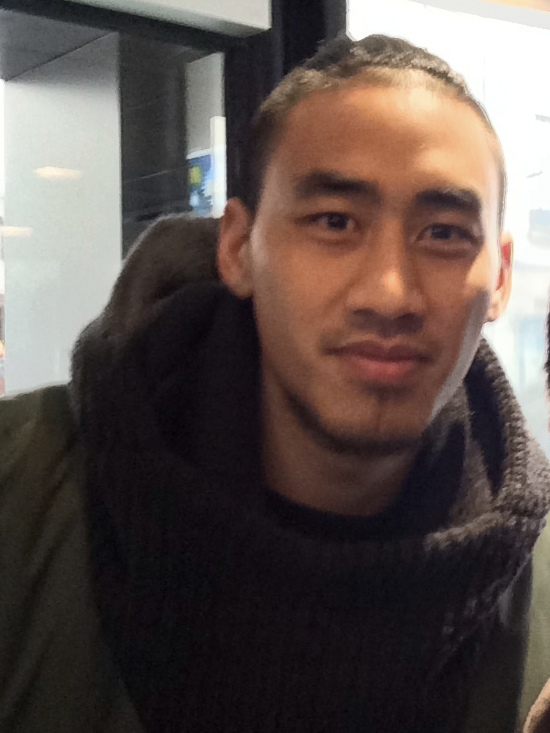
- Ketkeophomphone in 2015

Personal information
- Date of birth: 24 March 1990 (age 36)
- Place of birth: Champigny-sur-Marne, France
- Height: 1.80 m (5 ft 11 in)
- Positions: Forward; attacking midfielder

Youth career
- Racing Paris
- 2003–2006: INF Clairefontaine
- 2007–2009: Strasbourg

Senior career*
Years	Team	Apps	(Gls)
2009–2011	Strasbourg	30	(3)
2011–2012	Sion	1	(0)
2012–2015	Tours	101	(21)
2015–2018	Angers	53	(6)
2018–2019	Auxerre	13	(0)
2019–2020	Cholet	12	(5)
2020–2021	Dunkerque	24	(3)
2021–2022	Sri Pahang	4	(0)
Total		237	(38)

International career^{‡}
2021–2022	Laos	6	(0)
- * Club domestic league appearances and goals as of 16 August 2023 (UTC) ‡ National team caps and goals as of 16:17, 30 December 2022 (UTC)

Billy Ketkeophomphone (French: [bili kɛtkeofɔmfɔn] Lao pronunciation: [ບິນລີ້ ເກດແກ້ວພົມພອນ]; born 24 March 1990) is a former professional footballer who played as a forward or an attacking midfielder. Born in France to Laotian refugee parents, he played for the Laos national team at international level.

== Club career ==
=== Early career ===
Born in Champigny-sur-Marne, Ketkeophomphone began his career with Racing Paris, before joining the prestigious Clairefontaine academy in 2003. After three years, he left the club to sign for Strasbourg. In summer 2008, he was promoted to the first team. He made his debut against Bastia on 1 December 2009 in the Championnat National playing 44 minutes.

On 20 May 2011, he signed a five-year contract with Swiss Super League side Sion. He was released on 31 January 2012 and subsequently returned to France to sign a four-year deal with Tours.

=== Angers ===
On 16 June 2015, Ketkeophomphone signed with Angers, who had just been promoted to Ligue 1. He was the first footballer of Southeast Asian descent to have played in the top division of French football. On 4 October, he scored his first goal for Angers against Bastia. He played 38 games that season, scoring 6 goals.

In his second season, he sustained a knee injury, restricting him to only five games, but still managed to score a goal.

=== Auxerre ===
On 31 August 2018, the last day of the 2018 summer transfer window, Ketkeophomphone moved down a division and joined Auxerre. He made his debut on 14 September 2018 in a match against Clermont Foot.

=== Cholet ===
On 20 November 2019, Ketkeophomphone joined Championnat National side Cholet. He made his debut and scored first goal for Cholet on 22 November 2019 in a match against Red Star.

=== Dunkerque ===
On 1 July 2020, Ketkeophomphone joined Ligue 2 side Dunkerque on a two-year deal. He made his debut on 22 August 2020 in a match against Toulouse. On 29 August 2020, Ketkeophomphone scored his first goal for Dunkerque in the 39th minute against Clermont Foot. He left the club in January 2022.

=== Sri Pahang ===
On 28 January 2022, Ketkeophomphone signed with Malaysian club Sri Pahang. He made his debut on 6 April 2022 in a match against Kedah Darul Aman. He was released by the club only after 4 months joining.

== International career ==
Born to Laotian refugee parents who fled to France in the 1980s, Ketkeophomphone has expressed interest in representing Laos internationally. In 2021, he was called up to the Laotian squad for the 2020 AFF Championship. Ketkeophomphone made his debut for Laos on 6 December 2021 in the AFF Cup against Vietnam. He played all five matches in tournament, scoring his only goal in the 2–2 draw against Myanmar, the last match before Laos’ elimination from the group stage.

== Career statistics ==
=== International ===
As of match played 30 December 2022

Appearances and goals by national team and year
National team	Year	Apps	Goals
Laos	2021	4	0
Laos	2022	2	0
Total		6	0
