= Mathias Serin =

French professional footballer (born 1991)

Personal information
- Date of birth: 1 August 1991 (age 35)
- Place of birth: Pessac, France
- Height: 1.69 m (5 ft 7 in)
- Position: Attacking midfielder

Team information
- Current team: Lège-Cap-Ferret

Youth career
- Bordeaux
- Châtellerault
- Châteauroux

Senior career*
Years	Team	Apps	(Gls)
2010–2012	Châtellerault	5	(0)
2012–2014	Chartres	49	(8)
2014–2015	Romorantin	25	(5)
2015–2018	Angers B	33	(6)
2015–2018	Angers	1	(0)
2017–2018	→ Dunkerque (loan)	30	(7)
2018–2019	Boulogne	28	(2)
2019	Boulogne B	5	(0)
2019–2020	Le Puy	10	(1)
2020–2021	Béziers	8	(1)
2021–2023	Colomiers	27	(2)
2023–	Lège-Cap-Ferret	26	(1)
- * Club domestic league appearances and goals as of 23 November 2024

Mathias Serin (born 1 August 1991) is a French professional footballer who plays as a midfielder for Championnat National 3 club Lège-Cap-Ferret.

== Club career ==
Serin began playing football in the youth system of Bordeaux. He played amateur football before turning professional with Ligue 1 club Angers at age 23.

After making his debut in the French lower divisions, Serin joined Angers in June 2015. He made his full professional debut a few months later, in a 1–0 Ligue 1 victory over Troyes, coming up as a late game substitute for Abdoul Camara.

After he left Angers, Serin played semi-pro football with Dunkerque, and the club's supporters chose him as player of the month for December 2017. One season later, he joined local rivals Boulogne. In November 2019 he left Boulogne for Le Puy.
