= Goran Karanović =

Swiss footballer (born 1987)

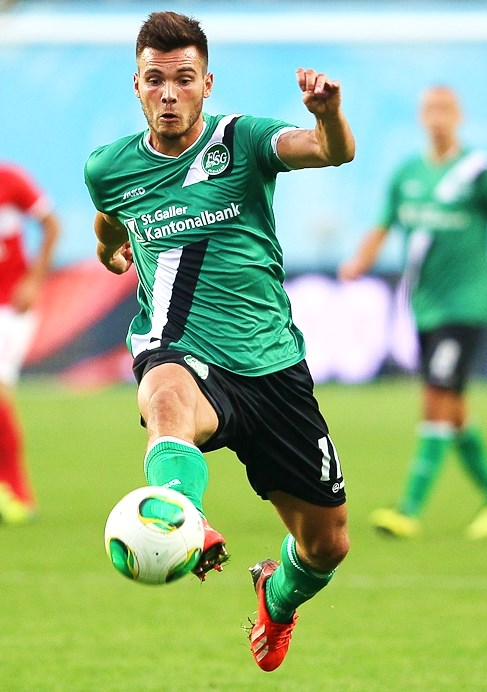

Personal information
- Date of birth: 13 October 1987 (age 39)
- Place of birth: Sanski Most, SFR Yugoslavia
- Height: 1.85 m (6 ft 1 in)
- Position: Striker

Team information
- Current team: Wohlen

Youth career
- –2004: Wohlen

Senior career*
Years	Team	Apps	(Gls)
2004–2008	Wohlen	71	(16)
2008–2010	Luzern	2	(0)
2009	→ Wohlen (loan)	6	(1)
2009–2010	→ Kriens (loan)	23	(5)
2010–2013	Servette	84	(23)
2013–2015	St. Gallen	59	(18)
2015–2018	Angers	12	(1)
2016–2017	→ Sochaux (loan)	9	(2)
2018–2019	Aarau	20	(8)
2019–2020	Sepsi OSK	29	(9)
2020–2021	Hermannstadt	15	(1)
2020	→ FCSB (loan)	0	(0)
2021–2022	Young Fellows Juventus	12	(8)
2023	Mutschellen		
2024-	Wohlen		

International career^{‡}
2007	Switzerland U21	2	(0)
- * Club domestic league appearances and goals as of 4 December 2021 ‡ National team caps and goals as of 18 December 2013

Goran Karanović (Serbian Cyrillic: Горан Карановић) (born 13 October 1987) is a Swiss-Serbian football forward for Wohlen.

== Career ==
In September 2017, Karanović tore his cruciate ligament in his first match after recovering from the same injury.

== International career ==
Karanović played twice for Switzerland U-21 in 2007.

== Honours ==
Sepsi OSK

- Cupa României runner-up: 2019–20
