= Kalifa Traoré =

Malian footballer

Personal information
- Full name: Kalifa Traoré
- Date of birth: 16 February 1991 (age 35)
- Place of birth: Bamako, Mali
- Height: 1.88 m (6 ft 2 in)
- Position: Centre-back

Team information
- Current team: Les Herbiers
- Number: 5

Youth career
- 2009–2011: JS Centre Salif Keita
- 2011–2012: Paris Saint-Germain

Senior career*
Years	Team	Apps	(Gls)
2011–2014	Paris Saint-Germain B	50	(7)
2012–2013	→ Sedan (loan)	16	(0)
2012–2013	→ Sedan B (loan)	9	(1)
2014–2016	Angers	10	(0)
2014–2016	Angers B	10	(0)
2016	→ Les Herbiers (loan)	11	(1)
2016–	Les Herbiers	83	(4)
2016–2017	Les Herbiers B	5	(0)

International career
2011	Mali U20	7	(0)
- * Club domestic league appearances and goals as of 17:03, 14 May 2022 (UTC)

Kalifa Traoré (born 16 February 1991) is a Malian professional footballer who plays as a centre-back for Championnat National 1 club Les Herbiers.

== Club career ==
Traoré came through the youth ranks at Malian club JS Centre Salif Keita, joining in 2009 and spending two seasons at the club, before signing for French side Paris Saint-Germain in January 2011. He progressed through the ranks, and eventually signed a professional contract in 2012. Traoré later joined Ligue 2 side Sedan on loan until the end of the season.

In June 2014, Traoré joined Angers, another Ligue 2 team, signing a three-year contract.

== International career ==
Kalifa Traoré has been capped at youth levels up to Mali U20 level.
