= Ismaël Keïta =

Malian footballer

Personal information
- Full name: Ismaël Keïta Vieira
- Date of birth: 8 July 1990 (age 36)
- Place of birth: Bamako, Mali
- Height: 1.88 m (6 ft 2 in)
- Position: Defensive midfielder

Team information
- Current team: Saran
- Number: 12

Youth career
- Centre Salif Keita

Senior career*
Years	Team	Apps	(Gls)
2007–2009	Centre Salif Keita		
2009–2013	Nantes	47	(0)
2012–2013	Nantes B	13	(3)
2013–2016	Angers	47	(0)
2014–2015	Angers B	7	(2)
2016	Paris FC	14	(0)
2017	Gazişehir Gaziantep	5	(0)
2017–2020	Cholet	53	(0)
2020–2022	Orléans	54	(1)
2022–2025	Créteil	71	(7)
2025–	Saran	7	(0)

International career
2010–2011	Mali	6	(0)
- * Club domestic league appearances and goals as of 7 February 2026

Ismaël Keïta Vieira (born 8 July 1990) is a Malian professional footballer who plays as a defensive midfielder for French Championnat National 3 club Saran.

== Club career ==
Born in Bamako, Keïta started his career with the Centre Salif Keita in 2007. On 12 August 2009, he joined French Ligue 2 club Nantes, signing a four-year contract. He made his league debut as a substitute in a 0–1 defeat against Arles-Avignon on 30 April 2010.

At the end of his contract he left Nantes and signed a three-year contract with fellow Ligue 2 side Angers. His league debut came on 2 August 2013 in a 2–4 away victory over Istres.

Midway through the final year of his Angers contract, he agreed a termination deal with the club, and signed a six-month deal with Paris FC, with an option for an additional year if the club remained in Ligue 2. Paris FC were relegated at the end of the season, and Keïta was without a club until he signed for TFF First League side Gazişehir Gaziantep on 5 January 2017.

In September 2017 Keïta returned to France, signing for Championnat National side Cholet. After two seasons as a regular starter for Cholet, Keïta had an aborted transfer to Red Star in the summer of 2019, which disrupted the start to the 2019–20 season. At the end of the season he signed for Orléans on a one-year contract with an option to extend to a second year.

On 13 July 2022, Keïta joined Créteil in the fourth tier.

== International career ==
Between 2010 and 2011, he won six caps for the Mali national team.
