= Diego Gómez (footballer, born 1984) =

Argentine footballer (born 1984)

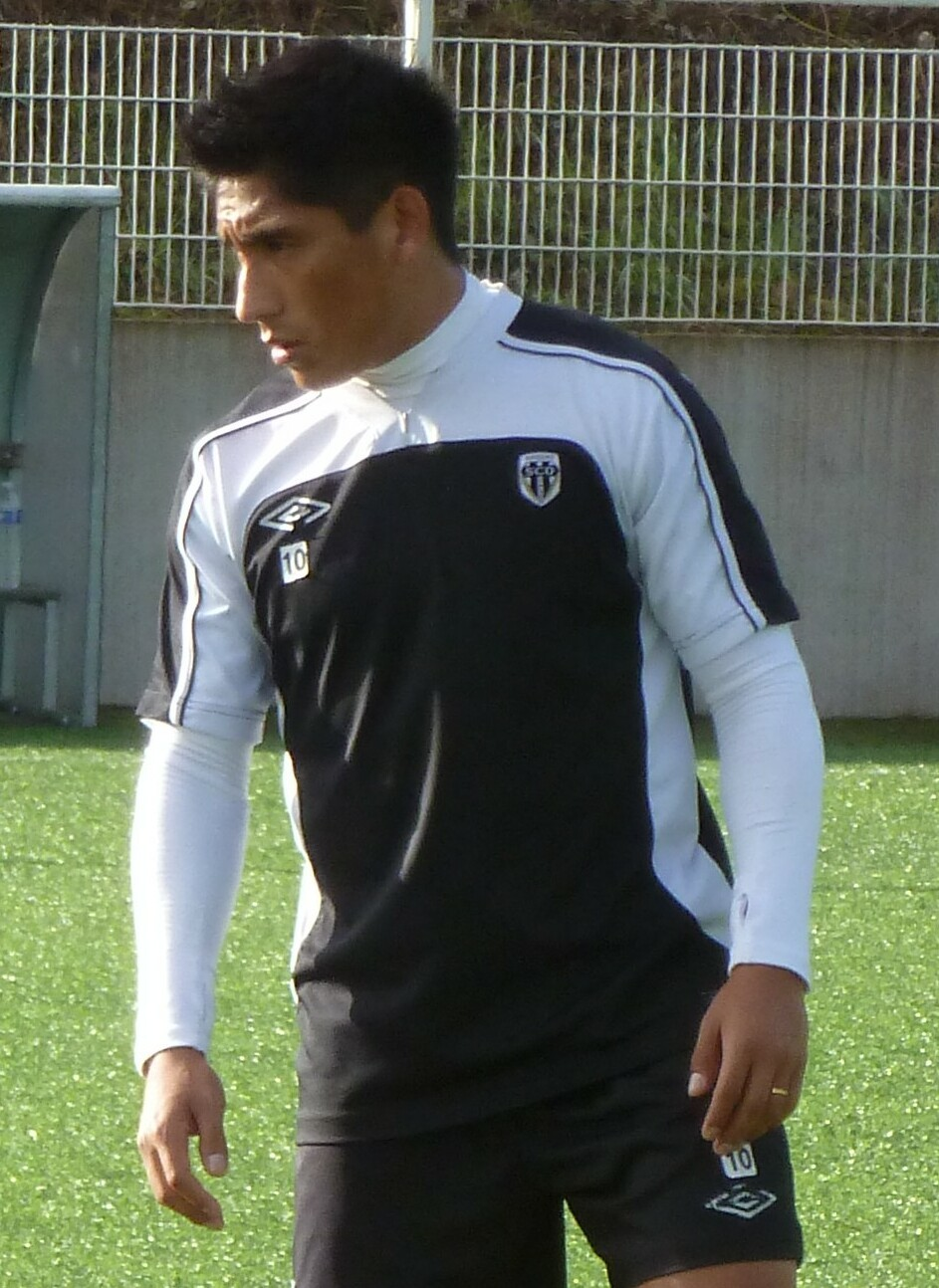
- Gómez in 2012

Personal information
- Full name: Diego Sebastián Gómez
- Date of birth: 5 January 1984 (age 42)
- Place of birth: Rosario, Argentina
- Height: 1.64 m (5 ft 5 in)
- Position: Striker

Youth career
- 2002–2003: Gueugnon

Senior career*
Years	Team	Apps	(Gls)
2003–2007	Gueugnon	42	(3)
2007–2010	Tours	43	(10)
2010–2011	Montluçon	2	(3)
2011–2016	Angers	84	(5)
2012	Angers II	13	(4)
2016	→ Boulogne (loan)	6	(1)
2016	→ Boulogne II (loan)	3	(0)
2016–2018	Cholet	58	(19)
2018–2019	Bergerac	26	(5)
Total		277	(50)
- * Club domestic league appearances and goals

Diego Sebastián Gómez (born 5 January 1984) is an Argentine former professional footballer who played as a striker.

He acquired French nationality by naturalization on 20 March 2009.
