= Grégory Bourillon =

French footballer (born 1984)

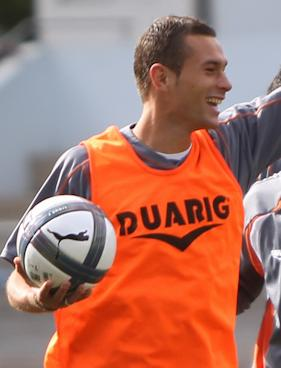
- Bourillon with Lorient in 2012

Personal information
- Date of birth: 1 July 1984 (age 42)
- Place of birth: Laval, France
- Height: 1.87 m (6 ft 2 in)
- Position: Centre-back

Youth career
- 1992–1996: U.S.C. Pays de Montsurs
- 1996–2000: Stade Lavallois
- 2000–2002: Rennes

Senior career*
Years	Team	Apps	(Gls)
2002–2007	Rennes	114	(0)
2007–2010	Paris Saint-Germain	36	(0)
2010–2014	Lorient	118	(4)
2012–2013	Lorient B	4	(0)
2014–2016	Reims	21	(1)
2015	Reims B	7	(1)
2016–2017	Angers	13	(2)
2017–2019	Châteauroux	66	(9)
Total		379	(17)

International career
2003–2006	France U21	20	(0)
- * Club domestic league appearances and goals

Grégory Bourillon (born 1 July 1984) is a French former professional footballer who played as a centre-back.

== Career ==
Bourillon signed for Stade Rennais in 2000 from hometown club Laval. He represented France at Under-21 level. Bourillon developed into a regular starter for the Breton team and was said to have a bright future ahead of him.

Paris Saint-Germain signed him to a four-year contract on 19 July 2007. On 1 February 2010, he signed for FC Lorient.

On 24 June 2014, Bourillon signed for Stade de Reims on a three-year contract.

On 27 July 2017, Bourillon signed for LB Châteauroux on a two-year contract. He was released by LB Châteauroux after the 2018–19 season.

He was in talks with clubs to continue his career but decided to retire.

After retiring as a player, Bourillon earned a university diploma in management of sports organisations in a two-year course. In January 2021 he took over as general manager of Stade Bordelais.

== Personal life ==
Bourillon has an older brother, Yoann, who is also a professional footballer.

== Honours ==
- Coupe Gambardella 2003
- Coupe de la Ligue: 2007–08
