= N'Diaye =

N'Diaye is the Senegalese variant of the name Njie, originating from the Ndiaye clan of the Wolof. N'Diaye may refer to:

- Alassane N'Diaye (born 1990), French-Senegalese football player
- Albert Abdoulaye N'Diaye (active 1959–1971..), official of the Scout Movement in French West Africa
- Alfred N'Diaye (born 1990), French-Senegalese football player
- Amath Ndiaye Diedhiou (born 1996), Senegalese football player
- Assane N'Diaye (1974–2008), Senegalese football player
- Badou Ndiaye (born 1990), Senegalese football player
- Cheikh N'Diaye (born 1985), Senegalese football player
- Cherif Ndiaye (born 1996), Senegalese football player
- Doudou N'Diaye Rose (1930–2015), Senegalese drummer
- Elhadjy Madior N'Diaye (born 1983), Senegalese football player
- Hamady N'Diaye (born 1987), Senegalese basketball player
- Iba N'Diaye (1928–2008), French-Senegalese painter
- Leyti N'Diaye (born 1985), Senegalese footballer
- Maimouna N'Diaye, Senegalese actress and comedian
- Makhtar N'Diaye (born 1981), Senegalese football player
- Makhtar N'Diaye (basketball) (born 1973), Senegalese basketball player
- Mamadou N'Diaye (born 1975), Senegalese professional basketball player
- Mamadou N'Diaye (born 1984), Senegalese footballer
- Mamadou N'Diaye (born 1993), Senegalese professional basketball player
- Mame N'Diaye (born 1986), Senegalese footballer
- Mamoutou N'Diaye (born 1990), Malian footballer
- Mohamed N'Diaye (born 1997), Guinean footballer
- Mouhamed N'Diaye (born 1996), Senegalese footballer
- Momar N'Diaye (born 1987), Senegalese football striker
- Moussa N'Diaye (footballer, born 1979), Senegalese footballer
- Moussa Ndiaye (footballer, born 1999), Senegalese footballer
- Moussa N'Diaye (footballer, born 2002), Senegalese footballer
- Moussa Narou N'Diaye (1934–2021), Senegalese basketball player
- Nicolas Ambroise N'Diaye
- Ousmane N'Diaye (basketball) (born 2004), Senegalese basketball player
- Ousmane N'Diaye (footballer) (born 1991), Senegalese professional footballer
- Papa Waigo N'Diaye (born 1984), Senegalese football player
- Pepe N'Diaye (born 1975), Senegalese football player
- Robert N'Diaye (1942–2025), Senegalese wrestler
- Sylvain N'Diaye (born 1976), French-born Senegalese footballer
- Tenema N'Diaye (born 1981), Malian football player
- Tidiane N'Diaye (1950–2025), Franco-Senegalese anthropologist, economist, and writer

== See also ==
- Ndiaye (disambiguation)
- Ndoye (disambiguation)
