= Ndoye =

Ndoye or N'Doye is a Senegalese surname and may refer to:

- Abdoulaye N'Doye, French basketball player
- Alexandre Ndoye (born 1992), French basketball player
- Assane N'Doye, Senegalese judoka
- Birama Ndoye (born 1994), Senegalese footballer
- Cheikh N'Doye (born 1986), Senegalese footballer
- Dame N'Doye (born 1985), Senegalese footballer
- Dan Ndoye (born 2000), Swiss footballer
- Doudou Ndoye (born 1944), Senegalese lawyer and politician
- Falla N'Doye (born 1960), Senegalese football referee
- Issa Ndoye (born 1985), Senegalese footballer
- Kéné Ndoye (1978–2023), Senegalese female track and field athlete
- Lingeer Ndoye Demba (14th–15th century), Serer princess from the Kingdom of Sine
- Maleye N'Doye, Senegalese basketball player
- Mamadou N'Doye, Senegalese basketball player
- Mariama Ndoye (born 1953), Senegalese writer
- Mayoro N'Doye, Senegalese footballer
- Moustapha Ndoye (1968–2009), Senegalese photographer and film director
- Ousmane N'Doye (born 1978), Senegalese footballer
- Yohann Ndoye-Brouard, French swimmer

== See also ==
- Ndoye Douts, Senegalese plastic artist
- Ndiaye (disambiguation)
- N'Diaye (disambiguation)
- Njie (disambiguation)
