= 2019–20 Angers SCO season =

Angers
2019–20 season
- President: Saïd Chabane
- Head coach: Stéphane Moulin
- Stadium: Stade Raymond Kopa
- Ligue 1: 11th
- Coupe de France: Round of 16
- Coupe de la Ligue: Round of 32
- Top goalscorer: League: Rachid Alioui (6); All: Rachid Alioui (7)
Home colours	Away colours	Third colours

The 2019–20 season was Angers SCO's 101st season in existence and the club's 5th consecutive season in the top flight of French football. In addition to the domestic league, Angers participated in this season's editions of the Coupe de France, and the Coupe de la Ligue. The season covered the period from 1 July 2019 to 30 June 2020.

== Players ==
=== Current squad ===
As of 15 January 2020.

Note: Flags indicate national team as defined under FIFA eligibility rules; some limited exceptions apply. Players may hold more than one non-FIFA nationality.

No.	Pos.	Nation	Player
2	DF	FRA	Rayan Aït-Nouri
4	DF	CRO	Mateo Pavlović
5	MF	FRA	Thomas Mangani (3rd captain)
7	FW	MAR	Rachid Alioui
8	DF	CIV	Ismaël Traoré (Captain)
10	MF	FRA	Angelo Fulgini
11	FW	FRA	Wilfried Kanga
13	DF	ALG	Haithem Loucif
14	MF	FRA	Anthony Gomez Mancini
15	MF	FRA	Pierrick Capelle
16	GK	FRA	Ludovic Butelle (Vice-captain)
18	MF	FRA	Baptiste Santamaria
19	FW	CMR	Stéphane Bahoken

No.	Pos.	Nation	Player
20	MF	SEN	Sada Thioub
21	FW	CHA	Casimir Ninga
23	MF	FRA	Antonin Bobichon
24	DF	FRA	Romain Thomas
25	DF	CIV	Abdoulaye Bamba
26	DF	FRA	Théo Pellenard
27	MF	POR	Mathias Pereira Lage
28	FW	ALG	Farid El Melali
29	DF	FRA	Vincent Manceau
30	GK	MNE	Danijel Petković
40	GK	FRA	Anthony Mandrea
—	GK	FRA	Alexandre Letellier

=== Out on loan ===
Note: Flags indicate national team as defined under FIFA eligibility rules; some limited exceptions apply. Players may hold more than one non-FIFA nationality.

No.	Pos.	Nation	Player
—	DF	SEN	Elhadji Pape Diaw (on loan to Caen)
—	FW	BEL	Baptiste Guillaume (on loan to Valenciennes)
—	MF	FRA	Vincent Pajot (on loan to Metz)
—	MF	MLI	Lassana Coulibaly (on loan to Cercle Brugge)

No.	Pos.	Nation	Player
—	DF	FRA	Ibrahim Cissé (on loan to Paris)
—	FW	COD	Harrison Manzala (on loan to Le Mans)
—	FW	CIV	Thomas Touré (on loan to Sochaux)

== Pre-season and friendlies ==
Win Draw Loss

13 July 2019 Friendly	Angers (France)	3–1	(France) Les Herbiers	Les Sables-d'Olonne, France
17:00 CEST (UTC+2)	Kanga 15'; Mbock 53'; Fulgini 56'		Mimoun 74' (pen.)	Stadium: Stade de La Rudelière

17 July 2019 Friendly	Orléans (France)	0–1	(France) Angers	Saumur, France
19:00 CEST (UTC+2)			Capelle 34'	Stadium: Stade des Rives du Thouet

20 July 2019 Friendly	Angers (France)	3–2	(France) Le Havre	Sablé, France
16:30 CEST (UTC+2)	Fulgini 4', 16'; El Melali 45+1'		Thiaré 25'; Kadewere 90'	Stadium: Stade Rémy Lambert

24 July 2019 Friendly	Feyenoord (Netherlands)	2–2	(France) Angers	Rotterdam, Netherlands
20:00 CEST (UTC+2)	Berghuis 17', 47'		Berghuis 45+4' (o.g.); Fulgini 61'	Stadium: De Kuip

27 July 2019 Friendly	Angers (France)	1–2	(Germany) Borussia Mönchengladbach	Straelen, Germany
16:00 CEST (UTC+2)	Kanga 24'		Johnson 72'; Herrmann 76'	Stadium: Stadion an der Römerstraße; Attendance: 2,500

31 July 2019 Friendly	Angers (France)	1–1 (3–4 p)	(England) Arsenal	Angers, France
19:30 CEST (UTC+2)	El Melali 13'		Medley (yellow card) 37'; Nelson 49'; Willock (yellow card) 74'; Maitland-Niles (yellow card) 89'	Stadium: Stade Raymond Kopa; Referee: Jérémie Pignard (France)
	Penalties
	Manceau (penalty scored); Capelle (penalty scored); Thomas (penalty scored); Kanga (penalty missed); Reine-Adélaïde (penalty missed)		(penalty scored) Maitland-Niles; (penalty scored) Willock; (penalty scored) Xhaka; (penalty scored) Aubameyang; (penalty missed) Mkhitaryan

== Competitions ==
=== Overview ===
Competition	First match	Last match	Starting round	Final position	Record							
Competition	First match	Last match	Starting round	Final position	Pld	W	D	L	GF	GA	GD	Win %
Ligue 1	10 August 2019	7 March 2020	Matchday 1	11th	28	11	6	11	28	33	−5	39.29
Coupe de France	5 January 2020	28 January 2020	Round of 64	Round of 16	3	2	0	1	11	7	+4	66.67
Coupe de la Ligue	30 October 2019		Round of 32	Round of 32	1	0	0	1	2	3	−1	0.00
Total					32	13	6	13	41	43	−2	40.63

Source: Soccerway

=== Ligue 1 ===
==== League table ====
Pos	Team	Pld	W	D	L	GF	GA	GD	Pts	PPG
9	Monaco	28	11	7	10	44	44	0	40	1.43
10	Strasbourg	27	11	5	11	32	32	0	38	1.41
11	Angers	28	11	6	11	28	33	−5	39	1.39
12	Bordeaux	28	9	10	9	40	34	+6	37 (Note: Bordeaux finished ahead of Nantes on head-to-head points: Bordeaux 2–0 Nantes, Nantes 0–1 Bordeaux.)	1.32
13	Nantes	28	11	4	13	28	31	−3	37	1.32

Source: Ligue 1
Rules for classification: 1) Points per game; 2) Head-to-head points; 3) Head-to-head goal difference; 4) Goal difference; 5) Goals scored; 6) Fairplay ranking.

==== Results summary ====
Overall								Home						Away					
Pld	W	D	L	GF	GA	GD	Pts	W	D	L	GF	GA	GD	W	D	L	GF	GA	GD
28	11	6	11	28	33	−5	39	8	3	4	20	13	+7	3	3	7	8	20	−12

Source: Ligue 1

==== Results by round ====
Round	1	2	3	4	5	6	7	8	9	10	11	12	13	14	15	16	17	18	19	20	21	22	23	24	25	26	27	28	29	30	31	32	33	34	35	36	37	38
Ground	H	A	H	H	A	H	A	H	A	H	A	H	A	H	A	H	A	H	A	H	A	H	A	H	A	H	A	H	A	H	A	H	A	H	A	H	A	H
Result	W	L	W	W	L	W	W	D	L	L	D	W	D	W	L	L	L	D	W	D	D	L	L	L	L	W	W	W	C	C	C	C	C	C	C	C	C	C
Position	3	11	6	4	7	2	2	2	3	5	5	2	3	3	3	8	12	11	8	9	9	12	13	14	14	14	13	10	11	11	11	11	11	11	11	11	11	11

Source: Ligue 1
A = Away; H = Home; W = Win; D = Draw; L = Loss; C = Cancelled

==== Matches ====
The Ligue 1 schedule was announced on 14 June 2019. The Ligue 1 matches were suspended by the LFP on 13 March 2020 due to COVID-19 until further notices. On 28 April 2020, it was announced that Ligue 1 and Ligue 2 campaigns would not resume, after the country banned all sporting events until September. On 30 April, The LFP ended officially the 2019–20 season.

10 August 2019 1	Angers	3–1	Bordeaux	Angers
20:00 CEST (UTC+2)	Thomas (yellow card) 3'; Reine-Adélaïde 27'; Pereira Lage 33'; Mangani 45'; Capelle (yellow card) 76'	Report	De Préville 4'; Benito (yellow card) 89'	Stadium: Stade Raymond Kopa; Attendance: 10,749; Referee: Hakim Ben El Hadj

16 August 2019 2	Lyon	6–0	Angers	Décines-Charpieu
20:45 CEST (UTC+2)	Aouar 11'; Dembélé 36', 65'; Depay 42', 48'; Traoré (yellow card) 61'; Jean Lucas 72'	Report	Capelle (yellow card) 70'; Bahoken (yellow card) 90+3'	Stadium: Groupama Stadium; Attendance: 49,871; Referee: Benoît Millot

24 August 2019 3	Angers	3–0	Metz	Angers
20:00 CEST (UTC+2)	El Melali 4'; Santamaria 43'; Bahoken (yellow card) 53'; Alioui 67'	Report	Sunzu (yellow card) 1'; Centonze (yellow card) 75'	Stadium: Stade Raymond Kopa; Attendance: 9,001; Referee: Stéphanie Frappart

31 August 2019 4	Angers	2–0	Dijon	Angers
20:00 CEST (UTC+2)	Muzinga 50' (o.g.); El Melali 71'	Report	Baldé (yellow card) 43'; Muzinga (yellow card) 86'	Stadium: Stade Raymond Kopa; Attendance: 8,988; Referee: Jérémie Pignard

13 September 2019 5	Lille	2–1	Angers	Villeneuve-d'Ascq
19:00 CEST (UTC+2)	Osimhen (yellow card) 36', (goal) 39'; Luiz Araújo 53'	Report	Thomas (yellow card) 67'; Bahoken 87'; Thioub (yellow card) 90+5'	Stadium: Stade Pierre-Mauroy; Attendance: 32,834; Referee: Ruddy Buquet

22 September 2019 6	Angers	4–1	Saint-Étienne	Angers
17:00 CEST (UTC+2)	Capelle 48'; Aït-Nouri (yellow card) 75'; Ninga 78', 86', 89'	Report	Nordin 34'; Trauco (yellow card) 77'	Stadium: Stade Raymond Kopa; Attendance: 9,831; Referee: Frank Schneider

25 September 2019 7	Toulouse	0–2	Angers	Toulouse
19:00 CEST (UTC+2)	Gradel (yellow card) 90+3'	Report	Alioui 88', 90+5'	Stadium: Stadium de Toulouse; Attendance: 10,177; Referee: Olivier Thual

28 September 2019 8	Angers	1–1	Amiens	Angers
20:00 CEST (UTC+2)	Cissé (yellow card) 35'; Alioui 83'	Report	Mendoza 13'	Stadium: Stade Raymond Kopa; Attendance: 9,331; Referee: Karim Abed

5 October 2019 9	Paris Saint-Germain	4–0	Angers	Paris
17:30 CEST (UTC+2)	Sarabia 13', (yellow card) 23'; Icardi 37'; Gueye 59'; Neymar (yellow card) 82', (goal) 90'; Paredes (yellow card) 86'	Report	Pereira Lage (yellow card) 52'	Stadium: Parc des Princes; Attendance: 47,700; Referee: Willy Delajod

19 October 2019 10	Angers	0–1	Brest	Angers
20:00 CEST (UTC+2)	Pavlović (yellow card) 90+6'	Report	Cardona 67'	Stadium: Stade Raymond Kopa; Attendance: 10,369; Referee: Eric Wattellier

26 October 2019 11	Montpellier	0–0	Angers	Montpellier
20:00 CEST (UTC+2)	Savanier (yellow card) 59'; Mollet (yellow card) 90+4'	Report	Traoré (yellow card) 49'; Capelle (yellow card) 75'; Pereira Lage (yellow card) 90+1'	Stadium: Stade de la Mosson; Attendance: 12,678; Referee: Benoît Millot

2 November 2019 12	Angers	1–0	Strasbourg	Angers
20:00 CET (UTC+1)	Bahoken 26' (pen.); Aït-Nouri (yellow card) 89'	Report	Zohi (yellow card) 76'	Stadium: Stade Raymond Kopa; Attendance: 9,681; Referee: Florent Batta

9 November 2019 13	Reims	0–0	Angers	Reims
20:00 CET (UTC+1)	Munetsi (yellow card) 72'; Oudin (yellow card) 72'	Report	Fulgini (yellow card) 23' (yellow-red card) 71'; Santamaria (yellow card) 50'	Stadium: Stade Auguste Delaune; Attendance: 10,876; Referee: Hakim Ben El Hadj

23 November 2019 14	Angers	1–0	Nîmes	Angers
20:00 CET (UTC+1)	Bamba (yellow card) 45+1'; Mangani 67'; Pellenard (yellow card) 69'	Report	Fomba (yellow card) 34'	Stadium: Stade Raymond Kopa; Attendance: 8,714; Referee: Thomas Leonard

30 November 2019 15	Nice	3–1	Angers	Nice
20:00 CET (UTC+1)	Dante (yellow card) 7'; Lusamba 39'; Maolida 53'; Dolberg (yellow card) 75', (goal) 90'	Report	Fulgini 22'; Thioub (yellow card) 45+1'	Stadium: Allianz Riviera; Attendance: 15,814; Referee: Antony Gautier

3 December 2019 16	Angers	0–2	Marseille	Angers
19:00 CET (UTC+1)	Thomas (yellow card) 39'	Report	Strootman (yellow card) 15'; Sanson 17'; Payet 41' (pen.)	Stadium: Stade Raymond Kopa; Attendance: 12,455; Referee: Frank Schneider

7 December 2019 17	Rennes	2–1	Angers	Rennes
20:00 CET (UTC+1)	Niang 25', 79'; Da Silva (yellow card) 26'; Traoré (yellow card) 44'; Camavinga (yellow card) 67'	Report	Thomas (yellow card) 45+1'; Alioui 90+3'	Stadium: Roazhon Park; Attendance: 25,656; Referee: Amaury Delerue

14 December 2019 18	Angers	0–0	Monaco	Angers
20:00 CET (UTC+1)	Aït-Nouri (yellow card) 50'; Traoré (yellow card) 70'; Bahoken (yellow card) 76'; Capelle (yellow card) 78'	Report	Jemerson (yellow card) 40'; Silva (yellow card) 63'; Dias (yellow card) 88'	Stadium: Stade Raymond Kopa; Attendance: 9,959; Referee: Hakim Ben El Hadj

21 December 2019 19	Nantes	1–2	Angers	Nantes
20:45 CET (UTC+1)	Blas 17'; Pallois (yellow card) 90'	Report	Bobichon 50'; El Melali 87'	Stadium: Stade de la Beaujoire; Attendance: 29,807; Referee: Jérémie Pignard

11 January 2020 20	Angers	1–1	Nice	Angers
20:00 CET (UTC+1)	Capelle (yellow card) 34'; Thioub 37'	Report	Boudaoui (yellow card) 39'; Cyprien 45+4' (pen.); Claude-Maurice (yellow card) 49'; Lees-Melou (yellow card) 87'	Stadium: Stade Raymond Kopa; Attendance: 9,105; Referee: Willy Delajod

25 January 2020 21	Marseille	0–0	Angers	Marseille
17:30 CET (UTC+1)	Amavi (yellow card) 89'	Report	Alioui (yellow card) 54'; Manceau (yellow card) 81'	Stadium: Stade Vélodrome; Attendance: 55,761; Referee: Johan Hamel

1 February 2020 22	Angers	1–4	Reims	Angers
20:00 CET (UTC+1)	Alioui 7'; Capelle (yellow card) 36'	Report	Cassamá (yellow card) 27'; Touré 38' (pen.), (yellow card) 51'; Abdelhamid 62'; Santamaria 74' (o.g.); Dia 75'	Stadium: Stade Raymond Kopa; Attendance: 9,267; Referee: Amaury Delerue

4 February 2020 23	Monaco	1–0	Angers	Monaco
19:00 CET (UTC+1)	Jovetić 18'; Silva (yellow card) 73'; Tchouaméni (yellow card) 79'	Report	Traoré (yellow card) 55'; Pavlović (yellow card) 83'	Stadium: Stade Louis II; Attendance: 3,585; Referee: Jérémy Stinat

7 February 2020 24	Angers	0–2	Lille	Angers
20:45 CET (UTC+1)	Traoré (yellow card) 56'; Thioub (yellow card) 85'; Ninga (yellow card) 89'	Report	Osimhen 14'; Çelik (yellow card) 38'; Mandava (yellow card) 51'; Ikoné (yellow card) 53'; Sanches 75'	Stadium: Stade Raymond Kopa; Attendance: 9,145; Referee: Benoît Bastien

15 February 2020 25	Nîmes	1–0	Angers	Nîmes
20:00 CET (UTC+1)	Miguel (yellow card) 17'; Koné 80'	Report	Fulgini (yellow card) 3'; Ninga (yellow card) 15' (red card) 76'	Stadium: Stade des Costières; Attendance: 12,417; Referee: Karim Abed

22 February 2020 26	Angers	1–0	Montpellier	Angers
20:00 CET (UTC+1)	Bamba (yellow card) 32'; Doumbia (yellow card) 40'; Pavlović (yellow card) 64'; Bahoken 68'; Capelle (yellow card) 81'	Report	Delort (yellow card) 83'; Oyongo (yellow card) 90+2'	Stadium: Stade Raymond Kopa; Attendance: 9,453; Referee: Antony Gautier

29 February 2020 27	Brest	0–1	Angers	Brest
20:00 CET (UTC+1)	Belkebla (yellow card) 86'; Court (yellow card) 90+4'; Charbonnier (yellow card) 90+7'	Report	Bahoken 43'; Petković (yellow card) 90+5'	Stadium: Stade Francis-Le Blé; Attendance: 13,313; Referee: Florent Batta

7 March 2020 28	Angers	2–0	Nantes	Angers
20:00 CET (UTC+1)	Bobichon 48'; Thomas 53'	Report	Touré (yellow card) 51'; Pallois (yellow card) 54'; Louza (yellow card) 87'	Stadium: Stade Raymond Kopa; Attendance: 12,132; Referee: Stéphanie Frappart

29	Amiens	Cancelled	Angers	Amiens
--:-- CET (UTC+1)				Stadium: Stade de la Licorne; Attendance: 0

30	Angers	Cancelled	Toulouse	Angers
--:-- CET (UTC+1)				Stadium: Stade Raymond Kopa; Attendance: 0

31	Strasbourg	Cancelled	Angers	Strasbourg
--:-- CEST (UTC+2)				Stadium: Stade de la Meinau; Attendance: 0

32	Angers	Cancelled	Paris Saint-Germain	Angers
--:-- CEST (UTC+2)				Stadium: Stade Raymond Kopa

33	Dijon	Cancelled	Angers	Dijon
--:-- CEST (UTC+2)				Stadium: Stade Gaston Gérard

34	Saint-Étienne	Cancelled	Angers	Saint-Étienne
--:-- CEST (UTC+2)				Stadium: Stade Geoffroy-Guichard

35	Angers	Cancelled	Rennes	Angers
--:-- CEST (UTC+2)				Stadium: Stade Raymond Kopa

36	Bordeaux	Cancelled	Angers	Bordeaux
--:-- CEST (UTC+2)				Stadium: Matmut Atlantique

37	Angers	Cancelled	Lyon	Angers
--:-- CEST (UTC+2)				Stadium: Stade Raymond Kopa

38	Metz	Cancelled	Angers	Metz
--:-- CEST (UTC+2)				Stadium: Stade Saint-Symphorien

=== Coupe de France ===
5 January 2020 Round of 64	FC Dieppe	1–3	Angers	Dieppe
17:15 CET (UTC+1)	Franqueville (yellow card) 57'; Garnier (yellow card) 78'; Etame 86'; Levasseur (yellow card) 89'	Report	Thomas 68'; Mangani (yellow card) 76'; Capelle 84', 90+4'; Manceau (yellow card) 86'; Pavlović (yellow card) 89'	Stadium: Stade Jean Dasnias; Attendance: 4,457; Referee: Bastien Dechepy

19 January 2020 Round of 32	FC Rouen	1–4	Angers	Le Petit-Quevilly
17:15 CET (UTC+1)	Sidibé 13'; Benzia (yellow card) 57'; Sanson (yellow card) 74'	Report	Pavlović (yellow card) 3'; Alioui 5'; El Melali 19', 23'; Bahoken 81'	Stadium: Stade Robert Diochon; Attendance: 10,600; Referee: Benoît Millot

28 January 2020 Round of 16	Angers	4–5 (a.e.t.)	Rennes	Angers
18:30 CET (UTC+1)	Petković (yellow card) 37'; Thioub 52', 85', (yellow card) 100'; Fulgini (yellow card) 60'; Bahoken 89' (pen.); Pereira Lage 105+1'	Report	Maouassa (yellow card) 32'; Léa Siliki 37'; Da Silva (yellow card) 39'; Niang 42', 61' (pen.); Del Castillo (yellow card) 66'; Grenier (yellow card) 72'; Gnagnon (yellow card) 88'; Gboho 101'; Gelin 110'	Stadium: Stade Raymond Kopa; Attendance: 9,821; Referee: Thomas Léonard

=== Coupe de la Ligue ===
30 October 2019 Round of 32	Amiens	3–2	Angers	Amiens
21:05 CET (UTC+1)	Zungu (yellow card) 35'; Jallet (yellow card) 45'; Otero 47'; Cornette 50'; Blin 90+5'	Report	Cissé (yellow card) 39'; Bahoken 44', (yellow card) 84'; Pavlović (yellow card) 72'; Kanga 83'	Stadium: Stade de la Licorne; Attendance: 5,217; Referee: François Letexier

== Statistics ==
=== Appearances and goals ===
No.	Pos	Nat	Player	Total		Ligue 1		Coupe de France		Coupe de la Ligue		UEFA Europa League	
No.	Pos	Nat	Player	Apps	Goals	Apps	Goals	Apps	Goals	Apps	Goals	Apps	Goals
Goalkeepers
16	GK	(France) FRA	Ludovic Butelle	8	0	8	0	0	0	0	0	0	0
30	GK	(Montenegro) MNE	Danijel Petković	0	0	0	0	0	0	0	0	0	0
40	GK	(France) FRA	Anthony Mandrea	0	0	0	0	0	0	0	0	0	0
Defenders
2	DF	(Algeria) ALG	Rayan Aït-Nouri	7	0	7	0	0	0	0	0	0	0
3	DF	(France) FRA	Ibrahim Cissé	1	0	1	0	0	0	0	0	0	0
4	DF	(Croatia) CRO	Mateo Pavlović	4	0	4	0	0	0	0	0	0	0
8	DF	(Ivory Coast) CIV	Ismaël Traoré	5	0	5	0	0	0	0	0	0	0
13	DF	(Algeria) ALG	Haithem Loucif	0	0	0	0	0	0	0	0	0	0
24	DF	(France) FRA	Romain Thomas	8	0	8	0	0	0	0	0	0	0
25	DF	(Ivory Coast) CIV	Abdoulaye Bamba	1	0	1	0	0	0	0	0	0	0
26	DF	(France) FRA	Théo Pellenard	2	0	1+1	0	0	0	0	0	0	0
29	DF	(France) FRA	Vincent Manceau	6	0	6	0	0	0	0	0	0	0
Midfielders
5	MF	(France) FRA	Thomas Mangani	7	1	7	1	0	0	0	0	0	0
6	MF	(France) FRA	Vincent Pajot	5	0	1+4	0	0	0	0	0	0	0
10	MF	(France) FRA	Angelo Fulgini	3	0	2+1	0	0	0	0	0	0	0
14	MF	(France) FRA	Anthony Gomez Mancini	0	0	0	0	0	0	0	0	0	0
15	MF	(France) FRA	Pierrick Capelle	8	1	7+1	1	0	0	0	0	0	0
18	MF	(France) FRA	Baptiste Santamaria	8	1	8	1	0	0	0	0	0	0
20	MF	(Senegal) SEN	Sada Thioub	4	0	2+2	0	0	0	0	0	0	0
23	MF	(France) FRA	Antonin Bobichon	1	0	1	0	0	0	0	0	0	0
27	MF	(Portugal) POR	Mathias Pereira Lage	8	1	7+1	1	0	0	0	0	0	0
Forwards
7	FW	(Morocco) MAR	Rachid Alioui	8	4	5+3	4	0	0	0	0	0	0
11	FW	(France) FRA	Wilfried Kanga	2	0	0+2	0	0	0	0	0	0	0
19	FW	(Cameroon) CMR	Stéphane Bahoken	6	1	3+3	1	0	0	0	0	0	0
21	FW	(Chad) CHA	Casimir Ninga	6	3	1+5	3	0	0	0	0	0	0
28	FW	(Algeria) ALG	Farid El Melali	3	2	2+1	2	0	0	0	0	0	0
Players transferred out during the season

Last updated: 28 September 2019
Source: Competitions
