= 2018–19 Angers SCO season =

Angers
2018–19 season
- Chairman: Saïd Chabane
- Manager: Stéphane Moulin
- Stadium: Stade Raymond Kopa
- Ligue 1: 13th
- Coupe de France: Round of 32
- Highest home attendance: 16,011 (24 May vs. Saint-Étienne)
- Lowest home attendance: 8,342 (10 Nov. vs. Montpellier)
- Average home league attendance: 11,108
- Biggest win: 3–0 v. Nice (16 February 2019)
- Biggest defeat: 0–5 at Lille (18 May 2019)
Home colours	Away colours	Third colours

The 2018–19 Angers SCO season was the 99th professional season of the club since its creation in 1919. During the campaign, the club competed in Ligue 1 as well as the Coupe de France and Coupe de la Ligue.

== Players ==
Note: Flags indicate national team as defined under FIFA eligibility rules; some limited exceptions apply. Players may hold more than one non-FIFA nationality.

No.	Pos.	Nation	Player
1	GK	(France) FRA	Zacharie Boucher (on loan from Auxerre)
2	DF	(France) FRA	Rayan Aït-Nouri
3	DF	(France) FRA	Yoann Andreu
4	DF	(Croatia) CRO	Mateo Pavlović
5	MF	(France) FRA	Thomas Mangani
6	MF	(France) FRA	Vincent Pajot
7	FW	(Democratic Republic of the Congo) COD	Harrison Manzala
8	DF	(Ivory Coast) CIV	Ismaël Traoré (captain)
9	FW	(Spain) ESP	Cristian López
10	MF	(France) FRA	Angelo Fulgini
11	FW	(France) FRA	Wilfried Kanga
12	MF	(Republic of the Congo) CGO	Férébory Doré
13	FW	(France) FRA	Dorian Bertrand
14	MF	(France) FRA	Anthony Gomez Mancini
15	MF	(France) FRA	Pierrick Capelle

No.	Pos.	Nation	Player
16	GK	(France) FRA	Ludovic Butelle
17	MF	(Senegal) SEN	Cheikh N'Doye (vice-captain; on loan from Birmingham City)
18	MF	(France) FRA	Baptiste Santamaria
19	FW	(Cameroon) CMR	Stéphane Bahoken
20	MF	(France) FRA	Flavien Tait
21	MF	(France) FRA	Loïc Puyo
22	MF	(France) FRA	Jeff Reine-Adélaïde
23	DF	(France) FRA	Ibrahim Cissé
24	DF	(France) FRA	Romain Thomas
25	DF	(Ivory Coast) CIV	Abdoulaye Bamba
26	DF	(Senegal) SEN	Saliou Ciss
27	FW	(Ivory Coast) CIV	Thomas Touré
28	FW	(Algeria) ALG	Farid El Melali
29	DF	(France) FRA	Vincent Manceau
40	GK	(France) FRA	Anthony Mandrea

=== Out on loan ===
Note: Flags indicate national team as defined under FIFA eligibility rules; some limited exceptions apply. Players may hold more than one non-FIFA nationality.

No.	Pos.	Nation	Player
—	GK	(France) FRA	Alexandre Letellier (on loan to Troyes)
—	MF	(Mali) MLI	Lassana Coulibaly (on loan to Rangers)

No.	Pos.	Nation	Player
—	FW	(Belgium) BEL	Baptiste Guillaume (on loan to Nîmes)

== Competitions ==
=== Ligue 1 ===
==== League table ====
Pos	Team	Pld	W	D	L	GF	GA	GD	Pts	Qualification or relegation
11	Strasbourg	38	11	16	11	58	48	+10	49	Qualification to Europa League second qualifying round (Note: Strasbourg qualified for the Europa League second qualifying round by winning the 2018–19 Coupe de la Ligue.)
12	Nantes	38	13	9	16	48	48	0	48	
13	Angers	38	10	16	12	44	49	−5	46	
14	Bordeaux	38	10	11	17	34	42	−8	41	
15	Amiens	38	9	11	18	31	52	−21	38	

Source: Ligue 1 and Soccerway
Rules for classification: 1) Points; 2) Goal difference; 3) Head-to-head points; 4) Head-to-head goal difference; 5) Head-to-head goals scored; 6) Head-to-head away goals scored; 7) Goals scored; 8) Away goals scored; 9) Most goals scored in single league match; 10) Fairplay ranking.

==== Results summary ====
Overall								Home						Away					
Pld	W	D	L	GF	GA	GD	Pts	W	D	L	GF	GA	GD	W	D	L	GF	GA	GD
38	10	15	13	44	50	−6	45	5	9	5	24	22	+2	5	6	8	20	28	−8

Last updated: 24 May 2019.
Source: Competitive matches

==== Results by round ====
Round	1	2	3	4	5	6	7	8	9	10	11	12	13	14	15	16	17	18	19	20	21	22	23	24	25	26	27	28	29	30	31	32	33	34	35	36	37	38
Ground	H	A	A	H	A	H	A	H	H	A	H	A	H	A	H	A	H	A	H	A	H	A	H	A	H	A	H	A	H	A	H	A	A	H	A	H	A	H
Result	L	L	L	W	W	D	W	L	D	D	L	L	W	D	D	D	L	D	D	L	W	D	W	W	W	L	D	D	D	D	D	W	L	D	W	L	L	D
Position	11	16	19	18	12	12	8	11	10	10	12	15	13	14	13	14	14	14	15	15	15	14	13	12	12	12	12	12	12	13	12	12	12	13	12	13	13	13

Source: Results
A = Away; H = Home; W = Win; D = Draw; L = Loss

==== Matches ====
Win Draw Loss

11 August 2018 1	Angers	3–4	Nîmes	Angers
20:00 CEST (UTC+2)	Capelle 33'; Manceau (yellow card) 42'; Fulgini 51'; Traoré 55'; Bamba (yellow card) 70'	Report	Thioub 4'; Miguel (yellow card) 74' (yellow-red card) 79'; Depres 76'; Ripart 85'; Thomas 88' (o.g.)	Stadium: Stade Raymond Kopa; Attendance: 9,534; Referee: Antony Gautier

18 August 2018 2	Rennes	1–0	Angers	Rennes
20:00 CEST (UTC+2)	Gelin (yellow card) 58'; Sarr 81'	Report	Kanga (yellow card) 43'; Fulgini (yellow card) 90+3'	Stadium: Roazhon Park; Attendance: 19,300; Referee: Olivier Thual

25 August 2018 3	Paris Saint-Germain	3–1	Angers	Paris
17:00 CEST (UTC+2)	Cavani 12'; Kehrer (yellow card) 21'; Mbappé 52'; N'Soki (yellow card) 63'; Neymar 66'	Report	Mangani 21' (pen.)	Stadium: Parc des Princes; Attendance: 47,105; Referee: Jérôme Miguelgorry

1 September 2018 4	Angers	1–0	Lille	Angers
20:00 CEST (UTC+2)	Traoré 60'; Mangani (red card) 64'	Report	Çelik (yellow card) 56'	Stadium: Stade Raymond Kopa; Attendance: 9,245; Referee: Eric Wattellier

15 September 2018 5	Dijon	1–3	Angers	Dijon
20:00 CEST (UTC+2)	Loiodice (yellow card) 3'; Saïd 13'; Haddadi (yellow card) 32'	Report	Bahoken 20'; Tait 29'; Santamaria 38'; Pavlović (yellow card) 54'; Kanga (yellow card) 72'	Stadium: Stade Gaston Gérard; Attendance: 12,273; Referee: Hakim Ben El Hadj

22 September 2018 6	Angers	0–0	Toulouse	Angers
20:00 CEST (UTC+2)	Capelle (yellow card) 34'	Report	Sangaré (yellow card) 43'; Amian (yellow card) 55'	Stadium: Stade Raymond Kopa; Attendance: 10,021; Referee: Florent Batta

25 September 2018 7	Monaco	0–1	Angers	Monaco
19:00 CEST (UTC+2)	Falcao (yellow card) 39'	Report	N'Doye (yellow card) 13'; Bahoken 27'; Thomas (yellow card) 83'	Stadium: Stade Louis II; Attendance: 5,502; Referee: Willy Delajod

29 September 2018 8	Angers	0–1	Guingamp	Angers
20:00 CEST (UTC+2)	Bahoken (yellow card) 6'; Thomas (yellow card) 27'; Bamba (yellow card) 41'	Report	Benezet (yellow card) 38', (goal) 45+2'; Rebocho (yellow card) 51'; Julan (yellow card) 60'	Stadium: Stade Raymond Kopa; Attendance: 9,483; Referee: Nicolas Rainville

6 October 2018 9	Angers	2–2	Strasbourg	Angers
20:00 CEST (UTC+2)	Reine-Adélaïde (yellow card) 61'; Capelle 58'; Thomas 90+3'	Report	Mothiba 2', 40'; Pablo Martinez (yellow card) 45'; Stefan Mitrović (yellow card) 49'; Martin (yellow card) 61'; Sels (yellow card) 76'; Grimm (yellow card) 88'	Stadium: Stade Raymond Kopa; Attendance: 8,930; Referee: Johan Hamel

20 October 2018 10	Reims	1–1	Angers	Reims
20:00 CEST (UTC+2)	Romao (yellow card) 56'; Chavarría 73'	Report	Traoré 36'	Stadium: Stade Auguste Delaune; Attendance: 10,954; Referee: Eric Wattellier

27 October 2018 11	Angers	1–2	Lyon	Angers
17:00 CEST (UTC+2)	I. Traoré (red card) 34'; Pavlović (yellow card) 39'; López (yellow card) 85', (goal) 89'	Report	Marcelo (yellow card) 13'; Ndombele (yellow card) 58'; Aouar 63'; Marçal (yellow card) 73'; B. Traoré (yellow card) 81'; Depay 87'; Rafael (yellow card) 90+3'	Stadium: Stade Raymond Kopa; Attendance: 14,186; Referee: Ruddy Buquet

4 November 2018 12	Saint-Étienne	4–3	Angers	Saint-Étienne
17:00 CET (UTC+1)	Diony 26'; Debuchy 45+1'; Nordin (yellow card) 50'; Manceau 73' (o.g.); Hamouma 89'	Report	Pavlović 24'; Reine-Adélaïde (yellow card) 29'; Tait 45+4'; Bahoken 71'	Stadium: Stade Geoffroy-Guichard; Attendance: 22,983; Referee: Thomas Léonard

10 November 2018 13	Angers	1–0	Montpellier	Angers
20:00 CET (UTC+1)	Thomas 69'; N'Doye (yellow card) 90+1'	Report	Laborde (yellow card) 12'; Delort (yellow card) 50'	Stadium: Stade Raymond Kopa; Attendance: 8,342; Referee: Jérémy Stinat

24 November 2018 14	Nantes	1–1	Angers	Nantes
20:00 CET (UTC+1)	Limbombe (yellow card) 23'; Waris (yellow card) 85', (goal) 89'	Report	Bahoken 5', (yellow card) 36'; Santamaria (yellow card) 25'; Pavlović (yellow card) 72'	Stadium: Stade de la Beaujoire; Attendance: 23,682; Referee: Clément Turpin

1 December 2018 15	Angers	1–1	Caen	Angers
20:00 CET (UTC+1)	N'Doye (yellow card) 5'; Capelle 50'	Report	Diomandé (yellow card) 10'; Fajr (yellow card) 53'; Beauvue 62'	Stadium: Stade Raymond Kopa; Attendance: 8,523; Referee: Willy Delajod

4 December 2018 16	Nice	0–0	Angers	Nice
19:00 CET (UTC+1)	Hérelle (yellow card) 36'; Tameze (yellow card) 60'; Lees-Melou (yellow card) 90'	Report	Pavlović (yellow card) 8'; Butelle (red card) 90+2'	Stadium: Allianz Riviera; Attendance: 14,123; Referee: Hakim Ben el Hadj

8 December 2018 17	Angers	Postponed	Bordeaux	Angers
20:45 CET (UTC+1)		Report		Stadium: Stade Raymond Kopa

15 December 2018 18	Amiens	Postponed	Angers	Amiens
				Stadium: Stade de la Licorne

22 December 2018 19	Angers	1–1	Marseille	Angers
21:00 CET (UTC+1)	Bahoken 35'; Traoré (yellow card) 69'	Report	Lopez (yellow card) 22'; Sanson (yellow card) 43'; Thauvin (yellow card) 69'; Sarr 84'	Stadium: Stade Raymond Kopa; Attendance: 13,473; Referee: Jérôme Brisard

8 January 2019 18	Amiens	0–0	Angers	Amiens
19:00 CET (UTC+1)		Report	Santamaria (yellow card) 40'	Stadium: Stade de la Licorne; Attendance: 10,209; Referee: Johan Hamel

12 January 2019 20	Nîmes	Postponed	Angers	Nîmes
20:00 CET (UTC+1)				Stadium: Stade des Costières

15 January 2019 17	Angers	1–2	Bordeaux	Angers
19:00 CET (UTC+1)	Pavlović 64'; Bamba (yellow card) 74'	Report	Kalu 31'; Karamoh 90+2'	Stadium: Stade Raymond Kopa; Attendance: 10,927; Referee: Eric Wattellier

20 January 2019 21	Angers	1–0	Nantes	Angers
17:00 CET (UTC+1)	N'Doye (yellow card) 49'; Pavlović (yellow card) 82'; Fulgini 90+4'	Report	Girotto (yellow card) 73'; Lucas Lima (yellow card) 78'; Kolo (yellow card) 83'	Stadium: Stade Raymond Kopa; Attendance: 12,412; Referee: Benoît Millot

23 January 2019 20	Nîmes	3–1	Angers	Nîmes
19:00 CET (UTC+1)	Depres 31', 49'; Landre 34'; Briançon (yellow card) 90+1'	Report	Bamba (yellow card) 42'; Tait (yellow card) 58'; Bahoken 90+2' (pen.)	Stadium: Stade des Costières; Attendance: 12,015; Referee: Olivier Thual

27 January 2019 22	Toulouse	0–0	Angers	Toulouse
20:00 CET (UTC+1)	Sylla (yellow card) 82'	Report	Thomas (yellow card) 84'	Stadium: Stadium Municipal; Attendance: 11,296; Referee: Johan Hamel

2 February 2019 23	Angers	1–0	Dijon	Angers
20:00 CET (UTC+1)	Bahoken 27'	Report		Stadium: Stade Raymond Kopa; Attendance: 8,451; Referee: Florent Batta

9 February 2019 24	Strasbourg	1–2	Angers	Strasbourg
20:00 CET (UTC+1)	Mitrović (yellow card) 45+1'; Prcić 87'; Lala (yellow card) 90'	Report	Pavlović (yellow card) 17'; Kanga 35', 55'; Traoré (yellow card) 59'; Cristian (yellow card) 90+2'	Stadium: Stade de la Meinau; Attendance: 25,010; Referee: Amaury Delerue

16 February 2019 25	Angers	3–0	Nice	Angers
20:00 CET (UTC+1)	Bahoken 44' (pen.); Fulgini 47'; Cristian 90+2'	Report	Jallet (yellow card) 43'; Burner (yellow card) 72'	Stadium: Stade Raymond Kopa; Attendance: 11,117; Referee: Frank Schneider

23 February 2019 26	Guingamp	1–0	Angers	Guingamp
20:00 CET (UTC+1)	Ndong (yellow card) 7'; Deaux 90+2', (yellow card) 90+3'	Report	Bamba (yellow card) 47'; Thomas (yellow card) 81'	Stadium: Stade de Roudourou; Attendance: 16,306; Referee: Jérôme Miguelgorry

2 March 2019 27	Angers	2–2	Monaco	Angers
20:00 CET (UTC+1)	Bamba (yellow card) 16'; Tait 22', 45'; Manceau (yellow card) 69'	Report	Falcao 49', 80' (pen.), (yellow card) 81'; Glik (yellow card) 56'; B. Badiashile (yellow card) 62'	Stadium: Stade Raymond Kopa; Attendance: 11,391; Referee: Antony Gautier

10 March 2019 28	Montpellier	2–2	Angers	Montpellier
15:00 CET (UTC+1)	Delort 3'; Skhiri 16', (yellow card) 70'; Mollet (yellow card) 68'; Lasne (yellow card) 81'	Report	Pavlović (red card) 73'; Fulgini 80'; Bahoken 90+1'	Stadium: Stade de la Mosson; Attendance: 10,931; Referee: Karim Abed

16 March 2019 29	Angers	0–0	Amiens	Angers
20:00 CET (UTC+1)	Bahoken (yellow card) 28'	Report	Monconduit (yellow card) 35'; Ghoddos (yellow card) 41'; Otero (yellow card) 55'; Krafth (yellow card) 55'	Stadium: Stade Raymond Kopa; Attendance: 10,427; Referee: Benoît Millot

30 March 2019 30	Marseille	2–2	Angers	Marseille
17:00 CET (UTC+1)	Balotelli 4', 16'; Lopez (yellow card) 23'; Ocampos (yellow card) 26'; Sarr (yellow card) 40' (yellow-red card) 78'	Report	Mangani 36' (pen.), 76' (pen.); Pajot (yellow card) 58'	Stadium: Stade Vélodrome; Attendance: 53,507; Referee: Jérôme Miguelgorry

6 April 2019 31	Angers	3–3	Rennes	Angers
20:00 CEST (UTC+2)	Reine-Adélaïde 47', 90+2'; Bahoken 51'; Tait (yellow card) 62'; Mangani (yellow card) 72'; Butelle (yellow card) 90+3'	Report	Ben Arfa 35', 75' (pen.); André (yellow card) 50'; Niang (yellow card) 58', (goal) 59'; Sarr (yellow card) 64'; Traoré (yellow card) 69'	Stadium: Stade Raymond Kopa; Attendance: 12,378; Referee: Nicolas Rainville

13 April 2019 32	Caen	0–1	Angers	Caen
20:00 CEST (UTC+2)	Oniangué (yellow card) 53'; Crivelli (yellow card) 55'; Deminguet (yellow card) 65'; Djiku (yellow card) 83'	Report	Reine-Adélaïde 61'; Capelle (yellow card) 74'	Stadium: Stade Michel d'Ornano; Attendance: 17,175; Referee: Jérémy Stinat

19 April 2019 33	Lyon	2–1	Angers	Décines-Charpieu
20:45 CEST (UTC+2)	Depay 14'; Terrier 39'	Report	Mangani (yellow card) 58'; Kanga (yellow card) 64'; Tousart 89' (o.g.)	Stadium: Parc Olympique Lyonnais; Attendance: 43,917; Referee: Benoît Millot

28 April 2019 34	Angers	1–1	Reims	Angers
15:00 CEST (UTC+2)	Manceau 71'	Report	Abdelhamid (yellow card) 19'; Foket (yellow card) 56'; Cafaro 63'; Rahman (yellow card) 88'	Stadium: Stade Raymond Kopa; Attendance: 11,464; Referee: Karim Abed

4 May 2019 35	Bordeaux	0–1	Angers	Bordeaux
20:00 CEST (UTC+2)	Lauray (yellow card) 38'; Youssouf (yellow card) 83'	Report	Bahoken 40'	Stadium: Matmut Atlantique; Attendance: 18,584; Referee: Nicolas Rainville

11 May 2019 36	Angers	1–2	Paris Saint-Germain	Angers
17:00 CEST (UTC+2)	Tait 87'	Report	Neymar 20'; Di María 58'; Marquinhos (red card) 85'	Stadium: Stade Raymond Kopa; Attendance: 14,728; Referee: Florent Batta

18 May 2019 37	Lille	5–0	Angers	Villeneuve-d'Ascq
21:00 CEST (UTC+2)	Ikoné 2'; Pépé 14', 76' (pen.); Bamba 70'; Luiz Araújo 90', (yellow card) 90'	Report	Pavlović (yellow card) 24'; Pajot (yellow card) 39'; Aït-Nouri (yellow card) 75'	Stadium: Stade Pierre-Mauroy; Attendance: 42,704; Referee: François Letexier

24 May 2019 38	Angers	1–1	Saint-Étienne	Angers
21:05 CEST (UTC+2)	Moulin 70' (o.g.); El Melali (yellow card) 89'	Report	Nordin 64'; Kolodziejczak (yellow card) 71'	Stadium: Stade Raymond Kopa; Attendance: 16,011; Referee: Johan Hamel

=== Coupe de France ===
5 January 2019 Round of 64	ES Viry-Châtillon	1–0	Angers	Viry-Châtillon
13:00 CET (UTC+1)	Keita (yellow card) 24'; Marcilla (yellow card) 32'; Sacko 50'; Djoko Ketchateng (yellow card) 61'; Bensaidi (yellow card) 90+1'	Report	Mangani (yellow card) 70'	Stadium: Stade Henri Longuet; Attendance: 1,363; Referee: François Letexier

=== Coupe de la Ligue ===
31 October 2018 Round of 32	Guingamp	0–0 (3–2 p)	Angers	Guingamp
21:05 CET (UTC+1)		Report		Stadium: Stade de Roudourou; Attendance: 11,630; Referee: Karim Abed
	Penalties
	Eboa Eboa (penalty missed); Coco (penalty scored); Ngbakoto (penalty missed); Fofana (penalty scored); Blas (penalty scored)		(penalty missed) Kanga; (penalty missed) Capelle; (penalty missed) Bertrand; (penalty scored) Santamaria; (penalty scored) Fulgini
