= Scouting and Guiding in Senegal =

Scouting and Guiding associations in Senegal

The Scout and Guide movement in Senegal is served by

- Confédération Sénégalaise du Scoutisme, umbrella organisation, member of the World Organization of the Scout Movement
  - Association des Scouts et Guides du Sénégal, also member of the World Association of Girl Guides and Girl Scouts
  - Eclaireuses et Eclaireurs du Sénégal
- Scouts et guides musulmans du Sénégal
