= Nicolas Ambroise N'Diaye =

Commissaire Général of Scoutisme d'Afrique Occidentale Française

Nicolas Ambroise N'diaye (-‡2002 to 2005), born in French West Africa, served as the Commissaire Général of Scoutisme d'Afrique Occidentale Française, as well as Commissaire Général of the Scouts et Guides du Sénégal and the President of the Confédération Sénégalaise du Scoutisme.

In 1998, he was awarded the 271st Bronze Wolf, the only distinction of the World Organization of the Scout Movement, awarded by the World Scout Committee for exceptional services to world Scouting.
