= Mouhamed Ndiaye =

Mouhamed Ndiaye may refer to:

- Mouhamed Alga Ndiaye, Senegalese basketball player
- Mouhamed N'Diaye, Senegalese footballer

== See also ==
- Mohamed N'Diaye
