= Njie =

Njie, N'jie, or Njai (English spelling in Gambia), N'Diaye (French spelling in Senegal), N'diay (German) or Njaay (Serer spelling in Senegambia) is a Serer patronym. It is worn by both Serer and Wolof people.
Notable persons with this surname include:

== Njie ==
- Abdou Njie (born 1992), Gambian footballer
- Adama Njie (born 1978), Gambian runner
- Al Njie (born 1955), American soccer player
- Alhaji Njie (a.k.a. Biri Biri; 1948–2020), Gambian footballer; father of Yusupha Njie
- Alieu Badara Njie (1904–1982), Gambian civil servant, politician, and ambassador
- Allen Njie (born 1999), Liberian footballer
- Baboucarr Njie (born 1955), Gambian footballer
- Barra Njie (born 2001), Swedish basketballer
- Bubacar Njie Kambi (born 1988), Gambian footballer
- Bilal Njie (born 1988), Norwegian footballer; brother of Moussa Njie
- Fallou Njie (born 1999), Gambian footballer
- Fatou Mass Jobe-Njie (born ?), Gambian politician, ambassador, banker, and charity executive
- Faye Njie (born 1993), Gambian-born Finnish judoka and Olympics competitor
- Haddy Njie (born 1979), Norwegian singer, songwriter, and journalist
- Isatou Njie-Saidy (born 1952), Gambian politician and radio presenter
- John Charles Njie (born ?), Gambian actor
- Mambury Njie (born 1962), Gambian economist and politician
- Marie Samuel Njie (fl. 20th century), Gambian griot singer, composer, and political figure
- Momar Njie (born 1975), Gambian footballer and trainer
- Momodou Baboucar Njie (1929–2009), Gambian politician and business executive
- Momodou Lion Njie (born 2001), Gambian footballer
- Moussa Njie (born 1995), Norwegian footballer; brother of Bilal Njie
- Mustapha Njie (born 1996), Gambian footballer
- Nancy Njie (1965–2025), Gambian politician
- Sainey Njie (born 2001), Gambian footballer
- Sally Njie (1932–2020), Gambian librarian
- Seedy Njie (footballer) (born 1994), British footballer
- Seedy Njie (politician) (born 1984), Gambian politician
- Sirra Wally Ndow-Njie (born ?), Gambian politician
- Yusupha Njie (born 1994), Gambian footballer; son of Alhaji Njie

== N'Jie ==
- Momodou Bello N'Jie (born 1969), Gambian runner and Olympics competitor
- Clinton N'Jie (born 1993), Cameroonian footballer
- Louise N'Jie (1922–2014), Gambian teacher, feminist, and politician
- Pierre Sarr N'Jie (1909–1993), Gambia lawyer and politician; first Gambian head of state after declared independence from Britain

== See also ==
- Ndiaye (disambiguation)
- N'Diaye (disambiguation)
