= Wilfried Kanga =

Ivorian footballer (born 1998)

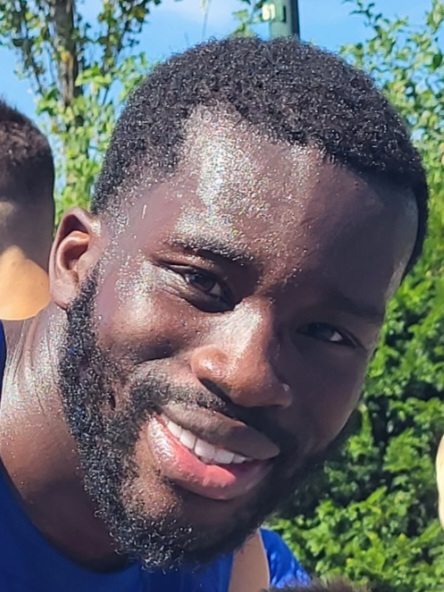
- Kanga in 2022

Personal information
- Full name: Aka Wilfried Julien Kanga
- Date of birth: 21 February 1998 (age 28)
- Place of birth: Montreuil, France
- Height: 1.89 m (6 ft 2 in)
- Positions: Winger; forward

Team information
- Current team: Al Fateh
- Number: 9

Youth career
- 2004–2007: FCM Garges-lès-Gonesse
- 2007–2009: FC Villepinte
- 2009–2010: Sevran FC
- 2010–2016: Paris Saint-Germain

Senior career*
Years	Team	Apps	(Gls)
2016–2017	Paris Saint-Germain	0	(0)
2016–2017	→ Créteil (loan)	24	(5)
2017–2020	Angers II	8	(8)
2017–2020	Angers	33	(2)
2020–2021	Kayserispor	14	(2)
2021–2022	Young Boys	33	(15)
2022–2025	Hertha BSC	23	(2)
2023–2024	→ Standard Liège (loan)	36	(12)
2024–2025	→ Cardiff City (loan)	15	(0)
2025	Dinamo Zagreb	15	(3)
2025–2026	Gent	35	(12)
2026–	Al Fateh	10	(3)

International career^{‡}
2016	Ivory Coast U20	1	(0)
2018	France U20	4	(1)
2022–	Ivory Coast	2	(0)
- * Club domestic league appearances and goals as of 18 October 2026 ‡ National team caps and goals as of 17:32, 12 November 2022 (UTC)

Aka Wilfried Julien Kanga (born 21 February 1998) is a professional footballer who plays as a forward for Saudi Pro League side Al Fateh. Born in France, he plays for the Ivory Coast national team.

== Club career ==
Kanga is a youth product of PSG, and moved on loan to US Créteil-Lusitanos, after signing his first professional contract. After his successful season in the Championnat National, Kanga was transferred to Angers in the Ligue 1. He made his professional debut for Angers, in a Ligue 1 1–1 tie with Lille on 27 August 2017.

On 30 July 2022, Kanga signed a four-year contract with Hertha BSC in Germany.

On 7 August 2023, Kanga moved on a season-long loan to Standard Liège in Belgium.

On 30 July 2024, Kanga joined Cardiff City on loan.

== International career ==
Kanga was born in France and is Ivorian by descent, and represented the Ivory Coast U20s in a 3–2 friendly victory over the Qatar U20s in March 2016.

Kanga switched and represented the France U20s at the 2018 Toulon Tournament. He scored on his debut against the South Korea U20s on 28 May 2018.

Kanga switched back to represent the senior Ivory Coast national team in September 2022, and debuted with them in a friendly 2–1 win over Togo national team on 25 September 2022.

== Career statistics ==
=== Club ===
As of 23 July 2026

Club	Season	League			National cup (Note: Includes Coupe de France, Turkish Cup, Swiss Cup, DFB-Pokal, Belgian Cup, FA Cup)		League cup (Note: Includes Coupe de la Ligue, EFL Cup)		Continental		Other		Total	
Club	Season	Division	Apps	Goals	Apps	Goals	Apps	Goals	Apps	Goals	Apps	Goals	Apps	Goals
Créteil (loan)	2016–17	Championnat National	24	5	—		—		—		—		24	5
Angers	2017–18	Ligue 1	9	0	—		—		—		—		9	0
Angers	2018–19	Ligue 1	18	2	1	0	1	0	—		—		20	2
Angers	2019–20	Ligue 1	4	0	0	0	1	1	—		—		5	1
Angers	2020–21	Ligue 1	2	0	—		—		—		—		2	0
Angers	Total		33	2	1	0	2	1	—		—		36	3
Kayserispor	2020–21	Süper Lig	14	2	1	1	—		—		—		15	3
Young Boys	2021–22	Swiss Super League	31	12	3	4	—		8	0	—		42	16
Young Boys	2022–23	Swiss Super League	2	3	0	0	—		1	0	—		3	3
Young Boys	Total		33	15	3	4	—		9	0	—		45	19
Hertha BSC	2022–23	1. Bundesliga	23	2	0	0	—		—		—		23	2
Standard Liège (loan)	2023–24	Belgian Pro League	31	12	1	0	—		—		—		32	12
Cardiff City (loan)	2024–25	EFL Championship	15	0	0	0	1	0	—		0	0	16	0
Dinamo Zagreb	2024–25	Croatian Football League	15	3	1	0	—		0	0	—		16	3
Gent	2025–26	Belgian Pro League	35	12	2	0	—		—		—		37	12
Gent	2026–27	Belgian Pro League	0	0	0	0	—		1	0	—		1	0
Gent	Total		35	12	2	0	—		1	0	—		38	12
Career total			223	53	9	5	3	1	10	0	0	0	245	59

=== International ===
As of match played 27 September 2022

Appearances and goals by national team and year
National team	Year	Apps	Goals
Ivory Coast	2022	2	0
Total		2	0
