= Rayan Aït-Nouri =

Footballer (born 2001)

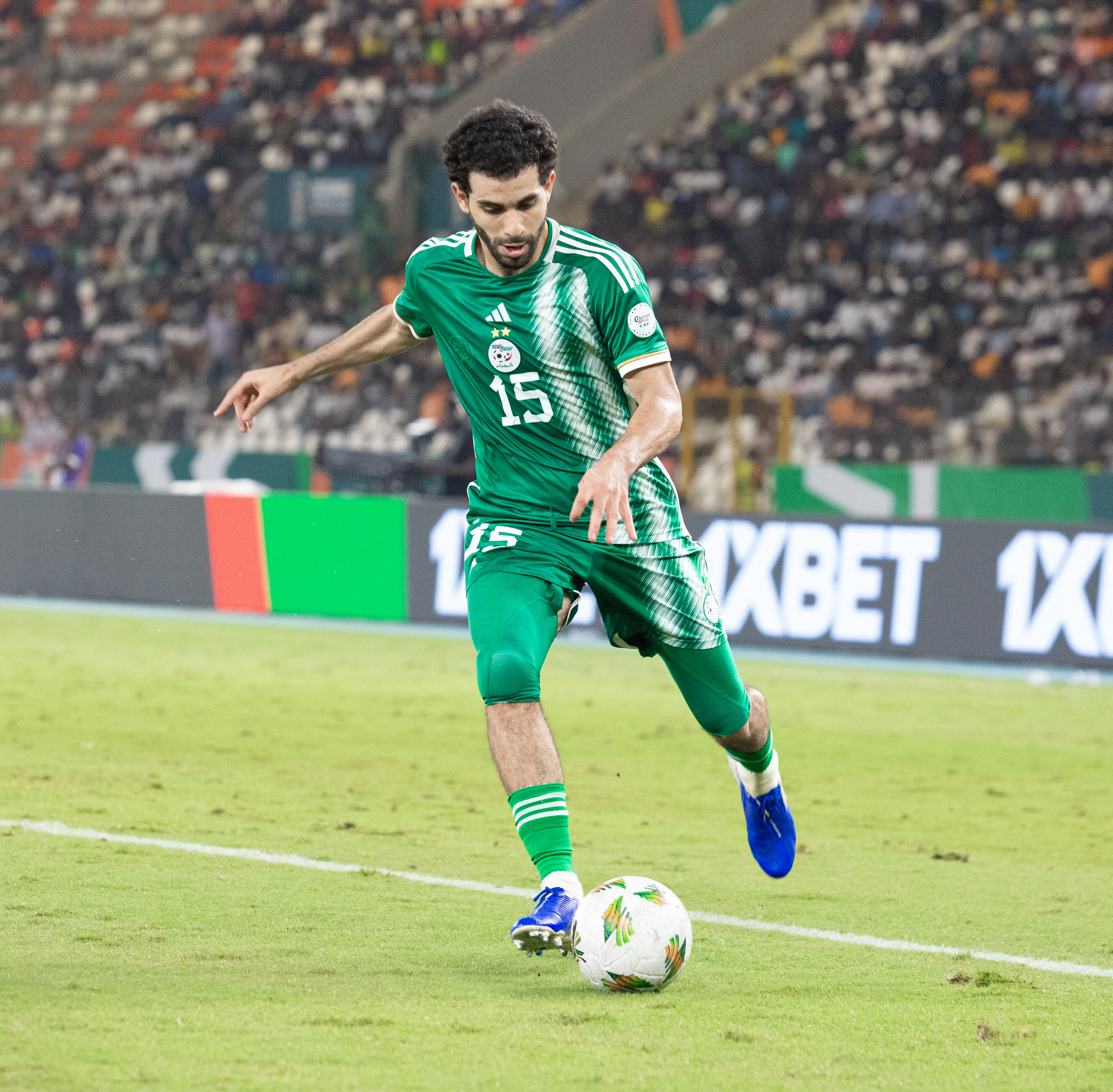
- Aït-Nouri playing for Algeria at the 2023 Africa Cup of Nations

Personal information
- Full name: Rayan Aït-Nouri
- Date of birth: 6 June 2001 (age 25)
- Place of birth: Montreuil, France
- Height: 1.80 m (5 ft 11 in)
- Positions: Left-back; left wing-back

Team information
- Current team: Manchester City
- Number: 21

Youth career
- 2009–2012: AS Val de Fontenay
- 2012–2014: ASF Le Perreux 94
- 2014–2016: Paris
- 2016–2018: Angers

Senior career*
| Years | Team | Apps | (Gls) |
| 2018–2019 | Angers II | 11 | (0) |
| 2018–2021 | Angers | 23 | (0) |
| 2020–2021 | → Wolverhampton Wanderers (loan) | 21 | (1) |
| 2021–2025 | Wolverhampton Wanderers | 114 | (8) |
| 2025– | Manchester City | 17 | (0) |

International career^{‡}
| 2018–2019 | France U18 | 10 | (0) |
| 2018 | France U19 | 2 | (0) |
| 2019–2020 | France U21 | 5 | (0) |
| 2023– | Algeria | 34 | (0) |
- * Club domestic league appearances and goals as of 23:45, 24 May 2026 (UTC) ‡ National team caps and goals as of 2 July 2026 (UTC)

Rayan Aït-Nouri (Arabic: رَيَّان آيَت نُورِيّ; born 6 June 2001) is a professional footballer who plays as a left-back or a left wing-back for Premier League club Manchester City. Born in France, he plays for the Algeria national team.

== Early life ==
Aït-Nouri was born in Montreuil, in the eastern suburbs of Paris. He grew up in Fontenay-sous-Bois, in the Val-de-Marne department.

== Club career ==
=== Angers ===
Aït-Nouri is a graduate of the Angers youth academy, which he joined from Paris FC in July 2016 in return for covering Aït-Nouri's tuition fees of €5,000. He signed his professional contract aged 16 in February 2018 and made his first team debut as a substitute in a 3–1 loss to Paris Saint-Germain on 25 August 2018.

After making three appearances in the 2018–19 season, he became the team's first choice left-back in the following season until breaking his jaw in a game against Nice in January 2020. At the conclusion of the French league season, which was ended early due to the coronavirus pandemic, he signed a new contract that was due to keep him at Angers until 2023.

=== Wolverhampton Wanderers ===
On 4 October 2020, Aït-Nouri moved on a season-long loan deal to Premier League club Wolverhampton Wanderers, with the club having an option of a permanent purchase. Twenty-six days later, he scored his first goal in professional football, on his league debut in a 2–0 home win over Crystal Palace.

On 9 July 2021, Aït-Nouri made a permanent move to Wolves for £9.8 million, on a five-year deal with an option for a further year. He scored his second goal for Wolves in his 50th appearance for the club, on 15 May 2022, in a 1–1 home Premier League draw with Norwich City.

On 26 December 2022, Aït-Nouri scored the winning Wolves goal in Julen Lopetegui's first Premier League game as Wolves' new head coach away at Everton; this was Aït-Nouri's first (and only) league goal of the 2022–23 season.

Aït-Nouri made his 100th competitive appearance for Wolves in a 4–2 away win against Chelsea in the Premier League on 4 February 2024. Aït-Nouri was the author of Wolves' second goal of the game, his shot being deflected into the Chelsea goal by Axel Disasi.

=== Manchester City ===
On 9 June 2025, Aït-Nouri made a permanent move to fellow Premier League side Manchester City on a five-year deal running till summer of 2030 for a reported initial fee of £31.8 million with potential £5.2 million in bonuses. Aït-Nouri made his City debut on 22 June in the FIFA Club World Cup, starting in a 6–0 group stage win over Al Ain. On 16 August, he made his Premier League debut for City in their opening game of the season, a 4–0 away victory over his former club Wolverhampton Wanderers.

== International career ==
Aït-Nouri holds French and Algerian nationalities. He was a youth international for France, having represented the French under-18 and under-21 teams. In January 2023, he switched to represent Algeria internationally. He made his debut with the Algerian national team in the 2023 Africa Cup of Nations qualification match against Niger, in Nelson Mandela Stadium, on 23 March 2023.

In December 2023, he was named in Algeria's squad for the 2023 Africa Cup of Nations.

On 31 May 2026, Aït-Nouri was named in Vladimir Petković's 26-man Algeria squad for the 2026 FIFA World Cup.

== Career statistics ==
=== Club ===
As of match played 17 September 2026

Appearances and goals by club, season and competition
| Club | Season | League | | | National cup (Note: Includes FA Cup) | | League cup (Note: Includes EFL Cup) | | Europe | | Other | | Total | |
| Club | Season | Division | Apps | Goals | Apps | Goals | Apps | Goals | Apps | Goals | Apps | Goals | Apps | Goals |
|---|---|---|---|---|---|---|---|---|---|---|---|---|---|---|
| Angers II | 2017–18 | Championnat National 3 | 4 | 0 | — | | — | | — | | — | | 4 | 0 |
| Angers II | 2018–19 | Championnat National 3 | 6 | 0 | — | | — | | — | | — | | 6 | 0 |
| Angers II | Total | | 10 | 0 | — | | — | | — | | — | | 10 | 0 |
| Angers | 2018–19 | Ligue 1 | 3 | 0 | 0 | 0 | 0 | 0 | — | | — | | 3 | 0 |
| Angers | 2019–20 | Ligue 1 | 17 | 0 | 0 | 0 | 0 | 0 | — | | — | | 17 | 0 |
| Angers | 2020–21 | Ligue 1 | 3 | 0 | 0 | 0 | — | | — | | — | | 3 | 0 |
| Angers | Total | | 23 | 0 | 0 | 0 | 0 | 0 | — | | — | | 23 | 0 |
| Wolverhampton Wanderers (loan) | 2020–21 | Premier League | 21 | 1 | 3 | 0 | 0 | 0 | — | | — | | 24 | 1 |
| Wolverhampton Wanderers | 2021–22 | Premier League | 23 | 1 | 2 | 0 | 2 | 0 | — | | — | | 27 | 1 |
| Wolverhampton Wanderers | 2022–23 | Premier League | 21 | 1 | 2 | 0 | 4 | 1 | — | | — | | 27 | 2 |
| Wolverhampton Wanderers | 2023–24 | Premier League | 33 | 2 | 3 | 1 | 2 | 0 | — | | — | | 38 | 3 |
| Wolverhampton Wanderers | 2024–25 | Premier League | 37 | 4 | 3 | 1 | 1 | 0 | — | | — | | 41 | 5 |
| Wolverhampton Wanderers | Wolves total | | 135 | 9 | 13 | 2 | 9 | 1 | — | | — | | 157 | 12 |
| Manchester City | 2024–25 | Premier League | — | | — | | — | | — | | 3 (Note: Appearances in FIFA Club World Cup) | 0 | 3 | 0 |
| Manchester City | 2025–26 | Premier League | 17 | 0 | 2 | 0 | 3 | 0 | 6 (Note: Appearances in UEFA Champions League) | 0 | — | | 28 | 0 |
| Manchester City | 2026–27 | Premier League | 0 | 0 | 0 | 0 | 1 | 0 | 1 | 0 | 0 | 0 | 2 | 0 |
| Manchester City | Total | | 17 | 0 | 2 | 0 | 4 | 0 | 7 | 0 | 3 | 0 | 33 | 0 |
| Career total | | | 185 | 9 | 15 | 2 | 13 | 1 | 7 | 0 | 3 | 0 | 223 | 12 |

=== International ===
As of match played 2 July 2026

Appearances and goals by national team and year
| National team | Year | Apps | Goals |
|---|---|---|---|
| Algeria | 2023 | 4 | 0 |
| Algeria | 2024 | 12 | 0 |
| Algeria | 2025 | 8 | 0 |
| Algeria | 2026 | 10 | 0 |
| Total | | 34 | 0 |

== Honours ==
Manchester City

- FA Cup: 2025–26
- EFL Cup: 2025–26

=== Individual ===
- IFFHS Africa Team of the Year: 2024
