= Ludovic Butelle =

French footballer (born 1983)

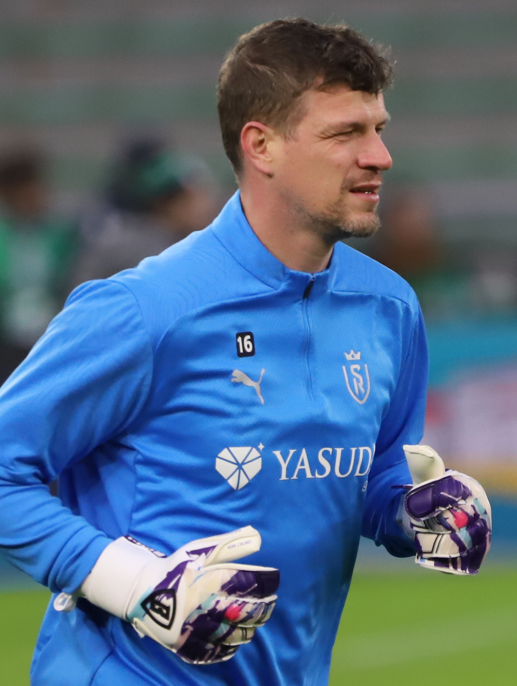
- Butelle in 2025 with Reims

Personal information
- Full name: Ludovic Jean-Luc Butelle
- Date of birth: 3 April 1983 (age 43)
- Place of birth: Reims, France
- Height: 1.88 m (6 ft 2 in)
- Position: Goalkeeper

Team information
- Current team: OCPAM

Youth career
- 1989–1991: FC Carnot Chatillons
- 1991–1997: MJEP Cormontreuil
- 1997–2001: Metz

Senior career*
Years	Team	Apps	(Gls)
2001–2004	Metz	53	(0)
2004–2009	Valencia	9	(0)
2005	→ Hércules (loan)	1	(0)
2007–2008	→ Valladolid (loan)	8	(0)
2008–2009	→ Lille (loan)	4	(0)
2009–2011	Lille	10	(0)
2010–2011	→ Nîmes (loan)	37	(0)
2011–2014	Arles-Avignon	106	(0)
2014–2015	Angers	53	(0)
2016–2018	Club Brugge	59	(0)
2018–2021	Angers	81	(0)
2021–2023	Red Star	51	(0)
2023–2025	Reims	0	(0)
2023–2025	Reims B	1	(0)
2025–	OCPAM	0	(0)

International career
2003–2004	France U21	3	(0)
- * Club domestic league appearances and goals as of 17 May 2025

Ludovic Jean-Luc Butelle (born 3 April 1983) is a French professional footballer who plays as a goalkeeper for Championnat National 3 club OCPAM.

== Club career ==
Born in Reims, Butelle began his career at Metz, in 2001–02's Ligue 1, appearing in six matches. He became a regular subsequently, after which he was signed by Spanish club Valencia in July 2004 touted as a possible replacement for aging Andrés Palop and Santiago Cañizares; he also served a six-month loan at Hércules for the rest of his first season.

From 2005 to 2007, with Palop departed, Butelle eventually became backup, replacing another veteran, Juan Luis Mora. On 29 November 2006, after making his La Liga debut on 19 March 2006 in a 1–2 away loss against Racing de Santander, his sole in that campaign, he extended his contract – due to expire in June 2009 – for a further three years.

For 2007–08, Butelle was again loaned, this time to fellow league team Real Valladolid. After starting as first-choice, he eventually lost the battle with youngster Sergio Asenjo (18) and veteran Alberto (38); after considering a return to France for the remainder of the campaign, he eventually stayed until his loan expired.

However, Butelle would be loaned once more for 2008–09, now to French top division side Lille. At the season's close, the move was made permanent.

In the following years, Butelle competed in his country's Ligue 2, with Nîmes, Arles-Avignon and Angers. As Arles-Avignon's goalkeeper, Butelle was elected Goalkeeper of the Year in Ligue 2 for three consecutive seasons.

He signed a three-year contract with Angers succeeding veteran Grégory Malicki. Angers achieved promotion to the Ligue 1 in 2015 after 21 years.

After a successful Ligue 1 debut with Angers, boasting a surprising third place in December 2015, Butelle signed a contract with Belgian side Club Brugge during the 2015–6 winter transfer window. Already after half a year Butelle was able to celebrate Club Bruges's first championship since 2005. He was elected Goalkeeper of the Year 2016.

After a two-year spell at Club Bruges, Butelle returned to Angers in January 2018.

== Career statistics ==
As of match played 16 May 2026

Appearances and goals by club, season and competition
Club	Season	League			Cup		League Cup		Europe		Other		Total	
Club	Season	Division	Apps	Goals	Apps	Goals	Apps	Goals	Apps	Goals	Apps	Goals	Apps	Goals
Metz	2001–02	Division 1	6	0	0	0	0	0	—		—		6	0
Metz	2002–03	Ligue 2	20	0	5	0	4	0	—		—		29	0
Metz	2003–04	Ligue 1	27	0	1	0	2	0	—		—		30	0
Metz	Total		53	0	6	0	6	0	—		—		65	0
Valencia	2004–05	La Liga	0	0	0	0	—		0	0	—		0	0
Valencia	2005–06	La Liga	1	0	3	0	—		0	0	—		4	0
Valencia	2006–07	La Liga	8	0	3	0	—		1	0	—		12	0
Valencia	Total		9	0	6	0	—		1	0	—		16	0
Valladolid (loan)	2007–08	La Liga	8	0	1	0	—		—		—		9	0
Lille (loan)	2008–09	Ligue 1	4	0	4	0	1	0	—		—		9	0
Lille	2009–10	Ligue 1	10	0	1	0	0	0	7	0	—		18	0
Lille	Lille total		14	0	5	0	1	0	7	0	—		27	0
Nîmes (loan)	2010–11	Ligue 2	37	0	3	0	3	0	—		—		43	0
Arles-Avignon	2011–12	Ligue 2	35	0	0	0	1	0	—		—		36	0
Arles-Avignon	2012–13	Ligue 2	34	0	0	0	0	0	—		—		34	0
Arles-Avignon	2013–14	Ligue 2	37	0	0	0	1	0	—		—		38	0
Arles-Avignon	Total		106	0	0	0	2	0	—		—		108	0
Angers	2014–15	Ligue 2	34	0	1	0	0	0	—		—		35	0
Angers	2015–16	Ligue 1	19	0	0	0	0	0	—		—		19	0
Angers	Total		53	0	1	0	0	0	—		—		54	0
Club Brugge	2015–16	Belgian Pro League	18	0	3	0	—		—		—		21	0
Club Brugge	2016–17	Belgian Pro League	36	0	2	0	—		6	0	1	0	45	0
Club Brugge	2017–18	Belgian Pro League	5	0	1	0	—		0	0	—		6	0
Club Brugge	Total		59	0	6	0	—		6	0	1	0	72	0
Angers	2017–18	Ligue 1	19	0	0	0	1	0	—		—		20	0
Angers	2018–19	Ligue 1	36	0	1	0	0	0	—		—		37	0
Angers	2019–20	Ligue 1	26	0	0	0	0	0	—		—		26	0
Angers	2020–21	Ligue 1	0	0	4	0	—		—		—		4	0
Angers	Total		81	0	5	0	1	0	—		—		87	0
Red Star	2021–22	Championnat National	21	0	0	0	—		—		—		21	0
Red Star	2022–23	Championnat National	30	0	0	0	—		—		—		30	0
Red Star	Total		51	0	0	0	—		—		—		51	0
Reims	2023–24	Ligue 1	0	0	0	0	—		—		—		34	0
Reims	2024–25	Ligue 1	0	0	0	0	—		—		0	0	0	0
Reims	Total		0	0	0	0	—		—		0	0	51	0
Reims B	2024–25	Championnat National 3	0	0	—		—		—		—		0	0
OCPAM	2025–26	Championnat National 3	23	0	1	0	—		—		—		24	0
OCPAM	2026–27	Championnat National 2	0	0	0	0	—		—		—		0	0
OCPAM	Total		23	0	1	0	—		—		—		24	0
Career total			494	0	34	0	13	0	14	0	1	0	556	0

== Honours ==
Club Brugge

- Belgian Pro League: 2015–16
- Belgian Super Cup: 2016
- Belgian Cup runner-up: 2015–16
