= Ndiaye =

Ndiaye (pronounced njai) is both a surname and a given name. Its spelling is derived from Njie, a Serer and Wolof patronym. Notable people with the name include:

- Adama Ndiaye, Senegalese fashion designer, also known as Adama Paris
- Aïcha Henriette Ndiaye, Senegalese football manager
- Aminata Mbengue Ndiaye, member of the Pan-African Parliament
- Amy Ndiaye, member of the Parliament of Senegal
- Awa Dioum-Ndiaye (born 1961), Senegalese track and field athlete
- Badara Ndiaye (born 1986), Senegalese visual concept developer and fashion designer
- Chloé Ndiaye, Swiss and Senegalese singer-songwriter and performing artist
- Fatou Ndiaye Sow (1937–2004), Senegalese poet, teacher and children's writer
- Iliman Ndiaye (born 2000), French-Senegalese footballer
- Mamadou Bamba Ndiaye (1949–2020), Senegalese politician
- Marie NDiaye (born 1967), French novelist and playwright
- Mor Talla Ndiaye (born 2008), Senegalese footballer
- Ndiaye Pathé (born 2004), Senegalese footballer
- Papa Alioune Ndiaye (born 1990), Senegalese footballer
- Pape Cherif Ndiaye (born 1996), Senegalese footballer

== See also ==
- N'Diaye (disambiguation)
- Njie (disambiguation)
