= The Gambia National Library =

National library of the Gambia

The Gambia National Library Service Authority
- 13.459591°N 16.584989°W
- Location: Banjul, The Gambia
- Type: National and Public Library
- Established: 1971 (originally 1946)
- Branches: 2

Collection
- Size: 115,500

Access and use
- Circulation: 85
- Members: 276+

Other information
- Director: Bakary Sanyang
- Employees: 32+
- Website: http://www.gnlsa.gov.gm

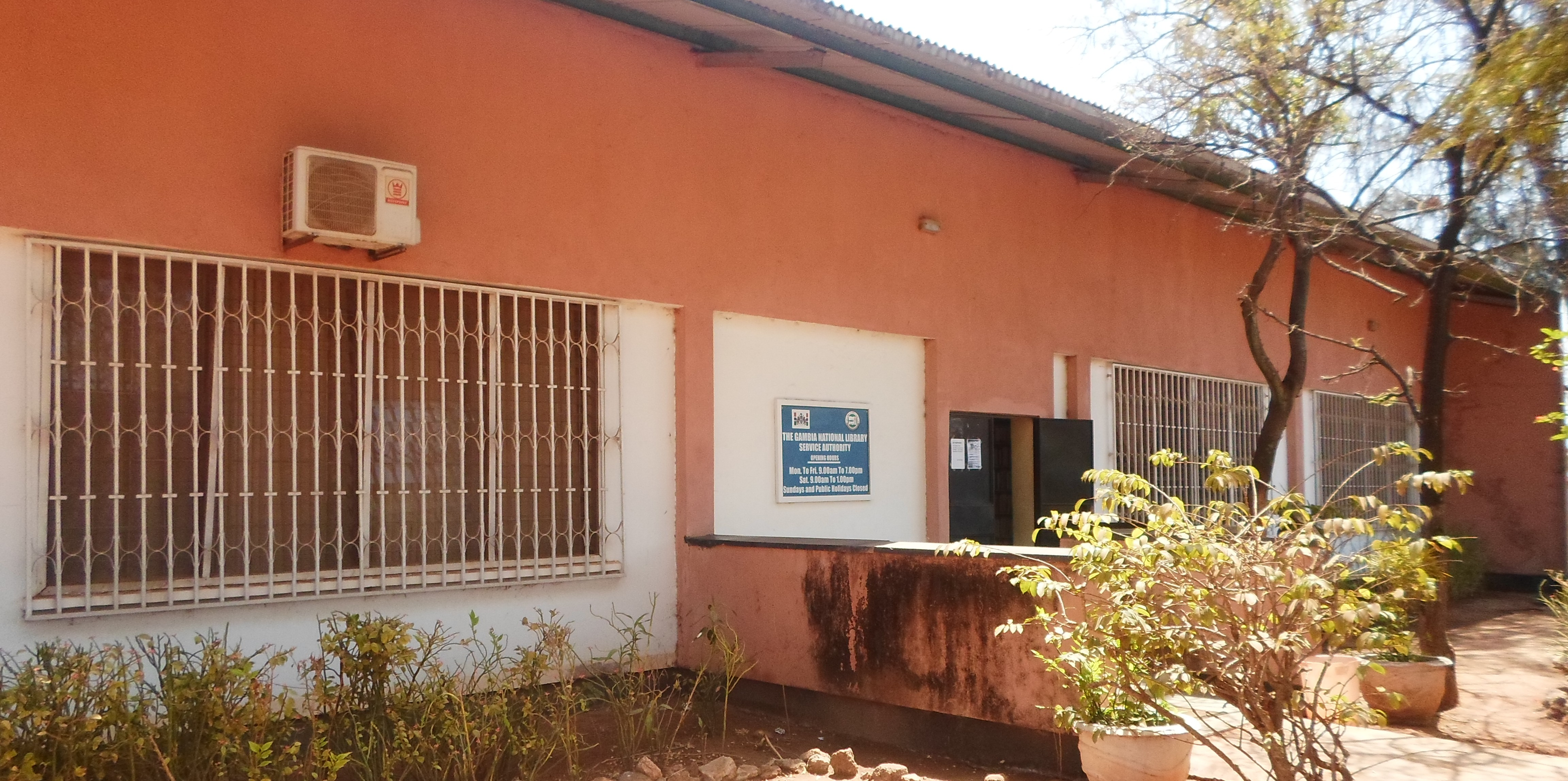
The Gambia National Library

Gambia National Library Service Authority (GNLSA) is located in Banjul, The Gambia on Reg Pye Lane, the road leading to Tobacco Road . The library was originally operated by the British Council till 1946 and was renamed the National Library of The Gambia in 1971. The National Library was gift from Britain to the people of the Gambia and was open by his excellency the President Sir Dawda Kariba Jawara in December 1976. The library is maintained and administered by The Gambia National Library Services Authority (GNLSA). As of 2016, the library had a collection of 115,500 books and 85 periodicals. It had more than 42 staff and more than 276 members.

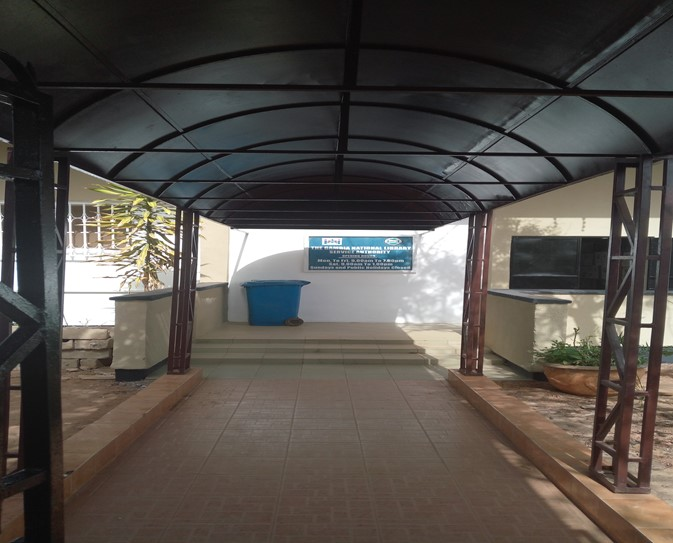

The Gambia National Library was previous operating two branch libraries, one in Brikama and the other one in Basse. The branch in Brikama is located near the Governor's office in Brikama whilst the branch in Basse was permanently closed.

The library was also made the official recorder of legal depository and principal Bibliographic Centre of the nation. Around 2,000 archived materials are stored in the library, which caters mainly to The Gambia and its history. The library is divided into sections, the reference library, adult lending unit, the children's library, periodicals and the Bibliographic unit also known as Gambiana. This made the Gambia National Library Service Authority both a National and a public library. The library was offering bulk school lending service, mobile and mailbox until the early 2000s when the only mobile library vehicle broke down. In 2024 the National library was donated with a new digital center by the friends of the Gambia National library in order to introduce cording system to the youngsters who are interested in computer programming.

== History ==
Library services started in the Gambia in 1944, with Bishop Daly’s subscription library. The library was opened to a few members of the public. Later on, the British Council opened a Library in 1946, at Independence Drive (current location of the National Museum – the National Centre for Arts and Culture). The British Council handed over the Library to the Gambia Government, and the present library structure was opened on 15 December 1976, by former President Sir Dawda Kairaba Jawara. When the transfer took place, the library had a collection of 25,000 books and 500 monographs. Sally Njie was appointed Chief Librarian in 1963. The British Government donated £575,000 to The Gambia for maintaining the library in 1974 . The library is maintained and administered by The Gambia National Library Services Authority (GNLSA). During the 1970s, the collections in the library was nearly doubled. The Gambia National Library Services Authority was established in 2009 by an Act of parliament, which gave more powers and autonomy to the library. Book Aid International is an overseas partner of the library, in collaboration with whom, the library donated books to the medical branch of University of Gambia. The library acquires all its collections through donations, gifts, purchases, government agencies and survey.

According to the United Nations, as of 2013 an estimated 41 percent of adult Gambians are literate.

== Vision ==
An inspiring beacon of life-long learning aimed at bringing knowledge alive, lighting up the imagination, and creating possibilities for a vibrant and creative nation.

- Digital Transformation - Expanding digital collection, e-learning platforms, and online access to resources.
- Community Engagement - Strengthening outreach programs to promote literacy, education, and indigenous knowledge preservation.
- Capacity Buildings - Training library professionals, supporting research, and developing innovative library services.
- Lifelong Learning - supporting personal, education, and professional growth across all ages.
- Inclusivity and Equity - welcoming and serving diverse population and services that meet their unique needs.

== Mission ==
To provide a reliable, accessible and world-class library and information service geared towards the transformation of The Gambia into an enlightened and knowledge-based society.

== Board of Directors ==
The Board consist of seven (7) members including a Chairman, Permanent Secretary (MoBSE), Permanent Secretary (Ministry of Information), representative of the Gambia Teachers’ Union, two (2) representatives from Gambian Writers (creative and artistic), as well as the Director General (GNLSA) as Secretary.

== Functions ==
The Gambia National Library Service Authority Act 2009 established the Gambia National Library Service Authority as a public service body. It serves the function of public and national library services. The library has facilities for photocopying, school service and has ISBN service for books published in the Gambia, also ISSN for functional newspapers in the country such as The Standard, Foroyaa, Gambia Daily, the Point, voice and recently the observer 24. They also supply papers to the library after every publication and access to UNESCO publications. The library co-ordinates the library and information issues at the national level and can impose penalties for non-adherence. A branch of the library was opened in Brikama in Western Division in 1990. The library was also made the official recorder of legal depository and principal Bibliographic Centre of the nation. Around 2,000 archived materials are stored in the library, which caters mainly to The Gambia and its history. The library offers an adult library, children's library, bulk school lending service, mobile and mailbox service. The library also stored major and historical maps of The Gambia and its towns, audio tapes and press cutting of major events in the history of the country.

=== Director General ===
Mr. Bakary Sanyang was appointed as the Director General of the Gambia National Library Service Authority in 2022 after the expired of the three-year contract of the former D.G. Mrs. Matilda Johnson.

=== Digital Centre ===
The Gambia National Library on Tuesday 30 April inaugurated its digital library center. The project is sponsored by an NGO call the Friends of the Gambia National Library. The digital center will provide daily after-school activities, coding classes, free WiFi for the community. It is also intended to serve as career guidance and job workshops, senior citizen tech education, and information services for the visually impaired. The Digital Center will significantly benefit the development of the Gambia National Library by modernising access to information, expanding digital literacy, preserving cultural heritage, and facilitating research. It will also enhance the library's ability to serve a broader audience, including remote users, and support national education and development initiatives.

== See also ==
- List of national libraries
