= Stéphane Bahoken =

Cameroonian footballer (born 1992)

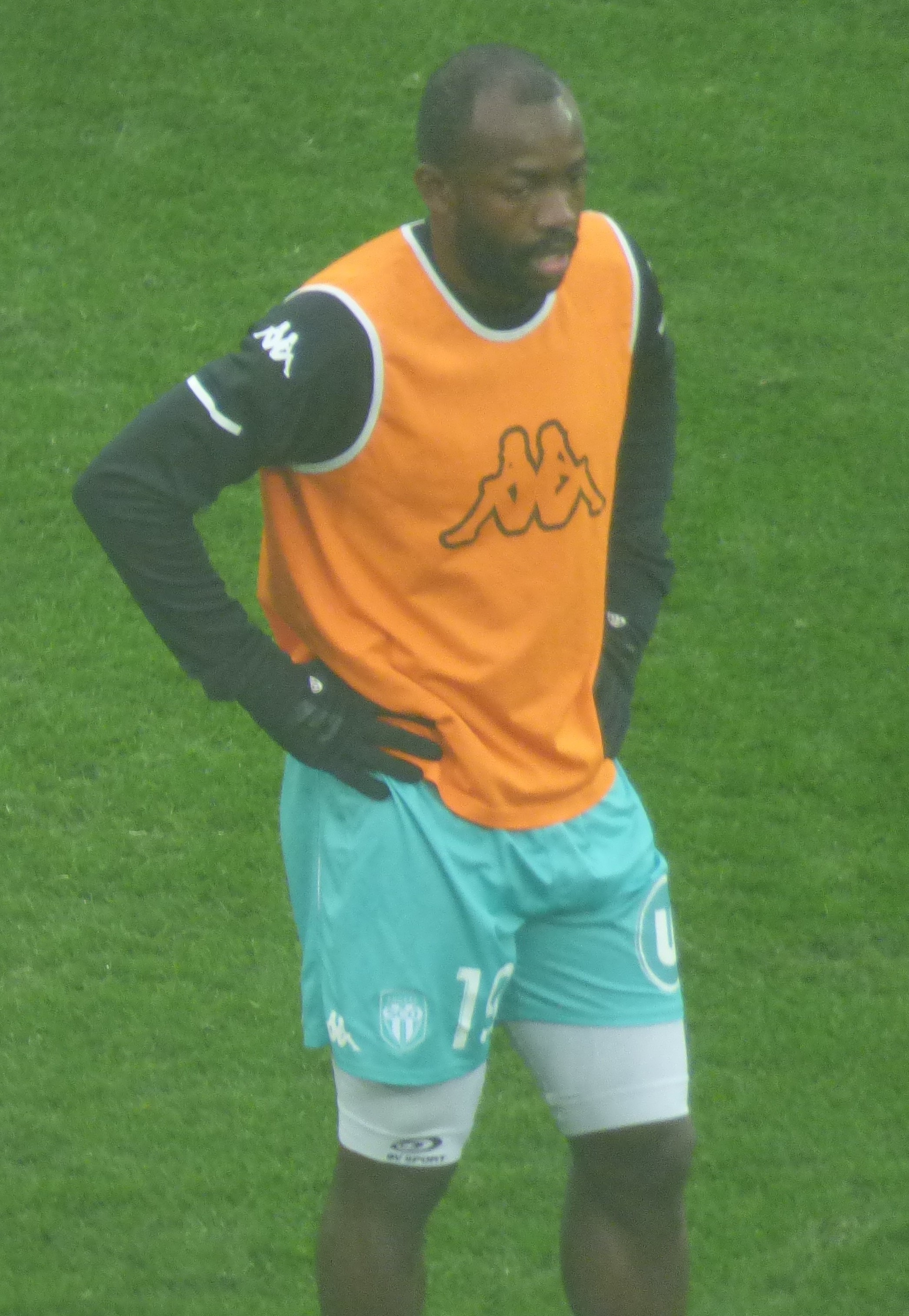
- Bahoken in 2020

Personal information
- Full name: Stéphane Cédric Bahoken
- Date of birth: 28 May 1992 (age 34)
- Place of birth: Grasse, France
- Height: 1.85 m (6 ft 1 in)
- Position: Forward

Team information
- Current team: Kyzylzhar
- Number: 13

Youth career
- 1998–2000: ASPTT Plascassier Grasse
- 2000–2004: Grasse
- 2004–2011: Nice

Senior career*
| Years | Team | Apps | (Gls) |
| 2011–2014 | Nice | 16 | (2) |
| 2012–2013 | Nice B | 5 | (5) |
| 2013–2014 | → St Mirren (loan) | 5 | (0) |
| 2014–2018 | Strasbourg | 113 | (24) |
| 2014–2018 | Strasbourg B | 1 | (1) |
| 2018–2022 | Angers | 111 | (24) |
| 2022–2023 | Kasımpaşa | 27 | (4) |
| 2023–2025 | Kayserispor | 44 | (8) |
| 2026– | Kyzylzhar | 22 | (6) |

International career^{‡}
| 2013 | France U20 | 4 | (1) |
| 2018– | Cameroon | 22 | (4) |
Medal record
Men's football
Representing Cameroon
Africa Cup of Nations
| Third place | 2021 Cameroon |
- * Club domestic league appearances and goals as of 1 November 2026 ‡ National team caps and goals as of 21:24, 5 February 2022 (UTC)

Stéphane Cédric Bahoken (born 28 May 1992) is a professional footballer who plays as a forward for Kazakhstan Premier League club Kyzylzhar. Born in France, he represents Cameroon at international level.

== Club career ==
=== Nice ===
Born in Grasse, Bahoken began his professional career at OGC Nice, having spent seven years at the club's academy since the age of twelve. In the final game of the season, he made his debut, coming on as a substitute in the 79th minute for Julien Sablé, in a 2–1 loss against Valenciennes. Coincidentally, his debut was before his birthday. Having made five appearances in the 2011–12 season, he signed his first professional contract on a three-year deal.

In the 2012–13 season, Bahoken started to receive first-team appearances, mostly coming on as a substitute. His season, however, was mostly overshadowed because of his fractured fibula, which sustained in training and was out for several months. While playing for the reserves, he was suspended for three games after an incident off the pitch.

On the last day of the transfer window, Bahoken was linked with a loan move to Le Havre, but the move broke down soon after. Following the failed move, he scored the first two goals in a 2–0 win over Montpellier on 10 March 2013.

=== St Mirren (loan) ===
Bahoken joined Scottish Premiership side St Mirren on loan on 30 August 2013. He revealed he was recommended by former teammates and St Mirren himself, Esmaël Gonçalves. After playing four times for St Mirren, he returned to his parent club when the loan was cancelled on 31 December 2013. While at St Mirren, he was known to have a bad attitude, describing himself as "a spoilt kid".

Upon his return from loan, Bahoken was to be loaned back out to CA Bastia, but due to regulatory restrictions imposed by the LFP it was confirmed he could not play for three clubs in one season. Following this decision, he returned to St Mirren to complete his season long loan. He said he rejoined St Mirren following talks with manager Claude Puel, as well as his family. Following his second spell, manager Danny Lennon urged fans to stand by him, due to Bahoken showing 'great desire' and a "positive attitude". After returning to the club, Bahoken failed to make another appearance before his unsuccessful loan spell ended.

=== Strasbourg ===
On 29 July 2014, Bahoken signed a two-year contract with Championnat National club RC Strasbourg Alsace. He made his league debut for the club on 8 August 2014, in a 3–1 victory over US Colomiers. Bahoken scored the winning goal in the Ligue 1 match against Paris Saint-Germain on 2 December 2017.

=== Angers ===
On 8 June 2018, Bahoken joined Angers SCO. He signed a contract with the club lasting until 2022.

=== Kasımpaşa ===
On 15 July 2022, Bahoken signed with Kasımpaşa in Turkey.

=== Kayserispor ===
On 16 September 2023, he signed with Kayserispor.

== International career ==
Born in France, Bahoken was eligible to represent the Cameroon national team through his Cameroonian father. Having previously represented the France U20 national team, he made his senior international debut for Cameroon on 25 March 2018, coming on as a second-half substitute in a friendly against the Kuwait. Cameroon won the match 3–1.

On 8 September 2018, Bahoken scored his first international goal in a 2019 Africa Cup of Nations qualifying match against the Comoros. He played the full 90 minutes and scored in a match that ended in a 1–1 draw.

Bahoken represented Cameroon at the 2019 Africa Cup of Nations, scoring in the group-stage match against the Guinea-Bissau to help his side secure a 2–0 victory. He also scored in the round of 16 against the Nigeria, although Cameroon were eliminated after losing 3–2. He scored two goals in the tournament.

He also participated in the 2021 Africa Cup of Nations, which was held in Cameroon in 2022. Bahoken appeared in the group-stage match against the Ethiopia and the round of 16 match against the Comoros. He also scored in the 71st minute of the third-place play-off against the Burkina Faso, equalising at 3–3. Cameroon went on to win 5–3 in the penalty shoot-out, finishing third in the tournament.

== Personal life ==
Bahoken's father, Paul, played for the Cameroon national team at the 1982 FIFA World Cup as a forward. His mother, Pauline Medzina, is the younger sister of the deceased actress Serange Mebina.

On 20 October 2020, Bahoken was handed a four-month suspended prison sentence with a fine of €2,000 for acts of domestic violence against his partner, as well as a three-month suspended sentence with a fine of €6,875 for a traffic violation.

== Career statistics ==
=== Club ===
As of match played 23 October 2022

Appearances and goals by club, season and competition
| Club | Season | League | | | National cup | | League cup | | Other | | Total | |
| Club | Season | Division | Apps | Goals | Apps | Goals | Apps | Goals | Apps | Goals | Apps | Goals |
|---|---|---|---|---|---|---|---|---|---|---|---|---|
| Nice | 2010–11 | Ligue 1 | 1 | 0 | 0 | 0 | 0 | 0 | — | | 1 | 0 |
| Nice | 2011–12 | Ligue 1 | 5 | 0 | 1 | 0 | 0 | 0 | — | | 6 | 0 |
| Nice | 2012–13 | Ligue 1 | 10 | 2 | 0 | 0 | 1 | 0 | — | | 11 | 2 |
| Nice | 2013–14 | Ligue 1 | 0 | 0 | 0 | 0 | 0 | 0 | — | | 0 | 0 |
| Nice | Total | | 16 | 2 | 1 | 0 | 1 | 0 | 0 | 0 | 18 | 2 |
| Nice B | 2012–13 | CFA | 4 | 4 | — | | — | | — | | 4 | 4 |
| Nice B | 2013–14 | CFA | 1 | 1 | — | | — | | — | | 1 | 1 |
| Nice B | Total | | 5 | 5 | 0 | 0 | 0 | 0 | 0 | 0 | 5 | 5 |
| St Mirren (loan) | 2013–14 | Scottish Premiership | 5 | 0 | 0 | 0 | 0 | 0 | — | | 5 | 0 |
| Strasbourg | 2014–15 | Championnat National | 27 | 4 | 2 | 0 | 0 | 0 | — | | 29 | 4 |
| Strasbourg | 2015–16 | Championnat National | 30 | 6 | 0 | 0 | 0 | 0 | — | | 30 | 6 |
| Strasbourg | 2016–17 | Ligue 2 | 30 | 7 | 3 | 0 | 2 | 0 | — | | 35 | 7 |
| Strasbourg | 2017–18 | Ligue 1 | 26 | 7 | 4 | 1 | 2 | 1 | 0 | 0 | 32 | 9 |
| Strasbourg | Total | | 113 | 24 | 9 | 1 | 4 | 1 | 0 | 0 | 126 | 26 |
| Strasbourg B | 2017–18 | Championnat National 3 | 1 | 1 | — | | — | | — | | 1 | 1 |
| Angers | 2018–19 | Ligue 1 | 32 | 11 | 1 | 0 | 0 | 0 | — | | 33 | 11 |
| Angers | 2019–20 | Ligue 1 | 20 | 4 | 3 | 2 | 1 | 1 | — | | 24 | 7 |
| Angers | 2020–21 | Ligue 1 | 30 | 6 | 3 | 1 | — | | — | | 33 | 7 |
| Angers | 2021–22 | Ligue 1 | 29 | 3 | 1 | 0 | — | | — | | 30 | 3 |
| Angers | Total | | 111 | 24 | 8 | 3 | 1 | 1 | 0 | 0 | 120 | 28 |
| Kasımpaşa | 2022–23 | Süper Lig | 11 | 3 | 0 | 0 | — | | — | | 11 | 3 |
| Career total | | | 248 | 58 | 18 | 4 | 6 | 2 | 0 | 0 | 274 | 64 |

=== International ===
As of match played 5 February 2022

Appearances and goals by national team and year
| National team | Year | Apps | Goals |
|---|---|---|---|
| Cameroon | 2018 | 5 | 1 |
| Cameroon | 2019 | 5 | 2 |
| Cameroon | 2020 | 2 | 0 |
| Cameroon | 2021 | 7 | 0 |
| Cameroon | 2022 | 3 | 1 |
| Total | | 22 | 4 |

Scores and results list Cameroon's goal tally first, score column indicates score after each Bahoken goal.

List of international goals scored by Stéphane Bahoken
| No. | Date | Venue | Opponent | Score | Result | Competition |
|---|---|---|---|---|---|---|
| 1 | 8 September 2018 | Stade Said Mohamed Cheikh, Mitsamiouli, Comoros | Comoros | 1–1 | 1–1 | 2019 Africa Cup of Nations qualification |
| 2 | 25 June 2019 | Ismailia Stadium, Ismailia, Egypt | Guinea-Bissau | 2–0 | 2–0 | 2019 Africa Cup of Nations |
| 3 | 6 July 2019 | Alexandria Stadium, Alexandria, Egypt | Nigeria | 1–1 | 2–3 | 2019 Africa Cup of Nations |
| 4 | 5 February 2022 | Ahmadou Ahidjo Stadium, Yaoundé, Cameroon | Burkina Faso | 1–3 | 3–3 | 2021 Africa Cup of Nations |

== Honours ==
Cameroon

- Africa Cup of Nations bronze: 2021
