= Jeff Reine-Adélaïde =

French footballer (born 1998)

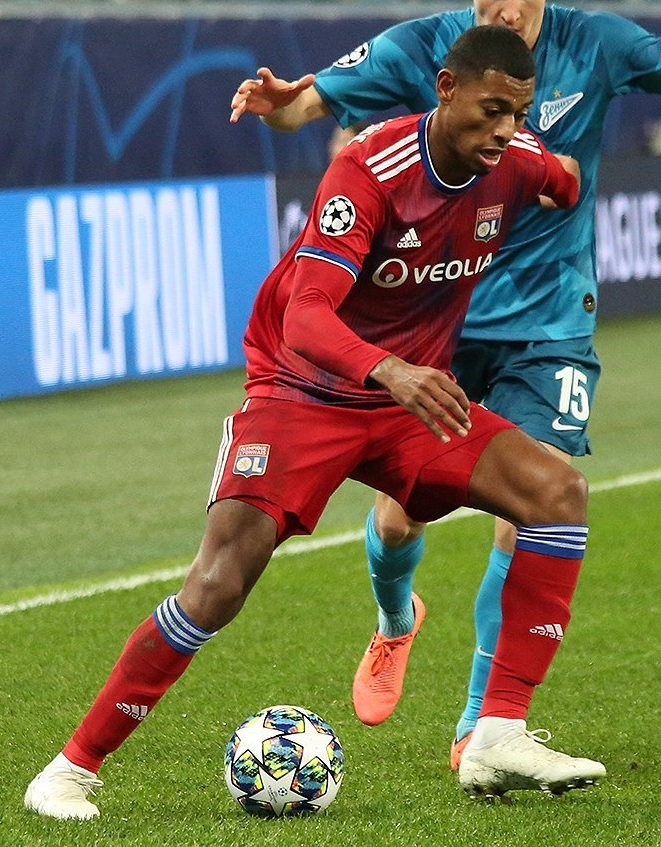
- Reine-Adélaïde playing for Lyon in 2019.

Personal information
- Full name: Jeff Jason Reine-Adélaïde
- Date of birth: 17 January 1998 (age 28)
- Place of birth: Champigny-sur-Marne, France
- Height: 1.83 m (6 ft 0 in)
- Position: Midfielder

Team information
- Current team: Heracles Almelo
- Number: 11

Youth career
- 2004–2006: Champigny 94
- 2006–2010: Torcy
- 2010–2015: Lens
- 2015–2016: Arsenal

Senior career*
Years	Team	Apps	(Gls)
2015	Lens II	7	(0)
2016–2018	Arsenal	0	(0)
2018	→ Angers (loan)	10	(0)
2018–2019	Angers	36	(4)
2019–2023	Lyon	39	(2)
2020–2021	→ Nice (loan)	14	(1)
2022	Lyon II	2	(0)
2023	→ Troyes (loan)	6	(0)
2023–2024	RWD Molenbeek	25	(2)
2024–2025	Salernitana	13	(1)
2025–	Heracles Almelo	6	(0)

International career
2014	France U16	1	(0)
2014–2015	France U17	10	(1)
2015–2016	France U18	8	(1)
2016–2017	France U19	9	(0)
2018	France U20	1	(0)
2018–2020	France U21	21	(7)
Medal record
Representing France
UEFA European Under-17 Championship
Winner	2015 Bulgaria
- * Club domestic league appearances and goals as of 21:55, 16 October 2026 (UTC)

Jeff Jason Reine-Adélaïde (born 17 January 1998) is a French professional footballer who plays as a midfielder for Eerste Divisie club Heracles Almelo.

== Club career ==
=== Arsenal ===
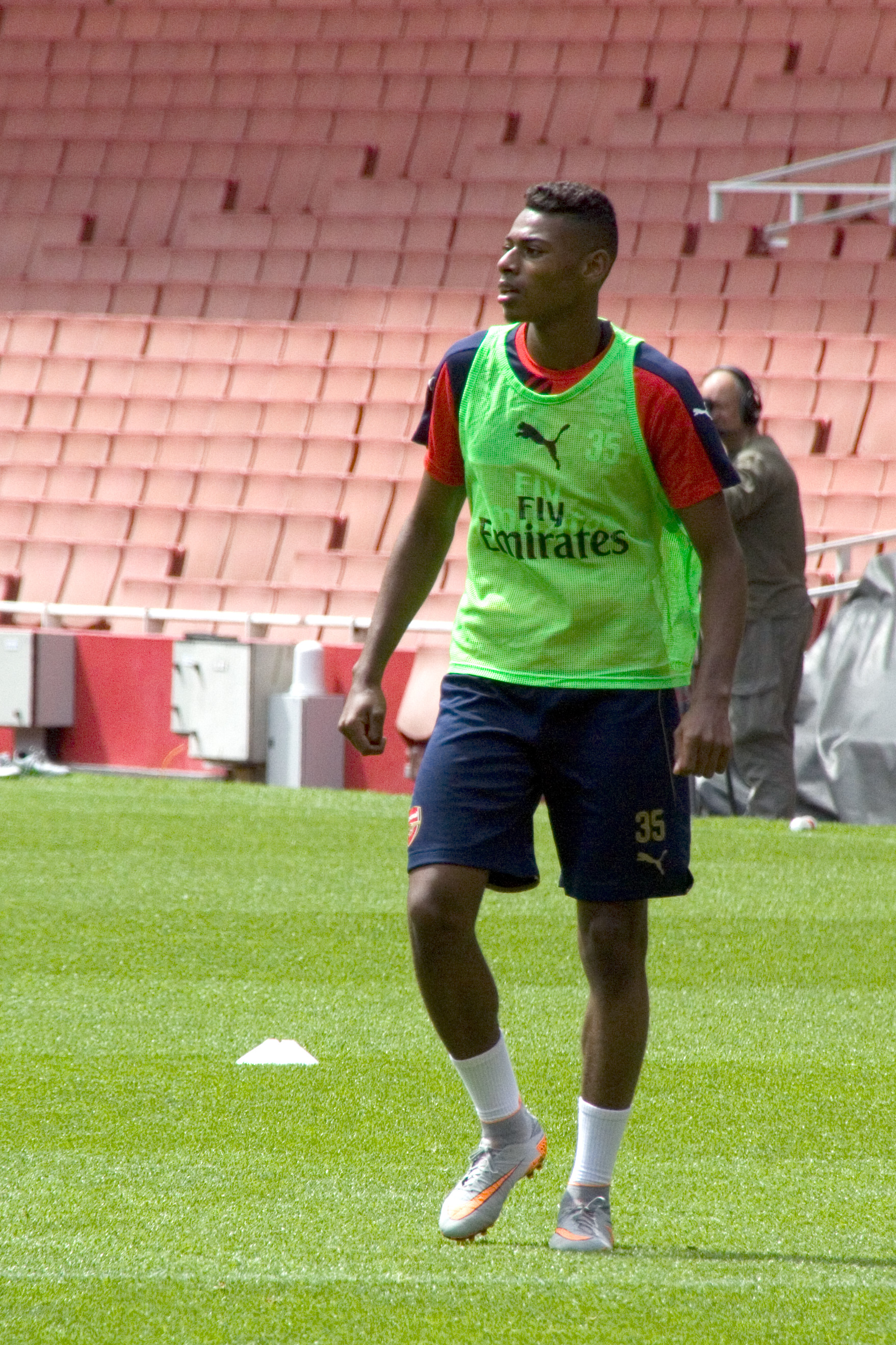
Reine-Adelaide training with Arsenal, 2015

Born in Champigny-sur-Marne, Reine-Adélaïde started his career with Lens, where he played for the club's youth and reserve sides. He made his first-team debut for Racing Club as an unused substitute on 18 April 2015 against Metz. Lens lost the match 3–1. After the season, Reine-Adélaïde signed for Arsenal of the Premier League in England. He made his start for the 2015–16 season in the Emirates Cup against Lyon, in which his performance was praised by supporters and pundits.

He made his professional debut for Arsenal on 9 January 2016 against Sunderland in the FA Cup, coming on as an 81st-minute substitute for Joel Campbell in a 3–1 win at the Emirates Stadium.

Reine-Adélaïde played for Arsenal in their victorious U21 Premier League's play off final of 2016. Also held at the Emirates Stadium, this win thus earned the Gooners promotion to the U21 league's first division.

Adélaïde made six appearances for the club's first team during the 2016–17 season, with the last of those caps coming in Arsenal's FA Cup quarter-final win against Sutton United. After he featured against Reading for Arsenal's U23s, Adélaïde picked up an injury which thus sidelined him for the rest of the season.

=== Angers ===
Adélaïde joined French Ligue 1 side Angers on loan for the rest of the 2017–18 season on 31 January 2018. He made his Angers debut as a sub in a 4–0 loss to Monaco on 10 February 2018. He returned to Arsenal at the end of his loan on 1 July 2018. On 26 July 2018, Angers signed him from Arsenal for an undisclosed fee on a four-year contract. He wore jersey number 22 for the 2018-19 season.

=== Lyon ===
After a strong season debut match, in which Reine-Adélaïde scored a goal and provided an assist, Lyon announced on 14 August 2019 that they had signed the player on a five-year contract from Angers for €25 million, with an additional €2.5 million in bonuses.

On 5 October 2020, Reine-Adélaïde joined Nice in a season-long loan with a €25 million option to buy. However, the club opted not to make the move permanent, with Reine-Adélaïde having been injured for a large part of the season.

On 30 January 2023, Reine-Adélaïde signed for Ligue 1 club Troyes on loan until the end of the season.

=== RWD Molenbeek ===
On 6 September 2023, recently-promoted to Belgian Pro League side RWD Molenbeek announced the signing of Reine-Adélaïde on a one-year contract with an option for a further year.

=== Salernitana ===
On 20 August 2024, Reine-Adélaïde signed for Serie B club Salernitana on a two-year contract.

=== Heracles ===
On 14 July 2025, Reine-Adélaïde signed for Eredivisie club Heracles Almelo on a two-year contract. After only playing in one game for Heracles, Reine-Adélaïde tore his ACL for the fourth time in his career, ruling him out for the rest of the 2025–26 season.

== Career statistics ==
As of match played 9 October 2026

Appearances by club, season and competition
Club	Season	League			National cup (Note: Includes FA Cup, Coupe de France, Belgian Cup)		League cup (Note: Includes EFL Cup)		Europe		Total	
Club	Season	Division	Apps	Goals	Apps	Goals	Apps	Goals	Apps	Goals	Apps	Goals
Lens II	2014–15	CFA	7	0	—		—		—		7	0
Arsenal	2015–16	Premier League	0	0	2	0	0	0	0	0	2	0
Arsenal	2016–17	Premier League	0	0	3	0	3	0	0	0	6	0
Arsenal	Total		0	0	5	0	3	0	0	0	8	0
Angers (loan)	2017–18	Ligue 1	10	0	0	0	0	0	—		10	0
Angers	2018–19	Ligue 1	35	3	1	0	0	0	—		36	3
Angers	2019–20	Ligue 1	1	1	0	0	0	0	—		1	1
Angers	Total		46	4	1	0	0	0	—		47	4
Lyon	2019–20	Ligue 1	14	2	0	0	0	0	8 (Note: Appearances in UEFA Champions League)	0	22	2
Lyon	2020–21	Ligue 1	1	0	0	0	—		—		1	0
Lyon	2021–22	Ligue 1	10	0	0	0	—		1 (Note: Appearance(s) in UEFA Europa League)	0	11	0
Lyon	2022–23	Ligue 1	14	0	0	0	—		—		14	0
Lyon	Total		39	2	0	0	0	0	9	0	48	2
Lyon II	2021–22	Championnat National 2	2	0	—		—		—		2	0
Nice (loan)	2020–21	Ligue 1	14	1	0	0	—		4	0	18	1
Troyes (loan)	2022–23	Ligue 1	6	0	0	0	—		—		6	0
RWDM	2023–24	Belgian Pro League	25	2	2	1	—		—		27	3
Salernitana	2024–25	Serie B	13	1	0	0	—		—		13	1
Heracles Almelo	2025–26	Eredivisie	1	0	0	0	—		—		1	0
Heracles Almelo	2026–27	Eerste Divisie	5	0	0	0	—		—		5	0
Heracles Almelo	Total		6	0	0	0	—		—		6	0
Career total			158	10	8	1	3	0	13	0	182	11

== Honours ==
Arsenal

- FA Cup: 2016–17

Arsenal Youth

- U21 Premier League play-off final: 2016

France U17

- UEFA European Under-17 Championship: 2015

Individual

- UNFP Ligue 1 Player of the Month: November 2019
- UEFA European Under-17 Championship Team of the Tournament: 2015
