= Cheikh N'Doye =

Senegalese footballer (born 1986)

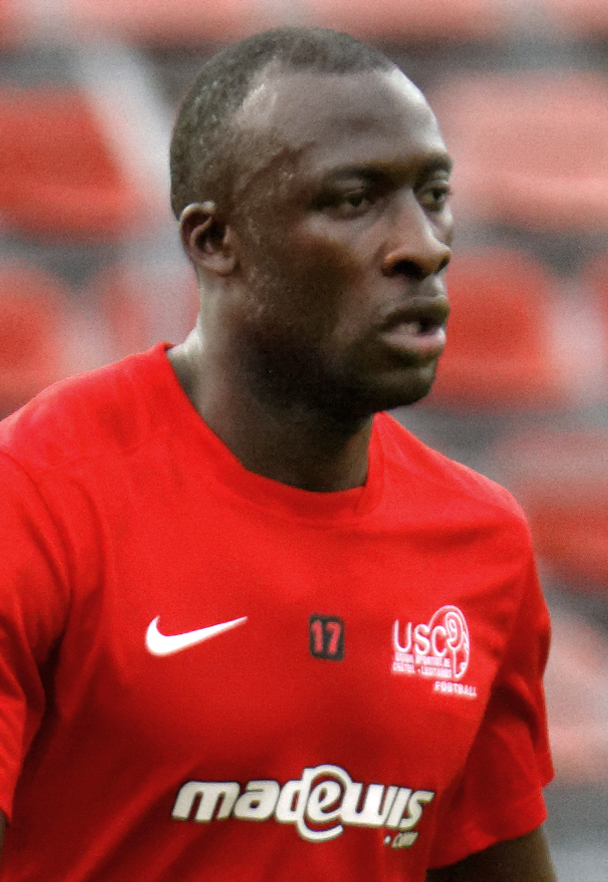
- N'Doye with Créteil in 2014

Personal information
- Full name: Cheikh Tidiane N'Doye
- Date of birth: 29 March 1986 (age 40)
- Place of birth: Rufisque, Senegal
- Height: 1.92 m (6 ft 4 in)
- Position: Midfielder

Team information
- Current team: Cannes
- Number: 15

Senior career*
Years	Team	Apps	(Gls)
2007–2009	Yakaar		
2009–2012	Épinal	72	(17)
2012–2015	Créteil	107	(32)
2015–2017	Angers	65	(14)
2017–2019	Birmingham City	39	(0)
2018–2019	→ Angers (loan)	27	(0)
2020–2024	Red Star	119	(31)
2024–	Cannes	4	(1)

International career^{‡}
2014–2019	Senegal	30	(2)
- * Club domestic league appearances and goals as of 30 November 2024 ‡ National team caps and goals as of 10:04, 6 July 2021 (UTC)

Cheikh Tidiane N'Doye (born 29 March 1986) is a Senegalese professional footballer who plays as a midfielder for French Ligue 3 club Cannes. He made 30 appearances scoring twice for the Senegal national team between 2014 and 2019.

== Club career ==
Born in Rufisque, N'Doye began his career with Yakaar before moving to France to play for Épinal. Following his time there, he had stints at Créteil and Angers.

He was captain of Angers in the 2016–17 season leading them to the Coupe de France final which they lost 1–0 to Paris Saint-Germain.

On 14 July 2017, N'Doye signed a two-year contract with English club Birmingham City, moving on a free transfer. He went straight into the starting eleven for the opening fixture of the 2017–18 season, which Birmingham lost 1–0 away to Ipswich Town, and made 37 league appearances as his team narrowly avoided relegation from the Championship. N'Doye appeared in Birmingham's first two matches of 2018–19, but with the club under pressure to reduce expenditure to comply with Financial Fair Play regulations, he was allowed to return to his former club, Angers, on loan for the season. He was released by Birmingham when his contract expired in June 2019.

On 6 October 2020, after over a year without a club, N'Doye returned to France, signing a one-year deal with Championnat National side Red Star.

N'Doye joined Cannes of Championnat National 2 in October 2024.

== International career ==
N'Doye made his international debut for Senegal in 2014. He was a member of Senegal's 23-man squad for the 2018 World Cup in Russia. In April 2019 he suffered a ruptured anterior cruciate ligament so missed the 2019 Africa Cup of Nations.

== Personal life ==
N'Doye holds both Senegalese and French nationalities.

== Career statistics ==
=== Club ===
As of end of 2023–24 season

Appearances and goals by club, season and competition
Club	Season	League			National cup (Note: Includes Coupe de France, FA Cup)		League cup (Note: Includes Coupe de la Ligue, EFL Cup)		Other		Total	
Club	Season	Division	Apps	Goals	Apps	Goals	Apps	Goals	Apps	Goals	Apps	Goals
Épinal	2009–10	CFA	7	0			—		—		7	0
Épinal	2010–11	CFA	30	11			—		—		30	11
Épinal	2011–12	National	35	4	1	0	—		—		36	4
Épinal	Total		72	15	1	0	—		—		73	15
Créteil	2012–13	National	34	11	2	0	—		—		36	11
Créteil	2013–14	Ligue 2	36	10	2	0	3	0	—		41	10
Créteil	2014–15	Ligue 2	37	11	1	0	4	0	—		42	11
Créteil	Total		107	32	5	0	7	0	—		119	32
Angers	2015–16	Ligue 1	32	9	2	1	0	0	—		34	10
Angers	2016–17	Ligue 1	33	5	4	1	0	0	—		37	6
Angers	Total		65	14	6	2	0	0	—		71	16
Birmingham City	2017–18	Championship	37	0	3	0	0	0	—		40	0
Birmingham City	2018–19	Championship	2	0	0	0	0	0	—		2	0
Birmingham City	Total		39	0	3	0	0	0	0	0	42	0
Angers (loan)	2018–19	Ligue 1	27	0	1	0	1	0	—		29	0
Red Star	2020–21	National	26	6	4	0	—		—		30	6
Red Star	2021–22	National	30	11	4	0	—		—		34	11
Red Star	2022–23	National	31	8	1	0	—		—		32	8
Red Star	2023–24	National	32	6	1	0	—		—		33	6
Red Star	Total		119	31	10	0	0	0	0	0	129	31
Career total			429	92	26	2	8	0	0	0	463	94

=== International ===
Appearances and goals by national team and year
National team	Year	Apps	Goals
Senegal	2014	1	1
Senegal	2015	5	0
Senegal	2016	5 (Note: On 6 September 2017, the Emergency Bureau for the FIFA World Cup Qualifiers annulled the result of the match between Senegal and South Africa from 12 November 2016 and ordered that it be replayed. Originally South Africa had defeated Senegal 2–1. Match referee Joseph Lamptey was banned for life by the FIFA Disciplinary Committee on 20 March 2017 for "unlawfully influencing" the match after issuing a penalty for handball against Senegal.)	0
Senegal	2017	8	1
Senegal	2018	10	0
Senegal	2019	1	0
Total		30	2

Scores and results list Senegal's goal tally first, score column indicates score after each Ndoye's goal.

List of international goals scored by Cheikh N'Doye
No.	Date	Venue	Opponent	Score	Result	Competition
1	31 May 2014	Estadio Pedro Bidegain, Buenos Aires, Argentina	Colombia	2–2	2–2	Friendly
	12 November 2016	Peter Mokaba Stadium, Polokwane, South Africa	South Africa	1–2	1–2	2018 FIFA World Cup qualification
2	7 October 2017	Estádio Nacional de Cabo Verde, Praia, Cape Verde	Cape Verde	2–0	2–0	2018 FIFA World Cup qualification

== Honours ==
Créteil

- Championnat National: 2012–13

Angers

- Coupe de France runners-up: 2016–17

Red Star

- Championnat National: 2023–24
