= John Charles Njie =

Gambian actor

John Charles Njie جون تشارلز نجي
- Occupation: Actor
- Years active: 2011–present

John Charles Njie (Arabic: جون تشارلز نجي), is a Gambian actor.

== Career ==
In 2011, he made debut cinema acting with the film The Mirror Boy. The film was released through Netflix. In 2013, he was nominated to the Best Actor for the Nollywood and Africa People's Choice Awards at Africa Movie Academy Awards for the film Hand of fate.

== Filmography ==
Year	Film	Role	Genre	Ref.
2011	The Mirror Boy	Samba	feature film	
2013	Hand of fate	Momodou Turay	feature film	
2014	Sarata	Mr. Camara	feature film	
