= Albert Abdoulaye N'Diaye =

Commissioner of the province of Éclaireurs de France

Albert Abdoulaye N'Diaye, born in French West Africa, served as the commissioner of the province of Éclaireurs de France of Togo and of French West Africa, became a senior official of the Confédération Sénégalaise du Scoutisme and served as the Vice-Chairman of the Africa Scout Committee in 1959.

He was a student of the Ecole Normale William Ponty.

In 1971, he was awarded the 70th Bronze Wolf, the only distinction of the World Organization of the Scout Movement, awarded by the World Scout Committee for exceptional services to world Scouting.
