= Aïcha Henriette Ndiaye =

Senegalese footballer

Aïcha Henriette Ndiaye is a Senegalese football manager and former footballer.

== Early life ==
She is a native of Ziguinchor, Senegal. She played volleyball as a child.

== Career ==
She captained the Senegal women's national football team.

== Style of play ==
She was known for her versatility.

== Personal life ==
She has brothers.
