= Sally Njie =

Gambian librarian (1932–2020)

Sally P. C. Njie or N'Jie (30 August 1932 – 25 August 2020) was a Gambian librarian. She was the first Chief Librarian at the National Library of The Gambia.

== Life ==
Sally Njie was born in Bathurst, British Gambia. She took O Levels by correspondence course in 1959, and was sent by the British Council in 1960 to study librarianship in the United Kingdom. Qualifying as an Associate of the Library Association in 1963, she returned to The Gambia to take charge of the National Library of The Gambia. In 1974, as Senior Librarian at the National Library, Njie was the only professional librarian in Gambia's public library system. After retiring from the National Library, she worked at and developed the library at The Gambia Central Bank for over 10 years. She finally retired from public service in 2002 and devoted the last 18 years of her life to the Methodist church in The Gambia. She died peacefully at her home in Fajara after a 2 year illness and is buried in Banjul cemetery close to her relatives.

== Writings ==
- 'The Role of Public Libraries in Developing Countries with Particular Reference to the Gambia'. Presented at the International Federation of Library Associations conference, 1983
- 'Collecting Policies and Preservation: The Gambia', in Merrily A. Smith, ed., Preservation of Library Materials, 1987, Vol. 1
