= Mouhamed N'Diaye =

Senegalese footballer

Personal information
- Date of birth: 15 May 2001 (age 25)
- Position: Defender

Team information
- Current team: Oslo Football Academy

Senior career*
Years	Team	Apps	(Gls)
2021–	Oslo Football Academy		

International career^{‡}
2021–	Senegal	3	(0)
- * Club domestic league appearances and goals as of 4 October 2021 ‡ National team caps and goals as of 4 October 2021

Mouhamed N'Diaye (born 21 March 1996) is a Senegalese football defender who plays for the Oslo Football Academy.
