= Mateo Pavlović =

Croatian footballer (born 1990)

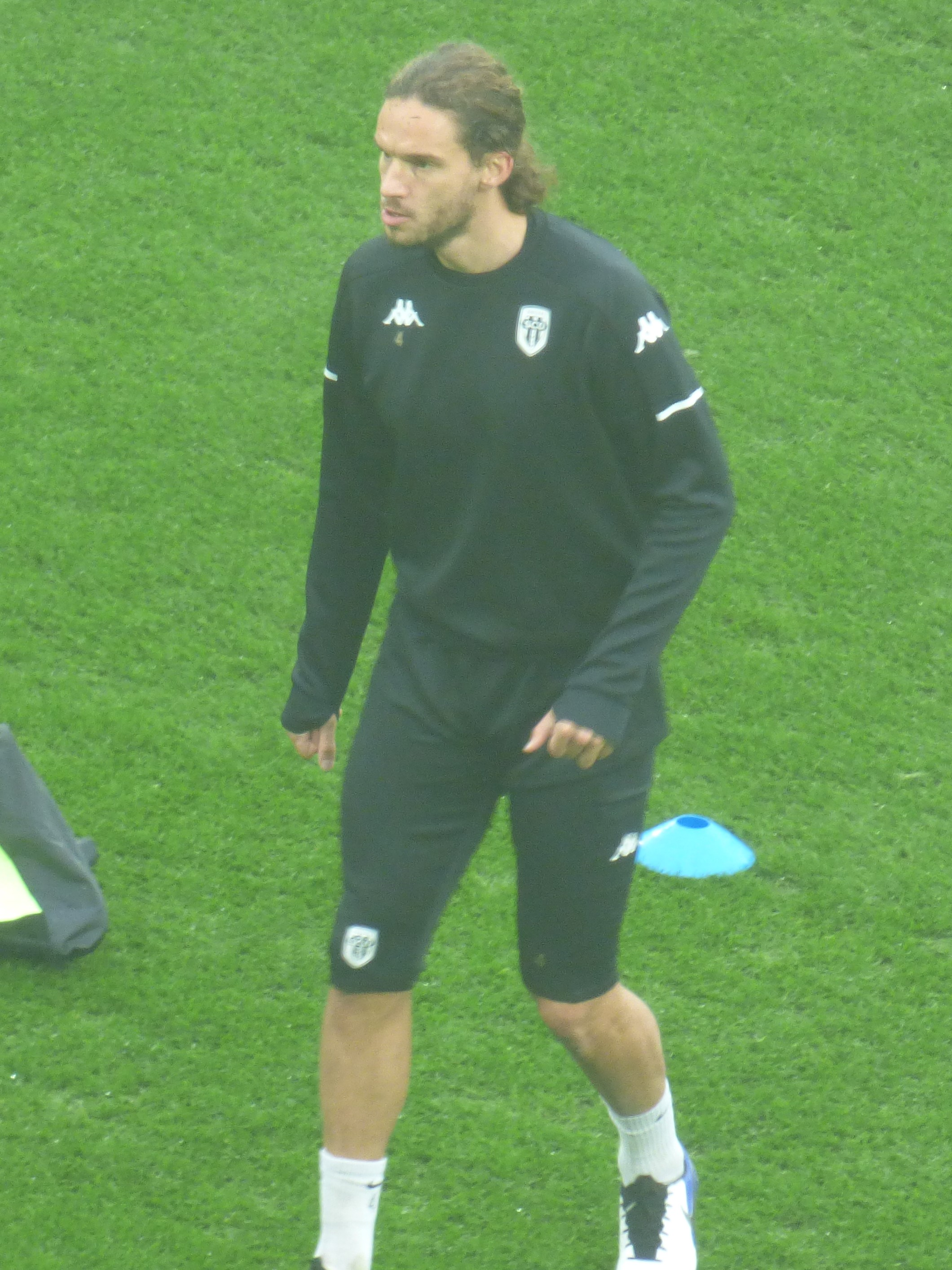
- Pavlović in 2020

Personal information
- Date of birth: 9 June 1990 (age 36)
- Place of birth: Mostar, SR Bosnia and Herzegovina, SFR Yugoslavia
- Height: 1.96 m (6 ft 5 in)
- Position: Defender

Youth career
- 2000–2006: Dinamo Zagreb
- 2006–2008: NK Zagreb

Senior career*
Years	Team	Apps	(Gls)
2008–2013	NK Zagreb	91	(5)
2013–2016	Werder Bremen	4	(0)
2013–2015	Werder Bremen II	12	(1)
2014–2015	→ Ferencváros (loan)	27	(2)
2016–2017	Angers B	2	(0)
2016–2021	Angers	91	(5)
2021–2022	Amiens	25	(2)
2022–2024	Rijeka	13	(0)
2023	→ Saint-Étienne (loan)	0	(0)
2023	→ Saint-Étienne B (loan)	1	(0)
2023–2024	→ Rudeš (loan)	19	(0)

International career^{‡}
2007–2008	Bosnia and Herzegovina U17	3	(0)
2008	Croatia U19	7	(2)
2010	Croatia U20	1	(0)
2010–2013	Croatia U21	10	(1)
- * Club domestic league appearances and goals as of 26 May 2024 ‡ National team caps and goals as of 5 February 2013

Mateo Pavlović (Croatian pronunciation: [matěo pǎːʋloʋitɕ]; born 9 June 1990) is a Croatian professional footballer who plays as a defender. He last played for Croatian Football League club Rudeš, on loan from Rijeka.

== Club career ==
=== NK Zagreb ===
Pavlović came through the youth system at NK Zagreb. He made his senior team debut in a 4–0 league defeat to Hajduk Split on 9 November 2008. He was a regular first team player in NK Zagreb's Prva HNL campaigns for the 2008–09, 2009–10 and 2010–11 seasons, and has also participated in the Croatian Cup.

The central defender was a reported transfer target for a number of major European teams. In April 2011, Croatian sports magazine Sportske novosti said that scouts from Bayern Munich, Werder Bremen, VfB Stuttgart and Zenit St Petersburg had watched him in recent matches. In May 2011, Croatian newspaper 24sata alleged that former French international Christian Karembeu, now a scout, had filmed the player with a view to recommending him to clubs in Ligue 1.

=== Werder Bremen ===
On 17 December 2012, Pavlović transferred to Werder Bremen signing a contract until 30 June 2016.

On 5 February 2014, after making just four first team appearances in over a year, Pavlovic joined Hungarian side Ferencvárosi TC on loan until the end of the 2013–14 season. The loan was extended by another year in July 2014. Having made 33 appearances for Ferencváros over 1.5 seasons, he returned to Werder Bremen.

In January 2016, Werder Bremen announced that Pavlović would be used neither in the first team nor in the reserves. In February, the club was still looking to offload the player whose contract was due to end in summer 2016.

=== Angers ===
In June 2016, Pavlović signed a two-year contract with Ligue 1 side Angers SCO.

=== Amiens ===
On 1 September 2021, he joined Amiens in Ligue 2 on a two-year contract.

=== Rijeka ===
On 22 June 2022, he joined Prva HNL side Rijeka.

== International career ==
Pavlović has represented Bosnia-Herzegovina at under-17 level, and Croatia at under-19, under-20 and under-21 levels. He made his competitive debut for the Croatia under-21s in a 1–0 loss to the Georgia under-21s in a June 2011 qualifying match for the 2013 UEFA European Under-21 Football Championship.

== Personal life ==
His father Luka is a football manager who worked for NK Zagreb and is head of Rijeka's football academy.

== Career statistics ==
As of 1 July 2023

Appearances and goals by club, season and competition
Club	Season	League			National cup		League cup		Europe		Total	
Club	Season	Division	Apps	Goals	Apps	Goals	Apps	Goals	Apps	Goals	Apps	Goals
NK Zagreb	2008–09	Prva HNL	8	0	0	0	—		0	0	8	0
NK Zagreb	2009–10	Prva HNL	14	0	1	0	—		0	0	15	0
NK Zagreb	2010–11	Prva HNL	26	1	2	0	—		0	0	28	1
NK Zagreb	2011–12	Prva HNL	25	4	5	0	—		0	0	30	4
NK Zagreb	2012–13	Prva HNL	18	0	2	0	—		0	0	20	0
NK Zagreb	Total		91	5	10	0	—		0	0	101	5
Werder Bremen	2012–13	Bundesliga	4	0	0	0	—		—		4	0
Werder Bremen II	2013–14	Regionalliga	12	1	—		—		—		12	1
Werder Bremen II	2015–16	3. Liga	4	0	—		—		—		4	0
Werder Bremen II	Total		16	1	—		—		—		16	1
Ferencváros (loan)	2013–14	Nemzeti Bajnokság I	9	1	0	0	5	0	0	0	14	1
Ferencváros (loan)	2014–15	Nemzeti Bajnokság I	18	1	3	0	4	0	2	0	27	1
Ferencváros (loan)	Total		27	2	3	0	9	0	2	0	41	2
Angers B	2016–17	CFA 2	2	0	—		—		—		2	0
Angers	2016–17	Ligue 1	12	1	3	0	1	0	—		16	1
Angers	2017–18	Ligue 1	24	2	1	0	3	1	—		28	3
Angers	2018–19	Ligue 1	30	2	1	0	1	0	—		32	2
Angers	2019–20	Ligue 1	11	0	3	0	1	0	—		15	0
Angers	2020–21	Ligue 1	14	0	4	0	—		—		18	0
Angers	Total		91	5	12	0	6	1	—		109	6
Amiens	2021–22	Ligue 2	25	2	3	0	—		—		28	2
Rijeka	2022–23	HNL	13	0	0	0	0	0	2	0	15	0
Saint-Étienne (loan)	2022–23	Ligue 2	0	0	0	0	—		—		0	0
Saint-Étienne B (loan)	2022–23	National 3	1	0	—		—		—		1	0
Career total			270	14	28	0	15	1	4	0	317	15

== Honours ==
Ferencváros

- Hungarian Cup: 2014–15
- Hungarian League Cup: 2014–15
