= Association des Scouts et Guides du Sénégal =

Senegal's Scouting and Guiding organization

- Country: Senegal
- Founded: 1953
- Membership: 19,000
- Affiliation: World Association of Girl Guides and Girl Scouts; Confédération Sénégalaise du Scoutisme
- Website http://www.scouts-senegal.org/sds.php?nav=4

Cub Scout (Louveteaux)	Eclaireurs	Routiers

The Association des Scouts et Guides du Sénégal (SGdS, Scout and Guide Association of Senegal) is one of Senegal's Scouting and Guiding organizations. Its Scout section is member of the World Organization of the Scout Movement via the Confédération Sénégalaise du Scoutisme. The Guide section is a direct and full member of the World Association of Girl Guides and Girl Scouts since 1981.

The coeducational association founded in 1953 serves about 19,000 members; the Guide section has 4,093 members (as of 2003). The word "scouts" refers to boys, and the word "guides" refers to girls.

== Emblems ==
Badge of Guides du Sénégal

Badge of Scouts du Senegal

The emblem of the Association des Scouts et Guides du Sénégal incorporates elements from the badges from Guides and the Scouts: the tree from the coat of arms of Senegal, a Fleur-de-lis on top of a trefoil, a cross and on the banner SGDS.
