= Harrison Manzala =

Congolese footballer (born 1994)

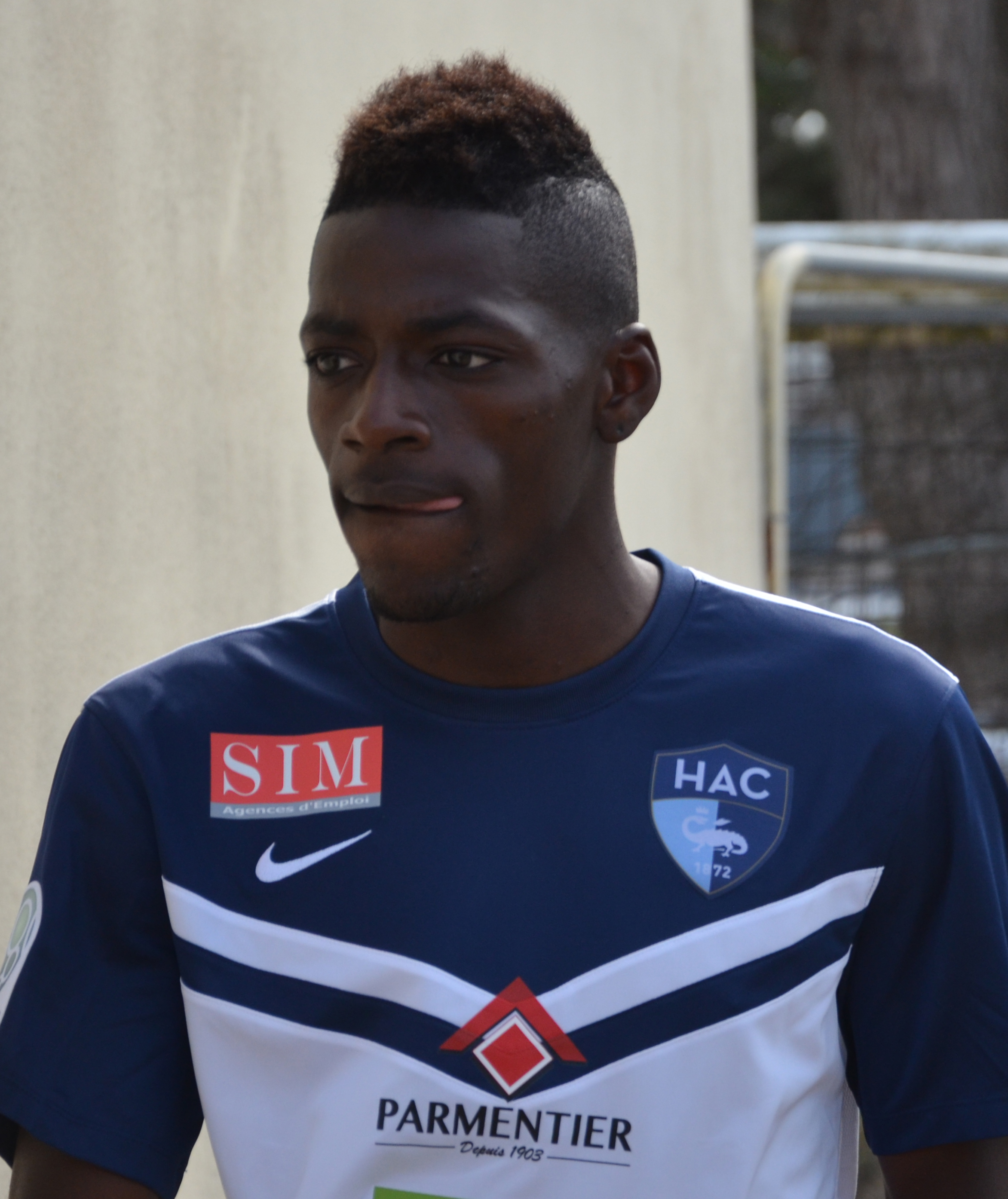
- Manzala with Le Havre in 2015

Personal information
- Full name: Harrison Manzala Tusumgama
- Date of birth: 6 March 1994 (age 32)
- Place of birth: Aubervilliers, France
- Height: 1.77 m (5 ft 10 in)
- Position: Midfielder

Youth career
- –2013: Le Havre

Senior career*
Years	Team	Apps	(Gls)
2012–2016	Le Havre B	51	(7)
2013–2016	Le Havre	49	(5)
2016–2018	Amiens B	2	(1)
2016–2018	Amiens	56	(9)
2018–2020	Angers B	3	(1)
2018–2020	Angers	8	(0)
2019	→ Maccabi Petah Tikva (loan)	9	(0)
2019–2020	→ Le Mans (loan)	12	(1)
2019–2020	→ Le Mans B (loan)	1	(0)
2020–2021	Kayserispor	4	(0)
2022	Bastia	1	(0)
2022–2023	Petrolul Ploiești	3	(0)

International career
2013	DR Congo U20	4	(1)
- * Club domestic league appearances and goals as of 11 November 2022

Harrison Manzala Tusumgama (born 6 March 1994) is a professional footballer who plays as a midfielder. Born in France, he represented DR Congo at youth international level.

== Club career ==
Born in Aubervilliers, Manzala is a youth product of Le Havre. He made his Ligue 2 debut on 3 May 2013 against Istres in a 2–0 home win. A week later, he scored his first goal for the club, against Le Mans in a 4–0 away win, and went on to make 49 league appearances before signing for Amiens in 2016, where he helped his new club gain promotion from Ligue 2 and made 37 appearances in the 2017–18 Ligue 1 season.

Manzala moved on to another Ligue 1 club, Angers, but made only a few substitute appearances before, in February 2019, he joined Maccabi Petah Tikva on loan to the end of the season. He moved to Le Mans, newly promoted to Ligue 2, on loan for the 2019–20 season. On 18 December 2019, he scored Le Mans's sole goal in a 4–1 defeat to Paris Saint-Germain in the Coupe de la Ligue round of 16.

On 13 January 2022, Manzala signed a contract with Ligue 2 club Bastia which ran until the end of the season. On 25 August 2022, he signed a two-year contract with Romanian club Petrolul Ploiești, newly promoted to the Liga I. On 25 January 2023, he parted ways with the club.
