= Abdoulaye Bamba =

Ivorian footballer (born 1990)

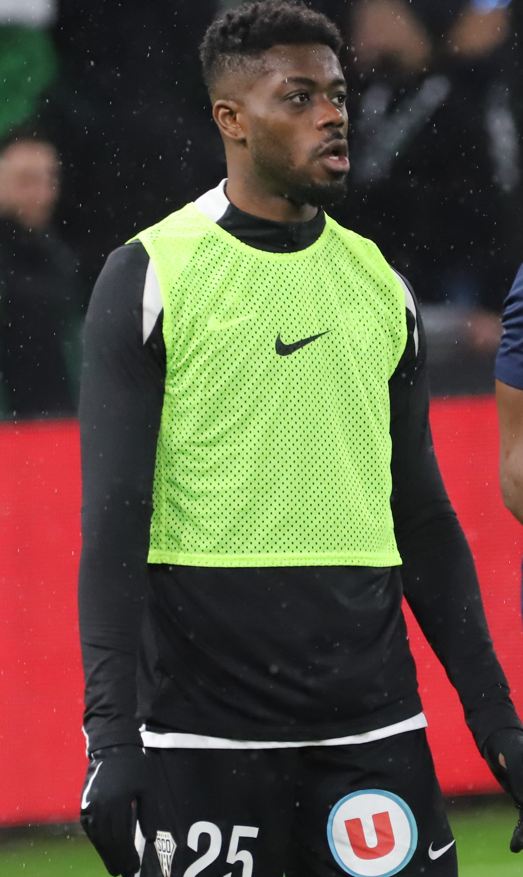
- Bamba with Angers in 2025

Personal information
- Date of birth: 25 April 1990 (age 36)
- Place of birth: Abidjan, Ivory Coast
- Height: 1.82 m (6 ft 0 in)
- Position: Right-back

Youth career
- 2000–2001: Legnago Salus
- 2001–2010: Juventus

Senior career*
Years	Team	Apps	(Gls)
2010–2016	Dijon	150	(2)
2013–2016	Dijon II	16	(0)
2017–2026	Angers	169	(0)
2017–2021	Angers II	16	(1)

International career
2016–2019	Ivory Coast	4	(0)
- * Club domestic league appearances and goals

Abdoulaye Bamba (born 25 April 1990) is an Ivorian former professional footballer who played as a right-back.

== Club career ==
=== Youth ===
Bamba began his career in Italy after moving to the country at a young age. He joined Legnago Salus at the age of ten and, after one season, joined Juventus. While in the club's youth academy, he played on youth teams that won the Supercoppa Primavera in 2007 and the Torneo di Viareggio in 2009.

=== Dijon ===
In July 2010, after spending nearly a decade with Juventus, Bamba signed his first professional contract after agreeing to a two-year deal with French club Dijon. He made his professional debut on 17 September 2010 in a league match against Évian playing the entire match in 5–1 victory. On 26 November, he assisted on the final goal in a 3–0 win over Châteauroux.

=== Angers ===
In January 2017, Bamba joined Angers on a contract until June 2018.

Bamba retired from playing at the end of the 2025–26 season.

== International career ==
Bamba was born and raised in Ivory Coast. He made his debut for the Ivory Coast national football team in a friendly 0–0 tie with Hungary.
