= Confédération Sénégalaise du Scoutisme =

National federation of Scouting in Senegal

- Scouting Federation of Senegal
- Country: Senegal
- Founded: 1930
- Membership: 9,966
- Affiliation: World Organization of the Scout Movement

The Confédération Sénégalaise du Scoutisme, the national federation of several Scouting organizations of Senegal, was founded in 1930, and became a member of the World Organization of the Scout Movement in 1963. The coeducational Confédération Sénégalaise du Scoutisme has 9,966 members as of 2011.

The Senegalese Scout Confederation is composed of two associations, Association des Scouts et Guides du Sénégal and the Éclaireuses et Éclaireurs du Sénégal. Both associations are open to boys and girls of any religion. There are sometimes joint leader training courses. Units are mixed at Cub and Rover level only. The units have joint activities in relation to national campaigns including child health projects.

A satellite office of the Africa Scout Region is located in Dakar.

In 1971, Albert A. N'Diaye was awarded the Bronze Wolf, the only distinction of the World Organization of the Scout Movement, awarded by the World Scout Committee for exceptional services to world Scouting.

== Program ==
=== Activities ===
There are many programs relating to youth exchange and international work camps. Many Scout projects throughout the country are implemented in relation to rural development. Community development projects are centered on health, including nutrition and vaccination of children, tree planting, and building and improving schools.

=== Sections ===
- Jiwu Wi/Cubs- ages 6 to 11
- Lawtan Wi/Scouts- ages 12 to 14
- Toor-Toor Wi/Senior Scouts-ages 15 to 18
- Meneef Mi/Rovers-ages 18 to 35

=== Ideals ===
Scout Motto

The Scout Motto is Toujours tout droit, Always Do Right in French.

Scout Promise

"En présence de tous, par la grâce de Dieu, je me engages à servir, de toute ma volonté, Dieu, l'Église et mon pays, à aider mon prochain dans toute occasion, et à respecter la Loi scoute."

Scout Law

- Le Scout dit toujours la vérité, il tient ses promesses
- Le Scout est loyal envers son pays, ses parents, ses chefs et ses subordonnés
- Le Scout est fait pour servir et sauver son prochain
- Le Scout est hospitalier, il est le frère de tous
- Le Scout est poli et protége les faibles
- Le Scout voit dans la nature l'œuvre de Dieu, il aime les plantes et les animaux
- Le Scout sait obéir et ne fait rien à moitié
- Le Scout est économe et prend soin du bien d'autrui
- Le Scout est maître de soi, il sourit et chante dans ses difficultés
- Le Scout est propre, il est pur dans ses pensées, ses paroles et ses actes
