= 2021–22 Angers SCO season =

Angers SCO
2021–22 season
- President: Saïd Chabane
- Head coach: Gérald Baticle
- Stadium: Stade Raymond Kopa
- Ligue 1: 14th
- Coupe de France: Round of 64
- Top goalscorer: League: Sofiane Boufal (8); All: Sofiane Boufal (8)
Home colours	Away colours	Third colours

The 2021–22 season was the 103rd season in the existence of Angers SCO and the club's seventh consecutive season in the top flight of French football. In addition to the domestic league, Angers also participated in this season's edition of the Coupe de France.

Angers were allowed to stay in the top flight after their appeal against relegation to Ligue 2 along with Bordeaux was accepted.

== Players ==
=== First-team squad ===
As of 28 January 2022

Note: Flags indicate national team as defined under FIFA eligibility rules; some limited exceptions apply. Players may hold more than one non-FIFA nationality.

No.	Pos.	Nation	Player
2	MF	FRA	Batista Mendy
3	DF	CIV	Souleyman Doumbia
5	MF	FRA	Thomas Mangani (3rd captain)
6	DF	CMR	Enzo Ebosse
7	MF	MAR	Sofiane Boufal
8	DF	CIV	Ismaël Traoré (captain)
9	FW	CHA	Casimir Ninga
10	MF	FRA	Angelo Fulgini
11	MF	FRA	Jimmy Cabot
12	MF	FRA	Zinédine Ould Khaled
15	MF	FRA	Pierrick Capelle
16	GK	FRA	Anthony Mandrea
17	FW	FRA	Noah Fatar

No.	Pos.	Nation	Player
18	MF	MAR	Azzedine Ounahi
19	FW	CMR	Stéphane Bahoken
21	FW	FRA	Mohamed-Ali Cho
22	FW	CRO	Marin Jakoliš
23	MF	ALG	Nabil Bentaleb
24	DF	FRA	Romain Thomas
25	DF	CIV	Abdoulaye Bamba
26	MF	FRA	Waniss Taïbi
27	MF	POR	Mathias Pereira Lage
29	DF	FRA	Vincent Manceau
30	GK	MNE	Danijel Petković
35	MF	FRA	Jason Mbock
37	MF	FRA	Kevin Bemanga

=== Out on loan ===
Note: Flags indicate national team as defined under FIFA eligibility rules; some limited exceptions apply. Players may hold more than one non-FIFA nationality.

No.	Pos.	Nation	Player
—	GK	FRA	Paul Bernardoni (at Saint-Étienne)
—	MF	FRA	Antonin Bobichon (at Nancy Lorraine)
—	MF	FRA	Anthony Gomez Mancini (at Burnley)
—	FW	ALG	Farid El Melali (at Pau)

No.	Pos.	Nation	Player
—	FW	SEN	Sada Thioub (at Saint-Étienne)
—	FW	MAR	Rachid Alioui (at Kortrijk)
—	FW	FRA	Loïs Diony (at Red Star Belgrade)

== Pre-season and friendlies ==
Win Draw Loss Fixtures

11 July 2021 Friendly	Angers (France)	2–2	(France) Niort	Saint-Martin-de-Ré, France
18:00 CEST (UTC+2)				Stadium: Complexe Sportif Marcel Gaillard

14 July 2021 Friendly	Angers (France)	Cancelled	(France) US Avranches	France
18:00 CEST (UTC+2)

18 July 2021 Friendly	Châteauroux (France)	0–3	(France) Angers	Saumur, France
17:00 CEST (UTC+2)			Boufal 21'; Alioui 31'; Taïbi 73'	Stadium: Stade des Rives du Thouet

20 July 2021 Friendly	Sporting CP (Portugal)	2–0	(France) Angers	Faro, Portugal
20:00 CEST (UTC+2)	Tabata (yellow card) 59'; Feddal (yellow card) 60'; Inácio 63'; Paulinho 86'		Thomas (yellow card) 50'	Stadium: Estádio Algarve

24 July 2021 Friendly	Angers (France)	3–0	(France) Troyes	Romorantin, France
17:00 CEST (UTC+2)	Bahoken 34'; Cho 42', 45'			Stadium: Stade Jules Ladoumègue

31 July 2021 Friendly	Lorient (France)	1–0	(France) Angers	Lorient, France
15:00 CEST (UTC+2)	Moffi 67'			Stadium: Stade du Moustoir

== Competitions ==
=== Overall record ===
Competition	First match	Last match	Starting round	Final position	Record							
Competition	First match	Last match	Starting round	Final position	Pld	W	D	L	GF	GA	GD	Win %
Ligue 1	8 August 2021	21 May 2022	Matchday 1	14th	38	10	11	17	44	55	−11	26.32
Coupe de France	19 December 2021		Round of 64	Round of 64	1	0	0	1	0	2	−2	0.00
Total					39	10	11	18	44	57	−13	25.64

Source: Soccerway

=== Ligue 1 ===
==== League table ====
Pos	Team	Pld	W	D	L	GF	GA	GD	Pts
12	Reims	38	11	13	14	43	44	−1	46
13	Montpellier	38	12	7	19	49	61	−12	43
14	Angers	38	10	11	17	44	55	−11	41
15	Troyes	38	9	11	18	37	53	−16	38
16	Lorient	38	8	12	18	35	63	−28	36

Source: Ligue 1
Rules for classification: 1) Points; 2) Goal difference; 3) Head-to-head points; 4) Head-to-head goal difference; 5) Head-to-head goals scored; 6) Head-to-head away goals scored; 7) Goals scored; 8) Away goals scored; 9) Fair-play points (Note: Head-to-head record is used only after all the matches between the teams in question have been played).

==== Results summary ====
Overall								Home						Away					
Pld	W	D	L	GF	GA	GD	Pts	W	D	L	GF	GA	GD	W	D	L	GF	GA	GD
38	10	11	17	44	55	−11	41	8	2	9	23	23	0	2	9	8	21	32	−11

Source: Ligue 1

==== Results by round ====
Round	1	2	3	4	5	6	7	8	9	10	11	12	13	14	15	16	17	18	19	20	21	22	23	24	25	26	27	28	29	30	31	32	33	34	35	36	37	38
Ground	A	H	A	H	A	H	H	A	H	A	A	H	A	H	A	H	A	H	A	H	A	H	A	H	A	H	A	H	H	A	H	A	H	A	A	H	A	H
Result	W	W	D	W	D	L	D	D	W	L	D	L	D	W	D	L	W	L	L	L	D	W	L	L	L	L	L	L	W	L	D	D	L	D	L	W	L	W
Position	1	1	2	2	2	4	3	5	4	5	6	8	9	6	6	8	8	9	12	12	12	12	12	13	13	14	14	14	14	14	14	14	14	14	15	14	14	14

Source: Ligue 1
A = Away; H = Home; W = Win; D = Draw; L = Loss

==== Matches ====
The league fixtures were announced on 25 June 2021.

8 August 2021 1	Strasbourg	0–2	Angers	Strasbourg
15:00 CEST (UTC+2)	Djiku (yellow card) 18'; Liénard (yellow card) 40'	Report	Taïbi (yellow card) 35'; Mangani (yellow card) 41'; Traoré 57'; Thomas (yellow card) 79'; Bahoken 81'	Stadium: Stade de la Meinau; Attendance: 23,250; Referee: Jérémy Stinat

15 August 2021 2	Angers	3–0	Lyon	Angers
13:00 CEST (UTC+2)	Boufal 20'; Marcelo 53' (o.g.); Ounahi 77'; Mendy (yellow card) 82'	Report	Lukeba (yellow card) 3'; Marcelo (yellow card) 36'; Cornet (yellow card) 49' (yellow-red card) 65'; Diomande (yellow card) 87'	Stadium: Stade Raymond Kopa; Attendance: 6,154; Referee: Clément Turpin

22 August 2021 3	Bordeaux	1–1	Angers	Bordeaux
15:00 CEST (UTC+2)	Mara 10'; Mangas (yellow card) 61'; Kwateng (yellow card) 74'	Report	Thomas 38'	Stadium: Matmut Atlantique; Attendance: 18,281; Referee: Pierre Gaillouste

29 August 2021 4	Angers	2–0	Rennes	Angers
15:00 CEST (UTC+2)	Boufal 57'; Fulgini (yellow card) 84'; Cho 88'	Report	Badé (yellow card) 31' (yellow-red card) 43'	Stadium: Stade Raymond Kopa; Attendance: 6,473; Referee: Anthony Gautier

12 September 2021 5	Brest	1–1	Angers	Brest
15:00 CEST (UTC+2)	Pierre-Gabriel (yellow card) 27'; Honorat (yellow card) 45+1'; Faivre 62' (pen.)	Report	Doumbia (yellow card) 24'; Mangani 78' (pen.); Cabot (yellow card) 87'	Stadium: Stade Francis-Le Blé; Attendance: 10,982; Referee: Jérémy Stinat

19 September 2021 6	Angers	1–4	Nantes	Angers
15:00 CEST (UTC+2)	Traoré 10'; Fulgini (yellow card) 24'; Mangani (yellow card) 45+4'	Report	Girotto 3'; Blas 6' (pen.), 79'; Kolo Muani 23'; Simon (yellow card) 25'; Chirivella (yellow card) 45+2'	Stadium: Stade Raymond Kopa; Attendance: 9,046; Referee: Amaury Delerue

22 September 2021 7	Angers	0–0	Marseille	Angers
21:00 CEST (UTC+2)	Ounahi (yellow card) 44'	Report	Ćaleta-Car (yellow card) 52'; Balerdi (yellow card) 59'; Harit (yellow card) 65'	Stadium: Stade Raymond Kopa; Attendance: 12,458; Referee: Ruddy Buquet

26 September 2021 8	Troyes	1–1	Angers	Troyes
15:00 CEST (UTC+2)	Chavalerin (yellow card) 8'; Rodrigues (yellow card) 20'; Baldé 22'; Giraudon (yellow card) 63' (yellow-red card) 90+2'	Report	Cho (yellow card) 1'; Mangani 65' (pen.); Boufal (yellow card) 80'	Stadium: Stade de l'Aube; Attendance: 6,868; Referee: Thomas Léonard

3 October 2021 9	Angers	3–2	Metz	Angers
15:00 CEST (UTC+2)	Cho (yellow card) 52', (goal) 53'; Mangani 65'; Bahoken 90+2'	Report	Bronn 10', (yellow card) 90+1'; Maïga (yellow card) 30'; De Préville (yellow card) 39'; Boulaya 58'	Stadium: Stade Raymond Kopa; Attendance: 3,989; Referee: Stéphanie Frappart

15 October 2021 10	Paris Saint-Germain	2–1	Angers	Paris
21:00 CEST (UTC+2)	Pereira 68'; Mbappé 87' (pen.); Verratti (yellow card) 90+3'	Report	Fulgini 35'; Capelle (yellow card) 86'	Stadium: Parc des Princes; Attendance: 47,646; Referee: Bastien Dechepy

22 October 2021 11	Saint-Étienne	2–2	Angers	Saint-Étienne
21:00 CEST (UTC+2)	Khazri 61'; Nadé 90+4'	Report	Traoré 28'; Boufal (yellow card) 45+1'; Fulgini 56'; Mendy (yellow card) 60'; Mangani (yellow card) 90+1'	Stadium: Stade Geoffroy-Guichard; Attendance: 19,836; Referee: Antony Gautier

31 October 2021 12	Angers	1–2	Nice	Angers
13:00 CET (UTC+1)	Boufal 29' (pen.); Fulgini (yellow card) 31'	Report	Kamara (yellow card) 45+1'; Delort 57', 90+1'; Dante (yellow card) 63'	Stadium: Stade Raymond Kopa; Attendance: 6,788; Referee: Willy Delajod

6 November 2021 13	Lille	1–1	Angers	Villeneuve-d'Ascq
17:00 CET (UTC+1)	Bamba (yellow card) 15'; Djaló 27'; André (yellow card) 69'; Onana (red card) 90+6'	Report	Doumbia (yellow card) 27'; Ounahi 83'; Petković (yellow card) 90'	Stadium: Stade Pierre-Mauroy; Attendance: 33,305; Referee: François Letexier

21 November 2021 14	Angers	1–0	Lorient	Angers
15:00 CET (UTC+1)	Thomas (yellow card) 26'; Ounahi (yellow card) 39'; Mangani 68' (pen.); Cabot (yellow card) 72'; Doumbia (yellow card) 81'	Report		Stadium: Stade Raymond Kopa; Attendance: 6,971; Referee: Pierre Gaillouste

26 November 2021 15	Lens	2–2	Angers	Lens
21:00 CET (UTC+1)	Kakuta 48'; Sotoca 55'; Doucouré (yellow card) 57'; Clauss (yellow card) 80'	Report	Boufal 40'; Thomas 70'	Stadium: Stade Bollaert-Delelis; Attendance: 35,713; Referee: Johan Hamel

1 December 2021 16	Angers	1–3	Monaco	Angers
19:00 CET (UTC+1)	Mangani (yellow card) 42'; Nübel 55' (o.g.)	Report	Sidibé (yellow card) 10'; Boadu 25'; Volland (yellow card) 42'; Diop 45'; Disasi 73'	Stadium: Stade Raymond Kopa; Attendance: 8,267; Referee: Romain Lissorgue

5 December 2021 17	Reims	1–2	Angers	Reims
15:00 CET (UTC+1)	Berisha (yellow card) 27' (yellow-red card) 35'; Lopy (yellow card) 30'; Matusiwa (yellow card) 48'; Ekitike 59' (pen.)	Report	Boufal (yellow card) 33', (goal) 49' (pen.); Traoré (yellow card) 39'; Doumbia (yellow card) 57'; Fulgini 75'	Stadium: Stade Auguste Delaune; Attendance: 8,238; Referee: Johan Hamel

12 December 2021 18	Angers	0–1	Clermont	Angers
15:00 CET (UTC+1)	Thomas (yellow card) 90'	Report	Magnin (yellow card) 64'; Bayo 84' (pen.); Diaby (yellow card) 90+5'	Stadium: Stade Raymond Kopa; Attendance: 8,149; Referee: Jeremy Stinat

22 December 2021 19	Montpellier	4–1	Angers	Montpellier
21:00 CET (UTC+1)	Savanier 14'; Cozza 30'; Sambia (yellow card) 48'; Ristić 51'; Mavididi 76'	Report	Boufal (yellow card) 13'; Pereira Lage 45+1'	Stadium: Stade de la Mosson; Attendance: 10,990; Referee: Hugo Miguel

16 January 2022 21	Lorient	0–0	Angers	Lorient
15:00 CET (UTC+1)	Abergel (yellow card) 53'; Jenz (yellow card) 68'; Laporte (yellow card) 69'	Report	Doumbia (red card) 14'; Ninga (yellow card) 56'	Stadium: Stade du Moustoir; Attendance: 4,387; Referee: Johan Hamel

23 January 2022 22	Angers	2–1	Troyes	Angers
15:00 CET (UTC+1)	Mangani 26' (pen.), 37' (pen.); Taïbi (yellow card) 88'	Report	Domingues 10'; Biancone (yellow card) 37'; Salmier (yellow card) 56'; Gallon (yellow card) 89'	Stadium: Stade Raymond Kopa; Attendance: 5,000; Referee: Romain Lissorgue

26 January 2022 20	Angers	0–1	Saint-Étienne	Angers
19:00 CET (UTC+1)	Mbock (yellow card) 89'	Report	Mendy 43' (o.g.); Camara (yellow card) 89'	Stadium: Stade Raymond Kopa; Attendance: 5,000; Referee: Clément Turpin

4 February 2022 23	Marseille	5–2	Angers	Marseille
21:00 CET (UTC+1)	Milik 18', 70', 78'; Gerson 21'; Ünder 84'	Report	Fulgini 8'; Bentaleb 11', (yellow card) 90'; Cabot (yellow card) 53'; Mendy (yellow card) 76'	Stadium: Stade Vélodrome; Attendance: 60,000; Referee: Jérémy Stinat

13 February 2022 24	Angers	0–1	Strasbourg	Angers
15:00 CET (UTC+1)	Cabot (yellow card) 29'; Thomas (yellow card) 68'; Doumbia (yellow card) 83'	Report	Gameiro 11'; Liénard (yellow card) 40'	Stadium: Stade Raymond Kopa; Attendance: 6,521; Referee: Pierre Gaillouste

20 February 2022 25	Nice	1–0	Angers	Nice
13:00 CET (UTC+1)	Kluivert 18'; Boudaoui (yellow card) 72'; Schneiderlin (yellow card) 90+2'	Report	Doumbia (yellow card) 34'; Fulgini (yellow card) 78'	Stadium: Allianz Riviera; Attendance: 18,257; Referee: Romain Lissorgue

27 February 2022 26	Angers	1–2	Lens	Angers
15:00 CET (UTC+1)	Fulgini 49'; Mendy (yellow card) 58'; Cho (yellow card) 60' (yellow-red card) 69'; Boufal (yellow card) 72'	Report	Doucouré (yellow card) 31'; Danso (yellow card) 40'; Mendy 73' (o.g.); Clauss 76'; Frankowski (yellow card) 89'	Stadium: Stade Raymond Kopa; Attendance: 9,499; Referee: Thomas Léonard

6 March 2022 27	Rennes	2–0	Angers	Rennes
15:00 CET (UTC+1)	Bourigeaud 33'; Aguerd (yellow card) 72'; Laborde 87'	Report	Ninga (yellow card) 71'	Stadium: Roazhon Park; Attendance: 27,693; Referee: Benoît Millot

13 March 2022 28	Angers	0–1	Reims	Angers
15:00 CET (UTC+1)	Manceau (yellow card) 49' (yellow-red card) 90'; Mangani (yellow card) 72'; Ebosse (yellow card) 77'; Capelle (yellow card) 87'; Thomas (yellow card) 88'	Report	Munetsi (yellow card) 18'; Flips 24'; Donis (red card) 34'; Foket (yellow card) 58'	Stadium: Stade Raymond Kopa; Attendance: 5,960; Referee: Mikael Lesage

20 March 2022 29	Angers	1–0	Brest	Angers
15:00 CET (UTC+1)	Boufal (yellow card) 9', (goal) 39' (pen.); Thomas (yellow card) 28'	Report	Cardona (yellow card) 43'	Stadium: Stade Raymond Kopa; Attendance: 7,734; Referee: Jérémie Pignard

3 April 2022 30	Lyon	3–2	Angers	Décines-Charpieu
17:05 CEST (UTC+2)	Dembélé 26', 52'; Tetê 80'; Henrique (yellow card) 85'	Report	Pereira Lage 50'; Boufal 59'; Doumbia (yellow card) 90+2'	Stadium: Groupama Stadium; Attendance: 34,376; Referee: Eric Wattellier

10 April 2022 31	Angers	1–1	Lille	Angers
15:00 CEST (UTC+2)	Bentaleb (yellow card) 45+1'; Thomas (yellow card) 54'; Djaló 64' (o.g.); Doumbia (yellow card) 70'	Report	Yılmaz (yellow card) 45+3'; Fonte (yellow card) 65'; Zhegrova 74'	Stadium: Stade Raymond Kopa; Attendance: 9,286; Referee: Thomas Léonard

17 April 2022 32	Nantes	1–1	Angers	Nantes
15:00 CEST (UTC+2)	Lafont (yellow card) 45+5'; Coulibaly 53'; Blas (yellow card) 70'; Girotto (yellow card) 90'; Pallois (yellow card) 90+2'	Report	Boufal 18'; Thomas (yellow card) 50'	Stadium: Stade de la Beaujoire; Attendance: 25,102; Referee: Bastien Dechepy

20 April 2022 33	Angers	0–3	Paris Saint-Germain	Angers
21:00 CEST (UTC+2)	Doumbia (yellow card) 88'	Report	Mbappé 28'; Bernat (yellow card) 42'; Ramos 45+1'; Dina Ebimbe (yellow card) 50'; Marquinhos 77'; Michut (red card) 90+1'	Stadium: Stade Raymond Kopa; Attendance: 12,829; Referee: Johan Hamel

24 April 2022 34	Clermont	2–2	Angers	Clermont-Ferrand
15:00 CEST (UTC+2)	Bayo 71'; Da Cunha 82'	Report	Thomas (yellow card) 34'; Cho 37', (yellow card) 62' (yellow-red card) 75'; Bentaleb (yellow card) 38'; Traoré 44'; Bamba (yellow card) 61'; Mendy (yellow card) 90'	Stadium: Stade Gabriel Montpied; Attendance: 11,531; Referee: Stéphanie Frappart

1 May 2022 35	Monaco	2–0	Angers	Monaco
15:00 CEST (UTC+2)	Volland (yellow card) 37'; Bamba 42' (o.g.); Ben Yedder 61'; Golovin (yellow card) 82'	Report	Doumbia (yellow card) 32'; Mangani (yellow card) 90+2'	Stadium: Stade Louis II; Attendance: 4,616; Referee: Hakim Ben El Hadj

8 May 2022 36	Angers	4–1	Bordeaux	Angers
15:00 CEST (UTC+2)	Cho 5'; Mendy 36'; Bahoken 63'; Fulgini (yellow card) 78'; Pereira Lage 90'	Report	Guilavogui (yellow card) 46'; Ahmedhodžić (yellow card) 56'; Mara 60', (yellow card) 60'; Dilrosun (yellow card) 77'; Adli (yellow card) 89'	Stadium: Stade Raymond Kopa; Attendance: 10,852; Referee: Benoît Millot

14 May 2022 37	Metz	1–0	Angers	Metz
21:00 CEST (UTC+2)	Candé (yellow card) 34'; Lamkel Zé 50'; Traoré (yellow card) 60'; Delaine (yellow card) 68'	Report	Bentaleb (yellow card) 23'	Stadium: Stade Saint-Symphorien; Attendance: 17,213; Referee: Jérémie Pignard

21 May 2022 38	Angers	2–0	Montpellier	Angers
21:00 CEST (UTC+2)	Mangani 45+1' (pen.); Pereira Lage 67'; Fulgini (yellow card) 71'	Report	Makouana (yellow card) 30'; Oyongo (yellow card) 44'; Germain (yellow card) 54'; Ferri (yellow card) 59'	Stadium: Stade Raymond Kopa; Attendance: 11,249; Referee: Romain Lissorgue

=== Coupe de France ===
19 December 2021 Round of 64	ESA Linas-Montlhéry	2–0	Angers	Montlhéry
16:00 CET (UTC+1)	Leno (yellow card) 9', (goal) 10', 24'	Report	Ninga (yellow card) 41'	Stadium: Stade d'Honneur Paul Desgouillons; Referee: Ruddy Buquet

== Statistics ==
=== Goalscorers ===
Position	Players	Ligue 1	Coupe de France	Total
FW	(Morocco) Sofiane Boufal	8	0	8
MF	(France) Thomas Mangani	7	0	7
MF	(France) Angelo Fulgini	5	0	5
FW	(France) Mohamed-Ali Cho	4	0	4
MF	(Portugal) Mathias Pereira Lage	4	0	4
DF	(Ivory Coast) Ismaël Traoré	4	0	4
FW	(Cameroon) Stéphane Bahoken	3	0	3
MF	(France) Azzedine Ounahi	2	0	2
DF	(France) Romain Thomas	2	0	2
MF	(Algeria) Nabil Bentaleb	1	0	1
MF	(France) Batista Mendy	1	0	1
