= 2020–21 Angers SCO season =

Angers SCO
2020–21 season
- President: Saïd Chabane
- Head coach: Stéphane Moulin
- Stadium: Stade Raymond Kopa
- Ligue 1: 13th
- Coupe de France: Quarter-finals
- Top goalscorer: League: Angelo Fulgini (7); All: Angelo Fulgini (10)
- Biggest win: Angers 5–0 Club Franciscain
- Biggest defeat: Paris Saint-Germain 6–1 Angers
| Home colours | Away colours | Third colours |
- All statistics correct as of 23 May 2021.

The 2020–21 season was the 102nd season in the existence of Angers SCO and the club's sixth consecutive season in the top flight of French football. In addition to the domestic league, Angers participated in this season's edition of the Coupe de France. The season covered the period from 1 July 2020 to 30 June 2021.

== Players ==
=== First-team squad ===
As of 1 March 2021.

Note: Flags indicate national team as defined under FIFA eligibility rules; some limited exceptions apply. Players may hold more than one non-FIFA nationality.

| No. | Pos. | Nation | Player |
|---|---|---|---|
| 1 | GK | FRA | Paul Bernardoni |
| 3 | DF | CIV | Souleyman Doumbia |
| 4 | DF | CRO | Mateo Pavlović |
| 5 | MF | FRA | Thomas Mangani (3rd captain) |
| 6 | DF | FRA | Enzo Ebosse |
| 7 | FW | MAR | Rachid Alioui |
| 8 | DF | CIV | Ismaël Traoré (captain) |
| 9 | FW | FRA | Loïs Diony |
| 10 | MF | FRA | Angelo Fulgini |
| 11 | MF | FRA | Jimmy Cabot |
| 12 | MF | FRA | Zinédine Ould Khaled |
| 13 | MF | MAR | Sofiane Boufal |
| 14 | MF | MLI | Lassana Coulibaly |
| 15 | MF | FRA | Pierrick Capelle |
| 16 | GK | FRA | Ludovic Butelle (vice-captain) |

| No. | Pos. | Nation | Player |
|---|---|---|---|
| 18 | MF | FRA | Ibrahim Amadou (on loan from Sevilla) |
| 19 | FW | CMR | Stéphane Bahoken |
| 20 | FW | SEN | Sada Thioub |
| 21 | FW | FRA | Mohamed-Ali Cho |
| 23 | MF | FRA | Antonin Bobichon |
| 24 | DF | FRA | Romain Thomas |
| 25 | DF | CIV | Abdoulaye Bamba |
| 27 | MF | POR | Mathias Pereira Lage |
| 28 | FW | ALG | Farid El Melali |
| 29 | DF | FRA | Vincent Manceau |
| 30 | GK | MNE | Danijel Petković |
| 31 | FW | FRA | Yassin Fortuné (on loan from FC Sion) |
| 32 | FW | CIV | Thomas Touré |

=== Out on loan ===
Note: Flags indicate national team as defined under FIFA eligibility rules; some limited exceptions apply. Players may hold more than one non-FIFA nationality.

| No. | Pos. | Nation | Player |
|---|---|---|---|
| — | GK | FRA | Anthony Mandrea (at SO Cholet) |
| — | DF | FRA | Rayan Aït-Nouri (at Wolverhampton) |
| — | MF | FRA | Kevin Bemanga (at FC Sion) |

| No. | Pos. | Nation | Player |
|---|---|---|---|
| — | MF | FRA | Anthony Gomez Mancini (at Burnley) |
| — | FW | CHA | Casimir Ninga (at Sivasspor) |

== Transfers ==
=== In ===
| No. | Pos | Player | Transferred from | Fee | Date | Source |
|---|---|---|---|---|---|---|
| 1 | GK | (France) Paul Bernardoni | (France) Bordeaux | €8,000,000 | 1 July 2020 | |

=== Out ===
| Pos | Player | Transferred to | Fee | Date | Source |
|---|---|---|---|---|---|
| MF | (France) Baptiste Santamaria | (Germany) SC Freiburg | €10,000,000 | 17 September 2020 | |

== Pre-season and friendlies ==
Win Draw Loss Fixtures

| 22 July 2020 Friendly | Cholet (France) | 0–1 | (France) Angers | Les Sables-d'Olonne, France |
| 17:00 CEST (UTC+2) | | Report | Pereira Lage 90' | Stadium: Stade de la Rudelière |

| 25 July 2020 Friendly | Angers (France) | 1–1 | (France) Bordeaux | Cholet, France |
| 18:00 CEST (UTC+2) | Mouaddib 90' | Report | Koscielny 73' | Stadium: Stade Omnisports Jean Bouin |

| 28 July 2020 Friendly | Le Havre (France) | 3–1 | (France) Angers | Alençon, France |
| 18:00 CEST (UTC+2) | Cornette 5'; Meraş 48'; Bonnet 66' | Report | Kanga 12' | Stadium: Stade Jacques-Fould; Attendance: 300; Referee: Mikael Lesage (France) |

| 1 August 2020 Friendly | Angers (France) | 0–1 | (France) Rennes | Vannes, France |
| 18:00 CEST (UTC+2) | | Report | Da Silva (yellow card) 39'; Traoré (yellow card) 70'; Pavlović 89' (o.g.) | Stadium: Stade de la Rabine; Referee: François Letexier (France) |

| 8 August 2020 Friendly | Lorient (France) | 0–0 | (France) Angers | Lorient, France |
| 18:00 CEST (UTC+2) | | Report | | Stadium: Stade du Moustoir |

| 12 August 2020 Friendly | Angers (France) | 3–2 | (France) Le Mans | Mauges-sur-Loire, France |
| 18:30 CEST (UTC+2) | Kanga 10'; Ninga 13'; Bobichon 40' | Report | Donisa 20' (pen.); Youssouf 45' | Stadium: Centre Equestre de La Pommeraye |

| 15 August 2020 Friendly | Angers (France) | 1–0 | (France) Saint-Étienne | Angers, France |
| 17:00 CEST (UTC+2) | Santamaria 20'; Kanga (yellow card) 56' | Report | Maçon (yellow card) 71' | Stadium: Stade Raymond Kopa; Referee: Jérôme Brisard |

| 4 September 2020 Friendly | Angers (France) | 6–1 | (France) Châteauroux | Saumur, France |
| 15:00 CEST (UTC+2) |

| 9 October 2020 Friendly | Nantes (France) | 1–2 | (France) Angers | Basse-Goulaine, France |
| 11:00 CEST (UTC+2) | Augustin 11' | | Thomas 68'; Fulgini 90+2' | Stadium: Complexe Sportif Henri Michel |

| 13 November 2020 Friendly | Angers (France) | 3–3 | (France) Niort | Angers, France |
| 15:00 CET (UTC+1) | Diony 19'; Alioui 69'; Cho 78' | | Kemen 1'; Baroan 57'; Boutobba 83' | Stadium: Stade Raymond Kopa; Attendance: 0 |

== Competitions ==
=== Overall record ===
| Competition | First match | Last match | Starting round | Final position | Record | | | | | | | |
| Competition | First match | Last match | Starting round | Final position | Pld | W | D | L | GF | GA | GD | Win % |
|---|---|---|---|---|---|---|---|---|---|---|---|---|
| Ligue 1 | 22 August 2020 | 23 May 2021 | Matchday 1 | 13th | 38 | 12 | 8 | 18 | 40 | 58 | −18 | 31.58 |
| Coupe de France | 11 February 2021 | 21 April 2021 | Round of 64 | Quarter-finals | 4 | 3 | 0 | 1 | 8 | 6 | +2 | 75.00 |
| Total | | | | | 42 | 15 | 8 | 19 | 48 | 64 | −16 | 35.71 |

Source: Soccerway

=== Ligue 1 ===
==== League table ====
| Pos | Team | Pld | W | D | L | GF | GA | GD | Pts |
|---|---|---|---|---|---|---|---|---|---|
| 11 | Saint-Étienne | 38 | 12 | 10 | 16 | 42 | 54 | −12 | 46 |
| 12 | Bordeaux | 38 | 13 | 6 | 19 | 42 | 56 | −14 | 45 |
| 13 | Angers | 38 | 12 | 8 | 18 | 40 | 58 | −18 | 44 |
| 14 | Reims | 38 | 9 | 15 | 14 | 42 | 50 | −8 | 42 |
| 15 | Strasbourg | 38 | 11 | 9 | 18 | 49 | 58 | −9 | 42 |

Source: Ligue 1
Rules for classification: 1) Points; 2) Goal difference; 3) Goals scored; 4) Head-to-head goal difference; 5) Fairplay ranking.

==== Results summary ====
| Overall | | | | | | | | Home | | | | | | Away | | | | | |
| Pld | W | D | L | GF | GA | GD | Pts | W | D | L | GF | GA | GD | W | D | L | GF | GA | GD |
|---|---|---|---|---|---|---|---|---|---|---|---|---|---|---|---|---|---|---|---|
| 38 | 12 | 8 | 18 | 40 | 58 | −18 | 44 | 6 | 3 | 10 | 20 | 27 | −7 | 6 | 5 | 8 | 20 | 31 | −11 |

Source: Ligue 1

==== Results by round ====
| Round | 1 | 2 | 3 | 4 | 5 | 6 | 7 | 8 | 9 | 10 | 11 | 12 | 13 | 14 | 15 | 16 | 17 | 18 | 19 | 20 | 21 | 22 | 23 | 24 | 25 | 26 | 27 | 28 | 29 | 30 | 31 | 32 | 33 | 34 | 35 | 36 | 37 | 38 |
|---|---|---|---|---|---|---|---|---|---|---|---|---|---|---|---|---|---|---|---|---|---|---|---|---|---|---|---|---|---|---|---|---|---|---|---|---|---|---|
| Ground | A | H | H | A | H | A | H | A | H | A | H | A | H | A | H | A | H | A | A | H | A | H | A | A | H | A | H | A | H | A | H | A | H | H | A | H | A | H |
| Result | W | L | W | L | W | L | D | W | L | W | L | W | W | D | L | D | W | W | L | L | L | W | D | L | L | D | D | W | L | D | D | L | L | L | L | W | L | L |
| Position | 4 | 13 | 9 | 11 | 8 | 12 | 11 | 8 | 11 | 9 | 11 | 8 | 7 | 7 | 9 | 9 | 9 | 7 | 7 | 7 | 10 | 8 | 8 | 8 | 10 | 10 | 10 | 9 | 10 | 10 | 11 | 11 | 12 | 12 | 13 | 12 | 12 | 13 |

Source: Ligue 1
A = Away; H = Home; W = Win; D = Draw; L = Loss

==== Matches ====
The league fixtures were announced on 9 July 2020.

| 22 August 2020 1 | Dijon | 0–1 | Angers | Dijon |
| 17:00 CEST (UTC+2) | | Report | Traoré 22' | Stadium: Stade Gaston Gérard; Referee: Eric Wattellier |

| 30 August 2020 2 | Angers | 0–2 | Bordeaux | Angers |
| 15:00 CEST (UTC+2) | Santamaria (yellow card) 84' | Report | Maja 25'; Bašić 27', (yellow card) 65'; Oudin (yellow card) 37'; Sabaly (yellow card) 54' | Stadium: Stade Raymond Kopa; Referee: Karim Abed |

| 13 September 2020 3 | Angers | 1–0 | Reims | Angers |
| 15:00 CEST (UTC+2) | Bahoken (yellow card) 19', (penalty missed) 44', 55'; Thomas (yellow card) 52' (yellow-red card) 61'; Fulgini (yellow card) 90+1' | Report | Faes (red card) 42'; Touré (yellow card) 49'; Munetsi (yellow card) 86' | Stadium: Stade Raymond Kopa; Referee: Benoît Bastien |

| 20 September 2020 4 | Montpellier | 4–1 | Angers | Montpellier |
| 15:00 CEST (UTC+2) | Congré (yellow card) 16'; Souquet 18', (yellow card) 41'; Delort (yellow card) 33', (goal) 43', 60'; Cozza (yellow card) 66'; Mollet 86' | Report | Ebosse (yellow card) 11'; Bahoken 25', (yellow card) 56'; Pavlović (yellow card) 62' | Stadium: Stade de la Mosson; Referee: Stéphanie Frappart |

| 27 September 2020 5 | Angers | 3–2 | Brest | Angers |
| 15:00 CEST (UTC+2) | Thioub 22'; Pavlović (yellow card) 39'; Mangani (yellow card) 43'; Traoré 78'; Fulgini 80'; Cho (yellow card) 90+2' | Report | Mounié 3' (pen.); Diallo (yellow card) 27'; Charbonnier 32'; Cardona (yellow card) 85' | Stadium: Stade Raymond Kopa; Referee: Jérémy Stinat |

| 2 October 2020 6 | Paris Saint-Germain | 6–1 | Angers | Paris |
| 21:00 CEST (UTC+2) | Florenzi 7'; Kimpembe (yellow card) 33'; Neymar 36', 48'; Draxler 57'; Gueye 71'; Mbappé 84' | Report | Bahoken (yellow card) 30'; Traoré 52'; Cabot (yellow card) 73' | Stadium: Parc des Princes; Referee: Frank Schneider |

| 18 October 2020 7 | Angers | 1–1 | Metz | Angers |
| 15:00 CEST (UTC+2) | Doumbia (yellow card) 14'; Thomas (yellow card) 36'; Mangani 38' (pen.); Traoré (yellow card) 73'; Fulgini (yellow card) 86' | Report | Udol (yellow card) 37'; Nguette 39'; Pajot (yellow card) 84' | Stadium: Stade Raymond Kopa; Referee: Aurélien Petit |

| 23 October 2020 8 | Rennes | 1–2 | Angers | Rennes |
| 21:00 CET (UTC+1) | Nzonzi (yellow card) 11'; Hunou 17'; Da Silva (yellow card) 44' | Report | Boufal 26'; Fulgini 56' | Stadium: Roazhon Park; Referee: Jérémie Pignard |

| 1 November 2020 9 | Angers | 0–3 | Nice | Angers |
| 15:00 CET (UTC+1) | Bernardoni (yellow card) 22'; Doumbia (yellow card) 35'; Coulibaly (yellow card) 80'; Thomas (yellow card) 87'; Mangani (yellow card) 90+1' | Report | Lopes 12', (yellow card) 40'; Lees-Melou 23' (pen.); Bambu (yellow card) 36'; Boudaoui 77' | Stadium: Stade Raymond Kopa; Attendance: 0 Referee: Jérémy Stinat |

| 8 November 2020 10 | Nîmes | 1–5 | Angers | Nîmes |
| 15:00 CET (UTC+1) | Benrahou (yellow card) 39'; Deaux (yellow card) 55'; Koné 90+1' | Report | Pereira Lage 1', (yellow card) 14'; Mangani (yellow card) 17'; Bahoken 23', 56'; Amadou (yellow card) 54'; Coulibaly (yellow card) 78'; Diony 82' (pen.); Cabot 90+3'; Manceau (yellow card) 90+4' | Stadium: Stade des Costières; Attendance: 0 Referee: Frank Schneider |

| 22 November 2020 11 | Angers | 0–1 | Lyon | Angers |
| 17:00 CET (UTC+1) | Doumbia (yellow card) 47'; Pereira Lage (yellow card) 59' | Report | Cherki (yellow card) 32'; De Sciglio (yellow card) 70'; Kadewere 78'; Mendes (yellow card) 85' | Stadium: Stade Raymond Kopa; Attendance: 0 Referee: Amaury Delerue |

| 29 November 2020 12 | Lens | 1–3 | Angers | Lens |
| 15:00 CET (UTC+1) | Medina (yellow card) 25'; Kalimuendo 34'; Sotoca (yellow card) 83' | Report | Pereira Lage 22'; Bahoken 49'; Manceau (yellow card) 52'; Traoré (yellow card) 65'; Capelle 90+1' | Stadium: Stade Bollaert-Delelis; Attendance: 0 Referee: Aurélien Petit |

| 6 December 2020 13 | Angers | 2–0 | Lorient | Angers |
| 15:00 CET (UTC+1) | Fulgini 10'; Amadou (yellow card) 21'; Boufal (yellow card) 40'; Bahoken (yellow card) 45+1'; Capelle 90+6' | Report | | Stadium: Stade Raymond Kopa; Attendance: 0 Referee: Thomas Léonard |

| 11 December 2020 14 | Saint-Étienne | 0–0 | Angers | Saint-Étienne |
| 21:00 CET (UTC+1) | Debuchy (yellow card) 33'; Moukoudi (yellow card) 39'; Camara (yellow card) 66' | Report | Capelle (yellow card) 85'; Doumbia (yellow card) 88'; El Melali (yellow card) 90+1' | Stadium: Stade Geoffroy-Guichard; Attendance: 0 Referee: Jérôme Miguelgorry |

| 16 December 2020 15 | Angers | 0–2 | Strasbourg | Angers |
| 19:00 CET (UTC+1) | Doumbia (yellow card) 73' | Report | Djiku (yellow card) 12'; Diallo 77'; Ajorque 90+1', (yellow card) 90+5' | Stadium: Stade Raymond Kopa; Attendance: 0 Referee: Bastien Dechepy |

| 20 December 2020 16 | Nantes | 1–1 | Angers | Nantes |
| 15:00 CET (UTC+1) | Abeid (yellow card) 27'; Traoré (yellow card) 45', (goal) 90+3'; Pallois (yellow card) 62' | Report | Thomas 42' | Stadium: Stade de la Beaujoire; Attendance: 0 Referee: Willy Delajod |

| 23 December 2020 17 | Angers | 2–1 | Marseille | Angers |
| 21:00 CET (UTC+1) | Pereira Lage 4'; Diony 23'; Doumbia (yellow card) 46'; Fulgini (yellow card) 48' | Report | Rongier (yellow card) 14', (goal) 75'; Sakai (yellow card) 38'; Ćaleta-Car (yellow card) 55'; Payet (penalty missed) 71'; Khaoui (yellow card) 88' | Stadium: Stade Raymond Kopa; Attendance: 0 Referee: Hakim Ben El Hadj |

| 6 January 2021 18 | Lille | 1–2 | Angers | Villeneuve-d'Ascq |
| 21:00 CET (UTC+1) | Yılmaz 42', (yellow card) 83'; Fonte (yellow card) 66'; André (yellow card) 68' | Report | Thomas 5', 10'; Bamba (yellow card) 90' | Stadium: Stade Pierre-Mauroy; Attendance: 0 Referee: Thomas Léonard |

| 9 January 2021 19 | Monaco | 3–0 | Angers | Monaco |
| 21:00 CET (UTC+1) | Badiashile (yellow card) 18'; Volland (yellow card) 29', (goal) 72'; Maripán 40'; Jovetić 81' | Report | | Stadium: Stade Louis II; Attendance: 0 Referee: Benoît Bastien |

| 16 January 2021 20 | Angers | 0–1 | Paris Saint-Germain | Angers |
| 21:00 CET (UTC+1) | | Report | Kurzawa 70'; Verratti (yellow card) 89'; Neymar (yellow card) 90+3' | Stadium: Stade Raymond Kopa; Attendance: 0 Referee: Amaury Delerue |

| 24 January 2021 21 | Bordeaux | 2–1 | Angers | Bordeaux |
| 13:00 CET (UTC+1) | Hwang 8', 11'; Koscielny (yellow card) 67' | Report | Amadou (yellow card) 32'; Fulgini 39'; Boufal (yellow card) 74' | Stadium: Matmut Atlantique; Attendance: 0 Referee: Florent Batta |

| 31 January 2021 22 | Angers | 3–1 | Nîmes | Angers |
| 15:00 CET (UTC+1) | Capelle 20'; Coulibaly 35', (yellow card) 43'; Diony 55' | Report | Fomba (yellow card) 18'; Alakouch (yellow card) 27'; Cubas (yellow card) 34'; Ripart 41' (pen.) | Stadium: Stade Raymond Kopa; Attendance: 0 Referee: Ruddy Buquet |

| 3 February 2021 23 | Reims | 0–0 | Angers | Reims |
| 19:00 CET (UTC+1) | Cassamá (yellow card) 24'; Faes (yellow card) 75' | Report | Bamba (yellow card) 20' | Stadium: Stade Auguste-Delaune; Attendance: 0 Referee: Aurélien Petit |

| 7 February 2021 24 | Nice | 3–0 | Angers | Nice |
| 15:00 CET (UTC+1) | Doumbia 9' (o.g.); Todibo (yellow card) 15'; Maolida 17'; Gouiri (yellow card) 36', (goal) 83' | Report | Amadou (yellow card) 33' | Stadium: Allianz Riviera; Attendance: 0 Referee: Jérôme Miguelgorry |

| 14 February 2021 25 | Angers | 1–3 | Nantes | Angers |
| 15:00 CET (UTC+1) | Mangani 33' (pen.); Diony (yellow card) 61'; Coulibaly (yellow card) 77' | Report | Simon 4'; Louza 7' (pen.); Lafont (yellow card) 33'; Blas (yellow card) 83'; Bamba 86'; Kolo (yellow card) 90+5' | Stadium: Stade Raymond Kopa; Attendance: 0 Referee: François Letexier |

| 21 February 2021 26 | Strasbourg | 0–0 | Angers | Strasbourg |
| 15:00 CET (UTC+1) | Sissoko (yellow card) 45+2'; Mitrović (yellow card) 58' | Report | Diony (yellow card) 76' | Stadium: Stade de la Meinau; Attendance: 0 Referee: Hakim Ben El Hadj |

| 28 February 2021 27 | Angers | 2–2 | Lens | Angers |
| 15:00 CET (UTC+1) | Diony 5'; Mangani 10' (pen.) | Report | Clauss 22'; Kalimuendo 90+2' | Stadium: Stade Raymond Kopa; Attendance: 0 Referee: Bastien Dechepy |

| 3 March 2021 28 | Metz | 0–1 | Angers | Metz |
| 19:00 CET (UTC+1) | Kouyaté (yellow card) 44'; Ambrose (yellow card) 76'; Oukidja (red card) 90+1' | Report | Fulgini 44' (pen.); Pereira Lage (yellow card) 79'; Doumbia (yellow card) 90+1' | Stadium: Stade Saint-Symphorien; Attendance: 0 Referee: Johan Hamel |

| 13 March 2021 29 | Angers | 0–1 | Saint-Étienne | Angers |
| 13:00 CET (UTC+1) | Fulgini (yellow card) 88' | Report | Khazri 52'; Bouanga (yellow card) 54'; Aouchiche (yellow card) 59' | Stadium: Stade Raymond Kopa; Attendance: 0 Referee: Benoît Millot |

| 21 March 2021 30 | Brest | 0–0 | Angers | Brest |
| 15:00 CET (UTC+1) | Lasne (yellow card) 46' | Report | Doumbia (yellow card) 24'; Amadou (yellow card) 47'; Boufal (yellow card) 84' | Stadium: Stade Francis-Le Blé; Attendance: 0 Referee: Aurélien Petit |

| 4 April 2021 31 | Angers | 1–1 | Montpellier | Angers |
| 13:00 CEST (UTC+2) | Capelle (yellow card) 49'; Bahoken 72' | Report | Sambia (yellow card) 30'; Mavididi 47' | Stadium: Stade Raymond Kopa; Attendance: 0 Referee: Florent Batta |

| 11 April 2021 32 | Lyon | 3–0 | Angers | Décines-Charpieu |
| 21:00 CEST (UTC+2) | Depay 21', 83'; Paquetá 41' | Report | | Stadium: Parc Olympique Lyonnais; Attendance: 0 Referee: Mikael Lesage |

| 17 April 2021 33 | Angers | 0–3 | Rennes | Angers |
| 12:45 CEST (UTC+2) | Amadou (yellow card) 45+2'; Traoré (yellow card) 66' | Report | Doku 45+1'; Terrier 63'; Guirassy 90+1' | Stadium: Stade Raymond Kopa; Attendance: 0 Referee: Thomas Léonard |

| 25 April 2021 34 | Angers | 0–1 | Monaco | Angers |
| 17:05 CEST (UTC+2) | Manceau (yellow card) 45+1'; Ould Khaled (yellow card) 74' | Report | Tchouaméni (yellow card) 57'; Ben Yedder (yellow card) 74', (goal) 79' | Stadium: Stade Raymond Kopa; Attendance: 0 Referee: Hakim Ben El Hadj |

| 2 May 2021 35 | Lorient | 2–0 | Angers | Lorient |
| 15:00 CEST (UTC+2) | Laporte (yellow card) 28' (yellow-red card) 50'; Wissa 44' (pen.); Lemoine 47'; Le Fée (yellow card) 65' | Report | Coulibaly (red card) 15'; Manceau (yellow card) 43'; Pereira Lage (yellow card) 46'; Pavlović (yellow card) 90+2' | Stadium: Stade du Moustoir; Attendance: 0 Referee: Willy Delajod |

| 9 May 2021 36 | Angers | 3–0 | Dijon | Angers |
| 15:00 CEST (UTC+2) | Fulgini 7'; Allagbé 50' (o.g.); Diony 89' | Report | | Stadium: Stade Raymond Kopa; Attendance: 0 Referee: Jérôme Brisard |

| 16 May 2021 37 | Marseille | 3–2 | Angers | Marseille |
| 21:00 CEST (UTC+2) | Milik 9', 48', 90+5' (pen.), (yellow card) 37'; Rongier (yellow card) 22'; Álvaro (yellow card) 88' | Report | Pereira Lage 57', (yellow card) 62'; Thomas 85', (yellow card) 90+3' | Stadium: Stade Vélodrome; Attendance: 0 Referee: Frank Schneider |

| 23 May 2021 38 | Angers | 1–2 | Lille | Angers |
| 21:00 CEST (UTC+2) | Fulgini 90+1' | Report | David 10'; Yılmaz 45+1' (pen.); Sanches (yellow card) 75'; Çelik (yellow card) 78' | Stadium: Stade Raymond Kopa; Attendance: 0 Referee: Benoît Bastien |

=== Coupe de France ===
| 11 February 2021 Round of 64 | Angers | 2–1 | Rennes | Angers |
| 21:00 CET (UTC+1) | Fulgini 4', 14' (pen.); Thomas (yellow card) 26'; Thioub (yellow card) 81' | Report | Maouassa (yellow card) 15'; Guirassy 53'; Gboho (yellow card) 74'; Salin (yellow card) 85' | Stadium: Stade Raymond Kopa; Attendance: 0 Referee: Benoît Bastien |

| 7 March 2021 Round of 32 | Angers | 5–0 | (Martinique) Club Franciscain | Angers |
| 18:30 CET (UTC+1) | Mangani (yellow card) 18'; Fulgini 31'; Pavlović (yellow card) 43'; Amadou 45+1', 60'; Bahoken 52'; Fatar 87' | Report | Abaul (yellow card) 11'; Jougon (yellow card) 21'; Dondon (yellow card) 23'; Lepel (red card) 36'; Thimon (yellow card) 78' | Stadium: Stade Raymond Kopa; Attendance: 0 Referee: Jérôme Miguelgorry |

| 7 April 2021 Round of 16 | CS Sedan Ardennes | 0–1 | Angers | Sedan |
| 16:45 CEST (UTC+2) | Calvet (yellow card) 85' | Report | Manceau 25' | Stadium: Stade Louis Dugauguez; Attendance: 0 Referee: Eric Wattellier |

| 21 April 2021 Quarter-finals | Paris Saint-Germain | 5–0 | Angers | Paris |
| 18:45 CEST (UTC+2) | Icardi 9', 68', 90'; Manceau 23' (o.g.); Paredes (yellow card) 31'; Neymar 65' | Report | Mangani (yellow card) 51' | Stadium: Parc des Princes; Attendance: 0 Referee: Amaury Delerue |

== Statistics ==
=== Goalscorers ===
As of 23 October 2020

| Rank | No. | Pos | Nat | Name | Ligue 1 | Coupe de France | Total |
|---|---|---|---|---|---|---|---|
| 1 | 8 | DF | (Ivory Coast) | Ismaël Traoré | 3 | 0 | 3 |
| 2 | 10 | MF | (France) | Angelo Fulgini | 2 | 0 | 2 |
| 2 | 19 | FW | (Cameroon) | Stéphane Bahoken | 2 | 0 | 2 |
| 3 | 5 | MF | (France) | Thomas Mangani | 1 | 0 | 1 |
| 3 | 13 | MF | (Morocco) | Sofiane Boufal | 1 | 0 | 1 |
| 3 | 20 | MF | (Senegal) | Sada Thioub | 1 | 0 | 1 |
| Totals | | | | | 10 | 0 | 10 |
