= Mohamed-Ali Cho =

French footballer (born 2004)

- Cho with Nice in 2025

Personal information
- Full name: Mohamed-Ali Cho
- Date of birth: 19 January 2004 (age 22)
- Place of birth: Stains, France
- Height: 1.81 m (5 ft 11 in)
- Position: Forward

Team information
- Current team: Hull City
- Number: 50

Youth career
- 2010–2011: Chantilly
- 2011–2015: Paris Saint-Germain
- 2015–2020: Everton

Senior career*
Years	Team	Apps	(Gls)
2020	Angers B	1	(0)
2020–2022	Angers	53	(4)
2022–2024	Real Sociedad	30	(1)
2024–2026	Nice	69	(8)
2026–	Hull City	4	(1)

International career^{‡}
2019	England U16	2	(0)
2022	France U19	3	(2)
2023–2024	France U20	6	(1)
2021–	France U21	8	(0)
- * Club domestic league appearances and goals as of 19:39, 19 September 2026 (UTC) ‡ National team caps and goals as of 23:00, 6 September 2024 (UTC)

Mohamed-Ali Cho (born 19 January 2004) is a French professional footballer who plays as a forward for Premier League club Hull City. Born in France, Cho previously represented England as a youth international before switching his allegiance to France.

== Early life ==
Cho was born in France to an Ivorian father and a French mother of Moroccan origin and moved to England at one week old, where his family worked in London. He spent his childhood moving between England and France several times. Cho briefly returned to France at age 6 to play in Chantilly's and then Paris Saint-Germain's academy, before returning to England at age 11.

== Club career ==
=== Angers ===
A youth product of Paris Saint-Germain (PSG) and Everton, Cho signed his first professional contract with Angers on 2 May 2020. In doing so, he became the second youngest player to sign a professional contract in France (behind Eduardo Camavinga). Angers had initially planned to use him in the reserves, but he quickly became part of the first team. He made his professional debut with Angers in a 2–0 Ligue 1 loss to Bordeaux on 30 August 2020. He was one of the 10 youngest players to play in the top European leagues during the season. He started his first match for Angers on 11 February 2021, in a 2–1 cup win against Rennes. He made his first league start on 17 April 2021 also against Rennes.

=== Real Sociedad ===
On 15 June 2022, it was announced that Cho had signed a five-year deal with La Liga side Real Sociedad. The transfer fee paid to Angers was reportedly in the region of €12 to €15 million. On 21 December, he scored his first goal at the club in a 5–0 away win against Coria in the Copa del Rey second round. On 4 June 2023, he scored his first La Liga goal in a 2–1 victory against Sevilla.

=== Nice ===
On 8 January 2024, Cho returned to France, signing a four-and-a-half-year contract with Ligue 1 club Nice, for a reported transfer fee of €12 million.

=== Hull City ===
On 27 August 2026, Cho joined newly promoted Premier League club Hull City for an undisclosed fee on a five-year contract. On 29 August, Cho made his Premier League debut for Hull as a substitute in a 1-0 victory over Coventry City.

== International career ==
Born in France, raised in England, and of Ivorian and Moroccan descent, Cho is eligible for all four national teams. He was a youth international for England with two caps for the England U16s. He has also played for the England U15s. In early 2021, Cho said that he hadn't decided on who to represent internationally, stating: "I am well aware of the options I have and we will see later". He switched to represent the France U21s in April 2021.

== Style of play ==
Cho is a forward who is capable of playing at left-wing, right-wing, or centre forward. He has been noted for his physical strength and pace, as well as his direct style of dribbling and taking on defenders in one-to-one situations. During his time in Spain and France, he was also noted for his agility.

== Career statistics ==
As of match played 19 September 2026

Appearances and goals by club, season and competition
Club	Season	League			National cup (Note: Includes Coupe de France, Copa del Rey)		League cup (Note: Includes EFL Cup)		Europe		Other		Total	
Club	Season	Division	Apps	Goals	Apps	Goals	Apps	Goals	Apps	Goals	Apps	Goals	Apps	Goals
Angers B	2020–21	National 2	1	0	—		—		—		—		1	0
Angers	2020–21	Ligue 1	21	0	2	0	—		—		—		23	0
Angers	2021–22	Ligue 1	32	4	1	0	—		—		—		33	4
Angers	Total		53	4	3	0	—		—		—		56	4
Real Sociedad	2022–23	La Liga	19	1	1	1	—		4 (Note: Appearances in UEFA Europa League)	0	—		24	2
Real Sociedad	2023–24	La Liga	11	0	1	0	—		4 (Note: Appearances in UEFA Champions League)	0	—		16	0
Real Sociedad	Total		30	1	2	1	—		8	0	—		40	2
Nice	2023–24	Ligue 1	17	1	3	1	—		—		—		20	2
Nice	2024–25	Ligue 1	27	3	2	1	—		6	1	—		35	5
Nice	2025–26	Ligue 1	24	4	4	0	—		7	1	2 (Note: Appearances in Ligue 1 relegation/promotion play-offs)	0	37	5
Nice	2026–27	Ligue 1	1	0	—		—		—		—		1	0
Nice	Total		69	8	9	2	—		13	2	2	0	93	12
Hull City	2026–27	Premier League	4	1	0	0	1	0	—		—		5	1
Career total			157	14	14	3	1	0	21	2	2	0	195	19

== Honours ==
Nice

- Coupe de France runner-up: 2025–26
