= Danijel Petković =

Montenegrin footballer (born 1993)

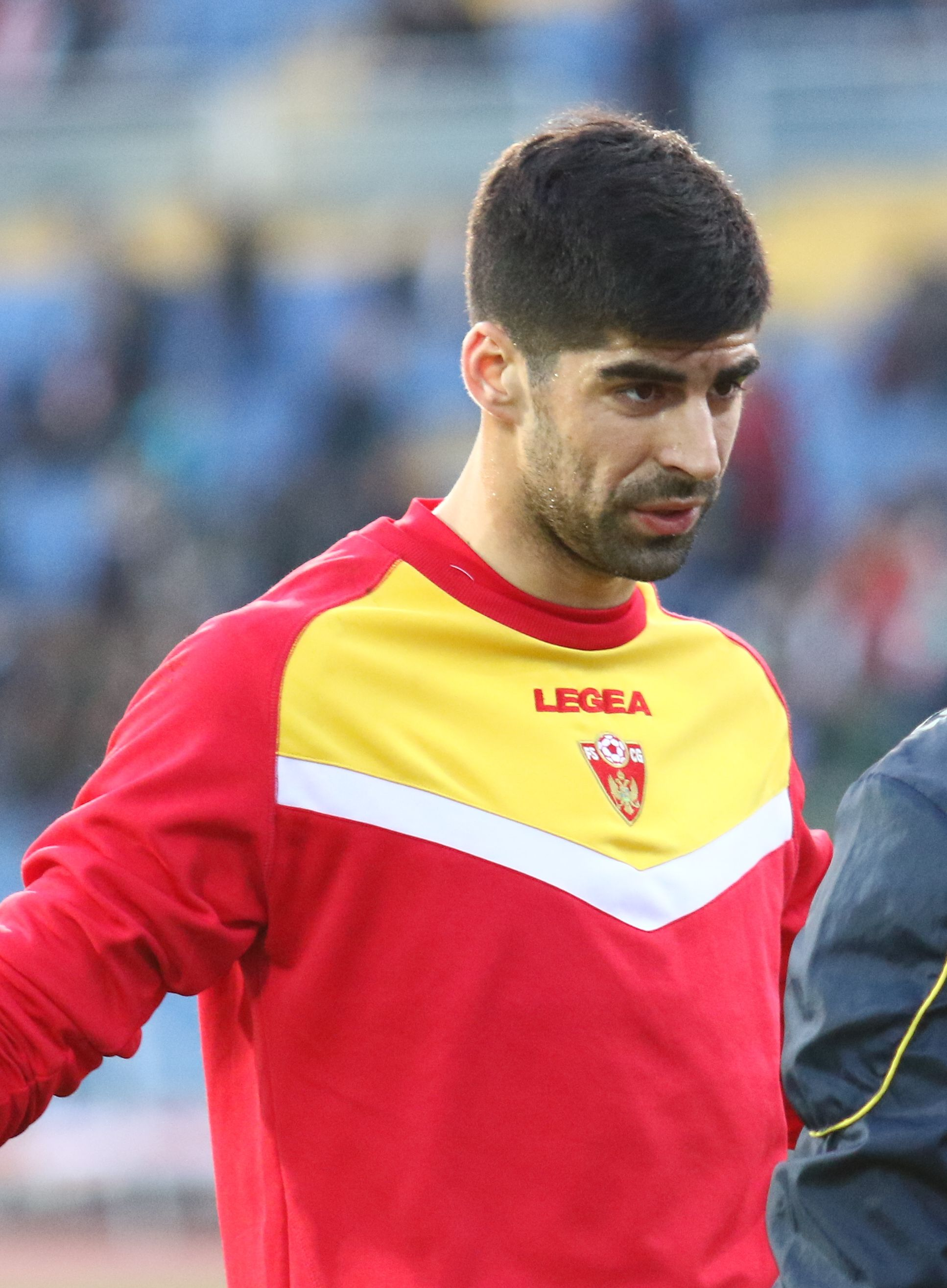
- Petković with Montenegro in 2019

Personal information
- Date of birth: 25 May 1993 (age 33)
- Place of birth: Kotor, Montenegro, FR Yugoslavia
- Height: 1.94 m (6 ft 4 in)
- Position: Goalkeeper

Team information
- Current team: Liepāja
- Number: 12

Youth career
- Bokelj

Senior career*
Years	Team	Apps	(Gls)
2011–2014	Bokelj	26	(0)
2014–2015	Zeta	26	(0)
2015–2016	Lovćen	36	(0)
2016–2017	MTK Budapest	26	(0)
2017–2019	Lorient	47	(0)
2019–2022	Angers	17	(0)
2019	Angers B	1	(0)
2023–2024	Kisvárda	19	(0)
2024–	Liepāja	60	(0)

International career^{‡}
2012–2014	Montenegro U21	13	(0)
2014–	Montenegro	30	(0)
- * Club domestic league appearances and goals as of 14 June 2026 ‡ National team caps and goals as of 15 November 2026

Danijel Petković (Serbian Cyrillic: Данијел Петковић, pronounced [dǎnijel pêtkoʋitɕ]; born on 25 May 1993) is a Montenegrin professional footballer who plays as a goalkeeper for Latvian Higher League club Liepāja and the Montenegro national team.

== Club career ==
Petković started his career at Bokelj. After gaining promotion with them in 2014, he signed with FK Zeta. After one season with Zeta, he joined Lovćen on a two-year contract.

On 29 August 2016, Petković signed a three-year contract with the Hungarian team MTK Budapest. After spending one season in Hungary, he signed a three-year contract with FC Lorient in July 2017.

== International career ==
Until 2014 he featured regularly for Montenegro U21. On 26 May 2014, he made his Montenegro debut in a 0–0 draw against Iran.

== Career statistics ==
=== Club ===
As of match played 6 June 2023

Appearances and goals by club, season and competition
Club	Season	League			Cup		League Cup		Europe		Other		Total	
Club	Season	Division	Apps	Goals	Apps	Goals	Apps	Goals	Apps	Goals	Apps	Goals	Apps	Goals
Zeta	2014–15	Montenegrin First League	26	0	0	0	—		—		—		26	0
Lovćen	2015–16	Montenegrin First League	31	0	3	0	—		—		—		34	0
Lovćen	2016–17	Montenegrin First League	5	0	—		—		—		—		5	0
Lovćen	Total		36	0	3	0	—		—		—		39	0
MTK Budapest	2016–17	NB I	26	0	0	0	—		—		—		26	0
Lorient	2017–18	Ligue 2	37	0	4	0	3	0	—		—		44	0
Lorient	2018–19	Ligue 2	10	0	0	0	2	0	—		—		12	0
Lorient	Total		47	0	4	0	5	0	—		—		56	0
Angers	2019–20	Ligue 1	2	0	3	0	1	0	—		—		6	0
Angers	2020–21	Ligue 1	0	0	0	0	—		—		—		0	0
Angers	2021–22	Ligue 1	15	0	0	0	—		—		—		15	0
Angers	Total		17	0	3	0	1	0	—		—		21	0
Kisvárda	2022–23	NB I	5	0	2	0	—		—		—		7	0
Kisvárda	2023–24	NB I	14	0	3	0	—		—		—		17	0
Kisvárda	Total		19	0	5	0	—		—		—		24	0
Liepāja	2024	Virslīga	13	0	2	0	—		—		—		15	0
Career total			184	0	20	0	6	0	0	0	0	0	210	0

=== International ===
As of match played 20 December 2023

Appearances and goals by national team and year
National team	Year	Apps	Goals
Montenegro	2014	1	0
Montenegro	2015	0	0
Montenegro	2016	0	0
Montenegro	2017	6	0
Montenegro	2018	8	0
Montenegro	2019	5	0
Montenegro	2020	2	0
Montenegro	2021	0	0
Montenegro	2022	1	0
Montenegro	2023	1	0
Montenegro	2024	0	0
Total		24	0

== Honours ==
Bokelj

- Montenegrin Second League: 2010-11, 2013-14
