= Mathias Pereira Lage =

Footballer (born 1996)

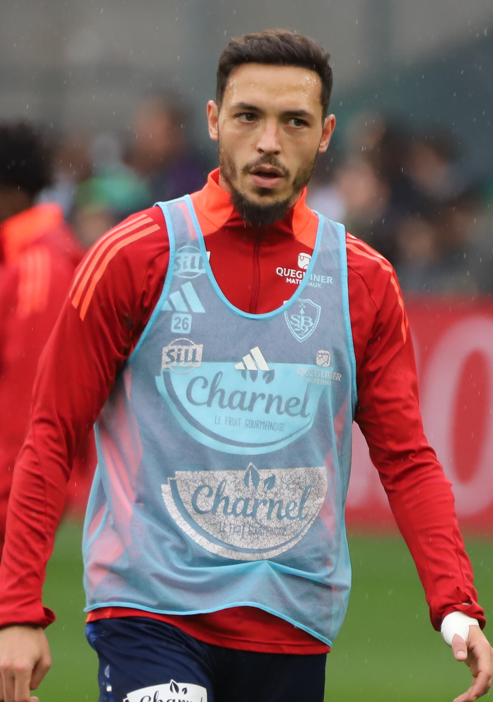
- Pereira Lage with Brest in 2025

Personal information
- Date of birth: 30 November 1996 (age 29)
- Place of birth: Clermont-Ferrand, France
- Height: 1.80 m (5 ft 11 in)
- Position: Midfielder

Team information
- Current team: FC St. Pauli
- Number: 28

Senior career*
Years	Team	Apps	(Gls)
2015–2019	Clermont B	23	(5)
2016–2019	Clermont	110	(20)
2019–2022	Angers	77	(9)
2022–2025	Brest	83	(7)
2025–	FC St. Pauli	28	(2)

International career
2018	Portugal U21	3	(0)
- * Club domestic league appearances and goals as of 22:30, 17 April 2026 (UTC)

Mathias Pereira Lage (born 30 November 1996) is a professional footballer who plays as a midfielder for 2. Bundesliga club FC St. Pauli. Born in France, he is a former Portugal youth international.

== Club career ==
On 12 February 2016, Pereira Lage made his senior debut, appearing with Clermont in a Ligue 2 match against Ajaccio after coming on as a substitute in the 55th minute. In just his second appearance on 1 April for the same competition, he scored his first professional goal, in the dying minutes of a 3–0 away win over Créteil. In June 2022, he joined Breton club Brest.

On 20 June 2025, Pereira Lage signed with FC St. Pauli in Germany.

== International career ==
Born in France, Pereira Lage is of Portuguese descent. He played for the Portugal U21s in 2018.

== Career statistics ==
As of match played 17 April 2026

Appearances and goals by club, season and competition
Club	Season	League			Cup		League Cup		Europe		Total	
Club	Season	Division	Apps	Goals	Apps	Goals	Apps	Goals	Apps	Goals	Apps	Goals
Clermont B	2014–15	CFA 2	6	2	—		—		—		6	2
Clermont B	2015–16	CFA 2	16	3	—		—		—		16	3
Clermont B	2016–17	CFA 2	1	0	—		—		—		1	0
Clermont B	Total		23	5	—		—		—		23	5
Clermont	2015–16	Ligue 2	6	1	0	0	0	0	—		6	1
Clermont	2016–17	Ligue 2	28	2	2	0	3	0	—		33	2
Clermont	2017–18	Ligue 2	38	10	1	0	2	0	—		41	10
Clermont	2018–19	Ligue 2	38	7	2	0	2	2	—		42	9
Clermont	Total		110	20	5	0	7	2	—		122	22
Angers	2019–20	Ligue 1	25	1	1	1	1	0	—		27	2
Angers	2020–21	Ligue 1	28	4	2	0	—		—		30	4
Angers	2021–22	Ligue 1	24	4	1	0	—		—		25	4
Angers	Total		77	9	4	1	1	0	—		82	10
Brest	2022–23	Ligue 1	24	2	0	0	—		—		24	2
Brest	2023–24	Ligue 1	30	3	3	0	—		—		33	3
Brest	2024–25	Ligue 1	29	2	4	1	—		9 (Note: Appearances in the UEFA Champions League)	1	42	4
Brest	Total		83	7	7	1	—		9	1	99	9
FC St. Pauli	2025–26	Bundesliga	28	2	4	1	—		—		32	3
Career total			321	43	20	3	8	2	9	1	358	49
