= Enzo Ebosse =

Cameroonian footballer (born 1999)

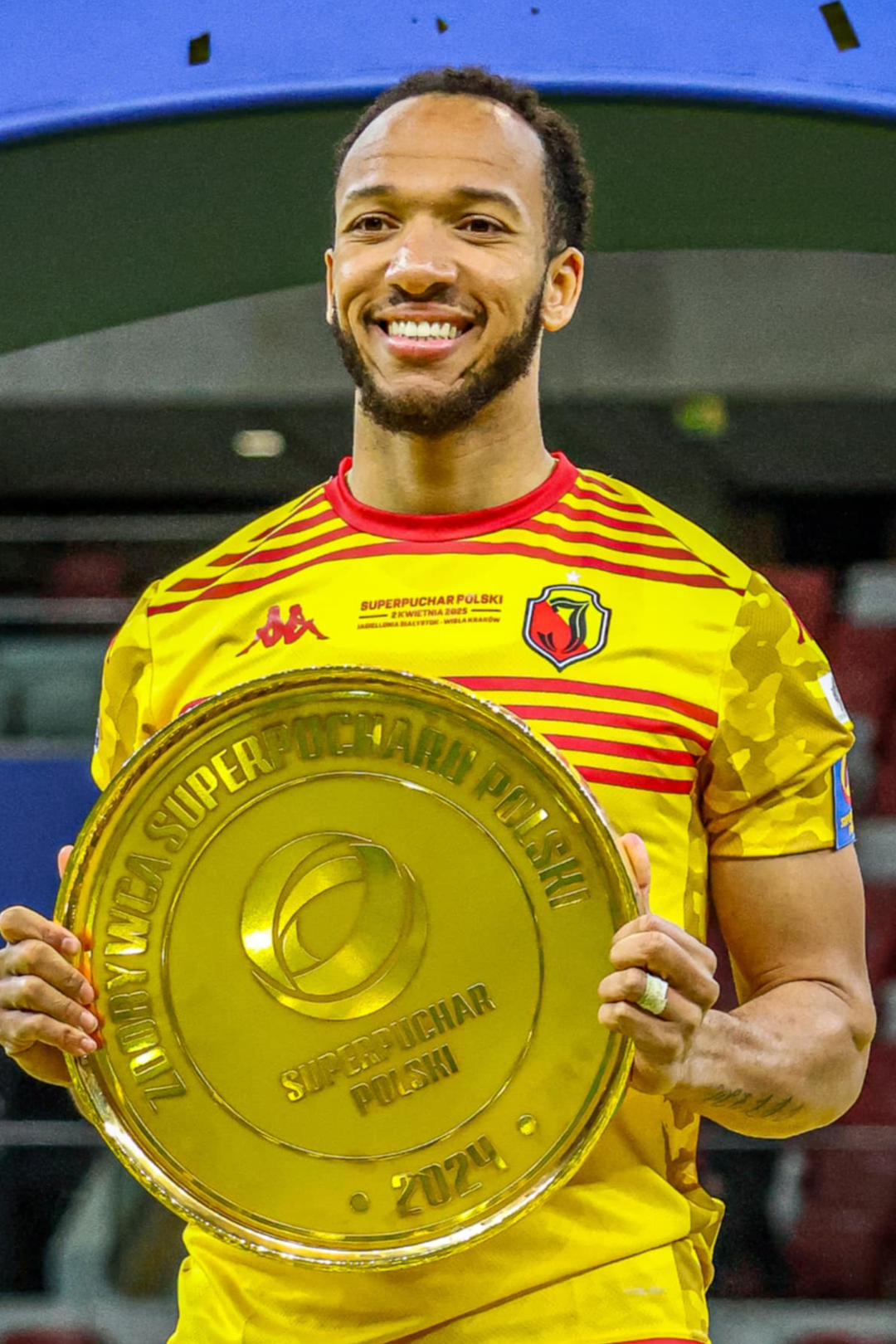
- Ebosse with Jagiellonia Białystok in 2025

Personal information
- Full name: Enzo Jacques Rodolphe Ebosse
- Date of birth: 11 March 1999 (age 27)
- Place of birth: Amiens, France
- Height: 1.85 m (6 ft 1 in)
- Position: Centre-back

Team information
- Current team: Udinese
- Number: 77

Youth career
- 2005–2015: Amiens
- 2015–2017: Lens

Senior career*
Years	Team	Apps	(Gls)
2016–2019	Lens B	69	(2)
2017–2019	Lens	2	(0)
2019–2020	Le Mans B	3	(0)
2019–2020	Le Mans	16	(0)
2020–2022	Angers	33	(0)
2022–	Udinese	24	(0)
2025	→ Jagiellonia Białystok (loan)	11	(0)
2025–2026	→ Hellas Verona (loan)	4	(0)
2026	→ Torino (loan)	13	(0)

International career^{‡}
2014–2015	France U16	7	(0)
2022–	Cameroon	3	(0)
Medal record
Representing Cameroon
Men's football
Africa Cup of Nations
Third place	2021 Cameroon
- * Club domestic league appearances and goals as of 22 August 2026 ‡ National team caps and goals as of 00:35, 7 December 2022 (UTC)

Enzo Jacques Rodolphe Ebosse (born 11 March 1999) is a professional footballer who plays as a centre-back for Serie A club Udinese. Born in France, he represents the Cameroon national team.

== Club career ==
On 23 August 2016, Ebosse made his professional debut for Lens in the Coupe de la Ligue against Paris FC. He made his league debut for RC Lens in a 2–0 Ligue 2 loss to US Orléans on 28 August 2017.

Ebosse joined Le Mans, newly promoted to Ligue 2, in 2019.

On 16 July 2020, Ebosse joined Angers SCO. He signed a three-year contract at the club.

On 29 July 2022, Ebosse signed a five-year contract with Udinese in Italy.

On 29 January 2025, he joined Polish club Jagiellonia Białystok on loan for the remainder of the season.

On 15 July 2025, Ebosse moved on loan to Hellas Verona, with a conditional obligation to buy. On 2 January 2026, Ebosse joined Torino on loan, with an option to buy.

== International career ==
Ebosse was born in Amiens, France, and is of Cameroonian descent. He debuted with the Cameroon national team in a friendly 2–0 loss to Uzbekistan on 23 September 2022.

== Career statistics ==
=== Club ===
As of match played 24 May 2025

Appearances and goals by club, season and competition
Club	Season	League			National cup (Note: Includes Coupe de France, Coppa Italia, Polish Cup)		Other		Total	
Club	Season	Division	Apps	Goals	Apps	Goals	Apps	Goals	Apps	Goals
Lens B	2015–16	CFA	9	0	—		—		9	0
Lens B	2016–17	CFA	18	0	—		—		18	0
Lens B	2017–18	Championnat National 2	17	0	—		—		17	0
Lens B	2018–19	Championnat National 2	25	2	—		—		25	2
Lens B	Total		69	2	—		—		69	2
Lens	2016–17	Ligue 2	0	0	—		1 (Note: Appearance(s) in Coupe de la Ligue)	0	1	0
Lens	2017–18	Ligue 2	1	0	1	0	1	0	3	0
Lens	2018–19	Ligue 2	1	0	1	0	—		2	0
Lens	Total		2	0	2	0	2	0	6	0
Le Mans B	2019–20	Championnat National 3	5	0	—		—		5	0
Le Mans	2019–20	Ligue 2	16	0	1	0	2	0	19	0
Angers	2020–21	Ligue 1	6	0	—		—		6	0
Angers	2021–22	Ligue 1	27	0	1	0	—		28	0
Angers	Total		33	0	1	0	—		34	0
Udinese	2022–23	Serie A	20	0	2	0	—		2	0
Udinese	2023–24	Serie A	1	0	0	0	—		1	0
Udinese	2024–25	Serie A	2	0	1	0	—		3	0
Udinese	Total		23	0	3	0	—		26	0
Jagiellonia Białystok (loan)	2024–25	Ekstraklasa	11	0	1	0	7 (Note: Six appearances in UEFA Conference League, one appearance in Polish Super Cup)	0	19	0
Career total			159	2	8	0	11	0	178	2

=== International ===
Appearances and goals by national team and year
National team	Year	Apps	Goals
Cameroon	2022	3	0
Total		3	0

== Honours ==
Jagiellonia Białystok

- Polish Super Cup: 2024

Cameroon

- Africa Cup of Nations third place: 2021
