= Souleyman Doumbia =

Ivorian footballer (born 1996)

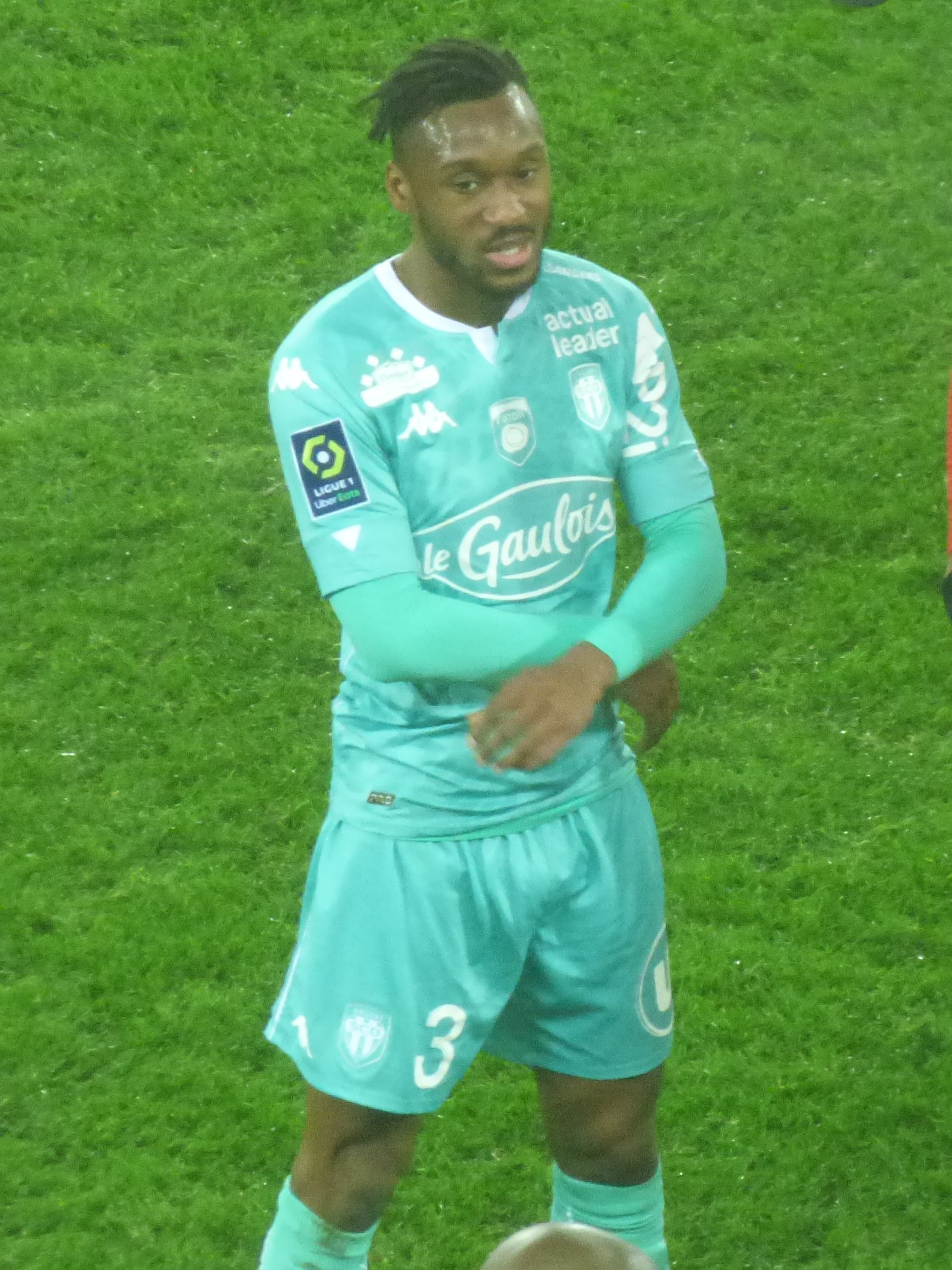
- Doumbia with Angers in 2020

Personal information
- Full name: Souleyman Keli Doumbia
- Date of birth: 24 September 1992 (age 34)
- Place of birth: Paris, France
- Height: 1.83 m (6 ft 0 in)
- Position: Left-back

Youth career
- 2009–2016: Paris Saint-Germain

Senior career*
Years	Team	Apps	(Gls)
2014–2016	Paris Saint-Germain B	15	(0)
2016–2018	Bari	5	(0)
2017	→ Vicenza (loan)	3	(0)
2017–2018	→ Grasshoppers (loan)	32	(0)
2018	Grasshoppers	15	(0)
2019–2020	Rennes II	4	(0)
2019–2020	Rennes	8	(0)
2020	→ Angers (loan)	5	(0)
2020–2023	Angers	78	(0)
2024–2026	Standard Liège	21	(0)
2025	→ Charlotte FC (loan)	11	(0)

International career^{‡}
2015	Ivory Coast U20	3	(0)
2015	Ivory Coast U23	2	(0)
2019–	Ivory Coast	8	(1)
- * Club domestic league appearances and goals as of 23 May 2026 ‡ National team caps and goals as of 12 March 2025

Souleyman Keli Doumbia (born 24 September 1996) is a professional footballer who plays as a left-back. Born in France, he plays for the Ivory Coast national team.

== Club career ==
=== Early career ===
Doumbia was part of the Paris Saint-Germain youth academy from 2009 to 2016. In the summer of 2016, he was transferred to Serie B club Bari, where he made his professional debut on 22 October versus Trapani. On 31 January 2017, Doumbia joined fellow Serie B side Vicenza on loan.

=== Rennes ===
In January 2019 he signed a three-year contract with Rennes.

=== Angers ===
In January 2020, Doumbia joined Angers on loan until the end of the 2019–20 season. In July 2020, Angers exercised their option to sign him permanently for a reported transfer fee of about €3 million. Doumbia signed a three-year contract.

=== Standard Liège ===
On 24 January 2024, Doumbia joined Belgian Pro League club Standard Liège on a contract until the end of the season with the option for a further year.

=== Charlotte FC ===
On 12 March 2025, Doumbia would move to the United States joining Charlotte FC on loan for their 2025 season. Doumbia's loan was terminated by Charlotte on 19 August 2025.

== International career ==
Doumbia was born in France to parents of Ivorian descent. He was first called up to represent the Ivory Coast U20s for the 2015 Toulon Tournament. He also started for the Ivory Coast U23s in a 5–1 friendly loss to the France U21s. He made his Ivory Coast national football team debut on 15 June 2019 in a friendly against Uganda, as a starter.

== Career statistics ==
=== Club ===
As of As of March 13, 2025.

Appearances and goals by club, season and competition
Club	Season	League			Cup		League Cup		Continental		Other		Total	
Club	Season	Division	Apps	Goals	Apps	Goals	Apps	Goals	Apps	Goals	Apps	Goals	Apps	Goals
Paris Saint-Germain II	2013–14	CFA	0	0	—		—		—		0	0	0	0
Paris Saint-Germain II	2014–15	CFA	5	0	—		—		—		0	0	5	0
Paris Saint-Germain II	2015–16	CFA	10	0	—		—		—		0	0	10	0
Paris Saint-Germain II	Total		15	0	—		—		—		0	0	15	0
Bari	2016–17	Serie B	5	0	0	0	—		—		0	0	5	0
Bari	Total		5	0	—		—		—		0	0	5	0
Vicenza (loan)	2016–17	Serie B	3	0	0	0	—		—		0	0	3	0
Vicenza (loan)	Total		3	0	—		—		—		0	0	3	0
Grasshoppers (loan)	2017–18	Swiss Super League	32	0	3	0	—		—		0	0	35	0
Grasshoppers	2018–19	Swiss Super League	15	0	1	0	—		—		0	0	16	0
Grasshoppers	Total		47	0	4	0	—		—		0	0	51	0
Rennes	2018–19	Ligue 1	7	0	0	0	2	0	0	0	0	0	9	0
Rennes	2019–20	Ligue 1	1	0	0	0	0	0	2	0	0	0	3	0
Rennes	Total		8	0	0	0	2	0	2	0	0	0	12	0
Angers (loan)	2019–20	Ligue 1	5	0	0	0	0	0	—		0	0	5	0
Angers	2020–21	Ligue 1	27	0	1	0	—		—		0	0	28	0
Angers	2021–22	Ligue 1	27	0	1	0	—		—		0	0	28	0
Angers	2022–23	Ligue 1	24	0	2	0	—		—		0	0	26	0
Angers	Total		78	0	4	0	—		—		0	0	82	0
Standard Liège	2023-24	Belgian Pro League	11	0	0	0	—		—		0	0	11	0
Standard Liège	2024-25	Belgian Pro League	10	0	0	0	1	0	—		0	0	11	0
Standard Liège	Total		21	0	0	0	1	0	—		0	0	22	0
Charlotte FC	2025	MLS	0	0	0	0	0	0	—		0	0	0	0
Career total			182	0	8	0	2	0	2	0	0	0	198	0
