= Angelo Fulgini =

New Caledonian footballer (born 1996)

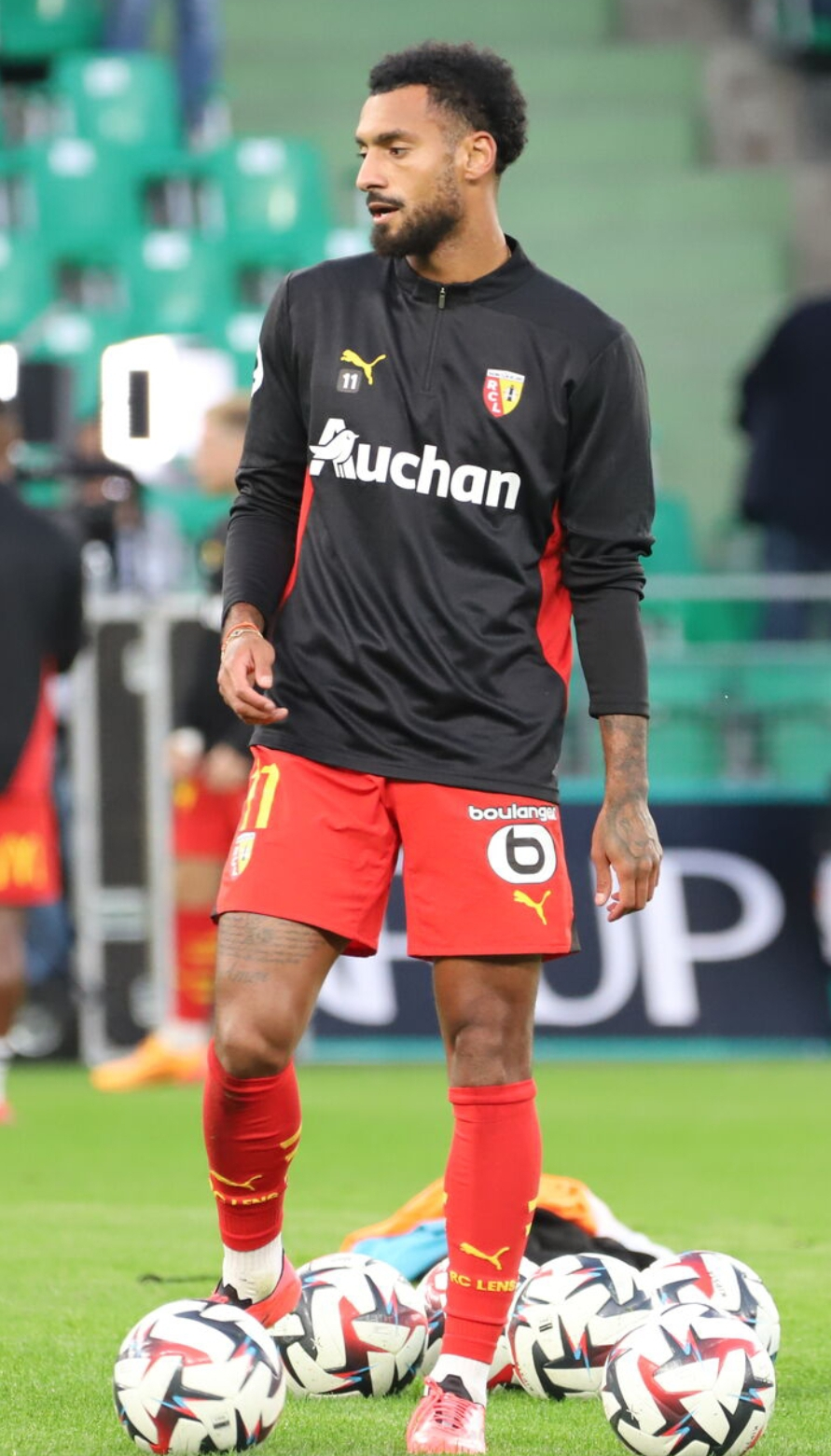
- Fulgini with Lens in 2024

Personal information
- Full name: Angelo Luigi Fulgini
- Date of birth: 20 August 1996 (age 30)
- Place of birth: Abidjan, Ivory Coast
- Height: 1.83 m (6 ft 0 in)
- Position: Midfielder

Team information
- Current team: Al-Khaleej FC
- Number: 10

Youth career
- 2002–2003: AS de Saint-Paul-en-Forêt
- 2003–2005: FC Vidauban
- 2005–2007: Douai
- 2007–2013: Valenciennes

Senior career*
| Years | Team | Apps | (Gls) |
| 2013–2016 | Valenciennes B | 19 | (2) |
| 2015–2017 | Valenciennes | 80 | (8) |
| 2017–2022 | Angers | 149 | (20) |
| 2018–2019 | Angers II | 4 | (3) |
| 2022–2023 | Mainz 05 | 16 | (0) |
| 2023 | → Lens (loan) | 17 | (1) |
| 2023–2026 | Lens | 52 | (2) |
| 2025–2026 | → Al Taawoun (loan) | 30 | (5) |
| 2026– | Al-Khaleej | 0 | (0) |

International career^{‡}
| 2012–2013 | France U17 | 7 | (0) |
| 2013–2014 | France U18 | 4 | (0) |
| 2014–2015 | France U19 | 15 | (0) |
| 2015–2016 | France U20 | 9 | (0) |
| 2017 | France U21 | 3 | (0) |
| 2026– | New Caledonia | 1 | (0) |
- * Club domestic league appearances and goals as of 21 May 2026 ‡ National team caps and goals as of 27 March 2026

Angelo Luigi Fulgini (Italian: [ˈandʒelo luˈiːdʒi fulˈdʒini]; born 20 August 1996) is a professional footballer who plays as a midfielder for Saudi Pro League club Al-Khaleej. Born to French citizens in Ivory Coast, he was a former youth international for France before opting to play for the New Caledonia national team.

== Club career ==
=== Valenciennes ===
Fulgini started his career at Valenciennes, originally playing for their B team, however in 2015 he was promoted to the first team after a string of good performances.

=== Angers ===
In 2017, he signed for Angers for a fee of €1.4 million.

=== Mainz 05 ===
On 12 July 2022, Mainz 05 announced the signing of Fulgini on four-year deal, for an undisclosed fee.

=== Lens ===
On 1 February 2023, Fulgini signed with Lens on an initial loan. Lens held an obligation to purchase his rights permanently at the end of the loan term. For his second appearance with Lens on 9 February, he scored his first goal against Lorient in Coupe de France. He scored his first Ligue 1 goal with Lens on 25 February 2023 in a 1–1 away draw against Montpellier. On 20 September 2023, he scored a goal from a direct free kick on his Champions League debut in a 1–1 away draw against Sevilla.

=== Al-Taawoun ===
On 31 August 2025, Fulgini joined Saudi Pro League club Al-Taawoun on a one-year loan.

== International career ==
Fulgini is a former youth international for France. On 15 December 2025, his request to switch international allegiance to New Caledonia was approved by FIFA.

In March 2026, Fulgini received his first call up to the New Caledonia national team for the 2026 FIFA World Cup inter-confederation play-off game against Jamaica.

== Career statistics ==
As of match played 22 May 2026

Appearances and goals by club, season and competition
| Club | Season | League | | | National cup (Note: Includes Coupe de France, DFB-Pokal, King's Cup) | | League cup (Note: Includes Coupe de la Ligue) | | Continental | | Other | | Total | |
| Club | Season | Division | Apps | Goals | Apps | Goals | Apps | Goals | Apps | Goals | Apps | Goals | Apps | Goals |
|---|---|---|---|---|---|---|---|---|---|---|---|---|---|---|
| Valenciennes | 2014–15 | Ligue 2 | 16 | 0 | 1 | 0 | — | | — | | — | | 17 | 1 |
| Valenciennes | 2015–16 | Ligue 2 | 29 | 2 | 2 | 0 | 1 | 1 | — | | — | | 32 | 3 |
| Valenciennes | 2016–17 | Ligue 2 | 35 | 6 | 1 | 0 | 1 | 0 | — | | — | | 37 | 6 |
| Valenciennes | Total | | 80 | 8 | 4 | 0 | 2 | 1 | 0 | 0 | 0 | 0 | 86 | 9 |
| Angers | 2017–18 | Ligue 1 | 29 | 3 | 1 | 0 | 2 | 1 | — | | — | | 32 | 4 |
| Angers | 2018–19 | Ligue 1 | 31 | 4 | 1 | 0 | 1 | 0 | — | | — | | 33 | 4 |
| Angers | 2019–20 | Ligue 1 | 20 | 1 | 3 | 0 | 0 | 0 | — | | — | | 23 | 1 |
| Angers | 2020–21 | Ligue 1 | 33 | 7 | 3 | 3 | — | | — | | — | | 36 | 10 |
| Angers | 2021–22 | Ligue 1 | 36 | 5 | 0 | 0 | — | | — | | — | | 36 | 5 |
| Angers | Total | | 149 | 20 | 8 | 3 | 3 | 1 | 0 | 0 | 0 | 0 | 160 | 24 |
| Angers II | 2019–20 | Championnat National 2 | 4 | 3 | — | | — | | — | | — | | 4 | 3 |
| Mainz 05 | 2022–23 | Bundesliga | 16 | 0 | 2 | 0 | — | | — | | — | | 18 | 0 |
| Lens (loan) | 2022–23 | Ligue 1 | 17 | 1 | 2 | 1 | — | | — | | — | | 19 | 2 |
| Lens | 2023–24 | Ligue 1 | 29 | 1 | 1 | 0 | — | | 8 (Note: Six appearances and one goal in UEFA Champions League, two appearances in UEFA Europa League) | 2 | — | | 38 | 3 |
| Lens | 2024–25 | Ligue 1 | 23 | 1 | 1 | 0 | — | | 1 (Note: Appearance in UEFA Europa League) | 0 | — | | 25 | 1 |
| Lens | Total | | 52 | 2 | 2 | 0 | — | | 9 | 0 | — | | 63 | 4 |
| Al-Taawoun (loan) | 2025–26 | Saudi Pro League | 30 | 5 | 2 | 0 | — | | — | | — | | 32 | 5 |
| Al-Khaleej | 2026–27 | Saudi Pro League | | | | | | | | | | | | |
| Career total | | | 348 | 39 | 20 | 4 | 5 | 2 | 9 | 2 | 0 | 0 | 382 | 45 |

== Personal life ==
Fulgini was born in Abidjan, Ivory Coast to a metropolitan French father of Italian descent, and a New Caledonian mother. He holds dual French and Ivorian nationalities.
