= Noah Fatar =

French footballer (born 2002)

Personal information
- Date of birth: 15 February 2002 (age 24)
- Place of birth: L'Isle-Adam, France
- Height: 1.70 m (5 ft 7 in)
- Position: Forward

Team information
- Current team: Boulogne
- Number: 11

Youth career
- 2007–2012: FC Puiseux-Louvres
- 2012–2014: ES Marly-la-Ville
- 2014–2017: USM Senlis
- 2017–2020: Lille

Senior career*
Years	Team	Apps	(Gls)
2019–2020	Lille II	5	(0)
2020–2023	Angers II	19	(6)
2021–2023	Angers	7	(0)
2022–2023	→ Cholet (loan)	25	(6)
2023–2025	Sochaux	54	(6)
2025–	Boulogne	30	(3)
- * Club domestic league appearances and goals as of 12 May 2026

Noah Fatar (born 15 February 2002) is a French professional footballer who plays as a forward for Ligue 2 club Boulogne.

== Club career ==
Noah Fatar came through the ranks of Lille, first impressing in the UEFA Youth League, where he scored against Chelsea and Valencia, helping his team win on both occasions.

But Fatar eventually signed his first professional contract with Angers SCO, after refusing an offer from Everton, starting the 2020–21 season with Angers B team in National 2.

Noah Fatar made his debut with the first team on the 7 March 2021, coming on as a substitute and scoring in Angers 5-0 Coupe de France win against the Club Franciscain.

He made his Ligue 1 debut with Angers on the 4 April 2021, coming on as a substitute in the 1–1 home draw against Montpellier HSC.

On 4 August 2022, Fatar joined Cholet in Championnat National on a season-long loan.

== Personal life ==
Born in France, Fatar holds both French and Moroccan nationalities.
