= Thomas Mangani =

French footballer (born 1987)

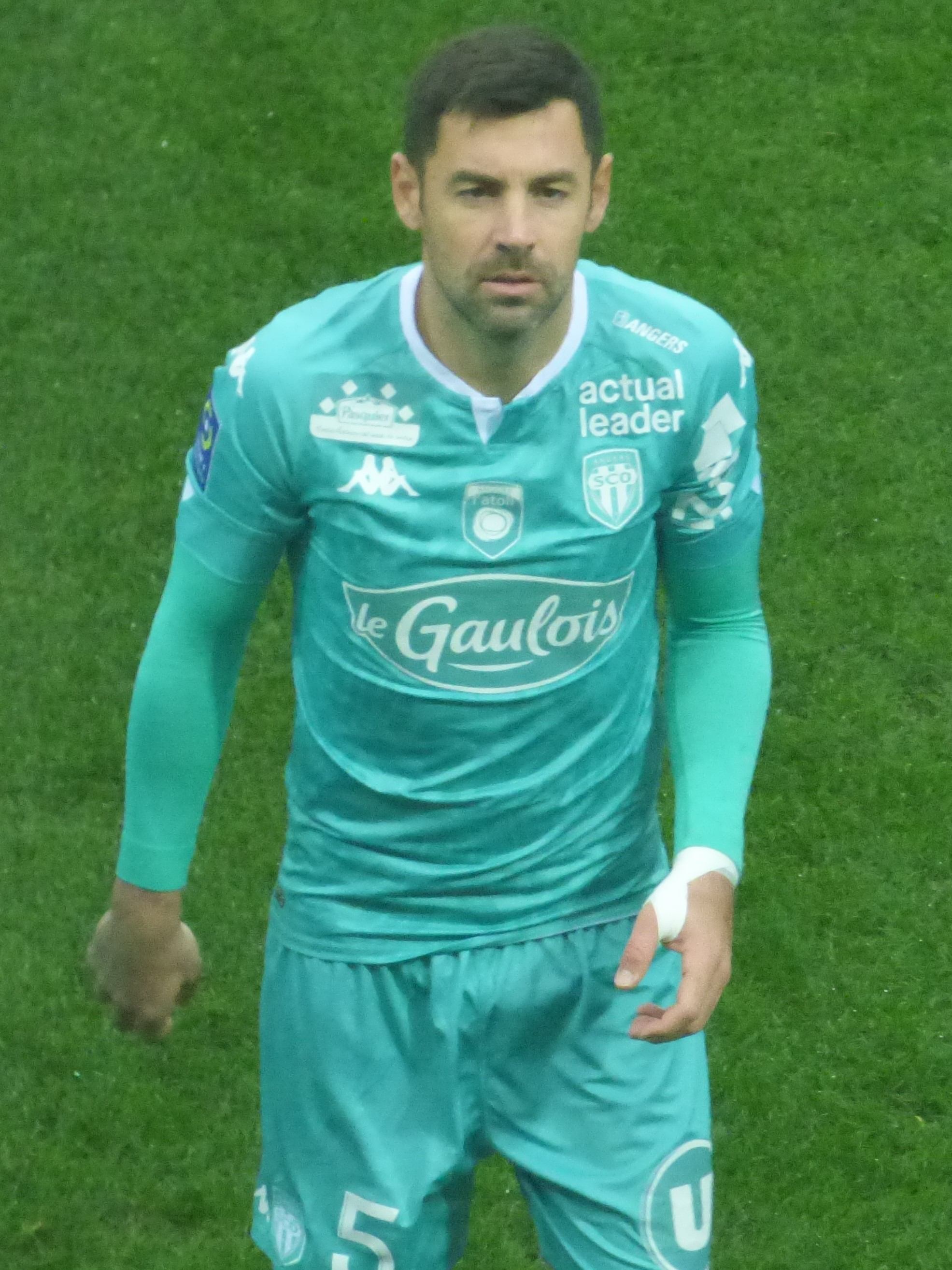
- Mangani with Angers in 2020

Personal information
- Full name: Thomas Mathieu Romain Mangani
- Date of birth: 29 April 1987 (age 39)
- Place of birth: Carpentras, France
- Height: 1.83 m (6 ft 0 in)
- Position: Midfielder

Youth career
- Monaco

Senior career*
Years	Team	Apps	(Gls)
2005–2012	Monaco	45	(2)
2007	→ Brest (loan)	13	(0)
2007–2008	→ Ajaccio (loan)	34	(0)
2011–2012	→ Nancy (loan)	24	(0)
2012	→ Nancy B (loan)	1	(0)
2010	Monaco B	1	(0)
2012–2014	Nancy	70	(1)
2012–2013	Nancy B	2	(0)
2014–2015	Chievo	1	(0)
2015	→ Angers (loan)	15	(2)
2015–2022	Angers	223	(25)
2022–2025	Ajaccio	81	(3)
Total		510	(33)
- * Club domestic league appearances and goals

Thomas Mathieu Romain Mangani (born 29 April 1987) is a French former professional footballer who played as a midfielder.

== Career ==
In summer 2014, Mangani left France to play for Chievo, signing a two-year contract with the Serie A club on 6 July 2014. However, after a disappointing season in Italy, where he only played 45 minutes for Chievo, Mangani returned to France with Angers, with whom he signed a three-year deal on 4 July 2015.

On 13 June 2022, Mangani signed a two-year contract with newly-promoted Ligue 1 side Ajaccio, returning to the club after fourteen years.

== Personal life ==
Mangani holds both French and Italian nationalities.
