= Jimmy Cabot =

French footballer (born 1994)

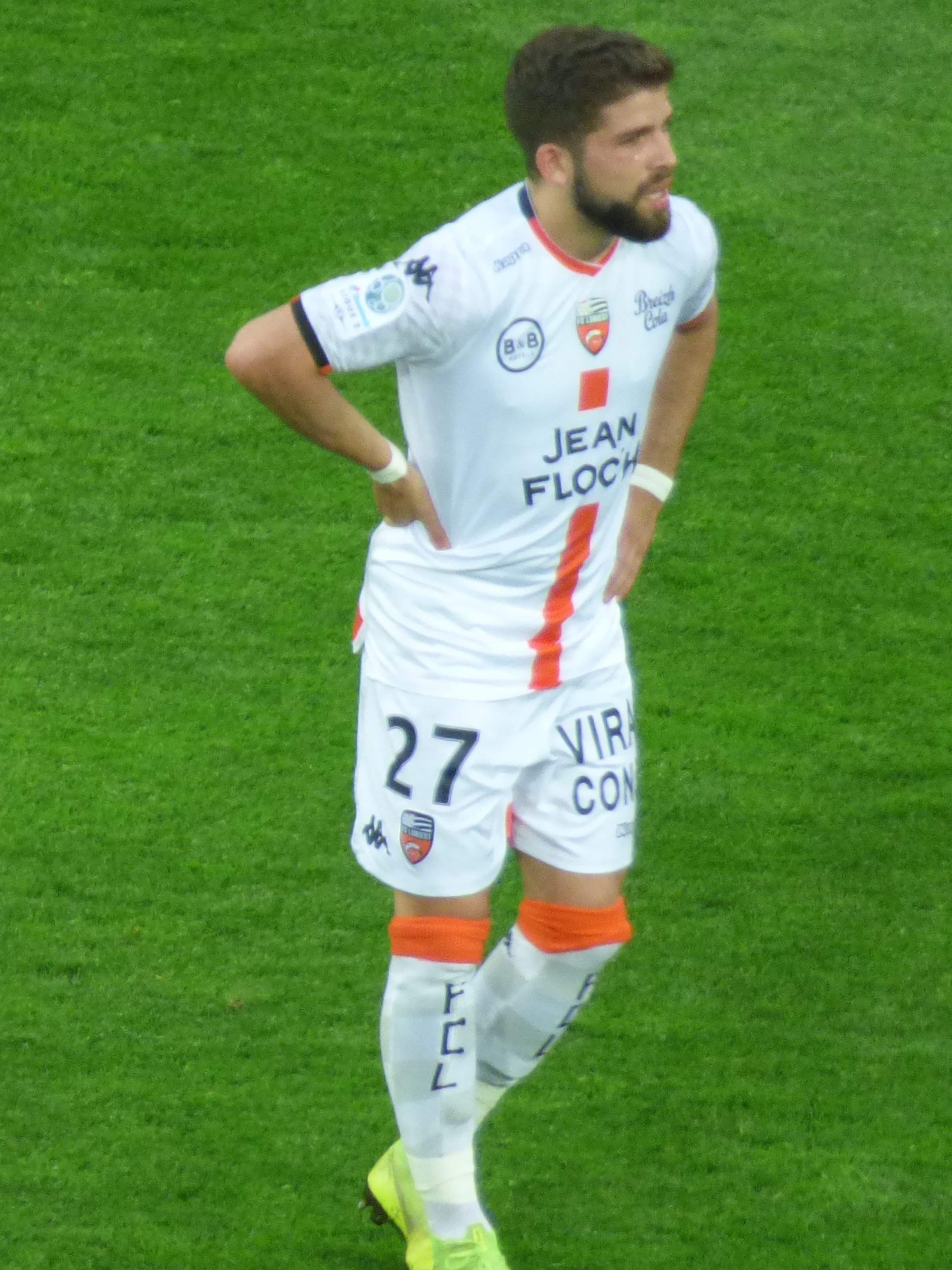
- Cabot with Lorient in 2019

Personal information
- Date of birth: 18 April 1994 (age 32)
- Place of birth: Chambéry, France
- Height: 1.64 m (5 ft 5 in)
- Position: Winger

Youth career
- 2003–2005: FC Villargondran
- 2005–2009: Maurienne
- 2009–2013: Troyes

Senior career*
Years	Team	Apps	(Gls)
2012–2015	Troyes II	42	(22)
2013–2016	Troyes	53	(6)
2016–2020	Lorient	126	(12)
2016–2018	Lorient II	3	(0)
2020–2022	Angers	46	(1)
2022–2024	Lens	11	(0)
2024	Lens II	1	(0)
Total		282	(41)
- * Club domestic league appearances and goals

Jimmy Cabot (born 18 April 1994) is a French former professional footballer who played as a winger.

== Career ==
Born in Chambéry, France, Cabot made his Ligue 2 debut for Troyes AC during the 2012–13 season. On 16 August 2013, he scored his first professional goal against Nîmes Olympique in a 3–2 away defeat. On 21 February 2014, he scored his second league goal against AS Nancy in a 2–0 home win in Stade de l'Aube.

Cabot left Lorient after the club's promotion to Ligue 1 in the 2019–20 season. On 25 September 2020, he signed a three-year contract with Angers, and chose the number 11 shirt at the club.

On 22 June 2022, Cabot signed a four-year contract with Lens. On 15 October 2022, he suffered a knee injury against Montpellier that would make him miss the rest of the season. On 19 December 2024, he was forced to retire due to his injury, having spent more than two years without playing.
