= Romain Thomas =

French footballer (born 1988)

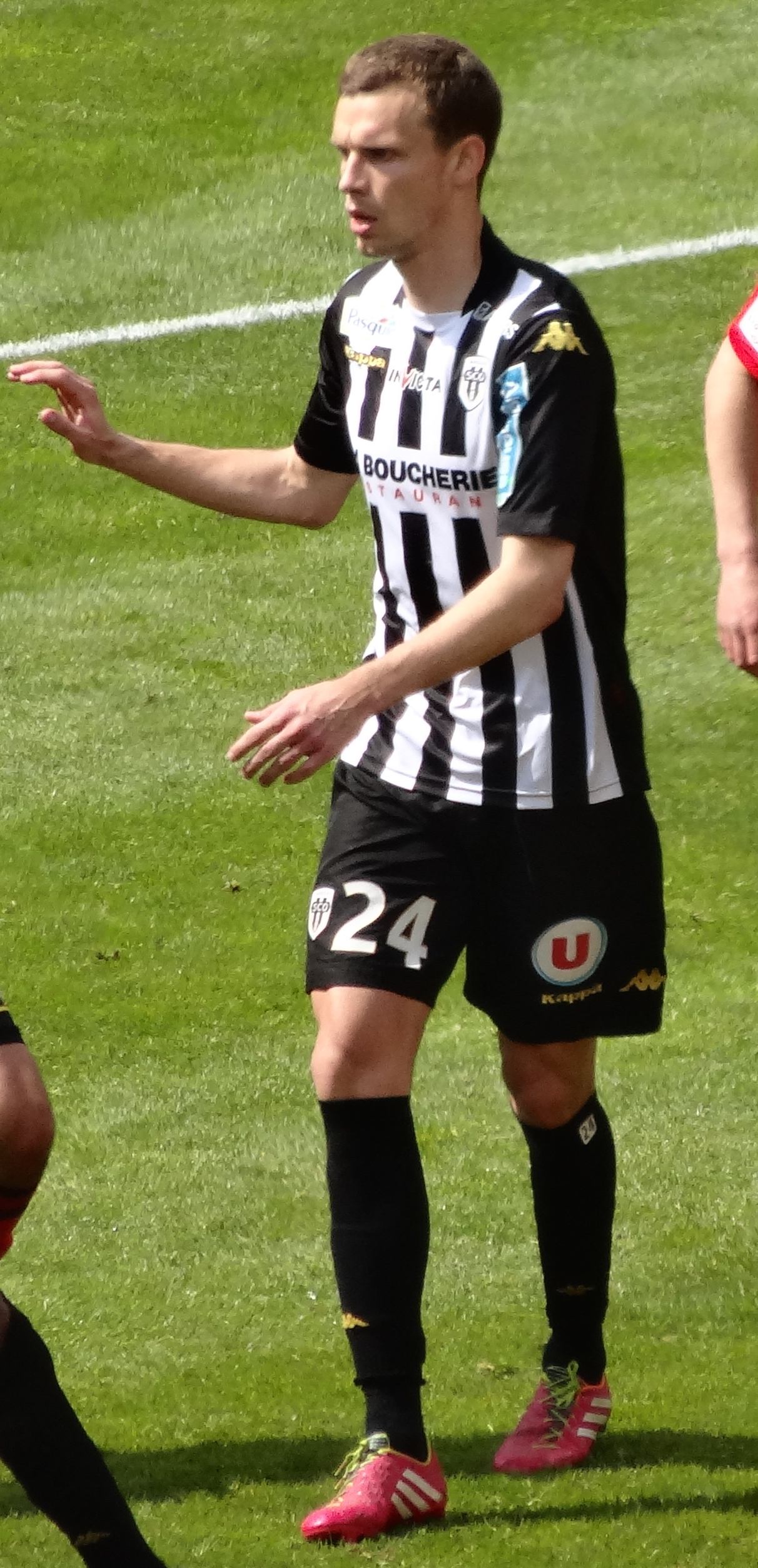
- Thomas with Angers in 2014

Personal information
- Date of birth: 12 June 1988 (age 38)
- Place of birth: Landerneau, France
- Height: 1.93 m (6 ft 4 in)
- Position: Defender

Team information
- Current team: Brest (U19 assistant coach)

Youth career
- Brest

Senior career*
Years	Team	Apps	(Gls)
2007–2010	Brest	3	(0)
2008–2009	→ Pacy Vallée-d'Eure (loan)	27	(1)
2010–2013	Carquefou	96	(6)
2013–2022	Angers	289	(20)
2022–2025	Caen	97	(8)
2025–2026	Valenciennes	8	(0)

International career
2008–2011	Brittany		

Managerial career
- 2026–: Brest (U19 assistant)
- * Club domestic league appearances and goals

Romain Thomas (born 12 June 1988) is a French professional football coach and a former defender. He is an assistant coach with the Under-19 squad of Brest.

== Career ==
Born in Landerneau, Thomas started his career with Stade Brestois 29, where he played 3 games in Ligue 2 between 2007 and 2010. During the 2008–09 season, he had a loan spell at Pacy Vallée-d'Eure. Ahead of the 2010–11 campaign, Thomas signed for Championnat de France amateur side USJA Carquefou where he spent three seasons, making 96 league appearances for the club.

Thomas joined Angers in June 2013. In August 2017, it was announced he had agreed a contract extension until 2022 with the club.

On 17 June 2022, Thomas signed a three-year contract with Caen.
