= 2020–21 Ligue 1 =

83rd season of top-tier French football

Ligue 1
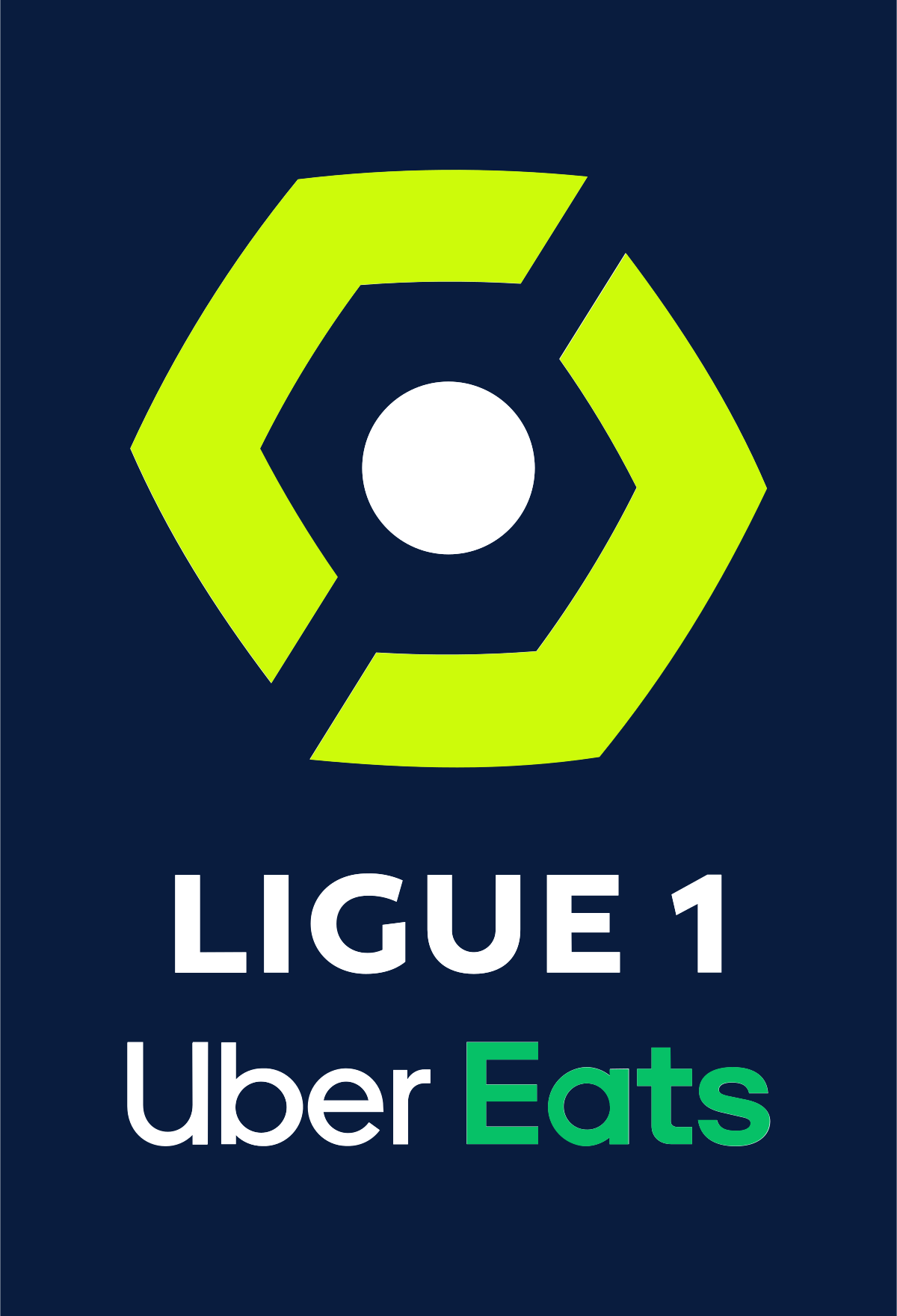
- Season: 2020–21
- Dates: 21 August 2020 – 23 May 2021
- Champions: Lille; 4th Ligue 1 title 6th French title
- Relegated: Nîmes; Dijon
- Champions League: Lille; Paris Saint-Germain; Monaco
- Europa League: Lyon; Marseille
- Europa Conference League: Rennes
- Matches: 380
- Goals: 1,049 (2.76 per match)
- Top goalscorer: Kylian Mbappé (27 goals)
- Biggest home win: Paris Saint-Germain 6–1 Angers (2 October 2020); Strasbourg 5–0 Nîmes (6 January 2021)
- Biggest away win: Saint-Étienne 0–5 Lyon (24 January 2021)
- Highest scoring: Lens 4–4 Reims (8 November 2020)
- Longest winning run: Paris Saint-Germain (8 matches)
- Longest unbeaten run: Lyon (16 matches)
- Longest winless run: Dijon; Nantes (15 matches)
- Longest losing run: Dijon (12 matches)

The 2020–21 Ligue 1 season, also known as Ligue 1 Uber Eats for sponsorship reasons, was a French association football tournament within Ligue 1. It was the 83rd season since its establishment. The season started on 21 August 2020 and ended on 23 May 2021. The league fixtures were announced on 9 July 2020.

Paris Saint-Germain were the three-time defending champions, after they were awarded the title for the previous season following the league's cancellation due to the COVID-19 pandemic.

Following a 2–1 win against Angers on the final day of the season, Lille secured a fourth French league title, and their first since 2011.

== Teams ==
=== Changes ===
Lorient and Lens were promoted from the 2019–20 Ligue 2. After the French court had initially ruled that the season would proceed with 22 teams, the relegation of Amiens and Toulouse to the 2020–21 Ligue 2 was confirmed on 23 June 2020, following a vote by the LFP.

Promoted to 2020–21 Ligue 1	Relegated from 2019–20 Ligue 1
Lorient; Lens	Amiens; Toulouse

=== Stadiums and locations ===
Location of teams in 2020–21 Ligue 1

Club	Location	Venue	Capacity	2019–20 season
Angers	Angers	Stade Raymond Kopa	18,752	11th
Bordeaux	Bordeaux	Matmut Atlantique	42,115	12th
Brest	Brest	Stade Francis-Le Blé	15,931	14th
Dijon	Dijon	Stade Gaston Gérard	15,995	16th
Lens	Lens	Stade Bollaert-Delelis	37,705	Ligue 2, 2nd
Lille	Lille	Stade Pierre-Mauroy	50,186	4th
Lorient	Lorient	Stade du Moustoir	18,890	Ligue 2, 1st
Lyon	Lyon	Groupama Stadium	59,186	7th
Marseille	Marseille	Orange Vélodrome	67,394	2nd
Metz	Metz	Stade Saint-Symphorien	25,636	15th
Monaco	Monaco	Stade Louis II	18,523	9th
Montpellier	Montpellier	Stade de la Mosson	32,900	8th
Nantes	Nantes	Stade de la Beaujoire	35,322	13th
Nice	Nice	Allianz Riviera	35,624	6th
Nîmes	Nîmes	Stade des Costières	18,482	18th
Paris Saint-Germain	Paris	Parc des Princes	48,583	1st
Reims	Reims	Stade Auguste Delaune	21,684	5th
Rennes	Rennes	Roazhon Park	29,778	3rd
Saint-Étienne	Saint-Étienne	Stade Geoffroy-Guichard	41,965	17th
Strasbourg	Strasbourg	Stade de la Meinau	29,230	10th

=== Personnel and kits ===
Team	Manager	Captain	Kit manufacturer	Shirt sponsor (front)	Shirt sponsor (back)	Shirt sponsor (sleeve)	Shorts sponsor	Socks sponsor
Angers	(France) Stéphane Moulin	(Ivory Coast) Ismaël Traoré	Kappa	Scania (H)/Le Gaulois (A & 3), L'Atoll Angers, Brioche Pasquier, Actual Leader, Angers	Algimouss	P2i	Système U	None
Bordeaux	(France) Jean-Louis Gasset	(France) Laurent Koscielny	Adidas	Bistro Régent	Betclic	None	None	None
Brest	(France) Olivier Dall'Oglio	(France) Jean-Kévin Duverne	Adidas	Quéguiner Matériaux (H)/Yaourts Malo (A & 3), SILL (H)/Groupe Quéguiner (A & 3), Breizh Cola, GUYOT Environnement, Oceania Hotels	Groupe Océanic	None	E.Leclerc, E.Leclerc Drive	BSP Securité
Dijon	(France) David Linarès	(Gabon) Bruno Ecuele Manga	Lotto	Groupe Roger Martin, DVF Group, Suez	DORAS	LCR, Auteur des Williams, Coup d'Pouce	Dalkia	Caisse d'Épargne
Lens	(France) Franck Haise	(France) Yannick Cahuzac	Macron	Auchan, Groupe Lempereur, SibelEnergie	None	Aushopping Noyelles	AÉSIO Mutuelle, McDonald's	None
Lille	(France) Christophe Galtier	(Portugal) José Fonte	New Balance	Boulanger, neosat, Métropole Européenne de Lille (H)/Hello Lille (A & 3)	Flunch	Midas Trend	Winamax	None
Lorient	(France) Christophe Pélissier	(France) Fabien Lemoine	Kappa	Jean Floc'h, Che Freedom Spirit, Breizh Cola	Olmix Group	Groupe Actual	Virage Conseil, B&B Hotels	None
Lyon	(France) Rudi Garcia	(Netherlands) Memphis Depay	Adidas	Emirates	Deliveroo, Groupe ALILA	None	Teddy Smith	None
Marseille	(Argentina) Jorge Sampaoli	(France) Steve Mandanda	Puma	Uber Eats, Parions Sport	Boulanger	Iqoniq	Hotels.com	None
Metz	(France) Frédéric Antonetti	(Tunisia) Dylan Bronn	Kappa	Car Avenue (H), MOSL, Axia Interim	technoit, Nacon Gaming (H), Forcepower (A & 3)	Eurométropole de Metz	E.Leclerc Moselle	None
Monaco	(Croatia) Niko Kovač	(France) Wissam Ben Yedder	Kappa	Fedcom, Triangle Intérim	Alain Afflelou	Iqoniq	VBET	None
Montpellier	(Armenia) Michel Der Zakarian	(Brazil) Hilton	Nike	Pasinobet, FAUN-Environnement, Montpellier Métropole, Groupama	NG Promotion, Sud de France	NG Promotion	Système U, Groupe Ilios	None
Nantes	(France) Antoine Kombouaré	(France) Abdoulaye Touré	Macron	Synergie, Manitou, Proginov	Préservation du Patrimoine, Groupe Millet	LNA Santé	Maisons Pierre, Flamino	None
Nice	(Romania) Adrian Ursea	(Brazil) Dante	Macron	Ineos	Ineos Grenadier	Belstaff	Ville de Nice	None
Nîmes	(France) Pascal Plancque	(France) Anthony Briançon	Puma	Bastide Médical, Nîmes	La Région Occitanie	None	None	None
Paris Saint-Germain	(Argentina) Mauricio Pochettino	(Brazil) Marquinhos	Nike	Accor Live Limitless	Ooredoo	QNB Group	None	None
Reims	(France) David Guion	(Morocco) Yunis Abdelhamid	Umbro	Maisons France Confort (H)/Hexaom (A & 3), Transports Caillot, ZEbet	SOS Malus	Triangle Intérim, Grand Reims (H), Reims (A & 3)	Crédit Agricole, Hexaom	None
Rennes	(France) Bruno Génésio	(France) Damien Da Silva	Puma	Samsic, Del Arte, Groupe Launay, Association ELA	PokerStars Sports, Blot Immobilier	rennes.fr	Convivio	None
Saint-Étienne	(France) Claude Puel	(France) Mathieu Debuchy	Le Coq Sportif	AÉSIO, Loire, Groupe BYmyCAR, Groupe Atrium	ASSE Cœur-Vert, Alain Afflelou	MARKAL	ZEbet, Desjoyaux Piscines	None
Strasbourg	(France) Thierry Laurey	(Serbia) Stefan Mitrović	Adidas	ÉS Énergies (H)/Winamax (A & 3), Hager, Pierre Schmidt (H), Stoeffler (A & 3)	Winamax (H)/ÉS Énergies (A & 3), Boulanger	Würth	Eurométropole de Strasbourg, LCR, Atheo	

=== Managerial changes ===
Team	Outgoing manager	Manner of departure	Date of vacancy	Position in table	Incoming manager	Date of appointment
Nîmes	(France) Bernard Blaquart	Mutual consent	23 June 2020	Pre-season	(France) Jérôme Arpinon	23 June 2020
Monaco	(Spain) Robert Moreno	Sacked	19 July 2020	Pre-season	(Croatia) Niko Kovač	19 July 2020
Bordeaux	(Portugal) Paulo Sousa	Resigned	10 August 2020	Pre-season	(France) Jean-Louis Gasset	10 August 2020
Metz	(France) Vincent Hognon	Mutual consent	12 October 2020	15th	(France) Frédéric Antonetti	12 October 2020
Dijon	(France) Stéphane Jobard	Sacked	5 November 2020	20th	(France) David Linarès	5 November 2020
Nice	(France) Patrick Vieira	Sacked	4 December 2020	11th	(Romania) Adrian Ursea	4 December 2020
Nantes	(France) Christian Gourcuff	Sacked	8 December 2020	14th	(France) Raymond Domenech	26 December 2020
Paris Saint-Germain	(Germany) Thomas Tuchel	Sacked	29 December 2020	3rd	(Argentina) Mauricio Pochettino	2 January 2021
Marseille	(Portugal) André Villas-Boas	Resigned and then sacked	2 February 2021	9th	(Argentina) Jorge Sampaoli	26 February 2021
Nîmes	(France) Jérôme Arpinon	Sacked	5 February 2021	20th	(France) Pascal Plancque	5 February 2021
Nantes	(France) Raymond Domenech	Sacked	10 February 2021	18th	(France) Antoine Kombouaré	11 February 2021
Rennes	(France) Julien Stéphan	Resigned	1 March 2021	9th	(France) Bruno Génésio	4 March 2021

== League table ==
Following the discontinuation of the Coupe de la Ligue at the end of the 2019–20 season, its European qualification place was given to the team finishing fifth in Ligue 1.

Pos	Team	Pld	W	D	L	GF	GA	GD	Pts	Qualification or relegation
1	Lille (C)	38	24	11	3	64	23	+41	83	Qualification for the Champions League group stage
2	Paris Saint-Germain	38	26	4	8	86	28	+58	82	Qualification for the Champions League group stage
3	Monaco	38	24	6	8	76	42	+34	78	Qualification for the Champions League third qualifying round
4	Lyon	38	22	10	6	81	43	+38	76	Qualification for the Europa League group stage (Note: Since the winners of the 2020–21 Coupe de France, Paris Saint-Germain, qualified for European competition based on league position, the Europa League group stage spot reserved for the cup winners was passed to the fifth-placed team, and the Europa Conference League play-off round spot was passed to the sixth-placed team.)
5	Marseille	38	16	12	10	54	47	+7	60	Qualification for the Europa League group stage
6	Rennes	38	16	10	12	52	40	+12	58	Qualification for the Europa Conference League play-off round
7	Lens	38	15	12	11	55	54	+1	57	
8	Montpellier	38	14	12	12	60	62	−2	54	
9	Nice	38	15	7	16	50	53	−3	52	
10	Metz	38	12	11	15	44	48	−4	47	
11	Saint-Étienne	38	12	10	16	42	54	−12	46	
12	Bordeaux	38	13	6	19	42	56	−14	45	
13	Angers	38	12	8	18	40	58	−18	44	
14	Reims	38	9	15	14	42	50	−8	42	
15	Strasbourg	38	11	9	18	49	58	−9	42	
16	Lorient	38	11	9	18	50	68	−18	42	
17	Brest	38	11	8	19	50	66	−16	41	
18	Nantes (O)	38	9	13	16	47	55	−8	40	Qualification for the Relegation play-offs
19	Nîmes (R)	38	9	8	21	40	71	−31	35	Relegation to the Ligue 2
20	Dijon (R)	38	4	9	25	25	73	−48	21	Relegation to the Ligue 2

Source: Ligue 1
Rules for classification: 1) Points; 2) Goal difference; 3) Goals scored; 4) Head-to-head goal difference; 5) Fairplay ranking.
(C) Champions; (O) Play-off winners; (R) Relegated

== Results ==
Home \ Away	ANG	BOR	BRE	DIJ	LEN	LIL	LOR	OL	OM	MET	ASM	MON	FCN	NIC	NMS	PSG	REI	REN	STE	STR
Angers	—	0–2	3–2	3–0	2–2	1–2	2–0	0–1	2–1	1–1	0–1	1–1	1–3	0–3	3–1	0–1	1–0	0–3	0–1	0–2
Bordeaux	2–1	—	1–0	3–0	3–0	0–3	2–1	0–0	0–0	1–2	0–3	0–2	0–0	0–0	2–0	0–1	1–3	1–0	1–2	2–3
Brest	0–0	2–1	—	3–1	1–1	3–2	3–2	2–3	2–3	2–4	1–0	2–2	1–4	2–0	1–1	0–2	2–1	1–2	4–1	0–3
Dijon	0–1	1–3	0–2	—	0–1	0–2	0–0	0–1	0–0	1–5	0–1	2–2	0–4	2–0	0–2	0–4	0–1	1–1	0–0	1–1
Lens	1–3	2–1	2–1	2–1	—	0–3	4–1	1–1	2–2	2–2	0–0	2–3	1–1	0–1	2–1	1–0	4–4	0–0	2–0	0–1
Lille	1–2	2–1	0–0	1–0	4–0	—	4–0	1–1	2–0	1–0	2–1	1–1	2–0	2–0	1–2	0–0	2–1	1–1	0–0	1–1
Lorient	2–0	4–1	1–0	3–2	2–3	1–4	—	1–1	0–1	2–1	2–5	0–1	0–2	1–1	3–0	3–2	1–0	0–3	2–1	3–1
Lyon	3–0	2–1	2–2	4–1	3–2	2–3	4–1	—	1–1	0–1	4–1	1–2	3–0	2–3	0–0	2–4	3–0	1–0	2–1	3–0
Marseille	3–2	3–1	3–1	2–0	0–1	1–1	3–2	1–1	—	1–1	2–1	3–1	3–1	3–2	1–2	0–2	1–1	1–0	0–2	1–1
Metz	0–1	0–0	0–2	1–1	2–0	0–2	3–1	1–3	1–1	—	0–1	1–1	2–0	1–1	0–3	1–3	2–1	1–3	2–0	1–2
Monaco	3–0	4–0	2–0	3–0	0–3	0–0	2–2	2–3	3–1	4–0	—	1–1	2–1	2–1	3–0	3–2	2–2	2–1	2–2	3–2
Montpellier	4–1	3–1	0–0	4–2	1–2	2–3	1–1	2–1	3–3	0–2	2–3	—	1–1	3–1	0–1	1–3	0–4	2–1	1–2	4–3
Nantes	1–1	3–0	3–1	1–1	1–1	0–2	1–1	1–2	1–1	1–1	1–2	1–2	—	1–2	2–1	0–3	1–2	0–0	2–2	0–4
Nice	3–0	0–3	3–2	1–3	2–1	1–1	2–2	1–4	3–0	1–2	1–2	3–1	2–1	—	2–1	0–3	0–0	0–1	0–1	0–2
Nîmes	1–5	2–0	4–0	1–3	1–1	0–1	1–0	2–5	0–2	0–1	3–4	1–1	1–1	0–2	—	0–4	2–2	2–4	0–2	1–1
Paris SG	6–1	2–2	3–0	4–0	2–1	0–1	2–0	0–1	0–1	1–0	0–2	4–0	1–2	2–1	3–0	—	4–0	3–0	3–2	4–0
Reims	0–0	1–2	1–0	0–0	1–1	0–1	1–3	1–1	1–3	0–0	0–1	0–0	3–2	0–0	0–1	0–2	—	2–2	3–1	2–1
Rennes	1–2	0–1	2–1	5–1	0–2	0–1	1–1	2–2	2–1	1–0	2–1	2–1	1–0	1–2	2–0	1–1	2–2	—	0–2	1–0
Saint-Étienne	0–0	4–1	1–2	0–1	2–3	1–1	2–0	0–5	1–0	1–0	0–4	0–1	1–1	1–3	2–2	1–1	1–1	0–3	—	2–0
Strasbourg	0–0	0–2	2–2	1–0	1–2	0–3	1–1	2–3	0–1	2–2	1–0	2–3	1–2	0–2	5–0	1–4	0–1	1–1	1–0	—

Source: Ligue 1
Legend: Blue = home team win; Yellow = draw; Red = away team win.
For upcoming matches, an "a" indicates there is an article about the rivalry between the two participants.

== Relegation play-offs ==
The 2020–21 season ended with a relegation play-off between the 18th-placed Ligue 1 team, Nantes, and the winner of the semi-final of the Ligue 2 play-off, Toulouse, on a two-legged confrontation.

1st leg

27 May 2021
20:45 CEST

Toulouse	1–2	Nantes
Machado 19'	Report	Blas 10'; Kolo Muani 22'

Stadium de Toulouse, Toulouse
Attendance: 0 (Behind closed doors)
Referee: Jérémie Pignard

2nd leg

30 May 2021
18:00 CEST

Nantes	0–1	Toulouse
	Report	Bayo 62'

Stade de la Beaujoire, Nantes
Attendance: 0 (Behind closed doors)
Referee: Benoît Bastien

2–2 on aggregate. Nantes won on away goals and therefore both clubs remained in their respective leagues.

== Season statistics ==
=== Top goalscorers ===
Rank	Player	Club	Goals
1	(France) Kylian Mbappé	Paris Saint-Germain	27
2	(France) Wissam Ben Yedder	Monaco	20
2	(Netherlands) Memphis Depay	Lyon	20
4	(France) Ludovic Ajorque	Strasbourg	16
4	(France) Gaëtan Laborde	Montpellier	16
4	(Germany) Kevin Volland	Monaco	16
4	(Turkey) Burak Yılmaz	Lille	16
8	(Algeria) Andy Delort	Montpellier	15
9	(Senegal) Boulaye Dia	Reims	14
9	(Nigeria) Terem Moffi	Lorient	14
9	(Cameroon) Karl Toko Ekambi	Lyon	14

=== Clean sheets ===
Rank	Player	Club	Clean sheets
1	(France) Mike Maignan	Lille	21
2	(Costa Rica) Keylor Navas	Paris Saint-Germain	15
3	(France) Benoît Costil	Bordeaux	14
4	(France) Benjamin Lecomte	Monaco	13
5	(Portugal) Anthony Lopes	Lyon	11
6	(Serbia) Predrag Rajković	Reims	10
7	(Argentina) Walter Benítez	Nice	9
7	(France) Paul Bernardoni	Angers	9
7	(France) Jessy Moulin	Saint-Étienne	9
10	(Japan) Eiji Kawashima	Strasbourg	8
10	(France) Jean-Louis Leca	Lens	8
10	(France) Steve Mandanda	Marseille	8
10	(Algeria) Alexandre Oukidja	Metz	8
10	(France) Baptiste Reynet	Nîmes	8

=== Hat-tricks ===
Player	Club	Against	Result	Date
(Netherlands) Memphis Depay	Lyon	Dijon	4–1 (H)	28 August 2020
(Senegal) Ibrahima Niane	Metz	Lorient	3–1 (H)	4 October 2020
(Senegal) Boulaye Dia	Reims	Montpellier	4–0 (A)	25 October 2020
(Russia) Aleksandr Golovin	Monaco	Nîmes	4–3 (A)	7 February 2021
(Tunisia) Wahbi Khazri	Saint-Étienne	Bordeaux	4–1 (H)	11 April 2021
(Nigeria) Terem Moffi	Lorient	Bordeaux	4–1 (H)	25 April 2021
(Poland) Arkadiusz Milik	Marseille	Angers	3–2 (H)	16 May 2021

=== Scoring ===
- First goal of the season:
  (Ivory Coast) Ismaël Traoré for Angers against Dijon
- Last goal of the season:
  (Poland) Arkadiusz Milik for Marseille against Metz

=== Discipline ===
==== Player ====
- Most yellow cards: 14
  - (Spain) Álvaro (Marseille)
- Most red cards: 3
  - (Guinea-Bissau) Moreto Cassamá (Reims)

==== Team ====
- Most yellow cards: 94
  - Marseille
- Most red cards: 10
  - Lyon
- Fewest yellow cards: 56
  - Strasbourg
- Fewest red cards: 2
  - Angers
  - Lille
  - Saint-Étienne

== Awards ==
=== Monthly ===
Month	Player of the Month		Ref.
Month	Player	Club	Ref.
September	(Senegal) Ibrahima Niane	Metz	
October	(France) Jonathan Bamba	Lille	
November	(Algeria) Andy Delort	Montpellier	
December	(Turkey) Yusuf Yazıcı	Lille	
January	(Algeria) Farid Boulaya	Metz	
February	(France) Kylian Mbappé	Paris Saint-Germain	
March	(Costa Rica) Keylor Navas	Paris Saint-Germain	
April	(Turkey) Burak Yılmaz	Lille	

=== Annual ===
Award	Winner	Club
Player of the Season	(France) Kylian Mbappé	Paris Saint-Germain
Young Player of the Season	(France) Aurélien Tchouaméni	Monaco
Goalkeeper of the Season	(Costa Rica) Keylor Navas	Paris Saint-Germain
Goal of the Season	(Turkey) Burak Yılmaz	Lille
Manager of the Season	(France) Christophe Galtier	Lille

Team of the Year
Goalkeeper	(Costa Rica) Keylor Navas (Paris Saint-Germain)				
Defenders	(France) Jonathan Clauss (Lens)	(Brazil) Marquinhos (Paris Saint-Germain)	(France) Presnel Kimpembe (Paris Saint-Germain)	(Mozambique) Reinildo Mandava (Lille)	
Midfielders	(Brazil) Neymar (Paris Saint-Germain)	(France) Aurélien Tchouaméni (Monaco)	(Brazil) Lucas Paquetá (Lyon)	(France) Benjamin André (Lille)	(France) Kylian Mbappé (Paris Saint-Germain
Forwards	(Netherlands) Memphis Depay (Lyon)				
