= 2018 Coupe de France final =

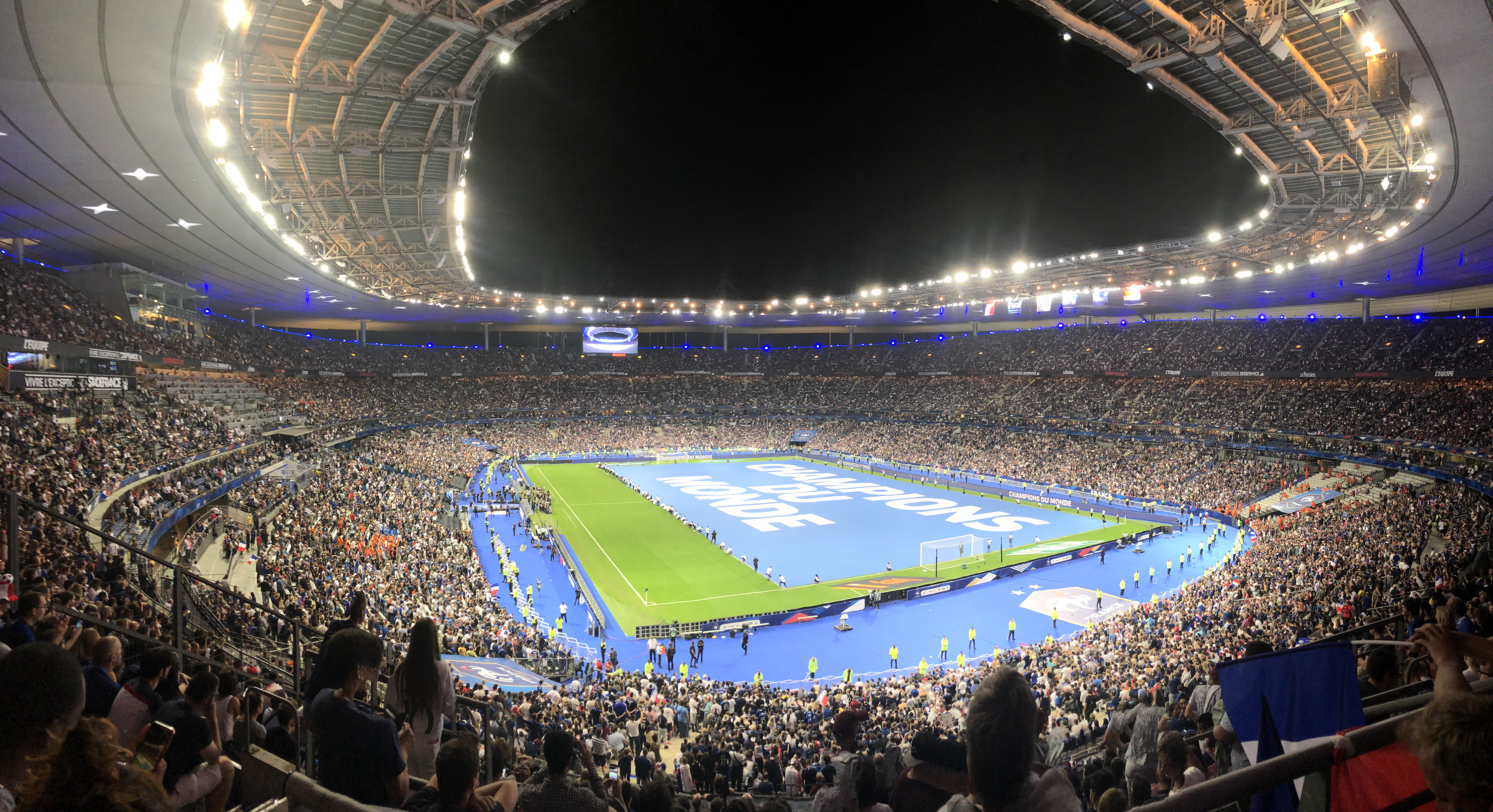
- The Stade de France hosted the final
- Event: 2017–18 Coupe de France
Les Herbiers VF	Paris Saint-Germain
Championnat National	Ligue 1
0	2
- Date: 8 May 2018
- Venue: Stade de France, Saint-Denis
- Referee: Mikael Lesage
- Attendance: 73,772

The 2018 Coupe de France final was a football match between Les Herbiers VF and Paris Saint-Germain to decide the winner of the 2017–18 Coupe de France, the 101st season of the Coupe de France.

Paris Saint-Germain won the final 2–0 for their 4th consecutive and 12th overall Coupe de France title.

== Background ==
The final was Les Herbiers' first. They upset many higher-level teams, such as Lens; however, they did not play any top-level teams en route to the final. Les Herbiers were the third team from the third division of French football to reach the final, after Nîmes, in 1996, and US Quevilly, in 2012. Both of these teams lost their matches, to Auxerre and Lyon respectively.

Meanwhile, Paris Saint-Germain were the three-time defending champion, having been to 15 finals and winning 11. They defeated Angers 1–0 in the 2017 final.

== Route to the final ==
Les Herbiers		Round	Paris Saint-Germain
Opponent	Result	2017–18 Coupe de France	Opponent	Result
JS Coulaines	4–1 (A)	Fifth Round
Voltigeurs de Châteaubriant	5–1 (a.e.t.) (A)	Sixth Round
Balma	3–0 (A)	Seventh Round
Romorantin	2–1 (H)	Eighth Round
Angoulême CFC	2–1 (a.e.t.) (A)	Round of 64	Rennes	6–1 (A)
Saint-Lô Manche	2–1 (A)	Round of 32	Guingamp	4–2 (H)
Auxerre	3–0 (A)	Round of 16	Sochaux	4–1 (A)
Lens	0–0 (4–2 pen.) (A)	Quarter-finals	Marseille	3–0 (H)
FC Chambly	2–0 (H)	Semi-finals	Caen	3–1 (A)

Note: H = home fixture, A = away fixture

== Match ==
=== Details ===
8 May 2018
21:05 CEST

Les Herbiers VF	0–2	Paris Saint-Germain
	Report	Lo Celso 26'; Cavani 74' (pen.)

Stade de France, Saint-Denis
Attendance: 73,772
Referee: Mikael Lesage

Les Herbiers VF	Paris Saint-Germain

GK	1	(France) Matthieu Pichot	(yellow card) 73'
RB	21	(France) Romuald Marie
CB	2	(France) Diaranké Fofana
CB	26	(France) Guillaume Dequaire
LB	5	(France) Adrien Pagerie
DM	28	(France) Valentin Vanbaleghem		(substituted off) 62'
RM	11	(Cameroon) Rodrigue Bongongui
CM	6	(France) Sébastien Flochon (c)
CM	19	(France) Pierre Germann		(substituted off) 63'
LM	7	(France) Joachim Eickmayer		(substituted off) 88'
CF	18	(France) Kévin Rocheteau
Substitutes:
GK	30	(France) Esteban Salles
DF	23	(France) Franck Héry
MF	4	(France) Florian David
MF	14	(France) Clément Couturier		(substituted on) 88'
FW	10	(Ivory Coast) Ambroise Gboho		(substituted on) 63'
FW	20	(France) Adrian Dabasse		(substituted on) 62'
FW	29	(France) Moulaye Ba
Manager:
(France) Stéphane Masala

GK	1	(Germany) Kevin Trapp
RB	32	(Brazil) Dani Alves		(substituted off) 86'
CB	2	(Brazil) Thiago Silva (c)
CB	5	(Brazil) Marquinhos
LB	17	(Spain) Yuri Berchiche	(yellow card) 15'
CM	18	(Argentina) Giovani Lo Celso
CM	8	(Italy) Thiago Motta		(substituted off) 68'
CM	25	(France) Adrien Rabiot
RF	29	(France) Kylian Mbappé		(substituted off) 86'
CF	9	(Uruguay) Edinson Cavani
LF	11	(Argentina) Ángel Di María
Substitutes:
GK	16	(France) Alphonse Areola
DF	3	(France) Presnel Kimpembe
DF	12	(Belgium) Thomas Meunier		(substituted on) 86'
DF	20	(France) Layvin Kurzawa
MF	19	(France) Lassana Diarra
MF	23	(Germany) Julian Draxler		(substituted on) 68'
MF	27	(Argentina) Javier Pastore		(substituted on) 86'
Manager:
(Spain) Unai Emery

Assistant referees:
Frédéric Hébrard
Huseyin Ocak
Fourth official:
Hakim Ben El Hadj
Video assistant referee:
Benoît Bastien
Assistant video assistant referee:
Jérôme Brisard

Match rules

- 90 minutes.
- 30 minutes of extra time if necessary.
- Penalty shoot-out if scores still level.
- Seven named substitutes, of which up to three may be used.
