= Hugo Cointard =

French footballer (born 1995)

Personal information
- Date of birth: 18 September 1995 (age 31)
- Place of birth: Fontenay-le-Comte, France
- Height: 1.85 m (6 ft 1 in)
- Position: Goalkeeper

Team information
- Current team: Créteil
- Number: 1

Youth career
- 2003–2009: Vendée Fontenay
- 2009–2011: Nantes
- 2011–2013: Tours

Senior career*
Years	Team	Apps	(Gls)
2013–2016	Tours II	23	(0)
2015–2017	Tours	0	(0)
2016–2017	→ Les Herbiers (loan)	0	(0)
2016–2017	→ Les Herbiers II	6	(0)
2018	Chartres	3	(0)
2018	Strumska Slava	16	(0)
2019	Botev Vratsa	1	(0)
2019–2020	Tours	0	(0)
2020–2021	Béziers	0	(0)
2021–2024	Lusitanos Saint-Maur	76	(0)
2024–2025	Saumur	30	(0)
2025–	Créteil	7	(0)
- * Club domestic league appearances and goals as of 13 February 2026

Hugo Cointard (born 18 September 1995) is a French professional footballer who plays as a goalkeeper for Championnat National 1 club Créteil.

== Career ==
Cointard began his football career playing for his hometown club, Vendée Fontenay. He spent six years training at the club before joining professional club Nantes at the age of 14. He then joined Tours in 2011.

After six months without club, Cointard signed a contract with Chartres on 10 January 2018.
