= Adrien Pagerie =

French footballer (born 1992)

Personal information
- Date of birth: 8 May 1992 (age 34)
- Place of birth: Clermont-Ferrand, France
- Height: 1.80 m (5 ft 11 in)
- Position: Left-back

Team information
- Current team: Chambly
- Number: 5

Senior career*
Years	Team	Apps	(Gls)
2012–2014	Clermont B	41	(0)
2014–2015	Clermont	8	(0)
2015–2017	Orléans	36	(0)
2017–2018	Les Herbiers	25	(0)
2018–2019	Villefranche	23	(2)
2019–2020	Cholet	22	(0)
2020–2022	Villefranche	48	(3)
2022–2024	Orléans	16	(0)
2022–2024	Orléans B	8	(0)
2024–	Chambly	9	(0)
- * Club domestic league appearances and goals as of 17 January 2024

Adrien Pagerie (born 8 May 1992) is a French professional footballer who plays as a left back for Championnat National 1 club Chambly.

== Club career ==
A product of the youth system of Clermont Foot, having joined the club in 2012, Pagerie made his senior league debut in a 2–1 Ligue 2 defeat against Brest in August 2014.

In August 2015, Pagerie was signed by US Orléans in an overhaul of the squad following relegation from Ligue 2.

He joined Les Herbiers on 24 June 2017. He played in the 2018 Coupe de France Final whilst at Les Herbiers.

Pagerie played the 2018–19 season with Villefranche in Championnat National, but moved to Cholet in the same division in June 2019, in order to play for promotion. Despite signing a two-and-a-half-year contract with Cholet, he left at the end of the first season, rejoining Villefranche for a second spell in July 2020.

On 21 July 2022, Pagerie returned to Orléans.

== Honours ==
Les Herbiers

- Coupe de France runner-up: 2017–18
