= Pierre Germann =

French footballer (born 1985)

Personal information
- Full name: Pierre-Michel Germann
- Date of birth: March 5, 1985 (age 41)
- Place of birth: Nancy, France
- Height: 1.74 m (5 ft 9 in)
- Position: Midfielder

Team information
- Current team: Luçon

Senior career*
Years	Team	Apps	(Gls)
2003–2007	Dijon	16	(0)
2006–2007	→ Romorantin (loan)	37	(4)
2007–2009	Nîmes	22	(2)
2009–2010	Cherbourg	37	(1)
2010–2016	Luçon	180	(15)
2016–2019	Les Herbiers B	5	(0)
2016–2019	Les Herbiers	58	(2)
2019–2021	La Roche	16	(4)
2021–	Luçon		
- * Club domestic league appearances and goals

Pierre-Michel Germann (born March 5, 1985), known as Pierre Germann, is a French professional footballer who plays as a midfielder for Régional 3 club Luçon. He was a part of the Les Herbiers squad that reached the 2018 Coupe de France final.

== Honours ==
Les Herbiers

- Coupe de France runner-up: 2017–18
