= Diaranké Fofana =

French footballer (born 1989)

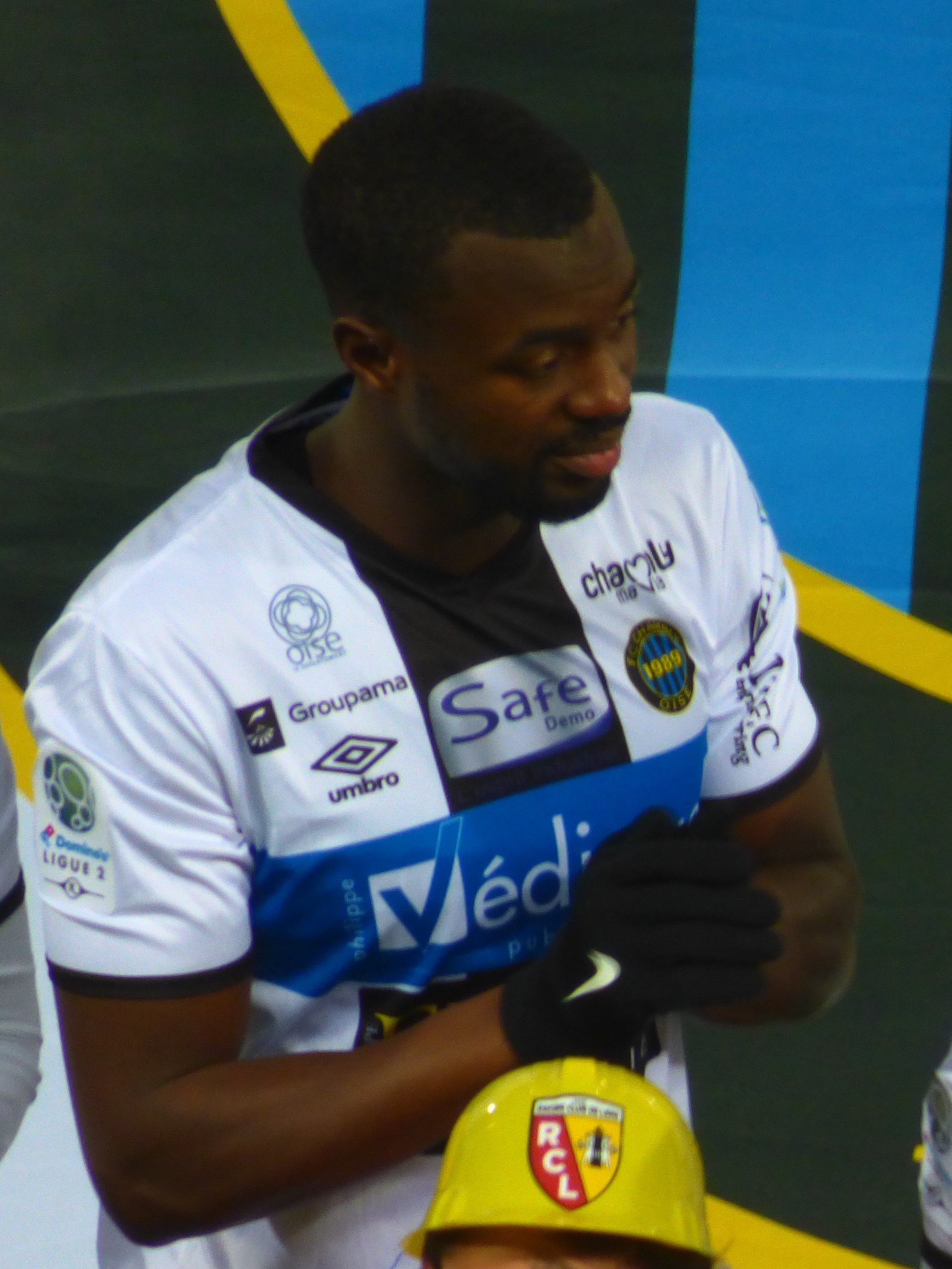
- Fofana with Chambly in 2019

Personal information
- Date of birth: 14 July 1989 (age 37)
- Place of birth: Montreuil, France
- Height: 1.95 m (6 ft 5 in)
- Position: Defender

Youth career
- Creteil

Senior career*
Years	Team	Apps	(Gls)
2010–2011	Creteil II	24	(2)
2011–2012	Corte	8	(1)
2012–2014	Evian II	24	(2)
2014–2015	Universitatea Cluj	0	(0)
2015–2016	Poissy	29	(0)
2016–2018	Athlético Marseille	26	(2)
2018	Les Herbiers	10	(0)
2018–2020	Chambly	30	(0)
2018–2020	Chambly II	4	(0)
2020–2021	Cholet	15	(0)
2021–2022	Sedan	30	(2)
2022–2023	C'Chartres	27	(0)
2023–2024	US Le Pays du Valois	4	(0)
- * Club domestic league appearances and goals

Diaranké Fofana (born 14 July 1989) is a French professional footballer who plays as a defender.

== Career ==
Fofana began his early career with the reserves of Creteil, and had a brief stint in Romania before returning to amateur league in France. In 2018, he joined Chambly and helped them get promoted to Ligue 2. He made his professional debut with Chambly in a 2–0 Coupe de la Ligue loss to Gazélec Ajaccio on 13 August 2019.

In August 2020 he moved to Championnat National side Cholet at the end of his Chambly contract.

On 6 June 2021, Fofana agreed to join Sedan. On 22 July 2022, he moved to C'Chartres.

== Personal life ==
Fofana was born in Montreuil, France. He holds French and Malian nationalities.

== Honours ==
Les Herbiers

- Coupe de France runner-up: 2017–18
