= Matthieu Pichot =

French footballer (born 1989)

Personal information
- Date of birth: 20 September 1989 (age 37)
- Place of birth: Sablé-sur-Sarthe, France
- Height: 1.84 m (6 ft 0 in)
- Position: Goalkeeper

Youth career
- 2006–2009: Laval

Senior career*
Years	Team	Apps	(Gls)
2009–2011	Laval	16	(0)
2011–2012	Les Herbiers	25	(0)
2012–2015	Le Poiré-sur-Vie	98	(0)
2015–2016	CA Bastia	30	(0)
2016–2018	Les Herbiers	56	(0)
2018–2020	Bourg-en-Bresse	59	(0)
2020–2022	Andrézieux	23	(0)
Total		307	(0)
- * Club domestic league appearances and goals

Matthieu Pichot (born 20 September 1989) is a French former professional footballer who played as a goalkeeper.

He played in Ligue 2 for Laval between 2009 and 2011, and later played for Le Poiré-sur-Vie, CA Bastia, Les Herbiers, Bourg-en-Bresse, and Andrézieux.

He was the goalkeeper for Les Herbiers in the 2018 Coupe de France final.\

== Honours ==
Les Herbiers

- Coupe de France runner-up: 2017–18
