= Dani Alves =

Brazilian footballer (born 1983)

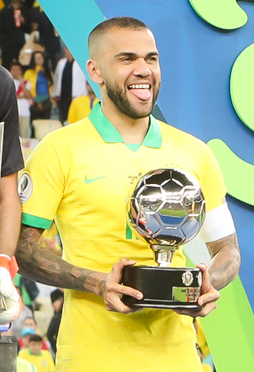
- Alves with Brazil at the 2019 Copa América

Personal information
- Full name: Daniel Alves da Silva
- Date of birth: 6 May 1983 (age 43)
- Place of birth: Juazeiro, Bahia, Brazil
- Height: 1.72 m (5 ft 8 in)
- Position: Right-back

Youth career
- 1996–1998: Juazeiro
- 1998–2001: Bahia

Senior career*
Years	Team	Apps	(Gls)
2001–2003	Bahia	25	(2)
2003–2008	Sevilla	175	(11)
2008–2016	Barcelona	247	(14)
2016–2017	Juventus	19	(2)
2017–2019	Paris Saint-Germain	48	(2)
2019–2021	São Paulo	76	(8)
2021–2022	Barcelona	14	(1)
2022–2023	UNAM	13	(0)
Total		617	(40)

International career
2003	Brazil U20	17	(0)
2021	Brazil Olympic (O.P.)	7	(0)
2006–2022	Brazil	126	(8)
Medal record
Representing Brazil
FIFA Confederations Cup
Winner	2009 South Africa
Winner	2013 Brazil
Copa América
Winner	2007 Venezuela
Winner	2019 Brazil
Olympic Games
Gold medal – first place	2020 Tokyo	Team
FIFA U-20 World Cup
Winner	2003 United Arab Emirates
- * Club domestic league appearances and goals as of 22:11, 8 January 2023 (UTC)

Daniel Alves da Silva (Portuguese: [dɐniˈɛw ˈawviz dɐ ˈsiwvɐ]; born 6 May 1983) is a Brazilian former professional footballer who played as a right-back. He is one of the most decorated players in football history with 43 trophies. In addition, he is one of the few players to have made over 1,050 career appearances.

Starting his career at Bahia in 2001, Alves went on to have a successful six-year spell with Sevilla, winning two UEFA Cups and the Copa del Rey. He joined Barcelona for €32.5 million, becoming the third-most expensive defender of all-time at the time. He won the treble in his first season with the club and in the next season, won the Supercopa de España, UEFA Super Cup and the FIFA Club World Cup. Additionally, he helped the club to clinch another two Supercopa de España, five La Liga titles and two UEFA Champions League titles in the years that followed.

In 2016, Juventus signed Alves on a free transfer. He won the 2016–17 Serie A title and 2016–17 Coppa Italia in his only season with the side, also reaching the Champions League Final. In 2017, Alves joined French side Paris Saint-Germain on a free transfer, winning a domestic treble in his first season, followed by another league title the following season. In 2019, he returned to his home country, joining São Paulo, and winning the 2021 Campeonato Paulista with them. He returned to Barcelona in 2021 for one season, and joined Mexican club UNAM in 2022. UNAM terminated his contract in 2023 after he was charged with sexual assault; his initial conviction was overturned and he was acquitted.

A full international for Brazil from 2006 to 2022, Alves is the nation's third most-capped player of all time. He was included in their squads for three FIFA World Cups and five Copa América tournaments, winning the 2007 and 2019 editions of the latter competition, as well as the 2009 and 2013 FIFA Confederations Cups. At the Summer Olympics in 2020, he won a gold medal. Individually, Alves was named in the IFFHS CONMEBOL Team of the Decade (2011–2020), FIFA Confederations Cup Team of the Tournament (2013), the Copa América Team of the Tournament (2019), and was awarded the Copa América Best Player (2019).

Since January 2026, Alves is co-owner of the Portuguese Liga 3 club São João de Ver.

== Early life ==
Alves was born in Juazeiro, a city in the Brazilian state of Bahia, to father Domingos Alves da Silva, a farmer. He played football with the neighboring kids. Alves' father had a passion for football as well, and eventually managed to organize his own football team. Alves, at age 6, started as a winger, but because of the lack of goals he scored, his father re-positioned him as a right back, a position he still plays up to this day. Alves worked as a farmer and a trader in his youth.

== Club career ==
=== Bahia ===
Alves made his professional debut for Bahia in a match against Paraná Clube for the 2001 Campeonato Brasileiro Série A. Bahia won 3–0, with Alves providing two assists and winning a penalty for the other goal. Head coach Evaristo de Macedo thereafter gave him a starting place in the team. In Bahia, he won the 2002 Copa do Nordeste. His consistently good performances landed him a transfer, at first on loan, to Spanish side Sevilla, midway through 2002.

=== Sevilla ===
After 2002–03, on loan to Sevilla from Bahia, Alves travelled to play in the 2003 FIFA World Youth Championship, where he impressed as Brazil won the tournament. He was named the third-best player of the tournament and, after this, the Sevilla move was made permanent. In June 2006, Sevilla agreed to sell Alves to Liverpool, but Liverpool were unable to match Sevilla's asking price of around £8 million. In December 2006, he signed a new contract with Sevilla, tying him to the club until 2012.

Alves had a successful 2006–07 season, making 47 appearances and scoring 5 goals. He played in every one of Sevilla's UEFA Cup matches, in a competition which the club went on to win. From his years in Spain, Alves acquired Spanish citizenship, thus allowing him to bypass any non-EU quota restrictions and exempting him from needing a work permit to play in any EU countries.

On 1 August 2007, Alves told SporTV he wanted to leave Sevilla for a European giant, later reiterating his desire to leave Sevilla to Marca, saying he was flattered by Chelsea's interest and that he could never turn down such an opportunity. In an interview with Antena 3 on 8 August, Alves confirmed his agent had been in England for some time handling Chelsea's offer, urging Sevilla to at least consider the offer.

On 16 August 2007, Sevilla rejected an unspecified Chelsea bid and, six days later, rejected another two bids from Chelsea, considering them to be "way below what was expected". Alves later revealed his dismay with Sevilla club president José María del Nido for having knocked back Chelsea's offers for his services after his move to Stamford Bridge collapsed, with Chelsea signing fellow Brazilian full back Juliano Belletti for a much lower fee. After a public war of words between Alves and Del Nido, as well as the death of teammate Antonio Puerta, Alves decided to stay with Sevilla, with player and president ostensibly reconciled.

=== Barcelona ===
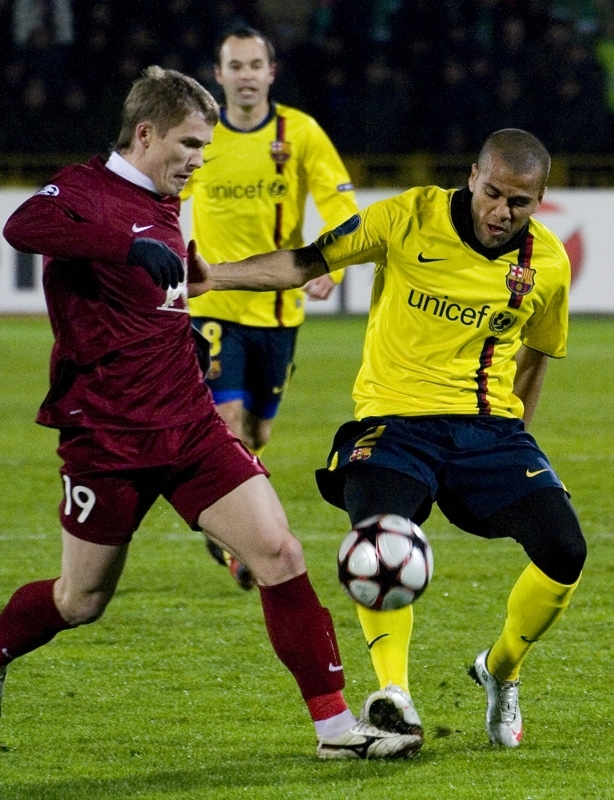
Alves playing against Rubin Kazan in the 2008-09 UEFA Champions League

On 2 July 2008, Alves joined Barcelona, leaving Sevilla in tears and saying he would love to play for the club again. He said he came to Sevilla as a boy and was leaving as a man. The official price of the transfer stood at £23 million up-front, with approximately £7 million more depending on a number of performance-related factors over the next few seasons of Alves' Barcelona career, making him one of the most expensive defenders in history and the third-most expensive player bought by Barça. He signed a four-year contract with Barcelona, which included a buy-out clause of €90 million. Alves made his competitive and European debuts for Barcelona against Wisła Kraków in the 2008–09 UEFA Champions League third-round qualifiers on 13 August 2008. He made his La Liga debut in the Liga season-opener away to Numancia on 31 August 2008. Later on in his debut season, he missed the 2009 UEFA Champions League Final due to a yellow-card suspension, although Barcelona nonetheless defeated Manchester United 2–0 to complete the treble after also winning La Liga and the 2008–09 Copa del Rey.

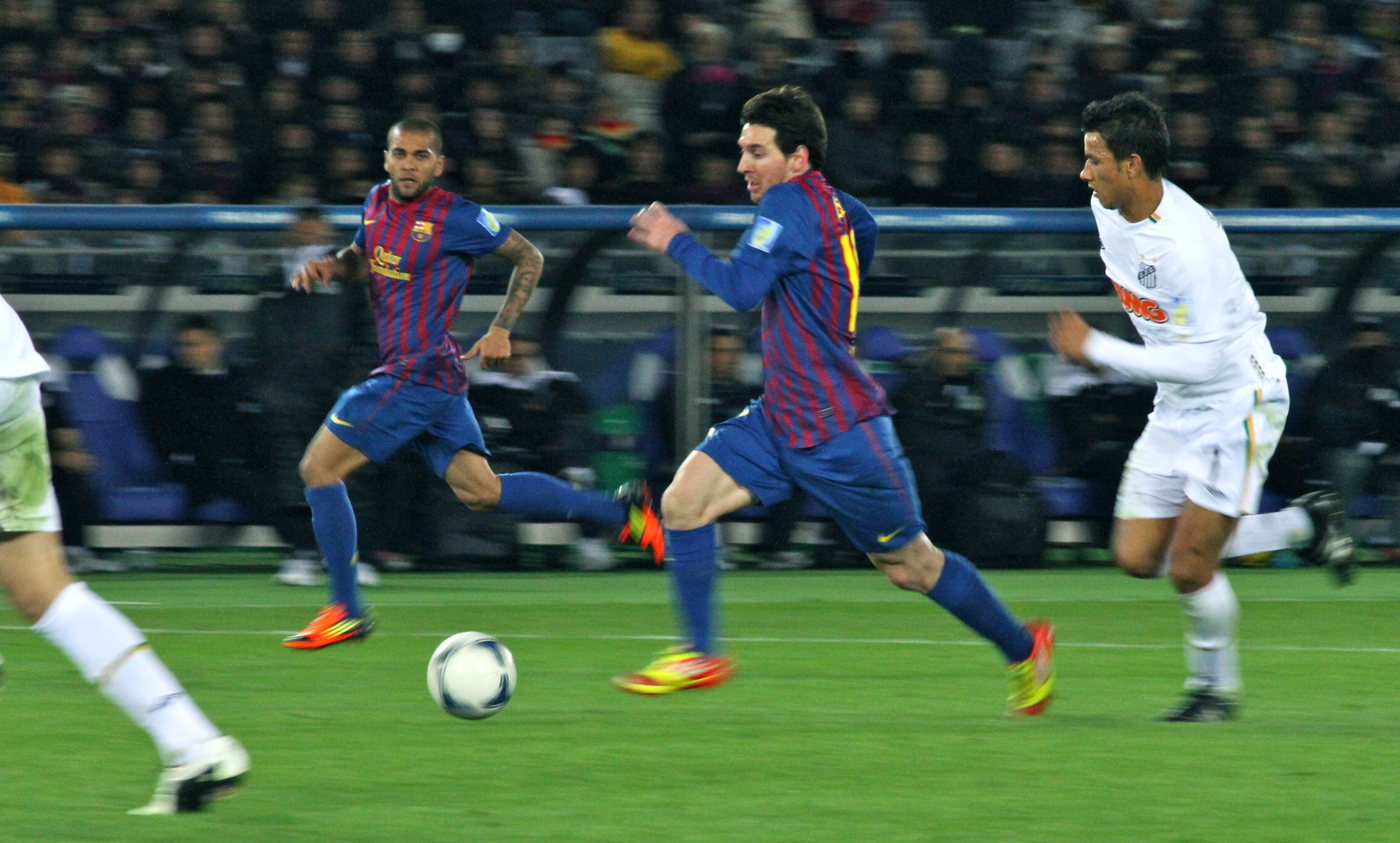
Alves and Lionel Messi during the 2011 FIFA Club World Cup Final

In his second season at Barça, the club retained the Liga title and won the 2009 FIFA Club World Cup. In the 2010–11 season, Alves was instrumental in Barcelona's winning of their third consecutive Liga title. On 28 May 2011, Alves played in his first Champions League final as Barcelona defeated Manchester United 3–1 at Wembley Stadium to win its fourth European Cup. In 2011–12, Alves was part of a Barcelona team that won the Copa del Rey and the Club World Cup. In 2012–13, Alves won the Liga title for the fourth time in his five seasons at Barça. In 2013–14, Alves wore shirt number 22, formerly worn by his friend Eric Abidal, to whom he offered to donate part of his liver during Abidal's treatment for liver cancer.

==== Banana incident ====
On 27 April 2014, during a match at Villarreal's stadium, El Madrigal, Alves was targeted by a Villarreal supporter, who threw a banana at him as a gesture of racial abuse. Alves picked up the banana, peeled it and took a bite. He responded to the incident by saying: "We have suffered this in Spain for some time. You have to take it with a dose of humour. We aren't going to change things easily. If you don't give it importance, they don't achieve their objective." Teammate Neymar's response – to post a photograph of himself on social media also eating a banana – went viral. Other footballers have also since taken photographs of themselves eating bananas. Cyrille Regis, who had been racially abused while a player in the 1970s and 1980s, expressed concern that the viral campaign would detract from the important issues of combating racism in the game. Alves said that whoever threw the banana at him should be publicly shamed, and on 30 April 2014, a man was arrested in connection with the incident. Villarreal were later fined €12,000 for the incident.

==== Third Champions League title ====
On 6 June 2015, Alves started for Barça in the 2015 Champions League final as the club won its fifth European Cup by beating Juventus at the Olympiastadion in Berlin. This made Barcelona the first club in history to win the treble of domestic league, domestic cup and European Cup twice. Alves, Lionel Messi, Andrés Iniesta, Xavi, Gerard Piqué, Pedro and Sergio Busquets are the only players to have been a part of both treble-winning teams. On 9 June 2015, Alves signed a two-year contract with Barcelona, keeping him at the club until 30 June 2017, with the option to extend a further year.

==== Final season ====
After Barcelona were eliminated by compatriots Atlético Madrid in the quarter-finals of the 2015–16 UEFA Champions League, Alves recorded a "bizarre" video in which he impersonated his wife consoling him for the defeat, and posted it on Instagram; manager Luis Enrique subsequently dropped him from the following match against Valencia. On 2 June 2016, Roberto Fernández, Barcelona's technical secretary, announced Alves was leaving Barcelona that summer after eight years. Although under contract until 30 June 2017, Alves contract had a clause allowing him to leave as a free agent.

=== Juventus ===
On 27 June 2016, Juventus announced the signing of Alves on a two-year deal with the option of a third year. He made his Juventus debut on 20 August in a 2–1 home win over Fiorentina in Serie A. On 21 September, Alves scored his first goal with Juventus in a 4–0 home win over Cagliari, before opening his Champions League account with the club against Dinamo Zagreb six days later. On 27 November, he suffered a broken leg in Juventus' 3–1 defeat to Genoa. Alves made his return from injury as a substitute in a 1–0 Derby d'Italia win over Internazionale on 5 February 2017.

On 9 May 2017, Alves scored once and assisted a goal for Mario Mandžukić as Juventus defeated Monaco 2–1 to qualify for the 2017 Champions League final. Six days earlier, Alves had assisted both goals for Gonzalo Higuaín in the first leg of the tie at the Stade Louis II. On 17 May, Alves scored the opening goal of a 2–0 win over Lazio in the 2017 Coppa Italia Final. On 3 June, Alves appeared in his third UEFA Champions League final as Juventus were defeated 4–1 by Real Madrid at the Millennium Stadium in Cardiff. On 29 June 2017, Alves had his contract with Juventus terminated by mutual consent. He made 33 appearances, winning the 2016–17 Serie A title and 2016–17 Coppa Italia in his one season in Turin.

=== Paris Saint-Germain ===
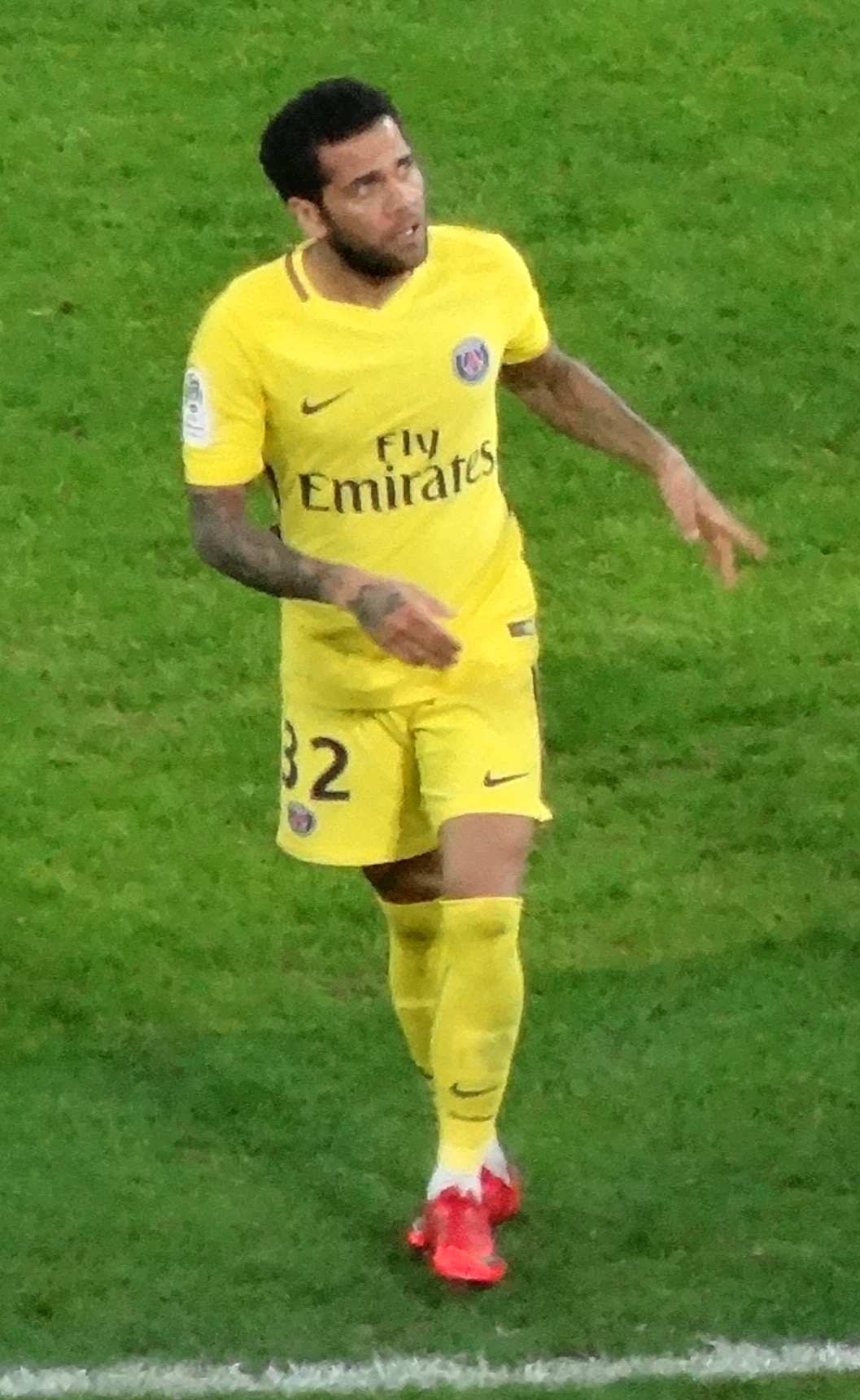
Alves playing for PSG in 2018

On 12 July 2017, Alves joined French side Paris Saint-Germain on a free transfer, signing a two-year contract. He made his debut for the club on 29 July in the 2017 Trophée des Champions, scoring once and assisting the winning goal for Adrien Rabiot in a 2–1 victory over 2016–17 Ligue 1 champions Monaco. On 5 August, Alves assisted Edinson Cavani for PSG's first goal of the 2017–18 Ligue 1 season in a 2–0 win over Amiens at the Parc des Princes.

On 8 May 2018, he started in the 2018 Coupe de France Final, as PSG defeated Les Herbiers VF 2–0 to clinch the 2017–18 Coupe de France title; he came off in the 86th minute for Thomas Meunier, after sustaining an injury. On 28 August 2018, Alves announced through a post on his Instagram page changing his squad number from 32 to 13 in tribute to Brazilian legend and four-time World Cup winner Mário Zagallo. After his contract with the club expired on 30 June 2019, Alves became a free agent.

=== São Paulo ===
On 1 August 2019, São Paulo announced the signing of Dani Alves on a contract that runs until December 2022. A lifelong supporter of São Paulo, Alves had previously on numerous occasions declared his wish of playing for the club. He was received at the Morumbi stadium, in front of 44,000 fans. Idols of the club's recent history, such as Hernanes, Kaká and Luís Fabiano were responsible for welcoming him. Starting his journey in São Paulo FC at Morumbi stadium, Alves commented:

Do not stop believing in your dreams because they are possible. Now, after having gone around the world, it is the first club that I wear the shirt and I am a fan. It is a thrill to receive this mantle, and the moment has come.

Alves received the number 10 shirt upon his arrival. He made his debut on 18 August 2019, scoring the only goal in a 1–0 league win over Ceará at the Morumbi. Despite being a right-back throughout his career, he generally played in central midfield during his time at São Paulo, mainly during Fernando Diniz's tenure between 2019 and 2021. He was also made first team captain at the time of his arrival. In 2021, new manager Hernán Crespo made Alves return to a more defensive role, playing him as a right-sided wingback. At the same time, he gave the captain's armband to Miranda, who was returning to the club after a decade. In May, he won his only title with the club and the 42nd of his career, the Campeonato Paulista, which also ended São Paulo's 8-year trophyless period.

On 10 September 2021, Alves' representatives communicated to São Paulo that he would no longer return to training and subsequently play for the club following a dispute over unpaid image rights. His contract was terminated six days later. São Paulo FC's footballing director Carlos Belmonte stated:

Daniel Alves and Miranda were serving the Brazilian team and should have returned to start regular training for out next games [on Friday]. Miranda attended and trained normally, but Daniel Alves did not attend. We were then informed by his representatives that Daniel Alves will not return to São Paulo until the settlement of the debt that São Paulo has with the athlete. A debt that São Paulo recognises and last week made a proposal seeking the right outcome, which was not accepted by the representatives. From our point of view, we have taken the decision that Daniel Alves will no longer be available to play for São Paulo. São Paulo is more important than all of us.

Since then, São Paulo has agreed, in the same month, to pay Alves R$400,000 monthly over the next 5 years starting from January 2022. This is being done to cover the R$18 million debt at the time of the breakup, owing to the contract agreed in 2019, who São Paulo FC were increasingly unable to pay him then.

=== Return to Barcelona ===
On 12 November 2021, Barcelona announced an agreement in principle to sign Alves on a deal until the end of the season. He only became available for the team's official matches starting January 2022. In December 2021, he made his second debut for the Blaugrana in a friendly, honoring Diego Maradona, match against Boca Juniors, and made his debut in official matches for the Blaugrana on 5 January 2022, in a Copa del Rey 2–1 win over Linares Deportivo. On 6 February 2022, he scored for the first time since returning, in Barça's 4–2 home win over Atlético Madrid in the league; he also provided an assist for Jordi Alba and was sent off for a foul on Yannick Carrasco in the same match. However, he became the oldest player to score for Barcelona in all competitions, aged 38 years and 276 days old, surpassing previous record of Joan Segarra in 1964. On 15 June 2022, Alves announced via a post on his Instagram account that he would leave Barcelona for the second time, having made 408 competitive appearances for the club in total, the second most by a player from abroad, with only Lionel Messi having played more.

=== UNAM ===
On 23 July 2022, Alves signed a one-year contract with Liga MX club UNAM. For the 2022–23 Torneo Clausura, Alves decided to change his shirt number from 33 to 77. On 20 January 2023, following his arrest for sexual assault allegation, UNAM decided to end Alves' contract with the club.

== International career ==
=== Early career and 2007 Copa América title ===
Alves made his Brazil debut as a substitute in an unofficial friendly match against Kuwaiti club Al-Kuwait Selection on 7 October 2006. Three days later, he earned his first international cap in a friendly against Ecuador. He was included in Brazil's team for the 2007 Copa América. He appeared in four matches including the final against Argentina on 15 July, where he gave an assist to Roberto Ayala's own goal and scored a goal himself in the 3–0 victory.

=== 2009 Confederations Cup title, 2010 World Cup, and 2011 Copa América ===
Despite being the most expensive right-back in history at the time, he was initially unable to hold down a regular starting spot in the Brazilian national team, with Maicon being the first choice ahead of him. Alves came on as a substitute in the 2009 FIFA Confederations Cup semi-final against South Africa and scored the winner, a free-kick and a goal in the 88th minute in a 1–0 win. The following summer, he was named to Brazil's squad for the 2010 FIFA World Cup. He scored another long-range free-kick against Iran on 7 October 2010. The following year, Alves was included in Brazil's 23-man squad for the 2011 Copa América in Argentina.

=== 2013 Confederations Cup title and 2014 World Cup ===
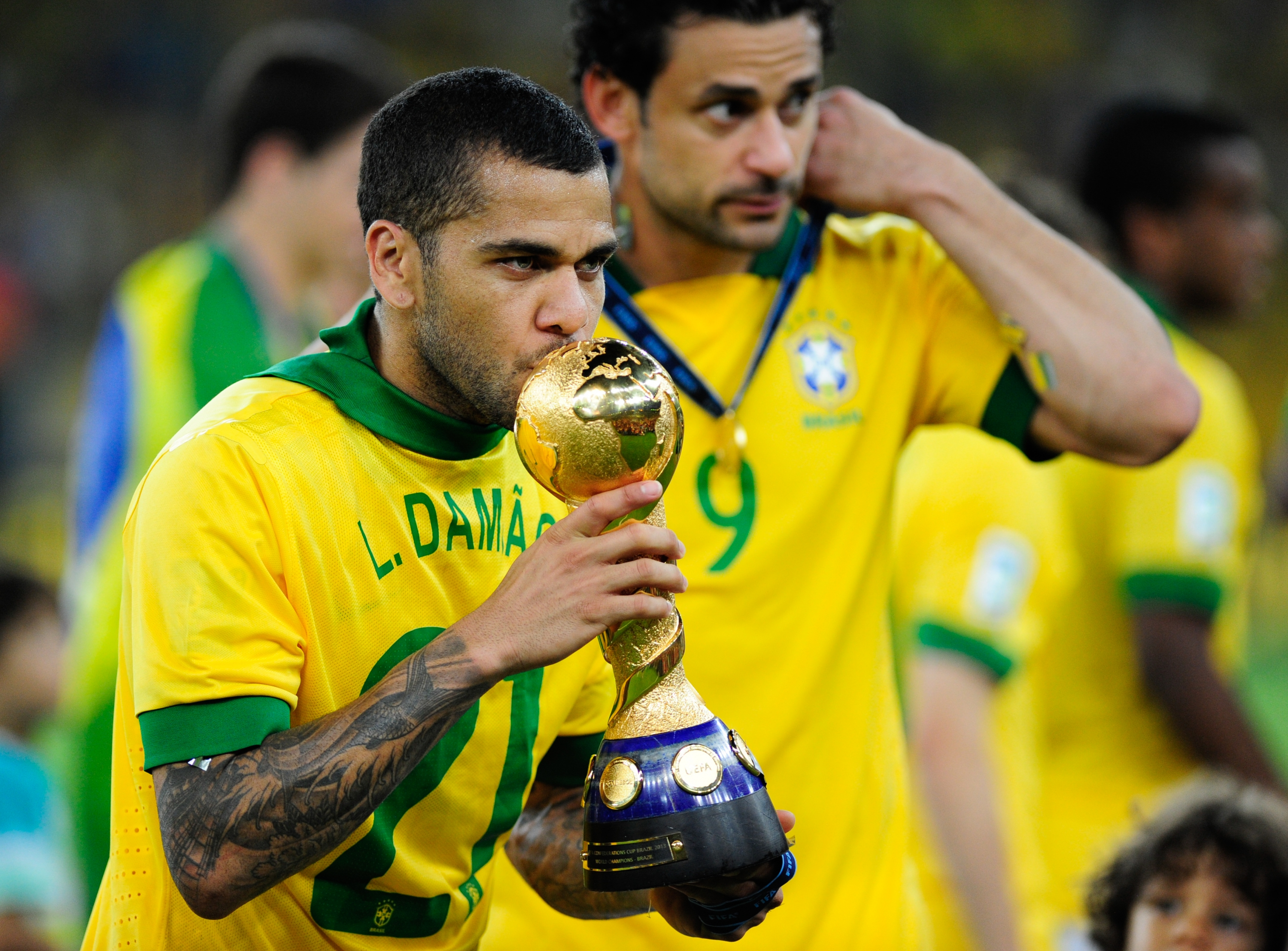
Alves celebrates the win of the 2013 Confederations Cup title

Alves was part of the 23 players called by coach Luiz Felipe Scolari to play in the 2013 FIFA Confederations Cup on home soil. He started in Brazil's 3–0 victory over Spain in the final on 30 June, at the Maracanã Stadium. On 7 May 2014, Alves was named to Brazil's squad for the 2014 FIFA World Cup on home soil. He lost his position as a starter during the competition due to poor performances. After Brazil defeated Colombia 2–1 in the quarter-finals, Alves and teammate David Luiz were applauded for comforting James Rodríguez, an act they were both commended for by both Rodríguez and the media for showing respect.

=== 2015 Copa América, and Copa América Centenario, and 2018 World Cup qualifying ===
Alves was picked as a starter in the 2015 Copa América, as well as the Copa América Centenario tournaments by manager Dunga. He retained his position following the appointment of Tite and helped Brazil secure qualification for the 2018 FIFA World Cup, but was ruled out of the tournament due to a knee injury suffered in the 2018 Coupe de France Final.

=== 2019 Copa América title ===
In May 2019, he was included in Brazil's 23-man squad for the 2019 Copa América on home soil. He went on to replace Neymar as Brazil captain for the tournament. In the team's final group match against Peru in São Paulo on 22 June, Alves scored in a 5–0 win, which saw Brazil advance to the quarter-finals. In the final, on 7 July, at the Maracanã Stadium, Brazil faced Peru once again, and won the match 3–1 to win the title; Alves was subsequently named the Most Valuable Player of the tournament. The 2019 edition of the Copa América was the 40th title of his career.

=== 2020 Summer Olympics ===
On 17 June 2021, Alves was named in the Brazil squad for the 2020 Summer Olympics. In the final, Brazil faced Spain and won the gold medal following a 2–1 victory after an extra time goal by Malcom. At 38, he became the oldest footballer to ever win a medal in the men's Olympic football tournament, and the third oldest player overall behind Ryan Giggs in 2012 and Ricardo Piccinini in 1988.

=== 2022 FIFA World Cup ===
On 7 November 2022, at age 39, Alves was named in the squad for the 2022 FIFA World Cup. By starting in his side's final group stage fixture against Cameroon, Alves became the oldest ever player to feature in a World Cup match for Brazil, at the age of 39 years and 210 days.

== Style of play ==
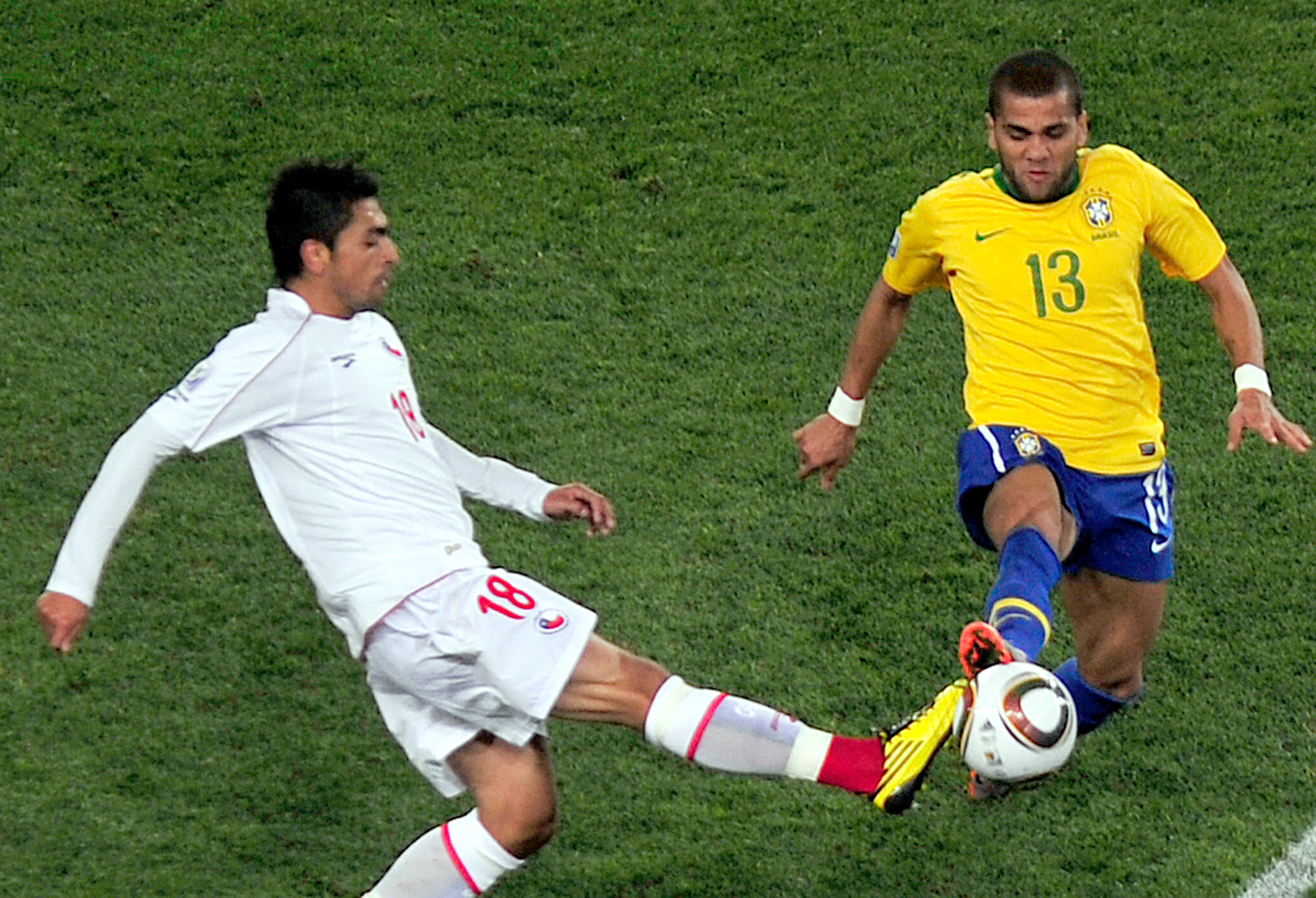
Alves competing for the ball against Chile's Gonzalo Jara at the 2010 FIFA World Cup

Alves is an offensive right-back or wing-back who is known in particular for his pace, stamina, overlapping attacking runs, and technical skills, which also enable him to play in midfield, or as a winger; he is also gifted with good crossing accuracy and distribution, which allows him to link up with midfielders, and makes him an effective assist provider along the right flank. In addition to his ability to create chances, he is an accurate striker of the ball, and is known for his ability to score goals in particular from outside the area or long-range set-pieces. Despite not being particularly imposing physically, he possesses significant strength and tenacity, which along with his energy, anticipation and work-rate, enable him to intercept passes or chase down and press opponents when not in possession, thus allowing him to aid his team both offensively and defensively. However, despite his skill and offensive ability, he has drawn criticism at times in the media for neglecting the defensive aspect of his game.

During his time with Paris Saint-Germain, he also played as a central midfielder on occasion. He continued to play in a free role in midfield during his time with São Paulo, citing his desire to play in the middle in order to have more touches on the ball as the reason for this tactical switch, as out wide he had felt more isolated, and less capable of creating chances for his team. Regarding his unique interpretation of the full-back role throughout his career, Alves commented in 2019:

I'm a full-back who plays a combination game. But here – because of the characteristics of Brazilian football, the way the team plays and, a lot of times, the teammates – you don't have so many [short-passing] combinations. If I play in the position I did for 20 years, I can't interfere as much in the game. When I get involved, I help my teammates to become better. It's been like that my whole career – at Bahia, Sevilla, Barcelona, Juventus and PSG. Those clubs have a history of having done that for a while. Here, the coach changes all the time and you're always trying to adapt to the coach you have. In my position in the middle I'm better for my teammates. I'll be sincere, I created a new way of playing as a full-back. No false modesty. I am always adapting to my teammates. If they're wide, I'll go into the middle. If they're attacking, I'll help with the control. If the ball's on the other side, I tuck in. I play as a creative midfielder from the back. Barcelona gave me this understanding. When I played with Xavi or Rakiti[ć], there was always a player controlling the game. If I was wide, Xavi or Rakiti[ć] were behind me. Seeing them play, I thought: 'When you have a winger who stays wide, you need to stay in the area of control.' At São Paulo, my challenge is to be able to understand my teammates and to combine with them as well as possible.

== Other ventures ==
On 29 September 2011, Alves was appointed as a Special Olympics Ambassador for its Global Football program, charged with promoting respect and inclusion in football for people with intellectual disabilities, particularly in the run up to the 2014 World Cup. On 24 April 2015, Alves publicly expressed his support for the campaign for international recognition of the Armenian genocide. The Embassy of Armenia in Spain would thank Alves the same day, with a comment on its official Facebook account. Alves would apologize to his Turkish fans 3 days later on 27 April 2015, stating: “I’d like to offer my most sincere apologies to all my Turkish fans. I never thought that this photo would cause you any offence, I have a lot of friends …” on his Twitter account.

Along with his ex-teammate turned rapper, José Manuel Pinto, Alves released a song called "Suave" on YouTube on 15 June 2018.

In September 2021, Alves indicated he was a supporter of Jair Bolsonaro after posting slogans in favor of the Brazilian president. That same year, Alves was appointed as an Earthshot Prize council member, an environmental initiative led by Prince William, Duke of Cambridge.

== Personal life ==
Alves is a black Brazilian. He was subjected to racist taunts while playing in Spain.

After Alves was arrested on sexual assault charges, his wife Joana Sanz separated from him in March 2023; she publicly stated that he had caused great emotional hurt to her, and that she wanted to "close this chapter of her life". They later reconciled and welcomed a child together in 2025.

In addition to his native Portuguese, Alves also speaks English and Spanish.

In January 2026, Alves became co-owner of the Portuguese Liga 3 club São João de Ver, and it was reported he is considering signing a six-month contract to play for the club.

=== Legal ===
==== Sexual assault charges, conviction and acquittal ====
On 20 January 2023, Alves was arrested by Catalan police and remanded in custody without bail on charges of sexual assault. The alleged assault occurred at a Barcelona nightclub on 30 December 2022. The complainant had filed an official complaint on 2 January 2023. El Periódico de Catalunya reported that the complainant alleged to police and in court that after a waiter led her to meet Alves at the nightclub's VIP area, Alves twice made her touch his penis against her will, then ordered her to follow him into the nightclub's bathroom, prevented her from leaving the bathroom, threw her onto the ground, slapped her, tried to force her to fellate him, put her against the sink, then moved her to the toilet, raped her and ejaculated. According to El Periódico, semen that matched Alves' DNA was collected from samples from inside the complainant's vagina, from her underwear, from her dress, and from the bathroom floor; the complainant was documented by a hospital to have suffered a knee injury consistent with her allegations; and investigators found seven fingerprints around the bathroom that matched the complainant's account of events, with the complainant giving her account without knowing that investigators had such evidence.

Alves has given at least five different accounts of the incident. El Periódico detailed three versions. In the first version, Alves told media outlet Antena 3 that he did not know the woman, and accused her of trying to become famous by making her allegation. He implied that he entered the bathroom not knowing that she was already inside using it, but this was contradicted by surveillance footage. After understanding that evidence had been collected against him and the above account was part of the evidence, Alves changed his story in court. In the second version, Alves admitted that he had entered the bathroom first before the woman, and that inside the bathroom, he had defecated in the toilet with the woman beside him, and nothing sexual occurred. When Alves was questioned on why the woman would remain in the small bathroom with him for 15 minutes doing nothing, or why his semen had been found on the bathroom floor, Alves changed his story again. In the third version, he said that the woman had performed fellatio on him in the bathroom. On 17 April 2023, Alves testified in court to a different version of events, claiming that he had consensual sexual intercourse with the woman during the incident; Alves also said that he earlier denied the sexual activity because he wanted to save his marriage. By February 2023, at least eight witnesses provided testimony, and it was reported that the crime could receive prosecution through Spain's recently passed 2022 consensual sex law which expanded the legal definition of sexual assault in Spain. In his fifth version, which was detailed by El Periódico on 17 January 2024, Alves claimed he was severely impaired by alcohol consumption.

El Periódico reported in July 2023 that Alves' trial in Spain was originally scheduled to take place between October and November 2023, and no pretrial release should be granted to him until his trial finishes. However, when he was formally indicted on 2 August 2023, it was determined that a trial date would be set for later in the year or early in 2024. He had previously been denied bail in May 2023 and was still in prison by February 2024. On 20 December 2023, a Barcelona-based court scheduled for his trial to begin on 5 February 2024. His trial would then begin on the scheduled date, and it lasted for three days. The trial was also regarded as the first high-profile trial to be held under Spain's 2022 sex crime law.

During the first day of his trial, the presiding Provincial Court of Barcelona rejected Alves' bid to have the trial suspended. The woman who accused Alves of sexually assaulting her provided testimony via a closed-door session, talking from behind a screen and having her voice distorted in order to protect her identity. During the second day of the trial, Alves' wife Joana Sanz was among the witnesses who testified. Catalan News described Sanz as appearing "very cold towards her husband" during the testimony. Friends of Alves who testified claimed they drank alcohol "from lunch until dawn," with Sanz even claiming that Alves appeared "reeking of alcohol" after arriving home. The first two days of the trial saw testimony from the alleged victim, witness, police and experts. The third and final day of the trial saw, among others, Alves himself give testimony, where he again denied raping the accuser and claimed that the encounter between him and his accuser was consensual.

On 22 February 2024, Alves was found guilty of rape, and was sentenced to four and a half years in prison and ordered to pay €150,000 in damages to the victim. Alves' lawyer said that she would appeal against the verdict. After the sentence, Barcelona retired him from the "Legend" section. However, the club would reinstate his likeness on the website days later. On 20 March 2024, Alves was released from jail on a €1,000,000 bail. However, he was ordered to turn his Spanish and Brazilian passports over to the police, effectively prohibiting him from leaving Spain; to appear before a court weekly; and to keep distance from the victim. The ruling which was not unanimous can still be appealed. The victim's lawyer reacted saying "to me, it's a scandal that they let a person who they know can get a million euros in no time walk free." On 28 March 2025, this conviction was overturned by the Spanish court, due to the lack of reliability of the accuser's testimony and inconsistencies in the previous sentence. On 7 May 2025, the Spanish prosecutor's office appealed to the Supreme Court the annulment of the rape conviction of Alves. The prosecution considers that the decision is based on "erroneous" and "even arbitrary" conclusions and that it "morally condemned" the complainant.

==== Tax fraud case ====
On 16 November 2023, Alves won a tax fraud case against him which was related to alleged improper reporting to Spain tax authorities concerning his image rights earnings during the 2009–10 and 2010–11 seasons while he was a Barcelona player after appealing to a Spanish high court. He also received a €3.2 million ($3.4 million) payout from money that was confiscated from him.

== Career statistics ==
=== Club ===
Appearances and goals by club, season and competition
Club	Season	League			National cup (Note: Includes Copa do Brasil, Copa del Rey, Coppa Italia and Coupe de France)		League cup (Note: Includes Coupe de la Ligue)		Continental		Other		Total	
Club	Season	Division	Apps	Goals	Apps	Goals	Apps	Goals	Apps	Goals	Apps	Goals	Apps	Goals
Bahia	2001	Série A	6	0	0	0	—		—		—		6	0
Bahia	2002	Série A	19	2	6	2	—		—		6 (Note: One appearance in Copa dos Campeões, five appearances and one goal in Copa do Nordeste)	1	31	5
Bahia	Total		25	2	6	2	—		—		6	1	37	5
Sevilla	2002–03	La Liga	10	0	1	0	—		—		—		11	0
Sevilla	2003–04	La Liga	29	1	7	1	—		—		—		36	2
Sevilla	2004–05	La Liga	33	2	5	0	—		9 (Note: Appearance(s) in UEFA Cup)	0	—		47	2
Sevilla	2005–06	La Liga	36	3	2	0	—		14	0	—		52	3
Sevilla	2006–07	La Liga	34	3	8	0	—		14	2	1 (Note: Appearance in UEFA Super Cup)	0	57	5
Sevilla	2007–08	La Liga	33	2	3	0	—		8 (Note: Appearance(s) in UEFA Champions League)	2	3 (Note: One appearance in UEFA Super Cup, two appearances in Supercopa de España)	0	47	4
Sevilla	Total		175	11	26	1	—		45	4	4	0	250	16
Barcelona	2008–09	La Liga	34	5	8	0	—		12	0	—		54	5
Barcelona	2009–10	La Liga	29	3	3	0	—		11	0	5 (Note: One appearance in UEFA Super Cup, two appearances in Supercopa de España, two appearances in FIFA Club World Cup)	0	48	3
Barcelona	2010–11	La Liga	35	2	5	0	—		12	2	2 (Note: Appearance(s) in Supercopa de España)	0	54	4
Barcelona	2011–12	La Liga	33	2	5	1	—		10	0	4 (Note: One appearance in UEFA Super Cup, two appearances in Supercopa de España, one appearance in FIFA Club World Cup)	0	52	3
Barcelona	2012–13	La Liga	30	0	6	0	—		10	1	1	0	47	1
Barcelona	2013–14	La Liga	27	2	5	0	—		8	2	2	0	42	4
Barcelona	2014–15	La Liga	30	0	5	0	—		11	0	—		46	0
Barcelona	2015–16	La Liga	29	0	6	1	—		8	0	5 (Note: One appearance in UEFA Super Cup, two appearances in Supercopa de España, two appearances in FIFA Club World Cup)	0	48	1
Barcelona	Total		247	14	43	2	—		82	5	19	0	391	21
Juventus	2016–17	Serie A	19	2	2	1	—		12	3	0	0	33	6
Paris Saint-Germain	2017–18	Ligue 1	25	1	4	0	3	1	8	2	1 (Note: Appearance in Trophée des Champions)	1	41	5
Paris Saint-Germain	2018–19	Ligue 1	23	1	4	2	2	0	3	0	0	0	32	3
Paris Saint-Germain	Total		48	2	8	2	5	1	11	2	1	1	73	8
São Paulo	2019	Série A	20	2	—		—		—		—		20	2
São Paulo	2020	Série A	30	1	6	0	—		6 (Note: Four appearances and one goal in Copa Libertadores, two appearances and one goal and Copa Sudamericana)	2	11 (Note: Appearance(s) in Campeonato Paulista)	4	53	7
São Paulo	2021	Série A	6	0	1	0	—		6 (Note: Appearance(s) in Copa Libertadores)	0	9	1	22	1
São Paulo	Total		56	3	7	0	—		12	2	20	5	95	10
Barcelona	2021–22	La Liga	14	1	2	0	—		0	0	1	0	17	1
UNAM	2022–23	Liga MX	13	0	—		—		—		—		13	0
Career total			597	35	94	8	5	1	162	15	51	7	909	67

=== International ===
Appearances and goals by national team and year
National team	Year	Apps	Goals
Brazil	2006	1	0
Brazil	2007	12	1
Brazil	2008	5	0
Brazil	2009	14	2
Brazil	2010	12	2
Brazil	2011	10	0
Brazil	2012	5	0
Brazil	2013	13	0
Brazil	2014	7	1
Brazil	2015	8	0
Brazil	2016	12	1
Brazil	2017	6	0
Brazil	2018	2	0
Brazil	2019	11	1
Brazil	2020	0	0
Brazil	2021	1	0
Brazil	2022	7	0
Total		126	8

Scores and results list Brazil's goal tally first, score column indicates score after each Alves goal.

List of international goals scored by Dani Alves
No.	Date	Venue	Opponent	Score	Result	Competition	Ref.
1	15 July 2007	Estadio José Pachencho Romero, Maracaibo, Venezuela	Argentina	3–0	3–0	2007 Copa América Final	
2	6 June 2009	Estadio Centenario, Montevideo, Uruguay	Uruguay	1–0	4–0	2010 FIFA World Cup qualification	
3	25 June 2009	Ellis Park Stadium, Johannesburg, South Africa	South Africa	1–0	1–0	2009 FIFA Confederations Cup	
4	7 October 2010	Zayed Sports City Stadium, Abu Dhabi, United Arab Emirates	Iran	1–0	3–0	Friendly	
5	11 October 2010	Pride Park Stadium, Derby, England	Ukraine	1–0	2–0	Friendly	
6	3 June 2014	Estádio Serra Dourada, Goiás, Brazil	Panama	2–0	4–0	Friendly	
7	29 March 2016	Estadio Defensores del Chaco, Asunción, Paraguay	Paraguay	2–2	2–2	2018 FIFA World Cup qualification	
8	22 June 2019	Arena Corinthians, São Paulo, Brazil	Peru	4–0	5–0	2019 Copa América	

== Honours ==
Bahia

- Copa do Nordeste: 2002

Sevilla

- Copa del Rey: 2006–07
- Supercopa de España: 2007
- UEFA Cup: 2005–06, 2006–07
- UEFA Super Cup: 2006

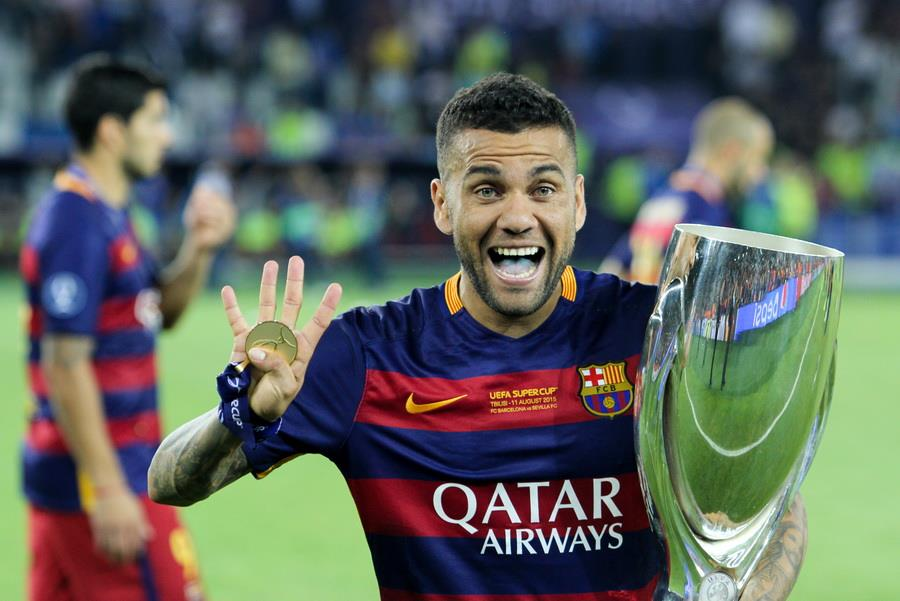
Alves after winning the 2015 UEFA Super Cup

Barcelona

- La Liga: 2008–09, 2009–10, 2010–11, 2012–13, 2014–15, 2015–16
- Copa del Rey: 2008–09, 2011–12, 2014–15, 2015–16
- Supercopa de España: 2009, 2010, 2011, 2013
- UEFA Champions League: 2008–09, 2010–11, 2014–15
- UEFA Super Cup: 2009, 2011, 2015
- FIFA Club World Cup: 2009, 2011, 2015

Juventus

- Serie A: 2016–17
- Coppa Italia: 2016–17

Paris Saint-Germain

- Ligue 1: 2017–18, 2018–19
- Coupe de France: 2017–18; runner-up: 2018–19
- Coupe de la Ligue: 2017–18
- Trophée des Champions: 2017

São Paulo

- Campeonato Paulista: 2021

Brazil U20

- FIFA World Youth Championship: 2003

Brazil Olympic

- Summer Olympics: 2020

Brazil

- Copa América: 2007, 2019
- FIFA Confederations Cup: 2009, 2013

Individual

- FIFA U-20 World Cup Bronze Ball: 2003
- UEFA Cup Most Valuable Player: 2005–06
- UEFA Team of the Year: 2007, 2009, 2011, 2015, 2017
- ESM Team of the Year: 2006–07, 2008–09, 2009–10, 2010–11, 2011–12
- FIFA FIFPro World11: 2009, 2011, 2012, 2013, 2015, 2016, 2017, 2018
- La Liga Defender of the Season: 2008–09
- FIFA Confederations Cup Team of the Tournament: 2013
- La Liga Team of the Season: 2014–15
- France Football World XI: 2015
- Serie A Team of the Year: 2016–17
- IFFHS Men's World Team: 2017
- UNFP Ligue 1 Team of the Year: 2017–18
- Copa América Golden Ball: 2019
- Copa América Team of the Tournament: 2019
- IFFHS CONMEBOL Team of the Decade: 2011–2020
- Campeonato Paulista Team of the Tournament: 2020

== See also ==
- List of footballers with 100 or more UEFA Champions League appearances
- List of men's footballers with 100 or more international caps
- List of men's footballers with the most official appearances
- List of FC Barcelona players (100+ appearances)
- List of La Liga players (400+ appearances)
- List of world association football records
