= 2019–20 Ligue 1 =

82nd season of top-tier French football

Ligue 1
- Season: 2019–20
- Dates: 9 August 2019 – 28 April 2020
- Champions: Paris Saint-Germain; 9th Ligue 1 title 9th French title
- Relegated: Amiens; Toulouse
- Champions League: Paris Saint-Germain; Marseille; Rennes
- Europa League: Lille; Nice; Reims
- Matches: 279
- Goals: 704 (2.52 per match)
- Top goalscorer: Wissam Ben Yedder; Kylian Mbappé (18 goals each)
- Biggest home win: Lyon 6–0 Angers (16 August 2019); Bordeaux 6–0 Nîmes (3 December 2019)
- Biggest away win: Amiens 0–4 Strasbourg (23 November 2019); Nîmes 0–4 Lyon (6 December 2019); Saint-Étienne 0–4 Paris Saint-Germain (15 December 2019)
- Highest scoring: Amiens 4–4 Paris Saint-Germain (15 February 2020)
- Longest winning run: Marseille; Paris Saint-Germain (6 matches)
- Longest unbeaten run: Paris Saint-Germain (15 matches)
- Longest winless run: Toulouse (18 matches)
- Longest losing run: Toulouse (11 matches)
- Highest attendance: 65,421; Marseille 2–1 Lyon (10 November 2019)
- Lowest attendance: 3,585; Monaco 1–0 Angers (4 February 2020)
- Total attendance: 6,244,914
- Average attendance: 22,463

The 2019–20 Ligue 1 season, also known as Ligue 1 Conforama for sponsorship reasons, was a French association football tournament within Ligue 1. It was the 82nd season since its establishment. The season began on 9 August 2019 and ended abruptly on 28 April 2020.

On 13 March 2020, the LFP suspended Ligue 1 and Ligue 2 indefinitely following the outbreak of COVID-19 in France. On 28 April 2020, it was announced that Ligue 1 and Ligue 2 campaigns would not resume, after the country banned all sporting events until September. On 30 April 2020, Paris Saint-Germain were awarded the championship following the cancellation of the 2019–20 season.

PSG topped the standings by 12 points with a game in hand at the time the league was halted. Marseille and Rennes were awarded the other two UEFA Champions League spots based on their rankings at the league's suspension. On 9 June 2020, France's highest administrative court ruled that relegation for Amiens and Toulouse was suspended for this season. This was overruled on 23 June and subsequently Amiens and Toulouse were relegated to the 2020–21 Ligue 2.

== Teams ==
=== Changes ===
Metz and Brest were promoted from the 2018–19 Ligue 2, replacing the two relegated teams from the 2018–19 Ligue 1, Caen and Guingamp.

=== Stadium and locations ===
Location of teams in 2019–20 Ligue 1

Club	Location	Venue	Capacity	2018–19 season
Amiens	Amiens	Stade de la Licorne	12,097	15th
Angers	Angers	Stade Raymond Kopa	18,752	13th
Bordeaux	Bordeaux	Matmut Atlantique	42,115	14th
Brest	Brest	Stade Francis-Le Blé	15,931	Ligue 2, 2nd
Dijon	Dijon	Stade Gaston Gérard	15,995	18th
Lille	Villeneuve-d'Ascq	Stade Pierre-Mauroy	50,186	2nd
Lyon	Lyon	Groupama Stadium	59,186	3rd
Marseille	Marseille	Orange Vélodrome	67,394	5th
Metz	Metz	Stade Saint-Symphorien	25,636	Ligue 2, 1st
Monaco	Monaco	Stade Louis II	18,523	17th
Montpellier	Montpellier	Stade de la Mosson	32,900	6th
Nantes	Nantes	Stade de la Beaujoire	35,322	12th
Nice	Nice	Allianz Riviera	35,624	7th
Nîmes	Nîmes	Stade des Costières	18,482	9th
Paris Saint-Germain	Paris	Parc des Princes	48,583	1st
Reims	Reims	Stade Auguste Delaune	21,684	8th
Rennes	Rennes	Roazhon Park	29,778	10th
Saint-Étienne	Saint-Étienne	Stade Geoffroy-Guichard	41,965	4th
Strasbourg	Strasbourg	Stade de la Meinau	29,230	11th
Toulouse	Toulouse	Stadium Municipal	33,150	16th

=== Personnel and kits ===
Team	Manager	Captain	Kit manufacturer	Shirt sponsor (front)	Shirt sponsor (back)	Shirt sponsor (sleeve)	Shorts sponsor	Socks sponsor
Amiens	(Slovenia) Luka Elsner	(France) Prince-Désir Gouano	(Germany) Puma	Intersport, IGOL Lubrifiants, Teddy Smith	IGOL Lubrifiants	None	Winamax, E.Leclerc	None
Angers	(France) Stéphane Moulin	(Ivory Coast) Ismaël Traoré	(Italy) Kappa	Scania (H)/Le Gaulois (A & 3), L'Atoll Angers, Brioche Pasquier, Actual Leader, Angers	SOS Malus	P2i	Système U	None
Bordeaux	(Portugal) Paulo Sousa	(France) Benoît Costil	(Germany) Puma	Bistro Régent, Intersport	Betclic	Wiśniowski	None	None
Brest	(France) Olivier Dall'Oglio	(France) Gaëtan Belaud	(United States) Nike	Groupe Quéguiner (H)/Yaourts Malo (A & 3), SILL (H)/Groupe Quéguiner (A & 3), Breizh Cola, GUYOT Environnement, Oceania Hotels	Groupe Océanic	None	E.Leclerc, E.Leclerc Drive	BSP Securité
Dijon	(France) Stéphane Jobard	(Cape Verde) Júlio Tavares	(Italy) Lotto	Groupe Roger Martin, DVF Group, Suez	DORAS	Leader Interim, Auteur des Williams, Coup d'Pouce	LCR, Dalkia	Caisse d'Épargne
Lille	(France) Christophe Galtier	(Portugal) José Fonte	(United States) New Balance	Boulanger, Comarch, Métropole Européenne de Lille (H)/Hello Lille (A & 3)	Flunch	Midas Trend	Winamax	None
Lyon	(France) Rudi Garcia	(Netherlands) Memphis Depay	(Germany) Adidas	Hyundai/Veolia (only in UEFA matches), Groupama, MDA Electroménager/Pulsat	Deliveroo, Groupe ALILA	Adéquat Intérim	Teddy Smith	None
Marseille	(Portugal) André Villas-Boas	(France) Steve Mandanda	(Germany) Puma	Uber Eats	Boulanger	Iqoniq	Hotels.com	None
Metz	(France) Vincent Hognon	(France) Renaud Cohade	(United States) Nike	Car Avenue, MOSL, Blue Habitat, Axia Interim	Nacon Gaming (H), Forcepower (A & 3)	Eurométropole de Metz	E.Leclerc Moselle	None
Monaco	(Spain) Robert Moreno	(Poland) Kamil Glik	(Italy) Kappa	Fedcom	Alain Afflelou	Triangle Intérim	Orezza	None
Montpellier	(Armenia) Michel Der Zakarian	(Brazil) Vitorino Hilton	(United States) Nike	Pasinobet, FAUN-Environnement, Montpellier Métropole, Groupama	Sud de France	NG Promotion	Système U, Groupe Ilios	None
Nantes	(France) Christian Gourcuff	(France) Abdoulaye Toure	(United States) New Balance	Synergie, Manitou, Proginov	Groupe Millet	LNA Santé	Maisons Pierre, Flamino	None
Nice	(France) Patrick Vieira	(Brazil) Dante	(Italy) Macron	Ineos, Ville de Nice, Métropole Nice Côte d'Azur	Groupe Actual	None	Winamax	None
Nîmes	(France) Bernard Blaquart	(France) Anthony Briançon	(Germany) Puma	Hectare Amenageur Lotisseur, Nîmes	Nîmes Métropole	La Région Occitanie	None	None
Paris Saint-Germain	(Germany) Thomas Tuchel	(Brazil) Thiago Silva	(United States) Nike (H)/Air Jordan (A & T)	Accor Live Limitless	Ooredoo	QNB	None	None
Reims	(France) David Guion	(Togo) Alaixys Romao	(England) Umbro	Maisons France Confort (H)/Hexaom (A & 3), Transports Caillot, EVA Air	Hyper U Reims Village	Triangle Intérim, Grand Reims (H), Reims (A & 3)	Crédit Agricole Nord-Est	None
Rennes	(France) Julien Stephan	(France) Damien da Silva	(Germany) Puma	Samsic, Del Arte, Groupe Launay, Association ELA	Blot Immobilier	rennes.fr	Convivio	None
Saint-Étienne	(France) Claude Puel	(France) Loïc Perrin	(France) Le Coq Sportif	AÉSIO, Loire, Groupe BYmyCAR, Groupe Atrium	Alain Afflelou	MARKAL	Desjoyaux Piscines	None
Strasbourg	(France) Thierry Laurey	(Serbia) Stefan Mitrović	(Germany) Adidas	ÉS Énergies (H)/CroisiEurope (A)/Hager (in UEFA matches), Hager (H), Pierre Schmidt (H)/Stoeffler (A)	CroisiEurope (H)/ÉS Énergies (A)	Würth	Eurométropole de Strasbourg, LCR	None
Toulouse	(France) Denis Zanko	(Ivory Coast) Max Gradel	(Spain) Joma	Triangle Intérim, LP Promotion	Newrest	None	Mairie de Toulouse, Conseil départemental de la Haute-Garonne	None

=== Managerial changes ===
Team	Outgoing manager	Manner of departure	Date of vacancy	Position in table	Incoming manager	Date of appointment
Brest	(France) Jean-Marc Furlan	End of contract	17 May 2019	Pre-season	(France) Olivier Dall'Oglio	26 May 2019
Metz	(France) Frédéric Antonetti	Resigned for personal reasons	18 May 2019	Pre-season	(France) Vincent Hognon	18 May 2019
Lyon	(France) Bruno Génésio	End of contract	25 May 2019	Pre-season	(Brazil) Sylvinho	25 May 2019
Saint-Étienne	(France) Jean-Louis Gasset	End of contract	25 May 2019	Pre-season	(France) Ghislain Printant	25 May 2019
Marseille	(France) Rudi Garcia	Resigned	25 May 2019	Pre-season	(Portugal) André Villas-Boas	28 May 2019
Amiens	(France) Christophe Pélissier	Signed by Lorient	29 May 2019	Pre-season	(Slovenia) Luka Elsner	19 June 2019
Dijon	(France) Antoine Kombouaré	Resigned	10 June 2019	Pre-season	(France) Stéphane Jobard	20 June 2019
Nantes	(Bosnia and Herzegovina) Vahid Halilhodžić	Mutual consent	2 August 2019	Pre-season	(France) Christian Gourcuff	8 August 2019
Saint-Étienne	(France) Ghislain Printant	Sacked	4 October 2019	19th	(France) Claude Puel	4 October 2019
Lyon	(Brazil) Sylvinho	Sacked	7 October 2019	14th	(France) Rudi Garcia	14 October 2019
Toulouse	(France) Alain Casanova	Mutual consent	10 October 2019	18th	(France) Antoine Kombouaré	14 October 2019
Monaco	(Portugal) Leonardo Jardim	Sacked	28 December 2019	7th	(Spain) Robert Moreno	28 December 2019
Toulouse	(France) Antoine Kombouaré	Sacked	5 January 2020	20th	(France) Denis Zanko	6 January 2020

== League table ==
Pos	Team	Pld	W	D	L	GF	GA	GD	Pts	PPG	Qualification or relegation
1	Paris Saint-Germain (C)	27	22	2	3	75	24	+51	68	2.52	Qualification for the Champions League group stage
2	Marseille	28	16	8	4	41	29	+12	56	2.00	Qualification for the Champions League group stage
3	Rennes	28	15	5	8	38	24	+14	50	1.79	Qualification for the Champions League group stage
4	Lille	28	15	4	9	35	27	+8	49	1.75	Qualification for the Europa League group stage (Note: Since the winners of the Coupe de France and the Coupe de la Ligue, Paris Saint-Germain, qualified for the Champions League, the spot given to the Coupe de France winners (Europa League group stage) was passed to the fifth-placed team and the spot given to the Coupe de la Ligue winners (Europa League second qualifying round) was passed to the sixth-placed team.)
5	Nice	28	11	8	9	41	38	+3	41 (Note: Nice finished ahead of Reims on head-to-head points: Nice 2–0 Reims, Reims 1–1 Nice.)	1.46	Qualification for the Europa League group stage
6	Reims	28	10	11	7	26	21	+5	41	1.46	Qualification for the Europa League second qualifying round
7	Lyon	28	11	7	10	42	27	+15	40	1.43	
8	Montpellier	28	11	7	10	35	34	+1	40	1.43	
9	Monaco	28	11	7	10	44	44	0	40	1.43	
10	Strasbourg	27	11	5	11	32	32	0	38	1.41	
11	Angers	28	11	6	11	28	33	−5	39	1.39	
12	Bordeaux	28	9	10	9	40	34	+6	37 (Note: Bordeaux finished ahead of Nantes on head-to-head points: Bordeaux 2–0 Nantes, Nantes 0–1 Bordeaux.)	1.32	
13	Nantes	28	11	4	13	28	31	−3	37	1.32	
14	Brest	28	8	10	10	34	37	−3	34	1.21	
15	Metz	28	8	10	10	27	35	−8	34	1.21	
16	Dijon	28	7	9	12	27	37	−10	30	1.07	
17	Saint-Étienne	28	8	6	14	29	45	−16	30	1.07	
18	Nîmes (Note: Originally, the 18th-placed Ligue 1 team would play in promotion-relegation play-offs at the end of the season with a team from Ligue 2 to decide whether they would remain in Ligue 1 for the 2020–21 season, but the play-offs were cancelled and the 18th-placed team remained in Ligue 1.)	28	7	6	15	29	44	−15	27	0.96	
19	Amiens (R)	28	4	11	13	31	50	−19	23	0.82	Relegation to Ligue 2
20	Toulouse (R)	28	3	4	21	22	58	−36	13	0.46	Relegation to Ligue 2

Source: Ligue 1
Rules for classification: 1) Points per game; 2) Head-to-head points; 3) Head-to-head goal difference; 4) Goal difference; 5) Goals scored; 6) Fairplay ranking.
(C) Champions; (R) Relegated

== Results ==
Home \ Away	AMI	ANG	BOR	BRE	DIJ	LIL	OL	OM	MET	ASM	MON	FCN	NIC	NMS	PSG	REI	REN	STE	STR	TFC
Amiens	—	—	1–3	1–0	1–1	1–0	2–2	3–1	0–1	1–2	1–2	1–2	—	—	4–4	1–1	—	—	0–4	0–0
Angers	1–1	—	3–1	0–1	2–0	0–2	—	0–2	3–0	0–0	1–0	2–0	1–1	1–0	—	1–4	—	4–1	1–0	—
Bordeaux	—	—	—	2–2	2–2	—	1–2	0–0	2–0	2–1	1–1	2–0	1–1	6–0	0–1	—	—	0–1	0–1	—
Brest	2–1	0–1	1–1	—	2–0	—	2–2	—	2–0	—	—	1–1	0–0	—	1–2	1–0	0–0	3–2	5–0	1–1
Dijon	—	—	0–2	3–0	—	1–0	—	0–0	2–2	1–1	2–2	3–3	—	0–0	2–1	—	2–1	1–2	1–0	2–1
Lille	—	2–1	3–0	1–0	1–0	—	1–0	1–2	0–0	—	2–1	2–1	—	2–2	0–2	—	1–0	3–0	2–0	3–0
Lyon	0–0	6–0	1–1	—	0–0	0–1	—	—	2–0	—	—	0–1	2–1	—	0–1	—	0–1	2–0	1–1	3–0
Marseille	2–2	0–0	3–1	2–1	—	2–1	2–1	—	—	—	1–1	1–3	—	3–1	—	0–2	1–1	1–0	2–0	1–0
Metz	1–2	—	1–2	—	—	—	0–2	1–1	—	3–0	2–2	1–0	—	2–1	0–2	1–1	0–1	3–1	1–0	2–2
Monaco	3–0	1–0	—	4–1	1–0	5–1	0–3	3–4	—	—	1–0	—	3–1	2–2	1–4	1–1	3–2	—	1–3	—
Montpellier	4–2	0–0	—	4–0	2–1	—	1–0	—	1–1	3–1	—	—	2–1	1–0	1–3	—	0–1	1–0	3–0	3–0
Nantes	—	1–2	0–1	—	1–0	0–1	—	0–0	0–0	0–1	1–0	—	1–0	—	1–2	1–0	1–0	2–3	—	2–1
Nice	2–1	3–1	1–1	2–2	2–1	1–1	2–1	1–2	4–1	2–1	—	—	—	1–3	1–4	2–0	1–1	—	—	3–0
Nîmes	1–1	1–0	—	3–0	2–0	—	0–4	2–3	1–1	3–1	—	0–1	1–2	—	—	2–0	0–1	0–1	—	1–0
Paris SG	4–1	4–0	4–3	—	4–0	2–0	4–2	4–0	—	3–3	5–0	2–0	—	3–0	—	0–2	—	—	1–0	4–0
Reims	—	0–0	1–1	1–0	1–2	2–0	1–1	—	0–1	0–0	1–0	—	1–1	0–0	—	—	1–0	3–1	0–0	—
Rennes	3–1	2–1	1–0	0–0	—	1–1	—	0–1	—	—	5–0	3–2	1–2	2–1	2–1	0–1	—	2–1	—	3–2
Saint-Étienne	2–2	—	1–1	1–1	—	—	1–0	0–2	0–1	1–0	0–0	0–2	4–1	2–1	0–4	1–1	—	—	—	2–2
Strasbourg	0–0	—	—	—	—	1–2	1–2	—	1–1	2–2	1–0	2–1	1–0	4–1	—	3–0	0–2	2–1	—	4–2
Toulouse	2–0	0–2	1–3	2–5	1–0	2–1	2–3	0–2	—	1–2	—	—	0–2	—	—	0–1	0–2	—	0–1	—

Source: Ligue 1
Legend: Blue = home team win; Yellow = draw; Red = away team win.
For upcoming matches, an "a" indicates there is an article about the rivalry between the two participants.

== Season statistics ==
=== Top goalscorers ===
Rank	Player	Club	Goals
1	(France) Wissam Ben Yedder	Monaco	18
1	(France) Kylian Mbappé	Paris Saint-Germain	18
3	(France) Moussa Dembélé	Lyon	16
4	(Brazil) Neymar	Paris Saint-Germain	13
4	(Nigeria) Victor Osimhen	Lille	13
6	(Senegal) Habib Diallo	Metz	12
6	(Argentina) Mauro Icardi	Paris Saint-Germain	12
8	(Argentina) Darío Benedetto	Marseille	11
8	(Denmark) Kasper Dolberg	Nice	11
10	(Gabon) Denis Bouanga	Saint-Étienne	10
10	(Senegal) M'Baye Niang	Rennes	10

=== Clean sheets ===
Rank	Player	Club	Clean sheets
1	(France) Mike Maignan	Lille	12
1	(France) Steve Mandanda	Marseille	12
1	(Serbia) Predrag Rajković	Reims	12
4	(France) Ludovic Butelle	Angers	11
4	(Costa Rica) Keylor Navas	Paris Saint-Germain	11
6	(France) Alban Lafont	Nantes	10
7	(Senegal) Édouard Mendy	Rennes	9
8	(Portugal) Anthony Lopes	Lyon	8
8	(Algeria) Alexandre Oukidja	Metz	8
8	(Argentina) Gerónimo Rulli	Montpellier	8
8	(Belgium) Matz Sels	Strasbourg	8

=== Hat-tricks ===
Player	Club	Against	Result	Date
(Chad) Casimir Ninga	Angers	Saint-Étienne	4–1 (H)	22 September 2019
(Italy) Cristian Battocchio	Brest	Strasbourg	5–0 (H)	3 December 2019
(Nigeria) Josh Maja	Bordeaux	Nîmes	6–0 (H)	3 December 2019
(Argentina) Darío Benedetto	Marseille	Nîmes	3–2 (A)	28 February 2020
