= Alexandre Tégar =

Guadeloupean footballer (born 2000)

Personal information
- Date of birth: 12 August 2000 (age 26)
- Place of birth: Les Abymes, Guadeloupe, France
- Height: 1.80 m (5 ft 11 in)
- Position: Left-back

Team information
- Current team: Les Herbiers
- Number: 15

Youth career
- –2019: Dijon

Senior career*
Years	Team	Apps	(Gls)
2018–2021	Dijon B	30	(1)
2021–2023	Quevilly-Rouen	5	(0)
2021–2023	Quevilly-Rouen B	35	(0)
2023	Paris 13 Atletico	10	(1)
2023–	Les Herbiers	41	(0)
- * Club domestic league appearances and goals as of 4 December 2025

Alexandre Tégar (born 12 August 2000) is a Guadeloupean professional footballer who plays as a left-back for Championnat National 1 club Les Herbiers.

== Honours ==
Dijon B

- Championnat National 3: 2018–19
