= Stéphane Masala =

French football manager (born 1976)

Personal information
- Date of birth: 30 August 1976 (age 50)
- Place of birth: Nantes, France
- Height: 1.76 m (5 ft 9 in)
- Position: Midfielder

Team information
- Current team: Chambly (manager)

Senior career*
| Years | Team | Apps | (Gls) |
| 1995–1998 | Troyes B | | |
| 1998–2001 | Reims | | |
| 2001–2003 | Châlons | | |
| 2003–2005 | Orléans | | |
| 2005–2014 | Luçon | | |

Managerial career
- 2014–2016: Luçon
- 2016–2018: Les Herbiers (assistant)
- 2018–2022: Les Herbiers
- 2022–2023: Créteil
- 2023–: Chambly
- * Club domestic league appearances and goals

Stéphane Masala (born 30 August 1976) is a French professional football manager and former player. He is currently the manager of Championnat National 1 club Chambly.

In 2018, Masala coached Les Herbiers, a third-tier side, to the Coupe de France final, eventually being defeated 2–0 by first-tier giants Paris Saint-Germain.

== Playing career ==
Masala played mainly as a midfielder throughout his 19-year playing career. From 2003 to 2005, he was the captain of Orléans, and also coached one of the club's youth teams. He later played for three different seasons with Reims and Luçon in the third tier of French football, the Championnat National, but never obtained professional status as a player. In the final years of his playing days, he was simultaneously the captain and assistant manager of Luçon, with Frédéric Reculeau being the main manager. Masala retired in 2014.

== Managerial career ==
In June 2016, after spending 11 years as a coach and a player at Luçon, Masala became the assistant manager of Les Herbiers. He took the full job of manager at the club in January 2018, after his previous colleague Reculeau had been dismissed. Initially, he was intended to be the interim manager for just two games, but his contract was later extended. In his first two months in charge, Les Herbiers won seven and drew four of their twelve matches. Masala did not have the correct coaching qualifications to manage in the Championnat National, and so Les Herbiers were fined €1,170 for every match in 2018 that he managed.

Masala coached Les Herbiers to a Coupe de France final against Paris Saint-Germain in 2018, an underdog story that ended in a 2–0 defeat at the Stade de France. They played and defeated Chambly in the semi-finals of the competition. A few days after the Coupe de France Final, Les Herbiers were relegated from the Championnat National to the Championnat National 2. On 8 May 2020, Masala extended his contract with Les Herbiers for an additional two years.

In May 2022, Masala left Les Herbiers after six years at the club, joining Championnat National 2 side Créteil. In June 2023, he joined Chambly.

== Personal life ==
Masala was born in Nantes, France. He is of Sardinian and Italian descent; his father left Sardinia when he was 16, and his mother is from Marche, Italy.

== Honours ==
=== Player ===
Luçon

- Championnat de France Amateur: 2012–13

=== Manager ===
Les Herbiers

- Coupe de France runner-up: 2017–18
