= Valentin Vanbaleghem =

French footballer (born 1996)

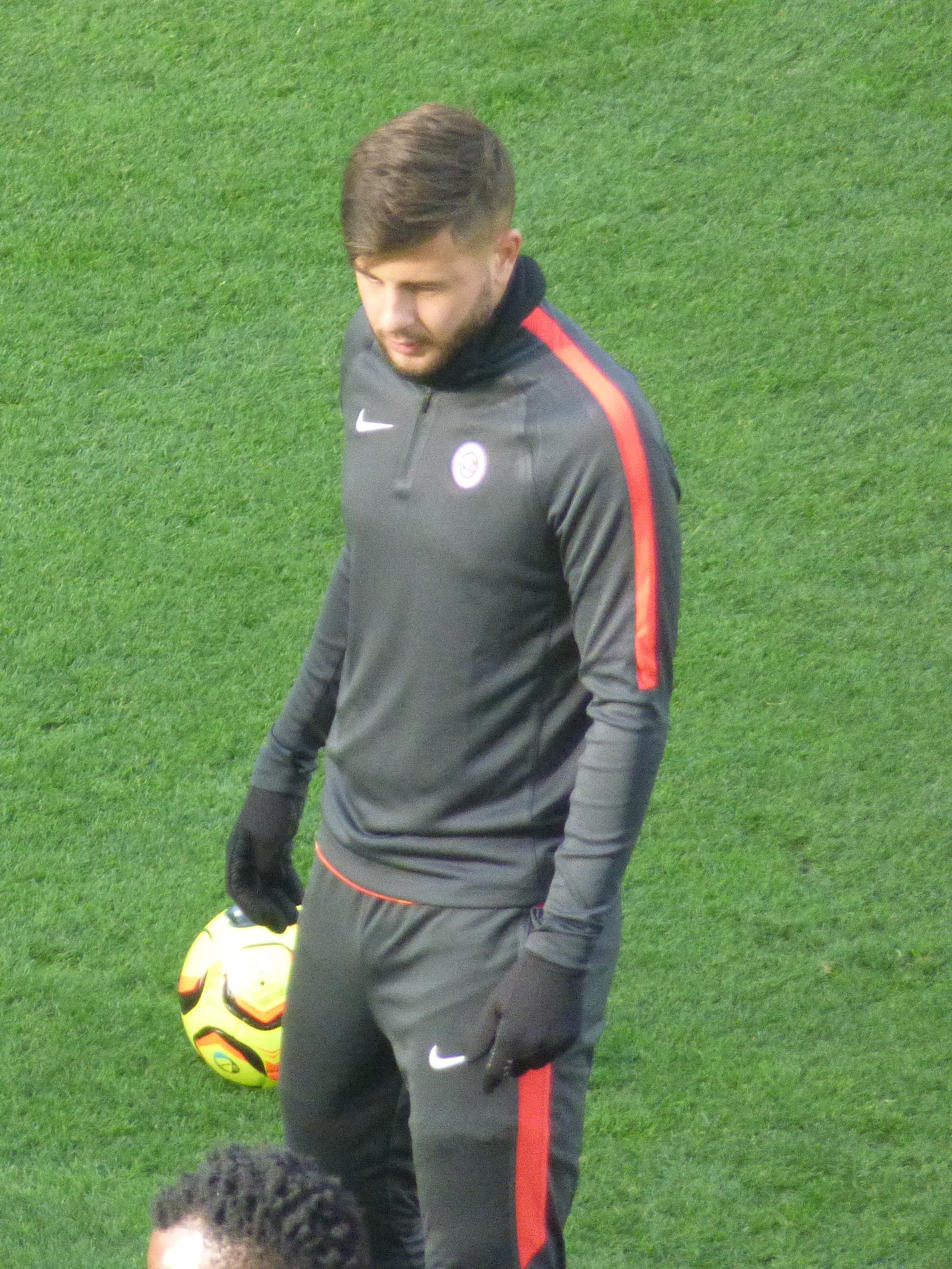
- Vanbaleghem in 2018

Personal information
- Date of birth: 9 October 1996 (age 30)
- Place of birth: Lomme, France
- Height: 1.86 m (6 ft 1 in)
- Position: Midfielder

Team information
- Current team: Lille B

Senior career*
Years	Team	Apps	(Gls)
2013–2016	Lille B	94	(4)
2016–2018	Lille	0	(0)
2016–2018	→ Les Herbiers B (loan)	4	(0)
2016–2018	→ Les Herbiers (loan)	24	(0)
2018–2020	Châteauroux	41	(0)
2020–2022	Perugia	41	(0)
2022	Virton	10	(1)
2022–2023	Sedan	27	(0)
2023–	Lille B	33	(4)
- * Club domestic league appearances and goals as of 20:31, 16 December 2024 (UTC)

Valentin Vanbaleghem (born 9 October 1996) is a French professional footballer who plays as a midfielder for Championnat National 3 side Lille B.

== Career ==
Vanbaleghem is a youth product of Lille, having joined their youth academy at the age of 6. He briefly played for Les Herbiers on loan before moving to Châteauroux in 2018.

He signed a two-years contract with Serie C club Perugia in October 2020. Perugia advanced to Serie B for the 2021–22 season. On 24 January 2022, his contract with Perugia was terminated by mutual consent.

On 26 January 2022, he joined Virton in Belgium.

On 23 May 2022, Vanbaleghem agreed to return to France and signed with Sedan.

== Honours ==
Les Herbiers

- Coupe de France runner-up: 2017–18
