= Jérôme Arpinon =

French association football manager

Personal information
- Date of birth: 5 April 1978 (age 48)
- Place of birth: Nîmes, France

Team information
- Current team: Créteil (manager)

Managerial career
- Years: Team
- 2005–2008: Nîmes B (assistant)
- 2008–2010: Nîmes (assistant)
- 2012–2014: Gazélec Ajaccio (assistant)
- 2014–2020: Nîmes (assistant)
- 2020–2021: Nîmes
- 2023–2024: Virton
- 2025–: Créteil

Jérôme Arpinon (born 5 April 1978) is a French professional football manager who is the manager of Championnat National 1 club Créteil.

== Career ==
In June 2020, Arpinon replaced Bernard Blaquart as manager of Ligue 1 club Nîmes Olympique.

== Managerial statistics ==
As of match played 3 February 2021

Managerial record by team and tenure
| Team | From | To | Record | | | | | | | | |
| Team | From | To | P | W | D | L | GF | GA | GD | Win % | Ref. |
|---|---|---|---|---|---|---|---|---|---|---|---|
| Nîmes | 23 June 2020 | 5 February 2021 | 22 | 4 | 3 | 15 | 17 | 47 | −30 | 18.18 | |
| Total | | | 22 | 4 | 3 | 15 | 17 | 47 | −30 | 18.18 | — |
