= Union Sportive Créteil Football =

Association football club in France

Créteil
- Full name: Union Sportive Créteil
- Nicknames: Les Béliers (The Rams); Les Cristoliens (The Créteiliens); USC
- Founded: 1936; 90 years ago
- Ground: Stade Dominique Duvauchelle
- Capacity: 12,150
- Owner: NJJ Holding (Xavier Niel)
- Manager: Jérôme Arpinon
- League: National 1 Group C
- 2024–25: National 2 Group C, 5th of 16
- Website: www.uscl.fr
Home colours	Away colours	Third colours

Union Sportive Créteil (commonly referred to as US Créteil, USC, or simply Créteil, and formerly as ''Union Sportive Créteil-Lusitanos) is a French football club based in Créteil, a southeastern suburb of Paris. The club was founded in 1936 and currently play in the National 1, the fourth level of French football. The football club forms part of an omnisports club that is also known for its handball team.

US Créteil was founded in 1936 as an omnisports club and have a rich history, despite achieving minimal honours.

The club has won the Division d'Honneur on two occasions in 1962 and 1986. In 1987, Créteil were crowned champions of the now-defunct Division 4 and, a year later, captured the Division 3 title. The club's best finish in the prestigious Coupe de France was during the 1985–86 edition of the competition when the team reached the quarter-finals. For eight consecutive seasons (1999–2007), Créteil played in Ligue 2, the second division of French football. It returned to Ligue 2 in the 2013–14 season. In 2018, the club was relegated to the Championnat National 2.

The team is affectionately known as Les Béliers (lit. 'The Rams') or Les Cristoliens, the name given to the inhabitants of Créteil.

== History ==
Association football ventured to the city of Créteil relatively late compared to other communes located in and around Paris. The first club to enter the fray was Club Sportif de Créteil. However, the club was considered unstable from the start and was declared unofficial as the city was attempting to replicate the passion and heart clubs such as Red Star 93, CA Paris-Charenton, and Racing Club de France displayed in nearby communes. The declaration soon came to fruition following the foundation of Union Sportive Créteil in 1936 by a man commonly known as M. Hemon. Créteil spent almost 30 years hovering in the lower divisions. During this time, the football club played its home matches at the Stade Desmont, which seated only 800 spectators. Under the leadership of B. Hainque, Créteil reached the Championnat de France amateur in 1962. The team then proceeded to falter back into the Promotion d'Honneur before reaching the Division d'Honneur in the new decade.

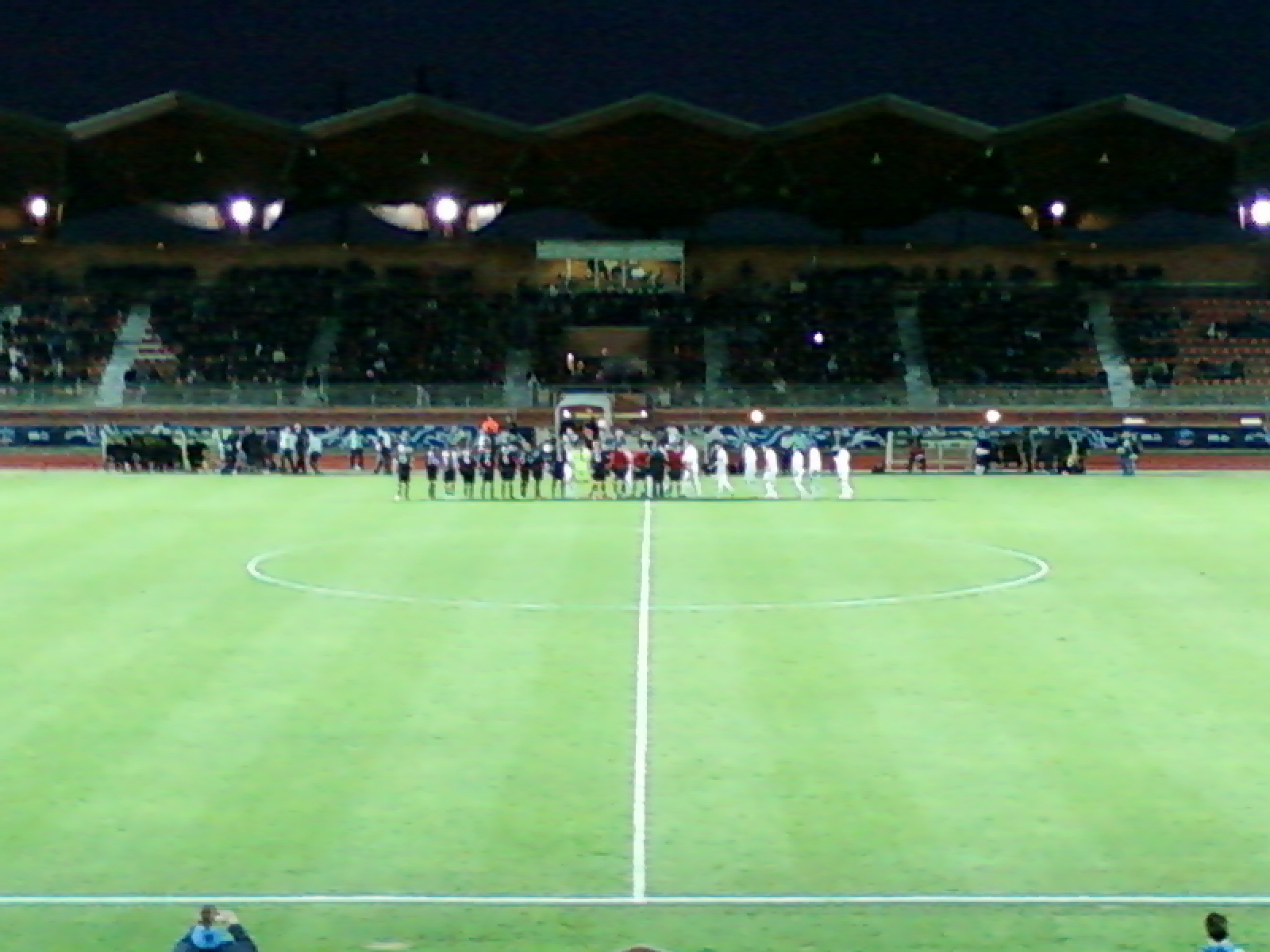
Créteil and Bordeaux lining up at the Stade Dominique Duvauchelle in 2012

Créteil were a lucky beneficiary in 1978 when the French Football Federation announced the creation of the Division 4. The club was promoted to the new league despite its 7th-place finish in the Division d'Honneur the previous season. The team's shaky form showed as they were in dead last after ten matches were contested. By the end of the season, Créteil were back in the Division d'Honneur. In 1983, the club moved into its new stadium, the Stade Dominique Duvauchelle, after having spent almost 50 years at the Stade Desmont. Two years later, under the guidance of the city's deputy mayor Laurent Cathala, Union Sportive Créteil merged with the Créteil omnisports club in order to give the city a better sporting identity. The club's main sports became football, swimming, athletics, and cycling.

US Créteil spent the 2000s between the third division and Ligue 2 before being relegated back to Championnat de France National. In 2002, the club merged with its neighbor Lusitanos, from Saint-Maur-des-Fossés, changing its name to Créteil-Lusitanos.

In the 2012–13 season, the club was promoted back to Ligue 2 and they reached the round of 16 in the 2012 Coupe de France competition before being eliminated by Girondins de Bordeaux. In 2016, the club was relegated from Ligue 2 back to the Championnat National. In 2018, US Créteil were relegated to the Championnat National 2 after finishing bottom of the table.

On 27 May 2019, Créteil were promoted back to the Championnat National after finishing as champions of the Championnat National 2 Group D. They were relegated in May 2022, finishing 17th in the 2021–22 season.

On May 1, 2025, the club was acquired by French businessman Xavier Niel, who was born and raised in the town. The billionaire, now the club’s majority shareholder, arrived with “a project based on three priorities: investing in the future, through the creation and development of a youth academy; professionalizing the club, by strengthening its resources and forming more partnerships; and raising Créteil’s profile, by attracting a broader audience to the stadium and modernizing the club’s image”.

On June 19, 2025, the club announced the appointment of Olivier Miannay as Deputy General Manager, coming from Le Puy Football 43. He had previously led the Créteil club from 2016 to 2018. The appointment of Karim Mokeddem as head coach—former manager of FC Sochaux-Montbéliard and US Orléans—was also announced by the club..

On March 3, 2025, the club announced a new logo and identity, dropping the "Lusitanos" nickname.

== Supporters ==
The club has a small but loyal and fanatical fan-base, mostly from Val-de-Marne, the southern and eastern suburbs of Paris. The club has two ultras groups; Urban Devils founded in 2002, later re-formed in 2005 and Kop de Banlieue founded in 2004. The fans are known as the Cristoliens, inhabitants of Créteil.

Despite playing in a modern facility, the club's level attendance is very low, averaging only around 500 spectators during the Championnat National years, although after promotion that number has risen to around 2500 per game in Ligue 2.

The club has rivalries with Red Star F.C. and Paris FC, with whom they contest the Parisian derbies.

== Attendances ==
Average attendances:

- 2016–17: 508
- 2015–16: 2 188
- 2014–15: 2 389
- 2013–14: 2 603
- 2012–13: 945
- 2011–12: 424
- 2010–11: 515
- 2009–10: 695
- 2008–09: 373
- 2007–08: 403

== Stadium ==
Créteil play its home matches at the 12,000-seat Stade Dominique Duvauchelle, named after Dominique Duvauchelle, a local sports journalist from the city of Créteil.

== Players ==
=== Current squad ===
As of 22 January 2026.

Note: Flags indicate national team as defined under FIFA eligibility rules; some limited exceptions apply. Players may hold more than one non-FIFA nationality.

No.	Pos.	Nation	Player
1	GK	FRA	Hugo Cointard
2	DF	CHA	Ahmad Ngouyamsa
3	DF	FRA	Stephen Quemper
4	DF	FRA	Nathanaël Bai
5	DF	FRA	Zakaria Belkouche
6	MF	FRA	Christopher Baptista
7	MF	FRA	Ryan Ferhaoui
8	MF	FRA	Abdeldjalil Hachem
9	FW	FRA	Romain Montiel
12	FW	FRA	Nama Fofana
13	MF	ALG	Stan Berkani (on loan from Clermont)
14	FW	TUN	Mohamed Ben Fredj
15	FW	CMR	Arsène Elogo
16	GK	FRA	Stanley Kouamé
17	DF	FRA	Ladji Traoré

No.	Pos.	Nation	Player
18	FW	COM	Ibtoihi Hadhari
19	MF	MAD	Tommy Iva
21	FW	FRA	Lenny Leonil
22	DF	FRA	Axel Dauchy
23	MF	FRA	Abdoulaye Diaby
24	MF	FRA	Adrien Louveau
25	MF	FRA	Liamine Mokdad
26	DF	FRA	Thomas Carbonero
27	DF	GUI	Aboubacar Magnora
28	DF	BEN	Brandon Agounon
29	MF	FRA	Billal Mehadji
33	FW	FRA	Youssef Boujenfa
34	MF	BEN	Yannick Aguemon
40	GK	FRA	Yan Marillat
—	MF	FRA	Alexandre Gricourt

=== Notable players ===
For a complete list of former US Créteil players with a Wikipedia article, see here.

- (France) Arnaud Nordin (youth)
- (France) Blaise Matuidi (youth)
- (France) Adrien Rabiot (youth)

== Managers ==
=== Current coaching staff ===
As of 27 June 2014.

Position	Name	Nationality
Manager	Stéphane Masala	French
Assistant manager	Francis de Percin	French
Assistant manager	Jean-Michel Bridier	French
Goalkeeping coach	Jean-Pascal Beaufreton	French
Physiotherapist	Olivier Roussey	French
Medical Doctor	Nicolas Bompard	French
Intendant	Amandio Adubeiro	Portuguese

=== Managerial history ===
US Créteil has had numerous managers and caretaker managers since the club's foundation in 1936. The list below begins with the club's managers since 1986.

Manager	Créteil career	Major Honours
(France) Jean-Marc Komano	1986–88	Won Division 4 and Division 3.
(France) Philippe Redon	1988–89, 1989–90	
(France) Philippe Troussier	1989	
(Uruguay) Ruben Umpierrez	1989	
(Algeria) Fathi Chebel	1989	
(France) Jacky Lemée	1990–92	
(France) Marc Collat	1992–95	
(France) Robert Buiges	1995–96	
(France) Pierre Garcia	1996–97	
(France) Bernard Simondi	1997–99	Achieved promotion to Ligue 2.
(Germany) Gernot Rohr	1999–00	
(France) Laurent Roussey	2000–01	
(Bosnia and Herzegovina) Slaviša Vukićević	2001	
(Spain) Ladislas Lozano	2001–02	
(France) Noël Tosi	2002–03	
(France) Jean-Michel Bridier	2003, 2004	
(France) Jean-Michel Cavalli	2003–04	
(France) Guy David	2004–05	
(France) Albert Rust	2006	
(France) Olivier Frapolli	2006, 2008–09	
(Portugal) Artur Jorge	2006–07	
(France) Thierry Goudet	2007–08	
(France) Laurent Fournier	2009–10	
(France) Hubert Velud	2010–2011	
(France) Jean-Luc Vasseur	2011–2014	Won the 2012–13 Championnat National
(France) Philippe Hinschberger	2014	
(France) Thierry Froger	2014–2015	
(France) Laurent Roussey	2015–Unknown	
(France) Stéphane Le Mignan	2017–2018	
(Portugal) Carlos Secretário	2018–2020	
(France) Richard Déziré	2020–2021	
(France) Emmanuel Da Costa	2021–2022	
(France) Stéphane Masala	2022–	

Managers in italics were hired as caretakers

== Honours ==
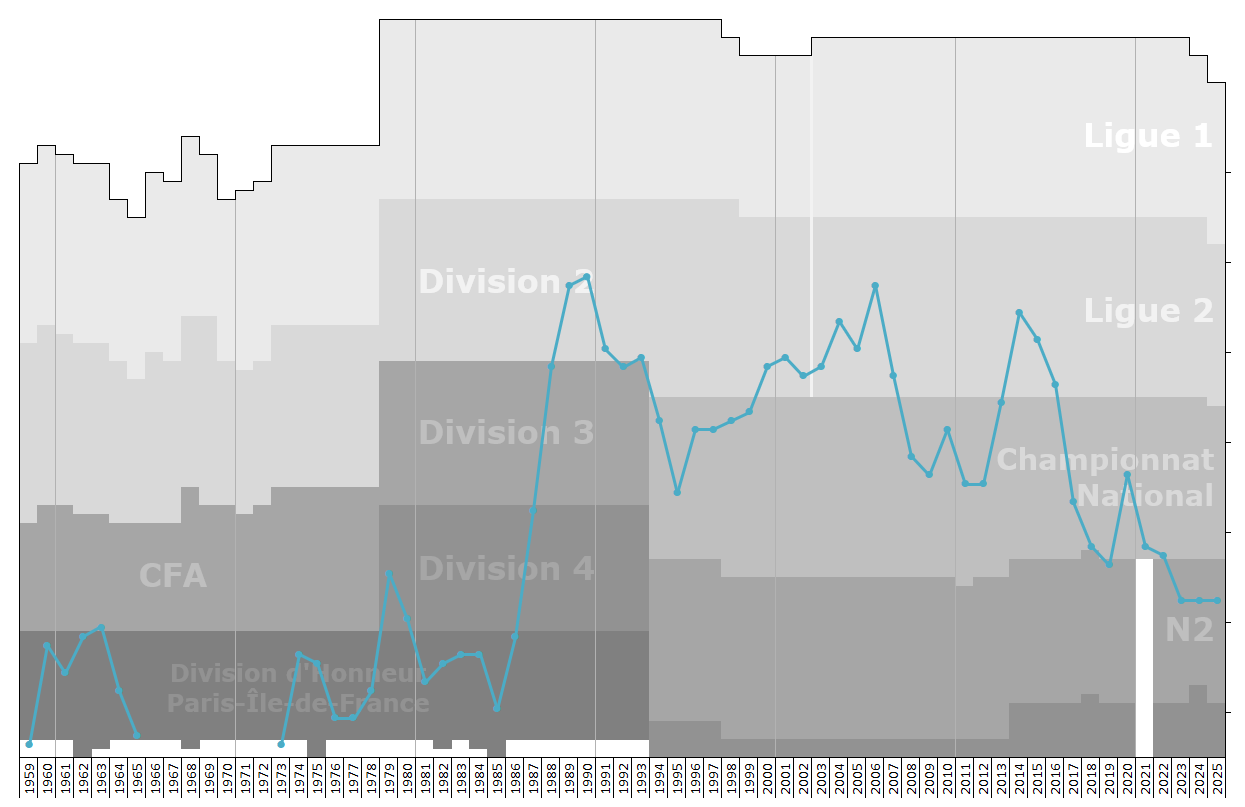
Historical league performance chart of US Créteil

- Championnat National
  - Champions (1): 2013
- Division 4 (CFA 2)
  - Champions (1): 1987, 2019
- Division d'Honneur (Île-de-France)
  - Champions (2): 1962, 1986
- Coupe de Paris – Île-de-France
  - Champions (1) 1998
