= Stéphane Jobard =

French football manager and former player (born 1971)

Personal information
- Date of birth: 21 February 1971 (age 55)
- Place of birth: Langres, France
- Height: 1.82 m (6 ft 0 in)
- Position: Midfielder

Team information
- Current team: Belgium (assistant)

Senior career*
| Years | Team | Apps | (Gls) |
| 1992–1998 | Cercle Dijon | | |
| 1998–2006 | Dijon | | |

Managerial career
- 2010–2012: Dijon B
- 2019–2020: Dijon
- 2021–2022: Boulogne
- 2022–: Al Nassr (assistant)
- * Club domestic league appearances and goals

Stéphane Jobard (born 21 February 1971) is a French professional football coach and former player who works as an assistant coach for the Belgium men's national football team, under the direction of head coach Rudi Garcia. As a player, he was a midfielder.

== Playing career ==
Born in Langres, Jobard played club football for Cercle Dijon and Dijon.

== Coaching career ==
Jobard worked as manager of Dijon B and as an assistant manager at Dijon. He left the club in 2018 after being accused of theft, and became an assistant manager of Marseille, before returning to Dijon as manager in June 2019. He was sacked by the club in November 2020.

On 15 December 2021, Jobard was hired by Championnat National club Boulogne. He left the club in May 2022. He would go on to join Saudi Professional League club Al Nassr as an assistant coach later that year, working under the direction of head coach Rudi Garcia.

By June 2026 he was an assistant coach for the Belgian national team.
