= Les Herbiers VF =

Football club in Les Herbiers, France

- Full name: Vendée Les Herbiers Football
- Nickname: VHF
- Founded: 1919; 107 years ago
- Ground: Stade Massabielle
- Capacity: 5,000
- Chairman: Michel Landreau
- Manager: Laurent David
- League: National 2
- 2024–25: National 2 Group B, 2nd
- Website: www.vendeelesherbiersfootball.fr
Home colours	Away colours

Les Herbiers Vendée Football (French pronunciation: [lez‿ɛʁbje vɑ̃de futbol]) is a French football club based in Les Herbiers, Vendée. It was founded in 1919. They play at the Stade Massabielle, which has a capacity of 5,000 people. The colours of the club are red and black.

From 2016 to 2018, the club played in the third-tier Championnat National, the highest level it had ever reached. As of the 2025–26 season, the club's first team competes in the Championnat National 1.

== History ==
In 1919, Father Rousseau founded the club "Alouette Sportive" which became "Les Herbiers Sports" in 1923. In 1941, the club "Coqs du Bocage" was born in Petit-Bourg des Herbiers.

The merger of the two clubs was determined in a general meeting on 7 March 1947. According to FFF regulations, it became effective on 1 July 1947. The club was renamed the "Entente Sportive Herbretaise" in 1949.

Les Herbiers played regional football until 1978, when they were invited to the newly created French fourth division, but they were relegated to the regional leagues in 1979. The club technically joined the fourth tier of French soccer in 1975.

The red-blacks fell as far as the seventh division before working their way back into the national football structure in 2007, followed by promotion to the third division in 2015. Les Herbiers avoided relegation in their first two seasons in the third division.

In 2002, the Entente Sportive Herbretaise changed its name to "The Herbiers Football (HVF). In 2006, the club again changed its name to "The Vendee Herbiers Football (VHF).

On 17 April 2018, Les Herbiers defeated fellow third-division side Chambly to reach the final of the Coupe de France. Les Herbiers upset second-division Lens in the quarterfinals and Auxerre in the round of 16 en route to the final, making their run to the final without facing a first-division team. Les Herbiers lost the final 2–0 to Paris Saint-Germain on 8 May 2018.

On 11 May 2018, Les Herbiers were beaten 4–1 at Béziers to drop to the Championnat National 2 – the 4th tier of French football – and the same level as Paris Saint-Germain's reserve team at the time. In May 2022, Laurent David replaced Stéphane Masala as head coach. Masala had been the manager since 2018, when he brought the side to the final of the Coupe de France.

== Current squad ==
As of 9 October 2025

Note: Flags indicate national team as defined under FIFA eligibility rules; some limited exceptions apply. Players may hold more than one non-FIFA nationality.

No.	Pos.	Nation	Player
1	GK	FRA	Bastien Rempp
4	DF	FRA	Malick Lopy
6	DF	FRA	Antoine Kerriou
7	MF	FRA	Pierre Lavenant
8	MF	FRA	Brendan Lebas
9	FW	FRA	Jérémy Billy
10	MF	GAB	Jack Rissonga
11	FW	FRA	Arthur Fiquet
14	FW	GUI	N'Famara Diaby
15	DF	SMN	Alexandre Tégar
16	GK	FRA	Eliot Pasture
17	FW	FRA	Noah Adekalom
18	DF	GUF	Yannis Letard

No.	Pos.	Nation	Player
19	MF	FRA	Alexandre Vincent
20	DF	FRA	Loïc Breton
21	FW	FRA	Mamadou Sacko
22	DF	FRA	Madiba Gassama
24	MF	FRA	Sony Butrot
25	DF	FRA	Benjamin Brelivet
26	MF	CMR	Marco Dayawa
27	FW	FRA	Tanguy Guérineau
28	DF	FRA	Redha Fresneau
29	FW	SMN	Rahim Denis
30	GK	FRA	Jules Cathelineau
—	MF	BEN	David Djigla

== Reserve teams ==
Les Herbiers has a reserve team that plays in Régional 1 Pays de la Loire, a third team in Régional 3, a fourth team in District 2 Vendée and a fifth team in District 4 Vendée.

== Honours ==
- Coupe de France runners-up: 2017–18
- Atlantique DH championship: 1999
- Championnat de France amateur 2 Group G: 2006
