= Alphonse Areola =

French footballer (born 1993)

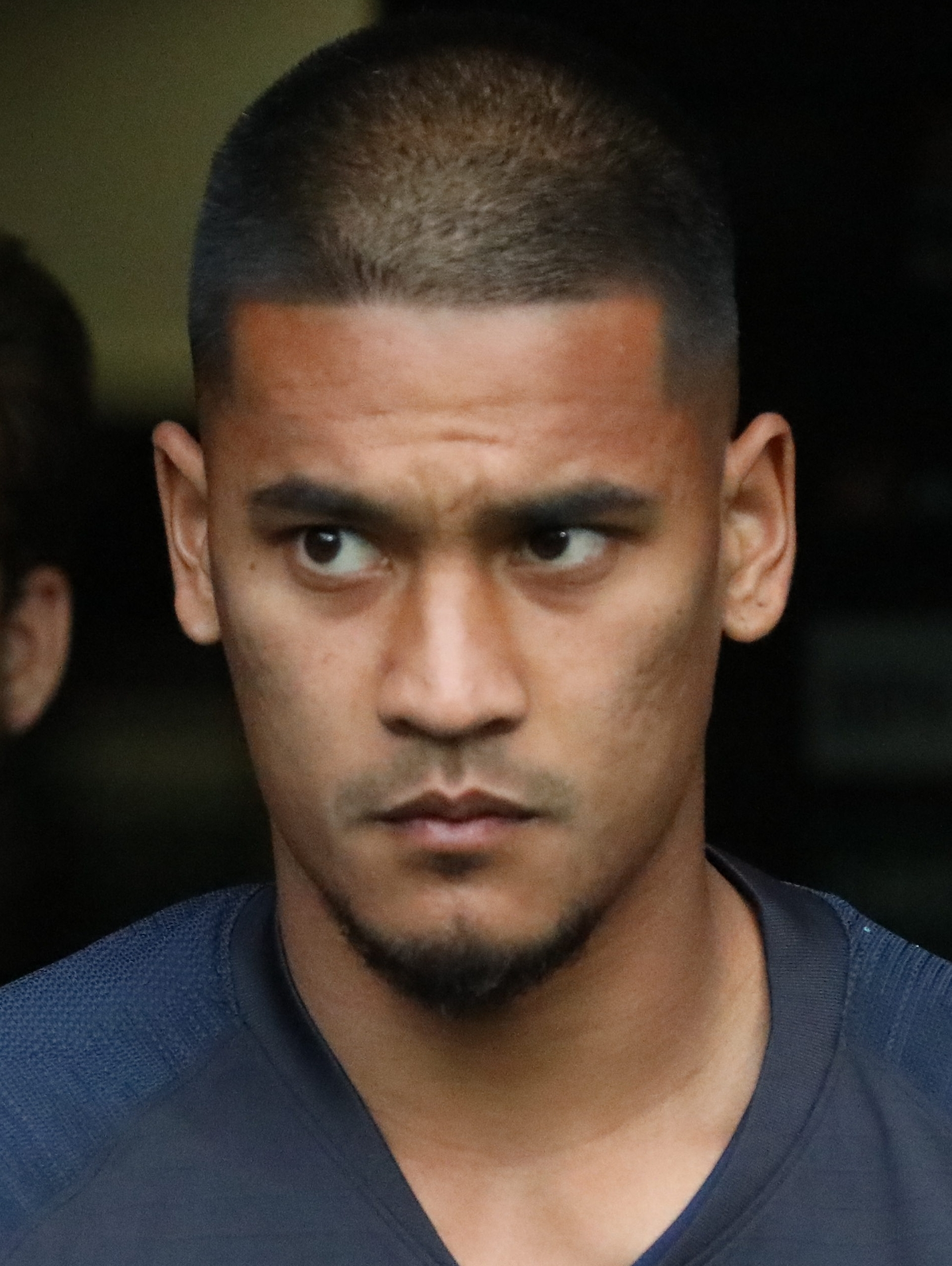
- Areola with Paris Saint-Germain in 2019

Personal information
- Full name: Alphonse Francis Areola
- Date of birth: 27 February 1993 (age 33)
- Place of birth: Paris, France
- Height: 1.95 m (6 ft 5 in)
- Position: Goalkeeper

Team information
- Current team: West Ham United
- Number: 23

Youth career
- 1999–2006: Petits Anges
- 2006–2012: Paris Saint-Germain
- 2006–2009: INF Clairefontaine

Senior career*
Years	Team	Apps	(Gls)
2010–2013	Paris Saint-Germain B	57	(0)
2013–2022	Paris Saint-Germain	75	(0)
2013–2014	→ Lens (loan)	35	(0)
2014–2015	→ Bastia (loan)	35	(0)
2015–2016	→ Villarreal (loan)	32	(0)
2019–2020	→ Real Madrid (loan)	4	(0)
2020–2021	→ Fulham (loan)	36	(0)
2021–2022	→ West Ham United (loan)	1	(0)
2022–	West Ham United	82	(0)

International career
2008–2009	France U16	14	(0)
2009–2010	France U17	10	(0)
2010–2011	France U18	4	(0)
2011–2012	France U19	8	(0)
2012–2013	France U20	16	(0)
2013–2014	France U21	9	(0)
2018–2022	France	5	(0)
Medal record
Men's football
Representing France
FIFA World Cup
Winner	2018 Russia
Runner-up	2022 Qatar
FIFA U-20 World Cup
Winner	2013 Turkey
- * Club domestic league appearances and goals as of 19:35, 31 January 2026 (UTC)

Alphonse Francis Areola (French: [alfɔ̃s aʁeɔla]; born 27 February 1993) is a French professional footballer who plays as a goalkeeper for EFL Championship club West Ham United.

An academy graduate of Paris Saint-Germain (PSG), he spent the early parts of his career on loan, enjoying spells with Lens, Bastia, and Villarreal. During his stint with Villarreal, Areola broke the club record for the longest period of play without conceding a goal, remaining unbeaten for a period of 620 minutes. He returned to PSG in 2016, where he went on to make over 100 appearances. In 2019, Areola joined Real Madrid on a season-long loan. In 2020, he joined Fulham on loan; he followed up with another loan to West Ham United in 2021. In June 2022, Areola joined West Ham for a fee in the region of €12 million.

Areola has represented France at every youth level and was part of the squads that won the 2013 FIFA U-20 World Cup and the 2018 FIFA World Cup.

== Club career ==
=== Paris Saint-Germain ===
==== Early life and career ====
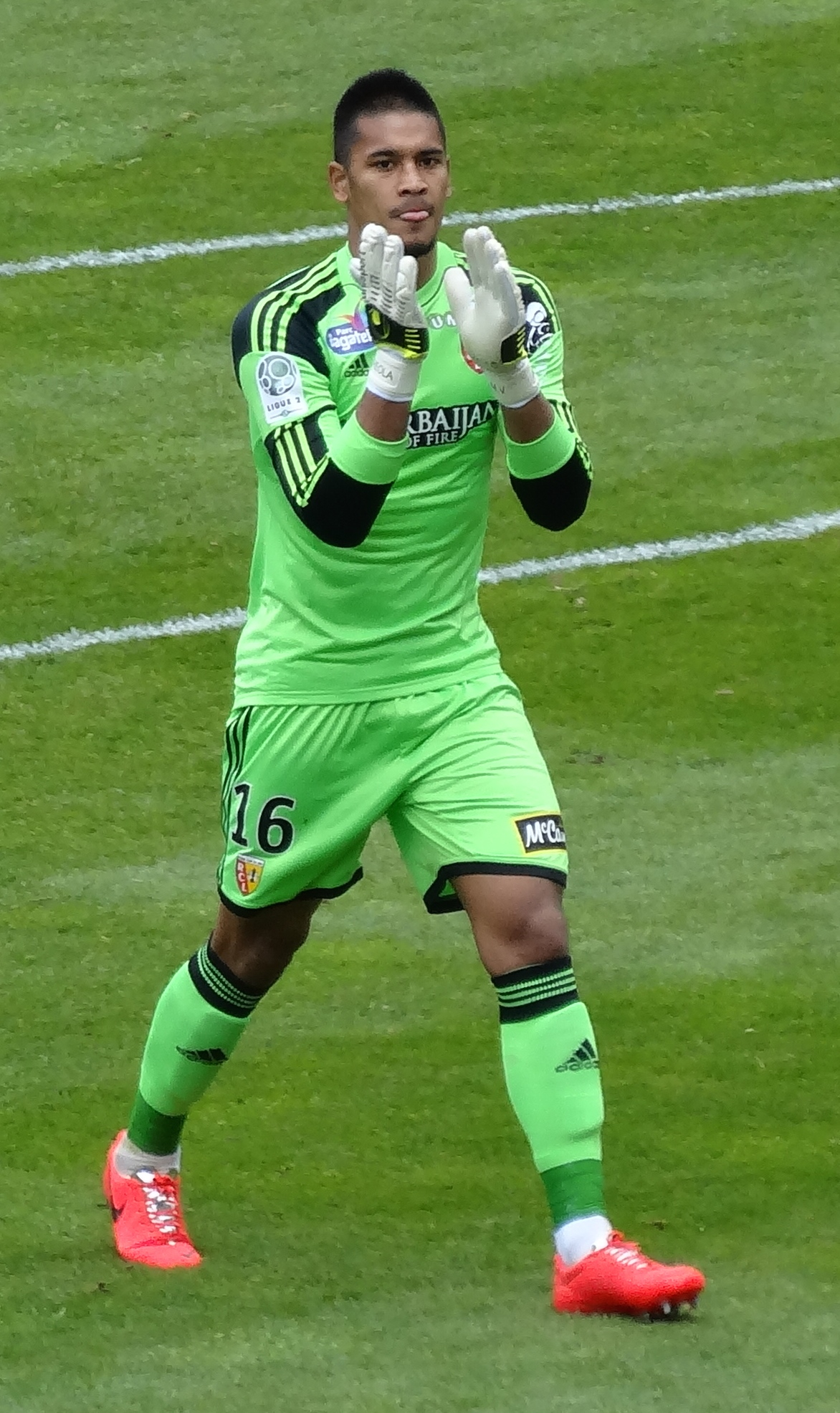
Areola playing for Lens in 2014

Alphonse Francis Areola born on 27 February 1993 in Paris, France, to Cleto and Heidi, who immigrated to France from the Philippines in the late 1980s. He began playing football at the age of six for Entente Sportive des Petits Anges and spent seven years at his local club before signing for Ligue 1 side Paris Saint-Germain (PSG). When Areola was 13, and upon the advice of coaches in Paris, he enrolled at the INF Clairefontaine football centre to further his development. He returned to PSG in 2009 and signed his first professional contract with the Parisians in July 2009, putting pen to paper on a three-year deal.

On 18 May 2013, having progressed through the club's academy, Areola made his senior debut for PSG, replacing first-choice goalkeeper Salvatore Sirigu in the 48th minute of a 3–1 home win over Brest. PSG had been crowned Ligue 1 champions prior to the match and their opponents were already relegated. He made his first start for the club the following weekend in a 3–1 win over Lorient, playing 61 minutes in what was the final match of the season before being substituted for fourth-choice keeper Ronan Le Crom, who was sent off later in the match for a foul on Julien Quercia.

==== 2013–16: Loans to Lens, Bastia and Villarreal ====
On 23 July 2013 he was loaned to Ligue 2 side Lens, who were managed by former PSG manager Antoine Kombouaré, for the 2013–14 Ligue 1 season. Areola immediately displaced Rudy Riou as the club's starting keeper and made 36 appearances for the campaign, included in which was his Coupe de France debut. He also helped the club to a second-place finish in the league, thereby earning promotion to Ligue 1. Areola's performances throughout the course of the season earned him the Ligue 2 Goalkeeper of the Year award and a spot in the Team of the Season. He was also awarded the Eurosport Revelation of the Year award, beating the likes of N'Golo Kante and Gaëtan Bussmann. A verbal agreement was in place for Areola to remain with Sang et Or on loan for the following season but the club's financial position raised concerns with the League's National Directorate of Management Control and ultimately put paid to the possibility of him returning.

Areola would get a chance in Ligue 1, however, as Claude Makélélé's Bastia stepped in to sign him on loan for the 2014–15 Ligue 1 campaign, with the deal being completed on 26 July 2014. Signed as the replacement for the retired Mickaël Landreau, he made his debut for the club on 9 August in a 3–3 draw with Marseille. Areola ultimately made 39 appearances across all competitions for the club, keeping 13 clean sheets as Bastia ended the Ligue 1 season in 12th place and as runners-up in the Coupe de la Ligue. The final, which took place on 11 April, was contested between Bastia and Areola's parent club PSG, with the match ending 4–0 in favour of the Parisians.

On 17 June 2015, La Liga side Villarreal announced the signing of Areola on season-long loan as a replacement for regular keeper Sergio Asenjo who had suffered a long-term injury the season before. He made his debut for the club on the opening day of the season in a 1–1 draw with Real Betis. At Villarreal, Areola enhanced his burgeoning reputation by keeping 15 clean sheets in 37 matches and conceding only 26 goals as the club ended the season in fourth place in La Liga. His clean-sheet tally for the league season was bettered by only two goalkeepers, Jan Oblak of Atlético Madrid, and Claudio Bravo of Barcelona. Areola also broke the club record of 615 minutes of football played without conceding a goal which was previously held by Diego López, ultimately going 620 minutes unbeaten before conceding against Las Palmas. Outside of domestic football, the Frenchman featured in the Europa League for the first time in his career, making five appearances as El Submarino Amarillo reached the semi-finals where they lost to eventual runners-up, Liverpool.

==== 2016–2019: Return to PSG ====
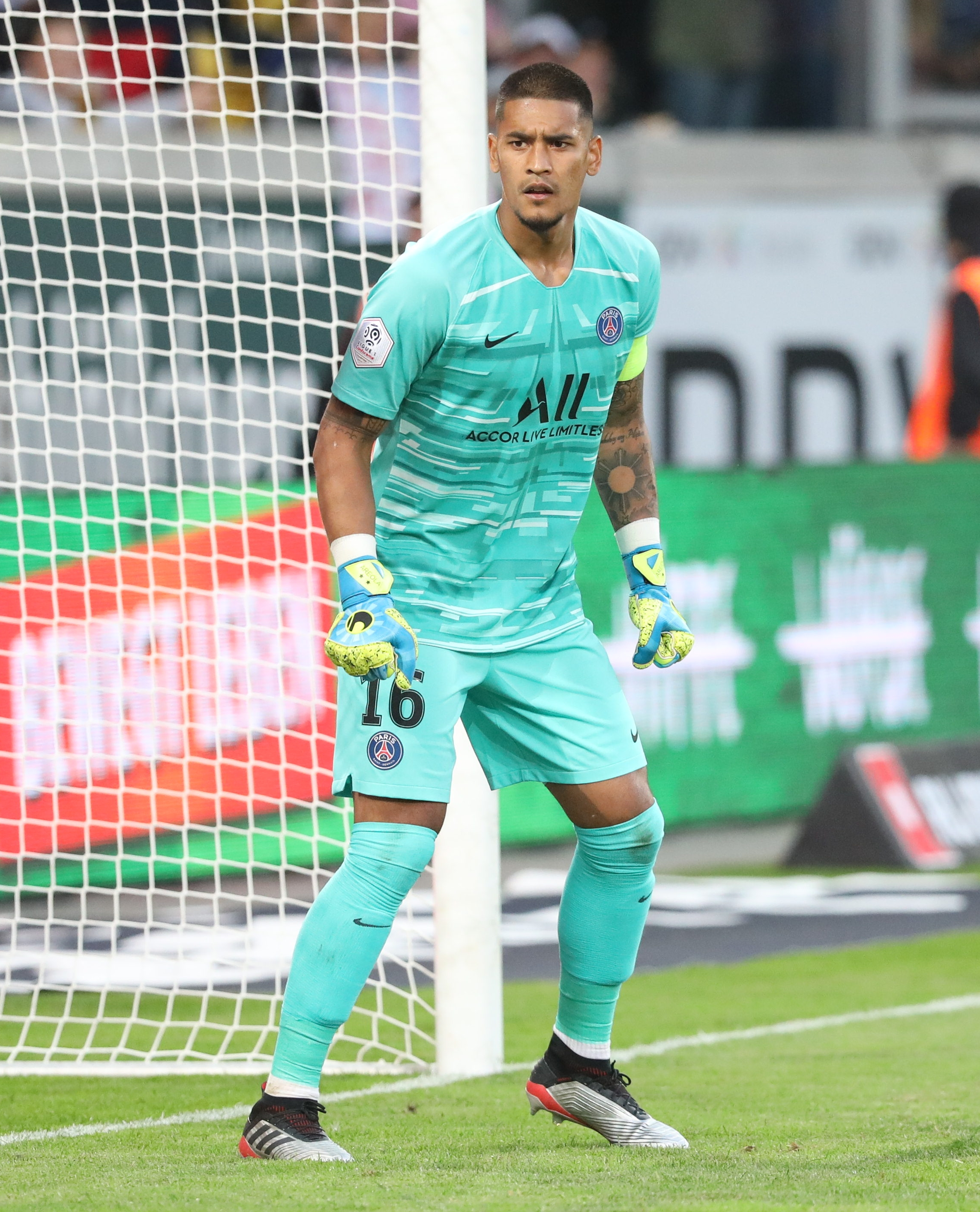
Areola playing for Paris Saint-Germain in 2019

Following his successful stint in Spain, Areola returned to PSG for the 2016–17 Ligue 1 season. He began the campaign as understudy to German keeper Kevin Trapp, who had signed the season before, and was in PSG's match-day squad for their 4–1 Trophée des Champions victory over Lyon. He made his first appearance following his return on 13 September in a 1–1 Champions League draw with Arsenal, in what was also his debut in the competition. Following the match against Arsenal, Areola established himself as PSG's first-choice goalkeeper and had kept four clean sheets in eight appearances by mid-October. However, he suffered a downturn in form soon after and ultimately relinquished his place to Trapp after a string of matches in December in which he conceded 10 goals from just 11 shots faced. In April the following year, he was an unused substitute as PSG beat Monaco 4–1 to claim a record fourth straight Coupe de la Ligue title but started in a 1–0 win over Angers which saw PSG lift the Coupe de France title the following month.

The following season, on 29 July 2017, Areola earned his second Trophée des Champions medal when he started in a 2–1 win over Monaco which saw PSG claim their fifth consecutive title. He continued the season as PSG's undisputed goalkeeper in the league and Europe, with Trapp favoured in cup competitions, and was a regular feature in the club's record-breaking progression through the group stages of the Champions League. With Areola in goal, PSG conceded just once in their opening five matches and scored 24 goals, the most ever by a club in the group stages of the competition. On 31 March 2018, in a repeat of the previous seasons's final, Areola was an unused substitute as PSG retained the Coupe de la Ligue title with a 3–0 win over Monaco. The following month, on 15 April, he started in goal as PSG again defeated Monaco, who were the reigning league champions, 7–1 to claim the Ligue 1 title. The club completed a domestic treble on 8 May when they defeated third division side Les Herbiers to lift the Coupe de France trophy for a record fourth consecutive season; though Areola was an unused substitute in the final.

Areola was relegated to a rotational role during the following season after the club signed veteran goalkeeper Gianluigi Buffon from Juventus. He made his 100th PSG appearance on 21 April 2019 during a 3–1 win over Monaco, on the same day that the club secured its eighth league title.

==== 2019–2021: Loans to Real Madrid and Fulham ====
On 2 September 2019, Areola returned to Spain when he joined Real Madrid on a season-long loan as part of a deal that saw Keylor Navas move in the opposite direction to PSG. He made his debut for the club on 25 September, starting in a 2–0 league win over Osasuna. However, he was predominantly used as a back-up option to first-choice goalkeeper Thibaut Courtois for the remainder of the campaign and made just nine appearances across all competitions, including four appearances during the league season, as Real won the 2019–20 La Liga title.

On 9 September 2020, Areola signed for Fulham on a season-long loan with an option to buy. He made his debut for the club one week later in a 1–0 win against Ipswich Town in the EFL Cup. At the end of the season, Fulham suffered relegation from the Premier League, and Areola's option to buy was not exercised by the London club. However, he did win Fulham Player of the Season, as voted by the supporters.

=== West Ham United ===
On 29 July 2021, West Ham United announced the signing of Areola on a season-long loan deal with an option to buy. On 22 September, he made his debut, in a 1–0 win against Manchester United at Old Trafford in the EFL Cup. He made 11 appearances in the Europa League conceding eight goals with five clean sheets as West Ham made the semi-finals of the 2021–22 Europa League. He also played one game in the Premier League and appeared in the FA Cup and League Cup.

Areola completed his permanent transfer to West Ham United on 27 June 2022, signing a five-year contract with an option for a further year. The transfer fee paid to PSG was reportedly in the region of €12 million.

On 7 June 2023, Areola played in the 2023 UEFA Europa Conference League final against Fiorentina in Prague. West Ham won their first trophy in 43 years with a 2–1 victory.

== International career ==
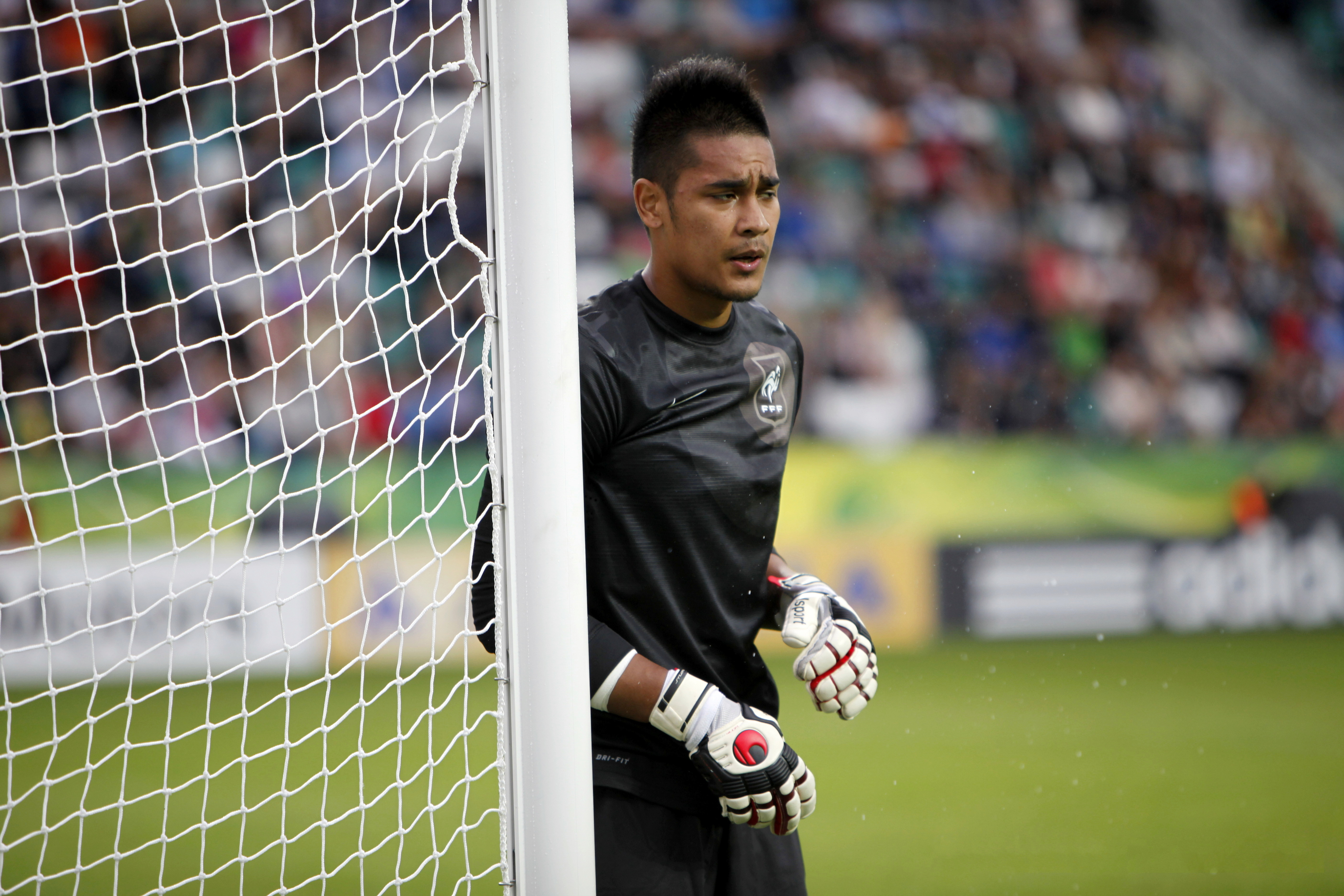
Areola playing for France under-19s

Areola has played for France at all youth levels.

=== Youth ===
Areola represented France at every youth level from U16 to U21 between 2008 and 2014. He was the hero for France in the 2013 FIFA U-20 World Cup Final. Having ended goalless after extra-time, the match went to a penalty shoot out where Areola saved spot-kicks from Uruguay's Emiliano Velázquez and Giorgian De Arrascaeta to lead his nation to their first ever triumph in the tournament. He had previously featured for France at the 2010 UEFA European Under-17 Championship and the 2012 UEFA European Under-19 Championship's, and subsequently at the 2015 UEFA European Under-21 Championship.

=== Senior ===
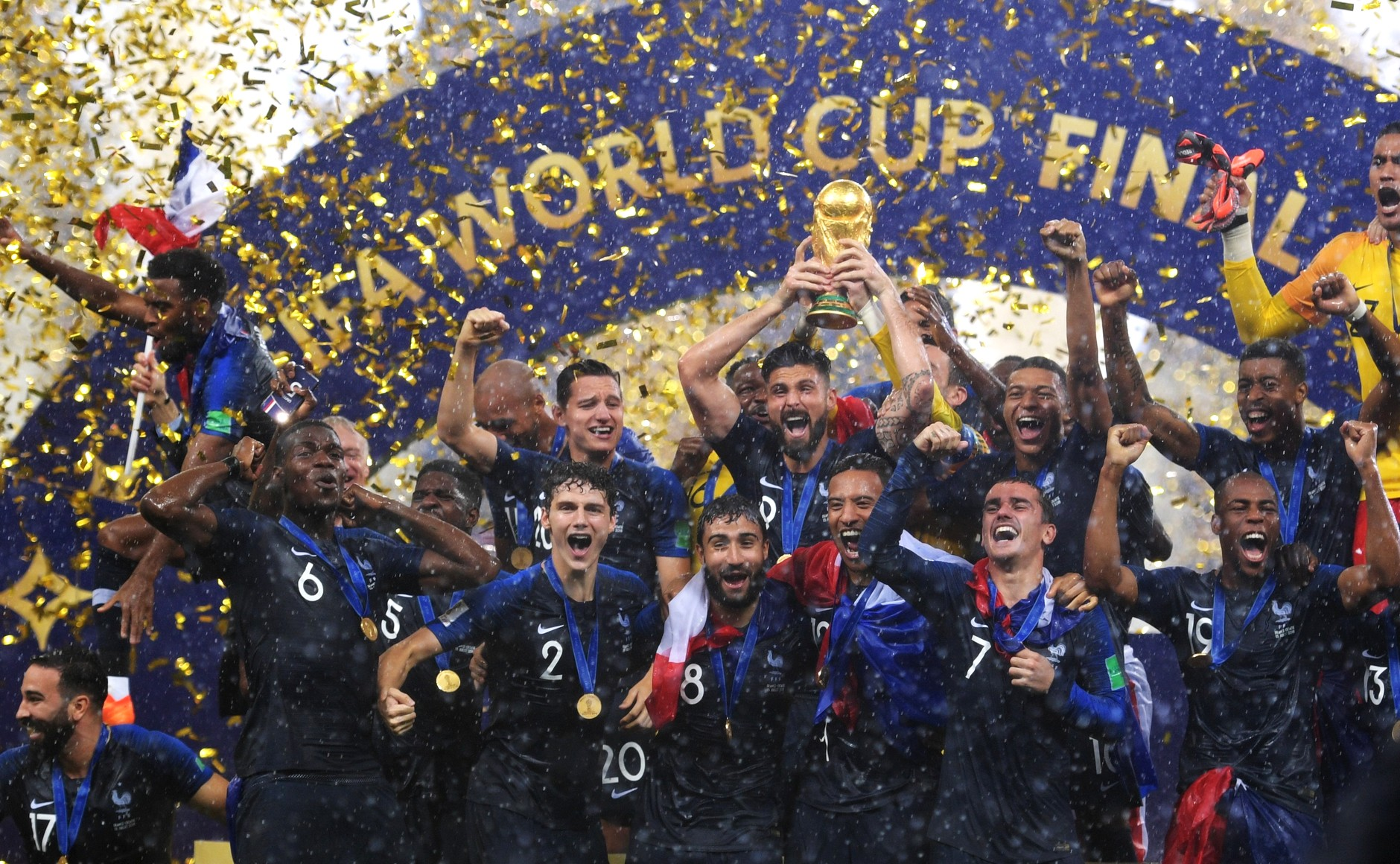
Areola (top right, in yellow) was part of the France squad which won the 2018 FIFA World Cup in Russia.

On 1 October 2015, Areola received his first call-up to the senior team by manager Didier Deschamps for friendlies against Armenia and Denmark as part of the French team's build-up to hosting UEFA Euro 2016. He failed to make the tournament squad, but would be called up on three occasions for friendlies and World Cup qualifiers in September through to November 2016, although he was forced to withdraw from the latter squad after spraining his ankle.

On 17 May 2018, he was named in Deschamps' 23-man squad for the 2018 FIFA World Cup in Russia. There he served as the third goalkeeper behind Hugo Lloris and Steve Mandanda as France went on to lift the title. In doing so, he became the first player since Argentina's Héctor Zelada in 1986 to lift the World Cup trophy despite being uncapped for his country at the time. Later that year, and due to a thigh injury sustained by Lloris, Areola was designated as France's starting goalkeeper for the nation's opening UEFA Nations League match against Germany on 6 September. He kept a clean sheet on his senior international debut and was named man of the match in the encounter which ended in a goalless draw. In May 2024, he was named in France's squad for Euro 2024.

== Career statistics ==
=== Club ===
As of match played 5 April 2026

Appearances and goals by club, season and competition
Club	Season	League			National cup (Note: Includes Coupe de France, Copa del Rey, FA Cup)		League cup (Note: Includes Coupe de la Ligue, EFL Cup)		Europe		Other		Total	
Club	Season	Division	Apps	Goals	Apps	Goals	Apps	Goals	Apps	Goals	Apps	Goals	Apps	Goals
Paris Saint-Germain B	2010–11	CFA	18	0	—		—		—		—		18	0
Paris Saint-Germain B	2011–12	CFA	20	0	—		—		—		—		20	0
Paris Saint-Germain B	2012–13	CFA	19	0	—		—		—		—		19	0
Paris Saint-Germain B	Total		57	0	—		—		—		—		57	0
Paris Saint-Germain	2011–12	Ligue 1	0	0	0	0	0	0	0	0	—		0	0
Paris Saint-Germain	2011–12	Ligue 1	0	0	0	0	0	0	0	0	—		0	0
Paris Saint-Germain	2012–13	Ligue 1	2	0	0	0	0	0	0	0	—		2	0
Paris Saint-Germain	2016–17	Ligue 1	15	0	5	0	1	0	6 (Note: Appearances in UEFA Champions League)	0	0	0	27	0
Paris Saint-Germain	2017–18	Ligue 1	34	0	0	0	0	0	8	0	1 (Note: Appearance in Trophée des Champions)	0	43	0
Paris Saint-Germain	2018–19	Ligue 1	21	0	5	0	2	0	3	0	0	0	31	0
Paris Saint-Germain	2019–20	Ligue 1	3	0	0	0	0	0	0	0	1	0	4	0
Paris Saint-Germain	Total		75	0	10	0	3	0	17	0	2	0	107	0
Lens (loan)	2013–14	Ligue 2	35	0	1	0	0	0	—		—		36	0
Bastia (loan)	2014–15	Ligue 1	35	0	1	0	3	0	—		—		39	0
Villarreal (loan)	2015–16	La Liga	32	0	0	0	—		5 (Note: Appearance(s) in UEFA Europa League)	0	—		37	0
Real Madrid (loan)	2019–20	La Liga	4	0	3	0	—		2	0	0	0	9	0
Fulham (loan)	2020–21	Premier League	36	0	0	0	1	0	—		—		37	0
West Ham United (loan)	2021–22	Premier League	1	0	3	0	3	0	11	0	—		18	0
West Ham United	2022–23	Premier League	5	0	2	0	1	0	15 (Note: Appearances in UEFA Europa Conference League)	0	—		23	0
West Ham United	2023–24	Premier League	31	0	0	0	1	0	1	0	—		33	0
West Ham United	2024–25	Premier League	26	0	0	0	0	0	—		—		26	0
West Ham United	2025–26	Premier League	20	0	3	0	1	0	—		—		24	0
West Ham United	2026–27	Championship	0	0	0	0	0	0	—		0	0	0	0
West Ham United	West Ham total		82	0	8	0	6	0	27	0	—		123	0
Career total			357	0	23	0	13	0	50	0	3	0	446	0

=== International ===
As of match played 25 September 2022

Appearances and goals by national team and year
National team	Year	Apps	Goals
France	2018	2	0
France	2019	1	0
France	2022	2	0
Total		5	0

== Honours ==
Paris Saint-Germain

- Ligue 1: 2012–13, 2017–18, 2018–19, 2019–20
- Coupe de France: 2016–17, 2017–18; runner-up: 2018–19
- Coupe de la Ligue: 2016–17, 2017–18
- Trophée des Champions: 2016, 2017, 2019

Bastia

- Coupe de la Ligue runner-up: 2014–15

Real Madrid

- La Liga: 2019–20
- Supercopa de España: 2020

West Ham United

- UEFA Europa Conference League: 2022–23

France U20

- FIFA U-20 World Cup: 2013

France

- FIFA World Cup: 2018; runner-up: 2022

Individual

- UEFA European Under-19 Championship Team of the Tournament: 2012
- Ligue 2 Goalkeeper of the Year: 2013–14
- Ligue 2 Team of the Season: 2013–14
- Eurosport Revelation of the Year: 2014
- UEFA Champions League Breakthrough XI: 2016
- Premier League Save of the Month: October 2023, January 2026
- Fulham Player of the Season: 2020–21
- UEFA Europa Conference League Team of the Season: 2022–23

Orders

- Knight of the Legion of Honour: 2018
