= 2017 Trophée des Champions =

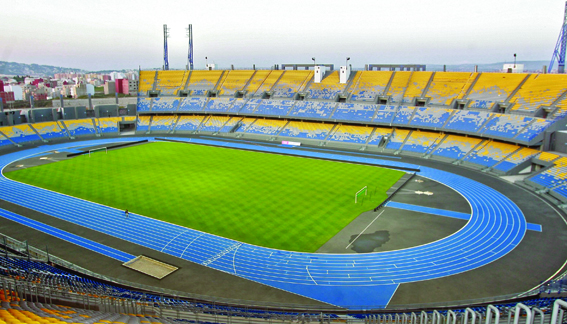
- The Stade Ibn Batouta in Tangier hosted the match
- Event: Trophée des Champions
Monaco	Paris Saint-Germain
1	2
- Date: 29 July 2017
- Venue: Stade Ibn Batouta, Tangier, Morocco
- Man of the Match: Dani Alves (Paris Saint-Germain)
- Referee: Noureddine El Jaafari (Morocco)
- Attendance: 43,761

The 2017 Trophée des Champions (transl. 2017 Champions Trophy) was the 22nd edition of the Trophée des Champions, the annual super cup in France. The match was contested by the 2016–17 Ligue 1 champions Monaco, and the 2016–17 Coupe de France champions Paris Saint-Germain. The match was played at the Stade Ibn Batouta in Tangier, Morocco.

Paris Saint-Germain were the four-time defending champions, having defeated Lyon 4–1 in the 2016 edition, which was played in Austria.

Paris Saint-Germain won the match 2–1 for their seventh Trophée des Champions title.

== Match ==
=== Summary ===
Djibril Sidibé opened the scoring for Monaco in the 30th minute when he ran through on goal before clipping the ball past the advancing goalkeeper Alphonse Areola from just outside the penalty area with his right foot. Dani Alves equalised in the 51st minute, scoring with his right foot from a free-kick which went over the wall and into the top left corner from over 25 yards out. Adrien Rabiot got the winning goal in the 63rd minute when he headed into the net from six yards out after a cross from the right from Dani Alves.

=== Details ===
29 July 2017
20:00 WEST

Monaco	1–2	Paris Saint-Germain
Sidibé 30'	Report	Dani Alves 51'; Rabiot 63'

Stade Ibn Batouta, Tangier
Attendance: 43,761
Referee: Noureddine El Jaafari (Morocco)

Monaco	Paris Saint-Germain

GK	1	(Croatia) Danijel Subašić
RB	38	(Mali) Almamy Touré
CB	25	(Poland) Kamil Glik	(yellow card) 51'
CB	5	(Brazil) Jemerson
LB	4	(Netherlands) Terence Kongolo		(substituted off) 66'
RM	19	(France) Djibril Sidibé	(yellow card) 49'	(substituted off) 77'
CM	17	(Belgium) Youri Tielemans
CM	2	(Brazil) Fabinho	(yellow card) 82'
LM	27	(France) Thomas Lemar
CF	9	(Colombia) Radamel Falcao (c)
CF	10	(France) Kylian Mbappé		(substituted off) 71'
Substitutes:
GK	16	(Switzerland) Diego Benaglio
DF	6	(Brazil) Jorge
DF	24	(Italy) Andrea Raggi
MF	8	(Portugal) João Moutinho
MF	12	(France) Allan Saint-Maximin		(substituted on) 77'
MF	20	(Portugal) Rony Lopes		(substituted on) 66'
FW	11	(Argentina) Guido Carrillo		(substituted on) 71'
Manager:
(Portugal) Leonardo Jardim

GK	16	(France) Alphonse Areola
RB	12	(Belgium) Thomas Meunier
CB	5	(Brazil) Marquinhos
CB	2	(Brazil) Thiago Silva (c)
LB	20	(France) Layvin Kurzawa
CM	6	(Italy) Marco Verratti	(yellow card) 82'	(substituted off) 90'
CM	8	(Italy) Thiago Motta		(substituted off) 71'
CM	25	(France) Adrien Rabiot
RF	32	(Brazil) Dani Alves
CF	9	(Uruguay) Edinson Cavani
LF	10	(Argentina) Javier Pastore		(substituted off) 86'
Substitutes:
GK	1	(Germany) Kevin Trapp
DF	3	(France) Presnel Kimpembe
MF	14	(France) Blaise Matuidi		(substituted on) 71'
MF	18	(Argentina) Giovani Lo Celso
MF	24	(France) Christopher Nkunku		(substituted on) 90'
FW	15	(Portugal) Gonçalo Guedes		(substituted on) 86'
FW	22	(Spain) Jesé
Manager:
(Spain) Unai Emery

Man of the Match:
Dani Alves (Paris Saint-Germain)

Assistant referees:
Hicham Ait Abbou (Morocco)
Lahcen Azgaou (Morocco)
Fourth official:
Adil Zourak (Morocco)

Match rules

- 90 minutes.
- Penalty shoot-out if scores level.
- Seven named substitutes, of which up to three may be used.

== See also ==
- 2017–18 Ligue 1
- 2017–18 Coupe de France
- 2017–18 AS Monaco FC season
- 2017–18 Paris Saint-Germain FC season
