= Giovani Lo Celso =

Argentine footballer (born 1996)

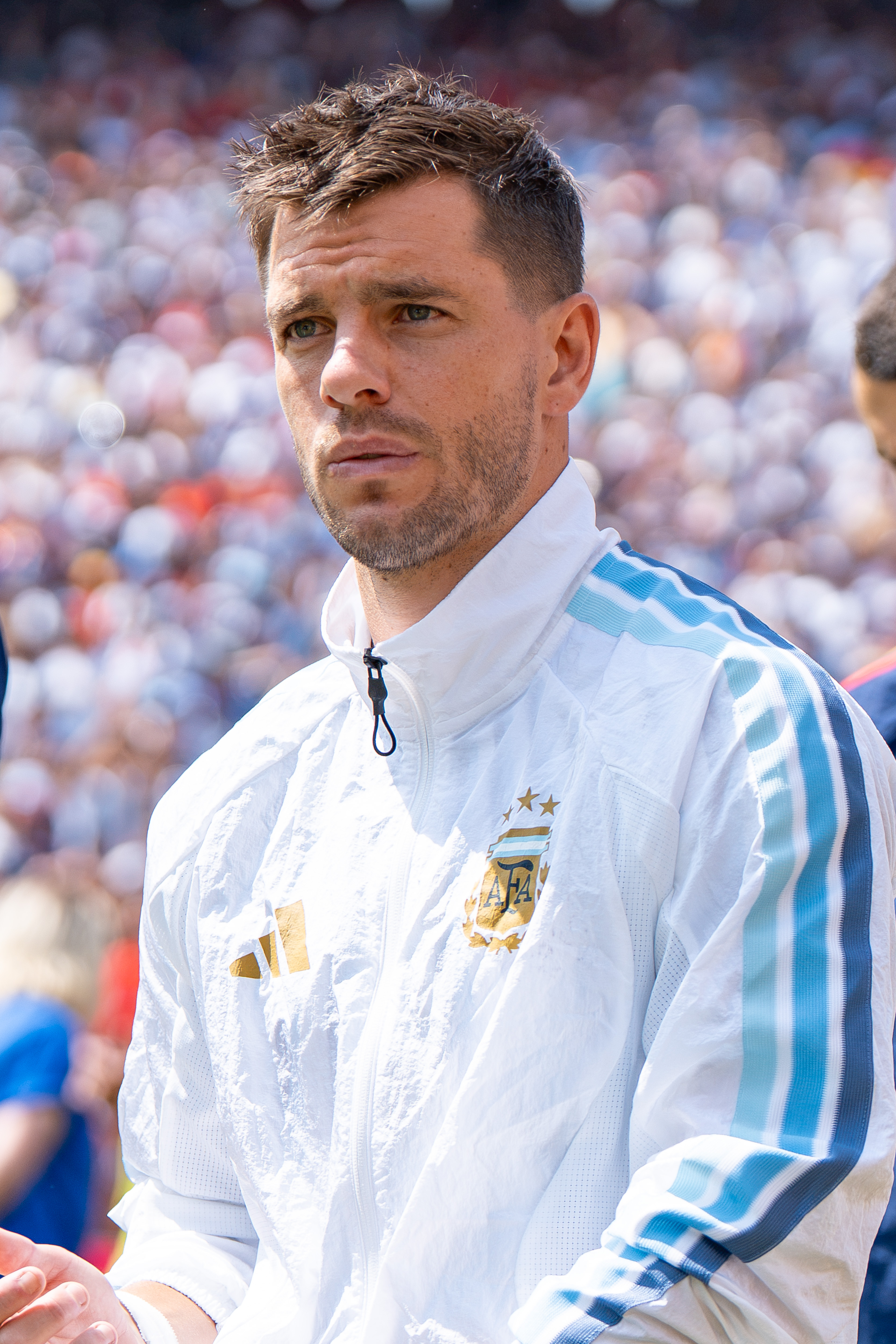
- Lo Celso with Argentina in 2026

Personal information
- Full name: Giovani Lo Celso
- Date of birth: 9 April 1996 (age 30)
- Place of birth: Rosario, Argentina
- Height: 1.77 m (5 ft 10 in)
- Position: Attacking midfielder

Team information
- Current team: Betis
- Number: 20

Youth career
- 2010–2015: Rosario Central

Senior career*
| Years | Team | Apps | (Gls) |
| 2015–2016 | Rosario Central | 27 | (3) |
| 2016–2019 | Paris Saint-Germain | 38 | (4) |
| 2016 | → Rosario Central (loan) | 9 | (1) |
| 2018–2019 | → Betis (loan) | 27 | (8) |
| 2019–2020 | Betis | 5 | (1) |
| 2019–2020 | → Tottenham Hotspur (loan) | 28 | (0) |
| 2020–2024 | Tottenham Hotspur | 49 | (3) |
| 2022–2023 | → Villarreal (loan) | 38 | (3) |
| 2024– | Betis | 52 | (10) |

International career^{‡}
| 2016 | Argentina Olympic | 3 | (0) |
| 2017– | Argentina | 68 | (5) |
Medal record
Men's football
Representing Argentina
FIFA World Cup
| Runner-up | 2026 Canada–Mexico–US |
Copa América
| Winner | 2021 Brazil |
| Winner | 2024 United States |
| Third place | 2019 Brazil |
CONMEBOL–UEFA Cup of Champions
| Winner | 2022 England |
- * Club domestic league appearances and goals as of 25 October 2026 ‡ National team caps and goals as of 27 June 2026

Giovani Lo Celso (local pronunciation: [ʃoˈβa.ni lo ˈsel.so]Italian pronunciation: [lo ˈt͡ʃɛl.so]; born 9 April 1996) is an Argentine professional footballer who plays as an attacking midfielder for La Liga club Real Betis and the Argentina national team.

== Club career ==
=== Rosario Central ===
Lo Celso is a youth product of Rosario Central. He made his league debut at 19 July 2015 against Vélez Sarsfield in a 0–0 home draw. On 28 February 2016, Lo Celso scored his first Rosario Central goal in a 3–0 victory over Colón, netting Rosario's first in the 6th minute. He then went on to score his second of the campaign in a 3–2 defeat to Vélez Sarsfield on 10 April 2016.

=== Paris Saint-Germain ===
On 26 July 2016, Lo Celso joined French giants Paris Saint-Germain on a five-year deal until 2021, for a fee around the margin of £8.5m. He remained at Rosario Central on loan until 31 December 2016. He made his debut for the French side on 5 April 2017 in a Coupe de France quarter final game against US Avranches. He replaced Adrien Rabiot in the 63rd minute of a 4–0 away win.

Lo Celso came on and assisted for Dani Alves' goal in the UEFA Champions League match against Celtic FC to make the scoreline 7–1. He scored his first goal for PSG in a 3–2 Coupe de la Ligue win against Rennes on 30 January 2018.

On 8 May 2018, he scored as PSG won 2–0 against Les Herbiers VF to clinch the 2017–18 Coupe de France.

=== Real Betis ===
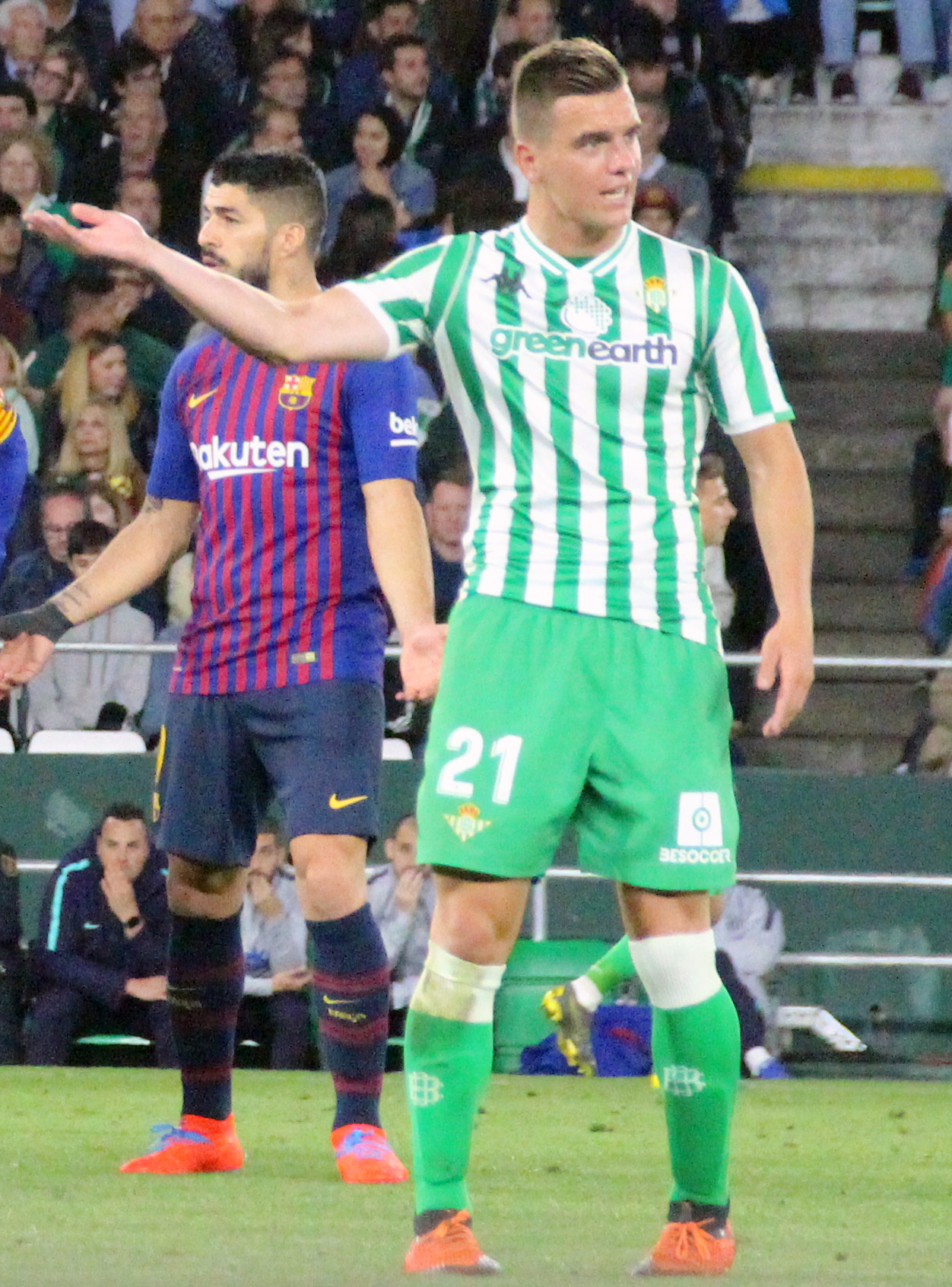
Lo Celso with Real Betis in 2019

On 31 August 2018, Lo Celso joined La Liga side Real Betis on a season-long loan with an option to buy. Betis triggered this option on 16 April 2019 and Lo Celso joined the club on a permanent basis. During his time at the club, Lo Celso made 46 appearances in all competitions, scoring 16 goals.

=== Tottenham Hotspur ===
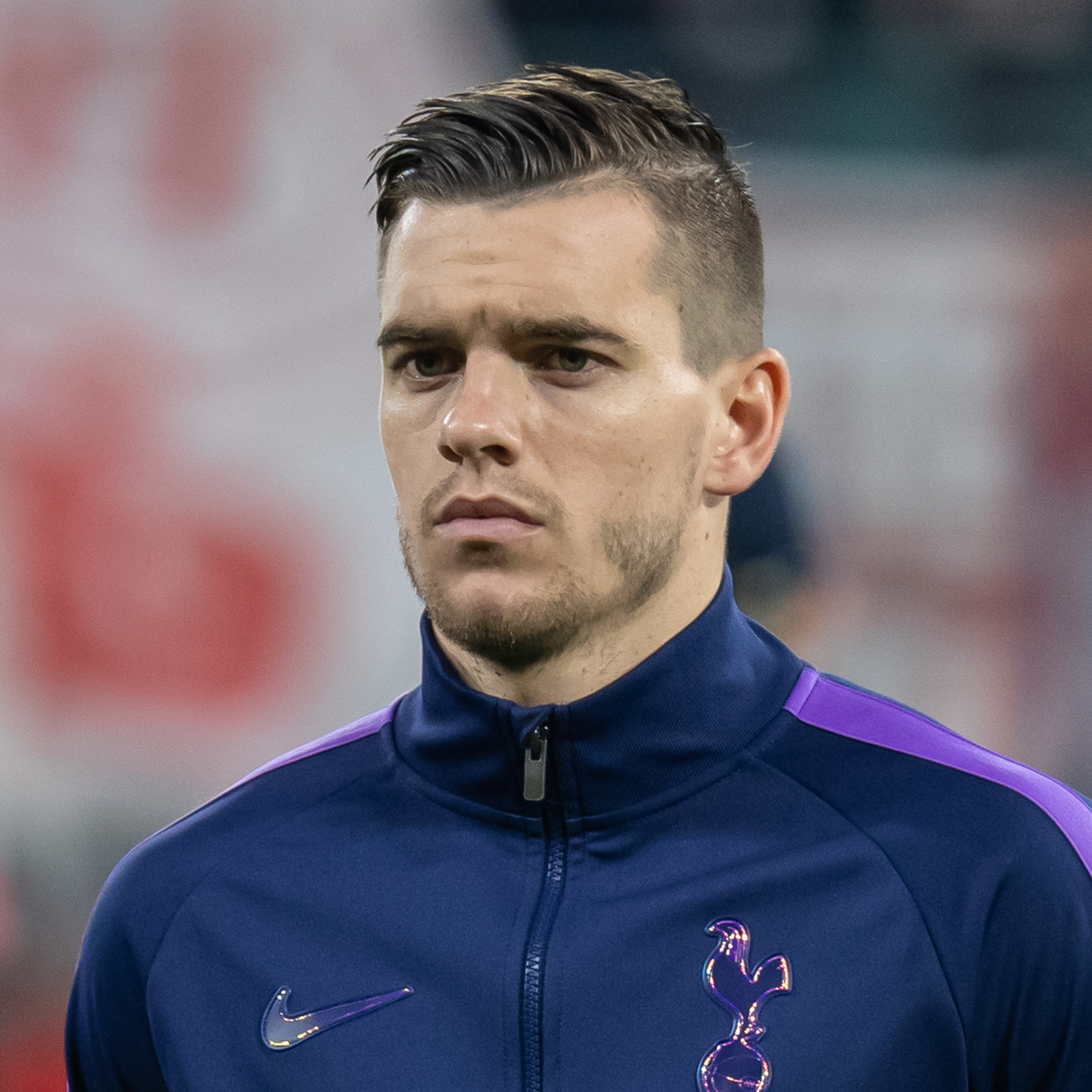
Lo Celso with Tottenham Hotspur in 2020

On 8 August 2019, Lo Celso signed for Tottenham Hotspur on a season-long loan with an option to buy, after a long summer of speculation over his future. He made his debut for Tottenham as a late substitute in the second Premier League match of the season against Manchester City that ended 2–2, a match notable for a controversy over VAR and a new rule on handball introduced that season.

After three substitute appearances for the club, Lo Celso injured his hip while on international duty for Argentina. After returning from injury, he made his first start for Tottenham, scoring his first goal for the club that kicked off a 4–0 win over Red Star Belgrade in the UEFA Champions League, which was the first away win for Tottenham in six months. On 14 January 2020, Lo Celso scored the opening goal in a 2–1 win for Spurs against Middlesbrough in the FA Cup.

Lo Celso's contract was made permanent on 28 January 2020 with the new deal running until the summer of 2025.

In the 2020–21 season, Lo Celso scored his first goals of the season when he netted a brace in the 7–2 win against Maccabi Haifa in a Europa League play-off match. On 21 November 2020, Lo Celso scored his first Premier League goal, 35 seconds after coming on as a substitute in the match against Manchester City, which helped secure a 2–0 win.

==== Loan to Villarreal ====
On 31 January 2022, Lo Celso joined La Liga club Villarreal on loan until the end of the 2021–22 season. On 14 August 2022, he rejoined Villarreal on loan for the 2022–23 season. In November 2022, Lo Celso suffered a hamstring injury, which was successfully operated by surgeon Lasse Lempainen in Turku, Finland.

==== Return to Tottenham ====
On 26 November 2023, Lo Celso made his first Premier League start for Tottenham in over two years, scoring Tottenham's only goal in a 2–1 defeat to Aston Villa. In the following game, Lo Celso scored his second goal of the 2023–24 season in a 3–3 draw against Manchester City.

=== Return to Real Betis ===
On 30 August 2024, before the transfer window closed, Lo Celso departed Tottenham Hotspur and returned to Real Betis, signing a four-year deal. He made his first notable impact after his return on 18 September 2024, scoring twice in a 2–1 league victory against Getafe, including a penalty and a deflected strike.

== International career ==
=== Youth ===
Due to some impressive performances at Rosario Central, Lo Celso earned a call-up to the Argentina U23 squad for the 2016 Summer Olympics. On 4 August 2016, Lo Celso made his Argentina U23 debut in a 2–0 defeat against Portugal, replacing Cristian Espinoza in the 72nd minute.

=== Senior ===
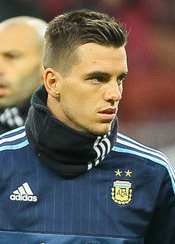
Lo Celso warming up for Argentina in 2017

On 11 November 2017, Lo Celso debuted for the Argentine senior squad in a 1–0 victory over Russia as a starter, only to be replaced by Alejandro Gómez in the 59th minute.

In May 2018, Lo Celso was named in Argentina's preliminary 35-man squad for the 2018 FIFA World Cup in Russia; he was later included in the final 23-man selection for the tournament.

In May 2019, Lo Celso was included in Lionel Scaloni's final 23-man Argentina squad for the 2019 Copa América. On 28 June, in the quarter-finals of the tournament, Lo Celso scored Argentina's second goal in a 2–0 victory over Venezuela, which enabled his team to advance to the semi-finals of the competition.

In June 2021, Lo Celso was once again included in Scaloni's final Argentina 28-man squad for the 2021 Copa América, which the team eventually won. He also played against Italy in the Finalissima, which Argentina won 3–0 at Wembley Stadium, England on 1 June 2022. He was not included in the 2022 FIFA World Cup squad, due to a hamstring injury.

After recovering from his injury, he returned to the team, being a usual in Scaloni's call-ups despite not having much game time in Tottenham. On 21 November 2023, in a game for the 2026 FIFA World Cup qualifiers against Brazil at the Estadio Maracana, he provided an assist from a corner kick to Nicolás Otamendi in what would be a 1–0 away win, which became the first time the latter had lost a qualifiers game in home condition.

In June 2024, Lo Celso was included in Lionel Scaloni's final 26-man Argentina squad for the 2024 Copa América. On 14 July, in the final against Colombia, he came off the bench in the 97th minute of extra-time replacing Enzo Fernández. In the 112th minute, he provided the assist to Lautaro Martínez that ended up in the goal that would crown Argentina champions.

On 27 May 2026, Lo Celso was selected in the 26-man squad for the 2026 FIFA World Cup. On 28 June, he scored his first World Cup goal from a direct free kick in a 3–1 win against Jordan, making him the first Argentine player since Lionel Messi to score at the World Cup. On 15 July, after Argentina's 2–1 victory over England in the 2026 FIFA World Cup semifinals, Lo Celso was one of several Argentina players who held up a banner saying "Las Malvinas son Argentinas" (The Falklands are Argentine).

== Personal life ==
Born and raised in Argentina, Lo Celso also holds an Italian passport due to his Italian heritage. His younger brother Francesco is also a professional footballer and currently plays for Estudiantes RC.

== Career statistics ==
=== Club ===
As of match played 12 November 2026

Appearances and goals by club, season and competition
| Club | Season | League | | | National cup (Note: Includes Copa Argentina, Coupe de France, Copa del Rey, FA Cup) | | League cup (Note: Includes Coupe de la Ligue, EFL Cup) | | Continental | | Other | | Total | |
| Club | Season | Division | Apps | Goals | Apps | Goals | Apps | Goals | Apps | Goals | Apps | Goals | Apps | Goals |
|---|---|---|---|---|---|---|---|---|---|---|---|---|---|---|
| Rosario Central | 2014 | Argentine Primera División | 0 | 0 | 0 | 0 | — | | — | | — | | 0 | 0 |
| Rosario Central | 2015 | Argentine Primera División | 13 | 0 | 3 | 0 | — | | — | | — | | 16 | 0 |
| Rosario Central | 2016 | Argentine Primera División | 14 | 2 | 1 | 0 | — | | 9 (Note: Appearances in Copa Libertadores) | 0 | — | | 24 | 2 |
| Rosario Central | 2016–17 | Argentine Primera División | 9 | 1 | 5 | 0 | — | | — | | — | | 14 | 1 |
| Rosario Central | Total | | 36 | 3 | 9 | 0 | — | | 9 | 0 | — | | 54 | 3 |
| Paris Saint-Germain | 2016–17 | Ligue 1 | 4 | 0 | 1 | 0 | 0 | 0 | — | | — | | 5 | 0 |
| Paris Saint-Germain | 2017–18 | Ligue 1 | 33 | 4 | 4 | 1 | 4 | 1 | 7 (Note: Appearances in UEFA Champions League) | 0 | 0 | 0 | 48 | 6 |
| Paris Saint-Germain | 2018–19 | Ligue 1 | 1 | 0 | — | | — | | — | | 0 | 0 | 1 | 0 |
| Paris Saint-Germain | Total | | 38 | 4 | 5 | 1 | 4 | 1 | 7 | 0 | 0 | 0 | 54 | 6 |
| Real Betis | 2018–19 | La Liga | 32 | 9 | 6 | 2 | — | | 7 (Note: Appearances in UEFA Europa League) | 5 | — | | 45 | 16 |
| Tottenham Hotspur (loan) | 2019–20 | Premier League | 28 | 0 | 4 | 1 | 0 | 0 | 5 | 1 | — | | 37 | 2 |
| Tottenham Hotspur | 2020–21 | Premier League | 18 | 1 | 0 | 0 | 1 | 0 | 9 | 4 | — | | 28 | 5 |
| Tottenham Hotspur | 2021–22 | Premier League | 9 | 0 | 1 | 0 | 4 | 0 | 5 (Note: Appearances in UEFA Europa Conference League) | 2 | — | | 19 | 2 |
| Tottenham Hotspur | 2023–24 | Premier League | 22 | 2 | 1 | 0 | 1 | 0 | — | | — | | 24 | 2 |
| Tottenham Hotspur | Tottenham total | | 77 | 3 | 6 | 2 | 6 | 0 | 19 | 7 | — | | 108 | 11 |
| Villarreal (loan) | 2021–22 | La Liga | 16 | 1 | — | | — | | 6 | 0 | — | | 22 | 1 |
| Villarreal (loan) | 2022–23 | La Liga | 22 | 2 | 0 | 0 | — | | 7 | 0 | — | | 29 | 2 |
| Villarreal (loan) | Total | | 38 | 3 | 0 | 0 | — | | 13 | 0 | — | | 51 | 3 |
| Real Betis | 2024–25 | La Liga | 25 | 8 | 2 | 0 | — | | 7 (Note: Appearances in UEFA Conference League) | 1 | — | | 34 | 9 |
| Real Betis | 2025–26 | La Liga | 24 | 2 | 2 | 0 | — | | 6 | 1 | — | | 32 | 3 |
| Real Betis | 2026–27 | La Liga | 3 | 0 | 1 | 0 | — | | 1 | 0 | — | | 5 | 0 |
| Real Betis | Total | | 52 | 10 | 5 | 0 | — | | 14 | 2 | — | | 71 | 12 |
| Career total | | | 273 | 32 | 31 | 4 | 10 | 1 | 69 | 14 | 0 | 0 | 383 | 51 |

=== International ===
As of match played 27 June 2026

Appearances and goals by national team and year
| National team | Year | Apps | Goals |
|---|---|---|---|
| Argentina | 2017 | 2 | 0 |
| Argentina | 2018 | 8 | 1 |
| Argentina | 2019 | 11 | 1 |
| Argentina | 2020 | 2 | 0 |
| Argentina | 2021 | 13 | 0 |
| Argentina | 2022 | 5 | 0 |
| Argentina | 2023 | 7 | 0 |
| Argentina | 2024 | 13 | 1 |
| Argentina | 2025 | 4 | 1 |
| Argentina | 2026 | 3 | 1 |
| Total | | 68 | 5 |

Scores and results list Argentina's goal tally first.

List of international goals scored by Giovani Lo Celso
| No. | Date | Venue | Opponent | Score | Result | Competition |
|---|---|---|---|---|---|---|
| 1 | 7 September 2018 | Los Angeles Memorial Coliseum, Los Angeles, United States | Guatemala | 2–0 | 3–0 | Friendly |
| 2 | 28 June 2019 | Maracanã Stadium, Rio de Janeiro, Brazil | Venezuela | 2–0 | 2–0 | 2019 Copa América |
| 3 | 22 March 2024 | Lincoln Financial Field, Philadelphia, United States | El Salvador | 3–0 | 3–0 | Friendly |
| 4 | 10 October 2025 | Hard Rock Stadium, Miami Gardens, United States | Venezuela | 1–0 | 1–0 | Friendly |
| 5 | 27 June 2026 | AT&T Stadium, Arlington, United States | Jordan | 1–0 | 3–1 | 2026 FIFA World Cup |

== Honours ==
Paris Saint-Germain

- Ligue 1: 2017–18
- Coupe de France: 2016–17, 2017–18
- Coupe de la Ligue: 2017–18
- Trophée des Champions: 2017, 2018

Tottenham Hotspur

- EFL Cup runner-up: 2020–21

Betis

- UEFA Conference League runner-up: 2024–25

Argentina

- Copa América: 2021, 2024
- CONMEBOL–UEFA Cup of Champions: 2022
- FIFA World Cup runner-up: 2026

=== Individual ===
- UEFA Europa League Breakthrough XI: 2018
- UEFA La Liga Breakthrough Team of the Year: 2018–19
