= Kevin Trapp =

German footballer (born 1990)

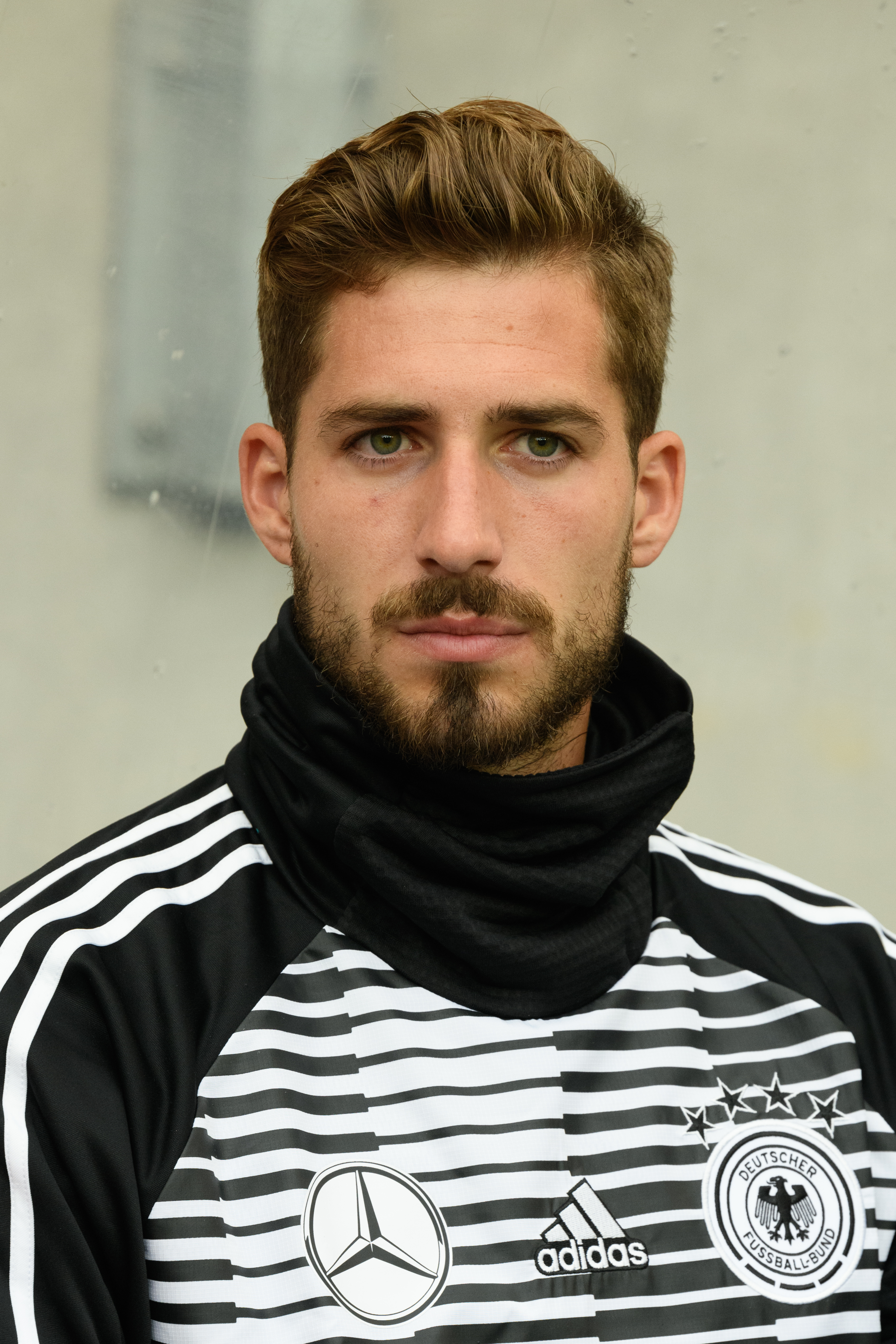
- Trapp with Germany in 2018

Personal information
- Full name: Kevin Christian Trapp
- Date of birth: 8 July 1990 (age 36)
- Place of birth: Merzig, West Germany
- Height: 1.89 m (6 ft 2 in)
- Position: Goalkeeper

Team information
- Current team: Paris FC
- Number: 1

Youth career
- 1997–2000: FC Brotdorf
- 2000–2003: SSV Bachem
- 2003–2005: SV Mettlach
- 2005–2008: 1. FC Kaiserslautern

Senior career*
Years	Team	Apps	(Gls)
2007–2011	1. FC Kaiserslautern II	51	(0)
2009–2012	1. FC Kaiserslautern	32	(0)
2012–2015	Eintracht Frankfurt	82	(0)
2015–2019	Paris Saint-Germain	63	(0)
2018–2019	→ Eintracht Frankfurt (loan)	33	(0)
2019–2025	Eintracht Frankfurt	178	(0)
2025–	Paris FC	32	(0)

International career^{‡}
2007–2008	Germany U18	4	(0)
2008–2009	Germany U19	6	(0)
2010–2013	Germany U21	11	(0)
2017–2023	Germany	9	(0)
Medal record
Men's football
Representing Germany
FIFA Confederations Cup
Winner	2017 Russia
FIFA U-17 World Cup
Third place	2007 South Korea
- * Club domestic league appearances and goals as of 23:16, 7 November 2026 (UTC) ‡ National team caps and goals as of 17:57, 22 November 2023 (UTC)

Kevin Christian Trapp (German pronunciation: [ˈkɛvɪn ˈtʁap]; born 8 July 1990) is a German professional footballer who plays as a goalkeeper for Ligue 1 club Paris FC.

Trapp began his professional career at 1. FC Kaiserslautern, where he took part in two Bundesliga seasons. In 2012, he signed for Eintracht Frankfurt for a fee of €1.5 million and played regularly over three years, also competing in the UEFA Europa League. He joined Paris Saint-Germain for an estimated €10 million in 2015, where he won several domestic honours. In 2018, he re-joined Eintracht Frankfurt on loan, before signing permanently the next season.

Trapp won 21 caps for Germany's youth teams, including 11 for the under-21s, and made his full debut in June 2017. He was part of their squad that won the 2017 FIFA Confederations Cup and also competed at the 2018 FIFA World Cup, UEFA Euro 2020 and the 2022 World Cup.

== Club career ==
=== 1. FC Kaiserslautern ===
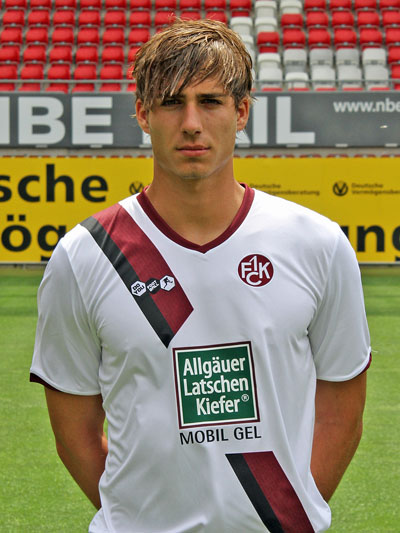
Trapp pictured at 1. FC Kaiserslautern's photo sessions ahead of the 2010–11 season

Born in Merzig, West Germany, Trapp began his football career at FC Brotdorf, joining at seven years old. He moved to neighbouring town, SSV Bachem aged twelve. After spending two years there, Trapp joined SV Mettlach. One day, he said in an interview on joining 1. FC Kaiserslautern, saying:

I told my coach I'd like to be down there on the pitch one day. I went home afterwards and from my own incentive, I looked up FC K and what opportunities they were offering. They were having trials. I wrote them an email explaining my situation and that I'd love to take part in the trials. I think it was September when I received a reply saying that it was currently not possible, however, that they would contact me in case the opportunity arose again. That is what they did a year later! 2003 or 2004. I was allowed to take part in the training sessions and from then on, everything took flight. I had the honour of being invited to play for the first team back when I was in the youth leagues due to the goalkeepers being off sick. SVV Bachum were already playing Youth Bundesliga. Kaiserslautern was also in that league. Therefore, when I got to play, it was a match against Kaiserslautern. I found out later as I was offered the contract that there were a bunch of coaches there watching the game. So, it wasn't just the email but also the performance!

Trapp started his professional career with 1. FC Kaiserslautern, where he progressed through the club's youth system. During his time at 1. FC Kaiserslautern, Trapp said he learned a lot from Gerald Ehrmann.

Trapp made his first appearance in the first team on 9 August 2008 in the 2008–09 DFB-Pokal round 1 against FC Carl Zeiss Jena, losing 2–1. It was announced on 21 July 2009 that he signed his first professional contract with the club, keeping him until 2013. Trapp made another appearance in the first team ten days later on 31 July 2009 in the 2009–10 DFB-Pokal round 1 against Eintracht Braunschweig, where he kept a clean sheet, in a 1–0. Over the next two seasons, Trapp was involved in the first team, appearing as the club's third choice goalkeeper and then second choice goalkeeper. At one point during the 2009–10 season, he suffered a shoulder injury that kept him out for three months. By January, Trapp made a recovery.

Since the start of the 2010–11 season, Trapp became the club's second goalkeeper for the side and was featured on the substitute bench. On 12 March 2011, with regular goalkeeper Tobias Sippel sidelined with influenza, he made his Bundesliga debut in a 2–1 home win over SC Freiburg. Competing with Sippel, Trapp played all eight remaining fixtures of the season. During which, he kept three clean sheets for the side, including two in a row between 23 April 2011 and 29 April 2011 against Schalke 04 and FC St. Pauli. At the end of the 2010–11 season, Trapp went on to make nine appearances in all competitions.

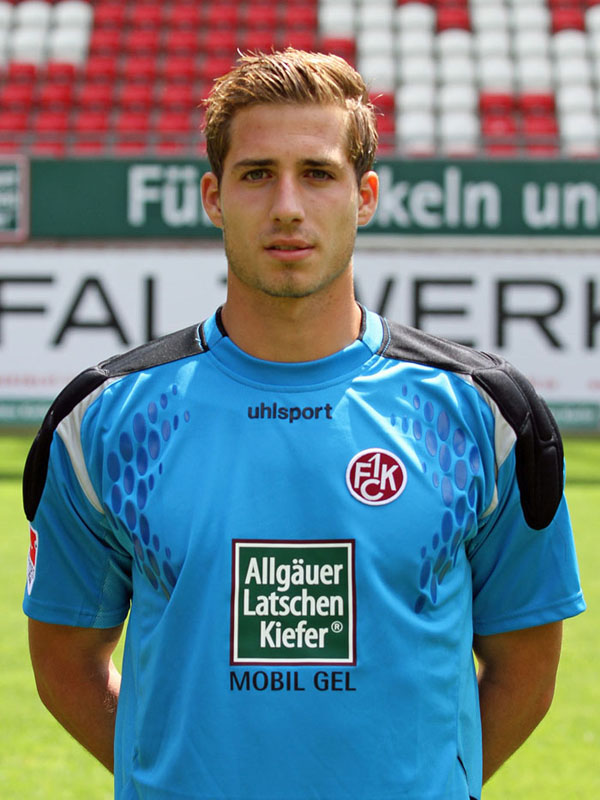
Trapp with Kaiserslautern during the 2011–12 season

Ahead of the 2011–12 season, Trapp was linked with a move to Schalke 04 but he ended up staying at the club. Following this, Trapp continued to be the club's first choice goalkeeper at the start of the season, beating out Sippel. His performance was praised by Manager Marco Kurz, who said: "Kevin once again proved his class in a very emotional, intense game and saved the point. Overall, it was a happy FCK point win after the entire 90 minutes, which is morally very valuable." Despite suffering from injury in late–October, Trapp continued to remain as the club's first choice goalkeeper. Along the way, he kept clean sheets for the side, both coming against SC Freiburg and Werder Bremen. However, in early–March, Trapp suffered a thigh injury and was sidelined for two matches. After returning from injury, he found himself on the substitute bench, as Sippel was the club's first choice goalkeeper for the rest of the 2011–12 season. As the season progressed, 1. FC Kaiserslautern was eventually relegated to 2.Bundesliga. At the end of the 2011–12 season, Trapp made twenty–six appearances in all competitions.

=== Eintracht Frankfurt ===
On 7 May 2012, Trapp left relegated Kaiserslautern and joined promoted Eintracht Frankfurt on a four-year contract for a fee of €1.5 million.

Trapp made his Eintracht Frankfurt debut, where he started the match, only to be sent–off in the 19th minute for a professional foul on Jakub Sylvestr, as the club lost 3–0 against Erzgebirge Aue in the first round of the DFB–Pokal. Despite this, Trapp made his league debut for the club, helping the side win 2–1 against Bayer Leverkusen in the opening game of the season. In a follow–up match against Hoffenheim, he kept his first clean sheet in his Eintracht Frankfurt's career, winning 4–0. Since joining the club, he quickly became a first choice goalkeeper for the side. The team had a good start to his first season, sitting in third place by November, and he received plaudits for his performances against leaders Bayern Munich despite losing 2–0. Manager Armin Veh praised Trapp's performance, saying: "Kevin has a great mentality, is totally on the ground. He's going to get even better." He then helped the club keep four clean sheets between 2 February 2013 and 10 March 2013. However, his campaign ended prematurely in March 2013, due to a hand injury while with the national under-21 team. Despite the injury, Trapp made twenty–seven appearances in all competitions and helped Eintracht Frankfurt finish sixth place in the league, therefore qualifying for the UEFA Europa League.

Having served a one match suspension for his red card last season, Trapp made his first appearance of the season against Hertha BSC in the opening game of the season and conceded six goals, as Eintracht Frankfurt lost 6–1. Since his return, he continued to regain his place as the club's first choice goalkeeper in the 2013–14 season. Trapp played in both legs of the UEFA Europa League Play–Offs against Qarabağ, helping the side win 4–1 on aggregate to qualify the Group Stage. He then helped Eintracht Frankfurt qualify to knockout stage of the UEFA Europa League Group Stage and helped the club earn four clean sheets along the way. However, the club reached the last 32, where they lost on away goals to FC Porto after a 5–5 aggregate draw. During a 5–0 loss against Bayern Munich on 2 February 2014, he suffered a bruise on his right tibia and was substituted in the 77th minute. Following a check, Trapp was given all clear and returned to the starting line–up against Eintracht Braunschweig on 8 February 2014, as he helped the side win 3–0. During the 2013–14 season, he saved four penalties, a record of his penalty saves in a season. At the end of the 2013–14 season, Trapp went on to make forty–six appearances in all competitions.

Ahead of the 2014–15 season, Trapp was linked with a move to Borussia Mönchengladbach as a replacement for Marc-André ter Stegen, but stayed at Eintracht Frankfurt. He also was given a captaincy by Manager Thomas Schaaf following the departure of Pirmin Schwegler. Trapp made a good start as a captain when he helped the side earn two wins and four draws. However, during a 2–2 draw against Mainz 05 on 24 September 2014, he suffered ankle injury at the last minutes and was sidelined for four months. It wasn't until on 31 January 2015 when Trapp returned to the starting line–up against Freiburg, as they lost 4–1. Following his return, he resumed his captain role, as well as, his first choice goalkeeper status. It was announced on 2 March 2015 that he signed a three–year contract with the club, keeping him until 2019. Since returning from injury, Trapp continued to regain his captaincy and his role as the club's first choice goalkeeper for the rest of the 2014–15 season. At the end of the 2014–15 season, he went on to make twenty–three appearances in all competitions.

=== Paris Saint-Germain ===
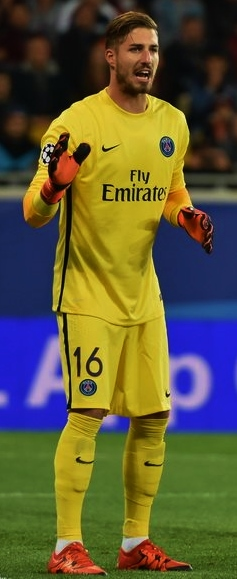
Trapp playing for champions Paris Saint-Germain in 2015

On 8 July 2015, Trapp signed a five-year deal with Ligue 1 champions Paris Saint-Germain for a fee of around €10 million, and was assigned the number 16 jersey.

Trapp made his debut on 1 August in the 2015 Trophée des Champions in Montreal, keeping a clean sheet in a 2–0 win over Lyon. He then kept four clean sheets in the first four league matches of the season. His five consecutive clean sheets ended when he conceded two goals, including a mistake that allowed Wahbi Khazri to capitalize the mistake, in a 2–2 draw against Bordeaux on 11 September 2015. Despite the mistakes, Trapp regained his first choice goalkeeper role and then made amends from his mistake against rivals, Marseille on 4 October 2015, making impressive saves, including saving a penalty from Abdelaziz Barrada, as PSG won 2–1. However, he suffered a hamstring injury while on international duty and missed one match as a result. Trapp returned to the starting line–up against Real Madrid in the UEFA Champions League match on 21 October 2015, starting the whole game, as he helped the side keep the match goalless, in a 0–0 draw.

Trapp went on to earn a total of four clean sheets, as PSG advanced to the UEFA Champions League Group Stage. Following this, he kept three consecutive clean sheets between 19 December 2015 and 16 January 2016 against SM Caen, Bastia and Toulouse. Trapp then played in both legs of the UEFA Champions League Round of 16 against Chelsea, as he helped the side win 4–2 to advance to the next round. During the 2015–16 season, Trapp overtook Salvatore Sirigu as PSG's first choice goalkeeper in the club's Ligue 1 and UEFA Champions League matches, while the Italian played in the Coupe de France and Coupe de la Ligue, as he helped the club win a domestic quadruple. At the end of the 2015–16 season, Trapp went on to make forty–six appearances in all competitions.

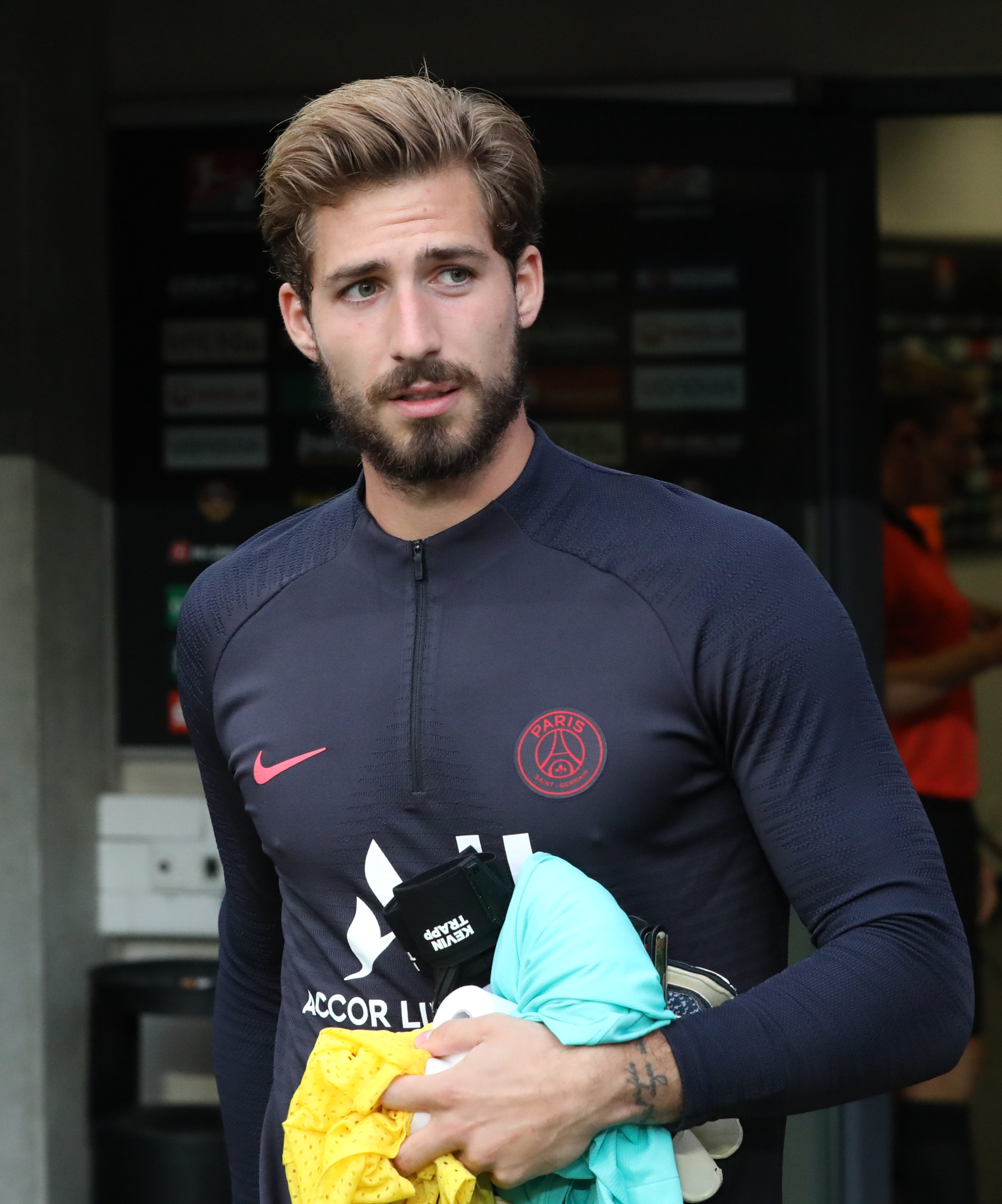
Trapp arriving at the stadium for Paris Saint-Germain in a friendly match against Dynamo Dresden on 17 July 2019

At the start of the 2016–17 season, Trapp was in goal as PSG won the 2016 Trophée des Champions in Austria, a 4–1 win on 6 August against Lyon again. Shortly after, he switched number shirt to number one. Despite being featured in the first four league matches of the season, Trapp was dropped in favour for youngster Alphonse Areola. Following Areola's injury, Trapp returned to the starting line–up for the next two matches, where he kept two clean sheets. But following Areola's poor performance, he returned to the starting line–up once again, coming against FC Lorient on 21 December 2016 and kept a clean sheet, as PSG won 5–0. This was followed up by keeping three consecutive clean sheets between 7 January 2017 and 21 January 2017. However, during a 1–1 draw against AS Monaco on 29 January 2017, Trapp suffered a muscle injury and was substituted in the 54th minute; he was sidelined for two weeks. He returned to the starting line–up two weeks later on 10 February 2017, keeping a clean sheet, in a 3–0 win against Bordeaux.

In a follow–up against Barcelona in the first leg of UEFA Champions League Round of 16, Trapp helped the side win 4–0, earning himself a clean sheet. After keeping another clean sheet against AS Nancy on 4 March 2017, Trapp said about the match against Barcelona in the second leg, saying: "We have to go to Barcelona as if it was our first match. We cannot say that we will have to (only) defend. It is not our game. We are to have possession, to control. We know that Barça is capable of doing many things. We had a very good first leg match (4-0). You have to do the same thing on your return. Because in front, they are able to score at any time, every minute. You will have to be very focused." However, in the second leg against FC Barcelona, Trapp conceded six goals, as the opposition made a comeback from 4–0 down and score six goals to send them through, eliminating PSG from the tournament. He later reflected in an interview, saying: "In Barcelona, it's complicated to say what happened. I believe that will never happen again. I do not think we were nervous. From the beginning, we found ourselves in danger, because of Barca's advanced players. We had never experienced such a tough match, with such pressure from the opponent, but there's still no excuse. It's just a game to forget, inexplicable, something that had never happened before. There were also refereeing decisions. I think all the factors were against us." In April the following month, he started in goal as PSG beat Monaco 4–1 to claim a record fourth straight Coupe de la Ligue title but was an unused substitute in a 1–0 win over Angers which saw PSG lift the Coupe de France title the following month. At the end of the 2016–17 season, Trapp went on to make thirty–one appearances in all competitions.

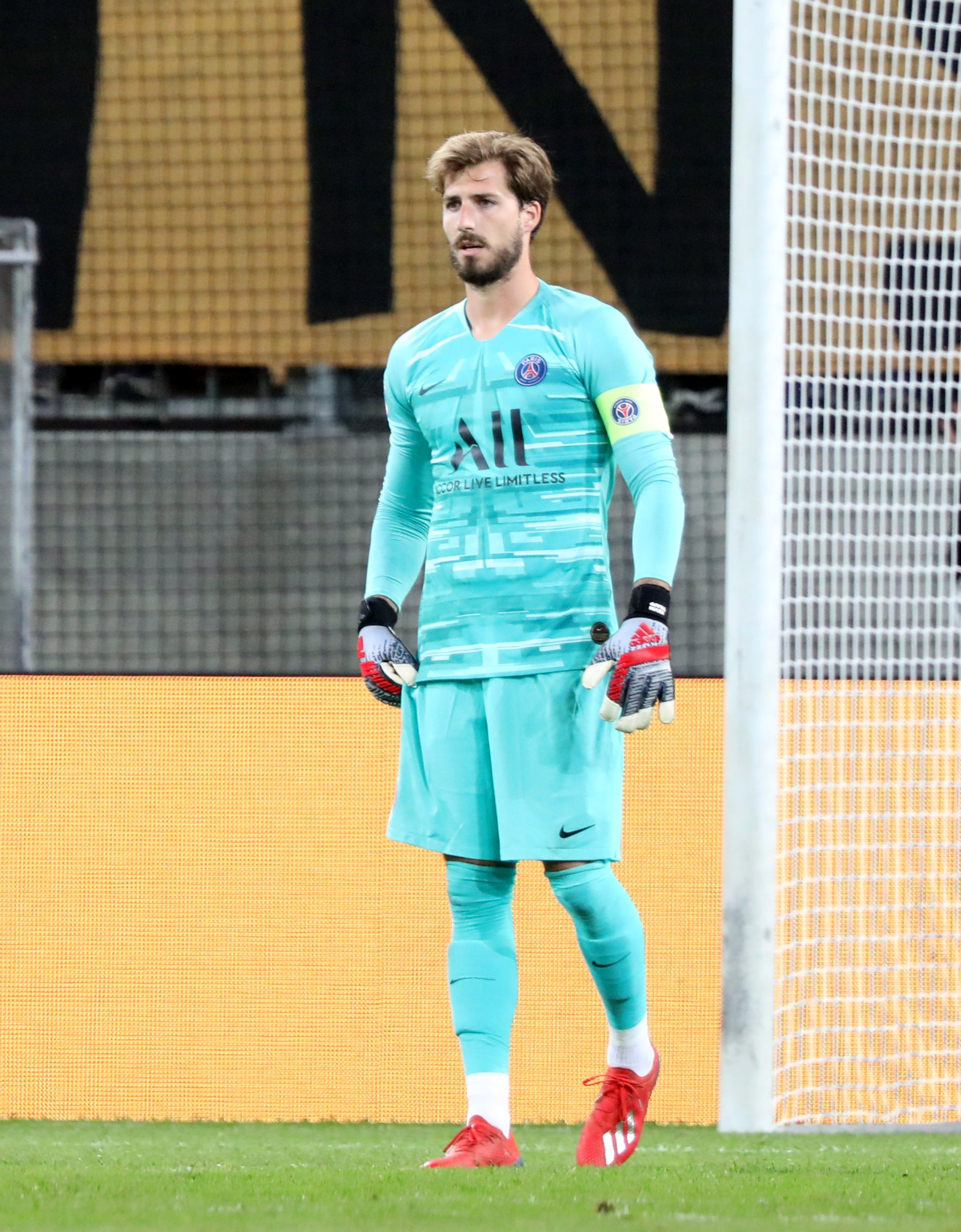
Trapp playing for Paris Saint-Germain in a friendly match against Dynamo Dresden on 17 July 2019

Ahead of the 2017–18 season, Trapp said in an interview with L’Equipe that he's expecting to compete against Areola for the first choice goalkeeper role once again. Since the start of the 2017–18 season, however, Manager Unai Emery began using Areola as the first choice goalkeeper in the league and UEFA Champions League, while Trapp played in the Coupe de France and Coupe de la Ligue. It wasn't until on 29 November 2017 when he made his first appearance of the season, starting the whole game, in a 2–0 against Troyes. A month later on 20 December 2017 when Trapp made his second league appearance of the season, in a 3–1 win against SM Caen. Trapp then helped PSG reach the final of Coupe de la Ligue after beating Rennes 3–2 in the semi–finals on 30 January 2018.

A week later on 7 February 2018, he was sent–off for receiving a straight red card in a last minutes, in a 4–1 win against Sochaux in the third round of the Coupe de France. After serving a two match suspension, Trapp didn't return to the starting line–up until a match against rivals, Marseille on 28 February 2018, where he kept a clean sheet, in a 3–0 win. On 31 March 2018, in a repeat of the previous season's final, Trapp started in goal as PSG retained the Coupe de la Ligue title with a 3–0 win over Monaco. On 8 May 2018, he played in 2018 Coupe de France Final as PSG won 2–0 against Les Herbiers to clinch the trophy. At the end of the 2017–18 season, Trapp went on to make fourteen appearances in all competitions.

=== Return to Eintracht Frankfurt ===
On 31 August 2018, Trapp returned to Eintracht Frankfurt on loan for the 2018–19 season. Upon joining the club, he received a number thirty–one shirt for the side.

Trapp made his second Eintracht Frankfurt debut, where he started the whole game, in a 2–1 loss against Werder Bremen the following day. Since making his debut for the club, Trapp quickly regained his first choice goalkeeper role. He then helped the side two consecutive clean sheets between 2 November 2018 and 11 November 2018 against Stuttgart and Schalke 04. Following a 2–1 loss against VfL Wolfsburg on 2 December 2018, Trapp made a comment about Sascha Stegemann, resulting in him being fined 8,000 euros. Throughout March, he kept five clean sheets in all competitions, including a 2–0 aggregate win against Inter Milan in the UEFA Europa League Round of 16. Trapp then played in both legs of the UEFA Europa League semi–finals against Chelsea; although he saved one penalty from César Azpilicueta in the shootout, they lost 5–4 as a result.

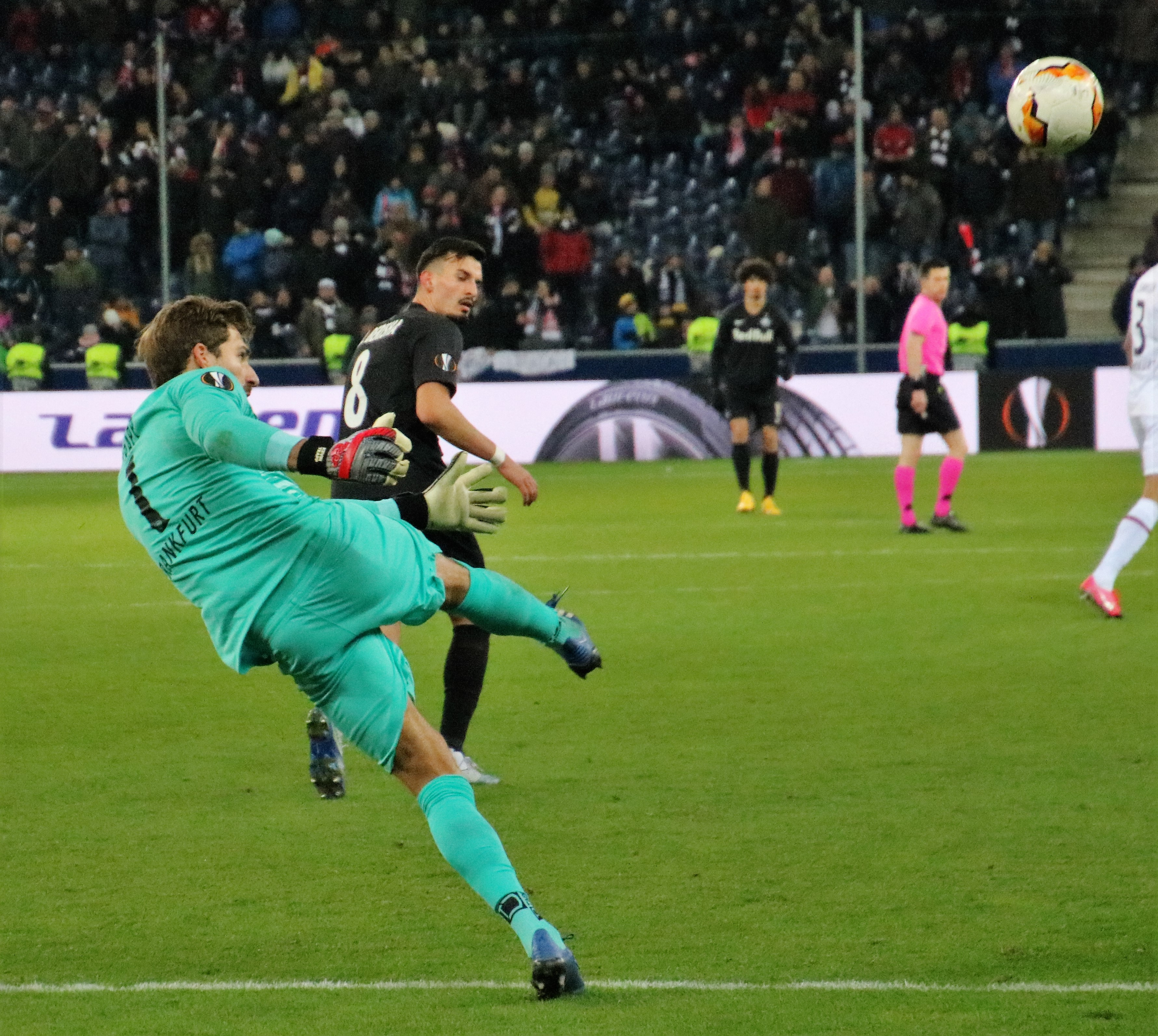
Trapp taking a kick during a UEFA Europa League match against Red Bull Salzburg

After a successful loan spell, Trapp re-signed with Eintracht Frankfurt on 7 August 2019 on a five-year deal worth €7 million. Trapp's first game after signing for the club on a permanent basis came in the opening game of the season against Hoffenheim, where he kept a clean sheet, in a 1–0 win. Trapp then played in both legs of the UEFA Europa League Play–Off Round against RC Strasbourg, as he helped the side win 3–1 on aggregate to send them through to the Group Stage. However, during a 2–1 win against Union Berlin on 27 September 2019, Trapp suffered a shoulder injury that kept him for the rest of 2019. It wasn't until on 18 January 2020 when he returned to the starting line–up, in a 2–1 win against Hoffenheim. Since returning from injury, Trapp regained his place as the club's first choice goalkeeper for the rest of the 2019–20 season. His return was praised by the German and the club's manager Adi Hütter. Despite the season being suspended due to the COVID-19 pandemic, he finished the 2019–20 season, making 34 appearances in all competitions.

Frankfurt won the UEFA Europa League on 18 May 2022, with Trapp playing a crucial role in the victory. He made a point blank save in the last minute of extra time from Ryan Kent, before saving a penalty kick from Aaron Ramsey helping his team win the trophy.

=== Paris FC ===
On 19 August 2025, Trapp joined recently-promoted Ligue 1 side Paris FC on a three-year deal.

== International career ==
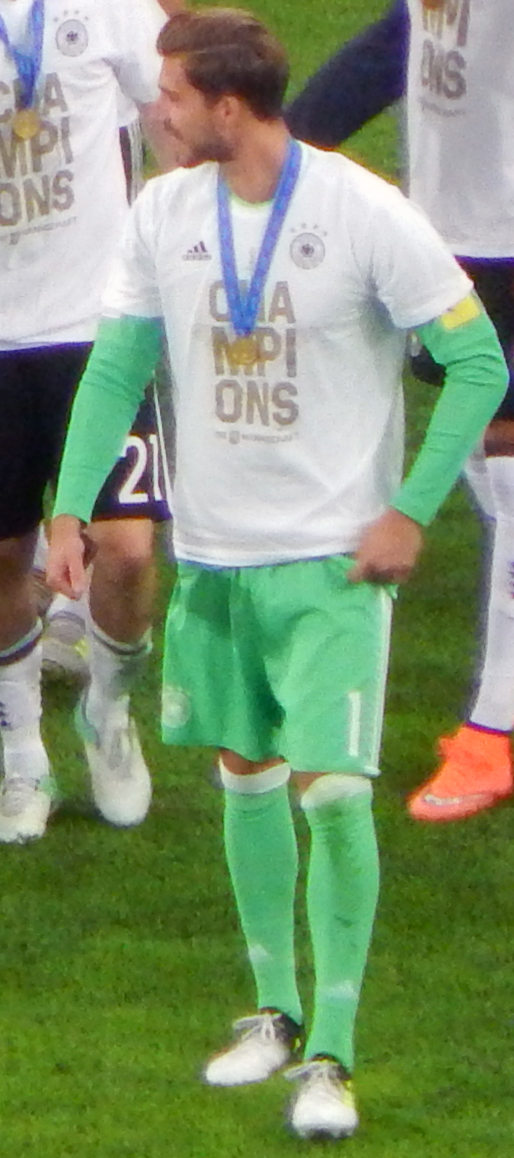
Trapp receiving a medal following Germany's win in the FIFA Confederations Cup

=== Youth career ===
Trapp was a member of several German youth national teams, and was first called up to the Germany U17 team, appearing as an unused substitute throughout the national side's FIFA U-17 World Cup tournament, as they finished third place.

After the tournament ended, Trapp was called up to the Germany U18 and made his Germany U18 debut, starting the whole game, in a 3–1 win against Rwanda U18. He then made three more appearances for the U18 side, including two clean sheets.

Trapp was called up to Germany U19 squad and made his Germany U19 debut, starting the whole game, in a 2–1 loss against Czech Republic U19 on 7 September 2008. He then helped the U19 squad qualify for the UEFA European Under-19 Championship next round after winning three matches in the Group Stage 6. Trapp went on to make six appearances for the U19 side.

Trapp was called up to Germany U21 squad for the first time on 31 August 2010. He made his Germany U21 debut on 7 September 2010, starting the whole game, in a 3–0 win against Northern Ireland U21 and keeping a clean sheet in a process. Trapp then kept three consecutive clean sheets during the UEFA European Under-21 Championship qualification, coming against San Marino U21, Belarus U21 and Bosnia and Herzegovina U21. After being almost two years away from the Germany U21 side, he returned to the starting line–up, as they lost 1–0 against Italy U21 on 6 February 2013. Trapp made a total of 11 appearances for the U21 side.

=== Senior career ===
Trapp was first called up to the senior team for the UEFA Euro 2016 qualifying match against Gibraltar on 13 June 2015. He continued to remain on the substitute bench for the next two years.

Trapp made his international debut on 6 June 2017 in a 1–1 friendly draw away to Denmark, playing the full 90 minutes. He was selected for the 2017 FIFA Confederations Cup in Russia later that month, which his country won, but he did not play any match. Trapp made two more appearances for Germany, coming against France and Brazil.

On 4 June 2018, Trapp was selected in Germany's final 23-man squad for the 2018 FIFA World Cup as a third-choice goalkeeper behind Manuel Neuer and Marc-André ter Stegen. He was unused in a group-stage exit for the defending champions. On 19 May 2021, he was selected to the squad for UEFA Euro 2020 in the similar role.

== Personal life ==
Trapp was born in Merzig, Saarland and stayed in the city until 2004. Trapp said in an interview that he idolised Oliver Kahn. Trapp attended Peter-Wust-Gymnasium.

He became engaged to Brazilian model Izabel Goulart in July 2018. In addition to speaking German, Trapp speaks five other languages: Portuguese, Spanish, English, French and basic Italian.

== Career statistics ==
=== Club ===
As of match played 22 November 2026

Appearances and goals by club, season and competition
Club	Season	League			National cup (Note: Includes DFB-Pokal, Coupe de France)		League cup (Note: Includes Coupe de la Ligue)		Europe		Other		Total	
Club	Season	Division	Apps	Goals	Apps	Goals	Apps	Goals	Apps	Goals	Apps	Goals	Apps	Goals
1. FC Kaiserslautern II	2007–08	Oberliga Südwest	12	0	—		—		—		—		12	0
1. FC Kaiserslautern II	2008–09	Regionalliga West	19	0	—		—		—		—		19	0
1. FC Kaiserslautern II	2009–10	Regionalliga West	15	0	—		—		—		—		15	0
1. FC Kaiserslautern II	2010–11	Regionalliga West	4	0	—		—		—		—		4	0
1. FC Kaiserslautern II	2011–12	Regionalliga West	1	0	—		—		—		—		1	0
1. FC Kaiserslautern II	Total		51	0	—		—		—		—		51	0
1. FC Kaiserslautern	2008–09	2. Bundesliga	0	0	1	0	—		—		—		1	0
1. FC Kaiserslautern	2009–10	2. Bundesliga	0	0	1	0	—		—		—		1	0
1. FC Kaiserslautern	2010–11	Bundesliga	9	0	0	0	—		—		—		9	0
1. FC Kaiserslautern	2011–12	Bundesliga	23	0	3	0	—		—		—		26	0
1. FC Kaiserslautern	Total		32	0	5	0	—		—		—		37	0
Eintracht Frankfurt	2012–13	Bundesliga	26	0	1	0	—		—		—		27	0
Eintracht Frankfurt	2013–14	Bundesliga	34	0	3	0	—		9 (Note: Appearances in UEFA Europa League)	0	—		46	0
Eintracht Frankfurt	2014–15	Bundesliga	22	0	1	0	—		—		—		23	0
Eintracht Frankfurt	Total		82	0	5	0	—		9	0	—		96	0
Paris Saint-Germain	2015–16	Ligue 1	35	0	0	0	0	0	10 (Note: Appearances in UEFA Champions League)	0	1 (Note: Appearance in Trophée des Champions)	0	46	0
Paris Saint-Germain	2016–17	Ligue 1	24	0	1	0	3	0	2	0	1	0	31	0
Paris Saint-Germain	2017–18	Ligue 1	4	0	6	0	4	0	0	0	0	0	14	0
Paris Saint-Germain	Total		63	0	7	0	7	0	12	0	2	0	91	0
Eintracht Frankfurt (loan)	2018–19	Bundesliga	33	0	0	0	—		12	0	0	0	45	0
Eintracht Frankfurt	2019–20	Bundesliga	22	0	4	0	—		8	0	—		34	0
Eintracht Frankfurt	2020–21	Bundesliga	33	0	2	0	—		—		—		35	0
Eintracht Frankfurt	2021–22	Bundesliga	32	0	1	0	—		13	0	—		46	0
Eintracht Frankfurt	2022–23	Bundesliga	33	0	6	0	—		8	0	1 (Note: Appearance in UEFA Super Cup)	0	48	0
Eintracht Frankfurt	2023–24	Bundesliga	32	0	2	0	—		9 (Note: Appearances in UEFA Europa Conference League)	0	—		43	0
Eintracht Frankfurt	2024–25	Bundesliga	26	0	3	0	—		7	0	—		36	0
Eintracht Frankfurt	Total		211	0	18	0	—		57	0	1	0	287	0
Paris FC	2025–26	Ligue 1	22	0	0	0	—		—		—		22	0
Paris FC	2026–27	Ligue 1	10	0	0	0	—		—		—		10	0
Paris FC	Total		32	0	0	0	—		—		—		32	0
Career total			471	0	35	0	7	0	78	0	3	0	594	0

=== International ===
As of match played 21 November 2023

Appearances and goals by national team and year
National team	Year	Apps	Goals
Germany
Germany	2017	2	0
Germany	2018	1	0
Germany	2019	0	0
Germany	2020	2	0
Germany	2021	0	0
Germany	2022	1	0
Germany	2023	3	0
Total		9	0

== Honours ==
1. FC Kaiserslautern

- 2. Bundesliga: 2009–10

Paris Saint-Germain

- Ligue 1: 2015–16, 2017–18
- Coupe de France: 2016–17, 2017–18
- Coupe de la Ligue: 2016–17, 2017–18
- Trophée des Champions: 2015, 2016, 2017, 2018, 2019

Eintracht Frankfurt

- UEFA Europa League: 2021–22
- DFB-Pokal runner-up: 2022–23

Germany

- FIFA Confederations Cup: 2017

Individual

- UEFA Europa League Squad of the Season: 2018–19
- UEFA Europa League Team of the Season: 2021–22
- Bundesliga Team of the Season: 2018–19
