= 2017–18 Paris Saint-Germain FC season =

48th season in existence of Paris Saint-Germain

Paris Saint-Germain
2017–18 season
- President: Nasser Al-Khelaifi
- Head coach: Unai Emery
- Stadium: Parc des Princes
- Ligue 1: 1st
- Coupe de France: Winners
- Coupe de la Ligue: Winners
- Trophée des Champions: Winners
- UEFA Champions League: Round of 16
- Top goalscorer: League: Edinson Cavani (28); All: Edinson Cavani (40)
- Highest home attendance: 47,759 (vs. Guingamp – 29 April 2018)
- Lowest home attendance: 40,920 (vs. Troyes – 29 November 2017)
- Average home league attendance: 46,862
Home colours	Away colours	Third colours

The 2017–18 season was Paris Saint-Germain Football Club's 45th professional season since its creation in 1970, and its 44th consecutive season in the top-flight of French football. They broke the world transfer record by acquiring Neymar for a world record fee of €222 million.

The season was the first since 2011–12 without Maxwell, who retired after the 2016–17 season.

== Players ==
French teams are limited to four players without EU citizenship. Hence, the squad list includes only the principal nationality of each player; several non-European players on the squad have dual citizenship with an EU country. Also, players from the ACP countries—countries in Africa, the Caribbean, and the Pacific that are signatories to the Cotonou Agreement—are not counted against non-EU quotas due to the Kolpak ruling.

=== Current squad ===
As of 31 January 2018

Note: Flags indicate national team as defined under FIFA eligibility rules; some limited exceptions apply. Players may hold more than one non-FIFA nationality.

No.	Pos.	Nation	Player
1	GK	GER	Kevin Trapp
2	DF	BRA	Thiago Silva (captain)
3	DF	FRA	Presnel Kimpembe
5	DF	BRA	Marquinhos (3rd captain)
6	MF	ITA	Marco Verratti
8	MF	ITA	Thiago Motta (vice-captain)
9	FW	URU	Edinson Cavani
10	FW	BRA	Neymar
11	MF	ARG	Ángel Di María
12	DF	BEL	Thomas Meunier
16	GK	FRA	Alphonse Areola
17	DF	ESP	Yuri Berchiche

No.	Pos.	Nation	Player
18	MF	ARG	Giovani Lo Celso
19	MF	FRA	Lassana Diarra
20	DF	FRA	Layvin Kurzawa
21	FW	FRA	Hatem Ben Arfa
23	MF	GER	Julian Draxler
24	MF	FRA	Christopher Nkunku
25	MF	FRA	Adrien Rabiot
27	MF	ARG	Javier Pastore
29	FW	FRA	Kylian Mbappé (on loan from Monaco)
32	DF	BRA	Dani Alves
40	GK	FRA	Sébastien Cibois

== Transfers ==
=== In ===
For Recent transfers see List of French football transfers summer 2017

No.	Pos	Player	Transferred from	Fee	Date	Source
17	DF	(Spain) Yuri Berchiche	(Spain) Real Sociedad	€16,000,000	7 July 2017	
32	DF	(Brazil) Dani Alves	Juventus	Free transfer	12 Jul 2017	
10	FW	(Brazil) Neymar	(Spain) Barcelona	€222,000,000	3 Aug 2017	
29	FW	(France) Kylian Mbappé	(France) Monaco	Loan	31 Aug 2017	
19	MF	(France) Lassana Diarra	Unattached	Free transfer	23 Jan 2018	

=== Out ===
No.	Pos	Player	Transferred To	Fee	Date	Source
17	DF	(Brazil) Maxwell	Retired	N/A	1 July 2017	
29	FW	(France) Jean-Kévin Augustin	(Germany) RB Leipzig	€13,000,000	6 July 2017	
14	MF	(France) Blaise Matuidi	(Italy) Juventus	€20,000,000	18 August 2017	
19	DF	(Ivory Coast) Serge Aurier	(England) Tottenham Hotspur	€23,000,000	31 August 2017	
4	MF	(Poland) Grzegorz Krychowiak	(England) West Bromwich Albion	Loan	31 August 2017	
37	FW	(France) Odsonne Édouard	(Scotland) Celtic	Loan	31 August 2017	
15	FW	(Portugal) Gonçalo Guedes	(Spain) Valencia	Loan	2 September 2017	
40	GK	(France) Rémy Descamps	(France) Tours	Loan	2 January 2018	
31	DF	(France) Alec Georgen	(Netherlands) AZ	Loan	31 January 2018	
7	FW	(Brazil) Lucas Moura	(England) Tottenham Hotspur	€28,000,000	31 January 2018	

== Pre-season and friendlies ==
14 July 2017 Friendly	Paris Saint-Germain	1–1	Paris FC	Saint-Germain-en-Laye, France
11:00 CEST (UTC+2)	Pastore 59'		Cissé 80'	Stadium: Camp des Loges

=== International Champions Cup ===
19 July 2017 Match 1	Roma	1–1 (3–5 p)	Paris Saint-Germain	Detroit, United States
20:00 PDT (UTC−4)	Sadiq 60'; Seck (yellow card) 88'	Report	Rabiot (yellow card) 18'; Marquinhos 36', (yellow card) 62'	Stadium: Comerica Park; Attendance: 36,289; Referee: Chris Penso (United States)
	Penalties
	Peres (penalty scored); Nainggolan (penalty scored); Gerson (penalty missed); De Rossi (penalty scored)		(penalty scored) Moura; (penalty scored) Nkunku; (penalty scored) Callegari; (penalty scored) Édouard; (penalty scored) Marquinhos

22 July 2017 Match 2	Paris Saint-Germain	2–4	Tottenham Hotspur	Orlando, United States
20:00 PDT (UTC−4)	Cavani 6'; Pastore 36'; Trapp (red card) 46'; Jesé (yellow card) 59'	Report	Eriksen 11'; Dier 18'; Alderweireld (yellow card) 70', (goal) 82'; Kane 88' (pen.)	Stadium: Camping World Stadium; Attendance: 33,322; Referee: Ted Unkel (United States)

26 July 2017 Match 3	Paris Saint-Germain	2–3	Juventus	Miami Gardens, United States
20:30 PDT (UTC−4)	Verratti (yellow card) 29'; Guedes 53'; Alves (yellow card) 60'; Pastore 80'	Report	Bentancur (yellow card) 23'; Higuaín 45'; Marchisio 62', 89' (pen.)	Stadium: Hard Rock Stadium; Attendance: 44,444; Referee: Ted Unkel (United States)

== Competitions ==
=== Overview ===
Competition	First match	Last match	Starting round	Final position	Record							
Competition	First match	Last match	Starting round	Final position	Pld	W	D	L	GF	GA	GD	Win %
Ligue 1	5 August 2017	19 May 2018	Matchday 1	Winners	38	29	6	3	108	29	+79	76.32
Coupe de France	7 January 2018	8 May 2018	Round of 64	Winners	6	6	0	0	22	5	+17	100.00
Coupe de la Ligue	13 December 2017	31 March 2018	Round of 16	Winners	4	4	0	0	12	4	+8	100.00
Trophée des Champions	29 July 2017		Final	Winners	1	1	0	0	2	1	+1	100.00
Champions League	12 September 2017	6 March 2018	Group stage	Round of 16	8	5	0	3	27	9	+18	62.50
Total					57	45	6	6	171	48	+123	78.95

Last updated: 19 May 2018.
Source: Competitions

=== Trophée des Champions ===
29 July 2017	Monaco	1–2	Paris Saint-Germain	Tangier, Morocco
20:00 WEST (UTC+1)	Sidibé 30', (yellow card) 50'; Glik (yellow card) 53'; Fabinho (yellow card) 82'	Report	Dani Alves 51'; Rabiot 63'; Verratti (yellow card) 82'	Stadium: Grand Stade de Tanger; Attendance: 43,761; Referee: Noureddine El Jaafari (Morocco)

=== Ligue 1 ===
==== League table ====
Pos	Team	Pld	W	D	L	GF	GA	GD	Pts	Qualification or relegation
1	Paris Saint-Germain (C)	38	29	6	3	108	29	+79	93	Qualification for the Champions League group stage
2	Monaco	38	24	8	6	85	45	+40	80	Qualification for the Champions League group stage
3	Lyon	38	23	9	6	87	43	+44	78	Qualification for the Champions League group stage
4	Marseille	38	22	11	5	80	47	+33	77	Qualification for the Europa League group stage (Note: Since the winners of the 2017–18 Coupe de France and the 2017–18 Coupe de la Ligue, Paris Saint-Germain, qualified for European competition based on league position, the spot awarded to the Coupe de France winners (Europa League group stage) was passed to the fourth-placed team and the spot awarded to the Coupe de la Ligue winners (Europa League third qualifying round) was passed to the sixth-placed team. The fifth-placed team received the spot in Europa League third qualifying round originally designated to the fourth-placed team.)
5	Rennes	38	16	10	12	50	44	+6	58	Qualification for the Europa League group stage

Source: Ligue 1 and Soccerway
Rules for classification: 1) Points; 2) Goal difference; 3) Head-to-head points; 4) Head-to-head goal difference; 5) Head-to-head goals scored; 6) Head-to-head away goals; 7) Goals scored; 8) Away goals scored; 9) Most goals scored in one league match; 10) Fair-play points
(C) Champions

==== Results summary ====
Overall								Home						Away					
Pld	W	D	L	GF	GA	GD	Pts	W	D	L	GF	GA	GD	W	D	L	GF	GA	GD
38	29	6	3	108	29	+79	93	17	1	1	70	15	+55	12	5	2	38	14	+24

Last updated: 19 May 2018.
Source: Ligue1

==== Results by round ====
Round	1	2	3	4	5	6	7	8	9	10	11	12	13	14	15	16	17	18	19	20	21	22	23	24	25	26	27	28	29	30	31	32	33	34	35	36	37	38
Ground	H	A	H	H	A	H	A	H	A	A	H	A	H	A	H	A	H	A	H	A	H	A	H	A	A	H	H	A	H	A	H	A	H	A	H	A	H	A
Result	W	W	W	W	W	W	D	W	W	D	W	W	W	W	W	L	W	W	W	W	W	L	W	W	W	W	W	W	W	W	W	D	W	W	D	D	L	D
Position	5	2	1	1	1	1	1	1	1	1	1	1	1	1	1	1	1	1	1	1	1	1	1	1	1	1	1	1	1	1	1	1	1	1	1	1	1	1

Source: Matches
A = Away; H = Home; W = Win; D = Draw; L = Loss

==== Matches ====
5 August 2017 1	Paris Saint-Germain	2–0	Amiens	Paris
17:15 CEST (UTC+2)	Cavani 42'; Pastore 81'	Report	Fofana (yellow card) 69'	Stadium: Parc des Princes; Attendance: 46,989; Referee: Mikael Lesage

13 August 2017 2	Guingamp	0–3	Paris Saint-Germain	Guingamp
21:00 CEST (UTC+2)	Ikoko (yellow card) 11'; Deaux (yellow card) 77'	Report	Motta (yellow card) 32'; Ikoko 52' (o.g.); Cavani 62'; Verratti (yellow card) 67'; Neymar 82'	Stadium: Stade de Roudourou; Attendance: 18,378; Referee: Antony Gautier

20 August 2017 3	Paris Saint-Germain	6–2	Toulouse	Paris
21:00 CEST (UTC+2)	Neymar 31', 90+2'; Rabiot 35'; Verratti (yellow card) 37' (yellow-red card) 69'; Cavani 75' (pen.); Pastore 82'; Kurzawa 84'	Report	Gradel 18'; Diop (yellow card) 54'; Blin (yellow card) 67'; Thiago Silva 78' (o.g.); Michelin (yellow card) 81'; Jean (yellow card) 90'	Stadium: Parc des Princes; Attendance: 47,221; Referee: Amaury Delerue

25 August 2017 4	Paris Saint-Germain	3–0	Saint-Étienne	Paris
20:45 CEST (UTC+2)	Cavani 20' (pen.), 89'; Meunier (yellow card) 39'; Kimpembe (yellow card) 45+1'; Motta 50'	Report	Janko (yellow card) 19'; Théophile-Catherine (yellow card) 50'; Tannane (yellow card) 86'	Stadium: Parc des Princes; Attendance: 46,957; Referee: Clément Turpin

8 September 2017 5	Metz	1–5	Paris Saint-Germain	Metz
20:45 CEST (UTC+2)	Rivière 37'; Assou-Ekotto (red card) 56'	Report	Cavani 31', 74'; Draxler (yellow card) 41'; Mbappé 59'; Neymar 69'; Lucas 88'	Stadium: Stade Saint-Symphorien; Attendance: 25,015; Referee: Sébastien Desiage

17 September 2017 6	Paris Saint-Germain	2–0	Lyon	Paris
21:00 CEST (UTC+2)	Motta (yellow card) 45'; Marcelo 75' (o.g.); Neymar (yellow card) 76'; Thiago Silva (yellow card) 81'; Morel 86' (o.g.)	Report	Fekir (yellow card) 55'; Mendy (yellow card) 79'	Stadium: Parc des Princes; Attendance: 47,191; Referee: Ruddy Buquet

23 September 2017 7	Montpellier	0–0	Paris Saint-Germain	Montpellier
17:00 CEST (UTC+2)	Ninga (yellow card) 31'; Mendes (yellow card) 41'	Report	Marquinhos (yellow card) 12'; Lucas (yellow card) 75'	Stadium: Stade de la Mosson; Attendance: 20,975; Referee: Clément Turpin

30 September 2017 8	Paris Saint-Germain	6–2	Bordeaux	Paris
17:00 CEST (UTC+2)	Neymar 5', 40' (pen.); Cavani 12'; Meunier 21', (yellow card) 45+1'; Draxler 45'; Mbappé 58'	Report	Sankharé 31', (yellow card) 64'; Jovanović (yellow card) 39'; Malcom 90' (pen.)	Stadium: Parc des Princes; Attendance: 47,537; Referee: François Letexier

14 October 2017 9	Dijon	1–2	Paris Saint-Germain	Dijon
17:00 CEST (UTC+2)	Sliti (yellow card) 42'; Rosier (yellow card) 50'; Jeannot 87', (yellow card) 87'	Report	Neymar (yellow card) 40'; Kimpembe (yellow card) 48'; Dani Alves (yellow card) 52'; Meunier 71', 90+2'; Rabiot (yellow card) 75'	Stadium: Stade Gaston Gérard; Attendance: 15,160; Referee: Jerome Miguelgorry

22 October 2017 10	Marseille	2–2	Paris Saint-Germain	Marseille
21:00 CEST (UTC+2)	Luiz Gustavo 16'; Mitroglou (yellow card) 45'; Sakai (yellow card) 52'; Thauvin 78'; Ocampos (yellow card) 87'; Sanson (yellow card) 90'	Report	Neymar 33', (yellow card) 85' (yellow-red card) 87'; Mbappé (yellow card) 54'; Cavani 90+3'	Stadium: Stade Vélodrome; Attendance: 60,410; Referee: Ruddy Buquet

27 October 2017 11	Paris Saint-Germain	3–0	Nice	Paris
20:45 CEST (UTC+2)	Cavani 3', 31'; Dante 52' (o.g.)	Report		Stadium: Parc des Princes; Attendance: 47,224; Referee: Tony Chapron

4 November 2017 12	Angers	0–5	Paris Saint-Germain	Angers
17:00 CET (UTC+1)	Sunu (yellow card) 40'	Report	Mbappé 5', 84', (yellow card) 75'; Draxler 14'; Cavani 30', 60'; Verratti (yellow card) 80'; Kimpembe (yellow card) 90+1'	Stadium: Stade Raymond Kopa; Attendance: 12,381; Referee: Benoît Bastien

18 November 2017 13	Paris Saint-Germain	4–1	Nantes	Paris
17:00 CET (UTC+1)	Cavani 38', 79'; Di María 42'; Berchiche (yellow card) 49'; Pastore 65'; Verratti (yellow card) 74'	Report	Pallois (yellow card) 49'; Nakoulma 60'; Awaziem (yellow card) 63'; Djidji (yellow card) 65'	Stadium: Parc des Princes; Attendance: 47,680; Referee: Nicolas Rainville

26 November 2017 14	Monaco	1–2	Paris Saint-Germain	Fontvieille
21:00 CET (UTC+1)	Jorge (yellow card) 9'; Jemerson (yellow card) 30'; Touré (yellow card) 51'; Moutinho 81'	Report	Cavani 19'; Kurzawa (yellow card) 25'; Neymar (yellow card) 45', (goal) 52' (pen.); Dani Alves (yellow card) 90'; Berchiche (yellow card) 90+2'	Stadium: Stade Louis II; Attendance: 16,588; Referee: François Letexier

29 November 2017 15	Paris Saint-Germain	2–0	Troyes	Paris
21:00 CET (UTC+1)	Neymar 73'; Cavani 90'	Report	Niane (yellow card) 59'	Stadium: Parc des Princes; Attendance: 40,920; Referee: Jérôme Brisard

2 December 2017 16	Strasbourg	2–1	Paris Saint-Germain	Strasbourg
17:00 CET (UTC+1)	Costa 13', (yellow card) 50'; Bahoken 65'; Saadi (yellow card) 90+2'; Liénard (yellow card) 90+2'; Martin (yellow card) 90+8'	Report	Mbappé 42'; Berchiche (yellow card) 44'; Neymar (yellow card) 90+6'; Kimpembe (yellow card) 90+8'	Stadium: Stade de la Meinau; Attendance: 25,327; Referee: Ruddy Buquet

9 December 2017 17	Paris Saint-Germain	3–1	Lille	Paris
17:00 CET (UTC+1)	Di María 28'; Pastore 49'; Verratti (yellow card) 66'; Dani Alves (yellow card) 75'; Mbappé 90+2'	Report	Benzia (yellow card) 78'; El Ghazi 86'; Ié (yellow card) 90+3'	Stadium: Parc des Princes; Attendance: 47,176; Referee: Johan Hamel

16 December 2017 18	Rennes	1–4	Paris Saint-Germain	Rennes
17:00 CET (UTC+1)	Traoré (yellow card) 32'; Mubele 53'; André (yellow card) 54' (yellow-red card) 63'; Khazri (yellow card) 78'	Report	Neymar 4', 76'; Mbappé 17'; Kimpembe (yellow card) 42' (yellow-red card) 89'; Lo Celso (yellow card) 73'; Cavani 75'	Stadium: Roazhon Park; Attendance: 29,194; Referee: Antony Gautier

20 December 2017 19	Paris Saint-Germain	3–1	Caen	Paris
20:50 CET (UTC+1)	Berchiche (yellow card) 19', (goal) 81'; Cavani 21'; Mbappé 57'; Thiago Silva (yellow card) 90'	Report	Peeters (yellow card) 13'; Delaplace (yellow card) 36'; Santini 90' (pen.)	Stadium: Parc des Princes; Attendance: 47,490; Referee: Karim Abed

14 January 2018 20	Nantes	0–1	Paris Saint-Germain	Nantes
21:00 CET (UTC+1)	Diego Carlos (yellow card) 30' (yellow-red card) 90+1'; Pallois (yellow card) 41'	Report	Di María 12'; Verratti (yellow card) 15'; Dani Alves (yellow card) 60'	Stadium: Stade de la Beaujoire; Attendance: 34,486; Referee: Tony Chapron

17 January 2018 21	Paris Saint-Germain	8–0	Dijon	Paris
21:00 CET (UTC+1)	Di María 4', 15'; Cavani 21'; Neymar 42', 57', 73', 83' (pen.); Mbappé 77'	Report	Massouema (yellow card) 63'	Stadium: Parc des Princes; Attendance: 47,483; Referee: Olivier Thual

21 January 2018 22	Lyon	2–1	Paris Saint-Germain	Décines-Charpieu
21:00 CET (UTC+1)	Fekir 2'; Mendy (yellow card) 60'; Depay 90+5', (yellow card) 90+5'	Report	Kurzawa 45+3'; Lo Celso (yellow card) 53'; Dani Alves (red card) 57'; Verratti (yellow card) 77'; Cavani (yellow card) 80'	Stadium: Parc Olympique Lyonnais; Attendance: 57,582; Referee: Clément Turpin

27 January 2018 23	Paris Saint-Germain	4–0	Montpellier	Paris
17:00 CET (UTC+1)	Cavani 11', (yellow card) 12'; Neymar 40' (pen.), 82'; Di María 70'	Report	Mendes (yellow card) 39'; Skhiri (yellow card) 55'	Stadium: Parc des Princes; Attendance: 47,379; Referee: Frank Schneider

3 February 2018 24	Lille	0–3	Paris Saint-Germain	Villeneuve-d'Ascq
17:00 CET (UTC+1)	Alonso (yellow card) 73'	Report	Berchiche 45'; Verratti (yellow card) 55'; Neymar 76'; Lo Celso 86'	Stadium: Stade Pierre-Mauroy; Attendance: 49,082; Referee: Johan Hamel

10 February 2018 25	Toulouse	0–1	Paris Saint-Germain	Toulouse
17:00 CET (UTC+1)	Jean (yellow card) 40'; Gradel (yellow card) 41'; Sanogo (yellow card) 45'; Yago (yellow card) 59'	Report	Rabiot (yellow card) 20'; Diarra (yellow card) 55'; Diop 68' (o.g.)	Stadium: Stadium Municipal; Attendance: 31,909; Referee: Ruddy Buquet

17 February 2018 26	Paris Saint-Germain	5–2	Strasbourg	Paris
17:00 CET (UTC+1)	Draxler 9'; Neymar 20'; Di María 21'; Dani Alves (yellow card) 23'; Thiago Silva (yellow card) 67'; Cavani 72', 78'	Report	Aholou 5'; Costa (yellow card) 44'; Foulquier (yellow card) 56'; Bahoken 66'; Lala (yellow card) 73'	Stadium: Parc des Princes; Attendance: 47,059; Referee: Thomas Léonard

25 February 2018 27	Paris Saint-Germain	3–0	Marseille	Paris
21:00 CET (UTC+1)	Mbappé 9'; Rolando 26' (o.g.); Thiago Silva (yellow card) 32'; Cavani (yellow card) 45', (goal) 54'; Diarra (yellow card) 56'; Dani Alves (yellow card) 74'; Motta (yellow card) 81'; Di María (yellow card) 88'	Report	Ocampos (yellow card) 19'; Rolando (yellow card) 31'; Germain (yellow card) 48'; Amavi (yellow card) 59'; N'Jie (yellow card) 74'	Stadium: Parc des Princes; Attendance: 47,490; Referee: Benoît Bastien

3 March 2018 28	Troyes	0–2	Paris Saint-Germain	Troyes
17:00 CET (UTC+1)	Suk (yellow card) 36'; Azamoum (yellow card) 56'; Zelazny (yellow card) 78'	Report	Di María 47'; Diarra (yellow card) 67'; Nkunku 77'	Stadium: Stade de l'Aube; Attendance: 20,006; Referee: Karim Abed

10 March 2018 29	Paris Saint-Germain	5–0	Metz	Paris
17:00 CET (UTC+1)	Meunier 5'; Nkunku 20', 28'; Mbappé 45+1'; Thiago Silva 82'	Report	Diagne (yellow card) 40'	Stadium: Parc des Princes; Attendance: 47,227; Referee: Amaury Delerue

14 March 2018 30	Paris Saint-Germain	2–1	Angers	Paris
17:00 CET (UTC+1)	Mbappé 12', 25'; Motta (red card) 16'; Dani Alves (yellow card) 57'	Report	Bamba (yellow card) 33'; Toko Ekambi 75'; Thomas (yellow card) 80'	Stadium: Parc de Princes; Attendance: 46,757; Referee: Sébastien Desiage

18 March 2018 31	Nice	1–2	Paris Saint-Germain	Nice
13:00 CET (UTC+1)	Saint-Maximin 17'	Report	Di María 21'; Verratti (yellow card) 74'; Dani Alves 82'	Stadium: Allianz Riviera; Attendance: 33,478; Referee: François Letexier

6 April 2018 32	Saint-Étienne	1–1	Paris Saint-Germain	Saint-Étienne
20:45 CEST (UTC+2)	Cabella 17'; Selnæs (yellow card) 67'	Report	Kimpembe (yellow card) 29' (yellow-red card) 41'; Pastore (yellow card) 44'; Diarra (yellow card) 45+1'; Debuchy 90+2' (o.g.)	Stadium: Stade Geoffroy-Guichard; Attendance: 37,602; Referee: Nicolas Rainville

15 April 2018 33	Paris Saint-Germain	7–1	Monaco	Paris
21:00 CEST (UTC+2)	Lo Celso 15', 27'; Cavani 17'; Di María 19', 58'; Pastore (yellow card) 40'; Falcao 76' (o.g.); Draxler 86'	Report	Lopes 38'; Fabinho (yellow card) 61'; Raggi (yellow card) 61'; Moutinho (yellow card) 78'	Stadium: Parc de Princes; Attendance: 46,869; Referee: Ruddy Buquet

22 April 2018 34	Bordeaux	0–1	Paris Saint-Germain	Bordeaux
21:00 CEST (UTC+2)		Report	Lo Celso 77'; Kimpembe (yellow card) 89'	Stadium: Nouveau Stade de Bordeaux; Attendance: 41,290; Referee: Antony Gautier

29 April 2018 35	Paris Saint-Germain	2–2	Guingamp	Paris
21:00 CEST (UTC+2)	Thiago Silva (yellow card) 73'; Cavani 76' (pen.), 82'; Meunier (yellow card) 88'	Report	Blas 45'; Briand 68'	Stadium: Parc de Princes; Attendance: 47,759; Referee: Sébastien Moreira

4 May 2018 36	Amiens	2–2	Paris Saint-Germain	Amiens
20:45 CEST (UTC+2)	Konaté 47', 79'; Zungu (yellow card) 59'; Fofana (yellow card) 83'	Report	Cavani 26'; Nkunku 64'	Stadium: Stade de la Licorne; Attendance: 11,676; Referee: Hakim Ben El Hadj

12 May 2018 37	Paris Saint-Germain	0–2	Rennes	Paris
21:00 CEST (UTC+2)	Kimpembe (yellow card) 49'	Report	Bourigeaud 52' (pen.); Hunou 71'	Stadium: Parc de Princes; Attendance: 47,352; Referee: Jérôme Brisard

19 May 2018 38	Caen	0–0	Paris Saint-Germain	Caen
21:00 CEST (UTC+2)	Féret (yellow card) 34'; Guilbert (yellow card) 45'; Deminguet (yellow card) 90'	Report	Weah (yellow card) 9'	Stadium: Stade Michel d'Ornano; Attendance: 19,999; Referee: Antony Gautier

=== Coupe de France ===
7 January 2018 Round of 64	Rennes	1–6	Paris Saint-Germain	Rennes
21:00 CET (UTC+1)	Bourigeaud 66' (pen.)	Report	Mbappé 9', 74'; Neymar 17', 43'; Di María 24', 76'	Stadium: Roazhon Park; Attendance: 19,777; Referee: Amaury Delerue

24 January 2018 Round of 32	Paris Saint-Germain	4–2	Guingamp	Paris
18:30 CET (UTC+1)	Rabiot 21'; Deaux 25' (o.g.); Berchiche (yellow card) 36'; Lo Celso (yellow card) 41'; Pastore 64'; Marquinhos 89'	Report	Thuram 33' (pen.); Ngbakoto 75' (pen.)	Stadium: Parc des Princes; Attendance: 47,322; Referee: Antony Gautier

6 February 2018 Round of 16	Sochaux	1–4	Paris Saint-Germain	Montbéliard
21:05 CET (UTC+1)	Martin 13'	Report	Di María 1', 58', 62'; Cavani 27'; Verratti (yellow card) 35'; Trapp (red card) 90'	Stadium: Stade Auguste Bonal; Attendance: 20,000; Referee: Jérôme Brisard

28 February 2018 Quarter-final	Paris Saint-Germain	3–0	Marseille	Paris
21:05 CET (UTC+1)	Di María 45+1', 48'; Meunier (yellow card) 46'; Cavani 81'	Report	N'Jie (yellow card) 32'	Stadium: Parc des Princes; Attendance: 45,000; Referee: Clément Turpin

18 April 2018 Semi-final	Caen	1–3	Paris Saint-Germain	Caen
21:05 CEST (UTC+2)	Diomandé 43', (red card) 90'; Djiku (yellow card) 76'	Report	Berchiche (yellow card) 15'; Mbappé 25', 81'; Nkunku 90+5'	Stadium: Stade Michel d'Ornano; Attendance: 20,350; Referee: François Letexier

8 May 2018 Final	Les Herbiers VF	0–2	Paris Saint-Germain	Saint-Denis
21:05 CEST (UTC+2)	Pichot (yellow card) 73'	Report	Berchiche (yellow card) 15'; Lo Celso 26'; Cavani 74' (pen.)	Stadium: Stade de France; Attendance: 73,772; Referee: Mikael Lesage

=== Coupe de la Ligue ===
13 December 2017 Round of 16	Strasbourg	2–4	Paris Saint-Germain	Strasbourg
21:05 CET (UTC+1)	Grimm 36'; Gonçalves (yellow card) 49'; Blayac 88'	Report	Salmier 12' (o.g.); Di María 25'; Dani Alves 62'; Draxler 78'	Stadium: Stade de la Meinau; Attendance: 25,349; Referee: Mikael Lesage

10 January 2018 Quarter-final	Amiens	0–2	Paris Saint-Germain	Amiens
21:05 CET (UTC+1)	Gurtner (red card) 34'; Adénon (yellow card) 83'	Report	Draxler (yellow card) 47'; Neymar 53' (pen.); Rabiot 78'; Nkunku (yellow card) 81'	Stadium: Stade de la Licorne; Attendance: 9,222; Referee: Nicolas Rainville

30 January 2018 Semi-final	Rennes	2–3	Paris Saint-Germain	Rennes
21:05 CET (UTC+1)	Sarr (yellow card) 28'; Prcić (yellow card) 65', (goal) 90+2'; Traoré (yellow card) 69'; Khazri (yellow card) 69'; Sakho 85'; Lea Siliki (yellow card) 87'	Report	Meunier 24'; Marquinhos 53'; Lo Celso 58'; Mbappé (red card) 62'; Neymar (yellow card) 90+3'	Stadium: Roazhon Park; Attendance: 28,620; Referee: Mikael Lesage

31 March 2018 Final	Paris Saint-Germain	3–0	Monaco	Bordeaux
21:05 CEST (UTC+2)	Cavani 7' (pen.), 84'; Di María 20'	Report	Glik (yellow card) 30'; Falcao (yellow card) 64'; Raggi (yellow card) 74'	Stadium: Nouveau Stade de Bordeaux; Attendance: 41,248; Referee: Clément Turpin

=== UEFA Champions League ===
==== Group stage ====
Pos	Team	Pld	W	D	L	GF	GA	GD	Pts	Qualification	PAR	BAY	CEL	AND
1	(France) Paris Saint-Germain	6	5	0	1	25	4	+21	15 (Note: Head-to-head results: Paris Saint-Germain 3–0 Bayern Munich, Bayern Munich 3–1 Paris Saint-Germain.)	Advance to knockout phase	—	3–0	7–1	5–0
2	(Germany) Bayern Munich	6	5	0	1	13	6	+7	15	Advance to knockout phase	3–1	—	3–0	3–0
3	(Scotland) Celtic	6	1	0	5	5	18	−13	3 (Note: Head-to-head results: Anderlecht 0–3 Celtic, Celtic 0–1 Anderlecht.)	Transfer to Europa League	0–5	1–2	—	0–1
4	(Belgium) Anderlecht	6	1	0	5	2	17	−15	3		0–4	1–2	0–3	—

Source: UEFA
Rules for classification: Group stage tiebreakers
Notes:

12 September 2017 1	Celtic (Scotland)	0–5	(France) Paris Saint-Germain	Glasgow, Scotland
20:45 CEST (UTC+2)	Šimunović (yellow card) 39'; Ralston (yellow card) 53'	Report	Neymar 19', (yellow card) 76'; Mbappé 34'; Cavani 40' (pen.), 85'; Lustig 83' (o.g.)	Stadium: Celtic Park; Attendance: 57,562; Referee: Daniele Orsato (Italy)

27 September 2017 2	Paris Saint-Germain (France)	3–0	(Germany) Bayern Munich	Paris, France
20:45 CEST (UTC+2)	Dani Alves 2'; Cavani 31'; Neymar 63'; Verratti (yellow card) 73'	Report	Kimmich (yellow card) 23'; Vidal (yellow card) 45'; Thiago (yellow card) 60'; Rudy (yellow card) 78'	Stadium: Parc des Princes; Attendance: 46,252; Referee: Antonio Mateu Lahoz (Spain)

18 October 2017 3	Anderlecht (Belgium)	0–4	(France) Paris Saint-Germain	Anderlecht, Belgium
20:45 CEST (UTC+2)	Onyekuru (yellow card) 55'; Teodorczyk (yellow card) 71'	Report	Mbappé 3', (yellow card) 54'; Cavani 44'; Motta (yellow card) 51'; Neymar 66'; Di María 88'	Stadium: Constant Vanden Stock Stadium; Attendance: 19,108; Referee: Pavel Královec (Czech Republic)

31 October 2017 4	Paris Saint-Germain (France)	5–0	(Belgium) Anderlecht	Paris, France
20:45 CET (UTC+1)	Verratti 30'; Neymar 45+4'; Kurzawa 52', 72', 78'	Report		Stadium: Parc des Princes; Attendance: 46,403; Referee: David Fernández Borbalán (Spain)

22 November 2017 5	Paris Saint-Germain (France)	7–1	(Scotland) Celtic	Paris, France
20:45 CET (UTC+1)	Neymar 9', 22'; Cavani 28', 79'; Mbappé 35'; Verratti 75'; Dani Alves 80'	Report	Dembélé 1'; Šimunović (yellow card) 35'; Bitton (yellow card) 45+1'	Stadium: Parc des Princes; Attendance: 46,288; Referee: Anastasios Sidiropoulos (Greece)

5 December 2017 6	Bayern Munich (Germany)	3–1	(France) Paris Saint-Germain	Munich, Germany
20:45 CET (UTC+1)	Lewandowski 8'; Kimmich (yellow card) 23'; Rodríguez (yellow card) 23'; Tolisso 37', 69', (yellow card) 41'; Rudy (yellow card) 53'	Report	Marquinhos (yellow card) 41'; Mbappé 50'; Draxler (yellow card) 82'	Stadium: Allianz Arena; Attendance: 70,000; Referee: Cüneyt Çakır (Turkey)

==== Knockout phase ====
===== Round of 16 =====
14 February 2018 First leg	Real Madrid (Spain)	3–1	(France) Paris Saint-Germain	Madrid, Spain
20:45 CET (UTC+1)	Isco (yellow card) 33'; Ronaldo 45' (pen.), 83'; Nacho (yellow card) 78'; Marcelo 86'	Report	Neymar (yellow card) 15'; Lo Celso (yellow card) 25'; Rabiot 33', (yellow card) 64'; Meunier (yellow card) 90'	Stadium: Santiago Bernabéu; Attendance: 78,158; Referee: Gianluca Rocchi (Italy)

6 March 2018 Second leg	Paris Saint-Germain (France)	1–2 (2–5 agg.)	(Spain) Real Madrid	Paris, France
20:45 CET (UTC+1)	Verratti (yellow card) 20' (yellow-red card) 66'; Cavani 71', (yellow card) 84'	Report	Kovačić (yellow card) 32'; Ronaldo 51'; Ramos (yellow card) 78'; Casemiro 80'	Stadium: Parc des Princes; Attendance: 46,585; Referee: Felix Brych (Germany)

== Statistics ==
=== Appearances and goals ===
No.	Pos	Nat	Player	Total		Ligue 1		Coupe de France		Coupe de la Ligue		Trophée des Champions		Champions League	
No.	Pos	Nat	Player	Apps	Goals	Apps	Goals	Apps	Goals	Apps	Goals	Apps	Goals	Apps	Goals
Goalkeepers
1	GK	(Germany) GER	Kevin Trapp	14	0	4	0	6	0	4	0	0	0	0	0
16	GK	(France) FRA	Alphonse Areola	42	0	33	0	0	0	0	0	1	0	8	0
40	GK	(France) FRA	Sébastien Cibois	0	0	0	0	0	0	0	0	0	0	0	0
Defenders
2	DF	(Brazil) BRA	Thiago Silva	38	1	23+1	1	5	0	2	0	1	0	6	0
3	DF	(France) FRA	Presnel Kimpembe	37	0	26+1	0	4	0	3	0	0	0	2+1	0
5	DF	(Brazil) BRA	Marquinhos	41	2	25+1	0	3	1	3	1	1	0	8	0
12	DF	(Belgium) BEL	Thomas Meunier	33	5	16+7	4	4+1	0	3	1	1	0	0+1	0
17	DF	(Spain) ESP	Yuri Berchiche	32	2	19+3	2	5	0	3	0	0	0	2	0
20	DF	(France) FRA	Layvin Kurzawa	27	5	18+1	2	1	0	0	0	1	0	6	3
32	DF	(Brazil) BRA	Dani Alves	40	5	22+2	1	2+2	0	2+1	1	1	1	8	2
33	DF	(France) FRA	Kévin Rimane	1	0	0+1	0	0	0	0	0	0	0	0	0
38	DF	(France) FRA	Stanley N'Soki	1	0	0+1	0	0	0	0	0	0	0	0	0
Midfielders
6	MF	(Italy) ITA	Marco Verratti	38	2	20+2	0	3	0	4	0	1	0	8	2
8	MF	(Italy) ITA	Thiago Motta	27	1	13+5	1	2+2	0	0	0	1	0	4	0
11	MF	(Argentina) ARG	Ángel Di María	44	21	25+4	11	6	7	4	2	0	0	1+4	1
18	MF	(Argentina) ARG	Giovani Lo Celso	47	6	17+15	4	4	1	1+3	1	0	0	1+6	0
19	MF	(France) FRA	Lassana Diarra	15	0	8+2	0	1+1	0	0+2	0	0	0	0+1	0
21	MF	(France) FRA	Hatem Ben Arfa	0	0	0	0	0	0	0	0	0	0	0	0
23	MF	(Germany) GER	Julian Draxler	45	5	18+10	4	4+2	0	3	1	0	0	3+5	0
24	MF	(France) FRA	Christopher Nkunku	25	5	6+12	4	0+3	1	0+3	0	0+1	0	0	0
25	MF	(France) FRA	Adrien Rabiot	50	5	27+6	1	4+1	1	3	1	1	1	8	1
27	MF	(Argentina) ARG	Javier Pastore	36	5	14+10	4	1+4	1	2+1	0	1	0	0+3	0
38	MF	(France) FRA	Yacine Adli	1	0	0+1	0	0	0	0	0	0	0	0	0
Forwards
9	FW	(Uruguay) URU	Edinson Cavani	48	38	30+2	26	5	3	2	2	1	0	8	7
10	FW	(Brazil) BRA	Neymar	30	28	20	19	1	2	2	1	0	0	7	6
29	FW	(France) FRA	Kylian Mbappé	43	21	23+3	13	5	4	3+1	0	0	0	8	4
37	FW	(United States) USA	Timothy Weah	3	0	1+2	0	0	0	0	0	0	0	0	0
Players transferred out during the season
7	FW	(Brazil) BRA	Lucas Moura	6	1	0+5	1	0	0	0+1	0	0	0	0	0
14	MF	(France) FRA	Blaise Matuidi	3	0	0+2	0	0	0	0	0	0+1	0	0	0
15	FW	(Portugal) POR	Gonçalo Guedes	2	0	0+1	0	0	0	0	0	0+1	0	0	0
31	DF	(France) FRA	Alec Georgen	0	0	0	0	0	0	0	0	0	0	0	0
40	GK	(France) FRA	Rémy Descamps	0	0	0	0	0	0	0	0	0	0	0	0

Last updated: 19 May 2018
Source: Competitions
