= 2018–19 Paris Saint-Germain FC season =

49th season in existence of Paris Saint-Germain

Paris Saint-Germain
2018–19 season
- President: Nasser Al-Khelaifi
- Head coach: Thomas Tuchel
- Stadium: Parc des Princes
- Ligue 1: 1st
- Coupe de France: Runners-up
- Coupe de la Ligue: Quarter-finals
- Trophée des Champions: Winners
- UEFA Champions League: Round of 16
- Top goalscorer: League: Kylian Mbappé (33); All: Kylian Mbappé (39)
- Highest home attendance: 47,647 (vs. Marseille – 17 March 2019)
- Lowest home attendance: 38,403 (vs. Strasbourg – 23 January 2019)
- Average home league attendance: 46,939
- Biggest win: 9–0 (vs. Guingamp – 19 January 2019)
- Biggest defeat: 1–5 (vs. Lille – 14 March 2019)
Home colours	Away colours	Third colours

The 2018–19 season was Paris Saint-Germain Football Club's 46th professional season since its creation in 1970, and its 45th consecutive season in the top-flight of French football.

The season was the first since 2010–11 without Thiago Motta, who retired after the 2017–18 season.

== Players ==
French teams are limited to four players without EU citizenship. Hence, the squad list includes only the principal nationality of each player; several non-European players on the squad have dual citizenship with an EU country. Also, players from the ACP countries—countries in Africa, the Caribbean, and the Pacific that are signatories to the Cotonou Agreement—are not counted against non-EU quotas due to the Kolpak ruling.

=== Squad information ===
As of 29 January 2019

Note: Flags indicate national team as defined under FIFA eligibility rules; some limited exceptions apply. Players may hold more than one non-FIFA nationality.

No.	Pos.	Nation	Player
1	GK	ITA	Gianluigi Buffon
2	DF	BRA	Thiago Silva (captain)
3	DF	FRA	Presnel Kimpembe
4	DF	GER	Thilo Kehrer
5	DF	BRA	Marquinhos (vice-captain)
6	MF	ITA	Marco Verratti
7	FW	FRA	Kylian Mbappé
8	MF	ARG	Leandro Paredes
9	FW	URU	Edinson Cavani
10	FW	BRA	Neymar
11	MF	ARG	Ángel Di María
12	DF	BEL	Thomas Meunier

No.	Pos.	Nation	Player
13	DF	BRA	Dani Alves
14	DF	ESP	Juan Bernat
16	GK	FRA	Alphonse Areola
17	FW	CMR	Eric Maxim Choupo-Moting
20	DF	FRA	Layvin Kurzawa
23	MF	GER	Julian Draxler
24	MF	FRA	Christopher Nkunku
25	MF	FRA	Adrien Rabiot
27	FW	FRA	Moussa Diaby
31	DF	FRA	Colin Dagba
34	DF	FRA	Stanley N'Soki
50	GK	FRA	Sébastien Cibois

== Transfers ==
=== In ===
For recent transfers see List of French football transfers summer 2018

No.	Pos	Player	Transferred from	Fee	Date	Source
7	FW	(France) Kylian Mbappé	(France) Monaco	€180,000,000	1 July 2018	
1	GK	(Italy) Gianluigi Buffon	(Italy) Juventus	Free transfer	6 July 2018	
4	DF	(Germany) Thilo Kehrer	(Germany) Schalke 04	€37,000,000	12 August 2018	
14	DF	(Spain) Juan Bernat	(Germany) Bayern Munich	€5,000,000	31 August 2018	
17	FW	(Cameroon) Eric Maxim Choupo-Moting	(England) Stoke City	Free transfer	31 August 2018	
8	MF	(Argentina) Leandro Paredes	(Russia) Zenit Saint Petersburg	€40,000,000	29 January 2019	

=== Out ===
No.	Pos	Player	Transferred To	Fee	Date	Source
8	MF	(Italy) Thiago Motta	Retired	N/A	1 July 2018	
21	MF	(France) Hatem Ben Arfa	End of contract	N/A	1 July 2018	
27	MF	(Argentina) Javier Pastore	(Italy) Roma	€24,700,000	1 July 2018	
—	FW	(France) Odsonne Edouard	(Scotland) Celtic	€10,300,000	1 July 2018	
17	DF	(Spain) Yuri Berchiche	(Spain) Athletic Bilbao	€24,000,000	2 July 2018	
—	FW	(France) Jonathan Ikoné	(France) Lille	€5,000,000	2 July 2018	
4	MF	(Poland) Grzegorz Krychowiak	(Russia) Lokomotiv Moscow	Loan	24 July 2018	
—	GK	(France) Rémy Descamps	(France) Clermont	Loan	21 August 2018	
15	FW	(Portugal) Gonçalo Guedes	(Spain) Valencia	€40,000,000	27 August 2018	
30	GK	(Germany) Kevin Trapp	(Germany) Eintracht Frankfurt	Loan	31 August 2018	
18	MF	(Argentina) Giovani Lo Celso	(Spain) Real Betis	Loan	31 August 2018	
38	FW	(France) Jean-Christophe Bahebeck	(Netherlands) Utrecht	N/A	31 August 2018	
21	FW	(United States) Timothy Weah	(Scotland) Celtic	Loan	7 January 2019	
22	FW	(Spain) Jesé	(Spain) Real Betis	Loan	29 January 2019	
29	MF	(France) Yacine Adli	(France) Bordeaux	€5,500,000	1 February 2019	
33	MF	(France) Antoine Bernède	(Austria) Red Bull Salzburg	Undisclosed	6 February 2019	
37	DF	(French Guiana) Kévin Rimane	(Croatia) NK Istra 1961	Loan	8 February 2019	
19	MF	(France) Lassana Diarra	Retired	N/A	21 February 2019	

== Kits ==
Home (Domestic)	Home alt. (Domestic)	Away (Domestic)	Away alt. (Domestic)	Third and Home (Europe)	Away (Europe)
Goalkeeper 1	Goalkeeper 2

== Pre-season and friendlies ==
11 July 2018 Friendly	Paris Saint-Germain	1–0	Sainte-Geneviève Sports	Saint-Germain-en-Laye, France
17:30 CEST (UTC+2)	Nkunku 80'			Stadium: Camp des Loges
Note: Forty minute halves.

15 July 2018 Friendly	Paris Saint-Germain	2–4	Chambly	Saint-Germain-en-Laye, France
11:00 CEST (UTC+2)	Dagba 64'; Postolachi 68'		Soubervie 5' (pen.); Doucouré 44'; Etshimi 46'; Dadoune 77'	Stadium: Camp des Loges

=== International Champions Cup ===
21 July 2018 Match 1	Bayern Munich	3–1	Paris Saint-Germain	Klagenfurt, Austria
15:30 CEST (UTC+2)	Martínez 60'; Sanches 68'; Zirkzee 78'	Report	Weah 31'	Stadium: Wörthersee Stadion; Attendance: 22,300; Referee: Alexander Harkam (Austria)

28 July 2018 Match 2	Arsenal	5–1	Paris Saint-Germain	Kallang, Singapore
19:30 SGT (UTC+8)	Özil 13'; Lacazette 67', 71'; Holding 87'; Nketiah 90+4'	Report	Diarra (yellow card) 51'; Nkunku 60' (pen.)	Stadium: National Stadium; Attendance: 50,308; Referee: Nathan Rong De Chan (Singapore)

30 July 2018 Match 3	Paris Saint-Germain	3–2	Atlético Madrid	Kallang, Singapore
19:30 SGT (UTC+8)	Nkunku 32'; Diaby 71'; Sissako (yellow card) 74'; Postolachi 90+2'	Report	Mollejo 75'; Bernede 86' (o.g.)	Stadium: National Stadium; Attendance: 50,038; Referee: Muhammad Taqi Aljaafari Bin Jahari (Singapore)

== Competitions ==
=== Overview ===
Competition	First match	Last match	Starting round	Final position	Record							
Competition	First match	Last match	Starting round	Final position	Pld	W	D	L	GF	GA	GD	Win %
Ligue 1	12 August 2018	24 May 2019	Matchday 1	Winners	38	29	4	5	105	35	+70	76.32
Coupe de France	6 January 2019	27 April 2019	Round of 64	Runners-up	6	5	1	0	17	2	+15	83.33
Coupe de la Ligue	18 December 2018	9 January 2019	Round of 16	Quarter-finals	2	1	0	1	3	3	+0	50.00
Trophée des Champions	4 August 2018		Final	Winners	1	1	0	0	4	0	+4	100.00
Champions League	18 September 2018	6 March 2019	Group stage	Round of 16	8	4	2	2	20	12	+8	50.00
Total					55	40	7	8	149	52	+97	72.73

Source: Competitions

=== Trophée des Champions ===
4 August 2018	Paris Saint-Germain	4–0	Monaco	Shenzhen, China
14:00 CEST (UTC+02:00)	Di María 33', 90+2'; Nkunku 40'; Weah 68'	Report	Jemerson (yellow card) 5'; Raggi (yellow card) 90+2'	Stadium: Shenzhen Universiade Sports Centre; Attendance: 41,237; Referee: Ruddy Buquet

=== Ligue 1 ===
==== League table ====
Pos	Team	Pld	W	D	L	GF	GA	GD	Pts	Qualification or relegation
1	Paris Saint-Germain (C)	38	29	4	5	105	35	+70	91	Qualification to Champions League group stage
2	Lille	38	22	9	7	68	33	+35	75	Qualification to Champions League group stage
3	Lyon	38	21	9	8	70	47	+23	72	Qualification to Champions League group stage
4	Saint-Étienne	38	19	9	10	59	41	+18	66	Qualification to Europa League group stage
5	Marseille	38	18	7	13	60	52	+8	61	

Source: Ligue 1 and Soccerway
Rules for classification: 1) Points; 2) Goal difference; 3) Head-to-head points; 4) Head-to-head goal difference; 5) Head-to-head goals scored; 6) Head-to-head away goals scored; 7) Goals scored; 8) Away goals scored; 9) Most goals scored in single league match; 10) Fairplay ranking.
(C) Champions

==== Results summary ====
Overall								Home						Away					
Pld	W	D	L	GF	GA	GD	Pts	W	D	L	GF	GA	GD	W	D	L	GF	GA	GD
38	29	4	5	105	35	+70	91	17	2	0	63	10	+53	12	2	5	42	25	+17

Source: Ligue 1

==== Results by round ====
Round	1	2	3	4	5	6	7	8	9	10	11	12	13	14	15	16	17	18	19	20	21	22	23	24	25	26	27	28	29	30	31	32	33	34	35	36	37	38
Ground	H	A	H	A	H	A	H	A	H	H	A	H	A	H	A	A	H	A	H	A	H	H	A	H	A	H	A	A	H	A	H	A	H	A	H	A	H	A
Result	W	W	W	W	W	W	W	W	W	W	W	W	W	W	D	D	W	W	W	W	W	W	L	W	W	W	W	L	W	W	D	L	W	L	D	W	W	L
Position	2	1	1	1	1	1	1	1	1	1	1	1	1	1	1	1	1	1	1	1	1	1	1	1	1	1	1	1	1	1	1	1	1	1	1	1	1	1

Source: Matches
A = Away; H = Home; W = Win; D = Draw; L = Loss; P = Postponed

==== Matches ====
12 August 2018 1	Paris Saint-Germain	3–0	Caen	Paris
21:00 CEST (UTC+2)	Neymar 10'; Rabiot 35'; Weah 89', (yellow card) 89'	Report		Stadium: Parc des Princes; Attendance: 47,289; Referee: Benoît Bastien

18 August 2018 2	Guingamp	1–3	Paris Saint-Germain	Guingamp
17:00 CEST (UTC+2)	Roux 20'	Report	Rabiot (yellow card) 19'; Neymar 53' (pen.); Mbappé 82', 90'	Stadium: Stade de Roudourou; Attendance: 19,003; Referee: Clément Turpin

25 August 2018 3	Paris Saint-Germain	3–1	Angers	Paris
17:00 CEST (UTC+2)	Cavani 12'; Kehrer (yellow card) 21'; Mbappé 52'; N'Soki (yellow card) 63'; Neymar 66'	Report	Mangani 21' (pen.)	Stadium: Parc des Princes; Attendance: 47,105; Referee: Jérôme Miguelgorry

1 September 2018 4	Nîmes	2–4	Paris Saint-Germain	Nîmes
17:00 CEST (UTC+2)	Diallo (yellow card) 3'; Bobichon 63'; Savanier 71' (pen.), (red card) 90+3'	Report	Neymar 36', (yellow card) 51'; Di María 40'; Mbappé (yellow card) 18' (red card) 90+3', (goal) 77'; Meunier (yellow card) 58'; Cavani 90+2'	Stadium: Stade des Costières; Attendance: 15,311; Referee: Jérôme Brisard

14 September 2018 5	Paris Saint-Germain	4–0	Saint-Étienne	Paris
20:45 CEST (UTC+2)	Draxler 23'; Rabiot (yellow card) 38'; Cavani 51' (pen.); Di María 76'; Diaby 84'	Report	Khazri (yellow card) 63'	Stadium: Parc des Princes; Attendance: 46,549; Referee: Frank Schneider

23 September 2018 6	Rennes	1–3	Paris Saint-Germain	Rennes
15:00 CEST (UTC+2)	Rabiot 11' (o.g.); Bensebaini (yellow card) 19'; Traoré (yellow card) 90+1'	Report	Draxler (yellow card) 19'; Di María 45'; Meunier 61'; Bernat (yellow card) 63'; Rabiot (yellow card) 76'; Choupo-Moting 83'	Stadium: Roazhon Park; Attendance: 29,205; Referee: Hakim Ben El Hadj

26 September 2018 7	Paris Saint-Germain	4–1	Reims	Paris
21:00 CEST (UTC+2)	Cavani 5', 44'; Neymar 24' (pen.); Meunier 55'	Report	Chavalerin 2'; Romao (yellow card) 40'	Stadium: Parc des Princes; Attendance: 47,237; Referee: Olivier Thual

29 September 2018 8	Nice	0–3	Paris Saint-Germain	Nice
17:15 CEST (UTC+2)	Cyprien (yellow card) 45+1' (yellow-red card) 59'; Dante (yellow card) 55'	Report	Neymar 22', 90+2'; Nkunku 46'; Mbappé (yellow card) 67'; Bernat (yellow card) 87'	Stadium: Allianz Riviera; Attendance: 33,138; Referee: Clément Turpin

7 October 2018 9	Paris Saint-Germain	5–0	Lyon	Paris
21:00 CEST (UTC+2)	Neymar 9' (pen.), (yellow card) 38'; Kimpembe (red card) 32'; Verratti (yellow card) 44'; Mbappé 61', 66', 69', 74'	Report	Tousart (yellow card) 26' (yellow-red card) 45'; Aouar (yellow card) 59'; Morel (yellow card) 64'	Stadium: Parc des Princes; Attendance: 47,443; Referee: Antony Gautier

20 October 2018 10	Paris Saint-Germain	5–0	Amiens	Paris
17:00 CEST (UTC+2)	Marquinhos 12'; Rabiot 42'; Draxler 80'; Mbappé 82'; Diaby 87'	Report		Stadium: Parc des Princes; Attendance: 47,497; Referee: Mikael Lesage

28 October 2018 11	Marseille	0–2	Paris Saint-Germain	Marseille
21:00 CET (UTC+1)	Ocampos (yellow card) 81'; Strootman (yellow card) 86'; Amavi (yellow card) 90+1'; Luiz Gustavo (yellow card) 90+2'	Report	Kehrer (yellow card) 43'; Di María (yellow card) 52'; Mbappé 65'; Draxler 90+5'	Stadium: Stade Vélodrome; Attendance: 64,696; Referee: Benoît Bastien

2 November 2018 12	Paris Saint-Germain	2–1	Lille	Paris
20:45 CET (UTC+1)	Bernat (yellow card) 19'; Verratti (yellow card) 54'; Mbappé 70'; Neymar 84'	Report	Ballo-Touré (yellow card) 1'; Mendes (yellow card) 46'; Çelik (yellow card) 56'; Pépé 90+3' (pen.)	Stadium: Parc des Princes; Attendance: 47,549; Referee: François Letexier

11 November 2018 13	Monaco	0–4	Paris Saint-Germain	Fontvieille
21:00 CET (UTC+1)		Report	Cavani 5', 12', 53'; Neymar 64' (pen.)	Stadium: Stade Louis II; Attendance: 12,533; Referee: Ruddy Buquet

24 November 2018 14	Paris Saint-Germain	1–0	Toulouse	Paris
17:00 CET (UTC+1)	Cavani 9'	Report		Stadium: Parc des Princes; Attendance: 47,244; Referee: Hakim Ben El Hadj

2 December 2018 15	Bordeaux	2–2	Paris Saint-Germain	Bordeaux
21:00 CET (UTC+1)	Briand 53'; Palencia (yellow card) 63'; Cornelius 84'	Report	Kehrer (yellow card) 32'; Neymar 34'; Mbappé 66'; Verratti (yellow card) 77'	Stadium: Matmut Atlantique; Attendance: 40,841; Referee: Frank Schneider

5 December 2018 16	Strasbourg	1–1	Paris Saint-Germain	Strasbourg
21:00 CET (UTC+1)	Lala 40' (pen.); Martinez (yellow card) 61'; Thomasson (yellow card) 75'	Report	Draxler (yellow card) 30'; Cavani 71' (pen.); Dani Alves (yellow card) 75'; Verratti (yellow card) 88'	Stadium: Stade de la Meinau; Attendance: 25,702; Referee: Antony Gautier

22 December 2018 19	Paris Saint-Germain	1–0	Nantes	Paris
21:00 CET (UTC+1)	Mbappé 68'; Thiago Silva (yellow card) 88'; Marquinhos (yellow card) 90+4'	Report		Stadium: Parc des Princes; Attendance: 47,511; Referee: Karim Abed

12 January 2019 20	Amiens	0–3	Paris Saint-Germain	Amiens
17:00 CET (UTC+1)	Adénon (yellow card) 39' (yellow-red card) 66'; Blin (yellow card) 56'	Report	Cavani 57' (pen.); Mbappé 70'; Marquinhos 79'	Stadium: Stade de la Licorne; Attendance: 11,932; Referee: Florent Batta

19 January 2019 21	Paris Saint-Germain	9–0	Guingamp	Paris
17:00 CET (UTC+1)	Neymar 12', 68'; Mbappé 38', 45', 80'; Cavani 60', 66', 75'; Meunier 83'; Kurzawa (yellow card) 89'	Report		Stadium: Parc des Princes; Attendance: 47,268; Referee: Amaury Delerue

27 January 2019 22	Paris Saint-Germain	4–1	Rennes	Paris
21:00 CET (UTC+1)	Cavani 7', 71'; Di María 60'; Mbappé 66'; Thiago Silva (yellow card) 80'	Report	Niang 28', (yellow card) 35'; Traoré (yellow card) 62'	Stadium: Parc des Princes; Attendance: 43,307; Referee: Karim Abed

3 February 2019 23	Lyon	2–1	Paris Saint-Germain	Décines-Charpieu
21:00 CET (UTC+1)	Dembélé 33'; Fekir 49' (pen.), (yellow card) 90+1'	Report	Di María 7'; Kimpembe (yellow card) 27'; Draxler (yellow card) 89'	Stadium: Parc Olympique Lyonnais; Attendance: 57,624; Referee: Clément Turpin

9 February 2019 24	Paris Saint-Germain	1–0	Bordeaux	Paris
17:00 CET (UTC+1)	Nsoki (yellow card) 10'; Thiago Silva (yellow card) 32'; Cavani 42' (pen.); Diaby (yellow card) 62'	Report	Sankharé (yellow card) 2'; Kamano (yellow card) 18'; De Préville (yellow card) 52'	Stadium: Parc des Princes; Attendance: 47,274; Referee: Ruddy Buquet

17 February 2019 25	Saint-Étienne	0–1	Paris Saint-Germain	Saint-Étienne
21:00 CET (UTC+1)	Khazri (yellow card) 41'	Report	Bernat (yellow card) 50'; Dani Alves (yellow card) 59'; Mbappé 73', (yellow card) 90+5'; Areola (yellow card) 90'; Kurzawa (yellow card) 90+4'	Stadium: Stade Geoffroy-Guichard; Attendance: 39,652; Referee: Benoît Bastien

20 February 2019 17	Paris Saint-Germain	5–1	Montpellier	Paris
21:00 CET (UTC+1)	Kurzawa 13'; Di María 45+1'; Dani Alves (yellow card) 64'; Verratti (yellow card) 67'; Nkunku 73'; Hilton 78' (o.g.); Mbappé 79'	Report	Mollet 31'; Oyongo (yellow card) 59'	Stadium: Parc des Princes; Attendance: 47,198; Referee: François Letexier
Note: The match, originally scheduled for 8 December 2018, was postponed due to security concerns as a result of the yellow vests movement.

23 February 2019 26	Paris Saint-Germain	3–0	Nîmes	Paris
17:00 CET (UTC+1)	Paredes (yellow card) 16'; Nkunku 40'; Mbappé (yellow card) 45+1', (goal) 69', 90'; Bernat (yellow card) 72'	Report		Stadium: Parc des Princes; Attendance: 47,377; Referee: Amaury Delerue

2 March 2019 27	Caen	1–2	Paris Saint-Germain	Caen
17:00 CET (UTC+1)	Crivelli (yellow card) 1'; Ninga 56', (yellow card) 56'	Report	Mbappé 59' (pen.), 87'; Dani Alves (yellow card) 67'	Stadium: Stade Michel d'Ornano; Attendance: 20,076; Referee: Hakim Ben El Hadj

12 March 2019 18	Dijon	0–4	Paris Saint-Germain	Dijon
19:00 CET (UTC+1)	Lautoa (yellow card) 49'; Keita (yellow card) 69'	Report	Marquinhos 7', (yellow card) 37'; Mbappé 40'; Di María 50'; Choupo-Moting 90+2'	Stadium: Stade Gaston Gérard; Attendance: 15,117; Referee: Jérôme Miguelgorry
Note: The match, originally scheduled for 15 December 2018, was postponed due to security concerns as a result of the yellow vests movement.

17 March 2019 29	Paris Saint-Germain	3–1	Marseille	Paris
21:00 CET (UTC+1)	Thiago Silva (yellow card) 17'; Kurzawa (yellow card) 26'; Mbappé 45+2'; Di María 55', 66', (yellow card) 39'; Kimpembe (yellow card) 58'	Report	Kamara (yellow card) 29'; Germain 46'; Ocampos (yellow card) 58'; Mandanda (red card) 62'; Sakai (yellow card) 89'	Stadium: Parc des Princes; Attendance: 47,647; Referee: Antony Gautier

31 March 2019 30	Toulouse	0–1	Paris Saint-Germain	Toulouse
21:00 CEST (UTC+2)	Sangaré (yellow card) 8'; Sidibé (yellow card) 25'	Report	Kehrer (yellow card) 36'; Mbappé 74'	Stadium: Stadium Municipal; Attendance: 27,147; Referee: Amaury Delerue

7 April 2019 31	Paris Saint-Germain	2–2	Strasbourg	Paris
21:00 CEST (UTC+2)	Choupo-Moting 13'; Kehrer 82'	Report	Costa 26'; Gonçalves 38'; Lala (yellow card) 57'; Sels (yellow card) 88'	Stadium: Parc des Princes; Attendance: 47,419; Referee: Thomas Leonard

14 April 2019 32	Lille	5–1	Paris Saint-Germain	Lille
21:00 CEST (UTC+2)	Meunier 7' (o.g.); Mendes (yellow card) 45+2'; Pépé 51'; Bamba 65'; Gabriel 71'; J. Fonte 84'	Report	Bernat 11', (red card) 36'; Mbappé (yellow card) 45+5'; Draxler (yellow card) 77'; Verratti (yellow card) 81'	Stadium: Stade Pierre-Mauroy; Attendance: 49,712; Referee: Benoît Bastien

17 April 2019 28	Nantes	3–2	Paris Saint-Germain	Nantes
19:00 CEST (UTC+2)	Diego 22'; Waris 44'; Dani Alves 52' (o.g.); Dupé (yellow card) 90+3'	Report	Dani Alves 19'; Kimpembe (yellow card) 55'; Draxler (yellow card) 73'; Dagba (yellow card) 79'; Güçlü 89'	Stadium: Stade de la Beaujoire; Attendance: 34,471; Referee: Antony Gautier

21 April 2019 33	Paris Saint-Germain	3–1	Monaco	Paris
21:00 CEST (UTC+2)	Mbappé 15', 38', 56'	Report	Glik (yellow card) 30'; Golovin 80'	Stadium: Parc des Princes; Attendance: 43,581; Referee: Clément Turpin

30 April 2019 34	Montpellier	3–2	Paris Saint-Germain	Montpellier
19:00 CEST (UTC+2)	Kimpembe 22' (o.g.); Suárez (yellow card) 45+1'; Skhiri (yellow card) 56'; Le Tallec (yellow card) 72'; Delort 80'; Camara 85'	Report	Oyongo 12' (o.g.); Kimpembe (yellow card) 29'; Bernat (yellow card) 40'; Di María 62'; Dagba (yellow card) 76'; Kurzawa (yellow card) 90'	Stadium: Stade de la Mosson; Attendance: 20,477; Referee: Mikael Lesage

4 May 2019 35	Paris Saint-Germain	1–1	Nice	Paris
17:00 CEST (UTC+2)	Verratti (yellow card) 54'; Neymar 60' (pen.); Cavani (penalty missed) 90+3’, (yellow card) 90+7'	Report	Ganago 46'; Atal (yellow card) 69'; Dante (yellow card) 90'; Hérelle (yellow card) 90+7'	Stadium: Parc des Princes; Attendance: 47,283; Referee: Frank Schneider

11 May 2019 36	Angers	1–2	Paris Saint-Germain	Angers
17:00 CEST (UTC+2)	Tait 87'	Report	Neymar 20'; Di María 58'; Marquinhos (red card) 85'	Stadium: Stade Raymond Kopa; Attendance: 14,728; Referee: Florent Batta

18 May 2019 37	Paris Saint-Germain	4–0	Dijon	Paris
21:00 CEST (UTC+2)	Di María 3'; Cavani 4'; Meunier (yellow card) 31'; Mbappé 36', 56'	Report	Amalfitano (yellow card) 71'	Stadium: Parc des Princes; Attendance: 47,532; Referee: Jérôme Brisard

24 May 2019 38	Reims	3–1	Paris Saint-Germain	Reims
21:05 CEST (UTC+2)	Dingomé (yellow card) 15'; Rahman 36'; Cafaro 56'; Mendy (yellow card) 80'; Chavarría 90+5'	Report	Draxler (yellow card) 44'; Mbappé 59'	Stadium: Stade Auguste-Delaune; Attendance: 20,299; Referee: Nicolas Rainville

=== Coupe de France ===
6 January 2019 Round of 64	GSI Pontivy	0–4	Paris Saint-Germain	Lorient
20:45 CET (UTC+1)	Péru (yellow card) 31'	Report	Jule 24' (o.g.); Kurzawa (yellow card) 32'; Neymar (yellow card) 52', (goal) 70'; Nsoki (yellow card) 75'; Mbappé 77' (pen.); Bernat (yellow card) 83'; Draxler 87'	Stadium: Stade du Moustoir; Attendance: 14,201; Referee: William Lavis

23 January 2019 Round of 32	Paris Saint-Germain	2–0	Strasbourg	Paris
21:05 CET (UTC+1)	Cavani 4', (yellow card) 49'; Di María 80'; Kehrer (yellow card) 86'	Report	Aaneba (yellow card) 28'	Stadium: Parc des Princes; Attendance: 38,403; Referee: Johan Hamel

6 February 2019 Round of 16	FC Villefranche	0–3 (a.e.t.)	Paris Saint-Germain	Décines-Charpieu
18:30 CET (UTC+1)	Benedick (yellow card) 27'; N'Diaye (yellow card) 72'	Report	Draxler (yellow card) 76', (goal) 102'; Diaby 113'; Cavani 119'	Stadium: Parc Olympique Lyonnais; Attendance: 22,858; Referee: Antony Gautier

26 February 2019 Quarter-finals	Paris Saint-Germain	3–0	Dijon	Paris
21:00 CET (UTC+1)	Di María 8', 28'; Verratti (yellow card) 43'; Meunier 76'	Report	Coulibaly (yellow card) 74'	Stadium: Parc des Princes; Attendance: 43,000; Referee: Frank Schneider

3 April 2019 Semi-finals	Paris Saint-Germain	3–0	Nantes	Paris
21:00 CEST (UTC+2)	Verratti 29', (yellow card) 69'; Mbappé 85' (pen.); Bernat (yellow card) 87'; Dani Alves 90+2'	Report	Coulibaly (yellow card) 54' (yellow-red card) 72'; Waris (yellow card) 64'; Fábio (yellow card) 65'; Diego Carlos (yellow card) 84'	Stadium: Parc des Princes; Attendance: 45,000; Referee: François Letexier

27 April 2019 Final	Rennes	2–2 (a.e.t.) (6–5 p)	Paris Saint-Germain	Saint-Denis
21:00 CEST (UTC+2)	Grenier (yellow card) 24'; Kimpembe 40' (o.g.); Mexer 66', (yellow card) 68'; Bourigeaud (yellow card) 71'; André (yellow card) 97'; Niang (yellow card) 107'; Bensebaini (yellow card) 112'; Léa Siliki (yellow card) 118'	Report	Dani Alves 13'; Neymar 21', (yellow card) 44'; Verratti (yellow card) 29'; Di María (yellow card) 55'; Paredes (yellow card) 95'; Mbappé (red card) 118'	Stadium: Stade de France; Attendance: 75,000; Referee: Ruddy Buquet
	Penalties
	Niang (penalty scored); Ben Arfa (penalty scored); Grenier (penalty scored); Léa Siliki (penalty scored); Bensebaini (penalty scored); Sarr (penalty scored)		(penalty scored) Cavani; (penalty scored) Dani Alves; (penalty scored) Paredes; (penalty scored) Bernat; (penalty scored) Neymar; (penalty missed) Nkunku

=== Coupe de la Ligue ===
18 December 2018 Round of 16	Orléans	1–2	Paris Saint-Germain	Orléans
21:00 CET (UTC+1)	Le Tallec (yellow card) 30'; Lopy 69'	Report	Cavani 41'; Diaby 81'; Bernat (yellow card) 82'	Stadium: Stade de la Source; Attendance: 7,812; Referee: Jérôme Miguelgorry

9 January 2019 Quarter-finals	Paris Saint-Germain	1–2	Guingamp	Paris
21:05 CET (UTC+1)	Neymar 63', (yellow card) 90+5'; Verratti (yellow card) 90+5'; Cavani (yellow card) 90+5'	Report	Ngbakoto 83' (pen.); Thuram 90+2' (pen.)	Stadium: Parc des Princes; Attendance: 47,576; Referee: Benoît Bastien

=== UEFA Champions League ===
==== Group stage ====
Pos	Team	Pld	W	D	L	GF	GA	GD	Pts	Qualification	PAR	LIV	NAP	RSB
1	(France) Paris Saint-Germain	6	3	2	1	17	9	+8	11	Advance to knockout phase	—	2–1	2–2	6–1
2	(England) Liverpool	6	3	0	3	9	7	+2	9 (Note: Goals in all group matches: Liverpool 9, Napoli 7.)	Advance to knockout phase	3–2	—	1–0	4–0
3	(Italy) Napoli	6	2	3	1	7	5	+2	9	Transfer to Europa League	1–1	1–0	—	3–1
4	(Serbia) Red Star Belgrade	6	1	1	4	5	17	−12	4		1–4	2–0	0–0	—

Source: UEFA
Notes:

18 September 2018 1	Liverpool (England)	3–2	(France) Paris Saint-Germain	Liverpool, England
21:00 CEST (UTC+02:00)	Van Dijk (yellow card) 27'; Sturridge 30'; Milner 36' (pen.); Firmino 90+2'	Report	Meunier 40', (yellow card) 45+1'; Mbappé 83'	Stadium: Anfield; Attendance: 52,478; Referee: Cüneyt Çakır (Turkey)

3 October 2018 2	Paris Saint-Germain (France)	6–1	(Serbia) Red Star Belgrade	Paris, France
18:55 CEST (UTC+02:00)	Neymar 20', 22', 81'; Cavani 37'; Di María 42'; Mbappé 70'	Report	Stojković (yellow card) 68'; Marin 74'; Pavkov (yellow card) 75'	Stadium: Parc des Princes; Attendance: 39,979; Referee: Artur Soares Dias (Portugal)

24 October 2018 3	Paris Saint-Germain (France)	2–2	(Italy) Napoli	Paris, France
21:00 CEST (UTC+02:00)	Marquinhos (yellow card) 5'; Mário Rui 61' (o.g.); Di María 90+3'; Draxler (yellow card) 90+5'	Report	Insigne 29'; Mertens (yellow card) 9', (goal) 77'; Mário Rui (yellow card) 33'; Callejón (yellow card) 81'; Maksimović (yellow card) 86'; Ospina (yellow card) 90+2'	Stadium: Parc des Princes; Attendance: 46,274; Referee: Felix Zwayer (Germany)

6 November 2018 4	Napoli (Italy)	1–1	(France) Paris Saint-Germain	Naples, Italy
21:00 CET (UTC+01:00)	Fabián (yellow card) 45+3'; Insigne 63' (pen.)	Report	Mbappé (yellow card) 29'; Kehrer (yellow card) 32'; Bernat 45+2'; Verratti (yellow card) 89'; Neymar (yellow card) 90+1'	Stadium: Stadio San Paolo; Attendance: 55,489; Referee: Björn Kuipers (Netherlands)

28 November 2018 5	Paris Saint-Germain (France)	2–1	(England) Liverpool	Paris, France
21:00 CET (UTC+01:00)	Bernat 13'; Verratti (yellow card) 24'; Neymar 37', (yellow card) 90+4'	Report	Wijnaldum (yellow card) 17'; Gomez (yellow card) 34'; Milner 45+1' (pen.); Sturridge (yellow card) 84'; Van Dijk (yellow card) 90+1'; Robertson (yellow card) 90+3'; Keïta (yellow card) 90+5'	Stadium: Parc des Princes; Attendance: 46,880; Referee: Szymon Marciniak (Poland)

11 December 2018 6	Red Star Belgrade (Serbia)	1–4	(France) Paris Saint-Germain	Belgrade, Serbia
21:00 CET (UTC+01:00)	Borjan (yellow card) 10'; Pavkov (yellow card) 28'; Gobeljić 56', (yellow card) 87'; Stojković (yellow card) 78'	Report	Cavani 10'; Kehrer (yellow card) 29'; Neymar 40'; Bernat (yellow card) 62'; Marquinhos 74'; Mbappé 90+2'	Stadium: Red Star Stadium; Attendance: 48,357; Referee: Willie Collum (Scotland)

==== Knockout phase ====
===== Round of 16 =====
12 February 2019 First leg	Manchester United (England)	0–2	(France) Paris Saint-Germain	Greater Manchester, England
21:00 CET (UTC+01:00)	Pogba (yellow card) 26' (yellow-red card) 89'; Young (yellow card) 30'; Lindelöf (yellow card) 50'; Herrera (yellow card) 87'; Shaw (yellow card) 90+2'	Report	Kimpembe (yellow card) 11', (goal) 53'; Draxler (yellow card) 19'; Bernat (yellow card) 34'; Mbappé 60'; Dani Alves (yellow card) 62'	Stadium: Old Trafford; Attendance: 74,054; Referee: Daniele Orsato (Italy)

6 March 2019 Second leg	Paris Saint-Germain (France)	1–3 (3–3 (a) agg.)	(England) Manchester United	Paris, France
21:00 CET (UTC+01:00)	Bernat 12'; Di María (yellow card) 34'; Paredes (yellow card) 75'	Report	Lukaku 2', 30'; Rashford 90+4' (pen.); Shaw (yellow card) 90+9'	Stadium: Parc des Princes; Attendance: 47,441; Referee: Damir Skomina (Slovenia)

== Statistics ==
=== Appearances and goals ===
No.	Pos	Nat	Player	Total		Ligue 1		Coupe de France		Coupe de la Ligue		Trophée des Champions		Champions League	
No.	Pos	Nat	Player	Apps	Goals	Apps	Goals	Apps	Goals	Apps	Goals	Apps	Goals	Apps	Goals
Goalkeepers
1	GK	(Italy) ITA	Gianluigi Buffon	25	0	17	0	1	0	0+1	0	1	0	5	0
16	GK	(France) FRA	Alphonse Areola	31	0	21	0	5	0	2	0	0	0	3	0
50	GK	(France) FRA	Sébastien Cibois	0	0	0	0	0	0	0	0	0	0	0	0
Defenders
2	DF	(Brazil) BRA	Thiago Silva	39	0	24+1	0	4	0	2	0	1	0	7	0
3	DF	(France) FRA	Presnel Kimpembe	36	1	23+1	0	3	0	1	0	0	0	7+1	1
4	DF	(Germany) GER	Thilo Kehrer	40	1	19+8	1	5	0	1	0	0	0	5+2	0
5	DF	(Brazil) BRA	Marquinhos	44	4	30	3	4	0	2	0	0+1	0	7	1
12	DF	(Belgium) BEL	Thomas Meunier	31	5	19+3	3	3	1	1	0	0	0	4+1	1
13	DF	(Brazil) BRA	Dani Alves	32	3	19+4	1	3+1	2	1+1	0	0	0	2+1	0
14	DF	(Spain) ESP	Juan Bernat	41	4	21+4	1	5+1	0	2	0	0	0	8	3
20	DF	(France) FRA	Layvin Kurzawa	21	1	11+8	1	2	0	0	0	0	0	0	0
31	DF	(France) FRA	Colin Dagba	22	0	9+8	0	1+2	0	0	0	1	0	0+1	0
34	DF	(France) FRA	Stanley N'Soki	15	0	8+4	0	1+1	0	0	0	1	0	0	0
36	DF	(France) FRA	Loïc Mbe Soh	2	0	2	0	0	0	0	0	0	0	0	0
Midfielders
6	MF	(Italy) ITA	Marco Verratti	38	1	23+3	0	3	1	0+1	0	1	0	7	0
8	MF	(Argentina) ARG	Leandro Paredes	22	0	14+2	0	2+2	0	0	0	0	0	0+2	0
11	MF	(Argentina) ARG	Ángel Di María	45	19	28+2	12	4	3	2	0	1	2	8	2
23	MF	(Germany) GER	Julian Draxler	46	5	22+9	3	5+1	2	2	0	0	0	3+4	0
24	MF	(France) FRA	Christopher Nkunku	29	4	13+9	3	2+3	0	1	0	1	1	0	0
25	MF	(France) FRA	Adrien Rabiot	20	2	12+2	2	0	0	0	0	1	0	3+2	0
Forwards
7	FW	(France) FRA	Kylian Mbappé	43	39	24+5	33	3+1	2	1+1	0	0	0	8	4
9	FW	(Uruguay) URU	Edinson Cavani	33	23	20+1	18	1+2	2	1+1	1	0	0	5+2	2
10	FW	(Brazil) BRA	Neymar	28	23	16+1	15	3	2	1	1	0+1	0	6	5
17	FW	(Cameroon) CMR	Eric Maxim Choupo-Moting	31	3	8+14	3	4	0	1	0	0	0	0+4	0
27	FW	(France) FRA	Moussa Diaby	33	4	10+15	2	2+3	1	1+1	1	0	0	0+1	0
33	FW	(Turkey) TUR	Metehan Güçlü	1	1	0+1	1	0	0	0	0	0	0	0	0
Players transferred out during the season
18	MF	(Argentina) ARG	Giovani Lo Celso	1	0	0+1	0	0	0	0	0	0	0	0	0
19	MF	(France) FRA	Lassana Diarra	4	0	2+1	0	0	0	0	0	1	0	0	0
21	FW	(United States) USA	Timothy Weah	3	2	1+1	1	0	0	0	0	1	1	0	0
22	FW	(Spain) ESP	Jesé	1	0	0	0	0+1	0	0	0	0	0	0	0
28	MF	(France) FRA	Antoine Bernede	3	0	2	0	0	0	0	0	0+1	0	0	0
37	DF	(France) FRA	Kévin Rimane	3	0	0+1	0	0+1	0	0	0	1	0	0	0

Last updated: 24 May 2019
Source: Competitions
