= Layvin Kurzawa =

French footballer (born 1992)

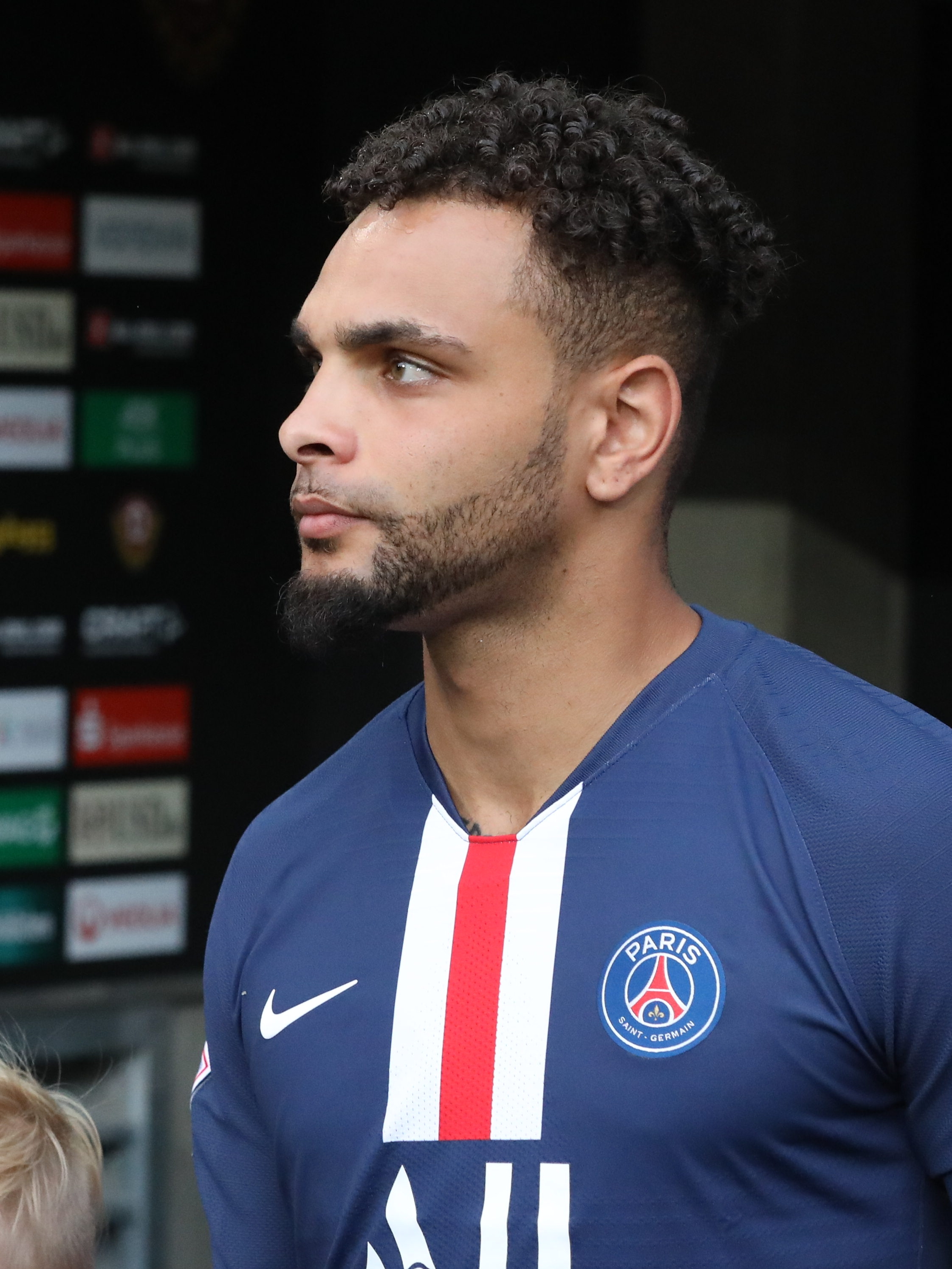
- Kurzawa with Paris Saint-Germain in 2019

Personal information
- Full name: Layvin Marc Kurzawa
- Date of birth: 4 September 1992 (age 34)
- Place of birth: Fréjus, France
- Height: 1.82 m (6 ft 0 in)
- Position: Left-back

Youth career
- 1996–2005: Stade Raphaëlois
- 2005–2007: Aix-en-Provence
- 2007–2010: Monaco

Senior career*
| Years | Team | Apps | (Gls) |
| 2010–2013 | Monaco B | 30 | (5) |
| 2010–2015 | Monaco | 75 | (6) |
| 2015–2024 | Paris Saint-Germain | 107 | (10) |
| 2022–2023 | → Fulham (loan) | 3 | (0) |
| 2025 | Boavista | 4 | (0) |
| 2026 | Persib Bandung | 7 | (0) |
| Total | | 226 | (21) |

International career
| 2010–2011 | France U19 | 8 | (0) |
| 2013 | France U20 | 2 | (0) |
| 2013–2014 | France U21 | 5 | (3) |
| 2014–2019 | France | 14 | (1) |
- * Club domestic league appearances and goals

Layvin Marc Kurzawa (born 4 September 1992) is a French former professional footballer who played as a left-back.

Kurzawa began his career at Monaco in 2010, and played 96 games for the team, scoring eight goals. In 2015, he joined Paris Saint-Germain for €23 million. Kurzawa won 16 domestic trophies with PSG, including four Ligue 1 titles. He made his senior international debut for France in 2014.

== Club career ==
=== Monaco ===
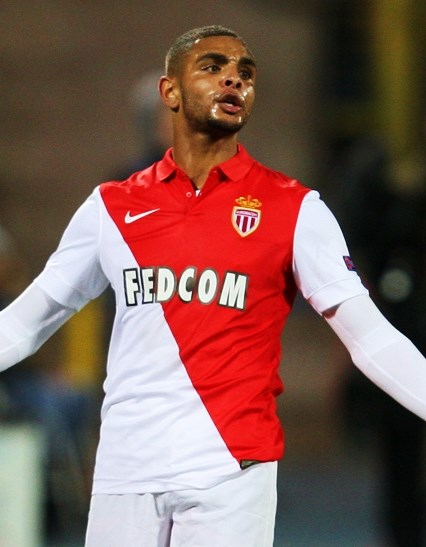
Kurzawa playing for Monaco in 2014

Kurzawa was born in Fréjus, France. He made his professional debut on 22 September 2010, soon after his 18th birthday, in a Coupe de la Ligue third round match against Lens at the Stade Louis II. He started the match and played 65 minutes before being substituted in a 1–0 victory. Three days later he made his Ligue 1 debut, starting in a 1–2 defeat at Lorient. Kurzawa played four more league matches, all of them starts, as the season ended with relegation to Ligue 2; he was sent off on 1 May 2011 in a 1–1 draw at Saint-Étienne. He made four appearances as they returned to the top flight at the first attempt as champions.

Kurzawa established himself in the first team for the 2013–14 season, with 28 league appearances as Monaco finished runner-up to Paris Saint-Germain. He also scored five goals, the first of his professional career confirming a 2–0 win at Guingamp on 14 December 2013.

He scored in each leg of Monaco's 7–1 aggregate win over Young Boys in the third qualifying round of the 2015–16 UEFA Champions League.

=== Paris Saint-Germain ===
On 27 August 2015, Kurzawa joined Ligue 1 champions Paris Saint-Germain for €23 million on a five-year contract. He made his PSG debut on 11 September, coming on for Maxwell in the 67th minute of an eventual 2–2 draw with Bordeaux at the Parc des Princes. He scored his first goal for the team from the capital on 25 October, opening a 4–1 home win over Saint-Étienne when set up by Marco Verratti.

Kurzawa scored and assisted Javier Pastore on 6 August 2016 as PSG won the Trophée des Champions against Lyon with a 4–1 win in Klagenfurt, Austria. Six days later, he recorded the team's first league goal of the new season, the game's only against Bastia. On 8 March 2017, he scored an own goal in a 6–1 loss to Barcelona in the last 16 of the Champions League; as Unai Emery's team squandered a 4–0 advantage from the first leg.

On 31 October 2017, Kurzawa scored his first career hat-trick against Anderlecht in the UEFA Champions League group phase. Kurzawa became the first defender in modern Champions League history to achieve this feat in the competition.

On 29 June 2020, Kurzawa signed a four-year contract extension with Paris Saint-Germain. On 13 September, Kurzawa was one of many players involved in a brawl in Le Classique, which resulted in five red cards. He was given a six-match suspension for his actions.

On 13 May 2024, Kurzawa announced his departure from PSG, having only appeared in one match throughout the 2023–24 season.

==== Loan to Fulham ====
On 1 September 2022, Kurzawa joined Premier League side Fulham on a season-long loan. Kurzawa scored his first goal for Fulham on 7 January 2023 against Hull City in the FA Cup 3rd round.

=== Boavista ===
On 12 February 2025, Kurzawa was one of nine players Boavista signed on free transfers, a day after FIFA lifted a transfer ban that had prevented the club from making signings in each of the past five transfer windows. He signed a deal that would run until the end of the season. On 14 February, he made his debut for Boavista, coming on as a substitute in a 1–0 loss against Estrela Amadora.

=== Persib Bandung ===
On 25 January 2026, Kurzawa signed for Indonesian club Persib Bandung. He chose 3 as his squad number. He made his debut on 11 February in the first leg of the AFC Champions League Two round of 16 tie against Thai club Ratchaburi.

=== Retirement ===
On 17 November 2026, Kurzawa announce official retirement from professional football at age 34 after 16 year as professional career.

== International career ==
Kurzawa was born to a Guadeloupean father, and a Polish mother, and was approached to play for the Poland national team.

He was a French youth international and has earned caps with the under-19 team. On 14 October 2014, during the final leg of the 2015 UEFA European Under-21 Championship qualification play-offs against Sweden, Kurzawa celebrated a goal for France by mocking the Swedish players with a salute. Shortly after, Sweden scored a goal and won the game 4–1, thus eliminating France from the 2015 UEFA European Under-21 Championship. Afterwards the Swedish players celebrated their victory by saluting, in direct reference to Kurzawa's celebration earlier.

On 14 November 2014, he made his full international debut, replacing Lucas Digne for the last 20 minutes of a 1–1 friendly draw with Albania in Rennes. Four days later, he made his first start, in a 1–0 friendly win over Sweden in Marseille, being substituted later on for Digne.

Kurzawa scored his first international goal on 1 September 2016, concluding a 3–1 friendly win over Italy at the Stadio San Nicola in Bari.

== Career statistics ==
=== Club ===
As of match played 10 May 2026

Appearances and goals by club, season and competition
| Club | Season | League | | | National cup (Note: Includes Coupe de France and FA Cup) | | League cup (Note: Includes Coupe de la Ligue) | | Continental | | Other | | Total | |
| Club | Season | Division | Apps | Goals | Apps | Goals | Apps | Goals | Apps | Goals | Apps | Goals | Apps | Goals |
|---|---|---|---|---|---|---|---|---|---|---|---|---|---|---|
| Monaco B | 2010–11 | CFA | 11 | 1 | — | | — | | — | | — | | 11 | 1 |
| Monaco B | 2011–12 | CFA | 8 | 0 | — | | — | | — | | — | | 8 | 0 |
| Monaco B | 2012–13 | CFA | 11 | 4 | — | | — | | — | | — | | 11 | 4 |
| Monaco B | Total | | 30 | 5 | — | | — | | — | | — | | 30 | 5 |
| Monaco | 2010–11 | Ligue 1 | 5 | 0 | 0 | 0 | 1 | 0 | — | | — | | 6 | 0 |
| Monaco | 2011–12 | Ligue 2 | 4 | 0 | 0 | 0 | 0 | 0 | — | | — | | 4 | 0 |
| Monaco | 2012–13 | Ligue 2 | 8 | 0 | 2 | 1 | 3 | 0 | — | | — | | 13 | 1 |
| Monaco | 2013–14 | Ligue 1 | 28 | 5 | 1 | 0 | 0 | 0 | — | | — | | 29 | 5 |
| Monaco | 2014–15 | Ligue 1 | 27 | 0 | 2 | 0 | 2 | 0 | 8 (Note: Appearance(s) in UEFA Champions League) | 0 | — | | 39 | 0 |
| Monaco | 2015–16 | Ligue 1 | 3 | 1 | — | | — | | 3 | 2 | — | | 6 | 3 |
| Monaco | Total | | 75 | 6 | 5 | 1 | 6 | 0 | 11 | 2 | — | | 97 | 9 |
| Paris Saint-Germain | 2015–16 | Ligue 1 | 16 | 3 | 4 | 0 | 4 | 0 | 1 | 0 | — | | 25 | 3 |
| Paris Saint-Germain | 2016–17 | Ligue 1 | 18 | 2 | 1 | 0 | 1 | 0 | 5 | 0 | 1 (Note: Appearance in Trophée des Champions) | 1 | 26 | 3 |
| Paris Saint-Germain | 2017–18 | Ligue 1 | 20 | 2 | 1 | 0 | 0 | 0 | 6 | 3 | 1 | 0 | 28 | 5 |
| Paris Saint-Germain | 2018–19 | Ligue 1 | 19 | 1 | 2 | 0 | 0 | 0 | 0 | 0 | 0 | 0 | 21 | 1 |
| Paris Saint-Germain | 2019–20 | Ligue 1 | 14 | 1 | 5 | 0 | 2 | 0 | 4 | 0 | 0 | 0 | 25 | 1 |
| Paris Saint-Germain | 2020–21 | Ligue 1 | 19 | 1 | 2 | 0 | — | | 5 | 0 | 1 | 0 | 27 | 1 |
| Paris Saint-Germain | 2021–22 | Ligue 1 | 0 | 0 | 0 | 0 | — | | 0 | 0 | 1 | 0 | 1 | 0 |
| Paris Saint-Germain | 2023–24 | Ligue 1 | 1 | 0 | 0 | 0 | — | | 0 | 0 | 0 | 0 | 1 | 0 |
| Paris Saint-Germain | Total | | 107 | 10 | 15 | 0 | 7 | 0 | 21 | 3 | 4 | 1 | 154 | 14 |
| Fulham (loan) | 2022–23 | Premier League | 3 | 0 | 3 | 2 | — | | — | | — | | 6 | 2 |
| Boavista | 2024–25 | Primeira Liga | 4 | 0 | — | | — | | — | | — | | 4 | 0 |
| Persib Bandung | 2025–26 | Super League | 7 | 0 | — | | — | | 2 (Note: Appearance(s) in AFC Champions League Two) | 0 | — | | 9 | 0 |
| Career total | | | 226 | 21 | 23 | 3 | 13 | 0 | 34 | 5 | 4 | 1 | 300 | 30 |

=== International ===
Appearances and goals by national team and year
| National team | Year | Apps | Goals |
|---|---|---|---|
| France | 2014 | 2 | 0 |
| France | 2015 | 0 | 0 |
| France | 2016 | 4 | 1 |
| France | 2017 | 5 | 0 |
| France | 2018 | 0 | 0 |
| France | 2019 | 2 | 0 |
| Total | | 13 | 1 |

France score listed first, score column indicates score after each Kurzawa goal

List of international goals scored by Layvin Kurzawa
| No. | Date | Venue | Cap | Opponent | Score | Result | Competition | Ref. |
|---|---|---|---|---|---|---|---|---|
| 1 | 1 September 2016 | Stadio San Nicola, Bari, Italy | 3 | Italy | 3–1 | 3–1 | Friendly | |

== Honours ==
Monaco

- Ligue 2: 2012–13

Paris Saint-Germain

- Ligue 1: 2015–16, 2017–18, 2018–19, 2019–20, 2023–24
- Coupe de France: 2015–16, 2016–17, 2017–18, 2019–20; runner-up: 2018–19
- Coupe de la Ligue: 2015–16, 2016–17, 2017–18, 2019–20
- Trophée des Champions: 2016, 2017, 2018, 2019, 2020
- UEFA Champions League runner-up: 2019–20

Persib Bandung

- Super League: 2025–26

Individual

- Ligue 1 Team of the Year: 2013–14
