= Presnel Kimpembe =

French footballer (born 1995)

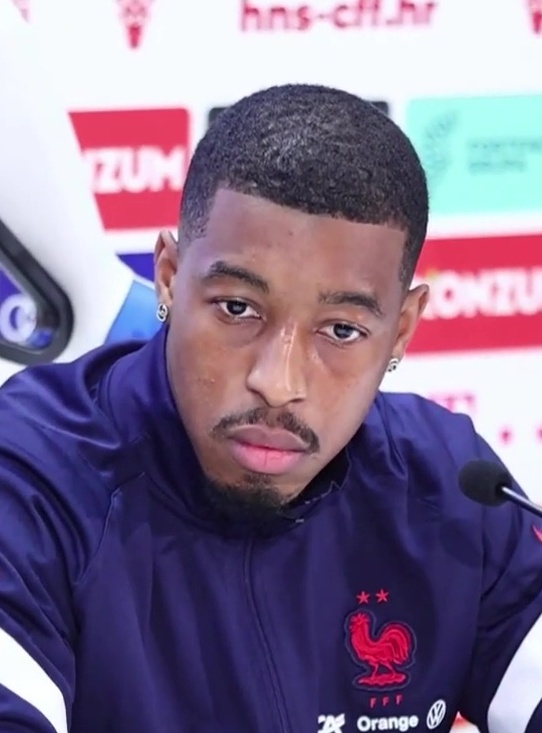
- Kimpembe with France in 2022

Personal information
- Full name: Presnel Kimpembe
- Date of birth: 13 August 1995 (age 31)
- Place of birth: Beaumont-sur-Oise, France
- Height: 1.82 m (6 ft 0 in)
- Position: Centre-back

Team information
- Current team: Al Kharaitiyat
- Number: 3

Youth career
- 2002–2005: AS Éragny
- 2005–2013: Paris Saint-Germain

Senior career*
Years	Team	Apps	(Gls)
2013–2016	Paris Saint-Germain B	41	(1)
2014–2025	Paris Saint-Germain	165	(1)
2025–2026	Qatar SC	9	(0)
2026–	Al Kharaitiyat	6	(1)

International career
2014	DR Congo U20	1	(0)
2015	France U20	7	(0)
2015–2016	France U21	11	(0)
2018–2022	France	28	(0)
Medal record
Men's football
Representing France
FIFA World Cup
Winner	2018 Russia
UEFA Nations League
Winner	2021 Italy
- * Club domestic league appearances and goals as of 5 November 2026 (UTC)

Presnel Kimpembe (born 13 August 1995) is a French professional footballer who plays as a centre-back for Qatari Second Division side Al Kharaitiyat.

A product of the Paris Saint-Germain Youth Academy, Kimpembe made his debut for Paris Saint-Germain (PSG) in 2014. With PSG, he went on to win eight Ligue 1 titles, numerous domestic cup competitions, and a UEFA Champions League title. Several long-term injuries in the later years of his spell at PSG led to his eventual departure for Qatar SC in 2025.

A senior international from 2018 to 2022, Kimpembe was a part of the French teams that won the 2018 FIFA World Cup and 2021 UEFA Nations League Finals, and was a prominent starter at UEFA Euro 2020. He was also included in the 2022 FIFA World Cup, but withdrew injured and was replaced by Axel Disasi.

== Early life ==
Kimpembe was born in Beaumont-sur-Oise, France, to a Congolese father and Haitian mother. He is named after his maternal grandfather.

== Club career ==
Kimpembe made his professional debut for Paris Saint-Germain (PSG) on 17 October 2014 against Lens, replacing Thiago Motta after 76 minutes in a 3–1 away win. He made his UEFA Champions League debut on 14 February 2017, keeping a clean sheet in a 4–0 win against Barcelona.

On 12 February 2019, Kimpembe scored his first goal for PSG against Manchester United in an away match at Old Trafford, turning home at the far-post from an Ángel Di María corner in the 53rd minute. However, in the return leg at Parc des Princes in Paris, he jumped to block a shot from Diogo Dalot in injury time that was given as a penalty for handball after the referee consulted VAR. PSG went on to lose the match 3–1, and were subsequently knocked out due to the away goals rule.

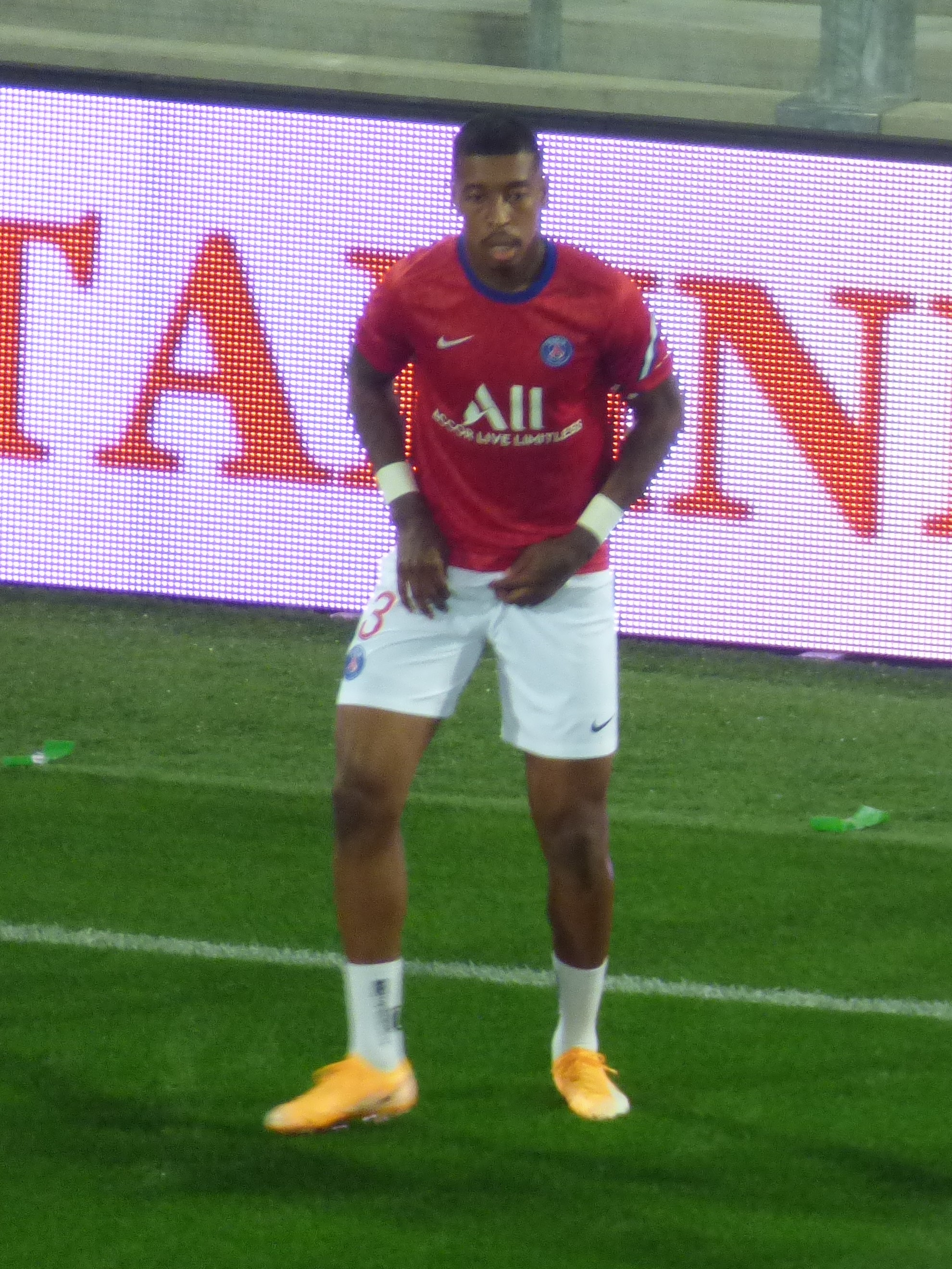
Kimpembe with Paris Saint-Germain in September 2020

On 11 July 2020, Kimpembe signed a contract extension with PSG, a deal lasting until 2024. In the 2019–20 UEFA Champions League, PSG went on to reach the final of the competition, losing 1–0 to Bayern Munich. Kimpembe participated in the match. On 3 January 2022, he scored his second goal for the club in a 4–0 Coupe de France win over Vannes. He also contributed an assist for a Kylian Mbappé goal. Kimpembe scored his first Ligue 1 goal in a 5–1 win away to Lille on 6 February 2022. During the 2021–22 season, Kimpembe had a 95.5% pass success rate, more than any other player across the top five leagues.

On 26 February 2023, Kimpembe was stretchered off the field after rupturing his achilles tendon in a 3–0 win over Le Classique rivals Marseille. The injury would require surgery, and came just two weeks after his return from a hamstring injury that had sidelined him for three months. On 20 December 2023, Kimpembe renewed his contract with PSG to 2026. In January 2024, he underwent an achilles tendon surgery, which kept him off the field for the entire 2023–24 season.

On 4 February 2025, Kimpembe made his return to play for PSG in a 2–0 win over Le Mans in the Coupe de France, almost two years after his injury.

On 7 September 2025, Paris Saint-Germain officially announced that Kimpembe has joined Qatar Stars League side Qatar SC, bringing an end to his 20-year journey with the club. After making 11 league appearances during the 2025–26 season, Kimpembe joined Al Kharaitiyat of the Qatari Second Division on a one-year contract in July 2026.

== International career ==
Kimpembe got his first call up to the senior France side after Eliaquim Mangala withdrew through injury for 2018 FIFA World Cup qualifiers against Bulgaria and Netherlands in October 2016.

In January 2018, William Gallas, former Arsenal and Chelsea player said that Kimpembe is the future of the French team. Kimpembe finally made his first team debut on 27 March 2018, a year and a half after his first call-up, in a friendly against Russia. He came on for Ousmane Dembélé in the 72nd minute of a 3–1 away victory.

On 17 May 2018, he was called up to the 23-man squad for the 2018 FIFA World Cup in Russia. Kimpembe won the tournament with France in 2018, a tournament in which he played a total of 90 minutes, against Denmark in the group stage.

On 18 May 2021, he was called up to the 26-man squad for the UEFA Euro 2020 tournament. He started in all four matches for France, playing in every minute of the tournament until their eventual defeat to Switzerland in the round of 16.

On 9 November 2022, he was named in the French squad for the 2022 FIFA World Cup in Qatar. On 14 November, he withdrew from the tournament injured and was replaced by Axel Disasi.

== Personal life ==
In July 2018, Kimpembe's name featured in the hit Vegedream single Ramenez la coupe à la maison. The line featuring his name, ‘Maestro Kimpembe (x7)', earned him the nickname 'Maestro'. Kimpembe provided the French voice acting for Spider-Man's enemy Scorpion in the 2018 Marvel film Spider-Man: Into the Spider-Verse. In June 2020, Kimpembe began his own streetwear collection called PK3 Paris. On 1 November 2021, he launched an auction for objects belonging to sportspeople for which the profits would be given to Médecins Sans Frontières in order to help the Haitian people. Kimpembe is a Muslim.

== Career statistics ==
=== Club ===
As of match played 5 November 2026

Appearances and goals by club, season and competition
Club	Season	League			National cup (Note: Includes Coupe de France)		League cup (Note: Includes Coupe de la Ligue and QSL Cup)		Continental (Note: All appearances in UEFA Champions League, unless otherwise noted)		Other		Total	
Club	Season	Division	Apps	Goals	Apps	Goals	Apps	Goals	Apps	Goals	Apps	Goals	Apps	Goals
Paris Saint-Germain B	2013–14	CFA	4	0	—		—		—		—		4	0
Paris Saint-Germain B	2014–15	CFA	23	0	—		—		—		—		23	0
Paris Saint-Germain B	2015–16	CFA	13	1	—		—		—		—		13	1
Paris Saint-Germain B	2016–17	CFA	1	0	—		—		—		—		1	0
Paris Saint-Germain B	Total		41	1	—		—		—		—		41	1
Paris Saint-Germain	2014–15	Ligue 1	1	0	0	0	0	0	0	0	0	0	1	0
Paris Saint-Germain	2015–16	Ligue 1	6	0	2	0	1	0	0	0	0	0	9	0
Paris Saint-Germain	2016–17	Ligue 1	19	0	4	0	3	0	1	0	1 (Note: Appearance in Trophée des Champions)	0	28	0
Paris Saint-Germain	2017–18	Ligue 1	28	0	4	0	3	0	3	0	0	0	38	0
Paris Saint-Germain	2018–19	Ligue 1	24	0	3	0	1	0	8	1	0	0	36	1
Paris Saint-Germain	2019–20	Ligue 1	16	0	0	0	2	0	10	0	0	0	28	0
Paris Saint-Germain	2020–21	Ligue 1	28	0	0	0	—		11	0	1	0	40	0
Paris Saint-Germain	2021–22	Ligue 1	30	1	3	1	—		7	0	1	0	41	2
Paris Saint-Germain	2022–23	Ligue 1	11	0	0	0	—		3	0	1	0	15	0
Paris Saint-Germain	2023–24	Ligue 1	0	0	0	0	—		0	0	0	0	0	0
Paris Saint-Germain	2024–25	Ligue 1	2	0	2	0	—		1	0	0	0	5	0
Paris Saint-Germain	Total		165	1	18	1	10	0	44	1	4	0	241	3
Qatar SC	2025–26	Qatar Stars League	9	0	0	0	0	0	—		—		9	0
Al Kharaitiyat	2026–27	Qatar Stars League 2	6	1	0	0	2	0	—		—		8	1
Career total			221	3	18	1	12	0	44	1	4	0	299	5

=== International ===
As of match played 13 June 2022

Appearances and goals by national team and year
National team	Year	Apps	Goals
France	2018	7	0
France	2019	2	0
France	2020	4	0
France	2021	12	0
France	2022	3	0
Total		28	0

== Honours ==
Paris Saint-Germain

- Ligue 1: 2014–15, 2015–16, 2017–18, 2018–19, 2019–20, 2021–22, 2022–23, 2024–25
- Coupe de France: 2014–15, 2015–16, 2016–17, 2017–18, 2019–20, 2020–21, 2024–25; runner-up: 2018–19
- Coupe de la Ligue: 2014–15, 2015–16, 2016–17, 2017–18, 2019–20
- Trophée des Champions: 2014, 2016, 2017, 2020, 2022,
- UEFA Champions League: 2024–25; runner-up: 2019–20

France

- FIFA World Cup: 2018
- UEFA Nations League: 2020–21

Individual

- UNFP Ligue 1 Team of the Year: 2020–21

Orders

- Knight of the Legion of Honour: 2018

== See also ==
- List of Paris Saint-Germain FC players
