= 2016 Trophée des Champions =

21st edition of the French Champions Cup

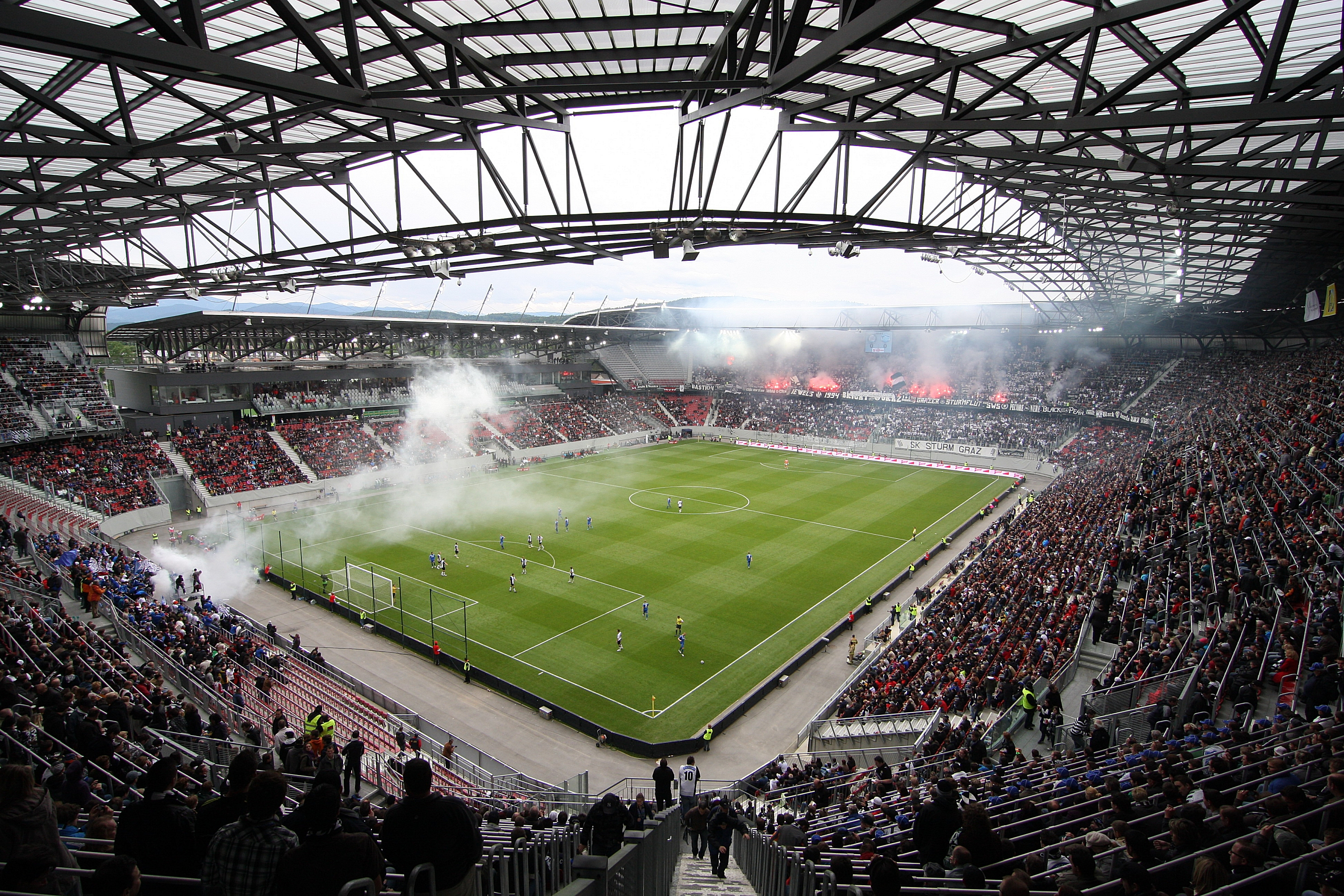
- The Wörthersee Stadion, in Klagenfurt, hosted the match.
- Event: Trophée des Champions
Paris Saint-Germain	Lyon
4	1
- Date: 6 August 2016
- Venue: Wörthersee Stadion, Klagenfurt, Austria
- Man of the Match: Ángel Di María (Paris Saint-Germain)
- Referee: Alexander Harkam (Austria)
- Attendance: 10,120

The 2016 Trophée des Champions (English: 2016 Champions Trophy) was the 21st edition of the French super cup. The match was contested by the 2015–16 Ligue 1 and Coupe de France champions Paris Saint-Germain, and the runners-up of Ligue 1, Lyon. The match was played at the Wörthersee Stadion in Klagenfurt, Austria.

PSG were the three-time defending champions, having defeated Lyon in the 2015 edition, which was played in Canada.

PSG won the match, beating Lyon 4–1.

== Match ==
=== Details ===
6 August 2016
20:45 CEST

Paris Saint-Germain	4–1	Lyon
Pastore 9'; Lucas 19'; Ben Arfa 34'; Kurzawa 54'	Report	Tolisso 87'

Wörthersee Stadion, Klagenfurt
Attendance: 10,120
Referee: Alexander Harkam (Austria)

Paris Saint-Germain	Lyon

GK	1	(Germany) Kevin Trapp
RB	19	(Ivory Coast) Serge Aurier
CB	32	(Brazil) David Luiz	(substituted off) 76'
CB	3	(France) Presnel Kimpembe
LB	20	(France) Layvin Kurzawa	(substituted off) 76'
CM	4	(France) Benjamin Stambouli
CM	8	(Italy) Thiago Motta (c)
RW	7	(Brazil) Lucas
AM	10	(Argentina) Javier Pastore
LW	11	(Argentina) Ángel Di María	(substituted off) 67'
CF	21	(France) Hatem Ben Arfa
Substitutes:
GK	16	(France) Alphonse Areola
DF	12	(Belgium) Thomas Meunier	(substituted on) 76'
DF	17	(Brazil) Maxwell	(substituted on) 76'
MF	6	(Italy) Marco Verratti	(substituted on) 67'
MF	14	(France) Blaise Matuidi
FW	29	(France) Jean-Kévin Augustin
FW	36	(France) Jonathan Ikoné
Manager:
(Spain) Unai Emery

GK	1	(Portugal) Anthony Lopes
RB	20	(Brazil) Rafael		(substituted off) 65'
CB	2	(France) Mapou Yanga-Mbiwa	(yellow card) 30'
CB	3	(Cameroon) Nicolas Nkoulou
LB	15	(France) Jérémy Morel
RM	14	(Spain) Sergi Darder		(substituted off) 76'
CM	21	(France) Maxime Gonalons (c)
LM	8	(France) Corentin Tolisso
RF	18	(France) Nabil Fekir
CF	10	(France) Alexandre Lacazette	(yellow card) 36'	(substituted off) 46'
LF	27	(France) Maxwel Cornet
Substitutes:
GK	30	(France) Mathieu Gorgelin
DF	5	(France) Mouctar Diakhaby
DF	13	(France) Christophe Jallet		(substituted on) 65'
MF	7	(France) Clément Grenier
MF	12	(France) Jordan Ferri		(substituted on) 76'
MF	25	(France) Houssem Aouar
MF	28	(France) Mathieu Valbuena		(substituted on) 46'
Manager:
(France) Bruno Génésio

Assistant referees:
Andreas Staudinger (England)
Andreas Witschnigg (England)
Fourth official:
Julian Weinberger (Hungary)

Match rules

- 90 minutes.
- Penalty shoot-out if scores level.
- Seven named substitutes, of which up to three may be used.

== See also ==
- 2016–17 Ligue 1
- 2016–17 Coupe de France
- 2016–17 Olympique Lyonnais season
- 2016–17 Paris Saint-Germain FC season
