= 2016–17 Paris Saint-Germain FC season =

47th season in existence of Paris Saint-Germain

Paris Saint-Germain
2016–17 season
- President: Nasser Al-Khelaifi
- Head coach: Unai Emery
- Stadium: Parc des Princes
- Ligue 1: 2nd
- Coupe de France: Winners
- Coupe de la Ligue: Winners
- Trophée des Champions: Winners
- UEFA Champions League: Round of 16
- Top goalscorer: League: Edinson Cavani (35); All: Edinson Cavani (49)
Home colours	Away colours	Third colours

The 2016–17 season was Paris Saint-Germain Football Club's 44th professional season since its creation in 1970, and its 43rd consecutive season in the top-flight of French football.

That was the club's first season without record goalscorer Zlatan Ibrahimović since the 2011–12 campaign.

== Players ==
French teams are limited to four players without EU citizenship. The squad list includes only the principal nationality of each player; several non-European players on the squad have dual citizenship with an EU country. Also, players from the ACP countries—countries in Africa, the Caribbean, and the Pacific that are signatories to the Cotonou Agreement—are not counted against non-EU quotas due to the Kolpak ruling.

=== Squad ===
Note: Flags indicate national team as defined under FIFA eligibility rules; some limited exceptions apply. Players may hold more than one non-FIFA nationality.

No.	Pos.	Nation	Player
1	GK	GER	Kevin Trapp
2	DF	BRA	Thiago Silva (captain)
3	DF	FRA	Presnel Kimpembe
4	MF	POL	Grzegorz Krychowiak
5	DF	BRA	Marquinhos
6	MF	ITA	Marco Verratti
7	MF	BRA	Lucas Moura
8	MF	ITA	Thiago Motta (vice-captain)
9	FW	URU	Edinson Cavani
10	MF	ARG	Javier Pastore
11	MF	ARG	Ángel Di María
12	DF	BEL	Thomas Meunier
14	MF	FRA	Blaise Matuidi

No.	Pos.	Nation	Player
15	FW	POR	Gonçalo Guedes
16	GK	FRA	Alphonse Areola
17	DF	BRA	Maxwell
18	MF	ARG	Giovani Lo Celso
19	DF	CIV	Serge Aurier
20	DF	FRA	Layvin Kurzawa
21	MF	FRA	Hatem Ben Arfa
23	MF	GER	Julian Draxler
24	MF	FRA	Christopher Nkunku
25	MF	FRA	Adrien Rabiot
29	FW	FRA	Jean-Kévin Augustin
40	GK	FRA	Rémy Descamps

== Transfers ==
=== In ===
- For Recent transfers: List of French football transfers winter 2016–17

No.	Pos	Player	Transferred from	Fee	Date
21	MF	(France) Hatem Ben Arfa	(France) Nice	Free transfer	1 July 2016
4	MF	(Poland) Grzegorz Krychowiak	(Spain) Sevilla	€25,000,000	3 Jul 2016
22	FW	(Spain) Jesé	(Spain) Real Madrid	€25,000,000	8 Aug 2016
12	DF	(Belgium) Thomas Meunier	(Belgium) Club Brugge	€7,000,000	3 July 2016
18	MF	(Argentina) Giovani Lo Celso	(Argentina) Rosario Central	€15,000,000	26 July 2016
23	MF	(Germany) Julian Draxler	(Germany) VfL Wolfsburg	€34,000,000	3 January 2017
15	FW	(Portugal) Gonçalo Guedes	(Portugal) Benfica	€30,000,000	25 January 2017

=== Out ===
Date	Pos.	Player	Age	Moving to	Fee
1 July 2016	FW	(Sweden) Zlatan Ibrahimović	34	(England) Manchester United	Free
4 July 2016	DF	(Netherlands) Gregory van der Wiel	28	(Turkey) Fenerbahçe	Free
13 July 2016	DF	(France) Lucas Digne	22	(Spain) Barcelona	€16,500,000
13 July 2016	FW	(France) Wilfried Kanga	18	(France) Créteil-Lusitanos	Loan
26 July 2016	MF	(Argentina) Giovani Lo Celso	20	(Argentina) Rosario Central	Loan
26 August 2016	GK	(Italy) Salvatore Sirigu	29	(Spain) Sevilla	Loan
26 August 2016	MF	(France) Benjamin Stambouli	26	(Germany) Schalke 04	Undisclosed
31 August 2016	DF	(Brazil) David Luiz	29	(England) Chelsea	€38,500,000
18 January 2017	MF	(France) Jonathan Ikoné	18	(France) Montpellier	Loan
24 January 2017	FW	(France) Hervin Ongenda	21	(Netherlands) Zwolle	€300,000
31 January 2017	FW	(Spain) Jesé	23	(Spain) Las Palmas	Loan
31 January 2017	GK	(Italy) Salvatore Sirigu	30	(Spain) Osasuna	Loan

== Pre-season and friendlies ==
=== Friendlies ===
13 July 2016 Friendly	Paris Saint-Germain	2–1	West Bromwich Albion	Schladming, Austria
18:10 CEST (UTC+2)	Rabiot 62'; Moura 79'	Report	David Luiz 15' (o.g.)	Stadium: Athletic Area; Referee: Harald Eisner (Austria)

4 January 2017 Friendly	Paris Saint-Germain	3–0	Club Africain	Radès, Tunisia
19:00 CET (UTC+1)	Nkunku 19'; Rabiot (yellow card) 82'; Di Maria 90+1'; Augustin 90+3'	Report		Stadium: Stade Olympique de Radès; Referee: Haythem Guirat (Tunisia)

=== International Champions Cup ===
Pos	Team	Pld	W	WP	LP	L	GF	GA	GD	Pts	Final result
1	(France) Paris Saint-Germain	3	3	0	0	0	10	2	+8	9	2016 ICC United States and Europe Champions
2	(England) Liverpool	3	2	0	0	1	6	1	+5	6	
3	(England) Chelsea	3	2	0	0	1	6	4	+2	6	
4	(Spain) Barcelona	3	2	0	0	1	7	7	0	6	
5	(Spain) Real Madrid	3	2	0	0	1	5	5	0	6	

Source: ICC
Rules for classification: 1) Points; 2) Goal difference; 3) Goals scored

24 July 2016 Match 1	Inter Milan	1–3	Paris Saint-Germain	Eugene (Oregon), United States
14:00 PDT (UTC−7)	Jovetić 45+3' (pen.)	Report	Aurier 14', 87'; Kimpembe (yellow card) 27'; Kurzawa 61'	Stadium: Autzen Stadium; Attendance: 24,147; Referee: Jair Marrufo (United States)

27 July 2016 Match 2	Real Madrid	1–3	Paris Saint-Germain	Columbus (Ohio), United States
19:30 EDT (UTC−4)	Marcelo 44' (pen.)	Report	Ikoné 2'; Thiago Silva (yellow card) 8'; Aurier (yellow card) 14'; Kurzawa (yellow card) 30'; Meunier 35', 40'; Stambouli (yellow card) 78'	Stadium: Ohio Stadium; Attendance: 86,641; Referee: Hilario Grajeda (United States)

30 July 2016 Match 3	Paris Saint-Germain	4–0	Leicester City	Carson (California), United States
20:30 PDT (UTC−7)	Cavani 26' (pen.); Ikoné 45'; Kimpembe (yellow card) 51'; Lucas 64'; Édouard 90'	Report	Hernández (yellow card) 9'	Stadium: StubHub Center; Attendance: 25,667; Referee: Ismail Elfath (United States)

== Competitions ==
=== Overview ===
Competition	First match	Last match	Starting round	Final position	Record							
Competition	First match	Last match	Starting round	Final position	Pld	W	D	L	GF	GA	GD	Win %
Ligue 1	12 August 2016	20 May 2017	Matchday 1	2nd	38	27	6	5	83	27	+56	71.05
Coupe de France	7 January 2017	27 May 2017	Round of 64	Winners	6	6	0	0	23	0	+23	100.00
Coupe de la Ligue	14 December 2016	1 April 2017	Round of 16	Winners	4	4	0	0	13	3	+10	100.00
Trophée des Champions	6 August 2016		Final	Winners	1	1	0	0	4	1	+3	100.00
Champions League	13 September 2016	8 March 2017	Group stage	Round of 16	8	4	3	1	18	13	+5	50.00
Total					57	42	9	6	141	44	+97	73.68

Last updated: 27 May 2017.
Source: Competitions

=== Trophée des Champions ===
6 August 2016 Final	Paris Saint-Germain	4–1	Lyon	Klagenfurt, Austria
20:45 CEST (UTC+2)	Pastore 9'; Lucas 19'; Ben Arfa 34'; Kurzawa 54'	Report	Yanga-Mbiwa (yellow card) 30'; Lacazette (yellow card) 36'; Tolisso 87'	Stadium: Wörthersee Stadion; Attendance: 10,120; Referee: Alexander Harkam (Austria)

=== Ligue 1 ===
==== League table ====
Pos	Team	Pld	W	D	L	GF	GA	GD	Pts	Qualification or relegation
1	Monaco (C)	38	30	5	3	107	31	+76	95	Qualification for the Champions League group stage
2	Paris Saint-Germain	38	27	6	5	83	27	+56	87	Qualification for the Champions League group stage
3	Nice	38	22	12	4	63	36	+27	78	Qualification for the Champions League third qualifying round
4	Lyon	38	21	4	13	77	48	+29	67	Qualification for the Europa League group stage (Note: Since the winners of the 2016–17 Coupe de France and the 2016–17 Coupe de la Ligue, Paris Saint-Germain, qualified for European competition based on league position, the spot awarded to the Coupe de France winners (Europa League group stage) was passed to the fourth-placed team and the spot awarded to the Coupe de la Ligue winners (Europa League third qualifying round) was passed to the sixth-placed team. The fifth-placed team received the spot in Europa League third qualifying round originally designated to the fourth-placed team.)
5	Marseille	38	17	11	10	57	41	+16	62	Qualification for the Europa League third qualifying round

Source: Ligue 1, Soccerway
Rules for classification: 1) Points; 2) Goal difference; 3) Goals scored; 4) Head-to-head goal difference; 5) Fairplay ranking.
(C) Champions

==== Results summary ====
Overall								Home						Away					
Pld	W	D	L	GF	GA	GD	Pts	W	D	L	GF	GA	GD	W	D	L	GF	GA	GD
38	27	6	5	83	27	+56	87	13	6	0	42	7	+35	14	0	5	41	20	+21

Last updated: 20 May 2017.
Source: Ligue1

==== Results by round ====
Round	1	2	3	4	5	6	7	8	9	10	11	12	13	14	15	16	17	18	19	20	21	22	23	24	25	26	27	28	29	30	31	32	33	34	35	36	37	38
Ground	A	H	A	H	A	H	A	H	A	H	A	H	H	A	H	A	H	A	H	A	A	H	A	H	A	H	A	H	A	H	H	A	A	H	A	H	A	H
Result	W	W	L	D	W	W	L	W	W	D	W	W	W	W	W	L	D	L	W	W	W	D	W	W	W	D	W	W	W	W	W	W	W	W	L	W	W	D
Position	8	2	5	7	3	2	4	3	2	3	3	3	3	3	2	3	3	3	3	3	3	3	2	2	2	2	2	2	2	2	2	2	2	2	2	2	2	2

Source: Ligue1
A = Away; H = Home; W = Win; D = Draw; L = Loss

==== Matches ====
12 August 2016 1	Bastia	0–1	Paris Saint-Germain	Bastia
20:00 CEST (UTC+2)	Cahuzac (yellow card) 22'; Squillaci (yellow card) 71'; Leca (yellow card) 90+3'	Report	Motta (yellow card) 35'; Kurzawa 74', (yellow card) 90+3'; Matuidi (yellow card) 90+3'	Stadium: Stade Armand-Cesari; Attendance: 13,122; Referee: Frank Schneider

21 August 2016 2	Paris Saint-Germain	3–0	Metz	Paris
20:45 CEST (UTC+2)	Aurier (yellow card) 31'; Lucas 52'; Kurzawa 67'; Verratti 90+4'	Report	Mandjeck (yellow card) 54'	Stadium: Parc des Princes; Attendance: 46,011; Referee: François Letexier

28 August 2016 3	Monaco	3–1	Paris Saint-Germain	Fontvieille, Monaco
20:45 CEST (UTC+2)	Moutinho 13'; Bakayoko (yellow card) 25'; Fabinho 45' (pen.); Aurier 80' (o.g.)	Report	Cavani (yellow card) 27', (goal) 63'; David Luiz (yellow card) 45'	Stadium: Stade Louis II; Attendance: 15,219; Referee: Ruddy Buquet

9 September 2016 4	Paris Saint-Germain	1–1	Saint-Étienne	Paris
20:45 CEST (UTC+2)	Verratti (yellow card) 25'; Lucas 67' (pen.); Krychowiak (yellow card) 71'	Report	Selnæs (yellow card) 39'; Saivet (yellow card) 56'; Malcuit (yellow card) 66'; Pogba (yellow card) 69'; Berić 90+3'	Stadium: Parc des Princes; Attendance: 44,327; Referee: Benoît Bastien

16 September 2016 5	Caen	0–6	Paris Saint-Germain	Caen
20:45 CEST (UTC+2)	Ben Youssef (yellow card) 22'	Report	Cavani 12', 23' (pen.), 38', 45+1'; Kimpembe (yellow card) 60'; Lucas 67'; Augustin 79'	Stadium: Stade Michel d'Ornano; Attendance: 18,977; Referee: Clément Turpin

20 September 2016 6	Paris Saint-Germain	3–0	Dijon	Paris
21:00 CEST (UTC+2)	Lang 15' (o.g.); Cavani 27' (pen.); Kimpembe (yellow card) 57'; Lucas 67'	Report		Stadium: Parc des Princes; Attendance: 42,484; Referee: Olivier Thual

23 September 2016 7	Toulouse	2–0	Paris Saint-Germain	Toulouse
20:45 CEST (UTC+2)	Toivonen (yellow card) 39'; Yago (yellow card) 45'; Bodiger 48' (pen.); Durmaz 79', (yellow card) 81'	Report	Aurier (yellow card) 24' (yellow-red card) 46'; Motta (yellow card) 75'	Stadium: Stadium Municipal; Attendance: 28,678; Referee: Frank Schneider

1 October 2016 8	Paris Saint-Germain	2–0	Bordeaux	Paris
17:00 CEST (UTC+2)	Cavani 3', 30'; Meunier (yellow card) 51'	Report	Pallois (yellow card) 87'	Stadium: Parc des Princes; Attendance: 44,949; Referee: Antony Gautier

15 October 2016 9	Nancy	1–2	Paris Saint-Germain	Tomblaine
17:00 CEST (UTC+2)	Diarra 55'; Cuffaut (yellow card) 70'	Report	Lucas 13'; Cavani 18'; Kimpembe (yellow card) 84'	Stadium: Stade Marcel Picot; Attendance: 19,524; Referee: Mikael Lesage

23 October 2016 10	Paris Saint-Germain	0–0	Marseille	Paris
20:45 CEST (UTC+2)		Report	Pelé (yellow card) 70'; Diarra (yellow card) 88'	Stadium: Parc des Princes; Attendance: 47,929; Referee: Clément Turpin

28 October 2016 11	Lille	0–1	Paris Saint-Germain	Lille
20:45 CEST (UTC+2)	Mavuba (yellow card) 54'; Civelli (yellow card) 79'	Report	Kurzawa (yellow card) 45'; Cavani 65'	Stadium: Stade Pierre-Mauroy; Attendance: 37,123; Referee: Benoît Bastien

6 November 2016 12	Paris Saint-Germain	4–0	Rennes	Paris
20:45 CET (UTC+1)	Fernandes 31' (o.g.); Cavani 43'; Marquinhos (yellow card) 61'; Rabiot 67'; Verratti 79'	Report	Mendes (yellow card) 48'; Pedro Henrique (yellow card) 51'	Stadium: Parc des Princes; Attendance: 42,002; Referee: Amaury Delerue

19 November 2016 13	Paris Saint-Germain	2–0	Nantes	Paris
17:00 CET (UTC+1)	Di María 13'; Jesé 90' (pen.)	Report	Thomasson (yellow card) 67'	Stadium: Parc des Princes; Attendance: 44,258; Referee: François Letexier

27 November 2016 14	Lyon	1–2	Paris Saint-Germain	Lyon
20:45 CET (UTC+1)	Ferri (yellow card) 45+2'; Valbuena 58'	Report	Ben Arfa (yellow card) 19'; Cavani 30' (pen.), 81'; Matuidi (yellow card) 43'; Motta (yellow card) 75'; Aurier (yellow card) 83'; Thiago Silva (yellow card) 86'; Verratti (yellow card) 89'	Stadium: Parc Olympique Lyonnais; Attendance: 55,107; Referee: Ruddy Buquet

30 November 2016 15	Paris Saint-Germain	2–0	Angers	Paris
21:00 CET (UTC+1)	Thiago Silva 34'; Cavani 66', (yellow card) 67'; Krychowiak (yellow card) 84'	Report	Diedhiou (yellow card) 80'	Stadium: Parc des Princes; Attendance: 40,597; Referee: Frank Schneider

3 December 2016 16	Montpellier	3–0	Paris Saint-Germain	Montpellier
17:00 CET (UTC+1)	Lasne 42'; Skhiri 48'; Boudebouz 80'	Report	Nkunku (yellow card) 18'; Cavani (yellow card) 58'	Stadium: Stade de la Mosson; Attendance: 17,132; Referee: Bartolomeu Varela

11 December 2016 17	Paris Saint-Germain	2–2	Nice	Paris
20:45 CET (UTC+1)	Kurzawa (yellow card) 41'; Cavani 46', 59'; Motta (yellow card) 77'	Report	Sarr (yellow card) 11'; Cyprien 32'; Pléa 45+3'; Balotelli (yellow card) 83'; Belhanda (yellow card) 90+3'	Stadium: Parc des Princes; Attendance: 47,665; Referee: Clément Turpin

17 December 2016 18	Guingamp	2–1	Paris Saint-Germain	Guingamp
17:00 CET (UTC+1)	Salibur 66'; De Pauw 70'	Report	Cavani 80'	Stadium: Stade de Roudourou; Attendance: 18,033; Referee: Fredy Fautrel

21 December 2016 19	Paris Saint-Germain	5–0	Lorient	Paris
20:50 CET (UTC+1)	Meunier 25'; Touré 44' (o.g.); Silva 50'; Cavani 63' (pen.); Lucas 70'	Report	Delecroix (yellow card) 62'	Stadium: Parc des Princes; Attendance: 44,844; Referee: Johan Hamel

14 January 2017 20	Rennes	0–1	Paris Saint-Germain	Rennes
17:00 CET (UTC+1)		Report	Verratti (yellow card) 29'; Draxler 39'; Motta (yellow card) 62'	Stadium: Roazhon Park; Attendance: 29,054; Referee: Benoît Bastien

21 January 2017 21	Nantes	0–2	Paris Saint-Germain	Nantes
17:00 CET (UTC+1)	Diego Carlos (yellow card) 65'; Pardo (yellow card) 69'	Report	Cavani 21', 65'; Verratti (yellow card) 30'	Stadium: Stade de la Beaujoire; Attendance: 32,858; Referee: Johan Hamel

29 January 2017 22	Paris Saint-Germain	1–1	Monaco	Paris
21:00 CET (UTC+1)	Cavani 81' (pen.)	Report	Sidibé (yellow card) 82'; Silva 90+2'	Stadium: Parc des Princes; Attendance: 47,238; Referee: Frank Schneider

4 February 2017 23	Dijon	1–3	Paris Saint-Germain	Dijon
20:00 CET (UTC+1)	Tavares 31'; Rüfli (yellow card) 53'	Report	Lucas 29'; Motta (yellow card) 32'; Thiago Silva 81'; Cavani 85'; Aurier (yellow card) 87'	Stadium: Stade Gaston Gérard; Attendance: 13,416; Referee: Amaury Delerue

7 February 2017 24	Paris Saint-Germain	2–1	Lille	Paris
21:00 CET (UTC+1)	Kimpembe (yellow card) 60'; Cavani 70'; Lucas 90+2'	Report	Benzia (yellow card) 30'; Corchia (yellow card) 83'; De Préville 86'; Enyeama (yellow card) 90+2'	Stadium: Parc des Princes; Attendance: 42,885; Referee: François Letexier

10 February 2017 25	Bordeaux	0–3	Paris Saint-Germain	Bordeaux
20:45 CET (UTC+1)		Report	Cavani 6', 47'; Motta (yellow card) 21'; Di María 40'	Stadium: Matmut Atlantique; Attendance: 37,823; Referee: Nicolas Rainville

19 February 2017 26	Paris Saint-Germain	0–0	Toulouse	Paris
21:00 CET (UTC+1)	Kimpembe (yellow card) 17'	Report	Adou (yellow card) 38'; Braithwaite (yellow card) 49'; Yago (yellow card) 72'	Stadium: Parc des Princes; Attendance: 45,492; Referee: Amaury Delerue

26 February 2017 27	Marseille	1–5	Paris Saint-Germain	Marseille
21:00 CET (UTC+1)	Evra (yellow card) 38'; Fanni 69'; Cabella (yellow card) 84'	Report	Marquinhos 6'; Cavani 16'; Verratti (yellow card) 29'; Lucas 50'; Draxler 61', (yellow card) 83'; Matuidi 72'	Stadium: Stade Vélodrome; Attendance: 65,252; Referee: Benoît Bastien

4 March 2017 28	Paris Saint-Germain	1–0	Nancy	Paris
17:00 CET (UTC+1)	Matuidi (yellow card) 46'; Kimpembe (yellow card) 61'; Cavani 80' (pen.)	Report	Maouassa (yellow card) 37'; Dia (yellow card) 45+3'; Koura (yellow card) 55'	Stadium: Parc des Princes; Attendance: 47,032; Referee: Antony Gautier

12 March 2017 29	Lorient	1–2	Paris Saint-Germain	Lorient
21:00 CET (UTC+1)	Ciani 69'; Moreira (yellow card) 72'; Peybernes (yellow card) 83'	Report	Jeannot 28' (o.g.); Nkunku 52', (yellow card) 76'	Stadium: Stade du Moustoir; Attendance: 13,643; Referee: Tony Chapron

19 March 2017 30	Paris Saint-Germain	2–1	Lyon	Paris
21:00 CET (UTC+1)	Rabiot (yellow card) 16', (goal) 34'; Cavani (yellow card) 20'; Draxler 40'	Report	Lacazette 6'; Gonalons (yellow card) 64'	Stadium: Parc des Princes; Attendance: 47,253; Referee: Clément Turpin

9 April 2017 31	Paris Saint-Germain	4–0	Guingamp	Paris
21:00 CEST (UTC+2)	Rabiot (yellow card) 32'; Di María 56'; Cavani 60', 71'; Matuidi 90+2'	Report	Deaux (yellow card) 62'; Coco (yellow card) 73'	Stadium: Parc des Princes; Attendance: 45,944; Referee: Ruddy Buquet

14 April 2017 32	Angers	0–2	Paris Saint-Germain	Angers
20:45 CEST (UTC+2)	Thomas (yellow card) 12'; Diedhiou (yellow card) 58'	Report	Verratti (yellow card) 12'; Di María 28', 84'	Stadium: Stade Raymond Kopa; Attendance: 15,909; Referee: Tony Chapron

18 April 2017 33	Metz	2–3	Paris Saint-Germain	Metz
18:30 CEST (UTC+2)	Diagne (yellow card) 42'; Jouffre 78'; Diabaté 88'	Report	Cavani 33'; Matuidi 36', 90+3'; Kimpembe (yellow card) 90+1'	Stadium: Stade Saint-Symphorien; Attendance: 20,693; Referee: Johan Hamel

22 April 2017 34	Paris Saint-Germain	2–0	Montpellier	Paris
17:00 CEST (UTC+2)	Cavani 29'; Di María 48', (yellow card) 68'	Report		Stadium: Parc des Princes; Attendance: 45,778; Referee: Mikael Lesage

30 April 2017 35	Nice	3–1	Paris Saint-Germain	Nice
21:00 CEST (UTC+2)	Dalbert (yellow card) 21'; Balotelli 26'; Seri (yellow card) 41'; Pereira 48'; Donis 90+2'	Report	Meunier (yellow card) 52'; Draxler (yellow card) 59'; Cavani (yellow card) 59'; Marquinhos 64'; Motta (red card) 90'; Di María (red card) 90+3'	Stadium: Allianz Riviera; Attendance: 33,190; Referee: Ruddy Buquet

6 May 2017 36	Paris Saint-Germain	5–0	Bastia	Paris
17:00 CEST (UTC+2)	Lucas 32'; Verratti 35'; Meunier (yellow card) 74'; Cavani 76', 89'; Marquinhos 82'	Report	Leca (yellow card) 35'; Mostefa (yellow card) 59'	Stadium: Parc des Princes; Attendance: 45,826; Referee: François Letexier

14 May 2017 37	Saint-Étienne	0–5	Paris Saint-Germain	Saint-Étienne
21:00 CEST (UTC+2)	Saivet (yellow card) 27'	Report	Cavani 2', 72'; Lucas 38', 78'; Lo Celso (yellow card) 85'; Draxler 90'	Stadium: Stade Geoffroy-Guichard; Attendance: 34,352; Referee: Amaury Delerue

20 May 2017 38	Paris Saint-Germain	1–1	Caen	Paris
21:00 CEST (UTC+2)	Rabiot 13'	Report	Diomandé (yellow card) 25'; Rodelin 90+1'	Stadium: Parc des Princes; Attendance: 45,516; Referee: Johan Hamel

=== Coupe de France ===
7 January 2017 Round of 64	Paris Saint-Germain	7–0	Bastia	Paris
21:00 CET (UTC+1)	Thiago Silva 31'; Rabiot 42'; Nkunku 48'; Motta 57'; Lucas 63' (pen.); Di María 77'; Matuidi (yellow card) 79'; Draxler 89'	Report	Marange (yellow card) 56'	Stadium: Parc des Princes; Attendance: 30,000; Referee: Jérôme Miguelgorry

1 February 2017 Round of 32	Rennes	0–4	Paris Saint-Germain	Rennes
21:00 CET (UTC+1)	Cavaré (yellow card) 23'; Mendes (yellow card) 74'	Report	Draxler 27', 68'; Lucas 38'; Ben Arfa (yellow card) 50', (goal) 90'	Stadium: Roazhon Park; Attendance: 21,524; Referee: Jérôme Miguelgorry

1 March 2017 Round of 16	Niort	0–2	Paris Saint-Germain	Niort
18:30 CET (UTC+1)	Agouazi (yellow card) 45+1'; Choplin (yellow card) 77'	Report	Kimpembe (yellow card) 54'; Pastore 78'; Cavani 90+4'	Stadium: Stade René Gaillard; Attendance: 9,333; Referee: Bartolomeu Varela

5 April 2017 Quarter-finals	Avranches	0–4	Paris Saint-Germain	Caen
21:05 CEST (UTC+2)	Michel (yellow card) 68'	Report	Ben Arfa 35', 53'; Lucas 56'; Kimpembe (yellow card) 63'; Pastore 82'	Stadium: Stade Michel d'Ornano; Attendance: 19,052; Referee: Jérôme Miguelgorry

26 April 2017 Semi-finals	Paris Saint-Germain	5–0	Monaco	Paris
21:05 CEST (UTC+2)	Draxler 26'; Cavani 31'; Mbaé 50' (o.g.); Matuidi 52'; Marquinhos 90'	Report	Diallo (yellow card) 84'	Stadium: Parc des Princes; Attendance: 47,298; Referee: Clément Turpin

27 May 2017 Final	Angers	0–1	Paris Saint-Germain	Saint-Denis
21:00 CEST (UTC+2)	Diedhiou (yellow card) 57'; Traoré (yellow card) 68'	Report	Di María (yellow card) 42'; Aurier (yellow card) 45+3'; Cissokho 90+1' (o.g.)	Stadium: Stade de France; Attendance: 80,000; Referee: Benoît Bastien

=== Coupe de la Ligue ===
14 December 2016 Round of 16	Paris Saint-Germain	3–1	Lille	Paris
21:05 CET (UTC+1)	Meunier (yellow card) 31'; Lucas 43' (pen.), 57'; Jesé 69'	Report	Maignan (yellow card) 42'; Terrier (yellow card) 51'; Sankharé (yellow card) 77'; Baša 89'	Stadium: Parc des Princes; Attendance: 45,183; Referee: Mikael Lesage

11 January 2017 Quarter-finals	Paris Saint-Germain	2–0	Metz	Paris
21:05 CET (UTC+1)	Thiago Silva 27', 72'	Report	Milán (yellow card) 41'	Stadium: Parc des Princes; Attendance: 43,857; Referee: Amaury Delerue

24 January 2017 Semi-finals	Bordeaux	1–4	Paris Saint-Germain	Bordeaux
21:00 CET (UTC+1)	Rolán 32'	Report	Di María 19', 81'; Cavani 60', 74'	Stadium: Matmut Atlantique; Attendance: 28,862; Referee: Clément Turpin

1 April 2017 Final	Monaco	1–4	Paris Saint-Germain	Décines-Charpieu
21:00 CEST (UTC+2)	Lemar 27'; Mendy (yellow card) 62'	Report	Draxler 4'; Di María 44'; Cavani 54', 90'; Kurzawa (yellow card) 56'; Trapp (yellow card) 66'	Stadium: Parc Olympique Lyonnais; Attendance: 57,841; Referee: Frank Schneider

=== UEFA Champions League ===
==== Group stage ====
Pos	Team	Pld	W	D	L	GF	GA	GD	Pts	Qualification	ARS	PAR	LUD	BSL
1	(England) Arsenal	6	4	2	0	18	6	+12	14	Advance to knockout phase	—	2–2	6–0	2–0
2	(France) Paris Saint-Germain	6	3	3	0	13	7	+6	12	Advance to knockout phase	1–1	—	2–2	3–0
3	(Bulgaria) Ludogorets Razgrad	6	0	3	3	6	15	−9	3	Transfer to Europa League	2–3	1–3	—	0–0
4	(Switzerland) Basel	6	0	2	4	3	12	−9	2		1–4	1–2	1–1	—

Source: UEFA
Rules for classification: Group stage tiebreakers

13 September 2016 1	Paris Saint-Germain (France)	1–1	(England) Arsenal	Paris, France
20:45 CEST (UTC+2)	Cavani 1'; Verratti (yellow card) 8' (yellow-red card) 90+3'; Motta (yellow card) 90'	Report	Coquelin (yellow card) 24'; Sánchez 78'; Giroud (yellow card) 88' (yellow-red card) 90+3'	Stadium: Parc des Princes; Attendance: 46,440; Referee: Viktor Kassai (Hungary)

28 September 2016 2	Ludogorets Razgrad (Bulgaria)	1–3	(France) Paris Saint-Germain	Sofia, Bulgaria
21:45 EEST (UTC+3); 20:45 CEST (UTC+2)	Natanael 16', (yellow card) 50'; Dyakov (yellow card) 44'; Cafu (yellow card) 56'	Report	Matuidi 41', (yellow card) 57'; Cavani 56', 60'; Motta (yellow card) 58'	Stadium: Vasil Levski National Stadium; Attendance: 17,155; Referee: Pavel Královec (Czech Republic)

19 October 2016 3	Paris Saint-Germain (France)	3–0	(Switzerland) Basel	Paris, France
20:45 CEST (UTC+2)	Di María 40'; Lucas 62'; Rabiot (yellow card) 64'; Cavani 90+3' (pen.)	Report	Steffen (yellow card) 66'; Lang (yellow card) 76'	Stadium: Parc des Princes; Attendance: 46,488; Referee: Deniz Aytekin (Germany)

1 November 2016 4	Basel (Switzerland)	1–2	(France) Paris Saint-Germain	Basel, Switzerland
20:45 CET (UTC+1)	Steffen (yellow card) 45+2'; Zuffi 76'; Dié (yellow card) 78' (yellow-red card) 84'	Report	Matuidi 43'; Verratti (yellow card) 86'; Kurzawa (yellow card) 88'; Meunier 90'	Stadium: St. Jakob-Park; Attendance: 34,639; Referee: Ovidiu Hațegan (Romania)

23 November 2016 5	Arsenal (England)	2–2	(France) Paris Saint-Germain	London, England
19:45 GMT (UTC); 20:45 CET (UTC+1)	Coquelin (yellow card) 34'; Giroud 45+1' (pen.); Koscielny (yellow card) 53'; Verratti 60' (o.g.)	Report	Cavani 18'; Marquinhos (yellow card) 31'; Verratti (yellow card) 55'; Iwobi 77' (o.g.)	Stadium: Emirates Stadium; Attendance: 59,628; Referee: Felix Brych (Germany)

6 December 2016 6	Paris Saint-Germain (France)	2–2	(Bulgaria) Ludogorets Razgrad	Paris, France
20:45 CET (UTC+1)	Motta (yellow card) 17'; Cavani 61'; Di María 90+2'	Report	Misidjan 15'; Wanderson 69'	Stadium: Parc des Princes; Attendance: 42,650; Referee: Anastasios Sidiropoulos (Greece)

==== Knockout phase ====
===== Round of 16 =====
14 February 2017 First leg	Paris Saint-Germain (France)	4–0	(Spain) Barcelona	Paris, France
20:45 CET (UTC+1)	Rabiot (yellow card) 3'; Di María 18', 55'; Draxler 40'; Cavani 72'	Report	Gomes (yellow card) 33'; Busquets (yellow card) 62'; Rafinha (yellow card) 74'	Stadium: Parc des Princes; Attendance: 46,484; Referee: Szymon Marciniak (Poland)

8 March 2017 Second leg	Barcelona (Spain)	6–1 (6–5 agg.)	(France) Paris Saint-Germain	Barcelona, Spain
20:45 CET (UTC+1)	L. Suárez 3', (yellow card) 67'; Piqué (yellow card) 23'; Busquets (yellow card) 36'; Kurzawa 40' (o.g.); Messi 50' (pen.); Rakitić (yellow card) 61'; Neymar (yellow card) 64', (goal) 88', 90+1' (pen.); Roberto 90+5'	Report	Matuidi (yellow card) 5'; Draxler (yellow card) 14'; Cavani (yellow card) 42', (goal) 62'; Marquinhos (yellow card) 90'; Verratti (yellow card) 90+4'	Stadium: Camp Nou; Attendance: 96,290; Referee: Deniz Aytekin (Germany)

== Statistics ==
=== Appearances and goals ===
No.	Pos	Nat	Player	Total		Ligue 1		Coupe de France		Coupe de la Ligue		Trophée des Champions		Champions League	
No.	Pos	Nat	Player	Apps	Goals	Apps	Goals	Apps	Goals	Apps	Goals	Apps	Goals	Apps	Goals
Goalkeepers
1	GK	(Germany) GER	Kevin Trapp	31	0	24	0	1	0	3	0	1	0	2	0
16	GK	(France) FRA	Alphonse Areola	27	0	14+1	0	5	0	1	0	0	0	6	0
40	GK	(France) FRA	Rémy Descamps	0	0	0	0	0	0	0	0	0	0	0	0
Defenders
2	DF	(Brazil) BRA	Thiago Silva	40	6	27	3	3	1	3	2	0	0	7	0
3	DF	(France) FRA	Presnel Kimpembe	28	0	19	0	3+1	0	3	0	1	0	1	0
5	DF	(Brazil) BRA	Marquinhos	44	4	27+2	3	5	1	2	0	0	0	8	0
12	DF	(Belgium) BEL	Thomas Meunier	36	2	18+4	1	4	0	3	0	0+1	0	5+1	1
17	DF	(Brazil) BRA	Maxwell	33	0	19+1	0	5	0	3	0	0+1	0	4	0
19	DF	(Ivory Coast) CIV	Serge Aurier	32	0	21+1	0	3	0	1	0	1	0	3+2	0
20	DF	(France) FRA	Layvin Kurzawa	26	3	18	2	1	0	1	0	1	1	4+1	0
31	DF	(France) FRA	Alec Georgen	1	0	0	0	0	0	0+1	0	0	0	0	0
Midfielders
4	MF	(Poland) POL	Grzegorz Krychowiak	19	0	7+4	0	1	0	1	0	0	0	2+4	0
6	MF	(Italy) ITA	Marco Verratti	43	3	25+3	3	2+1	0	4	0	0+1	0	7	0
8	MF	(Italy) ITA	Thiago Motta	42	1	25+5	0	4	1	1+1	0	1	0	4+1	0
10	MF	(Argentina) ARG	Javier Pastore	23	3	9+6	0	1+3	2	0+1	0	1	1	0+2	0
11	MF	(Argentina) ARG	Ángel Di María	43	14	24+5	6	2+1	1	3	3	1	0	6+1	4
14	MF	(France) FRA	Blaise Matuidi	52	7	26+8	4	5+1	1	1+3	0	0	0	8	2
18	MF	(Argentina) ARG	Giovani Lo Celso	5	0	1+3	0	0+1	0	0	0	0	0	0	0
21	MF	(France) FRA	Hatem Ben Arfa	32	4	5+18	0	3	3	0+2	0	1	1	1+2	0
23	MF	(Germany) GER	Julian Draxler	25	10	12+5	4	4+1	4	1	1	0	0	2	1
24	MF	(France) FRA	Christopher Nkunku	16	2	5+3	1	4	1	2+1	0	0	0	0+1	0
25	MF	(France) FRA	Adrien Rabiot	39	4	20+7	3	3+1	1	3	0	0	0	4+1	0
34	MF	(France) FRA	Lorenzo Callegari	1	0	0+1	0	0	0	0	0	0	0	0	0
Forwards
7	FW	(Brazil) BRA	Lucas Moura	53	19	29+8	12	3+2	3	2+1	2	1	1	6+1	1
9	FW	(Uruguay) URU	Edinson Cavani	50	49	35+1	35	2+1	2	3	4	0	0	8	8
15	FW	(Portugal) POR	Gonçalo Guedes	11	0	1+6	0	1+3	0	0	0	0	0	0	0
29	FW	(France) FRA	Jean-Kévin Augustin	13	1	1+9	1	1	0	1	0	0	0	0+1	0
Players transferred out during the season
22	FW	(Spain) ESP	Jesé	14	2	1+8	1	0	0	1	1	0	0	0+4	0
35	FW	(France) FRA	Hervin Ongenda	0	0	0	0	0	0	0	0	0	0	0	0
36	MF	(France) FRA	Jonathan Ikoné	7	0	2+2	0	0	0	1+1	0	0	0	0+1	0
—	DF	(Brazil) BRA	David Luiz	4	0	3	0	0	0	0	0	1	0	0	0
—	MF	(France) FRA	Benjamin Stambouli	1	0	0	0	0	0	0	0	1	0	0	0

Last updated: 27 May 2017
Source: Competitions
