= Jonathan Ikoné =

French footballer (born 1998)

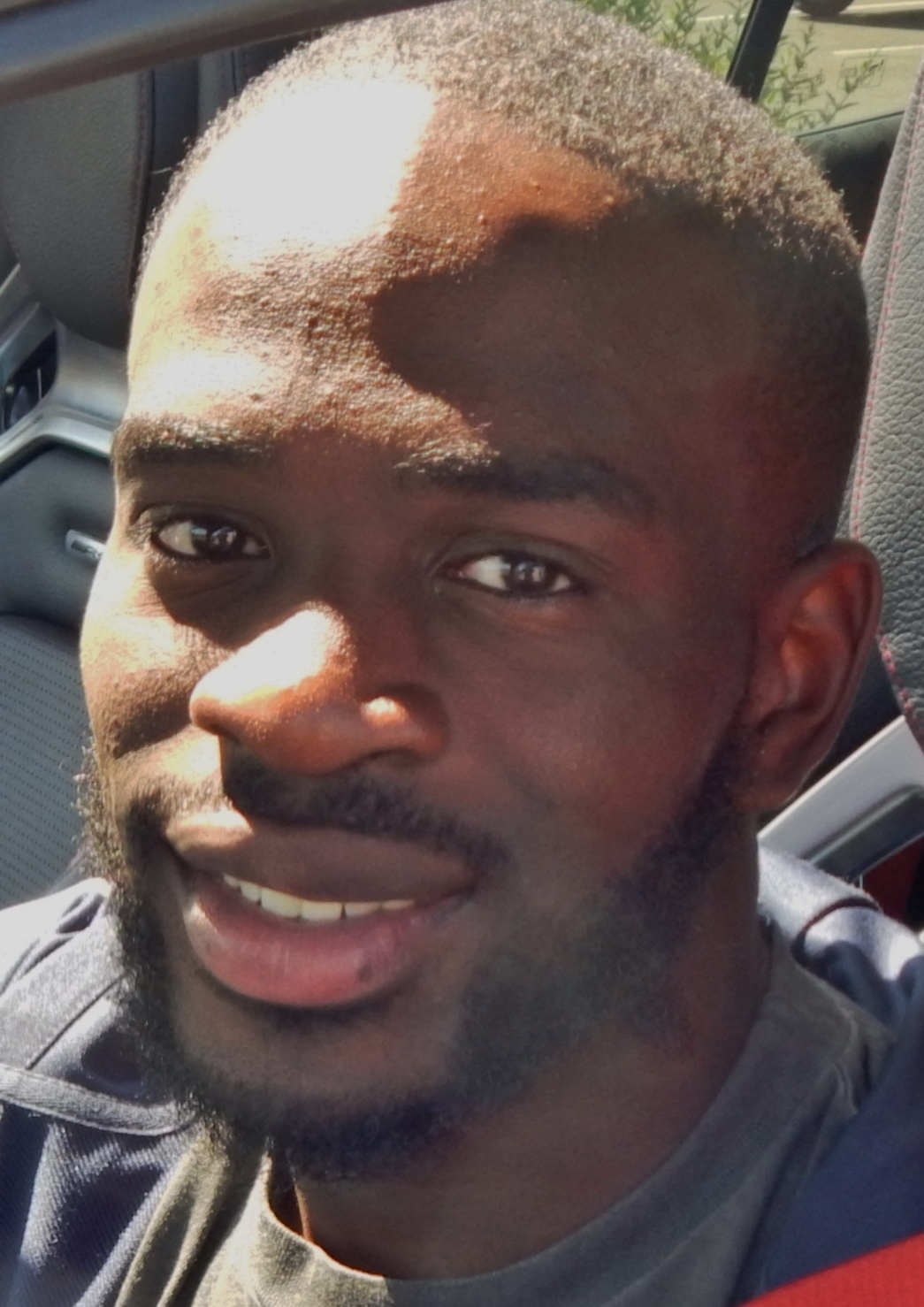
- Ikoné in 2018

Personal information
- Full name: Nanitamo Jonathan Ikoné
- Date of birth: 2 May 1998 (age 28)
- Place of birth: Bondy, France
- Height: 1.75 m (5 ft 9 in)
- Positions: Forward; wide midfielder

Team information
- Current team: Paris FC
- Number: 93

Youth career
- 2004–2010: AS Bondy
- 2010–2016: Paris Saint-Germain

Senior career*
Years	Team	Apps	(Gls)
2015–2016	Paris Saint-Germain II	19	(4)
2016–2018	Paris Saint-Germain	4	(0)
2017–2018	→ Montpellier (loan)	32	(2)
2017–2018	→ Montpellier B (loan)	5	(4)
2018–2022	Lille	121	(11)
2022–2025	Fiorentina	92	(8)
2025	→ Como (loan)	12	(2)
2025–	Paris FC	23	(3)

International career
2013–2014	France U16	9	(7)
2014–2015	France U17	14	(6)
2015–2016	France U18	6	(2)
2016–2017	France U19	10	(3)
2017	France U20	1	(1)
2017–2021	France U21	18	(4)
2019	France	4	(1)
Medal record
Representing France
UEFA European Under-17 Championship
Winner	Bulgaria 2015
- * Club domestic league appearances and goals as of 19 May 2026

Nanitamo Jonathan Ikoné (born 2 May 1998) is a French professional footballer who plays as a forward or wide midfielder for French Ligue 1 club Paris FC.

Ikoné scored one goal in four appearances for the France national team in 2019.

== Club career ==
=== Paris Saint-Germain ===
Ikone made his professional debut on 28 September 2016 in the UEFA Champions League against Ludogorets replacing Ángel Di María after 88 minutes in a 1–3 away win. He made his Ligue 1 debut three days later against Bordeaux, once again coming on in place of Di María after 88 minutes in a 2–0 home win.

==== Loan to Montpellier ====
On 18 January 2017, Ikoné was loaned to fellow Ligue 1 side Montpellier for the rest of the season. He made his debut against Metz three days later and played the whole match.

=== Lille ===
On 1 July 2018, Ikoné joined Ligue 1 side Lille on a five-year contract.

=== Fiorentina ===
On 31 December 2021, Ikoné signed for Serie A club Fiorentina, effective from 3 January 2022. The deal was worth a reported €15 million.

==== Loan to Como ====
On 31 January 2025, Ikoné moved on loan to Como, with an option to buy.

In July 2025, Botafogo showed interest in the French striker, who was then on loan to Como 1907.

=== Paris FC ===
On 1 September 2025, Ikone signed for French Ligue 1 side Paris FC until 2027, the deal was worth €2 million. Later that year, on 20 December, he netted his first goals for the club by scoring a hat-trick in a 3–0 away win over US Raon-l'Étape in the Coupe de France.

On 12 January 2026, Ikone score the only goal in a 1–0 away win over his former club Paris Saint-Germain during the Coupe de France round of 32, securing his club's first ever win in the Paris derby.

== International career ==
Ikoné was born in France and is of DR Congolese descent. He is a youth international footballer for France. He was called up to the senior France squad for games against Albania and Andorra in September 2019. He scored on his debut on 7 September against Albania after coming on as a 77th-minute substitute for Kingsley Coman.

== Career statistics ==
=== Club ===
As of match played 17 May 2026

Appearances and goals by club, season and competition
Club	Season	League			National cup (Note: Includes Coupe de France, Coppa Italia)		League cup (Note: Includes Coupe de la Ligue)		Europe		Other		Total	
Club	Season	Division	Apps	Goals	Apps	Goals	Apps	Goals	Apps	Goals	Apps	Goals	Apps	Goals
Paris Saint-Germain	2016–17	Ligue 1	4	0	0	0	2	0	1 (Note: Appearance(s) in UEFA Champions League)	0	0	0	7	0
Montpellier (loan)	2016–17	Ligue 1	14	1	—		—		—		—		14	1
Montpellier (loan)	2017–18	Ligue 1	18	1	2	1	3	0	—		—		23	2
Montpellier (loan)	Total		32	2	2	1	3	0	—		—		37	3
Lille	2018–19	Ligue 1	38	3	2	0	1	0	—		—		41	3
Lille	2019–20	Ligue 1	28	3	2	0	2	0	4	1	—		36	4
Lille	2020–21	Ligue 1	37	4	3	0	—		8 (Note: Appearances in UEFA Europa League)	3	—		48	7
Lille	2021–22	Ligue 1	18	1	1	0	—		5	1	1 (Note: Appearance in Trophée des Champions)	0	25	2
Lille	Total		121	11	8	0	3	0	17	5	1	0	150	16
Fiorentina	2021–22	Serie A	17	1	4	0	—		—		—		21	1
Fiorentina	2022–23	Serie A	33	4	5	1	—		13 (Note: Appearances in UEFA Europa Conference League)	1	—		51	6
Fiorentina	2023–24	Serie A	28	3	3	0	—		11	2	1 (Note: Appearance in Supercoppa Italiana)	0	43	5
Fiorentina	2024–25	Serie A	15	0	1	0	—		8 (Note: Appearance in UEFA Conference League)	4	—		24	4
Fiorentina	Total		93	8	13	1	—		32	7	1	0	139	16
Como (loan)	2024–25	Serie A	12	2	—		—		—		—		12	2
Paris FC	2025–26	Ligue 1	23	3	3	4	—		—		—		26	7
Career total			285	26	26	6	8	0	50	12	2	0	361	44

=== International ===
As of match played 14 October 2019

Appearances and goals by national team and year
National team	Year	Apps	Goals
France	2019	4	1
Total		4	1

Scores and results list France's goal tally first.

List of international goals scored by Jonathan Ikoné
No.	Date	Venue	Opponent	Score	Result	Competition
1	7 September 2019	Stade de France, Saint-Denis, France	Albania	4–0	4–1	UEFA Euro 2020 qualification

== Honours ==
Paris Saint-Germain

- Trophée des Champions: 2016

Lille

- Ligue 1: 2020–21
- Trophée des Champions: 2021

Fiorentina

- Coppa Italia runner-up: 2022–23
- UEFA Conference League runner-up: 2022–23, 2023–24

France U17

- UEFA European Under-17 Championship: 2015

Individual

- UEFA European Under-17 Championship Team of the Tournament: 2015
