= Javier Pastore =

Argentine footballer (born 1989)

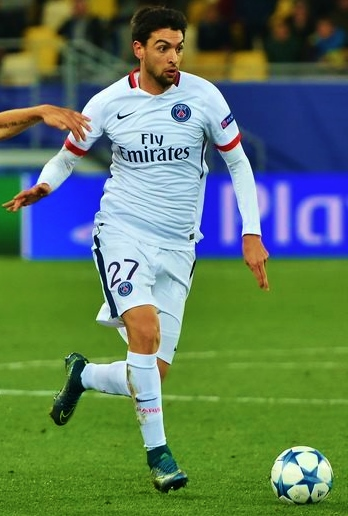
- Pastore playing for Paris Saint-Germain in 2015

Personal information
- Full name: Javier Matías Pastore
- Date of birth: 20 June 1989 (age 37)
- Place of birth: Córdoba, Argentina
- Height: 1.87 m (6 ft 2 in)
- Position: Attacking midfielder

Youth career
- 2002–2007: Talleres

Senior career*
| Years | Team | Apps | (Gls) |
| 2007–2008 | Talleres | 5 | (0) |
| 2008–2009 | Huracán | 31 | (8) |
| 2009–2011 | Palermo | 69 | (14) |
| 2011–2018 | Paris Saint-Germain | 186 | (29) |
| 2018–2021 | Roma | 30 | (3) |
| 2021–2023 | Elche | 14 | (0) |
| 2023 | Qatar SC | 7 | (1) |
| Total | | 342 | (55) |

International career
| 2010–2017 | Argentina | 29 | (2) |
Medal record
Men's football
Representing Argentina
Copa América
| Runner-up | 2015 Chile |
| Runner-up | 2016 United States |
- * Club domestic league appearances and goals

Javier Matías Pastore (Spanish pronunciation: [xaˈβjeɾ maˈti.as pasˈtoɾe]; born 20 June 1989) is an Argentine football agent and former professional footballer who played as an attacking midfielder and was renowned for his vision, passing, and dribbling ability.

Pastore began his club career with Talleres and then Huracán in his native Argentina before moving to Serie A team Palermo in 2009 for a reported transfer fee of €4.7 million. In 2011, French side Paris Saint-Germain bought him for a reported €39.8 million. He won numerous domestic honours with the club, including five Ligue 1 titles, before joining Roma in 2018 for a fee of €24.7 million. He later had brief spells with Spanish club Elche and Qatari side Qatar SC before retiring.

At international level, Pastore made his senior debut in 2010, and went on to make over 20 appearances for his country. He represented Argentina at the 2010 FIFA World Cup, and at three editions of the Copa América, reaching consecutive finals of the latter competition in 2015 and 2016.

== Club career ==
=== Early life ===
Pastore was born in Córdoba in an Italian-Argentine family originally from Volvera, Turin. He started his career in the youth system of the Argentine club Talleres, and slowly worked his way up to the first team. In 2007, he made his debut in the Argentine second division under the wing of manager Ricardo Gareca. In 2007, he only managed to play five games.

=== Huracán ===
During the 2008 season, Pastore was loaned to Huracán of the Argentine Primera. He made his professional debut for Huracán on 24 May 2008 in a 1–0 loss to River Plate. In the 2009 Clausura championship, he established himself as a regular first-team player for the club under the management of Ángel Cappa. This was his breakthrough tournament, where his side narrowly missed out on the championship title. His performance against River Plate was particularly lauded, where he opened the scoring with a 25-yard shot and then scored again with a piece of individual brilliance, helping Huracán win 4–0 in the club's biggest win against River Plate in over 60 years. He ended up as the team's top scorer with seven goals and three assists. Pastore and teammate Matías De Federico were integral to Huracán's title challenge that season.

=== Palermo ===
On 11 July 2009 Palermo formally announced the signing of Pastore for five years until 30 June 2014, with the transfer fee listed at approximately €4.7 million. Before his move to Palermo, the player was also linked to number of other top European clubs, including Manchester United, Porto, Milan and Chelsea.

Pastore's debut was on 15 August in the Coppa Italia, while his debut in Serie A came eight days later. His breakthrough game was on 4 October against Juventus, when he assisted Edinson Cavani's goal in a 2–0 win, appearing on all the websites and national newspapers. He scored his first Serie A goal on 30 January 2010 in a 2–4 away defeat to Bari. In his first season at Palermo, Pastore proved himself as being a promising but inexperienced youngster, playing mostly as a second-half substitute under head coaches Walter Zenga and, later, Delio Rossi.

Pastore then established himself as a regular under the tutelage of Rossi, usually playing in a role behind the regular striking duo of Fabrizio Miccoli and Edinson Cavani. Thanks to his performances, all praised by fans and pundits, Palermo finished off the season in fifth place, thus qualifying for the UEFA Europa League. In the 2010–11 season, on 14 November, Pastore scored his first career hat-trick in a derby match against Catania. On 30 July 2011, Palermo club president Maurizio Zamparini revealed that a fee had been agreed over Javier Pastore's transfer to Paris Saint-Germain.

=== Paris Saint-Germain ===
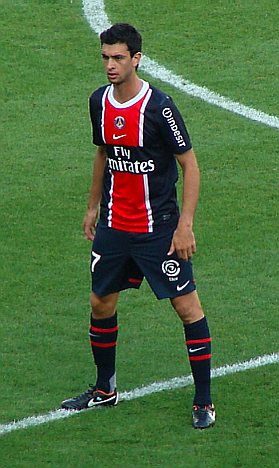
Pastore with PSG in August 2011

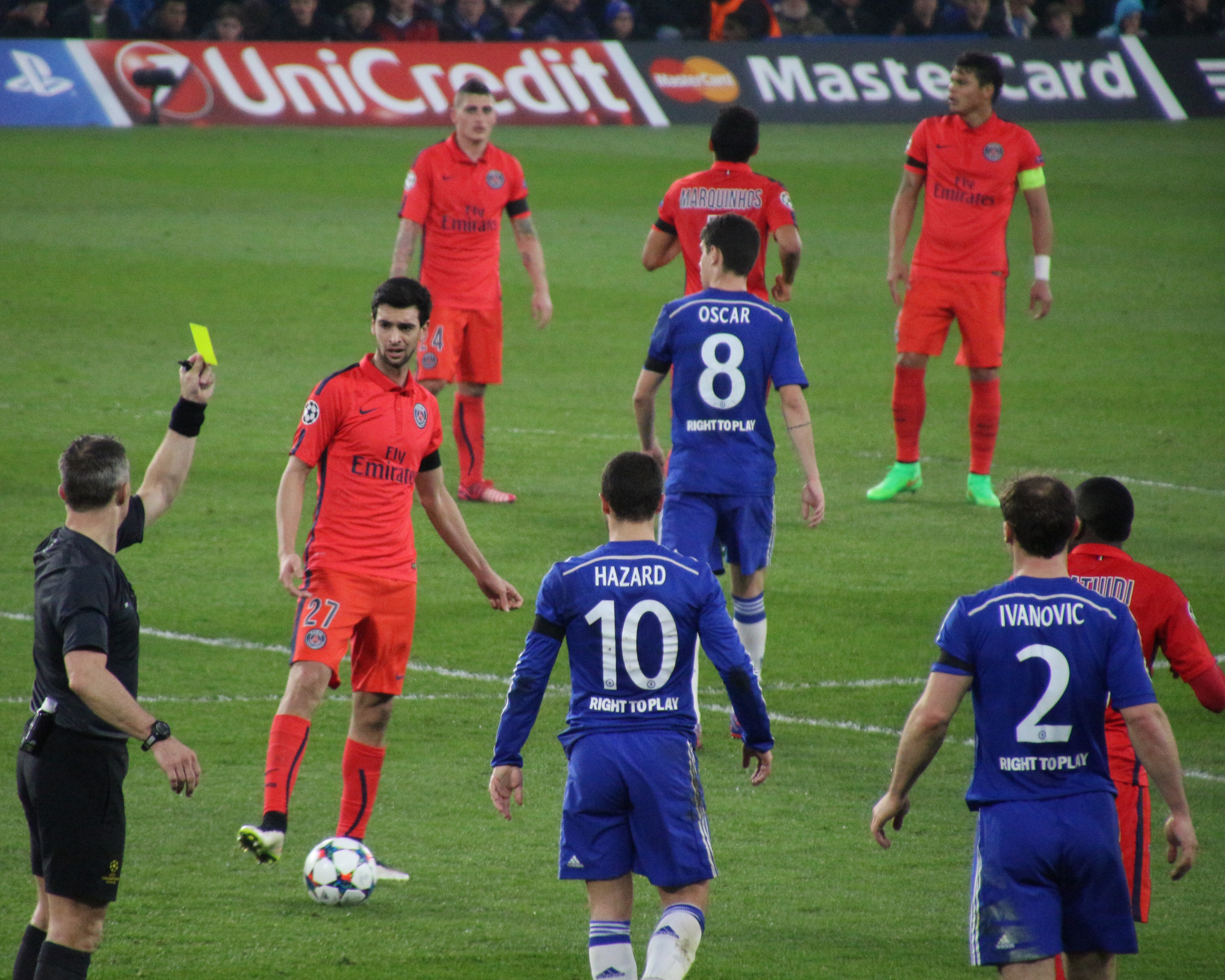
Pastore playing against Chelsea in UCL

On 6 August 2011, Paris Saint-Germain formally announced the signing of Pastore, issuing him the number 27 shirt. The transfer fee throughout was €39.8 million. However, due to third-party ownership by his agent Marcelo Simonian, who would receive €12.5 million (not known if it included agent fee or not) Palermo announced through its website that the club received only €22.8 million of the total fee.

Palermo club president Maurizio Zamparini started a legal action over the matter, despite the Italian Football Federation (FIGC) prohibiting any Italian club from forming any ownership agreement with third parties, which Zamparini acknowledged risked a punishment for himself.

Pastore scored his first goal in a Ligue 1 match against Brest in a 1–0 win on 11 September 2011.

During his first season at the Parc des Princes, Pastore scored 13 goals in 33 league matches. The following year, Pastore appeared in 34 league matches as PSG won the first of four consecutive Ligue 1 titles. He also scored his first UEFA Champions League goal in a 4–1 win over Dynamo Kyiv on 18 September 2012.

In 2014–15, Pastore made over 50 appearances and was named in the UNFP team of the season as PSG won an unprecedented domestic quadruple of Ligue 1, the Coupe de France, the Coupe de la Ligue and the Trophée des Champions.

Ahead of the 2016–17 season, Pastore inherited the number 10 shirt from the departing Zlatan Ibrahimović, switching from the number 27 shirt. As with 2015–16, he missed a large portion of the season through injuries, but returned to the PSG starting line-up for Le Classique against rivals Marseille, where he assisted Edinson Cavani in a 5–1 Ligue 1 away win on 26 February 2017. Three days later, he came on as a substitute and scored the opening goal, before assisting Cavani again as PSG defeated Ligue 2 club Niort 2–0 to reach the quarter-final stage of the 2016–17 Coupe de France. On 19 March 2017, Pastore assisted both of PSG's goals by crossing the ball to the scorers Adrien Rabiot and Julian Draxler in their 2–1 Ligue 1 home win over Lyon.

On 17 May 2017, Pastore appeared as a 72nd-minute substitute for Julian Draxler as PSG defeated Angers 1–0 in the 2017 Coupe de France Final.

Before the start of the next season, he vacated his number 10 jersey to new signing Neymar as a welcome gift and reclaimed his previous number 27 jersey.

On 8 May 2018, he came off the bench as PSG won 2–0 against Les Herbiers to clinch the 2017–18 Coupe de France.

=== Roma ===
On 26 June 2018, Pastore signed a five-year contract with Italian side Roma from Paris Saint-Germain for a reported fee of €24.7m. He was handed the number 27 shirt. He made his club debut in a 1–0 away win over Torino in Serie A on 19 August. He scored his first goal for the club on 27 August, opening the scoring with a back-heeled goal in the second minute of play in an eventual 3–3 home draw against Atalanta in the league.

On 30 August 2021, he mutually terminated his contract with Roma.

=== Elche ===
On 4 September 2021, Pastore signed for La Liga club Elche on a one-year contract.

In January 2023, Pastore announced that his Elche contract had been terminated by mutual consent and he was leaving the club.

=== Qatar SC ===
On 11 January 2023, Qatar Stars League club Qatar SC announced the signing of free agent Pastore.

On 2 November 2024, Pastore announced that he would retire from professional football before June 2025.

On 10 September 2025, in an interview with the media, Pastore said he had retired, and he is preparing to be a sporting director.

== International career ==
On 25 May 2010, Pastore was included by Maradona in Argentina's 23-man squad for the 2010 FIFA World Cup. He debuted on 22 June by coming on the pitch in the 77th minute against Greece, replacing Sergio Agüero, ending in a 2–0 victory. Against Mexico on 27 June, Pastore replaced Maxi Rodríguez in the 87th minute. Pastore was included by manager Sergio Batista in Argentina's 23-man squad for the 2011 Copa América on home soil. Argentina were eliminated by eventual champions Uruguay on penalties in the quarter-finals.

On 31 March 2015, Pastore scored his first senior international goal in a 2–1 friendly victory against Ecuador at the MetLife Stadium, New Jersey. Later that year, Pastore was selected by coach Gerardo Martino for the 2015 Copa América, and started in the team's opening fixture against Paraguay in La Serena. At the semi-final stage, Pastore scored the team's second goal and assisted Ángel Di María for the third as Argentina defeated Paraguay 6–1 to reach the tournament final. In the final against hosts Chile on 4 July, Pastore came off for Éver Banega in the 81st minute; following a 0–0 draw after extra-time, Chile claimed the title with a 4–1 penalty shoot-out victory.

In 2016, Pastore was included in Argentina's 23-man squad for the Copa América Centenario. Argentina went on to reach the final, only to lose out on penalties to Chile once again.

== Style of play ==
An elegant, creative and technically gifted advanced playmaker, with excellent dribbling skills and close control, Pastore is capable of playing in several offensive roles, due to his ability to both score and create goals. Although he is usually deployed as an attacking midfielder due to his vision, passing and striking ability from distance, he is also capable of functioning as a winger, as a supporting striker or even as a forward, and has also been deployed in more withdrawn midfield roles on occasion, operating as a central midfielder, as a deep-lying playmaker, or even as a mezzala, due to his work-rate, creativity, skill, and physical attributes, despite his lack of notable pace. Pastore is particularly renowned for his proficiency in executing the caño to bypass defenders in tight spaces. Described by The Athletic as a master of the skill, he frequently utilizes various techniques, including the inside, outside, sole, and heel of his foot, to nutmeg opponents. Pastore himself has characterized the skill not only as an effective tactical tool to breach compact defences, but also as an essential aesthetic component of football. A talented, strong, quick and hard-working right-footed player, his playing style has drawn comparisons to Kaká, Zinedine Zidane, Zlatan Ibrahimović and one of his childhood idols, Enzo Francescoli, although Pastore has stated that his main influence is compatriot Juan Román Riquelme. Nicknamed "El Flaco" (like Francescoli before him) due to his tall, slender build, he was regarded as a highly promising player as a youngster; in 2010, Don Balón named him as one of the 100 best young players in the world born after 1988. Despite his talent, however, he is known to be injury prone, and has also drawn criticism in the media for being inconsistent. In 2015, former Manchester United forward Eric Cantona described him as the "best player in the world" and "the most creative player at the moment", highlighting his unpredictable nature on the pitch.

== Career statistics ==
=== Club ===
As of match played 9 May 2023

Appearances and goals by club, season and competition
| Club | Season | League | | | Cup (Note: Includes Coppa Italia, Coupe de France, Coupe de la Ligue and Trophée des Champions) | | Continental (Note: Includes Copa Libertadores, Copa Sudamericana, UEFA Champions League, UEFA Europa League and UEFA Super Cup) | | Total | |
| Club | Season | Division | Apps | Goals | Apps | Goals | Apps | Goals | Apps | Goals |
|---|---|---|---|---|---|---|---|---|---|---|
| Talleres | 2006–07 | Primera B Nacional | 5 | 0 | 0 | 0 | — | | 5 | 0 |
| Huracán | 2007–08 | Argentine Primera División | 1 | 0 | 0 | 0 | — | | 1 | 0 |
| Huracán | 2008–09 | Argentine Primera División | 30 | 8 | 0 | 0 | — | | 30 | 8 |
| Huracán | Total | | 31 | 8 | 0 | 0 | — | | 31 | 8 |
| Palermo | 2009–10 | Serie A | 34 | 3 | 3 | 0 | — | | 37 | 3 |
| Palermo | 2010–11 | Serie A | 35 | 11 | 4 | 1 | 6 | 1 | 45 | 13 |
| Palermo | Total | | 69 | 14 | 7 | 1 | 6 | 1 | 82 | 16 |
| Paris Saint-Germain | 2011–12 | Ligue 1 | 33 | 13 | 3 | 1 | 7 | 2 | 43 | 16 |
| Paris Saint-Germain | 2012–13 | Ligue 1 | 34 | 4 | 4 | 2 | 10 | 3 | 48 | 9 |
| Paris Saint-Germain | 2013–14 | Ligue 1 | 29 | 1 | 6 | 1 | 6 | 1 | 41 | 3 |
| Paris Saint-Germain | 2014–15 | Ligue 1 | 34 | 5 | 7 | 1 | 10 | 0 | 51 | 6 |
| Paris Saint-Germain | 2015–16 | Ligue 1 | 16 | 2 | 4 | 1 | 6 | 0 | 26 | 3 |
| Paris Saint-Germain | 2016–17 | Ligue 1 | 15 | 0 | 6 | 3 | 2 | 0 | 23 | 3 |
| Paris Saint-Germain | 2017–18 | Ligue 1 | 25 | 4 | 9 | 1 | 3 | 0 | 37 | 5 |
| Paris Saint-Germain | Total | | 186 | 29 | 39 | 10 | 44 | 6 | 269 | 45 |
| Roma | 2018–19 | Serie A | 14 | 3 | 2 | 1 | 1 | 0 | 17 | 4 |
| Roma | 2019–20 | Serie A | 11 | 0 | 0 | 0 | 4 | 0 | 15 | 0 |
| Roma | 2020–21 | Serie A | 5 | 0 | 0 | 0 | 0 | 0 | 5 | 0 |
| Roma | Total | | 30 | 3 | 2 | 1 | 5 | 0 | 37 | 4 |
| Elche | 2021–22 | La Liga | 13 | 0 | 2 | 0 | — | | 15 | 0 |
| Elche | 2022–23 | La Liga | 1 | 0 | 0 | 0 | — | | 1 | 0 |
| Elche | Total | | 14 | 0 | 2 | 0 | — | | 16 | 0 |
| Qatar SC | 2022–23 | Qatar Stars League | 7 | 1 | 0 | 0 | — | | 7 | 1 |
| Career total | | | 342 | 55 | 50 | 12 | 55 | 7 | 447 | 74 |

=== International ===
Appearances and goals by national team and year
| National team | Year | Apps | Goals |
|---|---|---|---|
| Argentina | 2010 | 4 | 0 |
| Argentina | 2011 | 7 | 0 |
| Argentina | 2012 | 0 | 0 |
| Argentina | 2013 | 0 | 0 |
| Argentina | 2014 | 5 | 0 |
| Argentina | 2015 | 11 | 2 |
| Argentina | 2016 | 0 | 0 |
| Argentina | 2017 | 2 | 0 |
| Total | | 29 | 2 |

Scores and results list Argentina's goal tally first, score column indicates score after each Pastore goal.

List of international goals scored by Javier Pastore
| No. | Date | Venue | Opponent | Score | Result | Competition |
|---|---|---|---|---|---|---|
| 1 | 31 March 2015 | MetLife Stadium, East Rutherford, United States | Ecuador | 2–1 | 2–1 | Friendly |
| 2 | 30 June 2015 | Estadio Municipal de Concepción, Concepción, Chile | Paraguay | 2–0 | 6–1 | 2015 Copa América |

== Honours ==
Paris Saint-Germain

- Ligue 1: 2012–13, 2013–14, 2014–15, 2015–16, 2017–18
- Coupe de France: 2016–17, 2017–18
- Coupe de la Ligue: 2013–14, 2014–15, 2015–16, 2016–17, 2017–18
- Trophée des Champions: 2013, 2014, 2016, 2017

Argentina

- Copa América runner-up: 2015, 2016

Individual

- Serie A Young Footballer of the Year: 2010
- UNFP Ligue 1 Player of the Month: September 2011, November 2014, March 2015, April 2015
- UNFP Ligue 1 Team of the Year: 2014–15
