= 2015–16 Paris Saint-Germain FC season =

46th season in existence of Paris Saint-Germain

Paris Saint-Germain
2015–16 season
- President: Nasser Al-Khelaifi
- Head coach: Laurent Blanc
- Stadium: Parc des Princes
- Ligue 1: 1st
- Coupe de France: Winners
- Coupe de la Ligue: Winners
- Trophée des Champions: Winners
- UEFA Champions League: Quarter-finals
- Top goalscorer: League: Zlatan Ibrahimović (38); All: Zlatan Ibrahimović (50)
- Highest home attendance: 47,844 vs Nantes, 14 May 2016
- Lowest home attendance: 35,000 vs Toulouse, 19 January 2016
Home colours	Away colours	Third colours

The 2015–16 season was Paris Saint-Germain Football Club's 43rd professional season since its creation in 1970, and its 42nd consecutive season in the top-flight of French football.

== Players ==
French teams are limited to four players without EU citizenship. Hence, the squad list includes only the principal nationality of each player; several non-European players on the squad have dual citizenship with an EU country. Also, players from the ACP countries—countries in Africa, the Caribbean, and the Pacific that are signatories to the Cotonou Agreement—are not counted against non-EU quotas due to the Kolpak ruling.

=== Current squad ===
As of 17 February 2016.

Note: Flags indicate national team as defined under FIFA eligibility rules; some limited exceptions apply. Players may hold more than one non-FIFA nationality.

No.	Pos.	Nation	Player
1	GK	FRA	Nicolas Douchez
2	DF	BRA	Thiago Silva (captain)
3	DF	FRA	Presnel Kimpembe
4	MF	FRA	Benjamin Stambouli
5	DF	BRA	Marquinhos
6	MF	ITA	Marco Verratti
7	MF	BRA	Lucas Moura
8	MF	ITA	Thiago Motta
9	FW	URU	Edinson Cavani
10	FW	SWE	Zlatan Ibrahimović
11	MF	ARG	Ángel Di María
14	MF	FRA	Blaise Matuidi

No.	Pos.	Nation	Player
16	GK	GER	Kevin Trapp
17	DF	BRA	Maxwell
19	DF	CIV	Serge Aurier
20	DF	FRA	Layvin Kurzawa
23	DF	NED	Gregory van der Wiel
25	MF	FRA	Adrien Rabiot
27	MF	ARG	Javier Pastore
29	FW	FRA	Jean-Kévin Augustin
30	GK	ITA	Salvatore Sirigu
32	DF	BRA	David Luiz
35	FW	COD	Hervin Ongenda
36	MF	FRA	Timothée Taufflieb

=== Out on loan ===
Note: Flags indicate national team as defined under FIFA eligibility rules; some limited exceptions apply. Players may hold more than one non-FIFA nationality.

No.	Pos.	Nation	Player
—	GK	FRA	Alphonse Areola (at Villarreal)
—	DF	FRA	Lucas Digne (at Roma)
—	DF	FRA	Jordan Ikoko (at Lens)
—	DF	FRA	Youssouf Sabaly (at Nantes)

No.	Pos.	Nation	Player
—	MF	FRA	Romain Habran (at Stade Lavallois)
—	MF	BRA	Gustavo Hebling (at PEC Zwolle)
—	FW	FRA	Jean-Christophe Bahebeck (at Saint-Étienne)

== Transfers ==
=== In ===
No.	Pos	Player	Transferred from	Fee	Date
16	GK	(Germany) Kevin Trapp	(Germany) Eintracht Frankfurt	€9,000,000	10 July 2015
4	MF	(France) Benjamin Stambouli	(England) Tottenham Hotspur	€8,000,000	21 July 2015
11	MF	(Argentina) Ángel Di María	(England) Manchester United	€63,000,000	7 August 2015
20	DF	(France) Layvin Kurzawa	(France) Monaco	€25,000,000	28 August 2015
	MF	(Brazil) Gustavo Hebling	(Brazil) São Paulo	Free	1 September 2015

=== Out ===
Date	Pos.	Player	Age	Moving to	Fee
1 July 2015	GK	(France) Alphonse Areola	22	(Spain) Villarreal	Loan
1 July 2015	DF	(France) Zoumana Camara	36	Retired	N/A
10 July 2015	GK	(France) Mory Diaw	22	(Portugal) Mafra	N/A
10 July 2015	MF	(France) Yohan Cabaye	29	(England) Crystal Palace	€14,000,000
22 July 2015	MF	(France) Romain Habran	21	(France) Stade Lavallois	Loan
24 July 2015	DF	(France) Jordan Ikoko	21	(France) Lens	Loan
11 August 2015	FW	(France) Jean-Christophe Bahebeck	22	(France) Saint-Étienne	Loan
19 August 2015	GK	(France) Mike Maignan	20	(France) Lille	€1,000,000
27 August 2015	DF	(France) Lucas Digne	22	(Italy) Roma	Loan
1 September 2015	MF	(Brazil) Gustavo Hebling	19	(Netherlands) PEC Zwolle	Loan
1 September 2015	DF	(France) Youssouf Sabaly	22	(France) Nantes	Loan
25 January 2016	FW	(France) Roli Pereira de Sa	19	(France) Paris FC	Loan
17 February 2016	FW	(Argentina) Ezequiel Lavezzi	30	Hebei China Fortune	€4,000,000

== Pre-season and friendlies ==
12 July 2015 Friendly	Wiener	0–3	Paris Saint-Germain	Vienna, Austria
16:00 BST		PSG Report	Augustin 31', 44'; Aurier 49'	Stadium: Sportclub-Platz

19 July 2015 Int'l Champions Cup 1	Benfica	2–3	Paris Saint-Germain	Toronto, Ontario, Canada
01:35 BST	Talisca 34'; Jonas 42'; López (yellow card) 89'	PSG Report	Kimpembe (yellow card) 23'; Augustin 29'; Moura (yellow card) 60', (goal) 64'; Digne 79'	Stadium: BMO Field; Attendance: 17 843; Referee: Drew Fisher (Canada)

22 July 2015 Int'l Champions Cup 2	Paris Saint-Germain	4–2	Fiorentina	Harrison, New Jersey, United States
01:35 BST	Matuidi 35'; Augustin 41', 75'; Ibrahimović 69'	PSG Report	Vecino (yellow card) 53'; Joaquin 60'; Rossi 78'; Fazzi (yellow card) 80'	Stadium: Red Bull Arena

24 July 2015 Int'l Champions Cup 3	Paris Saint-Germain	1–1	Chelsea	Charlotte, North Carolina, United States
23:05 BST	Ibrahimović 25'; Rabiot (yellow card) 51'; Aurier (yellow card) 59'	PSG Report	Azpilicueta (yellow card) 34'; Moses 65'	Stadium: Bank of America Stadium; Referee: Ted Unkel (United States)

30 July 2015 Int'l Champions Cup 4	Manchester United	0–2	Paris Saint-Germain	Chicago, Illinois, United States
02:05 BST		PSG Report	Matuidi 25'; Ibrahimović 34'	Stadium: Soldier Field; Attendance: 61,351; Referee: Alan Kelly (Republic of Ireland)

== Competitions ==
=== Overall ===
Competition	Started round	Final position / round	First match	Last match
Ligue 1	Matchday 1	Winners	7 August 2015	14 May 2016
Coupe de France	Round of 64	Winners	3 January 2016	21 May 2016
Coupe de la Ligue	Round of 16	Winners	16 December 2015	23 April 2016
Trophée des Champions	Final	Winners	1 August 2015	
UEFA Champions League	Group stage	Quarter-finals	15 September 2015	12 April 2016

Updated to match played 21 May 2016.
Source: Competitions

=== Trophée des Champions ===
1 August 2015 Final	Paris Saint-Germain	2–0	Lyon	Montreal, Quebec, Canada
21:00 CEST (UTC+01:00)	Aurier 11'; Cavani 17'; Verratti (yellow card) 60'; David Luiz (yellow card) 81'	Report	Gonalons (yellow card) 37' (yellow-red card) 64'	Stadium: Stade Saputo; Attendance: 20,057; Referee: Mathieu Bourdeau

=== Ligue 1 ===
==== League table ====
Pos	Team	Pld	W	D	L	GF	GA	GD	Pts	Qualification or relegation
1	Paris Saint-Germain (C)	38	30	6	2	102	19	+83	96	Qualification for the Champions League group stage
2	Lyon	38	19	8	11	67	43	+24	65	Qualification for the Champions League group stage
3	Monaco	38	17	14	7	57	50	+7	65	Qualification for the Champions League third qualifying round
4	Nice	38	18	9	11	58	41	+17	63	Qualification for the Europa League group stage (Note: Since the winners of the 2015–16 Coupe de France and the 2015–16 Coupe de la Ligue, Paris Saint-Germain, qualified for European competition based on their league position, the spot awarded to the Coupe de France winners (Europa League group stage) was passed to the fourth-placed team and the spot awarded to the Coupe de la Ligue winners (Europa League third qualifying round) was passed to the sixth-placed team. The fifth-placed team received the spot in Europa League third qualifying round originally designated to the fourth-placed team.)
5	Lille	38	15	15	8	39	27	+12	60	Qualification for the Europa League third qualifying round

Source: Ligue 1, Soccerway
Rules for classification: 1) Points; 2) Goal difference; 3) Goals scored; 4) Head-to-head points; 5) Head-to-head goal difference; 6) Fairplay ranking.
(C) Champions

==== Results summary ====
Overall								Home						Away					
Pld	W	D	L	GF	GA	GD	Pts	W	D	L	GF	GA	GD	W	D	L	GF	GA	GD
38	30	6	2	102	19	+83	96	15	3	1	59	12	+47	15	3	1	43	7	+36

Last updated: 11 May 2016.
Source: Competitive matches

==== Results by round ====
Round	1	2	3	4	5	6	7	8	9	10	11	12	13	14	15	16	17	18	19	20	21	22	23	24	25	26	27	28	29	30	31	32	33	34	35	36	37	38
Ground	A	H	A	A	H	A	H	A	H	A	H	A	H	A	H	A	H	A	H	A	H	A	H	H	A	H	A	H	H	A	H	A	H	A	H			
Result	W	W	W	W	D	D	W	W	W	W	W	W	W	W	W	D	W	W	W	W	W	W	W	W	W	D	W	L	D	W	L	W	W	W	W	W	D	W
Position	8	1	1	1	1	1	1	1	1	1	1	1	1	1	1	1	1	1	1	1	1	1	1	1	1	1	1	1	1	1	1	1	1	1	1	1	1	1

Source: Competitive matches
A = Away; H = Home; W = Win; D = Draw; L = Loss

==== Matches ====
Win Draw Loss

7 August 2015 1	Lille	0–1	Paris Saint-Germain	Lille
20:30 CEST (UTC+01:00)	Sidibé (yellow card) 49'; Boufal (yellow card) 83'; Pavard (yellow card) 87'	Report	Rabiot (yellow card) 23' (yellow-red card) 28'; Motta (yellow card) 55'; Lucas 57'; Aurier (yellow card) 60'	Stadium: Stade Pierre-Mauroy; Attendance: 39,601; Referee: Fredy Fautrel

16 August 2015 2	Paris Saint-Germain	2–0	Gazélec Ajaccio	Paris
21:00 CEST (UTC+02:00)	Matuidi 11'; Thiago Silva 21'; Aurier (yellow card) 74'	Report	Lemoigne (yellow card) 54'; Zoua (yellow card) 62'; Filippi (yellow card) 84'	Stadium: Parc des Princes; Attendance: 46,524; Referee: Wilfried Bien

21 August 2015 3	Montpellier	0–1	Paris Saint-Germain	Montpellier
20:30 CEST (UTC+02:00)	Bensebaini (yellow card) 45+1'; Boudebouz (yellow card) 55'	Report	Matuidi (yellow card) 49', (goal) 61'; Motta (yellow card) 74'	Stadium: Stade de la Mosson; Attendance: 27,163; Referee: Sébastien Moreira

30 August 2015 4	Monaco	0–3	Paris Saint-Germain	Monaco
21:00 CEST (UTC+02:00)		Report	Cavani 57', 73'; David Luiz (yellow card) 70'; Lavezzi 83'	Stadium: Stade Louis II; Attendance: 16,224; Referee: Benoît Bastien

11 September 2015 5	Paris Saint-Germain	2–2	Bordeaux	Paris
20:30 CEST (UTC+02:00)	Cavani 27', 34', (yellow card) 90+4'; Aurier (yellow card) 56'	Report	Trapp 31' (o.g.); Saivet (yellow card) 32' (yellow-red card) 77'; Biyogo Poko (yellow card) 71'; Khazri 79'; Maurice-Belay (yellow card) 90+4'	Stadium: Parc de Princes; Attendance: 46,860; Referee: Antony Gautier

19 September 2015 6	Reims	1–1	Paris Saint-Germain	Reims
17:30 CEST (UTC+02:00)	Siebatcheu 83'; Kankava (yellow card) 4'; Kyei (yellow card) 74'	Report	Cavani 84'; Stambouli (yellow card) 67'; Matuidi (yellow card) 80'	Stadium: Stade Auguste Delaune; Attendance: 20,526; Referee: Bartolomeu Varela

22 September 2015 7	Paris Saint-Germain	3–0	Guingamp	Paris
21:00 CEST (UTC+02:00)	Pastore 18'; Di María 77'; Ibrahimović 83'; Matuidi (yellow card) 59'	Report	Sankharé (yellow card) 86'	Stadium: Parc des Princes; Attendance: 45,138; Referee: Frank Schneider

26 September 2015 8	Nantes	1–4	Paris Saint-Germain	Nantes
17:30 CEST (UTC+02:00)	Bammou 11'; Lenjani (yellow card) 40'; Vizcarrondo (yellow card) 69'	Report	Ibrahimović 48', (yellow card) 67'; Cavani 73'; Di María 80'; Aurier 90'	Stadium: Stade de la Beaujoire; Attendance: 31,410; Referee: Amaury Delerue

4 October 2015 9	Paris Saint-Germain	2–1	Marseille	Paris
21:00 CEST (UTC+02:00)	Ibrahimović 41' (pen.), 44' (pen.); Aurier (yellow card) 55'; Verratti (yellow card) 88'	Report	Batshuayi 30'; Barrada (yellow card) 35'; Mandanda (yellow card) 40'; Diarra (yellow card) 61'	Stadium: Parc des Princes; Attendance: 47,199; Referee: Benoît Bastien

17 October 2015 10	Bastia	0–2	Paris Saint-Germain	Furiani
17:00 CEST (UTC+02:00)	Danic (yellow card) 29'; Ngando (yellow card) 38'; Cahuzac (yellow card) 47'	Report	Marquinhos (yellow card) 44'; Ibrahimović 72', 83'	Stadium: Stade Armand-Cesari; Attendance: 13,066; Referee: Lionel Jaffredo

25 October 2015 11	Paris Saint-Germain	4–1	Saint-Étienne	Paris
21:00 CEST (UTC+01:00)	Kurzawa 23'; Cavani 48'; Ibrahimović 67'; Lucas 87'	Report	Verratti 73' (o.g.)	Stadium: Parc des Princes; Attendance: 47,385; Referee: Clément Turpin

30 October 2015 12	Rennes	0–1	Paris Saint-Germain	Rennes
20:30 CEST (UTC+01:00)		Report	Di María 75'	Stadium: Roazhon Park; Referee: Fredy Fautrel

7 November 2015 13	Paris Saint-Germain	5–0	Toulouse	Paris
16:00 CEST (UTC+01:00)	Di María 6'; Ibrahimović 18', 75'; Lucas 66'; Lavezzi 78'; David Luiz (yellow card) 88'; Stambouli (yellow card) 90'	Report	Tisserand (yellow card) 34'	Stadium: Parc des Princes; Attendance: 47,381; Referee: Johan Hamel

21 November 2015 14	Lorient	1–2	Paris Saint-Germain	Lorient
17:00 CEST (UTC+01:00)	Ndong (yellow card) 28'; Gassama (yellow card) 38'; Moukandjo 82'	Report	Ongenda 26'; Matuidi 32'; Rabiot (yellow card) 78'	Stadium: Stade du Moustoir; Attendance: 15,417; Referee: Stéphane Lannoy

28 November 2015 15	Paris Saint-Germain	4–1	Troyes	Paris
17:00 CEST (UTC+01:00)	Cavani 20'; Ibrahimović 58' (pen.); Kurzawa 67'; Augustin 84'	Report	Mavinga (yellow card) 29'; Ayasse 90'	Stadium: Parc des Princes; Attendance: 45,932; Referee: Bartolomeu Varela

1 December 2015 16	Angers	0–0	Paris Saint-Germain	Angers
19:00 CET (UTC+01:00)		Report	Aurier (yellow card) 23'	Stadium: Stade Jean-Bouin; Attendance: 16,381; Referee: Benoît Bastien

4 December 2015 17	Nice	0–3	Paris Saint-Germain	Nice
20:30 CET (UTC+01:00)	Hult (red card) 43'	Report	Cavani 35'; Matuidi (yellow card) 40'; Ibrahimović 44' (pen.), 61'; Aurier (yellow card) 85'	Stadium: Allianz Riviera; Attendance: 31,008; Referee: Antony Gautier

13 December 2015 18	Paris Saint-Germain	5–1	Lyon	Paris
21:00 CET (UTC+01:00)	Ibrahimović 11', 77' (pen.); Aurier 17'; David Luiz (yellow card) 25'; Motta (yellow card) 58'; Cavani 61'; Lucas 90+1'	Report	Cornet (yellow card) 22'; Ferri 24'	Stadium: Parc des Princes; Attendance: 46,650; Referee: Ruddy Buquet

19 December 2015 19	Caen	0–3	Paris Saint-Germain	Caen
17:00 CET (UTC+01:00)	Seube (yellow card) 42'; Da Silva (yellow card) 62'; Makengo (yellow card) 64'	Report	Di María 16', 50'; Ibrahimović 36'; Aurier (yellow card) 83'; Thiago Silva (yellow card) 83'	Stadium: Stade Michel d'Ornano; Attendance: 20,679; Referee: Lionel Jaffredo

8 January 2016 20	Paris Saint-Germain	2–0	Bastia	Paris
20:30 CET (UTC+01:00)	Motta 29'; Maxwell 39'; Verratti (yellow card) 45'	Report	Squillaci (yellow card) 54'; Marange (yellow card) 71'; Fofana (yellow card) 74'	Stadium: Parc des Princes; Attendance: 44,879; Referee: Sébastien Moreira

16 January 2016 21	Toulouse	0–1	Paris Saint-Germain	Toulouse
17:00 CET (UTC+01:00)	Akpa Akpro (yellow card) 72'	Report	Ibrahimović 73'	Stadium: Stadium Municipal; Attendance: 30,178; Referee: Bartolomeu Varela

23 January 2016 22	Paris Saint-Germain	5–1	Angers	Paris
17:00 CET (UTC+01:00)	Ibrahimović 33'; Lucas 40'; Van der Wiel 54'; Di María 63', 66'	Report	Saïss (yellow card) 39'; Capelle 59'	Stadium: Parc des Princes; Attendance: 46,199; Referee: Fredy Fautrel

31 January 2016 23	Saint-Étienne	0–2	Paris Saint-Germain	Saint-Étienne
21:00 CET (UTC+01:00)	Søderlund (yellow card) 14'; Lemoine (yellow card) 65'; Cohade (yellow card) 79'; Clément (yellow card) 84'	Report	Kimpembe (yellow card) 9'; Motta (yellow card) 36'; Ibrahimović 61', 90+1'	Stadium: Stade Geoffroy-Guichard; Attendance: 32,689; Referee: Lionel Jaffredo

3 February 2016 24	Paris Saint-Germain	3–1	Lorient	Paris
21:00 CET (UTC+01:00)	Cavani 6'; Augustin (yellow card) 37'; Ibrahimović 55'; Kurzawa 69'	Report	Guerreiro 19'; Abdullah (yellow card) 51'	Stadium: Stade de France; Attendance: 45,358; Referee: Hakim Bel El Hadj

7 February 2016 25	Marseille	1–2	Paris Saint-Germain	Marseille
21:00 CET (UTC+01:00)	Cabella 25'	Report	Ibrahimović 2'; Di María 71'; Motta (yellow card) 88'	Stadium: Stade Vélodrome; Attendance: 61,166; Referee: Ruddy Buquet

13 February 2016 26	Paris Saint-Germain	0–0	Lille	Paris
17:00 CET (UTC+01:00)	Pastore (yellow card) 28'; Lucas (yellow card) 68'	Report	Civelli (yellow card) 68'; Martin (yellow card) 76'; Enyeama (yellow card) 87'	Stadium: Parc des Princes; Attendance: 45,391; Referee: Frank Schneider

20 February 2016 27	Paris Saint-Germain	4–1	Reims	Paris
17:00 CET (UTC+01:00)	Van der Wiel 12', (yellow card) 33'; Ibrahimović 43', 68'; Cavani 45+1', (yellow card) 81'	Report	Oniangue 34'	Stadium: Parc des Princes; Attendance: 45,489; Referee: Jérôme Miguelgorry

28 February 2016 28	Lyon	2–1	Paris Saint-Germain	Lyon
21:00 CET (UTC+01:00)	Cornet 13'; Yanga-Mbiwa (yellow card) 43'; Darder 45+2'; Ferri (yellow card) 72'; Rafael (yellow card) 73'	Report	Motta (yellow card) 23'; Lucas 51', (yellow card) 89'; Van der Wiel (yellow card) 58'; Cavani (yellow card) 63'; Rabiot (yellow card) 74'	Stadium: Parc Olympique Lyonnais; Attendance: 56,661; Referee: Lionel Jaffredo

5 March 2016 29	Paris Saint-Germain	0–0	Montpellier	Paris
17:00 CET (UTC+01:00)		Report	Rémy (yellow card) 80'	Stadium: Parc des Princes; Attendance: 45,173; Referee: Tony Chapron

13 March 2016 30	Troyes	0–9	Paris Saint-Germain	Troyes
14:00 CET (UTC+1)	Thiago Xavier (yellow card) 73'; Karaboué (red card) 74'	Report	Cavani 13', 75'; Pastore 17'; Rabiot 19'; Ibrahimović 46', 52', 55', 88'; Saunier 58' (o.g.)	Stadium: Stade de l'Aube; Attendance: 19,184; Referee: François Letexier

20 March 2016 31	Paris Saint-Germain	0–2	Monaco	Paris
21:00 CET (UTC+01:00)	David Luiz (yellow card) 67'	Report	Jemerson (yellow card) 32'; Vágner Love 65'; Fabinho 68' (pen.)	Stadium: Parc des Princes; Attendance: 46,569; Referee: Antony Gautier

2 April 2016 32	Paris Saint-Germain	4–1	Nice	Paris
16:00 CEST (UTC+02:00)	Ibrahimović 15', 34', 82'; David Luiz 48'; Thiago Silva (yellow card) 68'	Report	Ben Arfa 18'	Stadium: Parc des Princes; Attendance: 46,919; Referee: Mikaël Lesage

9 April 2016 33	Guingamp	0–2	Paris Saint-Germain	Guingamp
17:00 CEST (UTC+02:00)	Kerbrat (yellow card) 27'; Briand (yellow card) 56'	Report	Lucas 56' (pen.), 72'	Stadium: Stade du Roudourou; Attendance: 18,363; Referee: Fredy Fautrel

16 April 2016 34	Paris Saint-Germain	6–0	Caen	Paris
17:00 CEST (UTC+02:00)	Ibrahimović 12', 56'; Matuidi 45'; Cavani 49'; Di María 52'; Maxwell 76'	Report		Stadium: Parc des Princes; Attendance: 44,807; Referee: Bartolomeu Varela

29 April 2016 36	Paris Saint-Germain	4–0	Rennes	Paris
20:30 CEST (UTC+02:00)	Maxwell 50'; Ibrahimović 54', 78'; Aurier (yellow card) 57'; Cavani 90+1'	Report	Gnagnon (yellow card) 34'	Stadium: Parc des Princes; Attendance: 45,341; Referee: Amaury Delerue

7 May 2016 37	Gazélec Ajaccio	0–4	Paris Saint-Germain	Ajaccio, Corsica
21:00 CEST (UTC+02:00)	Mangane (yellow card) 74'	Report	Cavani 13', 49', 58'; Thiago Silva (yellow card) 51'; Ibrahimović 90'	Stadium: Stade Ange Casanova; Attendance: 3,970; Referee: Mikaël Lesage

11 May 2016 35	Bordeaux	1–1	Paris Saint-Germain	Bordeaux
20:30 CEST (UTC+02:00)	Rolán (yellow card) 14'; Pallois 66'	Report	Kurzawa (yellow card) 41'; Lucas (yellow card) 47'; Ibrahimović 59'	Stadium: Stade Chaban-Delmas; Attendance: 38,026; Referee: François Letexier

14 May 2016 38	Paris Saint-Germain	4–0	Nantes	Paris
21:00 CEST (UTC+02:00)	Ibrahimović 18', 89'; Rabiot (yellow card) 38'; Lucas 43'; Marquinhos 52'	Report	Gillet (yellow card) 51'	Stadium: Parc des Princes; Attendance: 47,844; Referee: Lionel Jaffredo

=== Coupe de France ===
3 January 2016 Round of 64	Wasquehal	0–1	Paris Saint-Germain	Villeneuve-d'Ascq
14:15 CET (UTC+01:00)	Loore (yellow card) 82'	Report	Ibrahimović 60'	Stadium: Stadium Lille Métropole; Attendance: 10,000; Referee: Mikaël Lesage

19 January 2016 Round of 32	Paris Saint-Germain	2–1	Toulouse	Paris
21:00 CET (UTC+01:00)	David Luiz 54', (yellow card) 73'; Di María (yellow card) 59'; Ibrahimović 89' (pen.)	Report	Moubandje 11'; Ninkov (yellow card) 64'; Regattin (yellow card) 89'	Stadium: Parc des Princes; Attendance: 35,000; Referee: Tony Chapron

10 February 2016 Round of 16	Paris Saint-Germain	3–0	Lyon	Paris
21:05 CET (UTC+01:00)	Ibrahimović 63', 67'; Rabiot 75'; David Luiz (yellow card) 78'	Report	Umtiti (yellow card) 29'	Stadium: Parc des Princes; Attendance: 42,000; Referee: Clément Turpin

2 March 2016 Quarter-finals	Saint-Étienne	1–3	Paris Saint-Germain	Saint-Étienne
21:05 CET (UTC+01:00)	Malcuit (yellow card) 24'; Eysseric 43' (pen.)	Report	Cavani 12'; Marquinhos 12'; Stambouli (yellow card) 68'; Rabiot (yellow card) 77'; Lucas 90'	Stadium: Stade Geoffroy Guichard; Attendance: 36,716; Referee: Benoît Bastien

19 April 2016 Semi-finals	Lorient	0–1	Paris Saint-Germain	Lorient
21:00 CEST (UTC+02:00)	Ndong (yellow card) 56'; Mesloub (yellow card) 82'	Report	Matuidi (yellow card) 56'; Ibrahimović (yellow card) 64', (goal) 75'	Stadium: Stade du Moustoir; Attendance: 16,474; Referee: Frank Schneider

21 May 2016 Final	Marseille	2–4	Paris Saint-Germain	Saint-Denis
21:00 CEST (UTC+02:00)	Thauvin 12'; Mendy (yellow card) 33'; Batshuayi 87'	Report	Matuidi 3'; Ibrahimović 47' (pen.), 82'; Cavani 57'	Stadium: Stade de France; Attendance: 80,000; Referee: Clément Turpin

=== Coupe de la Ligue ===
16 December 2015 Round of 16	Paris Saint-Germain	1–0	Saint-Étienne	Paris
21:00 CET (UTC+01:00)	Stambouli (yellow card) 55'; Lucas (yellow card) 57'; Cavani 86'	Report	Pierre-Gabriel (yellow card) 41'	Stadium: Parc des Princes; Attendance: 47,346; Referee: Amaury Delerue

13 January 2016 Quarter-finals	Paris Saint-Germain	2–1	Lyon	Paris
21:00 CET (UTC+01:00)	Rabiot 17'; Lucas 73'	Report	Tolisso 42'	Stadium: Parc des Princes; Attendance: 47,267; Referee: Benoît Bastien

27 January 2016 Semi-finals	Paris Saint-Germain	2–0	Toulouse	Paris
21:05 CET (UTC+01:00)	Lavezzi 65'; Aurier (yellow card) 69'; Di María 72'; Kimpembe (yellow card) 89'	Report		Stadium: Parc des Princes; Attendance: 46,897; Referee: Amaury Delerue

23 April 2016 Final	Paris Saint-Germain	2–1	Lille	Saint-Denis
21:00 CEST (UTC+02:00)	Aurier (yellow card) 19'; Pastore 40'; Rabiot (yellow card) 48' (yellow-red card) 70'; Di María 74'	Report	Sidibé 49'; Amadou (yellow card) 70'	Stadium: Stade de France; Attendance: 68,640; Referee: Ruddy Buquet

=== UEFA Champions League ===
==== Group stage ====
Pos	Team	Pld	W	D	L	GF	GA	GD	Pts	Qualification	RMA	PAR	SHK	MAL
1	(Spain) Real Madrid	6	5	1	0	19	3	+16	16	Advance to knockout phase	—	1–0	4–0	8–0
2	(France) Paris Saint-Germain	6	4	1	1	12	1	+11	13	Advance to knockout phase	0–0	—	2–0	2–0
3	(Ukraine) Shakhtar Donetsk	6	1	0	5	7	14	−7	3	Transfer to Europa League	3–4	0–3	—	4–0
4	(Sweden) Malmö FF	6	1	0	5	1	21	−20	3		0–2	0–5	1–0	—

Source: UEFA
Rules for classification: Group stage tiebreakers

15 September 2015 1	Paris Saint-Germain (France)	2–0	(Sweden) Malmö FF	Paris, France
20:45 CEST (UTC+02:00)	Di María 4'; Cavani 61'; Verratti (yellow card) 65'; David Luiz (yellow card) 71'	Report	Adu (yellow card) 57'; Bengtsson (yellow card) 64'	Stadium: Parc des Princes; Attendance: 46,612; Referee: Sergei Karasev (Russia)

30 September 2015 2	Shakhtar Donetsk (Ukraine)	0–3	(France) Paris Saint-Germain	Lviv, Ukraine
20:45 CEST (UTC+02:00)		Report	Aurier 7'; David Luiz 23', (yellow card) 86'; Ibrahimović (yellow card) 65'; Thiago Silva (yellow card) 89'; Srna 90' (o.g.)	Stadium: Arena Lviv; Attendance: 32,730; Referee: Deniz Aytekin (Germany)

21 October 2015 3	Paris Saint-Germain (France)	0–0	(Spain) Real Madrid	Paris, France
20:45 CEST (UTC+02:00)	Matuidi (yellow card) 9'; Verratti (yellow card) 50'; Aurier (yellow card) 87'	Report	Ramos (yellow card) 60'; Vázquez (yellow card) 77'; Cheryshev (yellow card) 85'	Stadium: Parc des Princes; Attendance: 46,858; Referee: Nicola Rizzoli (Italy)

3 November 2015 4	Real Madrid (Spain)	1–0	(France) Paris Saint-Germain	Madrid, Spain
20:45 CET (UTC+01:00)	Nacho 35'; Casemiro (yellow card) 88'; Navas (yellow card) 90+2'	Report	Aurier (yellow card) 45'; David Luiz (yellow card) 67'	Stadium: Santiago Bernabéu; Attendance: 78,300; Referee: Mark Clattenburg (England)

25 November 2015 5	Malmö FF (Sweden)	0–5	(France) Paris Saint-Germain	Malmö, Sweden
20:45 CET (UTC+01:00)	Rosenberg (yellow card) 42'; Bengtsson (yellow card) 90'	Report	Rabiot 3'; Di María 14', 68'; Ibrahimović 50'; Lucas 82'	Stadium: Swedbank Stadion; Attendance: 20,500; Referee: Willie Collum (Scotland)

8 December 2015 6	Paris Saint-Germain (France)	2–0	(Ukraine) Shakhtar Donetsk	Paris, France
20:45 CET (UTC+01:00)	Lavezzi (yellow card) 39'; Lucas 57'; Ibrahimović 86'	Report	Srna (yellow card) 62'; Ismaily (yellow card) 81'; Rakitskiy (yellow card) 84'	Stadium: Parc des Princes; Attendance: 44,408; Referee: Anthony Taylor (England)

==== Knockout phase ====
===== Round of 16 =====
17 February 2016 First leg	Paris Saint-Germain (France)	2–1	(England) Chelsea	Paris, France
20:45 CET (UTC+01:00)	Ibrahimović (yellow card) 19', (goal) 39'; Lucas (yellow card) 71'; David Luiz (yellow card) 71'; Cavani 78'	Report	Mikel (yellow card) 38', (goal) 45+1'; Pedro (yellow card) 67'	Stadium: Parc des Princes; Attendance: 46,505; Referee: Carlos Velasco Carballo (Spain)

10 March 2016 Second leg	Chelsea (England)	1–2 (2–4 agg.)	(France) Paris Saint-Germain	London, England
20:45 CET (UTC+01:00)	Costa 27'; Fàbregas (yellow card) 45'; Mikel (yellow card) 53'; Ivanović (yellow card) 90'	Report	Rabiot 16', (yellow card) 35'; Motta (yellow card) 41'; Ibrahimović 67'; Matuidi (yellow card) 86'	Stadium: Stamford Bridge; Attendance: 37,591; Referee: Felix Brych (Germany)

===== Quarter-finals =====
6 April 2016 First leg	Paris Saint-Germain (France)	2–2	(England) Manchester City	Paris, France
20:45 CEST (UTC+02:00)	David Luiz (yellow card) 1'; Ibrahimović (penalty missed) 14', 41'; Matuidi (yellow card) 48'; Rabiot 59'	Report	Clichy (yellow card) 11'; Fernando (yellow card) 36'; De Bruyne 38'; Fernandinho 72'; Mangala (yellow card) 83'; Navas (yellow card) 85'	Stadium: Parc des Princes; Attendance: 47,228; Referee: Milorad Mažić (Serbia)

12 April 2016 Second leg	Manchester City (England)	1–0 (3–2 agg.)	(France) Paris Saint-Germain	Manchester, England
20:45 CEST (UTC+02:00)	Agüero (penalty missed) 30'; Fernandinho (yellow card) 72'; De Bruyne 76'	Report	Trapp (yellow card) 29'; Pastore (yellow card) 67'; Van der Wiel (yellow card) 68'	Stadium: Etihad Stadium; Attendance: 53,039; Referee: Carlos Velasco Carballo (Spain)

== Statistics ==
=== Appearances and goals ===
No.	Pos	Nat	Player	Total		Ligue 1		Coupe de France		Coupe de la Ligue		Trophée des Champions		Champions League	
No.	Pos	Nat	Player	Apps	Goals	Apps	Goals	Apps	Goals	Apps	Goals	Apps	Goals	Apps	Goals
Goalkeepers
1	GK	(France) FRA	Nicolas Douchez	2	0	1	0	0	0	1	0	0	0	0	0
16	GK	(Germany) GER	Kevin Trapp	46	0	35	0	0	0	0	0	1	0	10	0
30	GK	(Italy) ITA	Salvatore Sirigu	12	0	2+1	0	6	0	3	0	0	0	0	0
Defenders
2	DF	(Brazil) BRA	Thiago Silva	46	1	29+1	1	4	0	2	0	1	0	9	0
3	DF	(France) FRA	Presnel Kimpembe	9	0	5+1	0	2	0	1	0	0	0	0	0
5	DF	(Brazil) BRA	Marquinhos	43	2	20+9	1	4+1	1	3	0	0	0	6	0
17	DF	(Brazil) BRA	Maxwell	42	3	24+4	3	3+1	0	0	0	1	0	9	0
19	DF	(Ivory Coast) CIV	Serge Aurier	33	4	21	2	4	0	2	0	1	1	5	1
20	DF	(France) FRA	Layvin Kurzawa	25	3	14+2	3	3+1	0	4	0	0	0	1	0
23	DF	(Netherlands) NED	Gregory van der Wiel	27	2	16+1	2	1+1	0	2	0	0	0	4+2	0
32	DF	(Brazil) BRA	David Luiz	40	3	23+2	1	2+2	1	2+1	0	1	0	7	1
34	DF	(France) FRA	Kévin Rimane	1	0	0+1	0	0	0	0	0	0	0	0	0
Midfielders
4	MF	(France) FRA	Benjamin Stambouli	39	0	18+9	0	5+1	0	3	0	0+1	0	1+1	0
6	MF	(Italy) ITA	Marco Verratti	28	0	11+7	0	1	0	2+1	0	1	0	5	0
7	MF	(Brazil) BRA	Lucas Moura	55	13	26+10	9	1+5	1	2+2	1	0	0	3+6	2
8	MF	(Italy) ITA	Thiago Motta	46	1	26+6	1	3	0	0+1	0	1	0	9	0
11	MF	(Argentina) ARG	Ángel Di María	47	15	26+3	10	3+1	0	2+2	2	0	0	9+1	3
14	MF	(France) FRA	Blaise Matuidi	48	5	23+8	4	4+1	1	1+1	0	1	0	9	0
25	MF	(France) FRA	Adrien Rabiot	42	6	19+5	1	6	1	4	1	1	0	5+2	3
27	MF	(Argentina) ARG	Javier Pastore	26	3	11+5	2	1+1	0	2	1	0	0	0+6	0
33	MF	(France) FRA	Christopher Nkunku	6	0	4+1	0	0	0	0	0	0	0	0+1	0
36	MF	(France) FRA	Timothée Taufflieb	1	0	0+1	0	0	0	0	0	0	0	0	0
45	MF	(Ivory Coast) CIV	Yakou Méïté	1	0	0+1	0	0	0	0	0	0	0	0	0
Forwards
9	FW	(Uruguay) URU	Edinson Cavani	52	25	24+8	19	5	2	2+2	1	1	1	7+3	2
10	FW	(Sweden) SWE	Zlatan Ibrahimović	51	50	29+2	38	5+1	7	2+1	0	1	0	10	5
29	FW	(France) FRA	Jean-Kévin Augustin	17	1	4+9	1	1	0	1	0	0+1	0	0+1	0
35	FW	(France) FRA	Hervin Ongenda	6	1	4+1	1	1	0	0	0	0	0	0	0
Players transferred out during the season
31	DF	(France) FRA	Youssouf Sabaly	0	0	0	0	0	0	0	0	0	0	0	0
15	FW	(France) FRA	Jean-Christophe Bahebeck	1	0	0	0	0	0	0	0	0+1	0	0	0
22	FW	(Argentina) ARG	Ezequiel Lavezzi	24	3	3+13	2	1	0	3	1	0	0	1+3	0
—	GK	(France) FRA	Mike Maignan	0	0	0	0	0	0	0	0	0	0	0	0
—	DF	(France) FRA	Lucas Digne	0	0	0	0	0	0	0	0	0	0	0	0
—	MF	(Brazil) BRA	Gustavo Hebling	0	0	0	0	0	0	0	0	0	0	0	0
—	FW	(France) FRA	Roli Pereira de Sa	0	0	0	0	0	0	0	0	0	0	0	0

Last updated: 21 May 2016
Source: Competitions
