= Benjamin Stambouli =

French footballer (born 1990)

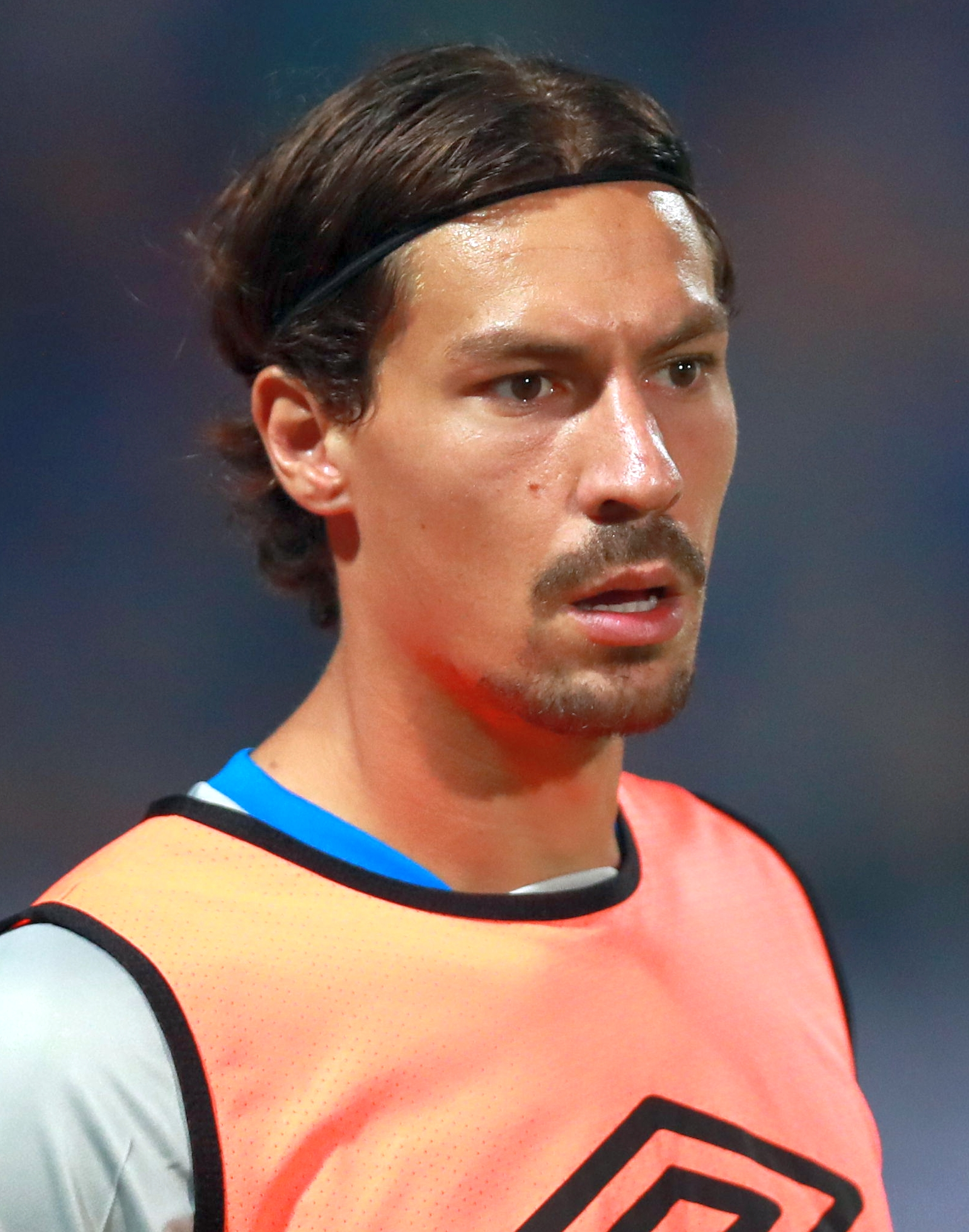
- Stambouli with Schalke 04 in 2018

Personal information
- Full name: Benjamin Fernand Lucien François Stambouli
- Date of birth: 13 August 1990 (age 36)
- Place of birth: Marseille, France
- Height: 1.80 m (5 ft 11 in)
- Positions: Defensive midfielder; centre-back

Youth career
- 1996–1997: Marseille
- 1997–2001: Gallia Uzes
- 2001–2003: Sedan
- 2003–2004: Gallia Uzes
- 2004–2010: Montpellier

Senior career*
Years	Team	Apps	(Gls)
2010–2014	Montpellier	112	(3)
2014–2015	Tottenham Hotspur	12	(0)
2015–2016	Paris Saint-Germain	27	(0)
2016–2021	Schalke 04	105	(0)
2021–2024	Adana Demirspor	82	(4)
2024	Reims	7	(0)
2024–2026	Metz	45	(1)

International career
2010–2012	France U21	12	(0)
- * Club domestic league appearances and goals as of 20 May 2026

Benjamin Fernand Lucien François Stambouli (born 13 August 1990) is a French former professional footballer who played as a defensive midfielder or centre-back.

Stambouli began his professional career with Montpellier, playing 130 games from 2010 to 2014 and winning Ligue 1 in 2012. After a season each with Tottenham Hotspur and Paris Saint-Germain – winning five domestic trophies with the latter – he signed for Schalke in 2016. Stambouli made twelve appearances for France at under-21 level from 2010 to 2012.

== Early life ==
Benjamin Fernand Lucien François Stambouli was born on 13 August 1990 in Marseille, Bouches-du-Rhône. His father was Henri Stambouli, a former football player and former head coach of French club Marseille. One of his grandfathers is former manager Gérard Banide, and his uncle is manager Laurent Banide.

== Club career ==
=== Montpellier ===
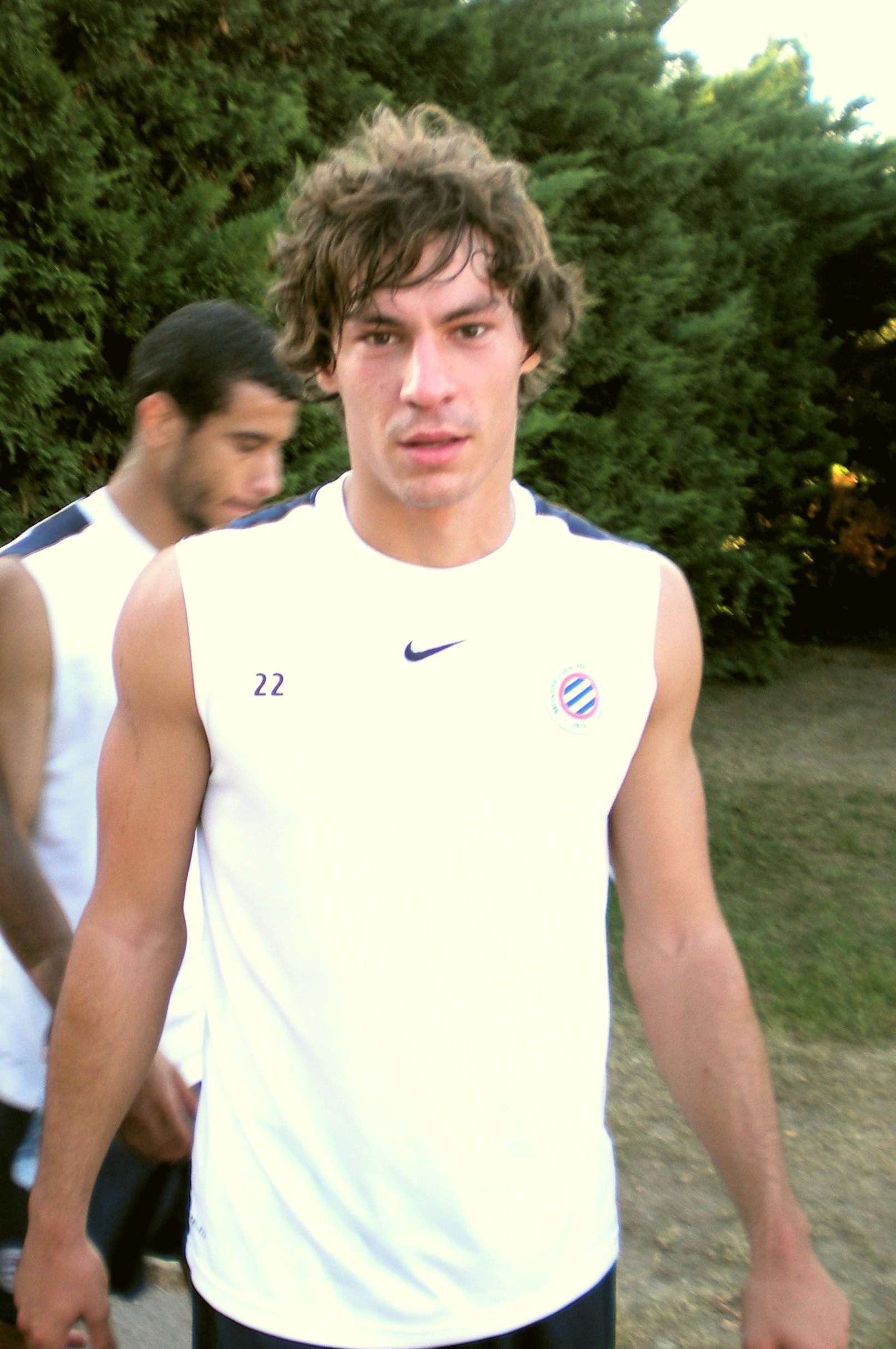
Stambouli with Montpellier in 2012

Stambouli spent eight months as a child at Marseille, and also had two years at Sedan before joining the ranks of Montpellier in July 2004. On 3 March 2010, he signed his first professional contract, a three-year deal with Montpellier.

Stambouli made his professional debut on 8 August 2010 on the first day of the 2010–11 Ligue 1 season, playing the full 90 minutes of a 1–0 home win over Bordeaux. During the 2011–12 season, he played 26 league games as Montpellier won the Ligue 1 title for the first time in the club's history. During the 2013–14 season, Stambouli played 37 out of Montpellier's 38 league games and was promoted to position of vice-captain behind Brazilian Vitorino Hilton.

=== Tottenham Hotspur ===
On 1 September 2014, Stambouli signed for Premier League team Tottenham Hotspur for an undisclosed fee, rumoured to be in the region of £4.7 million. He scored his only goal for the club in a UEFA Europa League match against Partizan on 27 November, following up a shot from Roberto Soldado, which had rebounded off of the post. Stambouli appeared in every round of the League Cup as Tottenham reached the final at Wembley where, however, Stambouli was an unused substitute as Tottenham were beaten 2–0 by Chelsea. At the conclusion of his first year at Spurs, Stambouli had made just 12 appearances in the Premier League.

=== Paris Saint-Germain ===
On 20 July 2015, Paris Saint-Germain manager Laurent Blanc confirmed Stambouli would be joining PSG for a fee of £6 million, £1.3 million more than Tottenham had paid a year earlier. He made his debut on 1 August in the 2015 Trophée des Champions at the Stade Saputo in Montreal, playing the final 20 minutes in place of Marco Verratti in a 2–0 victory over Lyon. Stambouli played 40 total matches for PSG, winning all four domestic trophies in his one whole season, but did not score and assist and was unpopular with some fans due to his connections to their rival Marseille. His final match was the 2016 Trophée des Champions, which his team won 4–1 against Lyon in Austria.

=== Schalke 04 ===
After spending only one season with the French champions, Stambouli joined Germany's Schalke 04 on a four-year contract on 26 August 2016. He made his debut on 9 September in a 2–0 home loss to reigning champions FC Bayern Munich. On 20 May, he was sent off for unsportsmanlike conduct in the last game of the season, a 1–1 draw at FC Ingolstadt 04, and suspended for two matches.

Stambouli suffered a metatarsal injury in October 2019, ruling him out for the rest of the season. On 4 August 2020, he extended his contract with Schalke until 2023. Due to a clause in that deal, he left following their relegation in May 2021.

=== Adana Demirspor ===
On 26 July 2021, Stambouli joined Turkish club Adana Demirspor on a two-year contract. He was one of a number of high-profile players joining the newly promoted Süper Lig club that summer, including Mario Balotelli. He contributed two goals and four assists in 32 league matches in his first season, and one goal and five assists from 30 games in his second. His contract was then extended for another two years. He was the captain of the team in the 2023–24 season. He scored the first goal of Adana Demirspor in the European cup qualifying history against Cluj in the UEFA European Conference League in that season. On 31 January 2024, the club announced a mutual agreement with Stambouli to end his contract.

=== Reims ===
On 1 February 2024, Stambouli signed with Reims until the end of the season.

== International career ==
Stambouli played 14 times for France at under-21 level, from his debut on 8 October 2010 in a 2–0 friendly win over Turkey in Troyes.

Stambouli is eligible for the Algeria national team because his father was born there; in November 2018 he denied rumours that he would play for them.

== Career statistics ==
As of 17 May 2026

Appearances and goals by club, season and competition
Club	Season	League			National cup (Note: Includes Coupe de France, FA Cup, DFB-Pokal)		League cup (Note: Includes Coupe de la Ligue, EFL Cup)		Europe (Note: Includes UEFA Champions League, UEFA Europa League)		Other (Note: Includes Trophée des Champions)		Total	
Club	Season	Division	Apps	Goals	Apps	Goals	Apps	Goals	Apps	Goals	Apps	Goals	Apps	Goals
Montpellier	2010–11	Ligue 1	26	0	1	0	3	0	1	0	—		31	0
Montpellier	2011–12	Ligue 1	26	0	3	0	0	0	—		—		29	0
Montpellier	2012–13	Ligue 1	21	1	0	0	1	0	4	0	1	0	27	1
Montpellier	2013–14	Ligue 1	37	2	3	0	1	1	—		—		41	3
Montpellier	2014–15	Ligue 1	2	0	—		—		—		—		2	0
Montpellier	Total		112	3	7	0	5	1	5	0	1	0	130	4
Tottenham Hotspur	2014–15	Premier League	12	0	2	0	5	0	6	1	—		25	1
Paris St. Germain	2015–16	Ligue 1	27	0	6	0	3	0	2	0	1	0	39	0
Paris St. Germain	2016–17	Ligue 1	0	0	—		—		—		1	0	1	0
Paris St. Germain	Total		27	0	6	0	3	0	2	0	2	0	40	0
Schalke 04	2016–17	Bundesliga	23	0	3	0	—		11	0	—		37	0
Schalke 04	2017–18	Bundesliga	28	0	4	0	—		—		—		32	0
Schalke 04	2018–19	Bundesliga	21	0	1	0	—		5	0	—		27	0
Schalke 04	2019–20	Bundesliga	9	0	1	0	—		—		—		10	0
Schalke 04	2020–21	Bundesliga	24	0	3	0	—		—		—		27	0
Schalke 04	Total		105	0	12	0	—		16	0	—		133	0
Adana Demirspor	2021–22	Süper Lig	32	2	4	0	—		—		—		36	2
Adana Demirspor	2022–23	Süper Lig	30	1	1	0	—		—		—		31	1
Adana Demirspor	2023–24	Süper Lig	20	1	0	0	—		6	1	—		26	2
Adana Demirspor	Total		82	4	5	0	—		6	1	—		93	5
Reims	2023–24	Ligue 1	7	0	—		—		—		—		7	0
Metz	2024–25	Ligue 2	26	1	2	0	—		—		3 (Note: Appearances in Ligue 1 relegation/promotion play-offs)	0	31	1
Metz	2025–26	Ligue 1	19	0	2	0	—		—		—		21	0
Metz	Total		45	1	4	0	—		—		3	0	52	1
Career total			390	8	36	0	16	1	32	2	6	0	480	11

== Honours ==
Montpellier

- Ligue 1: 2011–12

Tottenham Hotspur

- Football League Cup runner-up: 2014–15

Paris Saint-Germain

- Ligue 1: 2015–16
- Coupe de France: 2015–16
- Coupe de la Ligue: 2015–16
- Trophée des Champions: 2015, 2016
