= 2015 Trophée des Champions =

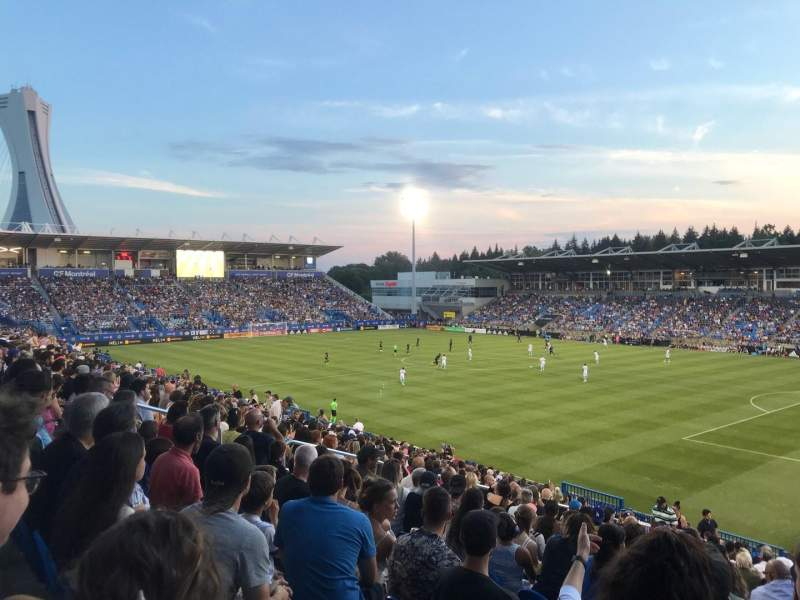
- The Saputo Stadium in Montreal hosted the match
- Event: Trophée des Champions
Paris Saint-Germain	Lyon
Ligue 1	Ligue 1
2	0
- Date: 1 August 2015
- Venue: Saputo Stadium, Montreal, Quebec, Canada
- Man of the Match: Serge Aurier
- Referee: Mathieu Bourdeau
- Attendance: 20,057
- Weather: 28°C, Sunny

The 2015 Trophée des Champions (English: 2015 Champions Trophy) was the 20th edition of the French supercup. The match was contested by the 2014–15 Ligue 1 and Coupe de France champions Paris Saint-Germain and the runners-up of the Ligue 1, Lyon. The match was played at Saputo Stadium in Montreal, Quebec, Canada.

This was the seventh consecutive time the competition had taken place on international soil and the second time it was contested in Montreal after the 2009 edition at the neighbouring Olympic Stadium. PSG were the two-time defending champions, having defeated Guingamp in the 2014 edition, which was played in China.

== Match ==
=== Details ===
1 August 2015
EDT

Paris Saint-Germain	2–0	Lyon
Aurier 11'; Cavani 17'	Report

Saputo Stadium, Montreal, Quebec (Canada)
Attendance: 20,057
Referee: Mathieu Bourdeau

Paris Saint-Germain	Lyon

GK	16	(Germany) Kevin Trapp
RB	19	(Ivory Coast) Serge Aurier
CB	32	(Brazil) David Luiz	(yellow card) 81'
CB	2	(Brazil) Thiago Silva (c)
LB	17	(Brazil) Maxwell
RM	6	(Italy) Marco Verratti	(yellow card) 60'	(substituted off) 70'
CM	14	(France) Blaise Matuidi
LM	25	(France) Adrien Rabiot
RF	9	(Uruguay) Edinson Cavani		(substituted off) 63'
CF	10	(Sweden) Zlatan Ibrahimović
LF	7	(Brazil) Lucas Moura		(substituted off) 82'
Substitutes:
GK	30	(Italy) Salvatore Sirigu
DF	5	(Brazil) Marquinhos
DF	21	(France) Lucas Digne
MF	4	(France) Benjamin Stambouli		(substituted on) 70'
MF	8	(Italy) Thiago Motta
FW	15	(France) Jean-Christophe Bahebeck		(substituted on) 82'
FW	29	(France) Jean-Kévin Augustin		(substituted on) 63'
Manager:
(France) Laurent Blanc

GK	1	(Portugal) Anthony Lopes
RB	13	(France) Christophe Jallet
CB	4	(Burkina Faso) Bakary Koné
CB	23	(France) Samuel Umtiti
LB	3	(Cameroon) Henri Bedimo
RM	12	(France) Jordan Ferri		(substituted off) 79'
CM	21	(France) Maxime Gonalons (c)	(yellow card) 37' (red card) 64'
LM	8	(France) Corentin Tolisso
RF	25	(Algeria) Yassine Benzia		(substituted off) 67'
CF	10	(France) Alexandre Lacazette
LF	9	(France) Claudio Beauvue
Substitutes:
GK	16	(France) Lucas Mocio
DF	15	(France) Jérémy Morel
DF	22	(France) Lindsay Rose
MF	11	(Algeria) Rachid Ghezzal		(substituted on) 67'
MF	17	(France) Steed Malbranque		(substituted on) 79'
MF	28	(France) Arnold Mvuemba
MF	32	(France) Zakarie Labidi
Manager:
(France) Hubert Fournier

MATCH OFFICIALS

- Principle Referee : Mathieu Bourdeau
- Assistant referees: Daniel Belleau Richard Gamache
- Fourth official: Francis Latulippe
- Principle Delegate: Arnaud Rouger
- Assistant Delegate: Bernard Docquiert

MATCH RULES

- 90 minutes.
- Penalty shoot-out if scores level after 90 minutes.
- Seven named substitutes
- Maximum of six substitutions.

== See also ==
- 2015–16 Ligue 1
- 2015–16 Coupe de France
- 2015–16 Olympique Lyonnais season
- 2015–16 Paris Saint-Germain FC season
- 2009 Trophée des Champions
