= Serge Aurier =

Ivorian footballer (born 1992)

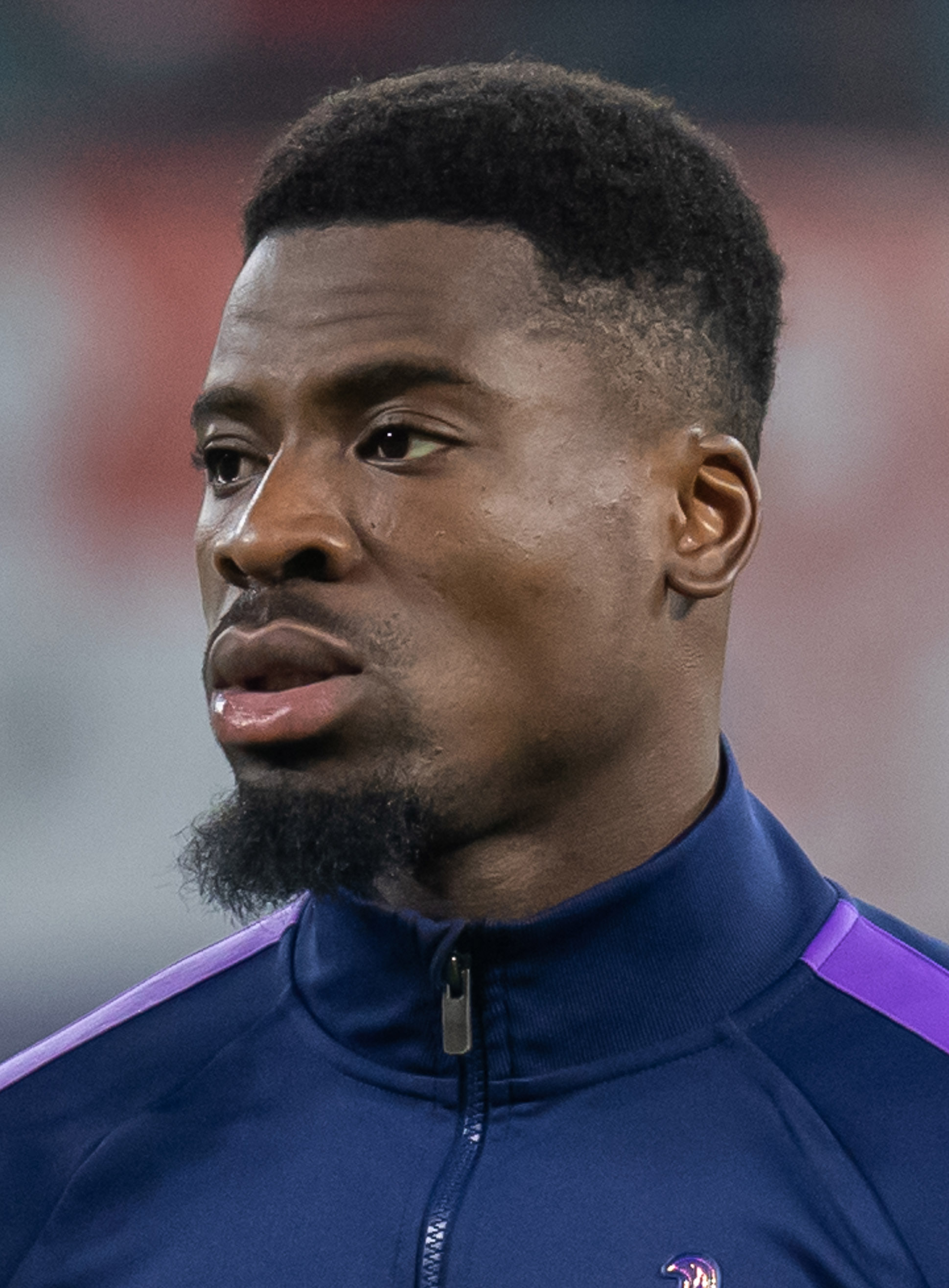
- Aurier with Tottenham Hotspur in 2020

Personal information
- Full name: Serge Alain Stéphane Aurier
- Date of birth: 24 December 1992 (age 33)
- Place of birth: Ouragahio, Ivory Coast
- Height: 1.76 m (5 ft 9 in)
- Position: Right-back

Youth career
- 2006–2009: Lens

Senior career*
Years	Team	Apps	(Gls)
2009–2011	Lens II	24	(1)
2009–2012	Lens	40	(0)
2012–2015	Toulouse	72	(8)
2014–2015	→ Paris Saint-Germain (loan)	14	(0)
2015–2017	Paris Saint-Germain	43	(2)
2017–2021	Tottenham Hotspur	77	(5)
2021–2022	Villarreal	19	(0)
2022–2024	Nottingham Forest	36	(1)
2024	Galatasaray	4	(0)
2025	Persepolis	5	(0)

International career^{‡}
2013–2024	Ivory Coast	93	(4)
Medal record
Representing Ivory Coast
Men's football
Africa Cup of Nations
Winner	2015 Equatorial Guinea
Winner	2023 Ivory Coast
- * Club domestic league appearances and goals as of 15 May 2026 (UTC) ‡ National team caps and goals as of 11 February 2024 (UTC)

Serge Alain Stéphane Aurier (French: [sɛʁʒ oʁje]; born 24 December 1992) is an Ivorian former professional footballer who played as a right-back.

Aurier moved to France as a child and played for Lens, Toulouse and Paris Saint-Germain, winning 11 major trophies with the latter. He totalled 195 appearances in France and was twice named in Ligue 1's Team of the Year. In 2017, he joined Tottenham Hotspur for a fee of around £23 million and left after mutual termination of his contract in August 2021.

Aurier made his international debut for the Ivory Coast in 2013 and has earned over 90 caps, serving as captain since 2017. He represented the nation at the 2014 FIFA World Cup and five Africa Cup of Nations tournaments, winning the 2015 and 2023 editions.

== Club career ==
=== Lens ===
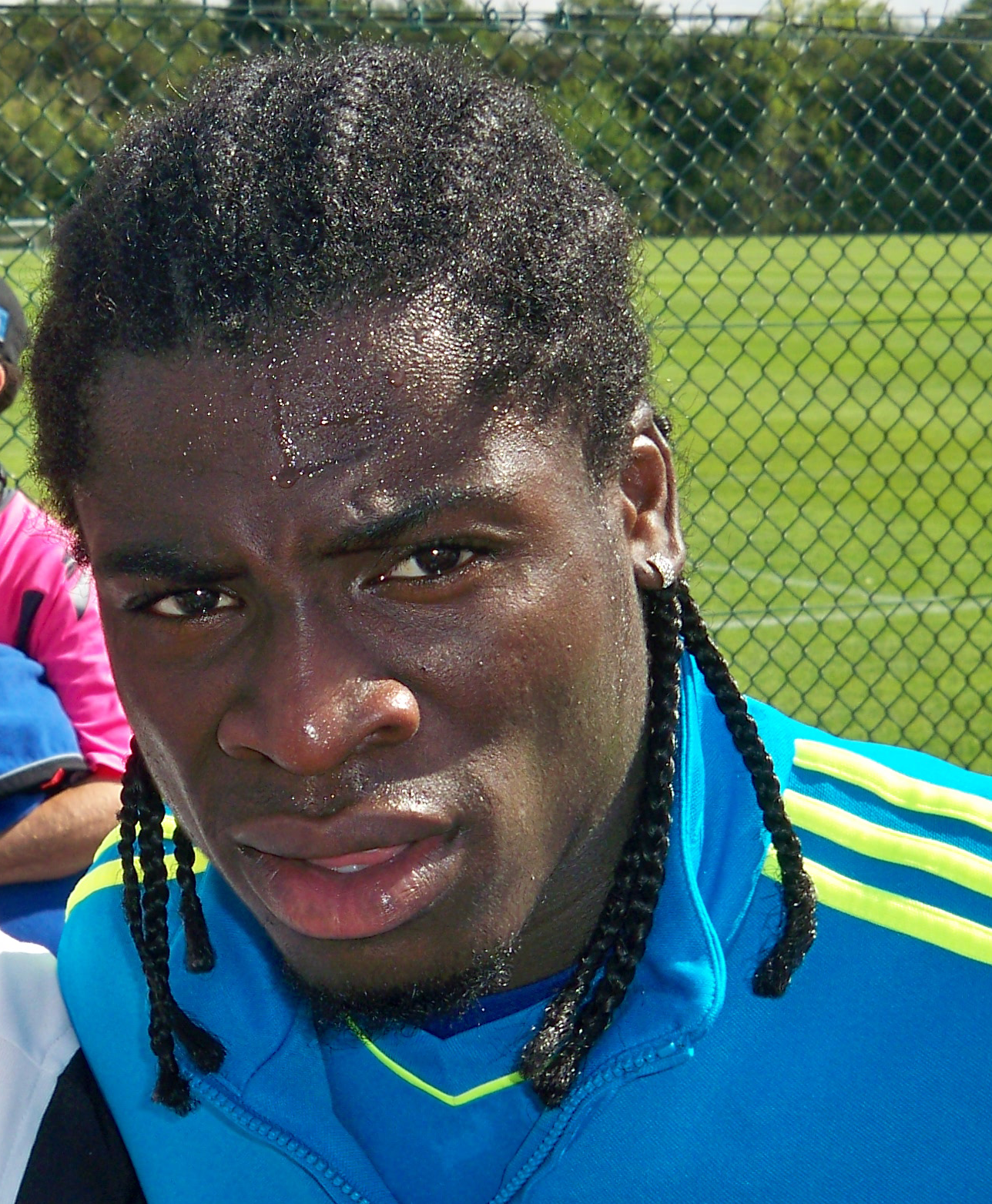
Aurier in 2011

Aurier played for various youth teams and academies before he was accepted to join Villepinte. He then joined Lens in Ligue 1, where this started his professional footballing career. Shortly after, Aurier, who was then thirteen at the time, had to leave his friends and family as a result of joining Lens. There, Aurier was assigned to the club's reserve team and at a point, was the club's captain in the reserve team. In June 2009, Aurier signed his first professional contract with Lens.

Aurier made his professional debut for the club in a 1–0 win over Saint-Étienne on 22 December 2009. Aurier was given another opportunity in the Round of 16 of Coupe de la Ligue, a 2–1 loss against Lorient. He soon sustained a shoulder injury that left him out for two or three weeks. Despite this, Aurier went on to make five appearances for Lens in his first season.

Aurier's second season saw him break into the first team, and although he went on to make 26 appearances in 2010–11, the club was relegated to Ligue 2 after finishing second-last in the league table, at 19th. Prior to club's relegation, Aurier had signed a contract extension with the club through to 2015.

Ahead of the 2011–12 season, Aurier's performance soon attracted interest from clubs around England, with the player considering departing Lens for a new opportunity. However, Aurier ruled out a move abroad, implying that regardless of whether or not Aurier chose to stay or leave Lens, he would be footballing for a member of France's principal league. Despite this, however, Aurier began the year with Lens, making 16 appearances in the first half of the season around which time the club was facing financial issues.

=== Toulouse ===
On 26 January 2012, Aurier ultimately left Lens, signing for Toulouse on a four-and-a-half-year deal. The move came after Toulouse's president hinted he would sign Aurier for a €1.5 million transfer fee.

Aurier made his debut for the club two days later, in a 2–1 win over Caen. He then scored his first goal for Toulouse in a 2–1 loss against Lille on 1 April 2012. Soon after, Aurier sprained his ankle which saw him miss six matches, though he was back for the last game of the season, which saw Toulouse lose 2–0 against Ajaccio. In his first half-season at Toulouse, he made ten appearances.

In his first full season at Toulouse in 2012–13, Aurier provided an assist for Wissam Ben Yedder, but was sent-off in the 84th minute for a challenge on Henri Bedimo in a 1–1 draw with Montpellier. His sending off saw him suspended for three games with one-year suspended. After serving his two games, Aurier made his return on 1 September 2012 in a 1–1 draw against Reims. He scored his first goal of the season on 11 January 2013, in a 2–2 draw against Saint-Étienne. Aurier was sidelined later on in the season after tearing a hamstring and injuring his right knee. Despite being on the sidelines for a period of time, Aurier made 28 appearances, scoring one goal.

Ahead of the 2013–14 season, Aurier signed a contract extension, keeping him at Toulouse until 2018. This came after re-ignited interest in his services from clubs around Europe. Under the management of Alain Casanova, Aurier found himself playing in a 3–5–2 formation as a right-sided centre back in the three-man defence, as well as a wing-back at times. He went on to play an attacking role by assisting two goals in two different matches by the end of September. Aurier then scored his first goal of the season in a 2–1 loss against Evian on 2 November 2013. His second goal of the season came on 2 February 2014, in a 2–2 draw against Marseille. His third goal of the season came on 15 February 2014 in a 3–1 win over Lorient. He went on to score two goals in two games against Reims and Rennes. His sixth goal of the season came on 5 April 2014 in a 2–1 loss against Lille. Aurier went on to make 34 appearances, scoring six times. At the end of the 2013–14 season, Aurier was shortlisted for the Ligue 1 Player of the Year for the first time in his career. He was also named as the second-best player African player in Ligue 1.

After an impressive display at the 2014 FIFA World Cup for the Ivory Coast, Aurier was again linked with a move away from Toulouse. In an interview, Aurier stated that his dream move would be to English club Arsenal of the Premier League and claimed that he could not turn them down if they made an offer for him.

=== Paris Saint-Germain ===
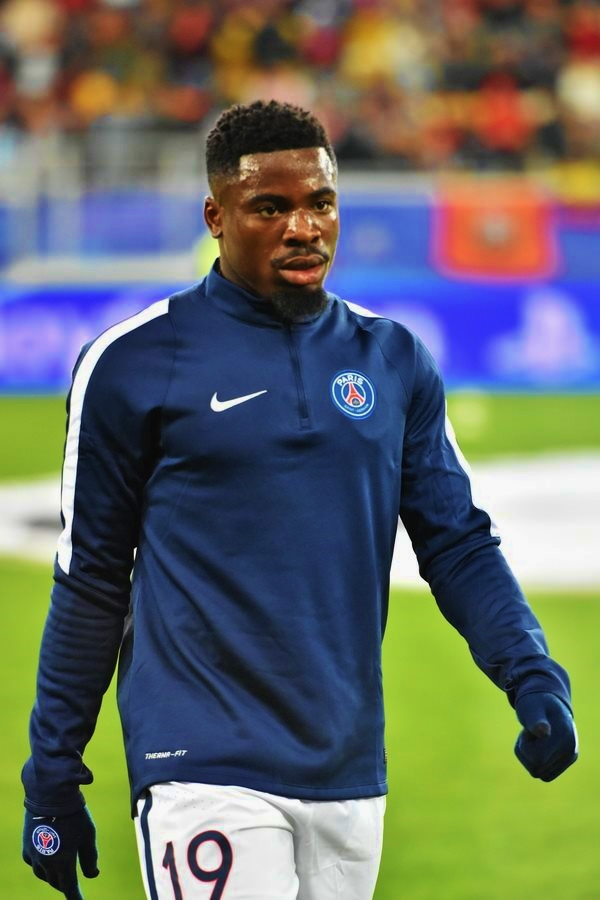
Aurier playing for Paris Saint-Germain in 2015

On 23 July 2014, Aurier joined Paris Saint-Germain on a season-long loan with an option for the Parisian club to purchase outright. His move to PSG was believed to be as a replacement for incumbent right back Christophe Jallet. Upon moving to PSG, Aurier stated he had no concern over his first-team chances, despite facing competition from Gregory van der Wiel, who also plays primarily as a right back.

Aurier made his PSG debut in the 2014–15 Ligue 1, coming on as a substitute for Van der Wiel in a 2–0 win over Bastia on 16 August 2014. He scored his first goal for PSG in the Round of 16 of Coupe de la Ligue in a 3–1 victory over Ajaccio. In the first half of the season, Aurier was unable to establish himself in the first team due to his own injury concerns and international commitments. Aurier played his first PSG match in one month – lasting the entire 90 minutes – in a 2–2 draw against Caen; his performance was later praised after the match. During the match, however, he injured himself and was not substituted out, as manager Laurent Blanc had previously used all three of his substitutions earlier in the match. Whilst on the sidelines in PSG's UEFA Champions League match against Chelsea, Aurier found himself in trouble with UEFA after criticising Björn Kuipers's refereeing decision and calling him a "dirty son of a bitch" in a video posted on Facebook. Though Aurier later apologised for his actions, UEFA nonetheless suspended him for three matches.

On 29 April 2015, Aurier secured a permanent move to PSG, signing a four-year contract. Aurier's first game after signing for the club on a permanent basis came in the Trophée des Champions against Lyon, where he scored his first PSG goal and helped the club win 2–0. Aurier found himself competing with Van der Wiel over a right position under the management of Blanc. Aurier scored his first league goal for PSG goal on 26 September 2015 in a 4–1 win over Nantes. For his performance, Aurier was named Team of the Week by L'Équipe. Four days later, Aurier scored in the Champions League group stage in a 3–0 win over Shakhtar Donetsk. Aurier scored against Lyon for the second time in the season three months later on 13 December 2015, helping his team to a 5–1 victory.

Aurier was suspended indefinitely on 14 February 2016 for calling teammate Ángel Di María a "clown" and calling Blanc a "fiotte" (a homophobic slur) during a question-and-answer session on Periscope in which he also criticised supposed favouritism towards striker Zlatan Ibrahimović. Following his suspension, PSG ordered Aurier to train with their reserve side from 29 February until 20 March.

=== Tottenham Hotspur ===
On 31 August 2017, Aurier signed for Premier League club Tottenham Hotspur for a fee in the region of £23 million. He made his debut on 13 September in a 3–1 win over Borussia Dortmund at Wembley Stadium in the 2017–18 UEFA Champions League. Ten days later, Aurier made his full league debut at West Ham United, but he was sent off upon receiving a second yellow card as Tottenham held on for a 3–2 victory. His first goal for the club came in a 2–0 home win against Brighton & Hove Albion on 13 December 2017. Aurier competed for the right-back spot with Kieran Trippier throughout the season.

In his second season in London, Aurier was competing for his place not only against Trippier, but also with young Englishman Kyle Walker-Peters. On 4 January 2019, in an FA Cup third round match away to EFL League Two club Tranmere Rovers, he scored twice in a 7–0 win. He suffered a number of injuries this season, including a hamstring injury while on international duty in March 2019, as a result he only played eight Premier League games, 17 in all competitions, this season for Tottenham.

Despite talks of wanting to leave the club in the summer, Aurier made a successful first appearance in the 2019–20 season in the match against Crystal Palace on 14 September, helping the team win 4–0 by providing an assist for a Son Heung-min goal. He also provided the most crosses from open play in the match, one of which was deflected by a Palace defender as an own goal. Two weeks later, he was sent off in the first half of a 2–1 home win over Southampton.

In the 2020–21 season, Aurier scored his first goal of the season away to Manchester United on 4 October 2020, contributing to a 6–1 win that was Tottenham's biggest at Old Trafford and their best result against United since 1932. On 31 August 2021, following the signing of Emerson Royal, he departed after the mutual termination of his contract with one year remaining.

=== Villarreal ===
On 4 October 2021, Spanish side Villarreal announced the signing of Aurier until the end of the 2021–22 season, with the option of extending the contract for two more years. He made his debut 20 days later in a 2–1 loss at Athletic Bilbao, as a 65th-minute substitute for former Spurs teammate Juan Foyth. Troubled by injury, he was second-choice to the Argentine over the season.

=== Nottingham Forest ===
On 7 September 2022, Nottingham Forest announced the signing of Aurier. On 1 January 2023, he scored his first goal at the club in a 1–1 draw against Chelsea.

=== Galatasaray ===
On 2 February 2024, Turkish side Galatasaray officially declared the acquisition of Aurier until the end of the season.

=== Persepolis ===
On 31 July 2025, Aurier signed for Persian Gulf Pro League club Persepolis. Upon signing for the club, the Disciplinary Committee of the Iranian Football Federation banned Aurier from all football-related activities, including participation in club training, until further notice as the player was tested positive for Hepatitis B in the club's medical tests. He left the club in December 2025.

== International career ==
Despite having lived in France for over 14 years, Aurier did not hold French nationality until 2016. He had originally turned down the chance to play for the Ivory Coast. However, he was called up by manager Sabri Lamouchi in April 2013, and eventually played his first match for his homeland against the Gambia on 8 June that year.

Aurier was included in Ivory Coast's 23-man squad for the 2014 World Cup. In the first group match, against Japan, he provided assists for both Wilfried Bony and Gervinho in a 2–1 win.

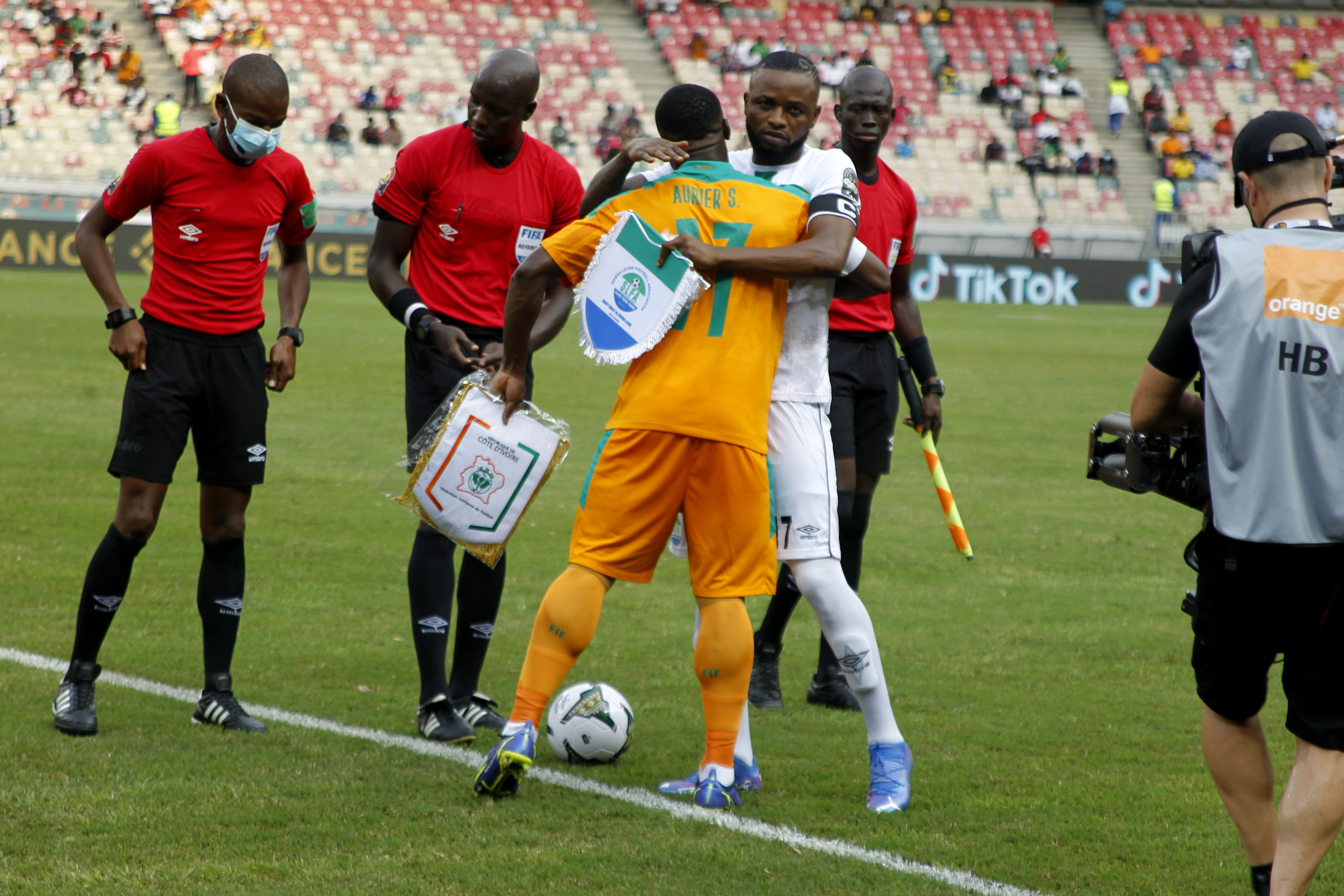
Aurier (in orange) greets Sierra Leone captain Umaru Bangura at the 2021 Africa Cup of Nations

On 29 December 2014, Aurier was called up for the Africa Cup of Nations. He played six matches and impressed with his displays in the tournament, particularly in the final. He was shortlisted for the CAF Team of the Tournament.

In October 2016, during a World Cup Qualifier against Mali, Aurier rushed to the aid of Mali midfielder, Moussa Doumbia, who had had an epileptic seizure, to prevent him from swallowing his tongue. Despite his good deed, Aurier later drew criticism for celebrating Ivory Coast's second goal with a 'slit throat' gesture.

Aurier scored his first goal for the Elephants on 11 January 2017, in a 3–0 friendly win over Uganda in Abu Dhabi, after earlier assisting Jonathan Kodjia. He was made captain of the national team starting with a friendly against the Netherlands, followed by a match against Guinea in the 2019 Africa Cup of Nations qualification rounds in June 2017. He was also captain at the 2019 Africa Cup of Nations, but suffered a hamstring injury in a 1–0 defeat against Morocco and could not participate further in the competition.

Aurier skippered the team at the 2021 Africa Cup of Nations in Cameroon. In the second group game, a 2–2 draw with Sierra Leone, he played in goal for the final seconds after goalkeeper Badra Ali Sangaré was injured while letting in Alhaji Kamara's equaliser; the campaign ended on penalties to Egypt in the last 16. He later achieved the 2023 Africa Cup of Nations with his national team, hosted on home soil.

== Personal life ==
Born in Ouragahio, Ivory Coast, Aurier moved to France when he was young, after his parents wanted their children to have a better life. He was passionate about football while growing up. Aurier's younger brother, Christopher, played for his former club Lens. In the early hours of the morning on 13 July 2020, Christopher was shot dead outside a nightclub in Toulouse, France.

On 26 September 2016, Aurier was found guilty of assaulting a police officer outside a nightclub in Paris. He was sentenced to two months in prison, but remained at liberty pending an appeal. Although UK authorities granted Aurier a visa in October 2016, it was revoked on 16 November due to his conviction, and as a result, he missed the UEFA Champions League match against Arsenal in London that month. Aurier was originally banned from entering the UK for five years from his conviction, but he was permitted to move to Tottenham in 2017 because his suspended sentence had been converted into a fine.

== Career statistics ==
=== Club ===
As of match played 26 December 2025

Appearances and goals by club, season and competition
Club	Season	League			National cup		League cup		Europe		Other		Total	
Club	Season	Division	Apps	Goals	Apps	Goals	Apps	Goals	Apps	Goals	Apps	Goals	Apps	Goals
Lens II	2009–10	CFA	22	1	—		—		—		—		22	1
Lens II	2010–11	CFA	2	0	—		—		—		—		2	0
Lens II	Total		24	1	—		—		—		—		24	1
Lens	2009–10	Ligue 1	5	0	6	0	0	0	—		—		11	0
Lens	2010–11	Ligue 1	19	0	1	0	1	0	—		—		21	0
Lens	2011–12	Ligue 2	16	0	0	0	4	0	—		—		20	0
Lens	Total		40	0	7	0	5	0	—		—		52	0
Toulouse	2011–12	Ligue 1	10	1	0	0	0	0	—		—		10	1
Toulouse	2012–13	Ligue 1	28	1	2	0	2	0	—		—		32	1
Toulouse	2013–14	Ligue 1	34	6	2	0	2	0	—		—		38	6
Toulouse	Total		72	8	4	0	4	0	—		—		80	8
Toulouse II	2012–13	CFA 2	1	1	—		—		—		—		1	1
Paris Saint-Germain (loan)	2014–15	Ligue 1	14	0	0	0	2	0	0	0	0	0	16	0
Paris Saint-Germain	2015–16	Ligue 1	21	2	4	0	2	0	5 (Note: Appearances in UEFA Champions League)	1	1 (Note: Appearance in Trophée des Champions)	1	33	4
Paris Saint-Germain	2016–17	Ligue 1	22	0	3	0	1	0	5	0	1	0	32	0
Paris Saint-Germain	Total		57	2	7	0	5	0	10	1	2	1	81	4
Paris Saint-Germain II	2015–16	CFA	1	0	—		—		—		—		1	0
Tottenham Hotspur	2017–18	Premier League	17	2	1	0	0	0	6	0	—		24	2
Tottenham Hotspur	2018–19	Premier League	8	0	1	2	3	0	5	0	—		17	2
Tottenham Hotspur	2019–20	Premier League	33	1	4	0	0	0	5	1	—		42	2
Tottenham Hotspur	2020–21	Premier League	19	2	0	0	3	0	5 (Note: Appearances in UEFA Europa League)	0	—		27	2
Tottenham Hotspur	Total		77	5	6	2	6	0	21	1	—		110	8
Villarreal	2021–22	La Liga	19	0	0	0	—		5	0	—		24	0
Nottingham Forest	2022–23	Premier League	24	1	0	0	4	0	—		—		28	1
Nottingham Forest	2023–24	Premier League	12	0	0	0	1	0	—		—		13	0
Nottingham Forest	Total		36	1	0	0	5	0	—		—		41	1
Galatasaray	2023–24	Süper Lig	4	0	—		—		—		—		4	0
Persepolis	2025–26	Persian Gulf Pro League	5	0	0	0	—		—		—		5	0
Career total			336	18	24	2	25	0	36	2	2	1	423	23

=== International ===
As of match played 11 February 2024

Appearances and goals by national team and year
National team	Year	Apps	Goals
Ivory Coast	2013	6	0
Ivory Coast	2014	11	0
Ivory Coast	2015	12	0
Ivory Coast	2016	5	0
Ivory Coast	2017	11	1
Ivory Coast	2018	6	0
Ivory Coast	2019	11	1
Ivory Coast	2020	4	0
Ivory Coast	2021	8	1
Ivory Coast	2022	9	1
Ivory Coast	2023	4	0
Ivory Coast	2024	6	0
Total		93	4

As of match played 3 June 2022. Ivory Coast score listed first, score column indicates score after each Aurier goal.

List of international goals scored by Serge Aurier
No.	Date	Venue	Opponent	Score	Result	Competition
1	11 January 2017	New York University Stadium, Abu Dhabi, United Arab Emirates	Uganda	3–0	3–0	Friendly
2	19 November 2019	Bahir Dar Stadium, Bahir Dar, Ethiopia	Ethiopia	1–0	1–2	2021 Africa Cup of Nations qualification
3	26 March 2021	Stade Général Seyni Kountché, Niamey, Niger	Niger	1–0	3–0	2021 Africa Cup of Nations qualification
4	3 June 2022	Stade de Yamoussoukro, Yamoussoukro, Ivory Coast	Zambia	1–0	3–1	2023 Africa Cup of Nations qualification

== Honours ==
Paris Saint-Germain

- Ligue 1: 2014–15, 2015–16
- Coupe de France: 2014–15, 2015–16, 2016–17
- Coupe de la Ligue: 2014–15, 2015–16, 2016–17
- Trophée des Champions: 2014, 2015, 2016

Tottenham Hotspur

- EFL Cup runner-up: 2020–21
- UEFA Champions League runner-up: 2018–19

Galatasaray

- Süper Lig: 2023–24
- Turkish Super Cup: 2023

Ivory Coast

- Africa Cup of Nations: 2015, 2023

Individual

- CAF Team of the Year: 2015, 2016, 2018, 2019
- Africa Cup of Nations Team of the Tournament: 2015
- Ligue 1 Team of the Year: 2013–14, 2015–16
- FIFPro World XI 5th team: 2016
