= Timothée Taufflieb =

French footballer (born 1992)

Personal information
- Date of birth: 1 December 1992 (age 33)
- Place of birth: Colombes, France
- Height: 1.72 m (5 ft 8 in)
- Position: Midfielder

Team information
- Current team: Mâcon
- Number: 13

Senior career*
Years	Team	Apps	(Gls)
2013–2016	Paris Saint-Germain B	48	(11)
2016	Paris Saint-Germain	1	(0)
2016–2019	Quevilly-Rouen	90	(10)
2017–2019	Quevilly-Rouen B	2	(0)
2019–2023	Villefranche	115	(10)
2023–	Mâcon	10	(0)
- * Club domestic league appearances and goals as of 2 December 2023

Timothée Taufflieb (born 1 December 1992) is a French professional footballer who plays for Championnat National 3 club Mâcon as a midfielder.

== Career ==
Beginning his career with Paris Saint-Germain B, Taufflieb was called up to the senior team Paris Saint-Germain making his debut in a 6–0 Ligue 1 win over Caen on 16 April 2016. With his brief appearance, Taufflieb helped Paris win the 2015–16 Ligue 1 and earned himself a winner's trophy. Fearing limited first team opportunities, Taufflieb moved to Quevilly-Rouen and helped them get promoted to the Ligue 2 in 2017. In July 2019 he signed for FC Villefranche.

== Honours ==
Paris Saint-Germain

- Ligue 1: 2015–16
