= Gustavo Hebling =

Brazilian footballer (born 1996)

Personal information
- Full name: Gustavo Hebling de Aguiar
- Date of birth: 5 April 1996 (age 30)
- Place of birth: Piracicaba, Brazil
- Height: 1.73 m (5 ft 8 in)
- Position: Midfielder

Youth career
- 2007–2015: São Paulo

Senior career*
Years	Team	Apps	(Gls)
2015–2017	Paris Saint-Germain B	0	(0)
2015–2017	→ PEC Zwolle (loan)	11	(0)
2017–2020	Portimonense	0	(0)
2020	CSA	2	(1)
2020	Remo		
2020–2022	XV de Piracicaba	12	(0)
2022	Oeste	16	(0)
2023	ABC	5	(0)
2023–2024	Botoșani	1	(0)
2024–	Inter de Limeira	1	(0)

International career^{‡}
2012–2013	Brazil U17	8	(0)
- * Club domestic league appearances and goals ‡ National team caps and goals as of 3 May 2024

Gustavo Hebling de Aguiar (born 5 April 1996) is a Brazilian professional footballer who plays as a midfielder.

== Career ==
On 4 August 2023, Hebling signed a contract with Romanian side Botoșani.
