= Marco Verratti =

Italian footballer (born 1992)

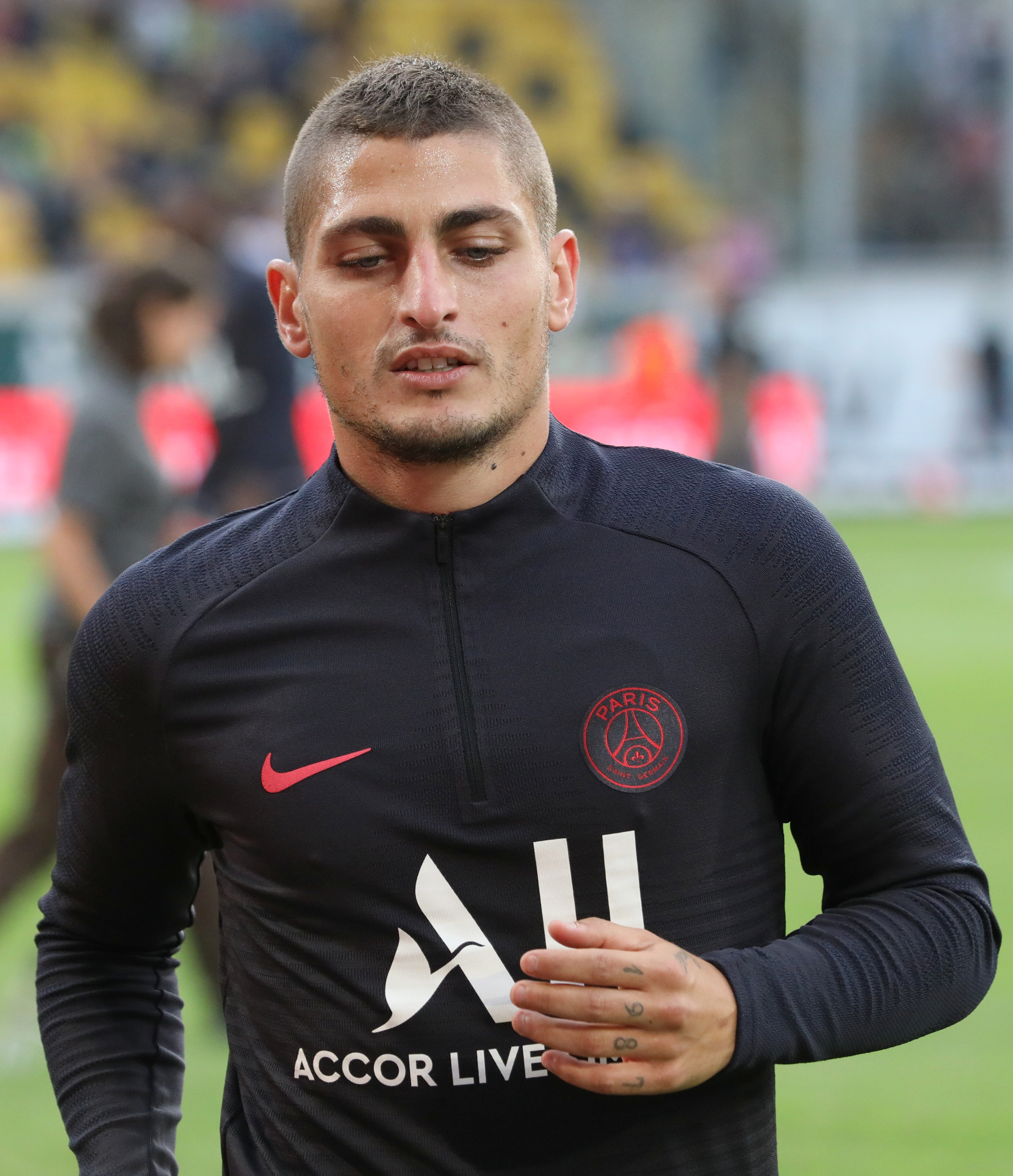
- Verratti with Paris Saint-Germain in 2019

Personal information
- Full name: Marco Verratti
- Date of birth: 5 November 1992 (age 34)
- Place of birth: Pescara, Italy
- Height: 1.65 m (5 ft 5 in)
- Position: Midfielder

Team information
- Current team: Al Duhail
- Number: 6

Youth career
- 2000–2001: Manoppello
- 2001–2006: Manoppello Arabona
- 2006–2008: Pescara

Senior career*
Years	Team	Apps	(Gls)
2008–2012	Pescara	74	(2)
2012–2023	Paris Saint-Germain	276	(7)
2023–2025	Al-Arabi	33	(4)
2025–	Al Duhail	14	(1)

International career
2010–2011	Italy U19	4	(0)
2011–2012	Italy U20	4	(0)
2012–2013	Italy U21	7	(0)
2012–2023	Italy	55	(3)
Medal record
Men's Football
Representing Italy
UEFA European Championship
Winner	2020 Europe
UEFA Nations League
Third place	2021 Italy
Third place	2023 Netherlands
UEFA European Under-21 Championship
Second place	2013 Israel
- * Club domestic league appearances and goals as of 18 October 2026

Marco Verratti Cavaliere OMRI (Italian pronunciation: [ˈmarko verˈratti]; born 5 November 1992) is an Italian professional footballer who plays as a central midfielder for Qatar Stars League club Al Duhail.

A technically gifted playmaker, Verratti began his career with Italian club Pescara in 2008, where he soon rose to prominence as one of the best young midfielders in Europe, helping the team to win the 2011–12 Serie B title, and winning the 2012 Bravo Award. His playing style drew comparisons with Andrea Pirlo, due to his passing ability, vision, and control, as well as his similar transition from the role of trequartista to that of a regista. In July 2012, he transferred to French side Paris Saint-Germain, where he won a then-record nine Ligue 1 titles, among other domestic and individual trophies, and established himself as one of the best midfielders in the world. He ranks third for all-time appearances for the club.

At youth international level, Verratti represented the Italy under-21 side at the 2013 UEFA European Under-21 Championship, winning a runners-up medal, and being named to the all-star squad for the tournament. At senior level, he made his Italy debut in 2012, going on to represent his country at the 2014 FIFA World Cup and UEFA Euro 2020, winning the latter tournament.

== Early life ==
Verratti was born in Pescara, and grew up in Manoppello. As a child, he supported Juventus and idolised Alessandro Del Piero, the team's Italian international offensive playmaker. Verratti's talent was noticed at an early age, and he was made offers to join the youth academies of Atalanta and Internazionale, but joined his local club Pescara for €5,000. After an impressive performance for Pescara's under-16 team against AC Milan, the Lombardy club offered €300,000 to sign the midfielder, but Verratti decided to remain at Pescara.

== Club career ==
=== Pescara ===
==== 2001–06: Youth career ====
The first youth team Verratti was affiliated with was that of Manoppello, a historic team of Pescara, that in 2001 merged with the newly born Manoppello Arabona. He remained there until 2006 when he entered the youth of Pescara.

==== 2008–10: Debut season and key performances ====
Verratti made his first team debut in the 2008–09 season at the age of 15 years and 9 months. In the 2009–10 season, he appeared more regularly for Pescara, and since then became a key player in the first team. His performances generated national media coverage as a potential star of the future and Italian international.

==== 2011–12: Player of the season and departure ====
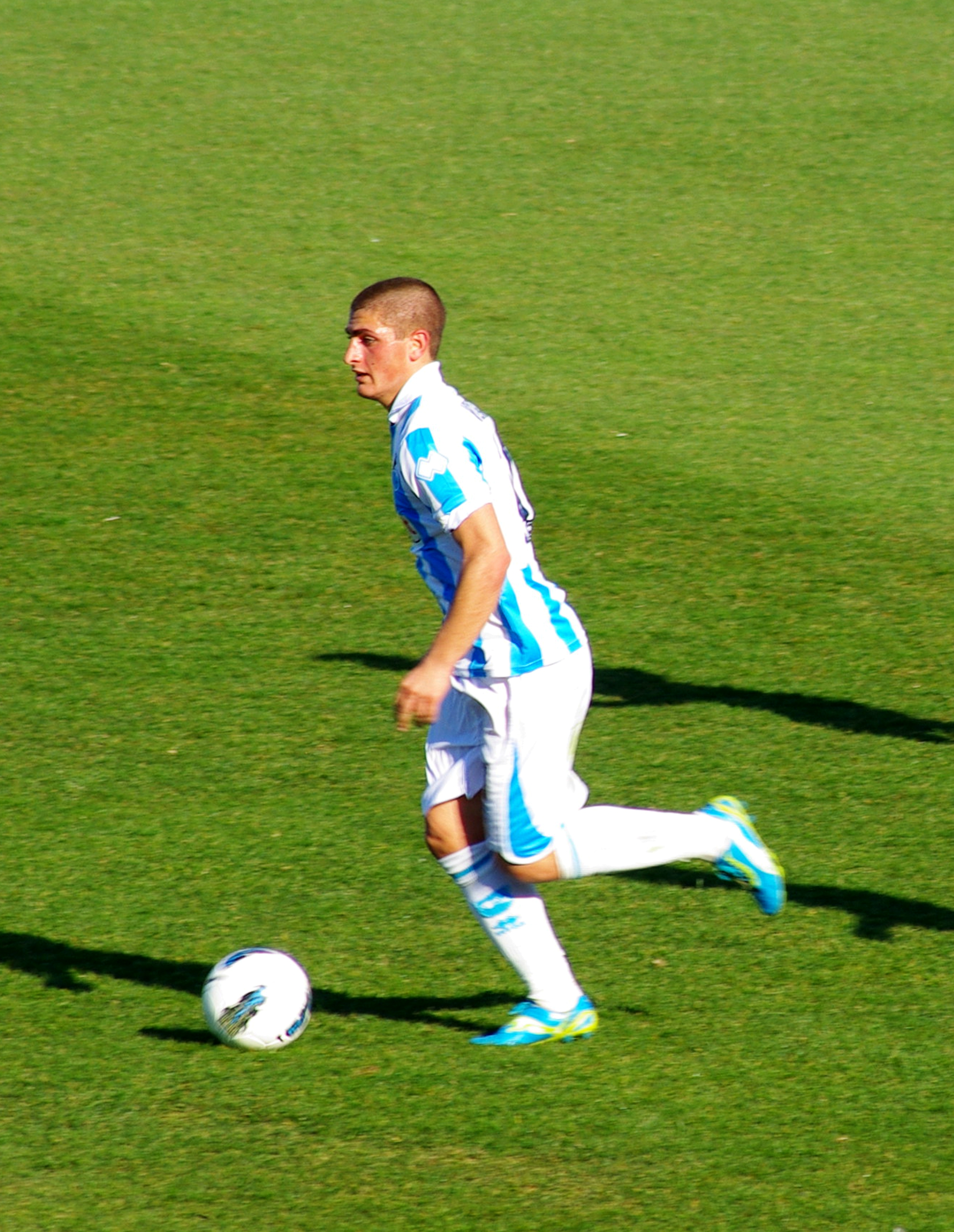
Verratti playing for Pescara in 2012

With Zdeněk Zeman as manager, Verratti excelled as a deep-lying playmaker in a Pescara team which won the 2011–12 Serie B title playing "the best football in Italy", earning promotion to Serie A the following season. After helping Pescara to promotion to Serie A, Verratti received the 2012 Bravo Award for the best player under the age of 21 in Europe, and was reportedly wanted by Napoli, Roma and Juventus, as well as Carlo Ancelotti's Paris Saint-Germain. At the 2012 AIC Gran Gala del Calcio, he was elected the best player of the 2011–12 Serie B season, along with former Pescara teammates Ciro Immobile and Lorenzo Insigne.

=== Paris Saint-Germain ===
==== 2012–2014: Debut season and individual awards ====
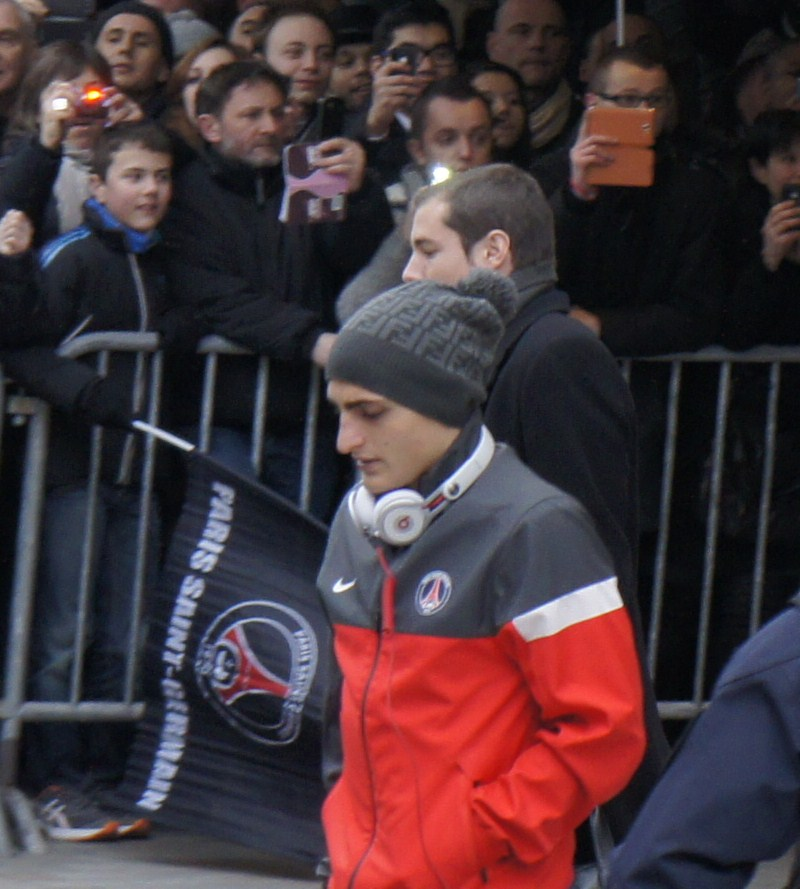
Verratti with Paris Saint-Germain in 2013

On 18 July 2012, Verratti signed a five-year contract with Paris Saint-Germain in Ligue 1. On 2 September 2012, Verratti made his competitive debut for PSG in an away Ligue 1 match against Lille. Twelve days later, he assisted Javier Pastore's opening goal in his first competitive appearance at the Parc des Princes, a 2–0 Ligue 1 defeat of Toulouse.

On 18 September 2012, he made his UEFA Champions League debut in a 4–1 group stage defeat of Dynamo Kyiv. He ended his first season in the French capital by winning the 2012–13 Ligue 1 title. On 20 August 2013, Verratti signed a one-year extension to his contract with PSG, keeping him at the club until 2018.

Verratti's second season with PSG was even more successful than the first as the team retained its Ligue 1 title and won the Coupe de la Ligue and the 2013 Trophée des Champions. Verratti was named as the Ligue 1 Young Player of the Year and included in the Ligue 1 Team of the Year for the 2013–14 season.

==== 2014–2017: First goals and contract extension ====
On 30 September 2014, Verratti scored his first competitive goal for PSG, a header in a 3–2 home win over Barcelona in the group stage of the Champions League. On 18 January 2015, Verratti scored his first goal in Ligue 1, in a 4–2 home win over Evian.

In August 2016, Verratti signed a three-year extension to his contract, keeping him at the club until 2021.

==== 2017–2019: European and domestic performances ====
On 6 March 2018, Verratti was sent off after acquiring a second yellow card in the second leg of a Champions League round of 16 fixture against the eventual champions Real Madrid. Real Madrid went on to win the game 2–1 and eliminated PSG with an aggregate score of 5–2.

On 3 April 2019, Verratti scored the opening goal from a Kylian Mbappé assist in a 3–0 home win over Nantes in the Coupe de France semi-finals, which allowed PSG to advance to the final of the competition; during the same match, he also provided an assist for his team's final goal, which was scored by Dani Alves. This goal was Verratti's first of the 2018–19 season for PSG, and also his first goal ever in the competition.

==== 2019–2020: Domestic treble and European final ====
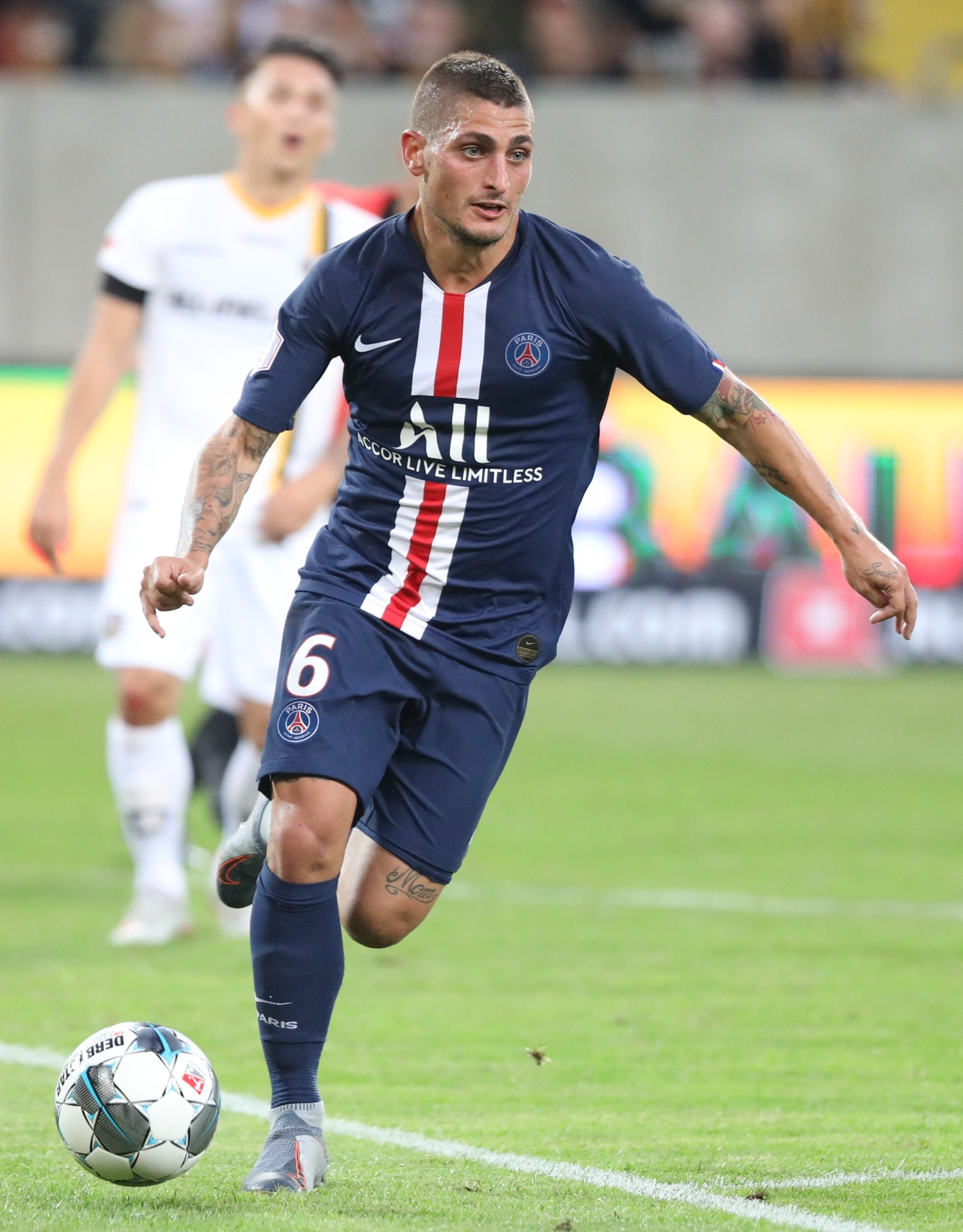
Verratti playing for Paris Saint-Germain in 2019

Following PSG's 2–1 victory over Rennes in the 2019 Trophée des Champions on 3 August, Verratti became the player with the most titles with the club, with 22 trophies in total (six Ligue 1 titles, four Coupe de France titles, five Coupe de la Ligue titles, and seven Trophée des Champions titles). In October, he signed a three–year contract extension with the club, which would tie him to PSG until June 2024. On 12 January 2020, Verratti made his 300th appearance for PSG in a 3–3 home draw against Monaco in Ligue 1. On 18 February, he became the club's all-time appearance holder in the Champions League, when he made his 58th appearance in the competition in a 2–1 away loss in the first leg of their round of 16 draw against Borussia Dortmund, overtaking the previous record holder Paul Le Guen at 57.

In April, PSG were assigned the 2019–20 Ligue 1 title after the season was ended prematurely due to the outbreak of the COVID-19 pandemic; at the time of the League's suspension, PSG were in first place, with a twelve–point lead over second–placed Marseille. This was Verratti's record seventh Ligue 1 title with the club, which saw him equal the all–time individual record of most Ligue 1 title victories, along with his club teammate Thiago Silva, which was jointly held by Hervé Revelli and Jean-Michel Larqué of Saint-Étienne, as well as Grégory Coupet, Juninho and Sidney Govou of Lyon. PSG went on to win a domestic treble, but lost out in the Champions League final 1–0 to Bayern Munich on 23 August; Verratti made a substitute appearance during the match.

==== 2020–2023: Most Ligue 1 titles won and departure ====
In the 2020–21 season with Paris Saint-Germain, Verratti reached the semi-finals of the UEFA Champions League, losing 4–1 on aggregate to Manchester City. In Ligue 1, PSG failed to retain the title as Lille were crowned champions.

On 23 January 2022, Verratti scored two goals in a 4–0 league win over Reims. By doing so, he scored his first league goal since May 2017, and the first brace of his career. After a 1–1 draw against Lens on 23 April, PSG won Ligue 1 for the tenth time in its history, becoming the club with the highest number of championship titles in France, tied with Saint-Étienne. Verratti on his side won eight Ligue 1 titles with PSG, became the first player to achieve this feat.

On 28 December 2022, it was announced that Verratti had extended his contract with Paris Saint-Germain until 30 June 2026. On 27 May 2023, Verratti won his ninth Ligue 1 title, updating his previous record.

In August 2023, it was reported that Verratti was informed by newly appointed coach Luis Enrique that he would not be part of his plans for the next season. On 6 September, reports stated that he was excluded from the Champions League squad for the 2023–24 season. He eventually left Paris Saint-Germain after 11 years with 416 matches, as the player with the second-most matches at the club, only behind Jean-Marc Pilorget with 435.

=== Al-Arabi ===
On 13 September 2023, Verratti signed a three-year deal with Qatar Stars League club Al-Arabi, for a reported transfer fee of €45m.

=== Al Duhail ===
On 7 June 2025, it was confirmed that Verratti had signed for Al-Arabi's rivals, Al Duhail.

== International career ==
=== Youth ===
==== 2012–13: UEFA European Under-21 Championship ====
Verratti took part with the Italy U-21 side at the 2013 UEFA European Under-21 Championship, where the Azzurrini finished as runner-up to Spain. His performances saw him included in UEFA's all-star squad for the tournament.

=== Senior ===
==== 2012–13: Beginnings ====
The uncapped Verratti was included into Cesare Prandelli's preliminary 32-man Italy squad for UEFA Euro 2012, being one of only two Serie B players (the other being Torino's Angelo Ogbonna) to be part of it. He was subsequently cut from the squad on 28 May 2012.

On 15 August 2012, Verratti debuted for the Italian senior team in a 2–1 friendly loss against England in Bern. He made his first competitive appearance in 2014 FIFA World Cup qualification, appearing as a second-half substitute for Emanuele Giaccherini in a 2–2 draw against Bulgaria on 7 September.

On 6 February 2013, Verratti scored his first international goal in a friendly match against the Netherlands in Amsterdam, an equalizer at the 91st minute that ended in a 1–1 draw.

==== 2014: First FIFA World Cup ====
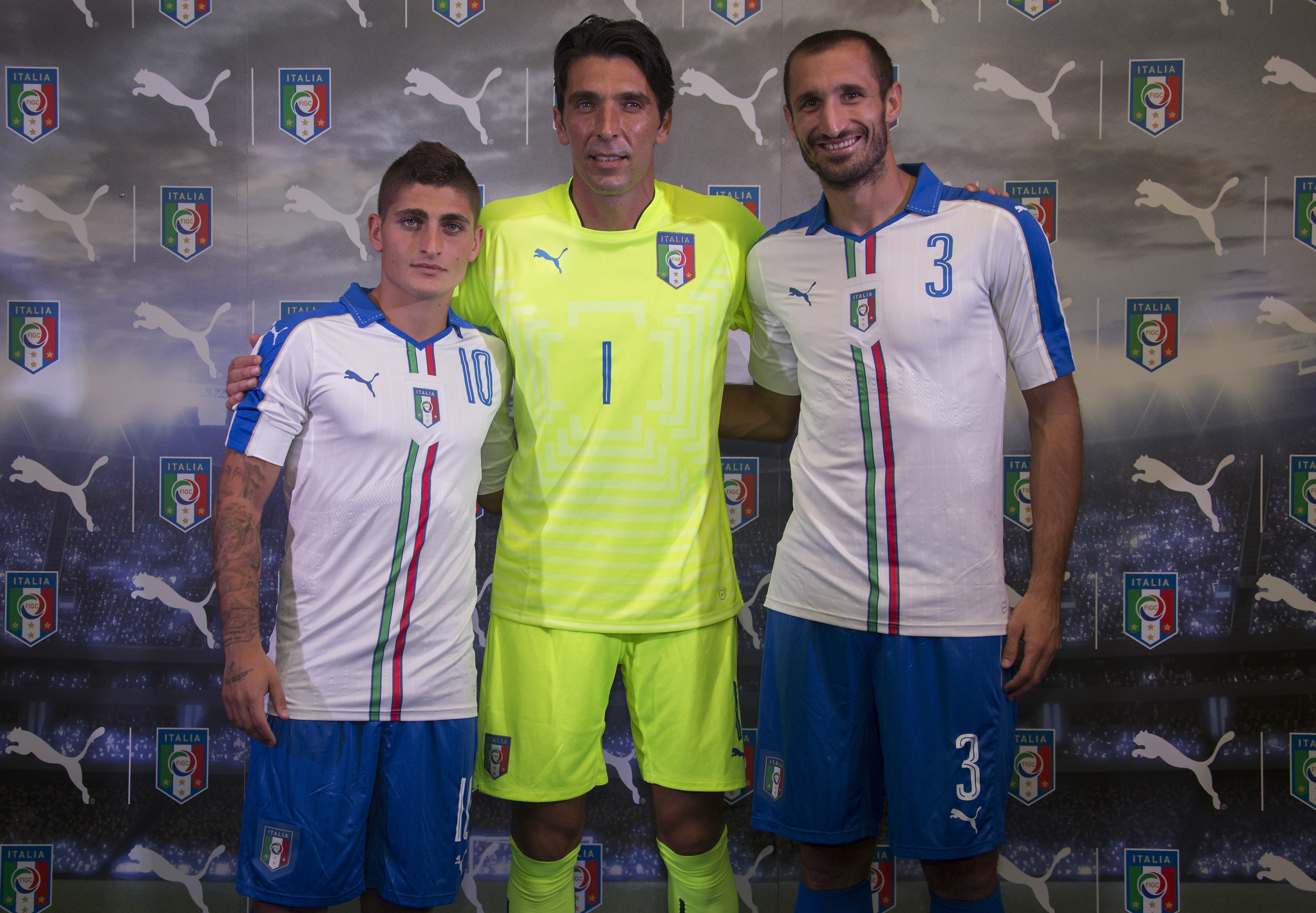
Verratti (left) with Gianluigi Buffon and Giorgio Chiellini in 2015

On 1 June 2014, Verratti was selected in Italy's 23-man squad for the 2014 FIFA World Cup. In Italy's opening match of the tournament, he made his first competitive start for the Azzurri on the left side of a midfield diamond with Juventus players Andrea Pirlo and Claudio Marchisio and Roma vice-captain Daniele De Rossi in his team's opening game of the tournament, a 2–1 victory over England in Manaus. During the match, he was involved in Marchisio's opening goal; after receiving Antonio Candreva's short corner, he passed the ball out wide towards Pirlo, who drew his marker with him. Pirlo let the ball pass in between his legs to Marchisio, leaving him with space to score with a low drive from outside the area. However, Verratti did not appear in Italy's second group match, a 1–0 defeat against Costa Rica; he started in Italy's final group match against Uruguay, which also ended in a 1–0 loss, and as a result, Italy were eliminated in the first round of the tournament.

==== 2016–19: Injury and return ====
On 6 May 2016, it was confirmed Verratti would miss Euro 2016 after a long lasting injury from a sports hernia which would require surgery on 16 May, sidelining him for two months. Upon recovering from his injury, Verratti returned to the team under Italy's new manager Gian Piero Ventura for an international friendly match against France in Bari on 1 September, making a substitute appearance in the Azzurri's 3–1 loss.

On 26 March 2019, Verratti scored his second international goal in a 6–0 home win over Liechtenstein in a UEFA Euro 2020 qualifying match.

==== 2020: First Euro ====
In June 2021, Verratti was included in Italy's squad for UEFA Euro 2020 by manager Roberto Mancini.

After initially missing Italy's first two group matches due to an injury to his right knee that he had sustained in training with Paris Saint-Germain on 8 May, he made his first appearance of the tournament in Italy's final group match against Wales on 20 June, setting-up Matteo Pessina's goal from a free-kick in the team's 1–0 victory in Rome; the result allowed them to top their group. On 2 July, Verratti assisted Italy's opening goal of the match, scored by Nicolò Barella, in a 2–1 win over Belgium in the quarter-finals of the competition.

On 11 July, in the final against England at Wembley Stadium, Verratti was involved in the equalising goal after his header was parried onto the post by keeper Jordan Pickford, allowing Leonardo Bonucci to score from the rebound; following a 1–1 draw after extra-time, Italy prevailed 3–2 in the penalty shootout, to win the tournament for the first time since 1968. With a 93% passing accuracy and three assists throughout the tournament (having completed 401 out of 425 passes attempted), Verratti was named the top performer of Euro 2020 in the FedEx Performance Zone.

== Player profile ==
=== Style of play ===
"He's one of the best midfielders in the world, and plays a little bit in the same way as I tried to do with Barcelona and the national team. He likes having the ball. He also has perfect mastery over long and short passing, he can play the final ball, and he doesn't lose the ball that easily. He's really a very high-class player."

— Xavi on Verratti in 2015

Verratti is a central midfield playmaker. He is known for his confidence and composure on the ball, as well as his ability to retain possession in tight spaces when under pressure, due to his low centre of gravity and resulting balance. He often succeeds in creating chances for teammates with accurate long passes, or control the tempo of his team's play in midfield through precise, short exchanges. Although naturally right-footed, he is capable of playing with either foot. Due to his attributes and playing style, Verratti has been compared to one of his influences, Italy legend Andrea Pirlo, in particular after making the same transition from trequartista to regista that the 2006 FIFA World Cup winner had also made earlier on in his career, although he has also been deployed in a new, more advanced role alongside Pirlo on occasion, as a false-attacking midfielder, in particular under Cesare Prandelli's tenure with the Italy national team. He has also been deployed as a metodista ("centre-half", in Italian football jargon), due to his ability to dictate play in midfield as well as assist his team defensively, or as an offensive minded central or box-to-box midfielder, known as the mezzala in Italian football jargon, due to his ability to carry the ball and push forward.

In addition to his playmaking skills, he is a capable midfielder, who is known for his aggression, defensive skills, and ball-winning abilities, despite his small physique and diminutive stature, which also enables him to be deployed in a holding role.

=== Reception ===
Initially regarded as one of the most talented young players of his generation, Verratti quickly developed into one of the best and most complete playmaking midfielders in the world. In 2017, Spanish midfielder Andrés Iniesta labelled Verratti as his "successor", while in 2021, his Paris Saint-Germain teammate Lionel Messi stated that Verratti was on the same level as the former's past Barcelona teammates Xavi and Iniesta, describing him as a "huge player, one of the best in the world in his position", and as "a phenomenon". In 2022, Neymar said: "I knew Verratti was an excellent player, but I didn't know he was so spectacular. A genius. He is one of the best midfielders I have played with, along with Xavi and Iniesta."

Despite his ability, he has also drawn criticism from some in the sport over his disciplinary record, as well as his tendency to commit an excessive number of fouls, argue with officials, and pick up unnecessary bookings. Verratti has also highlighted his offensive qualities and lack of goalscoring as weaknesses in his game. Moreover, he has also often struggled with injuries throughout his career.

== Personal life ==
=== Family and relationships ===
Verratti was in a relationship since 2009 with a childhood friend, an Italian woman Laura Zazzara, whom he later married and with whom he has two sons, Tommaso and Andrea; the pair separated at the beginning of 2019. On 15 July 2021, four days after Italy's Euro 2020 triumph, Verratti married model Jessica Aidi in Paris.

=== Legal issues ===
On 30 October 2018, Verratti was arrested after being caught drunk driving on the Boulevard Périphérique. He was subsequently fined by Paris Saint-Germain.

== Career statistics ==
=== Club ===
As of match played 18 October 2026

Appearances and goals by club, season and competition
Club	Season	League			National cup (Note: Includes Coppa Italia, Coupe de France, Amir of Qatar Cup)		League cup (Note: Includes Coupe de la Ligue, QSL Cup)		Continental		Other		Total	
Club	Season	Division	Apps	Goals	Apps	Goals	Apps	Goals	Apps	Goals	Apps	Goals	Apps	Goals
Pescara	2008–09	Lega Pro Prima Divisione	7	0	2	0	—		—		—		9	0
Pescara	2009–10	Lega Pro Prima Divisione	8	1	0	0	—		—		—		8	1
Pescara	2010–11	Serie B	28	1	1	0	—		—		—		29	1
Pescara	2011–12	Serie B	31	0	1	0	—		—		—		32	0
Pescara	Total		74	2	4	0	—		—		—		78	2
Paris Saint-Germain	2012–13	Ligue 1	27	0	3	0	0	0	9 (Note: Appearances in UEFA Champions League)	0	—		39	0
Paris Saint-Germain	2013–14	Ligue 1	29	0	1	0	4	0	8	0	1 (Note: Appearance in Trophée des Champions)	0	43	0
Paris Saint-Germain	2014–15	Ligue 1	32	2	6	0	3	0	7	1	1	0	49	3
Paris Saint-Germain	2015–16	Ligue 1	18	0	1	0	3	0	5	0	1	0	28	0
Paris Saint-Germain	2016–17	Ligue 1	28	3	3	0	4	0	7	0	1	0	43	3
Paris Saint-Germain	2017–18	Ligue 1	22	0	3	0	4	0	8	2	1	0	38	2
Paris Saint-Germain	2018–19	Ligue 1	26	0	3	1	1	0	7	0	1	0	38	1
Paris Saint-Germain	2019–20	Ligue 1	20	0	3	0	4	0	9	0	1	0	37	0
Paris Saint-Germain	2020–21	Ligue 1	21	0	2	0	—		7	0	1	0	31	0
Paris Saint-Germain	2021–22	Ligue 1	24	2	3	0	—		5	0	0	0	32	2
Paris Saint-Germain	2022–23	Ligue 1	29	0	1	0	—		7	0	1	0	37	0
Paris Saint-Germain	Total		276	7	29	1	23	0	79	3	9	0	416	11
Al-Arabi	2023–24	Qatar Stars League	17	0	2	0	2	0	—		1 (Note: Appearance in UAE–Qatar Super Cup)	0	22	0
Al-Arabi	2024–25	Qatar Stars League	16	4	0	0	3	0	—		2 (Note: Appearances in GFF Gulf Club Champions League)	1	21	5
Al-Arabi	Total		33	4	2	0	5	0	—		3	1	43	5
Al Duhail	2025–26	Qatar Stars League	10	1	0	0	1	0	5 (Note: Appearances in AFC Champions League Elite)	0	1 (Note: Appearance in UAE–Qatar Challenge Shield)	0	17	1
Al Duhail	2026–27	Qatar Stars League	4	0	0	0	0	0	—		0	0	4	0
Al Duhail	Total		14	1	0	0	1	0	5	0	1	0	21	1
Career total			397	14	35	1	29	0	84	3	13	1	558	19

=== International ===
Appearances and goals by national team and year
National team	Year	Apps	Goals
Italy	2012	2	0
Italy	2013	2	1
Italy	2014	6	0
Italy	2015	5	0
Italy	2016	4	0
Italy	2017	5	0
Italy	2018	5	0
Italy	2019	7	2
Italy	2020	2	0
Italy	2021	10	0
Italy	2022	3	0
Italy	2023	4	0
Total		55	3

Scores and results list Italy's goal tally first, score column indicates score after each Verratti goal.

List of international goals scored by Marco Verratti
No.	Date	Venue	Cap	Opponent	Score	Result	Competition
1	6 February 2013	Amsterdam Arena, Amsterdam, Netherlands	3	Netherlands	1–1	1–1	Friendly
2	26 March 2019	Stadio Ennio Tardini, Parma, Italy	31	Liechtenstein	2–0	6–0	UEFA Euro 2020 qualification
3	11 June 2019	Juventus Stadium, Turin, Italy	33	Bosnia and Herzegovina	2–1	2–1	UEFA Euro 2020 qualification

== Honours ==
Pescara

- Serie B: 2011–12

Paris Saint-Germain

- Ligue 1: 2012–13, 2013–14, 2014–15, 2015–16, 2017–18, 2018–19, 2019–20, 2021–22, 2022–23
- Coupe de France: 2014–15, 2015–16, 2016–17, 2017–18, 2019–20, 2020–21; runner-up: 2018–19
- Coupe de la Ligue: 2013–14, 2014–15, 2015–16, 2016–17, 2017–18, 2019–20
- Trophée des Champions: 2013, 2014, 2015, 2016, 2017, 2018, 2019, 2020, 2022
- UEFA Champions League runner-up: 2019–20

Italy

- UEFA European Championship: 2020
- UEFA Nations League third place: 2020–21, 2022–23

Individual

- Bravo Award: 2012
- Serie B Footballer of the Year: 2012
- UEFA U-21 Championship Team of the Tournament: 2013
- UNFP Ligue 1 Team of the Year: 2012–13, 2013–14, 2014–15, 2015–16, 2016–17, 2017–18, 2018–19
- UNFP Ligue 1 Player of the Month: September 2013, February 2017
- UNFP Ligue 1 Young Player of the Year: 2013–14
- UNFP Ligue 1 Foreign Player of the Year: 2014–15
- L'Équipe World Team: 2015
- Pallone Azzurro: 2015
- Qatar Stars League Team of the Year: 2023–24

Orders

- 5th Class / Knight: Cavaliere Ordine al Merito della Repubblica Italiana: 2021

== See also ==
- List of Paris Saint-Germain FC players
