= 2014–15 En Avant de Guingamp season =

Guingamp
2014–15 season
- Chairman: Bertrand Desplat
- Manager: Jocelyn Gourvennec
- Stadium: Stade du Roudourou
- Ligue 1: 10th
- Coupe de France: Semi-finals
- Coupe de la Ligue: Quarter-finals
- Trophée des Champions: Runners-up
- UEFA Europa League: Round of 32
- Top goalscorer: League: Claudio Beauvue (17); All: Claudio Beauvue (27)
- Highest home attendance: 17,636 vs Paris Saint-Germain (14 December 2014)
- Lowest home attendance: 5,519 vs Fiorentina (19 February 2015)
Home colours	Away colours	Third colours

The 2014–15 En Avant de Guingamp season is the 103rd professional season of the club since its creation in 1912.

== Players ==
=== First team squad ===
French teams are limited to four players without EU citizenship. Hence, the squad list includes only the principal nationality of each player; several non-European players on the squad have dual citizenship with an EU country. Also, players from the ACP countries—countries in Africa, the Caribbean, and the Pacific that are signatories to the Cotonou Agreement—are not counted against non-EU quotas due to the Kolpak ruling.

Note: Flags indicate national team as defined under FIFA eligibility rules; some limited exceptions apply. Players may hold more than one non-FIFA nationality.

No.	Pos.	Nation	Player
1	GK	DEN	Jonas Lössl
2	DF	DEN	Lars Jacobsen
3	DF	CIV	Benjamin Angoua
4	DF	GUI	Baissama Sankoh
5	MF	SEN	Moustapha Diallo
6	DF	FRA	Maxime Baca
7	DF	FRA	Dorian Lévêque
8	FW	DEN	Ronnie Schwartz
9	MF	FRA	Yannis Salibur
10	MF	FRA	Younousse Sankharé
12	MF	GLP	Claudio Beauvue
13	FW	FRA	Christophe Mandanne
14	FW	CGO	Ladislas Douniama

No.	Pos.	Nation	Player
15	DF	FRA	Jérémy Sorbon
16	GK	FRA	Hugo Guichard
17	FW	MAR	Rachid Alioui
18	MF	FRA	Lionel Mathis (captain)
20	MF	FRA	Laurent Dos Santos
21	MF	FRA	Sylvain Marveaux (on loan from Newcastle United)
22	MF	FRA	Julien Cardy
23	MF	FRA	Jérémy Pied (on loan from Nice)
24	MF	MLI	Sambou Yatabaré (on loan from Olympiacos)
25	DF	FRA	Reynald Lemaître
26	MF	FRA	Thibault Giresse
29	DF	FRA	Christophe Kerbrat
30	GK	MLI	Mamadou Samassa

=== On loan ===
Note: Flags indicate national team as defined under FIFA eligibility rules; some limited exceptions apply. Players may hold more than one non-FIFA nationality.

No.	Pos.	Nation	Player
—	DF	FRA	Vital N'Simba (on loan to Luçon)
—	FW	FRA	Julien Bègue (on loan to Boulogne)

No.	Pos.	Nation	Player
—	FW	MLI	Mana Dembélé (on loan to Nancy)

== Competitions ==
=== Trophée des Champions ===
2 August 2014	Paris Saint-Germain	2–0	Guingamp	Beijing, China
20:00 (CST)	Ibrahimović 8', 20' (pen.)	Report	Kerbrat (yellow card) 47'	Stadium: Workers Stadium; Attendance: 39,752; Referee: Clément Turpin (France)

=== Ligue 1 ===
==== League table ====
Pos	Team	Pld	W	D	L	GF	GA	GD	Pts
8	Lille	38	16	8	14	43	42	+1	56
9	Rennes	38	13	11	14	35	42	−7	50
10	Guingamp	38	15	4	19	41	55	−14	49
11	Nice	38	13	9	16	44	53	−9	48
12	Bastia	38	12	11	15	37	46	−9	47

Source: Ligue 1
Rules for classification: 1) points; 2) goal difference; 3) number of goals scored

==== Results summary ====
Overall								Home						Away					
Pld	W	D	L	GF	GA	GD	Pts	W	D	L	GF	GA	GD	W	D	L	GF	GA	GD
38	15	4	19	41	55	−14	49	9	1	9	23	25	−2	6	3	10	18	30	−12

Last updated: 6 June 2015.
Source: Competitive matches

==== Results by round ====
Round	1	2	3	4	5	6	7	8	9	10	11	12	13	14	15	16	17	18	19	20	21	22	23	24	25	26	27	28	29	30	31	32	33	34	35	36	37	38
Ground	H	A	H	A	H	A	H	A	H	A	H	H	A	H	A	H	A	H	A	H	A	H	A	H	A	H	A	H	A	A	H	A	H	A	H	A	H	A
Result	L	W	L	L	W	L	L	L	L	W	L	W	L	L	L	W	W	W	D	W	L	W	D	W	W	L	L	L	W	D	L	L	D	W	W	L	W	L
Position	19	13	16	18	16	19	19	20	20	19	20	16	18	19	20	17	16	13	13	13	13	12	11	10	8	8	11	13	10	10	11	12	12	11	10	11	10	10

Source: Ligue1
A = Away; H = Home; W = Win; D = Draw; L = Loss

==== Matches ====
Win Draw Loss

9 August 2014 1	Guingamp	0–2	Saint-Étienne	Guingamp
21:00 CEST (UTC+02:00)		Report	Erdinç 39' (pen.), 90+2'; Lemoine (yellow card) 55'; Cohade (yellow card) 74'; Gradel (yellow card) 82'; Brison (yellow card) 84'	Stadium: Stade du Roudourou; Attendance: 16,852; Referee: Mikael Lesage

16 August 2014 2	Lens	0–1	Guingamp	Amiens
20:00 CEST (UTC+02:00)	Kantari (yellow card) 35'; Valdivia (yellow card) 50'; Chavarria (yellow card) 59'; Lemoigne (yellow card) 79'	Report	Dos Santos (yellow card) 62'; Douniama 90+3'	Stadium: Stade de la Licorne; Attendance: 9,512; Referee: Sébastien Moreira

23 August 2014 3	Guingamp	0–1	Marseille	Guingamp
17:00 CEST (UTC+02:00)	Sorbon (yellow card) 90+2'	Report	Payet (yellow card) 29'; Gignac 46', (yellow card) 70'; Batshuayi (yellow card) 71'	Stadium: Stade du Roudourou; Attendance: 16,901; Referee: Benoît Millot

30 August 2014 4	Lorient	4–0	Guingamp	Lorient
20:00 CEST (UTC+02:00)	Ayew (yellow card) 34', (goal) 82'; Jeannot 58'; Abdullah (yellow card) 61'; Lavigne 80', 90+3'	Report	Diallo (yellow card) 66'	Stadium: Stade du Moustoir; Attendance: 13,025; Referee: Sébastien Desiage

14 September 2014 5	Guingamp	2–1	Bordeaux	Guingamp
17:00 CEST (UTC+02:00)	Diallo 26'; Mandanne 34' (pen.)	Report	Touré (yellow card) 65'; Contento (yellow card) 74'; Diabaté 83'	Stadium: Stade du Roudourou; Attendance: 12,912; Referee: Olivier Thual

21 September 2014 6	Monaco	1–0	Guingamp	Monaco
17:00 CEST (UTC+02:00)	Dirar 38'; Kurzawa (yellow card) 59'; Moutinho (yellow card) 78'; Toulalan (yellow card) 87'	Report	Angoua (yellow card) 37'; Lemaître (yellow card) 53'	Stadium: Stade Louis II; Attendance: 6,351; Referee: Mikaël Lesage

24 September 2014 7	Guingamp	0–1	Metz	Guingamp
19:00 CEST (UTC+02:00)	Diallo (yellow card) 90+2'	Report	Bussmann 24'; N'Daw (yellow card) 37'; Ngbakoto (yellow card) 61' (yellow-red card) 89'; Métanire (yellow card) 86'	Stadium: Stade du Roudourou; Attendance: 12,712; Referee: Stéphane Lannoy

27 September 2014 8	Montpellier	2–1	Guingamp	Montpellier
20:00 CEST (UTC+02:00)	Camara 48'; Montaño 89'	Report	Yatabaré (yellow card) 8'; Diallo (yellow card) 53'; Beauvue 83'; Samassa (red card) 89'; Sankharé (yellow card) 90'	Stadium: Stade de la Mosson; Attendance: 10,282; Referee: Philippe Kalt

5 October 2014 9	Guingamp	0–1	Nantes	Guingamp
17:00 CEST (UTC+02:00)	Yatabaré (yellow card) 90+3'	Report	Nkoudou (yellow card) 17', (goal) 33'; Djilobodji (yellow card) 22'; Hansen (yellow card) 44'	Stadium: Stade du Roudourou; Attendance: 14,744; Referee: Saïd Ennjimi

18 October 2014 10	Lille	1–2	Guingamp	Villeneuve-d'Ascq
20:00 CEST (UTC+02:00)	Balmont (yellow card) 13'; Corchia (yellow card) 21'; Mavuba 78'; Sidibé (yellow card) 89'	Report	Sankharé (yellow card) 15'; Beauvue 45+1'; Schwartz 57', (yellow card) 61'; Angoua (red card) 86'	Stadium: Stade Pierre-Mauroy; Attendance: 33,926; Referee: Fredy Fautrel

26 October 2014 11	Guingamp	2–7	Nice	Guingamp
17:00 CEST (UTC+02:00)	Beauvue 8'; Schwartz 70'	Report	Carlos Eduardo 12', 26', 43', 50', 64'; Palun (yellow card) 16'; Pléa 45+1'; Bauthéac 72'	Stadium: Stade du Roudourou; Attendance: 14,664; Referee: Clément Turpin

1 November 2014 12	Guingamp	1–0	Bastia	Guingamp
20:00 CET (UTC+01:00)	Yatabaré 32', (yellow card) 45'; Mathis (yellow card) 40'	Report	Cahuzac (yellow card) 57'	Stadium: Stade du Roudourou; Attendance: 14,293; Referee: Wilfried Bien

9 November 2014 13	Lyon	3–1	Guingamp	Lyon
14:00 CET (UTC+01:00)	Lacazette 7'; Fekir 20', 87'; Malbranque (yellow card) 37'	Report	Lopes 45+1' (o.g.); Pied (yellow card) 49'	Stadium: Stade de Gerland; Attendance: 36,461; Referee: Benoît Millot

22 November 2014 14	Guingamp	0–1	Rennes	Guingamp
20:00 CET (UTC+01:00)	Angoua (yellow card) 45'; Diallo (yellow card) 90+1'	Report	Ntep 36'; Mexer (yellow card) 52'; Danzé (yellow card) 55'; Fernandes (yellow card) 59'	Stadium: Stade du Roudourou; Attendance: 16,501; Referee: Bartolomeu Varela

30 November 2014 15	Evian	2–0	Guingamp	Annecy
17:00 CET (UTC+01:00)	Mongongu (yellow card) 4'; Wass 59'; Bille Nielsen 81'	Report	Sankoh (yellow card) 12'	Stadium: Parc des Sports; Attendance: 10,665; Referee: Fredy Fautrel

3 December 2014 16	Guingamp	5–1	Caen	Guingamp
19:00 CET (UTC+01:00)	Mandanne 4', 62'; Diallo (yellow card) 13'; Giresse 20'; Yatabaré (yellow card) 36'; Beauvue 61' (pen.), 78'	Report	Yahia 17'; Nangis (yellow card) 44'; Pierre (red card) 60'	Stadium: Stade du Roudourou; Attendance: 13,423; Referee: Amaury Delerue

7 December 2014 17	Reims	2–3	Guingamp	Reims
17:00 CET (UTC+01:00)	Charbonnier 6'; Oniangue (yellow card) 45+1', (goal) 68'; Tacalfred (yellow card) 73'	Report	Jacobsen 33'; Angoua (yellow card) 35'; Mandanne 47'; Beauvue 79'; Lévêque (yellow card) 85'; Sankharé (yellow card) 87'	Stadium: Stade Auguste Delaune; Attendance: 11,255; Referee: Frank Schneider

14 December 2014 18	Guingamp	1–0	Paris Saint-Germain	Guingamp
17:00 CET (UTC+01:00)	Pied 11'	Report	Matuidi (yellow card) 61'; Lavezzi (yellow card) 62'; Cabaye (yellow card) 82'	Stadium: Stade du Roudourou; Attendance: 17,636; Referee: Antony Gautier

20 December 2014 19	Toulouse	1–1	Guingamp	Toulouse
20:00 CET (UTC+01:00)	Doumbia 25'; Sirieix (yellow card) 43'; Moubandje (yellow card) 50'	Report	Giresse 8'	Stadium: Stadium Municipal; Attendance: 14,190; Referee: Saïd Ennjimi

10 January 2015 20	Guingamp	2–0	Lens	Guingamp
20:00 CET (UTC+01:00)	Mandanne 17'; Sankharé (yellow card) 61'; Beauvue 76' (pen.)	Report	El Jadeyaoui (yellow card) 49'; Valdivia (yellow card) 71'; Sylla (yellow card) 85'	Stadium: Stade du Roudourou; Attendance: 13,520; Referee: Clément Turpin

18 January 2015 21	Marseille	2–1	Guingamp	Marseille
21:00 CET (UTC+01:00)	Dja Djédjé (yellow card) 22'; Morel (yellow card) 72'; Lemina 85'; Gignac 89'; Fanni (red card) 90'	Report	Angoua (yellow card) 17'; Beauvue 90+1' (pen.)	Stadium: Stade Vélodrome; Attendance: 42,601; Referee: Wilfried Bien

24 January 2015 22	Guingamp	3–2	Lorient	Guingamp
20:00 CET (UTC+01:00)	Beauvue 19', 76' (pen.); Diallo (yellow card) 28'; Sankharé (yellow card) 28' (yellow-red card) 80'; Pied (yellow card) 47'; Mandanne 69'	Report	Lautoa (yellow card) 55'; Jeannot 72' (pen.); Lévêque 90+2' (o.g.)	Stadium: Stade du Roudourou; Attendance: 13,764; Referee: Tony Chapron

1 February 2015 23	Bordeaux	1–1	Guingamp	Bordeaux
17:00 CET (UTC+01:00)	Chantôme (yellow card) 33'; Poundjé 56', (yellow card) 78'; Plašil (red card) 79'	Report	Beauvue 28', (yellow card) 76'; Coco (yellow card) 35'; Lévêque (yellow card) 71'; Mathis (yellow card) 82'	Stadium: Stade Chaban-Delmas; Attendance: 16,104; Referee: Sébastien Desiage

8 February 2015 24	Guingamp	1–0	Monaco	Guingamp
14:00 CET (UTC+01:00)	Diallo (red card) 22'; Jacobsen (yellow card) 29'; Lévêque 51'; Yatabaré (yellow card) 90+1'	Report	Carrasco (yellow card) 31'; Wallace (yellow card) 36'	Stadium: Stade du Roudourou; Attendance: 13,532; Referee: Ruddy Buquet

15 February 2015 25	Metz	0–2	Guingamp	Metz
17:00 CET (UTC+01:00)	N'Daw (yellow card) 58'; Métanire (yellow card) 81'; Maïga (yellow card) 89'	Report	Mandanne 26'; Pied 39'; Yatabaré (yellow card) 74'	Stadium: Stade Saint-Symphorien; Attendance: 20,252; Referee: Benoît Millot

22 February 2015 26	Guingamp	0–2	Montpellier	Guingamp
14:00 CET (UTC+01:00)		Report	Sanson 2'; Bérigaud 55'; Tiéné (yellow card) 87'	Stadium: Stade du Roudourou; Attendance: 13,942; Referee: Alexandre Castro

1 March 2015 27	Nantes	1–0	Guingamp	Nantes
14:00 CET (UTC+01:00)	Deaux (yellow card) 28'; Gapké (yellow card) 30'; Djilobodji (yellow card) 32'; Vizcarrondo (yellow card) 40' (yellow-red card) 90'; Veretout (yellow card) 60'; Bammou 68'	Report	Pied (yellow card) 28'; Jacobsen (yellow card) 43'; Coco (yellow card) 53'; Sankharé (yellow card) 79'	Stadium: Stade de la Beaujoire; Attendance: 24,118; Referee: Amaury Delerue

8 March 2015 28	Guingamp	0–1	Lille	Guingamp
17:00 CET (UTC+01:00)	Pied (yellow card) 62'; Yatabaré (yellow card) 66'	Report	Roux 51'; Gueye (yellow card) 68'; Enyeama (yellow card) 88'; Sidibé (yellow card) 89'	Stadium: Stade du Roudourou; Attendance: 13,639; Referee: Benoît Bastien

13 March 2015 29	Nice	1–2	Guingamp	Nice
20:30 CET (UTC+01:00)	Carlos Eduardo (yellow card) 13'; Bauthéac (yellow card) 43', (goal) 57'	Report	Mandanne 49', 61', (yellow card) 67'; Mathis (yellow card) 55'	Stadium: Allianz Riviera; Referee: Benoît Millot

21 March 2015 30	Bastia	0–0	Guingamp	Fos-sur-Mer
20:00 CET (UTC+01:00)	Marange (yellow card) 30'	Report	Sankharé (yellow card) 14'	Stadium: Stade Parsemain; Referee: Stéphane Lannoy

4 April 2015 31	Guingamp	1–3	Lyon	Guingamp
17:00 CEST (UTC+02:00)	Pied (yellow card) 42'; Kerbrat (red card) 45'; Beauvue 80'	Report	Fekir 26'; Rose (yellow card) 35'; Lacazette 39' (pen.), (yellow card) 40'; N'Jie 61'	Stadium: Stade du Roudourou; Attendance: 17,381; Referee: Clément Turpin

12 April 2015 32	Rennes	1–0	Guingamp	Rennes
17:00 CEST (UTC+02:00)	Pedro Henrique (yellow card) 36'; Doucouré (yellow card) 78'; Toivonen 80'; Fernandes (yellow card) 82'	Report	Giresse (yellow card) 15'; Diallo (yellow card) 47'; Yatabaré (red card) 75'; Mathis (yellow card) 78'	Stadium: Stade de la Route de Lorient; Attendance: 27,193; Referee: Antony Gautier

18 April 2015 33	Guingamp	1–1	Evian	Guingamp
20:00 CEST (UTC+02:00)	Beauvue 44'; Mathis (yellow card) 52'	Report	Blandi (yellow card) 31', (goal) 50'; Sabaly (yellow card) 74'	Stadium: Stade du Roudourou; Attendance: 13,788; Referee: Ruddy Buquet

25 April 2015 34	Caen	0–2	Guingamp	Caen
20:00 CEST (UTC+02:00)	Kanté (yellow card) 45'; Sala (yellow card) 61'; Yahia (yellow card) 68'	Report	Lemaître (yellow card) 10'; Pied (yellow card) 29'; Beauvue 49'; Marveaux 66'; Angoua (yellow card) 87'	Stadium: Stade Michel d'Ornano; Attendance: 18,807; Referee: Frank Schneider

2 May 2015 35	Guingamp	2–0	Reims	Guingamp
20:00 CEST (UTC+02:00)	Beauvue 62' (pen.); Cardy (yellow card) 87'; Mandanne 90+4'	Report	Placide (yellow card) 61'	Stadium: Stade du Roudourou; Attendance: 14,662; Referee: Alexandre Castro

8 May 2015 36	Paris Saint-Germain	6–0	Guingamp	Paris
20:30 CEST (UTC+02:00)	Cavani 2', 52', 70'; Ibrahimović 18', 90' (pen.), (yellow card) 30'; Maxwell 56'	Report	Sankharé (yellow card) 54'; Lemaître (yellow card) 90+2'	Stadium: Parc des Princes; Attendance: 46,683; Referee: Sébastien Moreira

16 May 2015 37	Guingamp	2–1	Toulouse	Guingamp
21:00 CEST (UTC+02:00)	Mandanne 5'; Beauvue 49'; Kerbrat (red card) 60'; Diallo (yellow card) 86'	Report	Ben Yedder 26' (pen.); Trejo (yellow card) 82'	Stadium: Stade du Roudourou; Attendance: 17,239; Referee: Benoît Bastien

23 May 2015 38	Saint-Étienne	2–1	Guingamp	Saint-Étienne
21:00 CEST (UTC+02:00)	Gradel 36', 49'; Brison (yellow card) 44'; Sall (yellow card) 61'	Report	Jacobsen (yellow card) 51'; Beauvue 61' (pen.)	Stadium: Stade Geoffroy-Guichard; Attendance: 39,147; Referee: Fredy Fautrel

=== Coupe de la Ligue ===
17 December 2014 Round of 16	Arles-Avignon	0–2	Guingamp	Avignon
21:00 CET (UTC+01:00)	Gigot (yellow card) 22'; Savanier (yellow card) 90+1'	Report	Mandanne 13'; Beauvue 68'	Stadium: Parc des Sports; Attendance: 1,676; Referee: Wilfried Bien

14 January 2015 Quarter-finals	Monaco	2–0	Guingamp	Monaco
21:00 CET	Berbatov 8', (yellow card) 70'; Bakayoko (yellow card) 43'; Martial 90+4'	Report	Mandanne (red card) 36'; Sankharé (yellow card) 82'	Stadium: Stade Louis II; Attendance: 4,785; Referee: Nicolas Rainville

=== Coupe de France ===
4 January 2015 Round of 64	Dinan-Léhon	0–3	Guingamp	Guingamp
14:15 CET (UTC+01:00)	Herve (yellow card) 26'; Huot (yellow card) 78'; El Guennouni (yellow card) 89'	Report	Diallo (yellow card) 45'; Beauvue 51', 64'; Pied 81'	Stadium: Stade du Roudourou; Attendance: 8,885; Referee: Bartolomeu Varela

21 January 2015 Round of 32	Guingamp	2–0	Châteauroux	Guingamp
19:00 CET (UTC+01:00)	Alioui (yellow card) 55'; Beauvue 60'; Giresse 90+4' (pen.)	Report	Plessis (yellow card) 24'; Bain (yellow card) 36'; Tait (yellow card) 90+3'	Stadium: Stade du Roudourou; Attendance: 6,628; Referee: Fredy Fautrel

11 February 2015 Round of 16	Yzeure	1–3 (a.e.t.)	Guingamp	Yzeure
15:00 CET (UTC+01:00)	Dady Ngoye (yellow card) 12'; Hardouin (yellow card) 60'; El-Hajri 62'; Sauvadet (yellow card) 67'; Sohier (yellow card) 71'; Colard (yellow card) 77'	Report	Yatabaré (yellow card) 24'; Angoua (yellow card) 61'; Mandanne 90+3', 97'; Baca (yellow card) 98'; Pied 100'	Stadium: Stade de Bellevue; Attendance: 2,250; Referee: Wilfried Bien

5 March 2015 Quarter-finals	Concarneau	1–2	Guingamp	Lorient
21:00 CET (UTC+01:00)	Gourmelon 22', (yellow card) 23'; Jannez (yellow card) 55'	1, 2	Mandanne 3'; Kerbrat (yellow card) 62'; Beauvue 90+2'	Stadium: Stade du Moustoir; Attendance: 18,000; Referee: Lionel Jaffredo

7 April 2015 Semi-finals	Auxerre	1–0	Guingamp	Auxerre
21:00 CEST (UTC+02:00)	Sammaritano 15'; Mulumba (yellow card) 36'; Aït Ben Idir (yellow card) 50' (yellow-red card) 72'; Puygrenier (yellow card) 80'	Report	Mathis (yellow card) 43'; Pied (yellow card) 65'; Jacobsen (yellow card) 89'	Stadium: Stade de l'Abbé Deschamps; Attendance: 18,000; Referee: Benoît Millot

=== UEFA Europa League ===
==== Group stages ====
Pos	Team	Pld	W	D	L	GF	GA	GD	Pts	Qualification	FIO	GUI	PAO	DMI
1	(Italy) Fiorentina	6	4	1	1	11	4	+7	13	Advance to knockout phase	—	3–0	1–1	1–2
2	(France) Guingamp	6	3	1	2	7	6	+1	10	Advance to knockout phase	1–2	—	2–0	2–0
3	(Greece) PAOK	6	2	1	3	10	7	+3	7		0–1	1–2	—	6–1
4	(Belarus) Dinamo Minsk	6	1	1	4	3	14	−11	4		0–3	0–0	0–2	—

Source: Soccerway
Rules for classification: Group stage tiebreakers

18 September 2014 1	Fiorentina (Italy)	3–0	(France) Guingamp	Florence, Italy
21:05	Vargas 34'; Kurtić (yellow card) 54'; Cuadrado 67'; Basanta (yellow card) 79'; Bernardeschi 88'	Report	Diallo (yellow card) 24' (yellow-red card) 38'; Marveaux (yellow card) 39'; Beauveu (yellow card) 81'	Stadium: Stadio Artemio Franchi; Attendance: 32,000; Referee: Harald Lechner (Austria)

2 October 2014 2	Guingamp (France)	2–0	(Greece) PAOK	Guingamp, France
19:00	Marveaux 47', 50'; Schwartz (yellow card) 70'	Report		Stadium: Stade du Roudourou; Attendance: 8,783; Referee: Gediminas Mažeika (Lithuania)

23 October 2014 3	Dinamo Minsk (Belarus)	0–0	(France) Guingamp	Barysaw, Belarus
19:00	Stasevich (yellow card) 19'; Kantsavy (yellow card) 21'	Report	Yatabaré (yellow card) 23'; Mathis (yellow card) 72'	Stadium: Borisov Arena; Attendance: 5,000; Referee: Aleksandar Stavrev (Macedonia)

6 November 2014 4	Guingamp (France)	2–0	(Belarus) Dinamo Minsk	Guingamp, France
21:05	Beauvue 44'; Diallo (yellow card) 70'; Mandanne 86'; Pied (yellow card) 90'	Report	Veratilo (yellow card) 23'; Molosh (yellow card) 61'	Stadium: Stade du Roudourou; Attendance: 17,000; Referee: Artyom Kuchin (Kazakhstan)

27 November 2014 5	Guingamp (France)	1–2	(Italy) Fiorentina	Guingamp, France
19:00	Beauvue 45' (pen.)	Report	Marin 6'; Babacar 13', (yellow card) 57'; Aquilani (yellow card) 41'; Basanta (red card) 44'; Savić (yellow card) 90+3'	Stadium: Stade du Roudourou; Attendance: 5,519; Referee: Aleksei Eskov (Russia)

11 December 2014 6	PAOK (Greece)	1–2	(France) Guingamp	Thessaloniki, Greece
21:05	Athanasiadis (yellow card) 6', (goal) 22' (pen.); Tzavellas (yellow card) 38'; Skondras (yellow card) 52'	Report	Beauvue 7', 83'; Lévêque (yellow card) 51'	Stadium: Toumba Stadium; Attendance: 12,101; Referee: Kevin Blom (Netherlands)

==== Round of 32 ====
19 February 2015 First Leg	Guingamp (France)	2–1	(Ukraine) Dynamo Kyiv	Guingamp, France
21:05	Mandanne (yellow card) 16'; Sankharé (yellow card) 34'; Lévêque (yellow card) 66'; Beauvue 72'; Diallo 75'	Report	Veloso 19'; Sydorchuk (yellow card) 21'; Yarmolenko (red card) 39'; Belhanda (red card) 45'; Rybalka (yellow card) 45'; Husyev (yellow card) 45+1'; Vida (yellow card) 88'	Stadium: Stade du Roudourou; Attendance: 16,191; Referee: Slavko Vinčić (Slovenia)

26 February 2015 Second Leg	Dynamo Kyiv (Ukraine)	3–1 (4–3 agg.)	(France) Guingamp	Kyiv, Ukraine
19:00	Rybalka (yellow card) 1'; Teodorczyk 31'; Buyalskyi 46', (yellow card) 47'; Husyev 75' (pen.); Lens (yellow card) 89'	Report	Mathis (yellow card) 8'; Mandanne 68'	Stadium: Olimpiyskiy National Sports Complex; Attendance: 54,308; Referee: Martin Strömbergsson (Sweden)
