= 2014 Trophée des Champions =

French supercup

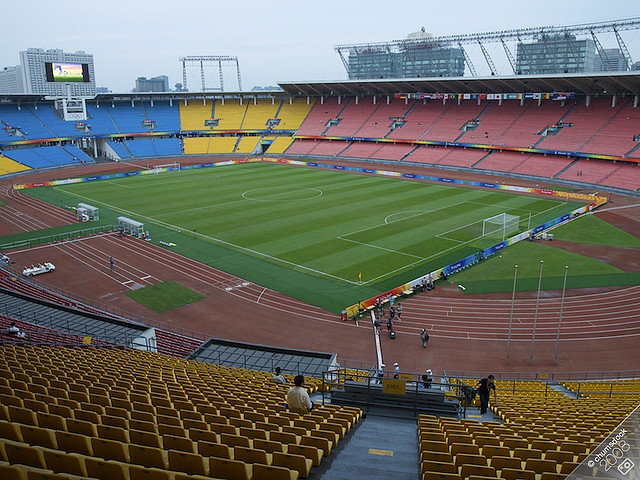
- The Workers' Stadium, in Beijing, hosted the match.
- Event: Trophée des Champions
Paris Saint-Germain	Guingamp
Ligue 1	Coupe de France
2	0
- Date: 2 August 2014
- Venue: Workers' Stadium, Beijing, China
- Man of the Match: Zlatan Ibrahimović
- Referee: Clément Turpin
- Attendance: 39,752

The 2014 Trophée des Champions (English: 2014 Champions' Trophy) was the 19th edition of the French supercup. The match was played at the Workers' Stadium in Beijing, China. This was the sixth consecutive time the competition has taken place on foreign soil, and its first time in Asia.

The match was between Paris Saint-Germain, the winners of the 2013–14 Ligue 1 season, and the 2013–14 Coupe de France winners En Avant Guingamp. Paris Saint-Germain were the defending champions, having defeated Bordeaux in the 2013 edition, which was played in Gabon. They successfully defended their trophy by defeating Guingamp 2–0, their fourth victory in eight editions of the tournament.

== Match ==
=== Summary ===
In the 9th minute, Zlatan Ibrahimović opened the scoring by controlling Javier Pastore's pass with his heel and then volleying the ball. Ten minutes later, Ibrahimović doubled PSG's lead with a penalty after Lars Jacobsen brought down Hervin Ongenda. After 32 minutes, Guingamp had a chance with their own penalty, after Marquinhos fouled Claudio Beauvue, but Mustapha Yatabaré's shot was saved by Salvatore Sirigu.

=== Details ===
2 August 2014
20:00 (CST)

Paris Saint-Germain	2–0	Guingamp
Ibrahimović 8', 20' (pen.)	Report

Workers' Stadium, Beijing
Attendance: 39,752
Referee: Clément Turpin (France)

Paris Saint-Germain	Guingamp

GK	30	(Italy) Salvatore Sirigu
RB	23	(Netherlands) Gregory van der Wiel
CB	6	(France) Zoumana Camara
CB	5	(Brazil) Marquinhos
LB	21	(France) Lucas Digne
DM	14	(Italy) Thiago Motta
CM	24	(Italy) Marco Verratti
CM	27	(Argentina) Javier Pastore	(substituted off) 86'
RW	35	(France) Hervin Ongenda	(substituted off) 61'
CF	10	(Sweden) Zlatan Ibrahimović (c)
LW	28	(France) Jean-Christophe Bahebeck	(substituted off) 71'
Substitutes:
GK	1	(France) Nicolas Douchez
DF	19	(Ivory Coast) Serge Aurier
DF	38	(France) Presnel Kimpembe
MF	7	(Brazil) Lucas	(substituted on) 86'
MF	20	(France) Clément Chantôme	(substituted on) 71'
MF	32	(France) Franck-Yves Bambock
FW	9	(Uruguay) Edinson Cavani	(substituted on) 61'
Manager:
(France) Laurent Blanc

GK	30	(Mali) Mamadou Samassa
RB	2	(Denmark) Lars Jacobsen
CB	29	(France) Christophe Kerbrat	(yellow card) 47'
CB	15	(France) Jérémy Sorbon
LB	6	(France) Maxime Baca
DM	18	(France) Lionel Mathis (c)
CM	22	(France) Julien Cardy		(substituted off) 13'
CM	26	(France) Thibault Giresse
RW	12	(France) Claudio Beauvue
CF	9	(Mali) Mustapha Yatabaré
LW	8	(Denmark) Ronnie Schwartz		(substituted off) 70'
Substitutes:
GK	16	(France) Hugo Guichard
DF	3	(Ivory Coast) Benjamin Angoua
DF	4	(Guinea) Baissama Sankho
MF	20	(France) Laurent Dos Santos
MF	21	(France) Sylvain Marveaux		(substituted on) 69'
FW	13	(France) Christophe Mandanne		(substituted on) 69'
FW	17	(Morocco) Rachid Alioui		(substituted on) 13'	(substituted off) 69'
Manager:
(France) Jocelyn Gourvennec

Man of the Match:
Zlatan Ibrahimović (Paris Saint-Germain)

MATCH OFFICIALS

- Assistant referees:
  - Mickaël Annonier (France)
  - Nicolas Danos (France)
- Fourth official: Bartolomeu Varela (France)

MATCH RULES

- 90 minutes.
- Penalty shoot-out if scores level after 90 minutes.
- Seven named substitutes
- Maximum of six substitutions.

== See also ==
- 2014–15 Ligue 1
- 2014–15 Coupe de France
- 2014–15 En Avant de Guingamp season
- 2014–15 Paris Saint-Germain FC season
