= Sylvain Marveaux =

French footballer (born 1986)

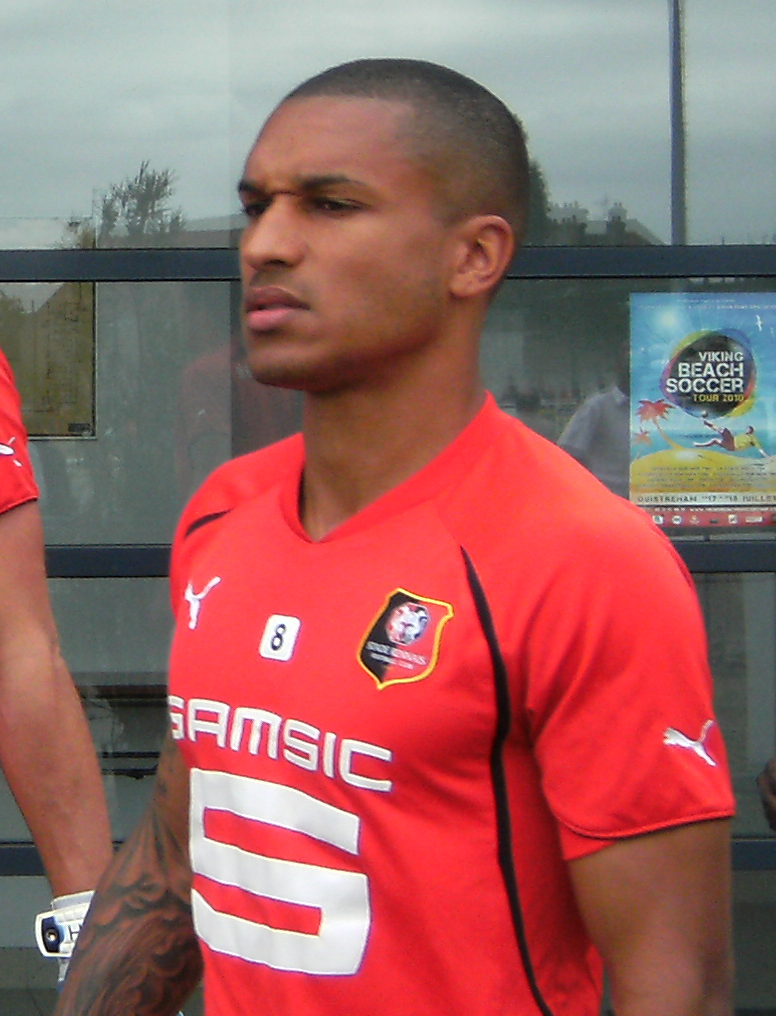
- Marveaux warming up with Rennes in 2010

Personal information
- Date of birth: 15 April 1986 (age 40)
- Place of birth: Vannes, Morbihan, France
- Height: 1.72 m (5 ft 8 in)
- Positions: Midfielder; forward

Youth career
- 1992–1999: Ménimur
- 1999–2001: Vannes
- 2001–2006: Rennes

Senior career*
Years	Team	Apps	(Gls)
2006–2011	Rennes	102	(16)
2011–2016	Newcastle United	38	(1)
2014–2015	→ Guingamp (loan)	24	(1)
2016–2021	Lorient	79	(15)
2019	→ Nancy (loan)	9	(5)
2021	Charlotte Independence	19	(6)
Total		271	(44)

International career
2006–2008	France U21	11	(4)
- * Club domestic league appearances and goals

Sylvain Marveaux (born 15 April 1986) is a French former professional footballer. He played a variety of positions in midfield, but was mostly utilized as a right-sided midfielder or an attacking midfielder or as a forward. He is the younger brother of Joris Marveaux, who currently plays for Gazélec Ajaccio.

== Club career ==
=== Early career ===
Marveaux was born in Vannes, Morbihan, and began his career at local club AS Ménimur at age six. He starred for the club at various youth levels before departing for the biggest club in the city, Vannes OC. In his first year at Vannes, Marveaux was selected to attend the Pôle Espoirs Football de Ploufragan, a smaller regional version of the Clairefontaine academy. While training at Ploufragan during the weekdays, he played at Vannes on the weekends. Marveaux also trained alongside future Rennes teammates Yoann Gourcuff, Virgile Reset and William Stanger while attending Ploufragan.

=== Rennes ===
In 2001, after leaving Ploufragan, Marveaux signed an aspirant (youth) contract with Stade Rennais and joined the club's aspiring youth academy. Marveaux spent four years in the club's academy before earning a call up to the club's Championnat de France amateur team for the 2005–06 season. He was an undisputed starter in the team making 21 appearances and scoring seven goals. Following the season, Marveaux signed his first professional contract agreeing to a three-year deal until June 2009. He was officially promoted to the senior team and assigned the number 26 shirt for the 2006–07 season.

Marveaux made his professional debut on 5 August 2006 in a league match against Lille playing the entire match in a 2–1 defeat. Despite starting his first professional match, he was relegated to appearing as a substitute for the majority of the season by manager Guy Lacombe. Marveaux scored his first professional goal for the team on 14 October after appearing as a first-half substitute in a 3–1 win over Auxerre. Two weeks later, he scored an extra time goal in the Coupe de la Ligue against Lille after appearing as a second-half substitute. Rennes won the match 2–0. On 18 November, Marveaux converted a late equalizing goal in a 1–1 draw against Le Mans. He finished the campaign with 32 total appearances and six goals. Of the 32 appearances, Marveaux only made nine starts.

Marveaux began the 2007–08 season alternating between the bench and the first 11 as the player struggled to adapt to new manager Guy Lacombe. He finished the season with 24 appearances in the league and no goals. Marveaux scored his only goal of the season against Bulgarian club Lokomotiv Sofia in the first round of the UEFA Cup. His transition to Lacombe was further hampered during the 2008–09 season when, while playing with the France under-21 team, he suffered a torn hamstring injury. The initial diagnosis of the injury required no surgery, however, in October, it was discovered that the injury was severe after club doctors revealed that a hematoma had formed around the hamstring. Marveaux underwent surgery and, subsequently, missed five months. He returned to the team in May 2009 and appeared in the final three matches of the season.

For the 2009–10 season, under new manager Frédéric Antonetti, a healthy Marveaux thrived having his best season to date. Marveaux posted career-highs in all statistical categories. He scored his first goal of the season on 13 September 2009 in a 1–0 win against Saint-Étienne. The following week, Marveaux netted the second goal in a 4–0 thrashing of Grenoble. In the return leg against Grenoble in 2010, he scored a double in another 4–0 win. The following week, Marveaux was instrumental in the team's 4–2 victory over the defending champions Bordeaux. He scored the opening goal in the 7th minute and assisted on the final goal scored by Asamoah Gyan. In the Coupe de France, Marveaux scored two goals, both of which came in a 4–0 victory over amateur club Saumur in the Round of 32. He finished the campaign by scoring in a 2–1 defeat to Sochaux and a 2–2 draw against Nice. Marveaux successful individual season of 38 total appearances and 12 goals was overshadowed by the team's collective display as Rennes finished mid-table and failed to qualify for Europe after appearing in the UEFA Cup in back-to-back seasons.

Due to having one year left on his contract, Marveaux was the subject of transfer speculation in the 2010 summer transfer window with English clubs Chelsea and Manchester United being the first to scout the player. In June 2010, West Ham offered £3 million for the player, however Rennes' general manager Pierre Dreossi denied the bid stating that Marveaux "will be with Rennes next season" and "I do not usually change my mind, I've demonstrated that in the past." Marveaux, indeed, began the 2010–11 season with Rennes starting in the team's opening match of the season against Lille. On 3 October, he scored his first goal of the season in a 3–1 win over Toulouse. The following month, in a match against Derby Breton rivals Brest, Marveaux aggravated a groin injury that had been plaguing him during the campaign. The following day, it was reported that Marveaux would not return to action until 2011.

=== Newcastle United ===
On 18 June 2011, Marveaux agreed and signed a five-year deal with Premier League club Newcastle United. He had reportedly been very close to joining Liverpool under the management of Kenny Dalglish. Marveaux rubbished claims he failed a medical at Anfield, confirming he could not agree terms.

He made his first competitive start in the Football League Cup second round in an away win at Scunthorpe United playing the full 120 minutes that included extra time. He started all Newcastle's other League Cup games until their elimination in the 4th round. Having only made a handful of substitute appearances in the league due to Newcastle's unbeaten stance in November, he got his opportunity in a 2–1 home win against Everton on 5 November 2011. However, he came off injured in the second half with a recurring problem with his groin.

It was confirmed on 18 November 2011 that he would require hip surgery, scheduled to be undertaken by Dr Marc Phillipon at the clinic of Dr Richard Steadman in Colorado.

He scored his first goal for Newcastle in a 1–1 UEFA Europa League draw with C.S. Marítimo on 22 November 2012. He scored his first ever Premier League goal in the Magpies' fixture at Emirates Stadium against Arsenal on 29 December 2012, which Newcastle lost 7–3. The goal was a simple tap in after a good piece of work from teammate Gabriel Obertan. He then set up Demba Ba for his 2nd goal of the game with a sublime cross using the outside of his foot.

On 5 May 2016, Newcastle United announced that Marveaux and teammate Gabriel Obertan had been released.

==== Guingamp (loan) ====
On 22 July 2014, Guingamp announced the loan of Marveaux on a season-long loan with an option to buy. Marveaux made his competitive debut as a 69th-minute substitute for Christophe Mandanne in the Trophée des Champions on 2 August, which his team lost 0–2 against Paris Saint-Germain at the Workers Stadium in Beijing. He scored his first goals in a 2–0 Europa League victory over PAOK on 2 October, netting in the 47th and 50th minutes.

=== Lorient ===
On 15 July 2016, it was announced that Marveaux had joined Ligue 1-club FC Lorient.

He was loaned to AS Nancy in January 2019 until the end of the season.

=== Charlotte Independence ===
On 29 June 2021, it was announced Marveaux had signed for USL Championship side Charlotte Independence.

== International career ==
Marveaux was born in France to a Martiniquais father and a French mother. Marveaux is a former French under-21 international having earned caps with the team from 2006 to 2008.

== Career statistics ==
As of 1 July 2019

Appearances and goals by club, season and competition
Club	Season	League			National Cup		League Cup		Continental		Other		Total		Ref.
Club	Season	Division	Apps	Goals	Apps	Goals	Apps	Goals	Apps	Goals	Apps	Goals	Apps	Goals	Ref.
Rennes	2006–07	Ligue 1	28	5	0	0	3	1	—		—		31	6	
Rennes	2007–08	Ligue 1	24	0	1	0	2	0	5 (Note: Appearances in UEFA Cup)	1	—		32	1	
Rennes	2008–09	Ligue 1	5	0	0	0	0	0	1	0	—		6	0	
Rennes	2009–10	Ligue 1	35	10	3	2	0	0	—		—		38	12	
Rennes	2010–11	Ligue 1	10	1	0	0	0	0	—		—		10	1	
Rennes	Total		102	16	4	2	5	1	6	1	0	0	117	20	–
Newcastle United	2011–12	Premier League	7	0	0	0	3	0	—		—		10	0	
Newcastle United	2012–13	Premier League	22	1	1	0	1	0	12 (Note: Appearances in UEFA Europa League)	1	—		36	2	
Newcastle United	2013–14	Premier League	9	0	0	0	2	0	—		—		11	0	
Newcastle United	Total		38	1	1	0	6	0	12	1	0	0	57	2	–
Guingamp (loan)	2014–15	Ligue 1	24	1	2	0	0	0	6	2	1 (Note: Appearance in Trophée des Champions)	0	33	3	
Lorient	2016–17	Ligue 1	24	5	2	0	1	0	–		–		27	5	
Lorient	2017–18	Ligue 2	27	7	2	1	0	0	–		–		29	8	
Lorient	2018–19	Ligue 2	0	0	0	0	0	0	–		–		0	0	
Lorient	Total		51	12	4	1	1	0	0	0	0	0	56	13	–
Nancy (loan)	2018–19	Ligue 2	9	5	0	0	0	0	–		–		9	5	
Career total			224	35	11	3	12	1	24	4	1	0	272	43	
