= Jérémy Pied =

French association football player (born 1989)

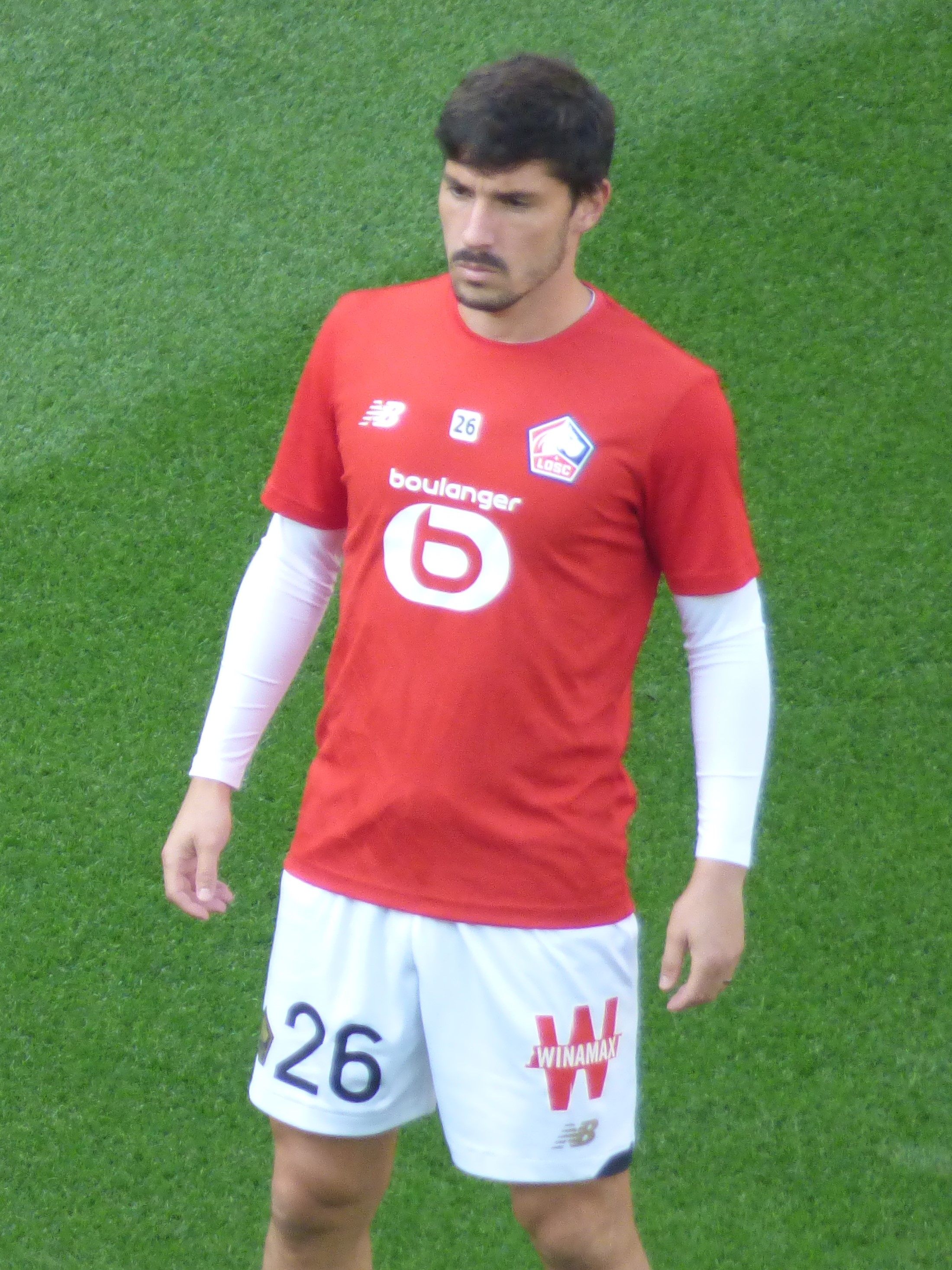
- Pied with for Lille in 2021

Personal information
- Full name: Jérémy Victor Pied
- Date of birth: 23 February 1989 (age 37)
- Place of birth: Grenoble, France
- Height: 1.73 m (5 ft 8 in)
- Position: Right-back

Youth career
- 2004–2009: Lyon

Senior career*
Years	Team	Apps	(Gls)
2009–2012	Lyon	40	(4)
2009–2012	Lyon B	9	(0)
2009–2010	→ Metz (loan)	37	(4)
2012–2016	Nice	82	(1)
2014–2015	→ Guingamp (loan)	28	(2)
2014	Nice B	1	(1)
2016–2018	Southampton	6	(0)
2018–2022	Lille	24	(0)
2018	Lille B	1	(0)
Total		228	(12)

International career
2011	France U21	1	(0)
- * Club domestic league appearances and goals

Jérémy Victor Pied (born 23 February 1989) is a French former professional footballer who played as a right-back.

Pied is a product of the Lyon academy and made his professional debut for the club in August 2010. In 2009, he had a loan spell with Metz before joining Nice permanently in 2012. Pied spent the 2014–15 season on loan at Guingamp. In 2016, he moved to Southampton before he joined Lille in 2018. He represented his country at under-21 level.

== Club career ==
=== Lyon ===
Born in Grenoble, Pied made his Ligue 1 debut for Olympique Lyonnais on the opening day of the 2010–11 season against Monaco, coming on from the bench in the 76th minute for Bafétimbi Gomis in a goalless draw. He made a first Ligue 1 start in the game against Valenciennes in week 5 and scored a headed goal in the 26th minute from Jimmy Briand's cross. The match ended 1–1 with Pied being named the man of the match by L'Équipe. On 14 September 2010, he played his first UEFA Champions League match against Schalke 04, entering shortly after the hour mark, replacing Michel Bastos, the goalscorer in the 1–0 victory. Pied's promising performances earned him the trust of Claude Puel and he started playing regularly starting matches or coming in from the bench. On 2 October 2010, he played the full match against Nancy and made an assist to the second goal of the match scored by Briand. Lyon eventually won the game 3–2. On 17 October 2010, Pied again made the starting lineup in a vital match against Lille. After all four goals of the game were scored, he quickly picked up two yellow cards which saw him expelled from the game, but Lyon held on and won the game 3–1. On 14 November 2010, he volleyed the only goal of the match, and his second goal of the season, against Nice after Yoann Gourcuff's cross. On 3 December 2010, Olympique Lyonnais announced contract extension for Pied for two years until June 2014. Pied scored his third goal for Lyon in 4–0 victory over Nancy coming off the bench in the 69th minute and scoring a header from a Michel Bastos cross.

He scored his first 2011–12 Ligue 1 season goal on 27 August 2011 against Montpellier.

=== Nice ===
On 26 August 2012, Pied completed a move to Ligue 1 rivals OGC Nice, signing a four-year contract for €3 million transfer fee. He was loaned for the 2014–15 season to En Avant de Guingamp.

=== Southampton ===
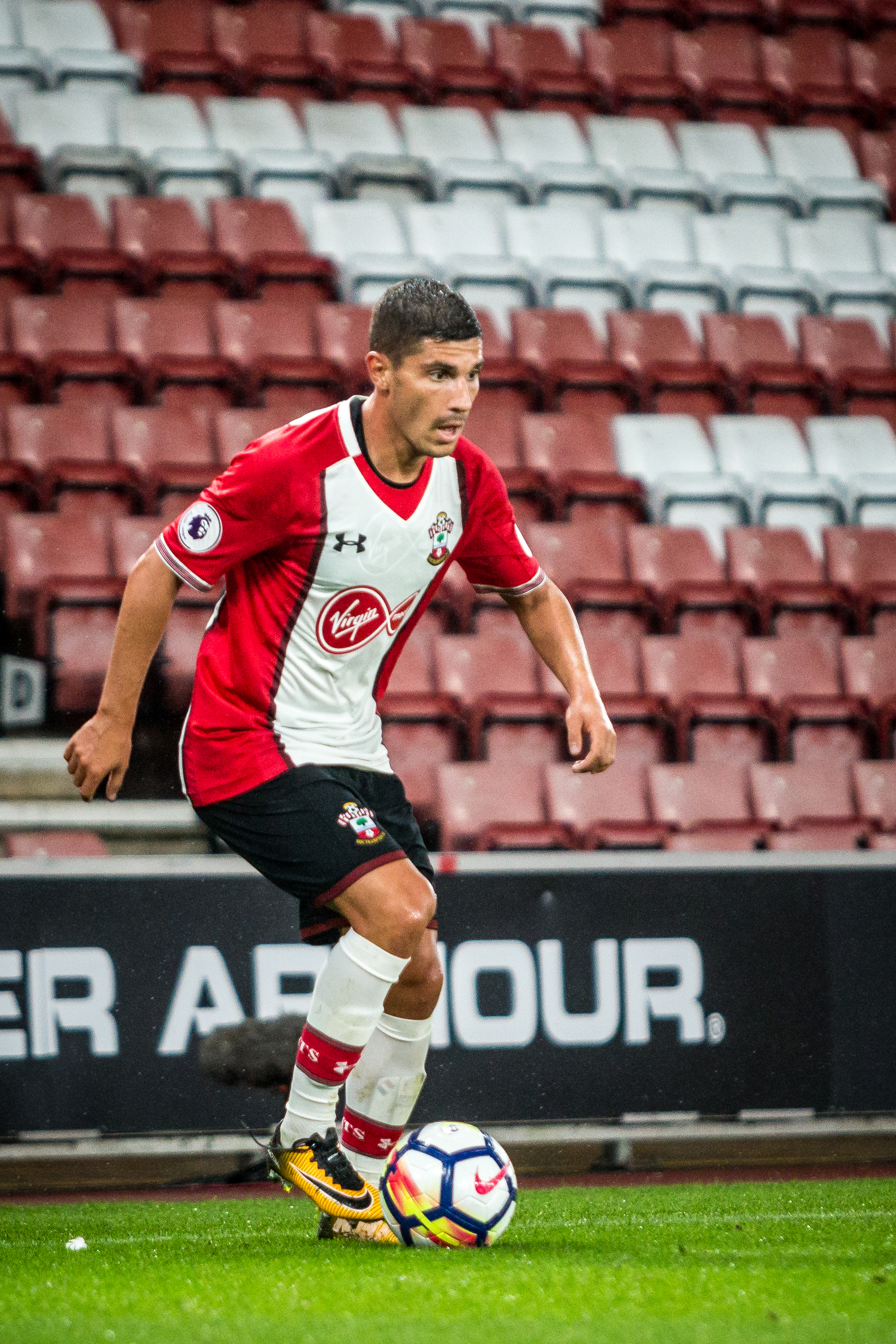
Pied playing for Southampton in 2017

On 1 August 2016, Pied rejoined manager Claude Puel for the third time in his career when he signed a two-year deal with Southampton, joining on a free transfer. He made his Southampton debut as a substitute against Watford on 13 August 2016. 12 days later, Pied suffered a knee injury that would keep him out for the rest of the season.

Pied eventually returned to League action on 3 December 2017, when he played the full 90 minutes in a 1–1 draw at AFC Bournemouth. At the end of the 2017–18 season, his contract with Southampton was not renewed.

=== Lille ===
In August 2018, free agent Pied signed a two-year deal with Lille.

== Career statistics ==
Appearances and goals by club, season and competition
Club	Season	League			National cup		League cup		Continental		Total	
Club	Season	Division	Apps	Goals	Apps	Goals	Apps	Goals	Apps	Goals	Apps	Goals
Metz (loan)	2009–10	Ligue 2	37	4	2	0	2	0	0	0	2	4
Lyon	2010–11	Ligue 1	25	3	2	0	1	0	7	0	35	3
Lyon	2011–12	Ligue 1	14	1	2	0	0	0	3	0	19	1
Lyon	2012–13	Ligue 1	1	0	0	0	0	0	0	0	1	0
Lyon	Total		40	4	4	0	1	0	10	0	55	4
Lyon B	2010–11	CFA	3	0	—		—		—		3	0
Lyon B	2011–12	CFA	6	0	—		—		—		6	0
Lyon B	Total		9	0	—		—		—		9	0
Nice	2012–13	Ligue 1	26	0	1	0	3	0	0	0	30	0
Nice	2013–14	Ligue 1	21	1	2	0	1	1	2	0	26	2
Nice	2014–15	Ligue 1	2	0	0	0	0	0	0	0	2	0
Nice	2015–16	Ligue 1	33	0	2	0	0	0	0	0	35	0
Nice	Total		82	1	5	0	4	1	2	0	93	2
Nice B	2013–14	CFA	1	1	—		—		—		1	1
Guingamp (loan)	2014–15	Ligue 1	28	2	4	2	2	0	7	0	41	4
Southampton	2016–17	Premier League	4	0	0	0	0	0	0	0	4	0
Southampton	2017–18	Premier League	2	0	1	0	1	0	0	0	4	0
Southampton	Total		6	0	1	0	1	0	0	0	8	0
Lille	2018–19	Ligue 1	11	0	1	0	1	0	—		13	0
Lille	2019–20	Ligue 1	5	0	1	0	2	0	1 (Note: Appearance(s) in UEFA Champions League)	0	9	0
Lille	2020–21	Ligue 1	6	0	3	0	—		2 (Note: Appearance(s) in UEFA Europa League)	0	11	0
Lille	2021–22	Ligue 1	2	0	1	0	—		0	0	3	0
Lille	Total		24	0	6	0	3	0	3	0	36	0
Lille B	2018–19	National 2	1	0	—		—		—		1	0
Career total			228	12	22	2	13	1	22	0	285	15

== Honours ==
Lyon

- Coupe de France: 2011–12
- Trophée des Champions: 2012

Lille

- Ligue 1: 2020–21
- Trophée des Champions: 2021
