= 2014–15 in French football =

Football in France
- Season: 2014–15

Men's football
- Ligue 1: Paris Saint-Germain
- Ligue 2: Troyes
- Championnat National: Red Star
- Coupe de France: Paris Saint-Germain
- Coupe de la Ligue: Paris Saint-Germain
- Trophée des Champions: Paris Saint-Germain

Women's football
- Division 1: Lyon
- Coupe de France: Lyon

The following article is a summary of the 2014–15 football season in France, which was the 81st season of competitive football in the country and ran from July 2014 to June 2015.

== League tables ==
=== Ligue 1 ===
Pos	Team	Pld	W	D	L	GF	GA	GD	Pts	Qualification or relegation
1	Paris Saint-Germain (C)	38	24	11	3	83	36	+47	83	Qualification for the Champions League group stage
2	Lyon	38	22	9	7	72	33	+39	75	Qualification for the Champions League group stage
3	Monaco	38	20	11	7	51	26	+25	71	Qualification for the Champions League third qualifying round
4	Marseille	38	21	6	11	76	42	+34	69	Qualification for the Europa League group stage
5	Saint-Étienne	38	19	12	7	51	30	+21	69	Qualification for the Europa League third qualifying round (Note: Since winners of the 2014–15 Coupe de la Ligue, Paris Saint-Germain, qualified for European competition based on their league position, the spot awarded to the Coupe de la Ligue winner (Europa League third qualifying round) is passed to the next best team in the table not already qualified for any European competition (in this case, the fifth-placed team).)
6	Bordeaux	38	17	12	9	47	44	+3	63	Qualification for the Europa League third qualifying round
7	Montpellier	38	16	8	14	46	39	+7	56	
8	Lille	38	16	8	14	43	42	+1	56	
9	Rennes	38	13	11	14	35	42	−7	50	
10	Guingamp	38	15	4	19	41	55	−14	49	
11	Nice	38	13	9	16	44	53	−9	48	
12	Bastia	38	12	11	15	37	46	−9	47	
13	Caen	38	12	10	16	54	55	−1	46	
14	Nantes	38	11	12	15	29	40	−11	45	
15	Reims	38	12	8	18	47	66	−19	44	
16	Lorient	38	12	7	19	44	50	−6	43	
17	Toulouse	38	12	6	20	43	64	−21	42	
18	Evian (R)	38	11	4	23	41	62	−21	37	Relegation to Ligue 2
19	Metz (R)	38	7	9	22	31	61	−30	30	Relegation to Ligue 2
20	Lens (Note: It was announced on 29 January 2015 that Lens' promotion from Ligue 2 at the end of the 2013–14 season has been ruled invalid, and will thus be automatically relegated to Ligue 2 for the 2015–16 season, regardless of where the team place this season. It has been confirmed by the French Football Federation that the decision of the Administrative Court of Besançon will be appealed.) (D, R)	38	7	8	23	32	61	−29	29	Relegation to Ligue 2

Source: Ligue 1
Rules for classification: 1) points; 2) goal difference; 3) number of goals scored
(C) Champions; (D) Disqualified; (R) Relegated

=== Ligue 2 ===
Pos	Team	Pld	W	D	L	GF	GA	GD	Pts	Promotion or Relegation
1	Troyes (C, P)	38	24	6	8	61	24	+37	78	Promotion to Ligue 1
2	Gazélec Ajaccio (P)	38	18	11	9	49	37	+12	65	Promotion to Ligue 1
3	Angers (P)	38	18	10	10	47	30	+17	64	Promotion to Ligue 1
4	Dijon	38	17	10	11	44	34	+10	61	
5	Nancy	38	15	13	10	53	39	+14	58	
6	Brest	38	14	15	9	41	27	+14	57	
7	Le Havre	38	14	13	11	47	37	+10	55	
8	Laval	38	11	21	6	41	34	+7	54	
9	Auxerre	38	12	16	10	48	42	+6	52	
10	Sochaux	38	13	13	12	39	37	+2	52	
11	Niort	38	11	17	10	41	42	−1	50	
12	Clermont	38	12	13	13	43	47	−4	49	
13	Nîmes (Note: It was announced on 17 March 2015 that Nîmes would be relegated to the next lower level at the end of the season, as a sanction for match fixing the previous season. The decision was overturned on 20 May 2015.)	38	12	10	16	44	57	−13	46	Relegated in the 17th March 2015 and then readmitted in 20th May 2015.
14	Créteil	38	10	15	13	44	52	−8	45	
15	Tours	38	12	8	18	49	54	−5	44	
16	Valenciennes	38	10	12	16	34	51	−17	42	
17	Ajaccio	38	9	14	15	32	42	−10	41	
18	Orléans (R)	38	9	13	16	36	47	−11	40	Relegation to Championnat National
19	Châteauroux (R)	38	7	11	20	31	63	−32	32	Relegation to Championnat National
20	Arles-Avignon (Note: Administratively relegated to Championnat de France Amateur for failing to guarantee sufficient capital.) (D, R)	38	7	9	22	31	59	−28	30	Relegation to CFA

Source: Ligue 2
Rules for classification: 1) points; 2) goal difference; 3) number of goals scored
(C) Champions; (D) Disqualified; (P) Promoted; (R) Relegated

=== Championnat National ===
Pos	Team	Pld	W	D	L	GF	GA	GD	Pts	Promotion or Relegation
1	Red Star (C, P)	34	21	7	6	68	30	+38	70	Promotion to Ligue 2
2	Paris FC (P)	34	19	9	6	50	28	+22	66	Promotion to Ligue 2
3	Bourg-Péronnas (P)	34	20	6	8	57	25	+32	66	Promotion to Ligue 2
4	Strasbourg	34	19	8	7	50	29	+21	65	
5	Luçon	34	15	13	6	40	25	+15	58	
6	Dunkerque	34	14	10	10	38	31	+7	52	
7	Boulogne	34	13	11	10	49	39	+10	50	
8	Fréjus Saint-Raphaël	34	12	13	9	42	38	+4	49	
9	Avranches	34	12	10	12	42	38	+4	46	
10	Colmar	34	12	9	13	40	44	−4	45	
11	Amiens	34	10	11	13	45	48	−3	41	
12	Le Poiré-sur-Vie (Note: Le Poiré-sur-Vie forfeited their position in the Championnat National for the next season due to financial issues, being sent down two divisions to the CFA 2.) (D, R)	34	10	11	13	36	44	−8	41	Relegation to Championnat de France Amateur
13	Marseille Consolat	34	11	7	16	40	58	−18	40	
14	Chambly	34	9	10	15	42	54	−12	37	
15	CA Bastia	34	6	16	12	32	42	−10	34	
16	Colomiers (Note: Colomiers was docked 1 point for fielding an unlicensed player against CA Bastia.) (R, D)	34	7	10	17	29	50	−21	30	Relegation to Championnat de France Amateur
17	Istres (Note: Istres also forfeited their position in the Championnat National for the next season due to financial issues, being sent down three divisions to the DHR.) (R)	34	4	10	20	27	61	−34	22	Relegation to Division Honneur Régionale
18	Épinal	34	2	9	23	30	73	−43	15	

Source: foot-national.com
Rules for classification: 1) points; 2) head-to-head points; 3) head-to-head goal difference; 4) goal difference; 5) number of goals scored
(C) Champions; (D) Disqualified; (P) Promoted; (R) Relegated

=== Championnat de France Amateur ===
Group A
Pos	Team	Pld	Pts
1	Sedan (C, P)	30	105
2	Quevilly	30	78
3	Paris Saint-Germain Reserves	30	73
4	IC Croix	30	72
5	Dieppe	30	71
6	Calais RUFC	30	69
7	AC Amiens	30	68
8	Romorantin	30	68
9	L'Entente SSG	30	67
10	Roye	30	67
11	Lens Reserves	30	66
12	Mantes	30	65
13	Arras FA	30	65
14	Lille Reserves (R)	30	65
15	Beauvais (R)	30	64
16	Ivry (R)	30	64

Source: French Football Federation
(C) Champions; (P) Promoted; (R) Relegated

Group B
Pos	Team	Pld	Pts
1	Belfort (C, P)	30	91
2	Fleury-Mérogis	30	80
3	Mulhouse	30	77
4	Montceau	30	75
5	Moulins	30	74
6	Sarre-Union	30	74
7	Aubervilliers	30	73
8	Jura Sud	30	70
9	Drancy	30	66
10	Troyes Reserves	30	65
11	Yzeure	30	64
12	Viry	30	64
13	Sochaux Reserves	30	63
14	Raon (R)	30	62
15	Metz Reserves (R)	30	62
16	Saint-Étienne Reserves (R)	30	61

Source: French Football Federation
(C) Champions; (P) Promoted; (R) Relegated

Group C
Pos	Team	Pld	Pts
1	Béziers (C, P)	30	90
2	Grenoble	30	89
3	Lyon Reserves	30	82
4	Martigues	30	78
5	Marignane	30	75
6	Villefranche	30	70
7	Rodez	30	70
8	Sète	30	69
9	Monaco Reserves	30	66
10	Nice Reserves	30	66
11	Monts d'Or	30	64
12	Lyon-Duchère	30	63
13	Le Pontet	30	62
14	Hyères	30	62
15	Montpellier Reserves (R)	30	57
16	Saint-Priest (R)	30	56

Source: French Football Federation
(C) Champions; (P) Promoted; (R) Relegated

Group D
Pos	Team	Pld	Pts
1	Lorient Reserves (C)	30	86
2	Les Herbiers (P)	30	86
3	Stade Bordelais	30	82
4	Concarneau	30	79
5	Trélissac	30	79
6	Pau	30	75
7	Vitré	30	75
8	Nantes Reserves	30	72
9	Stade Montois	30	67
10	Bordeaux Reserves	30	67
11	Stade Plabennécois	30	65
12	Tarbes	30	64
13	Saint-Malo	30	64
14	Vendée Fontenay	30	63
15	Pontivy (R)	30	55
16	Limoges (R)	30	50

Source: French Football Federation
(C) Champions; (P) Promoted; (R) Relegated
