= Moustapha Diallo (footballer, born 1986) =

Senegalese footballer

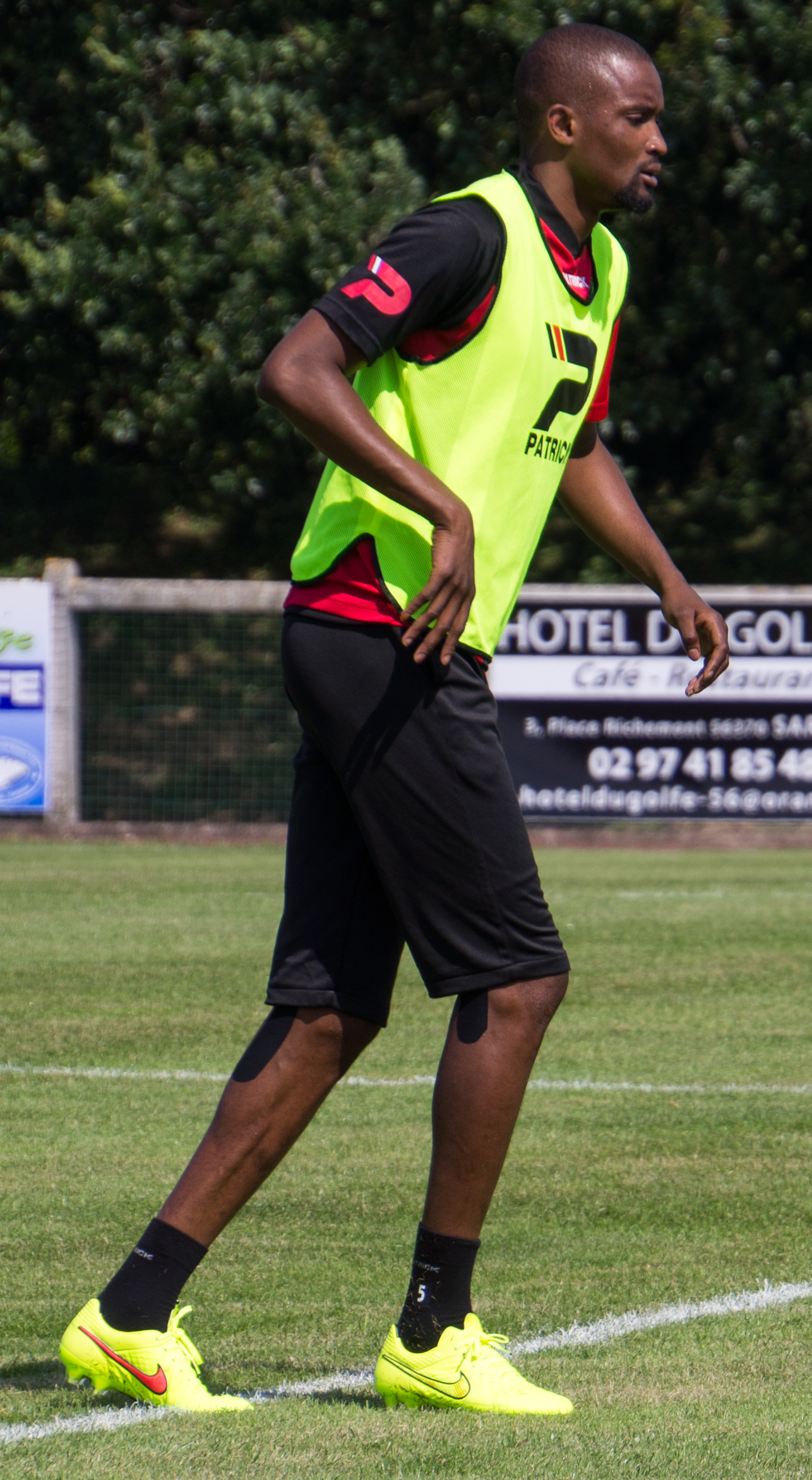
- Diallo training with Guingamp in 2014

Personal information
- Full name: Moustapha Elhadji Diallo
- Date of birth: 14 May 1986 (age 40)
- Place of birth: Dakar, Senegal
- Height: 1.92 m (6 ft 4 in)
- Position: Midfielder

Youth career
- 2001–2005: ASC Diaraf

Senior career*
Years	Team	Apps	(Gls)
2005–2006	ASC Diaraf		
2006–2007	Club Brugge	5	(0)
2007	Racing de Ferrol	7	(0)
2008–2009	ASC Diaraf		
2009–2018	Guingamp	253	(24)
2018–2019	Nîmes	7	(0)

International career
2007–2009	Senegal	4	(0)
- * Club domestic league appearances and goals

Moustapha Elhadji Diallo (born 14 May 1986) is a Senegalese former professional footballer who played as a midfielder. At international level, he made four appearances for the Senegal national team in 2009.

== Club career ==
=== Early career ===
Born in Dakar, Diallo began his career with ASC Diaraf and played here until July 2006, when he moved to Belgian club Club Brugge K.V. for €125,000. Having signed a two-year contract with Club Brugge he hardly played and was part of the reserve team.

After one year he joined Spanish side Racing de Ferrol for an undisclosed fee. In January 2008, after six months, he returned to his home club ASC Diaraf of the Senegal Premier League.

=== Guingamp ===
In June 2009 Diallo signed a three-year contract with French club En Avant de Guingamp in the French second division.

Until May 2013, he played more than 100 games for Guingamp, and contributed to the promotion of the Breton club into the Ligue 1 in summer 2013.

=== Nîmes ===
In July 2018, Diallo signed a two-year contract with Nîmes Olympique, also of Ligue 1. On the first matchday of the 2018–19 season, in a match against Angers SCO, he suffered a blow to his left ankle. He made a further seven appearances for the club, one over the full 90 minutes, until matchday 8 on 30 September against Montpellier when he had to be substituted off at half-time.

In October 2018, after being handicapped by recurring pain in his left ankle, Diallo underwent extensive examinations. It was reported that Diallo's left ankle was worn and damaged and had no cartilage and that he was declared unfit for high-level practice which would force him to put an end to his career. In March 2019, Nîmes announced they had agreed on the termination of his contract with Diallo who had been unable to play since sustaining the career-threatening injury. He was expected to retire.

== International career ==
Diallo played for Senegal at the 2009 African Nations Championship in Ivory Coast. He was named in the "CHAN all-star 11" by the CAF.

== Career statistics ==
=== International ===
Appearances and goals by national team and year
National team	Year	Apps	Goals
Senegal	2009	4	0
Total		16	0

== Honours ==
Guingamp

- Coupe de France: 2013–14
