= B&B Hotels =

Economy hotel chain founded in Brittany, France in 1990

- Company type: Private
- Industry: Hospitality
- Founded: 1990
- Headquarters: Brittany, France
- Number of locations: 770 (2024)
- Products: Hotels
- Owner: Goldman Sachs
- Website: hotel-bb.com

B&B HOTELS is a French budget hotel chain that was founded in Brest in Brittany in 1990, and has since expanded in 17 European countries.

== History ==
The hotel chain was founded in 1990 by François Branellec of Galaxie SA. The first hotels opened simultaneously in Brest and Saint-Malo in Brittany, France. 1998 marked the opening of the first hotel in Germany. Branellec sold the chain to Duke Street Capital in 2003. The name B&B HOTELS dates back to 2006, one year after the acquisition of Galaxie SA by the investment company Eurazeo. The B&B HOTELS Group absorbed its competitor "Village Hôtels" in 2007, then continued its development in France, Germany, Italy (2009) and Poland (2010). In 2013, the Group acquired 4 hotels in Spain and opened a new hotel in the Czech Republic. The Group opened at Disneyland Paris in 2015. 2016 marked the acquisition of the Sidorme Group with 19 hotels in Spain. B&B HOTELS continued its international development in Brazil (2017), Switzerland, Belgium, Portugal and Slovenia (2018). Their 500th establishment opened in Palermo, Italy in 2019. In 2022, the Group inaugurated its 52nd establishment in Île-de-France and its first in the French overseas departments and territories (Martinique).

== Corporate affairs ==
=== Ownership ===
The group was acquired by British fund Duke Street Capital in 2003. Then Galaxie SA was sold to Eurazeo in 2005, and one year later, Galaxie SA rebranded as B&B HOTELS. In 2010, Eurazeo sold the hotel chain to Carlyle Group, one of the largest US private equity funds. In 2015, Paris-based investment fund PAI Partners bought it from Carlyle. In July 2019, PAI Partners sold B&B HOTELS to Goldman Sachs and ATP.

=== Concept ===
B&B HOTELS is positioned in the budget hotel sector, competing with chains such as Ibis, Holiday Inn and Kyriad. The model includes a breakfast buffet, free Wi-Fi, remote check-in and check-out. The chain does not own all its hotels and operates mainly on a management-agent basis.

=== Sponsoring ===
The group once co-sponsored a professional cycling team, the B&B HOTELS p/b KTM, which participated in the Tour de France, but has since folded.

== Locations ==
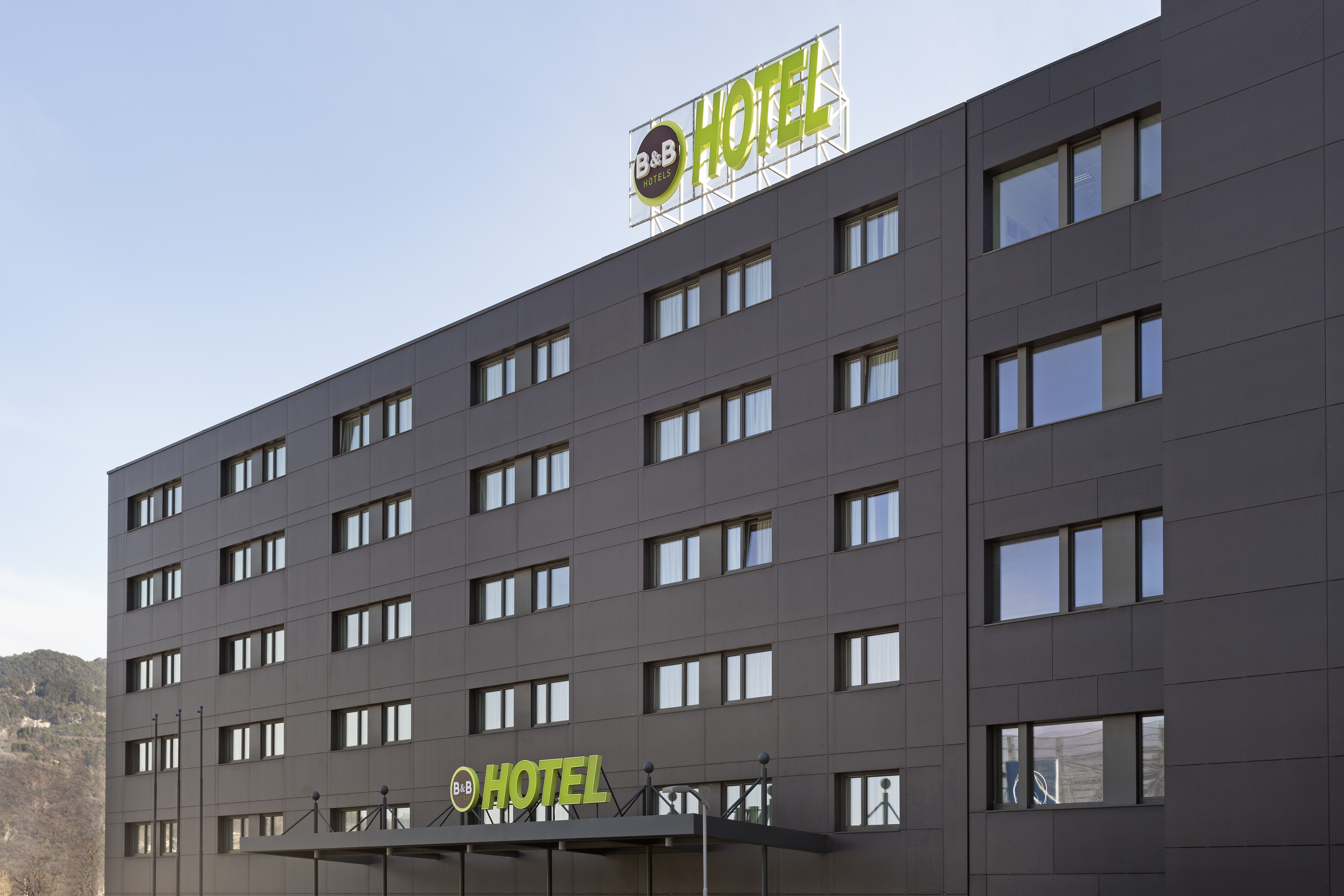
B&B Hotel in Trento, Italy

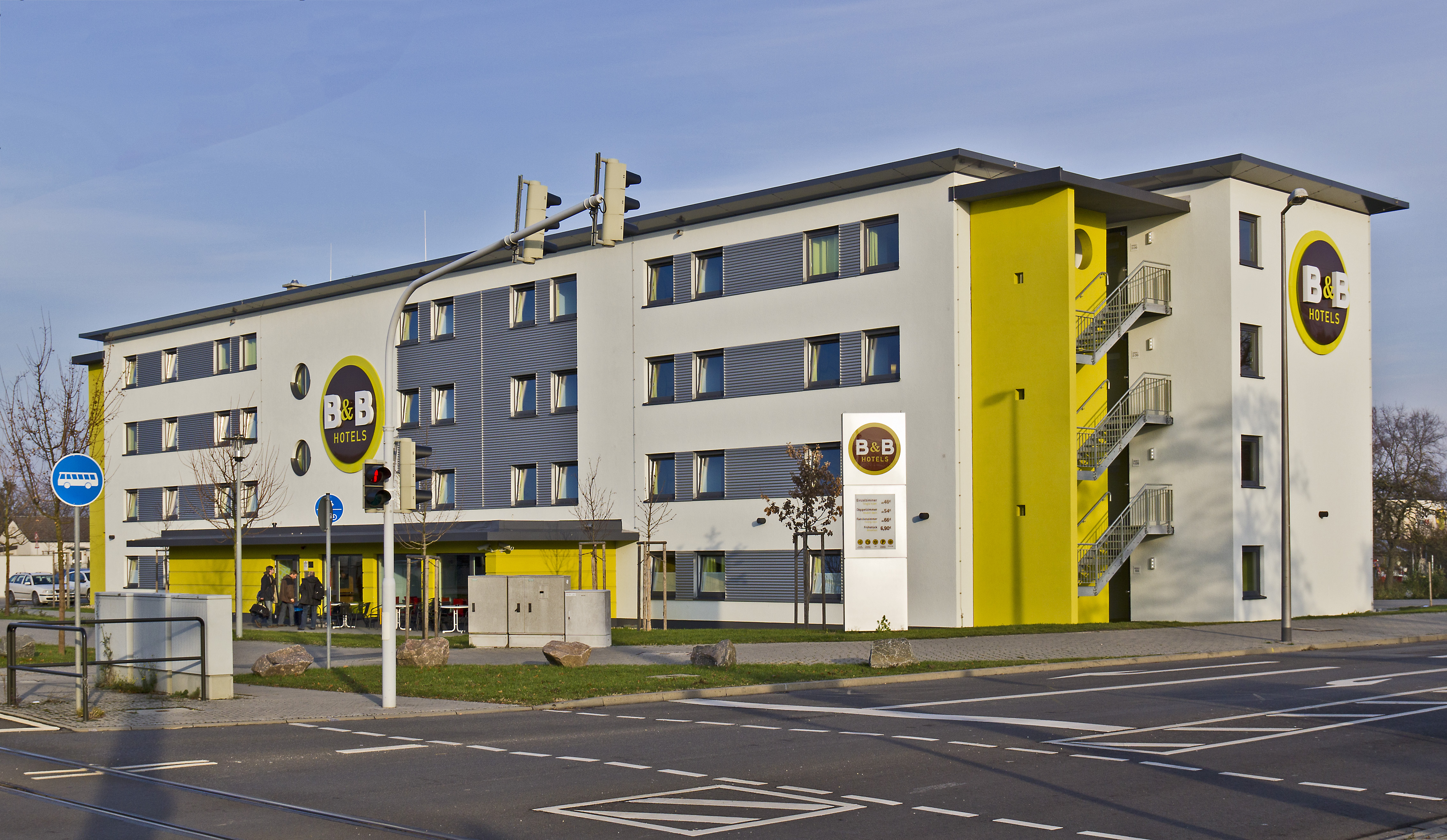
B&B Hotel in Mannheim, Germany

As of September 2025, the chain manages over 700 hotels, including 444 hotels in France and 236 hotels in Germany. It also has locations in England, Italy, Spain, Portugal, Czech Republic, Belgium, Austria, Poland, and Brazil.

=== France ===
In 1990 the first hotels opened in Brest and Saint-Malo. In 2007 the group acquired Village Hotels and added 60 new hotels to its portfolio in France. In 2012, the 200th hotel was opened. In 2015, it opened in Disneyland Paris. As of July 2022, B&B HOTELS manages 444 hotels in France, making it one of the country's largest hotel operators in the economy segment.

=== Germany ===
B&B HOTELS is one of Germany's biggest hotel chain groups by number of hotels. As of September 2025, there are a total of 236 hotels in Germany. In September 1998 the first hotel in Germany was opened in Ingolstadt. The second hotel opened a year later in Genshagen near Berlin. This was followed by the Hanover and Cologne locations in 2000. The following year, Braunschweig, Leipzig and Würselen near Aachen were added. In 2002 the company continued to grow and set up another location in Bochum. In 2006, further locations were opened in Niederrad and Munich. In the following years a further 51 hotels were added across the country.
