= Francis Dady Ngoye =

Congolese footballer (born 1990)

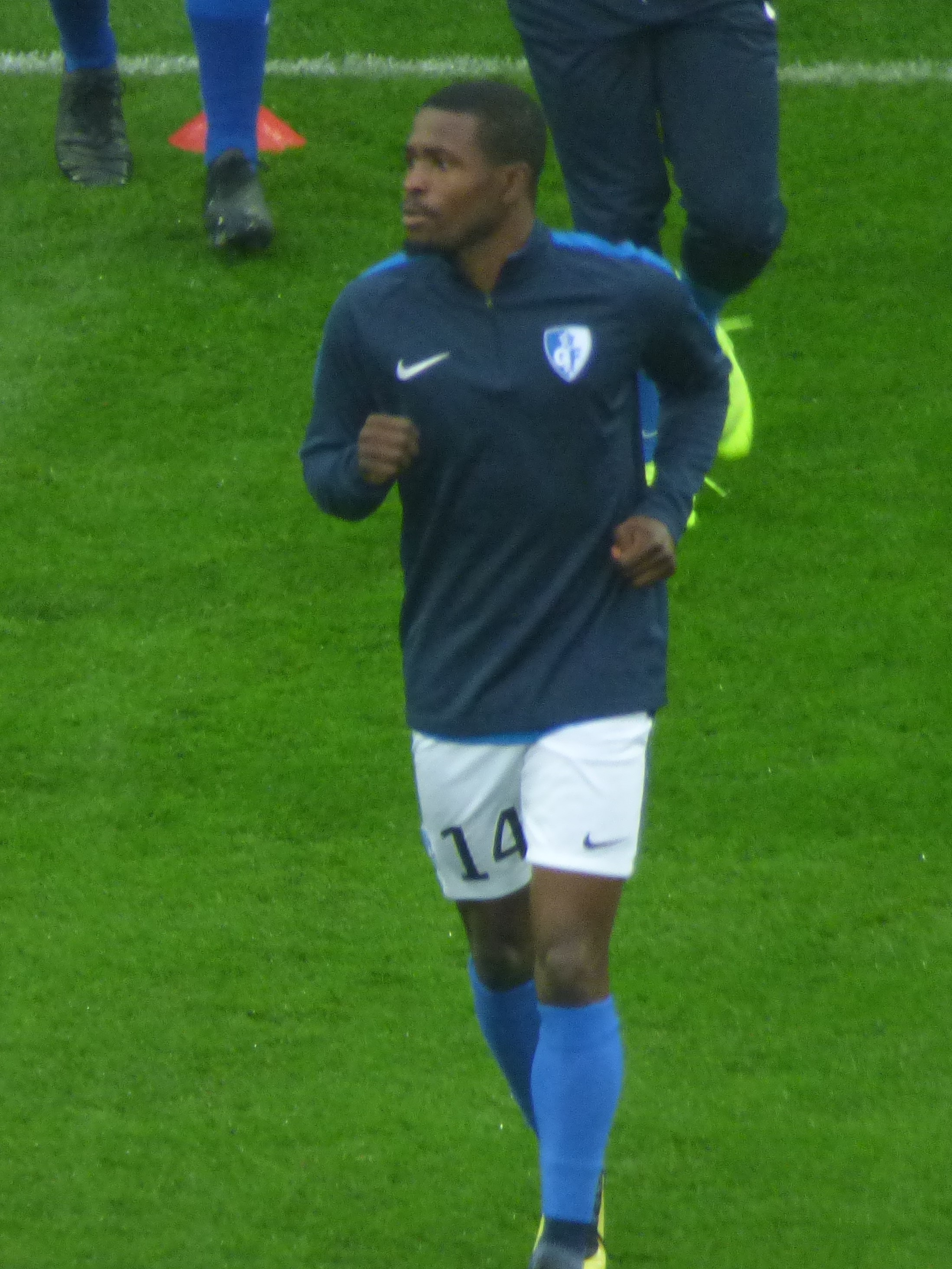
- Dady Ngoye with Grenoble in 2018

Personal information
- Date of birth: 4 January 1990 (age 36)
- Place of birth: Kinshasa, Zaire
- Height: 1.69 m (5 ft 7 in)
- Position: Midfielder

Team information
- Current team: Thonon Evian

Youth career
- 2005–2009: Grenoble

Senior career*
Years	Team	Apps	(Gls)
2009–2011	Grenoble	41	(0)
2013–2016	Yzeure	128	(10)
2016–2019	Grenoble	60	(8)
2019–2020	Rodez B	10	(0)
2020–	Thonon Evian	7	(0)
- * Club domestic league appearances and goals as of 18:38, 7 June 2022 (UTC)

Francis Dady Ngoye (born 4 January 1990) is a Congolese professional footballer who plays as a midfielder for Championnat National 1 club Thonon Evian.

== Career ==
Born in Kinshasa, Zaire, Dady Ngoye moved to France at the age of 2. A youth product of Grenoble, Dady Ngoye joined Yzeure and in 2016 moved back to his childhood club Grenoble. He made his professional debut for Grenoble in a 1–0 Ligue 2 win over Sochaux on 27 July 2018.

== Honours ==
Thonon Evian

- Championnat National 3: 2021–22
