= Christophe Mandanne =

French professional footballer (born 1985)

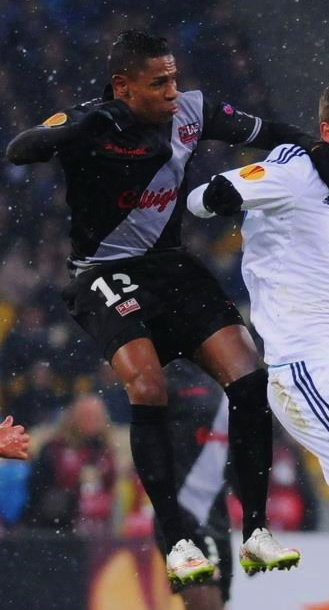
- Mandanne with En Avant de Guingamp in 2015

Personal information
- Date of birth: 7 February 1985 (age 41)
- Place of birth: Toulouse, France
- Height: 1.71 m (5 ft 7 in)
- Position: Striker

Youth career
- 2001–2003: Le Havre

Senior career*
Years	Team	Apps	(Gls)
2003–2005	Le Havre	36	(3)
2005–2007	→ Tours (loan)	65	(18)
2007–2012	Dijon	117	(20)
2008–2009	→ Stade Reims (loan)	17	(6)
2012	→ Guingamp (loan)	19	(7)
2012–2015	Guingamp	92	(18)
2014	Guingamp B	1	(0)
2015–2016	Al-Fujairah	24	(7)
2016–2017	Nancy	20	(1)
2016–2017	Nancy B	2	(0)
2017–2019	Châteauroux	51	(8)
2021-	JS Saint-Pierroise	0	(0)
- * Club domestic league appearances and goals as of 20:18, 14 March 2018 (UTC)

Christophe Mandanne (born 7 February 1985) is a French professional footballer who plays as a striker for Réunion club JS Saint-Pierroise.

== Career statistics ==
As of match played on 1 July 2019

Appearances and goals by club, season and competition
Club	Season	League			Cup		League Cup		Other		Total	
Club	Season	Division	Apps	Goals	Apps	Goals	Apps	Goals	Apps	Goals	Apps	Goals
Dijon	2008–09	Ligue 2	3	0	0	0	—		—		3	0
Dijon	2009–10	Ligue 2	36	10	0	0	1	0	—		37	10
Dijon	2010–11	Ligue 2	23	4	0	0	1	0	—		24	4
Dijon	2011–12	Ligue 1	10	1	0	0	2	0	—		12	1
Dijon	Total		72	15	0	0	4	0	0	0	76	15
Reims (loan)	2008–09	Ligue 2	17	6	0	0	—		—		17	6
Guingamp (loan)	2011–12	Ligue 2	19	7	0	0	—		—		19	7
Guingamp	2012–13	Ligue 2	33	6	1	1	1	0	—		35	7
Guingamp	2013–14	Ligue 1	28	1	4	0	—		—		32	1
Guingamp	2014–15	Ligue 1	31	11	5	3	2	1	8	2	46	17
Guingamp	Total		92	18	10	4	3	1	8	2	113	25
Guingamp II	2013–14	CFA 2	1	0	—		—		—		1	0
Al-Fujairah	2015–16	UAE Pro-League	24	7	0	0	4	1	—		28	8
Nancy	2016–17	Ligue 1	20	1	2	0	1	2	—		23	3
Nancy II	2016–17	CFA 2	2	0	—		—		—		2	0
Châteauroux	2017–18	Ligue 2	25	5	4	5	0	0	—		29	10
Châteauroux	2018–19	Ligue 2	26	3	3	0	1	0	—		30	3
Châteauroux	Total		51	8	7	5	1	0	0	0	59	13
Career totals			298	62	19	9	13	4	8	2	338	77

== Honours ==
Guingamp

- Coupe de France: 2013–14
