= Laurent Dos Santos =

French footballer (born 1993)

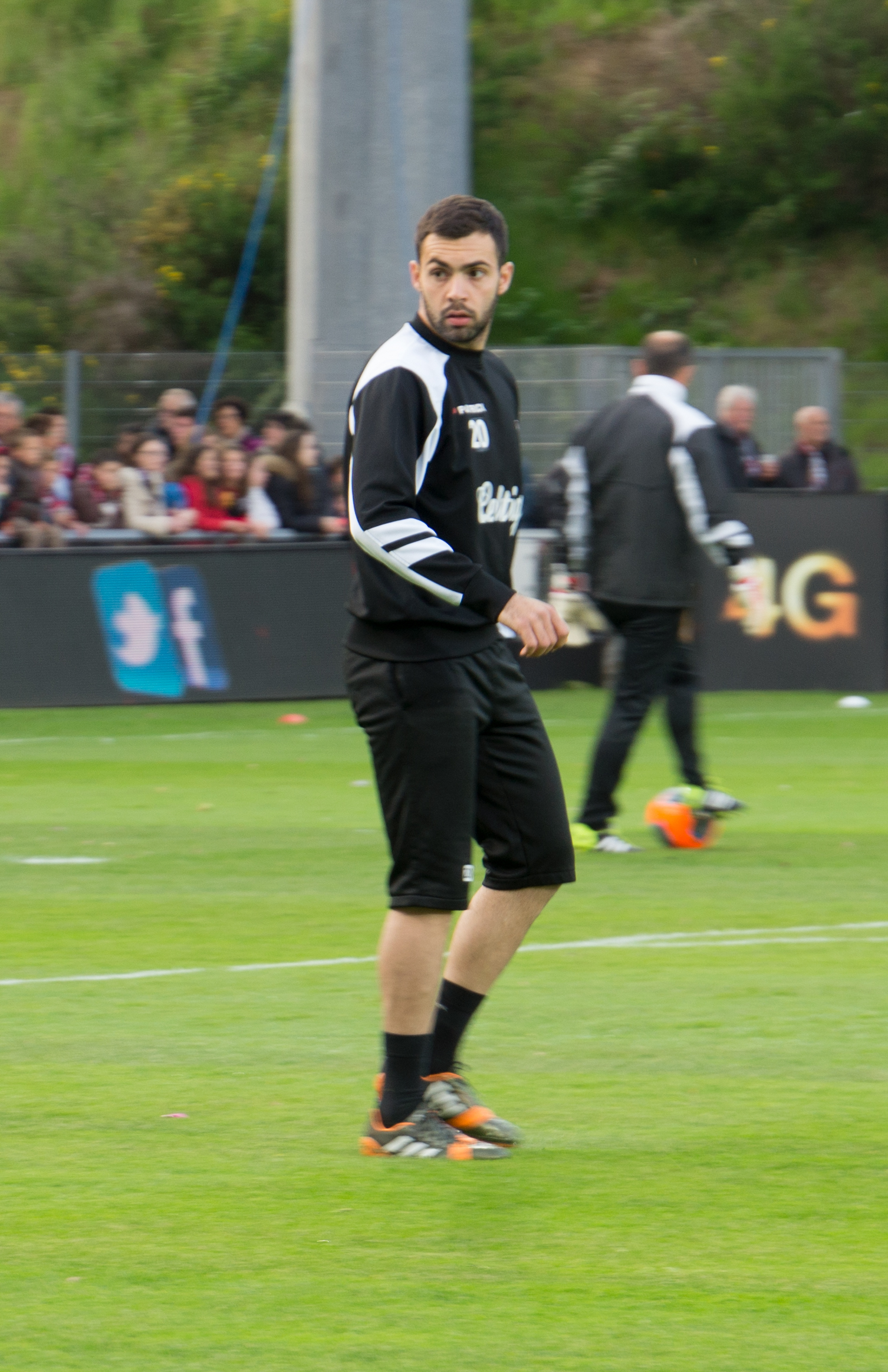
- Dos Santos in 2014

Personal information
- Date of birth: 21 September 1993 (age 33)
- Place of birth: Montmorency, France
- Height: 1.77 m (5 ft 10 in)
- Position: Midfielder

Team information
- Current team: Plérin FC

Senior career*
Years	Team	Apps	(Gls)
2012–2016	Guingamp B	25	(1)
2013–2016	Guingamp	34	(0)
2016–2017	Strasbourg	24	(0)
2017–2022	Valenciennes	132	(4)
2022–2024	Villefranche	25	(0)
2024–	Plérin FC		
- * Club domestic league appearances and goals as of 2 July 2024

Laurent Dos Santos (born 21 September 1993) is a French professional footballer who plays as a midfielder for Plérin FC.

== Career ==
On 23 November 2013, Dos Santos made his professional debut with Guingamp in a 2013–14 Ligue 1 match against Montpellier.

== Personal life ==
Born in France, Dos Santos holds French and Portuguese nationalities.
