= Claudio Beauvue =

Guadeloupean footballer (born 1988)

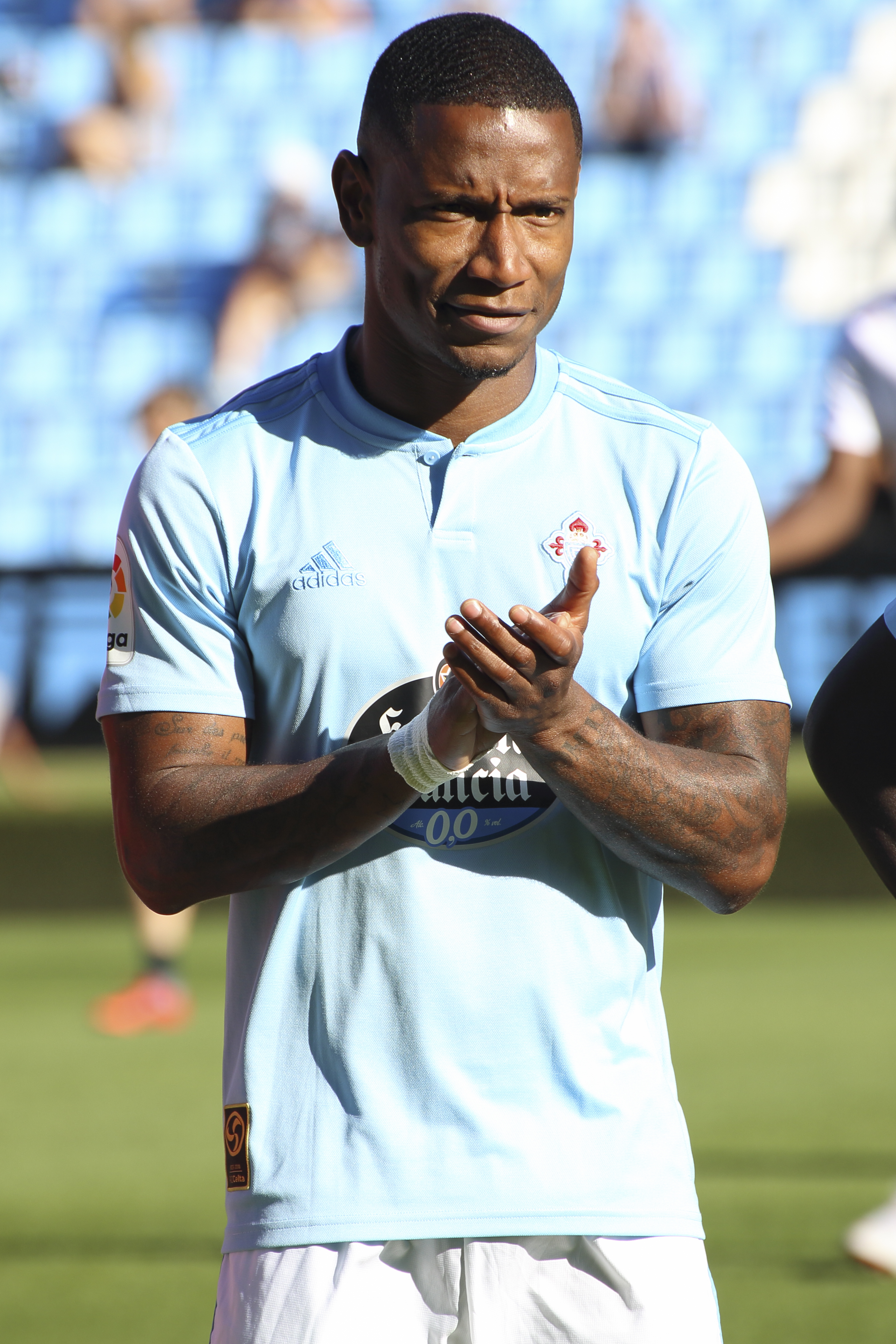
- Beauvue with Celta in 2018

Personal information
- Full name: Claudio Benoît Beauvue
- Date of birth: 16 April 1988 (age 38)
- Place of birth: Saint-Claude, Guadeloupe, France
- Height: 1.74 m (5 ft 9 in)
- Positions: Winger; forward

Team information
- Current team: Le Gosier

Youth career
- 2002–2003: Carquefou
- 2003–2006: Nantes

Senior career*
Years	Team	Apps	(Gls)
2006–2012	Troyes	99	(17)
2011–2012	→ Châteauroux (loan)	37	(10)
2012–2013	Châteauroux	21	(6)
2013	→ Bastia (loan)	15	(2)
2013–2015	Guingamp	72	(22)
2015–2016	Lyon	19	(5)
2016–2020	Celta Vigo	23	(2)
2017–2018	→ Leganés (loan)	28	(2)
2018–2019	→ Caen (loan)	25	(3)
2019	→ Caen B (loan)	1	(1)
2020–2021	Deportivo La Coruña	26	(3)
2021–2023	Boulogne	26	(3)
2022	Boulogne B	1	(0)
2023	Ivry	12	(3)
2023–2025	Calais	26	(5)
2025	Le Gosier	23	(24)

International career
2016–2018	Guadeloupe	3	(1)
- * Club domestic league appearances and goals

Claudio Benoît Beauvue (born 16 April 1988) is a Guadeloupean professional footballer who plays as a winger and forward.

Beauvais has spent the majority of his career in France, notably with Troyes, Châteauroux, Guingamp, Lyon, and Caen. He has also played for Celta Vigo, Leganés, and Deportivo La Coruña in Spain.

== Club career ==
=== Troyes ===
Beauvue joined Troyes from Nantes' academy in 2006. He made his professional debut on 24 August 2007 against Bastia in the 2007–08 Ligue 2 season. He signed his first professional contract with the club in the summer of 2008.

=== Chateauroux ===
On 23 March 2011, Beauvue was loaned (with an option to make deal permanent) for the 2011–12 Ligue 2 season to Châteauroux. He made his first start against Guingamp and scored 10 goals in 37 matches during the Ligue 2 campaign, with Châteauroux exercising their option to make the loan deal permanent.

On 19 October 2012, during the 2012–13 season, Beauvue scored a hat-trick in a Ligue 2 match against Gazélec Ajaccio (3–1).

=== Bastia ===
On 29 January 2013, Beauvue was loaned – with an option to buy – to Ligue 1 side Bastia. He made his first start for the Corsican side against Evian and scored his first and only goal for the side during the 36th matchday of the 2012–13 Ligue 1 season against Montpellier. At the end of the season, Bastia did not opt to purchase Beauvue.

=== Guingamp ===
On 30 June 2013, Beauvue signed for Guingamp. During his first season, he lifted the Coupe de France with his team after they beat Rennes 2–0 at the Stade de France.

During the next season, Beauvue became a regular starter for the side during its Ligue 1 and UEFA Europa League campaign. He scored five goals in the Europa League – one against Fiorentina, one against Dinamo Minsk, two against PAOK and one against Dynamo Kyiv – in a campaign in which Guingamp were able to qualify for the round of 16 of the Europa League for the first team in club history.

Beauvue finished the season with 22 goals in 46 games that season, fifth-most in Ligue 1 behind Alexandre Lacazette, André-Pierre Gignac, Zlatan Ibrahimović and Edinson Cavani.

=== Lyon ===
On 27 June 2015, Beauvue joined Lyon on a four-year contract. The transfer fee was estimated at €4.5 million, with €3 million bonus. He played his first match with the side against Paris Saint-Germain, a 2–0 loss in the Trophée des Champions played in Montreal. He scored his first goal with the club in a 1–0 win against former club Guingamp at the Stade du Roudourou. He did not celebrate the goal, however, and opted to spend the night at the Panier des Salades, a bar frequented by Guingamp fans.

Despite his numerous first-team starts, Beauvue failed to fit in with the Lyon style of play, which is more focused on passing and possession. He scored his last goal for the club against another former side, Troyes.

=== Celta Vigo ===
On 16 January 2016, during the winter transfer window, Beauvue joined Spanish La Liga side Celta Vigo on a €5 million transfer fee, along with a €2.5 million bonus. He signed a five-year contract.

==== Loan to Leganés ====
On 29 August 2017, Beauvue was loaned to fellow top tier club Leganés, for one season.

==== Loan to Caen ====
On 30 August 2018, Beauvue joined Caen on loan for the 2018–19 season. Caen secured an option to sign him permanently.

=== Deportivo La Coruña ===
On 18 January 2020, Beauvue signed a 18-month contract with Deportivo La Coruña. He scored two goals in their final match of the season against Fuenlabrada (2-1). This game was postponed from the final matchday on 20 July. Beauvue (who was on holiday) travelled from the other side of the world to A Coruña for playing the match on 7 August as it was rescheduled very late. Despite the relegation of Deportivo to the Segunda B the striker decided to stay at the club.

=== Boulogne ===
In August 2021, Beauvue signed with Boulogne in the Championnat National, the third tier of French football.

=== Ivry ===
In February 2023, Beauvue joined Championnat National 3 club Ivry until the end of the season.

=== Calais ===
On 29 July 2023, Beauvue signed for Régional 1 club Calais. They achieved promotion to the Championnat National 3 at the end of the season.

== International career ==
Beauvue was born in Guadeloupe and moved to metropolitan France at a young age. He was called up to the Guadeloupe team in 2008 and scored his first goal for them in 2016, against Suriname.

== Career statistics ==
=== Club ===
Club	Season	League			National cup		League cup		Continental		Other		Total	
Club	Season	Division	Apps	Goals	Apps	Goals	Apps	Goals	Apps	Goals	Apps	Goals	Apps	Goals
Troyes	2007–08	Ligue 2	9	1	0	0	1	0	—		—		10	1
Troyes	2008–09	Ligue 2	37	3	2	0	1	0	—		—		40	3
Troyes	2009–10	Championnat National	34	11	1	1	1	1	—		—		36	13
Troyes	2010–11	Ligue 2	19	2	0	0	1	0	—		—		20	2
Troyes	Total		99	17	3	1	4	1	—		—		106	19
Châteauroux (loan)	2011–12	Ligue 2	37	10	3	0	1	0	—		—		41	10
Châteauroux	2012–13	Ligue 2	21	6	1	1	1	0	—		—		23	7
Châteauroux	Total		58	16	4	1	2	0	—		—		64	17
Bastia (loan)	2012–13	Ligue 1	15	2	0	0	0	0	—		—		15	2
Guingamp	2013–14	Ligue 1	36	5	5	2	1	0	—		—		42	7
Guingamp	2014–15	Ligue 1	36	17	5	4	2	1	8 (Note: Appearance(s) in UEFA Europa League)	5	1 (Note: Appearance(s) in Trophée des Champions)	0	52	27
Guingamp	Total		72	22	10	6	3	1	8	5	1	0	94	34
Lyon	2015–16	Ligue 1	19	5	1	1	2	2	6 (Note: Appearance(s) in UEFA Champions League)	0	1	0	29	8
Celta Vigo	2015–16	La Liga	10	1	3	0	—		—		—		13	1
Celta Vigo	2016–17	La Liga	13	1	0	0	—		6	1	—		19	2
Celta Vigo	Total		23	2	3	0	—		6	1	—		32	3
Leganés (loan)	2017–18	La Liga	28	2	7	1	—		—		—		35	3
Caen (loan)	2018–19	Ligue 1	25	3	3	0	0	0	—		—		28	3
Caen B (loan)	2018–19	Championnat National 3	1	1	—		—		—		—		1	1
Deportivo La Coruña	2019–20	Segunda División	11	2	0	0	—		—		—		11	2
Deportivo La Coruña	2020–21	Segunda División B	15	1	2	0	—		—		—		17	1
Deportivo La Coruña	Total		26	3	2	0	—		—		—		28	3
Boulogne	2021–22	Championnat National	11	0	0	0	—		—		—		11	0
Boulogne	2022–23	Championnat National 2	15	3	0	0	—		—		—		15	3
Boulogne	Total		26	3	0	0	—		—		—		26	3
Boulogne B	2021–22	Championnat National 3	1	0	—		—		—		—		1	0
Ivry	2022–23	Championnat National 3	12	3	0	0	—		—		—		12	3
Calais	2023–24	Régional 1			2	1	—		—		—		2	1
Calais	2024–25	Championnat National 3	26	5	3	0	—		—		—		29	5
Calais	Total		26	5	5	1	—		—		—		31	6
Le Gosier	2025-26	Regional 1 Vito	23	24									23	24
Career total			454	105	38	11	11	4	14	6	2	0	519	126

=== International ===
Scores and results list Guadeloupe's goal tally first, score column indicates score after each Beauvue goal.

List of international goals scored by Claudio Beauvue
No.	Date	Venue	Opponent	Score	Result	Competition
1	29 March 2016	André Kamperveen Stadion, Paramaribo, Suriname	Suriname	1–0	2–3	2017 Caribbean Cup qualification

== Honours ==
Guingamp

- Coupe de France: 2013–14

Calais

- Régional 1: 2023–24
