= 2014–15 Ligue 1 =

77th season of top-tier French football

Ligue 1
- Season: 2014–15
- Dates: 8 August 2014 – 23 May 2015
- Champions: Paris Saint-Germain; 5th Ligue 1 title 5th French title
- Relegated: Lens; Metz; Evian
- Champions League: Paris Saint-Germain; Lyon; Monaco
- Europa League: Marseille; Saint-Étienne; Bordeaux
- Matches: 380
- Goals: 947 (2.49 per match)
- Top goalscorer: Alexandre Lacazette (27 goals)
- Biggest home win: Paris Saint-Germain 6–0 Guingamp (8 May 2015)
- Biggest away win: Reims 0–5 Marseille (23 September 2014); Guingamp 2–7 Nice (26 October 2014); Toulouse 1–6 Marseille (6 March 2015)
- Highest scoring: Guingamp 2–7 Nice (26 October 2014)
- Longest winning run: 9 games Paris St Germain
- Longest unbeaten run: 17 games Paris Saint-Germain
- Longest winless run: 12 games Metz
- Longest losing run: 4 games Evian; Guingamp; Lorient; Marseille
- Highest attendance: 70,785; Lens 1–3 Paris Saint-Germain (17 October 2014)
- Lowest attendance: 5,488; Monaco 1–1 Reims (31 October 2014)
- Average attendance: 22,362

The 2014–15 Ligue 1 season was the 77th season since its establishment. Paris Saint-Germain were the two-time defending champions and successfully defended their title.

== Teams ==
There were 20 clubs in the league, with three promoted teams from Ligue 2 replacing the three teams that were relegated from Ligue 1 following the 2013–14 season. All clubs that secured Ligue 1 status for the season were subject to approval by the DNCG before becoming eligible to participate.

Metz was the first team to win promotion from Ligue 2 after a 3–0 victory against Auxerre at the Stade de l'Abbé-Deschamps, ending a six-year span in the lower divisions. Lens returned to the top level after a 2–0 victory against CA Bastia on 16 May 2014 and finished a three-year span in 2nd level. Finally, Caen returned for the first time in two years following a 2–2 draw with Dijon on 16 May 2014.

- Bastia
- Bordeaux
- Caen
- Evian
- Guingamp
- Lens
- Lille
- Lorient
- Lyon
- Marseille
- Metz
- Monaco
- Montpellier
- Nantes
- Nice
- Paris Saint-Germain
- Reims
- Rennes
- Saint-Étienne
- Toulouse

=== Stadia and locations ===
Location of teams in 2014–15 Ligue 1

Club	Location	Venue	Capacity
Bastia	Bastia	Stade Armand Cesari	16,480
Bordeaux	Bordeaux	Stade Chaban-Delmas	34,462
Caen	Caen	Stade Michel d'Ornano^{1}	21,215
Évian	Annecy	Parc des Sports	15,660
Guingamp	Guingamp	Stade du Roudourou	18,126
Lens	Lens	Stade de la Licorne; Stade de France	12,097; 81,338
Lille	Villeneuve-d'Ascq	Stade Pierre-Mauroy	50,186
Lorient	Lorient	Stade du Moustoir	18,890
Lyon	Lyon	Stade de Gerland	41,842
Marseille	Marseille	Stade Vélodrome^{3}	67,000
Metz	Metz	Stade Saint-Symphorien	26,661
Monaco	Monaco	Stade Louis II	18,500
Montpellier	Montpellier	Stade de la Mosson	32,939
Nantes	Nantes	Stade de la Beaujoire	38,285
Nice	Nice	Allianz Riviera	35,624
Paris Saint-Germain	Paris	Parc des Princes	48,712
Reims	Reims	Stade Auguste Delaune	21,684
Rennes	Rennes	Stade de la Route de Lorient	31,127
Saint-Étienne	Saint-Étienne	Stade Geoffroy-Guichard^{4}	38,458
Toulouse	Toulouse	Stadium Municipal^{5}	35,470

- ^{1}Due to Stade Michel d'Ornano hosting the 2014 FEI World Equestrian Games, Caen will host its two first home games at MMArena in Le Mans.
- ^{2}Lens home stadium, Stade Félix-Bollaert will be closed for the entire season, due to a renovation in preparation for UEFA Euro 2016. Lens will play their home games in various venues which are to be determined.
- ^{3}The Stade Vélodrome is currently undergoing renovation in preparation for UEFA Euro 2016. The stadium will be completed in time for the 2014-15 season, where capacity will be 67,000 - up from 48,000 the previous season.
- ^{4}The Stade Geoffroy-Guichard is currently undergoing renovation in preparation for UEFA Euro 2016. The current capacity is 38,458, the final capacity will be 41,965.
- ^{5}The Stadium Municipal is currently undergoing renovation in preparation for UEFA Euro 2016. The current capacity is not published yet but is a decrease from the original capacity of 35,470.

=== Personnel and kits ===
Team	Manager	Captain	Kit Manufacturer	Shirt sponsors (front)	Shirt sponsors (back)	Shirt sponsors (sleeve)	Shorts sponsors
Bastia	(France) Ghislain Printant	(France) Yannick Cahuzac	Kappa	Oscaro, Collectivité Territoriale de Corse, Corsica Ferries	Citroën	Technitoit, Haute-Corse	La Boucherie, Kontakt
Bordeaux	(France) Willy Sagnol	(Senegal) Ludovic Sané	Puma	Kia	Yezz	Groupe Pichet	None
Caen	(France) Patrice Garande	(Algeria) Laurent Agouazi	Nike	Guy Dauphin Environnement (H)/Campagne de France (A & 3), Groupe IDEC (H)/Guy Dauphin Environnement (A), Vizzy	SOS Malus	Wati B	Wati B
Evian	(France) Pascal Dupraz	(France) Olivier Sorlin	Kappa	MSC Croisières, Bontaz Centre	Bontaz Centre	SAT Autocars	Les Gets, No Publik
Guingamp	(France) Jocelyn Gourvennec	(France) Lionel Mathis	Patrick	Celtigel, Geodis Calberson, Breizh Cola	Mère Lalie	Celtarmor	BRIEUC biscuiterie, caramelerie, confiturerie
Lens	(New Caledonia) Antoine Kombouaré	(France) Jérôme Lemoigne	Umbro	Azerbaijan: Land of Fire, Invicta	Unibet	Triangle Intérim	McCain Foods
Lille	(France) René Girard	(France) Rio Mavuba	Nike	etixx, Groupe DLSI, NetBet	Yezz	Vacansoleil	None
Lorient	(France) Sylvain Ripoll	(Gabon) Bruno Ecuele Manga	Adidas	Jean Floc'h (H)/B&B Hotels (A), B&B Hotels (H)/Jean Floc'h (A)	Salaün Holidays	Virage Conseil	Lorient Agglomération
Lyon	(France) Hubert Fournier	(France) Maxime Gonalons	Adidas	Hyundai/Veolia (T, in UEFA matches), Cegid, MDA Electroménager	Intermarché	12ème homme d’Orange	Oknoplast
Marseille	(Argentina) Marcelo Bielsa	(France) Steve Mandanda	Adidas	Intersport	Turkish Airlines	Mutuelles du Soleil	Quick
Metz	(France) Albert Cartier	(France) Sylvain Marchal	Nike	Volvo Théobald (H)/Inter-Conseil Intérim (A), Moselle	Bigben	None	E.Leclerc Moselle
Monaco	(Portugal) Leonardo Jardim	(France) Jérémy Toulalan	Nike	Fedcom, Alain Afflelou	Alain Afflelou	Triangle Intérim	Orezza
Montpellier	(France) Rolland Courbis	(Brazil) Vitorino Hilton	Nike	Sud de France, Dyneff Gaz, Montpellier Métropole, Mutuelles du Soleil	La Région Languedoc-Roussillon	FAUN-Environnement	Système U, Wati B
Nantes	(Armenia) Michel Der Zakarian	(France) Olivier Veigneau	Umbro	Synergie, Système U, Proginov	Anvolia	Vitrans	etixx
Nice	(France) Claude Puel	(France) Didier Digard	Burrda	Mutuelles du Soleil, Métropole Nice Côte d'Azur, NetBet	Pizzorno Environnement	Rémanence	Ville de Nice
Paris Saint-Germain	(France) Laurent Blanc	(Brazil) Thiago Silva	Nike	Fly Emirates	Ooredoo	QNB	None
Reims	(France) Olivier Guégan	(France) Mickaël Tacalfred	Hummel	Sanei Ascenseurs, Geodis, Transports Caillot	Epsilon Global	Reims Métropole (H)/Reims (A)	None
Rennes	(France) Philippe Montanier	(France) Romain Danzé	Puma	Samsic, Del Arte, rennes.fr, Association ELA	Blot Immobilier	Armor-Lux	Bretagne Structures
Saint-Étienne	(France) Christophe Galtier	(France) Loïc Perrin	Adidas	Winamax, Conseil départemental de la Loire	BewellConnect	MARKAL	Loire, Saint-Étienne Métropole, Rapid CroQ'
Toulouse	(France) Dominique Arribagé	(Colombia) Abel Aguilar	Kappa	Triangle Intérim, LP Promotion	Newrest	Prévoir Assurances	So Toulouse, Natur House

=== Managerial changes ===
Team	Outgoing manager	Manner of departure	Date of vacancy	Position in table	Replaced by	Date of appointment
Marseille	(France) José Anigo	Resigned	17 May 2014	Pre-season	(Argentina) Marcelo Bielsa	21 May 2014
Bastia	(France) Frédéric Hantz	End of contract	17 May 2014	Pre-season	(France) Claude Makélélé	24 May 2014
Bordeaux	(France) Francis Gillot	End of contract	17 May 2014	Pre-season	(France) Willy Sagnol	23 May 2014
Lorient	(France) Christian Gourcuff	End of contract	17 May 2014	Pre-season	(France) Sylvain Ripoll	25 May 2014
Monaco	(Italy) Claudio Ranieri	End of contract	17 May 2014	Pre-season	(Portugal) Leonardo Jardim	6 June 2014
Lyon	(France) Rémi Garde	End of contract	21 May 2014	Pre-season	(France) Hubert Fournier	23 May 2014
Reims	(France) Hubert Fournier	Signed by Olympique Lyonnais	23 May 2014	Pre-season	(France) Jean-Luc Vasseur	13 June 2014
Bastia	(France) Claude Makélélé	Sacked	3 November 2014	19th	(France) Ghislain Printant	27 November 2014
Toulouse	(France) Alain Casanova	Sacked	16 March 2015	18th	(France) Dominique Arribagé	16 March 2015
Reims	(France) Jean-Luc Vasseur	Sacked	8 April 2015	16th	(France) Olivier Guégan	8 April 2015

== League table ==
Pos	Team	Pld	W	D	L	GF	GA	GD	Pts	Qualification or relegation
1	Paris Saint-Germain (C)	38	24	11	3	83	36	+47	83	Qualification for the Champions League group stage
2	Lyon	38	22	9	7	72	33	+39	75	Qualification for the Champions League group stage
3	Monaco	38	20	11	7	51	26	+25	71	Qualification for the Champions League third qualifying round
4	Marseille	38	21	6	11	76	42	+34	69	Qualification for the Europa League group stage
5	Saint-Étienne	38	19	12	7	51	30	+21	69	Qualification for the Europa League third qualifying round (Note: Since winners of the 2014–15 Coupe de la Ligue, Paris Saint-Germain, qualified for European competition based on their league position, the spot awarded to the Coupe de la Ligue winner (Europa League third qualifying round) is passed to the next best team in the table not already qualified for any European competition (in this case, the fifth-placed team).)
6	Bordeaux	38	17	12	9	47	44	+3	63	Qualification for the Europa League third qualifying round
7	Montpellier	38	16	8	14	46	39	+7	56	
8	Lille	38	16	8	14	43	42	+1	56	
9	Rennes	38	13	11	14	35	42	−7	50	
10	Guingamp	38	15	4	19	41	55	−14	49	
11	Nice	38	13	9	16	44	53	−9	48	
12	Bastia	38	12	11	15	37	46	−9	47	
13	Caen	38	12	10	16	54	55	−1	46	
14	Nantes	38	11	12	15	29	40	−11	45	
15	Reims	38	12	8	18	47	66	−19	44	
16	Lorient	38	12	7	19	44	50	−6	43	
17	Toulouse	38	12	6	20	43	64	−21	42	
18	Evian (R)	38	11	4	23	41	62	−21	37	Relegation to Ligue 2
19	Metz (R)	38	7	9	22	31	61	−30	30	Relegation to Ligue 2
20	Lens (Note: It was announced on 29 January 2015 that Lens' promotion from Ligue 2 at the end of the 2013–14 season has been ruled invalid, and will thus be automatically relegated to Ligue 2 for the 2015–16 season, regardless of where the team place this season. It has been confirmed by the French Football Federation that the decision of the Administrative Court of Besançon will be appealed.) (D, R)	38	7	8	23	32	61	−29	29	Relegation to Ligue 2

Source: Ligue 1
Rules for classification: 1) points; 2) goal difference; 3) number of goals scored
(C) Champions; (D) Disqualified; (R) Relegated

== Results ==
Home \ Away	BAS	BOR	CAE	EVI	GUI	RCL	LIL	LOR	OL	OM	MET	ASM	MHS	NAN	NIC	PSG	REI	REN	STE	TFC
Bastia		0–0	1–1	1–2	0–0	1–1	2–1	0–2	0–0	3–3	2–0	1–3	2–0	0–0	2–1	4–2	1–2	2–0	1–0	1–0
Bordeaux	1–1		1–1	2–1	1–1	2–1	1–0	3–2	0–5	1–0	1–1	4–1	2–1	2–1	1–2	3–2	1–1	2–1	1–0	2–1
Caen	1–1	1–2		3–2	0–2	4–1	0–1	2–1	3–0	1–2	0–0	0–3	1–1	1–2	2–3	0–2	4–1	0–1	1–0	2–0
Evian	1–2	0–1	0–3		2–0	2–1	0–1	1–0	2–3	1–3	3–0	1–3	1–0	0–2	1–0	0–0	2–3	1–1	1–2	1–0
Guingamp	1–0	2–1	5–1	1–1		2–0	0–1	3–2	1–3	0–1	0–1	1–0	0–2	0–1	2–7	1–0	2–0	0–1	0–2	2–1
Lens	1–1	1–2	0–0	0–2	0–1		1–1	0–0	0–2	0–4	2–0	0–3	0–1	1–0	2–0	1–3	4–2	0–1	0–1	1–0
Lille	1–0	2–0	1–0	1–0	1–2	3–1		2–0	2–1	0–4	0–0	0–1	0–0	2–0	0–0	1–1	3–1	3–0	1–1	3–0
Lorient	2–0	0–0	2–1	0–2	4–0	1–0	1–0		1–1	1–1	3–1	0–1	0–0	1–2	0–0	1–2	0–1	0–3	0–1	0–1
Lyon	2–0	1–1	3–0	2–0	3–1	0–1	3–0	4–0		1–0	2–0	2–1	5–1	1–0	1–2	1–1	2–1	2–0	2–2	3–0
Marseille	3–0	3–1	2–3	1–0	2–1	2–1	2–1	3–5	0–0		3–1	2–1	0–2	2–0	4–0	2–3	2–2	3–0	2–1	2–0
Metz	3–1	0–0	3–2	1–2	0–2	3–1	1–4	0–4	2–1	0–2		0–1	2–3	1–1	0–0	2–3	3–0	0–0	2–3	3–2
Monaco	3–0	0–0	2–2	2–0	1–0	2–0	1–1	1–2	0–0	1–0	2–0		0–0	1–0	0–1	0–0	1–1	1–1	1–1	4–1
Montpellier	3–1	0–1	1–0	2–0	2–1	3–3	1–2	1–0	1–5	2–1	2–0	0–1		4–0	2–1	1–2	3–1	0–0	0–2	2–0
Nantes	0–2	2–1	1–2	2–1	1–0	1–0	1–1	1–1	1–1	1–0	0–0	0–1	1–0		2–1	0–2	1–1	1–1	0–0	1–2
Nice	0–1	1–3	1–1	2–2	1–2	2–1	1–0	3–1	1–3	2–1	1–0	0–1	1–1	0–0		1–3	0–0	1–2	0–0	3–2
Paris SG	2–0	3–0	2–2	4–2	6–0	4–1	6–1	3–1	1–1	2–0	3–1	1–1	0–0	2–1	1–0		3–2	1–0	5–0	3–1
Reims	2–1	1–0	0–2	3–2	2–3	0–0	2–0	1–3	2–4	0–5	0–0	1–3	1–0	3–1	0–1	2–2		1–0	1–2	2–0
Rennes	0–1	1–1	1–4	6–2	1–0	2–0	2–0	1–0	0–1	1–1	1–0	2–0	0–4	0–0	2–1	1–1	1–3		0–0	0–3
Saint-Étienne	1–0	1–1	1–0	3–0	2–1	3–3	2–0	2–0	3–0	2–2	1–0	1–1	1–0	1–0	5–0	0–1	3–1	0–0		0–1
Toulouse	1–1	2–1	3–3	1–0	1–1	0–2	3–2	2–3	2–1	1–6	3–0	0–2	1–0	1–1	2–3	1–1	1–0	2–1	1–1	

Source: Ligue 1
Legend: Blue = home team win; Yellow = draw; Red = away team win.

== Season statistics ==
=== Top goalscorers ===
Rank	Player	Club	Goals
1	(France) Alexandre Lacazette	Lyon	27
2	(France) André-Pierre Gignac	Marseille	21
3	(Sweden) Zlatan Ibrahimović	Paris Saint-Germain	19
4	(Uruguay) Edinson Cavani	Paris Saint Germain	18
5	(Guadeloupe) Claudio Beauvue	Guingamp	17
5	(Ivory Coast) Max Gradel	Saint-Étienne	17
7	(Uruguay) Diego Rolan	Bordeaux	15
8	(France) Wissam Ben Yedder	Toulouse	14
9	(France) Nabil Fekir	Lyon	13
10	(Ghana) Jordan Ayew	Lorient	12

Source: Official Goalscorers' Standings

=== Hat-tricks ===
Player	Club	Against	Result	Date
(Sweden) Zlatan Ibrahimović	Paris Saint-Germain	Saint-Étienne	5–0 (H)	31 August 2014
(France) Alexandre Lacazette	Lyon	Lille	3–0 (H)	5 October 2014
(Brazil) Carlos Eduardo^{5}	Nice	Guingamp	7–2 (H)	26 October 2014
(Paraguay) Lucas Barrios	Montpellier	Metz	3–2 (H)	17 January 2015
(Belgium) Divock Origi	Lille	Rennes	3–0 (H)	15 March 2015
(Sweden) Zlatan Ibrahimović	Paris Saint-Germain	Lorient	3–1 (H)	20 March 2015
(Mali) Modibo Maïga	Metz	Toulouse	3–2 (H)	4 April 2015
(Argentina) Ezequiel Lavezzi	Paris Saint-Germain	Lille	6–1 (H)	25 April 2015
(Uruguay) Edinson Cavani	Paris Saint-Germain	Guingamp	6–0 (H)	8 May 2015

^{5} Player scored five goals

== Awards ==
Award	Winner	Club
Player of the Season	(France) Alexandre Lacazette	Lyon
Young Player of the Season	(France) Nabil Fekir	Lyon
Goalkeeper of the Season	(France) Steve Mandanda	Marseille
Goal of the Season	(France) Julian Palmieri	Bastia
Manager of the Season	(France) Laurent Blanc	Paris Saint-Germain

Team of the Year
Goalkeeper	(France) Steve Mandanda (Marseille)			
Defenders	(France) Christophe Jallet (Lyon)	(Brazil) David Luiz (Paris Saint-Germain)	(Brazil) Thiago Silva (Paris Saint-Germain)	(Brazil) Maxwell (Paris Saint-Germain)
Midfielders	(Italy) Marco Verratti (Paris Saint-Germain)	(Argentina) Javier Pastore (Paris Saint-Germain)		(France) Nabil Fekir (Lyon)
Forwards	(France) Dimitri Payet (Marseille)	(Sweden) Zlatan Ibrahimović (Paris Saint-Germain)		(France) Alexandre Lacazette (Lyon)

== Attendances ==
No.	Club	Average attendance	Change	Highest
1	Olympique de Marseille	53,130	39.3%	65,148
2	Paris Saint-Germain FC	45,789	0.8%	46,683
3	LOSC	36,552	-5.5%	45,771
4	Olympique lyonnais	34,949	1.6%	39,961
5	AS Saint-Étienne	32,256	5.4%	39,147
6	FC Nantes	25,985	-7.8%	36,022
7	Girondins de Bordeaux	23,463	24.6%	40,275
8	Stade rennais	20,125	3.1%	27,194
9	FC Metz	18,673	34.2%	24,998
10	OGC Nice	18,293	-20.2%	25,407
11	RC Lens	17,205	-44.5%	70,785
12	SM Caen	16,991	57.4%	20,501
13	Toulouse FC	15,689	4.6%	20,762
14	EA Guingamp	14,848	-1.0%	17,636
15	Stade de Reims	14,091	-9.5%	19,270
16	FC Lorient	13,649	-10.0%	16,143
17	MHSC	12,860	-12.4%	27,930
18	SC Bastia	12,129	-6.2%	15,534
19	Évian Thonon Gaillard FC	10,514	-3.7%	14,600
20	AS Monaco	7,820	-7.3%	13,960
