= Alves =

Alves is a surname that appears to originate both from Portugal and Scotland (in Scotland where a variation of the name can appear as Alvis). It is debatable whether the surname appeared first in one country or the other, since it is more prevalent in Portugal, but registered as far back as the 13th century in the church records at Alves, Moray, Northern Scotland. If from Portugal, it will have originated from the Germanic patronym son of Álvaro (Alvar, Alvarus).

Notable people with the surname include:

- Adriana Alves (actress) (born 1976), Brazilian actress
- Adriana Alves (sprinter) (born 1995), Angolan sprinter
- Adriano Alves (born 1977), Brazilian footballer
- Afonso Alves (born 1981), Brazilian footballer
- Alecsander Alves, birth name of Dinho (1971–1996), Brazilian singer and songwriter, and vocalist of Mamonas Assassinas
- Anastácio Alves (born 1963), missing Madeiran Roman Catholic priest
- Bruno Alves (born 1981), Portuguese footballer
- Camila Alves (born 1982), Brazilian model and television performer
- Carlos Alberto Alves Garcia (born 1982), Portuguese footballer known as "Carlitos"
- Castro Alves (1847–1871), Brazilian poet and playwright
- Dani Alves (born 1983), Brazilian footballer
- Daniel Miguel Alves Gomes (born 1983), Portuguese footballer known as "Danny"
- Diego Alves (born 1985), Brazilian footballer
- Duarte Alves (born 1991), Portuguese politician
- Feliciano Alves Diniz Filho (born 1956), Brazilian footballer
- Flavio Alves (born 1969), Brazilian film producer, director, and screenwriter
- Francisco Alves (singer) (1898–1952), Brazilian singer
- Francisco Alves (water polo) (1923–1991), Portuguese water polo player
- Jessica Alves (born 1983), Brazilian-British television personality
- Jéssika Alves (born 1991), Brazilian actress
- João Alves (bishop) (1925–2013), Portuguese Roman Catholic bishop
- João Alves de Assis Silva (born 1987), Brazilian footballer known as "Jô"
- Jock Alves (c. 1909–1979), Rhodesian physician and politician
- Juliana Alves (born 1982), Brazilian actress
- Lennox Alves (born 1956), Guyanese cricketer
- Lúcia Alves (born 1997), Portuguese footballer
- Lúcia Alves (actress) (1948–2025), Brazilian actress
- Magno Alves (born 1976), Brazilian footballer
- Malévola Alves (born 2004), Brazilian influencer
- Maria Domingas Alves (born 1959), East Timorese politician
- Maria Thereza Alves (born 1961), Brazilian-born artist and activist
- Maurício Alves Peruchi (1990–2014), Brazilian footballer
- Monique Alves Frankenhuis (1962–1994), Brazilian actress
- Regiane Alves (born 1978), Brazilian actress
- Robert Alves (1745–1794), Scottish poet and prose writer
- Sofia Alves (born 1973), Portuguese actress
- Tânia Alves (born 1953), Brazilian actress, dancer, singer and businesswoman
- Thiago Alves (disambiguation)
- Ugleno Alves (born 1994), Brazilian politician

== See also ==
- Alves da Silva
- Alves dos Santos
- Alvis (disambiguation) (surname)
- Alviss
- De Alwis (surname)
