= 1994 in Brazil =

Events in the year 1994 in Brazil.

== Incumbents ==
=== Federal government ===
- President: Itamar Franco
- Vice President: vacant

=== Governors ===
- Acre: Vacant
- Alagoas: Geraldo Bulhões
- Amapa: Annibal Barcellos (until 31 December)
- Amazonas: Gilberto Mestrinho
- Bahia:
  - Antônio Carlos Magalhães (until 2 April)
  - Ruy Trindade (2 April-2 May)
  - Antônio Imbassahy (from 2 May)
- Ceará:
  - Ciro Gomes (until 8 September)
  - Francisco de Barros (8 September-9 October)
  - Francisco Aguiar (from 9 October)
- Espírito Santo: Albuíno Cunha de Azeredo
- Goiás:
  - Iris Rezende (until 2 April)
  - Agenor Rezende (from 2 April)
- Maranhão:
  - Edison Lobão (until 2 April)
  - José de Ribamar Fiquene (from 2 April)
- Mato Grosso: Jaime Campos
- Mato Grosso do Sul: Pedro Pedrossian
- Minas Gerais: Hélio Garcia
- Pará:
  - Jader Barbalho (until 2 April)
  - Carlos Santos (from 2 April)
- Paraíba:
  - Ronaldo Cunha Lima (until 2 April)
  - Cícero de Lucena (from 2 April)
- Paraná:
  - Roberto Requião (until 2 April)
  - Mário Pereira (from 2 April)
- Pernambuco: Joaquim Francisco Cavalcanti
- Piauí:
  - Freitas Neto (until 2 April)
  - Guilherme Melo (from 2 April)
- Rio de Janeiro:
  - Leonel Brizola (until 2 April)
  - Nilo Batista (from 2 April)
- Rio Grande do Norte:
  - José Agripino Maia (until 2 April)
  - Vivaldo Costa (from 2 April)
- Rio Grande do Sul: Alceu de Deus Collares
- Rondônia: Oswaldo Piana Filho
- Roraima: Ottomar de Sousa Pinto
- Santa Catarina:
  - Vilson Kleinübing (until 6 April)
  - Antônio Carlos Konder Reis (from 6 April)
- São Paulo: Luís Antônio Fleury Filho
- Sergipe: João Alves Filho
- Tocantins: Moisés Nogueira Avelino

=== Vice governors ===
- Acre: Vacant
- Alagoas: Francisco Roberto Holanda de Melo
- Amapá: Ronaldo Pinheiro Borges
- Amazonas: Francisco Garcia Rodrigues
- Bahia:
  - Paulo Souto (until 2 April)
  - Rosalvo Barbosa Romeo (from 2 May)
- Ceará:
  - Lúcio Gonçalo de Alcântara (until 16 September)
  - Vacant thereafter (from 16 September)
- Espírito Santo: Adelson Antônio Salvador
- Goiás:
  - Luís Alberto Maguito Vilela (until 2 April)
  - Vacant thereafter (from 2 April)
- Maranhão:
  - José de Ribamar Fiquene (until 2 April)
  - Vacant thereafter (from 2 April)
- Mato Grosso: Osvaldo Roberto Sobrinho
- Mato Grosso do Sul: Ary Rigo
- Minas Gerais: Arlindo Porto Neto
- Pará:
  - Carlos José Oliveira Santos (until 2 April)
  - Vacant thereafter (from 2 April)
- Paraíba:
  - Cícero Lucena Filho (until 2 April)
  - Vacant thereafter (from 2 April)
- Paraná:
  - Mario Pereira (until 2 April)
  - Vacant thereafter (from 2 April)
- Pernambuco: Carlos Roberto Guerra Fontes
- Piauí:
  - Guilherme Cavalcante de Melo (until 2 April)
  - Vacant thereafter (from 2 April)
- Rio de Janeiro:
  - Nilo Batista (until 2 April)
  - Vacant thereafter (from 2 April)
- Rio Grande do Norte:
  - Vivaldo Costa (until 2 April)
  - Vacant thereafter (from 2 April)
- Rio Grande do Sul: João Gilberto Lucas Coelho
- Rondônia: Assis Canuto
- Roraima: Antônio Airton Oliveira Dias
- Santa Catarina:
  - Antônio Carlos Konder Reis (until 2 April)
  - Vacant thereafter (from 2 April)
- São Paulo: Aloysio Nunes
- Sergipe: José Carlos Mesquita Teixeira
- Tocantins: Paulo Sidnei Antunes

== Events ==
=== January ===
- 7 January: Paulo César Farias, the treasurer of Fernando Collor de Mello's electoral campaign, is sentenced to four years in prison for tax evasion.

=== February ===
- 28 February: The Unidade Real de Valor is launched, which is the equivalent to 2,750 reals.

=== March ===
- 3 March: Fernando Henrique Cardoso leaves Itamar Franco's Ministry of Finance to run for President of the Republic.

=== May ===
- 1 May: Three time Formula One World Champion, Ayrton Senna is killed in a crash during the 1994 San Marino Grand Prix.

=== July ===
- 1 July: The real replaces the cruzeiro real as Brazil's national currency.
- 17 July: Brazil defeats Italy 3–2 on penalties to win the 1994 FIFA World Cup. Brazil claims their fourth FIFA World Cup trophy.

=== August ===
- 5 August: Argentina, Brazil, Paraguay, and Uruguay decide in Buenos Aires to create a free trade zone between MERCOSUR and Bolivia.

=== October ===
- 3 October: Fernando Henrique Cardoso is elected Brazil's 34th president, defeating Luiz Inácio Lula da Silva in the country's presidential election.

=== December ===
- 7 December: The trial of former President Fernando Collor de Mello and the treasurer of the electoral campaign, Paulo César Farias, begins at the Supreme Federal Court.
- 12 December: The Supreme Federal Court acquits former President of Brazil, Fernando Collor de Mello, and treasurer Paulo César Farias, on charges of passive corruption, due to a lack of evidence.
- 13 December: The Supreme Federal Court sentences treasurer Paulo César Farias to 7 years in prison for misrepresentation.

== Births ==
- 31 March: Felipe Colares, mixed martial artist (d. 2023)
- 14 May: Marquinhos, professional footballer
- 30 June: Neto Karfan, politician
- 24 October: Ugleno Alves, politician

== Deaths ==
=== January ===
- 6 January: Cláudia Magno, actress and dancer (b. 1958)

=== April ===
- 18 April: Dener Augusto de Sousa, footballer (b. 1971)

=== May ===
- 1 May: Ayrton Senna, racing driver (b. 1960)

=== July ===
- 10 July: Lélia Gonzalez, anthropologist and human rights activist (b. 1935)
- 29 July: Mussum, actor and musician (b. 1941)

=== December ===
- 8 December: Tom Jobim, composer and singer (b.1927)
- 19 December: Pedro Collor de Mello, businessman and brother of former President Fernando Collor de Mello (b. 1952)

== See also ==
- 1994 in Brazilian football
- 1994 in Brazilian television
