= De Alwis =

De Alwis ද අල්විස්
- Pronunciation: da Alvis
- Language: Sinhala

Origin
- Region of origin: Sri Lanka

Other names
- Derived: Alves

De Alwis (Sinhala: ද අල්විස්, romanized: da Alvis) is a Sinhalese surname derived from the Portuguese surname Alves.

== Notable people ==
- Albert L. De Alwis Seneviratne, Ceylonese politician
- Amali de Alwis (born 1980), British executive
- Anandatissa de Alwis (1919–1996), Sri Lankan politician
- Anuk de Alwis (born 1991), Sri Lankan cricketer
- Ashanthi De Alwis, Sri Lankan musician
- Charles Alwis Hewavitharana, Sri Lankan Sinhala independence activist and physician
- Guy de Alwis (1959–2013), Sri Lankan cricketer
- James De Alwis (1823–1878), Ceylonese politician
- Lakshman de Alwis (1940–2008), Sri Lankan athlete
- Lanka de Alwis, Sri Lankan cricketer
- Malathi de Alwis, Sri Lankan anthropologist
- Neal de Alwis (1914–?), Ceylonese politician
- Padmalal de Alwis, Sri Lankan politician
- Prasantha Lal De Alwis, Sri Lankan lawyer
- Premakeerthi de Alwis (1947–1989), Sri Lankan broadcaster
- Sacha De Alwis (born 1992), Sri Lankan cricketer
- Stanley de Alwis (1936–2019), Ceylonese cricketer
- Susantha De Alwis (died 2008), Sri Lankan diplomat
- Suwini de Alwis (born 1975), Sri Lankan cricketer
- William de Alwis (1842–1916), Ceylonese artist
