= Francisco Alves =

Francisco Alves may refer to: jogador de futsal

== People ==
- Francisco Alves Albino (1912–1993), Portuguese footballer
- Francisco Alves (water polo) (1923–1991), Portuguese water polo player
- Francisco Alves Ataíde, Governor of Espírito Santo
- Francisco Alves (singer) (1898–1952), Brazilian singer

== Places ==
- Francisco Alves, Paraná, a municipality in Brazil
