= 2014–15 Paris Saint-Germain FC season =

45th season in existence of Paris Saint-Germain

Paris Saint-Germain
2014–15 season
- President: Nasser Al-Khelaifi
- Head coach: Laurent Blanc
- Stadium: Parc des Princes
- Ligue 1: 1st
- Coupe de France: Winners
- Coupe de la Ligue: Winners
- Trophée des Champions: Winners
- UEFA Champions League: Quarter-finals
- Top goalscorer: League: Zlatan Ibrahimović (19); All: Edinson Cavani (31)
- Average home league attendance: 45,758
Home colours	Away colours	Third colours

The 2014–15 season was Paris Saint-Germain Football Club's 45th in existence and their 42nd in the top-flight of French football. The team competed in Ligue 1, the Coupe de France, the Coupe de la Ligue, the Trophée des Champions and the UEFA Champions League.

== Summary ==
Just weeks after winning a first trophy of the season in Beijing, with the 2014 Trophée des Champions and the 2–0 win over Guingamp, PSG were struggling to impose themselves on Ligue 1. With three wins and five draws, the club was sitting five points adrift of Marseille after eight matches (19 points for Marseille and 14 for PSG).

After something of a World Cup hangover for the club's international stars, Les Rouge-et-Bleu really hit their stride in October, and especially November. Lens (1-3), Bordeaux (3–0), Lorient (1–2), Marseille (2–0), Metz (2–3) and Nice (1–0) were all defeated by Laurent Blanc's men. PSG moved second on the ladder, just one point behind Marseille and six ahead of Lyon. PSG were on their way, but December saw a first loss of the campaign to Guingamp (1–0) as the capital club finished the first half of the season in third place, three points adrift of Marseille.

The start of January saw PSG make a successful start to the Coupe de France, eliminating Montpellier 3–0. After a surprise 4–2 loss to Bastia in the league, PSG recorded a series of positive results which saw them fighting on all four fronts. In the UEFA Champions League, Thiago Silva and company wrote one of the most spectacular pages in the club's history: after a 1–1 home draw with Chelsea in the first leg of the round of 16, Les Parisiens produced an heroic qualification at Stamford Bridge, going through on the away goals rule. A prestigious victory over Marseille (3–2) and a win in the 2015 Coupe de la Ligue Final against Bastia (4–0) followed before PSG were eliminated from the Champions League by future finalists Barcelona. PSG bounced back by booking their place in the final of the Coupe de France with a resounding semi-final win against Saint-Étienne (4–0) and kept hopes alive of an unprecedented quadruple.

Fighting tooth and nail with Lyon in the championship, PSG set a cracking pace with a series of big wins (6–1 against Lille, 3–1 against Metz, 2–0 against Nantes and 6–0 against Guingamp). PSG were in unstoppable form and the pressure told as Lyon cracked against Caen, going down 3–0 in matchweek 36. In the end, it was at the Stade de la Mosson that PSG officially secured a fifth French championship in their history and the third in a row. The capital club then left their mark on French football by defeating Auxerre 1–0 with a goal from Edinson Cavani in the 2015 Coupe de France Final at the Stade de France to claim an unprecedented domestic quadruple.

== Players ==
Players, transfers, appearances and goals - 2014/2015 season.

=== First-team squad ===
Note: Flags indicate national team as defined under FIFA eligibility rules; some limited exceptions apply. Players may hold more than one non-FIFA nationality.

No.	Pos.	Nation	Player
1	GK	FRA	Nicolas Douchez
2	DF	BRA	Thiago Silva (captain)
4	MF	FRA	Yohan Cabaye
5	DF	BRA	Marquinhos
6	DF	FRA	Zoumana Camara
7	MF	BRA	Lucas Moura
8	MF	ITA	Thiago Motta
9	FW	URU	Edinson Cavani
10	FW	SWE	Zlatan Ibrahimović
14	MF	FRA	Blaise Matuidi
15	FW	FRA	Jean-Christophe Bahebeck

No.	Pos.	Nation	Player
16	GK	FRA	Mike Maignan
17	DF	BRA	Maxwell
21	DF	FRA	Lucas Digne
22	FW	ARG	Ezequiel Lavezzi
23	DF	NED	Gregory van der Wiel
24	MF	ITA	Marco Verratti
25	MF	FRA	Adrien Rabiot
27	MF	ARG	Javier Pastore
30	GK	ITA	Salvatore Sirigu
32	DF	BRA	David Luiz
40	GK	FRA	Mory Diaw

=== In on loan ===
Note: Flags indicate national team as defined under FIFA eligibility rules; some limited exceptions apply. Players may hold more than one non-FIFA nationality.

No.	Pos.	Nation	Player
19	DF	CIV	Serge Aurier (from Toulouse)

=== Out on loan ===
Note: Flags indicate national team as defined under FIFA eligibility rules; some limited exceptions apply. Players may hold more than one non-FIFA nationality.

No.	Pos.	Nation	Player
—	GK	FRA	Alphonse Areola (at Bastia)
—	MF	FRA	Romain Habran (at Sochaux)
—	DF	FRA	Jordan Ikoko (at Le Havre)

No.	Pos.	Nation	Player
—	FW	FRA	Hervin Ongenda (at Bastia)
—	DF	FRA	Youssouf Sabaly (at Evian)

=== Transfers in ===
Note: Flags indicate national team as defined under FIFA eligibility rules; some limited exceptions apply. Players may hold more than one non-FIFA nationality.

No.	Pos.	Nation	Player
—	DF	BRA	David Luiz (from Chelsea) (£50 million)

=== Transfers out ===
Note: Flags indicate national team as defined under FIFA eligibility rules; some limited exceptions apply. Players may hold more than one non-FIFA nationality.

No.	Pos.	Nation	Player
—	DF	BRA	Alex (to Milan)
—	MF	FRA	Kingsley Coman (to Juventus)
—	DF	FRA	Antoine Conte (to Reims)
—	DF	FRA	Christophe Jallet (to Lyon)

No.	Pos.	Nation	Player
—	MF	FRA	Jérémy Ménez (to Milan)
—	FW	HAI	Jean-Eudes Maurice (to Chennaiyin)
—	DF	FRA	Clément Chantôme (to Bordeaux)

== Statistics ==
=== Appearances and goals ===
No.	Pos	Nat	Player	Total		Ligue 1		Coupe de France		Coupe de la Ligue		Trophée des Champions		Champions League	
No.	Pos	Nat	Player	Apps	Goals	Apps	Goals	Apps	Goals	Apps	Goals	Apps	Goals	Apps	Goals
Goalkeepers
1	GK	(France) FRA	Nicolas Douchez	15	0	4+1	0	6	0	4	0	0	0	0	0
16	GK	(France) FRA	Mike Maignan	0	0	0	0	0	0	0	0	0	0	0	0
30	GK	(Italy) ITA	Salvatore Sirigu	45	0	34	0	0	0	0	0	1	0	10	0
40	GK	(France) FRA	Mory Diaw	0	0	0	0	0	0	0	0	0	0	0	0
Defenders
2	DF	(Brazil) BRA	Thiago Silva	40	2	26	1	5	0	3	0	0	0	6	1
5	DF	(Brazil) BRA	Marquinhos	42	2	21+4	2	5	0	4	0	1	0	7	0
6	DF	(France) FRA	Zoumana Camara	10	1	6+2	1	1	0	0	0	1	0	0	0
17	DF	(Brazil) BRA	Maxwell	40	4	24+2	3	1+1	0	2	1	0	0	10	0
19	DF	(Ivory Coast) CIV	Serge Aurier	16	1	12+2	0	0	0	2	1	0	0	0	0
21	DF	(France) FRA	Lucas Digne	24	0	14+1	0	5	0	2	0	1	0	0+1	0
23	DF	(Netherlands) NED	Gregory van der Wiel	41	2	22+3	1	3+2	0	0	0	1	0	9+1	1
32	DF	(Brazil) BRA	David Luiz	45	5	26+2	2	4	1	3	0	0	0	9+1	2
38	DF	(France) FRA	Presnel Kimpembe	1	0	0+1	0	0	0	0	0	0	0	0	0
Midfielders
4	MF	(France) FRA	Yohan Cabaye	36	2	13+11	1	4	1	1+2	0	0	0	2+3	0
7	MF	(Brazil) BRA	Lucas Moura	46	7	22+7	7	2+2	0	3+1	0	0+1	0	5+3	0
8	MF	(Italy) ITA	Thiago Motta	38	1	25+2	0	2	1	2	0	1	0	6	0
14	MF	(France) FRA	Blaise Matuidi	53	5	25+9	4	3+2	0	3+1	0	0	0	10	1
24	MF	(Italy) ITA	Marco Verratti	49	3	28+4	2	3+3	0	3	0	1	0	7	1
25	MF	(France) FRA	Adrien Rabiot	33	4	10+11	4	5	0	2+1	0	0	0	2+2	0
27	MF	(Argentina) ARG	Javier Pastore	51	6	31+3	5	3+1	1	2	0	1	0	7+3	0
34	MF	(France) FRA	Jeremi Kimmakon	1	0	0	0	0	0	0+1	0	0	0	0	0
Forwards
9	FW	(Uruguay) URU	Edinson Cavani	53	31	30+5	18	4	4	2+1	3	0+1	0	10	6
10	FW	(Sweden) SWE	Zlatan Ibrahimović	37	30	23+1	19	3	4	3	3	1	2	6	2
15	FW	(France) FRA	Jean-Christophe Bahebeck	24	3	3+12	2	2+2	0	0+1	1	1	0	0+3	0
22	FW	(Argentina) ARG	Ezequiel Lavezzi	47	9	19+12	8	4+1	1	2+1	0	0	0	4+4	0
29	FW	(France) FRA	Jean-Kévin Augustin	1	0	0	0	0+1	0	0	0	0	0	0	0
Players transferred out during the season
20	MF	(France) FRA	Clément Chantôme	12	1	0+6	0	1	1	1	0	0+1	0	0+3	0
35	FW	(France) FRA	Hervin Ongenda	1	0	0	0	0	0	0	0	0+1	0	0	0

Last updated: 30 May 2015
Source: Competitions

== Competitions ==
=== Trophée des Champions ===
2 August 2014 Final	Paris Saint-Germain	2–0	Guingamp	Beijing, China
	Ibrahimović 9', 20' (pen.)	Report		Stadium: Workers Stadium; Attendance: 39,752

=== Ligue 1 ===
==== League table ====
Pos	Team	Pld	W	D	L	GF	GA	GD	Pts	Qualification or relegation
1	Paris Saint-Germain (C)	38	24	11	3	83	36	+47	83	Qualification for the Champions League group stage
2	Lyon	38	22	9	7	72	33	+39	75	Qualification for the Champions League group stage
3	Monaco	38	20	11	7	51	26	+25	71	Qualification for the Champions League third qualifying round
4	Marseille	38	21	6	11	76	42	+34	69	Qualification for the Europa League group stage
5	Saint-Étienne	38	19	12	7	51	30	+21	69	Qualification for the Europa League third qualifying round (Note: Since winners of the 2014–15 Coupe de la Ligue, Paris Saint-Germain, qualified for European competition based on their league position, the spot awarded to the Coupe de la Ligue winner (Europa League third qualifying round) is passed to the next best team in the table not already qualified for any European competition (in this case, the fifth-placed team).)

Source: Ligue 1
Rules for classification: 1) points; 2) goal difference; 3) number of goals scored
(C) Champions

==== Results summary ====
Overall								Home						Away					
Pld	W	D	L	GF	GA	GD	Pts	W	D	L	GF	GA	GD	W	D	L	GF	GA	GD
38	24	11	3	83	36	+47	83	15	4	0	52	14	+38	9	7	3	31	22	+9

Source: LFP.fr

==== Results by round ====
Round	1	2	3	4	5	6	7	8	9	10	11	12	13	14	15	16	17	18	19	20	21	22	23	24	25	26	27	28	29	30	31	32	33	34	35	36	37	38
Ground	A	H	A	H	A	H	A	A	H	A	H	A	H	A	H	A	H	A	H	A	H	A	H	A	H	H	A	H	A	H	A	H	A	H	A	H	A	H
Result	D	W	D	W	D	D	W	D	D	W	W	W	W	W	W	D	W	L	D	L	W	W	W	D	D	W	D	W	L	W	W	W	W	W	W	W	W	W
Position	11	3	6	2	5	5	4	4	3	2	2	2	2	2	2	2	2	2	3	4	3	3	3	3	3	2	2	2	2	1	1	1	1	1	1	1	1	1

Source: LFP.fr
A = Away; H = Home; W = Win; D = Draw; L = Loss

==== Matches ====
Win Draw Loss

8 August 2014 1	Reims	2–2	Paris Saint-Germain	Reims
	Oniangue 22'; Devaux 34'	Report	Ibrahimović 7', 63'	Stadium: Stade Auguste Delaune; Attendance: 18,540

16 August 2014 2	Paris Saint-Germain	2–0	Bastia	Paris
	Lucas 26'; Cavani 57'	Report		Stadium: Parc des Princes; Attendance: 45,258

22 August 2014 3	Evian	0–0	Paris Saint-Germain	Annecy
		Report		Stadium: Parc des Sports; Attendance: 14,600

31 August 2014 4	Paris Saint-Germain	5–0	Saint-Étienne	Paris
	Ruffier 24' (o.g.); Ibrahimović 41', 63', 72'; Cavani 65'	Report		Stadium: Parc des Princes; Attendance: 46,088

13 September 2014 5	Rennes	1–1	Paris Saint-Germain	Rennes
	Ntep 55'	Report	Camara 43'	Stadium: Stade de la Route de Lorient; Attendance: 27,290

21 September 2014 6	Paris Saint-Germain	1–1	Lyon	Paris
	Cavani 20'	Report	Umtiti 84'	Stadium: Parc des Princes; Attendance: 45,428

24 September 2014 7	Caen	0–2	Paris Saint-Germain	Caen
		Report	Lucas 18'; Marquinhos 57'	Stadium: Stade Michel d'Ornano; Attendance: 19,998

27 September 2014 8	Toulouse	1–1	Paris Saint-Germain	Toulouse
	Ben Yedder 8'	Report	Bahebeck 33'	Stadium: Stadium Municipal; Attendance: 20,762

5 October 2014 9	Paris Saint-Germain	1–1	Monaco	Paris
	Lucas 71'	Report	Martial 90+2'	Stadium: Parc des Princes; Attendance: 45,308

17 October 2014 10	Lens	1–3	Paris Saint-Germain	Saint-Denis
	Coulibaly 10'	Report	Cabaye 28'; Maxwell 34'; Cavani 55' (pen.)	Stadium: Stade de France; Attendance: 70,785

25 October 2014 11	Paris Saint-Germain	3–0	Bordeaux	Paris
	Lucas 45+3' (pen.), 50' (pen.); Lavezzi 81'	Report		Stadium: Parc des Princes; Attendance: 46,077

1 November 2014 12	Lorient	1–2	Paris Saint-Germain	Lorient
	Guerreiro 42'	Report	Cavani 60'; Bahebeck 69'	Stadium: Stade du Moustoir; Attendance: 15,652

9 November 2014 13	Paris Saint-Germain	2–0	Marseille	Paris
	Lucas 38'; Cavani 85'	Report		Stadium: Parc des Princes; Attendance: 45,961

21 November 2014 14	Metz	2–3	Paris Saint-Germain	Metz
	Maïga 49' (pen.), 53' (pen.)	Report	Pastore 9'; Bussmann 16' (o.g.); Lavezzi 84'	Stadium: Stade Municipal Saint-Symphorien; Attendance: 25,012

29 November 2014 15	Paris Saint-Germain	1–0	Nice	Paris
	Ibrahimović 15' (pen.)	Report		Stadium: Parc des Princes; Attendance: 45,542

3 December 2014 16	Lille	1–1	Paris Saint-Germain	Lille
	Sirigu 42' (o.g.)	Report	Cavani 29'	Stadium: Stade Pierre-Mauroy; Attendance: 45,771

6 December 2014 17	Paris Saint-Germain	2–1	Nantes	Paris
	Ibrahimović 34', 48'	Report	Bedoya 8'	Stadium: Parc des Princes; Attendance: 46,161

14 December 2014 18	Guingamp	1–0	Paris Saint-Germain	Guingamp
	Pied 11'	Report		Stadium: Stade du Roudourou; Attendance: 17,636

20 December 2014 19	Paris Saint-Germain	0–0	Montpellier	Paris
		Report		Stadium: Parc des Princes; Attendance: 46,157

10 January 2015 20	Bastia	4–2	Paris Saint-Germain	Bastia
	Boudebouz 32' (pen.); Modesto 45'; Palmieri 56', 90'	Report	Lucas 10'; Rabiot 20'	Stadium: Stade Armand-Cesari; Attendance: 13,028

18 January 2015 21	Paris Saint-Germain	4–2	Evian	Paris
	David Luiz 30'; Verratti 38'; Pastore 74'; Cavani 89'	Report	Barbosa 14'; Van der Wiel 64' (o.g.)	Stadium: Parc des Princes; Attendance: 45,561

25 January 2015 22	Saint-Étienne	0–1	Paris Saint-Germain	Saint-Étienne
		Report	Ibrahimović 60' (pen.)	Stadium: Stade Geoffroy-Guichard; Attendance: 32,302

30 January 2015 23	Paris Saint-Germain	1–0	Rennes	Paris
	Lavezzi 29'	Report		Stadium: Parc des Princes; Attendance: 44,955

8 February 2015 24	Lyon	1–1	Paris Saint-Germain	Lyon
	N'Jie 31'	Report	Ibrahimović 69' (pen.)	Stadium: Stade de Gerland; Attendance: 37,581

14 February 2015 25	Paris Saint-Germain	2–2	Caen	Paris
	Ibrahimović 2'; Lavezzi 39'	Report	Sala 89'; Bazile 90+2'	Stadium: Parc des Princes; Attendance: 45,571

21 February 2015 26	Paris Saint-Germain	3–1	Toulouse	Paris
	Rabiot 27', 48'; Thiago Silva 74'	Report	Ben Yedder 51'	Stadium: Parc des Princes; Attendance: 45,628

1 March 2015 27	Monaco	0–0	Paris Saint-Germain	Monaco
		Report		Stadium: Stade Louis II; Attendance: 12,065

7 March 2015 28	Paris Saint-Germain	4–1	Lens	Paris
	David Luiz 43'; Ibrahimović 60' (pen.); Matuidi 80'; Pastore 82'	Report	Touzghar 69'	Stadium: Parc des Princes; Attendance: 46,279

15 March 2015 29	Bordeaux	3–2	Paris Saint-Germain	Bordeaux
	Sané 18'; Khazri 70'; Rolán 88'	Report	Ibrahimović 50', 85' (pen.)	Stadium: Stade Chaban-Delmas; Attendance: 32,236

20 March 2015 30	Paris Saint-Germain	3–1	Lorient	Paris
	Ibrahimović 4' (pen.), 82' (pen.), 90+1'	Report	Ayew 67'	Stadium: Parc des Princes; Attendance: 45,705

5 April 2015 31	Marseille	2–3	Paris Saint-Germain	Marseille
	Gignac 30', 43'	Report	Matuidi 35'; Marquinhos 49'; Morel 51' (o.g.)	Stadium: Stade Vélodrome; Attendance: 65,148

18 April 2015 33	Nice	1–3	Paris Saint-Germain	Nice
	Bodmer 45+1'	Report	Pastore 39', 63'; Cavani 69' (pen.)	Stadium: Allianz Riviera; Attendance: 25,145

25 April 2015 34	Paris Saint-Germain	6–1	Lille	Paris
	Maxwell 1'; Cavani 4', 73' (pen.); Lavezzi 28', 44', 77'	Report	Baša 59'	Stadium: Parc des Princes; Attendance: 45,001

28 April 2015 32	Paris Saint-Germain	3–1	Metz	Paris
	Verratti 25'; Cavani 42'; Van der Wiel 77'	Report	Maïga 53'	Stadium: Parc des Princes; Attendance: 46,337

3 May 2015 35	Nantes	0–2	Paris Saint-Germain	Nantes
		Report	Cavani 3'; Matuidi 31'	Stadium: Stade de la Beaujoire; Attendance: 34,088

8 May 2015 36	Paris Saint-Germain	6–0	Guingamp	Paris
	Cavani 2', 52', 70'; Ibrahimović 18', 90' (pen.); Maxwell 56'	Report		Stadium: Parc des Princes; Attendance: 46,683

16 May 2015 37	Montpellier	1–2	Paris Saint-Germain	Montpellier
	Mounier 40'	Report	Matuidi 17'; Lavezzi 25'	Stadium: Stade de la Mosson; Attendance: 27,930

23 May 2015 38	Paris Saint-Germain	3–2	Reims	Paris
	Cavani 30', 84'; Rabiot 45'	Report	Mandi 54'; Kyei 89'	Stadium: Parc des Princes; Attendance: 46,297

=== Coupe de France ===
5 January 2015 Round of 64	Montpellier	0–3	Paris Saint-Germain	Montpellier
		Report	Chantôme 63'; Ibrahimović 79'; Lucas 90+1'	Stadium: Stade de la Mosson; Attendance: 18,000

21 January 2015 Round of 32	Paris Saint-Germain	2–1	Bordeaux	Paris
	Cavani 14'; Pastore 33'	Report	Rolán 46'	Stadium: Parc des Princes; Attendance: 42,000

11 February 2015 Round of 16	Paris Saint-Germain	2–0	Nantes	Paris
	Cavani 19'; Cabaye 34'	Report		Stadium: Parc des Princes; Attendance: 35,000

4 March 2015 Quarter-finals	Paris Saint-Germain	2–0	Monaco	Paris
	David Luiz 3'; Cavani 52'	Report		Stadium: Parc des Princes; Attendance: 45,000

8 April 2015 Semi-finals	Paris Saint-Germain	4–1	Saint-Étienne	Paris
	Ibrahimović 21' (pen.), 81', 90+2'; Lavezzi 60'	Report	Hamouma 25'	Stadium: Parc des Princes; Attendance: 43,000

30 May 2015 Final	Auxerre	0–1	Paris Saint-Germain	Saint-Denis
		Report	Cavani 65'	Stadium: Stade de France; Attendance: 80,000

=== Coupe de la Ligue ===
17 December 2014 Round of 16	Ajaccio	1–3	Paris Saint-Germain	Ajaccio
	Cavalli 27' (pen.)	Report	Cavani 55'; Aurier 80'; Bahebeck 84'	Stadium: Stade François Coty; Attendance: 4,980

13 January 2015 Quarter-finals	Saint-Étienne	0–1	Paris Saint-Germain	Saint-Étienne
		Report	Ibrahimović 72'	Stadium: Stade Geoffroy-Guichard; Attendance: 28,855

3 February 2015 Semi-finals	Lille	0–1	Paris Saint-Germain	Lille
		Report	Maxwell 27'	Stadium: Stade Pierre-Mauroy; Attendance: 41,977

11 April 2015 Final	Bastia	0–4	Paris Saint-Germain	Saint-Denis
		Report	Ibrahimović 21' (pen.), 41'; Cavani 80', 90+1'	Stadium: Stade de France; Attendance: 75,000

=== UEFA Champions League ===
==== Group stage ====
Pos	Team	Pld	W	D	L	GF	GA	GD	Pts	Qualification	BAR	PAR	AJX	APO
1	(Spain) Barcelona	6	5	0	1	15	5	+10	15	Advance to knockout phase	—	3–1	3–1	1–0
2	(France) Paris Saint-Germain	6	4	1	1	10	7	+3	13	Advance to knockout phase	3–2	—	3–1	1–0
3	(Netherlands) Ajax	6	1	2	3	8	10	−2	5	Transfer to Europa League	0–2	1–1	—	4–0
4	(Cyprus) APOEL	6	0	1	5	1	12	−11	1		0–4	0–1	1–1	—

Source: UEFA
Rules for classification: Group stage tiebreakers

17 September 2014 1	Ajax (Netherlands)	1–1	(France) Paris Saint-Germain	Amsterdam, Netherlands
	Schöne 74'	Report	Cavani 14'	Stadium: Amsterdam ArenA; Attendance: 50,430; Referee: Wolfgang Stark (Germany)

30 September 2014 2	Paris Saint-Germain (France)	3–2	(Spain) Barcelona	Paris, France
	David Luiz 10'; Verratti 26'; Matuidi 54'	Report	Messi 12'; Neymar 56'	Stadium: Parc des Princes; Attendance: 46,400; Referee: Nicola Rizzoli (Italy)

21 October 2014 3	APOEL (Cyprus)	0–1	(France) Paris Saint-Germain	Nicosia, Cyprus
		Report	Cavani 87'	Stadium: GSP Stadium; Attendance: 18,659; Referee: Ovidiu Hațegan (Romania)

5 November 2014 4	Paris Saint-Germain (France)	1–0	(Cyprus) APOEL	Paris, France
	Cavani 1'	Report		Stadium: Parc des Princes; Attendance: 45,816; Referee: Olegário Benquerença (Portugal)

25 November 2014 5	Paris Saint-Germain (France)	3–1	(Netherlands) Ajax	Paris, France
	Cavani 33', 83'; Ibrahimović 78'	Report	Klaassen 67'	Stadium: Parc des Princes; Attendance: 46,130; Referee: Matej Jug (Slovenia)

10 December 2014 6	Barcelona (Spain)	3–1	(France) Paris Saint-Germain	Barcelona, Spain
	Messi 19'; Neymar 41'; Suárez 77'	Report	Ibrahimović 15'	Stadium: Camp Nou; Attendance: 82,570; Referee: Martin Atkinson (England)

==== Knockout phase ====
===== Round of 16 =====
17 February 2015 First leg	Paris Saint-Germain (France)	1–1	(England) Chelsea	Paris, France
	Cavani 54'	Report	Ivanović 36'	Stadium: Parc des Princes; Attendance: 46,146; Referee: Cüneyt Çakır (Turkey)

11 March 2015 Second leg	Chelsea (England)	2–2 (a.e.t.) (3–3a agg.)	(France) Paris Saint-Germain	London, England
	Cahill 81'; Hazard 96' (pen.)	Report	David Luiz 86'; Thiago Silva 114'	Stadium: Stamford Bridge; Attendance: 37,692; Referee: Björn Kuipers (Netherlands)

===== Quarter-finals =====
15 April 2015 First leg	Paris Saint-Germain (France)	1–3	(Spain) Barcelona	Paris, France
	Mathieu 82' (o.g.)	Report	Neymar 18'; Suárez 67', 79'	Stadium: Parc des Princes; Attendance: 45,893; Referee: Mark Clattenburg (England)

21 April 2015 Second leg	Barcelona (Spain)	2–0 (5–1 agg.)	(France) Paris Saint-Germain	Barcelona, Spain
	Neymar 14', 34'	Report		Stadium: Camp Nou; Attendance: 84,477; Referee: Svein Oddvar Moen (Norway)
