= Alvis =

Alvis is a given name and a surname (close to the uncommon Scottish surname Alves).

Alvis may also refer to:

- Alvi, a Muslim community in South Asia, who claims descent from the fourth Rashidun caliph, Ali ibn Abi Talib
- Alvis Car and Engineering Company, British luxury car and military vehicle manufacturer which later became Alvis plc
- Alvis plc (formerly United Scientific Holdings plc), a defence contractor which acquired Alvis Cars and became the UK's largest armoured vehicle manufacturer
- Hayes Alvis (1907–1972), American jazz bassist and tubist
- Max Alvis (born 1938), Major League Baseball player
- Alvis Darby (born 1954), American football player
- Alvis E. Hamilton, a character in the anime Last Exile
- Alvis, a major character in the video game Xenoblade Chronicles
- Alvis octopus, a junior synonym of the fossil crustacean Pseudastacus
- Arvis, a major antagonist in the game Fire Emblem: Genealogy of the Holy War

== See also ==
- Alvíss, a dwarf in Norse mythology
