= Tiago Alves =

Tiago Alves may refer to:

- Tiago Alves (footballer, born 1984), Brazilian footballer who plays as a defender
- Tiago Alves (footballer, born 1993), Brazilian footballer who plays as a winger
- Tiago Alves (footballer, born 1996), Portuguese footballer who plays as a winger

== See also ==
- Thiago Alves (disambiguation)
