= Alves dos Santos =

Alves dos Santos and dos Santos Alves are a combined surname, may refer to:

== Sports people ==
- Tatiana Alves dos Santos Brazilian volleyball player

=== Football (soccer) players ===
- Caio César Alves dos Santos (1986)
- Claudiano "Diano" Alves dos Santos (1981)
- Jaílson Alexandre Alves dos Santos (1981)
- Rafael Alves dos Santos (1984)
- Heleno dos Santos Alves (1978) Brazilian football (soccer) player

== Other persons ==
- Rui Baltazar dos Santos Alves, revolutionary Mozambican politician and university rector

== See also ==
- Alves da Silva
