= Jérémi Kimmakon =

French footballer (born 1994)

Personal information
- Full name: Jérémi Ore Nekpadro Kimmakon
- Date of birth: 29 May 1994 (age 32)
- Place of birth: Lagny-sur-Marne, France
- Height: 1.79 m (5 ft 10 in)
- Position: Winger

Team information
- Current team: Granville
- Number: 7

Youth career
- 2003–2004: Boulogne-Billancourt
- 2004–2006: Créteil
- 2007–2008: Boulogne-Billancourt
- 2009–2010: Créteil
- 2010–2012: Châteauroux

Senior career*
Years	Team	Apps	(Gls)
2012–2014	Châteauroux B	19	(1)
2014–2015	Paris Saint-Germain B	21	(4)
2014–2015	Paris Saint-Germain	1	(0)
2015–2016	Bournemouth B		
2016–2017	Pomigliano	5	(0)
2017–2018	Bourges 18	19	(2)
2018–2019	Blois	28	(5)
2019–2020	Les Herbiers	17	(4)
2020–2021	Blois	6	(1)
2021–	Granville	13	(0)
- * Club domestic league appearances and goals as of 22:21, 9 April 2022 (UTC)

Jérémi Ore Nekpadro Kimmakon (born 29 May 1994) is a French professional footballer who plays as a winger for Championnat National 1 club Granville.

== Club career ==
Kimmakon was born in Lagny-sur-Marne, and is of Ivorian descent. At youth level, he played for several teams, including US Créteil-Lusitanos. He also spent four years at Châteauroux.

Kimmakon joined Paris Saint-Germain in 2014, and made his first team debut on 17 December 2014, in a 3–1 away win in the Coupe de la Ligue against Ajaccio. He replaced Lucas Moura after 83 minutes.

Ahead of the 2019–20 season, Kimmakon joined Les Herbiers. In May 2021, he signed for Granville.

== International career ==
Kimmakon received call-ups from French and Ivorian youth teams in the past. He was part of the Ivory Coast U17 national team that competed at the 2011 FIFA U-17 World Cup, but did not make an appearance in the tournament.

== Honours ==
Paris Saint-Germain

- Coupe de la Ligue: 2014–15
