= William de Alwis =

William De Alwis Seneviratne
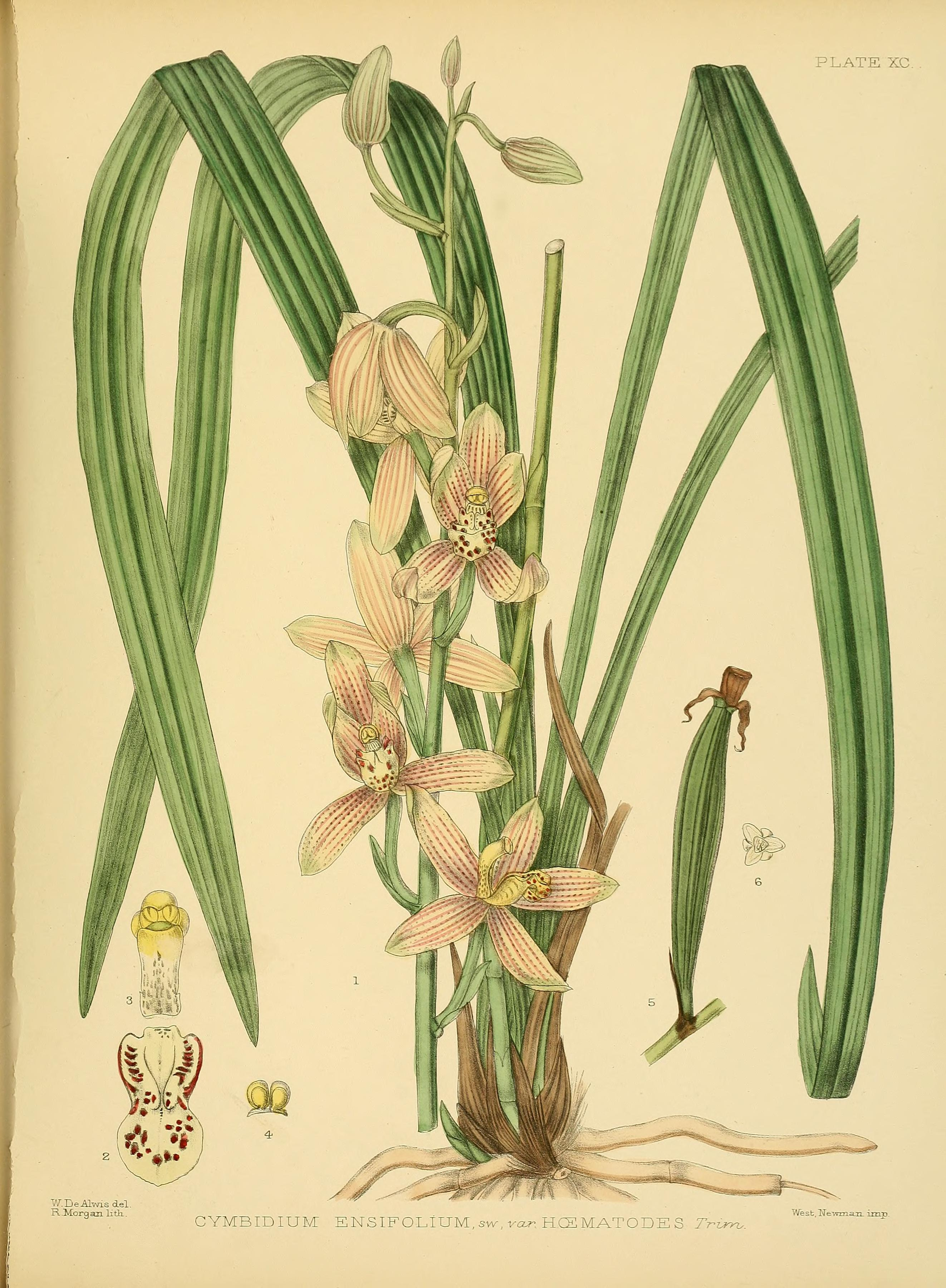
- Born: 1842
- Died: 1916 (aged 73–74)
- Known for: Natural history illustrations

William De Alwis Seneviratne (1842–1916) was a Ceylonese artist and entomologist. With his brother George (dates unknown), William made a lasting contribution to the knowledge of the lepidoptera (butterflies and moths) of Ceylon.

The brothers' father, Haramanis de Alwis Seneviratne (1792–1894) was a botanical illustrator who worked at the Botanical Gardens in Ceylon at Kalutara between 1818–1822 and Peradeniya from 1822–1861. He illustrated over 2,000 plants. William was appointed to succeed him to continue the work as a botanical artist.

George Thwaites, the Director of the Botanical Garden at Peradeniya between 1849 and 1879, who was impressed by the de Alwis brothers' botanical drawings, recommended to W H Gregory, the Governor of Ceylon, that they should draw from nature the butterflies and moths of Ceylon. Thwaites supervised the drawings, many of which were illustrations of specimens that he had collected himself. The drawings were accurate and later used by a number of authors publishing on the lepidoptera of Ceylon, notably by George Morrison Reid Henry and L G O Woodhouse. The De Alwis drawings are in the Natural History Museum, London.

== Books ==
- A hand-book to the flora of Ceylon. Henry Trimen. London: Dulau, 1893-1931.
