= Lélia Gonzalez =

Brazilian activist (1935–1994)

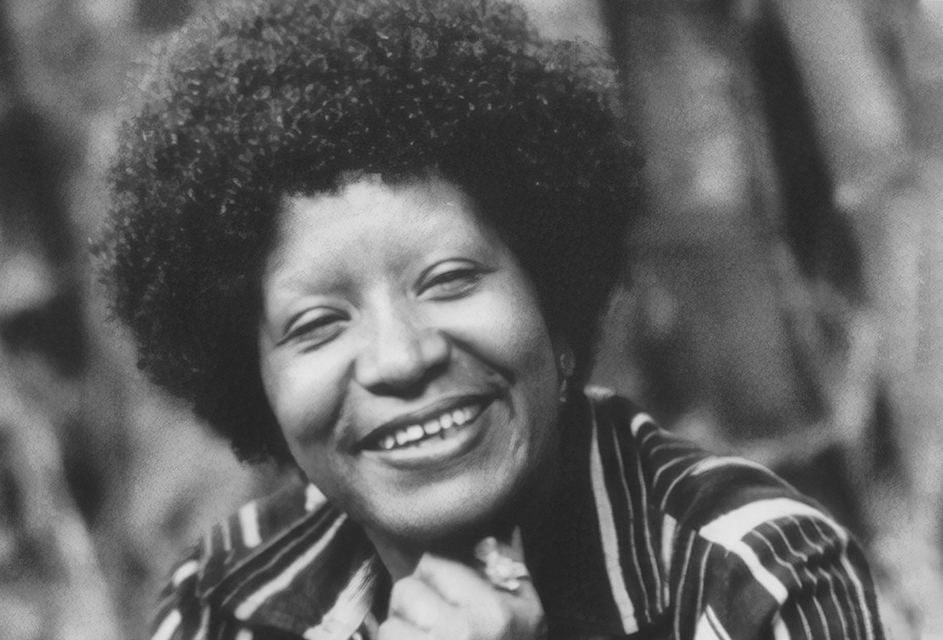
- Born: 1 February 1935; Belo Horizonte, Minas Gerais, Brazil
- Died: 10 July 1994 (aged 59); Rio de Janeiro, Brazil
- Occupations: activist, professor, anthropologist, feminist, intellectual

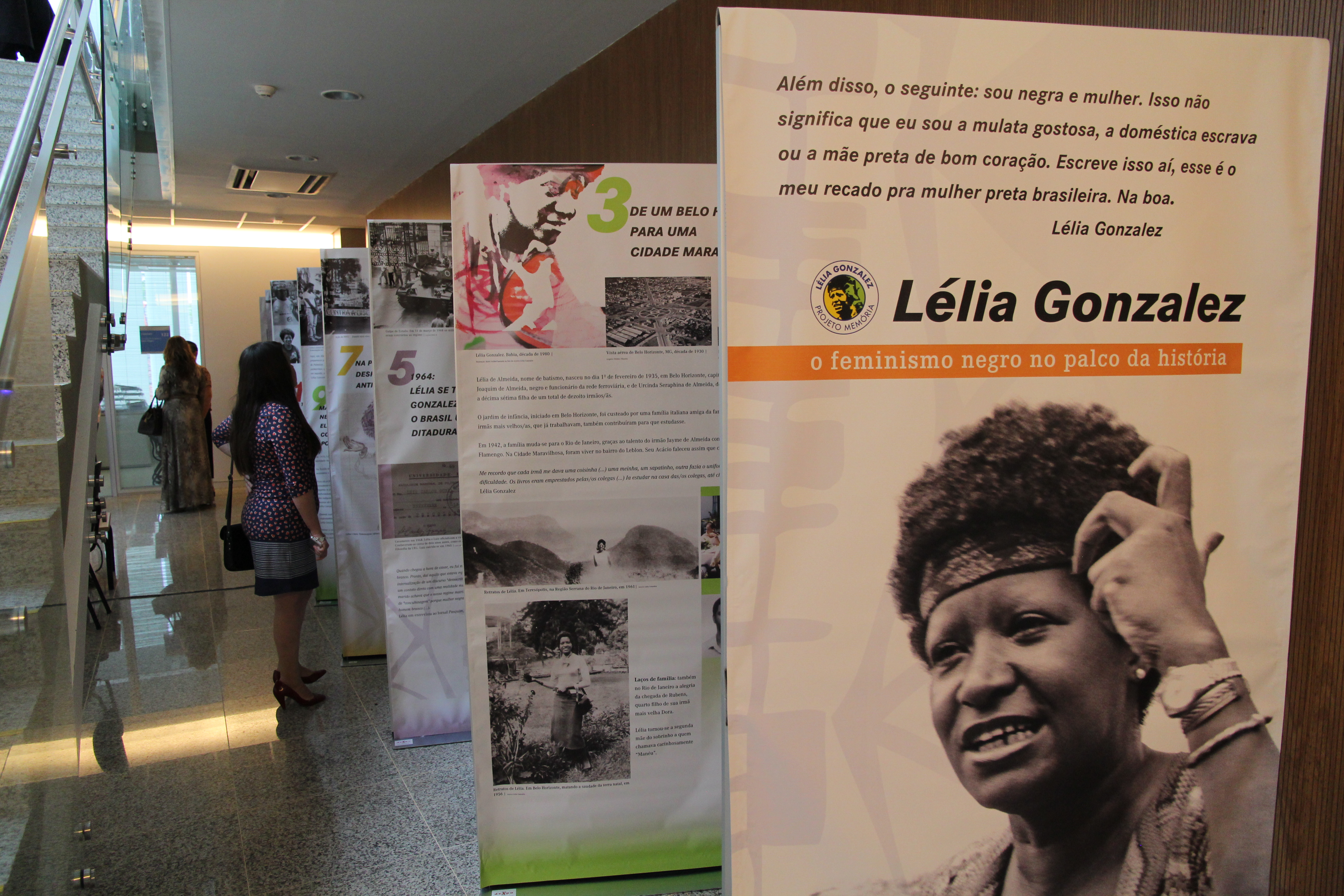
Opening of Lélia Gonzalez building

Lélia de Almeida Gonzalez (Belo Horizonte, February 1, 1935 – Rio de Janeiro July 10, 1994) was a Brazilian intellectual, author, activist, professor, philosopher, and anthropologist. Being considered one of the principal authors of Black feminism in the country, Gonzalez's work is used as a reference in studies and debates surrounding gender, race, and class in Brazil, Latin America, and throughout the world. She also co-founded the Instituto de Pesquisas das Culturas Negras do Rio de Janeiro (Institute for Research of Black Cultures of Rio de Janeiro) and the Movimento Negro Unificado (Unified Black Movement).

Gonzalez's presence was significant in both academia and politics, her work having circulated through diverse spaces. Her work discusses intersectionality before the concept was even established, in addition to fighting against sexism and racism. She also coined terms such as "Pretuguês" and "Amefricanidade," which are widely used today when discussing of race in Brazil.

== Early life ==
Born Lélia de Almeida on February 1, 1935 in Belo Horizonte, Minas Gerais, she was the daughter of a Black railway worker and an Indigenous domestic worker. Gonzalez was the seventeenth eighteen siblings, one of whom was professional soccer player Jaime de Almeida. Her brother's offer to play for the soccer club Flamengo allowed the family to move to Rio in 1942 in search of better living conditions.

Shortly after arriving in Rio, Gonzalez worked as a nanny. She continued her studies in public school and graduated from the prestigious Pedro II College in 1954. Her years of rigorous study and the quality of education she received changed the trajectory of her life.

== Career and Trajectory ==
After completing high school, Gonzalez continued on to university, earning a bachelor's degree in history and geography from Guanabara State University (Now Rio de Janeiro State University) and later another in philosophy while working as a teacher in the public school system. As a secondary school teacher at the Fernando Rodrigues da Silveira Application College. In the late 1960s, her philosophy classes were a place of resistance and sociopolitical critique, which definitively shaped the thinking and actions of her students.

Gonzalez earned her master's degree in social communication, and her doctorate in political and social anthropology, concentrating her research on gender and ethnicity. After receiving her doctorate, she went on to lecture at various prestigious universities throughout Rio, including, for example, a class on Brazilian Culture at the Pontifical Catholic University of Rio de Janeiro (PUC-Rio). Her last position at the institution was head of the Sociology and Politics Department. Gonzalez also studied psychoanalysis, and there has been a notable increase in interest in her life and work, especially in the psychoanalytic field, as she delved into the works of the French psychoanalyst Jacques Lacan.

In 1976, she was invited by the director of the School of Visual Arts of Lage Park, Rubens Gerchman, to teach a course on Black Culture.

Gonzalez was a pioneer in her field: She helped found institutions such as o Movimento Negro Unificado (United Black Movement), o Instituto de Pesquisas das Culturas Negras do Rio de Janeiro (Institute for Research of Black Cultures of Rio de Janeiro), o Coletivo de Mulheres Negras N'Zinga (N'Zinga Black Women's Collective), o Partido dos Trabalhadores (Worker's Party), and Olodum. She was also involved in mobilizing Black men and women towards the Democratic Labor Party (DPT) in resisting the dictatorship, and in supporting the struggle of Black Brazilians against apartheid in South Africa. She also contributed to the inclusion of Black women in public policy through her work with the National Council for Women’s Rights (CNDM), where she served from 1985 to 1989, and helped develop a body of thought that interconnected gender and race, particularly within the Latin American context. She ran for federal deputy with the Workers’ Party (PT) but was not elected, remaining as the first alternate, and in the following 1986 elections ran for state deputy with the Democratic Labour Party (PDT), again unsuccessfully, serving as an alternate.

Throughout her career, she engaged extensively with cultural, artistic, and intellectual groups. In the mid-1970s, she collaborated with the Black Art Recreational Guild and the Quilombo Samba School alongside master Candeia. Gonzalez also took part in the founding of the Freudian College in Rio de Janeiro, established in 1975 by Magno Machado Dias and Betty Milan. Later, she served as an advisor to filmmaker Cacá Diegues for his film Quilombo (1984). She was a member of a Candomblé temple in Rio de Janeiro and celebrated the rise of Afro-blocs and afoxés in Salvador, Bahia.

Gonzalez's work, which was shaped by the military dictatorship and the rise of social movements, reflect her efforts to connect broader societal struggles with the specific demands of Black women. Her knowledge, as well as her writing style consisting of using informal language to address complex subjects, have established her as an international reference in various universities and the United Nations.

Gonzalez died on July 11, 1994, at the age of 59, from a heart attack at her home in Cosme Velho, in the city of Rio de Janeiro.

== Role During the Military Dictatorship ==
During the Brazilian Military Dictatorship, Gonzalez criticized the regime as well as the myth of racial democracy and the belief that social sciences were politically neutral. As a professor at the Rio de Janeiro State University (UERJ), her classroom was a space for resistance and critical thinking, even while being watched by agencies like DOPS.

In the late 1970s, Lélia Gonzalez was one of the founders of the Unified Black Movement (MNU).The MNU challenged the state’s refusal to recognize racism as a structural element of Brazil’s social inequalities, at a time when the military regime was trying to reshape its image. In her work, Racismo e sexismo na cultura brasileira (1983), she argued that racism and sexism are deeply connected forms of oppression. Through her idea of “Amefricanity,” she highlighted the importance of Black women’s experiences and knowledge in shaping Latin American identity, leaving a lasting impact on studies of race, gender, and power in Brazil. In the 1980s, as Brazil moved toward democracy, she began working in institutional spaces such as the National Council for Women’s Rights (CNDM), bringing attention to the specific experiences of Black women, which were not discussed in mainstream feminist movements of the time.

== Legacy ==
Lélia Gonzalez has been honored in many ways across Brazil. A public school in Rio de Janeiro, a cultural center in Goiânia, a student collective at the University of São Paulo, and a cultural cooperative in Aracaju all bear her name.

In 2003, the playwright Márcio Meirelles wrote and directed the play Candaces - A reconstrução do fogo ("Candaces: A Reconstruction of Fire"), based on her work.

In 2010, the government of Bahia created the Lélia Gonzalez Award to encourage local policies supporting women.

The American philosopher Angela Davis, during a 2019 visit to Brazil, praised Lélia as one of the world’s pioneers in connecting gender, class, and race, saying, “I learn more from Lélia Gonzalez than you learn from me.”

In 2020, the Brazilian Political Science Association (ABCP) launched the Lélia Gonzalez Award for Scientific Manuscripts on Race and Politics, which helps fund research by Black and Brown scholars on inequality, identity, and racial discrimination. On February 1, 2020, Google celebrated her 85th birthday with a Google Doodle.

In 2024, a statue of her was erected in Belo Horizonte’s Municipal Park alongside writer Carolina Maria de Jesus.

In 2025, marking what would have been her 90th birthday, events were held in São Paulo, Salvador, and Rio de Janeiro. The University of Brasília (UnB) awarded her a posthumous honorary doctorate and named its Black Cultural Center after her.

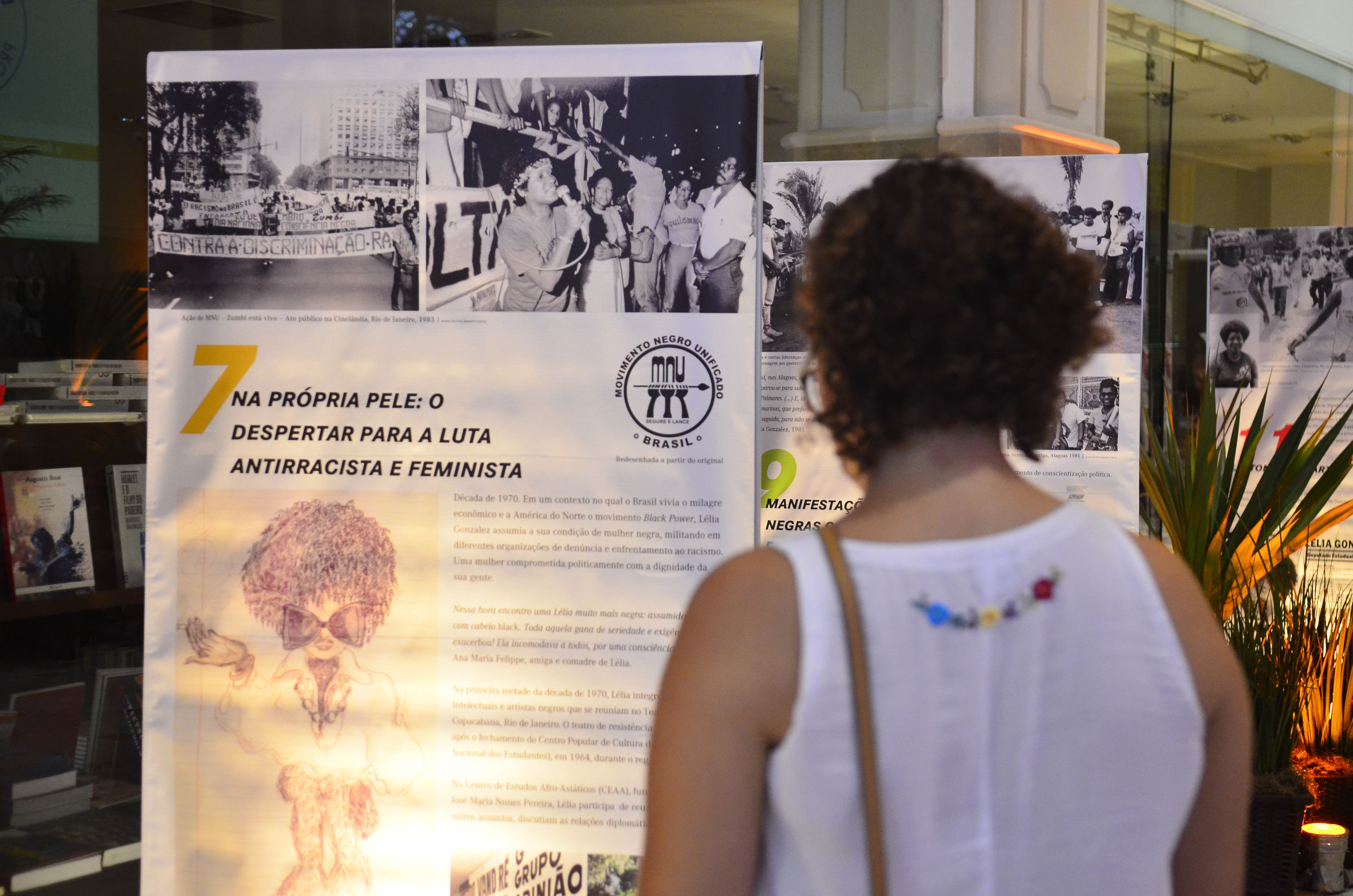
Tribute to Lélia Gonzalez at Centro Cultural Banco do Brasil, Rio de Janeiro (Tomaz Silva/Agência Brasil/CCBY3.0)

== Works ==
=== Books ===
- Festas Populares no Brasil. Rio de Janeiro, Índex, 1987.
- Lugar de Negro (com Carlos Hasenbalg). Rio de Janeiro, Marco Zero, 1982. 115p. pp. 9–66. (Coleção Dois Pontos 3).
- Por um Feminismo Afro-Latino-Americano. Rio de Janeiro: Zahar.

=== Essays and articles ===
- "Mulher Negra, essa Quilombola". Folha de S. Paulo, Folhetim. Domingo 22 de novembro de 1981.
- LUZ, Madel T. (org.). "A Mulher Negra na Sociedade Brasileira". In: O Lugar da Mulher; Estudos sobre a Condição Feminina na Sociedade Atual. Rio de Janeiro, Graal, 1982. 146p. pp. 87–106. (Coleção Tendências 1).
- SILVA, Luiz Antônio Machado et alii. "Racismo e Sexismo na Cultura Brasileira". In: Movimentos Sociais Urbanos, Minorias Étnicas e outros Estudos. Brasília, ANPOCS, 1983. 303p. pp. 223–44. (Ciências Sociais Hoje 2).
- "O Terror nosso de Cada Dia". In. Raça e Classe. (2): 8, ago./set. 1987.
- "A Categoria Político-Cultural de Amefricanidade". In. Tempo Brasileiro, Rio de Janeiro (92/93): 69-82, jan./jun. 1988.
- "As Amefricanas do Brasil e sua Militância". In. Maioria Falante. (7): 5, maio/jun. 1988.
- "Nanny". In. Humanidades, Brasília (17): 23-5, 1988.
- "Por um Feminismo Afrolatinoamericano". In. Revista Isis Internacional. (8), out. 1988.
- "A Importância da Organização da Mulher Negra no Processo de Transformação Social". In. Raça e Classe. (5): 2, nov./dez. 1988.
- "Uma Viagem à Martinica - I". In. MNU Jornal. (20): 5, out./nov.
