= Francisco Alves, Paraná =

Francisco Alves
- Municipality
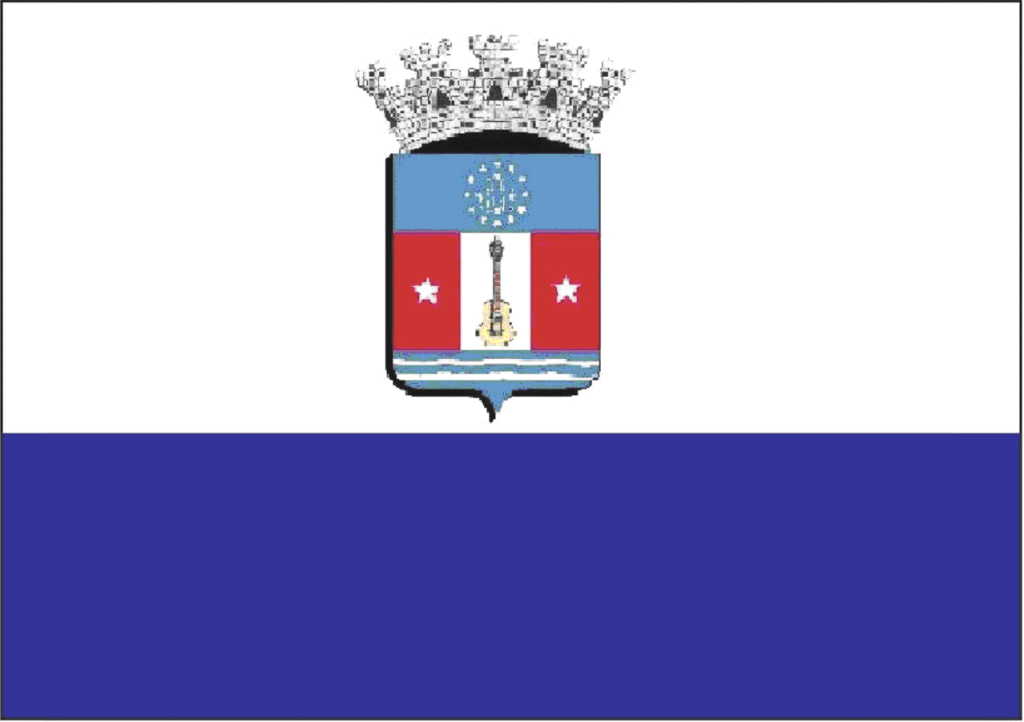
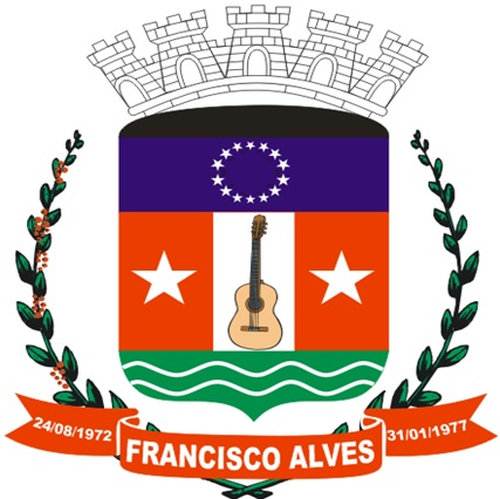
- Flag Coat of arms

- Municipal location

- Location in Brazil
- Coordinates: 24°04′S 53°50′W
- Country: Brazil
- Region: Southern
- State: Paraná
- Mesoregion: Noroeste Paranaense

Population (2020)
  - Total: 5,993
- Time zone: UTC−3 (BRT)

Francisco Alves is a municipality in the state of Paraná in the Southern Region of Brazil. It lies along the roads BR-272 and PR-182.

== See also ==
- List of municipalities in Paraná
