= Robert Alves =

Scottish poet and writer

Robert Alves (1745–1794), was a Scottish poet and prose writer.

Alves was born in Elgin on 11 December 1745. His father's circumstances were humble, but as a boy of promise he was placed at the Elgin grammar school, where he made such good use of his opportunities that when sent to Aberdeen he took at Marischal College the highest bursary of the year in which he competed. An ‘Elegy on Time’, written while he was at Aberdeen, procured him the friendship of Br. Beattie, then one of the professors of Marischal College. On leaving Aberdeen Alves was successively master of a Banffshire parish school and tutor in the family of a gentleman who offered him a living in the Church of Scotland. But he preferred the head-mastership, with a lower stipend, of the Banff grammar school, which he held from 1773 until 1779, when, on the failure of his suit to a young lady of beauty and fortune, he migrated to Edinburgh. There he taught the classics and several modern languages, occasionally translating and compiling for the Edinburgh booksellers.

In 1780 appeared his ‘Ode to Britannia ... on occasion of our late successes’, in which the gallantry of Scottish officers during the campaign in the Carolinas against the revolted American colonists was sung with patriotic enthusiasm. In 1782 he published a volume of ‘Poems’, and in 1789 ‘Edinburgh, a poem in two parts’, a lively performance describing the topography and social aspects of the Scottish capital, together with the ‘Weeping Bard, a poem in sixteen cantos’, much of which is plaintively auto-biographical. Alves died suddenly on 1 June 1794, while seeing through the press the work which appeared in the same year as ‘Sketches of the History of Literature, containing Lives and Characters of the most eminent Writers in different languages, ancient and modern, and critical remarks on their works. Lord Gardenstone, a literary Scottish judge, seems to have superintended its issue from the press, and he contributed to it several critical observations.
