= Neto Karfan =

Brazilian politician (born 1994)

- Karfan in 2024

Member of the Legislative Assembly of Goiás
- Incumbent
- Assumed office 1 February 2027

Personal details
- Born: 30 June 1994 (age 32)
- Party: New Party (since 2026)

Ali Mustafa Karfan Neto (born 30 June 1994), better known as Neto Karfan, is a Brazilian politician who was elected member of the Legislative Assembly of Goiás in 2026. From 2021 to 2024, he served as speaker of the Municipal Chamber of Itumbiara.
