= Lucas Moura =

Brazilian footballer (born 1992)

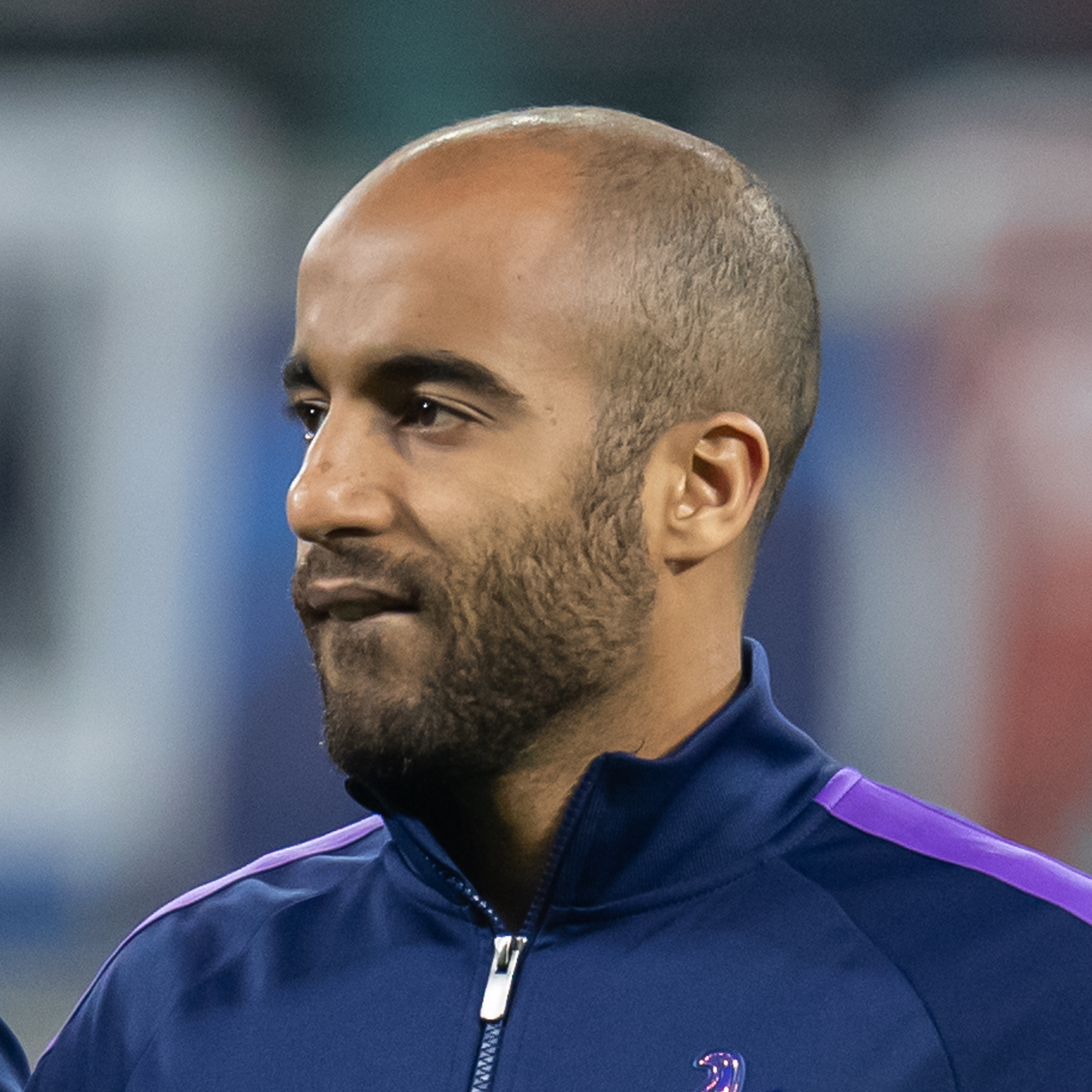
- Lucas lining up for Tottenham Hotspur in 2020

Personal information
- Full name: Lucas Rodrigues Moura da Silva
- Date of birth: 13 August 1992 (age 34)
- Place of birth: São Paulo, Brazil
- Height: 1.72 m (5 ft 8 in)
- Positions: Winger; attacking midfielder

Team information
- Current team: São Paulo
- Number: 7

Youth career
- 1999–2002: Juventus-SP
- 2002–2005: Corinthians
- 2005–2010: São Paulo

Senior career*
| Years | Team | Apps | (Gls) |
| 2010–2012 | São Paulo | 103 | (28) |
| 2013–2018 | Paris Saint-Germain | 153 | (34) |
| 2018–2023 | Tottenham Hotspur | 152 | (20) |
| 2023– | São Paulo | 92 | (22) |

International career
| 2011–2012 | Brazil U20 | 9 | (4) |
| 2012 | Brazil U23 | 5 | (1) |
| 2011–2024 | Brazil | 37 | (4) |
Medal record
Men's football
Representing Brazil
FIFA Confederations Cup
| Winner | 2013 Brazil |
Olympic Games
| Silver medal – second place | 2012 London | Team |
South American U-20 Championship
| Winner | 2011 Peru |
- * Club domestic league appearances and goals as of 23:22, 28 October 2026 (UTC)

Lucas Rodrigues Moura da Silva (born 13 August 1992), known as Lucas Moura (Brazilian Portuguese: [ˈlukaz ˈmowɾɐ]), is a Brazilian professional footballer who plays as a winger or attacking midfielder for Campeonato Brasileiro Série A club São Paulo.

Moura started his professional career at São Paulo where he became one of the best players in the Campeonato Brasileiro. His pace and dribbling skills garnered attention from numerous European clubs, eventually earning him a transfer to French side Paris Saint-Germain. After winning multiple domestic trophies over a five-year span at the club, Moura was then signed by English side Tottenham Hotspur in January 2018. He was involved in the side reaching their first ever UEFA Champions League final, scoring a historic hat-trick against Ajax in the second leg of the semi-final of the competition to help Spurs advance to the final. After five years with Tottenham, Moura returned to São Paulo in 2023, winning the Copa do Brasil in his first season back at the club.

Moura made his senior international debut for Brazil in 2011 and has since earned over 30 caps, representing the nation at two editions of the Copa América, the 2012 Olympics (where he won a silver medal), and the 2013 FIFA Confederations Cup, winning the latter title.

== Club career ==
=== São Paulo ===
Moura joined São Paulo in 2005 after playing for the youth teams of Juventus-SP and Corinthians; he was known as Marcelinho, since he played for a Marcelinho Carioca football school as a child and also had physical resemblance with the former footballer. Having had prominence at youth level, he was promoted to play professionally by Milton Cruz. Moura made his debut with the São Paulo first-team in 2010, scoring four goals and providing four assists in 25 appearances. In the same year, he stated his desire to be known for his given name instead of a nickname to "make his own history in football without comparisons". In 2011, Moura scored nine goals and provided four assists in 28 appearances in the Campeonato Brasileiro and 13 goals and eight assists in all competitions.

=== Paris Saint-Germain ===
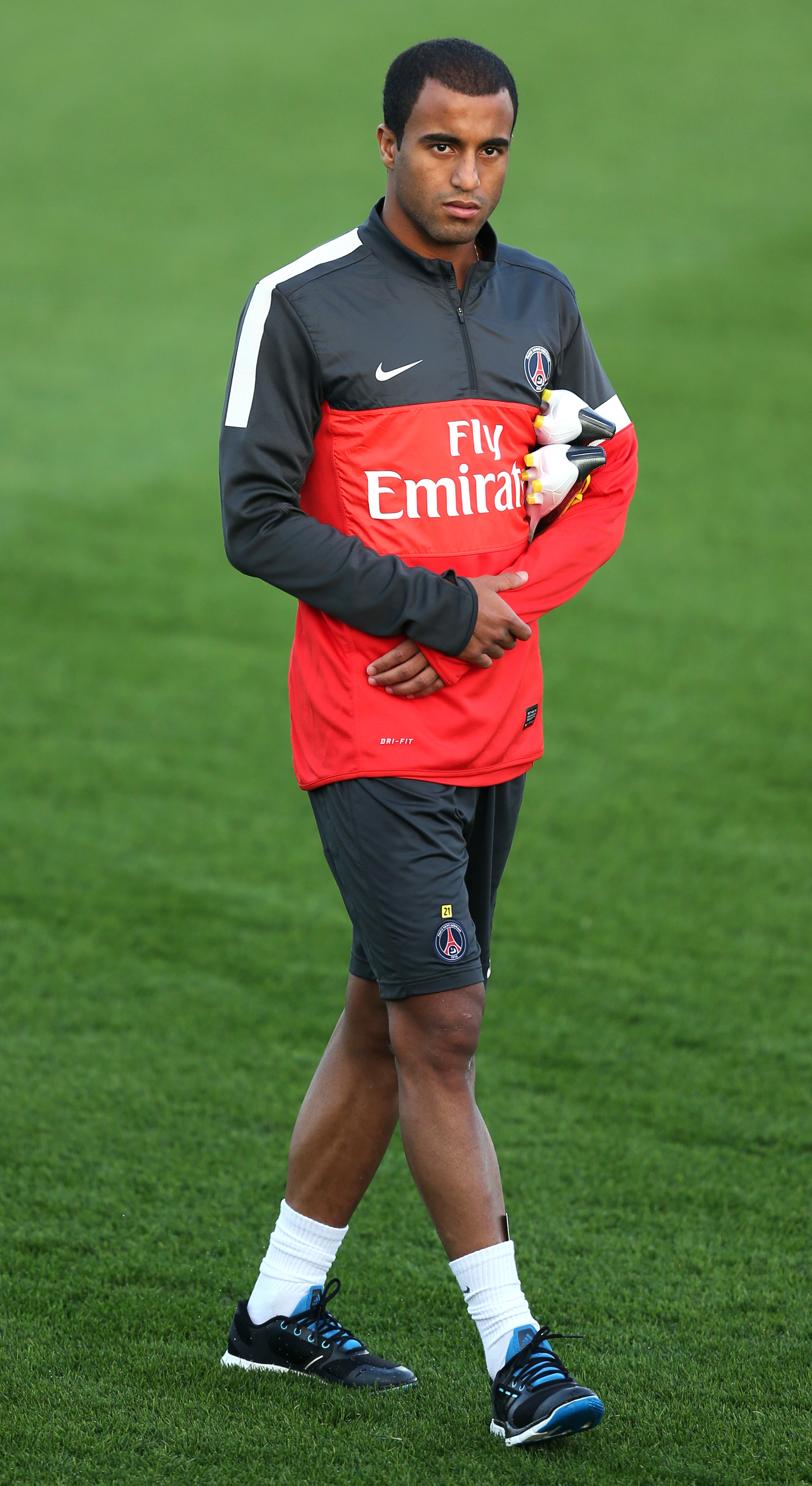
Moura training with Paris Saint-Germain in 2013

During the summer of 2012, Manchester United and Inter Milan were reported to be interested in signing Moura. On 8 August 2012, Paris Saint-Germain won the battle and announced the player would be moving to the club in January 2013. He would be the club's most expensive signing. The transfer fee was reported to be in the region of €45 million (£38 million). It was announced that Moura would wear the No. 29 shirt for the remainder of the season.

On 11 January 2013, Moura made his debut against Ajaccio, in a match that ended as a 0–0 draw. He also played in the Champions League away victory over Valencia on 12 February, assisting a goal in the process. On 13 September 2013, he scored his first goal for PSG in a 2–0 league victory over Bordeaux.

For the 2014–15 season, following Jérémy Ménez's transfer to Milan, Moura was handed the No. 7 shirt – the same number he wore while playing for São Paulo. He made his season debut for PSG in their 2–0 Trophée des Champions victory over Coupe de France winners Guingamp on 2 August 2014 at the Workers Stadium in Beijing.

He scored his first goal of the 2014–15 Ligue 1 campaign on 16 August, volleying in a Gregory van der Wiel cross as PSG defeated Bastia 2–0. On 5 October, Moura scored the opening goal in a match that finished 1–1 against title rivals Monaco. With his two goals in PSG's 3–0 victory over Bordeaux on 25 October, he equalled his league tally from the previous season.

On 7 August 2015, Moura scored the first goal of the 2015–16 Ligue 1 season in PSG's 1–0 defeat of Lille at the Stade Pierre-Mauroy.

On 15 October 2016, Moura scored PSG's first goal in the 13th minute in a 2–1 away win against Nancy in a Ligue 1 match with a curling free-kick from the left which nobody got a touch to; that was his fifth league goal of the 2016–17 Ligue 1 season. For the 2017–18 Ligue 1 season, he appeared only as substitute six times for the club, and left in January 2018.

=== Tottenham Hotspur ===
On 31 January 2018, Moura signed a contract with Tottenham Hotspur until 2023 for a transfer fee of around £25 million. He made his debut for Tottenham in the 2017–18 UEFA Champions League match against Juventus on 13 February, coming on as a late substitute in the match that ended in a 2–2 draw. He made his first start as well as scoring his first goal for the club in the FA Cup tie against Rochdale on 18 February that also finished 2–2.

In the 2018–19 season, Moura scored his first Premier League goal on 18 August 2018 in Spurs' 3–1 win over Fulham. In the following match on 27 August 2018, he scored a brace against Manchester United as Tottenham won 3–0 in only their third away win at Old Trafford in 27 games. He scored his first Champions League goal for Spurs in the group round match against PSV. In the away match against Barcelona at the Camp Nou, Moura scored a late equaliser after Barcelona took an early lead in the game. The game ended 1–1, which sent Tottenham through into the knockout stage together with Barcelona. On 13 April 2019, he scored a hat-trick in the 4–0 win over Huddersfield Town. This was his first hat-trick in Europe and the first ever hat-trick scored at the new Tottenham Hotspur Stadium.

On 8 May 2019, Moura scored a second half hat-trick in Tottenham's 3–2 victory over Ajax at the Johan Cruyff Arena in the second leg of their Champions League semi-finals. Spurs came back from 2–0 down on the night, and 3–0 down on aggregate to win on away goals. His third goal, in the 96th minute, sent his team into a Champions League final for the first time in their history. This performance led L'Équipe to award him a perfect ten rating, making him the tenth ever player to be awarded a ten rating by them.

On 9 August 2019, Moura signed a new contract with Tottenham until 2024. He scored his first goal of the 2019–20 season on 17 August 2019, equalising against Manchester City within nineteen seconds of being introduced as a substitute.

On 12 January 2023, it was announced that Moura's contract with the club would not be extended. On 18 May, Spurs confirmed that Moura would depart the club in the summer. On 28 May, the last day of the Premier League season, Moura netted during stoppage time in a 4–1 win over Leeds United in his final game for the club.

=== Return to São Paulo ===
In August 2023, after three months without a club, Moura returned to São Paulo, marking his comeback after eleven years. His signing garnered attention as the biggest move of the winter transfer window in Brazilian football, creating a significant impact on social media. The contract stipulated his stay until December.

During his presentation, he received the number 7 shirt, worn in his initial stint, handed over by the previous holder, Alisson.

On 6 July, he played his return match, coming in on the second half in the 2–0 defeat against Atlético Mineiro at the Morumbi. He participated in an emotional pre-match presentation alongside the high-profile addition James Rodríguez. Despite a positive debut with chances created, he conceded the penalty which resulted in the second Atlético goal. He scored his first goal since his return on 13 August, in the 1–1 draw against Flamengo in the 19th round of Brasileirão.

On 16 August, he had the standout performance of the Copa do Brasil semi-finals, helping São Paulo win the return match against Corinthians by 2–0 (3–2 on aggregate). During the match, Lucas outpaced and dribbled past Corinthians' slow and visibly frustrated defense, creating multiple chances before finally scoring a header in the 32nd minute of the first half, securing the comeback in the aggregate score.

On 24 August, he scored the only goal in São Paulo's 2–1 away defeat to LDU in the Copa Sudamericana, which marked his first appearance in the competition since 2012.

Lucas played both legs of the cup final against Flamengo, with São Paulo winning the away game 1–0 and tying the home match 1–1, thus securing São Paulo's first Copa do Brasil title. Despite only playing three matches, Lucas was praised as one of the key players in the tournament.

On 22 December, he extended his contract with São Paulo until the end of 2026.

== International career ==
=== Youth career and early senior career ===
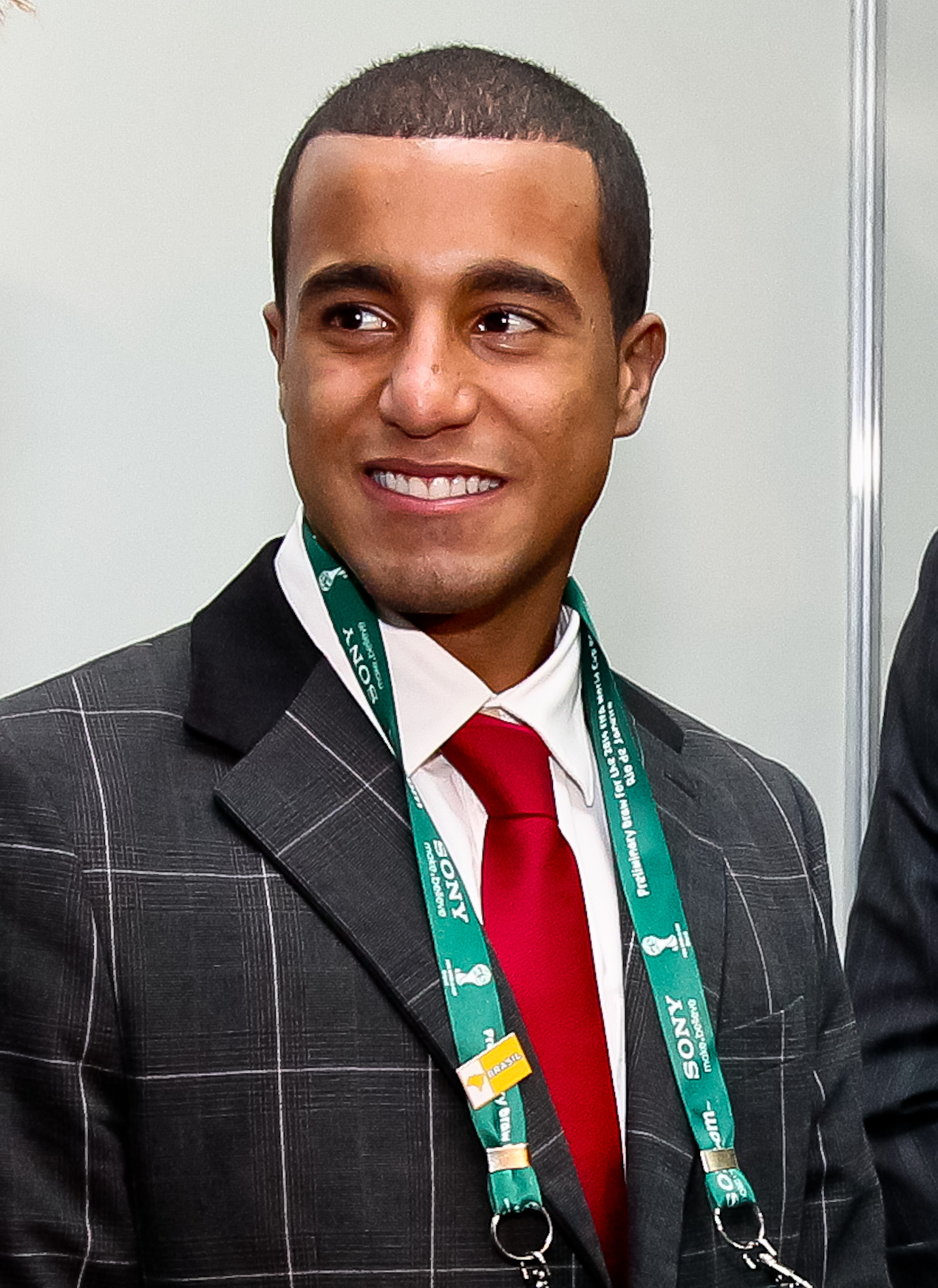
Moura in 2011

Moura was a frequent member of Brazil's Under-20 international side. In February 2011, he played for Brazil in the Under-20 South American Championship where he scored a hat-trick in a 6–0 victory over Uruguay in the final. Moura made his senior international debut for Brazil in a friendly match against Scotland on 27 March 2011. On 28 September 2011, Moura scored his first senior international goal for Brazil against Argentina.

=== 2011 Copa América ===
Moura was named in Mano Menezes' squad for the 2011 Copa América in Argentina. Moura appeared in the group stage matches against Paraguay, Ecuador and Venezuela as a second-half substitute on all occasions. He once again featured as a substitute in Brazil's penalty shoot-out defeat to Paraguay in the quarter-finals which eliminated Brazil from the competition.

=== 2012 Olympics ===
Moura was selected to compete for the Brazil Olympic football team in the 2012 Summer Olympics in London along with club teammates Casemiro and Bruno Uvini. He appeared in three matches as a substitute, including the Gold medal match with Mexico, and started in the 3–0 group stage victory over New Zealand.

=== 2013 Confederations Cup ===
Moura was selected by Luiz Felipe Scolari for the 2013 FIFA Confederations Cup on home soil.

=== Copa América Centenario ===
In 2016, Moura was named in Dunga's 23-man squad for the Copa América Centenario in the United States.

=== 2024 recall ===
In September 2024, six years after his last cap, Moura was called up for the 2026 FIFA World Cup qualifiers against Ecuador and Paraguay, and claimed that he initially thought it was a prank. He came on as a substitute in both matches.

== Style of play ==
Credited as a quick and mobile winger, who is also powerful, creative, and technically gifted, Moura is also known for his explosive acceleration, agility, leaping ability, and speed, as well as his movement, and his dribbling skills, in particular his use of trickery and feints, which make him a dangerous offensive threat. A versatile player, he is also capable of playing in several positions, and has also been deployed as a forward, in midfield, as a support striker, or even as an attacking midfielder behind the strikers. However, he has been accused of being inconsistent in the media, in particular in his youth, while his vision and decision-making have also been cited as weaknesses to his game.

== Career statistics ==
=== Club ===
As of match played 28 October 2026

Appearances and goals by club, season and competition
| Club | Season | League | | | State league (Note: Includes Campeonato Paulista) | | National cup (Note: Includes Copa do Brasil, Coupe de France, FA Cup) | | League cup (Note: Includes Coupe de la Ligue, EFL Cup) | | Continental | | Other | | Total | |
| Club | Season | Division | Apps | Goals | Apps | Goals | Apps | Goals | Apps | Goals | Apps | Goals | Apps | Goals | Apps | Goals |
|---|---|---|---|---|---|---|---|---|---|---|---|---|---|---|---|---|
| São Paulo | 2010 | Série A | 25 | 4 | 0 | 0 | 0 | 0 | — | | 0 | 0 | — | | 25 | 4 |
| São Paulo | 2011 | Série A | 28 | 9 | 8 | 3 | 4 | 0 | — | | 3 (Note: Appearances in Copa Sudamericana) | 1 | — | | 43 | 13 |
| São Paulo | 2012 | Série A | 21 | 6 | 21 | 6 | 9 | 2 | — | | 9 | 2 | — | | 60 | 16 |
| São Paulo | Total | | 74 | 19 | 29 | 9 | 13 | 2 | — | | 12 | 3 | — | | 128 | 33 |
| Paris Saint-Germain | 2012–13 | Ligue 1 | 10 | 0 | — | | 1 | 0 | 0 | 0 | 4 (Note: Appearance(s) in UEFA Champions League) | 0 | — | | 15 | 0 |
| Paris Saint-Germain | 2013–14 | Ligue 1 | 36 | 5 | — | | 2 | 0 | 4 | 0 | 10 | 0 | 1 (Note: Appearance in Trophée des Champions) | 0 | 53 | 5 |
| Paris Saint-Germain | 2014–15 | Ligue 1 | 29 | 7 | — | | 4 | 1 | 4 | 0 | 8 | 0 | 1 | 0 | 46 | 8 |
| Paris Saint-Germain | 2015–16 | Ligue 1 | 36 | 9 | — | | 6 | 1 | 4 | 1 | 9 | 2 | 1 | 0 | 56 | 13 |
| Paris Saint-Germain | 2016–17 | Ligue 1 | 37 | 12 | — | | 5 | 3 | 3 | 2 | 7 | 1 | 1 | 1 | 53 | 19 |
| Paris Saint-Germain | 2017–18 | Ligue 1 | 5 | 1 | — | | 0 | 0 | 1 | 0 | 0 | 0 | 0 | 0 | 6 | 1 |
| Paris Saint-Germain | Total | | 153 | 34 | — | | 18 | 5 | 16 | 3 | 38 | 3 | 4 | 1 | 229 | 46 |
| Tottenham Hotspur | 2017–18 | Premier League | 6 | 0 | — | | 4 | 1 | — | | 1 | 0 | — | | 11 | 1 |
| Tottenham Hotspur | 2018–19 | Premier League | 32 | 10 | — | | 2 | 0 | 3 | 0 | 12 | 5 | — | | 49 | 15 |
| Tottenham Hotspur | 2019–20 | Premier League | 35 | 4 | — | | 5 | 2 | 1 | 0 | 6 | 1 | — | | 47 | 7 |
| Tottenham Hotspur | 2020–21 | Premier League | 30 | 3 | — | | 3 | 1 | 4 | 0 | 13 (Note: Appearances in UEFA Europa League) | 5 | — | | 50 | 9 |
| Tottenham Hotspur | 2021–22 | Premier League | 34 | 2 | — | | 2 | 1 | 4 | 2 | 5 (Note: Appearances in UEFA Europa Conference League) | 1 | — | | 45 | 6 |
| Tottenham Hotspur | 2022–23 | Premier League | 15 | 1 | — | | 1 | 0 | 0 | 0 | 3 | 0 | — | | 19 | 1 |
| Tottenham Hotspur | Total | | 152 | 20 | — | | 17 | 5 | 12 | 2 | 40 | 12 | — | | 221 | 39 |
| São Paulo | 2023 | Série A | 14 | 1 | — | | 3 | 1 | — | | 2 | 1 | — | | 19 | 3 |
| São Paulo | 2024 | Série A | 28 | 10 | 7 | 2 | 5 | 1 | — | | 7 (Note: Appearances in Copa Libertadores) | 1 | — | | 47 | 14 |
| São Paulo | 2025 | Série A | 11 | 2 | 11 | 3 | 0 | 0 | — | | 4 | 0 | — | | 26 | 5 |
| São Paulo | 2026 | Série A | 12 | 2 | 9 | 2 | 0 | 0 | — | | 0 | 0 | — | | 21 | 4 |
| São Paulo | Total | | 65 | 15 | 27 | 7 | 8 | 2 | — | | 13 | 2 | — | | 113 | 26 |
| Career total | | | 443 | 88 | 56 | 16 | 55 | 14 | 29 | 4 | 102 | 19 | 4 | 1 | 689 | 143 |

=== International ===
Appearances and goals by national team and year
| National team | Year | Apps | Goals |
|---|---|---|---|
| Brazil | 2011 | 10 | 1 |
| Brazil | 2012 | 12 | 2 |
| Brazil | 2013 | 9 | 1 |
| Brazil | 2014 | 0 | 0 |
| Brazil | 2015 | 2 | 0 |
| Brazil | 2016 | 1 | 0 |
| Brazil | 2017 | 0 | 0 |
| Brazil | 2018 | 1 | 0 |
| Brazil | 2019 | 0 | 0 |
| Brazil | 2020 | 0 | 0 |
| Brazil | 2021 | 0 | 0 |
| Brazil | 2022 | 0 | 0 |
| Brazil | 2023 | 0 | 0 |
| Brazil | 2024 | 2 | 0 |
| Total | | 37 | 4 |

Scores and results tables list Brazil's goal tally first.

List of international goals scored by Lucas Moura
| No. | Date | Venue | Opponent | Score | Result | Competition |
|---|---|---|---|---|---|---|
| 1 | 28 September 2011 | Estádio Olímpico do Pará, Belém, Brazil | Argentina | 1–0 | 2–0 | 2011 Superclásico de las Américas |
| 2 | 10 September 2012 | Estádio do Arruda, Recife, Brazil | China | 3–0 | 8–0 | Friendly |
| 3 | 11 October 2012 | Swedbank Stadion, Malmö, Sweden | Iraq | 6–0 | 6–0 | Friendly |
| 4 | 9 June 2013 | Arena do Grêmio, Porto Alegre, Brazil | France | 3–0 | 3–0 | Friendly |

== Honours ==
São Paulo U20

- Copa São Paulo de Futebol Júnior: 2010

São Paulo

- Copa Sudamericana: 2012
- Copa do Brasil: 2023
- Supercopa do Brasil: 2024

Paris Saint-Germain

- Ligue 1: 2012–13, 2013–14, 2014–15, 2015–16
- Coupe de France: 2014–15, 2015–16, 2016–17
- Coupe de la Ligue: 2013–14, 2014–15, 2015–16, 2016–17
- Trophée des Champions: 2013, 2014, 2015, 2016

Tottenham Hotspur

- EFL Cup runner-up: 2020–21
- UEFA Champions League runner-up: 2018–19

Brazil U20

- South American U-20 Championship: 2011

Brazil U23

- Summer Olympic silver medal: 2012

Brazil

- FIFA Confederations Cup: 2013

Individual

- Copa São Paulo de Futebol Júnior Player of the Tournament: 2010
- Campeonato Paulista Breakthrough Player: 2011
- Campeonato Paulista Best Midfielder (Mesa Redonda and Diário de São Paulo): 2011
- South American U-20 Championship Best Midfielder: 2011
- South American U-20 Championship Best Player in the Final: 2011
- Campeonato Brasileiro Série A Team of the Year: 2012
- Bola de Prata: 2012
- UNFP Ligue 1 Player of the Month: October 2014
- Premier League Player of the Month: August 2018
- UEFA Champions League Squad of the Season: 2018–19
- Best Right Winger in Brazil: 2023

== See also ==
- List of Paris Saint-Germain FC players
