= Lanka de Alwis =

Sri Lankan cricketer

Lanka de Alwis was a Sri Lankan cricketer. He was a wicket-keeper who played for Moratuwa Sports Club.

De Alwis made a single first-class appearance for the side, during the 1995–96 season, against Singha Sports Club. From the tailend, he scored 8 not out in the first innings in which he batted, and 6 not out in the second.

Moratuwa lost the match by an innings margin.
