= Alves da Silva =

Alves da Silva is a combined surname. Notable people with the surname include:

- Adson Alves da Silva (born 1982), Brazilian footballer
- Alexandre Alves da Silva (born 1981), Brazilian footballer
- Cintia Alves da Silva, Brazilian linguist and semiotician
- Daniel Alves da Silva (born 1983), Brazilian footballer
- Eduardo Alves da Silva (born 1983), Brazilian-born Croatian footballer
- Giovane Alves da Silva (born 1982), Brazilian footballer
- Pedro Alves da Silva (born 1981), Brazilian footballer
- Paulo Ricardo Alves da Silva (born 1987), Brazilian footballer
- Simone Alves da Silva (born 1984), Brazilian long-distance runner

== See also ==
- Alves
- Silva
