= Thiago Alves =

Thiago Alves may refer to:

- Thiago Alves (tennis) (born 1982), Brazilian tennis player
- Thiago Alves (fighter) (born 1983), Brazilian mixed martial artist
- Thiago Soares Alves (born 1986), Brazilian volleyball player

== See also ==
- Tiago Alves (disambiguation)
