= Marquinhos =

Brazilian footballer (born 1994)

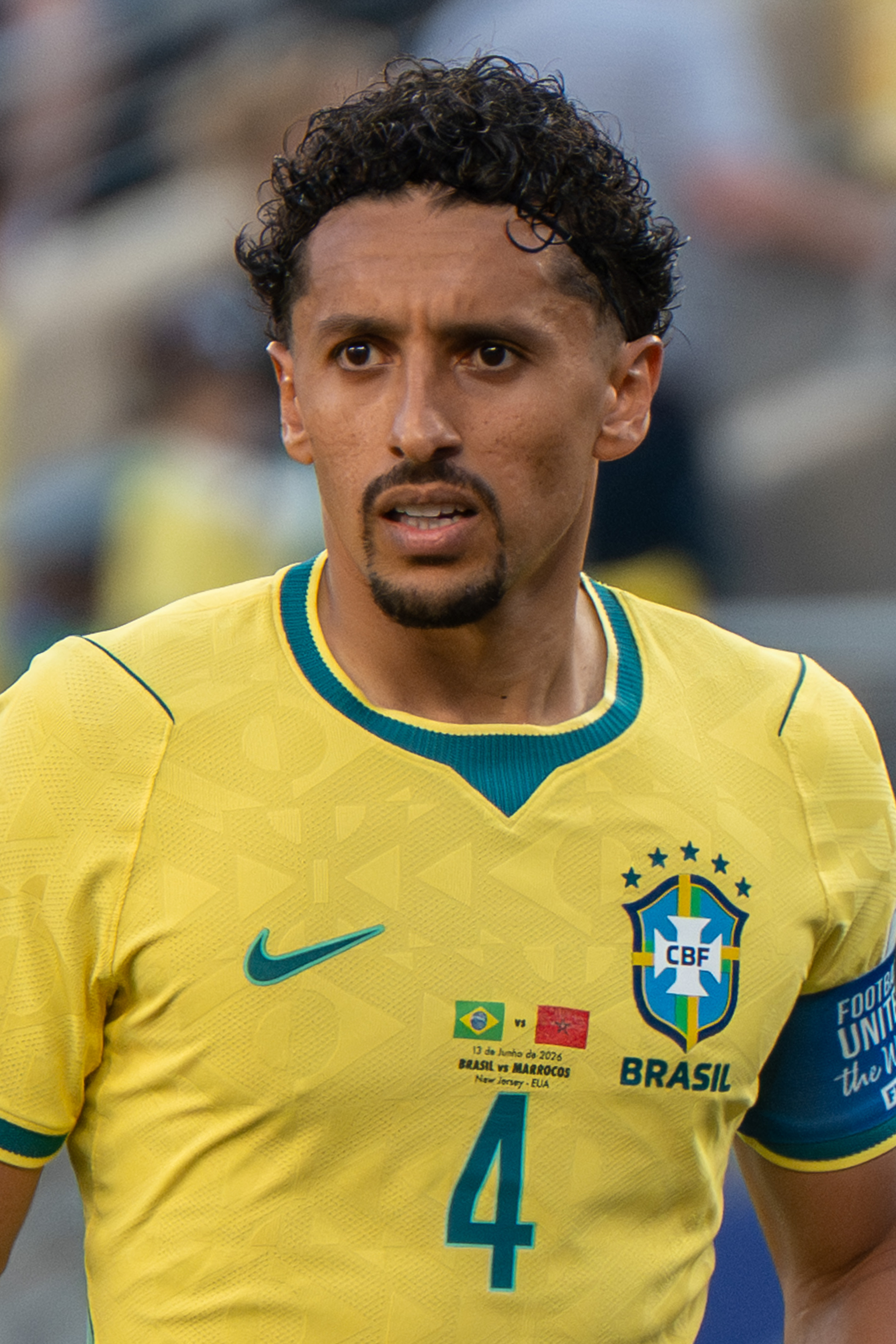
- Marquinhos with Brazil in 2026

Personal information
- Full name: Marcos Aoás Corrêa
- Date of birth: 14 May 1994 (age 32)
- Place of birth: São Paulo, Brazil
- Height: 1.83 m (6 ft 0 in)
- Position: Centre-back

Team information
- Current team: Paris Saint-Germain
- Number: 5

Youth career
- 2002–2011: Corinthians

Senior career*
Years	Team	Apps	(Gls)
2012–2013	Corinthians	14	(0)
2012–2013	→ Roma (loan)	16	(0)
2013	Roma	10	(0)
2013–	Paris Saint-Germain	332	(29)

International career^{‡}
2011	Brazil U17	14	(0)
2014	Brazil U20	5	(0)
2016	Brazil Olympic	6	(1)
2013–	Brazil	112	(7)
Medal record
Men's football
Representing Brazil
Copa América
Winner	2019 Brazil
Runner-up	2021 Brazil
Olympic Games
Gold medal – first place	2016 Rio de Janeiro	Team
- * Club domestic league appearances and goals as of 21:48, 21 November 2026 (UTC) ‡ National team caps and goals as of 17:34, 6 October 2026 (UTC)

Marcos Aoás Corrêa (born 14 May 1994), better known as Marquinhos (Brazilian Portuguese: [maʁˈkĩɲus]), is a Brazilian professional footballer who plays as a centre-back for and captains both Ligue 1 club Paris Saint-Germain and the Brazil national team.

Marquinhos began his career at Corinthians, and after winning the 2012 Copa Libertadores he moved to Roma for an eventual fee of €3 million. He was a regular in his only season as Roma reached the Coppa Italia final. In July 2013, he moved to PSG for €31.4 million, one of the highest fees for a player under the age of 20. Marquinhos played less frequently after the acquisition of compatriot David Luiz in 2014, returning to an integral role after the latter was sold in 2016. He was part of PSG's team that reached the 2020 UEFA Champions League final. After Thiago Silva's departure in August 2020, he took up the role of captain. He captained PSG to their first UEFA Champions League titles back-to-back in 2025 and 2026, with the former being part of a continental treble. In total with PSG, Marquinhos has won a record 11 Ligue 1 titles, 14 domestic cups, and two Champions League titles. He ranks top for all-time appearances for the club, with over 500.

Marquinhos made his full international debut for Brazil in 2013, and was part of their under-21 side which won the 2014 Toulon Tournament. He also represented the nation at the 2015 Copa América and the following year's Copa América Centenario, and won a gold medal at the 2016 Olympics. He subsequently took part in three FIFA World Cups (2018, 2022, and 2026) and three additional Copas América (2019, 2021, and 2024), winning the 2019 title.

== Club career ==
=== Corinthians ===
Marquinhos joined Corinthians at the age of eight in 2002. After winning the state junior cup, he was first included in a senior matchday squad on 29 January 2012, remaining an unused substitute in their 1–0 home win over Linense in the Campeonato Paulista. He made his professional debut in the competition on 18 February, playing the full 90 minutes of a victory by the same score at São Caetano. He made eight appearances across the season, as the Timão topped the table in the regular season but were defeated by Ponte Preta in the play-offs quarter-finals.

After the conclusion of the state championship, Marquinhos made his Campeonato Brasileiro Série A debut on 20 May 2012, playing the full 90 minutes in a 0–1 loss to Fluminense at the Paulo Machado de Carvalho Stadium; both teams were resting players in the first game of the season due to concentration on the Copa Libertadores. He played six games in the national championship, and was an unused substitute as the club won the 2012 Copa Libertadores Finals against Boca Juniors.

=== Roma ===
In July 2012, Marquinhos was signed by Italian club Roma from Corinthians. The transfer was initially a one-year loan for a fee of €1.5 million, rising to €3 million after he made eight first-team appearances of at least 45 minutes each. At Roma, he played under the name "Marcos" printed on his jersey to avoid confusion with teammate Marquinho.

Marquinhos made his debut on 16 September in a 2–3 loss against Bologna at the Stadio Olimpico, sent on by manager Zdeněk Zeman to replace Iván Piris for the match's final 15 minutes. By October, Zeman decided to partner Marquinhos for his speed alongside former Corinthians teammate and fellow Brazilian Leandro Castán in central defence, demoting former starter Nicolás Burdisso to the substitutes' bench. He given a straight red card in a 4–2 victory over Milan on 22 December when he was judged to have denied Stephan El Shaarawy a clear goalscoring opportunity.

Marquinhos played 26 Serie A games in his only season, and four in the Coppa Italia. This included the full 90 minutes of the final on 26 May, playing at right back as Roma lost 0–1 to Rome rivals Lazio.

=== Paris Saint-Germain ===
==== 2013–2016: First seasons and starting XI competition ====
On 19 July 2013, Marquinhos signed a five-year deal with French side Paris Saint-Germain for a fee of €31.45 million. According to BBC Sport, this was then the highest transfer fee for a teenager, although Sky Sports report it as then the fifth-highest such transfer, and France's Le 10 Sport record it as the third-highest. French news channel BFM TV described the transfer as the fifth most expensive of all time for a defender, after those of Rio Ferdinand, Thiago Silva, Lilian Thuram and Dani Alves. Marquinhos' transfer was threatened by anomalies in his medical exam, and he missed the team's pre-season visit to Sweden. His mother said that he had caught a virus, with PSG denying claims circulated by Le Parisien that he had hepatitis.

On his official debut for the club on 17 September, Marquinhos scored his first professional goal to confirm a 4–1 win against Olympiacos at the Karaiskakis Stadium in the group stage of the 2013–14 UEFA Champions League. Five days later, Marquinhos made his Ligue 1 debut as a starter in a 1–1 draw against Monaco. His first league goal for the club came on 28 September, the first in a 2–0 win over Toulouse. On 2 October, he scored the second goal in a 3–0 Champions League group victory against Benfica. Marquinhos, who was playing due to injury to Thiago Silva, expressed surprise at his goalscoring form at the start of his PSG career. Marquinhos scored the last goal of PSG's 6–1 aggregate win over Bayer Leverkusen in the last 16 of the Champions League on 12 March 2014, and was an unused substitute as they won the Coupe de la Ligue final against Lyon on 19 April. On 10 May, he scored the opening goal of a 3–1 win over Lille, which put by-then league champions PSG to a record league points tally of 86 with a game left to play.

Marquinhos began the 2014–15 season on 2 August in the Trophée des Champions, playing the whole 90 minutes as PSG won 2–0 against Guingamp at the Workers Stadium in Beijing. In the 32nd minute, he gave away a penalty kick by fouling Claudio Beauvue, but Salvatore Sirigu saved the penalty shot from Mustapha Yatabaré. His first goal of the season came in a 2–0 win at Caen on 24 September, heading in Javier Pastore's corner. On 26 March 2015, Marquinhos signed a one-year contract extension to keep him at the team until 2019. Club president Nasser Al-Khelaifi said that, "The biggest European clubs were interested in signing Marquinhos, so this contract extension further reinforces Paris Saint-Germain's ambitious long-term project." As the right-back in an all-Brazilian defence (alongside Maxwell, Thiago Silva and David Luiz), Marquinhos featured in PSG's 3–2 win at Marseille in Le Classique, scoring the equaliser. Six days later, he started in the 4–0 victory over Bastia in the 2015 Coupe de la Ligue, his 34th consecutive game without a defeat for the club, surpassing a record set by George Weah. On 16 May, PSG won their third consecutive league title with a 2–1 victory at Montpellier, with Marquinhos playing the final 12 minutes in place of Yohan Cabaye. Two weeks later, he was an unused substitute as the team finished a perfect domestic season with victory in the Coupe de France final against Auxerre.

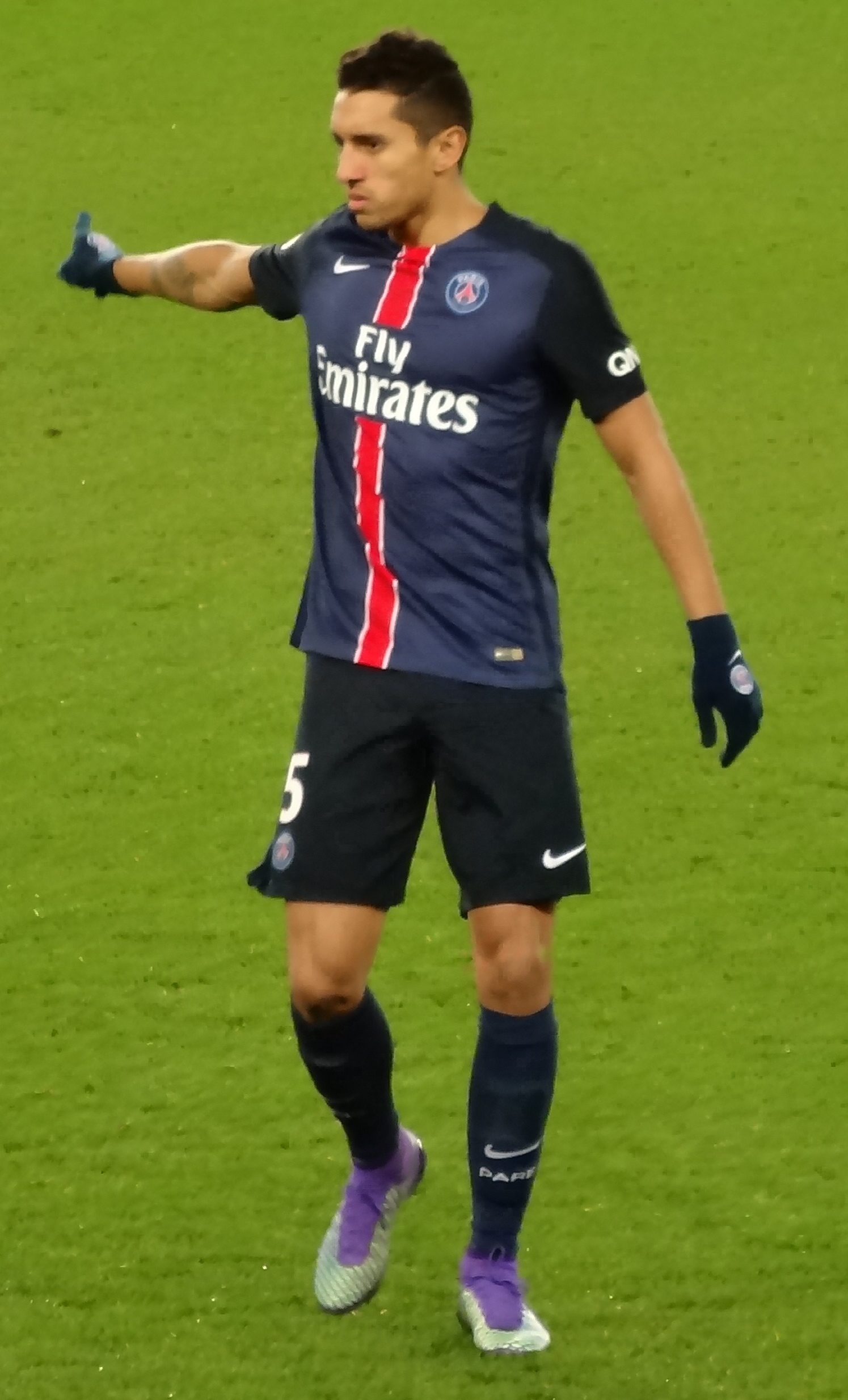
Marquinhos playing for Paris Saint-Germain in 2016

PSG began the 2015–16 season with a 2–0 victory over Lyon in the 2015 Trophée des Champions, with Marquinhos an unused substitute as Serge Aurier played at right back. At the end of the summer transfer window, Chelsea had two bids rejected for his signature, of amounts between £25.7–£40.4 million. Marquinhos rarely started during the season, due to the partnership of his compatriots Silva and David Luiz in the centre of the PSG defence. One of the team's former defenders, Alex, recommended that Marquinhos leave the team, as he was in demand from big teams in which he would have an opportunity to play. In February 2016, Silva criticised the agency representing Marquinhos and David Luiz for having led two players of the same position to the same club, thus limiting Marquinhos' opportunities; Silva mentioned Barcelona's interest in the player. PSG manager Laurent Blanc stated that he would be open for Marquinhos to leave at the end of the season, while agent Giuliano Bertolucci confirmed that Marquinhos would be leaving.

On 2 March, Marquinhos scored his first goal of the season as PSG won 3–1 at Saint-Étienne in the cup quarter-finals. On 23 April, he played the entirety of a 2–1 win over Lille in the 2016 Coupe de la Ligue Final, and he did so again on 21 May in the Coupe de France final, a 4–2 win over Marseille, as PSG won all four domestic trophies for the second consecutive season.

==== 2016–2020: Sustained domestic success and European final ====
Marquinhos missed PSG's victory in the 2016 Trophée des Champions in August due to his selection in the Brazil team at the Olympics. He was tipped by ESPN journalist Jonathan Johnson to play more frequently over the season, as new manager Unai Emery sold David Luiz back to Chelsea. He scored his first goal of the season on 26 February 2017, opening a 5–1 win at rivals Marseille; prior to the game he confirmed that he was in talks for a new contract at the club. On 26 April, he scored the last goal of a 5–0 home win over title rivals Monaco in the Coupe de France semi-finals, and he started beside Silva in a 1–0 win over Angers a month later in the final. Marquinhos said on 14 May that there was a "100 percent" chance he would remain at the club the following season.

Marquinhos began the 2017–18 season on 29 July, starting as PSG won 2–1 in the 2017 Trophée des Champions at the Grand Stade de Tanger in Morocco. In the team's victorious run in the Coupe de la Ligue, he scored in the 3–2 semi-final win at Rennes on 30 January 2018, but was unused in the 3–0 final win over Monaco as young local Presnel Kimpembe took his place. PSG won all four domestic competitions over the season, and Marquinhos told Le Figaro at the end of the campaign that he would remain at the club.

On 12 August 2020, Marquinhos scored a late equaliser against Atalanta in the Champions League quarter-finals, sparking a late comeback for PSG to win 2–1. On 18 August, he scored in a 3–0 win over RB Leipzig in the semi-finals of the competition, which saw PSG reach the Champions League final for the first time in its history. PSG eventually lost out 1–0 to Bayern Munich on 23 August.

==== 2020–present: Club captain and first Champions League titles ====
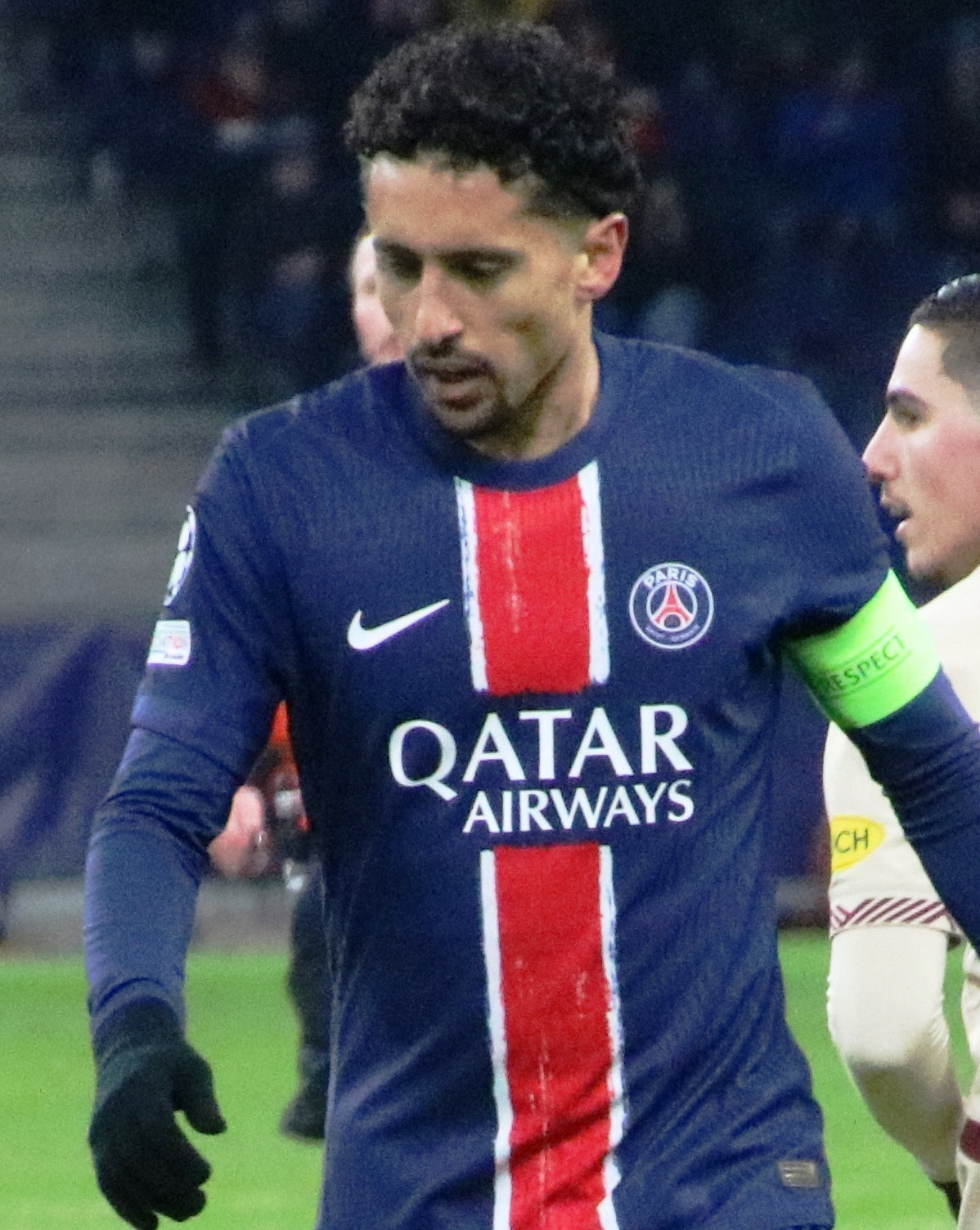
Marquinhos playing for Paris Saint-Germain in 2024

Marquinhos was appointed as PSG's club captain on 15 September 2020, succeeding Thiago Silva in the role. He scored his first goal of the season in a match against Nice five days later. On 2 December, Marquinhos scored the second goal for PSG in a 3–1 win against Manchester United in the UEFA Champions League group stage. In January 2021, he made his 300th PSG appearance in a 2–1 Trophée des Champions victory over Marseille, also entering the club's top ten appearance makers of all time.

On 19 May 2023, Marquinhos signed a new long-term contract at PSG until June 2028, which, if fulfilled, would see him to his fifteenth year at the club. On 6 April 2024, he featured in his 435th match for PSG against Clermont, equaling Jean-Marc Pilorget's record of all-time appearances. Four days later, he surpassed him by appearing in his 436th match against Barcelona in the quarter-finals of the UEFA Champions League.

Marquinhos began the season on 16 August 2024, coming on as a substitute in a 4–1 away win against Le Havre. He played his first Champions League game of the season on 18 September in a 1–0 win against Girona. On 1 February 2025, he featured in his 100th Champions League match in a 3–0 away win over Brest during the knockout play-offs. A month later, on 1 March, he scored his first goal of the season in a 4–1 win against Lille.

Marquinhos captained PSG to their first-ever Champions League title with a commanding 5–0 win over Inter Milan in the final. The victory completed a historic continental treble, as the club had already secured the Ligue 1 title and the Coupe de France.

On 26 November 2025, Marquinhos made his 500th PSG appearance in a 5–3 home win against Tottenham Hotspur in the UEFA Champions League league phase. On 28 April 2026, he made his 120th Champions League appearance in a 5–4 semi-final first-leg victory over Bayern Munich, equaling the Brazilian record of Roberto Carlos for most appearances in the competition. He surpassed the record a week later, on 6 May, by making his 121st appearance in a 1–1 away draw against Bayern, becoming the Brazilian with the most appearances in the competition's history. Later that month, on 30 May, he captained his team to their second UEFA Champions League title, defeating Arsenal in the final 4–3 on penalties after a 1–1 draw following extra time.

== International career ==
=== Youth and first caps ===
Marquinhos played every minute of Brazil's campaign at the 2011 South American Under-17 Football Championship, as they won and qualified for that year's World Cup in that category. He was again an undisputed starter except for one match at that tournament, as the team took fourth place in Mexico.

In October 2013, Marquinhos, who is of dual Portuguese and Brazilian nationality, stated that he would be open to representing the Portugal national team. However, later that month, he received his first call-up for Brazil when Luiz Felipe Scolari named his squad for friendly matches against Honduras and Chile to be played that November. He made his debut against Honduras in Miami on 16 November, replacing David Luiz for the last 20 minutes of a 5–0 win.

Marquinhos played for Brazil Under-21 at the 2014 Toulon Tournament, featuring in all five of their matches as the country won the tournament. He scored to put Brazil 3–2 up in their eventual 5–2 win in the final over France.

=== 2016: Olympic gold and Copa América Centenario ===
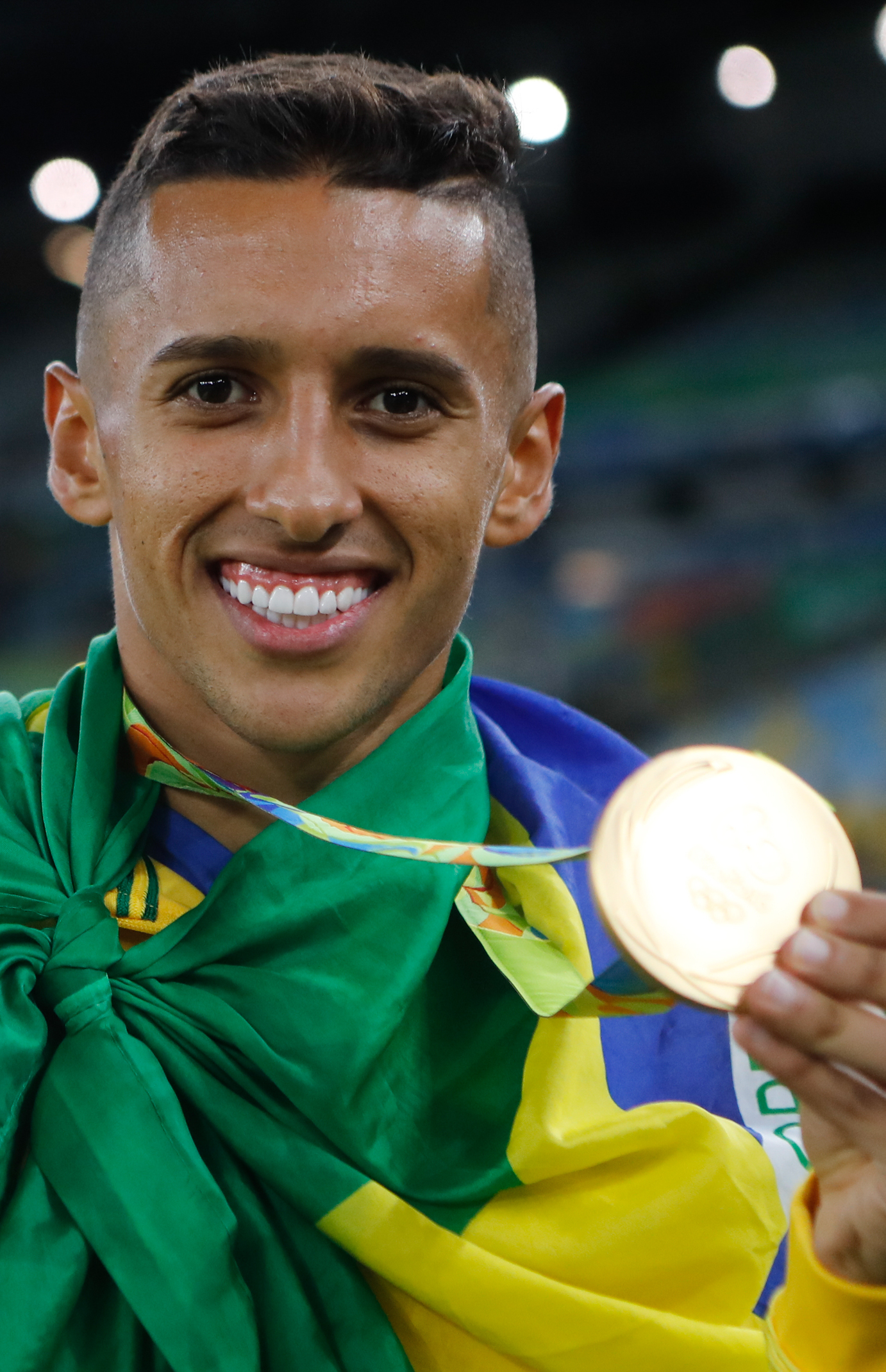
Marquinhos holding his gold medal from the 2016 Summer Olympics

After missing the 2014 FIFA World Cup on home soil, Marquinhos returned to the senior side in September 2014 under new manager Dunga. He featured in friendly wins over Colombia and Ecuador in Miami, making his first start against the latter. Marquinhos was included in the Brazilian squad for the 2015 Copa América in Chile, his first major international tournament. He made his competitive debut – and only appearance in the tournament – on 21 June in their final group match at the Estadio Monumental David Arellano, replacing Robinho for the final 14 minutes of a 2–1 win over Venezuela which sent Brazil into the quarter-finals as group winners.

In 2016, Marquinhos was named in the Brazilian squad for the Copa América Centenario in the United States, an "experimental" selection lacking his Paris Saint-Germain defensive partners Thiago Silva and David Luiz. He played in the first two games at centre-back alongside Gil before being replaced by Miranda for the last group game, a 1–0 loss to Peru at Gillette Stadium that eliminated his team. Later that year, he was included in the squad for the team's hosting of the Olympic tournament, and in the semi-final against Honduras in Rio de Janeiro, he scored in an eventual 6–0 win.

=== 2018 World Cup and 2019 Copa América victory ===
With Silva injured, Marquinhos captained Brazil for the first time on 10 October 2017 in a 3–0 win over Chile at Allianz Parque in his hometown. Brazil had already qualified for the 2018 FIFA World Cup and the result ended the continental champion opponents' hope of qualification. In May 2018 he was named in manager Tite's 23-man squad for the final tournament in Russia, alongside clubmates Silva and Neymar. He scored his first international goal on 11 September, in a 5–0 friendly win over El Salvador.

In May 2019, Marquinhos was included in Brazil's 23-man squad for the 2019 Copa América on home soil. In the semi-finals against Argentina on 2 July, Marquinhos was tasked with marking Lionel Messi while suffering from diarrhoea. He helped Brazil to a 2–0 victory over their rivals; he came off in second half for Miranda. On 7 July, Marquinhos started in Brazil's 3–1 win over Peru in the final at the Maracanã Stadium.

On 9 October 2020, Marquinhos scored his first competitive goal for Brazil, heading the opener of a 5–0 win over Bolivia at Corinthians' ground, in 2022 FIFA World Cup qualification. The following month, he earned his 50th cap in another qualifier against Venezuela.

=== 2021 Copa América and 2022 World Cup ===
On 14 June 2021, Marquinhos scored Brazil's opener in their first group stage match of the 2021 Copa América, a 3–0 win against Venezuela. On 10 July, he started in his nation's 1–0 defeat to rivals Argentina in the final.

On 7 November 2022, Marquinhos was named in the squad for the 2022 FIFA World Cup. In Brazil's quarter-final against Croatia, Marquinhos was their fourth kicker in the penalty shootout after a 1–1 draw, hitting the goalpost and sealing Brazil's loss.

=== 2024 Copa América and 2026 World Cup ===
On 24 June 2024, Marquinhos played in Brazil’s opening group stage match of the 2024 Copa América against Costa Rica. He would go on to start in all four of Brazil’s matches as they disappointed in the tournament, losing in the quarter-finals to Uruguay on penalties.

On 4 September 2025, Marquinhos featured in his 100th international match in a 3–0 victory over Chile during the 2026 FIFA World Cup qualification. On 18 May 2026, he was named in the 26-man squad for the 2026 FIFA World Cup.

== Style of play ==
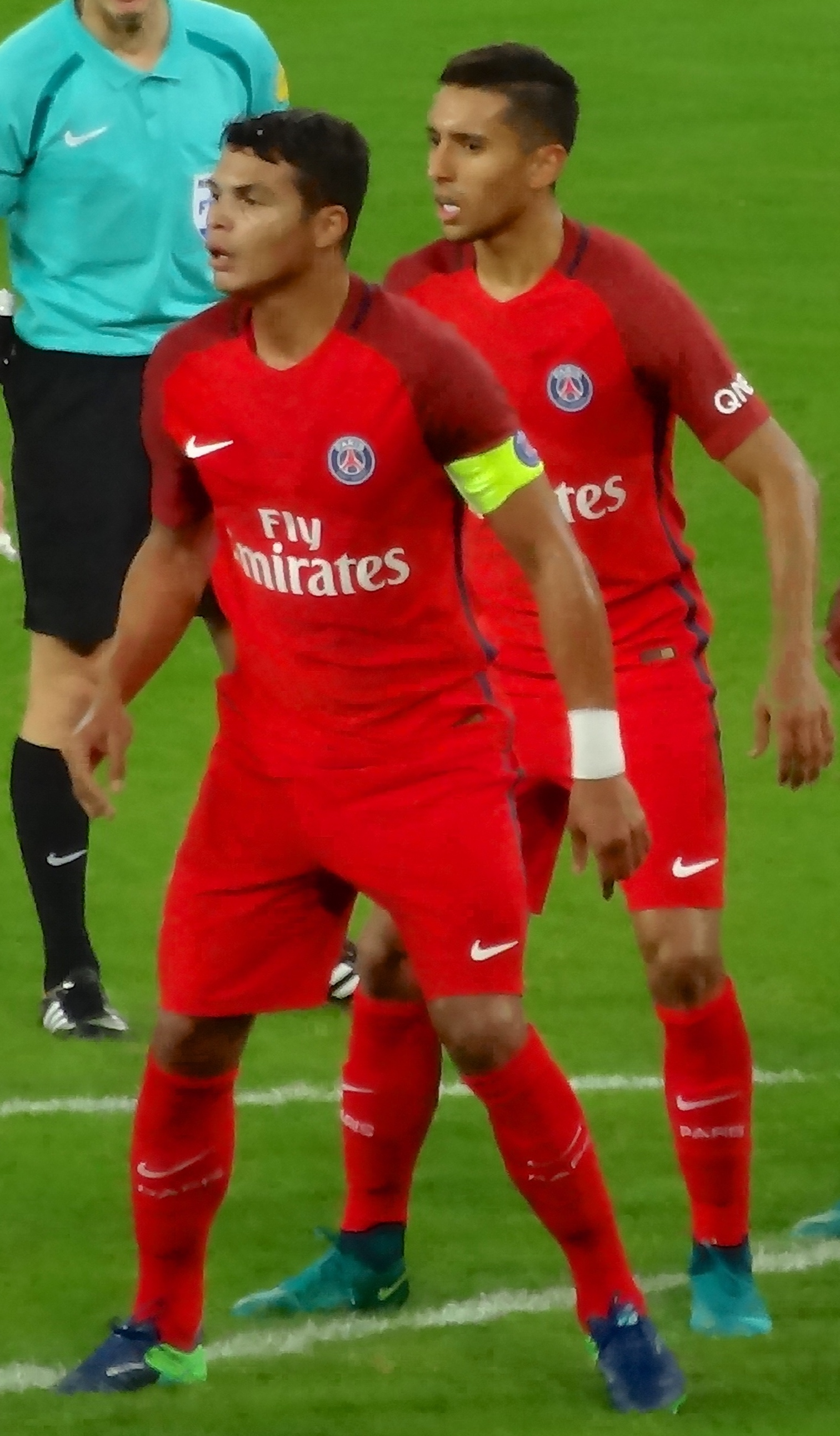
Marquinhos (right) has been likened to Thiago Silva (left), who was his club and international teammate.

In terms of his playing position, Marquinhos is predominantly deployed as a central defender, but has also been used at right-back and in a central or defensive midfield role. He is noted for his anticipation, pace, and intelligence, as well as his technical skills, composure, passing ability, elegance on the ball, and confidence in possession, which enables him to break down attacks and subsequently play the ball out or start offensive plays from the back.

On signing for Roma, Marquinhos described himself as a quick player, with a good positional sense, who wins back a lot of balls, and who can impose himself on a game due to his ability to start attacking plays from the back. He named Thiago Silva as his role model. In March 2015, Marquinhos told FourFourTwo that he compensated for his average height for a defender by honing his strength and timing, attributes he learnt from PSG assistant manager Claude Makélélé. He praised manager Laurent Blanc, a former defender himself, for encouraging the PSG defenders to attack in set pieces and teaching them the correct positioning in that situation.

Fellow Roma defender Nicolás Burdisso said in August 2012 that Marquinhos was "a little phenomenon. He has speed, heading ability, he knows what to do, he is humble. He is a little Thiago Silva".

In January 2014, Marquinhos was named by British newspaper The Observer as one of the ten most promising young players in Europe. They wrote, "He has the temperament to remain undaunted, the talent to succeed, and could benefit from playing alongside his club team-mate, Thiago Silva, with whom he enjoys a solid understanding at wealthy Paris Saint-Germain."

== Personal life ==
In May 2015, Marquinhos told Le Parisien that he had become engaged to Brazilian singer and reality television contestant Carol Cabrino. He proposed to her underneath the Eiffel Tower. They had a civil wedding in June 2016. Their daughter was born on 1 November 2017, with Cabrino having gone early into labour while watching Marquinhos playing a Champions League match against Anderlecht at the Parc des Princes. Their second child (a boy) was born in December 2019, and their third (a girl) in April 2022. Their fourth child (a boy) was born in March 2026.

During a match between PSG and Nantes on 14 March 2021, Marquinhos' parents were held hostage in a robbery. This came alongside teammate Ángel Di María's family being held hostage in a robbery at the same time.

== Career statistics ==
=== Club ===
As of match played 21 November 2026

Appearances and goals by club, season and competition
Club	Season	League			National cup (Note: Includes Coppa Italia, Coupe de France)		League cup (Note: Includes Coupe de la Ligue)		Continental		Other		Total	
Club	Season	Division	Apps	Goals	Apps	Goals	Apps	Goals	Apps	Goals	Apps	Goals	Apps	Goals
Corinthians	2012	Série A	6	0	—		—		0	0	8 (Note: Appearances in Campeonato Paulista)	0	14	0
Roma	2012–13	Serie A	26	0	4	0	—		—		—		30	0
Paris Saint-Germain	2013–14	Ligue 1	21	2	1	0	2	0	8 (Note: Appearances in UEFA Champions League)	3	0	0	32	5
Paris Saint-Germain	2014–15	Ligue 1	25	2	5	0	4	0	7	0	1 (Note: Appearance in Trophée des Champions)	0	42	2
Paris Saint-Germain	2015–16	Ligue 1	29	1	5	1	3	0	6	0	0	0	43	2
Paris Saint-Germain	2016–17	Ligue 1	29	3	5	1	2	0	8	0	0	0	44	4
Paris Saint-Germain	2017–18	Ligue 1	26	0	3	1	3	1	8	0	1	0	41	2
Paris Saint-Germain	2018–19	Ligue 1	30	3	4	0	2	0	7	1	1	0	44	4
Paris Saint-Germain	2019–20	Ligue 1	19	3	2	0	4	1	11	2	1	0	37	6
Paris Saint-Germain	2020–21	Ligue 1	25	3	4	0	—		10	3	1	0	40	6
Paris Saint-Germain	2021–22	Ligue 1	32	5	0	0	—		8	0	0	0	40	5
Paris Saint-Germain	2022–23	Ligue 1	33	2	2	0	—		8	0	1	0	44	2
Paris Saint-Germain	2023–24	Ligue 1	21	0	4	0	—		10	0	1	0	36	0
Paris Saint-Germain	2024–25	Ligue 1	22	2	3	1	—		16	0	7 (Note: One appearance in Trophée des Champions, six appearances in FIFA Club World Cup)	0	48	3
Paris Saint-Germain	2025–26	Ligue 1	14	0	0	0	—		15	2	3 (Note: One appearance in UEFA Super Cup, one appearance in FIFA Intercontinental Cup, one appearance in Trophée des Champions)	0	32	2
Paris Saint-Germain	2026–27	Ligue 1	6	3	0	0	—		2	0	1 (Note: Appearance in UEFA Super Cup)	0	9	3
Paris Saint-Germain	Total		332	29	38	4	20	2	124	11	18	0	532	46
Career total			364	29	42	4	20	2	124	11	26	0	576	46

=== International ===
As of match played 3 October 2026

Appearances and goals by national team and year
National team	Year	Apps	Goals
Brazil	2013	1	0
Brazil	2014	3	0
Brazil	2015	5	0
Brazil	2016	8	0
Brazil	2017	7	0
Brazil	2018	9	1
Brazil	2019	14	0
Brazil	2020	4	1
Brazil	2021	13	2
Brazil	2022	12	1
Brazil	2023	8	2
Brazil	2024	11	0
Brazil	2025	8	0
Brazil	2026	9	0
Total		112	7

As of match played 24 June 2026.
Scores and results list Brazil's goal tally first, score column indicates score after each Marquinhos goal.

List of international goals scored by Marquinhos
No.	Date	Venue	Cap	Opponent	Score	Result	Competition
1	11 September 2018	FedExField, Landover, United States	29	El Salvador	5–0	5–0	Friendly
2	9 October 2020	Neo Química Arena, São Paulo, Brazil	48	Bolivia	1–0	5–0	2022 FIFA World Cup qualification
3	13 June 2021	Estádio Nacional Mané Garrincha, Brasília, Brazil	54	Venezuela	1–0	3–0	2021 Copa América
4	7 October 2021	Estadio Olímpico de la UCV, Caracas, Venezuela	61	Venezuela	1–1	3–1	2022 FIFA World Cup qualification
5	23 September 2022	Stade Océane, Le Havre, France	70	Ghana	1–0	3–0	Friendly
6	20 June 2023	Estádio José Alvalade, Lisbon, Portugal	78	Senegal	2–3	2–4	Friendly
7	12 September 2023	Estadio Nacional de Lima, Lima, Peru	80	Peru	1–0	1–0	2026 FIFA World Cup qualification

== Honours ==
Corinthians

- Copa Libertadores: 2012

Paris Saint-Germain

- Ligue 1: 2013–14, 2014–15, 2015–16, 2017–18, 2018–19, 2019–20, 2021–22, 2022–23, 2023–24, 2024–25, 2025–26
- Coupe de France: 2014–15, 2015–16, 2016–17, 2017–18, 2019–20, 2020–21, 2023–24, 2024–25; runner-up: 2018–19
- Coupe de la Ligue: 2013–14, 2014–15, 2015–16, 2016–17, 2017–18, 2019–20
- Trophée des Champions: 2014, 2015, 2017, 2018, 2019, 2020, 2022, 2023, 2024, 2025
- UEFA Champions League: 2024–25, 2025–26; runner-up: 2019–20
- UEFA Super Cup: 2025, 2026
- FIFA Intercontinental Cup: 2025
- FIFA Club World Cup runner-up: 2025

Brazil U17

- South American Under-17 Championship: 2011

Brazil U23

- Olympic Gold Medal: 2016

Brazil

- Copa América: 2019

Individual

- UNFP Ligue 1 Team of the Year: 2017–18, 2018–19, 2020–21, 2021–22, 2023–24, 2024–25
- UEFA Champions League Squad/Team of the Season: 2019–20, 2020–21, 2024–25, 2025–26
- Copa América Team of the Tournament: 2021
- IFFHS Team of the Copa América: 2021
- IFFHS CONMEBOL Team of the Year: 2020, 2021
- FIFA Club World Cup Team of the Tournament: 2025
- UEFA Respect: Beyond the Game Award: 2026

== See also ==
- List of men's footballers with 100 or more international caps
