= Stanley de Alwis =

Sri Lankan cricketer (1936–2019)

Personal information
- Full name: James Stanley de Alwis
- Born: 26 February 1936; Moratuwa, Ceylon
- Died: September 2019 (aged 83); Colombo, Sri Lanka
- Batting: Left-handed
- Bowling: Right-arm fast-medium

Career statistics
Competition	First-class
Matches	5
Runs scored	67
Batting average	22.33
100s/50s	0/0
Top score	29
Balls bowled	844
Wickets	11
Bowling average	28.63
5 wickets in innings	0
10 wickets in match	0
Best bowling	4/20
Catches/stumpings	1/–
- Source: Cricinfo, 7 July 2020

Stanley de Alwis (26 February 1936 – September 2019) was a cricketer who played first-class cricket for Ceylon between 1958 and 1960.

An opening bowler, de Alwis took 4 for 20 on his first-class debut in the Gopalan Trophy match in 1957–58. He gave up sport in 1961 at the age of 25 after contracting hepatitis.

He later worked at the Prisons Department and then at the People's Bank. He died in Colombo in September 2019. He and his wife, who predeceased him by about 20 years, had two daughters.
