= Francisco Alves (water polo) =

Portuguese water polo player (1923–1991)

Personal information
- Full name: Francisco Ferreira Alves
- Nationality: Portuguese
- Born: 24 May 1923 Cruz Quebrada-Dafundo, Portugal
- Died: 23 August 1991 (aged 68) Alcântara, Lisbon, Portugal

Sport
- Sport: Water polo

Francisco Alves (24 May 1923 – 23 August 1991) was a Portuguese water polo player. He competed in the men's tournament at the 1952 Summer Olympics. In 1987, he was a recipient of the Silver Olympic Order, which is the highest award of the Olympic Movement. Alves died in Alcântara, Lisbon on 23 August 1991, at the age of 68.
