= Ugleno Alves =

Brazilian politician (born 1994)

Member of the Legislative Assembly of Minas Gerais
- Incumbent
- Assumed office 1 February 2027

Personal details
- Born: 24 October 1994 (age 32)
- Party: Liberal Party

Ugleno Alves Pereira Santos (born 24 October 1994) is a Brazilian politician who was elected member of the Legislative Assembly of Minas Gerais in 2026. He is the speaker of the Municipal Chamber of Teófilo Otoni.
