= 2016–17 En Avant de Guingamp season =

Guingamp
2016–17 season
- Chairman: Bertrand Desplat
- Manager: Antoine Kombouaré
- Stadium: Stade de Roudourou
- Ligue 1: 10th
- Coupe de France: Semi-finals
- Coupe de la Ligue: Quarter-finals
- Top goalscorer: League: Jimmy Briand (12); All: Jimmy Briand (13)
- Highest home attendance: 18,033 vs Paris (17 December 2016)
- Lowest home attendance: 12,630 vs Montpellier HSC (10 September 2016)
- Average home league attendance: 14,501
| Home colours | Away colours |

The 2016–17 En Avant de Guingamp season is the 105th professional season of the club since its creation in 1912.

== Current squad ==
As of 30 August 2016.

Note: Flags indicate national team as defined under FIFA eligibility rules; some limited exceptions apply. Players may hold more than one non-FIFA nationality.

| No. | Pos. | Nation | Player |
|---|---|---|---|
| 1 | GK | SWE | Karl-Johan Johnsson |
| 2 | DF | COD | Jordan Ikoko |
| 3 | DF | BRA | Marçal (on loan from Benfica) |
| 4 | DF | CIV | Benjamin Angoua |
| 5 | MF | SEN | Mustapha Diallo |
| 6 | DF | GUI | Baïssama Sankoh |
| 7 | DF | FRA | Dorian Lévêque |
| 8 | MF | FRA | Lucas Deaux |
| 9 | FW | FRA | Alexandre Mendy |
| 10 | MF | FRA | Nicolas Benezet |
| 11 | FW | GUF | Sloan Privat |
| 12 | MF | BEL | Nill de Pauw |
| 14 | FW | FRA | Sullivan Martinet |
| 15 | DF | FRA | Jérémy Sorbon |

| No. | Pos. | Nation | Player |
|---|---|---|---|
| 16 | GK | FRA | Théo Guivarch |
| 17 | MF | FRA | Étienne Didot |
| 19 | FW | FRA | Yannis Salibur |
| 21 | MF | FRA | Ludovic Blas |
| 22 | DF | FRA | Jonathan Martins Pereira |
| 23 | FW | FRA | Jimmy Briand (captain) |
| 24 | MF | FRA | Marcus Coco |
| 25 | DF | FRA | Reynald Lemaître |
| 26 | MF | FRA | Thibault Giresse |
| 29 | DF | FRA | Christophe Kerbrat |
| 30 | GK | FRA | Romain Salin |
| 31 | MF | FRA | Jérémy Livolant |
| 32 | MF | FRA | Alexis Mané |
| 33 | FW | MLI | Fousseni Diabaté |

Out on loan

Note: Flags indicate national team as defined under FIFA eligibility rules; some limited exceptions apply. Players may hold more than one non-FIFA nationality.

| No. / Pos. / Nation / Player; — / DF / FRA / Franck Héry (on loan to Les Herbiers) | No. / Pos. / Nation / Player; — / FW / MAR / Karim Achahbar (on loan to Quevilly-Rouen) |

== Transfers ==
Transfers in:

| No. | Pos. | Nation | Player |
|---|---|---|---|
| 1 | GK | SWE | Karl-Johan Johnsson (from (Denmark) Randers) |
| 2 | DF | COD | Jordan Ikoko (from (France) Paris Saint-Germain, previously on loan at (France) Lens) |
| 8 | MF | FRA | Lucas Déaux (from (Belgium) Gent) |
| 9 | FW | FRA | Alexandre Mendy (from (France) Nice) |
| 11 | FW | FRA | Sloan Privat (from (Belgium) Gent, previously on loan) |
| 14 | FW | FRA | Sullivan Martinet (from (France) Guingamp B) |
| 17 | MF | FRA | Étienne Didot (from (France) Toulouse) |
| 30 | GK | FRA | Romain Salin (from (Portugal) Marítimo) |

Transfers out:

| No. | Pos. | Nation | Player |
|---|---|---|---|
| 1 | GK | DEN | Jonas Lössl (to (Germany) Mainz 05) |
| 2 | DF | DEN | Lars Jacobsen (Retirement) |
| 6 | DF | FRA | Maxime Baca (Free agent) |
| 8 | MF | FRA | Julien Cardy (Free agent) |
| 9 | FW | MLI | Mana Dembélé (to (France) Le Havre) |
| 13 | MF | SEN | Younousse Sankharé (to (France) Lille) |
| 18 | MF | FRA | Lionel Mathis (to (France) Auxerre) |
| 20 | DF | FRA | Laurent Dos Santos (to (France) Strasbourg) |
| 28 | FW | TUR | Mevlüt Erdinç (loan return to (Germany) Hannover 96, later loan to (France) Metz) |
| 30 | GK | MLI | Mamadou Samassa (to (France) Troyes) |
| — | FW | FRA | Julien Bègue (to (France) Bourg-en-Bresse Péronnas, previously on loan) |
| — | FW | MAR | Rachid Alioui (to (France) Nîmes, previously on loan to (France) Laval) |
| — | FW | DEN | Ronnie Schwartz (to (Belgium) Waasland-Beveren, previously on loan to (Denmark) Esbjerg) |

Loans in:

| No. | Pos. | Nation | Player |
|---|---|---|---|
| 3 | DF | BRA | Marçal (from (Portugal) Benfica, previously on loan to (Turkey) Gaziantepspor) |

== Statistics ==
=== Goalscorers ===
Includes all competitive matches

| Rank | No. | Pos | Nat | Name | Ligue 1 | Coupe de France | Coupe de Ligue | Total |
|---|---|---|---|---|---|---|---|---|
| 1 | 23 | FW | (France) | Jimmy Briand | 6 | 1 | 0 | 7 |
| 2 | 12 | MF | (Belgium) | Nill De Pauw | 4 | 0 | 1 | 5 |
| 3 | 24 | MF | (France) | Marcus Coco | 4 | 0 | 0 | 4 |
| 3 | 19 | MF | (France) | Yannis Salibur | 4 | 0 | 0 | 4 |
| 3 | 11 | FW | (French Guiana) | Sloan Privat | 2 | 0 | 2 | 4 |
| 6 | 5 | MF | (Senegal) | Mustapha Diallo | 2 | 1 | 0 | 3 |
| 7 | 21 | MF | (France) | Ludovic Blas | 0 | 0 | 1 | 1 |
| 7 | 26 | MF | (France) | Thibault Giresse | 1 | 0 | 0 | 1 |
| 7 | 9 | FW | (France) | Alexandre Mendy | 1 | 0 | 0 | 1 |
| 7 | 15 | DF | (France) | Jérémy Sorbon | 1 | 0 | 0 | 1 |
| 7 | 10 | MF | (France) | Nicolas Benezet | 0 | 0 | 1 | 1 |
| TOTAL | | | | | 25 | 2 | 5 | 32 |

Last updated: 11 January 2017

== Pre-season and friendlies ==
| 9 July 2016 Friendly | Guingamp | 2–0 | Avranches (3) | Sarzeau |
| 16:00 CEST | Privat 52', 85' | | | Stadium: Stade Municipal |

| 16 July 2016 Friendly | Guingamp | 0–2 | Brest (2) | Plouvorn |
| 18:00 CEST | | | 59' Joseph-Monrose; 84' Henry | Stadium: Parc des sports Guy de Réals |

| 23 July 2016 Friendly | Guingamp | 2–1 | Lorient (1) | Pontivy |
| 18:00 CEST | Giresse 40' (pen.); Privat 50' | | 74' Cabot | Stadium: Stade du Faubourg de Verdun |

| 30 July 2016 Friendly | Guingamp | 2–1 | Rennes (1) | Ploufragan |
| 17:00 CEST | Privat 50' 59' | | 83' (o.g.) Johnsson | Stadium: Centre Technique Bretagne Henri Guérin |

| 3 August 2016 Friendly | Guingamp | 3–4 | Angers (1) | Vitré |
| 17:00 CEST | Sorbon 16'; Mendy 38'; Briand 90' | | 14' N'Doye; 25' Toko Ekambi; 66' (pen.) Sunu; 82' Martinez | Stadium: Stade Municipal |

| 6 August 2016 Friendly | Guingamp | 1–0 | Caen (1) | Guingamp |
| 18:30 CEST | Blas 79' | | | Stadium: Stade de Roudourou |

== Competitions ==
=== Overall ===
| Competition | Started round | Current position / round | Final position / round | First match | Last match |
|---|---|---|---|---|---|
| Ligue 1 | Matchday 1 | 5th | | 12 August 2016 | 20 May 2017 |
| Coupe de France | Round of 64 | Round of 32 | | 7 January 2017 | |
| Coupe de la Ligue | Round of 32 | — | Quarter-finals | 26 October 2016 | 11 January 2017 |

Updated to match played 11 January 2017
Source: Competitions

=== Overview ===
| Competition | Record | | | | | | | |
| Competition | Pld | W | D | L | GF | GA | GD | Win % |
|---|---|---|---|---|---|---|---|---|
| Ligue 1 | 19 | 8 | 6 | 5 | 25 | 19 | +6 | 42.11 |
| Coupe de France | 1 | 1 | 0 | 0 | 2 | 1 | +1 | 100.00 |
| Coupe de la Ligue | 3 | 0 | 2 | 1 | 5 | 6 | −1 | 0.00 |
| Total | 23 | 9 | 8 | 6 | 32 | 26 | +6 | 39.13 |

Last updated: 11 January 2017
Source: Competitions

=== Ligue 1 ===
==== League table ====
| Pos | Team | Pld | W | D | L | GF | GA | GD | Pts |
|---|---|---|---|---|---|---|---|---|---|
| 8 | Saint-Étienne | 38 | 12 | 14 | 12 | 41 | 42 | −1 | 50 |
| 9 | Rennes | 38 | 12 | 14 | 12 | 36 | 42 | −6 | 50 |
| 10 | Guingamp | 38 | 14 | 8 | 16 | 46 | 53 | −7 | 50 |
| 11 | Lille | 38 | 13 | 7 | 18 | 40 | 47 | −7 | 46 |
| 12 | Angers | 38 | 13 | 7 | 18 | 40 | 49 | −9 | 46 |

Source: Ligue 1, Soccerway
Rules for classification: 1) Points; 2) Goal difference; 3) Goals scored; 4) Head-to-head goal difference; 5) Fairplay ranking.

==== Results summary ====
| Overall | | | | | | | | Home | | | | | | Away | | | | | |
| Pld | W | D | L | GF | GA | GD | Pts | W | D | L | GF | GA | GD | W | D | L | GF | GA | GD |
|---|---|---|---|---|---|---|---|---|---|---|---|---|---|---|---|---|---|---|---|
| 38 | 14 | 8 | 16 | 46 | 53 | −7 | 50 | 12 | 3 | 4 | 28 | 13 | +15 | 2 | 5 | 12 | 18 | 40 | −22 |

Last updated: 20 May 2017.
Source: Competitive matches

==== Results by round ====
| Round | 1 | 2 | 3 | 4 | 5 | 6 | 7 | 8 | 9 | 10 | 11 | 12 | 13 | 14 | 15 | 16 | 17 | 18 | 19 | 20 | 21 | 22 | 23 | 24 | 25 | 26 | 27 | 28 | 29 | 30 | 31 | 32 | 33 | 34 | 35 | 36 | 37 | 38 |
|---|---|---|---|---|---|---|---|---|---|---|---|---|---|---|---|---|---|---|---|---|---|---|---|---|---|---|---|---|---|---|---|---|---|---|---|---|---|---|
| Ground | A | H | A | H | A | H | A | A | H | A | H | A | H | A | H | H | A | H | A | A | H | A | H | A | H | A | H | A | H | A | H | A | H | A | H | H | A | H |
| Result | D | W | W | D | L | W | L | L | W | W | W | D | D | D | L | W | L | W | D | L | D | L | L | L | W | L | L | D | W | L | W | L | W | L | L | W | L | W |
| Position | 10 | 5 | 1 | 5 | 7 | 6 | 8 | 10 | 5 | 5 | 4 | 4 | 5 | 5 | 7 | 5 | 6 | 5 | 5 | 5 | 5 | 8 | 8 | 9 | 8 | 9 | 10 | 11 | 8 | 10 | 8 | 10 | 8 | 10 | 10 | 9 | 10 | 10 |

Source: Ligue1
A = Away; H = Home; W = Win; D = Draw; L = Loss

==== Matches ====
Win Draw Loss

| 12 August 2016 Matchday 1 | Monaco | 2–2 | Guingamp | Monaco |
| 20:30 CEST (UTC+01:00) | Fabinho 71' (pen.); Bernardo Silva 84' | Report | 29' Diallo; 37' Privat | Stadium: Stade Louis II; Attendance: 8,019; Referee: Jérôme Miguelgorry |

| 21 August 2016 Matchday 2 | Guingamp | 2–1 | Marseille | Guingamp |
| 15:00 CEST (UTC+01:00) | Salibur 1'; Sorbon 58' | Report | 78' Thauvin | Stadium: Stade de Roudourou; Attendance: 16,056; Referee: Benoît Bastien |

| 27 August 2016 Matchday 3 | Nancy | 0–2 | Guingamp | Tomblaine |
| 20:00 CEST (UTC+01:00) | | Report | 59' Diallo; 79' Giresse | Stadium: Stade Marcel Picot; Attendance: 15,587; Referee: Frank Schneider |

| 10 September 2016 Matchday 4 | Guingamp | 1–1 | Montpellier | Guingamp |
| 20:00 CEST (UTC+01:00) | Coco 36' | Report | 11' M. Sanson | Stadium: Stade de Roudourou; Attendance: 12,630; Referee: Clément Turpin |

| 17 September 2016 Matchday 5 | Toulouse | 2–1 | Guingamp | Toulouse |
| 20:00 CEST (UTC+01:00) | Braithwaite 62' (pen.); Durmaz 66' | Report | 54' (pen.) Briand | Stadium: Stadium Municipal; Attendance: 12,109; Referee: Johan Hamel |

| 21 September 2016 Matchday 6 | Guingamp | 1–0 | Lorient | Guingamp |
| 19:00 CEST (UTC+01:00) | Briand 64' (pen.) | Report | | Stadium: Stade de Roudourou; Attendance: 13,175; Referee: Benoît Millot |

| 24 September 2016 Matchday 7 | Bastia | 1–0 | Guingamp | Furiani |
| 20:00 CEST (UTC+01:00) | Crivelli 76' | Report | | Stadium: Stade Armand Cesari; Referee: Amaury Delerue |

| 30 September 2016 Matchday 8 | Rennes | 1–0 | Guingamp | Rennes |
| 20:45 CEST (UTC+01:00) | Diakhaby 90+2' | Report | | Stadium: Roazhon Park; Attendance: 26,118; Referee: Nicolas Rainville |

| 15 October 2016 Matchday 9 | Guingamp | 1–0 | Lille | Guingamp |
| 20:00 CEST (UTC+01:00) | Privat 32' | Report | | Stadium: Stade de Roudourou; Attendance: 12,636; Referee: Sébastien Moreira |

| 22 October 2016 Matchday 10 | Lyon | 1–3 | Guingamp | Décines-Charpieu |
| 17:00 CEST (UTC+01:00) | Lacazette 37' (pen.) | Report | 46' Salibur; 52', 77' Coco | Stadium: Parc Olympique Lyonnais; Attendance: 39,184; Referee: Antony Gautier |

| 29 October 2016 Matchday 11 | Guingamp | 1–0 | Angers | Guingamp |
| 20:00 CEST (UTC+01:00) | De Pauw 78' | Report | | Stadium: Stade de Roudourou; Attendance: 15,277; Referee: Sébastien Desage |

| 5 November 2016 Matchday 12 | Dijon | 3–3 | Guingamp | Dijon |
| 20:00 CEST (UTC+01:00) | Varrault 6'; Diony 26'; Tavares 44' | Report | 32' Coco; 79' Mendy; 90+4' De Pauw | Stadium: Stade Gaston Gérard; Attendance: 7,954; Referee: Stéphane Lannoy |

| 20 November 2016 Matchday 13 | Guingamp | 1–1 | Bordeaux | Guingamp |
| 15:00 CEST (UTC+01:00) | Briand 90+3' | Report | 22' Lewczuk | Stadium: Stade de Roudourou; Attendance: 15,381; Referee: Tony Chapron |

| 26 November 2016 Matchday 14 | Caen | 1–1 | Guingamp | Caen |
| 20:00 CEST (UTC+01:00) | Rodelin 79' | Report | 85' De Pauw | Stadium: Stade Michel d'Ornano; Attendance: 14,902; Referee: Amaury Delerue |

| 30 November 2016 Matchday 15 | Guingamp | 0–1 | Nice | Guingamp |
| 19:00 CEST (UTC+01:00) | | Report | 5' Belhanda | Stadium: Stade de Roudourou; Attendance: 14,680; Referee: Benoît Millot |

| 3 December 2016 Matchday 16 | Guingamp | 2–0 | Nantes | Guingamp |
| 20:00 CEST (UTC+01:00) | Briand 22'; Salibur 64' | Report | | Stadium: Stade de Roudourou; Attendance: 12,643; Referee: Johan Hamel |

| 11 December 2016 Matchday 17 | Saint-Étienne | 1–0 | Guingamp | Saint-Étienne |
| 17:00 CEST (UTC+01:00) | Hamouma 25' | Report | | Stadium: Stade Geoffroy-Guichard; Attendance: 23,862; Referee: Stéphane Lannoy |

| 17 December 2016 Matchday 18 | Guingamp | 2–1 | Paris Saint-Germain | Guingamp |
| 17:00 CEST (UTC+01:00) | Salibur 66'; De Pauw 70' | Report | 80' Cavani | Stadium: Stade de Roudourou; Attendance: 18,033; Referee: Fredy Fautrel |

| 21 December 2016 Matchday 19 | Metz | 2–2 | Guingamp | Metz |
| 20:50 CEST (UTC+01:00) | Nguette 12'; Vion 90+2' | Report | 49' Briand; 74' Briand | Stadium: Stade Municipal Saint-Symphorien; Attendance: 14,091; Referee: Sébastien Desiage |

| 14 January 2017 Matchday 20 | Lorient | 3–1 | Guingamp | Lorient |
| 20:00 CEST (UTC+01:00) | Waris (yellow card) 58' (goal) 72' 90'; Mvuemba (yellow card) 79'; Cabot 82' | Summary | Briand (yellow card) 19'; Salibur 40'; Didot (yellow card) 48'; Deaux (yellow card) 86' | Stadium: Stade du Moustoir; Attendance: 12,463; Referee: (France) Sébastien Desiage |

| 21 January 2017 Matchday 21 | Guingamp | 1–1 | Rennes | Guingamp |
| 20:00 CEST (UTC+01:00) | Diallo (yellow card) 8' (goal) 39'; Fernando Marçal (yellow card) 58' | Report | Prcić (yellow card) 4' (yellow-red card); Kalulu (yellow card) 14'; Gourcuff 46'; Mexer (yellow card) 66' | Stadium: Stade de Roudourou; Attendance: 16,028; Referee: (France) Tony Chapron |

| 29 January 2017 Matchday 22 | Nice | 3–1 | Guingamp | Nice |
| 15:00 CEST (UTC+01:00) | Pléa 11'; Dalbert Henrique (yellow card) 14'; Koziello (yellow card) 23'; Seri 38'; Sarr (yellow card) 75'; Balotelli 87' | Report | Fernando Marçal (yellow card) 20'; Briand 63' (yellow card) 88'; Mendy (yellow card) 84' | Stadium: Allianz Riviera; Attendance: 20,063; Referee: (France) Jerome Miguelgorry |

| 4 February 2017 Matchday 23 | Guingamp | 0–1 | Caen | Guingamp |
| 20:00 CEST (UTC+01:00) | Diallo (yellow card) 38' | Report | Bessat (yellow card) 69'; Yahia (yellow card) 69'; Karamoh 90+3' | Stadium: Stade de Roudourou; Attendance: 14,428; Referee: (France) Johann Hamel |

| 8 February 2017 Matchday 24 | Marseille | 2–0 | Guingamp | Marseille |
| 21:00 CEST (UTC+01:00) | Gomis 26' (yellow card) 42'; Payet 76'; Rolando (yellow card) 77' | Report | Coco (yellow card) 38' | Stadium: Stade Vélodrome; Attendance: 28,560; Referee: (France) Benoît Millot |

| 11 February 2017 Matchday 25 | Guingamp | 2–1 | Lyon | Guingamp |
| 17:00 CEST (UTC+01:00) | Diallo 30'; Benezet 34'; Sankoh (yellow card) 35'; Martins Pereira (yellow card) 59' | Report | Lacazette 10'; Diakhaby (yellow card) 20'; Yanga-Mbiwa (yellow card) 27' | Stadium: Stade de Roudourou; Attendance: 15,242; Referee: (France) Frank Schneider |

| 19 February 2017 Matchday 26 | Bordeaux | 3–0 | Guingamp | Bordeaux |
| 15:00 CEST (UTC+01:00) | Kamano 13'; Vada (yellow card) 23'; Jovanović (yellow card) 26'; Pallois 43'; Laborde 71' | Report | Lévêque (yellow card) 19'; Martins Pereira (yellow card) 25' (yellow-red card); Bodmer (yellow card) 51' | Stadium: Nouveau Stade de Bordeaux; Attendance: 18,724; Referee: (France) Johann Hamel |

| 25 February 2017 Matchday 27 | Guingamp | 1–2 | Monaco | Guingamp |
| 17:00 CEST (UTC+01:00) | Ikolo (yellow card) 62'; Johnsson (yellow card) 86'; Didot 90' (yellow card) 90+3' | Report | Glik 24'; Fabinho (yellow card) 33' (goal) 86' (pen.); Sidibé (yellow card) 64' | Stadium: Stade de Roudourou; Attendance: 15,912; Referee: (France) Amaury Delerue |

| 4 March 2017 Matchday 28 | Montpellier | 1–1 | Guingamp | Montpellier |
| 20:00 CEST (UTC+01:00) | Mounié 50'; Syalla (yellow card) 86' | Report | Briand 85' | Stadium: Stade de la Mosson; Attendance: 9,182; Referee: (France) Jérôme Brisard |

| 11 March 2017 Matchday 29 | Guingamp | 5–0 | Bastia | Guingamp |
| 20:00 CEST (UTC+01:00) | Salibur 47'; Deaux 56'; Briand 70'; Blas 78'; Mendy 86' | Report | Nangis (yellow card) 14'; Oniangué (yellow card) 35'; Danic (yellow card) 39' (yellow-red card) | Stadium: Stade de Roudourou; Attendance: 14,419; Referee: (France) Antony Gautier |

| 18 March 2017 Matchday 30 | Angers | 3–0 | Guingamp | Angers |
| 20:00 CEST (UTC+01:00) | N'Doye (yellow card) 36'; Bamba (yellow card) 48'; Bamba 63'; Mangani 68'; Diédhiou 83' | Report | Didot (yellow card) 56' | Stadium: Stade Jean-Bouin; Attendance: 13,490; Referee: (France) Jérôme Brisard |

| 31 March 2017 Matchday 31 | Guingamp | 1–0 | Nancy | Guingamp |
| 19:00 CEST (UTC+01:00) | Privat 59'; Martins Pereira (yellow card) 77' | Report | Maouassa (yellow card) 16'; Diagne (red card) 27'; Muratori (yellow card) 69' | Stadium: Stade de Roudourou; Attendance: 14,279; Referee: (France) Jérôme Miguelgorry |

| 9 April 2017 Matchday 32 | Paris Saint-Germain | 4–0 | Guingamp | Paris |
| 21:00 CEST (UTC+01:00) | Di María 56'; Cavani 60' 70'; Matuidi 90+2'; Rabiot (yellow card) | Report | Coco (yellow card); Deaux (yellow card) | Stadium: Parc des Princes; Attendance: 45,944; Referee: (France) Ruddy Buquet |

| 15 April 2017 Matchday 33 | Guingamp | 2–1 | Toulouse | Guingamp |
| 20:00 CEST (UTC+01:00) | Sankoh (yellow card); Coco (yellow card); Briand 53' (pen.); Mendy 62'; Blas (yellow card) | Report | Doumbia (yellow card); Diop (yellow card); Delort 67' (pen.) | Stadium: Stade de Roudourou; Attendance: 15,871; Referee: (France) Antony Gautier |

| 22 April 2017 Matchday 34 | Lille | 3–0 | Guingamp | Villeneuve-d'Ascq |
| 20:00 CEST (UTC+01:00) | de Préville 9' 35' (pen.); Eder 66' | Report | Bodmer (yellow card) 16'; Kerbrat (yellow card) 35' | Stadium: Stade Pierre-Mauroy; Attendance: 28,848; Referee: (France) Clément Turpin |

| 29 April 2017 Matchday 35 | Guingamp | 0–2 | Saint-Étienne | Guingamp |
| 20:00 CEST (UTC+01:00) | | Report | Pajot 61'; Hamouma 86' (pen.) | Stadium: Stade de Roudourou; Attendance: 15.058; Referee: (France) Olivier Thual |

| 6 May 2017 Matchday 36 | Guingamp | 4–0 | Dijon | Guingamp |
| 20:00 CEST (UTC+01:00) | Briand 4' 64'; Salibur 55' 59' (pen.) | Report | | Stadium: Stade de Roudourou; Attendance: 13.055; Referee: (France) Tony Chapron |

| 14 May 2017 Matchday 37 | Nantes | 4–1 | Guingamp | Nantes |
| 21:00 CEST (UTC+01:00) | Thomasson 16'; Lucas Lima (yellow card) 28'; Sala (yellow card) 34' (goal) 51' 78'; Nakoulma 69' | Report | Deaux (yellow card) 5' (goal) 74'; Mendy (yellow card) 26'; Didot (yellow card) 35'; Blas (yellow card) 90' | Stadium: Stade de la Beaujoire; Attendance: 20,417; Referee: (France) Karim Abed |

| 20 May 2017 Matchday 38 | Guingamp | 1–0 | Metz | Guingamp |
| 21:00 CEST (UTC+01:00) | Diallo 29' | Report | Philipps (yellow card); Falette (yellow card) | Stadium: Stade de Roudourou; Attendance: 16,200; Referee: (France) Ruddy Buquet |

=== Coupe de France ===
| 7 January 2017 Round of 64 | Guingamp | 2–1 | Le Havre (2) | Guingamp |
| 18:00 CEST (UTC+01:00) | Diallo 42'; Briand 60' | | 90+1' Dembélé | Stadium: Stade de Roudourou; Attendance: 10,599; Referee: Mikaël Lesage |

| 1 February 2017 Round of 32 | Les Herbiers (3) | 1–2 (a.e.t.) | Guingamp | Les Herbiers |
| 18:00 | Kalifa Traoré (yellow card) 52' (yellow-red card); Glombard 90+1' | Report | Fernando Marçal (yellow card) 42'; Mendy 72'; Briand (yellow card) 90+2'; Bodmer 114'; Giresse (yellow card) 116' | Stadium: Stade Massabielle; Attendance: 4,600; Referee: (France) Olivier Thual |

| 1 March 2017 Round of 16 | US Quevilly-Rouen | 1–2 | Guingamp | Le Petit-Quevilly |
| 18:30 | Pierre Vignaud (yellow card) 79' (goal) 90+2' | Report | Deaux (yellow card) 36'; Mendy 59'; De Pauw 61' | Stadium: Stade Robert Diochon; Attendance: 7,536; Referee: (France) Nicolas Rainville |

| 4 April 2017 Quarter-finals | Étoile Fréjus Saint-Raphaël | 0–1 | Guingamp | Cannes |
| 18:00 | | Report | Diallo (yellow card) 22'; Mendy 50'; Ikolo (yellow card) 79'; Bodmer (yellow card) 83' | Stadium: Stade Pierre de Coubertin; Attendance: 4,831; Referee: (France) Benoît Millot |

| 25 April 2017 Semi-finals | Angers | 2–0 | Guingamp | Angers |
| 21:00 | Mangani 38' (yellow card) 90'; Bamba (yellow card) 50'; Toko Ekambi 90+2' | Report | Kerbrat (yellow card) 19'; Diallo (yellow card) 60'; Didot (yellow card) 75' | Stadium: Stade Raymond Kopa; Attendance: 15,540; Referee: (France) Benoît Millot |

=== Coupe de la Ligue ===
| 26 October 2016 Round of 32 | Bastia (1) | 1–1 (3–4 p) | Guingamp | Furiani |
| 21:05 CEST (UTC+01:00) | Marange 45+2' | Report | 28' Privat | Stadium: Stade Armand Cesari; Attendance: 6,029; Referee: Mikaël Lesage |
| | Penalties |
| | Diallo (penalty scored); Danic (penalty scored); Bifouma (penalty missed); Bengtsson (penalty missed); Saint-Maximin (penalty scored) | | (penalty scored) De Pauw; (penalty scored) Sankoh; (penalty missed) Livolant; (penalty scored) Mané; (penalty scored) Blas |

| 14 December 2016 Round of 16 | Lyon (1) | 2–2 (3–4 p) | Guingamp | Décines-Charpieu |
| 21:05 CEST (UTC+01:00) | Valbuena 43'; Lacazette 75' | Report | 20' Blas; 70' De Pauw | Stadium: Parc OL; Attendance: 17,002; Referee: Benoît Bastien |
| | Penalties |
| | Fékir (penalty missed); Mammana (penalty scored); Jallet (penalty scored); Valbuena (penalty missed); Lacazette (penalty scored) | | (penalty scored) Giresse; (penalty missed) De Pauw; (penalty scored) Angoua; (penalty scored) Diabaté; (penalty scored) Kerbrat |

| 11 January 2017 Quarter-finals | Bordeaux (1) | 3–2 | Guingamp | Bordeaux |
| 18:45 CEST (UTC+01:00) | Kamano 16'; Laborde 36' 64' | Report | 12' Privat; 88' Benezet | Stadium: Matmut Atlantique; Attendance: 8,900; Referee: Ruddy Buquet |
