= 2015–16 En Avant de Guingamp season =

Guingamp
2015–16 season
- Chairman: Bertrand Desplat
- Manager: Jocelyn Gourvennec
- Stadium: Stade du Roudourou
- Ligue 1: 16th
- Coupe de France: Round of 32
- Coupe de la Ligue: Quarter-final
- Top goalscorer: League: Sloan Privat (8); All: Sloan Privat (10)
- Highest home attendance: 18,022 vs Marseille (28 August 2015)
- Lowest home attendance: 10,873 vs Nice (15 December 2015)
Home colours	Away colours	Third colours

The 2015–16 En Avant de Guingamp season is the 104th professional season of the club since its creation in 1912.

== Players ==
French teams are limited to four players without EU citizenship. Hence, the squad list includes only the principal nationality of each player; several non-European players on the squad have dual citizenship with an EU country. Also, players from the ACP countries—countries in Africa, the Caribbean, and the Pacific that are signatories to the Cotonou Agreement—are not counted against non-EU quotas due to the Kolpak ruling.

=== Current squad ===
As of 8 January 2016.

Note: Flags indicate national team as defined under FIFA eligibility rules; some limited exceptions apply. Players may hold more than one non-FIFA nationality.

No.	Pos.	Nation	Player
1	GK	DEN	Jonas Lössl
2	DF	DEN	Lars Jacobsen
3	DF	CIV	Benjamin Angoua
5	MF	SEN	Mustapha Diallo
6	DF	FRA	Maxime Baca
7	DF	FRA	Dorian Lévêque
8	MF	FRA	Julien Cardy
9	FW	MLI	Mana Dembélé
10	MF	FRA	Nicolas Benezet
11	FW	GUF	Sloan Privat (on loan from Gent)
12	MF	BEL	Nill De Pauw
13	MF	SEN	Younousse Sankharé
15	DF	FRA	Jérémy Sorbon
16	GK	FRA	Théo Guivarch

No.	Pos.	Nation	Player
18	MF	FRA	Lionel Mathis (captain)
19	MF	FRA	Yannis Salibur
20	MF	FRA	Laurent Dos Santos
21	MF	FRA	Ludovic Blas
22	DF	FRA	Jonathan Martins Pereira
23	FW	FRA	Jimmy Briand
24	MF	FRA	Marcus Coco
25	DF	FRA	Reynald Lemaître
26	MF	FRA	Thibault Giresse
27	DF	FRA	Franck Héry
28	FW	TUR	Mevlüt Erdinç (on loan from Hannover 96)
29	DF	FRA	Christophe Kerbrat
30	GK	MLI	Mamadou Samassa
33	DF	FRA	Jérémy Livolant

=== Out on loan ===
Note: Flags indicate national team as defined under FIFA eligibility rules; some limited exceptions apply. Players may hold more than one non-FIFA nationality.

No.	Pos.	Nation	Player
—	DF	GUI	Baissama Sankoh (on loan to Brest)
—	FW	MAR	Rachid Alioui (on loan to Laval)
—	FW	DEN	Ronnie Schwartz (on loan to Brøndby)

== Transfers ==
=== Transfers in ===
Date	Pos.	Player	Age	Moved from	Fee	Notes
1 July 2015	MF	(Belgium) Nill De Pauw	25	(Belgium) Lokeren	Undisclosed	
1 July 2015	GK	(France) Théo Guivarch	19	(France) Lorient B	Free Transfer	
3 July 2015	MF	(France) Nicolas Benezet	24	(France) Evian	Undisclosed	
3 August 2015	FW	(France) Jimmy Briand	30	(Germany) Hannover 96	Free Transfer	

=== Loans in ===
Date	Pos.	Player	Age	Loaned from	Return date	Notes
1 July 2015	FW	(French Guiana) Sloan Privat	25	(Belgium) Gent	30 June 2016	
7 January 2016	FW	(Turkey) Mevlüt Erdinç	28	(Germany) Hannover 96	30 June 2016	

=== Transfers out ===
Date	Pos.	Player	Age	Moved to	Fee	Notes
1 July 2015	FW	(France) Claudio Beauvue	27	(France) Lyon	£3,500,000	
1 July 2015	FW	(Republic of the Congo) Ladislas Douniama	29	Unattached	Released	
1 July 2015	GK	(France) Hugo Guichard	23	Unattached	Released	
15 July 2015	FW	(France) Christophe Mandanne	30	(United Arab Emirates) Al-Fujairah	Free Transfer	

=== Loans out ===
Date	Pos.	Player	Age	Loaned to	Return date	Notes
1 July 2015	FW	(Morocco) Rachid Alioui	23	(France) Laval	30 June 2016	
19 July 2015	DF	(Guinea) Baissama Sankoh	23	(France) Brest	30 June 2016	
27 July 2015	FW	(Denmark) Ronnie Schwartz	25	(Denmark) Brøndby	30 June 2016	
28 December 2015	FW	(France) Julien Bègue	21	(France) FBBP01	30 June 2016	

== Pre-season & friendlies ==
11 July 2015 Friendly	Guingamp (France)	2–0	(France) Avranches
18:00 CEST (UTC+02:00)	Salibur 24' (pen.); Achahbar 48'	Report

17 July 2015 Friendly	Bordeaux (France)	1–1	(France) Guingamp
18:00 CEST (UTC+02:00)	Maulun 20'	Report	Bègue 64'

25 July 2015 Friendly	Guingamp (France)	2–2	(France) Stade Brest
17:35 CEST (UTC+02:00)	Dembélé 75', 76'	Report	Grougi 34'; Cuvillier 68'

1 August 2015 Friendly	Reims (France)	2–0	(France) Guingamp	Reims
18:00 CEST (UTC+02:00)	Ngog 76'; Siebatcheu 87'	Report		Stadium: Stade Auguste Delaune

== Competitions ==
=== Ligue 1 ===
==== League table ====
Pos	Team	Pld	W	D	L	GF	GA	GD	Pts	Qualification or relegation
14	Nantes	38	12	12	14	33	44	−11	48	
15	Lorient	38	11	13	14	47	58	−11	46	
16	Guingamp	38	11	11	16	47	56	−9	44	
17	Toulouse	38	9	13	16	45	55	−10	40	
18	Reims (R)	38	10	9	19	44	57	−13	39	Relegation to Ligue 2 (Note: Starting this season, Ligue 1 decided to reduce the number of relegation spots from three to two. However, the decision was appealed and overturned so three teams were relegated.)

Source: Ligue 1, Soccerway
Rules for classification: 1) Points; 2) Goal difference; 3) Goals scored; 4) Head-to-head points; 5) Head-to-head goal difference; 6) Fairplay ranking.
(R) Relegated

==== Results summary ====
Overall								Home						Away					
Pld	W	D	L	GF	GA	GD	Pts	W	D	L	GF	GA	GD	W	D	L	GF	GA	GD
38	11	11	16	47	56	−9	44	6	7	6	31	28	+3	5	4	10	16	28	−12

Last updated: 14 May 2016.
Source: Competitive matches

==== Results by round ====
Round	1	2	3	4	5	6	7	8	9	10	11	12	13	14	15	16	17	18	19	20	21	22	23	24	25	26	27	28	29	30	31	32	33	34	35	36	37	38
Ground	A	H	A	H	A	H	A	H	A	H	A	H	A	H	A	H	A	A	H	A	H	H	A	H	A	H	A	H	A	H	A	H	H	A	H	A	A	H
Result	L	L	L	W	W	W	L	D	W	D	D	D	L	W	L	L	L	L	L	D	D	W	W	W	D	L	L	D	L	W	W	D	L	W	D	L	D	L
Position	18	18	20	16	14	8	12	13	11	11	12	11	12	10	12	14	17	18	18	19	18	16	14	13	13	15	16	16	17	16	15	15	15	14	12	15	15	16

Source: Ligue1
A = Away; H = Home; W = Win; D = Draw; L = Loss

==== Matches ====
Win Draw Loss

8 August 2015 1	Nantes	1–0	Guingamp	Nantes
21:00 CEST (UTC+02:00)	Djidji (yellow card) 27'; B. Touré (yellow card) 61'; Sorbon 89' (o.g.)	Report	Lévêque (yellow card) 37'; Diallo (yellow card) 41'; Sankharé (yellow card) 66'	Stadium: Stade de la Beaujoire; Attendance: 27,248; Referee: Benoît Bastien

15 August 2015 2	Guingamp	0–1	Lyon	Guingamp
20:00 CEST (UTC+02:00)	Diallo (yellow card) 29'; De Pauw (yellow card) 37'	Report	Rafael (yellow card) 68'; Umtiti (yellow card) 70'; Beauvue 79'	Stadium: Stade du Roudourou; Attendance: 17,728; Referee: Antony Gautier

22 August 2015 3	Bastia	3–0	Guingamp	Furiani
20:00 CEST (UTC+02:00)	Palmieri 5'; Baca 39' (o.g.); Ayité (yellow card) 53'; Djiku (yellow card) 69'; Coulibaly 90'	Report	Dembélé (yellow card) 51'; Sorbon (yellow card) 61'; De Pauw (yellow card) 83'	Stadium: Stade Armand Cesari; Attendance: 13,966; Referee: Fredy Fautrel

28 August 2015 4	Guingamp	2–0	Marseille	Guingamp
20:30 CEST (UTC+02:00)	Lemaître (yellow card) 16'; Privat 72'; Benezet 89'	Report	Diarra (yellow card) 2'; Mendy (yellow card) 15'; Alessandrini (yellow card) 61'; Nkoulou (yellow card) 63'; Batshuayi (yellow card) 74'; Sparagna (yellow card) 83'	Stadium: Stade du Roudourou; Attendance: 18,022; Referee: Amaury Delerue

12 September 2015 5	Nice	0–1	Guingamp	Nice
20:00 CEST (UTC+02:00)	Koziello (yellow card) 66'	Report	Coco (yellow card) 40'; Benezet (yellow card) 74'; Sankharé 76'; Mathis (yellow card) 87'	Stadium: Allianz Riviera; Attendance: 14,421; Referee: Tony Chapron

19 September 2015 6	Guingamp	2–1	Gazélec Ajaccio	Guingamp
20:00 CEST (UTC+02:00)	Privat 23'; Briand 61'; Angoua (yellow card) 74'; Mathis (yellow card) 80'	Report	Sylla (yellow card) 27' (yellow-red card) 39'; Mangane 35'; Lemoigne (yellow card) 37'; Coeff (yellow card) 59'; Martinez (yellow card) 63'; Đoković (yellow card) 74'	Stadium: Stade du Roudourou; Attendance: 13,490; Referee: Nicolas Rainville

22 September 2015 7	Paris Saint-Germain	3–0	Guingamp	Paris
21:00 CEST (UTC+02:00)	Pastore 18'; Matuidi (yellow card) 59'; Di María 77'; Ibrahimović 83'	Report	Sankharé (yellow card) 86'	Stadium: Parc des Princes; Attendance: 45,138; Referee: Frank Schneider

27 September 2015 8	Guingamp	3–3	Monaco	Guingamp
17:00 CEST (UTC+02:00)	Jacobsen (yellow card) 24'; Privat 30'; Benezet 65', 89'; Mathis (yellow card) 70'; Sankharé (yellow card) 84'; Bègue (yellow card) 86'; Salibur (yellow card) 90+3'	Report	Silva 14'; Carvalho (yellow card) 32'; Raggi 45', (yellow card) 90+3'; Bakayoko (yellow card) 60'; Dirar 71'	Stadium: Stade du Roudourou; Attendance: 13,987; Referee: Wilfried Bien

3 October 2015 9	Troyes	0–1	Guingamp	Troyes
20:00 CEST (UTC+02:00)	Ayasse (yellow card) 56' (yellow-red card) 85'; Perea (yellow card) 80'	Report	Coco (yellow card) 62'; Héry (yellow card) 72'; Sankharé 81'	Stadium: Stade de l'Aube; Attendance: 14,225; Referee: Jérôme Miguelgorry

17 October 2015 10	Guingamp	1–1	Lille	Guingamp
20:00 CEST (UTC+02:00)	Diallo (yellow card) 4'; Briand 33'	Report	Sunzu (yellow card) 11' (yellow-red card) 89'; Boufal 30', (yellow card) 65'; Soumaoro (yellow card) 44'; Guillaume (yellow card) 66'	Stadium: Stade du Roudourou; Attendance: 13,084; Referee: Hakim Ben El Hadj

24 October 2015 11	Angers	0–0	Guingamp	Angers
20:00 CEST (UTC+02:00)	Thomas (yellow card) 42'; Sissoko (red card) 81'; Mangani (yellow card) 83'	Report	Diallo (yellow card) 38'; Angoua (yellow card) 58'	Stadium: Stade Jean-Bouin; Attendance: 14,419; Referee: Antony Gautier

31 October 2015 12	Guingamp	2–2	Lorient	Guingamp
20:00 CET (UTC+01:00)	Briand 1'; Sankharé (yellow card) 24' (yellow-red card) 45'; Benezet (yellow card) 40'; Mathis (yellow card) 65'; Salibur 83'	Report	Waris (red card) 43'; Moukandjo 64' (pen.), 90+3'; Mesloub (yellow card) 64'	Stadium: Stade du Roudourou; Attendance: 14,085; Referee: Nicolas Rainville

7 November 2015 13	Caen	2–1	Guingamp	Caen
20:00 CET (UTC+01:00)	Féret 62'; Delort (yellow card) 67'; Delort 71'	Report	Jacobsen (yellow card) 51'; Lévêque 85'	Stadium: Stade Michel d'Ornano; Attendance: 16,111; Referee: Jérôme Miguelgorry

21 November 2015 14	Guingamp	2–0	Toulouse	Guingamp
20:00 CET (UTC+01:00)	Diallo (yellow card) 27'; Privat (yellow card) 32', (goal) 59'; Salibur 70'; Lévêque (yellow card) 73'	Report	Machach (yellow card) 24'; Matheus (yellow card) 38'; Bodiger (yellow card) 41'; Kana-Biyik (red card) 83'	Stadium: Stade du Roudourou; Attendance: 12,737; Referee: Wilfried Bien

29 November 2015 15	Saint-Étienne	3–0	Guingamp	Saint Étienne
14:00 CET (UTC+01:00)	Eysseric (yellow card) 26', (goal) 87' (pen.); Sall (yellow card) 43' (yellow-red card) 90'; Hamouma 52'; Ruffier (yellow card) 69'; Roux 90+5'	Report	Dembélé (yellow card) 38'; Salibur (yellow card) 45+2'; Sankharé (yellow card) 52'	Stadium: Stade Geoffroy-Guichard; Attendance: 25,249; Referee: Ruddy Buquet

2 December 2015 16	Guingamp	1–2	Reims	Guingamp
19:00 CET (UTC+01:00)	Salibur 45+3', (yellow card) 42' (yellow-red card) 51'; Sorbon (yellow card) 76'; Coco (yellow card) 84'	Report	Ngog 14', 54', (yellow card) 40'; Traore (yellow card) 16' (yellow-red card) 90'; Weber (yellow card) 40'; Peuget (yellow card) 45+2'; Fofana (yellow card) 53'	Stadium: Stade du Roudourou; Attendance: 14,046; Referee: Johan Hamel

6 December 2015 17	Bordeaux	1–0	Guingamp	Bordeaux
17:00 CET (UTC+01:00)	Yambéré 62'; Khazri (yellow card) 90+4'	Report	Dos Santos (yellow card) 61'; Privat (yellow card) 87'	Stadium: Nouveau Stade de Bordeaux; Attendance: 22,606; Referee: Clément Turpin

12 December 2015 18	Montpellier	2–1	Guingamp	Montpellier
20:00 CET (UTC+01:00)	Camara 54'; Ninga 62'; Hilton (yellow card) 90+2'; Roussillon (yellow card) 90+3'	Report	Benezet (yellow card) 28' (yellow-red card) 34'; Privat 32'; Cardy (yellow card) 58'; Coco (yellow card) 90+3'	Stadium: Stade de la Mosson; Attendance: 10,846; Referee: Sébastien Moreira

19 December 2015 19	Guingamp	0–2	Rennes	Guingamp
20:00 CET (UTC+01:00)	Diallo (yellow card) 45+1'	Report	Pedro Henrique (yellow card) 62'; Dembélé 63'; Sio 77'; Fernandes (yellow card) 81'	Stadium: Stade du Roudourou; Attendance: 16,196; Referee: Benoît Millot

10 January 2016 20	Marseille	0–0	Guingamp	Marseille
21:00 CET (UTC+01:00)	Rolando (yellow card) 59'; Batshuayi (yellow card) 61'	Report	Martins Pereira (yellow card) 80'	Stadium: Stade Vélodrome; Attendance: 38,948; Referee: Fredy Fautrel

16 January 2016 21	Guingamp	2–2	Nantes	Guingamp
20:00 CET (UTC+01:00)	Benezet 3'; Salibur (yellow card) 14', (goal) 23'; Lemaître (yellow card) 63'; Diallo (yellow card) 74'; Martins Pereira (yellow card) 87'; Sankharé (red card) 90+4'	Report	Kerbrat 64' (o.g.); Sabaly 90+2'; Sigþórsson (yellow card) 90+3'	Stadium: Stade du Roudourou; Attendance: 13,762; Referee: Antony Gautier

23 January 2016 22	Guingamp	1–0	Bastia	Guingamp
20:00 CET (UTC+01:00)	Kerbrat (yellow card) 26'; Giresse 90+4' (pen.)	Report	Danic (yellow card) 25'; Ayite (red card) 68'; Palmieri (yellow card) 90+2'; Cahuzac (red card) 90+2'	Stadium: Stade du Roudourou; Attendance: 14,065; Referee: Mikael Lesage

30 January 2016 23	Toulouse	1–2	Guingamp	Toulouse
20:00 CET (UTC+01:00)	Akpa Akpro (yellow card) 37'; Ben Yedder 64' (pen.); Diop (yellow card) 47' (yellow-red card) 90+2'	Report	Younousse Sankharé 12', (yellow card) 88'; Giresse (yellow card) 29'; Briand 72'; Kerbrat (yellow card) 79'; Mathis (yellow card) 90'	Stadium: Stade Municipal; Attendance: 20,097; Referee: Sébastien Moreira

3 February 2016 24	Guingamp	4–0	Troyes	Guingamp
19:00 CET (UTC+01:00)	Erdinç 5'; Kerbrat (yellow card) 30'; Sankharé 46'; Giresse 56'; Blas 90'	Report	Dabo (yellow card) 18'; Traoré (yellow card) 28'; Thiago Xavier (yellow card) 32'	Stadium: Stade du Roudourou; Attendance: 13,973; Referee: Jérôme Miguelgorry

6 February 2016 25	Gazélec Ajaccio	0–0	Guingamp	Ajaccio, Corsica
20:00 CET (UTC+01:00)	Touré (yellow card) 18'	Report	Mathis (red card) 8'	Stadium: Stade Ange Casanova; Attendance: 3,569; Referee: Clément Turpin

13 February 2016 26	Guingamp	2–4	Bordeaux	Guingamp
20:00 CET (UTC+01:00)	Giresse 42'; Coco 58'; Privat (yellow card) 90+3'	Report	Ounas 19'; Rolán 37'; Chantôme 68'; Diabaté 89'	Stadium: Stade du Roudourou; Attendance: 13,177; Referee: Hakim Ben El Hadj

20 February 2016 27	Lorient	4–3	Guingamp	Lorient
20:00 CET (UTC+01:00)	Waris 38', 49'; Ndong 39'; Jeannot 48', (yellow card) 89'; Rose (yellow card) 81'; Le Goff (yellow card) 88'; Guerreiro 90+2'	Report	Salibur 3', 37'; Briand 59'; Sankharé (yellow card) 90+1'	Stadium: Stade du Moustoir; Attendance: 12,229; Referee: Bartolomeu Varela

27 February 2016 28	Guingamp	2–2	Angers	Guingamp
20:00 CET (UTC+01:00)	Sankharé (yellow card) 38'; Privat 39'; Giresse 66' (pen.) (yellow card) 68'; Martins Pereira (yellow card) 78'	Report	Capelle 30'; Saïss (yellow card) 37'; Ndoye (red card) 42'; Traoré (yellow card) 65'; Ketkeophomphone 79' (pen.), (yellow card) 86'	Stadium: Stade du Roudourou; Attendance: 13,506; Referee: Benoît Millot

6 March 2016 29	Lyon	5–1	Guingamp	Lyon
21:00 CET (UTC+1)	Ghezzal 3'; Lacazette (yellow card) 13', (goal) 17', 61'; Cornet 35'; Grenier (yellow card) 82'; Lemaitre 86' (o.g.)	Report	Erdinç 11'; Mathis (yellow card) 13'; Angoua (yellow card) 14'; Diallo (yellow card) 60'	Stadium: Parc Olympique Lyonnais; Attendance: 33,133; Referee: Fredy Fautrel

12 March 2016 30	Guingamp	2–0	Saint-Étienne	Guingamp
20:00 CET (UTC+1)	Briand 7'; Privat 24'	Report	Maupay (yellow card) 18'; Sall (yellow card) 45+1'	Stadium: Stade du Roudourou; Referee: Stéphane Jochem

19 March 2016 31	Reims	0–1	Guingamp	Reims
20:00 CET (UTC+1)	Conte (yellow card) 28'; Kankava (yellow card) 41'; Traoré (yellow card) 44'; Mandi (yellow card) 75'	Report	Sankharé 26'; Jacobsen (yellow card) 40'; Coc (yellow card) 56'	Stadium: Stade Auguste Delaune; Attendance: 14,433; Referee: Frank Schneider

2 April 2016 32	Guingamp	2–2	Montpellier	Guingamp
20:00 CET (UTC+1)	Salibur 5'; Diallo (yellow card) 28'; Sorbon 47'; Kerbrat (yellow card) 84'	Report	Deplagne (yellow card) 9'; Skhiri (yellow card) 30'; Sanson 34', 53'	Stadium: Stade du Roudourou; Attendance: 13,640; Referee: Ruddy Buquet

9 April 2016 33	Guingamp	0–2	Paris Saint-Germain	Guingamp
17:00 CEST (UTC+01:00)	Kerbrat (yellow card) 27'; Briand (yellow card) 56'	Report	Lucas 56' (pen.), 72'	Stadium: Stade du Roudourou; Attendance: 18,363; Referee: Fredy Fautrel

17 April 2016 34	Rennes	0–3	Guingamp	Rennes
17:00 CET (UTC+01:00)	Mexer (yellow card) 5'; Sio (yellow card) 89'; Diagné (yellow card) 90'	Report	Diallo (yellow card) 18', (goal) 63'; Kerbrat (yellow card) 56'; Briand 73'; Sankharé 77'	Stadium: Roazhon Park; Attendance: 29,068; Referee: Mikael Lesage

24 April 2016 35	Guingamp	1–1	Caen	Guingamp
17:00 CEST (UTC+02:00)	Diallo (yellow card) 41'; Giresse (red card) 79'; Sorbon 82'	Report	Rodelin 30'; Seube (yellow card) 62' (yellow-red card) 90+2'	Stadium: Stade du Roudourou; Attendance: 16,203; Referee: Benoît Millot

30 April 2016 36	Monaco	3–2	Guingamp	Monaco
19:00 CEST (UTC+02:00)	Traoré 17'; Dirar 40'; Silva 76'; Carvalho (yellow card) 89'; Subašić (yellow card) 90+2'	Report	Erdinç 75'; Angoua 81', (yellow card) 84'	Stadium: Stade Louis II; Attendance: 6,669; Referee: Clément Turpin

7 May 2016 37	Lille	0–0	Guingamp	Villeneuve-d'Ascq
20:00 CEST (UTC+2)	Amadou (yellow card) 45'	Report	Sankharé (yellow card) 26'; Briand (yellow card) 42'; Coco (yellow card) 79'; Blas (yellow card) 90+3'	Stadium: Stade Pierre-Mauroy; Attendance: 30,298; Referee: Amaury Delerue

14 May 2016 38	Guingamp	v	Nice	Guingamp
21:00 CEST (UTC+02:00)				Stadium: Stade du Roudourou

=== Coupe de la Ligue ===
25 November 2015 Round of 32	Gazélec Ajaccio	0–1 (a.e.t.)	Guingamp	Ajaccio, Corsica
18:30 CET (UTC+01:00)		Report	Sorbon (yellow card) 56'; Kerbrat (yellow card) 97'; Privat 104'	Stadium: Stade Ange Casanova; Attendance: 1,570; Referee: Mikael Lesage

15 December 2015 Round of 16	Guingamp	2–2 (a.e.t.) (4–3 p)	Nice	Guingamp
20:00 CET (UTC+01:00)	Angoua (yellow card) 54'; Lemaître (yellow card) 62'; Salibur 89', 110'; Dembélé (yellow card) 93'	Report	Mallmann (yellow card) 24'; Mendy 44', 93'; Le Marchand (yellow card) 49'; Baysse (yellow card) 72'; Boscagli (yellow card) 98'; Hult (yellow card) 109'	Stadium: Stade du Roudourou; Attendance: 10,873; Referee: Fredy Fautrel
	Penalties
	De Pauw (penalty scored); Angoua (penalty scored); Sankharé (penalty missed); Dembélé (penalty scored); Lössl (penalty missed); Salibur (penalty scored)		Germain (penalty scored); Ben Arfa (penalty scored); Pied (penalty missed); Seri (penalty scored); Boscagli (penalty missed); Le Marchand (penalty missed)

13 January 2016 Quarter-final	Guingamp	0–0 (a.e.t.) (2–4 p)	Lille	Guingamp
20:00 CET (UTC+01:00)	Lévêque (yellow card) 65'; Coco (yellow card) 82'; Salibur (yellow card) 72'	Report	Sunzu (yellow card) 75'; Bauthéac (yellow card) 82'; Tallo (yellow card) 84'; Balmont (yellow card) 90+3'	Stadium: Stade du Roudourou; Attendance: 11,326; Referee: Tony Chapron
	Penalties
	Giresse (penalty scored); Benezet (penalty missed); Erdinç (penalty scored); Lévêque (penalty missed)		(penalty scored) Boufal; (penalty scored) Sidibé; (penalty scored) Tallo; (penalty missed) Mavuba; (penalty scored) Bauthéac

=== Coupe de France ===
3 January 2016 Round of 64	US Chantilly	0–4	Guingamp	Senlis
15:00 CET (UTC+01:00)	Suédois (yellow card) 27'	Report	Privat 48'; Giresse 64'; Salibur 71'; Briand 74'	Stadium: Complexe Sportif; Attendance: 1,850; Referee: Hamid Guenaoui

19 January 2016 Round of 32	Gazélec Ajaccio	3–0	Guingamp	Ajaccio, Corsica
18:00 CET (UTC+01:00)	Boutaïb 5', 21', 49', (yellow card) 85'	Report	Coco (yellow card) 10'; Mathis (yellow card) 45'	Stadium: Stade Ange Casanova; Attendance: 2,000; Referee: Ruddy Buquet
