= 2014 Coupe de France final =

Final of the 2013–14 edition of the Coupe de France

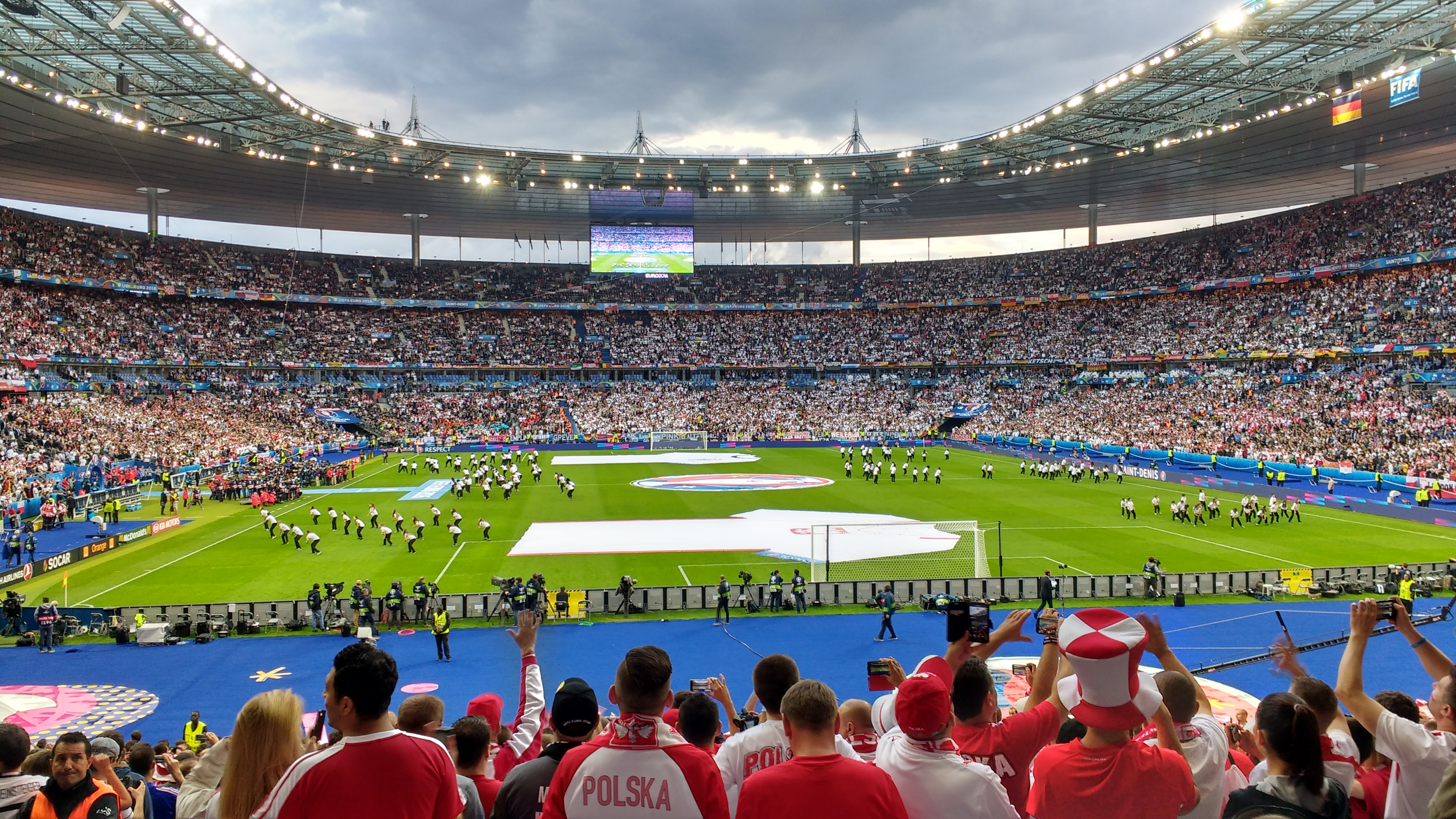
- Stade de France
- Event: 2013–14 Coupe de France
Rennes	Guingamp
Ligue 1	Ligue 1
0	2
- Date: 3 May 2014
- Venue: Stade de France, Saint-Denis
- Referee: Tony Chapron
- Attendance: 80,000

The 2014 Coupe de France final decided the winner of the 2013–14 Coupe de France, the 97th season of France's premier football cup. It was played on 3 May at the Stade de France in Saint-Denis, Paris.

In the final, Guingamp beat Rennes 2–0 in a Derby Breton to win their second Coupe de France title. By winning, they qualified for the Group Stage of the 2014–15 UEFA Europa League, and the 2014 Trophée des Champions against the 2013–14 Ligue 1 champions Paris Saint-Germain.

== Background ==
The match was Rennes' sixth final, of which they had won two (1965 and 1971). Their most recent final was in 2009, which they lost 2–1 to Guingamp. That was Guingamp's second appearance in the final after their unsuccessful attempt in 1997 when they lost on penalties to Nice.

Hundreds of supporters of Guingamp (based in a small agricultural town in northern Brittany, the team is nicknamed 'The Farmers') travelled to Paris in a motorcade of tractors.

== Route to the final ==
Rennes			Round	Guingamp
Opponent	H/A	Result	2013–14 Coupe de France	Opponent	H/A	Result
Valenciennes	H	1–1 (a.e.t.) (8–7 pen.)	Round of 64	FC Bourg-Péronnas	A	2–0
Boulogne	A	2–0	Round of 32	Concarneau	A	3–2 (a.e.t.)
Auxerre	A	1–0	Round of 16	Île-Rousse	A	2–0
Lille	H	2–0	Quarter-finals	Cannes	A	2–0
Angers	A	3–2	Semi-finals	Monaco	A	3–1 (a.e.t.)

=== Rennes ===
Rennes, of Ligue 1, began their campaign in the Round of 64 on 4 January at home to fellow top-flight team Valenciennes, winning 8–7 on penalties. In the next round, they won 2–0 at third-tier Boulogne, with goals from Anders Konradsen and Silvio Romero. In the Round of 16, away to Ligue 2 Auxerre, they won via a first-half Foued Kadir goal. Rennes then beat Lille 2–0 at home, with goals from Kamil Grosicki and Romain Alessandrini. In their semi-final on 15 April, Rennes beat second-tier Angers 3–2 at home, with Ola Toivonen, Grosicki and Jean Makoun scoring.

=== Guingamp ===
Guingamp, also of Ligue 1, entered into the Round of 64, where they played away to third-tier Bourg-Péronnas on 5 January and won via first-half goals from Claudio Beauvue and Mustapha Yatabaré. They went away again in the Round of 32, to fifth-tier Concarneau, and won 3–2 in extra-time after a 1-1 regulation-time draw, Yatabaré (2) and Beauvue again the scorers. In the Round of 16 Guingamp travelled to Corsica to play another fifth-tier club, Île-Rousse, who had reached that stage by defeating holders Bordeaux. Goals from Grégory Cerdan and Mustapha Diallo sent Guingamp into the quarter-finals, where they played AS Cannes and won 2–0 away again, through another Yatabaré brace. In the semi-final on 16 April 2014, Guingamp played at home against their first top-flight opponents, Monaco. Yatabaré scored early on, but Dimitar Berbatov equalised before half-time. The scores remained level into the second half of extra time, in which Guingamp scored twice, through Yatabaré and Fatih Atık.

== Match ==
=== Summary ===
Jonathan Martins Pereira scored the first goal for Guingamp with a volley from the edge of the area in the 37th minute, and Mustapha Yatabaré got the second in the 46th minute with a powerful downward header from Steeven Langil's left-wing cross.

=== Details ===
3 May 2014
20:45 CEST

Rennes	0–2	Guingamp
	Report; Report	Martins Pereira 37'; Yatabaré 46'

Stade de France, Saint-Denis
Attendance: 80,000
Referee: Tony Chapron (Rhône-Alpes)

RENNES:
GK	1	(France) Benoît Costil
RB	29	(France) Romain Danzé (c)
CB	5	(Cameroon) Jean-Armel Kana-Biyik
CB	22	(France) Sylvain Armand
LB	12	(France) Steven Moreira
CM	23	(Norway) Anders Konradsen	(substituted off) 62'
CM	28	(France) Abdoulaye Doucouré
CM	15	(Cameroon) Jean Makoun	(substituted off) 68'
RW	6	(Poland) Kamil Grosicki	(substituted off) 52'
LW	19	(France) Romain Alessandrini
FW	9	(Sweden) Ola Toivonen
Substitutes:
GK	30	(Senegal) Cheikh N'Diaye
DF	21	(Ghana) John Boye
MF	10	(Algeria) Foued Kadir
MF	14	(France) Tiémoué Bakayoko
MF	17	(France) Vincent Pajot	(substituted on) 68'
FW	11	(Portugal) Nélson Oliveira	(substituted on) 62'
FW	24	(France) Paul-Georges Ntep	(substituted on) 52'
Manager:
(France) Philippe Montanier

GUINGAMP:
GK	30	(Mali) Mamadou Samassa
RB	6	(France) Jonathan Martins Pereira
CB	29	(France) Christophe Kerbrat
CB	15	(France) Jérémy Sorbon
LB	7	(France) Dorian Lévêque
CM	10	(France) Younousse Sankharé
CM	18	(France) Lionel Mathis (c)
RM	8	(France) Claudio Beauvue	(substituted off) 84'
LM	11	(France) Steeven Langil	(substituted off) 79'
FW	13	(France) Christophe Mandanne	(substituted off) 69'
FW	9	(Mali) Mustapha Yatabaré
Substitutes:
GK	16	(Cameroon) Guy N'dy Assembé
DF	4	(Guinea) Baissama Sankoh
MF	5	(Senegal) Mustapha Diallo	(substituted on) 69'
MF	26	(France) Thibault Giresse	(substituted on) 79'
MF	28	(France) Fatih Atık	(substituted on) 84'
FW	14	(Republic of the Congo) Ladislas Douniama
FW	17	(Morocco) Rachid Alioui
Manager:
(France) Jocelyn Gourvennec

MATCH OFFICIALS

- Assistant referees:
  - Johann Perruaux (Basse Normandie)
  - Alexandre Viala (Midi-Pyrénées)
- Fourth official: Mathieu Grosbost (Rhône-Alpes)
- Additional assistant referees:
  - Benoît Bastien (Lorraine)
  - Benoît Millot (Île-de-France)

MAN OF THE MATCH

- TBD

MATCH RULES

- 90 minutes.
- 30 minutes of extra-time if necessary.
- Penalty shoot-out if scores still level.
- Seven named substitutes.
- Maximum of three substitutions.
