= Marcus Coco =

Guadeloupean footballer (born 1996)

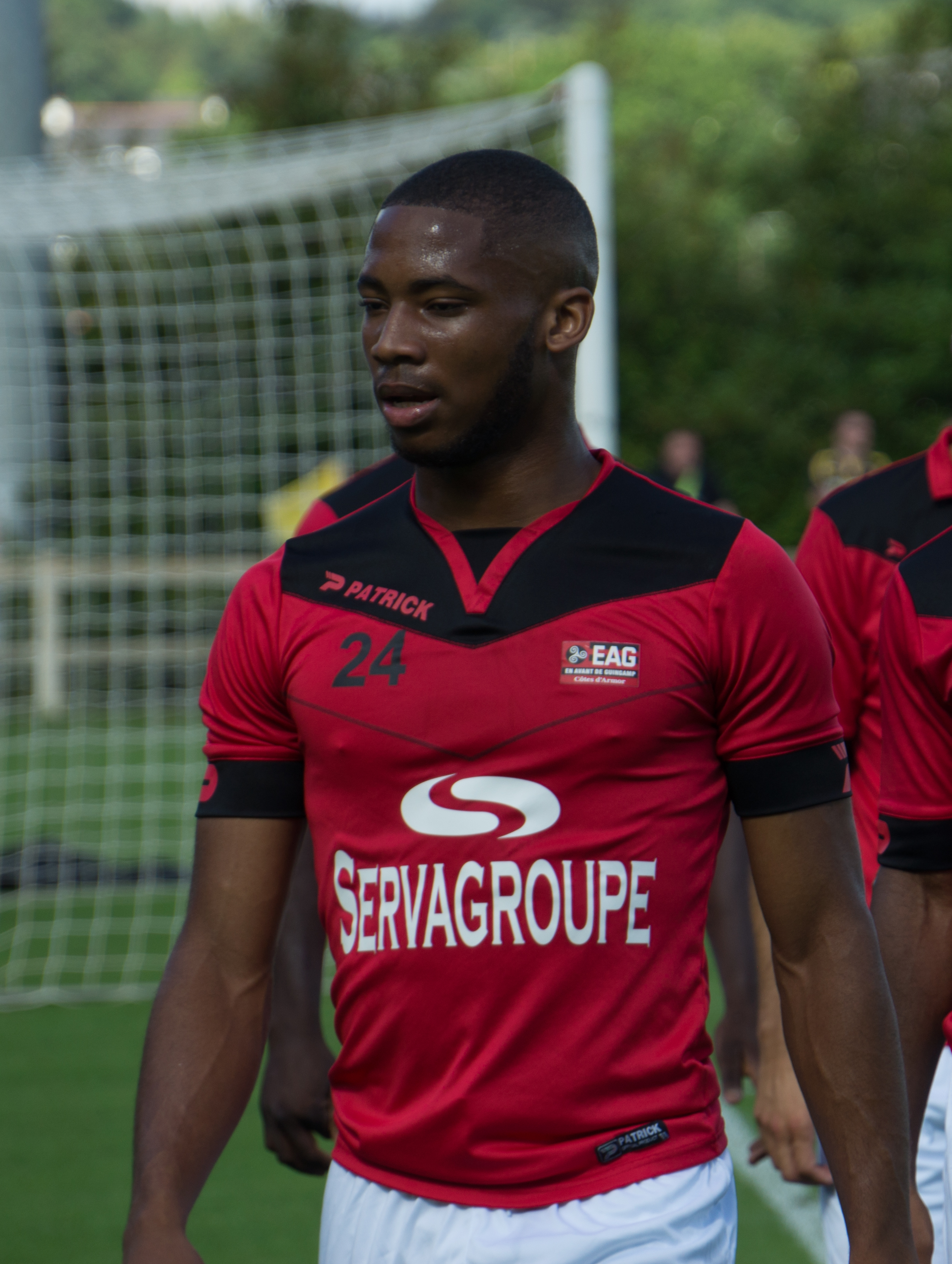
- Coco with Guingamp in 2016

Personal information
- Full name: Marcus Regis Coco
- Date of birth: 24 June 1996 (age 30)
- Place of birth: Les Abymes, Guadeloupe
- Height: 1.84 m (6 ft 0 in)
- Positions: Right-back; right winger

Team information
- Current team: Hapoel Tel Aviv
- Number: 97

Youth career
- 2003–2005: Intrépides
- 2005–2012: Solidarité Scolaire
- 2012: Drancy
- 2013: Jeunesse Aubervilliers
- 2013–2015: Guingamp

Senior career*
Years	Team	Apps	(Gls)
2014–2015	Guingamp B	15	(1)
2015–2019	Guingamp	129	(8)
2019–2025	Nantes	131	(3)
2023–2024	Nantes B	2	(2)
2025–2026	CFR Cluj	9	(0)
2026–	Hapoel Tel Aviv	12	(0)

International career^{‡}
2015–2019	France U21	17	(1)
2023–	Guadeloupe	6	(0)
- * Club domestic league appearances and goals as of 7 December 2025 ‡ National team caps and goals as of 9 September 2024

Marcus Regis Coco (born 24 June 1996) is a Guadeloupean professional footballer who plays as a right-back or a right winger for Israeli Premier League club Hapoel Tel Aviv and for the Guadeloupe national team.

== Club career ==
Coco is a youth exponent from EA Guingamp. He made his Ligue 1 debut on 1 February 2015 against Girondins de Bordeaux starting the match and being substituted after 60 minutes for Lionel Mathis.

He made his 10th appearance in the 2016–17 season by scoring a brace in a 1–3 away win over Lyon on 22 October 2016.

In July 2019, following Guingamp's relegation from Ligue 1, Coco joined FC Nantes.

== International career ==
In October 2023, Coco was called up to the Guadeloupe national team for a set of 2023–24 CONCACAF Nations League matches. He debuted in a 2–1 loss to Saint Lucia on 12 October 2023.

== Career statistics ==
=== Club ===
As of match played 7 December 2025

Appearances and goals by club, season and competition
Club	Season	League			Cup		League cup		Europe		Other		Total	
Club	Season	Division	Apps	Goals	Apps	Goals	Apps	Goals	Apps	Goals	Apps	Goals	Apps	Goals
Guingamp B	2013–14	CFA 2	1	0	—		—		—		—		1	0
Guingamp B	2014–15	CFA 2	13	1	—		—		—		—		13	1
Guingamp B	2015–16	CFA 2	1	0	—		—		—		—		1	0
Guingamp B	Total		15	1	—		—		—		—		15	1
Guingamp	2014–15	Ligue 1	3	0	1	0	1	0	0	0	—		5	0
Guingamp	2015–16	Ligue 1	30	1	2	0	1	0	—		—		33	1
Guingamp	2016–17	Ligue 1	34	4	4	0	2	0	—		—		40	4
Guingamp	2017–18	Ligue 1	29	2	2	1	1	0	—		—		32	3
Guingamp	2018–19	Ligue 1	33	1	3	0	4	0	—		—		40	1
Guingamp	Total		129	8	12	1	9	0	0	0	—		150	9
Nantes	2019–20	Ligue 1	1	0	0	0	0	0	—		—		1	0
Nantes	2020–21	Ligue 1	32	0	1	0	—		—		2 (Note: Appearances in Ligue 1 relegation/promotion play-offs)	0	35	0
Nantes	2021–22	Ligue 1	24	1	4	0	—		—		—		28	1
Nantes	2022–23	Ligue 1	26	1	4	0	—		5 (Note: Appearances in UEFA Europa League)	0	1 (Note: Appearance in Trophée des Champions)	0	36	1
Nantes	2023–24	Ligue 1	28	1	2	0	—		—		—		30	1
Nantes	2024–25	Ligue 1	20	0	2	0	—		—		—		22	0
Nantes	Total		131	3	13	0	0	0	5	0	3	0	152	3
Nantes B	2022–23	Championnat National 2	1	0	—		—		—		—		1	0
Nantes B	2024–25	Championnat National 3	1	2	—		—		—		—		1	2
Nantes B	Total		2	2	—		—		—		—		2	2
CFR Cluj	2025–26	Liga I	9	0	1	0	—		—		—		10	0
Hapoel Tel Aviv	2025–26	Israeli Premier League	0	0	0	0	—		—		—		0	0
Career total			286	14	26	1	9	0	5	0	3	0	329	15

=== International ===
As of match played 9 September 2024

Appearances and goals by national team and year
National team	Year	Apps	Goals
Guadeloupe	2023	4	0
Guadeloupe	2024	2	0
Total		6	0

== Honours ==
Guingamp

- Coupe de la Ligue runner-up: 2018–19

Nantes

- Coupe de France: 2021–22
- Trophée des Champions runner-up: 2022
