= Théo Guivarch =

French footballer (born 1995)

Personal information
- Date of birth: 17 November 1995 (age 30)
- Place of birth: Lorient, France
- Height: 1.95 m (6 ft 5 in)
- Position: Goalkeeper

Team information
- Current team: Clermont
- Number: 30

Youth career
- Lorient

Senior career*
| Years | Team | Apps | (Gls) |
| 2013–2015 | Lorient B | 5 | (0) |
| 2015–2020 | Guingamp B | 30 | (0) |
| 2015–2020 | Guingamp | 7 | (0) |
| 2017–2018 | → Concarneau (loan) | 32 | (0) |
| 2018–2019 | → Cholet (loan) | 33 | (0) |
| 2020–2021 | Rodez | 16 | (0) |
| 2021–2024 | Neuchâtel Xamax | 104 | (0) |
| 2024– | Clermont | 48 | (0) |
- * Club domestic league appearances and goals as of 12 May 2026

Théo Guivarch (Note: French pronunciation: [teo ɡivaʁk], [ɡivaʁ] and erroneously [ɡivarʃ], Breton: [ɡɥivarx] or [ɡivar]) (born 17 November 1995) is a French professional footballer who plays as a goalkeeper for Ligue 2 club Clermont.

== Career ==
Born in Lorient, Guivarch began playing football with local side FC Lorient. He did not make any Ligue 1 appearances for the club, and moved to Guingamp.

In June 2018, Guivarch agreed a loan move to Cholet.

On 17 July 2024, Guivarch signed a two-season contract with Clermont.

== Personal life ==
Guivarch is not related to former France international footballer Stéphane Guivarc'h.

== Career statistics ==
As of match played 9 May 2026

Appearances and goals by club, season and competition
| Club | Season | League | | | National cup | | League cup | | Total | |
| Club | Season | Division | Apps | Goals | Apps | Goals | Apps | Goals | Apps | Goals |
|---|---|---|---|---|---|---|---|---|---|---|
| Laval | 2013–14 | CFA 2 | 3 | 0 | — | | — | | 3 | 0 |
| Laval | 2014–15 | CFA | 2 | 0 | — | | — | | 2 | 0 |
| Laval | Total | | 5 | 0 | 0 | 0 | 0 | 0 | 5 | 0 |
| Guingamp B | 2015–16 | CFA 2 | 13 | 0 | — | | — | | 13 | 0 |
| Guingamp B | 2016–17 | CFA 2 | 14 | 0 | — | | — | | 14 | 0 |
| Guingamp B | 2019–20 | Championnat National 2 | 3 | 0 | — | | — | | 3 | 0 |
| Guingamp B | Total | | 30 | 0 | 0 | 0 | 0 | 0 | 30 | 0 |
| Guingamp | 2015–16 | Ligue 1 | 0 | 0 | 0 | 0 | 0 | 0 | 0 | 0 |
| Guingamp | 2016–17 | Ligue 1 | 1 | 0 | 0 | 0 | 0 | 0 | 1 | 0 |
| Guingamp | 2019–20 | Ligue 2 | 7 | 0 | 1 | 0 | 1 | 0 | 9 | 0 |
| Guingamp | Total | | 8 | 0 | 1 | 0 | 1 | 0 | 10 | 0 |
| Concarneau (loan) | 2017–18 | Championnat National | 32 | 0 | 4 | 0 | — | | 36 | 0 |
| Cholet (loan) | 2018–19 | Championnat National | 33 | 0 | 2 | 0 | — | | 35 | 0 |
| Rodez | 2020–21 | Ligue 2 | 16 | 0 | 2 | 0 | — | | 18 | 0 |
| Neuchâtel Xamax | 2021–22 | Swiss Challenge League | 35 | 0 | 1 | 0 | — | | 36 | 0 |
| Neuchâtel Xamax | 2022–23 | Swiss Challenge League | 35 | 0 | 2 | 0 | — | | 37 | 0 |
| Neuchâtel Xamax | 2023–24 | Swiss Challenge League | 34 | 0 | 1 | 0 | — | | 35 | 0 |
| Neuchâtel Xamax | Total | | 104 | 0 | 4 | 0 | — | | 108 | 0 |
| Clermont | 2024–25 | Ligue 2 | 15 | 0 | 3 | 0 | — | | 20 | 0 |
| Clermont | 2025–26 | Ligue 2 | 33 | 0 | 0 | 0 | — | | 33 | 0 |
| Clermont | Total | | 48 | 0 | 3 | 0 | — | | 53 | 0 |
| Career total | | | 276 | 0 | 16 | 0 | 1 | 0 | 283 | 0 |
