= Ludovic Blas =

Martiniquais footballer (born 1997)

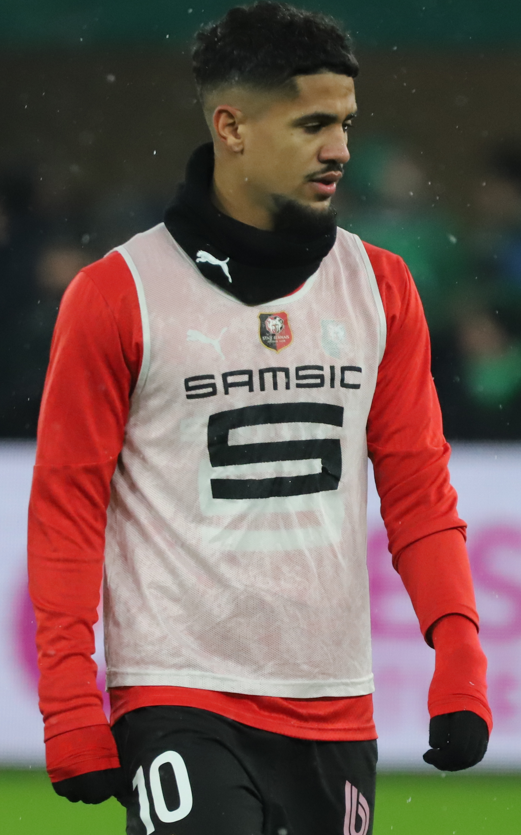
- Blas with Rennes in 2025

Personal information
- Full name: Ludovic Régis Arsène Blas
- Date of birth: 31 December 1997 (age 28)
- Place of birth: Colombes, France
- Height: 1.80 m (5 ft 11 in)
- Position: Winger

Team information
- Current team: Rennes
- Number: 10

Youth career
- 2003–2005: Domont
- 2005–2009: Rambouillet
- 2009–2013: Montrouge
- 2013–2015: Guingamp

Senior career*
Years	Team	Apps	(Gls)
2014–2017	Guingamp B	33	(4)
2015–2019	Guingamp	109	(6)
2019–2023	Nantes	134	(33)
2023–	Rennes	90	(15)

International career^{‡}
2013	France U17	1	(0)
2016	France U19	11	(6)
2016–2018	France U20	14	(1)
2026–	Martinique	4	(0)
- * Club domestic league appearances and goals as of 19 May 2026 ‡ National team caps and goals as of 5 October 2026

Ludovic Régis Arsène Blas (born 31 December 1997) is a professional footballer who plays as a winger for Ligue 1 club Rennes. Born in mainland France, he represents Martinique internationally.

== Club career ==
=== Guingamp ===
Blas arrived at Rambouillet FC at the age of 7. He already stood out from the crowd and was systematically outclassed. His trainer at the time already praised his dribbling skills and his vision of the game.

Following his father's professional transfer, Blas joined Montrouge FC, allowing him to travel the region and facilitate contacts with professional team scouts. He was thus spotted by several clubs, including Monaco and Guingamp. He went through all the stages of the Guingamp training during his first three years at the club before joining the professional group during the training camp of the 2015–16 season. Already under contract until 2020 with Guingamp, Blas signed for an additional season with the Armorican club on August 8, 2018.

=== Nantes ===
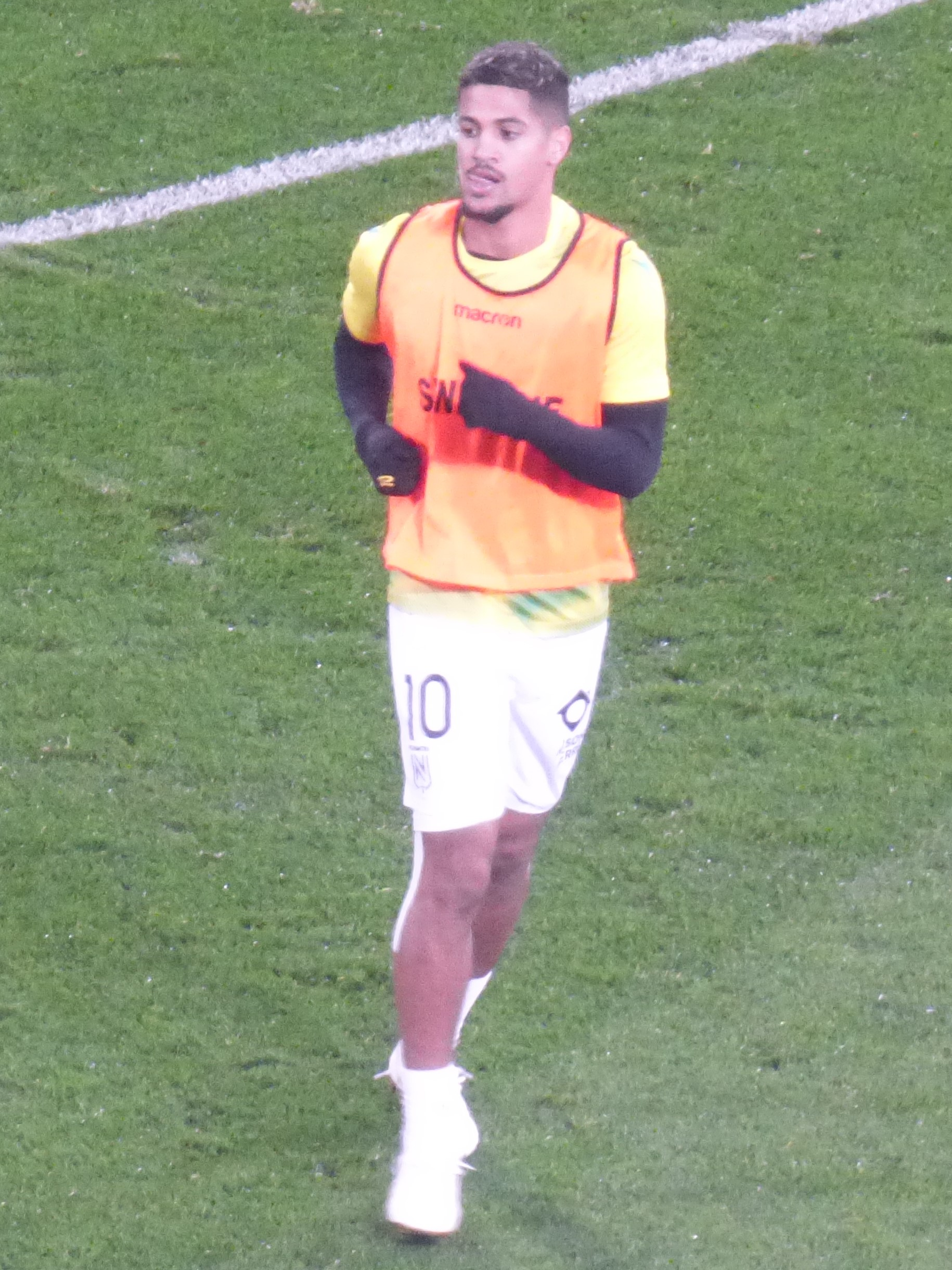
Blas in 2020 during a Nantes pre-match warm-up

On 2 September 2019, Blas signed for Nantes on a five-year contract. On 31 October 2019 he scored his first goals under his new colors in the Coupe de France, against Paris FC (8–0), a historic victory of Nantes concluded by a double of Ludovic Blas, followed by his first goal in Ligue 1, ten days later against Saint-Etienne (3–2). In Nantes, he took a step forward in terms of progression. In his first year in 2019–20, he inserted himself to the squad by scoring 5 goals and making an assist in 24 games played as a midfielder. He exploded in 2020–21, his second season at Nantes, where he became one of the club's key players and played all 38 games of the season, with 11 goals and 4 assists. Despite his improving, Nantes had a difficult season endend competing play-outs against Toulouse. In the 2021–22 season, after 28 games played, 9 goals scored and 3 assists, he helped Nantes win the Coupe de France, scoring the winning goal in the final. At the start of the following season, he played in the 4–0 Trophée des Champions loss to Paris Saint-Germain, that took place at Bloomfield Stadium in Tel Aviv, Israel on 31 July 2022. On 8 September 2022 Blas made his debut in UEFA competitions, in a 2–1 win over the greek side Olympiacos. On 27 October he scored his first goal in UEFA Europa League against Qarabağ.

On 12 February 2023. Blas became Nantes's second top scorer in Ligue 1 in the 21st century with 30 goals, only behind Emiliano Sala on 42 goals.

=== Rennes ===
On 5 July 2023, Blas joined fellow Ligue 1 side Rennes for a reported fee of €15 million.

== International career ==
Born in France, Blas is of Martiniquais descent. He is a youth international for France, having played up to the France U20s.

On 25 September 2026, Blas made his debut for the Martinique national team in a 2026–27 CONCACAF Nations League A game against El Salvador.

== Style of play ==
Blas is a technically gifted winger known for his close control in confined spaces and spell-binding skill in 1v1 situations.

During his spell at EA Guingamp under Jocelyn Gourvennec Blas was often played in midfield double pivots to organize the second phase of build-up and evade pressure in dangerous areas, he also played as wingback in Gourvennec's 5–3–2. Under Antoine Kombouaré, Blas played on the wing, in a midfield two and a midfield three, and behind the striker.

Due to his qualities he has been compared to Riyad Mahrez.

== Career statistics ==
As of match played 17 May 2026

Appearances and goals by club, season and competition
Club	Season	League			Coupe de France		Coupe de la Ligue		Europe		Other		Total	
Club	Season	Division	Apps	Goals	Apps	Goals	Apps	Goals	Apps	Goals	Apps	Goals	Apps	Goals
Guingamp	2015–16	Ligue 1	14	1	2	0	0	0	—		—		16	1
Guingamp	2016–17	Ligue 1	24	1	3	0	2	1	—		—		29	2
Guingamp	2017–18	Ligue 1	31	3	2	0	0	0	—		—		33	3
Guingamp	2018–19	Ligue 1	34	1	2	0	4	0	—		—		40	1
Guingamp	2019–20	Ligue 2	6	0	0	0	1	0	—		—		7	0
Guingamp	Total		109	6	9	0	7	1	—		—		125	7
Nantes	2019–20	Ligue 1	24	5	2	0	2	2	—		—		28	7
Nantes	2020–21	Ligue 1	36	10	1	0	—		—		2 (Note: Appearances in Ligue 1 relegation/promotion play-offs)	1	39	11
Nantes	2021–22	Ligue 1	35	10	6	5	—		—		—		41	15
Nantes	2022–23	Ligue 1	37	7	5	2	—		8 (Note: Appearances in UEFA Europa League)	3	1 (Note: Appearance in Trophée des Champions)	0	51	12
Nantes	Total		134	33	14	7	2	2	8	3	3	1	159	45
Rennes	2023–24	Ligue 1	29	4	5	0	—		8	3	—		42	7
Rennes	2024–25	Ligue 1	29	6	2	0	—		—		—		31	6
Rennes	2025–26	Ligue 1	32	5	3	0	—		—		—		35	5
Rennes	Total		90	15	10	0	—		8	3	—		108	18
Career total			333	54	32	7	9	3	16	6	3	1	391	69

== Honours ==
Guingamp

- Coupe de la Ligue runner-up: 2018–19

Nantes

- Coupe de France: 2021–22

France U19

- UEFA European Under-19 Championship: 2016

Individual

- UEFA European Under-19 Championship Team of the Tournament: 2016
