= Alexis Mané =

French footballer (born 1997)

Personal information
- Date of birth: 30 April 1997 (age 29)
- Place of birth: La Rochelle, France
- Height: 1.76 m (5 ft 9 in)
- Position: Midfielder

Team information
- Current team: Bourges Foot 18
- Number: 8

Youth career
- 2003–2007: AV Maritime Laleu La Pallice
- 2007–2012: La Rochelle
- 2012–2015: Guingamp

Senior career*
Years	Team	Apps	(Gls)
2015–2017	Guingamp B	27	(2)
2016–2017	Guingamp	4	(0)
2017–2018	Les Herbiers II	8	(2)
2018	Les Herbiers	5	(0)
2018	Fontenay	11	(2)
2018–2020	Nantes II	31	(0)
2020–2022	Sète	43	(1)
2022–2023	Le Puy	7	(0)
2023–2024	Versailles	3	(0)
2024–	Bourges Foot 18	4	(0)

International career
2013	France U16	5	(0)
- * Club domestic league appearances and goals as of 19:18, 25 September 2024 (UTC)

Alexis Mané (born 30 April 1997) is a French professional footballer who plays as a midfielder for Championnat National 1 club Bourges Foot 18.

== Club career ==
Mané is a youth exponent from En Avant de Guingamp. He made his Ligue 1 debut on 12 August 2016 against Monaco. Not retained by Guingamp at the end of the 2016–17 season, Mané joined Les Herbiers VF in June 2017. Lacking game time, he moved to Vendée Fontenay Foot in January 2018.

In June 2018, Mané joined the reserve team at FC Nantes, playing in Championnat National 2. After two seasons at the club, he was one of nine players released at the premature conclusion of the 2019–20 campaign.

In May 2020, Mané joined newly promoted Championnat National side Sète.

On 8 July 2022, Mané moved to Le Puy.

On 2 November 2023, Mané joined FC Versailles 78. In July 2024, he then moved to Championnat National 1 club Bourges Foot 18.

== Personal life ==
Mané was born in France and is of Senegalese descent. His sister, Marie, is a professional basketballer in France.
