= Mana Dembélé =

Malian footballer (born 1988)

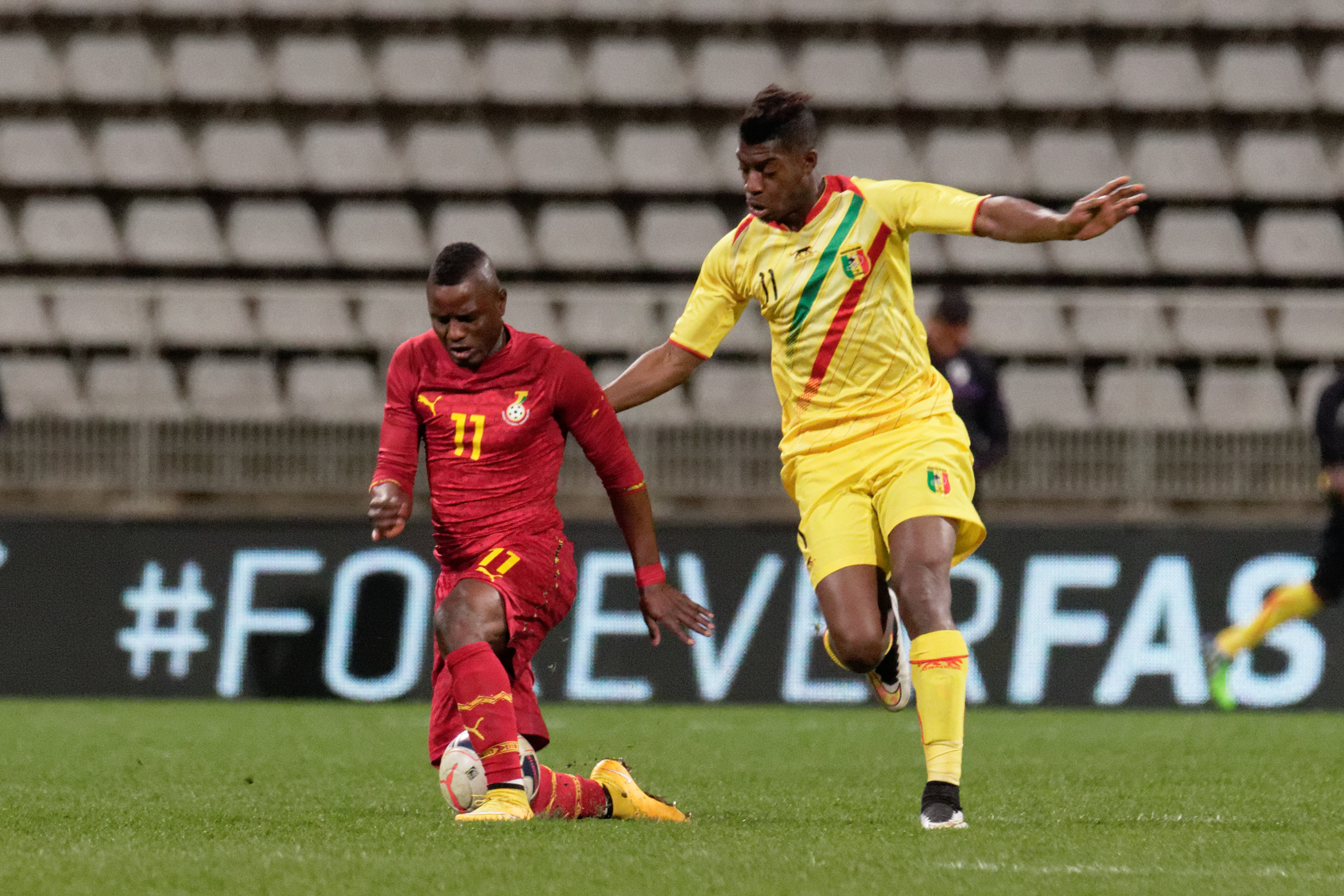
- Dembélé (right) playing for Mali in 2015

Personal information
- Date of birth: 29 November 1988 (age 37)
- Place of birth: Ivry-sur-Seine, France
- Height: 1.80 m (5 ft 11 in)
- Position: Striker

Team information
- Current team: Ivry

Senior career*
Years	Team	Apps	(Gls)
2008–2011	Châteauroux	26	(4)
2010–2011	→ Niort (loan)	29	(6)
2011–2014	Clermont	86	(23)
2014–2016	Guingamp	23	(0)
2014–2015	→ Nancy (loan)	31	(12)
2016–2018	Le Havre	16	(0)
2017	→ Laval (loan)	8	(2)
2020–2022	Racing Union	43	(20)
2023–	Ivry	34	(19)

International career
2013–	Mali	9	(0)
- * Club domestic league appearances and goals as of 8 December 2024

Mana Dembélé (born 29 November 1988) is a professional footballer who plays as a striker for Championnat National 3 club Ivry. Born in France, he represents Mali internationally.

== Career ==
Born in Ivry-sur-Seine, France, Dembélé has played with LB Châteauroux, Chamois Niortais and Clermont. In January 2014 he signed for Guingamp on a three-and-a-half-year deal.

He was called up by Mali for the 2013 African Cup of Nations.
