= Nill De Pauw =

Belgian footballer

Personal information
- Date of birth: 6 January 1990 (age 36)
- Place of birth: Kinshasa, Zaire
- Height: 1.80 m (5 ft 11 in)
- Position: Winger

Youth career
- Lokeren

Senior career*
Years	Team	Apps	(Gls)
2008–2015	Lokeren	172	(28)
2015–2017	Guingamp	41	(4)
2017–2019	Zulte Waregem	40	(7)
2019–2020	Çaykur Rizespor	7	(0)
2020	Atromitos	9	(0)
2020–2022	Antwerp	21	(0)
Total		336	(45)

International career
2005–2006	Belgium U16	16	(5)
2006–2007	Belgium U17	19	(5)
2008	Belgium U18	9	(0)
2007–2009	Belgium U19	15	(8)
2009–2012	Belgium U21	10	(1)
2020	DR Congo	1	(0)
- * Club domestic league appearances and goals

Nill De Pauw (Dutch pronunciation: [ˈnɪl də ˈpʌu], born 6 January 1990) is a Congolese former professional footballer who played as a winger. A former youth international for Belgium, De Pauw represented the DR Congo national team.

== International career ==
De Pauw was born in Zaire to a Belgian father and Congolese mother, and moved to Belgium at a young age. He was a youth international for Belgium. On 9 October 2020, De Pauw represented the DR Congo national team in a friendly 3–0 loss to Burkina Faso.

== Honours ==
Lokeren

- Belgian Cup: 2011–12, 2013–14
