= Dorian Lévêque =

French footballer (born 1989)

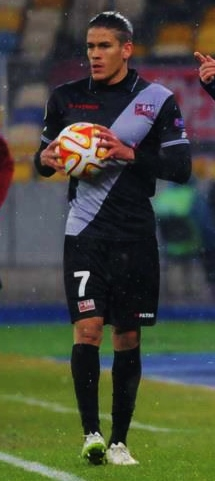

Personal information
- Date of birth: 22 November 1989 (age 36)
- Place of birth: Hyères, France
- Height: 1.80 m (5 ft 11 in)
- Position: Left-back

Youth career
- 2002–2007: FC Annecy

Senior career*
Years	Team	Apps	(Gls)
2008–2009	Boulogne B	25	(4)
2009–2010	Boulogne	6	(0)
2010–2017	Guingamp	115	(4)
2017–2019	PAOK	1	(0)
2019	Annecy	3	(0)
2019–2020	Le Mans	4	(0)
2021	GFA Rumilly-Vallières	1	(0)
- * Club domestic league appearances and goals

Dorian Lévêque (born 22 November 1989) is a retired French footballer who played as a left-back.

== Career ==
Lévêque began his career in 2002 with FC Annecy, where he spent 13 years before signing for US Boulogne in 2008. He made his professional debut in Ligue 1 on 7 March 2010 against Olympique Lyonnais.

In June 2010 En Avant Guingamp signed him on a two-year deal. He spent seven seasons with Guingamp, during which they climbed from France's third tier to Ligue 1, beat Stade Rennais in the 2014 Coupe de France Final, and played in the UEFA Europa League.

On 19 June 2017, Lévêque signed a three-year contract with PAOK. He played in one Super League match before suffering a serious injury, and lost the confidence of the manager. After a dispute between player, club and Hellenic Football Federation, he was finally able to terminate his contract in January 2019.

In February 2019, Lévêque rejoined his formative club, Annecy FC, after training with them for several weeks due to being without a club since the start of the season. The club announced on 6 June that he had left the club again, with the intention of finding a professional club.

In July 2019, he signed for Le Mans, newly promoted to Ligue 2. Injury blighted the season, preventing him from making any first team appearances after August, and he left the club in the summer.

At the end of the 2020-21 season, after a short spell at GFA Rumilly-Vallières, 31-year old Lévêque announced his retirement in October 2021 due to injuries.

== Honours ==
Guingamp

- Coupe de France: 2013–14
