= Mamadou Samassa (footballer, born 1990) =

Footballer (born 1990)

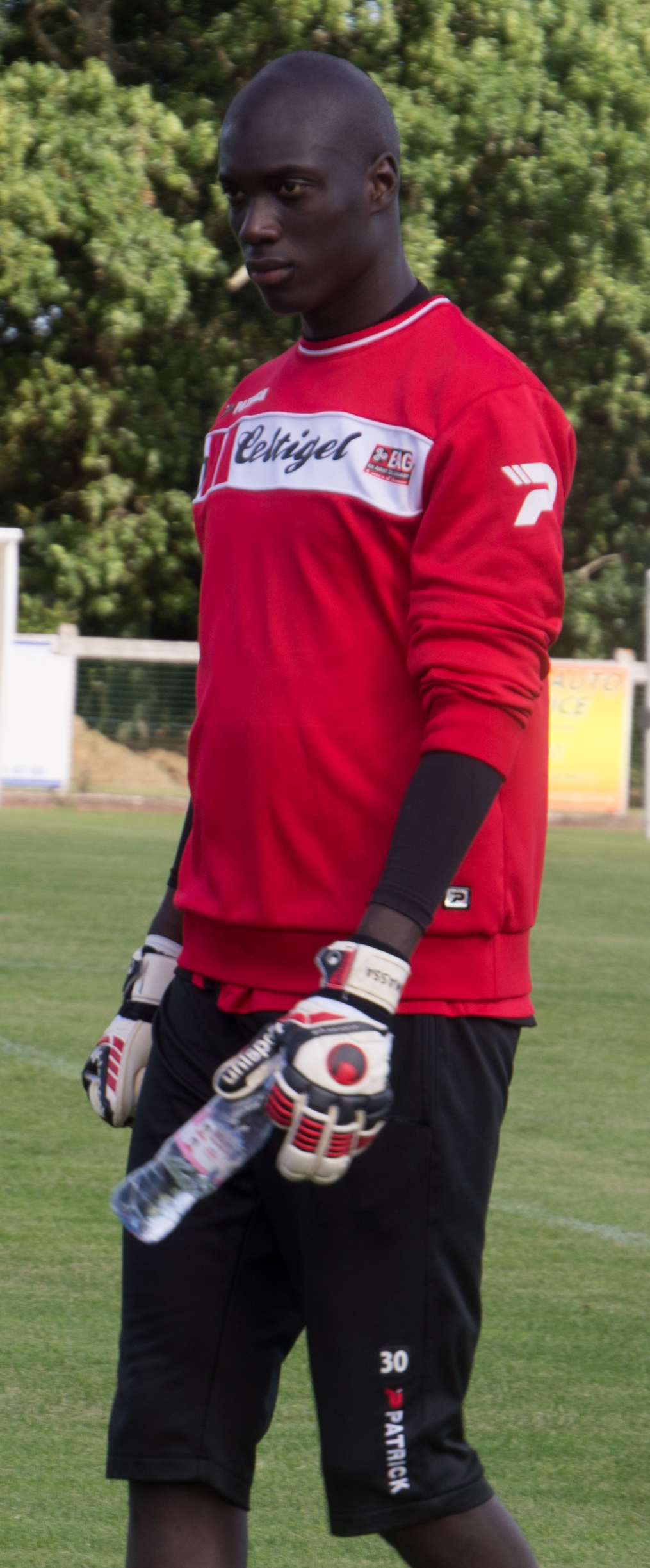
- Samassa training in 2014

Personal information
- Date of birth: 16 February 1990 (age 36)
- Place of birth: Montreuil, France
- Height: 1.97 m (6 ft 6 in)
- Position: Goalkeeper

Team information
- Current team: Laval
- Number: 30

Youth career
- 1996–2003: Collinée-Le Gouray
- 2003–2005: PEF Ploufragan
- 2003–2009: Guingamp

Senior career*
Years	Team	Apps	(Gls)
2009–2016	Guingamp	126	(0)
2013–2016	Guingamp B	3	(0)
2016–2019	Troyes	95	(0)
2019–2021	Sivasspor	51	(0)
2021	Levadiakos	0	(0)
2022	Sri Pahang	21	(0)
2023–	Laval	109	(0)

International career^{‡}
2008	France U18	2	(0)
2008	France U19	1	(0)
2009	France U20	1	(0)
2012–	Mali	20	(0)
Medal record
Men's football
Representing Mali
Africa Cup of Nations
Third place	2013 South Africa
- * Club domestic league appearances and goals as of 19 September 2026 ‡ National team caps and goals as of 21:00, 4 October 2026 (UTC)

Mamadou Samassa (born 16 February 1990) is a professional footballer who plays as a goalkeeper for Ligue 2 club Laval. Born in France, he represented his birth country at youth international level before switching to the Mali national team.

== Club career ==
Samassa was born in Montreuil, Seine-Saint-Denis, but his parents moved to Collinée in Brittany when he was 3 years old.

=== Guingamp ===
Samassa was the starting goalkeeper on Guingamp's 18 ans team that won the 2008–09 edition of the Championnat National 18 ans.

On 23 September 2008, he signed his first professional contract agreeing to a four-year deal until 2013. For the 2010–11 season, he was installed as the club's starting goalkeeper for its campaign in the Championnat National, and stayed with the club during their rise from the third to the first division, remaining first choice keeper throughout. He shares the same name with his older cousin who plays as a striker.

=== Troyes ===
Samassa signed for French Ligue 2 club Troyes on a three-year deal. He made a total of 95 appearance for the club.

=== Sivasspor ===
On 15 June 2019, he signed a two-year contract with Turkish Süper Lig side Sivasspor.

=== Levadiakos ===
Samassa joined Super League Greece 2 side Levadiakos in September 2021.

=== Sri Pahang ===
Samassa completed a move to Malaysia Super League club Sri Pahang in January 2022. He was then released by the club at the end of the season after making 21 league and 5 league cup appearances.

== International career ==
Samassa played his first match for the Mali national team on 13 October 2012, in a game against Botswana.

On 11 December 2025, Samassa was called up to the Mali squad for the 2025 Africa Cup of Nations.

== Career statistics ==
=== Club ===
As of match played 19 September 2026

Appearances and goals by club, season and competition
Club	Season	League			National cup		League cup		Continental		Other		Total	
Club	Season	Division	Apps	Goals	Apps	Goals	Apps	Goals	Apps	Goals	Apps	Goals	Apps	Goals
Guingamp	2010–11	Ligue 3	38	0	1	0	3	0	—		—		42	0
Guingamp	2011–12	Ligue 2	26	0	0	0	1	0	—		—		27	0
Guingamp	2012–13	Ligue 2	33	0	0	0	0	0	—		—		33	0
Guingamp	2013–14	Ligue 1	19	0	6	0	0	0	—		—		25	0
Guingamp	2014–15	Ligue 1	9	0	3	0	0	0	1	0	1 (Note: Appearance in Trophée des Champions)	0	14	0
Guingamp	2015–16	Ligue 1	1	0	0	0	0	0	—		—		1	0
Guingamp	Total		126	0	10	0	4	0	1	0	1	0	142	0
Guingamp B	2013–14	Championnat National 2	1	0	—		—		—		—		1	0
Guingamp B	2014–15	Championnat National 2	1	0	—		—		—		—		1	0
Guingamp B	2015–16	Championnat National 2	1	0	—		—		—		—		1	0
Guingamp B	Total		3	0	0	0	0	0	0	0	0	0	3	0
Troyes	2016–17	Ligue 2	37	0	0	0	1	0	—		2 (Note: Appearances in Ligue 2 promotion playoffs)	0	40	0
Troyes	2017–18	Ligue 1	21	0	2	0	0	0	—		—		23	0
Troyes	2018–19	Ligue 2	37	0	1	0	0	0	—		—		38	0
Troyes	Total		95	0	3	0	1	0	0	0	2	0	101	0
Sivasspor	2019–20	Süper Lig	33	0	0	0	1	0	—		—		34	0
Sivasspor	2020–21	Süper Lig	18	0	0	0	0	0	6	0	—		24	0
Sivasspor	Total		51	0	0	0	1	0	6	0	0	0	58	0
Levadiakos	2021–22	Super League Greece 2	0	0	1	0	0	0	0	0	—		1	0
Sri Pahang	2022	Malaysia Super League	21	0	2	0	3	0	—		—		26	0
Laval	2023–24	Ligue 2	36	0	0	0	—		—		—		36	0
Laval	2024–25	Ligue 2	33	0	0	0	—		—		—		33	0
Laval	2025–26	Ligue 2	33	0	0	0	—		—		2 (Note: Appearances in Ligue 1 relegation/promotion play-offs)	0	35	0
Laval	2026–27	Ligue 2	7	0	0	0	—		—		—		7	0
Laval	Total		109	0	0	0	—		—		2	0	111	0
Career total			407	0	16	0	9	0	7	0	5	0	444	0

=== International ===
As of match played 4 October 2026

Appearances and goals by national team and year
National team	Year	Apps	Goals
Mali	2012	1	0
Mali	2013	5	0
Mali	2014	4	0
Mali	2015	1	0
Mali	2018	1	0
Mali	2019	2	0
Mali	2024	2	0
Mali	2025	2	0
Mali	2026	2	0
Total		20	0

== Honours ==
Guingamp

- Coupe de France: 2013–14

Mali

- Africa Cup of Nations bronze: 2013
