= Reynald Lemaître =

French footballer (born 1983)

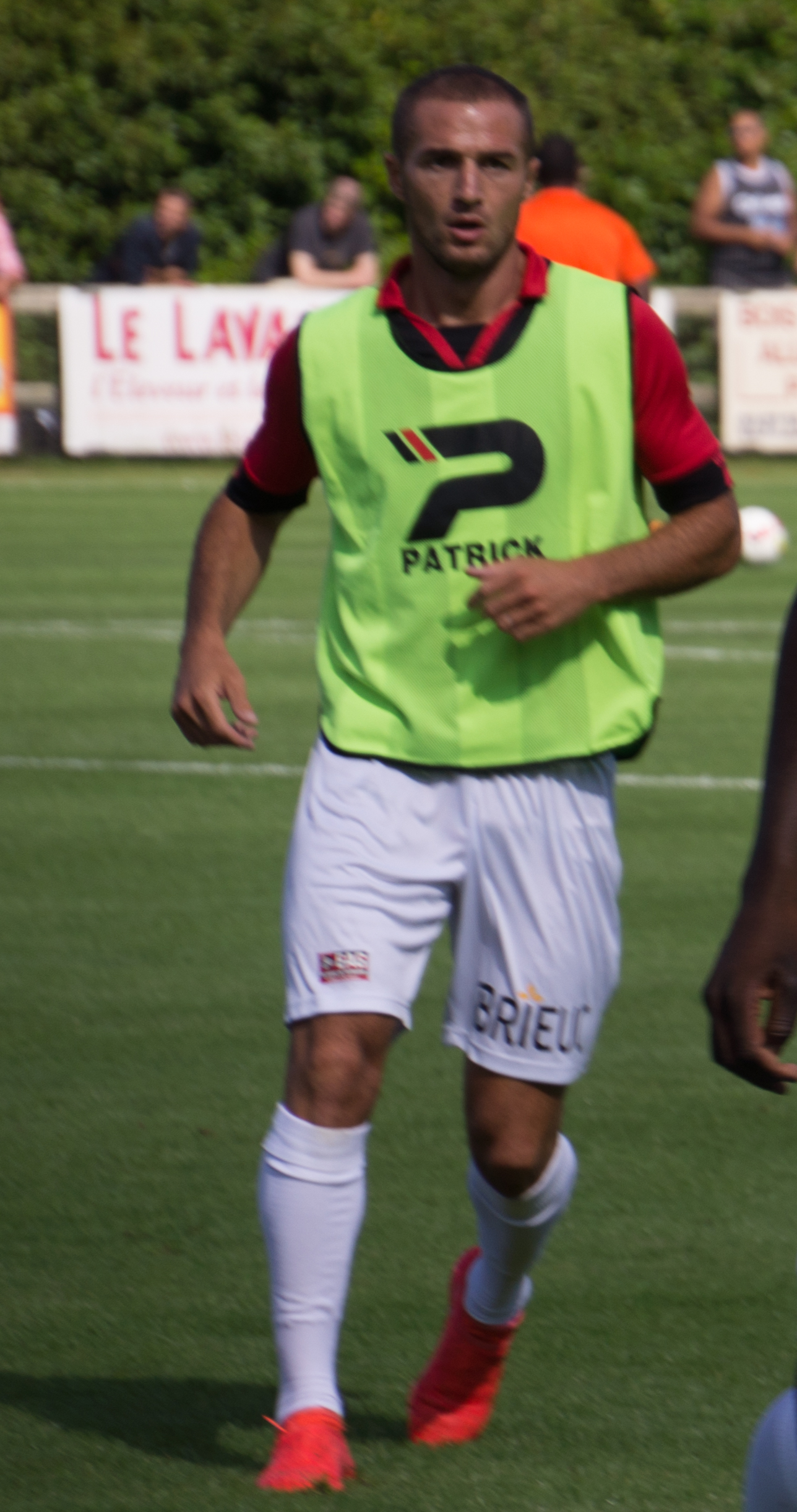
- Lemaître in 2016

Personal information
- Date of birth: 28 June 1983 (age 43)
- Place of birth: Chambray-lès-Tours, France
- Height: 1.75 m (5 ft 9 in)
- Position: Left-back

Senior career*
Years	Team	Apps	(Gls)
2002–2009	Caen	188	(18)
2009–2012	Nancy	74	(2)
2013–2017	Guingamp	55	(0)
2018	A.S. Dragon		
- * Club domestic league appearances and goals

Reynald Lemaître (born 28 June 1983) is a French former professional footballer who played as a left-back.

== Career ==
Lemaître was born in Chambray-lès-Tours, and spent three years at the INF Clairefontaine academy, between 1996 and 1999.

He spent most of his playing career with Stade Malherbe Caen. He scored 18 goals in 188 league matches for the club.

He left Caen to join AS Nancy, signing a three-year contract in 2009.

Having been released by Nancy in summer 2012, Lemaître trialled at Ligue 2 side Guingamp before signing a six-month contract with the club.

In January 2018, he joined Tahitian club A.S. Dragon.
