= Maxime Baca =

French footballer (born 1983)

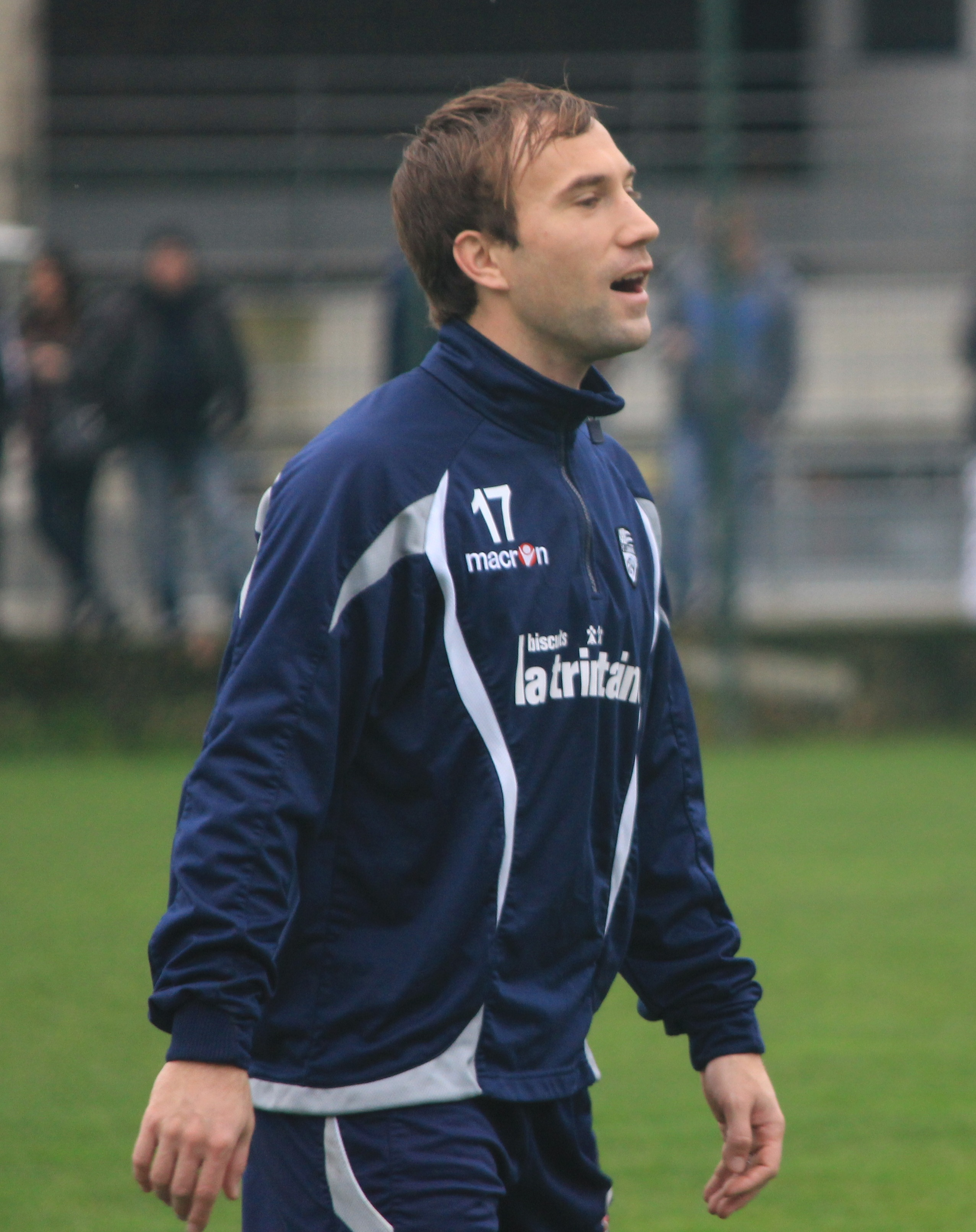
- Baca training with Lorient in 2013

Personal information
- Full name: Maxime Baca
- Date of birth: 2 June 1983 (age 43)
- Place of birth: Corbeil-Essonnes, France
- Height: 1.71 m (5 ft 7 in)
- Position: Defender

Youth career
- 1996–2003: Paris Saint-Germain

Senior career*
Years	Team	Apps	(Gls)
2003–2005	Entente SSG	59	(1)
2005–2009	Le Havre	102	(1)
2009–2014	Lorient	114	(0)
2013	Lorient B	3	(0)
2014–2016	Guingamp	16	(0)
2015–2016	Guingamp B	3	(0)
Total		297	(2)
- * Club domestic league appearances and goals

Maxime Baca (born 2 June 1983) is a French former professional footballer who played as a defender.

== Career ==
Baca spent one year at the INF Clairefontaine academy, between 1997 and 1998.

He began his career by Paris Saint-Germain, before joining L'Entente SSG in July 2003. After two years he left Saint-Gratien and moved to Le Havre AC in Summer 2005. On 2 June 2009, FC Lorient signed him from Le Havre on a free transfer until June 2011.

In June 2014, after five years in Lorient, he agreed to a two-year contract with local rivals En Avant de Guingamp.
