= Yannis Salibur =

French footballer (born 1991)

Personal information
- Full name: Yannis Romaric Salibur
- Date of birth: 24 January 1991 (age 35)
- Place of birth: Saint-Denis, France
- Height: 1.77 m (5 ft 10 in)
- Position: Midfielder

Youth career
- 1999–2006: Red Star
- 2004–2007: INF Clairefontaine
- 2007–2009: Lille

Senior career*
Years	Team	Apps	(Gls)
2008–2011	Lille B	41	(4)
2009–2011	Lille	0	(0)
2011–2012	Boulogne	36	(2)
2012–2015	Clermont	70	(10)
2015–2019	Guingamp	93	(18)
2018–2019	→ Saint-Étienne (loan)	21	(1)
2019–2020	Mallorca	4	(0)
2020–2022	Fatih Karagümrük	29	(0)

International career^{‡}
2007–2008	France U17	11	(0)
2008–2009	France U18	9	(0)
2009–2010	France U19	6	(1)
Medal record
Men's football
Representing France
UEFA European Under-17 Championship
Runner-up	2008 Turkey
- * Club domestic league appearances and goals as of 09:44, 19 January 2022 (UTC) ‡ National team caps and goals as of 6 August 2012

Yannis Romaric Salibur (born 24 January 1991) is a French professional footballer who plays as a midfielder.

== Club career ==
Born in Saint-Denis, Salibur began his career with his local club Red Star Paris. In early 2004, he was one of three Red Star players selected to attend the prestigious Clairefontaine academy. After spending three years there, he signed with Nord-based side Lille OSC.

Despite reported interests from Italian sides Roma, Torino, and Udinese, Salibur signed his first professional contract with Lille in June 2008. The contract was for three years. For the 2008–09 season, he was placed on Lille's first-team squad, though he would not be handed a number. He instead continued playing in the reserves. He made his professional football debut for Lille on 23 January 2009, a day before his 18th birthday, in a Coupe de France match against USL Dunkerque coming on as a substitute in the 76th minute. In his three years at Lille he played in the regional league for the Lille "B" team 41 times scoring 4 goals.

On 13 January 2011, Salibur joined Ligue 2 club US Boulogne on an 18-month contract.

On 6 August 2012, Salibur signed a three-year contract with Ligue 2 side Clermont Foot.

On 31 December 2015, En Avant de Guingamp announced the signing Salibur with the Ligue 1 side, on a three-and-a-half-year contract. Premier League club Hull City agreed a few to sign Salibur on 31 January 2017, but were unable to process the deal before the transfer window closed.

On 31 August 2018, an hour before the closing of the 2018 summer transfer window, Salibur joined league rivals AS Saint-Étienne on loan for the season.

On 22 August 2019, Salibur joined La Liga side RCD Mallorca on a three-year contract. On 17 September of the following year, after the club's relegation, he terminated his contract.

== International career ==
Salibur was born in metropolitan France to a Guadeloupean father, and is also of Congolese descent. He is a France youth international having played for the U-16s, U-17s, and last played for the France U-18 squad. He was a part of the U-17 squad that finished runners-up at the 2008 UEFA European Under-17 Football Championship.
