= Franck Héry =

French footballer (born 1993)

Personal information
- Date of birth: 26 April 1993 (age 33)
- Place of birth: Guingamp, France
- Height: 1.83 m (6 ft 0 in)
- Position: Defender

Team information
- Current team: TA Rennes

Youth career
- –2011: Rennes

Senior career*
Years	Team	Apps	(Gls)
2011–2014	Rennes B	34	(3)
2013–2014	→ Vannes (loan)	9	(0)
2014–2017	Guingamp B	30	(0)
2015–2017	Guingamp	3	(0)
2016–2017	→ Les Herbiers (loan)	10	(0)
2016–2017	→ Les Herbiers B (loan)	1	(0)
2017–2021	Les Herbiers	85	(0)
2017–2019	Les Herbiers B	3	(0)
2021–2022	Granville	29	(3)
2022–2024	Saint Malo	32	(0)
2024–	TA Rennes	5	(0)
- * Club domestic league appearances and goals as of 7 December 2024

Franck Héry (born 26 April 1993) is a French professional footballer who plays as a defender for Championnat National 3 club TA Rennes.

== Honours ==
Les Herbiers

- Coupe de France runner-up: 2017–18
