= Jonathan Martins Pereira =

French footballer (born 1986)

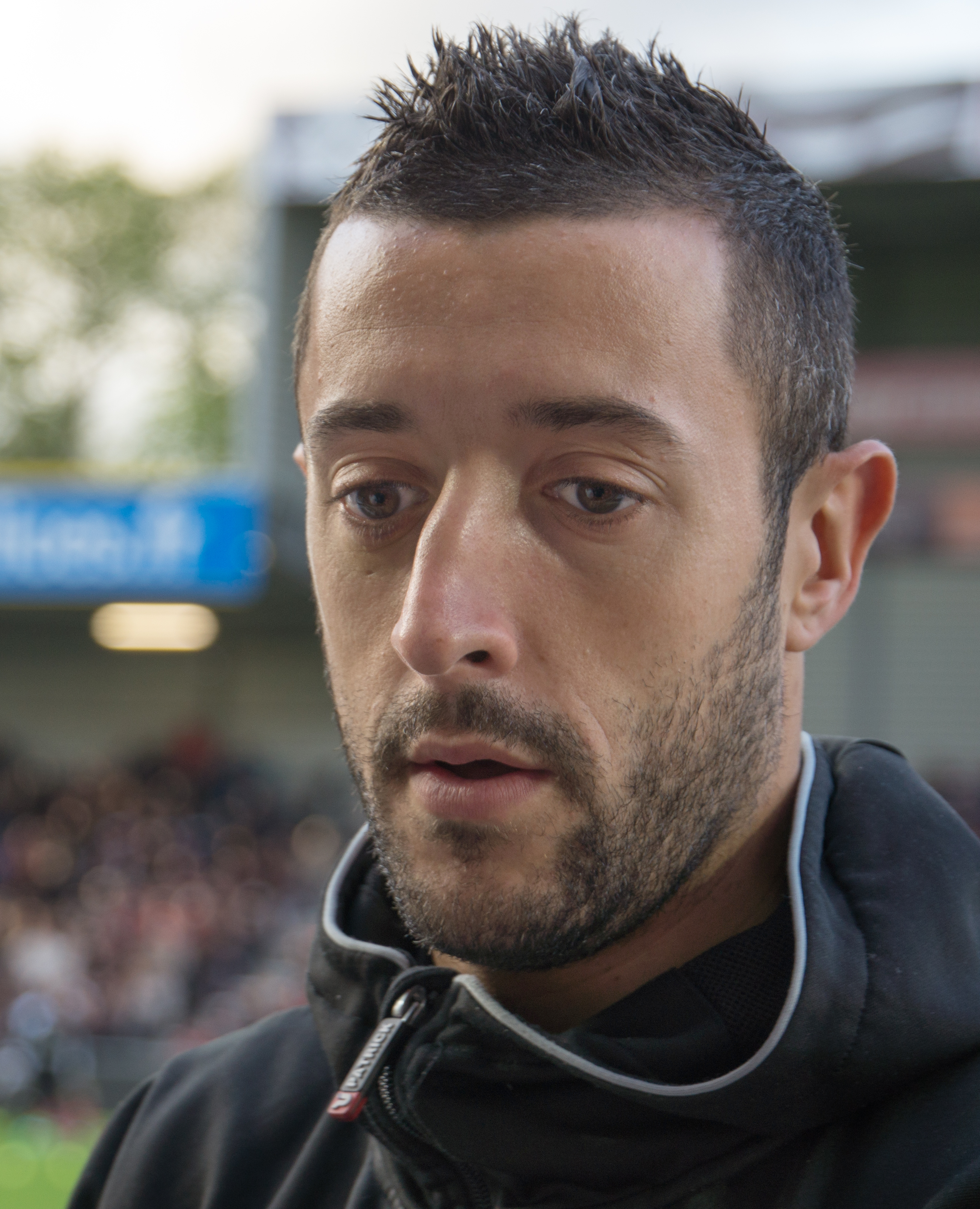
- Pereira with Guingamp in 2014

Personal information
- Date of birth: 30 January 1986 (age 40)
- Place of birth: Bayonne, France
- Height: 1.82 m (6 ft 0 in)
- Position: Defender

Team information
- Current team: Lens (staff)

Youth career
- 1995–1998: AST Foot Tarnos
- 1998–1999: Bayonne
- 1999–2002: Clairefontaine
- 2002–2004: Lens

Senior career*
Years	Team	Apps	(Gls)
2004–2007	Lens	0	(0)
2006–2007	→ Amiens (loan)	15	(0)
2007–2009	Ajaccio	51	(5)
2010–2012	Nantes	54	(2)
2012–2014	Guingamp	56	(0)
2014–2015	Troyes	32	(2)
2015–2018	Guingamp	43	(0)
2018–2020	Lorient	1	(0)
Total		252	(9)

International career
2006–2008	France U21	5	(0)

Managerial career
- 2020–2022: Guingamp (youth)
- 2022–: Lens (staff)
- * Club domestic league appearances and goals

Jonathan Martins Pereira (born 30 January 1986) is a French former professional footballer who played as a defender.

== Club career ==
Born in Bayonne, Pereira began his career with AST Foot Tarnos. In 1998, he moved to Aviron Bayonnais FC. He was later scouted by Lens and played in the training center of club's the youth teams. After two years with Lens, he moved on loan for a season to Amiens.

Pereira played one more season for Lens, before being transferred on a three-year contract to Ajaccio. After a difficult first season in Corsica, his play improved during the 2008–09 season, and he started contributing in attack, scoring 2 goals. During the winter transfer window of the 2009–10 season, he joined Nantes on a 2 1/2-year contract, but could not help the club to earn promotion to Ligue 1.

At the end of his contract, he moved to Guingamp, whom he got promoted to Ligue 1 at the end of the 2012–13 season. On 3 May 2014, he scored Guingamp's opener in the 2014 Coupe de France Final, as they eventually beat Breton rivals Rennes 2–0.

A few months later, after being released by Guingamp, Martins Pereira joined Ligue 2 side Troyes AC on a one-year contract.

After winning the Ligue 2 trophy with Troyes in his first season, he rejoined Guingamp sixteen months later.

In May 2020, Pereira announced his retirement from playing after suffering from a persistent calf injury for two years. He also stated he would return to Guingamp as an educator.

== International career ==
Marins Pereira was born in France to Portuguese parents. He holds French and Portuguese nationalities. He was called up to represent the Portugal U21s, but declined due to injury. He has only represented the France U21s.

== Coaching career ==
After retiring from football at the end of the 2019–20 season, Pereira was hired as a youth coach at his former club Guingamp in September 2020. In July 2022, Pereira returned to RC Lens in a position in the recruitment unit.

== Honours ==
Guingamp

- Coupe de France: 2013–14
