= Christophe Kerbrat =

French footballer (born 1986)

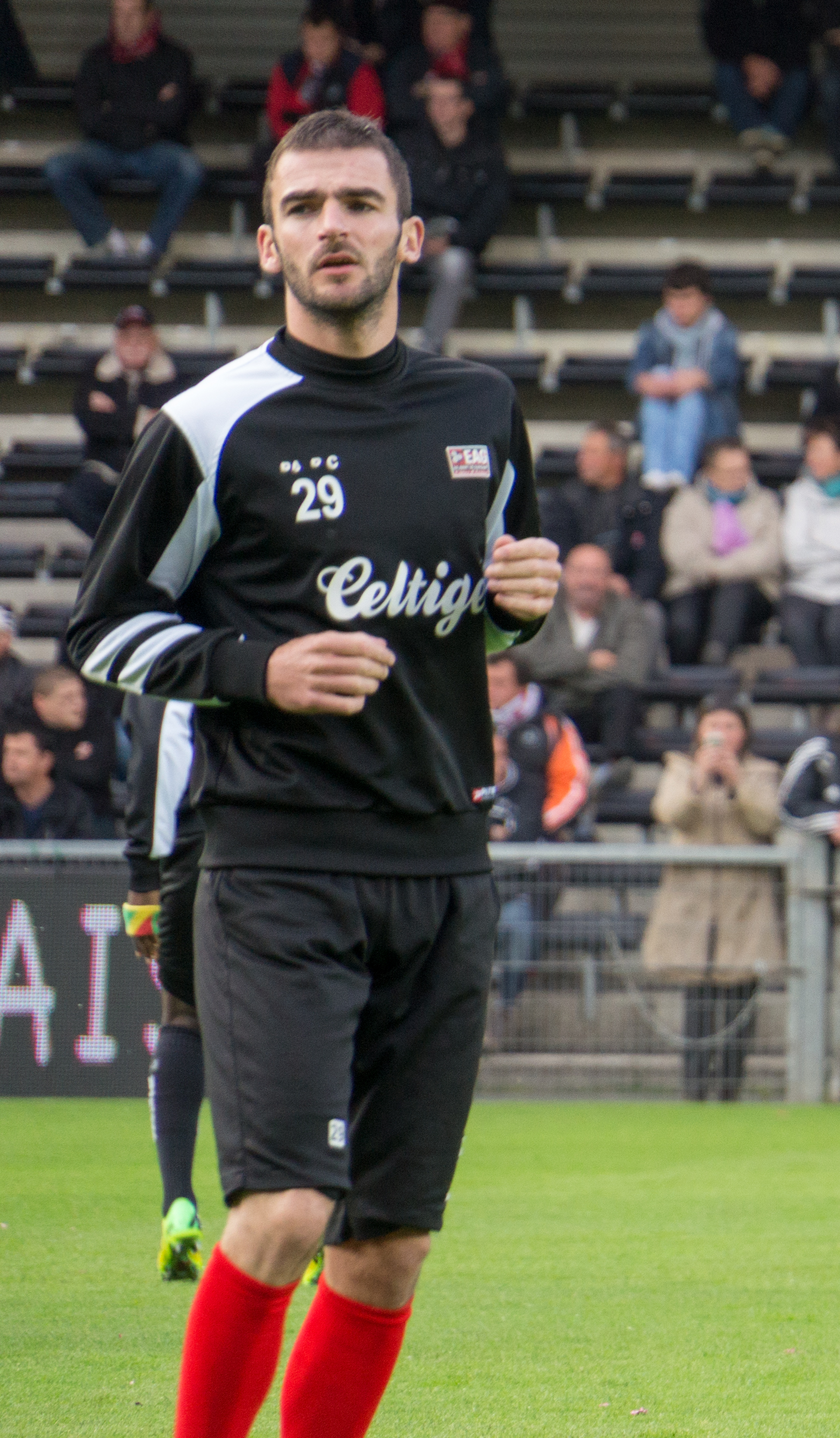

Personal information
- Date of birth: 2 August 1986 (age 40)
- Place of birth: Brest, France
- Height: 1.85 m (6 ft 1 in)
- Position: Centre-back

Youth career
- 2003–2009: Plabennec

Senior career*
Years	Team	Apps	(Gls)
2009–2011	Plabennec	72	(2)
2011–2020	Guingamp	259	(2)
2020–2025	Stade Briochin	123	(5)
- * Club domestic league appearances and goals

Christophe Kerbrat (born 2 August 1986) is a French former professional footballer who played as a centre-back.

== Career ==
Kerbrat learnt football at Stade Plabennecois, where he started playing in the first team, in CFA2 (French 5th division), at the age of 17. By the end of this first season, En Avant de Guingamp wanted him to play with his U19 team, but he refused. He was revealed to the professional world during the 2009–10 Coupe de France, where his club, playing in National (French 3rd division), defeated OGC Nice (Ligue 1) in round of 64, Nancy (L1) in round of 32, and only lost against AJ Auxerre (L1) in round of 16. Then, Stade Brestois and En Avant de Guingamp expressed their interest in the player, considered as the "heart" of the Stade Plabennecois.

Kerbrat finally decided to join Guingamp on 25 June 2011 on a two-year contract. He chose to wear the number 29, in reference to the Finistère, his native department. He won the 2013–14 Coupe de France with the club, and experienced the 2014–15 Europa League, as well as making 194 Ligue 1 appearances, before departing in the summer of 2020.

In October 2020, having been without a club since June, Kerbrat signed for National division side Stade Briochin on an initial one-year contract, with the option to extend.

== Honours ==
Guingamp

- Coupe de France: 2013–14
- Coupe de la Ligue runner-up: 2018–19
