= Lionel Mathis =

French footballer (born 1981)

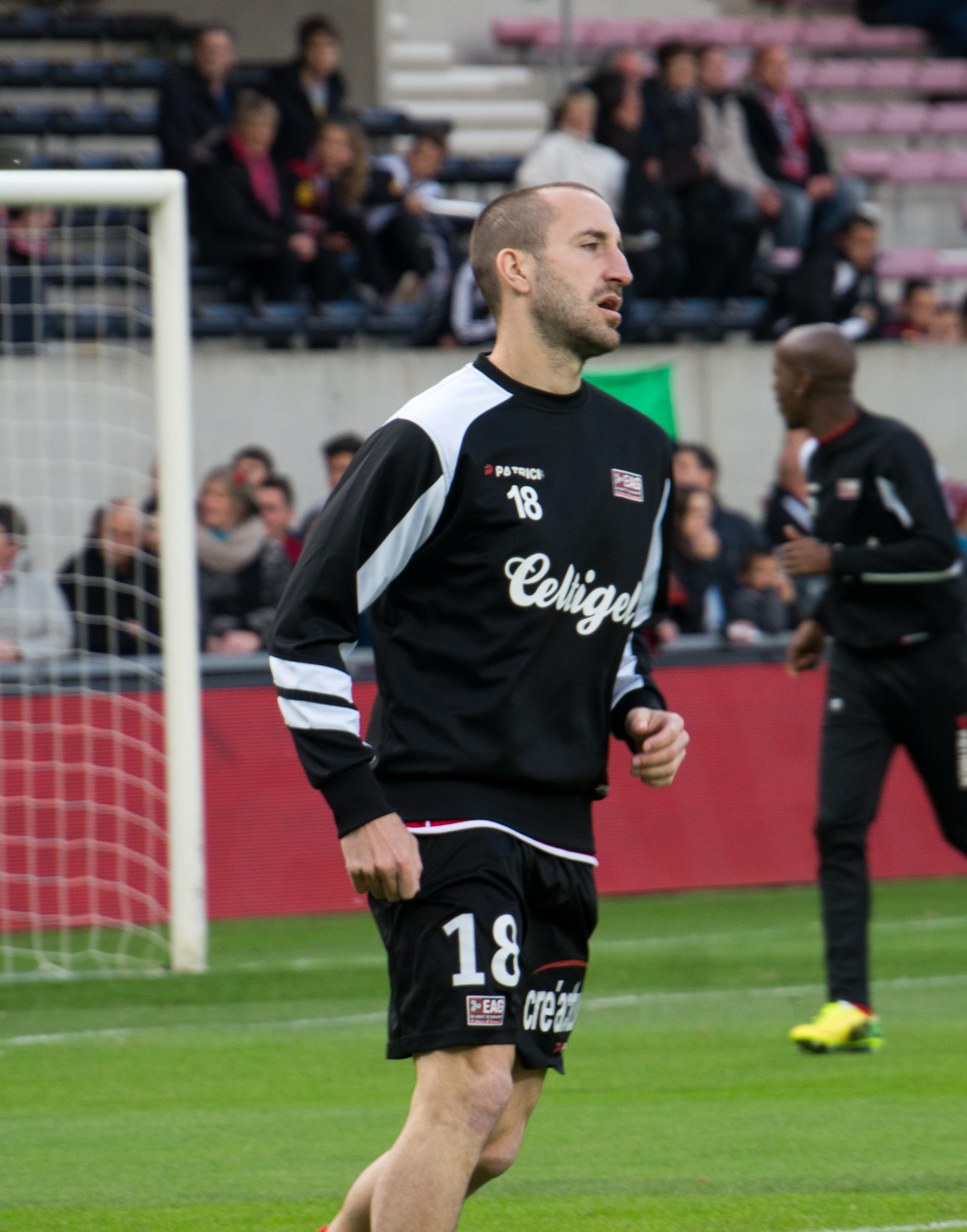
- Mathis in 2014

Personal information
- Date of birth: 4 October 1981 (age 45)
- Place of birth: Montreuil-sous-Bois, France
- Height: 1.74 m (5 ft 9 in)
- Position: Midfielder

Youth career
- 1992–1996: US Vaires
- 1996–1997: US Moissy-Cramayel
- 1997–2001: Auxerre
- → INF Clairefontaine

Senior career*
Years	Team	Apps	(Gls)
2001–2007	Auxerre	181	(16)
2007–2009	Sochaux	17	(0)
2008–2009	→ Guingamp (loan)	32	(0)
2009–2016	Guingamp	243	(9)
2016–2017	Auxerre	26	(2)
Total		499	(27)

International career
2000	France U19		
2001–2002	France U21		
Medal record
Men's football
Representing France
UEFA European Under-21 Championship
Runner-up	2002 Switzerland
- * Club domestic league appearances and goals

Lionel Mathis (born 4 October 1981) is a French former professional footballer who played as a midfielder.

== Career ==
Whilst at Guingamp, then in Ligue 2, Mathis played in the 2009 Coupe de France Final in which his club beat Rennes. He was part of the side which won the Coupe de France again against the same opposition in 2014, this time as a Ligue 1 side.

He retired in the summer 2017.

== Honours ==
Auxerre

- Coupe de France: 2002–03, 2004–05
- Coupe Gambardella: 1999

Guingamp

- Coupe de France: 2008–09, 2013–14

France

- UEFA European Under-18 Championship: 2000
- UEFA European Under-21 Championship runner-up: 2002

Individual

- Ligue 1 Young Player of the Year: 2002–03
