= Thibault Giresse =

French football manager and player (born 1981)

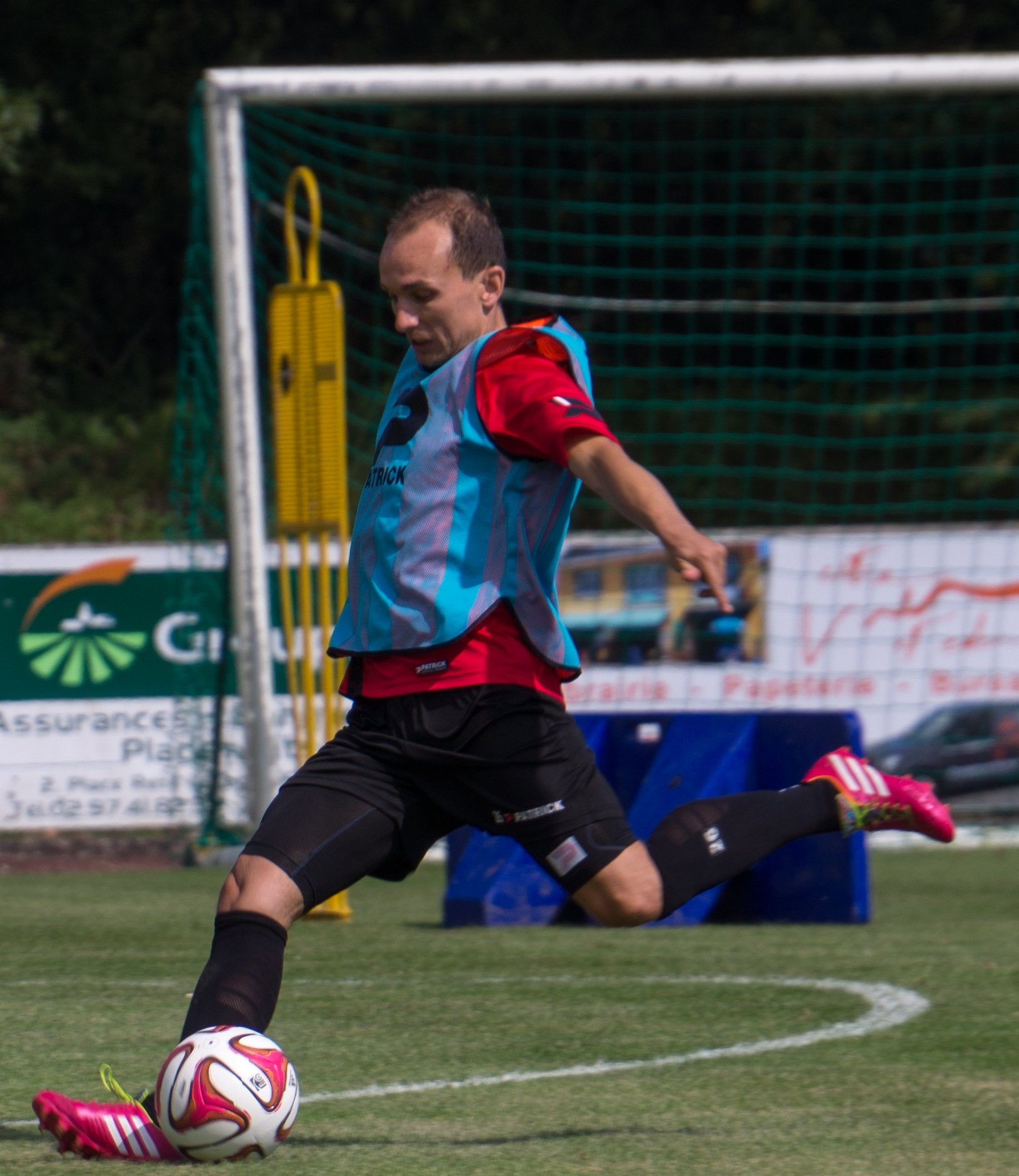
- Giresse training in 2014

Personal information
- Date of birth: 25 May 1981 (age 45)
- Place of birth: Talence, France
- Height: 1.72 m (5 ft 8 in)
- Position: Midfielder

Team information
- Current team: Pau (assistant)

Youth career
- Toulouse

Senior career*
Years	Team	Apps	(Gls)
1999–2006	Toulouse	110	(17)
2004	→ Le Havre (loan)	16	(4)
2006–2009	Amiens	113	(23)
2009–2018	Guingamp	246	(52)
Total		485	(96)

Managerial career
- 2018–2022: Guingamp (assistant)
- 2022–2024: Nîmes (assistant)
- 2024–: Pau (assistant)
- * Club domestic league appearances and goals

Thibault Giresse (born 25 May 1981) is a French professional football manager and former player who is an assistant coach at Ligue 2 club Pau. As a player, he was a midfielder.

== Playing career ==
Giresse signed a two-year contract with Guingamp on 15 June 2009.

== Managerial career ==
On 21 November 2022, Giresse joined Ligue 2 club Nîmes as an assistant coach to newly-appointed head coach Frédéric Bompard, with whom he had worked at Guingamp.

== Personal life ==
He is the son of Alain Giresse.

== Honours ==
Toulouse

- Ligue 2: 2002–03

Guingamp

- Coupe de France: 2013–14
