= Jérémy Sorbon =

French footballer (born 1983)

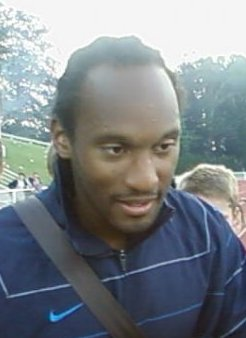
- Sorbon in 2008

Personal information
- Date of birth: 5 August 1983 (age 43)
- Place of birth: Caen, France
- Height: 1.83 m (6 ft 0 in)
- Position: Defender

Youth career
- ASPTT Caen
- 1999–2004: Caen

Senior career*
Years	Team	Apps	(Gls)
2004–2013	Caen	289	(9)
2013–2021	Guingamp	229	(5)
Total		518	(14)
- * Club domestic league appearances and goals

Jérémy Sorbon (born 5 August 1983) is a French former professional footballer who played as a defender.

== Career ==
Born in Caen, Sorbon spent large parts of his career at SM Caen, playing almost 300 games.

In June 2013, with his contract expiring, he signed for the Breton club Guingamp. Few weeks before, Guingamp finished the season 2012–13 one place over Caen and was promoted to the Ligue 1.

During his career, Sorbon appeared in two Coupe de la Ligue finals (once in 2004–05 with Caen and once in 2018–19 with Guingamp).

== Honours ==
Guingamp

- Coupe de France: 2013–14
- Coupe de la Ligue runner-up: 2018–19
