= 2006–07 ES Troyes AC season =

ES Troyes AC
2006–07 season
- President: Thierry Gomez
- Head coach: Jean-Marc Furlan
- Stadium: Stade de l'Aube
- Ligue 1: 18th (relegated)
- Coupe de France: Round of 64
- Coupe de la Ligue: Third round
- Top goalscorer: League: Emmanuel Gigliotti (9); All: Emmanuel Gigliotti (9)
colours	colours

The 2006–07 season was the 21st season in the history of ES Troyes AC and the club's second consecutive season in the top flight of French football. In addition to the domestic league, Troyes participated in this season's edition of the Coupe de France and the Coupe de la Ligue.

== Pre-season and friendlies ==
Win Draw Loss

== Competitions ==
=== Overall record ===
Competition	First match	Last match	Starting round	Final position	Record							
Competition	First match	Last match	Starting round	Final position	Pld	W	D	L	GF	GA	GD	Win %
Ligue 1	5 August 2006	26 May 2007	Matchday 1	18th	38	9	12	17	39	54	−15	23.68
Coupe de France	6 January 2007		Round of 64	Round of 64	1	0	0	1	2	4	−2	0.00
Coupe de la Ligue	20 September 2006		Third round	Third round	1	0	0	1	1	2	−1	0.00
Total					40	9	12	19	42	60	−18	22.50

Source: Competitions

=== Ligue 1 ===
==== League table ====
Pos	Team	Pld	W	D	L	GF	GA	GD	Pts	Qualification or relegation
16	Nice	38	9	16	13	34	40	−6	43	
17	Valenciennes	38	11	10	17	36	48	−12	43	
18	Troyes (R)	38	9	12	17	39	54	−15	39	Relegation to Ligue 2
19	Sedan (R)	38	7	14	17	46	58	−12	35	Relegation to Ligue 2
20	Nantes (R)	38	7	13	18	29	49	−20	34	Relegation to Ligue 2

Source: Ligue 1
Rules for classification: 1) points; 2) goal difference; 3) number of goals scored.
(R) Relegated

==== Results summary ====
Overall								Home						Away					
Pld	W	D	L	GF	GA	GD	Pts	W	D	L	GF	GA	GD	W	D	L	GF	GA	GD
38	9	12	17	39	54	−15	39	8	7	4	29	23	+6	1	5	13	10	31	−21

Source: Ligue 1

==== Results by round ====
Round	1	2	3	4	5	6	7	8	9	10	11	12	13	14	15	16	17	18	19	20	21	22	23	24	25	26	27	28	29	30	31	32	33	34	35	36	37	38
Ground	A	H	A	H	A	H	A	A	H	A	H	A	H	A	H	A	H	A	H	A	H	A	H	A	H	H	A	H	A	H	A	H	A	H	A	H	A	H
Result	L	D	D	L	L	W	L	D	D	L	W	L	L	L	D	W	D	D	D	L	W	D	W	L	W	W	L	L	L	L	D	D	L	W	L	D	L	W
Position	16	13	13	15	19	15	17	17	16	18	16	17	19	19	19	18	18	18	18	18	18	17	16	17	17	15	16	17	17	19	18	18	18	18	18	18	18	18

Source: Ligue 1
A = Away; H = Home; W = Win; D = Draw; L = Loss

==== Matches ====
5 August 2006 1	Lens	1–0	Troyes	Lens

12 August 2006 2	Troyes	2–2	Le Mans	Troyes
				Stadium: Stade de l'Aube

19 August 2006 3	Nantes	1–1	Troyes	Nantes

26 August 2006 4	Troyes	1–2	Toulouse	Troyes
				Stadium: Stade de l'Aube

9 September 2006 5	Lyon	2–0	Troyes	Lyon

16 September 2006 6	Troyes	2–0	Nice	Troyes
				Stadium: Stade de l'Aube

23 September 2006 7	Bordeaux	2–1	Troyes	Bordeaux

30 September 2006 8	Lorient	0–0	Troyes	Lorient

14 October 2006 9	Troyes	1–1	Lille	Troyes
				Stadium: Stade de l'Aube

21 October 2006 10	Valenciennes	3–1	Troyes	Valenciennes

28 October 2006 11	Troyes	3–1	Saint-Étienne	Troyes
				Stadium: Stade de l'Aube

4 November 2006 12	Sochaux	1–0	Troyes	Montbéliard

12 November 2006 13	Troyes	0–4	Monaco	Troyes
				Stadium: Stade de l'Aube

18 November 2006 14	Nancy	1–0	Troyes	Nancy

25 November 2006 15	Troyes	1–1	Marseille	Troyes
				Stadium: Stade de l'Aube

2 December 2006 16	Sedan	1–2	Troyes	Sedan

9 December 2006 17	Troyes	3–3	Auxerre	Troyes
				Stadium: Stade de l'Aube

16 December 2006 18	Rennes	1–1	Troyes	Rennes

23 December 2006 19	Troyes	1–1	Paris Saint-Germain	Troyes
				Stadium: Stade de l'Aube

13 January 2007 20	Le Mans	2–0	Troyes	Le Mans
				Stadium: Stade Léon-Bollée

24 January 2007 21	Troyes	1–0	Nantes	Troyes
				Stadium: Stade de l'Aube

27 January 2007 22	Toulouse	1–1	Troyes	Toulouse
				Stadium: Stadium de Toulouse

4 February 2007 23	Troyes	1–0	Lyon	Troyes
				Stadium: Stade de l'Aube

10 February 2007 24	Nice	3–0	Troyes	Nice
				Stadium: Stade du Ray

17 February 2007 25	Troyes	1–0	Bordeaux	Troyes
				Stadium: Stade de l'Aube

24 February 2007 26	Troyes	3–0	Lorient	Troyes
				Stadium: Stade de l'Aube

3 March 2007 27	Lille	4–0	Troyes	Villeneuve-d'Ascq
				Stadium: Stadium Lille Métropole

10 March 2007 28	Troyes	1–3	Valenciennes	Troyes
				Stadium: Stade de l'Aube

17 March 2007 29	Saint-Étienne	3–1	Troyes	Saint-Étienne

1 April 2007 30	Troyes	0–1	Sochaux	Troyes
				Stadium: Stade de l'Aube

7 April 2007 31	Monaco	0–0	Troyes	Monaco

14 April 2007 32	Troyes	0–0	Nancy	Troyes
				Stadium: Stade de l'Aube

21 April 2007 33	Marseille	2–1	Troyes	Marseille

28 April 2007 34	Troyes	3–2	Sedan	Troyes
				Stadium: Stade de l'Aube

5 May 2007 35	Auxerre	1–0	Troyes	Auxerre

9 May 2007 36	Troyes	2–2	Rennes	Troyes
				Stadium: Stade de l'Aube

19 May 2007 37	Paris Saint-Germain	2–1	Troyes	Paris
				Stadium: Parc des Princes

26 May 2007 38	Troyes	3–0	Lens	Troyes
				Stadium: Stade de l'Aube

=== Coupe de France ===
6 January 2007 Round of 64	FC Libourne-Saint-Seurin	4–2	Troyes	Libourne
21:00				Stadium: Stade Jean-Antoine Moueix; Attendance: 2,612; Referee: Damien Ledentu

=== Coupe de la Ligue ===
20 September 2006 Third round	Troyes	1–2	Le Mans	Troyes
21:00				Stadium: Stade de l'Aube; Attendance: 4,180; Referee: Jean-Charles Cailleux

== Statistics ==
=== Appearances and goals ===
No.	Pos	Nat	Player	Total		Ligue 1		Coupe de France		Coupe de la Ligue	
No.	Pos	Nat	Player	Apps	Goals	Apps	Goals	Apps	Goals	Apps	Goals
Goalkeepers
	GK	(United States) USA	Quentin Westberg	2	0	2	0	0	0	0	0
	GK	(France) FRA	Kévin Grau	2	0	2	0	0	0	0	0
	GK	(France) FRA	Ronan Le Crom	35	0	35	0	0	0	0	0
Defenders
	DF	(France) FRA	Juan-Luis Montero	3	0	3	0	0	0	0	0
	DF	(France) FRA	Auriol Guillaume	9	0	9	0	0	0	0	0
	DF	(France) FRA	Nabil Berkak	9	0	9	0	0	0	0	0
	DF	(France) FRA	Gaël Sanz	15	3	15	3	0	0	0	0
	DF	(Ivory Coast) CIV	Blaise Kouassi	19	0	19	0	0	0	0	0
	DF	(Brazil) BRA	Demetrius Ferreira	24	0	24	0	0	0	0	0
	DF	(Senegal) SEN	Ibrahima Faye	31	0	31	0	0	0	0	0
	DF	(France) FRA	Grégory Paisley	31	1	31	1	0	0	0	0
	DF	(Guinea) GUI	Ibrahima Bangoura	27	2	27	2	0	0	0	0
Midfielders
	MF	(Central African Republic) CTA	Eloge Enza Yamissi	29	0	29	0	0	0	0	0
	MF	(France) FRA	Jonathan Lacourt	19	0	19	0	0	0	0	0
	MF	(Morocco) MAR	Gharib Amzine	23	1	23	1	0	0	0	0
	MF	(France) FRA	Gaël Danic	32	5	32	5	0	0	0	0
	MF	(France) FRA	Yann Lachuer	37	3	37	3	0	0	0	0
	MF	(France) FRA	Cédric Barbosa	30	2	30	2	0	0	0	0
	MF	(France) FRA	Benjamin Nivet	31	6	31	6	0	0	0	0
	MF	(France) FRA	Blaise Matuidi	34	3	34	3	0	0	0	0
Forwards
	FW	(France) FRA	Sébastien Dallet	13	0	13	0	0	0	0	0
	FW	(Poland) POL	Marek Saganowski	6	0	6	0	0	0	0	0
	FW	(Brazil) BRA	Weldon	3	0	3	0	0	0	0	0
	FW	(Ivory Coast) CIV	Georges Ba	8	2	8	2	0	0	0	0
	FW	(Tunisia) TUN	Ziad Jaziri	23	1	23	1	0	0	0	0
	FW	(France) FRA	David Gigliotti	29	9	29	9	0	0	0	0

Source: Competitions
