= 2011–12 Paris Saint-Germain FC season =

42nd season in existence of Paris Saint-Germain

Paris Saint-Germain
2011–12 season
- President: Robin Leproux (until 13 July 2011); Benoît Rousseau (until 7 October 2011); Nasser Al-Khelaifi (from 7 October 2011)
- Head coach: Antoine Kombouaré (until 30 December 2011); Carlo Ancelotti (from 30 December 2011)
- Stadium: Parc des Princes
- Ligue 1: 2nd
- Coupe de France: Quarter-finals
- Coupe de la Ligue: Round of 16
- UEFA Europa League: Group stage
- Top goalscorer: League: Nenê (21); All: Nenê (27)
- Average home league attendance: 43,005
Home colours	Away colours	Third colours

The 2011–12 season was Paris Saint-Germain Football Club's 42nd in existence and their 39th in the top-flight of French football. The team competed in Ligue 1, the Coupe de France, the Coupe de la Ligue and the UEFA Europa League.

== Players ==
Players, transfers, appearances and goals - 2011/2012 season.

=== First-team squad ===
Note: Flags indicate national team as defined under FIFA eligibility rules; some limited exceptions apply. Players may hold more than one non-FIFA nationality.

No.	Pos.	Nation	Player
1	GK	FRA	Nicolas Douchez
2	DF	BRA	Ceará
3	DF	FRA	Mamadou Sakho (captain)
4	DF	SRB	Milan Biševac
5	DF	CIV	Siaka Tiéné
6	DF	FRA	Zoumana Camara
7	MF	FRA	Jérémy Ménez
8	FW	FRA	Péguy Luyindula
9	FW	FRA	Guillaume Hoarau
10	MF	BRA	Nenê
12	MF	FRA	Mathieu Bodmer
13	DF	BRA	Alex
14	MF	FRA	Blaise Matuidi
15	DF	URU	Diego Lugano

No.	Pos.	Nation	Player
16	GK	FRA	Alphonse Areola
17	DF	BRA	Maxwell
18	FW	FRA	Loris Arnaud
19	FW	FRA	Kevin Gameiro
20	MF	FRA	Clément Chantôme
22	DF	FRA	Sylvain Armand
23	MF	MLI	Mohamed Sissoko
25	FW	FRA	Jean-Christophe Bahebeck
26	DF	FRA	Christophe Jallet
27	MF	ARG	Javier Pastore
28	MF	ITA	Thiago Motta
29	MF	COD	Neeskens Kebano
30	GK	ITA	Salvatore Sirigu
40	GK	FRA	Ronan Le Crom

=== Out on loan ===
Note: Flags indicate national team as defined under FIFA eligibility rules; some limited exceptions apply. Players may hold more than one non-FIFA nationality.

No.	Pos.	Nation	Player
—	MF	FRA	Granddi Ngoyi (at Nantes)
—	FW	BRA	Éverton Santos (at Seongnam Ilhwa Chunma)

No.	Pos.	Nation	Player
—	FW	HAI	Jean-Eudes Maurice (at Lens)
—	DF	FRA	Loïck Landre (at Clermont)

=== Transfers in ===
Note: Flags indicate national team as defined under FIFA eligibility rules; some limited exceptions apply. Players may hold more than one non-FIFA nationality.

No.	Pos.	Nation	Player
—	GK	FRA	Nicolas Douchez (from Rennes) (free)
—	FW	FRA	Kevin Gameiro (from Lorient) (€11 million)
—	DF	SRB	Milan Biševac (from Valenciennes) (undisclosed)
—	MF	FRA	Jérémy Ménez (from Roma) (€8 million)
—	MF	FRA	Blaise Matuidi (from Saint-Étienne) (€7.5 million)
—	MF	MLI	Mohamed Sissoko (from Juventus) (€7 million)
—	GK	ITA	Salvatore Sirigu (from Palermo) (€3.895 million)

No.	Pos.	Nation	Player
—	MF	ARG	Javier Pastore (from Palermo) (€39.8 million)
—	DF	URU	Diego Lugano (from Fenerbahçe) (€3 million)
—	DF	BRA	Maxwell (from Barcelona) (€3.5 million)
—	GK	FRA	Ronan Le Crom (free agent)
—	DF	BRA	Alex (from Chelsea) (£4.2 million)
—	MF	ITA	Thiago Motta (from Internazionale) (€10 million)

=== Transfers out ===
Note: Flags indicate national team as defined under FIFA eligibility rules; some limited exceptions apply. Players may hold more than one non-FIFA nationality.

No.	Pos.	Nation	Player
—	MF	FRA	Claude Makélélé (retired)
—	GK	FRA	Grégory Coupet (retired)
—	GK	ARM	Apoula Edel (to Hapoel Tel Aviv)
—	DF	MLI	Sammy Traoré (free agent)
—	FW	FRA	Ludovic Giuly (to Monaco)

No.	Pos.	Nation	Player
—	MF	FRA	Younousse Sankharé (to Dijon)
—	DF	FRA	Tripy Makonda (to Brest)
—	MF	FRA	Jérémy Clément (to Saint-Étienne)
—	FW	TUR	Mevlüt Erdinç (to Rennes)

== Transfers ==
In

No.	Pos.	Nat.	Name	Age	EU	Moving from	Type	Transfer window	Ends	Transfer fee	Source
17	DM	(France)	Granddi Ngoyi	23	EU	Brest	Loan Return	Summer	2013		
18	FW	(France)	Loris Arnaud	24	EU	Angers	Loan Return	Summer	2012		
27	LW	(France)	Younousse Sankharé	21	EU	Dijon	Loan Return	Summer	2012		
1	GK	(France)	Nicolas Douchez	31	EU	Rennes	Signed	Summer	2014	Free	
19	FW	(France)	Kevin Gameiro	24	EU	Lorient	Signed	Summer	2015	€11M	
28	CB	(France)	Loïck Landre	19	EU	Youth system	Signed Pro	Summer	2014		
25	FW	(France)	Jean-Christophe Bahebeck	18	EU	Youth system	Signed Pro	Summer	2014		
29	AM	(France)	Neeskens Kebano	19	EU	Youth system	Signed Pro	Summer	2014		
4	CB	(Serbia)	Milan Biševac	28	Non-EU	Valenciennes	Signed	Summer	2014	€3.2M	
7	RW	(France)	Jérémy Ménez	24	EU	Roma (Italy)	Signed	Summer	2014	€8M	
14	DM	(France)	Blaise Matuidi	24	EU	Saint-Étienne	Signed	Summer	2014	€8M	
23	DM	(Mali)	Mohamed Sissoko	26	EU	Juventus (Italy)	Signed	Summer	2014	€7M	
30	GK	(Italy)	Salvatore Sirigu	24	EU	Palermo (Italy)	Signed	Summer	2015	€3.9M	
27	AM	(Argentina)	Javier Pastore	22	EU	Palermo (Italy)	Signed	Summer	2016	€42M	
15	CB	(Uruguay)	Diego Lugano	30	EU	Fenerbahçe (Turkey)	Signed	Summer	2014	€3M	
17	LB	(Brazil)	Maxwell	30	Non-EU	Barcelona (Spain)	Signed	Winter	2015	€3.5M	
40	GK	(France)	Ronan Le Crom	37	EU	Free agent	Signed	Winter	2012	Free	
13	CB	(Brazil)	Alex	29	Non-EU	Chelsea (England)	Signed	Winter	2014	€5M	
28	CM	(Italy)	Thiago Motta	29	EU	Internazionale (Italy)	Signed	Winter	2015	€11.5M	

Total spending: ▼€106.1 million.

Out

No.	Pos.	Nat.	Name	Age	EU	Moving to	Type	Transfer window	Transfer fee	Source
4	DM	(France)	Claude Makélélé	38	EU	Retired	Contract Ended	Summer	Retired	
1	GK	(France)	Grégory Coupet	38	EU	Retired	Contract Ended	Summer	Retired	
30	GK	(Armenia)	Apoula Edel	25	EU	Hapoel Tel Aviv (Israel)	Contract Ended	Summer	Free	
13	CB	(Mali)	Sammy Traoré	35	EU	Retired	Contract Ended	Summer	Retired	
31	AM	(Mali)	Adama Touré	20	Non-EU	Lorient	Contract Ended	Summer	Free	
7	RW	(France)	Ludovic Giuly	35	EU	Monaco	Contract Ended	Summer	Free	
27	RM	(France)	Younousse Sankharé	21	EU	Dijon	Transferred	Summer	€0.5M	
24	LM	(France)	Tripy Makonda	21	EU	Brest	Transferred	Summer	€0.5M	
23	DM	(France)	Jérémy Clément	27	EU	Saint-Étienne	Transferred	Summer	€1.8M	
21	FW	(Haiti)	Jean-Eudes Maurice	25	EU	Lens	Loaned	Summer	30.06.2012	
17	DM	(France)	Granddi Ngoyi	23	EU	Nantes	Loaned	Summer	30.06.2012	
28	CB	(France)	Loïck Landre	19	EU	Clermont	Loaned	Winter	30.06.2012	
11	FW	(Turkey)	Mevlüt Erdinç	24	EU	Rennes	Transferred	Winter	€7.5M	
19	FW	(Brazil)	Éverton Santos	25	Non-EU	Seongnam Ilhwa Chunma (South Korea)	Released	Winter	Free	

Total income: ▲€10.3 million.

Expenditure: ▼€95.8 million.

== Squad information ==
N	Pos.	Nat.	Name	Age	EU	Since	App	Goals	Ends	Transfer fee	Notes
1	GK	(France)	Nicolas Douchez	46	EU	2011	0	0	2014	Free	
2	RB	(Brazil)	Ceará	46	Non-EU	2007	161	1	2013	€2.5m	
3	CB	(France)	Mamadou Sakho (captain)	36	EU	2006	141	5	2014	Youth system	
4	CB	(Serbia)	Milan Biševac	43	Non-EU	2011	0	0	2014	€4M	
5	LM	(Ivory Coast)	Siaka Tiéné	44	EU	2010	42	0	2013	€1M	
6	CB	(France)	Zoumana Camara	47	EU	2007	164	5	2013	€6M	
7	AM	(France)	Jérémy Ménez	39	EU	2011	0	0	2014	€9M	
8	ST	(France)	Péguy Luyindula	47	EU	2006	179	37	2012	€2.5M	
9	ST	(France)	Guillaume Hoarau	42	EU	2008	126	48	2013	€0.5M	
10	LW	(Brazil)	Nenê	45	EU	2010	51	20	2013	€5.5M	
12	CM	(France)	Mathieu Bodmer	43	EU	2010	42	10	2013	€2.5M	
13	CB	(Brazil)	Alex	44	Non-EU	2012	0	0	2014	€5M	
14	DM	(France)	Blaise Matuidi	39	EU	2011	0	0	2014	€7.5M	
15	CB	(Uruguay)	Diego Lugano	45	EU	2011	0	0	2014	€3M	
16	GK	(France) (Philippines)	Alphonse Areola	33	EU	2010	0	0	2016	Free	
17	LB	(Brazil)	Maxwell	45	Non-EU	2012	0	0	2015	€4M	
18	ST	(France)	Loris Arnaud	39	EU	2007	30	4	2012	Youth system	
19	ST	(France)	Kevin Gameiro	39	EU	2011	0	0	2015	€11M	
20	CM	(France)	Clément Chantôme	39	EU	2006	177	8	2015	Youth system	
21	CF	(Haiti) (France)	Jean-Eudes Maurice	40	EU	2008	50	3	2014	Free	
22	LB	(France)	Sylvain Armand	46	EU	2004	324	11	2013	€3.5M	
23	DM	(Mali)	Mohamed Sissoko	41	EU	2011	0	0	2014	€8M	
25	CF	(France)	Jean-Christophe Bahebeck	33	EU	2011	13	1	2014	Youth system	
26	RB	(France)	Christophe Jallet	42	EU	2009	95	6	2015	€2.5M	
27	AM	(Argentina)	Javier Pastore	37	EU	2011	0	0	2016	€43M	
28	DM	(France)	Loïck Landre	34	EU	2011	1	0	2014	Youth system	
29	AM	(France)	Neeskens Kebano	34	EU	2011	7	1	2014	Youth system	
30	GK	(Italy)	Salvatore Sirigu	39	EU	2011	0	0	2015	€3.5M	
40	GK	(France)	Ronan Le Crom	52	EU	2012	0	0	2012	Free	
—	RM	(France)	Granddi Ngoyi	38	EU	2007	33	0	2013	Youth system	
—	CF	(Brazil)	Éverton Santos	39	Non-EU	2008	3	0	2012	€2M	
—	ST	(Turkey)	Mevlüt Erdinç	39	EU	2009	91	28	2014	€9M	

== Board and staff ==
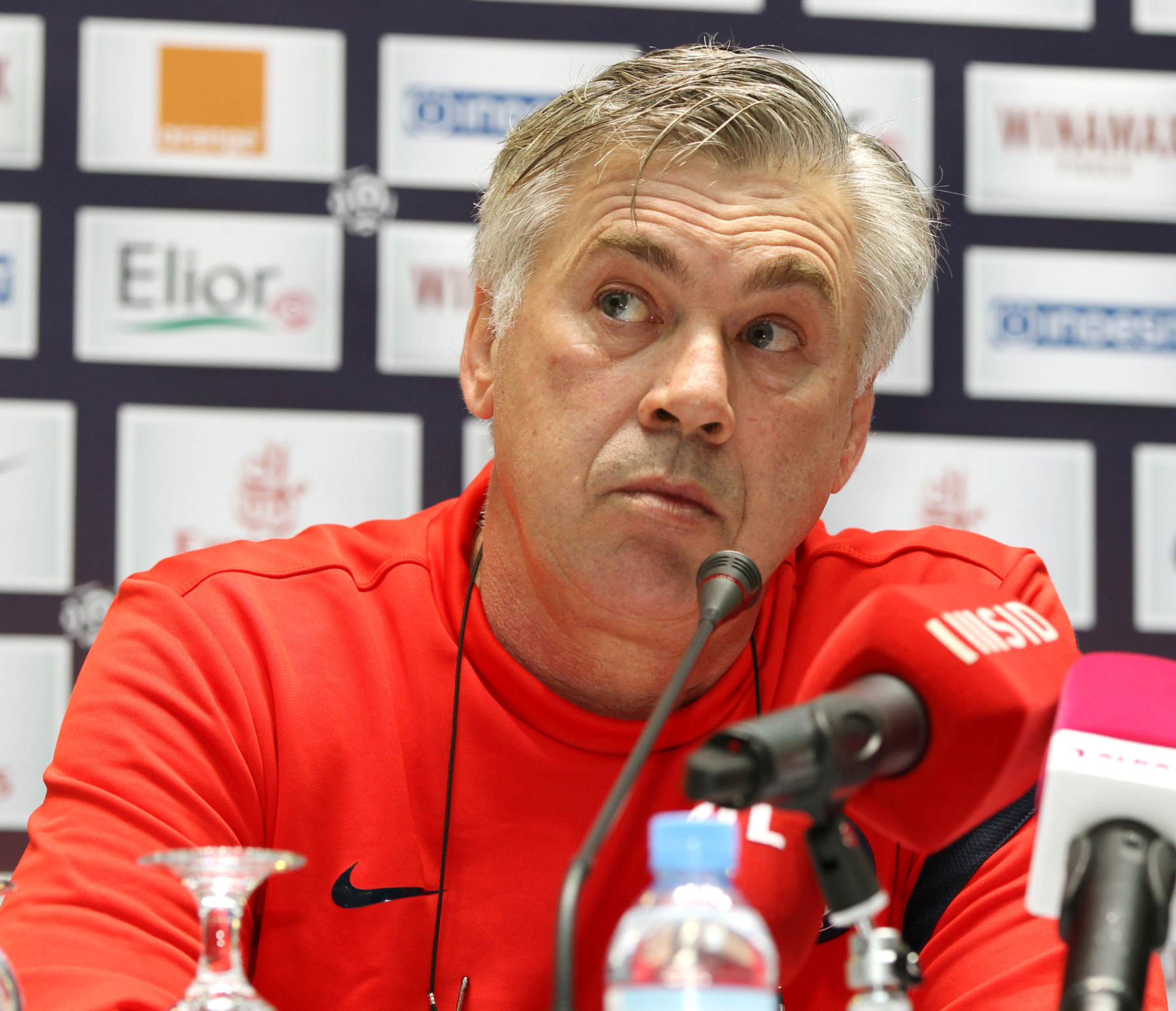
Carlo Ancelotti

Head coach	Antoine Kombouaré (until 30 December 2011); Carlo Ancelotti
Assistant coach	Yves Bertucci (until 18 January 2012); Claude Makélélé, Paul Clement, Angelo Castellazzi
Chief performance officer	Nick Broad
Goalkeeping coach	Gilles Bourges
Physical trainers	Giovanni Mauri, Raphaël Févre, Simon Colinet, Denis Lefebve
Head doctor	Éric Rolland
Physiotherapists	Bruno Le Natur, Jérôme Andral, Gaël Pasquier

Source: PSG.fr

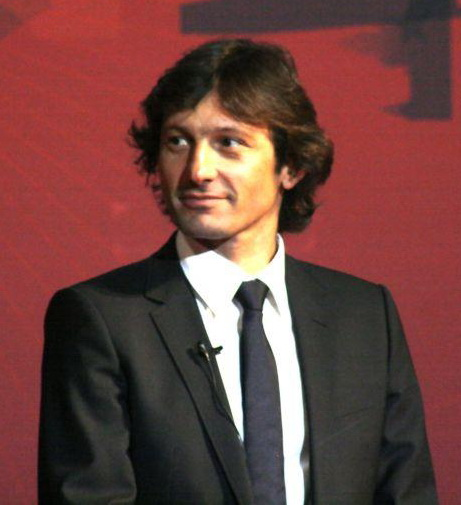
Leonardo

President	Robin Leproux (until 13 July 2011); Benoît Rousseau (until 7 October 2011); Nasser Al-Khelaifi
Delegate director general	Jean-Claude Blanc
General manager	Phillipe Boindrieux
Director of football	Leonardo
Marketing	Michel Mimran
Communications	Bruno Skropeta
Recruitment	Alain Roche
Ground (capacity and dimensions)	Parc des Princes (48,712 / 252m x 191m)

Source: Ligue 1

== Friendly matches ==
Paris Saint-Germain went down to defeat in their clash with Swiss side Sion. Antoine Kombouaré's men were three goals down early in the second-half, although they did recover some pride after Siaka Tiéné and Clément Chantôme both scored late on. PSG went down to Benfica in the opening match of the Guadiana International Tournament. Under the watchful eye of new sporting director Leonardo, Paris fell behind to an early Óscar Cardozo goal, but equalized soon after when Clément Chantôme's cushioned through ball was brilliantly lobbed home by Nenê. However, in this rematch of last season's Europa League tie, which Benfica won on aggregate, Franco Jara and Javier Saviola both netted after the restart to give the Lisbon club the win once again. A day after, their second match of the Guadiana International Tournament ended in a draw against Anderlecht. Kevin Gameiro netted his first goal for PSG, only for Lukáš Mareček to equalize for the Belgians. PSG recorded their first pre-season win, beating English second tier club Brighton & Hove Albion with Nenê making the difference, his goal laid on a plate by new signing Kevin Gameiro. Opposed to Wacker Innsbruck and Roma in two halves of 45 minutes, Paris clinched the Innsbruck Cup. PSG narrowly defeated the locals and recorded a comfortable triumph over the Italians. Paris lost to the New York Red Bulls in the Emirates Cup. Salvatore Sirigu lined up in the PSG goal for the first time and he was beaten by a low shot from Joel Lindpere. PSG bounced back with a resounding victory over Boca Juniors. Jean-Eudes Maurice, Guillaume Hoarau and Ceará sealed the victory for the nouveau riche at the Emirates Stadium. Alexandre Pato's fourth-minute goal meant Carlo Ancelotti's reign at PSG started with a loss as Milan beat the capital club in the Dubai Challenge Cup at the Al-Rashid Stadium.

=== Matches ===
9 July 2011 Friendly	Sion	3–2	Paris Saint-Germain	Le Mouret, Switzerland
17:00	Obradović 2'; Afonso 24'; Prijović 54'		Tiéné 84'; Chantôme 89'	Stadium: Centre sportif du Mouret; Attendance: 2,500; Referee: Ludovic Gremaud (Switzerland)

15 July 2011 Torneio do Guadiana	Benfica	3–1	Paris Saint-Germain	Faro, Portugal
20:45	Cardozo 11'; Jara 63'; Saviola 89'		Nenê 15'	Stadium: Estádio Algarve; Attendance: 4,000; Referee: João Ferreira (Portugal)

16 July 2011 Torneio do Guadiana	Anderlecht	1–1	Paris Saint-Germain	Faro, Portugal
21:45	Mareček 70'		Gameiro 29'	Stadium: Estádio Algarve; Attendance: 1,500; Referee: Olegário Benquerença (Portugal)

20 July 2011 Friendly	Brighton & Hove Albion	0–1	Paris Saint-Germain	Albufeira, Portugal
19:30			Nenê 28'	Stadium: Estádio Municipal de Albufeira; Attendance: 500

26 July 2011 Innsbruck Cup	FC Wacker Innsbruck	0–1	Paris Saint-Germain	Innsbruck, Austria
20:00			Gameiro 3'	Stadium: Tivoli Neu; Attendance: 3,000; Referee: Gregor Danler (Austria)
Note: Triangular tournament between Paris Saint-Germain, AS Roma and FC Wacker Innsbruck. Matches only last 45 minutes.

26 July 2011 Innsbruck Cup	Roma	0–3	Paris Saint-Germain	Innsbruck, Austria
21:00			Hoarau 2', 32'; Gameiro 30'	Stadium: Tivoli Neu; Attendance: 3,000; Referee: Gregor Danler (Austria)
Note: Triangular tournament between Paris Saint-Germain, AS Roma and FC Wacker Innsbruck. Matches only last 45 minutes.

30 July 2011 Emirates Cup	New York Red Bulls	1–0	Paris Saint-Germain	London, England
16:20	Lindpere 27'			Stadium: Emirates Stadium; Attendance: 54,488; Referee: Kristinn Jakobsson (Iceland)

31 July 2011 Emirates Cup	Paris Saint-Germain	3–0	Boca Juniors	London, England
16:20	Maurice 8'; Hoarau 38'; Ceará 79'			Stadium: Emirates Stadium; Attendance: 60,011; Referee: Ng Chiu Kok (Hong Kong)

4 January 2012 Dubai Challenge Cup	Milan	1–0	Paris Saint-Germain	Dubai, United Arab Emirates
19:30	Pato 4'			Stadium: Rashid Stadium; Attendance: 18,000; Referee: Hassan Abdullah al-Ajmi (Oman)

== Competitions ==
=== Ligue 1 ===
Paris Saint-Germain lost their first game of the season at home to Lorient, going down to a goal from Julien Quercia. Kevin Gameiro's strike had PSG on the brink of their first win of the season at Rennes, but Jonathan Pitroipa salvaged a deserved draw for the hosts. Nenê scored the winning goal from the penalty spot in Paris Saint-Germain's home win over Valenciennes. Javier Pastore supplied two assists as PSG battled back from a goal down to win at Toulouse. A moment of magic from Ligue 1 record signing Javier Pastore ended Brest's unbeaten start to the season at the Parc des Princes. Javier Pastore's stunning goal helped Paris Saint-Germain battle back from two goals down at Evian to earn a point. Kevin Gameiro converted the decisive penalty of three as PSG beat Nice at the Parc des Princes. Paris Saint-Germain were ominously impressive against Montpellier, Javier Pastore scoring twice and Kevin Gameiro once to win at the Stade de la Mosson. A sublime strike from Javier Pastore – and a late volley from Christophe Jallet – won PSG a thrilling victory over closest rivals Lyon, taking the capital club three points clear atop the table. A Kevin Gameiro hat-trick ensured Paris Saint-Germain picked up a win at Ajaccio. Two goals from Brazilian winger Nenê were enough for PSG to clinch a win over a valiant Dijon side. Nenê was the inspiration as league leaders Paris Saint-Germain came from behind to beat Caen and record their sixth straight league win. Mohamed Sissoko gave PSG the lead at Bordeaux, but Yoan Gouffran's goal meant it finished tied. Nancy threw the French title race wide open after stunning leaders Paris Saint-Germain in the capital.

Marseille took the clasico honours to condemn Paris Saint-Germain to a second straight league defeat, leaving Montpellier three points clear at the top. Paris Saint-Germain returned to winning ways beating Auxerre after a thrilling second half at the Parc des Princes. Kevin Gameiro's first goal in seven league matches proved enough for Paris Saint-Germain to beat Sochaux. Paris Saint-Germain and Lille cancelled each other out at the Parc des Princes in a goalless draw. Mathieu Bodmer headed the only goal of the game as Paris Saint-Germain won at Saint-Étienne to move clear at the top of the table once again. Nenê scored twice and Javier Pastore netted his first league goal since October as leaders PSG beat Toulouse at the Parc des Princes to give Carlo Ancelotti the perfect start to his Ligue 1 coaching career. Milan Biševac scored the only goal of the game as Paris Saint-Germain beat Brest. Paris Saint-Germain maintained their winning run under Carlo Ancelotti after strikes from Nenê and Kevin Gameiro brought the Parisians back from a goal down to beat Evian at the Parc des Princes. Carlo Ancelotti's perfect start as coach of Paris Saint-Germain ended after the capital club were held to a goalless draw by an impressive Nice. A late Guillaume Hoarau strike ensured it finished tied between leaders PSG and second-placed Montpellier. Guillaume Hoarau salvaged a draw for Paris Saint-Germain at Lyon in Ligue 1's match of the season with a 94th-minute equalizer as the capital club slipped from top spot. Argentine superstar Javier Pastore marked a return to form with a goal and an assist as Paris Saint-Germain beat Ajaccio to return to the top of the table.

Kevin Gameiro scored a dramatic injury-time winner as ten-man Paris Saint-Germain beat Dijon. Paris Saint-Germain scored through Christophe Jallet after the regulation 90 minutes for the fourth game running to salvage a draw at Caen. Paris Saint-Germain missed the opportunity to go back to the top of the Ligue 1 table when they were held at home by Bordeaux. Paris Saint-Germain suffered a first Ligue 1 defeat in 15 outings as Nancy won over the title pretenders. Paris Saint-Germain centre-half Alex scored the winner as PSG beat Marseille at the Parc des Princes. Anthony Le Tallec scored a late equaliser to secure a draw for Auxerre against Paris Saint-Germain. Inspired by a dazzling performance from Nenê, PSG got back to winning ways in emphatic fashion with a win over relegation-threatened Sochaux. Eden Hazard was once again outstanding as Lille came from behind to beat ten-man Paris Saint-Germain. Paris Saint-Germain moved to within three points of leaders Montpellier as Nenê and Javier Pastore gave the capital club a win over Saint-Étienne. PSG came back from two goals down to beat Valenciennes in a thriller in the north of France. A brilliant hat-trick from Nenê and a magnificent performance from Jérémy Ménez handed Paris Saint-Germain a win against Rennes that keeps them in the title running with a game to spare. PSG came from behind to beat Lorient at the Stade du Moustoir but the win was not enough for them to win the Ligue 1 title.

==== League table ====
Pos	Team	Pld	W	D	L	GF	GA	GD	Pts	Qualification or relegation
1	Montpellier (C)	38	25	7	6	68	34	+34	82	Qualification to Champions League group stage
2	Paris Saint-Germain	38	23	10	5	75	41	+34	79	Qualification to Champions League group stage
3	Lille	38	21	11	6	72	39	+33	74	Qualification to Champions League play-off round
4	Lyon	38	19	7	12	64	51	+13	64	Qualification to Europa League group stage (Note: Lyon won the 2011–12 Coupe de France and thus qualified for the group stage of the 2012–13 UEFA Europa League. Since they finished 4th, the spot for the Europa League play-off round goes to the fifth-placed team.)
5	Bordeaux	38	16	13	9	53	41	+12	61	Qualification to Europa League play-off round

Source: Ligue 1
Rules for classification: 1) points; 2) goal difference; 3) number of goals scored.
(C) Champions

==== Results summary ====
Overall								Home						Away					
Pld	W	D	L	GF	GA	GD	Pts	W	D	L	GF	GA	GD	W	D	L	GF	GA	GD
38	23	10	5	75	41	+34	79	14	3	2	42	16	+26	9	7	3	33	25	+8

Source: Ligue 1

==== Results by round ====
Round	1	2	3	4	5	6	7	8	9	10	11	12	13	14	15	16	17	18	19	20	21	22	23	24	25	26	27	28	29	30	31	32	33	34	35	36	37	38
Ground	H	A	H	A	H	A	H	A	H	A	H	H	A	H	A	H	A	H	A	H	A	H	A	H	A	H	A	A	H	A	H	A	H	A	H	A	H	A
Result	L	D	W	W	W	D	W	W	W	W	W	W	D	L	L	W	W	D	W	W	W	W	D	D	D	W	W	D	D	L	W	D	W	L	W	W	W	W
Position	15	13	9	3	4	5	4	1	1	1	1	1	1	1	2	2	2	2	1	1	1	1	1	1	2	1	1	1	2	2	2	2	2	2	2	2	2	2

Source: Ligue 1
A = Away; H = Home; W = Win; D = Draw; L = Loss

==== Matches ====
6 August 2011 1	Paris Saint-Germain	0–1	Lorient	Paris
21:00			Quercia 28'	Stadium: Parc des Princes; Attendance: 40,048; Referee: Wilfried Bien

13 August 2011 2	Rennes	1–1	Paris Saint-Germain	Rennes
19:00	Pitroipa 88'		Gameiro 73'	Stadium: Stade de la Route de Lorient; Attendance: 27,927; Referee: Pascal Viléo

21 August 2011 3	Paris Saint-Germain	2–1	Valenciennes	Paris
17:00	Gameiro 39'; Nenê 64' (pen.)		Gomis 45+1'	Stadium: Parc des Princes; Attendance: 35,875; Referee: Olivier Thual

28 August 2011 4	Toulouse	1–3	Paris Saint-Germain	Toulouse
17:00	Capoue 39'		Gameiro 56'; Erdinç 90'; Menez 90+3'	Stadium: Stadium de Toulouse; Attendance: 31,122; Referee: Lionel Jaffredo

11 September 2011 5	Paris Saint-Germain	1–0	Brest	Paris
21:00	Pastore 68'			Stadium: Parc des Princes; Attendance: 40,134; Referee: Saïd Ennjimi

18 September 2011 6	Evian	2–2	Paris Saint-Germain	Annecy
17:00	Leroy 14'; Sagbo 20' (pen.)		Pastore 43'; Bodmer 80'	Stadium: Parc des Sports; Attendance: 15,162; Referee: Sébastien Moreira

21 September 2011 7	Paris Saint-Germain	2–1	Nice	Paris
19:00	Nenê 36' (pen.); Gameiro 71' (pen.)		Monzón 61' (pen.)	Stadium: Parc des Princes; Attendance: 39,065; Referee: Antony Gautier

24 September 2011 8	Montpellier	0–3	Paris Saint-Germain	Montpellier
21:00			Gameiro 39'; Pastore 43', 80'	Stadium: Stade de la Mosson; Attendance: 24,842; Referee: Laurent Duhamel

2 October 2011 9	Paris Saint-Germain	2–0	Lyon	Paris
21:00	Pastore 64'; Jallet 90'			Stadium: Parc des Princes; Attendance: 44,450; Referee: Stéphane Lannoy

16 October 2011 10	Ajaccio	1–3	Paris Saint-Germain	Ajaccio
17:00	Medjani 24'		Gameiro 2', 50', 53'	Stadium: Stade François Coty; Attendance: 8,155; Referee: Lionel Jaffredo

23 October 2011 11	Paris Saint-Germain	2–0	Dijon	Paris
17:00	Nenê 42', 90'			Stadium: Parc des Princes; Attendance: 44,071; Referee: Nicolas Rainville

29 October 2011 12	Paris Saint-Germain	4–2	Caen	Paris
19:00	Nenê 20' (pen.), 76' (pen.); Menez 55'; Pastore 88'		Heurtaux 12'; Vandam 82'	Stadium: Parc des Princes; Attendance: 43,812; Referee: Clément Turpin

6 November 2011 13	Bordeaux	1–1	Paris Saint-Germain	Bordeaux
21:00	Gouffran 12'		Sissoko 10'	Stadium: Stade Chaban-Delmas; Attendance: 29,496; Referee: Stéphane Lannoy

20 November 2011 14	Paris Saint-Germain	0–1	Nancy	Paris
21:00			Calvé 49'	Stadium: Parc des Princes; Attendance: 40,199; Referee: Antony Gautier

27 November 2011 15	Marseille	3–0	Paris Saint-Germain	Marseille
21:00	Rémy 9'; Amalfitano 65'; Ayew 84'			Stadium: Stade Vélodrome; Attendance: 41,512; Referee: Lionel Jaffredo

4 December 2011 16	Paris Saint-Germain	3–2	Auxerre	Paris
17:00	Jallet 52'; Menez 76'; Nenê 80'		Oliech 59'; Dudka 87'	Stadium: Parc des Princes; Attendance: 42,035; Referee: Wilfried Bien

10 December 2011 17	Sochaux	0–1	Paris Saint-Germain	Montbéliard
19:00			Gameiro 20'	Stadium: Stade Auguste-Bonal; Attendance: 16,098; Referee: Philippe Malige

18 December 2011 18	Paris Saint-Germain	0–0	Lille	Paris
21:00				Stadium: Parc des Princes; Attendance: 45,195; Referee: Clément Turpin

21 December 2011 19	Saint-Étienne	0–1	Paris Saint-Germain	Saint-Étienne
21:00			Ruffier 31' (o.g.)	Stadium: Stade Geoffroy-Guichard; Attendance: 25,136; Referee: Saïd Ennjimi

14 January 2012 20	Paris Saint-Germain	3–1	Toulouse	Paris
21:00	Nenê 38', 68'; Pastore 56'		Braaten 88'	Stadium: Parc des Princes; Attendance: 44,669; Referee: Alexandre Castro

28 January 2012 21	Brest	0–1	Paris Saint-Germain	Brest
19:00			Biševac 6'	Stadium: Stade Francis-Le Blé; Attendance: 14,760; Referee: Philippe Kalt

4 February 2012 22	Paris Saint-Germain	3–1	Evian	Paris
19:00	Nenê 47', 78'; Gameiro 89'		Cambon 45+1'	Stadium: Parc des Princes; Attendance: 41,624; Referee: Saïd Ennjimi

12 February 2012 23	Nice	0–0	Paris Saint-Germain	Nice
17:00				Stadium: Stade Municipal du Ray; Attendance: 12,332; Referee: Bartolomeu Varela

19 February 2012 24	Paris Saint-Germain	2–2	Montpellier	Paris
21:00	Alex 41'; Hoarau 88'		Belhanda 45+2'; Utaka 82'	Stadium: Parc des Princes; Attendance: 44,398; Referee: Tony Chapron

25 February 2012 25	Lyon	4–4	Paris Saint-Germain	Lyon
21:00	Gomis 34'; López 36'; Bastos 40'; Briand 58'		Hoarau 21', 90+4'; Nenê 45+2' (pen.); Ceará 73'	Stadium: Stade de Gerland; Attendance: 37,347; Referee: Fredy Fautrel

4 March 2012 26	Paris Saint-Germain	4–1	Ajaccio	Paris
17:00	Pastore 27'; Menez 29'; Hoarau 86'; Nenê 90+2'		Poulard 42'	Stadium: Parc des Princes; Attendance: 44,510; Referee: Nicolas Rainville

11 March 2012 27	Dijon	1–2	Paris Saint-Germain	Dijon
17:00	Paulle 76'		Tiéné 49'; Gameiro 90+1'	Stadium: Stade Gaston Gérard; Attendance: 14,446; Referee: Philippe Malige

17 March 2012 28	Caen	2–2	Paris Saint-Germain	Caen
19:00	Frau 54'; Heurtaux 71'		Pastore 56'; Jallet 90+1'	Stadium: Stade Michel d'Ornano; Attendance: 19,172; Referee: Alexandre Castro

25 March 2012 29	Paris Saint-Germain	1–1	Bordeaux	Paris
21:00	Hoarau 81'		Diabaté 77'	Stadium: Parc des Princes; Attendance: 44,723; Referee: Lionel Jaffredo

31 March 2012 30	Nancy	2–1	Paris Saint-Germain	Nancy
21:00	Traoré 18'; Mollo 89'		Sissoko 50'	Stadium: Stade Marcel Picot; Attendance: 18,802; Referee: Laurent Duhamel

8 April 2012 31	Paris Saint-Germain	2–1	Marseille	Paris
19:00	Menez 6'; Alex 61'		A. Ayew 59'	Stadium: Parc des Princes; Attendance: 46,252; Referee: Antony Gautier

15 April 2012 32	Auxerre	1–1	Paris Saint-Germain	Auxerre
21:00	Le Tallec 86'		Nenê 23'	Stadium: Stade de l'Abbé-Deschamps; Attendance: 12,010; Referee: Jean-Charles Cailleux

22 April 2012 33	Paris Saint-Germain	6–1	Sochaux	Paris
17:00	Pastore 6'; Motta 25'; Menez 43'; Nenê 55', 59'; Armand 90+2'		Maïga 12'	Stadium: Parc des Princes; Attendance: 44,366; Referee: Wilfried Bien

29 April 2012 34	Lille	2–1	Paris Saint-Germain	Lille
21:00	Hazard 71' (pen.); Roux 79'		Pastore 48'	Stadium: Stadium Lille Métropole; Attendance: 17,262; Referee: Pascal Viléo

2 May 2012 35	Paris Saint-Germain	2–0	Saint-Étienne	Paris
21:00	Nenê 21' (pen.); Pastore 88'			Stadium: Parc des Princes; Attendance: 43,961; Referee: Saïd Ennjimi

6 May 2012 36	Valenciennes	3–4	Paris Saint-Germain	Valenciennes
21:15	Aboubakar 8'; Gomis 11'; Cohade 80'		Nenê 15'; Maxwell 40'; Matuidi 45'; Menez 58'	Stadium: Stade Nungesser; Attendance: 16,914; Referee: Fredy Fautrel

13 May 2012 37	Paris Saint-Germain	3–0	Rennes	Paris
21:00	Nenê 47', 58', 65' (pen.)			Stadium: Parc des Princes; Attendance: 45,537; Referee: Tony Chapron

20 May 2012 38	Lorient	1–2	Paris Saint-Germain	Lorient
21:00	Monnet-Paquet 28'		Pastore 61'; Motta 75'	Stadium: Stade du Moustoir; Attendance: 16,529; Referee: Laurent Duhamel

=== Coupe de France ===
The draw for the Coupe de France's last 64 was held as France's élite joined the competition. Last season's runners-up Paris Saint-Germain fared well, being pitted against fifth-division Locminé. PSG needed a stoppage time strike from Diego Lugano to see off the amateurs from Locminé in what was new coach Carlo Ancelotti's first competitive game in charge. In the draw for the last 32, Paris Saint-Germain were paired against Sablé, another fifth-division team. Nenê and Kevin Gameiro both scored twice as PSG eased into the last 16 of the French Cup with a big win over fifth tier Sablé. But playmaker Javier Pastore went off injured in the first half. Paris Saint-Germain went to Dijon in what was a repeat of the sides' meeting in the Coupe de la Ligue last 16 in October. On that occasion, Dijon came from 2–0 down to win 3-2. PSG had a nervous time as they held off a spirited Dijon side to narrowly win – thanks to a Nenê goal – and reach the quarter-finals. The draw for the last eight of the French Cup produced the stand-out fixture between eight-times winners Paris Saint-Germain and Olympique Lyonnais. Lyon inflicted a first defeat of the Ancelotti era on PSG and reached the last four of the French Cup, where they joined Gazélec Ajaccio, who stunned Montpellier, and Rennes, winners over Valenciennes.

==== Matches ====
8 January 2012 Round of 64	Locminé	1–2	Paris Saint-Germain	Lorient
17:30	Maiga 73' (pen.)		Pastore 53'; Bodmer (yellow card) 56'; Lugano 90+3'	Stadium: Stade du Moustoir; Attendance: 15,744; Referee: Pascal Vilé

20 January 2012 Round of 32	Sablé-sur-Sarthe	0–4	Paris Saint-Germain	Le Mans
20:30			Nenê 36' (pen.), 90+1'; Gameiro 65', 73'	Stadium: MMArena; Attendance: 23,900; Referee: Antony Gautier

15 February 2012 Round of 16	Dijon	0–1	Paris Saint-Germain	Dijon
19:00	Marcq (yellow card) 53'		Nenê 15'; Ceará (yellow card) 67'; Motta (yellow card) 75'	Stadium: Stade Gaston Gérard; Attendance: 9,484; Referee: Wilfried Bien

21 March 2012 Quarter-finals	Paris Saint-Germain	1–3	Lyon	Paris
20:50	Nenê 19' (pen.); Motta (yellow card) 74'; Pastore (yellow card) 88'; Jallet (yellow card) 90+1'		Källström 25'; López 39'; Lovren (yellow card) 54'; Grenier (yellow card) 84'; Gomis 90+2'	Stadium: Parc des Princes; Attendance: 42,175; Referee: Clément Turpin

=== Coupe de la Ligue ===
The draw for the Coupe de la Ligue's round of 16 pitted Dijon playing host to Paris Saint-Germain days after their Week 11 league clash at the Parc des Princes as Ligue 1's six sides competing in Europe entered into the competition. Dijon, inspired by Brice Jovial, came from two goals down to dump league leaders PSG out of the League Cup thanks to a brilliant win.

==== Matches ====
26 October 2011 Round of 16	Dijon	3–2	Paris Saint-Germain	Dijon
17:00	Sankharé 30' (pen.); Berenguer 32', (yellow card) 90+3'; Jovial 61' (pen.); Mandanne (yellow card) 79'		Bahebeck 16'; Erding 20'; Lugano (yellow card) 51'; Ménez (yellow card) 55'; Bodmer (yellow card) 65'	Stadium: Stade Gaston Gérard; Attendance: 10,115; Referee: Alexandre Castro

=== UEFA Europa League ===
Big-spending Paris Saint-Germain had to face Greek outfit Olympiacos Volos in the UEFA Europa League play-offs over two legs for a place in the group stages. Olympiacos Volos, however, were excluded from the Europa League for their involvement in a match-fixing scandal, with UEFA handing the Greek club a three-season ban from continental competition. Differdange from Luxembourg replaced Olympiacos Volos. The UEFA Appeals Body seconded the decision of the Control and Disciplinary Body to exclude Olympiacos Volos from the Europa League competition. Javier Pastore provided two assists in his debut to help Paris Saint-Germain take a commanding lead into the second leg of their UEFA Europa League play-off tie against Differdange. Paris Saint-Germain never looked in danger of squandering their first-leg lead as they claimed a convincing win over Differdange to take the tie 6–0 on aggregate and advance to the group stages. However, it did take Antoine Kombouaré's star-studded side more than an hour to break down the Luxembourgish outfit, but Nenê's spectacular strike from distance was worth the wait. Paris Saint-Germain were top seeds for the draw in Monaco and were placed in a testing Group F alongside Athletic Bilbao, Slovan Bratislava and Red Bull Salzburg.

Paris Saint-Germain produced a classy attacking display to beat Red Bull Salzburg. Nenê, Mathieu Bodmer and Jérémy Ménez all scored to hand their side the perfect Europa League start. PSG fell to a defeat - their first in 11 matches - away to Athletic Bilbao as Mohamed Sissoko saw red in his first start for the club. After being reduced to nine men Paris Saint-Germain hung on to secure a potentially vital point thanks to a scoreless draw against Slovan Bratislava. Javier Pastore's lone strike was enough to secure Paris Saint-Germain a narrow win over a tenacious Slovan Bratislava side at the Parc des Princes and reassert the capital club's claim on a qualifying spot for the knockout rounds of the Europa League. Paris Saint-Germain were outplayed by Red Bull Salzburg and had to win against Athletic Bilbao - and hope that Salzburg didn't beat Slovan Bratislava - if they were to book a place in the Europa League's last 16. Paris Saint-Germain produced a late surge to beat Athletic Bilbao, but their Europa League qualification hopes were dashed after rivals Red Bull Salzburg beat Slovan Bratislava in Slovakia.

==== Play-off round ====
18 August 2011 First leg	Differdange 03 (Luxembourg)	0–4	(France) Paris Saint-Germain	Luxembourg City, Luxembourg
20:45		Report	Gameiro 17'; Bahebeck 71'; Ceará 90'; Ménez 90+1'	Stadium: Stade Josy Barthel; Attendance: 6,153; Referee: Matej Jug (Slovenia)

25 August 2011 Second leg	Paris Saint-Germain (France)	2–0 (6–0 agg.)	(Luxembourg) Differdange 03	Paris, France
21:00	Nenê 65'; Afoun 79' (o.g.)	Report		Stadium: Parc des Princes; Attendance: 15,194; Referee: Kristinn Jakobsson (Iceland)

==== Group stage ====
Pos	Team	Pld	W	D	L	GF	GA	GD	Pts	Qualification	AB	RBS	PSG	SB
1	(Spain) Athletic Bilbao	6	4	1	1	11	8	+3	13	Advance to knockout phase	—	2–2	2–0	2–1
2	(Austria) Red Bull Salzburg	6	3	1	2	11	8	+3	10 (Note: Tied on head-to-head points (3) and head-to-head goal difference (0). Head-to-head away goals: Red Bull Salzburg 1, Paris Saint-Germain 0.)	Advance to knockout phase	0–1	—	2–0	3–0
3	(France) Paris Saint-Germain	6	3	1	2	8	7	+1	10		4–2	3–1	—	1–0
4	(Slovakia) Slovan Bratislava	6	0	1	5	4	11	−7	1		1–2	2–3	0–0	—

Source: Soccerway
Notes:

15 September 2011 1	Paris Saint-Germain (France)	3–1	(Austria) Red Bull Salzburg	Paris, France
19:00	Nenê 35' (pen.); Bodmer 44'; Ménez 67'	Report	Sekagya 87'	Stadium: Parc des Princes; Attendance: 23,039; Referee: Luca Banti (Italy)

29 September 2011 2	Athletic Bilbao (Spain)	2–0	(France) Paris Saint-Germain	Bilbao, Spain
21:05	Gabilondo 20'; Susaeta 45'	Report		Stadium: San Mamés Stadium; Attendance: 23,487; Referee: Bas Nijhuis (Netherlands)

20 October 2011 3	Slovan Bratislava (Slovakia)	0–0	(France) Paris Saint-Germain	Bratislava, Slovakia
21:05		Report		Stadium: Štadión Pasienky; Attendance: 7,238; Referee: Lee Probert (England)

3 November 2011 4	Paris Saint-Germain (France)	1–0	(Slovakia) Slovan Bratislava	Paris, France
19:00	Pastore 63'	Report		Stadium: Parc des Princes; Attendance: 32,046; Referee: Mark Courtney (Northern Ireland)

1 December 2011 5	Red Bull Salzburg (Austria)	2–0	(France) Paris Saint-Germain	Wals-Siezenheim, Austria
21:05	Jantscher 20'; Švento 90+4'	Report		Stadium: Red Bull Arena; Attendance: 8,304; Referee: Liran Liany (Israel)

14 December 2011 6	Paris Saint-Germain (France)	4–2	(Spain) Athletic Bilbao	Paris, France
19:00	Pastore 21'; Bodmer 41'; Pérez 85' (o.g.); Hoarau 90' (pen.)	Report	Aurtenetxe 3'; López 55'	Stadium: Parc des Princes; Attendance: 37,114; Referee: Matej Jug (Slovenia)

== Appearances and goals ==
Only Paris Saint-Germain players with at least one appearance in a competitive match with the first team during the season.

No.	Nat.	Position	Player	Total			Ligue 1			Coupe de France			Coupe de la Ligue			UEFA Europa League
No.	Nat.	Position	Player	Apps	Goals	Assists	Apps	Goals	Assists	Apps	Goals	Assists	Apps	Goals	Assists	Apps	Goals	Assists
1	(France)	GK	Nicolas Douchez	10	0	0	0	0	0	2	0	0	1	0	0	7	0	0
30	(Italy)	GK	Salvatore Sirigu	41	0	0	38	0	0	2	0	0	0	0	0	1	0	0
2	(Brazil)	DF	Ceará	36	2	0	24	1	0	3	0	0	1	0	0	8	1	0
3	(France)	DF	Mamadou Sakho	26	0	0	22	0	0	2	0	0	1	0	0	1	0	0
4	(Serbia)	DF	Milan Biševac	25	1	1	19	1	1	3	0	0	0	0	0	3	0	0
6	(France)	DF	Zoumana Camara	28	0	0	19	0	0	2	0	0	1	0	0	6	0	0
13	(Brazil)	DF	Alex	16	2	0	15	2	0	1	0	0	0	0	0	0	0	0
15	(Uruguay)	DF	Diego Lugano	21	1	0	12	0	0	3	1	0	1	0	0	5	0	0
17	(Brazil)	DF	Maxwell	15	1	0	14	1	0	1	0	0	0	0	0	0	0	0
22	(France)	DF	Sylvain Armand	31	1	2	22	1	2	3	0	0	1	0	0	5	0	0
26	(France)	DF	Christophe Jallet	44	3	5	33	3	5	4	0	0	1	0	0	6	0	0
5	(Ivory Coast)	MF	Siaka Tiéné	29	1	2	23	1	2	0	0	0	0	0	0	6	0	0
7	(France)	MF	Jérémy Ménez	42	9	16	33	7	13	3	0	1	1	0	1	5	2	1
10	(Brazil)	MF	Nenê	47	27	14	35	21	10	4	4	2	1	0	0	7	2	2
12	(France)	MF	Mathieu Bodmer	42	3	2	31	1	2	3	0	0	1	0	0	7	2	0
14	(France)	MF	Blaise Matuidi	35	1	1	29	1	1	2	0	0	0	0	0	4	0	0
17	(France)	MF	Granddi Ngoyi	2	0	0	0	0	0	0	0	0	0	0	0	2	0	0
20	(France)	MF	Clément Chantôme	21	0	2	15	0	2	2	0	0	0	0	0	4	0	0
23	(Mali)	MF	Mohamed Sissoko	30	2	1	25	2	1	2	0	0	0	0	0	3	0	0
27	(Argentina)	MF	Javier Pastore	43	16	8	33	13	6	3	1	0	0	0	0	7	2	2
28	(Italy)	MF	Thiago Motta	16	2	0	14	2	0	2	0	0	0	0	0	0	0	0
29	(France)	MF	Neeskens Kebano	2	0	0	0	0	0	0	0	0	0	0	0	2	0	0
9	(France)	FW	Guillaume Hoarau	26	6	3	20	5	2	4	0	1	0	0	0	2	1	0
11	(Turkey)	FW	Mevlüt Erdinç	19	2	3	11	1	2	1	0	0	1	1	0	6	0	1
19	(France)	FW	Kevin Gameiro	45	14	2	34	11	2	3	2	0	1	0	0	7	1	0
21	(Haiti)	FW	Jean-Eudes Maurice	3	0	0	1	0	0	0	0	0	0	0	0	2	0	0
25	(France)	FW	Jean-Christophe Bahebeck	15	2	1	8	0	0	0	0	0	1	1	0	6	1	1
