= Blaise Matuidi =

French footballer (born 1987)

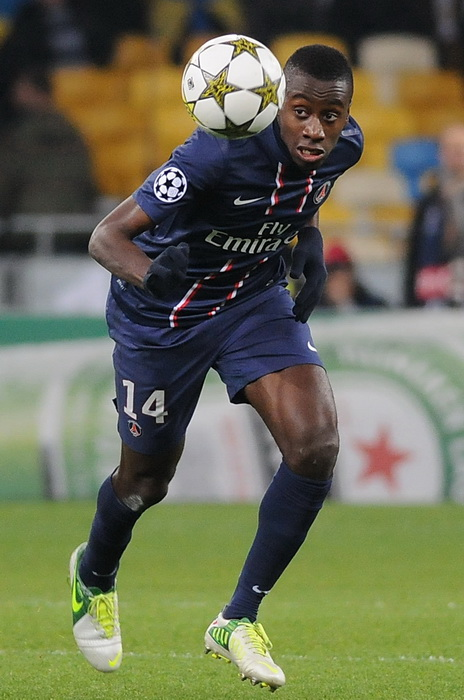
- Matuidi in 2012

Personal information
- Full name: Blaise Matuidi
- Date of birth: 9 April 1987 (age 39)
- Place of birth: Toulouse, Haute-Garonne, France
- Height: 1.80 m (5 ft 11 in)
- Position: Midfielder

Youth career
- 1993–1998: US Fontenay-sous-Bois
- 1998–2001: CO Vincennes
- 2001–2002: Créteil
- 2000–2003: INF Clairefontaine
- 2003–2004: Troyes

Senior career*
| Years | Team | Apps | (Gls) |
| 2004–2007 | Troyes | 67 | (4) |
| 2007–2011 | Saint-Étienne | 132 | (3) |
| 2011–2017 | Paris Saint-Germain | 203 | (23) |
| 2017–2020 | Juventus | 98 | (6) |
| 2020–2021 | Inter Miami | 47 | (2) |
| Total | | 547 | (38) |

International career
| 2006–2007 | France U19 | 9 | (0) |
| 2007–2010 | France U21 | 25 | (0) |
| 2010–2019 | France | 84 | (9) |
Medal record
Men's football
Representing France
FIFA World Cup
| Winner | 2018 Russia |
UEFA European Championship
| Runner-up | 2016 France |
- * Club domestic league appearances and goals

Blaise Matuidi (French: [blɛz matɥidi]; born 9 April 1987) is a French former professional footballer who played as a midfielder. He most notably played for Paris Saint-Germain, Juventus, and the France national team, with which he won the 2018 FIFA World Cup.

Matuidi began his football career playing for amateur clubs in the Île-de-France region, such as US Fontenay-sous-Bois and CO Vincennois. In 2000, he was selected to attend the prestigious Clairefontaine academy. In 2004, he signed with professional club Troyes and made his professional debut in the 2004–05 season. After three seasons with Troyes, Matuidi joined Saint-Étienne. With Saint-Étienne, he played European football for the first time after participating in the 2008–09 edition of the UEFA Cup. In the 2009–10 season, he was named first-choice captain under manager Alain Perrin.

In July 2011, after four seasons with Saint-Étienne, Matuidi transferred to Paris Saint-Germain, which had been newly acquired by Qatar Sports Investments, on a three-year deal. He won sixteen domestic honours during his time with the club, including four consecutive Ligue 1 titles. In 2017, he joined Italian side Juventus, winning a domestic double in his first season, followed by two more consecutive league titles over the next two seasons, as well as the 2018 Supercoppa Italiana. He played for Major League Soccer club Inter Miami for two seasons before retiring in 2022.

Matuidi is a former France youth international, having represented his nation at under-19 and under-21 level. In August 2010, Matuidi was called up to the senior team for the first time under new manager Laurent Blanc. He made his international debut in September 2010 and has since represented his nation at two UEFA European Football Championships and two FIFA World Cups, winning a runners-up medal at Euro 2016, and a winner's medal at the 2018 FIFA World Cup.

== Early life ==
Blaise Matuidi was born on 9 April 1987 in Toulouse, Haute-Garonne, to an Angolan father, Faria Rivelino, and a Congolese mother, Élise. Rivelino emigrated to France at a young age. Matuidi has four other siblings and was raised in the Parisian suburb of Fontenay-sous-Bois, Val-de-Marne. He grew an attraction to the sport of football watching Paris Saint-Germain and became an admirer of former PSG attacker Jay-Jay Okocha.

== Club career ==
=== Early career ===
Matuidi began his football career at the age of six playing for hometown club US Fontenay-sous-Bois. After five years at the club, he joined CO Vincennes in nearby Vincennes, where he was teammates with Yacine Brahimi for a year. In 1999, Matuidi was rated as one of the best players in the Île-de-France region and was subsequently selected to attend the prestigious INF Clairefontaine academy. He trained at the academy for three seasons, playing there on weekdays while simultaneously playing for Vincennes on the weekends. In 2001, Matuidi left Vincennes to sign for semi-professional club Créteil. He spent one year in the club youth academy quickly becoming one of the club's most sought after prospects. Despite an intriguing offer from the two-time defending champions Lyon, Matuidi signed with Troyes, citing the club's training centre as his primary reason.

=== Troyes ===
Matuidi began his career with Troyes playing on the club's reserve team in the Championnat de France amateur 2, the fifth division of French football. In November 2004, he was called up to the senior team by manager Jean-Marc Furlan and made his professional debut on 23 November in the team's Ligue 2 match against Gueugnon. Matuidi started the match and played over 60 minutes in a 2–1 victory. His only other appearance with the senior team in the 2004–05 season came on 4 February 2005 in a league match against Guingamp. Matuidi was relegated back to the club's reserve team for the rest of the campaign where he helped the team finish in sixth place. In the following season, Matuidi was promoted to the senior team, who were now playing in Ligue 1, on a permanent basis. He was inserted as a starter by Furlan and appeared in 31 league matches. Matuidi was also one of the league leaders in card accumulation, with 11. He scored his first professional goal on 11 January 2006 in a 1–0 victory against Lille, converting a volley that was described by the media as "magnificent." Despite the impressive individual season from Matuidi, Troyes finished only one spot above the relegation zone.

Following the season, on 16 June 2006, Matuidi signed his first professional contract, agreeing to a four-year deal with Troyes despite interest from English club Charlton Athletic. Despite the firing of Furlan, Matuidi remained first-choice under new manager Denis Troch. He appeared in 35 total matches and score three goals. He also reduced his card accumulation to only six. Arguably Matuidi's greatest performance in a Troyes shirt came on 28 April 2007 against Sedan, whom Troyes were contesting a relegation battle with. With Troyes trailing 2–1 at home with 15 minutes remaining, Matuidi scored an equalizing goal in the 75th minute. Eight minutes later, he scored the winning goal to give Troyes a 3–2 victory. Matuidi scored again on the final match day of the season against Lens in a 3–0 win, however, Troyes still dropped down to Ligue 2 after finishing the season in the 18th position. The club's relegation back to Ligue 2 caused speculation regarding Matuidi's future with the club.

=== Saint-Étienne ===
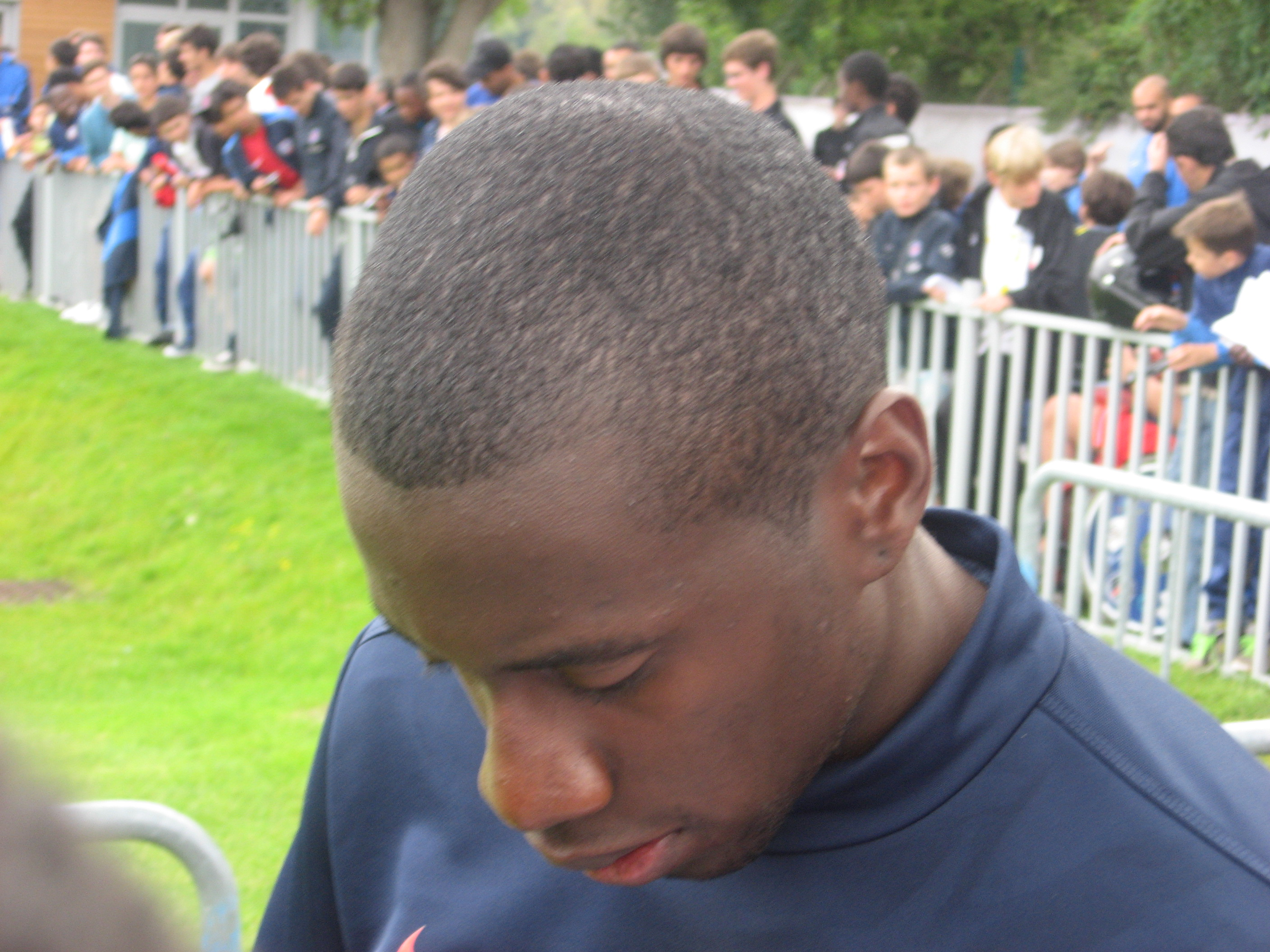
Matuidi signing autographs in 2011

Despite being linked with a hosts of Ligue 1 clubs, notably Bordeaux, Lille, and Monaco, on 12 July 2007, it was confirmed that Matuidi had agreed to join Saint-Étienne after agreeing to a four-year deal with the club. Upon his arrival, Matuidi was given the number 12 shirt and was inserted into the starting XI, where he established midfield partnerships with Loïc Perrin and Christophe Landrin. He also formed a bond with former and fellow Troyen Bafétimbi Gomis, who had a breakout season. Matuidi made his club debut on 11 August 2007 in a league match against Valenciennes. He remained first-choice for the entire season under Laurent Roussey. The club's play that season culminated into a fifth-place finish and qualification for the UEFA Cup.

During the 2008–09 season, Matuidi's performances caught the attention of English club Arsenal, who sent its scout Gilles Grimandi to watch him. Grimandi subsequently recommended the player to fellow Frenchman and Arsenal manager Arsène Wenger. Matuidi was also tracked by Italian club Milan during the season. On 16 August 2008, he scored his first career goal for Saint-Étienne in a 2–1 win over Sochaux. Matuidi made his European debut on 18 September 2008 in the team's first leg tie in the first round of the UEFA Cup against Israeli club Hapoel Tel Aviv. He made eight appearances in the competition as Saint-Étienne ultimately reached the Round of 16 before suffering elimination to German club Werder Bremen. Matuidi appeared consistently in the league until receiving his first career red card in the team's 3–0 defeat to Lille. In the second half of the season, Matuidi and the club in general struggled with injuries. The team's broken collective resulted in Saint-Étienne barely avoiding relegation, having survived on the last day of the season. After the season, Matuidi announced his intent to leave the club, telling French newspaper L'Equipe, "My wish is to leave because I think it's time." Matuidi also stated that he would be happy if he remained at Saint-Étienne. After failing to receive any significant offers from clubs in the 2009 summer, sporting director Damien Comolli announced that Matuidi would remain at the club for the 2009–10 season.

Matuidi was named as the club's captain by incoming manager Alain Perrin following the first league match of the 2009–10 season due to injuries to incumbent captain Loïc Perrin. Despite Loïc Perrin returning to the team in September 2009, Matuidi still held onto the armband. Under his leadership, Saint-Étienne defeated the defending champions Bordeaux 3–1 on 3 October 2009. Following the firing of Alain Perrin midway through the season, incoming manager Christophe Galtier returned the captaincy back to Loïc Perrin. On 18 May 2010, Matuidi was involved in a physical altercation with teammate Dimitri Payet during the team's 1–0 defeat to Toulouse. Midway through the first-half, Payet received criticism from teammate Yohan Benalouane for displaying a lack of aggression. He was then confronted by Matuidi, who echoed Benalouane's sentiments. Matuidi and Payet went face-to-face with the latter player delivering a blow to Matuidi's head before the two were separated by referee Bruno Coue and teammates. As a result of the incident, Payet was substituted out after 31 minutes and sanctioned by club president Roland Romeyer. On 6 October 2010, following both Matuidi and Payet's call up to the France national team, Matuidi described the altercation as a "lack of maturity" on both players part, while Payet described the incident as "an argument that had no place" and that "the incident was explained and the two were on new ground".

=== Paris Saint-Germain ===
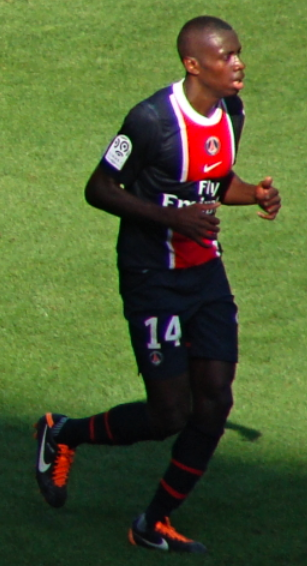
Matuidi playing for Paris Saint-Germain in 2011

On 25 July 2011, Paris Saint-Germain confirmed that the club had signed Matuidi to a three-year contract as a replacement for the departed Claude Makélélé, who retired from the sport. The transfer fee was undisclosed, but is purported to be in the region of €7.5 million plus future incentives. Matuidi was presented to the media the same day alongside fellow new signing and international teammate Jérémy Ménez and was assigned the number 14 shirt. He made his club debut for the team in its 1–0 defeat to the New York Red Bulls at the Emirates Cup. Matuidi made his competitive debut for PSG on 6 August 2011 in the team's opening 1–0 league defeat to Lorient. During the 2012–13 season, Matuidi scored in wins against Bastia(0–4), Troyes (4–0, 0–1), Lyon (1–0), and Brest as PSG won Ligue 1 for the first time in 19 years. He scored his first UEFA Champions League goal in a 4–0 defeat of Dinamo Zagreb at the Parc des Princes on 6 November 2012, and went on to score a stoppage time equalising goal in a 2–2 draw with Barcelona in the quarter-final first leg.

On 24 May 2013, Matuidi was one of five PSG players named in the Ligue 1 Team of the Year.

On 26 February 2014, Matuidi agreed a four-year contract extension. On 10 May 2014, he scored in PSG's 3–1 win at Lille as the Parisians set a new points record in Ligue 1.

On 30 September 2014, Matuidi scored the winning goal for PSG in a 3–2 home victory over Barcelona in the group stage of the 2014–15 UEFA Champions League.

On 16 May 2015, he scored in a 2–1 win at Montpellier to confirm a third consecutive French league title for Paris Saint-Germain.

In the 2015–16 season, Matuidi was named in the UNFP Ligue 1 Team of the Year for the second time. On 21 May 2016, he scored the opening goal of PSG's 2016 Coupe de France Final win over Marseille to record the second consecutive league-Coupe de France-Coupe de la Ligue domestic treble for the club.

On 28 September 2016, Matuidi scored the equalising goal for PSG in the 3–1 away victory against Ludogorets Razgrad in PSG's second 2016–17 UEFA Champions League Group A match, his first goal for PSG since the 2016 Coupe de France Final.

=== Juventus ===
On 18 August 2017, Matuidi joined Juventus on a three-year contract that would expire on 30 June 2020. The initial transfer fee was €20 million, plus up to €10.5 million in potential bonuses that would depend on the number of appearances made by him in Juventus' competitive matches over the next three seasons. He made his club and Serie A debut on 19 August 2017, in a 3–0 home win over Cagliari. Matuidi scored his first goal for Juventus on 17 December; the final goal of a 3–0 away win over Bologna.

On 1 September 2018, Matuidi scored his first goal of the 2018–19 season in a 2–1 away win over Parma in Serie A. On 30 October 2019, Matuidi made his 100th appearance for Juventus in a 2–1 home win over Genoa in Serie A.

On 12 August 2020, Matuidi terminated his contract with Juventus on a consensual basis. In three seasons at the club, Matuidi won three Serie A titles, one Coppa Italia, and one Supercoppa Italiana; he played 133 games in all competitions for Juventus, more than any other player at the club since his arrival — other than Paulo Dybala (134) – and scored eight goals, also providing five assists.

=== Inter Miami ===
On 13 August 2020, Matuidi signed for Major League Soccer club Inter Miami on a free transfer. He made his club debut on 6 September, in a scoreless home draw against Nashville in the MLS. In May 2021, Inter Miami had to pay a $2m fine for breaking MLS rules, as Matuidi was the fourth designated player in the team rather than the permitted three.

In January 2022, Matuidi was left off Inter Miami’s roster for the 2022 season.

On 23 December 2022, Matuidi announced his retirement from professional football after an 18 year long career.

== Post-playing career ==
After retiring, Matuidi remained in Miami and moved into business and youth development. In 2022, he co-founded Origins, an investment fund focused on technology, through which he later created the startup Playse.

He also co-founded One FC, a youth soccer academy in Miami, with former professional players Kieran Gibbs and Sylvain Marveaux. The club initially competed in the MLS NEXT Academy Division, and in March 2026, MLS NEXT announced that One FC Miami would move up to its top tier, the Homegrown Division, from the 2026–27 season, with teams from under-13 to under-19. One FC has also opened academies in Houston and Boston.

== International career ==
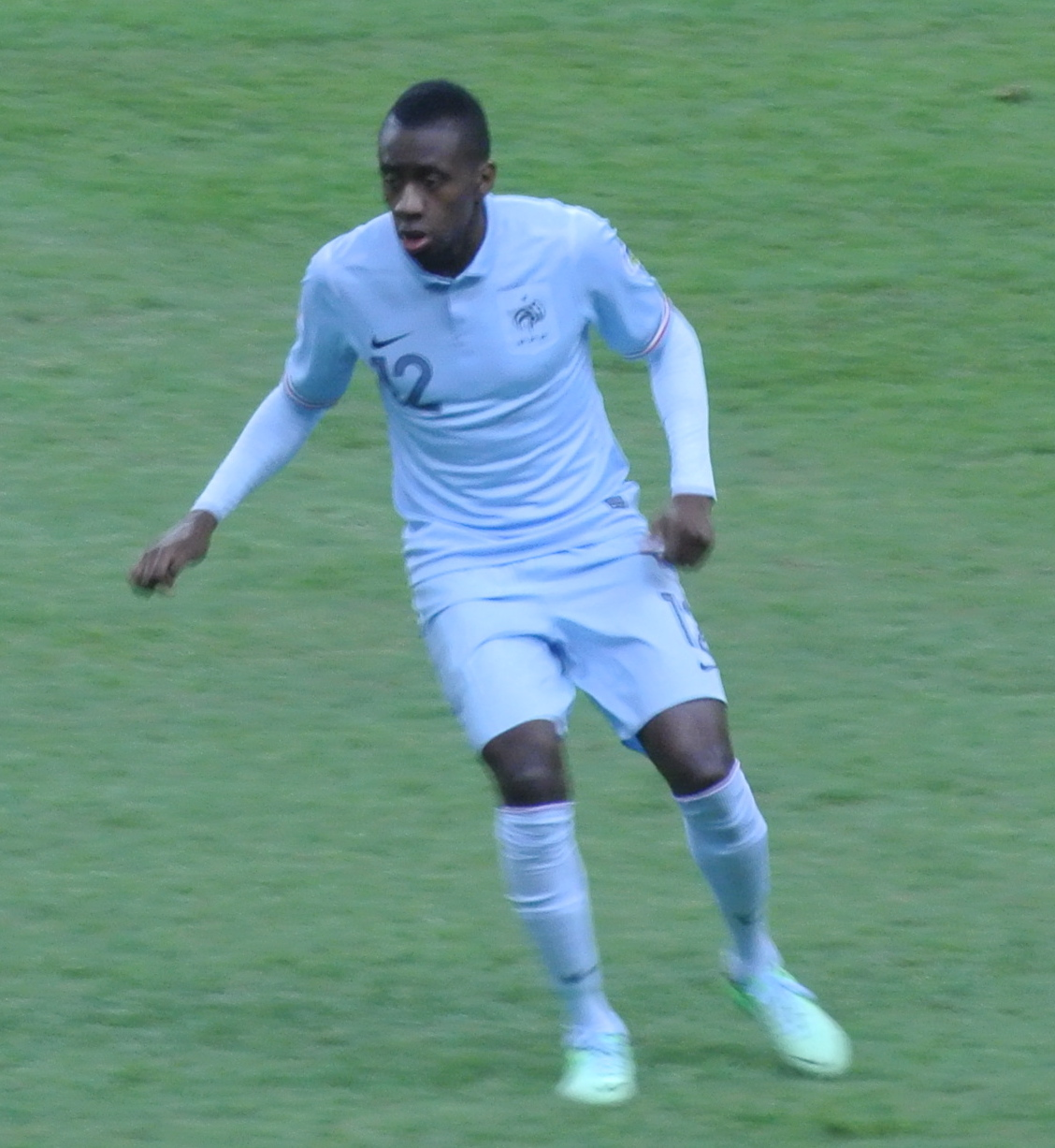
Matuidi playing for France against Georgia, 2013

Matuidi is a former French youth international, having represented his nation at under-19 and under-21 level. He went unnoticed while developing at both Créteil and Troyes; after establishing himself in the 2006–07 season with the latter club, however, he was called up to the under-19 team by coach Guy Ferrier. Matuidi made his youth international debut on 5 October 2005 in a 4–0 friendly match victory over Norway. He subsequently appeared with the team in qualifying matches for the 2006 UEFA European Under-19 Football Championship. France ultimately failed to qualify for the competition and Matuidi finished the campaign with nine appearances and no goals.

Matuidi earned his first call up to the under-21 team under coach René Girard in the team's first match following the 2006 UEFA European Under-21 Football Championship against Belgium, appearing as a half-time substitute for Jimmy Briand. He featured in qualification matches for the 2007 UEFA European Under-21 Football Championship and appeared as a substitute in both legs of the team's surprising defeat to Israel in the qualifying playoffs. Matuidi was among a handful of underage players who remained with the team after its elimination appearing with the team in its first match of 2007 against Sweden, which France won 4–0. Matuidi appeared with the team in the next ten matches, which included qualifiers for the 2009 UEFA European Under-21 Football Championship. After missing the last match of 2007, he returned to the team for their first match of 2008 against Spain. Matuidi remained with the team for the rest of the qualifying campaign. His under-21 career came to an end following the team's defeat to Germany in a two-legged play-off, which determined who would earn a berth in the 2009 UEFA European Under-21 Football Championship.

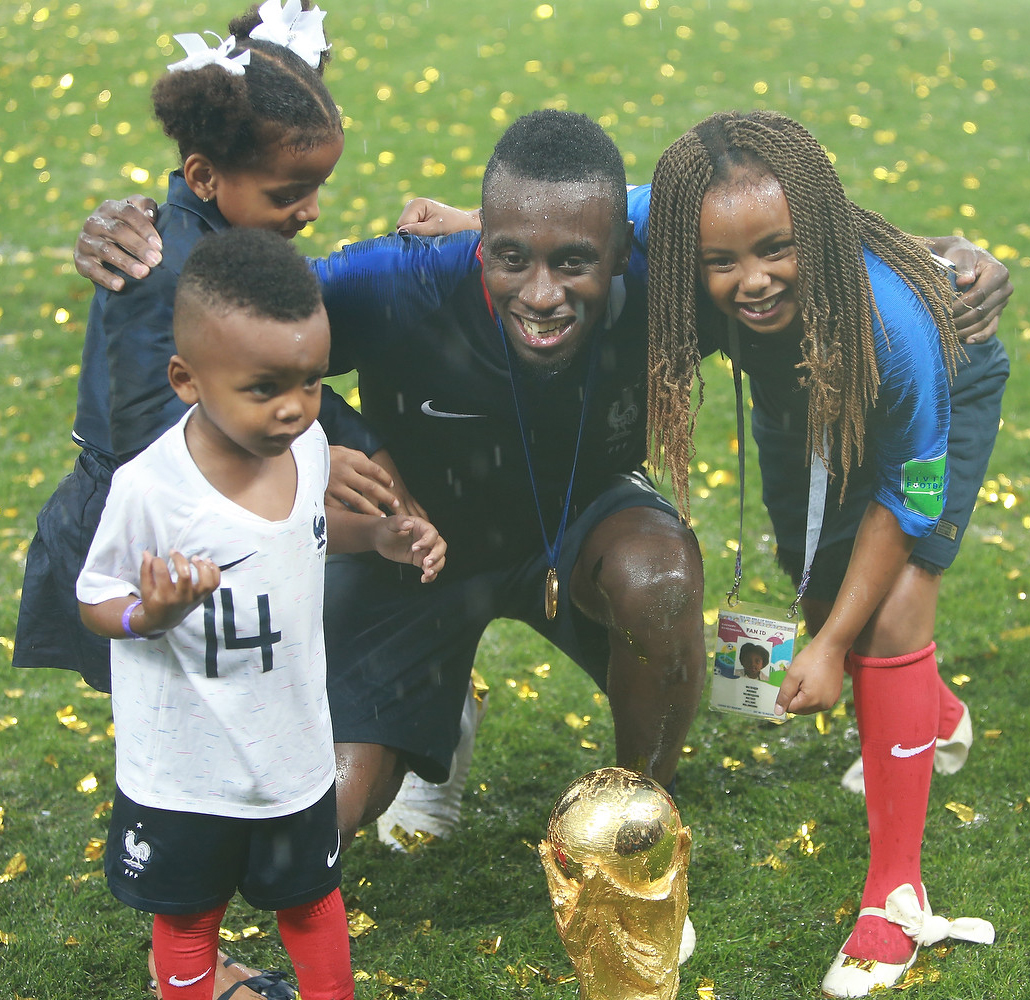
Matuidi and his children posing with the FIFA World Cup Trophy, 2018

After failing to appear at international level for nearly two years, on 5 August 2010, Matuidi was called up to the senior team for the first time by new manager Laurent Blanc for the team's friendly match against Norway on 11 August 2010. He failed to make an appearance in the match, but was called back into the team the following month as an injury replacement for UEFA Euro 2012 qualification matches against Belarus and Bosnia and Herzegovina. Matuidi made his international debut in the team's 2–0 victory over Bosnia and Herzegovina, appearing as a substitute. On 29 March 2011, he made his first start in the team's 0–0 draw with Croatia.

Matuidi was named in France's squad for Euro 2012 but did not make an appearance in the tournament due to injury. He appeared nine times during 2014 FIFA World Cup qualification and impressed in midfield in the team's 3–0 play-off defeat of Ukraine at the Stade de France to secure qualification.

Matuidi scored his first international goal with a scissor kick in a 2–0 friendly win against the Netherlands on 5 March 2014.

On 13 May 2014, Matuidi was named in Didier Deschamps' squad for the 2014 World Cup. On 8 June, he scored twice as France defeated Jamaica 8–0 in their final World Cup warm-up match.

Matuidi started alongside Paul Pogba and Yohan Cabaye in midfield in France's opening match of the tournament, a 3–0 defeat of Honduras. In the second match, Matuidi scored his first goal in a competitive international as Les Bleus beat Switzerland 5–2 and qualified for the knockout stage.

In May 2016, Matuidi was named by national side manager Deschamps to France's 23-man squad for Euro 2016, hosted on home soil. On 3 July, Matuidi assisted Olivier Giroud's opening goal in the quarter-finals of the tournament at the Stade de France, as the host nation defeated Iceland 5–2. He started in the final of the tournament on 10 July, where France suffered a 1–0 extra-time defeat to Portugal.

On 17 May 2018, he was called up to the 23-man France national squad for the 2018 FIFA World Cup in Russia. On 15 July, Matuidi started out of position on the left wing in France's 4–2 victory against Croatia in the final of the tournament.

== Style of play ==
Described as a "fierce and strong tackler", with good defensive attributes, Matuidi was known in particular for his energy, work-rate, mobility, tenacity, and physical strength, as well as his discipline, positional sense, and tactical intelligence, which enabled him to excel in a holding role as a ball-winner in midfield, due to his ability to close down spaces, intercept loose balls, or break down possession. Despite not being particularly skilful or gifted from a technical standpoint, he was a versatile and well-rounded team player, who was capable of playing in several other midfield positions, and was known for his ability to carry, distribute the ball, and start attacking plays after winning back possession, often acting as a box-to-box player in the centre of the pitch. His movement on the pitch also allowed him to contribute to his team's offensive play, as it often drew opponents out of position, and in turn created space for his teammates. He was also capable of making effective attacking runs into the box and scoring goals, which saw him deployed in a more offensive, left-sided central midfield role during his time with Juventus under manager Massimiliano Allegri, a position known as the mezzala or incursore role in Italian football jargon. Although his main influence was Claude Makélélé, his playing style was also compared to that of Jean Tigana.

During the 2018 World Cup, Matuidi was also deployed in a new position for France under manager Deschamps, playing out wide, rather than in the centre, as a left-sided winger or attacking midfielder in a 4–2–3–1 formation. In this system, he proved to be equally effective, in spite of his unorthodox playing role, as he was able to track back and limit the attacking threat of the opposing full-backs on the flank. Moreover, he also often tucked into the centre, in order to help support Paul Pogba and N'Golo Kanté defensively, which also helped minimise the amount of space given to the main playmakers of France's opponents throughout the tournament, and ultimately helped to nullify their impact on the game. Furthermore, Matuidi's more defensive role on the left flank provided balance within the team, as it in turn gave Kylian Mbappé the licence to attack and run at defences from the right wing. He was also used in a similar role by Allegri at Juventus. A left-footed player, Matuidi was also used in a more defensive role along the left flank on occasion, as a left-back, in particular under manager Maurizio Sarri during his time at Juventus. Beyond his qualities as a player, he also stood out for his consistency and mentality. In 2011, Christopher Almeras of Bleacher Report described Matuidi as one of the best ball-winners in Europe.

== Personal life ==
In April 2014, Matuidi's residence in Saint-Nom-la-Bretèche was burgled while he was playing in a match for PSG against Chelsea.

Rapper Niska paid tribute to Matuidi by creating the song "Matuidi Charo (PSG)" and dance of the Charo, dance of the vulture, which was then popularised on the football field by Matuidi.

In May 2016, he released his autobiography, "Au bout de mes rêves", written in collaboration with Ludovic Pinton (publishers Solar OCLC 953083014).

In 2018, he was named champion of the year and champion for peace by the organisation Peace and Sport, for his work with his organisation 'Tremplin Blaise Matuidi' which helps the reintegration of youths from the suburbs.

== Career statistics ==
=== Club ===
Appearances and goals by club, season and competition
| Club | Season | League | | | National cup (Note: Includes Coupe de France, Coppa Italia) | | League cup (Note: Includes Coupe de la Ligue) | | Continental | | Other | | Total | |
| Club | Season | Division | Apps | Goals | Apps | Goals | Apps | Goals | Apps | Goals | Apps | Goals | Apps | Goals |
|---|---|---|---|---|---|---|---|---|---|---|---|---|---|---|
| Troyes | 2004–05 | Ligue 2 | 2 | 0 | 1 | 0 | 0 | 0 | — | | — | | 3 | 0 |
| Troyes | 2005–06 | Ligue 1 | 31 | 1 | 0 | 0 | 0 | 0 | — | | — | | 31 | 1 |
| Troyes | 2006–07 | Ligue 1 | 34 | 3 | 0 | 0 | 1 | 0 | — | | — | | 35 | 3 |
| Troyes | Total | | 67 | 4 | 1 | 0 | 1 | 0 | — | | — | | 69 | 4 |
| Saint-Étienne | 2007–08 | Ligue 1 | 35 | 0 | 1 | 0 | 1 | 0 | — | | — | | 37 | 0 |
| Saint-Étienne | 2008–09 | Ligue 1 | 27 | 2 | 2 | 0 | 1 | 0 | 9 (Note: Appearances in UEFA Cup) | 0 | — | | 39 | 2 |
| Saint-Étienne | 2009–10 | Ligue 1 | 36 | 1 | 3 | 0 | 2 | 0 | — | | — | | 41 | 1 |
| Saint-Étienne | 2010–11 | Ligue 1 | 34 | 0 | 1 | 0 | 2 | 0 | — | | — | | 37 | 0 |
| Saint-Étienne | Total | | 132 | 3 | 7 | 0 | 6 | 0 | 9 | 0 | — | | 154 | 3 |
| Paris Saint-Germain | 2011–12 | Ligue 1 | 29 | 1 | 2 | 0 | 0 | 0 | 4 (Note: Appearances in UEFA Europa League) | 0 | — | | 35 | 1 |
| Paris Saint-Germain | 2012–13 | Ligue 1 | 37 | 5 | 4 | 1 | 2 | 0 | 9 (Note: Appearances in UEFA Champions League) | 2 | — | | 52 | 8 |
| Paris Saint-Germain | 2013–14 | Ligue 1 | 36 | 5 | 2 | 0 | 4 | 1 | 9 | 1 | 1 (Note: Appearance in Trophée des Champions) | 0 | 52 | 7 |
| Paris Saint-Germain | 2014–15 | Ligue 1 | 34 | 4 | 5 | 0 | 4 | 0 | 10 | 1 | 0 | 0 | 53 | 5 |
| Paris Saint-Germain | 2015–16 | Ligue 1 | 31 | 4 | 5 | 1 | 2 | 0 | 9 | 0 | 1 | 0 | 48 | 5 |
| Paris Saint-Germain | 2016–17 | Ligue 1 | 34 | 4 | 6 | 1 | 4 | 0 | 8 | 2 | 0 | 0 | 52 | 7 |
| Paris Saint-Germain | 2017–18 | Ligue 1 | 2 | 0 | — | | — | | — | | 1 | 0 | 3 | 0 |
| Paris Saint-Germain | Total | | 203 | 23 | 24 | 3 | 16 | 1 | 49 | 6 | 3 | 0 | 295 | 33 |
| Juventus | 2017–18 | Serie A | 32 | 3 | 5 | 0 | — | | 9 | 1 | — | | 46 | 4 |
| Juventus | 2018–19 | Serie A | 31 | 3 | 1 | 0 | — | | 9 | 0 | 1 (Note: Appearance in Supercoppa Italiana) | 0 | 42 | 3 |
| Juventus | 2019–20 | Serie A | 35 | 0 | 4 | 0 | — | | 5 | 1 | 1 | 0 | 45 | 1 |
| Juventus | Total | | 98 | 6 | 10 | 0 | — | | 23 | 2 | 2 | 0 | 133 | 8 |
| Inter Miami | 2020 | Major League Soccer | 15 | 1 | — | | — | | — | | 1 (Note: Appearance in MLS Cup playoffs) | 0 | 16 | 1 |
| Inter Miami | 2021 | Major League Soccer | 32 | 1 | — | | — | | — | | — | | 32 | 1 |
| Inter Miami | Total | | 47 | 2 | — | | — | | — | | 1 | 0 | 48 | 2 |
| Career total | | | 547 | 38 | 42 | 3 | 23 | 1 | 81 | 8 | 6 | 0 | 699 | 50 |

=== International ===
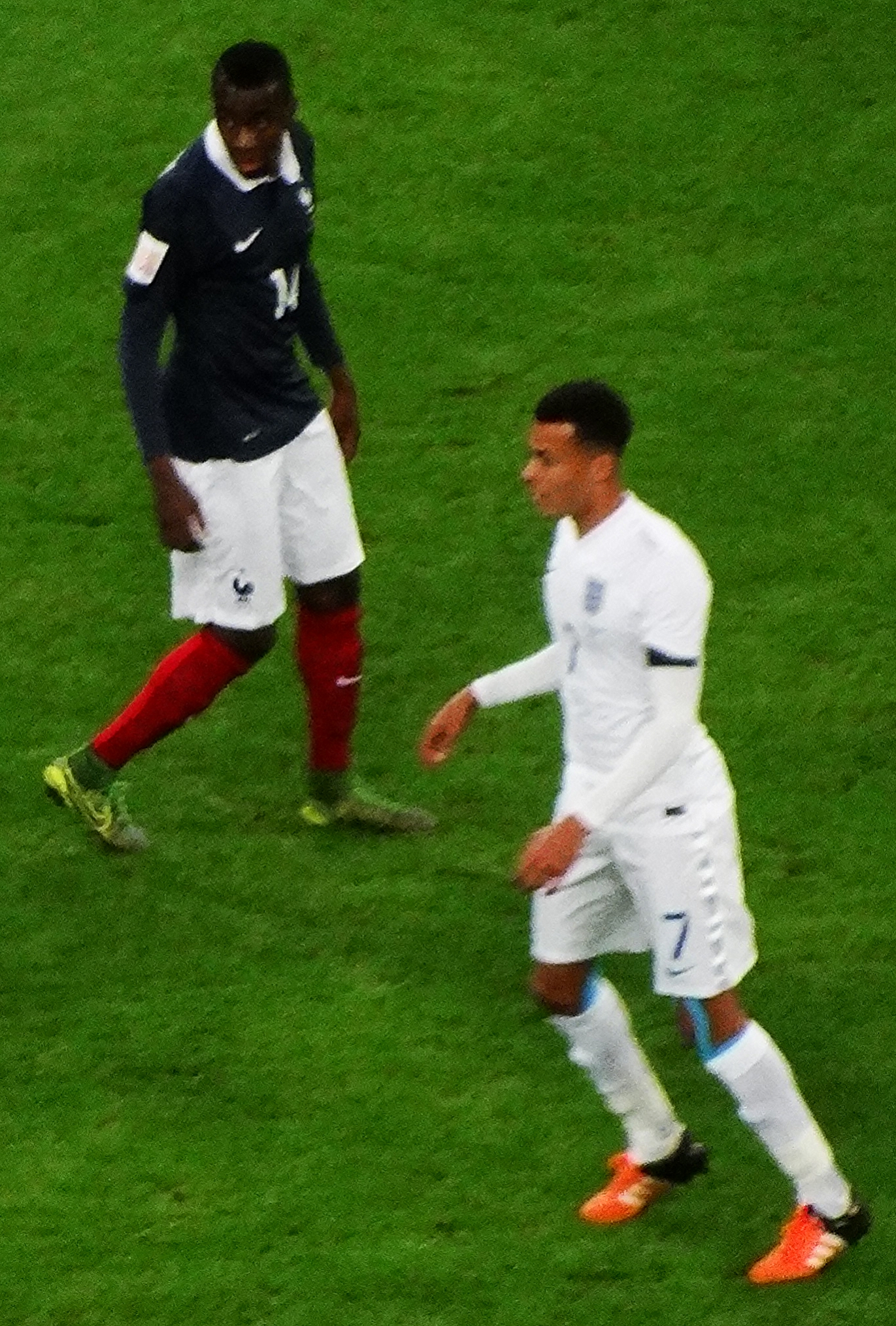
Matuidi (left) marking England's Dele Alli while on French international duty, 2015

Appearances and goals by national team and year
| National team | Year | Apps | Goals |
|---|---|---|---|
| France | 2010 | 1 | 0 |
| France | 2011 | 3 | 0 |
| France | 2012 | 5 | 0 |
| France | 2013 | 10 | 0 |
| France | 2014 | 13 | 4 |
| France | 2015 | 9 | 2 |
| France | 2016 | 14 | 2 |
| France | 2017 | 7 | 1 |
| France | 2018 | 15 | 0 |
| France | 2019 | 7 | 0 |
| Total | | 84 | 9 |

France score listed first, score column indicates score after each Matuidi goal.

International goals by date, venue, cap, opponent, score, result and competition
| No. | Date | Venue | Cap | Opponent | Score | Result | Competition |
|---|---|---|---|---|---|---|---|
| 1 | 5 March 2014 | Stade de France, Saint-Denis, France | 20 | Netherlands | 2–0 | 2–0 | Friendly |
| 2 | 8 June 2014 | Stade Pierre-Mauroy, Villeneuve-d'Ascq, France | 23 | Jamaica | 2–0 | 8–0 | Friendly |
| 3 | 8 June 2014 | Stade Pierre-Mauroy, Villeneuve-d'Ascq, France | 23 | Jamaica | 6–0 | 8–0 | Friendly |
| 4 | 20 June 2014 | Itaipava Arena Fonte Nova, Salvador, Brazil | 25 | Switzerland | 2–0 | 5–2 | 2014 FIFA World Cup |
| 5 | 7 September 2015 | Nouveau Stade de Bordeaux, Bordeaux, France | 37 | Serbia | 1–0 | 2–1 | Friendly |
| 6 | 7 September 2015 | Nouveau Stade de Bordeaux, Bordeaux, France | 37 | Serbia | 2–0 | 2–1 | Friendly |
| 7 | 25 March 2016 | Amsterdam Arena, Amsterdam-Zuidoost, Netherlands | 42 | Netherlands | 3–2 | 3–2 | Friendly |
| 8 | 30 May 2016 | Stade de la Beaujoire, Nantes, France | 43 | Cameroon | 1–0 | 3–2 | Friendly |
| 9 | 7 October 2017 | Vasil Levski National Stadium, Sofia, Bulgaria | 59 | Bulgaria | 1–0 | 1–0 | 2018 FIFA World Cup qualification |

== Honours ==
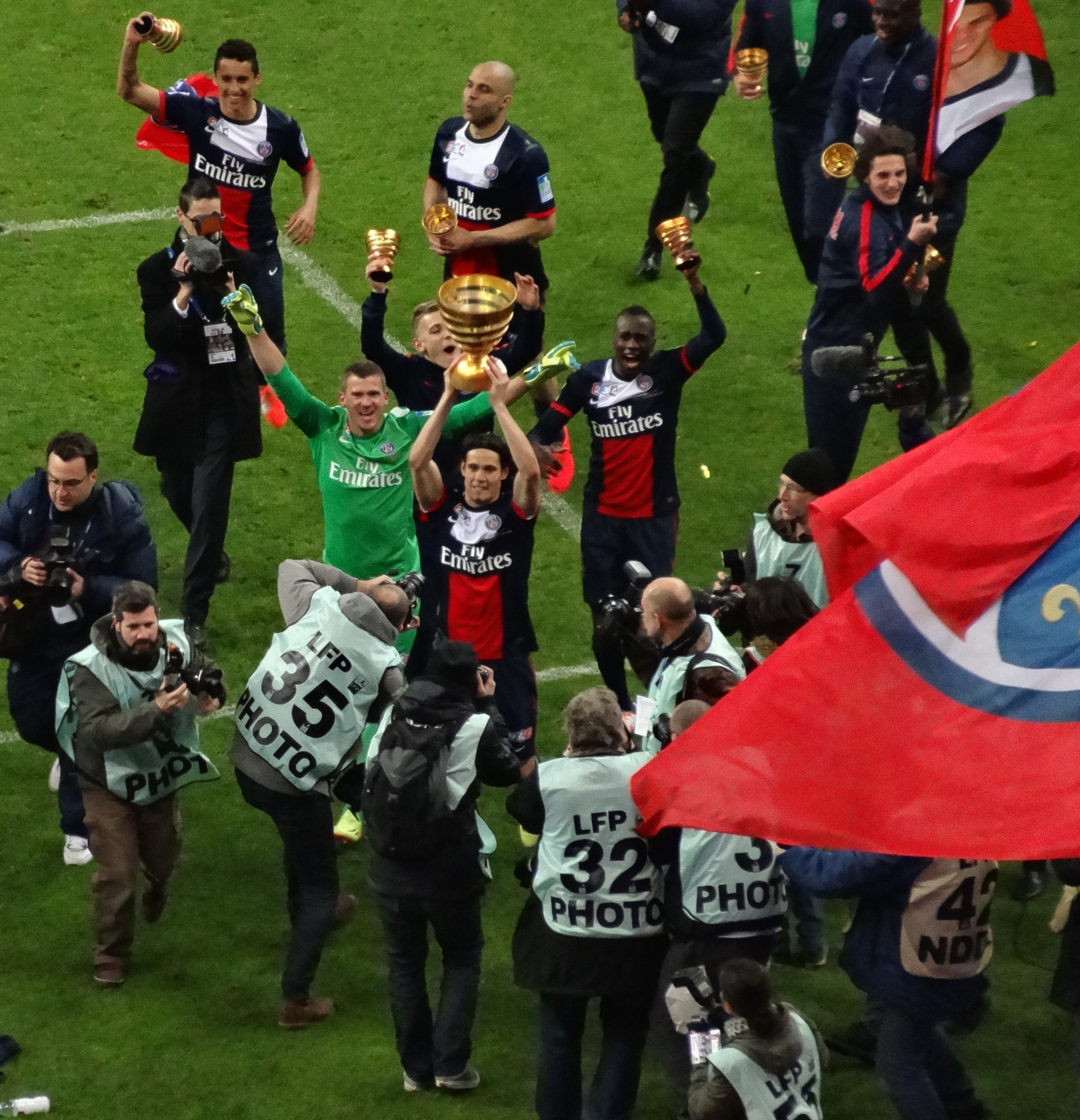
Matuidi (centre) after winning the Coupe de la Ligue 2014

Paris Saint-Germain

- Ligue 1: 2012–13, 2013–14, 2014–15, 2015–16
- Coupe de France: 2014–15, 2015–16, 2016–17
- Coupe de la Ligue: 2013–14, 2014–15, 2015–16, 2016–17
- Trophée des Champions: 2013, 2014, 2015, 2016, 2017

Juventus

- Serie A: 2017–18, 2018–19, 2019–20
- Coppa Italia: 2017–18
- Supercoppa Italiana: 2018

France

- FIFA World Cup: 2018

Individual

- Ligue 1 Team of the Year: 2012–13, 2015–16
- French Player of the Year: 2015
- Globe Soccer Awards Player Career Award: 2018

Orders

- Knight of the Legion of Honour: 2018
