= Ronan Le Crom =

French footballer (born 1974)

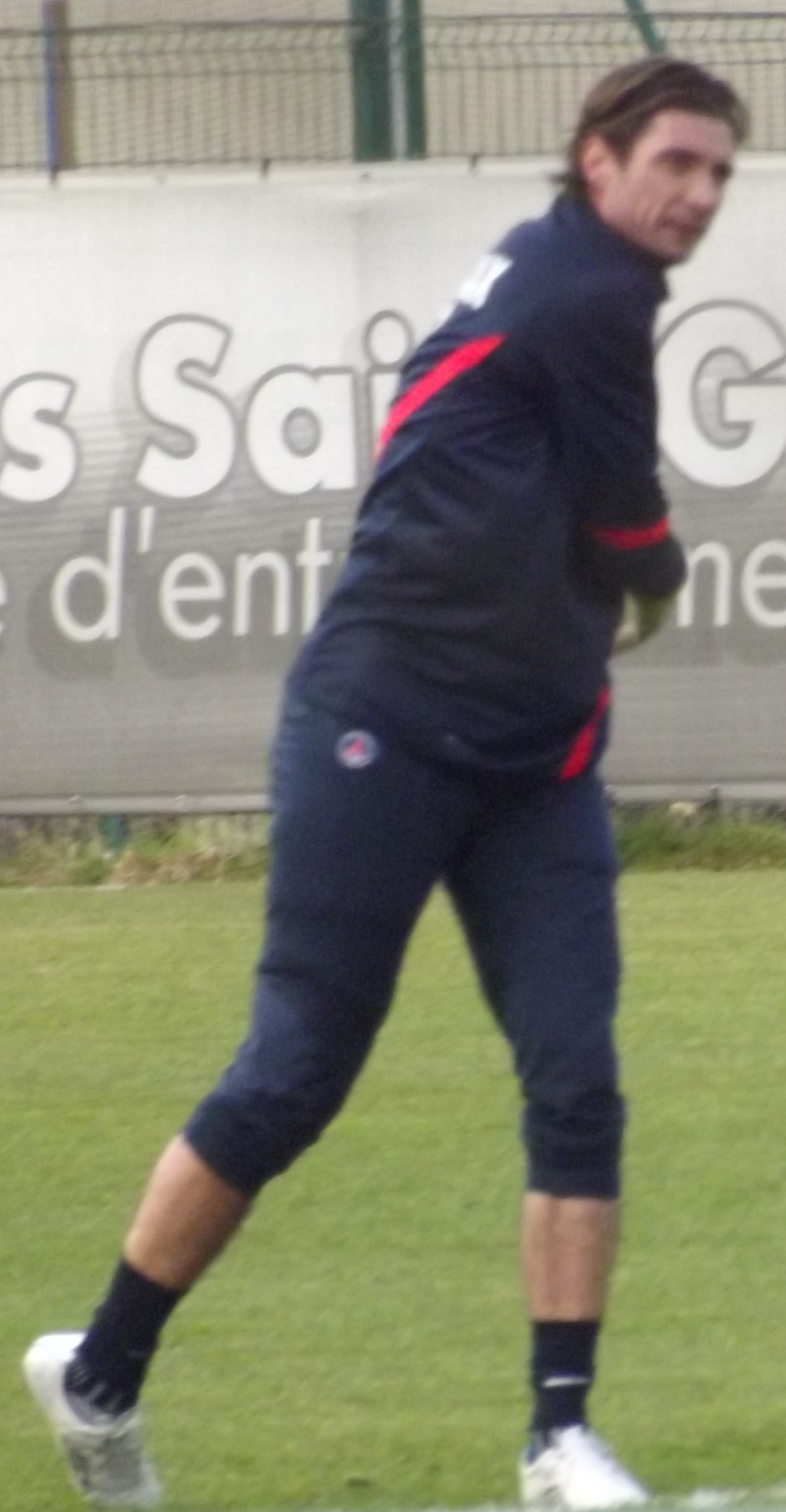
- Le Crom training with Paris Saint-Germain in 2012

Personal information
- Date of birth: 13 July 1974 (age 52)
- Place of birth: Lorient, France
- Height: 1.86 m (6 ft 1 in)
- Position: Goalkeeper

Senior career*
Years	Team	Apps	(Gls)
1995–2002	Auxerre	3	(0)
1996–1997	→ Châteauroux (loan)	17	(0)
1997–1998	→ Valence (loan)	17	(0)
2002–2004	Guingamp	76	(0)
2004–2005	→ Saint-Étienne (loan)	0	(0)
2005–2006	→ Troyes (loan)	38	(0)
2006–2007	Troyes	35	(0)
2007–2008	Lens	0	(0)
2008–2010	Grenoble	17	(0)
2010–2011	Nancy	0	(0)
2012–2013	Paris Saint-Germain	1	(0)
Total		204	(0)
- * Club domestic league appearances and goals

Ronan Le Crom (born 13 July 1974) is a French former professional football goalkeeper.

== Career ==
Le Crom began his career at AJ Auxerre, joining the senior squad in 1991. He played only three matches for the club, one in each of his final three seasons, before leaving in 2002. In his time at Auxerre, he had spent single-season loans at LB Châteauroux and ASOA Valence in Ligue 2.

Since then, he spent his career in Ligue 1, beginning with Guingamp where he played two full seasons before their relegation. The third season of his Guingamp contract was spent on loan at Saint-Étienne, although he did not play a match. Still contracted to Guingamp, Le Crom moved to Troyes on a single-season loan in 2005–06. After playing 38 league matches in the season he signed permanently in the summer of 2006.

In January 2012 Le Crom joined Paris Saint-Germain having been a free agent since leaving AS Nancy-Lorraine in July 2011. He made his debut as a substitute on 26 May 2013 in an away 3–1 win at Lorient, coming on to replace Alphonse Areola, who was also making his debut. Le Crom's debut lasted just 21 minutes as he was sent off for a foul on Lamine Gassama and he was seen crying on the touchline and needed to be consoled by team mates afterwards. Arnaud Le Lan converted the resulting penalty past makeshift goalkeeper Mamadou Sakho. This would prove to be Le Crom's last game of professional football as he retired at the end of the season.

== Career statistics ==
Appearances and goals by club, season and competition
Club	Season	League			National cup		League cup		Europe		Other		Total	
Club	Season	Division	Apps	Goals	Apps	Goals	Apps	Goals	Apps	Goals	Apps	Goals	Apps	Goals
Auxerre	1995–96	Division 1	0	0	0	0	0	0	0	0	—		0	0
Auxerre	1998–99	Division 1	0	0	0	0	0	0	0	0	—		0	0
Auxerre	1999–2000	Division 1	1	0	0	0	0	0	0	0	—		1	0
Auxerre	2000–01	Division 1	1	0	4	0	0	0	2	0	—		7	0
Auxerre	2001–02	Division 1	1	0	0	0	0	0	—		—		1	0
Auxerre	Total		3	0	4	0	0	0	2	0	—		9	0
Châteauroux (loan)	1996–97	Division 2	17	0	0	0	0	0	—		—		17	0
Valence (loan)	1997–98	Division 2	17	0	1	0	0	0	0	0	—		18	0
Guingamp	2002–03	Ligue 1	38	0	3	0	2	0	—		—		43	0
Guingamp	2003–04	Ligue 1	38	0	1	0	1	0	2	0	—		42	0
Guingamp	Total		76	0	4	0	3	0	2	0	—		85	0
Saint-Étienne (loan)	2004–05	Ligue 1	0	0	1	0	0	0	—		—		1	0
Troyes (loan)	2005–06	Ligue 1	38	0	1	0	1	0	—		—		40	0
Troyes	2006–07	Ligue 1	35	0	0	0	1	0	—		—		36	0
Troyes	Troyes total		73	0	1	0	2	0	—		—		76	0
Lens	2007–08	Ligue 1	0	0	1	0	5	0	0	0	—		6	0
Grenoble	2008–09	Ligue 1	1	0	5	0	0	0	—		—		6	0
Grenoble	2009–10	Ligue 1	16	0	2	0	1	0	—		—		19	0
Grenoble	Total		17	0	7	0	1	0	—		—		25	0
Nancy	2010–11	Ligue 1	0	0	0	0	—		—		—		0	10
Paris Saint-Germain	2012–13	Ligue 1	0	0	0	0	0	0	0	0	—		0	0
Career total			204	0	19	0	11	0	2	0	0	0	226	0

== Honours ==
Paris Saint-Germain

- Ligue 1: 2012–13
