= Juan-Luis Montero =

French footballer (born 1971)

Personal information
- Date of birth: 28 April 1971 (age 55)
- Place of birth: Bar-sur-Seine, France
- Height: 1.77 m (5 ft 10 in)
- Position: Defender

Youth career
- –1986: AJV Ource
- 1986–1989: Real Sociedad
- 1989–1990: Brest

Senior career*
Years	Team	Apps	(Gls)
1990–1997	Troyes	36	(2)
1997–1999	Lorient	64	(1)
1999–2002	Sedan	92	(0)
2002–2003	Guingamp	34	(0)
2003–2004	Clermont Foot	8	(0)
2004–2007	Troyes	82	(2)
2007–2008	Toulouse Fontaines		
2008–2010	AS Rivière-de-Corps		

Managerial career
- 2008–2010: AS Rivière-de-Corps (player-manager)
- 2010–2014: AS Rivière-de-Corps
- 2014–2015: Olympique Saint-Quentin
- 2015: Tarbes Pyrénées
- 2016–2017: RCS Chapelle
- 2017–2019: FCA Troyes
- 2019–2020: FCM Troyes
- 2020–2021: Saint-Quentin
- * Club domestic league appearances and goals

Juan-Luis Montero (born 28 April 1971 in Bar-sur-Seine) is a French former professional footballer who played as defender between 1990 and 2010. He was most recently the manager of Saint-Quentin.

He played his entire career in France for Troyes, Lorient, Sedan, Guingamp, Clermont, Toulouse Fontaines and Sainte-Savine Rivière de Corps.

== Managerial career ==
In June 2017 he became manager of FCA Troyes. He left the position in the summer 2019 and instead became head coach of FCM Troyes.

In February 2020, he was appointed manager of Saint-Quentin. He left the club at the end of the curtailed 2020–21 season.
